= 2017–18 Sunfoil 3-Day Cup =

Cricket tournament

- Dates: 12 October 2017 – 15 April 2018
- Administrator: Cricket South Africa
- Cricket format: First-class
- Tournament format: Round-robin
- Champions: (South Africa) KwaZulu-Natal
- Participants: 14
- Most runs: Janneman Malan (1046)
- Most wickets: Clayton August (41)

The 2017–18 Sunfoil 3-Day Cup was a first-class cricket competition that took place in South Africa from 12 October 2017 to 15 April 2018. The competition was played between the thirteen South African provincial teams and Namibia. Unlike its counterpart, the Sunfoil Series, the matches were three days in length instead of four. The tournament was played in parallel with the 2017–18 CSA Provincial One-Day Challenge, a List A competition which features the same teams.

Northerns and Free State were the defending champions, as the final of the previous tournament ended in a draw.

In the fixture between Border and Eastern Province in November 2017, Marco Marais of Border scored 300 not out from 191 deliveries. This was the fastest triple century in first-class cricket, the ninth triple century in first-class cricket in South Africa and the first in the country since 2010.

Following Namibia's fixture against Free State in February 2018, Namibia's captain Sarel Burger and vice-captain Craig Williams retired from cricket. They played their final match for Namibia in the corresponding one-day fixture in the 2017–18 CSA Provincial One-Day Challenge on 25 February 2018.

The final was played between KwaZulu-Natal and Namibia at the Kingsmead Cricket Ground in Durban, starting on 12 April 2018. It was the first time that Namibia had reached the final of the 3-Day Cup. KwaZulu-Natal won the tournament, beating Namibia by an innings and 25 runs.

== Points table ==
Pool A

Team	Pld	W	L	D	NR	Pts
(South Africa) KwaZulu-Natal	10	6	2	2	0	178.90
(South Africa) Western Province	10	5	2	3	0	159.22
(South Africa) Border	10	3	2	5	0	133.54
(South Africa) Northerns	10	2	3	4	1	122.50
(South Africa) North West	10	0	2	8	0	122.26
(South Africa) South Western Districts	10	0	1	9	0	117.00
(South Africa) Northern Cape	10	1	4	5	0	111.48

Team qualified for the final

Pool B

Team	Pld	W	L	D	NR	Pts
Namibia	10	5	3	2	0	153.68
(South Africa) Free State	10	3	1	6	0	151.72
(South Africa) KwaZulu-Natal Inland	10	3	3	5	0	142.80
(South Africa) Easterns	10	3	3	4	0	142.44
(South Africa) Eastern Province	10	2	3	5	0	124.30
(South Africa) Boland	10	3	5	2	0	121.40
(South Africa) Gauteng	10	1	4	4	1	94.38

Team qualified for the final

== Fixtures ==
=== October 2017 ===
12–14 October 2017
Scorecard

Eastern Province (South Africa)	v	(South Africa) Free State
371/4d (81.4 overs); Kelly Smuts 126* (122); Tshepo Motaung 1/43 (12 overs)		169 (56.2 overs); Patrick Botha 54 (46); Basheeru-Deen Walters 5/23 (16 overs)
131/3d (26 overs); Kelly Smuts 55* (67); Corné Dry 2/42 (9 overs)		115/1 (35 overs); Leus du Plooy 63* (92); Tian Koekemoer 1/31 (9 overs)

Match drawn
St George's Park, Port Elizabeth
Umpires: Murray Brown and Siphelele Gasa

- Free State won the toss and elected to field.
- Aubrey Ferreira (Eastern Province) made his first-class debut.

12–14 October 2017
Scorecard

Gauteng (South Africa)	v	(South Africa) North West
326/8d (105 overs); Tshepang Dithole 99 (235); Brady Barends 4/80 (23 overs)		410/8d (101 overs); Janneman Malan 130 (145); Izak Cornelis Bergh 2/59 (12 overs)
192/6 (70 overs); Matt McGillivray 46* (99); Johannes Diseko 5/58 (28 overs)

Match drawn
New Wanderers Stadium, Johannesburg
Umpires: Lubabalo Gcuma and Arno Jacobs

- Gauteng won the toss and elected to bat.
- Farhaan Sayanvala and Carmi le Roux (Gauteng) both made their first-class debuts.

12–14 October 2017
Scorecard

Northerns (South Africa)	v	(South Africa) Border
372/8d (92 overs); Rivaldo Moonsamy 110 (153); Mkhululi Calana 2/18 (4 overs)		362 (87.3 overs); Marco Marais 128 (153); Thomas Kaber 4/104 (24 overs)
284/4d (65 overs); Victor Mahlangu 86 (169); Tsepo Ndwandwa 2/64 (15 overs)		106/3 (29 overs); Gionne Koopman 58* (87); Eldred Hawken 2/26 (7 overs)

Match drawn
Centurion Park, Centurion
Umpires: Hassen Dawood and Stephen Harris

- Northerns won the toss and elected to bat.
- Jiveshan Pillay and Luvuyo Nkese (Northerns) both made their first-class debuts.

12–14 October 2017
Scorecard

KwaZulu-Natal (South Africa)	v	(South Africa) Easterns
367/9d (107.2 overs); Sibonelo Makhanya 94 (159); Clayton August 6/88 (25.2 overs)		155 (55.3 overs); Clayton August 30 (39); Zakariya Paruk 3/23 (12 overs)
		138 (40 overs) (f/o); Matthew Arnold 32* (68); Tyron Koen 6/36 (11 overs)

KwaZulu-Natal won by an innings and 74 runs
Willowmoore Park, Benoni
Umpires: Clifford Isaacs and Jurie Sadler

- KwaZulu-Natal won the toss and elected to bat.

12–14 October 2017
Scorecard

Northern Cape (South Africa)	v	Namibia
309 (81.1 overs); Driaan Bruwer 101 (216); Nicolaas Scholtz 4/72 (23 overs)		281 (78.5 overs); Stephan Baard 72 (127); Desmond de Koker 4/34 (12 overs)
231/9d (84.3 overs); Warren Bell 48 (79); Bernard Scholtz 5/54 (24 overs)		264/3 (55.4 overs); Jean Bredenkamp 114 (165); Akhona Kula 1/34 (9 overs)

Namibia won by 7 wickets
Wanderers Cricket Ground, Windhoek
Umpires: Andrew Louw and Phillip Vosloo

- Northern Cape won the toss and elected to bat.

19–21 October 2017
Scorecard

North West (South Africa)	v	(South Africa) KwaZulu-Natal
135 (36.3 overs); Janneman Malan 50 (43); Keith Dudgeon 4/45 (12 overs)		140 (43.4 overs); Michael Erlank 44 (114); Brady Barends 4/37 (15 overs)
188 (46.3 overs); Marques Ackerman 109* (114); Calvin Savage 4/44 (16 overs)		184/4 (51.2 overs); Calvin Savage 72* (85); Jovuan van Wyngaardt 2/64 (18 overs)

KwaZulu-Natal won by 6 wickets
Kingsmead Cricket Ground, Durban
Umpires: Siphelele Gasa and Phillip Vosloo

- KwaZulu-Natal won the toss and elected to field.

19–21 October 2017
Scorecard

Easterns (South Africa)	v	Namibia
184 (62.4 overs); Ernest Kemm 44 (140); Christiaan Snyman 3/18 (9 overs)		128 (46 overs); Craig Williams 31 (58); Clayton August 6/52 (16 overs)
154 (33 overs); Clayton August 36* (29); JJ Smit 5/29 (11 overs)		214/6 (54.5 overs); Jean Bredenkamp 73 (103); Grant Thomson 2/42 (10 overs)

Namibia won by 4 wickets
Willowmoore Park, Benoni
Umpires: Arno Jacobs and Kevin Lawrence

- Easterns won the toss and elected to bat.

26–28 October 2017
Scorecard

Eastern Province (South Africa)	v	(South Africa) Northern Cape
414/6d (94 overs); Kelly Smuts 102 (122); Themba Maupa 2/38 (9 overs)		241 (86 overs); Driaan Bruwer 84 (195); Tian Koekemoer 3/42 (14 overs)
		247/6 (89 overs) (f/o); Warren Bell 74 (160); Luvuyo Adam 2/18 (10 overs)

Match drawn
St George's Park Cricket Ground Port Elizabeth
Umpires: Bongani Ntshebe and Abdoellah Steenkamp

- Eastern Province won the toss and elected to bat.
- Themba Maupa (Northern Cape) made his first-class debut.

26–28 October 2017
Scorecard

Western Province (South Africa)	v	(South Africa) Border
171 (51.2 overs); Dayyaan Galiem 60 (94); Christiaan Jonker 3/22 (5.2 overs)		292/6d (73 overs); Bradley Williams 61 (96); George Linde 2/31 (6 overs)
122 (41.1 overs); George Linde 35* (59); Ayabulela Gqamane 4/35 (12 overs)		4/0 (1.3 overs); Gerhardt Abrahams 4* (3)

Border won by 10 wickets
Buffalo Park, East London
Umpires: Arno Jacobs and Thomas Mokorosi

- Border won the toss and elected to field.
- Renaldo Meyer (Western Province) made his first-class debut.

26–28 October 2017
Scorecard

Gauteng (South Africa)	v	(South Africa) Easterns
229 (66.5 overs); Tshepang Dithole 68 (111); Matthew Arnold 4/63 (16.5 overs)		302 (89.1 overs); Wesley Marshall 83 (149); Carmi le Roux 3/65 (23.1 overs)
340/7d (90 overs); Ryan Rickelton 163 (250); Clayton August 4/77 (18 overs)		154/6 (42 overs); Wesley Coulentianos 51 (110); Carmi le Roux 3/46 (11 overs)

Match drawn
Walter Milton Oval, Johannesburg
Umpires: Siphelele Gasa and Ryan Hendricks

- Easterns won the toss and elected to field.
- Muhammed Mayet, Tumelo Tlhokwe (Gauteng) and Zwelo Ntsimbini (Easterns) all made their first-class debuts.

26–28 October 2017
Scorecard

Namibia	v	(South Africa) Boland
531/8d (135 overs); Craig Williams 184 (220); Zakhele Qwabe 4/98 (25 overs)		362 (123.1 overs); Ricardo Vasconcelos 140 (225); Bernard Scholtz 4/92 (39.1 overs)
		115 (49.4 overs) (f/o); Murray Commins 52 (69); Bernard Scholtz 4/31 (19 overs)

Namibia won by an innings and 54 runs
Wanderers Cricket Ground, Windhoek
Umpires: Andrew Louw and Phillip Vosloo

- Namibia won the toss and elected to bat.
- Sinalo Gobeni and Curtley Louw (Boland) both made their first-class debuts.

=== November 2017 ===
2–4 November 2017
Scorecard

North West (South Africa)	v	(South Africa) Northern Cape
576/4d (101.3 overs); Kagiso Rapulana 259* (307); Mbulelo Budaza 2/77 (15 overs)		262 (79 overs); Aubrey Swanepoel 71 (92); Johannes Diseko 4/47 (24 overs)
		198/3 (72 overs) (f/o); Grant Mokoena 75 (153); Ayavuya Myoli 1/18 (9 overs)

Match drawn
Senwes Park, Potchefstroom
Umpires: Siphelele Gasa and Brad White

- North West won the toss and elected to bat.
- Ruan Haasbroek (North West) made his first-class debut.

2–4 November 2017
Scorecard

Eastern Province (South Africa)	v	(South Africa) South Western Districts
115 (35.2 overs); Matthew Breetzke 37* (63); Glenton Stuurman 5/24 (12.2 overs)		235 (87.2 overs); Obus Pienaar 50 (143); Basheeru-Deen Walters 2/33 (18 overs)
368/8d (122 overs); Kelly Smuts 170* (236); Obus Pienaar 3/46 (19 overs)

Match drawn
Recreation Ground, Oudtshoorn
Umpires: Clifford Isaacs and Thomas Mokorosi

- South Western Districts won the toss and elected to field.
- Bailey Aarons (South Western Districts) made his first-class debut.

2–4 November 2017
Scorecard

KwaZulu-Natal (South Africa)	v	(South Africa) KwaZulu-Natal Inland
375/7d (93.3 overs); Mishkal Ramsaroop 121 (249); Gareth Dukes 4/72 (17 overs)		190 (69.1 overs); Grant Roelofsen 62 (116); Zakariya Paruk 5/44 (19 overs)
21/2 (6.2 overs); Mishkal Ramsaroop 9* (19); Kerwin Mungroo 1/10 (3 overs)		205 (107.1 overs) (f/o); Attie Maposa 56 (175); Smangaliso Nhlebela 4/27 (25.1 overs)

KwaZulu-Natal won by 8 wickets
Chatsworth Stadium, Durban
Umpires: Lubabalo Gcuma and Arno Jacobs

- KwaZulu-Natal Inland won the toss and elected to field.

9–11 November 2017
Scorecard

Western Province (South Africa)	v	(South Africa) Boland
305 (87.1 overs); Zubayr Hamza 74 (107); Zakhele Qwabe 4/55 (22.1 overs)		266 (76.3 overs); Curtley Louw 52 (92); Mpilo Njoloza 3/49 (16.3 overs)
302/9d (86.4 overs); Kyle Verreynne 87 (94); Niel Botha 5/126 (38.4 overs)		344/3 (50.3 overs); Ferisco Adams 149 (125); Michael Cohen 2/57 (9 overs)

Boland won by 7 wickets
Western Province Cricket Club, Cape Town
Umpires: Marais Erasmus and Abdoellah Steenkamp

- Boland won the toss and elected to field.

9–11 November 2017
Scorecard

North West (South Africa)	v	(South Africa) Free State
305 (90.5 overs); Wihan Lubbe 75 (93); Corné Dry 4/54 (19.5 overs)		432 (119 overs); Leus du Plooy 114 (236); Craig Alexander 5/79 (23 overs)
134/3 (32 overs); Janneman Malan 80 (112); Corné Dry 3/27 (7 overs)

Match drawn
Senwes Park, Potchefstroom
Umpires: Ryan Hendricks and Marlon Jansen

- Free State won the toss and elected to field.

9–11 November 2017
Scorecard

Easterns (South Africa)	v	(South Africa) Northerns
342 (83.5 overs); Wesley Marshall 101 (126); Corbin Bosch 4/56 (18 overs)		183 (56.4 overs); Rivaldo Moonsamy 88 (143); Clayton August 4/34 (14 overs)
218 (52.1 overs); Wesley Marshall 59 (87); Thomas Kaber 5/50 (15.1 overs)		148 (48 overs); Roger Arendse 38 (40); Rowan Richards 6/20 (13 overs)

Easterns won by 229 runs
Technikon Oval, Pretoria
Umpires: Johan Cloete and Kevin Lawrence

- Northerns won the toss and elected to field.
- Mitchell Van Buuren (Northerns) made his first-class debut.

9–11 November 2017
Scorecard

Namibia	v	(South Africa) Gauteng
257 (102.5 overs); Stephan Baard 71 (271); Izak Cornelis Bergh 3/27 (13.5 overs)		247 (81.2 overs); Yaseen Valli 87 (137); Sarel Burger 3/33 (14.2 overs)
253/5d (70 overs); Stephan Baard 67 (131); Nono Pongolo 1/20 (9 overs)		99 (39.1 overs); Dominic Hendricks 42 (52); Danie van Schoor 5/27 (9 overs)

Namibia won by 164 runs
Wanderers Cricket Ground, Windhoek
Umpires: Rudi Birkenstock and Andrew Louw

- Namibia won the toss and elected to bat.
- Kgaudisa Molefe (Gauteng) made his first-class debut.

16–18 November 2017
Scorecard

KwaZulu-Natal (South Africa)	v	(South Africa) Northern Cape
218 (69.4 overs); Mishkal Ramsaroop 40 (86); Thandolwethu Mnyaka 5/53 (14.4 overs)		194 (86.1 overs); Driaan Bruwer 51 (147); Senuran Muthusamy 5/28 (21.1 overs)
223/9d (60 overs); Mishkal Ramsaroop 64 (117); Driaan Bruwer 3/30 (13 overs)		158 (42.3 overs); Warren Bell 31 (54); Senuran Muthusamy 5/62 (18.3 overs)

KwaZulu-Natal won by 89 runs
Diamond Oval, Kimberley
Umpires: Ryan Hendricks and Jurie Sadler

- Northern Cape won the toss and elected to field.
- Thula Ngcobo (KwaZulu-Natal) made his first-class debut.

16–18 November 2017
Scorecard

Gauteng (South Africa)	v	(South Africa) South Western Districts
219 (83.1 overs); Yassar Cook 32 (36); Glenton Stuurman 5/45 (19 overs)		227 (73 overs); Brendon Louw 47 (110); Sean Jamison 5/65 (21 overs)
239 (81.4 overs); Shaylen Pillay 85 (169); Obus Pienaar 2/19 (9.5 overs)		180/7 (73 overs); Obus Pienaar 58* (192); Nono Pongolo 4/33 (18 overs)

Match drawn
Recreation Ground, Oudtshoorn
Umpires: Lester Leendertz and Thomas Mokorosi

- South Western Districts won the toss and elected to field.

23–25 November 2017
Scorecard

Border (South Africa)	v	(South Africa) Eastern Province
512/4d (80.2 overs); Marco Marais 300* (191); Tladi Bokako 2/75 (17 overs)		212 (75.3 overs); Kirwin Christoffels 66 (141); Sithembile Langa 3/81 (18 overs)
66/2d (11.4 overs); Gerhardt Abrahams 46 (30); Luvuyo Adam 1/6 (2 overs)

Match drawn
Buffalo Park, East London
Umpires: Bongani Ntshebe and Jurie Sadler

- Eastern Province won the toss and elected to field.

23–25 November 2017
Scorecard

Western Province (South Africa)	v	(South Africa) North West
119 (39.5 overs); Pieter Malan 38 (46); Craig Alexander 3/33 (11.5 overs)		493/3 (100 overs); Janneman Malan 208* (288); Dayyaan Galiem 2/81 (18 overs)

Match drawn
Senwes Park, Potchefstroom
Umpires: Johan Cloete and Hassen Dawood

- Western Province won the toss and elected to bat.
- Louren Steenkamp (North West) made his first-class debut.

23–25 November 2017
Scorecard

Northerns (South Africa)	v	(South Africa) KwaZulu-Natal Inland
169 (61 overs); Jonathan Vandiar 65 (107); Graham Hume 7/23 (19 overs)		210 (86 overs); Grant Roelofsen 37 (112); Alfred Mothoa 3/22 (20 overs)
104/9 (36 overs); Rubin Hermann 34* (36); Ruhan Pretorius 3/21 (7 overs)

Match drawn
Tshwane University of Technology Oval, Pretoria
Umpires: Gladman Gaseba and Arno Jacobs

- KwaZulu-Natal Inland won the toss and elected to field.
- Rubin Hermann, Ruben Trumpelmann (Northerns), Allister Majola and Nduduzo Mfoza (KwaZulu-Natal Inland) all made their first-class debuts.

30 November–2 December 2017
Scorecard

Border (South Africa)	v	(South Africa) Northern Cape
115 (41 overs); Bradley Williams 29 (54); Thandolwethu Mnyaka 3/18 (11 overs)		434/8d (99.3 overs); Werner Coetsee 170* (237); Sithembile Langa 5/105 (21.3 overs)
285 (93.4 overs); Avumile Mnci 55 (121); Warren Bell 6/60 (13.4 overs)

Northern Cape won by an innings and 34 runs
Diamond Oval, Kimberley
Umpires: Rudi Birkenstock and Kevin Lawrence

- Border won the toss and elected to bat.

30 November–2 December 2017
Scorecard

Eastern Province (South Africa)	v	(South Africa) Western Province
349 (103 overs); Kirwin Christoffels 77 (149); Jason Smith 5/77 (20 overs)		195 (51.1 overs); Jason Smith 63 (111); Tladi Bokako 5/30 (12.1 overs)
147 (45 overs); Edward Moore 34 (45); Pieter Malan 5/35 (12 overs)		234/9 (97 overs); Jason Smith 70 (119); Brad Dolley 3/21 (15 overs)

Match drawn
Pollock Field, Port Elizabeth
Umpires: Thomas Mokorosi and Laurance Willemse

- Eastern Province won the toss and elected to bat.
- Myolisi Fumba and Emanuel Sererami (Western Province) both made their first-class debuts.

30 November–2 December 2017
Scorecard

South Western Districts (South Africa)	v	(South Africa) KwaZulu-Natal
337 (105.5 overs); Daniel Sincuba 63 (156); Zakariya Paruk 5/56 (22.5 overs)		387/9d (126.4 overs); Senuran Muthusamy 127 (238); Todd Walker 4/52 (22 overs)
164 (40.1 overs); Marcello Piedt 51 (58); Smangaliso Nhlebela 5/64 (13.1 overs)		91/4 (23 overs); Mishkal Ramsaroop 33 (45); Obus Pienaar 2/17 (5 overs)

Match drawn
Chatsworth Stadium, Durban
Umpires: Stephen Rex and Abdoellah Steenkamp

- KwaZulu-Natal won the toss and elected to field.

30 November–2 December 2017
Scorecard

Free State (South Africa)	v	(South Africa) Gauteng
234 (62.3 overs); Patrick Botha 74 (60); Nandre Burger 3/35 (15.3 overs)		134 (36.5 overs); Shaylen Pillay 29 (40); Corné Dry 5/27 (11.5 overs)
228/6d (75 overs); Diego Rosier 60 (109); Matt McGillivray 2/30 (20 overs)		214 (69.5 overs); Shaylen Pillay 69 (124); Loyiso Mdasha 3/41 (10.5 overs)

Free State won by 114 runs
Wanderers Cricket Club, Johannesburg
Umpires: Gladman Gaseba and Marlon Jansen

- Free State won the toss and elected to bat.
- Lefa Thaba (Gauteng) and Janko Dreyer (Free State) both made their first-class debuts.

=== December 2017 ===
7–9 December 2017
Scorecard

Boland (South Africa)	v	(South Africa) Border
168 (59.1 overs); Ricardo Vasconcelos 53 (67); Bongolwethu Makeleni 3/58 (21 overs)		125 (53.1 overs); Kabelo Sekhukhune 74 (168); Lizaad Williams 6/24 (16.1 overs)
73 (31.4 overs); Zakhele Qwabe 10* (7); Clayton Bosch 5/13 (5.4 overs)		117/6 (28.4 overs); Kabelo Sekhukhune 32 (48); Zakhele Qwabe 3/28 (4.4 overs)

Border won by 4 wickets
Buffalo Park, East London
Umpires: Clifford Isaacs and Abdoellah Steenkamp

- Boland won the toss and elected to bat.
- Bongolwethu Makeleni (Border) made his first-class debut.

7–9 December 2017
Scorecard

North West (South Africa)	v	(South Africa) KwaZulu-Natal Inland
152 (55 overs); Brady Barends 56 (109); Kerwin Mungroo 5/39 (14 overs)		83 (48.1 overs); Grant Roelofsen 21 (41); Jovuan van Wyngaardt 4/16 (18 overs)
256/6d (66 overs); Richardt Frenz 92 (145); Ruhan Pretorius 3/59 (18 overs)		274/6 (74.2 overs); Allister Majola 68 (126); Ayavuya Myoli 2/32 (11 overs)

Match drawn
City Oval, Pietermaritzburg
Umpires: Murray Brown and Lester Leendertz

- KwaZulu-Natal Inland won the toss and elected to field.

14–16 December 2017
Scorecard

Northern Cape (South Africa)	v	(South Africa) Northerns
286 (77.2 overs); Keegan Petersen 97 (134); Eldred Hawken 5/56 (17.2 overs)		442 (111.1 overs); Andrea Agathangelou 251 (323); Werner Coetsee 6/149 (45 overs)
210 (67.1 overs); Driaan Bruwer 39 (65); Thomas Kaber 6/81 (26 overs)		55/1 (11.1 overs); Andrea Agathangelou 29* (33); Werner Coetsee 1/17 (3 overs)

Northerns won by 9 wickets
Diamond Oval, Kimberley
Umpires: Siphelele Gasa and Marlon Jansen

- Northern Cape won the toss and elected to bat.
- Gregory Mahlokwana (Northerns) made his first-class debut.

14–16 December 2017
Scorecard

Easterns (South Africa)	v	(South Africa) Eastern Province
433/8d (95.3 overs); Matthew Arnold 150 (173); Kelly Smuts 2/55 (22 overs)		126 (41.4 overs); David White 38 (75); Morne Morkel 5/20 (14 overs)
		134 (37.4 overs) (f/o); Kirwin Christoffels 39 (54); Rowan Richards 5/28 (8 overs)

Easterns won by an innings and 173 runs
Willowmoore Park, Benoni
Umpires: Johan Cloete and Lubabalo Gcuma

- Easterns won the toss and elected to bat.

14–16 December 2017
Scorecard

KwaZulu-Natal (South Africa)	v	(South Africa) Western Province
75 (34.5 overs); Khalipha Cele 20 (58); Jason Smith 4/21 (11 overs)		424 (111.4 overs); Michael Loubser 95 (84); Calvin Savage 3/39 (16.4 overs)
318 (120.5 overs); Calvin Savage 94 (189); Junaid Dawood 4/111 (30.5 overs)

Western Province won by an innings and 31 runs
Western Province Cricket Club, Cape Town
Umpires: Murray Brown and Clifford Isaacs

- KwaZulu-Natal won the toss and elected to bat.

14–16 December 2017
Scorecard

KwaZulu-Natal Inland (South Africa)	v	(South Africa) Gauteng
195 (77.4 overs); Ruhan Pretorius 59 (115); Sean Jamison 4/33 (19 overs)		361 (108.2 overs); Dominic Hendricks 115 (223); Nduduzo Mfoza 3/43 (15.2 overs)
252 (78 overs); Grant Roelofsen 107* (205); Sean Jamison 4/33 (14 overs)		68/3 (9 overs); Ryan Rickelton 27 (10); Graham Hume 3/28 (5 overs)

Match drawn
City Oval, Pietermaritzburg
Umpires: Arno Jacobs and Abdoellah Steenkamp

- Gauteng won the toss and elected to field.

14–16 December 2017
Scorecard

Boland (South Africa)	v	(South Africa) Free State
238 (76.4 overs); Isma-eel Gafieldien 97 (181); Diego Rosier 3/9 (6.4 overs)		315 (84.3 overs); Patrick Botha 119 (140); Brandon Glover 4/83 (24 overs)
117 (41 overs); Kyle Simmonds 31 (43); Diego Rosier 2/7 (3 overs)		43/3 (12.3 overs); Leus du Plooy 16 (15); Zakhele Qwabe 1/1 (2 overs)

Free State won by 7 wickets
Mangaung Oval, Bloemfontein
Umpires: Thomas Mokorosi and Dennis Smith

- Boland won the toss and elected to bat.

=== January 2018 ===
4–6 January 2018
Scorecard

South Western Districts (South Africa)	v	(South Africa) North West
385/7d (104 overs); Obus Pienaar 119* (169); Kagiso Rapulana 1/33 (7 overs)		569/8 (168 overs); Andre Malan 151* (305); Obus Pienaar 4/146 (45 overs)

Match drawn
Recreation Ground, Oudtshoorn
Umpires: Stephen Rex and Jurie Sadler

- South Western Districts won the toss and elected to bat.

4–6 January 2018
Scorecard

Northerns (South Africa)	v	(South Africa) KwaZulu-Natal
157 (52.5 overs); Thomas Kaber 41 (123); Eathan Bosch 5/41 (12 overs)		372/7d (106.3 overs); Jason Oakes 102* (156); Eldred Hawken 3/54 (23.3 overs)
238 (92 overs); Victor Mahlangu 58 (119); Smangaliso Nhlebela 6/96 (38 overs)		24/1 (3.5 overs); Blayde Capell 17* (10); Migael Pretorius 1/3 (1.5 overs)

KwaZulu-Natal won by 9 wickets
Kingsmead Cricket Ground, Durban
Umpires: Kevin Lawrence and Bongani Ntshebe

- KwaZulu-Natal won the toss and elected to field.

4–6 January 2018
Scorecard

KwaZulu-Natal Inland (South Africa)	v	(South Africa) Eastern Province
132 (54.2 overs); Graham Hume 46 (79); Tladi Bokako 4/21 (14 overs)		298 (90 overs); Clyde Fortuin 144* (254); Kurtlyn Mannikam 3/80 (21 overs)
207 (71.3 overs); Ruhan Pretorius 57 (115); Luvuyo Adam 3/42 (25 overs)		43/3 (7.5 overs); David White 15 (11); Graham Hume 2/13 (3.5 overs)

Eastern Province won by 7 wickets
City Oval, Pietermaritzburg
Umpires: Gladman Gaseba and Laurance Willemse

- Eastern Province won the toss and elected to field.

4–6 January 2018
Scorecard

Easterns (South Africa)	v	(South Africa) Free State
303 (79 overs); Matthew Arnold 62 (101); Nealan van Heerden 3/32 (14 overs)		264 (77.3 overs); Patrick Botha 57 (99); Rowan Richards 5/56 (17.3 overs)
183 (54.3 overs); Grant Thomson 34 (45); Beyers Swanepoel 3/43 (12 overs)		223/7 (53.4 overs); Leus du Plooy 64 (130); Imran Manack 3/46 (10 overs)

Free State won by 3 wickets
Mangaung Oval, Bloemfontein
Umpires: Marlon Jansen and Jack Morton

- Easterns won the toss and elected to bat.

11–13 January 2018
Scorecard

KwaZulu-Natal Inland (South Africa)	v	(South Africa) Boland
354 (113.3 overs); Grant Roelofsen 124 (209); Kyle Simmonds 4/96 (37 overs)		171 (62.1 overs); David Bedingham 48 (91); Kurtlyn Mannikam 5/27 (13.1 overs)
		284/4 (91 overs) (f/o); David Bedingham 113 (213); Kushen Kishun 1/28 (9 overs)

Match drawn
Boland Park, Paarl
Umpires: Ryan Hendricks and Abdoellah Steenkamp

- KwaZulu-Natal Inland won the toss and elected to bat.
- Darryl Hendricks, Fritz de Beer and Phumza Mntungwa (Boland) all made their first-class debuts.

11–13 January 2018
Scorecard

Namibia	v	(South Africa) Eastern Province
226 (57 overs); Jan Frylinck 56 (78); Onke Nyaku 2/19 (6 overs)		120 (33.3 overs); Tladi Bokako 56 (58); Craig Williams 3/20 (6 overs)
214 (62.2 overs); Jan Frylinck 75 (76); Lutho Sipamla 3/26 (12 overs)		212 (51.5 overs); Mathew Christensen 66 (119); Christiaan Snyman 4/35 (8.5 overs)

Namibia won by 108 runs
St George's Park, Port Elizabeth
Umpires: Rudi Birkenstock and Jurie Sadler

- Eastern Province won the toss and elected to field.
- Niko Davin (Namibia) made his first-class debut.

11–13 January 2018
Scorecard

Free State (South Africa)	v	(South Africa) South Western Districts
314 (98.4 overs); Diego Rosier 118 (136); Bailey Aarons 3/32 (7.4 overs)		314 (89.5 overs); Obus Pienaar 139* (243); Patrick Botha 3/21 (7.5 overs)
241/6 (80 overs); Andries Gous 115 (196); Marcello Piedt 2/34 (17 overs)

Match drawn
Recreation Ground, Oudtshoorn
Umpires: Murray Brown and Stephen Rex

- South Western Districts won the toss and elected to field.

11–13 January 2018
Scorecard

Northern Cape (South Africa)	v	(South Africa) Western Province
191 (49.2 overs); Warren Bell 39 (52); Matthew Kleinveldt 3/17 (6.2 overs)		346 (105.1 overs); Zubayr Hamza 110 (178); Ottniel Baartman 4/58 (22 overs)
214 (64.1 overs); Jacques Snyman 101 (135); Michael Cohen 4/74 (16.1 overs)		65/1 (9 overs); Mathew Goles 28 (29); Driaan Bruwer 1/11 (1 over)

Western Province won by 9 wickets
Diamond Oval, Kimberley
Umpires: Siphelele Gasa and Marlon Jansen

- Northern Cape won the toss and elected to bat.
- Mathew Goles and Bonga Makaka (Western Province) both made their first-class debuts.

18–20 January 2018
Scorecard

Western Province (South Africa)	v	(South Africa) Northerns
215 (71.1 overs); Matthew Kleinveldt 97 (146); Stefan Klopper 4/41 (13.1 overs)		188 (78.5 overs); Victor Mahlangu 61 (115); Michael Cohen 4/29 (13.5 overs)
156 (56 overs); Mathew Goles 50 (100); Eldred Hawken 3/35 (13 overs)		128 (45.5 overs); Lerato Kgoatle 44 (64); Dane Piedt 4/10 (7.5 overs)

Western Province won by 55 runs
Western Province Cricket Club, Cape Town
Umpires: Jurie Sadler and Abdoellah Steenkamp

- Northerns won the toss and elected to field.
- Dalen Mmako (Northerns) made his first-class debut.

18–20 January 2018
Scorecard

Namibia	v	(South Africa) Border
157 (37.5 overs); Niko Davin 85 (73); Phaphama Fojela 4/39 (13 overs)		361 (102.5 overs); Gionne Koopman 101 (228); Sarel Burger 3/48 (19 overs)
230 (60.3 overs); Craig Williams 87 (122); Phaphama Fojela 4/40 (16.3 overs)		27/2 (11.3 overs); Gerhardt Abrahams 15 (19); Tangeni Lungameni 1/6 (5.3 overs)

Border won by 8 wickets
Buffalo Park, East London
Umpires: Hassen Dawood and Arno Jacobs

- Border won the toss and elected to field.

18–20 January 2018
Scorecard

Gauteng (South Africa)	v	(South Africa) Boland
149 (42.5 overs); Ryan Rickelton 47 (64); Ferisco Adams 5/24 (12 overs)		119 (50.4 overs); David Bedingham 26 (36); Ndumiso Mvelase 3/13 (11 overs)
306/6d (76 overs); Ryan Rickelton 129 (166); Zakhele Qwabe 3/40 (13 overs)		182 (66.4 overs); Charl Cyster 60 (123); Nandre Burger 5/55 (20.4 overs)

Gauteng won by 154 runs
Orban Park, Johannesburg
Umpires: Rudi Birkenstock and Lubabalo Gcuma

- Boland won the toss and elected to field.

25–27 January 2018
Scorecard

South Western Districts (South Africa)	v	(South Africa) Northern Cape
388/8d (117.1 overs); Daniel Sincuba 154 (288); Akhona Kula 2/61 (19.1 overs)		197 (70.3 overs); Jacques Snyman 66 (93); Marcello Piedt 4/64 (24 overs)
		83/2 (18.2 overs) (f/o); Jacques Snyman 37 (40); Glenton Stuurman 1/6 (4.4 overs)

Match drawn
Diamond Oval, Kimberley
Umpires: Ryan Hendricks and Stephen Rex

- Northern Cape won the toss and elected to field.

=== February 2018 ===
1–3 February 2018
Scorecard

Border (South Africa)	v	(South Africa) KwaZulu-Natal Inland
128 (43 overs); Jerry Nqolo 45 (78); Graham Hume 6/30 (14 overs)		349 (93.5 overs); Luke Schlemmer 53 (108); Phaphama Fojela 5/79 (22.5 overs)
144 (46.2 overs); Jerry Nqolo 38 (92); Ruhan Pretorius 4/41 (12.2 overs)

KwaZulu-Natal Inland won by an innings and 77 runs
City Oval, Pietermaritzburg
Umpires: Gladman Gaseba and Jurie Sadler

- KwaZulu-Natal Inland won the toss and elected to field.
- Mpho Ndumo (KwaZulu-Natal Inland) made his first-class debut.

1–3 February 2018
Scorecard

Namibia	v	(South Africa) South Western Districts
323 (82.2 overs); Niko Davin 70 (69); Marcello Piedt 5/79 (21.2 overs)		132 (58.3 overs); Brendon Louw 41 (115); Bernard Scholtz 3/18 (10.3 overs)
248 (69.3 overs); JP Kotze 102 (99); Bradley de Villiers 7/79 (25 overs)		114/3 (45 overs); Obus Pienaar 56* (86); Bernard Scholtz 2/33 (14 overs)

Match drawn
Wanderers Cricket Ground, Windhoek
Umpires: Marlon Jansen and Claude Thorburn

- Namibia won the toss and elected to bat.
- Bradley de Villiers (South Western Districts) made his first class debut.

8–10 February 2018
Scorecard

KwaZulu-Natal (South Africa)	v	Namibia
351/6d (98 overs); Dudu Zondo 91 (161); Karl Birkenstock 2/44 (9 overs)		159 (57.2 overs); Christopher Coombe 44 (74); Calvin Savage 2/12 (8 overs)
		120 (54.3 overs) (f/o); Gerrie Snyman 41 (94); Daryn Dupavillon 4/15 (11.3 overs)

KwaZulu-Natal won by an innings and 72 runs
Kingsmead Cricket Ground, Durban
Umpires: Murray Brown and Bongani Ntshebe

- Namibia won the toss and elected to field.
- Nicol Loftie-Eaton, Mauritius Ngupita and Ben Shikongo (Namibia) all made their first-class debuts.

8–10 February 2018
Scorecard

Gauteng (South Africa)	v	(South Africa) Western Province
177 (54.2 overs); Matt McGillivray 60 (85); Mpilo Njoloza 3/39 (13 overs)		278 (108.2 overs); Qaasim Adams 75 (158); Nandre Burger 3/86 (26 overs)
214 (91.5 overs); Matt McGillivray 47 (95); Junaid Dawood 4/33 (21 overs)		115/6 (36.2 overs); Jack Newby 49* (112); Nandre Burger 3/28 (9.2 overs)

Western Province won by 4 wickets
Western Province Cricket Club, Cape Town
Umpires: Rudi Birkenstock and Thomas Mokorosi

- Gauteng won the toss and elected to bat.

8–10 February 2018
Scorecard

Easterns (South Africa)	v	(South Africa) Boland
235 (80.4 overs); Ryan Cartwright 45* (99); Nkululeko Serame 3/44 (17.4 overs)		157 (57.4 overs); Kyle Simmonds 33 (56); Clayton August 3/40 (18.4 overs)
297/6d (72 overs); Wesley Marshall 95 (133); Kyle Simmonds 3/99 (25 overs)		325/8 (95 overs); David Bedingham 147 (226); Tumelo Simelane 4/106 (29 overs)

Match drawn
Boland Park, Paarl
Umpires: Clifford Isaacs and Marlon Jansen

- Easterns won the toss and elected to bat.

15–17 February 2018
Scorecard

Northerns (South Africa)	v	(South Africa) North West
283 (83 overs); Thomas Kaber 79* (151); Johannes Diseko 3/45 (13 overs)		251 (81.1 overs); Janneman Malan 116 (199); Stefan Klopper 3/50 (19.1 overs)
176/7d (61.5 overs); Thomas Kaber 50 (84); Johannes Diseko 3/43 (21 overs)		199/4 (41 overs); Janneman Malan 91 (116); Migael Pretorius 2/43 (8 overs)

Match drawn
Centurion Park, Centurion
Umpires: Marlon Jansen and Stephen Rex

- North West won the toss and elected to field.

15–17 February 2018
Scorecard

South Western Districts (South Africa)	v	(South Africa) Border
370/4d (108.4 overs); Hanno Kotze 153* (189); Jason Niemand 4/145 (31 overs)		158 (66.1 overs); Somila Seyibokwe 31 (95); Obus Pienaar 3/18 (10.1 overs)
		303/7d (113 overs) (f/o); Marco Marais 100 (139)

Match drawn
Recreation Ground, Oudtshoorn
Umpires: Jurie Sadler and Abdoellah Steenkamp

- Hershell America (South Western Districts), Sinethemba Qeshile, Jason Niemand and Bamanye Xenxe (Border) all made their first-class debuts.

15–17 February 2018
Scorecard

Namibia	v	(South Africa) KwaZulu-Natal Inland
189 (43.1 overs); Gerrie Snyman 101 (77); Ruhan Pretorius 4/34 (12 overs)		491/7d (100 overs); Grant Roelofsen 224* (276); Ben Shikongo 3/87 (20 overs)
159 (65 overs); Michau du Preez 28 (82); Ruhan Pretorius 5/45 (19 overs)

KwaZulu-Natal Inland won by an innings and 143 runs
City Oval, Pietermaritzburg
Umpires: Rudi Birkenstock and Gladman Gaseba

- Namibia won the toss and elected to bat.

22–24 February 2018
Scorecard

KwaZulu-Natal (South Africa)	v	(South Africa) Boland
264 (92.3 overs); Jason Oakes 81 (186); Ferisco Adams 3/43 (17.3 overs)		400/8d (95 overs); Ferisco Adams 125* (108); Calvin Savage 3/81 (24 overs)
110 (63 overs); Michael Erlank 36 (148); Nkululeko Serame 4/31 (17 overs)

Boland won by an innings and 26 runs
Boland Park, Paarl
Umpires: Dennis Smith and Clifford Isaacs

- Boland won the toss and elected to field.

22–24 February 2018
Scorecard

Eastern Province (South Africa)	v	(South Africa) Gauteng
375/8d (124 overs); David White 157 (336); Matt McGillivray 4/39 (20 overs)		148 (71.3 overs); Dominic Hendricks 57 (142); Jade de Klerk 5/50 (25 overs)
		82 (52.4 overs) (f/o); Shaylen Pillay 30 (123); Solo Nqweni 3/4 (4 overs)

Eastern Province won by an innings and 145 runs
ABSA Oval, Port Elizabeth
Umpires: Murray Brown and Abdoellah Steenkamp

- Gauteng won the toss and elected to field.
- Jade de Klerk (Eastern Province) made his first-class debut.

22–24 February 2018
Scorecard

Free State (South Africa)	v	Namibia
369 (117.1 overs); Andries Gous 132 (148); Bernard Scholtz 4/97 (33.1 overs)		355 (113.1 overs); Stephan Baard 58 (95); Tshepo Ntuli 5/112 (40.1 overs)
132/3d (47 overs); Paballo Mogoera 63* (140); Sarel Burger 1/17 (6 overs)

Match drawn
Wanderers Cricket Ground, Windhoek
Umpires: Andrew Louw and Arno Jacobs

- Free State won the toss and elected to bat.

22–24 February 2018
Scorecard

North West (South Africa)	v	(South Africa) Easterns
205 (64.2 overs); Edrich Lubbe 62 (105); Matthew Arnold 5/51 (18 overs)		305 (93 overs); Grant Thomson 97 (170); Brady Barends 4/60 (24 overs)
188 (47.2 overs); Wihan Lubbe 39 (95); Ryan Cartwright 5/62 (14.2 overs)		89/3 (22.1 overs); Grant Thomson 27* (37); Brady Barends 2/17 (9 overs)

Easterns won by 7 wickets
Senwes Park, Potchefstroom
Umpires: Ryan Hendricks and Kevin Lawrence

- Easterns won the toss and elected to field.

=== March 2018 ===
1–3 March 2018
Scorecard

Northern Cape (South Africa)	v	(South Africa) Free State
510/6d (99.2 overs); Jacques Snyman 209 (222); Eddie Leie 4/164 (34 overs)		307 (87.4 overs); Raynard van Tonder 126 (181); Thandolwethu Mnyaka 3/51 (17.4 overs)
		246/3 (57 overs) (f/o); Patrick Botha 119* (147); Thandolwethu Mnyaka 3/41 (11 overs)

Match drawn
Mangaung Oval, Bloemfontein
Umpires: Murray Brown and Thomas Mokorosi

- Free State won the toss and elected to field.

1–3 March 2018
Scorecard

South Western Districts (South Africa)	v	(South Africa) Northerns
86 (33.2 overs); Bailey Aarons 17 (23); Corbin Bosch 4/11 (9.2 overs)		242 (74 overs); Migael Pretorius 81* (112); Marcello Piedt 4/67 (19 overs)
439/8d (119.3 overs); Obus Pienaar 186 (272); Thomas Kaber 4/140 (31.3 overs)		96/2 (30 overs); Rubin Hermann 34* (66); Marcello Piedt 1/23 (6 overs)

Match drawn
Tshwane University of Technology Oval, Pretoria
Umpires: Ryan Hendricks and Clifford Isaacs

- South Western Districts won the toss and elected to bat.
- Wandile Makwetu (Northerns) made his first-class debut.

8–10 March 2018
Scorecard

Eastern Province (South Africa)	v	(South Africa) Boland
134 (49.1 overs); Onke Nyaku 37 (66); Ferisco Adams 4/38 (16 overs)		221 (56.2 overs); Darryl Hendricks 50 (99); Lutho Sipamla 4/52 (12.2 overs)
257 (85.1 overs); Tian Koekemoer 104 (198); Ferisco Adams 6/76 (22 overs)		171/7 (53.4 overs); Simon Khomari 57 (123); Lutho Sipamla 5/60 (19 overs)

Boland won by 3 wickets
Boland Park, Paarl
Umpires: Murray Brown and Nitin Menon

- Eastern Province won the toss and elected to bat.

8–10 March 2018
Scorecard

Easterns (South Africa)	v	(South Africa) Northern Cape
286 (88.1 overs); Wesley Coulentianos 76 (172); Desmond de Koker 7/58 (17.1 overs)		119 (39.5 overs); Patrick Kruger 40 (55); Matthew Arnold 4/17 (4.5 overs)
		226/6 (69 overs) (f/o); Luthando Mnyanda 83 (144); Clayton August 2/30 (11 overs)

Match drawn
Willowmoore Park, Benoni
Umpires: Jurie Sadler and Hassen Dawood

- Northern Cape won the toss and elected to field.
- Only three balls were bowled on day 1 due to rain.

8–10 March 2018
Scorecard

Border (South Africa)	v	(South Africa) North West
106 (37.3 overs); Jason Niemand 31 (64); Andre Malan 5/37 (13 overs)		276/3d (61 overs); Janneman Malan 131* (178); Phaphama Fojela 2/43 (9 overs)
284 (93.5 overs); Gionne Koopman 73 (96); Kevin Crowie 3/38 (13 overs)		36/3 (5 overs); Edrich Lubbe 11* (8); Phaphama Fojela 2/16 (3 overs)

Match drawn
Senwes Park, Potchefstroom
Umpires: Arno Jacobs and Lubabalo Gcuma

- North West won the toss and elected to field.
- No play was possible on day 1 due to rain.
- Kevin Crowie (North West) made his first-class debut.

8–10 March 2018
Scorecard

Gauteng (South Africa)	v	(South Africa) Northerns

Match abandoned
University of the Witwatersrand, Johannesburg
Umpires: Abdoellah Steenkamp and Phillip Vosloo

- No toss.
- No play was possible due to rain.

15–17 March 2018
Scorecard

KwaZulu-Natal Inland (South Africa)	v	(South Africa) Free State
350 (97.3 overs); Grant Roelofsen 87 (203); Eddie Leie 5/98 (21.3 overs)		144 (57.5 overs); Romano Terblanche 34* (75); Graham Hume 5/25 (17 overs)
		192 (64.1 overs) (f/o); Raynard van Tonder 92 (170); Gareth Dukes 5/65 (18 overs)

KwaZulu-Natal Inland won by an innings and 14 runs
Mangaung Oval, Bloemfontein
Umpires: Thomas Mokorosi and Clifford Isaacs

- Free State won the toss and elected to field.

15–17 March 2018
Scorecard

Western Province (South Africa)	v	(South Africa) South Western Districts
304/8d (100 overs); George Linde 82 (119); Obus Pienaar 2/58 (14 overs)		199 (60 overs); Obus Pienaar 80 (124); Michael Cohen 5/40 (14 overs)
173/6d (48.2 overs); Jason Smith 36 (83); Glenton Stuurman 3/69 (17 overs)		109 (37.3 overs); Hanno Kotze 45 (81); Michael Cohen 4/30 (7.3 overs)

Western Province won by 169 runs
Western Province Cricket Club, Cape Town
Umpires: Siphelele Gasa and Ryan Hendricks

- South Western Districts won the toss and elected to field.

22–24 March 2018
Scorecard

Northerns (South Africa)	v	(South Africa) Boland
252 (82 overs); Jiveshan Pillay 51 (120); Kyle Simmonds 3/67 (20 overs)		272 (77.1 overs); David Bedingham 95 (133); Luvuyo Nkese 4/44 (9.1 overs)
230 (84.5 overs); Wandile Makwetu 63 (164); Zakhele Qwabe 3/47 (17 overs)		150 (41.2 overs); David Bedingham 35 (54); Migael Pretorius 5/41 (11.2 overs)

Northerns won by 60 runs
Boland Park, Paarl
Umpires: Lubabalo Gcuma and Johan Cloete

- Boland won the toss and elected to field.

22–24 March 2018
Scorecard

KwaZulu-Natal (South Africa)	v	(South Africa) Border
260 (69.3 overs); Khalipha Cele 52 (109); Malwande Zamo 4/37 (14.3 overs)		136 (30.3 overs); Jerry Nqolo 44 (44); Zakariya Paruk 3/23 (6 overs)
176/3d (41.2 overs); Michael Erlank 66 (113); Malwande Zamo 2/35 (9 overs)		117/4 (46 overs); Mkhululi Calana 55 (97); Smangaliso Nhlebela 2/39 (16 overs)

Match drawn
Buffalo Park, East London
Umpires: Philip Vosloo and Thomas Mokorosi

- Border won the toss and elected to field.
- Malwande Zamo (Border) made his first-class debut.

22–24 March 2018
Scorecard

Easterns (South Africa)	v	(South Africa) KwaZulu-Natal Inland
277/7d (75.2 overs); Grant Thomson 102* (156); Kyle Nipper 2/21 (8 overs)		96/5 (30.5 overs); Lefa Mosena 22 (47); Rowan Richards 3/29 (8 overs)

Match drawn
Willowmoore Park, Benoni
Umpires: Arno Jacobs and Brad White

- KwaZulu-Natal Inland won the toss and elected to field.
- No play was possible on days 1 and 2 due to rain.

22–24 March 2018
Scorecard

Free State (South Africa)	v	(South Africa) Western Province
435/7d (96.5 overs); Leus du Plooy 168 (240); Dayyaan Galiem 2/73 (17 overs)		116/2 (27 overs); Matthew Kleinveldt 59 (78); Patrick Botha 1/7 (4 overs)

Match drawn
Mangaung Oval, Bloemfontein
Umpires: Abdoellah Steenkamp and Stephen Harris

- Free State won the toss and elected to bat.
- No play was possible on day 1 due to rain.

== Final ==
12–15 April 2018
Scorecard

Namibia	v	(South Africa) KwaZulu-Natal
132 (39.3 overs); Gerhard Erasmus 34 (44); Senuran Muthusamy 5/18 (12.3 overs)		334/4d (93.1 overs); Michael Erlank 139 (253); Gerhard Erasmus 2/46 (10 overs)
177 (53.1 overs); Jan Frylinck 68 (99); Keith Dudgeon 5/32 (8.1 overs)

KwaZulu-Natal won by an innings and 25 runs
Kingsmead Cricket Ground, Durban
Umpires: Jurie Sadler and Marlon Jansen

- KwaZulu-Natal won the toss and elected to field.
