= 2017–18 CSA Provincial One-Day Challenge =

Cricket tournament

- Dates: 15 October 2017 – 8 April 2018
- Administrator: Cricket South Africa
- Cricket format: List A
- Tournament format: Round-robin
- Champions: (South Africa) North West (1st title)
- Participants: 14
- Most runs: Janneman Malan (500)
- Most wickets: Dyllan Matthews (21)

The 2017–18 CSA Provincial One-Day Challenge was a List A cricket competition that took place in South Africa from 15 October 2017 to 8 April 2018. The competition was played between the thirteen South African provincial teams and Namibia. The tournament was played in parallel with the 2017–18 Sunfoil 3-Day Cup, a first-class competition which featured the same teams. Northerns were the defending champions.

Following Namibia's fixture against Free State in February 2018, Namibia's captain Sarel Burger and vice-captain Craig Williams retired from cricket.

The final was played between Gauteng and North West at the Wanderers Stadium in Johannesburg on 8 April 2018. North West won the match to claim their first tile, beating Gauteng by 34 runs. Cricket South Africa's acting Chief Executive, Thabang Moroe, congratulated North West on winning the title.

== Fixtures ==
=== October 2017 ===
15 October 2017
Scorecard

Eastern Province (South Africa); 104 (30.1 overs)	v	(South Africa) Free State; 107/7 (30.1 overs)
Kelly Smuts 57 (63); Romano Terblanche 5/25 (9.1 overs)		Andries Gous 37 (37); Solo Nqweni 3/15 (6 overs)

Free State won by 3 wickets
St George's Park, Port Elizabeth
Umpires: Murray Brown and Siphelele Gasa

- Free State won the toss and elected to field.
- Loyiso Mdasha and Beyers Swanepoel (Free State) both made their List A debuts.

15 October 2017
Scorecard

Gauteng (South Africa); 155 (37.1 overs)	v	(South Africa) North West; 157/6 (38.1 overs)
Yaseen Valli 35 (44); Ayavuya Myoli 3/15 (3.1 overs)		Kagiso Rapulana 28 (64); Nandre Burger 3/38 (10 overs)

North West won by 4 wickets
New Wanderers Stadium, Johannesburg
Umpires: Lubabalo Gcuma and Arno Jacobs

- North West won the toss and elected to field.
- Tumelo Tlhokwe (Gauteng) made his List A debut.

15 October 2017
Scorecard

Northerns (South Africa); 274/6 (49 overs)	v	(South Africa) Border; 277/6 (46.5 overs)
Jiveshan Pillay 109 (128); Clayton Bosch 3/60 (10 overs)		Gerhardt Abrahams 88 (111); Albie Morkel 1/20 (4 overs)

Border won by 4 wickets
Centurion Park, Centurion
Umpires: Hassen Dawood and Stephen Harris

- Border won the toss and elected to field.
- Jiveshan Pillay, Luvuyo Nkese (Northerns), Bamanye Xenxe and Tsepo Ndwandwa (Border) all made their List A debuts.

15 October 2017
Scorecard

Easterns (South Africa); 142 (34 overs)	v	(South Africa) KwaZulu-Natal; 146/3 (30.4 overs)
Wesley Marshall 52 (72); Michael Erlank 4/15 (6 overs)		Jason Oakes 44* (52); Grant Thomson 2/21 (6 overs)

KwaZulu-Natal won by 7 wickets
Willowmoore Park, Benoni
Umpires: Clifford Isaacs and Jurie Sadler

- Easterns won the toss and elected to bat.
- Xolane Shongwe (Easterns), Blayde Capell and Jason Wagener (KwaZulu-Natal) all made their List A debuts.

15 October 2017
Scorecard

Namibia; 253/6 (50 overs)	v	(South Africa) Northern Cape; 257/9 (49.4 overs)
Craig Williams 66 (84); Driaan Bruwer 2/50 (6 overs)		Warren Bell 77 (80); Jan Frylinck 2/46 (9 overs)

Northern Cape won by 1 wicket
Wanderers Cricket Ground, Windhoek
Umpires: Claude Thorburn and Phillip Vosloo

- Northern Cape won the toss and elected to field.

22 October 2017
Scorecard

North West (South Africa); 194 (45 overs)	v	(South Africa) KwaZulu-Natal; 144 (42.5 overs)
Janneman Malan 62 (57); Zakariya Paruk 3/29 (10 overs)		Khalipha Cele 28 (51); Dyllan Matthews 5/27 (7.5 overs)

North West won by 50 runs
Kingsmead Cricket Ground, Durban
Umpires: Siphelele Gasa and Phillip Vosloo

- North West won the toss and elected to bat.
- Andile Mokgakane (KwaZulu-Natal) made his List A debut.

22 October 2017
Scorecard

Easterns (South Africa); 245/8 (50 overs)	v	Namibia; 233/7 (41.4 overs)
Kyle Degambur 61 (90); Craig Williams 3/44 (10 overs)		Jean-Pierre Kotze 85* (50); Kofi Apea-Adu 3/40 (9 overs)

Namibia won by 3 wickets (D/L method)
Willowmoore Park, Benoni
Umpires: Arno Jacobs and Kevin Lawrence

- Namibia won the toss and elected to field.
- Namibia were set a revised target of 233 from 43 overs.
- Zwelo Ntsimbini (Easterns) made his List A debut.

29 October 2017
Scorecard

Northern Cape (South Africa); 179 (46.3 overs)	v	(South Africa) Eastern Province; 185/8 (34.1 overs)
Zakir Kathrada 71 (139); Kelly Smuts 3/21 (4.3 overs)		Andrew Birch 64 (49); Warren Bell 3/32 (10 overs)

Eastern Province won by 2 wickets
Pollock Field Port Elizabeth
Umpires: Bongani Ntshebe and Abdoellah Steenkamp

- Eastern Province won the toss and elected to field.

29 October 2017
Scorecard

Western Province (South Africa); 353/6 (50 overs)	v	(South Africa) Border; 357/4 (49 overs)
Qaasim Adams 92 (86); Gionne Koopman 2/50 (10 overs)		Christiaan Jonker 108* (73); George Linde 2/58 (9 overs)

Border won by 6 wickets
Buffalo Park, East London
Umpires: Arno Jacobs and Thomas Mokorosi

- Western Province won the toss and elected to bat.

29 October 2017
Scorecard

Gauteng (South Africa); 179/9 (50 overs)	v	(South Africa) Easterns; 158 (40.4 overs)
Nono Pongolo 50 (73); David Wiese 4/21 (10 overs)		Imran Manack 37 (29); Nandre Burger 4/29 (8.4 overs)

Gauteng won by 21 runs
Walter Milton Oval, Johannesburg
Umpires: Siphelele Gasa and Ryan Hendricks

- Easterns won the toss and elected to field.
- Muhammed Mayet (Gauteng) made his List A debut.

29 October 2017
Scorecard

Namibia; 323/9 (50 overs)	v	(South Africa) Boland; 202 (36.3 overs)
Jean Bredenkamp 164* (134); Zakhele Qwabe 2/36 (7 overs)		Kyle Simmonds 56 (47); Nicolaas Scholtz 3/22 (7 overs)

Namibia won by 121 runs
Wanderers Cricket Ground, Windhoek
Umpires: Andrew Louw and Phillip Vosloo

- Namibia won the toss and elected to bat.
- Curtley Louw and Sinalo Gobeni (Boland) both made their List A debuts.

=== November 2017 ===
5 November 2017
Scorecard

North West (South Africa); 328/8 (50 overs)	v	(South Africa) Northern Cape; 109 (28.5 overs)
Janneman Malan 169 (142); Mbulelo Budaza 3/56 (8 overs)		Jacques Snyman 39 (48); Dyllan Matthews 3/16 (3.5 overs)

North West won by 219 runs
Senwes Park, Potchefstroom
Umpires: Siphelele Gasa and Brad White

- Northern Cape won the toss and elected to field.

5 November 2017
Scorecard

South Western Districts (South Africa); 203 (46.2 overs)	v	(South Africa) Eastern Province; 194 (49 overs)
Obus Pienaar 70 (84); Brad Dolley 3/23 (10 overs)		Solo Nqweni 43 (68); Glenton Stuurman 4/39 (10 overs)

South Western Districts won by 9 runs
Recreation Ground, Oudtshoorn
Umpires: Clifford Isaacs and Thomas Mokorosi

- South Western Districts won the toss and elected to bat.

5 November 2017
Scorecard

KwaZulu-Natal Inland (South Africa); 271 (50 overs)	v	(South Africa) KwaZulu-Natal; 125 (29.1 overs)
Ruhan Pretorius 67 (78); Smangaliso Nhlebela 4/52 (9 overs)		Blayde Capell 39 (35); Gareth Dukes 4/32 (9.1 overs)

KwaZulu-Natal Inland won by 146 runs
Chatsworth Stadium, Durban
Umpires: Lubabalo Gcuma and Arno Jacobs

- KwaZulu-Natal Inland won the toss and elected to bat.

12 November 2017
Scorecard

Western Province (South Africa); 227 (44.2 overs)	v	(South Africa) Boland; 109 (34.1 overs)
Michael Loubser 79* (55); Ziyaad Abrahams 3/49 (9 overs)		Simon Khomari 21 (34); Matthew Kleinveldt 4/8 (5.1 overs)

Western Province won by 118 runs
Western Province Cricket Club, Cape Town
Umpires: Marais Erasmus and Abdoellah Steenkamp

- Boland won the toss and elected to field.

12 November 2017
Scorecard

Free State (South Africa); 100 (28 overs)	v	(South Africa) North West; 103/2 (15.1 overs)
Romano Terblanche 21 (23); Craig Alexander 3/27 (8 overs)		Janneman Malan 44 (30); Tshepo Motaung 1/20 (3 overs)

North West won by 8 wickets
Senwes Park, Potchefstroom
Umpires: Ryan Hendricks and Marlon Jansen

- Free State won the toss and elected to bat.

12 November 2017
Scorecard

Easterns (South Africa); 239/7 (50 overs)	v	(South Africa) Northerns; 81/1 (14 overs)
Sizwe Masondo 71 (103); Luvuyo Nkese 3/46 (9 overs)		Andrea Agathangelou 55* (40); Tumelo Simelane 1/22 (3 overs)

No result
LC de Villiers Oval, Pretoria
Umpires: Johan Cloete and Kevin Lawrence

- Northerns won the toss and elected to field.
- Ruben Trumpelmann (Northerns) made his List A debut.

12 November 2017
Scorecard

Namibia; 155 (38.2 overs)	v	(South Africa) Gauteng; 159/8 (48.4 overs)
Jan Frylinck 47 (66); Nandre Burger 3/21 (7 overs)		Matt McGillivray 42* (42); Jan Frylinck 4/37 (9.4 overs)

Gauteng won by 2 wickets
Wanderers Cricket Ground, Windhoek
Umpires: Rudi Birkenstock and Claude Thorburn

- Namibia won the toss and elected to bat.
- Kgaudisa Molefe (Gauteng) made his List A debut.

19 November 2017
Scorecard

KwaZulu-Natal (South Africa); 287 (48.2 overs)	v	(South Africa) Northern Cape; 207 (47.3 overs)
Senuran Muthusamy 80 (90); Patrick Kruger 3/39 (7 overs)		Keegan Petersen 61 (72); Senuran Muthusamy 3/52 (10 overs)

KwaZulu-Natal won by 80 runs
Diamond Oval, Kimberley
Umpires: Ryan Hendricks and Jurie Sadler

- KwaZulu-Natal won the toss and elected to bat.
- Thula Ngcobo (KwaZulu-Natal) made his List A debut.

19 November 2017
Scorecard

Gauteng (South Africa); 245 (45 overs)	v	(South Africa) South Western Districts; 210 (44.3 overs)
Yaseen Valli 130 (159); Hanno Kotze 2/13 (2 overs)		Brendon Louw 47 (51); Chad Classen 4/32 (10 overs)

Gauteng won by 35 runs
Recreation Ground, Oudtshoorn
Umpires: Lester Leendertz and Thomas Mokorosi

- Gauteng won the toss and elected to bat.
- Bailey Aarons (South Western Districts) made his List A debut.

26 November 2017
Scorecard

Eastern Province (South Africa); 324/4 (50 overs)	v	(South Africa) Border; 220/6 (35.2 overs)
Edward Moore 158 (128); Sithembile Langa 3/67 (10 overs)		Marco Marais 76* (47); Lutho Sipamla 2/44 (6 overs)

Eastern Province won by 24 runs (D/L method)
Buffalo Park, East London
Umpires: Bongani Ntshebe and Jurie Sadler

- Border won the toss and elected to field.
- Border were set a revised target of 245 from 35.2 overs.

26 November 2017
Scorecard

North West (South Africa); 240 (45.5 overs)	v	(South Africa) Western Province; 237/7 (50 overs)
Richardt Frenz 80 (90); Tshepo Moreki 4/45 (9.5 overs)		Wayne Parnell 65 (83); Dyllan Matthews 5/47 (10 overs)

North West won by 3 runs
Senwes Park, Potchefstroom
Umpires: Johan Cloete and Hassen Dawood

- Western Province won the toss and elected to field.
- Shane Dadswell (North West) and Luke Philander (Western Province) both made their List A debuts.

26 November 2017
Scorecard

Northerns (South Africa); 302/5 (50 overs)	v	(South Africa) KwaZulu-Natal Inland; 148 (35.5 overs)
Jonathan Vandiar 88 (107); Ruhan Pretorius 3/63 (10 overs)		Ruhan Pretorius 51 (64); Ruben Trumpelmann 3/28 (10 overs)

Northerns won by 154 runs
Tshwane University of Technology Oval, Pretoria
Umpires: Gladman Gaseba and Arno Jacobs

- KwaZulu-Natal Inland won the toss and elected to field.
- Nduduzo Mfoza (KwaZulu-Natal Inland) made his List A debut.

=== December 2017 ===
3 December 2017
Scorecard

Northern Cape (South Africa); 243 (48 overs)	v	(South Africa) Border; 247/7 (48.5 overs)
Werner Coetsee 82 (90); Clayton Bosch 2/35 (9 overs)		Marco Marais 122 (87); Reece Williams 3/52 (9.5 overs)

Border won by 3 wickets
Diamond Oval, Kimberley
Umpires: Rudi Birkenstock and Kevin Lawrence

- Northern Cape won the toss and elected to bat.
- Themba Maupa (Northern Cape) made his List A debut.

3 December 2017
Scorecard

Western Province (South Africa); 160 (41.4 overs)	v	(South Africa) Eastern Province; 161/3 (43.4 overs)
Matthew Kleinveldt 49 (86); Brad Dolley 4/21 (8.4 overs)		Mathew Christensen 56* (65); Dayyaan Galiem 2/29 (5 overs)

Eastern Province won by 7 wickets
Pollock Field, Port Elizabeth
Umpires: Thomas Mokorosi and Laurance Willemse

- Eastern Province won the toss and elected to field.
- Myolisi Fumba and Emanuel Sererami (Western Province) both made their List A debuts.

3 December 2017
Scorecard

South Western Districts (South Africa); 224 (45.1 overs)	v	(South Africa) KwaZulu-Natal; 227/5 (38.3 overs)
Hanno Kotze 73 (83); Senuran Muthusamy 4/42 (9 overs)		Khalipha Cele 70 (76); Glenton Stuurman 3/42 (10 overs)

KwaZulu-Natal won by 5 wickets
Chatsworth Stadium, Durban
Umpires: Stephen Rex and Abdoellah Steenkamp

- South Western Districts won the toss and elected to bat.

3 December 2017
Scorecard

Gauteng (South Africa); 295/6 (50 overs)	v	(South Africa) Free State; 260 (49.3 overs)
Stephen Cook 101 (128); Tshepo Ntuli 2/37 (10 overs)		Diego Rosier 60 (70); Nono Pongolo 2/16 (6 overs)

Gauteng won by 35 runs
Wanderers Cricket Club, Johannesburg
Umpires: Gladman Gaseba and Marlon Jansen

- Free State won the toss and elected to field.
- Janko Dreyer (Free State) made his List A debut.

9 December 2017
Scorecard

Boland (South Africa); 232/6 (50 overs)	v	(South Africa) Border; 236/7 (44.1 overs)
David Bedingham 104* (130); Ayabulela Gqamane 3/54 (9 overs)		Clayton Bosch 72* (80); Ziyaad Abrahams 2/34 (6 overs)

Border won by 3 wickets
Buffalo Park, East London
Umpires: Clifford Isaacs and Abdoellah Steenkamp

- Boland won the toss and elected to bat.
- Bongolwethu Makeleni (Border) made his List A debut.

10 December 2017
Scorecard

KwaZulu-Natal Inland (South Africa); 184 (45 overs)	v	(South Africa) North West; 187/5 (47.1 overs)
Gareth Dukes 49 (47); Brady Barends 4/46 (9 overs)		Richardt Frenz 65* (106); Kyle Nipper 2/22 (10 overs)

North West won by 5 wickets
City Oval, Pietermaritzburg
Umpires: Murray Brown and Lester Leendertz

- KwaZulu-Natal Inland won the toss and elected to bat.

16 December 2017
Scorecard

Easterns (South Africa); 184/9 (50 overs)	v	(South Africa) Eastern Province; 59 (17.2 overs)
Matthew Arnold 57 (78); Basheeru-Deen Walters 2/7 (4.3 overs)		Edward Moore 23 (21); Matthew Arnold 4/1 (3 overs)

Easterns won by 125 runs
Willowmoore Park, Benoni
Umpires: Johan Cloete and Lubabalo Gcuma

- Eastern Province won the toss and elected to field.

17 December 2017
Scorecard

Northern Cape (South Africa)	v	(South Africa) Northerns

Match abandoned
Diamond Oval, Kimberley
Umpires: Siphelele Gasa and Marlon Jansen
Player of the match: No play was possible due to rain.

- No toss.

17 December 2017
Scorecard

KwaZulu-Natal (South Africa); 316/7 (50 overs)	v	(South Africa) Western Province; 296/9 (50 overs)
Calvin Savage 108 (83); Jason Smith 3/50 (10 overs)		Pieter Malan 92 (115); Senuran Muthusamy 4/56 (8 overs)

KwaZulu-Natal won by 20 runs
Western Province Cricket Club, Cape Town
Umpires: Murray Brown and Clifford Isaacs

- Western Province won the toss and elected to field.

17 December 2017
Scorecard

KwaZulu-Natal Inland (South Africa); 250/8 (50 overs)	v	(South Africa) Gauteng; 221/3 (43 overs)
Luke Schlemmer 110 (152); Chad Classen 2/40 (8 overs)		Ryan Rickelton 84 (91); Nduduzo Mfoza 1/38 (7 overs)

Gauteng won by 30 runs (D/L method)
City Oval, Pietermaritzburg
Umpires: Arno Jacobs and Abdoellah Steenkamp

- KwaZulu-Natal Inland won the toss and elected to bat.
- Joel Veeran (KwaZulu-Natal Inland) made his List A debut.

17 December 2017
Scorecard

Boland (South Africa); 214 (41 overs)	v	(South Africa) Free State; 215/2 (34 overs)
Niel Botha 61* (39); Nealan van Heerden 4/42 (8 overs)		Andries Gous 109* (87); Brandon Glover 1/30 (4 overs)

Free State won by 8 wickets
Mangaung Oval, Bloemfontein
Umpires: Thomas Mokorosi and Dennis Smith

- Free State won the toss and elected to field.

=== January 2018 ===
7 January 2018
Scorecard

North West (South Africa); 257/6 (50 overs)	v	(South Africa) South Western Districts; 258/2 (45.2 overs)
Andre Malan 100* (90); Glenton Stuurman 2/34 (10 overs)		Niel Hornbuckle 153* (152); Johannes Diseko 1/45 (10 overs)

South Western Districts won by 8 wickets
Recreation Ground, Oudtshoorn
Umpires: Stephen Rex and Jurie Sadler

- North West won the toss and elected to bat.

7 January 2018
Scorecard

Northerns (South Africa); 285/9 (50 overs)	v	(South Africa) KwaZulu-Natal; 272 (48.3 overs)
Thomas Kaber 76 (70); Eathan Bosch 2/41 (8 overs)		Marques Ackerman 81 (66); Gregory Mahlokwana 4/32 (8.3 overs)

Northerns won by 13 runs
Kingsmead Cricket Ground, Durban
Umpires: Kevin Lawrence and Bongani Ntshebe

- Northerns won the toss and elected to bat.
- Tumi Koto, Mitchell Van Buuren and Corbin Bosch (Northerns) all made their List A debuts.

7 January 2018
Scorecard

Eastern Province (South Africa); 186 (49.4 overs)	v	(South Africa) KwaZulu-Natal Inland; 187/6 (42.5 overs)
Onke Nyaku 54 (80); Kerwin Mungroo 3/29 (9 overs)		Lefa Mosena 65 (88); Edward Moore 2/31 (7.5 overs)

KwaZulu-Natal Inland won by 4 wickets
City Oval, Pietermaritzburg
Umpires: Gladman Gaseba and Laurance Willemse

- Eastern Province won the toss and elected to bat.

7 January 2018
Scorecard

Easterns (South Africa); 204 (40.2 overs)	v	(South Africa) Free State; 208/7 (44.2 overs)
Wesley Marshall 69 (65); Corné Dry 4/36 (7.2 overs)		Patrick Botha 97 (93); Ryan Cartwright 3/32 (10 overs)

Free State won by 3 wickets
Mangaung Oval, Bloemfontein
Umpires: Marlon Jansen and Jack Morton

- Easterns won the toss and elected to bat.

14 January 2018
Scorecard

Boland (South Africa); 158 (44.4 overs)	v	(South Africa) KwaZulu-Natal Inland; 159/2 (30.2 overs)
Simon Khomari 45 (81); Kurtlyn Mannikam 3/15 (6 overs)		Luke Schlemmer 76* (96); Niel Botha 1/24 (6 overs)

KwaZulu-Natal Inland won by 8 wickets
Boland Park, Paarl
Umpires: Ryan Hendricks and Abdoellah Steenkamp

- KwaZulu-Natal Inland won the toss and elected to field.
- Fritz de Beer (Boland) made his List A debut.

14 January 2018
Scorecard

Namibia; 288/7 (50 overs)	v	(South Africa) Eastern Province; 268 (47.3 overs)
Jan Frylinck 111* (78); Luvuyo Adam 3/52 (10 overs)		Edward Moore 68 (68); Craig Williams 4/43 (8.3 overs)

Namibia won by 20 runs
St George's Park, Port Elizabeth

- Eastern Province won the toss and elected to field.

14 January 2018
Scorecard

Northern Cape (South Africa); 209 (49.2 overs)	v	(South Africa) Western Province; 210/7 (49.2 overs)
Giovanni Joseph 42 (73); Dayyaan Galiem 3/22 (6.2 overs)		Zubayr Hamza 67 (96); Kagiso Mohale 2/32 (7.2 overs)

Western Province won by 3 wickets
Diamond Oval, Kimberley
Umpires: Siphelele Gasa and Marlon Jansen

- Northern Cape won the toss and elected to bat.
- Mathew Goles and Bonga Makaka (Western Province) both made their List A debuts.

14 January 2018
Scorecard

South Western Districts (South Africa); 220/9 (50 overs)	v	(South Africa) Free State; 205 (44.5 overs)
Hanno Kotze 74 (80); Diego Rosier 4/25 (6 overs)		Diego Rosier 88 (90); Marcello Piedt 5/35 (9.5 overs)

South Western Districts won by 15 runs
Recreation Ground, Oudtshoorn
Umpires: Murray Brown and Stephen Rex

- South Western Districts won the toss and elected to bat.

21 January 2018
Scorecard

Northerns (South Africa); 236 (50 overs)	v	(South Africa) Western Province; 118 (32.4 overs)
Stefan Klopper 49 (62); Justin Dill 2/25 (10 overs)		Qaasim Adams 30 (44); Eldred Hawken 3/21 (8 overs)

Northerns won by 118 runs
Western Province Cricket Club, Cape Town
Umpires: Murray Brown and Jurie Sadler

- Northerns won the toss and elected to bat.
- Michael Cohen (Western Province) and Dalen Mmako (Northerns) both made their List A debuts.

21 January 2018
Scorecard

Border (South Africa); 284/7 (50 overs)	v	Namibia; 285/7 (48.2 overs)
Sinethemba Qeshile 67 (72); JJ Smit 2/63 (10 overs)		Jan Frylinck 126* (105); Jerry Nqolo 2/50 (10 overs)

Namibia won by 3 wickets
Buffalo Park, East London
Umpires: Hassen Dawood and Arno Jacobs

- Namibia won the toss and elected to field.
- Sinethemba Qeshile and Bamanye Xengxe (Border) both made their List A debuts.

21 January 2018
Scorecard

Gauteng (South Africa); 273/7 (50 overs)	v	(South Africa) Boland; 266 (49.4 overs)
Shaylen Pillay 63 (82); Ziyaad Abrahams 2/30 (9 overs)		Darryl Hendricks 94 (108); Nono Pongolo 5/29 (9.4 overs)

Gauteng won by 7 runs
New Wanderers Stadium, Johannesburg
Umpires: Rudi Birkenstock and Lubabalo Gcuma

- Gauteng won the toss and elected to bat.

28 January 2018
Scorecard

Northern Cape (South Africa)	v	(South Africa) South Western Districts

Match abandoned
Diamond Oval, Kimberley
Umpires: Ryan Hendricks and Stephen Rex

- No toss.

=== February 2018 ===
4 February 2018
Scorecard

KwaZulu-Natal Inland (South Africa); 249/7 (50 overs)	v	(South Africa) Border; 172 (39.1 overs)
Kyle Nipper 108 (98); Sithembile Langa 3/70 (10 overs)		Kabelo Sekhukhune 44 (63); Gareth Dukes 3/20 (6.1 overs)

KwaZulu-Natal Inland won by 77 runs
City Oval, Pietermaritzburg
Umpires: Gladman Gaseba and Jurie Sadler

- Border won the toss and elected to field.

4 February 2018
Scorecard

South Western Districts (South Africa); 214 (44.4 overs)	v	Namibia; 216/3 (35.5 overs)
Letlotlo Sesele 76 (61); JJ Smit 3/29 (9.4 overs)		Craig Williams 52* (49); Bradley de Villiers 2/58 (9.5 overs)

Namibia won by 7 wickets
Wanderers Cricket Ground, Windhoek
Umpires: Marlon Jansen and Claude Thorburn

- Namibia won the toss and elected to field.
- Bradley de Villiers (South Western Districts) made his List A debut.

11 February 2018
Scorecard

Western Province (South Africa); 144 (45.3 overs)	v	(South Africa) Gauteng; 146/0 (26.4 overs)
Jack Newby 63 (146); Masilo Ramothata 4/26 (10 overs)		Muhammed Mayet 80* (77)

Gauteng won by 10 wickets
Western Province Cricket Club, Cape Town
Umpires: Rudi Birkenstock and Thomas Mokorosi

- Western Province won the toss and elected to bat.
- Jack Newby and Zac Elkin (Western Province) both made their List A debuts.

11 February 2018
Scorecard

Easterns (South Africa); 216 (49 overs)	v	(South Africa) Boland; 215 (49.1 overs)
Sizwe Masondo 63 (107); Ziyaad Abrahams 4/32 (8 overs)		Ferisco Adams 66 (71); Kofi Apea-Adu 3/30 (9.1 overs)

Easterns won by 1 run
Boland Park, Paarl
Umpires: Clifford Isaacs and Marlon Jansen

- Boland won the toss and elected to field.
- Katleho Bala and Lance Humphrey (Easterns) both made their List A debuts.

11 February 2018
Scorecard

Namibia; 111 (31.5 overs)	v	(South Africa) KwaZulu-Natal; 114/6 (28.4 overs)
Gerrie Snyman 26 (47); Prenelan Subrayen 3/14 (7 overs)		Calvin Savage 33* (43); Danie van Schoor 3/12 (7 overs)

KwaZulu-Natal won by 4 wickets (D/L method)
Kingsmead Cricket Ground, Durban
Umpires: Murray Brown and Bongani Ntshebe

- KwaZulu-Natal won the toss and elected to field.
- Nicol Loftie-Eaton, Lauritz Haccou and Ben Shikongo (Namibia) all made their List A debuts.

18 February 2018
Scorecard

KwaZulu-Natal Inland (South Africa); 214 (45.3 overs)	v	Namibia; 183/4 (35.4 overs)
Gareth Dukes 44 (56); Christopher Coombe 4/37 (6 overs)		Janneman Malan 66* (103); Thomas Kaber 3/49 (10 overs)

KwaZulu-Natal Inland won by 123 runs
City Oval, Pietermaritzburg
Umpires: Rudi Birkenstock and Arno Jacobs

- Namibia won the toss and elected to field.

18 February 2018
Scorecard

Northerns (South Africa); 180 (46.2 overs)	v	(South Africa) North West; 183/4 (35.4 overs)
Gregory Mahlokwana 30 (43); Ayavuya Myoli 3/15 (5.2 overs)		Janneman Malan 66* (103); Thomas Kaber 3/49 (10 overs)

North West won by 6 wickets
Centurion Park, Centurion
Umpires: Marlon Jansen and Stephen Rex

- Northerns won the toss and elected to bat.

18 February 2018
Scorecard

Border (South Africa); 148 (44.2 overs)	v	(South Africa) South Western Districts; 151/4 (37.1 overs)
Mkhululi Calana 51 (115); Obus Pienaar 3/12 (6 overs)		Jean du Plessis 43 (72); Phaphama Fojela 1/16 (5 overs)

South Western Districts won by 6 wickets
Recreation Ground, Oudtshoorn
Umpires: Jurie Sadler and Abdoellah Steenkamp

- Border won the toss and elected to bat.

25 February 2018
Scorecard

Eastern Province (South Africa); 170 (44.4 overs)	v	(South Africa) Gauteng; 171/2 (35.2 overs)
Edward Moore 43 (102); Nandre Burger 3/41 (9.4 overs)		Muhammed Mayet 48 (56); Kelly Smuts 1/21 (6 overs)

Gauteng won by 8 wickets
St George's Park, Port Elizabeth
Umpires: Abdoellah Steenkamp and Murray Brown

- Gauteng won the toss and elected to field.

25 February 2018
Scorecard

Boland (South Africa); 210 (49.3 overs)	v	(South Africa) KwaZulu-Natal; 214/6 (44.4 overs)
David Bedingham 101 (111); Prenelan Subrayen 3/23 (10 overs)		Calvin Savage 70 (95); Ziyaad Abrahams 3/38 (10 overs)

KwaZulu-Natal won by 4 wickets
Boland Park, Paarl
Umpires: Clifford Isaacs and Dennis Smith

- Boland won the toss and elected to bat.

25 February 2018
Scorecard

Free State (South Africa); 222/6 (50 overs)	v	Namibia; 224/7 (49.1 overs)
Andries Gous 44 (77); Jan Frylinck 2/36 (8 overs)		Stephan Baard 112 (148); Corné Dry 3/36 (10 overs)

Namibia won by 3 wickets
Wanderers Cricket Ground, Windhoek
Umpires: Marthinus Louw and Arno Jacobs

- Free State won the toss and elected to bat.
- Dilivio Ridgaard (Free State) made his List A debut.

25 February 2018
Scorecard

Easterns (South Africa); 328/7 (50 overs)	v	(South Africa) North West; 321/9 (50 overs)
Jurie Snyman 136 (120); Dyllan Matthews 3/76 (10 overs)		Richardt Frenz 108 (99); Armandt Erasmus 5/75 (10 overs)

Easterns won by 7 runs
Senwes Park, Potchefstroom
Umpires: Ryan Hendricks and Kevin Lawrence

- North West won the toss and elected to field.

=== March 2018 ===
4 March 2018
Scorecard

Free State (South Africa); 277 (47.5 overs)	v	(South Africa) Northern Cape; 74 (18.5 overs)
Beyers Swanepoel 60* (42); Thandolwethu Mnyaka 2/29 (5 overs)		Aubrey Swanepoel 16 (15); Beyers Swanepoel 4/24 (8 overs)

Free State won by 203 runs
Mangaung Oval, Bloemfontein
Umpires: Thomas Mokorosi and Murray Brown

- Northern Cape won the toss and elected to field.

4 March 2018
Scorecard

South Western Districts (South Africa); 242/8 (50 overs)	v	(South Africa) Northerns; 140/5 (33 overs)
Obus Pienaar 75 (70); Alfred Mothoa 3/29 (10 overs)		Rubin Hermann 49 (51); Hanno Kotze 1/13 (3 overs)

South Western Districts won by 13 runs (D/L method)
Centurion Park, Centurion
Umpires: Clifford Isaacs and Ryan Hendricks

- Northerns won the toss and elected to field.
- Wandile Makwetu and Ruan de Swardt (Northerns) both made their List A debuts.

11 March 2018
Scorecard

Eastern Province (South Africa); 148 (46.4 overs)	v	(South Africa) Boland; 150/3 (34 overs)
Onke Nyaku 32 (54); Kyle Simmonds 4/20 (10 overs)		David Bedingham 53* (59); Lutho Sipamla 1/16 (7 overs)

Boland won by 7 wickets
Boland Park, Paarl
Umpires: Murray Brown and Narendra Menon

- Eastern Province won the toss and elected to bat.
- Jade de Klerk (Eastern Province) made his List A debut.

11 March 2018
Scorecard

Northern Cape (South Africa); 226 (46.2 overs)	v	(South Africa) Easterns; 227/7 (49 overs)
Zakir Kathrada 57* (67); Imran Manack 2/36 (10 overs)		Sizwe Masondo 69 (98); Warren Bell 3/37 (10 overs)

Easterns won by 3 wickets
Willowmoore Park, Benoni
Umpires: Jurie Sadler and Hassen Dawood

- Easterns won the toss and elected to field.
- Felane Neo (Easterns) made his List A debut.

11 March 2018
Scorecard

North West (South Africa); 320/6 (50 overs)	v	(South Africa) Border; 325/6 (49.2 overs)
Richardt Frenz 89 (103); Sithembile Langa 4/69 (10 overs)		Gionne Koopman 126* (119); Craig Alexander 3/69 (9.2 overs)

Border won by 4 wickets
Senwes Park, Potchefstroom
Umpires: Arno Jacobs and Lubabalo Gcuma

- Border won the toss and elected to field.
- Yamkela Oliphant (Border) made his List A debut.

11 March 2018
Scorecard

Gauteng (South Africa)	v	(South Africa) Northerns

Match abandoned
University of the Witwatersrand, Johannesburg
Umpires: Phillip Vosloo and Abdoellah Steenkamp

- No toss.
- No play was possible due to rain.

18 March 2018
Scorecard

Free State (South Africa); 254/8 (50 overs)	v	(South Africa) KwaZulu-Natal Inland; 258/7 (48.3 overs)
Patrick Botha 101 (102); Kurtlyn Mannikam 3/31 (7 overs)		Ruhan Pretorius 98 (101); Eddie Leie 2/37 (8 overs)

KwaZulu-Natal Inland won by 3 wickets
Mangaung Oval, Bloemfontein
Umpires: Clifford Isaacs and Thomas Mokorosi

- Free State won the toss and elected to bat.

18 March 2018
Scorecard

Western Province (South Africa); 250/6 (50 overs)	v	(South Africa) South Western Districts; 233 (44 overs)
Jason Smith 77 (82); Glenton Stuurman 2/31 (50 overs)		Letlotlo Sesele 52 (47); Matthew Kleinveldt 3/16 (4 overs)

Western Province won by 17 runs
Western Province Cricket Club, Cape Town
Umpires: Siphelele Gasa and Ryan Hendricks

- Western Province won the toss and elected to bat.

25 March 2018
Scorecard

Northerns (South Africa); 263/5 (50 overs)	v	(South Africa) Boland; 249/8 (50 overs)
Tony de Zorzi 74 (103); Kyle Simmonds 2/28 (10 overs)		Simon Khomari 100 (135); Luvuyo Nkese 4/35 (10 overs)

Northerns won by 14 runs
Boland Park, Paarl
Umpires: Lubabalo Gcuma and Johan Cloete

- Northerns won the toss and elected to bat.
- Neil Brand (Northerns) made his List A debut.

25 March 2018
Scorecard

KwaZulu-Natal (South Africa); 183 (46.3 overs)	v	(South Africa) Border; 184/3 (39.5 overs)
Marques Ackerman 59 (72); Jason Niemand 6/31 (7.3 overs)		Gionne Koopman 66 (80); Smangaliso Nhlebela 1/27 (5 overs)

Border won by 7 wickets
Buffalo Park, East London
Umpires: Philip Vosloo and Thomas Mokorosi

- KwaZulu-Natal won the toss and elected to bat.
- Malwande Zamo and Bradley Mauer (Border) both made their List A debuts.

25 March 2018
Scorecard

Free State (South Africa)	v	(South Africa) Western Province

Match abandoned
Mangaung Oval, Bloemfontein

- No toss.

25 March 2018
Scorecard

KwaZulu-Natal Inland (South Africa); 196 (49.3 overs)	v	(South Africa) Easterns; 197/4 (35.3 overs)
Sohail Mahmoud 44 (72); Ernest Kemm 4/34 (10 overs)		Jurie Snyman 126 (111); Kyle Nipper 1/20 (7 overs)

Easterns won by 6 wickets
Willowmoore Park, Benoni
Umpires: Brad White and Arno Jacobs

- KwaZulu-Natal Inland won the toss and elected to bat.

== Final ==
8 April 2018
Scorecard

North West (South Africa); 179 (49.2 overs)	v	(South Africa) Gauteng; 145 (41.3 overs)
Janneman Malan 69 (99); Kgaudisa Molefe 3/35 (10 overs)		Ndumiso Mvelase 39 (37); Wihan Lubbe 3/21 (8 overs)

North West won by 34 runs
Wanderers Stadium, Johannesburg
Umpires: Marlon Jansen and Jurie Sadler

- North West won the toss and elected to bat.
- Marco Jansen (North West) made his List A debut.
