= List of KwaZulu-Natal Inland representative cricketers =

This is a list of cricketers who have played first-class, List A cricket, or Twenty20 cricket for the KwaZulu-Natal Inland cricket team in South Africa.

The areas of KwaZulu-Natal that KwaZulu-Natal Inland represents has traditionally been part of the KwaZulu-Natal cricket team catchment. (Note: KwaZulu-Natal was known as Natal until 1994. The team was also known as Natal until 1998.) KwaZulu-Natal Inland played its first matches in 2001 and was awarded first-class cricket status ahead of the 2006–07 cricket season, during which it played in the Provincial Three-Day Challenge first-class competition and One-Day Cup. (Note: South Western Districts, Kei, Limpopo, and Mpumalanga were all promoted to first-class status at the same time. Only KwaZulu-Natal Inland and South Western Districts continued as senior teams after their first season, although Limpopo and Mpumalanga regained first-class status in 2022–23.) It became part of the Dolphins franchise which had originally been operated solely by KwaZulu-Natal. (Note: The period of franchise cricket in South Africa lasted from 2003–04 until 2020–21.)

The team has played first-class and List A cricket since 2006–07, and Twenty20 cricket since the establishment of provincial Twenty20 competitions in 2011–12. This list includes the players who played first-class, List A and Twenty20 cricket for KwaZulu-Natal Inland.

As of 15 July 2025

== A ==
- Kyle Abbott
- Yusuf Abdulla
- Ziyaad Abrahams
- Glen Addicott
- Craig Alexander
- Deepak Anand
- Paul Atkins

== B ==
- Brady Barends
- Chad Barron
- Nabeel Bhayla
- Michael Booth
- Clint Bowyer
- Lyndon Brown
- Sam Brown
- Mbulelo Budaza
- Shane Burger

== C ==
- Robin Cheesman
- Cody Chetty
- Kemeshin Chetty
- Tafadzwa Chihota
- Ben Compton
- Devon Conway
- Ruan Cronje

== D ==
- Cameron Delport
- Tshepang Dithole
- Sashen Dorasamy
- Timothy Drummond
- Sivuyile Duda
- Keith Dudgeon
- Gareth Dukes
- Daryn Dupavillon

== E ==
- Michael Erlank
- Sarel Erwee

== F ==
- Robert Frylinck
- Daelen Fynn

== G ==
- Jayden Gengan
- Sean Gilson
- Brendan Govender
- Mbasa Gqadushe

== H ==
- Garry Hampson
- Murray Hampson
- Narvaar Harridave
- Nic Hendrie
- Kyle Heyns
- Rudy Hillermann
- Sandile Hlatshwayo
- Richard Hlela
- Matt Hulett
- Graham Hume
- Oliver Humphries

== K ==
- Imraan Khan
- Mondli Khumalo
- Thamsanqa Khumalo
- Kushen Kishun
- Tian Koekemoer
- Tyron Koen

== L ==
- Chad Laycock
- Jack Lees
- Tyler Lortan
- Matthew Luksich
- Lwando Lwana

== M ==
- Ross McMillan
- Sanvir Maharaj
- Xolani Mahlaba
- Sohail Mahmoud
- Zedan Mahomed
- Allister Majola
- Kurtlyn Mannikam
- Attie Maposa
- Shaun Marais
- Michael Matika
- Dyllan Matthews
- Jomu Mbili
- Jared Meiring
- Nduduzo Mfoza
- Alindile Mhletywa
- Sinethemba Mjekula
- Emmanuel Mkhize
- Andile Mogakane
- Darryn Mortimer
- Mangaliso Mosehle
- Lefa Mosena
- Brad Moses
- Sibonelo Mthimkhulu
- Kerwin Mungroo
- Clement Mvovo
- Stephan Myburgh

== N ==
- Thabiso Ndlela
- Lepono Ndhlovu
- Anderson Ndovela
- Mpho Ndumo
- Thula Ngcobo
- Cheslin Nhlapo
- Smangaliso Nhlebela
- Kyle Nipper
- Malcolm Nofal
- Lifa Ntanzi
- Thando Ntini

== O ==
- Mario Olivier

== P ==
- Kivershan Padayachee
- Zakariya Paruk
- Gerry Penford
- Jarryd Phillips
- Marcello Piedt
- Mat Pillans
- Caleb Pillay
- Ruhan Pretorius

== Q ==
- Qasim Khurshid

== R ==
- Waseem Rahman
- Rowan Rajah
- Kagiso Rapulana
- Suhail Razack
- Abdul Razak
- Dilivio Ridgard
- Johnny Riekert
- James Ritchie
- Grant Roelofsen
- Grant Rowley
- Devon Ryland

== S ==
- Mario Saliwa
- Calvin Savage
- Luke Schlemmer
- Michael Sclanders
- Tabraiz Shamsi
- Cameron Shekleton
- Andile Simelane
- Kyle Simmonds
- Johann Smit
- Faheem Suleman

== T ==
- Stefan Tait
- Scott Tarr
- Ruben Trumpelmann
- Andrew Tweedie

== V ==
- Yaseen Valli
- Pite van Biljon
- Jonathan Vandiar
- Josh van Eeden
- Jared van Heerden
- Vaughn van Jaarsveld
- Slade van Staden
- Andre van Vuuren
- Morné van Vuuren
- Divan van Wyk
- Morné van Wyk
- Joel Veeran
- Dane Vilas

== W ==
- Doug Watson
- Sean Whitehead
- Stuart Woodroffe

== X ==
- Mpumelelo Xulu

== Z ==
- Dudu Zondo
- Khaya Zondo
- Lwandiswa Zuma
- Ntando Zuma
- Sthabiso Zungu
