= List of Knights cricketers =

This is a list of cricketers who played for the South African franchise Knights cricket team between the 2003–04 season and 2020–21. It includes the players who appeared for the team in first-class, List A and Twenty20 competitions during the period in which the team was a franchise. The team was formed with the name Eagles, which it used until the end of the 2010–11 season.

During 2003, Cricket South Africa changed the way in which top-class domestic cricket in the country was organised. This created six franchise teams at the top level of domestic competition, combining the existing provincial teams to create an elite competition. During negotiations, five of the six franchises were created without significant problems, (Note: Eastern Province and Border, the teams which formed the Warriors franchise, needed mediation from Cricket South Africa to finalise the arrangements to create the franchise.) leaving two Cricket Unions, Free State and Griqualand West. (Note: The two teams are around 150 kilometres (93 mi) from each other, with Free State based at Bloemfontein in Free State province, and Griqualand West at Kimberley in what had been Cape Province before the Northern Cape province had been created in 1994. They were the only two teams from different provinces to merge. Kimberley is almost 1,000 kilometres (620 mi) from Cape Town where Cape Cobras were formed by Western Province and Boland.) The two were unable to agree on terms, and Cricket South Africa awarded the franchise to Free State, with the suggestion that Griqualand West take up a 45% share. Griqualand West refused initially to join the franchise, leaving Free State as the sole provincial union for the first full season of franchise cricket in 2004–05. The team joined the franchise during the 2005 winter.

The franchise, known initially as Eagles, competed in the 2003–04 CSA T20 Challenge, before the CSA 4-Day Domestic Series and CSA One-Day Cup also became franchise-only competitions the following season.

During the period of franchise competitions, Free State and Griqualand West continued to compete as separate cricket unions in the CSA 3-Day and One-Day Cups and CSA T20 competitions. Griqualand West were renamed as Northern Cape following the end of the 2014–15 season. The period of franchise competition lasted until the end of the 2020–21 season when Cricket South Africa reverted to a division based provincial competition, with both teams competing separately from the start of the 2021–22 season. Many of the senior provincial unions which had been involved in franchise competitions retained the names of their franchises as marketing tools. Free State, the senior team in the Knights franchise, chose to do so and compete using the name Knights.

This list includes only the players who played for the Knights franchise between 2003–04 and 2020–21, the period in which franchise cricket operated in South Africa. It includes the players who appeared for the franchise when it was known as Eagles between 2003–04 and 2009–10. It does not include players who appeared only for Free State, Griqualand West or Northern Cape in provincial competitions during that period, or those who played for Free State after the end of franchise competitions in 2020–21.

== A ==
- Gerhardt Abrahams
- Luvuyo Adam
- Ferisco Adams
- Muhammad Akoojee
- Nathan Arthur

== B ==
- Ottniel Baartman
- Ryan Bailey (cricketer)
- Farhaan Behardien
- Jonathan Beukes
- Tumelo Bodibe
- Nicky Boje
- Loots Bosman
- Wendell Bossenger
- Patrick Botha
- Mbulelo Budaza

== C ==
- Deon Carolus
- Werner Coetsee
- Gerald Coetzee
- Jandre Coetzee

== D ==
- Cliff Deacon
- Theunis de Bruyn
- Riel de Kock
- Con de Lange
- Marchant de Lange
- CJ de Villiers
- Boeta Dippenaar
- Johannes Diseko
- Allan Donald
- Corné Dry
- Leus du Plooy
- Dillon du Preez

== E ==
- Dean Elgar
- Michael Erlank

== F ==
- Clyde Fortuin
- Quinton Friend

== G ==
- Andries Gous

== H ==
- Benjamin Hector
- James Henderson
- Reeza Hendricks

== J ==
- Davy Jacobs
- Duan Jansen
- Marco Jansen

== K ==
- Matthew Kleinveldt
- Pieter Koortzen
- Brent Kops
- Alan Kruger
- Patrick Kruger
- Deon Kruis
- Akhona Kula

== L ==
- Eddie Leie
- Gerhardus Liebenberg
- Johann Louw

== M ==
- Adrian McLaren
- Ryan McLaren
- Wandile Makwetu
- Jacob Malao
- Tumi Masekela
- Mandla Mashimbyi
- David Miller (South African cricketer)
- Thandolwethu Mnyaka
- Luthando Mnyanda
- Reggie Modise
- Sammy Mofokeng
- Kagisho Mohale
- Grant Mokoena
- Bokang Mosena
- Lefa Mosena
- Alfred Mothoa
- Victor Mpitsang

== N ==
- Tshepo Ntuli

== O ==
- Duanne Olivier

== P ==
- Keegan Petersen
- Robin Peterson
- Obus Pienaar
- Charl Pietersen
- Migael Pretorius

== Q ==
- Zakhele Qwabe

== R ==
- Andrew Rasemene
- Diego Rosier
- Rilee Rossouw
- Jacques Rudolph
- Andre Russell

== S ==
- Mario Saliwa
- Rudi Second
- Letlotlo Sesele
- Malusi Siboto
- Jacques Snyman
- Aubrey Swanepoel
- Beyers Swanepoel

== T ==
- Roger Telemachus
- Romano Terblanche
- Craig Thyssen
- JP Triegaardt
- Thandi Tshabalala

== V ==
- Pite van Biljon
- Johan van der Wath
- Jonathan Vandiar
- Shadley van Schalkwyk
- Raynard van Tonder
- Divan van Wyk
- Jandre van Wyk
- Morné van Wyk
- Willem van Zyl
- Shaun von Berg
- Gino Vries

== Z ==
- Lwandiswa Zuma
