= Kevin Lawrence =

Kevin Lawrence may refer to:

- Kevin Lawrence (umpire)
- Kevin Lawrence (violinist)
