= Michael Cohen (cricketer) =

French-South African cricketer (born 1998)

Personal information
- Full name: Michael Alex Robert Cohen
- Born: 4 August 1998 (age 28); Cape Town, South Africa
- Batting: Left-handed
- Bowling: Left-arm fast-medium

Domestic team information
- Years: Team
- 2016/17–2018/19: Western Province
- 2017/18: Cape Cobras
- 2020–2021: Derbyshire (squad no. 8)
- 2025–2026: Kent (squad no. 45)
- FC debut: 2 March 2017 Western Province v Border
- LA debut: 21 January 2018 Western Province v Northerns

Career statistics
Competition	FC	LA	T20
Matches	27	10	12
Runs scored	218	25	22
Batting average	12.11	12.50	22.00
100s/50s	0/0	0/0	0/0
Top score	30*	16	7*
Balls bowled	3,488	486	202
Wickets	74	10	9
Bowling average	30.37	49.20	32.11
5 wickets in innings	3	0	0
10 wickets in match	0	0	0
Best bowling	5/40	4/65	2/17
Catches/stumpings	3/–	2/–	0/–
- Source: Cricinfo, 27 September 2026

Michael Alex Robert Cohen (born 4 August 1998) is a South African-born French cricketer who has played for Derbyshire and Kent.

== Early life ==
Cohen was born on 4 August 1998 in Cape Town, South Africa. He is of French descent and holds a French passport.

== Career ==
He made his first-class debut for Western Province in the 2016–17 Sunfoil 3-Day Cup on 2 March 2017. He made his Twenty20 debut for Western Province in the 2017 Africa T20 Cup on 25 August 2017. He made his List A debut for Western Province in the 2017–18 CSA Provincial One-Day Challenge on 21 January 2018.

He was the leading wicket-taker in the 2017–18 Sunfoil 3-Day Cup for Western Province, with 26 dismissals in six matches. In September 2018, he was named in Western Province's squad for the 2018 Africa T20 Cup.

In October 2019, he was signed by Derbyshire County Cricket Club in England on a two-year deal. Cohen is not considered as an overseas player, as he qualifies for EU citizenship. He was released by Derbyshire at the end of the 2022 season.

In November 2023, he signed a two-year contract with Kent. Cohen agreed a further one-year deal with the club in January 2026. On 28 September 2026, it was announced that he would leave Kent at the end of his contract.
