= Luvuyo Nkese =

South African cricketer (born 1997)

Personal information
- Born: 6 May 1997 (age 29)
- Source: Cricinfo, 1 September 2017

Luvuyo Nkese (born 6 May 1997) is a South African cricketer. He made his Twenty20 debut for Northerns in the 2017 Africa T20 Cup on 1 September 2017. He made his first-class debut for Northerns in the 2017–18 Sunfoil 3-Day Cup on 12 October 2017. He made his List A debut for Northerns in the 2017–18 CSA Provincial One-Day Challenge on 15 October 2017.

He was the leading wicket-taker in the 2017–18 CSA Provincial One-Day Challenge tournament for Northerns, with eleven dismissals in eight matches.

In September 2018, he was named in Northerns' squad for the 2018 Africa T20 Cup.
