= Janko Dreyer =

South African cricketer (born 1994)

Personal information
- Born: 14 March 1994 (age 32)
- Source: Cricinfo, 30 November 2017

Janko Dreyer (born 14 March 1994) is a South African cricketer. He made his first-class debut for Free State in the 2017–18 Sunfoil 3-Day Cup on 30 November 2017. He made his List A debut for Free State in the 2017–18 CSA Provincial One-Day Challenge on 3 December 2017.
