= Zac Elkin =

South African cricketer (born 1991)

Zac Elkin (born 21 June 1991 in Cape Town) is a South African cricketer, who played four games of first-class cricket for Cardiff MCCU. He won a gold medal with Team South Africa at the 2017 Maccabiah Games.

He made his List A debut for Western Province in the 2017–18 CSA Provincial One-Day Challenge on 11 February 2018.
