= Malwande Zamo =

South African cricketer (born 1997)

Personal information
- Born: 9 January 1997 (age 29)
- Source: Cricinfo, 23 March 2018

Malwande Zamo (born 9 January 1997) is a South African cricketer. He made his first-class debut for Border in the 2017–18 Sunfoil 3-Day Cup on 22 March 2018. He made his List A debut for Border in the 2017–18 CSA Provincial One-Day Challenge on 25 March 2018.
