= Zwelo Ntsimbini =

South African cricketer (born 1992)

Personal information
- Born: 29 July 1992 (age 34)
- Source: Cricinfo, 22 October 2017

Zwelo Ntsimbini (born 29 July 1992) is a South African cricketer. He made his List A debut for Easterns in the 2017–18 CSA Provincial One-Day Challenge on 22 October 2017. He made his first-class debut for Easterns in the 2017–18 Sunfoil 3-Day Cup on 26 October 2017.

In September 2018, he was named in Easterns' squad for the 2018 Africa T20 Cup. He made his Twenty20 debut for Easterns in the 2018 Africa T20 Cup on 15 September 2018.
