= Bongolwethu Makeleni =

South African cricketer (born 1994)

Personal information
- Born: 5 February 1994 (age 32)
- Source: Cricinfo, 7 December 2017

Bongolwethu Makeleni (born 5 February 1994) is a South African cricketer. He made his first-class debut for Border in the 2017–18 Sunfoil 3-Day Cup on 7 December 2017. He made his List A debut for Border in the 2017–18 CSA Provincial One-Day Challenge on 9 December 2017.

In August 2018, he was named in Border's squad for the 2018 Africa T20 Cup. He made his Twenty20 debut for Border in the 2018 Africa T20 Cup on 14 September 2018.
