= Joel Veeran =

South African cricketer (born 1998)

Personal information
- Born: 11 December 1998 (age 27)
- Source: Cricinfo, 9 March 2017

Joel Veeran (born 11 December 1998) is a South African cricketer. He made his first-class debut for KwaZulu-Natal in the 2016–17 Sunfoil 3-Day Cup on 9 March 2017. He made his List A debut for KwaZulu-Natal Inland in the 2017–18 CSA Provincial One-Day Challenge on 17 December 2017. He made his Twenty20 debut for KwaZulu-Natal Inland in the 2019–20 CSA Provincial T20 Cup on 13 September 2019.
