= Jandre van Wyk =

South African cricketer (born 1989)

Jandre van Wyk (born 20 March 1989) is a South African cricketer. He is a right-handed batsman and wicket-keeper who plays for Free State. He was born in Pretoria.

Van Wyk made his first-class debut as an opening batsman against Northerns in October 2008.
