= Gerry Penford =

American cricketer (born 1986)

Personal information
- Full name: Gerald W Penford
- Born: 4 September 1986 (age 40); Dallas, Texas, US
- Batting: Right-handed
- Bowling: Right-arm medium

Domestic team information
- Years: Team
- 2004/05: Manicaland
- 2007/08: KwaZulu-Natal Inland

Career statistics
Competition	First-class	List A
Matches	5	3
Runs scored	150	119
Batting average	21.42	39.66
100s/50s	0/0	1/0
Top score	36	102
Balls bowled	276	–
Wickets	9	–
Bowling average	18.22	–
5 wickets in innings	1	–
10 wickets in match	0	–
Best bowling	5/86	–
Catches/stumpings	3/–	0/–
- Source: ESPNcricinfo, 15 July 2021

Gerald W Penford (born 4 September 1986) is an American former cricketer. A right-handed batsman and a right-arm medium pace bowler, he played two first-class matches for Zimbabwe's Manicaland in 2005 and three first-class matches for South Africa's KwaZulu-Natal Inland in 2008.

Penford was born in Dallas, Texas. He currently lives in St. Petersburg, Florida, where he has owned a staffing firm named Chania Talents since 2019.
