= Marcello Piedt =

South African cricketer

Personal information
- Full name: Marcello Nicolin Piedt
- Born: 23 September 1992 (age 34); Oudtshoorn, Cape Province, South Africa
- Batting: Right-handed
- Bowling: Right-arm medium-fast
- Role: Bowler

Domestic team information
- Years: Team
- 2012/13–2018/19: South Western Districts
- 2018/19–2019/20: Titans
- 2019/20: Northerns
- 2020/21: Warriors
- 2020/21: Eastern Province
- 2021/22–2023/24: South Western Districts
- 2024: North West Warriors
- 2024/25: KwaZulu-Natal Inland
- FC debut: 18 October 2012 SW Districts v Western Province
- Only LA: 29 December 2012 SW Districts v Border

Career statistics
Competition	FC	LA	T20
Matches	82	52	24
Runs scored	1,652	459	71
Batting average	16.52	15.30	8.87
100s/50s	0/7	0/1	0/0
Top score	86	59	15*
Balls bowled	12,413	2,325	399
Wickets	236	74	17
Bowling average	27.43	24.33	30.47
5 wickets in innings	10	1	0
10 wickets in match	0	0	0
Best bowling	7/6	5/35	3/34
Catches/stumpings	38/–	17/–	3/–
- Source: CricketArchive, 15 July 2025

Marcello Nicolin Piedt (born 23 September 1992) is a South African cricketer. Piedt was called up to the SA Schools team in 2011 and has represented South Western Districts since the U13 levels. He is also a member of the Warriors Cubs franchise. He took 10–5–6–7 against Western Province on first-class debut in October 2012, and finished with 59 wickets, a record for a South African debut season. He was included in the South Western Districts cricket team squad for the 2015 Africa T20 Cup.

He was the leading wicket-taker in the 2017–18 Sunfoil 3-Day Cup for South Western Districts, with 31 dismissals in ten matches.

In September 2018, he was named in South Western Districts' squad for the 2018 Africa T20 Cup. He was the leading wicket-taker for South Western Districts in the 2018–19 CSA 3-Day Provincial Cup, with 35 dismissals in eight matches. In April 2021, he was named in South Western Districts' squad, ahead of the 2021–22 cricket season in South Africa.
