= Mpho Ndumo =

South African cricketer (born 1997)

Personal information
- Born: 15 January 1997 (age 29)
- Source: Cricinfo, 3 February 2018

Mpho Ndumo (born 15 January 1997) is a South African cricketer. He made his first-class debut for KwaZulu-Natal Inland in the 2017–18 Sunfoil 3-Day Cup on 1 February 2018. He made his List A debut on 15 March 2020, for KwaZulu-Natal Inland in the 2019–20 CSA Provincial One-Day Challenge.
