= Tyler Lortan =

South African cricketer (born 1992)

Personal information
- Born: 31 March 1992 (age 34); Durban, South Africa
- Source: Cricinfo, 17 October 2020

Tyler Lortan (born 31 March 1992) is a South African cricketer who played for KwaZulu-Natal Inland from 2011 to 2014. Lortan then moved to New Zealand, and signed with Canterbury, playing in two matches for the team in the 2018–19 Super Smash tournament.
