= Tumelo Tlhokwe =

South African cricketer (born 1994)

Personal information
- Born: 24 August 1994 (age 32)
- Source: Cricinfo, 15 October 2017

Tumelo Tlhokwe (born 24 August 1994) is a South African cricketer. He made his List A debut for Gauteng in the 2017–18 CSA Provincial One-Day Challenge on 15 October 2017. He made his first-class debut for Gauteng in the 2017–18 Sunfoil 3-Day Cup on 26 October 2017.

In September 2018, he was named in Gauteng's squad for the 2018 Africa T20 Cup. In September 2019, he was named in Gauteng's squad for the 2019–20 CSA Provincial T20 Cup.
