= Xolane Shongwe =

South African cricketer

Personal information
- Full name: Xolane Shongwe
- Source: Cricinfo, 15 October 2017

Xolane Shongwe is a South African cricketer. He made his List A debut for Easterns in the 2017–18 CSA Provincial One-Day Challenge on 15 October 2017.
