= Vezokuhle Mntungwa =

South African cricketer (born 1999)

Personal information
- Born: 18 December 1999 (age 26)
- Source: Cricinfo, 13 January 2018

Phumza Vezokuhle Mntungwa (born 18 December 1999) is a South African cricketer. He made his first-class debut for Boland in the 2017–18 Sunfoil 3-Day Cup on 11 January 2018.
