= Kevin Crowie =

South African cricketer (born 1991)

Personal information
- Born: 6 November 1991 (age 35)
- Source: Cricinfo, 10 March 2018

Kevin Crowie (born 6 November 1991) is a South African cricketer. He made his first-class debut for North West in the 2017–18 Sunfoil 3-Day Cup on 8 March 2018. In September 2018, he was named in North West's squad for the 2018 Africa T20 Cup. He made his Twenty20 debut for North West in the 2018 Africa T20 Cup on 14 September 2018. He made his List A debut on 24 November 2019, for North West in the 2019–20 CSA Provincial One-Day Challenge.
