= Nduduzo Mfoza =

South African cricketer (born 1997)

Personal information
- Born: 14 March 1997 (age 29)
- Source: Cricinfo, 15 September 2017

Nduduzo Mfoza (born 14 March 1997) is a South African cricketer. He made his Twenty20 debut for KwaZulu-Natal Inland in the 2017 Africa T20 Cup on 15 September 2017. He made his first-class debut for KwaZulu-Natal Inland in the 2017–18 Sunfoil 3-Day Cup on 23 November 2017. He made his List A debut for KwaZulu-Natal Inland in the 2017–18 CSA Provincial One-Day Challenge on 26 November 2017.

In September 2018, he was named in KwaZulu-Natal Inland's squad for the 2018 Africa T20 Cup.
