= Thomas Kaber =

South African cricketer

Personal information
- Born: 14 June 1992 (age 34); Pretoria, Transvaal Province, South Africa
- Source: Cricinfo, 15 September 2016

Thomas Kaber (born 14 June 1992) is a South African first-class cricketer. He was included in the Northerns squad for the 2016 Africa T20 Cup. He was the leading wicket-taker in the 2016–17 CSA Provincial One-Day Challenge, with a total of twenty-one dismissals in ten matches.

In August 2017, he was named in Cape Town Knight Riders' squad for the first season of the T20 Global League. However, in October 2017, Cricket South Africa initially postponed the tournament until November 2018, with it being cancelled soon after.

He was the leading run-scorer in the 2017–18 Sunfoil 3-Day Cup for Northerns, with 378 runs in eight matches. He was also the leading wicket-taker for Northerns in the tournament, with 31 dismissals in eight matches.

In September 2018, he was named in Eastern Province's squad for the 2018 Africa T20 Cup. In September 2019, he was named in Eastern Province's squad for the 2019–20 CSA Provincial T20 Cup. In April 2021, he was named in Border's squad, ahead of the 2021–22 cricket season in South Africa.
