= Mathew Goles =

South African cricketer (born 1996)

Personal information
- Born: 23 June 1996 (age 30)
- Source: Cricinfo, 13 January 2018

Mathew Goles (born 23 June 1996) is a South African cricketer. He made his first-class debut for Western Province in the 2017–18 Sunfoil 3-Day Cup on 11 January 2018. He made his List A debut for Western Province in the 2017–18 CSA Provincial One-Day Challenge on 14 January 2018.
