= Fritz de Beer =

South African cricketer (born 1996)

Personal information
- Born: 6 July 1996 (age 30)
- Source: Cricinfo, 13 January 2018

Fritz de Beer (born 6 July 1996) is a South African cricketer. He made his first-class debut for Boland in the 2017–18 Sunfoil 3-Day Cup on 11 January 2018. He made his List A debut for Boland in the 2017–18 CSA Provincial One-Day Challenge on 14 January 2018. In September 2018, he was named in Boland's squad for the 2018 Africa T20 Cup. He made his Twenty20 debut for Boland in the 2018 Africa T20 Cup on 15 September 2018. In September 2019, he was named in Boland's squad for the 2019–20 CSA Provincial T20 Cup.
