= Themba Maupa =

South African cricketer (born 1998)

Personal information
- Born: 14 August 1998 (age 28)
- Source: Cricinfo, 8 September 2017

Themba Maupa (born 14 August 1998) is a South African cricketer. He made his Twenty20 debut for Northern Cape in the 2017 Africa T20 Cup on 8 September 2017. He made his first-class debut for Northern Cape in the 2017–18 Sunfoil 3-Day Cup on 26 October 2017. He made his List A debut for Northern Cape in the 2017–18 CSA Provincial One-Day Challenge on 3 December 2017.

In September 2018, he was named in Northern Cape's squad for the 2018 Africa T20 Cup. In September 2019, he was named in Northern Cape's squad for the 2019–20 CSA Provincial T20 Cup.
