= Patrick Botha =

South African cricketer

Personal information
- Born: 23 January 1990 (age 36)
- Source: Cricinfo, 6 September 2015

Patrick Botha (born 23 January 1990) is a South African first-class cricketer. He was included in the Free State cricket team squad for the 2015 Africa T20 Cup.

He was the leading run-scorer in the 2017–18 CSA Provincial One-Day Challenge tournament for Free State, with 276 runs in nine matches. He was also the leading run-scorer in the 2017–18 Sunfoil 3-Day Cup for Free State, with 716 runs in ten matches.

In September 2018, he was named in Free State's squad for the 2018 Africa T20 Cup. He was the leading run-scorer for Free State in the 2018–19 CSA 3-Day Provincial Cup, with 544 runs in ten matches. He was the leading wicket-taker for Free State in the 2018–19 CSA Provincial One-Day Challenge, with eleven dismissals in ten matches.

In September 2019, he was named as the captain of Free State's squad for the 2019–20 CSA Provincial T20 Cup. In April 2021, he was named in Free State's squad, ahead of the 2021–22 cricket season in South Africa.
