= Kirwin Christoffels =

South African cricketer (born 1994)

Personal information
- Full name: Kirwin Christoffels
- Born: 31 October 1994 (age 32); Queenstown, Eastern Cape, South Africa
- Batting: Left-handed
- Bowling: Right-arm fast

Domestic team information
- Years: Team
- 2014–present: Eastern Province

Career statistics
Competition	FC	LA	T20
Matches	6	1	1
Runs scored	184	0	5
Batting average	16.72	0.00	5.00
100s/50s	0/1	0/0	0/0
Top score	51	0	5
Balls bowled	120	0	12
Wickets	1	0	1
Bowling average	42.00	—	15.00
5 wickets in innings	0	0	0
10 wickets in match	0	0	0
Best bowling	1/42	—	1/15
Catches/stumpings	1/0	0/0	2/0
- Source: ESPNcricinfo

Kirwin Christoffels (born 31 October 1994) is a South African cricketer. He was part of South Africa's squad for the 2014 ICC Under-19 Cricket World Cup.
