= Stefan Klopper =

South African cricketer (born 1996)

Personal information
- Born: 19 February 1996 (age 30); Pretoria, South Africa
- Source: ESPNcricinfo, 9 February 2017

Stefan Klopper (born 19 February 1996) is a South African cricketer. He made his first-class debut for Northerns in the 2016–17 Sunfoil 3-Day Cup on 9 February 2017. He made his List A debut for Northerns in the 2016–17 CSA Provincial One-Day Challenge on 12 March 2017.
