= Sohail Mahmoud =

South African cricketer (born 1996)

Personal information
- Born: 12 April 1996 (age 30); Durban, South Africa
- Source: ESPNcricinfo, 1 September 2016

Sohail Mahmoud (born 12 April 1996) is a South African cricketer. He was included in the KZN Inland squad for the 2016 Africa T20 Cup. In September 2018, he was named in KwaZulu-Natal Inland's squad for the 2018 Africa T20 Cup.
