= Jack Newby =

South African cricketer (born 1993)

Personal information
- Full name: Jack Peter Christopher Newby
- Born: 20 November 1993 (age 32); Islington, London, England
- Source: ESPNcricinfo, 2 September 2016

Jack Newby (born 20 November 1993) is a South African cricketer. He made his Twenty20 cricket debut for Western Province on 4 September 2015 in the 2015 Africa T20 Cup. He made his List A debut for Western Province in the 2017–18 CSA Provincial One-Day Challenge on 11 February 2018.
