= Smangaliso Nhlebela =

South African cricketer (born 1994)

Personal information
- Born: 2 June 1994 (age 32)
- Source: ESPNcricinfo, 21 September 2016

Smangaliso Nhlebela (born 2 June 1994) is a South African first-class cricketer. He was included in KwaZulu-Natal's squad for the 2016 Africa T20 Cup. He made his Twenty20 debut for KwaZulu-Natal against Boland in the 2016 Africa T20 Cup on 23 September 2016.

He was the leading wicket-taker in the 2017–18 CSA Provincial One-Day Challenge tournament for KwaZulu-Natal, with 13 dismissals in nine matches. He was also the joint-leading wicket-taker in the 2017–18 Sunfoil 3-Day Cup for KwaZulu-Natal, with 35 dismissals in ten matches.

In July 2018, he was named in the Cricket South Africa Emerging Squad. In September 2018, he was named in KwaZulu-Natal's squad for the 2018 Africa T20 Cup. In September 2019, he was named in KwaZulu-Natal's squad for the 2019–20 CSA Provincial T20 Cup.
