= Mishkal Ramsaroop =

South African cricketer (born 1993)

Personal information
- Born: 20 August 1993 (age 33); Durban, South Africa
- Source: Cricinfo, 6 September 2015

Mishkal Ramsaroop (born 20 August 1993) is a South African first-class cricketer. He was included in the KwaZulu-Natal cricket team squad for the 2015 Africa T20 Cup.
