= Warren Bell =

South African cricketer (born 1986)

Personal information
- Born: 23 July 1986 (age 40); Port Elizabeth, South Africa
- Source: Cricinfo, 4 September 2015

Warren Bell (born 23 July 1986) is a South African first-class cricketer. He was included in the Griqualand West cricket team squad for the 2015 Africa T20 Cup.

He was the leading wicket-taker in the 2017–18 CSA Provincial One-Day Challenge tournament for Northern Cape, with nine dismissals in five matches.
