= Hanno Kotze =

South African cricketer (born 1994)

Personal information
- Born: 5 June 1994 (age 32); Cape Town, South Africa
- Source: Cricinfo, 6 September 2015

Hanno Kotze (born 5 June 1994) is a South African cricketer. He was included in the South Western Districts cricket team squad for the 2015 Africa T20 Cup.

He was the leading run-scorer in the 2017–18 CSA Provincial One-Day Challenge tournament for South Western Districts, with 336 runs in nine matches.

In September 2018, he was named in Boland's squad for the 2018 Africa T20 Cup. He was the leading run-scorer for Boland in the tournament, with 138 runs in four matches. He was also the leading run-scorer for Boland in the 2018–19 CSA 3-Day Provincial Cup, with 598 runs in nine matches.

In September 2019, he was named in Boland's squad for the 2019–20 CSA Provincial T20 Cup. In April 2021, he was named in South Western Districts' squad, ahead of the 2021–22 cricket season in South Africa.
