= Jean Bredenkamp =

South African cricketer

Personal information
- Full name: Jean Bredenkamp
- Born: 12 January 1993 (age 33); Pretoria, South Africa
- Batting: Right-handed
- Bowling: Right-arm medium-fast

International information
- National side: Namibia

Domestic team information
- Years: Team
- 2010–2017: Boland

Career statistics
Competition	First-class	List A
Matches	39	22
Runs scored	1860	1005
Batting average	26.57	52.89
100s/50s	2/10	2/7
Top score	114	164*
Balls bowled	636	177
Wickets	7	5
Bowling average	51.71	21.80
5 wickets in innings	0	0
10 wickets in match	0	0
Best bowling	2-12	2-15
Catches/stumpings	22/-	7/-
- Source: Cricinfo, 22 May 2019

Jean Bredenkamp (born 12 January 1993) is a South African cricketer who played for Boland. He is a right-handed batsman and right-arm medium-fast bowler. Bredenkamp made his first-class debut on 10 March 2011 against Gauteng.

In October 2017, he made his career-best score in List A cricket, with 164 not out, batting for Namibia against Boland in the 2017–18 CSA Provincial One-Day Challenge.

In January 2018, he was named in Namibia's squad for the 2018 ICC World Cricket League Division Two tournament. In March 2019, he was named in Namibia's squad for the 2019 ICC World Cricket League Division Two tournament.

In June 2019, he was one of twenty-five cricketers to be named in Cricket Namibia's Elite Men's Squad ahead of the 2019–20 international season.
