= Desmond de Koker =

South African cricketer (born 1991)

Personal information
- Born: 1 June 1991 (age 35); Kimberley, South Africa
- Source: ESPNcricinfo, 11 November 2016

Desmond de Koker (born 1 June 1991) is a South African cricketer. He made his first-class debut for Free State in the 2010–11 CSA Provincial Three-Day Challenge on 18 November 2010. In September 2019, he was named in Northern Cape's squad for the 2019–20 CSA Provincial T20 Cup.
