= Emmanuel Mkhize =

South African cricketer (born 1989)

Emmanuel Mkhize (born 4 July 1989) is a South African cricketer. He is a right-handed batsman and a right-arm medium-fast bowler who plays for KwaZulu-Natal. He was born in Pietermaritzburg. Mkhize currently coaches cricket at Michaelhouse.

Mkhize made his first-class debut in November 2008 against Boland.
