= Ryan Cartwright (cricketer) =

South African cricketer (born 1992)

Personal information
- Born: 25 January 1992 (age 34)
- Source: Cricinfo, 21 January 2018

Ryan Cartwright (born 25 January 1992) is a South African cricketer. He made his first-class debut for Northerns in the 2013–14 CSA Provincial Three-Day Competition on 3 October 2013. He made his List A debut for Northerns in the 2013–14 CSA Provincial One-Day Competition on 17 November 2013. He was the leading wicket-taker for Easterns in the 2018–19 CSA 3-Day Provincial Cup, with 26 dismissals in eight matches.

In September 2019, he was named in Easterns' squad for the 2019–20 CSA Provincial T20 Cup. He made his Twenty20 debut for Easterns in the 2019–20 CSA Provincial T20 Cup on 13 September 2019. In April 2021, he was named in Easterns' squad, ahead of the 2021–22 cricket season in South Africa.
