= Giovanni Joseph =

South African cricketer (born 1989)

Personal information
- Born: 13 June 1989 (age 37)
- Source: Cricinfo, 21 January 2018

Giovanni Joseph (born 13 June 1989) is a South African cricketer. He made his first-class debut for Northern Cape in the 2007–08 CSA Provincial Three-Day Competition on 14 February 2008. He made his List A debut for Northern Cape in the 2014–15 CSA Provincial One-Day Competition on 18 January 2015.
