= Edrich Lubbe (cricketer) =

South African cricketer (born 1993)

Personal information
- Born: 6 March 1993 (age 32)
- Source: Cricinfo, 10 March 2018

Edrich Lubbe (born 6 March 1993) is a South African cricketer. He made his first-class debut for Gauteng in the 2013–14 CSA Provincial Three-Day Competition on 13 February 2014.
