= Loyiso Mdashe =

South African cricketer (born 1989)

Personal information
- Born: 4 June 1989 (age 37)
- Source: Cricinfo, 8 September 2017

Loyiso Mdashe (born 4 June 1989) is a South African cricketer. He made his first-class debut for Border in the Sunfoil 3-Day Cup on 19 February 2015. In September 2017, he was named in Free State's squad for the 2017 Africa T20 Cup. He made his List A debut for Free State in the 2017–18 CSA Provincial One-Day Challenge on 15 October 2017.

In September 2018, he was named in Free State's squad for the 2018 Africa T20 Cup.
