= Kelly Smuts =

South African cricketer

Personal information
- Born: 22 January 1990 (age 36); Grahamstown, South Africa
- Batting: Left-handed
- Bowling: Right-arm medium

Domestic team information
- Years: Team
- 2009/10–2019/20: Eastern Province
- 2010/11–2019/20: Warriors
- 2020/21–: South Western Districts
- 2022/23: Northern Cape

Career statistics
Competition	FC	LA	T20
Matches	124	95	61
Runs scored	6,094	1993	838
Batting average	32.94	24.60	20.43
100s/50s	15/28	0/13	0/3
Top score	170*	91	64
Balls bowled	7711	1914	474
Wickets	138	55	29
Bowling average	27.57	25.56	20.93
5 wickets in innings	6	1	0
10 wickets in match	1	0	0
Best bowling	3/43	5/34	3/17
Catches/stumpings	86/–	32/–	25/–
- Source: Cricinfo, 13 April 2025

Kelly Royce Smuts (born 22 January 1990) is a South African cricketer. He is a left-handed batsman and right-arm medium-pace bowler who plays for Eastern Province. He was born in Grahamstown.

Smuts made his cricketing debut for South Africa Under-19s, playing a single Under-19 Test match against Bangladesh. He later played two matches in a Tri-Nation tournament, one against Bangladesh and one against India.

Smuts made two appearances during the CSA Under-19 Competition in 2008–09. Smuts made his first-class debut for Eastern Province during the 2009–10 season, against Gauteng. He was included in the Eastern Province cricket team squad for the 2015 Africa T20 Cup. In the 2015–16 Sunfoil 3-Day Cup, he became the first player to make a century and take 13 wickets during a first-class match in South Africa. In April 2017, he made the highest total in the history of the Lancashire League, scoring 211 for Todmorden Cricket Club.

In August 2017, he was named in Durban Qalandars' squad for the first season of the T20 Global League. However, in October 2017, Cricket South Africa initially postponed the tournament until November 2018, with it being cancelled soon after.

He was the leading run-scorer in the 2017–18 Sunfoil 3-Day Cup for Eastern Province, with 646 runs in eight matches.

In September 2018, he was named in Eastern Province's squad for the 2018 Africa T20 Cup. In September 2019, he was named in Eastern Province's squad for the 2019–20 CSA Provincial T20 Cup.

Smuts' brother, JJ Smuts, is also a first-class cricketer.
