= Jomu Mbili =

South African cricketer (born 1981)

Jomu Mbili (born 16 October 1981) is a South African cricketer. He is a right-handed batsman and a right-arm medium-fast bowler. He was born in Pietermaritzburg.

Mbili made his first-class debut for KwaZulu-Natal Inland during the 2008–09 season.

== See also ==
- Cricket in South Africa
