= Letlotlo Sesele =

South African cricketer (born 1988)

Personal information
- Born: 23 March 1988 (age 38); Bloemfontein, South Africa
- Source: Cricinfo, 5 November 2015

Letlotlo Sesele (born 23 March 1988) is a South African first-class cricketer who plays for the Knights cricket team.
