= Romano Terblanche =

South African cricketer (born 1986)

Personal information
- Born: 10 June 1986 (age 40); Bloemfontein, South Africa
- Source: Cricinfo, 6 September 2015

Romano Terblanche (born 10 June 1986) is a South African first class cricketer. He was included in the Free State cricket team squad for the 2015 Africa T20 Cup.

Terblanche was the joint-leading wicket-taker in the 2017–18 CSA Provincial One-Day Challenge tournament for Free State, with 13 dismissals in nine matches.

In September 2018, Terblanche was named in Free State's squad for the 2018 Africa T20 Cup. In September 2019, he was named in Free State's squad for the 2019–20 CSA Provincial T20 Cup.
