= Hassen Dawood =

South African cricket umpire (born 1976)

Personal information
- Born: 28 February 1976 (age 50); Pretoria, South Africa

Umpiring information
- Source: Cricinfo, 28 February 2017

Hassen Dawood (born 28 February 1976) is a South African cricket umpire. He has stood in matches in the 2016–17 Sunfoil 3-Day Cup and the 2016–17 CSA Provincial One-Day Challenge tournaments.
