= Kevin Lawrence (umpire) =

South African cricket umpire (born 1987)

Personal information
- Born: 18 October 1987 (age 39)

Umpiring information
- Source: Cricinfo, 19 October 2017

Kevin Lawrence (born 18 October 1987) is a South African cricket umpire. He has stood in domestic matches in the 2017–18 Sunfoil 3-Day Cup and the 2016–17 CSA Provincial One-Day Challenge.
