= Kushen Kishun =

South African cricketer (born 1991)

Personal information
- Born: 10 July 1991 (age 35)
- Source: ESPNcricinfo, 15 October 2016

Kushen Kishun (born 10 July 1991) is a South African cricketer. He made his first-class debut for KwaZulu-Natal in the 2010–11 CSA Provincial Three-Day Challenge on 10 February 2011.
