= Brady Barends =

South African cricketer (born 1989)

Personal information
- Born: 21 January 1989 (age 37); Durban, South Africa
- Source: Cricinfo, 3 September 2015

Brady Barends (born 21 January 1989) is a South African first-class cricketer. He was included in the North West cricket team squad for the 2015 Africa T20 Cup. He was the leading wicket-taker in the 2017–18 Sunfoil 3-Day Cup for North West, with 32 dismissals in ten matches.

In September 2018, he was named in North West's squad for the 2018 Africa T20 Cup. In September 2019, he was named in North West's squad for the 2019–20 CSA Provincial T20 Cup.
