= Ayavuya Myoli =

South African cricketer (born 1990)

Personal information
- Born: 8 June 1990 (age 36); King William's Town, South Africa
- Source: Cricinfo, 1 September 2016

Ayavuya Myoli (born 8 June 1990) is a South African cricketer. He was included in the North West squad for the 2016 Africa T20 Cup. In September 2019, he was named in Gauteng's squad for the 2019–20 CSA Provincial T20 Cup.
