= Thandolwethu Mnyaka =

South African cricketer (born 1993)

Personal information
- Born: 15 January 1993 (age 33); Middledrift, Cape Province, South Africa

Domestic team information
- Years: Team
- 2013–2017: Border
- 2016: Warriors
- 2017–2018: Northern Cape
- 2018–2021: Free State
- 2019: Knights
- 2021–: Border
- First-class debut: 31 January 2013 Border v Easterns
- List A debut: 13 October 2013 Border v Free State

Career statistics
Competition	FC	LA	T20
Matches	68	31	31
Runs scored	1,109	199	70
Batting average	15.61	10.47	7.77
100s/50s	0/5	0/0	0/0
Top score	80	45	34
Balls bowled	8,154	1,151	533
Wickets	175	36	28
Bowling average	27.16	26.13	23.35
5 wickets in innings	4	0	1
10 wickets in match	0	0	0
Best bowling	5/14	4/18	5/23
Catches/stumpings	22/0	2	2
- Source: CricketArchive (subscription required), 5 October 2021

Thandolwethu Mnyaka (born 15 January 1993) is a South African cricketer who plays for the Border. He was the leading wicket-taker in the 2017–18 Sunfoil 3-Day Cup for Northern Cape, with 20 dismissals in eight matches.

In September 2018, Mnyaka was named in Free State's squad for the 2018 Africa T20 Cup. He was the leading wicket-taker for Free State in the 2018–19 CSA 3-Day Provincial Cup, with 21 dismissals in seven matches. In September 2019, he was named in Free State's squad for the 2019–20 CSA Provincial T20 Cup.
