= Tshepang Dithole =

South African cricketer (born 1993)

Personal information
- Full name: Tshepang Alvin Dithole
- Born: 10 March 1993 (age 33); Johannesburg, South Africa
- Source: ESPNcricinfo, 1 September 2016

Tshepang Dithole (born 10 March 1993) is a South African cricketer. He was included in the KZN Inland squad for the 2016 Africa T20 Cup. In June 2018, he was named in the Cricket South Africa Emerging Squad. In April 2021, he was named in KwaZulu-Natal Inland's squad, ahead of the 2021–22 cricket season in South Africa.
