= Matt McGillivray =

South African cricketer (born 1990)

Personal information
- Born: 28 August 1990 (age 36); Johannesburg, South Africa
- Source: ESPNcricinfo, 20 September 2016

Matt McGillivray (born 28 August 1990) is a South African first-class cricketer. He was included in the Highveld Lions squad for the 2016–17 Sunfoil Series.
