= Zakhele Qwabe =

South African cricketer (born 1988)

Personal information
- Born: 25 May 1988 (age 38); Durban, Natal Province, South Africa
- Source: Cricinfo, 1 September 2015

Zakhele Qwabe (born 25 May 1988) is a South African first-class cricketer. He was included in the Boland cricket team squad for the 2015 Africa T20 Cup.

He was the leading wicket-taker in the 2017–18 Sunfoil 3-Day Cup for Boland, with 34 dismissals in ten matches. In April 2021, he was named in Boland's squad, ahead of the 2021–22 cricket season in South Africa.
