= Zakariya Paruk =

South African cricketer (born 1998)

Personal information
- Born: 29 April 1998 (age 28); Durban, South Africa
- Source: ESPNcricinfo, 9 February 2017

Zakariya Paruk (born 29 April 1998) is a South African professional cricketer. He made his first-class debut for KwaZulu-Natal in the 2016–17 Sunfoil 3-Day Cup on 9 February 2017. He made his List A debut for KwaZulu-Natal in the 2016–17 CSA Provincial One-Day Challenge on 12 February 2017. He made his Twenty20 debut for KwaZulu-Natal in the 2017 Africa T20 Cup on 8 September 2017.

In September 2018, he was named in KwaZulu-Natal's squad for the 2018 Africa T20 Cup. In April 2021, he was named in KwaZulu-Natal Inland's squad, ahead of the 2021–22 cricket season in South Africa.
