= Kerwin Mungroo =

South African cricketer (born 1994)

Personal information
- Born: 31 July 1994 (age 32)
- Source: ESPNcricinfo, 15 October 2016

Kerwin Mungroo (born 31 July 1994) is a South African professional cricketer. He made his first-class debut for KwaZulu-Natal Inland in the 2015–16 Sunfoil 3-Day Cup on 18 March 2016. He made his List A debut for KwaZulu-Natal Inland in the 2016–17 CSA Provincial One-Day Challenge on 26 February 2017. He made his Twenty20 debut for KwaZulu-Natal Inland in the 2017 Africa T20 Cup on 15 September 2017.

In July 2018, he was named in the Cricket South Africa Emerging Squad. In September 2018, he was named in KwaZulu-Natal Inland's squad for the 2018 Africa T20 Cup. The following month, he was named in Paarl Rocks' squad for the first edition of the Mzansi Super League T20 tournament. In April 2021, he was named in KwaZulu-Natal's squad, ahead of the 2021–22 cricket season in South Africa.
