= Mario Saliwa =

South African cricketer (1984–2015)

Personal information
- Full name: Mario Ngqiuyomizi Saliwa
- Born: 6 March 1984; King William's Town, South Africa
- Died: 31 May 2015 (aged 31)
- Batting: Right-handed
- Source: ESPNcricinfo

Mario Ngqiuyomizi Saliwa (6 March 1984 – 31 May 2015) was a South African first-class cricketer. He died of injuries after being stabbed.
