= Richardt Frenz =

South African cricketer (born 1992)

Personal information
- Born: 28 August 1992 (age 34); Pretoria, South Africa
- Source: ESPNcricinfo, 23 October 2016

Richardt Frenz (born 28 August 1992) is a South African first-class cricketer. He made his first-class debut for North West in the 2013–14 CSA Provincial Three-Day Competition on 27 March 2014.
