= Mkhululi Calana =

South African cricketer (born 1993)

Personal information
- Born: 19 January 1993 (age 33); Cape Town, South Africa
- Source: ESPNcricinfo, 7 September 2016

Mkhululi Calana (born 19 January 1993) is a South African first-class cricketer. He was included in the Border squad for the 2016 Africa T20 Cup.
