= Laurance Willemse =

South African cricket umpire (born 1962)

Personal information
- Born: 24 March 1962 (age 64); Beaufort West, South Africa

Umpiring information
- Source: Cricinfo, 28 February 2017

Laurance Willemse (born 24 March 1962) is a South African cricket umpire. He has stood in matches in the 2016–17 Sunfoil 3-Day Cup and the 2016–17 CSA Provincial One-Day Challenge tournaments. He also stood in a tour match between the South African Invitational XI and England XI in December 2009.
