= Driaan Bruwer =

South African cricketer (born 1995)

Personal information
- Full name: Dirk Hendrik Bruwer
- Born: 6 January 1995 (age 31); Pretoria, South Africa
- Batting: Left-handed
- Bowling: Legbreak

Domestic team information
- Years: Team
- 2015–present: Free State

Career statistics
Competition	FC	T20
Matches	2	1
Runs scored	34	7
Batting average	11.33	7.00
100s/50s	0/0	0/0
Top score	14	7
Balls bowled	86	18
Wickets	4	0
Bowling average	12.00	—
5 wickets in innings	0	0
10 wickets in match	0	0
Best bowling	3/35	—
Catches/stumpings	2/0	0/0
- Source: ESPNcricinfo

Driaan Bruwer (born 6 January 1995) is a South African first-class cricketer. He was part of South Africa's squad for the 2014 ICC Under-19 Cricket World Cup. He was included in the Free State cricket team squad for the 2015 Africa T20 Cup. He made his List A debut for Free State in the 2016–17 CSA Provincial One-Day Challenge on 9 October 2016.
