= Lester Leendertz =

South African cricket umpire (born 1967)

Personal information
- Born: 16 February 1967 (age 59); Bellvile, South Africa

Umpiring information
- Source: Cricinfo, 2 March 2017

Lester Leendertz (born 16 February 1967) is a South African cricket umpire. He has stood in matches in the 2016–17 Sunfoil 3-Day Cup and the 2016–17 CSA Provincial One-Day Challenge tournaments.
