= Michael Loubser =

South African cricketer (born 1990)

Personal information
- Born: 9 September 1990 (age 36); Cape Town, South Africa
- Source: Cricinfo, 1 September 2015

Michael Loubser (born 9 September 1990) is a South African first class cricketer. He was included in the Boland cricket team squad for the 2015 Africa T20 Cup.
