= Gerhardt Abrahams =

South African cricketer (born 1990)

Personal information
- Born: 9 August 1990 (age 36); Kimberley, South Africa
- Source: Cricinfo, 4 September 2015

Gerhardt Abrahams (born 9 August 1990) is a South African first class cricketer. He was included in the Griqualand West cricket team squad for the 2015 Africa T20 Cup.
