= Kagiso Rapulana =

South African cricketer (born 1991)

Personal information
- Born: 6 July 1991 (age 35); Johannesburg, South Africa
- Source: Cricinfo, 1 September 2016

Kagiso "Jonty" Rapulana (born 6 July 1991) is a South African cricketer. He was included in the North West squad for the 2016 Africa T20 Cup. In November 2017, he scored 259 not out batting for North West against Northern Cape in the 2017–18 Sunfoil 3-Day Cup, his highest score in first-class cricket.

In June 2018, he was named in the squad for the Highveld Lions team for the 2018–19 season. The following month, he was named in the Cricket South Africa Emerging Squad. In September 2018, he was named in North West's squad for the 2018 Africa T20 Cup. He was the leading run-scorer for North West in the 2018–19 CSA Provincial One-Day Challenge, with 391 runs in five matches.

In September 2019, he was named in North West's squad for the 2019–20 CSA Provincial T20 Cup. In April 2021, he was named in Gauteng's squad, ahead of the 2021–22 cricket season in South Africa. As of 2024 Kagiso plays for Dalton cricket club in Dalton in Furness Cumbria England.
