= Lefa Mosena =

South African cricketer (born 1987)

Personal information
- Born: 18 March 1987 (age 39); Bloemfontein, South Africa
- Source: Cricinfo, 1 September 2015

Lefa Mosena (born 18 March 1987) is a South African first-class cricketer. He was included in the KZN Inland squad for the 2015 Africa T20 Cup.
