= Michael Erlank =

South African cricketer (born 1990)

Personal information
- Born: 4 July 1990 (age 36); Kimberley, South Africa
- Source: Cricinfo, 6 September 2015

Michael Erlank (born 4 July 1990) is a South African first-class cricketer. He was included in the Free State cricket team squad for the 2015 Africa T20 Cup. He was the leading run-scorer in the 2017–18 Sunfoil 3-Day Cup for KwaZulu-Natal, with 599 runs in eleven matches.

In September 2018, he was named in KwaZulu-Natal's squad for the 2018 Africa T20 Cup. In September 2019, he was named in KwaZulu-Natal's squad for the 2019–20 CSA Provincial T20 Cup. In April 2021, he was named in KwaZulu-Natal Inland's squad, ahead of the 2021–22 cricket season in South Africa.
