= Northerns cricket team =

South African Cricket team

Northerns (formerly North Eastern Transvaal and Northern Transvaal) has played first-class cricket in South Africa since December 1937. Its territory is the area north of Johannesburg, including Pretoria.

For the purposes of the SuperSport Series, Northerns has merged with Easterns (formerly Eastern Transvaal) to form the Titans.

== Current squad ==
Squad for 2026/27 Season. Players in bold have played international cricket.

Name	Nationality	Birth date	Batting style	Bowling style	Notes
Batters
**Dewald Brevis**	South Africa	29 April 2003 (age 23)	Right-handed	Right-arm wrist spin	National Contract
Leus du Plooy	South AfricaHungary	12 January 1995 (age 31)	Left-handed	Left-arm orthodox spin	
**Aiden Markram**	South Africa	4 October 1994 (age 31)	Right-handed	Right-arm orthodox spin	National Contract
Kagiso Ngwenya	South Africa	4 May 2002 (age 24)	Right-handed	Right-arm seam	High-Performance Contract
**Keegan Petersen**	South Africa	8 August 1993 (age 32)	Right-handed	Right-arm wrist spin	
Jorich van Schalkwyk	South Africa	11 August 2006 (age 19)	Right-handed	Right-arm orthodox spin	High-Performance Contract
Wicket-keepers
Tshepang Dithole	South Africa	10 March 1993 (age 33)	Left-handed	Right-arm orthodox spin	
Keagan Lion-Cachet	South Africa	19 March 2002 (age 24)	Right-handed		
Rivaldo Moonsamy	South Africa	13 September 1996 (age 29)	Right-handed	Right-arm orthodox spin	
**Lhuan-dre Pretorius**	South Africa	27 March 2006 (age 20)	Left-handed		Player of National Interest
**Sinethemba Qeshile**	South Africa	10 February 1999 (age 27)	Right-handed		Player of National Interest
Lethabo Phahlomohlaka	South Africa	7 October 2007 (age 18)	Left-handed	Right-arm orthodox spin	High-Performance Contract
All-rounders
**Corbin Bosch**	South Africa	10 September 1994 (age 31)	Right-handed	Right-arm seam	National Contract
**Eathan Bosch**	South Africa	27 April 1998 (age 28)	Right-handed	Right-arm seam	
Divan de Villiers	South Africa	4 January 2006 (age 20)	Right-handed	Right-arm seam	High-Performance Contract
**Donovan Ferreira**	South Africa	21 July 1998 (age 28)	Right-handed	Right-arm orthodox spin	
**Dayyaan Galiem**	South Africa	2 January 1997 (age 29)	Right-handed	Right-arm seam	
Duan Jansen	South Africa	1 May 2000 (age 26)	Right-handed	Left-arm seam	
**Marco Jansen**	South Africa	1 May 2000 (age 26)	Right-handed	Left-arm seam	National Contract
Evan Jones	South Africa	5 August 1996 (age 29)	Right-handed	Right-arm seam	
**Andile Phehlukwayo**	South Africa	3 March 1996 (age 30)	Left-handed	Right-arm seam	
Beyers Swanepoel	South Africa	6 May 1998 (age 28)	Left-handed	Right-arm seam	
**Roelof van der Merwe**	NetherlandsSouth Africa	31 December 1984 (age 41)	Right-handed	Left-arm orthodox spin	High-Performance Contract
Bowlers
Esosa Aihevba	South Africa	20 February 2006 (age 20)	Right-handed	Right-arm seam	High-Performance Contract
Jarren Bacher	South Africa	22 November 2003 (age 22)	Right-handed	Right-arm orthodox spin	High-Performance Contract
**Junior Dala**	South AfricaZambia	29 December 1989 (age 36)	Right-handed	Right-arm seam	
Schalk Engelbrecht	South Africa	25 August 2003 (age 22)	Right-handed	Right-arm orthodox spin	High-Performance Contract
**Simon Harmer**	South Africa	10 February 1989 (age 37)	Right-handed	Right-arm orthodox spin	National Contract
Aphiwe Mnyanda	South Africa	3 May 2004 (age 22)	Right-handed	Left-arm seam	
Tsepo Ndwandwa	South Africa	16 April 1995 (age 31)	Right-handed	Left-arm orthodox spin	
**Lungi Ngidi**	South Africa	25 August 2003 (age 22)	Right-handed	Right-arm seam	National Contract
Janco Smit	South Africa	2 February 2001 (age 25)	Right-handed	Right-arm seam	High-Performance Contract

== Honours ==
- South African Airways Provincial Three-Day Challenge (1) – 2005–06; shared (1) – 2014–15
- South African Airways Provincial One-Day Challenge (1) – 2005–06

== Club history ==
Northerns was called North Eastern Transvaal from December 1937 until April 1971, when it became Northern Transvaal until April 1997. It had removed "Transvaal" from its name after the Transvaal became Gauteng, and a new province called Northern Transvaal (later renamed Limpopo) was created, that excluded Pretoria. The team has been part of the Titans cricket team from October 2004.

Under the name North Eastern Transvaal the team played 134 first-class matches, winning 40, losing 57 and drawing 37. Under the names North Eastern Transvaal and Northern Transvaal the team played 325 first-class matches, winning 81, losing 142 and drawing 102. Altogether, up till late January 2017, the team had played 509 first-class matches, winning 150, losing 179 and drawing 180.

== Venues ==
Venues have included:

- Berea Park, Pretoria (Dec 1937 – Jan 1986; previously used by Transvaal)
- Olympia Park, Springs (occasional venue Dec 1937 – Nov 1994; used once by Easterns in 1994)
- Hosking Park, Brakpan (temporary venue March 1946 – Nov 1946)
- Willowmoore Park, Benoni (Jan 1948 – Nov 1968; previously used by Transvaal; Easterns venue from 1996 to present)
- Caledonian Stadium, Pretoria (Dec 1951 – Dec 1952)
- Loftus Versfeld, Pretoria (occasional venue Dec 1956 – Oct 1959)
- Pietersburg Cricket Club A Ground (four matches 1983 – 1985)
- SuperSport Park, Centurion (main venue Dec 1986–present)
- Technikon Oval, Pretoria (two matches 1992 – 2003)
- Irene Villagers Cricket Club Ground, Irene (Dec 2015)

== See also ==
- Northerns women's cricket team, the women's counterpart

== Sources ==
- South African Cricket Annual – various editions
- Wisden Cricketers' Almanack – various editions
