= KwaZulu-Natal Inland cricket team =

Cricket team

Tuskers Cricket
Personnel
- Captain: Michael Erlank
- Coach: Ahmed Amla

Team information
- Colours: Black Blue
- Founded: 2006
- Home ground: City Oval, Pietermaritzburg
- Capacity: 12,000
- Official website: https://kznicu.wordpress.com/

KwaZulu-Natal Inland are a South African first-class cricket team who are based in Pietermaritzburg. They are one of fifteen South African provincial teams. Their home games are played at Pietermaritzburg Oval.

KwaZulu-Natal Inland were granted first-class status in 2006 and took part in the 2006-07 South African Airways Provincial Three-Day Challenge. They used to take part in the Provincial Three-Day Challenge tournament and the Provincial One-Day Competition. During the restructuring of domestic cricket in South Africa in 2021 they were placed in the second division. In 2023 they were promoted to the first division of CSA domestic cricket.

In 2021, along with the restructuring of CSA domestic cricket, KZN Inland's team were rebranded as the Tuskers with the current title sponsor being AET.

The KZNICU's jurisdiction covers by far the largest landmass in KZN, stretching from Zululand in the north to East Griqualand in the south, and the provincial boundaries of Mpumalanga, Free State, Lesotho and the Eastern Cape in the west, and in the east, a line following the eastern boundaries of the Sisonke, uMgungundlovu, Umzinyathi and Zululand district municipalities.

For ease of administration, the KZNICU jurisdiction closely follows the district municipality demarcations of Zululand, Umzinyathi, Amajuba, uThukhela, Sisonke and uMgundundlovu.

Each of the six districts is represented by sub-unions that are affiliated to the KZNICU. The set-up is dominated by the Maritzburg Cricket Association and Midlands Cricket Union (uMgungundlovu), while the East Griqualand Cricket Union and the Southern District Cricket Union comprise Sisonke, Northern District Cricket Union (Amajuba), Umzinyathi Cricket Association (Umzinyathi), Northern Natal Cricket Board (uThukela) and the Northern District Cricket Union in Zululand make up the other sub-unions.

== Current squad ==
Squad for 2026/27 Season. Players in bold have played international cricket.

Name	Nationality	Birth date	Batting style	Bowling style	Notes
Batters
Muhammed Bulbulia	South Africa	6 September 2006 (age 20)	Right-handed		High-performance contract
Ludwig Kaestner	South Africa	19 June 2000 (age 26)	Right-handed	Right-arm seam	
Jack Lees	South Africa	6 August 2001 (age 25)	Left-handed	Right-arm orthodox spin	
Isma-eel Omar	South Africa		Right-handed		High-performance Contract
Kagiso Rapulana	South Africa	6 July 1991 (age 35)	Right-handed	Right-arm seam	
Matthew Urquhart	South Africa	8 April 2005 (age 21)	Right-handed	Right-arm orthodox spin	High-performance Contract
Wicket-keepers
Cameron Shekleton	South Africa	21 January 2000 (age 26)	Right-handed		
Joshua van Biljon	South Africa	11 January 2008 (age 18)	Right-handed	Right-arm seam	High-performance contract
All-rounders
Michael Erlank	South Africa	4 July 1990 (age 36)	Left-handed	Right-arm orthodox spin	
Daelynn Fynn	South Africa	25 October 1999 (age 26)	Right-handed	Right-arm orthodox spin	High-performance Contract
Chad Laycock	South Africa	14 April 2003 (age 23)	Right-handed	Right-arm seam	
Jared Meiring	South Africa	16 April 2002 (age 24)	Right-handed	Right-arm seam	High-performance contract
Malcolm Nofal	South Africa	18 September 1991 (age 35)	Left-handed	Left-arm orthodox spin	
James Ritchie	South Africa	26 April 2000 (age 26)	Left-handed	Right-arm wrist spin	High-performance Contract
Bamanye Xenxe	South Africa	25 April 1997 (age 29)	Right-handed	Right-arm seam	
Bowlers
Ziyaad Abrahams	South Africa	27 March 1997 (age 29)	Right-handed	Right-arm seam	
Jesse Albanie	South Africa	6 August 1999 (age 27)	Right-handed	Right-arm seam	
Thabiso Ndlela	South Africa	14 December 2004 (age 21)	Right-handed	Right-arm seam	
Parth Patel	South Africa		Right-handed	Right-arm wrist spin	High-performance Contract
Rowan Rajah	South Africa	16 August 2007 (age 19)	Left-handed	Right-arm seam	High-performance Contract
Liyema Waqu	South Africa	19 June 2004 (age 22)	Right-handed	Left-arm seam	

== Honours ==
The KZN Inland team won the 2017 Africa T20 Cup. They defeated Free State in the final.

== Sources ==
- South African Cricket Annual – various editions
- Wisden Cricketers' Almanack – various editions
