= 2016–17 Momentum One Day Cup =

Cricket tournament

- Dates: 17 February 2017 – 31 March 2017
- Administrator(s): Cricket South Africa
- Cricket format: List A
- Tournament format(s): Double round-robin and playoffs
- Champions: Titans
- Participants: 6
- Most runs: Henry Davids (673)
- Most wickets: Junior Dala (16); Robbie Frylinck (16); Shadley van Schalkwyk (16)

The 2016–17 Momentum One Day Cup was a domestic one-day cricket championship in South Africa. It was the 36th time the championship was contested. The competition started on 17 February 2017 and concluded with the final on 31 March 2017. Six teams competed, with the Lions being the defending champions.

Titans topped the group table, securing a home match in the final. Knights and Warriors finished second and third respectively, advancing to the play-off qualifier, with the winner meeting Titans in the final. The qualifier was abandoned after 28 overs of play, due to concerns with the playing surface. The match was replayed on the same pitch the following day, once the groundstaff had prepared the surface. Warriors won the qualifier by 18 runs to advance to the final. Titans won the tournament, defeating Warriors by 236 runs in the final. Titans' total of 425 for 5 in the final was the highest team total in the history of the competition.

== Points table ==
Pos	Team	Pld	W	L	NR	BP	Ded	Pts	NRR
1	Titans	10	7	3	0	5	0	33	1.273
2	Knights	10	6	4	0	3	0	27	0.305
3	Warriors	10	5	4	1	4	0	26	0.195
4	Dolphins	10	5	4	1	2	0	24	0.237
5	Lions	10	3	7	0	1	0	13	−0.951
6	Cape Cobras	10	3	7	0	1	1	12	−0.935

Teams qualified for the finals

== Fixtures ==
=== Round-robin ===
17 February 2017 (D/N)
Scorecard

Titans; 324/7 (50 overs)	v	Dolphins; 325/5 (49.3 overs)
Henry Davids 87 (92); Calvin Savage 4/60 (10 overs)		Sarel Erwee 70 (84); Albie Morkel 2/36 (7 overs)

Dolphins won by 5 wickets
Centurion Park, Centurion
Umpires: Adrian Holdstock and Bongani Jele
Player of the match: Robbie Frylinck (Dolphins)

- Dolphins won the toss and elected to field.

18 February 2017 (D/N)
Scorecard

Knights; 308/6 (50 overs)	v	Cape Cobras; 208 (41.1 overs)
Theunis de Bruyn 132 (117); George Linde 2/62 (10 overs)		Aviwe Mgijima 51 (60); Marchant de Lange 4/35 (10 overs)

Knights won by 100 runs
Mangaung Oval, Bloemfontein
Umpires: Clifford Isaacs and Brad White
Player of the match: Theunis de Bruyn (Knights)

- Knights won the toss and elected to bat.

19 February 2017
Scorecard

Lions; 329/7 (50 overs)	v	Warriors; 285 (50 overs)
Reeza Hendricks 101 (89); JJ Smuts 2/51 (10 overs)		Colin Ingram 69 (69); Beuran Hendricks 3/55 (10 overs)

Lions won by 44 runs
New Wanderers Stadium, Johannesburg
Umpires: Bongani Jele and Allahudien Paleker
Player of the match: Reeza Hendricks (Lions)

- Warriors won the toss and elected to field.

22 February 2017 (D/N)
Scorecard

Cape Cobras; 319/6 (50 overs)	v	Warriors; 262 (44.2 overs)
Richard Levi 73 (55); Ayabulela Gqamane 2/50 (8 overs)		Yaseen Vallie 93* (96); Jason Smith 4/38 (7.2 overs)

Cape Cobras won by 57 runs
Buffalo Park, East London
Umpires: Lubabalo Gcuma and Stephen Harris
Player of the match: Richard Levi (Cape Cobras)

- Cape Cobras won the toss and elected to bat.

24 February 2017 (D/N)
Scorecard

Titans; 400/5 (50 overs)	v	Cape Cobras; 242 (34.5 overs)
Henry Davids 163 (183); Lizaad Williams 4/74 (10 overs)		Dane Vilas 88 (60); Shaun von Berg 4/65 (10 overs)

Titans won by 158 runs
Newlands, Cape Town
Umpires: Stephen Harris and Gerrie Pienaar
Player of the match: Henry Davids (Titans)

- Titans won the toss and elected to bat.

24 February 2017 (D/N)
Scorecard

Dolphins; 245/7 (50 overs)	v	Lions; 218 (46.2 overs)
Sibonelo Makhanya 82 (83); Bjorn Fortuin 3/34 (10 overs)		Temba Bavuma 74 (94); Keshav Maharaj 5/40 (9.2 overs)

Dolphins won by 27 runs
Kingsmead, Durban
Umpires: Johan Cloete and Clifford Isaacs
Player of the match: Keshav Maharaj (Dolphins)

- Lions won the toss and elected to field.

25 February 2017 (D/N)
Scorecard

Warriors; 185 (47.5 overs)	v	Knights; 121 (35.3 overs)
JJ Smuts 33 (56); Dillon du Preez 3/18 (10 overs)		Pite van Biljon 43 (60); JJ Smuts 4/4 (5.3 overs)

Warriors won by 64 runs
Diamond Oval, Kimberley
Umpires: Adrian Holdstock and Brad White
Player of the match: JJ Smuts (Warriors)

- Warriors won the toss and elected to bat.

26 February 2017
Scorecard

Titans; 268/9 (50 overs)	v	Lions; 159 (36.1 overs)
Henry Davids 63 (70); Beuran Hendricks 3/41 (10 overs)		Bjorn Fortuin 34 (49); Junior Dala 3/21 (6 overs)

Titans won by 109 runs
Centurion Park, Centurion
Umpires: Stephen Harris and Dennis Smith
Player of the match: Junior Dala (Titans)

- Lions won the toss and elected to field.
- Willem Mulder (Lions) made his List A debut.

26 February 2017
Scorecard

Dolphins; 256/8 (50 overs)	v	Cape Cobras; 257/7 (49.2 overs)
Morne van Wyk 111 (127); Rory Kleinveldt 4/48 (9 overs)		Omphile Ramela 62 (90); Robbie Frylinck 3/39 (10 overs)

Cape Cobras won by 3 wickets
City Oval, Pietermaritzburg
Umpires: Johan Cloete and Clifford Isaacs

- Dolphins won the toss and elected to bat.

1 March 2017 (D/N)
Scorecard

Knights; 171 (40.1 overs)	v	Dolphins; 176/3 (27.3 overs)
Pite van Biljon 42 (69); Kyle Nipper 4/32 (9.1 overs)		Vaughn van Jaarsveld 71 (47); Mbulelo Budaza 1/21 (2.3 overs)

Dolphins won by 7 wickets
Mangaung Oval, Bloemfontein
Umpires: Adrian Holdstock and Bongani Jele
Player of the match: Kyle Nipper (Dolphins)

- Knights won the toss and elected to bat.

3 March 2017 (D/N)
Scorecard

Cape Cobras; 244 (50 overs)	v	Lions; 247/7 (49.5 overs)
Justin Ontong 80 (101); Willem Mulder 3/50 (10 overs)		Dominic Hendricks 91* (108); Lizaad Williams 3/31 (10 overs)

Lions won by 3 wickets
Boland Park, Paarl
Umpires: Johan Cloete an Allahudien Paleker
Player of the match: Dominic Hendricks (Lions)

- Cape Cobras won the toss and elected to bat.

3 March 2017 (D/N)
Scorecard

Warriors; 274/5 (50 overs)	v	Dolphins; 144 (35.1 overs)
Colin Ingram 105 (112); Prenelan Subrayen 2/67 (10 overs)		Morne van Wyk 36 (25); Ayabulela Gqamane 2/18 (7 overs)

Warriors won by 130 runs
St George's Park, Port Elizabeth
Umpires: Stephen Harris and Brad White
Player of the match: Colin Ingram (Warriors)

- Warriors won the toss and elected to bat.

3 March 2017 (D/N)
Scorecard

Knights; 249 (47.1 overs)	v	Titans; 227 (44.3 overs)
Rudi Second 75 (101); Shaun von Berg 2/44 (10 overs)		David Wiese 46 (42); Mbulelo Budaza 4/43 (9.3 overs)

Knights won by 22 runs
Willowmoore Park, Benoni
Umpires: Shaun George and Adrian Holdstock
Player of the match: Mbulelo Budaza (Knights)

- Titans won the toss and elected to field.

5 March 2017
Scorecard

Lions; 294/4 (49.5 overs)	v	Knights; 234/9 (49 overs)
Reeza Hendricks 142* (144); Dillon du Preez 1/44 (10 overs)		Leus du Plooy 74 (81); Beuran Hendricks 3/40 (10 overs)

Lions won by 59 runs (D/L method)
New Wanderers Stadium, Johannesburg
Umpires: Shaun George and Adrian Holdstock
Player of the match: Reeza Hendricks (Lions)

- Knights won the toss and elected to field.

5 March 2017
Scorecard

Titans; 324/6 (50 overs)	v	Warriors; 289 (46.4 overs)
Henry Davids 66 (73); Colin Ingram 2/51 (9 overs)		JJ Smuts 85 (71); Malusi Siboto 2/33 (5 overs)

Titans won by 35 runs
Buffalo Park, East London
Umpires: Stephen Harris and Brad White
Player of the match: Heino Kuhn (Titans)

- Titans won the toss and elected to bat.

8 March 2017 (D/N)
Scorecard

Cape Cobras; 271/7 (50 overs)	v	Dolphins; 273/6 (49.1 overs)
Keegan Petersen 57 (66); Mthokozisi Shezi 2/40 (7 overs)		Vaughn van Jaarsveld 59 (70); Lizaad Williams 2/60 (8.1 overs)

Dolphins won by 4 wickets
Boland Park, Paarl
Umpires: Bongani Jele and Dennis Smith
Player of the match: Sibonelo Makhanya (Dolphins)

- Cape Cobras won the toss and elected to bat.

10 March 2017 (D/N)
Scorecard

Dolphins; 236/3 (36.4 overs)	v	Warriors
Morne van Wyk 92 (93); Colin Ackermann 2/37 (7 overs)

No result
Kingsmead, Durban
Umpires: Clifford Isaacs and Allahudien Paleker

- Dolphins won the toss and elected to bat.

10 March 2017 (D/N)
Scorecard

Lions; 188 (49.5 overs)	v	Cape Cobras; 189/4 (32.3 overs)
Nono Pongolo 47* (62); Dane Paterson 4/32 (9.5 overs)		Richard Levi 85 (60); Carmi le Roux 2/25 (4 overs)

Cape Cobras won by 6 wickets
Senwes Park, Potchefstroom
Umpires: Johan Cloete and Gerrie Pienaar
Player of the match: Richard Levi (Cape Cobras)

- Lions won the toss and elected to bat.

12 March 2017
Scorecard

Warriors; 305/6 (50 overs)	v	Cape Cobras; 215 (37.3 overs)
JJ Smuts 173* (164); Eddie Leie 4/56 (10 overs)		Richard Levi 106 (70); Colin Ingram 3/56 (10 overs)

Warriors won by 90 runs
Newlands, Cape Town
Umpires: Shaun George and Stephen Harris
Player of the match: JJ Smuts (Warriors)

- Cape Cobras won the toss and elected to field.

12 March 2017
Scorecard

Knights; 302/8 (50 overs)	v	Titans; 191 (37.2 overs)
David Miller 104 (100); David Wiese 3/53 (9 overs)		Albie Morkel 117 (84); Marchant de Lange 3/16 (7 overs)

Knights won by 111 runs
Diamond Oval, Kimberley
Umpires: Adrian Holdstock and Bongani Jele
Player of the match: David Miller (Knights)

- Titans won the toss and elected to field.

15 March 2017 (D/N)
Scorecard

Dolphins; 344/7 (50 overs)	v	Lions; 226 (42.2 overs)
Vaughn van Jaarsveld 108 (77); Reeza Hendricks 2/9 (2 overs)		Dominic Hendricks 98 (99); Imran Tahir 3/49 (10 overs)

Dolphins won by 118 runs
Senwes Park, Potchefstroom
Umpires: Murray Brown and Clifford Isaacs
Player of the match: Vaughn van Jaarsveld (Dolphins)

- Lions won the toss and elected to field.

17 March 2017 (D/N)
Scorecard

Warriors; 284/8 (50 overs)	v	Knights; 278/8 (50 overs)
JJ Smuts 132 (144); Mbulelo Budaza 4/69 (10 overs)		Aubrey Swanepoel 76* (77); Andrew Birch 3/45 (9 overs)

Warriors won by 6 runs
St George's Park, Port Elizabeth
Umpires: Adrian Holdstock and Bongani Jele
Player of the match: JJ Smuts (Warriors)

- Warriors won the toss and elected to bat.

17 March 2017 (D/N)
Scorecard

Titans; 415/3 (50 overs)	v	Lions; 246 (33.5 overs)
Aiden Markram 183 (138); Beuran Hendricks 1/71 (10 overs)		Mangaliso Mosehle 74 (44); Tabraiz Shamsi 5/74 (8.5 overs)

Titans won by 169 runs
New Wanderers Stadium, Johannesburg
Umpires: Shaun George and Allahudien Paleker
Player of the match: Aiden Markram (Titans)

- Titans won the toss and elected to bat.

19 March 2017
Scorecard

Titans; 204/8 (40 overs)	v	Dolphins; 155 (31.1 overs)
Farhaan Behardien 45 (50); Robbie Frylinck 2/40 (8 overs)		Khaya Zondo 41 (50); Shaun von Berg 4/40 (7 overs)

Titans won by 33 runs (D/L method)
Kingsmead, Durban
Umpires: Shaun George and Brad White
Player of the match: Shaun von Berg (Titans)

- Dolphins won the toss and elected to field.

19 March 2017
Scorecard

Knights; 300/5 (50 overs)	v	Cape Cobras; 152 (32 overs)
Rudi Second 104 (128); Rory Kleinveldt 3/41 (10 overs)		Dayyaan Galiem 41 (47); Diego Rosier 3/29 (6 overs)

Knights won by 148 runs
Newlands, Cape Town
Umpires: Adrian Holdstock and Bongani Jele
Player of the match: Rudi Second (Knights)

- Cape Cobras won the toss and elected to field.
- This was Knights' biggest victory in the history of the tournament.

21 March 2017
Scorecard

Warriors; 147 (41.2 overs)	v	Titans; 148/3 (28.1 overs)
Yaseen Vallie 44 (61); Chris Morris 3/30 (8 overs)		AB de Villiers 75* (62); Andrew Birch 2/37 (10 overs)

Titans won by 7 wickets
Willowmoore Park, Benoni
Umpires: Shaun George and Dennis Smith
Player of the match: Chris Morris (Titans)

- Warriors won the toss and elected to bat.

21 March 2017
Scorecard

Knights; 311/6 (50 overs)	v	Lions; 307/6 (50 overs)
David Miller 123* (86); Ayavuya Myoli 2/48 (7 overs)		Dwaine Pretorius 115 (79); Aubrey Swanepoel 2/44 (10 overs)

Knights won by 4 runs
Diamond Oval, Kimberley
Umpires: Johan Cloete and Adrian Holdstock
Player of the match: David Miller (Knights)

- Knights won the toss and elected to bat.

23 March 2017 (D/N)
Scorecard

Lions; 154 (43.2 overs)	v	Warriors; 123/4 (32 overs)
Mangaliso Mosehle 39 (47); JJ Smuts 4/25 (10 overs)		JJ Smuts 51 (57); Wihan Lubbe 3/25 (8 overs)

Warriors won by 36 runs (D/L method)
St George's Park, Port Elizabeth
Umpires: Lubabalo Gcuma and Dennis Smith
Player of the match: JJ Smuts (Warriors)

- Lions won the toss and elected to bat.

23 March 2017 (D/N)
Scorecard

Dolphins; 204 (49.4 overs)	v	Knights; 207/9 (49.2 overs)
Sarel Erwee 44 (80); Dillon du Preez 4/31 (9.4 overs)		Pite van Biljon 44 (64); Imran Tahir 4/31 (10 overs)

Knights won by 1 wicket
Kingsmead, Durban
Umpires: Adrian Holdstock and Bongani Jele
Player of the match: Dillon du Preez (Knights)

- Dolphins won the toss and elected to bat.

23 March 2017 (D/N)
Scorecard

Cape Cobras; 184 (44.5 overs)	v	Titans; 185/4 (31.3 overs)
Aviwe Mgijima 52 (96); Lungi Ngidi 2/20 (8 overs)		Jonathan Vandiar 72 (78); Eddie Leie 3/54 (10 overs)

Titans won by 6 wickets
Centurion Park, Centurion
Umpires: Allahudien Paleker and Brad White
Player of the match: Jonathan Vandiar (Titans)

- Titans won the toss and elected to field.

=== Finals ===
Qualifier
26 March 2017
Scorecard

Warriors; 88/3 (28 overs)	v	Knights
Gihahn Cloete 30 (77); Dillon du Preez 2/11 (7 overs)

No result
Mangaung Oval, Bloemfontein
Umpires: Adrian Holdstock and Allahudien Paleker

- Warriors won the toss and elected to bat.
- The match was abandoned due to concerns with the playing surface, with the match restarted the following day.

Qualifier
27 March 2017
Scorecard

Warriors; 249/7 (50 overs)	v	Knights; 231/6 (50 overs)
Colin Ingram 83 (97); Marchant de Lange 2/35 (10 overs)		Keegan Petersen 83 (117); Anrich Nortje 2/33 (7 overs)

Warriors won by 18 runs
Mangaung Oval, Bloemfontein
Umpires: Adrian Holdstock and Allahudien Paleker
Player of the match: Colin Ingram (Warriors)

- Warriors won the toss and elected to bat.

Final
31 March 2017 (D/N)
Scorecard

Titans; 425/5 (50 overs)	v	Warriors; 189 (31 overs)
Aiden Markram 161 (123); Anrich Nortje 2/62 (6 overs)		Jerry Nqolo 40 (47); Tabraiz Shamsi 3/31 (9 overs)

Titans won by 236 runs
Centurion Park, Centurion
Umpires: Shaun George and Bongani Jele
Player of the match: Aiden Markram (Titans)

- Titans won the toss and elected to bat.
