= 2015–16 Momentum One Day Cup =

- Dates: 9 October 2015 – 28 February 2016
- Administrator(s): Cricket South Africa
- Cricket format: List A
- Tournament format(s): Double round-robin and playoffs
- Champions: Lions
- Participants: 6
- Most runs: Alviro Petersen (Lions) 726
- Most wickets: Malusi Siboto (Knights) 19

The 2015–16 Momentum One Day Cup was a domestic one-day cricket championship in South Africa. It was the 35th time the championship was contested. The competition started on 9 October 2015 and the final took place on 28 February 2016. The Lions won the final against the Cape Cobras by 8 wickets

== Group stage ==
9 October 2015
Scorecard

Titans; 327/4 (50 overs)	v	Warriors; 329/8 (49.5 overs)
Grant Thomson 98 * (71); Simon Harmer 2/54 (10 overs)		JJ Smuts 101 (74); Junior Dala 3/69 (10 overs)

Warriors won by 2 wickets
SuperSport Park, Centurion
Umpires: Shaun George and Adrian Holdstock
Player of the match: JJ Smuts

- Warriors won the toss and elected to field.

10 October 2015
Scorecard

Cape Cobras; 270/5 (50 overs)	v	Lions; 271/2 (44.2 overs)
Omphile Ramela 59 (97); Bjorn Fortuin 1/43 (10 overs)		Stephen Cook 127 * (131); Vernon Philander 1/37 (8 overs)

Lions won by 8 wickets
New Wanderers Stadium, Johannesburg
Umpires: Shaun George and Bongami Jele
Player of the match: Stephen Cook

- Lions won the toss and elected to field.

11 October 2015
Scorecard

Dolphins; 246 (49.3 overs)	v	Knights; 170 (46.1 overs)
Vaughn van Jaarsveld 82 (112); Werner Coetsee 2/32 (10 overs)		Reeza Hendricks 38 (67); Robert Frylinck 3/22 (9.1 overs)

Dolphins won by 76 runs
City Oval, Pietermaritzburg
Umpires: Allahudien Paleker and Brad White
Player of the match: Vaughn van Jaarsveld

- Dolphins won the toss and elected to bat.

14 October 2015
Scorecard

Warriors; 276/7 (50 overs)	v	Dolphins; 230 (40.1 overs)
Yaseen Valli 96 (78); Ryan McLaren 2/53 (10 overs)		Robert Frylinck 56 (51); JJ Smuts 3/47 (10 overs)

Warriors won by 42 runs (D/L Method)
St George's Park, Port Elizabeth
Umpires: Lubabalo Gcuma and Dennis Smith
Player of the match: Yaseen Vallie

- Warriors won the toss and elected to bat.

16 October 2015
Scorecard

Titans; 263/9 (50 overs)	v	Cape Cobras; 282/9 (50 overs)
Dean Elgar 86 (91); Wayne Parnell 3/64 (10 overs)		Dane Vilas 78 (90); Marchant de Lange 4/58 (10 overs)

Cape Cobras won by 19 runs
Newlands, Cape Town
Umpires: Johan Cloete and Adrian Holdstock
Player of the match: Dane Vilas

- Cape Cobras won the toss and elected to bat.

16 October 2015
Scorecard

Lions; 221/6 (50 overs)	v	Dolphins; 222/6 (44.2 overs)
Alviro Petersen 108 * (117); Ryan McLaren 3/48 (10 overs)		Cody Chetty 86 * (100); Eddie Leie 2/43 (9.2 overs)

Dolphins won by 4 wickets
Kingsmead, Durban
Umpires: Lubabalo Gcuma and Brad White
Player of the match: Cody Chetty

- Lions won the toss and elected to bat.

16 October 2015
Scorecard

Knights; 252/5 (50 overs)	v	Warriors; 239/5 (50 overs)
Rudi Second 135 * (146); Sisanda Magala 2/41 (10 overs)		Colin Ingram 120 (135); Shadley van Schalkwyk 2/30 (10 overs)

Knights won by 13 runs
Mangaung Oval, Bloemfontein
Umpires: Bongami Jele and Allahudien Paleker
Player of the match: Rudi Second

- Knights won the toss and elected to bat.

18 October 2015
8th match
Scorecard

Knights; 211/7 (50 overs)	v	Cape Cobras; 212/2 (38.1 overs)
Obus Pienaar 73 * (99); Wayne Parnell 4/40 (10 overs)		Stiaan van Zyl 90 * (109); Malusi Siboto 1/34 (7 overs)

Cape Cobras won by 8 wickets
Boland Park, Paarl
Umpires: Johan Cloete and Clifford Isaacs
Player of the match: Stiaan van Zyl

- Knights won the toss and elected to bat.

18 October 2015
Scorecard

Lions; 271/8 (50 overs)	v	Titans; 273/2 (39.1 overs)
Alviro Petersen 108 (96); Marchant de Lange 3/53 (10 overs)		Heino Kuhn 119 (83); Dwaine Pretorius 1/52 (8 overs)

Titans won by 8 wickets
New Wanderers Stadium, Johannesburg
Umpires: Shaun George and Stephen Harris
Player of the match: Heino Kuhn

- Titans won the toss and elected to field.

21 October 2015
Scorecard

Dolphins; 171 (32.2 overs)	v	Titans; 177/3 (27.1 overs)
Vaughn van Jaarsveld 66 (73); Henry Davids 3/30 (7 overs)		Heino Kuhn 63 * (68); Robert Frylinck 1/23 (5 overs)

Titans won by 7 wickets (D/L method)
SuperSport Park, Centurion
Umpires: Bongami Jele and Dennis Smith
Player of the match: Henry Davids

- Titans won the toss and elected to field.

23 October 2015
Scorecard

Cape Cobras; 235/8 (50 overs)	v	Dolphins; 171 (45.4 overs)
Andrew Puttick 68 (104); Craig Alexander 3/41 (10 overs)		Robert Frylinck 72 (80); Rory Kleinveldt 2/22 (8 overs)

Cape Cobras won by 64 runs
Kingsmead, Durban
Umpires: Bongami Jele and Brad White
Player of the match: Rory Kleinveldt

- Cape Cobras won the toss and elected to bat.

23 October 2015
Scorecard

Titans; 242 (48.2 overs)	v	Knights; 243/7 (48 overs)
Heino Kuhn 55 (56); Malusi Siboto 3/43 (9 overs)		Rudi Second 83 (123); Albie Morkel 1/25 (8 overs)

Knights won by 3 wickets
Diamond Oval, Kimberley
Umpires: Johan Cloete and Adrian Holdstock
Player of the match: Rudi Second

- Knights won the toss and elected to field.

23 October 2015
Scorecard

Warriors; 139/3 (28.3 overs)	v	Lions
Colin Ingram 55 * (52); Dwaine Pretorius 1/32 (5 overs)

No result
Buffalo Park, East London
Umpires: Shaun George and Stephen Harris

- Warriors won the toss and elected to bat.
- After 27.1 overs of the Warriors' innings, rain reduced the match to 33 overs per side. Rain then caused the match to be abandoned.

25 October 2015
Scorecard

Cape Cobras; 250/9 (50 overs)	v	Warriors; 253/5 (48.5 overs)
Justin Ontong 77 (98); Sisanda Magala 5/40 (9 overs)		Colin Ingram 70 (82); Robin Peterson 2/48 (10 overs)

Warriors won by 5 wickets
Newlands, Cape Town
Umpires: Murray Brown and Clifford Isaacs
Player of the match: Sisanda Magala

- Warriors won the toss and elected to field.

25 October 2015
Scorecard

Lions; 317/6 (50 overs)	v	Knights; 133 (34.5 overs)
Alviro Petersen 134 (128); Malusi Siboto 3/63 (10 overs)		Diego Rosier 40 (49); Eddie Leie 5/30 (8.5 overs)

Lions won by 184 runs
Senwes Park, Potchefstroom
Umpires: Johan Cloete and Allahudien Paleker
Player of the match: Alviro Petersen

- Knights won the toss and elected to field.

29 January 2016
Scorecard

Cape Cobras; 265/7 (50 overs)	v	Dolphins; 197 (44.4 overs)
Andrew Puttick 79 (95); Ayavuya Myoli 3/40 (10 overs)		Ryan McLaren 52 (55); Jean-Paul Duminy 2/19 (3.4 overs)

Cape Cobras won by 68 runs
Newlands, Cape Town
Umpires: J Cloete and Allahudien Paleker
Player of the match: Jean-Paul Duminy

- Cape Cobras won the toss and elected to bat.

29 January 2016
Scorecard

Lions; 256 (50 overs)	v	Warriors; 252/8 (50 overs)
Stephen Cook 112 (127); Sisanda Magala 5/43 (10 overs)		Colin Ingram 60 (79); Pumelela Matshikwe 2/43 (10 overs)

Lions won by 4 runs
New Wanderers Stadium, Johannesburg
Umpires: Lubabalo Gcuma and Dennis Smith
Player of the match: Stephen Cook

- Warriors won the toss and elected to field.

29 January 2016
Scorecard

Titans; 301/7 (50 overs)	v	Knights; 246 (46.3 overs)
Faf du Plessis 72 (84); Malusi Siboto 2/49 (9 overs)		Rilee Rossouw 62 (52); Chris Morris 3/30 (8.3 overs)

Titans won by 55 runs
Willowmoore Park, Benoni
Umpires: Lubabalo Gcuma and Dennis Smith
Player of the match: Chris Morris

- Knights won the toss and elected to field.

31 January 2016
Scorecard

Warriors; 285 (49.1 overs)	v	Titans; 271 (49.3 overs)
Colin Ingram 97 * (99); Henry Davids 3/39 (7 overs)		Grant Thomson 79 (87); Basheeru-Deen Walters 3/70 (9.3 overs)

Warriors won by 14 runs
Buffalo Park, East London
Umpires: Clifford Isaacs and Brad White
Player of the match: Colin Ingram

- Warriors won the toss and elected to bat.

2 February 2016
Scorecard

Dolphins; 290/8 (50 overs)	v	Knights; 111 (18.3/20 overs, target 158)
Cody Chetty 69 (87); Shadley van Schalkwyk 3/52 (10 overs)		Shadley van Schalkwyk 34 (20); Khaya Zondo 3/12 (2.3 overs)

Dolphins won by 46 runs (D/L method)
Diamond Oval, Kimberley
Umpires: Clifford Isaacs and Bongani Jele
Player of the match: Khaya Zondo

- Dolphins won the toss and elected to bat.

5 February 2016
Scorecard

Lions; 276/7 (50 overs)	v	Dolphins; 268/7 (50 overs)
Alviro Petersen 107 (92); Ryan McLaren 3/46 (10 overs)		Ryan McLaren 62 (89); Matt McGillivray 4/49 (10 overs)

Lions won by 8 runs
Senwes Park, Potchefstroom
Umpires: Stephen Harris and Bongani Jele
Player of the match: Alviro Petersen

- Dolphins won the toss and elected to field.

5 February 2016
Scorecard

Cape Cobras; 237/5 (42 overs)	v	Titans; 133 (30.4 overs)
Justin Ontong 65 (53); Junior Dala 2/45 (8 overs)		Graeme van Buuren 40 (36); Beuran Hendricks 5/31 (7.4 overs)

Cape Cobras won by 113 runs (D/L method)
Willowmoore Park, Benoni
Umpires: Lubabalo Gcuma and Dennis Smith
Player of the match: Beuran Hendricks

- Titans won the toss and elected to field.

7 February 2016
Scorecard

Lions; 133 (40.1 overs)	v	Cape Cobras; 137/4 (33.1 overs)
Dominic Hendricks 44* (83); Beuran Hendricks 3/18 (8 overs)		Andrew Puttick 63* (86); Pumelela Matshikwe 1/21 (8 overs)

Cape Cobras won by 6 wickets
Boland Park, Paarl
Umpires: Stephen Harris and Bongani Jele
Player of the match: Beuran Hendricks

- Cape Cobras won the toss and elected to field.

7 February 2016
Scorecard

Knights; 258/6 (50 overs)	v	Warriors; 184 (43.3 overs)
Rudi Second 110* (149); JJ Smuts 2/49 (10 overs)		JJ Smuts 53 (70); Mbulelo Budaza 3/20 (6 overs)

Knights won by 74 runs
Buffalo Park, East London
Umpires: Murray Brown and Clifford Isaacs
Player of the match: Rudi Second

- Knights won the toss and elected to bat.

10 February 2016
25th match
Scorecard

Dolphins; 110 (28.3 overs)	v	Warriors; 111/1 (23.5 overs)
Keshav Maharaj 43* (41); Andrew Birch 4/15 (10 overs)		Colin Ackermann 59* (83); Andile Phehlukwayo 1/18 (5 overs)

Warriors won by 9 wickets
Kingsmead, Durban
Umpires: Bongani Jele and Brad White
Player of the match: Andrew Birch

- Dolphins win the toss and elected to bat.

13 February 2016
Scorecard

Knights; 169 (38.3 overs)	v	Lions; 170/6 (39.5 overs)
Reeza Hendricks 41 (41); Eddie Leie 3/43 (10 overs)		Stephen Cook 64 (96); Shadley van Schalkwyk 2/29 (6.5 overs)

Lions won by 4 wickets
Mangaung Oval, Bloemfontein
Umpires: Bongani Jele and Allahudien Paleker
Player of the match: Stephen Cook

- Lions won the toss and elected to field.

13 February 2016
Scorecard

Warriors; 256/8 (50 overs)	v	Cape Cobras; 257/5 (47.3 overs)
Colin Ackermann 92 (125); Dane Paterson 3/54 (10 overs)		Dane Vilas 105* (70); Colin Ackermann 2/34 (10 overs)

Cape Cobras won by 5 wickets
St George's Park, Port Elizabeth
Umpires: Bongani Jele & Allahudien Paleker
Player of the match: Dane Vilas

- Warriors won the toss and elected to bat.

13 February 2016
Scorecard

Dolphins; 315/6 (50 overs)	v	Titans; 281 (47.4 overs)
Sarel Erwee 113 (128); Junior Dala 3/58 (10 overs)		Dean Elgar 57 (64); Andile Phehlukwayo 6/27 (8.4 overs)

Dolphins won by 34 runs
Kingsmead, Durban
Umpires: Murray Brown & Clifford Isaacs
Player of the match: Andile Phehlukwayo

- Titans won the toss and elected to field.

16 February 2016
Scorecard

Knights; 279/5 (50 overs)	v	Cape Cobras; 166 (42.5 overs)
Rudi Second 111* (143); Tshepo Moreki 3/45 (8 overs)		Stiaan van Zyl 70* (91); Malusi Siboto 4/32 (8.5 overs)

Knights won by 113 runs
Mangaung Oval, Bloemfontein
Umpires: Clifford Isaacs & Gerrie Pienaar
Player of the match: Rudi Second

- Knights won the toss and elected to bat.

17 February 2016
Scorecard

Titans; 240/6 (35 overs)	v	Lions; 74/1 (10.1 overs)
Qaasim Adams 50 (21); Pumelela Matshikwe 2/44 (7 overs)		Alviro Petersen 37* (34); Albie Morkel 1/22 (3 overs)

No result
SuperSport Park, Centurion
Umpires: Murray Brown and Clifford Isaacs

- Lions won the toss and elected to field.

=== Points table ===
Pos	Team	Pld	W	L	NR	BP	Ded	Pts	NRR
1	Cape Cobras (R)	10	7	3	0	5	0	33	0.568
2	Lions (W)	10	5	3	2	2	0	26	0.283
3	Warriors (3)	10	5	4	1	1	0	23	0.224
4	Knights	10	4	6	0	2	0	18	−0.559
5	Dolphins	10	4	6	0	2	2	16	−0.408
6	Titans	10	3	6	1	2	1	15	−0.045

RESULT POINTS:

- Win – 4
- Tie – 2 each
- No Result – 2 each
- Loss – 0

== Knockout stage ==
Of the 6 participants, the following 3 teams qualified for the knockout stage:

Semifinal			Final
			1	Cape Cobras	169
2	Lions	174/2	2	Lions	171/2
3	Warriors	202/8

=== Semi-final ===
24 February 2016
Scorecard

Warriors; 202/8 (41 overs)	v	Lions; 174/2 (29 overs)
Jerry Nqolo 63 (68); Dwaine Pretorius 2/23 (8 overs)		Rassie van der Dussen 83* (89); Andrew Birch 2/34 (7 overs)

Lions won by 8 wickets (D/L method)
New Wanderers Stadium, Johannesburg
Umpires: J Cloete and S George

- Lions won the toss and chose to field.
- Match was reduced to 32 overs, with a revised target for the Lions of 174.

=== Final ===
28 February 2016
Scorecard

Cape Cobras; 169 (42 overs)	v	Lions; 171/2 (33.4 overs)
Justin Ontong 60 (77); Pumelela Matshikwe 3/28 (8 overs)		Stephen Cook 77* (94); Wayne Parnell 2/36 (8 overs)

Lions won by 8 wickets
Newlands, Cape Town
Umpires: Adrian Holdstock and Bongani Jele
Player of the match: Stephen Cook

- Lions won the toss and chose to field.

== Statistics ==
=== Most Runs ===
Player	Team	Runs	Matches	I	NO	Highest score	Avg	Balls faced	Strike rate	100s	50s	0s	Fours	Sixes
Alviro Petersen	(South Africa) Lions	726	12	11	2	134	80.66	725	100.13	5	1	0	74	13
Stephen Cook	(South Africa) Lions	504	12	11	2	127*	56.09	658	76.59	2	2	1	49	1
Rudi Second	(South Africa) Knights	498	10	10	3	135*	71.14	674	73.88	3	1	2	31	0
Colin Ingram	(South Africa) Warriors	480	10	10	3	120	68.57	551	87.11	1	5	0	50	8
Justin Ontong	(South Africa) Cape Cobras	439	10	10	2	77	54.87	529	82.98	0	4	0	32	3

=== Most Wickets ===
Player	Team	Wickets	Matches	Overs	Maidens	Runs	Best Figures	Avg	Econ	SR	5W
Malusi Siboto	(South Africa) Knights	19	10	88.2	4	442	4/32	23.26	5.00	27.8	0
Andrew Birch	(South Africa) Warriors	17	9	72.1	14	342	4/15	20.11	4.73	25.4	0
Wayne Parnell	(South Africa) Cape Cobras	16	9	76.1	3	368	4/40	23.00	4.83	28.5	0
Junior Dala	(South Africa) Titans	16	10	70.0	3	424	3/58	26.50	6.05	26.2	0
Tshepo Moreki	(South Africa) Cape Cobras	15	11	87.0	5	426	3/26	28.40	4.89	34.8	0
