= English cricket team in South Africa in 2015–16 =

International cricket tour

	South Africa	England
- Dates: 15 December 2015 – 21 February 2016
Captains	Hashim Amla (Tests) (Note: AB de Villiers captained South Africa for the last two Test matches.); AB de Villiers (ODIs); Faf du Plessis (T20Is)	Alastair Cook (Tests); Eoin Morgan (ODIs and T20Is)

Test series
- Result: England won the 4-match series 2–1
Most runs	Hashim Amla (470)	Ben Stokes (411)
Most wickets	Kagiso Rabada (22)	Stuart Broad (18)
- Player of the series: Ben Stokes (Eng)

One Day International series
- Results: South Africa won the 5-match series 3–2
Most runs	Quinton de Kock (326)	Alex Hales (383)
Most wickets	Kagiso Rabada (9)	Reece Topley (10)
- Player of the series: Alex Hales (Eng)

Twenty20 International series
- Results: South Africa won the 2-match series 2–0
Most runs	Hashim Amla (91)	Jos Buttler (86)
Most wickets	Imran Tahir (5); Kyle Abbott (5)	Chris Jordan (3)
- Player of the series: Imran Tahir (SA)

The England cricket team toured South Africa from 15 December 2015 to 21 February 2016. The tour consisted of four Test matches, five One Day International and two Twenty20 International matches. England won the Test series 2–1. South Africa won the ODI series 3–2 and the T20I series 2–0.

== Squads ==
Tests		ODIs		T20Is	
South Africa	England	South Africa	England	South Africa	England
Hashim Amla (c); AB de Villiers (c, wk); Kyle Abbott; Temba Bavuma; Stephen Cook; JP Duminy; Faf du Plessis; Dean Elgar; Quinton de Kock (wk); Morne Morkel; Chris Morris; Dane Piedt; Kagiso Rabada; Rilee Rossouw; ~~Dale Steyn~~; Dane Vilas (wk); Hardus Viljoen; Stiaan van Zyl	Alastair Cook (c); Moeen Ali; James Anderson; Jonny Bairstow (wk); Gary Ballance; Stuart Broad; Jos Buttler (wk); Nick Compton; Steven Finn; Mark Footitt; Alex Hales; Chris Jordan; Samit Patel; Joe Root; Ben Stokes; James Taylor; Chris Woakes	AB de Villiers (c); Kyle Abbott; Hashim Amla; Farhaan Behardien; Quinton de Kock (wk); JP Duminy; Marchant de Lange; Faf du Plessis; David Miller; Morne Morkel; Chris Morris; Kagiso Rabada; Rilee Rossouw; ~~Dale Steyn~~; Imran Tahir	Eoin Morgan (c); Moeen Ali; Jonny Bairstow (wk); Stuart Broad; Jos Buttler (wk); ~~Steven Finn~~; Alex Hales; Chris Jordan; ~~Liam Plunkett~~; Adil Rashid; Joe Root; Jason Roy; Ben Stokes; James Taylor; Reece Topley; David Willey; Chris Woakes	Faf du Plessis (c); Kyle Abbott; Hashim Amla; Farhaan Behardien; ~~Quinton de Kock (wk)~~; AB de Villiers (wk); JP Duminy; Imran Tahir; David Miller; Chris Morris; Aaron Phangiso; Kagiso Rabada; Rilee Rossouw; Dale Steyn; David Wiese	Eoin Morgan (c); Moeen Ali; Sam Billings (wk); Jos Buttler (wk); ~~Steven Finn~~; Alex Hales; Chris Jordan; Liam Plunkett; Adil Rashid; Joe Root; Jason Roy; Ben Stokes; Reece Topley; David Willey; Chris Woakes; James Vince

Steven Finn was added to England's Test squad on 14 December 2015. Following the conclusion of the first Test, Quinton de Kock and Chris Morris were added to the South African squad. South Africa later added Hardus Viljoen to their squad as cover for Kyle Abbott. Hashim Amla resigned from the captaincy at the end of the second Test with AB de Villiers replacing him for the rest of the series. Dale Steyn only played in the first Test and was ruled out of the rest of the series with a shoulder injury. Dane Vilas was added to South Africa's Test squad as a late replacement for Quinton de Kock, who suffered a knee injury. Vilas was due to play in the Sunfoil Series and had to catch a flight from Port Elizabeth to Johannesburg on the morning of the third Test. Stephen Cook was added to South Africa's squad ahead of the fourth Test, with Rilee Rossouw being released to play in the Sunfoil Series.

Liam Plunkett was added to England's limited-overs squad as replacement for Finn, who suffered a side strain during the 3rd Test. However, Plunkett would later suffer from injury too, and was replaced by Stuart Broad. Dale Steyn was ruled out of the ODI series with a shoulder injury. Marchant de Lange was added to South Africa's ODI squad.

Quinton de Kock was selected for the T20I series, but was rested for both games. AB de Villiers kept wicket for South Africa in his absence.

== Tour matches ==
=== Three-day: South African Invitation XI v England XI ===
15–17 December 2015
Scorecard

England XI	v	South African Invitation XI
470/7d (88 overs); Ben Stokes 158* (131); Thandolwethu Mnyaka 3/66 (18 overs)		188 (57.1 overs); Heinrich Klaasen 48 (53); Stuart Broad 3/18 (6.1 overs)
190 (52.4 overs); Joe Root 39 (65); Junior Dala 5/34 (12 overs)		5/0 (2 overs); Simon Khomari 5* (6)

Match drawn
Senwes Park, Potchefstroom
Umpires: Shaun George (SA) and Bongani Jele (SA)

- England XI won the toss and elected to bat.
- 13 players per side (11 batting, 11 fielding).

=== First-class: South Africa A v England XI ===
20–22 December 2015
Scorecard

South Africa A	v	England XI
136 (56 overs); Stephen Cook 53* (170); Steven Finn 4/34 (12 overs)		414/6d (97.5 overs); Alastair Cook 126 (194); Keshav Maharaj 4/129 (26.5 overs)
187 (42.5 overs); Quinton de Kock 53 (64); Moeen Ali 6/77 (14.5 overs)

England XI won by an innings and 91 runs
City Oval, Pietermaritzburg
Umpires: Shaun George (SA) and Bongani Jele (SA)

- England XI won the toss and elected to field.

=== List A: South Africa A v England XI ===
30 January 2016
13:30 (D/N)
Scorecard

England XI; 368/7 (50 overs)	v	South Africa A 205 (30.5 overs)
James Taylor 116 (116); Marchant de Lange 2/69 (10 overs)		Theunis de Bruyn 73* (82); Reece Topley 3/38 (5.5 overs)

England XI won by 163 runs
Diamond Oval, Kimberley
Umpires: Johan Cloete (SA) and Shaun George (SA)

- England XI won the toss and elected to bat.

=== T20: South Africa A v England XI ===
17 February 2016
18:00 (D/N)
Scorecard

England XI; 202/6 (20 overs)	v	South Africa A 158/8 (20 overs)
Alex Hales 78 (52); Wayne Parnell 3/26 (4 overs)		Theunis de Bruyn 56 (38); Reece Topley 3/29 (4 overs)

England XI won by 44 runs
Boland Park, Paarl
Umpires: Shaun George (SA) and Bongani Jele (SA)

- England XI won the toss and elected to bat.

== Test series ==
=== 1st Test ===
26–30 December 2015
Scorecard

England	v	South Africa
303 (100.1 overs); Nick Compton 85 (236); Dale Steyn 4/70 (25.1 overs)		214 (81.4 overs); Dean Elgar 118* (246); Stuart Broad 4/25 (15 overs)
326 (102.1 overs); Jonny Bairstow 79 (76); Dane Piedt 5/153 (36 overs)		174 (71 overs); Dean Elgar 40 (71); Steven Finn 4/42 (15 overs)

England won by 241 runs
Kingsmead, Durban
Umpires: Aleem Dar (Pak) and Rod Tucker (Aus)
Player of the match: Moeen Ali (Eng)

- South Africa won the toss and elected to field.
- Rain stopped play at 11:05 on Day 1 and lunch was taken. Bad light stopped play at 17.56 on Day 1 and play ended for the day.
- Alex Hales (Eng) made his Test debut.
- Dean Elgar became the first South African to carry his bat in a Test innings since Gary Kirsten in 1997.

=== 2nd Test ===
2–6 January 2016
Scorecard

England	v	South Africa
629/6d (125.5 overs); Ben Stokes 258 (198); Kagiso Rabada 3/175 (29.5 overs)		627/7d (211 overs); Hashim Amla 201 (477); Stuart Broad 2/94 (34 overs)
159/6 (65 overs); Jonny Bairstow 30* (75); Dane Piedt 3/38 (18 overs)

Match drawn
Newlands, Cape Town
Umpires: Aleem Dar (Pak) and Bruce Oxenford (Aus)
Player of the match: Ben Stokes (Eng)

- England won the toss and elected to bat.
- Bad light stopped play at 15:46 on Day 5, with no further play possible.
- Chris Morris (SA) made his Test debut.
- Aleem Dar (Pak) stood in his 100th Test match as an umpire.
- Ben Stokes became the first England player batting at number 6 to make a double century in Test cricket. He also scored the second-fastest double century, the fastest by an Englishman and the fastest ever 250 in Tests.
- Ben Stokes and Jonny Bairstow's 399-run partnership is the highest 6th-wicket partnership in Test cricket, England's second-highest partnership for any wicket and the highest partnership in South Africa for any wicket.
- Temba Bavuma became the first black African to score a century in Test cricket for South Africa.
- This is the first time that both teams scored more than 600 runs in their first innings of a Test in South Africa.
- Hashim Amla (SA) resigned from the captaincy at the end of the Test with AB de Villiers replacing him for the rest of the series.

=== 3rd Test ===
14–18 January 2016
Scorecard

South Africa	v	England
313 (99.3 overs); Dean Elgar 46 (122); Ben Stokes 3/53 (18.1 overs)		323 (76.1 overs); Joe Root 110 (139); Kagiso Rabada 5/78 (23.1 overs)
83 (33.1 overs); Kagiso Rabada 16 (21); Stuart Broad 6/17 (12.1 overs)		74/3 (22.4 overs); Alastair Cook 43 (70); Dean Elgar 2/10 (3.4 overs)

England won by 7 wickets
Wanderers Stadium, Johannesburg
Umpires: Aleem Dar (Pak) and Rod Tucker (Aus)
Player of the match: Stuart Broad (Eng)

- South Africa won the toss and elected to bat.
- Bad light stopped play at 16:47 on Day 2, with no further play possible.
- Hardus Viljoen (SA) made his Test debut.
- Kagiso Rabada (SA) took his first five-wicket haul in Test cricket.
- With victory in this match England won the Basil D'Oliveira Trophy.
- South Africa's 2nd innings total of 83 all out is their lowest home total since being readmitted to Test cricket.
- With this defeat, South Africa lost their number one place in the Test rankings, dropping to third place behind India and Australia.
- Following his man of the match performance, Stuart Broad (Eng) became the number one ranked Test bowler in the ICC Player Rankings.

=== 4th Test ===
22–26 January 2016
Scorecard

South Africa	v	England
475 (132 overs); Quinton de Kock 129* (128); Ben Stokes 4/86 (27 overs)		342 (104.2 overs); Joe Root 76 (128); Kagiso Rabada 7/112 (29 overs)
248/5d (83.2 overs); Hashim Amla 96 (199); James Anderson 3/47 (18 overs)		101 (34.4 overs); James Taylor 24 (48); Kagiso Rabada 6/32 (10.4 overs)

South Africa won by 280 runs
Centurion Park, Centurion
Umpires: Kumar Dharmasena (SL) and Chris Gaffaney (NZ)
Player of the match: Kagiso Rabada (SA)

- South Africa won the toss and elected to bat.
- Rain delayed play for 45 minutes after lunch on Day 3.
- Rain stopped play at 16:00 on Day 4 with play resuming at 17:10.
- Stephen Cook (SA) made his Test debut.
- Stephen Cook became the 100th player to score a century on debut in a Test match.
- Quinton de Kock (SA) scored his maiden Test century.

== ODI series ==
=== 1st ODI ===
3 February 2016
13:30 (D/N)
Scorecard

England; 399/9 (50 overs)	v	South Africa; 250/5 (33.3 overs)
Jos Buttler 105 (76); Chris Morris 3/74 (10 overs)		Quinton de Kock 138* (96); Moeen Ali 3/43 (6 overs)

England won by 39 runs (DLS method)
Mangaung Oval, Bloemfontein
Umpires: Chris Gaffaney (NZ) and Shaun George (SA)
Player of the match: Quinton de Kock (SA)

- England won the toss and elected to bat.
- Rain stopped play in the 34th over of South Africa's innings with no further play possible.

=== 2nd ODI ===
6 February 2016
10:00
Scorecard

South Africa; 262/7 (50 overs)	v	England; 263/5 (46.2 overs)
AB de Villiers 73 (91); Reece Topley 4/50 (9 overs)		Alex Hales 99 (124); Kyle Abbott 3/58 (9 overs)

England won by 5 wickets
St. George's Park, Port Elizabeth
Umpires: Johan Cloete (SA) and Kumar Dharmasena (SL)
Player of the match: Alex Hales (Eng)

- South Africa won the toss and elected to bat.
- Alex Hales became the first batsmen to be dismissed for 99 in an ODI and a T20I.

=== 3rd ODI ===
9 February 2016
13:30 (D/N)
Scorecard

England; 318/8 (50 overs)	v	South Africa; 319/3 (46.2 overs)
Joe Root 125 (113); Kyle Abbott 2/50 (10 overs)		Quinton de Kock 135 (117); Adil Rashid 1/45 (10 overs)

South Africa won by 7 wickets
Centurion Park, Centurion
Umpires: Johan Cloete (SA) and Chris Gaffaney (NZ)
Player of the match: Quinton de Kock (SA)

- England won the toss and elected to bat.
- This was the highest successful run-chase in an ODI at this venue.
- Quinton de Kock (SA) became the youngest player to make 10 centuries in ODI matches.
- Quinton de Kock and Hashim Amla's 239-run partnership is the highest partnership for South Africa when batting second in an ODI.

=== 4th ODI ===
12 February 2016
13:30 (D/N)
Scorecard

England; 262 (47.5 overs)	v	South Africa; 266/9 (47.2 overs)
Joe Root 109 (124); Kagiso Rabada 4/45 (9.5 overs)		Chris Morris 62 (38); Adil Rashid 2/38 (5.2 overs)

South Africa won by 1 wicket
Wanderers Stadium, Johannesburg
Umpires: Kumar Dharmasena (SL) and Shaun George (SA)
Player of the match: Chris Morris (SA)

- South Africa won the toss and elected to field.

=== 5th ODI ===
14 February 2016
10:00
Scorecard

England; 236 (45 overs)	v	South Africa; 237/5 (44 overs)
Alex Hales 112 (128); Kagiso Rabada 3/34 (9 overs)		AB de Villiers 101* (97); Reece Topley 3/41 (7 overs)

South Africa won by 5 wickets
Newlands, Cape Town
Umpires: Johan Cloete (SA) and Chris Gaffaney (NZ)
Player of the match: AB de Villiers (SA)

- South Africa won the toss and elected to field.
- AB de Villiers (SA) played his 200th ODI.

== T20I series ==
=== 1st T20I ===
19 February 2016
18:00 (D/N)
Scorecard

England; 134/8 (20 overs)	v	South Africa; 135/7 (20 overs)
Jos Buttler 32* (30); Imran Tahir 4/21 (4 overs)		Faf du Plessis 25 (30); Chris Jordan 3/23 (4 overs)

South Africa won by 3 wickets
Newlands, Cape Town
Umpires: Johan Cloete (SA) and Shaun George (SA)
Player of the match: Imran Tahir (SA)

- South Africa won the toss and elected to field.

=== 2nd T20I ===
21 February 2016
14:30
Scorecard

England; 171 (19.4 overs)	v	South Africa; 172/1 (14.4 overs)
Jos Buttler 54 (28); Kyle Abbott 3/26 (4 overs)		AB de Villiers 71 (29); Adil Rashid 1/30 (4 overs)

South Africa won by 9 wickets
Wanderers Stadium, Johannesburg
Umpires: Johan Cloete (SA) and Adrian Holdstock (SA)
Player of the match: AB de Villiers (SA)

- South Africa won the toss and elected to field.
- AB de Villiers scored the fastest 50 (21 balls) for South Africa in a T20I.
