= Nandre Burger =

South African international cricketer (born 1995)

Personal information
- Born: 11 August 1995 (age 31); Krugersdorp, Gauteng, South Africa
- Height: 1.88 m (6 ft 2 in)
- Batting: Left-handed
- Bowling: Left-arm fast-medium
- Role: Bowler

International information
- National side: South Africa (2023–present)
- Test debut (cap 358): 26 December 2023 v India
- Last Test: 15 August 2024 v West Indies
- ODI debut (cap 149): 17 December 2023 v India
- Last ODI: 20 September 2024 v Afghanistan
- T20I debut (cap 101): 14 December 2023 v India
- Last T20I: 23 August 2024 v West Indies

Domestic team information
- Years: Team
- 2015/16–2018/19: Gauteng
- 2017/18–2018/19: Lions
- 2018: Cape Town Blitz
- 2019/20: South Western Districts
- 2019/20–2020/21: Cape Cobras
- 2019/20–present: Western Province
- 2019: Nelson Mandela Bay Giants
- 2023: Joburg Super Kings
- 2023: Jaffna Kings
- 2024–present: Seattle Orcas
- 2024,2026: Rajasthan Royals
- 2025: Fortune Barishal

Career statistics
Competition	Test	ODI	T20I	FC
Matches	3	14	8	44
Runs scored	33	41	10	411
Batting average	8.25	13.66	5.00	11.10
100s/50s	0/0	0/0	0/0	0/0
Top score	23	17	9	48
Balls bowled	376	659	174	7,206
Wickets	14	22	6	141
Bowling average	16.92	30.50	39.83	26.46
5 wickets in innings	0	0	0	3
10 wickets in match	0	0	0	0
Best bowling	4/33	4/46	2/21	5/36
Catches/stumpings	1/–	0/–	2/–	10/–
- Source: ESPNcricinfo, 3 December 2025

Nandre Burger (born 11 August 1995) is a South African cricketer who plays for the South African cricket team and Western Province in South African domestic cricket. He has described himself as an accidental cricketer as he endured a serendipitous path to cricketing journey.

== Early life ==
Burger played tennis and squash during his teenage years before switching to cricket. He was already ranked among the top tennis players in the age-group regional tennis championships at the age of fifteen. He also competed in squash national championships at the age of 17. However, his squash stint was cut short due to a prolonged persistent back injury layoff and as a result he switched his focus to cricket. He even developed ambitions to be playing at ATP Tour when he began seriously compromising himself about taking tennis as his career pathway.

He received a full scholarship to pursue psychology major at the University of the Witwatersrand in 2014. It was at the University of the Witwatersrand, where he decided to try his luck in cricket and he earned a trial after gaining admission at the university. He was coached by Neil Levenson at his university, under whom he received guidance and learned the skillsets. Neil Levenson especially worked closely with Burger to rectify technical aspects regarding alignment from the landing foot to the release point. Burger has told that cricket has always been his backup option after academics. He then received an opportunity to become a net bowler for Highveld Lions in South African domestic competition.

He received his first franchise contract from Cape Cobras during the 2016–2017 season, and it was a tough pill to swallow, especially when he was faced with the dilemma of whether to complete his psychology degree or fulfill his cricket ambitions. He made the difficult decision to drop out of his degree as he decided to discontinue his higher studies and left Johannesburg immediately to move to Cape Town as his Cape Cobras contract meant he should be readily available in Cape Town.

== Domestic career ==
He made his first-class debut for Gauteng in the 2015–16 Sunfoil 3-Day Cup on 11 February 2016. He made his T20 debut for Gauteng in the 2016-17 CSA Provincial T20 Challenge on 14 February 2016. He made his List A debut for Gauteng in the 2016–17 CSA Provincial One-Day Challenge on 26 February 2017.

He was the leading wicket-taker in the 2017–18 CSA Provincial One-Day Challenge tournament for Gauteng, with 19 dismissals in seven matches. In July 2018, he was named in the Cricket South Africa Emerging Squad. In September 2018, he was named in Gauteng's squad for the 2018 Africa T20 Cup. He was the leading wicket-taker in the tournament, with eleven dismissals in six matches. He joined Cape Town Blitz team as an injury replacement to Anrich Nortje for the latter stages of the 2018 Mzansi Super League.

In September 2019, he was named in the squad for the Nelson Mandela Bay Giants team for the 2019 Mzansi Super League tournament. In April 2021, he was named in Western Province's squad, ahead of the 2021–22 cricket season in South Africa. He sustained a lumbar stress fracture which kept him out of cricket related activities for over a year until October 2022.

On 19 December 2023, he was bought by Rajasthan Royals for 50 lakh rupees to play in IPL 2024.

== International career ==
In January 2021, he was named in South Africa's Twenty20 International (T20I) squad for their series against Pakistan. Following his selection for South Africa's T20I squad against Pakistan in January 2021, Nandre Burger made his international debut in all three formats—T20I, ODI, and Test—within 13 days against India in December 2023. He made his debut with figures of 3/50 and 4/33.

In March 2024, he earned his first national contract from Cricket South Africa ahead of the 2024–25 season. In May 2024, he was named as a reserve player in South Africa's squad for the 2024 ICC Men's T20 World Cup tournament.
