= English cricket team in South Africa in 2020–21 =

International cricket tour

	South Africa	England
- Dates: 27 November – 9 December 2020
Captains	Quinton de Kock	Eoin Morgan

One Day International series

Twenty20 International series
- Results: England won the 3-match series 3–0
Most runs	Rassie van der Dussen (136)	Dawid Malan (173)
Most wickets	Lungi Ngidi (4); Tabraiz Shamsi (4)	Sam Curran (3); Chris Jordan (3)
- Player of the series: Dawid Malan (Eng)

The England cricket team toured South Africa during November and December 2020 to play three One Day International (ODI) and three Twenty20 International (T20I) matches. However, the ODI matches were called off due to a COVID-19 outbreak. The ODI series would have formed part of the inaugural 2020–2023 ICC Cricket World Cup Super League.

Due to the COVID-19 pandemic, the England team stayed in a bio-secure environment whilst in South Africa, with the matches played in Cape Town and Paarl. In October 2020, Cricket South Africa (CSA) made a plea to its parliament, saying that is of "critical importance", while waiting on government approval for the tour to go ahead. On 21 October 2020, both cricket boards agreed to the series, with the full tour itinerary being confirmed.

England won the first two T20I matches to take an unassailable lead in the series. England won the third match by nine wickets to take the series 3–0, with the victory putting England at the top of the ICC T20I Championship.

The first ODI match, originally scheduled to be played on 4 December, was cancelled less than an hour before it was due to start, after a South African player tested positive for coronavirus. As a result, the fixture was moved back by two days. However, on 6 December, the rescheduled match was abandoned after two members of the hotel staff tested positive for coronavirus. Shortly after the match was called off, two members of England's touring party returned "unconfirmed positive tests" for the virus. Later the same day, the England and Wales Cricket Board (ECB) confirmed that the second ODI, scheduled for 7 December, would not be played on that date. On 7 December, the remainder of the ODI series was postponed. Both cricket boards agreed to work on hosting the ODI series at another time.

== Squads ==
ODIs		T20Is	
South Africa	England	South Africa	England
Faf du Plessis~~(c)~~; Temba Bavuma; Junior Dala; Quinton de Kock; ~~Bjorn Fortuin~~; Beuran Hendricks; ~~Reeza Hendricks~~; Heinrich Klaasen; George Linde; Keshav Maharaj; Janneman Malan; David Miller; Lungi Ngidi; Anrich Nortje; Andile Phehlukwayo; Dwaine Pretorius; ~~Kagiso Rabada~~; Tabraiz Shamsi; Lutho Sipamla; JJ Smuts; Glenton Stuurman; ~~Pite van Biljon~~; Rassie van der Dussen; Kyle Verreynne	Eoin Morgan (c); Moeen Ali; Jonny Bairstow; Sam Billings; Jos Buttler (wk); Tom Curran; Lewis Gregory; Liam Livingstone; Adil Rashid; Joe Root; Jason Roy; Olly Stone; Reece Topley; Chris Woakes; Mark Wood	Faf du Plessis[c); Temba Bavuma; Junior Dala; Quinton de Kock; Bjorn Fortuin; Beuran Hendricks; Reeza Hendricks; Heinrich Klaasen; George Linde; Keshav Maharaj; Janneman Malan; David Miller; Lungi Ngidi; Anrich Nortje; Andile Phehlukwayo; Dwaine Pretorius; Kagiso Rabada; Tabraiz Shamsi; Lutho Sipamla; JJ Smuts; Glenton Stuurman; Pite van Biljon; Rassie van der Dussen; Kyle Verreynne	Eoin Morgan (c); Moeen Ali; Jofra Archer; Jonny Bairstow; Sam Billings; Jos Buttler (wk); Sam Curran; Tom Curran; Chris Jordan; Dawid Malan; Adil Rashid; Jason Roy; Ben Stokes; Reece Topley; Mark Wood

Jake Ball, Tom Banton, Tom Helm were also named as reserves for England across both formats. Kagiso Rabada was ruled out of South Africa's ODI squad after picking up a groin injury during the T20I series. South Africa also rested Faf du Plessis, Pite van Biljon, Bjorn Fortuin and Reeza Hendricks for the ODI series.

== Practice matches ==
A South Africa intra-squad warm-up match, due to take place on 21 November, was cancelled after two players tested positive for coronavirus. A second match, scheduled to be played on 23 November, was also cancelled in an attempt to limit the impact of any possible infections. Conversely, England played one 40-over intra-squad match and one 20-over intra-squad match, with Jos Buttler and Eoin Morgan named as the team captains.

21 November 2020
10:00
Scorecard

Team Buttler; 255 (39.1 overs)	v	Team Morgan; 205 (35.5 overs)
Joe Root 77 (77); Tom Curran 4/25 (6.1 overs)		Chris Woakes 55 (41); Lewis Gregory 3/18 (3.5 overs)

Team Buttler won by 50 runs
Newlands Cricket Ground, Cape Town
Umpires: Shaun George (SA) and Allahudien Paleker (SA)

- Team Buttler won the toss and elected to bat.

23 November 2020
17:00 (D/N)
Scorecard

Team Morgan; 139/9 (20 overs)	v	Team Buttler; 141/4 (12.4 overs)
Moeen Ali 41 (40); Olly Stone 3/12 (2 overs)		Sam Curran 45* (18); Tom Curran 2/14 (2 overs)

Team Buttler won by 6 wickets
Boland Park, Paarl
Umpires: Shaun George (SA) and Allahudien Paleker (SA)

- Team Morgan won the toss and elected to bat.

== T20I series ==
=== 1st T20I ===
27 November 2020
18:00 (N)
Scorecard

South Africa; 179/6 (20 overs)	v	England; 183/5 (19.2 overs)
Faf du Plessis 58 (40); Sam Curran 3/28 (4 overs)		Jonny Bairstow 86* (48); George Linde 2/20 (4 overs)

England won by 5 wickets
Newlands Cricket Ground, Cape Town
Umpires: Adrian Holdstock (SA) and Allahudien Paleker (SA)
Player of the match: Jonny Bairstow (Eng)

- England won the toss and elected to field.
- George Linde (SA) made his T20I debut.

=== 2nd T20I ===
29 November 2020
14:30
Scorecard

South Africa; 146/6 (20 overs)	v	England; 147/6 (19.5 overs)
Quinton de Kock 30 (18); Adil Rashid 2/23 (4 overs)		Dawid Malan 55 (40); Tabraiz Shamsi 3/19 (4 overs)

England won by 4 wickets
Boland Park, Paarl
Umpires: Shaun George (SA) and Adrian Holdstock (SA)
Player of the match: Dawid Malan (Eng)

- England won the toss and elected to field.
- This was the first T20I match to be played at this venue.
- Adil Rashid (Eng) took his 50th wicket in T20Is.

=== 3rd T20I ===
1 December 2020
18:00 (N)
Scorecard

South Africa; 191/3 (20 overs)	v	England; 192/1 (17.4 overs)
Rassie van der Dussen 74* (32); Ben Stokes 2/26 (3 overs)		Dawid Malan 99* (47); Anrich Nortje 1/37 (4 overs)

England won by 9 wickets
Newlands Cricket Ground, Cape Town
Umpires: Bongani Jele (SA) and Allahudien Paleker (SA)
Player of the match: Dawid Malan (Eng)

- South Africa won the toss and elected to bat.
- Chris Jordan became the leading wicket-taker for England in T20Is, taking his 66th dismissal.
- Jos Buttler and Dawid Malan (Eng) made the highest partnership for the 2nd wicket in T20Is with 167 runs.

== ODI series ==
=== 1st ODI ===
6 December 2020
10:00
Scorecard

South Africa	v	England

Match postponed
Boland Park, Paarl
Umpires: Marais Erasmus (SA) and Allahudien Paleker (SA)

=== 2nd ODI ===
7 December 2020
13:00 (D/N)
Scorecard

South Africa	v	England

Match postponed
Newlands Cricket Ground, Cape Town
Umpires: Marais Erasmus (SA) and Allahudien Paleker (SA)

=== 3rd ODI ===
9 December 2020
13:00 (D/N)
Scorecard

South Africa	v	England

Match postponed
Newlands Cricket Ground, Cape Town
Umpires: Marais Erasmus (SA) and Bongani Jele (SA)
