= Ferisco Adams =

South African cricketer

Personal information
- Full name: Ferisco Devon Adams
- Born: 12 July 1989 (age 37); Robertson, Cape Province, South Africa
- Batting: Right-handed
- Bowling: Right-arm fast-medium
- Role: All-rounder

Domestic team information
- Years: Team
- 2011/12–present: Boland
- 2011/12–2018/19: Cape Cobras
- 2018: Cape Town Blitz
- 2019: Paarl Rocks
- 2020/21: Knights
- 2023: Paarl Royals
- First-class debut: 1 March 2012 Boland v Gauteng
- List A debut: 28 January 2012 Boland v Free State

Career statistics
Competition	FC	LA	T20
Matches	47	65	85
Runs scored	2,288	1,070	765
Batting average	32.22	24.31	18.21
100s/50s	6/9	0/7	0/1
Top score	149	83	80*
Balls bowled	5,387	2,149	1,498
Wickets	117	71	80
Bowling average	25.31	26.45	23.61
5 wickets in innings	5	0	1
10 wickets in match	1	0	0
Best bowling	6/42	4/23	5/23
Catches/stumpings	36/–	18/–	17/–
- Source: ESPNcricinfo, 13 January 2023

Ferisco Devon Adams (born 12 July 1989) is a South African cricketer who currently plays for Boland. He is a right-handed batter and right-arm fast-medium bowler. Adams made his first-class debut on 1 March 2012 against Gauteng. He was included in the Boland cricket team squad for the 2015 Africa T20 Cup.

In June 2018, he was named in the squad for the Cape Cobras team for the 2018–19 season. In September 2018, he was named in Boland's squad for the 2018 Africa T20 Cup. In October 2018, he was named in Cape Town Blitz's squad for the first edition of the Mzansi Super League T20 tournament. He was the leading run-scorer for Boland in the 2018–19 CSA Provincial One-Day Challenge, with 269 runs in eight matches.

In September 2019, he was named in the squad for the Paarl Rocks team for the 2019 Mzansi Super League tournament. Later the same month, he was named in Boland's squad for the 2019–20 CSA Provincial T20 Cup. In April 2021, he was named in Boland's squad, ahead of the 2021–22 cricket season in South Africa.
