= Sibonelo Makhanya =

South African cricketer (born 1996)

Personal information
- Full name: Bongumusa Sibonelo Makhanya
- Born: 7 March 1996 (age 30); Durban, KwaZulu-Natal, South Africa
- Batting: Right-handed
- Bowling: Right-arm medium
- Role: Batter

Domestic team information
- Years: Team
- 2013/14–2019/20: KwaZulu-Natal
- 2014/15–2019/20: Dolphins
- 2018: Cape Town Blitz
- 2019: Paarl Rocks
- 2020/21: Titans
- 2021/22–present: Northerns
- 2023: Joburg Super Kings

Career statistics
Competition	FC	LA	T20
Matches	75	71	76
Runs scored	2,988	1,423	823
Batting average	26.67	26.35	20.57
100s/50s	3/15	0/13	0/1
Top score	192	82	62*
Balls bowled	2,218	916	252
Wickets	24	18	6
Bowling average	49.41	41.94	61.33
5 wickets in innings	0	0	0
10 wickets in match	0	0	0
Best bowling	2/15	3/36	3/21
Catches/stumpings	36/–	33/–	21/–
- Source: ESPNcricinfo, 24 January 2023

Bongumusa Sibonelo Makhanya (born 7 March 1996) is a South African cricketer. He was part of South Africa U19 team for the 2014 ICC Under-19 Cricket World Cup. He was included in the KwaZulu-Natal cricket team squad for the 2015 Africa T20 Cup. In August 2017, he was named in Nelson Mandela Bay Stars' squad for the first season of the T20 Global League. However, in October 2017, Cricket South Africa initially postponed the tournament until November 2018, with it being cancelled soon after.

In October 2018, Makhanya was named in Cape Town Blitz's squad for the first edition of the Mzansi Super League T20 tournament. In September 2019, he was named in the squad for the Paarl Rocks team for the 2019 Mzansi Super League tournament. In April 2021, he was named in Northerns' squad, ahead of the 2021–22 cricket season in South Africa.
