= Wihan Lubbe =

South African cricketer

Personal information
- Full name: Wihan Johannes Lubbe
- Born: 22 November 1992 (age 33); Pretoria, Transvaal Province, South Africa
- Batting: Left-handed
- Bowling: Right-arm off break
- Role: Batter

International information
- National side: South Africa
- T20I debut (cap 90): 10 April 2021 v Pakistan
- Last T20I: 12 April 2021 v Pakistan

Domestic team information
- Years: Team
- 2012/13–2019/20: North West
- 2016/17–2019/20: Lions
- 2018: Jozi Stars
- 2018: Nelson Mandela Bay Giants
- 2019: Durban Heat
- 2020/21–2022/23: Warriors
- 2023: Paarl Royals
- 2023/24–present: North West
- 2025: Joburg Super Kings
- 2026: Pretoria Capitals

Career statistics
Competition	T20I	FC	LA	T20
Matches	2	75	88	135
Runs scored	16	3,546	2,683	2,528
Batting average	8.00	32.83	33.96	21.79
100s/50s	0/0	7/19	4/19	1/13
Top score	12	166	162	102
Balls bowled	–	5,279	2,083	948
Wickets	–	78	36	33
Bowling average	–	35.20	44.33	34.84
5 wickets in innings	–	2	0	0
10 wickets in match	–	0	0	0
Best bowling	–	5/20	3/21	3/20
Catches/stumpings	0/–	86/–	55/–	41/–
- Source: ESPNcricinfo, 23 April 2026

Wihan Johannes Lubbe (born 22 November 1992) is a South African cricketer. He made his international debut for the South Africa cricket team in April 2021.

== Career ==
He was included in the North West cricket team squad for the 2015 Africa T20 Cup. In August 2017, he was named in Nelson Mandela Bay Stars' squad for the first season of the T20 Global League. However, in October 2017, Cricket South Africa initially postponed the tournament until November 2018, with it being cancelled soon after.

In June 2018, he was named in the squad for the Highveld Lions team for the 2018–19 season. In September 2018, he was named in North West's squad for the 2018 Africa T20 Cup. On 15 September 2018, he scored his first T20 century, against Limpopo, in Group D of the tournament. He only took 33 balls to reach 100 runs, making it the third fastest T20 century ever. Lubbe was the leading run-scorer for North West in the tournament, with 173 runs in five matches.

In September 2019, he was named in the squad for the Durban Heat team for the 2019 Mzansi Super League tournament. Later the same month, he was named as the captain of North West's squad for the 2019–20 CSA Provincial T20 Cup. In January 2020, in the 2019–20 CSA 4-Day Franchise Series, he took his maiden five-wicket haul in first-class cricket.

In March 2021, Lubbe was named in South Africa's Twenty20 International (T20I) squad for their series against Pakistan. He made his T20I debut for South Africa, against Pakistan, on 10 April 2021. Later the same month, he was named in Eastern Province's squad, ahead of the 2021–22 cricket season in South Africa.
