= Grant Thomson =

South African cricketer

Personal information
- Born: 18 March 1988 (age 38); Kempton Park, South Africa
- Source: Cricinfo, 20 January 2020

Grant Thomson (born 18 March 1988) is a South African first-class cricketer. He was included in the Easterns cricket team for the 2015 Africa T20 Cup. He was the leading run-scorer in the 2016–17 CSA Provincial One-Day Challenge, with a total of 472 in ten matches. In August 2017, he was named in the Nelson Mandela Bay Stars squad for the first season of the T20 Global League. However, in October 2017, Cricket South Africa initially postponed the tournament until November 2018, with it being cancelled soon after.

In June 2018, he was named in the squad for the Titans team for the 2018–19 season. In September 2018, he was named in Easterns' squad for the 2018 Africa T20 Cup. He was the leading run-scorer for Easterns in the tournament, with 182 runs in five matches.

In October 2018, he was named in Paarl Rocks' squad for the first edition of the Mzansi Super League T20 tournament. In September 2019, he was named in the squad for the Nelson Mandela Bay Giants team for the 2019 Mzansi Super League tournament. Later the same month, he was named as the captain of Easterns' squad for the 2019–20 CSA Provincial T20 Cup. Thomson lead the team to their inaugural title in the tournament.

In April 2021, he was named in the Easterns team for the 2021–22 cricket season in South Africa.
