= Onke Nyaku =

South African cricketer (born 1994)

Personal information
- Born: 26 September 1994 (age 32)
- Source: Cricinfo, 3 September 2015

Onke Nyaku (born 26 September 1994) is a South African cricketer. He was included in the Eastern Province cricket team squad for the 2015 Africa T20 Cup. In July 2018, he was named in the Cricket South Africa Emerging Squad. In September 2018, he was named in Eastern Province's squad for the 2018 Africa T20 Cup.

In September 2019, he was named in the squad for the Nelson Mandela Bay Giants team for the 2019 Mzansi Super League tournament. Later the same month, he was named in Eastern Province's squad for the 2019–20 CSA Provincial T20 Cup. In April 2021, he was named in South Western Districts' squad, ahead of the 2021–22 cricket season in South Africa.
