= Cameron Delport =

British-South African cricketer

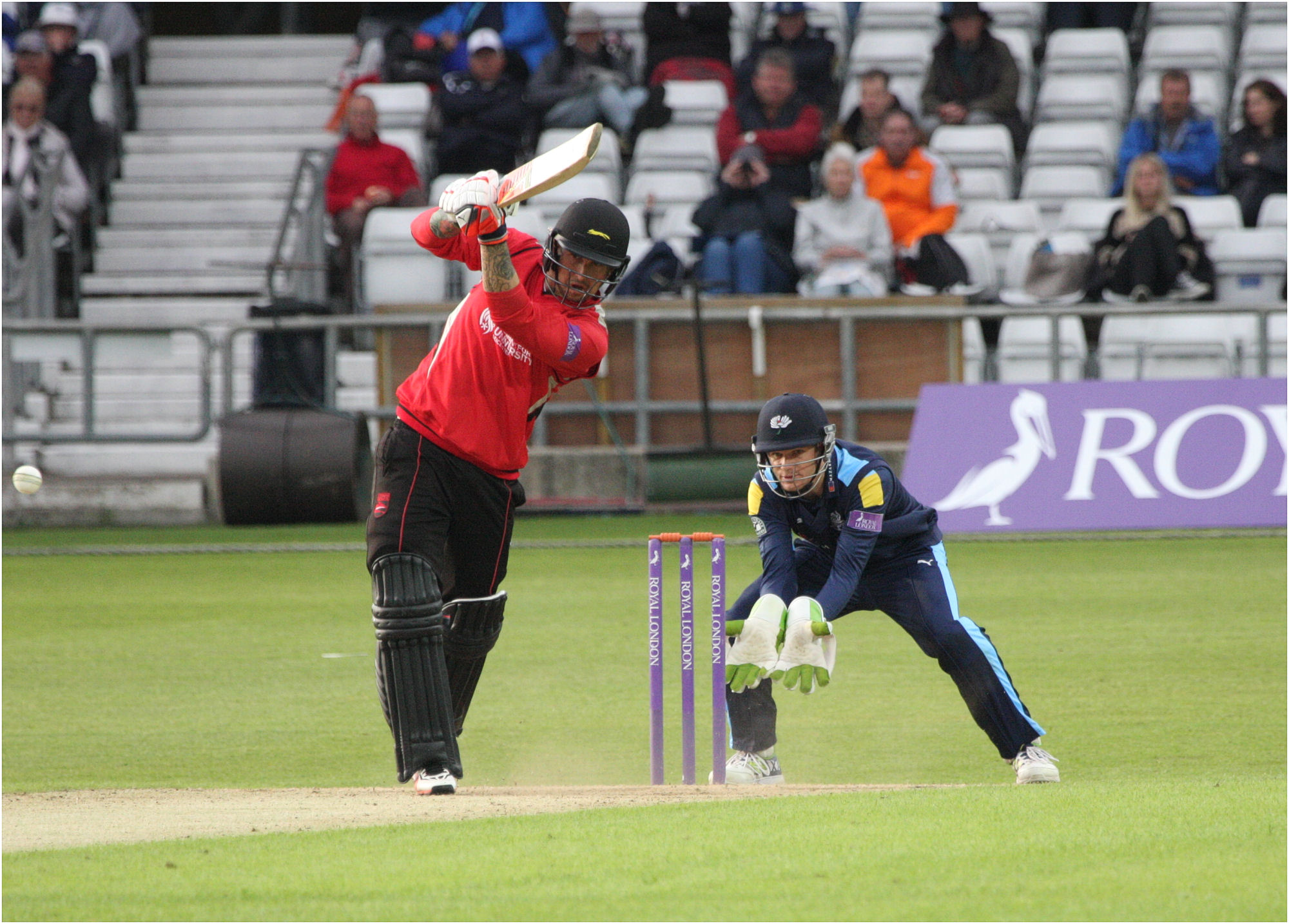
- Delport in 2017

Personal information
- Full name: Cameron Scott Delport
- Born: 12 May 1989 (age 37); Durban, Natal Province, South Africa
- Nickname: Shikra
- Batting: Left-handed
- Bowling: Right-arm medium
- Role: All-rounder

Domestic team information
- Years: Team
- 2008/09–2016/17 (Note: Not every team that Delport has played for is listed here. Those he played for in only one season have been omitted.): Dolphins
- 2008/09–2016/17: KwaZulu-Natal
- 2016–2018: Lahore Qalandars
- 2016–2018: Leicestershire
- 2017–2018: Boost Defenders
- 2018–2019: Paarl Rocks
- 2019–2020: Essex
- 2020: Karachi Kings
- 2022: Comilla Victorians

Career statistics
Competition	FC	LA	T20
Matches	65	110	265
Runs scored	3,463	2,972	6.055
Batting average	32.66	31.95	25.33
100s/50s	4/20	4/15	5/31
Top score	163	169*	129
Balls bowled	1,250	1,572	1,511
Wickets	14	38	71
Bowling average	55.14	42.00	28.80
5 wickets in innings	0	0	0
10 wickets in match	0	0	0
Best bowling	2/10	4/42	4/17
Catches/stumpings	38/–	40/–	87/–
- Source: ESPNcricinfo, 16 November 2022

Cameron Scott Delport (born 12 May 1989) is a British-South African professional cricketer who plays in Twenty20 league tournaments.

He was educated at Westville High School. He is a left-hand opening batsman and right-arm medium pace bowler. Delport also played for the Lahore Qalandars in the Pakistan Super League. He scored 227 runs at the average of 32.42 with the highest total of 78 in the first edition. He was included in the KwaZulu-Natal cricket team for the 2015 Africa T20 Cup. In January 2018, he was bought by the Kolkata Knight Riders in the 2018 IPL auction.

== Career ==
Delport along with Morné van Wyk set the record for the highest opening stand in List A matches with an unbeaten 367 in the South African Domestic League matches in 2014.

Delport moved to England and joined Leicestershire in 2016, qualifying as a local player through his possession of a UK Ancestry Visa. In September 2018, he was named in Paktia's squad for the first edition of the Afghanistan Premier League tournament. The following month, he was named in Paarl Rocks' squad for the first edition of the Mzansi Super League T20 tournament. He was also named in the squad for the Chittagong Vikings team, following the draft for the 2018–19 Bangladesh Premier League. He is set to represent Pokhara Rhinos in 2018 Everest Premier League.

Delport was picked by Islamabad United in 2019 Pakistan Super League Draft. He scored 117 not out in a match against Lahore Qalanders in Karachi.

Delport holds a British passport and uses it for playing in County Cricket. In 2019, he signed with Essex for two seasons of T20 Blast.

In September 2019, he was named in the squad for the Paarl Rocks team for the 2019 Mzansi Super League tournament. In November 2019, he was selected to play for the Rangpur Rangers in the 2019–20 Bangladesh Premier League. In 2021 he was selected for Quetta Qaldiator for Psl6. In April 2021, it was announced Delport would be returning to South African domestic cricket signing with Division 2 team KwaZulu-Natal.

In November 2021, he was selected to play for the Kandy Warriors following the players' draft for the 2021 Lanka Premier League.
