= Sisanda Magala =

South African cricketer

Personal information
- Full name: Sisanda Somila Bruce Magala
- Born: 7 January 1991 (age 35); Port Elizabeth, Cape Province, South Africa
- Batting: Right-handed
- Bowling: Right-arm fast-medium
- Role: Bowler

International information
- National side: South Africa
- ODI debut (cap 143): 26 November 2021 v Netherlands
- Last ODI: 2 April 2023 v Netherlands
- T20I debut (cap 91): 10 April 2021 v Pakistan
- Last T20I: 26 March 2023 v West Indies

Domestic team information
- Years: Team
- 2010/11–2017/18: Eastern Province
- 2013/14–2019/20: Warriors
- 2018: Nelson Mandela Bay Giants
- 2019/20: Border
- 2019: Cape Town Blitz
- 2020/21: Lions
- 2021/22–present: Gauteng
- 2023: Sunrisers Eastern Cape
- 2023: Chennai Super Kings

Career statistics
Competition	ODI	T20I	FC	LA
Matches	7	6	94	124
Runs scored	12	34	2,081	880
Batting average	4.00	34.00	19.44	14.19
100s/50s	0/0	0/0	0/9	0/2
Top score	5*	18*	79	78*
Balls bowled	318	120	13,550	5,242
Wickets	14	6	275	189
Bowling average	23.92	37.66	28.91	26.83
5 wickets in innings	1	0	11	9
10 wickets in match	0	0	1	0
Best bowling	5/43	3/21	6/23	6/24
Catches/stumpings	2/–	1/–	56/–	25/–
- Source: ESPNcricinfo, 2 April 2023

Sisanda Somila Bruce Magala (born 7 January 1991) is a South African professional cricketer. He made his international debut for the South Africa cricket team in April 2021.

== Domestic career ==
Magala was included in the Eastern Province cricket team squad for the 2015 Africa T20 Cup. He was the leading wicket-taker in the 2016 Africa T20 Cup, taking 12 wickets. In August 2017, he was named in Nelson Mandela Bay Stars' squad for the first season of the T20 Global League. However, in October 2017, Cricket South Africa initially postponed the tournament until November 2018, with it being cancelled soon after.

In October 2018, he was named in Nelson Mandela Bay Giants' squad for the first edition of the Mzansi Super League T20 tournament. In September 2019, he was named in the squad for the Cape Town Blitz team for the 2019 Mzansi Super League tournament.

In April 2021, he was named in Gauteng's squad, ahead of the 2021–22 cricket season in South Africa. In May 2021, Magala was named in South Africa's squad for their tour of Ireland, but he was later ruled out of the matches due to an ankle injury.

== International career ==
In January 2020, he was named in South Africa's One Day International (ODI) squad for their series against England. However, ahead of the ODI series, Magala was declared not to be fully fit, and was ruled out of South Africa's squad. However, the following month, Magala was named in South Africa's Twenty20 International (T20I) squad for the matches against England. In March 2021, Magala was named in South Africa's limited overs squads for their series against Pakistan. He made his T20I debut for South Africa, against Pakistan, on 10 April 2021.

In November 2021, he was named in South Africa's ODI squad for their series against the Netherlands. He made his ODI debut on 26 November 2021, for South Africa against the Netherlands. The following month, Magala was named in South Africa's Test squad for the series against India. He took his first international fiver - in any format - against the Netherlands at the Wanderers Stadium in Johannesburg for a scorecard of 5-43. Magala was picked in South African 50-over squad for 2023 World Cup.
