= 2019 Mzansi Super League =

Cricket tournament

- Dates: 8 November – 16 December 2019
- Administrator: Cricket South Africa
- Cricket format: Twenty20
- Tournament format(s): Double round-robin and knockout
- Champions: Paarl Rocks (1st title)
- Runners-up: Tshwane Spartans
- Participants: 6
- Matches: 32
- Attendance: 188,754 (5,899 per match)
- Most runs: Ben Dunk (Nelson Mandela Bay Giants) (415)
- Most wickets: Imran Tahir (Nelson Mandela Bay Giants) (17)
- Official website: MSLT20

The 2019 Mzansi Super League, also known as the MSL 2.0, was the second edition of the Mzansi Super League (MSL) Twenty20 (T20) franchise cricket tournament in South Africa. It started on 8 November and ended on 16 December 2019. Jozi Stars were the defending champions, having won the inaugural 2018 tournament.

== Squads ==
On 7 August 2019, Cricket South Africa announced that more than 250 cricketers had registered for the tournament's draft. Each of the six franchise teams also named the players they had retained for this years' edition. The following day the marquee players were announced. The full squads were confirmed on 3 September 2019.

| Cape Town Blitz | Durban Heat | Jozi Stars | Nelson Mandela Bay Giants | Paarl Rocks | Tshwane Spartans |
|---|---|---|---|---|---|
| Quinton de Kock (c); Wahab Riaz; Liam Livingstone; Dale Steyn; Sisanda Magala; Anrich Nortje; Asif Ali; Mohammad Nawaz; Janneman Malan; George Linde; David Bedingham; Vernon Philander; Marques Ackerman; Gregory Mahlokwana; Aviwe Mgijima; Khwezi Gumede; Moeen Ali; Ayabulela Gqamane | Dane Vilas (c); Andile Phehlukwayo; Alex Hales; David Miller; Ravi Bopara; Keshav Maharaj; Kyle Abbott; Khaya Zondo; Marco Jansen; Daryn Dupavillon; Sarel Erwee; Malusi Siboto; Prenelan Subrayen; Wihan Lubbe; Shaun von Berg; ~~Robert Frylinck~~; Wesley Marshall | Temba Bavuma (c); Kagiso Rabada; Chris Gayle^{1}; Shoaib Malik^{1}; Rassie van der Dussen; Reeza Hendricks; Dan Christian; Duanne Olivier; Simon Harmer; Ryan Rickelton; Aaron Phangiso; Lizaad Williams; Sinethemba Qeshile; Nono Pongolo; Eathan Bosch; Delano Potgieter; Dane Paterson; Gerald Coetzee | JJ Smuts (c); Imran Tahir; Jason Roy; Chris Morris; Junior Dala; Farhaan Behardien; Beuran Hendricks; Matthew Breetzke; Onke Nyaku; Ben Dunk; Heino Kuhn; Marco Marais; Grant Thomson; Akhona Mnyaka; Nandre Burger; Dyllan Matthews; Ryan ten Doeschate; Mthiwekhaya Nabe | Faf du Plessis (c); Isuru Udana; ~~David Willey~~; JP Duminy; Tabraiz Shamsi; Hardus Viljoen; ~~Aiden Markram~~; Kyle Verreynne; Bjorn Fortuin; James Vince; Dwaine Pretorius; Cameron Delport; Sibonelo Makhanya; Henry Davids; Mangaliso Mosehle; Ferisco Adams; Kerwin Mungroo; Thando Ntini; Ruan de Swardt | Heinrich Klaasen (c); AB de Villiers; Tom Curran; Morne Morkel; Lungi Ngidi; Theunis de Bruyn; Roelof van der Merwe; Lutho Sipamla; Pite van Biljon; Tony de Zorzi; Waqar Salamkheil; Dean Elgar; Wiaan Mulder; Vaughn van Jaarsveld; Corbin Bosch; Donavon Ferreira; Imran Manack |

Before the start of the tournament, David Willey was ruled out due to injury and was replaced by Isuru Udana as the marquee player for Paarl Rocks.

^{1} The Jozi Stars have signed Shoaib Malik to take over from Chris Gayle who will exit the stars post their sixth game.

Aiden Markram injured himself before the start of the tournament as was replaced by Kyle Verreynne in the Paarl Rocks squad.

Robert Frylinck withdrew from the competition after being selected to play in the 2019 T10 League in Abu Dhabi. He was replaced by Wesley Marshall.

== Points table ==
| Pos | Team | Pld | W | L | NR | BP | Pts | NRR |
|---|---|---|---|---|---|---|---|---|
| 1 | Paarl Rocks | 10 | 6 | 3 | 1 | 1 | 27 | 0.647 |
| 2 | Nelson Mandela Bay Giants | 10 | 6 | 3 | 1 | 1 | 27 | 0.514 |
| 3 | Tshwane Spartans | 10 | 3 | 2 | 5 | 1 | 23 | 0.519 |
| 4 | Durban Heat | 10 | 3 | 2 | 5 | 0 | 22 | 0.182 |
| 5 | Cape Town Blitz | 10 | 4 | 5 | 1 | 1 | 19 | −0.077 |
| 6 | Jozi Stars | 10 | 0 | 7 | 3 | 0 | 6 | −1.898 |

- The team topping the table after the league phase progresses to the final.
- The second and third teams play against each other in the Play-off match.
- The winning team gets a bonus point for a run rate better than 1.25 times that of the losing team.

== League stage ==
The MSL released the full fixture list on 27 September 2019. The team that tops the table gets direct passage to the final and will also have home ground advantage.

8 November
17:30 (D/N)
Scorecard

| Cape Town Blitz; 213/3 (20 overs) | v | Jozi Stars (H); 198/5 (20 overs) |
| Janneman Malan 99* (59); Dan Christian 1/28 (4 overs) | | Reeza Hendricks 80 (53); Dale Steyn 3/25 (4 overs) |

Cape Town Blitz won by 15 runs
New Wanderers Stadium, Johannesburg
Umpires: Shaun George and Bongani Jele
Player of the match: Janneman Malan (Cape Town Blitz)

- Jozi Stars won the toss and elected to field.

9 November
12:30
Scorecard

| (H) Durban Heat | v | Tshwane Spartans |

Match abandoned
Kingsmead Cricket Ground, Durban
Umpires: Adrian Holdstock and Allahudien Paleker

- No toss.
- No play was possible due to rain.

10 November
10:00
Scorecard

| (H) Paarl Rocks; 170/9 (20 overs) | v | Cape Town Blitz; 84 (15.4 overs) |
| Faf du Plessis 38 (20); George Linde 3/23 (4 overs) | | George Linde 15 (16); Tabraiz Shamsi 3/16 (3 overs) |

Paarl Rocks won by 86 runs
Boland Park, Paarl
Umpires: Shaun George and Stephen Harris
Player of the match: Hardus Viljoen (Paarl Rocks)

- Paarl Rocks won the toss and elected to bat.

10 November
14:00
Scorecard

| (H) Nelson Mandela Bay Giants; 167/7 (20 overs) | v | Jozi Stars; 143/5 (20 overs) |
| Farhaan Behardien 48 (34); Kagiso Rabada 2/27 (4 overs) | | Reeza Hendricks 62 (58); Junior Dala 2/35 (4 overs) |

Nelson Mandela Bay Giants won by 24 runs
St George's Park, Port Elizabeth
Umpires: Siphelele Gasa and Brad White
Player of the match: Heino Kuhn (Nelson Mandela Bay Giants)

- Jozi Stars won the toss and elected to field.

13 November
17:30 (D/N)
Scorecard

| (H) Tshwane Spartans; 33/4 (7.1 overs) | v | Nelson Mandela Bay Giants |
| Heinrich Klaasen 12 (10); Chris Morris 2/8 (2 overs) |

No result
Supersport Park, Centurion
Umpires: Murray Brown and Adrian Holdstock

- Nelson Mandela Bay Giants won the toss and elected to field.
- No further play was possible due to rain.

14 November
17:30 (D/N)
Scorecard

| (H) Cape Town Blitz; 183/6 (20 overs) | v | Jozi Stars; 126 (16.2 overs) |
| Liam Livingstone 65 (41); Gerald Coetzee 2/42 (4 overs) | | Temba Bavuma 62 (42); Sisanda Magala 3/17 (2 overs) |

Cape Town Blitz won by 57 runs
Newlands Cricket Ground, Cape Town
Umpires: Lubabalo Gcuma and Arno Jacobs
Player of the match: Liam Livingstone (Cape Town Blitz)

- Jozi Stars won the toss and elected to field.

15 November
17:30 (D/N)
Scorecard

| (H) Durban Heat | v | Paarl Rocks |

No result
Kingsmead Cricket Ground, Durban
Umpires: Bongani Jele and Dennis Smith

- No toss.
- No play was possible due to rain.

16 November
12:30
Scorecard

| (H) Jozi Stars; 108 (18.5 overs) | v | Nelson Mandela Bay Giants; 110/1 (9.1 overs) |
| Temba Bavuma 27 (31); Junior Dala 3/19 (4 overs) | | Ben Dunk 50* (30); Duanne Olivier 1/23 (3 overs) |

Nelson Mandela Bay Giants won by 9 wickets
New Wanderers Stadium, Johannesburg
Umpires: Shaun George and Thomas Mokorosi
Player of the match: Junior Dala (Nelson Mandela Bay Giants)

- Jozi Stars won the toss and elected to bat.

17 November
10:00
Scorecard

| Cape Town Blitz; 174/6 (20 overs) | v | Durban Heat (H); 164/7 (20 overs) |
| Asif Ali 43 (26); Andile Phehlukwayo 2/34 (3 overs) | | Wihan Lubbe 83 (42); Dale Steyn 2/23 (4 overs) |

Cape Town Blitz won by 10 runs
Kingsmead Cricket Ground, Durban
Umpires: Lubabalo Gcuma and Phillip Vosloo
Player of the match: Dale Steyn (Cape Town Blitz)

- Durban Heat won the toss and elected to field.

17 November
14:00
Scorecard

| (H) Paarl Rocks; 185/6 (20 overs) | v | Tshwane Spartans; 188/2 (19.1 overs) |
| James Vince 86* (53); Morné Morkel 2/24 (4 overs) | | Dean Elgar 88* (60); Tabraiz Shamsi 1/41 (4 overs) |

Tshwane Spartans won by 8 wickets
Boland Park, Paarl
Umpires: Clifford Isaacs and Allahudien Paleker
Player of the match: Dean Elgar (Tshwane Spartans)

- Paarl Rocks won the toss and elected to bat.

20 November
17:30 (D/N)
Scorecard

| Cape Town Blitz; 186/9 (20 overs) | v | Nelson Mandela Bay Giants (H); 187/5 (19.2 overs) |
| Quinton de Kock 39 (18); Onke Nyaku 2/17 (2 overs) | | JJ Smuts 73 (51); Dale Steyn 2/38 (4 overs) |

Nelson Mandela Bay Giants won by 5 wickets
St George's Park, Port Elizabeth
Umpires: Arno Jacobs and Dennis Smith
Player of the match: JJ Smuts (Nelson Mandela Bay Giants)

- Cape Town Blitz won the toss and elected to bat.

21 November
17:30 (D/N)
Scorecard

| (H) Tshwane Spartans; 141/4 (15 overs) | v | Durban Heat; 21/3 (2.1 overs) |
| Dean Elgar 57* (37); Malusi Siboto 1/25 (3 overs) | | Dane Vilas 14 (6); Lungi Ngidi 2/2 (1 over) |

No result
Supersport Park, Centurion
Umpires: Stephen Harris and Abdoellah Steenkamp

- Durban Heat won the toss and elected to field.
- The match was initially reduced to 16 overs per side due to rain. No further play was possible during Tshwane Spartans innings. Durban Heat were given a revised target of 66 runs from 5 overs.

22 November
17:30 (D/N)
Scorecard

| Jozi Stars; 129/3 (20 overs) | v | Paarl Rocks (H); 133/6 (16.1 overs) |
| Reeza Hendricks 40 (34); Dwaine Pretorius 1/12 (2 overs) | | James Vince 43 (28); Duanne Olivier 3/39 (4 overs) |

Paarl Rocks won by 4 wickets
Boland Park, Paarl
Umpires: Ryan Hendricks and Adrian Holdstock
Player of the match: Dwaine Pretorius (Paarl Rocks)

- Jozi Stars won the toss and elected to bat.

23 November
12:30
Scorecard

| Durban Heat; 160/5 (20 overs) | v | Nelson Mandela Bay Giants (H); 163/5 (19.5 overs) |
| Ravi Bopara 57* (43); Nandre Burger 2/24 (4 overs) | | Jason Roy 50 (38); Malusi Siboto 2/41 (3.5 overs) |

Nelson Mandela Bay Giants won by 5 wickets
St George's Park, Port Elizabeth
Umpires: Shaun George and Brad White
Player of the match: Jason Roy (Nelson Mandela Bay Giants)

- Durban Heat won the toss and elected to bat.

24 November
10:00
Scorecard

| Paarl Rocks; 163/8 (20 overs) | v | Cape Town Blitz (H); 161/9 (20 overs) |
| Henry Davids 46 (33); Sisanda Magala 2/35 (4 overs) | | Mohammad Nawaz 41 (23); Bjorn Fortuin 2/20 (4 overs) |

Paarl Rocks won by 2 runs
Newlands Cricket Ground, Cape Town
Umpires: Murray Brown and Adrian Holdstock
Player of the match: Henry Davids (Paarl Rocks)

- Cape Town Blitz won the toss and elected to field.

24 November
14:00
Scorecard

| Tshwane Spartans; 155/6 (20 overs) | v | Jozi Stars (H); 135 (18.3 overs) |
| AB de Villiers 53 (33); Dan Christian 2/30 (4 overs) | | Chris Gayle 54 (27); Morné Morkel 3/21 (3.3 overs) |

Tshwane Spartans won by 20 runs
New Wanderers Stadium, Johannesburg
Umpires: Bongani Jele and Allahudien Paleker
Player of the match: AB de Villiers (Tshwane Spartans)

- Tshwane Spartans won the toss and elected to bat.

27 November
17:30 (D/N)
Scorecard

| Paarl Rocks; 166/7 (20 overs) | v | Nelson Mandela Bay Giants (H); 135 (19.4 overs) |
| James Vince 37 (22); Imran Tahir 2/19 (4 overs) | | Ben Dunk 45 (38); Hardus Viljoen 2/21 (4 overs) |

Paarl Rocks won by 31 runs
St George's Park, Port Elizabeth
Umpires: Shaun George and Brad White
Player of the match: Ferisco Adams (Paarl Rocks)

- Nelson Mandela Bay Giants won the toss and elected to field.

28 November
17:30 (D/N)
Scorecard

| (H) Cape Town Blitz; 181/5 (20 overs) | v | Durban Heat; 182/3 (19.3 overs) |
| Janneman Malan 75 (42); Kyle Abbott 2/32 (4 overs) | | Dane Vilas 75* (52); Dale Steyn 2/25 (4 overs) |

Durban Heat won by 7 wickets
Newlands Cricket Ground, Cape Town
Umpires: Siphelele Gasa and Allahudien Paleker
Player of the match: Dane Vilas (Durban Heat)

- Cape Town Blitz won the toss and elected to bat.

29 November
17:30 (D/N)
Scorecard

| Paarl Rocks; 126 (19.4 overs) | v | Tshwane Spartans (H); 127/2 (15 overs) |
| Cameron Delport 25 (12); Roelof van der Merwe 3/15 (4 overs) | | AB de Villiers 69* (37); Bjorn Fortuin 1/21 (4 overs) |

Tshwane Spartans won by 8 wickets
Supersport Park, Centurion
Umpires: Stephen Harris and Bongani Jele
Player of the match: Roelof van der Merwe (Tshwane Spartans)

- Tshwane Spartans won the toss and elected to field.

30 November
12:30
Scorecard

| Nelson Mandela Bay Giants; 173/6 (20 overs) | v | Durban Heat (H); 177/4 (18.5 overs) |
| JJ Smuts 54 (37); Keshav Maharaj 3/15 (4 overs) | | David Miller 50* (39); Chris Morris 1/26 (3.5 overs) |

Durban Heat won by 6 wickets
Kingsmead Cricket Ground, Durban
Umpires: Lubabalo Gcuma and Adrian Holdstock
Player of the match: Keshav Maharaj (Durban Heat)

- Nelson Mandela Bay Giants won the toss and elected to bat.

1 December
10:00
Scorecard

| (H) Jozi Stars; 171/3 (20 overs) | v | Paarl Rocks; 175/5 (19.2 overs) |
| Reeza Hendricks 74 (53); Isuru Udana 2/29 (4 overs) | | Sibonelo Makhanya 63* (47); Kagiso Rabada 3/36 (4 overs) |

Paarl Rocks won by 5 wickets
New Wanderers Stadium, Johannesburg
Umpires: Stephen Harris and Phillip Vosloo
Player of the match: Sibonelo Makhanya (Paarl Rocks)

- Paarl Rocks won the toss and elected to field.

1 December
14:00
Scorecard

| (H) Cape Town Blitz; 157/5 (20 overs) | v | Tshwane Spartans; 142/7 (20 overs) |
| David Bedingham 53 (40); Lungi Ngidi 2/30 (4 overs) | | Pite van Biljon 62 (42); Dale Steyn 3/10 (4 overs) |

Cape Town Blitz won by 15 runs
Newlands Cricket Ground, Cape Town
Umpires: Allahudien Paleker and Abdoellah Steenkamp
Player of the match: Dale Steyn (Cape Town Blitz)

- Cape Town Blitz won the toss and elected to bat.

3 December
17:30 (D/N)
Scorecard

| Tshwane Spartans; 188/5 (20 overs) | v | Nelson Mandela Bay Giants (H); 192/4 (19.4 overs) |
| AB de Villiers 63 (38); Imran Tahir 2/28 (4 overs) | | Ben Dunk 99* (54); Lungi Ngidi 2/37 (4 overs) |

Nelson Mandela Bay Giants won by 6 wickets
St George's Park, Port Elizabeth
Umpires: Siphelele Gasa and Dennis Smith
Player of the match: Ben Dunk (Nelson Mandela Bay Giants)

- Tshwane Spartans won the toss and elected to bat.

4 December
17:30 (D/N)
Scorecard

| (H) Paarl Rocks; 195/2 (20 overs) | v | Durban Heat; 197/4 (18.5 overs) |
| Cameron Delport 84 (49); Malusi Siboto 1/29 (4 overs) | | Alex Hales 97* (55); Tabraiz Shamsi 2/37 (4 overs) |

Durban Heat won by 6 wickets
Boland Park, Paarl
Umpires: Lubabalo Gcuma and Shaun George
Player of the match: Alex Hales (Durban Heat)

- Durban Heat won the toss and elected to field.

5 December
17:30 (D/N)
Scorecard

| (H) Tshwane Spartans | v | Jozi Stars |

Match abandoned
Supersport Park, Centurion
Umpires: Bongani Jele and Brad White

- No toss.
- No play was possible due to rain.

6 December
17:30 (D/N)
Scorecard

| Nelson Mandela Bay Giants; 173/6 (20 overs) | v | Cape Town Blitz (H); 162/8 (20 overs) |
| Ben Dunk 75 (56); Wahab Riaz 3/19 (4 overs) | | Janneman Malan 60 (41); Imran Tahir 2/22 (4 overs) |

Nelson Mandela Bay Giants won by 11 runs
Newlands Cricket Ground, Cape Town
Umpires: Shaun George and Clifford Isaacs
Player of the match: Ben Dunk (Nelson Mandela Bay Giants)

- Cape Town Blitz won the toss and elected to field.

7 December
12:30
Scorecard

| (H) Jozi Stars | v | Durban Heat |

Match abandoned
New Wanderers Stadium, Johannesburg
Umpires: Ryan Hendricks and Allahudien Paleker

- No toss.
- No play was possible due to rain.

8 December
10:00
Scorecard

| (H) Paarl Rocks; 168/5 (20 overs) | v | Nelson Mandela Bay Giants; 156/6 (20 overs) |
| Cameron Delport 39 (22); Imran Tahir 2/14 (4 overs) | | Heino Kuhn 58 (43); Ferisco Adams 3/36 (4 overs) |

Paarl Rocks won by 12 runs
Boland Park, Paarl
Umpires: Adrian Holdstock and Thomas Mokorosi
Player of the match: Tabraiz Shamsi (Paarl Rocks)

- Nelson Mandela Bay Giants won the toss and elected to field.

8 December
14:00
Scorecard

| (H) Tshwane Spartans | v | Cape Town Blitz |

Match abandoned
Supersport Park, Centurion
Umpires: Stephen Harris and Arno Jacobs

- No toss.
- No play was possible due to rain.

10 December
10:00
Scorecard

| (H) Durban Heat | v | Jozi Stars |

Match abandoned
Kingsmead Cricket Ground, Durban
Umpires: Arno Jacobs and Bongani Jele

- No toss.
- No play was possible due to rain.

== Playoffs ==
| Eliminator | | | Final |
| | | | 1 | Paarl Rocks | 148/2 (14.2) |
| 3 | Tshwane Spartans | 166/4 (20) | 3 | Tshwane Spartans | 147/6 (20) |
| 2 | Nelson Mandela Bay Giants | 144/8 (20) |

=== Eliminator ===
13 December
17:30 (D/N)
Scorecard

| Tshwane Spartans; 166/4 (20 overs) | v | Nelson Mandela Bay Giants; 144/8 (20 overs) |
| Pite van Biljon 48* (32); Mthiwekhaya Nabe 2/24 (3 overs) | | Chris Morris 42 (23); David Wiese 3/30 (4 overs) |

Tshwane Spartans won by 22 runs
St George's Park, Port Elizabeth
Umpires: Stephen Harris and Brad White
Player of the match: David Wiese (Tshwane Spartans)

- Nelson Mandela Bay Giants won the toss and elected to field.

=== Final ===
16 December
17:30 (D/N)
Scorecard

| Tshwane Spartans; 147/6 (20 overs) | v | Paarl Rocks; 148/2 (14.2 overs) |
| AB de Villiers 51 (37); Isuru Udana 2/24 (4 overs) | | Henry Davids 77* (44); Imran Manack 1/18 (2.2 overs) |

Paarl Rocks won by 8 wickets
Boland Park, Paarl
Umpires: Bongani Jele and Allahudien Paleker
Player of the match: Henry Davids (Paarl Rocks)

- Paarl Rocks won the toss and elected to field.

== Statistics ==
=== Most runs ===
| Player | Team | Mat | Inns | Runs | Ave | SR | HS | 100 | 50 | 4s | 6s |
|---|---|---|---|---|---|---|---|---|---|---|---|
| Ben Dunk | Nelson Mandela Bay Giants | 11 | 10 | 415 | 51.87 | 149.81 | 99* | 0 | 3 | 39 | 17 |
| Janneman Malan | Cape Town Blitz | 9 | 9 | 358 | 44.75 | 149.79 | 99* | 0 | 3 | 26 | 22 |
| AB de Villiers | Tshwane Spartans | 9 | 9 | 325 | 46.42 | 152.58 | 69* | 0 | 4 | 26 | 11 |
| Reeza Hendricks | Jozi Stars | 7 | 7 | 275 | 39.28 | 125.00 | 80 | 0 | 3 | 28 | 4 |
| Henry Davids | Paarl Rocks | 10 | 10 | 275 | 30.55 | 135.46 | 77* | 0 | 1 | 33 | 7 |

=== Most wickets ===
| Player | Team | Mat | Inns | Wkts | BBI | Avg | Econ | SR | 4w | 5w |
|---|---|---|---|---|---|---|---|---|---|---|
| Imran Tahir | Nelson Mandela Bay Giants | 11 | 11 | 17 | 3/23 | 14.23 | 5.76 | 14.8 | 0 | 0 |
| Tabraiz Shamsi | Paarl Rocks | 10 | 10 | 16 | 3/16 | 16.87 | 7.10 | 14.2 | 0 | 0 |
| Dale Steyn | Cape Town Blitz | 8 | 8 | 15 | 3/10 | 15.13 | 7.09 | 12.8 | 0 | 0 |
| Morne Morkel | Tshwane Spartans | 9 | 8 | 12 | 3/21 | 13.58 | 6.35 | 12.8 | 0 | 0 |
| Junior Dala | Nelson Mandela Bay Giants | 8 | 8 | 12 | 3/19 | 23.83 | 10.59 | 13.5 | 0 | 0 |

== Broadcasting ==
The SABC again got the domestic broadcast rights for the 2019 season. All matches were covered live on the SABC3 television channel and on Radio 2000.

Global Sports Commerce of Singapore bought the broadcast and digital rights outside of South Africa.
