= Vaughn van Jaarsveld =

South African cricketer

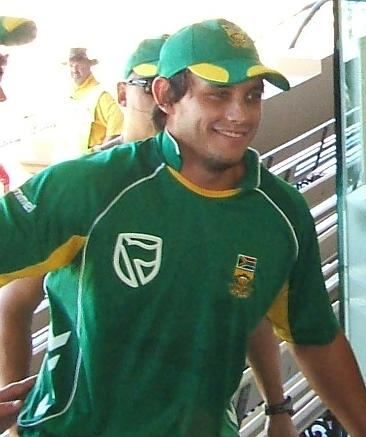

Personal information
- Full name: Vaughn Bernard van Jaarsveld
- Born: 2 February 1985 (age 41); Johannesburg, Transvaal Province, South Africa
- Batting: Left-handed
- Bowling: Right–arm medium
- Role: Batsman

International information
- National side: South Africa
- ODI debut (cap 94): 16 January 2009 v Australia
- Last ODI: 30 January 2009 v Australia
- ODI shirt no.: 11
- T20I debut (cap 37): 11 January 2009 v Australia
- Last T20I: 27 March 2009 v Australia
- T20I shirt no.: 4

Domestic team information
- Years: Team
- 2002/03–2009/10: Gauteng
- 2003/04–2010/11: Lions (squad no. 60)
- 2007: Warwickshire
- 2010/11–2019/20: Dolphins (squad no. 60)
- 2010/11–2013/14: KwaZulu Natal
- 2015/16–2016/17: KwaZulu Natal Inland
- 2017/18–2019/20: KwaZulu Natal
- 2018/19: Paarl Rocks
- 2019/20: Tshwane Spartans

Career statistics
Competition	ODI	T20I	FC	LA
Matches	2	3	129	184
Runs scored	9	15	8,442	5,855
Batting average	4.50	5.00	40.58	36.36
100s/50s	0/0	0/0	21/52	9/43
Top score	5	12	203	124
Balls bowled	–	–	589	72
Wickets	–	–	6	0
Bowling average	–	–	51.00	–
5 wickets in innings	–	–	0	–
10 wickets in match	–	–	0	–
Best bowling	–	–	2/67	–
Catches/stumpings	1/–	0/–	116/–	78/–
- Source: CricketArchive, 15 July 2025

Vaughn Bernard van Jaarsveld (born 2 February 1985) is a South African cricketer who plays for the Dolphins as a left-handed batsman and occasional wicket-keeper. He has represented his country at under-nineteen level.

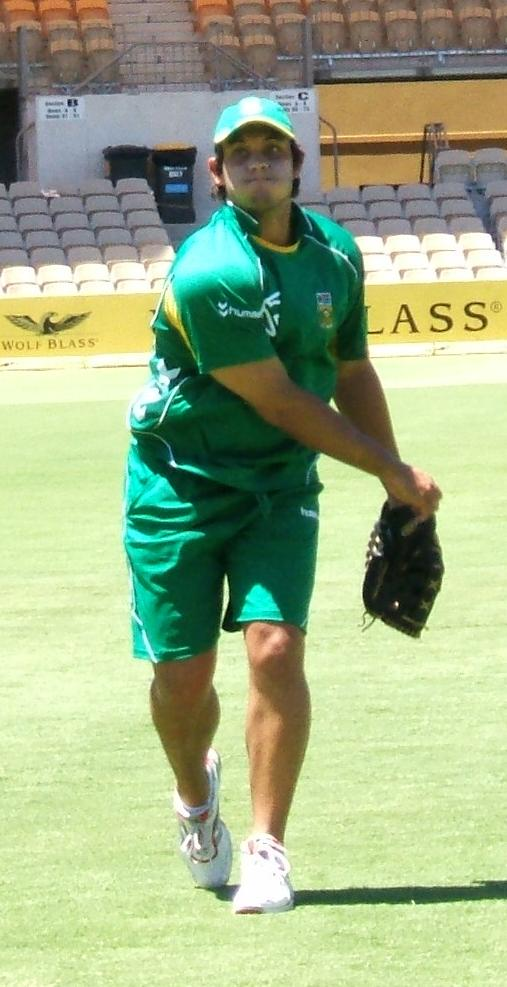
Van Jaarsveld at fielding practice.

In 2007, he signed a three-year deal with Warwickshire after having trials with its seconds and playing in The Birmingham and District Premier League for Moseley. Somerset also showed interest in him. The Warwickshire deal went sour when he returned to South Africa in 2008, violating his contract.

He was selected for the One Day International leg of the South African cricket team's 2008–09 tour of Australia, on the back of strong performances in the MTN Domestic Championship: in eight innings, he hit 487 runs at an average of seventy and a strike-rate of 111. Before the preceding Test series was concluded, however, he was called up as cover for South African captain Graeme Smith, who was struggling with tennis elbow.

Van Jaarsveld made his international debut for South Africa in a Twenty20 International against Australia at the Melbourne Cricket Ground on 11 January 2009. He was included in the KZN Inland squad for the 2015 Africa T20 Cup.

In August 2017, he was named in Pretoria Mavericks' squad for the first season of the T20 Global League. However, in October 2017, Cricket South Africa initially postponed the tournament until November 2018, with it being cancelled soon after.

In October 2018, he was named in Paarl Rocks' squad for the first edition of the Mzansi Super League T20 tournament. He was the leading run-scorer for Dolphins in the 2018–19 CSA 4-Day Franchise Series, with 673 runs in seven matches.

In September 2019, he was named in the squad for the Tshwane Spartans team for the 2019 Mzansi Super League tournament.
