= Mangaliso Mosehle =

South African cricketer

Personal information
- Born: 24 April 1990 (age 36); Duduza, Gauteng, South Africa
- Nickname: Mangi
- Batting: Right-handed
- Role: Batsman and wicket-keeper

International information
- National side: South Africa
- T20I debut (cap 66): 20 January 2017 v Sri Lanka
- Last T20I: 29 October 2017 v Bangladesh

Domestic team information
- Years: Team
- 2008/09–2014/15: Easterns (squad no. 34)
- 2008/09–2015/16: Titans
- 2015/16: Northerns
- 2016/17–2018/19: Gauteng
- 2016/17–2018/19: Lions
- 2018/19–2019/20: Paarl Rocks
- 2019/20: KwaZulu-Natal Inland
- 2019/20–2020/21: Dolphins
- 2019/20: Cape Cobras
- 2021/22: Free State
- 2022/23: Easterns

Career statistics
Competition	T20I	FC	LA	T20
Matches	7	116	139	148
Runs scored	105	3,748	2,330	1,644
Batting average	21.00	22.05	22.62	16/94
100s/50s	0/0	2/15	2/8	0/7
Top score	36	114	118	93*
Catches/stumpings	6/2	346/27	122/14	86/19
- Source: CricInfo, 55 July 2025

Mangaliso Mosehle (born 24 April 1990) is a South African cricketer. He is a right-handed batsman and wicket-keeper.

== U19 career ==
Mosehle was part of the South African side for the 2008 Under-19s World Cup in Malaysia, playing two games in the competition, though he did not get the chance either to bat or bowl. Mosehle has played two Youth Test matches and one Youth One Day International for the South African Under-19s team. Mosehle has represented his country on a number of occasions in 2009 Hong Kong sixes and again in 2014 SA'A touring squad to Australia.

== Domestic career ==
Mosehle made his first-class debut for Easterns in October 2008. He has been contracted with the Titans Cricket team in South Africa on a 2-year contract. He was included in the Easterns cricket team squad for the 2015 Africa T20 Cup. In August 2017, he was named in Stellenbosch Monarchs' squad for the first season of the T20 Global League. However, in October 2017, Cricket South Africa initially postponed the tournament until November 2018, with it being cancelled soon after.

In June 2018, he was named in the squad for the Highveld Lions team for the 2018–19 season. In September 2018, he was named in Gauteng's squad for the 2018 Africa T20 Cup.

In October 2018, he was named in Paarl Rocks' squad for the first edition of the Mzansi Super League T20 tournament. In September 2019, he was named in the squad for the Paarl Rocks team for the 2019 Mzansi Super League tournament. In April 2021, he was named in Free State's squad, ahead of the 2021–22 cricket season in South Africa.

== International career ==
In January 2017 he was included in South Africa's Twenty20 International (T20I) squad for their series against Sri Lanka. He made his T20I debut for South Africa against Sri Lanka on 20 January 2017.

== Personal life ==
Mosehle is a devout Christian with the bible verse Mark 8:34-36 tattooed on his calf.
