= Pite van Biljon =

South African cricketer

Personal information
- Full name: Petrus Johannes van Biljon
- Born: 15 April 1986 (age 40); Bloemfontein, Orange Free State, South Africa
- Batting: Right-handed
- Bowling: Right-arm medium
- Role: Batter
- Relatives: Suzaan van Biljon (sister)

International information
- National side: South Africa
- T20I debut (cap 86): 21 February 2020 v Australia
- Last T20I: 14 April 2021 v Pakistan

Domestic team information
- Years: Team
- 2006/07–2008/09: Northerns
- 2008/09–2010/11: Eastern Province
- 2010/11–2022/23: Free State
- 2011/12: Impi
- 2012/13–2020/21: Knights
- 2018: Jozi Stars
- 2019: Tshwane Spartans
- 2023/24: KwaZulu-Natal Inland

Career statistics
Competition	T20I	FC	LA	T20
Matches	10	123	119	101
Runs scored	125	7,608	3,384	1,826
Batting average	20.83	41.34	34.88	27.25
100s/50s	0/0	20/39	5/15	0/7
Top score	42	218	167*	75*
Catches/stumpings	1/–	93/–	32/1	19/–
- Source: ESPNcricinfo, 15 July 2025

Petrus Johannes van Biljon (born 15 April 1986) is a South African former international cricketer. He made his international debut for the South Africa cricket team in February 2020. His sister, Suzaan, competed at the 2008 and 2012 Olympics in the breaststroke swimming events.

== Career ==
In August 2017, Van Biljon was named in Benoni Zalmi's squad for the first season of the T20 Global League. However, in October 2017, Cricket South Africa initially postponed the tournament until November 2018, with it being cancelled soon after.

In July 2018, Van Biljon was named as the captain of the Knights team, ahead of the 2018/2019 season. In October 2018, he was named in Jozi Stars' squad for the first edition of the Mzansi Super League T20 tournament. In September 2019, he was named in the squad for the Tshwane Spartans team for the 2019 Mzansi Super League tournament.

In February 2020, Van Biljon was named in South Africa's Twenty20 International (T20I) squads for their series against England and against Australia. He made his T20I debut for South Africa, against Australia, on 21 February 2020.

In November 2020, van Biljon was named in South Africa's squad for their limited overs series against England. In April 2021, he was named in Free State's squad, ahead of the 2021–22 cricket season in South Africa.

In February 2022, van Biljon was named as the captain of the Knights for the 2021–22 CSA T20 Challenge.
