= Malusi Siboto =

South African cricketer

Personal information
- Full name: Malusi Paul Siboto
- Born: 20 August 1987 (age 39); Langa, Cape Town, South Africa
- Batting: Left-handed
- Bowling: Right-arm medium
- Role: Bowler

Domestic team information
- Years: Team
- 2007/08–2019/20: North West
- 2011/12–2015/16: Knights
- 2011/12–2015/16: Free State
- 2016/17: Easterns
- 2016/17–2017/18: Titans
- 2018/19–2020/21: Lions
- 2018: Cape Town Blitz
- 2019: Durban Heat
- 2021/22–present: Gauteng
- 2023: Joburg Super Kings

Career statistics
Competition	FC	LA	T20
Matches	138	137	142
Runs scored	2,382	683	144
Batting average	18.04	12.88	11.07
100s/50s	0/5	0/1	0/0
Top score	56*	50*	19
Balls bowled	20,931	4,706	2,578
Wickets	334	137	126
Bowling average	30.47	34.35	26.56
5 wickets in innings	7	3	0
10 wickets in match	0	0	0
Best bowling	7/44	6/49	4/19
Catches/stumpings	37/–	25/–	29/–
- Source: ESPNcricinfo, 3 November 2025

Malusi Siboto (born 20 August 1987) is a South African cricketer. He was included in the Free State cricket team squad for the 2015 Africa T20 Cup. In August 2017, he was named in the Cape Town Knight Riders' squad for the first season of the T20 Global League. However, in October 2017, Cricket South Africa initially postponed the tournament until November 2018, with it being cancelled soon after.

In June 2018, he was named in the squad for the Highveld Lions team for the 2018–19 season. In October 2018, he was named in Cape Town Blitz's squad for the first edition of the Mzansi Super League T20 tournament. In September 2019, he was named in the squad for the Durban Heat team for the 2019 Mzansi Super League tournament. Later the same month, he was named in North West's squad for the 2019–20 CSA Provincial T20 Cup. In April 2021, he was named in Gauteng's squad, ahead of the 2021–22 cricket season in South Africa.
