= Prenelan Subrayen =

South African cricketer

Personal information
- Full name: Prenelan Subrayen
- Born: 23 September 1993 (age 33); Tongaat, Natal Province, South Africa
- Batting: Right-handed
- Bowling: Right-arm off break
- Role: All-rounder

International information
- National side: South Africa
- Test debut (cap 374): 6 July 2025 v Zimbabwe
- Last Test: 12 October 2025 v Pakistan
- ODI debut (cap 160): 19 August 2025 v Australia
- Last ODI: 30 November 2025 v India
- T20I debut (cap 119): 22 March 2026 v New Zealand
- Last T20I: 29 August 2026 v Zimbabwe

Domestic team information
- Years: Team
- 2010/11–: KwaZulu-Natal
- 2011/12–: Dolphins
- 2018/19–2019/20: Durban Heat
- 2023–present: Durban's Super Giants

Career statistics
Competition	Test	ODI	T20I	FC
Matches	2	2	4	83
Runs scored	12	18	0	1,672
Batting average	6.00	9.00	0.00	18.17
100s/50s	0/0	0/0	0/0	1/7
Top score	8	17	0	134*
Balls bowled	328	120	90	16,228
Wickets	6	1	7	257
Bowling average	29.66	119.00	13.42	28.59
5 wickets in innings	0	0	0	13
10 wickets in match	0	0	0	3
Best bowling	4/42	1/46	3/32	7/52
Catches/stumpings	0/–	0/–	0/–	42/–
- Source: Cricinfo, 29 August 2026

Prenelan Subrayen (born 23 September 1993) is a South African cricketer who made his debut in November 2011. In August 2017, he was named in Durban Heat's squad for the first season of the T20 Global League. However, in October 2017, Cricket South Africa initially postponed the tournament until November 2018, with it being cancelled soon after.

In September 2019, he was named in the squad for the Durban Heat team for the 2019 Mzansi Super League tournament. Later the same month, he was named in KwaZulu-Natal's squad for the 2019–20 CSA Provincial T20 Cup. He was the leading wicket-taker in the 2019–20 CSA 4-Day Franchise Series, with 38 dismissals in seven matches. In April 2021, he was named in KwaZulu-Natal's squad, ahead of the 2021–22 cricket season in South Africa.

In May 2021, Subrayen was named in South Africa's Test squad for their series against the West Indies. In December 2021, Subrayen received another call-up to South Africa's Test squad, this time for their home series against India.
