= Farhaan Behardien =

South African cricketer

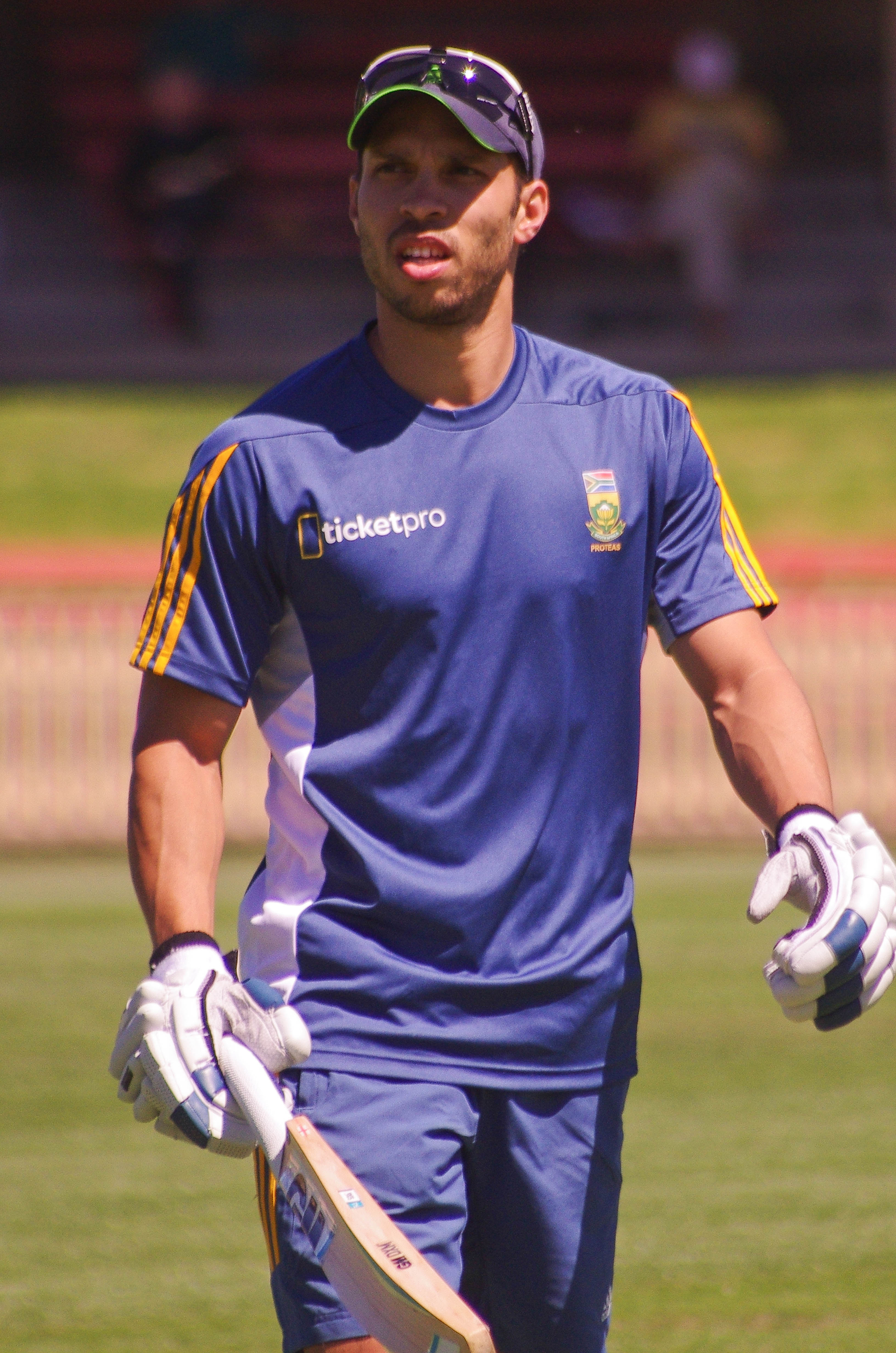

Personal information
- Full name: Farhaan Behardien
- Born: 9 October 1983 (age 43); Johannesburg, Transvaal Province, South Africa
- Nickname: Fudgie
- Batting: Right-handed
- Bowling: Right-arm medium
- Role: All-rounder

International information
- National side: South Africa (2012 - 2018)
- ODI debut (cap 107): 22 January 2013 v New Zealand
- Last ODI: 16 February 2018 v India
- ODI shirt no.: 28
- T20I debut (cap 50): 30 March 2012 v India
- Last T20I: 17 November 2018 v Australia
- T20I shirt no.: 28

Domestic team information
- Years: Team
- 2004/05–2005/06: Western Province
- 2006/07–2019/20: Titans
- 2007/08–2011/12: Northerns
- 2016: Kings XI Punjab
- 2016: Leicestershire
- 2018: Cape Town Blitz
- 2019: Nelson Mandela Bay Giants
- 2020: Durham
- 2020/21: Knights
- 2021/22: Free State
- 2022/23: Boland

Career statistics
Competition	ODI	T20I	FC	LA
Matches	59	38	125	231
Runs scored	1,074	518	7,315	5,670
Batting average	30.68	32.37	40.63	39.65
100s/50s	0/6	0/1	12/46	5/34
Top score	70	64*	150*	113*
Balls bowled	748	30	2,248	1,901
Wickets	14	3	32	35
Bowling average	51.35	9.00	37.46	50.68
5 wickets in innings	0	0	0	0
10 wickets in match	0	0	0	0
Best bowling	3/19	2/15	3/48	3/16
Catches/stumpings	27/–	14/–	84/–	85/–
- Source: ESPNcricinfo, 17 January 2023

Farhaan Behardien (born 9 October 1983) is a South African former international cricketer who played ODIs and T20Is. On 10 January 2017, Behardien was appointed as the T20I captain for the Sri Lanka tour.

== Early and domestic career ==
He also plays for Nashua Titans. He made both his first-class and List-A cricket debuts in the 2004–05 season. Behardien is an aggressive right-handed batsman and a useful bowler, as well as an athletic fielder.

In July 2009, Behardien travelled to Australia for a three-week tour with the South African emerging squad. He also represented South Africa at the 2009 Hong Kong Sixes tournament, where he hit a six of the final ball to lead South Africa to victory in the final against Hong Kong.

In the first half of the 2009 season Behardian played as an overseas player for Bovey Tracey. He had a role as coach of their under-13 side.

In May 2017, he was named T20 Challenge Player of the Season at Cricket South Africa's annual awards.

In June 2018, he was named in the squad for the Titans team for the 2018–19 season. In September 2018, he was named in the Titans' squad for the 2018 Abu Dhabi T20 Trophy. In the same month he also scored his 6,000th run in first-class cricket, batting for Titans in the 2018–19 CSA 4-Day Franchise Series.

In October 2018, he was named in Cape Town Blitz's squad for the first edition of the Mzansi Super League T20 tournament. In September 2019, he was named in the squad for the Nelson Mandela Bay Giants team for the 2019 Mzansi Super League tournament. In April 2021, he was named in Free State's squad, ahead of the 2021–22 cricket season in South Africa.

== International career ==
He made his T20I debut for South Africa against India in early 2012. He scored 20* from 11 deliveries faced. Behardien also earned himself a place in the South African squad for the 2012 ICC World Twenty20. He played in the South African ODI squad in 2014. He played an important knock of 65*.

== Retirement ==
In December 2022, Behardien announced his retirement from international cricket. He expressed his decision putting a retirement note on Twitter.
