= Aubrey Swanepoel =

South African cricketer (born 1989)

Personal information
- Born: 18 June 1989 (age 37); Kimberley, South Africa
- Source: Cricinfo, 4 September 2015

Aubrey Swanepoel (born 18 June 1989) is a South African first-class cricketer. He was included in the Griqualand West cricket team for the 2015 Africa T20 Cup. In September 2018, he was named in Northern Cape's squad for the 2018 Africa T20 Cup.

In September 2019, Swanepoel was named as the captain of Northern Cape's squad for the 2019–20 CSA Provincial T20 Cup. In April 2021, he was named in Northern Cape's squad, ahead of the 2021–22 cricket season in South Africa.
