= Henry Davids =

South African cricketer

Personal information
- Full name: Henry Davids
- Born: 19 January 1980 (age 46); Stellenbosch, Cape Province, South Africa
- Batting: Right-handed
- Bowling: Right-arm medium-fast
- Role: Batsman

International information
- National side: South Africa (2012–2013)
- ODI debut (cap 111): 30 November 2013 v Pakistan
- Last ODI: 11 December 2013 v India
- ODI shirt no.: 19
- T20I debut (cap 53): 21 December 2012 v New Zealand
- Last T20I: 20 November 2013 v Pakistan

Domestic team information
- Years: Team
- 2000–2010: Boland
- 2005–2010: Cape Cobras
- 2010–present: Northerns
- 2010–present: Titans

Career statistics
Competition	ODI	T20I	FC	LA
Matches	2	9	132	166
Runs scored	8	161	6,990	5,146
Batting average	4.00	17.88	31.06	33.20
100s/50s	0/0	0/2	12/40	9/34
Top score	7	68	158	166
Balls bowled	–	12	3,905	1,953
Wickets	–	1	51	41
Bowling average	–	13.00	43.66	44.39
5 wickets in innings	–	0	1	0
10 wickets in match	–	0	0	0
Best bowling	–	1/6	5/22	4/43
Catches/stumpings	0/–	0/–	117/–	64/–
- Source: CricketArchive, 1 April 2017

Henry Davids (born 19 January 1980) is a South African cricketer. A right-handed batsman and a useful right-arm medium-fast bowler, Davids started his career with the Boland cricket team and then moved to the Nashua Cape Cobras. He performed well in the 2009 Champions League Twenty20 for the Cobras, finishing in the top-ten run-scorers in the competition with 137 runs at a strike-rate of 110.48. Davids then moved to the Nashua Titans at the end of the 2009 season and has had reasonable success, often appearing for the Easterns amateur team. He was appointed first-class captain of the Nashua Titans at the start of the 2012/13 season.

On 21 December 2012 he made his debut for the South African T20 team opening against New Zealand. In his second game he scored 55 runs from 38 balls. He is a well-talented, stable but aggressive right-handed batsman. He played a crucial role in the qualification of Cape Cobras in the inaugural edition of Champions LeagueT20 which was held in India and was in action in three cities (Bangalore, Hyderabad, Delhi).

In May 2017, he was named List A Cricketer of the Season at Cricket South Africa's annual awards. In August 2017, he was named in Stellenbosch Monarchs' squad for the first season of the T20 Global League. However, in October 2017, Cricket South Africa initially postponed the tournament until November 2018, with it being cancelled soon after.

In June 2018, he was named in the squad for the Titans team for the 2018–19 season. In September 2018, he was named in the Titans' squad for the 2018 Abu Dhabi T20 Trophy. In October 2018, he was named in Paarl Rocks' squad for the first edition of the Mzansi Super League T20 tournament. In September 2019, he was named in the squad for the Paarl Rocks team for the 2019 Mzansi Super League tournament.
