= Rudi Second =

South African cricketer

Personal information
- Full name: Rudi Stewart Second
- Born: 17 July 1989 (age 37); Queenstown, Cape Province, South Africa
- Batting: Right-handed
- Bowling: Right-arm offbreak
- Role: All-rounder

International information
- National side: South Africa
- Source: Cricinfo, 8 March 2020

Rudi Second (born 17 July 1989) is a South African cricketer who plays for the Knights cricket team. In August 2017, he was named in Cape Town Knight Riders' squad for the first season of the T20 Global League. However, in October 2017, Cricket South Africa initially postponed the tournament until November 2018, with it being cancelled soon after.

In September 2018, he was named in Free State's squad for the 2018 Africa T20 Cup. He was the joint-leading run-scorer for Free State in the tournament, with 155 runs in four matches. The following month, he was named in Nelson Mandela Bay Giants' squad for the first edition of the Mzansi Super League T20 tournament.

In August 2019, he was named in South Africa's Test squad for their series against India. However, later the same month, he was ruled out of the tour due to an injury. In December 2019, he was named in South Africa's Test squad for their series against England. In April 2021, he was named in Eastern Province's squad, ahead of the 2021–22 cricket season in South Africa.
