= Dane Vilas =

South African cricketer (born 1985)

Personal information
- Full name: Dane James Vilas
- Born: 10 June 1985 (age 41); Johannesburg, Transvaal, South Africa
- Nickname: Villa, Vili
- Batting: Right-handed
- Role: Wicket-keeper

International information
- National side: South Africa (2012–2016)
- Test debut (cap 322): 30 July 2015 v Bangladesh
- Last Test: 14 January 2016 v England
- Only T20I (cap 51): 30 March 2012 v India
- T20I shirt no.: 33

Domestic team information
- Years: Team
- 2006/07–2009/10: Gauteng
- 2008/09–2009/10: Lions
- 2010/11–2021/22: Western Province
- 2010/11–2016/17: Cape Cobras
- 2016/17: South Western Districts
- 2017–2023: Lancashire (squad no. 33)
- 2017/18–2018/19: Dolphins
- 2017/18: KwaZulu-Natal Inland
- 2018: Jozi Stars
- 2019: Durban Heat
- 2020: Lahore Qalandars
- 2021: Northern Superchargers
- 2023–2024: Paarl Royals

Career statistics
Competition	Test	T20I	FC	LA
Matches	6	1	199	185
Runs scored	94	–	10,633	5,292
Batting average	10.44	–	39.97	36.75
100s/50s	0/0	–	25/47	10/27
Top score	26	–	266	166
Catches/stumpings	13/0	0/0	471/20	177/30
- Source: ESPNcricinfo, 13 September 2023

Dane James Vilas (born 10 June 1985) is a South African former cricketer now cricket coach. He was born in Johannesburg, Transvaal. Previously, he played for South Africa's national team and made his Test debut for South Africa against Bangladesh on 30 July 2015.

== Domestic career ==
After four successful seasons at the Lions, Vilas moved to the Cape Cobras in search of more opportunity due to the emergence of Thami Tsolekile and Quinton de Kock at his former club.

On 27 January 2017, he signed a Kolpak deal with Lancashire, thus ruling him out of selection for South Africa.

In August 2017, he was named in Pretoria Mavericks' squad for the first season of the T20 Global League. However, in October 2017, Cricket South Africa initially postponed the tournament until November 2018, with it being cancelled soon after.

In October 2018, he was named in Jozi Stars' squad for the first edition of the Mzansi Super League T20 tournament. In September 2019, he was named in the squad for the Durban Heat team for the 2019 Mzansi Super League tournament.

Ahead of the 2019 season, he was appointed as captain of Lancashire County Cricket Club in all three formats of the game He led the county to promotion from Division 2 of the 2019 County Championship. Ahead of the 2023 season, Vilas stepped down from his role as captain, relinquishing the title to teammate Keaton Jennings. However, due to a hamstring injury sustained by Jennings in the early stages of the season, Vilas regained the captaincy on a temporary basis.

In May 2022, in the 2022 County Championship in England, Vilas scored his 10,000th run in first-class cricket, in the Roses Match against Yorkshire.

He announced his retirement from county cricket at the end of the 2023 season, but continued to play in the South African T20 competition.

== International career ==
Vilas made his international debut against India in a one-off Twenty20 International. He then went with the South African team to a triangular between Bangladesh and Zimbabwe. However, Vilas appeared to be out of form, and has not been picked for the T20 team since, with South African limited-overs captain AB de Villiers the new wicket-keeper.

In July 2015, he made his Test debut against Bangladesh at Sher-e-Bangla National Cricket Stadium in Mirpur. The match was caught in a cyclone with four days washed out, and the series was drawn at 0–0. He was a late replacement for Quinton de Kock in the third Test against England on 14 January 2016, after de Kock suffered an injury before play started. Vilas arrived 45 minutes after the start of the match, after flying from Port Elizabeth to Johannesburg.

== Other ==
Vilas appeared in the 2008 film Hansie, about the life of former South African cricket captain Hansie Cronje. He was cast as fast bowler Allan Donald by the producers, who wanted to add authenticity to on-field scenes by using real cricketers.

== Coaching career ==
Vilas was named as interim head coach at Middlesex County Cricket Club in June 2025.
