= Tshwane Spartans =

Former South African cricket team

Personnel
- Captain: Heinrich Klaasen
- Coach: Mark Boucher

Team information
- City: Centurion, Gauteng, South Africa
- Founded: 2018
- Dissolved: 2021
- Home ground: SuperSport Park, Centurion
T20I kit

Tshwane Spartans were a city-based franchise team of the South African Mzansi Super League (MSL) Twenty20 cricket tournament. The team was based at SuperSport Park in Centurion.

Tshwane Spartans played in the first two editions of the MSL in 2018 and 2019, before COVID-19 delayed the competition in 2020. The team finished as runners up in 2019 but were dissolved in 2021 in response to the reform of the domestic structure of South African cricket. All six of the original city-based franchise teams in the Mzansi Super League were to have been replaced by eight new teams based around the new South African domestic structure, but the league itself was later cancelled and replaced by a new franchise competition, the SA20, beginning in the 2022/23 season.
