= Lubabalo Gcuma =

South African cricket umpire (born 1976)

Personal information
- Full name: Lubabalo Babalo Gcuma
- Born: 13 May 1976 (age 50); Durban, South Africa
- Role: Umpire

Umpiring information
- ODIs umpired: 1 (2024)
- T20Is umpired: 24 (2023–2025)
- WODIs umpired: 13 (2011–2025)
- WT20Is umpired: 7 (2011–2021)
- Source: ESPNcricinfo, 22 February 2023

Lubabalo Gcuma (born 13 May 1976) is a South African cricket umpire. He has stood in matches in the Sunfoil Series tournament. He is part of Cricket South Africa's umpire panel for first-class matches. He has officiated in 10 women's ODIs and seven women's T20Is.

== See also ==
- List of One Day International cricket umpires
- List of Twenty20 International cricket umpires
