= JJ Smuts =

South African–Italian cricketer (born 1988)

Personal information
- Full name: Jon-Jon Trevor Smuts
- Born: 21 September 1988 (age 38); Grahamstown, Cape Province, South Africa
- Batting: Right-handed
- Bowling: Slow left-arm orthodox
- Role: Batting all-rounder
- Relatives: Kelly Smuts (brother)

International information
- National sides: South Africa (2017–2021); Italy (2026)
- ODI debut (cap 135): 4 February 2020; South Africa v England
- Last ODI: 7 April 2021; South Africa v Pakistan
- T20I debut (cap 69/47): 20 January 2017; South Africa v Sri Lanka
- Last T20I: 19 February 2026; Italy v West Indies

Domestic team information
- Years: Team
- 2006/07–2021/22: Eastern Province
- 2007/08–2020/21: Warriors (squad no. 21)
- 2016: St Kitts and Nevis Patriots
- 2018–2019: Nelson Mandela Bay Giants
- 2022/23–present: KwaZulu-Natal Coastal
- 2023: Sunrisers Eastern Cape
- 2024–present: Durban's Super Giants
- 2026: Edinburgh Castle Rockers

Career statistics
Competition	ODI	T20I	FC	LA
Matches	6	20	118	175
Runs scored	200	257	6,315	5,745
Batting average	50.00	13.52	32.89	36.36
100s/50s	0/1	0/0	10/33	9/38
Top score	84	45	156	173*
Balls bowled	180	289	12,468	5,889
Wickets	4	7	206	123
Bowling average	41.00	49.57	31.66	38.74
5 wickets in innings	0	0	7	0
10 wickets in match	0	0	2	0
Best bowling	2/42	2/18	6/47	4/4
Catches/stumpings	3/–	4/–	64/–	51/–
- Source: Cricinfo, 25 September 2026

Jon-Jon Trevor Smuts (born 21 September 1988) is a South African–born Italian cricketer who plays for Italy and has previously represented South Africa in international cricket. He plays for the Warriors in the South African domestic competitions.

He is a right-handed opening batsman and a slow left-arm bowler. In 2010 he was selected for the South African Emerging Players' squad to tour Australia. In the 2018 South African Cricket Annual, he was named as one of the five Cricketers of the Year. He is the brother of cricket player Kelly Smuts.

== Domestic and T20 career ==
In the 2010/11 South African domestic season he was named the Chevrolet Warriors cricketer of the season. He was included in the Eastern Province cricket team squad for the 2015 Africa T20 Cup.

In October 2018, he was named in Nelson Mandela Bay Giants' squad for the first edition of the Mzansi Super League T20 tournament. He was the leading run-scorer for the team in the tournament, with 219 runs in nine matches.

In July 2019, he was selected to play for the Glasgow Giants in the inaugural edition of the Euro T20 Slam cricket tournament. However, the following month the tournament was cancelled. In September 2019, he was named in the squad for the Nelson Mandela Bay Giants team for the 2019 Mzansi Super League tournament. In April 2021, he was named in Eastern Province's squad, ahead of the 2021–22 cricket season in South Africa.

== International career ==
=== South Africa ===
In January 2017 he was included in South Africa's Twenty20 International (T20I) squad for their series against Sri Lanka. He made his T20I debut for South Africa against Sri Lanka on 20 January 2017. In August 2017, he was named in Nelson Mandela Bay Stars' squad for the first season of the T20 Global League. However, in October 2017, Cricket South Africa initially postponed, and later cancelled the tournament. In January 2020, he was selected for South Africa's One Day International (ODI) squad for their series against England. He made his ODI debut on 4 February 2020, for South Africa against England.

=== Italy ===
Smuts became eligible to play for Italy through his wife's heritage. In January 2026, he was named in Italy's squad for the 2026 Men's T20 World Cup.

Smuts made his Twenty20 International (T20I) debut for Italy on 23 January 2026, in the T20I series against Ireland in the UAE.
