= Durban Heat =

Personnel
- Captain: Dane Vilas
- Coach: Gary Kirsten

Team information
- City: Durban, KwaZulu-Natal, South Africa
- Founded: 2018
- Dissolved: 2021
- Home ground: Kingsmead, Durban
T20I kit

Durban Heat were a franchise team of the South African Mzansi Super League (MSL) Twenty20 cricket tournament. The team were based at the Kingsmead Cricket Ground in Durban.

Durban Heat played in the first two editions of the MLS in 2018 and 2019, before COVID-19 delayed the competition in 2020. The franchise was dissolved in 2021 in response to the reform of the domestic structure of South African cricket. All six of the original city-based franchise teams in the Mzansi Super League were to have been replaced by eight new teams based around the new South African domestic structure, but the league itself was later cancelled and replaced by a new franchise competition, the SA20, beginning in the 2022/23 season.
