= Junior Dala =

South African cricketer

Personal information
- Full name: Carl Junior Dala
- Born: 29 December 1989 (age 36); Lusaka, Zambia
- Batting: Right-handed
- Bowling: Right–arm medium
- Role: Bowler

International information
- National side: South Africa (2018–present)
- ODI debut (cap 128): 8 August 2018 v Sri Lanka
- Last ODI: 10 February 2025 v New Zealand
- ODI shirt no.: 3
- T20I debut (cap 74): 18 February 2018 v India
- Last T20I: 11 February 2021 v Pakistan
- T20I shirt no.: 3

Domestic team information
- Years: Team
- 2011–2020: Titans
- 2018: Delhi Daredevils
- 2018–: Nelson Mandela Bay Giants
- 2023–present: Durban's Super Giants

Career statistics
Competition	ODI	T20I	FC	LA
Matches	3	10	77	98
Runs scored	8	19	701	448
Batting average	8.00	19.00	11.49	12.44
100s/50s	0/0	0/0	0/1	0/1
Top score	5	12*	79*	62
Balls bowled	150	192	9,936	3,926
Wickets	2	13	211	133
Bowling average	84.00	23.61	30.52	29.12
5 wickets in innings	0	0	8	2
10 wickets in match	0	0	0	0
Best bowling	1/47	3/35	6/35	6/19
Catches/stumpings	1/–	3/–	24/–	33/–
- Source: ESPNcricinfo, 13 April 2025

Carl Junior Dala (born 29 December 1989) is a South African cricketer. In the 2018 South African Cricket Annual, he was named as one of the five Cricketers of the Year.

== Domestic career ==
Dala was included in the Easterns cricket team squad for the 2015 Africa T20 Cup. In August 2017, he was named in Durban Qalandars' squad for the first season of the T20 Global League. However, in October 2017, Cricket South Africa initially postponed the tournament until November 2018, with it being cancelled soon after.

On 26 April 2018, Dala was called upon to replace the injured fellow South African seamer, Chris Morris for the Delhi Daredevils team for the rest of the 2018 IPL season.

In June 2018, Dala was named in the squad for the Titans team for the 2018–19 season. In October 2018, he was named in Nelson Mandela Bay Giants' squad for the first edition of the Mzansi Super League T20 tournament. In March 2019, in the semi-finals of the 2018–19 Momentum One Day Cup, he took career best figures of 6/19 against Cape Cobras, to help Titans progress to the final of the tournament.

In August 2019, Dala was named the Momentum One-Day Cup Cricketer of the Season at Cricket South Africa's annual award ceremony. In September 2019, he was named in the squad for the Nelson Mandela Bay Giants team for the 2019 Mzansi Super League tournament. In April 2021, he was named in Northerns' squad, ahead of the 2021–22 cricket season in South Africa.

== International career ==
In February 2018, Dala was named in South Africa's Twenty20 International (T20I) squad for their series against India. He made his T20I debut against India on 18 February 2018. In June 2018, he was named in South Africa's One Day International (ODI) squad for their series against Sri Lanka. He made his ODI debut against Sri Lanka on 8 August 2018.
