= Johan Cloete =

South African cricket umpire (born 1971)

Personal information
- Full name: Johannes Daniel Cloete
- Born: 21 July 1971 (age 55); Klerksdorp, Transvaal, South Africa
- Role: Umpire

Umpiring information
- ODIs umpired: 60 (2009–2016)
- T20Is umpired: 23 (2010–2016)
- Source: ESPNCricinfo, 26 March 2016

Johan Cloete (born 21 July 1971) is a South African cricket umpire. He was on the ICC International Panel of Umpires until July 2016. As of March 2016, he had stood in 60 One Day Internationals and 23 Twenty20 Internationals.

He was selected as one of the twenty umpires to stand in matches during the 2015 Cricket World Cup and officiated in three matches as an on-field umpire during the tournament. He is part of Cricket South Africa's umpire panel for first-class matches.

== See also ==
- List of One Day International cricket umpires
- List of Twenty20 International cricket umpires
