= Paarl Rocks =

Personnel
- Captain: Faf du Plessis
- Coach: Adrian Birrell

Team information
- City: Paarl, Western Cape, South Africa
- Founded: 2018
- Home ground: Boland Park, Paarl
T20I kit

Paarl Rocks are a franchise team of the South African Mzansi Super League Twenty20 cricket tournament founded in 2018. The team was based at Boland Park in Paarl. The coach was Adrian Birrell.

Paarl Rocks played in the first two editions of the MLS in 2018 and 2019, before COVID-19 delayed the competition in 2020. The team won the competition in 2019 but were dissolved in 2021 in response to the reform of the domestic structure of South African cricket. All six of the original city-based franchise teams in the Mzansi Super League were to have been replaced by eight new teams based around the new South African domestic structure, but the league itself was later cancelled and replaced by a new franchise competition, the SA20, beginning in the 2022/23 season.
