= Nelson Mandela Bay Giants =

Personnel
- Captain: JJ Smuts
- Coach: Eric Simons

Team information
- City: Port Elizabeth, Eastern Cape, South Africa
- Founded: 2018
- Dissolved: 2021
- Home ground: St George's Park, Port Elizabeth
T20I kit

Nelson Mandela Bay Giants were a franchise team of the South African Mzansi Super League Twenty20 cricket tournament. The team was based at the St George's Park Cricket Ground in Port Elizabeth.

Nelson Mandela Bay Giants played in the first two editions of the MSL in 2018 and 2019, before COVID-19 delayed the competition in 2020. The side was dissolved in 2021 in response to the reform of the domestic structure of South African cricket. All six of the original city-based franchise teams in the Mzansi Super League were to have been replaced by eight new teams based around the new South African domestic structure, but the league itself was later cancelled and replaced by a new franchise competition, the SA20, beginning in the 2022/23 season.
