= 2022–23 CSA 4-Day Series =

Cricket tournament

- Dates: 20 October 2022 – 15 March 2023
- Administrator: Cricket South Africa
- Cricket format: First-class
- Tournament format: Single round-robin
- Champions: Dolphins (2nd title)
- Participants: 15
- Matches: 49
- Most runs: Div 1: Matthew Breetzke (727); Div 2: Rivaldo Moonsamy (591)
- Most wickets: Div 1: Beyers Swanepoel (33); Div 2: Thomas Kaber (35)

The 2022–23 CSA 4-Day Series was a first-class cricket competition took place in South Africa from October 2022 to March 2023. It was the second edition of the post-franchise era and retained the two-division league format introduced the previous year, with the teams in each division unchanged.

The Division 2 teams of Limpopo and Mpumalanga were re-awarded first-class status in October 2022, meaning that unlike the previous year all matches played in the competition would be considered first-class cricket.

== Points Table ==
=== Division 1 ===
Pos	Team	Pld	W	D	L	Pts
1	Dolphins (C)	7	4	1	2	118.04
2	Warriors	7	4	1	2	117.72
3	Titans	7	4	2	1	117.20
4	Lions	7	3	3	1	110.50
5	Western Province	7	2	2	3	92.54
6	Knights	7	2	2	3	75.92
7	Boland	7	0	4	3	49.82
8	North West	7	0	3	4	43.22

Source: ESPNcricinfo

(C) Champions

=== Division 2 ===
Pos	Team	Pld	W	D	L	Pts
1	Northern Cape	6	3	3	0	113.54
2	KwaZulu-Natal (Inland)	6	3	2	1	103.68
3	Easterns	6	3	1	2	96.10
4	Border	6	3	1	2	96.06
5	Limpopo	6	3	0	3	86.10
6	South Western Districts	6	1	2	3	57.10
7	Mpumalanga	6	0	1	5	39.48

Source: ESPNcricinfo
Rules for classification: Points system: 16 for a win, 8 for a tie, 6 for a draw.
- Batting bonus points: in the first innings only, 1 point for reaching 150 runs, then 0.02 points for each run thereafter.
- Bowling bonus points: in the first innings only, 1 point for taking three wickets, then 1 point for each two wickets thereafter.

== Fixtures ==
=== Division 1 ===
==== Round 1 ====
10–12 November 2022
Scorecard

Boland	v	Warriors
332 (84.2 overs); Janneman Malan 132 (207); Glenton Stuurman 5/72 (18 overs)		161 (54.2 overs); Jordan Hermann 44 (48); Achille Cloete 5/27 (16.2 overs)
198 (64 overs); Shaun von Berg 51 (103); Glenton Stuurman 4/35 (15 overs)		370/3 (95.3 overs); Jordan Hermann 187* (281); Hardus Viljoen 1/63 (18 overs)

Warriors won by 7 wickets
Boland Park, Paarl
Umpires: Abdoellah Steenkamp and Thomas Mokorosi

- Boland won the toss and elected to bat.
- Achille Cloete (Boland) took his maiden five-wicket haul in first-class cricket.
- Points: Warriors 21.24, Boland 8.64.

10–13 November 2022
Scorecard

North West	v	Knights
94/1 (28 overs); Grant Mokoena 78* (102); Gerald Coetzee 1/16 (7 overs)

Match drawn
Mangaung Oval, Bloemfontein
Umpires: Bongani Jele and Stephen Harris

- Knights won the toss and elected to field.
- Only 28 overs of play were possible on day 1 due to rain.
- No play was possible on days 2 through 4 due to rain.
- Points: North West 6.00, Knights 6.00.

10–13 November 2022
Scorecard

Western Province	v	Titans
328 (84.1 overs); Kyle Verreynne 87 (116); Dayyaan Galiem 3/63 (15 overs)		140/6 (50.3 overs); Neil Brand 66* (153); Beuran Hendricks 3/29 (12 overs)

Match drawn
Centurion Park, Centurion
Umpires: Allahudien Paleker and Brad White

- Titans won the toss and elected to field.
- Only 6.1 and 40 overs of play were possible on days 2 and 3 respectively due to rain.
- No play was possible on day 4 due to rain.
- Points: Western Province 12.56, Titans 10.00.

==== Round 2 ====
17–20 November 2022
Scorecard

Warriors	v	Dolphins
166 (49.2 overs); Jordan Hermann 51 (83); Ottniel Baartman 3/21 (14 overs)		285 (85.2 overs); Andile Phehlukwayo 68 (142); Ziyaad Abrahams 3/50 (18 overs)
390 (118.3 overs); Diego Rosier 136 (259); Daryn Dupavillon 2/117 (29 overs)		202 (83.4 overs); Jason Smith 37 (112); Beyers Swanepoel 4/28 (15.4 overs)

Warriors won by 69 runs
St George's Park, Gqeberha
Umpires: Abongile Sodumo and Arno Jacobs

- Warriors won the toss and elected to bat.
- Points: Warriors 21.32, Dolphins 7.70

17–20 November 2022
Scorecard

Lions	v	North West
362 (115.5 overs); Wiaan Mulder 115* (191); Senuran Muthusamy 4/86 (36 overs)		169 (56.5 overs); Lesego Senokwane 56 (119); Bjorn Fortuin 4/43 (20 overs)
203/8d (64 overs); Ryan Rickelton 100* (164); Renaldo Meyer 3/33 (12 overs)		273 (108 overs); Delano Potgieter 81* (111); Sisanda Magala 4/34 (16 overs)

Lions won by 123 runs
Senwes Park, Potchefstroom
Umpires: Ryan Hendricks and Siphelele Gasa

- Lions won the toss and elected to bat.
- Points: Lions 24.14, North West 4.38.

17–19 November 2022
Scorecard

Titans	v	Knights
648 (128.5 overs); Heinrich Klaasen 292 (240); Nealan van Heerden 5/111 (27 overs)		243 (65 overs); Gihahn Cloete 50 (91); Lizaad Williams 4/56 (16 overs)
		263 (73 overs) (f/o); Pite van Biljon 73 (126); Simon Harmer 4/84 (29 overs)

Titans won by an innings and 142 runs
Centurion Park, Centurion
Umpires: Mazizi Gampu and Stephen Harris

- Knights won the toss and elected to field.
- Points: Titans 27.76, Knights 5.86.

17–19 November 2022
Scorecard

Western Province	v	Boland
557/5d (125 overs); Tony de Zorzi 163 (241); Hardus Viljoen 2/110 (28 overs)		202 (57.3 overs); Stiaan van Zyl 62 (88); Dane Paterson 3/41 (12.3 overs)
		145 (61 overs) (f/o); Shaun von Berg 47 (62); Dane Paterson 3/20 (13 overs)

Western Province won by an innings and 210 runs
Newlands, Cape Town
Umpires: Adrian Holdstock and Shaun George

- Western Province won the toss and elected to bat.
- Points: Western Province 26.42, Boland 3.04.

==== Round 3 ====
24–27 November 2022
Scorecard

Boland	v	Dolphins
211 (65.3 overs); Clyde Fortuin 93* (145); JJ Smuts 5/55 (13.3 overs)		135/4 (47 overs); Sarel Erwee 76 (146); Shaun von Berg 3/56 (18 overs)

Match drawn
Kingsmead, Durban
Umpires: Dennis Smith and Lubabalo Gcuma

- Boland won the toss and elected to bat.
- Only 28 overs of play were possible on day 2 due to rain.
- No play was possible on days 3 and 4 due to rain.
- Points: Dolphins 11.26, Boland 9.22

24–27 November 2022
Scorecard

Lions	v	Titans
354 (111 overs); Ryan Rickelton 108* (248); Simon Harmer 7/83 (46 overs)		449 (104.3 overs); Theunis de Bruyn 101 (94); Duanne Olivier 3/62 (18 overs)
139 (40.4 overs); Kagiso Rapulana 28 (18); Simon Harmer 7/68 (20 overs)		46/0 (9.2 overs); Dean Elgar 25* (28); Reeza Hendricks 0/2 (1 overs)

Titans won by 10 wickets
Wanderers Stadium, Johannesburg
Umpires: Phillip Vosloo and Siphelele Gasa

- Lions won the toss and elected to bat.
- Points: Titans 25.76, Lions 7.06

24–26 November 2022
Scorecard

Warriors	v	North West
381 (111 overs); Matthew Breetzke 112* (233); Renaldo Meyer 5/90 (23 overs)		116 (41.5 overs); Nicky van den Bergh 53 (99); Beyers Swanepoel 4/19 (11.5 overs)
177/5d (57.3 overs); Matthew Breetzke 91 (143); Delano Potgieter 3/26 (15 overs)		203 (39.5 overs); Renaldo Meyer 42 (16); Marco Jansen 3/40 (13 overs)

Warriors won by 239 runs
St George's Park, Gqeberha
Umpires: Arno Jacobs and Shaun George

- North West won the toss and elected to field.
- Points: Warriors 24.76, North West 2.

24–26 November 2022
Scorecard

Knights	v	Western Province
111 (40.2 overs); Gihahn Cloete 29 (50); Beuran Hendricks 4/16 (9.2 overs)		575/7d (135.5 overs); Tony de Zorzi 304* (381); Gerald Coetzee 4/117 (27 overs)
309 (98.3 overs); Raynard van Tonder 117 (222); Dane Paterson 3/48 (16.3 overs)

Western Province won by an innings and 155 runs
Newlands, Cape Town
Umpires: Abdoellah Steenkamp and Adrian Holdstock

- Knights won the toss and elected to bat.
- Points: Western Province 26.2, Knights 2.

==== Round 4 ====
12–15 February 2023
Scorecard

Western Province	v	Dolphins
210 (64.3 overs); Edward Moore 51 (90); Prenelan Subrayen 3/62 (21.3 overs)		129 (52 overs); Slade van Staden 36 (61); Kyle Simmonds 6/42 (21 overs)
191 (69.2 overs); Kyle Simmonds 64 (88); Keshav Maharaj 7/75 (29.2 overs)		273/2 (88.2 overs); Bryce Parsons 134* (277); Tshepo Moreki 1/42 (15 overs)

Dolphins won by 8 wickets
Kingsmead, Durban
Umpires: Abdoellah Steenkamp and Abongile Sodumo

- Western Province won the toss and elected to bat.
- Points: Dolphins 20, Western Province 6.2

12–15 February 2023
Scorecard

Knights	v	Lions

Match Abandoned
Mangaung Oval, Bloemfontein
Umpires: Siphelele Gasa and Thomas Mokorosi

- No toss.
- No play was possible on any day due to wet-outfield.
- Points: Knights 5, Lions 5

12–15 February 2023
Scorecard

Boland	v	North West
234 (84.5 overs); Shaun von Berg 43 (62); Delano Potgieter 4/47 (15.5 overs)		269 (90.4 overs); Shaylen Pillay 110 (273); Achille Cloete 3/49 (22 overs)
200 (82.1 overs); Janneman Malan 76 (204); Delano Potgieter 5/43 (21 overs)		87/3 (24.5 overs); Lesego Senokwane 47* (72); Achille Cloete 2/15 (6.5 overs)

Match Drawn
Senwes Park, Potchefstroom
Umpires: Brad White and Ryan Hendricks

- Boland won the toss and elected to bat.
- Juan James (North West) made his first-class debut.
- Points: Boland 12.68, North West 13.38

==== Round 5 ====
19–22 February 2023
Scorecard

Western Province	v	North West
345/9 (90 overs); Kyle Simmonds 70* (75); Renaldo Meyer 4/74 (16.2 overs)

Match Drawn
Senwes Park, Potchefstroom
Umpires: Abongile Sodumo and Shaun George

- North West won the toss and elected to field.
- No play was possible on Day 1, 2 & 3 due to rain.
- Points: Western Province 10.9, North West 10

19–22 February 2023
Scorecard

Warriors	v	Lions
438 (127.5 overs); Sinethemba Qeshile 124 (215); Lutho Sipamla 4/77 (18.5 overs)		433 (102.3 overs); Ryan Rickelton 125 (112); Glenton Stuurman 3/73 (22 overs)
255/7 (73 overs); Matthew Breetzke 102* (180); Kagiso Rabada 3/26 (12 overs)

Match Drawn
Wanderers Stadium, Johannesburg
Umpires: Arno Jacobs and Phillip Vosloo

- Warriors won the toss and elected to bat.
- Points: Warriors 13.78, Lions 14.08

19–22 February 2023
Scorecard

Titans	v	Boland

Match Abandoned
Tshwane University of Technology Oval, Pretoria
Umpires: Allahudien Paleker and Thomas Mokorosi

- No toss.
- No play was possible on any day due to rain.
- Points: Titans 5, Boland 5

19–22 February 2023
Scorecard

Dolphins	v	Knights
253 (74.5 overs); Eathan Bosch 53 (71); Gerald Coetzee 5/56 (15 overs)		165 (78 overs); Matthew Kleinveldt 43 (73); Keshav Maharaj 5/62 (32 overs)
336/6d (77.4 overs); Sarel Erwee 132 (141); Patrick Kruger 2/29 (12 overs)		145 (58.3 overs); Raynard van Tonder 63 (157); Keshav Maharaj 6/43 (17.3 overs)

Dolphins won by 279 runs
Mangaung Oval, Bloemfontein
Umpires: Bongani Jele and Brad White

- Dolphins won the toss and elected to bat.
- Andile Simelane (Dolphins) and Monde Maqunqu (Knights) both made their first-class debut.
- Points: Dolphins 23.06, Knights 5.3

==== Round 6 ====
26 February – 1 March 2023
Scorecard

Titans	v	Dolphins
165 (46.3 overs); Corbin Bosch 54 (53); Prenelan Subrayen 7/52 (17 overs)		253 (92.3 overs); Jason Smith 82 (222); Smangaliso Nhlebela 5/74 (29.3 overs)
138 (50.1 overs); Neil Brand 50 (151); JJ Smuts 5/67 (18.1 overs)		51/3 (15.3 overs); Bryce Parsons 25 (45); Donavon Ferreira 3/17 (7.3 overs)

Dolphins won by 7 wickets
Kingsmead, Durban
Umpires: Arno Jacobs and Lubabalo Gcuma

- Titans won the toss and elected to bat.
- Dewald Brevis (Titans) made his first-class debut.
- Points: Dolphins 23.06, Titans 5.2

26 February – 1 March 2023
Scorecard

Knights	v	Warriors
422 (103 overs); Gihahn Cloete 93 (133); Beyers Swanepoel 5/82 (22 overs)		134 (42.2 overs); Sinethemba Qeshile 25 (62); Patrick Kruger 5/21 (10.2 overs)
157 (47.5 overs); Migael Pretorius 46 (65); Beyers Swanepoel 5/35 (15.5 overs)		284 (91.2 overs); Matthew Breetzke 111 (213); Nhlakanipho Mpungose 4/46 (19.2 overs)

Knights won by 161 runs
St George's Park, Gqeberha
Umpires: Abdoellah Steenkamp and Brad White

- Knights won the toss and elected to bat.
- Concussion Substitutes:
1. Orapeleng Motlhoaring for Migael Pretorius (Knights)
2. Tiaan van Vuuren for Glenton Stuurman (Warriors)
3. Tristan Stubbs for Jordan Hermann (Warriors)
- Points: Knights 26.12, Warriors 4

26 February – 1 March 2023
Scorecard

Lions	v	Western Province
323 (86 overs); Bjorn Fortuin 123* (143); Beuran Hendricks 5/59 (14 overs)		423 (103.3 overs); Zubayr Hamza 129 (177); Lutho Sipamla 4/101 (26 overs)
315 (106.4 overs); Dominic Hendricks 80 (142); Tshepo Moreki 3/52 (19 overs)		187 (49 overs); Daniel Smith 61 (93); Bjorn Fortuin 6/69 (20 overs)

Lions won by 28 runs
Wanderers Stadium, Johannesburg
Umpires: Dennis Smith and Shaun George

- Lions won the toss and elected to bat.
- Connor Esterhuizen (Lions) made his first-class debut.
- Points: Lions 24.46, Western Province 10.3

==== Round 7 ====
5–8 March 2023
Scorecard

Dolphins	v	North West
348 (114.1 overs); Jason Smith 136 (248); Eldred Hawken 4/34 (22 overs)		173 (87 overs); JP King 33 (103); Prenelan Subrayen 5/67 (38 overs)
		104 (50.3 overs) (f/o); Duan Jansen 18* (27); JJ Smuts 5/54 (23 overs)

Dolphins won by an innings and 71 runs
St George's Park, Gqeberha
Umpires: Stephen Harris and Dennis Smith

- Dolphins won the toss and elected to bat.
- JP King (North West) made his first-class debut.
- Points: Dolphins 24.38, North West 3.46

5–8 March 2023
Scorecard

Boland	v	Lions
421 (121.3 overs); Mitchell Van Buuren 92 (159); Shaun von Berg 5/115 (34.3 overs)		93 (42.4 overs); Stiaan van Zyl 59 (116); Bjorn Fortuin 4/47 (19.4 overs)
		198/1 (57 overs) (f/o); Stiaan van Zyl 106* (184); Codi Yusuf 1/37 (12 overs)

Match drawn
Boland Park, Paarl
Umpires: Siphelele Gasa and Bongani Jele

- Lions won the toss and elected to bat.
- Points: Lions 15, Boland 8

5–8 March 2023
Scorecard

Warriors	v	Titans
281/8d (82.5 overs); Matthew Breetzke 68 (141); Neil Brand 3/55 (11.5 overs)		141/9d (57 overs); Jiveshan Pillay 45 (113); Glenton Stuurman 4/40 (17 overs)
134/4d (17 overs); Lesiba Ngoepe 45 (36); Donavon Ferreira 2/32 (5 overs)		275/6 (60.4 overs); Donavon Ferreira 116* (103); Beyers Swanepoel 4/55 (13 overs)

Titans won by 4 wickets
Kingsmead, Durban
Umpires: Mazizi Gampu and Lubabalo Gcuma

- Titans won the toss and elected to field.
- Siya Plaatjie (Warriors) made his first-class debut.
- Points: Titans 19, Warriors 7.62

==== Round 8 ====
12–15 March 2023
Scorecard

Boland	v	Knights
212 (69.4 overs); Michael Copeland 55 (91); Aubrey Swanepoel 5/67 (24.4 overs)		493 (132 overs); Matthew Kleinveldt 199 (389); Shaun von Berg 5/101 (29 overs)
319 (94.4 overs); Clyde Fortuin 133 (208); Monde Maqunqu 6/82 (26.4 overs)		39/1 (6.1 overs); Pite van Biljon 23* (21); Imran Manack 1/20 (3.1 overs)

Knights won by 9 wickets
Boland Park, Paarl
Umpires: Ryan Hendricks and Dennis Smith

- Boland won the toss and elected to bat.
- Points: Knights 25.64, Boland 3.24

12–15 March 2023
Scorecard

Warriors	v	Western Province
352 (102 overs); Jordan Hermann 81 (117); Dane Paterson 3/53 (21 overs)		198 (75.2 overs); George Linde 63 (112); Siya Plaatjie 5/19 (11 overs)
184 (56.2 overs); Glenton Stuurman 38 (56); George Linde 3/25 (13 overs)		259 (71.4 overs); Kyle Verreynne 86 (112); Tsepo Ndwandwa 6/51 (16.4 overs)

Warriors won by 79 runs
Newlands, Cape Town
Umpires: Mazizi Gampu and Stephen Harris

- Warriors won the toss and elected to bat.
- Points: Warriors 25.02, Western Province 5.96

12–15 March 2023
Scorecard

Dolphins	v	Lions
329 (93.3 overs); Marques Ackerman 97 (116); Lutho Sipamla 5/71 (23 overs)		259 (105 overs); Malusi Siboto 54* (167); Thando Ntini 3/30 (20 overs)
222 (47.5 overs); Khaya Zondo 65 (76); Evan Jones 5/46 (10 overs)		296/7 (93.1 overs); Kagiso Rapulana 88 (161); Prenelan Subrayen 2/55 (23 overs)

Lions won by 3 wickets
Senwes Park, Potchefstroom
Umpires: Arno Jacobs and Phillip Vosloo

- Lions won the toss and elected to field.
- Liam Alder (Lions) made his first-class debut.
- Points: Lions 22.76, Dolphins 8.58

12–15 March 2023
Scorecard

North West	v	Titans
148 (56.2 overs); JP King 38 (79); Ayabulela Gqamane 3/40 (13 overs)		319 (81.4 overs); Sibonelo Makhanya 71 (134); Senuran Muthusamy 6/62 (24.4 overs)
360 (94.4 overs); JP King 92 (178); Matthew Boast 3/62 (19 overs)		190/1 (38.3 overs); Neil Brand 95* (117); Senuran Muthusamy 1/50 (15 overs)

Titans won by 9 wickets
Centurion Park, Centurion
Umpires: Lubabalo Gcuma and Abongile Sodumo

- North West won the toss and elected to bat.
- Matthew Boast (Titans) and Jan Coetzer (North West) both made their first-class debuts.
- Substitute: Juan James for Khanya Cotani (North West).
- Points: Titans 24.38, North West 4

=== Division 2 ===
==== Round 1 ====
20–23 October 2022
Scorecard

KwaZulu-Natal (Inland)	v	Mpumalanga
441/8d (112 overs); Thamsanga Kumalo 141 (242); Thula Ngcobo 3/80 (20 overs)		151 (53 overs); Blake Schraader 34 (79); Keith Dudgeon 4/34 (13 overs)
		218 (93 overs) (f/o); Rubin Hermann 53 (145); Stefan Tait 5/67 (17 overs)

KwaZulu-Natal Inland won by an innings and 72 runs
City Oval, Pietermaritzburg
Umpires: Jurie Sadler and Khatso Ntuli

- KwaZulu-Natal Inland won the toss and elected to bat.
- No play was possible on day 3 due to rain.
- Benjamin van Niekerk and Alexander Kok (Mpumalanga) both made their first-class debut.
- Points: KwaZulu-Natal Inland 25.40, Mpumalanga 4.02

20–22 October 2022
Scorecard

Northern Cape	v	Limpopo
238 (73.2 overs); Kelly Smuts 77 (94); Thomas Hobson 3/23 (12 overs)		170 (58 overs); Thomas Hobson 57* (115); Tshepo Ntuli 6/39 (17 overs)
361 (100.2 overs); Jason Oakes 61 (68); Ruan Haasbroek 3/49 (17 overs)		154 (44.2 overs); Liam Peters 43 (113); Tshepo Ntuli 5/47 (20 overs)

Northern Cape won by 275 runs
De Beers Diamond Oval, Kimberley
Umpires: Marlon Jansen and Roderick Ellis

- Limpopo won the toss and elected to field.
- Ludwig Kaestner, Liam Peters, Maphekgola Pootona, Ntokozo Mahlaba, Nyiko Shikwambana, and Thomas Hobson (Limpopo) all made their first-class debut.
- Points: Northern Cape 22.76, Limpopo 5.4

20–23 October 2022
Scorecard

Easterns	v	South Western Districts
291 (86.2 overs); Shane Dadswell 136 (169); Sean Whitehead 4/29 (15.2)		220 (79.1 overs); Mathew Christensen 100 (236); Amaan Khan 3/34 (18 overs)
159 (51.2 overs); Aron Visser 63 (121); Marcello Piedt 3/57 (14 overs)		157 (50.3 overs); Marcello Piedt 33 (40); Tumelo Simelane 5/61 (20.3 overs)

Easterns won by 73 runs
Willowmoore Park, Benoni
Umpires: Jan Erasmus and Lauren Agenbag

- South Western Districts won the toss and elected to field.
- Mekyle Pillay and Nico van Zyl (Easterns), and Jarred Jardine (South Western Districts) all made their first-class debut.
- Shane Dadswell scored his maiden century in first-class cricket.
- Points: Easterns 23.82, South Western Districts 6.40

==== Round 2 ====
3–6 November 2022
Scorecard

Mpumalanga	v	Northern Cape
383 (98.4 overs); Yassar Cook 163 (210); Grant Thomson 6/56 (17.4 overs)		620/8d (145.5 overs); Rivaldo Moonsamy 154 (158); Kieran Kenny 4/89 (24 overs)
82 (42.2 overs); Kieran Kenny 18 (55); Grant Thomson 4/11 (9 overs)

Northern Cape won by an innings and 155 runs
White River Country Club, White River
Umpires: Jan Erasmus and Philip Vosloo

- Northern Cape won the toss and elected to field.
- Caleb Balich and Gerald Ngwenyama (Mpumalanga) both made their first-class debut.
- Points: Northern Cape 26.02, Mpumalanga 7.66.

3–6 November 2022
Scorecard

KwaZulu-Natal (Inland)	v	Easterns
252 (91.2 overs); Tian Koekemoer 123 (205); Nico van Zyl 4/37 (19 overs)		197 (69.2 overs); Kabelo Sekhukhune 47 (73); Stefan Tait 4/59 (18 overs)
268/5d (77.3 overs); Michael Erlank 121 (182); Amaan Khan 4/35 (8.3 overs)		327/4 (73.3 overs); Mark Pearse 116 (105); Andile Mokgakane 1/15 (3 overs)

Easterns won by 6 wickets
Willowmoore Park, Benoni
Umpires: Abongile Sodumo and Ryan Hendricks

- Easterns won the toss and elected to field.
- Mark Pearse (Easterns) made his first-class debut.
- Mark Pearse (Easterns) scored his maiden century in first-class cricket.
- Points: Easterns 21.94, KwaZulu-Natal Inland 7.04.

==== Round 3 ====
10–12 November 2022
Scorecard

Northern Cape	v	Border
408 (108.1 overs); Rivaldo Moonsamy 148 (164); Joshua Dodd 4/56 (15.1)		135 (50.2 overs); Marco Marais 33 (57); Johannes van Dyk 3/24 (9 overs)
		165 (52 overs) (f/o); Joshua Dodd 33 (45); Andrew Rasemene 6/40 (15 overs)

Northern Cape won by an innings and 108 runs
De Beers Diamond Oval, Kimberley
Umpires: Godwin Von Willingh and Marlon Jansen

- Border won the toss and elected to field.
- Siphesihle Madlongolwana (Border) made his first-class debut.
- Andrew Rasemene took his maiden five-wicket haul in first-class cricket.
- Points: Northern Cape 25.58, Border 3.00

10–12 November 2022
Scorecard

Mpumalanga	v	Limpopo
230 (60 overs); Alexander Kok 77 (78); Zakhele Qwabe 5/60 (16 overs)		343 (91.1 overs); Sizwe Masondo 157 (184); Kieran Kenny 7/51 (15 overs)
144 (39 overs); Yassar Cook 41* (66); Sithembile Langa 5/49 (15 overs)		35/1 (9.5 overs); Ludwig Kaestner 13* (25); Kieran Kenny 1/4 (3 overs)

Limpopo won by 9 wickets
Polokwane Cricket Club Ground, Polokwane
Umpires: Jurie Sadler and Lauren Agenbag

- Limpopo won the toss and elected to field.
- Akhulile Mkatu and Nhlanhla Dlamini (Mpumalanga), and Morne Venter (Limpopo) all made their first-class debut.
- Kieran Kenny took his maiden five-wicket haul in first-class cricket.
- Points: Limpopo 24.86, Mpumalanga 6.60.

==== Round 4 ====
17–20 November 2022
Scorecard

KwaZulu-Natal (Inland)	v	Northern Cape
228 (84 overs); Dilivio Ridgaard 73 (200); Ernest Kemm 4/55 (19 overs)		316/9d (102 overs); Hanu Viljoen 106* (220); Stefan Tait 4/45 (22 overs)
75/1 (15.1 overs); Dilivio Ridgaard 23* (45); Romano Terblanche 1/19 (4 overs)

Match drawn
City Oval, Pietermaritzburg
Umpires: Dennis Smith and Lubabalo Gcuma

- KwaZulu-Natal Inland won the toss and elected to bat.
- No play was possible on day 1 due to rain.
- Only 23.5 overs of play were possible on day 3 due to rain.
- Hanu Viljoen scored his maiden century in first-class cricket.
- Points: KwaZulu-Natal Inland 12.56, Northern Cape 14.10.

17–20 November 2022
Scorecard

Limpopo	v	South Western Districts
274 (86.3 overs); Louren Steenkamp 136 (188); Andre Malan 3/41 (16 overs)		611/5d (178.1 overs); Onke Nyaku 201* (352); Sithembile Langa 2/66 (27 overs)
231 (88.1 overs); Ruan Haasbroek 63 (138); Sean Whitehead 4/79 (36.1 overs)

South Western Districts won by an innings and 106 runs
Recreation Ground, Oudtshoorn
Umpires: Andre Olivier and Warren Wyngaard

- Limpopo won the toss and elected to bat first.
- Skhonza Nxasana (Limpopo) made his first-class debut.
- Louren Steenkamp (Limpopo) scored his maiden century in first-class cricket.
- Points: South Western Districts 24.36, Limpopo 5.48

17–20 November 2022
Scorecard

Border	v	Easterns
336 (118.2 overs); Jerry Nqolo 67 (150); Mekyle Pillay 2/30 (14.2 overs)		231 (59.2 overs); Kabelo Sekhukhune 90* (138); Thomas Kaber 6/79 (21 overs)
194/7d (53 overs); Mncedisi Malika 52* (64); Nico van Zyl 3/35 (16 overs)		158 (53 overs); Mangaliso Mosehle 45 (61); Thomas Kaber 4/77 (19 overs)

Border won by 141 runs
Buffalo Park, East London
Umpires: Bongani Ntshebe and Gladman Gaseba

- Border won the toss and elected to bat.
- No play was possible on day 3 due to rain.
- Points: Border 23.46, Easterns 5.62

==== Round 5 ====
9–12 February 2023
Scorecard

KwaZulu-Natal (Inland)	v	Border
250 (74.3 overs); Tian Koekemoer 98 (175); Thomas Kaber 4/67 (21 overs)		267 (94.2 overs); Mncedisi Malika 50 (143); Stefan Tait 3/72 (21 overs)
119/4 (26 overs); Thamsanqa Khumalo 44 (80); Thomas Kaber 2/34 (9 overs)

Match Drawn
City Oval, Pietermaritzburg
Umpires: Godwin von Willingh and Warren Wyngaard

- Border won the toss and elected to field.
- No play was possible on Day 1 due to rain.
- Points: KwaZulu-Natal (Inland) 13, Border 13.34

9–12 February 2023
Scorecard

Mpumalanga	v	South Western Districts
101/1 (41 overs); Benjamin van Niekerk 50* (113); Sean Whitehead 1/21 (11 overs)

Match Drawn
White River Country Club, White River
Umpires: Andre Olivier and Marlon Jansen

- Mpumalanga won the toss and elected to bat.
- No play was possible on Day 2, 3 & 4 due to rain.
- Points: Mpumalanga 6, South Western Districts 6

==== Round 6 ====
23–26 February 2023
Scorecard

Northern Cape	v	Easterns
458 (140.4 overs); Ernest Kemm 117 (243); Kabelo Sekhukhune 3/27 (9.4 overs)		421 (152.1 overs); Wesley Coulentianos 128 (291); Ernest Kemm 7/112 (41.1 overs)
334/5d (67.1 overs); Rivaldo Moonsamy 126 (88); Tumelo Simelane 3/134 (25.1)

Match Drawn
De Beers Diamond Oval, Kimberley
Umpires: Jurie Sadler and Marais Erasmus

- Northern Cape won the toss and elected to bat.
- Points: Northern Cape 12.06, Easterns 11.72

23–26 February 2023
Scorecard

Limpopo	v	KwaZulu-Natal (Inland)
251 (76.1 overs); Ruan Haasbroek 45 (71); Stefan Tait 5/49 (17 overs)		483 (158.3 overs); Cameron Shekleton 125* (256); Ruan Haasbroek 5/105 (48.3 overs)
121 (47 overs); Morne Venter 31 (82); Stefan Tait 5/41 (14 overs)

KwaZulu-Natal (Inland) won by an innings and 111 runs
Polokwane Cricket Club Ground, Polokwane
Umpires: Gladman Gaseba and Khatso Ntuli

- Limpopo won the toss and elected to bat.
- Sello Malatji and Sahil Patel (Limpopo) both made their first-class debuts.
- Points: KwaZulu-Natal (Inland) 24.18, Limpopo 4.02

23–26 February 2023
Scorecard

South Western Districts	v	Border
165 (49 overs); Jhedli van Briesies 47 (94); Sinovuyo Ntuntwana 3/51 (12 overs)		349 (100.1 overs); Jason Niemand 168 (282); Pheko Moletsane 3/59 (18 overs)
244 (68.2 overs); Blayde Capell 52 (77); Phaphama Fojela 7/52 (20.2 overs)		61/0 (10.2 overs); Joshua van Heerden 32* (30)

Border won by 10 wickets
Buffalo Park, East London
Umpires: Bongani Ntshebe and Roderick Ellis

- Border won the toss and elected to field.
- Points: Border 24.98, South Western Districts 5.3

==== Round 7 ====
2–5 March 2023
Scorecard

Northern Cape	v	South Western Districts
274 (110.4 overs); Kelly Smuts 78 (129); Basheeru-Deen Walters 3/34 (22.4 overs)		125 (51.2 overs); Mathew Christensen 44 (133); Benjamin Van Rensburg 4/22 (13 overs)
256/5d (85 overs); Victor Mahlangu 69 (196); Pheko Moletsane 3/91 (25 overs)		132/6 (49 overs); Onke Nyaku 37* (78); Tshepo Ntuli 4/64 (22 overs)

Match drawn
Recreation Ground, Oudtshoorn
Umpires: Andre Olivier and Godwin Von Willingh

- Northern Cape won the toss and elected to bat.
- No play was possible on day 4 due to rain.
- Points: Northern Cape 12.24, South Western Districts 10

2–5 March 2023
Scorecard

Border	v	Limpopo
245 (86.4 overs); Joshua van Heerden 99 (131); Sithembile Langa 5/42 (21.4 overs)		305 (99.1 overs); Thomas Hobson 77 (169); Thomas Kaber 6/121 (33 overs)
140 (60.5 overs); Thomas Kaber 46* (140); Ruan Haasbroek 7/60 (27 overs)		81/4 (19.3 overs); Thomas Hobson 26* (37); Ruan Haasbroek 26 (37); Thomas Kaber 3/27 (7 overs)

Limpopo won by 6 wickets
Buffalo Park, East London
Umpires: Gladman Gaseba and Warren Wyngaard

- Limpopo won the toss and elected to field.
- Points: Limpopo 21.55, Border 5.95

2–5 March 2023
Scorecard

Mpumalanga	v	Easterns
304 (66 overs); Alexander Kok 87* (97); Nico van Zyl 4/41 (18 overs)		368 (84.2 overs); Mark Pearse 113 (94); Jon Hinrichsen 5/73 (25 overs)
350 (85.3 overs); Yassar Cook 87 (97); Divan Posthumus 5/80 (21.3 overs)		290/9 (69 overs); Kabelo Sekhukhune 77 (107); Muhammed Mayet 4/57 (14 overs)

Easterns won by 1 wickets
Willowmoore Park, Benoni
Umpires: Marlon Jansen and Roderick Ellis

- Easterns won the toss and elected to field.
- Neo Felane (Easterns) made his first-class debut.
- Points: Easterns 22.18, Mpumalanga 5.54

==== Round 8 ====
9–12 March 2023
Scorecard

Mpumalanga	v	Border
256 (68.3 overs); Muhammed Mayet 102 (167); Thomas Kaber 4/71 (18.3 overs)		321 (93.4 overs); Nonelela Yikha 104 (228); Alexander Kok 7/81 (35.4 overs)
180 (39.5 overs); Jurie Snyman 53 (59); Jade de Klerk 4/59 (16 overs)		118/2 (29 overs); Joshua van Heerden 47* (83); Thula Ngcobo 1/6 (4 overs)

Border won by 8 wickets
White River Country Club, White River
Umpires: Roger Burne and Khatso Ntuli

- Mpumalanga won the toss and elected to bat.
- Luco van der Walt (Mpumalanga) made his first-class debut.
- Points: Border 24.38, Mpumalanga 7.12

9–12 March 2023
Scorecard

Easterns	v	Limpopo
330 (91.3 overs); Kabelo Sekhukhune 102 (218); Zakhele Qwabe 5/76 (17 overs)		335 (135.4 overs); Morne Venter 138 (351); Divan Posthumus 4/50 (24.4 overs)
61 (28.1 overs); Danie Rossouw 13 (24); Thomas Hobson 6/10 (8.1 overs)		59/5 (13 overs); Thomas Hobson 15* (28); Divan Posthumus 3/18 (6 overs)

Limpopo won by 5 wickets
Polokwane Cricket Club Ground, Polokwane
Umpires: Lauren Agenbag and F. Von Willingh

- Easterns won the toss and elected to bat.
- Nhlanhla Mashigo (Easterns) made his first-class debut.
- Points: Limpopo 22.24, Easterns 7.64

9–12 March 2023
Scorecard

KwaZulu-Natal (Inland)	v	South Western Districts
175 (74.2 overs); Tian Koekemoer 38 (103); Andre Malan 5/38 (19 overs)		152 (82.3 overs); Blayde Capell 63 (186); Michael Erlank 4/54 (24 overs)
152 (69.1 overs); Michael Erlank 63 (142); Sean Whitehead 7/19 (12.1 overs)		138 (60.4 overs); Sean Whitehead 52* (93); Keith Dudgeon 5/30 (17 overs)

KwaZulu-Natal (Inland) won by 37 runs
Recreation Ground, Oudtshoorn
Umpires: Jan Erasmus and Jurie Sadler

- South Western Districts won the toss and elected to field.
- Points: Kwa-Zulu Natal (Inland) 21.5, South Western Districts 5.04
