= List of Limpopo representative cricketers =

This is a list of cricketers who have played first-class, List A cricket, or Twenty20 cricket for the Limpopo cricket team in South Africa.

Limpopo, which represents Limpopo province in the north-east of South Africa, was awarded first-class cricket status ahead of the 2006–07 cricket season and played in the Provincial Three-Day Challenge first-class competition and One-Day Cup for a single season. After losing five of their eight first-class matches, the team, along with Kei and Mpumalanga, lost their first-class status, Cricket South Africa (CSA) considering that their performance had been too weak for them to continue to hold first-class status. (Note: South Western Districts and KwaZulu-Natal Inland retained their first-class status having been awarded it at the same time as Limpopo, Kei, and Mpumalanga.)

The team played in the CSA Rural League during the 2010s, before being invited to take part in the 2018 Africa T20 Cup, making its top-class Twenty20 debut. From the 2019–20 season it competed in the CSA Provincial T20 Cup, the second division Twenty20 tournament, with matches holding official Twenty20 status. After a two-season trial period, during which Limpopo played in the second division first-class and List A competitions with the matches involving the team not considered to hold top-level status, it was promoted to first-class status again in October 2022, with matches played during the 2022–23 season having first-class or List A status. (Note: Mpumalanga competed on the same basis during this period and was promoted at the same time as Limpopo.)

This list includes the players who played first-class and List A cricket for Limpopo in 2006–07 and from 2022 to 2023, and Twenty20 cricket for the team from 2018 to 2019.

As of 14 July 2025

== A ==
- Andrea Agathangelou
- Jesse Albanie

== B ==
- Johan Barkhuizen
- Amir Bux

== C ==
- Hardus Coetzer

== D ==
- Johannes Diseko

== F ==
- Gerhardus Fourie

== G ==
- Andrew Galloway

== H ==
- Pieter Haasbroek
- Ruan Haasbroek
- Eldred Hawken
- Thomas Hobson
- Hendrik Holtzhausen

== J ==
- Theo Jansen van Rensburg

== K ==
- Ludwig Kaestner
- Ernest Kemm
- Lerato Kgoatle
- Christopher King

== L ==
- Sithembele Langa
- Kgoshi Leopeng
- Sonnyboy Letshela
- Sammy Letsoalo
- Gerhardus Lourens

== M ==
- Michael McNicol
- Ntokozo Mahlaba
- Sello Malatji
- Tshepo Mangena
- Ryno Marais
- Tumi Masekela
- Sipho Mashele
- Sizwe Masondo
- Artwell Mokgoloboto
- Kgaudise Molefe
- Thabo Mosefowa
- Alfred Mothoa
- Wisani Mushwana
- Sibusiso Mxube

== N ==
- Shelton Ngobeni
- Christo Niewoudt
- Malcolm Nofal
- Skhonza Nxasana

== P ==
- Khaif Patel
- Sahil Patel
- Liam Peters
- Heinrigh Pieterse
- Alex Pillay
- Theo Pistorius
- Maphekgola Pootona
- Jacques Pretorius

== Q ==
- Zakhele Qwabe

== R ==
- Don Radebe
- Thamsanqa Rapelego
- Andrew Rasemene
- Dilivio Ridgard
- Craig Rosendorff
- Gerrit Rudolph

== S ==
- Ruan Sadler
- Juandre Scheepers
- Tshepo Semenya
- Sello Sessing
- Nyiko Shikwambana
- Johannes Shokan]
- Xolane Shongwe
- Ben Skade
- Julian Soutter
- Louren Steenkamp
- Leighton Swarts

== T ==
- Lefa Thaba

== V ==
- Daniel van der Merwe
- Morné Venter

== W ==
- Michael Weldon
