= 2021–22 CSA 4-Day Series =

Cricket tournament

- Dates: 29 October 2021 – 7 March 2022
- Administrator: Cricket South Africa
- Cricket format: First-class
- Tournament format: Single round-robin
- Champions: Titans (6th title)
- Participants: 15
- Matches: 49
- Most runs: Div 1: Pieter Malan (601); Div 2: Jason Niemand (590)
- Most wickets: Div 1: Simon Harmer (44); Div 2: Thomas Kaber (35)

The 2021–22 CSA 4-Day Series was a first-class cricket competition that took place in South Africa from October 2021 to March 2022. It was the first edition of the post-franchise era, and the first edition to return to a two-division league format. Domestic cricketing reforms were introduced in 2020 that discontinued the six franchise team format, and announced a return to the more traditional provincial based system. Fifteen teams, split over the two divisions, now compete in the 4-Day Series.

In Division 1, five of the six teams who competed in the 2020–21 CSA 4-Day Franchise Series opted to retain their franchise brand, with only the former Cape Cobras reverting to their traditional Western Province name. They were joined in Division 1 by Boland and North West. Matches featuring either Limpopo or Mpumalanga, both in Division 2, do not have first-class status. Dolphins are the defending champions.

In November 2021, in the Division 2 match between South Western Districts and Easterns, Sean Whitehead took all ten wickets in the second innings for South Western Districts, recording the second-best figures in a domestic first-class match in South Africa. Following positive tests for COVID-19, all of the Division 2 matches scheduled to start on 2 December 2021 were postponed. The next round of matches, all scheduled to start on 16 December 2021, were also postponed due to COVID-19 concerns.

The tournament came down to the final day, with the Titans taking the lead from the Warriors after victory in their match against the Lions, and ultimately securing the title as the Warriors' final match was rained out.

== Points Table ==
Division One

Team	Pld	W	L	D	A	Pts
Titans (C)	7	4	1	2	0	129
Warriors	7	4	1	2	0	122
Lions	7	4	2	1	0	115
Dolphins	7	1	0	6	0	95
Boland	7	1	2	4	0	86
Western Province	7	1	2	4	0	82
Knights	7	1	2	4	0	78
North West	7	0	6	1	0	39

(C) Champion

Division Two

Team	Pld	W	L	D	A	Pts
Northern Cape	6	3	1	2	0	111
South Western Districts	6	3	1	2	0	103
KwaZulu-Natal Inland	6	2	2	2	0	92
Border	6	3	2	1	0	84
Mpumalanga	6	1	2	3	0	69
Limpopo	6	0	1	5	0	63
Easterns	6	1	4	1	0	58

== Fixtures ==
=== Division 1 ===
29 October – 1 November 2021
Scorecard

Dolphins	v	Western Province
489/8d (140.4 overs); Khaya Zondo 203* (299); Kyle Simmonds 4/146 (44 overs)		269 (89.4 overs); Wayne Parnell 79 (103); Bryce Parsons 5/82 (32.4 overs)
		190/7 (50 overs) (f/o); Yaseen Vallie 76 (109); Daryn Dupavillon 4/35 (13 overs)

Match drawn
Newlands, Cape Town
Umpires: Allahudien Paleker and Brad White

- Western Province won the toss and elected to field.
- Khaya Zondo (Dolphins) scored his maiden double century in first-class cricket.

29 October – 1 November 2021
Scorecard

Knights	v	Boland
320 (102.2 overs); Pite van Biljon 137 (192); Hardus Viljoen 4/62 (25 overs)		520/9d (146.5 overs); Janneman Malan 200* (319); Mbulelo Budaza 3/96 (25 overs)
143/2 (41 overs); Jacques Snyman 49 (68); Shaun von Berg 1/41 (15 overs)

Match drawn
Mangaung Oval, Bloemfontein
Umpires: Siphelele Gasa and Dennis Smith

- Boland won the toss and elected to field.
- No play was possible on day 1 due to rain.
- Hlomla Hanabe and Mickey Copeland (Boland) both made their first-class debuts.

29 October – 1 November 2021
Scorecard

North West	v	Lions
159 (40.2 overs); Wesley Marshall 52 (36); Duanne Olivier 4/51 (14.2 overs)		408 (128.1 overs); Ryan Rickelton 159 (230); Senuran Muthusamy 4/61 (24.1 overs)
177 (43.4 overs); Nicky van den Bergh 70 (88); Malusi Siboto 4/21 (10.4 overs)

Lions won by an innings and 72 runs
Wanderers Stadium, Johannesburg
Umpires: Lubabalo Gcuma and Barry Lambson

- Lions won the toss and elected to field.

29 October – 1 November 2021
Scorecard

Titans	v	Warriors
134 (38.2 overs); Jordan Hermann 50* (74); Glenton Stuurman 5/34 (13 overs)		258 (82.4 overs); Edward Moore 110 (188); Corbin Bosch 3/46 (15.4 overs)
359 (103.4 overs); Sibonelo Makhanya 74 (124); Mthiwekhaya Nabe 4/89 (22 overs)		236/9 (65.1 overs); Marco Jansen 55 (59); Junior Dala 3/59 (16.5 overs)

Warriors won by 1 wicket
Centurion Park, Centurion
Umpires: Abdoellah Steenkamp and Stephen Harris

- Warriors won the toss and elected to field.
- Jordan Hermann (Titans) made his first-class debut.

5–8 November 2021
Scorecard

Warriors	v	Lions
96 (49 overs); Lesiba Ngoepe 39 (104); Lutho Sipamla 6/34 (17 overs)		170 (24.4 overs); Joshua Richards 39 (90); Marco Jansen 6/38 (17.1 overs)
54 (34.1 overs); Sinethemba Qeshile 11 (63); Sisanda Magala 6/30 (13 overs)

Lions won by an innings and 20 runs
St George's Park Cricket Ground, Port Elizabeth
Umpires: Lubabalo Gcuma and Siphelele Gasa

- Warriors won the toss and elected to bat.

5–8 November 2021
Scorecard

Knights	v	North West
418/8 (96 overs); Patrick Kruger 192* (210); Senuran Muthusamy 3/115 (31 overs)		327 (68.2 overs); Nicky van den Bergh 42 (75); Mbulelo Budaza 4/64 (15 overs)
17/0 (2.1 overs); Jacques Snyman 15* (9)		197 (64 overs) (f/o); Wesley Marshall 33 (31); Gerald Coetzee 4/47 (16 overs)

Knights won by 10 wickets
Senwes Park, Potchefstroom
Umpires: Brad White and Dennis Smith

- North West won the toss and elected to field.
- Caleb Seleka (North West) made his first-class debut.

5–8 November 2021
Scorecard

Titans	v	Dolphins
424 (98.4 overs); Jordan Hermann 112 (132); Daryn Dupavillon 4/63 (16.4 overs)		433 (137.3 overs); Sarel Erwee 163 (370); Simon Harmer 4/106 (35)
126/1 (32 overs); Neil Brand 58* (112); Daryn Dupavillon 1/15 (9 overs)

Match drawn
Centurion Park, Centurion
Umpires: Allahudien Paleker and Arno Jacobs

- Titans won the toss and elected to bat.
- Achille Cloete (Dolphins) made his first-class debut.

5–8 November 2021
Scorecard

Boland	v	Western Province
267 (93.5 overs); Pieter Malan 96 (176); Mihlali Mpongwana 5/39 (17.5 overs)		444 (156.2 overs); Tony de Zorzi 129 (283); Shaun von Berg 5/119 (51.2 overs)
269/4 (119 overs); Pieter Malan 117* (349); Kyle Simmonds 3/81 (45 overs)

Match drawn
Boland Park, Paarl
Umpires: Shaun George and Stephen Harris

- Boland won the toss and elected to bat.

18–21 November 2021
Scorecard

Dolphins	v	Knights
226 (83.3 overs); Keegan Petersen 57 (58); Alfred Mothoa 3/35 (20 overs)		397/4d (108.3 overs); Matthew Kleinveldt 177* (357); Odirile Modimokoane 2/58 (18 overs)
174/5 (69.2 overs); Ruan de Swardt 51* (84); Gerald Coetzee 3/51 (16 overs)

Match drawn
Kingsmead Cricket Ground, Durban
Umpires: Mazizi Gampu and Murray Brown

- Dolphins won the toss and elected to bat.
- Odirile Modimokoane (Dolphins) made his first-class debut.

18–21 November 2021
Scorecard

Titans	v	Western Province
647/7d (172 overs); Grant Mokoena 154 (291); Kyle Simmonds 3/151 (47 overs)		195 (70.2 overs); Aviwe Mgijima 45 (76); Simon Harmer 7/76 (31.2 overs)
		313 (85.4 overs) (f/o); Daniel Smith 83 (157); Neil Brand 3/71 (19.4 overs)

Titans won by an innings and 139 runs
Newlands, Cape Town
Umpires: Abdoellah Steenkamp and Dennis Smith

- Western Province won the toss and elected to field.
- Daniel Smith, Gavin Kaplan and Kieran Kenny (Western Province) all made their first-class debuts.

18–21 November 2021
Scorecard

Warriors	v	North West
334 (114.1 overs); Lesiba Ngoepe 88 (135); Chad Classen 3/50 (18.1 overs)		350 (100.2 overs); Wesley Marshall 94 (99); Tsepo Ndwandwa 4/55 (28.2 overs)
364/2d (95 overs); Matthew Breetzke 152* (265); Lwandiswa Zuma 1/29 (9 overs)		218 (69.4 overs); Wesley Marshall 65 (73); Mthiwekhaya Nabe 3/28 (8 overs)

Warriors won by 130 runs
Senwes Park, Potchefstroom
Umpires: Philip Vosloo and Ryan Hendricks

- Warriors won the toss and elected to bat.

18–21 November 2021
Scorecard

Boland	v	Lions
170 (51.1 overs); Janneman Malan 54 (79); Duanne Olivier 4/38 (15.1 overs)		350 (93.1 overs); Ryan Rickelton 117 (140); Ferisco Adams 5/24 (12 overs)
150 (42.5 overs); Clyde Fortuin 18 (33); Duanne Olivier 5/57 (11.5 overs)

Lions won by an innings and 30 runs
Wanderers Stadium, Johannesburg
Umpires: Abongile Sodumo and Brad White

- Boland won the toss and elected to bat.
- Siyabonga Mahima (Boland) made his first-class debut.

25–28 November 2021
Scorecard

Dolphins	v	North West
400/9d (99.4 overs); Marques Ackerman 123 (156); Delano Potgieter 5/85 (23 overs)		313/2 (100 overs); Shaylen Pillay 156* (265); Kerwin Mungroo 1/46 (16 overs)

Match drawn
Senwes Park, Potchefstroom
Umpires: Abdoellah Steenkamp and Abongile Sodumo

- Dolphins won the toss and elected to bat.
- No play was possible on day 3 due to rain.
- Jesse Albanie, Tahir Isaacs (North West), Junaid Syed and Robin Smith (Dolphins) all made their first-class debuts.

25–28 November 2021
Scorecard

Knights	v	Lions
124 (37.5 overs); Jacques Snyman 46 (50); Duanne Olivier 5/53 (12.5 overs)		193/3d (69.4 overs); Joshua Richards 100* (208); Patrick Kruger 2/35 (11.4 overs)
103 (49.3 overs); Matthew Kleinveldt 19 (89); Malusi Siboto 4/17 (14 overs)		38 (4.5 overs); Dominic Hendricks 22* (19)

Lions won by 10 wickets
Wanderers Stadium, Johannesburg
Umpires: Philip Vosloo and Thomas Mokorosi

- Knights won the toss and elected to bat.

25–28 November 2021
Scorecard

Titans	v	Boland
308 (99.3 overs); Neil Brand 111 (230); Zakhele Qwabe 4/40 (16 overs)		234 (102.1 overs); Isma-eel Gafieldien 97 (305); Ayabulela Gqamane 3/41 (15 overs)
96/3 (34 overs); Neil Brand 32* (69); Shaun von Berg 2/25 (13 overs)

Match drawn
Boland Park, Paarl
Umpires: Murray Brown and Ryan Hendricks

- Titans won the toss and elected to bat.
- No play was possible on day 4 due to rain.

25–28 November 2021
Scorecard

Warriors	v	Western Province
366 (122.5 overs); Matthew Breetzke 100 (202); Kyle Simmonds 4/78 (22.5 overs)		79 (28.3 overs); Yaseen Vallie 18 (28); Tsepo Ndwandwa 3/7 (7.3 overs)
		173 (43.4 overs) (f/o); Basheeru-Deen Walters 52 (47); Wihan Lubbe 3/27 (8 overs)

Warriors won by an innings and 114 runs
St George's Park Cricket Ground, Port Elizabeth
Umpires: Mazizi Gampu and Siphelele Gasa

- Warriors won the toss and elected to bat.
- Liyema Waqu (Western Province) made his first-class debut.

13–16 January 2022
Scorecard

Lions	v	Dolphins
428/5d (132 overs); Joshua Richards 151 (251); Ottniel Baartman 2/57 (24 overs)		337 (116 overs); Grant Roelofsen 66 (110); Lutho Sipamla 3/55 (20 overs)
166/6d (58 overs); Dominic Hendricks 72 (164); Ottniel Baartman 4/48 (18 overs)		260/2 (47.4 overs); Marques Ackerman 139* (127); Malusi Siboto 1/32 (8 overs)

Match drawn
Kingsmead Cricket Ground, Durban
Umpires: Abdoellah Steenkamp and Arno Jacobs

- Lions won the toss and elected to bat.

13–16 January 2022
Scorecard

Warriors	v	Boland
245 (77 overs); Lesiba Ngoepe 75 (95); Shaun von Berg 6/76 (31 overs)		259 (65 overs); Stiaan van Zyl 93 (131); Tiaan van Vuuren 3/35 (12 overs)
356 (118.2 overs); Wihan Lubbe 102 (220); Stiaan van Zyl 3/18 (8 overs)		174 (46 overs); Pieter Malan 41 (36); Dane Paterson 7/25 (9 overs)

Warriors won by 168 runs
St George's Park Cricket Ground, Port Elizabeth
Umpires: Dennis Smith and Lubabalo Gcuma

- Boland won the toss and elected to field.

13–16 January 2022
Scorecard

Western Province	v	Knights
501/6d (121 overs); David Bedingham 199 (286); Gerald Coetzee 3/88 (24 overs)		190/5 (69 overs); Nathan Roux 63 (174); Kyle Simmonds 2/59 (21 overs)

Match drawn
Mangaung Oval, Bloemfontein
Umpires: Brad White and Siphelele Gasa

- Western Province won the toss and elected to bat.
- No play was possible on days 3 and 4 due to rain.
- Nathan Roux (Knights) made his first-class debut.

13–16 January 2022
Scorecard

North West	v	Titans
147 (45.2 overs); Shaylen Pillay 34 (81); Simon Harmer 5/20 (10.2 overs)		246 (72 overs); Heinrich Klaasen 128 (185); Delano Potgieter 4/40 (18 overs)
231 (76 overs); Heino Kuhn 119 (167); Lizaad Williams 3/16 (8 overs)		134/2 (30.3 overs); Grant Mokoena 50* (87); Delano Potgieter 2/30 (8 overs)

Titans won by 8 wickets
Senwes Park, Potchefstroom
Umpires: Shaun George and Stephen Harris

- North West won the toss and elected to bat.

27–30 January 2022
Scorecard

Warriors	v	Dolphins
386 (110.2 overs); Rudi Second 120 (191); Eathan Bosch 5/75 (25.2 overs)		451 (139 overs); Marques Ackerman 96 (130); Glenton Stuurman 5/97 (30 overs)
137/4 (62 overs); Sinethemba Qeshile 33* (94); Ottniel Baartman 2/18 (14 overs)

Match drawn
Kingsmead Cricket Ground, Durban
Umpires: Shaun George and Thomas Mokorosi

- Warriors won the toss and elected to bat.
- Rahman Waseem (Dolphins) made his first-class debut.

27–30 January 2022
Scorecard

Boland	v	North West
485/7d (162 overs); Stiaan van Zyl 127 (273); Ndumiso Mvelase 4/104 (25 overs)		170 (46.5 overs); Wesley Marshall 97 (148); Siyabonga Mahima 6/54 (18 overs)
		295 (104.5 overs) (f/o); Senuran Muthusamy 63 (194); Shaun von Berg 4/109 (28.5 overs)

Boland won by an innings and 20 runs
Boland Park, Paarl
Umpires: Dennis Smith and Philip Vosloo

- Boland won the toss and elected to bat.

27–30 January 2022
Scorecard

Western Province	v	Lions
315 (107.5 overs); Kyle Verreynne 86 (136); Malusi Siboto 4/31 (18.5 overs)		287 (103.3 overs); Ryan Rickelton 90 (160); Kyle Simmonds 6/109 (36.3 overs)
337/3d (95 overs); Jonathan Bird 152* (302); Duanne Olivier 1/46 (14 overs)		244/7 (91.4 overs); Ryan Rickelton 102* (233); Kyle Simmonds 4/93 (42.4 overs)

Match drawn
Newlands, Cape Town
Umpires: Abongile Sodumo and Brad White

- Lions won the toss and elected to field.
- Brad White stood in his 150th first-class match as an on-field umpire.

27–30 January 2022
Scorecard

Titans	v	Knights
515/9d (143.1 overs); Sibonelo Makhanya 111 (157); Alfred Mothoa 5/62 (21 overs)		197 (69 overs); Jason Raubenheimer 36* (77); Simon Harmer 4/70 (25 overs)
		165 (68.1 overs) (f/o); Patrick Kruger 53 (97); Simon Harmer 4/33 (22 overs)

Titans won by an innings and 153 runs
Mangaung Oval, Bloemfontein
Umpires: Abdoellah Steenkamp and Mazizi Gampu

- Titans won the toss and elected to bat.

4–7 March 2022
Scorecard

Western Province	v	North West
576 (163.1 overs); Daniel Smith 153 (236); Delano Potgieter 6/87 (33 overs)		202 (85.2 overs); Lesego Senokwane 66 (134); George Linde 5/69 (29.2 overs)
		242 (77.1 overs) (f/o); Senuran Muthusamy 101 (205); George Linde 3/48 (30 overs)

Western Province won by an innings and 132 runs
Newlands, Cape Town
Umpires: Allahudien Paleker and Arno Jacobs

- North West won the toss and elected to field.

4–7 March 2022
Scorecard

Knights	v	Warriors
227 (74.5 overs); Patrick Botha 123 (160); Tiaan van Vuuren 4/46 (19.5 overs)		166/3d (53.2 overs); Rudi Second 59* (129); Nhlakanipho Mpungose 1/27 (8 overs)
82/8 (30.2 overs); Patrick Botha 38 (48); Mthiwekhaya Nabe 4/26 (12 overs)

Match drawn
Mangaung Oval, Bloemfontein
Umpires: Lubabalo Gcuma and Stephen Harris

- Knights won the toss and elected to bat.
- No play was possible on day 3 due to rain.
- Nhlakanipho Mpungose (Knights) made his first-class debut.

4–7 March 2022
Scorecard

Lions	v	Titans
270 (98.3 overs); Mitchell Van Buuren 103* (182); Ayabulela Gqamane 3/45 (16 overs)		482 (146.5 overs); Theunis de Bruyn 143 (228); Codi Yusuf 5/91 (28.5 overs)
273 (86.2 overs); Mitchell Van Buuren 107 (184); Simon Harmer 6/84 (33.2 overs)		67/3 (13.1 overs); Grant Mokoena 29* (36); Codi Yusuf 2/34 (6 overs)

Titans won by 7 wickets
Centurion Park, Centurion
Umpires: Bongani Jele and Shaun George

- Lions won the toss and elected to bat.

4–7 March 2022
Scorecard

Dolphins	v	Boland
422 (159.5 overs); Keegan Petersen 123 (336); Achille Cloete 3/58 (22.5 overs)		422/8d ((160.1 overs); Pieter Malan 219* (438); Eathan Bosch 3/56 (26.1 overs)

Match drawn
Boland Park, Paarl
Umpires: Marais Erasmus and Murray Brown

- Dolphins won the toss and elected to bat.

=== Division 2 ===
29 October – 1 November 2021
Scorecard

KwaZulu-Natal Inland	v	Easterns
440/6d (110 overs); Luke Schlemmer 153 (228); Tumelo Tlhokwe 2/57 (11 overs)		107 (47 overs); Sizwe Masondo 22 (32); Keith Dudgeon 4/25 (13 overs)
		224 (110.1 overs) (f/o); Jurie Snyman 64 (131); Michael Erlank 5/67 (30 overs)

KwaZulu-Natal Inland won by an innings and 109 runs
City Oval, Pietermaritzburg
Umpires: Abongile Sodumo and Thomas Mokorosi

- Easterns won the toss and elected to field.
- No play was possible on day 2 due to rain.
- Khaya Nyamathe (Easterns) and Michael Sclanders (KwaZulu-Natal Inland) both made their first-class debuts.

29 October – 1 November 2021
Scorecard

Border	v	Limpopo
392 (144 overs); Marco Marais 146 (349); Thamsanqa Rapelego 4/55 (24 overs)		192 (76.2 overs); Malcolm Nofal 58 (136); Thomas Kaber 6/75 (32 overs)
190/3d (43.1 overs); Jason Niemand 77 (95); Ntokozo Mahlaba 3/79 (18.1 overs)		377/8 (125.5 overs); Malcolm Nofal 96* (201); Gideon Peters 3/51 (22 overs)

Match drawn
Cricket Club Ground, Polokwane
Umpires: Mazizi Gampu and Philip Vosloo

- Limpopo won the toss and elected to field.

5–8 November 2021
Scorecard

Northern Cape	v	KwaZulu-Natal Inland
333 (108.3 overs); Jonathan Vandiar 85 (176); Mondli Khumalo 4/51 (19.1 overs)		322 (87.1 overs); Luke Schlemmer 63 (105); Johan van Dyk 4/69 (15.1 overs)
256/6 (80 overs); Ernest Kemm 121* (235); Keith Dudgeon 3/76 (18 overs)		182 (48 overs); Luke Schlemmer 42 (65); Aubrey Swanepoel 6/42 (16 overs)

Northern Cape won by 130 runs
Diamond Oval, Kimberley
Umpires: Godwin Von Willingh and Jurie Sadler

- Northern Cape won the toss and elected to bat.

5–8 November 2021
Scorecard

Mpumalanga	v	South Western Districts
311 (80.2 overs); Alexander Kok 90 (125); Andre Malan 2/32 (11 overs)		209 (60.2 overs); Yaseen Valli 86* (189); Jon Hinrichsen 4/71 (21.2 overs)
104 (38.1 overs); Glen Adams 21 (26); Hershell America 2/16 (6 overs)		166/2 (26 overs); Blayde Capell 72 (64); Bamanye Xenxe 1/60 (7 overs)

Match drawn
Recreation Ground, Oudtshoorn
Umpires: Gladman Gaseba and Jan Erasmus

- South Western Districts won the toss and elected to field.

5–8 November 2021
Scorecard

Easterns	v	Limpopo
441 (120.2 overs); Musawenkosi Twala 124 (245); Sithembile Langa 3/64 (24 overs)		261 (103.2 overs); Thomas Hobson 102 (220); Khwezi Gumede 3/44 (19 overs)
		207/3 (64 overs) (f/o); Ludwig Kaestner 74* (184); Devon Botha 1/14 (3 overs)

Match drawn
Willowmoore Park, Benoni
Umpires: Lauren Agenbag and Marlon Jansen

- Limpopo won the toss and elected to field.

12–15 November 2021
Scorecard

Border	v	Mpumalanga
154 (49.5 overs); Marco Marais 45 (73); Bamanye Xenxe 6/51 (15 overs)		122 (37 overs); Caleb Balich 33 (35); Thomas Kaber 4/31 (7 overs)
637/9d (140.4 overs); Jason Niemand 321* (401); Kgaudisa Molefe 2/68 (15 overs)		185 (51.4 overs); Yassar Cook 57 (56); Thomas Kaber 5/73 (21.4 overs)

Border won by 484 runs
Buffalo Park, East London
Umpires: Bongani Ntshebe and Murray Brown

- Mpumalanga won the toss and elected to field.

18–21 November 2021
Scorecard

South Western Districts	v	Easterns
242 (83.4 overs); Leus du Plooy 91 (232); Divan Posthumus 3/10 (8.4 overs)		250 (85.5 overs); Sizwe Masondo 63 (91); Sean Whitehead 5/64 (20.5 overs)
193 (63.4 overs); Leus du Plooy 85* (162); Clayton August 3/21 (12 overs)		65 (25.1 overs); Divan Posthumus 20 (22); Sean Whitehead 10/36 (12.1 overs)

South Western Districts won by 120 runs
Recreation Ground, Oudtshoorn
Umpires: Jurie Sadler and Roger Burne

- South Western Districts won the toss and elected to bat.
- Divan Posthumus (Easterns) made his first-class debut.

18–21 November 2021
Scorecard

Border	v	KwaZulu-Natal Inland
384 (130.2 overs); Thomas Kaber 103* (171); Michael Erlank 4/64 (38 overs)		384 (116.1 overs); Tshepang Dithole 162 (343); Thomas Kaber 5/109 (35.1 overs)
106 (51.5 overs); Jason Niemand 51 (112); Luke Schlemmer 6/31 (17.5 overs)		108/3 (21.4 overs); Luke Schlemmer 36* (42); Sean Jamison 1/25 (4 overs)

KwaZulu-Natal Inland won by 7 wickets
Buffalo Park, East London
Umpires: A Olivier and Marlon Jansen

- KwaZulu-Natal Inland won the toss and elected to field.

18–21 November 2021
Scorecard

Limpopo	v	Northern Cape
295 (114.3 overs); Bruce Shiburi 80 (180); Aubrey Swanepoel 7/56 (37 overs)		350 (109.4 overs); Rivaldo Moonsamy 101 (109); Malcolm Nofal 4/119 (38.4 overs)
185 (61 overs); Malcolm Nofal 61 (129); Aubrey Swanepoel 4/65 (25 overs)		121/7 (32 overs); Aubrey Swanepoel 44* (50); Sithembile Langa 4/32 (14 overs)

Match drawn
Cricket Club Ground, Polokwane
Umpires: Duma Ntuli and Jan Erasmus

- Limpopo won the toss and elected to bat.

13–16 January 2022
Scorecard

South Western Districts	v	KwaZulu-Natal Inland
315 (96 overs); Blayde Capell 80 (68); Keith Dudgeon 3/41 (21 overs)		332 (79.3 overs); Cameron Delport 119 (135); Sean Whitehead 4/70 (24 overs)
135/1 (39 overs); Andre Malan 59* (116); Michael Erlank 1/37 (12 overs)

Match drawn
City Oval, Pietermaritzburg
Umpires: Abongile Sodumo and Thomas Mokorosi

- South Western Districts won the toss and elected to bat.

13–16 January 2022
Scorecard

Northern Cape	v	Easterns
434/5d (99 overs); Aubrey Swanepoel 134 (129); Khwezi Gumede 2/82 (16 overs)		321 (93.2 overs); Grant Thomson 77 (105); Benjamin Van Rensburg 3/43 (13 overs)
332/6d (68.4 overs); Evan Jones 128 (132); Matthew Arnold 2/55 (11 overs)		192 (58.5 overs); Gionne Koopman 33 (47); Johan van Dyk 3/58 (16 overs)

Northern Cape won by 253 runs
Willowmoore Park, Benoni
Umpires: Roderick Ellis and Ryan Hendricks

- Northern Cape won the toss and elected to bat.
- Benjamin Van Rensburg, Hanu Viljoen (Northern Cape) and Nhlakanipho Nxumalo (Easterns) all made their first-class debuts.

13–16 January 2022
Scorecard

Mpumalanga	v	Limpopo
216 (73.4 overs); Benjamin van Niekerk 113* (142); Don Radebe 5/41 (14.4 overs)		82/2 (21 overs); Thomas Hobson 37* (54); Bamanye Xenxe 1/30 (6 overs)

Match drawn
White River Country Club, White River
Umpires: Mazizi Gampu and Philip Vosloo

- No play was possible on days 2, 3 and 4 due to rain.

27–30 January 2022
Scorecard

Border	v	Northern Cape
86 (33.2 overs); Thomas Kaber 27 (37); Beyers Swanepoel 4/6 (9.2 overs)		525/5d (130 overs); Aubrey Swanepoel 111* (119); Phaphama Fojela 4/57 (24 overs)
168 (60.3 overs); Nonelela Yikha 62 (136); Beyers Swanepoel 4/22 (20 overs)

Northern Cape won by an innings and 271 runs
Buffalo Park, East London
Umpires: Jurie Sadler and Warren Wyngaard

- Border won the toss and elected to bat.

27–30 January 2022
Scorecard

Limpopo	v	South Western Districts
227 (82.5 overs); Malcolm Nofal 60 (95); Andre Malan 3/41 (16 overs)		245 (80 overs); Yaseen Valli 67 (156); Malcolm Nofal 5/60 (20 overs)
69 (36.1 overs); Mtabozuko Nqam 30* (66); Marcello Piedt 5/21 (14 overs)		52/2 (8 overs); Blayde Capell 14 (11); Sithembile Langa 1/19 (4 overs)

South Western Districts won by 8 wickets
Cricket Club Ground, Polokwane
Umpires: Godwin Von Willingh and Roderick Ellis

- South Western Districts won the toss and elected to field.

27–30 January 2022
Scorecard

Mpumalanga	v	Easterns
224 (65.4 overs); Tumi Koto 48 (99); Divan Posthumus 5/59 (16 overs)		393 (107.2 overs); Grant Thomson 145 (195); Bamanye Xenxe 5/111 (26 overs)
198 (54.1 overs); Benjamin van Niekerk 43 (69); Grant Thomson 3/29 (13 overs)		30/0 (5.5 overs); Musawenkosi Twala 17* (20)

Easterns won by 10 wickets
White River Country Club, White River
Umpires: Jan Erasmus and Marlon Jansen

- Mpumalanga won the toss and elected to bat.

10–13 February 2022
Scorecard

Northern Cape	v	South Western Districts
351 (82.2 overs); Evan Jones 157* (128); Renaldo Meyer 5/55 (16.2 overs)		555 (143.2 overs); Leus du Plooy 186 (227); Johan van Dyk 3/102 (28 overs)
303 (97.2 overs); Jonathan Vandiar 74 (148); Marcello Piedt 3/50 (17 overs)		100/2 (20.3 overs); Andre Malan 64* (69); Beyers Swanepoel 1/28 (6 overs)

South Western Districts won by 8 wickets
Diamond Oval, Kimberley
Umpires: Marlon Jansen and Thomas Mokorosi

- Northern Cape won the toss and elected to field.

17–20 February 2022
Scorecard

Easterns	v	Border
176 (59.4 overs); Wesley Coulentianos 76 (157); Sinovuyo Ntuntwana 4/30 (12 overs)		161 (58 overs); Marco Marais 32 (34); Amaan Khan 4/25 (13 overs)
211 (75.1 overs); Grant Thomson 63 (86); Joshua Dodd 3/20 (10 overs)		229/8 (75.3 overs); Jerry Nqolo 46 (118); Khwezi Gumede 2/26 (17 overs)

Border won by 2 wickets
Willowmoore Park, Benoni
Umpires: Abdoellah Steenkamp and Mazizi Gampu

- Easterns won the toss and elected to bat.
- Amaan Khan and Devon Botha (Easterns) both made their first-class debuts.

17–20 February 2022
Scorecard

Mpumalanga	v	KwaZulu-Natal Inland
384 (90.2 overs); Yassar Cook 169 (194); Matthew Pollard 5/78 (17.2 overs)		247 (81.5 overs); Tshepang Dithole 77 (123); Alexander Kok 5/66 (28.5 overs)
196 (54 overs); Caleb Balich 31 (34); Luke Schlemmer 4/42 (10 overs)		171 (43 overs); Andile Mokgakane 49 (45); Alexander Kok 7/81 (22 overs)

Mpumalanga won by 162 runs
White River Country Club, White River
Umpires: Philip Vosloo and Siphelele Gasa

- KwaZulu-Natal Inland won the toss and elected to field.

3–6 March 2022
Scorecard

South Western Districts	v	Border
238 (84.4 overs); Jean du Plessis 144 (250); Joshua Dodd 3/32 (14.4 overs)		314 (159 overs); Thomas Kaber 138* (260); Sean Whitehead 3/56 (23 overs)
188 (55.5 overs); Blayde Capell 76 (134); Thomas Kaber 7/67 (16.5 overs)		113/1 (29 overs); Jerome Bossr 57* (101); Andre Malan 1/13 (2 overs)

Border won by 9 wickets
Recreation Ground, Oudtshoorn
Umpires: Abdoellah Steenkamp and Jan Erasmus

3–6 March 2022
Scorecard

Limpopo	v	KwaZulu-Natal Inland
330 (104.2 overs); Ludwig Kaestner 139 (259); Keith Dudgeon 5/64 (25 overs)		215 (77.4 overs); Tshepang Dithole 70 (111); Sithembile Langa 3/41 (19 overs)
212 (85.2 overs); Ludwig Kaestner 80 (132); Michael Erlank 5/57 (31 overs)		255/9 (80 overs); Michael Erlank 61 (111); Malcolm Nofal 5/75 (26 overs)

Match drawn
City Oval, Pietermaritzburg
Umpires: Dennis Smith and Godwin Von Willingh

- Limpopo won the toss and elected to bat.

3–6 March 2022
Scorecard

Mpumalanga	v	Northern Cape
267 (68 overs); Liam Peters 72 (114); Aubrey Swanepoel 3/54 (18 overs)		489/9d (123 overs); Isaac Dikgale 232 (359); Akhulile Mkatu 4/118 (24 overs)
312/4 (82 overs); Liam Peters 72 (87); Ernest Kemm 2/45 (17 overs)

Match drawn
Diamond Oval, Kimberley
Umpires: Jurie Sadler and Ryan Hendricks

- Mpumalanga won the toss and elected to bat.
