= 2020–21 CSA 3-Day Provincial Cup =

Cricket tournament

- Dates: 22 February – 28 March 2021
- Administrator: Cricket South Africa
- Cricket format: First-class (Note: Matches involving either Limpopo, Mpumalanga or the South Africa under-19 cricket team did not have first-class status.)
- Tournament format: Round-robin
- Participants: 16
- Matches: 16

The 2020–21 CSA 3-Day Provincial Cup was a first-class cricket competition that took place in South Africa during February and March 2021. Easterns and KwaZulu-Natal were the defending champions, after the title was shared due to the COVID-19 pandemic.

The first matches were scheduled to start on 7 January 2021, however the start of the season was delayed until February due to the pandemic. Initially the tournament was to be played between the fifteen South African provincial teams, split into two groups. However, after the tournament restarted in February 2021, Cricket South Africa (CSA) confirmed that the South Africa under-19 cricket team would also be included in the competition. CSA issued a revised schedule for the tournament, with all the matches being held in a bio-secure environment. Matches involving either Limpopo, Mpumalanga or the South Africa under-19 team did not have first-class status.

In March 2021, Border were dismissed for just sixteen runs in their second innings, equalling the lowest team total in first-class cricket in South Africa. In the South Africa under-19's first match, the team were bowled out for 41 runs in their first innings, before going on to lose the match by an innings and 83 runs.

== Teams ==
The teams were placed into the following groups:

- Pool A: Boland, Border, KwaZulu-Natal, South Western Districts
- Pool B: Easterns, Free State, KwaZulu-Natal Inland, Limpopo
- Pool C: Northerns, Northern Cape, South Africa Under-19s, Western Province
- Pool D: Eastern Province, Gauteng, Mpumalanga, North West

== Fixtures ==
=== Pool A ===
22–24 February 2021
Scorecard

Boland	v	Border
334 (108 overs); Justin Dill 131* (185); Phaphama Fojela 3/59 (25 overs)		308 (93.1 overs); Phaphama Fojela 64 (91); Zakhele Qwabe 4/62 (20 overs)
197 (61.3 overs); Fritz de Beer 96 (166); Phaphama Fojela 4/49 (15 overs)		170/6 (44 overs); Wesley Coulentianos 59 (74); Sinalo Gobeni 4/40 (14 overs)

Match drawn
Boland Park, Paarl
Umpires: Godwin Von Willingh and Murray Brown

- Boland won the toss and elected to bat.
- Marshin Jefta (Boland) made his first-class debut.

22–24 February 2021
Scorecard

South Western Districts	v	KwaZulu-Natal
182 (60.5 overs); Hanno Kotze 49 (73); Michael Erlank 3/14 (10 overs)		152 (64 overs); Bradley Porteous 55 (111); Niel Hornbuckle 4/7 (5 overs)
298 (90.3 overs); Jean du Plessis 74 (140); Zakariya Paruk 3/47 (15.3 overs)		331/7 (89.3 overs); Marques Ackerman 122 (164); Kelly Smuts 2/61 (16.3 overs)

KwaZulu-Natal won by 3 wickets
Stellenbosch University 1, Stellenbosch
Umpires: Abdoellah Steenkamp and Gladman Gaseba

- South Western Districts won the toss and elected to bat.
- Sintu Majeza (South Western Districts) made his first-class debut.

4–6 March 2021
Scorecard

KwaZulu-Natal	v	Border
361 (108.3 overs); Jason Oakes 121 (235); Phaphama Fojela 6/45 (22.3 overs)		166 (58.2 overs); Phaphama Fojela 41 (30); Smangaliso Nhlebela 5/58 (17.2 overs)
		16 (11.4 overs) (f/o); Nonelela Yikha 7 (23); Keith Dudgeon 5/8 (6 overs)

KwaZulu-Natal won by an innings and 179 runs
Boland Park, Paarl
Umpires: Abdoellah Steenkamp and Godwin Von Willingh

- Border won the toss and elected to field.
- Daelen Fynn (KwaZulu-Natal) made his first-class debut.

4–6 March 2021
Scorecard

Boland	v	South Western Districts
128 (69.4 overs); Ruan Terblanche 31 (103); Tsepo Ndwandwa 4/45 (20.5 overs)		317 (67.4 overs); Jean du Plessis 76 (96); Reeve Cyster 4/39 (9.4 overs)
87 (38.3 overs); Fritz de Beer 27 (63); Tsepo Ndwandwa 7/38 (19.3 overs)

South Western Districts won by an innings and 102 runs
Stellenbosch University 1, Stellenbosch
Umpires: Abongile Sodumo and Gladman Gaseba

- Boland won the toss and elected to bat.
- Travis Ackerman (South Western Districts) made his first-class debut.

=== Pool B ===
22–24 February 2021
Scorecard

KwaZulu-Natal Inland	v	Limpopo
166 (62.1 overs); Ruan Cronje 58 (114); Michael Mahlaba 4/44 (18.1 overs)		48/3 (15.3 overs); Thomas Hobson 19* (37); Lifa Ntanzi 3/12 (5 overs)

Match drawn
Central University of Technology, ABSA Oval, Bloemfontein
Umpires: Jurie Sadler

- KwaZulu-Natal Inland won the toss and elected to bat.

22–24 February 2021
Scorecard

Easterns	v	Free State
378/9d (108 overs); Matthew Arnold 104* (186); Sean Whitehead 4/51 (18 overs)		102 (29.5 overs); Obus Pienaar 34 (52); Matthew Arnold 5/32 (10 overs)
		230 (82.4 overs) (f/o); Obus Pienaar 62 (111); Kgaudisa Molefe 5/46 (25 overs)

Easterns won by an innings and 46 runs
Mangaung Oval, Bloemfontein
Umpires: Dennis Smith and Marlon Jansen

- Easterns won the toss and elected to bat.
- Danie Rossouw, Donavon Ferreira and Jean-Pierre Bloem (Easterns) all made their first-class debuts.

4–6 March 2021
Scorecard

Easterns	v	KwaZulu-Natal Inland
269 (81.3 overs); Donavon Ferreira 125 (138); Thula Ngcobo 5/40 (20.3 overs)		433/9d (136.4 overs); Luke Schlemmer 193 (369); Clayton August 3/65 (22 overs)
142 (65.1 overs); Donavon Ferreira 75 (90); Kurtlyn Mannikam 4/56 (26 overs)

KwaZulu-Natal Inland won by an innings and 22 runs
SuperSport Park, Centurion
Umpires: Jurie Sadler and Phillip Vosloo

- KwaZulu-Natal Inland won the toss and elected to field.
- Mondli Khumalo and Waseem Rahman (KwaZulu-Natal Inland) both made their first-class debuts.

4–6 March 2021
Scorecard

Free State	v	Limpopo
219 (65.3 overs); Dilivio Ridgaard 83 (149); Michael Mahlaba 9/73 (22.3 overs)		70 (26.1 overs); Ludwig Kaestner 18 (37); Sean Whitehead 5/8 (9 overs)
126 (38.4 overs); Marco de Kock 26 (58); Michael Mahlaba 8/68 (19.4 overs)		119 (25 overs); Nyiko Shikwambana 43 (33); Lerato Nqoyi 3/8 (2 overs)

Free State won by 156 runs
Central University of Technology, ABSA Oval, Bloemfontein
Umpires: Lauren Agenbag and Marlon Jansen

- Free State won the toss and elected to bat.

=== Pool C ===
16–18 March 2021
Scorecard

Northern Cape	v	Western Province
212/4 (79.2 overs); Jack Newby 102 (224); Aubrey Swanepoel 2/43 (13.2 overs)

Match drawn
Diamond Oval, Kimberley
Umpires: Marlon Jansen and Philip Vosloo

- Northern Cape won the toss and elected to field.
- Jerome Xaba, Orapeleng Motlhoaring (Northern Cape) and Lehan Botha (Western Province) all made their first-class debuts.

16–18 March 2021
Scorecard

South Africa Under-19s	v	Northerns
41 (27.5 overs); Dewald Brevis 12 (40); Kyle Simmonds 5/4 (8 overs)		274/7d (63 overs); Gionne Koopman 82 (134); Nathan Steyn 3/45 (12 overs)
150 (80.1 overs); Nathan Steyn 34 (76); Kyle Simmonds 4/51 (25.1 overs)

Northerns won by an innings and 83 runs
Country Club B Field, Kimberley
Umpires: Lauren Agenbag and R Richards

- Northerns won the toss and elected to field.

26–28 March 2021
Scorecard

Western Province	v	Northerns
110 (38.3 overs); Brendon Louw 23 (28); Gionne Koopman 6/23 (13 overs)		253/8d (65.4 overs); Merrick Brett 69 (67); Ryan Klein 5/60 (19 overs)
127/1 (30 overs); Zac Elkin 78* (75); Gionne Koopman 1/23 (6 overs)

Match drawn
Diamond Oval, Kimberley
Umpires: Siphelele Gasa and Marlon Jansen

- Northerns won the toss and elected to field.
- Merrick Brett, Jandré Pretorius and Kiel van Vollenhoven (Northerns) all made their first-class debuts.

26–28 March 2021
Scorecard

South Africa Under-19s	v	Northern Cape
330 (99 overs); Jan Coetzer 75 (88); Benjamin Van Rensburg 2/37 (4 overs)		261 (94.5 overs); Blake Schraader 97 (169); Andile Simelane 2/21 (14 overs)
144/3d (31 overs); Jade Smith 76 (76); Desmond de Koker 2/16 (7 overs)		77/3 (28 overs); Ernest Kemm 36* (98); Joshua Stephenson 1/8 (5 overs)

Match drawn
Country Club B Field, Kimberley
Umpires: Jurie Sadler and Phillip Vosloo

- South Africa Under-19s won the toss and elected to bat.

=== Pool D ===
16–18 March 2021
Scorecard

Gauteng	v	Eastern Province
367/6d (94 overs); Shaylen Pillay 123 (202); Sithembile Langa 2/55 (14 overs)		250/6 (76 overs); Tristan Stubbs 132 (161); Aristides Karvelas 3/33 (16 overs)

Match drawn
North-West University No1 Ground, Potchefstroom
Umpires: Gladman Gaseba and Murray Brown

- Gauteng won the toss and elected to bat.
- Ethan Frosler (Eastern Province) made his first-class debut.

16–18 March 2021
Scorecard

Mpumalanga	v	North West
135 (54.2 overs); Alexander Kok 92 (139); Jordan Morris 5/26 (12 overs)		126 (53.5 overs); Christopher Britz 23 (46); Bamanye Xenxe 3/29 (16.2 overs)
229/5d (51 overs); Benjamin van Niekerk 46 (41); Jon Hinrichsen 3/47 (15 overs)		23/1 (13 overs); Eben Botha 15* (43); Bamanye Xenxe 1/1 (3 overs)

Match drawn
Senwes Park, Potchefstroom
Umpires: Jan Erasmus and Mazizi Gampu

- North West won the toss and elected to field.

26–28 March 2021
Scorecard

North West	v	Gauteng
308 (94 overs); Lesego Senokwane 158 (290); Aristides Karvelas 2/34 (15 overs)		329 (117 overs); Shaylen Pillay 126 (307); Chad Classen 5/54 (30 overs)
93/2d (37 overs); Ruan Haasbroek 53* (107); Sean Jamison 2/10 (9 overs)

Match drawn
North-West University No1 Ground, Potchefstroom
Umpires: Murray Brown and Abongile Sodumo

- North West won the toss and elected to bat.
- Christopher Britz and AJ Jacobs (North West) both made their first-class debuts.

26–28 March 2021
Scorecard

Mpumalanga	v	Eastern Province
179 (57.3 overs); Matthew Smit 43 (129); Thomas Kaber 5/38 (14.3 overs)		196 (53.1 overs); Joshua van Heerden 58 (85); Thomas Mashiane 3/24 (11.1 overs)
190 (56 overs); Matthew Smit 91* (169); Ethan Frosler 4/27 (10 overs)		177/8 (50.5 overs); Luke Beaufort 54 (107); Maarten Steenkamp 5/49 (12.5 overs)

Eastern Province won by 2 wickets
Senwes Park, Potchefstroom
Umpires: Jan Erasmus and Godwin Von Willingh

- Eastern Province won the toss and elected to field.
