= Mashigo =

Mashigo is a surname. Notable people with the surname include:

- Boipelo Mashigo (born 2003), South African soccer player
- Katlego Mashigo (born 2001), South African soccer player
- Koko Mokgalong-Mashigo, South African politician and civil servant
- Mohale Mashigo (born 1983), South African singer-songwriter and novelist
- Nhlanhla Mashigo (born 2002), South African cricketer
- Refilwe Mashigo (born 1947), South African politician
