= Thomas Hobson =

Thomas Hobson may refer to

- Thomas Hobson (carrier) (c. 1544–1631), English postal carrier
- Thomas Hobson (actor) (born 1982), American actor
- Thomas Hobson (cricketer) (born 1994), South African cricketer
