= Mesuli =

Mesuli is a South African given name. Notable people with the name include:

- Mesuli Kama, South African politician
- Mesuli Vuba (born 1997), South African cricketer
