= Andrew Louw =

Andrew Louw may refer to:

- Andrew Louw (cricketer) (born 2000), South African cricketer
- Andrew Louw (umpire) (born 1987), Namibian cricket umpire
- Andrew Louw (politician) (born 1969), South African politician
