= Justin Watson =

Justin Watson may refer to:

- Justin Watson (cricketer) (born 1998), South African cricketer
- Justin Watson (running back) (born 1975), American former National Football League player
- Justin Watson (wide receiver) (born 1996), American National Football League player
