= Rory Kleinveldt =

South African cricketer (born 1983)

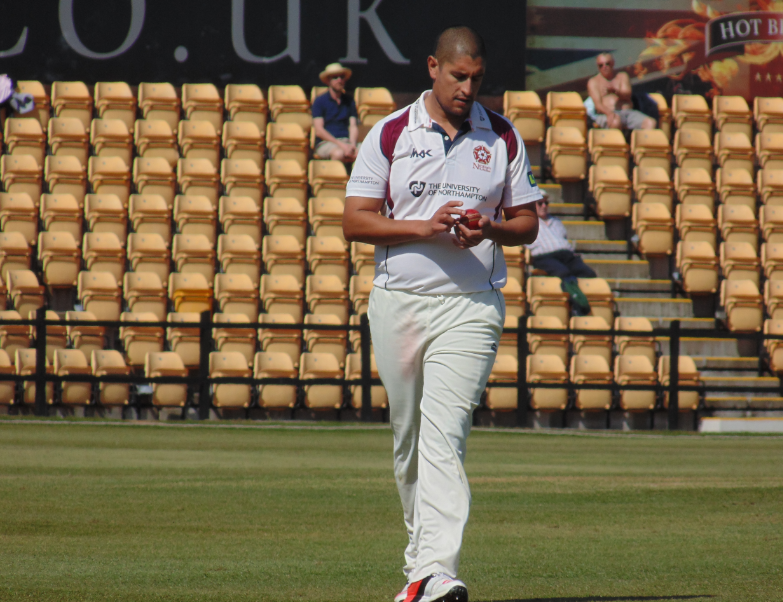

Personal information
- Full name: Rory Keith Kleinveldt
- Born: 15 March 1983 (age 43); Cape Town, Cape Province, South Africa
- Batting: Right-handed
- Bowling: Right-arm fast-medium
- Role: Bowler
- Relatives: Matthew Kleinveldt (cousin); Johnny Kleinveldt (uncle)

International information
- National side: South Africa (2008–2013)
- Test debut (cap 313): 9 November 2012 v Australia
- Last Test: 22 February 2013 v Pakistan
- ODI debut (cap 106): 19 January 2013 v New Zealand
- Last ODI: 28 July 2013 v Sri Lanka
- T20I debut (cap 34): 5 November 2008 v Bangladesh
- Last T20I: 3 March 2013 v Pakistan

Domestic team information
- Years: Team
- 2002/03–2019/20: Western Province
- 2005/06–2019/20: Cape Cobras
- 2008: Hampshire
- 2015–2018: Northamptonshire (squad no. 6)
- 2018: Tshwane Spartans

Career statistics
Competition	Test	ODI	FC	LA
Matches	4	10	148	181
Runs scored	27	105	3,743	1,947
Batting average	9.00	15.00	20.23	20.28
100s/50s	0/0	0/0	1/17	1/3
Top score	17*	43	115*	128
Balls bowled	667	513	25,106	8,352
Wickets	10	12	454	210
Bowling average	42.20	37.33	27.92	31.70
5 wickets in innings	0	0	20	0
10 wickets in match	0	0	2	0
Best bowling	3/65	4/22	9/65	4/22
Catches/stumpings	2/–	4/–	71/–	31/–
- Source: ESPNcricinfo, 2 April 2020

Rory Keith Kleinveldt (born 15 March 1983) is a South African former cricketer. He made his international debut in a Twenty20 International against Bangladesh in Johannesburg on 5 November 2008. In January 2019, Kleinveldt announced his retirement from first-class cricket.

== Career ==
During the 2008 County Championship Kleinveldt played for Hampshire. Between 2015 and 2018 he played for Northamptonshire.

Kleinveldt was a star on the rise after he was named in the ODI squad to play Sri Lanka in January 2012, but he did not get a game before he was withdrawn with an injury. Two months later, he tested positive for marijuana and was immediately dropped from the Cobras' T20 campaign. Kleinveldt confessed at the first opportunity and conceded that he had "behaved irresponsibly and made a big mistake."

Kleinveldt made his test debut on the 9 November 2012 against Australia in a drawn match.

He along with David Miller set the record for the highest 9th wicket partnership in ICC Champions Trophy history(95)

In August 2017, he was named in Cape Town Knight Riders' squad for the first season of the T20 Global League. However, in October 2017, Cricket South Africa initially postponed the tournament until November 2018, with it being cancelled soon after.

In June 2018, he was named in the squad for the Cape Cobras team for the 2018–19 season. In October 2018, he was named in Tshwane Spartans' squad for the first edition of the Mzansi Super League T20 tournament.

Having been Northamptonshire's lead bowling coach since March 2024, he was appointed Western Province head coach in June 2025.
