= Odirile Modimokoane =

South African cricketer (born 2001)

Personal information
- Born: 10 July 2001 (age 25)

Domestic team information
- Years: Team
- 2021/22: Dolphins
- Source: Cricinfo, 10 October 2021

Odirile Modimokoane (born 10 July 2001) is a South African cricketer. He made his Twenty20 debut on 10 October 2021, for Dolphins in the 2021–22 CSA Provincial T20 Knock-Out tournament. Prior to his Twenty20 debut, he was named in South Africa's squad for the 2020 Under-19 Cricket World Cup. He made his first-class debut on 18 November 2021, for Dolphins in the 2021–22 CSA 4-Day Series. He made his List A debut on 27 March 2022, for Dolphins in the 2021–22 CSA One-Day Cup.
