= Kiel van Vollenhoven =

South African cricketer (born 1998)

Personal information
- Full name: Kiel Thomas van Vollenhoven
- Born: 6 June 1998 (age 28)
- Batting: Right-handed
- Bowling: Right-arm leg break

Domestic team information
- Years: Team
- 2020/21: Northerns
- 2021: Warwickshire
- Only First-class: 26 March 2021 Northerns v Western Province
- List A debut: 22 July 2021 Warwickshire v Glamorgan

Career statistics
Competition	First-class	List A
Matches	1	2
Runs scored	23	21
Batting average	23.00	10.50
100s/50s	0/0	0/0
Top score	23	20
Balls bowled	84	42
Wickets	1	0
Bowling average	37.00	–
5 wickets in innings	0	–
10 wickets in match	0	–
Best bowling	1/18	–
Catches/stumpings	0/–	1/–
- Source: Cricinfo, 28 August 2021

Kiel Thomas van Vollenhoven (born 6 June 1998) is a South African cricketer. He made his first-class debut on 26 March 2021, for Northerns in the 2020–21 CSA 3-Day Provincial Cup in South Africa. He made his List A debut on 22 July 2021, for Warwickshire in the 2021 Royal London One-Day Cup in England.
