= Siphamandla Mavanda =

South African cricketer (born 1997)

Personal information
- Born: 27 June 1997 (age 29)
- Source: Cricinfo, 28 October 2018

Siphamandla Mavanda (born 27 June 1997) is a South African cricketer. He made his List A debut for Free State in the 2018–19 CSA Provincial One-Day Challenge on 28 October 2018. He made his first-class debut for Free State in the 2018–19 CSA 3-Day Provincial Cup on 1 November 2018. In September 2019, he was named in Free State's squad for the 2019–20 CSA Provincial T20 Cup. He made his Twenty20 debut for Free State in the 2019–20 CSA Provincial T20 Cup on 13 September 2019.
