= Sintu Majeza =

South African cricketer (born 1999)

Personal information
- Born: 4 November 1999 (age 27)
- Source: Cricinfo, 25 February 2021

Sintu Majeza (born 4 November 1999) is a South African cricketer. He made his first-class debut on 22 February 2021, for South Western Districts in the 2020–21 CSA 3-Day Provincial Cup. He made his List A debut on 28 February 2021, for South Western Districts in the 2020–21 CSA Provincial One-Day Challenge. In April 2021, he was named in South Western Districts' squad, ahead of the 2021–22 cricket season in South Africa. He made his Twenty20 debut on 24 September 2021, for South Western Districts in the 2021–22 CSA Provincial T20 Knock-Out tournament.
