= Travis Ackerman =

South African cricketer (born 1999)

Personal information
- Born: 8 May 1999 (age 27)
- Source: Cricinfo, 10 February 2019

Travis Ackerman (born 8 May 1999) is a South African cricketer. He made his List A debut for South Western Districts in the 2018–19 CSA Provincial One-Day Challenge on 10 February 2019. He made his Twenty20 debut for South Western Districts in the 2019–20 CSA Provincial T20 Cup on 13 September 2019. He made his first-class debut on 4 March 2021, for South Western Districts in the 2020–21 CSA 3-Day Provincial Cup.
