= Siyabonga Mahima =

South African cricketer (born 1996)

Personal information
- Born: 9 May 1996 (age 30)
- Batting: Left-handed
- Bowling: Slow left arm orthodox
- Source: Cricinfo, 13 September 2019

Siyabonga Mahima (born 9 May 1996) is a South African cricketer. He made his Twenty20 debut for Mpumalanga in the 2019–20 CSA Provincial T20 Cup on 13 September 2019. He made his List A debut on 22 January 2021, for Cape Cobras, in the 2020–21 Momentum One Day Cup. On 19 February 2021, on the opening day of the 2020–21 CSA T20 Challenge tournament, Mahima took a hat-trick.

In April 2021, he was named in Boland's squad, ahead of the 2021–22 cricket season in South Africa. He made his first-class debut on 18 November 2021, for Boland in the 2021–22 CSA 4-Day Series.
