= Merrick Brett =

South African cricketer (born 2001)

Personal information
- Born: 14 February 2001 (age 25)
- Source: Cricinfo, 31 March 2021

Merrick Brett (born 14 February 2001) is a South African cricketer. He made his first-class debut on 26 March 2021, for Northerns in the 2020–21 CSA 3-Day Provincial Cup. Prior to his first-class debut, he was named in South Africa's squad for the 2020 Under-19 Cricket World Cup.
