= Waseem Rahman =

South African cricketer (born 1998)

Personal information
- Born: 8 July 1998 (age 28)
- Source: Cricinfo, 6 October 2019

Waseem Rahman (born 8 July 1998) is a South African cricketer. He made his List A debut on 6 October 2019, for KwaZulu-Natal Inland in the 2019–20 CSA Provincial One-Day Challenge. He made his first-class debut on 4 March 2021, for KwaZulu-Natal Inland in the 2020–21 CSA 3-Day Provincial Cup.
