= Sifiso Mahima =

South African cricketer (born 1985)

Personal information
- Born: 1 January 1985 (age 41)
- Died: 11 November 2019
- Source: Cricinfo, 14 September 2019

Sifiso Mahima (born 1 January 1985) is a South African cricketer. He made his Twenty20 debut for Mpumalanga in the 2019–20 CSA Provincial T20 Cup on 14 September 2019.
