= 2022–23 Spain Tri-Nation Series =

International cricket tournament

- Date: 4–6 November 2022
- Location: Spain
- Result: Germany won the tournament
- Player of the series: (Italy) Grant Stewart
Teams
Germany	Italy	Spain
Captains
Venkatraman Ganesan (Note: Michael Richardson captained Germany in all of their matches, with Venkatraman Ganesan not featuring in the playing XI.)	Gian-Piero Meade (Note: Marcus Campopiano captained Italy in their final match against Spain.)	Christian Munoz-Mills
Most runs
Talha Khan (141)	Grant Stewart (197)	Mohammad Kamran (78)
Most wickets
Muslim Yar (6) Dieter Klein (6) Ghulam Ahmadi (6)	Damith Kosala (6)	Yasir Ali (4); Raja Adeel (4); Mohammad Kamran (4)

The 2022–23 Spain Tri-Nation Series was a Twenty20 International (T20I) cricket tournament that was held at the Desert Springs Cricket Ground in Almería from 4 to 6 November 2022. The participating teams were the hosts Spain, along with Germany and Italy.

== Squads ==
Germany	Italy	Spain
Venkatraman Ganesan (c); Michael Richardson (vc, wk); Ghulam Ahmadi; Walter Behr; Elam Bharathi; Dylan Blignaut; Justin Broad; Fayaz Khan; Talha Khan; Dieter Klein; Sachin Mandy (wk); Faisal Mubashir; Sahir Naqash; Abdul Shakoor; Joshua van Heerden; Muslim Yar	Gian-Piero Meade (c); Anik Ahmed; Marcus Campopiano; Achintha Denuwan; Pidusha Fernando; Ali Hasan; Crishan Kalugamage; Damith Kosala; Waleed Rana; Pathirage Sadev (wk); Dinuka Samarawickrama; Anmoldeep Singh; Gurpreet Singh; Grant Stewart	Christian Munoz-Mills (c); Yasir Ali (vc); Raja Adeel; Adam Algar (wk); Mohammad Atif; Lorne Burns; Hamza Dar; Prince Dhiman; Daniel Doyle-Calle (wk); Mohammad Ihsan (wk); Mohammad Kamran; Atif Mehmood; Ravi Panchal; Charlie Rumistrzewicz; Mohammad Yasin

== Points table ==
Pos	Team	Pld	W	L	NR	Pts	NRR
1	Germany	4	3	1	0	6	1.251
2	Spain	4	2	2	0	4	−0.668
3	Italy	4	1	3	0	2	−0.663

Source: ESPNcricinfo

== Fixtures ==
4 November 2022
10:00
Scorecard

Italy; 107 (20 overs)	v	Germany; 109/0 (13.5 overs)
Grant Stewart 54 (40); Muslim Yar 3/9 (4 overs)		Talha Khan 69* (59)

Germany won by 10 wickets
Desert Springs Cricket Ground, Almería
Umpires: Andrew Elliott (Eng) and Adnan Khan (Esp)
Player of the match: Muslim Yar (Ger)

- Italy won the toss and elected to bat.
- Joshua van Heerden (Ger), Anik Ahmed, Pathirage Sadev, Dinuka Samarawickrama, Anmoldeep Singh and Gurpreet Singh (Ita) all made their T20I debuts.

4 November 2022
14:00
Scorecard

Italy; 146/6 (20 overs)	v	Germany; 149/2 (17.2 overs)
Grant Stewart 76 (33); Elam Bharathi 2/14 (4 overs)		Justin Broad 52 (35); Achintha Denuwan 1/17 (2.2 overs)

Germany won by 8 wickets
Desert Springs Cricket Ground, Almería
Umpires: Adnan Khan (Esp) and Nilkesh Patel (Esp)
Player of the match: Justin Broad (Ger)

- Italy won the toss and elected to bat.
- Achintha Denuwan, Pidusha Fernando and Waleed Rana (Ita) all made their T20I debuts.

5 November 2022
10:00
Scorecard

Italy; 161/4 (20 overs)	v	Spain; 165/6 (19 overs)
Grant Stewart 48 (26); Lorne Burns 2/27 (4 overs)		Yasir Ali 43 (40); Anik Ahmed 2/31 (4 overs)

Spain won by 4 wickets
Desert Springs Cricket Ground, Almería
Umpires: Andrew Elliott (Eng) and Adnan Khan (Esp)
Player of the match: Yasir Ali (Esp)

- Italy won the toss and elected to bat.
- Prince Dhiman, Mohammad Ihsan and Mohammad Yasin (Esp) all made their T20I debuts.

5 November 2022
14:00
Scorecard

Germany; 131/7 (20 overs)	v	Spain; 95 (19 overs)
Talha Khan 27 (26); Charlie Rumistrzewicz 3/18 (4 overs)		Christian Munoz-Mills 18 (22); Elam Bharathi 2/14 (4 overs)

Germany won by 36 runs
Desert Springs Cricket Ground, Almería
Umpires: Andrew Elliott (Eng) and Nilkesh Patel (Esp)
Player of the match: Joshua van Heerden (Ger)

- Spain won the toss and elected to field.

6 November 2022
10:00
Scorecard

Spain; 132/7 (20 overs)	v	Germany; 127/6 (20 overs)
Hamza Dar 36 (31); Ghulam Ahmadi 2/20 (4 overs)		Michael Richardson 33 (37); Raja Adeel 3/18 (4 overs)

Spain won by 5 runs
Desert Springs Cricket Ground, Almería
Umpires: Andrew Elliott (Eng) and Nilkesh Patel (Esp)
Player of the match: Raja Adeel (Esp)

- Germany won the toss and elected to field.

6 November 2022
14:00
Scorecard

Italy; 160/3 (20 overs)	v	Spain; 127 (17 overs)
Marcus Campopiano 87* (57); Yasir Ali 1/19 (4 overs)		Mohammad Kamran 52 (33); Ali Hasan 3/9 (3 overs)

Italy won by 33 runs
Desert Springs Cricket Ground, Almería
Umpires: Adnan Khan (Esp) and Nilkesh Patel (Esp)
Player of the match: Marcus Campopiano (Ita)

- Italy won the toss and elected to bat.
