= Johnny Kleinveldt =

South African cricketer (1957–2019)

Personal information
- Born: 6 August 1957; Cape Town, South Africa
- Died: 30 May 2019 (aged 61); Cape Town, South Africa
- Relatives: Matthew Kleinveldt (son); Rory Kleinveldt (nephew)
- Source: Cricinfo, 25 April 2021

Johnny Kleinveldt (6 August 1957 – 30 May 2019) was a South African cricketer. He played in fifteen first-class matches for Western Province and Transvaal from 1979/80 to 1982/83. His sons Matthew and Gary have played cricket, and his nephew, Rory, has played Test matches for South Africa.
