= Marshin Jefta =

South African cricketer (born 1999)

Personal information
- Born: 5 March 1999 (age 27)
- Source: Cricinfo, 25 February 2021

Marshin Jefta (born 5 March 1999) is a South African cricketer. He made his first-class debut on 22 February 2021, for Boland in the 2020–21 CSA 3-Day Provincial Cup.
