= 2019 CSA Provincial T20 Cup =

Cricket tournament

2019–20 CSA Provincial T20 Cup
- Dates: 13 – 24 September 2019
- Administrator: Cricket South Africa
- Cricket format: Twenty20
- Tournament format: Round-robin
- Champions: Easterns (1st title)
- Runners-up: KwaZulu-Natal Inland
- Participants: 15
- Matches: 33
- Most runs: Grant Roelofsen (279)
- Most wickets: Kerwin Mungroo (10)

The 2019–20 CSA Provincial T20 Cup was a domestic Twenty cricket tournament that took place in South Africa in September 2019, as a curtain-raiser to the 2019–20 South African domestic season. It was played between the thirteen South African provincial teams, along with Limpopo and Mpumalanga. This was the sixth edition of the CSA Provincial T20 Cup, which was last played in the 2015–16 season. With only domestic teams from South Africa taking part, the tournament returned in place of the Africa T20 Cup, which had been held since 2015.

On the opening day of matches, Jonathan Vandiar scored an unbeaten century for Northerns against Gauteng in Pool A. In Pool B, Lauren Agenbag became the first woman to umpire in a senior men's provincial match, when she was one of the on-field umpires in the match between Eastern Province and KwaZulu-Natal Inland. In Pool C, the match between Western Province cricket team and North West finished in a tie, with North West winning the Super Over.

Day two of the tournament saw the second tied match in as many days, as KwaZulu-Natal and Easterns finished level on runs in Pool A, with Easterns winning the Super Over. In Pool B, Jacques Snyman scored 117 runs from 58 balls, as Northern Cape beat South Western Districts by 82 runs. Finally in Pool C, Lerato Kgoatle scored his second century in four innings, as Limpopo beat Western Province by 10 wickets.

The third and final day of round-robin matches saw KwaZulu-Natal tie their second match in as many days in Pool A, eventually winning the Super Over against Free State. Easterns, Eastern Province and Border all won their respective groups to progress to the finals of the tournament. They were joined by KwaZulu-Natal Inland, the next best team overall, who finished second in Pool B, and above Limpopo in Pool C on net run rate.

On 16 September 2019, Cricket South Africa confirmed the draw for the semi-final matches. Eastern Province played KwaZulu-Natal Inland in the first semi-final, and Easterns faced Border in the second match. All the knock-out fixtures, including the final, took place at Willowmoore Park in Benoni. KwaZulu-Natal Inland won their semi-final by 21 runs, with Easterns winning their match by nine wickets, with both teams advancing to the final. Easterns won the tournament, beating KwaZulu-Natal Inland by five runs in the final. Grant Thomson, the captain of the Easterns team, said that "it was an excellent game, an excellent final and great end to the competition".

== Pool A ==
=== Squads ===
Easterns	Free State	Gauteng	Northerns	KwaZulu-Natal
Grant Thomson (c); Matthew Arnold (vc); Ryan Cartwright; Neo Felane; Armand Erasmus; Khwezi Gumede; Imran Manack; Wesley Marshall; Sizwe Masondo; Dyllan Matthews; Sabelo Sekhuku; Jurie Snyman; Yaseen Valli; Aron Visser	Patrick Botha (c); Johan van Dyk; Andries Gous; Duan Jansen; Siphamandla Mavanda; Paballo Mogoera; Pheko Moletsane; Thandolwethu Mnyaka; Dilivio Ridgard; Shadley van Schalkwyk; Romano Terblanche; Raynard van Tonder; Sean Whitehead	Nono Pongolo (c); Dominic Hendricks (vc); Mitchell Van Buuren; Eddie Leie; Ayavuya Myoli; Bryce Parsons; Shaylen Pillay; Delano Potgieter; Joshua Richards; Ryan Rickelton; Carmi le Roux; Tumelo Tlhokwe; Codi Yusuf	Dayyaan Galiem; Rubin Hermann; Jarred Jardine; Evan Jones; Gionne Koopman; Victor Mahlangu; Gregory Mahlokwana; Rivaldo Moonsamy; Luvuyo Nkese; Gideon Peters; Diego Rosier; Ruan de Swardt; Jonathan Vandiar; Tony de Zorzi	Calvin Savage (c); Marques Ackerman; Blayde Capell; Khalipha Cele; Daryn Dupavillon; Michael Erlank; Thamsanqa Khumalo; Andile Mokgakane; Thula Ngcobo; Smangaliso Nhlebela; Lifa Ntanzi; Jason Oakes; Prenelan Subrayen

=== Points table ===
Pos	Team	Pld	W	L	T	NR	Pts	NRR
1	Easterns	4	3	1	0	0	13	+0.708
2	KwaZulu-Natal	4	3	1	0	0	12	+0.275
3	Northerns	4	2	2	0	0	9	+1.119
4	Gauteng	4	1	3	0	0	4	-0.434
5	Free State	4	1	3	0	0	4	-1.674

=== Fixtures ===
13 September 2019
09:30
Scorecard

Northerns; 203/4 (20 overs)	v	Free State; 131 (18.2 overs)

Northerns won by 72 runs
Willowmoore Park, Benoni

- Free State won the toss and elected to field.
- Duan Jansen, Siphamandla Mavanda, Paballo Mogoera (Free State), Jarred Jardine, Evan Jones, Gideon Peters and Ruan de Swardt (Northerns) all made their T20 debuts.

13 September 2019
09:30
Scorecard

KwaZulu-Natal; 124/8 (20 overs)	v	Gauteng; 112/8 (20 overs)

KwaZulu-Natal won by 12 runs
Willowmoore Park A Field, Benoni

- Gauteng won the toss and elected to field.
- Joshua Richards (Gauteng), Thamsanqa Khumalo and Lifa Ntanzi (KwaZulu-Natal) all made their T20 debuts.

13 September 2019
13:30
Scorecard

Free State; 134/6 (20 overs)	v	Easterns; 138/1 (13.1 overs)

Easterns won by 9 wickets
Willowmoore Park A Field, Benoni

- Free State won the toss and elected to bat.
- Ryan Cartwright and Khwezi Gumede (Easterns) both made their T20 debuts.

13 September 2019
13:30
Scorecard

Gauteng; 167/3 (20 overs)	v	Northerns; 171/3 (16.2 overs)

Northerns won by 7 wickets
Willowmoore Park, Benoni

- Northerns won the toss and elected to field.

14 September 2019
09:30
Scorecard

KwaZulu-Natal; 171/5 (20 overs)	v	Northerns; 162/8 (20 overs)

KwaZulu-Natal won by 10 runs
Willowmoore Park A Field, Benoni

- Northerns won the toss and elected to field.

14 September 2019
09:30
Scorecard

Gauteng; 150/9 (20 overs)	v	Easterns; 138/6 (20 overs)

Gauteng won by 12 runs
Willowmoore Park, Benoni

- Easterns won the toss and elected to field.
- Bryce Parsons (Gauteng) made his T20 debut.

14 September 2019
13:30
Scorecard

KwaZulu-Natal; 138/6 (20 overs)	v	Easterns; 138/5 (20 overs)

Match tied
(Easterns won the Super Over)
Willowmoore Park, Benoni

- KwaZulu-Natal won the toss and elected to bat.

14 September 2019
13:30
Scorecard

Gauteng; 157/4 (20 overs)	v	Free State; 158/3 (19.5 overs)

Free State won by 7 wickets
Willowmoore Park A Field, Benoni

- Gauteng won the toss and elected to bat.

15 September 2019
09:30
Scorecard

KwaZulu-Natal; 146/6 (20 overs)	v	Free State; 146/5 (20 overs)

Match tied
(KwaZulu-Natal won the Super Over)
Willowmoore Park, Benoni

- Free State won the toss and elected to field.

15 September 2019
13:00
Scorecard

Easterns; 171/6 (20 overs)	v	Northerns; 161/6 (20 overs)

Easterns won by 10 runs
Willowmoore Park, Benoni

- Northerns won the toss and elected to field.

== Pool B ==
=== Squads ===
Boland	Eastern Province	KwaZulu-Natal Inland	Northern Cape	South Western Districts
Ferisco Adams; Craig Alexander; Achille Cloete; Charl Cyster; Reeve Cyster; Fritz de Beer; Isma-eel Gafieldien; Sinalo Gobeni; Simon Khomari; Hanno Kotze; Fenito Mehl; Cebo Tshiki; Lizaad Williams	Mathew Christensen; Jade de Klerk; Thomas Kaber; Sithembile Langa; Marco Marais; Mtabozuko Nqam; Onke Nyaku; Nelson Setimani; Kenan Smith; Kelly Smuts; Joshua van Heerden; Tiaan van Vuuren; Basheeru-Deen Walters	Robert Frylinck; Grant Roelofsen; Kyle Nipper; Gareth Dukes; Cody Chetty; Lwandiswa Zuma; Nduduzo Mfoza; Sohail Mahmoud; Kerwin Mungroo; Mangaliso Mosehle; Luke Schlemmer; Joel Veeran; Michael Booth	Aubrey Swanepoel (c); Ottniel Baartman; Clyde Fortuin; Desmond de Koker; Patrick Kruger; Andrew Louw; Themba Maupa; Kagiso Mohale; Obus Pienaar; Farhaan Sayanvala; Blake Schraader; Jacques Snyman; Beyers Swanepoel	Jean du Plessis; Heath Richards; Yamkela Oliphant; Brendon Louw; Niel Hornbuckle; Aviwe Mgijima; Tladi Bokako; Tsepo Ndwandwa; Bailey Aarons; Mesuli Vuba; Travis Ackerman; Nandre Burger; Akhona Mnyaka

=== Points table ===
Team	Pld	W	L	T	NR	Pts	NRR
Eastern Province	4	3	1	0	0	14	+1.531
KwaZulu-Natal Inland	4	3	1	0	0	13	+0.644888
Northern Cape	4	2	2	0	0	10	+0.783
South Western Districts	4	1	3	0	0	4	–1.927
Boland	4	1	3	0	0	4	–0.868

=== Fixtures ===
13 September 2019
09:30
Scorecard

Eastern Province; 151/2 (20 overs)	v	Boland; 144/7 (20 overs)

Eastern Province won by 7 runs
Diamond Oval, Kimberley

- Boland won the toss and elected to field.
- Achille Cloete, Fenito Mehl (Boland) and Tiaan van Vuuren (Eastern Province) all made their T20 debuts.

13 September 2019
09:30
Scorecard

South Western Districts; 118 (19.1 overs)	v	KwaZulu-Natal Inland; 119/2 (15 overs)

KwaZulu-Natal Inland won by 8 wickets
Country Club B Field, Kimberley

- KwaZulu-Natal Inland won the toss and elected to field.
- Joel Veeran, Michael Booth (KwaZulu-Natal Inland), Heath Richards, Travis Ackerman and Bailey Aarons (South Western Districts) all made their T20 debuts.

13 September 2019
13:30
Scorecard

Eastern Province; 161 (19.5 overs)	v	KwaZulu-Natal Inland; 164/5 (19 overs)

KwaZulu-Natal Inland won by 5 wickets
Diamond Oval, Kimberley

- Eastern Province won the toss and elected to bat.

13 September 2019
13:30
Scorecard

Boland; 104/8 (20 overs)	v	Northern Cape; 106/5 (15.5 overs)

Northern Cape won by 6 wickets
Country Club B Field, Kimberley

- Boland won the toss and elected to bat.
- Andrew Louw, Beyers Swanepoel (Northern Cape) and Isma-eel Gafieldien (Boland) all made their T20 debuts.

14 September 2019
09:30
Scorecard

Northern Cape; 129/7 (20 overs)	v	KwaZulu-Natal Inland; 132/2 (19.1 overs)

KwaZulu-Natal Inland won by 8 wickets
Diamond Oval, Kimberley

- KwaZulu-Natal Inland won the toss and elected to field.

14 September 2019
09:30
Scorecard

Eastern Province; 184/5 (20 overs)	v	South Western Districts; 114/7 (20 overs)

Eastern Province won by 70 runs
Country Club B Field, Kimberley

- South Western Districts won the toss and elected to field.
- Kenan Smith (Eastern Province) made his T20 debut.

14 September 2019
13:30
Scorecard

Northern Cape; 201/8 (20 overs)	v	South Western Districts; 119 (19.1 overs)

Northern Cape won by 82 runs
Diamond Oval, Kimberley

- Northern Cape won the toss and elected to bat.
- Mesuli Vuba (South Western Districts) made his T20 debut.

14 September 2019
13:30
Scorecard

KwaZulu-Natal Inland; 167/5 (20 overs)	v	Boland; 172/6 (19.2 overs)

Boland won by 4 wickets
Country Club B Field, Kimberley

- Boland won the toss and elected to field.

15 September 2019
09:30
Scorecard

South Western Districts; 137/5 (20 overs)	v	Boland; 98 (17.2 overs)

South Western Districts won by 39 runs
Diamond Oval, Kimberley

- South Western Districts won the toss and elected to bat.

15 September 2019
13:00
Scorecard

Northern Cape; 117 (19.3 overs)	v	Eastern Province; 118/2 (13.3 overs)

Eastern Province won by 8 wickets
Diamond Oval, Kimberley

- Northern Cape won the toss and elected to bat.

== Pool C ==
=== Squads ===
Border	Limpopo	Mpumalanga	North West	Western Province
Jason Niemand; Mncedisi Malika; Ayabulela Gqamane; Clayton Bosch; Bamanye Xenxe; Phaphama Fojela; Bongolwethu Makeleni; Joshua Dodd; Gihahn Cloete; Lilitha Reed; Sisanda Magala; Sinethemba Qeshile; Yaseen Vallie	Andrea Agathangelou; Gerhardus Fourie; Thomas Hobson; Ludwig Kaestner; Lerato Kgoatle; Michael Mahlabe; Ryno Marais; Alfred Mothoa; Sahil Patel; Don Radebe; Andrew Rasemene; Lefa Thaba; Michael Weldon	Justin Watson; Benjamin van Niekerk; Alexander Kok; Glen Adams; Tumi Koto; Liam Peters; Jacques Vosloo; Aubrey Ferreira; Thomas Mashiane; Sifiso Mahima; Roger Arendse; Katlego Thena; Siyabonga Mahima	Wihan Lubbe (c); Brady Barends; Nicky van den Bergh; Khanya Cotani; Shane Dadswell; Johannes Diseko; Ruan Haasbroek; Jon Hinrichsen; Katleho Leokaoke; Migael Pretorius; Kagiso Rapulana; Lesego Senokwane; Malusi Siboto	Andre Malan (c); Qaasim Adams; David Bedingham; Junaid Dawood; Isaac Dikgale; Justin Dill; Sisonke Mazele; Mihlali Mpongwana; Thando Ntini; Dane Paterson; Luke Philander; Siyabubela Plaatjie; Jason Smith; Kyle Verreynne

=== Points table ===
Team	Pld	W	L	T	NR	Pts	NRR
Border	4	3	1	0	0	14	+0.416
Limpopo	4	3	1	0	0	13	+0.440
North West	4	2	2	0	0	9	–0.166
Mpumalanga	4	1	3	0	0	5	–0.067
Western Province	4	1	3	0	0	4	–0.604

=== Fixtures ===
13 September 2019
09:30
Scorecard

Western Province; 150/4 (20 overs)	v	Border; 151/5 (18.5 overs)

Border won by 5 wickets
Senwes Park, Potchefstroom

- Western Province won the toss and elected to bat.
- Lilitha Reed (Border), Sisonke Mazele and Isaac Dikgale (Western Province) all made their T20 debuts.

13 September 2019
09:30
Scorecard

Mpumalanga; 172/9 (20 overs)	v	Limpopo; 173/3 (18.2 overs)

Limpopo won by 7 wickets
North-West University No1 Ground, Potchefstroom

- Limpopo won the toss and elected to field.
- Ludwig Kaestner, Michael Mahlabe, Sahil Patel (Limpopo), Alexander Kok, Justin Watson, Siyabonga Mahima and Thomas Mashiane (Mpumalanga) all made their T20 debuts.

13 September 2019
13:30
Scorecard

Border; 174 (19.5 overs)	v	Limpopo; 139/9 (20 overs)

Border won by 35 runs
Senwes Park, Potchefstroom

- Limpopo won the toss and elected to field.
- Joshua Dodd, Bamanye Xenxe (Border), Gerhardus Fourie, Ntokozo Mahlaba and Ryno Marais (Limpopo) all made their T20 debuts.

13 September 2019
13:30
Scorecard

Western Province; 163/6 (20 overs)	v	North West; 163/7 (20 overs)

Match tied
(North West won the Super Over)
North-West University No1 Ground, Potchefstroom

- North West won the toss and elected to field.
- Khanya Cotani (North West) made his T20 debut.

14 September 2019
09:30
Scorecard

North West; 146 (20 overs)	v	Limpopo; 149/3 (18.2 overs)

Limpopo won by 7 wickets
Senwes Park, Potchefstroom

- Limpopo won the toss and elected to field.
- Jon Hinrichsen (North West) made his T20 debut.

14 September 2019
09:30
Scorecard

Mpumalanga; 171/5 (20 overs)	v	Border; 118 (16.5 overs)

Mpumalanga won by 53 runs
North-West University No1 Ground, Potchefstroom

- Border won the toss and elected to field.

14 September 2019
13:30
Scorecard

North West; 171/5 (20 overs)	v	Mpumalanga; 127/8 (20 overs)

North West won by 44 runs
Senwes Park, Potchefstroom

- Mpumalanga won the toss and elected to field.
- Sifiso Mahima (Mpumalanga) made his T20 debut.

14 September 2019
13:30
Scorecard

Western Province; 168/4 (20 overs)	v	Limpopo; 169/0 (15.5 overs)

Limpopo won by 10 wickets
North-West University No1 Ground, Potchefstroom

- Western Province won the toss and elected to bat.
- Mihlali Mpongwana (Western Province) made his T20 debut.

15 September 2019
09:30
Scorecard

Western Province; 165/7 (20 overs)	v	Mpumalanga; 165/7 (20 overs)

Match tied
(Western Province won the Super Over)
Senwes Park, Potchefstroom

- Western Province won the toss and elected to bat.
- Katlego Thena (Western Province) made his T20 debut.

15 September 2019
13:00
Scorecard

Border; 185/4 (20 overs)	v	North West; 144 (18.1 overs)

Border won by 41 runs
Senwes Park, Potchefstroom

- North West won the toss and elected to field.

== Finals ==
1st Semi-Final
23 September 2019
09:30
Scorecard

KwaZulu-Natal Inland; 172/3 (20 overs)	v	Eastern Province; 151/9 (20 overs)

KwaZulu-Natal Inland won by 21 runs
Willowmoore Park, Benoni

- Eastern Province won the toss and elected to field.

2nd Semi-Final
23 September 2019
13:00
Scorecard

Border; 131/9 (20 overs)	v	Easterns; 135/1 (11.3 overs)

Easterns won by 9 wickets
Willowmoore Park, Benoni

- Border won the toss and elected to bat.

Final
24 September 2019
10:00
Scorecard

Easterns; 178/6 (20 overs)	v	KwaZulu-Natal Inland; 173/4 (20 overs)

Easterns won by 5 runs
Willowmoore Park, Benoni

- KwaZulu-Natal Inland won the toss and elected to field.
