= Khanya Cotani =

South African cricketer (born 2000)

Personal information
- Born: 13 September 2000 (age 26)
- Source: Cricinfo, 12 January 2019

Khanya Cotani (born 13 September 2000) is a South African cricketer. He made his first-class debut for North West in the 2018–19 CSA 3-Day Provincial Cup on 10 January 2019. He made his List A debut for North West in the 2018–19 CSA Provincial One-Day Challenge on 20 January 2019. In September 2019, he was named in North West's squad for the 2019–20 CSA Provincial T20 Cup. He made his Twenty20 debut for North West in the 2019–20 CSA Provincial T20 Cup on 13 September 2019. In December 2019, he was named as the vice-captain of South Africa's squad for the 2020 Under-19 Cricket World Cup.
