= Orapeleng Motlhoaring =

South African cricketer (born 2001)

Personal information
- Born: 23 August 2001 (age 25)
- Batting: Right-handed
- Bowling: Right-arm medium
- Role: All-rounder

Domestic team information
- Years: Team
- 2021: Northern Cape
- 2022: Knights
- Source: Cricinfo, 19 March 2021

Orapeleng Motlhoaring (born 23 August 2001) is a South African cricketer. He made his first-class debut on 16 March 2021, for Northern Cape in the 2020–21 CSA 3-Day Provincial Cup. He made his List A debut on 21 March 2021, for Northern Cape in the 2020–21 CSA Provincial One-Day Challenge. He made his Twenty20 debut on 26 September 2021, for Northern Cape in the 2021–22 CSA Provincial T20 Knock-Out tournament.
