= Michael Weldon (cricketer) =

South African cricketer (born 1997)

Personal information
- Born: 8 February 1997 (age 29)
- Source: Cricinfo, 14 September 2018

Michael Weldon (born 8 February 1997) is a South African cricketer. He made his Twenty20 debut for Limpopo in the 2018 Africa T20 Cup on 14 September 2018. In September 2019, he was named in Limpopo's squad for the 2019–20 CSA Provincial T20 Cup.
