= Koko Mokgalong-Mashigo =

South African politician and civil servant

Member of the National Assembly
- In office August 1995 – 1 July 1999

Personal details
- Citizenship: South Africa
- Party: African National Congress
- Education: University of the North; University of Durban-Westville; University of the Western Cape

Moshito Rosina Victoria "Koko" Mokgalong-Mashigo is a South African politician and civil servant who represented the African National Congress (ANC) in the National Assembly from 1995 to 1999. She left her seat in July 1999 when President Thabo Mbeki appointed her to the inaugural Public Service Commission.

== Career ==
Makgalong-Mashigo completed undergraduate teaching degrees at the University of the North (1988) and the University of Durban-Westville (1990) and worked as a high school teacher from 1990 until 1995. In August of that year, she joined the National Assembly, the lower house of the South African Parliament, filling a casual vacancy in the ANC's caucus. During her term, she completed a Master of Public Administration at the University of the Western Cape in 1998.

She was re-elected to her seat in the 1999 general election, representing Limpopo province, but resigned her seat shortly after the election, with effect from 1 July 1999. The same day, she took up office as the Public Service Commissioner for Limpopo. In April 2011, she was appointed to chair the Public Service Sector Education and Training Authority.
