= Michael Mahlabe =

South African cricketer

Personal information
- Full name: Michael Mahlabe
- Source: Cricinfo, 13 September 2019

Michael Mahlabe is a South African cricketer. He made his Twenty20 debut for Limpopo in the 2019–20 CSA Provincial T20 Cup on 13 September 2019. In April 2021, he was named in Limpopo's squad, ahead of the 2021–22 cricket season in South Africa.
