= Achille Cloete =

South African cricketer (born 2001)

Personal information
- Born: 13 July 2001 (age 25)
- Source: Cricinfo, 24 March 2019

Achille Cloete (born 13 July 2001) is a South African cricketer. He made his List A debut for Boland in the 2018–19 CSA Provincial One-Day Challenge on 27 January 2019. In September 2019, he was named in Boland's squad for the 2019–20 CSA Provincial T20 Cup. He made his Twenty20 debut for Boland in the 2019–20 CSA Provincial T20 Cup on 13 September 2019. In December 2019, he was named in South Africa's squad for the 2020 Under-19 Cricket World Cup.

In April 2021, he was named in Boland's squad, ahead of the 2021–22 cricket season in South Africa. He made his first-class debut on 5 November 2021, for Dolphins in the 2021–22 CSA 4-Day Series.
