= Sahil Patel =

South African cricketer (born 1997)

Personal information
- Born: 10 November 1997 (age 29)
- Source: Cricinfo, 13 September 2019

Sahil Patel (born 10 November 1997) is a South African cricketer. He made his Twenty20 debut for Limpopo in the 2019–20 CSA Provincial T20 Cup on 13 September 2019. He made his First class debut for Limpopo in the 2022–23 CSA 4-Day Series on 23 February 2023.
