= Mesuli Vuba =

South African cricketer (born 1997)

Personal information
- Born: 4 February 1997 (age 29)
- Source: Cricinfo, 4 November 2018

Mesuli Vuba (born 4 February 1997) is a South African cricketer. He made his List A debut for South Western Districts in the 2018–19 CSA Provincial One-Day Challenge on 4 November 2018. He made his first-class debut for South Western Districts in the 2018–19 CSA 3-Day Provincial Cup on 14 February 2019. He made his Twenty20 debut for South Western Districts in the 2019–20 CSA Provincial T20 Cup on 14 September 2019.
