= Lerato Kgoatle =

South African cricketer (born 1993)

Personal information
- Born: 9 September 1993 (age 33); Mamelodi, South Africa
- Source: Cricinfo, 1 September 2015

Lerato Joel Kgoatle (born 9 September 1993) is a South African cricketer. He was included in the Northerns cricket team squad for the 2015 Africa T20 Cup. In September 2018, he was named in Limpopo's squad for the 2018 Africa T20 Cup. In September 2019, he was named in Limpopo's squad for the 2019–20 CSA Provincial T20 Cup. In his first four innings of the tournament, he scored two unbeaten centuries.
