= Kabelo Sekhukhune =

South African cricketer (born 1997)

Personal information
- Born: 16 July 1997 (age 29); Johannesburg, South Africa
- Relatives: Tumi Sekhukhune (cousin)
- Source: Cricinfo, 25 March 2017

Kabelo Sekhukhune (born 16 July 1997) is a South African cricketer. He made his first-class debut for Easterns in the 2014–15 Sunfoil 3-Day Cup on 6 November 2014. In September 2018, he was named in Easterns' squad for the 2018 Africa T20 Cup. In April 2021, Sekhukhune was named in the South Africa Emerging Men's squad for their six-match tour of Namibia. Later the same month, he was named in Eastern Province's squad, ahead of the 2021–22 cricket season in South Africa.
