= Nhlanhla Mashigo =

South African cricketer

Personal information
- Full name: Nhlanhla Mashigo
- Born: 6 January 2002 (age 24); KwaThema, Ekurhuleni, South Africa
- Batting: Right-handed
- Role: Batsman

Domestic team information
- Years: Team
- 2022–present: Easterns
- First-class debut: 9 March 2023 Easterns v Limpopo
- List A debut: 3 April 2022 Easterns v KwaZulu-Natal Inland
- Source: ESPNcricinfo, 14 April 2023

Nhlanhla Mashigo (born 6 January 2002) is a South African cricketer, who is a right-handed batsman. He plays for Easterns in domestic cricket.

== Early years ==
He completed his primary education from Theo Twala Primary School. He played five matches for the Eastern under-19 cricket team in the 2015–16 CSA Under-13 Week. He also made one appearance in school level cricket for Jeppe High School for Boys in October 2019.

== Domestic career ==
He made his List A debut for Easterns on 3 April 2022, against KwaZulu-Natal Inland in the 2021–22 CSA One-Day Cup. He made his Twenty20 debut for Easterns on 30 September 2022, against South Africa Under-19s in the 2022–23 CSA Provincial T20 Cup. He made his first-class debut on 9 March 2023, for Easterns against Limpopo in the 2022–23 CSA 4-Day Series.
