= Gerhardus Fourie =

South African cricketer (born 2002)

Personal information
- Born: 14 February 2002 (age 24)
- Source: Cricinfo, 13 September 2019

Gerhardus Fourie (born 14 February 2002) is a South African cricketer. He made his Twenty20 debut for Limpopo in the 2019–20 CSA Provincial T20 Cup on 13 September 2019.
