= Thomas Mashiane =

South African cricketer (born 1996)

Personal information
- Born: 31 May 1996 (age 30)
- Source: Cricinfo, 17 March 2019

Thomas Mashiane (born 31 May 1996) is a South African cricketer. He made his List A debut for Northerns in the 2018–19 CSA Provincial One-Day Challenge on 17 March 2019. He made his Twenty20 debut for Mpumalanga in the 2019–20 CSA Provincial T20 Cup on 13 September 2019.
