= Lefa Thaba =

South African cricketer (born 1991)

Personal information
- Born: 5 August 1991 (age 35)
- Source: Cricinfo, 30 November 2017

Lefa Thaba (born 5 August 1991) is a South African cricketer. He made his first-class debut for Gauteng in the 2017–18 Sunfoil 3-Day Cup on 30 November 2017. In September 2018, he was named in Limpopo's squad for the 2018 Africa T20 Cup. He made his Twenty20 debut for Limpopo in the 2018 Africa T20 Cup on 14 September 2018. He was the leading run-scorer for Limpopo in the tournament, with 101 runs in four matches.

In September 2019, he was named in Limpopo's squad for the 2019–20 CSA Provincial T20 Cup.
