= Justin Watson (cricketer) =

South African cricketer (born 1998)

Personal information
- Born: 18 February 1998 (age 28)
- Source: Cricinfo, 13 September 2019

Justin Watson (born 18 February 1998) is a South African cricketer. He made his Twenty20 debut for Mpumalanga in the 2019–20 CSA Provincial T20 Cup on 13 September 2019.
