= Divan Posthumus =

South African cricketer

Personal information
- Full name: Divan Posthumus
- Born: 2 June 1994 (age 32); Kempton Park, Johannesburg, South Africa
- Batting: Right-handed
- Bowling: Right-arm medium
- Role: Batting all-rounder

Career statistics
Competition	FC	LA
Matches	4	2
Runs scored	198	14
Batting average	24.75	7.00
100s/50s	0/2	0/0
Top score	55	13
Balls bowled	655	84
Wickets	16	6
Bowling average	26.60	42.00
5 wickets in innings	1	0
10 wickets in match	–	–
Best bowling	5/59	3/15
Catches/stumpings	1/–	0/–
- Source: Cricinfo, 16 March 2022

Divan Posthumus (born 2 June 1994) is a South African cricketer who plays for the Easterns cricket team.

== Career ==
Posthumus originally started playing cricket for the Easterns Under-19 cricket team during the 2012–13 Coca-Cola Khaya Majole season. He was then selected to play for the Easterns for the 2021-22 CSA 4-Day Series. He made his first-class debut on 18 November 2021, against the South Westerns Districts cricket team. Posthumus also played matches against the Northern Cape, Mpumalanga, and Border cricket teams throughout the entirety of Division 2. In March 2022, Posthumus was named in the Easterns squad for the 2021-22 CSA Provincial One-Day Challenge. Posthumus made his List A debut on 16 March 2022, against South Western Districts.
