= Isaac Dikgale =

South African cricketer (born 1995)

Personal information
- Born: 14 May 1995 (age 31)
- Batting: Right-handed
- Bowling: Right-arm medium
- Source: ESPNcricinfo, 4 September 2016

Isaac Dikgale (born 14 May 1995) is a South African cricketer. He is a right-handed batsman and medium bowler. In September 2018, he was named in Western Province's squad for the 2018 Africa T20 Cup. In September 2019, he was named in Western Province's squad for the 2019–20 CSA Provincial T20 Cup. He made his Twenty20 debut for Western Province in the 2019–20 CSA Provincial T20 Cup on 13 September 2019. In April 2021, he was named in Northern Cape's squad, ahead of the 2021–22 cricket season in South Africa.
