= Tshepo Mangena =

South African cricketer

Tshepo Mangena (born 7 March 1983) was a South African cricketer. He was a left-handed batsman and a right-arm medium-fast bowler and wicket-keeper who played for Limpopo. He was born in Phalaborwa in a location called Namakgale.

Mangena's first cricketing appearance came in the UCB Associates Cup, though he failed to make much of an impression with the bat from the opening order.

Almost exactly two years later, Mangena made his debut first-class appearance for Limpopo, against Griqualand West. He made one further first-class appearance in the competition, and a one-day appearance, with a top first-class score of 19 runs.
