= Andrew Louw (cricketer) =

South African cricketer (born 2000)

Personal information
- Born: 18 September 2000 (age 26)
- Source: Cricinfo, 13 September 2019

Andrew Louw (born 18 September 2000) is a South African cricketer. He made his Twenty20 debut for Northern Cape in the 2019–20 CSA Provincial T20 Cup on 13 September 2019. In December 2019, he was named in South Africa's squad for the 2020 Under-19 Cricket World Cup.
