= Johan van Dyk =

South African cricketer (born 1994)

Personal information
- Full name: Johannes Hendrik van Dyk
- Born: 23 January 1994 (age 32); Bloemfontein, South Africa
- Source: ESPNcricinfo, 22 January 2017

Johan van Dyk (born 23 January 1994) is a South African cricketer. He made his first-class debut for Free State in the 2014–15 Sunfoil 3-Day Cup on 19 February 2015. He made his List A debut for Free State in the 2016–17 CSA Provincial One-Day Challenge on 12 March 2017.

In September 2019, he was named in Free State's squad for the 2019–20 CSA Provincial T20 Cup. In April 2021, he was named in Northern Cape's squad, ahead of the 2021–22 cricket season in South Africa.
