= Matthew Kleinveldt =

English cricketer

Personal information
- Full name: Matthew Caleb Kleinveldt
- Born: 10 August 1989 (age 37); Southampton, Hampshire, England
- Nickname: Kleiney, Matt
- Height: 5 ft 9 in (1.75 m)
- Batting: Left-handed
- Bowling: Right-arm off break
- Role: Opening batsman
- Relatives: Johnny Kleinveldt (father); Rory Kleinveldt (cousin)

Domestic team information
- Years: Team
- 2009/10–present: Western Province
- 2012/13–present: Cape Cobras

Career statistics
Competition	FC	LA	T20
Matches	109	57	16
Runs scored	6,239	1,371	180
Batting average	36.06	24.48	13.84
100s/50s	13/31	3/5	0/0
Top score	175	134	34
Balls bowled	5,466	1,515	126
Wickets	101	42	4
Bowling average	30.60	26.30	34.25
5 wickets in innings	0	1	0
10 wickets in match	0	0	0
Best bowling	3/6	5/23	1/12
Catches/stumpings	48/–	13/–	4/–
- Source: ESPNcricinfo

Matthew Caleb Kleinveldt (born 10 August 1989) is an English-born South African professional cricketer. Though born and bred in England, Kleinveldt rejected an offer to play for Hampshire due to England's new stern sporting visa requirements. He duly moved back to South Africa to start a cricketing career there. Kleinveldt is also cousin of ex-Protea cricketer Rory Kleinveldt.

== Domestic career ==
Though born in England, Kleinveldt made his professional cricketing debuts all in South Africa. A tall, elegant left-handed batsman, Kleinveldt had a respectable first-class debut scoring 41 in the first innings and 13 in the second, against Eastern Province in 2010. He made his debut for the Cape Cobras in early 2012 scoring 9 runs against the Dolphins before being dismissed.

He then made another debut for the Cape Cobras in 2015 in their Four-day Test against the Dolphins where he scored 99 runs.

He was the leading run-scorer in the 2017–18 Sunfoil 3-Day Cup for Western Province, with 446 runs in nine matches. He was also the leading run-scorer for Western Province in the 2018–19 CSA 3-Day Provincial Cup, with 629 runs in eight matches, and the leading run-scorer for Western Province in the 2018–19 CSA Provincial One-Day Challenge, with 426 runs in ten matches.

In April 2021, he was named in Free State's squad, ahead of the 2021–22 cricket season in South Africa.
