= Renaldo Meyer =

South African cricketer (born 1994)

Personal information
- Born: 30 June 1994 (age 32)
- Source: Cricinfo, 7 February 2019

Renaldo Meyer (born 30 June 1994) is a South African cricketer. He made his first-class debut for Western Province in the 2017–18 Sunfoil 3-Day Cup on 26 October 2017. He made his List A debut for Western Province in the 2018–19 CSA Provincial One-Day Challenge on 14 October 2018. In April 2021, he was named in South Western Districts' squad, ahead of the 2021–22 cricket season in South Africa. He made his Twenty20 debut on 24 September 2021, for South Western Districts in the 2021–22 CSA Provincial T20 Knock-Out tournament.
