= Sean Whitehead =

South African cricketer

Personal information
- Full name: Sean Andre Whitehead
- Born: 7 March 1997 (age 29); Klerksdorp, North West, South Africa
- Batting: Right-handed
- Bowling: Slow left-arm orthodox

Domestic team information
- Years: Team
- 2016/17–2020/21: Free State
- 2021/22–2022/23: South Western Districts
- 2023/24: Eastern Province
- 2024/25: KwaZulu-Natal Inland
- 2024/25: KwaZulu-Natal

Career statistics
| Competition | FC | LA | T20 |
|---|---|---|---|
| Matches | 30 | 26 | 21 |
| Runs scored | 926 | 241 | 69 |
| Batting average | 29.87 | 24.10 | 9.85 |
| 100s/50s | 2/5 | 0/2 | 0/0 |
| Top score | 155* | 61 | 22* |
| Balls bowled | 5,515 | 1,324 | 432 |
| Wickets | 108 | 33 | 15 |
| Bowling average | 21.97 | 26.00 | 29.13 |
| 5 wickets in innings | 6 | 0 | 0 |
| 10 wickets in match | 1 | 0 | 0 |
| Best bowling | 10/36 | 3/21 | 2/13 |
| Catches/stumpings | 12/– | 2/– | 8/– |
- Source: ESPNcricinfo, 15 July 2025

Sean Andre Whitehead (born 7 March 1997) is a South African cricketer. He made his Twenty20 debut for Free State against Zimbabwe in the 2016 Africa T20 Cup on 9 September 2016. Prior to his Twenty20 debut, he was part of South Africa's squad for the 2016 Under-19 Cricket World Cup. He made his first-class debut for Free State in the 2016–17 Sunfoil 3-Day Cup on 8 December 2016.

In September 2018, he was named in Free State's squad for the 2018 Africa T20 Cup. In September 2019, he was named in Free State's squad for the 2019–20 CSA Provincial T20 Cup. In April 2021, he was named in South Western Districts' squad, ahead of the 2021–22 cricket season in South Africa. In November 2021, in the Division 2 match between South Western Districts and Easterns in the 2021–22 CSA 4-Day Series, Whitehead took all ten wickets in the second innings for South Western Districts, recording the second-best figures in a domestic first-class match in South Africa.
