= Joshua van Heerden =

South African cricketer (born 1998)

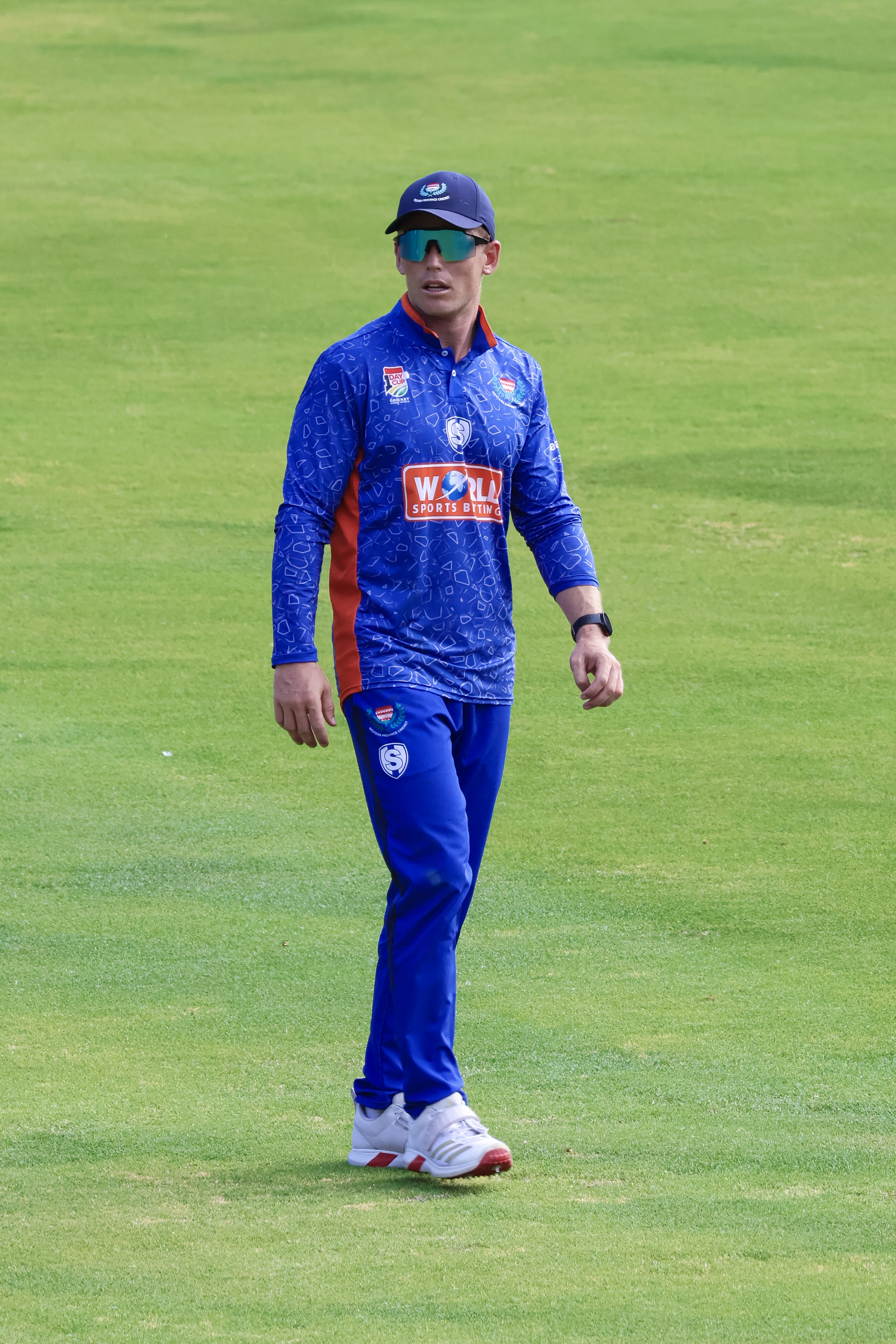
- Joshua van Heerden playing for Western Province in 2026

Personal information
- Born: 26 June 1998 (age 28); Pretoria, South Africa
- Batting: Right-handed
- Role: Batter

International information
- National side: Germany
- T20I debut (cap 37): 4 November 2022 v Italy
- Last T20I: 28 July 2023 v Italy

Domestic team information
- Years: Team
- 2020-2021: Eastern Province
- 2021-2023: Border
- 2023-2024: Titans
- 2025-present: Western Province

Career statistics
Competition	FC	LA	T20	T20I
Matches	39	25	32	10
Runs scored	2161	870	828	271
Batting average	34.85	45.78	33.12	45.16
100s/50s	3/11	3/3	0.5	0/1
Top score	163	147*	75	53*
Balls bowled	162	-	58	58
Wickets	1	-	4	4
Bowling average	97.00	-	14.50	14.50
5 wickets in innings	-	-	-	-
10 wickets in match	-	-	-	-
Best bowling	1/14	-	2/17	2/17
Catches/stumpings	31/0	9/1	14/0	6/0
- Source: Cricinfo, 12 March 2026

Joshua van Heerden (born 26 June 1998) is a German-South African cricketer. He made his Twenty20 debut for Eastern Province in the 2018 Africa T20 Cup on 14 September 2018. He made his first-class debut for Eastern Province in the 2018–19 CSA 3-Day Provincial Cup on 11 October 2018. He made his List A debut, also for Eastern Province, in the 2018–19 CSA Provincial One-Day Challenge on 13 January 2019. He was part of Eastern Province's squad for the 2019–20 CSA Provincial T20 Cup. In April 2021, he was named in Border's squad, ahead of the 2021–22 cricket season in South Africa.

In October 2022, he was named in Germany's Twenty20 International (T20I) squad for the 2022–23 Spain Tri-Nation Series. He made his T20I debut for Germany against Italy on 4 November 2022.
