= Alexander Kok (cricketer) =

South African cricketer (born 1998)

Personal information
- Born: 24 May 1998 (age 28)
- Source: Cricinfo, 13 September 2019

Alexander Kok (born 24 May 1998) is a South African cricketer. He made his Twenty20 debut for Mpumalanga in the 2019–20 CSA Provincial T20 Cup on 13 September 2019. In April 2021, he was named in Mpumalanga's squad, ahead of the 2021–22 cricket season in South Africa.
