= Ntokozo Mahlaba =

South African cricketer (born 1999)

Personal information
- Born: 11 December 1999 (age 26)
- Source: Cricinfo, 13 September 2019

Ntokozo Mahlaba (born 11 December 1999) is a South African cricketer. He made his Twenty20 debut for Limpopo in the 2019–20 CSA Provincial T20 Cup on 13 September 2019.
