= Ludwig Kaestner =

South African cricketer (born 2000)

Personal information
- Full name: Ludwig Hugo Kaestner
- Born: 19 June 2000 (age 26); Pretoria, Gauteng, South Africa
- Batting: Right-handed
- Bowling: Right-arm off-spin
- Role: Opening batsman
- Source: Cricinfo, 13 September 2019

Ludwig Kaestner (born 19 June 2000) is a South African cricketer. He made his Twenty20 debut for Limpopo in the 2019–20 CSA Provincial T20 Cup on 13 September 2019. In April 2021, he was named in Limpopo's squad, ahead of the 2021–22 cricket season in South Africa.

When Limpopo returned to first-class status in the 2022–23 season, Kaestner was appointed captain, although he had yet to play at first-class level. In their third match, in November 2022 at Polokwane, Kaestner led them to their first first-class victory in the match against Mpumalanga.
