= Thomas Hobson (cricketer) =

South African cricketer (born 1994)

Personal information
- Born: 18 May 1994 (age 32)
- Source: Cricinfo, 14 September 2018

Thomas Hobson (born 18 May 1994) is a South African cricketer. He made his Twenty20 debut for Limpopo in the 2018 Africa T20 Cup on 14 September 2018. In September 2019, he was named in Limpopo's squad for the 2019–20 CSA Provincial T20 Cup. In April 2021, he was named in Limpopo's squad, ahead of the 2021–22 cricket season in South Africa.
