= 2020–21 CSA 4-Day Franchise Series =

Cricket tournament

- Dates: 2 November 2020 – 29 March 2021
- Administrator: Cricket South Africa
- Cricket format: First-class
- Tournament format: Double round-robin
- Champions: Dolphins (1st title)
- Participants: 6
- Matches: 22
- Most runs: Aiden Markram (945)
- Most wickets: Keshav Maharaj (34)

The 2020–21 CSA 4-Day Franchise Series was a first-class cricket competition that took place in South Africa from November 2020 to March 2021. Six teams took part in the tournament, split into two groups. Lions were the defending champions.

Ahead of the opening round of fixtures, Warriors withdrew six members of its team due to COVID-19. Two players tested positive, with another four players withdrawn from being in direct contact with the two positive cases. The round five fixture between Titans and Dolphins was called off on the morning of day two, after a player returned a positive test for COVID-19. As a result of the increase in positive COVID-19 cases, the sixth round of matches, originally scheduled to start on 20 December 2020, was postponed until 2021.

In February 2021, Cricket South Africa issued a revised schedule for the last two rounds and the final of the tournament. The following month, Cricket South Africa also confirmed that this was the last season of franchise cricket, following a revamp to their domestic structure. Following the conclusion of the group stage, Dolphins and Titans had qualified for the final of the tournament. Despite nearly two days of play being lost due to rain, Dolphins went on to win the final by an innings and 76 runs, winning their first outright title.

== Points tables ==
Pool A

Team	Pld	W	L	D	N/R	Pts
Dolphins	7	4	1	2	0	126.08
Knights	7	3	3	1	0	102.08
Lions	7	2	3	2	0	84.22

Pool B

Team	Pld	W	L	D	N/R	Pts
Titans	7	2	1	4	0	98.88
Cape Cobras	7	1	2	4	0	86.58
Warriors	7	2	4	1	0	76.68

== Fixtures ==
=== Round 1 ===
2–5 November 2020
Scorecard

Lions	v	Dolphins
258 (89.1 overs); Reeza Hendricks 76 (86); Ottniel Baartman 4/41 (23 overs)		458/3d (119.3 overs); Sarel Erwee 199 (282); Dwaine Pretorius 1/44 (21 overs)
210 (82.4 overs); Reeza Hendricks 38 (84); Keshav Maharaj 6/101 (38.4 overs)		11/1 (2.4 overs); Sarel Erwee 7* (8); Aaron Phangiso 1/3 (1 over)

Dolphins won by 9 wickets
Kingsmead Cricket Ground, Durban
Umpires: Dennis Smith and Lubabalo Gcuma

- Dolphins won the toss and elected to field.

2–5 November 2020
Scorecard

Knights	v	Warriors
430/6d (105 overs); Jacques Snyman 109 (78); Marco Jansen 3/86 (22 overs)		158 (74 overs); Matthew Breetzke 43 (83); Shaun von Berg 4/54 (20 overs)
93/8d (26.1 overs); Jacques Snyman 33 (44); Mthiwekhaya Nabe 3/21 (5 overs)		186 (76.5 overs); Matthew Breetzke 77* (214); Mbulelo Budaza 4/47 (13.5 overs)

Knights won by 179 runs
Mangaung Oval, Bloemfontein
Umpires: Ryan Hendricks and Stephen Harris

- Knights won the toss and elected to bat.

2–5 November 2020
Scorecard

Cape Cobras	v	Titans
264/9d (91 overs); Pieter Malan 51 (102); Tabraiz Shamsi 3/80 (24 overs)		150 (51.2 overs); Dean Elgar 101* (143); George Linde 5/65 (18 overs)
201 (78.3 overs); Kyle Verreynne 85 (187); Tabraiz Shamsi 4/79 (22.3 overs)		316/8 (103.1 overs); Theunis de Bruyn 127 (204); George Linde 2/123 (42.1)

Titans won by 2 wickets
Newlands Cricket Ground, Cape Town
Umpires: Marais Erasmus and Abdoellah Steenkamp

- Cape Cobras won the toss and elected to bat.

=== Round 2 ===
9–12 November 2020
Scorecard

Warriors	v	Titans
231 (73.5 overs); Gihahn Cloete 66 (173); Lizaad Williams 4/64 (23 overs)		293 (103. overs); Heinrich Klaasen 68 (106); Mthiwekhaya Nabe 3/54 (18.4 overs)
124 (54.2 overs); Sinethemba Qeshile 28 (49); Tabraiz Shamsi 8/32 (16.2 overs)		63/2 (9 overs); Heinrich Klaasen 20* (19); Mthiwekhaya Nabe 2/27 (4 overs)

Titans won by 8 wickets
St George's Park Cricket Ground, Port Elizabeth
Umpires: Arno Jacobs and Shaun George

- Warriors won the toss and elected to bat.
- Only 45 overs were bowled on day 1 due to rain.
- Tabraiz Shamsi took the best bowling figures for Titans in a first-class match.

9–12 November 2020
Scorecard

Knights	v	Dolphins
424 (129.4 overs); Raynard van Tonder 166 (285); Ruan de Swardt 2/39 (18 overs)		162 (42.5 overs); Ruan de Swardt 46 (54); Alfred Mothoa 4/35 (13 overs)
194/4d (56.3 overs); Pite van Biljon 93 (125); Senuran Muthusamy 2/19 (4.3 overs)		243 (77.2 overs); Sarel Erwee 81 (185); Migael Pretorius 4/52 (19.1 overs)

Knights won by 227 runs
Mangaung Oval, Bloemfontein
Umpires: Bongani Jele and Stephen Harris

- Knights won the toss and elected to bat.
- Lifa Ntanzi (Dolphins) made his first-class debut.

9–12 November 2020
Scorecard

Cape Cobras	v	Lions
115 (37.5 overs); Kyle Verreynne 51 (66); Beuran Hendricks 7/29 (13 overs)		324 (116.3 overs); Dominic Hendricks 130 (323); Nandre Burger 4/101 (31.3 overs)
302/7 (115 overs); George Linde 69* (169); Beuran Hendricks 3/56 (25 overs)

Match drawn
Wanderers Stadium, Johannesburg
Umpires: Allahudien Paleker and Adrian Holdstock

- Cape Cobras won the toss and elected to bat.

=== Round 3 ===
23–26 November 2020
Scorecard

Dolphins	v	Cape Cobras
389/8d (125.3 overs); Khaya Zondo 105 (193); Corbin Bosch 2/64 (24.3 overs)		312 (100 overs); Tony de Zorzi 58 (117); Senuran Muthusamy 4/58 (18 overs)
217/4d (50 overs); Sarel Erwee 56 (73); Aviwe Mgijima 4/77 (18 overs)		155/6 (62 overs); Pieter Malan 45 (103); Senuran Muthusamy 4/56 (25 overs)

Match drawn
Kingsmead Cricket Ground, Durban
Umpires: Dennis Smith and Lubabalo Gcuma

- Cape Cobras won the toss and elected to field.

23–26 November 2020
Scorecard

Knights	v	Lions
300 (84.1 overs); Migael Pretorius 79* (104); Sisanda Magala 6/60 (16.1 overs)		202 (58 overs); Kagiso Rapulana 44 (89); Migael Pretorius 4/40 (15 overs)
235 (78 overs); Jonathan Vandiar 68 (108); Delano Potgieter 4/41 (18 overs)		336/6 (85.5 overs); Joshua Richards 136 (181); Andrew Rasemene 3/44 (17 overs)

Lions won by 4 wickets
Wanderers Stadium, Johannesburg
Umpires: Siphelele Gasa and Phillip Vosloo

- Lions won the toss and elected to field.

23–26 November 2020
Scorecard

Titans	v	Warriors
320 (86.4 overs); Aiden Markram 149 (190); Marco Jansen 3/69 (20 overs)		392 (91.3 overs); Sinethemba Qeshile 97 (175); Okuhle Cele 4/88 (19.2 overs)
289 (87.1 overs); Aiden Markram 121 (193); Marco Jansen 4/66 (18 overs)		218/7 (53 overs); Yaseen Vallie 55 (69); Neil Brand 4/37 (13 overs)

Warriors won by 3 wickets
Centurion Park, Centurion
Umpires: Brad White and Mazizi Gampu

- Warriors won the toss and elected to field.

=== Round 4 ===
30 November–3 December 2020
Scorecard

Lions	v	Warriors
388 (98 overs); Wesley Marshall 145 (160); Basheeru-Deen Walters 5/61 (22 overs)		118 (47.1 overs); Edward Moore 23 (73); Sisanda Magala 3/37 (13 overs)
241/5d (58.4 overs); Wiaan Mulder 100* (109); Marco Jansen 2/22 (9 overs)		436 (114.3 overs); Rudi Second 171 (246); Delano Potgieter 3/51 (18 overs)

Lions won by 76 runs
St George's Park Cricket Ground, Port Elizabeth
Umpires: Phillip Vosloo and Stephen Harris

- Lions won the toss and elected to bat.

30 November–3 December 2020
Scorecard

Knights	v	Dolphins
116 (42.3 overs); Jonathan Vandiar 39 (96); Daryn Dupavillon 7/38 (14.3 overs)		253 (69 overs); Grant Roelofsen 73 (106); Patrick Botha 3/35 (9.4 overs)
213 (85.2 overs); Matthew Kleinveldt 77 (191); Daryn Dupavillon 4/66 (18.2 overs)		78/5 (20.2 overs); Keegan Petersen 28* (49); Shaun von Berg 3/12 (5.2 overs)

Dolphins won by 5 wickets
Kingsmead Cricket Ground, Durban
Umpires: Abongile Sodumo and Murray Brown

- Knights won the toss and elected to bat.

30 November–3 December 2020
Scorecard

Cape Cobras	v	Titans
411 (116.3 overs); Pieter Malan 125 (221); Thando Ntini 3/66 (20.3 overs)		440 (134.4 overs); Neil Brand 115 (278); Calvin Savage 5/77 (22.4 overs)
207/5 (74 overs); Pieter Malan 57 (142); Thando Ntini 2/26 (13 overs)

Match drawn
Centurion Park, Centurion
Umpires: Brad White and Abdoellah Steenkamp

- Titans won the toss and elected to field.

=== Round 5 ===
13–16 December 2020
Scorecard

Warriors	v	Cape Cobras
194 (64 overs); Rudi Second 55 (99); George Linde 4/52 (19 overs)		255 (90.4 overs); Kyle Verreynne 97 (177); JJ Smuts 3/40 (16.4 overs)
325 (92.3 overs); Rudi Second 114 (154); Calvin Savage 4/81 (22 overs)		184 (73.1 overs); Janneman Malan 65 (143); JJ Smuts 3/47 (16.1 overs)

Warriors won by 80 runs
St George's Park Cricket Ground, Port Elizabeth
Umpires: Shaun George and Ryan Hendricks

- Warriors won the toss and elected to bat.

13–16 December 2020
Scorecard

Knights	v	Lions
472 (140.2 overs); Raynard van Tonder 200 (261); Wiaan Mulder 2/68 (18 overs)		262 (82.2 overs); Rassie van der Dussen 107* (203); Shaun von Berg 5/93 (28 overs)
18/1 (6 overs); Matthew Kleinveldt 8* (18); Delano Potgieter 1/11 (3 overs)		227 (72.4 overs) (f/o); Dominic Hendricks 98 (205); Duan Jansen 4/44 (12.4 overs)

Knights won by 9 wickets
Mangaung Oval, Bloemfontein
Umpires: Allahudien Paleker and Bongani Jele

- Knights won the toss and elected to bat.

13–16 December 2020
Scorecard

Titans	v	Dolphins
269/9 (85 overs); Aiden Markram 75 (150); Ruan de Swardt 4/41 (15 overs)

Match drawn
Centurion Park, Centurion
Umpires: Marais Erasmus and Adrian Holdstock

- Titans won the toss and elected to bat.
- The match was called off on the morning of day two after a player returned a positive test for COVID-19.

=== Round 6 ===
7–10 March 2021
Scorecard

Cape Cobras	v	Warriors
513/6d (144 overs); Kyle Verreynne 216* (327); Glenton Stuurman 2/12 (5.3 overs)		259/9 (78 overs); Ayabulela Gqamane 55 (92); Akhona Mnyaka 3/41 (13 overs)

Match drawn
Newlands Cricket Ground, Cape Town
Umpires: Arno Jacobs and Thomas Mokorosi

- Cape Cobras won the toss and elected to bat.
- No play was possible on day 4 due to rain.

7–10 March 2021
Scorecard

Titans	v	Knights
263 (89.5 overs); Neil Brand 107 (221); Mbulelo Budaza 4/50 (16 overs)		414/9d (132 overs); Farhaan Behardien 142 (268); Lizaad Williams 4/103 (30 overs)
383/3 (115 overs); Aiden Markram 204* (342); Shaun von Berg 2/116 (29 overs)

Match drawn
Centurion Park, Centurion
Umpires: Adrian Holdstock and Lubabalo Gcuma

- Titans won the toss and elected to bat.

7–10 March 2021
Scorecard

Dolphins	v	Lions
375 (92.5 overs); Eathan Bosch 104 (127); Lutho Sipamla 3/53 (18 overs)		362 (111.4 overs); Ryan Rickelton 194 (311); Keshav Maharaj 6/126 (43 overs)
235 (47.5 overs); Keshav Maharaj 89 (62); Wiaan Mulder 4/37 (8 overs)		162 (53 overs); Nicky van den Bergh 45 (101); Keshav Maharaj 7/48 (23 overs)

Dolphins won by 86 runs
Wanderers Stadium, Johannesburg
Umpires: Siphelele Gasa and Stephen Harris

- Dolphins won the toss and elected to bat.

=== Round 7 ===
16–19 March 2021
Scorecard

Knights	v	Cape Cobras
181 (63.4 overs); Raynard van Tonder 47 (120); Tshepo Moreki 4/54 (16 overs)		523/8d (176.3 overs); Pieter Malan 264 (507); Patrick Kruger 3/45 (14 overs)
127 (63.2 overs); Farhaan Behardien 48* (143); George Linde 7/29 (21.2 overs)

Cape Cobras won by an innings and 215 runs
Newlands Cricket Ground, Cape Town
Umpires: Adrian Holdstock and Marais Erasmus

- Knights won the toss and elected to bat.

16–19 March 2021
Scorecard

Lions	v	Titans
206 (66.3 overs); Dominic Hendricks 99 (151); Lizaad Williams 3/54 (17 overs)		202 (75 overs); Aiden Markram 100 (209); Lutho Sipamla 5/37 (14 overs)
308/9d (80 overs); Reeza Hendricks 96 (162); Lizaad Williams 4/74 (18 overs)		149/2 (48 overs); Dean Elgar 68 (121); Bjorn Fortuin 1/12 (7 overs)

Match drawn
Wanderers Stadium, Johannesburg
Umpires: Allahudien Paleker and Bongani Jele

- Lions won the toss and elected to bat.

16–19 March 2021
Scorecard

Warriors	v	Dolphins
124 (41.5 overs); Rudi Second 33 (72); Eathan Bosch 3/18 (13 overs)		358 (92.4 overs); Khaya Zondo 111 (156); Ayabulela Gqamane 2/46 (9.4 overs)
345 (111.2 overs); Edward Moore 115 (298); Keshav Maharaj 6/93		112/3 (34.3 overs); Senuran Muthusamy 57* (107); Ayabulela Gqamane 2/20 (7 overs)

Dolphins won by 7 wickets
St George's Park Cricket Ground, Port Elizabeth
Umpires: Brad White and Shaun George

- Dolphins won the toss and elected to field.

== Final ==
25–29 March 2021
Scorecard

Dolphins	v	Titans
295 (98.5 overs); Sarel Erwee 100 (192); Okuhle Cele 3/58 (21.5 overs)		53 (43.3 overs); Dean Elgar 16 (65); Prenelan Subrayen 6/24 (22 overs)
		166 (77.2 overs) (f/o); Rivaldo Moonsamy 41 (104); Senuran Muthusamy 6/79 (28.2 overs)

Dolphins won by an innings and 76 runs
Kingsmead Cricket Ground, Durban
Umpires: Brad White and Shaun George

- Dolphins won the toss and elected to bat.
- Only 10 overs were bowled on day 1 due to rain.
- No play was possible on day 2 due to rain.
