= 2015 Africa T20 Cup =

Africa T20 Cup
- Dates: 4 September – 4 October 2015
- Administrator: Cricket South Africa
- Cricket format: Twenty20
- Tournament format(s): Group stage, playoffs
- Host: South Africa
- Champions: Northerns (1st title)
- Runners-up: KwaZulu-Natal Inland
- Participants: 16
- Matches: 27
- Most runs: Vaughn van Jaarsveld (218)
- Most wickets: Ngazibini Sigwili (7); Niel Botha (7); Jandre Coetzee (7); Kyle Nipper (7)
- Official website: Official Website

The 2015 Africa T20 Cup was a Twenty20 cricket tournament held in South Africa from 4 September to 4 October 2015, as a curtain-raiser to the 2015–16 South African domestic season. Organized by Cricket South Africa, it featured thirteen South African provincial teams, as well as a Zimbabwean development XI and the national sides of Kenya and Namibia.

The sixteen participating teams were split into four pools of four, with the teams from each pool playing all of their matches at one ground across a single weekend. Benoni, Potchefstroom, Kimberley, and Bloemfontein hosted matches, as other venues were unavailable at that point in the season. Northerns defeated KwaZulu-Natal Inland in the final, which was held at Bloemfontein's Mangaung Oval. The tournament's leading runscorer was KZN Inland's Vaughn van Jaarsveld, while four players shared the leading wicket taker title.

== Pool A ==
=== Squads ===
(South Africa) Easterns Coach: Andre Nel	(South Africa) Northerns Coach: Mark Charlton	(South Africa) Western Province Coach: Faiek Davids	Zimbabwe XI Coach: Douglas Hondo
Ernest Kemm (c); Clayton August; Thando Bula (wk); Wesley Coulentianos; Junior Dala; Siphamandla Dapo; Quinton de Kock (wk); Johan Fourie; Ethy Mbhalati; Vincent Moore; Mangaliso Mosehle; Tabraiz Shamsi; Grant Thomson	Albie Morkel (c); Qaasim Adams; Corbin Bosch; Ruben Claassen; Theunis de Bruyn; Dean Elgar; Lerato Kgoatle; Heinrich Klaasen (wk); Aiden Markram; Rivaldo Moonsamy; Alfred Mothoa; Lungi Ngidi; Rowan Richards	Pieter Malan (c); Dayyaan Galiem; George Linde; Aviwe Mgijima; Travis Muller; Jack Newby; Lesiba Ngoepe; ~~Wayne Parnell~~; Dane Paterson; Omphile Ramela; Emmanuel Sebareme; Dane Vilas (wk); Lizaad Williams; Zubayr Hamza	Malcolm Waller (c); Keith Jaure; Luke Jongwe; Roy Kaia; Kevin Kasuza; Neville Madziva; Wellington Masakadza; Peter Moor; Tinotenda Mutombodzi; Richmond Mutumbami (wk); Taurai Muzarabani; Richard Ngarava; John Nyumbu; Kudzai Sauramba; Donald Tiripano

- Note: Wayne Parnell was originally named in Western Province's squad, but was forced to withdraw due to a hamstring injury. He was replaced by Lizaad Williams.

=== Points table ===
Team	Pld	W	L	T	NR	Pts	NRR
(South Africa) Northerns	3	2	0	0	1	10	+0.565
(South Africa) Easterns	3	1	1	0	1	6	+0.025
Zimbabwe XI	3	1	1	0	1	6	–0.034
(South Africa) Western Province	3	0	2	0	1	2	–0.577
Source: ESPNcricinfo

=== Fixtures ===
4 September
18:00
Scorecard

Western Province (South Africa); 105/9 (20 overs)	v	(South Africa) Easterns; 109/6 (19.1 overs)

Easterns won by 4 wickets
Willowmoore Park, Benoni

- Easterns won the toss and elected to field.
- Dayyaan Galiem and Jack Newby (both WP) made their Twenty20 debuts.

5 September
9:30
Scorecard

Western Province (South Africa)	v	(South Africa) Northerns

Match abandoned
Willowmoore Park, Benoni

5 September
13:00
Scorecard

Easterns (South Africa)	v	Zimbabwe XI

Match abandoned
Willowmoore Park, Benoni

5 September
16:30
Scorecard

Zimbabwe XI; 117/8 (20 overs)	v	(South Africa) Northerns; 118/4 (18 overs)

Northerns won by 6 wickets
Willowmoore Park, Benoni

- Northerns won the toss and elected to field.
- Ruben Claassen, Lungi Ngidi (both Northerns), Luke Jongwe, and Wellington Masakadza (both Zimbabwe) made their Twenty20 debuts.

6 September
10:00
Scorecard

Western Province (South Africa); 145/3 (20 overs)	v	Zimbabwe XI; 147/2 (18.2 overs)

Zimbabwe XI won by 8 wickets
Willowmoore Park, Benoni

- Zimbabwe XI won the toss and elected to field.
- Emmanuel Sebareme (WP) made his Twenty20 debut.

6 September
13:30
Scorecard

Easterns (South Africa); 126/4 (20 overs)	v	(South Africa) Northerns; 131/7 (19.3 overs)

Northerns won by 3 wickets
Willowmoore Park, Benoni

- Northerns won the toss and elected to field.

== Pool B ==
=== Squads ===
(South Africa) Boland Coach: Johann Louw	(South Africa) Border Coach: Frank Plaatjes	(South Africa) KZN Inland	(South Africa) North West
Dewald Botha (c); Ferisco Adams; Hashim Amla; Niel Botha; Gereldo George; Simon Khomari; Michael Loubser; Jean Marais (wk); Tshepo Moreki; ~~Justin Ontong~~; Robin Peterson; Zakhele Qwabe; Cebo Tshiki	Jerry Nqolo (c); Clayton Bosch; Darryl Brown; Phaphama Fojela; Clyde Fortuin; Ayabulela Gqamane; Christiaan Jonker; Jongile Kilani (wk); Gionne Koopman; Marco Marais; Lundi Mbane; Loyiso Mdasha; Somila Seyibokwe	Kyle Abbott; Craig Alexander; Sarel Erwee; Mbasa Gqadushe; Imraan Khan; Sohail Mahmoud; Kurtlyn Mannikam; Attie Maposa; Lefa Mosena; Kyle Nipper; Ruhan Pretorius; Vaughn van Jaarsveld; Khaya Zondo	Brady Barends; Niel Bredenkamp; Johannes Diseko; Bjorn Fortuin; Wihan Lubbe; Janneman Malan; Vusumuzi Mazibuko; Grant Mokoena; Aaron Phangiso; Dwaine Pretorius; Julian Soutter; Nicky van den Bergh; Rassie van der Dussen

Note: Justin Ontong was originally named in Boland's squad, but withdrew to focus on his recovery from knee surgery. His replacement is yet to be named.

=== Points table ===
Team	Pld	W	L	NR	BP	Pts	NRR
(South Africa) KZN Inland	3	3	0	0	2	14	+1.600
(South Africa) Boland	3	1	2	0	1	5	+0.627
(South Africa) North West	3	1	2	0	0	4	–0.730
(South Africa) Border	3	1	2	0	0	4	–1.475

=== Fixtures ===
11 September
18:00
Scorecard

KZN Inland (South Africa); 172/4 (20 overs)	v	(South Africa) North West; 137 (18.5 overs)

KZN Inland won by 35 runs
Senwes Park, Potchefstroom

- North West won the toss and elected to field.
- Janneman Malan (NW) made his Twenty20 debut.

12 September
9:30
Scorecard

KZN Inland (South Africa); 154/4 (20 overs)	v	(South Africa) Boland; 145/4 (20 overs)

KZN Inland won by 9 runs
Senwes Park, Potchefstroom

- Boland won the toss and elected to field.
- Niel Botha and Jean Marais (both Boland) made their Twenty20 debuts.

12 September
13:00
Scorecard

North West (South Africa); 104/8 (20 overs)	v	(South Africa) Border; 105/7 (18.5 overs)

Border won by 3 wickets
Senwes Park, Potchefstroom

- Border won the toss and elected to field.

12 September
16:30
Scorecard

Border (South Africa); 134/7 (20 overs)	v	(South Africa) Boland; 135/2 (14.2 overs)

Boland won by 8 wickets
Senwes Park, Potchefstroom

- Border won the toss and elected to bat.
- Gereldo George (Boland) made his Twenty20 debut.

13 September
10:00
Scorecard

KZN Inland (South Africa); 181/2 (20 overs)	v	(South Africa) Border; 129/8 (20 overs)

KZN Inland won by 52 runs
Senwes Park, Potchefstroom

- Border won the toss and elected to field.

13 September
13:30
Scorecard

Boland (South Africa); 167/4 (20 overs)	v	(South Africa) North West; 168/6 (20 overs)

North West won by 4 wickets
Senwes Park, Potchefstroom

- Boland won the toss and elected to bat.

== Pool C ==
=== Squads ===
(South Africa) Eastern Province Coach: Piet Botha	(South Africa) Griqualand West Coach: Jean-Pierre Triegaardt	(South Africa) KwaZulu-Natal Coach: Roger Telemachus	Namibia Coach: Dee Thakur
JJ Smuts (c); Tladi Bokako; Mathew Christensen; Gihahn Cloete (wk); Brad Dolley; Sisanda Magala; Edward Moore; Onke Nyaku; Ethan O'Reilly; James Price; Ngazibini Sigwili; Kelly Smuts; Basheeru-Deen Walters	Diego Rosier (c); Gerhardt Abrahams (wk); Warren Bell; Tumelo Bodibe (wk); Mbulelo Budaza; Werner Coetsee; Jandre Coetzee; Jan Frylinck; Reeza Hendricks; Patrick Kruger; Kagiso Mohale; Tebogo Mokwena; Aubrey Swanepoel	Cameron Delport (c); Khalipha Cele; Rabian Engelbrecht; Craig Kirsten; Keshav Maharaj; Sibonelo Makhanya; David Miller; Senuran Muthusamy; Jason Oakes (wk); Andile Phehlukwayo; Mishkal Ramsaroop; Brandon Scullard; Daniel Sincuba	Stephen Baard; Sarel Burger; Gerhard Erasmus; Zane Green; Zhivago Groenewald; JP Kotze; Bernard Scholtz; Nicolaas Scholtz; Christiaan Snyman; Gerrie Snyman; Johan Wessels; Craig Williams; Pikky Ya France

=== Points table ===
Team	Pld	W	L	NR	BP	Pts	NRR
(South Africa) KwaZulu-Natal	3	2	1	0	2	10	+1.293
(South Africa) Eastern Province	3	2	1	0	1	9	+0.174
(South Africa) Griqualand West	3	2	1	0	0	8	–0.895
Namibia	3	0	3	0	0	0	–1.724

=== Fixtures ===
18 September
18:00
Scorecard

Eastern Province (South Africa); 160/6 (20 overs)	v	(South Africa) Griqualand West; 129/7 (20 overs)

Eastern Province won by 31 runs
De Beers Diamond Oval, Kimberley

- Griqualand West won the toss and chose to field

19 September
9:30
Scorecard

KwaZulu-Natal (South Africa); 150/6 (20 overs)	v	(South Africa) Eastern Province; 114 (19.4 overs)

KwaZulu-Natal won by 36 runs
De Beers Diamond Oval, Kimberley

- KwaZulu-Natal won the toss and chose to bat

19 September
13:00
Scorecard

Namibia; 138 (20 overs)	v	(South Africa) Griqualand West; 140/2 (18.5 overs)

Griqualand West won by 8 wickets
De Beers Diamond Oval, Kimberley

- Namibia won the toss and chose to bat

19 September
16:30
Scorecard

KwaZulu-Natal (South Africa); 169/4 (20 overs)	v	Namibia; 99/8 (20 overs)

KwaZulu-Natal won by 70 runs
De Beers Diamond Oval, Kimberley

- KwaZulu-Natal won the toss and chose to bat

20 September
10:00
Scorecard

Namibia; 154/3 (20 overs)	v	(South Africa) Eastern Province; 114/0 (12.3 overs)

Eastern Province won by 31 runs (D/L)
De Beers Diamond Oval, Kimberley

- Namibia won the toss and chose to bat

20 September
13:30
Scorecard

Griqualand West (South Africa); 156/4 (18/18 overs)	v	(South Africa) KwaZulu-Natal; 125/8 (18/18 overs)

Griqualand West won by 31 runs
De Beers Diamond Oval, Kimberley

- Griqualand West won the toss and chose to bat

== Pool D ==
=== Squads ===
(South Africa) Free State Coach: Edward Mokoenanyana	(South Africa) Gauteng Coach: Enoch Nkwe	Kenya Coach: Steve Tikolo	(South Africa) SW Districts Coach: Deon Smith
Patrick Botha (c); Driaan Bruwer; Leus du Plooy; Dillon du Preez; Michael Erlank; Andries Gous (wk); Thabo Masheshemane; Bokang Mosena; Rilee Rossouw; Malusi Siboto; Romano Terblanche; Shadley van Schalkwyk; Lwandiswa Zuma	Matthew Arnold; Temba Bavuma; Devon Conway; Yassar Cook; Bradley Dial; Keith Dudgeon; Dominic Hendricks; Carmi le Roux; Sizwe Masondo; Nono Pongolo; Zaid Saloojee; Lonwabo Tsotsobe; Yaseen Valli	Rakep Patel (c); Emmanuel Bundi; Dhiren Gondaria; Narendra Kalyan; Irfan Karim (wk); Karan Kaul; Shem Ngoche; Alex Obanda; Collins Obuya; Nelson Odhiambo; Lucas Oluoch; Elijah Otieno; Rushab Patel	Waldo Lategan (c); Sybrand Engelbrecht; Hanno Kotze; Brendon Louw (wk); Christopher Marrow; Luthando Mnyanda; Vernon Philander; Marcello Piedt; Andrew Puttick; Lonwabo Rodolo; Mthokozisi Shezi; Siya Simetu; Pieter Stuurman

=== Points table ===
Team	Pld	W	L	NR	BP	Pts	NRR
(South Africa) Free State	3	3	0	0	2	14	+1.300
(South Africa) SW Districts	3	1	2	0	0	4	–0.215
(South Africa) Gauteng	3	1	2	0	0	4	–0.250
Kenya	3	1	2	0	0	4	–0.790

=== Fixtures ===
25 September
18:00
Scorecard

SW Districts (South Africa); 129/8 (20 overs)	v	(South Africa) Free State; 130/3 (15.1 overs)

Free State won by 7 wickets
Mangaung Oval, Bloemfontein

- Free State won the toss and elected to field.

26 September
9:30
Scorecard

SW Districts (South Africa); 111/6 (20 overs)	v	(South Africa) Gauteng; 92/9 (20 overs)

SW Districts won by 19 runs
Mangaung Oval, Bloemfontein

- SW Districts won the toss and elected to bat.

26 September
13:00
Scorecard

Kenya; 131/4 (20 overs)	v	(South Africa) Free State; 134/0 (15.5 overs)

Free State won by 10 wickets
Mangaung Oval, Bloemfontein

- Free State won the toss and elected to field.

26 September
16:30
Scorecard

Kenya; 154/5 (20 overs)	v	(South Africa) Gauteng; 158/6 (18.4 overs)

Gauteng won by 4 wickets
Mangaung Oval, Bloemfontein

- Kenya won the toss and elected to bat.

27 September
10:00
Scorecard

Kenya; 119 (18 overs)	v	(South Africa) SW Districts; 118/5 (20 overs)

Kenya won by 1 run
Mangaung Oval, Bloemfontein

- SW Districts won the toss and elected to field.

27 September
13:30
Scorecard

Free State (South Africa); 110/7 (20 overs)	v	(South Africa) Gauteng; 102/8 (20 overs)

Free State won by 8 runs
Mangaung Oval, Bloemfontein

- Gauteng won the toss and elected to field.

== Finals ==
=== Semi-finals ===
3 October
10:00
Scorecard

Northerns (South Africa); 180/4 (20 overs)	v	(South Africa) KwaZulu-Natal; 145/9 (20 overs)

Northerns won by 35 runs
Mangaung Oval, Bloemfontein

- KwaZulu-Natal won the toss and chose to bat

3 October
13:00
Scorecard

KZN Inland (South Africa); 139/5 (20 overs)	v	(South Africa) Free State; 135/7 (20 overs)

KZN Inland won by 4 runs
Mangaung Oval, Bloemfontein

- KZN Inland won the toss and chose to bat

=== Final ===
4 October
14:00
Scorecard

KZN Inland (South Africa); 103/8 (20 overs)	v	(South Africa) Northerns; 107/3 (18 overs)

Northerns won by 7 wickets
Mangaung Oval, Bloemfontein

- KZN Inland won the toss and elected to bat.

== Statistics ==
=== Most runs ===
The top five runscorers are included in this table, ranked by runs scored, then by batting average, then alphabetically by surname.

Player	Team	Runs	Inns	Avg	Highest	100s	50s
Vaughn van Jaarsveld	(South Africa) KZN Inland	218	5	72.66	93*	0	2
Cameron Delport	(South Africa) KwaZulu-Natal	157	4	39.25	72	0	1
Jean Marais	(South Africa) Boland	141	3	47.00	51	0	2
Andries Gous	(South Africa) Free State	137	4	45.66	78*	0	1
Sarel Erwee	(South Africa) KZN Inland	134	5	33.50	75*	0	1

Source: ESPNcricinfo

=== Most wickets ===
The top five wicket takers are listed in this table, ranked by wickets taken and then by bowling average.

Player	Team	Overs	Wkts	Ave	SR	Econ	BBI
Ngazibini Sigwili	(South Africa) Eastern Province	11.0	7	9.57	9.4	6.09	5/18
Niel Botha	(South Africa) Boland	12.0	7	11.57	10.2	6.75	3/32
Jandre Coetzee	(South Africa) Griqualand West	12.0	7	11.85	10.20	6.91	3/28
Kyle Nipper	(South Africa) KZN Inland	18.0	7	15.14	15.4	5.88	2/20
Senuran Muthusamy	(South Africa) KwaZulu-Natal	11.0	6	9.33	11.0	5.09	4/12

Source: ESPNcricinfo
