= 2017–18 Sunfoil Series =

Cricket tournament

- Dates: 19 September 2017 – 25 March 2018
- Administrator: Cricket South Africa
- Cricket format: First-class
- Tournament format: Double round-robin
- Champions: Titans (6th title)
- Participants: 6
- Matches: 30
- Most runs: Rassie van der Dussen (959)
- Most wickets: Simon Harmer (47)

The 2017–18 Sunfoil Series was a first-class cricket competition that took place in South Africa from 19 September 2017 to 25 March 2018. Knights were the defending champions.

There was a planned break in the competition between October and February for the first season of the T20 Global League (TGL). However, the TGL was postponed to November 2018, with South Africa's domestic T20 competition moved back from March 2018 to November 2017 to replace it.

After the first four rounds of fixtures, all twelve matches had ended in draws. The first win of the tournament came in the fifth round, when Titans beat Lions by nine wickets. By the end of the mid-season break in October 2017, fourteen of the fifteen matches had ended as a draw. Ahead of the final round of fixtures, five of the six teams were still in contention of winning the title.

Titans won the series, after they beat Knights by four wickets in the final round of matches.

== Points table ==
Teams	Pld	W	L	D	A	Pts	NRR
Titans	10	2	1	7	0	143.96	+0.407
Warriors	10	2	1	7	0	142.44	+0.037
Cape Cobras	10	1	1	8	0	133.36	–0.119
Knights	10	1	0	9	0	126.68	+0.087
Dolphins	10	1	1	8	0	126.66	+0.086
Lions	10	1	2	7	0	120.46	–0.495

== Fixtures ==
=== Round 1 ===
19–22 September 2017
Scorecard

Cape Cobras	v	Knights
159 (41 overs); Hashim Amla 56 (70); Shadley van Schalkwyk 5/30 (15 overs)		623/4d (150.2 overs); Theunis de Bruyn 195 (259); Justin Ontong 1/62 (16 overs)
567/6 (154 overs); Hashim Amla 189 (344); Shadley van Schalkwyk 3/95 (33 overs)

Match drawn
Mangaung Oval, Bloemfontein
Umpires: Clifford Isaacs and Brad White
Player of the match: Hashim Amla (Cape Cobras)

- Cape Cobras won the toss and elected to bat.
- In the Knights first innings, Keegan Petersen, Theunis de Bruyn, Rudi Second and Werner Coetsee all scored centuries. This was the first time in franchise cricket in South Africa that four players from one team had made a century in the same innings.
- Aviwe Mgijima (Cape Cobras) scored his maiden first-class century.

19–22 September 2017
Scorecard

Warriors	v	Lions
503/8d (137.4 overs); JJ Smuts 117 (149); Wiaan Mulder 4/70 (24 overs)		348 (91.4 overs); Wiaan Mulder 79 (150); Sisanda Magala 4/80 (19.4 overs)
199/4d (38.3 overs); JJ Smuts 58 (57); Omphile Ramela 1/4 (3 overs)		190/3 (62 overs); Omphile Ramela 67 (122); Anrich Nortje 3/45 (15 overs)

Match drawn
Wanderers Stadium, Johannesburg
Umpires: Stephen Harris and Dennis Smith
Player of the match: JJ Smuts (Warriors)

- Warriors won the toss and elected to bat.
- Omphile Ramela (Lions) played in his 100th first-class match.

19–22 September 2017
Scorecard

Titans	v	Dolphins
451/7d (115 overs); Aiden Markram 119 (177); Robert Frylinck 4/71 (22 overs)		317 (85 overs); Vaughn van Jaarsveld 53 (63); Malusi Siboto 5/51 (16 overs)
295/4d (51.3 overs); Dean Elgar 139 (164); Senuran Muthusamy 2/42 (8.3 overs)		311/7 (101.3 overs); Khaya Zondo 102* (210); Morné Morkel 3/44 (20 overs)

Match drawn
Centurion Park, Centurion
Umpires: Lubabalo Gcuma and Allahudien Paleker
Player of the match: Aiden Markram (Titan)

- Titans won the toss and elected to bat.

=== Round 2 ===
28 September–1 October 2017
Scorecard

Warriors	v	Cape Cobras
452/6d (141.2 overs); Jerry Nqolo 105* (172); Dane Piedt 3/86 (39 overs)		387/8d (115 overs); Pieter Malan 124 (237); JJ Smuts 4/38 (21 overs)
186/9d (55.2 overs); JJ Smuts 54 (76); Dane Paterson 3/31 (13 overs)		131/6 (58 overs); Zubayr Hamza 41 (64); JJ Smuts 4/39 (20.5 overs)

Match drawn
St George's Park Cricket Ground, Port Elizabeth
Umpires: Murray Brown and Adrian Holdstock
Player of the match: JJ Smuts (Warriors)

- Warriors won the toss and elected to bat.

28 September–1 October 2017
Scorecard

Dolphins	v	Knights
426/8d (97.2 overs); Sarel Erwee 151 (197); Keegan Petersen 3/49 (7 overs)		291 (87.5 overs); Pite van Biljon 105 (168); Senuran Muthusamy 4/64 (21.5 overs)
97/2 (33 overs); Vaughn van Jaarsveld 56* (91); Corné Dry 1/14 (6 overs)

Match drawn
Kingsmead Cricket Ground, Durban
Umpires: Allahudien Paleker and Brad White
Player of the match: Sarel Erwee (Dolphins)

- Knights won the toss and elected to field.
- No play was possible on day 1 due to rain.

28 September–1 October 2017
Scorecard

Titans	v	Lions
452/7d (131.2 overs); Henry Davids 137 (239); Beuran Hendricks 2/71 (24 overs)		408 (132.3 overs); Wiaan Mulder 127* (213); Migael Pretorius 3/78 (22 overs)
205/7d (67 overs); Farhaan Behardien 67* (117); Dwaine Pretorius 2/31 (14 overs)		80/2 (22 overs); Reeza Hendricks 30 (69); Shaun von Berg 2/37 (9 overs)

Match drawn
Centurion Park, Centurion
Umpires: Bongani Jele and Dennis Smith
Player of the match: Wiaan Mulder (Lions)

- Titans won the toss and elected to bat.
- Corbin Bosch (Titans) made his first-class debut.

=== Round 3 ===
6–9 October 2017
Scorecard

Knights	v	Cape Cobras
489/5d (114.3 overs); Rudi Second 203* (231); Michael Cohen 2/107 (23.3 overs)		447 (129.2 overs); Kyle Verreynne 85 (170); Ottniel Baartman 3/79 (20 overs)
3/0 (1.4 overs); Grant Mokoena 3* (8)

Match drawn
Recreation Ground, Oudtshoorn
Umpires: Shaun George and Arno Jacobs
Player of the match: Rudi Second (Knights)

- Knights won the toss and elected to bat.

6–9 October 2017
Scorecard

Lions	v	Dolphins
277d (104 overs); Rassie van der Dussen 75 (188); Mthokozisi Shezi 2/24 (17 overs)		185/6 (74.1 overs); Vaughn van Jaarsveld 52 (57); Aaron Phangiso 3/59 (25 overs)

Match drawn
Pietermaritzburg Oval, Pietermaritzburg
Umpires: Siphelele Gasa and Bongani Jele
Player of the match: Rassie van der Dussen (Dolphins)

- Lions won the toss and elected to bat.

6–9 October 2017
Scorecard

Titans	v	Warriors
321 (101.3 overs); Heinrich Klaasen 133 (215); Simon Harmer 4/99 (35 overs)		261 (91.3 overs); Yaseen Vallie 64 (86); Malusi Siboto 3/31 (17 overs)
220/6d (44 overs); Farhaan Behardien 59* (75); Simon Harmer 4/84 (19 overs)		141/7 (41.4 overs); Yaseen Vallie 55* (102); Migael Pretorius 3/30 (6.4 overs)

Match drawn
Willowmoore Park, Benoni
Umpires: Allahudien Paleker and Phillip Vosloo
Player of the match: Heinrich Klaasen (Titans)

- Titans won the toss and elected to bat.

=== Round 4 ===
16–19 October 2017
Scorecard

Warriors	v	Cape Cobras
347 (86.5 overs); Yaseen Vallie 150 (211); Michael Cohen 5/107 (21 overs)		530/8d (121.5 overs); Pieter Malan 195 (277); Basheeru-Deen Walters 3/112 (25 overs)
229/2 (67 overs); Colin Ackermann 106 (190); Mthiwekhaya Nabe 1/35 (10 overs)

Match drawn
Newlands Cricket Ground, Cape Town
Umpires: Ryan Hendricks and Allahudien Paleker
Player of the match: Pieter Malan (Cape Cobras)

- Cape Cobras won the toss and elected to field.
- Pieter Malan (Cape Cobras) scored his 25th century in first-class cricket.

16–19 October 2017
Scorecard

Titans	v	Dolphins
500/6d (134.2 overs); Dean Elgar 237* (370); Khaya Zondo 2/52 (9 overs)		216 (79.2 overs); Senuran Muthusamy 64 (188); Alfred Mothoa 3/30 (14 overs)
		427/4 (119 overs) (f/o); Cody Chetty 142* (257); Tabraiz Shamsi 2/158 (35 overs)

Match drawn
Pietermaritzburg Oval, Pietermaritzburg
Umpires: Abdoellah Steenkamp and Brad White
Player of the match: Dean Elgar (Titans)

- Titans won the toss and elected to bat.

16–19 October 2017
Scorecard

Lions	v	Knights
464 (137.5 overs); Rassie van der Dussen 114 (205); Eddie Leie 3/57 (12.5 overs)		261 (84.1 overs); Luthando Mnyanda 60 (114); Bjorn Fortuin 6/78 (26.1 overs)
198/2d (45 overs); Stephen Cook 105* (144); Ryan McLaren 1/41 (9 overs)		238/3 (81 overs); Luthando Mnyanda 69 (174); Bjorn Fortuin 1/46 (26 overs)

Match drawn
Senwes Park, Potchefstroom
Umpires: Thomas Mokorosi and Dennis Smith
Player of the match: Rassie van der Dussen (Lions)

- Lions won the toss and elected to bat.

=== Round 5 ===
23–26 October 2017
Scorecard

Dolphins	v	Cape Cobras
327 (98.1 overs); Dane Vilas 161 (200); Vernon Philander 4/25 (20 overs)		429 (133.1 overs); Zubayr Hamza 88 (142); Calvin Savage 4/74 (22 overs)
360/4 (90 overs); Morne van Wyk 106 (165); Dane Piedt 2/76 (23 overs)

Match drawn
Recreation Ground, Oudtshoorn
Umpires: Stephen Harris and Clifford Isaacs
Player of the match: Dane Vilas (Dolphins)

- Cape Cobras won the toss and elected to field.

23–26 October 2017
Scorecard

Warriors	v	Knights
362 (104.4 overs); Colin Ackermann 187* (303); Ryan McLaren 5/60 (20 overs)		391/5 (100 overs); Grant Mokoena 108 (169); Sisanda Magala 2/64 (18 overs)

Match drawn
De Beers Diamond Oval, Kimberley
Umpires: Murray Brown and Brad White
Player of the match: Colin Ackermann (Warriors)

- Warriors won the toss and elected to bat.
- No play was possible on day 2.

23–26 October 2017
Scorecard

Lions	v	Titans
180 (64 overs); Bjorn Fortuin 80 (152); Lungi Ngidi 6/37 (13 overs)		213 (67.5 overs); Aiden Markram 85 (168); Ayavuya Myoli 4/82 (19 overs)
165 (61.1 overs); Omphile Ramela 32 (84); Malusi Siboto 4/26 (12.1 overs)		133/1 (19 overs); Aiden Markram 81* (67); Hardus Viljoen 1/25 (7 overs)

Titans won by 9 wickets
Wanderers Stadium, Johannesburg
Umpires: Lubabalo Gcuma and Dennis Smith
Player of the match: Lungi Ngidi (Titans)

- Lions won the toss and elected to bat.

=== Round 6 ===
8–11 February 2018
Scorecard

Warriors	v	Lions
193 (61.5 overs); Colin Ackermann 55 (68); Aaron Phangiso 5/56 (20.5 overs)		178 (72.2 overs); Rassie van der Dussen 69 (146); JJ Smuts 3/31 (11.2 overs)
145 (42.3 overs); Yaseen Vallie 40 (84); Beuran Hendricks 6/31 (11.3 overs)		131 (48.4 overs); Rassie van der Dussen 40 (91); Tladi Bokako 4/15 (11 overs)

Warriors won by 29 runs
St George's Park Cricket Ground, Port Elizabeth
Umpires: Johan Cloete and Phillip Vosloo
Player of the match: Rassie van der Dussen (Lions)

- Warriors won the toss and elected to bat.

8–11 February 2018
Scorecard

Knights	v	Dolphins
478 (114.4 overs); Theunis de Bruyn 190 (225); Keshav Maharaj 5/128 (41.4 overs)		237 (68.4 overs); Senuran Muthusamy 95 (193); Marchant de Lange 5/57 (18.4 overs)
		426/4d (134 overs) (f/o); Sarel Erwee 128 (270); Shadley van Schalkwyk 2/47 (21 overs)

Match drawn
De Beers Diamond Oval, Kimberley
Umpires: Allahudien Paleker and Abdoellah Steenkamp
Player of the match: Theunis de Bruyn (Knights)

- Knights won the toss and elected to bat.

8–11 February 2018
Scorecard

Cape Cobras	v	Titans
428 (119 overs); Pieter Malan 137 (317); Eldred Hawken 3/60 (23 overs)		346 (109.4 overs); Rivaldo Moonsamy 76 (135); Dane Piedt 4/81 (28.4 overs)
185/6d (50.1 overs); Aviwe Mgijima 43 (51); Shaun von Berg 3/54 (16 overs)		57/2 (17.5 overs); Dean Elgar 27 (32); Dane Piedt 1/12 (4 overs)

Match drawn
Willowmoore Park, Benoni
Umpires: Arno Jacobs and Dennis Smith
Player of the match: Pieter Malan (Cape Cobras)

- Cape Cobras won the toss and elected to bat.

=== Round 7 ===
15–18 February 2018
Scorecard

Cape Cobras	v	Lions
574/8d (143.1 overs); Stiaan van Zyl 228 (287); Omphile Ramela 2/50 (14 overs)		562 (178.3 overs); Stephen Cook 194 (330); Simon Khomari 2/66 (20 overs)
117/4 (33 overs); Zubayr Hamza 54* (67); Wiaan Mulder 4/25 (7 overs)

Match drawn
Boland Park, Paarl
Umpires: Ryan Hendricks and Dennis Smith
Player of the match: Stiaan van Zyl (Cape Cobras)

- Cape Cobras won the toss and elected to bat.

15–18 February 2018
Scorecard

Dolphins	v	Warriors
145 (57.2 overs); Senuran Muthusamy 41 (114); Simon Harmer 6/47 (22.2 overs)		204 (65.5 overs); Lesiba Ngoepe 45 (79); Kerwin Mungroo 5/45 (12.5 overs)
344 (97.2 overs); Vaughn van Jaarsveld 110 (180); Simon Harmer 6/101 (35.2 overs)		230 (78.5 overs); Colin Ackermann 63 (90); Keshav Maharaj 7/76 (34 overs)

Dolphins won by 55 runs
Buffalo Park, East London
Umpires: Johan Cloete and Thomas Mokorosi
Player of the match: Keshav Maharaj (Dolphins)

- Dolphins won the toss and elected to bat.

15–18 February 2018
Scorecard

Knights	v	Titans
363 (108 overs); Grant Mokoena 154* (309); Rowan Richards 4/64 (21 overs)		345 (126.1 overs); Henry Davids 95* (172); Duanne Olivier 4/78 (33 overs)
256/3 (106 overs); Keegan Petersen 85* (306); Shaun von Berg 3/95 (49 overs)

Match drawn
Mangaung Oval, Bloemfontein
Umpires: Murray Brown and Clifford Isaacs
Player of the match: Grant Mokoena (Knights)

- Knights won the toss and elected to bat.

=== Round 8 ===
22–25 February 2018
Scorecard

Warriors	v	Titans
282 (97 overs); Gihahn Cloete 83 (137); Chris Morris 4/42 (21 overs)		213 (85.3 overs); Farhaan Behardien 97 (200); Simon Harmer 5/74 (31 overs)
256/5d (66 overs); Colin Ackermann 125* (157); Tabraiz Shamsi 5/90 (23 overs)		248 (89 overs); Chris Morris 113 (184); Tladi Bokako 4/43 (16 overs)

Warriors won by 77 runs
Buffalo Park, East London
Umpires: Bongani Jele and Dennis Smith
Player of the match: Colin Ackermann (Warriors)

- Titans won the toss and elected to field.

22–25 February 2018
Scorecard

Dolphins	v	Cape Cobras
285 (70 overs); Dane Vilas 70 (76); Dane Paterson 4/58 (19 overs)		350 (100.5 overs); Aviwe Mgijima 107* (172); Rabian Engelbrecht 5/77 (18.5 overs)
291 (80.5 overs); Vaughn van Jaarsveld 57 (89); Junaid Dawood 3/74 (22 overs)		227/2 (65.1 overs); Zubayr Hamza 109* (182); Prenelan Subrayen 1/31 (19 overs)

Cape Cobras won by 8 wickets
Pietermaritzburg Oval, Pietermaritzburg
Umpires: Johan Cloete and Siphelele Gasa
Player of the match: Zubayr Hamza (Cape Cobras)

- Dolphins won the toss and elected to bat.

22–25 February 2018
Scorecard

Lions	v	Knights
217 (79.4 overs); Dwaine Pretorius 76 (133); Mbulelo Budaza 3/40 (11.4 overs)		500/8d (129.2 overs); David Miller 103 (148); Nono Pongolo 5/105 (23.2 overs)
194/4 (69 overs); Rassie van der Dussen 64* (116); Marchant de Lange 2/36 (12 overs)

Match drawn
De Beers Diamond Oval, Kimberley
Umpires: Stephen Harris and Brad White
Player of the match: David Miller (Knights)

- Knights won the toss and elected to field.

=== Round 9 ===
15–18 March 2018
Scorecard

Titans	v	Cape Cobras
435/9d (139 overs); Farhaan Behardien 129 (207); Dane Paterson 3/100 (29 overs)		460 (174.3 overs); Pieter Malan 180 (466); Eldred Hawken 4/82 (38 overs)
133/3 (31 overs); Andrea Agathangelou 77* (83); Junaid Dawood 2/32 (5 overs)

Match drawn
Newlands Cricket Ground, Cape Town
Umpires: Nitin Menon and Murray Brown
Player of the match: Pieter Malan (Cape Cobras)

- Titans won the toss and elected to bat.

15–18 March 2018
Scorecard

Knights	v	Warriors
188 (59.4 overs); Ryan McLaren 73 (98); Simon Harmer 5/36 (19.4 overs)		181 (56 overs); Gihahn Cloete 64 (104); Ottniel Baartman 4/46 (17 overs)
248/8d (58.4 overs); Patrick Kruger 87 (107); Anrich Nortje 4/57 (18 overs)		248/8 (64 overs); Edward Moore 73 (101); Werner Coetsee 6/71 (24 overs)

Match drawn
Buffalo Park, East London
Umpires: Brad White and Shawn Craig
Player of the match: Simon Harmer (Warriors)

- Warriors won the toss and elected to field.

15–18 March 2018
Scorecard

Lions	v	Dolphins
246 (91.1 overs); Omphile Ramela 60 (171); Okuhle Cele 3/19 (11.1 overs)		379 (86.3 overs); Dane Vilas 128 (152); Beuran Hendricks 5/86 (18.3 overs)
417/7d (123 overs); Reeza Hendricks 112 (182); Okuhle Cele 2/67 (17 overs)		199/7 (35.3 overs); Vaughn van Jaarsveld 59 (53); Wiaan Mulder 2/33 (6 overs)

Match drawn
Senwes Park, Potchefstroom
Umpires: Johan Cloete and John Bromley
Player of the match: Dane Vilas (Dolphins)

- Lions won the toss and elected to bat.

=== Round 10 ===
22–25 March 2018
Scorecard

Warriors	v	Dolphins
320/9d (88.5 overs); Gihahn Cloete 105 (124); Senuran Muthusamy 7/83 (35 overs)		211 (44.5 overs); Senuran Muthusamy 84* (105); Yaseen Vallie 2/29 (5.5 overs)

Match drawn
Pietermaritzburg Oval, Pietermaritzburg
Umpires: Murray Brown and Nitin Menon
Player of the match: Senuran Muthusamy (Dolphins)

- Dolphins won the toss and elected to field.
- No play was possible on days 1 and 2 due to rain.

22–25 March 2018
Scorecard

Cape Cobras	v	Lions
217 (55.3 overs); Zubayr Hamza 57 (86); Bjorn Fortuin 3/43 (12.3 overs)		325 (105 overs); Rassie van der Dussen 122 (234); Lizaad Williams 5/70 (22 overs)
364/3d (98 overs); Zubayr Hamza 121 (182); Dwaine Pretorius 1/32 (9 overs)		258/1 (40 overs); Reeza Hendricks 119* (124); Lizaad Williams 1/72 (13 overs)

Lions won by 9 wickets
Wanderers Stadium, Johannesburg
Umpires: Shawn Craig and Dennis Smith
Player of the match: Zubayr Hamza (Cape Cobras)

- Lions won the toss and elected to field.
- No play was possible on day 1 due to rain.

22–25 March 2018
Scorecard

Knights	v	Titans
169/7d (40 overs); Luthando Mnyanda 53 (94); Alfred Mothoa 3/34 (8 overs)		269/3d (40 overs); Heino Kuhn 86 (82); Patrick Kruger 1/22 (2 overs)
209 (62.4 overs); Rudi Second 76 (136); Chris Morris 6/55 (17 overs)		112/6 (19.3 overs); Heino Kuhn 43 (51); Marchant de Lange 3/40 (6.3 overs)

Titans won by 4 wickets
Willowmoore Park, Benoni
Umpires: John Bromley and Bongani Jele
Player of the match: Chris Morris (Titans)

- Titans won the toss and elected to field.
- No play was possible on days 1 and 2 due to rain.
