= 2017–18 Momentum One Day Cup =

Cricket tournament

- Dates: 20 December 2017 – 3 February 2018
- Administrator(s): Cricket South Africa
- Cricket format: List A
- Tournament format(s): Double round-robin and playoffs
- Champions: Dolphins; Warriors
- Participants: 6
- Most runs: Pieter Malan (615)
- Most wickets: Tabraiz Shamsi (26)

The 2017–18 Momentum One Day Cup was a domestic one-day cricket championship that was held in South Africa. It was the 37th time that the championship was contested. The competition started on 20 December 2017 and concluded with the final on 3 February 2018. Titans were the defending champions.

On 17 January 2018, JP Duminy set a new South African record for the most runs scored in a single over in a List A match, when he made 37 runs off the bowling of Eddie Leie. During the last round of group stage fixtures, Reeza Hendricks became the first player to score a century in all three franchise competitions in South Africa in the same season. He previously scored a first-class century in October 2017 in the Sunfoil Series and a Twenty20 century in the Ram Slam Challenge in November 2017.

Following the group stage, Titans and Warriors advanced to the first semi-final with Cape Cobras and Dolphins advancing to the second semi-final. In the first semi-final, Warriors beat Titans, the defending champions, by eight wickets to progress to the final. In the second semi-final, Dolphins beat Cape Cobras by 49 runs to advance. In the final, the match was abandoned as no result, after heavy rain and lightning, with the match rescheduled to played again the following day. No play was possible on the reserve day, so the title was shared between Dolphins and Warriors.

== Points table ==
Pos	Team	Pld	W	L	T	NR	BP	Pts	NRR
1	Titans	10	7	3	0	0	5	33	1.019
2	Cape Cobras	10	7	3	0	0	3	31	0.334
3	Dolphins	10	6	3	1	0	2	29	0.338
4	Warriors	10	4	6	0	0	1	17	−0.388
5	Lions	10	3	6	1	0	1	16	−0.183
6	Knights	10	1	7	2	0	1	11	−1.125

Teams qualified for the finals

== Fixtures ==
=== Round-robin ===
20 December 2017
Scorecard

Lions; 209/9 (39.4 overs)	v	Warriors; 210/4 (37 overs)
Dwaine Pretorius 77* (62); Sisanda Magala 3/28 (8 overs)		JJ Smuts 70* (70); Hardus Viljoen 3/57 (8 overs)

Warriors won by 6 wickets
New Wanderers Stadium, Johannesburg
Umpires: Adrian Holdstock and Bongani Jele
Player of the match: Sisanda Magala (Warriors)

- Warriors won the toss and elected to field.
- JJ Smuts and Christiaan Jonker (Warriors) scored an unbeaten 131 runs, the highest partnership for the fifth wicket in franchise cricket in South Africa.

21 December 2017
Scorecard

Dolphins; 315/7 (50 overs)	v	Cape Cobras; 289 (49.2 overs)
Vaughn van Jaarsveld 89 (82); Mthiwekhaya Nabe 3/59 (8 overs)		Richard Levi 68 (72); Mthokozisi Shezi 4/67 (9.2 overs)

Dolphins won by 26 runs
Kingsmead Cricket Ground, Durban
Umpires: Stephen Harris and Arno Jacobs
Player of the match: Dane Vilas (Dolphins)

- Dolphins won the toss and elected to bat.

22 December 2017
Scorecard

Knights; 212 (42.4 overs)	v	Titans; 216/3 (29 overs)
David Miller 62* (70); Alfred Mothoa 2/22 (4 overs)		Heinrich Klaasen 91* (59); Mbulelo Budaza 2/34 (5 overs)

Titans won by 7 wickets
Diamond Oval, Kimberley
Umpires: Shaun George and Brad White
Player of the match: Heinrich Klaasen (Titans)

- Titans won the toss and elected to field.

23 December 2017
Scorecard

Cape Cobras; 242/9 (50 overs)	v	Warriors; 175 (36.1 overs)
Pieter Malan 84 (116); Ayabulela Gqamane 3/29 (7 overs)		Christiaan Jonker 63 (39); George Linde 6/47 (9.1 overs)

Cape Cobras won by 67 runs
St George's Park, Port Elizabeth
Umpires: Siphelele Gasa and Allahudien Paleker
Player of the match: George Linde (Cape Cobras)

- Warriors won the toss and elected to field.

23 December 2017
Scorecard

Dolphins; 253 (48.5 overs)	v	Lions; 254/8 (50 overs)
Robert Frylinck 45 (31); Hardus Viljoen 3/43 (9 overs)		Omphile Ramela 57 (83); Sibonelo Makhanya 3/36 (8 overs)

Lions won by 2 wickets
Senwes Park, Potchefstroom
Umpires: Ryan Hendricks and Adrian Holdstock
Player of the match: Hardus Viljoen (Lions)

- Dolphins won the toss and elected to bat.

3 January 2018
Scorecard

Titans; 264 (47.3 overs)	v	Lions; 232 (48.5 overs)
Albie Morkel 81 (82); Beuran Hendricks 5/49 (9 overs)		Rassie van der Dussen 49 (64); Malusi Siboto 3/30 (8.5 overs)

Titans won by 32 runs
New Wanderers Stadium, Johannesburg
Umpires: Johan Cloete and Lubabalo Gcuma
Player of the match: Albie Morkel (Titans)

- Titans won the toss and elected to bat.

5 January 2018
Scorecard

Knights; 272/8 (50 overs)	v	Lions; 272/9 (50 overs)
David Miller 57 (61); Hardus Viljoen 2/43 (10 overs)		Rassie van der Dussen 67 (84); Duanne Olivier 4/34 (10 overs)

Match tied
Diamond Oval, Kimberley
Umpires: Adrian Holdstock and Phillip Vosloo
Player of the match: Hardus Viljoen (Lions)

- Knights won the toss and elected to bat.

5 January 2018
Scorecard

Titans; 212/9 (50 overs)	v	Cape Cobras; 213/6 (38.2 overs)
Farhaan Behardien 59 (75); Dane Paterson 3/38 (10 overs)		Aviwe Mgijima 54 (58); Tabraiz Shamsi 3/55 (10 overs)

Cape Cobras won by 4 wickets
Centurion Park, Centurion
Player of the match: Dane Paterson (Cape Cobras)

- Cape Cobras won the toss and elected to field.

5 January 2018
Scorecard

Dolphins; 250/9 (50 overs)	v	Warriors; 171 (38.3 overs)
Cody Chetty 53* (69); JJ Smuts 4/55 (10 overs)		JJ Smuts 45 (51); Imran Tahir 5/21 (8.3 overs)

Dolphins won by 79 runs
St George's Park, Port Elizabeth
Umpires: Murray Brown and Dennis Smith
Player of the match: Imran Tahir (Dolphins)

- Dolphins won the toss and elected to bat.

7 January 2018
Scorecard

Lions; 237 (49.4 overs)	v	Cape Cobras; 241/3 (47.1 overs)
Rassie van der Dussen 65 (71); Dane Paterson 3/41 (10 overs)		Pieter Malan 89 (111); Beuran Hendricks 2/40 (10 overs)

Cape Cobras won by 7 wickets
New Wanderers Stadium, Johannesburg
Umpires: Johan Cloete and Arno Jacobs
Player of the match: Pieter Malan (Cape Cobras)

- Lions won the toss and elected to bat.

7 January 2018
Scorecard

Titans; 312/7 (50 overs)	v	Warriors; 208 (38.4 overs)
Andrea Agathangelou 113 (124); Sisanda Magala 3/65 (10 overs)		Gihahn Cloete 82 (74); Tabraiz Shamsi 3/54 (9.4 overs)

Titans won by 104 runs
Willowmoore Park, Benoni
Umpires: Thomas Mokorosi and Brad White
Player of the match: Rivaldo Moonsamy (Titans)

- Titans won the toss and elected to bat.
- Andrea Agathangelou and Rivaldo Moonsamy (Titans) both scored their maiden centuries in List A cricket.

9 January 2018
Scorecard

Warriors; 335/9 (50 overs)	v	Knights; 275 (49.1 overs)
Gihahn Cloete 143 (128); Duanne Olivier 4/65 (10 overs)		Keegan Petersen 53 (58); Anrich Nortje 2/49 (8.1 overs)

Warriors won by 60 runs
Diamond Oval, Kimberley
Umpires: Ryan Hendricks and Adrian Holdstock
Player of the match: Gihahn Cloete (Warriors)

- Warriors won the toss and elected to bat.

10 January 2018
Scorecard

Cape Cobras; 289/6 (50 overs)	v	Dolphins; 291/7 (50 overs)
JP Duminy 86 (66); Robbie Frylinck 3/44 (10 overs)		Morne van Wyk 107 (137); Wayne Parnell 2/45 (10 overs)

Dolphins won by 3 wickets
Boland Park, Paarl
Umpires: Allahudien Paleker and Dennis Smith
Player of the match: Morne van Wyk (Dolphins)

- Cape Cobras won the toss and elected to bat.

11 January 2018
Scorecard

Warriors; 306/6 (50 overs)	v	Lions; 309/6 (49.4 overs)
Yaseen Vallie 81 (102); Hardus Viljoen 2/67 (10 overs)		Reeza Hendricks 80 (74); Sithembile Langa 3/50 (7 overs)

Lions won by 4 wickets
Buffalo Park, East London
Umpires: Lubabalo Gcuma and Stephen Harris
Player of the match: Rassie van der Dussen (Lions)

- Warriors won the toss and elected to bat.

12 January 2018
Scorecard

Titans; 270/7 (50 overs)	v	Cape Cobras; 271/9 (49.3 overs)
Heinrich Klaasen 86 (96); Dane Paterson 3/51 (10 overs)		Pieter Malan 62 (68); Tabraiz Shamsi 3/66 (10 overs)

Cape Cobras won by 1 wicket
Newlands Cricket Ground, Cape Town
Umpires: Bongani Jele and Brad White
Player of the match: Heinrich Klaasen (Titans)

- Titans won the toss and elected to bat.

12 January 2018
Scorecard

Knights; 193 (41.5 overs)	v	Dolphins; 195/3 (36.3 overs)
David Miller 79 (71); Attie Maposa 4/46 (10 overs)		Sarel Erwee 84 (109); Ryan McLaren 2/29 (7 overs)

Dolphins won by 7 wickets
Kingsmead Cricket Ground, Durban
Umpires: Adrian Holdstock and Phillip Vosloo
Player of the match: Sarel Erwee (Dolphins)

- Knights won the toss and elected to bat.

14 January 2018
Scorecard

Titans; 250/9 (50 overs)	v	Warriors; 129 (34.2 overs)
Albie Morkel 80* (63); Sisanda Magala 4/46 (9 overs)		Yaseen Vallie 40 (49); Tabraiz Shamsi 3/11 (6 overs)

Titans won by 121 runs
Buffalo Park, East London
Umpires: Lubabalo Gcuma and Stephen Harris
Player of the match: Albie Morkel (Titans)

- Titans won the toss and elected to bat.

14 January 2018
Scorecard

Knights; 233/9 (50 overs)	v	Dolphins; 233/9 (50 overs)
Rudi Second 66 (89); Andile Phehlukwayo 3/49 (9 overs)		Senuran Muthusamy 68 (89); Duanne Olivier 3/52 (10 overs)

Match tied
Mangaung Oval, Bloemfontein
Umpires: Arno Jacobs and Bongani Jele
Player of the match: Senuran Muthusamy (Dolphins)

- Knights won the toss and elected to bat.

17 January 2018
Scorecard

Knights; 239/9 (50 overs)	v	Cape Cobras; 245/2 (37 overs)
Patrick Kruger 110* (110); Rory Kleinveldt 2/22 (8 overs)		JP Duminy 70* (37); Marchant de Lange 1/35 (8 overs)

Cape Cobras won by 8 wickets
Newlands Cricket Ground, Cape Town
Umpires: Siphelele Gasa and Adrian Holdstock
Player of the match: Patrick Kruger (Knights)

- Knights won the toss and elected to bat.
- Patrick Kruger (Knights) scored his first century in List A cricket.
- JP Duminy scored the most runs off one over in a List A match in South Africa (37).

17 January 2018
Scorecard

Lions; 176 (43.2 overs)	v	Titans; 177/5 (38.2 overs)
Stephen Cook 89 (120); Tabraiz Shamsi 5/40 (10 overs)		Rivaldo Moonsamy 57 (99); Hardus Viljoen 2/53 (10 overs)

Titans won by 5 wickets
Willowmoore Park, Benoni
Umpires: Johan Cloete and Arno Jacobs
Player of the match: Tabraiz Shamsi (Titans)

- Titans won the toss and elected to field.

19 January 2018
Scorecard

Cape Cobras; 273/6 (50 overs)	v	Lions; 246 (48.2 overs)
Pieter Malan 124 (132); Aaron Phangiso 2/52 (9 overs)		Dominic Hendricks 77 (98); Rory Kleinveldt 3/48 (9.2 overs)

Cape Cobras won by 27 runs
Boland Park, Paarl
Umpires: Siphelele Gasa and Adrian Holdstock
Player of the match: Pieter Malan (Cape Cobras)

- Lions won the toss and elected to field.

19 January 2018
Scorecard

Dolphins; 207 (48 overs)	v	Warriors; 208/3 (45 overs)
Dane Vilas 82 (90); Colin Ackermann 4/48 (10 overs)		Yaseen Vallie 79* (102); Imran Tahir 2/46 (10 overs)

Warriors won by 7 wickets
Kingsmead Cricket Ground, Durban
Umpires: Clifford Isaacs and Brad White
Player of the match: Colin Ackermann (Warriors)

- Dolphins won the toss and elected to bat.

19 January 2018
Scorecard

Titans; 309/8 (50 overs)	v	Knights; 214 (40.1 overs)
Tony de Zorzi 103 (128); Mbulelo Budaza 2/48 (9 overs)		Grant Mokoena 62 (77); Tabraiz Shamsi 2/39 (10 overs)

Titans won by 95 runs
Diamond Oval, Kimberley
Umpires: Bongani Jele and Phillip Vosloo
Player of the match: Tony de Zorzi (Titans)

- Knights won the toss and elected to field.
- Tony de Zorzi (Titans) scored his first century in List A cricket.

21 January 2018
Scorecard

Titans; 242/8 (50 overs)	v	Dolphins; 213 (47.4 overs)
Farhaan Behardien 88 (80); Mthokozisi Shezi 2/39 (9 overs)		Sarel Erwee 76 (101); Albie Morkel 2/30 (6 overs)

Titans won by 29 runs
City Oval, Pietermaritzburg
Umpires: Dennis Smith and Brad White
Player of the match: Farhaan Behardien (Titans)

- Dolphins won the toss and elected to field.

21 January 2018
Scorecard

Knights; 320/4 (50 overs)	v	Cape Cobras; 245 (41.4 overs)
Rudi Second 78* (58); JP Duminy 2/44 (10 overs)		Kyle Verreynne 54 (49); Eddie Leie 4/65 (9.4 overs)

Knights won by 75 runs
Mangaung Oval, Bloemfontein
Umpires: Ryan Hendricks and Bongani Jele
Player of the match: Rudi Second (Knights)

- Cape Cobras won the toss and elected to field.

24 January 2018
Scorecard

Lions; 194 (46.1 overs)	v	Dolphins; 195/3 (44 overs)
Reeza Hendricks 47 (63); Senuran Muthusamy 3/30 (8.1 overs)		Morne van Wyk 83* (134); Wiaan Mulder 1/15 (8 overs)

Dolphins won by 7 wickets
Kingsmead Cricket Ground, Durban
Umpires: Stephen Harris and Allahudien Paleker
Player of the match: Morne van Wyk (Dolphins)

- Lions won the toss and elected to bat.

24 January 2018
Scorecard

Knights; 216 (49.5 overs)	v	Warriors; 219/8 (40.4 overs)
Andries Gous 70 (110); JJ Smuts 3/31 (10 overs)		Gihahn Cloete 45 (45); Ottniel Baartman 3/50 (10 overs)

Warriors won by 2 wickets
Buffalo Park, East London
Umpires: Johan Cloete and Thomas Mokorosi
Player of the match: JJ Smuts (Warriors)

- Knights won the toss and elected to bat.

26 January 2018
Scorecard

Warriors; 264/7 (50 overs)	v	Cape Cobras; 249/7 (46.5 overs)
Gihahn Cloete 120* (138); Dane Paterson 2/46 (10 overs)		Pieter Malan 94* (131); JJ Smuts 3/46 (10 overs)

Cape Cobras won by 10 runs (D/L method)
Recreation Ground, Oudtshoorn
Umpires: Murray Brown and Siphelele Gasa
Player of the match: Pieter Malan (Cape Cobras)

- Warriors won the toss and elected to bat.

26 January 2018
Scorecard

Lions; 299/8 (50 overs)	v	Knights; 161 (36.3 overs)
Reeza Hendricks 105 (121); Romano Terblanche 2/49 (10 overs)		Pite van Biljon 42 (52); Bjorn Fortuin 4/22 (9 overs)

Lions won by 138 runs
Senwes Park, Potchefstroom
Umpires: Lubabalo Gcuma and Bongani Jele
Player of the match: Reeza Hendricks (Lions)

- Lions won the toss and elected to bat.

26 January 2018
Scorecard

Titans; 269/6 (48.2 overs)	v	Dolphins; 253/6 (38.1 overs)
Tony de Zorzi 68 (82); Senuran Muthusamy 3/59 (10 overs)		Dane Vilas 103 (117); Shaun von Berg 3/47 (8 overs)

Dolphins won by 4 wickets (D/L method)
Centurion Park, Centurion
Umpires: Johan Cloete and Abdoellah Steenkamp
Player of the match: Dane Vilas (Dolphins)

- Dolphins won the toss and elected to field.

=== Finals ===
1st semi-final
30 January 2018
Scorecard

Titans; 230 (49.4 overs)	v	Warriors; 231/2 (34.5 overs)
Farhaan Behardien 57 (67); Anrich Nortje 3/45 (9.4 overs)		JJ Smuts 74* (60); Malusi Siboto 1/30 (4 overs)

Warriors won by 8 wickets
Centurion Park, Centurion
Umpires: Allahudien Paleker and Brad White
Player of the match: JJ Smuts (Warriors)

- Warriors won the toss and elected to field.

2nd semi-final
31 January 2018
Scorecard

Dolphins; 230 (50 overs)	v	Cape Cobras; 181 (46.3 overs)
Sarel Erwee 93 (135); Mthiwekhaya Nabe 3/39 (9 overs)		Dane Piedt 54 (73); Robbie Frylinck 3/21 (9 overs)

Dolphins won by 49 runs
Newlands Cricket Ground, Cape Town
Umpires: Johan Cloete and Stephen Harris
Player of the match: Sarel Erwee (Dolphins)

- Cape Cobras won the toss and elected to field.

Final
2 February 2018
Scorecard

Dolphins; 154/6 (39.4 overs)	v	Warriors
Senuran Muthusamy 53* (90); Andrew Birch 2/29 (7 overs)

No result
Kingsmead Cricket Ground, Durban
Umpires: Bongani Jele and Allahudien Paleker

- Warriors won the toss and elected to field.
- Rain and lightning prevented any further play, with the match rescheduled to played again the following day.

Final
3 February 2018
Scorecard

Dolphins	v	Warriors

Match abandoned
Kingsmead Cricket Ground, Durban

- No toss.
- No play was possible due to rain.
- Dolphins and Warriors shared the title with no play possible on the reserve day.
