= Bredenkamp =

Bredenkamp is a German and Afrikaans surname. Notable people with the surname include:

- Jean Bredenkamp (born 1993), South African cricketer
- John Bredenkamp (1940–2020), Zimbabwean businessman and former rugby union footballer
- Mike Bredenkamp (1873–1940), South African rugby union player
- Niel Bredenkamp (born 1987), South African cricketer
