= Piet Botha =

Piet Botha may refer to:

- Piet Botha (cricketer)
- Piet Botha (musician)
- Piet Botha (professor)
- Piet Botha (rugby union)
