= 2019–20 Momentum One Day Cup =

Cricket tournament

- Dates: 31 January – 21 March 2020
- Administrator: Cricket South Africa
- Cricket format: List A
- Tournament format(s): Double round-robin and playoffs
- Champions: Dolphins (2nd title)
- Participants: 6
- Matches: 33
- Most runs: Grant Roelofsen (588)
- Most wickets: Mbulelo Budaza (18); Shaun von Berg (18)

The 2019–20 Momentum One Day Cup was a domestic one-day cricket tournament that took place in South Africa. It was the 39th edition of the championship, with the tournament originally scheduled to run from 31 January to 21 March 2020. Titans were the defending champions.

Following the conclusion of the group stage, Dolphins, Lions, Warriors and Knights had qualified for the semi-finals. However, on 16 March 2020, Cricket South Africa suspended all cricket in the country for 60 days due to the COVID-19 pandemic. On 24 March 2020, Dolphins were named as the winners of the tournament, following the recommendations of Graeme Smith, the acting Director of Cricket.

== Points table ==
Pos	Team	Pld	W	L	NR	BP	Pts	NRR
1	Dolphins	10	7	3	0	2	30	0.698
2	Lions	10	6	3	1	2	28	0.369
3	Warriors	10	5	4	1	2	24	0.132
4	Knights	10	4	4	2	2	22	−0.367
5	Titans	10	4	6	0	2	18	−0.087
6	Cape Cobras	10	2	8	0	0	8	−0.884

Teams qualified for the finals

== Fixtures ==
=== Round-robin ===
31 January 2020
Scorecard

Lions; 305 (49.4 overs)	v	Titans; 232 (44.5 overs)
Ryan Rickelton 92 (89); Lungi Ngidi 3/40 (9 overs)		Henry Davids 49 (80); Beuran Hendricks 4/43 (8.5 overs)

Lions won by 73 runs
Centurion Park, Centurion
Umpires: Siphelele Gasa and Stephen Harris
Player of the match: Ryan Rickelton (Lions)

- Titans won the toss and elected to field.

2 February 2020
Scorecard

Dolphins; 209/9 (50 overs)	v	Knights; 115 (34.2 overs)
Prenelan Subrayen 46* (52); Shaun von Berg 2/31 (10 overs)		Wandile Makwetu 29 (47); Imran Tahir 4/33 (10 overs)

Dolphins won by 94 runs
Kingsmead, Durban
Umpires: Lubabalo Gcuma and Brad White
Player of the match: Keshav Maharaj (Dolphins)

- Dolphins won the toss and elected to bat.

3 February 2020
Scorecard

Cape Cobras; 274/6 (49 overs)	v	Warriors; 245 (47.1 overs)
Pieter Malan 106 (114); Dyllan Matthews 2/55 (9 overs)		Rudi Second 66 (65); Thando Ntini 4/36 (9.1 overs)

Cape Cobras won by 31 runs (DLS method)
Recreation Ground, Oudtshoorn
Umpires: Arno Jacobs and Abdoellah Steenkamp
Player of the match: Pieter Malan (Cape Cobras)

- Cape Cobras won the toss and elected to bat.

7 February 2020
Scorecard

Lions; 320/7 (50 overs)	v	Cape Cobras; 271/6 (50 overs)
Ryan Rickelton 157 (135); Rory Kleinveldt 2/42 (10 overs)		Zubayr Hamza 58 (57); Eldred Hawken 3/40 (10 overs)

Lions won by 49 runs
Boland Park, Paarl
Umpires: Dennis Smith and Murray Brown
Player of the match: Ryan Rickelton (Lions)

- Cape Cobras won the toss and elected to field.

7 February 2020
Scorecard

Warriors; 214 (41.2 overs)	v	Knights; 164 (37.2 overs)
Yaseen Vallie 90* (89); Shaun von Berg 3/31 (9 overs)		Wandile Makwetu 35 (61); Stefan Tait 3/27 (7 overs)

Warriors won by 50 runs
Mangaung Oval, Bloemfontein
Umpires: Philip Vosloo and Stephen Harris
Player of the match: Yaseen Vallie (Warriors)

- Knights won the toss and elected to field.

7 February 2020
Scorecard

Titans; 275/4 (39 overs)	v	Dolphins; 289/5 (38.4 overs)
Dean Elgar 74* (67); Robbie Frylinck 1/42 (8 overs)		Grant Roelofsen 147* (113); Tshepo Moreki 2/74 (7.4 overs)

Dolphins won by 5 wickets (DLS method)
Centurion Park, Centurion
Umpires: Ryan Hendricks and Brad White
Player of the match: Grant Roelofsen (Dolphins)

- Dolphins won the toss and elected to field.

9 February 2020
Scorecard

Warriors; 233/8 (50 overs)	v	Titans; 236/5 (38.4 overs)
Edward Moore 103 (140); Dayyaan Galiem 4/27 (10 overs)		Tony de Zorzi 98 (104); Rudi Second 2/23 (5.4 overs)

Titans won by 5 wickets
St George's Park Cricket Ground, Port Elizabeth
Umpires: Arno Jacobs and Clifford Isaacs

- Titans won the toss and elected to field.

9 February 2020
Scorecard

Cape Cobras; 320/6 (50 overs)	v	Dolphins; 280/9 (43 overs)
Zubayr Hamza 129 (133); Prenelan Subrayen 2/58 (10 overs)		Grant Roelofsen 69 (80); Jason Smith 3/36 (6 overs)

Cape Cobras won by 5 runs (DLS method)
City Oval, Pietermaritzburg
Umpires: Lubabalo Gcuma and Brad White
Player of the match: Zubayr Hamza (Cape Cobras)

- Cape Cobras won the toss and elected to bat.

12 February 2020
Scorecard

Titans; 302/4 (50 overs)	v	Cape Cobras; 207 (43.2 overs)
Dean Elgar 108* (114); Aviwe Mgijima 1/12 (3 overs)		Zubayr Hamza 93 (95); Imran Manack 4/48 (10 overs)

Titans won by 95 runs
Newlands, Cape Town
Umpires: Siphelele Gasa and Dennis Smith
Player of the match: Dean Elgar (Titans)

- Cape Cobras won the toss and elected to field.

14 February 2020
Scorecard

Lions; 221 (47.3 overs)	v	Warriors; 222/4 (43.4 overs)
Delano Potgieter 62 (72); Onke Nyaku 3/39 (8 overs)		Sinethemba Qeshile 66 (77); Wihan Lubbe 1/35 (7 overs)

Warriors won by 6 wickets
St George's Park Cricket Ground, Port Elizabeth
Umpires: Thomas Mokorosi and Dennis Smith
Player of the match: Sinethemba Qeshile (Warriors)

- Warriors won the toss and elected to field.

14 February 2020
Scorecard

Knights; 134 (39.5 overs)	v	Dolphins; 139/4 (21.4 overs)
Raynard van Tonder 40 (75); Keshav Maharaj 4/32 (10 overs)		Grant Roelofsen 56 (44); Ottniel Baartman 2/19 (5 overs)

Dolphins won by 6 wickets
Mangaung Oval, Bloemfontein
Umpires: Philip Vosloo and Murray Brown
Player of the match: Robbie Frylinck (Dolphins)

- Knights won the toss and elected to bat.

16 February 2020
Scorecard

Cape Cobras; 304/8 (50 overs)	v	Lions; 305/9 (49.4 overs)
Zubayr Hamza 156 (124); Aaron Phangiso 4/46 (10 overs)		Delano Potgieter 66 (37); Thando Ntini 4/62 (10 overs)

Lions won by 1 wicket
Senwes Park, Potchefstroom
Umpires: Siphelele Gasa and Lubabalo Gcuma
Player of the match: Zubayr Hamza (Cape Cobras)

- Lions won the toss and elected to field.

18 February 2020
Scorecard

Warriors	v	Knights

Match abandoned
Buffalo Park, East London
Umpires: Dennis Smith and Clifford Isaacs

- No toss.
- No play was possible due to rain.

19 February 2020
Scorecard

Dolphins; 183/8 (50 overs)	v	Cape Cobras; 157 (42.3 overs)
Keshav Maharaj 50* (77); George Linde 2/24 (10 overs)		Aviwe Mgijima 69* (86); Keshav Maharaj 4/24 (10 overs)

Dolphins won by 26 runs
Newlands, Cape Town
Umpires: Lubabalo Gcuma and Thomas Mokorosi
Player of the match: Keshav Maharaj (Dolphins)

- Dolphins won the toss and elected to bat.

22 February 2020
Scorecard

Cape Cobras; 226/5 (42 overs)	v	Knights; 258/7 (35.2 overs)
Jonathan Bird 69 (77); Mbulelo Budaza 2/45 (8 overs)		Jacques Snyman 124 (71); Akhona Mnyaka 3/36 (7 overs)

Knights won by 3 wickets (DLS method)
Diamond Oval, Kimberley
Umpires: Ryan Hendricks and Murray Brown
Player of the match: Jacques Snyman (Knights)

- Knights won the toss and elected to field.

23 February 2020
Scorecard

Warriors; 237/9 (50 overs)	v	Dolphins; 238/3 (46 overs)
Sinethemba Qeshile 80 (104); Keshav Maharaj 2/28 (10 overs)		Sarel Erwee 101* (128); Edward Moore 1/6 (2 overs)

Dolphins won by 7 wickets
City Oval, Pietermaritzburg
Umpires: Siphelele Gasa and Abdoellah Steenkamp
Player of the match: Sarel Erwee (Dolphins)

- Warriors won the toss and elected to bat.

26 February 2020
Scorecard

Lions; 275/9 (50 overs)	v	Knights; 188 (42 overs)
Nicky van den Bergh 91 (112); Mbulelo Budaza 4/45 (10 overs)		Andries Gous 66 (86); Aaron Phangiso 4/30 (9 overs)

Lions won by 87 runs
The Wanderers Stadium, Johannesburg
Umpires: Philip Vosloo and Murray Brown
Player of the match: Nicky van den Bergh (Lions)

- Knights won the toss and elected to field.

27 February 2020
Scorecard

Dolphins; 308/6 (50 overs)	v	Titans; 259 (45.4 overs)
Sarel Erwee 68 (85); Aiden Markram 3/49 (9 overs)		Tony de Zorzi 54 (46); Keshav Maharaj 3/49 (8.4 overs)

Dolphins won by 35 runs (DLS method)
Kingsmead, Durban
Umpires: Arno Jacobs and Thomas Mokorosi
Player of the match: Khaya Zondo (Dolphins)

- Dolphins won the toss and elected to bat.

1 March 2020
Scorecard

Titans; 307 (49.5 overs)	v	Knights; 309/4 (48.3 overs)
Diego Rosier 112 (108); Mbulelo Budaza 5/44 (9.5 overs)		Andries Gous 163* (145); Aiden Markram 2/39 (7 overs)

Knights won by 6 wickets
Diamond Oval, Kimberley
Umpires: Philip Vosloo and Brad White
Player of the match: Andries Gous (Knights)

- Knights won the toss and elected to field.

1 March 2020
Scorecard

Lions; 254/5 (39 overs)	v	Warriors; 240/9 (35 overs)
Reeza Hendricks 112 (105); Stefan Tait 3/48 (8 overs)		Lesiba Ngoepe 94 (70); Bjorn Fortuin 2/37 (8 overs)

Lions won by 9 runs (DLS method)
Wanderers Stadium, Johannesburg
Umpires: Allahudien Paleker and Abdoellah Steenkamp
Player of the match: Reeza Hendricks (Lions)

- Warriors won the toss and elected to field.

5 March 2020
Scorecard

Lions; 244 (49.3 overs)	v	Dolphins; 248/6 (49.3 overs)
Wihan Lubbe 85 (91); Okuhle Cele 2/33 (8.3 overs)		Marques Ackerman 54 (65); Eldred Hawken 4/46 (10 overs)

Dolphins won by 4 wickets
Kingsmead, Durban
Umpires: Thomas Mokorosi and Brad White
Player of the match: Robbie Frylinck (Dolphins)

- Dolphins won the toss and elected to field.

6 March 2020
Scorecard

Titans; 331/4 (50 overs)	v	Warriors; 332/8 (49.5 overs)
Tony de Zorzi 137 (140); Andrew Birch 1/40 (9 overs)		Edward Moore 107 (107); Corbin Bosch 3/68 (10 overs)

Warriors won by 2 wickets
Willowmoore Park, Benoni
Umpires: Ryan Hendricks and Allahudien Paleker
Player of the match: Edward Moore (Warriors)

- Warriors won the toss and elected to field.

7 March 2020
Scorecard

Cape Cobras; 172/9 (50 overs)	v	Knights; 173/3 (27.3 overs)
Aviwe Mgijima 44* (74); Shaun von Berg 3/23 (10 overs)		Patrick Kruger 60 (47); Akhona Mnyaka 2/33 (7 overs)

Knights won by 7 wickets
Recreation Ground, Oudtshoorn
Umpires: Clifford Isaacs and Stephen Harris
Player of the match: Shaun von Berg (Knights)

- Cape Cobras won the toss and elected to bat.

8 March 2020
Scorecard

Warriors; 293/9 (50 overs)	v	Dolphins; 287 (50 overs)
Matthew Breetzke 55 (61); Prenelan Subrayen 2/47 (10 overs)		Cody Chetty 71 (65); Stefan Tait 2/46 (10 overs)

Warriors won by 6 runs
Buffalo Park, East London
Umpires: Thomas Mokorosi and Brad White

- Dolphins won the toss and elected to field.

8 March 2020
Scorecard

Lions; 205/7 (50 overs)	v	Titans; 206/6 (44.4 overs)
Dominic Hendricks 45 (58); Alfred Mothoa 3/36 (10 overs)		Aiden Markram 100 (109); Wihan Lubbe 3/21 (7 overs)

Titans won by 4 wickets
Wanderers Stadium, Johannesburg
Umpires: Arno Jacobs and Allahudien Paleker
Player of the match: Aiden Markram (Titans)

- Titans won the toss and elected to field.

10 March 2020
Scorecard

Lions; 188/7 (42.2 overs)	v	Knights
Ryan Rickelton 62 (68); Shaun von Berg 2/43 (10 overs)

No result
Mangaung Oval, Bloemfontein
Umpires: Bongani Jele and Adrian Holdstock

- Knights won the toss and elected to field.
- Rain during Lions' innings prevented any further play.

11 March 2020
Scorecard

Cape Cobras; 164/7 (32 overs)	v	Titans; 169/4 (30.5 overs)
Pieter Malan 67 (79); Dayyaan Galiem 2/25 (7 overs); Imran Manack 2/25 (7 overs)		Dean Elgar 61* (58); Dane Piedt 2/23 (7 overs)

Titans won by 6 wickets (DLS method)
Willowmoore Park, Benoni
Umpires: Allahudien Paleker and Lubabalo Gcuma
Player of the match: Dean Elgar (Titans)

- Titans won the toss and elected to field.

13 March 2020
Scorecard

Dolphins; 262/9 (50 overs)	v	Lions; 263/6 (48.4 overs)
Grant Roelofsen 71 (75); Ayavuya Myoli 4/49 (10 overs)		Dominic Hendricks 66 (82); Andile Mokgakane 2/35 (4.1 overs)

Lions won by 4 wickets
Senwes Park, Potchefstroom
Umpires: Siphelele Gasa and Stephen Harris
Player of the match: Ayavuya Myoli (Lions)

- Lions won the toss and elected to field.
- Lifa Ntanzi (Dolphins) made his List A debut.

14 March 2020
Scorecard

Cape Cobras; 188 (44.3 overs)	v	Warriors; 191/2 (34.2 overs)
Zubayr Hamza 48 (73); Sisanda Magala 6/24 (8.3 overs)		Matthew Breetzke 80* (84); Dane Paterson 1/36 (8.2 overs)

Warriors won by 8 wickets
Buffalo Park, East London
Umpires: Adrian Holdstock and Brad White
Player of the match: Sisanda Magala (Warriors)

- Cape Cobras won the toss and elected to bat.

15 March 2020
Scorecard

Titans; 138 (31.5 overs)	v	Knights; 141/7 (30.1 overs)
Tony de Zorzi 61 (79); Shaun von Berg 5/33 (8.5 overs)		Jacques Snyman 35 (19); Khwezi Gumede 2/24 (5 overs)

Knights won by 3 wickets
Centurion Park, Centurion
Umpires: Allahudien Paleker and Bongani Jele
Player of the match: Shaun von Berg (Knights)

- Knights won the toss and elected to field.

=== Finals ===
1st semi-final
17 March 2020
Scorecard

Dolphins	v	Knights

Cancelled

2nd semi-final
18 March 2020
Scorecard

Lions	v	Warriors

Cancelled

Final
21 March 2020
Scorecard

TBD	v	TBD

Cancelled
