= Robert Haynes (cricketer) =

West Indian cricketer (born 1964)

Personal information
- Full name: Robert Christopher Haynes
- Born: 2 November 1964 (age 62); Kingston, Jamaica
- Batting: Left-handed
- Bowling: Leg break

International information
- National side: West Indies
- ODI debut (cap 56): 17 October 1989 v Pakistan
- Last ODI: 18 December 1991 v Australia

Domestic team information
- Years: Team
- 1981–1997: Jamaica

Career statistics
Competition	ODI	FC	LA
Matches	8	65	52
Runs scored	26	2,166	574
Batting average	5.20	21.66	15.51
100s/50s	0/0	0/10	0/1
Top score	18	98	83
Balls bowled	270	14,623	2,523
Wickets	5	221	64
Bowling average	44.80	28.62	23.92
5 wickets in innings	0	10	0
10 wickets in match	0	1	0
Best bowling	2/36	6/53	4/22
Catches/stumpings	5/–	55/–	22/–
- Source: CricketArchive, 20 October 2010

Robert Christopher Haynes (born 2 November 1964) is a former West Indian international cricketer who played eight One Day Internationals (ODIs) between 1989 and 1991. Haynes played domestically for Jamaica and later coached the Jamaican side between 1999 and 2006 before being appointed as a selector for the side.

Haynes impressed as a youth cricketer on a 1982 tour of England, playing a key role in both of the unofficial 'Tests' the West Indies side won in a series victory against England's young cricketers. He took 6/36 in the second innings (and 8/50 in the match) in the first match, and scored 80 (batting at no.9) and 51 not out (from no.8), top-scoring in both innings, in the third match.

Most of his One Day International appearances came in the Nehru Cup of 1989–90. He was close to selection for Test cricket later that winter, the Wisden review of the England tour of the West Indies observing that the "West Indies resisted loud local calls to include the Jamaican leg-break bowler, Robert Haynes, who twice caused England problems in representative matches". Specifically Haynes took 3/118 for Jamaica, and 6/90 for the West Indies Cricket Board President's XI, against the tourists that winter.
