= Stuurman =

Stuurman is a surname. Notable people with the surname include:

- David Stuurman (circa 1773–1830), South African activist
- Eric Stuurman (born 1965), Dutch wheelchair tennis player
- Glenton Stuurman (born 1992), South African cricketer
- Pieter Stuurman (born 1981), South African cricketer
