= Vusumuzi =

Vusumuzi is an African masculine given name. Notable people with the name include:

- Vusumuzi Masondo (born 1957), South African military commander
- Vusumuzi Mazibuko (born 1984), South African cricketer
- Vuza Nyoni (Vusumuzi Nyoni, born 1984), Zimbabwean football player
