= 2016 West Indies Tri-Series =

International cricket tournament

West Indies Tri-Nation Series 2016
- Date: 3–26 June 2016
- Location: West Indies
- Result: Australia won the 2016 West Indies Tri-Series
- Player of the series: Josh Hazlewood (Aus)
Teams
West Indies	Australia	South Africa
Captains
Jason Holder	Steve Smith	AB de Villiers
Most runs
Marlon Samuels (258)	Steve Smith (264)	Hashim Amla (241)
Most wickets
Sunil Narine (12)	Josh Hazlewood (11)	Imran Tahir (13)

The 2016 West Indies Tri-Series was a One Day International (ODI) cricket tournament held in the West Indies in June 2016. It was a tri-nation series between the national representative cricket teams of the West Indies, Australia and South Africa. All the matches were played under lights and it was the first time a series in the Caribbean had all the matches played as day-night games. Australia won the tournament by defeating the West Indies by 58 runs in the final.

== Squads ==
West Indies	Australia	South Africa
Jason Holder (c); Sulieman Benn; Carlos Brathwaite; Darren Bravo; Jonathan Carter; Johnson Charles; Andre Fletcher; Shannon Gabriel; Sunil Narine; Ashley Nurse; Kieron Pollard; Denesh Ramdin; Marlon Samuels; Jerome Taylor	Steve Smith (c); ~~David Warner (vc)~~; George Bailey; Scott Boland; Nathan Coulter-Nile; James Faulkner; Aaron Finch; ~~John Hastings~~; Josh Hazlewood; Travis Head; Usman Khawaja; Nathan Lyon; Mitchell Marsh; Glenn Maxwell; Mitchell Starc; Matthew Wade; Adam Zampa	AB de Villiers (c); Kyle Abbott; Hashim Amla; Farhaan Behardien; Quinton de Kock; JP Duminy; Faf du Plessis; Dean Elgar; Imran Tahir; Morne Morkel; Chris Morris; Wayne Parnell; Aaron Phangiso; Kagiso Rabada; ~~Rilee Rossouw~~; Tabraiz Shamsi

John Hastings was ruled out of the tournament with an ankle injury and was replaced with Scott Boland. Rilee Rossouw injured his shoulder during the third ODI match. He was replaced by Dean Elgar. David Warner broke his index finger whilst fielding during the fourth ODI match and was ruled out the rest of the series.

== Points table ==
Pos	Team	Pld	W	L	T	NR	Pts	NRR
1	Australia	6	3	2	0	1	15	0.383
2	West Indies	6	3	3	0	0	13	−0.460
3	South Africa	6	2	3	0	1	12	0.155

Source: ESPNcricinfo

Qualified for the Final

== Matches ==
=== 1st ODI ===
3 June
13:00 (D/N)
Scorecard

South Africa; 188 (46.5 overs)	v	West Indies; 191/6 (48.1 overs)
Rilee Rossouw 61 (83); Sunil Narine 6/27 (9.5 overs)		Kieron Pollard 67* (67); Aaron Phangiso 3/40 (10 overs)

West Indies won by 4 wickets
Providence Stadium, Providence, Guyana
Umpires: Richard Illingworth (Eng) and Joel Wilson (WI)
Player of the match: Sunil Narine (WI)

- South Africa won the toss and elected to bat.
- Quinton de Kock and Hashim Amla opened the batting for South Africa for the 50th time in ODIs.
- Points: West Indies 4, South Africa 0.

=== 2nd ODI ===
5 June
13:00 (D/N)
Scorecard

West Indies; 116 (32.3 overs)	v	Australia; 117/4 (25.4 overs)
Johnson Charles 22 (40); Adam Zampa 3/16 (5.3 overs)		David Warner 55* (55); Sunil Narine 2/36 (10 overs)

Australia won by 6 wickets
Providence Stadium, Providence, Guyana
Umpires: Gregory Brathwaite (WI) and Nigel Llong (Eng)
Player of the match: Nathan Lyon (Aus)

- Australia won the toss and elected to field.
- The start of the match was delayed by 10 minutes due to a wet outfield with no overs lost from play.
- Points: Australia 5, West Indies 0.

=== 3rd ODI ===
7 June
13:00 (D/N)
Scorecard

South Africa; 189/9 (50 overs)	v	Australia; 142 (34.2 overs)
Farhaan Behardien 62 (82); Glenn Maxwell 2/15 (3 overs)		Aaron Finch 72 (103); Kagiso Rabada 3/13 (7 overs)

South Africa won by 47 runs
Providence Stadium, Providence, Guyana
Umpires: Richard Illingworth (Eng) and Joel Wilson (WI)
Player of the match: Farhaan Behardien (SA)

- South Africa won the toss and elected to bat.
- Rain stopped play for 20 minutes during the Australian innings with no overs lost from play.
- Tabraiz Shamsi (SA) made his ODI debut.
- Points: South Africa 5, Australia 0.

=== 4th ODI ===
11 June
13:00 (D/N)
Scorecard

Australia; 288/6 (50 overs)	v	South Africa; 252 (47.4 overs)
David Warner 109 (120); Imran Tahir 2/45 (9 overs)		Faf du Plessis 63 (76); Mitchell Starc 3/43 (10 overs)

Australia won by 36 runs
Warner Park, Basseterre, St. Kitts
Umpires: Nigel Llong (Eng) and Joel Wilson (WI)
Player of the match: David Warner (Aus)

- Australia won the toss and elected to bat.
- Faf du Plessis (SA) passed 3,000 ODI runs.
- Points: Australia 4, South Africa 0.

=== 5th ODI ===
13 June
13:00 (D/N)
Scorecard

Australia; 265/7 (50 overs)	v	West Indies; 266/6 (45.4 overs)
Usman Khawaja 98 (123); Kieron Pollard 2/32 (6 overs)		Marlon Samuels 92 (87); Adam Zampa 2/60 (7 overs)

West Indies won by 4 wickets
Warner Park, Basseterre, St. Kitts
Umpires: Gregory Brathwaite (WI) and Richard Illingworth (Eng)
Player of the match: Marlon Samuels (WI)

- West Indies won the toss and elected to field.
- Travis Head (Aus) made his ODI debut.
- Marlon Samuels (WI) made his highest score in ODIs against Australia. He went on to better this record with a score of 125 during the 8th ODI of this series.
- Points: West Indies 4, Australia 0.

=== 6th ODI ===
15 June
13:00 (D/N)
Scorecard

South Africa; 343/4 (50 overs)	v	West Indies; 204 (38 overs)
Hashim Amla 110 (99); Kieron Pollard 2/64 (9 overs)		Johnson Charles 49 (41); Imran Tahir 7/45 (9 overs)

South Africa won by 139 runs
Warner Park, Basseterre, St. Kitts
Umpires: Gregory Brathwaite (WI) and Nigel Llong (Eng)
Player of the match: Imran Tahir (SA)

- West Indies won the toss and elected to field.
- Hashim Amla (SA) became the fastest to score 23 ODI centuries (132 innings).
- Imran Tahir became the fastest South African to take 100 ODI wickets and recorded the best bowling figures by a South African bowler in ODIs.
- Points: South Africa 5, West Indies 0.

=== 7th ODI ===
19 June
13:00 (D/N)
Scorecard

South Africa; 8/0 (1 over)	v	Australia
Quinton de Kock 5* (5)

No result
Kensington Oval, Bridgetown, Barbados
Umpires: Kumar Dharmasena (SL) and Joel Wilson (WI)

- Australia won the toss and elected to field.
- Rain stopped play after the 1st over of the South African innings and the match was finally called off at 18:25 with no further play possible.
- AB de Villiers played in his 200th ODI match for South Africa. He has also played five ODIs for Africa XI.
- Points: Australia 2, South Africa 2.

=== 8th ODI ===
21 June
13:00 (D/N)
Scorecard

West Indies; 282/8 (50 overs)	v	Australia; 283/4 (48.4 overs)
Marlon Samuels 125 (134); Mitchell Starc 3/51 (10 overs)		Mitchell Marsh 79* (85); Shannon Gabriel 1/43 (9 overs)

Australia won by 6 wickets
Kensington Oval, Bridgetown, Barbados
Umpires: Gregory Brathwaite (WI) and Richard Kettleborough (Eng)
Player of the match: Marlon Samuels (WI)

- Australia won the toss and elected to field.
- Shannon Gabriel (WI) made his ODI debut.
- Denesh Ramdin (WI) passed 2,000 ODI runs.
- Marlon Samuels (WI) made his highest score in ODIs against Australia, bettering his score of 92 during the 5th ODI of this series.
- Australia qualified for the final as a result of this match.
- Points: Australia 4, West Indies 0.

=== 9th ODI ===
24 June
13:00 (D/N)
Scorecard

West Indies; 285 (49.5 overs)	v	South Africa; 185 (46 overs)
Darren Bravo 102 (103); Kagiso Rabada 3/31 (10 overs)		Farhaan Behardien 35 (57); Shannon Gabriel 3/17 (5 overs)

West Indies won by 100 runs
Kensington Oval, Bridgetown, Barbados
Umpires: Gregory Brathwaite (WI) and Kumar Dharmasena (SL)
Player of the match: Darren Bravo (WI)

- South Africa won the toss and elected to field.
- Rain stopped play for 20 minutes during the West Indian innings with no overs lost from play.
- West Indies qualified for the final as a result of this match, while South Africa were eliminated.
- Points: West Indies 5, South Africa 0.

=== Final ===
26 June
13:00 (D/N)
Scorecard

Australia; 270/9 (50 overs)	v	West Indies; 212 (45.4 overs)
Matthew Wade 57* (52); Jason Holder 2/51 (10 overs)		Johnson Charles 45 (61); Josh Hazlewood 5/50 (9.4 overs)

Australia won by 58 runs
Kensington Oval, Bridgetown, Barbados
Umpires: Richard Kettleborough (Eng) and Joel Wilson (WI)
Player of the match: Mitchell Marsh (Aus)

- Australia won the toss and elected to bat.
- Mitchell Marsh (Aus) passed 1,000 ODI runs.
- Australia won the 2016 West Indies Tri-Series.
