= Johan Fourie (cricketer) =

South African cricketer (born 1982)

Personal information
- Born: 1 November 1982 (age 44); Johannesburg, South Africa
- Source: Cricinfo, 1 September 2015

Johan Fourie (born 1 November 1982) is a South African first class cricketer. He was included in the Easterns cricket team squad for the 2015 Africa T20 Cup.
