= Siphamandla Dapo =

South African cricketer (born 1989)

Personal information
- Born: 17 November 1989 (age 36); Port Elizabeth, South Africa
- Source: Cricinfo, 1 September 2015

Siphamandla Dapo (born 17 November 1989) is a South African cricketer. He was included in the Easterns cricket team squad for the 2015 Africa T20 Cup.
