= Lonwabo Rodolo =

South African cricketer (born 1990)

Personal information
- Born: 25 August 1990 (age 36); Alice, South Africa
- Source: Cricinfo, 6 September 2015

Lonwabo Rodolo (born 25 August 1990) is a South African first class cricketer. He was included in the South Western Districts cricket team squad for the 2015 Africa T20 Cup.
