= Tebogo Mokwena =

South African cricketer (born 1988)

Personal information
- Born: 25 May 1988 (age 38); Kimberley, South Africa
- Source: Cricinfo, 4 September 2015

Tebogo Mokwena (born 25 May 1988) is a South African first class cricketer. He was included in the Griqualand West cricket team squad for the 2015 Africa T20 Cup.
