= Karan Kaul =

Kenyan international cricketer (born 1990)

Personal information
- Born: 24 April 1990 (age 36); Dehradun, Uttarakhand, India
- Batting: Right-handed
- Bowling: Right-arm medium-fast

International information
- National side: Kenya (2012–2016)
- Source: CricketArchive, 27 November 2016

Karan Kaul (born 24 April 1990) is a Kenyan international cricketer who made his debut for the Kenya national team in 2011. He is a right-handed middle-order batsman.

Kaul was born in the Indian city of Dehradun, at the time of his birth located in the state of Uttar Pradesh, but now in Uttarakhand. He is of Kashmiri Pandit ancestry. A former Kenyan under-19s player, he made his senior debut for Kenya in July 2011, in a WCL Championship match against the United Arab Emirates. After his debut, Kaul did not return to the national team for over four years. He represented Kenya in a single match at the 2015 Africa T20 Cup, against South African provincial team South Western Districts, and made 18 runs from sixth in the batting order. He had earlier been named in Kenya's squad for the 2015 World Twenty20 Qualifier, but did not play a match.

In January 2018, he was named in Kenya's squad for the 2018 ICC World Cricket League Division Two tournament.
