= Thando Bula =

South African cricketer (born 1981)

Personal information
- Born: 7 January 1981 (age 45); Whittlesea, Eastern Cape, South Africa
- Source: Cricinfo, 1 September 2015

Thando Bula (born 7 January 1981) is a South African first class cricketer. He was included in the Easterns cricket team squad for the 2015 Africa T20 Cup.
