= Gereldo George =

South African cricketer (born 1994)

Personal information
- Full name: Gereldo Joan George
- Born: 24 December 1994 (age 31); Piketberg, South Africa
- Nickname: GG
- Batting: Right-handed
- Bowling: Right-arm off break

Domestic team information
- Years: Team
- 2015–present: Boland
- First-class debut: 8 October 2015 Boland v Namibia
- List A debut: 11 October 2015 Boland v Namibia

Career statistics
Competition	First-class	List A	T20
Matches	5	3	4
Runs scored	10	0	1
Batting average	2.00	0.00	1.00
100s/50s	0/0	0/0	0/1
Top score	6	0*	1*
Balls bowled	468	153	61
Wickets	6	6	0
Bowling average	51.16	17.66	0.00
5 wickets in innings	0	0	0
10 wickets in match	0	0	0
Best bowling	2–22	4–38	0–11
Catches/stumpings	1/–	1/–	1/–
- Source: CricketArchive, 10 July 2016

Gereldo George (born 24 December 1994) is a South African cricketer who currently plays for Boland. He is a right-handed batsman and right-arm off break bowler. Botha made his first-class debut on 8 October 2015 against Namibia.

He was included in the Boland cricket team squad for the 2015 Africa T20 Cup. Boland head coach Johann Louw called him "a mystery spinner who turns the ball both ways".
