= List of international under-19 cricket records =

This is a list of select records in top-level international under-19 cricket (also known as youth cricket), which includes Youth Test (multi-day) matches, Youth One Day International (ODI) matches, and Youth Twenty20 International (T20I) matches. The records are sourced from CricketArchive and Cricinfo, and were last updated on 6 February 2026.

== Under-19 Test cricket ==
=== Team records ===
Teams by date of first match

| Date | Teams |
|---|---|
| 17 July 1974 | England, West Indies |
| 20 January 1979 | India, Pakistan |
| 12 February 1979 | Australia |
| 11 February 1984 | Sri Lanka |
| 6 February 1986 | New Zealand |
| 20 July 1995 | South Africa |
| 13 January 1996 | Zimbabwe |
| 28 July 2004 | Bangladesh |

==== Highest scores ====
| Rank | Score | Team | Opponent | Venue | Date |
|---|---|---|---|---|---|
| 1 | 646/9 d. | South Africa | England | County Ground, Chelmsford | 16–19 August 2003 |
| 2 | 620/9 d. | England | West Indies | Trent Bridge, Nottingham | 15–18 August 2001 |
| 3 | 613/8 d. | India | Sri Lanka | MRICS, Hambantota | 24–27 July 2018 |
| 4 | 611/9 d. | India | Pakistan | Arbab Niaz Stadium, Peshawar | 13–15 September 2006 |
| 5 | 610 | Australia | New Zealand | Cornwall Park, Auckland | 15–18 March 1987 |

==== Lowest scores ====
| Rank | Score | Team | Opponent | Venue | Date |
|---|---|---|---|---|---|
| 1 | 47 | Zimbabwe | England | Harare Sports Club, Harare | 23–25 January 1996 |
| 2 | 66 | New Zealand | Australia | Pukekura Park, New Plymouth | 9–12 March 1987 |
| 3 | 71 | England | Australia | WACA Ground, Perth | 6–8 February 1990 |
| 4 | 74 | West Indies | Australia | Bourda, Georgetown | 31 August – 2 September 1990 |
| 5 | 76 | West Indies | England | St George's College, Weybridge | 10–12 August 1974 |

=== Individual records ===
==== Batting ====
Most career runs

| Rank | Runs | Player | Team | Span |
|---|---|---|---|---|
| 1 | 1,624 | Hasan Raza | Pakistan | 1996–1999 |
| 2 | 1,156 | Tanmay Srivastava | India | 2006–2008 |
| 3 | 1,058 | John Crawley | England | 1989–1991 |
| 4 | 1,032 | Marcus Trescothick | England | 1993–1995 |
| 5 | 932 | Virat Kohli | India | 2006–2008 |

Highest individual scores

| Rank | Score | Player | Team | Opponent | Venue | Date |
|---|---|---|---|---|---|---|
| 1 | 304* | Clinton Peake | Australia | India | Melbourne Cricket Ground, Melbourne | 10–13 March 1995 |
| 2 | 282 | Pawan Shah | India | Sri Lanka | MRICS, Hambantota | 24–27 July 2018 |
| 3 | 267 | Mathew Dowman | England | West Indies | County Ground, Hove | 26–29 August 1993 |
| 4 | 260* | Kevin Sharp | England | West Indies | County Ground, Worcester | 5–8 August 1978 |
| 5 | 254 | Gordon Muchall | England | India | Sophia Gardens, Cardiff | 27–30 July 2002 |

==== Bowling ====
Most career wickets

| Rank | Wickets | Player | Team | Span |
|---|---|---|---|---|
| 1 | 64 | Abdul Razzaq | Pakistan | 1996–1997 |
| 2 | 57 | Imran Tahir | Pakistan | 1996–1997 |
| 3 | 52 | Balaji Rao | India | 1994–1997 |
| 4 | 43 | Ashish Zaidi | India | 1989–1990 |
| 5 | 41 | Piyush Chawla | India | 2005–2007 |

== Under-19 ODI cricket ==
=== Team records ===
==== Highest scores ====
| Rank | Score | Team | Opponent | Venue | Date |
|---|---|---|---|---|---|
| 1 | 480/6 | Australia | Kenya | Carisbrook, Dunedin | 20 January 2002 |
| 2 | 445/4 | India | Malaysia | The Sevens Stadium, Dubai | 16 December 2025 |
| 3 | 436/4 | New Zealand | Kenya | Hagley Oval, Christchurch | 17 January 2018 |
| 4 | 433/6 | India | United Arab Emirates | ICC Academy Ground, Dubai | 12 December 2025 |
| 5 | 425/3 | India | Scotland | Bangabandhu National Stadium, Dhaka | 16 February 2004 |
| 6 | 419/4 | Sri Lanka | Kenya | Lincoln No 3, Lincoln | 23 January 2018 |
| 7 | 411/9 | India | England | Harare Sports Club, Harare | 6 February 2026 |

==== Lowest scores ====
| Rank | Score | Team | Opponent | Venue | Date |
|---|---|---|---|---|---|
| 1 | 22 | Scotland | Australia | M. A. Aziz Stadium, Chittagong | 22 February 2004 |
| 2 | 34 | Bangladesh | India | Gaddafi Stadium, Lahore | 4 November 2003 |
| 3 | 41 | Canada | South Africa | North Harbour Stadium, Albany | 25 January 2002 |
| 4 | 41 | Japan | India | Mangaung Oval, Bloemfontein | 21 January 2020 |
| 5 | 41 | Bangladesh | South Africa | Bayuemas Oval, Kuala Lumpur | 24 February 2008 |

=== Individual records ===
==== Batting ====
Most career runs

| Rank | Runs | Player | Team | Span |
|---|---|---|---|---|
| 1 | 1,820 | Nazmul Hossain Shanto | Bangladesh | 2013–2016 |
| 2 | 1,695 | Sami Aslam | Pakistan | 2012–2014 |
| 3 | 1,624 | Hasan Raza | Pakistan | 1996–1999 |
| 4 | 1,624 | Towhid Hridoy | Bangladesh | 2017–2020 |
| 5 | 1,412 | Vaibhav Sooryavanshi | India | 2024–2026 |

Highest individual scores

| Rank | Score | Player | Team | Opponent | Venue | Date |
|---|---|---|---|---|---|---|
| 1 | 215 | Jorich van Schalkwyk | South Africa | Zimbabwe | Sunrise Sports Club, Harare | 25 July 2025 |
| 2 | 209* | Abhigyan Kundu | India | Malaysia | The Sevens Stadium, Dubai | 16 December 2025 |
| 3 | 192 | Viran Chamuditha | Sri Lanka | Japan | Wanderers Cricket Ground, Windhoek | 17 January 2026 |
| 4 | 191 | Ben Mayes | England | Scotland | Harare Sports Club, Harare | 21 January 2026 |
| 5 | 191 | Hasitha Boyagoda | Sri Lanka | Kenya | Lincoln No 3, Lincoln | 23 January 2018 |

Note: Vaibhav Sooryavanshi's 175 off 80 balls (6 February 2026) is the highest score in a World Cup Final, but ranks 9th on the all-time list.

==== Bowling ====
Most career wickets

| Rank | Wickets | Player | Team | Span |
|---|---|---|---|---|
| 1 | 80 | Mehedi Hasan Miraz | Bangladesh | 2013–2016 |
| 2 | 73 | Imad Wasim | Pakistan | 2005–2008 |
| 3 | 71 | Piyush Chawla | India | 2003–2007 |
| 4 | 66 | Mahmudul Hasan | Bangladesh | 2007–2010 |
| 5 | 64 | Sachith Pathirana | Sri Lanka | 2005–2008 |

Best bowling in an innings

| Rank | Figures | Player | Team | Opponent | Venue | Date |
|---|---|---|---|---|---|---|
| 1 | 9/16 | Irfan Pathan | India | Bangladesh | Gaddafi Stadium, Lahore | 4 November 2003 |
| 2 | 7/19 | Jeevan Mendis | Sri Lanka | Zimbabwe | Hagley Oval, Christchurch | 24 January 2002 |
| 3 | 7/20 | Trent Boult | New Zealand | Malaysia | Johor Cricket Academy Oval, Johor | 21 February 2008 |
| 4 | 7/41 | Justin Bishop | England | West Indies | County Ground, Chelmsford | 29 July 2001 |
| 5 | 6/3 | Rahul Vishwakarma | Nepal | Papua New Guinea | Peter Burge Oval, Brisbane | 23 August 2012 |

== Under-19 T20I cricket ==
Note: Youth T20 Internationals are played infrequently. The last major update to these records occurred prior to the 2024–2026 cycle, as major tournaments like the Asia Cup and World Cup were played in the ODI format.

=== Team records ===
==== Highest scores ====
| Rank | Score | Team | Opponent | Venue | Date |
|---|---|---|---|---|---|
| 1 | 209/2 | South Africa | Zimbabwe | Harare Sports Club, Harare | 12 July 2010 |
| 2 | 184/8 | South Africa | Zimbabwe | Boland Park, Paarl | 22 January 2011 |
| 3 | 166/1 | South Africa | Zimbabwe | Harare Sports Club, Harare | 12 July 2010 |
| 4 | 166/8 | Zimbabwe | South Africa | Harare Sports Club, Harare | 12 July 2010 |
| 5 | 165/7 | Zimbabwe | South Africa | Harare Sports Club, Harare | 12 July 2010 |

=== Individual records ===
==== Batting ====
Most career runs

| Rank | Runs | Player | Team | Span |
|---|---|---|---|---|
| 1 | 221 | James Price | South Africa | 2010–2011 |
| 2 | 151 | Quinton de Kock | South Africa | 2011 |
| 3 | 137 | Keaton Jennings | South Africa | 2010–2011 |
| 4 | 107 | Kevin Kasuza | Zimbabwe | 2011 |
| 5 | 90 | Jack Manuel | England | 2009–2010 |

Highest individual scores

| Rank | Score | Player | Team | Opponent | Venue | Date |
|---|---|---|---|---|---|---|
| 1 | 102* | Quinton de Kock | South Africa | Zimbabwe | Northerns–Goodwood Cricket Club Oval, Goodwood | 23 January 2011 |
| 2 | 98* | James Price | South Africa | Zimbabwe | Harare Sports Club, Harare | 12 July 2010 |
| 3 | 74* | Faraz Ali | Pakistan | Zimbabwe | St. George's College, Harare | 9 October 2009 |
| 4 | 74 | Amit Majumder | Bangladesh | England | London Road, Sleaford | 28 July 2009 |
| 5 | 72* | Rameez Aziz | Pakistan | Zimbabwe | St. John's College, Harare | 2 October 2009 |

==== Bowling ====
Most career wickets

| Rank | Wickets | Player | Team | Span |
|---|---|---|---|---|
| 1 | 5 | Kaleem Sana | Pakistan | 2009 |
| 1 | 5 | Keagan Rafferty | South Africa | 2010–2011 |
| 3 | 4 | Azeem Rafiq | England | 2009 |
| 3 | 4 | Chathura Peiris | Sri Lanka | 2010 |
| 3 | 4 | Obus Pienaar | South Africa | 2009 |
| 3 | 4 | Tanzim Hasan Sakib | Bangladesh | 2019 |
