= Zaid Saloojee =

South African cricketer (born 1989)

Personal information
- Born: 25 May 1989 (age 37)
- Source: Cricinfo, 6 September 2015

Zaid Saloojee (born 25 May 1989) is a South African first class cricketer. He was included in the Gauteng cricket team squad for the 2015 Africa T20 Cup.
