= Thabo Masheshemane =

South African cricketer (born 1993)

Personal information
- Born: 1 February 1993 (age 33); Welkom, South Africa
- Source: Cricinfo, 6 September 2015

Thabo Masheshemane (born 1 February 1993) is a South African first class cricketer. He was included in the Free State cricket team squad for the 2015 Africa T20 Cup.
