= Dewald Botha =

South African cricketer (born 1991)

Personal information
- Full name: Dewald Botha
- Born: 23 September 1991 (age 35); Bellville, South Africa
- Batting: Right-handed
- Bowling: Right-arm off break

Domestic team information
- Years: Team
- 2010–present: Boland
- First-class debut: 10 February 2011 Boland v Northerns
- List A debut: 20 February 2011 Boland v Griqualand West

Career statistics
Competition	First-class	List A
Matches	9	6
Runs scored	255	137
Batting average	19.61	45.66
100s/50s	0/2	0/1
Top score	68*	62*
Balls bowled	111	46
Wickets	3	1
Bowling average	33.33	39.00
5 wickets in innings	0	0
10 wickets in match	0	0
Best bowling	2–8	1–13
Catches/stumpings	1/–	3/–
- Source: CricketArchive, 3 April 2012

Dewald Botha (born 23 September 1991) is a South African cricketer who currently plays for Boland. He is a right-handed batsman and right-arm off break bowler. Botha made his first-class debut on 10 February 2011 against Northerns. He was included in the Boland cricket team squad for the 2015 Africa T20 Cup.
