= Lifa Ntanzi =

South African cricketer (born 2001)

Personal information
- Full name: Lifa Shinga Ntanzi
- Born: 13 August 2001 (age 25); KwaZulu-Natal
- Batting: Right-handed
- Bowling: Right-arm fast

Domestic team information
- Years: Team
- 2019/20: KwaZulu-Natal
- 2019/20–2020/21: Dolphins
- 2020/21: KwaZulu-Natal Inland
- 2024/25: South Western Districts
- Source: Cricinfo, 18 July 2025

Lifa Shinga Ntanzi (born 13 August 2001) is a South African cricketer. He made his Twenty20 debut for KwaZulu-Natal in the 2019–20 CSA Provincial T20 Cup on 13 September 2019. He made his List A debut on 13 March 2020, for Dolphins in the 2019–20 Momentum One Day Cup. He made his first-class debut on 9 November 2020, also for Dolphins, in the 2020–21 CSA 4-Day Franchise Series.

In April 2021, Ntazni was named in the South Africa Emerging Men's squad for their six-match tour of Namibia. Later the same month, he was named in KwaZulu-Natal's squad, ahead of the 2021–22 cricket season in South Africa.
