= Vusumuzi Mazibuko =

South African cricketer (born 1984)

Personal information
- Born: 5 August 1984 (age 42); Johannesburg, South Africa
- Source: Cricinfo, 3 September 2015

Vusumuzi Mazibuko (born 5 August 1984) is a South African first class cricketer. He was included in the North West cricket team squad for the 2015 Africa T20 Cup.
