= Mike Bredenkamp =

South African rugby union player (b. 1873, d. 1940)

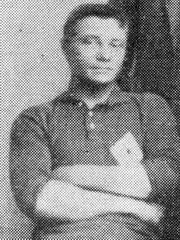
- Born: Michael John Bredenkamp; 2 May 1873
- Died: 22 December 1940 (aged 67)

Rugby union career
- Position: Forward
Provincial / State sides
Years	Team	Apps	(Points)
1896	Griquas	0	(0)
International career
Years	Team	Apps	(Points)
1896	South Africa	2	(0)
- Correct as of 27 May 2019

Mike Bredenkamp (2 May 1873 – 22 December 1940) was a South African international rugby union player who played as a forward.

He made 2 appearances for South Africa against the British Lions in 1896.
