= Ruben Claassen =

South African cricketer (born 1993)

Personal information
- Born: 12 August 1993 (age 33)
- Source: ESPNcricinfo, 15 September 2016

Ruben Claassen (born 12 August 1993) is a South African first-class cricketer. He was included in the Northerns squad for the 2016 Africa T20 Cup.
