= Grant Roelofsen =

South African cricketer (born 1996)

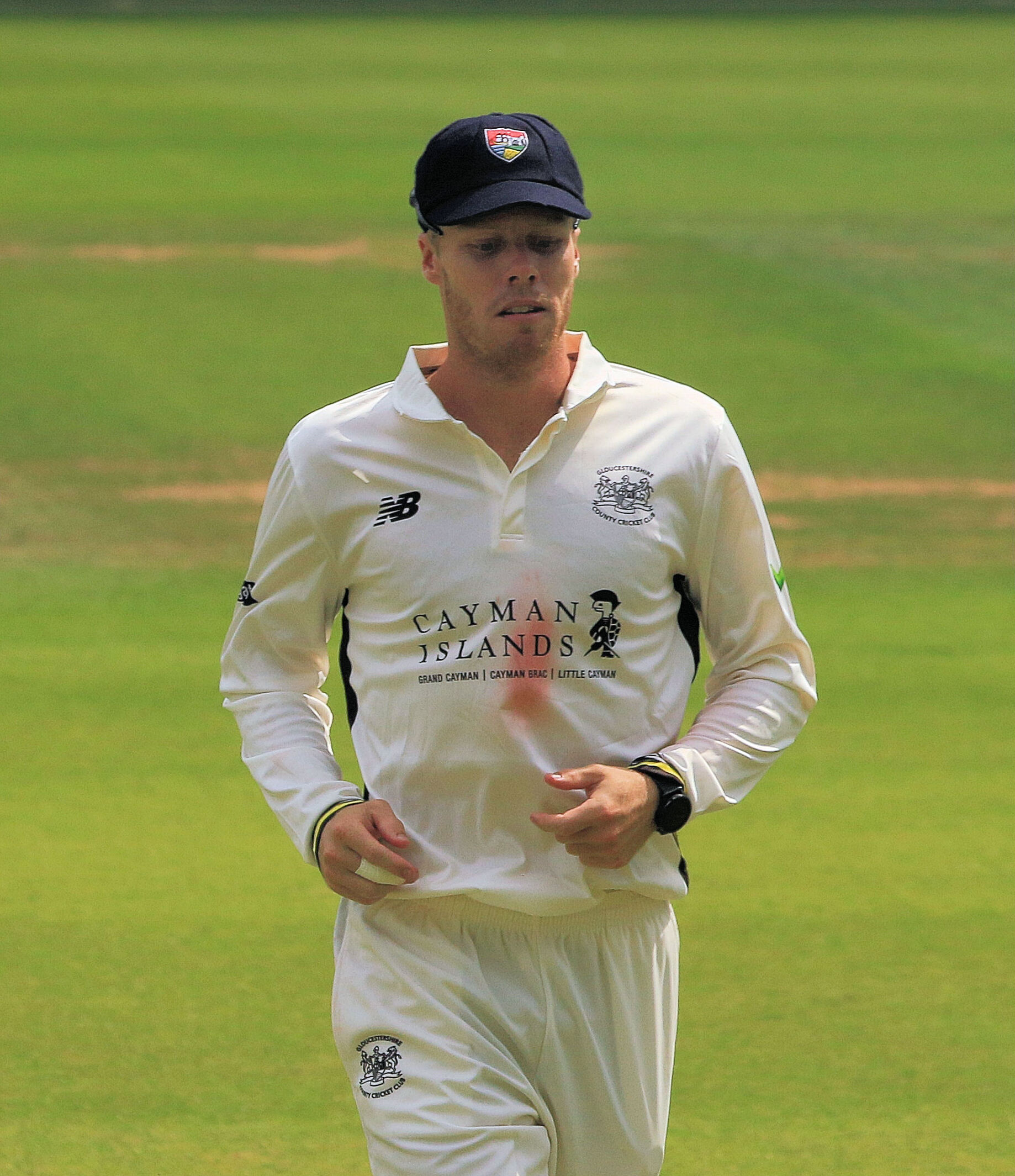
- Roelofsen in 2023

Personal information
- Full name: Grant Roelofsen
- Born: 26 July 1996 (age 30); Johannesburg, South Africa
- Batting: Right-handed
- Role: Wicket-keeper

Domestic team information
- Years: Team
- 2015/16–2016/17: Gauteng
- 2017/18–2019/20: KwaZulu-Natal Inland
- 2018/19–2020/21: Dolphins
- 2021/22–2023/24: KwaZulu-Natal
- 2022: Essex
- 2023: MI Cape Town
- 2023: Gloucestershire
- 2024/25: Boland
- 2026: Essex
- FC debut: 13 October 2016 Gauteng v KZN-Inland
- LA debut: 21 March 2016 Gauteng v Easterns

Career statistics
Competition	FC	LA	T20
Matches	68	76	88
Runs scored	3,898	2,383	2,245
Batting average	40.60	34.53	29.94
100s/50s	11/14	2/17	0/14
Top score	240	147*	91
Catches/stumpings	124/12	61/13	54/13
- Source: ESPNcricinfo, 12 August 2026

Grant Roelofsen (born 26 July 1996) is a South African cricketer. He made his first-class debut for Gauteng in the 2016–17 Sunfoil 3-Day Cup on 13 October 2016. He was the leading run-scorer in the 2017–18 Sunfoil 3-Day Cup for KwaZulu-Natal Inland, with 781 runs in ten matches.

In September 2018, he was named in KwaZulu-Natal Inland's squad for the 2018 Africa T20 Cup. He was the leading run-scorer in the 2019–20 Momentum One Day Cup, with 588 runs in ten matches. In July 2020, Roelofsen was named one-day player of the year at Cricket South Africa's annual awards ceremony.

In April 2021, Roelofsen was named in the South Africa Emerging Men's squad for their six-match tour of Namibia. Later the same month, he was named in KwaZulu-Natal's squad, ahead of the 2021–22 cricket season in South Africa.
