= Piet Botha (professor) =

South African businessman

- Born: May 15, 1948 (age 78)
- Education: University of South Africa
- Children: 3

Piet Botha is a South African businessman and CEO of Subtropico Ltd. A chartered accountant by training, Botha has a doctorate in commerce from the University of Pretoria.

After serving his articles, Botha worked as an accountant at Federale Volksbellegings and as a professor in the Faculty of Commerce at the University of Pretoria. He was a partner at auditing firm Coopers Theron du Toit and a senior general manager at Rand Merchant Bank before being CEO of Subtropico Ltd and its subsidiaries.

Among his non-executive directorships, Botha is chairman of Constantia Ondernemings Ltd, Nationlink (SA) Ltd, Natsure Holdings, Vleissentraal (Pty) Ltd and the Pretoria Eye Institute. He is the deputy chairperson of the Council of the University of Pretoria.
