= James Price (cricketer) =

South African cricketer (born 1992)

Personal information
- Born: 8 January 1992 (age 34); Port Elizabeth, South Africa
- Source: Cricinfo, 3 September 2015

James Price (born 8 January 1992) is a South African first class cricketer. He was included in the Eastern Province cricket team squad for the 2015 Africa T20 Cup. Price went to school at St. Andrew's College, Grahamstown.
