= Deon Smith =

South African cricketer (born 1968)

Personal information
- Full name: Deon Desmond Smith
- Born: 30 March 1968 (age 58); Stellenbosch, Cape Province, South Africa
- Batting: Left-handed
- Bowling: Right-arm fast
- Role: Bowler

Domestic team information
- Years: Team
- 1991–1994: Boland
- 1993–1994: Boland B

Career statistics
Competition	FC
Matches	11
Runs scored	22
Batting average	2.44
100s/50s	0/0
Top score	7*
Balls bowled	1,533
Wickets	22
Bowling average	33.31
5 wickets in innings	1
10 wickets in match	0
Best bowling	5/80
Catches/stumpings	4/–
- Source: CricketArchive, 1 September 2015

Deon Dewald Smith (born 30 March 1968) is a South African former cricketer who is the current coach of South Western Districts at South African provincial level. His first-class player career for Boland spanned 1991 to 1994.

Born in Stellenbosch, Smith made his first-class debut in January 1991, against Border during the 1990–91 season of the Castle Bowl (the second division of the Currie Cup). A right-arm fast bowler who batted with the opposite hand, in his first match he took 2/26 and 4/59, which included the wicket of South African international Peter Kirsten in both innings. Despite his debut performance, Smith played only irregularly for Boland over the following years, although he did play the entire 1993–94 season for the Boland second XI (known as Boland B). That team had gained first-class status for a single season only, following the senior Boland team's promotion to the main division. Smith's only five-wicket haul, 5/80 from 31.3 overs, came against Griqualand West in the first match of the 1993–94 season. His final match at first-class level came in March 1994, when Boland played the touring Australians. Smith finished his career with 22 wickets from 11 matches, and made exactly the same number of runs, which came at a batting average of only 2.44.

Smith was appointed coach of South Western Districts for the 2006–07 season, its inaugural season in the CSA Provincial Competitions, and remained in the role until the end of the 2008–09 season. In August 2014, he was re-appointed coach of the team for the 2014–15 season, and in June 2015, it was announced that he had been retained for the following 2015–16 season, including the inaugural Africa T20 Cup.
