= Pieter Stuurman =

South African cricketer (born 1981)

Personal information
- Born: 23 May 1981 (age 45); Dysselsdorp, South Africa
- Source: Cricinfo, 6 September 2015

Pieter Stuurman (born 23 May 1981) is a South African first class cricketer. He was included in the South Western Districts cricket team squad for the 2015 Africa T20 Cup.
