= Tabraiz Shamsi =

South African cricketer (born 1990)

Personal information
- Born: 18 February 1990 (age 36); Johannesburg, Gauteng Province, South Africa
- Batting: Right handed
- Bowling: Left-arm unorthodox spin
- Role: Bowler

International information
- National side: South Africa (2016–present)
- Test debut (cap 328): 24 November 2016 v Australia
- Last Test: 12 July 2018 v Sri Lanka
- ODI debut (cap 116): 7 June 2016 v Australia
- Last ODI: 12 February 2025 v Pakistan
- T20I debut (cap 72): 21 June 2017 v England
- Last T20I: 29 June 2024 v India

Domestic team information
- Years: Team
- 2010/11–2013/14 (Note: Sides which Shamsi played for in only one season have been omitted from this list.): Dolphins
- 2011/12–2013/14: KwaZulu-Natal Inland
- 2014/14–2015/16: Easterns
- 2014/15–2020/21: Titans
- 2015–2018: St Kitts and Nevis Patriots
- 2018/19–2019/20: Paarl Rocks
- 2021/22–: Northerns
- 2023–2024: Paarl Royals
- 2025/26–: Adelaide Strikers

Career statistics
Competition	Test	ODI	T20I	FC
Matches	2	55	70	84
Runs scored	20	39	10	568
Batting average	20.0	9.75	2.00	7.88
100s/50s	0/0	0/0	0/0	0/0
Top score	18*	11*	4*	36
Balls bowled	483	2,697	1,509	15,574
Wickets	6	73	89	334
Bowling average	46.33	34.38	20.89	26.52
5 wickets in innings	0	1	1	22
10 wickets in match	0	0	0	5
Best bowling	3/91	5/49	5/24	8/32
Catches/stumpings	0/–	9/–	12/–	21/–
Medal record
Men's Cricket
Representing South Africa
ICC T20 World Cup
Runner-up	2024 West Indies & USA
- Source: ESPNcricinfo, 27 June 2025

Tabraiz Shamsi (born 18 February 1990) is a South African professional cricketer. He made his international debut in June 2016 in the Caribbean. He is widely regarded as one of the best in T20 cricket, with him being the highest wicket taker in T20 history for South Africa. He has played first-class cricket for teams such as Dolphins, Gauteng, Gauteng Under-19s, KwaZulu Natal, KwaZulu-Natal Inland, Lions, and Titans. His batting style is right-handed and he is known for his left-arm unorthodox spin bowling. He is known for his passionate celebrations when taking wickets. Shamsi plays for the Karachi Kings in the Pakistan Super League. He also represents the Joburg Super Kings in the SA20 and the Adelaide Strikers in the Australian Big Bash League.

== Early life ==
Growing up, Shamsi initially played as a frontline seam bowler in school cricket competitions when he was in high school. However, his coaches told him that he was not quite quick enough to be a seam bowler when he underwent trials for the under-19 team. His coaches suggested he become a spin bowler as he also reportedly bowled a lot of cutters.

== Domestic and T20 career ==
Shamsi was the leading wicket-taker for the St Kitts and Nevis Patriots in the Caribbean Premier League T20 in 2015. He was included in the Easterns cricket team squad for the 2015 Africa T20 Cup.

In April 2016, Shamsi was signed by Royal Challengers Bangalore as a replacement player for the injured Samuel Badree during the 2016 IPL and made his debut against Rising Pune Supergiants at Maharashtra Cricket Association Stadium in Pune where he took 1/36 in 4 overs as Royal Challengers Bangalore won by 13 runs.

In August 2017, Shamsi was named in Stellenbosch Monarchs' squad for the first season of the T20 Global League. However, in October 2017, Cricket South Africa initially postponed the tournament until November 2018, with it being cancelled soon after.

Shamsi was the leading wicket-taker in the 2017–18 Ram Slam T20 Challenge, finishing the tournament with 16 wickets from 11 matches. He was also the leading wicket-taker in the 2017–18 Momentum One Day Cup, with 26 wickets in 9 matches.

In June 2018, Shamsi was named in the squad for the Titans team for the 2018–19 season. In October 2018, he was named in Paarl Rocks' squad for the first edition of the Mzansi Super League T20 tournament. He was the joint-leading wicket-taker for the team in the tournament, with ten dismissals in nine matches.

In July 2019, Shamsi was selected to play for the Edinburgh Rocks in the inaugural edition of the Euro T20 Slam cricket tournament. However, the following month the tournament was cancelled. He was signed by Hampshire County Cricket Club for the final four group stage matches as an injury replacement to Mason Crane and Brad Taylor during the 2019 Vitality Blast.

In September 2019, Shamsi was named in the squad for the Paarl Rocks team for the 2019 Mzansi Super League tournament. In July 2020, he was named in the Jamaica Tallawahs squad for the 2020 Caribbean Premier League. However, Shamsi was one of five South African cricketers to miss the tournament, after failing to confirm travel arrangements in due time.

In November 2020, in the second round of the 2020–21 CSA 4-Day Franchise Series, Shamsi took eight wickets for 32 runs in the second innings against Warriors, to record the best bowling figures for Titans in a first-class match.

In April 2021, Shamsi was named in Northerns' squad, ahead of the 2021–22 cricket season in South Africa. On 25 August 2021, Shamsi was included in the Rajasthan Royals squad for the second phase of the 2021 IPL in the United Arab Emirates as a replacement player for Andrew Tye. In November 2021, he was selected to play for the Galle Gladiators following the players' draft for the 2021 Lanka Premier League.

Shamsi played in the Australian Big Bash 2025-26 series for the Adelaide Strikers as one of their international players.

== International career ==
In May 2016, Shamsi was named in South Africa's squad for the 2016 West Indies Tri-Series which started the following month. He made his One Day International (ODI) debut during the tournament on 7 June 2016 against Australia.

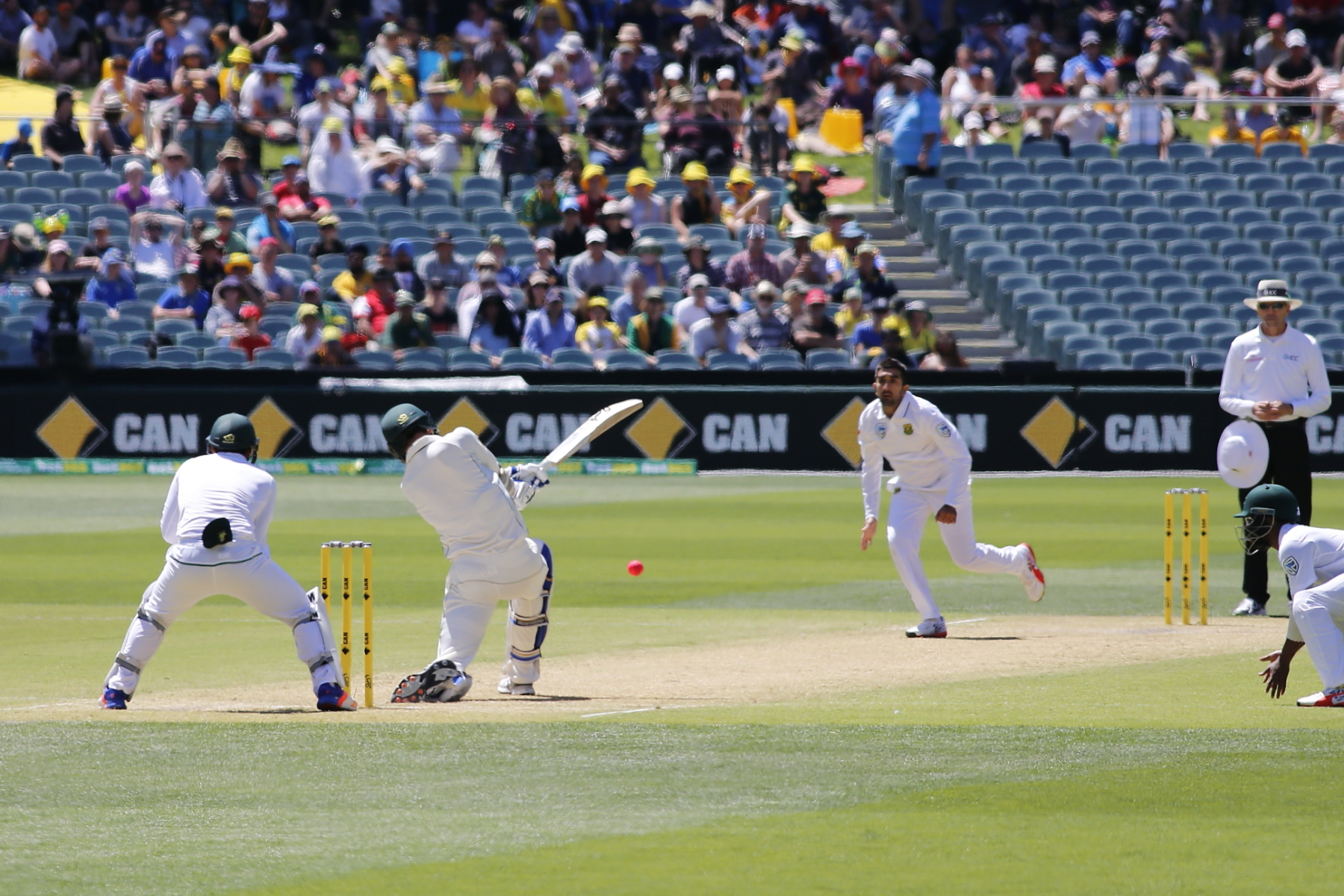
Shamsi bowling to Mitchell Starc on test debut (2016)

Shamsi made his Test debut for South Africa against Australia on 24 November 2016. Nathan Lyon became his first test wicket, which he captured in his debut Test.

Shamsi made his Twenty20 International (T20I) debut for South Africa against England on 21 June 2017.

In April 2019, Shamzi was named in 15 man South Africa's squad for the 2019 Cricket World Cup. Following the retirement of veteran legspinner Imran Tahir from ODI cricket in 2019, Shamsi has emerged as the main first choice spinner for South Africa in limited overs cricket.

In March 2021, Shamsi topped the ICC T20I rankings for bowlers for the first time in his career following his impressive performance in the 3 match T20I series against Pakistan in Pakistan picking up 6 wickets. In September 2021, in the second match against Sri Lanka, Shamsi took his first five-wicket haul in ODIs. Later the same month, Shamsi was named in South Africa's squad for the 2021 ICC Men's T20 World Cup.

On 31 July 2022, in the final match of South Africa's three-match T20I series against England at the Rose Bowl in Southampton, Shamsi took figures of 5/24 in his four overs, making him the sixth player to take a five-wicket haul for South Africa in T20Is. His fourth wicket was his 65th in the format, overtaking Dale Steyn, as the highest wicket-taker ever for South Africa in T20Is.

In May 2024, he was named in South Africa's squad for the 2024 ICC Men's T20 World Cup tournament.
