= Luthando Mnyanda =

South African cricketer (born 1989)

Personal information
- Born: 22 October 1989 (age 37); East London, South Africa
- Source: Cricinfo, 6 September 2015

Luthando Mnyanda (born 22 October 1989) is a South African cricketer. He was included in the South Western Districts cricket team squad for the 2015 Africa T20 Cup.
