= Niel Bredenkamp =

South African cricketer (born 1987)

Personal information
- Born: 22 July 1987 (age 39); Potchefstroom, South Africa
- Source: Cricinfo, 3 September 2015

Niel Bredenkamp (born 22 July 1987) is a South African first class cricketer. He was included in the North West cricket team squad for the 2015 Africa T20 Cup.
