= Piet Botha (cricketer) =

South African cricketer (born 1966)

- Botha with South Africa in 2026

Personal information
- Born: 28 September 1966 (age 60); Vereeniging, South Africa

Career statistics
Competition	FC	LA
Matches	118	110
Runs scored	4,982	1,967
Batting average	25.68	25.88
100s/50s	5/25	1/12
Top score	136	105
Balls bowled	13,827	3,948
Wickets	217	99
Bowling average	27.77	28.21
5 wickets in innings	5	0
10 wickets in match	0	0
Best bowling	6/32	4/37
Catches/stumpings	61/–	26/–
- Source: Cricinfo, 6 December 2020

Piet Botha (born 28 September 1966) is a South African cricketer. He played in 118 first-class and 110 List A matches from 1987/88 to 2001/02.

He is the coach education manager for South Western Districts.

Botha has been the bowling coach for South Africa since 2023.
