= Akhona Mnyaka =

South African cricketer (born 1999)

Personal information
- Born: 22 June 1999 (age 27)
- Source: Cricinfo, 12 March 2017

Akhona Mnyaka (born 22 June 1999) is a South African cricketer. He made his List A debut for Border in the 2016–17 CSA Provincial One-Day Challenge on 12 March 2017. In August 2017, he was named in Bloem City Blazers' squad for the first season of the T20 Global League. However, in October 2017, Cricket South Africa initially postponed the tournament until November 2018, with it being cancelled soon after.

In December 2017, he was named in South Africa's squad for the 2018 Under-19 Cricket World Cup. He was the leading wicket-taker for South Africa in the tournament, with 9 wickets.

In September 2019, he was named in the squad for the Nelson Mandela Bay Giants team for the 2019 Mzansi Super League tournament. In April 2021, he was named in Eastern Province's squad, ahead of the 2021–22 cricket season in South Africa.
