= Rivaldo Moonsamy =

South African cricketer (born 1996)

Personal information
- Born: 13 September 1996 (age 30); Durban, South Africa
- Batting: Right-handed
- Bowling: Right-arm Offbreak

Domestic team information
- Years: Team
- 2015–present: Northerns
- 2017–2018: Benoni Zalmi
- 2018–present: Titans
- 2021–present: Northern Cape

Career statistics
Competition	FC	LA
Matches	74	79
Runs scored	3,968	1,936
Batting average	38.90	30.73
100s/50s	11/19	4/8
Top score	154	126
Balls bowled	164	43
Wickets	4	1
Bowling average	23.50	45.00
5 wickets in innings	0	0
10 wickets in match	0	0
Best bowling	1/4	1/21
Catches/stumpings	146/10	13/0
- Source: Cricinfo, 21 December 2015

Rivaldo Moonsamy (born 13 September 1996) is a South African cricketer who plays for the Titans. In December 2015, he was named in South Africa's squad for the 2016 Under-19 Cricket World Cup. In August 2017, he was named in Benoni Zalmi's squad for the first season of the T20 Global League. However, in October 2017, Cricket South Africa initially postponed the tournament until November 2018, with it being cancelled soon after.

On 7 January 2017, he scored his maiden century in List A cricket, batting for the Titans against the Warriors in the 2017-18 Momentum One Day Cup.

In June 2018, he was named in the squad for the Titans team for the 2018–19 season. In September 2018, he was named in the Titans' squad for the 2018 Abu Dhabi T20 Trophy. In April 2021, he was named in the Northern Cape's squad ahead of the 2021–22 cricket season in South Africa.
