= Mbulelo Budaza =

South African cricketer (born 1993)

Personal information
- Born: 6 September 1993 (age 33); Grahamstown, South Africa
- Batting: Right handed
- Bowling: Left arm Fast
- Role: Bowler
- Source: Cricinfo, 4 September 2015

Mbulelo Budaza (born 6 September 1993) is a South African cricketer. He was included in the Griqualand West cricket team squad for the 2015 Africa T20 Cup. He was the joint-leading wicket-taker in the 2019–20 Momentum One Day Cup, with eighteen dismissals in eight matches. In April 2021, he was named in Free State's squad, ahead of the 2021–22 cricket season in South Africa.
