= Aviwe Mgijima =

South African cricketer

Personal information
- Full name: Aviwe Mgijima
- Born: 10 August 1988 (age 38); East London, Cape Province, South Africa
- Batting: Right-handed
- Bowling: Right-arm off break
- Role: All-rounder

Domestic team information
- Years: Team
- 2007/08: Border
- 2009/10–present: Western Province
- 2013/14–2020/21: Cape Cobras
- 2018/19–2019/20: South Western Districts
- 2019: Cape Town Blitz

Career statistics
Competition	FC	LA	T20
Matches	85	79	82
Runs scored	2,884	1,246	576
Batting average	25.75	20.76	14.40
100s/50s	2/15	0/7	0/1
Top score	112	77	55*
Balls bowled	3,923	667	418
Wickets	64	25	21
Bowling average	33.04	22.88	26.66
5 wickets in innings	1	0	0
10 wickets in match	0	0	0
Best bowling	5/24	3/21	3/14
Catches/stumpings	63/–	32/–	32/–
- Source: ESPNcricinfo, 27 January 2023

Aviwe Mgijima (born 10 August 1988) is a South African cricketer. He was included in the Western Province cricket team squad for the 2015 Africa T20 Cup. In August 2017, he was named in Cape Town Knight Riders' squad for the first season of the T20 Global League. However, in October 2017, Cricket South Africa initially postponed the tournament until November 2018, with it being cancelled soon after.

In September 2017, he scored his maiden first-class century playing for Cape Cobras against Knights in the 2017–18 Sunfoil Series, and has since scored a second. In June 2018, he was named in the squad for the Cape Cobras team for the 2018–19 season.

In September 2018, he was named in South Western Districts' squad for the 2018 Africa T20 Cup. In September 2019, he was named in the squad for the Cape Town Blitz team for the 2019 Mzansi Super League tournament. In April 2021, he was named in Western Province's squad, ahead of the 2021–22 cricket season in South Africa.
