= 2012 MiWay T20 Challenge =

2011–12 MiWay T20 Challenge
- Administrator: Cricket South Africa
- Cricket format: Twenty20
- Tournament format(s): Double round-robin and knockout
- Host: South Africa
- Champions: Titans (3rd title)
- Participants: 7
- Matches: 44
- Most runs: Stiaan van Zyl, Cape Cobras (444)
- Most wickets: Chris Morris, Lions (21)

The 2011–12 MiWay T20 Challenge was the ninth season of the MiWay T20 Challenge, established by the Cricket South Africa and the ninth season of the CSA T20 Challenge overall. The tournament was previously known as the Standard Bank Pro20 Series. The tournament was played between 15 February and 1 April 2012. The tournament had an expanded tournament format. It featured the addition of a seventh team, a change in the group stage from a single to a double round-robin tournament, and a 2-match knockout stage.

== Venues ==
Map of the venues for the 2011–12 MiWay T20 Challenge

Stadium	City	Capacity	Home team
Newlands	Cape Town	25,000	Cape Cobras
Boland Bank Park	Paarl	10,000	Cape Cobras
Kingsmead	Durban	25,000	Dolphins
City Oval	Pietermaritzburg	12,000	Dolphins
Willowmoore Park	Benoni	20,000	Impi
Chevrolet Park	Bloemfontein	20,000	Knights
De Beers Diamond Oval	Kimberley	11,000	Knights
New Wanderers Stadium	Johannesburg	34,000	Lions
Senwes Park	Potchefstroom	9,000	Lions
SuperSport Park	Centurion	20,000	Titans
St George's Park	Port Elizabeth	19,000	Warriors
Buffalo Park	East London	15,000	Warriors

== Rules and regulations ==
The tournament is divided into a group stage and a knockout stage. In the group stage, teams face each other in a double round-robin tournament (i.e. each team plays every other team twice, once at home and once away). At the end of the group stage, the top team qualifies for the final. The teams in second and third take part in a play-off match with the winners contesting the final. If a match in the knockout stage ends with a tie, a Super Over will determine the winner.

Points were awarded as follows in the group stage:

Point system
Result	Points
Win, with bonus point	5 points
Win, without bonus point	4 points
Tie	3 points
No result	2 points
Loss	0 points

- The team that achieves a run rate of 1.25 times that of the opposition shall be rewarded one bonus point.
- A team's run rate will be calculated by reference to the runs scored in an innings divided by the number of overs faced.
- Points are deducted for slow over rate at 1 point per over not completed within the allotted 90 minutes.

In the event of teams finishing on equal points, the right to play in the semi-finals will be determined in the following order of priority:

- The team with the most wins;
- If still equal, the team with the most wins over the other team(s) who are equal on points and have the same number of wins;
- If still equal, the team with the highest number of bonus points;
- If still equal, the team with the highest net run rate;
- The team with the higher runs to wickets ratio throughout the series.

== Teams and standings ==
Pos	Team	Pld	W	L	T	NR	BP	Pts	NRR
1	Lions (R)	12	7	2	0	3	3	37	1.439
2	Titans (C)	12	7	3	0	2	3	35	0.400
3	Knights	12	7	3	1	1	1	34	0.406
4	Dolphins	12	4	3	0	5	0	26	−0.192
5	Cape Cobras	12	5	6	1	0	1	24	0.036
6	Warriors	12	4	7	0	1	3	21	−0.198
7	Impi	12	0	10	0	2	0	4	−1.709

(C) = Eventual champion; (R) = Runner-up.
Note: The winner and runner-up qualify for the 2012 Champions League Twenty20.

== Results ==
=== Group stage ===
Visitor team →	Cape Cobras	Dolphins	Impi	Knights	Lions	Titans	Warriors
Home team ↓	Cape Cobras	Dolphins	Impi	Knights	Lions	Titans	Warriors
Cape Cobras		Dolphins; 3 runs	Cape Cobras; 40 runs	Cape Cobras; 6 wickets	Cape Cobras; 1 run	Titans; 6 wickets	Warriors; 43 runs
Dolphins	Dolphins; 6 wickets		Dolphins; 3 runs	Knights; 8 runs (D/L)	Abandoned; No result	Titans; 6 wickets	Warriors; 10 wickets
Impi	Cape Cobras; 35 runs	Abandoned; No result		Knights; 24 runs	Abandoned; No result	Titans; 6 wickets	Warriors; 36 runs
Knights	Match tied	Dolphins; 8 runs	Knights; 5 wickets (D/L)		Knights; 8 wickets	Abandoned; No result	Knights; 7 wickets
Lions	Lions; 3 wickets	Abandoned; No result	Lions; 61 runs	Lions; 7 wickets (D/L)		Lions; 16 runs	Lions; 115 runs
Titans	Titans; 6 wickets	Abandoned; No result	Titans; 9 wickets	Knights; 5 wickets	Lions; 7 wicket		Titans; 8 wickets (D/L)
Warriors	Cape Cobras; 10 runs	Abandoned; No result	Warriors; 48 runs	Knights; 13 runs	Lions; 8 wickets	Titans; 29 runs	

Note: Click on the results to see match summary.

Home team won	Visitor team won	Match abandoned

== Fixtures ==
All times shown are in South African Standard Time (UTC+02).

=== Group stage ===
15 February
18:00 (D/N)
Scorecard

Cape Cobras; 155/5 (20 overs)	v	Warriors (H); 145/7 (20 overs)
Stiaan van Zyl 58 (41); Makhaya Ntini 2/19 (4 overs)		Kelly Smuts 26 (14); Alistair Gray 2/25 (3 overs)

Cape Cobras won by 10 runs
St George's Park, Port Elizabeth
Umpires: Johan Cloete and Marais Erasmus
Player of the match: Stiaan van Zyl (batsman, Cape Cobras), Makhaya Ntini (bowler, Warriors)

- Warriors won the toss and elected to field.

17 February
18:00 (D/N)
Scorecard

Titans; 174/5 (20 overs)	v	Warriors (H); 145/7 (20 overs)
Martin van Jaarsveld 77 (46); Andrew Birch 2/25 (4 overs)		Ashwell Prince 49 (40); Paul Harris 3/22 (4 overs)

Titans won by 29 runs
Buffalo Park, East London
Umpires: Murray Brown and Earl Hendrikse
Player of the match: Paul Harris (bowler, Titans)

- Titans won the toss and elected to bat.

17 February
18:00 (D/N)
Scorecard

Cape Cobras; 181/4 (20 overs)	v	Knights (H); 119/5 (13 overs)
Andrew Puttick 51 (42); Ryan McLaren 2/28 (4 overs)		Rilee Rossouw 29 (12); Vernon Philander 2/23 (3 overs)

Match tied (D/L)
De Beers Diamond Oval, Kimberley
Umpires: Johan Cloete and Karl Hurter
Player of the match: Stiaan van Zyl (batsman, Cape Cobras), Ryan McLaren (bowler, Knights)

- Knights won the toss and elected to field.
- Rain adjusted the Knights' target to 120 runs from 13 overs according to the Duckworth–Lewis method.

17 February
18:00 (D/N)
Scorecard

(H) Lions; 153/7 (20 overs)	v	Impi; 92 (19.5 overs)
Alviro Petersen 37 (36); Richard Cameron 2/27 (4 overs)		Ryan Canning 26 (19); Ethan O'Reilly 2/4 (4 overs)

Lions won by 61 runs
Senwes Park, Potchefstroom
Umpires: Dennis Smith and Brad White
Player of the match: Chris Morris (batsman, Lions), Ethan O'Reilly (bowler, Lions)

- Impi won the toss and elected to field.

19 February
14:30
Scorecard

(H) Dolphins; 151/6 (20 overs)	v	Impi; 148/7 (20 overs)
Vaughn van Jaarsveld 43 (39); Pumelela Matshikwe 3/18 (4 overs)		Khayelihle Zondo 54 (47); Robert Frylinck 4/28 (4 overs)

Dolphins won by 3 runs
City Oval, Pietermaritzburg
Umpires: Marais Erasmus and Ian Howell
Player of the match: Khayelihle Zondo (batsman, Impi), Robert Frylinck (bowler, Dolphins)

- Dolphins won the toss and elected to bat.

19 February
14:30
Scorecard

(H) Titans; 165/7 (20 overs)	v	Knights; 170/5 (19.2 overs)
Farhaan Behardien 70 (44); Dillon du Preez 2/45 (4 overs)		Morne van Wyk 62 (50); Alfonso Thomas 3/17 (4 overs)

Knights won by 5 wickets
SuperSport Park, Centurion
Umpires: Murray Brown and Karl Hurter
Player of the match: Morne van Wyk (batsman, Knights), Alfonso Thomas (bowler, Titans)

- Knights won the toss and elected to field.

22 February
18:00 (D/N)
Scorecard

(H) Cape Cobras; 211/4 (20 overs)	v	Impi; 171/6 (20 overs)
Dane Vilas 57 (30); Siya Simetu 2/39 (4 overs)		Khayelihle Zondo 100* (63); Johann Louw 2/22 (3 overs)

Cape Cobras won by 40 runs
Boland Bank Park, Paarl
Umpires: Murray Brown and Earl Hendrikse
Player of the match: Khayelihle Zondo (batsman, Impi)

- Impi won the toss and elected to field.

22 February
18:00 (D/N)
Scorecard

(H) Warriors; 134/9 (20 overs)	v	Lions; 136/2 (18.5 overs)
Jon-Jon Smuts 42 (37); Chris Morris 2/19 (4 overs)		Jonathan Vandiar 56* (53); Simon Harmer 1/19 (4 overs)

Lions won by 8 wickets
St George's Park, Port Elizabeth
Umpires: Johan Cloete and Marais Erasmus
Player of the match: Jonathan Vandiar (batsman, Lions), Aaron Phangiso (bowler, Lions)

- Warriors won the toss and elected to bat.

22 February
18:00 (D/N)
Scorecard

Dolphins; 184/6 (20 overs)	v	Knights (H); 176/5 (20 overs)
Cody Chetty 82 (49); Johan van der Wath 2/36 (3 overs)		Rilee Rossouw 57 (38); Imran Tahir 2/29 (4 overs)

Dolphins won by 8 runs
Chevrolet Park, Bloemfontein
Umpires: Dennis Smith and Brad White
Player of the match: Cody Chetty (batsman, Dolphins), Imran Tahir (bowler, Dolphins)

- Dolphins won the toss and elected to bat.

24 February
18:00 (D/N)
Scorecard

(H) Dolphins; 167/5 (20 overs)	v	Titans; 168/4 (20 overs)
Cody Chetty 63 (49); CJ de Villiers 2/42 (4 overs)		Jacques Rudolph 62* (55); Kyle Abbott 1/25 (4 overs)

Titans won by 6 wickets
Kingsmead, Durban
Umpires: Ian Howell and Brian Jerling
Player of the match: Jacques Rudolph (batsman, Titans), Alfonso Thomas (bowler, Titans)

- Dolphins won the toss and elected to bat.

24 February
18:00 (D/N)
Scorecard

Knights; 152/6 (20 overs)	v	Impi (H); 128/7 (20 overs)
Morne van Wyk 48 (35); Pumelela Matshikwe 3/41 (4 overs)		Ryan ten Doeschate 26 (20); Jandre Coetzee 3/19 (4 overs)

Knights won by 24 runs
Willowmoore Park, Benoni
Umpires: Murray Brown and Earl Hendrikse
Player of the match: Morne van Wyk (batsman, Knights), Werner Coetsee (bowler, Knights)

- Knights won the toss and elected to bat.

24 February
18:00 (D/N)
Scorecard

Cape Cobras; 178/6 (20 overs)	v	Lions (H); 179/7 (19.2 overs)
Owais Shah 48 (33); Ethan O'Reilly 2/26 (4 overs)		Quinton de Kock 53 (29); Dane Piedt 3/24 (4 overs)

Lions won by 3 wickets
New Wanderers Stadium, Johannesburg
Umpires: Johan Cloete and Marais Erasmus
Player of the match: Quinton de Kock (batsman, Lions), Dane Piedt (bowler, Cape Cobras)

- Lions won the toss and elected to field.

26 February
14:30
Scorecard

Dolphins; 166/5 (20 overs)	v	Cape Cobras (H); 163/6 (20 overs)
David Miller 61* (35); Beuran Hendricks 2/23 (3 overs)		Stiaan van Zyl 86* (53); Mthokozisi Shezi 4/25 (4 overs)

Dolphins won by 3 runs
Boland Bank Park, Paarl
Umpires: Brian Jerling and Gerrie Pienaar
Player of the match: David Miller (batsman, Dolphins), Mthokozisi Shezi (bowler, Dolphins)

- Dolphins won the toss and elected to bat.

26 February
14:30
Scorecard

Lions; 131/5 (20 overs)	v	Knights (H); 135/2 (15.3 overs)
Quinton de Kock 48 (36); Dillon du Preez 1/10 (2 overs)		Morne van Wyk 70* (44); Alviro Petersen 1/12 (2 overs)

Knights won by 8 wickets
Chevrolet Park, Bloemfontein
Umpires: Murray Brown and Dennis Smith
Player of the match: Morne van Wyk (batsman, Knights), Werner Coetsee (bowler, Knights)

- Lions won the toss and elected to bat.

26 February
14:30
Scorecard

Impi; 131 (19.4 overs)	v	Titans (H); 137/1 (15.4 overs)
Khayelihle Zondo 33 (31); Roelof van der Merwe 3/28 (4 overs)		Henry Davids 55 (35); Khayelihle Zondo 1/26 (2.4 overs)

Titans won by 9 wickets
SuperSport Park, Centurion
Umpires: Johan Cloete and Ian Howell
Player of the match: Henry Davids (batsman, Titans), Roelof van der Merwe (bowler, Titans)

- Impi won the toss and elected to bat.

29 February
18:00 (D/N)
Scorecard

Warriors; 182/2 (20 overs)	v	Impi (H); 146/8 (20 overs)
Ashwell Prince 63 (43); Luke Wright 1/21 (2 overs)		Ryan Canning 36* (25); Andrew Birch 2/21 (4 overs)

Warriors won by 36 runs
Willowmoore Park, Benoni
Umpires: Marais Erasmus and Adrian Holdstock
Player of the match: Craig Thyssen (batsman, Warriors), Andrew Birch (bowler, Warriors)

- Warriors won the toss and elected to bat.

29 February
18:00 (D/N)
Scorecard

(H) Knights	v	Titans

Match abandoned without a ball bowled
Chevrolet Park, Bloemfontein
Umpires: Shaun George and Ian Howell

2 March
18:00 (D/N)
Scorecard

Cape Cobras; 165/5 (20 overs)	v	Impi (H); 130/7 (20 overs)
Owais Shah 60* (40); Ben Edmondson 2/29 (4 overs)		Khayelihle Zondo 35 (39); Brad Hogg 3/15 (4 overs)

Cape Cobras won by 35 runs
Willowmoore Park, Benoni
Umpires: Gerrie Pienaar and Brad White
Player of the match: Owais Shah (batsman, Cape Cobras), Brad Hogg (bowler, Cape Cobras)

- Cape Cobras won the toss and elected to bat.

2 March
18:00 (D/N)
Scorecard

(H) Dolphins; 100/8 (20 overs)	v	Warriors; 102/0 (14.3 overs)
Vaughn van Jaarsveld 22 (25); Makhaya Ntini 3/12 (4 overs)		Ashwell Prince 52* (48)

Warriors won by 10 wickets
Kingsmead, Durban
Umpires: Johan Cloete and Adrian Holdstock
Player of the match: Ashwell Prince (batsman, Warriors), Makhaya Ntini (bowler, Warriors)

- Dolphins won the toss and elected to bat.

2 March
18:00 (D/N)
Scorecard

(H) Titans; 121 (19.1 overs)	v	Lions; 124/3 (12.3 overs)
Farhaan Behardien 22 (23); Dirk Nannes 3/12 (3.1 overs)		Quinton de Kock 72* (36); Roelof van der Merwe 1/8 (1 over)

Lions won by 7 wickets
SuperSport Park, Centurion
Umpires: Shaun George and Earl Hendrikse
Player of the match: Quinton de Kock (batsman, Lions), Dirk Nannes (bowler, Lions)

- Lions won the toss and elected to field.

4 March
14:30
Scorecard

(H) Cape Cobras; 142/5 (20 overs)	v	Titans; 146/4 (19.1 overs)
Dane Vilas 41 (35); Alfonso Thomas 2/32 (4 overs)		Pieter Malan 48 (41); Brad Hogg 2/22 (4 overs)

Titans won by 6 wickets
Newlands, Cape Town
Umpires: Adrian Holdstock and Gerrie Pienaar
Player of the match: Martin van Jaarsveld (batsman, Titans), Roelof van der Merwe (bowler, Titans)

- Titans won the toss and elected to field.

4 March
14:30
Scorecard

(H) Warriors; 168/4 (20 overs)	v	Impi; 120 (18.4 overs)
Colin Ingram 51 (30); Siya Simetu 1/21 (4 overs)		Ryan ten Doeschate 56 (41); Andrew Birch 3/18 (4 overs)

Warriors won by 48 runs
Buffalo Park, East London
Umpires: Karl Hurter and Dennis Smith
Player of the match: Colin Ingram (batsman, Warriors), Andrew Birch (bowler, Warriors)

- Warriors won the toss and elected to bat.

4 March
14:30
Scorecard

(H) Dolphins	v	Lions

Match abandoned without a ball bowled
Kingsmead, Durban
Umpires: Johan Cloete and Brian Jerling

7 March
18:00 (D/N)
Scorecard

(H) Impi	v	Dolphins

No result
Willowmoore Park, Benoni
Umpires: Marais Erasmus and Earl Hendrikse

- Impi won the toss and elected to bat.

7 March
18:00 (D/N)
Scorecard

Knights; 136/9 (18 overs)	v	Lions (H); 91/3 (11.2 overs)
Morne van Wyk 38 (28); Chris Morris 4/22 (4 overs)		Gulam Bodi 40 (34); Malusi Siboto 1/11 (2 overs)

Lions won by 7 wickets (D/L)
Senwes Park, Potchefstroom
Umpires: Gerrie Pienaar and Dennis Smith
Player of the match: Chris Morris (batsman and bowler, Lions)

- Lions won the toss and elected to field.
- Rain first reduced the match to 18 overs per side. Rain further reduced the Lions' target to 90 runs from 12 overs according to the Duckworth–Lewis method.

9 March
18:00 (D/N)
Scorecard

(H) Cape Cobras; 180/3 (20 overs)	v	Lions; 179/6 (20 overs)
Owais Shah 79* (44); Jean Symes 1/24 (3 overs)		Jonathan Vandiar 59 (38); Alistair Gray 3/20 (4 overs)

Cape Cobras won by 1 run
Newlands, Cape Town
Umpires: Shaun George and Dennis Smith
Player of the match: Owais Shah (batsman, Cape Cobras), Alistair Gray (bowler, Cape Cobras)

- Lions won the toss and elected to field.

9 March
18:00 (D/N)
Scorecard

Knights; 127/8 (20 overs)	v	Warriors (H); 114/8 (20 overs)
Obus Pienaar 39 (34); Andrew Birch 2/10 (3 overs)		Colin Ingram 53 (36); Jandre Coetzee 3/7 (4 overs)

Knights won by 13 runs
St George's Park, Port Elizabeth
Umpires: Ian Howell and Brad White
Player of the match: Colin Ingram (batsman, Warriors), Jandre Coetzee (bowler, Knights)

- Knights won the toss and elected to bat.

9 March
18:00 (D/N)
Scorecard

(H) Titans; 79/3 (10.3 overs)	v	Dolphins
Heino Kuhn 29 (25); Kyle Abbott 3/13 (2 overs)

No result
SuperSport Park, Centurion
Umpires: Adrian Holdstock and Ian Howell

- Dolphins won the toss and elected to field.

11 March
14:30
Scorecard

Knights; 156/7 (20 overs)	v	Cape Cobras (H); 157/4 (18.4 overs)
Morne van Wyk 31 (25); Alistair Gray 2/27 (4 overs)		Richard Levi 61 (32); Werner Coetsee 2/21 (2 overs)

Cape Cobras won by 6 wickets
Boland Bank Park, Paarl
Umpires: Shaun George and Gerrie Pienaar
Player of the match: Richard Levi (batsman, Cape Cobras), Alistair Gray (bowler, Cape Cobras)

- Knights won the toss and elected to bat.

11 March
14:30
Scorecard

(H) Warriors	v	Dolphins

Match abandoned without a ball bowled
Buffalo Park, East London
Umpires: Ian Howell and Brad White

11 March
14:30
Scorecard

(H) Lions; 163/7 (20 overs)	v	Titans; 147/9 (20 overs)
Neil McKenzie 48 (36); Francois du Plessis 5/28 (4 overs)		Farhaan Behardien 48 (26); Chris Morris 4/24 (4 overs)

Lions won by 16 runs
New Wanderers Stadium, Johannesburg
Umpires: Karl Hurter and Brian Jerling
Player of the match: Quinton de Kock (batsman, Lions), Francois du Plessis (bowler, Titans)

- Titans won the toss and elected to field.

14 March
18:00 (D/N)
Scorecard

Knights; 130/9 (20 overs)	v	Dolphins (H); 77/4 (13.5 overs)
Morne van Wyk 58 (53); Imraan Khan 4/21 (3 overs)		Cameron Delport 36 (32); Jandre Coetzee 2/13 (1.5 overs)

Knights won by 8 runs (D/L)
Kingsmead, Durban
Umpires: Shaun George and Earl Hendrikse
Player of the match: Morne van Wyk (batsman, Knights), Prenelan Subrayen (bowler, Dolphins)

- Knights won the toss and elected to bat.
- Rain stopped play after 13.5 overs in the Dolphins' innings. Their target was 86 runs according to the Duckworth–Lewis method.

14 March
18:00 (D/N)
Scorecard

(H) Lions; 199/6 (20 overs)	v	Warriors; 84 (14.2 overs)
Gulam Bodi 90 (51); Wayne Parnell 2/44 (4 overs)		Athenkosi Dyili 15* (12); Jean Symes 3/5 (1.2 overs)

Lions won by 115 runs
Senwes Park, Potchefstroom
Umpires: Karl Hurter and Brad White
Player of the match: Gulam Bodi (batsman, Lions), Jean Symes (bowler, Lions)

- Warriors won the toss and elected to field.

14 March
18:00 (D/N)
Scorecard

(H) Impi; 126/6 (20 overs)	v	Titans; 127/4 (15 overs)
Ryan ten Doeschate 39 (40); Roelof van der Merwe 2/11 (4 overs)		Henry Davids 39 (44); Paul Collingwood 2/35 (3 overs)

Titans won by 6 wickets
Willowmoore Park, Benoni
Umpires: Murray Brown and Gerrie Pienaar
Player of the match: Martin van Jaarsveld (batsman, Titans), Roelof van der Merwe (bowler, Titans)

- Impi won the toss and elected to bat.

16 March
18:00 (D/N)
Scorecard

Warriors; 149/6 (20 overs)	v	Cape Cobras (H); 106 (18.5 overs)
Johan Botha 38* (26); Brad Hogg 4/33 (4 overs)		Justin Ontong 23 (23); Johan Botha 2/9 (4 overs)

Warriors won by 43 runs
Newlands, Cape Town
Umpires: Shaun George and Brian Jerling
Player of the match: Johan Botha (batsman and bowler, Warriors)

- Cape Cobras won the toss and elected to field.

16 March
18:00 (D/N)
Scorecard

Impi; 178/9 (20 overs)	v	Knights (H); 157/5 (17 overs)
Luke Wright 75 (39); Jandre Coetzee 4/34 (4 overs)		Rilee Rossouw 42 (25); Pumelela Matshikwe 2/33 (3 overs)

Knights won by 5 wickets (D/L)
De Beers Diamond Oval, Kimberley
Umpires: Karl Hurter and Gerrie Pienaar
Player of the match: Luke Wright (batsman, Impi), Jandre Coetzee (bowler, Knights)

- Impi won the toss and elected to bat.
- Rain reduced the Knights' target to 155 runs from 17 overs according to the Duckworth–Lewis method.

16 March
18:00 (D/N)
Scorecard

(H) Lions; 24/2 (6 overs)	v	Dolphins
Gulam Bodi 10* (19); Robert Frylinck 1/3 (1 over)

No result
New Wanderers Stadium, Johannesburg
Umpires: Murray Brown and Adrian Holdstock

- Dolphins won the toss and elected to field.
- Match abandoned due to unplayable pitch after 2 days of heavy rain.

18 March
14:30
Scorecard

Warriors; 141/6 (20 overs)	v	Knights (H); 142/3 (19.1 overs)
Davy Jacobs 46 (36); Jandre Coetzee 3/25 (4 overs)		Reeza Hendricks 48 (43); Rusty Theron 1/20 (3.1 overs)

Knights won by 7 wickets
De Beers Diamond Oval, Kimberley
Umpires: Karl Hurter and Brad White
Player of the match: Reeza Hendricks (batsman, Knights), Jandre Coetzee (bowler, Knights)

- Knights won the toss and elected to field.

18 March
14:30
Scorecard

Cape Cobras; 156/6 (20 overs)	v	Titans (H); 157/4 (18.3 overs)
Dane Vilas 48* (28); Alfonso Thomas 2/22 (4 overs)		Francois du Plessis 38* (27); Alistair Gray 2/33 (4 overs)

Titans won by 6 wickets
SuperSport Park, Centurion
Umpires: Adrian Holdstock and Dennis Smith
Player of the match: Francois du Plessis (batsman, Titans), Alfonso Thomas (bowler, Titans)

- Cape Cobras won the toss and elected to bat.

21 March
12:00
Scorecard

Cape Cobras; 120/6 (20 overs)	v	Dolphins (H); 124/4 (18.5 overs)
Alistair Gray 32* (21); Imraan Khan 1/7 (2 overs)		Daryn Smit 40* (34); Alistair Gray 2/17 (4 overs)

Dolphins won by 6 wickets
Kingsmead, Durban
Umpires: Marais Erasmus and Shaun George
Player of the match: Daryn Smit (batsman, Dolphins), Prenelan Subrayen (bowler, Dolphins)

- Dolphins won the toss and elected to field.

21 March
14:30
Scorecard

(H) Impi; 80/4 (11 overs)	v	Lions
Luke Wright 45 (28); Jean Symes 1/5 (2 overs)

No result
Willowmoore Park, Benoni
Umpires: Earl Hendrikse and Brian Jerling

- Impi won the toss and elected to bat.

21 March
15:30 (D/N)
Scorecard

Warriors; 64/6 (13.1 overs)	v	Titans (H); 61/2 (7.5 overs)
Wayne Parnell 23 (16); Albie Morkel 2/4 (2 overs)		Martin van Jaarsveld 23 (18); Johan Botha 1/4 (1 over)

Titans won by 8 wickets (D/L)
SuperSport Park, Centurion
Umpires: Adrian Holdstock and Ian Howell
Player of the match: Francois du Plessis (batsman, Titans), Albie Morkel (bowler, Titans)

- Warriors won the toss and elected to bat.
- Rain stopped the Warriors' innings after 13.1 overs and adjusted the Titans' target to 60 runs from 11 overs according to the Duckworth–Lewis method.

=== Knockout stage ===
25 March
14:30
Scorecard

Knights; 144/6 (20 overs)	v	Titans (H); 144/8 (20 overs)
Ryan McLaren 42* (28); Roelof van der Merwe 2/39 (4 overs)		Farhaan Behardien 37 (35); Johan van der Wath 4/24 (4 overs)

Match tied; Titans won the Super Over
SuperSport Park, Centurion
Umpires: Shaun George and Adrian Holdstock
Player of the match: Farhaan Behardien (batsman, Titans), Alfonso Thomas (bowler, Titans)

- Titans won the toss and elected to field.

1 April
18:00 (D/N)
Scorecard

Titans; 187/6 (20 overs)	v	Lions (H); 142 (18.5 overs)
Farhaan Behardien 42* (26); Aaron Phangiso 2/14 (4 overs)		Jean Symes 25 (20); Francois du Plessis 4/24 (4 overs)

Titans won by 45 runs
New Wanderers Stadium, Johannesburg
Umpires: Johan Cloete and Shaun George
Player of the match: Farhaan Behardien (batsman, Titans), Francois du Plessis (bowler, Titans)

- Lions won the toss and elected to field.
