= 2013 Ram Slam T20 Challenge =

- Dates: 15 February 2013 – 7 April 2013
- Administrator: Cricket South Africa
- Cricket format: Twenty20
- Tournament format(s): Double round-robin and knockout
- Host: South Africa
- Champions: Highveld Lions (2nd title)
- Participants: 6
- Matches: 32
- Most runs: Quinton de Kock, Highveld Lions (524)
- Most wickets: Hardus Viljoen, Highveld Lions (17)

The 2012–13 Ram Slam T20 Challenge was the tenth season of the Ram Slam T20 Challenge, established by Cricket South Africa. The tournament was previously known as the MiWay T20 Challenge and the Standard Bank Pro20 Series. The tournament was played between 15 February and 7 April 2013.

The Highveld Lions beat the Titans in the final by 30 runs to win the tournament.

== Venues ==
Map of the venues for the 2012–13 Ram Slam T20 Challenge

Stadium	City	Capacity	Home team
Newlands	Cape Town	25,000	Cape Cobras
Boland Bank Park	Paarl	10,000	Cape Cobras
Kingsmead	Durban	25,000	Dolphins
City Oval	Pietermaritzburg	12,000	Dolphins
Chevrolet Park	Bloemfontein	20,000	Knights
De Beers Diamond Oval	Kimberley	11,000	Knights
New Wanderers Stadium	Johannesburg	34,000	Highveld Lions
Senwes Park	Potchefstroom	9,000	Highveld Lions
SuperSport Park	Centurion	20,000	Titans
Willowmoore Park	Benoni	20,000	Titans
St George's Park	Port Elizabeth	19,000	Warriors
Buffalo Park	East London	15,000	Warriors

== Rules and regulations ==
The tournament is divided into a group stage and a knockout stage. In the group stage, teams face each other in a double round-robin tournament (i.e. each team plays every other team twice, once at home and once away). At the end of the group stage, the top team qualifies for the final. The teams in second and third take part in a play-off match with the winners contesting the final. If a match in the knockout stage ends with a tie, a Super Over will determine the winner.

Points were awarded as follows in the group stage:

Point system
Result	Points
Win, with bonus point	5 points
Win, without bonus point	4 points
Tie	3 points
No result	2 points
Loss	0 points

- The team that achieves a run rate of 1.25 times that of the opposition shall be rewarded one bonus point.
- A team's run rate will be calculated by reference to the runs scored in an innings divided by the number of overs faced.
- Points are deducted for slow over rate at 1 point per over not completed within the allotted 90 minutes.

In the event of teams finishing on equal points, the right to play in the semi-finals will be determined in the following order of priority:

- The team with the most wins;
- If still equal, the team with the most wins over the other team(s) who are equal on points and have the same number of wins;
- If still equal, the team with the highest number of bonus points;
- If still equal, the team with the highest net run rate;
- The team with the higher runs to wickets ratio throughout the series.

== Teams and standings ==
Pos	Team	Pld	W	L	T	NR	BP	Pts	NRR
1	Highveld Lions (C)	10	7	3	0	0	2	30	0.698
2	Warriors	10	6	3	0	1	1	27	0.204
3	Titans (R)	10	6	3	0	1	0	26	0.148
4	Knights	10	5	5	0	0	1	21	−0.051
5	Dolphins	10	2	6	0	2	0	12	−0.783
6	Cape Cobras	10	2	8	0	0	0	8	−0.387

(C) = Eventual champion; (R) = Runner-up.
Note: The winner and runner-up qualify for the 2013 Champions League Twenty20.

== Results ==
=== Group stage ===
Visitor team →	Cape Cobras	Dolphins	Knights	Highveld Lions	Titans	Warriors
Home team ↓	Cape Cobras	Dolphins	Knights	Highveld Lions	Titans	Warriors
Cape Cobras		Cape Cobras; 9 wickets	Cape Cobras; 25 runs	Highveld Lions; 5 wickets	Titans; 7 runs	Warriors; 8 wickets
Dolphins	Dolphins; 22 runs		Dolphins; 14 runs	Highveld Lions; 7 runs	Abandoned; No result	Abandoned; No result
Knights	Knights; 7 wickets	Knights; 9 wickets		Highveld Lions; 4 wickets	Titans; 8 wickets	Warriors; 8 wickets (D/L)
Highveld Lions	Highveld Lions; 9 wickets	Highveld Lions; 54 runs	Knights; 4 runs		Highveld Lions; 7 wickets	Highveld Lions; 47 runs
Titans	Titans; 6 wickets	Titans; 4 wickets	Knights; 8 runs	Titans; 7 runs		Warriors; 12 runs
Warriors	Warriors; 6 wickets	Warriors; 9 wickets	Knights; 6 runs	Warriors; 4 runs	Titans; 5 wickets	

Home team won	Vitor team won	Match abandoned

Note: Click on the results to see match summary.

== Fixtures ==
All times shown are in South African Standard Time (UTC+02).

=== Group stage ===
15 February
18:00 (D/N)
Scorecard

(H) Dolphins	v	Titans

Match abandoned without a ball bowled
Kingsmead, Durban
Umpires: Karl Hurter and Brian Jerling

17 February
14:30
Scorecard

(H) Knights; 136/7 (20 overs)	v	Warriors; 128/2 (16.1 overs)
Gihahn Cloete 37 (33); Rusty Theron 2/23 (4 overs)		Christiaan Jonker 66* (44); Johan van der Wath 1/13 (3 overs)

Warriors won by 8 wickets (D/L)
De Beers Diamond Oval, Kimberley
Umpires: Earl Hendrikse and Gerrie Pienaar
Player of the match: Christiaan Jonker (batsman, Warriors), Rusty Theron (bowler, Warriors)

- Warriors won the toss and elected to field.
- Rain during the innings break adjusted the Warriors' target to 127 runs from 18 overs according to the Duckworth–Lewis method.

17 February
14:30
Scorecard

Cape Cobras; 183/5 (20 overs)	v	(H) Highveld Lions; 185/1 (18.5 overs)
Dane Vilas 63* (45); Aaron Phangiso 3/31 (4 overs)		Quinton de Kock 126* (69); Dane Piedt 1/28 (4 overs)

Highveld Lions won by 9 wickets
Senwes Park, Potchefstroom
Umpires: Dennis Smith and Brad White
Player of the match: Quinton de Kock (batsman, Highveld Lions), Aaron Phangiso (bowler, Highveld Lions)

- Highveld Lions won the toss and elected to field.

20 February
18:00 (D/N)
Scorecard

Titans; 148/7 (20 overs)	v	(H) Highveld Lions; 150/3 (18.5 overs)
Farhaan Behardien 36 (28); Sohail Tanvir 2/21 (4 overs)		Quinton de Kock 47 (40); Ethy Mbhalati 3/31 (3.5 overs)

Highveld Lions won by 7 wickets
New Wanderers Stadium, Johannesburg
Umpires: Karl Hurter and Brian Jerling

- Highveld Lions won the toss and elected to field.

22 February
18:00 (D/N)
Scorecard

(H) Cape Cobras; 171/4 (20 overs)	v	Knights; 146/8 (20 overs)
Dane Vilas 48 (36); Ryan McLaren 2/27 (4 overs)		Ryan McLaren 51 (38); Beuran Hendricks 2/16 (4 overs)

Cape Cobras won by 25 runs
Boland Park, Paarl
Umpires: Murray Brown and Adrian Holdstock
Player of the match: Owais Shah (batsman, Cape Cobras), Beuran Hendricks (bowler, Cape Cobras)

- Knights won the toss and elected to field.

22 February
18:00 (D/N)
Scorecard

Highveld Lions; 129 (18.2 overs)	v	(H) Dolphins; 122/8 (20 overs)
Neil McKenzie 56 (38); Robert Frylinck 5/16 (3.2 overs)		David Miller 41 (34); Chris Morris 2/14 (4 overs)

Highveld Lions won by 7 runs
Kingsmead, Durban
Umpires: Gerrie Pienaar and Dennis Smith
Player of the match: Neil McKenzie (batsman, Highveld Lions), Robert Frylinck (bowler, Dolphins)

- Dolphins won the toss and elected to field.

22 February
18:00 (D/N)
Scorecard

(H) Warriors; 120/8 (20 overs)	v	Titans; 121/5 (18.1 overs)
Simon Harmer 39* (27); Eden Links 3/13 (4 overs)		Albie Morkel 46* (17); Simon Harmer 3/28 (4 overs)

Titans won by 5 wickets
St George's Park, Port Elizabeth
Umpires: Ian Howell and Brian Jerling
Player of the match: Albie Morkel (batsman, Titans), Eden Links (bowler, Titans)

- Titans won the toss and elected to field.

24 February
14:30
Scorecard

Dolphins; 134/6 (20 overs)	v	(H) Cape Cobras; 137/1 (16.4 overs)
Ravi Bopara 60 (44); Charl Langeveldt 2/32 (4 overs)		Richard Levi 80* (53); Craig Alexander 1/32 (3.4 overs)

Cape Cobras won by 9 wickets
Newlands, Cape Town
Umpires: Earl Hendrikse and Adrian Holdstock
Player of the match: Richard Levi (batsman, Cape Cobras), Dane Piedt (bowler, Cape Cobras)

- Dolphins won the toss and elected to bat.

24 February
14:30
Scorecard

Warriors; 162/7 (20 overs)	v	(H) Highveld Lions; 115 (18 overs)
Quinton de Kock 47 (32); Wayne Parnell 2/23 (4 overs)		Simon Harmer 33 (23); Hardus Viljoen 3/12 (4 overs)

Highveld Lions won by 47 runs
Senwes Park, Potchefstroom
Umpires: Ian Howell and Dennis Smith
Player of the match: Dwaine Pretorius (batsman, Highveld Lions), Hardus Viljoen (bowler, Highveld Lions)

- Warriors won the toss and elected to field.

27 February
18:00 (D/N)
Scorecard

Dolphins; 131/5 (20 overs)	v	(H) Knights; 133/1 (15.3 overs)
Khayelihle Zondo 43 (42); Johan van der Wath 2/29 (4 overs)		Dean Elgar 61* (43); Prenelan Subrayen 1/32 (4 overs)

Knights won by 9 wickets
Chevrolet Park, Bloemfontein
Umpires: Earl Hendrikse and Dennis Smith
Player of the match: Dean Elgar (batsman, Knights), Nicky Boje (bowler, Knights)

- Dolphins won the toss and elected to bat.

28 February
18:00 (D/N)
Scorecard

Cape Cobras; 116/4 (20 overs)	v	(H) Titans; 117/4 (18.4 overs)
Dane Vilas 59* (44); Albie Morkel 2/14 (4 overs)		Jacques Rudolph 49 (56); Beuran Hendricks 2/21 (4 overs)

Titans won by 6 wickets
Willowmoore Park, Benoni
Umpires: Murray Brown and Earl Hendrikse
Player of the match: Jacques Rudolph (batsman, Titans), Ethy Mbhalati (bowler, Titans)

- Titans won the toss and elected to field.

2 March
18:00 (D/N)
Scorecard

Knights; 125/9 (20 overs)	v	(H) Highveld Lions; 121/8 (20 overs)
Rilee Rossouw 33 (37); Imran Tahir 2/23 (4 overs)		Jean Symes 46 (37); Ryan McLaren 2/16 (4 overs)

Knights won by 4 runs
New Wanderers Stadium, Johannesburg
Umpires: Murray Brown and Dennis Smith
Player of the match: Jean Symes (batsman, Highveld Lions), Ryan McLaren (bowler, Knights)

- Highveld Lions won the toss and elected to field.

2 March
18:00 (D/N)
Scorecard

Dolphins; 136/4 (20 overs)	v	(H) Warriors; 138/1 (17.3 overs)
Vaughn van Jaarsveld 58* (41); Andrew Birch 2/21 (3 overs)		Ashwell Prince 70* (55); Prenelan Subrayen 1/33 (4 overs)

Warriors won by 9 wickets
Buffalo Park, East London
Umpires: Ian Howell and Gerrie Pienaar
Player of the match: Ashwell Prince (batsman, Warriors), Wayne Parnell (bowler, Warriors)

- Dolphins won the toss and elected to bat.

6 March
18:00 (D/N)
Scorecard

Knights; 196/3 (20 overs)	v	(H) Titans; 188/8 (20 overs)
Loots Bosman 91 (57); David Wiese 1/20 (2 overs)		Roelof van der Merwe 66 (45); Johan van der Wath 2/13 (2 overs)

Knights won by 8 runs
SuperSport Park, Centurion
Umpires: Earl Hendrikse and Adrian Holdstock
Player of the match: Loots Bosman (batsman, Knights), Dean Elgar (bowler, Knights)

- Titans won the toss and elected to field.

6 March
18:00 (D/N)
Scorecard

Cape Cobras; 129/7 (20 overs)	v	(H) Warriors; 130/4 (19.3 overs)
Justin Ontong 41 (36); Wayne Parnell 2/19 (4 overs)		Adrian McLaren 36* (34); Azhar Mahmood 2/20 (4 overs)

Warriors won by 6 wickets
St George's Park, Port Elizabeth
Umpires: Ian Howell and Patrick Jele
Player of the match: Samit Patel (batsman, Warriors), Andrew Birch (bowler, Warriors)

- Cape Cobras won the toss and elected to bat.

8 March
18:00 (D/N)
Scorecard

(H) Cape Cobras; 117/6 (20 overs)	v	Highveld Lions; 120/5 (18.2 overs)
Dane Vilas 30 (36); Chris Morris 2/21 (4 overs)		Alviro Petersen 46 (36); Beuran Hendricks 3/17 (4 overs)

Highveld Lions won by 5 wickets
Newlands, Cape Town
Umpires: Karl Hurter and Allahudien Paleker
Player of the match: Alviro Petersen (batsman, Highveld Lions), Beuran Hendricks (bowler, Cape Cobras)

- Highveld Lions won the toss and elected to field.

8 March
18:00 (D/N)
Scorecard

(H) Dolphins; 179/2 (20 overs)	v	Knights; 165/6 (20 overs)
Cameron Delport 103* (58); Johan van der Wath 1/25 (4 overs)		Rilee Rossouw 44 (28); Yusuf Abdulla 2/17 (4 overs)

Dolphins won by 14 runs
Kingsmead, Durban
Umpires: Ian Howell and Brian Jerling
Player of the match: Cameron Delport (batsman, Dolphins), Yusuf Abdulla (bowler, Dolphins)

- Dolphins won the toss and elected to bat.

8 March
18:00 (D/N)
Scorecard

Warriors; 152/9 (20 overs)	v	(H) Titans; 140/6 (20 overs)
Christiaan Jonker 50 (33); Alfonso Thomas 3/30 (4 overs)		Scott Styris 47* (34); Wayne Parnell 4/25 (4 overs)

Warriors won by 12 runs
Willowmoore Park, Benoni
Umpires: Murray Brown and Adrian Holdstock
Player of the match: Christiaan Jonker (batsman, Warriors), Wayne Parnell (bowler, Warriors)

- Titans won the toss and elected to field.

12 March
14:30
Scorecard

(H) Knights; 143/8 (20 overs)	v	Highveld Lions; 145/6 (19.1 overs)
Rilee Rossouw 76 (47); Chris Morris 2/21 (4 overs)		Quinton de Kock 42 (33); Jandre Coetzee 2/20 (4 overs)

Highveld Lions won by 4 wickets
De Beers Diamond Oval, Kimberley
Umpires: Murray Brown and Allahudien Paleker
Player of the match: Jean Symes (batsman, Highveld Lions), Chris Morris (bowler, Highveld Lions)

- Knights won the toss and elected to bat.

12 March
18:00 (D/N)
Scorecard

Titans; 178/4 (20 overs)	v	(H) Cape Cobras; 171/4 (20 overs)
Farhaan Behardien 68 (40); Azhar Mahmood 3/34 (4 overs)		Owais Shah 61* (38); Roelof van der Merwe 2/20 (4 overs)

Titans won by 7 runs
Boland Park, Paarl
Umpires: Shaun George and Karl Hurter
Player of the match: Farhaan Behardien (batsman, Titans), Roelof van der Merwe (bowler, Titans)

- Cape Cobras won the toss and elected to field.

14 March
14:30
Scorecard

(H) Dolphins; 158/7 (20 overs)	v	Cape Cobras; 136/7 (20 overs)
Divan van Wyk 35 (26); Dane Piedt 2/16 (3 overs)		Dane Vilas 47 (40); Calvin Savage 4/33 (4 overs)

Dolphins won by 22 runs
Kingsmead, Durban
Umpires: Murray Brown and Ian Howell
Player of the match: Dane Vilas (batsman, Cape Cobras), Calvin Savage (bowler, Dolphins)

- Cape Cobras won the toss and elected to field.

14 March
14:30
Scorecard

Knights; 114/4 (20 overs)	v	(H) Warriors; 108/7 (20 overs)
Dean Elgar 61* (60); Ayabulela Gqamane 1/22 (4 overs)		Ashwell Prince 37 (47); Dean Elgar 4/23 (4 overs)

Knights won by 6 runs
St George's Park, Port Elizabeth
Umpires: Marais Erasmus and Patrick Jele

- Knights won the toss and elected to bat.

19 March
18:00 (D/N)
Scorecard

(H) Titans; 178/5 (20 overs)	v	Highveld Lions; 171/6 (20 overs)
Henry Davids 50 (27); Sohail Tanvir 2/26 (4 overs)		Quinton de Kock 73 (40); Albie Morkel 3/26 (4 overs)

Titans won by 7 runs
SuperSport Park, Centurion
Umpires: Adrian Holdstock and Brian Jerling
Player of the match: Quinton de Kock (batsman, Highveld Lions), Albie Morkel (bowler, Titans)

- Highveld Lions won the toss and elected to field.

22 March
18:00 (D/N)
Scorecard

Cape Cobras; 140/7 (20 overs)	v	(H) Knights; 143/3 (19.4 overs)
Justin Ontong 51* (39); Shadley van Schalkwyk 2/23 (4 overs)		Dean Elgar 56* (50); Vernon Philander 2/17 (4 overs)

Knights won by 7 wickets
Chevrolet Park, Bloemfontein
Umpires: Gerrie Pienaar and Dennis Smith
Player of the match: Dean Elgar (batsman, Knights), Vernon Philander (bowler, Cape Cobras)

- Knights won the toss and elected to field.

22 March
18:00 (D/N)
Scorecard

Dolphins; 143/5 (20 overs)	v	(H) Titans; 145/6 (18.5 overs)
Cody Chetty 44 (28); Roelof van der Merwe 2/21 (3 overs)		Farhaan Behardien 34* (25); Keshav Maharaj 2/13 (4 overs)

Titans won by 4 wickets
SuperSport Park, Centurion
Umpires: Karl Hurter and Brad White
Player of the match: David Wiese (batsman, Titans), Keshav Maharaj (bowler, Dolphins)

- Dolphins won the toss and elected to bat.

22 March
18:00 (D/N)
Scorecard

(H) Warriors; 142/7 (20 overs)	v	Highveld Lions; 138/6 (20 overs)
Christiaan Jonker 42 (38); Sohail Tanvir 2/22 (4 overs)		Neil McKenzie 55* (41); Rusty Theron 3/25 (4 overs)

Warriors won by 4 runs
Buffalo Park, East London
Umpires: Murray Brown and Earl Hendrikse
Player of the match: Neil McKenzie (batsman, Highveld Lions), Rusty Theron (bowler, Warriors)

- Warriors won the toss and elected to bat.

26 March
18:00 (D/N)
Scorecard

(H) Dolphins	v	Warriors

Match abandoned without a ball bowled
Kingsmead, Durban
Umpires: Murray Brown and Marais Erasmus

26 March
18:00 (D/N)
Scorecard

(H) Knights; 132/7 (20 overs)	v	Titans; 133/2 (19.2 overs)
Obus Pienaar 31 (16); Morné Morkel 4/19 (4 overs)		Scott Styris 57* (43); Nicky Boje 1/15 (4 overs)

Titans won by 8 wickets
Chevrolet Park, Bloemfontein
Umpires: Johan Cloete and Adrian Holdstock
Player of the match: Scott Styris (batsman, Titans), Morné Morkel (bowler, Titans)

- Titans won the toss and elected to field.

28 March
18:00 (D/N)
Scorecard

(H) Cape Cobras; 128/5 (19 overs)	v	Warriors; 130/2 (12.3 overs)
Owais Shah 33* (29); Rusty Theron 2/35 (4 overs)		Christiaan Jonker 64* (39); Johann Louw 1/8 (2 overs)

Warriors won by 8 wickets
Newlands, Cape Town
Umpires: Earl Hendrikse and Adrian Holdstock
Player of the match: Christiaan Jonker (batsman, Warriors), Wayne Parnell (bowler, Warriors)

- Warriors won the toss and elected to field.
- Rain reduced the match to 19 overs per side.

28 March
18:00 (D/N)
Scorecard

(H) Highveld Lions; 195/4 (20 overs)	v	Dolphins; 141/9 (20 overs)
Quinton de Kock 97 (61); Kyle Abbott 2/19 (4 overs)		Daryn Smit 41 (25); Hardus Viljoen 2/22 (4 overs)

Highveld Lions won by 54 runs
New Wanderers Stadium, Johannesburg
Umpires: Johan Cloete and Ian Howell
Player of the match: Quinton de Kock (batsman, Highveld Lions), Hardus Viljoen (bowler, Highveld Lions)

- Dolphins won the toss and elected to field.

=== Knockout stage ===
Semi-final

3 April
18:00 (D/N)
Scorecard

(H) Warriors; 127/9 (20 overs)	v	Titans; 130/6 (19.5 overs)
Davy Jacobs 51 (43); Alfonso Thomas 5/24 (4 overs)		Farhaan Behardien 41* (26); Lundi Mbane 2/9 (2 overs)

Titans won by 4 wickets
Buffalo Park, East London
Umpires: Shaun George and Adrian Holdstock
Player of the match: Farhaan Behardien (batsman, Titans), Alfonso Thomas (bowler, Titans)

- Titans won the toss and elected to field.

Final

7 April
14:30
Scorecard

(H) Highveld Lions; 155/5 (20 overs)	v	Titans; 125 (18.1 overs)
Quinton de Kock 44 (31); Henry Davids 1/12 (2 overs)		Herschelle Gibbs 22 (22); Chris Morris 2/18 (3.1 overs)

Highveld Lions won by 30 runs
New Wanderers Stadium, Johannesburg
Umpires: Shaun George and Adrian Holdstock
Player of the match: Quinton de Kock (batsman, Highveld Lions), Aaron Phangiso (bowler, Highveld Lions)

- Highveld Lions won the toss and elected to bat.
