= 2010 Standard Bank Pro20 =

- Administrator: Cricket South Africa
- Cricket format: Twenty20
- Tournament format(s): Round-robin and knockout
- Host: South Africa
- Champions: Warriors (1st title)
- Participants: 6
- Matches: 22
- Most runs: Colin Ingram (283) (Warriors)
- Most wickets: Robert Frylinck (14) (Lions)

The 2010 Standard Bank Pro20 season was the seventh season of the Standard Bank Pro20 Series, established by the Cricket South Africa in 2010, and seventh season of the CSA T20 Challenge overall. The series was played between 3 February and 12 March 2010. The tournament was won by the Warriors, who defeated the Highveld Lions in the final.

== Venues ==
Stadium	City	Capacity	Home team
Sahara Park Newlands	Cape Town	25,000	Cape Cobras
Boland Park	Paarl	10,000	Cape Cobras
Sahara Park Kingsmead	Durban	25,000	Dolphins
Pietermaritzburg Oval	Pietermaritzburg	12,000	Dolphins
OUTsurance Oval	Bloemfontein	20,000	Diamond Eagles
De Beers Diamond Oval	Kimberley	11,000	Diamond Eagles
Liberty Life Wanderers Stadium	Johannesburg	34,000	Highveld Lions
Senwes Park	Potchefstroom	9,000	Highveld Lions
Willowmoore Park	Benoni	20,000	Titans
Supersport Park	Centurion	20,000	Titans
DSL St George's	Port Elizabeth	19,000	Warriors
Buffalo Park	East London	15,000	Warriors

== Rules and regulations ==
Points were awarded as follows:

Point system
Result	Points
Win, with bonus point	6 points
Win, without bonus point	5 points
Tie	3 points
No result	2 points
Loss, but not conceding bonus point	1 point
Loss, conceding bonus point	0 points

- The team that achieves a run rate of 1.25 times that of the opposition shall be rewarded one bonus point.
- A team's run rate will be calculated by reference to the runs scored in an innings divided by the number of overs faced.

== Teams and standings ==
Pos	Team	Pld	W	L	T	NR	BP	Ded	Pts	NRR
1	Warriors (C)	5	4	1	0	0	0	0	16	−0.077
2	Titans	5	3	1	0	1	1	0	15	1.117
3	Highveld Lions (R)	5	3	2	0	0	0	1	11	−0.179
4	Cape Cobras	5	2	3	0	0	1	0	9	0.152
5	Diamond Eagles	5	2	3	0	0	0	0	8	−0.059
6	Dolphins	5	0	4	0	1	0	1	1	−0.740

(C) = Eventual Champion; (R) = Runner-up.
Note: The winner and runner-up qualified for the 2010 Champions League Twenty20.

== Results ==
=== Group stage ===
	Cape Cobras	Diamond Eagles	Dolphins	Highveld Lions	Titans	Warriors
Cape Cobras		Diamond Eagles; 8 wickets	Cape Cobras; 14 runs	Cape Cobras; 42 runs		
Diamond Eagles				Lions; 2 runs	Titans; 9 wickets	
Dolphins		Diamond Eagles; 13 runs			Abandoned; No result	Warriors; 23 runs
Highveld Lions			Lions; 6 wickets			Warriors; 5 wickets
Titans	Titans; 17 runs (D/L)			Lions; 4 wickets		Titans; 55 runs
Warriors	Warriors; 19 runs	Warriors; 3 runs				

Note: Click on the results to see match summary.

Home team won	Visitor team won	Match abandoned

=== Knockout stage ===
Semi-finals
1	Warriors	2
4	Cape Cobras	0
2	Titans	0
3	Highveld Lions	2

Final
1	Warriors	186/2 (20 overs)
3	Highveld Lions	104 (17.5 overs)

== Fixtures ==
All times shown are in South African Standard Time (UTC+02).

=== Group stage ===
3 February
18:00 D/N
Scorecard

Dolphins; 86/3 (13.3 overs)	v	Titans
David Miller 30* (21); Albie Morkel 1/12 (2.3 overs)

No result
Sahara Park Kingsmead, Durban
Umpires: Marais Erasmus and Brian Jerling

- The Dolphins won the toss and elected to bat.
- Rain first reduced the first innings to 14 overs before the match was abandoned.

5 February
18:00 D/N
Scorecard

Cape Cobras; 179 (20 overs)	v	Highveld Lions; 137 (19 overs)
Herschelle Gibbs 53 (32); Robert Frylinck 4/31 (4 overs)		Vaughn van Jaarsveld 39 (22); Charl Langeveldt 3/18 (4 overs)

Cape Cobras won by 42 runs
Sahara Park Newlands, Cape Town
Umpires: Murray Brown and Marais Erasmus

- The Lions won the toss and elected to field.

5 February
18:00 D/N
Scorecard

Warriors; 149/7 (20 overs)	v	Diamond Eagles; 146/6 (20 overs)
Colin Ingram 61 (49); Dillon du Preez 2/22 (4 overs)		Ryan Bailey 73* (47); Juan Theron 2/24 (4 overs)

Warriors won by 3 runs
Buffalo Park, East London
Umpires: Zed Ndamane and Dennis Smith

- The Warriors won the toss and elected to bat.

7 February
14:30
Scorecard

Warriors; 162/5 (20 overs)	v	Dolphins; 139/8 (20 overs)
Arno Jacobs 54 (51); Andrew Hall 2/38 (4 overs)		Imraan Khan 45 (31); Juan Theron 2/20 (4 overs)

Warriors won by 23 runs
Sahara Park Kingsmead, Durban
Umpires: Earl Hendrikse and Ian Howell

- The Warriors won the toss and elected to bat.

7 February
14:30
Scorecard

Titans; 136/1 (12 overs)	v	Cape Cobras; 122/6 (12 overs)
Gulam Bodi 88* (44); Robin Peterson 1/26 (26 overs)		Herschelle Gibbs 48 (28); Albie Morkel 2/22 (2 overs)

Titans won by 17 runs (D/L)
Supersport Park, Centurion
Umpires: Brian Jerling and Brad White

- The Cape Cobras won the toss and elected to field.
- Lightning reduced the match to 12 overs per side. The Cape Cobras were set a target of 140 runs.

10 February
18:00 D/N
Scorecard

Diamond Eagles; 152/9 (20 overs)	v	Dolphins; 139 (19.5 overs)
Morne van Wyk 62 (43); Johann Louw 3/27 (4 overs)		Ahmed Amla 43 (35); Dillon du Preez 3/24 (4 overs)

Diamond Eagles won by 13 runs
Sahara Park Kingsmead, Durban
Umpires: Zed Ndamane and Gerrie Pienaar

- The Eagles won the toss and elected to bat.

10 February
18:00 D/N
Scorecard

Titans; 145/5 (20 overs)	v	Highveld Lions; 149/6 (18.4 overs)
Jacques Rudolph 58 (50); Ethan O'Reilly 3/27 (4 overs)		Dane Vilas 53 (37); Ethy Mbhalati 4/20 (4 overs)

Lions won by 4 wickets
Supersport Park, Centurion
Umpires: Murray Brown and Karl Hurter

- The Titans won the toss and elected to bat.

12 February
18:00 D/N
Scorecard

Highveld Lions; 155/9 (20 overs)	v	Warriors; 156/5 (19.5 overs)
Vaughn van Jaarsveld 72 (51); Lyall Meyer 2/23 (4 overs)		Colin Ingram 82 (52); Robert Frylinck 2/24 (4 overs)

Warriors won by 5 wickets
Liberty Life Wanderers Stadium, Johannesburg
Umpires: Johanes Cloete and Adrian Holdstock

- The Warriors won the toss and elected to field.

13 February
18:00 D/N
Scorecard

Cape Cobras; 116/7 (20 overs)	v	Dolphins; 102 (20 overs)
Justin Kemp 59 (43); Kyle Nipper 2/10 (3 overs)		David Miller 26 (26); Vernon Philander 5/17 (4 overs)

Cape Cobras won by 14 runs
Sahara Park Newlands, Cape Town
Umpires: Earl Hendrikse and Brad White

- The Cape Cobras won the toss and elected to bat.

14 February
14:30
Scorecard

Diamond Eagles; 125/5 (20 overs)	v	Titans; 126/1 (17.3 overs)
Boeta Dippenaar 36* (29); Faf du Plessis 1/20 (4 overs)		Blake Snijman 89* (64); Dillon du Preez 1/24 (4 overs)

Titans won by 9 wickets
De Beers Diamond Oval, Kimberley
Umpires: Gerrie Pienaar and Dennis Smith

- The Titans won the toss and elected to field.

17 February
18:00 D/N
Scorecard

Cape Cobras; 137/5 (20 overs)	v	Diamond Eagles; 138/2 (19.2 overs)
Justin Ontong 37* (29); Dillon du Preez 3/17 (4 overs)		Morne van Wyk 85* (58); Justin Ontong 1/19

Diamond Eagles won by 8 wickets
Boland Park, Paarl
Umpires: Johanes Cloete and Shaun George

- The Cape Cobras won the toss and elected to bat.

19 February
18:00 D/N
Scorecard

Dolphins; 159/5 (20 overs)	v	Highveld Lions; 162/4 (19.1 overs)
David Miller 90* (52); Ethan O'Reilly 2/20 (3 overs)		Neil McKenzie 46 (42); Dale Benkenstein 1/24 (4 overs)

Lions won by 6 wickets
Senwes Park, Potchefstroom
Umpires: Murray Brown and Adrian Holdstock

- The Lions won the toss and elected to field.

19 February
18:00 D/N
Scorecard

Warriors; 172/5 (20 overs)	v	Cape Cobras; 153/8 (20 overs)
Justin Kreusch 61 (45); Monde Zondeki 2/21 (4 overs)		Vernon Philander 37* (18); Nicky Boje 3/10 (4 overs)

Warriors won by 19 runs
axxess DSL St George's, Port Elizabeth
Umpires: Johanes Cloete and Ian Howell

- The Cape Cobras won the toss and elected to field.

21 February
14:30
Scorecard

Highveld Lions; 184/6 (20 overs)	v	Diamond Eagles; 182/7 (20 overs)
Jonathan Vandiar 56 (40); Johan van der Wath 2/22 (4 overs)		Morne van Wyk 74 (51); Robert Frylinck 2/35 (4 overs)

Lions won by 2 runs
OUTsurance Oval, Bloemfontein
Umpires: Johanes Cloete and Karl Hurter

- The Eagles won the toss and elected to field.

21 February
14:30
Scorecard

Titans; 182/4 (20 overs)	v	Warriors; 127 (18.4 overs)
Jacques Rudolph 69 (37); Garnett Kruger 3/26 (4 overs)		JJ Smuts 34 (29); David Wiese 5/19 (4 overs)

Titans won by 55 runs
Supersport Park, Centurion
Umpires: Shaun George and Brian Jerling

- The Warriors won the toss and elected to field.

=== Knockout stage ===
At the end of the group stage, the top four teams qualify for the semi-finals. The semi-finals are best-of-three playoffs, with the top seed facing the fourth seed and the second seed facing the third seed. If a match in the knockout stage ends with a tie, a Super Over will determine the winner.

==== Semi-finals ====
24 February
18:00 D/N
Scorecard

Titans; 143/5 (20 overs)	v	Highveld Lions; 146/6 (20 overs)
Heino Kuhn 35* (27); Ethan O'Reilly 2/18 (4 overs)		Neil McKenzie 35 (34); Faf du Plessis 3/18 (4 overs)

Lions won by 4 wickets
Liberty Life Wanderers Stadium, Johannesburg
Umpires: Shaun George and Brian Jerling

- The Lions won the toss and elected to field.

26 February
18:00 D/N
Scorecard

Warriors; 149/3 (20 overs)	v	Cape Cobras; 146/8 (20 overs)
Colin Ingram 60* (41); Vernon Philander 1/24 (4 overs)		Robin Peterson 50* (46); Juan Theron 2/23 (4 overs)

Warriors won by 3 runs
axxess DSL St George's, Port Elizabeth
Umpires: Johanes Cloete and Dennis Smith

- The Warriors won the toss and elected to bat.

3 March
18:00 D/N
Scorecard

Warriors; 121/6 (20 overs)	v	Cape Cobras; 111/6 (20 overs)
Johan Botha 29* (27); Justin Kemp 2/8 (2 overs)		Justin Kemp 29 (25); Makhaya Ntini 2/12 (4 overs)

Warriors won by 10 runs
Sahara Park Newlands, Cape Town
Umpires: Marais Erasmus and Karl Hurter

- The Warriors won the toss and elected to bat.

5 March
18:00 D/N
Scorecard

Highveld Lions; 186/5 (20 overs)	v	Titans; 176/7 (20 overs)
Jonathan Vandiar 68 (43); Paul Harris 3/32 (4 overs)		Blake Snijman 54 (30); Richard Cameron 4/23 (4 overs)

Lions won by 10 runs
Supersport Park, Centurion
Umpires: Murray Brown and Ian Howell

- The Titans won the toss and elected to field.

==== Final ====
12 March
18:00 D/N
Scorecard

Warriors; 186/2 (20 overs)	v	Highveld Lions; 104 (17.5 overs)
Ashwell Prince 69 (52); Robert Frylinck 1/14 (4 overs)		Robert Frylinck 15 (7); Nicky Boje 2/15 (4 overs)

Warriors won by 82 runs
axxess DSL St George's, Port Elizabeth
Umpires: Johanes Cloete and Shaun George

- The Warriors won the toss and elected to bat.
