= 2012 Champions League Twenty20 =

International cricket tournament

- Administrators: BCCI; Cricket Australia; Cricket South Africa
- Cricket format: Twenty20
- Tournament format(s): Round-robin and knockout
- Host: South Africa
- Champions: Sydney Sixers (1st title)
- Runners-up: Highveld Lions
- Participants: 10
- Matches: 23
- Player of the series: Mitchell Starc
- Most runs: Michael Lumb (226 runs)
- Most wickets: Mitchell Starc (14 wickets)
- Official website: www.clt20.com

The 2012 Champions League Twenty20 was the fourth edition of the Champions League Twenty20, an international Twenty20 cricket tournament. It was held in South Africa from 9 to 28 October 2012.

Sydney Sixers won the tournament, defeating Highveld Lions in the final.

== Background ==
Since the previous edition, three Test-playing nations had introduced new Twenty20 tournaments. Australia established the city-based Big Bash League, replacing the established state structured KFC Twenty20 Big Bash, the Sri Lanka Premier League also featured city-based franchise teams, and the Bangladesh Premier League was established in February 2012, although teams from the league did not feature in the Champions League in 2012.

== Qualification ==
As in the previous season, the tournament featured a qualifying stage, although with only two of the six teams competing in it qualified for the final stages, compared with three during 2011.

This qualifying stages included a team from Pakistan for the first time, with teams previously excluded due to friction between India and Pakistan following the 2008 Mumbai attacks. Whilst in 2011 the fourth-ranked Indian Premier League team had played in the qualifying stage, this year's team, Mumbai Indians, qualified for the final stages as the defending champions.

== Teams ==
Qualified teams
Cricket Board	Team	How qualified
Australia	Perth Scorchers	Runners-up, 2011–12 Big Bash League
Australia	Sydney Sixers	Winners, 2011–12 Big Bash League
England and Wales	Yorkshire Carnegie	Qualifying stage
India	Chennai Super Kings	Runners-up, 2012 Indian Premier League
India	Delhi Daredevils	Third ranked team, 2012 Indian Premier League
India	Kolkata Knight Riders	Winners, 2012 Indian Premier League
India	Mumbai Indians	Fourth ranked team, 2012 Indian Premier League
New Zealand	Auckland Aces	Qualifying stage
South Africa	Highveld Lions	Runners-up, 2011–12 MiWay T20 Challenge
South Africa	Titans	Winners, 2011–12 MiWay T20 Challenge

== Squads ==
As with previous editions, several players had the opportunity to play for more than one team. These players were allowed to play for the teams of their choice, although if they did not choose to play for their "home" team, a compensation fee of $150,000 was payable. Nine players were names in the preliminary squad of more than one team, all of whom chose to play for their Indian Premier League team.

== Venues ==

The organisers originally considered hosting the tournament at five venues across India, but this was changed due to the possibility of monsoons and Durga Puja celebrations, with South Africa chosen to host matches. Four venues were chosen, SuperSport Park at Centurion, Kingsmead at Durban, New Wanderers Stadium at Johannesburg and Newlands at Cape Town.

== Qualifying stage fixtures ==
All times shown are in South African Standard Time (UTC+02).

=== Pool 1 ===
Pos	Team	Pld	W	L	NR	Pts	NRR
1	Auckland Aces	2	2	0	0	8	1.904
2	Sialkot Stallions	2	1	1	0	4	−0.511
3	Hampshire Royals	2	0	2	0	0	−1.331

9 October	Sialkot Stallions; 130/9 (20 overs)	v	Auckland Aces; 136/4 (17.1 overs)	Auckland Aces won by 6 wickets
17:30 (D/N); Scorecard	Sialkot Stallions; 130/9 (20 overs)	v	Auckland Aces; 136/4 (17.1 overs)	New Wanderers Stadium, Johannesburg; Umpires: Kumar Dharmasena (SL) and Marais Erasmus (SA); Player of the match: Kyle Mills (Auckland Aces)
17:30 (D/N); Scorecard	Shahid Yousuf 39 (25); Kyle Mills 2/6 (4 overs)		Martin Guptill 40 (32); Sarfraz Ahmed 2/31 (4 overs)	New Wanderers Stadium, Johannesburg; Umpires: Kumar Dharmasena (SL) and Marais Erasmus (SA); Player of the match: Kyle Mills (Auckland Aces)
Sialkot Stallions won the toss and elected to bat				New Wanderers Stadium, Johannesburg; Umpires: Kumar Dharmasena (SL) and Marais Erasmus (SA); Player of the match: Kyle Mills (Auckland Aces)

10 October	Hampshire Royals; 121/8 (20 overs)	v	Auckland Aces; 123/2 (14.3 overs)	Auckland Aces won by 8 wickets
13:30; Scorecard	Hampshire Royals; 121/8 (20 overs)	v	Auckland Aces; 123/2 (14.3 overs)	SuperSport Park, Centurion; Umpires: Asad Rauf (Pak) and Kumar Dharmasena (SL); Player of the match: Azhar Mahmood (Auckland Aces)
13:30; Scorecard	Michael Carberry 65 (65); Azhar Mahmood 5/24 (4 overs)		Azhar Mahmood 55* (30); Chris Wood 1/21 (2 overs)	SuperSport Park, Centurion; Umpires: Asad Rauf (Pak) and Kumar Dharmasena (SL); Player of the match: Azhar Mahmood (Auckland Aces)
Auckland Aces won the toss and elected to field; Auckland Aces qualify for the Group Stage, Hampshire Royals and Sialkot Stallions are eliminated as a result of this match				SuperSport Park, Centurion; Umpires: Asad Rauf (Pak) and Kumar Dharmasena (SL); Player of the match: Azhar Mahmood (Auckland Aces)

11 October	Hampshire Royals; 143/8 (20 overs)	v	Sialkot Stallions; 144/4 (19.1 overs)	Sialkot Stallions won by 6 wickets
17:30 (D/N); Scorecard	Hampshire Royals; 143/8 (20 overs)	v	Sialkot Stallions; 144/4 (19.1 overs)	New Wanderers Stadium, Johannesburg; Umpires: Asad Rauf (Pak) and Kumar Dharmasena (SL); Player of the match: Haris Sohail (Sialkot Stallions)
17:30 (D/N); Scorecard	Glenn Maxwell 42 (29); Umaid Asif 2/42 (4 overs)		Haris Sohail 63* (57); Liam Dawson 1/14 (2 overs)	New Wanderers Stadium, Johannesburg; Umpires: Asad Rauf (Pak) and Kumar Dharmasena (SL); Player of the match: Haris Sohail (Sialkot Stallions)
Sialkot Stallions won the toss and elected to field				New Wanderers Stadium, Johannesburg; Umpires: Asad Rauf (Pak) and Kumar Dharmasena (SL); Player of the match: Haris Sohail (Sialkot Stallions)

=== Pool 2 ===
Pos	Team	Pld	W	L	NR	Pts	NRR
1	Yorkshire Carnegie	2	2	0	0	8	0.507
2	Uva Next	2	0	1	1	2	−0.244
3	Trinidad and Tobago	2	0	1	1	2	−0.777

9 October	Uva Next; 150/7 (20 overs)	v	Yorkshire Carnegie; 151/5 (19.3 overs)	Yorkshire Carnegie won by 5 wickets
13:30; Scorecard	Uva Next; 150/7 (20 overs)	v	Yorkshire Carnegie; 151/5 (19.3 overs)	New Wanderers Stadium, Johannesburg; Umpires: Asad Rauf (Pak) and Marais Erasmus (SA); Player of the match: Adil Rashid (Yorkshire Carnegie)
13:30; Scorecard	Thilina Kandamby 29* (22); Moin Ashraf 2/29 (4 overs)		David Miller 39* (29); Dilshan Munaweera 3/32 (4 overs)	New Wanderers Stadium, Johannesburg; Umpires: Asad Rauf (Pak) and Marais Erasmus (SA); Player of the match: Adil Rashid (Yorkshire Carnegie)
Yorkshire Carnegie won the toss and elected to field; T20 debut : Dan Hodgson (Yorkshire Carnegie)				New Wanderers Stadium, Johannesburg; Umpires: Asad Rauf (Pak) and Marais Erasmus (SA); Player of the match: Adil Rashid (Yorkshire Carnegie)

10 October	Trinidad and Tobago; 148/9 (20 overs)	v	Yorkshire Carnegie; 154/4 (18.5 overs)	Yorkshire Carnegie won by 6 wickets
17:30 (D/N); Scorecard	Trinidad and Tobago; 148/9 (20 overs)	v	Yorkshire Carnegie; 154/4 (18.5 overs)	SuperSport Park, Centurion; Umpires: Asad Rauf (Pak) and Marais Erasmus (SA); Player of the match: Gary Ballance (Yorkshire Carnegie)
17:30 (D/N); Scorecard	Dinesh Ramdin 59 (40); Ryan Sidebottom 3/13 (4 overs)		Gary Ballance 64* (37); Yannick Ottley 1/16 (2 overs)	SuperSport Park, Centurion; Umpires: Asad Rauf (Pak) and Marais Erasmus (SA); Player of the match: Gary Ballance (Yorkshire Carnegie)
Trinidad and Tobago won the toss and elected to bat; Yorkshire Carnegie qualify for the Group Stage, Trinidad and Tobago and Uva Next are eliminated as a result of this match				SuperSport Park, Centurion; Umpires: Asad Rauf (Pak) and Marais Erasmus (SA); Player of the match: Gary Ballance (Yorkshire Carnegie)

11 October	Trinidad and Tobago; 181/3 (20 overs)	v	Uva Next; 0/1 (0.1 overs)	No result
13:30; Scorecard	Trinidad and Tobago; 181/3 (20 overs)	v	Uva Next; 0/1 (0.1 overs)	New Wanderers Stadium, Johannesburg; Umpires: Kumar Dharmasena (SL) and Marais Erasmus (SA)
13:30; Scorecard	Darren Bravo 54* (42); Andrew McDonald 1/28 (4 overs)		Shannon Gabriel 1/0 (0.1 overs)	New Wanderers Stadium, Johannesburg; Umpires: Kumar Dharmasena (SL) and Marais Erasmus (SA)
Uva Next won the toss and elected to field; Match abandoned after first ball of second innings due to rain				New Wanderers Stadium, Johannesburg; Umpires: Kumar Dharmasena (SL) and Marais Erasmus (SA)

== Final stage fixtures ==
=== Group A ===
Pos	Team	Pld	W	L	NR	Pts	NRR
1	Delhi Daredevils	4	2	0	2	12	1.440
2	Titans	4	2	1	1	10	−0.017
3	Kolkata Knight Riders	4	1	2	1	6	0.488
4	Perth Scorchers	4	1	2	1	6	−0.474
5	Auckland Aces	4	1	2	1	6	−0.963

13 October	Titans; 163/4 (20 overs)	v	Perth Scorchers; 124/7 (20 overs)	Titans won by 39 runs
13:30; Scorecard	Titans; 163/4 (20 overs)	v	Perth Scorchers; 124/7 (20 overs)	SuperSport Park, Centurion; Umpires: Aleem Dar (Pak) and Marais Erasmus (SA); Player of the match: Cornelius de Villiers (Titans)
13:30; Scorecard	Jacques Rudolph 83* (59); Nathan Rimmington 2/20 (4 overs)		Mitchell Marsh 52* (41); Cornelius de Villiers 3/16 (4 overs)	SuperSport Park, Centurion; Umpires: Aleem Dar (Pak) and Marais Erasmus (SA); Player of the match: Cornelius de Villiers (Titans)
Perth Scorchers won the toss and elected to field				SuperSport Park, Centurion; Umpires: Aleem Dar (Pak) and Marais Erasmus (SA); Player of the match: Cornelius de Villiers (Titans)

13 October	Delhi Daredevils; 160/8 (20 overs)	v	Kolkata Knight Riders; 108/7 (20 overs)	Delhi Daredevils won by 52 runs
17:30 (D/N); Scorecard	Delhi Daredevils; 160/8 (20 overs)	v	Kolkata Knight Riders; 108/7 (20 overs)	SuperSport Park, Centurion; Umpires: Aleem Dar (Pak) and Rod Tucker (Aus); Player of the match: Irfan Pathan (Delhi Daredevils)
17:30 (D/N); Scorecard	Unmukt Chand 40 (27); Sunil Narine 3/21 (4 overs)		Manoj Tiwary 33 (38); Umesh Yadav 2/13 (4 overs)	SuperSport Park, Centurion; Umpires: Aleem Dar (Pak) and Rod Tucker (Aus); Player of the match: Irfan Pathan (Delhi Daredevils)
Kolkata Knight Riders won the toss and elected to field				SuperSport Park, Centurion; Umpires: Aleem Dar (Pak) and Rod Tucker (Aus); Player of the match: Irfan Pathan (Delhi Daredevils)

15 October	Kolkata Knight Riders; 137/6 (20 overs)	v	Auckland Aces; 139/3 (17.4 overs)	Auckland Aces won by 7 wickets
17:30 (D/N); Scorecard	Kolkata Knight Riders; 137/6 (20 overs)	v	Auckland Aces; 139/3 (17.4 overs)	Newlands, Cape Town; Umpires: Kumar Dharmasena (SL) and Rod Tucker (Aus); Player of the match: Azhar Mahmood (Auckland Aces)
17:30 (D/N); Scorecard	Brendon McCullum 40 (35); Azhar Mahmood 3/16 (4 overs)		Azhar Mahmood 51* (42); Sunil Narine 2/24 (4 overs)	Newlands, Cape Town; Umpires: Kumar Dharmasena (SL) and Rod Tucker (Aus); Player of the match: Azhar Mahmood (Auckland Aces)
Kolkata Knight Riders won the toss and elected to bat				Newlands, Cape Town; Umpires: Kumar Dharmasena (SL) and Rod Tucker (Aus); Player of the match: Azhar Mahmood (Auckland Aces)

17 October	Titans; 172/4 (20 overs)	v	Auckland Aces; 113 (18.1 overs)	Titans won by 59 runs
13:30; Scorecard	Titans; 172/4 (20 overs)	v	Auckland Aces; 113 (18.1 overs)	Kingsmead, Durban; Umpires: Simon Taufel (Aus) and S. Ravi (Ind); Player of the match: Farhaan Behardien (Titans)
13:30; Scorecard	Jacques Rudolph 63 (56); Michael Bates 1/21 (3 overs)		Andre Adams 30 (17); Alfonso Thomas 3/18 (3.1 overs)	Kingsmead, Durban; Umpires: Simon Taufel (Aus) and S. Ravi (Ind); Player of the match: Farhaan Behardien (Titans)
Auckland Aces won the toss and elected to field				Kingsmead, Durban; Umpires: Simon Taufel (Aus) and S. Ravi (Ind); Player of the match: Farhaan Behardien (Titans)

17 October	Perth Scorchers; 91/2 (14 overs)	v	Kolkata Knight Riders	No result
17:30 (D/N); Scorecard	Perth Scorchers; 91/2 (14 overs)	v	Kolkata Knight Riders	Kingsmead, Durban; Umpires: Asad Rauf (Pak) and Simon Taufel (Aus)
17:30 (D/N); Scorecard	Simon Katich 43* (32); Brett Lee 1/11 (2 overs)			Kingsmead, Durban; Umpires: Asad Rauf (Pak) and Simon Taufel (Aus)
Kolkata Knight Riders won the toss and elected to field; Kolkata Knight Riders are eliminated as a result of this match				Kingsmead, Durban; Umpires: Asad Rauf (Pak) and Simon Taufel (Aus)

19 October	Delhi Daredevils	v	Auckland Aces	No result
17:30 (D/N); Scorecard	Delhi Daredevils	v	Auckland Aces	Kingsmead, Durban; Umpires: Marais Erasmus (SA) and Simon Taufel (Aus)
Auckland Aces won the toss and elected to field; Match abandoned without a toss due to rain				Kingsmead, Durban; Umpires: Marais Erasmus (SA) and Simon Taufel (Aus)

21 October	Perth Scorchers; 121/5 (20 overs)	v	Delhi Daredevils; 123/7 (19.3 overs)	Delhi Daredevils won by 3 wickets
13:30; Scorecard	Perth Scorchers; 121/5 (20 overs)	v	Delhi Daredevils; 123/7 (19.3 overs)	Newlands, Cape Town; Umpires: Asad Rauf (Pak) and Simon Taufel (Aus); Player of the match: Ajit Agarkar (Delhi Daredevils)
13:30; Scorecard	Shaun Marsh 39 (41); Morne Morkel 3/19 (4 overs)		Virender Sehwag 52 (44); Michael Beer 2/18 (4 overs)	Newlands, Cape Town; Umpires: Asad Rauf (Pak) and Simon Taufel (Aus); Player of the match: Ajit Agarkar (Delhi Daredevils)
Delhi Daredevils won the toss and elected to field; Perth Scorchers are eliminated as a result of this match				Newlands, Cape Town; Umpires: Asad Rauf (Pak) and Simon Taufel (Aus); Player of the match: Ajit Agarkar (Delhi Daredevils)

21 October	Kolkata Knight Riders; 188/5 (20 overs)	v	Titans; 89 (16.4 overs)	Kolkata Knight Riders won by 99 runs
17:30 (D/N); Scorecard	Kolkata Knight Riders; 188/5 (20 overs)	v	Titans; 89 (16.4 overs)	Newlands, Cape Town; Umpires: Asad Rauf (Pak) and Marais Erasmus (SA); Player of the match: Debabrata Das (Kolkata Knight Riders)
17:30 (D/N); Scorecard	Gautam Gambhir 44 (36); Roelof van der Merwe 2/18 (4 overs)		Jacques Rudolph 25 (24); Lakshmipathy Balaji 4/19 (4 overs)	Newlands, Cape Town; Umpires: Asad Rauf (Pak) and Marais Erasmus (SA); Player of the match: Debabrata Das (Kolkata Knight Riders)
Titans won the toss and elected to field				Newlands, Cape Town; Umpires: Asad Rauf (Pak) and Marais Erasmus (SA); Player of the match: Debabrata Das (Kolkata Knight Riders)

23 October	Perth Scorchers; 140/7 (20 overs)	v	Auckland Aces; 124/8 (20 overs)	Perth Scorchers won by 16 runs
13:30; Scorecard	Perth Scorchers; 140/7 (20 overs)	v	Auckland Aces; 124/8 (20 overs)	SuperSport Park, Centurion; Umpires: Marais Erasmus (SA) and Simon Taufel (Aus); Player of the match: Michael Beer (Perth Scorchers)
13:30; Scorecard	Paul Collingwood 38 (27); Michael Bates 4/34 (4 overs)		Martin Guptill 36 (32); Michael Beer 3/13 (4 overs)	SuperSport Park, Centurion; Umpires: Marais Erasmus (SA) and Simon Taufel (Aus); Player of the match: Michael Beer (Perth Scorchers)
Perth Scorchers won the toss and elected to bat; Auckland Aces are eliminated and Dehli Daredevils and Titans qualify for the Semi-finals as a result of this match				SuperSport Park, Centurion; Umpires: Marais Erasmus (SA) and Simon Taufel (Aus); Player of the match: Michael Beer (Perth Scorchers)

23 October	Delhi Daredevils	v	Titans	No result
17:30 (D/N); Scorecard	Delhi Daredevils	v	Titans	SuperSport Park, Centurion; Umpires: Asad Rauf (Pak) and Simon Taufel (Aus)
Titans cricket team; Match abandoned without a ball bowled due to rain				SuperSport Park, Centurion; Umpires: Asad Rauf (Pak) and Simon Taufel (Aus)

=== Group B ===
Pos	Team	Pld	W	L	NR	Pts	NRR
1	Sydney Sixers	4	4	0	0	16	1.656
2	Highveld Lions	4	3	1	0	12	0.140
3	Chennai Super Kings	4	2	2	0	8	−0.049
4	Mumbai Indians	4	0	3	1	2	−0.471
5	Yorkshire Carnegie	4	0	3	1	2	−1.791

14 October	Sydney Sixers; 185/5 (20 overs)	v	Chennai Super Kings; 171/9 (20 overs)	Sydney Sixers won by 14 runs
13:30; Scorecard	Sydney Sixers; 185/5 (20 overs)	v	Chennai Super Kings; 171/9 (20 overs)	New Wanderers Stadium, Johannesburg; Umpires: Asad Rauf (Pak) and Marais Erasmus (SA); Player of the match: Moisés Henriques (Sydney Sixers)
13:30; Scorecard	Moisés Henriques 49* (23); Ravichandran Ashwin 2/32 (4 overs)		Suresh Raina 57 (33); Moisés Henriques 3/23 (3 overs)	New Wanderers Stadium, Johannesburg; Umpires: Asad Rauf (Pak) and Marais Erasmus (SA); Player of the match: Moisés Henriques (Sydney Sixers)
Chennai Super Kings won the toss and elected to field				New Wanderers Stadium, Johannesburg; Umpires: Asad Rauf (Pak) and Marais Erasmus (SA); Player of the match: Moisés Henriques (Sydney Sixers)

14 October	Mumbai Indians; 157/6 (20 overs)	v	Highveld Lions; 158/2 (18.5 overs)	Highveld Lions won by 8 wickets
17:30 (D/N); Scorecard	Mumbai Indians; 157/6 (20 overs)	v	Highveld Lions; 158/2 (18.5 overs)	New Wanderers Stadium, Johannesburg; Umpires: Marais Erasmus (SA) and Simon Taufel (Aus); Player of the match: Neil McKenzie (Highveld Lions)
17:30 (D/N); Scorecard	Mitchell Johnson 30 (29); Sohail Tanvir 2/31 (4 overs)		Neil McKenzie 68* (41); Lasith Malinga 1/18 (3.5 overs)	New Wanderers Stadium, Johannesburg; Umpires: Marais Erasmus (SA) and Simon Taufel (Aus); Player of the match: Neil McKenzie (Highveld Lions)
Highveld Lions won the toss and elected to field				New Wanderers Stadium, Johannesburg; Umpires: Marais Erasmus (SA) and Simon Taufel (Aus); Player of the match: Neil McKenzie (Highveld Lions)

16 October	Yorkshire Carnegie; 96/9 (20 overs)	v	Sydney Sixers; 98/2 (8.5 overs)	Sydney Sixers won by 8 wickets
13:30; Scorecard	Yorkshire Carnegie; 96/9 (20 overs)	v	Sydney Sixers; 98/2 (8.5 overs)	Newlands, Cape Town; Umpires: Aleem Dar (Pak) and Rod Tucker (Aus); Player of the match: Brad Haddin (Sydney Sixers)
13:30; Scorecard	Joe Root 25 (24); Mitchell Starc 3/22 (4 overs)		Michael Lumb 43* (24); Azeem Rafiq 1/21 (1.5 overs)	Newlands, Cape Town; Umpires: Aleem Dar (Pak) and Rod Tucker (Aus); Player of the match: Brad Haddin (Sydney Sixers)
Yorkshire Carnegie won the toss and elected to bat				Newlands, Cape Town; Umpires: Aleem Dar (Pak) and Rod Tucker (Aus); Player of the match: Brad Haddin (Sydney Sixers)

16 October	Chennai Super Kings; 158/6 (20 Overs)	v	Highveld Lions; 159/4 (19.3 Overs)	Highveld Lions won by 6 wickets
17:30 (D/N); Scorecard	Chennai Super Kings; 158/6 (20 Overs)	v	Highveld Lions; 159/4 (19.3 Overs)	Newlands, Cape Town; Umpires: Aleem Dar (Pak) and Kumar Dharmasena (SL); Player of the match: Aaron Phangiso (Highveld Lions)
17:30 (D/N); Scorecard	MS Dhoni 34 (26); Aaron Phangiso 2/17 (4 Overs)		Gulam Bodi 64 (46); Doug Bollinger 2/18 (4 Overs)	Newlands, Cape Town; Umpires: Aleem Dar (Pak) and Kumar Dharmasena (SL); Player of the match: Aaron Phangiso (Highveld Lions)
Highveld Lions won the toss and elected to field				Newlands, Cape Town; Umpires: Aleem Dar (Pak) and Kumar Dharmasena (SL); Player of the match: Aaron Phangiso (Highveld Lions)

18 October	Highveld Lions; 137/9 (20 overs)	v	Sydney Sixers; 141/5 (19 overs)	Sydney Sixers won by 5 wickets
13:30; Scorecard	Highveld Lions; 137/9 (20 overs)	v	Sydney Sixers; 141/5 (19 overs)	Newlands, Cape Town; Umpires: Kumar Dharmasena (SL) and Rod Tucker (Aus); Player of the match: Mitchell Starc (Sydney Sixers)
13:30; Scorecard	Gulam Bodi 61 (44); Mitchell Starc 3/19 (4 overs)		Shane Watson 47 (38); Aaron Phangiso 3/14 (4 Overs)	Newlands, Cape Town; Umpires: Kumar Dharmasena (SL) and Rod Tucker (Aus); Player of the match: Mitchell Starc (Sydney Sixers)
Sydney Sixers won the toss and elected to field				Newlands, Cape Town; Umpires: Kumar Dharmasena (SL) and Rod Tucker (Aus); Player of the match: Mitchell Starc (Sydney Sixers)

18 October	Mumbai Indians; 156/6 (17.5 overs)	v	Yorkshire Carnegie	No result
17:30 (D/N); Scorecard	Mumbai Indians; 156/6 (17.5 overs)	v	Yorkshire Carnegie	Newlands, Cape Town; Umpires: Aleem Dar (Pak) and Rod Tucker (Aus)
17:30 (D/N); Scorecard	Kieron Pollard 37* (20); Azeem Rafiq 2/36 (4 overs)			Newlands, Cape Town; Umpires: Aleem Dar (Pak) and Rod Tucker (Aus)
Yorkshire Carnegie won the toss and elected to field; Sydney Sixers qualify for the Semi-finals as a result of this match				Newlands, Cape Town; Umpires: Aleem Dar (Pak) and Rod Tucker (Aus)

20 October	Yorkshire Carnegie; 131/7 (20 overs)	v	Highveld Lions; 134/5 (19.2 overs)	Highveld Lions won by 5 wickets
13:30; Scorecard	Yorkshire Carnegie; 131/7 (20 overs)	v	Highveld Lions; 134/5 (19.2 overs)	New Wanderers Stadium, Johannesburg; Umpires: Aleem Dar (Pak) and Kumar Dharmasena (SL); Player of the match: Jean Symes (Highveld Lions)
13:30; Scorecard	Phil Jaques 31 (29); Aaron Phangiso 2/23 (4 overs)		Quinton de Kock 32 (35); Steven Patterson 2/21 (3.2 overs)	New Wanderers Stadium, Johannesburg; Umpires: Aleem Dar (Pak) and Kumar Dharmasena (SL); Player of the match: Jean Symes (Highveld Lions)
Highveld Lions won the toss and elected to field; Highveld Lions qualify for the Semi-finals and Mumbai Indians, Chennai Super Kings and Yorkshire Carnegie are eliminated as a result of this match				New Wanderers Stadium, Johannesburg; Umpires: Aleem Dar (Pak) and Kumar Dharmasena (SL); Player of the match: Jean Symes (Highveld Lions)

20 October	Chennai Super Kings; 173/8 (20 overs)	v	Mumbai Indians; 167/7 (20 overs)	Chennai Super Kings won by 6 runs
17:30 (D/N); Scorecard	Chennai Super Kings; 173/8 (20 overs)	v	Mumbai Indians; 167/7 (20 overs)	New Wanderers Stadium, Johannesburg; Umpires: Kumar Dharmasena (SL) and Rod Tucker (Aus); Player of the match: Ben Hilfenhaus (Chennai Super Kings)
17:30 (D/N); Scorecard	Faf du Plessis 52 (33); Lasith Malinga 5/32 (4 overs)		Dinesh Karthik 74 (45); Ben Hilfenhaus 2/14 (4 overs)	New Wanderers Stadium, Johannesburg; Umpires: Kumar Dharmasena (SL) and Rod Tucker (Aus); Player of the match: Ben Hilfenhaus (Chennai Super Kings)
Mumbai Indians won the toss and elected to field				New Wanderers Stadium, Johannesburg; Umpires: Kumar Dharmasena (SL) and Rod Tucker (Aus); Player of the match: Ben Hilfenhaus (Chennai Super Kings)

22 October	Yorkshire Carnegie; 140/6 (20 overs)	v	Chennai Super Kings; 141/6 (19 overs)	Chennai Super Kings won by 4 wickets
13:30; Scorecard	Yorkshire Carnegie; 140/6 (20 overs)	v	Chennai Super Kings; 141/6 (19 overs)	Kingsmead, Durban; Umpires: Aleem Dar (Pak) and Rod Tucker (Aus); Player of the match: Subramaniam Badrinath (Chennai Super Kings)
13:30; Scorecard	Gary Ballance 58 (38); Albie Morkel 2/12 (4 overs)		Subramaniam Badrinath 47 (38); Steven Patterson 2/22 (3 overs)	Kingsmead, Durban; Umpires: Aleem Dar (Pak) and Rod Tucker (Aus); Player of the match: Subramaniam Badrinath (Chennai Super Kings)
Chennai Super Kings won the toss and elected to field				Kingsmead, Durban; Umpires: Aleem Dar (Pak) and Rod Tucker (Aus); Player of the match: Subramaniam Badrinath (Chennai Super Kings)

22 October	Sydney Sixers; 136/7 (20 overs)	v	Mumbai Indians; 124/8 (20 overs)	Sydney Sixers won by 12 runs
17:30 (D/N); Scorecard	Sydney Sixers; 136/7 (20 overs)	v	Mumbai Indians; 124/8 (20 overs)	Kingsmead, Durban; Umpires: Aleem Dar (Pak) and S. Ravi (Ind); Player of the match: Steve Smith (Sydney Sixers)
17:30 (D/N); Scorecard	Steve Smith 41 (41); Munaf Patel 2/17 (4 overs)		Dwayne Smith 26 (28); Pat Cummins 2/16 (4 overs)	Kingsmead, Durban; Umpires: Aleem Dar (Pak) and S. Ravi (Ind); Player of the match: Steve Smith (Sydney Sixers)
Sydney Sixers won the toss and elected to bat				Kingsmead, Durban; Umpires: Aleem Dar (Pak) and S. Ravi (Ind); Player of the match: Steve Smith (Sydney Sixers)

=== Knockout stage ===
Semifinals
A1	Delhi Daredevils	117/9 (20 overs)
B2	Highveld Lions	139/5 (20 overs)
A2	Titans	163/5 (20 overs)
B1	Sydney Sixers	164/8 (20 overs)

Final
B2	Highveld Lions	121 (20 overs)
B1	Sydney Sixers	124/0 (12.3 overs)

25 October	Highveld Lions; 139/5 (20 overs)	v	Delhi Daredevils; 117/9 (20 overs)	Highveld Lions won by 22 runs
17:30 (D/N); Scorecard	Highveld Lions; 139/5 (20 overs)	v	Delhi Daredevils; 117/9 (20 overs)	Kingsmead, Durban; Umpires: Kumar Dharmasena (SL) and Rod Tucker (Aus); Player of the match: Neil McKenzie (Highveld Lions)
17:30 (D/N); Scorecard	Gulam Bodi 50 (49); Umesh Yadav 2/20 (4 overs)		Kevin Pietersen 50 (44); Chris Morris 2/7 (4 overs)	Kingsmead, Durban; Umpires: Kumar Dharmasena (SL) and Rod Tucker (Aus); Player of the match: Neil McKenzie (Highveld Lions)
Delhi Daredevils won the toss and elected to field; Highveld Lions qualify for the final and Delhi Daredevils are eliminated as a result of this match				Kingsmead, Durban; Umpires: Kumar Dharmasena (SL) and Rod Tucker (Aus); Player of the match: Neil McKenzie (Highveld Lions)

26 October	Titans; 163/5 (20 overs)	v	Sydney Sixers; 164/8 (20 overs)	Sydney Sixers won by 2 wickets
17:30 (D/N); Scorecard	Titans; 163/5 (20 overs)	v	Sydney Sixers; 164/8 (20 overs)	SuperSport Park, Centurion; Umpires: Asad Rauf (Pak) and Marais Erasmus (SA); Player of the match: Stephen O'Keefe (Sydney Sixers)
17:30 (D/N); Scorecard	David Wiese 61 (28); Mitchell Starc 2/33 (4 overs)		Michael Lumb 33 (20); Alfonso Thomas 2/36 (4 overs)	SuperSport Park, Centurion; Umpires: Asad Rauf (Pak) and Marais Erasmus (SA); Player of the match: Stephen O'Keefe (Sydney Sixers)
Titans won the toss and elected to bat; Sydney Sixers qualify for the final and Titans are eliminated as a result of this match				SuperSport Park, Centurion; Umpires: Asad Rauf (Pak) and Marais Erasmus (SA); Player of the match: Stephen O'Keefe (Sydney Sixers)

==== Final ====
28 October	Highveld Lions; 121 (20 overs)	v	Sydney Sixers; 124/0 (12.3 overs)	Sydney Sixers won by 10 wickets
17:30 (D/N); Scorecard	Highveld Lions; 121 (20 overs)	v	Sydney Sixers; 124/0 (12.3 overs)	New Wanderers Stadium, Johannesburg; Attendance: 28,719; Umpires: Aleem Dar (Pak) and Simon Taufel (Aus); Player of the match: Michael Lumb (Sydney Sixers)
17:30 (D/N); Scorecard	Jean Symes 51 (46); Josh Hazlewood 3/22 (4 overs)		Michael Lumb 82* (42); Sohail Tanvir 0/16 (3 overs)	New Wanderers Stadium, Johannesburg; Attendance: 28,719; Umpires: Aleem Dar (Pak) and Simon Taufel (Aus); Player of the match: Michael Lumb (Sydney Sixers)
Sydney Sixers won the toss and elected to field				New Wanderers Stadium, Johannesburg; Attendance: 28,719; Umpires: Aleem Dar (Pak) and Simon Taufel (Aus); Player of the match: Michael Lumb (Sydney Sixers)

== Statistics ==
=== Most runs ===
Player	Team	Runs
Michael Lumb	Sydney Sixers	226
Gulam Bodi	Highveld Lions	208
Neil McKenzie	Highveld Lions	176
Jacques Rudolph	Titans	172
Henry Davids	Titans	162

- Source: CricInfo

=== Most wickets ===
Player	Team	Wickets
Mitchell Starc	Sydney Sixers	14
Azhar Mahmood	Auckland Aces	10
Aaron Phangiso	Highveld Lions	10
Lasith Malinga	Mumbai Indians	8
Moisés Henriques	Sydney Sixers	8

- Source: CricInfo
