= Champions League 2012 =

Champions League 2012 may refer to:

- 2012 AFC Champions League
- 2012 CAF Champions League
- 2011–12 UEFA Champions League
- 2012–13 UEFA Champions League
- 2011–12 CONCACAF Champions League
- 2012–13 CONCACAF Champions League
- 2012 Champions League Twenty20
