= 2013 Champions League =

2013 Champions League may refer to:

== Football ==
- 2012–13 UEFA Champions League
- 2013–14 UEFA Champions League
- 2013 AFC Champions League
- 2013 CAF Champions League

== Cricket ==
- 2013 Champions League Twenty20
