= 2013 Champions League Twenty20 =

International cricket tournament

- Dates: 17 September 2013 – 6 October 2013
- Administrators: BCCI; Cricket Australia; Cricket South Africa
- Cricket format: Twenty20
- Tournament format(s): Round-robin and knockout
- Host: India
- Champions: Mumbai Indians (2nd title)
- Runners-up: Rajasthan Royals
- Participants: 10
- Matches: 23
- Player of the series: Dwayne Smith
- Most runs: Ajinkya Rahane (288 runs)
- Most wickets: Pravin Tambe (12 wickets)
- Official website: www.clt20.com

The 2013 Champions League Twenty20 was the fifth edition of Champions League Twenty20, an international Twenty20 cricket tournament. It was held in India from 17 September to 6 October 2013.

Sydney Sixers were the defending champions, but failed to qualify for the event. Mumbai Indians won their second title, defeating Rajasthan Royals by 33 runs in the final.

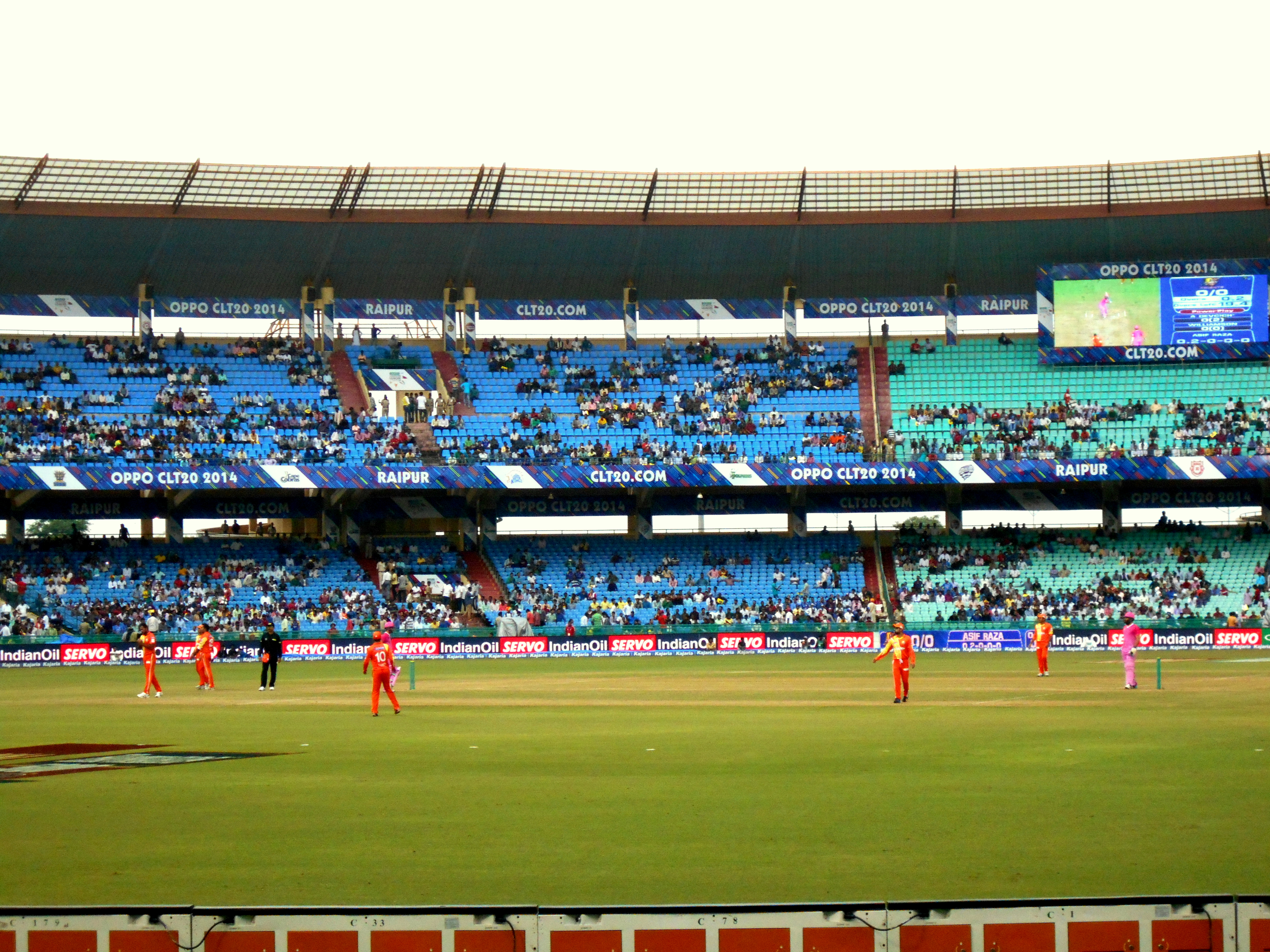
CLT20 match at Naya Raipur Stadium in 2013 season

== Format ==
The tournament featured a qualifying stage and group stage. During the qualifying stage, four teams played a round-robin tournament with the top two teams qualifying for the final stage. These two teams join the eight teams that received direct entry in the final stage in two groups of five teams. The top two teams from each group advanced to the knockout stage

== Qualification ==
English county cricket teams refused to participate due to the competition clashing with the end of the County Championship. Trinidad and Tobago received direct qualification to the final stage for the first time. The winners of the Sri Lanka Premier League were originally scheduled to participate in the qualifying stage before the Sri Lankan tournament was cancelled.

== Teams ==
Cricket Board	Team	How qualified
Australia	Brisbane Heat	Winners, 2012–13 Big Bash League
Australia	Perth Scorchers	Runners-up, 2012–13 Big Bash League
India	Chennai Super Kings	Runners-up, 2013 Indian Premier League
India	Mumbai Indians	Winners, 2013 Indian Premier League
India	Rajasthan Royals	Third-ranked, 2013 Indian Premier League
India	Sunrisers Hyderabad	Qualifying stage
New Zealand	Otago Volts	Qualifying stage
South Africa	Highveld Lions	Winners, 2012–13 Ram Slam T20 Challenge
South Africa	Titans	Runners-up, 2012–13 Ram Slam T20 Challenge
West Indies	Trinidad and Tobago	Winners, 2012–13 Caribbean Twenty20

== Qualifying stage ==
Pos	Team	Pld	W	L	NR	Pts	NRR
1	Otago Volts (1)	3	3	0	0	12	1.225
2	Sunrisers Hyderabad (2)	3	2	1	0	8	0.207
3	Faisalabad Wolves	3	1	2	0	4	−0.525
4	Kandurata Maroons	3	0	3	0	0	−0.809

- 1 Advanced to Group A
- 2 Advanced to Group B

17 September
16:00 (D/N)
Scorecard

Faisalabad Wolves; 139/8 (20 overs)	v	Otago Volts; 142/2 (17.5 overs)
Misbah-ul-Haq 46 (34); Ian Butler 2/23 (4 overs)		Brendon McCullum 83* (65); Samiullah Khan 1/18 (3 overs)

Otago Volts won by 8 wickets
Punjab Cricket Association Stadium, Mohali, Chandigarh
Umpires: Richard Illingworth (Eng) and Paul Reiffel (Aus)
Player of the match: Brendon McCullum (Otago)

- Faisalabad Wolves won the toss and elected to bat.

17 September
20:00 (D/N)
Scorecard

Kandurata Maroons; 168/3 (20 overs)	v	Sunrisers Hyderabad; 174/2 (18.3 overs)
Kumar Sangakkara 61* (46); Ishant Sharma 2/20 (4 overs)		Shikhar Dhawan 71 (53); Shehan Jayasuriya 1/25 (4 overs)

Sunrisers Hyderabad won by 8 wickets
Punjab Cricket Association Stadium, Mohali, Chandigarh
Umpires: Richard Illingworth (Eng) and Vineet Kulkarni (Ind)
Player of the match: Shikhar Dhawan (Hyderabad)

- Sunrisers Hyderabad won the toss and elected to field.

18 September
16:00 (D/N)
Scorecard

Kandurata Maroons; 154/9 (20 overs)	v	Otago Volts; 157/4 (18 overs)
Upul Tharanga 76 (56); Ian Butler 3/21 (4 overs)		Ryan ten Doeschate 64 (32); Dilhara Lokuhettige 3/20 (4 overs)

Otago Volts won by 6 wickets
Punjab Cricket Association Stadium, Mohali, Chandigarh
Umpires: Vineet Kulkarni (Ind) and Paul Reiffel (Aus)
Player of the match: Ryan ten Doeschate (Otago)

- Otago Volts won the toss and elected to field.

18 September
20:00 (D/N)
Scorecard

Faisalabad Wolves; 127/5 (20 overs)	v	Sunrisers Hyderabad; 131/3 (17.3 overs)
Misbah-ul-Haq 56* (40); Amit Mishra 1/13 (4 overs)		Shikhar Dhawan 59 (50); Imran Khalid 2/14 (2 overs)

Sunrisers Hyderabad won by 7 wickets
Punjab Cricket Association Stadium, Mohali, Chandigarh
Umpires: Richard Illingworth (Eng) and Paul Reiffel (Aus)
Player of the match: Amit Mishra (Hyderabad)

- Sunrisers Hyderabad won the toss and elected to field.
- As result of this match, Otago Volts advanced to Group A and Sunrisers Hyderabad advanced to Group B.

20 September
16:00 (D/N)
Scorecard

Faisalabad Wolves; 146/6 (20 overs)	v	Kandurata Maroons; 136/7 (20 overs)
Misbah-ul-Haq 93* (60); Dilhara Lokuhettige 3/21 (4 overs)		Kumar Sangakkara 44 (36); Ehsan Adil 3/26 (4 overs)

Faisalabad Wolves won by 10 runs
Punjab Cricket Association Stadium, Mohali, Chandigarh
Umpires: Richard Illingworth (Eng) and Vineet Kulkarni (Ind)
Player of the match: Misbah-ul-Haq (Faisalabad)

- Kandurata Maroons won the toss and elected to field.

20 September
20:00 (D/N)
Scorecard

Sunrisers Hyderabad; 143/5 (20 overs)	v	Otago Volts; 144/5 (16.2 overs)
JP Duminy 57* (38); Nathan McCullum 2/23 (4 overs)		Brendon McCullum 67* (39); Dale Steyn 2/13 (3 overs)

Otago Volts won by 5 wickets
Punjab Cricket Association Stadium, Mohali, Chandigarh
Umpires: Vineet Kulkarni (Ind) and Paul Reiffel (Aus)
Player of the match: Nathan McCullum (Otago)

- Otago Volts won the toss and elected to field.

== Group stage ==
=== Group A ===
Pos	Team	Pld	W	L	NR	Pts	NRR
1	Rajasthan Royals	4	4	0	0	16	0.960
2	Mumbai Indians	4	2	1	1	10	1.068
3	Otago Volts	4	2	1	1	10	0.869
4	Highveld Lions	4	0	3	1	2	−0.726
5	Perth Scorchers	4	0	3	1	2	−2.851

21 September
20:00 (D/N)
Scorecard

Mumbai Indians; 142/7 (20 overs)	v	Rajasthan Royals; 148/3 (19.4 overs)
Rohit Sharma 44 (37); Vikramjeet Malik 3/24 (4 overs)		Sanju Samson 54 (47); Rishi Dhawan 1/17 (4 overs)

Rajasthan Royals won by 7 wickets
Sawai Mansingh Stadium, Jaipur
Attendance : 27,539
Umpires: Bruce Oxenford (Aus) and Rod Tucker (Aus)
Player of the match: Vikramjeet Malik (Rajasthan)

- Rajasthan Royals won the toss and elected to field.

23 September
16:00 (D/N)
Scorecard

Perth Scorchers	v	Highveld Lions

No result
Sardar Patel Stadium, Motera, Ahmedabad
Attendance: 13,388
Umpires: Richard Illingworth (Eng) and Paul Reiffel (Aus)

- Highveld Lions won the toss and elected to field.
- Match abandoned due to rain.

23 September
20:00 (D/N)
Scorecard

Mumbai Indians	v	Otago Volts

Match abandoned without a ball bowled
Sardar Patel Stadium, Motera, Ahmedabad
Attendance: 13,388
Umpires: Anil Chaudhary (Ind) and Richard Illingworth (Eng)

- Match abandoned due to rain.

25 September
16:00 (D/N)
Scorecard

Otago Volts; 242/4 (20 overs)	v	Perth Scorchers; 180/6 (20 overs)
Neil Broom 117* (56); Joel Paris 2/50 (4 overs)		Hilton Cartwright 68* (53); Ian Butler 3/47 (4 overs)

Otago Volts won by 62 runs
Sawai Mansingh Stadium, Jaipur
Attendance: 15,911
Umpires: Kumar Dharmasena (SL) and Chettithody Shamshuddin (Ind)
Player of the match: Neil Broom (Otago)

- Perth Scorchers won the toss and elected to field.

25 September
20:00 (D/N)
Scorecard

Rajasthan Royals; 183/5 (20 overs)	v	Highveld Lions; 153/9 (20 overs)
Brad Hodge 46* (23); Lonwabo Tsotsobe 2/26 (4 overs)		Alviro Petersen 40 (28); Pravin Tambe 4/15 (3 overs)

Rajasthan Royals won by 30 runs
Sawai Mansingh Stadium, Jaipur
Attendance: 23,717
Umpires: Billy Bowden (NZ) and Kumar Dharmasena (SL)
Player of the match: Pravin Tambe (Rajasthan)

- Highveld Lions won the toss and elected to field.

27 September
20:00 (D/N)
Scorecard

Highveld Lions; 140/5 (20 overs)	v	Mumbai Indians; 141/3 (18.3 overs)
Alviro Petersen 35* (27); Pragyan Ojha 2/26 (3 overs)		Dwayne Smith 63* (47); Sohail Tanvir 1/15 (3.3 overs)

Mumbai Indians won by 7 wickets
Sawai Mansingh Stadium, Jaipur
Attendance: 20,491
Umpires: Anil Chaudhary (Ind) and Paul Reiffel (Aus)
Player of the match: Dwayne Smith (Mumbai)

- Mumbai Indians won the toss and elected to field.

29 September
16:00 (D/N)
Scorecard

Highveld Lions; 167/4 (20 overs)	v	Otago Volts; 167/7 (20 overs)
Quinton de Kock 109* (63); Nick Beard 2/31 (3 overs)		Jimmy Neesham 52* (25); Imran Tahir 2/28 (4 overs)

Scores level in match and Super Over; Otago Volts won on boundary count
Sawai Mansingh Stadium, Jaipur
Attendance: 14,618
Umpires: Billy Bowden (NZ) and Anil Chaudhary (Ind)
Player of the match: Jimmy Neesham (Otago)

- Otago Volts won the toss and elected to field.

29 September
20:00 (D/N)
Scorecard

Perth Scorchers; 120 (20 overs)	v	Rajasthan Royals; 121/1 (16.3 overs)
Adam Voges 27 (21); Kevon Cooper 4/18 (4 overs)		Ajinkya Rahane 62* (53); Jason Behrendorff 1/28 (4 overs)

Rajasthan Royals won by 9 wickets
Sawai Mansingh Stadium, Jaipur
Attendance: 17,972
Umpires: Billy Bowden (NZ) and Kumar Dharmasena (SL)
Player of the match: Kevon Cooper (Rajasthan)

- Rajasthan Royals won the toss and elected to field.

1 October
20:00 (D/N)
Scorecard

Otago Volts; 139/7 (20 overs)	v	Rajasthan Royals; 142/6 (19.1 overs)
Jimmy Neesham 32 (25); Rahul Shukla 3/23 (4 overs)		Brad Hodge 52* (23); Jimmy Neesham 3/22 (4 overs)

Rajasthan Royals won by 4 wickets
Sawai Mansingh Stadium, Jaipur
Attendance: 19,222
Umpires: Richard Illingworth (Eng) and Paul Reiffel (Aus)
Player of the match: Rahul Shukla (Rajasthan)

- Rajasthan Royals won the toss and elected to field.

2 October
16:00 (D/N)
Scorecard

Perth Scorchers; 149/6 (20 overs)	v	Mumbai Indians; 152/4 (13.2 overs)
Sam Whiteman 51* (32); Nathan Coulter-Nile 3/19 (4 overs)		Rohit Sharma 51* (24); Brad Hogg 2/26 (3 overs)

Mumbai Indians won by 6 wickets
Feroz Shah Kotla, Delhi
Attendance: 33,103
Umpires: Billy Bowden (NZ) and Kumar Dharmasena (SL)
Player of the match: Rohit Sharma (Mumbai)

- Mumbai Indians won the toss and elected to field.

=== Group B ===
Pos	Team	Pld	W	L	NR	Pts	NRR
1	Trinidad and Tobago	4	3	1	0	12	0.816
2	Chennai Super Kings	4	3	1	0	12	0.271
3	Titans	4	2	2	0	8	0.228
4	Sunrisers Hyderabad	4	1	2	1	6	−0.622
5	Brisbane Heat	4	0	3	1	2	−1.028

22 September
16:00 (D/N)
Scorecard

Trinidad and Tobago; 135/9 (20 overs)	v	Brisbane Heat; 110 (18.4 overs)
Denesh Ramdin 48 (38); Alister McDermott 4/37 (4 overs)		Joe Burns 45 (43); Ravi Rampaul 4/14 (3.4 overs)

Trinidad and Tobago won by 25 runs
JSCA International Stadium Complex, Ranchi
Attendance: 24,743
Umpires: Billy Bowden (NZ) and Kumar Dharmasena (SL)
Player of the match: Denesh Ramdin (T&T)

- Brisbane Heat won the toss and elected to field.

22 September
20:00 (D/N)
Scorecard

Titans; 185/5 (20 overs)	v	Chennai Super Kings; 187/6 (18.5 overs)
AB de Villiers 77 (36); Dwayne Bravo 2/34 (4 overs)		Michael Hussey 47 (26); Rowan Richards 3/29 (3.5 overs)

Chennai Super Kings won by 4 wickets
JSCA International Stadium Complex, Ranchi
Attendance: 34,223
Umpires: Billy Bowden (NZ) and Chettithody Shamsuddin (Ind)
Player of the match: Suresh Raina (Chennai)

- Chennai Super Kings won the toss and elected to field.

24 September
16:00 (D/N)
Scorecard

Titans; 123 (18.5 overs)	v	Brisbane Heat; 119 (20 overs)
Henry Davids 39 (31); Matthew Gale 4/10 (2.5 overs)		James Hopes 37 (44); Marchant de Lange 3/13 (4 overs)

Titans won by 4 runs
Punjab Cricket Association Stadium, Mohali, Chandigarh
Attendance: 12,616
Umpires: Bruce Oxenford (Aus) and S.Ravi (Ind)
Player of the match: Marchant de Lange (Titans)

- Brisbane Heat won the toss and elected to field.

24 September
20:00 (D/N)
Scorecard

Trinidad and Tobago; 160/8 (20 overs)	v	Sunrisers Hyderabad; 164/6 (19.3 overs)
Darren Bravo 66 (44); Darren Sammy 2/21 (4 overs)		Thisara Perera 57* (32); Sunil Narine 4/9 (4 overs)

Sunrisers Hyderabad won by 4 wickets
Punjab Cricket Association Stadium, Mohali, Chandigarh
Attendance: 16,299
Umpires: S.Ravi (Ind) and Rod Tucker (Aus)
Player of the match: Thisara Perera (Hyderabad)

- Sunrisers Hyderabad won the toss and elected to field.

26 September
20:00 (D/N)
Scorecard

Chennai Super Kings; 202/4 (20 overs)	v	Sunrisers Hyderabad; 190/7 (20 overs)
Suresh Raina 84 (57); Dale Steyn 2/23 (4 overs)		Darren Sammy 50 (25); Dwayne Bravo 2/34 (4 overs)

Chennai Super Kings won by 12 runs
JSCA International Stadium Complex, Ranchi
Attendance: 32,783
Umpires: Bruce Oxenford (Aus) and Rod Tucker (Aus)
Player of the match: Suresh Raina (Chennai)

- Sunrisers Hyderabad won the toss and elected to field.

28 September
16:00 (D/N)
Scorecard

Sunrisers Hyderabad; 145/7 (20 overs)	v	Titans; 147/2 (16.3 overs)
Shikhar Dhawan 37 (21); David Wiese 3/17 (4 overs)		Henry Davids 64 (42); Dale Steyn 1/23 (4 overs)

Titans won by 8 wickets
JSCA International Stadium Complex, Ranchi
Attendance: 28,347
Umpires: Bruce Oxenford (Aus) and S.Ravi (Ind)
Player of the match: Henry Davids (Titans)

- Titans won the toss and elected to field.

28 September
20:00 (D/N)
Scorecard

Brisbane Heat; 137/7 (20 overs)	v	Chennai Super Kings; 140/2 (15.5 overs)
Ben Cutting 42* (25); Ravindra Jadeja 2/18 (4 overs)		Michael Hussey 57* (48); Daniel Christian 1/16 (3 overs)

Chennai Super Kings won by 8 wickets
JSCA International Stadium Complex, Ranchi
Attendance: 36,210
Umpires: S.Ravi (Ind) and Rod Tucker (Aus)
Player of the match: Michael Hussey (Chennai)

- Chennai Super Kings won the toss and elected to field.

30 September
16:00 (D/N)
Scorecard

Trinidad and Tobago; 188/6 (20 overs)	v	Titans; 153/6 (17 overs)
Evin Lewis 70 (35); Marchant de Lange 3/38 (4 overs)		Henry Davids 42 (22); Lendl Simmons 2/18 (3 overs)

Trinidad and Tobago won by 6 runs (D/L)
Sardar Patel Stadium, Motera, Ahmedabad
Attendance: 15,770
Umpires: Bruce Oxenford (Aus) and Rod Tucker (Aus)
Player of the match: Evin Lewis (T&T)

- Titans won the toss and elected to field.
- Rain stopped play during the Titans' innings. Their par score after 17 overs was 159 runs according to the Duckworth–Lewis method.

30 September
20:00 (D/N)
Scorecard

Brisbane Heat	v	Sunrisers Hyderabad

Match abandoned without a ball bowled
Sardar Patel Stadium, Motera, Ahmedabad
Umpires: Bruce Oxenford (Aus) and S.Ravi (Ind)

- Sunrisers Hyderabad won the toss and elected to field
- Match abandoned due to rain.

2 October
20:00 (D/N)
Scorecard

Chennai Super Kings; 118 (19.4 overs)	v	Trinidad and Tobago; 119/2 (15.1 overs)
Suresh Raina 38 (29); Rayad Emrit 3/21 (3.4 overs)		Lendl Simmons 63 (41); Suresh Raina 1/16 (4 overs)

Trinidad and Tobago won by 8 wickets
Feroz Shah Kotla, Delhi
Attendance: 37,390
Umpires: Billy Bowden (NZ) and Chettithody Shamsuddin (Ind)
Player of the match: Lendl Simmons (T&T)

- Trinidad and Tobago won the toss and elected to field.

== Knockout stage ==
Semifinals
A1	Rajasthan Royals	159/8 (20 ov)
B2	Chennai Super Kings	145/8 (20 ov)
A2	Mumbai Indians	157/4 (19.1 ov)
B1	Trinidad and Tobago	153/5 (20 ov)

Final
A1	Rajasthan Royals	169 (18.5 ov)
A2	Mumbai Indians	202/6 (20 ov)

Semi-finals

Semi-final
4 October
20:00 (D/N)
Scorecard

Rajasthan Royals; 159/8 (20 overs)	v	Chennai Super Kings; 145/8 (20 overs)
Ajinkya Rahane 70 (56); Dwayne Bravo 3/26 (4 overs)		Ravichandran Ashwin 46 (28); Pravin Tambe 3/10 (4 overs)

Rajasthan Royals won by 14 runs
Sawai Mansingh Stadium, Jaipur
Attendance: 30,000
Umpires: Billy Bowden (NZ) and Bruce Oxenford (Aus)
Player of the match: Pravin Tambe (Rajasthan)

- Chennai Super Kings won the toss and elected to field

Semi-final
5 October
20:00 (D/N)
Scorecard

Trinidad and Tobago; 153/5 (20 overs)	v	Mumbai Indians; 157/4 (19.1 overs)
Evin Lewis 62 (46); Pragyan Ojha 1/16 (4 overs)		Dwayne Smith 59 (38); Sunil Narine 3/17 (4 overs)

Mumbai Indians won by 6 wickets
Feroz Shah Kotla, Delhi
Attendance: 37,857
Umpires: Kumar Dharmasena (Sri Lanka) and Rod Tucker (Australia)
Player of the match: Dwayne Smith

- Mumbai Indians, who chose to field

Final

Final
6 October
20:00 (D/N)
Scorecard

Mumbai Indians; 202/6 (20 overs)	v	Rajasthan Royals; 169 (18.5 overs)
Dwayne Smith 44 (39); Pravin Tambe 2/19 (4 overs)		Ajinkya Rahane 65 (47); Harbhajan Singh 4/32 (4 overs)

Mumbai Indians won by 33 runs
Feroz Shah Kotla, Delhi
Attendance: 40,000
Umpires: Kumar Dharmasena (Sri Lanka) and Rod Tucker (Australia)
Player of the match: Harbhajan Singh

- Rajasthan Royals won the toss and elected to field

== Statistics ==
=== Most runs ===
The following were the top five highest run scorers in the tournament:

Player	Team	Runs
Ajinkya Rahane	Rajasthan Royals	288
Shikhar Dhawan	Sunrisers Hyderabad	250
Dwayne Smith	Mumbai Indians	223
Suresh Raina	Chennai Super Kings	221
Evin Lewis	Trinidad and Tobago	211

- Source: Champions League T20

=== Most wickets ===
The following were the five leading wicket-takers of the tournament.

Player	Team	Wickets
Pravin Tambe	Rajasthan Royals	12
Sunil Narine	Trinidad and Tobago	11
Ian Butler	Otago	8
Dwayne Bravo	Chennai Super Kings	7
Marchant de Lange	Titans	7

Source: Champions League T20
