= Athenkosi Dyili =

South African cricketer (born 1984)

Personal information
- Born: 17 July 1984 (age 42); King William's Town, South Africa
- Source: Cricinfo, 6 December 2020

Athenkosi Dyili (born 17 July 1984) is a South African former cricketer. He played in 82 first-class, 70 List A, and 33 Twenty20 matches from 2004 to 2014.
