= CSA T20 Challenge =

South African cricket tournament

T20 Challenge
- Countries: South Africa
- Administrator: Cricket South Africa
- Format: Twenty20
- First edition: 2003–04
- Latest edition: 2025–26
- Next edition: 2026–27
- Tournament format: Double round-robin, qualifier and final
- Number of teams: 8
- Current champion: Warriors (2 titles)
- Most successful: Titans (6 titles) Lions (6 titles)
- 2025–26 CSA T20 Challenge

The CSA T20 Challenge is a domestic Twenty20 Cricket competition in South Africa, first contested in the 2003–04 season. It was previously known as the Standard Bank Pro20 Series until the 2010–11 season, the MiWay T20 Challenge for the 2011–12 season and most recently as the RamSlam T20 Challenge. The current champions are the Imperial Lions, whilst the Titans have been the most successful with 6 title wins. In 2025, had its last edition, and it was replaced in 2026 by the Pro20 Cup.

The tournament has been contested since its inception by the six franchise teams but for the 2007–08 season, Zimbabwe took part as a seventh team. In April 2019, Cricket South Africa announced that the 2018–19 tournament would be the final edition of the T20 Challenge, due to austerity measures and a restructure of domestic cricket in the country. The competition was effectively replaced as a top cricket league with a franchise-based T20 tournament, the Mzansi Super League, which had its first edition in 2018.

The tournament was however played during February 2021, with all the matches taking place at the Kingsmead Cricket Ground in Durban. It replaced the 2020 edition of the Mzansi Super League, which was cancelled due to the COVID-19 pandemic.

The competition was discontinued following the 2025–26 season as part of Cricket South Africa's restructuring of domestic cricket. From the 2026–27 season, the T20 Challenge and T20 Knockout competitions were merged into a new competition, the Pro20 Cup.

== Teams ==
Current teams
Team	Location	City	Province	Capacity	Wins
Dolphins	Kingsmead	Durban	KwaZulu-Natal	25,000	2
Knights	City Oval	Pietermaritzburg	KwaZulu-Natal	12,000	
Warriors	St George's Park	Port Elizabeth	Eastern Cape	19,000	1
Titans	Super Sport Park	Centurion	Gauteng	22,000	6
Lions	Wanderers Stadium	Johannesburg	Gauteng	34,000	6
North West Dragons	Senwes Park	Potchefstroom	North West	18,000	
Boland	Boland Park	Paarl	Western Cape	10,000	1
Western Province	Newlands	Cape Town	Western Cape	25,000	

Former teams:

- Zimbabwe (2007–08 season)
- Impi (2011–12 season)
- Cape Cobra (season)

== Tournament results ==
Tournament	Final venue	Final			Format	Matches	Teams
Tournament	Final venue	Winner	Result	Runner-up	Format	Matches	Teams
Standard Bank Pro20
2003–04; Fixtures	Buffalo Park, East London	Eagles; 131 for 6 (20 overs)	won by 7 runs (D/L); Scorecard	Eastern Cape; 108 for 9 (17 overs)	Single round-robin; Semi-finals and final	18	6
2004–05; Fixtures	SuperSport Park, Centurion	Titans; 125 for 2 (17 overs)	won by 8 wickets Scorecard	Warriors; 121 all out (19 overs)	Single round-robin; Semi-finals and final	18	6
2005–06; Fixtures	Goodyear Park, Bloemfontein	Eagles; 113 for 4 (15.4 overs)	won by 6 wickets Scorecard	Cape Cobras; 112 for 7 (20 overs)	Single round-robin; Semi-finals and final	18	6
2006–07; Fixtures	New Wanderers Stadium, Johannesburg	Highveld Lions; 148 for 4 (17.4 overs)	won by 6 wickets Scorecard	Cape Cobras; 147 for 9 (20 overs)	Single round-robin; Semi-finals and final	18	6
2007–08; Fixtures	Kingsmead, Durban	Titans; 153 for 6 (20 overs)	won by 18 runs Scorecard	Dolphins; 135 all out (19.1 overs)	Single round-robin; Semi-finals and final	24	7
2008–09; Details	Newlands, Cape Town	Cape Cobras; 147 for 5 (20 overs)	won by 22 runs Scorecard	Eagles; 128 for 8 (20 overs)	Single round-robin; Best-2-out-of-3 semi-finals and single final	22	9
2009–10; Details	St George's Oval, Port Elizabeth	Warriors; 186 for 2 (20 overs)	won by 82 runs Scorecard	Highveld Lions; 104 all out (17.5 overs)	Single round-robin; Best-2-out-of-3 semi-finals and single final	20	9
2010–11; Details	Newlands, Cape Town	Cape Cobras; 166 for 5 (20 overs)	won by 12 runs Scorecard	Warriors; 154 for 6 (20 overs)	Single round-robin; Best-2-out-of-3 semi-finals and single final	20	9
MiWay T20 Challenge
2011–12; Details	New Wanderers Stadium, Johannesburg	Titans; 187 for 6 (20 overs)	won by 45 runs Scorecard	Highveld Lions; 142 all out (18.5 overs)	Double round-robin; Qualifier and final	44	7
Ram Slam T20 Challenge
2012–13; Details	New Wanderers Stadium, Johannesburg	Highveld Lions; 155 for 5 (20 overs)	won by 30 runs Scorecard	Titans; 125 all out (18.1 overs)	Double round-robin; Qualifier and final	32	6
2013–14; Details	Newlands, Cape Town	Dolphins; 146 for 8 (20 overs)	won by 2 runs Scorecard	Cape Cobras; 144 for 7 (20 overs)	Double round-robin; semi-finals and final	33	6
2014–15; Details	Newlands, Cape Town	Cape Cobras; 158 for 4 (20 overs)	won by 33 runs Scorecard	Knights; 125/9 (20 overs)	Double round-robin; semi-finals and final	32	6
2015–16; Details	SuperSport Park, Centurion	Titans; 161 for 3 (20 overs)	won by 7 wickets Scorecard	Dolphins; 159 for 5 (20 overs)	Double round-robin; semi-finals and final	32	6
CSA T20 Challenge
2016–17; Details	SuperSport Park, Centurion	Titans; 155 for 6 (20 overs)	won by 6 runs Scorecard	Warriors; 149 for 6 (20 overs)	Double round-robin; semi-finals and final	32	6
2017–18; Details	SuperSport Park, Centurion	Titans; 101 for 3 (11.1 overs)	won by 7 wickets Scorecard	Dolphins; 100 all out (18.3 overs)	Double round-robin; semi-finals and final	32	6
2018–19; Details	New Wanderers Stadium, Johannesburg	Lions; 203 for 4 (20 overs)	won by 11 runs Scorecard	Warriors; 192 all out (19.2 overs)	Double round-robin; semi-finals and final	32	6
2020–21; Details	Kingsmead Cricket Ground, Durban	Imperial Lions; 108 for 6 (19 overs)	won by 4 wickets Scorecard	Dolphins; 107 for 7 (20 overs)	Round-robin and Final	17	6
2021–22; Details	St George's Park, Port Elizabeth	Rocks; 138 for 6 (20 overs)	won by 15 runs Scorecard	Titans; 123 for 9 (20 overs)	Round-robin and knockout	31	8
2022-23; Details	Senwes Park, Potchefstroom	Titans; 165 for 6 (19.4 overs)	won by 4 wickets Scorecard	Dolphins; 162 for 3 (20 overs)	Round-robin and knockout	31	8
2023-24; Details	The Wanderers Stadium, Johannesburg	Lions; 168 for 3 (17.4 overs)	won by 7 wickets Scorecard	Dolphins; 165 for 8 (20 overs)	Round-robin and knockout	58	8
2024-25; Details	Wanderers Stadium, Johannesburg	Lions; 124 for 2 (15.1 overs)	won by 8 wickets Scorecard	Titans; 119 all out (19.2 overs)	Round-robin and knockout	33	8
2025-26; Details	Boland Park, Paarl	Warriors; 142 for 6 (20 overs)	Match tied (Warriors won the second Super Over); Scorecard	Boland; 142 for 6 (20 overs)	Round-robin and knockout	32	8
Pro20 Cup
2026-27; Details

Notes

- Starting with the 2008–09 season until the 2013–14 season, the winning and runner-up teams would qualify for the Champions League Twenty20.

== Ground ==
Cape Town	Centurion	Durban	Pietermaritzburg
Newlands Cricket Ground	Centurion Park	Kingsmead Cricket Ground	City Oval
Capacity: 25,000	Capacity: 22,000	Capacity: 25,000	Capacity: 12,000
CSA T20 Challenge (South Africa)
Gqeberha	Johannesburg	Paarl	Cape Town
St George's Park Cricket Ground	Wanderers Stadium	Boland Park	Cape Town Stadium
Capacity: 19,000	Capacity: 34,000	Capacity: 10,000	Capacity: 57,000
