= Alistair Gray =

South African cricketer (born 1982)

Alistair John Alec Gray (born 8 July 1982, in Johannesburg) is a South African first-class cricketer for the Cape Cobras. He is a right-handed opening batsman as well as a right arm leg spin bowler. He made his first-class debut in 2004–05 and has made 1849 runs with an average of 35.55.
