= CJ de Villiers =

South African cricketer (born 1986)

Personal information
- Full name: Cornelius Johannes du Preez de Villiers
- Born: 16 March 1986 (age 40); Kroonstad, Orange Free State Province, South Africa
- Batting: Right-handed
- Bowling: Right-arm fast-medium
- Role: Bowler

Domestic team information
- Years: Team
- 2006/07–2009/10: Free State
- 2010/11–2013/14: Titans (squad no. 10)
- FC debut: 26 October 2006 Free State v Namibia
- Last FC: 9 February 2012 Titans v Dolphins
- LA debut: 5 November 2006 Free State v Northerns
- Last LA: 18 March 2012 Northerns v KwaZulu-Natal

Career statistics
Competition	FC	LA	T20
Matches	59	41	25
Runs scored	1,295	243	74
Batting average	17.98	16.20	14.80
100s/50s	0/6	0/0	0/0
Top score	84	36	18
Balls bowled	9,717	1,670	485
Wickets	176	49	31
Bowling average	29.85	32.65	19.00
5 wickets in innings	3	1	1
10 wickets in match	0	0	0
Best bowling	5/36	5/39	5/12
Catches/stumpings	20/–	10/–	5/–
- Source: Cricinfo, 3 June 2012

Cornelius Johannes du Preez de Villiers, also known as CJ de Villiers (born 16 March 1986) is a South African cricketer. He is a tall (6'4") right-handed batsman and a right-arm fast-medium bowler, who plays for Free State and Titans cricket teams.

== Career ==
de Villiers made his first-class debut in 2006, scoring a total of 49 runs and taking one wicket for Free State in a match against Namibia. He followed 19 wickets in his debut season with a haul of forty in 2007–08, which left him as the sixth highest wicket-taker of the season.

In 2008 de Villiers played in South Africa A's unofficial Test series against Sri Lanka A, taking 5 for 36 during Sri Lanka's first innings in the second match.
