= Ethan O'Reilly =

South African cricketer (born 1985)

Ethan O'Reilly (born 27 December 1985) is a South African cricketer. He is a right-handed batsman and a right-arm fast bowler who plays for Gauteng. He was born in Port Elizabeth.

O'Reilly made his first-class debut for the team in 2008, in a game against Eastern Province. Batting from the tailend, O'Reilly scored a commendable 42 not out in his debut innings, partnering Dane Vilas to a ninth-wicket stand of 108 runs. He was included in the Eastern Province cricket team squad for the 2015 Africa T20 Cup.
