= Alfonso Thomas =

South African cricketer

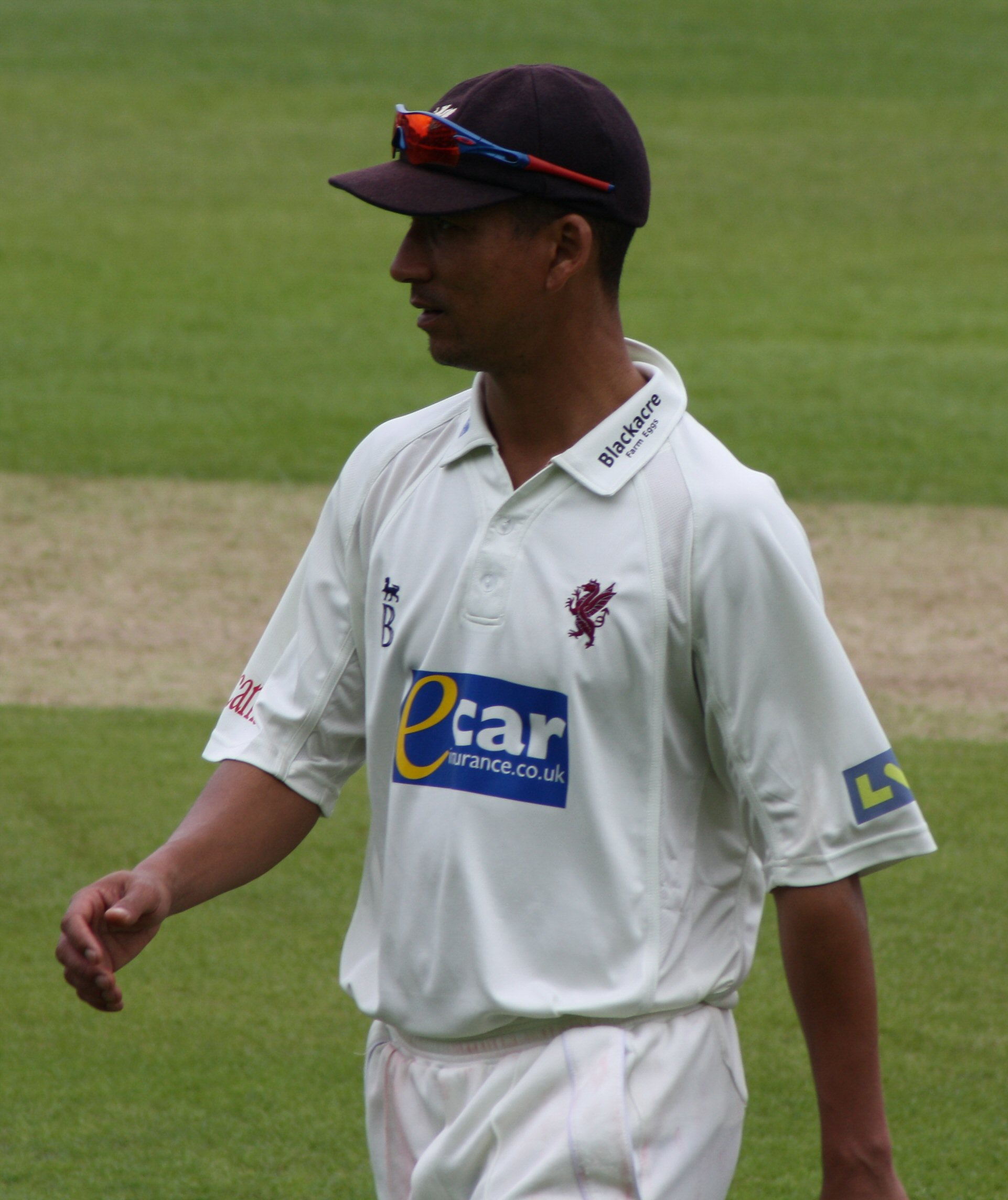

Personal information
- Full name: Alfonso Clive Thomas
- Born: 9 February 1977 (age 49); Cape Town, South Africa
- Batting: Right-handed
- Bowling: Right-arm fast-medium
- Role: Bowler

International information
- National side: South Africa (2007)
- Only T20I (cap 26): 2 February 2007 v Pakistan

Domestic team information
- Years: Team
- 2000–2003: North West
- 2003–2006: Northerns
- 2004–2007: Titans
- 2005: Staffordshire
- 2007: Warwickshire
- 2007–2010: Dolphins
- 2008–2015: Somerset (squad no. 8)
- 2015: → Sussex (on loan)
- 2011: Lions
- 2011–2012: Pune Warriors
- 2011–2012: Adelaide Strikers
- 2012–2013: Titans
- 2012–2014: Perth Scorchers
- 2013: Dhaka Gladiators

Career statistics
Competition	T20I	FC	LA	T20
Matches	1	164	169	225
Runs scored	–	4,130	727	410
Batting average	–	23.07	16.90	12.05
100s/50s	–	2/14	0/0	0/0
Top score	–	119*	49*	30*
Balls bowled	24	29,790	7,195	4,558
Wickets	3	547	219	263
Bowling average	8.33	26.34	28.64	21.81
5 wickets in innings	0	25	0	1
10 wickets in match	0	2	0	0
Best bowling	3/25	7/54	4/18	5/24
Catches/stumpings	0/–	43/–	35/–	67/–
- Source: CricketArchive, 30 September 2015

Alfonso Clive Thomas (born 9 February 1977) is a South African former professional cricketer. He is a right arm fast-medium bowler and a big hitting lower-order batsman. Playing in South African domestic cricket for North West, Northerns, the Titans, the Lions, and the Dolphins, Thomas has also played English county cricket for Warwickshire and Somerset, Indian Premier League matches for the Pune Warriors, and in Australian domestic cricket for the Adelaide Strikers and the Perth Scorchers. In June 2014, Thomas took four wickets in four balls in a County Championship game against Sussex. He was a pioneer of death bowling in the early years of T20 cricket.

== Career ==
=== South African domestic career ===
Thomas made his first-class debut playing for Western Province B in Newlands, Cape Town in the 1998/99 season. In three first-class matches for Western Province B, he took two wickets, and did not play another first-class match until the 2000/01 season after a move to North West. His North West and SuperSport Series debut came against Gauteng, where he finished with match figures of 6/120. Thomas scored his maiden century only two games later, hitting 106 not out while batting at number ten, setting a record tenth wicket partnership for North West of 174 with Garth Roe as he did so. Four months later, Thomas was involved in another record breaking partnership for North West. With the team at 87/7 against Western Province, Thomas joined Morne Strydom at the crease. 492 balls later when Strydom was caught by Neil Johnson, the pair had added 204 to the score; Thomas eventually going on to score 95 not out. The following match, Thomas achieved his first five-wicket haul in first-class cricket, as he took the wickets of Easterns top five batsmen during a ten wicket victory; finishing the innings with 6/26.

Thomas started the 2001/02 season on top form, claiming five-wickets in an innings on three occasions in the first five games, against Boland, Western Province, and Griqualand West. He represented South Africa in the Hong Kong International Cricket Sixes in November 2001, having a stand-out performance in a Pool One match against Hong Kong as he took 2/4 in his over. He finished the 2001/02 season as North West's leading wicket-taker, with 35 wickets at an average of 22.14. His form saw him picked for South African Board President's XI and South Africa A to play the touring India A side. In a shortened 2002/03 South African domestic season due to the ICC Cricket World Cup 2003, Thomas only appeared in three first-class and five one-day matches for North West, although he did once more represent South Africa in the Hong Kong International Cricket Sixes. He made his second career century against Northerns, making 119*.

He moved to Northerns for the start of the 2003/04 season and had immediate success with 36 wickets in his eight SuperSport Series matches. His debut for the club, in which he took three wickets and three catches during Western Province's first innings to help restrict them to 173, was overshadowed by future Somerset teammate Charl Willoughby, who took 7/56 & 4/56 to earn himself man of the match. In the Standard Bank Cup, Thomas' 17 wickets helped the club finish third in the league, which saw them qualify for the semi-finals. The 2003/04 season also saw the introduction of Twenty20 cricket in South Africa in the form of the Standard Bank Pro20 Series. Thomas represented Titans, a re-branded team merging Northerns and Easterns. He finished the Pro20 season with five wickets from six matches, including three vital dismissals in the group match against Eagles, when he claimed the wickets of Eagles' top three batsmen in his first two overs, helping to lead his team to a 90 run victory.

Since then he has constantly represented South Africa A and was part of the Test tour to India, standing in for an injured André Nel.

He has represented South Africa in a Twenty20 International, taking 3/25

=== English county career ===
In August 2007, Thomas signed as Warwickshire's fourth overseas player of the season, playing nine matches for them through August and September. The following summer, he signed for Somerset under the Kolpak ruling. At the end of the 2015 season, it was announced that Thomas' contract with Somerset would not be renewed.

==== 2009 Champions League Twenty20 ====
In their first match of the 2009 Champions League Twenty20, Thomas played a good lower-middle order innings to guide Somerset to a victory over Deccan Chargers. When Thomas came in, Somerset required 55 runs off the remaining 37 balls of the match. A record eighth wicket partnership for the club meant that when James Hildreth lost his wicket from the first ball of the final over, Somerset needed five runs off as many balls. The following ball resulted in no score, and then the wicket of number ten Max Waller. This wicket allowed Thomas on strike, and he struck a boundary off the fourth ball of the over, and then after a near run out involving number eleven Charl Willoughby, Thomas hit another four from the final ball to grant Somerset the win.

=== Australian domestic cricket ===
Thomas was signed to the Adelaide Strikers for the inaugural 2011–12 season of the Big Bash League, as one of the franchise's two international players. He played in all of Adelaide's seven matches in the tournament (one of three players to do so), taking five wickets at an average of 35.40. His best bowling figures during the tournament, 3/24, were taken in a loss to the Sydney Sixers at the Adelaide Oval. Thomas did not re-sign with Adelaide for the 2012–13 season, instead signing with the Perth Scorchers as a replacement for Albie Morkel, who had not received a clearance from Cricket South Africa. In eight matches during the tournament, he took twelve wickets at an average of 14.91, leading Perth's wicket-taking and finishing fourth in the competition's wicket-taking, behind Ben Laughlin (14 wickets), Lasith Malinga, and Ben Cutting (both 13 wickets). Thomas' best figures, 4/8, were taken in the game against the Melbourne Renegades at the WACA Ground, which are also his best in all Twenty20 matches.

== Coaching career ==
In February 2018, Thomas was appointed bowling coach for the West Indies.

In February 2019, Thomas was appointed bowling coach for Hampshire.

Between 2016 and 2019 he was the cricket development lead and coach at the public school Downside School.

He was appointed head coach of Leicestershire County Cricket Club in November 2023.
