= Gerrie Pienaar =

South African cricket umpire (born 1959)

Personal information
- Born: 28 April 1959 (age 67); Johannesburg, South Africa

Umpiring information
- WODIs umpired: 7 (2004–2005)
- Source: Cricinfo, 2 March 2017

Gerrie Pienaar (born 28 April 1959) is a South African cricket umpire. He has stood in matches in the 2016–17 Sunfoil 3-Day Cup and the 2016–17 CSA Provincial One-Day Challenge tournaments.

In October 2019, he was selected as one of three match referee for the 2019 ICC T20 World Cup Qualifier.
