= Jean Symes =

South African cricketer (born 1986)

- Born: 13 November 1986 (age 39)
- Education: St. John's College (Houghton)
- Occupation: cricketer

Jean Symes (born 13 November 1986 in Johannesburg) is a South African former cricketer who played for Gauteng and Scotland.

After matriculating at St. John's College (Houghton), he represented his country at the under-19 level.

Symes was a member of the Gauteng side which won the 2006–07 SAA Provincial Challenge. He was the leading run scorer in the competition after the home and away season with 847 runs at 70.58. In the final he added to that tally with a second innings score of 93 to help his side to a 95 run victory. Earlier in the season he made an impressive run a ball 193 against Free State at Goodyear Park.

Symes also had success in the limited overs arena, with an innings of 170 in October 2006 which broke the record for the highest ever score by a Gauteng batsman, beating Clive Rice's 169.

He signed as Scotland's overseas pro for the 2012–13 season and immediately excelled scoring 110* against Durham added with useful left-arm spin and excellent fielding.

On 8 August 2016, Symes was banned from cricket for a period of 7 years by Cricket South Africa for breaches of the Anti-Corruption code relating to match fixing.
