= Adrian Holdstock =

South African cricket umpire

Personal information
- Full name: Adrian Thomas Holdstock
- Born: 27 April 1970 (age 56); Cape Town, Cape Province, South Africa
- Batting: Right-handed
- Bowling: Right-arm medium
- Role: Umpire

Domestic team information
- Years: Team
- 1989/90–1992/93: Western Province
- 1993/94–1995/96: Boland

Umpiring information
- Tests umpired: 21 (2020–2025)
- ODIs umpired: 66 (2013–2026)
- T20Is umpired: 60 (2011–2026)
- WODIs umpired: 17 (2009–2018)
- WT20Is umpired: 7 (2009–2019)

Career statistics
Competition	FC	LA
Matches	16	7
Runs scored	573	104
Batting average	20.46	14.85
100s/50s	0/3	0/1
Top score	81	66
Balls bowled	1210	258
Wickets	19	6
Bowling average	33.78	34.83
5 wickets in innings	0	0
10 wickets in match	0	0
Best bowling	4/51	3/54
Catches/stumpings	9/–	2/–
- Source: Cricinfo, 24 November 2023

Adrian Holdstock (born 27 April 1970) is a South African cricket umpire and former cricketer who now serves as an ICC international cricket umpire. He is part of Cricket South Africa's umpire panel for first-class matches.

== Career ==
Holdstock played for Western Province between 1989 and 1993 before playing for Boland from 1993 to 1995. After retiring as a cricketer, Holdstock took up umpiring. He made his list A umpiring debut in 2006 and his first class debut in 2007.

In 2011, Holdstock made his international Twenty20 debut. He umpired in three One Day International games in 2013. In January 2020, he was named as one of the sixteen umpires for the 2020 Under-19 Cricket World Cup tournament in South Africa.

On 26 December 2020, Holdstock stood in his first Test match as an umpire, in the first Test between South Africa and Sri Lanka.

He was selected as one of the match officials for 2021 ICC Men's T20 World Cup. In March 2023, Holdstock and Ahsan Raza from Pakistan were inducted into the Elite Panel of ICC Umpires after Aleem Dar left the panel.

He was one of the sixteen match officials for 2023 Cricket World Cup.

== See also ==
- List of Test cricket umpires
- List of One Day International cricket umpires
- List of Twenty20 International cricket umpires
