= Murray Brown (umpire) =

South African cricket umpire (1966–2024)

Personal information
- Full name: Murray Welsh Brown
- Born: 16 September 1966; Grahamstown, Cape Province, South Africa
- Died: 8 February 2024 (aged 57)

Umpiring information
- Source: ESPNcricinfo, 21 October 2016

Murray Welsh Brown (16 September 1966 – 8 February 2024) was a South African cricket umpire. He stood in matches in the Sunfoil Series tournament. He was part of Cricket South Africa's umpire panel for first-class matches. Between 2002 and 2022 he umpired 154 first-class matches.
