= Ian Howell =

South African cricketer and umpire (born 1958)

Personal information
- Full name: Ian Lester Howell
- Born: 20 May 1958 (age 68); Port Elizabeth, Cape Province, South Africa
- Batting: Left-handed
- Bowling: Left-arm medium

Domestic team information
- Years: Team
- 1981–1984: Eastern Province
- 1984–1998: Border
- FC debut: 7 November 1981 Eastern Province B v Border
- Last FC: 26 February 1998 Border v Northerns
- LA debut: 21 November 1981 Eastern Province v Boland
- Last LA: 3 January 1998 Border v Gauteng

Umpiring information
- Tests umpired: 9 (2001–2007)
- ODIs umpired: 66 (2000–2009)
- T20Is umpired: 8 (2005–2007)

Career statistics
Competition	FC	LA
Matches	119	124
Runs scored	3,767	1,083
Batting average	26.90	15.25
100s/50s	5/13	0/3
Top score	115*	64*
Balls bowled	22,567	5,997
Wickets	243	87
Bowling average	35.74	42.57
5 wickets in innings	5	0
10 wickets in match	0	0
Best bowling	6/38	3/23
Catches/stumpings	69/–	31/–
- Source: ESPNcricinfo, 9 September 2007

Ian Lester Howell (born 20 May 1958) is a South African cricket umpire and former first-class cricketer. As a cricketer, he played first-class cricket for Border and Eastern Province in South Africa. A left-hand batsman and a left-arm medium bowler, Howell played 119 first-class games, scoring 3,767 runs with 5 hundreds and 13 fifties at a batting average of 26.90. His top score was 115 not out. He took 243 first-class wickets with 5 five-wicket hauls at a bowling average of 35.74. HIs best bowling figures were 6/38.

== Umpiring career ==
Howell has been a member of the International Cricket Council's panel of International Umpires since 2002. He is eligible to officiate in ODIs in South Africa as the home umpire, and as the TV umpire in Test matches. In December 2006 he replaced Mark Benson on-field during a Test match in Centurion when Benson was taken to hospital with heart palpitations, making him the first person to umpire in a Test match in his native country since the introduction of the Elite Panel of umpires in 2002. Howell is also regularly appointed by the ICC to stand in Test matches and ODI's away from South Africa to support the ICC Elite umpire panel at busy times in the cricket calendar. Howell was also appointed to the group stage of the 2007 Cricket World Cup in the West Indies, and officiated in the inaugural Twenty20 World Championship which took place in his native South Africa.

== See also ==
- List of Test cricket umpires
- List of One Day International cricket umpires
- List of Twenty20 International cricket umpires
