= Karl Hurter =

South African cricket umpire (born 1964)

Personal information
- Born: 12 February 1964 (age 62); Port Elizabeth, South Africa
- Role: Umpire

Umpiring information
- ODIs umpired: 4 (2002–2006)
- T20Is umpired: 1 (2006)
- WODIs umpired: 1 (2004)
- Source: Cricinfo, 19 May 2014

Karl Hurter (born 12 February 1964) is a South African former cricket umpire.

Hurter umpired in five international games. He made his One Day International (ODI) umpiring debut on 27 March 2002, when the visiting Australia played South Africa. Hurter stood in four ODIs between 2002 and 2006 and officiated in his only Twenty20 International in 2006.

== See also ==
- List of One Day International cricket umpires
- List of Twenty20 International cricket umpires
