= International cricket in 2002 =

Cricket season

The 2002 international cricket season was from April to September 2002.

== Season overview ==
International tours
Start date	Home team	Away team	Results [Matches]	
Start date	Home team	Away team	Test	ODI
11 April 2002	West Indies	India	2-1 [5]	1-2 [5]
21 April 2002	Pakistan	New Zealand	1-0 [2]	3-0 [3]
16 May 2002	England	Sri Lanka	2-0 [3]	—
5 June 2002	West Indies	New Zealand	0-1 [2]	3-1 [5]
12 June 2002	Australia	Pakistan	—	1-2 [3]
21 July 2002	Sri Lanka	Bangladesh	2-0 [2]	3-0 [3]
25 July 2002	England	India	1-1 [4]	—
International tournaments
Dates	Tournament		Winners	
27 June 2002	(England) NatWest Series 2002		India	
12 August 2002	Morocco Cup 2002		Sri Lanka	
29 August 2002	(Kenya) PSO Tri-Nation Tournament 2002		Australia	

== April ==
=== India in the West Indies ===
Test series
No.	Date	Home captain	Away captain	Venue	Result
Test 1598	11–15 April	Carl Hooper	Sourav Ganguly	Bourda, Georgetown	Match drawn
Test 1599	19–23 April	Carl Hooper	Sourav Ganguly	Queen's Park Oval, Port of Spain	India by 37 runs
Test 1601	2–5 May	Carl Hooper	Sourav Ganguly	Kensington Oval, Bridgetown	West Indies by 10 wickets
Test 1602	10–14 May	Carl Hooper	Sourav Ganguly	Antigua Recreation Ground, St John's	Match drawn
Test 1604	18–22 May	Carl Hooper	Sourav Ganguly	Sabina Park, Kingston	West Indies by 155 runs
ODI series
No.	Date	Home captain	Away captain	Venue	Result
ODI 1835a	25 May	Carl Hooper	Sourav Ganguly	Sabina Park, Kingston	Match abandoned
ODI 1835b	26 May	Carl Hooper	Sourav Ganguly	Sabina Park, Kingston	Match abandoned
ODI 1836	29 May	Carl Hooper	Sourav Ganguly	Kensington Oval, Bridgetown	India by 7 wickets
ODI 1837	1 June	Carl Hooper	Sourav Ganguly	Queen's Park Oval, Port of Spain	West Indies by 7 wickets
ODI 1838	2 June	Carl Hooper	Sourav Ganguly	Queen's Park Oval, Port of Spain	India by 56 runs (D/L)

=== New Zealand in Pakistan ===
ODI series
No.	Date	Home captain	Away captain	Venue	Result
ODI 1833	21 April	Waqar Younis	Stephen Fleming	National Stadium, Karachi	Pakistan by 153 runs
ODI 1834	24 April	Waqar Younis	Stephen Fleming	Rawalpindi Cricket Stadium, Rawalpindi	Pakistan by 3 wickets
ODI 1835	27 April	Waqar Younis	Stephen Fleming	Gaddafi Stadium, Lahore	Pakistan by 66 runs
Test series
No.	Date	Home captain	Away captain	Venue	Result
Test 1600	1–3 May	Waqar Younis	Stephen Fleming	Gaddafi Stadium, Lahore	Pakistan by an innings and 324 runs
Test 1601a	8–12 May	Waqar Younis	Stephen Fleming	National Stadium, Karachi	Match cancelled

As a result of the bombing in Lahore near New Zealand Cricket Team's hotel, the 2nd Test was abandoned and New Zealand immediately returned home.

== May ==
=== Sri Lanka in England ===
Test series
No.	Date	Home captain	Away captain	Venue	Result
Test 1603	16–20 May	Nasser Hussain	Sanath Jayasuriya	Lord's Cricket Ground, London	Match drawn
Test 1605	30 May–2 June	Nasser Hussain	Sanath Jayasuriya	Edgbaston Cricket Ground, Birmingham	England by an innings and 111 runs
Test 1606	13–17 June	Nasser Hussain	Sanath Jayasuriya	Old Trafford Cricket Ground, Manchester	England by 10 wickets

== June ==
=== New Zealand in the West Indies ===
ODI series
No.	Date	Home captain	Away captain	Venue	Result
ODI 1839	5 June	Carl Hooper	Stephen Fleming	Sabina Park, Kingston	No result
ODI 1840	8 June	Carl Hooper	Stephen Fleming	Beausejour Stadium, Gros Islet	West Indies by 6 wickets
ODI 1841	9 June	Carl Hooper	Stephen Fleming	Beausejour Stadium, Gros Islet	West Indies by 7 wickets
ODI 1843	12 June	Carl Hooper	Stephen Fleming	Queen's Park Oval, Port of Spain	New Zealand by 9 wickets (D/L)
ODI 1845	16 June	Carl Hooper	Stephen Fleming	Arnos Vale Ground, Kingstown	West Indies by 4 wickets
Test series
No.	Date	Home captain	Away captain	Venue	Result
Test 1607	21–24 June	Carl Hooper	Stephen Fleming	Kensington Oval, Bridgetown	New Zealand by 204 runs
Test 1608	28 June–2 July	Carl Hooper	Stephen Fleming	National Stadium, St. George's	Match drawn

=== Pakistan in Australia ===
ODI series
No.	Date	Home captain	Away captain	Venue	Result
ODI 1842	11 June	Ricky Ponting	Waqar Younis	Docklands Stadium, Melbourne	Australia by 7 wickets
ODI 1844	15 June	Ricky Ponting	Waqar Younis	Docklands Stadium, Melbourne	Pakistan by 2 wickets
ODI 1846	19 June	Ricky Ponting	Waqar Younis	The Gabba, Brisbane	Pakistan by 91 runs

=== NatWest Tri-Series 2002 ===
Group stage
No.	Date	Team 1	Captain 1	Team 2	Captain 2	Venue	Result
ODI 1847	27 June	England	Nasser Hussain	Sri Lanka	Sanath Jayasuriya	Trent Bridge, Nottingham	England by 44 runs
ODI 1848	29 June	England	Nasser Hussain	India	Saurav Ganguly	Lord's Cricket Ground, London	India by 6 wickets
ODI 1849	30 June	India	Saurav Ganguly	Sri Lanka	Sanath Jayasuriya	Kennington Oval, London	India by 4 wickets
ODI 1850	2 July	England	Nasser Hussain	Sri Lanka	Sanath Jayasuriya	Headingley Cricket Ground, Leeds	England by 3 wickets
ODI 1851	4 July	England	Nasser Hussain	India	Saurav Ganguly	Riverside Ground, Chester-le-Street	No result
ODI 1852	6 July	India	Saurav Ganguly	Sri Lanka	Sanath Jayasuriya	Edgbaston Cricket Ground, Birmingham	India by 4 wickets
ODI 1853	7 July	England	Nasser Hussain	Sri Lanka	Sanath Jayasuriya	Old Trafford Cricket Ground, Manchester	Sri Lanka by 23 runs
ODI 1854	9 July	England	Nasser Hussain	India	Saurav Ganguly	Kennington Oval, London	England by 64 runs
ODI 1855	11 July	India	Saurav Ganguly	Sri Lanka	Sanath Jayasuriya	The Royal & Sun Alliance County Ground, Bristol	India by 63 runs
Final
No.	Date	Team 1	Captain 1	Team 2	Captain 2	Venue	Result
ODI 1856	13 July	England	Nasser Hussain	India	Saurav Ganguly	Lord's Cricket Ground, London	India by 2 wickets

== July ==
=== Bangladesh in Sri Lanka ===
Test series
No.	Date	Home captain	Away captain	Venue	Result
Test 1609	21–23 July	Sanath Jayasuriya	Khaled Mashud	P Saravanamuttu Stadium, Colombo	Sri Lanka by an innings and 196 runs
Test 1611	28–31 July	Sanath Jayasuriya	Khaled Mashud	Sinhalese Sports Club Ground, Colombo	Sri Lanka by 288 runs
ODI series
No.	Date	Home captain	Away captain	Venue	Result
ODI 1857	4 August	Sanath Jayasuriya	Khaled Mashud	Sinhalese Sports Club Ground, Colombo	Sri Lanka by 5 wickets
ODI 1858	5 August	Sanath Jayasuriya	Khaled Mashud	Sinhalese Sports Club Ground, Colombo	Sri Lanka by 8 wickets
ODI 1859	7 August	Sanath Jayasuriya	Khaled Mashud	R Premadasa Stadium, Colombo	Sri Lanka by 58 runs

=== India in England ===
Test series
No.	Date	Home captain	Away captain	Venue	Result
Test 1610	25–29 July	Nasser Hussain	Saurav Ganguly	Lord's Cricket Ground, London	England by 170 runs
Test 1612	8–12 August	Nasser Hussain	Saurav Ganguly	Trent Bridge, Nottingham	Match drawn
Test 1613	22–26 August	Nasser Hussain	Saurav Ganguly	Headingley Cricket Ground, Leeds	India by an innings and 46 runs
Test 1614	5–9 September	Nasser Hussain	Saurav Ganguly	Kennington Oval, London	Match drawn

== August ==
=== Morocco Cup 2002 ===
Team	Pld	W	L	Pts	NRR
Sri Lanka*	4	3	1	13	+0.725
South Africa*	4	2	2	8	−0.725
Pakistan	4	1	3	4	−0.725

Group stage
No.	Date	Team 1	Captain 1	Team 2	Captain 2	Venue	Result
ODI 1860	12 August	Pakistan	Waqar Younis	South Africa	Shaun Pollock	National Cricket Stadium, Tangier	South Africa by 54 runs
ODI 1861	14 August	Pakistan	Waqar Younis	Sri Lanka	Sanath Jayasuriya	National Cricket Stadium, Tangier	Pakistan by 28 runs
ODI 1862	14 August	South Africa	Shaun Pollock	Sri Lanka	Sanath Jayasuriya	National Cricket Stadium, Tangier	Sri Lanka by 93 runs
ODI 1863	17 August	Pakistan	Waqar Younis	Sri Lanka	Sanath Jayasuriya	National Cricket Stadium, Tangier	Sri Lanka by 39 runs
ODI 1864	18 August	Pakistan	Waqar Younis	South Africa	Shaun Pollock	National Cricket Stadium, Tangier	South Africa by 8 runs
ODI 1865	19 August	South Africa	Shaun Pollock	Sri Lanka	Sanath Jayasuriya	National Cricket Stadium, Tangier	Sri Lanka by 6 wickets
Final
No.	Date	Team 1	Captain 1	Team 2	Captain 2	Venue	Result
ODI 1866	21 August	Pakistan	Waqar Younis	Sri Lanka	Sanath Jayasuriya	National Cricket Stadium, Tangier	Sri Lanka by 27 runs

=== PSO Tri-Nation Tournament 2002 ===
Place	Team	Played	Won	Lost	Points	NetRR
1	Australia	4	4	0	19	+2.925
2	Pakistan	4	2	2	10	-1.386
3	Kenya	4	0	4	0	-1.373

Group stage
No.	Date	Team 1	Captain 1	Team 2	Captain 2	Venue	Result
ODI 1867	29 August	Kenya	Steve Tikolo	Pakistan	Waqar Younis	Gymkhana Club Ground, Nairobi	Pakistan by 4 wickets
ODI 1868	30 August	Australia	Ricky Ponting	Pakistan	Waqar Younis	Gymkhana Club Ground, Nairobi	Australia by 224 runs
ODI 1869	1 September	Kenya	Steve Tikolo	Pakistan	Waqar Younis	Gymkhana Club Ground, Nairobi	Pakistan by 7 wickets
ODI 1870	2 September	Kenya	Steve Tikolo	Australia	Ricky Ponting	Gymkhana Club Ground, Nairobi	Australia by 8 wickets
ODI 1871	4 September	Australia	Ricky Ponting	Pakistan	Waqar Younis	Gymkhana Club Ground, Nairobi	Australia by 9 wickets
ODI 1872	5 September	Kenya	Steve Tikolo	Australia	Ricky Ponting	Gymkhana Club Ground, Nairobi	Australia by 5 wickets
Final
No.	Date	Team 1	Captain 1	Team 2	Captain 2	Venue	Result
ODI 1873	7 September	Australia	Ricky Ponting	Pakistan	Waqar Younis	Gymkhana Club Ground, Nairobi	No result
