= 2010 in cricket =

The following is a list of important cricket related events which occurred in the year 2010.

== News ==
=== January ===
- 5 January – During the third Test between South Africa and England, television replays showed Stuart Broad and fellow pace-bowler James Anderson trying to tamper with the ball, causing South Africa to raise concerns about the condition of the ball. Later, the South African team announced that they were not making an official complaint hence the matter was closed officially.
- 6 January – Australia defeated Pakistan in the 3rd Test match at Bellerive Oval winning the 3-test match series 3–0.
- 13 January – Sri Lanka defeated India by 4 wickets in the final of the tri-series also involving Bangladesh.
- 17 January – India's Sachin Tendulkar became the first batsman to complete 13,000 runs in Test cricket, during the opening match against Bangladesh.
- 17 January – South Africa defeated England by an innings and 74 runs in the 4th Test to draw the 4-match series 1–1.
- 19 January – Controversy erupted after the Indian Premier League auction, when none of the franchises put forward a bid for any the eleven Pakistan players who were part of the auction list. The Pakistan Cricket Board later revoked the 'no objection certificate' given to its players to participate in IPL.
- 23 January – Victoria defeated South Australia by 48 runs to win the KFC Twenty20 Big Bash tournament for the 4th time.
- 30 January – Australia defeated Pakistan by 25 runs in the final of the Under19 World Cup, thus becoming the first team to win the tournament thrice.
- 31 January – Pakistan stand-in Captain Shahid Afridi, involved in an alleged ball tampering incident, when he was seen biting the cricket ball on television cameras. Later, he was called by the match referee and subsequently banned from two Twenty20 internationals.

=== February ===
- 3 February – Bangladesh bowled out for 78, the second lowest score in Twenty20 Internationals by a full member of the ICC.
- 5 February – Australia completed the white wash of Pakistan by winning the only Twenty20 International, after defeating them in the ODI series by 5–0.
- 5 February – Australian fast bowler Shaun Tait bowled the quickest ball ever recorded in Australia (160.7 km/h), the third fastest in World cricket after Shoaib Akhtar and Shane Bond.
- 7 February – South African batsman Hashim Amla accomplished the highest Test score (253*) by a South African in India.
- 13 February – Afghanistan qualified in the ICC World Twenty20 for the first time by winning the ICC World Twenty20 Qualifier.
- 14 February – Alviro Petersen made the third highest score (100) by a South African cricketer on Test debut.
- 15 February – Sachin Tendulkar and Virender Sehwag involved in the highest 3rd wicket partnership (249) at the Eden Gardens.
- 16 February – Martin Guptill and Brendon McCullum scored the highest sixth-wicket partnership (339) for New Zealand, missing out on the world record by 12 runs.
- 16 February – Brendon McCullum made the highest score (185) by a New Zealand wicket-keeper in Test cricket.
- 16 February – VVS Laxman completed 1000 Test runs at Eden Gardens.
- 19 February – South African batsman Hashim Amla scored 494 runs in the 2-test match series against India, having been dismissed only once, retaining an average of 494, the second highest batting average ever in a Test series, after Wally Hammond.
- 19 February – India drew the two test match series against South Africa 1–1, by winning the second test match.
- 21 February – South African cricketer Jacques Kallis became the only cricketer in the history of the game to hold more than 10,000 runs and 250 wickets in both one day Internationals and Test cricket.
- 23 February – Australia completed an unbeaten summer, defeating the touring Pakistan and West Indies teams. Since the introduction of ODIs in the 1970s, this was only the second summer after 2000–01, when they did not lose a single match.
- 24 February – India's Sachin Tendulkar became the first cricketer in the history of One Day International cricket to score a double century. He achieved this feet in the second ODI against South Africa. His score of 200* was also the highest ever individual score in an ODI innings beating the previous highest (194) jointly held by Zimbabwe's Charles Coventry and Pakistan's Saeed Anwar. His innings also included a record 25 fours, the highest ever hit in a single ODI innings.
- 28 February – New Zealand's Brendon McCullum became the second-highest scorer in a Twenty20 international when he scored an unbeaten 116 against Australia in the 2nd Twenty20 at Christchurch.
- 28 February – Australia and New Zealand blasted the highest Twenty20 match aggregate [428–10 (40 overs)], in the 2nd match at Christchurch.
- 28 February – West Indian bowlers Darren Sammy and Sulieman Benn took figures of 4 for 6 and 5 for 26 respectively in the only Twenty20 match against Zimbabwe. These are the third and fourth best bowling figures in a Twenty20 to date.

=== March ===
- 3 March – Former fast bowler Waqar Younis appointed as the new coach of the Pakistani cricket team.
- 10 March – The Pakistan Cricket Board bans former skippers, Mohammad Yousuf and Younis Khan for indefinite periods, while Shoaib Malik and Rana Naved-ul-Hasan receive one year bans, following an inquiry into the team's poor performances on the tour of Australia.
- 13 March – Indian cricketer, Yusuf Pathan scores a 100 off 37 balls in an Indian Premier League match. The innings also included a record eleven consecutive hits to the fence.
- 23 March – Shahid Afridi was appointed as the captain of the Pakistani cricket team for the 2010 ICC World Twenty20.
- 24 March – England completed a whitewash of Bangladesh in both the Test and ODI series.
- 29 March – Pakistani cricketer, Shoaib Malik announced his wedding plans to Indian tennis player, Sania Mirza.

=== April ===
- 25 April – Chennai Super Kings won the third season of the Indian Premier League.

== Deaths ==
- 1 January – John Lyon, (Lancashire), 1973–79
- 22 January – Betty Wilson, (Australia women cricket team), 1948–58
- 15 February – Audrey Collins, (England women cricket team), 1937

== See also ==
- International cricket in 2009-10
- International cricket in 2010
- 2007 in cricket
- 2006 in cricket
- 2005 in cricket
