= 2007 in cricket =

The following is a list of important cricket related events which occurred in the year 2007.

== News ==
=== January ===
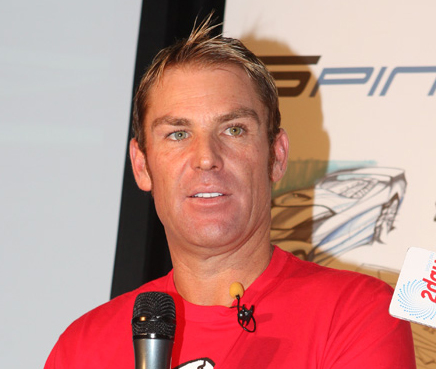
After taking his 1,000th wicket in international cricket, Shane Warne retired from Test cricket in January 2007.

- 3 January – Leg spin bowler Shane Warne picked up his 1,000th international wicket, trapping Monty Panesar leg before wicket (lbw) for a duck.
- 5 January – Australia won the fifth Ashes Test to whitewash England 5–0.
- 6 January – Australian cricketers Shane Warne and Justin Langer retired from international cricket, and fellow Australian Glenn McGrath retired from Test cricket continued to compete in One Day Internationals.
- 6 January – By beating India in the third Test, South Africa won the series 2–1.
- 6 January – Nondescripts Cricket Club defeat Moors Sports Club by six wickets to win the final of the Premier Limited Overs Tournament in Sri Lanka.
- 9 January – Australia broke the world record for the most runs scored in a Twenty20 International match by scoring 221 runs against England.
- 9 January – The Victoria Bushrangers win the final of the 2006–07 KFC Twenty20 Big Bash by ten runs, beating Tasmania.
- 24 January – Kenya win an ODI tri-series against Canada and Scotland, despite losing the final match to Canada.
- 28 January – South Africa win the third Test against Pakistan to win the series 2–1.
- 28 January – South Africa A complete a 3–0 series victory over Zimbabwe A.
- 28 January – South Africa women defeat Pakistan 4–0 in their series, despite a storm ruining the final match.
- 31 January – India win the final ODI against the West Indies to wrap up a 3–1 series victory.

=== February ===
- 9 February – England win the first game in the three match final of the Commonwealth Bank Series.
- 11 February – England beat Australia in the second match of the Commonwealth Bank Series, winning the final 2–0.
- 16 February – Australia lose to New Zealand by a record margin of ten wickets in the first of a three match One Day International series.
- 18 February – Australia lose their first position in the ICC ODI rankings to South Africa.
- 20 February – New Zealand complete a 3-0 whitewash over Australia in the ODI series.
- 28 February – Darren Gough returns to Yorkshire as Captain after three years with Essex.

=== March ===
- 11 March – The 9th Cricket World Cup begins with the opening ceremony in Jamaica.
- 13 March – The first game of the World Cup sees the hosts, the West Indies defeat Pakistan by 54 runs.
- 15 March – In their first World Cup match, Ireland take part in only the third tied game in the history of the tournament when they tie their match with Zimbabwe.
- 16 March – Herschelle Gibbs hits six sixes in a single over playing for South Africa against The Netherlands.
- 17 March – Ireland go one better than their first game, defeating Pakistan by three wickets. On the same day, Bangladesh defeat India, both creating two sensational upsets in ODI history.
- 18 March – Pakistan coach Bob Woolmer is found unconscious in his hotel. He later dies in hospital. England vice-captain Andrew Flintoff is removed from his position and dropped for their game against Canada. Canada score their highest World Cup total, 228-7 after 50 overs, in the game.
- 23 March – Tasmania win their first ever Pura Cup defeating New South Wales in the final in Hobart.
- 23 March – Alexander Downer, the Australian Foreign Minister, states that the Australian Government may be prepared to assist Cricket Australia financially should they be fined by the ICC by deciding not to go ahead with the planned tour of Zimbabwe in September.
- 25 March – Bangladesh defeat Bermuda to knock India out of the World Cup.
- 28 March – Lasith Malinga becomes the first player to take four wickets in consecutive deliveries in an ODI.
- 31 March – Glenn McGrath becomes the leading wicket taker in World Cup history by taking his tally to 57 in Australia's Super 8 victory over Bangladesh.

=== April ===
- 5 April – Greg Chappell resigns as the coach of India following their elimination from the World Cup.
- 6 April – It is announced that the first match to be staged at the Galle International Stadium after the completion of the rebuilding work following the 2004 Tsunami will be the 1st Test Match between Sri Lanka and England in December.
- 7 April – Bangladesh amass their highest ever ODI score of 251–8 in defeating South Africa in the Super 8 stage of the World Cup.
- 13 April – Cricket Kenya announces that they will field a team in the 2007 Logan Cup, to be named "Kenya Select".
- 15 April – Ireland achieve their second win of the World Cup by beating Bangladesh by 74 runs in Barbados. This promotes Ireland to the main table of the ICC ODI Championship.
- 17 April – The final of the 2006 ICC Intercontinental Cup between Ireland and Canada will take place at Grace Road between 22 and 25 May.
- 18 April – The line up for the Semi-Finals of the World Cup is completed when South Africa defeat England. The Semi-finals will feature Australia, New Zealand, Sri Lanka and South Africa.
- 19 April – Duncan Fletcher announces he will step down as the coach of England after their final Super 8 game against the West Indies.
- 20 April – Peter Moores is appointed as the new coach of England. Shoaib Malik becomes the new captain of Pakistan, replacing Inzamam-ul-Haq. Dav Whatmore announces he will step down as coach of Bangladesh following their home series against India in May.
- 21 April – Brian Lara retires from international cricket following the West Indies final Super 8 game against England.
- 24 April – Stephen Fleming steps down as One-Day captain of New Zealand following their World Cup Semi-final defeat against Sri Lanka. Graeme Smith, the captain of South Africa is named as captain of the African XI to take part in the 2007 Afro-Asia Cup. Steve Tikolo, the captain of Kenya, is named as vice-captain. The African squad includes nine South Africans, four Kenyans and two Zimbabweans.
- 25 April – Arthur Milton, the last man to play international cricket and international football for England, dies aged 79 in Bristol.
- 27 April – The ICC announces a change to the format of the ICC Intercontinental Cup for 2007–08. The separate groups have been replaced with a single group of eight teams, all of whom play each other in a round-robin over the two years of the competition.
- 28 April – Australia win their third successive World Cup, beating Sri Lanka in the final in Barbados. Paul-Jan Bakker is appointed coach of The Netherlands.

=== May ===
- 1 May – Ramnaresh Sarwan is appointed as captain of the West Indies in succession to Brian Lara.
- 2 May – Mike Brearley is appointed as the new President of the MCC, with his one-year term due to start on 1 October.
- 10 May – Graeme Smith pulls out of the Afro-Asia Cup in order to undergo foot surgery. Justin Kemp is called in as his replacement as captain. Herschelle Gibbs, Andrew Hall, Jacques Kallis and Makhaya Ntini also withdrew from the ODI squad. Albie Morkel, Morné Morkel and Boeta Dippenaar are called up as replacements.
- 22 May – Sri Lanka win the final match of the Abu Dhabi Series, but lose the series 2–1 to Pakistan.
- 23 May – Ireland defeat Canada in the final of the 2006 ICC Intercontinental Cup, with opener Jeremy Bray scoring 146 on the way to an innings and 115 run win.
- 28 May – Sachin Tendulkar, Shoaib Akhtar, Chaminda Vaas and Lasith Malinga all opt out of the Asian XI ODI squad for the Afro-Asia Cup. Sourav Ganguly, Dilhara Fernando, Mashrafe Mortaza and Zaheer Khan are named as replacements. England complete an innings and 283 run victory over the West Indies with a day to spare, the heaviest defeat suffered by the West Indies in Test history.
- 29 May – India complete a 1-0 Test series win over Bangladesh. Newly appointed West Indies captain Ramnaresh Sarwan is ruled out of the remainder of their tour of England following a shoulder injury inflicted during the second Test at Headlingley. Daren Ganga replaces him on a temporary basis.

=== June ===
- 2 June – Uganda win the 2007 ICC World Cricket League Division Three, beating surprise finalists Argentina by 91 runs.
- 7 June – Cricket South Africa president Ray Mali is named as acting president of the ICC following the death of Percy Sonn, to serve until the ICC's annual conference in 2008.
- 9 June – The Asian XI secure the Afro-Asia Cup following their win in the 2nd ODI at Chennai.
- 10 June – Mahendra Singh Dhoni's unbeaten 139 helps the Asian XI to a 13 run win over the African XI, to complete a 3-0 whitewash.
- 13 June – The Semi-Final places of the Friends Provident Trophy are decided, with the Durham Dynamos and Hampshire Hawks topping the North and South Conferences respectively. For doing so, they earned home ties against runners up Warwickshire Bears (to play against Hampshire) and Essex Eagles (to play against Durham) to be played on 20 June.

== International cricket results ==
=== Test match series ===
Series	Dates	Tests	Home	Away	Drawn	Result	Ref
England in Australia (The Ashes)	November 2006 – January 2007	5	5	0	0	Australia win 5–0	
India in South Africa	December 2006 – January 2007	3	2	1	0	South Africa win 2–1	
Pakistan in South Africa	January 2007	3	2	1	0	South Africa win 2–1	
India in Bangladesh	May 2007	2	0	1	1	India win 1–0	
West Indies in England (The Wisden Trophy)	May 2007 – June 2007	4	3	0	1	England win 3–0	
Bangladesh in Sri Lanka	June 2007 – July 2007	3	3	0	0	Sri Lanka win 3–0	
India in England (Pataudi Trophy)	July 2007 – August 2007	3	0	1	2	India win 1–0	
South Africa in Pakistan	October 2007	2	0	1	1	South Africa win 1–0	
New Zealand in South Africa	November 2007	2	2	0	0	South Africa win 2–0	
Sri Lanka in Australia (Warne-Muralitharan Trophy)	November 2007	2	2	0	0	Australia win 2–0	
Pakistan in India	November 2007 – December 2007	3	1	0	2	India win 1–0	
England in Sri Lanka	November 2007 – December 2007	3	1	0	2	Sri Lanka win 1–0	

== Deaths ==
- 9 January – Ken Cranston, 89, English Test cricketer (1947–48).
- 16 March – Manjural Islam Rana, 22 Bangladeshi Test cricketer (2003–05).
- 18 March – Bob Woolmer, 58, English Test cricketer (1975–81), coach of the South African cricket team (1994–1999), Pakistani cricket team (2004–2007).
- 25 April – Arthur Milton, 79, English Test cricketer (1958–59)
- 29 April – Dick Motz, 67, New Zealand Test cricketer (1961–69)
- 30 April – Tom Cartwright, 71, English Test cricketer (1964–65).
- 25 May – Bill Johnston, 85, Australian Test cricketer (1947–55).
- 27 May – Percy Sonn, 57, South African President of the ICC (2006–07).

== See also ==
- International Cricket: International cricket in 2006-07, International cricket in 2007, International cricket in 2007-08
- 2005 in cricket
- 2006 in cricket
- 2010 in cricket
