= List of international cricket centuries by Herschelle Gibbs =

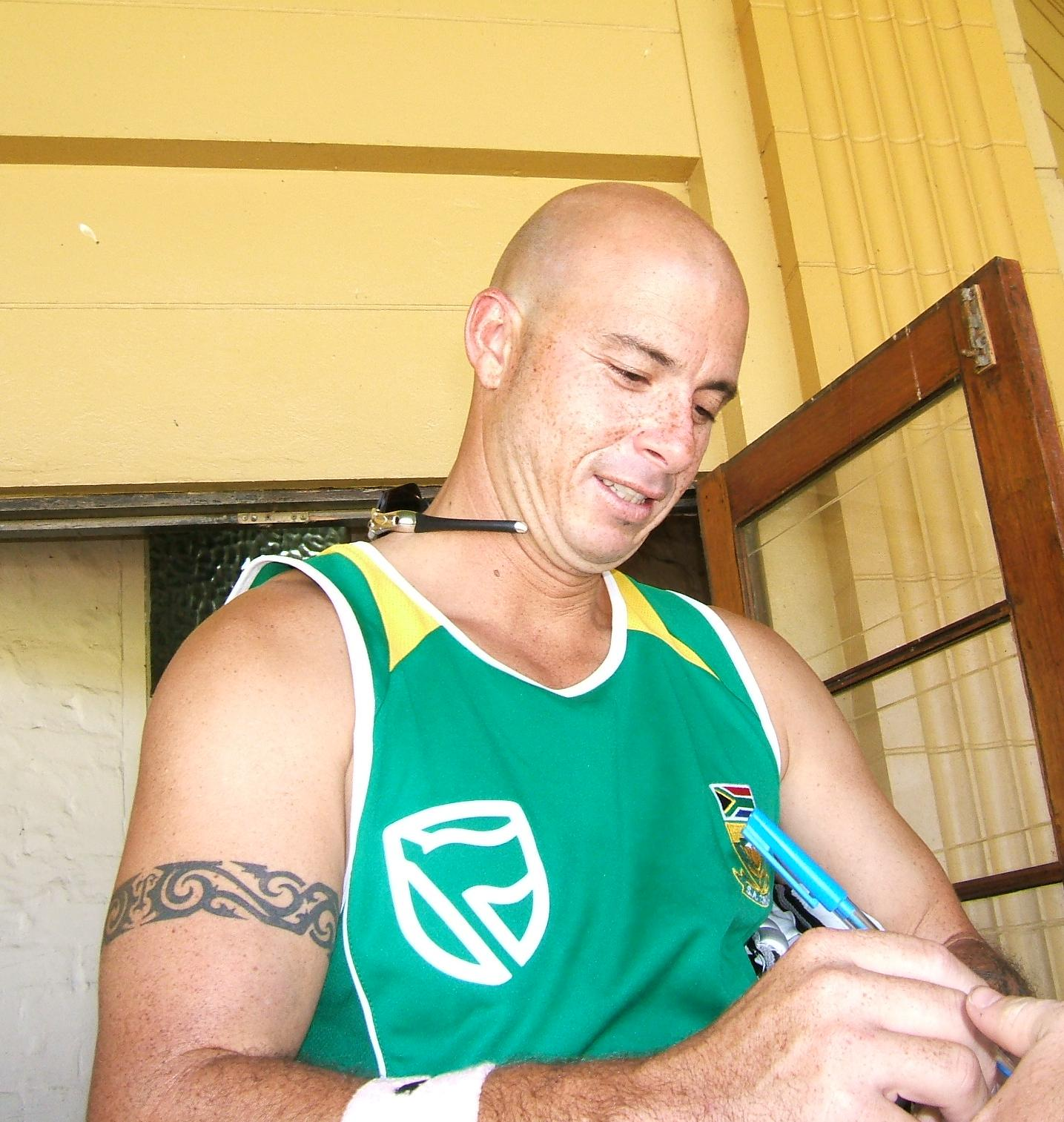
Gibbs in 2009

Herschelle Gibbs is a former South African cricketer who represented his country between 1996 and 2010. He made centuries (100 or more runs in a single innings) on 14 and 21 occasions in Test and One Day International (ODI) matches respectively. With over 14,000 runs, Gibbs is fourth in the list of South Africa's most prolific run-scorers in international cricket. Wisden Cricketers' Almanack included him among its "top 40 cricketers of 2004".

Gibbs made his Test and ODI debuts in 1996 against India and Kenya respectively. However, it was only in 1999 that he made his first century, when he scored 125 against the West Indies, an ODI South Africa won at St George's Park, Port Elizabeth. He followed that with another century against Australia in the 1999 World Cup, although this time in a losing cause. In 2002, Gibbs made three centuries in consecutive innings, equaling a record that was previously held by two other players. (Note: Pakistan cricketers Zaheer Abbas and Saeed Anwar held the record previously. AB de Villiers and Quinton de Kock of South Africa have achieved the feat since Gibbs.) He was denied a fourth successive century when he remained 97 not out against Bangladesh. His career-best score of 175, achieved against Australia, led South Africa to the most successful run-chase in the history of ODIs. Gibbs made a minimum of one century each year from 1999 to 2009. As of October 2015, he is jointly second with Hashim Amla (both with 21 centuries) in the number of ODI centuries among his countrymen, only behind AB de Villiers (22). (Note: Gibbs is joint seventh in the all-time list of leading century-makers in ODIs.) Along with Shikhar Dhawan, Sourav Ganguly, and Chris Gayle, Gibbs holds the record for the most centuries in the ICC Champions Trophy, with three.

Gibbs' first Test century, 211 not out, was made against New Zealand at the AMI Stadium, Christchurch, in March 1999. His highest score of 228 came against Pakistan at the Newlands Cricket Ground, Cape Town in 2003. These two are the only instances of his scoring above 200. In Tests, Gibbs scored centuries against all Test-playing teams except Sri Lanka. In ODIs, Gibbs scored centuries against 10 different teams, including all nine Test-playing teams. On 6 February 2005, he became only the second batsman, after Australia's Ricky Ponting, to score an ODI century against all Test playing nations, when he scored 100 against England. Gibbs also played 23 Twenty20 Internationals (T20I) for South Africa between 2005 and 2010. He did not score any centuries in the format; his best score of 90 not out came against the West Indies.

== Key ==
Symbol	Meaning
*	Remained not out
†	He was named man of the match.
Pos.	Position in the batting order
Inn.	The innings of the match in which he scored his century.
Test	The number of the Test match played in that series (for example, (1/3) denotes the first Test in a three match series).
H/A/N	Whether the venue is home (South Africa), away (opponent's home) or neutral.
Date	The date on which the match began.
Lost	The match was lost by South Africa.
Won	The match was won by South Africa.
Drawn	The match was drawn.
S/R	His strike rate during the innings
(D/L)	The result was determined by the Duckworth–Lewis method.

== Test centuries ==
Test centuries by Herschelle Gibbs
No.	Score	Against	Pos.	Inn.	Test	Venue	H/A/N	Date	Result	Ref
1	211* †	New Zealand	2	2	2/3	AMI Stadium, Christchurch	Away	11 March 1999	Drawn	
2	120	New Zealand	2	2	3/3	Basin Reserve, Wellington	Away	18 March 1999	Won	
3	147	Zimbabwe	1	1	1/2	Harare Sports Club, Harare	Away	7 September 2001	Won	
4	107	India	1	2	1/2	Goodyear Park, Bloemfontein	Home	3 November 2001	Won	
5	196 †	India	1	1	2/2	St George's Park, Port Elizabeth	Home	16 November 2001	Drawn	
6	104 †	Australia	1	4	3/3	Kingsmead Cricket Ground, Durban	Home	15 March 2002	Won	
7	114	Bangladesh	2	2	2/2	Sedgars Park, Potchefstroom	Home	25 October 2002	Won	
8	228 †	Pakistan	2	1	2/2	Newlands Cricket Ground, Cape Town	Home	2 January 2003	Won	
9	179	England	2	1	1/5	Edgbaston Cricket Ground, Birmingham	Away	24 July 2003	Drawn	
10	183	England	2	1	5/5	The Oval, London	Away	4 September 2003	Lost	
11	142	West Indies	2	2	2/4	Kingsmead Cricket Ground, Durban	Home	26 December 2003	Won	
12	142	West Indies	2	3	3/4	Newlands Cricket Ground, Cape Town	Home	2 January 2004	Drawn	
13	192 †	West Indies	2	1	4/4	SuperSport Park, Centurion	Home	16 January 2004	Won	
14	161	England	2	2	4/5	New Wanderers Stadium, Johannesburg	Home	13 January 2005	Lost	

== One Day International centuries ==
One Day International centuries by Herschelle Gibbs
No.	Score	Against	Pos.	Inn.	S/R	Venue	H/A/N	Date	Result	Ref
1	125 †	West Indies	2	1	85.61	St George's Park, Port Elizabeth	Home	30 January 1999	Won	
2	101	Australia	2	1	75.37	Headingley, Leeds	Neutral	13 June 1999	Lost	
3	111	India	2	1	87.40	Jawaharlal Nehru Stadium, Kochi	Away	9 March 2000	Lost	
4	104 †	West Indies	1	2	73.75	Antigua Recreation Ground, St. John's	Away	2 May 2001	Won	
5	107 †	West Indies	2	2	81.06	Kensington Oval, Bridgetown	Away	9 May 2001	Won	
6	125 †	Zimbabwe	2	1	111.60	Queens Sports Club, Bulawayo	Away	23 September 2001	Won	
7	114 †	Pakistan	1	1	87.69	National Cricket Stadium, Tangier	Neutral	12 August 2002	Won	
8	116 †	Kenya	2	1	92.06	R. Premadasa Stadium, Colombo	Neutral	20 September 2002	Won	
9	116*	India	1	2	97.47	R. Premadasa Stadium, Colombo	Neutral	25 September 2002	Lost	
10	153 †	Bangladesh	2	1	116.79	Sedgars Park, Potchefstroom	Home	3 October 2002	Won	
11	108* †	Sri Lanka	1	2	117.39	De Beers Diamond Oval, Kimberley	Home	4 December 2002	Won	
12	143	New Zealand	2	1	101.41	Old Wanderers, Johannesburg	Home	16 February 2003	Lost (D/L)	
13	101	West Indies	2	1	74.81	The Oval, London	Neutral	18 September 2004	Lost	
14	100 †	England	4	1	86.95	Newlands Cricket Ground, Cape Town	Home	6 February 2005	Won	
15	118	England	4	1	88.72	Kingsmead Cricket Ground, Durban	Home	11 February 2005	N/R	
16	175 †	Australia	3	2	157.65	Old Wanderers, Johannesburg	Home	12 March 2006	Won	
17	111 †	Zimbabwe	2	2	111.00	Harare Sports Club, Harare	Away	25 August 2007	Won	
18	102	Pakistan	1	1	79.68	Gaddafi Stadium, Lahore	Away	18 October 2007	Won	
19	119 †	New Zealand	2	2	117.82	Newlands Cricket Ground, Cape Town	Home	2 December 2007	Won	
20	102 †	West Indies	1	2	121.42	The Wanderers Stadium, Johannesburg	Home	3 February 2008	Won	
21	110 †	Australia	2	1	94.82	St George's Park, Port Elizabeth	Home	13 April 2009	Won	
