= Cricket 2007 =

Cricket 2007 may refer to:

- Cricket 07, a 2006 video game published by EA Sports.
- The 2007 Cricket World Cup, the 2007 edition of the Cricket World Cup, held in the West Indies.
- 2007 ICC World Twenty20, the inaugural Twenty20 World Cup
