= National Cricket Stadium =

The National Cricket Stadium can refer to:

- National Cricket Stadium (Grenada)
- National Cricket Stadium, Tangier
- Sher-e-Bangla National Cricket Stadium
