= 2002 Morocco Cup =

Morocco Cup 2002
- Date: 12 – 21 August 2002
- Location: Morocco
- Result: Sri Lanka won the 2002 Morocco Cup
Teams
Pakistan	South Africa	Sri Lanka
Captains
Waqar Younis	Shaun Pollock	Sanath Jayasuriya
Most runs
Mohammad Yousuf (153)	Jacques Kallis (141)	Sanath Jayasuriya (299)
Most wickets
Waqar Younis (11)	Allan Donald (10)	Upul Chandana (8)

The 2002 Morocco Cup was a three-team cricket tournament which took place in Tangier, Morocco during August 2002. The tournament was the first occasion on which the highest level of international cricket had been played in North Africa. Pakistan, South Africa and Sri Lanka competed in the competition, which was funded by Abdul Rahman Bukhatir, a wealthy business man from the United Arab Emirates. Sri Lanka beat South Africa in the final to scoop the $250,000 prize money.

The tournament, in addition to attracting TV audiences to Bukhatir's TEN Sports channel, promoted cricket in North Africa. All of the matches were played at the National Cricket Stadium in Tangier, a purpose built ground which cost $4 million, most of which was spent on the grandstand. The organisers of the competition were so keen to avoid any accusations of match-fixing that they installed closed-circuit television (CCTV) cameras in the team dressing rooms.

During the group stage, Pakistan won only once; beating Sri Lanka in the second match of the tournament. Sri Lanka beat Pakistan in their other match, and defeated South Africa in both the side's group contests to finish top of the table. South Africa won both their matches against Pakistan to qualify for the final. In the final, Sri Lanka beat South Africa by 27 runs, led by a run-a-ball score of 71 from their captain Sanath Jayasuriya, and two wickets from each of Chaminda Vaas, Pulasthi Gunaratne and Muttiah Muralitharan.

Jayasuriya finished the tournament as the leading run-scorer, aggregating 299 runs from his five appearances at an average of 59.80. Each of the top-three run-scorers were Sri Lankan; the highest Pakistani batsman was Mohammad Yousuf whose 153 runs placed him fourth, while South African Jacques Kallis was fifth with 141 runs. In contrast, Waqar Younis of Pakistan took the most wickets, 11, followed by a pair of South Africans – Allan Donald and Lance Klusener, who took 10 and 9 respectively. Upul Chandana and Pulasthi Gunaratne were the leading Sri Lankans, claiming 8 wickets apiece.

== Group stage ==
=== Table ===
Key: Pld = Played, W = Wins, L = Losses, Pts = Points, NRR = Net run rate.

Morocco Cup
Team	Pld	W	L	Pts	NRR
Sri Lanka*	4	3	1	13	+0.725
South Africa*	4	2	2	8	−0.344
Pakistan	4	1	3	4	−0.365

Notes:
Teams marked * progressed to the final of the competition.

== Fixtures ==
=== 1st match ===
12 August 2002

South Africa; 283/9 (50 overs)	v	Pakistan; 229 (43.2 overs)
HH Gibbs 114 (130); Waqar Younis 5/38 (10 overs)		Imran Nazir 40 (29); Younis Khan 40 (41); L Klusener 3/45 (8.2 overs)

South Africa won by 54 runs
National Cricket Stadium, Tangier
Umpires: DJ Harper (AUS) and S Venkataraghavan (IND)
Player of the match: HH Gibbs (SA)

- South Africa won the toss and elected to bat.
- Points: Pakistan 0; South Africa 4

=== 2nd match ===
14 August 2002

Pakistan; 279/5 (50 overs)	v	Sri Lanka; 251/8 (50 overs)
Saeed Anwar 70 (77); UDU Chandana 1/29 (5 overs)		MS Atapattu 42 (73); Abdul Razzaq 3/36 (10 overs)

Pakistan won by 28 runs
National Cricket Stadium, Tangier
Umpires: DJ Harper (AUS) and SJA Taufel (AUS)
Player of the match: Younis Khan (PAK)

- Sri Lanka won the toss and elected to field.
- Points: Pakistan 4; Sri Lanka 0

=== 3rd match ===
15 August 2002

Sri Lanka; 267/7 (50 overs)	v	South Africa; 174 (45 overs)
PA de Silva 73* (84); JH Kallis 2/47 (10 overs); AA Donald 2/47 (10 overs)		G Kirsten 55 (65); ST Jayasuriya 3/24 (5 overs)

Sri Lanka won by 93 runs
National Cricket Stadium, Tangier
Umpires: SJA Taufel (AUS) and S Venkataraghavan (IND)
Player of the match: PA de Silva (SL)

- Sri Lanka won the toss and elected to bat.
- Points: South Africa 0; Sri Lanka 5

=== 4th match ===
17 August 2002

Sri Lanka; 242 (49.5 overs)	v	Pakistan; 203 (43.4 overs)
ST Jayasuriya 97 (94); Waqar Younis 3/43 (9 overs)		Mohammad Yousuf 80 (91); PW Gunaratne 4/44 (9.4 overs)

Sri Lanka won by 39 runs
National Cricket Stadium, Tangier
Umpires: DJ Harper (AUS) and S Venkataraghavan (IND)
Player of the match: ST Jayasuriya (SL)

- Sri Lanka won the toss and elected to bat.
- Points: Pakistan 0; Sri Lanka 4

=== 5th match ===
18 August 2002

South Africa; 196/8 (50 overs)	v	Pakistan; 188 (48.3 overs)
MA Boucher 57 (99); Wasim Akram 3/31 (10 overs)		Shahid Afridi 62 (40); AA Donald 4/43 (9.3 overs)

South Africa won by 8 runs
National Cricket Stadium, Tangier
Umpires: DJ Harper (AUS) and SJA Taufel (AUS)
Player of the match: AA Donald (SA)

- South Africa won the toss and elected to bat.
- Points: Pakistan 0; South Africa 4

=== 6th match ===
19 August 2002

South Africa; 220/6 (50 overs)	v	Sri Lanka; 221/4 (42.1 overs)
JH Kallis 84 (124); UDU Chandana 3/32 (10 overs)		PA de Silva 77* (75); R Telemachus 2/51 (6 overs)

Sri Lanka won by 6 wickets
National Cricket Stadium, Tangier
Umpires: SJA Taufel (AUS) and S Venkataraghavan (IND)
Player of the match: PA de Silva (SL)

- South Africa won the toss and elected to bat.
- Points: South Africa 0; Sri Lanka 4

== Final ==
21 August 2002
Scorecard

Sri Lanka; 235/7 (50 overs)	v	South Africa; 208 (48.3 overs)
ST Jayasuriya 71 (71); L Klusener 2/35 (10 overs); AA Donald 2/35 (8 overs)		MV Boucher 70 (65); WPUJC Vaas 2/33 (10 overs); M Muralitharan 2/35 (10 overs)

Sri Lanka won by 27 runs
National Cricket Stadium, Tangier
Umpires: DJ Harper (AUS) and SJA Taufel (AUS)
Player of the match: ST Jayasuriya (SL)

- Sri Lanka won the toss and elected to bat.
