= 2006 in cricket =

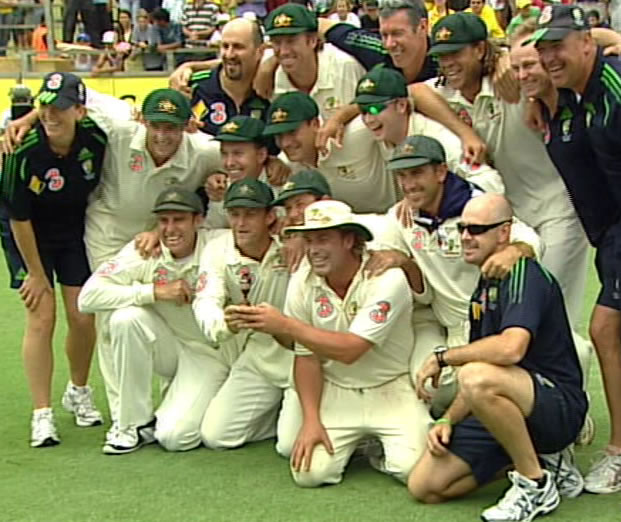
Australia celebrates regaining the Ashes

The following is a list of important cricket related events which occurred in the year 2006.

== Events ==
- 17 January: Virender Sehwag makes 254 off 247 balls, the highest Test score at more than a run a ball, in the first Test between India and Pakistan, which is drawn after a total of seven wickets fall and 1,089 runs are scored.
- 18 January: Zimbabwe Cricket announces that Zimbabwe will not play any Tests in 2006.
- 3 February: Pakistan win the third and final Test against India by 341 runs, their largest victory by runs in Test cricket, thus lengthening their unbeaten streak in Test cricket to seven matches despite Irfan Pathan picking up a hat-trick in the first innings.
- 14 February: With Adam Gilchrist hitting the fastest ODI century for Australia, off 67 balls, Australia win the third and deciding VB Series final against Sri Lanka to win the VB Series for the fourth successive year
- 16 February: Chris Cairns retires from international cricket following New Zealand's bowl-off win in the Twenty20 International with West Indies.
- 19 February: Pakistan U-19 clinch the 2006 Under-19 World Cup after beating India U-19 in the final.
- 3 March: Muttiah Muralitharan becomes the first bowler to take 1,000 international wickets during the first Test between Bangladesh and Sri Lanka at Chittagong. Sri Lanka win the Test by eight wickets.
- 12 March: Records are broken at Johannesburg, as first Australia, then South Africa set world record totals in One Day Internationals. South Africa's total of 438 for 9 sees them win by one wicket, taking the One Day International series 3–2.
- 21 March: West Indies lose their eighth successive Test, by ten wickets to New Zealand, which is their worst Test sequence since the team's admission to Test cricket in 1928.
- 22 March: England beat India by 212 runs in the third and final Test to draw the Test series, their best result in India since 1985.
- 28 March: Queensland complete a victory by an innings and 354 runs over Victoria in the Pura Cup final. Their total of six for 900 declared is the 11th highest in first-class cricket history.
- 31 March: Kevin Pietersen's 71 in the second ODI against India in his 21st ODI innings sees him equal Viv Richards' record of fewest innings to reach 1,000 runs. England lose the match by four wickets, however.
- 11 April: Bottom-ranked Bangladesh bowl top-ranked Australia out for 269 in the first innings of the first Test, taking a first-innings lead of 158. However, Australia come back to win the Test by three wickets.
- 12 April: Following a tour of New Zealand with only one win and one draw from nine international matches, Shivnarine Chanderpaul resigns as captain of West Indies.
- 15 April: Stephen Fleming becomes the first New Zealander to play 100 Tests when taking to the pitch at SuperSport Park to face South Africa. However, the occasion is not a happy one for Fleming, who loses the Test by 128 runs.
- 19 April: Nightwatchman Jason Gillespie bats through nine and a half hours to make 201 not out in the second Test against Bangladesh, the highest score by a nightwatchman, and Australia win the second Test by an innings and 80 runs.
- 26 April: Brian Lara is appointed for his third stint as West Indies captain.
- 30 April: The International Cricket Council award the 2011 Cricket World Cup to Asia and the 2015 Cricket World Cup to Australia and New Zealand.
- 6 May: On the second day of the final Test between South Africa and New Zealand, Jacques Kallis scores his 8000th Test run to join Garry Sobers in the club of players with 8000 runs and 200 wickets. The following day, South Africa go on to win the Test by four wickets.
- 17 May: Bermuda become the 23rd team to play official One Day Internationals, beating Canada by three wickets in their first match.
- 5 June: Mahela Jayawardene captains Sri Lanka to a 134-run win over England, their second Test win in England and the first since 1998.
- 13 June: Ireland are the 24th nation to play ODI cricket, losing by 38 runs to England in Belfast.
- 1 July: Sanath Jayasuriya and Upul Tharanga put on 286 for the first wicket in the final One-day International between Sri Lanka and England, the third-highest ODI partnership in history. Sri Lanka go on to chase England's total of 321 for seven in 37.3 of the 50 overs, completing a 5–0 whitewash.
- 4 July: After the first three Tests of the series have ended in draws, India win the final Test of their series in the West Indies by 49 runs to complete their first series win in the West Indies since 1970–71.
- 4 July: Sri Lanka set a new record for highest ODI total, piling on 443 for four against Netherlands at Amstelveen.
- 29 July: Mahela Jayawardene and Kumar Sangakkara set a new world record partnership for any wicket in first-class cricket, making 624 for Sri Lanka in the first Test against South Africa. Jayawardene goes on to make the highest Test score by a Sri Lankan, totalling 374. Sri Lanka win the Test by an innings and 153 runs after declaring on 756 for five.
- 20 August: Pakistan become the first team to forfeit a Test match, after a protest concerning umpire Darrell Hair's adjudication that Pakistan had illegally altered the condition of the ball. The deliberations lasted several hours before the match was declared a forfeit, giving England a 3–0 win in the Test series.
- 21 December – Australian spin bowler Shane Warne announces his retirement from International and Domestic Cricket at a press conference at the MCG.

== Test match series ==
- South Africa in Australia (3 Tests, December 2005-January) – Australia win series 2–0.
- India in Pakistan (3 Tests, January–February) – Pakistan win series 1–0.
- Sri Lanka in Bangladesh (2 Tests, February–March) – Sri Lanka win series 2–0.
- England in India (3 Tests, March) – Series tied 1–1.
- West Indies in New Zealand (3 Tests, March) – New Zealand win series 2–0.
- Australia in South Africa (3 Tests, March–April) – Australia win series 3–0.
- Pakistan in Sri Lanka (2 Tests, March–April) – Pakistan win series 1–0.
- Australia in Bangladesh (2 Tests, April) – Australia win series 2–0.
- New Zealand in South Africa (3 Tests, April–May) – South Africa win series 2–0.
- Sri Lanka in England (3 Tests, May–June) – Series tied 1–1.
- India in West Indies (4 Tests, June–July) – India win series 1–0.
- Pakistan in England (4 Tests, July–August) – England win series 3–0.
- West Indies in Pakistan (3 Tests, November–December) – Pakistan win series 2–0.
- England in Australia (5 Tests, November–January 2007) – Australia win series 5–0.
- Sri Lanka in New Zealand (2 Tests, December 2007) – Series tied 1–1.
- India in South Africa (3 Tests, December–January 2007) – South Africa win series 2–1.

== Deaths ==
- 19 January: Geoff Rabone, 84 New Zealand cricketer
- 22 January: Alec Coxon, 90, Yorkshire and England seam bowler
- 7 February: Shujauddin, 75, Pakistan spin bowler
- 9 March: Dennis Brookes, 90, Northamptonshire and England batsman
- 27 March: Neil Williams, 43, St Vincent-born England bowler
- 24 May: Eric Bedser, 87, Surrey all-rounder and county president
- 1 July: Fred Trueman, 85, England and Yorkshire fast bowler, first bowler to take 300 Test wickets
- 1 July: Michael Barton, 91, Surrey batsman, captain, and president

== See also ==
- 2006 English cricket season
- 2005–06 Australian cricket season, 2005–06 West Indian cricket season
- International cricket: 2005–06, 2006, 2006–07
- 2005 in cricket
- 2007 in cricket
- 2006 in sports
