= 2004 in cricket =

The following is a list of important cricket related events which occurred in the year 2004.

== Events ==
- 15 February – 5 March – 2004 U-19 Cricket World Cup in Dhaka, Bangladesh – Pakistan beat West Indies by 25 runs.
- 12 March – Shane Warne becomes the first spinner in history to take 500 Test wickets.
- 13 March – India beat Pakistan in the highest scoring One Day International ever (693 runs), in the opening match of their first Pakistan tour since 1989.
- 14 March – West Indies collapse to their lowest ever total of 47 all out in the first Test against England in Jamaica. South Africa's Jacques Kallis becomes the second player in history to score a century in five successive Tests in Hamilton, New Zealand.
- 29 March – Virender Sehwag sets a new Indian Test record innings with 309 in the historic first Test against Pakistan.
- April – Ricky Ponting is named Leading Cricketer in the World by Wisden Cricketers' Almanack.
- 2 April – Zimbabwe Cricket Union announces the retirement of Heath Streak as captain of Zimbabwe. It is later revealed he was sacked, and 15 senior players withdraw from Zimbabwean cricket, citing political interference by Robert Mugabe's government in team selection.
- 12 April – The West Indies' Brian Lara regains the individual Test innings record from Australian Matthew Hayden with 400 not out in the fourth Test against England in St. John's, Antigua.
- 30 April – University of Western Australia biomechanical study concludes Muttiah Muralitharan's doosra violates guidelines on allowable straightening of arm. Any further reports of him bowling it may result in a one-year ban from cricket.
- 8 May – Sri Lanka's Muttiah Muralitharan breaks Courtney Walsh's world record of 519 Test wickets with his 520th wicket against Zimbabwe in Harare.
- 10 June – Zimbabwe Cricket Union agrees to abandon any further Test matches in 2004, under pressure from International Cricket Council over substandard teams due to 15 striking players.
- 19 June – 4 September – Inaugural Pro Cricket season, the first professional cricket tournament in the United States.
- 13 July – Shane Warne equals Muttiah Muralitharan's world record of 527 Test wickets, against Sri Lanka in Cairns.
- 15 July – 1 August – Asia Cup in Sri Lanka – Sri Lanka beat India by 25 runs.
- 6 August – The first women's Twenty20 International match was held between England and New Zealand.
- 7 August – Leicestershire claim the second Twenty20 Cup, handing Surrey their first ever defeat in the competition in the final.
- 28 August – Gloucestershire win the Cheltenham & Gloucester Trophy, beating Worcestershire by 8 wickets.
- 1 September – Steve Harmison becomes only the second England play to get a hat-trick of wickets in a One Day International.
- 7 September – The International Cricket Council awards ceremony is held. Rahul Dravid of India is named Test player of the year and cricketer of the year. England's Andrew Flintoff is named one-day player of the year. Australian Simon Taufel won the umpire of the year award.
- 10–25 September – ICC Champions Trophy in England West Indies won the final beating England by 2 wickets.
- 6 October – Anil Kumble takes three wickets in the first Test against Australia, taking his total in Test matches to 400. He becomes the ninth player to reach this milestone in Test history.
- November – England play a series of One Day Internationals in Zimbabwe, despite widespread calls in the United Kingdom for the tour to be called off due to the political situation in Zimbabwe. They win the series 4–0.
- 26 December – Bangladesh defeats India by 15 runs in an ODI. It was their first win on their homeland and against India
- 27 December – New Zealand's One Day International against Sri Lanka scheduled on 29 December is postponed to 11 January 2005.
- 29 December – Australia take a 2–0 lead in their home series against Pakistan.
- 29 December – Sri Lanka abandon their tour of Zimbabwe and return home in response to the tsunami disaster.

== Test Match Series ==
Australia v India (4 Tests, Dec 2003 – January) Series tied 1-1, 2 matches drawn.
South Africa v West Indies (4 Tests, Dec 2003-January) South Africa win series 3-0, 1 match drawn
Zimbabwe v Bangladesh (2 Tests, February–March) – Zimbabwe win series 1-0, 1 match drawn
New Zealand v South Africa (3 Tests, March) – series drawn 1-1, 1 match drawn.
Sri Lanka v Australia (3 Tests, March) – Australia win series 3-0
Pakistan v India (3 Tests, March–April) – India win series 2-1.
Zimbabwe v Sri Lanka (2 Tests, May) – Sri Lanka win series 2-0
England v New Zealand (3 Tests, May–June) – England win series 3-0.
West Indies v Bangladesh (2 Tests, June) – West Indies win series 1-0, 1 match drawn.
Australia v Sri Lanka (2 Tests, July) – Australia win series 1-0, 1 match drawn
England v West Indies (4 Tests, July–August) – England win series 4-0.
Sri Lanka v South Africa (2 Tests, August) – Sri Lanka win series 1-0, 1 match drawn.
Sri Lanka v Pakistan (2 Tests, October) – Series tied, 1-1
India v Australia (4 Tests, October–November) – Australia win the series 2-1, 1 match drawn.
Bangladesh v New Zealand (2 Tests, October–November) – New Zealand win 2-0
Australia v New Zealand (2 Tests, November) – Australia won 2-0
India v South Africa – (2 Tests, November–December) – India won 1-0, one match drawn.
Bangladesh v India (2 Tests, December) – India win 2-0
South Africa v England – (5 Tests, December–January 2005) – England 1-0 up after 2 Tests at year end.
Australia v Pakistan (3 Tests, December- January 2005) – Australia 2-0 up after 2 Tests at year end.

== Deaths ==
- 19 January – David Hookes, 48, Australian cricketer and Victorian coach
- 27 April – Willie Watson, Yorkshire, Leicestershire and England
- 5 March – Jack Flavell, Worcestershire and England fast bowler
- 11 October – Keith Miller, 84, Australian all-rounder and World War II fighter pilot.
- 18 December – Vijay Hazare, 89, Indian all rounder

== See also ==
- 2004 in sports
