= 2005 in cricket =

The following is a list of important cricket related events which occurred in the year 2005.

== Events ==
- 2 January – Pakistani Salman Butt scores his first Test century in a match against Australia.
- 10 January – First World Cricket Tsunami Appeal match between Asian XI and ICC World XI is played. It is the first time a team representing more than one of the ICC member nations plays an ODI.
- 10 January – Bangladesh record their first Test victory, over Zimbabwe in Chittagong.
- 14 January – Kenya's cricket association is dissolved by the government following allegations that it was misusing its funds.
- 17 February – Australia (214 for 5) defeat New Zealand (170) by 44 runs in the first ever international Twenty20 cricket match.
- 17 February – Kenya's Sports Ministry announces the formation of Cricket Kenya, a new governing body for the sport in the country.
- 6 March – Seven players, including Brian Lara, are dropped from the West Indies team over a sponsorship row.
- 24 March – Sri Lanka's Sports minister Jeevan Kumaratunga dissolves Sri Lanka Cricket (SLC) and appoints a six-member interim board headed by Jayantha Dharmadasa to run cricket in the country.
- 20 May – The BCCI appoint Greg Chappell as India's new coach.
- 25 May – Tom Moody is employed as coach for Sri Lanka.
- 18 June – In the 2005 NatWest Series in England, world number ten Bangladesh defeats the three-time world champions and world number one Australia by five wickets at Sophia Gardens, Cardiff. Mohammad Ashraful scored a run-a-ball 100, only the second century in Bangladeshi history, securing him the Man of the Match award.
- 2 July – England come back from 33 for 5 to make 196 in the final of the NatWest Series, thus tying their match with Australia.
- 13 July – Scotland win the 2005 ICC Trophy, beating Ireland in the final by 47 runs. Both teams qualify for the 2007 World Cup along with Bermuda, Canada and the Netherlands.
- 13 July – West Indies begin their tour of Sri Lanka without ten first-team regulars due to a contract dispute, with only captain Shivnarine Chanderpaul remaining true to the side.
- 21 July – Glenn McGrath pass 500 wickets with 5–21 on the first day of the Ashes 2005, as Australia recover from being bowled out for 190 to set the English back to 92 for 7.
- 7 August – England complete the second-narrowest victory by runs in Test cricket, beating Australia by two runs to square the series at 1–1.
- 11 August – Shane Warne has Marcus Trescothick caught behind to pass 600 Test wickets, the first bowler to do so.
- 27 August – England women beat Australia women in the second Test to win the series 1–0, and regain the Women's Ashes for the first time in 42 years.
- 27 August – England bowl Australia out for 218 in the fourth Test at Trent Bridge, and become the first team in seventeen years to ask Australia to follow on. England go on to win the Test match and ensure at least a drawn series.
- 12 September – England regain The Ashes with a 2–1 series victory over Australia. Andrew Flintoff wins the Compton-Miller medal as Man of the Series, Australia's Shane Warne finishes the series with 40 wickets.
- 17 September – Nottinghamshire clinch the 2005 County Championship title with a 214-run win over Kent.
- 17 September – Faisalabad Wolves beat Chilaw Marians by five wickets to become the inaugural winners of the International 20:20 Club Championship.
- 22 September – Indian fast bowler Irfan Pathan completes a 21-wicket haul for the two-Test series against Zimbabwe, equalling the record for wickets taken in two-Test series. The win is India's first Test series victory in Zimbabwe.
- 5 October – the ICC World XI make their international debut against Australia in the first of three ODIs in the ICC Super Series. Australia win by 93 runs.
- 9 October – Australia complete a 3–0 series win in the Super Series ODIs, not losing a single match by fewer than 50 runs.
- 13 October – India name Rahul Dravid as captain for the two home ODI series with Sri Lanka and South Africa, replacing Sourav Ganguly. Ganguly does not play a single game in the series against Sri Lanka, despite being fit.
- 17 October – Australia beat the ICC World XI in the Supertest at the SCG by 210 runs. Stuart MacGill takes nine wickets for Australia, while Matthew Hayden hits 111 and 77.
- 29 October – Ireland beat Kenya by six wickets to win the Intercontinental Cup.
- 31 October – India wicket-keeper Mahendra Singh Dhoni hits 183 not out in India's six-wicket win over Sri Lanka at Jaipur, setting a record for the highest score by a wicket-keeper in ODIs. It is the sixth-highest innings in ODIs, and also the highest innings for a team batting second.
- 26 November – In the third and final Test of the Frank Worrell Trophy series between West Indies and Australia, Brian Lara hits a first-innings 226 to pass Allan Border as the all-time highest Test run scorer.
- 9 December – New Zealand record the highest successful run chase ever in a One Day International as they score 332 for 8 to beat Australia by two wickets in Christchurch. It is their first win in 19 years at Christchurch, after five matches there have been played without a Kiwi victory. However, Australia take the Chappell–Hadlee Trophy after winning the series 2–1.
- 17 December – Shane Warne takes his 86th Test wicket for the year, dismissing Ashwell Prince lbw, and breaks Dennis Lillee's record of most Test wickets in a single year, set in 1981. Warne ends up with ten more wickets in the year, and the new record stands at 96.

== Test match series ==
South Africa v England – (5 Tests, December–January) – England win series 2–1
Australia v Pakistan (3 Tests, December- January) – Australia win series 3–0.
Bangladesh v Zimbabwe (2 Tests, January) – Bangladesh win series 1–0.
South Africa v Zimbabwe (2 Tests, March) – South Africa win series 2–0.
India v Pakistan (3 Tests, March) – Series tied 1–1.
New Zealand v Australia (3 Tests, March) – Australia win series 2–0.
West Indies v South Africa (4 Tests, April–May) – South Africa win series 2–0.
West Indies v Pakistan (2 Tests, May–June) – Series tied 1–1.
England v Bangladesh (2 Tests, May–June) – England win series 2–0.
Sri Lanka v West Indies (2 Tests, July) – Sri Lanka win series 2–0.
Zimbabwe v New Zealand (2 Tests, August) – New Zealand win series 2–0.
England v Australia (5 Tests, July–September) – England win series 2–1.
Sri Lanka v Bangladesh (2 Tests, September) – Sri Lanka win series 2–0.
Zimbabwe v India (2 Tests, September) – India win 2–0.
Australia v ICC World XI (1 Test, October) – Australia win Supertest 1–0.
Australia v West Indies (3 Tests, November) – Australia win series 3–0.
Pakistan v England (3 Tests, November–December) – Pakistan win series 2–0.
India v Sri Lanka (3 Tests, December) – India win series 2–0.
Australia v South Africa (3 Tests, December–January 2006) – Australia 1–0 up after 2 Tests at year's end.

== Deaths ==
- 7 January – The famous Lime tree at Canterbury's St Lawrence Ground.
- 27 February – Allan Rae, 82, Jamaica and West Indies
- 1 March – Brian Luckhurst, Kent County Cricket Club and England
- 5 March – David Sheppard, 75, Sussex County Cricket Club and England
- 25 March – Ken Suttle, Sussex County Cricket Club, who played a record played 423 consecutive County Championship matches
- 30 May – Fazal Mahmood, 78, Pakistan medium-pace bowler, Wisden Cricketer of the Year 1955
- 18 June – Syed Mushtaq Ali, 90, India, the first Indian batsman to score a Test century away from home.
- 26 June – Eknath Solkar, 57, India all-rounder, described by Cricinfo as "one of India's greatest close-in fielders."
- 5 July – Baloo Gupte, 70, India leg spinner, record-holder of Duleep Trophy best bowling figures with nine for 55.
- 30 November – Denis Lindsay, 66, South Africa wicket-keeper.
- 30 December – Eddie Barlow, 65, South African opening batsman

== See also ==
- 2005 English cricket season
- 2005 ICC Intercontinental Cup
- International cricket in 2005
- International cricket in 2005–06
- 2004 in cricket
- 2006 in cricket
- 2005 in sports
