= Stuart Hess =

South African sports journalist

Stuart Hess is the chief cricket correspondent of the Independent newspaper group in South Africa, and the only journalist it sent out for the Proteas' historic visit to Australia in 2008-09.

Hess has covered the 2000 Olympic Games, as well as every Cricket World Cup since 2003.
