= International cricket in 2010 =

The 2010 international cricket season was between May and August 2010. The season included a spot-fixing scandal involving the Pakistan team that resulted in three Pakistani cricketers being banned by the International Cricket Council and given prison sentences.

== Season overview ==
International tours
| Start date | Home team | Away team | Results [Matches] | | |
| Start date | Home team | Away team | Test | ODI | T20I |
|---|---|---|---|---|---|
| 13 April 2010 | West Indies | Canada | — | 1–0 [1] | — |
| 15 April 2010 | West Indies | Ireland | — | 1–0 [1] | — |
| 19 May 2010 | West Indies | South Africa | 0–2 [3] | 0–5 [5] | 0–2 [2] |
| 22 May 2010 | (United States) New Zealand | Sri Lanka | — | — | 1–1 [2] |
| 27 May 2010 | England | Bangladesh | 2–0 [2] | 2–1 [3] | — |
| 12 June 2010 | Zimbabwe | India | — | — | 0–2 [2] |
| 17 June 2010 | Ireland | Australia | — | 0–1 [1] | — |
| 19 June 2010 | Scotland | England | — | 0–1 [1] | — |
| 22 June 2010 | England | Australia | — | 3–2 [5] | — |
| 5 July 2010 | Pakistan | Australia | 1–1 [2] | — | 2–0 [2] |
| 15 July 2010 | Ireland | Bangladesh | — | 1–1 [2] | — |
| 18 July 2010 | Sri Lanka | India | 1–1 [3] | — | — |
| 19 July 2010 | Scotland | Bangladesh | — | 0–0 [1] | — |
| 20 July 2010 | (Scotland) Netherlands | Bangladesh | — | 1–0 [1] | — |
| 29 July 2010 | England | Pakistan | 3–1 [4] | 3–2 [5] | 2–0 [2] |
International tournaments
| Start date | Tournament | | | Winners | |
| 30 April 2010 | (Cricket West Indies) ICC World Twenty20 | | | England | |
| 28 May 2010 | (Zimbabwe) Tri-nation series | | | Sri Lanka | |
| 15 June 2010 | (Sri Lanka) Asia Cup | | | India | |
| 10 August 2010 | (Sri Lanka) Triangular Series | | | Sri Lanka | |
Minor tours
| Start date | Home team | Away team | Results [Matches] | | |
| Start date | Home team | Away team | First-class | | ODI |
| 10 June 2010 | Netherlands | Scotland | 0–1 [1] | | 1–0 [1] |
| 11 August 2010 | Scotland | Afghanistan | 0–1 [1] | | 1–1 [2] |
| 11 August 2010 | Ireland | Netherlands | 1–0 [1] | | 2–0 [2] |
Minor tournaments
| Start date | Tournament | | | Winners | |
| 1 July 2010 | (Netherlands) ICC World Cricket League Division One | | | Ireland | |
| 14 August 2010 | (Italy) ICC World Cricket League Division Four | | | United States | |

== Pre-season rankings ==
ICC Test Championship 4 April 2010
| Rank | Team | Matches | Points | Rating |
|---|---|---|---|---|
| 1 | India | 38 | 4719 | 127 |
| 2 | South Africa | 38 | 4572 | 120 |
| 3 | Australia | 42 | 4979 | 119 |
| 4 | Sri Lanka | 31 | 3574 | 115 |
| 5 | England | 47 | 5063 | 108 |
| 6 | Pakistan | 25 | 2008 | 80 |
| 7 | New Zealand | 32 | 2541 | 79 |
| 8 | West Indies | 29 | 2224 | 77 |
| 9 | Bangladesh | 25 | 270 | 11 |
Reference: ICC Official Rankings List, 30 August 2009

ICC ODI Championship 4 April 2010
| Rank | Team | Matches | Points | Rating |
|---|---|---|---|---|
| 1 | Australia | 53 | 7051 | 133 |
| 2 | India | 49 | 5982 | 122 |
| 3 | South Africa | 29 | 3401 | 117 |
| 4 | New Zealand | 33 | 3773 | 114 |
| 5 | England | 36 | 3965 | 110 |
| 6 | Sri Lanka | 40 | 4336 | 108 |
| 7 | Pakistan | 33 | 3420 | 104 |
| 8 | West Indies | 30 | 2158 | 72 |
| 9 | Bangladesh | 38 | 1987 | 52 |
| 10 | Zimbabwe | 37 | 1011 | 27 |
| 11 | Ireland | 6 | 152 | 25 |
| 12 | Kenya | 14 | 28 | 2 |
Reference: ICC Official Rankings List, 27 August 2009

== April ==
=== Canada in the West Indies ===
| No. | Date | Home captain | Away captain | Venue | Result |
ODI series
| ODI 2977 | 13 April | Darren Sammy | Ashish Bagai | Sabina Park, Kingston, Jamaica | West Indies by 208 runs |

=== Ireland in the West Indies ===
| No. | Date | Home captain | Away captain | Venue | Result |
ODI series
| ODI 2978 | 15 April | Ramnaresh Sarwan | William Porterfield | Sabina Park, Kingston, Jamaica | West Indies by 6 wickets (D/L) |

=== 2010 ICC World Twenty20 ===
==== Group stage ====
Group A
| Pos | Seed | Team | Pld | W | L | NR | Pts | NRR |
|---|---|---|---|---|---|---|---|---|
| 1 | A2 | Australia (10) | 2 | 2 | 0 | 0 | 4 | 1.525 |
| 2 | A1 | Pakistan (1) | 2 | 1 | 1 | 0 | 2 | −0.325 |
| 3 | | Bangladesh (9) | 2 | 0 | 2 | 0 | 0 | −1.200 |

Source: ESPNCricInfo

Group B
| Pos | Seed | Team | Pld | W | L | NR | Pts | NRR |
|---|---|---|---|---|---|---|---|---|
| 1 | B2 | New Zealand (5) | 2 | 2 | 0 | 0 | 4 | 0.428 |
| 2 | B1 | Sri Lanka (2) | 2 | 1 | 1 | 0 | 2 | 0.355 |
| 3 | | Zimbabwe | 2 | 0 | 2 | 0 | 0 | −1.595 |

Source: ESPNCricInfo

Group C
| Pos | Seed | Team | Pld | W | L | NR | Pts | NRR |
|---|---|---|---|---|---|---|---|---|
| 1 | C2 | India (7) | 2 | 2 | 0 | 0 | 4 | 1.495 |
| 2 | C1 | South Africa (3) | 2 | 1 | 1 | 0 | 2 | 1.125 |
| 3 | | Afghanistan | 2 | 0 | 2 | 0 | 0 | −2.446 |

Source: ESPNCricInfo

Group D
| Pos | Seed | Team | Pld | W | L | NR | Pts | NRR |
|---|---|---|---|---|---|---|---|---|
| 1 | D1 | West Indies (4) | 2 | 2 | 0 | 0 | 4 | 2.780 |
| 2 | D2 | England (6) | 2 | 0 | 1 | 1 | 1 | −0.452 |
| 3 | | Ireland | 2 | 0 | 1 | 1 | 1 | −3.500 |

Source: ESPNCricInfo

- Afghanistan and Ireland qualified via the 2010 ICC World Twenty20 Qualifier.
- Zimbabwe withdrew from the 2009 competition, so failing to achieve a seed or ranking for the 2010 competition.
- Ireland reached the Super Eight stage of the 2009 competition, and if a test nation, would have been ranked 8th; hence an 8th seed is missing from the competition

Group Stage
| No. | Date | Team 1 | Captain 1 | Team 2 | Captain 2 | Venue | Result |
|---|---|---|---|---|---|---|---|
| T20I 151 | 30 April | Sri Lanka | Kumar Sangakkara | New Zealand | Daniel Vettori | Providence Stadium, Providence, Guyana | New Zealand by 2 wickets |
| T20I 152 | 30 April | West Indies | Dwayne Bravo | Ireland | William Porterfield | Providence Stadium, Providence, Guyana | West Indies by 70 runs |
| T20I 153 | 1 May | Afghanistan | Nowroz Mangal | India | Mahendra Singh Dhoni | Beausejour Stadium, Gros Islet, St Lucia | India by 7 wickets |
| T20I 154 | 1 May | Pakistan | Shahid Afridi | Bangladesh | Shakib Al Hasan | Beausejour Stadium, Gros Islet, St Lucia | Pakistan by 21 runs |
| T20I 155 | 2 May | India | Mahendra Singh Dhoni | South Africa | Graeme Smith | Beausejour Stadium, Gros Islet, St Lucia | India by 14 runs |
| T20I 156 | 2 May | Australia | Michael Clarke | Pakistan | Shahid Afridi | Beausejour Stadium, Gros Islet, St Lucia | Australia by 34 runs |
| T20I 157 | 3 May | Sri Lanka | Kumar Sangakkara | Zimbabwe | Prosper Utseya | Providence Stadium, Providence, Guyana | Sri Lanka by 14 runs (D/L) |
| T20I 158 | 3 May | England | Paul Collingwood | West Indies | Chris Gayle | Providence Stadium, Providence, Guyana | West Indies by 8 wickets (D/L) |
| T20I 159 | 4 May | Zimbabwe | Prosper Utseya | New Zealand | Daniel Vettori | Providence Stadium, Providence, Guyana | New Zealand by 7 runs (D/L) |
| T20I 160 | 4 May | England | Paul Collingwood | Ireland | William Porterfield | Providence Stadium, Providence, Guyana | No result |
| T20I 161 | 5 May | Australia | Michael Clarke | Bangladesh | Shakib Al Hasan | Kensington Oval, Bridgetown, Barbados | Australia by 27 runs |
| T20I 162 | 5 May | South Africa | Graeme Smith | Afghanistan | Nowroz Mangal | Kensington Oval, Bridgetown, Barbados | South Africa by 59 runs |

==== Super Eights ====
Group E
| Pos | Team | Pld | W | L | NR | Pts | NRR |
|---|---|---|---|---|---|---|---|
| 1 | England (D2) | 3 | 3 | 0 | 0 | 6 | 0.962 |
| 2 | Pakistan (A1) | 3 | 1 | 2 | 0 | 2 | 0.041 |
| 3 | New Zealand (B2) | 3 | 1 | 2 | 0 | 2 | −0.373 |
| 4 | South Africa (C1) | 3 | 1 | 2 | 0 | 2 | −0.617 |

Source: ESPNCricInfo

Group F
| Pos | Team | Pld | W | L | NR | Pts | NRR |
|---|---|---|---|---|---|---|---|
| 1 | Australia (A2) | 3 | 3 | 0 | 0 | 6 | 2.733 |
| 2 | Sri Lanka (B1) | 3 | 2 | 1 | 0 | 4 | −0.333 |
| 3 | West Indies (D1) | 3 | 1 | 2 | 0 | 2 | −1.281 |
| 4 | India (C2) | 3 | 0 | 3 | 0 | 0 | −1.117 |

Source: ESPNCricInfo

Super Eights
| No. | Date | Team 1 | Captain 1 | Team 2 | Captain 2 | Venue | Result |
|---|---|---|---|---|---|---|---|
| T20I 163 | 6 May | Pakistan | Shahid Afridi | England | Paul Collingwood | Kensington Oval, Bridgetown, Barbados | England by 6 wickets |
| T20I 164 | 6 May | South Africa | Graeme Smith | New Zealand | Daniel Vettori | Kensington Oval, Bridgetown, Barbados | South Africa by 13 runs |
| T20I 165 | 7 May | Australia | Michael Clarke | India | Mahendra Singh Dhoni | Kensington Oval, Bridgetown, Barbados | Australia by 49 runs |
| T20I 166 | 7 May | Sri Lanka | Kumar Sangakkara | West Indies | Chris Gayle | Kensington Oval, Bridgetown, Barbados | Sri Lanka by 57 runs |
| T20I 167 | 8 May | New Zealand | Daniel Vettori | Pakistan | Shahid Afridi | Kensington Oval, Bridgetown, Barbados | New Zealand by 1 run |
| T20I 168 | 8 May | England | Paul Collingwood | South Africa | Graeme Smith | Kensington Oval, Bridgetown, Barbados | England by 39 runs |
| T20I 169 | 9 May | West Indies | Chris Gayle | India | Mahendra Singh Dhoni | Kensington Oval, Bridgetown, Barbados | West Indies by 14 runs |
| T20I 170 | 9 May | Australia | Michael Clarke | Sri Lanka | Kumar Sangakkara | Kensington Oval, Bridgetown, Barbados | Australia by 81 runs |
| T20I 171 | 10 May | Pakistan | Shahid Afridi | South Africa | Graeme Smith | Beausejour Stadium, Gros Islet, St Lucia | Pakistan by 11 runs |
| T20I 172 | 10 May | New Zealand | Daniel Vettori | England | Paul Collingwood | Beausejour Stadium, Gros Islet, St Lucia | England by 3 wickets |
| T20I 173 | 11 May | India | Mahendra Singh Dhoni | Sri Lanka | Kumar Sangakkara | Beausejour Stadium, Gros Islet, St Lucia | Sri Lanka by 5 wickets |
| T20I 174 | 11 May | West Indies | Chris Gayle | Australia | Michael Clarke | Beausejour Stadium, Gros Islet, St Lucia | Australia by 6 wickets |

==== Knockout stage ====
| No. | Date | Team 1 | Captain 1 | Team 2 | Captain 2 | Venue | Result |
Semifinals
| T20I 175 | 13 May | Sri Lanka | Kumar Sangakkara | England | Paul Collingwood | Beausejour Stadium, Gros Islet, St Lucia | England by 7 wickets |
| T20I 176 | 14 May | Pakistan | Shahid Afridi | Australia | Michael Clarke | Beausejour Stadium, Gros Islet, St Lucia | Australia by 3 wickets |
Final
| T20I 177 | 16 May | Australia | Michael Clarke | England | Paul Collingwood | Kensington Oval, Bridgetown, Barbados | England by 7 wickets |

== May ==
=== South Africa in the West Indies ===
| No. | Date | Home captain | Away captain | Venue | Result |
T20I series
| T20I 178 | 19 May | Chris Gayle | Graeme Smith | Sir Vivian Richards Stadium, North Sound, Antigua | South Africa by 13 runs |
| T20I 179 | 20 May | Chris Gayle | Graeme Smith | Sir Vivian Richards Stadium, North Sound, Antigua | South Africa by 1 run |
ODI series
| ODI 2979 | 22 May | Chris Gayle | Graeme Smith | Sir Vivian Richards Stadium, North Sound, Antigua | South Africa by 66 runs (D/L) |
| ODI 2980 | 24 May | Chris Gayle | Graeme Smith | Sir Vivian Richards Stadium, North Sound, Antigua | South Africa by 17 runs |
| ODI 2982 | 28 May | Chris Gayle | Graeme Smith | Windsor Park, Roseau, Dominica | South Africa by 67 runs |
| ODI 2984 | 30 May | Chris Gayle | Graeme Smith | Windsor Park, Roseau, Dominica | South Africa by 7 wickets |
| ODI 2987 | 3 June | Chris Gayle | Graeme Smith | Queen's Park Oval, Port of Spain, Trinidad | South Africa by 1 wicket |
Test series
| Test 1960 | 10–14 June | Chris Gayle | Graeme Smith | Queen's Park Oval, Port of Spain, Trinidad | South Africa by 163 runs |
| Test 1961 | 18–22 June | Chris Gayle | Graeme Smith | Warner Park, Basseterre, St Kitts | Match drawn |
| Test 1962 | 26–30 June | Chris Gayle | Graeme Smith | Kensington Oval, Bridgetown, Barbados | South Africa by 7 wickets |

=== New Zealand vs Sri Lanka ===
| No. | Date | Home captain | Away captain | Venue | Result |
T20I series
| T20I 180 | 22 May | Daniel Vettori | Kumar Sangakkara | Central Broward Regional Park, Lauderhill, Florida | New Zealand by 28 runs |
| T20I 181 | 23 May | Daniel Vettori | Kumar Sangakkara | Central Broward Regional Park, Lauderhill, Florida | Sri Lanka by 7 wickets |

=== Bangladesh in England ===
| No. | Date | Home captain | Away captain | Venue | Result |
Test series
| Test 1958 | 27–31 May | Andrew Strauss | Shakib Al Hasan | Lord's, London | England by 8 wickets |
| Test 1959 | 4–8 June | Andrew Strauss | Shakib Al Hasan | Old Trafford, Manchester | England by an innings and 80 runs |
ODI series
| ODI 3018 | 8 July | Andrew Strauss | Mashrafe Mortaza | Trent Bridge, Nottingham | England by 6 wickets |
| ODI 3025 | 10 July | Andrew Strauss | Mashrafe Mortaza | County Ground, Bristol | Bangladesh by 5 runs |
| ODI 3026 | 12 July | Andrew Strauss | Mashrafe Mortaza | Edgbaston, Birmingham | England by 144 runs |

=== Tri-Nation Series in Zimbabwe ===
| Pos | Team | Pld | W | L | T | NR | BP | Pts | NRR |
|---|---|---|---|---|---|---|---|---|---|
| 1 | Zimbabwe | 4 | 3 | 1 | 0 | 0 | 1 | 13 | 0.214 |
| 2 | Sri Lanka | 4 | 2 | 2 | 0 | 0 | 1 | 9 | 0.104 |
| 3 | India | 4 | 1 | 3 | 0 | 0 | 0 | 4 | −0.278 |

ODI series
| No. | Date | Team 1 | Captain 1 | Team 2 | Captain 2 | Venue | Result |
Group stage
| ODI 2981 | 28 May | India | Suresh Raina | Zimbabwe | Elton Chigumbura | Queens Sports Club, Bulawayo | Zimbabwe by 6 wickets |
| ODI 2983 | 30 May | Sri Lanka | Tillakaratne Dilshan | India | Suresh Raina | Queens Sports Club, Bulawayo | India by 7 wickets |
| ODI 2985 | 1 June | Zimbabwe | Elton Chigumbura | Sri Lanka | Tillakaratne Dilshan | Queens Sports Club, Bulawayo | Sri Lanka by 9 wickets |
| ODI 2986 | 3 June | India | Suresh Raina | Zimbabwe | Elton Chigumbura | Harare Sports Club, Harare | Zimbabwe by 7 wickets |
| ODI 2988 | 5 June | India | Suresh Raina | Sri Lanka | Tillakaratne Dilshan | Harare Sports Club, Harare | Sri Lanka by 6 wickets |
| ODI 2989 | 7 June | Sri Lanka | Tillakaratne Dilshan | Zimbabwe | Elton Chigumbura | Harare Sports Club, Harare | Zimbabwe by 8 wickets |
Final
| ODI 2990 | 9 June | Zimbabwe | Elton Chigumbura | Sri Lanka | Tillakaratne Dilshan | Harare Sports Club, Harare | Sri Lanka by 9 wickets |

== June ==
=== India in Zimbabwe ===
| No. | Date | Home captain | Away captain | Venue | Result |
T20I series
| T20I 182 | 12 June | Elton Chigumbura | Suresh Raina | Harare Sports Club, Harare | India by 6 wickets |
| T20I 183 | 13 June | Elton Chigumbura | Suresh Raina | Harare Sports Club, Harare | India by 7 wickets |

=== Scotland in the Netherlands ===
| No. | Date | Home captain | Away captain | Venue | Result |
2009–10 ICC Intercontinental Cup
| First-class | 10–13 June | Peter Borren | Gordon Drummond | Sportpark Het Schootsveld, Deventer | Scotland by 4 wickets |
ODI series
| ODI 2991 | 15 June | Peter Borren | Gordon Drummond | Hazelaarweg, Rotterdam | Netherlands by 6 wickets |

=== Asia Cup ===
| Pos | Team | Pld | W | L | T | NR | BP | Pts | NRR |
|---|---|---|---|---|---|---|---|---|---|
| 1 | Sri Lanka | 3 | 3 | 0 | 0 | 0 | 2 | 14 | 1.424 |
| 2 | India | 3 | 2 | 1 | 0 | 0 | 1 | 9 | 0.275 |
| 3 | Pakistan | 3 | 1 | 2 | 0 | 0 | 1 | 5 | 0.788 |
| 4 | Bangladesh | 3 | 0 | 3 | 0 | 0 | 0 | 0 | −2.627 |

Source: ESPNCricinfo

ODI series
| No. | Date | Team 1 | Captain 1 | Team 2 | Captain 2 | Venue | Result |
Group stage
| ODI 2992 | 15 June | Sri Lanka | Kumar Sangakkara | Pakistan | Shahid Afridi | Rangiri Dambulla International Stadium, Dambulla | Sri Lanka by 16 runs |
| ODI 2993 | 16 June | Bangladesh | Shakib Al Hasan | India | Mahendra Singh Dhoni | Rangiri Dambulla International Stadium, Dambulla | India by 6 wickets |
| ODI 2995 | 18 June | Sri Lanka | Kumar Sangakkara | Bangladesh | Shakib Al Hasan | Rangiri Dambulla International Stadium, Dambulla | Sri Lanka by 126 runs |
| ODI 2996 | 19 June | Pakistan | Shahid Afridi | India | Mahendra Singh Dhoni | Rangiri Dambulla International Stadium, Dambulla | India by 3 wickets |
| ODI 2998 | 21 June | Pakistan | Shahid Afridi | Bangladesh | Shakib Al Hasan | Rangiri Dambulla International Stadium, Dambulla | Pakistan by 139 runs |
| ODI 2999 | 22 June | India | Mahendra Singh Dhoni | Sri Lanka | Kumar Sangakkara | Rangiri Dambulla International Stadium, Dambulla | Sri Lanka by 7 wickets |
Final
| ODI 3001 | 24 June | India | Mahendra Singh Dhoni | Sri Lanka | Kumar Sangakkara | Rangiri Dambulla International Stadium, Dambulla | India by 81 runs |

=== Australia in Ireland ===
| No. | Date | Home captain | Away captain | Venue | Result |
ODI series
| ODI 2994 | 17 June | William Porterfield | Ricky Ponting | Clontarf Cricket Club Ground, Dublin | Australia by 39 runs |

=== England in Scotland ===
| No. | Date | Home captain | Away captain | Venue | Result |
ODI series
| ODI 2997 | 19 June | Gavin Hamilton | Andrew Strauss | The Grange, Raeburn Place, Edinburgh | England by 7 wickets |

=== Australia in England ===
| No. | Date | Home captain | Away captain | Venue | Result |
ODI series
| ODI 3000 | 22 June | Andrew Strauss | Ricky Ponting | The Rose Bowl, Southampton | England by 4 wickets |
| ODI 3002 | 24 June | Andrew Strauss | Ricky Ponting | Sophia Gardens, Cardiff | England by 4 wickets |
| ODI 3003 | 27 June | Andrew Strauss | Ricky Ponting | Old Trafford, Manchester | England by 1 wicket |
| ODI 3004 | 30 June | Andrew Strauss | Ricky Ponting | The Oval, London | Australia by 78 runs |
| ODI 3011 | 3 July | Andrew Strauss | Ricky Ponting | Lord's, London | Australia by 47 runs |

== July ==
=== WCL Division One ===
==== Group stage ====
| Pos | Team | Pld | W | L | T | NR | Pts | NRR | |
|---|---|---|---|---|---|---|---|---|---|
| 1 | Ireland | 5 | 5 | 0 | 0 | 0 | 10 | 0.918 | Team qualifies for 2013 ICC World Cup Qualifier and final |
| 2 | Scotland | 5 | 4 | 1 | 0 | 0 | 8 | 0.178 | Team qualifies for 2013 ICC World Cup Qualifier and final |
| 3 | Afghanistan | 5 | 3 | 2 | 0 | 0 | 6 | −0.105 | Team qualifies for 2013 ICC World Cup Qualifier and 3rd place playoff |
| 4 | Netherlands | 5 | 2 | 3 | 0 | 0 | 4 | 0.312 | Team qualifies for 2013 ICC World Cup Qualifier and 3rd place playoff |
| 5 | Canada | 5 | 1 | 4 | 0 | 0 | 2 | −0.449 | Team qualifies for 2013 ICC World Cup Qualifier and 5th place playoff |
| 6 | Kenya | 5 | 0 | 5 | 0 | 0 | 0 | −0.915 | Team qualifies for 2013 ICC World Cup Qualifier and 5th place playoff |

Group Stage
| No. | Date | Team 1 | Captain 1 | Team 2 | Captain 2 | Venue | Result |
|---|---|---|---|---|---|---|---|
| ODI 3005 | 1 July | Canada | Ashish Bagai | Afghanistan | Nowroz Mangal | Sportpark Westvliet, Voorburg | Afghanistan by 6 wickets |
| ODI 3006 | 1 July | Kenya | Morris Ouma | Ireland | Trent Johnston | Hazelaarweg, Voorburg | Ireland by 7 wickets |
| ODI 3007 | 1 July | Netherlands | Peter Borren | Scotland | Gordon Drummond | VRA Ground, Amstelveen | Scotland by 1 wicket |
| ODI 3008 | 3–4 July | Ireland | Trent Johnston | Afghanistan | Nowroz Mangal | Hazelaarweg, Rotterdam | Ireland by 39 runs |
| ODI 3009 | 3 July | Scotland | Gordon Drummond | Canada | Ashish Bagai | VRA Ground, Amstelveen | Scotland by 69 runs (D/L) |
| ODI 3010 | 3 July | Netherlands | Peter Borren | Kenya | Morris Ouma | Sportpark Westvliet, Voorburg | Netherlands by 117 runs |
| ODI 3012 | 5 July | Kenya | Morris Ouma | Afghanistan | Nowroz Mangal | VRA Ground, Amstelveen | Afghanistan by 1 wicket |
| ODI 3013 | 5 July | Scotland | Gordon Drummond | Ireland | Trent Johnston | Sportpark Westvliet, Voorburg | Ireland by 5 wickets |
| ODI 3014 | 5 July | Canada | Ashish Bagai | Netherlands | Peter Borren | Hazelaarweg, Rotterdam | Netherlands by 7 wickets |
| ODI 3015 | 7 July | Canada | Ashish Bagai | Ireland | Trent Johnston | VRA Ground, Amstelveen | Ireland by 5 wickets |
| ODI 3016 | 7 July | Scotland | Gordon Drummond | Kenya | Morris Ouma | Hazelaarweg, Rotterdam | Scotland by 6 runs |
| ODI 3017 | 7 July | Netherlands | Peter Borren | Afghanistan | Nowroz Mangal | Sportpark Westvliet, Voorburg | Afghanistan by 6 wickets |
| ODI 3019 | 9 July | Afghanistan | Nowroz Mangal | Scotland | Gordon Drummond | Hazelaarweg, Rotterdam | Scotland by 2 wickets |
| ODI 3020 | 9 July | Kenya | Morris Ouma | Canada | Ashish Bagai | Sportpark Thurlede, Schiedam | Canada by 6 wickets |
| ODI 3021 | 9 July | Ireland | Kevin O'Brien | Netherlands | Peter Borren | VRA Ground, Amstelveen | Ireland by 39 runs |
5th place playoff
| ODI 3022 | 10 July | Kenya | Morris Ouma | Canada | Ashish Bagai | Sportpark Thurlede, Schiedam | Canada by 3 wickets |
3rd place playoff
| ODI 3024 | 10 July | Afghanistan | Nowroz Mangal | Netherlands | Peter Borren | Hazelaarweg, Rotterdam | Afghanistan by 5 wickets |
Final
| ODI 3023 | 10 July | Scotland | Gordon Drummond | Ireland | Trent Johnston | VRA Ground, Amstelveen | Ireland by 6 wickets |

=== Australia vs Pakistan ===
| No. | Date | Home captain | Away captain | Venue | Result |
T20I series
| T20I 184 | 5 July | Shahid Afridi | Michael Clarke | Edgbaston, Birmingham | Pakistan by 23 runs |
| T20I 185 | 6 July | Shahid Afridi | Michael Clarke | Edgbaston, Birmingham | Pakistan by 11 runs |
Test series
| Test 1963 | 13–17 July | Shahid Afridi | Ricky Ponting | Lord's, London | Australia by 150 runs |
| Test 1965 | 21–25 July | Salman Butt | Ricky Ponting | Headingley, Leeds | Pakistan by 3 wickets |

=== Bangladesh in Ireland ===
| No. | Date | Home captain | Away captain | Venue | Result |
ODI series
| ODI 3027 | 15 July | Mashrafe Mortaza | William Porterfield | Civil Service Cricket Club, Stormont, Belfast | Ireland by 7 wickets |
| ODI 3028 | 16 July | Mashrafe Mortaza | William Porterfield | Civil Service Cricket Club, Stormont, Belfast | Bangladesh by 6 wickets (D/L) |

=== India in Sri Lanka ===
| No. | Date | Home captain | Away captain | Venue | Result |
Test series
| Test 1964 | 18–22 July | Kumar Sangakkara | Mahendra Singh Dhoni | Galle International Stadium, Galle | Sri Lanka by 10 wickets |
| Test 1966 | 26–30 July | Kumar Sangakkara | Mahendra Singh Dhoni | Sinhalese Sports Club, Colombo | Match drawn |
| Test 1968 | 3–7 August | Kumar Sangakkara | Mahendra Singh Dhoni | P. Sara Oval, Colombo | India by 5 wickets |

=== Bangladesh in Scotland ===
ODI series
| No. | Date | Home captain | Away captain | Venue | Result |
|---|---|---|---|---|---|
| ODI 3028a | 19 July | Gordon Drummond | Mashrafe Mortaza | Titwood, Glasgow | Match abandoned without a ball bowled |

=== Bangladesh Vs Netherlands in Scotland ===
ODI series
| No. | Date | Home captain | Away captain | Venue | Result |
|---|---|---|---|---|---|
| ODI 3029 | 20 July | Peter Borren | Mashrafe Mortaza | Titwood, Glasgow | Netherlands by 6 wickets |

=== Pakistan in England ===
| No. | Date | Home captain | Away captain | Venue | Result |
Test series
| Test 1967 | 29 July–2 August | Andrew Strauss | Salman Butt | Trent Bridge, Nottingham | England by 354 runs |
| Test 1969 | 6–10 August | Andrew Strauss | Salman Butt | Edgbaston, Birmingham | England by 9 wickets |
| Test 1970 | 18–22 August | Andrew Strauss | Salman Butt | Kennington Oval, London | Pakistan by 4 wickets |
| Test 1971 | 26–30 August | Andrew Strauss | Salman Butt | Lord's Cricket Ground, London | England by an innings and 225 runs |
T20I series
| T20I 186 | 5 September | Paul Collingwood | Shahid Afridi | Sophia Gardens, Cardiff | England by 5 wickets |
| T20I 187 | 7 September | Paul Collingwood | Shahid Afridi | Sophia Gardens, Cardiff | England by 6 wickets |
ODI series
| ODI 3042 | 10 September | Andrew Strauss | Shahid Afridi | Riverside Ground, Chester-le-Street | England by 24 runs |
| ODI 3044 | 12 September | Andrew Strauss | Shahid Afridi | Headingley, Leeds | England by 4 wickets |
| ODI 3045 | 17 September | Andrew Strauss | Shahid Afridi | Kennington Oval, London | Pakistan by 23 runs |
| ODI 3046 | 20 September | Andrew Strauss | Shahid Afridi | Lord's Cricket Ground, London | Pakistan by 38 runs |
| ODI 3047 | 22 September | Andrew Strauss | Shahid Afridi | Rose Bowl, Southampton | England by 121 runs |

== August ==
=== Sri Lanka Triangular Series ===
| Pos | Team | Pld | W | L | NR | T | BP | Pts | NRR |
|---|---|---|---|---|---|---|---|---|---|
| 1 | Sri Lanka | 4 | 2 | 1 | 1 | 0 | 1 | 11 | +0.960 |
| 2 | India | 4 | 2 | 2 | 0 | 0 | 2 | 10 | −0.946 |
| 3 | New Zealand | 4 | 1 | 2 | 1 | 0 | 1 | 7 | +0.394 |

ODI series
| No. | Date | Team 1 | Captain 1 | Team 2 | Captain 2 | Venue | Result |
Group stage
| ODI 3030 | 10 August | India | Mahendra Singh Dhoni | New Zealand | Ross Taylor | Rangiri Dambulla International Stadium, Dambulla | New Zealand by 200 runs |
| ODI 3031 | 13 August | Sri Lanka | Kumar Sangakkara | New Zealand | Ross Taylor | Rangiri Dambulla International Stadium, Dambulla | Sri Lanka by 3 wickets |
| ODI 3032 | 16 August | Sri Lanka | Kumar Sangakkara | India | Mahendra Singh Dhoni | Rangiri Dambulla International Stadium, Dambulla | India by 6 wickets |
| ODI 3037 | 19 August | Sri Lanka | Kumar Sangakkara | New Zealand | Ross Taylor | Rangiri Dambulla International Stadium, Dambulla | No result |
| ODI 3038 | 22 August | Sri Lanka | Kumar Sangakkara | India | Mahendra Singh Dhoni | Rangiri Dambulla International Stadium, Dambulla | Sri Lanka by 8 wickets |
| ODI 3039 | 25 August | India | Mahendra Singh Dhoni | New Zealand | Ross Taylor | Rangiri Dambulla International Stadium, Dambulla | India by 105 runs |
Final
| ODI 3040 | 28 August | Sri Lanka | Kumar Sangakkara | India | Mahendra Singh Dhoni | Rangiri Dambulla International Stadium, Dambulla | Sri Lanka by 74 runs |

=== WCL Division Four ===
==== Group stage ====
| Pos | Team | Pld | W | L | T | NR | Pts | NRR |
|---|---|---|---|---|---|---|---|---|
| 1 | United States | 5 | 4 | 1 | 0 | 0 | 8 | 2.005 |
| 2 | Italy | 5 | 4 | 1 | 0 | 0 | 8 | 1.130 |
| 3 | Nepal | 5 | 3 | 2 | 0 | 0 | 6 | 0.691 |
| 4 | Tanzania | 5 | 3 | 2 | 0 | 0 | 6 | −0.960 |
| 5 | Cayman Islands | 5 | 1 | 4 | 0 | 0 | 2 | −1.042 |
| 6 | Argentina | 5 | 0 | 5 | 0 | 0 | 0 | −1.991 |

Group stage
| No. | Date | Team 1 | Captain 1 | Team 2 | Captain 2 | Venue | Result |
|---|---|---|---|---|---|---|---|
| Match 1 | 14 August | United States | Steve Massiah | Nepal | Paras Khadka | Ovale di Rastignano, Pianoro | No result |
| Match 2 | 14 August | Italy | Alessandro Bonora | Cayman Islands | Saheed Mohamed | Centro Sportivo Ca'Nova, Medicina | Match abandoned without a ball bowled |
| Match 3 | 14 August | Tanzania | Hamisi Abdallah | Argentina | Billy MacDermott | Centro Sportivo Dozza, Navile | No result |
| Match 4 | 15 August | Italy | Alessandro Bonora | Nepal | Paras Khadka | Ovale di Rastignano, Pianoro | Nepal by 5 wickets |
| Match 5 | 15 August | Argentina | Billy MacDermott | Cayman Islands | Saheed Mohamed | Centro Sportivo Ca'Nova, Medicina | Match abandoned without a ball bowled |
| Match 6 | 15 August | United States | Steve Massiah | Tanzania | Hamisi Abdallah | Centro Sportivo Dozza, Navile | United States by 10 wickets |
| Match 5 replay | 16 August | Argentina | Billy MacDermott | Cayman Islands | Saheed Mohamed | Ovale di Rastignano, Pianoro | Cayman Islands by 5 wickets |
| Match 7 | 17 August | Italy | Alessandro Bonora | Argentina | Esteban MacDermott | Ovale di Rastignano, Pianoro | Italy by 60 runs |
| Match 8 | 17 August | Nepal | Paras Khadka | Tanzania | Hamisi Abdallah | Centro Sportivo Ca'Nova, Medicina | Tanzania by 9 runs |
| Match 9 | 17 August | United States | Steve Massiah | Cayman Islands | Saheed Mohamed | Centro Sportivo Dozza, Navile | United States by 9 wickets |
| Match 10 | 18 August | Cayman Islands | Saheed Mohamed | Tanzania | Hamisi Abdallah | Ovale di Rastignano, Pianoro | Tanzania by 43 runs |
| Match 11 | 18 August | Italy | Alessandro Bonora | United States | Steve Massiah | Centro Sportivo Ca'Nova, Medicina | Italy by 51 runs |
| Match 12 | 18 August | Nepal | Paras Khadka | Argentina | Esteban MacDermott | Centro Sportivo Dozza, Navile | Nepal by 8 wickets |
| Match 1 replay | 19 August | United States | Steve Massiah | Nepal | Paras Khadka | Ovale di Rastignano, Pianoro | United States by 55 runs |
| Match 2 replay | 19 August | Italy | Alessandro Bonora | Cayman Islands | Saheed Mohamed | Centro Sportivo Ca'Nova, Medicina | Italy by 47 runs |
| Match 3 replay | 19 August | Tanzania | Hamisi Abdallah | Argentina | Esteban MacDermott | Centro Sportivo Dozza, Navile | Tanzania by 3 wickets |
| Match 13 | 20 August | United States | Steve Massiah | Argentina | Esteban MacDermott | Ovale di Rastignano, Pianoro | United States by 196 runs |
| Match 14 | 20 August | Cayman Islands | Saheed Mohamed | Nepal | Paras Khadka | Centro Sportivo Ca'NovaMedicina | Nepal by 7 wickets |
| Match 15 | 20 August | Tanzania | Hamisi Abdallah | Italy | Alessandro Bonora | Centro Sportivo Dozza, Navile | Italy by 167 runs |
Playoffs
5th place playoff
| Match 16 | 21 August | Cayman Islands | Saheed Mohamed | Argentina | Esteban MacDermott | Bologna | Cayman Islands by 7 wickets |
3rd place playoff
| Match 17 | 21 August | Nepal | Paras Khadka | Tanzania | Hamisi Abdallah | Medicina | Nepal by 10 wickets |
Final
| Match 18 | 21 August | United States | Steve Massiah | Italy | Alessandro Bonora | Pianoro | United States by 8 wickets |

===== Final Placings =====
| Pos | Team | Status |
|---|---|---|
| 1st | United States | Promoted to Division Three for 2011 |
| 2nd | Italy | Promoted to Division Three for 2011 |
| 3rd | Nepal | Remained in Division Four for 2012 |
| 4th | Tanzania | Remained in Division Four for 2012 |
| 5th | Cayman Islands | Relegated to Division Five for 2012 |
| 6th | Argentina | Relegated to Division Five for 2012 |

=== Afghanistan in Scotland ===
| No. | Date | Home captain | Away captain | Venue | Result |
2009–10 ICC Intercontinental Cup
| First-class | 11–14 August | Gordon Drummond | Nowroz Mangal | Cambusdoon New Ground, Ayr | Afghanistan by 229 runs |
ODI series
| ODI 3033 | 16 August | Gordon Drummond | Nowroz Mangal | Cambusdoon New Ground, Ayr | Afghanistan by 9 wickets |
| ODI 3035 | 18 August | Gordon Drummond | Nowroz Mangal | Cambusdoon New Ground, Ayr | Scotland by 6 wickets |

=== Netherlands in Ireland ===
| No. | Date | Home captain | Away captain | Venue | Result |
2009–10 ICC Intercontinental Cup
| First-class | 11–13 August | Trent Johnston | Peter Borren | Observatory Lane, Rathmines, Dublin | Ireland by an innings and 84 runs |
ODI series
| ODI 3034 | 16 August | Trent Johnston | Peter Borren | Clontarf Cricket Club Ground, Dublin | Ireland by 70 runs |
| ODI 3036 | 18 August | Trent Johnston | Peter Borren | Clontarf Cricket Club Ground, Dublin | Ireland by 9 wickets |

== Season summary ==
=== Result Summary ===
| | Test | | | | | ODI | | | | | T20I | | | | |
| | Matches | Wins | Loss | Draw | Tied | Matches | Wins | Loss | Tied | No Result | Matches | Wins | Loss | Tied | No Result |
|---|---|---|---|---|---|---|---|---|---|---|---|---|---|---|---|
| Australia | 2 | 1 | 1 | 0 | 0 | 6 | 3 | 3 | 0 | 0 | 9 | 6 | 3 | 0 | 0 |
| Bangladesh | 2 | 0 | 2 | 0 | 0 | 9 | 2 | 7 | 0 | 0 | 2 | 0 | 2 | 0 | 0 |
| England | 6 | 5 | 1 | 0 | 0 | 14 | 9 | 5 | 0 | 0 | 9 | 7 | 1 | 0 | 1 |
| India | 3 | 1 | 1 | 1 | 0 | 11 | 5 | 6 | 0 | 0 | 7 | 4 | 3 | 0 | 0 |
| New Zealand | No Matches | | | | | 4 | 1 | 2 | 0 | 1 | 7 | 4 | 3 | 0 | 0 |
| Pakistan | 6 | 2 | 4 | 0 | 0 | 8 | 3 | 5 | 0 | 0 | 10 | 4 | 6 | 0 | 0 |
| South Africa | 3 | 2 | 0 | 1 | 0 | 5 | 5 | 0 | 0 | 0 | 7 | 4 | 3 | 0 | 0 |
| Sri Lanka | 3 | 1 | 1 | 1 | 0 | 12 | 8 | 3 | 0 | 1 | 8 | 4 | 4 | 0 | 0 |
| West Indies | 3 | 0 | 2 | 1 | 0 | 7 | 2 | 5 | 0 | 0 | 7 | 3 | 4 | 0 | 0 |
| | First-class | | | | | ODI | | | | | T20I | | | | |
| Zimbabwe | 0 | 0 | 0 | 0 | 0 | 5 | 3 | 2 | 0 | 0 | 4 | 0 | 4 | 0 | 0 |
| Afghanistan | 0 | 0 | 0 | 0 | 0 | 6 | 4 | 2 | 0 | 0 | 2 | 0 | 2 | 0 | 0 |
| Canada | 0 | 0 | 0 | 0 | 0 | 7 | 2 | 5 | 0 | 0 | 0 | 0 | 0 | 0 | 0 |
| Ireland | 0 | 0 | 0 | 0 | 0 | 10 | 7 | 3 | 0 | 0 | 2 | 0 | 1 | 1 | 0 |
| Kenya | 0 | 0 | 0 | 0 | 0 | 6 | 0 | 6 | 0 | 0 | 0 | 0 | 0 | 0 | 0 |
| Netherlands | 1 | 0 | 1 | 0 | 0 | 8 | 4 | 4 | 0 | 0 | 2 | 0 | 1 | 0 | 1 |
| Scotland | 1 | 1 | 0 | 0 | 0 | 8 | 4 | 4 | 0 | 0 | 0 | 0 | 0 | 0 | 0 |
| | First-class | | | | | List A | | | | | Twenty20 | | | | |
| Bermuda | 1 | 0 | 1 | 0 | 0 | 2 | 0 | 2 | 0 | 0 | 2 | 0 | 2 | 0 | 0 |
| Namibia | 0 | 0 | 0 | 0 | 0 | 0 | 0 | 0 | 0 | 0 | 0 | 0 | 0 | 0 | 0 |
| United Arab Emirates | 1 | 1 | 0 | 0 | 0 | 2 | 2 | 0 | 0 | 0 | 2 | 2 | 0 | 0 | 0 |
| Uganda | 0 | 0 | 0 | 0 | 0 | 3 | 2 | 1 | 0 | 0 | 0 | 0 | 0 | 0 | 0 |
| | First-class | | | | | List A | | | | | Twenty20 | | | | |
| Argentina | No First-class Status | | | | | 5 | 1 | 3 | 1 | 0 | 1 | 0 | 1 | 0 | 0 |
| Bahamas | No First-class Status | | | | | 5 | 0 | 4 | 1 | 0 | 2 | 0 | 2 | 0 | 0 |
| Bahrain | No First-class Status | | | | | 0 | 0 | 0 | 0 | 0 | 0 | 0 | 0 | 0 | 0 |
| Bhutan | No First-class Status | | | | | 3 | 0 | 3 | 0 | 0 | 0 | 0 | 0 | 0 | 0 |
| Cayman Islands | No First-class Status | | | | | 5 | 1 | 4 | 0 | 0 | 2 | 1 | 1 | 0 | 0 |
| Hong Kong | No First-class Status | | | | | 0 | 0 | 0 | 0 | 0 | 0 | 0 | 0 | 0 | 0 |
| Kuwait | No First-class Status | | | | | 4 | 1 | 3 | 0 | 0 | 0 | 0 | 0 | 0 | 0 |
| Malaysia | No First-class Status | | | | | 0 | 0 | 0 | 0 | 0 | 0 | 0 | 0 | 0 | 0 |
| Nepal | No First-class Status | | | | | 0 | 0 | 0 | 0 | 0 | 0 | 0 | 0 | 0 | 0 |
| Oman | No First-class Status | | | | | 4 | 2 | 2 | 0 | 0 | 0 | 0 | 0 | 0 | 0 |
| Singapore | No First-class Status | | | | | 4 | 0 | 4 | 0 | 0 | 0 | 0 | 0 | 0 | 0 |
| United States | No First-class Status | | | | | 5 | 4 | 1 | 0 | 0 | 1 | 1 | 0 | 0 | 0 |

=== Milestones ===
==== Test ====
- (South Africa) Jacques Kallis reached 11,000 runs scored in Tests, vs West Indies on 19 June. (6th in All time)
- (Australia) Ricky Ponting reached 12,000 runs scored in Tests, vs Pakistan on 22 July. (2nd in All time)
- (Sri Lanka) Muttiah Muralitharan reached 800 wickets taken in Tests, vs India on 22 July. (1st in All time)
- (India) Sachin Tendulkar reached 14,000 runs scored in Tests vs Australia.(1st in All time)
- (India) Sachin Tendulkar became the first batsman to reach 50 Test Centuries in Tests vs South Africa. (1st in All time)

==== ODI ====
- (Australia) Ricky Ponting reached 13,000 runs scored in ODIs, vs England on 30 June. (3rd in All time)
- (Sri Lanka) Mahela Jayawardene reached 9,000 runs scored in ODIs, vs India on 28 August. (13th in All time)

==== T20I ====
- (New Zealand) Brendon McCullum reached 1,000 runs scored in T20Is, vs Zimbabwe on 4 May. (1st in All time)

=== Records ===
==== Test ====
(India) Sachin Tendulkar played highest number of Test Matches (176*) vs South Africa on 26 December.

(Pakistan) Mohammad Amir became the youngest player to take 5 wickets in England (18 years 130 days).

Jonathan Trott and Stuart Broad set the highest 8th wicket partnership, 332 runs, in Test history in the 4th Test Match between England and Pakistan at Lords.

==== ODI ====
(India) Sachin Tendulkar scored 200* vs South Africa 1st Double century in History of ODI Cricket
