= Indian cricket team in South Africa in 2006–07 =

International cricket tour

India in South Africa 2006–07
	South Africa	India
- Dates: 16 November 2006 – 6 January 2007
Captains	Graeme Smith	Rahul Dravid (Tests & ODIs); Virender Sehwag (T20I and 2 ODIs)

Test series
- Result: South Africa won the 3-match series 2–1
Most runs	Ashwell Prince (306)	Sourav Ganguly (214)
Most wickets	Makhaya Ntini (15)	S. Sreesanth (18)
- Player of the series: Shaun Pollock (SA)

One Day International series
- Results: South Africa won the 5-match series 4–0
Most runs	AB de Villiers (175)	MS Dhoni (139)
Most wickets	Shaun Pollock (10)	Zaheer Khan (6)
- Player of the series: Shaun Pollock (SA)

Twenty20 International series
- Results: India won the 1-match series 1–0
Most runs	Albie Morkel (27)	Dinesh Mongia (38)
Most wickets	Charl Langeveldt (2)	Zaheer Khan (2); Ajit Agarkar (2)
- Player of the series: Dinesh Karthik (Ind)

The Indian cricket team toured South Africa for three Tests, five Odis & one T20I from 16 November 2006 to 6 January 2007.

South Africa won the Test series 2–1. After India won the first Test at New Wanderers Stadium in Johannesburg, South Africa rallied to win the 2nd Test at Kingsmead in Durban and the third Test at Newlands in Cape Town.

South Africa won the ODI series 4–0, which was India's first ODI series without a win since 1997.

There was also one Twenty20 International, which India won.

== Schedule ==
No.	Date	Home captain	Away captain	Venue	Result
Tour Games
One Day	16 Nov 2006	Ashwell Prince	Rahul Dravid	Willowmoore Park	South Africa won by 37 runs
FC match	7–10 Dec 2006	Jacques Rudolph	VVS Laxman	Sedgars Park	India won by 96 runs
One-day International Series
1st ODI	19 Nov 2006	Graeme Smith	Rahul Dravid	New Wanderers Stadium	Match abandoned due to rain.
2nd ODI	22 Nov 2006	Graeme Smith	Rahul Dravid	Kingsmead	South Africa won by 157 runs
3rd ODI	26 Nov 2006	Graeme Smith	Rahul Dravid	Newlands	South Africa won by 106 runs
4th ODI	29 Nov 2006	Graeme Smith	Virender Sehwag	St George's Park	South Africa won by 80 runs
5th ODI	3 Dec 2006	Graeme Smith	Virender Sehwag	SuperSport Park	South Africa won by 9 wickets
Twenty20 International
1st 20/20	1 Dec 2006	Graeme Smith	Virender Sehwag	New Wanderers Stadium	India won by 6 wickets
Test Series
1st Test	15–19 Dec 2006	Graeme Smith	Rahul Dravid	New Wanderers Stadium	India won by 123 runs
2nd Test	26–30 Dec 2006	Graeme Smith	Rahul Dravid	Kingsmead	South Africa won by 174 runs
3rd Test	2–6 Jan 2007	Graeme Smith	Rahul Dravid	Newlands	South Africa won by 5 wickets

== Squads ==
Indian ODI Squad
Rahul Dravid (Captain) | Sachin Tendulkar | Virender Sehwag | Suresh Raina | Mohammad Kaif | Ajit Agarkar | Dinesh Mongia | Harbhajan Singh

Anil Kumble | Wasim Jaffer | Zaheer Khan | Mahendra Dhoni (wk) | Irfan Pathan | Munaf Patel | Dinesh Karthik (wk) | S Sreesanth | VVS Laxman

Indian Test Squad
Rahul Dravid (Captain) | Sachin Tendulkar | Virender Sehwag | V. R. V. Singh | | Sourav Ganguly | Gautam Gambhir | Harbhajan Singh

Anil Kumble | Wasim Jaffer | Zaheer Khan | Irfan Pathan* | Mahendra Dhoni (wk) | Munaf Patel | Dinesh Karthik (wk) | S Sreesanth | VVS Laxman

- Irfan Pathan was sent back home before the second test due to poor bowling form.

South Africa ODI Squad
Graeme Smith (Captain) | Loots Bosman | Mark Boucher (wk) | AB de Villiers (wk) | Boeta Dippenaar | Herschelle Gibbs

Andrew Hall | Justin Kemp | Jacques Kallis | Charl Langeveldt | André Nel | Makhaya Ntini | Robin Peterson | Shaun Pollock | Ashwell Prince

South Africa Test Squad
Graeme Smith (Captain) | Jacques Kallis | Mark Boucher (wk) | Abraham de Villiers | Jacques Rudolph | Herschelle Gibbs

Andrew Hall | Nicky Boje | Paul Harris | Dale Steyn | André Nel | Makhaya Ntini | Hashim Amla | Shaun Pollock | Ashwell Prince

== Tour Match ==
=== Tour Match: Rest of South Africa v Indians, 16 November ===
16 November (D/N)
Scorecard

Rest of South Africa; 255/8 (50 overs)	v	Indians; 218 (49.1 overs)
Jacques Rudolph 72* (53); Zaheer Khan 3/43 (10 overs)		Rahul Dravid 79 (99); Dale Steyn 5/22 (10 overs)

Rest of South Africa won by 37 runs
Willowmoore Park, Benoni
Umpires: Ian Howell and Brian Jerling
Player of the match: Dale Steyn (Rest of South Africa)

- Rest of South Africa won the toss and decided to bat

== ODI series ==
=== 1st ODI ===
19 November (D/N)
Scorecard

South Africa	v	India

Match abandoned
New Wanderers Stadium, Johannesburg
Umpires: Billy Doctrove (WI) and Brian Jerling (SA)

- No toss.
- Persistent rain prevented any play.

=== 2nd ODI ===
22 November (D/N)
Scorecard

South Africa; 248/8 (50 overs)	v	India; 91 (29.1 overs)
Jacques Kallis 119* (160); Munaf Patel 2/39 (10 overs)		Sachin Tendulkar 35 (51); André Nel 4/13 (8 overs)

South Africa won by 157 runs
Kingsmead, Durban
Umpires: Billy Doctrove (WI) and Ian Howell (SA)
Player of the match: Jacques Kallis (SA)

- South Africa won the toss and elected to bat first.
- Wasim Jaffer (Ind) made his ODI debut.

=== 3rd ODI ===
26 November
Scorecard

South Africa; 274/7 (50 overs)	v	India; 168 (41.3 overs)
Justin Kemp 100* (89); Zaheer Khan 3/42 (10 overs)		Rahul Dravid 63 (103); Shaun Pollock 4/26 (9 overs)

South Africa won by 106 runs
Newlands, Cape Town
Umpires: Billy Doctrove (WI) and Brian Jerling (SA)
Player of the match: Justin Kemp (SA)

- South Africa won the toss and elected to bat first.

=== 4th ODI ===
29 November (D/N)
Scorecard

South Africa; 243/8 (50 overs)	v	India; 163 (38.1 overs)
Herschelle Gibbs 93* (123); Anil Kumble 2/42 (10 overs)		Irfan Pathan 47* (55); Justin Kemp 3/21 (4.1 overs)

South Africa won by 80 runs
St George's Park, Port Elizabeth
Umpires: Billy Doctrove (WI) and Brian Jerling (SA)
Player of the match: Herschelle Gibbs (SA)

- South Africa won the toss and elected to bat first.

Virender Sehwag captained India after Rahul Dravid was ruled out for rest of the series following an injury. South Africa recovered from a bad start to reach 243 at the end of 50 overs. Gibbs remained unbeaten on 93 while Kallis and Pollock chipped in with 49 and 37 respectively. Anil Kumble was the best bowler for India on the day picking up 2 wickets for 42 runs. Chasing 244 under lights, India got off to a steady start losing their first wicket in the 6th over with 23 runs on the board. Wickets fell at regular intervals and this meant that India never had a chance of overhauling the South African score. Irfan Pathan was the pick of the batsmen scoring 47 runs.

=== 5th ODI ===
3 December
Scorecard

India; 200/9 (50 overs)	v	South Africa; 201/1 (31.2 overs)
Sachin Tendulkar 55 (97); Makhaya Ntini 3/32 (10 overs)		AB de Villiers 92* (98); Harbhajan Singh 1/39 (8 overs)

South Africa won by 9 wickets
SuperSport Park, Centurion
Umpires: Billy Doctrove (WI) and Ian Howell (SA)
Player of the match: Shaun Pollock (SA)

- South Africa won the toss and elected to field.

India put on another abysmal batting performance scoring just 200 off the allocated 50 overs. Sachin Tendulkar topscored for the visitors with a sedate 55 off 97 balls. Mongia and Dhoni chipped in with useful 40's.

South Africa reached the target in just 31.2 overs. Pollock was named Man of the Match for his bowling performance which included 4 maidens and 2 wickets.

With this victory, South Africa wrapped up the series 4–0 with the first game washed out.

== Only T20I ==
1 December
Scorecard

South Africa; 126/9 (20 Overs)	v	India; 127/4 (19.5 Overs)
Albie Morkel 26 (18); Ajit Agarkar 2/10 (2.3 Overs)		Dinesh Mongia 38 (45); Charl Langeveldt 2/20 (4 Overs)

India won by 6 wickets
New Wanderers Stadium, Johannesburg
Umpires: Ian Howell (SA) and Brian Jerling (SA)
Player of the match: Dinesh Karthik (Ind)

- South Africa won the toss and elected to bat.
- This is India's first T20I match.
- Tyron Henderson (SA), Virender Sehwag, Sachin Tendulkar, Dinesh Mongia, MS Dhoni, Dinesh Karthik, Suresh Raina, Irfan Pathan, Harbhajan Singh, Zaheer Khan, Ajit Agarkar and S Sreesanth (Ind) all made their T20I debuts.
- Virender Sehwag (Ind) captained India for the first time in T20Is.

India pulled off its first victory of the tour with a close Twenty20 win after Dinesh Karthik steered India towards victory with a controlled innings by Twenty20 standards. This was India's first Twenty20 International ever.

== Test Series ==
=== Tour Match: Rest of South Africa v India (7–10 December) ===
6–10 December
Scorecard

India	v	Rest of South Africa
316/7 (85 overs); Irfan Pathan 111* (176); Morné Morkel 4/74 (19 overs)		138 (31.4 overs); Vaughn van Jaarsveld 52 (57); Sreesanth 4/55 (11.4 overs)
142 (53.4 overs); Irfan Pathan 40* (66); Alfonso Thomas 7/56 (21.4 overs)		224 (48.5 overs); Vaughn van Jaarsveld 66 (70); Zaheer Khan 3/36 (13 overs)

India won by 96 runs
Sedgars Park, Potchefstroom
Umpires: Marais Erasmus and Karl Hurter
Player of the match: Irfan Pathan (Indians)

- Rest of South Africa won the toss and elected to field.

=== First Test ===
15–19 December
Scorecard

India	v	South Africa
249 (79.5 overs); Sourav Ganguly 51* (101); Shaun Pollock 4/39 (17.5 overs)		84 (25.1 overs); Ashwell Prince 24 (60); S. Sreesanth 5/40 (10 overs)
236 (64.4 overs); VVS Laxman 73 (154); Shaun Pollock 3/33 (16 overs)		278 (86.5 overs); Ashwell Prince 97 (223); Anil Kumble 3/54 (20 overs)

India won by 123 runs
New Wanderers Stadium, Johannesburg
Umpires: Mark Benson (Eng) and Daryl Harper (Aus)
Player of the match: S. Sreesanth (Ind)

- India won the toss and elected to bat.

India beat South Africa by 123 runs and took a 1–0 lead in the series. This was also India's first test victory in South African soil.

=== Second Test ===
26–30 December
Scorecard

South Africa	v	India
328 (91.3 overs); Ashwell Prince 121 (212); S. Sreesanth 4/109 (24 overs)		240 (77.5 overs); Sachin Tendulkar 63 (115); Makhaya Ntini 2/41 (15 overs)
265/8 (67.4 overs); Shaun Pollock 63 (99); S. Sreesanth 4/80 (19 overs)		179 (55.1 overs); MS Dhoni 47 (67); Makhaya Ntini 5/48 (19 overs)

South Africa won by 174 runs
Kingsmead, Durban
Umpires: Asad Rauf (Pak), Mark Benson (Eng) and Ian Howell (SA)
Player of the match: Makhaya Ntini (SA)

- South Africa won the toss and elected to bat.

=== Third Test ===
2–6 January
Scorecard

India	v	South Africa
414 (151.1 overs); Wasim Jaffer 116 (244); Shaun Pollock 4/75 (29.1 overs)		373 (128.3 overs); Graeme Smith 94 (142); Anil Kumble 4/117 (42.3 overs)
169 (64 overs); Rahul Dravid 47 (134); Dale Steyn 4/30 (7 overs)		211/5 (64.1 overs); Graeme Smith 55 (84); Zaheer Khan 4/62 (21 overs)

South Africa won by 5 Wickets
Newlands Cricket Ground, Cape Town
Umpires: Asad Rauf (Pak) and Daryl Harper (Aus)
Player of the match: Graeme Smith (SA)

- India won the toss and elected to bat.
