= PSO Tri-Nation Tournament =

- Sponsor of Tri-Nation Tournament
- Date: August 29, 2002 – September 7, 2002
- Location: Kenya
- Result: Shared - Australian and Pakistan
- Player of the series: Matthew Hayden, Misbah-ul-Haq and Martin Suji
Teams
Australia	Kenya	Pakistan
Captains
Ricky Ponting	Steve Tikolo	Waqar Younis
Most runs
Hayden (265)	Otieno (127)	Y.Khan (146)
Most wickets
Gillespie (15)	Odoyo, M.Suji (4)	Akram (8)

The PSO Tri-Nation Tournament was a One Day International cricket tournament hosted by Kenya in 2002. The hosts were joined by Australia and Pakistan for the Round-robin tournament where each team played one another twice. The tournament acted as good preparation for the teams as the continent would be hosting the World Cup half a dozen months later.

After topping the group, the unbeaten Australians took on Pakistan in the final. The Pakistanis batted first and posted 227 but with Australia at 1 for 67 in their chase the rain intervened and the game was declared a 'no result'. The tournament was thus shared between Australia and Pakistan. Man of the series went to one man from each team, Matthew Hayden, Misbah-ul-Haq and Martin Suji.

== Points table ==
Place	Team	Played	Won	Lost	Points	NetRR
1	Australia	4	4	0	19	+2.925
2	Pakistan	4	2	2	10	-1.386
3	Kenya	4	0	4	0	-1.373

== Group matches ==
=== 1st match ===
29 August 2002
Scorecard

Kenya; 133 (30.3 overs)	v	Pakistan; 134/6 (33.3 overs)
KO Otieno 37 (72); Abdul Razzaq 4/35 (8 overs)		Younis Khan 36 (75); MA Suji 2/22 (10 overs)

Pakistan won by 4 wickets
Gymkhana Club Ground, Nairobi
Umpires: Aleem Dar (PAK) and RE Koertzen (SA)
Player of the match: Abdul Razzaq (PAK)

- Pakistan won the toss and elected to field.
- Points: Kenya 0; Pakistan 5

=== 2nd match ===
30 August 2002
Scorecard

Australia; 332/5 (50 overs)	v	Pakistan; 108 (36 overs)
ML Hayden 146 (128); Shahid Afridi 2/56 (10 overs)		Azhar Mahmood 32 (51); JN Gillespie 5/22 (10 overs)

Australia won by 224 runs
Gymkhana Club Ground, Nairobi
Umpires: Nadeem Ghauri (PAK) and RB Tiffin (ZIM)
Player of the match: ML Hayden (AUS)

- Pakistan won the toss and elected to field.
- Points: Australia 5; Pakistan 0

=== 3rd match ===
1 September 2002
Scorecard

Kenya; 179 (42.3 overs)	v	Pakistan; 181/3 (38.4 overs)
KO Otieno 59 (85); Shoaib Akhtar 2/17 (8 overs)		Younis Khan 87* (91); JO Angara 1/21 (6 overs)

Pakistan won by 7 wickets
Gymkhana Club Ground, Nairobi
Umpires: Aleem Dar (PAK) and RE Koertzen (SA)
Player of the match: Younis Khan (PAK)

- Kenya won the toss and elected to bat.
- Points: Kenya 0; Pakistan 5

=== 4th match ===
2 September 2002
Scorecard

Kenya; 84 (35.3 overs)	v	Australia; 85/2 (17 overs)
BJ Patel 28 (65); GD McGrath 3/8 (8 overs)		ML Hayden 40* (49); MA Suji 1/25 (8 overs)

Australia won by 8 wickets
Gymkhana Club Ground, Nairobi
Umpires: Nadeem Ghauri (PAK) and RB Tiffin (ZIM)
Player of the match: GD McGrath (AUS)

- Australia won the toss and elected to field.
- Points: Kenya 0; Australia 5

=== 5th match ===
4 September 2002
Scorecard

Pakistan; 117 (32.3 overs)	v	Australia; 121/1 (19.1 overs)
Misbah-ul-Haq 39 (50); B Lee 4/32 (8 overs)		ML Hayden 59* (48); Waqar Younis 1/26 (4 overs)

Australia won by 9 wickets
Gymkhana Club Ground, Nairobi
Umpires: Aleem Dar (PAK) and RE Koertzen (SA)
Player of the match: B Lee (AUS)

- Pakistan won the toss and elected to bat.
- Points: Australia 5; Pakistan 0

=== 6th match ===
5 September 2002
Scorecard

Kenya; 204/9 (50 overs)	v	Australia; 205/5 (49.1 overs)
MO Odumbe 55 (56); NM Hauritz 4/39 (10 overs)		SR Watson 77* (113); TM Odoyo 2/38 (9.1 overs)

Australia won by 5 wickets
Gymkhana Club Ground, Nairobi
Umpires: Nadeem Ghauri (PAK) and RB Tiffin (ZIM)
Player of the match: MO Odumbe (KEN)

- Kenya won the toss and elected to bat.
- Points: Kenya 0; Australia 4

== Final ==
7 September 2002
Scorecard

Pakistan; 227 (50 overs)	v	Australia; 67/1 (9.3 overs)
Abdul Razzaq 59 (43); JN Gillespie 5/70 (10 overs)		RT Ponting 29* (33); Wasim Akram 1/33 (5 overs)

No result (D/L method)
Gymkhana Club Ground, Nairobi
Umpires: Aleem Dar (PAK) and RB Tiffin (ZIM)
Player of the match: No award

- Pakistan won the toss and elected to bat.
- Australia's target was 210 runs in 42 overs.
- The trophy was shared by Australia and Pakistan.
