= National Cricket Stadium, Tangier =

Cricket ground in Morocco

Coordinates: 35°46′18″N 5°51′21″W

National Cricket Stadium
- Interactive map of National Cricket Stadium

Ground information
- Location: Tangier, Morocco
- Country: Morocco
- Capacity: 5,000
- Owner: Government of Morocco
- Operator: Moroccan Cricket Association
- End names
- Pavilion End; Cape Spartel End

International information
- First men's ODI: 12 August 2002: Pakistan v South Africa
- Last men's ODI: 21 August 2002: South Africa v Sri Lanka

Team information
Morocco	(2004)
- As of 20 July 2009; Source: Ground profile

The National Cricket Stadium was a cricket ground located in Tangiers, Morocco. It was the only stadium in Morocco that had been used for senior cricket.

The stadium hosted its first international tournament from 12 to 21 August 2002. Pakistan, South Africa and Sri Lanka competed in a 50-over one day triangular series.

The ICC granted international status to the stadium, providing official approval that allowed it to become North Africa's first international cricket venue.

== History ==
The stadium was constructed by Dubai-based construction tycoon Abdul Rahman Bukhatir as part of his plan to globalise cricket and spread it throughout the Arab world.

The ground was selected to hold the 2002 Morocco Cup, which was a One Day International tri-series competition involving Pakistan, South Africa and Sri Lanka. Seven One Day Internationals were played during the competition, with Sri Lanka eventually winning it.

This was the first time One Day Internationals had been held by an affiliate member nation of the International Cricket Council, though top-class cricket hasn't returned to the ground since.

In 2004, Morocco played two matches there against the touring Marylebone Cricket Club.

== Facilities ==
- Practice area: 6 turf wickets and 2 concrete wickets
- Stadium capacity: 5000
- Bowling machines
- Large changing rooms for players
- Availability for hire upon request
- Fitness Centre
- SPA: massage, jacuzzi, beauty salon, aromatherapy, reflexology
- Sports centre with multiple usage
- 72 equipped suites
- 56 bungalows
- Restaurant
- Clubhouse

== Decline ==
The stadium has gradually fallen into decline, in doing so casting a shadow over the future of Moroccan Cricket.

Due to mismanagement and a lack of funds, the stadium has not been maintained. The wicket that once existed is now a feeding ground for sheep, and there is a digger stuck in mud in the outfield. Cricket matches have not been played in the stadium since 2013.

== List of Centuries ==
=== One Day Internationals ===
No.	Score	Player	Team	Balls	Inns.	Opposing team	Date	Result
1	114	Herschelle Gibbs	South Africa	130	1	Pakistan	12 August 2002	Won

== List of Five Wicket Hauls ==
=== One Day Internationals ===
No.	Bowler	Date	Team	Opposing team	Inn	Overs	Runs	Wkts	Econ	Batsmen	Result
1	Waqar Younis	12 August 2002	Pakistan	South Africa	1	10	38	5	3.80	Gary Kirsten; Jacques Kallis; Mark Boucher; Shaun Pollock; Lance Klusener	Lost
