= Herschelle Gibbs =

South African cricketer (born 1974)

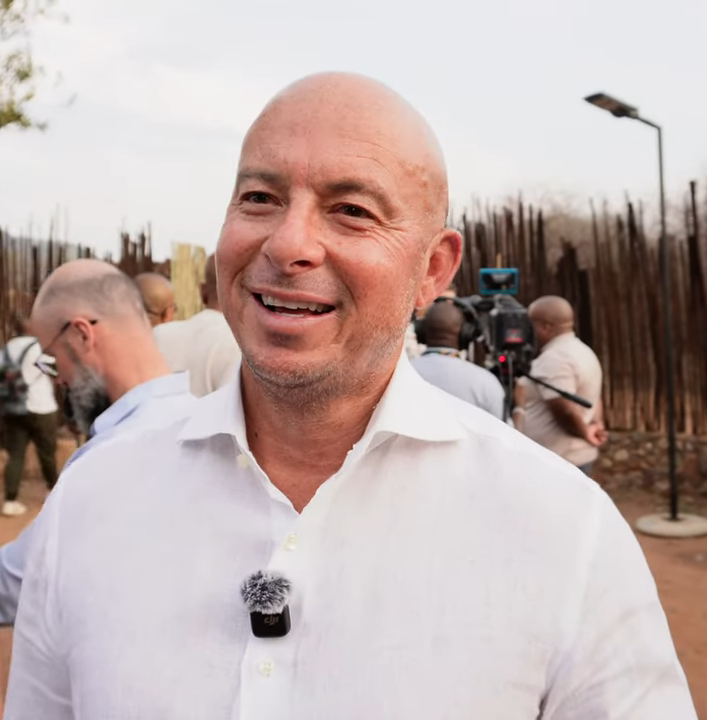
- Gibbs in 2025

Personal information
- Full name: Herschelle Herman Gibbs
- Born: 23 February 1974 (age 52); Cape Town, Western Cape, South Africa
- Height: 5 ft 10 in (178 cm)
- Batting: Right-handed
- Bowling: Right arm medium
- Role: Opening batsman

International information
- National side: South Africa (1996–2010)
- Test debut (cap 264): 27 November 1996 v India
- Last Test: 10 January 2008 v West Indies
- ODI debut (cap 42): 3 October 1996 v Kenya
- Last ODI: 27 February 2010 v India
- T20I debut (cap 3): 21 October 2005 v New Zealand
- Last T20I: 10 May 2010 v Pakistan

Domestic team information
- Years: Team
- 1990/91–2003/04: Western Province
- 2005/06–2011/12: Cape Cobras
- 2008–2010: Deccan Chargers
- 2008–2009: Glamorgan
- 2010: Yorkshire
- 2010/11: Northern Districts
- 2011/12–2012/13: Perth Scorchers
- 2012: Khulna Royal Bengals
- 2012: Mumbai Indians
- 2012: Durham
- 2012/13: Titans
- 2013: St Lucia Zouks

Career statistics
Competition	Test	ODI	T20I
Matches	90	248	23
Runs scored	6,167	8,094	400
Batting average	41.95	36.13	18.18
100s/50s	14/26	21/37	0/3
Top score	228	175	90*
Catches/stumpings	94/–	108/–	8/–
Medal record
Representing South Africa
Men's Cricket
Commonwealth Games
Gold medal – first place	1998 Kuala Lumpur	Team
- Source: ESPNcricinfo, 4 August 2017

Herschelle Herman Gibbs (born 23 February 1974) is a South African cricket coach and former cricketer, who played all formats of the game for fourteen years. A right-handed batsman, who mostly opened the batting, Gibbs became the first player to hit six consecutive sixes in one over in One Day International (ODI) cricket, doing so against the Netherlands in the 2007 Cricket World Cup.

Regarded as one of the most naturally talented cricketers South Africa has ever produced, Gibbs was also known as an excellent fielder. A report by ESPNcricinfo in 2005 showed that since the 1999 Cricket World Cup, he had effected the eighth highest number of run-outs in ODI cricket of any fieldsman, with the tenth highest success rate.

== Personal life ==
Gibbs was schooled at St Joseph's Marist College and then Diocesan College in Rondebosch. Gibbs was a gifted sportsman at school featuring in SA Schools teams for rugby, cricket and soccer.

At Diocesan College Gibbs played for their first rugby XV in the same team alongside Robbie Fleck, Selborne Boome and Dave von Hoesslin who went on to become Springboks. Gibbs also played alongside Springboks player Percy Montgomery for Western Province in Craven Week 1992.

Gibbs fathered a son with partner Liesl Fuller in 1996. In June 2007, Gibbs married Tenielle Povey in St Kitts, but divorced soon afterwards. In 2019, a court ordered him to pay 4500 rands per month for child care of a baby belonging to him and a woman with whom he had an affair. He became engaged to Dana Németh in June 2023.

== International career ==
Gibbs has scored two double centuries in his Test career, both contrasting innings. His first was an innings of 211 not out against New Zealand at Jade Stadium in 1999. His innings took 468 balls while his second double century, 228 against Pakistan came off just 240 balls. In that innings in Newlands, he reached a national record partnership of 368 with Graeme Smith. He has put on a further two 300-run opening stands with his captain, making them the only pair in Test history to break 300 on three occasions. He also holds the South African second wicket record, a partnership of 315* with Jacques Kallis.

Gibbs famously dropped a catch in a World Cup game against Australia in 1999, when he attempted to throw the ball up into the air in celebration before he had full control of it. The player that he dropped, Steve Waugh, went on to make a century and win the game for Australia, a victory which also gave the Australian side the momentum they required to go on and win the tournament. It was claimed at the time that, immediately after the dropped catch, Waugh had "sledged" Gibbs with the statement, "You've just dropped the World Cup", but, in his autobiography Out of My Comfort Zone, Waugh denies this. Waugh did state, however, that teammate Shane Warne had noticed that Gibbs had developed a habit of throwing the ball in the air prematurely after taking catches and instructed his colleagues not to leave the crease too quickly if they happened to be caught by Gibbs, just in case the situation that happened to Waugh should actually occur.

=== Record breaking ===
Gibbs is one of only ten batsmen in ODI history to score hundreds in three consecutive innings, the others being Zaheer Abbas, Saeed Anwar, AB de Villiers, Quinton de Kock, Ross Taylor, Kumar Sangakkara, Rohit Sharma, Virat Kohli and Babar Azam. Sangakkara became the only player to hit four consecutive ODI hundreds, during 2015 cricket world cup. On 6 October 2002, in Potchefstroom, in a match against Bangladeshis, Gibbs had a chance to become the first ever batsman to score four hundreds in a row. South Africa was set the target of 155 for victory, and Gibbs fell just three runs short, finishing unbeaten on 97. With just six runs needed for victory, he had the strike on 96, but Alok Kapali bowled a legside wide that went for four and made his task almost impossible.

On 12 March 2006, Gibbs scored 175 off just 111 balls and led South Africa to victory in the 5th ODI against Australia. What made the innings even more remarkable was that he was hungover from the night before after drinking with a friend until about 1 am, something he would reveal in his autobiography years later. He was batting with Graeme Smith after Boeta Dippenaar was out on 1(3) bowled by Nathan Bracken. This was the highest-scoring One Day International match in history, and his innings broke several batting records. It was the highest-ever score made in an ODI against Australia, beating Robin Smith's effort in 1993. By bringing up his hundred off just 79 balls, he also brought up what was at the time the fastest ever ODI century against Australia. More importantly, however, it was the fastest-ever hundred by a South African batsman against any opposition, although the record would be broken later in the year by Mark Boucher. It was also the highest-ever score by a batsman in South Africa. He scored 126 runs in boundaries, the most ever by a batsman. This record stood until 11 April 2011, when Shane Watson hit 150 runs in boundaries against Bangladesh.

In the match against the Netherlands in the group stage of the 2007 Cricket World Cup, Gibbs hit six sixes in an over off the bowling of Daan van Bunge, becoming the first player in One Day International history to do so. Ravi Shastri and Sir Garfield Sobers had previously achieved this feat in first-class cricket, but to date no player has achieved this in Test Cricket. In doing so, he raised US$1 million for the Habitat for Humanity housing projects as part of a contest run by tournament sponsor Johnnie Walker. It is likely that his being awarded citizenship of St Kitts and Nevis was due to this feat. His six-hitting form continued throughout the tournament; and, when he hit Jacob Oram into the stands during a Super Eight match, he drew level with Australian batsman Ricky Ponting on 28 for most sixes in World Cup history.

=== Struggle with form ===
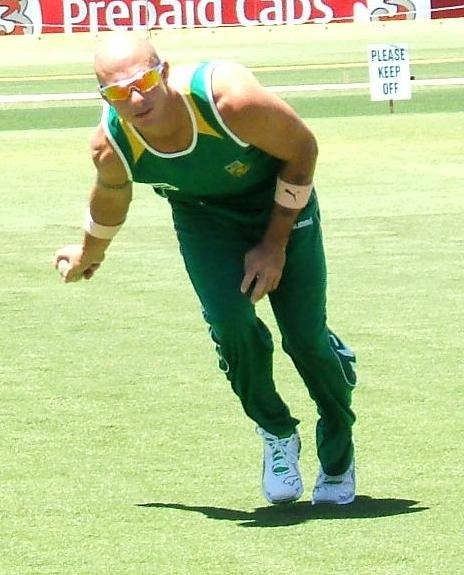
Gibbs at fielding practice, Adelaide Oval, January 2009.

In the past two series against England and the West Indies he was brought down the order from the opening batsman to the middle order due to lack of form. After the move he regained form and looked more comfortable batting against the older ball. On 22 April 2006, Gibbs paid the price for his recent run drought, and was dropped for the second and third Tests against the New Zealand cricket team. He has been short of confidence in Test cricket of late, and scored only 6 and 2 in the First Test at Centurion Park. South Africa's chief selector, Haroon Lorgat, said, "We had a meeting and agreed that a break and a fresh start next season will do him a world of good." This decision was widely viewed as a harsh one.

He came back into the side in the middle order but continued to struggle for runs. On the conclusion of the 1st Test against Pakistan in January 2007 he had gone over 2 years without scoring a century. He had come close on many occasions to ending the drought, getting out in the nineties four times.

In April 2009, his sixteen One Day International innings since the March 2008 one-day series in Bangladesh having yielded just three fifties, even Stuart Hess, his most ardent media supporter, was moved to cast doubt over his future. Hess had famously recommended Gibbs as captaincy successor to Shaun Pollock in 2003, but now, noting that his "average, as an opener, in that same period is 25.25, more than 10 runs below his overall average of 35.87", Hess felt "a sense that Gibbs is living off past deeds and not playing with the requisite form needed to hold on to a national spot." He noted, however, that Gibbs was the only South African with more than 1,000 World Cup runs and that, of the twelve others, only Sachin Tendulkar with 57.93 and Sir Viv Richards with 63.31 had better averages:

Perhaps putting up with Gibbs's current inconsistent streak may just have to be the pay-off South Africa have to make if it means he can help guide the national side to greater glory in two years time.

After being dropped from the side Gibbs stated that he wanted to perform well in the domestic cup and that he was feeling well about it. He stated that his aim was to play in the 2011 Cricket World Cup

His Test career came to an end following the 2007/08 West Indies tour of South Africa.

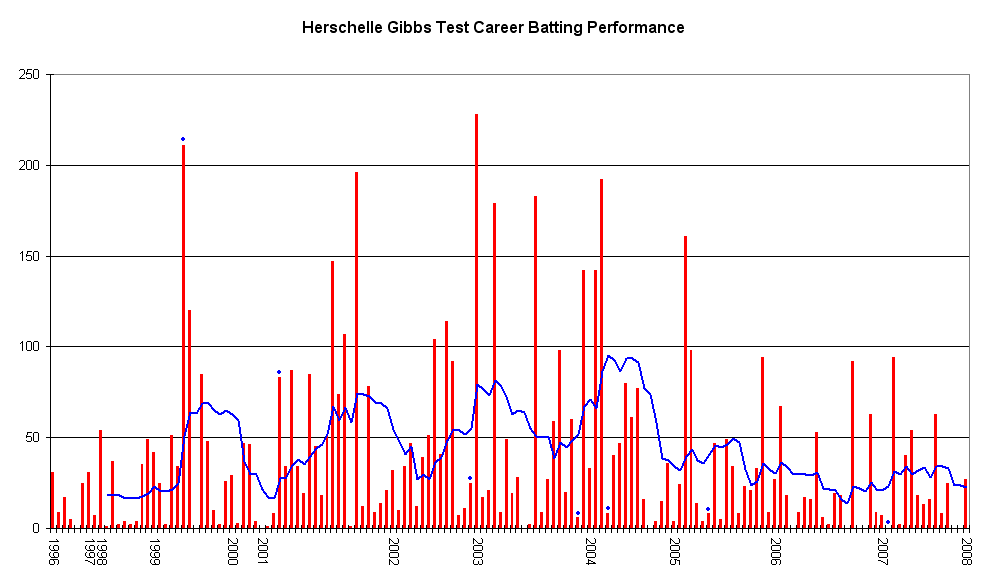
An innings-by-innings breakdown of Gibbs' Test match batting career, showing runs scored (red bars) and the average of the last ten innings (blue line).

== Domestic career ==
=== County cricket ===
Gibbs played for Glamorgan in the 2008 County Twenty20 tournament where he had a successful time; his highest score being 98 off just 52 balls in a losing game against Northants. He then signed up to play for Glamorgan for the 2009 County season, replacing Mark Cosgrove as the overseas player at the end of June. He also represented Glamorgan in two NatWest Pro40 League matches in that same season.

Gibbs then signed for Yorkshire Carnegie for the 2010 Friends Provident t20 tournament, where he was their overseas player, scoring 101 from 53 balls against Northamptonshire to achieve his first century in English T20 cricket.

=== Big Bash League ===
In the 2011/12 season the Perth Scorchers signed Gibbs for their campaign in the Australian Big Bash League. Gibbs did a brilliant job for the team so much so that they made it to the final. He was the third highest run scorer. He scored 302 runs in 7 matches with an average of 43.14. His prominent batting helped the Scorchers to participate in the Champions League T20 which was held in South Africa during September 2012.

=== Indian Premier League ===
In April 2008, Herschelle Gibbs joined the Deccan Chargers of the Indian Premier League. His mediocre performance in 2008 season made the Chargers' management put him on sale. However, he came up with splendid knocks in the second season helping the Deccan Chargers ahead with four continuous wins in their first four matches. Of all the openers, Adam Gilchrist and Gibbs have been the most explosive pair. He also played a crucial role in the finals by scoring an unbeaten 53 (48 balls) in the final when Adam Gilchrist went out for a duck. He also took a crucial catch off Mark Boucher at point when the Royal Challengers were cruising to the victory. In the 2012 version of the IPL, he was signed by the Mumbai Indians with a reported fee of US$50,000. His top score is 69* (56) v Chennai Super Kings. In 2012, he scored 66* (46) for the Mumbai Indians.

=== Bangladesh Premier League ===
In a new T20 championship in Bangladesh, the team of Khulna Royal Bengals in the Bangladesh Premier League bought him for $50000 as their team member on 19 January 2012.

=== Kashmir Premier League ===
In the inaugural edition Kashmir Premier League 2021, he was the only foreign player to join the tournament.

== Controversies ==
In 2001, Gibbs was fined along with several teammates for smoking marijuana during that year's tour of the West Indies.

Gibbs was involved in the match fixing affair with former captain Hansie Cronje, who offered him $15,000 to score "less than 20" in the 5th One-Day International of a series. He tearfully claimed to the King Commission of inquiry into corruption in South African cricket that he did not follow through on his side of the bargain, scoring 74 runs. As a result, he was banned for only six months. He repeatedly refused to tour India fearing arrest and refused to even speak to Indian Police over the matter. However, Gibbs was named in the South African squad to tour India in the 2006 ICC Champions Trophy, and as a result, met with Indian Police over his involvement in the match-fixing scandal.

On 15 January 2007, it was announced that Gibbs would face a disciplinary panel after making racist comments during the 1st Test against Pakistan. His words had been picked up on the stump microphone saying remarks such as "go back to the zoo" and swearing to the Pakistani players and as a result heard across the world. The comments were said to have been directed at the members of the crowd after teammate Paul Harris had been abused by them whilst fielding. The Pakistani management made an official complaint to referee Chris Broad, and Gibbs was banned for two Tests. He appealed against the ban, but this was rejected by the ICC's code of conduct commissioner, Richie Benaud. The ban was, however, changed to one Test, one Twenty20 game and one ODI match – all against Pakistan. In August 2021, he accused BCCI of putting pressure on him to not play in the inaugural edition of the Kashmir Premier League (KPL).

== Coaching career ==
In July 2019, Gibbs was appointed as the head coach of the Rotterdam Rhinos for the inaugural edition of the Euro T20 Slam cricket tournament. Prior to this, he also had an experience of coaching teams in Shpageeza Cricket League and Kuwait's national squad. In November 2020, he was selected by the Colombo Kings as the head coach for the inaugural edition of the Lanka Premier League. On 2 January 2021, he was selected as a new head coach of Karachi Kings in the PSL.

== See also ==
- List of international cricket centuries by Herschelle Gibbs
- List of cricketers banned for match fixing
