= 2008–09 Supersport Series =

Cricket season

- Cricket format: First-class
- Tournament format(s): Round robin
- Champions: Titans (3rd title)
- Participants: 6
- Matches: 30
- Most runs: Imraan Khan (Dolphins) (835)
- Most wickets: Claude Henderson (Cape Cobras) (39)

The 2008–09 Supersport Series was the 13th running of the Supersport Series, the premier first-class competition in South Africa, and seventh since the introduction of franchise teams. Matches were played over four days, with each team playing each other twice, home and away, in a round robin format. The series started on 2 October 2008 and was played through until 2 April 2009. Nashua Titans emerged as champions for a third Supersport Series title.

== Teams ==
- Nashua Cape Cobra in Cape Town
- Nashua Dolphins in Durban
- Gestetner Diamond Eagles in Bloemfontein
- bizhub Highveld Lions in Johannesburg
- Nashua Titans in Centurion, Gauteng
- Chevrolet Warriors in East London

== Stadiums ==
Stadium	City	Capacity	Home Team
Sahara Park Newlands	Cape Town	25 000	Nashua Cape Cobra
Boland Park	Paarl	10 000	Nashua Cape Cobra
Sahara Park Kingsmead	Durban	25 000	Nashua Dolphins
Pietermaritzburg Oval	Pietermaritzburg	12 000	Nashua Dolphins
OUTsurance Oval	Bloemfontein	20 000	Gestetner Diamond Eagles
De Beers Diamond Oval	Kimberley	11 000	Gestetner Diamond Eagles
Liberty Life Wanderers Stadium	Johannesburg	34 000	bizhub Highveld Lions
Senwes Park	Potchefstroom	9 000	bizhub Highveld Lions
Willowmoore Park	Benoni	20 000	Nashua Titans
Supersport Park	Centurion	20 000	Nashua Titans
Sahara Oval St George's	Port Elizabeth	19 000	Chevrolet Warriors
Buffalo Park	East London	15 000	Chevrolet Warriors

== Points table ==
2008/9 Supersport Series
Team	P	W	L	D	Pts
Nashua Titans	10	5	0	5	117.30
Gestetner Diamond Eagles	10	5	4	1	109.87
bizhub Highveld Lions	10	2	2	6	78.90
Chevrolet Warriors	9	2	3	4	75.74
Nashua Cape Cobra	9	1	3	5	66.02
Nashua Dolphins	10	0	3	7	56.88

Cricinfo

=== Explanation of points ===
Points will be allocated for each match in accordance with the system described below:

- For an outright win 10
- For a tie on a double innings 6
- First innings points Awarded only for batting and bowling performances in the first 100 overs of each first innings and retained irrespective of the match result
- Batting bonus points 1 point awarded on attaining 150 runs, and 0,02 of a point for each run scored thereafter.
- Bowling bonus points A maximum of 4 points to be awarded, one each at the fall of the 3rd., 5th., 7th. and 9th. wicket
- If play starts when less than 10 hours playing time remains, a one innings match will be played but no bonus points will be scored. The side winning on the one innings to score 6 points.

=== Table Notes ===
- P = Played
- W = Won
- L = Lost
- D = Drawn
- Bat = Batting Points
- Bowl = Bowling Points
- Pen = Penalty Points
- Match = Match Points
- Pts = Total Points

== Fixtures & Results ==
=== Round 1 ===
2–5 October 2008
Scorecard

Nashua Dolphins	v	Nashua Titans
292/10 (110 overs); Jon Kent 91 (171 balls); Quinton Friend 3/33 (17 overs)		211/10 (86 overs); Gulam Bodi 62 (141 balls); Ethy Mbhalati 3/26 (16 overs)

Match Drawn
Sahara Park Kingsmead, Durban
Umpires: Brian Jerling (South Africa) , Dennis Smith (South Africa)

- Toss: Dolphins, who chose to field first.
- Points: Dolphins 7.4, Titans 5.22
- Close of play:
- 2 Oct day 1 – Dolphins 1st innings 11/0 (I Khan 6*, R Gobind 3*, 8 ov)
- 3 Oct day 2 – Dolphins 1st innings 141/5 (JC Kent 34*, P de Bruyn 28*, 62 ov)
- 4 Oct day 3 – Dolphins 1st innings 292
- 5 Oct day 4 – Dolphins 1st innings 292 (110 ov) – end of match

2–5 October 2008
Scorecard

Gestetner Diamond Eagles	v	Nashua Cape Cobra
296/10 (117.4 overs); Ryan Bailey 91 (167 balls); CJ de Villiers 4/32 (9.5 overs)		125/10 (33.5 overs); Claude Henderson 29 not out (33 balls); Monde Zondeki 3/62 (25overs)
129/10 (50 overs); Riley Rossouw 63 not out (133 balls); Dillon du Preez 3/28 (14 overs)		214/10 (55.4 overs); Vernon Philander 42 (52 balls); Charl Langeveldt 3/24 (12 overs)

Eagles won by 86 runs
De Beers Diamond Oval, Kimberley
Umpires: Shaun George (SA) and Gerrie Pienaar (SA)
Player of the match: Ryan Bailey

- Cape Cobras won the toss and elected to field.
- Points: Eagles 16.42, Cape Cobras 3

2–5 October 2008
Scorecard

bizhub Highveld Lions	v	Chevrolet Warriors
255/10 (90 overs); Alviro Petersen 131 (224 balls); Craig Alexander 3/68 (16 overs)		316/10 (85 overs); Justin Kreusch 85 (140 balls); Robin Peterson 2/12 (9 overs)
311/10 (85.1 overs); Alviro Petersen 120 (163 balls); André Nel 4/51 (13.2 overs)		213/10 (58.2 overs); Justin Kreusch 49 (55 balls); Robin Peterson 5/60 (21 overs)

Lions won by 37 runs
Liberty Life Wanderers Stadium, Johannesburg
Umpires: Murray Brown (South Africa) , Marais Erasmus (South Africa)
Player of the match: Robin Peterson

- Toss: Lions, who chose to bat first.
- Points: Lions 17.1, Warriors 8.32
- Close of play:
- 2 Oct day 1 – Lions 1st innings 240/9 (CJ Alexander 1*, GJP Kruger 0*, 83.2 ov)
- 3 Oct day 2 – Warriors 1st innings 263/8 (JP Kreusch 39*, LL Tsotsobe 1*, 68.1 ov)
- 4 Oct day 3 – Lions 2nd innings 274/9 (A Nel 26*, GJP Kruger 1*, 74 ov)
- 5 Oct day 4 – Warriors 2nd innings 213 (58.2 ov) – end of match

=== Round 2 ===
9–12 October 2008

Nashua Dolphins	v	bizhub Highveld Lions
459/5 dec (136 overs); Ahmed Amla 164 not out (337 balls); Yusuf Abdullah 2/52 (19 overs)		379/7 dec (113 overs); Jonathan Vandiar 172 not out (225 balls); Craig Alexander 3/89 (20 overs)
266/5 dec (70 overs); Imraan Khan 103 (202 balls); Yusuf Abdullah 1/12 (6 overs)		121/2 (41 overs); Alviro Petersen 52 (95 balls); Stephen Cook 3/42 (10 overs)

Match Drawn
Sahara Park Kingsmead, Durban
Umpires: Murray Brown (South Africa) , SL Shastri (India)
Player of the match: Imraan Khan (Nashua Dolphins) & Jonathan Vandiar (bizhub Highveld Lions)

9–12 October 2008

Chevrolet Warriors	v	Gestetner Diamond Eagles
256/10 (97.1 overs); Arno Jacobs 77 (190 balls); Makhaya Ntini 5/9 (10.5 overs)		28/10 (24.5 overs); Ryan Bailey 10 (30 balls); Victor Mpitsang 4/36 (15.1 overs)
272/4 dec (79.5 overs); Zander de Bruyn 81 (125 balls); Juan Theron 7/46 (28.4 overs)		239/10 (105.4 overs); Riley Rossouw 66 (144 balls); Thandi Tshabalala 3/45 (11 overs)

Chevrolet Warriors won by 261 runs
Sahara Oval St George's, Port Elizabeth
Umpires: Earl Hendrikse (South Africa) , Brian Jerling (South Africa)
Player of the match: Makhaya Ntini (Chevrolet Warriors)

9–12 October 2008

Nashua Titans	v	Nashua Cape Cobra
413/10 (141.3 overs); Gulam Bodi 138 (262 balls); Pierre Joubert 3/57 (18 overs)		417/10 (99.2 overs); JP Duminy 124 (175 balls); Claude Henderson 5/105 (46.3 overs)
185/8 (57 overs); Faf du Plessis 55 (85 balls); Basheer Walters 2/66 (19 overs)		281/7 dec (84 overs); Ryan Canning 76 not out (87 balls); JP Duminy 3/41 (6 overs)

Match Drawn
Willowmoore Park, Benoni
Umpires: Gerrie Pienaar (South Africa) , Dennis Smith (South Africa)
Player of the match: JP Duminy (Nashua Cape Cobra)

=== Round 3 ===
16–19 October 2008

Nashua Cape Cobra	v	Nashua Dolphins
476/10 (161.4 overs); JP Duminy 138 (287 balls); Claude Henderson 5/126 (50.1 overs)		435/9 dec (160.1 overs); Jon Kent 110 (207 balls); Pierre de Bruyn 3/39 (12.4 overs)
did not bat 2nd innings did not bat 2nd innings Claude Henderson 3/33 (21 overs)		93/3 (43 overs); Imraan Khan 46 (129 balls)

Match Drawn
Sahara Park Newlands, Cape Town
Umpires: Shaun George (South Africa) , Brian Jerling (South Africa)
Player of the match: Claude Henderson (Nashua Cape Cobra)

16–19 October 2008

Chevrolet Warriors	v	Nashua Titans
119/10 (41.4 overs); Arno Jacobs 34 (71 balls); Makhaya Ntini 3/25 (16 overs)		190/10 (73.4 overs); AB de Villiers 52 (128 balls); Albie Morkel 6/47 (14.4 overs)
77/10 (23.1 overs); Robin Peterson 19 (20 balls); Lonwabo Tsotsobe 3/29 (17 overs)		202/10 (78.5 overs); Morné Morkel 82 not out (137 balls); Morné Morkel 5/9 (8 overs)

Nashua Titans won by 196 runs
Buffalo Park, East London
Umpires: Ian Howell (South Africa) , SL Shastri (India)
Player of the match: Morné Morkel (Nashua Titans)

16–19 October 2008

Gestetner Diamond Eagles	v	bizhub Highveld Lions
329/10 (110.1 overs); Boeta Dippenaar 93 (240 balls); Thandi Tshabalala 3/48 (16 overs)		171/10 (62.2 overs); Matthew Harris 35 (67 balls); Garnett Kruger 4/72 (29 overs)
158/10 (51.5 overs); Reeza Hendricks 33 (73 balls); Con de Lange 4/64 (25 overs)		239/10 (95 overs); Neil McKenzie 51 (113 balls); Cliffe Deacon 5/38 (12.5 overs)

Gestetner Diamond Eagles won by 77 runs
OUTsurance Oval, Bloemfontein
Umpires: Johanes Cloete (South Africa) , Dennis Smith (South Africa)
Player of the match: Thandi Tshabalala (Gestetner Diamond Eagles)

=== Round 4 ===
30 October – 2 November 2008

Nashua Cape Cobra	v	bizhub Highveld Lions
348/10 (128.1 overs); Stiaan van Zyl71 (129 balls); Alistair Gray4/47 (16 overs)		395/10 (134.5 overs); Stephen Cook 132 (356 balls); Jean Symes 3/56 (22.1 overs)
235/4 dec (74 overs); Andrew Puttick 74 (178 balls); Charl Langeveldt 2/25 (9 overs)		107/4 dec (34 overs); Vaughn van Jaarsveld 38 (42 balls); Etienne Gerber 1/27 (14 overs)

Match Drawn
Boland Park, Paarl
Umpires: Johanes Cloete (South Africa) , Shaun George (South Africa)
Player of the match: Stiaan van Zyl (Nashua Cape Cobra)

30 October – 2 November 2008

Nashua Titans	v	Gestetner Diamond Eagles
423/9 dec (143.1 overs); Farhaan Behardien150 not out (272 balls); Paul Harris 5/86 (35 overs)		254/10 (83.4 overs); Rilee Rossouw 106 (160 balls); Thandi Tshabalala 3/68 (20 overs)
214/5 dec (50 overs); Blake Snijman 52 (72 balls); Paul Harris 7/94 (43 overs)		244/10 (95.2 overs); Dean Elgar 155 (276 balls); Con de Lange 3/73 (18 overs)

Nashua Titans won by 139 runs
Willowmoore Park, Benoni
Umpires: Karl Hunter (South Africa) , Dennis Smith (South Africa)
Player of the match: Paul Harris (Nashua Titans)

30 October – 2 November 2008

Nashua Dolphins	v	Chevrolet Warriors
277/10 (88.5 overs); Ahmed Amla97 (203 balls); Quinton Friend 3/84 (26.3 overs)		375/10 (114.3 overs); Davy Jacobs 74 (99 balls); Makhaya Ntini 6/85 (26.5 overs)
168/7 (64.3 overs); Daryn Smit 68 not out (118 balls); Ugasen Govender 4/63 (14 overs)		175/8 dec (48 overs); Zander de Bruyn56 (94 balls); Makhaya Ntini 3/24 (16 overs)

Match Drawn
Sahara Park Kingsmead, Durban
Umpires: Murray Brown (South Africa) , Zed Ndamane (South Africa)
Player of the match: Makhaya Ntini (Chevrolet Warriors)

=== Round 5 ===
6–9 November 2008

Nashua Dolphins	v	Gestetner Diamond Eagles
275/10 (86.1 overs); Ahmed Amla 72 (103 balls); Dillon du Preez 3/71 (24 overs)		420/10 (159.3 overs); Ryan Bailey 150 (338 balls); Ugasen Govender 3/66 (40.3 overs)
8/1 (4.2 overs); Imraan Khan 8 not out (15 balls); CJ de Villiers 1/5 (2 overs)		26/5 dec (14 overs); Boeta Dippenaar 12 not out (39 balls); Ugasen Govender 2/11 (7 overs)

Match Drawn
Sahara Park Kingsmead, Durban
Umpires: Johanes Cloete (South Africa) , Karl Hurter (South Africa)
Player of the match: Ugasen Govender (Nashua Dolphins)

6–9 November 2008

Nashua Titans	v	bizhub Highveld Lions
417/10 (114.5 overs); Francois du Plessis 176 (243 balls); Craig Alexander 5/110 (22.1 overs)		382/6 (106 overs); Werner Coetsee 116 not out (159 balls); Paul Harris 2/108 (30 overs)

Match Drawn
Supersport Park, Centurion, Gauteng
Umpires: Murray Brown (South Africa) , Shaun George (South Africa)
Player of the match: Francois du Plessis (Nashua Titans)

6–9 November 2008

Nashua Cape Cobra	v	Chevrolet Warriors
340/10 (135 overs); Andrew Puttick 105 (206 balls); Juan Theron 5/51 (23 overs)		263/10 (97.3 overs); Arno Jacobs 92 (218 balls); Francois Plaatjies 4/59 (20 overs)
190/7 dec (68 overs); Andrew Puttick 40 (74 balls); Makhaya Ntini 2/50 (18 overs)		206/8 (80 overs); Ashwell Prince 72 not out (177 balls); Claude Henderson 3/49 (30 overs)

Match Drawn
Boland Park, Paarl
Umpires: Gerrie Pienaar (South Africa) , Brad White (South Africa)
Player of the match: Ashwell Prince (Chevrolet Warriors)

=== Round 6 ===
26 Feb – 1 Mar 2009
Scorecard

Nashua Cape Cobra	v	Gestetner Diamond Eagles
285/10 (84.3 overs); Alistair Gray 110 (225 balls); Rory Kleinveldt 7/43 (25 overs)		256/10 (97.4 overs); Rilee Rossouw 111 (226 balls); Charl Pietersen 4/64 (15 overs)
246/10 (66.2 overs); Stiaan van Zyl 85 (113 balls); Stiaan van Zyl 3/24 (14 overs)		355/7 dec (120.3 overs); Reeza Hendricks 151* (364 balls); Charl Pietersen 4/36 (15 overs)

Eagles won by 80 runs
Sahara Park Newlands, Cape Town
Umpires: Ian Howell (South Africa) , Brad White (South Africa)
Player of the match: Reeza Hendricks (Eagles)

- Toss: Cape Cobras, who chose to field first.
- Points: Eagles 17.12, Cape Cobras 7.7
- Close of play:
- 26 Feb day 1 – Cape Cobras 1st innings 17/0 (AG Puttick 10*, S van Zyl 7*, 4 ov)
- 27 Feb day 2 – Eagles 2nd innings 43/1 (RR Hendricks 16*, RR Rossouw 24*, 13 ov)
- 28 Feb day 3 – Eagles 2nd innings 320/6 (RR Hendricks 137*, AJ Pienaar 60*, 114 ov)
- 1 Mar day 4 – Cape Cobras 2nd innings 246 (66.2 ov) – end of match

26 Feb – 1 Mar 2009
Scorecard

Chevrolet Warriors	v	bizhub Highveld Lions
219/10 (69.5 overs); Arno Jacobs 64* (155 balls); Lyall Meyer 3/42 (22.1 overs)		349/10 (134.1 overs); Vaughn van Jaarsveld 110 (197 balls); Friedel de Wet 4/30 (18 overs)
296/10 (111.2 overs); Ashwell Prince 77 (177 balls); Johan Botha 3/26 (6 overs)		148/6 (32 overs); Jean Symes 65 (92 balls); Robert Frylinck 4/48 (22.2 overs)

Match drawn
Sahara Oval St George's, Port Elizabeth
Umpires: Karl Hurter (South Africa) , Derek Walker (New Zealand)
Player of the match: Dane Vilas (Lions)

- Toss: Warriors, who chose to bat first.
- Points: Lions 8.12, Warriors 5.38
- Close of play:
- 26 Feb day 1 – Lions 1st innings 61/1 (AN Petersen 26*, SC Cook 7*, 24 ov)
- 27 Feb day 2 – Lions 1st innings 277/8 (AM Phangiso 5*, F de Wet 1*, 109 ov)
- 28 Feb day 3 – Warriors 2nd innings 176/3 (A Jacobs 65*, AG Prince 56*, 56 ov)
- 1 Mar day 4 – Lions 2nd innings 148/6 (32 ov) – end of match

26 February – 1 March 2009
Scorecard

Nashua Titans	v	Nashua Dolphins
276/10 (98.4 overs); Gulam Bodi 64 (183 balls); Imran Tahir 5/65 (17.5 overs)		228/10 (54.5 overs); Ahmed Amla 88 (82 balls); Daryn Smit 3/45 (17.4 overs)
272/6 dec (67 overs); Blake Snijman 114 (160 balls); Albie Morkel 5/25 (10.2 overs)		100/10 (37.2 overs); Cameron Delport 40 (68 balls); Ugasen Govender 3/50 (15 overs)

Titans won by 220 runs
Willowmoore Park, Benoni
Umpires: Shaun George (South Africa) , Gerrie Pienaar (South Africa)
Player of the match: Blake Snijman (Titans)

- Toss: Titans, who chose to bat first.
- Points: Titans 17.52, Dolphins 6.56
- Close of play:
- 26 Feb day 1 – Titans 1st innings 95/3 (GH Bodi 46*, F du Plessis 1*, 45 ov)
- 27 Feb day 2 – Dolphins 1st innings 188/6 (M Bekker 4*, 41.3 ov)
- 28 Feb day 3 – Titans 2nd innings 272/6 (PJ Malan 66*, P Joubert 3*, 67 ov)
- 1 Mar day 4 – Dolphins 2nd innings 100 (37.2 ov) – end of match

=== Round 7 ===
5–7 March 2009
Scorecard

Nashua Cape Cobra	v	Nashua Titans
228/10 (88.4 overs); Ryan Canning 122 (192 balls); Vernon Philander 5/60 (31 overs)		360/10 (142.3 overs); Gulam Bodi 63 (103 balls); Pierre Joubert 7/38 (18.4 overs)
91/10 (52.4 overs); Stiaan van Zyl 37 (144 balls) did not bowl		did not bat did not bat Pierre Joubert 3/16 (12 overs)

Titans won by an innings and 41 runs
Boland Park, Paarl

- Toss: Cape Cobras, who chose to bat first.
- Points: Titans 17.5, Cape Cobras 4.56
- Close of play:
- 5 Mar day 1 – Titans 1st innings 10/1 (BD Snijman 5*, 7.5 ov)
- 6 Mar day 2 – Titans 1st innings 278/6 (P Joubert 8*, RE van der Merwe 13*, 104 ov)
- 7 Mar day 3 – Cape Cobras 2nd innings 91 (52.4 ov) – end of match

5–8 March 2009

Gestetner Diamond Eagles	v	Chevrolet Warriors

Eagles won by 3 wickets
OUTsurance Oval, Bloemfontein

5–8 March 2009

bizhub Highveld Lions	v	Nashua Dolphins

Match drawn
Senwes Park, Potchefstroom

=== Round 8 ===
12–15 March 2009

Nashua Dolphins	v	Nashua Cape Cobra

Match drawn
Pietermaritzburg Oval, Pietermaritzburg

12–15 March 2009

bizhub Highveld Lions	v	Gestetner Diamond Eagles

Lions won by 9 wickets
Liberty Life Wanderers Stadium, Johannesburg

12–15 March 2009

Nashua Titans	v	Chevrolet Warriors

Match drawn
Supersport Park, Centurion, Gauteng

=== Round 9 ===
26–29 March 2009

bizhub Highveld Lions	v	Nashua Cape Cobra

Senwes Park, Potchefstroom

26–29 March 2009

Chevrolet Warriors	v	Nashua Dolphins

Sahara Oval St George's, Port Elizabeth

26–29 March 2009

Gestetner Diamond Eagles	v	Nashua Titans

OUTsurance Oval, Bloemfontein

=== Round 10 ===
2–5 April 2009

Chevrolet Warriors	v	Nashua Cape Cobra

Buffalo Park, East London

2–5 April 2009

Gestetner Diamond Eagles	v	Nashua Dolphins

De Beers Diamond Oval, Kimberley

2–5 April 2009

bizhub Highveld Lions	v	Nashua Titans

Liberty Life Wanderers Stadium, Johannesburg

== See also ==
- Supersport Series
