= 2008–09 MTN Domestic Championship =

- Official logo of the MTN Domestic Championship
- Dates: 14 October 2008 – 17 January 2009
- Administrator(s): Cricket South Africa
- Cricket format: List A
- Tournament format(s): Double round-robin and playoffs
- Champions: Titans
- Participants: 6
- Most runs: Vaughn van Jaarsveld (Lions) 487
- Most wickets: Roelof van der Merwe (Titans) 24

The MTN Domestic Championship is the premier List A cricket championship in South Africa. This was the 28th time the championship was contested. Each team plays each other twice in a home and away leg. The top four teams progress to the semi-finals, with the winners of the semi-finals going through to the final.

The series starts on 14 October 2008 and plays through until the final on 17 January 2009.

== Teams ==
- Cape Cobras in Cape Town & Paarl
- Dolphins in Durban & Pietermaritzburg
- Diamond Eagles in Bloemfontein & Kimberley
- Highveld Lions in Johannesburg and Potchefstroom
- Titans in Centurion & Benoni
- Warriors in East London & Port Elizabeth

== Stadiums ==
Stadium	City	Capacity	Home Team
Sahara Park Newlands	Cape Town	25 000	Cape Cobras
Boland Park	Paarl	10 000	Cape Cobras
Sahara Stadium Kingsmead	Durban	25 000	Dolphins
Pietermaritzburg Oval	Pietermaritzburg	12 000	Dolphins
OUTsurance Oval	Bloemfontein	20 000	Diamond Eagles
De Beers Diamond Oval	Kimberley	11 000	Diamond Eagles
Liberty Life Wanderers Stadium	Johannesburg	34 000	Highveld Lions
Senwes Park	Potchefstroom	9 000	Highveld Lions
Willowmoore Park	Benoni	20 000	Titans
Supersport Park	Centurion	20 000	Titans
Sahara Oval St George's	Port Elizabeth	19 000	Warriors
Buffalo Park	East London	15 000	Warriors

== Points table ==
2008/9 MTN Domestic Championship
Pos	Team	Pld	W	L	T	NR	BP	Pts	NRR	For	Against
1	Diamond Eagles	10	7	2	0	1	4	34	0.842	2082/344.3	1897/364.4
2	Titans	10	6	2	0	2	1	29	0.069	1688/318.1	1791/342
3	Cape Cobras	10	5	3	0	2	2	26	0.247	1588/338.3	1488/334.5
4	Dolphins	10	4	4	0	2	1	21	−0.341	1713/359.2	1771/346.4
5	Warriors	10	2	7	0	1	1	11	−0.311	1763/373.1	1823/362
6	Highveld Lions	10	2	8	0	0	1	9	−0.362	2162/425.1	2226/408.4

=== Point system ===
- Win: 4 points
- Tie, no result or abandoned: 2 points
- Loss: 0 points
- Bonus points: 1 point awarded if the run rate is sufficiently higher than that of the opposition.

== Fixtures & Results ==
=== November 2008 ===
14 November 2008
Report

Diamond Eagles; 334/4 (45 overs)	v	Titans; 336/3 (40.4 overs)
Boeta Dippenaar 71 not out (45 balls); Thandi Tshabalala 1/41 (4 overs)		Martin van Jaarsveld 132 not out (96 balls); Roelof van der Merwe 2/75 (9 overs)

Titans win by 7 wickets
OUTsurance Oval, Bloemfontein
Umpires: M Erasmus & BG Jerling
Player of the match: Martin van Jaarsveld, (Titans)

14 November 2008
Report

Highveld Lions; 344/5 (45 overs)	v	Dolphins; 228/10 (38.4 overs)
Jean Symes 146 (138 balls); Cliff Deacon 5/38 (7.4 overs)		Grant Rowley 46 (43 balls); Sanath Jayasuriya 2/52 (6 overs)

Highveld Lions win by 116 runs
Senwes Park, Potchefstroom
Umpires: S George & RE Koertzen
Player of the match: Jean Symes, (Highveld Lions)

16 November 2008
Report

Titans; 89/3 (16.2 overs)	v	Warriors; 127/10 (33.5 overs)
Arno Jacobs 31 (38 balls); Johan Botha 1/17 (5 overs)		Gulam Bodi 35 (25 balls); Roelof van der Merwe 4/28 (6.5 overs)

Titans won by 7 wickets (D/L method)
Supersport Park, Centurion, Gauteng
Umpires: MW Brown & RE Koertzen
Player of the match: Roelof van der Merwe, (Titans)

19 November 2008
Report

Dolphins; 137/9 (45 overs)	v	Diamond Eagles; 138/5 (34 overs)
Ahmed Amla 34 not out (65 balls); Yusuf Abdullah 3/43 (9 overs)		Loots Bosman 35 (32 balls); Victor Mpitsang 3/18 (9 overs)

Eagles won by 5 wickets
Sahara Park Kingsmead, Durban
Umpires: JD Cloete & GH Pienaar
Player of the match: Ryan McLaren, (Diamond Eagles)

21 November 2008
Report

Warriors; 264/8 (45 overs)	v	Diamond Eagles; 358/5 (45 overs)
Johan Botha 54 not out (44 balls); Johan Botha 1/59 (7 overs)		Rilee Rossouw 131 (108 balls); Dillon du Preez 3/31 (7 overs)

Eagles win by 94 runs
Buffalo Park, East London
Umpires: IL Howell & GH Pienaar
Player of the match: Rilee Rossouw, (Diamond Eagles)

21 November 2008
Report

Highveld Lions; 229/10 (44 overs)	v	Titans; 230/7 (41.4 overs)
Vaughn van Jaarsveld 70 not out (80 balls); Cliff Deacon 2/53 (9 overs)		Blake Snijman 84 (96 balls); Basheeru-Deen Walters 3/35 (8 overs)

Titans win by 3 wickets
Liberty Life Wanderers Stadium, Johannesburg
Umpires: EC Hendrikse & KH Hurter
Player of the match: Blake Snijman, (Titans)

23 November 2008
Report

Diamond Eagles; 175/4 (32.3 overs)	v	Highveld Lions; 174/10 (44.3 overs)
Rilee Rossouw 54 (61 balls); Richard Cameron 1/6 (3 overs)		Stephen Cook 51 (68 balls); Victor Mpitsang 2/23 (9 overs)

Eagles win by 6 wickets
De Beers Diamond Oval, Kimberley
Umpires: S George & IL Howell
Player of the match: Rilee Rossouw, (Diamond Eagles)

23 November 2008
Report

Titans; 107/10 (27.1 overs)	v	Cape Cobra; 208/10 (44.1 overs)
Gulam Bodi 34 (59 balls); Claude Henderson 4/25 (6 overs)		Jean-Paul Duminy 59 (73 balls); Martin van Jaarsveld 3/13 (4.1 overs)

Cape Cobra win by 101 runs
Supersport Park, Centurion, Gauteng
Umpires: ZTA Ndamane & DJ Smith
Player of the match: Claude Henderson, (Cape Cobra)

26 November 2008
Report

Titans; 191/7 (43.4 overs)	v	Dolphins; 187/8 (45 overs)
Gulam Bodi 65 (88 balls); Roelof van der Merwe 3/30 (9 overs)		Daryn Smit 52 (66 balls); Daryn Smit 2/23 (5 overs)

Titans win by 3 wickets
Willowmoore Park, Benoni
Umpires: KH Hunter & MB White
Player of the match: Gulam Bodi, (Titans)

28 November 2008
Report

Diamond Eagles; 203/8 (44 overs)	v	Cape Cobra; 57/0 (12.4 overs)
Boeta Dippenaar 63 (88 balls)		Herschelle Gibbs 32 (39 balls); Claude Henderson 3/52 (9 overs)

No Result
OUTsurance Oval, Bloemfontein
Umpires: GH Pienaar & DJ Smith

30 November 2008
Report

Highveld Lions; 161/10 (35.5 overs)	v	Warriors; 244/10 (44.5 overs)
Jean Symes 53 (60 balls); Richard Cameron 2/37 (7 overs)		Justin Kreusch 38 (39 balls); Robin Peterson 5/11 (7.5 overs)

Warriors win by 83 runs
Liberty Life Wanderers Stadium, Johannesburg
Umpires: MW Brown & KH Hunter
Player of the match: Robin Peterson, (Warriors)

=== December 2008 ===
5 December 2008
Report

Warriors; 196/10 (42 overs)	v	Cape Cobra; 220/8 (45 overs)
Robin Peterson 55 (52 balls); Robin Peterson 3/37 (9 overs)		Ryan Canning 54 not out (48 balls); Claude Henderson 2/23 (9 overs)

Cape Cobras won by 24 runs
Buffalo Park, East London
Umpires: IH Howell & DJ Smith
Player of the match: Ryan Canning (Warriors)

5 December 2008
Report

Highveld Lions; 215/6 (32 overs)	v	Diamond Eagles; 223/6 (32 overs)
Vaughn van Jaarsveld 97 (79 balls); Werner Coetsee 3/33 (6 overs)		Morne van Wyk 56 (63 balls); Thandi Tshabalala 2/34 (5 overs)

Eagles win by 9 runs
Liberty Life Wanderers Stadium, Johannesburg
Umpires: MW Brown & KH Hunter
Player of the match: Vaughn van Jaarsveld (Highveld Lions)

12 December 2008
Report

Diamond Eagles; 229/7 (43 overs)	v	Warriors; 227/3 (43 overs)
Morne van Wyk 88 (144 balls); Con de Lange 1/24 (7 overs)		JJ Smuts 104 not out (122 balls); Wayne Parnell 2/48 (9 overs)

Warriors won by 4 runs (D/L method)
De Beers Diamond Oval, Kimberley
Umpires: JD Cloete & KH Hunter
Player of the match: JJ Smuts (Warriors)

12 December 2008
Report

Titans; 257/6 (45 overs)	v	Highveld Lions; 256/8 (45 overs)
Gulam Bodi 115 (111 balls); Pierre Joubert 3/44 (9 overs)		Vaughn van Jaarsveld 68 (57 balls); Craig Alexander 2/59 (9 overs)

Titans won by 4 wickets
Supersport Park, Centurion, Gauteng
Umpires: S George & EC Hendrikse
Player of the match: Gulam Bodi (Titans)

14 December 2008
Report

Cape Cobra; 179/10 (42.4 overs)	v	Dolphins; 232/7 (45 overs)
Ryan Canning 49 (52 balls); Charl Langeveldt 3/34 (9 overs)		Imraan Khan 91 (109 balls); Jon Kent 3/30 (9 overs)

Dolphins won by 53 runs
Sahara Park Newlands, Cape Town
Umpires: M Erasmus & ZTA Ndamane
Player of the match: Jon Kent (Dolphins)

16 December 2008
Report

Diamond Eagles; 267/5 (45 overs)	v	Dolphins; 268/4 (44 overs)
Morne van Wyk 126 (124 balls); Ryan McLaren & Con de Lange 2/45 (9 overs)		Imraan Khan 110 not out (126 balls); Yusuf Abdullah 1/36 (9 overs)

Eagles won by 6 wickets
De Beers Diamond Oval, Kimberley
Umpires: KH Hunter & ZTA Ndamane
Player of the match: Morne van Wyk (Diamond Eagles)

16 December 2008
Report

Highveld Lions; 247/10 (43.5 overs)	v	Cape Cobra; 295/8 (45 overs)
Vaughn van Jaarsveld 84 ( 73 balls); Werner Coetsee 2/41 (9 overs)		Henry Davids 97 (101 balls); Rory Kleinveldt 3/26 (9 overs)

Cape Cobras won by 48 runs
Senwes Park, Potchefstroom
Umpires: S George & BG Jerling
Player of the match: Henry Davids (Cape Cobra)

19 December 2008
Report

Dolphins; 250/7 (45 overs)	v	Warriors; 241/9 (45 overs)
Imraan Khan 86 (118 balls); Sanath Jayasuriya 9/39 (9 overs)		Davey Jacobs 73 (71 balls); Wayne Parnell 4/56 (9 overs)

Dolphins won by 9 runs
Sahara Park Kingsmead, Durban
Umpires: M Erasmus & AT Holdstock
Player of the match: Imraan Khan (Dolphins)

19 December 2008
Report

Titans; 232/9 (45 overs)	v	Diamond Eagles; 244/6 (45 overs)
Blake Snijman 73 (91 balls); Roelof van der Merwe 4/45 (9 overs)		Ryan Bailey 93 not out (93 balls); Thandi Tshabalala 3/38 (9 overs)

Eagles won by 12 runs
Supersport Park, Centurion, Gauteng
Umpires: KH Hurter & DJ Smith
Player of the match: Ryan Bailey (Diamond Eagles)

21 December 2008
Report

Cape Cobra; 245/8 (45 overs)	v	Titans; 246/5 (40.5 overs)
Stiaan van Zyl 108 (130 balls); Francois Plaatjies 2/49 (6.5 overs)		Farhaan Behardien 67 not out(63 balls); Roelof van der Merwe 4/59 (9 overs)

Titans won by 5 wickets
Sahara Park Newlands, Cape Town
Umpires: BG Jerling & GH Pienaar
Player of the match: Roelof van der Merwe (Titans)

21 December 2008
Report

Dolphins; 230/5 (44.2 overs)	v	Highveld Lions; 229/10 (44.2 overs)
Imraan Khan 74 (82 balls); Quinton Friend 4/38 (6.2 overs)		Vaughn van Jaarsveld 52 (58 balls); Craig Alexander 2/49 (9 overs)

Dolphins won by 5 wickets
Pietermaritzburg Oval, Pietermaritzburg
Umpires: M Erasmus & LJ Willemse
Player of the match: Imraan Khan (Dolphins)

26 December 2008
Report

Warriors; 184/10 (44.2 overs)	v	Highveld Lions; 146/5 (33.1 overs)
Zander de Bruyn 27 (37 balls); Wayne Parnell 2/21 (5 overs)		Alviro Petersen 52 not out (87 balls); Jean Symes 3/33 (8 overs)

Highveld Lions won by 17 runs (D/L method)
Sahara Oval St George's, Port Elizabeth
Umpires: MW Brown & EC Hendrikse
Player of the match: Jean Symes (Highveld Lions)

26 December 2008
Report

Dolphins; 103/3 (24.5 overs)	v	Cape Cobra; Rain stopped play
Ahmed Amla 52 not out (72 balls); Rain stopped play		Rain stopped play Charl Langeveldt 1/11 (5 overs)

No Result (Rain stopped play)
Sahara Park Kingsmead, Durban
Umpires: IL Howell & ZTA Ndamane

28 December 2008
Report

Cape Cobra; 39/10 (15.2 overs)	v	Diamond Eagles; 99/2 (32 overs)
Richard Levi 14 (13 balls); Charl Langeveldt 1/16 (4.3 overs)		Morne van Wyk 34 not out (89 balls); Dillon du Preez 2/4 (3 overs)

Eagles won by 73 runs (D/L method)
Boland Park, Paarl
Umpires: BG Jerling & DJ Smith
Player of the match: Dillon du Preez (Diamond Eagles)

28 December 2008
Report

Warriors; Did not bat	v	Titans; 74/2 (10.5 overs)
Did not bat Wayne Parnell 1/18 (3 overs)		Blake Snijman 32 not out (24 balls); Did not bowl

No Result (Rain stopped play)
Buffalo Park, East London
Umpires: GH Pienaar & BM White

=== January 2009 ===
2 January 2009
Report

Cape Cobra; 188/5 (44.3 overs)	v	Warriors; 187/9 (45 overs)
Henry Davids 85 not out (117 balls); Charl Langeveldt 2/34 (9 overs)		Justin Kreusch 55 (93 balls); Justin Kreusch 2/26 (7 overs)

Cape Cobras won by 5 wickets
Sahara Park Newlands, Cape Town
Umpires: JD Cloete & GH Pienaar
Player of the match: Henry Davids (Cape Cobra)

2 January 2009
Report

Dolphins; 97/4 (16.2 overs)	v	Titans; 153/5 (33 overs)
Sanath Jayasuriya 58 (36 balls); Sanath Jayasuriya 2/26 (8 overs)		Francois du Plessis 47 not out (45 balls); Pierre Joubert 2/21 (5 overs)

No result (Rain stopped play)
Sahara Park Kingsmead, Durban
Umpires: MW Brown & EC Hendrikse

4 January 2009
Report

Cape Cobra; 214/6 (45 overs)	v	Highveld Lions; 161/10 (38.1 overs)
Henry Davids 116 (140 balls); Francois Plaatjies 3/21 (7 overs)		André Nel 58 (45 balls); Werner Coetsee 2/35 (9 overs)

Cape Cobras won by 53 runs
Boland Park, Paarl
Umpires: JD Cloete & M Erasmus
Player of the match: Henry Davids (Cape Cobra)

4 January 2009
Report

Warriors; 181/9 (45 overs)	v	Dolphins; 182/7 (45 overs)
Johan Botha 47 (81 balls); Juan Theron 3/25 (9 overs)		Jon Kent 86 (119 balls); Quinton Friend 3/39 (8 overs)

Dolphins won by 3 wickets
Sahara Oval St George's, Port Elizabeth
Umpires: IL Howell & BG Jerling
Player of the match: Jon Kent (Dolphins)

== Knock Out Stages ==
=== Semi-finals ===
9 January 2009
Report

Titans; 186/1 (26 overs)	v	Cape Cobras; 183/9 (33 overs)
Gulam Bodi 84 (90 balls); Roelof van der Merwe 5/31 (7 overs)		Henry Davids 49 (68 balls); Rory Kleinveldt 1/34 (5 overs)

Titans won by 9 wickets
Supersport Park, Centurion
Umpires: S George & IH Howell
Player of the match: Roelof van der Merwe (Titans)

11 January 2009
Report

Diamond Eagles; 253/8 (45 overs)	v	Dolphins; 245/7 (45 overs)
Loots Bosman 95 (89 balls); Victor Mpitsang 2/47 (9 overs)		Daryn Smit 55 not out (35 balls); Daryn Smit 3/13 (3 overs)

Eagles won by 8 runs
OUTsurance Oval, Bloemfontein
Umpires: MW Brown & M Erasmus
Player of the match: Loots Bosman (Diamond Eagles)

=== Final ===
16 January 2009
Report

Diamond Eagles; 138/10 (44 overs)	v	Titans; 141/2 (25.3 overs)
Riley Rossouw 39 (59 balls); Con de Lange 1/12 (3 overs)		Goolam Bodi 69 (65 balls); Paul Harris 5/27 (9 overs)

Titans won by 8 wickets
OUTsurance Oval, Bloemfontein
Umpires: BG Jerling & RE Koertzen
Player of the match: Paul Harris (Titans)

== See also ==
- MTN Domestic Championship
- MTN

== External sources ==
- Series home at ESPN Cricinfo
- CricketArchive
