= 2011 Standard Bank Pro20 =

2010–11 Standard Bank Pro20
- Administrator: Cricket South Africa
- Cricket format: Twenty20
- Tournament format(s): Round-robin and knockout
- Host: South Africa
- Champions: Cape Cobras (2nd title)
- Participants: 6
- Matches: 20
- Most runs: Owais Shah (Cape Cobras) (293)
- Most wickets: Makhaya Ntini (Warriors) (11)

The 2010–11 Standard Bank Pro20 was the eighth season of the Standard Bank Pro20 Series, established by the Cricket South Africa and the eighth season of the CSA T20 Challenge overall. The series was played between 28 January – 13 March 2011.

== Venues ==
Map of the venues for the 2010–11 Standard Bank Pro20

Stadium	City	Capacity	Home team
Newlands	Cape Town	25,000	Cape Cobras
Kingsmead	Durban	25,000	Dolphins
OUTsurance Oval	Bloemfontein	20,000	Knights
De Beers Diamond Oval	Kimberley	11,000	Knights
New Wanderers Stadium	Johannesburg	34,000	Lions
Senwes Park	Potchefstroom	9,000	Lions
SuperSport Park	Centurion	20,000	Titans
St George's Park	Port Elizabeth	19,000	Warriors
Buffalo Park	East London	15,000	Warriors

== Rules and regulations ==
The tournament is divided into a group stage and a knockout stage. In the group stage, teams face each other in a single round-robin tournament. At the end of the group stage, the top four teams qualify for the semi-finals. The semi-finals are best-of-three playoffs, with the top seed facing the fourth seed and the second seed facing the third seed. If a match in the knockout stage ends with a tie, a Super Over will determine the winner. The winners of the semi-finals play a single final match to determine the winner of the tournament.

For each group stage match, the host of the match alternates between tournaments. Each team hosts either two or three of their five matches. In the knockout stage, the higher seed hosts the second and third (if required) matches while the lower seed hosts the first match.

Points were awarded as follows in the group stage:

Point system
Result	Points
Win, with bonus point	5 points
Win, without bonus point	4 points
Tie	3 points
No result	2 points
Loss	0 points

- The team that achieves a run rate of 1.25 times that of the opposition shall be rewarded one bonus point.
- A team's run rate will be calculated by reference to the runs scored in an innings divided by the number of overs faced.
- Points are deducted for slow over rate at 1 point per over not completed within the allotted 90 minutes.

== Teams and standings ==
Pos	Team	Pld	W	L	NR	BP	Ded	Pts	NRR
1	Dolphins	5	4	1	0	0	0	16	−0.110
2	Titans	5	3	2	0	1	0	13	0.640
3	Cape Cobras	5	3	2	0	0	0	12	0.135
4	Warriors	5	3	2	0	0	0	12	−0.073
5	Lions	5	1	3	1	0	1	5	−0.107
6	Knights	5	0	4	1	0	0	2	−0.698

(C) = Eventual champion; (R) = Runner-up.
Note: The winner and runner-up qualified for the 2011 Champions League Twenty20.

== Results ==
=== Group stage ===
Visitor team →	Cape Cobras	Dolphins	Knights	Lions	Titans	Warriors
Home team ↓	Cape Cobras	Dolphins	Knights	Lions	Titans	Warriors
Cape Cobras					Cape Cobras; 5 wickets	Cape Cobras; 7 wickets
Dolphins	Dolphins; 9 runs			Dolphins; 3 wickets		
Knights	Cape Cobras; 13 runs (D/L)	Dolphins; 6 runs (D/L)				Warriors; 6 runs
Lions	Lions; 4 wickets		Abandoned; No result		Titans; 1 wicket	
Titans		Titans; 7 wickets	Titans; 5 wickets			
Warriors		Dolphins; 11 runs		Warriors; 6 runs	Warriors; 2 wickets	

Note: Click on the results to see match summary.

Home team won	Visitor team won	Match abandoned

=== Knockout stage ===
Semi-finals
1	Dolphins	0
4	Warriors	2
2	Titans	0
3	Cape Cobras	2

Final
4	Warriors	154/6 (20 ov)
3	Cape Cobras	166/5 (20 ov)

== Fixtures ==
All times shown are in South African Standard Time (UTC+02).

=== Group stage ===
28 January
18:00 (D/N)
Scorecard

Titans; 175/4 (20 overs)	v	Cape Cobras; 177/5 (20 overs)
Roelof van der Merwe 65 (40); Justin Ontong 2/26 (3 overs)		Richard Levi 68 (45); Pierre Joubert 2/29 (4 overs)

Cape Cobras won by 5 wickets
Newlands, Cape Town
Umpires: Johanes Cloete and Ian Howell
Player of the match: Richard Levi (batsman), Justin Kemp (bowler) (Cape Cobras)

- Titans won the toss and elected to bat.

30 January
14:30
Scorecard

Cape Cobras; 155/6 (20 overs)	v	Lions; 159/6 (20 overs)
Justin Ontong 56 (30); Ethan O'Reilly 1/22 (4 overs)		Zander de Bruyn 54* (42); Claude Henderson 2/33 (4 overs)

Lions won by 4 wickets
New Wanderers Stadium, Johannesburg
Umpires: Murray Brown and Earl Hendrikse
Player of the match: Robert Frylinck (batsman), Ethan O'Reilly (bowler) (Lions)

- Lions won the toss and elected to field.

30 January
14:30
Scorecard

Titans; 163/5 (20 overs)	v	Warriors; 164/8 (20 overs)
Jacques Rudolph 58 (44); Justin Kreusch 2/23 (4 overs)		Mark Boucher 60* (33); Roelof van der Merwe 3/26 (4 overs)

Warriors won by 2 wickets
Buffalo Park, East London
Umpires: Karl Hurter and Dennis Smith
Player of the match: Mark Boucher (batsman) (Warriors), Roelof van der Merwe (bowler) (Titans)

- Titans won the toss and elected to bat.

2 February
18:00 (D/N)
Scorecard

Dolphins; 171/6 (20 overs)	v	Knights; 117/3 (15 overs)
Loots Bosman 57 (41); Ryan McLaren 3/34 (4 overs)		Dean Elgar 48* (33); Kyle Abbott 1/9 (2 overs)

Dolphins won by 6 runs (D/L)
OUTsurance Oval, Bloemfontein
Umpires: Murray Brown and Johanes Cloete
Player of the match: Loots Bosman (batsman) (Dolphins), Johan van der Wath (bowler) (Knights)

- Knights won the toss and elected to field.
- Rain reduced the Knights' target to 124 from 15 overs according to the Duckworth–Lewis method.

4 February
18:00 (D/N)
Scorecard

Lions; 169/5 (20 overs)	v	Titans; 172/9 (20 overs)
Alviro Petersen 54 (42); Roelof van der Merwe 2/28 (3 overs)		Jacques Rudolph 58 (43); Ethan O'Reilly 2/25 (4 overs)

Titans won by 1 wicket
New Wanderers Stadium, Johannesburg
Umpires: Johanes Cloete and Gerrie Pienaar
Player of the match: Jacques Rudolph (batsman) (Titans), Alfonso Thomas (bowler) (Lions)

- Titans won the toss and elected to field.

4 February
18:00 (D/N)
Scorecard

Dolphins; 155/4 (20 overs)	v	Warriors; 144/5 (20 overs)
David Miller 90* (57); Rusty Theron 1/20 (4 overs)		Jon-Jon Smuts 68* (51); Jon Kent 2/18 (4 overs)

Dolphins won by 11 runs
Buffalo Park, East London
Umpires: Murray Brown and Shaun George
Player of the match: David Miller (batsman), Jon Kent (bowler) (Dolphins)

- Dolphins won the toss and elected to bat.

6 February
14:30
Scorecard

Cape Cobras; 91/1 (10 overs)	v	Knights; 81/6 (10 overs)
Richard Levi 51* (30)		Rilee Rossouw 35 (17); Charl Langeveldt 2/10 (2 overs)

Cape Cobras won by 13 runs (D/L)
OUTsurance Oval, Bloemfontein
Umpires: Earl Hendrikse and Gerrie Pienaar
Player of the match: Richard Levi (batsman), Charl Langeveldt (bowler) (Cape Cobras)

- Knights won the toss and elected to field.
- Rain reduced the match to 10 overs per side and revised the Knights' target to 95 runs from 10 overs according to the Duckworth–Lewis method.

9 February
18:00 (D/N)
Scorecard

Knights; 137/6 (20 overs)	v	Lions; 12/2 (2.3 overs)
Reeza Hendricks 47 (38); Zander de Bruyn 2/21 (3 overs)		Jonathan Vandiar 8 (10); Ryan McLaren 1/5 (1 over)

No result
Senwes Park, Potchefstroom
Umpires: Adrian Holdstock and Gerrie Pienaar

- Knights won the toss and elected to bat.
- Match abandoned due to rain.

11 February
18:00 (D/N)
Scorecard

Dolphins; 154/3 (20 overs)	v	Cape Cobras; 145/7 (20 overs)
Devon Conway 62* (60); Justin Kemp 1/20 (3 overs)		Andrew Puttick 32 (40); Kyle Abbott 2/21 (4 overs)

Dolphins won by 9 runs
Kingsmead, Durban
Umpires: Earl Hendrikse and Dennis Smith
Player of the match: Vaughn van Jaarsveld (batsman), Kyle Abbott (bowler) (Dolphins)

- Cape Cobras won the toss and elected to field.

11 February
18:00 (D/N)
Scorecard

Warriors; 152/9 (20 overs)	v	Knights; 146/6 (20 overs)
Justin Kreusch 57 (42); Ryan McLaren 4/16 (4 overs)		Dean Elgar 64* (49); Rusty Theron 3/26 (4 overs)

Warriors won by 6 runs
De Beers Diamond Oval, Kimberley
Umpires: Adrian Holdstock and Karl Hurter
Player of the match: Justin Kreusch (batsman), Rusty Theron (bowler) (Warriors)

- Warriors won the toss and elected to bat.

13 February
14:30
Scorecard

Dolphins; 103/6 (20 overs)	v	Titans; 107/3 (15.1 overs)
Ahmed Amla 44* (39); Albie Morkel 2/19 (3.5 overs)		Henry Davids 45 (32); Imraan Khan 1/10 (2 overs)

Titans won by 7 wickets
SuperSport Park, Centurion
Umpires: Shaun George and Brian Jerling
Player of the match: Henry Davids (batsman), Albie Morkel (bowler) (Titans)

- Dolphins won the toss and elected to bat.

16 February
18:00 (D/N)
Scorecard

Warriors; 122/7 (20 overs)	v	Lions; 116/8 (20 overs)
Jon-Jon Smuts 26 (24); Paul Harris 2/26 (4 overs)		Zander de Bruyn 26 (27); Lyall Meyer 2/6 (1 over)

Warriors won by 6 runs
St George's Park, Port Elizabeth
Umpires: Adrian Holdstock and Brad White
Player of the match: Jon-Jon Smuts (batsman), Lyall Meyer (bowler) (Warriors)

- Warriors won the toss and elected to bat.

18 February
14:30
Scorecard

Knights; 142/6 (20 overs)	v	Titans; 146/5 (18 overs)
Reeza Hendricks 46 (35); Pierre Joubert 3/23 (4 overs)		Albie Morkel 46* (30); Dillon du Preez 2/13 (3 overs)

Titans won by 5 wickets
SuperSport Park, Centurion
Umpires: Ian Howell and Brad White
Player of the match: Albie Morkel (batsman), Pierre Joubert (bowler) (Titans)

- Titans won the toss and elected to field.

18 February
18:00 (D/N)
Scorecard

Warriors; 126/7 (20 overs)	v	Cape Cobras; 127/3 (18.5 overs)
Ashwell Prince 57 (55); Michael Rippon 2/28 (4 overs)		Owais Shah 58* (45); Justin Kreusch 1/14 (3 overs)

Cape Cobras won by 7 wickets
Newlands, Cape Town
Umpires: Karl Hurter and Brian Jerling
Player of the match: Owais Shah (batsman), Michael Rippon (bowler) (Cape Cobras)

- Warriors won the toss and elected to bat.

20 February
14:30
Scorecard

Lions; 156/3 (20 overs)	v	Dolphins; 157/7 (19.4 overs)
Alviro Petersen 84* (54); Kyle Abbott 2/17 (4 overs)		Loots Bosman 42 (19); Ethan O'Reilly 2/26 (4 overs)

Dolphins won by 3 wickets
Kingsmead, Durban
Umpires: Ian Howell and Dennis Smith
Player of the match: Loots Bosman (batsman), Kyle Abbott (bowler) (Dolphins)

- Lions won the toss and elected to bat.

=== Knockout stage ===
==== Semi-finals ====
25 February
18:00 (D/N)
Scorecard

Dolphins; 128/5 (20 overs)	v	Warriors; 129/6 (18.5 overs)
Ahmed Amla 52* (41); Makhaya Ntini 3/19 (4 overs)		Davy Jacobs 27 (41); Jon Kent 3/25 (4 overs)

Warriors won by 4 wickets
St George's Park, Port Elizabeth
Umpires: Murray Brown and Dennis Smith
Player of the match: Ahmed Amla (batsman) (Dolphins), Makhaya Ntini (bowler) (Warriors)

- Dolphins won the toss and elected to bat.

27 February
14:30
Scorecard

Titans; 141/6 (20 overs)	v	Cape Cobras; 142/2 (14.1 overs)
Albie Morkel 25* (18); Claude Henderson 2/29 (4 overs)		Herschelle Gibbs 54 (42); Ethy Mbhalati 1/17 (2.1 overs)

Cape Cobras won by 8 wickets
Newlands, Cape Town
Umpires: Ian Howell and Brian Jerling
Player of the match: Herschelle Gibbs (batsman), Michael Rippon (bowler) (Cape Cobras)

- Titans won the toss and elected to bat.

4 March
18:00 (D/N)
Scorecard

Dolphins; 124/7 (20 overs)	v	Warriors; 127/6 (20 overs)
Jon Kent 22* (20); Makhaya Ntini 2/23 (4 overs)		Mark Boucher 57* (53); Yasir Arafat 2/24 (4 overs)

Warriors won by 4 wickets
Kingsmead, Durban
Umpires: Adrian Holdstock and Karl Hurter
Player of the match: Mark Boucher (batsman), Makhaya Ntini (bowler) (Warriors)

- Dolphins won the toss and elected to bat.

9 March
18:00 (D/N)
Scorecard

Titans; 222/4 (20 overs)	v	Cape Cobras; 224/5 (19.4 overs)
Albie Morkel 71* (27); Johann Louw 2/50 (4 overs)		Owais Shah 64 (34); Albie Morkel 2/31 (4 overs)

Cape Cobras won by 5 wickets
SuperSport Park, Centurion
Umpires: Shaun George and Brian Jerling
Player of the match: Owais Shah (batsman) (Cape Cobras), Albie Morkel (bowler) (Titans)

- Cape Cobras won the toss and elected to field.

==== Final ====
18 March
18:00 (D/N)
Scorecard

Cape Cobras; 166/5 (20 overs)	v	Warriors; 154/6 (20 overs)
Richard Levi 45 (34); Justin Kreusch 2/23 (4 overs)		Kelly Smuts 56* (32); Justin Kemp 2/29 (3 overs)

Cape Cobras won by 12 runs
Newlands, Cape Town
Umpires: Johanes Cloete and Shaun George
Player of the match: Kelly Smuts (batsman) (Warriors), Claude Henderson (bowler) (Cape Cobras)

- Warriors won the toss and elected to field.
