= 2009 Champions League Twenty20 squads =

This is a list of the squads that qualified for the 2009 Champions League Twenty20.

== New South Wales Blues ==
Coach: (Australia) Matthew Mott

No.	Player	Nat	Date of birth	Batting	Bowling style
37	Simon Katich (c)	(Australia)	21 August 1975 (aged 34)	Left	Slow left-arm wrist-spin
3	Aaron Bird	(Australia)	28 September 1983 (aged 26)	Right	Right-arm fast
4	Doug Bollinger	(Australia)	24 July 1981 (aged 28)	Left	Left-arm fast-medium
10	Stuart Clark	(Australia)	28 September 1975 (aged 34)	Right	Right-arm fast-medium
43	Nathan Hauritz	(Australia)	18 October 1981 (aged 27)	Right	Right-arm off break
21	Moisés Henriques	(Australia)	1 February 1987 (aged 22)	Right	Right-arm fast-medium
22	Phillip Hughes	(Australia)	30 November 1988 (aged 20)	Left	—
45	Simon Keen	(Australia)	4 October 1987 (aged 22)	Left	Right-arm medium
58	Brett Lee	(Australia)	8 November 1976 (aged 32)	Right	Right-arm fast
72	Stephen O'Keefe	(Australia)	9 December 1984 (aged 24)	Right	Slow left-arm orthodox
99	Ben Rohrer	(Australia)	26 March 1981 (aged 28)	Left	—
13	Daniel Smith (wk)	(Australia)	17 March 1982 (aged 27)	Right	—
19	Steve Smith	(Australia)	2 June 1989 (aged 20)	Right	Leg break googly
27	Dominic Thornely	(Australia)	1 October 1978 (aged 31)	Right	Right-arm medium, Right-arm off break
31	David Warner	(Australia)	27 October 1986 (aged 22)	Left	Leg break

== Victorian Bushrangers ==
Coach: (Australia) Greg Shipperd

No.	Player	Nat	Date of birth	Batting	Bowling style
9	Cameron White (c)	(Australia)	18 August 1983 (aged 26)	Right	Leg break googly
6	Aiden Blizzard	(Australia)	27 June 1984 (aged 25)	Left	Left-arm medium
5	Aaron Finch	(Australia)	17 November 1986 (aged 22)	Right	Left-arm medium
2	Shane Harwood	(Australia)	1 March 1974 (aged 35)	Right	Right-arm fast-medium
11	John Hastings	(Australia)	4 November 1985 (aged 23)	Right	Right-arm fast-medium
7	Brad Hodge	(Australia)	29 December 1974 (aged 34)	Right	Right-arm off break
27	Jon Holland	(Australia)	29 May 1987 (aged 22)	Right	Slow left arm orthodox
8	David Hussey	(Australia)	15 July 1977 (aged 32)	Right	Right-arm off break
4	Andrew McDonald	(Australia)	5 June 1981 (aged 28)	Right	Right-arm fast-medium
18	Bryce McGain	(Australia)	25 March 1972 (aged 37)	Right	Leg break googly
15	Clinton McKay	(Australia)	22 February 1983 (aged 26)	Right	Right-arm fast-medium
12	Rob Quiney	(Australia)	20 August 1982 (aged 27)	Left	Right-arm medium
20	Peter Siddle	(Australia)	25 November 1984 (aged 24)	Right	Right-arm fast-medium
13	Matthew Wade (wk)	(Australia)	26 December 1987 (aged 21)	Left	—
3	Damien Wright	(Australia)	25 July 1975 (aged 34)	Right	Right-arm fast-medium

== Sussex Sharks ==
Coach: (England) Mark Robinson

No.	Player	Nat	Date of birth	Batting	Bowling style
20	Michael Yardy (c)	(England)	27 November 1980 (aged 28)	Left	Slow left arm orthodox
18	William Beer	(England)	8 October 1988 (aged 21)	Right	Leg break
26	Ben Brown	(England)	23 November 1988 (aged 20)	Right	—
8	Piyush Chawla	(India)	24 December 1988 (aged 20)	Left	Leg break
25	Joe Gatting	(England)	25 November 1987 (aged 21)	Right	Right-arm off break
27	Rory Hamilton-Brown	(England)	3 September 1987 (aged 22)	Right	Right-arm off break
19	Andy Hodd (wk)	(England)	12 January 1984 (aged 25)	Right	—
24	Ed Joyce	(Republic of Ireland)	22 September 1978 (aged 31)	Left	Right-arm medium
88	Chad Keegan	(England)	30 July 1979 (aged 30)	Right	Right-arm fast-medium
6	James Kirtley	(England)	10 January 1975 (aged 34)	Right	Right-arm fast-medium
—	Robin Martin-Jenkins	(England)	28 October 1975 (aged 33)	Right	Right-arm medium
23	Chris Nash	(England)	19 May 1983 (aged 26)	Right	Right-arm off break
50	Dwayne Smith	(Barbados)	12 April 1983 (aged 26)	Right	Right-arm medium
10	Luke Wright	(England)	7 March 1985 (aged 24)	Right	Right-arm medium-fast
29	Yasir Arafat	(Pakistan)	12 March 1982 (aged 27)	Right	Right-arm fast

== Somerset Sabres ==
Coach: (England) Andrew Hurry

No.	Player	Nat	Date of birth	Batting	Bowling style
5	Justin Langer (c)	(Australia)	21 November 1970 (aged 38)	Left	Right-arm medium
3	Omari Banks	(Anguilla)	17 July 1982 (aged 27)	Right	Right-arm off break
15	Jos Buttler	(England)	8 September 1990 (aged 19)	Right	—
58	Zander de Bruyn	(South Africa)	5 July 1975 (aged 34)	Right	Right-arm fast-medium
11	Wes Durston	(England)	6 October 1980 (aged 29)	Right	Right-arm off break
25	James Hildreth	(England)	9 September 1984 (aged 25)	Right	Right-arm medium-fast
9	Craig Kieswetter (wk)	(England)	28 November 1987 (aged 21)	Right	Right-arm slow
13	Ben Phillips	(England)	30 September 1974 (aged 35)	Right	Right-arm fast-medium
23	Arul Suppiah	(England)	30 August 1983 (aged 26)	Right	Slow left arm orthodox
8	Alfonso Thomas	(South Africa)	9 February 1977 (aged 32)	Right	Right-arm fast-medium
7	Peter Trego	(England)	12 June 1981 (aged 28)	Right	Right-arm medium
2	Marcus Trescothick	(England)	25 December 1975 (aged 33)	Left	Right-arm medium
26	Mark Turner	(England)	23 October 1984 (aged 24)	Right	Right-arm medium-fast
24	Max Waller	(England)	3 March 1988 (aged 21)	Right	Leg break
1	Charl Willoughby	(South Africa)	3 December 1974 (aged 34)	Left	Left-arm fast-medium

== Deccan Chargers ==
Coach: (Australia) Darren Lehmann

No.	Player	Nat	Date of birth	Batting	Bowling style
18	Adam Gilchrist (c & wk)	(Australia)	14 November 1971 (aged 37)	Left	Right-arm off break
65	Shoaib Ahmed	(India)	19 November 1987 (aged 21)	Right	Right-arm fast-medium
44	Azhar Bilakhia	(India)	31 May 1986 (aged 23)	Right	Right-arm medium
15	Fidel Edwards	(Barbados)	6 February 1982 (aged 27)	Right	Right-arm fast
3	Abhinav Kumar	(India)	7 November 1984 (aged 24)	Right	—
19	V. V. S. Laxman	(India)	1 November 1974 (aged 34)	Right	Right-arm off break
30	Pragyan Ojha	(India)	5 September 1986 (aged 23)	Left	Slow left arm orthodox
36	Venugopal Rao	(India)	26 February 1982 (aged 27)	Right	Right-arm off break
45	Rohit Sharma	(India)	30 April 1987 (aged 22)	Right	Right-arm off break
12	Harmeet Singh	(India)	9 October 1987 (aged 21)	Right	Right-arm medium
9	R. P. Singh	(India)	6 December 1985 (aged 23)	Right	Left-arm fast-medium
56	Scott Styris	(New Zealand)	10 July 1975 (aged 34)	Right	Right-arm medium
2	Tirumalasetti Suman	(India)	15 December 1983 (aged 25)	Right	Right-arm off break
63	Andrew Symonds	(Australia)	9 June 1975 (aged 34)	Right	Right-arm medium
22	Chaminda Vaas	(Sri Lanka)	27 January 1974 (aged 35)	Left	Left-arm fast-medium

== Royal Challengers Bangalore ==
Coach: (South Africa) Ray Jennings

No.	Player	Nat	Date of birth	Batting	Bowling style
37	Anil Kumble (c)	(India)	17 October 1970 (aged 38)	Right	Leg break googly
25	Balachandra Akhil	(India)	7 October 1977 (aged 32)	Right	Right-arm medium-fast
42	Rajesh Bishnoi	(India)	8 October 1987 (aged 22)	Right	Right-arm medium-fast
9	Mark Boucher (wk)	(South Africa)	3 December 1976 (aged 32)	Right	Right-arm medium
19	Rahul Dravid	(India)	11 January 1973 (aged 36)	Right	Right-arm off break
3	Jacques Kallis	(South Africa)	16 October 1975 (aged 33)	Right	Right-arm fast-medium
5	Virat Kohli	(India)	5 November 1988 (aged 20)	Right	Right-arm medium
—	Bhuvneshwar Kumar	(India)	5 December 1990 (aged 18)	Right	Right-arm medium
8	Praveen Kumar	(India)	2 October 1986 (aged 23)	Right	Right-arm medium
69	Manish Pandey	(India)	10 September 1989 (aged 20)	Right	Right-arm off break
2	Dale Steyn	(South Africa)	27 June 1983 (aged 26)	Right	Right-arm fast
21	Ross Taylor	(New Zealand)	8 March 1984 (aged 25)	Right	Right-arm off break
11	Robin Uthappa	(India)	11 November 1985 (aged 23)	Right	Right-arm medium
52	Roelof van der Merwe	(South Africa)	31 December 1984 (aged 24)	Right	Slow left arm orthodox
23	Vinay Kumar	(India)	12 February 1984 (aged 25)	Right	Right-arm medium

== Delhi Daredevils ==
Coach: (Australia) David Saker

No.	Player	Nat	Date of birth	Batting	Bowling style
5	Gautam Gambhir (c)	(India)	14 October 1981 (aged 27)	Left	Leg break
27	Rajat Bhatia	(India)	22 October 1979 (aged 29)	Right	Right-arm medium-fast
55	Tillakaratne Dilshan	(Sri Lanka)	14 October 1976 (aged 32)	Right	Right-arm off break
46	Dinesh Karthik (wk)	(India)	1 June 1985 (aged 24)	Right	—
11	Glenn McGrath	(Australia)	9 February 1970 (aged 39)	Right	Right-arm fast-medium
12	Mithun Manhas	(India)	12 October 1979 (aged 29)	Right	Right-arm off break
99	Amit Mishra	(India)	24 November 1982 (aged 26)	Right	Leg break
6	Yogesh Nagar	(India)	6 January 1990 (aged 19)	Right	Right-arm off break
26	Dirk Nannes	(Australia)	16 May 1976 (aged 33)	Right	Left-arm fast
64	Ashish Nehra	(India)	29 April 1979 (aged 30)	Right	Left-arm medium-fast
20	Aavishkar Salvi	(India)	20 October 1981 (aged 27)	Right	Right-arm medium
18	Pradeep Sangwan	(India)	5 November 1990 (aged 18)	Right	Left-arm medium
44	Virender Sehwag	(India)	20 October 1978 (aged 30)	Right	Right-arm off break
3	Owais Shah	(England)	22 October 1978 (aged 30)	Right	Right-arm off break
9	Manoj Tiwary	(India)	14 November 1985 (aged 23)	Right	Leg break googly

== Otago Volts ==
Coach: (New Zealand) Mike Hesson

No.	Player	Nat	Date of birth	Batting	Bowling style
13	Craig Cumming (c)	(New Zealand)	31 August 1975 (aged 34)	Right	—
—	Nick Beard	(New Zealand)	16 September 1989 (aged 20)	Left	Slow left arm orthodox
4	Neil Broom	(New Zealand)	20 November 1983 (aged 25)	Right	Right-arm medium
6	Ian Butler	(New Zealand)	24 November 1981 (aged 27)	Right	Right-arm fast
14	Derek de Boorder	(New Zealand)	25 October 1985 (aged 23)	Right	—
—	Matt Harvie	(New Zealand)	7 June 1984 (aged 25)	Right	Right-arm medium-fast
42	Brendon McCullum (wk)	(New Zealand)	27 September 1981 (aged 28)	Right	Right-arm medium
8	Nathan McCullum	(New Zealand)	1 September 1980 (aged 29)	Right	Right-arm off break
—	James McMillan	(New Zealand)	14 June 1978 (aged 31)	Right	Right-arm fast-medium
9	Warren McSkimming	(New Zealand)	21 June 1979 (aged 30)	Right	Right-arm medium
—	Dimitri Mascarenhas	(England)	30 October 1977 (aged 31)	Right	Right-arm fast-medium
1	Aaron Redmond	(New Zealand)	23 September 1979 (aged 30)	Right	Leg break
7	Hamish Rutherford	(New Zealand)	27 April 1989 (aged 20)	Left	—
—	Greg Todd	(New Zealand)	17 June 1982 (aged 27)	Left	Right-arm medium
11	Neil Wagner	(New Zealand)	13 March 1986 (aged 23)	Left	Left-arm medium-fast

== Cape Cobras ==
Coach: (South Africa) Shukri Conrad

No.	Player	Nat	Date of birth	Batting	Bowling style
4	Andrew Puttick (c)	(South Africa)	11 December 1980 (aged 28)	Left	—
13	Derek Brand	(South Africa)	29 May 1975 (aged 34)	Right	Right-arm medium
7	Ryan Canning (wk)	(South Africa)	22 February 1984 (aged 25)	Right	—
19	Henry Davids	(South Africa)	19 January 1980 (aged 29)	Right	Right-arm medium-fast
21	Jean-Paul Duminy	(South Africa)	14 April 1984 (aged 25)	Left	Right-arm off break
8	Sybrand Engelbrecht	(South Africa)	15 September 1988 (aged 21)	Right	Right-arm off break
0	Herschelle Gibbs	(South Africa)	23 February 1974 (aged 35)	Right	Right-arm bowler
29	Claude Henderson	(South Africa)	14 June 1972 (aged 37)	Right	Slow left arm orthodox
9	Rory Kleinveldt	(South Africa)	15 March 1983 (aged 26)	Right	Right-arm fast-medium
88	Richard Levi	(South Africa)	14 January 1988 (aged 21)	Right	Right-arm medium
10	Justin Ontong	(South Africa)	4 January 1980 (aged 29)	Right	Right-arm off break
24	Vernon Philander	(South Africa)	24 June 1985 (aged 24)	Right	Right-arm fast-medium
86	Francois Plaatjies	(South Africa)	26 August 1986 (aged 23)	Right	Right-arm fast-medium
74	Stiaan van Zyl	(South Africa)	19 September 1987 (aged 22)	Left	Right-arm medium
23	Monde Zondeki	(South Africa)	25 July 1982 (aged 27)	Right	Right-arm fast

== Diamond Eagles ==
No.	Player	Nat	Date of birth	Batting	Bowling style
77	Boeta Dippenaar (c)	(South Africa)	14 June 1977 (aged 32)	Right	Right-arm off break
7	Ryan Bailey	(South Africa)	7 September 1982 (aged 27)	Right	Right-arm medium
57	Jandre Coetzee	(South Africa)	15 January 1984 (aged 25)	Left	Left-arm medium
10	Cornelius de Villiers	(South Africa)	16 March 1986 (aged 23)	Right	Right-arm medium-fast
26	Dillon du Preez	(South Africa)	8 November 1981 (aged 27)	Right	Right-arm fast-medium
64	Dean Elgar	(South Africa)	11 June 1987 (aged 22)	Left	Left-arm slow
17	Reeza Hendricks	(South Africa)	14 August 1989 (aged 20)	Right	Right-arm medium-fast
25	Alan Kruger	(South Africa)	16 February 1981 (aged 28)	Right	Right-arm medium-fast
21	Adrian McLaren (wk)	(South Africa)	21 April 1980 (aged 29)	Right	—
8	Ryan McLaren	(South Africa)	9 February 1983 (aged 26)	Left	Right-arm medium-fast
60	Victor Mpitsang	(South Africa)	28 March 1980 (aged 29)	Right	Right-arm fast-medium
9	Rilee Rossouw	(South Africa)	9 October 1989 (aged 19)	Left	Right-arm off break
0	Thandi Tshabalala	(South Africa)	19 November 1984 (aged 24)	Right	Right-arm off break
16	Shadley van Schalkwyk	(South Africa)	5 August 1988 (aged 21)	Left	Right-arm medium-fast
44	Morne van Wyk	(South Africa)	20 March 1979 (aged 30)	Right	Slow left arm orthodox

== Wayamba ==
Coach: (Sri Lanka) Lanka de Silva

No.	Player	Nat	Date of birth	Batting	Bowling style
42	Jehan Mubarak (c)	(Sri Lanka)	10 January 1981 (aged 28)	Left	Right-arm off break
54	Ishara Amerasinghe	(Sri Lanka)	5 March 1978 (aged 31)	Right	Right-arm fast-medium
44	Sameera de Zoysa (wk)	(Sri Lanka)	31 January 1987 (aged 22)	Left	—
14	Rangana Herath	(Sri Lanka)	19 March 1978 (aged 31)	Left	Slow left arm orthodox
27	Mahela Jayawardene	(Sri Lanka)	27 May 1977 (aged 32)	Right	Right-arm medium
69	Shalika Karunanayake	(Sri Lanka)	14 February 1987 (aged 22)	Right	Right-arm fast-medium
24	Jeevantha Kulatunga	(Sri Lanka)	2 November 1973 (aged 35)	Right	Right-arm medium
77	Kaushal Lokuarachchi	(Sri Lanka)	20 May 1982 (aged 27)	Right	Leg break
28	Farveez Maharoof	(Sri Lanka)	7 September 1984 (aged 25)	Right	Right-arm fast-medium
40	Ajantha Mendis	(Sri Lanka)	11 March 1985 (aged 24)	Right	Right-arm off break
1	Thisara Perera	(Sri Lanka)	3 April 1989 (aged 20)	Left	Right-arm medium-fast
61	Isuru Udana	(Sri Lanka)	17 February 1988 (aged 21)	Right	Left-arm medium-fast
6	Mahela Udawatte	(Sri Lanka)	19 July 1986 (aged 23)	Left	Right-arm off break
19	Michael Vandort	(Sri Lanka)	19 January 1980 (aged 29)	Left	Right-arm medium
12	Chanaka Welegedara	(Sri Lanka)	20 March 1981 (aged 28)	Right	Left-arm fast-medium

== Trinidad & Tobago ==
Coach: (Trinidad and Tobago) Kelvin Williams

No.	Player	Nat	Date of birth	Batting	Bowling style
1	Daren Ganga (c)	(Trinidad and Tobago)	14 January 1979 (aged 30)	Right	Right-arm off break
7	Samuel Badree	(Trinidad and Tobago)	9 March 1981 (aged 28)	Right	Leg break
15	Adrian Barath	(Trinidad and Tobago)	14 April 1990 (aged 19)	Right	Right-arm off break
47	Dwayne Bravo	(Trinidad and Tobago)	7 October 1983 (aged 26)	Right	Right-arm medium-fast
46	Darren Bravo	(Trinidad and Tobago)	6 February 1989 (aged 20)	Left	Right-arm medium-fast
51	Rayad Emrit	(Trinidad and Tobago)	8 March 1981 (aged 28)	Right	Right-arm medium-fast
5	Sherwin Ganga	(Trinidad and Tobago)	13 February 1982 (aged 27)	Left	Right-arm off break
31	Dave Mohammed	(Trinidad and Tobago)	8 October 1979 (aged 30)	Left	Slow left-arm wrist-spin
24	Sunil Narine	(Trinidad and Tobago)	26 May 1988 (aged 21)	Left	Right-arm off break
40	William Perkins	(Trinidad and Tobago)	8 October 1986 (aged 23)	Right	—
55	Kieron Pollard	(Trinidad and Tobago)	12 May 1987 (aged 22)	Right	Right-arm medium-fast
80	Denesh Ramdin (wk)	(Trinidad and Tobago)	13 March 1985 (aged 24)	Right	—
14	Ravi Rampaul	(Trinidad and Tobago)	15 October 1984 (aged 24)	Left	Right-arm fast-medium
54	Lendl Simmons	(Trinidad and Tobago)	25 January 1985 (aged 24)	Right	Right-arm medium-fast
25	Navin Stewart	(Trinidad and Tobago)	13 June 1983 (aged 26)	Right	Right-arm fast-medium
