= 2009 Standard Bank Pro20 =

2009 Standard Bank Pro 20 Series
- Standard Bank Pro20
- Administrator: International Cricket Council
- Cricket format: Twenty20
- Tournament format(s): Round-robin and Knockout
- Host: South Africa
- Champions: Cape Cobras (1st title)
- Participants: 6
- Matches: 22
- Most runs: Morne van Wyk (269) (Eagles)
- Most wickets: Charl Langeveldt (16) (Cobras)

The 2008–09 Standard Bank Pro20 was the sixth edition of the Standard Bank Pro20 Series and the sixth edition of the CSA T20 Challenge overall. For the first time in the competition's history the semi-finals were best of three contests, both semis went to the third match and both were tied, the finalists were decided by a super over tie breaker. The series began on 21 January 2009 and finished with the final on 21 February 2009.

== Teams ==
- Cape Cobras in Cape Town and Paarl
- Dolphins in Durban and Pietermaritzburg
- Diamond Eagles in Bloemfontein and Kimberley
- Highveld Lions in Johannesburg and Potchefstroom
- Titans in Centurion and Benoni
- Warriors in East London and Port Elizabeth

== Stadiums ==
Stadium	City	Capacity	Home team
Sahara Park Newlands	Cape Town	25 000	Cape Cobra
Boland Park	Paarl	10 000	Cape Cobra
Sahara Park Kingsmead	Durban	25 000	Dolphins
Pietermaritzburg Oval	Pietermaritzburg	12 000	Dolphins
OUTsurance Oval	Bloemfontein	20 000	Diamond Eagles
De Beers Diamond Oval	Kimberley	11 000	Diamond Eagles
Liberty Life Wanderers Stadium	Johannesburg	34 000	Highveld Lions
Senwes Park	Potchefstroom	9 000	Highveld Lions
Willowmoore Park	Benoni	20 000	Titans
Supersport Park	Centurion	20 000	Titans
Sahara Oval St George's	Port Elizabeth	19 000	Warriors
Buffalo Park	East London	15 000	Warriors

== Standings ==
Pos	Team	Pld	W	L	T	NR	BP	Ded	Pts	NRR
1	Warriors	5	4	1	0	0	1	0	17	1.175
2	Dolphins	5	3	1	0	1	1	0	15	0.860
3	Cape Cobras	5	2	2	1	0	0	0	10	−0.690
4	Diamond Eagles	5	2	3	0	0	1	1	8	0.005
5	Titans	5	1	2	0	2	0	0	8	−1.473
6	Highveld Lions	5	0	3	1	1	0	0	4	−0.345

=== Point system ===
- Win, with bonus point: 5 Points
- Win, without bonus point: 4 Points
- Tie: 2 points
- No Result: 2 Points
- Loss: 0 points
- The team that achieves a run rate of 1.25 times that of the opposition shall be rewarded one bonus point.
- A team's run rate will be calculated by reference to the runs scored in an innings divided by the number of overs faced.

== Fixtures ==
=== Group stage ===
21 January 2009
Scorecard

Warriors; 169/5 (20 overs)	v	Titans; 88 (17.1 overs)
Davey Jacobs 71 (46); Francois du Plessis 2/23 (4 overs)		Blake Snijman 21 (20); Andrew Birch 4/22 (2.1 overs)

Warriors won by 81 runs
Sahara Oval St George's, Port Elizabeth
Umpires: M Erasmus & RE Koertzen
Player of the match: Davey Jacobs (Warriors)

23 January 2009
Scorecard

Cape Cobras; 207/2 (20 overs)	v	Warriors; 203/5 (20 overs)
Henry Davids 112 (48); Justin Kreusch 1/23 (2 overs)		Colin Ingram 84 (52); Charl Langeveldt 2/30 (4 overs)

Cape Cobras won by 4 runs
Sahara Park Newlands, Cape Town
Umpires: GH Pienaar & DJ Smith
Player of the match: Henry Davids (Cape Cobra)

23 January 2009
Scorecard

Dolphins; 184/2 (20 overs)	v	Diamond Eagles; 116 (18.2 overs)
Grant Rowley 88 (65); Ryan McLaren 1/29 (4 overs)		Ryan Bailey 31 (28); Daryn Smit 3/24 (4 overs)

Dolphins won by 68 runs
OUTsurance Oval, Bloemfontein
Umpires: RE Koertzen & ZTA Ndamane
Player of the match: HD Ackerman (Dolphins)

25 January 2009
Scorecard

Diamond Eagles; 156/3 (20 overs)	v	Highveld Lions; 148/7 (20 overs)
Morne van Wyk 89 (64); Robert Frylinck 1/23 (4 overs)		Dane Vilas 44 (33); Dillon du Preez 3/25 (4 overs)

Diamond Eagles won by 8 runs
Liberty Life Wanderers Stadium, Johannesburg
Umpires: AT Holdstock & RE Koertzen
Player of the match: Morne van Wyk (Diamond Eagles)

25 January 2009
Scorecard

Dolphins; 121/9 (20 overs)	v	Titans
Daryn Smit 31 (17); Ethy Mbhalati 2/6 (4 overs)

No Result (Rain Stopped Play)
Supersport Park, Centurion
Umpires: KH Hurter & ZTA Ndamane

28 January 2009
Scorecard

Diamond Eagles; 176/3 (20 overs)	v	Cape Cobra; 88 (15.1 overs)
Adrian McLaren 61 (42); Claude Henderson 1/21 (3 overs)		Andrew Puttick 23 (21); CJ de Villiers 3/15 (2.1 overs)

Diamond Eagles won by 88 runs
De Beers Diamond Oval, Kimberley
Umpires: GH Pienaar and DJ Smith
Player of the match: CJ de Villiers (Diamond Eagles)

30 January 2009
Scorecard

Cape Cobras; 119/8 (20 overs)	v	Dolphins; 120/7 (20 overs)
Richard Levi 46 (47); Yusuf Abdulla 3/23 (4 overs)		Johann Louw 28(15); Charl Langeveldt 2/38 (4 overs)

Dolphins won by 3 wickets
Sahara Park Kingsmead, Durban
Umpires: JD Cloete and LJ Willemse
Player of the match: Johann Louw (Dolphins)

30 January 2009
Scorecard

Titans	v	Highveld Lions

Match abandoned without a ball bowled
Liberty Life Wanderers Stadium, Johannesburg
Umpires: MW Brown and IL Howell

1 February 2009
Scorecard

Cape Cobras; 157/4 (20 overs)	v	Titans; 141/9 (20 overs)
Justin Ontong 59 (38); Imran Tahir 2/28 (4 overs)		Gulam Bodi 32 (28); Roger Telemachus 3/17 (4 overs)

Cape Cobras won by 16 runs
Sahara Park Newlands, Cape Town
Umpires: S George and DJ Smith
Player of the match: Justin Ontong & Roger Telemachus (Cape Cobra)

1 February 2009
Scorecard

Dolphins; 127 (19.5 overs)	v	Warriors; 131/2 (18.4 overs)
HD Ackerman 49 (42); Wayne Parnell 3/18 (4 overs)		Robin Peterson 72 (58); Johann Louw 2/15 (4 overs)

Warriors won by 8 wickets
Buffalo Park, East London
Umpires: EC Hendrikse and IL Howell
Player of the match: Robin Peterson (Warriors)

4 February 2009
Scorecard

Cape Cobras; 154/6 (20 overs)	v	Highveld Lions; 154/6 (20 overs)
Jean-Paul Duminy 56 (44); Craig Alexander 2/30 (4 overs)		Alviro Petersen 61 (50); Charl Langeveldt 3/21 (4 overs)

Match tied
Senwes Park, Potchefstroom
Umpires: JD Cloete and S George
Player of the match: Alviro Petersen (Highveld Lions)

6 February 2009
Scorecard

Highveld Lions; 123/5 (20 overs)	v	Warriors; 127/6 (19.3 overs)
Vaughn van Jaarsveld 40 (38); Robin Peterson 2/20 (3 overs)		Johan Botha 44 (27); Craig Alexander 3/14 (4 overs)

Warriors won by 4 wickets
Sahara Oval St George's, Port Elizabeth
Umpires: MW Brown & IL Howell
Player of the match: Johan Botha (Warriors)

6 February 2009
Scorecard

Diamond Eagles; 153/6 (20 overs)	v	Titans; 154/4 (18.5 overs)
Dean Elgar 47 (42); Roelof van der Merwe 2/27 (3 overs)		Blake Snijman 54 (38); Dillon du Preez 1/15 (3 overs)

Titans won by 6 wickets
Supersport Park, Centurion
Umpires: KH Hurter & BM White
Player of the match: Blake Snijman (Titans)

8 February 2009
Scorecard

Highveld Lions; 112/8 (20 overs)	v	Dolphins; 117/2 (19 overs)
Dane Vilas 55 (51); Yusuf Abdulla 3/28 (4 overs)		HD Ackerman 34 (36); Robert Frylinck 1/15 (4 overs)

Dolphins won by 8 wickets
Sahara Park Kingsmead, Durban
Umpires: JD Cloete & EC Hendrikse
Player of the match: Yusuf Abdulla (Dolphins)

8 February 2009
Scorecard

Warriors; 149/5 (20 overs)	v	Diamond Eagles; 131/7 (20 overs)
Ashwell Prince 46 (34); Dillon du Preez 2/21 (4 overs)		Dean Elgar 28 (31); Zander de Bruyn 1/14 (1 overs)

Warriors won by 18 runs
OUTsurance Oval, Bloemfontein
Umpires: MW Brown & KH Hurter

=== Knockout stage ===
==== Semi-finals ====
===== Warriors vs. Diamond Eagles =====
11 February 2009
Scorecard

Warriors; 100/6 (14 overs)	v	Diamond Eagles; 105/1 (12.1 overs)
Justin Kreusch 30 (28 runs); Ryan McLaren 2/17 (3 overs)		Boeta Dippenaar 53 (37 runs); Johan Botha 1/18 (3 overs)

Diamond Eagles won by 9 wickets (D/L)
OUTsurance Oval, Bloemfontein
Umpires: KH Hurter & DJ Smith
Player of the match: Boeta Dippenaar (Diamond Eagles)

15 February 2009
Scorecard

Warriors; 117/8 (20 overs)	v	Diamond Eagles; 2/0 (1.2 overs)
Ashwell Prince 40 (29 balls); CJ de Villiers 4/14 (4 overs)

No Result (Play stopped due to rain)
Sahara Oval St George's, Port Elizabeth
Umpires: MW Brown & GH Pienaar

16 February 2009
Scorecard

Diamond Eagles; 101/10 (19 overs)	v	Warriors; 103/0 (12.1 overs)
Dean Elgar 24 (24 balls); Robin Peterson 3/24 (4 overs)		Robin Peterson 49 (31 balls)

Warriors won by 10 wickets
Sahara Oval St George's, Port Elizabeth
Umpires: MW Brown & GH Pienaar
Player of the match: Robin Peterson (Warriors)

18 February 2009
Scorecard

Warriors; 97 (19.3 overs)	v	Diamond Eagles; 97/6 (20 overs)
Ashwell Prince 24 (25 balls); CJ de Villiers 5/12 (3.3 overs)		Dean Elgar 24 (32 balls); Juan Theron 2/15 (4 overs)

Scores level; Eagles won the Super Over
Sahara Oval St George's, Port Elizabeth
Umpires: EC Hendrikse & KH Hurter
Player of the match: CJ de Villiers (Diamond Eagles)

- Diamond Eagles win series 2–1

===== Dolphins vs. Cape Cobras =====
13 February 2009
Scorecard

Dolphins; 162/5 (20 overs)	v	Cape Cobras; 148/9 (20 overs)
HD Ackerman 62 (53 runs); Jean-Paul Duminy 1/7 (1 over)		Richard Levi 48 (28 runs); Yusuf Abdulla 3/12 (4 overs)

Dolphins won by 14 runs
Sahara Park Newlands, Cape Town
Umpires: M Erasmus & IL Howell
Player of the match: HD Ackerman (Dolphins)

15 February 2009
Scorecard

Cape Cobras; 191/4 (20 overs)	v	Dolphins; 59/5 (9 overs)
Hashim Amla 23 (18 balls); Roger Telemachus 1/8 (2 overs)		Herschelle Gibbs 99 (57runs); Alfonso Thomas 2/28 (3 overs)

Cape Cobras won by 38 runs (D/L method)
Sahara Park Kingsmead, Durban
Umpires: S George & BG Jerling

18 February 2009
Scorecard

Cape Cobras; 148/8 (20 overs)	v	Dolphins; 148/4 (20 overs)
Jean-Paul Duminy 53 (46 balls); Alfonso Thomas 2/14 (3 overs)		Johann Louw 48 (26 balls); Charl Langeveldt 4/20 (4 overs)

Scores level; Cape Cobras won the Super Over
Kingsmead, Durban
Umpires: S George & BG Jerling
Player of the match: Charl Langeveldt (Cape)

- Cape Cobras win series 2–1

==== Final ====
21 February 2009
Scorecard

Cape Cobras; 147/5 (20 overs)	v	Diamond Eagles; 125/8 (20 overs)
Herschelle Gibbs 87 (62 runs); Shadley van Schalkwyk 2/24 (4 overs)		Dean Elgar 34 (30 runs); Vernon Philander 3/17 (3 overs)

Cape Cobras won by 22 runs
Sahara Park Newlands, Cape Town
Umpires: S George & KH Hurter
Player of the match: Charl Langeveldt (Cape Cobras)

== Statistics ==
=== Most runs ===
Player	Team	Matches	Innings	Runs	Balls	Strike rate	Average	HS	100s	50s	0	4s	6s
(South Africa) Morne van Wyk	Eagles	9	8	257	204	125.98	42.83	89*	0	2	0	32	5
(South Africa) HD Ackerman	Dolphins	8	8	248	217	114.28	31.00	82	0	2	1	24	7
(South Africa) Robin Peterson	Warriors	9	9	210	170	123.52	30.00	72*	0	2	2	27	6
(South Africa) Justin Ontong	Cobras	8	7	208	158	131.64	34.66	59*	0	1	0	14	9
(South Africa) Davey Jacobs	Warriors	9	7	186	155	120.00	37.20	71*	0	1	0	9	9

=== Average ===
Player	Team	Matches	Innings	Runs	Balls	Strike rate	Average	HS	100s	50s	0	4s	6s
(South Africa) Johan Botha	Warriors	6	4	81	62	130.64	81.00	44*	0	0	0	5	2
(South Africa) Vernon Philander	Cape Cobras	6	6	66	46	143.47	66.00	21*	0	0	0	1	4
(South Africa) Dane Vilas	Highveld Lions	4	4	115	93	123.65	57.50	55*	0	1	0	5	4
(South Africa) Dean Elgar	Eagles	7	5	169	156	108.33	56.33	47	0	0	0	13	4
(South Africa) Pierre Joubert	Titans	4	2	46	37	124.32	46.00	26*	0	0	0	4	1

=== Most wickets ===
Player	Team	Matches	Overs	Maidens	Runs	Wickets	BBI	Ave	Economy	Strike rate
(South Africa) CJ de Villiers	Eagles	9	29.5	1	180	14	5/12	12.85	6.03	12.7
(South Africa) Charl Langeveldt	Cobras	8	29.0	0	193	13	4/20	14.84	6.65	13.3
(South Africa) Claude Henderson	Cobras	8	27.0	0	186	12	3/23	15.50	6.88	13.5
(South Africa) Yusuf Abdulla	Dolphins	8	28.0	1	171	10	3/13	17.10	6.10	16.8
(South Africa) Juan Theron	Warriors	9	30.0	0	152	9	3/16	16.88	5.06	20.0

=== Bowling average ===
Player	Team	Matches	Overs	Maidens	Runs	Wickets	BBI	Ave	Economy	Strike rate
(South Africa) Dean Elgar	Eagles	7	3.0	0	11	2	2/6	5.50	3.66	9.0
(South Africa) Jandre Coetzee	Eagles	1	4.0	0	19	3	3/19	6.33	4.75	8.0
(South Africa) Craig Alexander	Highveld Lions	3	10.0	0	58	5	3/14	11.60	5.80	12.0
(Pakistan) Imran Tahir	Titans	2	7.0	0	48	4	2/20	12.00	6.85	10.5
(South Africa) CJ de Villiers	Eagles	9	29.5	1	180	14	5/12	12.85	6.03	12.7
