= English cricket team in South Africa in 2009–10 =

	South Africa	England
- Dates: 6 November 2009 – 18 January 2010
Captains	Graeme Smith	Andrew Strauss (Tests & ODIs); Paul Collingwood (T20Is)

Test series
- Result: 4-match series drawn 1–1
Most runs	Graeme Smith (427)	Paul Collingwood (344)
Most wickets	Morne Morkel (19)	Graeme Swann (21)
- Player of the series: Mark Boucher (SA); Graeme Swann (Eng)

One Day International series
- Results: England won the 5-match series 2–1
Most runs	Alviro Petersen (166)	Paul Collingwood (193)
Most wickets	Wayne Parnell (5)	James Anderson (8)
- Player of the series: Paul Collingwood (Eng)

Twenty20 International series
- Results: 2-match series drawn 1–1
Most runs	Loots Bosman (152)	Eoin Morgan (95)
Most wickets	Ryan McLaren (4)	Luke Wright (2); Sajid Mahmood (2)

The England cricket team toured South Africa for a four-match Test series, a five-match One Day International (ODI) series and two Twenty20 Internationals between 6 November 2009 and 18 January 2010. The tour was balanced throughout, with both the Twenty20 International and Test series being drawn, and England narrowly winning the ODI series 2–1.

By levelling the Test series with victory in the final Test, South Africa retained the Basil D'Oliveira Trophy they had earnt in England in 2008. Despite the decision made in 2008 to grant Test series between South Africa and England "icon" status, and thus comprise five Test matches and only three ODI matches, the tour retained the previous balance of four Tests and five ODIs.

A quiet, friendly series erupted with controversy in the third and fourth Tests of the series. On the third day of the third Test, television images showed Stuart Broad standing on the ball, and fellow England pace-bowler James Anderson picking at the leather of the ball, causing South Africa to raise concerns about the condition of the ball, and the actions of the England duo. After some delay, the South African team announced that they were not making an official complaint to the International Cricket Council (ICC), who in turn confirmed that the matter was closed. In the fourth Test, after an apparent nick by Graeme Smith was taken by wicket-keeper Matt Prior, the umpire Tony Hill turned down the appeal, and third umpire Daryl Harper upheld Hill's decision on review. However, TV replays showed an audible noise as the ball passed the bat. England announced that they would lodge an official complaint with the ICC, with the England and Wales Cricket Board (ECB) asking for the review to be reinstated. The ICC defended Harper, but said that it would launch a "full and comprehensive investigation" into the incident after the match.

== Squads ==
England
Batsmen: Andrew Strauss (captain); Alastair Cook (vice-captain); Ian Bell; Michael Carberry; Paul Collingwood; Joe Denly; Eoin Morgan; Kevin Pietersen; Jonathan Trott; All-rounders: Adil Rashid; Luke Wright	Wicket-keepers: Steve Davies; Matt Prior; Bowlers: James Anderson; Tim Bresnan; Stuart Broad; Mark Davies; Sajid Mahmood; Graham Onions; Liam Plunkett; Ryan Sidebottom; Graeme Swann; James Tredwell

South Africa
Batsmen: Graeme Smith (captain); Hashim Amla; Loots Bosman; AB de Villiers; JP Duminy; Herschelle Gibbs; Ashwell Prince; Alviro Petersen; All-rounders: Johan Botha; Jacques Kallis; Ryan McLaren; Albie Morkel	Wicket-keepers: Mark Boucher; Heino Kuhn; Bowlers: Yusuf Abdullah; Friedel de Wet; Paul Harris; Charl Langeveldt; Roelof van der Merwe; Morné Morkel; Makhaya Ntini; Wayne Parnell; Dale Steyn; Lonwabo Tsotsobe

== T20I series ==
=== 1st T20I ===
13 November 2009 (D/N)
Scorecard

England; 202/6 (20 overs)	v	South Africa; 127/3 (13 overs)
Eoin Morgan 85* (45); Ryan McLaren 3/33 (4 overs)		Loots Bosman 58 (31); Luke Wright 1/17 (2 overs)

England won by 1 run (D/L method)
Wanderers Stadium, Johannesburg
Umpires: Marais Erasmus (SA) and Brian Jerling (SA)
Player of the match: Eoin Morgan (Eng)

- South Africa won the toss and elected to field.
- Rain stopped play after the 13th over of the South African innings and no further play was possible.
- The revised target for South Africa after 13 overs was 129 as per D/L method.

=== 2nd T20I ===
15 November 2009
Scorecard

South Africa; 241/6 (20 overs)	v	England; 157/8 (20 overs)
Loots Bosman 94 (45); Joe Denly 1/9 (1 over)		Jonathan Trott 51 (40); Dale Steyn 2/29 (4 overs)

South Africa won by 84 runs
Centurion Park, Centurion
Umpires: Marais Erasmus (SA) and Brian Jerling (SA)
Player of the match: Loots Bosman (SA)

- South Africa won the toss and elected to bat.

== ODI series ==
=== 1st ODI ===
20 November 2009 (D/N)
Scorecard

South Africa	v	England

Match abandoned without a ball bowled
Wanderers Stadium, Johannesburg
Umpires: Marais Erasmus (SA) and Rod Tucker (Aus)

- England won the toss and elected to field.
- Rain continued throughout the day and no play was possible.

=== 2nd ODI ===
22 November 2009
Scorecard

South Africa; 250/9 (50 overs)	v	England; 252/3 (46.0 overs)
Alviro Petersen 64 (65); James Anderson 3/60 (10 overs)		Paul Collingwood 105* (110); Charl Langeveldt 2/46 (10 overs)

England won by 7 wickets
Centurion Park, Centurion
Umpires: Brian Jerling (SA) and Rod Tucker (Aus)
Player of the match: Paul Collingwood (Eng)

- England won the toss and elected to field.

=== 3rd ODI ===
27 November 2009 (D/N)
Scorecard

South Africa; 354/6 (50 overs)	v	England; 242 (41.3 overs)
AB de Villiers 121 (85); Stuart Broad 4/71 (10 overs)		Paul Collingwood 86 (82); Wayne Parnell 5/48 (9.3 overs)

South Africa won by 112 runs
Newlands Cricket Ground, Cape Town
Umpires: Marais Erasmus (SA) and Rod Tucker (Aus)
Player of the match: AB de Villiers (SA)

- South Africa won the toss and elected to bat.

=== 4th ODI ===
29 November 2009
Scorecard

South Africa; 119 (36.5 overs)	v	England; 121/3 (31.2 overs)
Alviro Petersen 51 (79); James Anderson 5/23 (10 overs)		Jonathan Trott 52* (77); Johan Botha 2/22 (8 overs)

England won by 7 wickets
St George's Park, Port Elizabeth
Umpires: Brian Jerling (SA) and Rod Tucker (Aus)
Player of the match: James Anderson (Eng)

- South Africa won the toss and elected to bat.

=== 5th ODI ===
4 December 2009 (D/N)
Scorecard

South Africa	v	England

Match abandoned without a ball bowled
Kingsmead Cricket Ground, Durban
Umpires: Marais Erasmus (SA) and Rod Tucker (Aus)

- England won the toss and elected to field.
- Rain continued throughout the day and no play was possible.

== Test series ==
=== 1st Test ===
16–20 December 2009
Scorecard

South Africa	v	England
418 (153.2 overs); Jacques Kallis 120 (225); Graeme Swann 5/110 (45.2 overs)		356 (104 overs); Graeme Swann 85 (81); Paul Harris 5/123 (37 overs)
301/7d (85.5 overs); Hashim Amla 100 (213); James Anderson 4/73 (20.5 overs)		228/9 (96 overs); Kevin Pietersen 81 (143); Friedel de Wet 4/55 (23 overs)

Match drawn
Centurion Park, Centurion
Umpires: Aleem Dar (Pak) and Steve Davis (Aus)
Player of the match: Graeme Swann (Eng)

- England won the toss and elected to field.
- Makhaya Ntini (SA) played in his 100th Test.

=== 2nd Test ===
26–30 December 2009
Scorecard

South Africa	v	England
343 (108.3 overs); Jacques Kallis 75 (132); Graeme Swann 4/110 (35 overs)		574/9d (170 overs); Ian Bell 140 (227); Morne Morkel 3/78 (31 overs)
133 (50 overs); Paul Harris 36 (50); Graeme Swann 5/54 (21 overs)

England won by an innings and 98 runs
Kingsmead Cricket Ground, Durban
Umpires: Aleem Dar (Pak) and Amiesh Saheba (Ind)
Player of the match: Graeme Swann (Eng)

- South Africa won the toss and elected to bat.
- Day 1 was reduced to 61 overs due to bad light.

=== 3rd Test ===
3–7 January 2010
Scorecard

South Africa	v	England
291 (86.1 overs); Jacques Kallis 108 (189); James Anderson 5/63 (21.1 overs)		273 (88 overs); Matt Prior 76 (118); Morne Morkel 5/75 (22 overs)
447/7d (111.2 overs); Graeme Smith 183 (273); James Anderson 3/98 (22.2 overs)		296/9 (141 overs); Ian Bell 78 (213); Paul Harris 3/85 (40 overs)

Match drawn
Newlands Cricket Ground, Cape Town
Umpires: Daryl Harper (Aus) and Tony Hill (NZ)
Player of the match: Graeme Smith (SA)

- England won the toss and elected to field.

=== 4th Test ===
14–18 January 2010
Scorecard

England	v	South Africa
180 (47.5 overs); Paul Collingwood 47 (61); Dale Steyn 5/51 (13.5 overs)		423/7d (119 overs); Graeme Smith 105 (187); Stuart Broad 3/83 (29 overs)
169 (42.5 overs); Paul Collingwood 71 (88); Morne Morkel 4/59 (16 overs)

South Africa won by an innings and 74 runs
Wanderers Stadium, Johannesburg
Umpires: Steve Davis (Aus) and Tony Hill (NZ)
Player of the match: Morne Morkel and Dale Steyn (SA)

- England won the toss and elected to bat.

== Tour matches ==
=== 50-over: England XI v Diamond Eagles ===
6 November 2009 (D/N)
Scorecard

England XI; 294/7 (50 overs)	v	Diamond Eagles; 109 (26.4 overs)
Jonathan Trott 85 (104); Ryan Bailey 2/27 (5 overs)		Rilee Rossouw 17 (10); Paul Collingwood 2/9 (3.4 overs)

England XI won by 185 runs
Mangaung Oval, Bloemfontein
Umpires: M Erasmus and BG Jerling

=== 50-over: England XI v Chevrolet Warriors ===
8 November 2009
Scorecard

Chevrolet Warriors; 254/5 (50 overs)	v	England XI; 256/2 (40.5 overs)
Arno Jacobs 83* (83); Graeme Swann 3/26 (10 overs)		Andrew Strauss 117* (119); Juan Theron 1/30 (7.5 overs)

England XI won by 8 wickets
De Beers Diamond Oval, Kimberley
Umpires: M Erasmus and BG Jerling

=== 20-over: England XI v South Africa A ===
10 November 2009 (D/N)
Scorecard

England XI; 89 (17.3 overs)	v	South Africa A 90/6 (17.3 overs)
Alastair Cook 22 (30); Justin Ontong 2/9 (3 overs)		Vaughn van Jaarsveld 23 (12); Graeme Swann 2/9 (4 overs)

South Africa A won by 4 wickets
Mangaung Oval, Bloemfontein
Umpires: M Erasmus and BG Jerling
Player of the match: T Tshabalala (SA)

=== 50-over: England XI v South Africa A ===
17 November 2009 (D/N)
Scorecard

South Africa A 279/9 (50 overs)	v	England XI; 281/6 (48.1 overs)
Andrew Puttick 62 (74); Graham Onions 2/46 (9 overs)		Jonathan Trott 78 (89); Rory Kleinveldt 2/57 (10 overs)

England XI won by 4 wickets
Senwes Park, Potchefstroom
Umpires: M Erasmus and BG Jerling
Player of the match: IJL Trott (Eng)

=== 2-day: England XI v South African Airways Challenge XI ===
9–10 December
Scorecard

England XI	v	South African Airways Challenge XI
329/8d (78 overs); Alastair Cook 81 (144); Charl Pietersen 3/71 (18 overs)		167/7 (47 overs); Sammy-Joe Avontuur 68 (111); Graeme Swann 6/55 (16 overs)

Match drawn
Buffalo Park, East London
Umpires: S George and BG Jerling

11–12 December
Scorecard

England XI	v	South African Airways Challenge XI
317/5d (88 overs); Andrew Strauss 100 (163); Yaseen Vallie 1/32 (7 overs)		263 (64.3 overs); David Wiese 80 (88); Ryan Sidebottom 5/42 (16.3 overs)

Match drawn
Buffalo Park, East London
Umpires: BG Jerling and LJ Willemse

== Media coverage ==
Television

- Supersport – South Africa
- Sky Sports – United Kingdom and Ireland
- Ten Sports – India, Pakistan, Sri Lanka and Bangladesh
- Sky Sport – New Zealand
- Fox Sports – Australia
