= Quinton Friend =

South African cricketer

Personal information
- Full name: Quinton Friend
- Born: 16 February 1982 (age 44); Bellville, Western Cape, South Africa
- Nickname: Quinne
- Batting: Right-handed
- Bowling: Right-arm fast-medium
- Role: Bowler

Domestic team information
- Years: Team
- 2001/02—2006/07: Western Province
- 2005/06–2006/07: Cape Cobras
- 2006/07–2010/11: Dolphins
- 2009/10–2010/11: KwaZulu-Natal
- 2011/12–2015/16: Knights
- 2011/12–2015/16: Free State
- FC debut: 11 October 2002 Western Province v KwaZulu-Natal
- Last FC: 27 January 2008 Free State v Gauteng
- LA debut: 26 December 2001 Western Province v Northerns
- Last LA: 28 February 2016 Free State v Gauteng

Career statistics
| Competition | FC | LA | T20 |
|---|---|---|---|
| Matches | 117 | 89 | 44 |
| Runs scored | 1,819 | 319 | 61 |
| Batting average | 15.54 | 9.96 | 6.10 |
| 100s/50s | 0/6 | 0/1 | 0/0 |
| Top score | 78 | 51 | 23 |
| Balls bowled | 17,973 | 3,817 | 844 |
| Wickets | 366 | 108 | 31 |
| Bowling average | 25.00 | 28.73 | 30.93 |
| 5 wickets in innings | 12 | 0 | 1 |
| 10 wickets in match | 1 | 0 | 0 |
| Best bowling | 7/31 | 4/30 | 5/21 |
| Catches/stumpings | 45/– | 22/– | 7/– |
- Source: CricInfo, 20 May 2022

Quinton Friend (born 16 February 1982) is a South African former cricketer. He bowls right arm fast-medium with an action similar to Damien Fleming and is a tail-end right-handed batsman.

== Career ==
Friend, who was born in Bellville, Western Cape, debuted for the Warriors in 2002 in List A cricket, and in 2002 in first class cricket at Pietermaritzburg. He took career best figures of 3/36 against Western Province Boland in a one-day match on 17 November 2004, and the following year in January 2005 he took 5/93 in one day again against Western Province in a first class match, ending with final figures of 6/114. Against Western Province again Friend was the pick of the bowlers with 4/65 on 2 March 2006 during a one-day game,

In 2007, Western Provinces merged with Boland to become the Cape Cobras, who then released Friend on 12 July 2007 to join the Dolphins. He led them to victory against the Titans on 22 October 2007, however eight days later was suspended for one match along with Titans' Martin van Jaarsveld for verbal abuse.
