= Lyall Meyer =

South African cricketer (born 1982)

Lyall Meyer (born 23 March 1982) is a South African cricketer and hockey player.

Meyer was a fast bowler for the Warriors and Eastern Province cricket teams in South Africa from 2001 to 2013, taking 122 wickets in first-class cricket at an average of 32.78. He also represented South Africa at hockey against France in 2005.
