= Brian Jerling =

South African cricket umpire (born 1958)

Personal information
- Full name: Brian George Jerling
- Born: 13 August 1958 (age 68); Port Elizabeth, Cape Province, Union of South Africa
- Role: Umpire

Umpiring information
- Tests umpired: 4 (2006–2006)
- ODIs umpired: 94 (2000–2011)
- T20Is umpired: 13 (2005–2011)
- WODIs umpired: 15 (2000–2009)
- Source: ESPNcricinfo, 6 December 2013

Brian George Jerling (born 13 August 1958), is a South African Test, One Day International (ODI) and Twenty20 International umpire. He made his debut as an international umpire in an ODI game between South Africa and New Zealand in October 2000. He has since umpired in more than 90 ODI games. Jerling has been an umpire in four Test matches, all coming in 2006.

== International umpiring statistics ==
	First	Last	Total
Tests	West Indies v India at Basseterre, Jun 2006	New Zealand v Sri Lanka at Wellington, Dec 2006	4
ODIs	South Africa v New Zealand at Kimberley, Oct 2000	South Africa v India at Centurion, Jan 2011	94
T20s	South Africa v New Zealand at Johannesburg, Oct 2005	South Africa v India at Durban, Jan 2011	7

== See also ==
- List of Test cricket umpires
- List of One Day International cricket umpires
- List of Twenty20 International cricket umpires
