= Jon Kent (cricketer) =

South African cricketer (born 1979)

Personal information
- Full name: Jon Carter Kent
- Born: 7 May 1979 (age 47); Cape Town, Cape Province, South Africa
- Batting: Right-handed
- Bowling: Right-arm medium-fast

International information
- National side: South Africa
- ODI debut (cap 69): 3 April 2002 v Australia
- Last ODI: 6 April 2002 v Australia

Domestic team information
- Years: Team
- 1997/98–2009/10: KwaZulu-Natal
- 2003/04–2010/11: Dolphins
- 2011/12: Southern Rocks

Career statistics
Competition	ODI	FC	LA	T20
Matches	2	101	149
Runs scored	–	5,009	2,900	41
Batting average	–	35.77	28.43	366
100s/50s	–	9/26	1/20	0/0
Top score	–	178*	115*	46*
Balls bowled	48	10,715	5,382	474
Wickets	0	158	118	27
Bowling average	–	32.51	37.20	22.81
5 wickets in innings	–	1	0	0
10 wickets in match	–	0	0	0
Best bowling	–	6/77	4/29	4/25
Catches/stumpings	1/–	66/–	48/–	10/–
- Source: Cricinfo, 26 January 2025

Jon Carter Kent (born 7 May 1979) is a South African former cricketer who played in two One Day Internationals in 2002. He retired from senior cricket in 2011, after being released from his Dolphins cricket team contract.
