= Imraan Khan =

South African cricketer (born 1984)

Personal information
- Full name: Imraan Khan
- Born: 27 April 1984 (age 42); Durban, Natal Province, South Africa
- Batting: Left-handed
- Bowling: Right-arm off break
- Role: Batsman

International information
- National side: South Africa (2009)
- Only Test (cap 303): 19 March 2009 v Australia

Domestic team information
- Years: Team
- 2002/03–2012/13: KwaZulu-Natal
- 2003/04–2016/17: Dolphins (squad no. 11)
- 2013/14–2016/17: KwaZulu-Natal Inland

Career statistics
Competition	Test	FC	LA	T20
Matches	1	161	121	51
Runs scored	20	9,367	2,954	556
Batting average	20.00	36.58	28.67	14.25
100s/50s	0/0	20/49	3/21	0/1
Top score	20	195	114	50
Balls bowled	–	4,288	1,061	294
Wickets	–	62	20	17
Bowling average	–	40.56	44.45	21.76
5 wickets in innings	–	1	0	0
10 wickets in match	–	0	0	0
Best bowling	–	6/43	3/24	4/21
Catches/stumpings	1/–	69/–	28/–	20/–
- Source: CricketArchive, 15 July 2025

Imraan Khan (born 27 April 1984) is a former South African cricketer who played domestic cricket and captained the Dolphins. He also captained his country at under 19 level.

Khan made his international debut in the third Test of the home series against Australia in 2008/09. Khan opened the batting and went on to score 20 runs in South Africa's first innings. South Africa won the Test by an innings and secured a consolation win, after having lost the previous two Tests, and the three Test-match series. He was included in the KZN Inland squad for the 2015 Africa T20 Cup.
