= Stiaan van Zyl =

South African cricketer

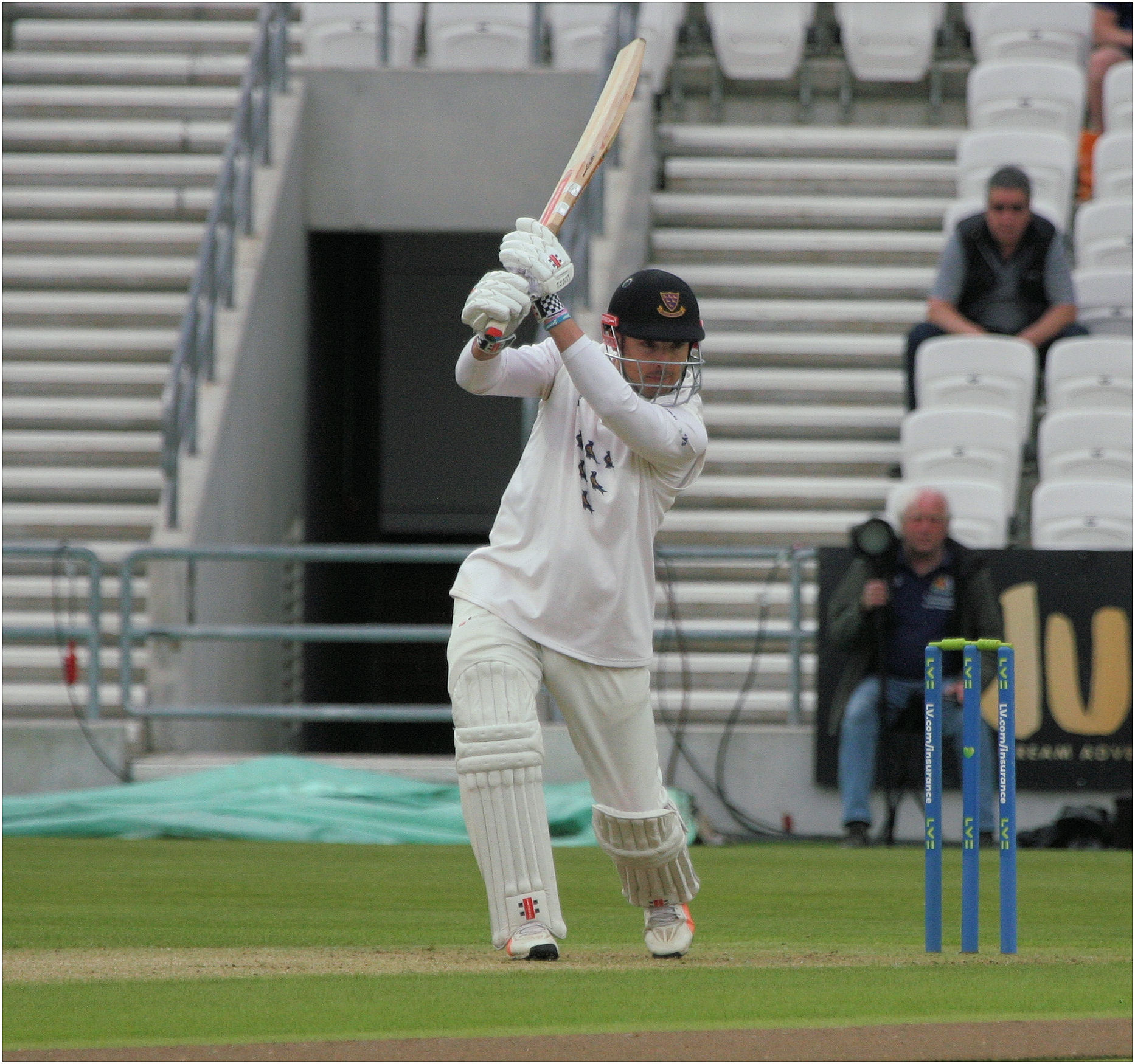
- Van Zyl batting for Sussex CCC in June 2021

Personal information
- Full name: Stiaan van Zyl
- Born: 19 September 1987 (age 39); Cape Town, Cape Province, South Africa
- Batting: Left-handed
- Bowling: Right-arm medium
- Role: Batting All-rounder

International information
- National side: South Africa (2014–2016)
- Test debut (cap 319): 17 December 2014 v West Indies
- Last Test: 27 August 2016 v New Zealand

Domestic team information
- Years: Team
- 2006/07–2010/11: Boland
- 2007/08–2017/18: Cape Cobras (squad no. 74)
- 2012/13–2016/17: Western Province
- 2017–2021: Sussex (squad no. 74)
- 2017/18: Chittagong Vikings
- 2019/20: Cumilla Warriors
- 2021/22–2023/24: Boland

Career statistics
Competition	Test	FC	LA	T20
Matches	12	200	130	73
Runs scored	395	12,519	3,797	1,509
Batting average	26.33	42.58	35.48	25.57
100s/50s	1/0	30/57	7/20	0/9
Top score	101*	228	114*	86*
Balls bowled	403	5,881	1,124	132
Wickets	6	72	21	7
Bowling average	24.66	36.98	46.80	27.28
5 wickets in innings	0	1	0	0
10 wickets in match	0	0	0	0
Best bowling	3/20	5/32	4/24	2/14
Catches/stumpings	6/–	114/–	35/–	21/–
- Source: ESPNcricinfo, 4 February 2024

Stiaan van Zyl (born 19 September 1987) is a South African cricketer who most recently played for Sussex County Cricket Club as a left-handed batsman who bowls right-arm medium pace.

Previously, he represented his national side before ending his career by signing Kolpak deal. He made his debut for Boland in the SAA Provincial Challenge against Kei. He usually opened in limited overs games when Graeme Smith or Robin Peterson were absent.

He made his Test match debut for South Africa against the West Indies on 17 December 2014 at SuperSport Park in Centurion, scoring a century. He became the 100th batsman to score a century on debut in Test cricket.

In April 2021, he was named in Boland's squad, ahead of the 2021–22 cricket season in South Africa.

== See also ==
- List of Test cricket centuries scored on debut
