= Victor Mpitsang =

South African cricketer

Personal information
- Born: 28 March 1980 (age 46); Kimberley, Northern Cape, South Africa
- Batting: Right-handed
- Bowling: Right-arm fast-medium
- Role: Bowler

International information
- National side: South Africa
- ODI debut (cap 55): 5 February 1999 v West Indies
- Last ODI: 30 September 1999 v Kenya

Domestic team information
- Years: Team
- 1997/98–2003/04: Free State
- 2004/05-: Eagles

Career statistics
Competition	ODI	FC	LA	T20
Matches	2	103	100	23
Runs scored	1	417	59	2
Batting average	–	5.87	5.36	3.00
100s/50s	0/0	0/0	0/0	0/0
Top score	1*	23	20*	3
Balls bowled	60	15,993	4,040	354
Wickets	2	245	88	15
Bowling average	31.50	29.86	35.11	29.73
5 wickets in innings	0	4	0	0
10 wickets in match	0	0	0	0
Best bowling	2/49	6/30	5/44	3/19
Catches/stumpings	0/–	17/–	5/–	4/–
- Source: CricketArchive, 26 March 2014

Phenyo Victor Mpitsang (born 28 March 1980) is a South African former cricketer. A fast bowler, he played two One Day Internationals for South Africa in 1999. He represented Free State and subsequently the Eagles franchise. On 20 October 2020, Cricket South Africa (CSA) announced his appointment as the new National Convenor of Selectors, a full-time appointment commencing on 2 November 2020.

== Early years ==
Mpitsang was born in Schweizer-Reneke, and was spotted as a youngster by Corrie van Zyl. A bursary was arranged for him as part of the UCB's development programme, enabling him to be educated at Grey College, Bloemfontein.

He played in three under-19 Test matches and eight under-19 ODIs in 1997 and 1998. He was a member of the South African squad for the 1998 Under-19 World Cup, taking seven wickets in five appearances at an average of 26.57, with best figures of 3/27 against India. His first-class debut for Free State came in the 1997–98 SuperSport Series when he was selected for the fixture against Border in East London.

== International cricket ==
In January 1999, Mpitsang was named in the senior South African squad for the tour of New Zealand. According to Ray White, president of the UCB at the time, this decision was taken to "broaden his cricket experience and give him the benefit of touring with the national team". Following the announcement of the squad for New Zealand, he was given his senior debut in an ODI against the West Indies at Springbok Park, Bloemfontein. He opened the bowling and took 2/49, dismissing Nixon McLean and Daren Ganga with consecutive deliveries. He remains the youngest ODI debutant for South Africa at the age of 18 years and 314 days.

He did not feature in the international fixtures on the New Zealand tour, although he did play in the games against Northern Districts and New Zealand A. His next international opportunity came during the LG Cup in Kenya later in 1999, when he played against the host nation in Nairobi. He failed to take a wicket in his three overs on that occasion.

He has not been selected for the national side since then, although he has appeared for South Africa A against Sri Lanka A in 1999–2000 and also on a tour of the West Indies in 2000–01.

== Domestic cricket ==
The 2000–01 season saw Mpitsang record both his best first-class bowling figures (5/24 against North West in Bloemfontein) and his highest first-class innings (23 against Western Province in Cape Town). He took a total of 33 first-class wickets during the course of that 2000–01 domestic season, a tally which he equalled in 2007–08.

In 2005–06, he was a member of the Eagles side that defeated the Cape Cobras in the final of the Standard Bank Pro20 series.

During the 2008 English season, he appeared as an overseas professional for Knypersley CC in Staffordshire.

== Other achievements ==
Mpitsang has also played basketball for Free State.
