= Ahmed Amla =

South African cricketer (born 1979)

Personal information
- Full name: Ahmed Mahomed Amla
- Born: 15 September 1979 (age 47); Durban, Natal, South Africa
- Height: 1.86 m (6 ft 1 in)
- Batting: Right-handed
- Bowling: Right-arm medium
- Role: Batsman
- Relatives: Hashim Amla (brother)

Domestic team information
- Years: Team
- 1999–2013: KwaZulu Natal Dolphins (squad no. 99)
- 1999–2013: KwaZulu-Natal
- 1997/98: Natal B
- 1998/99: KwaZulu-Natal B

Career statistics
Competition	FC	LA	T20
Matches	128	127	53
Runs scored	6,587	3,147	801
Batting average	34.30	31.15	22.25
100s/50s	13/33	2/24	-/1
Top score	164*	107*	52*
Balls bowled	849	204	162
Wickets	8	6	8
Bowling average	68.50	36.66	33.75
5 wickets in innings	–	–	0
10 wickets in match	–	n/a	0
Best bowling	2/53	1/8	2/30
Catches/stumpings	67/–	37/–	14/–
- Source: ESPNcricinfo, 23 February, 2016

Ahmad Mahomed Amla (born 15 September 1979) is a South African former cricketer.

He played domestic cricket for the Dolphins. A right-handed batsman, he made his first-class debut as a teenager in 1997/98. His brother, Hashim Amla, played Test and ODI cricket for South Africa.

In April 2013, it was announced that Amla was retiring from all forms of cricket. He planned to focus on his studies towards a business degree and to pursue business interests.

== Playing career ==
Amla made his first-class debut in 1997 for Natal B. He was picked in the South Africa Academy that toured Namibia and was also selected for the South African under-19 team. He established himself as a regular in the Kwa-Zulu Natal provincial team and when franchise cricket took off, he played for the Dolphins - with his brother for a time, and captained the side from 2006 to 2009, becoming the second Amla to do so after Hashim captained the side in 2004.

== Coaching career ==
From at least 2011 to 2013, Amla took on coaching roles with the Mozambique national team, initially as a consultant and then as senior coach.
