= Ryan Canning =

South African cricketer (born 1984)

Personal information
- Full name: Ryan Clement Cavanagh Canning
- Born: 22 February 1984 (age 42); Cape Town, South Africa
- Batting: Right-handed
- Role: Wicket-keeper

Domestic team information
- Years: Team
- 2004/05–2011/12: Western Province
- 2005/06–2010/11: Cape Cobras (squad no. 7)
- 2012/13–2013/14: Boland
- FC debut: 21 October 2001 Western Province v Eastern Province
- Last FC: 13 February 2014 Boland v Border
- LA debut: 24 October 2004 Western Province v Eastern Province
- Last LA: 22 December 2013 Western Province v Free State

Career statistics
Competition	FC	LA	T20
Matches	105	68	35
Runs scored	5,084	1,521	475
Batting average	37.38	32.36	25.00
100s/50s	9/29	0/10	0/2
Top score	122	81*	56
Catches/stumpings	318/27	75/14	19/9
- Source: , 14 February 2023

Ryan Canning (born 22 February 1984) is a South African former cricketer. He played for Western Province and Boland as a wicket-keeper-batsman.

== Biography ==
Canning grew up in Edgemead, Cape Town, and played cricket for Pinelands Cricket Club. He was signed by Cape Cobras as a prospect. He featured in a few games in the Supersport series in October 2010, and scored a half-century against the Highveld Lions. At the end of the 2009 season, the Cobras signed Dane Vilas – another wicket-keeper batsman – and Canning was released from his contract.
