= Francois Plaatjies =

South African cricketer

Personal information
- Full name: Francois Chessley Plaatjies
- Born: 26 August 1986 (age 40); Oudtshoorn, South Africa
- Batting: Right-handed
- Bowling: Right arm fast

Domestic team information
- Years: Team
- 2007/08-present: Western Province
- 2008/09-present: Cape Cobras
- Source: Cricinfo

Francois Chessley Plaatjies (born 26 August 1986) is a South African cricketer who plays for the Cape Cobras.

== Domestic career ==
A talented fast bowler, who can bowl over 95 mph, and genuine tail-ender, Plaatjies made his first-class debut for Western Province against Boland in 2007, but did not take a wicket. However, Plaatjies found success briefly after that leading to a contract with the Cape Cobras team in the 2008/09 season. Plaatjies also participated in the 2009 Champions League Twenty20 albeit only in one match (which turned out to be his T20 debut), where he bowled four economical overs for only thirteen runs against the Delhi Daredevils.

== South African "A" team call-up and injury ==
Plaatjies' pace and wicket-taking ability lead to a call-up the South Africa A cricket team who were to tour Sri Lanka in 2010. Unfortunately, Plaatjies had to withdraw from the tour nursing a groin injury which led to a one and a half season absence from professional cricket. Plaatjies' return to cricket during the latter part of 2011 was unsuccessful taking no wickets. However, at the age of 26, Plaatjies has a bright future ahead of him if he can attain his successful form he once had.
