= Justin Kreusch =

South African cricketer (born 1979)

Justin Peter Kreusch (born 27 September 1979 in East London) is a South African first class cricketer for Border. A hard hitting right-handed batsman, Kreusch was named captain of Border when he was aged just 23, in 2003–04. He had previously captained the Border B team.

In March 2006 he took 5 for 31 against the Cape Cobras at Stellenbosch. This effort included a hattrick and 4 wickets in 5 balls.
