= Thandi Tshabalala =

South African cricketer (born 1984)

Personal information
- Full name: Mthandeki Samson Tshabalala
- Born: 19 November 1984 (age 41); Welkom, Orange Free State, South Africa
- Batting: Right-handed
- Bowling: Right-arm offbreak
- Role: Bowler

International information
- National side: South Africa
- ODI debut (cap 87): 24 June 2007 v Ireland
- Last ODI: 26 August 2007 v Zimbabwe
- Source: Cricinfo, 19 December 2013

Thandi Tshabalala (born 19 November 1984) is a South African cricketer who plays first-class cricket for the Eagles as a specialist off spinner. He was first called up to the South African team in February 2006, as he made the squad for their Twenty20 International against Australia, but did not play. In July, he was again selected, this time in a 14-man squad to tour Sri Lanka, but was not picked for the final eleven in the first Test. UCBSA chief of selectors, Haroon Lorgat, said it was "very unlikely that he [would] play in the first Test." and that he was there to "gain exposure and experience."

Tshabalala has won two Man of the Match awards in his 52 official matches for Eagles and Free State, both in limited overs games. The first was in the opening match of the 2004–05 Pro20 series, where the Eagles beat the Dolphins by 70 runs and Tshabalala took two wickets, both bowled, and ran out Hashim Amla; the second was in the final Standard Bank Cup game of the 2005–06 season, where Tshabalala took four for 24 in nine overs as the Eagles defended 225. The Eagles made it through to the knock-outs, and won the tournament, with Tshabalala providing a similarly economical spell (9–0–24–2) in the final, where the Eagles beat the Titans after bowling them out for 142 in 42.3 overs.
