= Pierre Joubert (cricketer) =

South African cricketer (born 1978)

Personal information
- Born: 2 May 1978 (age 48); Pretoria, Transvaal, South Africa
- Batting: Right-handed
- Bowling: Right arm fast-medium
- Role: All rounder

Domestic team information
- Years: Team
- 1996/97–2010/11: Northern Transvaal/Northerns
- 2003: Suffolk
- 2006/07–2010/11: Titans
- FC debut: 27 October 1995 Northern Transvaal B v Transvaal B
- Last FC: 31 March 2011 Titans v Knights
- LA debut: 6 November 1996 Northern Transvaal v North West
- Last LA: 21 November 2010 Northerns v Easterns

Career statistics
Competition	FC	LA	T20
Matches	96	107	25
Runs scored	2,633	996	139
Batting average	27.42	26.91	23.16
100s/50s	1/16	0/5	0/0
Top score	112*	87*	26*
Balls bowled	14,472	4,599	346
Wickets	250	119	18
Bowling average	23.06	27.88	27.27
5 wickets in innings	10	0	0
10 wickets in match	2	0	0
Best bowling	7/32	4/82	3/12
Catches/stumpings	56/–	33/–	9/–
- Source: CricketArchive, 18 November 2017

Pierre Joubert (born 2 May 1978 in Pretoria) was a South African cricketer for Northerns and the Titans, captaining the Titans between 2008 and 2010.

A right arm medium-fast bowler, Joubert represented South Africa Schools in 1994/95. He made his first class debut in 1995/96 for Northerns as well as captaining the Titans successfully. A handy lower-order right-handed batsman, he has passed 50 on 10 occasions and converted one of them into a century. Joubert has since retired from professional cricket as of 2012.
