= Richard Levi =

English-South African cricketer (born 1988)

Richard Ernst Levi
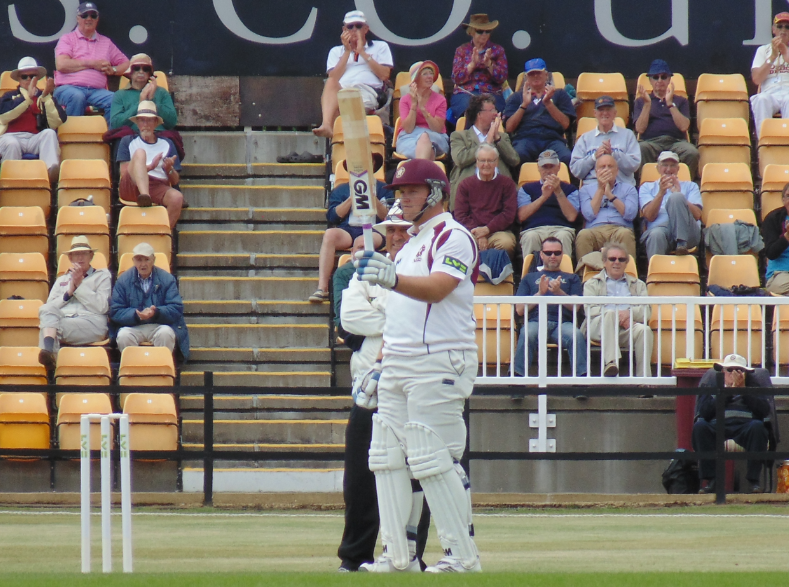

Personal information
- Full name: Richard Ernst Levi
- Born: 14 January 1988 (age 38); Johannesburg, Transvaal Province, South Africa
- Batting: Right-handed
- Bowling: Right-arm medium
- Role: Batsman

International information
- National side: South Africa
- T20I debut (cap 48): 17 February 2012 v New Zealand
- Last T20I: 23 December 2012 v New Zealand
- T20I shirt no.: 88

Domestic team information
- Years: Team
- 2005–2022: Western Province
- 2005–2018: Cape Cobras (squad no. 88)
- 2012: Mumbai Indians
- 2012: Somerset
- 2013–2021: Northamptonshire
- 2017: Sylhet Sixers

Career statistics
Competition	T20I	FC	LA	T20
Matches	13	106	147	226
Runs scored	236	5,722	4,714	5,606
Batting average	21.45	36.21	35.71	27.48
100s/50s	1/1	10/32	8/30	3/35
Top score	117*	168	166	117*
Catches/stumpings	4/–	89/–	45/–	60/–
- Source: ESPNcricinfo, 19 June 2025

Richard Ernst Levi (born 14 January 1988) is a former English-South African cricketer. He played in the 2006 U-19 Cricket World Cup in Sri Lanka. He played for Western Province, Cape Cobras and Northamptonshire. He attended Wynberg Boys' High school in Cape Town and received honours for cricket in 2005.

Levi holds a British passport.

== International career ==
During 2012, Levi played 13 international Twenty20 matches for South Africa. He had the highest score of 117*, in his second match, against New Zealand at Seddon Park in Hamilton. He held the record for the most runs scored in a Twenty20 international innings tied with Chris Gayle. This was surpassed by Brendon McCullum on 21 September 2012 when he scored 123 against Bangladesh at Palakelle, Sri Lanka. He was also the only batsman to score a T20I century at Seddon Park.

Levi has since struggled in International cricket, partly due to being a predominantly leg-side batsman and weak against spin bowling and dropped from the South Africa squad.

== Overseas cricket ==
Also during 2012, he played for Mumbai Indians in the IPL. He was reportedly signed for $400,000.

Later the same year, he played for Somerset, in the Friends Life Twenty20 competition, reaching the semifinal. For 2013, he signed for Northants for Twenty20 matches, and had great success. In 13 matches, he scored 360 runs, including a century and two fifties. Once again he reached the finals day, and scored 57 off just 35 balls in the semifinal victory over Essex, and also played in the victory over Surrey in the final. The following season, he returned to Northants, with the intention of playing in both twenty and fifty over matches, but following a number of injuries to the Northants squad he also played four first-class matches.

For 2015 and 2016, he played all forms of cricket for Northants. He returned to Twenty20 finals day in both of these seasons. In 2015 he scored 63 off 46 balls against Warwickshire in the semifinal, but finished on the losing side in the final. In 2016, he was once more on the winning team, beating Durham in the final.
