= Yusuf Abdulla =

South African cricketer

Personal information
- Full name: Yusuf Adam Abdulla
- Born: 17 January 1983 (age 43); Johannesburg, Transvaal Province, South Africa
- Batting: Left-handed
- Bowling: Left arm fast-medium

International information
- National side: South Africa
- T20I debut (cap 40): 29 March 2009 v Australia
- Last T20I: 15 November 2009 v England

Domestic team information
- Years: Team
- 2005/06–2010/11: KwaZulu-Natal
- 2005/06–2013/14: Dolphins (squad no. 24)
- 2009: Kings XI Punjab (squad no. 24)
- 2012/13–2016/17: KwaZulu-Natal Inland

Career statistics
Competition	T20I	FC	LA	T20
Matches	2	26	74	55
Runs scored	–	236	104	26
Batting average	–	10.72	11.55	8.66
100s/50s	–	0/1	0/0	0/0
Top score	–	54	31*	16*
Balls bowled	42	3,635	3,062	1,187
Wickets	2	61	89	63
Bowling average	22.00	35.27	27.40	19.80
5 wickets in innings	0	2	1	0
10 wickets in match	0	0	0	0
Best bowling	1/16	5/62	5/33	4/31
Catches/stumpings	0/–	7/–	15/–	6/–
- Source: ESPNcricinfo, 14 July 2025

Yusuf Adam Abdulla (born 17 January 1983) is a retired South African cricketer. He played first-class cricket for the Dolphins and had previously represented the KwaZulu-Natal, South Africa A and the Rest of South Africa. A Left-arm fast-medium bowler, Abdulla was named in the Emerging Players squad to take part in the 4 Nations tournament in 2007 and played in the following years competition as well. He was currently one of South Africa's leading domestic-competition bowlers.

He made his international debut against Australia in the second Twenty20 International at Supersport Park on 29 March 2009, he took 1/16 from three overs; his first international wicket was Ricky Ponting. He was subsequently added to the Kings XI Punjab's Indian Premier League squad following an injury to Jerome Taylor.

== Early life ==
Yusuf Abdulla belongs to a Muslim family and was raised in Lenasia, a suburb located in the South of Johannesburg. He played for his high school in Gauteng before his family shifted to Dundee in KwaZulu Natal. He was picked by Yashin Ebrahim of the KZN academy to be trained directly under him. And after giving a solid performance in the 2006–07 season in the Pro-20 in which he got 9 wickets at an average of 12.0 he was selected for the High Performance Centre in Pretoria as one of the 20 amateurs to train at the National Academy. He is of Indian origin as his mother is from the city of Surat, Gujarat, India.

== Domestic career ==
Yusuf Abdulla made his domestic debut for KwaZulu-Natal against Border on 16 February 2006 at Durban just after his return from The National Academy in the 2007–08 Season. Abdulla impressed with his performance for the Dolphins in the Pro 20 with a tally of 10 wickets at an average of 13.

== International career ==
Yusuf Abdulla got his international call on 29 March 2009 when he was included in the 20–20 side to play against Australia at Centurion. Other than that Yusuf Abdulla played just one more international game and took only 2 International wickets for South Africa. Abdulla was also the part of the South Africa's 2009 T20 World Cup Squad but did not get a chance.

== IPL career ==
In the 2009 IPL Abdulla was signed up as a replacement player. Yusuf's performances in the first half of the 2009 season created quite a sensation and gave his career a temporary boost. He ended the tournament with 14 wickets at an average of 17.21. In the following season Kings XI Punjab gave him a contract of $50,000.

== Retirement ==
Abdulla retired during the 2010/11 season citing injury. Abdulla had lost his domestic contract after injury and had no swing or pace.
