= Charl Langeveldt =

South African cricketer

Personal information
- Full name: Charl Kenneth Langeveldt
- Born: 17 December 1974 (age 51); Stellenbosch, South Africa
- Height: 5 ft 10 in (1.78 m)
- Batting: Right-handed
- Bowling: Right-arm fast-medium
- Role: Bowler

International information
- National side: South Africa (2001–2010)
- Test debut (cap 298): 2 January 2005 v England
- Last Test: 2 January 2006 v Australia
- ODI debut (cap 67): 14 October 2001 v Kenya
- Last ODI: 31 October 2010 v Pakistan
- ODI shirt no.: 67
- T20I debut (cap 6): 21 October 2005 v New Zealand
- Last T20I: 19 May 2010 v West Indies
- T20I shirt no.: 67

Domestic team information
- Years: Team
- 1997/98–2013/14: Boland
- 2003/04: Border
- 2004/05–2006/07: Highveld Lions
- 2005: Somerset
- 2007: Leicestershire
- 2007/08–2011/12: Cape Cobras
- 2008: Derbyshire
- 2009–2010: Kolkata Knight Riders
- 2011: Royal Challengers Bangalore
- 2011: Kent

Career statistics
Competition	Test	ODI	FC	LA
Matches	6	72	104	233
Runs scored	16	73	1,219	444
Batting average	8.00	6.63	14.34	8.70
100s/50s	0/0	0/0	0/1	0/0
Top score	10	12	56	33*
Balls bowled	999	3,489	19,533	11,043
Wickets	16	100	334	359
Bowling average	37.06	29.62	28.87	23.83
5 wickets in innings	1	2	9	8
10 wickets in match	0	0	1	0
Best bowling	5/46	5/39	6/48	5/7
Catches/stumpings	2/–	11/–	31/–	38/–
- Source: ESPNcricinfo, 12 December 2016

Charl Kenneth Langeveldt (born 17 December 1974) is a South African cricket coach and former cricketer who is currently a bowling coach with the Zimbabwe national cricket team.

As a cricket player, he played all formats of the game. A right-arm fast-medium bowler, he played for South Africa between 2001 and 2010, primarily in One Day Internationals. Langeveldt was the first South African to take a hat-trick in the ODI format. He was the bowling coach for the national team.

== Domestic career ==
Langeveldt was born at Stellenbosch in Cape Province and worked as a warder at the Drakenstein Correctional Centre before pursuing his career in cricket. In 2005, Langeveldt was Morecambe Cricket Club's professional player; he later returned to the Northern Premier League for the 2007 season with Netherfield Cricket Club.

In 2008, Langeveldt joined Derbyshire as a Kolpak player, before playing for Kent as an overseas player in the 2011 Friends Life t20. Langeveldt also played for the Bangalore Royal Challengers in the Indian Premier League (IPL).

== International career ==
He made his Test debut in January 2005 against England at his home ground of Cape Town and took 5 for 46 in the first innings. His ODI debut came much earlier, in October 2001 against Kenya at Kimberley, where he took two wickets. He was rewarded with 4 for 21 in the following game at Newlands. Included in South Africa's 2003 World Cup squad, he played in only one game which was in the pool stage against Kenya.

In 2005, in the 3rd ODI against the West Indies at Barbados, he took a hat-trick in the last over as South Africa won the match by 1 run. He bowled Ian Bradshaw and Daren Powell before getting Corey Collymore LBW to seal the victory. It was the first ever ODI hat-trick by a South African.

In 2007 he played in his second Cricket World Cup and after taking 5/39 in their win against Sri Lanka he became just the third South African to take a World Cup 5 wicket haul, which was also the first 5 wicket haul of the 2007 World Cup.

In early 2008, Langeveldt was controversially selected in the Test team for South Africa's tour of India at the expense of the white paceman André Nel. This was widely believed to be due to an order from Cricket South Africa to select more non-white players in the team as part of its transformation policy, rather than performance. Citing the controversy, Langeveldt declined to join the team.

== Coaching career ==
Langeveldt has had two spells as South Africa's bowling coach. The first ran from June 2015 to October 2017, when Ottis Gibson took over the role. Langeveldt was appointed as the bowling coach of Bangladesh national cricket team in July 2019, but moved back to a coaching role with South Africa in December 2019.

== See also ==
- List of South Africa cricketers who have taken five-wicket hauls on Test debut
