= Claude Henderson =

South African cricketer

Personal information
- Full name: Claude William Henderson
- Born: 14 June 1972 (age 54); Worcester, Cape Province, South Africa
- Batting: Right-handed
- Bowling: Slow left arm orthodox

International information
- National side: South Africa (2001–2002)
- Test debut (cap 45): 7 September 2001 v Zimbabwe
- Last Test: 25 October 2002 v Bangladesh
- ODI debut (cap 66): 23 September 2001 v Zimbabwe
- Last ODI: 7 October 2001 v Kenya

Domestic team information
- Years: Team
- 1990/91–1997/98: Boland
- 1998/99–2003/04: Western Province
- 2004–2013: Leicestershire (squad no. 15)
- 2006/07–2007/08: Lions
- 2008/09–2010/11: Cape Cobras

Career statistics
Competition	Test	ODI	FC	LA
Matches	7	4	273	257
Runs scored	65	–	5,637	1,203
Batting average	9.28	–	18.91	14.85
100s/50s	0/0	–	0/20	0/0
Top score	30	–	81	45
Balls bowled	1962	217	65,089	11,384
Wickets	22	7	905	319
Bowling average	42.18	18.85	30.76	26.09
5 wickets in innings	0	0	34	2
10 wickets in match	0	0	2	0
Best bowling	4/116	4/17	7/57	6/29
Catches/stumpings	2/–	0/–	88/–	57/–
- Source: Cricinfo, 16 June 2013

Claude William Henderson (born 14 June 1972) is a South African former cricketer who bowled left-arm spin and played in seven Test matches and four One Day Internationals in 2001 to 2002.

== Domestic cricket ==
Henderson played domestically for Boland and Western Province before joining Leicestershire in 2004, Henderson became the first Kolpak registered player in the County Championship, which allows certain players without a British passport, to play in England without counting as an overseas player under the restrictions on overseas players.

In June 2006, against Surrey, Henderson recorded an innings analysis of three wickets for 235 runs from 54 overs and 2 ball, the most expensive innings figures in the history of the County Championship.

Henderson was in fine form for the Lions cricket team in the 2006–07 SuperSport Series. He was the 5th leading wicket taker in the competition with 34 wickets at an average of 24 He has had a disappointing 2007 season with Leicestershire though.

In 2008, he joined Cape Cobras and after consistent performances, he gained a place in the Cobras squad for the inaugural Champions League Twenty20 competition in India in 2009.

2011 marked Henderson's testimonial year at Leicestershire. Despite this, he was also Leicester's leading wicket taker in the County Championship and was a significant contributor in the Foxes 2011 Friends Life t20 cup win, where his 4 over spell in the final against Somerset conceded just 11 runs. He was rewarded with a new contract at the end of the season.

Henderson announced that he would be retiring from first class cricket at the end of the 2013 season at the age of 41. He plans to return to South Africa, where he will become a television pundit and coach. His last game turned out to be the County Championship match at the end of April 2013 against Gloucestershire, where his final victim was Benny Howell.

== International cricket ==
Henderson had to wait until 2001 to make his international debut after Nicky Boje needed surgery. He was selected to make his test debut against neighbours Zimbabwe in Harare. Following the retirement of Boje from the South African test side, Henderson was approached to replace him for the home series against India. Henderson rejected the approach because of his contract with Leicestershire, only willing to play for South Africa if he was given a contract with the South African cricket board.

== Coaching career ==
On 5 October 2021, Henderson was announced as director of cricket at Leicestershire County Cricket Club.

== Career-best performances ==
	Batting				Bowling (innings)			
	Score	Fixture	Venue	Season	Figures	Fixture	Venue	Season
Test	30	South Africa v Australia	Adelaide	2001	4/116	South Africa v Australia	Adelaide	2001
ODI					4/17	South Africa v Zimbabwe	Harare	2001
FC	81	Leicestershire v Gloucestershire	Leicester	2007	7/57	Boland v Eastern Province	Paarl	1994
LA	45	Lions v Eagles	Johannesburg	2006	6/29	Boland v Easterns	Paarl	1997
T20	32	Leicestershire v Northamptonshire	Northampton	2010	3/23	Cape Cobras v Dolphins	Durban	2009
