= Ryan Bailey (cricketer) =

South African cricketer (born 1982)

Ryan Tyrone Bailey (born 8 September 1982, in Western Province) is a South African first class cricketer for North West. A right-handed batsman, Bailey has previously represented South Africa Under-19s.

Current Head Coach of Stellenbosch University (Maties) Cricket Club.
