= Rusty Theron =

American cricketer (born 1985)

Personal information
- Full name: Juan Theron
- Born: 24 July 1985 (age 41); Potchefstroom, South Africa
- Nickname: Rusty
- Batting: Right-handed
- Bowling: Right arm fast-medium
- Role: Bowler

International information
- National sides: South Africa (2010–2012); United States (2019–2022)
- ODI debut (cap 100/27): 15 October 2010; South Africa v Zimbabwe
- Last ODI: 12 June 2022; United States v Oman
- T20I debut (cap 47/19): 8 October 2010; South Africa v Zimbabwe
- Last T20I: 17 July 2022; United States v PNG

Domestic team information
- Years: Team
- 2005–2015: Eastern Province
- 2007–2015: Warriors
- 2010: Kings XI Punjab
- 2012: Deccan Chargers
- 2012: Sussex
- 2014–2015: Jamaica Tallawahs
- 2015: Rajasthan Royals
- 2023–present: Texas Super Kings

Career statistics
Competition	ODI	T20I	FC	LA
Matches	18	18	54	114
Runs scored	50	41	783	686
Batting average	5.00	–	12.23	15.95
100s/50s	0/0	0/0	0/2	0/1
Top score	12	31*	66	53
Balls bowled	780	374	9,149	5,074
Wickets	31	24	169	186
Bowling average	21.51	19.87	27.02	23.49
5 wickets in innings	1	0	7	1
10 wickets in match	0	0	0	0
Best bowling	5/44	4/27	7/46	5/44
Catches/stumpings	7/–	3/–	16/–	33/–
- Source: ESPNcricinfo, 3 March 2024

Juan "Rusty" Theron (born 24 July 1985) is a South African-American professional cricketer. He played for the Warriors cricket team in South African domestic cricket and Rajasthan Royals in the Indian Premier League and for the South Africa national team. He is a right-arm fast bowler and bats right-handed. He retired from South African domestic cricket on 8 October 2015, following a spate of knee injuries. In 2019, he qualified to represent the United States cricket team in international matches, after fulfilling the International Cricket Council's three-year residency rule. He represented the United States in a One Day International (ODI) match in September 2019. He is known as "Rusty," due to the reddish-brown color of his hair.

== Playing career ==
Theron made his debut for Eastern Province in October 2005, appearing in a List A match at Port Elizabeth against the Zimbabwe U-23 team, bowling them out for 145 and thus helping his team win the fixture with match figures of 2/26 of 6.3 overs. He soon made his first class debut in November 2005, appearing against KwaZulu Natal. He soon showed his potential and developed into an important member of the Warriors side, leading the team in subsequent bowling charts in both first-class and List A competitions.

=== Early career ===
In 2008, Theron's performances for Warriors led to him being awarded the MTN Domestic Championship Cricketer of the Year award in Cricket South Africa's 2008 Mutual Federal SA Cricket Awards. Also during the same year, he played English club cricket for Staffordshire-based club Audley, where he replaced fellow South African Alfonso Thomas. He also represented the South Africa A side during the same year.

=== International debut (2010) ===
Theron's strong domestic performances in all competitions, notably during the Standard Bank Pro20 series, led to him being awarded both a place in South Africa's 18-man provisional 2010 ICC World Twenty20 squad, a national contract and signing with Indian Premier League team Kings XI Punjab. In his debut for Punjab against the Chennai Super Kings, he recorded figures of 2/17 in his four overs and bowled the Super Over that led his team to victory, subsequently being awarded with the Man of the Match award. He played in the two T20 Internationals against Zimbabwe and during the ODI series he took his first ODI wicket that of opener Hamilton Masakadza. He took 11 wickets in the three-match ODI series against Zimbabwe including a five-wicket haul.

He was then selected for the two match twenty-20 series against Pakistan but not the ODI series. He took four wickets in the two match series and was subsequently added to the squad for the ODI series against Pakistan. Theron was picked up by Deccan Chargers for IPL for the season of 2011.

Theron (31 off 16) and Wayne Parnell (29 off 11) helped South Africa win the second T20I against Australia, from a score of 84/7.

=== Indian Premier League (IPL) ===
Theron was acquired by the Deccan Chargers in 2011 IPL Auction. He remained for the Deccan Chargers until 2012. When the team was transitioned to Sunrisers Hyderabad in IPL, Theron along with other players was released from the franchise. He was in 2013's IPL Auction but was not bought by any franchises. In 2015, Theron was picked up by Rajasthan Royals to Play for IPL 8.

=== Move to America (2019) ===
In June 2019, Theron was named in a 30-man training squad for the United States cricket team, ahead of the Regional Finals of the 2018–19 ICC T20 World Cup Americas Qualifier tournament in Bermuda. The following month, he was one of twelve players to sign a three-month central contract with USA Cricket. In September 2019, he was named in United States's One Day International (ODI) squad for the 2019 United States Tri-Nation Series. On 13 September 2019, he made his ODI debut for the United States against Papua New Guinea, after previously playing 4 ODIs for South Africa, becoming the 13th cricketer to represent two international teams in ODIs.

In November 2019, he was named in the United States' squad for the 2019–20 Regional Super50 tournament. In June 2021, he was selected to take part in the Minor League Cricket tournament in the United States following the players' draft.

In October 2021, he was named in the American squad for the 2021 ICC Men's T20 World Cup Americas Qualifier tournament in Antigua. He made his T20I debut on 7 November 2021, for the United States against Belize, becoming the thirteenth cricketer to represent two international teams in T20Is.

In March 2023, he was roped into the Texas Super Kings' squad in the inaugural Major League Cricket Draft.
