= South African cricket team in India in 2009–10 =

International cricket tour

	India	South Africa
- Dates: 2 February 2010 – 27 February 2010
Captains	MS Dhoni	GC Smith(Tests); JH Kallis (ODIs)

Test series
- Result: 2-match series drawn 1–1
Most runs	V Sehwag (290)	HM Amla (494)
Most wickets	H Singh (10)	DW Steyn (11)
- Player of the series: HM Amla (SA)

One Day International series
- Results: India won the 3-match series 2–1
Most runs	Sachin Tendulkar (204)	AB de Villiers (241)
Most wickets	RA Jadeja (5); S Sreesanth (5)	LL Tsotsobe (3); JH Kallis (3); RE van der Merwe (3); WD Parnell (3); DW Steyn (3)
- Player of the series: Sachin Tendulkar (Ind)

The South Africa national cricket team toured India for a two-match Test series, and a three-match One Day International (ODI) series in February 2010.

== Squads ==
South Africa
Batsmen: Graeme Smith (captain); Hashim Amla; Loots Bosman; AB de Villiers; JP Duminy; Herschelle Gibbs; Alviro Petersen; Ashwell Prince; All-rounders: Johan Botha; Jacques Kallis; Ryan McLaren; Albie Morkel	Wicket-keepers: Mark Boucher; Bowlers: Paul Harris; Roelof van der Merwe; Morné Morkel; Wayne Parnell; Dale Steyn; Lonwabo Tsotsobe

India
Batsmen: Subramaniam Badrinath; Gautam Gambhir; VVS Laxman; Virender Sehwag; Sachin Tendulkar; Murali Vijay	Wicket-keepers: MS Dhoni (captain); Wriddhiman Saha; Bowlers: Zaheer Khan; Amit Mishra; Abhimanyu Mithun; Pragyan Ojha; Ishant Sharma; Harbhajan Singh; Sudeep Tyagi

== Tour matches ==
=== 2-day: Board President's XI v South Africans ===
2–3 February 2010
Scorecard

Board President's XI	v	South Africans
318 (74.4 overs); Abhishek Nayar 100 (140); Morné Morkel 3/24 (7.4 overs)		354 (82 overs); Hashim Amla 72 (122); Piyush Chawla 4/88 (18 overs)

Match drawn
Vidarbha Cricket Association Stadium, Nagpur
Umpires: Sudhir Asnani and Ulhas Gandhe

== Test series ==
=== 1st Test ===
6–10 February
Scorecard

South Africa	v	India
558/6d (176 overs); HM Amla 253* (473); Z Khan 4/96 [31]		233 (64.4 overs); V Sehwag 109 (139); DW Steyn 7/51 [16.4]
		319 (107.1 overs) (f/o); SR Tendulkar 100 (179); DW Steyn 3/57 [18.1]

South Africa won by an innings and 6 runs
Vidarbha Cricket Association Stadium, Jamtha, Nagpur
Umpires: SJ Davis (Aus) and IJ Gould (Eng)
Player of the match: HM Amla (SA)

- South Africa won the toss and elected to bat
- Subramaniam Badrinath and Wriddhiman Saha made Test cricket debuts for Indian cricket team.
- Hashim Amla accumulated the highest Test score by a South African in India by scoring in 253* runs.
- This was India's first Test defeat under the leadership of Mahendra Singh Dhoni.

=== 2nd Test ===
14–18 February
Scorecard

South Africa	v	India
296 (85 overs); HM Amla 114 (166); Z Khan 4/90 [22]		643/6d (153 overs); V Sehwag 165 (174); M Morkel 2/115 [26]
289 (131.3 overs); HM Amla 127* (394); H Singh 5/59 [48.3]

India won by an innings and 58 runs
Eden Gardens, Kolkata
Umpires: SJ Davis (Aus) and IJ Gould (Eng)
Player of the match: HM Amla

- South Africa won the toss and elected to bat.
- Alviro Petersen's score of 100 in the first innings is the third highest by a South African cricketer on a Test debut.
- The partnership of 249 runs between Sachin Tendulkar and Virender Sehwag is the highest partnership for 3rd wicket at the Eden Gardens.
- Hashim Amla scored 494 runs throughout the series, having been dismissed only once, retaining an average of 494, the second highest batting average ever in a Test series, after Wally Hammond.

== ODI series ==
=== 1st ODI ===
21 February
14:30 (D/N)
Scorecard

India; 298/9 (50 overs)	v	South Africa; 297/10 (50 overs)
SK Raina 58 (63); JH Kallis 3/29 [7]		JH Kallis 89 (97); RA Jadeja 2/29 [10]

India won by 1 run
Sawai Mansingh Stadium, Jaipur
Umpires: AM Saheba (Ind) and SK Tarapore (Ind)

- South Africa won the toss and elected to field.

=== 2nd ODI ===
24 February
14:30 (D/N)
Scorecard

India; 401/3 (50 overs)	v	South Africa; 248 (42.5 overs)
SR Tendulkar 200* (147); WD Parnell 2/95 [10]		AB de Villiers 114* (101); S Sreesanth 3/49 [7]

India won by 153 runs
Captain Roop Singh Stadium, Gwalior
Umpires: IJ Gould (Eng) and SK Tarapore (Ind)

- India won the toss and elected to bat.
- Sachin Tendulkar (Ind) became the first men's cricketer ever to score a double century in ODIs.

=== 3rd ODI ===
27 February
14:30 (D/N)
Scorecard

South Africa; 365/2 (50 overs)	v	India; 275 (44.3 overs)
JH Kallis 104* (94); RA Jadeja 1/53 [10]		V Kohli 57 (71); DW Steyn 3/37 [8]

South Africa won by 90 runs
Sardar Patel Stadium, Motera, Ahmedabad
Umpires: IJ Gould (Eng) and SS Hazare (Ind)
Player of the match: AB de Villiers (SA)

- South Africa won the toss and elected to bat first.
- Abhimanyu Mithun and Murali Vijay (Ind) both made their ODI debuts.

== Media coverage ==
=== Television ===
- NEO Cricket (live) - India, Bangladesh, Sri Lanka, Indonesia, Hong Kong (China) and UAE
- Doordarshan (live) (only one-day matches) - India
- Sky Sports (live) - Ireland and the United Kingdom
- Zee Sports (live) - United States of America
- Supersport (live) – South Africa, Kenya and Zimbabwe
- Setanta Sports Australia (live) - Australia
- GEO Super (live) - Pakistan
- Astro Box Office (pay per view) - Malaysia
- StarHub (pay per view) - Singapore
