= Indian cricket team in South Africa in 2010–11 =

International cricket tour

	India	South Africa
- Dates: 16 December 2010 – 23 January 2011
Captains	MS Dhoni	Graeme Smith; Johan Botha (Twenty20)

Test series
- Result: 3-match series drawn 1–1
Most runs	Sachin Tendulkar (326)	Jacques Kallis (498)
Most wickets	Harbhajan Singh (15)	Dale Steyn (21)
- Player of the series: Jacques Kallis (SA)

One Day International series
- Results: South Africa won the 5-match series 3–2
Most runs	Virat Kohli (193)	Hashim Amla (250)
Most wickets	Munaf Patel (11)	Lonwabo Tsotsobe (13)
- Player of the series: Morné Morkel (SA)

Twenty20 International series
- Results: India won the 1-match series 1–0
Most runs	Rohit Sharma (53)	Morne van Wyk (67)
Most wickets	Ashish Nehra (2); Yusuf Pathan (2)	Juan Theron (2)
- Player of the series: Rohit Sharma (Ind)

The Indian cricket team toured South Africa from 16 December 2010 to 23 January 2011. The tour consisted of three Tests, one Twenty20 International (T20I) and five One Day Internationals (ODIs).

== Squads ==
Tests		ODIs		T20I	
India	South Africa	India	South Africa	India	South Africa
MS Dhoni (c) (wk); Virender Sehwag; Rahul Dravid; Sachin Tendulkar; Harbhajan Singh; Zaheer Khan; Gautam Gambhir; Cheteshwar Pujara; VVS Laxman; Suresh Raina; Wriddhiman Saha (wk); Ishant Sharma; Pragyan Ojha; Murali Vijay; Umesh Yadav; S Sreesanth; Jaydev Unadkat	Graeme Smith (c); AB de Villiers (wk); Hashim Amla; Jacques Kallis; Mark Boucher (wk); Johan Botha; JP Duminy; Paul Harris; Ryan McLaren; Alviro Peterson; Morne Morkel; Wayne Parnell; Dale Steyn; Lonwabo Tsotsobe; Ashwell Prince	MS Dhoni (c) (wk); Sachin Tendulkar; Yuvraj Singh; Virat Kohli; Rohit Sharma; Suresh Raina; Murali Vijay; ~~Virender Sehwag~~; ~~Gautam Gambhir~~; Ravichandran Ashwin; Ishant Sharma; Yusuf Pathan; Zaheer Khan; Parthiv Patel (wk); Piyush Chawla; Munaf Patel; ~~Praveen Kumar~~; Sreeshanth; Harbhajan Singh; Ashish Nehra	Graeme Smith (c); Ab de Villiers (wk); Hashim Amla; Johan Botha; Morne van Wyk (wk); JP Duminy; Faf du Plessis; Colin Ingram; Robin Peterson; Imran Tahir; ~~David Miller~~; Morne Morkel; ~~Albie Morkel~~; Dale Steyn; Wayne Parnell; Lonwabo Tsotsobe	MS Dhoni (c) (wk); Virat Kohli; Sachin Tendulkar; Yuvraj Singh; Murli Vijay; Rohit Sharma; Yusuf Pathan; Suresh Raina; Zaheer Khan; Ashish Nehra; Munaf Patel; Sreeshanth; Ravichandran Ashwin; Harbhajan Singh; Praveen Kumar	Johan Botha (c); Hashim Amla; Colin Ingram; Marchant de Lange; AB de Villiers (wk); JP Duminy; Robin Peterson; David Miller; Wayne Parnell; Rusty Theron; Lonwabo Tsotsobe; Makhaya Ntini

South Africa's David Wiese was ruled out of the T20I series with a fractured hand and was replaced by Albie Morkel. Rilee Rossouw was ruled out of the ODI series following a stress fracture to his foot and was replaced by Khaya Zondo. Harbhajan Singh was added to India's ODI squad as Ravichandran Ashwin sustained a left side strain injury during the first ODI. JP Duminy was ruled out of the last two ODI matches after suffering a hand injury. He was replaced by Dean Elgar. Duminy is expected to be fit for the Test series. Vernon Philander was ruled out of the last three Test matches after suffering an ankle injury and was replaced by Kyle Abbott. Marchant de Lange was added to South Africa's Test squad as cover for Dale Steyn.

== Test Series ==
=== 1st Test ===
16–20 December 2010
Scorecard

India	v	South Africa
136 (38.4 overs); Sachin Tendulkar 36 (34); Morné Morkel 5/20 (12.4 overs)		620/4d (130.1 overs); Jacques Kallis 201* (270); Ishant Sharma 2/120 (27.1 overs)
459 (128.1 overs); Sachin Tendulkar 111* (241); Dale Steyn 4/105 (30.1 overs)

South Africa won by an innings and 25 runs
SuperSport Park, Centurion
Umpires: Steve Davis (Aus) and Ian Gould (Eng)
Player of the match: Jacques Kallis (SA)

- South Africa won the toss and elected to field.
- Rain delayed play on Day 1. Bad light ended play early on Day 4.
- Jaydev Unadkat (Ind) made his Test debut.
- Sachin Tendulkar scored his 50th Test century.
- Rahul Dravid reached 12,000 runs in Test cricket.
- Jacques Kallis scored his first double century.

=== 2nd Test ===
26–30 December 2010
Scorecard

India	v	South Africa
205 (65.1 overs); V. V. S. Laxman 38 (73); Dale Steyn 6/50 (19 overs)		131 (37.2 overs); Hashim Amla 33 (46); Harbhajan Singh 4/10 (7.2 overs)
228 (70.5 overs); V. V. S. Laxman 96 (171); Lonwabo Tsotsobe 3/43 (13 overs)		215 (72.3 overs); Ashwell Prince 39* (108); Sreesanth 3/45 (14 overs)

India won by 87 runs
Kingsmead, Durban
Umpires: Asad Rauf (Pak) and Steve Davis (Aus)
Player of the match: V. V. S. Laxman (Ind)

- South Africa won the toss and elected to field.
- Rain delayed play on Day 1. Bad light ended play on Days 2 and 3.

=== 3rd Test ===
2–6 January 2011
Scorecard

South Africa	v	India
362 (112.5 overs); Jacques Kallis 161 (291); Sreesanth 5/114 (29 overs)		364 (117.4 overs); Sachin Tendulkar 146 (314); Dale Steyn 5/75 (31 overs)
341 (102 overs); Jacques Kallis 109* (240); Harbhajan Singh 7/120 (38 overs)		166/3 (82 overs); Gautam Gambhir 64 (184); Morné Morkel 1/26 (15 overs)

Match drawn
Newlands, Cape Town
Umpires: Ian Gould (Eng) and Simon Taufel (Aus)
Player of the match: Jacques Kallis (SA)

- India won the toss and elected to field.
- Rain and bad light reduced play on Day 1.

== Krish Mackerdhuj Trophy ==
=== Only T20I ===
The winner of the T20I fixture was awarded the Krish Mackerdhuj Trophy, named in honour of Durban-born Indian-South African cricket administrator Krish Mackerdhuj.

9 January 2011
Scorecard

India; 168/6 (20 overs)	v	South Africa; 147/9 (20 overs)
Rohit Sharma 53 (34); Juan Theron 2/39 (4 overs)		Morne van Wyk 67 (39); Yusuf Pathan 2/22 (3 overs)

India won by 21 runs
Moses Mabhida Stadium, Durban
Umpires: Marais Erasmus (SA) and Brian Jerling (SA)
Player of the match: Rohit Sharma (Ind)

- India won the toss and elected to bat.
- Munaf Patel (Ind) made his T20I debut.
- This was the only cricket match held at the Moses Mabhida Stadium.
- This was Makhaya Ntini's last international match.

== ODI series ==
=== 1st ODI ===
12 January 2011 (D/N)
Scorecard

South Africa; 289/8 (50 overs)	v	India; 154 (35.4 overs)
AB de Villiers 76 (69); Rohit Sharma 2/30 (7 overs)		Virat Kohli 54 (70); Lonwabo Tsotsobe 4/31 (8.4 overs)

South Africa won by 135 runs
Kingsmead, Durban
Umpires: Marais Erasmus (SA) and Simon Taufel (Aus)
Player of the match: Lonwabo Tsotsobe (SA)

- South Africa won the toss and elected to bat.

=== 2nd ODI ===
15 January 2011 (D/N)
Scorecard

India; 190 (47.2 overs)	v	South Africa; 189 (43 overs)
Yuvraj Singh 53 (68); Lonwabo Tsotsobe 4/22 (10 overs)		Graeme Smith 77(98); Munaf Patel 4/29 (8 overs)

India won by 1 run
New Wanderers Stadium, Johannesburg
Umpires: Brian Jerling (SA) and Simon Taufel (Aus)
Player of the match: Munaf Patel (Ind)

- India won the toss and elected to bat.

Indian batsman Sachin Tendulkar suffered a hamstring injury during the match and was forced to fly home afterward. Tendulkar's appearance equalled the record number of appearances in ODI matches at 444, tied with Sanath Jayasuriya of Sri Lanka.

=== 3rd ODI ===
18 January 2011 (D/N)
Scorecard

South Africa; 220 (49.2 overs)	v	India; 223/8 (48.2 overs)
Faf du Plessis 60 (78); Zaheer Khan 3/43 (9.2 overs)		Yusuf Pathan 59 (50); Morné Morkel 3/28 (10 overs)

India won by 2 wickets
Newlands, Cape Town
Umpires: Johanes Cloete (SA) and Simon Taufel (Aus)
Player of the match: Yusuf Pathan (Ind)

- South Africa won the toss and elected to bat.
- Faf du Plessis (SA) made his ODI debut.

=== 4th ODI ===
21 January 2011 (D/N)
Scorecard

South Africa; 265/7 (50 overs)	v	India; 142/6 (32.5 overs)
JP Duminy 71 (72); Yuvraj Singh 3/34 (8 overs)		Virat Kohli 87(92); Lonwabo Tsotsobe 2/25 (6 overs)

South Africa won by 48 runs (D/L method)
St George's Park, Port Elizabeth
Umpires: Johanes Cloete (SA) and Simon Taufel (Aus)
Player of the match: JP Duminy (SA)

- South Africa won the toss and elected to bat.
- Play called off at 32.5 overs of the Indian innings due to rain. The par score was 190 runs from 32.5 overs according to the Duckworth–Lewis method.

=== 5th ODI ===
23 January 2011
10:00
Scorecard

South Africa; 250/9 (46 overs)	v	India; 234 (40.2 / 46 overs)
Hashim Amla 116 (132); Munaf Patel 3/50 (8 overs)		Yusuf Pathan 105 (70); Morné Morkel 4/52 (8 overs)

South Africa won by 33 runs (D/L method)
SuperSport Park, Centurion
Umpires: Brian Jerling (SA) and Simon Taufel (Aus)
Player of the match: Hashim Amla (SA)

- India won the toss and elected to field.
- Rain during the South African innings reduced the match to 46 overs-a-side. The Duckworth–Lewis method set India a target of 268.
