= South African cricket team against Pakistan in the UAE in 2010–11 =

Pakistani cricket team vs South Africa in UAE 2010
	Pakistan	South Africa
- Dates: 26 October – 24 November
Captains	Misbah-ul-Haq (Tests); Shahid Afridi (ODIs/T20s)	Graeme Smith (Tests/ODIs); Johan Botha (T20s)

Test series
- Result: 2-match series drawn 0–0
Most runs	Azhar Ali (237)	Jacques Kallis (323)
Most wickets	Abdur Rehman (9)	Paul Harris (7)
- Player of the series: Jacques Kallis (SA)

One Day International series
- Results: South Africa won the 5-match series 3–2
Most runs	Mohammad Hafeez (203)	Hashim Amla (291)
Most wickets	Shoaib Akhtar (7)	Morné Morkel (8)
- Player of the series: Hashim Amla (SA)

Twenty20 International series
- Results: South Africa won the 2-match series 2–0
Most runs	Misbah-ul-Haq (60)	Colin Ingram (77)
Most wickets	Shoaib Akhtar (3)	Lonwabo Tsotsobe (5)
- Player of the series: Johan Botha (SA)

The Pakistan cricket team played against South Africa in UAE from 26 October to 24 November 2010. The tour was originally scheduled to consist of one Twenty20 (T20), five One Day Internationals (ODIs) and two Tests, but due to the 2010 Pakistan floods, South Africa proposed to play another T20 to raise funds for flood victims.

On 7 October, Pakistan announced their 15-men squad marking the return of Misbah-ul-Haq but no captain was announced (despite the fact that Shahid Afridi has been their limited-overs captain since June that year). A day later, Misbah-ul-Haq was named as the Test captain, while Shahid Afridi was retained as limited-overs captain.

South African captain Graeme Smith announced that despite the controversies surrounding the Pakistan cricket team relating to the spot-fixing scandal, it was important to focus on the series so that the team can prepare for the World Cup.

After much media speculations, it was announced that the Umpire Decision Review System would not be used for the Test series. The Pakistan Cricket Board stated that the media contracts it had signed earlier do not cover UDRS, therefore it would not be used in any of Pakistan's home matches until at least 2012.

South Africa won the ODI series 3-2.

== Squads ==
Test squads		Limited overs Squads	
Pakistan	South Africa	Pakistan	South Africa
Misbah-ul-Haq (c); Imran Farhat; Taufeeq Umar; Mohammad Yousuf; Umar Akmal; Asad Shafiq; Mohammad Hafeez; Sohail Tanvir; Mohammad Sami; Umar Gul; Saeed Ajmal; Abdur Rehman; Azhar Ali; Tanvir Ahmed; Adnan Akmal (wk); Wahab Riaz; Younus Khan	Graeme Smith (c); Hashim Amla; Johan Botha; Mark Boucher (wk); AB de Villiers; JP Duminy; Paul Harris; Jacques Kallis; Morné Morkel; Wayne Parnell; Alviro Petersen; Ashwell Prince; Dale Steyn; Lonwabo Tsotsobe	Shahid Afridi (c); Imran Farhat; Mohammad Hafeez; Younus Khan; Umar Akmal; Asad Shafiq; Tanvir Ahmed; Abdul Razzaq; Shoaib Akhtar; Umar Gul; Saeed Ajmal; Abdur Rehman; Shahzaib Hasan; Fawad Alam; Zulqarnain Haider (wk); Wahab Riaz; Misbah-ul-Haq; Mohammad Yousuf	Graeme Smith (c) (ODI); Hashim Amla; Johan Botha (c) (T20); Albie Morkel; AB de Villiers (wk); JP Duminy; David Miller; Jacques Kallis; Morné Morkel; Wayne Parnell; Robin Peterson; Ashwell Prince; Dale Steyn; Lonwabo Tsotsobe; Charl Langeveldt; Rusty Theron; Loots Bosman; Colin Ingram

== Twenty20 ==
=== 1st T20I ===
26 October 2010
Scorecard

Pakistan; 119 (19.5 overs)	v	South Africa; 120/4 (18.2 overs)
Misbah-ul-Haq 27* (32); Lonwabo Tsotsobe 3/16 (4 overs)		Colin Ingram 46* (38); Shoaib Akhtar 2/29 (4 overs)

South Africa won by 6 wickets
Sheikh Zayed Stadium, Abu Dhabi
Umpires: Ahsan Raza and Asad Rauf (both Pak)
Player of the match: JP Duminy (SA)

- Pakistan won the toss and elected to bat.

=== 2nd T20I ===
27 October 2010
Scorecard

Pakistan; 120/9 (20 overs)	v	South Africa; 125/4 (19.4 overs)
Misbah-ul-Haq 33 (38); Juan Theron 4/27 (4 overs)		Graeme Smith 38 (42); Shahid Afridi 1/13 (4 overs)

South Africa won by 6 wickets
Sheikh Zayed Cricket Stadium, Abu Dhabi
Umpires: Asad Rauf and Nadeem Ghauri (both Pak)
Player of the match: Juan Theron (SA)

- Pakistan won the toss and elected to bat.

== ODI series ==
=== 1st ODI ===
29 October 2010
Scorecard

Pakistan; 203 (49 overs)	v	South Africa; 207/2 (39.3 overs)
Mohammad Hafeez 68 (84); Lonwabo Tsotsobe 4/27 (10 overs)		Jacques Kallis 66 (88); Saeed Ajmal 2/42 (10 overs)

South Africa won by 8 wickets
Sheikh Zayed Stadium, Abu Dhabi
Umpires: Asad Rauf (Pak) and Rod Tucker (Aus)
Player of the match: Lonwabo Tsotsobe (SA)

- Pakistan won the toss and elected to bat.

=== 2nd ODI ===
31 October 2010
Scorecard

South Africa; 286/8 (50 overs)	v	Pakistan; 289/9 (49.5 overs)
Colin Ingram 100 (119); Wahab Riaz 4/43 (10 overs)		Abdul Razzaq 109* (72); Charl Langeveldt 4/75 (10 overs)

Pakistan won by 1 wickets
Sheikh Zayed Stadium, Abu Dhabi
Umpires: Aleem Dar (Pak) and Rod Tucker (Aus)
Player of the match: Abdul Razzaq (Pak)

- South Africa won the toss and elected to bat.

=== 3rd ODI ===
2 November 2010
Scorecard

South Africa; 228/9 (50 overs)	v	Pakistan; 226/9 (50 overs)
Hashim Amla 119* (126); Shoaib Akhtar 3/39 (10 overs)		Fawad Alam 59* (67); Morné Morkel 4/47 (10 overs)

South Africa won by 2 runs
Dubai International Cricket Stadium, Dubai
Umpires: Aleem Dar (Pak) and Rod Tucker (Aus)
Player of the match: Hashim Amla (SA)

- Pakistan won the toss and elected to field.

=== 4th ODI ===
5 November 2010
Scorecard

South Africa; 274/6 (50 overs)	v	Pakistan; 275/9 (49.5 overs)
Graeme Smith 92 (105); Mohammad Hafeez 2/37 (7 overs)		Younis Khan 73 (115); Morné Morkel 4/48 (10 overs)

Pakistan won by 1 wickets
Dubai International Cricket Stadium, Dubai
Umpires: Daryl Harper (Aus) and Zameer Haider (Pak)
Player of the match: Younis Khan (Pak)

- South Africa won the toss and elected to bat.

=== 5th ODI ===
8 November 2010
Scorecard

South Africa; 317/5 (50 overs)	v	Pakistan; 260 (44.5 overs)
Jacques Kallis 83 (95); Shahid Afridi 2/59 (10 overs)		Umar Akmal 60 (71); Jacques Kallis 3/30 (5 overs)

South Africa won by 57 runs
Dubai International Cricket Stadium, Dubai
Umpires: Daryl Harper (Aus) and Nadeem Ghauri (Pak)
Player of the match: Jacques Kallis (SA)

- South Africa won the toss and elected to bat.

== Test Series ==
=== 1st Test ===
12–16 November 2010
Scorecard

South Africa	v	Pakistan
380 (123 overs); Graeme Smith 100 (152); Umar Gul 3/100 (30 overs)		248 (95 overs); Mohammad Hafeez 60 (89); Morné Morkel 5/54 (21 overs)
318/2d (95 overs); Jacques Kallis 135* (218); Saeed Ajmal 1/102 (27 overs)		343/3 (117 overs); Younis Khan 131* (230); Paul Harris 1/57 (31 overs)

Match drawn
Dubai International Cricket Stadium, Dubai
Umpires: Asoka de Silva (SL) and Daryl Harper (Aus)
Player of the match: Younis Khan (Pak)

- South Africa won the toss and elected to bat.
- Pakistan's second innings was the highest fourth innings score for Pakistan.

=== 2nd Test ===
20–24 November 2010
Scorecard

South Africa	v	Pakistan
584/9d (153 overs); AB de Villiers 278* (418); Tanvir Ahmed 6/120 (28 overs)		434 (144.1 overs); Azhar Ali 90 (175); Dale Steyn 4/98 (30 overs)
203/5d (55 overs); Hashim Amla 62 (64); Abdur Rehman 3/81 (22 overs)		153/3 (67 overs); Misbah-ul-Haq 58* (140); Paul Harris 2/28 (23 overs)

Match drawn
Sheikh Zayed Stadium, Abu Dhabi
Umpires: Asoka de Silva (SL) and Daryl Harper (Aus)
Player of the match: AB de Villiers (SA)

- Pakistan won the toss and elected to field.
- Bad light stopped play towards the end on day 2.

== Media coverage ==
=== Television ===
- Ten Sports : India, Sri Lanka and Pakistan
- Pakistan Television : Pakistan
- Eurosport : England
- Setanta Sports Australia : Australia
- ARY Digital : Europe, UAE and Pakistan
- SuperSport : South Africa, Kenya, Zimbabwe
- Zee Sports : USA
- CBN-ATN : Canada
