= Australian cricket team in South Africa in 2011–12 =

	South Africa	Australia
- Dates: 13 October 2011 – 21 November 2011
Captains	Hashim Amla (ODI and T20I); Graeme Smith (Test)	Michael Clarke (Test and ODI); Cameron White (T20I)

Test series
- Result: 2-match series drawn 1–1
Most runs	Hashim Amla (239)	Michael Clarke (166)
Most wickets	Vernon Philander (14)	Pat Cummins (7)
- Player of the series: Vernon Philander (SA)

One Day International series
- Results: Australia won the 3-match series 2–1
Most runs	Jacques Kallis (145)	Michael Hussey (112)
Most wickets	Morné Morkel (5); Dale Steyn (5)	Xavier Doherty (5); Mitchell Johnson (5); Pat Cummins (5)
- Player of the series: Michael Hussey (Aus)

Twenty20 International series
- Results: 2-match series drawn 1–1
Most runs	JP Duminy (67)	Cameron White (67)
Most wickets	Lonwabo Tsotsobe (3); Morné Morkel (3)	Pat Cummins (5)
- Player of the series: Rusty Theron (SA)

The Australia national cricket team toured South Africa from 13 October to 21 November 2011. The tour consisted of two Twenty20 Internationals (T20I), three One Day Internationals (ODIs) and two Tests.

== Squads ==
Tests		ODIs		T20Is	
South Africa	Australia	South Africa	Australia	South Africa	Australia
Graeme Smith (c); AB de Villiers (vc); Hashim Amla; JP Duminy; Jacques Kallis; Morné Morkel; Paul Harris; Imran Tahir; Mark Boucher (wk); Vernon Philander; Ashwell Prince; Jacques Rudolph; Dale Steyn; Lonwabo Tsotsobe	Michael Clarke (c); Shane Watson (vc); Ricky Ponting; Michael Beer; Trent Copeland; Nathan Lyon; Shaun Marsh; Pat Cummins; Brad Haddin (wk); Ryan Harris; Phil Hughes; Michael Hussey; Mitchell Johnson; Usman Khawaja; Peter Siddle	Hashim Amla (c); Graeme Smith; Johan Botha; JP Duminy; Jacques Kallis; Morné Morkel; Faf du Plessis; Imran Tahir; Mark Boucher (wk); David Miller; Wayne Parnell; Robin Peterson; Dale Steyn; Lonwabo Tsotsobe	Michael Clarke (c); Shane Watson (vc); Ricky Ponting; David Warner; Steve Smith; Brett Lee; Shaun Marsh; Pat Cummins; Brad Haddin (wk); Cameron White; Doug Bollinger; Michael Hussey; Mitchell Johnson; Xavier Doherty; James Pattinson	Hashim Amla (c); Graeme Smith; Johan Botha; JP Duminy; Colin Ingram; Morné Morkel; Richard Levi; Ryan McLaren; Heino Kuhn (wk); David Miller; Wayne Parnell; Robin Peterson; Rusty Theron; Lonwabo Tsotsobe; Albie Morkel	Cameron White (c); Shane Watson (vc); Ricky Ponting; David Warner; Steve Smith; Brett Lee; Shaun Marsh; Pat Cummins; Matthew Wade (wk); David Hussey; Doug Bollinger; Aaron Finch; Mitchell Marsh; Steve O'Keefe; James Pattinson

- * = withdrawn

== Tour matches ==
=== South Africa A v Australians ===
1–4 November
Scorecard

South Africa A	v	Australians
183 (54 overs); Dean Elgar 47 (93); Mitchell Johnson 4/38 (11 overs)		236 (72.2 overs); Michael Clarke 76 (123); Marchant de Lange 5/56 (19 overs)
264 (62 overs); Alviro Petersen 103 (145); Mitchell Johnson 5/74 (18 overs)		214/3 (40.4 overs); Shane Watson 77 (73); Robin Peterson 1/15 (5 overs)

Australians won by 7 wickets
Senwes Park, Potchefstroom
Umpires: Johan Cloete (SA) and Shaun George (SA)
Player of the match: Mitchell Johnson (Australians)

- South Africa A won the toss and elected to bat.

== T20I series ==
=== 1st T20I ===
13 October (D/N)
Scorecard

South Africa; 146/7 (20 overs)	v	Australia; 147/5 (19.3 overs)
JP Duminy 67 (53); Pat Cummins 3/25 (4 overs)		Shane Watson 52 (39); Lonwabo Tsotsobe 1/21 (4 overs)

Australia won by 5 wickets
Newlands, Cape Town
Umpires: Marais Erasmus (SA) and Adrian Holdstock (SA)
Player of the match: Shane Watson (Aus)

- South Africa won the toss and elected to bat.
- Pat Cummins (Aus) made his T20I debut.

=== 2nd T20I ===
17 October
Scorecard

Australia; 147/8 (20 overs)	v	South Africa; 148/7 (19.1 overs)
Cameron White 39 (26); Lonwabo Tsotsobe 2/11 (4 overs)		Johan Botha 34 (28); James Pattinson 2/17 (4 overs)

South Africa won by 3 wickets
Wanderers Stadium, Johannesburg
Umpires: Johan Cloete (SA) and Shaun George (SA)
Player of the match: Rusty Theron (SA)

- Australia won the toss and elected to bat.

== ODI series ==
=== 1st ODI ===
19 October (D/N)
Scorecard

Australia; 183/4 (29 overs)	v	South Africa; 129 (22 overs)
Ricky Ponting 63 (77); Dale Steyn 2/48 (6 overs)		Faf du Plessis 27 (20); Mitchell Johnson 3/20 (5 overs)

Australia won by 93 runs (D/L)
Centurion Park, Centurion
Umpires: Johan Cloete (SA) and Ian Gould (Eng)
Player of the match: Ricky Ponting (Aus)

- South Africa won the toss and elected to field.
- Match reduced to 29 overs per side due to rain. South Africa target was 223 runs in 29 overs.
- Pat Cummins and Mitchell Marsh became the youngest and fifth youngest players to make their ODI debut for Australia, respectively.

=== 2nd ODI ===
23 October (D/N)
Scorecard

South Africa; 303/6 (50 overs)	v	Australia; 223 (50 overs)
Jacques Kallis 76 (88); Doug Bollinger 2/64 (10 overs)		David Warner 74 (97); Morné Morkel 4/22 (10 overs)

South Africa won by 80 runs
St George's Park, Port Elizabeth
Umpires: Shaun George (SA) and Richard Kettleborough (Eng)
Player of the match: Morné Morkel (SA)

- South Africa won the toss and elected to bat first.

=== 3rd ODI ===
28 October (D/N)
Scorecard

South Africa; 222/6 (50 overs)	v	Australia; 227/7 (47.3 overs)
Jacques Kallis 54 (74); Xavier Doherty 2/33 (9 overs)		Shane Watson 49 (46); Jacques Kallis 2/17 (5 overs)

Australia won by 3 wickets
Kingsmead, Durban
Umpires: Johan Cloete (SA) and Ian Gould (Eng)
Player of the match: Shane Watson (Aus)

- South Africa won the toss and elected to bat.

== Test series ==
=== 1st Test ===
9–11 November 2011 (Note: While five days of play were scheduled for each Test, the first Test reached a result in three days.)
Scorecard

Australia	v	South Africa
284 (75 overs); Michael Clarke 151 (176); Dale Steyn 4/55 (20 overs)		96 (24.3 overs); Graeme Smith 37 (48); Shane Watson 5/17 (5 overs)
47 (18 overs); Nathan Lyon 14 (24); Vernon Philander 5/15 (7 overs)		236/2 (50.2 overs); Hashim Amla 112 (134); Peter Siddle 1/49 (12.2 overs)

South Africa won by 8 wickets
Newlands, Cape Town
Umpires: Billy Doctrove (WI) and Ian Gould (Eng)
Player of the match: Vernon Philander (SA)

- South Africa won the toss and elected to field.
- Vernon Philander and Imran Tahir (SA) both made their Test debuts.

South Africa won the toss and elected to field. At the end of the first day, Australia had made 214 for the loss of 8 wickets, with South African bowler Dale Steyn picking up 4 wickets for 31 runs. On the second day, Australia were eventually dismissed for 284, with Michael Clarke equalling his third highest Test score with 151. Batting second, South Africa were dismissed for just 96 runs, with Australian all-rounder Shane Watson taking five wickets for 17 runs in five overs. In their second innings, Australia were reduced to 13–3 by tea on the second day. After tea they went from 21–6 to 21–9, before being bowled out for 47 runs. This was their fourth lowest Test score and their lowest total for 109 years. Debutant Vernon Philander finished with figures of 5–15 from seven overs. On the third day, Graeme Smith and Hashim Amla both reached centuries to help South Africa to an 8-wicket victory.

=== 2nd Test ===
17–21 November 2011
Scorecard

South Africa	v	Australia
266 (71 overs); AB de Villiers 64 (97); Peter Siddle 3/69 (15 overs)		296 (76.4 overs); Phillip Hughes 88 (111); Dale Steyn 4/64 (18 overs)
339 (110 overs); Hashim Amla 105 (243); Pat Cummins 6/79 (29 overs)		310/8 (86.5 overs); Usman Khawaja 65 (110); Vernon Philander 5/70 (20 overs)

Australia won by 2 wickets
Wanderers Stadium, Johannesburg
Umpires: Billy Bowden (NZ) and Ian Gould (Eng)
Player of the match: Pat Cummins (Aus)

- South Africa won the toss and elected to bat.
- Pat Cummins (Aus) made his Test debut.
