= South African cricket team in Australia in 2008–09 =

	Australia	South Africa
- Dates: 6 December 2008 – 30 January 2009
Captains	Ricky Ponting	Graeme Smith (Tests); Johan Botha (ODIs and T20Is)

Test series
- Result: South Africa won the 3-match series 2–1
Most runs	Michael Clarke (383)	Graeme Smith (326)
Most wickets	Mitchell Johnson (17)	Dale Steyn (18)
- Player of the series: Graeme Smith (South Africa)

One Day International series
- Results: South Africa won the 5-match series 4–1
Most runs	Shaun Marsh (218)	Hashim Amla (199)
Most wickets	Ben Hilfenhaus (7)	Makhaya Ntini (8); Dale Steyn (8); Johan Botha (8)
- Player of the series: Albie Morkel (South Africa)

Twenty20 International series
- Results: Australia won the 2-match series 2–0
Most runs	David Warner (96)	JP Duminy (147)
Most wickets	David Hussey (4)	Dale Steyn (4)

The South Africa cricket team toured Australia between 6 December 2008 and 30 January 2009, playing three Test matches, two Twenty20 Internationals and five One Day Internationals against Australia.

Following a dispute with Cricket Australia, the three leading news agencies, Reuters, Agence France-Presse and Associated Press decided not to cover the series.

== Build-up ==
The South African players and media were buoyant ahead the tour, citing their telling Test form and Australia's coincident decline. Proteas captain Graeme Smith saw it as his team's best chance to win a Test rubber Down Under: the bowling attack was globally vaunted, the fielding polished and the batsmen enjoying a particularly fecund run, Neil McKenzie, Hashim Amla and Smith himself all having passed 1,000 Test runs for the year, while Ashwell Prince and AB de Villiers hovered around the 900 mark.

Australia, on the other hand, was still reeling from its two-nil Test defeat in India, although a clinical display against the touring New Zealanders assuaged some of their apprehensions: most notably, wicketkeeper Brad Haddin's sizeable hundred against New Zealand for once made seamless the void left by Adam Gilchrist's retirement.

The press duly built the series up as a must-see, but the players were far more reticent than they had been during the adjacent encounter three years before. Early in December, however, Australian captain Ricky Ponting drew considerable criticism for his comments about the ICC's wines and spirits. "It has taken us a long time and a lot of great wins in different conditions around the world to get us to that number-one spot", Ponting declared, speaking to the Associated Press. "If South Africa beat us three-nil I don't know if that gives them enough points to get over us. But if they won the series one-nil or two-one, I don't think that would mean that they deserve to take over that mantle. It's a bit the same with India last series. Just because they beat us, the number-one team, doesn't necessarily mean they go from the number four or number five in the world to number one in the world, because it's something that's accrued over a long period of time." The remark was seen as fatalist and trivialising, suggesting that the rubber hardly mattered and, in the eyes of many, that Ponting's hopes of securing a series victory were low.

South African allround kingpin Jacques Kallis arrived in Australia on the back of one of the worst batting troughs of his career. A little over a week before the First Test, journalist Robert Houwing observed that many of his countrymen had "been ripping the proverbial fox to shreds: almost surreally, Kallis is the hound labouring at the rear of the pack. He shows just 519 runs from 13 Tests and 20 innings this year, at 28.83."

== Squads ==
Test squads
Australia	South Africa
Ricky Ponting (c)	Graeme Smith (c)
Michael Clarke	Ashwell Prince
Stuart Clark	Hashim Amla
Brad Haddin (wk)	Mark Boucher (wk)
Matthew Hayden	AB de Villiers
Michael Hussey	JP Duminy
Simon Katich	Paul Harris
Mitchell Johnson	Jacques Kallis
Jason Krejza	Neil McKenzie
Brett Lee	Morné Morkel
Peter Siddle	Makhaya Ntini
Andrew Symonds	Robin Peterson
Shane Watson	Dale Steyn
Doug Bollinger	Lonwabo Tsotsobe
Nathan Hauritz	Monde Zondeki
Ben Hilfenhaus
Andrew McDonald

Following injuries to Watson, Symonds, Clark, Krejza and Lee, Australia drafted in McDonald, Hilfenhaus, Bollinger and Hauritz.

== Test series ==
=== First Test ===
17–21 December
Scorecard

Australia	v	South Africa
375 (98.5 overs); Simon Katich 83 (151); Makhaya Ntini 4/72 (19.5 overs)		281 (89.5 overs); Jacques Kallis 63 (111); Mitchell Johnson 8/61 (24 overs)
319 (97 overs); Brad Haddin 94 (136); Jacques Kallis 3/24 (14 overs)		4/414 (119.2 overs); Graeme Smith 108 (147); AB de Villiers 106* (186); Mitchell Johnson 3/98 (34.2 overs)

South Africa won by 6 wickets
WACA, Perth, Australia Att: Day 1 - 13,679. Day 2 - 10,515. Day 3 - 15,268. Day 4 - 10,550. Day 5 - 5301. Total - 55,313.
Umpires: Aleem Dar and Asoka de Silva
Player of the match: AB de Villiers

Team selections: Shane Watson was named 12th man for Australia. South Africa's Ashwell Prince withdrew from the First Test team after suffering a broken thumb while batting in the nets. JP Duminy was chosen to replace Prince to make his Test debut.

Day 1: Australia won the toss and elected to bat.
After a brief flurry of boundaries from Matthew Hayden, South Africa took three quick wickets - Hayden (12), Ponting (0, first ball) and Hussey (0) - to have Australia 3/15. Simon Katich (83) and Michael Clarke (62) then combined for a 4th-wicket partnership of 149 before both batsmen were out in the two overs before tea, leaving the home side at 5/166. After tea Andrew Symonds and Brad Haddin pushed the run rate up towards 5 per over before Symonds was dismissed for 57, off 68 balls. Haddin (46) and Brett Lee (29) scored at a steady rate, and the day ended with Mitchell Johnson being out off the last ball of the day for 18. Jason Krejza remained 19 not out and Australia finished the day at 9/341.
South Africa took a while to get used to the pitch before Makhaya Ntini took two wickets and Dale Steyn one within five overs in the morning session. The pitch settled down after lunch and only persistent bowling and poor shot selection produced the bulk of the wickets. Ntini finished with 3-66, Steyn 2-72, Morné Morkel 1-62, and Paul Harris 2-70.

Reports considered that honours were relatively even at the end of day one.

Day 2: Australia's tenth wicket partnership put on 34 runs, and the team ended on 375. Morkel took the last wicket to finish with figures of 2-80.
South Africa lost McKenzie for 2, but then consolidated until Amla (47) and Smith (48) fell close together and the score was 3/110. Kallis (63) and de Villiers (63) seemed to be in total control, and took the score to 234 without further loss. Mitchell Johnson then took 5 wickets for 2 runs in 21 deliveries with the old ball to have South Africa 8/243 at stumps. Johnson finished the day with 7-42. Krejza was the only other wicket-taker with figures of 1–102.

Day 3: South Africa's last two wickets put on 38 runs to end at 281, with Johnson and Siddle taking one each. Johnson finished the innings with 8-61, the 8th best bowling figures in Australian Test cricket history. He might have taken nine, and the best figures ever, except that a skied top edge from Boucher (26) fell between Haddin and Lee in a mix-up between the fielders. Other wicket-takers: Siddle 1–44, and Krejza 1–102. Australia had a lead of 94 runs on the first innings.

Australia lost wickets regularly to reach 4/88. Katich (37) and Ponting (32) both got starts but were dismissed by determined bowling. A 60-run partnership between Clarke (25) and Symonds (37) was followed by three quick wickets. At 162–7 the match was evenly poised. Haddin (39*) and Krejza (28*) then added 66 runs to end the day with Australia at 7/228, and a lead of 322.

South African wicket-takers: Kallis 2–19, Steyn 2–57, Harris 2–64, Ntini 1–55.

Day 4: Australia's tail wagged for the second time in the match (putting on 162 runs for the last 4 wickets). Haddin (94), Krejza (32) and Johnson (21) all contributing runs and Siddle being at the crease for 37 minutes for his 4*. Haddin was the last out attempting to hit a six to reach his century, but was stumped by Boucher off Harris. Australia's total of 319 gave it a lead of 413.

South African wicket-takers: Kallis 3-24, Harris 3-85, Steyn 2-81, Morkel 1-42, Ntini 1-76.

South Africa started its run-chase slowly with McKenzie taking 52 deliveries to make his 10. Amla's arrival changed all that and he and Smith put on 153 for the second wicket in good time before Smith was out for 108 - his first score above 50 against Australia. Amla (53) was out shortly thereafter and the score was 3/179. Kallis (33*) and de Villiers (11*) saw the visitors through to stumps at 3/227.
Australian wicket-takers: Lee 1-40, Johnson 2-56.

Day 5: Requiring 187 runs to win with a full day's play available, South Africa achieved the second highest successful run chase in Test cricket history, losing only the wicket of Kallis (57) on their way to 4/414. AB de Villiers (106*) and debutant JP Duminy (50*) put on 111 for the fifth wicket to take the visitors to victory.

Australia had a poor day in the field, taking only one wicket. Johnson 3-98 finished with 11 wickets for the match, while Lee was the only other wicket-taker with 1-73.

=== Second Test ===
26–30 December
Scorecard

Australia	v	South Africa
394 (113.4 overs); Ricky Ponting 101 (126); Dale Steyn 5/87 (29 overs)		459 (153 overs); Jean-Paul Duminy 166 (340); Peter Siddle 4/81 (34 overs)
247 (84.2 overs); Ricky Ponting 99 (169); Dale Steyn 5/67 (20.2 overs)		1/183 (48 overs); Graeme Smith 75 (94); Nathan Hauritz 1/41 (10 overs)

South Africa won by 9 wickets
Melbourne Cricket Ground, Melbourne, Australia Att: Day 1 - 63,263. Day 2 - 42,814. Day 3 - 42,079. Day 4 - 19,847. Day 5 - 6343. Total - 174,246.
Umpires: Aleem Dar and Billy Doctrove
Player of the match: Dale Steyn

Team selections: Despite an injured knee Andrew Symonds was preferred to Shane Watson, who again was named 12th man. Australia also replaced Jason Krejza with Nathan Hauritz. South Africa named an unchanged side, after Ashwell Prince failed a fitness test on his cracked left thumb.

Day One: Australia won the toss and elected to bat.
Hayden (8) fell early before Katich (54) and Ponting (101) put on a 107-run partnership for the second wicket. Hussey went for his second duck in three innings before Symonds (27) and Haddin (40) got starts but didn't go on with it. Australia ended the day on 280–6, with Clarke (36*) and Lee (0*) at the crease. The Australian highlight of the day was Ponting's 37th Test century in front of a crowd of 63,263.
South African wicket-takers: Steyn 2-61, Ntini 2-71, Harris 1-33, and Morkel 1-67.

Day Two: Michael Clarke (88*) and the tail added a further 114 runs and Australia ended its first innings on 394.
South African wicket-takers: Steyn 5-87, Ntini 2–108, Harris 1-38, Kallis 1-55 and Morkel 1-89.
South Africa stated slowly and reached 141-6 when Boucher was dismissed. Smith continued his run of form with 62. Duminy (34*) and Morkel (21) helped the score to 198–7 at the close.
Australian wicket-takers: Siddle 3-24, Hauritz 2-49, and Johnson 2-53.

Day Three: In a remarkable day's play South Africa reached 459 all out, after Duminy (166) and Steyn (76) put on 180 for the ninth wicket - the third highest all-time. Brett Lee didn't take the field all day due to a stress fracture in his foot, and Australia was left with three front-line bowlers and their part-timers.
Australian wicket-takers: Siddle 4-81, Hauritz 3-98, Johnson 2–127, and Hussey 1-22.
Australia faced only 3 overs at the end of the day and finished on 4–0.

Day Four: Only captain Ricky Ponting (99) and bowler Mitchell Johnson (43*) withstood the South Africa bowling as Australia was dismissed for 247 in their second innings. Ponting just missed out on a second century for the match which would have made him the only player to have done so four times. Steyn took five wickets to finish with ten for the match.
South African wicket-takers: Steyn 5-67, Morkel 2-46, Kallis 2-57, and Ntini 1-26.
South Africa were set 183 to win the match. At the close of play South Africa were 30–0.

Day Five: Losing only captain Graeme Smith for 75, South Africa reached their victory target in 48 overs. This gave them a 2–0 lead in the series and their first ever Test series win in Australia.
Australian wicket-taker: Hauritz 1-41.

The fallout was significant: while the hosts were almost universally roasted, their opponents were lauded to the skies. Talk predominated around the forging of a new world order. "This defeat doesn't mark the end of an era", claimed Gideon Haigh in his blog for The Guardian. "The era had already ended. And the 13-year green and golden age in international cricket has really been a sequence of overlapping phases, subtly different, distinguished by key retirements: Taylor and Healy in 1999; the Waughs in 2003; Warne and McGrath in 2007." Calls for Shane Warne's return to Test cricket, omnipresent since his retirement in 2007, were now accompanied by calls for him to be given the captaincy in the impending Ashes as well. This was also the first time since 1992-93 Australia had lost a test series at home.

=== Third Test ===
3–7 January
Scorecard

Australia	v	South Africa
445 (136.2 overs); Michael Clarke 138 (361); Paul Harris 3/84 (29.2 overs)		327 (120.5 overs); Mark Boucher 89 (171); Peter Siddle 5/59 (27.5 overs)
4/257d (67.3 overs); Simon Katich 61 (136); Morné Morkel 2/38 (12 overs)		272 (114.2 overs); Hashim Amla 59 (112); Peter Siddle 3/54 (27 overs)

Australia won by 103 runs
Sydney Cricket Ground, Sydney, Australia
Umpires: Billy Bowden and Asoka de Silva
Player of the match: Peter Siddle

Team selections: South Africa picked the same team for the third Test in a row. Brett Lee, Andrew Symonds and Shane Watson were all omitted from the Australian team due to injury. Doug Bollinger and Andrew McDonald were included in the starting eleven, with Ben Hilfenhaus again being left out.

Day One: Australia won the toss for the third time in the series and elected to bat.
After Katich (47) started strongly, Ponting was dismissed first ball for the second time in the series and Australia was 63–2. Hayden (31) and Hussey (30) both struggled, before Clarke (73*) and Haddin (38) came together at 162–5. Australia finished the day on 267–6, from 88 overs.
South Africa seemed flat in the field, with Clarke being dropped twice, but continued to take wickets at regular intervals.
South African wicket-takers: Steyn 2-71, Kallis 1-43, Harris 1-44, Morkel 1-49, and Ntini 1-53.

Day Two: Clarke (138) and Johnson (64) batted through the first session without loss - the first time Australia had done so for the series. Late hitting from Hauritz (41) and Siddle (23) lifted the total to 445 all out from 136.2 overs.
South African wicket-takers: Harris 3-84, Steyn 3-95, Duminy 1–14, Kallis 1-54, Morkel 1-89, and Ntini 1–102.
In reply, South Africa lost Smith retired hurt for 30 - with a broken left hand courtesy of a lifter from Johnson. McKenzie (23) and Amla (30*) were patient before Kallis (36*) lifted the scoring rate late in the day. South Africa finished on 125–1.
Australian wicket-taker: Siddle 1-21.

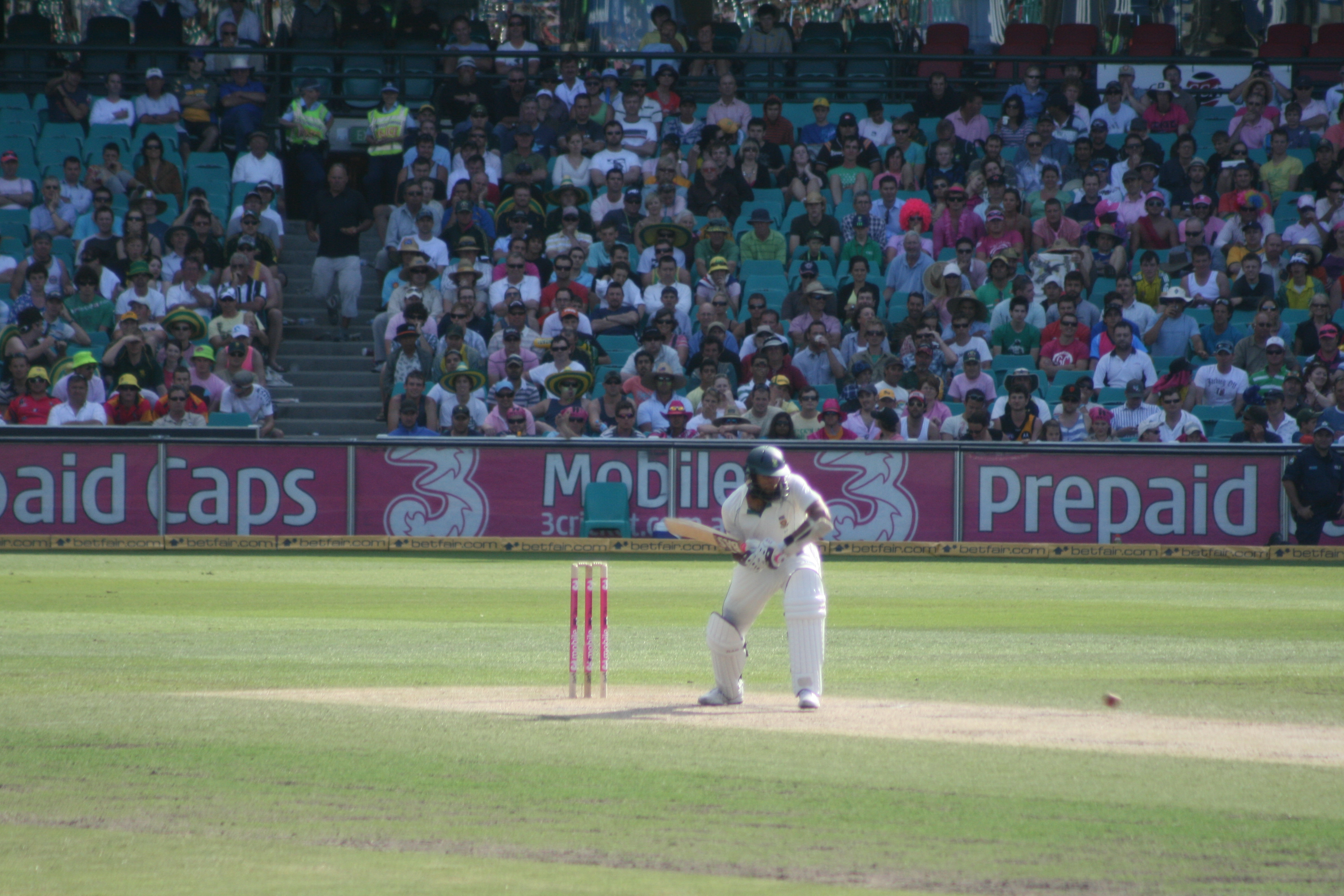
Hashim Amla batting in the Third Test at Sydney

Day Three: Johnson (2 wickets and a run-out) and McDonald (1 wicket) reduced South Africa to 193-5 (with Smith absent injured) before Boucher (89) and Morkel (40) put on 115 for the 6th wicket. Siddle then took 4–7 in 22 deliveries to have South Africa all out for 327. This gave Australia a lead of 118 on the first innings.
Australian wicket-takers: Siddle 5-59 (his first 5 wicket haul in Test cricket), Johnson 2-69, and McDonald 1-41.
In reply, Australia were 33 without loss from 6 overs.

Day Four: Australia aimed to set South Africa a victory target on the fifth day with Ponting (53) and Katich (61) getting starts. Hussey (45*) anchored the innings while Clarke (41) attempted to score quickly. The declaration at 257-4 set South Africa 376 to win.
South African wicket-takers: Morkel 2-38, Steyn 1-60, and Harris 1-63.
With Smith absent injured Morkel (0) opened the batting with McKenzie. His demise gave Bollinger his first Test wicket. South Africa were 62–1 at the close. The pitch was cracked and showing uneven bounce. South Africa required a further 312 to win from 90 overs on the last day of the Test series for a 3-0 clean sweep.
Australian wicket-taker: Bollinger 1–11.

Day Five: On a deteriorating pitch South Africa lost 3 wickets in each session to be all out for 272. Australia achieved victory with only 11 deliveries left in the match when Graeme Smith, batting for 17 deliveries and 26 minutes with a broken hand and injured elbow, was bowled by Mitchell Johnson. Besides the heroics of Smith, Ntini faced 75 deliveries, Steyn 65 and Harris 43 to get South Africa within sight of a draw.
Australian wicket-takers: Siddle 3-54, McDonald 2-32, Johnson 2-49, Bollinger 2-53, and Hauritz 1-47.

== Twenty20 series ==
=== 1st Twenty20 ===
11 January
19:35 (D/N)
(scorecard)

Australia; 9/182 (20 overs)	v	South Africa; 130 (18 overs)
David Warner 89 (43); Dale Steyn 3/38 (4 overs)		Jean-Paul Duminy 78 (48); David Hussey 3/25 (4 overs)

Australia won by 52 runs
Melbourne Cricket Ground, Melbourne, Australia
Attendance: 62,155
Umpires: Bruce Oxenford & Rod Tucker (both AUS)
Player of the match: David Warner

- David Warner (Aus), Vaughn van Jaarsveld and Lonwabo Tsotsobe (both SA) all made their T20I debuts.

Australia won the toss and elected to bat.

=== 2nd Twenty20 ===
13 January
18:35 (D/N)
(scorecard)

South Africa; 5/157 (20 overs)	v	Australia; 4/161 (18.5 overs)
Jean-Paul Duminy 69 (41); James Hopes 2/29 (4 overs)		Michael Hussey 53 (33); Morné Morkel 2/32 (3.5 overs)

Australia won by 6 wickets (with 7 balls remaining)
Brisbane Cricket Ground, Woolloongabba, Brisbane, Australia
Attendance: 37,457
Umpires: Paul Reiffel & Rod Tucker (both AUS)
Player of the match: Michael Hussey

- Hashim Amla and Wayne Parnell (SA) both made their T20I debuts.

South Africa won the toss and elected to bat.

== ODI series ==
=== 1st ODI ===
16 January
14:15 (D/N)
(scorecard)

Australia; 8/271 (50 overs)	v	South Africa; 7/272 (49.3 overs)
Shaun Marsh 79 (97); Shaun Tait 2/43 (10 overs)		Jean-Paul Duminy 71 (93); Johan Botha 2/50 (10 overs)

South Africa won by 3 wickets (with 3 balls remaining)
Melbourne Cricket Ground, Melbourne, Australia Att: 39,731
Umpires: Ian Gould (ENG) & Bruce Oxenford (AUS)
Player of the match: Albie Morkel

Australia won the toss and elected to bat. Midway through the game, someone threw an inflatable ball onto the pitch. It rolled to Brad Haddin, who kicked it toward the officials, who popped it.

=== 2nd ODI ===
18 January
10:00
(scorecard)

Australia; 9/249 (50.0 overs)	v	South Africa; 6/244 (50.0 overs)
Shaun Marsh 78 (103); Ben Hilfenhaus 2/60 (10 overs)		Jacques Kallis 72 (102); Makhaya Ntini 3/39 (9 overs)

Australia won by 5 runs
Bellerive Oval, Hobart, Australia Att: 15,671
Umpires: Ian Gould (ENG) & Rod Tucker (AUS)
Player of the match: Shaun Marsh

- David Warner and Ryan Harris (Aus) both made their ODI debuts.

The Second One Day International of the 2008-09 South African tour of Australia was played at Bellerive Oval in Hobart on 18 January 2009. Australia won the match by five runs to level the series 1–1.

Australian captain Ricky Ponting won the toss and elected to bat. Australia got off to a poor start losing opening batman David Warner for 5. Local Tasmanian, Ricky Ponting, who was aided by dropped catches from Neil McKenzie when on 10 and Ntini on 50, scored 64 from 72 deliveries. Opening batsman, Shaun Marsh ably supported Ponting with a composed 73 from 103 balls.

=== 3rd ODI ===
23 January
14:15 (D/N)
(scorecard)

Australia; 269 (49.2 overs)	v	South Africa; 7/270 (46.3 overs)
David Warner 69 (60); Nathan Hauritz 2/60 (9 overs)		Herschelle Gibbs 64 (52); Johan Botha 3/32 (10 overs)

South Africa won by 3 wickets (with 27 balls remaining)
Sydney Cricket Ground, Sydney, Australia
Umpires: Ian Gould & Rod Tucker
Player of the match: Albie Morkel

=== 4th ODI ===
26 January
13:45 (D/N)
(scorecard)

Australia; 222 (48 overs)	v	South Africa; 2/223 (38.1 overs)
Ricky Ponting 63 (70); James Hopes 1/28 (7.1 overs)		AB de Villiers 82 (85); Dale Steyn 3/49 (10 overs); Makhaya Ntini 3/52 (10 overs)

South Africa won by 8 wickets (with 71 balls remaining)
Adelaide Oval, Adelaide, Australia Att: 25,419
Umpires: Ian Gould & Daryl Harper
Player of the match: AB de Villiers

=== 5th ODI ===
30 January
13:30 (D/N)
(scorecard)

South Africa; 6/288 (50 overs)	v	Australia; 249 (48 overs)
Hashim Amla 97 (117); James Hopes 3/44 (9 overs)		Michael Hussey 78 (96); Lonwabo Tsotsobe 4/50 (9 overs)

South Africa won by 39 runs
WACA, Perth, Australia Att: 18,002
Umpires: Ian Gould & Bruce Oxenford
Player of the match: Hashim Amla

- Wayne Parnell and Lonwabo Tsotsobe (SA) both made their ODI debuts.

== Tour matches ==
=== Western Australia (1 day match) ===
11 December
Scorecard

South Africans (South Africa); 2/185 (50 overs)	v	Western Australia; 4/215 (50 overs)
Hashim Amla 105* (118); Steve Magoffin 1/40 (10 overs)		Adam Voges 87 (78); Lonwabo Tsotsobe 1/12 (10 overs)

Western Australia won by seven wickets
WACA, Perth, Australia
Umpires: Jeff Brookes and Paul Wilson

- There were no fielding restrictions or limits on how many overs each bowler could bowl.

=== Western Australia (2-day match) ===
12–13 December
Scorecard

South Africans (South Africa)	v	Western Australia
8/320d (90 overs); AB de Villiers 129 (181); Justin Coetzee 2/56 (13 overs)		280 (71.5 overs); Matt Johnston 83 (107); Paul Harris 4/94 (15.5 overs)

Match drawn
WACA, Perth, Australia
Umpires: Andrew Craig and Paul Wilson

== See also ==
- List of Test cricket records
- List of Australia Test cricket records
