= Australian cricket team in 2008–09 =

This article contains information, results and statistics regarding the Australian national cricket team in the 2008-09 cricket season. Statisticians class the 2008–09 season as those matches played on tours that started between September 2008 and April 2009.

== Player contracts ==
The 2008-09 list was announced on 9 April 2008. Note that uncontracted players still are available for selection for the national cricket team.

Player	Age as at 19 March 2025	State	Test cap	ODI cap	ODI shirt
Ricky Ponting (captain)	50 years, 90 days	TAS	366	123	14
Michael Clarke (vice-captain)	43 years, 351 days	NSW	389	149	23
Doug Bollinger	43 years, 238 days	NSW			4
Nathan Bracken	47 years, 188 days	NSW	387	142	59
Beau Casson	42 years, 102 days	NSW			15
Stuart Clark	49 years, 172 days	NSW	396	153	8
Brad Haddin	47 years, 147 days	NSW	400	144	57
Matthew Hayden	53 years, 141 days	QLD	359	111	28
Ben Hilfenhaus	42 years, 4 days	TAS		161	29
Brad Hodge	50 years, 80 days	VIC	394	154	17
James Hopes	46 years, 146 days	QLD		151	39
David Hussey	47 years, 247 days	VIC		167	29
Michael Hussey	49 years, 296 days	WA	393	150	48
Phil Jaques	45 years, 320 days	NSW	395	158	5
Mitchell Johnson	43 years, 137 days	QLD	398	156	25
Simon Katich	49 years, 210 days	NSW	384	143	13
Brett Lee	48 years, 131 days	NSW	383	140	58
Shaun Marsh	41 years, 253 days	WA		165	9
Ashley Noffke	47 years, 323 days	QLD		164	22
Andrew Symonds	49 years, 283 days	QLD	388	139	63
Shaun Tait	42 years, 25 days	SA	392	162	32
Adam Voges	45 years, 166 days	WA		163	24
Shane Watson	43 years, 275 days	QLD	391	148	33

== Match summary ==
Format	P	W	L	D	T	NR
Twenty20 International	3*	2	-		-	-
One Day International	10*	1	5	-	-	-
Tests	9	3	4	2	-	-
Total	3	-	-	1	-	-

M = Matches Played, W = Won, L = Lost, D = Drawn, T = Tied, NR = No Result * = Not all games played yet

Series Summary

== Champions Trophy ==
Australia were due to play in the 2008 ICC Champions Trophy in Pakistan between 12 September and 28 September, however due to security concerns from several nations, the tournament was postponed until October 2009.

== Tour of India ==
Australia arrived in India in September for a 4 Test series against the Indian cricket team. A tour match in late September starts the tour and it concludes after the final Test in November.

=== Tour matches ===
==== Tour Match: 27–28 September, Jaipur ====
27–28 September
04:00 UTC
Scorecard
Report

Australia	v	(India) RCA Centre of Excellence
218 (77.1 overs); Simon Katich 73 (105); Shane Watson 30 (81); Gajendra Singh 5/58 (22.1 overs)		122 (52.2 overs); Robin Bist 34 (92); Gagan Khoda 33 (63); Doug Bollinger 3/9 (9.2 overs)

Match Drawn
Sawai Mansingh Stadium, Jaipur
Umpires: K Sharma and Vijendra Yadav

==== Tour Match: 2–5 October, Hyderabad ====
2–5 October
04:00 UTC

Indian Board President's XI (India)	v	Australia

Rajiv Gandhi International Stadium, Hyderabad
Umpires: Amiesh Saheba & Shavir Tarapore

=== Test series ===
==== First Test ====
Australian XI: Matthew Hayden, Simon Katich, Ricky Ponting (c), Michael Hussey, Michael Clarke, Shane Watson, Brad Haddin (wk), Cameron White, Brett Lee, Mitchell Johnson, Stuart Clark

9–13 October
04:00 UTC
Scorecard
Report

Australia	v	India
430 (149.5 overs); Michael Hussey 146 (276); Ricky Ponting 123 (243); Zaheer Khan 5/91 (29.5 overs)		360 (119 overs); Zaheer Khan 57 (121); Harbhajan Singh 54 (110); Mitchell Johnson 4/70 (27 overs)
6/228 dec. (73 overs); Shane Watson 41 (72); Brad Haddin 35 (61); Ishant Sharma 3/40 (14 overs)		4/177 (73 overs); Sachin Tendulkar 49 (126); VVS Laxman 42 (142); Stuart Clark 1/12 (11 overs)

Match Drawn
M. Chinnaswamy Stadium, Bangalore
Umpires: Asad Rauf & Rudi Koertzen
Player of the match: Zaheer Khan

- Series level 0-0

Test debut: Cameron White

==== 2nd Test ====
17–21 October
Test 1889

India	v	Australia
469 (129 overs); Sourav Ganguly 102 (225); Mahendra Singh Dhoni 92 (124); Mitchell Johnson 3/85 (27)		268 (101.4 overs); Shane Watson 78 (156); Amit Mishra 5/71 (26.4)
314/3 dec (65 overs); Gautam Gambhir 104 (138); Mahendra Singh Dhoni 68* (84); Cameron White 1/48 (8)		195 (64.4 overs); Michael Clarke 69 (152); Harbhajan Singh 3/36 (20)

India won by 320 runs
Punjab Cricket Association Stadium, Mohali
Umpires: Asad Rauf (Pak) and Rudi Koertzen (SA)
Player of the match: Mahendra Singh Dhoni (IND)

==== 3rd Test ====
29 October - 2 November
Test 1891

India	v	Australia
613/7 dec (171 overs); Gautam Gambhir 206 (380); V. V. S. Laxman 200* (301); Mitchell Johnson 3/142 (32 overs)		577 (179.3 overs); Michael Clarke 112 (253); Virender Sehwag 5/104 (40 overs)
208/5 dec (77.3 overs); V. V. S. Laxman 59* (130); Brett Lee 2/48 (17 overs)		31/0 (8 overs); Matthew Hayden 16* (29); Amit Mishra 0/2 (2 overs)

Match Drawn
Feroz Shah Kotla, New Delhi
Umpires: Aleem Dar (PAK) and Billy Bowden (NZ)
Player of the match: V. V. S. Laxman (IND)

==== 4th Test ====
6–10 November
Test 1892

India	v	Australia
441 (124.5 overs); Sachin Tendulkar 109 (188); Jason Krejza 8/215 (43.5 overs)		355 (134.4 overs); Simon Katich 102 (189); Harbhajan Singh 3/94 (37 overs)
295 (82.4 overs); Virender Sehwag 92 (107); Shane Watson 4/42 (15.4 overs)		209 (50.2 overs); Matthew Hayden 77 (93); Harbhajan Singh 4/64 (18.2 overs)

India won by 172 runs
Vidarbha Cricket Association Stadium, Nagpur
Umpires: Aleem Dar (PAK) and Billy Bowden (NZ)
Player of the match: Jason Krejza (AUS)

India won the series 2-0-2

== New Zealand in Australia (First Leg) ==
=== Test series ===
The first leg comprises two Test match series.

==== First Test: 20–24 November, Brisbane ====
20–24 November
00:00 UTC

Australia	v	New Zealand
214; Clarke 98, Hussey 35, Symonds 26; Southee 4-63, O'Brien 2-44, Ryder 2-7		156; Taylor 40, Flynn 39, Ryder 30; Johnson 4-30, Clark 2-46, Lee 2-38, Watson 2-35
268; Katich 131, Johnson 31, Symonds 20; Martin 3-69, O'Brien 2-58, Vettori 2-46		177; Taylor 75, Flynn 29, Ryder 24; Johnson 5-39, Clark 4-43, Lee 1-53

Australia won by 149 Runs
GABBA, Brisbane

Attendances - Day 1 - 12,498 Day 2 - 11,886 Day 3 - 11,347 Day 4 - 3022

Total - 38,753
Umpires: Rudi Koertzen (RSA) & Billy Doctrove
Player of the match: Mitchell Johnson (Australia)

==== Second Test: 28 November-2 December, Adelaide ====
28 November - 2 December
00:00 UTC

New Zealand	v	Australia
270; Redmond 83, Taylor 44, McCullum 30; Lee 4-66, Johnson 2-56, Hauritz 2-63		535; Haddin 169, Clarke 110, Ponting 79; O'Brien 3-111, Martin 2-110, Vettori 2-124, Redmond 2-47
203; McCullum 84, How 28, Extras 28, Redmond 19; Lee 5-105, Johnson 3-29, Hauritz 2-32

Australia won by an innings and 62 runs
Adelaide Oval, Adelaide

Attendances - Day 1 - 15,829 Day 2 - 18,116 Day 3 - 16,127 Day 4 - 6705

Total - 56,777
Umpires: Billy Doctrove & Rudi Koertzen (RSA)
Player of the match: Brad Haddin (Australia)

Australia won the series 2-0-0. New Zealand then goes home for a series against the West Indies and Australia will host the South African team. New Zealand returns to Australia on 29 January 2009 for the second leg.

== South Africa in Australia ==
South Africa arrived in Australia for a 3 Tests, 2 Twenty20's and 5 ODI's against the Australian cricket team.

=== Test series ===
==== First Test ====
17–21 December
Scorecard

Australia	v	South Africa
375 (98.5 overs); Simon Katich 83 (151); Makhaya Ntini 4/72 (19.5 overs)		281 (89.5 overs); Jacques Kallis 63 (111); Mitchell Johnson 8/61 (24 overs)
319 (97 overs); Brad Haddin 94 (136); Jacques Kallis 3/24 (14 overs)		414/4 (119.2 overs); Graeme Smith 108 (147); AB de Villiers 106* (186); Mitchell Johnson 3/98 (34.2 overs)

South Africa won by six wickets
WACA, Perth, Australia Att: Day 1 - 13,679. Day 2 - 10,515. Day 3 - 15,268. Day 4 - 10,550. Day 5 - 5301. Total - 55,313.
Umpires: Aleem Dar and Asoka de Silva
Player of the match: AB de Villiers

==== Second Test ====
26–30 December
Scorecard

Australia	v	South Africa
394 (113.4 overs); Ricky Ponting 101 (126); Dale Steyn 5/87 (29 overs)		459 (153 overs); Jean-Paul Duminy 166 (340); Peter Siddle 4/81 (34 overs)
247 (84.2 overs); Ricky Ponting 99 (169); Dale Steyn 5/67 (20.2 overs)		183/1 (48 overs); Graeme Smith 75 (94); Nathan Hauritz 1/41 (10 overs)

South Africa won by nine wickets
Melbourne Cricket Ground, Melbourne, Australia Att: Day 1 - 63,263. Day 2 - 42,814. Day 3 - 42,079. Day 4 - 19,847. Day 5 - 6343. Total - 174,246.
Umpires: Aleem Dar and Billy Doctrove
Player of the match: Dale Steyn

==== Third Test ====
3–7 January
Scorecard

Australia	v	South Africa
445 (136.2 overs); Michael Clarke 138 (250); Mitchell Johnson 64 (125); Paul Harris 3/84 (29.2 overs); Dale Steyn 3/95 (27 overs)		327 (120.5 overs); Mark Boucher 89 (171); Peter Siddle 5/59 (27.5 overs)
257-4d (67.3 overs); Simon Katich 61 (136); Ricky Ponting 53 (57); Morné Morkel 2/38 (12 overs)		272 (114.2 overs); Hashim Amla 59 (112); AB de Villiers 56 (144); Peter Siddle 3/54 (27 overs)

Australia won by 103 runs
Sydney Cricket Ground, Sydney, Australia
Umpires: Billy Bowden and Asoka de Silva
Player of the match: Peter Siddle

South Africa won the series 2-1-0

=== Twenty20 Series ===
==== 1st Twenty20 ====
11 January
(scorecard)

Australia; 182/9 (20 overs)	v	South Africa; 130 (18 overs)
David Warner 89 (43); Dale Steyn 3/38 (4 overs)		Jean-Paul Duminy 78 (48); David Hussey 3/25 (4 overs)

Australia won by 52 runs
Melbourne Cricket Ground, Melbourne, Australia Att: 62,155
Umpires: Bruce Oxenford & Rod Tucker (both AUS)
Player of the match: David Warner

Australia won the toss and elected to bat.

==== 2nd Twenty20 ====
13 January
(scorecard)

Australia; 161/4 (18.5 overs)	v	South Africa; 157/5 (20 overs)
Michael Hussey 53 (33); James Hopes 2/29 (4 overs)		Jean-Paul Duminy 69 (41); Morné Morkel 2/32 (3.5 overs)

Australia won by 6 wickets (with 7 balls remaining)
Brisbane Cricket Ground, Woolloongabba, Brisbane, Australia Att: 37,457
Umpires: Paul Reiffel & Rod Tucker (both AUS)
Player of the match: Michael Hussey

South Africa won the toss and elected to bat.

Australia won the series 2-0-0

=== ODI Series ===
==== 1st ODI ====
16 January
(scorecard)

Australia; 271/8 (50 overs)	v	South Africa; 272/7 (49.3 overs)
Shaun Marsh 79 (97); Shaun Tait 2/43 (10 overs)		Jean-Paul Duminy 71 (93); Johan Botha 2/50 (10 overs)

South Africa won by 3 wickets (with 3 balls remaining)
Melbourne Cricket Ground, Melbourne, Australia Att: 39,731
Umpires: Ian Gould (ENG) & Bruce Oxenford (AUS)
Player of the match: Albie Morkel

Australia won the toss and elected to bat.

==== 2nd ODI ====
18 January
(scorecard)

Australia; 249/9 (50.0 overs)	v	South Africa; 244/6 (50.0 overs)
Shaun Marsh 78 (103); Ben Hilfenhaus 2/60 (10 overs)		Jacques Kallis 72 (102); Makhaya Ntini 3/39 (9 overs)

Australia won by 5 runs
Bellerive Oval, Hobart, Australia Att: 15,671
Umpires: Ian Gould (ENG) & Rod Tucker (AUS)
Player of the match: Shaun Marsh

South Africa won the toss and elected to field.

==== 3rd ODI ====
23 January
(scorecard)

Australia; 269/10 (49.2 overs)	v	South Africa; 270/7 (46.3 overs)
David Warner 69 (60 balls); Nathan Hauritz 2/60 (9 overs)		Herschelle Gibbs 64 (52 balls); Johan Botha 3/32 (10 overs)

South Africa won by 3 wickets (with 27 balls remaining)
Sydney Cricket Ground, Sydney, Australia Att: 36,740
Umpires: Ian Gould & Rod Tucker
Player of the match: Albie Morkel

==== 4th ODI ====
26 January
(scorecard)

Australia; 222/10 (48 overs)	v	South Africa; 223/2 (38.1 overs)
Ricky Ponting 63 (70 balls); James Hopes 1/28 (7.1 overs)		AB de Villiers 82 (85 balls); Dale Steyn 3/49 (10 overs); Makhaya Ntini 3/52 (10 overs)

South Africa won by 8 wickets (with 71 balls remaining)
Adelaide Oval, Adelaide, Australia Att: 25,419
Umpires: Ian Gould & Daryl Harper
Player of the match: AB de Villiers

==== 5th ODI ====
30 January
(scorecard)

Australia; 249/10 (48 overs)	v	South Africa; 288/6 (50 overs)
Michael Hussey 78 (96 balls); James Hopes 3/44 (9 overs)		Hashim Amla 97 (117 balls); Lonwabo Tsotsobe 4/50 (9 overs)

South Africa won by 39 runs
WACA, Perth, Australia Att: 18,002
Umpires: Ian Gould & Bruce Oxenford
Player of the match: Hashim Amla

South Africa won the series 4-1-0

== New Zealand in Australia (Second Leg) ==
New Zealand returns for the second leg, consisting of a tour match against the Prime Minister's XI, five One Day Internationals (ODIs) against Australia and a Twenty20 International also against Australia.

=== ODI Series ===
==== 1st ODI ====
1 February 2009
Scorecard

Australia; 181 (48.4 overs)	v	New Zealand; 182/8 (50 overs)
Michael Hussey 49 (65 balls); Kyle Mills 4/35 (9.4 overs)		Ross Taylor 64 (97 balls); Nathan Bracken 3/35 (10 overs)

New Zealand won by 2 wickets on the last ball
WACA, Perth, Australia Att: 14,571
Umpires: Steve Bucknor and Bruce Oxenford
Player of the match: Kyle Mills

==== 2nd ODI ====
6 February 2009

Australia; 225/5 (50 overs)	v	New Zealand; 226/4 (48.5 overs)
Michael Clarke 98 (133 Balls); Iain O'Brien 2/48 (10 overs)		Grant Elliott 61 (75 Balls); James Hopes 2/30 (10 overs)

New Zealand won by 6 wickets with 7 balls remaining
Melbourne Cricket Ground, Melbourne, Australia att: (28, 251)
Umpires: Steve Bucknor (West Indies) and Paul Reiffel
Player of the match: Michael Clarke

==== 3rd ODI ====
8 February 2009
Scorecard

Australia; 9/301 (50 overs)	v	New Zealand; 269 (47.3 overs)
Brad Haddin 109 (114 balls); Iain O'Brien 3/68 (10 overs)		Grant Elliott 115 (124 balls); Ben Hilfenhaus 2/44 (9 overs)

Australia won by 32 runs
Sydney Cricket Ground, Sydney, Australia
Umpires: Steve Bucknor and Simon Taufell
Player of the match: Brad Haddin (Aus)

==== 4th ODI ====
10 February 2009

Australia; 4/247 (48.2 Overs)	v	New Zealand; 8/244 (50.0 Overs)
Michael Hussey 75(71)* David Hussey 79(96); Iain O' Brien 2/54		Ross Taylor 76(71); James Hopes 2/37

Australia wins by 6 wickets with 10 balls remaining
Adelaide Oval, Adelaide, Australia
Umpires: Steve Bucknor, Steve Davis, Paul Reiffel
Player of the match: David Hussey(Australia)

==== 5th ODI ====
13 February 2009

Australia	v	New Zealand

Brisbane Cricket Ground, Woolloongabba, Brisbane, Australia

Match was a washout

=== Twenty20 ===
==== Twenty20 ====
15 February 2009

Australia; 7/150 (20.0 overs)	v	New Zealand; 5/149 (20.0 overs)
David Hussey 41(39), Adam Voges 26(24), David Warner 23(15); Iain O'Brien 2/34		Brendon McCullum 61(47), Neil Broom 36(26); Peter Siddle 2/24, Nathan Bracken 0/16

Australia won by 1 run
Sydney Cricket Ground, Sydney, Australia
Umpires: Bruce Oxenford, Paul Reiffel, Rod Tucker
Player of the match: Nathan Bracken

== See also ==
- Australia national cricket team
- International cricket in 2008-09
