= South African cricket team in Sri Lanka in 2013 =

South Africa cricket team in Sri Lanka in 2013
| | Sri Lanka | South Africa |
- Dates: 20 July 2013 – 6 August 2013
| Captains | Angelo Mathews (last 3 ODIs); Dinesh Chandimal (1st 2 ODIs, T20I) | AB de Villiers (ODI); Faf du Plessis (T20I) |

One Day International series
- Results: Sri Lanka won the 5-match series 4–1
| Most runs | Kumar Sangakkara (372) | JP Duminy (165) |
| Most wickets | Ajantha Mendis (10) | Morné Morkel (7) |
- Player of the series: Kumar Sangakkara (Sri Lanka)

Twenty20 International series
- Results: South Africa won the 3-match series 2–1
| Most runs | Kumar Sangakkara (98) | JP Duminy (132) |
| Most wickets | Sachithra Senanayake (5) | Wayne Parnell (4); Morné Morkel (4) |
- Player of the series: JP Duminy (South Africa)

The South African cricket team toured Sri Lanka from 20 July to 6 August 2013. The tour consisted of five One Day International and three Twenty20 International matches. Sri Lankan ODI captain Angelo Mathews was suspended for the first two ODI matches due to maintaining a slow over-rate during the final match of the West Indies tri-nation series. The other members of the Sri Lanka team were fined 40% of their match fees. Dinesh Chandimal served as captain in Mathews' stead making him, at 23, the youngest ODI captain in the history of Sri Lankan cricket.

== Squads ==
| ODIs | | T20Is | |
| Sri Lanka | South Africa | Sri Lanka | South Africa |
|---|---|---|---|
| Angelo Mathews (c); Dinesh Chandimal (c); Lahiru Thirimanne; Tillakaratne Dilshan; Upul Tharanga; Kumar Sangakkara (wk); Mahela Jayawardene; Angelo Perera; Jehan Mubarak; Rangana Herath; Sachithra Senanayake; Ajantha Mendis; Lasith Malinga; Shaminda Eranga; Thisara Perera; Suranga Lakmal | AB de Villiers (c) & (wk); Hashim Amla; Farhaan Behardien; Quinton de Kock (wk); Faf du Plessis; JP Duminy; Colin Ingram; Rory Kleinveldt; Ryan McLaren; David Miller; Morne Morkel; Chris Morris; Alviro Petersen; Robin Peterson; Aaron Phangiso; Lonwabo Tsotsobe | Dinesh Chandimal (c); Kusal Perera; Mahela Jayawardene; Tillakaratne Dilshan; Kumar Sangakkara (wk); Lahiru Thirimanne; Jeevan Mendis; Angelo Mathews; Thisara Perera; Nuwan Kulasekara; Sachithra Senanayake; Lasith Malinga; Ajantha Mendis | Faf du Plessis (c); Farhaan Behardien; Henry Davids; Quinton de Kock (wk); AB de Villiers (wk); JP Duminy; Imran Tahir; Rory Kleinveldt; Ryan McLaren; David Miller; Morne Morkel; Chris Morris; Wayne Parnell; Aaron Phangiso; Lonwabo Tsotsobe; David Wiese |

== Tour Matches ==
=== Sri Lanka Cricket Board President's XI v South Africans ===
17 July
9:30
Scorecard

| South Africans; 271/6 (50 overs) | v | SLCB President's XI; 198 (44.5 overs) |
| JP Duminy 92 (100); Thisara Perera 2/49 (10 overs) | | Angelo Perera 46 (59); Chris Morris 3/27 (8 overs) |

South Africans won by 73 runs
Colts Cricket Club Ground, Colombo, Sri Lanka
Umpires: Rohitha Kottahachchi (SL) and Raveendra Wimalasiri (SL)

- South Africans won the toss and elected to bat.

== ODI Series ==
=== 1st ODI ===
20 July
14:30 (D/N)
Scorecard

| Sri Lanka; 320/5 (50 overs) | v | South Africa; 140 (31.5 overs) |
| Kumar Sangakkara 169 (137); Morne Morkel 2/34 (10 overs) | | Alviro Petersen 29 (31); Rangana Herath 3/25 (8.5 overs) |

Sri Lanka won by 180 runs
R. Premadasa Stadium, Colombo, Sri Lanka
Umpires: Richard Kettleborough (Eng) and Ranmore Martinesz (SL)
Player of the match: Kumar Sangakkara (Sri Lanka)

- South Africa won the toss and elected to field.
- Kumar Sangakkara recorded the highest ODI score ever made in Sri Lanka.

=== 2nd ODI ===
23 July
14:30 (D/N)
Scorecard

| Sri Lanka; 223/9 (49.2/49.2 overs) | v | South Africa; 104/5 (21/21 overs) |
| Dinesh Chandimal 43 (51); Morne Morkel 3/34 (10 overs) | | Alviro Petersen 24 (28); Rangana Herath 2/16 (4 overs) |

Sri Lanka won by 17 runs (D/L)
R. Premadasa Stadium, Colombo, Sri Lanka
Umpires: Ruchira Palliyaguru (SL) and Raveendra Wimalasiri (SL)
Player of the match: Dinesh Chandimal (Sri Lanka)

- Sri Lanka won the toss and elected to bat.
- Rain reduced Sri Lanka's innings to 49.2 overs. Rain initially reduced South Africa's innings to 29 overs. South Africa's innings was further reduced to 21 overs.
- Raveendra Wimalasiri stood in his first ODI
- Rod Tucker was ill

=== 3rd ODI ===
26 July
14:30 (D/N)
Scorecard

| South Africa; 223/7 (50 overs) | v | Sri Lanka; 167 (43.2 overs) |
| David Miller 85* (72); Ajantha Mendis 3/35 (10 overs) | | Thisara Perera 65 (49); Lonwabo Tsotsobe 4/22 (7 overs) |

South Africa won by 56 runs
Pallekele International Cricket Stadium, Pallekele, Sri Lanka
Umpires: Richard Kettleborough (Eng) and Ranmore Martinesz (SL)
Player of the match: David Miller (South Africa)

- South Africa won the toss and elected to bat.
- Angelo Perera (Sri Lanka) made his ODI debut.

=== 4th ODI ===
28 July
14:30 (D/N)
Scorecard

| South Africa; 238 (48.4 overs) | v | Sri Lanka; 239/2 (44 overs) |
| JP Duminy 97 (121); Ajantha Mendis 4/51 (9.4 overs) | | Tillakaratne Dilshan 115* (130); Lonwabo Tsotsobe 1/48 (7 overs) |

Sri Lanka won by 8 wickets (with 36 balls remaining)
Pallekele International Cricket Stadium, Pallekele, Sri Lanka
Umpires: Ruchira Palliyaguru (SL) and Rod Tucker (Aus)
Player of the match: Tillakaratne Dilshan (Sri Lanka)

- South Africa won the toss and elected to bat.

=== 5th ODI ===
31 July
14:30 (D/N)
Scorecard

| Sri Lanka; 307/4 (50 overs) | v | South Africa; 179 (43.5 overs) |
| Tillakaratne Dilshan 99 (110); Ryan McLaren 1/47 (10 overs) | | AB de Villiers 51 (51); Suranga Lakmal 3/24 (5.5 overs) |

Sri Lanka won by 128 runs
R. Premadasa Stadium, Colombo
Umpires: Richard Kettleborough (Eng) and Raveendra Wimalasiri (SL)
Player of the match: Tillakaratne Dilshan (Sri Lanka)

- Sri Lanka won the toss and elected to bat.
- * Rod Tucker was ill

== T20I Series ==
=== 1st T20I ===
2 August
19:00 (D/N)
Scorecard

| South Africa; 115/6 (20 overs) | v | Sri Lanka; 103/9 (20 overs) |
| JP Duminy 51 (52); Sachithra Senanayake 3/14 (4 overs) | | Kumar Sangakkara 59* (53); JP Duminy 3/18 (4 overs) |

South Africa won by 12 runs
R. Premadasa Stadium, Colombo, Sri Lanka
Umpires: Ranmore Martinesz (SL) and Raveendra Wimalasiri (SL)
Player of the match: JP Duminy (South Africa)

- South Africa won the toss and elected to bat.
- Imran Tahir and David Wiese made their T20I debuts for South Africa.

=== 2nd T20I ===
4 August
19:00 (D/N)
Scorecard

| South Africa; 145/6 (20 overs) | v | Sri Lanka; 123/7 (20 overs) |
| David Miller 36 (21); Sachithra Senanayake 2/18 (4 overs) | | Kumar Sangakkara 39 (35); Lonwabo Tsotsobe 2/17 (4 overs) |

South Africa won by 22 runs
Mahinda Rajapaksa International Stadium, Hambantota, Sri Lanka
Umpires: Ranmore Martinesz (SL) and Ruchira Palliyaguru (SL)
Player of the match: David Miller (South Africa)

- South Africa won the toss and elected to bat.

=== 3rd T20I ===
6 August
19:00 (D/N)
Scorecard

| South Africa; 163/3 (20 overs) | v | Sri Lanka; 164/4 (18.1 overs) |
| Faf du Plessis 85 (65); Suranga Lakmal 1/29 (4 overs) | | Tillakaratne Dilshan 74* (51); David Wiese 2/24 (4 overs) |

Sri Lanka won by 6 wickets
Mahinda Rajapaksa International Stadium, Hambantota, Sri Lanka
Umpires: Ranmore Martinesz (SL) and Raveendra Wimalasiri (SL)
Player of the match: Tillakaratne Dilshan (Sri Lanka)

- South Africa won the toss and elected to bat.

== Broadcasting Rights ==
| TV Broadcaster(s) | Country | Notes |
|---|---|---|
| TEN Sports | Pakistan; West Indies; Sri Lanka | Official Broadcasters of the tournament. |
| TEN Cricket | Bangladesh; India | |
| Super Sport | South Africa; Zimbabwe | |
