= Philip Amm =

South African cricketer (1964–2015)

Personal information
- Full name: Philip Geoffrey Amm
- Born: 2 April 1964; Grahamstown, South Africa
- Died: 10 September 2015 (aged 51); Grahamstown, South Africa
- Source: Cricinfo, 11 September 2015

Philip Geoffrey Amm (2 April 1964 – 10 September 2015) was a South African cricketer who played first-class cricket for Border and Eastern Province in South Africa from 1982 to 1998. He also played 138 List A matches from 1984 to 1998.
