= Ashwell Prince =

South African cricketer (born 1977)

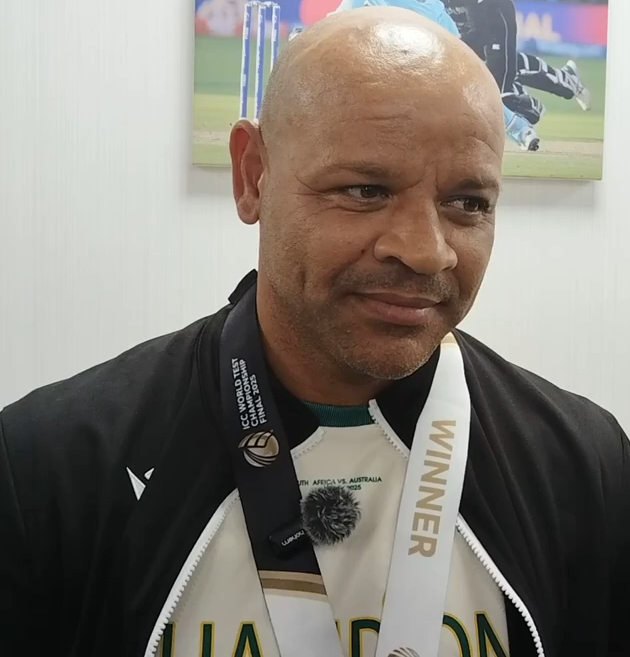
- Prince in 2025

Personal information
- Full name: Ashwell Gavin Prince
- Born: 28 May 1977 (age 49); Port Elizabeth, South Africa
- Batting: Left-handed
- Bowling: Right arm off break
- Role: Batsman

International information
- National side: South Africa (2002–2011)
- Test debut (cap 283): 22 February 2002 v Australia
- Last Test: 29 December 2011 v Sri Lanka
- ODI debut (cap 72): 9 October 2002 v Bangladesh
- Last ODI: 25 April 2007 v Australia
- Only T20I (cap 11): 21 October 2005 v New Zealand

Domestic team information
- Years: Team
- 1995/6–1996/97: Eastern Province
- 1997/98–2003/04: Western Province
- 2004/05: Western Province Boland
- 2006/07–2007/08: Cape Cobras
- 2008: Nottinghamshire
- 2008/09–2013/14: Warriors
- 2009–2015: Lancashire

Career statistics
Competition	Test	ODI	FC	LA
Matches	66	52	288	262
Runs scored	3,665	1,018	18,484	6,315
Batting average	41.64	35.10	44.43	32.55
100s/50s	11/11	0/3	45/90	4/34
Top score	162*	89*	261	128
Balls bowled	96	12	294	91
Wickets	1	0	4	0
Bowling average	47.00	–	44.75	–
5 wickets in innings	0	–	0	–
10 wickets in match	0	–	0	–
Best bowling	1/2	–	2/11	–
Catches/stumpings	47/–	26/–	220/–	120/–
- Source: ESPNcricinfo, 26 September 2017

Ashwell Gavin Prince (born 28 May 1977) is a former South African cricketer and captain who played all formats of the game for South Africa. At the age of 29, he became the first non-white man to captain the South African cricket team when he stood in for the injured Graeme Smith in two Tests. He took on the role of batting consultant with the Bangladesh cricket team in mid-2021 but resigned in early 2022. He was also a guest commentator with ABC Grandstand for the Australia-South Africa Test series in Australia.

Prince started his career with Eastern Province in the 1995/6 South African cricket season. Since then, he has represented Western Province, Western Province Boland, Cape Cobras, and Warriors in South Africa's domestic competitions. He has also had spells in England, first at Nottinghamshire and later Lancashire.

In 2002, Prince made his Test and One Day International (ODI) debuts for South Africa. He played 52 ODIs between 2002 and 2007, and 66 Tests between 2002 and 2011. All eleven of his international centuries came in Test cricket, in which he averaged 41.64. He originally announced his intention to retire from professional cricket at the end of the 2014 English cricket season, but stayed on for another season before announcing his retirement for the second time in September 2015.

== Career ==
=== Early career (1995–2001) ===
Ashwell Prince made his first-class debut on 27 October 1995, playing for Eastern Province B against Griqualand West B in the UCB Bowl. Two matches later, on 1 December, he played his first match for the full Eastern Province team. Opening the batting with Philip Amm, Prince was dismissed leg before wicket by fast bowler Roger Telemachus without scoring in each innings. Recounting the incident 14 years later, Prince remembered the match as his first-class debut.

Prince moved from Eastern Province to Western Province in the mid-1990s under the instruction of Duncan Fletcher who saw potential in him. Ashwell played two seasons for English cricket team Morecambe Cricket Club in his earlier career. Western Province won the 2000–01 SuperSport Series. After scoring 539 runs in the competition, Prince was named the club's player of the season. During the South African winter, Prince underwent an operation on his shoulder. His first match after the procedure was in February 2002 for South Africa A against the touring Australians.

=== International breakthrough ===
Prince made his Test debut in February 2002, against Australia at the Wanderers. His inclusion in the team was partly due to the quota system in South Africa. He however justified his spot in the team by making 49 and top scoring. In the third Test at Durban he narrowly missed out on a half century again but his 48 was influential in his teams victory.

In 2002–03 he struggled in series against Bangladesh and Sri Lanka and was dropped from the team. With good form in domestic cricket he came back into the team in 2004–05 and played two Tests against the Zimbabweans. In the second match he made his maiden Test hundred, finishing unbeaten on 139. This was enough to get him a ticket on the plane over to the West Indies and in the fourth Test at Antigua he made 131 and set a South African 5th wicket record partnership of 267 with Jacques Kallis.

The South Africans travelled to Australia the following summer and then met up again on home soil. Throughout both legs of the series Prince had trouble facing up against Shane Warne, being dismissed by him seven times in the six Test matches. Along with his debut series which was played against Australia Prince had fallen victim to Warne a total of eleven times (the highest of any South African batter in Test cricket). Despite this he still managed a couple of good innings. The first came in the third Test at Sydney where he again batted well with Kallis and made 119. Three matches later but this time in South Africa, Prince top scored in South Africa's first innings at the Wanderers and made 93.

During the Australia leg of the series the South Africans are said to have copped racial abuse with Prince being one of the victims. In the 1st Test at the WACA Ground in Perth during the 2005–06 season he alleged that sections of the crowd were calling him kaffir, a racial slur referring to "African slaves".

Later in 2006 New Zealand played an away series in South Africa and after they managed an 8 for 593 declared at Cape Town Prince made an unbeaten 108 to help his team escape with a draw.

With Graeme Smith injured, who usually led the team, and Jacques Kallis unavailable, Prince was named as South Africa's captain for their two-Test tour of Sri Lanka in July 2006. He was their first ever non-white and Haroon Lorgat commented "Ashwell's appointment is a non-event although the enormity and significance of it should not be missed". Despite making two 50s in the series his team struggled and lost 2–0. The first Test saw Mahela Jayawardene (who scored 374) and Kumar Sangakkara (287) share a world record partnership of 624, and the second was lost by just one wicket while took Muttiah Muralitharan took 22 wickets in the series.

In the ODI series which followed Prince lost the captaincy to Mark Boucher and it was a sign of things to come as he was not included in South Africa's squad for the Champions Trophy. Still in the Test team, he impressed during South Africa's home series against India, making a hundred at Durban after making 97 at Johannesburg. He finished as the highest run scorer for the series and his form continued against Pakistan, highlighted by an innings of 138 at Centurion. This form earned him a recall to the one day team and he was named in South Africa's 15-man squad for the 2007 World Cup in the Caribbean. South Africa were knocked out in the semi-finals, and Prince scored 107 runs from six innings in nine matches. He did not play an ODI after the 2007 World Cup and considering his ODI career he commented

If I look back at my one-day career my strike rate is probably a bit low [67.77] but then when I was selected in the team I was given a specific role. I would only bat if the team was 60 for 3. If we were 160 for 3, guys like [Justin] Kemp, [Mark] Boucher, or [Shaun] Pollock would bat. My role was to make sure we recovered when we were in trouble and if that's your role you can't strike at 100."

=== Test specialist (2007–2011) ===
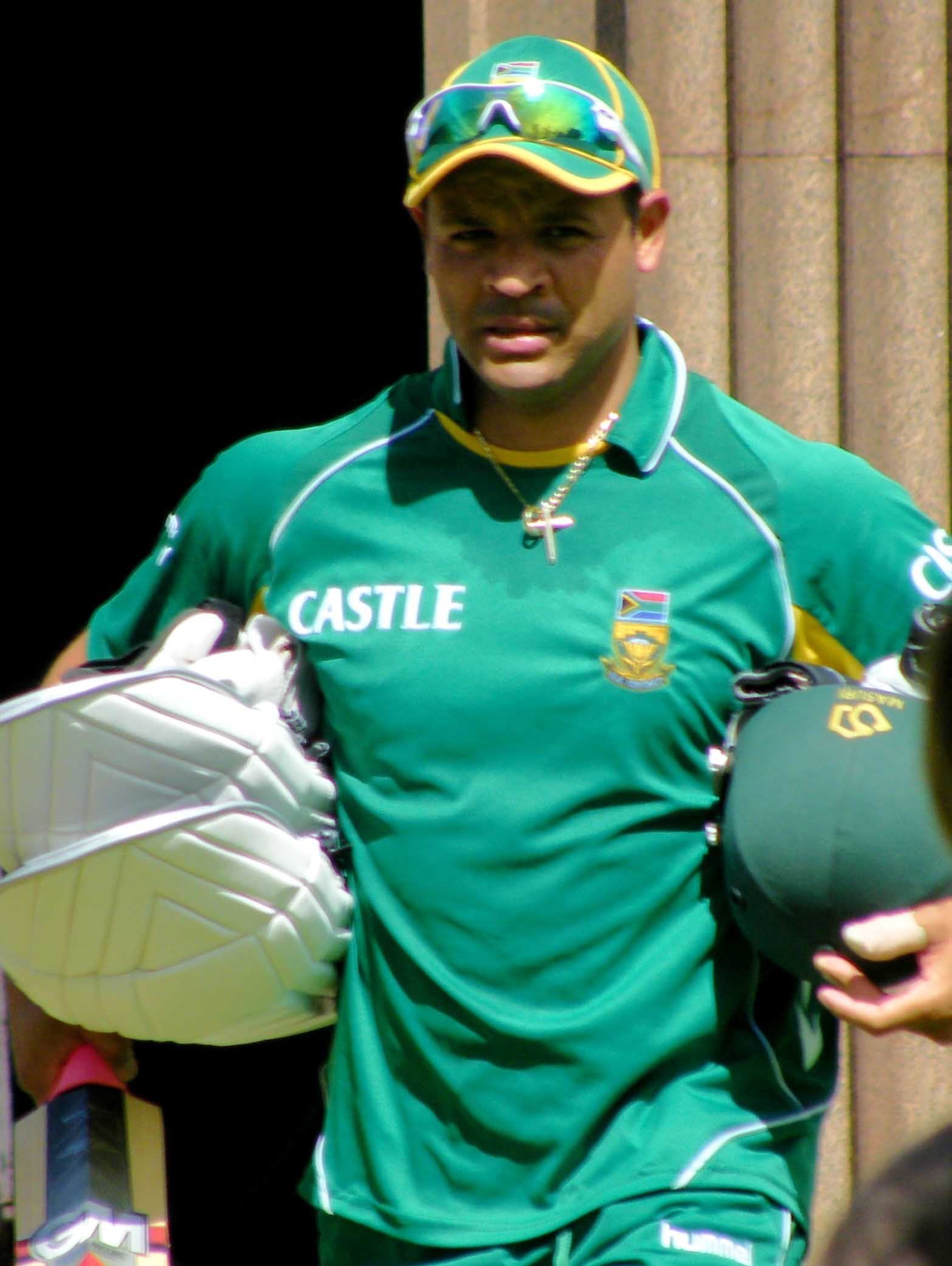
Prince during the tour of Australia in 2009

Prince started well in South Africa's tour of England in July 2008 with a score of 101 in his first innings at Lord's Cricket Ground. He scored 149 in the second Test at Headingley Carnegie. Back home, he scored a face saving 162 not out in the second Test against Bangladesh at Centurion, sharing in a South African record 6th wicket partnership of 271 with Mark Boucher.

Before the first Test of South Africa's tour of Australia in December, Prince suffered a broken thumb. Batsman JP Duminy was selected in his place. According to Prince, who in 2008 scored 900 runs at an average of 64.28 from 13 Tests including four centuries, he had been promised that once he recovered from his injury he would be back in the team. Instead South Africa persisted with Duminy, and Prince did not play another Test until the next series. Dropped from the first 12-man squad for the two Tests when Australia toured South Africa in February, Prince returned to the team for the third Test after captain Graeme Smith was injured and opener Neil McKenzie was dropped. Though he was used to batting in the middle order, Prince was asked to open in the absence of South Africa's settled opening pair. On his recall he was also asked to captain the team in place of the injured Smith, however the following day Cricket South Africa appointed Jacques Kallis to the role so that Prince could concentrate on his unfamiliar task of opening the batting. Opening with debutant Imraan Khan, Prince scored 150, his 11th Test century.

Prince signed a contract to play for Lancashire County Cricket Club the 2009 English season. He acted as cover for V. V. S. Laxman, the club's other overseas player, who was unavailable at times because he was playing in the Indian Premier League. Prince score his first century for Lancashire at the start of May during a match against Nottinghamshire. The knock came off 135 not out from 189 balls came on the final day of the four-day match and helped Lancashire from a score of 39/3 to draw the match. From five County Championship matches Prince scored 497 runs. South Africa's next engagement in Tests was in December when England toured. Despite his initial success as an opener, Prince struggled to adapt and was unhappy batting in an unfamiliar position. He opened with Graeme Smith throughout the four-match series, and managed just 97 runs from 7 innings, prompting ESPNcricinfo's Firdose Moonda to describe his performance as "technically inept".

The experiment with Prince opening lasted until the first match of South Africa's Test series against India in February 2010. For the second Test he returned to the middle order and Alviro Petersen partnered Smith at the top of the order. In six Tests as an opener, Prince average 27.44 runs per innings. In 2010, Lancashire signed Kumar Sangakkara who was unavailable due to international commitments until May. Due to his performance in 2009, Prince was signed as cover. After a run of low scores, Prince was dropped from South Africa's Test team at the start of 2012, and was replaced by Alviro Petersen for the third Test of South Africa's home series against Sri Lanka. When Cricket South Africa announced its central contracts in February 2012, Prince was included on the list and the convenor of selectors said that although Prince had been dropped from the Test team in January, he still remained part of the team's plan.

=== Lead up to retirement (2012–2014) ===
Prince signed with Lancashire in 2012, the year they defended their title in the County Championship. Prince managed four half-centuries before registering his first hundred of the season. Until that innings against Middlesex the last ten times Prince had reached 50 he had not converted it into a century. Prince finished the season with 1,008 runs from 15 first-class matches at an average of 43.82 including two centuries; Lancashire, however, were relegated to the second division of the Championship. Prince was the county's leading run scorer, and the only Lancashire player to score more than 1,000 runs that year.

In March 2013, Prince's central contract was not renewed. Later that month he signed a two-year extension of his contract with Lancashire, this time as a Kolpak player rather than an overseas player. Lancashire secured promotion back to the first division of the County Championship, and for the second year in a row was Lancashire's leading run-scorer in the competition, and this time registered three centuries on his was to compiling 1,169 runs.

Prince had announced that he would retire from professional cricket at the end of the 2014 season. Explaining the decision in a BBC interview, he said "It's for family reasons. My boys are getting big and starting to go to school. It's difficult to be in two countries for six months here and six months there." In June that year Prince registered his highest first-class score, managing 257 not out against Northamptonshire.

Prince reversed his decision to retire and returned to Lancashire during 2015. He was the county's highest scorer of runs for that season, with a total of 1478 runs at an average of just over 67.

=== Playing style ===
A left-handed middle order batsman, he has a high-batted stance and is strong through the onside. He is noted for his gritty style of batting and also for being an athletic fielder in the covers.

== Coaching career ==
In June 2021, Prince was appointed as the batting coach of the Bangladesh national cricket team by the Bangladesh Cricket Board (BCB). Prince replaced Jon Lewis, who served as batting coach from January 2021, his tenure covering the home series against West Indies and tours to New Zealand and Sri Lanka, as well as the home ODI series against Sri Lanka.

Prince resigned his position with the BCB early in 2022.

== Records ==
- South African 5th wicket record, 267 with Jacques Kallis vs West Indies in Antigua 2004–05
- South African 6th wicket record, 271 with Mark Boucher vs Bangladesh at Centurion 2008

Preceded by Graeme Smith	South African Test cricket captain 2005/6–2006/7 deputising for Graeme Smith	Succeeded by Graeme Smith
