= Paul Harris (South African cricketer) =

South African cricketer (born 1978)

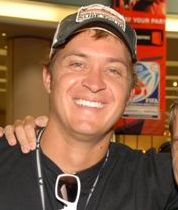
- Harris in 2009

Personal information
- Full name: Paul Lee Harris
- Born: 2 November 1978 (age 48); Salisbury, Rhodesia
- Nickname: Harro, Harri
- Height: 6 ft 6 in (1.98 m)
- Batting: Right-handed
- Bowling: Slow left arm orthodox
- Role: Bowler

International information
- National side: South Africa (2007–2011)
- Test debut (cap 301): 2 January 2007 v India
- Last Test: 2 January 2011 v India
- ODI debut (cap 91): 9 March 2008 v Bangladesh
- Last ODI: 14 March 2008 v Bangladesh
- ODI shirt no.: 2

Domestic team information
- Years: Team
- 2000–2002: Western Province
- 2002–2006: Northerns
- 2006–2007: Warwickshire
- 2004–2010: Titans
- 2010–2013: Lions

Career statistics
Competition	Test	ODI	FC	LA
Matches	37	3	112	51
Runs scored	460	–	1,630	67
Batting average	10.69	–	14.17	7.44
100s/50s	0/0	–/–	0/3	0/0
Top score	46	–	55	15*
Balls bowled	8,809	180	25,771	2,190
Wickets	103	3	368	59
Bowling average	37.87	27.66	31.61	27.27
5 wickets in innings	3	0	20	1
10 wickets in match	0	0	1	0
Best bowling	6/127	2/30	7/94	5/27
Catches/stumpings	16/–	2/–	43/–	21/–
- Source: CricketArchive, 6 February 2011

Paul Lee Harris (born 2 November 1978) is a Zimbabwean born former South African cricketer who played Test cricket as a left-arm orthodox spin bowler for the South African team between 2007 and 2011. He has also played domestic cricket for Northerns, Titans, Western Province and Warwickshire.

== Early life ==
Harris was born at Salisbury in Rhodesia (now Zimbabwe) where his father Mark was a member of the British South Africa Police until 1980. As a young child he moved with his family to South Africa and was brought up in Fish Hoek, Cape Town, South Africa. His father is a pastor in the Fish Hoek area.

Harris lives in Olympus, Pretoria, with his wife Marilet.

== Cricket career ==
While playing for Fish Hoek High School Harris was spotted by Western Province coach Duncan Fletcher who brought him into the provincial underage system. At Western Province Harris played alongside then-future England player Jonathan Trott.

Harris made his first-class cricket debut for Western Province B in 1998 in an UCB Bowl match against Eastern Province B in Port Elizabeth. It took over two years for Harris to play another first-class match. Due to intense competition for spinning roles, with Paul Adams and Claude Henderson being preferred over Harris, he only played two matches for Western Province, in March 2001 and February 2002.

After the 2001–02 cricket season, Harris transferred to Northerns. With the restructuring of South African domestic cricket in 2004 Harris played for the Titans in the SuperSport Series while continuing to play occasionally for Northerns in the South African Airways Provincial Challenges.

During the 2006 English cricket season, he joined Warwickshire under the Kolpak ruling after New Zealand spinner Daniel Vettori was injured. He immediately made his debut for the Bears in a Twenty20 Cup match against Worcestershire. He formed a spin bowling partnership with off-spinner Alex Loudon. After representing South Africa internationally he became ineligible to play as a Kolpak ruling player for Warwickshire.

=== International cricket ===
Following the retirement from international cricket of fellow spinner Nicky Boje in late 2006, he was given his first call-up for South Africa after Claude Henderson made himself unavailable. He played his first match in the third Test of the 2006–07 South Africa-India series against India at Newlands Cricket Ground. His career was off to an eventful start, taking four wickets in the first innings including the wicket of Sachin Tendulkar and is widely considered the best spinner for the Proteas since re-admission.

Harris began to show some more promise on the tour to Pakistan in October and November 2007 taking 12 wickets at an average of 20.66 including best figures of 5–73 in the first Test in Karachi.

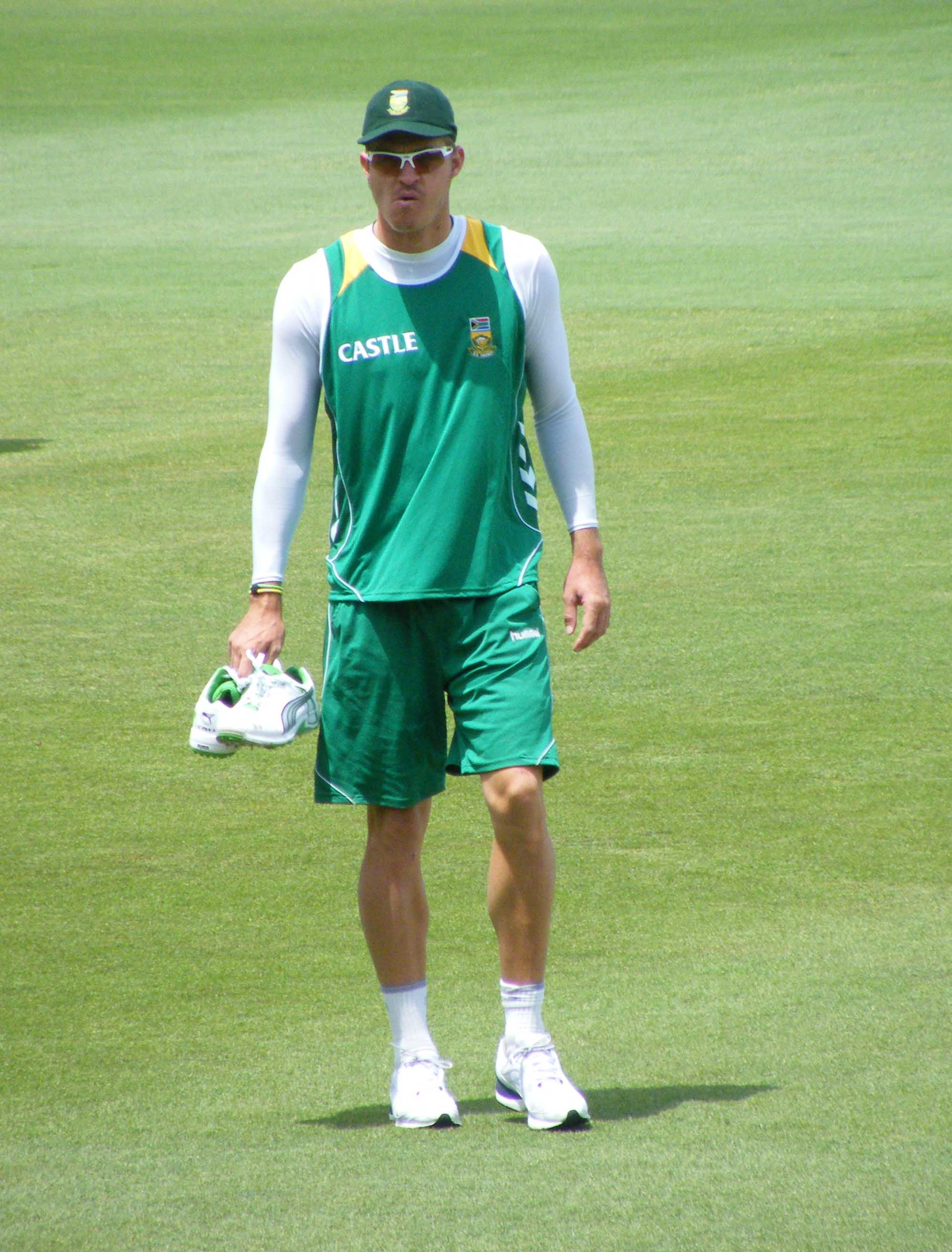
Paul Harris training at SCG in January 2009

In August 2007 Harris, returning to the country of his birth, led South Africa A to a win over Zimbabwe A, taking nine wickets in a man-of-the-match performance.

In March 2008 Harris was selected in the South African One Day International team that toured Bangladesh. Harris played three ODI matches against Bangladesh in Chittagong, Mirpur and Dhaka.

During South Africa's 2008 tour of England Harris's bowling style was derided by English commentator and former player Geoffrey Boycott as being "buffet" bowling. In December 2009, in response to this and other criticism of the lack of spin in his bowling, he joked that "most people will say I’ve only got the straight one".

Playing against Australia during their 2009 tour to South Africa Harris was key to ensuring a South African fightback in the third Test, taking nine wickets in the Protea's innings-and-twenty-run win. For his efforts, he was named man of the match.

In the second Test against India in February 2010 Harris bowled 12 wides, the most wides in a Test innings, bowling over the wicket on team instructions.

=== Honours ===
Harris was named in the Wisden Cricketers' Almanack's 40 best players of 2007. He was named South African Newcomer of the Year in the 2007 Mutual & Federal SA Cricket Awards.
