= Lonwabo Tsotsobe =

South African cricketer (born 1984)

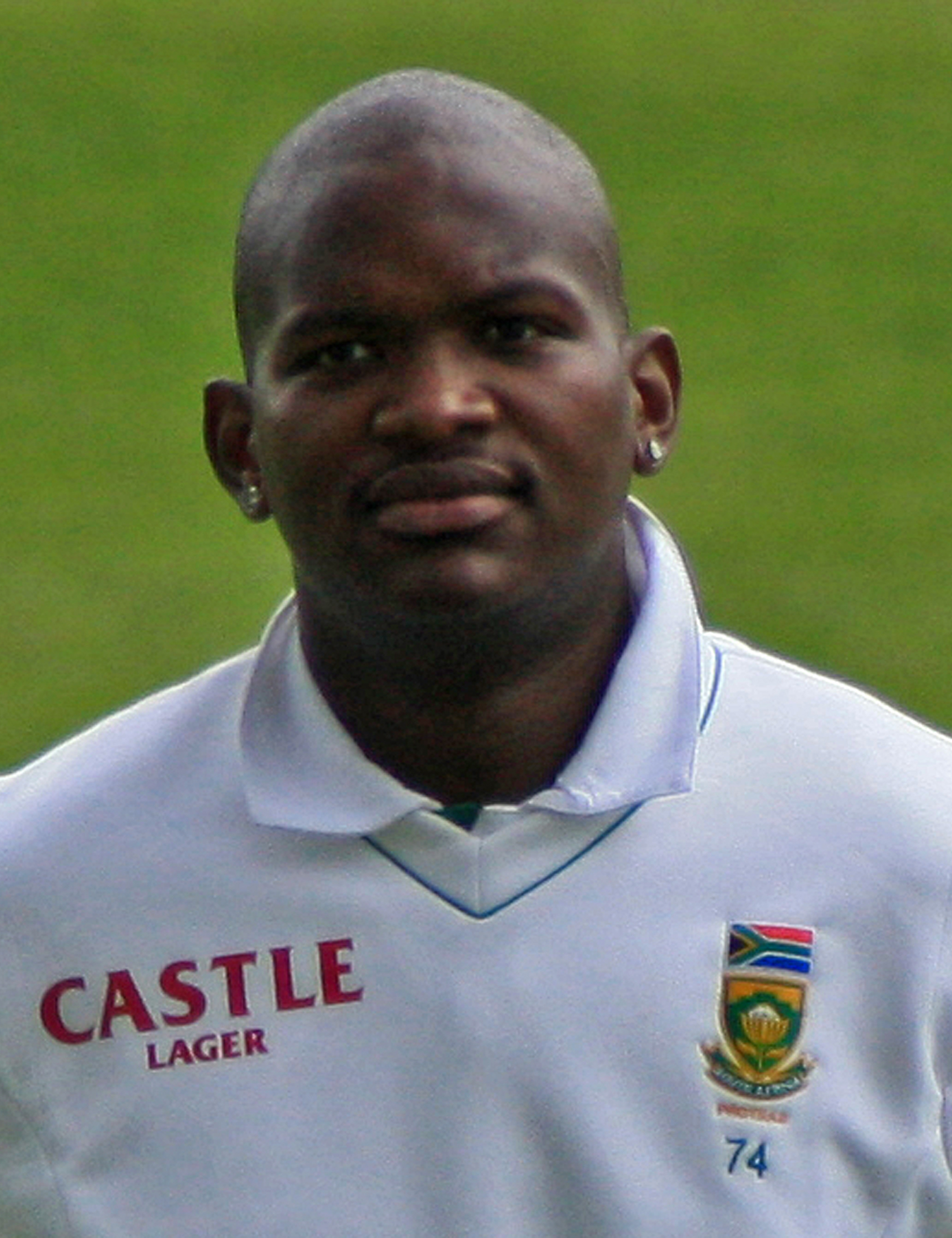
- Tsotsobe playing for South Africa against Somerset in 2012.

Personal information
- Full name: Lonwabo Lennox Tsotsobe
- Born: 7 March 1984 (age 42); Port Elizabeth, Cape Province, South Africa
- Nickname: Lopsy
- Height: 1.93 m (6 ft 4 in)
- Batting: Right-handed
- Bowling: Left-arm fast-medium
- Role: Bowler

International information
- National side: South Africa (2009–2014)
- Test debut (cap 309): 10 June 2010 v West Indies
- Last Test: 2 January 2011 v India
- ODI debut (cap 95): 30 January 2009 v Australia
- Last ODI: 11 December 2013 v India
- ODI shirt no.: 68
- T20I debut (cap 20): 11 January 2009 v Australia
- Last T20I: 27 March 2014 v Netherlands

Domestic team information
- Years: Team
- 2004–2006: Eastern Province
- 2006–2012: Warriors
- 2011: Essex
- 2012–2017: Dolphins

Career statistics
Competition	Test	ODI	FC	LA
Matches	5	61	56	129
Runs scored	19	55	268	107
Batting average	6.33	6.87	6.09	6.29
100s/50s	0/0	0/0	0/0	0/0
Top score	8*	16*	27*	16*
Balls bowled	870	2,964	9,423	6,024
Wickets	9	94	185	184
Bowling average	49.77	24.96	27.24	27.08
5 wickets in innings	0	0	5	1
10 wickets in match	0	0	1	0
Best bowling	3/43	4/22	7/39	5/28
Catches/stumpings	1/–	9/–	13/–	19/–
- Source: ESPNcricinfo, 16 January 2015

Lonwabo Lennox Tsotsobe (born 7 March 1984) is a former South African international cricketer who played South African national team and also significantly for the Dolphins in domestic circuit.

In November 2008, he received his first national call-up, with his selection for the test leg of the tour of Australia. He was later selected for the ODI leg as well.

In April 2011, Tsotsobe signed to play as an overseas player for Essex County Cricket Club in English county cricket. His form dipped and after taking five wickets in three first-class matches in the second division of the County Championship he was dropped from the team. In five one-day matches Tsotsobe managed eight wickets. He expressed his frustration at the situation, remarking that the time he spent with Essex was "the worst two months [of his] life".

In April 2016, he was charged by Cricket South Africa (CSA) with corruption in relation to matches in the 2015–16 Ram Slam T20 Challenge. He was suspended from all cricket as a result. In July 2017, following the completion of the corruption investigation, he was banned for eight years.

== International career ==
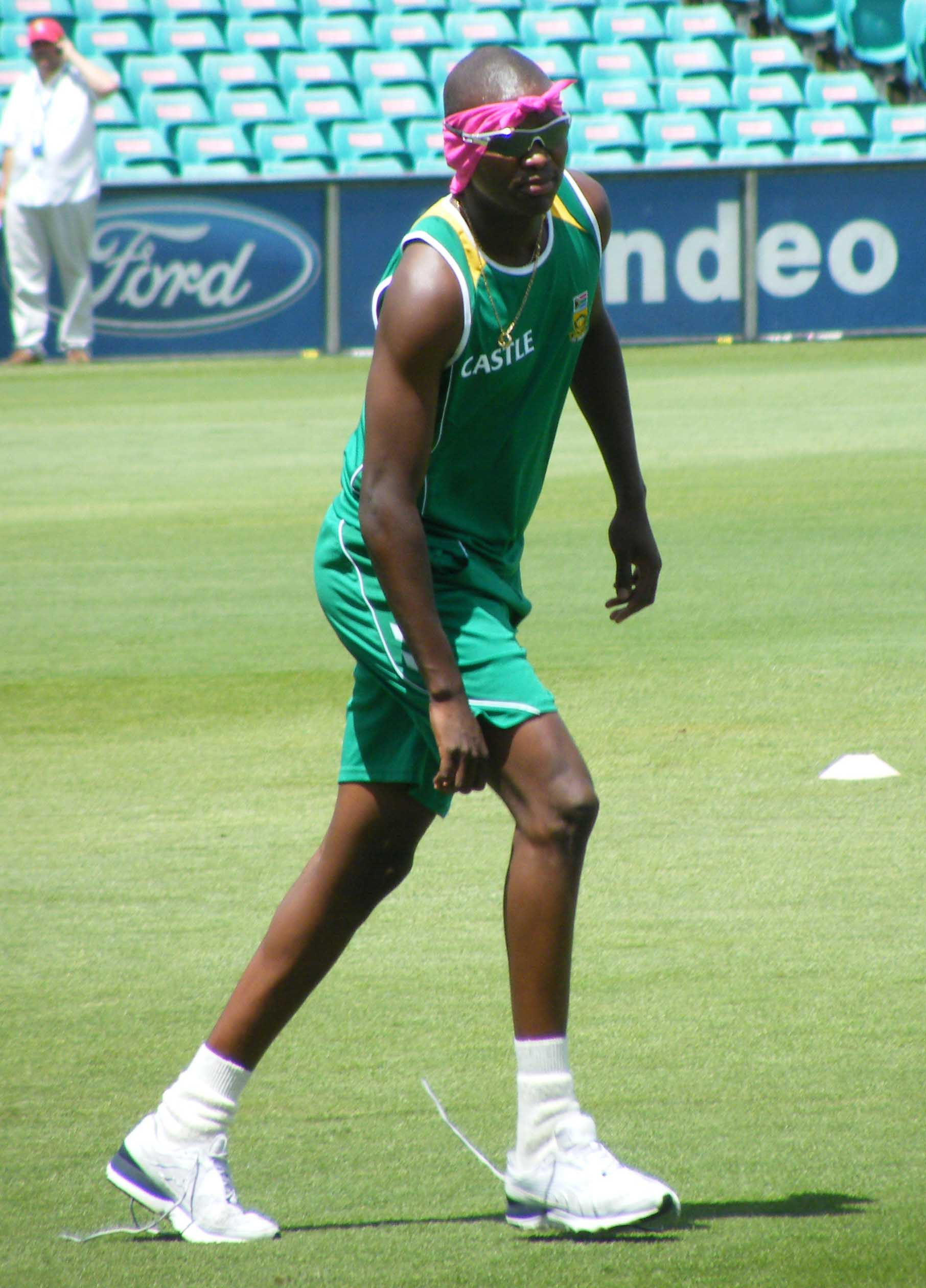
Lonwabe Tsotobe training at the Sydney Cricket Ground, 1 January 2009.

Tsotsobe made his international debut for South Africa in a Twenty20 International against Australia at the Melbourne Cricket Ground on 11 January 2009.

On 30 January, he took 4/50 from nine overs in his ODI debut against Australia. South Africa went on to win the match by 39 runs, and the ODI series by 4–1.

He made his Test debut in the first match against the West Indies in Trinidad in June 2010.

He then participated in the second Twenty20 International vs Zimbabwe in place of the injured Morné Morkel and after conceding two fours in his opening over he took the crucial wicket of Hamilton Masakadza. He was a member of the South African squad for the 2011 World Cup, in which South Africa reached the quarter-finals. Tsotsobe is said to have the ability to produce low economy rates and bowl deliveries between 120 and 135 km/h.
