= JP Duminy =

South African sports-person (born 1984)

Jean Paul Duminy
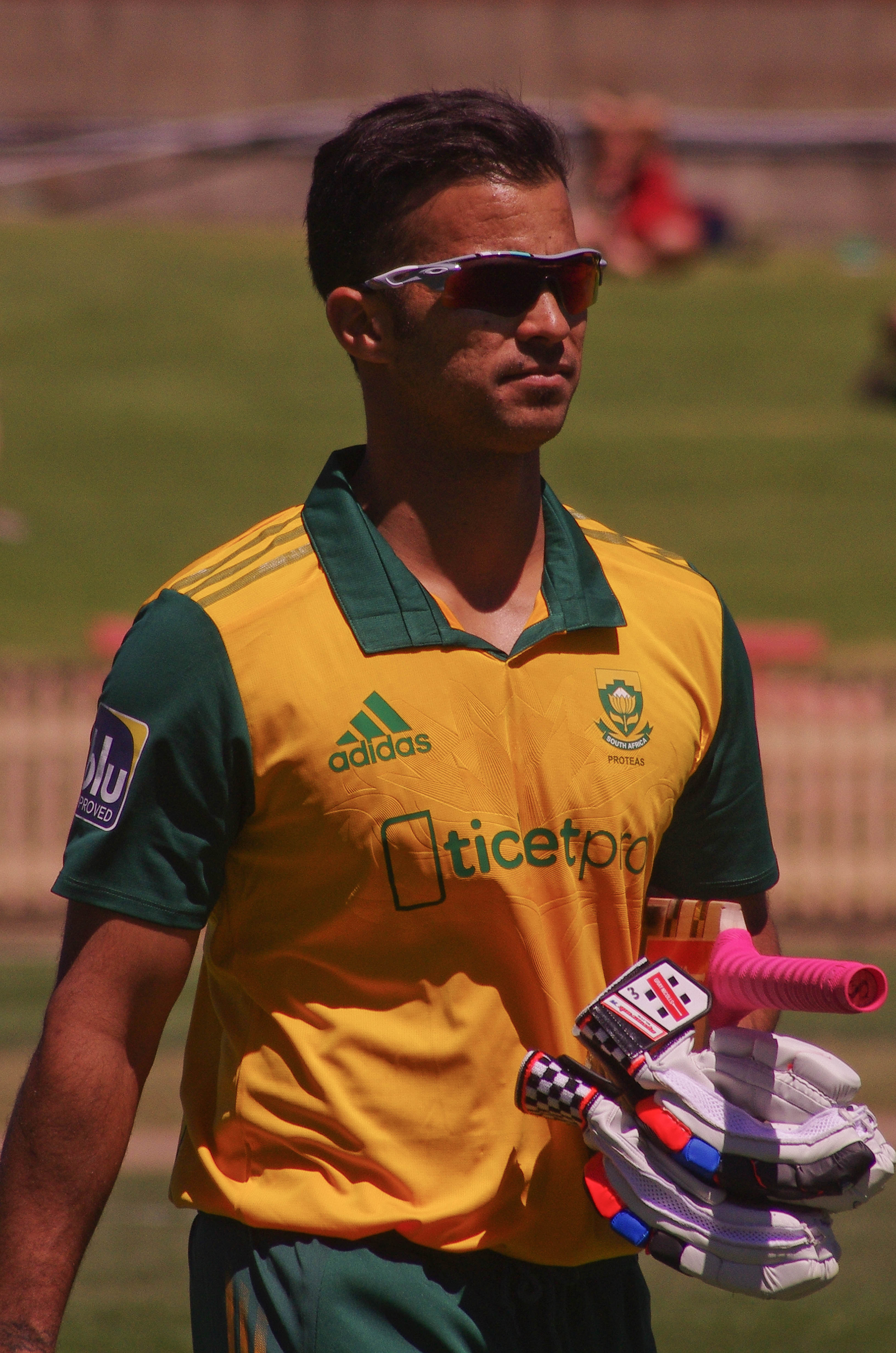
- Duminy in 2014

Personal information
- Full name: Jean Paul Duminy
- Born: 14 April 1984 (age 42); Strandfontein, Cape Town, Cape Province, South Africa
- Height: 5 ft 7 in (1.70 m)
- Batting: Left-handed
- Bowling: Right-arm offbreak
- Role: All-Rounder

International information
- National side: South Africa (2004–2019)
- Test debut (cap 302): 17 December 2008 v Australia
- Last Test: 6 July 2017 v England
- ODI debut (cap 77): 20 August 2004 v Sri Lanka
- Last ODI: 6 July 2019 v Australia
- ODI shirt no.: 21
- T20I debut (cap 30): 15 September 2007 v West Indies
- Last T20I: 24 March 2019 v Sri Lanka
- T20I shirt no.: 21

Domestic team information
- Years: Team
- 2001/02–2004/05: Western Province
- 2003: Devon
- 2005/06–2018/19: Cape Cobras (squad no. 24)
- 2009–2010, 2018: Mumbai Indians (squad no. 21)
- 2011–2012: Deccan Chargers (squad no. 21)
- 2013: Sunrisers Hyderabad (squad no. 21)
- 2014–2016: Delhi Daredevils (squad no. 21)
- 2018: Islamabad United
- 2019: Winnipeg Hawks
- 2019: Barbados Tridents

Career statistics
Competition	Test	ODI	T20I	FC
Matches	46	199	81	108
Runs scored	2,103	5,117	1,934	6,774
Batting average	32.85	36.81	38.68	46.08
100s/50s	6/8	4/27	0/11	20/30
Top score	166	150*	96*	260*
Balls bowled	2,703	3,513	463	5,434
Wickets	42	69	21	77
Bowling average	38.11	45.55	28.52	41.06
5 wickets in innings	0	0	0	1
10 wickets in match	0	0	0	0
Best bowling	4/47	4/16	3/18	5/108
Catches/stumpings	38/–	82/–	35/–	79/–
- Source: ESPNcricinfo, 14 April 2020

Jean-Paul Duminy (born 14 April 1984), more commonly known as JP Duminy, is a South African former international cricketer. He was vice-captain of the South Africa Twenty20 team. He is a left-handed batsman and a right-arm off spin bowler. Duminy, who is a Cape Coloured, was raised in the Western Cape and played domestic cricket for his home team, the Cape Cobras. Duminy made history when he was the first South African to take a hat-trick at a Cricket World Cup, which he did against Sri Lanka during the 2015 tournament.

In September 2017, Duminy retired from Test cricket after playing 46 matches between 2008 and 2017. In May 2019, Duminy announced his retirement from domestic cricket and in July 2019, he retired from all forms of international cricket.

== Early career ==
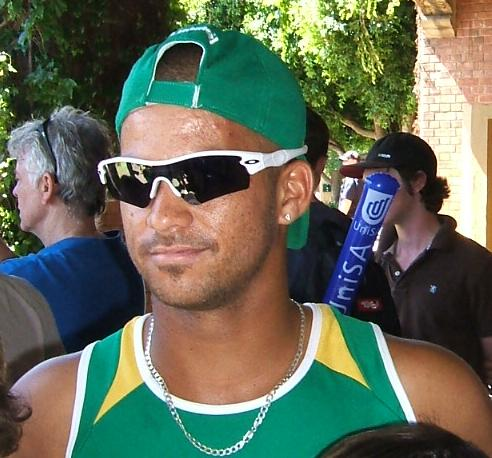
Duminy after a practice session in 2009

Duminy is a successful batsman generally occupying the top order, a skilled fielder and a useful change bowler. He became known during the South African under-19s tour to England in 2003 and in the 2003–04 domestic season, where he averaged over 72, two years after breaking into South Africa's Western Province side. Though he bowls less frequently in One Day Internationals, he has also found success with the ball, making his ODI debut in 2004 against Sri Lanka.

== International career ==
Replacing injured vice-captain Ashwell Prince, Duminy made his Test debut against Australia at the WACA in Perth on 17 December 2008, scoring 50* in the second innings and putting on an unbroken century partnership with AB de Villiers. His performance was lauded by numerous critics, including Peter Roebuck. In the next Test match, Duminy combined with the tailenders to score his maiden Test century, making 166 runs. South Africa were more than 200 runs in arrears when they lost their seventh wicket in the first innings. In the process, he and Dale Steyn put on a partnership of 180 and surpassed Graeme and Peter Pollock's South African ninth wicket partnership record against Australia. South Africa ended with a 62-run lead and converted it into a nine-wicket win. This sealed the series, the first time that South Africa had won a Test series in Australia, and Australia's first home Test series loss in 16 years. He also took his first Test wicket in the 3rd Test of the same tour.

During 2011 ICC Cricket World Cup, Duminy became the second batsman after Adam Gilchrist to be dismissed for 99 in a World Cup match. During 2015 ICC Cricket World Cup, Duminy became the first South African to take a hat-trick in a World Cup match. He dismissed Angelo Mathews with the last ball of an over, then dismissed Nuwan Kulasekara and Tharindu Kaushal with the first two balls of his next over. In that World Cup, he along with David Miller set the record for the highest fifth wicket partnership in ODI history when the pair scored 256 runs in an unbeaten partnership. On 5 November 2016, Duminy scored his fifth Test century during the first Test against Australia at Perth, in a partnership of 250 runs with Dean Elgar, at the time, the second highest partnership for South Africa against Australia.

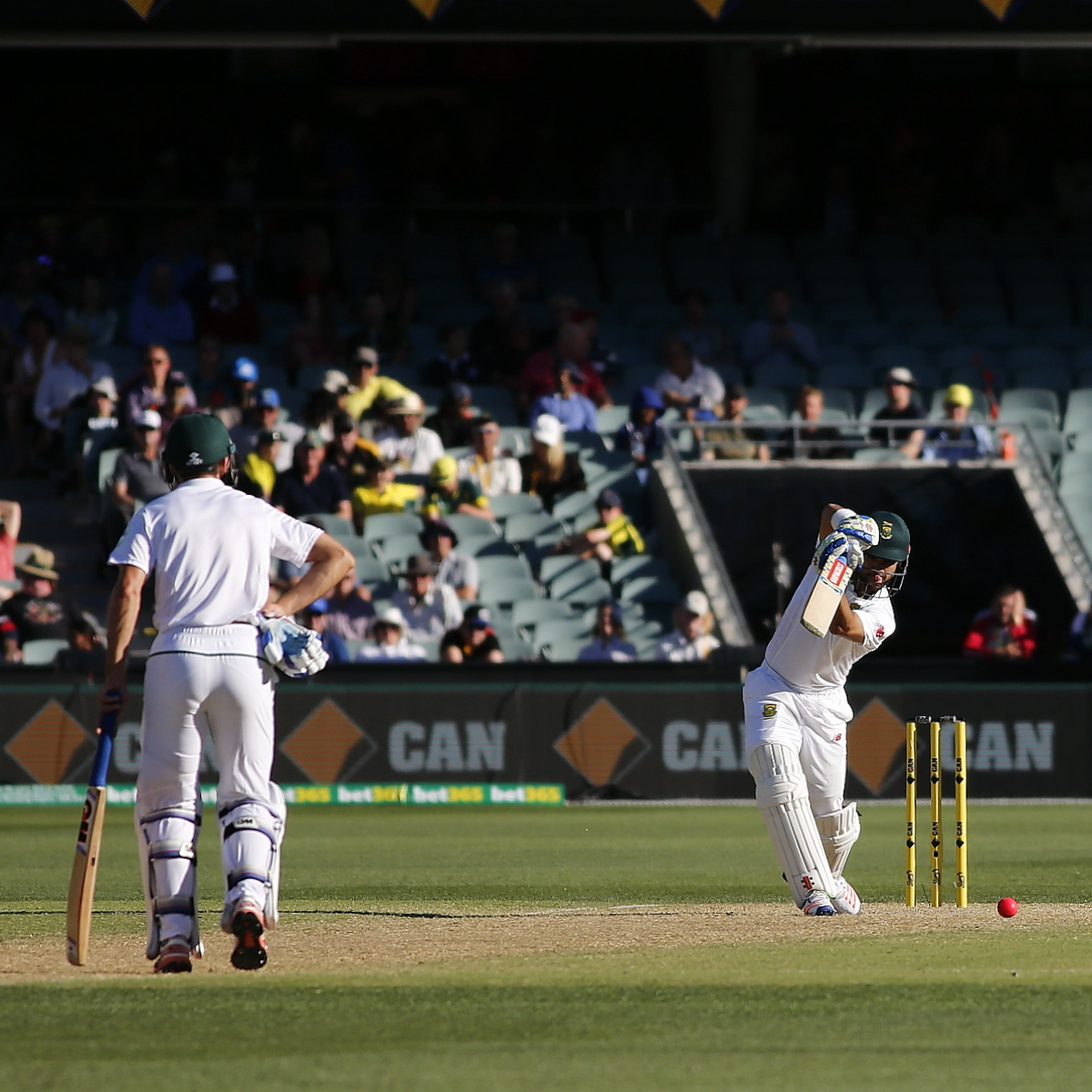
Duminy bats during the 2016 Adelaide Test

In October 2017, Faf du Plessis suffered an injury during the third ODI against Bangladesh and ruled him out of the T20I series. Duminy replaced him as T20I captain for that series.

In April 2019, Duminy was named in South Africa's squad for the 2019 Cricket World Cup. Duminy retired from international cricket after playing his team's last group stage match against Australia.

== Domestic and T20 franchise career ==
Duminy played in the Indian Premier League in 2009 after the Mumbai Indians franchise acquired him for US$950,000. He scored two half-centuries in the tournament. Duminy went on to play for Sunrisers Hyderabad and Deccan Chargers and was named the captain of Delhi Daredevils in 2015. He was bought back by Mumbai Indians for the 2018 season and later released ahead of the 2019 IPL auction.

He also played in the Pakistan Super League in 2018 for Islamabad United whom he captained to the league title. He captained Winnipeg Hawks to the 2019 Global T20 Canada title, with Duminy named Player of the Tournament during which he was the leading run scorer. His final T20 tournament was the 2019 Caribbean Premier League when he played for Barbados Tridents.

== Post-retirement ==
Since his playing retirement, Duminy has worked as a cricket coach. He was head coach of Paarl Royals for the inaugural SA20 season. From March 2023 to December 2024, Duminy worked with the South Africa national team as limited overs batting coach. As well as coaching he has also featured as cricket commentator for Star Sports.

== Personal life ==
Duminy was married to Sue with whom he has two daughters. He is a Christian, and returned to religion in 2013 during an international tour of Sri Lanka. On the 17th of February 2025 Duminy announced his separation from his wife, Sue.
