= 2015–16 Sunfoil Series =

Cricket tournament

- Dates: 17 December 2015 – 10 April 2016
- Administrator: Cricket South Africa
- Cricket format: First-class
- Tournament format: Double round-robin
- Champions: Titans (5th title)
- Participants: 6
- Matches: 30
- Most runs: Heino Kuhn (1,126)
- Most wickets: Hardus Viljoen (47)

The 2015–16 Sunfoil Series was a first-class cricket competition held in South Africa from 17 December 2015 to 10 April 2016. Titans won the tournament following a 10-run victory against Cape Cobras in the final round of the competition.

== Squads ==
Cape Cobras	Dolphins	Knights	Lions	Titans	Warriors
Hashim Amla; Jean-Paul Duminy; Sybrand Engelbrecht; Beuran Hendricks; Justin Kemp; Shaheen Khan; Rory Kleinveldt; Richard Levi; Tshepo Moreki; Justin Ontong; Wayne Parnell; Dane Paterson; Keegan Petersen; Robin Peterson; Vernon Philander; Dane Piedt; Andrew Puttick; Omphile Ramela; Mthokozisi Shezi; Dale Steyn; Stiaan van Zyl; Dane Vilas; Lizaad Williams	Morne van Wyk; Craig Alexander; Cody Chetty; Cameron Delport; Robbie Frylinck; Imran Tahir; Imraan Khan; Ryan McLaren; Keshav Maharaj; David Miller; Calvin Savage; Daryn Smit; Thandi Tshabalala; Vaughn van Jaarsveld; Divan van Wyk; Khaya Zondo	Gerhardt Abrahams; Tumelo Bodibe; Werner Coetsee; Corné Dry; Dillon du Preez; Michael Erlank; Quinton Friend; Reeza Hendricks; Tumi Masekela; Duanne Olivier; Obus Pienaar; Diego Rosier; Rilee Rossouw; Rudi Second; Letlotlo Sesele; Malusi Siboto; Pite van Biljon; Shadley van Schalkwyk	Stephen Cook; Temba Bavuma; Devon Conway; Bjorn Fortuin; Dominic Hendricks; Sean Jamison; Eddie Leie; Neil McKenzie; Pumelela Matshikwe; Alviro Petersen; Aaron Phangiso; Shaylen Pillay; Nono Pongolo; Dwaine Pretorius; Kagiso Rabada; Jean Symes; Thami Tsolekile; Lonwabo Tsotsobe; Rassie van der Dussen; Hardus Viljoen	Qaasim Adams; Farhaan Behardien; Junior Dala; Henry Davids; Theunis de Bruyn; Quinton de Kock; Marchant de Lange; AB de Villiers; Faf du Plessis; Dean Elgar; Heino Kuhn; Ethy Mbhalati; Sammy Mofokeng; Albie Morkel; Morne Morkel; Chris Morris; Mangaliso Mosehle; Rowan Richards; Tabraiz Shamsi; Graeme van Buuren; Shaun von Berg; David Wiese	Colin Ackermann; Andrew Birch; Gihahn Cloete; Clyde Fortuin; Ayabulela Gqamane; Simon Harmer; Colin Ingram; Christiaan Jonker; Sisanda Magala; Lundi Mbane; Thandolwethu Mnyaka; Michael Price; Somila Seyibokwe; JJ Smuts; Rusty Theron; Yaseen Valli; Basheeru-Deen Walters; David White

== Points table ==
Teams	Pld	W	L	D	A	Pts	Q
Titans	10	6	1	3	0	133	0.20
Lions	10	4	2	4	0	109	0.30
Knights	10	5	5	0	0	109	0.04
Cape Cobras	10	3	5	2	0	92	0.84
Dolphins	10	3	3	3	1	92	0.54
Warriors	10	2	7	0	1	71	0.04

== Group stage ==
Visitor team →	Cape Cobras	Dolphins	Knights	Lions	Titans	Warriors
Home team ↓	Cape Cobras	Dolphins	Knights	Lions	Titans	Warriors
Cape Cobras		Cape Cobras; 9 Wickets	Knights; Inn & 102 Runs	Match drawn	Titans; 10 Runs	Cobras; Inn & 12 Runs
Dolphins	Match drawn		Dolphins; 118 Runs	Match drawn	Match drawn	Abandoned
Knights	Knights; 3 Wickets	Dolphins; 63 Runs		Lions; 45 Runs	Knights; 5 Wickets	Warriors; 9 Wickets
Lions	Lions; Inn & 78 Runs	Lions; 79 Runs	Knights; 10 Wickets		Match drawn	Lions; 203 Runs
Titans	Titans; 10 Wickets	Titans; 4 Wickets	Titans; 359 Runs	Match drawn		Titans; 66 Runs
Warriors	Cobras; 148 Runs	Dolphins; Inn & 54 Runs	Knights; 4 Wickets	Warriors; Inn & 101 Runs	Titans; 8 Wickets	

Home team won	Visitor team won	Match drawn	Match abandoned

Note: Click on the results to see match summary.

== Fixtures ==
=== Round 1 ===
17–20 December
Scorecard

(home team) Cape Cobras	v	Knights
243 (73 overs); Petersen 54(66); D Olivier 4/88 (14 overs)		9/491d (154 overs); Coetsee 103 (179); D Piedt 4/121 (44 overs)
146 (69 overs); Duminy 35(84) van Schlkwyk 5/45 (17 overs)

Knights won by an inning and 102 runs
Newlands Stadium, Cape Town
Umpires: Ryan Hendricks (RSA) and Brad White (RSA)
Player of the match: Werner Coetsee (KNG)

- Cape cobras won the toss and elected to bat.

17–20 December
Scorecard

(home team) Lions	v	Dolphins
214 (90.4 overs); Bavuma 57 (114); Savage 5/62 (28 overs)		141 (52.2 overs); D Miller 62 (123); Pretorius 4/37 (16.2 overs)
8/316 (104 overs) van der Dussen 98 (255); Pillans 4/76 (26 overs)		310 (106.5 overs); Khan 101 (183); Viljoen 6/113 (30.5 overs)

Lions won by 79 runs
New Wanderers, Cricket Stadium, Johannesburg
Umpires: Clifford Isaacs (RSA) and Gerrie Pienaar (RSA)
Player of the match: Hardus Viljoen (Dolphins)

- Lions won the toss and elected to bat

17–20 December
Scorecard

(home team) Titans	v	Warriors
171 (46.1 overs); Theunis de Bruyn 48 (73); Walters 3/39 (12 overs)		265 (87.4 overs); Ingram 74 (123); Rickards 3/72 (21 overs)
369 (111.2 overs); Kuhn 141 (226); Walters 5/49 (20.2 overs)		209 (60.1 overs); Fortuin 72 (118); Wiese 3/28 (12.1 overs)

Titans won by 66 runs
Centurion Park, Centurion
Umpires: A Holdstock (RSA) and Dennis Smith (RSA)
Player of the match: Heino Kuhn (Titans)

- Warriors won the toss and elected to field

=== Round 2 ===
27–30 December
Scorecard

Dolphins	v	Knights (home team)
306 (105.2 overs); Smit 123* (217) du Preez 3/40 (20 overs)		257 (77.3 overs); Second 122 (194); Maharaj 5/54 (30 overs)
106 (46.5 overs) van Jaarsveld 28 (24); Budaza 4/31 (8.5 overs)		92 (36.3 overs); Hendricks 57 (108); Tahir 8/42 (15.3 overs)

Dolphins win by 63 runs
Diamond Oval, Kimberley
Umpires: A Holdstock (RSA) and Bongami Jele (RSA)
Player of the match: Imran Tahir (Dolphins)

- Dolphins won the toss and elected to bat.

27–30 December
Scorecard

(home team) Lions	v	Warriors
291 (85.2 overs); Adams 87 (159); Birch 3/33 (17.2 overs)		163 (54.5 overs); White 33 (90); Viljoen 6/44 (15.5 overs)
4/294d (85 overs); Cook 168* (256); Ackermann 2/63 (18 overs)		219 (67.2 overs); Ackermann 89 (189); Viljoen 4/79 (20.2 overs)

Lions won by 203 runs
New Wanderers Stadium, Johannesburg
Umpires: Allahudien Paleker (RSA) and Brad White (RSA)
Player of the match: Stephen Cook (Lions)

- Warriors won the toss and elected to field.

27–30 December
Scorecard

(home team) Titans	v	Cape Cobras
362 (93 overs) de Kock 117 (133); Williams 4/47 (22 overs)		107 (34.5 overs); Ontong 36* (49); Shamsi 5/22 (8.5 overs)
0/66 (6.4 overs); Kuhn 32* (18); Williams 0/19 (2 overs)		320 (89.4 overs); Puttick 92 (202); Shamsi 7/63 (32.4 overs)

Titans won by 10 wickets
Willowmoore Park, Benoni
Umpires: S George (RSA) and Dennis Smith (RSA)
Player of the match: Tabraiz Shamsi (Titans)

- Titans won the toss and elected to bat.

=== Round 3 ===
7–10 January
Scorecard

(home team) Dolphins	v	Warriors

No result
City Oval, Pietermaritzburg

- Warriors won the toss and elected to field.

7–10 January
Scorecard

(home team) Cape Cobras	v	Lions
4/570d (145 overs); Duminy 260* (409); Viljoen 1/61 (26 overs)		252 (98 overs); Stephen Cook 118 (260); Peterson 5/62 (33 overs)
		9/287 (140 overs); Pretorius 101 (178); Peterson 4/88 (46 overs)

Match drawn
Boland Park, Paarl
Umpires: A Holdstock (RSA) and Dennis Smith (RSA)

- Cape Cobras won the toss and elected to bat.

7–10 January
Scorecard

Titans	v	Knights (home team)
141 (45.1 overs); Behardien 34 (50); Olivier 5/42 (14.1 overs)		76 (33.4 overs); Rossouw 17 (19); Mbhalati 5/29 (6.4 overs)
187 (57.1 overs); Adams 69 (132); Budaza 3/26 (11.1 overs)		5/255 (52.2 overs); Hendricks 69 (88) de Lange 3/64 (14.2 overs)

Knights won by 5 wickets
Mangaung Oval, Bloemfontein
Umpires: Lubabalo Geuma (RSA) and Brad White (RSA)
Player of the match: Rilee Rossouw & Duanne Olivier (Knights)

- Titans won the toss and elected to bat.

=== Round 4 ===
14–17 January
Scorecard

Lions	v	Knights (home team)
264 (109.1 overs); D Hendricks 80 (185); Tumi Masekela 7/38 (24.1 overs)		221 (59.1 overs); Mnyanda 46 (64); Pretorius 3/35 (17 overs)
94 (26.5 overs); Stephen Cook 29 (54); Siboto 7/44 (13 overs)		92 (44.5 overs); R Hendricks 20 (47); Pretorius 3/37 (11.5 overs)

Lions won by 45 runs
Diamond Oval, Kimberley
Umpires: Bongami Jele (RSA) and Brad White (RSA)
Player of the match: Tumi Masekela & Malusi Siboto (Lions)

- Lions won the toss and elected to bat.

14–17 January
Scorecard

Dolphins	v	Titans (home team)
357 (91.4 overs); Smit 85 (111); Mbhalati 4/48 (20 overs)		440 (125.2 overs); Kuhn 129 (219); Maharaj 5/103 (41.2 overs)
255 (87.1 overs); Khan 107 (231); Shamsi 3/38 (20 overs)		6/175 (33.5 overs); Kuhn 62 (57); Maharaj 2/64 (13.5 overs)

Titans won by 4 wickets
Willowmoore Park, Benoni
Umpires: Allahudien Paleker (RSA) and Gerrie Pienaar (RSA)
Player of the match: Heino Kuhn (Titans)

- Titans won the toss and elected to field.

14–17 January
Scorecard

Cape Cobras	v	Warriors (home team)
325 (110.2 overs); Ontong 98 (189); Harmer 8/60 (33.2 overs)		129 (33 overs); Gqamane 37* (53); Kleinveldt 4/41 (11.3 overs)
130 (44.2 overs); Ontong 28 (37); Walters 3/20 (11 overs)		178 (51.5 overs); Ackermann 82 (140); Kleinveldt 5/30 (10.5 overs)

Cape cobras win by 148 runs
St George's Park, Port Elizabeth
Umpires: Lubabalo Geuma (RSA) and Dennis Smith (RSA)
Player of the match: Justin Ontong (Cap Cobras) Simon Harmer (Warriors)

- Cape cobras won the toss and elected to bat.

=== Round 5 ===
21–24 January
Scorecard

(home team) Dolphins	v	Cape Cobras
405 (128.3 overs); Smit† 64 (146); Justin Ontong 2/89 (35 overs)		216 (86.2 overs); Omphile Ramela 89 (208); Keshav Maharaj 5/62 (32.2 overs)
		(F) 6/361 (132 overs); Omphile Ramela 107 (299); Keshav Maharaj 2/130 (61 overs)

Match drawn
Kingsmead, Durban
Umpires: SD Harris and Bongani Jele
Player of the match: Omphile Ramela

- Dolphins won the toss and elected to bat.

21–24 January
Scorecard

Titans	v	Lions (home team)
294 (75.4 overs); Farhaan Behardien 108 (156); Dwaine Pretorius 6/66 (18.4 overs)		295 (80.3 overs); Alviro Petersen 203 (252); Marchant de Lange 4/49 (13.3 overs)
8/169 (47.4 overs); Theunis de Bruyn 62 (90); Hardus Viljoen 6/75 (21.4 overs)

Match drawn
Senwes Park, Potchefstroom
Umpires: JD Cloete and Lubabalo Gcuma
Player of the match: Alviro Petersen

- Titans won the toss and elected to bat.

21–24 January
Scorecard

(home team) Warriors	v	Knights
252 (99.1 overs); Colin Ingram 89 (162); Malusi Siboto 6/54 (25 overs)		270 (114.5 overs); Pite van Biljon 96 (238); Basheeru-Deen Walters 3/42 (15 overs)
226 (85.3 overs); Yaseen Vallie 105 (233); Shadley van Schalkwyk 4/44 (16 overs)		6/212 (59 overs); Rudi Second 65 (118); Sisanda Magala 2/40 (10 overs)

Knights won by 4 wickets
Buffalo Park, East London
Umpires: Allahudien Paleker and Brad White
Player of the match: Malusi Siboto

- Warriors won the toss and elected to bat.

=== Round 6 ===
3–6 March
Scorecard

(home team) Lions	v	Cape Cobras
580/7dec (138 overs); Dominic Hendricks 160 (340); Omphile Ramela 2/12 (1 overs)		258 (87 overs); Andrew Puttick 73 (169); Bjorn Fortuin 3/87 (28 overs)
		244 (f/o) (75.1 overs); Omphile Ramela 47 (147); Hardus Viljoen 4/42 (19.1 overs)

Lions won by an innings and 78 runs
Senwes Park, Potchefstroom
Umpires: Ryan Hendricks and Gerrie Pienaar

- Lions won the toss and elected to bat.

3–6 March
Scorecard

(home team) Titans	v	Knights
277 (99.5 overs); Dean Elgar 79 (181); Duanne Olivier 5/53 (25 overs)		122 (40.5 overs); Michael Erlank 27 (59); Marchant de Lange 4/34 (15.5 overs)
368/2dec (85 overs); Heino Kuhn 151* (244); Duanne Olivier 1/40 (11 overs)		164 (49.1 overs); Michael Erlank 52 (122); Marchant de Lange 7/76 (16.1 overs)

Titans won by 359 runs
Centurion Park, Centurion
Umpires: Murray Brown and Abdullah Steenkamp
Player of the match: Marchant de Lange and Heino Kuhn (Titans)

- Titans won the toss and elected to bat.

3–6 March
Scorecard

Dolphins	v	Warriors (home team)
450/8dec (134.2 overs); Morne van Wyk 122 (147); Simon Harmer 3/70 (19 overs)		209 (45.2 overs); Yaseen Vallie 86* (111); Daryn Dupavillon 5/49 (12 overs)
		187 (f/o) (62 overs); Jerry Nqolo 64 (144); Andile Phehlukwayo 4/39 (11 overs)

Dolphins won by an innings and 54 runs
Buffalo Park, East London
Umpires: Clifford Isaacs and Jeff Wolhuter
Player of the match: Daryn Dupavillon (Dolphins)

- Dolphins won the toss and elected to bat.

=== Round 7 ===
10–13 March
Scorecard

Titans	v	Dolphins (home team)
451/8d (106 overs); Qaasim Adams 123* (158); Daryn Dupavillon 3/87 (22 overs)		306/4d (91.2 overs); Sarel Erwee 108 (232); Marchant de Lange 3/92 (29 overs)
208/4d (53.4 overs); Heino Kuhn 80 (126); Keshav Maharaj 2/64 (19.4 overs)		336/6 (67 overs); Vaughn van Jaarsveld 122 (156); Marchant de Lange 4/90 (15 overs)

Match drawn
Kingsmead, Durban
Umpires: Clifford Isaacs and Gerrie Pienaar
Player of the match: Vaughn van Jaarsveld (Dolphins)

- Dolphins won the toss and elected to field.

10–13 March
Scorecard

Warriors	v	Cape Cobras (home team)
217 (65.5 overs); Yaseen Vallie 104 (127); Dane Paterson 4/41 (16.5 overs)		404 (136.5 overs); Wayne Parnell 111* (146); Simon Harmer 4/68 (38.5 overs)
175 (57.4 overs); JJ Smuts 61 (113); Dane Piedt 2/23 (8.4 overs)

Cape Cobras won by an innings and 12 runs
Boland Park, Paarl
Umpires: Allahudien Paleker and Dennis Smith
Player of the match: Wayne Parnell (Cape Cobras)

- Warriors won the toss and elected to bat.

10–13 March
Scorecard

(home team) Lions	v	Knights
144 (53.4 overs); Stephen Cook 43 (95); Duanne Olivier 3/34 (14 overs)		248 (89.1 overs); Rudi Second 70 (157); Hardus Viljoen 3/74 (23 overs)
218 (68.4 overs); Stephen Cook 42 (90); Duanne Olivier 4/63 (19.4 overs)		117/0 (34.2 overs); Reeza Hendricks 58* (112)

Knights won by 10 wickets
New Wanderers Stadium, Johannesburg
Umpires: Lubabalo Gcuma and Brad White
Player of the match: Rudi Second (Knights)

- Knights won the toss and elected to field.
- No play was possible on Day 1.

=== Round 8 ===
18–21 March
Scorecard

Lions	v	Dolphins (home team)
516/5d (138.2 overs); Dominic Hendricks 167 (304); Keshav Maharaj 4/161 (51 overs)		259/9 (89 overs); Daryn Smit 88 (171); Bjorn Fortuin 4/67 (25 overs)

Match drawn
City Oval, Pietermaritzburg
Umpires: Lubabalo Gcuma and Clifford Isaacs
Player of the match: Dominic Hendricks (Lions) and Rassie van der Dussen (Lions)

- Lions won the toss and elected to bat.

18–21 March
Scorecard

Cape Cobras	v	Knights (home team)
337 (111.4 overs); Dane Vilas 157 (216); Werner Coetsee 4/62 (23.4 overs)		372 (99.2 overs); Werner Coetsee 149 (181); Dane Piedt 5/106 (37.2 overs)
291 (95.1 overs); Omphile Ramela 109 (201); Shadley van Schalkwyk 4/21 (14.1 overs)		259/7 (60.3 overs); Pite van Biljon 82* (140); Lizaad Williams 3/49 (11 overs)

Knights won by 3 wickets
Mangaung Oval, Bloemfontein
Umpires: Bongani Jele and Brad White
Player of the match: Werner Coetsee (Knights)

- Cape Cobras won the toss and elected to bat.

18–21 March
Scorecard

(home team) Warriors	v	Titans
282 (67.4 overs); Somila Seyibokwe 101 (157); Tabraiz Shamsi 7/93 (19.4 overs)		399 (115.1 overs); Qaasim Adams 167 (261); JJ Smuts 3/38 (16.1 overs)
256 (74.4 overs); Colin Ackermann 72 (174); Tabraiz Shamsi 5/80 (29.4 overs)		145/2 (29.1 overs); Heino Kuhn 67 (89); Basheeru-Deen Walters 1/34 (10.1 overs)

Titans won by 8 wickets
St George's Park, Port Elizabeth
Umpires: Allahudien Paleker and Dennis Smith
Player of the match: Tabraiz Shamsi (Titans)

- Warriors won the toss and elected to bat.

=== Round 9 ===
31 March – 3 April
Scorecard

(home team) Knights	v	Warriors
128 (51 overs); Rudi Second 41* (114); Jerry Nqolo 4/11 (8 overs)		165 (74.1 overs); Sisanda Magala 36 (82); Malusi Siboto 4/19 (19 overs)
131 (34.4 overs); Shadley van Schalkwyk 30 (73); Anrich Nortje 5/34 (10 overs)		95/1 (17.2 overs); Martin Walters 40 (39); Werner Coetsee 1/17 (4 overs)

Warriors won by 9 wickets
Diamond Oval, Kimberley
Umpires: Chris Brown (NZ) and Brad White
Player of the match: Anrich Nortje (Warriors)

- Warriors won the toss and elected to field.

31 March – 3 April
Scorecard

Dolphins	v	Cape Cobras (home team)
183 (46.3 overs); Vaughn van Jaarsveld 58 (85); Wayne Parnell 7/51 (15 overs)		252 (88.5 overs); Dane Vilas 80 (98); Craig Alexander 5/62 (21 overs)
139 (45.4 overs); Senuran Muthusamy 34 (140); Wayne Parnell 5/54 (14 overs)		74/1 (16.5 overs); Stiaan van Zyl 37* (48); Craig Alexander 1/13 (4 overs)

Cape Cobras won by 9 wickets
Newlands Stadium, Cape Town
Umpires: Anil Dandekar (Ind) and Bongani Jele
Player of the match: Wayne Parnell (Cape Cobras)

- Cape Cobras won the toss and elected to field.

31 March – 3 April
Scorecard

Lions	v	Titans (home team)
609 (132.2 overs); Dwaine Pretorius 118 (171); Tabraiz Shamsi 5/183 (39.2 overs)		230 (83 overs); Henry Davids 90 (176); Dwaine Pretorius 4/24 (21 overs)
		385/6 f/o (146.5 overs); Dean Elgar 173 (386); Pumelela Matshikwe 6/58 (31 overs)

Match drawn
Centurion Park, Centurion
Umpires: Lubabalo Gcuma and Sam Nogajski (Aus)
Player of the match: Dean Elgar (Titans)

- Lions won the toss and elected to bat.

=== Round 10 ===
7–10 April
Scorecard

(home team) Dolphins	v	Knights
375 (126 overs); Vaughn van Jaarsveld 106 (158); Dillon du Preez 5/44 (25 overs)		218 (78.1 overs); Michael Erlank 66 (174); Craig Alexander 6/60 (15.1 overs)
224/3d (55 overs); Imraan Khan 106* (155); Shadley van Schalkwyk 1/27 (7 overs)		263 (88 overs); Rilee Rossouw 84 (133); Rabian Engelbrecht 4/43 (14 overs)

Dolphins won by 118 runs
Kingsmead, Durban
Umpires: Anil Dandekar (Ind) and Shaun George
Player of the match: Vaughn van Jaarsveld (Dolphins)

- Knights won the toss and elected to field.

7–10 April
Scorecard

Titans	v	Cape Cobras (home team)
164 (43 overs); Henry Davids 74 (96); Wayne Parnell 5/62 (13 overs)		285 (81.4 overs); Omphile Ramela 84 (148); Ethy Mbhalati 4/85 (19.4 overs)
256 (56.4 overs); Heino Kuhn 127 (148); Dane Piedt 7/106 (23.4 overs)		125 (37.4 overs); Dane Vilas 25 (34); Rowan Richards 7/40 (16 overs)

Titans won by 10 runs
Boland Park, Paarl
Umpires: Johan Cloete and Sam Nogajski (Aus)
Player of the match: Heino Kuhn (Titans) and Rowan Richards (Titans)

- Cape Cobras won the toss and elected to field.

7–10 April
Scorecard

Lions	v	Warriors (home team)
68 (36 overs); Kagiso Rapulana 20 (63); Sisanda Magala 6/25 (12 overs)		375 (109.4 overs); Colin Ackermann 65 (124); Hardus Viljoen 5/139 (36 overs)
206 (83.5 overs); Nicky van den Bergh 52 (127); Andrew Birch 3/42 (21 overs)

Warriors won by an innings and 101 runs
St George's Park, Port Elizabeth
Umpires: Chris Brown (NZ) and Adrian Holdstock
Player of the match: Sisanda Magala (Warriors)

- Warriors won the toss and elected to field.

== Statistics ==
=== Most runs ===
Runs	Ma	In	Player	100/50	Ave
1,126	10	20	(South Africa) Heino Kuhn (Titans)	4/4	62.55
761	8	13	(South Africa) Dane Vilas (Cape Cobras)	2/3	69.18
738	8	13	(South Africa) Stephen Cook (Lions)	3/2	61.50
730	9	16	(South Africa) Qaasim Adams (Lions / Titans)	2/4	56.15
640	9	13	(South Africa) Vaughn van Jaarsveld (Dolphins)	2/3	49.23
609	9	13	(South Africa) Imraan Khan (Dolphins)	3/3	50.75
608	6	12	(South Africa) Dean Elgar (Titans)	2/2	50.66
602	9	17	(South Africa) Theunis de Bruyn (Titans)	2/1	37.62
592	8	14	(South Africa) Omphile Ramela (Cape Cobras)	2/2	42.28
592	10	16	(South Africa) Dominic Hendricks (Lions)	2/1	37.00
Source: ESPNcricinfo, 23 February 2016

=== Most wickets ===
Wickets	Ma	In	Player	Overs	Ave
47	9	15	(South Africa) Hardus Viljoen (Lions)	334.5	23.02
41	7	14	(South Africa) Duanne Olivier (Knights)	224.0	16.07
41	7	12	(South Africa) Tabraiz Shamsi (Titans)	248.5	19.97
39	7	12	(South Africa) Dane Piedt (Cape Cobras)	261.0	22.33
38	7	12	(South Africa) Marchant de Lange (Titans)	214.5	22.23
36	10	17	(South Africa) Dwaine Pretorius (Lions)	287.0	21.36
36	9	15	(South Africa) Keshav Maharaj (Dolphins)	409.0	32.00
31	9	14	(South Africa) Simon Harmer (Warriors)	282.0	22.41
30	10	18	(South Africa) Ethy Mbhalati (Titans)	226.1	27.16
28	6	11	(South Africa) Craig Alexander (Dolphins)	159.3	20.03
Source: ESPNcricinfo, 23 February 2016
