= 2015 Ram Slam T20 Challenge =

Cricket tournament

- Dates: 1 November 2015 – 12 December 2015
- Administrator: Cricket South Africa
- Cricket format: Twenty20
- Tournament format(s): Double round-robin and knockout
- Host: South Africa
- Champions: Titans (4th title)
- Participants: 6
- Most runs: Quinton de Kock (437)
- Most wickets: Chris Morris (18)

The 2015–16 Ram Slam T20 Challenge was the thirteenth season of the Ram Slam T20 Challenge, established by Cricket South Africa. The tournament was previously known as the MiWay T20 Challenge and the Standard Bank Pro20 Series. The tournament was played between 1 November and 12 December 2015. Titans won the tournament beating Dolphins by 3 wickets in the final.

== Squads ==
Cape Cobras	Dolphins	Knights	Lions	Titans	Warriors
Hashim Amla; Jean-Paul Duminy; Sybrand Engelbrecht; Clyde Fortuin; Beuran Hendricks; Justin Kemp; Shaheen Khan; Rory Kleinveldt; Richard Levi; Aviwe Mgijima; Justin Ontong; Dane Paterson; Keegan Petersen; Robin Peterson; Vernon Philander; Dane Piedt; Andrew Puttick; Omphile Ramela; Mthokozisi Shezi; Dale Steyn; Stiaan van Zyl; Dane Vilas; Kieron Pollard; Lizaad Williams	Morne van Wyk; Craig Alexander; Cody Chetty; Cameron Delport; Robbie Frylinck; Imran Tahir; Imraan Khan; Ryan McLaren; Keshav Maharaj; David Miller; Kevin Pietersen; Calvin Savage; Daryn Smit; Thandi Tshabalala; Vaughn van Jaarsveld; Divan van Wyk; Dwayne Bravo; Khaya Zondo	Gerhardt Abrahams; Tumelo Bodibe; Werner Coetsee; Corné Dry; Dillon du Preez; Michael Erlank; Quinton Friend; Reeza Hendricks; Tumi Masekela; Duanne Olivier; Obus Pienaar; Diego Rosier; Rilee Rossouw; Rudi Second; Letlotlo Sesele; Malusi Siboto; Pite van Biljon; Shadley van Schalkwyk; Andre Russell	Thami Tsolekile; Temba Bavuma; Devon Conway; Stephen Cook; Bjorn Fortuin; Dominic Hendricks; Sean Jamison; Eddie Leie; Neil McKenzie; Pumelela Matshikwe; Alviro Petersen; Aaron Phangiso; Shaylen Pillay; Nono Pongolo; Dwaine Pretorius; Kagiso Rabada; Jean Symes; Lonwabo Tsotsobe; Rassie van der Dussen; Hardus Viljoen	Qaasim Adams; Farhaan Behardien; Junior Dala; Henry Davids; Theunis de Bruyn; Quinton de Kock; Marchant de Lange; AB de Villiers; Faf du Plessis; Dean Elgar; Heino Kuhn; Ethy Mbhalati; Sammy Mofokeng; Albie Morkel; Morne Morkel; Chris Morris; Mangaliso Mosehle; Rowan Richards; Tabraiz Shamsi; Graeme van Buuren; Shaun von Berg; David Wiese	Colin Ackermann; Andrew Birch; Gihahn Cloete; Clyde Fortuin; Ayabulela Gqamane; Simon Harmer; Colin Ingram; Christiaan Jonker; Sisanda Magala; Lundi Mbane; Thandolwethu Mnyaka; Michael Price; Somila Seyibokwe; JJ Smuts; Rusty Theron; Yaseen Valli; Basheeru-Deen Walters; David White

== Fixtures ==
=== Group stage ===
1 November
12:00
Scorecard

Warriors; 81/2 (6 overs)	v	Knights; 81/5 (6 overs)
Colin Ingram 52* (21); Dillon du Preez 2/17 (2 overs)		Ryan McLaren 34 (14); Andrew Birch 2/9 (1 overs)

Match tied (Warriors won the one-over eliminator)
Newlands, Cape Town
Umpires: Johan Cloete and Shaun George

- Knights won the toss and elected to field.

1 November
15:30
Scorecard

Dolphins; 179/4 (20 overs)	v	Titans; 173/8 (20 overs)
David Miller 62 (32); Albie Morkel 2/28 (4 overs)		Albie Morkel 67 (34); Prenelan Subrayen 4/22 (4 overs)

Dolphins won by 6 runs
Centurion Park, Centurion
Umpires: Murray Brown and Dennis Smith

- Titans won the toss and elected to field.

1 November
17:00 (D/N)
Scorecard

Cape Cobras; 125/8 (18 overs)	v	Lions; 125/3 (16.4 overs)
Andrew Puttick 30 (21); Aaron Phangiso 2/8 (3 overs)		Rassie van der Dussen 55 (48); Kieron Pollard 2/27 (4 overs)

Lions won by 7 wickets (D/L method)
Newlands, Cape Town
Umpires: Marais Erasmus and Bongani Jele

- Lions won the toss and elected to field.

4 November
18:00 (D/N)
Scorecard

Dolphins; 174/6 (20 overs)	v	Lions; 173/2 (20 overs)
Kevin Pietersen 115* (66); Aaron Phangiso 2/17 (4 overs)		Devon Conway 63 (46); Cameron Delport 1/26 (3 overs)

Dolphins won by 1 run
Kingsmead, Durban
Umpires: Adrian Holdstock and Allahudien Paleker

- Lions won the toss and elected to field.

6 November
18:00 (D/N)
Scorecard

Cape Cobras; 140/6 (20 overs)	v	Warriors; 135/7 (20 overs)
Richard Levi 52 (37); JJ Smuts 2/14 (4 overs)		Colin Ackermann 64 (59); Dane Paterson 3/31 (4 overs)

Cobras won by 5 runs
Boland Bank Park, Paarl
Umpires: Lubabalo Gcuma and Dennis Smith

- Warriors won the toss and elected to field.

6 November
18:00 (D/N)
Scorecard

Knights; 167/4 (20 overs)	v	Dolphins; 170/1 (16.4 overs)
Theunis de Bruyn 100 (55); Kyle Abbott 2/31 (4 overs)		Kevin Pietersen 100* (45); Ryan McLaren 1/26 (3 overs)

Dolphins won by 9 wickets
Diamond Oval, Kimberley
Umpires: Shaun George and Bongani Jele

- Dolphins won the toss and elected to field.

6 November
18:00 (D/N)
Scorecard

Lions; 115 (19.3 overs)	v	Titans; 117/6 (17.5 overs)
Thami Tsolekile 58 (41); Chris Morris 2/27 (4 overs)		Quinton de Kock 36 (31); Aaron Phangiso 3/19 (4 overs)

Titans won by 4 wickets
Senwes Park, Potchefstroom
Umpires: Allahudien Paleker and Brad White

- Titans won the toss and elected to field.

8 November
14:30
Scorecard

Dolphins; 179/4 (20 overs)	v	Warriors; 145 (19.4 overs)
Kevin Pietersen 68 (44); Sisanda Magala 2/29 (4 overs)		JJ Smuts 30 (19); Prenelan Subrayen 4/29 (4 overs)

Dolphins won by 34 runs
Kingsmead, Durban
Umpires: Lubabalo Gcuma and Shaun George

- Warriors won the toss and elected to field.

8 November
14:30
Scorecard

Titans; 173/5 (20 overs)	v	Cape Cobras; 147/6 (20 overs)
Farhaan Behardien 61* (31); Dane Paterson 3/31 (4 overs)		Omphile Ramela 38 (28); Albie Morkel 2/28 (4 overs)

Titans won by 26 runs
Centurion Park, Centurion
Umpires: Clifford Isaacs and Gerrie Pienaar

- Cape Cobras won the toss and elected to field.

11 November
18:00 (D/N)
Scorecard

Knights; 174/5 (20 overs)	v	Cape Cobras; 176/6 (19 overs)
Reeza Hendricks 98* (66); George Linde 4/21 (4 overs)		Andrew Puttick 37 (36); Werner Coetsee 2/19 (4 overs)

Cape Cobras won by 4 wickets
Diamond Oval, Kimberley
Umpires: Bongani Jele and Brad White

- Cape Cobras won the toss and elected to field.

13 November
18:00 (D/N)
Scorecard

Titans; 128/5 (20 overs)	v	Knights; 127/7 (20 overs)
Albie Morkel 46* (34); Malusi Siboto 2/14 (4 overs)		Reeza Hendricks 63 (52); David Wiese 4/26 (4 overs)

Titans won by 1 run
Mangaung Oval, Bloemfontein
Umpires: Clifford Isaacs and Bongani Jele

- Knights won the toss and elected to field.

13 November
18:00 (D/N)
Scorecard

Warriors; 155/4 (20 overs)	v	Lions; 130/9 (20 overs)
Colin Ackermann 79* (59); Aaron Phangiso 2/36 (4 overs)		Rassie van der Dussen 56 (44); Sisanda Magala 5/28 (4 overs)

Warriors won by 25 runs
St George's Park, Port Elizabeth
Umpires: Murray Brown and Adrian Holdstock

- Lions won the toss and elected to field.

15 November
12:00
Scorecard

Dolphins; 148/9 (20 overs)	v	Cape Cobras; 152/5 (19.4 overs)
Kevin Pietersen 59 (35); Wayne Parnell 4/20 (4 overs)		Richard Levi 61 (28); Khaya Zondo 2/22 (4 overs)

Cape Cobras won by 5 wickets
Centurion Park, Centurion
Umpires: Shaun George and Stephen Harris

- Cape Cobras won the toss and elected to field.

15 November
14:30
Scorecard

Lions; 112/7 (20 overs)	v	Knights; 92 (19 overs)
Dwaine Pretorius 35 (28); Shadley van Schalkwyk 4/19 (4 overs)		Reeza Hendricks 32 (35); Eddie Leie 5/15 (4 overs)

Lions won by 20 runs
Mangaung Oval, Bloemfontein
Umpires: Clifford Isaacs and Brad White

- Lions won the toss and elected to bat.

15 November
16:00 (D/N)
Scorecard

Warriors; 149/7 (20 overs)	v	Titans; 150/5 (17.1 overs)
Colin Ackermann 40 (49); David Wiese 3/23 (3 overs)		Quinton de Kock 60 (34); Colin Ackermann 2/25 (4 overs)

Titans won by 5 wickets
Centurion Park, Centurion
Umpires: Adrian Holdstock and Dennis Smith

- Titans won the toss and elected to field.

18 November
18:00 (D/N)
Scorecard

Titans; 136/9 (20 overs)	v	Dolphins; 70 (15.4 overs)
Quinton de Kock 38 (31); Andile Phehlukwayo 3/27 (4 overs)		Dwayne Bravo 27 (31); Chris Morris 4/9 (3 overs)

Titans won by 66 runs
Kingsmead, Durban
Umpires: Shaun George and Brad White

- Dolphins won the toss and elected to field.

20 November
18:00 (D/N)
Scorecard

Titans; 177/3 (20 overs)	v	Cape Cobras; 168/6 (20 overs)
Quinton de Kock 85 (51); Dane Paterson 1/32 (4 overs); Kieron Pollard 1/32 (4 overs)		Kieron Pollard 44 (23); Chris Morris 2/40 (4 overs)

Titans won by 9 runs
Newlands, Cape Town
Umpires: Shaun George and Adrian Holdstock

- Cape Cobras won the toss and elected to field.

20 November
18:00 (D/N)
Scorecard

Dolphins; 35/0 (5.1 overs)	v	Warriors
Vaughn van Jaarsveld 16* (11)

No result
Buffalo Park, East London
Umpires: Bongani Jele and Gerrie Pienaar

- Dolphins won the toss and elected to bat.
- Rain stopped play with 5.1 overs of the Dolphins innings completed.

22 November
12:00
Scorecard

Knights; 140/7 (20 overs)	v	Cape Cobras; 144/6 (19.3 overs)
Theunis de Bruyn 45 (44); Dane Paterson 2/24 (4 overs)		Justin Ontong 40 (42); Dillon du Preez 2/28 (4 overs)

Cape Cobras won by 4 wickets
Boland Park, Paarl
Umpires: Shaun George and Adrian Holdstock

- Cape Cobras won the toss and elected to field.

22 November
16:00 (D/N)
Scorecard

Lions; 145/6 (20 overs)	v	Dolphins; 139/7 (20 overs)
Alviro Petersen 60 (41); Ryan McLaren 2/33 (4 overs)		Vaughn van Jaarsveld 42 (28); Dwaine Pretorius 4/22 (4 overs)

Lions won by 6 runs
New Wanderers Stadium, Johannesburg
Umpires: Dennis Smith and Brad White

- Dolphins won the toss and elected to field.

25 November
18:00 (D/N)
Scorecard

Knights; 175/5 (20 overs)	v	Lions; 146/9 (20 overs)
Reeza Hendricks 72* (56); Aaron Phangiso 2/26 (4 overs)		Rassie van der Dussen 40 (26); Malusi Siboto 3/29 (4 overs)

Knights won by 29 runs
Senwes Park, Potchefstroom
Umpires: Stephen Harris and Allahudien Paleker

- Lions won the toss and elected to field.

28 November
14:00
Scorecard

Dolphins; 82/9 (20 overs)	v	Knights; 85/2 (13 overs)
Dwayne Bravo 23 (24); Malusi Siboto 3/14 (4 overs)		Theunis de Bruyn 42* (38); Rabian Engelbrecht 1/14 (2 overs)

Knights won by 8 wickets
St George's Park, Port Elizabeth
Umpires: Shaun George and Adrian Holdstock

- Dolphins won the toss and elected to bat.

28 November
18:00 (D/N)
Scorecard

Titans; 167/3 (20 overs)	v	Warriors; 127 (18.4 overs)
Mangaliso Mosehle 65* (36); Colin Ingram 1/4 (1 over)		Colin Ingram 25 (22); Christiaan Jonker 25 (22); Chris Morris 3/15 (4 overs)

Titans won by 40 runs
St George's Park, Port Elizabeth
Umpires: Lubabalo Gcuma and Dennis Smith

- Titans won the toss and elected to bat.

29 November
14:30
Scorecard

Lions; 153/5 (20 overs)	v	Cape Cobras; 154/4 (19.1 overs)
Devon Conway 37 (36); Justin Kemp 2/26 (4 overs)		Wayne Parnell 99 (57); Bjorn Fortuin 1/20 (4 overs)

Cape Cobras won by 6 wickets
New Wanderers Stadium, Johannesburg
Umpires: Johan Cloete and Brad White

- Lions won the toss and elected to bat.

2 December
18:00 (D/N)
Scorecard

Warriors; 153/8 (20 overs)	v	Cape Cobras; 141/7 (20 overs)
JJ Smuts 61* (40); Mthokozisi Shezi 5/34 (4 overs)		Wayne Parnell 74* (60); Andrew Birch 3/28 (4 overs)

Warriors won by 12 runs
Buffalo Park, East London
Umpires: Stephen Harris and Dennis Smith

- Warriors won the toss and elected to bat.

4 December
18:00 (D/N)
Scorecard

Cape Cobras; 142 (20 overs)	v	Dolphins; 146/2 (18.4 overs)
Robin Peterson 35* (22); Keshav Maharaj 2/21 (4 overs)		Morne van Wyk 60* (52); Robin Peterson 1/30 (4 overs)

Dolphins won by 8 wickets
Kingsmead, Durban
Umpires: Shaun George and Adrian Holdstock

- Cape Cobras won the toss and elected to bat.

4 December
18:00 (D/N)
Scorecard

Knights; 170/5 (20 overs)	v	Warriors; 171/4 (20 overs)
Andre Russell 52 (24); Sisanda Magala 2/28 (4 overs)		Somila Seyibokwe 73 (57); Andre Russell 3/31 (4 overs)

Warriors won by 6 wickets
Mangaung Oval, Bloemfontein
Umpires: Clifford Isaacs and Allahudien Paleker

- Warriors won the toss and elected to field.

4 December
18:00 (D/N)
Scorecard

Titans; 158/2 (15 overs)	v	Lions; 93/8 (15 overs)
Quinton de Kock 88 (43); Lonwabo Tsotsobe 1/32 (3 overs)		Dominic Hendricks 43* (37); Albie Morkel 3/13 (3 overs)

Titans won by 68 runs (D/L method)
Willowmoore Park, Benoni
Umpires: Johan Cloete and Dennis Smith

- Lions won the toss and elected to field.

6 December
12:00
Scorecard

Titans; 136/9 (20 overs)	v	Knights; 139/9 (15.5 overs)
Graeme van Buuren 57 (41); Andre Russell 4/11 (4 overs)		Andre Russell 66* (23); Chris Morris 2/12 (3 overs)

Knights won by 4 wickets
Willowmoore Park, Benoni
Umpires: Johan Cloete and Shaun George

- Knights won the toss and elected to field.

6 December
12:00
Scorecard

Lions; 127/9 (20 overs)	v	Warriors; 106 (17.5 overs)
Dominic Hendricks 35 (38); Basheeru-Deen Walters 3/21 (4 overs)		Christiaan Jonker 45 (30); Eddie Leie 4/32 (3.5 overs)

Lions won by 21 runs
New Wanderers Stadium, Johannesburg
Umpires: Lubabalo Gcuma and Brad White

- Warriors won the toss and elected to field.

=== Knockout stage ===
Semi-final

9 December
16:00 (D/N)
Scorecard

Dolphins; 178/3 (20 overs)	v	Cape Cobras; 173/8 (20 overs)
Morne van Wyk 57 (49); Dane Paterson 2/24 (4 overs)		Richard Levi 85 (43); Andile Phehlukwayo 2/28 (4 overs)

Dolphins won by 5 runs
Kingsmead, Durban
Umpires: Shaun George and Dennis Smith

- Dolphins won the toss and elected to bat.
- Dolphins qualify for the final.

Final

12 December
16:00 (D/N)
Scorecard

Dolphins; 159/5 (20 overs)	v	Titans; 161/3 (16.5 overs)
Dwayne Bravo 53 (30); David Wiese 2/28 (3 overs)		Mangaliso Mosehle 87 (39); Kyle Abbott 2/39 (3.5 overs)

Titans won by 7 wickets
Centurion Park, Centurion
Umpires: Adrian Holdstock and Bongani Jele

- Titans won the toss and elected to field.
- Titans qualified directly for the final by topping the group stage.
