= 2014–15 Sunfoil Series =

Cricket competition in South Africa

- Dates: 25 September 2014 – 29 March 2015
- Administrator: Cricket South Africa
- Cricket format: First-class
- Tournament format: Double round-robin
- Champions: Lions (1st title)
- Participants: 6
- Matches: 30
- Most runs: Stephen Cook (889)
- Most wickets: Dane Paterson (42)

The 2014–15 Sunfoil Series was a first-class cricket competition held in South Africa from 25 September 2014 to 29 March 2015. Lions won the tournament for the first time after completing a 188 run victory in the final over against Dolphins cricket team in the penultimate round of the competition.

== Squads ==
As of 11 September 2014

Cape Cobras	Dolphins	Knights	Lions	Titans	Warriors
Justin Ontong (C); Hashim Amla; Jean-Paul Duminy; Sybrand Engelbrecht; Clyde Fortuin; Beuran Hendricks; Justin Kemp; Shaheen Khan; Rory Kleinveldt; Richard Levi; Aviwe Mgijima; Wayne Parnell; Dane Paterson; Keegan Petersen; Robin Peterson; Vernon Philander; Dane Piedt; (Cricket West Indies) Kieron Pollard; Andrew Puttick; Omphile Ramela; Mthokozisi Shezi; Dale Steyn; Yaseen Vallie; Stiaan van Zyl; Dane Vilas; Lizaad Williams	Morne van Wyk (C); Kyle Abbott; Craig Alexander; (Cricket West Indies) Dwayne Bravo; Cody Chetty; Cameron Delport; Daryn Dupavillon; Robbie Frylinck; Imran Tahir; Imraan Khan; Ryan McLaren; Keshav Maharaj; David Miller; Calvin Savage; Daryn Smit; Prenelan Subrayen; Thandi Tshabalala; Jonathan Vandiar; Vaughn van Jaarsveld; Divan van Wyk; Khaya Zondo	Werner Coetsee (C); Gerhardt Abrahams; Tumelo Bodibe; Gihahn Cloete; Johannes Diseko; Corné Dry; Dillon du Preez; Quinton Friend; Reeza Hendricks; Duanne Olivier; Obus Pienaar; Diego Rosier; Rilee Rossouw; (Cricket West Indies) Andre Russell; Rudi Second; Malusi Siboto; Pite van Biljon; Shadley van Schalkwyk	Stephen Cook (C); Temba Bavuma; Gulam Bodi; Devon Conway; Quinton de Kock; (Cricket West Indies) Chris Gayle; Dominic Hendricks; Eddie Leie; Neil McKenzie; Pumelela Matshikwe; Chris Morris; Brett Pelser; Alviro Petersen; Aaron Phangiso; Shaylen Pillay; Dwaine Pretorius; Kagiso Rabada; Jean Symes; Thami Tsolekile; Lonwabo Tsotsobe; Rassie van der Dussen; Hardus Viljoen	Farhaan Behardien (C); Qaasim Adams; Junior Dala; Henry Davids; Marchant de Lange; AB de Villiers; Juan de Villiers; Faf du Plessis; Dean Elgar; Heino Kuhn; Eden Links; Ethy Mbhalati; Albie Morkel; Morne Morkel; Mangaliso Mosehle; Cobus Pienaar; Rowan Richards; (Cricket West Indies) Daren Sammy; Tabraiz Shamsi; Graeme van Buuren; Roelof van der Merwe; Shaun von Berg; David Wiese	Colin Ingram (C); Colin Ackermann; Ryan Bailey; Andrew Birch; Athenkosi Dyili; Ayabulela Gqamane; Simon Harmer; Davy Jacobs; Christiaan Jonker; (England) Craig Kieswetter; Sisanda Magala; Vuyisa Makhaphela; Lundi Mbane; Thandolwethu Mnyaka; Solo Nqweni; Wayne Parnell; Michael Price; JJ Smuts; Rusty Theron; Basheeru-Deen Walters; David White

== Points table ==
Teams	Pld	W	L	D	A	Pts
Lions	10	7	1	2	0	151.64
Titans	10	4	4	2	0	111.76
Dolphins	10	4	4	2	0	107.76
Cape Cobras	10	2	4	4	0	87.88
Knights	10	3	4	3	0	85.80
Warriors	10	2	5	3	0	71.48

== Statistics ==
=== Most runs ===
Runs	Ma	In	Player	100/50	Ave
889	10	17	(South Africa) Stephen Cook (Lions)	5/1	63.50
852	10	19	(South Africa) Colin Ingram (Warriors)	3/4	53.25
502	10	16	(South Africa) Roelof van der Merwe (Titans)	3/3	55.28
749	8	15	(South Africa) Pite van Biljon (Knights)	3/2	53.50
724	10	16	(South Africa) Omphile Ramela (Cape Cobras)	2/1	48.26
714	8	13	(South Africa) Morne van Wyk (Dolphins)	2/5	68.71
690	8	11	(South Africa) Neil McKenzie (Lions)	3/1	69.00
651	10	18	(South Africa) Divan van Wyk (Dolphins)	1/5	36.16
648	10	18	(South Africa) Imraan Khan (Dolphins)	2/3	38.11
309	9	17	(South Africa) Rudi Second (Knights)	1/5	37.64
Source: ESPNcricinfo, 29 March 2015

=== Most wickets ===
Wickets	Ma	In	Player	Overs	Ave
42	9	16	(South Africa) Dane Paterson (Cape Cobras)	303.1	22.54
39	7	14	(South Africa) Hardus Viljoen (Lions)	239.3	20.43
39	8	16	(South Africa) Kagiso Rabada (Lions)	276.0	21.12
37	10	17	(South Africa) Andrew Birch (Warriors)	316.0	24.70
36	10	17	(South Africa) Rowan Richards (Titans)	300.1	27.86
36	8	14	(South Africa) Keshav Maharaj (Dolphins)	344.4	29.38
32	7	14	(South Africa) Chris Morris (Lions)	210.0	20.18
29	6	12	(South Africa) Mathew Pillans (Dolphins)	203.1	23.79
29	7	13	(South Africa) Ethy Mbhalati (Titans)	236.2	24.13
29	10	18	(South Africa) Basheeru-Deen Walters (Warriors)	287.0	35.31
Source: ESPNcricinfo, 29 March 2015
