= List of Titans cricketers =

This is a list of cricketers who played for the South African franchise team Titans between the 2003–04 season and 2020–21. It includes the players who appeared for the team in first-class, List A and Twenty20 competitions during the period in which the team was a franchise.

During 2003, Cricket South Africa changed the way in which top-class domestic cricket in the country was organised. This created six franchise teams at the top level of domestic competition, combining the existing provincial teams to create an elite competition. Titans were formed by combining two of the existing teams in Gauteng province, Easterns and Northerns. (Note: The other team in Gauteng Province, the Gauteng cricket team, combined with North West from the neighbouring North West Province to form the Lions franchise.) Initially the team competed in the 2003–04 CSA T20 Challenge, before the CSA 4-Day Domestic Series and CSA One-Day Cup also became franchise-only competitions the following season.

During the period of franchise competitions, Easterns and Northerns continued to compete as separate cricket unions in the CSA 3-Day and One-Day Cups and CSA T20 competitions. The period of franchise competition lasted until the end of the 2020–21 season when Cricket South Africa reverted to a division based provincial competition, with both teams competing separately from the start of the 2021–22 season. Many of the senior provincial unions which had been involved in franchise competitions retained the names of their franchises as marketing tools. Northerns, the senior team in the Titans franchise, chose to do so and compete using the name Titans.

This list includes only the players who played for Titans franchise between 2003–04 and 2020–21, the period in which franchise cricket operated in South Africa. It does not include players who appeared only for Easterns or Northerns in provincial competitions during that period, or those who played for Northerns after the end of franchise competitions in 2020–21.

== A ==
- Kyle Abbott
- Siraag Abrahams
- Qaasim Adams
- Andrea Agathangelou
- Matthew Arnold
- Maurice Aronstam
- Clayton August

== B ==
- Farhaan Behardien
- Gulam Bodi
- Tumelo Bodibe
- Corbin Bosch
- Jaco Booysen
- Neil Brand

== C ==
- Ryan Cartwright
- Okuhle Cele
- Neetan Chouhan
- Ruben Claassen
- Daryll Cullinan

== D ==
- Junior Dala
- Henry Davids
- Pierre de Bruyn
- Theunis de Bruyn
- Zander de Bruyn
- Quinton de Kock
- Marchant de Lange
- AB de Villiers
- CJ de Villiers
- Juan de Villiers
- Tony de Zorzi
- Gerald Dros
- Faf du Plessis
- Leus du Plooy

== E ==
- Dean Elgar

== G ==
- Dayyaan Galiem
- Herschelle Gibbs
- Khwezi Gumede

== H ==
- Andrew Hall
- Simon Harmer
- Paul Harris
- Eldred Hawken
- Rubin Hermann

== I ==
- Imran Tahir

== J ==
- Rushdi Jappie
- Pierre Joubert

== K ==
- Ernest Kemm
- Justin Kemp
- Heinrich Klaasen
- Gionne Koopman
- Heino Kuhn

== L ==
- Francois le Clus
- Shaun Liebisch
- Eden Links

== M ==
- Bafana Mahlangu
- Gregory Mahlokwana
- Sibonelo Makhanya
- Wandile Makwetu
- Pieter Malan
- Imraan Manack
- Aiden Markram
- Imraan Manack
- Tumi Masekela
- Mandla Mashimbyi
- Sizwe Masondo
- Ethy Mbhalati
- Sammy Mofokeng
- Grant Mokoena
- Rivaldo Moonsamy
- Vincent Moore
- Tshepo Moreki
- Albie Morkel
- Morné Morkel
- Chris Morris
- Mangaliso Mosehle
- Itumaleng Moseki
- Alfred Mothoa
- Johann Myburgh

== N ==
- Lepono Ndhlovu
- André Nel
- Lungi Ngidi
- Sean Nowak
- Thando Ntini

== O ==
- Mario Olivier

== P ==
- Alviro Petersen
- Aaron Phangiso
- Dane Piedt
- Marcello Piedt
- Cobus Pienaar
- Migael Pretorius

== R ==
- Brendon Reddy
- Rowan Richards
- Diego Rosier
- Jacques Rudolph

== S ==
- Saeed Ajmal
- Daren Sammy
- Mpho Sekhoto
- Kabelo Sekhukhune
- Andre Seymore
- Tabraiz Shamsi
- Malusi Siboto
- Kyle Simmonds
- Daniel Sincuba
- Blake Snijman
- Dale Steyn
- Scott Styris

== T ==
- Alfonso Thomas
- Grant Thomson
- Geoffrey Toyana

== V ==
- Yaseen Valli
- Graeme van Buuren
- Roelof van der Merwe
- Jonathan Vandiar
- Martin van Jaarsveld
- Kruger van Wyk
- Kyllin Vardhan
- Hardus Viljoen
- Shaun von Berg

== W ==
- Neil Wagner
- Basheer Walters
- David Wiese
- Lizaad Williams
