= 2016 CSA T20 Challenge =

Cricket tournament

- Dates: 12 November 2016 – 16 December 2016
- Administrator: Cricket South Africa
- Cricket format: Twenty20
- Tournament format(s): Double round-robin and knockout
- Host: South Africa
- Champions: Titans (5th title)
- Participants: 6
- Matches: 32
- Most runs: JJ Smuts (371)
- Most wickets: Hardus Viljoen (19)

The 2016–17 CSA T20 Challenge was the fourteenth season of the CSA T20 Challenge, established by Cricket South Africa and was played between 12 November and 16 December 2016. The tournament schedule clashed with South Africa's Test series in Australia, meaning international players were unavailable for the first half of the competition. The tournament was previously known as the MiWay T20 Challenge and the Standard Bank Pro20 Series.

In September 2016, the courier company RAM decided not to renew its sponsorship of the tournament. However, the tournament went ahead as planned.

Titans finished top of the table in the round-robin section of the tournament and qualified directly for the final. Warriors and Lions finished second and third respectively and qualified for the playoff final. Warriors won the playoff by 7 wickets and progressed to the final. Titans won the final by 6 runs to win back-to-back titles.

== Fixtures ==
=== Round-robin ===
12 November 2016
Scorecard

Knights; 184/8 (20 overs)	v	Cape Cobras; 146 (17.2 overs)
Patrick Kruger 74 (49); Dane Paterson 3/40 (4 overs)		Keegan Petersen 39 (29); Marchant de Lange 3/17 (3.2 overs)

Knights won by 38 runs
New Wanderers Stadium, Johannesburg
Umpires: Bongani Jele and Allahudien Paleker

- Cape Cobras won the toss and elected to field.

12 November 2016 (D/N)
Scorecard

Titans; 194/4 (20 overs)	v	Lions; 152/8 (20 overs)
Heino Kuhn 83* (52); Hardus Viljoen 2/34 (4 overs)		Rassie van der Dussen 51 (28); Albie Morkel 3/12 (4 overs)

Titans won by 42 runs
New Wanderers Stadium, Johannesburg
Umpires: Shaun George and Adrian Holdstock

- Lions won the toss and elected to field.
- Willem Mulder (Lions) made his T20 debut.

13 November 2016
Scorecard

Dolphins; 115/9 (20 overs)	v	Warriors; 118/3 (15.5 overs)
Cody Chetty 24 (27); Andrew Birch 3/16 (4 overs)		JJ Smuts 54 (39); Andile Phehlukwayo 2/3 (2 overs)

Warriors won by 7 wickets
Kingsmead, Durban
Umpires: Shaun George and Bongani Jele

- Warriors won the toss and elected to field.

16 November 2016 (D/N)
Scorecard

Cape Cobras; 141/6 (20 overs)	v	Titans; 142/4 (18.5 overs)
Cebo Tshiki 47 (43); Junior Dala 2/17 (4 overs)		Heinrich Klaasen 46 (39); Jason Smith 1/23 (3 overs)

Titans won by 6 wickets
Boland Park, Paarl
Umpires: Johan Cloete and Allahudien Paleker

- Cape Cobras won the toss and elected to bat.

16 November 2016 (D/N)
Scorecard

Dolphins; 193/4 (20 overs)	v	Lions; 144 (19.3 overs)
Cameron Delport 93 (62); Hardus Viljoen 2/34 (4 overs)		Dominic Hendricks 46 (34); Cameron Delport 4/17 (3.3 overs)

Dolphins won by 49 runs
Kingsmead, Durban
Umpires: Shaun George and Stephen Harris

- Lions won the toss and elected to field.

18 November 2016 (D/N)
Scorecard

Cape Cobras; 163/8 (20 overs)	v	Warriors; 151/8 (20 overs)
Wayne Parnell 61 (51); Andrew Birch 3/28 (4 overs)		Colin Ackermann 60 (41); George Linde 3/23 (4 overs)

Cape Cobras won by 12 runs
Newlands, Cape Town
Umpires: Murray Brown and Allahudien Paleker

- Warriors won the toss and elected to field.

18 November 2016 (D/N)
Scorecard

Knights; 185/6 (20 overs)	v	Titans; 186/7 (19.5 overs)
David Miller 120* (61); Albie Morkel 2/21 (4 overs)		Heinrich Klaasen 52 (30); Marchant de Lange 2/34 (4 overs)

Titans won by 3 wickets
Willowmoore Park, Benoni
Umpires: Shaun George and Clifford Isaacs

- Knights won the toss and elected to bat.

20 November 2016
Scorecard

Titans; 185/4 (20 overs)	v	Dolphins; 127/8 (20 overs)
Farhaan Behardien 65* (33); Cameron Delport 1/11 (2 overs)		Morné van Wyk 41 (33); Shaun von Berg 3/25 (4 overs)

Titans won by 58 runs
Mangaung Oval, Bloemfontein
Umpires: Johan Cloete and Allahudien Paleker

- Dolphins won the toss and elected to field.

20 November 2016
Scorecard

Warriors; 157/5 (20 overs)	v	Knights; 115 (18.2 overs)
Christiaan Jonker 48* (27); Duanne Olivier 1/20 (4 overs)		Patrick Botha 25 (22); Basheeru-Deen Walters 3/16 (3 overs)

Warriors won by 42 runs
Mangaung Oval, Bloemfontein
Umpires: Stephen Harris and Clifford Isaacs

- Warriors won the toss and elected to bat.

20 November 2016
Scorecard

Lions; 165/5 (20 overs)	v	Cape Cobras; 66/3 (6 overs)
Mangaliso Mosehle 58 (40); Rory Kleinveldt 2/24 (4 overs)		Kieron Pollard 26 (12); Willem Mulder 1/11 (1 over)

Lions won by 3 runs (D/L method)
Senwes Park, Potchefstroom
Umpires: Shaun George and Adrian Holdstock

- Lions won the toss and elected to bat.

23 November 2016 (D/N)
Scorecard

Cape Cobras	v	Dolphins

No result
Newlands, Cape Town
Umpires: Shaun George and Adrian Holdstock

- Dolphins won the toss and elected to field.
- No play was possible due to rain.

25 November 2016
Scorecard

Knights; 153/4 (20 overs)	v	Dolphins; 154/2 (18.3 overs)
Theunis de Bruyn 63* (41); Cameron Delport 3/26 (4 overs)		Morne van Wyk 56 (43); Shadley van Schalkwyk 1/21 (3 overs)

Dolphins won by 8 wickets
Mangaung Oval, Bloemfontein
Umpires: Adrian Holdstock and Allahudien Paleker

- Knights won the toss and elected to bat.

25 November 2016 (D/N)
Scorecard

Warriors; 152/5 (20 overs)	v	Lions; 153/4 (17.5 overs)
Mangaliso Mosehle 49 (28); JJ Smuts 2/15 (4 overs)		Christiaan Jonker 49* (18); Hardus Viljoen 2/30 (4 overs)

Warriors won by 6 wickets
St George's Park, Port Elizabeth
Umpires: Shaun George and Stephen Harris

- Lions won the toss and elected to bat.

25 November 2016 (D/N)
Scorecard

Cape Cobras; 115/4 (10 overs)	v	Titans; 7/0 (1 over)
Richard Levi 45 (27); Malusi Siboto 2/22 (2 overs)		Aiden Markram 6* (3)

No result
Centurion Park, Centurion
Umpires: Bongani Jele and Dennis Smith

- Titans won the toss and elected to field.

27 November 2016
Scorecard

Titans; 168/5 (20 overs)	v	Knights; 158/6 (20 overs)
Heino Kuhn 40 (27); Marchant de Lange 2/32 (4 overs)		Patrick Kruger 79 (60); Malusi Siboto 2/25 (3 overs)

Titans won by 10 runs
Diamond Oval, Kimberley
Umpires: Adrian Holdstock and Allahudien Paleker

- Knights won the toss and elected to field.

27 November 2016
Scorecard

Lions; 175/5 (20 overs)	v	Dolphins; 169/9 (20 overs)
Mangaliso Mosehle 45 (25); Imran Tahir 2/32 (4 overs)		Robbie Frylinck 49 (20); Bjorn Fortuin 3/23 (4 overs)

Lions won by 6 runs
New Wanderers Stadium, Johannesburg
Umpires: Bongani Jele and Brad White

- Lions won the toss and elected to bat.

30 November 2016 (D/N)
Scorecard

Knights; 93 (19.4 overs)	v	Warriors; 94/2 (11.2 overs)
Patrick Kruger 37 (26); Ayabulela Gqamane 2/10 (2 overs)		JJ Smuts 49* (35); Aubrey Swanepoel 1/1 (1 overs)

Warriors won by 8 wickets
St George's Park, Port Elizabeth
Umpires: Lubabalo Gcuma and Dennis Smith

- Knights won the toss and elected to bat.

30 November 2016 (D/N)
Scorecard

Titans; 170/4 (20 overs)	v	Dolphins; 171/4 (19.2 overs)
Farhaan Behardien 72* (40); Robbie Frylinck 2/37 (4 overs)		Cameron Delport 62 (33); Shaun von Berg 2/26 (4 overs)

Dolphins won by 6 wickets
Kingsmead, Durban
Umpires: Johan Cloete and Allahudien Paleker

- Titans won the toss and elected to bat.

2 December 2016 (D/N)
Scorecard

Lions; 182/5 (20 overs)	v	Knights; 162/6 (20 overs)
Nicky van den Bergh 57 (35); Aubrey Swanepoel 1/20 (3 overs)		Leus du Plooy 45 (33); Bjorn Fortuin 4/39 (4 overs)

Lions won by 20 runs
Diamond Oval, Kimberley
Umpires: Bongani Jele and Allahudien Paleker

- Lions won the toss and elected to bat.

2 December 2016 (D/N)
Scorecard

Titans; 147 (19.2 overs)	v	Warriors; 148/4 (18.5 overs)
David Wiese 36 (28); Andrew Birch 5/16 (3.2 overs)		Colin Ackermann 53 (34); Albie Morkel 2/16 (3 overs)

Warriors won by 6 wickets
Centurion Park, Centurion
Umpires: Lubabalo Gcuma and Dennis Smith

- Warriors won the toss and elected to field.

4 December 2016
Scorecard

Lions; 157 (19.5 overs)	v	Warriors; 152 (20 overs)
Rassie van der Dussen 50 (25); Colin Ackermann 3/23 (4 overs)		Colin Ingram 47 (28); Hardus Viljoen 3/16 (4 overs)

Lions won by 5 runs
Kingsmead, Durban
Umpires: Lubabalo Gcuma and Brad White

- Lions won the toss and elected to bat.

4 December 2016
Scorecard

Dolphins; 178/5 (20 overs)	v	Cape Cobras; 181/3 (18.4 overs)
Kevin Pietersen 79 (51); Rory Kleinveldt 3/31 (3 overs)		Richard Levi 54 (31); Mthokozisi Shezi 1/33 (3.3 overs)

Cape Cobras won by 7 wickets
Kingsmead, Durban
Umpires: Shaun George and Adrian Holdstock

- Dolphins won the toss and elected to bat.

7 December 2016 (D/N)
Scorecard

Titans; 230/5 (20 overs)	v	Lions; 184/7 (20 overs)
Jonathan Vandiar 67 (41); Aaron Phangiso 2/28 (3 overs)		Rassie van der Dussen 45 (18); Malusi Siboto 3/27 (2 overs)

Titans won by 46 runs
Centurion Park, Centurion
Umpires: Lubabalo Gcuma and Adrian Holdstock

- Lions won the toss and elected to field.

7 December 2016 (D/N)
Scorecard

Knights; 146/8 (20 overs)	v	Cape Cobras; 152/2 (14.4 overs)
Theunis de Bruyn 52 (41); Wayne Parnell 3/20 (4 overs)		Richard Levi 58 (32); Mbulelo Budaza 1/24 (2 overs)

Cape Cobras won by 8 wickets
Newlands, Cape Town
Umpires: Shaun George and Bongani Jele

- Knights won the toss and elected to bat.

7 December 2016 (D/N)
Scorecard

Dolphins; 216/5 (20 overs)	v	Warriors; 217/3 (19 overs)
Kevin Pietersen 81 (46); Basheeru-Deen Walters 3/46 (4 overs)		JJ Smuts 107* (58); Mthokozisi Shezi 2/37 (4 overs)

Warriors won by 7 wickets
Buffalo Park, East London
Umpires: Stephen Harris and Brad White

- Dolphins won the toss and elected to bat.

9 December 2016 (D/N)
Scorecard

Warriors	v	Cape Cobras

Match abandoned
St George's Park, Port Elizabeth
Umpires: Shaun George and Bongani Jele

- No toss.
- No play was possible due to rain.

9 December 2016 (D/N)
Scorecard

Lions; 125/8 (20 overs)	v	Knights; 112/2 (18 overs)
Willem Mulder 35 (27); Corné Dry 2/27 (4 overs)		Rudi Second 52* (55); Dwaine Pretorius 1/13 (2 overs)

Knights won by 3 runs (D/L method)
Senwes Park, Potchefstroom
Umpires: Allahudien Paleker and Dennis Smith

- Knights won the toss and elected to field.

11 December 2016
Scorecard

Lions; 139/8 (20 overs)	v	Cape Cobras; 117 (19 overs)
Rassie van der Dussen 56 (44); Wayne Parnell 3/22 (4 overs)		Richard Levi 41 (33); Eddie Leie 4/26 (4 overs)

Lions won by 22 runs
Boland Park, Paarl
Umpires: Adrian Holdstock and Dennis Smith

- Cape Cobras won the toss and elected to field.

11 December 2016
Scorecard

Titans; 80/2 (5 overs)	v	Warriors; 74/2 (5 overs)
Farhaan Behardien 55* (15); Basheeru-Deen Walters 1/4 (1 over)		Christiaan Jonker 26 (9); David Wiese 1/6 (1 over)

Titans won by 6 runs
Buffalo Park, East London
Umpires: Lubabalo Gcuma and Bongani Jele

- Warriors won the toss and elected to field.

11 December 2016
Scorecard

Dolphins; 59/5 (8 overs)	v	Knights; 68/1 (6 overs)
Khaya Zondo 22* (8); Mbulelo Budaza 2/13 (2 overs)		Patrick Kruger 34* (19); Mthokozisi Shezi 1/8 (1 over)

Knights won by 9 wickets (D/L method)
Kingsmead, Durban
Umpires: Allahudien Paleker and Brad White

- Knights won the toss and elected to field.

== Finals ==
=== Qualifier ===
13 December 2016 (D/N)
Scorecard

Lions; 136/7 (20 overs)	v	Warriors; 138/3 (18.2 overs)
Reeza Hendricks 32 (32); Colin Ingram 2/24 (4 overs)		Colin Ingram 56* (46); Dwaine Pretorius 1/17 (3 overs)

Warriors won by 7 wickets
St George's Park, Port Elizabeth
Umpires: Shaun George and Adrian Holdstock

- Lions won the toss and elected to bat.

=== Final ===
16 December 2016 (D/N)
Scorecard

Titans; 155/6 (20 overs)	v	Warriors; 149/6 (20 overs)
Aiden Markram 33 (25); Ayabulela Gqamane 1/8 (1 over)		Colin Ackermann 34 (33); Lungi Ngidi 2/27 (4 overs)

Titans won by 6 runs
Centurion Park, Centurion
Umpires: Bongani Jele and Allahudien Paleker

- Warriors won the toss and elected to field.
