= List of cricketers banned for corruption =

List of cricketers

In cricket, match fixing occurs as a match is played to a completely or partially pre-determined result, violating the rules of the game and often the law. In particular, players have been approached by bookmakers and bribed to throw matches or aspects of matches (such as the toss), or provide other essential information. Fixing has happened in both international - including Test matches and One Day Internationals - and domestic cricket. Banning a cricketer from playing cricket for varying durations may be one of the penalties for those found guilty of match-fixing charges. Such a ban is issued by the International Cricket Council (ICC), the sport's governing body, or by the respective cricket board to which the offending player belongs. A ban may be for match fixing or spot-fixing. Both are misdemeanours banned under the ICC Cricket Code of Conduct.

== International cricket ==
	Player	National team	Length of ban	Details	Reference
1	Saleem Malik	Pakistan	Life ban (Overturned in 2008)	Banned in 2000 for offering bribes. First cricketer to be banned for lifetime for corruption, and also first cricketer to be jailed.	
2	Ata-ur-Rehman	Pakistan	Life ban (lifted in 2006)	Banned in 2000 for dealings with bookmakers.	
3	Mohammad Azharuddin	India	Life ban (Overturned in 2012)	Alleged in 2000 for associating with bookmakers and for allegedly providing information to bookies and introducing Hansie Cronje to betting. On 8 November 2012, the life ban was overturned as the case was deemed unsustainable	
4	Ajay Sharma	India	Life ban (later lifted by BCCI in 2014)	Found guilty in 2000 for associating with bookmakers.	
5	Ajay Jadeja	India	5 years (Overturned in 2003)	Alleged to have associated with bookmakers.	
6	Manoj Prabhakar	India	5 years	In 2000 he tried to implicate Kapil Dev and others, but it backfired as he was found guilty himself.	
7	Hansie Cronje	South Africa	Life ban	Guilty of accepting monetary rewards from bookmakers for providing information and for fixing matches.	
8	Herschelle Gibbs	South Africa	6 months	Initially agreed to under-perform in an ODI game at Nagpur, but reneged on the deal and scored 74 off just 53 balls.	
9	Henry Williams	South Africa	6 months	Initially agreed to under-perform in an ODI game at Nagpur by conceding more than 50 runs off 10 overs, however got injured after bowling 11 legitimate deliveries and 6 wides, conceding 11 runs.	
10	Maurice Odumbe	Kenya	5 years	Receiving money from bookmakers.	
11	Marlon Samuels	West Indies	2 years	Passing on team information to an alleged bookmaker.	
12	Mohammad Amir	Pakistan	5 years	Bowling planned no-balls against England in August 2010. In November 2011 he was sentenced to six months in a young offenders institution by Southwark Crown Court, England, for conspiracy to cheat at gambling and conspiracy to accept corrupt payments.	
13	Mohammad Asif	Pakistan	7 years (2 years suspended)	Bowling planned no-balls against England in August 2010. In November 2011 he was sentenced to 12 months in prison by Southwark Crown Court, England, for conspiracy to cheat at gambling and conspiracy to accept corrupt payments.	
14	Salman Butt	Pakistan	10 years (5 years suspended)	Orchestrating the bowling of no-balls against England in August 2010. In November 2011 he was sentenced to 2 years and 6 months in prison by Southwark Crown Court, England, for conspiracy to cheat at gambling and conspiracy to accept corrupt payments.	
15	Danish Kaneria	Pakistan	Life ban	Arrested in 2010 by police investigating "match irregularities" whilst playing for Essex, but was cleared of allegations. However, he was found guilty by an England and Wales Cricket Board disciplinary panel and banned for life, a decision which the Pakistan Cricket Board agree to abide to. Kaneria appealed the decision in 2013 but the ban was upheld. In October 2018, Kaneria finally admits to his involvement in 2009 spot-fixing scandal.	
16	Mohammad Ashraful	Bangladesh	8 years (3 years suspended)	Banned for his involvement in fixing in the 2013 season of the Bangladesh Premier League season 2.	
17	Shariful Haque	Bangladesh	Indefinite period	Banned in September 2012 for approaching players to fix matches in the Bangladesh Premier League	
18	Lou Vincent	New Zealand	Life ban (Partially overturned in 2023)	Initially banned for failure to report an approach to fix a game in the Bangladesh Premier League for 3 years but was then banned for life after match fixing in English Domestic Cricket.	
19	Kaushal Lokuarachchi	Sri Lanka	18 months	Banned for failure to report an approach to fix a game in the Bangladesh Premier League.	
20	Gulam Bodi	South Africa	20 years	Attempting to fix matches in the Ram Slam Twenty20 competition matches in South Africa.	
21	Irfan Ahmed	Hong Kong	30 months	Banned in April 2016 for failure to disclose "full details of approaches or invitations to engage in corrupt conduct that had been made to him between January 2012 and January 2014"	
22	Thami Tsolekile	South Africa	12 years	Banned in August 2016 for "contriving to fix" in the 2015 Ram Slam, and failing to disclose the full details of an approach.	
23	Sharjeel Khan	Pakistan	5 years	Banned in August 2017 for spot-fixing charges in the Pakistan Super League.	
24	Lonwabo Tsotsobe	South Africa	8 years	Banned in August 2015 over match fixing	
25	Alviro Petersen	South Africa	2 years	Banned in 2016 over match fixing	
26	Shakib Al Hasan	Bangladesh	1 year	Banned from all cricket for failing to report bookie approaches in October 2019	
27	Umar Akmal	Pakistan	3 years	Banned from all cricket in April 2020 for failing to report corrupt approaches	
28	Shafiqullah Shafaq	Afghanistan	6 years	Banned from all cricket in May 2020 for attempting to fix matches in the 2019-20 Bangladesh Premier League and 2018 Afghanistan Premier League.	
29	Shaiman Anwar	United Arab Emirates	8 years	Banned from all cricket in March 2021 for attempting to fix matches in the ICC Men's T20 World Cup Qualifier in April 2019.	
30	Mohammad Naveed	United Arab Emirates	8 years	Banned from all cricket in March 2021 for attempting to fix matches in the ICC Men's T20 World Cup Qualifier in April 2019.	
31	Qadeer Ahmed	United Arab Emirates	5 years	Banned from all cricket in April 2021 for attempting to fix matches in the ICC Men's T20 World Cup Qualifier in April 2019.	
32	Amir Hayat	United Arab Emirates	8 years	Banned from all cricket in July 2021 for attempting to fix matches in the ICC Men's T20 World Cup Qualifier in April 2019.	
33	Ashfaq Ahmed	United Arab Emirates	8 years	Banned from all cricket in July 2021 for attempting to fix matches in the ICC Men's T20 World Cup Qualifier in April 2019.	
34	Heath Streak	Zimbabwe	8 years	Heath Streak accepted two bitcoins (worth ~$35,000) and an iPhone from a corruptor named Deepak Agarwal ("Mr. X"). In return, he disclosed inside information on T20 franchise leagues and facilitated corrupt approaches to other players, even deleted messages during inquiry.	
35	Shohely Akhter	Bangladesh	5 years	First female cricketer banned for corruption after receiving a five-year suspension for offering a teammate 2 million Taka via Facebook Voice Notes to spot-fix during the 2023 Women's T20 World Cup, an offer the player rejected and reported to the ICC.	

== Domestic cricket ==
Year	Player	Domestic team	Length of ban	Details	Reference
2012	(England) Mervyn Westfield	Essex	5 years	Arrested in 2010 by police investigating "match irregularities" whilst playing for Essex. He was convicted of conspiracy to defraud as part of a spot fixing scam and received a four-month prison sentence.	
2012	(India) TP Sudhindra	Deccan Chargers	Life ban	"Receiving a consideration to spot-fix" in a domestic game.	
2012	(India) Mohnish Mishra	Pune Warriors India	1 year	Bringing the game into disrepute through "loose talk and unsubstantiated bragging".	
2012	(India) Amit Yadav	Kings XI Punjab	1 year	Spot fixing and match fixing.	
2012	(India) Abhinav Bali	Kings XI Punjab	1 year	Spot fixing and match fixing.	
2012	(India) Shalabh Srivastava	Kings XI Punjab	5 years	Agreeing to and negotiating terms to fix a match.	
2013	(India) Ankeet Chavan	Rajasthan Royals	Life ban	Spot fixing.	
2013	(India) Amit Singh	Rajasthan Royals	5 years	Acted as a middleman between the bookies and the Rajasthan Royals cricketers.	
2013	(India) Siddharth Trivedi	Rajasthan Royals	1 year	Failed to report that bookies approached him, even though he had no involvement in match fixing or spot fixing.	
2014	(Pakistan) Naved Arif	Sussex	Life ban	Banned for life after admitting to breaching the board's Anti-Corruption Code regarding corrupt activity in connection with the CB40 fixture between Sussex and Kent at Hove in August 2011	
2013	(India) Ajit Chandila	Rajasthan Royals	Life ban	Spot fixing	
2013	(India) Hiken Shah	Mumbai	5 years	Illegal approach	
2013	(India) Shanthakumaran Nair Sreesanth	Rajasthan Royals	Life ban (reduced to 7 years)	Gave 14 runs in an over as planned in an IPL match for Rajasthan Royals against Kings XI Punjab on 9 May 2013. He was arrested on 16 May 2013 for accepting money from bookies to underperform, but was released on bail a month later and acquitted by court .	
2016	(South Africa) Ethy Mbhalati	Titans	10 years	Spot Fixing	
2016	(South Africa) Jean Symes	Highveld Lions	7 years	Failing to report a payment	
2016	(South Africa) Pumelela Matshikwe	Highveld Lions	10 years	Spot Fixing	
2017	(Pakistan) Sharjeel Khan			Spot Fixing in PSL	
2017	(Pakistan) Nasir Jamshed			Spot Fixing in PSL	
2017	(Pakistan) Khalid Latif			Spot Fixing in PSL	
2017	(Pakistan) Mohammad Irfan			Penalised for not reporting approach by bookies in PSL	
2017	(Pakistan) Mohammad Nawaz			Suspended for failing to report a suspect approach in PSL	
2018	(Pakistan) Shahzaib Hasan			Banned for failing to disclose a fixing offer during the PSL	
2023	(Pakistan) Asif Afridi	Khyber Pakhtunkhwa	2 years	Banned for two breaches of the board's Anti-Corruption Code	
2023	(Cricket West Indies) Marlon Samuels		6 years	Banned for accepting favours that brought himself and the game into disrepute and concealing information from the investigating authorities	
2024	(Cricket West Indies) Devon Thomas	Kandy Falcons	5 years	Banned for seven charges including match-fixing	
2024	(Bangladesh) Nasir Hossain		2 years	Banned for failing to report payment and two other charges	
2024	(Sri Lanka) Praveen Jayawickrama	Jaffna Kings	1 year	Banned for failing to report a match-fixing approach and obstructing investigation	
2026	(United States) Akhilesh Reddy	Aspin Stallions	8 years	Banned for three charges including match-fixing and obstructing an investigation	
