= Zimbabwean cricket team in South Africa in 2017–18 =

International cricket tour

	South Africa	Zimbabwe
- Dates: 26 – 29 December 2017
Captains	Faf du Plessis (Note: Faf du Plessis was ruled out of the Test match and was replaced by AB de Villiers.)	Graeme Cremer

Test series
- Result: South Africa won the 1-match series 1–0
Most runs	Aiden Markram (125)	Kyle Jarvis (28)
Most wickets	Andile Phehlukwayo (5); Morné Morkel (5); Keshav Maharaj (5)	Kyle Jarvis (3); Christopher Mpofu (3)

The Zimbabwe cricket team toured South Africa in December 2017 to play a four-day Test match as a day/night fixture which started on Boxing Day. Zimbabwe last played a Test match in South Africa in March 2005. Ahead of the Test match, there was also a three-day day/night match between Zimbabwe and a Cricket South Africa Invitation XI. The Test match finished inside two days, with South Africa winning by an innings and 120 runs.

Despite being a four-day match, Cricket South Africa sought approval from the International Cricket Council (ICC) to grant the fixture Test match status. The ICC approved the request for Test status in October 2017 at their board meeting in Auckland. The trial of the four-day Test format by the ICC will run until the 2019 Cricket World Cup. Per the ICC's playing conditions, a minimum of 98 overs are to be bowled each day, with the follow-on set at a lead of 150 runs, instead of 200 runs in a five-day game. The last time a four-day Test match was played was in 1973, between New Zealand and Pakistan.

== Summary ==
South African cricketers Faf du Plessis and Dean Elgar expressed their concerns about a four-day Test match. Captain du Plessis said that "I believe the great Test matches have gone to the last hour of the last day on day five" and opening batsman Elgar said "I don't think you should tinker with something that's not broken". Zimbabwe's captain Graeme Cremer was more positive saying "everyone is excited to be part of the historical Test match".

A day before the Test match, Faf du Plessis picked up a viral infection, putting him in doubt for the match. On the morning of the Test, he was ruled out of the fixture, with AB de Villiers replacing him as captain. De Villiers also kept wicket during the match, as South Africa's wicket-keeper Quinton de Kock suffered a hamstring injury while batting on day one.

Following their victory in the Test, AB de Villiers said that "the bowlers were exceptional on a very spicy wicket but we still needed to do the basics well". Graeme Cremer said "we knew it was going to be tough, but maybe not this tough" before criticising Zimbabwe's first-class cricket, saying that the standards are nowhere near those of South Africa and Australia. Zimbabwe's coach Heath Streak also criticised the lack of Test cricket played by Zimbabwe saying that they need to play more than three or four matches a year.

The Test match became the second-shortest completed match, in terms of balls bowled, in the last fifty years, with 907 deliveries needed to finish the game. The previous shortest Test in the last fifty years, by balls bowled, was between Pakistan and Australia in October 2002, which was completed in 893 deliveries. The only Test played in South Africa to be completed in fewer deliveries was played in Cape Town in 1899, when England won the match in 796 balls. The last occurrence of a Test match being won in two days also featured South Africa and Zimbabwe, when South Africa won by an innings and 21 runs in Cape Town in March 2005. South Africa took all 20 wickets with 436 deliveries, the fewest balls bowled by them to do this in a Test. Their previous record was 440 deliveries against India in 1996, also a Boxing Day Test match.

== Squads ==
South Africa	Zimbabwe
~~Faf du Plessis (c)~~; Hashim Amla; Temba Bavuma; Quinton de Kock (wk); Theunis de Bruyn; AB de Villiers; Dean Elgar; Keshav Maharaj; Aiden Markram; Morné Morkel; Andile Phehlukwayo; Vernon Philander; Kagiso Rabada; Dale Steyn	Graeme Cremer (c); Ryan Burl; Regis Chakabva; Tendai Chatara; Chamunorwa Chibhabha; Tendai Chisoro; Craig Ervine; Kyle Jarvis; Hamilton Masakadza; Solomon Mire; Peter Moor; Christopher Mpofu; Blessing Muzarabani; Sikandar Raza; Brendan Taylor (wk)

== Tour match ==
=== Three-day: Cricket South Africa Invitation XI vs Zimbabwe ===
20–22 December 2017 (D/N)
Scorecard

Zimbabwe	v	Cricket South Africa Invitation XI
196 (71.5 overs); Hamilton Masakadza 79 (181); Lizaad Williams 3/12 (8.5 overs)		287 (78 overs); Temba Bavuma 70 (77); Graeme Cremer 4/67 (20 overs)
243 (74.3 overs); Chamu Chibhabha 55 (110); Lizaad Williams 4/47 (15.3 overs)		154/5 (38.2 overs); Ricardo Vasconcelos 57* (51); Graeme Cremer 4/44 (13 overs)

Cricket South Africa Invitation XI won by 5 wickets
Boland Park, Paarl
Umpires: Murray Brown (SA) and Dennis Smith (SA)

- Zimbabwe won the toss and elected to bat.
- 14 players per side (11 batting, 11 fielding).

== Test series ==
=== Only Test ===
26–29 December 2017 (Note: While four days of play were scheduled for the Test, the match reached a result within two days.) (D/N)
Scorecard

South Africa	v	Zimbabwe
309/9d (78.3 overs); Aiden Markram 125 (204); Kyle Jarvis 3/57 (19 overs)		68 (30.1 overs); Kyle Jarvis 23 (50); Morné Morkel 5/21 (11 overs)
		121 (42.3 overs) (f/o); Craig Ervine 23 (58); Keshav Maharaj 5/59 (17.3 overs)

South Africa won by an innings and 120 runs
St. George's Park, Port Elizabeth
Umpires: Richard Kettleborough (Eng) and Paul Reiffel (Aus)
Player of the match: Aiden Markram (SA)

- South Africa won the toss and elected to bat.
- Ryan Burl and Blessing Muzarabani (Zim) both made their Test debuts.
- This was the first day/night Test played in South Africa and the first to feature Zimbabwe.
