= Craig Alexander =

Craig Alexander may refer to:

- Craig Alexander (cricketer) (born 1987), South African cricketer
- Craig Alexander (triathlete) (born 1973), Australian Ironman and 70.3 world champion
