= Zimbabwean cricket team in South Africa in 2004–05 =

Zimbabwe in South Africa in 2004–05
	Zimbabwe	South Africa
- Dates: 16 February – 13 March 2005
Captains	Tatenda Taibu	Graeme Smith (Tests, 1st and 2nd ODI); Nicky Boje (3rd ODI)

Test series
- Result: South Africa won the 2-match series 2–0
Most runs	Hamilton Masakadza (125)	Graeme Smith (162)
Most wickets	Graeme Cremer (6)	Jacques Kallis (11)
- Player of the series: Jacques Kallis (SA)

One Day International series
- Results: South Africa won the 3-match series 3–0
Most runs	Heath Streak (68)	Graeme Smith (167)
Most wickets	Chris Mpofu (4)	Albie Morkel (5)
- Player of the series: Graeme Smith (SA)

The Zimbabwe national cricket team toured South Africa from 16 February to 13 March 2005 for a three-match One Day International series and two Test matches. South Africa won all five matches by significant margins.

== ODI series ==
=== 1st ODI ===
25 February 2005 (D/N)
Scorecard

South Africa; 301/7 (50 overs)	v	Zimbabwe; 136 (37.2 overs)
Adam Bacher 56 (73); Prosper Utseya 3/40 (10 overs)		Tatenda Taibu 28 (48); Andrew Hall 3/29 (7.2 overs)

South Africa won by 165 runs
New Wanderers Stadium, Johannesburg
Umpires: Daryl Harper (Aus) and Ian Howell (SA)
Player of the match: Mark Boucher (SA)

- Zimbabwe won the toss and elected to field.
- Sean Williams (Zim) made his ODI debut.

=== 2nd ODI ===
27 February 2005
Scorecard

South Africa; 329/6 (50 overs)	v	Zimbabwe; 198/7 (50 overs)
Graeme Smith 117 (129); Chris Mpofu 3/59 (9 overs)		Barney Rogers 47 (72); Albie Morkel 2/27 (7 overs)

South Africa won by 131 runs
Kingsmead, Durban
Umpires: Billy Doctrove (WI) and Brian Jerling (SA)
Player of the match: Graeme Smith (SA)

- Zimbabwe won the toss and elected to field.

=== 3rd ODI ===
2 March 2005 (D/N)
Scorecard

Zimbabwe; 206/8 (50 overs)	v	South Africa; 207/5 (46.3 overs)
Heath Streak 68 (105); Charl Langeveldt 2/40 (10 overs)		Justin Kemp 78* (81); Tawanda Mupariwa 2/25 (7 overs)

South Africa won by 5 wickets
St George's Oval, Port Elizabeth
Umpires: Daryl Harper (Aus) and Ian Howell (SA)
Player of the match: Justin Kemp (SA)

- Zimbabwe won the toss and elected to bat.

== Test series ==
=== 1st Test ===
4–5 March 2005
Scorecard

Zimbabwe	v	South Africa
54 (31.2 overs); Stuart Matsikenyeri 12 (32); Jacques Kallis 4/13 (7.2 overs)		340/3d (50 overs); Graeme Smith 121 (107); Graeme Cremer 3/86 (9 overs)
265 (75.2 overs); Dion Ebrahim 72 (153); Nicky Boje 4/106 (26.2 overs)

South Africa won by an innings and 21 runs
Newlands, Cape Town
Umpires: Billy Bowden (NZ) and Billy Doctrove (WI)
Player of the match: Jacques Kallis (SA)

- Zimbabwe won the toss and elected to bat.
- Zimbabwe's score of 54 in their first innings was their lowest in Test history.

=== 2nd Test ===
11–13 March 2005
Scorecard

Zimbabwe	v	South Africa
269 (85 overs); Heath Streak 85 (154); Jacques Kallis 4/33 (13 overs)		480/7d (109.5 overs); Ashwell Prince 139* (218); Graeme Cremer 3/106 (26.5 overs)
149 (59.3 overs); Hamilton Masakadza 47 (97); Monde Zondeki 6/39 (14.3 overs)

South Africa won by an innings and 62 runs
SuperSport Park, Centurion
Umpires: Billy Doctrove (WI) and Daryl Harper (Aus)
Player of the match: Monde Zondeki (SA)

- South Africa won the toss and elected to field.

== Tour matches ==
=== List A: Combined Gauteng–North West XI vs Zimbabweans ===
16 February 2005
Scorecard

Combined Gauteng–North West XI; 229/7 (50 overs)	v	Zimbabweans; 232/3 (44.1 overs)
Blake Snijman 97 (125); Barney Rogers 3/38 (7 overs)		Hamilton Masakadza 103* (120); Eugene Moleon 1/30 (7 overs)

Zimbabweans won by 7 wickets
Sedgars Park, Potchefstroom
Umpires: Mike Gajjar and Barry Lambson
Player of the match: Hamilton Masakadza (Zimbabweans)

- Zimbabweans won the toss and elected to field.
- Eddie Leie (Combined Gauteng–North West XI) made his List A debut.

=== First-class: Combined Easterns–Northerns XI vs Zimbabweans ===
18–21 February 2005
Scorecard

Zimbabweans	v	Combined Easterns–Northerns XI
206 (60.4 overs); Elton Chigumbura 40 (60); Siraag Abrahams 3/36 (7.4 overs)		275 (71.2 overs); Andre Seymore 82 (104); Tawanda Mupariwa 3/82 (19 overs)
233 (87.1 overs); Sean Williams 82* (172); Morné Morkel 6/66 (27.1 overs)

Match drawn
Willowmoore Park, Benoni
Umpires: Murray Brown and Gerrie Pienaar

- Combined Easterns–Northerns XI won the toss and elected to field.
- Heinrich Malan and Cobus Pienaar (both Combined Easterns–Northerns XI) made their first-class debuts.
