= Brad White (cricketer) =

South African cricketer and umpire (born 1970)

Personal information
- Full name: Brad Middleton White
- Born: 15 May 1970 (age 56); Port Elizabeth, South Africa

Umpiring information
- T20Is umpired: 6 (2022)
- WODIs umpired: 24 (2005–2021)
- WT20Is umpired: 6 (2013–2019)
- Source: Cricinfo, 6 November 2015

Brad White (born 15 May 1970) is a South African cricket umpire and former first-class cricketer. He has umpired in matches in the 2015–16 Ram Slam T20 Challenge. In November 2018, he was part of an umpire exchange programme in India, and stood in the 2018–19 Ranji Trophy match between Tamil Nadu and Bengal. He is part of Cricket South Africa's umpire panel for first-class matches. In January 2022, in the 2021–22 CSA 4-Day Series, White stood in his 150th first-class match as an on-field umpire.
