= Cobus Pienaar =

South African cricketer (born 1985)

Personal information
- Full name: Jacobus Johannes Pienaar
- Born: 23 October 1985 (age 41); Klerksdorp, South Africa
- Source: ESPNcricinfo, 29 October 2016

Cobus Pienaar (born 23 October 1985) is a South African former cricketer. He made his first-class debut for Combined Easterns–Northerns XI against Zimbabweans during Zimbabwe's tour to South Africa in 2005.
