= Juan de Villiers =

South African cricketer (born 1989)

Personal information
- Full name: Juan Pierre de Villiers
- Born: 5 April 1989 (age 37)
- Batting: Right-handed
- Bowling: Right-arm fast-medium
- Role: All-rounder
- Source: ESPNcricinfo, April 26, 2016

Juan Pierre de Villiers (born 5 April 1989) is a South African first-class cricketer who plays for the Titans cricket team.
