= Daryn Smit =

South African cricketer

Personal information
- Full name: Daryn Smit
- Born: 28 January 1984 (age 42); Durban, Natal, South Africa
- Batting: Right-handed
- Bowling: Right-arm leg break
- Role: Batsman, wicket-keeper

Domestic team information
- Years: Team
- 2003/04–2016/17: Dolphins (squad no. 28)
- 2004/05–2016/17: KwaZulu-Natal
- 2017–2021: Derbyshire (squad no. 11)
- FC debut: 7 October 2004 KZN v Easterns
- LA debut: 10 October 2004 KZN v Easterns

Career statistics
Competition	FC	LA	T20
Matches	137	124	112
Runs scored	6,077	2,164	966
Batting average	35.53	31.82	25.42
100s/50s	9/33	1/11	0/2
Top score	156*	109	57
Balls bowled	6,749	2,107	630
Wickets	106	45	28
Bowling average	33.02	38.17	25.75
5 wickets in innings	3	0	0
10 wickets in match	0	0	0
Best bowling	7/27	4/39	3/19
Catches/stumpings	361/22	115/13	62/11
- Source: CricketArchive, 15 August 2021

Daryn Smit (born 28 January 1984) is a retired South African cricketer and former captain for the Dolphins. He is a right-handed batsmen, spin bowler and wicket keeper as well as being a commentator for South African broadcaster Supersport, and has been described as 'Daryn of all trades' due to his all around talents. He has played first class, one day and Twenty20 cricket since 2004.

Smit gave up leg spin bowling to increase his chances of selection for the South African national team as a wicket keeper, having once been tipped as the successor of Mark Boucher. Having failed to achieve a call-up, Smit subsequently resumed bowling for the Dolphins.

Smit captained the Dolphins for a number of years but was replaced as captain by Morne Van Wyk, who was signed from South African franchise the Knights.

In March 2017, Smit signed a two-year contract to play county cricket in England for Derbyshire.
