= Thami Tsolekile =

South African cricketer (born 1980)

- Born: Thami Lungisa Tsolekile; 9 October 1980 (age 46); Cape Town, Cape Province, South Africa
- Relatives: Lungile Tsolekile (Cousin)
- Field hockey career
- Sport: Field hockey
National team
Years	Team	Caps	Goals
?-2000	South Africa		-
Medal record
Representing South Africa
African Cup of Nations
Gold medal – first place	2000 Bulawayo
- Cricket career

Cricket information
- Batting: Right-handed
- Bowling: Right-arm off spin
- Role: Wicket-keeper

International information
- National side: South Africa
- Test debut (cap 294): 20 November 2004 v India
- Last Test: 17 December 2004 v England

Domestic team information
- Years: Team
- 1998/99–2008/09: Western Province
- 2005/06–2007/08: Cape Cobras
- 2009/10–2015/16: Lions

Career statistics
Competition	Test	FC	LA	T20
Matches	3	160	142	80
Runs scored	47	5,844	1,470	706
Batting average	9.40	30.43	21.30	21.39
100s/50s	0/0	6/29	0/4	0/2
Top score	22	159	68	58
Catches/stumpings	6/0	499/35	186/23	49/14
- Source: CricketArchive, 9 July 2021

Thami Lungisa Tsolekile (born 9 October 1980) is a South African former cricketer who played three Test matches for the national team as a wicketkeeper in 2004–05. He was educated in Cape Town at Pinelands High School.

In first-class cricket, Tsolekile was a regular wicketkeeper and captain of the Cape Cobras. At the beginning of the 2009/10 season, he moved up to Johannesburg to play for the Highveld Lions, after losing his place in the Cape Cobras team to Ryan Canning. During the season, he scored his second first-class century and improved his highest score to 151 not out in a drawn match against Warriors at East London. He was involved in a South African domestic record partnership of 365 for the sixth wicket with opener Stephen Cook, who went on to make a record 390.

He also played hockey for his country at international level, scoring on debut, and played football during his childhood.

On 11 July 2012, Tsolekile was selected to play in South Africa's Test squad against England.

On 8 August 2016, Tsolekile was handed a 12-year ban for his role in numerous match-fixing violations in 2015. Jean Symes (7 years), Ethy Mbhalati (10 years), Lonwabo Tsotsobe (8 years) and Pumelela Matshikwe (10 years) also received similar bans from Cricket South Africa for their involvement in the various match-fixing activities.
