= Siraag Abrahams =

South African cricketer (born 1982)

Personal information
- Born: 3 July 1982 (age 44); Cape Town
- Batting: Right-handed
- Bowling: Right-arm fast

Domestic team information
- Years: Team
- 2003/04–2005/06: Easterns
- 2004/05: Titans
- 2005/06: Western Province
- FC debut: 17 October 2003 Easterns v Free State
- Last FC: 6 October 2005 Easterns v Northerns
- LA debut: 10 October 2004 Easterns v KwaZulu-Natal
- Last LA: 5 March 2005 Western Province v Border

Career statistics
Competition	First-class	List A
Matches	12	10
Runs scored	84	18
Batting average	6.46	9
100s/50s	0/0	0/0
Top score	15	13*
Balls bowled	1311	384
Wickets	20	11
Bowling average	40.05	29.18
5 wickets in innings	0	0
10 wickets in match	0	0
Best bowling	4/33	3/32
Catches/stumpings	1/–	2/–
- Source: CricketArchive, 2 March 2017

Siraag Abrahams (born 3 July 1982) is a South African former cricketer, who played for Easterns, Titans, and Western Province in first-class and List A cricket.
