= Somila Seyibokwe =

South African cricketer (born 1987)

Personal information
- Born: 31 October 1987 (age 39)
- Source: Cricinfo, 1 September 2015

Somila Seyibokwe (born 31 October 1987) is a South African cricketer. He was included in the Border cricket team for the 2015 Africa T20 Cup.
