= Mandla Mashimbyi =

South African cricketer (born 1980)

Personal information
- Full name: Mandla Abednigo Mashimbyi
- Born: 10 November 1980 (age 46); Phalaborwa, South Africa
- Batting: Right-handed
- Bowling: Right-arm medium-fast
- Source: Cricinfo, 18 February 2021

Mandla Mashimbyi (born 10 November 1980) is a South African former cricketer. He played in 48 first-class and 49 List A matches between 2003 and 2010. From the 2013/14 season, he became the coach of the Titans in South Africa's domestic cricket competitions. In August 2021, he was named as the bowling coach of the national team for their series against Sri Lanka, after Charl Langeveldt was ruled out of the tour due to a positive test for COVID-19.

== Coaching career ==
In November 2024, CSA appointed him as head coach of South Africa women's national cricket team.
