= Rabian Engelbrecht =

South African cricketer (born 1992)

Personal information
- Full name: Rabian Jermaine Engelbrecht
- Born: 4 November 1992; Paarl, South Africa
- Died: 25 May 2022 (aged 29); Paarl, South Africa
- Batting: Right-handed
- Bowling: Right-arm fast-medium
- Role: Bowler

Domestic team information
- Years: Team
- 2009/10–2012/13: Boland
- 2013/14–2017/18: KwaZulu-Natal
- 2014/15–2017/18: Dolphins
- First-class debut: 30 September 2010 Boland v Eastern Province
- List A debut: 27 March 2010 Boland v Western Province

Career statistics
| Competition | First-class | List A |
|---|---|---|
| Matches | 26 | 31 |
| Runs scored | 267 | 58 |
| Batting average | 12.71 | 7.25 |
| 100s/50s | 0/0 | 0/0 |
| Top score | 38 | 18 |
| Balls bowled | 3,016 | 1,230 |
| Wickets | 59 | 34 |
| Bowling average | 31.13 | 31.91 |
| 5 wickets in innings | 2 | 0 |
| 10 wickets in match | 0 | 0 |
| Best bowling | 5/18 | 4/32 |
| Catches/stumpings | 13/– | 5/– |
- Source: CricketArchive, 6 November 2025

Rabian Jermaine Engelbrecht (4 November 1992 – 25 May 2022) was a South African cricketer who played for Boland, KwaZulu-Natal and Dolphins. He was a right-handed batsman and right-arm fast-medium bowler. Engelbrecht made his first-class debut on 30 September 2010 against Eastern Province. He was included in the KwaZulu-Natal cricket team squad for the 2015 Africa T20 Cup. In August 2017, he was named in Jo'burg Giants' squad for the first season of the T20 Global League. However, in October 2017, Cricket South Africa initially postponed the tournament until November 2018, with it being cancelled soon after.

Engelbrecht died from tuberculosis in May 2022, at the age of 29.
