= Bongani Jele =

South African cricket umpire (born 1986)

Personal information
- Full name: Bongani Patrick Jele
- Born: 1 April 1986 (age 40); Pretoria, Gauteng, South Africa
- Role: Umpire

Umpiring information
- ODIs umpired: 29 (2016–2023)
- T20Is umpired: 43 (2017–2026)
- WODIs umpired: 9 (2013–2019)
- WT20Is umpired: 8 (2016–2019)
- Source: Cricinfo, 21 June 2023

Bongani Jele (born 1 April 1986) is a South African cricket umpire. He is part of Cricket South Africa's umpire panel for first-class matches. Along with Adrian Holdstock, he umpired in the final of the 2015–16 Ram Slam T20 Challenge in December 2015 and officiated in the first-class tour match between South Africa A and England XI later the same month.

He made his One Day International (ODI) umpiring debut in a match between Australia and Ireland in Benoni, South Africa, on 27 September 2016. His first Twenty20 International (T20I) match as an umpire was on 22 January 2017 when South Africa played Sri Lanka in Johannesburg. He was one of the sixteen umpires for the 2020 Under-19 Cricket World Cup tournament in South Africa.

== See also ==
- List of One Day International cricket umpires
- List of Twenty20 International cricket umpires
