= Dillon du Preez =

South African cricketer and coach

Personal information
- Full name: Dillon du Preez
- Born: 8 November 1981 (age 45); Port Elizabeth, Cape Province, South Africa
- Batting: Right-handed
- Bowling: Right arm fast-medium
- Role: Bowler

Domestic team information
- Years: Team
- 2003–2017: Free State
- 2008: Leicestershire County Cricket Club
- 2009: Royal Challengers Bangalore

Career statistics
Competition	FC	LA	T20
Matches	92	134	86
Runs scored	2,362	1,356	682
Batting average	19.84	21.87	20.05
100s/50s	2/10	1/5	0/0
Top score	122	107*	46
Balls bowled	16,079	6,228	2,040
Wickets	330	177	82
Bowling average	21.92	29.04	24.87
5 wickets in innings	14	2	0
10 wickets in match	2	0	0
Best bowling	7/108	5/31	4/25
Catches/stumpings	26/–	30/–	26/–
- Source: ESPNcricinfo, 16 October 2024

Dillon du Preez (born 8 November 1981) is a South African retired cricketer who played for the Eagles (formerly Free State) and the Royal Challengers Bangalore. He was a right-arm fast bowler and bats right-handed. He was born at Port Elizabeth.

== Playing career ==
Dillon du Preez made his debut for Free State in the 2003–04 season, appearing in a first class match against the touring West Indies national cricket team, with his first wicket being Shivnarine Chanderpaul and finishing with figures of 3 for 75. His interest in cricket began after attending a cricketing academy managed by international cricketers Corrie van Zyl and Rudi Steyn. During the 2007–08 season, du Preez led the Eagles to victory with 55 wickets. In the 2008 English county season, du Preez played for Leicestershire. In 2009, du Preez signed for the Bangalore Royal Challengers of the Indian Premier League, making his debut against the Mumbai Indians on 3 May 2009, taking two back-to-back wickets in his first over, including that of Sachin Tendulkar. In the same match, du Preez took his third IPL wicket (Jean-Paul Duminy).

Apart from being a talented and accurate fast bowler, he has often shown himself to be a capable batsman, having scored two first class centuries as well as scoring an unbeaten century in a List A match against Yorkshire, while playing for Leicestershire . He was included in the Free State cricket team squad for the 2015 Africa T20 Cup. In August 2017, he was named in Benoni Zalmi's squad for the first season of the T20 Global League. However, in October 2017, Cricket South Africa initially postponed the tournament until November 2018, with it being cancelled soon after. Du Preez retired from professional cricket in 2017.

== Coaching career ==
After retiring from playing, du Preez took up coaching and was appointed as assistant coach for the South Africa women's national cricket team in September 2020. Following Hilton Moreeng's retirement he was made interim head coach in May 2024, before Mandla Mashimbyi took on the permanent role in November 2024.
