= Werner Coetsee =

South African cricketer (born 1983)

Personal information
- Born: 16 March 1983 (age 43); Bethlehem, South Africa
- Source: Cricinfo, 4 September 2015

Werner Coetsee (born 16 March 1983) is a South African first-class cricketer. He was included in the Griqualand West cricket team squad for the 2015 Africa T20 Cup. In August 2017, he was named in Bloem City Blazers' squad for the first season of the T20 Global League. However, in October 2017, Cricket South Africa initially postponed the tournament until November 2018, with it being cancelled soon after.
