= Stephen Cook (cricketer) =

South African cricketer

Personal information
- Full name: Stephen Craig Cook
- Born: 29 November 1982 (age 43); Johannesburg, Transvaal Province, South Africa
- Batting: Right-handed
- Bowling: Right-arm medium
- Role: Opening batsman
- Relatives: SJ Cook (father)

International information
- National side: South Africa
- Test debut (cap 326): 22 January 2016 v England
- Last Test: 16 March 2017 v New Zealand

Domestic team information
- Years: Team
- 2001–2015: Gauteng
- 2004–present: Lions (squad no. 6)
- 2015–present: North West
- 2017: Durham
- 2018: Glamorgan

Career statistics
Competition	Test	FC	LA	T20
Matches	11	197	156	20
Runs scored	632	13,331	5,456	477
Batting average	33.26	40.03	39.25	23.85
100s/50s	3/2	40/54	10/40	0/2
Top score	117	390	127*	66
Balls bowled	12	798	231	–
Wickets	0	11	5	–
Bowling average	–	42.36	46.00	–
5 wickets in innings	–	0	0	–
10 wickets in match	–	0	0	–
Best bowling	–	3/42	1/2	–
Catches/stumpings	6/–	128/–	26/–	3/–
- Source: CricInfo, 7 July 2017

Stephen Craig Cook (born 29 November 1982) is a South African Test cricketer, the son of former Test player Jimmy Cook. He is a right-handed opening batsman and very occasional right-arm medium bowler who initially played for Gauteng following his debut in 2001, and since 2004 for Lions.

== Personal life ==
Cook was born in November 1982 in Johannesburg, Transvaal, son of former Test cricketer Jimmy Cook, himself an "exceptional opening batsman" with over 20,000 first-class runs.

== Domestic career ==
In 2009 he scored 390 runs in a single innings, surpassing several South African and international first-class cricket records, and was included in the South Africa A squad.

Cook holds the record highest score in South African first-class cricket – 390 from 648 balls on 25 October 2009 against the Warriors – which was also the team's first triple century. Cook had previously been a spectator to his father's own 313 and Daryll Cullinan's previous-record 337, and commented later that "When my brother and I used to play cricket in the garden, there was one score neither of us could ever go past and that was dad's. Neither of us could ever score more than 313." Cook's score is also the twelfth-highest and fourth-longest in first-class cricket history – taking over 14 hours to complete – and was part of a record-breaking 365-run partnership with Thami Tsolekile, also a record for South African first-class cricket.

In June 2018, Cook stepped down as the captain of Lions, after being in charge of the team for three seasons.

== International career ==
On 18 January 2016 he was added to South Africa's Test squad, and became the 6th South African (and 102nd Test player) to score a century on debut coincidentally at Centurion Park, which was a historical moment, during the first day of the fourth Test against England.

Cook was the first South African to face the pink ball as well as the first ever delivery in a day-night Test match and coincidentally his father Jimmy Cook was also the first ever South African to have faced the white ball in an ODI.

Cook is the first ever batsman to score a test century in the 3rd innings of a Day/Night test match, when he scored 104 in that innings. His 104 is still the highest individual score for any batsman in the 3rd innings of a day-night test match.

== See also ==
- List of centuries scored on Test cricket debut
