= Lundi Mbane =

South African cricketer (born 1982)

Personal information
- Born: 10 October 1982 (age 44); Mdantsane, South Africa
- Source: Cricinfo, 1 September 2015

Lundi Mbane (born 10 October 1982) is a South African cricketer. He was included in the Border cricket team squad for the 2015 Africa T20 Cup.
