= Tumi Masekela =

South African cricketer (born 1987)

Personal information
- Full name: Lerutla Matheko Gershon Masekela
- Born: 21 July 1987 (age 39); Pietersburg, South Africa
- Source: Cricinfo, 5 November 2015

Tumi Masekela (born 21 July 1987) is a South African first-class cricketer who plays for the Knights cricket team.
