= David White (South African cricketer) =

South African cricketer (born 1991)

Personal information
- Full name: David John White
- Born: 22 May 1991 (age 35); Durban, South Africa
- Batting: Right-handed
- Bowling: Right-arm medium-fast
- Role: All-rounder
- Relatives: Keith Johnson (grandfather)

Domestic team information
- Years: Team
- 2010/11–2017/18: Eastern Province
- 2011/12–2017/18: Warriors
- Source: Cricinfo, 26 April 2016

David White (born 22 May 1991) is a South African cricketer who played for the Warriors cricket team. In early 2021, White moved to San Francisco with the aim of playing cricket in the United States. In June 2021, White was selected in the players' draft ahead of the Minor League Cricket tournament.
