= Sammy Mofokeng =

South African cricketer (born 1991)

Sammy Mofokeng (born 5 August 1991) is a South African cricketer. He is a right-handed batsman and right-arm medium-fast bowler who plays for Northerns. He was born in Free State.

Mofokeng made his cricketing debut during the 2008–09 CSA Under-19 Competition, playing two matches in the competition in spite of making a golden duck in his first innings. He made his first-class debut during the 2009–10 season, against Border, scoring 6 not out in his debut innings.

In September 2018, he was named in Northerns' squad for the 2018 Africa T20 Cup.
