= Michael Price (cricketer) =

South African cricketer (born 1981)

Personal information
- Born: 6 October 1981 (age 45); Grahamstown, South Africa
- Source: Cricinfo, 7 November 2015

Michael Price (born 6 October 1981) is a South African former first-class cricketer who played for the Warriors cricket team.
