= Omphile Ramela =

South African cricketer (born 1988)

Personal information
- Full name: Omphile Abel Ramela
- Born: 14 March 1988 (age 38); Soweto, Transvaal Province, South Africa
- Batting: Left-handed
- Bowling: Slow left orthodox

Domestic team information
- Years: Team
- 2007–2008: Gauteng
- 2008–present: Boland
- 2009–2010: Cape Cobras
- First-class debut: 11 October 2007 Gauteng v Zimbabwe Provinces
- List A debut: 14 October 2007 Gauteng v Zimbabwe Provinces

Career statistics
Competition	First-class	List A
Matches	123	88
Runs scored	5885	2189
Batting average	29.13	27.02
100s/50s	9/26	1/15
Top score	202 no	106
Balls bowled	648	120
Wickets	12	0
Bowling average	36.16	-
5 wickets in innings	0	0
10 wickets in match	0	0
Best bowling	4-39	0–13
Catches/stumpings	69/–	19/–
- Source: CricketArchive, 21 November 2022

Omphile Abel Ramela (born 14 March 1988) is a South African cricketer. A left-handed batsman and left-arm orthodox spin bowler, he made his first-class debut for Gauteng in December 2007 before joining Boland the following month. He also represented the Cape Cobras on several occasions between 2009 and 2010. The 2014–15 season was his breakthrough year. He finished as the Cobras' top run-scorer in the first-class competition with 724 runs at 48.26, which included a double hundred. He was included in the Western Province cricket team squad for the 2015 Africa T20 Cup.

In September 2017, he played his 100th first-class match, when he played for Highveld Lions against Warriors in the 2017–18 Sunfoil Series. In June 2018, he was named in the squad for the Highveld Lions team for the 2018–19 season.
