= Shaylen Pillay =

South African cricketer (born 1994)

Personal information
- Born: 12 April 1994 (age 32); Johannesburg, South Africa
- Source: Cricinfo, 7 November 2015

Shaylen Pillay (born 12 April 1994) is a South African cricketer who played for the Highveld Lions cricket team. In September 2019, he was named in Gauteng's squad for the 2019–20 CSA Provincial T20 Cup. In April 2021, he was named in North West's squad, ahead of the 2021–22 cricket season in South Africa.
