= Qaasim Adams =

South African cricketer

Personal information
- Born: 29 April 1984 (age 42); Cape Town, South Africa
- Source: Cricinfo, 1 September 2015

Qaasim Adams (born 29 April 1984) is a South African cricketer. He was included in the Northerns cricket team squad for the 2015 Africa T20 Cup. In August 2017, he was named in Durban Qalandars' squad for the first season of the T20 Global League. However, in October 2017, Cricket South Africa initially postponed the tournament until November 2018, with it being cancelled soon after.

He was the leading run-scorer in the 2017–18 CSA Provincial One-Day Challenge tournament for Western Province, with 315 runs in seven matches. In September 2018, he was named in Western Province's squad for the 2018 Africa T20 Cup.

He was initially banned after pulling a gun on his teammate in November 2018, but later cleared to play. However, in January 2019, he was banned for twelve playing days by the Western Province Cricket Association over the incident.

In September 2019, he was named in Western Province's squad for the 2019–20 CSA Provincial T20 Cup.
