= Dominic Hendricks =

South African cricketer

Personal information
- Full name: Dominic Andrew Hendricks
- Born: 7 November 1990 (age 35); Port Elizabeth, Cape Province, South Africa
- Batting: Left-handed
- Bowling: Right-arm off break
- Role: Batsman
- Source: CricketArchive, 30 January 2010

Dominic Andrew Hendricks (born 7 November 1990) is a South African cricketer who played for Gauteng. A left-handed batsman, Hendricks has also represented South Africa U19. Hendricks made his List A debut for Gauteng on his 19th birthday, making a half century at quicker than a run a ball. His first appearance for South Africa U19 came just over a month later, as he opened the batting against Sri Lanka U19 in the South Africa Tri-Nation U-19 tournament. He scored 66 of an opening partnership of 119 that helped set up a South African victory. South Africa took the same squad to the 2010 U-19 Cricket World Cup in New Zealand. Hendricks scored a century and three fifties during the tournament to finish as the leading run-scorer in the competition. He was included in the Gauteng cricket team for the 2015 Africa T20 Cup.

He was included in several squads: in June 2018, he was named in the Highveld Lions squad for the 2018–19 season; in September 2019, he was included in the Gauteng squad for the 2019–20 CSA Provincial T20 Cup; and in April 2021, he was included in the Gauteng squad for the 2021–22 cricket season in South Africa.
