= Andrew Birch (cricketer) =

South African cricketer (born 1985)

Personal information
- Full name: Andrew Charles Ross Birch
- Born: 7 June 1985 (age 41); East London, Eastern Cape, South Africa
- Nickname: Steaks
- Batting: Right-handed
- Bowling: Right-arm medium-fast
- Role: Bowler

Domestic team information
- Years: Team
- 2005–2011: Eastern Province
- 2007–present: Warriors
- 2019–2020: Dhaka Dynamites

Career statistics
| Competition | FC | LA | T20 |
|---|---|---|---|
| Matches | 88 | 68 | 56 |
| Runs scored | 1,952 | 479 | 144 |
| Batting average | 16.68 | 14.51 | 9.00 |
| 100s/50s | 0/6 | 0/1 | 0/0 |
| Top score | 88 | 55* | 30 |
| Balls bowled | 15,307 | 3,046 | 1,102 |
| Wickets | 304 | 113 | 66 |
| Bowling average | 24.99 | 21.38 | 20.51 |
| 5 wickets in innings | 11 | 0 | 1 |
| 10 wickets in match | 0 | 0 | 0 |
| Best bowling | 8/30 | 4/15 | 5/16 |
| Catches/stumpings | 34/– | 11/– | 12/– |
- Source: Cricinfo, 12 November 2016

Andrew Charles Ross Birch (born 7 June 1985) is a South African cricketer who plays for the Warriors cricket team.

== Early life ==
Birch hails from the small Eastern Cape town of Dordrecht. He was educated at St Andrew's College in Grahamstown, before further his studies at the Nelson Mandela Metropolitan University (NMMU) in Port Elizabeth. His grandfather Ernest Birch played first-class cricket for Border in the 1940s and his elder brother Colin Birch played for Western Province.

== Playing career ==
Birch represented South Africa at the 2004 Under-19 Cricket World Cup in Bangladesh. He also represented the South African Students team whilst at NMMU. He made his first-class debut for Eastern Province in January 2005 against Griqualand West in the UCB Provincial Cup.

A bowling all-rounder, Birch graduated through the Eastern Province ranks to become the leader of the Warriors franchise attack, finishing as the Warriors leading wicket-taker in the 2012/13 and 2014/15 Sunfoil Series. He was also the Warriors leading wicket-taker in the Momentum One Day Cup in the 2012/13, 2013/14 and 2015/16 seasons, finishing as the competitions overall leading wicket taker in the 2012/13 season.

During his first innings haul of 4/57 against the Lions at the Wanderers in their fifth round Sunfoil Series clash of the 2016/217 season, Birch claimed his 300th first-class wicket when he had Mangaliso Mosehle caught at second slip by Simon Harmer.

The Warriors finished as runners-up in the 2016–2017 CSA T20 Challenge, losing to the Titans in the final. Birch's 17 wickets from nine matches placed him second on the overall leading wicket-takers table, with his 5 for 16 against the Titans on 2 December 2016 being both a personal career best as well as the single best figures in the competition.

Birch has also played for the South African 'A' side. In August 2017, he was named in Nelson Mandela Bay Stars' squad for the first season of the T20 Global League. However, in October 2017, Cricket South Africa initially postponed the tournament until November 2018, with it being cancelled soon after.

In October 2018, he was named in Tshwane Spartans' squad for the first edition of the Mzansi Super League T20 tournament. Later the same month, he was named in the squad for the Dhaka Dynamites team, following the draft for the 2018–19 Bangladesh Premier League.
