= Morné van Wyk =

South African cricketer

Personal information
- Full name: Morné Nico van Wyk
- Born: 20 March 1979 (age 47); Bloemfontein, Orange Free State Province, South Africa
- Batting: Right-handed
- Bowling: Slow left-arm orthodox
- Role: Wicket-keeper, Opening Batsman

International information
- National side: South Africa (2003–2015)
- ODI debut (cap 75): 12 July 2003 v England
- Last ODI: 26 August 2015 v New Zealand
- ODI shirt no.: 15 (formerly 44)
- T20I debut (cap 27): 2 February 2007 v Pakistan
- Last T20I: 16 August 2015 v New Zealand
- T20I shirt no.: 15 (formerly 44)

Domestic team information
- Years: Team
- 1996/97–2009/10: Free State
- 2003/04–2012/13: Eagles/Knights
- 2009: Kolkata Knight Riders
- 2013/14; 2018/19: KwaZulu-Natal
- 2013/14–2018/19: Dolphins
- 2016/17: KwaZulu-Natal Inland
- 2016/17: Quetta Gladiators
- 2017/18: Boost Defenders
- 2018/19: Durban Heat

Career statistics
Competition	ODI	T20I	FC	LA
Matches	17	8	163	263
Runs scored	425	225	9,007	9,047
Batting average	26.56	37.50	37.84	39.33
100s/50s	0/4	1/1	21/44	24/43
Top score	82	114*	200*	175*
Balls bowled	–	–	78	129
Wickets	–	–	2	7
Bowling average	–	–	18.00	16.42
5 wickets in innings	–	–	0	0
10 wickets in match	–	–	0	0
Best bowling	–	–	2/25	2/28
Catches/stumpings	10/1	5/–	417/17	231/26
- Source: CricketArchive, 15 July 2025

Morné Nico van Wyk (born 20 March 1979) is a South African professional cricketer who has played in 17 One Day Internationals for South Africa. He is also the brother of fellow cricketer Divan van Wyk.

== Domestic career ==
In October 2018, he was named in Durban Heat's squad for the first edition of the Mzansi Super League T20 tournament.

Morne van Wyk along with Cameron Delport set the record for the highest opening stand in List A matches with an unbeaten 367 in the South African Domestic League matches in 2014. He also represented the Kolkata Knight Riders in the Indian Premier League scoring 167 runs from the 5 matches he played with a highest score of 74.

== International career ==
He has also functioned as a wicket-keeper. He made his ODI debut at Lord's in 2003, scoring 17 in a very low scoring game. In January 2011 in a Twenty20 International match against India, Morné scored the quickest half-century ever by a South African. It came off only 24 balls.

During the 2014–15 West Indian tour of South Africa, van Wyk scored a Twenty20 International century in the third T20I of the series, and by doing so became the third South African to score a T20I century.
