= Rowan Richards =

South African cricketer (born 1984)

Personal information
- Full name: Rowan Richards
- Born: 8 July 1984 (age 42); East London, South Africa
- Batting: Left-handed
- Bowling: Left-arm fast-medium
- Source: Cricinfo, 1 September 2015

Rowan Richards (born 8 July 1984) is a South African cricketer. He was included in the Northerns cricket team squad for the 2015 Africa T20 Cup. In August 2017, he was named in Stellenbosch Monarchs' squad for the first season of the T20 Global League. However, in October 2017, Cricket South Africa initially postponed the tournament until November 2018, with it being cancelled soon after. Richards has continued his career in the sports industry and is currently a Professional Coach at Queen's College Boys' High School
