= Craig Alexander (cricketer) =

South African cricketer (born 1987)

Craig John Alexander (born 5 January 1987 in Cape Town) is a cricketer. He played in the 2004 and 2006 Under-19 Cricket World Cups and plays first-class cricket for Dolphins. Alexander previously played 5 seasons for Lions but moved to the Dolphins in 2012. He bowls right-arm fast and bats in the lower order. He was included in the KZN Inland squad for the 2015 Africa T20 Cup. In August 2017, he was named in Stellenbosch Monarchs' squad for the first season of the T20 Global League. However, in October 2017, Cricket South Africa initially postponed the tournament until November 2018, with it being cancelled soon after.

In June 2018, he was named in the squad for the Highveld Lions team for the 2018–19 season. In September 2019, he was named in Boland's squad for the 2019–20 CSA Provincial T20 Cup.
