= Pumelela Matshikwe =

South African cricketer (born 1984)

Personal information
- Born: 19 June 1984 (age 42); Johannesburg, South Africa
- Source: Cricinfo, 7 November 2015

Pumelela Matshikwe (born 19 June 1984) is a South African former first-class cricketer who played for the Highveld Lions cricket team.

== Match fixing ban and jail ==
In August 2016, he was given a ten-year ban by Cricket South Africa for his involvement in match fixing during the 2015–16 Ram Slam T20 Challenge tournament. In June 2022, he was given a six-year jail sentence, which was suspended for five years, for his part in the match fixing.
