= Christiaan Jonker =

South African cricketer (born 1986)

Personal information
- Born: 24 September 1986 (age 40); Rustenburg, Transvaal Province, South Africa
- Batting: Right-handed
- Role: Batter

International information
- National side: South Africa
- ODI debut (cap 129): 30 September 2018 v Zimbabwe
- Last ODI: 3 October 2018 v Zimbabwe
- T20I debut (cap 76): 24 February 2018 v India
- Last T20I: 9 October 2018 v Zimbabwe

Career statistics
Competition	ODI	T20I	FC	LA
Matches	2	2	73	111
Runs scored	31	57	4,250	3,056
Batting average	15.50	48.50	37.94	35.53
100s/50s	0/0	0/0	11/24	4/20
Top score	25	49	201*	115*
Balls bowled	–	–	1,398	524
Wickets	–	–	33	13
Bowling average	–	–	24.63	35.44
5 wickets in innings	–	–	0	0
10 wickets in match	–	–	0	0
Best bowling	–	–	4/35	3/13
Catches/stumpings	0/–	1/–	40/–	32/–
- Source: Cricinfo, 5 July 2023

Christiaan Jonker (born 24 September 1986) is a South African cricketer who represents the South Africa national cricket team. He was included in the Border cricket team for the 2015 Africa T20 Cup.

== Domestic and T20 franchise career ==
In August 2017, he was named in Jo'burg Giants' squad for the first season of the T20 Global League. However, in October 2017, Cricket South Africa initially postponed the tournament until November 2018, with it being cancelled soon after.

On 3 June 2018, he was selected to play for the Edmonton Royals in the players' draft for the inaugural edition of the Global T20 Canada tournament.

In August 2018, he was named in Border's squad for the 2018 Africa T20 Cup. In October 2018, he was named in Nelson Mandela Bay Giants' squad for the first edition of the Mzansi Super League T20 tournament. Later the same month, he was named in the squad for the Rajshahi Kings team, following the draft for the 2018–19 Bangladesh Premier League. In April 2021, he was named in Boland's squad, ahead of the 2021–22 cricket season in South Africa.

== International career ==
In February 2018, he was named in South Africa's Twenty20 International (T20I) squad for their series against India. He made his T20I debut for South Africa against India on 24 February 2018. In September 2018, he was named in South Africa's One Day International (ODI) series against Zimbabwe. He made his ODI debut for South Africa against Zimbabwe on 30 September 2018.
