= Tumelo Bodibe =

South African cricketer (born 1987)

Personal information
- Born: 22 November 1987 (age 38); Gauteng, South Africa
- Source: Cricinfo, 4 September 2015

Tumelo Bodibe (born 22 November 1987) is a South African cricketer. He was included in the Griqualand West cricket team squad for the 2015 Africa T20 Cup.
