= Graeme van Buuren =

South African cricketer (born 1990)

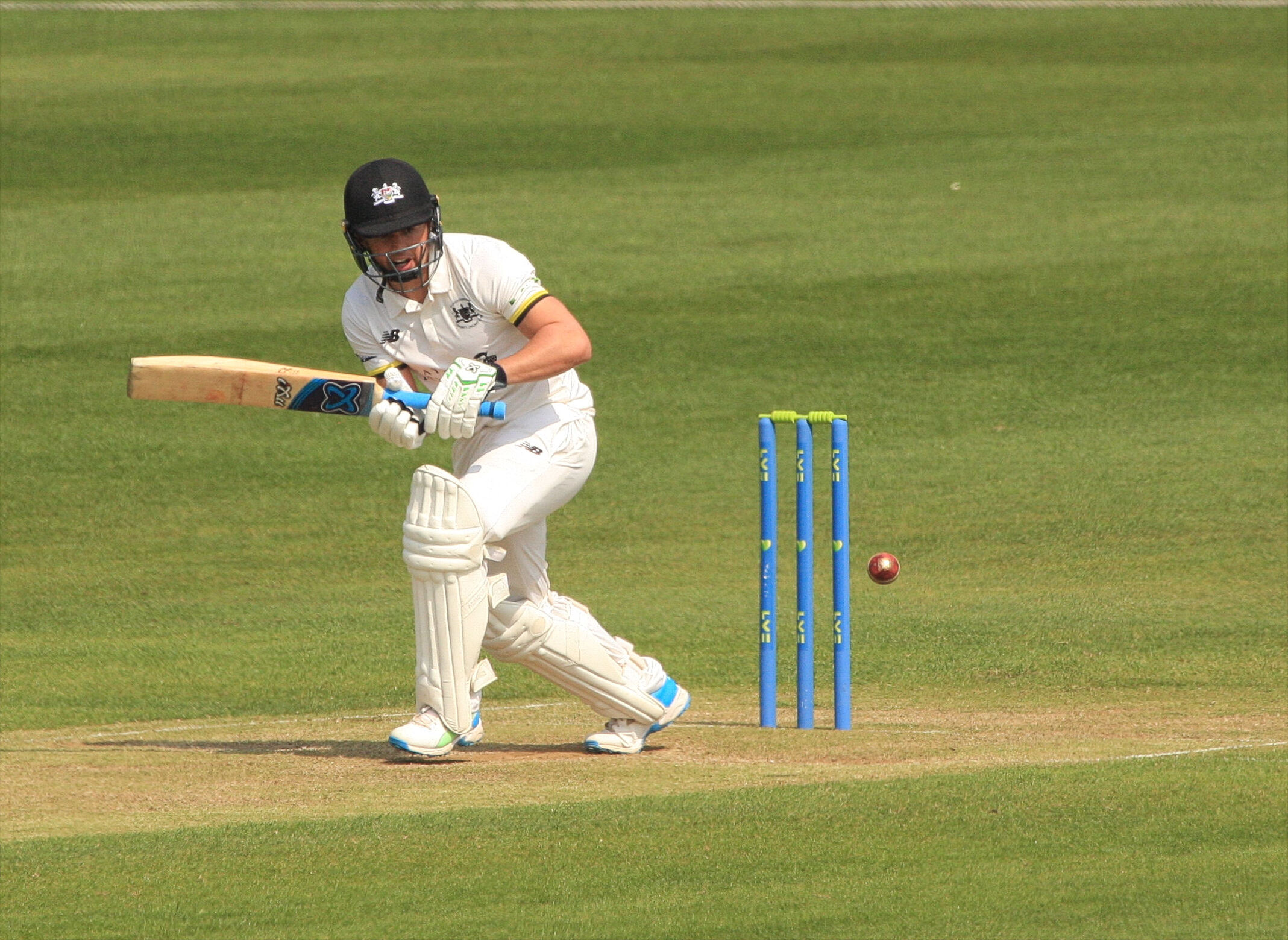
- van Buuren in 2022

Personal information
- Full name: Graeme Lourens van Buuren
- Born: 22 August 1990 (age 36); Pretoria, Transvaal Province, South Africa
- Batting: Right-handed
- Bowling: Slow left-arm orthodox
- Role: All-rounder

Domestic team information
- Years: Team
- 2010–2016: Northerns
- 2010–2016: Titans
- 2016–present: Gloucestershire (squad no. 12)
- 2022: Birmingham Phoenix (squad no. 2)
- First-class debut: 4 March 2010 Northerns v Griqualand West
- List A debut: 17 January 2010 Titans v Dolphins

Career statistics
Competition	FC	LA	T20
Matches	151	107	104
Runs scored	7,989	2,294	1,146
Batting average	38.59	29.79	22.92
100s/50s	17/44	2/10	0/4
Top score	235	119*	64
Balls bowled	10,734	3,710	1,412
Wickets	151	93	61
Bowling average	35.43	32.46	28.04
5 wickets in innings	0	1	1
10 wickets in match	0	0	0
Best bowling	4/12	5/35	5/8
Catches/stumpings	74/–	35/–	42/–
- Source: CricInfo, 11 August 2026

Graeme Lourens van Buuren (born 22 August 1990) is a South African-born English cricketer who plays for Gloucestershire. In March 2022, he was appointed the captain of the team for first-class and List A matches and held the position until standing down in January 2025. Van Buuren initially qualified to play in English county cricket due to his British spouse, but was granted British citizenship in December 2021.

In April 2022, he was bought by the Birmingham Phoenix for the 2022 season of The Hundred.
