= Divan van Wyk =

South African cricketer (born 1985)

Personal information
- Born: 25 February 1985 (age 41); Bloemfontein, South Africa
- Source: Cricinfo, 5 November 2015

Divan van Wyk (born 25 February 1985) is a South African first-class cricketer who plays for the Dolphins cricket team. He made his first-class debut for KwaZulu-Natal against Free State at Durban in October 2004.
