= Heino Kuhn =

South African cricketer (born 1984)

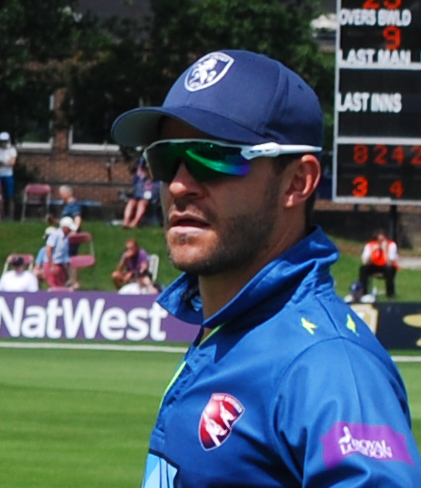
- Kuhn fielding for Kent at Beckenham in June 2018

Personal information
- Full name: Heino Gunther Kuhn
- Born: 1 April 1984 (age 42); Piet Retief, Transvaal Province
- Batting: Right-handed
- Role: Wicket-keeper batsman

International information
- National side: South Africa (2009–2017)
- Test debut (cap 331): 6 July 2017 v England
- Last Test: 4 August 2017 v England
- T20I debut (cap 43): 15 November 2009 v England
- Last T20I: 22 January 2017 v Sri Lanka
- T20I shirt no.: 20

Domestic team information
- Years: Team
- 2004/05–2015/16: Northerns
- 2005/06–2019/20: Titans
- 2018–2021: Kent (squad no. 4)
- 2018–2019: Nelson Mandela Bay Giants
- 2018/19: Dhaka Dynamites
- 2021/22–2022/23: North West

Career statistics
Competition	Test	T20I	FC	LA
Matches	4	7	189	187
Runs scored	113	49	11,838	5,182
Batting average	14.12	12.25	38.94	34.09
100s/50s	0/0	0/0	25/58	13/24
Top score	34	29	244*	141*
Catches/stumpings	1/–	5/0	382/18	193/22
- Source: CricInfo, 10 April 2023

Heino Gunther Kuhn (born 1 April 1984) is a South African cricketer who has played for the national team. He has played for Titans and Northerns in South African domestic cricket and in March 2018 signed a Kolpak contract with Kent County Cricket Club to play in English county cricket. He left Kent in 2021 and returned to South Africa to play for North West.

== Domestic career ==
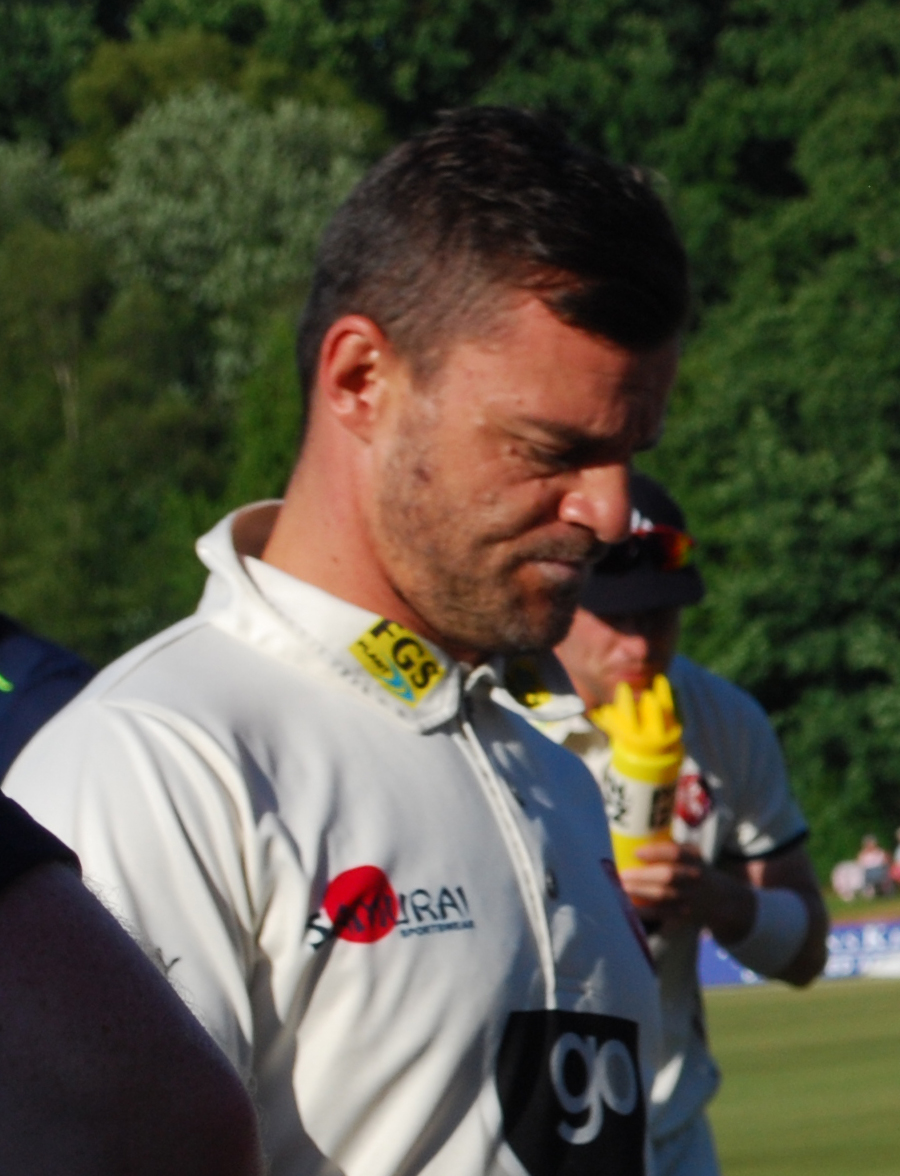
Kuhn at Tunbridge Wells, June 2018

A wicket-keeper batsman, Kuhn was the second highest run scorer in the 2006–07 SuperSport Series with 776 runs at an average of 48.50. This tally included an innings of 216 against the Dolphins at Pietermaritzburg.

In the 2015–16 Sunfoil Series, he became the sixth South African player to score 1,000 runs in a single first-class season. In July 2016 Cricket South Africa named him as the first-class cricketer of the season and the domestic players' player of the season.

In August 2017, he was named in Nelson Mandela Bay Stars' squad for the first season of the T20 Global League. However, in October 2017, Cricket South Africa initially postponed the tournament until November 2018, with it being cancelled soon after.

In March 2018, Kuhn signed a Kolpak contract with Kent County Cricket Club to play in English county cricket, subject initially to him obtaining a visa. In June 2018, he was named in the squad for the Titans team for the 2018–19 season. In September 2018, he was named in the Titans' squad for the 2018 Abu Dhabi T20 Trophy.

In October 2018, he was named in Nelson Mandela Bay Giants' squad for the first edition of the Mzansi Super League T20 tournament. In September 2019, he was named in the squad for the Nelson Mandela Bay Giants team for the 2019 Mzansi Super League tournament. In April 2021, he was named in North West's squad, ahead of the 2021–22 cricket season in South Africa.

== International career ==
He made his international debut in a Twenty20 International (T20I) against England at his home ground of Supersport Park, Pretoria, on 15 November 2009.

In June 2017, he was named in South Africa's Test squad for their series against England. He made his Test debut for South Africa against England on 6 July 2017.

== See also ==
- List of Kolpak cricketers
