= Ayabulela Gqamane =

South African cricketer (born 1989)

Personal information
- Full name: Ayabulela Gqamane
- Born: 30 August 1989 (age 37); King William's Town, Cape Province, South Africa
- Batting: Right-handed
- Bowling: Right-arm fast-medium
- Role: All-rounder

Domestic team information
- Years: Team
- 2009/10–2019/20: Border
- 2012/13–2020/21: Warriors
- 2019: Cape Town Blitz
- 2021/22–present: Northerns
- 2023: Sunrisers Eastern Cape

Career statistics
Competition	FC	LA	T20
Matches	76	90	78
Runs scored	1,857	967	459
Batting average	20.63	24.17	13.90
100s/50s	2/4	0/3	0/0
Top score	117*	88*	42
Balls bowled	8,468	3,111	992
Wickets	202	101	41
Bowling average	23.41	28.44	36.00
5 wickets in innings	9	2	0
10 wickets in match	3	0	0
Best bowling	8/25	5/28	3/20
Catches/stumpings	30/–	33/–	26/–
- Source: ESPNcricinfo, 19 January 2023

Ayabulela Gqamane (born 30 August 1989) is a South African cricketer. He was included in the Border cricket team for the 2015 Africa T20 Cup. In August 2018, he was named in the Border squad for the 2018 Africa T20 Cup. In April 2021, he was named in Northerns' squad, ahead of the 2021–22 cricket season in South Africa.
