= Diego Rosier =

South African cricketer (born 1994)

Personal information
- Born: 2 May 1994 (age 32); Kimberley, South Africa
- Source: Cricinfo, 4 September 2015

Diego Rosier (born 2 May 1994) is a South African first-class cricketer. He was included in the Griqualand West cricket team squad for the 2015 Africa T20 Cup. In August 2017, he was named in Pretoria Mavericks' squad for the first season of the T20 Global League. However, in October 2017, Cricket South Africa initially postponed the tournament until November 2018, with it being cancelled soon after.

In September 2018, he was named in Northerns' squad for the 2018 Africa T20 Cup. In April 2021, he was named in Eastern Province's squad, ahead of the 2021–22 cricket season in South Africa.
