= Aaron Phangiso =

South African cricketer

Personal information
- Full name: Aaron Mpho Phangiso
- Born: 21 January 1984 (age 42); Ga-Rankuwa, Transvaal Province, South Africa
- Batting: Right-handed
- Bowling: Left arm orthodox
- Role: Bowler

International information
- National side: South Africa (2012–2018)
- ODI debut (cap 108): 25 January 2013 v New Zealand
- Last ODI: 9 October 2016 v Australia
- ODI shirt no.: 69
- T20I debut (cap 56): 23 December 2012 v New Zealand
- Last T20I: 24 February 2018 v India
- T20I shirt no.: 69

Domestic team information
- Years: Team
- 2004/05–present: Northerns
- 2005/06–2007/08: Titans
- 2008/09–2020/21: Lions
- 2008/09–2018/19: Gauteng
- 2011/12–2019/20: North West
- 2018: Nelson Mandela Bay Giants
- 2019: Jozi Stars
- 2023: Joburg Super Kings

Career statistics
Competition	ODI	T20I	FC	LA
Matches	21	16	86	202
Runs scored	81	19	1,833	992
Batting average	7.36	6.33	20.82	11.02
100s/50s	0/0	0/0	0/8	0/2
Top score	20	13	77	68
Balls bowled	1,085	342	11,356	8,874
Wickets	26	20	166	214
Bowling average	31.88	22.15	35.81	32.37
5 wickets in innings	0	0	4	0
10 wickets in match	0	0	0	0
Best bowling	3/40	3/25	6/77	4/30
Catches/stumpings	4/–	0/–	60/1	60/–
- Source: ESPNcricinfo, 29 December 2022

Aaron Mpho Phangiso (born 21 January 1984) is an international South African cricketer who domestically plays for Northerns. He is a slow left arm orthodox bowler.

== Domestic career ==
In August 2017, Phangiso was named in Bloem City Blazers' squad for the first season of the T20 Global League. However, in October 2017, Cricket South Africa initially postponed the tournament until November 2018, with it being cancelled soon after.

In June 2018, Phangiso was named in the squad for the Highveld Lions team for the 2018–19 season. In October 2018, he was named in Nelson Mandela Bay Giants' squad for the first edition of the Mzansi Super League T20 tournament. In September 2019, he was named in the squad for the Jozi Stars team for the 2019 Mzansi Super League tournament. In April 2021, he was named in Northerns' squad, ahead of the 2021–22 cricket season in South Africa.

== International career ==
Phangiso made his international debut for South Africa on 23 December 2012 in a Twenty20 match against New Zealand. He bowled four overs (24 deliveries) and conceded 42 runs. He was included in the North West cricket team squad for the 2015 Africa T20 Cup.
