= Eddie Leie =

South African cricketer (born 1986)

Personal information
- Born: 16 November 1986 (age 39); Potchefstroom, Transvaal Province, South Africa
- Batting: Right-handed
- Bowling: Right-arm leg break
- Role: Bowler

International information
- National side: South Africa
- T20I debut: 7 July 2015 v Bangladesh
- Last T20I: 16 August 2015 v New Zealand

Domestic team information
- Years: Team
- 2004/05–2016/17: Gauteng
- 2011/12–2016/17: Lions
- 2015, 2017: St Lucia Stars
- 2016/17: Cape Cobras
- 2017/18–2018/19: Knights
- 2017/18–2018/19: Free State
- 2018: Jozi Stars
- 2019/20: Central Gauteng

Career statistics
Competition	T20I	FC	LA	T20
Matches	2	72	81	77
Runs scored	–	564	194	32
Batting average	–	11.05	9.70	4.57
100s/50s	–	0/1	0/0	0/0
Top score	–	58	18	10*
Balls bowled	36	10,674	3,319	1,482
Wickets	4	227	99	73
Bowling average	12.00	29.63	29.92	24.84
5 wickets in innings	0	11	1	1
10 wickets in match	0	1	0	0
Best bowling	3/16	6/50	5/30	5/15
Catches/stumpings	0/–	20/–	11/–	14/–
- Source: ESPNcricinfo, 26 December 2022

Eddie Leie (born 16 November 1986) is a South African former cricketer who played as a leg break bowler and right-handed batter. He has played for the South Africa A cricket team and was awarded a High Performance contract by Cricket South Africa in 2015. In August 2017, he was named in Benoni Zalmi's squad for the first season of the T20 Global League. However, in October 2017, Cricket South Africa initially postponed the tournament until November 2018, with it being cancelled soon after.

In September 2018, he was named in Free State's squad for the 2018 Africa T20 Cup. The following month, he was named in Jozi Stars' squad for the first edition of the Mzansi Super League T20 tournament. In September 2019, he was named in Gauteng's squad for the 2019–20 CSA Provincial T20 Cup.

== International career ==
He made his Twenty20 International debut against Bangladesh on 7 July 2015. He took 3 wickets for 16 runs in the debut match and won the man of the match award.
