= Theunis de Bruyn =

South African cricketer (born 1992)

Personal information
- Full name: Theunis Booysen de Bruyn
- Born: 8 October 1992 (age 34); Pretoria, Transvaal, South Africa
- Batting: Right-handed
- Bowling: Right-arm medium-fast
- Role: Middle-order batter

International information
- National side: South Africa (2017–2022)
- Test debut (cap 330): 25 March 2017 v New Zealand
- Last Test: 26 December 2022 v Australia
- T20I debut (cap 65): 20 January 2017 v Sri Lanka
- Last T20I: 22 January 2017 v Sri Lanka

Domestic team information
- Years: Team
- 2013/14–2015/16: Titans
- 2013/14–2015/16: Northerns
- 2015/16–2017/18: Knights
- 2018: Surrey
- 2018/19–2020/21: Titans
- 2018–2019: Tshwane Spartans
- 2021/22–present: Northerns
- 2023-present: Pretoria Capitals

Career statistics
Competition	Test	T20I	FC	LA
Matches	12	2	77	54
Runs scored	428	26	5,027	1,877
Batting average	19.45	13.00	41.54	42.65
100s/50s	1/0	0/0	14/20	5/8
Top score	101	19	202*	183
Balls bowled	102	–	786	162
Wickets	0	–	11	3
Bowling average	–	–	40.45	43.66
5 wickets in innings	0	–	0	0
10 wickets in match	0	–	0	0
Best bowling	–	–	2/24	2/37
Catches/stumpings	11/–	2/–	76/–	20/–
- Source: ESPNcricinfo, 26 December 2022

Theunis Booysen de Bruyn (born 8 October 1992) is a former South African cricketer who represents Northerns. He is a right-handed batsman who bowls occasional right-arm medium-fast.

== Domestic career ==
On 19 January 2015, de Bruyn became the third quickest South African batsman to reach 1,000 first-class runs, doing so in 20 innings. He was included in the Northerns cricket team squad for the 2015 Africa T20 Cup.

In August 2017, de Bruyn was named in Bloem City Blazers' squad for the first season of the T20 Global League. However, in October 2017, Cricket South Africa initially postponed the tournament until November 2018, with it being cancelled soon after.

In June 2018, de Bruyn was named in the squad for the Titans team for the 2018–19 season. In September 2018, he was named in the Titans' squad for the 2018 Abu Dhabi T20 Trophy. In October 2018, during the 2018–19 CSA 4-Day Franchise Series tournament, de Bruyn scored his 4,000th run in first-class cricket.

In October 2018, de Bruyn was named in Tshwane Spartans' squad for the first edition of the Mzansi Super League T20 tournament. He was the joint-leading run-scorer in the 2018–19 CSA T20 Challenge tournament, with 348 runs in seven matches.

In September 2019, de Bruyn was named in the squad for the Tshwane Spartans team for the 2019 Mzansi Super League tournament. In April 2021, he was named in Northerns' squad, ahead of the 2021–22 cricket season in South Africa.

== International career ==
In December 2016 de Bruyn was added to South Africa's Test squad for their series against Sri Lanka. He made his Twenty20 International (T20I) debut for South Africa against Sri Lanka on 20 January 2017. He made his Test debut for South Africa against New Zealand on 25 March 2017.

De Bruyn was included in South Africa's squad for their Test match series in England which began in July 2017. He played the first match of the series, scoring 49 runs in the match with a top score of 48 in the first innings as South Africa lost the match by 211 runs. He was dropped for the following Test. He was recalled to replace Vernon Philander, who suffered back spasm in the buildup to the final Test. In July 2018, in the second Test against Sri Lanka, he scored his first century in Tests, his 101 equalling the record of Jonty Rhodes' 101* as the highest 4th innings score by a South African in Asia.

In March 2019, de Bruyn was awarded a contract by Cricket South Africa for the 2019–2020 season and was one on 16 players to be given a contract.

In October 2019, during the third Test of the series against India, de Bruyn replaced Dean Elgar as a concussion substitute in South Africa's squad.
