= Ethy Mbhalati =

South African cricketer (born 1981)

Personal information
- Full name: Nkateko Ethy Mbhalati
- Born: 18 November 1981 (age 44); Phalaborwa, Limpopo, South Africa
- Source: Cricinfo, 1 September 2015

Ethy Mbhalati (born 18 November 1981) is a South African former first-class cricketer. He was included in the Easterns cricket team squad for the 2015 Africa T20 Cup. In August 2016, he was given a ten-year ban by Cricket South Africa for his involvement in match fixing during the 2015–16 Ram Slam T20 Challenge tournament.
