= Basheeru-Deen Walters =

South African cricketer (born 1986)

Personal information
- Born: 16 September 1986 (age 40); Port Elizabeth, South Africa
- Source: Cricinfo, 3 September 2015

Basheeru-Deen Walters (born 16 September 1986) is a South African cricketer. He was included in the Eastern Province cricket team squad for the 2015 Africa T20 Cup. In August 2017, he was named in Pretoria Mavericks' squad for the first season of the T20 Global League. However, in October 2017, Cricket South Africa initially postponed the tournament until November 2018, with it being cancelled soon after.

In August 2018, he was named in Border's squad for the 2018 Africa T20 Cup. In September 2019, he was named in Eastern Province's squad for the 2019–20 CSA Provincial T20 Cup. He was the joint-leading wicket-taker in the 2019–20 CSA Provincial One-Day Challenge, with sixteen dismissals in seven matches.

In April 2021, he was named in Western Province's squad, ahead of the 2021–22 cricket season in South Africa.
