= 2019–20 CSA 4-Day Franchise Series =

Cricket tournament

- Dates: 7 October 2019 – 8 April 2020
- Administrator: Cricket South Africa
- Cricket format: First-class
- Tournament format: Double round-robin
- Champions: Lions (3rd title)
- Participants: 6
- Matches: 30
- Most runs: Raynard van Tonder (843)
- Most wickets: Prenelan Subrayen (38)

The 2019–20 CSA 4-Day Franchise Series was a first-class cricket competition that took place in South Africa from October 2019 to April 2020. Lions were the defending champions.

On 16 March 2020, Cricket South Africa suspended all cricket in the country for 60 days due to the COVID-19 pandemic. On 24 March 2020, Lions were named as the winners of the tournament, following the recommendations of Graeme Smith, the acting Director of Cricket.

== Points table ==
Teams	Pld	W	L	D	A	Pts
Lions	8	4	3	1	0	121.62
Titans	8	2	1	5	0	113.16
Warriors	8	2	2	4	0	112.10
Knights	8	2	1	5	0	112.02
Dolphins	8	2	3	3	0	98.58
Cape Cobras	8	0	2	6	0	95.20

== Fixtures ==
=== Round 1 ===
7–10 October 2019
Scorecard

Knights	v	Warriors
299 (99.4 overs); Raynard van Tonder 52 (95); JJ Smuts 5/56 (30 overs)		196 (63.3 overs); Sinethemba Qeshile 73 (111); Shaun von Berg 4/78 (22 overs)
332/6d (88.5 overs); Pite van Biljon 95 (135); Lutho Sipamla 3/70 (16 overs)		180 (44.3 overs); Glenton Stuurman 45* (38); Gerald Coetzee 4/53 (15 overs)

Knights won by 255 runs
De Beers Diamond Oval, Kimberley
Umpires: Dennis Smith and Brad White
Player of the match: Shaun von Berg (Knights)

- Knights won the toss and elected to bat.
- Gerald Coetzee (Knights) made his first-class debut.

7–10 October 2019
Scorecard

Lions	v	Cape Cobras
215 (56.2 overs); Kagiso Rapulana 84* (130); George Linde 4/67 (18 overs)		129 (47.5 overs); Jason Smith 68* (151); Bjorn Fortuin 4/34 (18.5 overs)
119 (30.3 overs); Dwaine Pretorius 41 (37); George Linde 7/64 (14.3 overs)		194 (52.1 overs); Kyle Verreynne 50 (64); Malusi Siboto 5/15 (12.1 overs)

Lions won by 11 runs
Senwes Park, Potchefstroom
Umpires: Bongani Jele and Lubabalo Gcuma
Player of the match: Kagiso Rapulana (Lions)

- Lions won the toss and elected to bat.

7–10 October 2019
Scorecard

Titans	v	Dolphins
441 (126.4 overs); Farhaan Behardien 114 (178); Prenelan Subrayen 3/97 (29.4 overs)		385 (107.2 overs); Grant Roelofsen 69 (62); Marcello Piedt 4/61 (25.2 overs)
385 (53.2 overs); Neil Brand 77 (102); Okuhle Cele 2/45 (13 overs)		161 (60.3 overs); Jason Oakes 55 (126); Tshepo Moreki 4/32 (17 overs)

Titans won by 129 runs
Centurion Park, Centurion
Umpires: Adrian Holdstock and Stephen Harris
Player of the match: Neil Brand (Titans)

- Titans won the toss and elected to bat.
- Tshepo Moreki (Titans) took a hat-trick.

=== Round 2 ===
14–17 October 2019
Scorecard

Lions	v	Warriors
152 (47.5 overs); Rassie van der Dussen 68 (105); Lutho Sipamla 4/57 (10 overs)		206 (63.3 overs); JJ Smuts 61 (113); Wiaan Mulder 4/36 (14.3 overs)
217 (63.5 overs); Dwaine Pretorius 71 (102); Lutho Sipamla 4/53 (17 overs)		166/7 (69.4 overs); Matthew Breetzke 59 (187); Malusi Siboto 4/47 (14.3 overs)

Warriors won by 3 wickets
Buffalo Park, East London
Umpires: Adrian Holdstock and Lubabalo Gcuma
Player of the match: Onke Nyaku (Warriors)

- Lions won the toss and elected to bat.

14–17 October 2019
Scorecard

Dolphins	v	Knights
370 (108.3); Marques Ackerman 88 (96); Gerald Coetzee 4/61 (26 overs)		519/8d (145.3 overs); Pite van Biljon 218 (347); Prenelan Subrayen 5/124 (35.3 overs)
219/6 (77 overs); Cody Chetty 90* (201); Patrick Kruger 2/23 (9 overs)

Match drawn
Mangaung Oval, Bloemfontein
Umpires: Dennis Smith and Stephen Harris
Player of the match: Pite van Biljon (Knights)

- Dolphins won the toss and elected to bat.

14–17 October 2019
Scorecard

Cape Cobras	v	Titans
338 (101.3 overs); Kyle Verreynne 155 (207); Corbin Bosch 5/69 (21 overs)		472 (132 overs); Farhaan Behardien 140 (250); Dane Paterson 7/91 (33 overs)
348 (88.4 overs); Kyle Verreynne 115 (125); Tshepo Moreki 4/98 (21 overs)		89/6 (38.3 overs); Farhaan Behardien 29* (98); Dane Paterson 2/24 (11 overs)

Match drawn
Willowmoore Park, Benoni
Umpires: Shaun George and Brad White
Player of the match: Kyle Verreynne (Cape Cobras)

- Titans won the toss and elected to field.

=== Round 3 ===
21–24 October 2019
Scorecard

Warriors	v	Titans
364/9d (111.1 overs); Yaseen Vallie 137 (209); Dayyaan Galiem 4/83 (24.1 overs)		343 (109.4 overs); Grant Thomson 101 (193); JJ Smuts 4/66 (24.4 overs)
260 (81.2 overs); Matthew Breetzke 80 (171); Tabraiz Shamsi 5/66 (21.2 overs)		104/3 (46 overs); Grant Thomson 39* (124); Glenton Stuurman 2/25 (9 overs)

Match drawn
St George's Park Cricket Ground, Port Elizabeth
Umpires: John Dempsey and Marais Erasmus
Player of the match: Yaseen Vallie (Warriors)

- Warriors won the toss and elected to bat.

21–24 October 2019
Scorecard

Dolphins	v	Cape Cobras
325/9d (100 overs); Grant Roelofsen 133 (218); Dane Paterson 3/78 (21 overs)		491 (131.2 overs); Matthew Kleinveldt 175 (373); Smangaliso Nhlebela 4/109 (28 overs)
198/6 (41 overs); Cody Chetty 69* (203); Thando Ntini 2/45 (12 overs)

Match drawn
City Oval, Pietermaritzburg
Umpires: Bongani Jele and Philip Vosloo
Player of the match: Matthew Kleinveldt (Cape Cobras)

- Dolphins won the toss and elected to bat.

21–24 October 2019
Scorecard

Lions	v	Knights
468/4d (127 overs); Reeza Hendricks 168* (261); Gerald Coetzee 2/57 (21 overs)		325 (119.4 overs); Raynard van Tonder 81 (157); Malusi Siboto 3/65 (25 overs)
178/5d (70.2 overs); Rassie van der Dussen 75 (137); Shaun von Berg 2/65 (31.2 overs)		62/0 (20 overs); Raynard van Tonder 35* (48)

Match drawn
De Beers Diamond Oval, Kimberley
Umpires: Siphelele Gasa and Shaun George
Player of the match: Reeza Hendricks (Lions)

- Lions won the toss and elected to bat.

=== Round 4 ===
28–31 October 2019
Scorecard

Warriors	v	Cape Cobras
350 (110.4 overs); JJ Smuts 75* (102); George Linde 3/67 (22 overs)		379 (140.3 overs); George Linde 122 (204); Glenton Stuurman 5/72 (30.3 overs)
228/5d (82 overs); Rudi Second 84* (149); Dane Piedt 4/69 (27 overs)

Match drawn
Newlands Cricket Ground, Cape Town
Umpires: Adrian Holdstock and Stephen Harris
Player of the match: George Linde (Cape Cobras)

- Cape Cobras won the toss and elected to field.

28–31 October 2019
Scorecard

Knights	v	Titans
541/7d (157.3 overs); Raynard van Tonder 204 (360); Matthew Arnold 3/65 (32 overs)		211 (78.2 overs); Heinrich Klaasen 67 (112); Patrick Kruger 2/9 (4.2 overs)
		367/8 (135 overs) (f/o); Wesley Marshall 98 (181); Shaun von Berg 4/92 (44 overs)

Match drawn
Mangaung Oval, Bloemfontein
Umpires: Bongani Jele and John Dempsey
Player of the match: Raynard van Tonder (Knights)

- Knights won the toss and elected to bat.

28–31 October 2019
Scorecard

Dolphins	v	Lions
235 (74.1 overs); Marques Ackerman 61 (122); Migael Pretorius 5/80 (18.1 overs)		495/8d (142 overs); Rassie van der Dussen 154* (288); Keith Dudgeon 4/115 (32 overs)
245 (73.5 overs); Sibonelo Makhanya 76 (144); Malusi Siboto 3/59 (16.5 overs)

Lions won by an innings and 15 runs
Wanderers Stadium, Johannesburg
Umpires: Shaun George and Brad White
Player of the match: Rassie van der Dussen (Lions)

- Dolphins won the toss and elected to bat.

=== Round 5 ===
19–22 December 2019
Scorecard

Warriors	v	Dolphins
513 (130.5 overs); Edward Moore 228 (341); Prenelan Subrayen 4/110 (29.5 overs)		189 (46.2 overs); Marques Ackerman 79 (82); JJ Smuts 6/50 (17.2 overs)
		295 (127.1 overs) (f/o); Grant Roelofsen 112 (256); Jade de Klerk 4/69 (41 overs)

Warriors won by an innings and 29 runs
Kingsmead Cricket Ground, Durban
Umpires: Allahudien Paleker and Clifford Isaacs
Player of the match: JJ Smuts and Edward Moore (Warriors)

- Warriors won the toss and elected to bat.

19–22 December 2019
Scorecard

Lions	v	Titans
301 (78.2 overs); Wihan Lubbe 100 (137); Tabraiz Shamsi 3/60 (21.2 overs)		121 (35 overs); Heinrich Klaasen 40 (44); Eldred Hawken 5/39 (11 overs)
287 (87.1 overs); Delano Potgieter 74 (172); Dayyaan Galiem 4/45 (14.1 overs)		306 (97 overs); Heinrich Klaasen 57 (113); Eldred Hawken 3/73 (22 overs)

Lions won by 161 runs
Wanderers Stadium, Johannesburg
Umpires: Adrian Holdstock and Murray Brown
Player of the match: Eldred Hawken (Lions)

- Lions won the toss and elected to bat.

19–22 December 2019
Scorecard

Cape Cobras	v	Knights
442/8d (108.1 overs); David Bedingham 137 (179); Corné Dry 3/91 (20 overs)		269 (89.1 overs); Wandile Makwetu 101 (194); Lizaad Williams 4/93 (20 overs)
220/3d (44 overs); David Bedingham 77* (71); Shaun von Berg 2/50 (12 overs)		227/4 (87 overs); Andries Gous 63 (117); George Linde 1/35 (26 overs)

Match drawn
Boland Park, Paarl
Umpires: Arno Jacobs and Bongani Jele
Player of the match: David Bedingham (Cape Cobras)

- Cape Cobras won the toss and elected to bat.
- Wandile Makwetu (Knights) scored his maiden first-class century.

=== Round 6 ===
6–9 January 2020
Scorecard

Dolphins	v	Cape Cobras
174 (70.3 overs); Andile Phehlukwayo 61 (83); George Linde 6/51 (22 overs)		255 (83.2 overs); Simon Khomari 68 (186); Kerwin Mungroo 3/17 (7.2 overs)
304/8d (75.2 overs); Grant Roelofsen 142 (204); George Linde 5/87 (20.2 overs)		86 (35.2 overs); Janneman Malan 39 (65); Senuran Muthusamy 7/36 (17.2 overs)

Dolphins won by 137 runs
Recreation Ground, Oudtshoorn
Umpires: Arno Jacobs and Shaun George
Player of the match: Senuran Muthusamy (Dolphins)

- Dolphins won the toss and elected to bat.
- George Linde (Cape Cobras) took his tenth five-wicket haul in first-class cricket.

6–9 January 2020
Scorecard

Lions	v	Knights
358 (98.3 overs); Dominic Hendricks 150 (275); Corné Dry 5/84 (22 overs)		158 (50.4 overs); Raynard van Tonder 34 (98); Eldred Hawken 5/36 (12 overs)
20/0 (5.1 overs); Joshua Richards 20* (22)		219 (57.1 overs) (f/o); Wandile Makwetu 58 (82); Bjorn Fortuin 4/39 (12.1 overs)

Lions won by 10 wickets
Wanderers Stadium, Johannesburg
Umpires: K. N. Ananthapadmanabhan and Dennis Smith
Player of the match: Dominic Hendricks (Lions)

- Lions won the toss and elected to bat.

6–9 January 2020
Scorecard

Warriors	v	Titans
305 (96.1 overs); Sinethemba Qeshile 77 (148); Dayyaan Galiem 3/48 (24 overs)		294 (92.3 overs); Tony de Zorzi 81 (156); Sisanda Magala 5/81 (23 overs)
310/7d (71.4 overs); Edward Moore 98 (126); Tabraiz Shamsi 3/91 (19 overs)		249/4 (68.1 overs); Grant Thomson 103* (153); Kelly Smuts 2/20 (11 overs)

Match drawn
Centurion Park, Centurion
Umpires: Clifford Isaacs and Philip Vosloo
Player of the match: Edward Moore (Warriors)

- Warriors won the toss and elected to bat.

=== Round 7 ===
13–16 January 2020
Scorecard

Dolphins	v	Lions
381 (116.1 overs); Sarel Erwee 136 (330); Wihan Lubbe 5/43 (19.1 overs)		147 (52 overs); Reeza Hendricks 49 (99); Daryn Dupavillon 4/29 (13 overs)
195/6d (48.4 overs); Vaughn van Jaarsveld 50 (59); Wihan Lubbe 2/33 (10 overs)		299 (122 overs); Temba Bavuma 180 (282); Prenelan Subrayen 5/105 (42 overs)

Dolphins won by 130 runs
City Oval, Pietermaritzburg
Umpires: Siphelele Gasa and Brad White
Player of the match: Sarel Erwee (Dolphins)

- Dolphins won the toss and elected to bat.
- Wihan Lubbe (Dolphins) took his maiden five-wicket haul in first-class cricket.

13–16 January 2020
Scorecard

Titans	v	Cape Cobras
287 (66.4 overs); Hardus Viljoen 132 (110); Nandre Burger 4/42 (16.4 overs)		456 (134 overs); George Linde 148* (185); Ryan Cartwright 4/87 (30 overs)
470/5d (124.3 overs); Tony de Zorzi 213* (351); Jason Smith 2/49 (15 overs)		155/4 (44 overs); Kyle Verreynne 72* (100); Ryan Cartwright 2/35 (8 overs)

Match drawn
Newlands Cricket Ground, Cape Town
Umpires: K. N. Ananthapadmanabhan and Stephen Harris
Player of the match: Tony de Zorzi (Titans)

- Titans won the toss and elected to bat.
- Tony de Zorzi (Titans) scored his maiden double century in first-class cricket.

13–16 January 2020
Scorecard

Warriors	v	Knights
141 (42.2 overs); Yaseen Vallie 91 (113); Mbulelo Budaza 4/26 (7.2 overs)		362 (112 overs); Raynard van Tonder 80 (159); Lutho Sipamla 4/76 (25 overs)
262 (100.1 overs); Matthew Breetzke 109 (251); Shadley van Schalkwyk 4/28 (12.1 overs)		44/0 (5.3 overs); Grant Mokoena 23* (21)

Knights won by 10 wickets
Buffalo Park, East London
Umpires: Dennis Smith and Philip Vosloo

- Warriors won the toss and elected to bat.
- No play was possible on day 1.

=== Round 8 ===
20–23 January 2020
Scorecard

Cape Cobras	v	Warriors
333 (100.1 overs); Lizaad Williams 83* (131); Tian Koekemoer 3/64 (17.1 overs)		341/9d (101.4 overs); Gihahn Cloete 91 (154); George Linde 2/43 (8.4 overs)
109/1 (24.5 overs); David Bedingham 56* (50); Lutho Sipamla 1/12 (6 overs)

Match drawn
Buffalo Park, East London
Umpires: Arno Jacobs and Philip Vosloo
Player of the match: Gihahn Cloete (Warriors)

- Warriors won the toss and elected to field.

20–23 January 2020
Scorecard

Dolphins	v	Knights
335 (138.3 overs); Sarel Erwee 136 (321); Tshepo Ntuli 4/121 (47 overs)		155 (64.5 overs); Andries Gous 45 (109); Okuhle Cele 5/38 (14.5 overs)
89/7 (24 overs); Marques Ackerman 31 (21); Shaun von Berg 4/27 (9 overs)		331 (132) (f/o); Andries Gous 69 (102); Prenelan Subrayen 5/147 (55 overs)

Match drawn
Kingsmead Cricket Ground, Durban
Umpires: K. N. Ananthapadmanabhan and Brad White
Player of the match: Sarel Erwee (Dolphins)

- Dolphins won the toss and elected to bat.

20–23 January 2020
Scorecard

Lions	v	Titans
168 (52.5 overs); Migael Pretorius 32 (39); Hardus Viljoen 3/51 (17 overs)		392/9d (127.3 overs); Theunis de Bruyn 120 (209); Bjorn Fortuin 5/76 (24.3 overs)
231 (69.2 overs); Reeza Hendricks 82 (115); Ryan Cartwright 3/46 (17)		8/0 (1.4 overs); Tony de Zorzi 6* (6)

Titans won by 10 wickets
Centurion Park, Centurion
Umpires: Stephen Harris and Abdoellah Steenkamp
Player of the match: Theunis de Bruyn (Titans)

- Lions won the toss and elected to bat.

=== Round 9 ===
29 March–1 April 2020
Scorecard

Warriors	v	Dolphins

St George's Park Cricket Ground, Port Elizabeth

29 March–1 April 2020
Scorecard

Titans	v	Knights

Centurion Park, Centurion

29 March–1 April 2020
Scorecard

Cape Cobras	v	Lions

Newlands Cricket Ground, Cape Town

=== Round 10 ===
5–8 April 2020
Scorecard

Dolphins	v	Titans

Kingsmead Cricket Ground, Durban

5–8 April 2020
Scorecard

Knights	v	Cape Cobras

De Beers Diamond Oval, Kimberley

5–8 April 2020
Scorecard

Lions	v	Warriors

Senwes Park, Potchefstroom
