= 2018–19 CSA 4-Day Franchise Series =

Cricket tournament

- Dates: 26 September 2018 – 31 January 2019
- Administrator(s): Cricket South Africa
- Cricket format: First-class
- Tournament format(s): Double round-robin
- Champions: Lions (2nd title)
- Participants: 6
- Matches: 30
- Most runs: Keegan Petersen (923)
- Most wickets: Dane Piedt (54)

The 2018–19 CSA 4-Day Franchise Series was a first-class cricket competition that took place in South Africa from 26 September 2018 to 31 January 2019. It was the first edition not to be sponsored by Sunfoil, after they decided not to renew their sponsorship. Lions won the tournament after beating Warriors in the final match of the competition. They won the fixture, with just nine deliveries left in the game, to gain enough bonus points to overtake the Cape Cobras. Titans were the defending champions, but finished in last place with just one win in their ten matches.

Cricket South Africa announced that the competition would be split into two sections, with the first section lasting from September to November and the second section lasting from December and January. This was used to help prepare the national side for the Test series against Pakistan, which was played in December 2018 and January 2019. During this time, the first edition of the Mzansi Super League also took place.

== Points table ==
Teams	Pld	W	L	D	A	Pts
Lions	10	7	2	1	0	195.22
Cape Cobras	10	6	2	2	0	186.00
Warriors	10	3	4	3	0	143.84
Knights	10	2	4	3	1	113.04
Dolphins	10	1	4	5	0	110.16
Titans	10	1	4	4	1	104.66

== Fixtures ==
=== Round 1 ===
26–29 September 2018
Scorecard

Dolphins	v	Titans
269 (83.5 overs); Sibonelo Makhanya 86 (156); Alfred Mothoa 5/55 (18 overs)		308 (98.4 overs); Farhaan Behardien 68 (150); Calvin Savage 4/61 (19 overs)
315 (81.4 overs); Calvin Savage 68 (88); Chris Morris 3/39 (15 overs)		244/8 (97 overs); Theunis de Bruyn 60 (101); Keshav Maharaj 4/71 (33 overs)

Match drawn
Centurion Park, Centurion
Umpires: Stephen Harris and Brad White
Player of the match: Calvin Savage (Dolphins)

- Dolphins won the toss and elected to bat.
- Farhaan Behardien (Titans) scored his 6,000th run in first-class cricket.

1–4 October 2018
Scorecard

Knights	v	Cape Cobras
279 (92.1 overs); Pite van Biljon 100 (151); Tladi Bokako 3/51 (15.1 overs)		420 (118.5 overs); Pieter Malan 129 (296); Ryan McLaren 3/101 (26 overs)
334 (102.4 overs); Grant Mokoena 113 (179); Dane Paterson 4/68 (23 overs)		195/6 (49.5 overs); Zubayr Hamza 57 (127); Ottniel Baartman 3/39 (9 overs)

Cape Cobras won by 4 wickets
Newlands Cricket Ground, Cape Town
Umpires: Dennis Smith and Abdoellah Steenkamp
Player of the match: Pite van Biljon (Knights)

- Cape Cobras won the toss and elected to field.

1–4 October 2018
Scorecard

Warriors	v	Lions
345 (97.5 overs); Gihahn Cloete 81 (123); Aaron Phangiso 4/61 (26 overs)		470/6d (106 overs); Stephen Cook 188 (310); Anrich Nortje 4/104 (27 overs)
182 (46.3 overs); Sinethemba Qeshile 69* (109); Malusi Siboto 5/54 (13 overs)		60/1 (9.4 overs); Omphile Ramela 23* (25); Andrew Birch 1/26 (5 overs)

Lions won by 9 wickets
St George's Park Cricket Ground, Port Elizabeth
Umpires: Arno Jacobs and Lubabalo Gcuma
Player of the match: Stephen Cook (Lions)

- Lions won the toss and elected to field.

=== Round 2 ===
8–11 October 2018
Scorecard

Dolphins	v	Knights
268 (88.4 overs); Sarel Erwee 68 (157); Duanne Olivier 4/50 (19.4 overs)		266 (96.1 overs); Pite van Biljon 70 (127); Senuran Muthusamy 5/85 (31.1 overs)
135 (42.2 overs); Sarel Erwee 33 (58); Duanne Olivier 4/35 (13.2 overs)		139/5 (39 overs); Luthando Mnyanda 62 (119); Senuran Muthusamy 3/30 (9 overs)

Knights won by 5 wickets
De Beers Diamond Oval, Kimberley
Umpires: Johan Cloete and Stephen Harris
Player of the match: Duanne Olivier (Knights)

- Dolphins won the toss and elected to bat.

8–11 October 2018
Scorecard

Lions	v	Cape Cobras
104 (32.1 overs); Reeza Hendricks 41 (66); Jason Smith 3/17 (9.1 overs)		529 (127.2 overs); Janneman Malan 137 (249); Beuran Hendricks 5/101 (27 overs)
354 (102 overs); Stephen Cook 103 (198); Dane Piedt 7/118 (43 overs)

Cape Cobras won by an innings and 71 runs
Wanderers Stadium, Johannesburg
Umpires: Arno Jacobs and Brad White
Player of the match: Dane Piedt (Cape Cobras)

- Lions won the toss and elected to bat.

12–15 October 2018
Scorecard

Warriors	v	Titans
307 (73 overs); Edward Moore 116 (203); Chris Morris 6/66 (18 overs)		267 (70.3 overs); Theunis de Bruyn 103 (150); Anrich Nortje 4/67 (18.3 overs)
166/2 (31 overs); Edward Moore 73 (84); Dean Elgar 1/37 (8 overs)

Match drawn
Centurion Park, Centurion
Umpires: Dennis Smith and Murray Brown
Player of the match: Edward Moore (Warriors)

- Warriors won the toss and elected to bat.
- No play was possible on day 3 due to bad light.
- Theunis de Bruyn (Titans) scored his 4,000th run in first-class cricket.

=== Round 3 ===
22–25 October 2018
Scorecard

Warriors	v	Dolphins
175 (68.1 overs); Gihahn Cloete 63 (145); Eathan Bosch 6/38 (16.1 overs)		335 (97.2 overs); Vaughn van Jaarsveld 138 (209); Lutho Sipamla 4/59 (18.2 overs)
376 (108.4 overs); Colin Ackermann 101 (151); Senuran Muthusamy 6/98 (35 overs)		123 (43 overs); Cody Chetty 33 (39); JJ Smuts 4/17 (8 overs)

Warriors won by 93 runs
Kingsmead Cricket Ground, Durban
Umpires: Johan Cloete and Allahudien Paleker
Player of the match: Colin Ackermann (Warriors)

- Warriors won the toss and elected to bat.

22–25 October 2018
Scorecard

Knights	v	Lions
266 (77.5 overs); Rudi Second 69 (88); Beuran Hendricks 5/45 (17.5 overs)		377 (102.1 overs); Temba Bavuma 94 (127); Ryan McLaren 4/82 (25.1 overs)
89 (22.3 overs); Keegan Petersen 44 (58); Beuran Hendricks 4/24 (8 overs)

Lions won by an innings and 22 runs
Wanderers Stadium, Johannesburg
Umpires: Adrian Holdstock and Stephen Harris
Player of the match: Beuran Hendricks (Lions)

- Knights won the toss and elected to bat.

22–25 October 2018
Scorecard

Titans	v	Cape Cobras
122 (37.4 overs); Theunis de Bruyn 61 (92); Tladi Bokako 4/57 (10 overs)		337 (72.2 overs); Jason Smith 92 (131); Shaun von Berg 4/70 (16 overs)
418 (114 overs); Theunis de Bruyn 147 (211); Dane Paterson 4/78 (28 overs)		204/2 (43.2 overs); Pieter Malan 87 (124); Eldred Hawken 1/54 (11 overs)

Cape Cobras won by 8 wickets
Centurion Park, Centurion
Umpires: Bongani Jele and Lubabalo Gcuma
Player of the match: Theunis de Bruyn (Cape Cobras)

- Titans won the toss and elected to bat.

=== Round 4 ===
29 October–1 November 2018
Scorecard

Dolphins	v	Cape Cobras
225 (59.3 overs); Cody Chetty 71 (102); Mthiwekhaya Nabe 5/60 (15 overs)		337 (104.2 overs); Pieter Malan 153 (296); Robbie Frylinck 5/86 (29.2 overs)
282 (99.3 overs); Dane Vilas 72 (121); Dane Paterson 6/63 (25.3 overs)		173/5 (58.5 overs); Kyle Verreynne 46 (65); Keshav Maharaj 3/49 (22.5 overs)

Cape Cobras won by 5 wickets
Newlands Cricket Ground, Cape Town
Umpires: Adrian Holdstock and Murray Brown
Player of the match: Pieter Malan (Cape Cobras)

- Cape Cobras won the toss and elected to field.

29 October–1 November 2018
Scorecard

Knights	v	Warriors
279 (94.3 overs); Andries Gous 135 (221); Anrich Nortje 6/66 (25.3 overs)		457 (136.3 overs); Sinethemba Qeshile 99 (187); Duanne Olivier 4/119 (35.3 overs)
366/6 (106 overs); Pite van Biljon 177* (292); Lutho Sipamla 2/63 (14 overs)

Match drawn
St George's Park Cricket Ground, Port Elizabeth
Umpires: Siphelele Gasa and Allahudien Paleker
Player of the match: Pite van Biljon (Knights) and Andries Gous (Knights)

- Knights won the toss and elected to bat.

29 October–1 November 2018
Scorecard

Lions	v	Titans
530 (133.3 overs); Rassie van der Dussen 175 (257); Eldred Hawken 4/95 (26 overs)		419 (143.5 overs); Dean Elgar 128 (200); Beuran Hendricks 3/77 (28 overs)
154/5 (46 overs); Stephen Cook 51 (77); Matthew Arnold 2/22 (7 overs)

Match drawn
Senwes Park, Potchefstroom
Umpires: Philip Vosloo and Brad White
Player of the match: Rassie van der Dussen (Lions)

- Lions won the toss and elected to bat.

=== Round 5 ===
5–8 November 2018
Scorecard

Lions	v	Cape Cobras
337 (98.3 overs); Wihan Lubbe 101 (181); Dane Paterson 5/81 (24.3 overs)		138 (51.1 overs); Zubayr Hamza 56 (113); Aaron Phangiso 3/11 (6 overs)
233 (74.4 overs); Nicky van den Bergh 83 (141); Dane Piedt 5/99 (37 overs)		246 (81.2 overs); Pieter Malan 101 (235); Bjorn Fortuin 3/37 (18 overs)

Lions won by 186 runs
Boland Park, Paarl
Umpires: Adrian Holdstock and Clifford Isaacs
Player of the match: Wihan Lubbe (Lions)

- Cape Cobras won the toss and elected to field.
- Pieter Malan (Cape Cobras) scored his 30th century in first-class cricket.

5–8 November 2018
Scorecard

Dolphins	v	Titans
186 (59 overs); Keshav Maharaj 76 (75); Tshepo Moreki 3/34 (13 overs)		381 (104 overs); Eldred Hawken 84* (59); Okuhle Cele 3/63 (16 overs)
302/8 (84 overs); Vaughn van Jaarsveld 133 (157); Eldred Hawken 3/59 (18 overs)

Match drawn
Kingsmead Cricket Ground, Durban
Umpires: Thomas Mokorosi and Stephen Harris
Player of the match: Eldred Hawken (Titans)

- Dolphins won the toss and elected to bat.

5–8 November 2018
Scorecard

Knights	v	Warriors
293 (102.4 overs); Grant Mokoena 99 (200); Anrich Nortje 5/51 (18.4 overs)		134 (38.4 overs); Edward Moore 37 (51); Tshepo Ntuli 4/58 (14 overs)
330/4d (70.2 overs); Keegan Petersen 103* (133); Sisanda Magala 2/30 (5 overs)		205 (60.4 overs); Edward Moore 60 (123); Ryan McLaren 4/42 (13 overs)

Knights won by 284 runs
De Beers Diamond Oval, Kimberley
Umpires: Allahudien Paleker and Ryan Hendricks
Player of the match: Keegan Petersen (Knights)

- Knights won the toss and elected to bat.
- This was the biggest win by Knights in franchise cricket.

=== Round 6 ===
19–22 December 2018
Scorecard

Cape Cobras	v	Warriors
266 (66.2 overs); Pieter Malan 72 (143); Sisanda Magala 3/66 (13 overs)		252 (76.5 overs); Edward Moore 75 (133); Mthiwekhaya Nabe 3/43 (17 overs)
403/3d (111.4 overs); Janneman Malan 168 (279); Basheeru-Deen Walters 1/66 (19 overs)		380 (117.4 overs); Gihahn Cloete 108 (193); Dane Piedt 8/130 (50.4 overs)

Cape Cobras won by 37 runs
St George's Park Cricket Ground, Port Elizabeth
Umpires: Johan Cloete and Lubabalo Gcuma
Player of the match: Janneman Malan (Cape Cobras)

- Cape Cobras won the toss and elected to bat.

19–22 December 2018
Scorecard

Titans	v	Knights
303 (85 overs); Faf du Plessis 84 (125); Duanne Olivier 4/23 (16 overs)		231 (75.1 overs); Grant Mokoena 58 (87); Tabraiz Shamsi 5/83 (26.1 overs)
242 (68.5 overs); Jonathan Vandiar 102 (153); Shadley van Schalkwyk 5/80 (22 overs)		249 (73.2 overs); Andries Gous 68 (103); Chris Morris 3/55 (12.4 overs)

Titans won by 65 runs
Mangaung Oval, Bloemfontein
Umpires: Bongani Jele and Stephen Harris
Player of the match: Jonathan Vandiar (Titans)

- Knights won the toss and elected to field.

19–22 December 2018
Scorecard

Dolphins	v	Lions
303 (91.5 overs); Khaya Zondo 114 (220); Dwaine Pretorius 6/38 (18.5 overs)		134 (41.5 overs); Wihan Lubbe 36 (79); Kerwin Mungroo 3/35 (7.5 overs)
216 (63.1 overs); Vaughn van Jaarsveld 33 (45); Dwaine Pretorius 4/37 (20.1 overs)		106 (19.4 overs); Rassie van der Dussen 37 (34); Eathan Bosch 4/35 (8 overs)

Dolphins won by 279 runs
Wanderers Stadium, Johannesburg
Umpires: Allahudien Paleker and Murray Brown
Player of the match: Khaya Zondo (Dolphins)

- Dolphins won the toss and elected to bat.
- Khaya Zondo (Dolphins) scored his tenth century in first-class cricket.

=== Round 7 ===
4–7 January 2019
Scorecard

Warriors	v	Titans
408 (95.5 overs); Edward Moore 151 (220); Corbin Bosch 3/48 (14 overs)		366 (117.5 overs); Heinrich Klaasen 73 (122); Lesiba Ngoepe 3/27 (8 overs)
310/5d (80 overs); Colin Ackermann 92 (156); Shaun von Berg 2/112 (30 overs)		136 (45 overs); Corbin Bosch 59 (81); Basheeru-Deen Walters 5/35 (9 overs)

Warriors won by 216 runs
Buffalo Park, East London
Umpires: Arno Jacobs and Bongani Jele
Player of the match: Edward Moore (Warriors)

- Warriors won the toss and elected to bat.

4–7 January 2019
Scorecard

Lions	v	Dolphins
423 (136.3 overs); Stephen Cook 130 (257); Senuran Muthusamy 4/119 (46 overs)		149 (67.5 overs); Sibonelo Makhanya 38 (124); Malusi Siboto 3/27 (14 overs)
47/1 (14.1 overs); Reeza Hendricks 22* (38); Sarel Erwee 1/9 (1 over)		319 (93.3 overs) (f/o); Sibonelo Makhanya 128 (230); Beuran Hendricks 3/79 (22 overs)

Lions won by 9 wickets
Kingsmead Cricket Ground, Durban
Umpires: Adrian Holdstock and Tim Parlane
Player of the match: Stephen Cook (Lions)

- Lions won the toss and elected to bat.

4–7 January 2019
Scorecard

Knights	v	Cape Cobras
319 (100.1 overs); Keegan Petersen 161 (286); Dane Paterson 3/69 (21 overs)		470 (138.2 overs); Dane Piedt 114 (145); Shadley van Schalkwyk 4/67 (26 overs)
360/2 (91 overs); Keegan Petersen 165* (261); Simon Khomari 1/51 (9 overs)

Match drawn
Mangaung Oval, Bloemfontein
Umpires: Dennis Smith and Allahudien Paleker
Player of the match: Keegan Petersen (Knights)

- Knights won the toss and elected to bat.
- Dane Piedt (Cape Cobras) scored his maiden century in first-class cricket.

=== Round 8 ===
14–17 January 2019
Scorecard

Cape Cobras	v	Warriors
239 (73.2 overs); Jason Smith 74 (115); Basheeru-Deen Walters 3/51 (19 overs)		343 (88.4 overs); Colin Ackermann 78 (152); Jason Smith 4/62 (15.4 overs)
309 (89.2 overs); David Bedingham 90 (144); Simon Harmer 7/89 (36.2 overs)		206/4 (47.5 overs); JJ Smuts 70* (73); Dane Piedt 4/68 (20.5 overs)

Warriors won by 6 wickets
Newlands Cricket Ground, Cape Town
Umpires: Johan Cloete and Tim Parlane
Player of the match: Jason Smith (Cape Cobras)

- Warriors won the toss and elected to field.

14–17 January 2019
Scorecard

Dolphins	v	Knights
354/7d (102.3 overs); Marques Ackerman 137 (185); Thandolwethu Mnyaka 3/71 (23.3 overs)		206/9d (58 overs); Rudi Second 80* (138); Eathan Bosch 4/82 (16 overs)
146/3d (26 overs); Khaya Zondo 59* (45); Patrick Kruger 1/8 (3 overs)		181/3 (35 overs); Keegan Petersen 71* (92); Eathan Bosch 3/44 (12 overs)

Match drawn
City Oval, Pietermaritzburg
Umpires: Clifford Isaacs and Murray Brown
Player of the match: Marques Ackerman (Dolphins)

- Dolphins won the toss and elected to bat.
- Thamsanqa Khumalo (Dolphins) made his first-class debut.

14–17 January 2019
Scorecard

Titans	v	Lions
229 (60.5 overs); Chris Morris 97 (77); Wiaan Mulder 4/55 (15.5 overs)		593/5d (148.3 overs); Nicky van den Bergh 217* (227); Henry Davids 2/129 (35.3 overs)
125 (51.4 overs); Farhaan Behardien 41 (54); Nandre Burger 5/36 (14.4 overs)

Lions won by an innings and 239 runs
Willowmoore Park, Benoni
Umpires: Shaun George and Yeshwant Barde
Player of the match: Nicky van den Bergh (Lions)

- Lions won the toss and elected to field.
- This was the biggest win for the Lions in the history of the four-day tournament in South Africa.

=== Round 9 ===
21–24 January 2019
Scorecard

Titans	v	Cape Cobras
275 (108.2 overs); Leus du Plooy 97* (257); Dane Piedt 6/75 (41.2 overs)		375 (109.3 overs); Pieter Malan 95 (184); Shaun von Berg 4/137 (44.3 overs)
151 (65.1 overs); Andrea Agathangelou 84 (181); Dane Piedt 7/66 (28.1 overs)		55/2 (9.2 overs); Zubayr Hamza 26* (23); Leus du Plooy 2/29 (4.2 overs)

Cape Cobras won by 8 wickets
Recreation Ground, Oudtshoorn
Umpires: Siphelele Gasa and Brad White
Player of the match: Dane Piedt (Cape Cobras)

- Titans won the toss and elected to bat.

21–24 January 2019
Scorecard

Warriors	v	Dolphins
436/7d (122.2 overs); Yaseen Vallie 110 (177); Keith Dudgeon 2/70 (25 overs)		325 (84.4 overs); Marques Ackerman 84 (129); JJ Smuts 3/34 (11.4 overs)
163/9d (43.3 overs); Sinethemba Qeshile 45 (52); Eathan Bosch 4/36 (14 overs)		171/5 (30 overs); Marques Ackerman 77 (71); Basheeru-Deen Walters 2/35 (9 overs)

Match drawn
Buffalo Park, East London
Umpires: Philip Vosloo and Lubabalo Gcuma
Player of the match: Yaseen Vallie (Warriors)

- Warriors won the toss and elected to bat.

21–24 January 2019
Scorecard

Knights	v	Lions
357 (113.3 overs); Keegan Petersen 71 (138); Bjorn Fortuin 7/70 (30.3 overs)		490 (135.3 overs); Wiaan Mulder 146 (243); Patrick Kruger 5/60 (19.3 overs)
208 (72.1 overs); Andries Gous 70 (101); Nono Pongolo 4/49 (18 overs)		76/5 (26 overs); Dominic Hendricks 49* (74); Jacques Snyman 4/24 (11 overs)

Lions won by 5 wickets
Mangaung Oval, Bloemfontein
Umpires: Stephen Harris and Yeshwant Barde
Player of the match: Wiaan Mulder (Lions)

- Knights won the toss and elected to bat.

=== Round 10 ===
28–31 January 2019
Scorecard

Dolphins	v	Cape Cobras
310 (86.2 overs); Vaughn van Jaarsveld 120 (153); George Linde 4/62 (21 overs)		523/7d (137 overs); Zubayr Hamza 201 (342); Keshav Maharaj 2/217 (56 overs)
358/2 (87 overs); Marques Ackerman 89* (128); Pieter Malan 1/26 (9 overs)

Match drawn
Pietermaritzburg Oval, Pietermaritzburg
Umpires: Dennis Smith and Yeshwant Barde
Player of the match: Zubayr Hamza (Cape Cobras)

- Cape Cobras won the toss and elected to field.
- Zubayr Hamza (Cape Cobras) scored his first double century in franchise cricket.

28–31 January 2019
Scorecard

Lions	v	Warriors
440 (98.3 overs); Bjorn Fortuin 183 (227); Glenton Stuurman 5/110 (23 overs)		403 (104.5 overs); Thomas Kaber 85 (163); Delano Potgieter 4/81 (23 overs)
292/9d (68 overs); Kagiso Rapulana 114* (166); Sithembile Langa 5/61 (15 overs)		245 (89.3 overs); Yaseen Vallie 74 (125); Nandre Burger 4/72 (22 overs)

Lions won by 84 runs
Senwes Park, Potchefstroom
Umpires: Siphelele Gasa and Clifford Isaacs
Player of the match: Bjorn Fortuin (Lions)

- Warriors won the toss and elected to field.

28–31 January 2019
Scorecard

Titans	v	Knights

Match abandoned
Willowmoore Park, Benoni
Umpires: Johan Cloete and Abdoellah Steenkamp

- No toss.
- No play was possible due to rain.
