= South African cricket team in New Zealand in 2023–24 =

International cricket tour

	New Zealand	South Africa
- Dates: 4 – 17 February 2024
Captains	Tim Southee	Neil Brand

Test series
- Result: New Zealand won the 2-match series 2–0
Most runs	Kane Williamson (403)	David Bedingham (268)
Most wickets	William O’Rourke (9)	Neil Brand (8); Dane Piedt (8)
- Player of the series: Kane Williamson (NZ)

The South Africa cricket team toured New Zealand in February 2024 to play two Test matches. The Test matches formed part of 2023–2025 ICC World Test Championship.

The series was contested for the Tangiwai Shield. The trophy commemorated the Tangiwai disaster of Christmas Eve 1953, when 151 people on board a train from Wellington to Auckland lost their lives in a rail disaster. The casualties included Nerissa Love, the fiancé of New Zealand fast bowler Bob Blair, who at that time was playing in a Test match between New Zealand and South Africa.

Going into the series, South Africa had never lost a Test series against New Zealand in 17 meetings.

New Zealand won the first Test by 281 runs, and the second Test by 7 wickets, winning the series 2–0. It was the first time New Zealand had won a Test series against South Africa.

The strength of the South African side was greatly compromised due to the ongoing 2024 SA20. The squad was composed of second string and inexperienced players, as only half of its 14 players had ever played a Test match, and none of them were considered to be in South Africa's best eleven. The decision to withhold South Africa's best players resulted in intense criticism being directed towards the CSA, raising concerns about the potential harm caused to the relevance of Test cricket in the long term.

== Squads ==
New Zealand	South Africa
Tim Southee (c); Tom Blundell (wk); Devon Conway; Matt Henry; Kyle Jamieson; Tom Latham (wk); Daryl Mitchell; William O'Rourke; Glenn Phillips; Rachin Ravindra; Mitchell Santner; Neil Wagner; Kane Williamson; Will Young	Neil Brand (c); David Bedingham; Ruan de Swardt; Clyde Fortuin (wk); Zubayr Hamza; Edward Moore; Tshepo Moreki; Mihlali Mpongwana; Duanne Olivier; Dane Paterson; Keegan Petersen; Dane Piedt; Raynard van Tonder; Shaun von Berg; Khaya Zondo

In December 2023, Cricket South Africa (CSA) announced an understrength Test team for the tour, composed of players with little or no Test cricket experience, in order to allow their best players to remain in South Africa to compete in the SA20 (a domestic Twenty20 franchise tournament). The decision was widely criticised. Former Australian captain Steve Waugh was particularly critical, stating his opinion that Test cricket was in danger of no longer being the highest format of the game as the best players were incentivised to play Twenty20 because of better pay.

On 16 January 2024, Edward Moore was added to South Africa's squad.

On 8 February 2024, New Zealand's Daryl Mitchell was ruled out of the second Test due to an injury, with William O'Rourke added to the squad.

== Tour match ==
29–31 January 2024
Scorecard

South Africa	v	New Zealand XI
339 (81.2 overs); Raynard van Tonder 54* (47); Dean Foxcroft 2/36 (14 overs)		294 (81.5 overs); Leo Carter 100* (192); Dane Paterson 4/34 (10.5 overs)
91/2 (31 overs); Clyde Fortuin 30* (53); Jacob Duffy 1/7 (5 overs)

Match drawn
Bert Sutcliffe Oval, Lincoln
Umpires: John Dempsey (NZ) and Pete Pasco (NZ)

- Toss uncontested, South Africa batted first.

== Test series ==
=== 1st Test ===
4–7 February 2024
Scorecard

New Zealand	v	South Africa
511 (144 overs); Rachin Ravindra 240 (366); Neil Brand 6/119 (26 overs)		162 (72.5 overs); Keegan Petersen 45 (132); Matt Henry 3/31 (14 overs)
179/4d (43 overs); Kane Williamson 109 (132); Neil Brand 2/52 (13 overs)		247 (80 overs); David Bedingham 87 (96); Kyle Jamieson 4/58 (17 overs)

New Zealand won by 281 runs
Bay Oval, Mount Maunganui
Umpires: Richard Kettleborough (Eng) and Ahsan Raza (Pak)
Player of the match: Rachin Ravindra (NZ)

- South Africa won the toss and elected to field.
- Neil Brand, Ruan de Swardt, Clyde Fortuin, Edward Moore, Tshepo Moreki and Raynard van Tonder (SA) all made their Test debuts.
- Neil Brand captained South Africa for the first time in Tests.
- Tshepo Moreki (SA) became the 24th cricketer to take a wicket with his first ball in his first Test.
- Kane Williamson (NZ) scored his 30th and 31st centuries in Tests. He became the fifth New Zealand player to score centuries in both innings of a Test match.
- Rachin Ravindra (NZ) scored his first hundred and first double hundred in Tests.
- Rachin Ravindra's score of 240 was the highest individual score as a maiden test hundred for New Zealand.
- Neil Brand (SA) became the 25th South African to take five wickets on Test debut. His 6/119 were the best figures for a captain in his debut Test, and for a South African spinner on his Test debut.
- World Test Championship points: New Zealand 12, South Africa 0

=== 2nd Test ===
13–16 February 2024
Scorecard

South Africa	v	New Zealand
242 (97.2 overs); Ruan de Swardt 64 (156); William O'Rourke 4/59 (18.2 overs)		211 (77.3 overs); Kane Williamson 43 (108); Dane Piedt 5/89 (32.3 overs)
235 (69.5 overs); David Bedingham 110 (141); William O'Rourke 5/34 (13.5 overs)		269/3 (94.2 overs); Kane Williamson 133* (260); Dane Piedt 3/93 (32 overs)

New Zealand won by 7 wickets
Seddon Park, Hamilton
Umpires: Richard Illingworth (Eng) and Ahsan Raza (Pak)
Player of the match: William O'Rourke (NZ)

- South Africa won the toss and elected to bat.
- William O'Rourke (NZ) and Shaun von Berg (SA) both made their Test debuts.
- David Bedingham (SA) scored his first century in Tests.
- William O'Rourke (NZ) became the tenth New Zealand player to take a five–wicket haul on Test debut. His match figures of 9/93 were the best for a New Zealand bowler on his Test debut.
- New Zealand won their first ever Test series against South Africa.
- World Test Championship points: New Zealand 12, South Africa 0
