= Australian cricket team in South Africa in 2026–27 =

International cricket tour

	South Africa	Australia
- Dates: 24 September – 31 October 2026
Captains	Temba Bavuma (Note: Aiden Markram captained in the 3rd ODI.)	Pat Cummins (Tests); Mitchell Marsh (ODIs) (Note: Pat Cummins was earlier announced as captain; however, he did not captain in any of the ODIs.)

Test series
- Result: South Africa won the 3-match series 2–1
Most runs	Temba Bavuma (218)	Matt Renshaw (369)
Most wickets	Simon Harmer (14)	Mitchell Starc (15)
- Player of the series: Marco Jansen (SA)

One Day International series
- Results: South Africa won the 3-match series 2–1
Most runs	Matthew Breetzke (171)	Mitchell Marsh (200)
Most wickets	Keshav Maharaj (6); Corbin Bosch (6)	Jack Edwards (5)
- Player of the series: Keshav Maharaj (SA)

The Australia national cricket team toured South Africa in September and October 2026 to play three One Day International (ODI) and three Test matches. The Test series formed part of the 2025–2027 World Test Championship cycle. In February 2026, Cricket South Africa (CSA) confirmed the fixtures for the tour, as a part of the 2026 home international season.

The 2026 Test series marked the first time since Australia's controversial 2017–18 tour that Australia had played South Africa in South Africa in Test cricket. South Africa won both the ODI series and Test series by 2–1. By winning the Test series, South Africa became the number 1 ranked team in Tests after nearly 10 years.

== Squads ==
South Africa		Australia	
Tests	ODIs	Tests	ODIs
Temba Bavuma (c); Marques Ackerman; David Bedingham; Corbin Bosch; Matthew Breetzke; Gerald Coetzee; Tony de Zorzi; Simon Harmer; Marco Jansen; Keshav Maharaj; Aiden Markram; Wiaan Mulder; Senuran Muthusamy; Anrich Nortje; Dane Paterson; Kagiso Rabada; Ryan Rickelton (wk); Tristan Stubbs; Kyle Verreynne (wk)	Temba Bavuma (c); ~~Ottneil Baartman~~; Corbin Bosch; Matthew Breetzke; Gerald Coetzee; Quinton de Kock (wk); Tony de Zorzi; Bjorn Fortuin; Duan Jansen; Marco Jansen; Keshav Maharaj; ~~Kwena Maphaka~~; Aiden Markram; David Miller; Nqobani Mokoena; ~~Lungi Ngidi~~; Ryan Rickelton; Tristan Stubbs; Lizaad Williams	Pat Cummins (c); Steve Smith (vc); Scott Boland; Alex Carey (wk); Cooper Connolly; Cameron Green; Sam Harper (wk); Josh Hazlewood; Travis Head; Josh Inglis (wk); Matthew Kuhnemann; Marnus Labuschagne; Nathan Lyon; Nic Maddinson; Michael Neser; Matt Renshaw; Mitchell Starc; Beau Webster	Pat Cummins (c); Mitchell Marsh (vc); Xavier Bartlett; Alex Carey (wk); Cooper Connolly; Joel Davies; Jack Edwards; Nathan Ellis; Cameron Green; Josh Hazlewood; Travis Head; Josh Inglis (wk); ~~Spencer Johnson~~; Oliver Peake; Matt Renshaw; ~~Billy Stanlake~~; Mitchell Starc; Adam Zampa

On 12 September, Ottneil Baartman was ruled out from the ODI series due to a hamstring injury and was replaced by Duan Jansen. On 18 September, Lungi Ngidi was ruled out from the ODI series due to a hamstring injury and was replaced by Nqobani Mokoena. On 23 September, Kwena Maphaka was ruled out from the ODI series due to a right hamstring strain and was replaced by Lizaad Williams.

On 21 September, Billy Stanlake and Spencer Johnson were ruled out of the ODI series following a side strain and management, Jack Edwards was named in their place. On 29 September, both Nathan Ellis and Joel Davies were ruled out of the last ODI due to side strain and a hamstring strain, respectively with no replacements named. On 1 October, Josh Inglis was ruled out of the Test series due to fractured finger and was replaced by Sam Harper. Cameron Green's availability was uncertain after he sustained lower abdominal strain, Nic Maddinson was added in the squad for his cover. Later, Inglis rejoined the squad for remaining matches.

On 15 October, Matthew Breetzke was added to South Africa's squad as a replacement for Tristan Stubbs who was dropped from the squad.

== Venues ==
In February 2026, Cricket South Africa (CSA) announced their men's team home schedule, confirming the ODI and Test venues for the series against Australia. Durban's Kingsmead Cricket Ground, Johannesburg's Wanderers Stadium, Potchefstroom's JB Marks Oval, Gqeberha's St George's Park Cricket Ground, and Cape Town's Newlands Cricket Ground were revealed to host the three ODIs and three Test matches, respectively.

Durban	Johannesburg	Cape Town	Potchefstroom
Kingsmead Cricket Ground	Wanderers Stadium	Newlands Cricket Ground	JB Marks Oval
Capacity: 25,000	Capacity: 34,000	Capacity: 25,000	Capacity: 18,000
Gqeberha			
St George's Park Cricket Ground
Capacity: 19,000

== Tour match ==
Australia played a two-day match against the South Africa XI team.

3–4 October 2026
Scorecard

South Africa Invitation XI	v	Australia
318/7d (90 overs); Neil Brand 152 (174); Josh Hazlewood 1/17 (9 overs)		368/6 (74 overs); Marnus Labuschagne 111 (89); Neil Brand 1/32 (6 overs)

Match drawn
Senwes Park, Potchefstroom
Umpires: Lubabalo Gcuma (SA) and Arno Jacobs (SA)

- Australia won the toss and elected to field.

== ODI series ==
=== 1st ODI ===
24 September 2026
10:00
Scorecard

South Africa; 297/8 (50 overs)	v	Australia; 230 (41.2 overs)
Matthew Breetzke 112 (106); Nathan Ellis 3/57 (10 overs)		Mitchell Marsh 60 (36); Keshav Maharaj 4/20 (9.2 overs)

South Africa won by 67 runs
Kingsmead Cricket Ground, Durban
Umpires: Lubabalo Gcuma (SA) and Asif Yaqoob (Pak)
Player of the match: Matthew Breetzke (SA)

- Australia won the toss and elected to field.
- Jack Edwards (Aus) made his ODI debut.

=== 2nd ODI ===
27 September 2026
10:00
Scorecard

South Africa; 365/9 (50 overs)	v	Australia; 333 (49.5 overs)
David Miller 142 (93); Jack Edwards 5/67 (10 overs)		Mitchell Marsh 84 (53); Lizaad Williams 3/54 (7.5 overs)

South Africa won by 32 runs
Wanderers Stadium, Johannesburg
Umpires: Richard Illingworth (Eng) and Arno Jacobs (SA)
Player of the match: David Miller (SA)

- Australia won the toss and elected to field.
- David Miller (SA) hit his 150th six in ODIs. He became the second South African after AB de Villiers to achieve this record.
- Jack Edwards (Aus) took his maiden five-wicket haul in ODIs.

=== 3rd ODI ===
30 September 2026
13:30 (D/N)
Scorecard

Australia; 322/9 (50 overs)	v	South Africa; 145/4 (28 overs)
Alex Carey 74 (88); Corbin Bosch 4/60 (9 overs)		Ryan Rickelton 71* (81); Xavier Bartlett 2/25 (5 overs)

Australia won by 45 runs (DLS method)
JB Marks Oval, Potchefstroom
Umpires: Lubabalo Gcuma (SA) and Asif Yaqoob (Pak)
Player of the match: Alex Carey (Aus)

- South Africa won the toss and elected to field.
- South Africa's innings was curtailed at 28 overs due to rain; DLS par score was 191.
- Alex Carey (Aus) scored his 2,500th run in ODIs.

== Test series ==
=== 1st Test ===
9–13 October 2026
Scorecard

Australia	v	South Africa
390 (137.2 overs); Matt Renshaw 190 (397); Wiaan Mulder 4/68 (27 overs)		284 (78 overs); David Bedingham 49 (73); Pat Cummins 3/54 (15 overs)
314/6d (58 overs); Matt Renshaw 82 (99); Keshav Maharaj 2/56 (9 overs)		206 (86.5 overs); Aiden Markram 75 (237); Josh Hazlewood 6/49 (16.5 overs)

Australia won by 214 runs
Kingsmead Cricket Ground, Durban
Umpires: Chris Gaffaney (NZ) and Richard Kettleborough (Eng)
Player of the match: Matt Renshaw (Aus)

- Australia won the toss and elected to bat.
- Only 65.2 overs were played on Day 1 due to bad light.
- This was Australia's oldest playing XI in their 149-year Test history, with all 11 players aged 30 or older.
- Australia set a Test record for the most catches taken in a match (18) without a single dropped catch.
- Steve Smith (Aus) surpassed Joe Root to become the fielder with most catches in the history of Test cricket.
- World Test Championship points: Australia 12, South Africa 0

=== 2nd Test ===
18–22 October 2026
Scorecard

South Africa	v	Australia
425/9d (127.1 overs); Temba Bavuma 179 (334); Scott Boland 5/81 (29 overs)		99 (42.3 overs); Steve Smith 28 (88); Marco Jansen 5/33 (11 overs)
		295 (107.1 overs) (f/o); Travis Head 121 (190); Kagiso Rabada 4/77 (23 overs)

South Africa won by an innings and 31 runs
St George's Park Cricket Ground, Gqeberha
Umpires: Richard Illingworth (Eng) and Arno Jacobs (SA) (Note: Jacobs replaced Chris Gaffaney (NZ) for majority of the play as the later was ruled out due to illness.)
Player of the match: Temba Bavuma (SA)

- Australia won the toss and elected to field.
- Only 12.2 overs were played on Day 1 due to rain.
- Only 30.4 overs were played on Day 2 due to rain and a wet outfield.
- No play was possible until 12:00 on Day 5 due to rain.
- Marques Ackerman (SA) made his Test debut.
- The 183-run partnership between Temba Bavuma and Simon Harmer was the highest 8th wicket partnership for South Africa in Tests and the highest 8th wicket partnership in the history of the World Test Championship.
- Steve Smith (Aus) scored his 11,000th run in Tests.
- World Test Championship points: South Africa 12, Australia 0

=== 3rd Test ===
27–31 October 2026
Scorecard

South Africa	v	Australia
329 (82.3 overs); Marques Ackerman 95 (94); Mitchell Starc 6/72 (16.3 overs)		429 (125.1 overs); Josh Inglis 102 (135); Simon Harmer 4/104 (37 overs)
387 (134.4 overs); Wiaan Mulder 115 (221); Mitchell Starc 3/65 (24 overs)		111 (57.1 overs); Nathan Lyon 33* (57); Simon Harmer 6/16 (21.1 overs)

South Africa won by 176 runs
Newlands Cricket Ground, Cape Town
Umpires: Richard Illingworth (Eng) and Richard Kettleborough (Eng)
Player of the match: Simon Harmer (SA)

- Australia won the toss and elected to field.
- Richard Kettleborough (Eng) stood as the on-field umpire in his 100th Test.
- Marco Jansen (SA) took his 100th wicket in Tests.
- Temba Bavuma (SA) scored his 4,000th run in Tests.
- Ryan Rickelton (SA) scored his 1,000th run in Tests.
- Kagiso Rabada (SA) took his 350th wicket in Tests, becoming the fourth South African bowler to reach this landmark.
- Cameron Green (Aus) scored his 2,000th run in Tests.
- Simon Harmer (SA) took his maiden ten-wicket haul in Tests.
- World Test Championship points: South Africa 12, Australia 0
