= Indian cricket team in South Africa in 2023–24 =

International cricket tour

	South Africa	India
- Dates: 10 December 2023 – 7 January 2024
Captains	Temba Bavuma (Note: Dean Elgar captained South Africa in the second Test.) (Tests); Aiden Markram (ODIs & T20Is)	Rohit Sharma (Tests); KL Rahul (ODIs); Suryakumar Yadav (T20Is)

Test series
- Result: 2-match series drawn 1–1
Most runs	Dean Elgar (201)	Virat Kohli (172)
Most wickets	Nandre Burger (11); Kagiso Rabada (11)	Jasprit Bumrah (12)
- Player of the series: Dean Elgar (SA); Jasprit Bumrah (Ind)

One Day International series
- Results: India won the 3-match series 2–1
Most runs	Tony de Zorzi (228)	Sai Sudharsan (127)
Most wickets	Beuran Hendricks (5); Nandre Burger (5)	Arshdeep Singh (10)
- Player of the series: Arshdeep Singh (Ind)

Twenty20 International series
- Results: 3-match series drawn 1–1
Most runs	Reeza Hendricks (57)	Suryakumar Yadav (156)
Most wickets	Gerald Coetzee (3); Lizaad Williams (3)	Kuldeep Yadav (6)
- Player of the series: Suryakumar Yadav (Ind)

The Indian cricket team toured South Africa from December 2023 to January 2024 to play three Twenty20 Internationals (T20Is), three One Day Internationals (ODIs) and two Test matches. The Test series, where the teams were competing for the Freedom Trophy, formed part of the 2023–2025 ICC World Test Championship. The T20I series formed part of both teams' preparation for the 2024 ICC Men's T20 World Cup tournament. On 14 July 2023, Cricket South Africa (CSA) and Board of Control for Cricket in India (BCCI) announced the schedule of the tour.

The T20I series was drawn 1–1, after first T20I was washed out due to rain.

India won the ODI series 2–1.

On 22 December 2023, South Africa's Dean Elgar announced that he would retire from the Tests after the Test series.

South Africa won the first Test by an innings and 32 runs. India went on to win the second Test by 7 wickets, and drew the Test series 1–1.

== Squads ==
South Africa			India		
Tests	ODIs	T20Is	Tests	ODIs	T20Is
Temba Bavuma (c); David Bedingham; Nandre Burger; Gerald Coetzee; Dean Elgar; Zubayr Hamza; Marco Jansen; Aiden Markram; Keshav Maharaj; Wiaan Mulder; Lungi Ngidi; Keegan Petersen; Kagiso Rabada; Tristan Stubbs; Kyle Verreynne (wk); Tony de Zorzi	Aiden Markram (c); ~~Ottniel Baartman~~; Nandre Burger; Tony de Zorzi; Beuran Hendricks; Reeza Hendricks; Heinrich Klaasen; Keshav Maharaj; Mihlali Mpongwana; David Miller; Wiaan Mulder; Andile Phehlukwayo; Tabraiz Shamsi; Rassie van der Dussen; Kyle Verreynne; Lizaad Williams	Aiden Markram (c); Ottniel Baartman; Nandre Burger; Matthew Breetzke; Gerald Coetzee; Donovan Ferreira; Beuran Hendricks; Reeza Hendricks; Marco Jansen; Heinrich Klaasen; Keshav Maharaj; David Miller; ~~Lungi Ngidi~~; Andile Phehlukwayo; Tabraiz Shamsi; Tristan Stubbs; Lizaad Williams	Rohit Sharma (c); Jasprit Bumrah (vc); Ravichandran Ashwin; KS Bharat (wk); Abhimanyu Easwaran; ~~Ruturaj Gaikwad~~; Shubman Gill; Shreyas Iyer; Ravindra Jadeja; Yashasvi Jaiswal; Avesh Khan; ~~Ishan Kishan (wk)~~; Virat Kohli; Mukesh Kumar; Prasidh Krishna; KL Rahul (wk); ~~Mohammed Shami~~; Mohammed Siraj; Shardul Thakur	KL Rahul (c, wk); Shreyas Iyer (vc); ~~Deepak Chahar~~; Yuzvendra Chahal; Akash Deep; Ruturaj Gaikwad; Avesh Khan; Mukesh Kumar; Axar Patel; Rajat Patidar; Sanju Samson (wk); Arshdeep Singh; Rinku Singh; Sai Sudharsan; Washington Sundar; Tilak Varma; Kuldeep Yadav	Suryakumar Yadav (c); Ravindra Jadeja (vc); Ravi Bishnoi; ~~Deepak Chahar~~; Ruturaj Gaikwad; Shubman Gill; Shreyas Iyer; Yashasvi Jaiswal; Ishan Kishan (wk); Mukesh Kumar; Jitesh Sharma (wk); Arshdeep Singh; Rinku Singh; Mohammed Siraj; Washington Sundar; Tilak Varma; Kuldeep Yadav

South Africa's Gerald Coetzee, Marco Jansen and Lungi Ngidi were selected for the first two T20Is only. However, Ngidi was ruled out from the T20I series due to an injury and replaced by Beuran Hendricks.

On 16 December 2023, India's Mohammed Shami was ruled out of the test series due to an injury. India's Deepak Chahar was unavailable for the both ODI and T20I series citing family medical emergency. Chahar was replaced by Akash Deep in the ODI squad. Shreyas Iyer was also unavailable for the last two ODIs to prepare for the Test matches.

On 17 December 2023, India's Ishan Kishan was withdrawn from the test team for personal reasons expressed and was replaced by KS Bharat.

On 19 December 2023, Andile Phehlukwayo and Ottniel Baartman were ruled out of the last two ODIs due to injuries, with Beuran Hendricks was added to South Africa's squad.

On 22 December 2023, India's Ruturaj Gaikwad was ruled out of the test series due to an injury, with Abhimanyu Easwaran named as replacement.

For the second Test, Zubayr Hamza replaced injured Temba Bavuma in South Africa's squad, with Dean Elgar named captain for the match.

On 29 December 2023, Avesh Khan was added to India's squad for the second Test.

On 30 December 2023, South Africa's Gerald Coetzee was ruled out of the second Test due to an injury.

== T20I Series ==
=== 1st T20I ===
10 December 2023
16:00 (D/N)
Scorecard

South Africa	v	India

Match abandoned
Kingsmead Cricket Ground, Durban
Umpires: Stephen Harris (SA) and Bongani Jele (SA)

- No toss.
- No play was possible due to rain.

=== 2nd T20I ===
12 December 2023
17:00 (D/N)
Scorecard

India; 180/7 (19.3 overs)	v	South Africa; 154/5 (13.5 overs)
Rinku Singh 68* (39); Gerald Coetzee 3/32 (3.3 overs)		Reeza Hendricks 49 (27); Mukesh Kumar 2/34 (3 overs)

South Africa won by 5 wickets (DLS method)
St George's Park Cricket Ground, Gqeberha
Umpires: Lubabalo Gcuma (SA) and Allahuddien Paleker (SA)
Player of the match: Tabraiz Shamsi (SA)

- South Africa won the toss and elected to field.
- South Africa were set a revised target of 152 runs in 15 overs due to rain.
- Suryakumar Yadav (Ind) scored his 2,000th run in T20Is.

=== 3rd T20I ===
14 December 2023
17:00 (D/N)
Scorecard

India; 201/7 (20 overs)	v	South Africa; 95 (13.5 overs)
Suryakumar Yadav 100 (56); Keshav Maharaj 2/26 (4 overs)		David Miller 35 (25); Kuldeep Yadav 5/17 (2.5 overs)

India won by 106 runs
Wanderers Stadium, Johannesburg
Umpires: Bongani Jele (SA) and Allahuddien Paleker (SA)
Player of the match: Suryakumar Yadav (Ind)

- South Africa won the toss and elected to field.
- Nandre Burger (SA) made his T20I debut.
- Suryakumar Yadav (Ind) became the joint-highest century scorer in T20Is (4).

== ODI Series ==
=== 1st ODI ===
17 December 2023
10:00
Scorecard

South Africa; 116 (27.3 overs)	v	India; 117/2 (16.4 overs)
Andile Phehlukwayo 33 (49); Arshdeep Singh 5/37 (10 overs)		Sai Sudharsan 55* (43); Andile Phehlukwayo 1/15 (1 over)

India won by 8 wickets
Wanderers Stadium, Johannesburg
Umpires: Bongani Jele (SA) and Richard Kettleborough (Eng)
Player of the match: Arshdeep Singh (Ind)

- South Africa won the toss and elected to bat.
- Nandre Burger (SA) and Sai Sudharsan (Ind) both made their ODI debuts.
- Arshdeep Singh (Ind) took his first five-wicket haul in ODIs.
- It was South Africa's lowest ODI total at home.

=== 2nd ODI ===
19 December 2023
13:00 (D/N)
Scorecard

India; 211 (46.2 overs)	v	South Africa; 215/2 (42.3 overs)
Sai Sudharsan 62 (83); Nandre Burger 3/30 (10 overs)		Tony de Zorzi 119* (122); Rinku Singh 1/2 (1 over)

South Africa won by 8 wickets
St George's Park Cricket Ground, Gqeberha
Umpires: Bongani Jele (SA) and Ahsan Raza (Pak)
Player of the match: Tony de Zorzi (SA)

- South Africa won the toss and elected to field.
- Rinku Singh (Ind) made his ODI debut.
- Tony de Zorzi (SA) scored his first century in ODIs.

=== 3rd ODI ===
21 December 2023
13:00 (D/N)
Scorecard

India; 296/8 (50 overs)	v	South Africa; 218 (45.5 overs)
Sanju Samson 108 (114); Beuran Hendricks 3/63 (9 overs)		Tony de Zorzi 81 (87); Arshdeep Singh 4/30 (9 overs)

India won by 78 runs
Boland Park, Paarl
Umpires: Ahsan Raza (Pak) and Allahuddien Paleker (SA)
Player of the match: Sanju Samson (Ind)

- South Africa won the toss and elected to field.
- Rajat Patidar (Ind) made his ODI debut.
- Sanju Samson (Ind) scored his maiden century in ODIs.

== Test Series ==
=== 1st Test ===
26–29 December 2023
Scorecard

India	v	South Africa
245 (67.4 overs); KL Rahul 101 (137); Kagiso Rabada 5/59 (20 overs)		408 (108.4 overs); Dean Elgar 185 (287); Jasprit Bumrah 4/69 (26.4 overs)
131 (34.1 overs); Virat Kohli 76 (82); Nandre Burger 4/33 (10 overs)

South Africa won by an innings and 32 runs
Centurion Park, Centurion
Umpires: Paul Reiffel (Aus) and Langton Rusere (Zim)
Player of the match: Dean Elgar (SA)

- South Africa won the toss and elected to field.
- David Bedingham, Nandre Burger (SA) and Prasidh Krishna (Ind) all made their Test debuts.
- World Test Championship points: South Africa 12, India –2

=== 2nd Test ===
3–4 January 2024
Scorecard

South Africa	v	India
55 (23.2 overs); Kyle Verreynne 15 (30); Mohammed Siraj 6/15 (9 overs)		153 (34.5 overs); Virat Kohli 46 (59); Lungi Ngidi 3/30 (6 overs)
176 (36.5 overs); Aiden Markram 106 (103); Jasprit Bumrah 6/61 (13.5 overs)		80/3 (12 overs); Yashasvi Jaiswal 28 (23); Marco Jansen 1/15 (2 overs)

India won by 7 wickets
Newlands Cricket Ground, Cape Town
Umpires: Ahsan Raza (Pak) and Langton Rusere (Zim)
Player of the match: Mohammed Siraj (Ind)

- South Africa won the toss and elected to bat.
- Tristan Stubbs (SA) made his Test debut. He became the first player since Harry Butt in 1896 to be dismissed twice on the first day of his Test debut.
- Dean Elgar (SA) played in his last Test. He became the first player since Jack Barrett in 1890 to be dismissed twice on the same day in his final Test match.
- South Africa's first innings total of 55 was the fewest runs India have conceded in a completed innings of a Test match.
- Shubman Gill (Ind) scored his 1,000th run in Tests.
- This was the shortest Test in terms of balls bowled to end in a result (642).
- This was India's first ever Test win at the venue.
- World Test Championship points: India 12, South Africa 0
