= List of New Zealand cricketers who have taken five-wicket hauls on Test debut =

List of cricketers

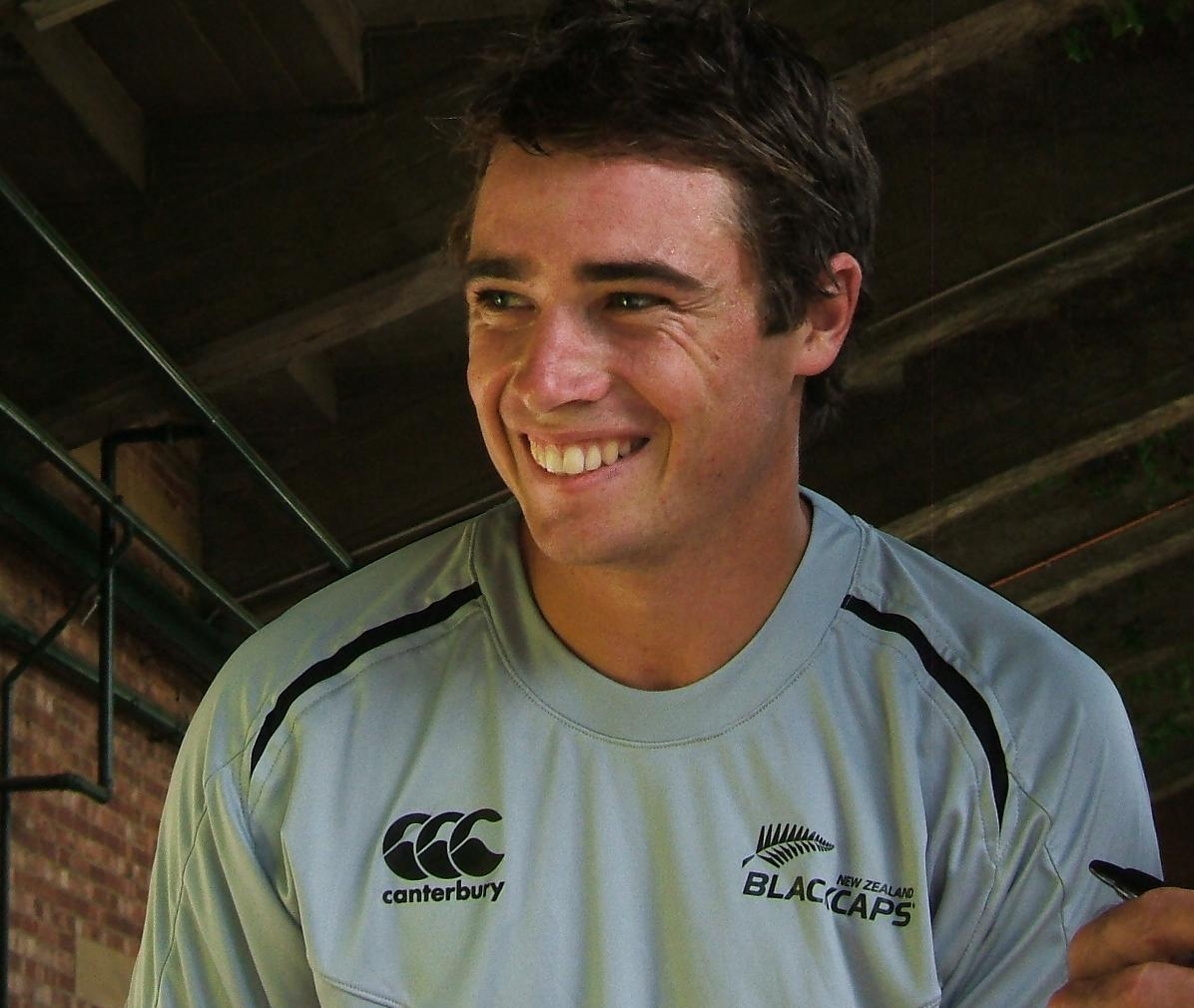
Tim Southee took a five-wicket haul on Test debut, against England in 2008.

In cricket, a five-wicket haul (also known as a "five–for" or "fifer") refers to a bowler taking five or more wickets in a single innings. This is regarded as a notable achievement. As of November 2026, 181 cricketers have taken a five-wicket haul on their debut in a Test match, with 11 of them being taken by New Zealand cricketers. They have taken a five-wicket haul on debut against six different opponents: three times against England, twice each against Pakistan, South Africa and Zimbabwe, and once each against India and Sri Lanka. Of the nine occasions, New Zealand won the match four times, drew three times, and lost twice. The players have taken five-wicket hauls at nine different venues, including six outside New Zealand; the most recent was taken at Sheikh Zayed Cricket Stadium, Abu Dhabi.

The first New Zealand player to take a five-wicket haul on Test debut was Fen Cresswell who took six wickets for 168 runs against England in 1949. Cresswell, Alex Moir and Colin de Grandhomme are the only bowlers to have taken six wickets each on debut. Eight other players have taken five wickets on their Test debut. De Grandhomme took six wickets for 41 runs, the best bowling figures by a New Zealand bowler in an innings on Test debut, against Pakistan in 2016, at Hagley Oval. Zak Foulkes accumulated 9 wickets for 75 runs in the match, the best bowling figures by a New Zealander in a Test match on debut. De Grandhomme and Ajaz Patel are the only players to get the man of the match award on their Test debuts. Amongst the bowlers, Bruce Taylor is the only player "to achieve the all-round feat" on his Test debut against India in 1964–65 at Eden Gardens, Calcutta; (Note: Calcutta was renamed as Kolkata in 2001.) he scored 105 runs and took 5 wickets for 86 runs. Paul Wiseman's five-wicket haul is the most economical, with 1.75 runs per over, and Foulkes has the best strike rate. (Note: In cricket, strike rate is referred to the average number of deliveries bowled before a bowler takes a wicket.) As of August 2025, the most recent Zealand cricketer to achieve this feat was Foulkes. Moir, Wiseman and Patel are the only spin bowlers to achieve this feat, the others being fast bowlers.

== Key ==
| Symbol | Meaning |
|---|---|
| Date | Date the match was held, or starting date of the match for Test matches |
| Inn | The innings of the match in which the five-wicket haul was taken |
| Overs | Number of overs bowled in that innings |
| Runs | Runs conceded |
| Wkts | Number of wickets taken |
| Econ | Bowling economy rate (average runs per over) |
| Batsmen | The batsmen whose wickets were taken in the five-wicket haul |
| Result | The result for the New Zealand team in that match |
| † | Bowler selected as the man of the match |

== Five-wicket hauls ==
Five-wicket hauls on Test debut by New Zealand bowlers
| No. | Bowler | Date | Ground | Against | Inn | Overs | Runs | Wkts | Econ | Batsmen | Result |
|---|---|---|---|---|---|---|---|---|---|---|---|
| 1 | Fen Cresswell | 13 August 1949 | The Oval, London | England | 2 | 41.2 | 168 | 6 | 4.06 | Len Hutton; Reg Simpson; Bill Edrich; Denis Compton; Freddie Brown; Doug Wright | Drawn |
| 2 | Alex Moir | 17 March 1951 | Lancaster Park, Christchurch | England | 2 | 56.3 | 155 | 6 | 2.74 | Len Hutton; Reg Simpson; Godfrey Evans; Alec Bedser; Roy Tattersall; Brian Statham | Drawn |
| 3 | Bruce Taylor | 5 March 1965 | Eden Gardens, Calcutta | India | 2 | 23.5 | 86 | 5 | 3.60 | Farokh Engineer; Chandu Borde; Bapu Nadkarni; Mansoor Ali Khan Pataudi; Srinivasaraghavan Venkataraghavan | Drawn |
| 4 | Paul Wiseman | 27 May 1998 | R. Premadasa Stadium, Colombo | Sri Lanka | 4 | 46.5 | 82 | 5 | 1.75 | Sanath Jayasuriya; Marvan Atapattu; Mahela Jayawardene; Niroshan Bandaratilleke; Malinga Bandara | Won |
| 5 | Mark Gillespie | 16 November 2007 | Centurion Park, Centurion | South Africa | 2 | 30.0 | 136 | 5 | 4.53 | Jacques Kallis; Ashwell Prince; AB de Villiers; Mark Boucher; Paul Harris | Lost |
| 6 | Tim Southee | 22 March 2008 | McLean Park, Napier | England | 1 | 23.1 | 55 | 5 | 2.37 | Michael Vaughan; Andrew Strauss; Kevin Pietersen; Stuart Broad; Ryan Sidebottom | Lost |
| 7 | Doug Bracewell | 1 November 2011 | Queens Sports Club, Bulawayo | Zimbabwe | 4 | 25.0 | 85 | 5 | 3.40 | Vusi Sibanda; Hamilton Masakadza; Regis Chakabva; Njabulo Ncube; Ray Price | Won |
| 8 | Colin de Grandhomme† | 17 November 2016 | Hagley Oval, Christchurch | Pakistan | 1 | 15.5 | 41 | 6 | 2.68 | Azhar Ali; Babar Azam; Younis Khan; Asad Shafiq; Sohail Khan; Rahat Ali | Won |
| 9 | Ajaz Patel† | 16 November 2018 | Sheikh Zayed Cricket Stadium, Abu Dhabi | Pakistan | 4 | 23.4 | 59 | 5 | 2.49 | Imam-ul-Haq; Sarfraz Ahmed; Bilal Asif; Hasan Ali; Azhar Ali | Won |
| 10 | William O'Rourke | 13 February 2024 | Seddon Park, Hamilton | South Africa | 3 | 13.5 | 34 | 5 | 2.45 | Raynard van Tonder; Neil Brand; David Bedingham; Shaun von Berg; Dane Piedt | Won |
| 11 | Zak Foulkes | 7 August 2025 | Queens Sports Club, Bulawayo | Zimbabwe | 3 | 9 | 37 | 5 | 4.11 | Sikandar Raza; Tafadzwa Tsiga; Vincent Masekesa; Trevor Gwandu; Blessing Muzarabani | Won |
