= South Africa A cricket team in Sri Lanka in 2023 =

International cricket tour

	Sri Lanka A	South Africa A
- Dates: 4 – 22 June 2023
Captains	Nipun Dananjaya	Tony de Zorzi

FC series
- Result: Sri Lanka A won the 2-match series 1–0
Most runs	Ramesh Mendis (186)	Tristan Stubbs (129)
Most wickets	Lakshitha Manasinghe (12)	Senuran Muthusamy (18)

LA series
- Result: South Africa A won the 3-match series 2–1
Most runs	Nishan Madushka (176)	Tristan Stubbs (117)
Most wickets	Dilshan Madushanka (9)	Gerald Coetzee (5)

The South Africa A cricket team toured Sri Lanka in June 2023 to play the Sri Lanka A cricket team. The tour consisted of three List A and two first-class matches. In April 2023, Sri Lanka Cricket (SLC) confirmed the full itinerary for the tour, with South Africa A arriving in Sri Lanka on 1 June 2023. The first-class series was used by South Africa as preparation ahead of their Test series against India.

== Squads ==
List A		First-class	
Sri Lanka A	South Africa A	Sri Lanka A	South Africa A
Nipun Dananjaya (c); Sahan Arachchige; Ashen Bandara; Lasith Croospulle; Nuwanidu Fernando; Janith Liyanage; Pramod Madushan; Dilshan Madushanka; Nishan Madushka (wk); Milan Rathnayake; Lahiru Samarakoon; Lakshan Sandakan; Lahiru Udara (wk); Nimesh Vimukthi; Dunith Wellalage; Isitha Wijesundera	Tony de Zorzi (c); Corbin Bosch; Matthew Breetzke; Dewald Brevis; Gerald Coetzee; Zubayr Hamza; Jordan Hermann; Tshepo Moreki; Senuran Muthusamy; Keegan Petersen; Sinethemba Qeshile (wk); Lutho Sipamla; Tristan Stubbs (wk); Beyers Swanepoel; Kyle Verreynne (wk); Lizaad Williams	Nipun Dananjaya (c); Kamindu Mendis (vc); Minod Bhanuka (wk); Lasith Croospulle; Lasith Embuldeniya; Nuwanidu Fernando; ~~Vishwa Fernando~~; Praveen Jayawickrama; Janith Liyanage; Nishan Madushka; Dilshan Madushanka; Ramesh Mendis; Lakshitha Rasanjana; Milan Rathnayake; Pasindu Sooriyabandara; Lahiru Udara (wk)	Tony de Zorzi (c); Corbin Bosch; Matthew Breetzke; Dewald Brevis; Gerald Coetzee; Zubayr Hamza; Jordan Hermann; Tshepo Moreki; Senuran Muthusamy; Keegan Petersen; Sinethemba Qeshile (wk); Lutho Sipamla; Tristan Stubbs (wk); Beyers Swanepoel; Kyle Verreynne (wk); Lizaad Williams

== List A series ==
=== 1st Unofficial ODI ===
4 June 2023
10:00
Scorecard

Sri Lanka A 264/8 (50 overs)	v	South Africa A 268/6 (41.1 overs)
Janith Liyanage 76* (79); Lutho Sipamla 3/33 (8 overs)		Dewald Brevis 98* (71); Dilshan Madushanka 2/44 (6 overs)

South Africa A won by 4 wickets
Pallekele International Cricket Stadium, Kandy
Umpires: Ranmore Martinesz (SL) and Chamara de Soysa (SL)

- Sri Lanka A won the toss and elected to bat.

=== 2nd Unofficial ODI ===
6 June 2023
10:00
Scorecard

South Africa A 175 (43.2 overs)	v	Sri Lanka A 178/3 (29 overs)
Gerald Coetzee 77 (89); Dilshan Madushanka 4/33 (9 overs)		Nishan Madushka 107* (85); Lizaad Williams 1/25 (5 overs)

Sri Lanka A won by 7 wickets
Pallekele International Cricket Stadium, Kandy
Umpires: Chamara de Soysa (SL) and Ravindra Kottahachchi (SL)

- South Africa A won the toss and elected to bat.

=== 3rd Unofficial ODI ===
8 June 2023
10:00
Scorecard

Sri Lanka A 172 (42.3 overs)	v	South Africa A 175/5 (35.5 overs)
Sahan Arachchige 63 (105); Gerald Coetzee 5/48 (8.3 overs)		Tristan Stubbs 58* (93); Dilshan Madushanka 3/34 (8 overs)

South Africa A won by 5 wickets
Pallekele International Cricket Stadium, Kandy
Umpires: Chandrika Amarasinghe (SL) and Ravindra Kottahachchi (SL)

- South Africa A won the toss and elected to field.

== First-class series ==
=== 1st Unofficial Test ===
12–15 June 2023
Scorecard

Sri Lanka A	v	South Africa A
325 (83 overs); Lasith Croospulle 98 (119); Senuran Muthusamy 7/122 (31 overs)		131 (40 overs); Matthew Breetzke 59 (93); Lakshitha Manasinghe 5/19 (10 overs)
151 (38.4 overs); Ramesh Mendis 46 (63); Senuran Muthusamy 5/53 (16.4 overs)		185 (50 overs); Senuran Muthusamy 29 (38); Lasith Embuldeniya 2/36 (13 overs)

Sri Lanka A won by 160 runs
Rangiri Dambulla International Stadium, Dambulla
Umpires: Ruchira Palliyaguruge (SL) and Prageeth Rambukwella (SL)

- Sri Lanka A won the toss and elected to bat.
- Kwena Maphaka (South Africa A) made his first-class debut.

=== 2nd Unofficial Test ===
19–22 June 2023
Scorecard

Sri Lanka A	v	South Africa A
290 (75.1 overs); Ramesh Mendis 62 (123); Senuran Muthusamy 6/101 (26.1 overs)		294 (84.3 overs); Tristan Stubbs 117 (181); Lakshitha Manasinghe 5/48 (16.3 overs)
327/3d (83.1 overs); Minod Bhanuka 130 (207); Tshepo Moreki 1/33 (13 overs)		156/4 (60 overs); Matthew Breetzke 38 (108); Praveen Jayawickrama 2/43 (18 overs)

Match drawn
Rangiri Dambulla International Stadium, Dambulla
Umpires: Lyndon Hannibal (SL) and Prageeth Rambukwella (SL)

- Sri Lanka A won the toss and elected to bat.
