= Indian cricket team in South Africa in 2021–22 =

International cricket tour

	South Africa	India
- Dates: 26 December 2021 – 23 January 2022
Captains	Dean Elgar (Tests); Temba Bavuma (ODIs)	Virat Kohli (Note: KL Rahul captained India for the second Test.) (Tests); KL Rahul (ODIs)

Test series
- Result: South Africa won the 3-match series 2–1
Most runs	Keegan Petersen (276)	KL Rahul (226)
Most wickets	Kagiso Rabada (20)	Mohammed Shami (14)
- Player of the series: Keegan Petersen (SA)

One Day International series
- Results: South Africa won the 3-match series 3–0
Most runs	Quinton de Kock (229)	Shikhar Dhawan (169)
Most wickets	Andile Phehlukwayo (6)	Jasprit Bumrah (5)
- Player of the series: Quinton de Kock (SA)

The India cricket team toured South Africa from December 2021 and January 2022 to play three Tests and three One Day International (ODI) matches. The Test matches formed part of the 2021–2023 ICC World Test Championship.

India won the first Test by 113 runs, to win their first-ever Test match at Centurion Park. It was also Quinton de Kock's final Test match, after he announced his retirement from Test cricket with immediate effect following the conclusion of the match. South Africa won the second Test by seven wickets to level the series. It was the first time that South Africa had beaten India in a Test match at the Wanderers Stadium. South Africa won the third and final Test, also by seven wickets, to win the series 2–1. The day after the end of the third match, Virat Kohli announced that he had stepped down as India's captain in Test cricket.

South Africa won the first ODI match by 31 runs, with an unbeaten century by Rassie van der Dussen. South Africa won the second ODI by seven wickets to win the series with a match to spare. South Africa won the final ODI by four runs, winning the series 3–0.

== Background ==
In November 2021, Cricket South Africa confirmed that due to restrictions in Johannesburg, the third Test had been moved from the Wanderers Stadium to the Newlands Cricket Ground. Due to a new variant of COVID-19 detected in Southern Africa, a Board of Control for Cricket in India (BCCI) official stated that it would re-evaluating whether the series will be held once they "get a detailed picture of the ground situation from Cricket South Africa." On 2 December 2021, India's Test captain Virat Kohli said that the team would have "absolute clarity" regarding the tour in "a day or two or pretty soon". On 4 December 2021, both boards agreed to a new tour schedule, starting slightly later than originally planned. On 6 December 2021, the new tour schedule was confirmed. The tour was also scheduled to include four Twenty20 International (T20I) matches, but these were postponed, with Cricket South Africa saying these would be "rescheduled for a more opportune time". On 20 December 2021, both cricket boards agreed to play the tour behind closed doors, following an increase in COVID-19 cases.

== Squads ==
Tests		ODIs	
South Africa	India	South Africa	India
Dean Elgar (c); Temba Bavuma (vc); Quinton de Kock (wk); Sarel Erwee; Beuran Hendricks; Marco Jansen; George Linde; Sisanda Magala; Keshav Maharaj; Aiden Markram; Wiaan Mulder; Lungi Ngidi; ~~Anrich Nortje~~; Duanne Olivier; Keegan Petersen; Kagiso Rabada; Ryan Rickelton; Prenelan Subrayen; Glenton Stuurman; Rassie van der Dussen; Kyle Verreynne (wk)	Virat Kohli (c); KL Rahul (vc); ~~Rohit Sharma (vc)~~; Mayank Agarwal; Ravichandran Ashwin; Jasprit Bumrah; Shreyas Iyer; Priyank Panchal; Rishabh Pant (wk); Cheteshwar Pujara; Ajinkya Rahane; Wriddhiman Saha (wk); Mohammed Shami; Ishant Sharma; Mohammed Siraj; Shardul Thakur; Hanuma Vihari; Jayant Yadav; Umesh Yadav	Temba Bavuma (c); Keshav Maharaj (vc); Quinton de Kock (wk); Zubayr Hamza; Marco Jansen; George Linde; Janneman Malan; Sisanda Magala; Aiden Markram; David Miller; Lungi Ngidi; Wayne Parnell; Andile Phehlukwayo; Dwaine Pretorius; ~~Kagiso Rabada~~; Tabraiz Shamsi; Rassie van der Dussen; Kyle Verreynne	KL Rahul (c); Jasprit Bumrah (vc); Ravichandran Ashwin; Yuzvendra Chahal; Deepak Chahar; Shikhar Dhawan; Ruturaj Gaikwad; Shreyas Iyer; Venkatesh Iyer; Ishan Kishan (wk); Virat Kohli; Prasidh Krishna; Bhuvneshwar Kumar; Rishabh Pant (wk); Navdeep Saini; Mohammed Siraj; ~~Washington Sundar~~; Shardul Thakur; Jayant Yadav; Suryakumar Yadav

In December 2021, it was announced that South Africa's Quinton de Kock would miss at least the third Test of the tour due to him taking paternity leave. Anrich Nortje was ruled out of South Africa's squad for the Test series due to a hip injury. On 30 December 2021, Quinton de Kock announced his retirement from Test cricket with immediate effect, ruling him out of the second and third Tests. On 2 January 2022, Cricket South Africa announced a 17-member squad for the ODI series, with Marco Jansen receiving his maiden ODI call-up. Kagiso Rabada was released from South Africa's ODI squad to manage his workload, with George Linde being retained from their Test squad for the ODI series.

India also named Navdeep Saini, Saurabh Kumar, Deepak Chahar and Arzan Nagwaswalla as standby players in their Test squad. Rohit Sharma was ruled out of India's squad for the Test matches due to an injury, with Priyank Panchal named as his replacement. On 18 December 2021, KL Rahul was named as the vice-captain of India's Test squad for the series, replacing Rohit Sharma. Ahead of the tour, Rohit Sharma was named as the captain of India's ODI squad, replacing Virat Kohli. On 31 December 2021, India's ODI squad was announced with Rohit Sharma ruled out of the series. KL Rahul was named as the ODI captain for the series. Ahead of the ODI series, Washington Sundar was ruled out of India's squad following a positive test for COVID-19, with Jayant Yadav named as his replacement. Navdeep Saini was also added to India's ODI squad, as cover for Mohammed Siraj.

== Test series ==
=== 1st Test ===
26–30 December 2021
Scorecard

India	v	South Africa
327 (105.3 overs); KL Rahul 123 (260); Lungi Ngidi 6/71 (24 overs)		197 (62.3 overs); Temba Bavuma 52 (103); Mohammed Shami 5/44 (16 overs)
174 (50.3 overs); Rishabh Pant 34 (34); Kagiso Rabada 4/42 (17 overs)		191 (68 overs); Dean Elgar 77 (156); Jasprit Bumrah 3/50 (19 overs)

India won by 113 runs
Centurion Park, Centurion
Umpires: Marais Erasmus (SA) and Adrian Holdstock (SA)
Player of the match: KL Rahul (Ind)

- India won the toss and elected to bat.
- No play was possible on day 2 due to rain.
- Marco Jansen (SA) made his Test debut.
- Rishabh Pant became the fastest wicket-keeper for India, in terms of innings, to effect 100 dismissals in Tests (50).
- Mohammed Shami (Ind) took his 200th wicket in Tests.
- World Test Championship points: India 11, South Africa 0. (Note: India were deducted one WTC point for a slow over-rate while bowling.)

=== 2nd Test ===
3–7 January 2022 (Note: While five days of play were scheduled for each Test, the second and third Tests reached a result in four days.)
Scorecard

India	v	South Africa
202 (63.1 overs); KL Rahul 50 (133); Marco Jansen 4/31 (17 overs)		229 (79.4 overs); Keegan Petersen 62 (118); Shardul Thakur 7/61 (17.5 overs)
266 (60.1 overs); Ajinkya Rahane 58 (78); Lungi Ngidi 3/43 (10.1 overs)		243/3 (67.4 overs); Dean Elgar 96* (188); Ravichandran Ashwin 1/26 (11.4 overs)

South Africa won by 7 wickets
Wanderers Stadium, Johannesburg
Umpires: Marais Erasmus (SA) and Allahudien Paleker (SA)
Player of the match: Dean Elgar (SA)

- India won the toss and elected to bat.
- No play was possible before tea on day 4 due to rain.
- KL Rahul (Ind) captained India for the first time in Tests.
- Allahudien Paleker (SA) stood in his first Test as umpire.
- Duanne Olivier (SA) took his 50th Test wicket.
- Shardul Thakur (Ind) took his first five-wicket haul in Tests.
- World Test Championship points: South Africa 12, India 0.

=== 3rd Test ===
11–15 January 2022
Scorecard

India	v	South Africa
223 (77.3 overs); Virat Kohli 79 (201); Kagiso Rabada 4/73 (22 overs)		210 (76.3 overs); Keegan Petersen 72 (166); Jasprit Bumrah 5/42 (23.3 overs)
198 (67.3 overs); Rishabh Pant 100* (139); Marco Jansen 4/36 (19.3 overs)		212/3 (63.3 overs); Keegan Petersen 82 (113); Shardul Thakur 1/22 (11 overs)

South Africa won by 7 wickets
Newlands Cricket Ground, Cape Town
Umpires: Marais Erasmus (SA) and Adrian Holdstock (SA)
Player of the match: Keegan Petersen (SA)

- India won the toss and elected to bat.
- Kagiso Rabada (SA) played in his 50th Test.
- Virat Kohli (Ind) took his 100th catch in Tests.
- South Africa's fielders took twenty catches in the match, the first time in Test cricket that one team were dismissed twice by being caught.
- World Test Championship points: South Africa 12, India 0.

== ODI series ==
=== 1st ODI ===
19 January 2022
10:30
Scorecard

South Africa; 296/4 (50 overs)	v	India; 265/8 (50 overs)
Rassie van der Dussen 129* (96); Jasprit Bumrah 2/48 (10 overs)		Shikhar Dhawan 79 (84); Andile Phehlukwayo 2/26 (5 overs)

South Africa won by 31 runs
Boland Park, Paarl
Umpires: Marais Erasmus (SA) and Allahudien Paleker (SA)
Player of the match: Rassie van der Dussen (SA)

- South Africa won the toss and elected to bat.
- KL Rahul (Ind) captained India for the first time in ODIs.
- Marco Jansen (SA) and Venkatesh Iyer (Ind) both made their ODI debuts.
- Marais Erasmus (SA) officiated in his 100th ODI as an on-field umpire.

=== 2nd ODI ===
21 January 2022
10:30
Scorecard

India; 287/6 (50 overs)	v	South Africa; 288/3 (48.1 overs)
Rishabh Pant 85 (71); Tabraiz Shamsi 2/57 (9 overs)		Janneman Malan 91 (108); Shardul Thakur 1/35 (5 overs)

South Africa won by 7 wickets
Boland Park, Paarl
Umpires: Marais Erasmus (SA) and Adrian Holdstock (SA)
Player of the match: Quinton de Kock (SA)

- India won the toss and elected to bat.

=== 3rd ODI ===
23 January 2022
10:30
Scorecard

South Africa; 287 (49.5 overs)	v	India; 283 (49.2 overs)
Quinton de Kock 124 (130); Prasidh Krishna 3/59 (9.5 overs)		Virat Kohli 65 (84); Andile Phehlukwayo 3/40 (7 overs)

South Africa won by 4 runs
Newlands Cricket Ground, Cape Town
Umpires: Marais Erasmus (SA) and Bongani Jele (SA)
Player of the match: Quinton de Kock (SA)

- India won the toss and elected to field.
