= Tangiwai Shield =

Test cricket series between New Zealand and South Africa

- The Tangiwai Shield, the series trophy for New Zealand vs South Africa Tests
- Countries: New Zealand; South Africa
- Administrator: International Cricket Council; New Zealand Cricket; Cricket South Africa
- Format: Test cricket
- First edition: 2023–24 (New Zealand)
- Tournament format: Test series
- Number of teams: 2
- Current trophy holder: New Zealand (1st)
- Most successful: New Zealand (1)
- Qualification: ICC World Test Championship
- Most runs: (New Zealand) Kane Williamson (403)
- Most wickets: (New Zealand) William O'Rourke (9)

The Tangiwai Shield is a Test cricket series played between the men's cricket teams of New Zealand and South Africa. It was launched in February 2024 during South Africa's tour of New Zealand.

The trophy commemorates the tragic events of 1953, when 151 people on the train from Wellington to Auckland on Christmas Eve - including Nerissa Love, the fiancé of New Zealand fast bowler Bob Blair - lost their lives in the rail disaster. The disaster coincided with the second Test between New Zealand and South Africa, where Bob Blair was playing the match.

== Background ==
=== Test series and one-off encounters not under the trophy ===
Years	Host	Tests	New Zealand	South Africa	Drawn	Series Winner
1931–32	New Zealand	2	0	2	0	South Africa
1952–53	New Zealand	2	0	1	1	South Africa
1953–54	South Africa	5	0	4	1	South Africa
1961–62	South Africa	5	2	2	1	Draw
1963–64	New Zealand	3	0	0	3	Draw
1994–95	South Africa	3	1	2	0	South Africa
1994–95	New Zealand	1	0	1	0	South Africa
1998–99	New Zealand	3	0	1	2	South Africa
2000–01	South Africa	3	0	2	1	South Africa
2003–04	New Zealand	3	1	1	1	Draw
2005–06	South Africa	3	0	2	1	South Africa
2007–08	South Africa	2	0	2	0	South Africa
2011–12	New Zealand	3	0	1	2	South Africa
2012–13	South Africa	2	0	2	0	South Africa
2016	South Africa	2	0	1	1	South Africa
2016–17	New Zealand	3	0	1	2	South Africa
2021–22	New Zealand	2	1	1	0	Draw

== List of Tangiwai Shield series ==
Years	Host	Tests	New Zealand	South Africa	Drawn	Player of the Series	Series Winner	Holder at series end
2023–24	New Zealand	2	2	0	0	(New Zealand) Kane Williamson	New Zealand	New Zealand

Total Series	New Zealand won	South Africa won	Drawn
1	1	0	0

== See also ==
- Freedom Cup (the rugby union equivalent)
