= Wandile Makwetu =

South African cricketer

Personal information
- Born: 7 January 1999 (age 27)
- Source: Cricinfo, 1 March 2018

Wandile Makwetu (born 7 January 1999) is a South African cricketer. He made his first-class debut for Northerns Districts in the 2017–18 Sunfoil 3-Day Cup on 1 March 2018. Prior to his first-class debut, he was named in South Africa's squad for the 2018 Under-19 Cricket World Cup.

Makwetu made his List A debut for Northerns in the 2017–18 CSA Provincial One-Day Challenge on 4 March 2018.

In June 2018, Makwetu was named in the squad for the Titans team for the 2018–19 season. In August 2018, he was awarded a senior contract by Cricket South Africa ahead of the 2018–19 domestic season. In December 2019, in the 2019–20 CSA 4-Day Franchise Series, he scored his maiden first-class century.

In April 2021, Makwetu was named in the South Africa Emerging Men's squad for their six-match tour of Namibia. Later the same month, he was named in Free State's squad, ahead of the 2021–22 cricket season in South Africa.
