= Jonathan Vandiar =

South African cricketer (born 1990)

Personal information
- Full name: Jonathan David Vandiar
- Born: 25 April 1990 (age 36); Paarl, Western Cape
- Batting: Left-handed
- Bowling: Legbreak
- Role: Batsman

Career statistics
Competition	FC	LA	T20
Matches	115	105	80
Runs scored	6423	3130	1,657
Batting average	37.56	32.26	23.01
100s/50s	11/37	7/17	1/10
Top score	172*	153	107*
Balls bowled	652	72	–
Wickets	5	3	–
Bowling average	84.80	30.33	–
5 wickets in innings	0	0	–
10 wickets in match	0	0	–
Best bowling	2/12	3/42	–
Catches/stumpings	58/–	26/–	12/–
- Source: ESPNcricinfo, 2 April 2025

Jonathan David Vandiar (born 25 April 1990) is a South African first-class cricketer who currently plays for the Titans Cricket Team. He played for Dolphins since 2007 season, but later opted a switch to the Highveld Lions Cricket Team, also representing South Africa at under-19 level. he was in the team that reached the 2008 under-19 World Cup Final against India and was the top run-scoring South African in the tournament.

Vandiar went on to represent South Africa A in various tours abroad and was selected in the preliminary squad for the cricket world cup. He was signed by Royal Challengers Bangalore for the 2011 Indian Premier League before moving back to the Dolphins in 2012 and later joining Titans in 2016. .

In August 2017, he was named in Jo'burg Giants' squad for the first season of the T20 Global League. However, in October 2017, Cricket South Africa initially postponed the tournament until November 2018, with it being cancelled soon after.

In June 2018, he was named in the squad for the Titans team for the 2018–19 season. He was the leading run-scorer for the Titans in the 2018–19 CSA 4-Day Franchise Series, with 449 runs in seven matches. In April 2021, he was named in Northern Cape's squad, ahead of the 2021–22 cricket season in South Africa.
