= Tony de Zorzi =

South African cricketer (born 1997)

Personal information
- Born: 28 August 1997 (age 29); Johannesburg, Gauteng, South Africa
- Height: 6 ft (183 cm)
- Batting: Left-handed
- Bowling: Right-arm Offbreak
- Role: Top-order batter

International information
- National side: South Africa (2023–present)
- Test debut (cap 356): 28 February 2023 v West Indies
- Last Test: 14 November 2025 v India
- ODI debut (cap 146): 18 March 2023 v West Indies
- Last ODI: 3 December 2025 v India
- ODI shirt no.: 33
- T20I debut (cap 114): 28 October 2025 v Pakistan
- Last T20I: 31 October 2025 v Pakistan

Domestic team information
- Years: Team
- 2016/17–2019/20: Northerns
- 2016/17–2019/20: Titans
- 2018: Durham
- 2018: Paarl Rocks
- 2019: Hampshire
- 2020/21–present: Western Province
- 2024: Durban's Super Giants
- 2025: Sunrisers Eastern Cape

Career statistics
Competition	Test	ODI	FC	LA
Matches	17	26	85	114
Runs scored	919	856	4,668	3,802
Batting average	30.63	38.90	35.36	38.02
100s/50s	2/3	1/4	10/20	6/22
Top score	177	119*	304*	143
Catches/stumpings	13/–	1/–	50/–	27/–
Medal record
Men's cricket
Representing South Africa
World Test Championship
Winner	2023–2025
- Source: ESPNcricinfo, 2 October 2026

Tony de Zorzi (born 28 August 1997) is a South African cricketer. He was included in the Northerns squad for the 2016 Africa T20 Cup. He made his Twenty20 (T20) debut for Northerns against Kenya on 16 September 2016. Prior to his T20 debut, he was named as captain of South Africa's squad for the 2016 Under-19 Cricket World Cup.

== Personal life ==
De Zorzi was born in Johannesburg on 28 August 1997. He was raised by his mother Natasha as a single parent. His mother is of Italian descent and his father is Nigerian.

De Zorzi attended King Edward VII School, Johannesburg. He later studied at the University of Pretoria.

== Domestic and franchise career ==
He made his first-class debut for Northerns in the 2016–17 Sunfoil 3-Day Cup on 28 October 2016. He made his List A debut for Northerns in the 2016–17 CSA Provincial One-Day Challenge on 31 October 2016.

In August 2017, he was named in Pretoria Mavericks' squad for the first season of the T20 Global League. However, in October 2017, Cricket South Africa initially postponed the tournament until November 2018, with it being cancelled soon after.

In January 2018, he scored his first century in List A cricket, batting for Titans against Knights in the 2017–18 Momentum One Day Cup. In June 2018, he was named in the squad for the Titans team for the 2018–19 season. The following month, he was named as the captain of the Cricket South Africa Emerging Squad.

In September 2018, he was named in the Titans' squad for the 2018 Abu Dhabi T20 Trophy. In October 2018, he was named in Tshwane Spartans' squad for the first edition of the Mzansi Super League T20 tournament. In September 2019, he was named in the squad for the Tshwane Spartans team for the 2019 Mzansi Super League tournament.

In January 2020, in the 2019–20 CSA 4-Day Franchise Series, he scored his maiden double century in first-class cricket, with an unbeaten 213 runs against Cape Cobras. In April 2021, he was named in Western Province's squad, ahead of the 2021–22 cricket season in South Africa.

== International career ==
In February 2023, he was selected in South Africa Test squad for the series against West Indies. He made his Test debut against West Indies on 28 February 2023. In March 2023, he was named in South Africa's One Day International (ODI) squad for their series against the West Indies. He made his ODI debut in the second ODI on 18 March 2023. In April 2023, he was named in South Africa A's squad as the captain for their tour to Sri Lanka.

In December 2023, he scored his maiden international century against India during the second One Day International match of the three-match ODI series that took place at St George's Park Cricket Ground. His knock of unbeaten 119 came in difficult pitch conditions during the course of the match which eventually helped South Africa to win the game and level the series 1–1.

De Zorzi made his first Test century against Bangladesh in October 2024.

He is one of the members of the winning squad of 2025 World Test Championship final.

In January 2026, de Zonzi was named in South Africa's squad for the 2026 T20 World Cup, but was later removed due to an injury.

== International centuries ==
Test centuries by Tony de Zorzi
No.	Runs	Balls	Innings	Against	Venue	Country	Date	Result
1	177	269	1	Bangladesh	Zahur Ahmed Chowdhury Stadium, Chittagong	Bangladesh	29 October 2024	South Africa won by an innings and 273 runs
2	104	171	2	Pakistan	Gaddafi Stadium, Lahore	Pakistan	12 October 2025	Pakistan won by 93 runs

ODI centuries by Tony de Zorzi
No.	Runs	Balls	Innings	Against	Venue	Country	Date	Result
1	119*	122	2	India	St George's Park, Gqeberha	South Africa	19 December 2023	South Africa won by 8 wickets
