= Eldred Hawken =

South African cricketer (born 1989)

Personal information
- Born: 2 May 1989 (age 37); Tzaneen, South Africa
- Source: ESPNcricinfo, 29 October 2016

Eldred Hawken (born 2 May 1989) is a South African cricketer. He made his first-class debut for Northerns in the 2012–13 CSA Provincial Three-Day Competition on 17 January 2013. In August 2017, he was named in Pretoria Mavericks' squad for the first season of the T20 Global League. However, in October 2017, Cricket South Africa initially postponed the tournament until November 2018, with it being cancelled soon after.

In June 2018, he was named in the squad for the Titans team for the 2018–19 season. In September 2018, he was named in the Titans' squad for the 2018 Abu Dhabi T20 Trophy. In October 2018, he was named in Tshwane Spartans' squad for the first edition of the Mzansi Super League T20 tournament. In April 2021, he was named in North West's squad, ahead of the 2021–22 cricket season in South Africa.

On 25 March 2022, in Division One of the 2021–22 CSA One-Day Cup, Hawken took his first five-wicket haul in List A cricket, with 6/46.
