= Cody Chetty =

South African cricketer (born 1991)

Personal information
- Born: 28 June 1991 (age 35); Durban, South Africa

Career statistics
Competition	FC	LA	T20
Matches	99	98	80
Runs scored	4,919	2,035	1,663
Batting average	36.16	27.50	27.71
100s/50s	10/24	1/15	0/9
Top score	142*	123	94*
Catches/stumpings	50/–	33/–	22/–
- Source: Cricinfo, 9 October 2020

Cody Chetty (born 28 June 1991) is a South African former first-class cricketer who played for the Dolphins cricket team. He played primarily as a middle-order batsman. In August 2017, he was named in Durban Qalandars' squad for the first season of the T20 Global League. However, in October 2017, Cricket South Africa initially postponed the tournament until November 2018, with it being cancelled soon after. In September 2018, he was named in KwaZulu-Natal Inland's squad for the 2018 Africa T20 Cup.

In October 2020, Chetty announced his retirement from cricket. However, in June 2021, Chetty was selected in the players' draft ahead of the Minor League Cricket tournament in the United States.

In March 2023, Chetty was drafted in Round 7 by the Texas Super Kings for the inaugural season of Major League Cricket.
