= Tshepo Moreki =

South African cricketer (born 1993)

Personal information
- Full name: Tshepo Lebohang Moreki
- Born: 7 October 1993 (age 33); Empangeni, Natal Province, South Africa
- Batting: Right-handed
- Bowling: Right-arm fast-medium
- Role: Bowler

International information
- National side: South Africa
- Test debut (cap 364): 4 February 2024 v New Zealand
- Last Test: 13 February 2024 v New Zealand

Career statistics
Competition	Test	FC	LA	T20
Matches	2	96	67	47
Runs scored	15	1,013	134	57
Batting average	7.50	12.20	10.30	5.70
100s/50s	0/0	0/2	0/0	0/0
Top score	6	57	19*	12*
Balls bowled	398	12,723	2,876	791
Wickets	2	201	91	46
Bowling average	101.00	37.52	30.34	24.52
5 wickets in innings	0	1	0	0
10 wickets in match	0	0	0	0
Best bowling	1/32	5/65	4/38	4/22
Catches/stumpings	1/–	31/–	12/–	7/–
- Source: ESPNcricinfo, 4 April 2024

Tshepo Lebohang Moreki (born 7 October 1993) is a South African cricketer. He was included in the Boland cricket team for the 2015 Africa T20 Cup.

In August 2017, he was named in Benoni Zalmi's squad for the first season of the T20 Global League. However, in October 2017, Cricket South Africa initially postponed the tournament until November 2018, with it being cancelled soon after.

In June 2018, he was named in the squad for the Titans team for the 2018–19 season. In September 2018, he was named in the Titans' squad for the 2018 Abu Dhabi T20 Trophy. In October 2018, he was named in Paarl Rocks' squad for the first edition of the Mzansi Super League T20 tournament. In October 2019, in the opening round of fixtures of the 2019–20 CSA 4-Day Franchise Series, Moreki took a hat-trick for Titans against Dolphins.

In April 2021, he was named in Western Province's squad, ahead of the 2021–22 cricket season in South Africa.

Moreki made his Test debut against New Zealand in February 2024, and became the 24th cricketer to take a wicket with his first ball in his first Test.
