= Simon Khomari =

South African cricketer (born 1991)

Personal information
- Born: 10 October 1991 (age 35); Bloemfontein, South Africa
- Batting: Left-handed
- Bowling: Left-arm spinner
- Role: Bowler
- Source: Cricinfo, 1 September 2015

Simon Khomari (born 10 October 1991) is a South African cricketer. He was included in the Boland cricket team squad for the 2015 Africa T20 Cup. In June 2018, he was named in the squad for the Cape Cobras team for the 2018–19 season. In September 2019, he was named in Boland's squad for the 2019–20 CSA Provincial T20 Cup.
