= Raynard van Tonder =

South African cricketer

Personal information
- Full name: Raynard van Tonder
- Born: 26 September 1998 (age 28); Bethlehem, Free State, South Africa
- Batting: Right-handed
- Bowling: Right-arm leg break
- Role: Middle-order batsman

International information
- National side: South Africa
- Test debut (cap 365): 4 February 2024 v New Zealand
- Last Test: 13 February 2024 v New Zealand

Domestic team information
- Years: Team
- 2016/17–present: Free State
- 2018/19–present: Knights

Career statistics
Competition	Test	FC	LA	T20
Matches	2	53	40	41
Runs scored	63	3,577	1,244	840
Batting average	21.00	41.59	35.54	26.25
100s/50s	0/0	7/19	1/12	0/2
Top score	32	250*	129*	81*
Catches/stumpings	0/–	30/–	17/–	9/–
- Source: ESPNcricinfo, 4 April 2024

Raynard van Tonder (born 26 September 1998) is a South African cricketer. He made his first-class debut for Free State in the 2016–17 Sunfoil 3-Day Cup on 6 October 2016. He made his List A debut for Free State in the 2016–17 CSA Provincial One-Day Challenge on 9 October 2016. He made his Twenty20 debut for Free State in the 2017 Africa T20 Cup on 8 September 2017.

In December 2017, Van Tonder was named as the captain of South Africa's squad for the 2018 Under-19 Cricket World Cup. He was the leading run-scorer for South Africa in the tournament, with 348 runs. Following South Africa's matches in the tournament, the International Cricket Council (ICC) named van Tonder as the rising star of the squad.

In July 2018, Van Tonder was named in the Cricket South Africa Emerging Squad. In October 2018, van Tonder scored 250 not out against Gauteng in the 2018–19 CSA 3-Day Provincial Cup. In September 2019, he was named in Free State's squad for the 2019–20 CSA Provincial T20 Cup. He was the leading run-scorer in the 2019–20 CSA 4-Day Franchise Series, with 843 runs in eight matches.

In December 2020, van Tonder was added to South Africa's Test squad for their series against Sri Lanka. In April 2021, he was named in Free State's squad, ahead of the 2021–22 cricket season in South Africa.

== International career ==
In February 2024, he made his test debut against New Zealand at Mount Maunganui. He was out for a duck in the first innings but scored 31 runs in the second innings.
