= Edward Moore (South African cricketer) =

South African cricketer (born 1993)

Personal information
- Full name: Edward Michael Moore
- Born: 17 March 1993 (age 33); Uitenhage, South Africa
- Batting: Left-handed
- Bowling: Right-arm off break
- Role: Batsman

International information
- National side: South Africa
- Only Test (cap 363): 4 February 2024 v New Zealand

Domestic team information
- Years: Team
- 2012–2022: Eastern Province
- 2023–present: Western Province
- 2012–2020: Warriors

Career statistics
Competition	Test	FC	LA	T20
Matches	1	128	58	57
Runs scored	23	7,837	2,338	1,437
Batting average	11.50	39.95	44.11	28.17
100s/50s	0/0	18/43	4/16	2/8
Top score	23	228	158	105
Balls bowled	–	526	725	42
Wickets	–	6	21	1
Bowling average	–	56.50	26.00	47.00
5 wickets in innings	–	0	0	0
10 wickets in match	–	0	0	0
Best bowling	–	2/16	3/48	1/23
Catches/stumpings	1/–	78/–	30/–	30/–
- Source: Cricinfo, 30 November 2025

Edward Michael Moore (born 17 March 1993) is a South African cricketer. He was included in the Eastern Province cricket team squad for the 2015 Africa T20 Cup.

He was the leading run-scorer in the 2017–18 CSA Provincial One-Day Challenge tournament for Eastern Province, with 331 runs in seven matches.

In September 2018, he was named in Eastern Province's squad for the 2018 Africa T20 Cup. He was the leading run-scorer for Eastern Province in the tournament, with 159 runs in four matches, He was also the leading run-scorer for Warriors in the 2018–19 CSA 4-Day Franchise Series, with 921 runs in ten matches. and he was also the leading run-scorer for Eastern Province in the 2018–19 CSA Provincial One-Day Challenge, with 260 runs in five matches. In April 2021, he was named in Eastern Province's squad, ahead of the 2021–22 cricket season in South Africa.
