= Marques Ackerman =

South African cricketer

- Ackerman with South Africa in 2026

Personal information
- Full name: Marques Jannie Ackerman
- Born: 1 March 1996 (age 30); Johannesburg, South Africa
- Batting: Left-handed
- Bowling: Right-arm off break
- Role: Batter

International information
- National side: South Africa (2026–present)
- Test debut (cap 375): 18–22 October 2026 v Australia
- Last Test: 18–22 October 2026 v Australia

Domestic team information
- Years: Team
- 2015/16–2017/18: North West
- 2017/18: Lions
- 2017/18–2018/19: KwaZulu-Natal
- 2018/19–2020/21: Dolphins
- 2019/20–present: KwaZulu-Natal Coastal
- 2019: Cape Town Blitz
- 2023: Sunrisers Eastern Cape
- 2026: Dambulla Sixers

Career statistics
Competition	Test	FC	LA	T20
Matches	3	88	74	80
Runs scored	320	6,306	1,826	1,589
Batting average	64.00	49.26	27.25	26.04
100s/50s	1/2	17/33	0/11	0/7
Top score	157	256	92	74
Balls bowled	0	879	444	120
Wickets	0	10	12	3
Bowling average	–	52.00	24.33	54.00
5 wickets in innings	0	0	0	0
10 wickets in match	0	0	0	0
Best bowling	–	3/14	4/26	2/27
Catches/stumpings	0/–	95/–	45/–	40/–
- Source: ESPNcricinfo, 19 November 2026

Marques Jannie Ackerman (born 1 March 1996) is a South African first-class cricketer. He was included in the North West squad for the 2016 Africa T20 Cup. In August 2017, he was named in Durban Qalandars' squad for the first season of the T20 Global League. However, in October 2017, Cricket South Africa initially postponed the tournament until November 2018, with it being cancelled soon after.

Ackerman batting in 2026

In September 2018, he was named in KwaZulu-Natal's squad for the 2018 Africa T20 Cup. He was the leading run-scorer for KwaZulu-Natal in the tournament, with 121 runs in four matches. He was also the leading run-scorer for KwaZulu-Natal in the 2018–19 CSA 3-Day Provincial Cup, with 439 runs in six matches.

In September 2019, he was named in the squad for the Cape Town Blitz team for the 2019 Mzansi Super League tournament. Later the same month, he was named in KwaZulu-Natal's squad for the 2019–20 CSA Provincial T20 Cup.

In April 2021, he was named in KwaZulu-Natal's squad, ahead of the 2021–22 cricket season in South Africa. In February 2022, Ackerman was named as the captain of the Dolphins for the 2021–22 CSA T20 Challenge.

In the spring of 2024, he was named in Chorley CC's squad ahead of the 2024 season in the Northern Premier League Division 1 and was the standout performer with the bat.

In October 2026 Ackermann made his debut for the South Africa men’s cricket team in a test match against Australia in Gqeberha.

On the 16th of November 2026, Ackerman scored his first international century in a test match against Bangladesh at Wanderers Stadium.

== International centuries ==
Test centuries by Marques Ackerman
No.	Runs	Balls	Innings	Against	Venue	Country	Date	Result
1	157	164	2	Bangladesh	Wanderers Stadium, Johannesburg	South Africa	15 November 2026	South Africa won by 9 wickets
