= Dane Piedt =

South African cricketer (born 1990)

Personal information
- Full name: Dane Leeroy Piedt
- Born: 6 March 1990 (age 36); Cape Town, Cape Province, South Africa
- Height: 5 ft 8 in (1.73 m)
- Batting: Right-handed
- Bowling: Right-arm off break
- Role: Bowler

International information
- National side: South Africa (2014–present)
- Test debut (cap 318): 9 August 2014 v Zimbabwe
- Last Test: 21 October 2024 v Bangladesh

Domestic team information
- Years: Team
- 2008/09–2017/18: Western Province
- 2010/11–2019/20: Cape Cobras
- 2016/17: South Western Districts
- 2016/17: Titans
- 2018: Cape Town Blitz
- 2023/24: Knights

Career statistics
Competition	Test	FC	LA	T20
Matches	12	123	77	51
Runs scored	214	2,579	640	103
Batting average	15.28	16.96	22.06	10.30
100s/50s	0/1	1/12	0/2	0/0
Top score	56	114	73	29*
Balls bowled	2,427	26,206	3,479	968
Wickets	37	448	73	30
Bowling average	41.10	31.77	36.12	36.40
5 wickets in innings	2	25	0	0
10 wickets in match	0	4	0	0
Best bowling	5/89	8/130	4/9	3/24
Catches/stumpings	5/–	66/–	21/–	12/–
- Source: ESPNcricinfo, 9 November 2024

Dane Leeroy Piedt (born 6 March 1990) is a South African cricketer. He played for the Cape Cobras. He made his Test cricket debut for South Africa against Zimbabwe in August 2014. In March 2020, Piedt announced his retirement from cricket in South Africa, and later moved to the United States. But in December 2023 he received a Test recall for the New Zealand series.

== Career ==
Piedt, like many of his other Cape Cobras' team-mates, made his first-class debut for the Western Province cricket team. Primarily an off-spin bowler, Piedt is also a useful lower-order batsman. Piedt signed with the Cape Cobras in 2011. In August 2017, he was named in Jo'burg Giants' squad for the first season of the T20 Global League. However, in October 2017, Cricket South Africa initially postponed the tournament until November 2018, with it being cancelled soon after.

In June 2018, he was named in the squad for the Cape Cobras team for the 2018–19 season. In October 2018, he was named in Cape Town Blitz's squad for the first edition of the Mzansi Super League T20 tournament. In January 2019, in the 2018–19 CSA 4-Day Franchise Series, he scored his maiden century in first-class cricket. He was the leading wicket-taker in the 2018–19 CSA 4-Day Franchise Series, with 54 dismissals in ten matches.

In August 2019, he was named the Four-day franchise Series Cricketer of the Season at Cricket South Africa's annual award ceremony.

In March 2020, Piedt announced that he would be moving from South Africa to the United States, so he could meet the criteria to play for the United States cricket team. In June 2021, he was selected to take part in the Minor League Cricket tournament in the United States following the players' draft.

In 2023, Piedt became part of the inaugural Major League Cricket competition, being signed to play for Washington Freedom.
