= Neil Brand (cricketer) =

South African cricketer (born 1996)

Personal information
- Born: 12 April 1996 (age 30); Johannesburg, Gauteng, South Africa
- Batting: Left-handed
- Bowling: Slow left-arm orthodox
- Role: Batting all-rounder

International information
- National side: South Africa
- Test debut (cap 360): 4 February 2024 v New Zealand
- Last Test: 13 February 2024 v New Zealand

Domestic team information
- Years: Team
- 2015–2017: Cardiff MCCU
- 2017/18–2025/26: Northerns
- 2018/19–2025/26: Titans
- 2022/23: Joburg Super Kings
- 2026/27-Present: Boland

Career statistics
Competition	Test	FC	LA	T20
Matches	2	70	41	8
Runs scored	66	4024	1016	589
Batting average	16.50	39.06	29.88	20.31
100s/50s	0/0	8/24	1/5	0/1
Top score	34	178	115*	76
Balls bowled	234	5,862	1416	402
Wickets	8	96	37	22
Bowling average	21.37	32.14	32.14	20.00
5 wickets in innings	1	1	0	0
10 wickets in match	0	0	0	0
Best bowling	6/119	6/119	4/61	3/24
Catches/stumpings	3/–	45/–	11/–	12/–
- Source: Cricinfo, 16 October 2026

Neil Brand (born 12 April 1996) is a South African cricketer who currently plays for Boland. He is a left-handed batsman and a left-arm orthodox bowler. He initially moved to King's College, Taunton, with a hope to qualify to play for the England cricket team, before returning to South Africa at the end of 2017.

Brand made his first-class debut for Cardiff MCCU against Glamorgan on 2 April 2015. He made his List A debut for Northerns in the 2017–18 CSA Provincial One-Day Challenge on 25 March 2018.

In September 2018, Brand was named in Northerns' squad for the 2018 Africa T20 Cup. He made his Twenty20 debut for Northerns in the 2018 Africa T20 Cup on 14 September 2018. In April 2021, he was named in Northerns' squad, ahead of the 2021–22 cricket season in South Africa. In July 2026, Brand was named in Boland's squad for the 2026/27 domestic cricket season. He made his Boland debut on 10 September 2026 in a First-class match again the Lions.

== International career ==
In November 2023, he was named as captain of South Africa A for the West Indies A tour of South Africa. He was named captain of South Africa on debut against New Zealand in February 2024 and became the 25th South African to take five wickets on Test debut. His 6/119 were the best figures for a captain on his debut Test, and for a South African spinner on his Test debut. He also claimed 2 wickets in the second innings.
