= Shaun von Berg =

South African cricketer (born 1986)

Personal information
- Born: 16 September 1986 (age 40); Pretoria, Transvaal, South Africa
- Batting: Right-handed
- Bowling: Right-arm leg break
- Role: Bowling all-rounder

International information
- National side: South Africa (2024-present)
- Only Test (cap 366): 13 February 2024 v New Zealand

Career statistics
| Competition | Test | FC | LA | T20 |
|---|---|---|---|---|
| Matches | 1 | 137 | 89 | 64 |
| Runs scored | 40 | 5,124 | 875 | 275 |
| Batting average | 20.00 | 29.44 | 16.82 | 17.18 |
| 100s/50s | 0/0 | 5/27 | 0/1 | 0/0 |
| Top score | 38 | 110* | 58* | 30 |
| Balls bowled | 174 | 26,644 | 4,120 | 1,260 |
| Wickets | 0 | 480 | 115 | 72 |
| Bowling average | – | 30.09 | 27.89 | 20.25 |
| 5 wickets in innings | – | 27 | 1 | 0 |
| 10 wickets in match | – | 5 | 0 | 0 |
| Best bowling | – | 7/66 | 5/33 | 4/15 |
| Catches/stumpings | 0/– | 95/– | 26/– | 10/– |
- Source: ESPNcricinfo, 4 April 2024

Shaun von Berg (born 16 September 1986) is a South African cricketer. He is a right-handed batsman and leg-break bowler who plays for Northerns. He was born in Pretoria.

== Domestic career ==
Von Berg made his cricketing debut in the Shepherd Neame Kent Cricket League for Sandwich Town, for whom he played 16 matches during the 2006 season, the team finishing in sixth place in the league.

Von Berg made his first-class debut for Northerns during the 2009–10 season, against Border. From the lower order, he scored 44 runs in the first innings in which he batted.

In August 2017, Von Berg was named in Bloem City Blazers' squad for the first season of the T20 Global League. However, in October 2017, Cricket South Africa initially postponed the tournament until November 2018, with it being cancelled soon after.

In June 2018, Von Berg was named in the squad for the Titans team for the 2018–19 season. In September 2018, he was named in the Titans' squad for the 2018 Abu Dhabi T20 Trophy. The following month, he was named in Tshwane Spartans' squad for the first edition of the Mzansi Super League T20 tournament. He was the joint-leading wicket-taker for Titans in the 2018–19 CSA 4-Day Franchise Series, with 21 dismissals in seven matches.

In September 2019, Von Berg was named in the squad for the Durban Heat team for the 2019 Mzansi Super League tournament. He was the joint-leading wicket-taker in the 2019–20 Momentum One Day Cup, with eighteen dismissals in nine matches. In April 2021, he was named in Boland's squad, ahead of the 2021–22 cricket season in South Africa.

== International career ==
In June 2018, Von Berg was named in South Africa's Test squad for their series against Sri Lanka, he played in the first tour match against a strong Sri Lanka Board XI and picked up two wickets. He had to wait for the 2024 Proteas tour to New Zealand before making his full Test debut in the second test at Hamilton .
