= Keegan Petersen =

South African cricketer (born 1993)

Personal information
- Full name: Keegan Darryl Petersen
- Born: 8 August 1993 (age 33); Paarl, Cape Province, South Africa
- Batting: Right-handed
- Bowling: Right-arm leg break
- Role: Top-order batter

International information
- National side: South Africa (2021–24)
- Test debut (cap 347): 10 June 2021 v West Indies
- Last Test: 13 February 2024 v New Zealand

Domestic team information
- Years: Team
- 2011/12–2016/17: Boland
- 2014/15–2016/17: Cape Cobras
- 2016/17–2019/20: Knights
- 2017/18–2019/20: Northern Cape
- 2020/21–2021/22: Dolphins
- 2022: Durham

Career statistics
Competition	Test	FC	LA	T20
Matches	14	132	77	60
Runs scored	704	7,994	2,224	1,079
Batting average	28.16	38.80	35.87	27.66
100s/50s	0/4	18/40	4/14	0/5
Top score	82	225*	134*	73*
Balls bowled	0	342	166	42
Wickets	–	3	3	0
Bowling average	–	109.00	48.33	–
5 wickets in innings	–	0	0	–
10 wickets in match	–	0	0	–
Best bowling	–	3/49	1/18	–
Catches/stumpings	18/–	105/4	31/0	30/1
- Source: Cricinfo, 17 February 2024

Keegan Darryl Petersen (born 8 August 1993) is a South African cricketer. A right-handed batsman, occasional wicket-keeper and occasional leg break bowler, he has played for Boland, Cape Cobras, Knights and Northern Cape in South African domestic cricket, having made his debut for Boland in February 2012. He made his international debut for the South Africa cricket team in June 2021.

== Career ==
=== Domestic career ===
In September 2018, Petersen was named in Northern Cape's squad for the 2018 Africa T20 Cup. He was the leading run-scorer in the 2018–19 CSA 4-Day Franchise Series, with 923 runs in nine matches. In April 2021, he was named in KwaZulu-Natal's squad, ahead of the 2021–22 cricket season in South Africa.

=== International career ===
In December 2019, Petersen was added to South Africa's Test squad for their series against England. In December 2020, Petersen was named in South Africa's Test squad for their series against Sri Lanka. However, he was later withdrawn from South Africa's squad after testing positive for COVID-19. In January 2021, Petersen was again named in South Africa's Test squad, this time for their series against Pakistan. In May 2021, Petersen was again named in South Africa's Test squad, this time for their series against the West Indies. Petersen made his Test debut on 6 June 2021, for South Africa against the West Indies.
He was selected in South Africa's squad for Test series versus India at home. He was adjudged the player of the match of the final test and was also the player of the series. He was the leading scorer in the series.
