= Allahudien Paleker =

Cricket umpire

Personal information
- Born: 1 January 1978 (age 48); Cape Town, South Africa
- Batting: Right-handed
- Bowling: Right-arm offbreak
- Role: Umpire

Umpiring information
- Tests umpired: 8 (2022–2025)
- ODIs umpired: 30 (2019–2025)
- T20Is umpired: 73 (2018–2026)
- WODIs umpired: 13 (2013–2019)
- WT20Is umpired: 4 (2016)

Career statistics
Competition	FC	LA
Matches	16	21
Runs scored	485	262
Batting average	23.09	26.20
100s/50s	0/1	0/1
Top score	71*	51
Balls bowled	66	0
Wickets	0	0
Bowling average	-	-
5 wickets in innings	-	-
10 wickets in match	-	-
Best bowling	-	-
Catches/stumpings	17/1	7/0
- Source: Cricinfo, 18 June 2024

Allahudien Paleker (born 1 January 1978) is a South African cricket umpire and former cricketer of Maharashtrian descent with roots tracing back to Ratnagiri district in Maharashtra, India. As an umpire, he has stood in matches in the 2015–16 Ram Slam T20 Challenge. He was part of Cricket South Africa's umpire panel for first-class matches. Currently, he is a member of the ICC Elite umpire panel.

In November 2017, Paleker was promoted to the ICC International Panel of Umpires. He stood in his first Twenty20 International (T20I) match, between South Africa and India at Centurion Park, on 21 February 2018. On 19 January 2019, he stood in his first One Day International (ODI) match, between South Africa and Pakistan at St George's Park.

He was one of the twelve umpires who officiated matches in the 2019 ICC T20 World Cup Qualifier tournament in the United Arab Emirates.

Paleker made his debut as an umpire in Tests when he took the field for the match between South Africa and India at the Wanderers Stadium in Johannesburg from 3–7 January 2022. In March 2025, he was promoted to the ICC Elite Umpire Panel.

== See also ==
- List of Test cricket umpires
- List of One Day International cricket umpires
- List of Twenty20 International cricket umpires
