= Senuran Muthusamy =

South African cricketer (born 1994)

- Muthusamy in 2026

Personal information
- Born: 22 February 1994 (age 32); Durban, Natal Province, South Africa
- Batting: Left-handed
- Bowling: Slow left-arm orthodox
- Role: Batting all-rounder

International information
- National side: South Africa (2019–present)
- Test debut (cap 337): 2 October 2019 v India
- Last Test: 23 November 2025 v India
- ODI debut (cap 158): 10 February 2025 v New Zealand
- Last ODI: 4 September 2025 v England
- T20I debut (cap 113): 16 July 2025 v New Zealand
- Last T20I: 16 August 2025 v Australia

Career statistics
Competition	Test	ODI	T20I	FC
Matches	8	5	5	115
Runs scored	388	22	24	5,326
Batting average	55.42	7.33	6.00	31.51
100s/50s	1/2	0/0	0/0	10/31
Top score	109	9*	9	181
Balls bowled	960	220	108	15,275
Wickets	23	6	5	278
Bowling average	26.34	38.83	25.60	28.05
5 wickets in innings	2	0	0	17
10 wickets in match	1	0	0	4
Best bowling	6/117	2/30	2/24	7/36
Catches/stumpings	7/–	2/–	2/–	65/–
Medal record
Men's cricket
Representing South Africa
ICC World Test Championship
Winner	2023–2025
- Source: ESPNcricinfo, 26 November 2025

Senuran Muthusamy (Tamil: [செனுரன் முத்துசாமி]; born 22 February 1994) is a South African cricketer. He made his international debut for the South Africa cricket team in October 2019. Muthusamy traces his ancestry to South India, with family in Nagapattinam, Tamil Nadu.

== Domestic career ==
He was included in the KwaZulu-Natal cricket team squad for the 2015 Africa T20 Cup. In August 2017, he was named in Cape Town Knight Riders' squad for the first season of the T20 Global League. However, in October 2017, Cricket South Africa initially postponed the tournament until November 2018, with it being cancelled soon after.

In September 2018, he was named in KwaZulu-Natal's squad for the 2018 Africa T20 Cup. In April 2021, he was named to North West's squad, ahead of the 2021–22 cricket season in South Africa.

In March 2022, on the opening day of the 2021–22 CSA One-Day Cup tournament, Muthusamy scored his first century in List A cricket, with 100 from 106 balls against Western Province.

== English county cricket career ==
In January 2026, Muthusamy agreed a contract to join Kent County Cricket Club as an overseas player for that year's T20 Blast and eight County Championship matches.

== International career ==
In August 2019, he was named in South Africa's Test squad for their series against India. He made his Test debut for South Africa, against India, on 2 October 2019. In the match, he took his first Test match wicket, dismissing the Indian captain, Virat Kohli, who was out caught and bowled for 20 runs. In February 2025, Muthusamy was named in the squad for the Tri-Series in Pakistan, his ODI debut.

== International centuries ==
Test centuries by Senuran Muthusamy
No.	Runs	Balls	Innings	Against	Venue	Country	Date	Result
1	109	206	1	India	Assam Cricket Association Stadium, Guwahati	India	22 November 2025	South Africa won by 408 runs

== International five-wicket hauls ==
Test five-wicket hauls by Senuran Muthusamy
No.	Bowling Figures	Overs	Innings	Against	Venue	Country	Date	Result
1	6/117	32	1	Pakistan	Gaddafi Stadium, Lahore	Pakistan	12 October 2025	Pakistan won by 93 runs
2	5/57	17	3	Pakistan	Gaddafi Stadium, Lahore	Pakistan	12 October 2025	Pakistan won by 93 runs
