= David Bedingham =

English-South African cricketer (born 1994)

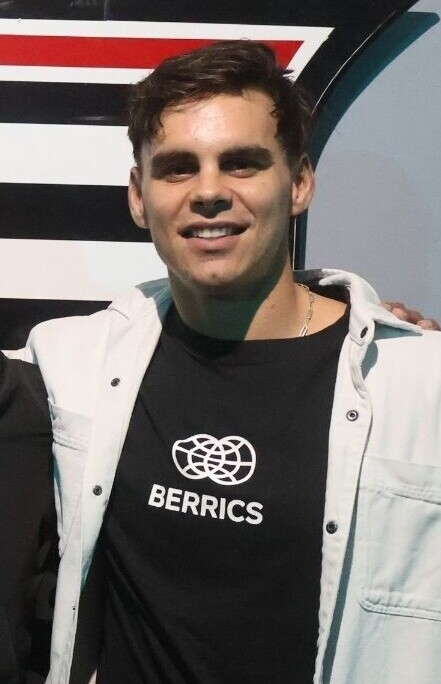
- Bedingham in 2025

Personal information
- Full name: David Guy Bedingham
- Born: 22 April 1994 (age 32); George, Cape Province South Africa
- Batting: Right-handed
- Bowling: Right-arm off break
- Role: Middle-order batter

International information
- National side: South Africa (2023–present)
- Test debut (cap 357): 26 December 2023 v India
- Last Test: 6 July 2025 v Zimbabwe

Domestic team information
- Years: Team
- 2012/13–2021/22, 2023/24–present: Western Province
- 2015/16–2018/19: Boland
- 2018/19–2019/20: Cape Cobras
- 2019: Cape Town Blitz
- 2020–present: Durham
- 2021: Birmingham Phoenix
- 2025: Sunrisers Eastern Cape
- 2026: Durban's Super Giants

Career statistics
Competition	Test	FC	LA	T20
Matches	18	139	61	96
Runs scored	984	10,265	2,430	1,847
Batting average	35.14	50.81	44.18	21.47
100s/50s	1/5	32/39	9/11	0/8
Top score	110	279	188*	78
Catches/stumpings	17/–	112/–	16/–	22/1
Medal record
Men's cricket
Representing South Africa
World Test Championship
Winner	2023–2025
- Source: Cricinfo, 1 November 2026

David Guy Bedingham (born 22 April 1994) is a South African cricketer. He holds United Kingdom ancestry visa and qualified for English county cricket as a local player. Bedingham was a member of the South African team which won the 2025 ICC World Test Championship final, the second ICC title the country has won till date.

== Career ==
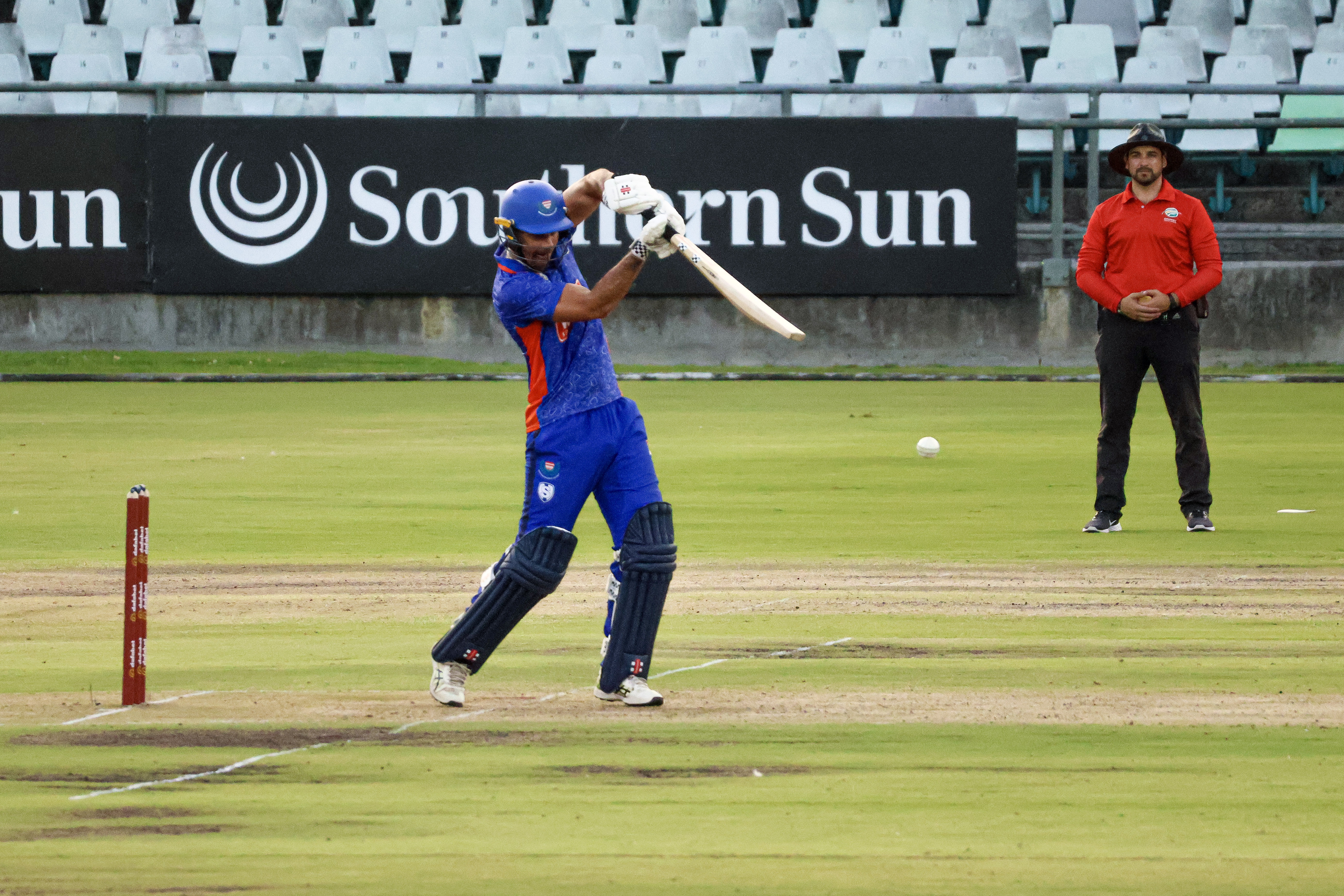
Bedingham batting in 2026 at Newlands Cricket Ground

Bedingham playing for South Africa in 2026

Bedingham made his first-class debut for Northerns in the 2012–13 CSA Provincial Three-Day Competition on 14 March 2013.

He was the leading run-scorer in the 2017–18 CSA Provincial One-Day Challenge tournament for Boland, with 283 runs in seven matches. He was also the leading run-scorer in the 2017–18 Sunfoil 3-Day Cup for Boland, with 790 runs in eight matches.

In June 2018, he was named in the squad for the Cape Cobras team for the 2018–19 season. In September 2018, he was named in Boland's squad for the 2018 Africa T20 Cup. In September 2019, he was named in the squad for the Cape Town Blitz team for the 2019 Mzansi Super League tournament.

In September 2019, he was named in Western Province's squad for the 2019–20 CSA Provincial T20 Cup. In April 2021, he was named in Western Province's squad, ahead of the 2021–22 cricket season in South Africa. Later the same month, Bedingham scored his maiden double century in first-class cricket, with 257 runs for Durham in the 2021 County Championship in England. In the inaugural season of The Hundred, he was signed by the Birmingham Phoenix to replace Finn Allen for the remainder of the tournament.

Having previously considered waiting to qualify for England, Bedingham made his long-awaited debut for South Africa in the 2023/24 2 match test series against India. In his debut at Centurion, Bedingham made his maiden test half century hitting 56 off 87 helping South Africa to a convincing victory.

Bedingham was again called up to the South African side to tour New Zealand for a 2 match test series. In the 2nd test of the series, Bedingham scored his maiden test century hitting 110 off 141 balls to set a 267 run target for New Zealand to chase.

Bedingham was a member of the South African team which won the 2025 World Test Championship final. In the final, he scored 45 (the highest score in the innings) and 21*.

== International centuries ==
Test centuries by David Bedingham
No.	Runs	Balls	Innings	Against	Venue	Country	Date	Result
1	110	141	3	New Zealand	Seddon Park, Hamilton, New Zealand	New Zealand	13 February 2024	New Zealand won by 7 wickets
