= Zubayr Hamza =

South African cricketer

Personal information
- Full name: Mohammad Zubayr Hamza
- Born: 19 June 1995 (age 31); Cape Town, Western Cape, South Africa
- Batting: Right-handed
- Bowling: Right-arm leg break
- Role: Batsman

International information
- National side: South Africa
- Test debut (cap 335): 11 January 2019 v Pakistan
- Last Test: 13 February 2024 v New Zealand
- Only ODI (cap 142): 26 November 2021 v Netherlands

Domestic team information
- Years: Team
- 2013/14–: Western Province
- 2015/16–: Cape Cobras
- 2018/19: South Western Districts

Career statistics
Competition	Test	ODI	FC	LA
Matches	9	1	113	84
Runs scored	390	56	7,937	2,734
Batting average	22.94	56.00	48.39	38.50
100s/50s	0/2	0/1	20/43	4/15
Top score	83	56	222*	156
Catches/stumpings	7/–	0/–	117/–	38/–
- Source: Cricinfo, 19 November 2026

Mohammad Zubayr Hamza (born 19 June 1995) is a South African cricketer. He made his Test debut for the South Africa cricket team in January 2019, becoming South Africa's 100th Test player since readmission. In domestic cricket, he was named as the captain of the Cape Cobras, ahead of the 2020–21 season.

== Domestic career ==
Hamza was included in the Western Province cricket team squad for the 2015 Africa T20 Cup. In the 2016–17 Sunfoil Series match in October 2016 between Cape Cobras and Knights, he was dismissed after he handled the ball. In August 2017, he was named in Jo'burg Giants' squad for the first season of the T20 Global League. However, in October 2017, Cricket South Africa initially postponed the tournament until November 2018, with it being cancelled soon after.

In June 2018, he was named in the squad for the Cape Cobras team for the 2018–19 season. In September 2018, he was named in South Western Districts' squad for the 2018 Africa T20 Cup. He was the leading run-scorer for South Western Districts in the tournament, with 102 runs in four matches.

In April 2021, he was named in Western Province's squad, ahead of the 2021–22 cricket season in South Africa. On 24 September 2021, in the opening fixture of the 2021–22 CSA Provincial T20 Knock-Out tournament, Hamza scored his first century in T20 cricket, with 106 runs.

== International career ==
In December 2018, Hamza was named in South Africa's Test squad for their series against Pakistan. He made his Test debut for South Africa against Pakistan on 11 January 2019. In May 2021, he was named as the captain of the South Africa A team for their tour to Zimbabwe. In June 2021, in the first unofficial Test match, Hamza scored unbeaten 222 runs, which led South Africa A to victory over Zimbabwe A by an innings and 166 runs.

In November 2021, he was named in South Africa's One Day International (ODI) squad for their series against the Netherlands. He made his ODI debut on 26 November 2021, for South Africa against the Netherlands.

In March 2022, Hamza tested positive for furosemide, a prohibited substance, following an ICC anti-doping test in January. Hamza did not dispute the outcome of the test, and agreed to a voluntary suspension, before being provisionally suspended by the ICC.

In April 2023, he was recalled to the South Africa A's first-class and List A squad for their tour to Sri Lanka. In December 2023, he was selected in South Africa's squad for the test series against New Zealand.
