= 2014–15 Momentum One Day Cup =

Cricket championship in South Africa

- Dates: 10 October 2014 – 13 February 2015
- Administrator(s): Cricket South Africa
- Cricket format: List A
- Tournament format(s): Double round-robin and playoffs
- Champions: Titans
- Participants: 6
- Most runs: Andrew Puttick (Cape Cobras) 652
- Most wickets: Robin Peterson (Cape Cobras) 18

The 2014–15 Momentum One Day Cup was a domestic one-day cricket championship in South Africa. It was the 34th time the championship was contested. The competition started on 10 October 2014 and the final took place on 13 February 2015. The Titans defeated the Cape Cobras in the final, which was played at Newlands Cricket Ground in Cape Town.

== Group stage ==
=== Points table ===
| Pos | Team | Pld | W | L | NR | BP | Pts | NRR |
|---|---|---|---|---|---|---|---|---|
| 1 | Cape Cobras (R) | 10 | 6 | 3 | 1 | 3 | 29 | 0.391 |
| 2 | Dolphins (3) | 10 | 5 | 2 | 3 | 0 | 26 | 0.155 |
| 3 | Titans (W) | 10 | 5 | 5 | 0 | 1 | 21 | 0.175 |
| 4 | Warriors | 10 | 5 | 5 | 0 | 1 | 21 | −0.043 |
| 5 | Lions | 10 | 3 | 6 | 1 | 1 | 15 | −0.259 |
| 6 | Knights | 10 | 3 | 6 | 1 | 1 | 15 | −0.416 |

== Knockout stage ==
Of the 6 participants, the following 3 teams qualified for the knockout stage:

| Semifinal | | | Final |
| | | | 1 | Cape Cobras | 285/8 |
| 3 | Titans | 267/6 | 3 | Titans | 288/5 |
| 2 | Dolphins | 209 |

=== Semi-final ===
10 February 2015
Scorecard

| Titans; 267/6 (50 overs) | v | Dolphins; 209 (44.3 overs) |
| Dean Elgar 100 (130); Keshav Maharaj 3/50 (10 overs) | | Khaya Zondo 72 (87); Albie Morkel 3/33 (9.3 overs) |

Titans won by 58 runs
Kingsmead, Durban
Umpires: Shaun George and Adrian Holdstock
Player of the match: Dean Elgar (Titans)

=== Final ===
13 February 2015
Scorecard

| Cape Cobras; 285/8 (50 overs) | v | Titans; 288/5 (47.1 overs) |
| Richard Levi 104 (113); Henry Davids 2/53 (10 overs) | | Albie Morkel 134* (103); Rory Kleinveldt 3/65 (10 overs) |

Titans won by 5 wickets
Newlands, Cape Town
Umpires: Shaun George and Adrian Holdstock
Player of the match: Albie Morkel (Titans)

== Statistics ==
=== Most Runs ===
| Player | Team | Runs | Matches | I | NO | Highest score | Avg | Balls faced | Strike rate | 100s | 50s | 0s | Fours | Sixes |
|---|---|---|---|---|---|---|---|---|---|---|---|---|---|---|
| Andrew Puttick | (South Africa) Cape Cobras | 652 | 10 | 10 | 1 | 101 | 72.44 | 876 | 74.42 | 7 | 1 | 0 | 65 | 1 |
| Colin Ingram | (South Africa) Warriors | 624 | 10 | 10 | 2 | 106* | 78.00 | 633 | 98.57 | 2 | 4 | 0 | 54 | 12 |
| JJ Smuts | (South Africa) Warriors | 592 | 10 | 10 | 0 | 94 | 59.20 | 700 | 84.57 | 6 | 0 | 0 | 68 | 4 |
| Theunis de Bruyn | (South Africa) Titans | 543 | 10 | 10 | 1 | 152* | 60.33 | 611 | 88.87 | 2 | 2 | 0 | 62 | 9 |
| Vaughn van Jaarsveld | (South Africa) Dolphins | 443 | 10 | 8 | 0 | 118 | 55.37 | 486 | 91.15 | 3 | 1 | 1 | 34 | 12 |

Source: Cricinfo

=== Most Wickets ===
| Player | Team | Wickets | Matches | Overs | Maidens | Runs | Best Figures | Avg | Econ | SR | 5W |
|---|---|---|---|---|---|---|---|---|---|---|---|
| Robin Peterson | (South Africa) Cape Cobras | 18 | 10 | 89.1 | 7 | 349 | 5/25 | 19.38 | 3.91 | 29.7 | 1 |
| Dillon du Preez | (South Africa) Knights | 16 | 10 | 83.5 | 12 | 406 | 4/34 | 25.37 | 4.84 | 31.4 | 0 |
| Robert Frylinck | (South Africa) Dolphins | 15 | 9 | 75.2 | 6 | 408 | 4/30 | 27.20 | 5.41 | 30.1 | 0 |
| Lundi Mbane | (South Africa) Warriors | 15 | 9 | 79.0 | 3 | 492 | 4/47 | 32.80 | 6.22 | 31.6 | 0 |
| Rory Kleinveldt | (South Africa) Cape Cobras | 13 | 10 | 89.0 | 9 | 408 | 3/28 | 31.38 | 4.58 | 41.0 | 0 |

Source: Cricinfo
