= 2014 Ram Slam T20 Challenge (November) =

- Dates: 2 November 2014 – 12 December 2014
- Administrator: Cricket South Africa
- Cricket format: Twenty20
- Tournament format(s): Double round-robin and knockout
- Host: South Africa
- Champions: Cape Cobras (3rd title)
- Participants: 6
- Matches: 32
- Player of the series: Kieron Pollard, Cape Cobras
- Most runs: Richard Levi, Cape Cobras (392)
- Most wickets: Shadley van Schalkwyk, Knights (15)

The 2014–15 Ram Slam T20 Challenge was the twelfth season of the Ram Slam T20 Challenge, established by the Cricket South Africa. The tournament was played between 2 November and 12 December 2014.

The Cape Cobras beat the Knights in the final by 33 runs to win the tournament for the thirds time.

== Venues ==
Map of the venues for the 2012–13 Ram Slam T20 Challenge

Stadium	City	Capacity	Home team
Newlands	Cape Town	25,000	Cape Cobras
Boland Bank Park	Paarl	10,000	Cape Cobras
Kingsmead	Durban	25,000	Dolphins
Chevrolet Park	Bloemfontein	20,000	Knights
De Beers Diamond Oval	Kimberley	11,000	Knights
New Wanderers Stadium	Johannesburg	34,000	Highveld Lions
Senwes Park	Potchefstroom	9,000	Highveld Lions
SuperSport Park	Centurion	20,000	Titans
Willowmoore Park	Benoni	20,000	Titans
St George's Park	Port Elizabeth	19,000	Warriors
Buffalo Park	East London	15,000	Warriors

The first round of matches were all played on 2 November in Johannesburg.

== Rules and regulations ==
The tournament is divided into a group stage and a knockout stage. In the group stage, teams face each other in a double round-robin tournament (i.e. each team plays every other team twice, once at home and once away). At the end of the group stage, the top team qualifies for the final. The teams in second and third take part in a play-off match with the winners contesting the final. If a match in the knockout stage ends with a tie, a Super Over will determine the winner.

Points were awarded as follows in the group stage:

Point system
Result	Points
Win, with bonus point	5 points
Win, without bonus point	4 points
Tie	3 points
No result	2 points
Loss	0 points

- The team that achieves a run rate of 1.25 times that of the opposition shall be rewarded one bonus point.
- A team's run rate will be calculated by reference to the runs scored in an innings divided by the number of overs faced.
- Points are deducted for slow over rate at 1 point per over not completed within the allotted 90 minutes.

In the event of teams finishing on equal points, the right to play in the semi-finals will be determined in the following order of priority:

- The team with the most wins;
- If still equal, the team with the most wins over the other team(s) who are equal on points and have the same number of wins;
- If still equal, the team with the highest number of bonus points;
- If still equal, the team with the highest net run rate;
- The team with the higher runs to wickets ratio throughout the series.

== Teams and standings ==
Pos	Team	Pld	W	L	T	NR	BP	Pts	NRR
1	Cape Cobras (W)	10	8	1	0	1	3	37	1.146
2	Lions	10	6	3	0	1	2	28	0.017
3	Knights (R)	10	4	3	0	3	2	24	1.207
4	Dolphins	10	3	6	0	1	2	16	0.060
5	Warriors	10	3	6	1	0	0	15	−1.343
6	Titans	10	2	7	1	0	0	11	−0.703

(C) = Eventual champion; (R) = Runner-up.
Note: The winner and runner-up qualify for the 2014 Champions League Twenty20.

- List of results at ESPN Cricinfo

== Knockout stage ==
Semi-final

7 December
14:30
Scorecard

(H) Lions; 200/4 (20 overs)	v	Knights; 169 (19.2 overs)
Temba Bavuma 36 (25); Malusi Siboto 2/26 (4 overs)		Reeza Hendricks 74* (53); Kagiso Rabada 1/13 (3 overs)

Knights won by 2 wickets
Wanderers, Johannesburg
Umpires: Johan Cloete and Shaun George

- Lions won the toss and elected to bat.

Final

12 December
18:00 (D/N)
Scorecard

(H) Cape Cobras; 158/4 (20 overs)	v	Knights; 125/9 (20 overs)
Omphile Ramela 54 (34); Obus Pienaar 1/6 (1 over)		Reeza Hendricks 41 (35); Dane Paterson 4/33 (4 overs)

Cape Cobras won by 33 runs
Newlands, Cape Town
Umpires: Johan Cloete and Shaun George

- Cape Cobras won the toss and elected to bat.
