= 2011–12 Franchise One Day Cup =

- Dates: 2 November 2011 – 9 December 2011
- Administrator(s): Cricket South Africa
- Cricket format: List A
- Tournament format(s): Double round-robin and playoffs
- Champions: Cape Cobras
- Participants: 6
- Most runs: Dean Elgar (Knights) 567
- Most wickets: Charl Langeveldt (Cape Cobras) 22

The 2011–12 Franchise One Day Cup was a domestic one-day cricket championship in South Africa. The tournament was without a title sponsor this season, having previously been called the MTN40 (and would become the Momentum One Day Cup the following year). It was the 31st time the championship was contested. In a change from previous seasons, matches were played over 50 overs per side instead of 40. The first match was played on 2 November 2011 and the final was on 9 December 2011 at Newlands Cricket Ground in Cape Town. The trophy was won by the Cape Cobras after they defeated the Warriors in the final.

The format of the groups stage reverted to a single group with home and away matches played between all franchises. The 13 players per side innovation trialed during the 2010–11 MTN40 was scrapped.

== Group stage ==
=== Points table ===
Pos	Team	Pld	W	L	T	NR	BP	Pts	NRR
1	Cape Cobras (W)	10	7	1	0	2	1	33	0.550
2	Knights (3)	10	6	4	0	0	3	27	0.610
3	Warriors (R)	10	5	4	0	1	3	25	0.768
4	Dolphins	10	2	4	0	4	0	16	−1.334
5	Titans	10	3	6	0	1	1	15	−0.656
6	Lions	10	2	6	0	2	1	13	−0.568

Source: Cricinfo

== Knockout stage ==
Of the 6 participants, the following 3 teams qualified for the knockout stage:

Semifinal			Final
			2	Warriors	242/9
2	Knights	280/5	1	Cape Cobras	245/5
3	Warriors	282/6

=== Semi-final ===
4 December 2011
Scorecard

Knights; 280/5 (50 overs)	v	Warriors; 282/6 (49 overs)
Dean Elgar 89* (94); Wayne Parnell 2/57 (10 overs)		Colin Ingram 112 (111); Duanne Olivier 3/46 (9 overs)

Warriors won by 4 wickets
Mangaung Oval, Bloemfontein
Umpires: Earl Hendrikse and Dennis Smith
Player of the match: Colin Ingram (Warriors)

- Warriors won the toss and decided to field

=== Final ===
9 December 2011
Scorecard

Warriors; 242/9 (50 overs)	v	Cape Cobras; 245/5 (48.3 overs)
Ashwell Prince 63 (87); Charl Langeveldt 5/45 (10 overs)		Richard Levi 84 (111); Rusty Theron 2/54 (9 overs)

Cape Cobras won by 5 wickets
Newlands, Cape Town
Umpires: Shaun George and Adrian Holdstock
Player of the match: Charl Langeveldt (Cape Cobras)

- Cape Cobras won the toss and decided to field

== Statistics ==
=== Most Runs ===
Player	Team	Runs	Matches	I	NO	Highest score	Avg	Balls faced	Strike rate	100s	50s	0s	Fours	Sixes
Dean Elgar	(South Africa) Knights	567	10	9	2	117	81.00	662	85.64	1	4	0	50	4
Faf du Plessis	(South Africa) Titans	554	10	10	2	120	68.00	596	91.27	2	2	0	50	5
Colin Ingram	(South Africa) Warriors	505	12	12	1	112	45.90	535	94.39	1	3	1	54	7
Arno Jacobs	(South Africa) Warriors	457	12	12	1	74	41.54	553	82.64	0	5	1	53	1
Neil McKenzie	(South Africa) Lions	455	9	8	2	108*	75.83	500	91.00	2	3	1	46	2

Source: Cricinfo

=== Most Wickets ===
Player	Team	Wickets	Matches	Overs	Maidens	Runs	Best Figures	Avg	Econ	SR	5W
Charl Langeveldt	(South Africa) Cape Cobras	22	9	86.5	0	446	5/45	20.27	5.13	23.6	1
Dillon du Preez	(South Africa) Knights	19	10	77.2	3	441	5/47	23.21	5.70	24.4	1
Makhaya Ntini	(South Africa) Warriors	18	12	84.5	4	404	3/48	22.44	4.76	28.2	0
Marchant de Lange	(South Africa) Titans	15	6	55.0	3	305	5/67	20.33	5.54	22.0	1
Wayne Parnell	(South Africa) Warriors	14	11	84.4	4	468	3/53	33.42	5.52	36.2	0

Source: Cricinfo
