= 2013–14 Momentum One Day Cup =

Cricket tournament

- Dates: 11 October 2013 – 16 November 2013
- Administrator(s): Cricket South Africa
- Cricket format: List A
- Tournament format(s): Double round-robin and playoffs
- Champions: Cape Cobras; Titans
- Participants: 6
- Most runs: Heino Kuhn (Titans) 470
- Most wickets: Hardus Viljoen (Lions) 19

The 2013–14 Momentum One Day Cup was a domestic one-day cricket championship in South Africa. It was the 33rd time the championship was contested. The competition started on 10 October 2013 and the final took place on 15 November 2013 at Newlands Cricket Ground in Cape Town. The trophy was shared by the Cape Cobras and the Titans when the final was abandoned after fewer than 6 over were completed (and the reserve day was completely abandoned) due to rain.

== Group stage ==
=== Points table ===
Pos	Team	Pld	W	L	NR	BP	Pts	NRR
1	Cape Cobras (W)	10	6	2	2	0	28	0.026
2	Dolphins (3)	10	5	2	3	2	28	0.409
3	Titans (W)	10	5	4	1	2	24	0.468
4	Warriors	10	4	3	3	2	24	0.240
5	Knights	10	3	6	1	1	15	−0.354
6	Lions	10	1	7	2	0	8	−0.771

Source: Cricinfo

RESULT POINTS:

- Win – 4
- Tie – 2 each
- No Result – 2 each
- Loss – 0

== Knockout stage ==
Of the 6 participants, the following 3 teams qualified for the knockout stage:

Semifinal			Final
			1	Cape Cobras	7/0
2	Dolphins	237	2	Titans
3	Titans	240/5

=== Semi-final ===
12 November 2013
Scorecard

Dolpins; 237 (49.4 overs)	v	Titans; 240/5 (48.3 overs)
Daryn Smit 53 (59); CJ de Villiers 3/40 (8 overs)		Heino Kuhn 102 (117); Khaya Zondo 1/15 (3 overs)

Titans won by 5 wickets
Kingsmead, Durban
Umpires: Johan Cloete and Shaun George
Player of the match: Heino Kuhn (Titans)

=== Final ===
15 November 2013
Scorecard

Cape Cobras; 7/0 (5.5 overs)	v	Titans

No result
Newlands, Cape Town
Umpires: Johan Cloete and Shaun George

- Match abandoned after 5.5 overs due to rain. The match was scheduled to be replayed the following day, but this was abandoned without a ball bowled.
- Trophy shared

== Statistics ==
=== Most Runs ===
Player	Team	Runs	Matches	I	NO	Highest score	Avg	Balls faced	Strike rate	100s	50s	0s	Fours	Sixes
Heino Kuhn	(South Africa) Titans	470	12	11	1	104	47.00	501	93.81	2	2	1	54	3
Henry Davids	(South Africa) Titans	400'	9	9	0	95	44.44	472	84.74	0	4	0	44	5
Colin Ingram	(South Africa) Warriors	395	7	7	1	96*	65.83	500	79.00	0	4	0	45	2
Morné van Wyk	(South Africa) Dolphins	394	11	10	0	107	39.40	456	86.40	1	1	0	49	6
Farhaan Behardien	(South Africa) Titans	362	12	9	2	113*	51.71	379	95.51	1	2	1	28	10
Rilee Rossouw	(South Africa) Knights	362	9	9	0	102	40.22	357	101.40	1	2	1	46	3

Source: Cricinfo

=== Most Wickets ===
Player	Team	Wickets	Matches	Overs	Maidens	Runs	Best Figures	Avg	Econ	SR	5W
Hardus Viljoen	(South Africa) Lions	19	9	80.1	1	501	4/60	26.36	6.24	25.3	1
Craig Alexander	(South Africa) Dolphins	18	11	77.0	8	373	5/42	20.72	4.84	25.6	2
Kyle Abbott	(South Africa) Dolphins	15	11	80.4	9	336	4/44	22.40	4.16	32.2	0
Roelof van der Merwe	(South Africa) Titans	15	12	90.0	3	388	4/40	25.86	4.31	36.0	0
Charl Langeveldt	(South Africa) Cape Cobras	14	8	70.5	9	323	4/22	23.07	4.56	30.3	0

Source: Cricinfo
