= 2020–21 Momentum One Day Cup =

Cricket tournament

- Dates: 9 January – 5 February 2021
- Administrator: Cricket South Africa
- Cricket format: List A
- Tournament format(s): Double round-robin and playoffs
- Champions: Dolphins; Lions
- Participants: 6
- Matches: 15
- Most runs: Janneman Malan (232); Dominic Hendricks (232)
- Most wickets: Sisanda Magala (8); Imran Manack (8)

The 2020–21 Momentum One Day Cup was a domestic one-day cricket tournament that took place in South Africa in January and February 2021. Six teams took part in the tournament, split into two groups. Dolphins were the defending champions. It was the last season of franchise cricket, after Cricket South Africa announced a revamp to their domestic structure in March 2021.

On 3 January 2021, Cricket South Africa confirmed a revised schedule of fifteen matches, with them all played behind closed doors at Senwes Park in Potchefstroom. The six teams were placed into two groups of three, with the top two teams of each group progressing to the semi-finals. On 9 January 2021, Cricket South Africa issued a further revision to the schedule, including moving the Pool B matches forward by one week.

In Pool A, three of the first five matches were abandoned due to rain, resulting in Dolphins winning the group ahead of the final match. The sixth match in Pool A was also abandoned with no play, meaning that Knights advanced to the semi-finals. Lions won their first three matches in Pool B to top the group and advance to the semi-finals. The last match in Pool B, between Cape Cobras and Warriors, was impacted by the weather. Cape Cobras won by 41 runs via the DLS method to become the fourth team to reach the semi-finals.

In the first semi-final, Dolphins beat Cabe Cobras by three wickets to advance to the final. The second semi-final was washed out with no play possible. Lions progressed to the final, after they finished higher than the Knights in the Pool matches. No play was possible on the scheduled day of the final due to rain, with the match moved to the reserve day. The final finished in no result due to rain, with Dolphins and Lions sharing the title.

== Teams ==
The teams were placed into the following groups:

- Pool A: Dolphins, Titans, Knights
- Pool B: Cape Cobras, Lions, Warriors

== Standing ==
=== Pool A ===
Pos	Team	Pld	W	L	NR	Pts	NRR
1	Dolphins	4	2	0	2	13	1.290
2	Knights	4	0	1	3	6	−1.060
3	Titans	4	0	1	3	5	−1.520

Source: ESPNcricinfo

Advanced to the Finals

=== Pool B ===
Pos	Team	Pld	W	L	NR	Pts	NRR
1	Lions	4	3	1	0	14	0.201
2	Cape Cobras	4	2	2	0	10	−0.089
3	Warriors	4	1	3	0	5	−0.134

Source: ESPN Cricinfo

Advanced to the Finals

== Fixtures ==
=== Pool A ===
9 January 2021
Scorecard

Dolphins; 272/7 (50 overs)	v	Titans; 196/8 (50 overs)
Senuran Muthusamy 70* (67); Dayyaan Galiem 2/22 (6 overs)		Theunis de Bruyn 36 (52); Ruan de Swardt 3/17 (6.3 overs)

Dolphins won by 76 runs
Senwes Park, Potchefstroom
Umpires: Abdoellah Steenkamp and Shaun George

- Titans won the toss and elected to field.

10 January 2021
Scorecard

Knights; 290/8 (50 overs)	v	Dolphins; 237 (46.1 overs)
Grant Roelofsen 92 (101); Jacques Snyman 2/52 (10 overs)		Andries Gous 54 (61); Robert Frylinck 2/14 (8 overs)

Dolphins won by 53 runs
Senwes Park, Potchefstroom
Umpires: Abongile Sodumo and Arno Jacobs

- Dolphins won the toss and elected to field.

11 January 2021
Scorecard

Knights	v	Titans

Match abandoned
Senwes Park, Potchefstroom
Umpires: Mazizi Gampu and Shaun George

- No toss.
- No play was possible due to rain.

14 January 2021
Scorecard

Dolphins	v	Titans

Match abandoned
Senwes Park, Potchefstroom
Umpires: Arno Jacobs and Mazizi Gampu

- No toss.
- No play was possible due to rain.

15 January 2021
Scorecard

Titans	v	Knights

Match abandoned
Senwes Park, Potchefstroom
Umpires: Abdoellah Steenkamp and Abongile Sodumo

- No toss.
- No play was possible due to rain.

16 January 2021
Scorecard

Knights	v	Dolphins

Match abandoned
Senwes Park, Potchefstroom
Umpires: Abdoellah Steenkamp and Arno Jacobs

- No toss.
- No play was possible due to rain.

=== Pool B ===
22 January 2021
Scorecard

Cape Cobras; 221 (49 overs)	v	Lions; 222/4 (39.2 overs)
Janneman Malan 67 (94); Aaron Phangiso 2/33 (10 overs)		Ryan Rickelton 109* (100); Siyabonga Mahima 1/32 (8.2 overs)

Lions won by 6 wickets
Senwes Park, Potchefstroom
Umpires: Shaun George and Siphelele Gasa

- Cape Cobras won the toss and elected to bat.
- Siyabonga Mahima (Cape Cobras) made his List A debut.

24 January 2021
Scorecard

Lions; 210 (48.1 overs)	v	Warriors; 168 (47 overs)
Nicky van den Bergh 73 (92); Mthiwekhaya Nabe 4/31 (9.1 overs)		Wihan Lubbe 42 (64); Delano Potgieter 2/19 (5 overs)

Lions won by 42 runs
Senwes Park, Potchefstroom
Umpires: Shaun George and Thomas Mokorosi

- Warriors won the toss and elected to field.

27 January 2021
Scorecard

Warriors; 226/6 (44 overs)	v	Cape Cobras; 148 (40 overs)
Sinethemba Qeshile 64* (74); Ziyaad Abrahams 2/32 (8 overs)		Tony de Zorzi 30 (45); Rudi Second 3/20 (6 overs)

Warriors won by 81 runs (DLS method)
Senwes Park, Potchefstroom
Umpires: Philip Vosloo and Shaun George

- Cape Cobras won the toss and elected to field.
- Cape Cobras were set a revised target of 230 runs from 44 overs due to rain.

28 January 2021
Scorecard

Warriors; 247/9 (50 overs)	v	Lions; 253/4 (46.1 overs)
JJ Smuts 102 (119); Bjorn Fortuin 3/52 (10 overs)		Dominic Hendricks 91* (109); Basheeru-Deen Walters 3/55 (7.4 overs)

Lions won by 6 wickets
Senwes Park, Potchefstroom
Umpires: Philip Vosloo and Shaun George

- Warriors won the toss and elected to bat.

29 January 2021
Scorecard

Cape Cobras; 284/5 (50 overs)	v	Lions; 208 (45.4 overs)
Janneman Malan 95 (97); Bjorn Fortuin 2/42 (9 overs)		Eldred Hawken 37 (36); Onke Nyaku 4/29 (10 overs)

Cape Cobras won by 76 runs
Senwes Park, Potchefstroom
Umpires: Dennis Smith and Thomas Mokorosi

- Cape Cobras won the toss and elected to bat.

30 January 2021
Scorecard

Warriors; 262 (50 overs)	v	Cape Cobras; 134/0 (26.4 overs)
Rudi Second 63 (81); Ziyaad Abrahams 3/52 (10 overs)		Janneman Malan 69* (80)

Cape Cobras won by 41 runs (DLS method)
Senwes Park, Potchefstroom
Umpires: Ryan Hendricks and Shaun George

- Warriors won the toss and elected to bat.
- Cape Cobras were set a revised target of 94 runs from 26.4 overs due to rain.

== Finals ==
1st Semi-Final
1 February 2021
Scorecard

Cape Cobras; 196 (46.2 overs)	v	Dolphins; 197/7 (42.3 overs)
Tony de Zorzi 61 (71); Ottniel Baartman 3/15 (5 overs)		Robert Frylinck 62 (60); Imran Manack 2/36 (10 overs)

Dolphins won by 3 wickets
Senwes Park, Potchefstroom
Umpires: Allahudien Paleker and Shaun George

- Dolphins won the toss and elected to field.

2nd Semi-Final
2 February 2021
Scorecard

Knights	v	Lions

No result
Senwes Park, Potchefstroom
Umpires: Bongani Jele and Dennis Smith

- Lions won the toss and elected to field.
- No play was possible due to rain.

Final
4–5 February 2021
Scorecard

Lions; 225/7 (45 overs)	v	Dolphins; 37/2 (10.2 overs)
Dominic Hendricks 65 (74); Eathan Bosch 4/41 (9 overs)		Michael Erlank 20* (34); Sisanda Magala 2/17 (5 overs)

No result
Senwes Park, Potchefstroom
Umpires: Bongani Jele and Allahudien Paleker

- Dolphins won the toss and elected to field.
- No play was possible on day 1 with the match moved to the reserve day.
- The match was reduced to 45 overs per side due to a wet outfield.
- Rain during Dolphins' innings prevented any further play.
