= 2013 Champions Trophy squads =

This is a list of squads selected for the 2013 ICC Champions Trophy.

== Group A ==
=== Australia ===
Coach: (South Africa) Mickey Arthur

No.	Player	Date of birth	ODIs	Batting	Bowling style	List A team
23	Michael Clarke (c)	2 April 1981 (aged 32)	227	Right	Slow left arm orthodox	(Australia) New South Wales
2	George Bailey (vc)	7 September 1982 (aged 30)	21	Right	Right-arm medium	(Australia) Tasmania
6	Nathan Coulter-Nile	11 October 1987 (aged 25)	0	Right	Right-arm fast	Western Australia
3	Xavier Doherty	22 November 1982 (aged 30)	43	Left	Slow left arm orthodox	(Australia) Tasmania
44	James Faulkner	29 April 1990 (aged 23)	5	Right	Left-arm fast-medium	(Australia) Tasmania
64	Phillip Hughes	30 November 1988 (aged 24)	10	Left	—	South Australia
25	Mitchell Johnson	2 November 1981 (aged 31)	121	Left	Left-arm fast	Western Australia
27	Clint McKay	20 February 1983 (aged 30)	42	Right	Right-arm fast-medium	(Australia) Victoria
8	Mitchell Marsh	20 October 1991 (aged 21)	1	Right	Right-arm medium	Western Australia
28	Glenn Maxwell	14 October 1988 (aged 24)	11	Right	Right-arm off break	(Australia) Victoria
56	Mitchell Starc	30 January 1990 (aged 23)	18	Left	Left-arm fast	(Australia) New South Wales
24	Adam Voges	4 October 1979 (aged 33)	17	Right	Slow left arm orthodox	Western Australia
13	Matthew Wade (wk)	26 December 1987 (aged 25)	32	Left	Right-arm medium	(Australia) Victoria
31	David Warner	27 October 1986 (aged 26)	38	Left	Leg break	(Australia) New South Wales
33	Shane Watson	17 June 1981 (aged 31)	157	Right	Right-arm fast-medium	(Australia) New South Wales

=== England ===
Coach: (England) Ashley Giles

No.	Player	Date of birth	ODIs	Batting	Bowling style	List A team
26	Alastair Cook (c)	25 December 1984 (aged 28)	67	Left	Right-arm off break	(England) Essex
9	James Anderson	30 July 1982 (aged 30)	169	Left	Right-arm fast-medium	(England) Lancashire
51	Jonny Bairstow (wk)	26 September 1989 (aged 23)	7	Right	Right-arm bowler	(England) Yorkshire
7	Ian Bell	11 April 1982 (aged 31)	130	Right	Right-arm medium	(England) Warwickshire
42	Ravi Bopara	4 May 1985 (aged 28)	84	Right	Right-arm medium	(England) Essex
20	Tim Bresnan	28 February 1985 (aged 28)	72	Right	Right-arm medium-fast	(England) Yorkshire
8	Stuart Broad	24 June 1986 (aged 26)	97	Left	Right-arm fast-medium	(England) Nottinghamshire
63	Jos Buttler (wk)	8 September 1990 (aged 22)	9	Right	—	(England) Somerset
25	Steven Finn	4 April 1989 (aged 24)	34	Right	Right-arm fast-medium	(England) Middlesex
16	Eoin Morgan	10 September 1986 (aged 26)	97	Left	Right-arm medium	(England) Middlesex
61	Joe Root	30 December 1990 (aged 22)	11	Right	Right-arm off break	(England) Yorkshire
66	Graeme Swann	24 March 1979 (aged 34)	78	Right	Right-arm off break	(England) Nottinghamshire
53	James Tredwell	27 February 1982 (aged 31)	15	Left	Right-arm off break	(England) Kent
4	Jonathan Trott	22 April 1981 (aged 32)	60	Right	Right-arm medium	(England) Warwickshire
31	Chris Woakes	2 March 1989 (aged 24)	13	Right	Right-arm medium	(England) Warwickshire

=== New Zealand ===
Coach: (New Zealand) Mike Hesson

No.	Player	Date of birth	ODIs	Batting	Bowling style	List A team
42	Brendon McCullum (c)	27 September 1981 (aged 31)	215	Right	Right-arm medium	(New Zealand) Otago
34	Doug Bracewell	28 September 1990 (aged 22)	7	Right	Right-arm fast-medium	(New Zealand) Central Districts
2	Ian Butler	24 November 1981 (aged 31)	26	Right	Right-arm fast	(New Zealand) Otago
88	Grant Elliott	21 March 1979 (aged 34)	45	Right	Right-arm medium	(New Zealand) Wellington
70	James Franklin	7 November 1980 (aged 32)	107	Left	Left-arm medium	(New Zealand) Wellington
31	Martin Guptill	30 September 1986 (aged 26)	72	Right	Right-arm off break	(New Zealand) Auckland
21	Mitchell McClenaghan	11 June 1986 (aged 26)	7	Left	Left-arm medium-fast	(New Zealand) Central Districts
15	Nathan McCullum	1 September 1980 (aged 32)	49	Right	Right-arm off break	(New Zealand) Otago
37	Kyle Mills	15 March 1979 (aged 34)	150	Right	Right-arm fast-medium	(New Zealand) Auckland
82	Colin Munro	11 March 1987 (aged 26)	3	Left	Right-arm medium-fast	(New Zealand) Auckland
54	Luke Ronchi (wk)	23 April 1981 (aged 32)	7	Right	—	(New Zealand) Wellington
38	Tim Southee	11 December 1988 (aged 24)	68	Right	Right-arm medium-fast	(New Zealand) Northern Districts
3	Ross Taylor	8 March 1984 (aged 29)	122	Right	Right-arm off break	(New Zealand) Central Districts
11	Daniel Vettori	27 January 1979 (aged 34)	272	Left	Slow left arm orthodox	(New Zealand) Northern Districts
22	Kane Williamson	8 August 1990 (aged 22)	42	Right	Right-arm off break	(New Zealand) Northern Districts
76	Corey Anderson	13 December 1990 (aged 22)	0	Left	Left-arm medium-fast	(New Zealand) Northern Districts

=== Sri Lanka ===
Coach: (South Africa) Graham Ford

No.	Player	Date of birth	ODIs	Batting	Bowling style	List A team
69	Angelo Mathews (c)	2 June 1987 (aged 26)	93	Right	Right-arm fast-medium	(Sri Lanka) Colts
17	Dinesh Chandimal	18 November 1989 (aged 23)	53	Right	Right-arm off break	(Sri Lanka) Nondescripts
23	Tillakaratne Dilshan	14 October 1976 (aged 36)	258	Right	Right-arm off break	(Sri Lanka) Bloomfield
95	Shaminda Eranga	23 June 1986 (aged 26)	5	Right	Right-arm fast-medium	(Sri Lanka) Tamil Union
14	Rangana Herath	19 March 1978 (aged 35)	40	Left	Slow left arm orthodox	(Sri Lanka) Tamil Union
27	Mahela Jayawardene	27 May 1977 (aged 36)	391	Right	Right-arm medium	(Sri Lanka) Sinhalese
92	Nuwan Kulasekara	22 July 1982 (aged 30)	134	Right	Right-arm fast-medium	(Sri Lanka) Colts
37	Dilhara Lokuhettige	3 July 1980 (aged 32)	8	Right	Right-arm fast-medium	(Sri Lanka) Ruhuna
99	Lasith Malinga	28 August 1983 (aged 29)	139	Right	Right-arm fast	(Sri Lanka) Nondescripts
9	Jeevan Mendis	15 January 1983 (aged 30)	35	Left	Leg break	(Sri Lanka) Bloomfield
8	Kusal Perera	17 August 1990 (aged 22)	7	Left	—	(Sri Lanka) Colts
1	Thisara Perera	3 April 1989 (aged 24)	56	Left	Right-arm medium-fast	(Sri Lanka) Colts
11	Kumar Sangakkara (wk)	27 October 1977 (aged 35)	340	Left	Right-arm off break	(Sri Lanka) Nondescripts
52	Sachithra Senanayake	9 February 1985 (aged 28)	10	Right	Right-arm off break	(Sri Lanka) Sinhalese
66	Lahiru Thirimanne	8 September 1989 (aged 23)	39	Left	Right-arm medium-fast	(Sri Lanka) Ragama

== Group B ==
=== India ===
Coach: (Zimbabwe) Duncan Fletcher

No.	Player	Date of birth	ODIs	Batting	Bowling style	List A team
7	Mahendra Singh Dhoni (c, wk)	7 July 1981 (aged 31)	219	Right	Right-arm medium	(India) Jharkhand
99	Ravichandran Ashwin	17 September 1986 (aged 26)	48	Right	Right-arm off break	(India) Tamil Nadu
25	Shikhar Dhawan	5 December 1985 (aged 27)	5	Left	Right-arm off break	(India) Delhi
8	Ravindra Jadeja	6 December 1988 (aged 24)	65	Left	Slow left arm orthodox	(India) Saurashtra
19	Dinesh Karthik	1 June 1985 (aged 28)	52	Right	—	(India) Tamil Nadu
18	Virat Kohli	5 November 1988 (aged 24)	98	Right	Right-arm medium	(India) Delhi
15	Bhuvneshwar Kumar	5 February 1990 (aged 23)	8	Right	Right-arm medium	(India) Uttar Pradesh
23	Vinay Kumar	12 February 1984 (aged 29)	22	Right	Right-arm Fast-medium	(India) Karnataka
9	Amit Mishra	24 November 1982 (aged 30)	15	Right	Leg break	(India) Haryana
56	Irfan Pathan	27 October 1984 (aged 28)	120	Left	Left-arm medium-fast	(India) Baroda
3	Suresh Raina	27 November 1986 (aged 26)	159	Left	Right-arm off break	(India) Uttar Pradesh
1	Ishant Sharma	2 September 1988 (aged 24)	55	Right	Right-arm fast-medium	(India) Delhi
45	Rohit Sharma	30 April 1987 (aged 26)	88	Right	Right-arm off break	(India) Mumbai
26	Murali Vijay	1 April 1984 (aged 29)	11	Right	Right-arm off break	(India) Tamil Nadu
73	Umesh Yadav	25 October 1987 (aged 25)	17	Right	Right-arm fast	(India) Vidarbha

=== Pakistan ===
Coach: (Australia) Dav Whatmore

No.	Player	Date of birth	ODIs	Batting	Bowling style	List A team
22	Misbah-ul-Haq (c)	28 May 1974 (aged 39)	117	Right	Leg break	(Pakistan) Sui Northern Gas Pipelines Limited
23	Kamran Akmal (vc) (wk)	13 January 1982 (aged 31)	151	Right	—	National Bank of Pakistan
36	Abdur Rehman	1 March 1980 (aged 32)	26	Left	Slow left arm orthodox	(Pakistan) Habib Bank Limited
72	Asad Ali	14 October 1988 (aged 24)	1	Right	Right-arm fast-medium	(Pakistan) Sui Northern Gas Pipelines Limited
81	Asad Shafiq	28 January 1986 (aged 27)	39	Right	Leg break	(Pakistan) Habib Bank Limited
66	Ehsan Adil	15 March 1993 (aged 20)	2	Right	Right-arm fast	(Pakistan) Habib Bank Limited
17	Imran Farhat	20 May 1982 (aged 31)	56	Left	Leg break	(Pakistan) Habib Bank Limited
83	Junaid Khan	24 December 1989 (aged 23)	24	Right	Left-arm fast	(Pakistan) Water and Power Development Authority
8	Mohammad Hafeez	17 October 1980 (aged 31)	118	Right	Right-arm off break	(Pakistan) Sui Northern Gas Pipelines Limited
76	Mohammad Irfan	6 June 1982 (aged 31)	11	Right	Left-arm medium-fast	(Pakistan) Khan Research Laboratories
77	Nasir Jamshed	6 December 1989 (aged 23)	28	Left	—	National Bank of Pakistan
50	Saeed Ajmal	14 October 1977 (aged 35)	81	Right	Right-arm off break	(Pakistan) Zarai Taraqiati Bank Ltd
6	Shoaib Malik	1 February 1982 (aged 31)	213	Right	Right-arm off break	Pakistan International Airlines
84	Umar Amin	16 October 1989 (aged 23)	4	Left	Right-arm medium	(Pakistan) Port Qasim Authority
47	Wahab Riaz	28 June 1985 (aged 27)	29	Right	Left-arm fast-medium	National Bank of Pakistan

=== South Africa ===
Coach: (South Africa) Gary Kirsten

No.	Player	Date of birth	ODIs	Batting	Bowling style	List A team
17	AB de Villiers (c, wk)	17 February 1984 (aged 29)	139	Right	Right-arm medium	(South Africa) Titans
1	Hashim Amla	31 March 1983 (aged 30)	69	Right	Right-arm medium, Right-arm off break	(South Africa) Cape Cobras
28	Farhaan Behardien	9 October 1983 (aged 29)	8	Right	Right-arm fast-medium	(South Africa) Titans
21	JP Duminy	14 April 1984 (aged 29)	95	Left	Right-arm off break	(South Africa) Cape Cobras
18	Faf du Plessis	13 July 1984 (aged 28)	33	Right	Leg break	(South Africa) Titans
41	Colin Ingram	3 July 1985 (aged 27)	24	Left	—	(South Africa) Warriors
9	Rory Kleinveldt	15 March 1983 (aged 30)	7	Right	Right-arm fast-medium	(South Africa) Cape Cobras
23	Ryan McLaren	9 February 1983 (aged 30)	22	Left	Right-arm medium-fast	(South Africa) Knights
10	David Miller	10 June 1989 (aged 23)	20	Left	Right-arm off break	(South Africa) Dolphins
65	Morné Morkel	6 October 1984 (aged 28)	60	Left	Right-arm fast	(South Africa) Titans
85	Alviro Petersen	25 November 1980 (aged 32)	18	Right	Right-arm off break	(South Africa) Highveld Lions
13	Robin Peterson	4 August 1979 (aged 33)	68	Left	Slow left arm orthodox	(South Africa) Warriors
69	Aaron Phangiso	21 January 1984 (aged 29)	1	Right	Slow left arm orthodox	(South Africa) Highveld Lions
8	Dale Steyn	27 June 1983 (aged 29)	72	Right	Right-arm fast	(South Africa) Cape Cobras
68	Lonwabo Tsotsobe	7 March 1984 (aged 29)	44	Right	Left-arm fast-medium	(South Africa) Warriors
25	Chris Morris	30 April 1987 (aged 26)	2	Right	Right-arm fast-medium	(South Africa) Highveld Lions

=== West Indies ===
Coach: (Barbados) Ottis Gibson

No.	Player	Date of birth	ODIs	Batting	Bowling style	List A team
47	Dwayne Bravo (c)	7 October 1983 (aged 29)	137	Right	Right-arm medium-fast	Trinidad and Tobago
80	Denesh Ramdin (vc, wk)	13 March 1985 (aged 28)	97	Right	—	Trinidad and Tobago
36	Tino Best	26 August 1981 (aged 31)	20	Right	Right-arm fast	Barbados
46	Darren Bravo	6 February 1989 (aged 24)	53	Left	Right-arm medium-fast	Trinidad and Tobago
25	Johnson Charles	14 January 1989 (aged 24)	11	Right	—	(Saint Lucia) Windward Islands
45	Chris Gayle	21 September 1979 (aged 33)	242	Left	Right-arm off break	Jamaica
98	Jason Holder	5 November 1991 (aged 21)	2	Right	Right-arm medium-fast	Barbados
74	Sunil Narine	26 May 1988 (aged 25)	28	Left	Right-arm off break	Trinidad and Tobago
55	Kieron Pollard	12 May 1987 (aged 26)	75	Right	Right-arm medium-fast	Trinidad and Tobago
14	Ravi Rampaul	15 October 1984 (aged 28)	73	Left	Right-arm fast-medium	Trinidad and Tobago
24	Kemar Roach	30 June 1988 (aged 24)	51	Right	Right-arm fast	Barbados
88	Darren Sammy	20 December 1983 (aged 29)	92	Right	Right-arm medium-fast	(Saint Lucia) Windward Islands
7	Marlon Samuels	5 January 1981 (aged 32)	142	Right	Right-arm off break	Jamaica
53	Ramnaresh Sarwan	23 June 1980 (aged 32)	179	Right	Leg break	Guyana
28	Devon Smith	21 October 1981 (aged 31)	42	Left	Right-arm off break	(Grenada) Windward Islands
