= History of cricket in South Africa from 2000–01 =

This article describes the history of South African cricket from the 2000–01 season. Noted South African players in the 21st century have included Jacques Kallis, Shaun Pollock, Makhaya Ntini, Mark Boucher, Graeme Smith and Herschelle Gibbs.

== Domestic cricket ==
In 2004–05 the SuperSport Series national championship was subject to a complete review designed to rebrand it and re-establish its popularity. Six new franchises were introduced to create a stronger top-tier of sides underpinned by a second-tier tournament that was based around the old provincial teams, who play in a provincial championship that is currently (2007–08) called the South African Airways Provincial Three-Day Challenge.

The rebranded SuperSport Series teams are:

- Cape Cobras in Cape Town and Paarl
- Dolphins in Durban
- Eagles in Bloemfontein
- Lions in Johannesburg and Potchefstroom
- Titans in Centurion, Gauteng and Benoni
- Warriors in Port Elizabeth and East London

=== SuperSport Series from 2000–01 ===
- 2000–01 Western Province
- 2001–02 KwaZulu-Natal
- 2002–03 Easterns
- 2003–04 Western Province

the competition was rebranded in 2004 with the introduction of franchise teams

- 2004–05 Eagles and Dolphins shared
- 2005–06 Dolphins and Titans shared
- 2006–07 Titans
- 2007–08 Eagles
- 2008–09 Titans
- 2009–10 Cape Cobras
- 2010–11

=== MTN Championship / Standard Bank Cup winners ===
- 2000–01 KwaZulu Natal
- 2001–02 KwaZulu Natal
- 2002–03 Western Province
- 2003–04 Gauteng
- 2004–05 Eagles
- 2005–06 Eagles
- 2006–07 Cape Cobras
- 2007–08 Titans
- 2008–09 Titans
- 2009–10 Warriors
- 2010–11

=== Pro20 Series (Twenty20) winners ===
- 2003–04 Eagles
- 2004–05 Titans
- 2005–06 Eagles
- 2006–07 Lions
- 2007–08 Titans
- 2008–09 Cape Cobras
- 2009–10 Warriors
- 2010–11

=== Provincial Three-Day Challenge winners ===
This is a first-class championship for the provincial teams and so is effectively the descendant of the old Currie Cup.

It was called the UCB Provincial Cup in 2004–05 and then its name was changed to South African Airways Provincial Three-Day Challenge. Winners have been:

- 2004–05 Griqualand West; runners up Border
- 2005–06 Northerns; runners-up Western Province
- 2006–07 Gauteng; runners-up Easterns
- 2007–08 Griqualand West; runners up Western Province
- 2008–09 Griqualand West; runners up North West
- 2009–10 Easterns; runners up Gauteng
- 2010–11

== International tours ==
=== 2000–01, New Zealand ===
- 1st Test at Goodyear Park, Bloemfontein – South Africa won by 5 wickets
- 2nd Test at St George's Park, Port Elizabeth – South Africa won by 7 wickets
- 3rd Test at New Wanderers Stadium, Johannesburg – match drawn

=== 2001–02, India ===
- 1st Test at Goodyear Park, Bloemfontein – South Africa won by 9 wickets
- 2nd Test at St George's Park, Port Elizabeth – match drawn

=== 2001–02, Australia ===
- 1st Test at New Wanderers Stadium, Johannesburg – Australia won by an innings and 360 runs
- 2nd Test at Newlands Cricket Ground, Cape Town – Australia won by 4 wickets
- 3rd Test at Kingsmead, Durban – South Africa won by 5 wickets

=== 2002–03, Bangladesh ===
- 1st Test at Buffalo Park, East London – South Africa won by an innings and 107 runs
- 2nd Test at North West Cricket Stadium, Potchefstroom – South Africa won by an innings and 160 runs

=== 2002–03, Pakistan ===
- 1st Test at Kingsmead, Durban – South Africa won by 10 wickets
- 2nd Test at Newlands Cricket Ground, Cape Town – South Africa won by an innings and 142 runs

=== 2003–04, West Indies ===
- 1st Test at New Wanderers Stadium, Johannesburg – South Africa won by 189 runs
- 2nd Test at Kingsmead, Durban – South Africa won by an innings and 65 runs
- 3rd Test at Newlands Cricket Ground, Cape Town – match drawn
- 4th Test at Centurion Park – South Africa won by 10 wickets

=== 2004–05, England ===
- 1st Test at St George's Park, Port Elizabeth – England won by 7 wickets
- 2nd Test at Kingsmead, Durban – match drawn
- 3rd Test at Newlands Cricket Ground, Cape Town – South Africa won by 196 runs
- 4th Test at New Wanderers Stadium, Johannesburg – England won by 77 runs
- 5th Test at Centurion Park – match drawn

=== 2004–05, Zimbabwe ===
- 1st Test at Newlands Cricket Ground, Cape Town – South Africa won by an innings and 21 runs
- 2nd Test at Centurion Park – South Africa won by an innings and 62 runs

=== 2005–06, Australia ===
- 1st Test at Newlands Cricket Ground, Cape Town – Australia won by 7 wickets
- 2nd Test at Kingsmead, Durban – Australia won by 112 runs
- 3rd Test at New Wanderers Stadium, Johannesburg – Australia won by 2 wickets

For details of the famous high-scoring LOI, see : Australia in South Africa, 5th ODI, 2006

=== 2005–06, New Zealand ===
- 1st Test at Centurion Park – South Africa won by 128 runs
- 2nd Test at Newlands Cricket Ground, Cape Town – match drawn
- 3rd Test at New Wanderers Stadium, Johannesburg – South Africa won by 4 wickets

=== 2006–07, India ===
- 1st Test at New Wanderers Stadium, Johannesburg – India won by 123 runs
- 2nd Test at Kingsmead, Durban – South Africa won by 174 runs
- 3rd Test at Newlands Cricket Ground, Cape Town – South Africa won by 5 wickets

=== 2006–07, Pakistan ===
- 1st Test at Centurion Park – South Africa won by 7 wickets
- 2nd Test at St George's Park, Port Elizabeth – Pakistan won by 5 wickets
- 3rd Test at Newlands Cricket Ground, Cape Town – South Africa won by 5 wickets

== External sources ==
- CricketArchive – the itinerary of South African cricket

== Bibliography ==
- South African Cricket Annual – various editions
- Wisden Cricketers' Almanack – 1864 to present (best for reviews from 2001 season)
