= 2012–13 Momentum One Day Cup =

- Dates: 2 November 2012 – 15 December 2012
- Administrator(s): Cricket South Africa
- Cricket format: List A
- Tournament format(s): Double round-robin and playoffs
- Champions: Cape Cobras; Lions
- Participants: 6
- Most runs: Richard Levi (Cape Cobras) 620
- Most wickets: Andrew Birch (Warriors) 23

The 2012–13 Momentum One Day Cup was a domestic one-day cricket championship in South Africa. It was the 32nd time the championship was contested. The competition was played over 5 weeks, starting with the first match on 2 November 2012 and finishing with the final on 15 December 2012 at the Wanderers Stadium in Johannesburg. The trophy was shared by the Cape Cobras and Lions when the two attempts at playing the final were both abandoned due to rain. The first match saw the Cobras batting first, but was abandoned during the 17th over of their innings. The second match saw the Lions bat first and make 241/7 in their innings, but rain ended the match with the Cobras 69/2 after 11 overs, fewer than the 20 overs required for a Duckworth–Lewis calculation to be applied.

== Group stage ==
=== Points table ===
Pos	Team	Pld	W	L	NR	BP	Ded	Pts	NRR
1	Lions (W)	10	5	2	3	4	0	30	1.923
2	Cape Cobras (W)	10	6	3	1	3	0	29	0.749
3	Titans (3)	10	5	5	0	1	0	21	−0.625
4	Knights	10	3	4	3	2	0	20	−0.779
5	Dolphins	10	3	4	3	1	1	18	−0.115
6	Warriors	10	2	6	2	1	2	11	−0.618

Source: Cricinfo

== Knockout stage ==
Of the 6 participants, the following 3 teams qualified for the knockout stage:

Semifinal			Final
			2	Cape Cobras	64/4 (match 1); 69/2 (match 2)
3	Titans	241/9	1	Lions	DNB (match 1); 241/7 (match 2)
2	Cape Cobras	245/7

=== Semi-final ===
9 December 2012
Scorecard

Titans; 241/9 (50 overs)	v	Cape Cobras; 245/7 (46.3 overs)
AB de Villiers 107 (123); Dale Steyn 5/45 (10 overs)		Justin Ontong 82* (81); Roelof van der Merwe 4/29 (10 overs)

Cape Cobras won by 3 wickets
Newlands, Cape Town
Umpires: Marais Erasmus and Shaun George
Player of the match: Dale Steyn (Cape Cobras)

=== Final ===
14 December 2012
Scorecard

Cape Cobras; 64/4 (5.5 overs)	v	Lions
Yaseen Vallie 21* (27); Hardus Viljoen 4/37 (7 overs)

No result
The Wanderers, Johannesburg
Umpires: Marais Erasmus and Johan Cloete

- Match abandoned after 16.2 overs due to rain. The match was replayed the following day.

15 December 2012
Scorecard

Lions; 241/4 (50 overs)	v	Cape Cobras; 69/2 (11 overs)
Alviro Petersen 56 (89); Rory Kleinveldt 3/41 (10 overs)		Richard Levi 36 (25); Imran Tahir 2/2 (2 overs)

No result
The Wanderers, Johannesburg
Umpires: Marais Erasmus and Johan Cloete

- Match abandoned after 11 overs of the Cobras' innings due to rain
- Trophy shared

== Statistics ==
=== Most Runs ===
Player	Team	Runs	Matches	I	NO	Highest score	Avg	Balls faced	Strike rate	100s	50s	0s	Fours	Sixes
Richard Levi	(South Africa) Cape Cobras	620	12	12	1	166	56.36	576	107.63	1	4	0	79	12
Stephen Cook	(South Africa) Lions	458'	11	9	1	125	57.25	505	90.69	2	2	0	47	4
Henry Davids	(South Africa) Titans	450	11	11	0	166	40.90	496	90.72	1	3	2	33	13
Heino Kuhn	(South Africa) Titans	394	10	10	0	107	39.40	437	90.16	1	3	0	44	4
Vaughn van Jaarsveld	(South Africa) Dolphins	373	9	8	2	116	62.16	496	75.20	1	3	0	41	3

Source: Cricinfo

=== Most Wickets ===
Player	Team	Wickets	Matches	Overs	Maidens	Runs	Best Figures	Avg	Econ	SR	5W
Andrew Birch	(South Africa) Warriors	23	10	83.4	10	386	4/28	16.78	4.61	21.8	0
Roelof van der Merwe	(South Africa) Titans	22	11	93.3	0	439	5/26	19.95	4.69	25.5	2
Hardus Viljoen	(South Africa) Lions	20	8	57.5	8	268	6/19	13.40	4.63	17.3	1
Ryan McLaren	(South Africa) Knights	15	6	50.3	6	226	5/38	15.06	4.47	20.2	1
Johann Louw	(South Africa) Cape Cobras	14	11	90.0	6	407	3/24	29.07	4.52	38.5	0

Source: Cricinfo
