= 2009–10 MTN Domestic Championship =

- Dates: 28 October 2009 – 29 January 2010
- Administrator(s): Cricket South Africa
- Cricket format: List A
- Tournament format(s): Double round-robin and playoffs
- Champions: Warriors
- Participants: 6
- Most runs: Colin Ingram (Warriors) 600
- Most wickets: Rusty Theron (Warriors) 21

The 2009/10 MTN40 was a domestic List A cricket championship in South Africa. This was the 29th time the championship was contested. Each team plays each other twice in a home and away leg. The top four teams progress to the semi-finals, with the winners of the semi-finals going through to the final. Cricket South Africa has introduced trial rule changes; 40 overs per side, the batting team choosing powerplays, 12 players per side (rolling subs). The tournament has been rebranded from the MTN Domestic Championship to the MTN 40.

The competition started on 28 October 2009 and the final took place on 29 January 2010.

== Teams ==
- Nashua Cape Cobras in Cape Town & Paarl
- Nashua Dolphins in Durban & Pietermaritzburg
- Gestetner Diamond Eagles in Bloemfontein & Kimberley
- bizhub Highveld Lions in Johannesburg and Potchefstroom
- Nashua Titans in Centurion & Benoni
- Chevrolet Warriors in East London & Port Elizabeth

== Stadiums ==
Stadium	City	Capacity	Home Team
Sahara Park Newlands	Cape Town	25 000	Nashua Cape Cobras
Boland Park	Paarl	10 000	Nashua Cape Cobras
Sahara Stadium Kingsmead	Durban	25 000	Nashua Dolphins
Pietermaritzburg Oval	Pietermaritzburg	12 000	Nashua Dolphins
OUTsurance Oval	Bloemfontein	20 000	Gestetner Diamond Eagles
De Beers Diamond Oval	Kimberley	11 000	Gestetner Diamond Eagles
Liberty Life Wanderers Stadium	Johannesburg	34 000	bizhub Highveld Lions
Senwes Park	Potchefstroom	9 000	bizhub Highveld Lions
Willowmoore Park	Benoni	20 000	Nashua Titans
Supersport Park	Centurion	20 000	Nashua Titans
Sahara Oval St George's	Port Elizabeth	19 000	Chevrolet Warriors
Buffalo Park	East London	15 000	Chevrolet Warriors

== Group stage ==
=== Points table ===
2009/10 MTN 40
Pos	Team	Pld	W	L	T	NR	BP	Ded	Pts	NRR	For	Against
1	Nashua Titans	10	7	1	0	2	2	0	34	0.592	1888/306.1	1784/320
2	Nashua Cape Cobras	10	7	2	0	1	3	0	33	0.585	2264/352	2099/359
3	Chevrolet Warriors	10	5	5	0	0	1	1	20	0.004	2157/378.5	2168/381
4	Nashua Dolphins	10	3	6	0	1	0	0	14	−0.271	1957/348.3	2027/344.2
5	Gestetner Diamond Eagles	10	3	7	0	0	1	0	13	−0.018	2433/388	2397/381.1
6	bizhub Highveld Lions	10	3	7	0	0	0	0	12	−0.800	2266/381.1	2490/369.1

=== Point system ===
- Win: 4 points
- Tie, no result or abandoned: 2 points
- Loss: 0 points
- Bonus points: 1 point awarded if the run rate is sufficiently higher than that of the opposition.

== Knockout stage ==
=== Semi-finals ===
22 January 2010
Report

Warriors; 274/4 (40 overs)	v	Cape Cobras; 265/8 (40 overs)
Jacques Kallis 73 (55 balls); Robin Peterson 1/30 (7 overs)		Justin Kemp 71 (55 balls); Rusty Theron 4/48 (8 overs)

Warriors won by 9 runs
Boland Park, Paarl
Umpires: Z Ndamane & D Smith
Player of the match: Jacques Kallis (Warriors)

24 January 2010
Report

Dolphins; 251/6 (40 overs)	v	Titans; 236/9 (40 overs)
Hashim Amla 59 (58 balls); Ethy Mbhalati 2/51 (8 overs)		AB de Villiers 61 (66 balls); Daryn Smit 2/35 (7 overs)

Dolphins won by 15 runs
SuperSport Park, Centurion
Umpires: MW Brown & S George

=== Final ===
29 January 2010
Report

Warriors; 299/4 (40 overs)	v	Dolphins; 228 (36.4 overs)
Ashwell Prince 128 (96 balls); Andrew Hall 2/71 (8 overs)		Hashim Amla 68 (69 balls); Wayne Parnell 3/27 (7 overs)

Warriors won by 71 runs
Buffalo Park, East London
Umpires: MW Brown & S George
Player of the match: Ashwell Prince (Warriors)
