= 2019 Cricket World Cup squads =

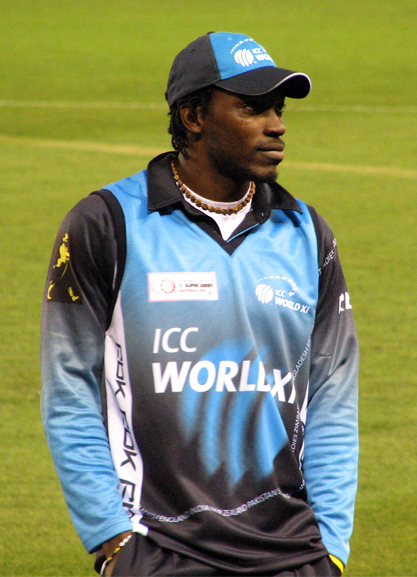
Chris Gayle, of the West Indies, was selected to play in his fifth Cricket World Cup.

This is a list of the squads picked for the 2019 Cricket World Cup. All 10 teams were required to submit a 15-member squad by 23 April, 2019 with changes to the squad allowed to be made up to 22 May. New Zealand were the first team to name their squad, naming their team on 3 April 2019. The West Indies were the last team to name their squad, announcing their team on 24 April 2019, one day after the initial deadline set by the International Cricket Council (ICC).

Two cricketers, New Zealand's Tom Blundell and Bangladesh's Abu Jayed, had not played in a One Day International (ODI) prior to being named in their team's squad. On 13 May 2019, Jayed made his ODI debut against the West Indies, in the fifth match of the tri-series in Ireland. Three captains, England's Eoin Morgan, the West Indies' Jason Holder and Bangladesh's Mashrafe Mortaza, had led their respective teams in the previous tournament.

== Key ==
Symbol	Meaning
S/N	Shirt number of the player in ODI
Player	Player name, as used on their own Wikipedia article. Also shows if they are team's designated captain or vice-captain.
Date of birth	Date of birth, and age as of 30 May 2019.
ODIs	The number of One Day Internationals played as of 30 May 2019. (Note: This figure is inclusive of appearances for current national team, a previous national team, ACA African XI, ACC Asian XI, and the ICC World XI.)
Role	Bowler, batter, all-rounder or wicket-keeper
Batting	Hand they bat with
Bowling style	Type(s) of bowling employed
List A or domestic team	Either List A team, or domestic one-day team if the country's one-day matches do not have List A status.

== Afghanistan ==
Afghanistan announced their 15-man squad on 22 April. Following Afghanistan's second match, Mohammad Shahzad was ruled out of the tournament due to injury. He was replaced by Ikram Alikhil. On 27 June 2019, Aftab Alam was ruled out of the tournament due to "exceptional circumstances" and was replaced by Sayed Shirzad.

Coach: (Cricket West Indies) Phil Simmons

S/N	Player	Date of birth (age)	ODIs	Role	Batting	Bowling style	List A or domestic team
14	Gulbadin Naib (c)	16 March 1991 (aged 28)	55	All-rounder	Right	Right-arm medium-fast	Mis Ainak Region
19	Rashid Khan (vc)	20 September 1998 (aged 20)	59	Bowler	Right	Right-arm leg spin	Speen Ghar Region
55	Aftab Alam	30 November 1992 (aged 26)	24	All-rounder	Right	Right-arm medium-fast	Speen Ghar Region
44	Asghar Afghan	22 February 1987 (aged 32)	102	Batsman	Right	Right-arm off spin	Kabul Region
10	Dawlat Zadran	19 March 1988 (aged 31)	77	Bowler	Right	Right-arm fast	Amo Region
66	Hamid Hassan	1 June 1987 (aged 31)	33	Bowler	Right	Right-arm fast	Band-e-Amir Region
50	Hashmatullah Shahidi	4 November 1994 (aged 24)	31	Batsman	Left	Right-arm off spin	Band-e-Amir Region
3	Hazratullah Zazai	23 March 1998 (aged 21)	8	Batsman	Left	Left-arm orthodox	Band-e-Amir Region
7	Mohammad Nabi	3 March 1985 (aged 34)	112	All-rounder	Right	Right-arm off spin	Amo Region
77	Mohammad Shahzad (wk)	31 January 1988 (aged 31)	82	Wicket-keeper	Right	—	Speen Ghar Region
88	Mujeeb Ur Rahman	28 March 2001 (aged 18)	30	Bowler	Right	Right-arm off spin	Speen Ghar Region
1	Najibullah Zadran	18 February 1993 (aged 26)	56	Batsman	Left	Right-arm off spin	Boost Region
15	Noor Ali Zadran	10 July 1988 (aged 30)	48	Batsman	Right	Right-arm medium-fast	Mis Ainak Region
8	Rahmat Shah	16 March 1991 (aged 28)	61	Batsman	Right	Right-arm leg spin	Mis Ainak Region
45	Samiullah Shinwari	31 December 1987 (aged 31)	81	All-rounder	Right	Right-arm leg spin	Boost Region

== Australia ==
Australia announced their 15-man squad on 15 April. Jhye Richardson was originally included in the squad but on 8 May 2019, he was ruled out of the tournament with a dislocated shoulder and replaced by Kane Richardson. Cricket Australia named Mitchell Marsh as cover for Marcus Stoinis, ahead of Australia's match against Pakistan on 12 June 2019. Stoinis was ruled out of the fixture due to an injury, with Cricket Australia waiting to see if he's ruled out of the rest of the tournament. Ahead of Australia's final group-stage match, Shaun Marsh was ruled out of the rest of the tournament with a fractured forearm. Peter Handscomb was named as his replacement. Usman Khawaja picked up a hamstring injury during Australia's final group-stage match, ruling him out of the rest of the tournament. Matthew Wade was named as cover for him.

Coach: (Australia) Justin Langer

S/N	Player	Date of birth (age)	ODIs	Role	Batting	Bowling style	List A or domestic team
5	Aaron Finch (c)	17 November 1986 (aged 32)	109	Batsman	Right	Left-arm orthodox	Victoria
4	Alex Carey (vc, wk)	27 August 1991 (aged 27)	19	Wicket-keeper	Left	—	South Australia
30	Pat Cummins (vc)	8 May 1993 (aged 26)	48	All-rounder	Right	Right-arm fast	New South Wales Blues
65	Jason Behrendorff	20 April 1990 (aged 28)	2	Bowling all rounder	Right	right arm fast-medium	{{{domestic team}}}
6	Nathan Mitchell Coulter-Nile	11 October 1987 (aged 31)	32	Bowler	Right	Right-arm fast	Western Warriors
1	Usman Khawaja	18 December 1986 (aged 32)	31	Batsman	Left	Right-arm off spin	Queensland Bulls
67	Nathan Lyon	20 November 1987 (aged 31)	25	Bowler	Right	Right-arm off spin	New South Wales Blues
9	Shaun Marsh	9 July 1983 (aged 35)	71	Batsman	Left	Left-arm orthodox	Western Warriors
32	Glenn Maxwell	14 October 1988 (aged 30)	100	All-rounder	Right	Right-arm off spin	Victoria
47	Kane Richardson	12 February 1991 (aged 28)	20	Bowler	Right	Right-arm fast-medium	South Australia
49	Steve Smith	2 June 1989 (aged 29)	108	Batsman	Right	Right-arm leg spin	New South Wales Blues
56	Mitchell Starc	30 January 1990 (aged 29)	75	Bowler	Left	Left-arm fast	New South Wales Blues
17	Marcus Stoinis	16 August 1989 (aged 29)	33	All-rounder	Right	Right-arm medium	Western Warriors
31	David Warner	27 October 1986 (aged 32)	106	Batsman	Left	Right-arm leg spin	New South Wales Blues
63	Adam Zampa	31 March 1992 (aged 27)	44	Bowler	Right	Right-arm leg spin	South Australia
60	~~Jhye Richardson~~	20 September 1996 (aged 22)	12	Bowler	Right	Right-arm fast	Western Warriors

== Bangladesh ==
Bangladesh announced their 15-man squad on 16 April.

Coach: (England) Steve Rhodes

S/N	Player	Date of birth (age)	ODIs	Role	Batting	Bowling style	List A or domestic team
2	Mashrafe Mortaza (c)	5 October 1983 (aged 35)	209	Bowler	Right	Right-arm medium	Abahani Limited
75	Shakib Al Hasan (vc)	24 March 1987 (aged 32)	198	All-rounder	Left	Left-arm orthodox	Abahani Limited
28	Tamim Iqbal	20 March 1989 (aged 30)	193	Batsman	Left	Right-arm off spin	Mohammedan Sporting
16	Litton Das	13 October 1994 (aged 24)	28	Wicket-keeper	Right	—	Mohammedan Sporting
15	Mushfiqur Rahim (wk)	9 May 1987 (aged 32)	205	Wicket-keeper	Right	Right-arm medium	Legends of Rupganj
30	Mahmudullah	4 February 1986 (aged 33)	175	Batsman	Right	Right arm off spin	Abahani Limited
8	Mohammad Mithun	13 February 1990 (aged 29)	18	Batsman	Right	—	Abahani Limited
1	Sabbir Rahman	22 November 1991 (aged 27)	61	Batsman	Right	Right arm leg spin	Abahani Limited
53	Mehidy Hasan	25 October 1996 (aged 22)	28	All-rounder	Right	Right-arm off spin	Abahani Limited
59	Soumya Sarkar	25 February 1993 (aged 26)	44	All-rounder	Left	Right-arm medium	Abahani Limited
34	Rubel Hossain	1 January 1990 (aged 29)	97	Bowler	Right	Right-arm fast	Abahani Limited
74	Mohammad Saifuddin	1 September 1996 (aged 22)	13	All-rounder	Left	Right-arm medium-fast	Abahani Limited
32	Mosaddek Hossain	10 December 1995 (aged 23)	26	All-rounder	Right	Right-arm off spin	Abahani Limited
90	Mustafizur Rahman	6 September 1995 (aged 23)	46	Bowler	Left	Left-arm fast-medium	Shinepukur
17	Abu Jayed	2 August 1993 (aged 25)	2	Bowler	Right	Right-arm fast-medium	Prime Doleshwar

== England ==
England announced their 15-men squad on 17 April. It originally included Alex Hales, though he was later withdrawn following a ban for recreational drug use. England announced their final squad on 21 May, with Jofra Archer, Liam Dawson and James Vince replacing David Willey, Joe Denly and Alex Hales.

Coach: (Australia) Trevor Bayliss

S/N	Player	Date of birth (age)	ODIs	Role	Batting	Bowling style	List A or domestic team
16	Eoin Morgan (c)	10 September 1986 (aged 32)	222	Batsman	Left	Right-arm medium	Middlesex
63	Jos Buttler (vc, wk)	8 September 1990 (aged 28)	131	Wicket-keeper	Right	—	Lancashire
18	Moeen Ali	18 June 1987 (aged 31)	96	All-rounder	Left	Right-arm off spin	Worcestershire
22	Jofra Archer	1 April 1995 (aged 24)	3	Bowler	Right	Right-arm fast	Sussex
51	Jonny Bairstow	26 September 1989 (aged 29)	63	Wicket-keeper	Right	—	Yorkshire
59	Tom Curran	12 March 1995 (aged 24)	17	Bowler	Right	Right-arm fast-medium	Surrey
83	Liam Dawson	1 March 1990 (aged 29)	3	All-rounder	Right	Left-arm orthodox	Hampshire
17	Liam Plunkett	6 April 1985 (aged 34)	82	Bowler	Right	Right-arm fast	Surrey
95	Adil Rashid	17 February 1988 (aged 31)	88	Bowler	Right	Right-arm leg spin	Yorkshire
66	Joe Root	30 December 1990 (aged 28)	132	Batsman	Right	Right-arm off/leg spin	Yorkshire
20	Jason Roy	21 July 1990 (aged 28)	76	Batsman	Right	—	Surrey
55	Ben Stokes	4 June 1991 (aged 27)	84	All-rounder	Left	Right-arm fast-medium	Durham
14	James Vince	14 March 1991 (aged 28)	10	Batsman	Right	Right-arm medium	Hampshire
19	Chris Woakes	2 March 1989 (aged 30)	88	All-rounder	Right	Right-arm fast-medium	Warwickshire
33	Mark Wood	11 January 1990 (aged 29)	41	Bowler	Right	Right-arm fast	Durham
24	~~Joe Denly~~	16 March 1986 (aged 33)	13	All-rounder	Right	Right-arm leg spin	Kent
10	~~Alex Hales~~	3 January 1989 (aged 30)	70	Batsman	Right	Right-arm medium	Nottinghamshire
15	~~David Willey~~	28 February 1990 (aged 29)	46	All-rounder	Left	Left-arm fast-medium	Yorkshire

== India ==
India announced their 15-man squad on 15 April. They have also named Ambati Rayudu, Rishabh Pant, Axar Patel, Navdeep Saini and Ishant Sharma as stand-by players for the team, who can be drafted in the event of injuries to any player. Rishabh Pant was called up to India's squad as cover for Shikhar Dhawan, after Dhawan suffered a hairline fracture on his left thumb during India's game against Australia. On 19 June 2019, the Board of Control for Cricket in India (BCCI) confirmed that Dhawan had been ruled out for the rest of the tournament, with Pant confirmed as his replacement. Vijay Shankar was ruled out of India's final two round-robin matches due to an injury, with Mayank Agarwal named as his replacement.

Coach: (India) Ravi Shastri

S/N	Player	Date of birth (age)	ODIs	Role	Batting	Bowling style	List A or domestic team
18	Virat Kohli (c)	5 November 1988 (aged 30)	227	Batsman	Right	Right-arm medium	Delhi
45	Rohit Sharma (vc)	30 April 1987 (aged 32)	206	Batsman	Right	Right-arm off spin	Mumbai
7	MS Dhoni (wk)	7 July 1981 (aged 37)	341	Wicket-keeper	Right	Right-arm medium	Jharkhand
1	KL Rahul (wk)	18 April 1992 (aged 27)	14	Wicket-keeper	Right	Right arm medium	Karnataka
21	Dinesh Karthik (wk)	1 June 1985 (aged 33)	91	Wicket-keeper	Right	Right arm off spin	Tamil Nadu
56	Rishabh Pant	4 October 1997 (aged 21)	45	Wicket-keeper	left	Right arm medium	Delhi
25	Shikhar Dhawan	5 December 1985 (aged 33)	128	Batsman	Left	Right-arm off spin	Delhi
59	Vijay Shankar	26 January 1991 (aged 28)	9	All-rounder	Right	Right-arm medium	Tamil Nadu
81	Kedar Jadhav	26 March 1985 (aged 34)	31	Allrounder	Right	Right-arm off spin	Maharashtra
3	Yuzvendra Chahal	23 July 1990 (aged 28)	41	Bowler	Right	Right-arm leg spin	Haryana
23	Kuldeep Yadav	14 December 1994 (aged 24)	44	Bowler	Left	Left-arm unorthodox	Uttar Pradesh
15	Bhuvneshwar Kumar	5 February 1990 (aged 29)	105	Bowler	Right	Right-arm medium-fast	Uttar Pradesh
93	Jasprit Bumrah	6 December 1993 (aged 25)	49	Bowler	Right	Right-arm fast	Gujarat
33	Hardik Pandya	11 October 1993 (aged 25)	45	All-rounder	Right	Right arm medium-fast	Baroda
8	Ravindra Jadeja	6 December 1988 (aged 30)	151	All-rounder	Left	Left-arm orthodox	Saurashtra
11	Mohammed Shami	3 September 1990 (aged 28)	63	Bowler	Right	Right-arm fast	Bengal

== New Zealand ==
New Zealand announced their 15-man squad on 3 April 2019.

Coach: (New Zealand) Gary Stead

S/N	Player	Date of birth (age)	ODIs	Role	Batting	Bowling style	List A or domestic team
22	Kane Williamson (c)	8 August 1990 (aged 28)	139	Batsman	Right	Right-arm off spin	Northern Districts
48	Tom Latham (vc, wk)	2 April 1992 (aged 27)	85	Wicket-keeper	Left	Right-arm medium	Canterbury
38	Tim Southee	11 December 1988 (aged 30)	139	Bowler	Right	Right-arm medium-fast	Northern Districts
78	Tom Blundell (wk)	1 September 1990 (aged 29)	7	Wicket-keeper	Right	Right-arm off break	Wellington Firebirds
18	Trent Boult	22 July 1989 (aged 29)	79	Bowler	Right	Left-arm fast-medium	Northern Districts
77	Colin de Grandhomme	22 July 1986 (aged 32)	28	All-rounder	Right	Right-arm fast-medium	Northern Districts
87	Lockie Ferguson	13 June 1991 (aged 27)	27	Bowler	Right	Right-arm fast	Auckland Aces
31	Martin Guptill	30 September 1986 (aged 32)	169	Batsman	Right	Right-arm off spin	Auckland Aces
21	Matt Henry	14 December 1991 (aged 27)	43	Bowler	Right	Right-arm fast-medium	Canterbury
82	Colin Munro	11 March 1987 (aged 32)	51	Batsman	Left	Right-arm medium	Auckland Aces
50	James Neesham	17 September 1990 (aged 28)	49	All-rounder	Left	Right-arm medium	Wellington Firebirds
86	Henry Nicholls	15 November 1991 (aged 27)	41	Batsman	Left	Right-arm off spin	Canterbury
74	Mitchell Santner	5 February 1992 (aged 27)	59	All-rounder	Left	Left-arm orthodox	Northern Districts
67	Ish Sodhi	31 October 1992 (aged 26)	52	Bowler	Right	Right-arm leg break	Northern Districts
3	Ross Taylor	8 March 1984 (aged 35)	218	Batsman	Right	Right-arm off break	Central Stags

== Pakistan ==
Pakistan announced their initial World Cup squad on 18 April. They announced their final squad on 20 May, with Junaid Khan, Faheem Ashraf and Abid Ali replaced by Wahab Riaz, Mohammad Amir and Asif Ali.

Coach: (South Africa) Mickey Arthur

S/N	Player	Date of birth (age)	ODIs	Role	Batting	Bowling style	List A or domestic team
54	Sarfaraz Ahmed (c, wk)	22 May 1987 (aged 32)	106	Wicket-keeper	Right	Right-arm off spin	Sindh
56	Babar Azam (vc)	15 October 1994 (aged 24)	64	Batsman	Right	Right-arm off spin	Islamabad
45	Asif Ali	1 October 1991 (aged 27)	16	Batsman	Right	Right-arm medium-fast	Sindh
39	Fakhar Zaman	10 April 1990 (aged 29)	36	Batsman	Left	Left-arm orthodox	Federally Administered Tribal Areas
89	Haris Sohail	15 October 1989 (aged 29)	34	Batsman	Left	Left-arm orthodox	Federal Areas
26	Imam-ul-Haq	12 December 1995 (aged 23)	28	Batsman	Left	Right-arm leg spin	Habib Bank
8	Mohammad Hafeez	17 October 1980 (aged 38)	210	All-rounder	Right	Right arm off spin	Sui Northern Gas Pipelines
29	Shadab Khan	4 October 1998 (aged 20)	34	All-rounder	Right	Right-arm leg spin	Khyber Pakhtunkhwa
18	Shoaib Malik	1 February 1982 (aged 37)	284	All-rounder	Right	Right-arm off spin	Punjab
9	Imad Wasim	18 December 1988 (aged 30)	46	All-rounder	Left	Left-arm orthodox	Islamabad
32	Hasan Ali	7 February 1994 (aged 25)	49	Bowler	Right	Right-arm fast medium	Islamabad
5	Mohammad Amir	13 April 1992 (aged 27)	51	Bowler	Left	Left-arm fast	Sui Southern Gas Company
87	Mohammad Hasnain	5 April 2000 (aged 19)	5	Bowler	Right	Right-arm fast-medium	Sindh
40	Shaheen Afridi	6 April 2000 (aged 19)	14	Bowler	Left	Left-arm fast	Baluchistan
47	Wahab Riaz	28 June 1985 (aged 33)	79	Bowler	Right	Left-arm fast	Khyber Pakhtunkhwa
60	~~Abid Ali~~	16 October 1987 (aged 31)	3	Batsman	Right	Right-arm leg spin	Khyber Pakhtunkhwa
41	~~Faheem Ashraf~~	16 January 1994 (aged 25)	23	All-rounder	Left	Right-arm fast-medium	Faisalabad
83	~~Junaid Khan~~	24 December 1989 (aged 29)	76	Bowler	Right	Left-arm fast	Sindh

== South Africa ==
South Africa announced their World Cup squad on 18 April. Anrich Nortje was originally included in the squad but on 7 May 2019, he was ruled out of the tournament with a hand injury and replaced by Chris Morris. Dale Steyn was ruled out of the tournament due to an ongoing shoulder injury, and was replaced by Beuran Hendricks.

Coach: (Cricket West Indies) Ottis Gibson

S/N	Player	Date of birth (age)	ODIs	Role	Batting	Bowling style	List A or domestic team
18	Faf du Plessis (c)	13 July 1984 (aged 34)	134	Batsman	Right	Right-arm leg spin	Titans
12	Quinton de Kock (vc, wk)	17 December 1992 (aged 26)	106	Wicket-keeper	Left	Left-arm orthodox	Titans
1	Hashim Amla	31 March 1983 (aged 36)	174	Batsman	Right	Right-arm off spin	Cape Cobras
4	Aiden Markram	4 October 1994 (aged 24)	18	Batsman	Right	Right-arm off spin	Titans
72	Rassie van der Dussen	7 February 1989 (aged 30)	9	Batsman	Right	Right-arm leg spin	Lions
10	David Miller	10 June 1989 (aged 29)	120	Batsman	Left	Right-arm off spin	Dolphins
21	JP Duminy	14 April 1984 (aged 35)	194	All-rounder	Left	Right arm off spin	Cape Cobras
23	Andile Phehlukwayo	3 March 1996 (aged 23)	36	All-rounder	Left	Right-arm fast-medium	Dolphins
29	Dwaine Pretorius	29 March 1989 (aged 30)	19	All-rounder	Right	Right-arm fast-medium	Lions
8	Dale Steyn	27 June 1983 (aged 35)	125	Bowler	Right	Right-arm fast	Titans
25	Kagiso Rabada	25 May 1995 (aged 24)	64	Bowler	Left	Right-arm fast	Lions
22	Lungi Ngidi	29 March 1996 (aged 23)	13	Bowler	Right	Right-arm fast	Titans
20	~~Anrich Nortje~~	16 November 1993 (aged 25)	4	Bowler	Right	Right-arm fast	Warriors
2	Chris Morris	30 April 1987 (aged 32)	34	All-rounder	Right	Right-arm fast-medium	Titans
99	Imran Tahir	27 March 1979 (aged 40)	98	Bowler	Right	Right-arm leg spin	Dolphins
26	Tabraiz Shamsi	18 February 1990 (aged 29)	5	Bowler	Right	Left-arm wrist spin	Titans

== Sri Lanka ==
Sri Lanka announced their World Cup squad on 18 April. Nuwan Pradeep was ruled out of Sri Lanka's last two matches of the tournament, after contracting chickenpox. He was replaced by Kasun Rajitha.

Coach: (Sri Lanka) Chandika Hathurusingha

S/N	Player	Date of birth (age)	ODIs	Role	Batting	Bowling style	List A or domestic team
16	Dimuth Karunaratne (c)	21 April 1988 (aged 31)	18	Batsman	Left	Right-arm medium	Sinhalese
75	Dhananjaya de Silva (vc)	6 September 1991 (aged 27)	33	All-rounder	Right	Right-arm off spin	Tamil Union
69	Angelo Mathews	2 June 1987 (aged 31)	204	All-rounder	Right	Right-arm fast-medium	Colts
28	Avishka Fernando	5 April 1998 (aged 21)	6	Batsman	Right	Right-arm medium	Colts
66	Lahiru Thirimanne	9 August 1989 (aged 29)	118	Batsman	Left	Right-arm medium	Ragama
2	Kusal Mendis	2 February 1995 (aged 24)	63	Wicket-keeper	Right	Right-arm leg spin	Colombo
55	Kusal Perera (wk)	17 August 1990 (aged 28)	88	Wicket-keeper	Left	Right-arm medium	Colts
1	Thisara Perera	3 April 1989 (aged 30)	154	All-rounder	Left	Right arm medium	Sinhalese
17	Isuru Udana	17 February 1988 (aged 31)	6	All-rounder	Right	Left-arm fast-medium	Chilaw Marians
46	Jeffrey Vandersay	5 February 1990 (aged 29)	11	Bowler	Right	Right-arm leg spin	Sinhalese
86	Jeevan Mendis	15 January 1983 (aged 36)	55	All-rounder	Left	Right-arm leg spin	Tamil Union
57	Milinda Siriwardana	4 December 1985 (aged 33)	26	All-rounder	Left	Left-arm orthodox	Chilaw Marians
99	Lasith Malinga	28 August 1983 (aged 35)	218	Bowler	Right	Right-arm fast	Nondescripts
82	Suranga Lakmal	10 March 1987 (aged 32)	82	Bowler	Right	Right-arm fast-medium	Tamil Union
63	Nuwan Pradeep	19 October 1986 (aged 32)	35	Bowler	Right	Right-arm fast-medium	Sinhalese

== West Indies ==
West Indies announced their World Cup squad on 24 April. On 19 May 2019, Sunil Ambris, Dwayne Bravo, John Campbell, Jonathan Carter, Roston Chase, Shane Dowrich, Keemo Paul, Khary Pierre, Raymon Reifer and Kieron Pollard were all named as reserve players by Cricket West Indies. On 24 June 2019, Andre Russell was ruled out of the rest of the tournament, due to a knee injury, and was replaced by Sunil Ambris.

Coach: (Cricket West Indies) Floyd Reifer

S/N	Player	Date of birth (age)	ODIs	Role	Batting	Bowling style	List A or domestic team
8	Jason Holder (c)	5 November 1991 (aged 27)	95	All-rounder	Right	Right-arm medium	Barbados
45	Chris Gayle (vc)	21 September 1979 (aged 39)	289	Batsman	Left	Right-arm off spin	Jamaica
97	Fabian Allen	7 May 1995 (aged 24)	7	All rounder	Right	Left-arm orthodox	Jamaica
26	Carlos Brathwaite	18 July 1988 (aged 30)	33	All-rounder	Right	Right-arm medium	Barbados
46	Darren Bravo	6 February 1989 (aged 30)	107	Batsman	Left	Right-arm medium	Trinidad and Tobago
19	Sheldon Cottrell	19 August 1989 (aged 29)	14	Bowler	Right	Left-arm fast-medium	Jamaica
85	Shannon Gabriel	28 April 1988 (aged 31)	22	Bowler	Right	Right-arm fast	Trinidad and Tobago
2	Shimron Hetmyer	26 December 1996 (aged 22)	25	Batsman	Left	Right-arm leg spin	Guyana
4	Shai Hope (wk)	10 November 1993 (aged 25)	54	Wicket-keeper	Right	Left-arm medium	Barbados
17	Evin Lewis	27 December 1991 (aged 27)	35	Batsman	Left	Right-arm medium	Trinidad and Tobago
5	Ashley Nurse	22 December 1988 (aged 30)	50	Bowler	Right	Right-arm off spin	Barbados
29	Nicholas Pooran (wk)	2 October 1995 (aged 23)	1	Wicket-keeper	Left	—	Trinidad and Tobago
24	Kemar Roach	30 June 1988 (aged 30)	85	Bowler	Right	Right-arm fast-medium	Barbados
12	Andre Russell	29 April 1988 (aged 31)	52	All-rounder	Right	Right-arm fast	Jamaica
42	Oshane Thomas	18 February 1997 (aged 22)	9	Bowler	Left	Right-arm fast	Jamaica

== Statistics ==
=== ODI caps ===
This chart shows the total number of One Day International (ODI) caps for each team competing in the 2019 ICC Cricket World Cup. The caps only include those who were in the original 15 member squad submitted to the International Cricket Council (ICC) on 23 April 2019. The caps include all appearances in ODIs until 30 May 2019, the first day of the world cup.

Fewest caps (Note: The table only includes those who were in the 15 member squad at the start of the tournament. Caps include all appearances in ODIs before 30 May 2019, the first day of the World Cup.)		Most caps	
(New Zealand) Tom Blundell	0	(India) MS Dhoni	341 (Note: Includes three appearances for the Asia XI.)
(Cricket West Indies) Nicholas Pooran	1	(Cricket West Indies) Chris Gayle	289 (Note: Includes three appearances for the World XI.)
(Bangladesh) Abu Jayed	2	(Pakistan) Shoaib Malik	284
(England) Jofra Archer	3	(India) Virat Kohli	227
(England) Liam Dawson	3	(England) Eoin Morgan	222 (Note: Includes twenty-three appearances for Ireland.)

=== Age ===
Youngest players (Note: The table only includes those who were in the 15 member squad at the start of the tournament. Age as of 30 May 2019, the first day of the World Cup.)		Oldest players	
(Afghanistan) Mujeeb Ur Rahman	18 years, 63 days	(South Africa) Imran Tahir	40 years, 64 days
(Pakistan) Shaheen Afridi	19 years, 54 days	(Cricket West Indies) Chris Gayle	39 years, 251 days
(Pakistan) Mohammad Hasnain	19 years, 55 days	(Pakistan) Mohammad Hafeez	38 years, 225 days
(Pakistan) Shadab Khan	20 years, 238 days	(India) MS Dhoni	37 years, 327 days
(Afghanistan) Rashid Khan	20 years, 252 days	(Pakistan) Shoaib Malik	37 years, 118 days
