= 2010–11 MTN40 =

- Dates: 29 October 2010 – 10 December 2010
- Administrator(s): Cricket South Africa
- Cricket format: List A
- Tournament format(s): Double round-robin and playoffs
- Champions: Knights
- Participants: 6
- Most runs: Faf du Plessis (Titans) 567
- Most wickets: Ryan McLaren (Knights) 19

The 2010–11 MTN40 was a domestic one-day cricket championship in South Africa. It was the 30th time the championship was contested. The first match was played on 29 October 2010 and the final was on 10 December 2010 at SuperSport Park in Centurion. The trophy was won by the Knights after they defeated the Titans in the final.

The format of the group stage was changed this year, with the six franchises divided into two groups of three. Teams in the same group would play each other twice each (once at home and once away), and each of the teams in the other group only once. The top two teams in each group would progress to the semi-finals, which would be played over two (home and away) legs. New innovations were introduced to the playing conditions this year, including each team naming 13 players instead of 11. Teams could use 11 of these players during each innings. All of these changes were scrapped after a single season.

== Group stage ==
=== Points table ===
==== Pool A ====
Pos	Team	Pld	W	L	T	NR	BP	Pts	NRR
1	Titans	7	6	1	0	0	2	26	0.846
2	Knights	7	3	4	0	0	1	13	0.113
3	Warriors	7	2	5	0	0	0	8	−0.763

Source: Cricinfo

==== Pool B ====
Pos	Team	Pld	W	L	T	NR	BP	Pts	NRR
1	Dolphins	7	4	3	0	0	2	18	0.603
2	Lions	7	4	3	0	0	1	17	−0.032
3	Cape Cobras	7	2	5	0	0	0	8	−0.663

Source: Cricinfo

== Knockout stage ==
=== Semi-finals ===
==== 1st Legs ====
26 November 2010
Scorecard

Lions; 299/8 (40 overs)	v	Titans; 300/7 (38.4 overs)
Jonathan Vandiar 130 (108); Faf du Plessis 3/55 (7 overs)		Roelof van der Merwe 93 (51); Ethan O'Reilly 3/43 (8 overs)

Titans won by 3 wickets
SuperSport Park, Centurion
Umpires: Murray Brown and Brian Jerling
Player of the match: Roelof van der Merwe (Titans)

- Lions won the toss and decided to bat

28 November 2010
Scorecard

Dolphins; 226/7 (40 overs)	v	Knights; 227/6 (38.2 overs)
Ravi Bopara 64 (75); Jandre Coetzee 2/33 (7 overs)		Reeza Hendricks 64 (83); Kyle Abbott 2/37 (7 overs)

Knights won by 4 wickets
Mangaung Oval, Bloemfontein
Umpires: Earl Hendrikse and Dennis Smith
Player of the match: Johan van der Wath (Knights)

- Dolphins won the toss and decided to bat

==== 2nd Legs ====
1 December 2010
Scorecard

Titans; 287/8 (40 overs)	v	Lions; 276 (39.2 overs)
Jacques Rudolph 79 (54); Paul Harris 3/48 (8 overs)		Jean Symes 72 (52); Roelof van der Merwe 5/41 (8 overs)

Titans won by 11 runs
Wanderers, Johannesburg
Umpires: Ian Howell and Brian Jerling

- Lions won the toss and decided to field

3 December 2010
Scorecard

Knights; 215/6 (35 overs)	v	Dolphins; 207/9 (35 overs)
Morne van Wyk 109 (103); Imran Tahir 4/24 (7 overs)		David Miller 63 (53); Jandre Coetzee 3/30 (7 overs)

Knights won by 8 runs
Kingsmead, Durban
Umpires: Johan Cloete and Karl Hurter

- Dolphins won the toss and decided to field

=== Final ===
10 December 2010
Scorecard

Titans; 227 (39 overs)	v	Knights; 152/2 (21.4 overs)
Faf du Plessis 111* (96); Ryan McLaren 3/23 (8 overs)		Morne van Wyk 85* (70); Roelof van der Merwe 1/21 (4.4 overs)

Knights won by 8 wickets (D/L method)
SuperSport Park, Centurion
Umpires: Johan Cloete and Brian Jerling
Player of the match: Morne van Wyk (Knights)

== Statistics ==
=== Most Runs ===
Player	Team	Runs	Matches	I	NO	Highest score	Avg	Balls faced	Strike rate	100s	50s	0s	Fours	Sixes
Faf du Plessis	(South Africa) Titans	567	10	10	3	120*	81.00	575	98.60	3	2	0	44	7
Rilee Rossouw	(South Africa) Knights	439	10	10	1	102*	48.77	442	99.32	2	1	0	41	8
Justin Kreusch	(South Africa) Warriors	404	7	7	1	118	67.33	400	101.00	1	3	1	25	7
Jacques Rudolph	(South Africa) Titans	383	10	10	0	85	38.30	376	101.86	0	3	0	47	4
Zander de Bruyn	(South Africa) Lions	345	9	9	4	109*	69.00	348	99.13	1	3	2	28	6

Source: Cricinfo

=== Most Wickets ===
Player	Team	Wickets	Matches	Overs	Maidens	Runs	Best Figures	Avg	Econ	SR	5W
Ryan McLaren	(South Africa) Knights	19	10	73.0	7	386	4/42	20.31	5.28	23.0	0
Jandre Coetzee	(South Africa) Knights	17	10	62.0	1	333	3/30	19.58	5.37	21.8	0
Roelof van der Merwe	(South Africa) Titans	16	10	69.4	1	364	5/41	22.75	5.22	26.1	1
Imran Tahir	(South Africa) Dolphins	15	9	59.4	2	264	4/24	17.60	4.42	23.8	0
Ravi Bopara	(England) Dolphins	15	9	48.4	0	313	5/63	20.86	6.43	19.4	1

Source: Cricinfo
