= Andrew Puttick =

South African former cricketer

Personal information
- Full name: Andrew George Puttick
- Born: 11 December 1980 (age 45); Cape Town, Cape Province, South Africa
- Nickname: Boom
- Batting: Left-handed
- Bowling: Right-arm off-spin

International information
- National side: South Africa
- Only ODI (cap 79): 28 October 2005 v New Zealand

Career statistics
Competition	ODI	FC	LA	T20
Matches	1	173	172	83
Runs scored	0	10,956	5,288	1,791
Batting average	0.00	40.27	36.21	25.58
100s/50s	0/0	27/46	12/30	1/9
Top score	0	250*	143	104*
Catches/stumpings	1/–	203/2	108/8	26/6
- Source: CricInfo, 25 March 2018

Andrew George Puttick (born 11 December 1980) is a South African cricket coach and former cricketer. He is the current batting coach of the Afghanistan national cricket team.

== International career ==
A left-handed opening batsman, Puttick represented South Africa at the 1996 Lombard Under-15 Challenge Cup in England and the 2000 Under-19 World Cup in Sri Lanka.

Puttick toured Sri Lanka with South Africa A in 2003 and returned there in 2004 but this time with the national squad. Replacing Herschelle Gibbs, he remained on the sidelines all tour and had to wait until the following year for his international debut. He eventually made his ODI debut for the Proteas against New Zealand in Cape Town on 28 October 2005.

== Domestic career ==
After making his first class debut in 2000–01, he immediately made an impact with a century in his third game, against Easterns at Newlands. He played for Western Province and Cape Cobras in domestic cricket and had a highest score of 250 not out.

On 10 October 2009, Puttick scored 104 not out for Cape Cobras against the Otago Volts in the 2009 Champions League Twenty20 and in doing so became the first ever batsman to score a century in Champions League T20 history. In the same month, he made 122 against the Highveld Lions in the inaugural match of the MTN 40.

Puttick achieved the rare feat of scoring a century in his final first class innings in March 2018.

== Coaching career ==
In August 2019, Puttick was named South Africa A Men's Team Assistant Coach.

Puttick was batting coach for the South African Women's National Team during the 2023 ICC Women's T20 World Cup where the team finished runners up.

In May 2023, he was appointed as the batting coach of the Pakistan national cricket team.

Puttick took up the position as batting coach of the Afghanistan national cricket team in January 2024 working alongside head coach, Jonathan Trott.
