= 2023–24 CSA Women's One-Day Cup =

South African women's domestic cricket season

- Dates: 30 September 2023 – 13 April 2024
- Administrator: Cricket South Africa
- Cricket format: 50 over
- Tournament format: Round robin
- Participants: 16
- Matches: 50

The 2023–24 CSA Women's One-Day Cup is the ongoing 28th edition of South Africa's provincial one-day cricket tournament. The tournament is taking place from September 2023 to April 2024, with 16 teams competing in three divisions. Western Province are the defending champions.

The Top 6 Division of the tournament forms part of the CSA Professional Domestic Women's League alongside the Top 6 Division of the CSA Women's T20 Challenge. Newly introduced for the 2023–24 season, the six teams competing in the division each have eleven professional players, alongside a permanent coaching set-up.

== Background ==
Prior to the 2023–24 season, the women's 50-over cricket competition in South Africa was known as the CSA Women's Provincial Programme. In August 2023, as part of the legacy of South Africa hosting the 2023 ICC Women's T20 World Cup, Cricket South Africa announced the introduction of a new "professional domestic system" for women's cricket. Whilst maintaining much of the structure of the CSA Women's Provincial Programme, the teams in the Top 6 Division would now have eleven professional players (up from six), alongside full-time coaching staff. The 50-over tournament was renamed the CSA Women's One-Day Cup (aligning with the men's tournament) as part of the changes.

== Competition format ==
The 16 teams are divided into three divisions: a professionalised top division named "Top 6", and two lower divisions, Pools A and B. Teams in Pools A and B play each other team in their group once in a round-robin format, whilst teams in the Top 6 league play each other team in their group twice. Matches are played using a one day format, with 50 overs per side.

The winner of the Top 6 league will be crowned the Champions. The winners of Pools A and B will play off for promotion. The tournament runs concurrently with the 2023–24 CSA Women's T20 Challenge, with matches played either the day before or day after the corresponding encounter between two teams in the T20 tournament.

The groups work on a points system with positions being based on the total points. Points are awarded as follows:

Win: 4 points.
Tie: 3 points.
Loss: 0 points.
Abandoned/No Result: 2 points.
Bonus Point: 1 bonus point available per match.

== Teams ==
Top 6	Central Gauteng	Free State	Northerns	KwaZulu-Natal Coastal	South Western Districts	Western Province
Pool A	Boland	Border	Eastern Province	Kei	Northern Cape	
Pool B	Easterns	KwaZulu-Natal Inland	Limpopo	Mpumalanga	North West	

== Tables ==
As of 26 October 2023

=== Top 6 ===
Team	Pld	W	L	T	NR	A	BP	Pts	NRR
Central Gauteng	2	2	0	0	0	0	0	8	+0.480
KwaZulu-Natal Coastal	2	1	0	0	0	1	1	7	+2.372
Northerns	3	1	2	0	0	0	1	5	+0.374
South Western Districts	2	1	1	0	0	0	1	5	–0.881
Free State	2	1	1	0	0	0	0	4	+0.014
Western Province	3	0	2	0	0	1	0	2	–1.482

=== Pool A ===
Team	Pld	W	L	T	NR	A	BP	Pts	NRR
Boland	1	1	0	0	0	0	1	5	+2.510
Eastern Province	1	0	0	0	0	1	0	2	+0.000
Northern Cape	1	0	0	0	0	1	0	2	+0.000
Kei	0	0	0	0	0	0	0	0	+0.000
Border	1	0	1	0	0	0	0	0	–2.510

=== Pool B ===
Team	Pld	W	L	T	NR	A	BP	Pts	NRR
North West	1	1	0	0	0	0	0	5	+1.535
KwaZulu-Natal Inland	1	1	0	0	0	0	0	5	+1.492
Limpopo	0	0	0	0	0	0	0	0	+0.000
Mpumalanga	1	0	1	0	0	0	0	0	–1.492
Easterns	1	0	1	0	0	0	0	0	–1.535
