= 2023–24 CSA Women's T20 Challenge =

South African women's domestic cricket season

- Dates: 1 October 2023 – 14 April 2024
- Administrator: Cricket South Africa
- Cricket format: Twenty20
- Tournament format: Round robin
- Participants: 16
- Matches: 50

The 2023–24 CSA Women's T20 Challenge is the ongoing 11th edition of South Africa's provincial Twenty20 cricket tournament. The tournament is taking place from October 2023 to April 2024, with 16 teams competing in three divisions. Central Gauteng are the defending champions.

The Top 6 Division of the tournament forms part of the CSA Professional Domestic Women's League alongside the Top 6 Division of the CSA Women's One-Day Cup. Newly introduced for the 2023–24 season, the six teams competing in the division each have eleven professional players, alongside a permanent coaching set-up.

== Background ==
Prior to the 2023–24 season, the women's Twenty20 cricket competition in South Africa was known as the CSA Women's Provincial T20 Competition. In August 2023, as part of the legacy of South Africa hosting the 2023 ICC Women's T20 World Cup, Cricket South Africa announced the introduction of a new "professional domestic system" for women's cricket. Whilst maintaining much of the structure of the CSA Women's Provincial T20 Competition, the teams in the Top 6 Division would now have eleven professional players (up from six), alongside full-time coaching staff. The T20 tournament was renamed the CSA Women's T20 Challenge (aligning with the men's tournament) as part of the changes.

== Competition format ==
The 16 teams are divided into three divisions: a professionalised top division named "Top 6", and two lower divisions, Pools A and B. Teams in Pools A and B play each other team in their group once in a round-robin format, whilst teams in the Top 6 league play each other team in their group twice. Matches are played using a Twenty20 format. The winner of the Top 6 league will be crowned the Champions.

The tournament runs concurrently with the 2023–24 CSA Women's One-Day Cup, with matches played either the day before or day after the corresponding encounter between two teams in the T20 tournament. To maintain this link for the following season, promotion and relegation in the Women's T20 Challenge is determined by standings in the Provincial League.

The groups work on a points system with positions being based on the total points. Points are awarded as follows:

Win: 4 points.
Loss: 0 points.
Abandoned/No Result: 2 points.
Bonus Point: 1 bonus point available per match.

Tied matches are determined via a Super Over.

== Teams ==
Top 6	Central Gauteng	Free State	Northerns	KwaZulu-Natal Coastal	South Western Districts	Western Province
Pool A	Boland	Border	Eastern Province	Kei	Northern Cape	
Pool B	Easterns	KwaZulu-Natal Inland	Limpopo	Mpumalanga	North West	

== Tables ==
As of 26 October 2023

=== Top 6 ===
Team	Pld	W	L	T	NR	A	BP	Pts	NRR
Western Province	3	2	0	0	0	1	0	10	+0.570
South Western Districts	2	2	0	0	0	0	1	9	+1.600
Central Gauteng	1	1	0	0	0	0	0	4	+0.496
KwaZulu-Natal Coastal	2	0	1	0	0	1	0	2	–0.900
Free State	2	0	2	0	0	0	0	0	–0.359
Northerns	2	0	2	0	0	0	0	0	–1.600

=== Pool A ===
Team	Pld	W	L	T	NR	A	BP	Pts	NRR
Boland	1	1	0	0	0	0	0	4	+0.274
Border	1	0	1	0	0	0	0	0	–0.274
Eastern Province	1	0	0	0	0	1	0	2	+0.000
Northern Cape	1	0	0	0	0	1	0	2	+0.000
Kei	0	0	0	0	0	0	0	0	+0.000

=== Pool B ===
Team	Pld	W	L	T	NR	A	BP	Pts	NRR
Easterns	1	1	0	0	0	0	0	4	+0.200
KwaZulu-Natal Inland	0	0	0	0	0	0	0	0	+0.000
Limpopo	0	0	0	0	0	0	0	0	+0.000
Mpumalanga	0	0	0	0	0	0	0	0	+0.000
North West	1	0	1	0	0	0	0	0	–0.200
