= CSA One-Day Cup =

One-day cricket competition in South Africa

- Countries: South Africa
- Administrator: Cricket South Africa
- Format: List A cricket
- First edition: 1981–82
- Latest edition: 2025–26
- Next edition: 2026–27
- Tournament format: Double round-robin and playoffs
- Number of teams: 15
- Current champion: Titans (6th title) (Division 1)
- Most successful: Western Province; Titans (6 titles each)

The CSA One-Day Cup (formerly known as the Standard Bank Cup, the MTN Domestic Championship, and the Momentum One-Day Cup) is the premier domestic one-day cricket competition of South Africa, its matches having List A status. The tournament was discontinued from the 2026–27 season and replaced by the Pro50 Cup and Division 2 teams compete in the Pro50 Shield. The competition forms part of Cricket South Africa's revamped domestic cricket structure for the 2026–27 season.

Matches are usually played partly under lights as day-night matches and occasionally get larger crowds than the Test matches.

== History ==
The tournament has been played since the 1982–83 season when five teams competed in the Benson and Hedges Series. The tournament gradually expanded, with eleven teams taking part from 1994–95 onwards, as more and more teams were promoted from the B groups of South African cricket. Two seasons later, it was renamed the Standard Bank League, and then the Standard Bank Cup, but the same teams competed, until Namibia were admitted in 2002–03.

To reflect the wider structural changes that were happening across South African cricket, from the 2004-05 season the competition was re-organised to mirror both the Four-Day and T20 leagues. The six newly created, entirely professional, franchises would take part in the tournament, with the former provincial teams continuing in a separate semi-professional CSA structure. In the 2007–08 season, Zimbabwe took part in the competition as a seventh side, playing both home and away fixtures.

Domestic cricketing reforms were introduced in 2020 that discontinued the six franchise team format and began a return to the more traditional provincial based system. Fifteen teams, split over the two divisions, now compete in the One-Day tournament.

In Division 1, five of the six teams who competed in the 2020–21 CSA Four-Day Franchise Series opted to retain their franchise brand, with only the former Cape Cobras reverting to their traditional Western Province name. They were joined in Division 1 by Boland and North West. Matches featuring either Limpopo or Mpumalanga, both in Division 2, do not have List A status.

On 30 March 2022, in the Division One match between Titans and North West, Titans scored 453/3 from their 50 overs, setting a record for the highest total in a List A match in South Africa. in 2024-25 Season is 45 edition.

== Winners ==
- 1981–82 Transvaal
- 1982–83 Transvaal
- 1983–84 Natal
- 1984–85 Transvaal
- 1985–86 Western Province
- 1986–87 Western Province
- 1987–88 Western Province
- 1988–89 Orange Free State
- 1989–90 Eastern Province
- 1990–91 Western Province
- 1991–92 Eastern Province
- 1992–93 Transvaal
- 1993–94 Orange Free State
- 1994–95 Orange Free State
- 1995–96 Orange Free State
- 1996–97 Natal
- 1997–98 Gauteng
- 1998–99 Griqualand West
- 1999-00 Boland
- 2000–01 KwaZulu Natal
- 2001–02 KwaZulu Natal
- 2002–03 Western Province
- 2003–04 Gauteng
- 2004–05 Eagles
- 2005–06 Eagles
- 2006–07 Cape Cobras
- 2007–08 Titans
- 2008–09 Titans
- 2009–10 Warriors
- 2010–11 Knights
- 2011–12 Cape Cobras
- 2012–13 Cape Cobras and Lions (shared)
- 2013–14 Cape Cobras and Titans (shared)
- 2014–15 Titans
- 2015–16 Lions
- 2016–17 Titans
- 2017–18 Dolphins and Warriors (shared)
- 2018–19 Titans
- 2019–20 Dolphins
- 2020–21 Dolphins and Lions (shared)
- 2021–22 Lions (Division 1), KwaZulu-Natal Inland (Division 2)
- 2022–23 Lions (Division 1), South Western Districts (Division 2)
- 2023–24 Western Province (Division 1), South Africa Emerging Players (Division 2)
- 2024–25 Dolphins (Division 1)
- 2025–26 Titans (Division 1), Knights (Division 2)

== Current structure ==
The 15 teams that take part are:

Division One
Team	Location	Province
Dolphins	Kingsmead, Durban	KwaZulu-Natal
Knights	Mangaung Oval, Bloemfontein	Free State
Warriors	St George's Park, Port Elizabeth	Eastern Cape
Titans	Super Sport Park, Centurion	Gauteng
Lions	Wanderers Stadium, Johannesburg	Gauteng
North West Dragons	Senwes Park, Potchefstroom	North West
Boland	Boland Park, Paarl	Western Cape
Western Province	Newlands, Cape Town	Western Cape

Division Two
Team	Location	Province
South Western Districts	Recreation Ground, Oudtshoorn	Western Cape
KwaZulu-Natal (Inland)	City Oval, Pietermaritzburg	KwaZulu-Natal
Northern Cape	De Beers Diamond Oval, Kimberley	Northern Cape
Limpopo	Polokwane Cricket Club, Polokwane	Limpopo
Easterns	Willowmoore Park, Benoni	Gauteng
Mpumalanga	Landau Recreation Club, Witbank	Mpumalanga
Border	Buffalo Park, East London	Eastern Cape

Points system:

- Win: 4 points
- Tie, no result or abandoned: 2 points
- Loss: 0 points
- Bonus points: 1 point awarded if the winning team achieves a run rate of at least 1.25 times that of the opposition.

In the event of teams finishing on equal points, the top three places are determined in the following order of priority: (taken from Cricket South Africa Summer Handbook 2011–2012)

- The team with the most wins;
- If still equal, the team with the most wins over the other team(s) who are equal on points and have the same number of wins;
- If still equal, the team with the most bonus points;
- If still equal, the team with the highest net run rate.
