= St George's Park Cricket Ground =

Cricket ground

St George's Park
- St George's
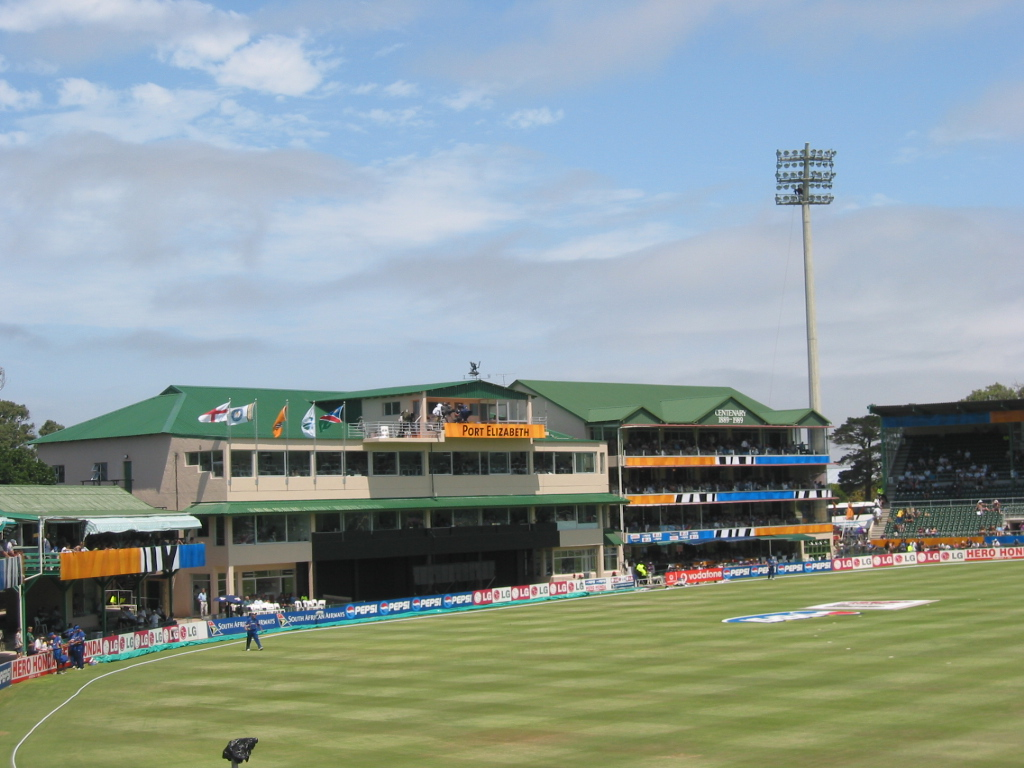
- Interactive map of St George's Park

Ground information
- Location: St George's Park, Gqeberha, South Africa
- Country: South Africa
- Coordinates: 33°57′59″S 25°36′37″E
- Capacity: 19,000
- Tenants: South Africa national cricket team and Sunrisers Eastern Cape
- End names
- Duckpond End; Park Drive End

International information
- First men's Test: 12–13 March 1889: South Africa v England
- Last men's Test: 18–22 October 2026: South Africa v Australia
- First men's ODI: 9 December 1992: South Africa v India
- Last men's ODI: 19 December 2023: South Africa v India
- First men's T20I: 16 December 2007: South Africa v West Indies
- Last men's T20I: 10 November 2024: South Africa v India
- Only women's Test: 2–5 December 1960: South Africa v England
- Only women's ODI: 16 December 2025: South Africa v Ireland
- First women's T20I: 14 February 2023: Australia v Bangladesh
- Last women's T20I: 20 February 2023: India v Ireland

Team information
Eastern Province	(1889–present)
Warriors	(2004–2021)
Nelson Mandela Bay Giants	(2018-2019)
Sunrisers Eastern Cape	(2023-present)
- As of 28 October 2026; Source: Cricinfo

St George's Park Cricket Ground (commonly known as St George's Park, Crusaders Ground or simply Crusaders) is a cricket ground in Gqeberha, (formerly known as Port Elizabeth), in South Africa. It is the home of the Port Elizabeth Cricket Club, one of the oldest cricket clubs in South Africa, the Eastern Province Club and Sunrisers Eastern Cape. It is also one of the venues at which Test matches and One Day Internationals are played in South Africa. It is older than Kingswood College in Grahamstown. The ground is notable for its brass band that plays during major matches, adding a unique flavour to its atmosphere.

The ground hosted its first Test match in March 1889 when England defeated South Africa by 8 wickets. This was South Africa's first Test match. As of 2005, there have been 21 Test matches played at the ground of which South Africa has won 8 and their opponents 9 with 4 draws.

The first One Day International played at the ground was in December 1992 when South Africa beat India by 6 wickets. It also hosted five games in the Cricket World Cup in 2003.

== Official name ==
The ground's official name is acknowledging a commercial sponsorship arrangement. However South African and other cricket fans continue to call the ground by its historic name, just "St George’s Park". Its nickname is "The Dragon's Lair" based on the famous legend of St George.

== 2003 Cricket World Cup ==
St George's Park was one of 15 venues in South Africa, Zimbabwe and Kenya selected to host matches during the world cup. It hosted 5 matches during the tournament, including 3 group games, 1 super six game and a semi-final.

== 2009 Indian Premier League ==
When the 2009 IPL was moved to South Africa, St George's Park was chosen as one of eight venues in South Africa to host matches. The ground hosted seven matches, all of them group games.

== Warriors Cricket ==
The stadium is one of the Warriors' 2 home grounds, the other being East London's Buffalo Park. The stadium hosts Warriors home matches in the Sunfoil Series, Momentum 1 Day Cup (previously the MTN Domestic Championship) and Ram Slam T20 Challenge.

== See also ==
- List of Test cricket grounds
