= Shaun George (cricketer) =

South African cricket umpire

Personal information
- Full name: Shaun George
- Born: 25 January 1968; Port Elizabeth, South Africa
- Died: 24 February 2024 (aged 56)
- Role: Bowler, Umpire

Domestic team information
- Years: Team
- 1987–1990: Eastern Province
- 1990–1991: Transvaal
- First-class debut: 14 March 1987 Eastern Province v Natal
- Last First-class: 26 January 1991 Transvaal v Western Province

Umpiring information
- ODIs umpired: 60 (2011–2022)
- T20Is umpired: 50 (2010–2023)
- WODIs umpired: 23 (2005–2018)
- WT20Is umpired: 17 (2018–2021)

Career statistics
Competition	First-class
Matches	17
Runs scored	230
Batting average	10.95
100s/50s	0/0
Top score	45*
Balls bowled	1930
Wickets	29
Bowling average	26.62
5 wickets in innings	0
10 wickets in match	0
Best bowling	3/66
Catches/stumpings	5/0
- Source: ESPNcricinfo, 28 March 2023

Shaun George (25 January 1968 – 24 February 2024) was a South African former cricketer who later became an international umpire. He was part of Cricket South Africa's umpire panel for first-class matches.

== Playing career ==
George played first-class cricket for Eastern Province and Transvaal between 1987 and 1991.

== Umpiring career ==
After making his first-class and List A umpiring debut in 2004, George officiated in his first Twenty20 international (T20I) in 2010. He made his One-day international (ODI) debut the following year.

He was one of the seventeen on-field umpires for the 2018 Under-19 Cricket World Cup. He was one of the on-field umpires for the tournament final. In May 2018, he was promoted to the ICC Test/ODI Emerging Panel of umpires.

In October 2018, he was named as one of the twelve on-field umpires for the 2018 ICC Women's World Twenty20. Along with Langton Rusere, he was appointed one of the on-field umpires for the tournament's final.

In July 2019, George umpired in his 50th ODI, in the third ODI between Ireland and Zimbabwe, at Stormont, Belfast. In February 2020, the ICC named him one of the umpires to officiate in matches during the 2020 ICC Women's T20 World Cup in Australia.

== Death ==
George died at the age of 56 from a stroke.

== See also ==
- List of One Day International cricket umpires
- List of Twenty20 International cricket umpires
