= Knights cricket team =

Cricket team

Knights
Team information
- Colours: Blue Yellow
- Founded: 2003; 23 years ago
- Home ground: Mangaung Oval
- Capacity: 20,000
First-class
T20

The Knights cricket team is the name used by Free State Cricket Union to brand its top-level teams in South African cricket. Between the 2003–04 and 2009–10 seasons they operated as the Eagles cricket team.

The brand was established in 2004 as a men's franchise operated initially by Free State before being joined by Griqualand West after the end of the 2004–05 season, During the period of franchise cricket, which lasted until the end of the 2020–21 season, the Knights franchise competed in the CSA 4-Day Domestic Series, CSA One-Day Cup, and CSA T20 Challenge competitions.

Following the end of the franchise period, top-level competition in South Africa reverted to competitions involving provincial teams. Many of the senior provincial unions which had been involved in franchise competitions retained the names of their franchises as marketing tools. Free State, the senior team in the Knights franchise, chose to do so and compete using the name Titans.

As of July 2025 the team competes in Division 2 of the South African provincial structure. Their main home venue is the Mangaung Oval in Bloemfontein.

== History ==
Orange Free State, as the province was then called, competed in the Currie Cup from 1897–98. They won their first title in 1992–93, repeating the success the following season. in 1995 the team was renamed Free State, reflecting the political changes that took place in South Africa and the renaming of Orange Free State province as Free State. The team won the Currie Cup again in 1997–98.

=== Franchise era ===
During 2003, Cricket South Africa changed the way in which top-class domestic cricket in the country was organised. This created six franchise teams at the top level of domestic competition, combining the existing provincial teams to create an elite competition. During negotiations, five of the six franchises were created without significant problems, (Note: Eastern Province and Border, the teams which formed the Warriors franchise, needed mediation from Cricket South Africa to finalise the arrangements to create the franchise.) leaving two Cricket Unions, Free State and Griqualand West. (Note: The two teams are around 150 kilometres (93 mi) from each other, with Free State based at Bloemfontein in Free State province, and Griqualand West at Kimberley in what was then Cape Province. They were the only two teams from different provinces to merge. Kimberley is almost 1,000 kilometres (620 mi) from Cape Town where Cape Cobras were formed by Western Province and Boland.) The two were unable to agree on terms, and Cricket South Africa awarded the franchise to Free State, with the suggestion that Griqualand West take up a 45% share. Griqualand West refused initially to join the franchise, leaving Free State as the sole provincial union for the first full season of franchise cricket in 2004–05. The team joined the franchise during the 2005 winter.

The franchise, known initially as Eagles, competed in the 2003–04 CSA T20 Challenge, before the CSA 4-Day Domestic Series and CSA One-Day Cup also became franchise-only competitions the following season. The team shared the Currie Cup in 2004–05 with Dolphins before winning the competition outright in 2007–08. The franchise also won the One-Day Cup in 2004–05, 2005–06, and 2010–11 and the CSA T20 Challenge in 2003–04 and 2005–06.

The franchise name was changed for the 2010–11 season across all three formats, with the Eagles becoming the Knights.

=== Return to provincial cricket ===
During the period of franchise competitions, Free State and Griqualand West continued to compete as separate cricket unions in the CSA 3-Day and One-Day Cups and CSA T20 competitions. The period of franchise competition lasted until the end of the 2020–21 season when Cricket South Africa reverted to a division based provincial competition, with both teams competing separately from the start of the 2021–22 season. Many of the senior provincial unions which had been involved in franchise competitions retained the names of their franchises as marketing tools. Free State, the senior team in the Knights franchise, chose to do so and compete using the name Knights.

== Honours ==
=== Franchise period ===
- CSA 4-Day Domestic Series (1) – 2007–08; shared (1) – 2004–05
- CSA One-Day Cup (3) – 2004–05, 2005–06, 2010–11
- CSA T20 Challenge (2) – 2003–04, 2005–06

=== Post-franchise ===
- CSA 4-Day Domestic Series Division 2, Runners-up (1) – 2023–24
- CSA One-Day Cup Division 2, Runners-up (1) – 2023–24
- CSA Provincial T20 Cup (1) – 2021–22
