= Dolphins (South African cricket team) =

Cricket team

Hollywoodbets Dolphins

Personnel
- Captain: Keshav Maharaj
- Coach: Quinton Friend

Team information
- Colours: Black Green
- Founded: 2003; 23 years ago
- Home ground: Kingsmead Cricket Ground, Durban
- Capacity: 17,000
- Official website: https://www.dolphinscricket.co.za
First-class
ODI/T20 Away
ODI/T20 Home

The Dolphins (known as the Hollywoodbets Dolphins for sponsorship reasons) are a cricket team representing the KwaZulu-Natal (Coastal) province in South Africa. They take part in the CSA 4-Day Series first-class competition, the CSA One-Day Cup and the CSA T20 Challenge. The team's home venue is Hollywoodbets Kingsmead Cricket Ground, Durban.

== History ==
The Dolphins were originally created as an entirely professional franchise team after the South African domestic format was restructured in 2004-05. Up until then eleven provincial teams, with various small changes, had competed in the Currie Cup since 1893-94.

Natal (as the province was then called) was one of the most successful teams in the 20th century provincial era with twenty title wins. In 1998-99, Natal became KwaZulu-Natal to reflect the political changes that were taking place in the country. The team won one more final title in 2001-02.

In 2004-05, the eleven provincial teams were rationalised into six new, entirely professional franchises, in all three formats. The Dolphins were the only squad that did not merge several other provincial teams to form the new side. In the Franchise-era, the Dolphins won only one outright title, with two others being shared wins.

In 2020, domestic cricket in South Africa was restructured and the six former franchise teams were dropped. In its place was a return to the more traditional two-division league format, with a total of fifteen professional teams competing due to the previously semi-professional provincial cricket being subsumed (effectively becoming Division 2).

The former name of KwaZulu-Natal (Coastal) could have returned during this time (KwaZulu-Natal (Inland) was granted first class provincial status in 2009), however the KwaZulu-Natal Cricket Union decided to maintain the brand recognition from the franchise era, with the new team continuing to be called the Dolphins.

== Playing kit ==
The Dolphins home kit consists of black shirts and black trousers with green trim during limited overs competitions. The away strip for limited overs competitions is purple shirts and purple trousers with yellow trim.

== Sponsors ==
Hollywoodbets have been the Dolphins' primary shirt sponsors since September 2017, with local radio station East Coast Radio (ECR 94.5FM) and Fourways Airconditioning their associate sponsors.

== Honours ==
- CSA 4-Day Series (2) – 2020-21, 2022-23 ; shared (2) – 2004-05, 2005-06
- Momentum/CSA One Day Cup Winners (2) - 2019-20, 2024-25 ; shared (2) 2017/18 (shared with Warriors), 2020/21 (shared with Lions)
- Ram Slam T20 Challenge Winners 2013/14

The Dolphins finished as runners-up in the 2017/18 Ram Slam T20 Challenge, after losing to the Multiply Titans in the final at Centurion.

The Dolphins reached the final of the 2017/18 Momentum One Day Cup after beating the Cape Cobras in the semi-final. The Dolphins played the Warriors in the final at Kingsmead, however the match was abandoned halfway through the Dolphins first innings due to persistent rain. The rain continued on the reserve day forcing the final to be abandoned, and the trophy was shared between the two teams.

== Squad ==
- Bold denotes players with international caps.

Name	Birth date	Batting style	Bowling style	Notes
Batsmen
Marques Ackerman	1 March 1996 (age 30)	Left-handed	Right arm off break	First-class Captain
**Khaya Zondo**	7 March 1990 (age 36)	Right-handed	Right arm off break	
**Sarel Erwee**	10 November 1989 (age 37)	Left-handed	Right arm off break	
Thamsanqa Khumalo	23 September 1999 (age 27)	Left-handed	Right arm off break	
**David Miller**	10 June 1989 (age 37)	Left-handed	Right arm off break	
All-Rounders
Jason Smith	11 October 1994 (age 32)	Right-handed	Right-arm medium-fast	
Bryce Parsons	13 February 2001 (age 25)	Left-handed	Slow left-arm orthodox	
**Andile Phehlukwayo**	3 March 1996 (age 30)	Left-handed	Right arm fast	
**Ruan de Swardt**	21 January 1998 (age 28)	Left-handed	Right-arm medium-fast	
Wicket-keepers
**Keegan Petersen**	8 August 1993 (age 33)	Right-handed		
Grant Roelofsen	26 July 1996 (age 30)	Right-handed		
Spin Bowlers
Prenelan Subrayen	23 September 1993 (age 33)	Right-handed	Right arm off break	Twenty20 Captain
**Keshav Maharaj**	7 February 1990 (age 36)	Right-handed	Slow left-arm orthodox	List A Captain
Seam Bowlers
Eathan Bosch	27 April 1998 (age 28)	Right-handed	Right arm fast	
Ottniel Baartman	18 March 1993 (age 33)	Right-handed	Right arm medium-fast	
Kerwin Mungroo	31 July 1994 (age 32)	Right-handed	Right arm fast	
**Daryn Dupavillon**	15 July 1994 (age 32)	Right-handed	Right arm fast	

== Team management ==
Imraan Khan (Head Coach), Quinton Friend (Bowling Coach), Mduduzi Mbatha (Fielding Coach), Devon Van Onselen (Strength & Conditioning), Nicholas Moffitt (Physiotherapist), Anderson Ndovela (Manager).

== Former players ==
Former Dolphins cricketers include Proteas players Shaun Pollock, Jonty Rhodes, Pat Symcox, Lance Klusener, Andrew Hudson, Errol Stewart, Dale Benkenstein, Imraan Khan, Morné van Wyk, Dane Vilas and Mthokozisi Shezi. Hashim Amla played for the Dolphins for many seasons before moving to the Cape Cobras. Kyle Abbott played for the Dolphins before moving to Hampshire on a Kolpak deal.

International players to play for the Dolphins include Malcolm Marshall, Collis King, Hartley Alleyne, Nixon McLean, Eldine Baptiste, Neil Johnson, Sanath Jayasuriya, Ravi Bopara, Graham Onions and Kevin Pietersen.

Current Proteas cricketers in the Dolphins squad include Keshav Maharaj, David Miller, Imran Tahir, Andile Phehlukwayo, Robert Frylinck, Vaughn van Jaarsveld, Khaya Zondo, Senuran Muthusamy and Daryn Dupavillon.
