= Lions cricket team (South Africa) =

Cricket team

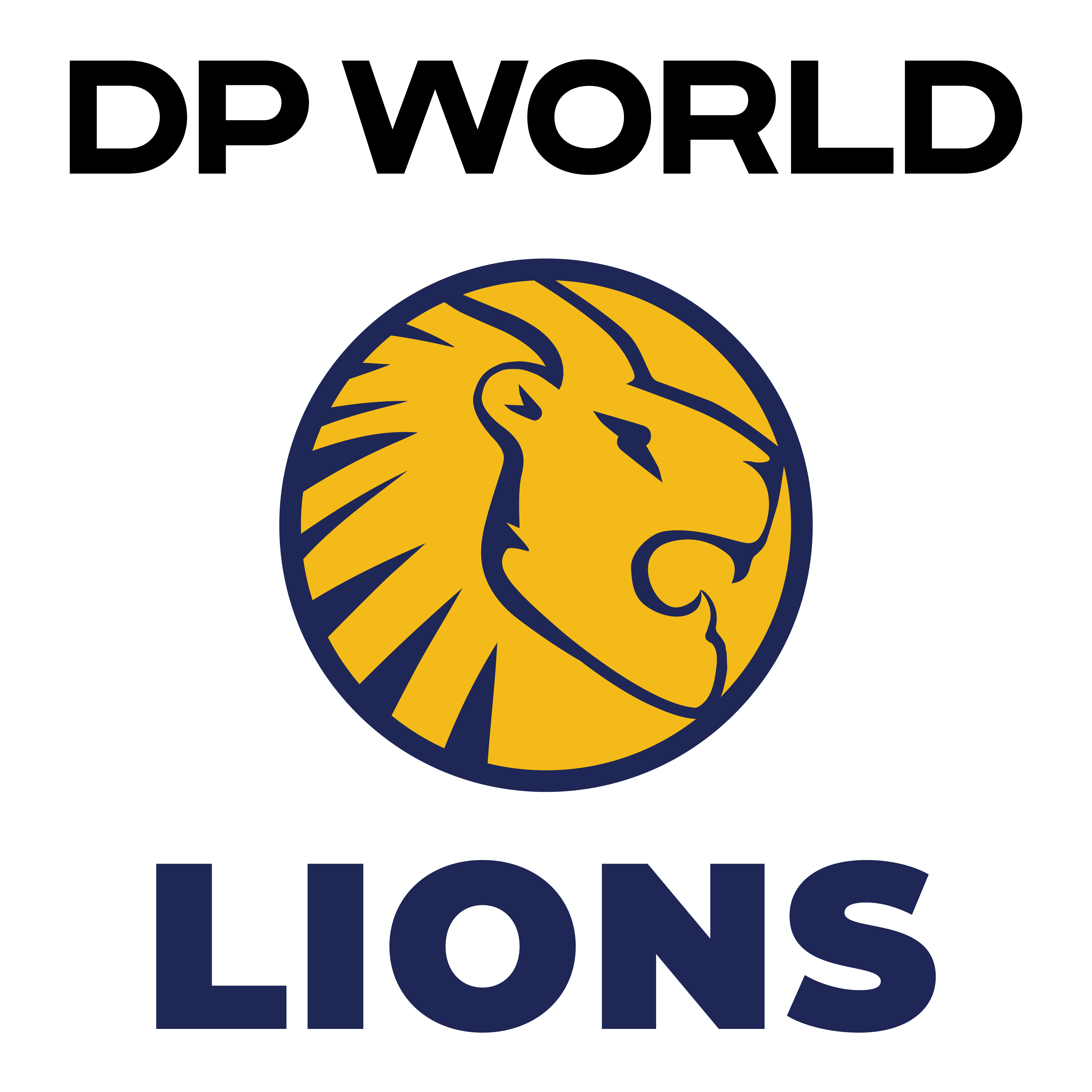

Personnel
- Coach: Russell Domingo

Team information
- Colours: Royal Blue; Gold
- Founded: 2003; 23 years ago
- Home ground: Wanderers Stadium (main venue)
- Capacity: 28,000 (DP World Wanderers)
- Official website: https://lionscricket.co.za/
First-class
T20

The Lions cricket team is a professional cricket team based at Johannesburg in South Africa. The home venue is the Wanderers Stadium.

The team plays in the CSA 4-Day Series first class cricket competition as well as in the CSA One-Day Cup, and CSA T20 Challenge limited over competitions.

== Description ==
The DP World Lions Cricket manages amateur cricket in Gauteng province.

All games happen in the following locations: Johannesburg North, Soweto, Kagiso, Central Johannesburg, Vaal South and surrounding areas.

The DP World Lions Cricket invests in six HUBS that are township-based, as well as one RPC.

Some of the organisations main focus areas are to grow blind, deaf and women's Cricket in the province and to reach rural areas.

There are 18 leagues throughout the province administered by the DP World Lions Cricket nd 50 clubs. Within these leagues, we see over 2000 cricket matches played during a season.

DP World Lions is owned by Lions Cricket.

Various Associations are affiliated to DP World Lions Cricket:

- South Gauteng Primary Schools Cricket Association
- Gauteng High Schools Cricket Association
- Gauteng Cricket Coaches Association
- Gauteng Deaf Cricket
- Gauteng Blind Cricket Association
- Gauteng Cricket Umpires Association and Gauteng Cricket Scorers Association.

The tertiary institutions are affiliated to the Union; Wits University, University of Johannesburg, Wits Technikon, Richfield Institute of Technology (a post-matric, distance online education learning institution) and the Vaal University of Technology.

Central Gauteng Lions now consist of three substructures: Johannesburg Metro, Sedibeng, and West Rand.

== Honours since the 2004/2005 season ==
- CSA 4 Day Domestic Series (3)

2014–15, 2018–19, 2019–20

- Momentum One Day Cup (3)

2012–13 (shared with Nashua Cape Cobras), 2015–16, 2020–21 (shared with the Hollywoodbets Dolphins)

2021–22 CSA One-Day Cup

- Betway T20 Challenge (4)

2006–07, 2012–13, 2018–19, 2020–21

- Champions League Twenty20

Runners-up: 2012

== Playing Kits ==
During the Momentum 1 Day Cup, and the limited-overs Twenty20 competition, the DP World Lions play in golden yellow shirts and trousers with slight royal blue accentuated patterns on the sleeves.

== Squad (Men) ==
- Bold denotes players with international caps.

| Name | Birth date | Batting style | Bowling style | Notes |
Batsmen
| **Temba Bavuma** | 17 May 1990 (age 36) | Right-handed | | |
| Dominic Hendricks | 7 November 1990 (age 35) | Left-handed | Right-arm off break | First-class & List A Captain |
| Connor Esterhuizen | 31 May 2001 (age 22) | Right-handed | | |
| **Zubayr Hamza** | 19 June 1995 (age 28) | Right-handed | | |
| **Reeza Hendricks** | 14 August 1989 (age 34) | Right-handed | | |
| Joshua Richards | 20 December 1998 (age 25) | Right-handed | | |
| **Ryan Rickelton** | 11 July 1996 (age 30) | Left-handed | | |
| Mitchell van Buuren | 21 January 1998 (age 26) | Right-handed | | |
| **Rassie van der Dussen** | 7 February 1989 (age 35) | Right-handed | Right-arm leg break | |
All-Rounders
| Bjorn Fortuin | 21 October 1994 (age 31) | Right-handed | Slow left-arm orthodox | |
| Evan Jones | 5 September 1996 (age 27) | Right-handed | Right-arm medium-fast | |
| **Wiaan Mulder** | 19 February 1998 (age 25) | Right-handed | Right-arm medium | |
| Delano Potgieter | 5 August 1996 (age 27) | Left-hand | Right-arm medium | |
| **Codi Yusuf** | 10 April 1998 (age 25) | Right-handed | Right-arm medium | |
Wicket-keepers
| **Ryan Rickelton** | 11 July 1996 (age 30) | Left-handed | | Twenty20 Captain |
Spin Bowlers
| **Bjorn Fortuin** | 21 October 1994 (age 31) | Right-handed | Slow left-arm orthodox | |
| Junaid Dawood | 2 October 1996 (age 27) | Right-handed | Right-arm leg break | |
| Tsepo Ndwandwa | 16 April 1995 (age 28) | Right-handed | Slow left-arm orthodox | |
Seam Bowlers
| Malusi Siboto | 20 August 1987 (age 38) | Right-handed | Right-arm medium-fast | |
| **Sisanda Magala** | 7 January 1991 (age 35) | Right-handed | Right-arm medium-fast | |
| **Tshepo Moreki** | 7 October 1993 (age 30) | Right-handed | Right-arm medium-fast | |
| **Duanne Olivier** | 9 May 1992 (age 34) | Right-handed | Right-arm medium-fast | |
| Codi Yusuf | 10 April 1998 (age 28) | Right-handed | Right-arm medium | |
| **Kagiso Rabada** | 25 May 1995 (age 31) | Left-handed | Right-arm fast | |

== Team management ==
Russell Domingo (Head Coach), Jimmy Kgamadi (Assistant Coach), Prasanna Agoram (Performance Analyst), Ziyaad Mahomed (Physiotherapist), Nandile Tyali (S & C), Dr Davina Naidoo (Doctor), Dr Nthabiseng Maesela (Doctor), Amit Bhoola (Team Manager).

== Squad (Women) ==
- Bold denotes players with international caps.

| Name | Birth date | Batting style | Bowling style | Notes |
Batsmen
| Bianca Booyjens | 15 December 1993 (age 31) | Right-handed | Right-arm medium | |
| Jenna Evans | 21 January 2006 (age 19) | Right-handed | | |
| Karabo Meso | 18 September 2007 (age 17) | Right-handed | | |
| Palesa Mapoo | 17 April 2000 (age 24) | Right-handed | | |
| Relebohile Mkhize | 26 September 2009 (age 15) | Right-handed | Right-arm medium | |
| Sarah Barber | 2 October 2003 (age 21) | Right-handed | Right-arm medium | |
| Sarah Nettleton | 3 April 2003 (age 21) | Right-handed | Right-arm medium-fast | |
| Sunette Viljoen-Louw | 6 October 1983 (age 41) | Right-handed | Right-arm medium-fast | |
All-Rounders
| Chloe Tryon | 25 January 1994 (age 31) | Right-handed | Slow Left arm Orthodox | |
| Diara Ramlakan | 27 March 2007 (age 17) | Right-handed | Right-arm medium-fast | |
| Madison Landsman | 30 January 2004 (age 21) | Right-handed | Right-arm leg break | |
| Nonkululeko Thabethe | 1 September 1992 (age 32) | Right-handed | Right-arm medium | |
| Robyn Kamerman | 12 August 2005 (age 19) | Right-handed | Right-arm orthodox | |
| Samantha Schutte | 26 May 1999 (age 25) | Right-handed | Right-arm medium | |
Wicket-keepers
| Karabo Meso | 18 September 2007 (age 17) | Right-handed | | |
| Palesa Mapoo | 17 April 2000 (age 24) | Right-handed | | |
| Sinalo Jafta | 22 December 1994 (age 29) | Right-handed | | |
Spin Bowlers
| Chloe Tryon | 25 January 1994 (age 30) | Right-handed | Slow left-arm orthodox | |
| Madison Landsman | 30 January 2004 (age 20) | Right-handed | Right-arm leg break | |
| Robyn Kamerman | 12 August 2005 (age 19) | Right-handed | Right-arm orthodox | |
| Raisibe Ntozakhe | 29 November 1996 (age 27) | Right-handed | Right-arm off break | |
Seam Bowlers
| Ayabonga Khaka | 18 July 1992 (age 31) | Right-handed | Right-arm medium | |
| Jameelah Shaikjee | 1 July 1989 (age 34) | Right-handed | Right-arm fast | |
| Kgomotso Rapoo | 16 May 2002 (age 21) | Right-handed | Right-arm medium | First Class, List A & Twenty20 Captain |
| Kirstie Thompson | 21 October 1988 (age 35) | Right-handed | Right-arm medium-fast | |
| Lehlohonolo Sardick | 12 June 2000 (age 20) | Right-handed | Right-arm medium | |
| Refilwe Moncho | 1 December 2004 (age 20) | Right-handed | Right-arm medium | |
| Shabnim Ismail | 5 October 1988 (age 35) | Right-handed | Right-arm medium-fast | |
| Sunette Viljoen- Louw | 6 October 1983 (age 40) | Right-handed | Right-arm medium | |
| Thristan Cronje | 5 May 2007 (age 16) | Right-handed | Right-arm medium | |
| Tumi Sekhukhune | 21 November 1998 (age 25) | Left-handed | Right-arm medium-fast | |

== Team management ==
Shaun Pretorius (Head Coach), Tholang Hlalele, Teboho Ntsukuyane (Assistant Coaches), Inge Konig (S & C), Sheenagh Jordan (Physiotherapist), AJ Rudman (Team Manager).

== Sources ==
- South African Cricket Annual – various editions
- Wisden Cricketers' Almanack – various editions
