= Titans cricket team =

Cricket team

Titans
- One Day name: Momentum Multiply Titans

Personnel
- Captain: Donovan Ferreira
- Coach: Rivash Gobind

Team information
- Colors: Light Blue Royal Blue
- Home ground: SuperSport Park
- Capacity: 18,000
- Official website: www.titans.co.za

The Titans cricket team is the name which the Northerns Cricket Union uses to brand its top-level teams in South African domestic cricket.

The brand was established in 2004 as a men's franchise operated by Northerns and Easterns, two of the three top-level teams in Gauteng province. During the period of franchise cricket, which lasted until the end of the 2020–21 season, the Titans franchise competed in the CSA 4-Day Domestic Series, CSA One-Day Cup, and CSA T20 Challenge competitions while both Northerns and Easterns competed separately in the CSA 3-Day and One-Day Cups and CSA T20 competitions. Following the end of the franchise period, top-level competition in South Africa reverted to competitions involving provincial teams. Many of the senior provincial unions which had been involved in franchise competitions retained the names of their franchises as marketing tools. Northerns, the senior team in the Titans franchise, chose to do so and compete using the name Titans.

Since the end of the franchise period, the team has played most of its matches at SuperSport Park in Centurion. As both a franchise organisation and under the sole control of Northerns, the side has won a number of domestic competitions.

== Honours ==
=== Franchise period ===
- CSA 4-Day Domestic Series (5) – 2006–07, 2008–09, 2011–12, 2015–16, 2017–18; shared (1) – 2005–06
- CSA One-Day Cup (6) – 2007–08, 2008–09, 2014–15, 2016–17, 2018–19; shared (1) – 2013–14
- CSA T20 Challenge (6) – 2004–05, 2007–08, 2011–12, 2015–16, 2016–17, 2017–18

=== Post-franchise ===
- CSA 4-Day Domestic Series (1) – 2022–23; shared (1) – 2024–25
- CSA One-Day Cup (1) – 2025–26
- CSA T20 Challenge (1) – 2022–23

== Players ==
=== Current squad ===
- **Bold** denotes players with international caps. The below list represents the Titans squad for the 2019/20 season and active uncontracted who have represented Titans in 2018/19 and 2019/20.

Name	Nat	Birth date	Batting style	Bowling style	Notes
Opening Batsmen
Andrea Agathangelou	(South Africa)	16 November 1989 (age 36)	Right-handed	Right arm leg break	
Tony de Zorzi	(South Africa)	28 August 1997 (age 29)	Left-handed	Right arm off break	
**Rilee Rossouw**	(South Africa)	30 June 1989 (age 37)	Left-handed	Slow left-arm orthodox	CSA contracted
Gionne Koopman	(South Africa)	28 December 1991 (age 34)	Left-handed	Right arm legbreak	
Victor Mahlangu	(South Africa)	5 October 1990 (age 35)	Right-handed	Right arm medium	
**Aiden Markram**	(South Africa)	4 October 1994 (age 31)	Right-handed	Right arm off break	CSA contracted
Wesley Marshall	(South Africa)	4 January 1994 (age 32)	Right-handed	Right arm medium	
Batsmen
**Farhaan Behardien**	(South Africa)	9 October 1983 (age 42)	Right-handed	Right arm medium	
**Henry Davids**	(South Africa)	19 January 1980 (age 46)	Right-handed	Right arm medium-fast	
**Theunis de Bruyn**	(South Africa)	8 October 1992 (age 33)	Right-handed	Right arm medium-fast	CSA contracted
**David Wiese**	(South Africa)	18 May 1985 (age 41)	Right-handed	Right arm leg break	CSA contracted
Diego Rosier	(South Africa)	2 May 1994 (age 32)	Right-handed	Right arm leg break	
Kabelo Sekhukhune	(South Africa)	16 July 1997 (age 29)	Left-handed	Right arm leg break	
Jonathan Vandiar	(South Africa)	25 April 1990 (age 36)	Left-handed	Right arm leg break	
Wicket-keepers
**Quinton de Kock**	(South Africa)	17 December 1992 (age 33)	Left-handed	—	CSA contracted
Rubin Hermann	(South Africa)	26 January 1997 (age 29)	Left-handed	—	
**Heinrich Klaasen**	(South Africa)	30 July 1991 (age 35)	Right-handed	—	Opener
Sizwe Masondo	(South Africa)	13 February 1987 (age 39)	Right-handed	—	
Rivaldo Moonsamy	(South Africa)	13 September 1996 (age 30)	Right-handed	—	
All-rounders
Matthew Arnold	(South Africa)	16 October 1988 (age 37)	Left-handed	Right arm fast-medium	
**Neil Brand**	(South Africa)	12 April 1996 (age 30)	Left-handed	Left-arm orthodox	
Dayyaan Galiem	(South Africa)	2 January 1997 (age 29)	Right-handed	Right arm medium-fast	
**Chris Morris**	(South Africa)	30 April 1987 (age 39)	Right-handed	Right arm fast-medium	
Grant Thomson	(South Africa)	18 March 1988 (age 38)	Right-handed	Right arm medium-fast	
Spin Bowlers
Gregory Mahlokwana	(South Africa)	14 December 1994 (age 31)	Left-handed	Left-arm orthodox spin	
**Tabraiz Shamsi**	(South Africa)	18 February 1990 (age 36)	Right-handed	Slow left-arm wrist-spin	CSA contracted
**Simon Harmer**	(South Africa)	31 December 1989 (age 36)	Right-handed	Right arm off break	
Seam Bowlers
Clayton August	(South Africa)	16 February 1990 (age 36)	Left-handed	Left Arm Fast-medium	
Corbin Bosch	(South Africa)	10 September 1994 (age 32)	Right-handed	Right arm fast-medium	
Tshepo Moreki	(South Africa)	7 October 1993 (age 32)	Right-handed	Right arm fast-medium	
Itumaleng Moseki	(South Africa)	21 August 1991 (age 35)	Right-handed	Right arm fast-medium	
Alfred Mothoa	(South Africa)	16 December 1989 (age 36)	Right-handed	Right arm fast-medium	
**Corbin Bosch**	(South Africa)	25 March 1994 (age 32)	Right-handed	Right arm fast	CSA contracted
Marcello Piedt	(South Africa)	23 September 1992 (age 34)	Right-handed	Right arm medium-fast	
**Dale Steyn**	(South Africa)	20 July 1983 (age 43)	Right- handed	Right arm Fast	CSA contracted; Limited-overs only
