= Warriors (cricket team) =

Cricket team

Personnel
- Captain: JJ Smuts
- One Day captain: JJ Smuts
- Coach: Robin Peterson

Team information
- Colours: Electric green Dark green Black
- Founded: 2003; 22 years ago
- Home ground: St George's Park, Port Elizabeth; Buffalo Park, East London
- Capacity: 19,000
- Official website: warriorscricket.co.za
First-class
T20

The Warriors are a Division 1 cricket team representing the Eastern Cape in South African domestic competitions. The Warriors take part in the CSA 4-Day Series first-class competition, the Momentum One-Day Cup and CSA T20 Challenge. The team's home venue is St George's Park in Port Elizabeth, as well as Buffalo Park in East London.

== History ==
The Warriors were originally established as an entirely professional franchise team following reforms that were carried out to the South African domestic leagues in 2004–05. Traditionally, from 1893–94 to 2004–05, eleven provincial teams (with occasional additions) had competed in the Currie Cup. In 2004–05, the eleven provincial teams were rationalised into six new, entirely professional franchises, in all three formats. Eastern Province CC and Border CC were the former clubs that merged to form the Warriors.

=== Eastern Province CC and Border CC ===
Eastern Province and Border both competed in the provincial Currie Cup from the 1890s until the creation of franchise teams in 2004. For both clubs, success was largely elusive throughout this period. Eastern Province's peak came in the mid to late 1980s with the team winning the series title in 1988–89, sharing the cup in 1989–90, and then a final outright win the following season in 1991–92. Four one-day titles, such as the Standard Bank Cup and the Nissan Cup, were also won during this time.

Border was one of the weakest cricketing teams in South Africa during the provincial domestic era. Border hold the record for the lowest aggregate score by a first class side in a match. During a Currie Cup match against Natal at Jan Smuts Ground in 1959–60, Border scored only 34 runs in the match - 16 in the first innings and 18 in the second innings. Border failed to win any first-class or List-A titles during the provincial era.

=== Franchise Era ===
Following the 2004-05 domestic reforms, the provincial teams of Eastern Province and Border were merged to form the Warriors franchise. The Warriors were the most unsuccessful franchise between 2004–05 and 2020–21 in the 4-Day domestic series, failing to win a single title. The 2009–10 season was the most successful for the team, winning both the one-day title and the T20 cup. One more one-day title followed in 2017–18, however this was shared with the Dolphins.

Like many of the other franchises, sponsorship rights were granted for the beginning of the team name. Until 2015, the official name of the team was the Chevrolet Warriors.

=== Return to Provincial Cricket ===
In 2020, domestic cricket in South Africa was restructured once more and the six former franchise teams were dropped. In its place was a return to the more traditional two-division league format, with a total of fifteen professional teams competing. The previously semi-professional provincial cricket league has been absorbed, effectively forming the leagues second division. Promotion and relegation between the two divisions, not seen since the start of the franchise era in 2004, will return after 2023–24.

The former name of Eastern Province or even Eastern Cape could have returned during this time, however Eastern Province Cricket decided to maintain the brand recognition from the franchise era, with the new team continuing to be called the Warriors.

During the month of October each year, the side eschews their traditional black and electric green colours in favour of a bold pink playing kit to show their support of Breast Cancer Awareness as well as their fundraising efforts for Reach for Recovery.

== Honours ==
- MTN Domestic One-Day Cup (1) 2009/2010
- Standard Bank Pro20 (1) - 2009/2010
- Momentum One Day Cup (1) Shared - 2017/2018
