= Cape Cobras =

Cricket teams of South Africa

Team information
- Founded: 2005; 21 years ago
- Home ground: Newlands
- Capacity: 22,500
- Official website: Cape Cobras
First-class
T20

The Cape Cobras were a franchise cricket team which represented the Western Cape region during the South African domestic franchise era between 2003–04 and 2020–21. The team was made up of played from the Western Province, Boland, and, from 2015 to 2016, South Western Districts cricket teams. The team's home games were played at Newlands Cricket Ground in Cape Town, Boland Park in Paarl and the Recreation Ground in Oudtshoorn.

The Cobras played in the 4-Day Franchise Series, One Day Cup and T20 Challenge competitions. They were one of the most successful domestic sides in the franchise era.

== Honours ==
- CSA 4-Day Franchise Series (3) - 2009–10, 2010–11, 2012–13
- CSA One Day Cup (1) - 2006–07
- CSA T20 Challenge (2) - 2008–09, 2010–11
