= CSA 4-Day Domestic Series =

Cricket tournament in South Africa

- Countries: South Africa
- Administrator: Cricket South Africa
- Format: First-class cricket
- First edition: 1889–90
- Latest edition: 2025–26
- Next edition: 2026–27
- Tournament format: Single round-robin
- Number of teams: 15
- Current champion: Lions
- Most successful: Transvaal/Gauteng/Lions
- Most runs: Graeme Pollock (12,409)
- Most wickets: Vintcent van der Bijl (572)
- 2026–27 CSA 4-Day Series

The CSA 4-Day Domestic Series is the domestic first class cricket competition of South Africa. The tournament is contested by teams from all nine provinces of South Africa.

First contested as the Currie Cup from 1889–90, the tournament has undergone many changes and modifications in its history. In 2004, the traditional province-based format was replaced, with many teams amalgamating. In its place, six entirely professional franchises were created that represented much larger population areas.

The competition underwent significant restructuring once again before the start of the 2021–22 season. The six-team franchise system was disbanded, and the tournament returned to its more traditional format. Fifteen province-based teams now compete across two divisions, determined by promotion and relegation.

The tournament was discontinued from the 2026–27 season and replaced by the 1st Class Series, while Division 2 teams compete in the 1st Class Shield. The competition forms part of Cricket South Africa's revamped domestic cricket structure for the 2026–27 season.

== History ==
=== Early years ===
As in many other Commonwealth nations, cricket was first introduced in South Africa by the British in the early 19th Century, and the sport became firmly established by the 1880s. In March 1889, a touring English side played a South African XI in two matches, in what would retrospectively be designated as the first Test matches played by South Africa.

First-class domestic cricket had slowly been developing since 1876, when local settlements and towns played each other in the Cape as part of the Champion Bat Tournament. The tournament was played on five occasions, with its final edition in 1890–91.

Sir Donald Currie, the founder of the Castle Shipping Line and the sponsor of the 1889 English tour, donated a trophy for the champions of the promising domestic competition. The Currie Cup was first awarded to Kimberley, who had beaten Transvaal in the single match competition of 1889–90. From 1892 to 1893, the competition began to take the familiar form of province-based competition in a champion format, inspired by the English county cricket structure. Kimberley (who became known as Griqualand West for the 1892–93 season) and Transvaal were joined by Western Province (1892–93), Natal, Eastern Province (both 1893–94), Border (1897–98) and Orange Free State (1903–04) — although not all of these teams competed in every season after they were established. Rhodesia and South Western Districts also competed on a once-off basis in the 1904–05 season.

The Currie Cup was not contested every year, and a total of fourteen seasons were contested between its inception and the First World War. Aside from an interruption during the Boer War, typically seasons were not held when the English team were touring. The competition took on several different formats, including a knock-out structure, and a round-robin followed by a challenge final against the previous year's winner; but in 1906–07, a round-robin league format was established, which would be unchanged until 1982–83.

=== Interwar years ===
First class cricket recommenced after the First World War in the 1920–21 season. The series continued to be held roughly two out of every three years, being cancelled during seasons which coincided with Test tours. After the 1925–26, all seven provincial teams featured in every season. They were joined temporarily by Rhodesia (who contested the consecutive 1929–30 and 1931–32 season), and permanently by North Eastern Transvaal in 1937–38, which was the final season before World War II. In all, eleven seasons were played between the wars. During this time, cricket in South Africa began to spread outside the British settler diaspora, particularly in the Afrikaner and Indian community. However, cricket remained strictly, although not yet legally, segregated with various national bodies governing cricket for the different racial groups. First-class domestic continued to be white-only.

=== Second World War and the beginning of isolation ===
After an eight-year hiatus, the Currie Cup restarted in 1946–47 with all eight provincial teams and Rhodesia (who would now feature permanently)

In 1951–52, the competition adopted a two-tiered structure, which was retained in some format until 1999–2000 (except for a one-off recombination into a single division in 1960–61). From its inception, until South Africa's international isolation in 1971, a promotion/relegation structure linked the two tiers, with the winner of the lower division generally replacing the last placed team from the top division — although this was not adhered to every season. The top division generally consisted of four or five teams.

During this time, the stronger provinces began to field a 'B' team in the lower division. Transvaal B was the first to appear (1959–60), followed by Natal B (1965–66). These B-teams were not promoted to the top division when they won the lower competition.

Since the 1965–66 season, the Currie Cup has been contested every year, and was no longer suspended during international tours.

The introduction of apartheid (separation of racial groups by strict legal enforcement) following the 1948 General Election did not have a great impact on the domestic competition. Although previously not bound legally, first-class cricket had long been de facto white-only and international opinion had little practical effect on the domestic game.

=== Apartheid isolation: the 1970s and 1980s ===
Domestic cricket in South Africa reached its peak during the years of isolation in the 1970s and 1980s. With standards exceptionally high, spectators came in their thousands to watch Currie Cup cricket due to the inability to support the national team following South Africa's expulsion in 1970 by the ICC.

The two-division format was retained, but promotion/relegation was abandoned, and from 1971 to 1972, the top division remained constant with five teams: Transvaal, Natal, Eastern Province, Western Province and Rhodesia. The second division expanded with more B-teams: Western Province B joining in 1975–76, and Eastern Province B and Rhodesia B joining in 1977–78.

During the 1970s, the second division became a separate competition from the Currie Cup, known initially as the Castle Bowl (and later under different commercial names, such as UCB Bowl). In 1971–72, North Eastern Transvaal became known as Northern Transvaal.

=== Political change and international restoration: the 1990s ===
Through the 1980s and 1990s, the weaker provincial teams began to gradually migrate back from the Bowl competition to the Currie Cup. At the same time, those provinces' B-teams began to contest the Bowl, which gradually turned the Bowl entirely into a Currie Cup second XI competition.

By 1996–97, the Bowl had split into a two-tier competition (with only the top division given first-class status), and by 1999–2000, all stand-alone provincial teams had returned to the Currie Cup, with the Bowl being shut down as a first-class competition.

Northern Transvaal was the first team to return to the Currie Cup, in 1979–80; that same year was the final year for Rhodesia, which did not participate following the end of white-minority rule and independence. Orange Free State returned to the Currie Cup in 1985–86. Border returned permanently in 1991–92 (following an unsuccessful two-season return in 1985–86 and 1986–87). Griqualand West returned in 1996–97. In addition, three new provincial teams entered during this time: Boland, who entered the Bowl in 1980–81, and entered the Cup in 1993–94; and Eastern Transvaal and Western Transvaal, who entered the Bowl in 1991–92, and were the last two teams promoted to the top level in 1999–2000.

During the same time, the Bowl competition was joined by Northern Transvaal B (1982–83), Orange Free State B (1989–90), Border B and Boland B (1993–94) and Griqualand West B (1997–98), as well as a Zimbabwean Board XI (1993–94) and Namibia cricket team (1996–97).

During the 1990s, as South Africa underwent political changes, several teams changed their names to adapt: Orange Free State became Free State (1995–96); Eastern Transvaal became Easterns (1995–96); Western Transvaal became North West (1996–97); Transvaal became Gauteng (1997–98); Northern Transvaal became Northerns (1997–98); and Natal became KwaZulu-Natal (1998–99). The competition itself also changed its name for commercial reasons, becoming the Castle Cup in 1990–91, and then the SuperSport Series in 1996–97.

During this era, the format of the competition changed several times. In 1982–83, a final was played between the top two teams; this was expanded to a four-team knock-out in 1983–84 and contracted to a three-team knock-out in 1985–86. In 1987–88, the league was split into two pools with a single final between the pool winners. In 1990–91, the league returned to a single pool with no final. The final returned in 1998–99. Then, with eleven teams from 1999 to 2000, the league adopted a format similar to the 1999 Cricket World Cup, with a super eight or super six round before a single final.

The most notable feature of this era was the end of the dominance of Transvaal, Natal and Western Province. Prior to the 1988–89 season, the three teams had amongst them won 59 of the 60 Currie Cups contested — the only exception being Kimberley's win in the second tournament in 1890–91, won based on the result of a single game against Transvaal. In 1988–89, Eastern Province finally broke that dominance when it beat Transvaal in the final. Orange Free State would win its first championship in the 1990s, and Easterns would also win a championship in the 2000s.

In first-class domestic cricket, Transvaal/Gauteng were the most successful team to have played, winning the competition 25 times between 1889–90 and 2004–05, as well as four shared titles.

=== Franchise era: 2004/05 – 2020/21 ===
In 2004–05, the format of South African domestic cricket was changed entirely. The eleven provincial teams were rationalised into six new teams: Western Province and Boland merged to form the Cape Cobras; Griqualand West and Free State formed the Eagles (who later became the Knights in 2010–11); Eastern Province and Border became the Warriors; North West and Gauteng became the Lions; Northerns and Easterns became the Titans; and KwaZulu-Natal became the Dolphins. These changes occurred across limited overs cricket as well as first class cricket, although the round-robin format was kept.

In the franchise era, the Titans (formerly North Eastern Transvaal/Northern Transvaal) were the most successful, winning six titles.

The eleven provincial Currie Cup teams, as well as South Western Districts and KwaZulu-Natal Inland, continued to compete separately in the Provincial Three-Day Challenge, which remained a first-class competition, although on a semi-professional level and no longer the top level of red-ball cricket in South Africa.

=== Return to provincial cricket: 2021– ===
In March 2021, Cricket South Africa announced that South African domestic cricket would undergo a major restructuring, with the six-team franchise system, as well as the semi-professional Provincial Competition, being dissolved. A new format of 15 first-class teams playing in two separate divisions, determined by promotion and relegation (after 2023/24), has been created in its place.

From 2019, provinces and cricket unions submitted bids to CSA to make a case to be considered for the top division for the initial two seasons. The bidding process was overseen by the Independent Evaluation Committee (IEE) who took into account a range of criteria, such as cricketing and financial operations, women's and age-group development, transformation policies and stadium infrastructure.

Eight teams make up the first division, with 16 contracted players each, and seven teams the second division, with 11 contracted players each, taking the total to 205.

CSA believes that the new format will provide more opportunities for players to compete at a high standard just below international cricket, in turn providing a wider talent pool for the national selectors. It is hoped that wider selection of teams at the highest domestic level will help increase playing opportunities of all races, particularly those currently underrepresented.

Although the new format being seen as a return to the more traditional structure, some of South Africa's nine provinces have more than one team. Only Free State, Limpopo, Mpumalanga, Northern Cape and North West – the least populated provinces – will have one team. Some new sides have opted to keep the name of their previous franchises to which they belonged, whilst others have decided on new branding.

== Teams ==
Division allocation as of the 2023–24 season.

Division One
Team	Location	Capacity	Province
Boland	Boland Park, Paarl	10,000	Western Cape
Dolphins	Kingsmead, Durban	25,000	KwaZulu-Natal
DP World Lions	Wanderers Stadium, Johannesburg	34,000	Gauteng
Knights	Mangaung Oval, Bloemfontein	20,000	Free State
North West Dragons	JB Marks Oval, Potchefstroom	18,000	North West
Titans	Centurion Park, Centurion, South Africa	22,000	Gauteng
Warriors	St George's Park, Gqeberha	19,000	Eastern Cape
Western Province	Newlands, Cape Town	25,000	Western Cape

Division Two
Team	Location	Capacity	Province
Border	Buffalo Park, East London	20,000	Eastern Cape
Easterns	Willowmoore Park, Benoni	20,000	Gauteng
KwaZulu-Natal Inland	City Oval, Pietermaritzburg	12,000	KwaZulu-Natal
Limpopo	Polokwane Cricket Club, Polokwane		Limpopo
Mpumalanga	Uplands College, White River		Mpumalanga
Northern Cape	De Beers Diamond Oval, Kimberley	11,000	Northern Cape
South Western Districts	Recreation Ground, Oudtshoorn		Western Cape

== Competition format ==
Points System

Teams are awarded points based on the result of the match as follows:

- Outright victory: 16 points
- Tie: 8 points
- Draw: 6 points
- Any other result: 0 points

In addition, teams earn bonus points based on their performance in the first 100 overs of each team's first innings:

- Batting bonus points: 1 point for reaching 150 runs, then 0.02 points for each run thereafter
- Bowling bonus points: 1 point for taking three wickets, then 1 point for each two wickets thereafter

A points system of this basic structure was first introduced in 1971–72, and has been used in almost all seasons since; the current points system was introduced in the 2017–18 season.

== Former teams ==
=== Franchise era: 2004/05 – 2020/21 ===
Franchise	Province
Cape Cobras	Western Cape
Dolphins	KwaZulu-Natal
Knights*	Free State & Northern Cape
Lions	Central Gauteng & North West
Titans	Northern and Eastern Gauteng
Warriors	Eastern Cape

- The Knights were known as the Eagles prior to the 2010–11 season.

=== Provincial era: 1889/90 – 2004/05 ===
Team	First season	Last season	Former names	B teams
Boland	1980–81	2003–04		
Border	1903–04	2003–04		
Eastern Province	1893–94	2003–04		Eastern Province B (1977–78 to 2004–05)
Easterns	1991–92	2003–04	Eastern Transvaal (1991–92 to 1994–95)	
Free State	1897–98	2003–04	Orange Free State (1897–98 to 1994–95)	
Gauteng	1889–90	2003–04	Transvaal (1889–90 to 1996–97)	Transvaal B (1959–60 to 1997–98)
Griqualand West	1889–90	2003–04	Kimberley (1889–90 to 1891–92)	
KwaZulu-Natal	1893–94	2003–04	Natal (1893–94 to 1997–98)	Natal B (1965–66 to 1998–99)
Northerns	1937–38	2003–04	Northern Transvaal (1971–72 to 1996–97); North Eastern Transvaal (1937–38 to 1970–71)	
North West	1991–92	2003–04	Western Transvaal (1991–92 to 1995–96)	
Rhodesia	1904–05 (Note: Rhodesia competed in 1904–05, 1929–30 and 1931–32 before playing each season from 1946–47.)	1979–80		Rhodesia B (1977–78 to 1979–80)
South Western Districts	1904–05	1904–05		
Western Province	1892–93	2003–04		Western Province B (1975–76 to 2004–05)

== Seasons ==
Season	Champions	Runners-up	Bowl winners	Bowl second	Notes
1889–90	Transvaal (1)	Kimberley (1)			Inaugural season Cup decided by single match
1890–91	Kimberley (1)	Transvaal (1)			
1891–92					Not contested
1892–93	Western Province (1)	Transvaal (2)			First appearance of Western Province; Kimberley now known as Griqualand West
1893–94	Western Province (2)	Natal (1)			First appearances of Natal and Eastern Province
1894–95	Transvaal (2)	Western Province (2)			
1895–96					Not contested
1896–97	Western Province (3)	Transvaal (3)			
1897–98	Western Province (4)	Transvaal (4)			First appearance of Orange Free State
Competition not contested from 1898–99 to 1901–02 due to Boer War
1902–03	Transvaal (3)	Western Province (2)			
1903–04	Transvaal (4)	Western Province (3)			First appearance of Border
1904–05	Transvaal (5)	Western Province (4)			One-off appearances of Rhodesia and South Western Districts
1905–06					Not contested
1906–07	Transvaal (6)	Natal (2)			
1907–08					Not contested
1908–09	Western Province (5)	Transvaal (2)			
1909–10					Not contested
1910–11	Natal (1)	Transvaal (6)			
1911–12					Not contested
1912–13	Natal (2)	Western Province (5)			
1913–14					Not contested
Competition not contested from 1914–15 to 1919–20 due to World War I
1920–21	Western Province (6)	Transvaal (7)			
1921–22	Western Province; Natal; Transvaal				
1922–23					Not contested
1923–24	Transvaal (7)	Natal (3)			
1924–25					Not contested
1925–26	Transvaal (8)	Griqualand West (2)			
1926–27	Transvaal (9)	Orange Free State (1)			
1927–28					Not contested
1928–29					Not contested
1929–30	Transvaal (10)	Natal (4)			One-off appearance of Rhodesia
1930–31					Not contested
1931–32	Western Province (7)	Transvaal; Rhodesia			One-off appearance of Rhodesia
1932–33					Not contested
1933–34	Natal (3)	Western Province (6)			
1934–35	Transvaal (11)	Natal (5)			
1935–36					Not contested
1936–37	Natal (4)	Transvaal (8)			
1937–38	Transvaal; Natal				First appearance of North Eastern Transvaal
Competition not contested 1938–39 and from 1939–40 to 1945–46 due to World War II
1946–47	Natal (5)	Western Province (7)			First regular appearance of Rhodesia
1947–48	Natal (6)	Transvaal (9)			
1948–49					Not contested
1949–50					Not contested
1950–51	Transvaal (12)	Natal (6)			
1951–52	Natal (7)	Western Province (8)	Orange Free State (1)	Rhodesia (1)	League adapts two-division format Orange Free State promoted Transvaal relegated
1952–53	Western Province (8)	Natal; Orange Free State	Transvaal (1)	Rhodesia (2)	Transvaal promoted Eastern Province relegated
1953–54					Not contested
1954–55	Natal (8)	Transvaal (10)	Eastern Province (1)	Rhodesia (3)	Eastern Province promoted Orange Free State relegated
1955–56	Western Province (9)	Natal (7)	Rhodesia (1)	Border (1)	Rhodesia promoted Eastern Province relegated
1956–57					Not contested
1957–58					Not contested
1958–59	Transvaal (13)	Natal; Rhodesia; Western Province	Border (1)	Eastern Province (1)	Border promoted
1959–60	Natal (9)	Transvaal (11)	Eastern Province; Transvaal B		First appearance of Transvaal B Eastern Province promoted for 1962–63; Border and Rhodesia relegated for 1962–63
1960–61	Natal (10)	Eastern Province (1)			One-off single-division format
1961–62					Not contested
1962–63	Natal (11)	Western Province (9)	Transvaal B (1)	Rhodesia (4)	
1963–64	Natal (12)	Transvaal (12)	Rhodesia (2)	North Eastern Transvaal (1)	Rhodesia promoted
1964–65					Not contested
1965–66	Transvaal; Natal		North Eastern Transvaal (1)	Border (2)	First appearance of Natal B Western Province relegated
1966–67	Natal (13)	Eastern Province; Transvaal	North Eastern Transvaal (2)	Transvaal B Western Province	North Eastern Transvaal promoted Rhodesia relegated
1967–68	Natal (14)	Transvaal (13)	Rhodesia (3)	Natal B (1)	Rhodesia promoted North Eastern Transvaal relegated
1968–69	Transvaal (14)	Natal; Eastern Province	Western Province (1)	Border (3)	Western Province promoted
1969–70	Transvaal; Western Province		Transvaal B (2)	Natal B (2)	Rhodesia relegated
1970–71	Transvaal (15)	Western Province (10)	Rhodesia (4)	Transvaal B (1)	Rhodesia promoted
1971–72	Transvaal (16)	Rhodesia (1)	Northern Transvaal (3)	Transvaal B (2)	North Eastern Transvaal now known as Northern Transvaal
1972–73	Transvaal (17)	Eastern Province (2)	Transvaal B (3)	Orange Free State (1)	
1973–74	Natal (15)	Western Province (11)	Natal B (1)	Orange Free State (2)	
1974–75	Western Province (10)	Natal (8)	Transvaal B (4)	Griqualand West (1)	
1975–76	Natal (16)	Eastern Province (3)	Orange Free State (2)	Transvaal B Western Province B	First appearance of Western Province B
1976–77	Natal (17)	Transvaal (14)	Transvaal B (5)	Western Province B (2)	
1977–78	Western Province (11)	Transvaal (15)	Northern Transvaal (4)	Border (4)	First appearances of Rhodesia B and Eastern Province B
1978–79	Transvaal (18)	Western Province (12)	Northern Transvaal (5)	Border (5)	Once-off season with no B-teams competing in the Bowl; Northern Transvaal promoted
1979–80	Transvaal (19)	Western Province (13)	Natal B (2)	Western Province B (2)	Final appearance of Rhodesia and Rhodesia B
1980–81	Natal (18)	Transvaal (16)	Western Province B (1)	Transvaal B (3)	First appearance of Boland (Bowl)
1981–82	Western Province (12)	Transvaal (17)	Boland (1)	Western Province B (3)	First appearance of Northern Transvaal B (Bowl)
1982–83	Transvaal (20)	Western Province (14)	Western Province B (2)	Transvaal B (4)	
1983–84	Transvaal (21)	Western Province (15)	Western Province B (3)	Border (6)	
1984–85	Transvaal (22)	Northern Transvaal (1)	Transvaal B (6)	Orange Free State (3)	Border and Orange Free State promoted
1985–86	Western Province (13)	Transvaal (18)	Boland (2)	Western Province B (4)	
1986–87	Transvaal (23)	Western Province (16)	Transvaal B (7)	Natal B (3)	Border relegated
1987–88	Transvaal (24)	Orange Free State (2)	Boland (3)	Transvaal B (5)	
1988–89	Eastern Province (1)	Transvaal (19)	Boland (4)	Transvaal B (6)	
1989–90	Eastern Province; Western Province		Border; Western Province B		First appearance of Orange Free State B (Bowl)
1990–91	Western Province (14)	Transvaal (20)	Border; Western Province B		Border promoted
1991–92	Eastern Province (2)	Orange Free State (3)	Eastern Transvaal (1)	Boland (1)	First appearances of Eastern Transvaal and Western Transvaal; No B-teams in Bowl competition
1992–93	Orange Free State (1)	Eastern Province; Natal; Transvaal	Boland (5)	Griqualand West (2)	No B-teams in Bowl competition
1993–94	Orange Free State (2)	Western Province (17)	Transvaal B (8)	Western Province B (5)	B-teams again compete in Bowl competition First appearances of Border B, Boland B and Zimbabwe Board XI
1994–95	Natal (19)	Northern Transvaal (2)	Natal B (3)	Eastern Transvaal (1)	
1995–96	Western Province (15)	Transvaal (21)	Natal B Griqualand West		Orange Free State now known as Free State; Eastern Transvaal now known as Easterns; Griqualand West promoted
1996–97	Natal (20)	Western Province (18)	Eastern Province B (1)	Easterns (2)	Western Transvaal now known as North West
1997–98	Orange Free State (3)	Eastern Province (4)	North West (1)	Northerns B (1)	Northern Transvaal now known as Northerns; Transvaal now known as Gauteng
1998–99	Western Province (16)	Border (1)	North West (2)	Western Province B (6)	First appearance of Griqualand West B Natal now known as KwaZulu-Natal; Easterns and North West promoted Final first class season of Bowl
1999–2000	Gauteng (25)	Border (2)			
2000–01	Western Province (17)	Border (3)			
2001–02	KwaZulu-Natal (21)	Northerns (3)			
2002–03	Easterns (1)	Western Province (19)			
2003–04	Western Province (18)	KwaZulu-Natal (9)			
2004–05	Eagles; Dolphins				Eleven provincial teams reduced to six combined teams
2005–06	Titans; Dolphins				
2006–07	Titans (1)	Lions (1)			
2007–08	Eagles (1)	Warriors (1)			
2008–09	Titans (2)	Eagles (1)			
2009–10	Cape Cobras (1)	Titans (1)			
2010–11	Cape Cobras (2)	Titans (2)			Eagles now known as Knights
2011–12	Titans (3)	Cape Cobras (1)			
2012–13	Cape Cobras (3)	Lions (2)			
2013–14	Cape Cobras (4)	Knights (2)			
2014–15	Lions (1)	Titans (3)			
2015–16	Titans (4)	Lions (2)			
2016–17	Knights (2)	Titans (4)			
2017–18	Titans (5)	Warriors (2)			
2018–19	Lions (2)	Cape Cobras (2)			
2019–20	Lions (3)	Titans (5)			Series ended after 8 rounds due to COVID-19
2020–21	Dolphins (1)	Titans (6)			
2021–22	Titans (6)	Warriors (3)			
2022–23	Dolphins (2)	Warriors (4)			
2023–24	Lions (4)				
2024–25	Gauteng (26)	Northerns			
2025–26	Gauteng (27)	Eastern Province			

*Numbers in parentheses count outright championships only.

== Championships ==
=== Combined team era ===
Club	Seasons	Outright wins	Shared wins	Total wins	Seconds
Titans	17	5	1	6	6
Cape Cobras	17	4	–	4	2
Eagles/Knights	17	2	1	3	2
Lions	17	3	–	3	3
Dolphins	17	2	2	3	0
Warriors	17	0	–	0	2

=== Currie Cup – provincial era ===
Club	Seasons	Outright wins	Shared wins	Total wins	Seconds
Transvaal/Gauteng	75	25	4	29	21
Natal/KwaZulu-Natal	71	21	3	24	9
Western Province	71	18	3	21	19
Orange Free State	40	3	–	3	3
Eastern Province	66	2	1	3	4
Kimberley/Griqualand West	34	1	–	1	2
Eastern Transvaal/Easterns	5	1	–	1	0
North Eastern Transvaal/ Northern Transvaal/Northerns	31	0	–	0	3
Border	35	0	–	0	3
Rhodesia/Zimbabwe-Rhodesia	22	0	–	0	1
Western Transvaal/North West	5	0	–	0	0
Boland	11	0	–	0	0

Note: Transvaal B and South West Districts are not shown in the table. Each contested only one season in the top division, and neither finished in the top two.

=== Currie Cup Second Division and Bowl Competition ===
Club	Seasons	Outright wins	Shared wins	Total wins	Seconds
Transvaal B/Gauteng B	32	8	1	9	6
Boland	13	5	–	5	1
North Eastern Transvaal/ Northern Transvaal/Northerns	21	5	–	5	1
Rhodesia/Zimbabwe-Rhodesia	8	4	–	4	4
Western Province B	21	3	2	5	6
Natal B/KwaZulu-Natal B	31	3	1	4	3
Orange Free State/Free State	26	2	–	2	3
Western Transvaal/North West	8	2	–	2	0
Border	31	1	2	3	6
Eastern Transvaal/Easterns	8	1	–	1	2
Eastern Province	3	1	1	2	1
Transvaal/Gauteng	1	1	–	1	0
Western Province	3	1	–	1	0
Eastern Province B	19	1	–	1	0
Kimberley/Griqualand West	39	0	1	1	2
Northern Transvaal B/Northerns B	15	0	–	0	1

Note: Includes only Currie Cup lower division and Bowl seasons with full first-class status.

Note: To minimise the size of the table, teams which contested five or fewer seasons without winning or placing second are not shown. These teams were: Orange Free State B/Free State B, Rhodesia B/Zimbabwe-Rhodesia B, Griqualand West B, Zimbabwe Board XI, Border B and Boland B.

== Notable performances ==
Two double centuries in a season

- Dudley Nourse 1936–37

Five centuries in successive innings

- Mike Procter 1970–71

Five centuries in six innings

- Peter Kirsten 1976–77

Five wickets in six balls

- William Henderson 1937–38

Four wickets with consecutive balls

- Albert Borland 1926–27
- Bob Crisp 1931–32
- Bob Crisp 1933–34
- William Henderson 1937–38

Ten wickets in an innings

- Bert Vogler 10/26 1906–07
- Stephen Jefferies 10/59 1987–88
- Mario Olivier 10/65 2007–08
- Sean Whitehead 10/36 2021–22

Fifteen wickets in a match

- George Glover 15/68 1893–94
- Bert Vogler 16/38 1906–07
- Buster Nupen 16/136 1931–32
- Jackie Botten 15/49 1958–59
- Sean Whitehead 15/100 2021–22

A 100 runs and 10 wickets in a match

- Aubrey Faulkner 1908–09
- Xenophon Balaskas, twice 1929–30
- Lennox Brown 1937–38
- James Liddle 1951–52
- Percy Mansell 1951–52
- Clive Rice 1975–76

Ten wicketkeeping dismissals in a match

- Ray Jennings 1982–83
- Richie Ryall 1984–85
- Ray Jennings 1986–87
- Ray Jennings 1986–87
- Dave Richardson 1988–89
- Dave Richardson 1989–90
- Dane Vilas 2008–09
- Morne van Wyk 2008–09

== Individual records ==
7000 runs in a career

Runs	Player	Matches	Centuries
12409	Graeme Pollock	157	35
11835	Peter Kirsten	162	29
11307	Jimmy Cook	163	32
8487	Kepler Wessels	116	22
7981	Henry Fotheringham	132	19
7551	Barry Richards	79	26

800 runs in a season

Season	Runs	Player	Matches
1947–48	864	Dudley Nourse	8
1971–72	1089	Barry Richards	8
1972–73	1064	Barry Richards	8
1973–74	898	Barry Richards	8
1975–76	868	Barry Richards	8
1975–76	810	Graeme Pollock	8
1976–77	967	Peter Kirsten	8
1978–79	961	Graeme Pollock	8
1987–88	878	Allan Lamb	6
1988–89	846	Ken McEwan	8
1990–91	994	Mandy Yachad	10
1996–97	815	Louis Koen	8
1997–98	866	H. D. Ackerman	8
1997–98	847	Kepler Wessels	8
1998–99	938	Boeta Dippenaar	8
1998–99	810	Ken Rutherford	8
1999-00	818	Ken Rutherford	10
2001–02	934	Martin van Jaarsveld	8
2003–04	1015	Zander de Bruyn	9
2004–05	827	Arno Jacobs	10
2005–06	893	Hashim Amla	11
2006–07	828	Vaughn van Jaarsveld	10
2006–07	817	Henry Davids	10
2008–09	835	Imraan Khan	10
2008–09	809	Ashwell Prince	9
2009–10	1189	Rilee Rossouw	10
2009–10	1060	Dean Elgar	10
2009–10	1013	Stephen Cook	10
2010–11	954	Jacques Rudolph	10
2011–12	816	Alviro Petersen	10
2013–14	933	Stiaan van Zyl	10
2013–14	927	Justin Ontong	10
2013–14	882	David White	10
2014–15	889	Stephen Cook	10
2014–15	852	Colin Ingram	10
2015–16	1,126	Heino Kuhn	10
2016–17	883	Colin Ackermann	10
2017–18	959	Rassie van der Dussen	10
2017–18	898	Vaughn van Jaarsveld	10
2017–18	892	Pieter Malan	10
2017–18	828	Zubayr Hamza	9
2018-19	923	Keegan Petersen	9
2018-19	921	Eddie Moore	10
2018-19	821	Pieter Malan	10
2019-20	843	Raynard van Tonder	8
2020-21	945	Aiden Markram	7

Highest individual scores

Runs	Player	Season
390	Stephen Cook	2009–10
337	Daryll Cullinan	1993–94
319	Rilee Rossouw	2009–10
304*	Tony de Zorzi	2022–23
294	Allan Lamb	1987–88
292	Heinrich Klaasen	2022-23
279	Raymond Gripper	1967–68
277*	Eric Rowan	1950–51
271*	Jack Cheetham	1950–51
271	Peter Kirsten	1993–94
266*	Zander de Bruyn	2003–04
265*	Jack Siedle	1929–30
264	Pieter Malan	2020-21
261*	Stephen Steyn	1929–31
260	Dudley Nourse	1936–37

300 wickets in a career

Wickets	Player	Matches
572	Vintcent van der Bijl	109
365	Garth Le Roux	83
347	Kenny Watson	108
323	Rupert Hanley	82
319	Denys Hobson	90
317	John Waddington	59

50 wickets in a season

Wickets	Player	Season	Matches
52	Alfred Hall	1926–27	6
53	John Waddington	1952–53	6
55	Jackie Botten	1958–59	6
50	Mike Procter	1972–73	8
59	Mike Procter	1976–77	8
53	Garth Le Roux	1977–78	8
54	Vintcent van der Bijl	1980–81	8
52	Alan Kourie	1980–81	8
57	Vintcent van der Bijl	1981–82	8
50	Pienaar Anker	1981–82	7
58	Sylvester Clarke	1984–85	10
51	Eric Simons	1984–85	10
50	Corrie van Zyl	1984–85	6
50	Alan Kourie	1984–85	10
54	Steven Jack	1990–91	10
56	Vasbert Drakes	1998–99	8
60	Vasbert Drakes	1999-00	10
52	Steve Elworthy	2001–02	8
54	Ryan McLaren	2006–07	10
55	Dillon du Preez	2007–08	10
54	Monde Zondeki	2007–08	10
54	Monde Zondeki	2007–08	10
52	Duanne Olivier	2016–17	8
54	Dane Piedt	2018-19	10

All-round play 3000 runs and 300 wickets

Player	Matches	Runs	Wickets	Catches
Eddie Barlow	122	7881	317	152
Clive Rice	164	7714	396	112
Mike Procter	110	5405	471	98
Alan Kourie	107	3962	378	124
Omar Henry	103	3890	375	109

All-round double, 400 runs and 40 wickets in a season

Season	Player	Runs	Wickets
1971–72	Mike Procter	495	44
1972–73	Mike Procter	474	50
1972–73	Eddie Barlow	488	40
1979–80	Mike Procter	420	45
1979–80	Clive Rice	409	41

Wicketkeeping

Player	Matches	Dismissals	Runs	10Dis match	40Dis season
Ray Jennings	137	538	3622	3	2
Richie Ryall	111	388	1301	1	2
Dave Richardson	119	344	4276	2	
Noel Day	101	337	4482		1

== Sponsorship ==
Between 1889–90 and 1990–91, the tournament was named the "Currie Cup" after Sir Donald Currie, the founder of the Castle Shipping Line, who had sponsored the first English tour to South Africa and donated a trophy for the domestic champions.

The competition took its first title sponsor for the 1990–91 season, becoming the "Castle Cup", and from 1996–97 the broadcaster SuperSport assumed naming rights as the "SuperSport Series".

For the 2012–13 season, the competition was renamed once again, becoming the "Sunfoil Series" after the Willowton Group formed a partnership with Cricket South Africa. This agreement lasted until 2018–19 after Willowton Group withdrew sponsorship.

The competition has been rebranded as the CSA 4-Day Domestic Series due to the lack of a title sponsor.
