= 2026–27 CSA 4-Day Series =

Cricket tournament in South Africa

- Dates: September 2026 – April 2027
- Administrator: Cricket South Africa
- Cricket format: First-class
- Tournament format: Single round-robin
- Participants: Div 1: 8 Div 2: 7
- Matches: 84; Div 1: 41; Div 2: 43

The 2026–27 CSA 4-Day Franchise Series was the 120th CSA 4-Day Domestic Series cricket season in South Africa. Division 1 teams compete in the 1st Class Series, while Division 2 teams compete in the 1st Class Shield. The season began in September 2026 and ends in April 2027.

The competition forms part of Cricket South Africa's revamped domestic cricket structure for the 2026–27 season.

== Teams ==
The following teams will take part in the CSA 4-Day Domestic Series.

=== Division One teams ===
Team	Primary home ground	Captain	Coach	Province
Boland	Boland Park, Paarl		Justin Ontong	Western Cape
Dolphins	Kingsmead, Durban		Quinton Friend	KwaZulu-Natal
DP World Lions	Wanderers Stadium, Johannesburg		Russell Domingo	Gauteng
Knights	Mangaung Oval, Bloemfontein		JP Triegaardt	Free State
North West Dragons	JB Marks Oval, Potchefstroom		Craig Alexander	North West
Titans	Centurion Park, Centurion, South Africa		Rivash Gobind	Gauteng
Warriors	St George's Park, Gqeberha		Robin Peterson	Eastern Cape
Western Province	Newlands, Cape Town		Rory Kleinveldt	Western Cape

Team promoted from Division Two in 2025

=== Division Two teams ===
Team	Primary home ground	Captain	Coach	Province
Border	Buffalo Park, East London		Rowan Richards	Eastern Cape
Easterns	Willowmoore Park, Benoni		Tumelo Bodibe	Gauteng
KwaZulu-Natal Inland	City Oval, Pietermaritzburg		Ahmed Amla	KwaZulu-Natal
Limpopo	Polokwane Cricket Club, Polokwane		Gurshwin Rabie	Limpopo
Mpumalanga	Uplands College, White River		Mbasa Gqadushe	Mpumalanga
Northern Cape	De Beers Diamond Oval, Kimberley		Gordon Parsons	Northern Cape
South Western Districts	Recreation Ground, Oudtshoorn		Letlotle Sesele	Western Cape

Team relegated from Division One in 2025

== Division One ==
2026–27 1st Class Series
- Dates: 10 September 2026 – 26 April 2027
- Administrator: Cricket South Africa
- Cricket format: First-class
- Tournament format: Single round-robin
- Participants: 8
- Matches: 41

=== Points table ===
Pos	Team	Pld	W	L	D	Pts
1	Lions	0	0	0	0	0
2	Warriors	0	0	0	0	0
3	Dolphins	0	0	0	0	0
4	Boland	0	0	0	0	0
5	North West	0	0	0	0	0
6	Western Province	0	0	0	0	0
7	Titans	0	0	0	0	0
8	Knights	0	0	0	0	0

Updated to match(es) played on 29 September 2026. Source: Cricinfo

== Division Two ==
2026–27 1st Class Shield
- Dates: 10 September 2026 – 8 April 2027
- Administrator: Cricket South Africa
- Cricket format: First-class
- Tournament format: Single round-robin
- Participants: 7
- Matches: 43

=== Points table ===
Pos	Team	Pld	W	L	D	Pts	Qualification
1	Border	0	0	0	0	0	Advanced to the Final
2	Eastern Storm	0	0	0	0	0	Advanced to the Final
3	KwaZulu-Natal Inland	0	0	0	0	0	
4	Limpopo	0	0	0	0	0	
5	Mpumalanga	0	0	0	0	0	
6	Northern Cape	0	0	0	0	0	
7	South Western Districts	0	0	0	0	0	

Updated to match(es) played on 29 September 2026. Source: Cricinfo
Rules for classification: Points system: 16 for a win, 8 for a tie, 6 for a draw.
- Batting bonus points: in the first innings only, 1 point for reaching 150 runs, then 0.02 points for each run thereafter.
- Bowling bonus points: in the first innings only, 1 point for taking three wickets, then 1 point for each two wickets thereafter.

== See also ==
- 2026–27 1st Class Series
- 2026–27 1st Class Shield
