= 2026–27 Pro20 Cup =

Cricket tournament

- Dates: 25 September 2026 – 14 November 2026
- Administrator: Cricket South Africa
- Cricket format: Twenty20
- Tournament format(s): Group stage and knockout
- Host: South Africa
- Champions: Warriors (1st title)
- Runners-up: Lions
- Participants: 16
- Matches: 71
- Most runs: Lhuan-dre Pretorius (463)
- Most wickets: Beuran Hendricks (17)

The 2026–27 Pro20 Cup was the inaugural season of the Pro20 Cup, a Twenty20 cricket competition in South Africa. organized by Cricket South Africa The tournament ran from 25 September to 14 November 2026.

The CSA T20 Challenge and CSA T20 Knock-Out competitions were merged and rebranded as the Pro20 Cup. It was the 23th edition of South Africa's Twenty20 cricket competition overall. first contested in the 2003–04 season. The competition forms part of Cricket South Africa's revamped domestic cricket structure for the 2026–27 season.

== Background ==
In August 2026, the CSA announced that the 2026–27 tournament will be held from 25 September to 14 November 2026. The tournament was a part of the 2026–27 South African domestic cricket season. The Tournament sponsored by YesPlay.

=== Format ===
In August 2026, the CSA announced a new format for the tournament. The 16 teams will be divided into two groups of eight each. In the group stage, each team will play each of the other teams in the group once in a round-robin format. The top four teams in each group will advance to the Super 8 stage.

The Super 8 stage consists of eight qualified teams, divided into two groups of four teams each. Each team carries forward its results, points and net run rate from the group-stage matches played against the other three teams that qualified from the same group. These matches count towards each team's Super 8 standings, even though they are not played again during this stage.

Teams then play four matches against the four qualifying teams from the opposite group. The points and net run rate earned in these matches are added to the carried-forward figures to determine the final Super 8 standings. The top two teams from each group advance to the semi-finals.

Pool A	Pool B
Dafabet Boland; Easterns Storm; Flexbrands Knights; South Africa Emerging Players; Momentum Multiply Titans; Mpumalanga Rhinos; Tuskers; YesPlay Cobras	Dafabet Warriors; DP World Lions; Eastern Cape Iinyathi; Hollywoodbets Dolphins; Garden Route Badgers; Northern Cape Heat; North West Dragons; Wenbro Impalas

=== Teams ===
Team	Captain	Head coach	Assistant coach
Western Province		Rory Kleinveldt	Qaasim Adams
Boland		Justin Ontong	Henry Williams
Titans		Rivash Gobind	Albie Morkel
Lions		Russell Domingo	Jimmy Kgamadi
Knights		JP Triegaardt	Ruan Dercksen
Warriors		Robin Peterson	Mark Charlton
Dolphins		Quinton Friend	Henry Davids
North West		Craig Alexander	Neil Levenson
Tuskers		Ahmed Amla	Yusuf Abdulla
Easterns		Tumelo Bodibe	Gerhard Vosloo
Mpumalanga		Mbasa Gqadushe	Onke Mtsiba
Limpopo		Gurshwin Rabie	Jongile Kilani
Northern Cape		Gordon Parsons	Tom Khoza
Border		Rowan Richards	Ephraim Nyawo
South Western Districts		Letlotle Sesele	Warren Bell

- Source: CSA

== Squads ==
Division 1
Boland	Dolphins	Knights	Lions	North West Dragons	Titans	Warriors	Western Province
Lizaad Williams; Neil Brand; Glenton Stuurman; Gavin Kaplan; Jhedli van Briesies; Akhona Mnyaka; Blayde Capell; Jevano Baron; Ethan Cunningham; Clyde Fortuin; Imraan Manack; Ferisco Adams; Lehan Botha; Siyabonga Mahima; Nathan Jacobs; Ruan Terblanche	Jason Smith; Prenelan Subrayen; Marques Ackerman; Okuhle Cele; Nqobani Mokoena; Khaya Zondo; Grant Roelofsen; Josh Richards; Andile Simelane; Keith Dudgeon; Bryce Parsons; Hanu Viljoen; Romashan Pillay; Tristan Luus; David Miller; Bayanda Majola; Semal Pillay	Jacques Snyman; Isaac Dikgale; Gihahn Cloete; Cole Abrahams; Ruan Haasbroek; Tiaan van Vuuren; Dane Piedt; Malusi Siboto; Ruben Maree; George van Heerden; Wian Ruthven; Lesego Senokwane; Emmanuel Motswiri; Ntando Soni; Nico van Zyl; Junaid Dawood; Seth Fledermaus; Mbongi Mhlanga; Jono Bird; Ross Boast	Bjorn Fortuin; Reeza Hendricks; Rassie van der Dussen; Dominic Hendricks; Lutho Sipamla; Mitchell van Buuren; Codi Yusuf; Delano Potgieter; Connor Esterhuizen; Zubayr Hamza; Nqaba Peter; Richard Seletswane; Wandile Makwetu; Siya Plaatjie; Tiaan Brits; Gerald Coetzee; Quinton de Kock	Wihan Lubbe; Raynard van Tonder; Daryn Dupavillon; Rubin Hermann; Dian Forrester; Ruan de Swardt; Ludwich Schuld; Lesiba Ngoepe; Onke Nyaku; Alfred Mothoa; Caleb Seleka; Mthiwekhaya Nabe; Diego Rosier; Jade de Klerk; Meeka-eel Prince; Juan James	Rivaldo Moonsamy; Keegan Petersen; Tshepang Dithole; Evan Jones; Andile Phehlukwayo; Sinethemba Qeshile; Duan Jansen; Dayyaan Galiem; Keagan Lion-Cachet; Tsepo Ndwandwa; Lhuan-dre Pretorius; Junior Dala; Donovan Ferreira; Eathan Bosch; Leus du Plooy; Aphiwe Mnyanda; Beyers Swanepoel	Thomas Kaber; JP King; Patrick Kruger; Matthew de Villiers; Beuran Hendricks; Matthew Boast; Wesley Bedja; Modiri Litheko; Sibonelo Makhanya; Jordan Hermann; Jean du Plessis; Duanne Olivier; Andile Mokgakane; Gideon Peters; Kerwin Mungroo; Muhammad Manack	Dane Paterson; Daniel Smith; Eddie Moore; George Linde; Jiveshan Pillay; Josh van Heerden; Josh Breed; Kyle Simmonds; Mihlali Mpongwana; Mbulelo Dube; Nandre Burger; Oliver Whitehead; Raeeq Daniels; Tshepo Moreki; Valentine Kitime

Division 2
Border	Easterns	Tuskers	Limpopo	Mpumalanga	Northern Cape	South Western Districts
Nathan Roux; Jerome Bossr; Lihle Sizani; Christiaan du Toit; Jason Niemand; Mncedisi Malika; Michael Copeland; Kgaudisi Molefe; Hardus Coetzer; Thando Ntini; Sithembile Langa	Ronan Herrmann; Merrick Brett; Aryan Gopalan; Chad Classen; Jurie Snyman; Tumelo Simelane; Amaan Khan; Dewan Marais; Martin Khumalo; Chris Britz; Kabelo Sekhukhune	Michael Erlank; Malcolm Nofal; Ludwig Kaestner; Cameron Shekleton; Jack Lees; Bamanye Xenxe; Chad Laycock; Liyema Waqu; Thabiso Ndlela; Ziyaad Abrahams; Jesse Albanie; Kagiso Rapulana	Marcello Piedt; Ernest Kemm; Abdallah Bayoumy; Tylor Trenoweth; Don Radebe; Atwell Mokgolobot	Yassar Cook; Muhammed Mayet; Zakir Kathrada; Aubrey Swanepoel; Tetelo Maphaka; Thobile Hlatukha; Karabo Magotsi; Jon Hinrichsen; Garnett Tarr; Bryn Brokensha; Ricus Kramm	Steve Stolk; Odirile Modimokoane; Kyle Jacobs; Charl Prinsloo; Nonelela Yikha; GJ Maree; Johan van Dyk; Tshepo Ntuli; Blake Simpson; Romano Terblanche; Tahir Isaacs	Liam Alder; Banele Cele; Beni Hansen; Zack Momberg; Pheko Moletsane; Nathan Engelbrecht; Yaseen Valli; Janneman Malan; Slade van Staden; Leo Sadler; Modise Maloka

- Source:CSA

== Venues ==
Cape Town	Centurion	Durban	Pietermaritzburg
Newlands Cricket Ground	Centurion Park	Kingsmead Cricket Ground	City Oval
Capacity: 25,000	Capacity: 22,000	Capacity: 25,000	Capacity: 12,000
2026–27 Pro20 Cup (South Africa)
Gqeberha	Johannesburg	Paarl	Cape Town
St George's Park Cricket Ground	Wanderers Stadium	Boland Park	Cape Town Stadium
Capacity: 19,000	Capacity: 34,000	Capacity: 10,000	Capacity: 57,000

== Group stage ==
The 16 teams will be divided into two groups of eight with each team facing the other teams in the group. The group stage will feature a total of 56 matches.

=== Standing ===
Pool A standings
Pos	Team	Pld	W	L	NR	Pts	NRR	Qualification
1	Titans	7	6	1	0	24	3.336	Advance to the Super 8 stage
2	Boland	7	6	1	0	24	0.953	Advance to the Super 8 stage
3	Western Province	7	6	1	0	24	0.264	Advance to the Super 8 stage
4	Eastern	7	2	4	1	10	−0.745	Advance to the Super 8 stage
5	Knights	7	2	5	0	8	−1.671	Eliminated
6	Tuskers	7	2	4	1	10	−1.052	Eliminated
7	Mpumalanga	7	2	4	1	10	−0.889	Eliminated
8	South Africa Emerging Players	7	0	6	1	2	−1.961	Eliminated

Updated to match(es) played on 26 October 2026. Source: Cricinfo SuperSport Cricbuzz

Pool B standings
Pos	Team	Pld	W	L	NR	Pts	NRR	Qualification
1	Dolphins	7	5	2	0	20	2.564	Advance to the Super 8 stage
2	Lions	7	5	1	1	22	0.542	Advance to the Super 8 stage
3	Warriors	7	4	2	1	18	2.030	Advance to the Super 8 stage
4	South Western Districts	7	4	3	0	16	−0.717	Advance to the Super 8 stage
5	North West	7	3	3	1	14	−0.037	Eliminated
6	Border	7	3	3	1	14	−0.657	Eliminated
7	Northern Cape	7	1	4	2	8	−3.441	Eliminated
8	Limpopo	7	0	7	0	0	−1.360	Eliminated

Updated to match(es) played on 26 October 2026. Source: Cricinfo SuperSport Cricbuzz

=== Fixtures ===
Pool A
25 September 2026
Scorecard

Warriors; 128/6 (20 overs)	v	North West; 131/3 (15.3 overs)

North West won by 7 wickets
SuperSport Park, Centurion

- North West won the toss and elected to field.

Pool B
25 September 2026 (N)
Scorecard

Western Province; 186/4 (20 overs)	v	Titans; 190/5 (14.5 overs)

Titans won by 5 wickets
SuperSport Park, Centurion

- Titans won the toss and elected to field.

Pool A
26 September 2026
Scorecard

Northern Cape	v	Border

Match abandoned due to rain
Diamond Oval, Kimberley

- no toss

Pool A
27 September 2026
Scorecard

Lions; 202/4 (20 overs)	v	Dolphins; 194/6 (20 overs)

Lions won by 8 runs
Kingsmead, Durban

- Lions won the toss and elected to bat.

Pool B
27 September 2026
Scorecard

Mpumalanga; 75/2 (6 overs)	v	Titans; 79/1 (5 overs)

Titans won by 9 wickets
Uplands College, White River

- Mpumalanga won the toss and elected to bat.

Pool B
27 September 2026 (N)
Scorecard

Knights; 168/7 (20 overs)	v	Western Province; 169/5 (19.4 overs)

Western Province won by 5 wickets
Newlands, Cape Town

- Western Province won the toss and elected to field.

Pool A
28 September 2026
Scorecard

Border; 151/4 (20 overs)	v	North West; 138/9 (20 overs)

Border won by 13 runs
Buffalo Park, KuGumpo City

- North West won the toss and elected to field.

=== Update ===
Pool B
29 September 2026
13:00
Scorecard

South Africa Emerging Players	v	Tuskers

LC de Villiers Oval, Pretoria

Pool A
29 September 2026
14:00
Scorecard

Warriors	v	Limpopo

St George's Park, Gqeberha

Pool B
29 September 2026
18:00 (N)
Scorecard

Boland	v	Knights

Boland Park, Paarl

Pool B
30 September 2026
13:00
Scorecard

Eastern	v	Mpumalanga

Willowmoore Park, Benoni

Pool A
30 September 2026
18:00 (N)
Scorecard

Dolphins	v	Northern Cape

Kingsmead, Durban

Pool A
1 October 2026
13:00
Scorecard

South Western Districts	v	Border

Recreation Ground, Oudtshoorn

Pool B
2 October 2026
13:00
Scorecard

Mpumalanga	v	Tuskers

Uplands College, White River

Pool B
2 October 2026
18:00 (N)
Scorecard

Knights	v	Titans

Mangaung Oval, Bloemfontein

Pool A
2 October 2026
18:00 (N)
Scorecard

Lions	v	North West

The Wanderers Stadium, Johannesburg

Pool B
4 October 2026
13:00
Scorecard

Tuskers	v	Boland

City Oval, Pietermaritzburg

Pool A
4 October 2026
13:00
Scorecard

Limpopo	v	Dolphins

Polokwane Cricket Club, Polokwane

Pool A
4 October 2026
18:00 (N)
Scorecard

Warriors	v	Lions

St George's Park, Gqeberha

Pool B
4 October 2026
18:00 (N)
Scorecard

Western Province	v	South Africa Emerging Players

Newlands, Cape Town

Pool A
5 October 2026
13:00
Scorecard

Limpopo	v	South Western Districts

Polokwane Cricket Club, Polokwane

Pool B
6 October 2026
18:00 (N)
Scorecard

Western Province	v	Eastern

Newlands, Cape Town

Pool A
7 October 2026
13:00
Scorecard

South Western Districts	v	Lions

Recreation Ground, Oudtshoorn

Pool B
7 October 2026
18:00 (N)
Scorecard

Knights	v	Tuskers

Mangaung Oval, Bloemfontein

Pool B
7 October 2026
6:00 PM (N)
Scorecard

Titans	v	SA Emerging Players

SuperSport Park, Centurion

Pool B
8 October 2026
18:00 (N)
Scorecard

Boland	v	Eastern

Boland Park, Paarl

Pool A
8 October 2026
18:00 (N)
Scorecard

Warriors	v	Northern Cape

St George's Park, Gqeberha

Pool A
9 October 2026
13:00
Scorecard

Border	v	Dolphins

Buffalo Park, East London

Pool B
10 October 2026
13:00
Scorecard

Mpumalanga	v	Western Province

Uplands College, White River

Pool A
10 October 2026
18:00 (N)
Scorecard

North West	v	South Western Districts

Senwes Park, Potchefstroom

Pool B
11 October 2026
1:00 PM

Titans	v	Eastern

SuperSport Park, Centurion

Pool B
11 October 2026
1:00 PM

South Africa Emerging Players	v	Boland

LC de Villiers Oval, Pretoria

Pool B
13 October 2026
1:00 PM

Tuskers	v	Titans

City Oval, Pietermaritzburg

Pool A
13 October 2026
1:00 PM

Northern Cape	v	Limpopo

Diamond Oval, Kimberley

Pool A
13 October 2026
6:00 PM (N)

Lions	v	Border

The Wanderers Stadium, Johannesburg

Pool A
13 October 2026
6:00 PM (N)

North West	v	Dolphins

Senwes Park, Potchefstroom

Pool B
14 October 2026
6:00 PM (N)

Knights	v	Eastern

Mangaung Oval, Bloemfontein

Pool B
14 October 2026
6:00 PM (N)

Western Province	v	Boland

Newlands, Cape Town

Pool A
16 October 2026
1:00 PM

North West	v	Dolphins

Senwes Park, Potchefstroom

Pool B
16 October 2026
1:00 PM

Tuskers	v	Titans

City Oval, Pietermaritzburg

Pool B
17 October 2026
6:00 PM (N)

Western Province	v	Boland

Newlands, Cape Town

=== Upcoming Fixtures ===
Pool A
18 October 2026
1:00 PM

South Western Districts	v	Warriors

Recreation Ground, Oudtshoorn

Pool B
18 October 2026
6:00 PM (N)

Knights	v	Eastern

Mangaung Oval, Bloemfontein

Pool A
20 October 2026
1:00 PM

Limpopo	v	Border

Polokwane Cricket Club, Polokwane

Pool A
21 October 2026
1:00 PM

Lions	v	Northern Cape

The Wanderers Stadium, Johannesburg

Pool B
21 October 2026
6:00 PM (N)

Boland	v	Mpumalanga

Boland Park, Paarl

Pool B
22 October 2026
1:00 PM

South Africa Emerging Players	v	Knights

LC de Villiers Oval, Pretoria

Pool A
22 October 2026
1:00 PM

Dolphins	v	Warriors

Kingsmead, Durban

Pool A
23 October 2026
6:00 PM (N)

North West	v	Limpopo

Senwes Park, Potchefstroom

Pool A
24 October 2026
1:00 PM

Northern Cape	v	South Western Districts

Diamond Oval, Kimberley

Pool B
24 October 2026
1:00 PM

Eastern	v	Tuskers

Willowmoore Park, Benoni

Pool B
24 October 2026
1:00 PM

Mpumalanga	v	South Africa Emerging Players

Uplands College, White River

Pool A
24 October 2026
1:00 PM

Lions	v	Limpopo

The Wanderers Stadium, Johannesburg

Pool A
24 October 2026
1:00 PM

Border	v	Warriors

Buffalo Park, East London

Pool B
24 October 2026
6:00 PM (N)

Knights	v	Mpumalanga

Mangaung Oval, Bloemfontein

Pool B
25 October 2026
1:00 PM

Eastern	v	South Africa Emerging Players

Willowmoore Park, Benoni

Pool B
25 October 2026
1:00 PM

Tuskers	v	Western Province

City Oval, Pietermaritzburg

Pool A
25 October 2026
1:00 PM

North West	v	Northern Cape

Senwes Park, Potchefstroom

Pool A
25 October 2026
1:00 PM

Dolphins	v	South Western Districts

Kingsmead, Durban

Pool B
25 October 2026
1:00 PM

Boland	v	Titans

Boland Park, Paarl

== Super 8 stage ==
The Super 8 stage consists of eight qualified teams, divided into two groups of four teams each. Each team carries forward its results, points and net run rate from the group-stage matches played against the other three teams that qualified from the same group. These matches count towards each team's Super 8 standings, even though they are not played again during this stage.

Teams then play four matches against the four qualifying teams from the opposite group. The points and net run rate earned in these matches are added to the carried-forward figures to determine the final Super 8 standings. The top two teams from each group advance to the semi-finals.

Qualification		Super 8 stage			
Advanced from the group stage (Top 4 teams from each group)	A	Titans	Boland	Western Province	Eastern
Advanced from the group stage (Top 4 teams from each group)	B	Dolphins	Lions	Warriors	South Western Districts

=== Standing ===
Super8 standings
Pos	Team	Pld	W	L	NR	Pts	NRR	Qualification
1	Warriors	3	2	0	1	10	3.033	Advance to the semi-finals
2	Lions	4	3	0	1	14	1.201	Advance to the semi-finals
3	Western Province	3	2	1	0	8	−0.117	Advance to the semi-finals
4	Boland	3	2	1	0	8	−0.039	Advance to the semi-finals
5	South Western Districts	4	1	3	0	4	−2.302	Eliminated
6	Titans	4	2	2	0	8	1.764	Eliminated
7	Dolphins	3	1	2	0	4	−0.348	Eliminated
8	Eastern	4	0	4	0	0	−2.158	Eliminated

Updated to match(es) played on 14 November 2026. Source: Cricinfo Cricbuzz

=== Fixtures ===
28 October 2026 (N)
Scorecard

Eastern; 198/6 (20 ov)	v	Lions; 204/1 (18 ov)

Lions won by 9 wickets
The Wanderers Stadium, Johannesburg

- Lions won the toss and elected to field

28 October 2026 (N)
Scorecard

South Western Districts; 158/7 (18.3 ov)	v	Titans; 157/6 (20 ov)

South Western Districts won by 3 wickets
Recreation Ground, Banstead

== Knockout stage ==
=== Bracket ===
Semi-finals
1
4
2
3

Final
SF1W
SF2W

=== Semi-finals ===
Semi-final 1
13 November 2026
14:00

v

Semi-final 2
13 November 2026
18:00 (N)

v

=== Final ===
Final
14 November 2026
13:00 (N)

v

== Statistics ==
As of 11 October 2026

Most runs
Runs	Player	Team
238	Joshua van Heerden	Western Province
215	Lhuan-dre Pretorius	Titans
184	Gavin Kaplan	Boland
164	Grant Roelofsen	Dolphins
152	Sinethemba Qeshile	Titans

Most wickets
Wickets	Player	Team
8	Prenelan Subrayen	Dolphins
7	Thomas Kaber	Warriors
7	Tshepo Moreki	Western Province
6	Leo Sadler	Western Province
6	George Linde	Western Province

== See also ==
- 2026–27 Pro50 Cup
- 2026–27 Pro50 Shield
- 2026–27 1st Class Series
- 2026–27 1st Class Shield
- 2026–27 CSA Women Pro20 Series
- 2026–27 CSA Women Pro20 Series
