= 2026–27 1st Class Shield =

Cricket tournament in South Africa

- Dates: 10 September 2026 – 8 April 2027
- Administrator: Cricket South Africa
- Cricket format: First-class
- Tournament format: Single round-robin
- Participants: 7
- Matches: 43

The 2026–27 1st Class Shield is a first-class cricket competition scheduled to take place in South Africa from 10 September 2026 to 8 April 2027. The competition forms part of Cricket South Africa's revamped domestic cricket structure for the 2026–27 season.

== Teams ==
Team	Primary home ground	Captain	Coach
Border	Buffalo Park Cricket Stadium, East London		Rowan Richards
Easterns	Willowmoore Park, Benoni		Tumelo Bodibe
Tuskers	Pietermaritzburg Oval, Pietermaritzburg	Cameron Shekleton	Ahmed Amla
Limpopo	Polokwane Cricket Club, Polokwane		Gurshwin Rabie
Mpumalanga	Uplands College, White River		Mbasa Gqadushe
Northern Cape	Kimberley Oval, Kimberley	Tshepo Ntuli	Gordon Parsons
South Western Districts	Recreation Ground, Oudtshoorn		Letlotle Sesele

== Fixtures ==
In August 2026, Cricket South Africa confirmed the fixtures for the tournament as a part of the 2026–27 South African domestic cricket season.

10–12 September 2026

Border	v	Easterns

Buffalo Park, East London

10–12 September 2026

Tuskers	v	Limpopo

Pietermaritzburg Oval, Pietermaritzburg

10–12 September 2026

Mpumalanga	v	Northern Cape

Uplands College, White River

== Standings ==
=== Points table ===
Pos	Team	Pld	W	L	D	Pts	Qualification
1	Border	0	0	0	0	0	Advanced to the Final
2	Eastern Storm	0	0	0	0	0	Advanced to the Final
3	KwaZulu-Natal Inland	0	0	0	0	0	
4	Limpopo	0	0	0	0	0	
5	Mpumalanga	0	0	0	0	0	
6	Northern Cape	0	0	0	0	0	
7	South Western Districts	0	0	0	0	0	

Updated to match(es) played on 29 September 2026. Source: Cricinfo
Rules for classification: Points system: 16 for a win, 8 for a tie, 6 for a draw.
- Batting bonus points: in the first innings only, 1 point for reaching 150 runs, then 0.02 points for each run thereafter.
- Bowling bonus points: in the first innings only, 1 point for taking three wickets, then 1 point for each two wickets thereafter.

== Final ==
8–11 April 2027
Scorecard

TBA	v	TBA

SuperSport Park, Centurion

== See also ==
- 2026–27 Pro20 Cup
- 2026–27 Pro50 Shield
- 2026–27 Pro50 Cup
- 2026–27 1st Class Series
- 2026–27 CSA Women Pro20 Series
- 2026–27 CSA Women Pro20 Series
