= Pro20 Cup =

South African cricket tournament

- Countries: South Africa
- Administrator: Cricket South Africa
- Format: Twenty20
- First edition: 2026–27
- Next edition: 2027–28
- Tournament format: Group stage and knockout
- Number of teams: 16
- Current champion: Warriors
- Most successful: –
- Most runs: Lhuan-dre Pretorius (463)
- Most wickets: Beuran Hendricks (17)
- TV: SuperSport; YouTube (worldwide)
- 2026–27 Pro20 Cup

The Pro20 Cup is a professional Twenty20 Cricket competition in South Africa, organized by Cricket South Africa (CSA). Launched in 2026, it serves as the successor to the CSA T20 Challenge and CSA T20 Knock-Out competitions were merged and rebranded as the Pro20 Cup.

The competition forms part of Cricket South Africa's revamped domestic cricket structure for the 2026–27 season.

== History ==
The Pro20 Cup was introduced for the 2026–27 season as part of Cricket South Africa's restructuring of domestic cricket. The competition was created through the merger of the T20 Challenge and T20 Knockout competitions, replacing the CSA T20 Challenge as South Africa's premier men's domestic Twenty20 competition.

The new competition brought teams from the previous domestic T20 structure together under a single tournament. The Tournament sponsored by YesPlay.

== Format ==
In August 2026, the CSA announced a new format for the tournament. The 16 teams will be divided into two groups of eight each. In the group stage, each team will play each of the other teams in the group once in a round-robin format. The top four teams in each group will advance to the Super 8 stage.

The Super 8 stage consists of eight qualified teams, divided into two groups of four teams each. Each team carries forward its results, points and net run rate from the group-stage matches played against the other three teams that qualified from the same group. These matches count towards each team's Super 8 standings, even though they are not played again during this stage.

Teams then play four matches against the four qualifying teams from the opposite group. The points and net run rate earned in these matches are added to the carried-forward figures to determine the final Super 8 standings. The top two teams from each group advance to the semi-finals.

Pool A	Pool B
Dafabet Boland; Easterns Storm; Flexbrands Knights; South Africa Emerging Players; Momentum Multiply Titans; Mpumalanga Rhinos; Tuskers; YesPlay Cobras	Dafabet Warriors; DP World Lions; Eastern Cape Iinyathi; Hollywoodbets Dolphins; Garden Route Badgers; Northern Cape Heat; North West Dragons; Wenbro Impalas

== Team ==
=== Division One ===
Team	Province	Home Ground(s)	Coach	Captain
Boland	Western Cape	Boland Park, Paarl		
Dolphins	KwaZulu-Natal	Kingsmead, Durban		
DP World Lions	Gauteng	Wanderers Stadium, Johannesburg		
Knights	Free State	Mangaung Oval, Bloemfontein		
North West Dragons	North West	JB Marks Oval, Potchefstroom		
Titans	Gauteng	SuperSport Park, Centurion		
Warriors	Eastern Cape	St George's Park, Gqeberha		
Western Province	Western Cape	Newlands, Cape Town		

=== Division Two ===
Team	Province	Home Ground(s)	Coach	Captain
Border	Eastern Cape	Buffalo Park, East London		
Easterns	Gauteng	Willowmoore Park, Benoni		
KwaZulu-Natal Inland	KwaZulu-Natal	City Oval, Pietermaritzburg		
Limpopo	Limpopo	Polokwane Cricket Club, Polokwane		
Mpumalanga	Mpumalanga	Uplands College, White River		
Northern Cape	Northern Cape	De Beers Diamond Oval, Kimberley		
South Western Districts	Western Cape	Recreation Ground, Oudtshoorn		

== Tournament results ==
Year	Final				Player of the series	Ref.
Year	Date & Venue	Winner	Result	Runner-up	Player of the series	Ref.
2026–27	14 November 2026; Newlands Cricket Ground, Cape Town	Warriors	Warriors won by 36 runs	Lions		

== Team performances ==
Seasons Teams	2026–27
Boland	SF
Dolphins
Knights
Lions	RU
North West
Titans
Warriors	C
Cobras	SF
Border
Easterns Storm
Tuskers
Limpopo
Mpumalanga
Northern Cape
South Western Districts
South Africa Emerging Players

- C: Champions
- RU: Runner-up
- Team qualified for the semi-final of the competition

== Records and statistics ==
Pro20 Cup records
Batting
Most runs		
Highest score	Lhuan-dre Pretorius	188*
Highest partnership		
Most runs in a tournament		
Bowling
Most wickets		
Best bowling figures	Chad Laycock	6/26 (4)
Most wickets in a tournament		
Fielding
Most dismissals (wicket-keeper)		
Most catches (fielder)		
Team
Highest team total		
Lowest team total		
Source:Cricinfo

As of 3 October 2026
