= 2026–27 Pro50 Shield =

Cricket tournament

- Dates: 13 September 2026 – 3 April 2027
- Administrator: Cricket South Africa
- Cricket format: List A
- Tournament format(s): Round-robin and knockout
- Host: South Africa
- Participants: 7
- Matches: 43

The 2026–27 Pro50 Shield (also known for sponsorship reasons as the Dafabet Pro50 Shield) is the inaugural season of the Pro50 Shield, the List A cricket tournament organised by Cricket South Africa in South Africa. The tournament took place from 13 September 2026 to 3 April 2027.

The competition forms part of Cricket South Africa's revamped domestic cricket structure for the 2026–27 season.

== Teams ==
Team	Location	Province
South Western Districts	Recreation Ground, Oudtshoorn	Western Cape
KwaZulu-Natal (Inland)	City Oval, Pietermaritzburg	KwaZulu-Natal
Northern Cape	De Beers Diamond Oval, Kimberley	Northern Cape
Limpopo	Polokwane Cricket Club, Polokwane	Limpopo
Easterns	Willowmoore Park, Benoni	Gauteng
Mpumalanga	Landau Recreation Club, Witbank	Mpumalanga
Border	Buffalo Park, East London	Eastern Cape

== Fixtures ==
In August 2026, the Cricket South Africa confirmed the fixtures for the tournament as a part of the 2026–27 South African domestic cricket season.

13 September 2026
13:00
Scorecard

v

13 September 2026
13:00
Scorecard

v

13 September 2026
13:00
Scorecard

v

== Standing ==
=== Points table ===
Pos	Team	Pld	W	L	T	NR	Pts	NRR	Qualification
1	Easterns	2	2	0	0	0	8	0.380	Advanced to the Final
2	Limpopo	2	1	1	0	0	4	−0.509	Advanced to the Final
3	South Western Districts	2	1	1	0	0	5	—	
4	Mpumalanga	2	1	1	0	0	4	−1.406	
5	Northern Cape	1	0	0	0	1	2	0.000	
6	Knights	1	0	1	0	0	0	−0.375	
7	Border	2	0	2	0	0	0	−0.400	

Updated to match(es) played on 29 September 2026. Source: Cricinfo

== Final ==
Final
29 March 2026
13:00 (D/N)
Scorecard

TBA	v	TBA

== See also ==
- 2026–27 Pro20 Cup
- 2026–27 Pro50 Cup
- 2026–27 1st Class Series
- 2026–27 1st Class Shield
- 2026–27 CSA Women Pro20 Series
- 2026–27 CSA Women Pro20 Series
