= 2026–27 1st Class Series =

Cricket tournament in South Africa

- Dates: September 2026 – May 2027
- Administrator: Cricket South Africa
- Cricket format: First-class
- Tournament format: Single round-robin
- Participants: 8
- Matches: 41

The 2026–27 1st Class Series was the inaugural season of the 1st Class Series, the premier first-class cricket competition in South Africa. It was the 120th edition of South Africa's first-class cricket competition, CSA revealed the season fixtures in August 2026 The season began in September 2026 and ends in May 2027.

The competition forms part of Cricket South Africa's revamped domestic cricket structure for the 2026–27 season.

== Teams ==
Team	Primary home ground	Captain	Coach
Boland	Boland Park, Paarl		
Dolphins	Kingsmead, Durban		
DP World Lions	Wanderers Stadium, Johannesburg		
Knights	Mangaung Oval, Bloemfontein		
North West Dragons	JB Marks Oval, Potchefstroom		
Titans	Centurion Park, Centurion, South Africa		
Warriors	St George's Park, Gqeberha		
Western Province	Newlands, Cape Town		

== Fixtures ==
In August 2026, the Cricket South Africa confirmed the fixtures for the tournament as a part of the 2026–27 South African domestic cricket season.

10–13 September 2026
Scorecard

Western Province	v	Warriors

Newlands, Cape Town

- Western Province won the toss elected to field.

10–13 September 2026
Scorecard

Knights	v	North West Dragons

Mangaung Oval, Bloemfontein

10–13 September 2026

Lions	v	Boland

Wanderers Stadium, Johannesburg

10–13 September 2026

Titans	v	Dolphins

SuperSport Park, Centurion

== Standings ==
=== Points table ===
Pos	Team	Pld	W	L	D	Pts
1	Lions	0	0	0	0	0
2	Warriors	0	0	0	0	0
3	Dolphins	0	0	0	0	0
4	Boland	0	0	0	0	0
5	North West	0	0	0	0	0
6	Western Province	0	0	0	0	0
7	Titans	0	0	0	0	0
8	Knights	0	0	0	0	0

Updated to match(es) played on 29 September 2026. Source: Cricinfo

== Final ==
26–30 April 2027

TBA	v	TBA

SuperSport Park, Centurion

== See also ==
- 2026–27 Pro20 Cup
- 2026–27 Pro50 Shield
- 2026–27 Pro50 Cup
- 2026–27 1st Class Shield
- 2026–27 CSA Women Pro20 Series
- 2026–27 CSA Women Pro20 Series
