= CSA Women Pro20 Series =

South African women's cricket competition

- Countries: South Africa
- Administrator: Cricket South Africa
- Format: Women's Twenty20
- First edition: 2024–25
- Latest edition: 2025–26
- Next edition: 2026–27
- Tournament format: Double round-robin and knockout
- Number of teams: 6
- Current champion: Western Province (2nd title)
- Most successful: Western Province (2 titles)
- 2026–27 CSA Women Pro20 Series

The CSA Women Pro20 Series, officially known as the Hollywoodbets Pro20 for sponsorship reasons, is a professional women's Twenty20 cricket competition in South Africa, run by the Cricket South Africa (CSA). Launched in 2024, it serves as the successor to the CSA Women's T20 Challenge.

== Teams ==
Team	Coach	Captain	Home Ground(s)	Province
Dolphins Women	Quinton Friend	Nondumiso Shangase	Kingsmead, Durban	KwaZulu-Natal
Free State			Mangaung Oval, Bloemfontein	Free State
Lions Women's	Shaun Pretorius	Raisibe Ntozakhe	Wanderers Stadium, Johannesburg	Gauteng
South Western Districts	Wynand de Ridder	Zintle Kula	Recreation Ground, Oudtshoorn	Western Cape
Titans Women		Anneke Bosch	Centurion Park, Centurion, South Africa	Gauteng
Western Province	Claire Terblanche	Leah Jones	Newlands, Cape Town	Western Cape

== Winners ==
Season	Winners	Runners-up	Ref
2024–25	Western Province (1)	Dolphins	
2025–26	Western Province (2)	Lions Women's	

== See also ==
- CSA Women Pro50 Series
