= Louis Koen =

Louis Koen is the name of:

- Louis Koen (cricketer) (born 1967), South African cricketer and former ODI national player
- Louis Koen (rugby union) (born 1975), South African rugby union player and past Springboks member
