= South Africa Academy cricket team in Pakistan in 2005–06 =

The South African Academy team toured Pakistan for cricket matches against the Pakistan Academy in August 2005. The Academy team was made up of players aged around 20, who are all with the South African National Cricket Academy as trainees. Only one - Jean-Paul Duminy - had any international experience from before, having toured Sri Lanka in 2004. The Pakistan Academy, meanwhile, consisted of a similarly young team, with one player having Test experience. There were two four-day matches and three one-day matches scheduled. The four-day matches did not have first class status, nor did the one-day matches have List A status. The Academy teams are not to be confused with A teams, which are second-tier teams, while these seem to have their focus on youth cricket. Pakistan Academy dominated the series, only losing the final match, when the one-day series was already decided. They won the four-day series 1–0 and the one-day series 2–1.

== Squads ==
- South Africa: Francois du Plessis (captain), Brendon Adams, Ryan Canning, Jandre Coetzee, Jean-Paul Duminy, Ugasen Govender, Morné Morkel, Francis Nkuna, Mario Olivier, Aaron Phangiso, Vernon Philander, Thandi Tshabalala, Kyle Smit, Vaughn van Jaarsveld, Myles Williamson.
- Pakistan: Hasan Raza (captain), Aamer Sajjad, Agha Sabir, Fahad Masood, Fawad Alam (OD only), Jannisar Khan, Khalid Latif, Khurram Manzoor, Mansoor Amjad, Mohammad Irshad, Najaf Shah, Nasir Jamshed, Rizwan Akbar (OD only), Shahid Yousuf, Tahir Khan, Tariq Mahmood, Yasir Ali, Zulqarnain Haider

== Match details ==
=== First 4-day match, Pakistan Academy v South Africa Academy (11–13 August) ===
Pakistan Academy won by nine wickets

After the first two days at National Stadium were closely fought, the tourists imploded to hand Pakistan the victory and a 1–0 lead in the 2-match series. It had started well for South Africa, which Myles Williamson - without any first-class experience - making 31, while Thandi Tshabalala and Jean-Paul Duminy made fifties. At 174 for 3, South Africa looked confident, but Pakistan fought back. Yasir Ali ripped through the lower order with six wickets, all caught behind, lbw or bowled, as South Africa were all out for 248, Duminy left stranded on 82 not out. South Africa's fielding effort started well, with Ugasen Govender taking three wickets as Pakistan crawled to 84 for 5, but thanks to 19-year-old Zulqarnain Haider, who made 76, the innings was turned around. South Africa still led by 12 after the first innings, which was completed eight overs into day three, but Yasir continued with his good bowling, and wicket-keeper Zulqarnain held four catches as South Africa crawled to 118 - Vaughn van Jaarsveld the only batsman to pass 20 with his 46. Pakistan were set 131 to win, and did it with ease, Shahid Yousuf scoring 83 not out as they passed the target with nine wickets to spare. Cricketarchive scorecard

=== Second 4-day match, Pakistan Academy v South Africa Academy (18–21 August) ===
Match drawn

Despite declaring twice in an attempt to get a result, the South African team was very nearly beaten in this match at Gaddafi Stadium. Having won the toss and chosen to bat, they immediately lost two wickets to their tormentor, Yasir Ali, and at 121 for 5 things looked grim. However, Jean-Paul Duminy played what is possibly his highest innings of his career, flaying the Pakistani bowlers for an incredible 265 not out - well supported by Ryan Canning, who notched up 112 runs before captain Francois du Plessis declared. With the total 470 for 5 - the partnership having added 349 runs together - South Africa managed to dig into the Pakistani batsmen at regular intervals on day three, and despite 85 from Shahid Yousuf they could only post 303. Ugasen Govender and Vernon Philander both got figures of three wickets for 43. In reply, South Africa made hay quickly, scoring 162 for 5 in 34 overs and giving themselves plenty of time to bowl Pakistan out - setting them what was thought to be a challenging target of 330. However, despite four wickets from Morné Morkel, Shahid Yousuf and Hasan Raza made centuries, and when the final over of the day was bowled, the hosts needed 13 runs to complete the whitewash and win the series 2-0. They could only make six - however, they still took the series, with 1-0 in two Tests. Cricketarchive scorecard

=== First 1-day match, Pakistan Academy v South Africa Academy (24 August) ===
Pakistan Academy won by 84 runs

Pakistan Academy continued their good run, winning the first of three one-day games. In these games, 12 players could be named, but only 11 could bat, meaning that a team could choose to pick one player to only bowl. Hasan Raza, coming off an unbeaten century in the four-day game, continued to impress, hitting a well-paced 70 as Pakistan Academy made their way to 244 for 8. The South African reply was stopped dead by pacer Mohammad Irshad, who took six for 21 as the South Africans collapsed to 160. Irshad's first two wickets were number two Coetzee and number three Smit, both bowled for 0 and 2 respectively. Cricketarchive scorecard

=== Second 1-day match, Pakistan Academy v South Africa Academy (26 August) ===
Pakistan Academy won by 39 runs

Pakistan Academy secured the series with a 39-run win at the Gaddafi Stadium, going up 2–0 in the three-game series. Having been put in to bat by the South African captain, the Pakistani openers Agha Sabir and Khurram Manzoor added 140 for the first wicket. Despite three wickets from Mario Olivier, and two run outs, Pakistan still managed 280 before being bowled out nine balls short of the 50 over limit. South Africa got off to a poor start when Irshad had Williamson bowled for a two-ball duck in the first over, but Francois du Plessis and Ryan Canning put them back on track with a fine fifth-wicket partnership worth 80. When that partnership was broken, however, the tourists collapsed, ending on 241 all out. Cricketarchive scorecard

=== Third 1-day match, Pakistan Academy v South Africa (28 August) ===
South Africa Academy won by 4 runs (D/L method)

In a match reduced by rain, the South African Academy came back to record their first victory of the tour in the final game. Winning the toss and opting to bat at the Sheikhupura Stadium in Lahore, they lost Tshabalala early, but Williamson and Smit sent them back on track with a 61-run partnership. The middle and lower order then smacked the bowlers about, van Jaarsveld and Phangiso hitting three sixes between them in quickfire innings, as South Africa closed on 164 for 9. Mansoor Amjad took four wickets for Pakistan, but conceded 57 runs from five overs in the process. Due to rain having interrupted South Africa's innings, Pakistan were set 176 to win, and were in trouble early as Philander and Govender took wickets to peg them back to 12 for 3. Hasan Raza made another big innings, with 67 not out, but could not hit quickly enough as Pakistan fell five runs short of the target, ending on 171 for 5. Cricketarchive scorecard
