= 2025–26 CSA Women Pro20 Series =

South African women's domestic cricket season

- Dates: 5 October 2025 – 13 March 2026
- Administrator: Cricket South Africa
- Cricket format: Twenty20
- Tournament format(s): Round-robin and final
- Host: South Africa
- Champions: Western Province (2nd title)
- Runners-up: Lions Women
- Participants: 6
- Matches: 31
- Player of the series: Faye Tunnicliffe (Western Province)
- Most runs: Faye Tunnicliffe (422)
- Most wickets: N Vezi Kbw (15)

The 2025–26 CSA Women Pro20 Series was the second season of the CSA Women Pro20 Series, a professional Twenty20 cricket competition in South Africa. The tournament took place from 5 October 2025 to 13 March 2026.

The tournament ran alongside the 2025–26 CSA Women Pro50 Series.

== Format ==
The competition follows a double round-robin format, where each of the six provincial teams faces the others twice during the league stage. Points are distributed as follows:

- Win: 4 points
- Tie: 2 points
- No result/Abandoned: 2 points
- Loss: 0 points

The team with the most points at the end of the league stage advanced to the final. In case of a points tie, net run rate is used as a tiebreaker.

== Points table ==
Pos	Team	Pld	W	L	T	NR	BP	Pts	NRR	Qualification
1	Lions Women	10	8	1	0	1	5	39	0.911	Advance to final
2	Western Province	10	8	2	0	0	3	35	1.248	Advance to final
3	Titans Women	10	3	5	1	1	4	20	0.363	
4	Dolphins Women	10	4	6	0	0	2	18	−0.513	
5	North West	10	3	6	1	0	2	16	−1.006	
6	South Western Districts	10	2	8	0	0	0	8	−0.850	

Source: ESPNcricinfo

== Final ==
13 March 2026
18:00 (D/N)
Scorecard

Lions Women; 75/8 (20 overs)	v	Western Province; 76/6 (18.4 overs)
Jenna Evans 22 (39); Tatum le Roux 3/18 (4 overs)		Oluhle Siyo 24 (38); Raisibe Ntozakhe 4/9 (4 overs)

Western Province won by 4 wickets
Kingsmead Cricket Ground, Durban
Umpires: Y Godil and S Shabangu
Player of the match: Raisibe Ntozakhe (Lions)

- Western Province won the toss and elected to field.
