= Morné Morkel =

South African cricketer

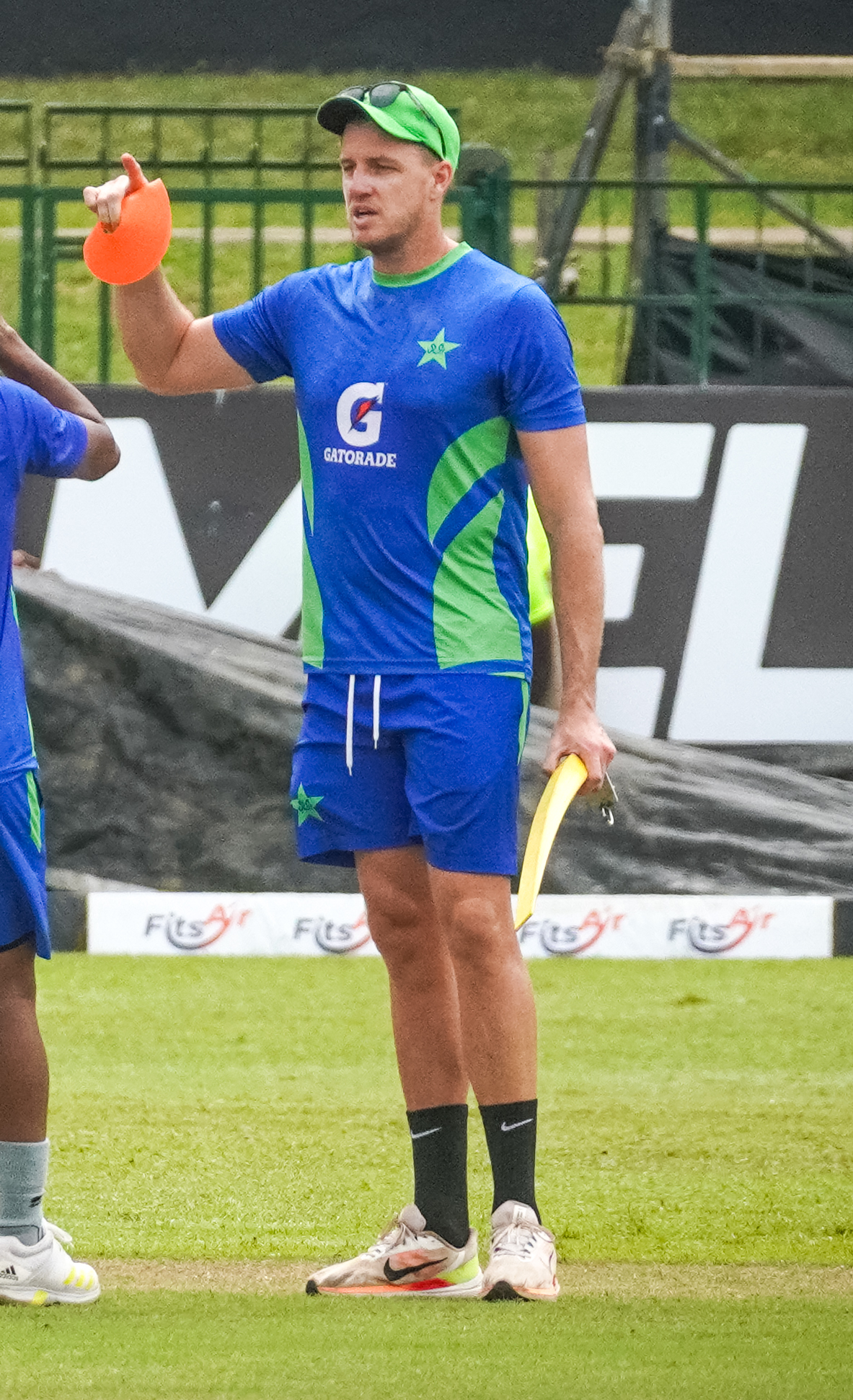
- Morkel in 2023

Personal information
- Full name: Morné Morkel
- Born: 6 October 1984 (age 42); Vereeniging, Transvaal, South Africa
- Height: 6 ft 5 in (1.96 m)
- Batting: Left-handed
- Bowling: Right-arm fast
- Role: Bowler
- Relatives: Albie Morkel (brother); Roz Kelly (wife)

International information
- National side: South Africa (2006–2018)
- Test debut (cap 300): 26 December 2006 v India
- Last Test: 30 March 2018 v Australia
- ODI debut (cap 89): 6 June 2007 v Asia XI
- Last ODI: 16 February 2018 v India
- ODI shirt no.: 65
- T20I debut (cap 28): 11 September 2007 v West Indies
- Last T20I: 15 September 2017 v Pakistan
- T20I shirt no.: 65

Domestic team information
- Years: Team
- 2003/04–2017/18: Easterns
- 2004/05–2017/18: Titans
- 2007: Kent
- 2008: Yorkshire
- 2009–2010: Rajasthan Royals
- 2011–2013: Delhi Daredevils
- 2014–2016: Kolkata Knight Riders
- 2016: St Lucia Zouks
- 2018–2020: Surrey (squad no. 64)
- 2019: Tshwane Spartans
- 2019/20: Perth Scorchers
- 2020/21: Brisbane Heat

Career statistics
Competition	Test	ODI	FC	LA
Matches	86	117	153	156
Runs scored	944	268	2,062	378
Batting average	11.65	9.24	13.13	9.45
100s/50s	0/0	0/0	0/4	0/0
Top score	40	32*	82*	35
Balls bowled	16,498	5,760	27,885	7,490
Wickets	309	188	566	239
Bowling average	27.66	25.32	25.46	25.71
5 wickets in innings	8	2	20	3
10 wickets in match	0	0	2	0
Best bowling	6/23	5/21	6/23	5/21
Catches/stumpings	25/–	31/–	51/–	41/–
- Source: ESPNcricinfo, 19 August 2020

Morné Morkel (Note: Morkel's forename, which is Afrikaner in origin, is spelled with an accented e. In common use this is often not used.) (born 6 October 1984) is a South African-born cricket coach and former cricketer. He played international cricket for South Africa national cricket team between 2006 and 2018. He briefly served as the bowling coach of the Pakistan national cricket team in 2023 and was the bowling coach of the Indian team which won the 2025 ICC Champions Trophy, 2025 Asia Cup and 2026 Men's T20 World Cup

Morkel made his Test match debut in 2006 and went on to play 86 Tests for the South African national cricket team. In March 2018, he became the fifth bowler to take 300 Test wickets for South Africa. He also played in 117 One Day Internationals and 44 Twenty20 International matches, making his debut in both formats in 2007.

On 26 February 2018, he announced that he would retire from all forms of international cricket at the end of the four-match Test series against Australia. Morkel played his last international game in March 2018 against Australia.

== Early career ==
Aged 19, Morkel began his first-class career with a match for Easterns against the touring West Indian cricket team in South Africa in 2003 and 2004. In this match his first class career began by delivering 17 no-balls in a five-over spell costing 54 runs against West Indies' batsmen Chris Gayle, Daren Ganga and Ramnaresh Sarwan. His first batting effort, however, was an unbeaten 44, which included a ninth-wicket stand of 141 with Albie as Easterns posted 313, trailing by 21. He claimed his first top-class wicket by dismissing Ramnaresh Sarwan, caught by Daryll Cullinan for 72.

Morkel played three further matches for Easterns in the 2003–04 season, which was Easterns' last in the SuperSport Series before South African domestic cricket was restructured. He continued to struggle with no-balls, bowling 41 in 71 completed overs. He took five wickets in the season, and Easterns won the SuperSport Series shield, for the teams knocked out of the main tournament.

== International career ==
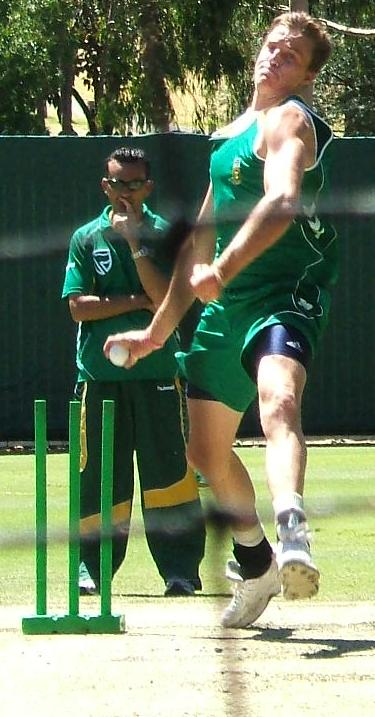
Morkel bowling in the Adelaide Oval nets, January 2009

Having taken six wickets in the one-run victory over Eagles in the SuperSport Series as well as scoring a century, and also having scored a half-century as the Titans set a target of 178, Morkel was called up to the Rest of South Africa team to face India two weeks later, thus missing the Titans' clash with Lions in the SuperSport Series. Morkel took four wickets, all of them in the first innings when India fell to 69 for five, and despite Alfonso Thomas' haul of seven for 56 in the second innings, it was Morkel who replaced Dale Steyn to make his Test debut three weeks later, on the 2006–07 Boxing Day Test in Durban against India.

He made his ODI debut playing for an Africa XI team against their Asian counterparts and took 3 wickets. In the following game he opened the bowling with his brother Albie and this was the first time in ODI history of two brothers doing so.

Morkel was then selected in the South African squad for the inaugural Twenty20 World Championship in South Africa, and went on to become one of the stars of the tournament, despite many feeling Twenty20 was a format with little scope for bowlers. Morkel bowled with consistent pace and accuracy, finishing with 9 wickets at 13.33 and an economy rate of 6.00, considered excellent in this form of the game. This haul included a match-winning spell of 4/17 against New Zealand, all wickets being caught behind or bowled, and he was denied his 5th wicket in his final over only due to an incorrect no-ball call when he had clean bowled the batsman. This would have been the first 5 wicket hall ever taken in international Twenty20 cricket. The host nation may have gone on to be eliminated from the tournament, but Morkel's bowling, along with the big hitting of his brother Albie, was unquestionably one of their biggest positives to emerge from the event. He was named as 12th man in the 'Team of the Tournament' by ESPNcricinfo for the 2007 T20I World Cup.

Morkel was subsequently selected for the tour of Pakistan, but suffered a broken bone in his foot in the warm up match preceding the first test. The injury was not too severe and Morkel picked up five crucial wickets as Pakistan collapsed to 248 all out.

In October 2012, alongside Dale Steyn and Vernon Philander, Morkel was part of a South African pace attack that bowling coach (and former Test cricketer) Allan Donald called the best the country had ever produced.

In August 2017, Morkel was named in a World XI team to play three Twenty20 International matches against Pakistan in the 2017 Independence Cup in Lahore.

During the third Test of the series against Australia in 2018, which was his last international series, Morkel became the fifth bowler for South Africa to take 300 wickets in Tests. He took two wickets in the last Test match and South Africa eventually won the match by a margin of 492 runs. The series was also won by South Africa, which was the first series win by South Africa against Australia on home soil since the series in 1969–70.

== Domestic career ==
In the 2004–05 season, Morkel played three more first class matches. Easterns, who had been placed in the second-tier UCB Provincial Cup and replaced by the franchise team Titans from Centurion, did not field Morkel for any of the first four games, but played him in their final game of the season against Border. In that Morkel took his first five-wicket-haul, though Border won by eight wickets after Easterns conceded 383 for nine and 108 for two. He also took nine wickets against the touring Zimbabweans, playing for a Combined XI of Easterns and Northerns, in which rain "rescued" the Zimbabweans from defeat. Morkel earned the call up to the first-tier Titans for the final game of the SuperSport Series season, and took three for 90 on the first day, which he improved to five for 122 before their opponents Western Province Boland declared. The Titans drew the match after following on, and Morkel ended the 2004–05 season with 20 first class wickets at a bowling average of 18.20. His no-ball ratio also improved, with 24 from 128.1 overs.

The 2006–07 season began with the renamed Standard Bank Cup, now known as the MTN Domestic Championship, where Morkel missed the first four games and instead played provincial cup cricket for Easterns. However, after the Titans had lost three successive games, Morkel replaced Pieter de Bruyn in the eleven, and conceded 17 runs from nine overs as the Titans successfully defended 213 in 45 overs against former internationals Murray Goodwin and HD Ackerman of the Warriors. With Morkel, the team won two and lost three games, but still finished last in the league stage and did not qualify for the semi-finals. However, no bowler in the MTN Championship with more than five wickets had a lower bowling average than Morkel's 19.

Morkel went on tour to Pakistan with South Africa Academy in August 2005, taking six wickets in two four-day matches, which did not have first class status. His wickets included four former Pakistani Under-19 players, all them batsmen or allrounders. He also went through without bowling a no-ball, but that problem returned when he played for the Titans in the International 20:20 Club Championship in Leicester, England in September. Morkel bowled two overs, with three no-balls and two wides, cost 41 runs, and the Titans lost by 67 after getting bowled out in 18 overs.

Morkel did not play in any of the first five first class games for the Titans in 2005–06, and also missed the first four Standard Bank Cup one-day games. However, after taking one for 24 from seven overs on one-day debut, where the team won by six wickets, he was retained for the remaining six games. He was responsible for one of ten four-wicket-hauls in the Standard Bank Cup that season, taking four for 41 as the Titans bowled out Cape Cobras for 189 to win by 19 runs and secured a top-two finish in the league stage. He took nine wickets at an average of 18.22 overall, but was dropped for Ethy Mbhalati in the semi-final, which the Titans won by ten wickets. He was then named in the initial eleven for the final, but he was subbed off for his brother Albie when the Titans were at 86 for six; the Titans lost by two wickets after Albie took three for 13. He was then given all six games for the Titans in Pro20, taking four wickets with an economy rate of 7.63 – largely increased by 60 runs in six overs in his last two matches, the last of which, the semi-final, had been shortened to a 7-over affair. He also played two first class matches in the SuperSport Series, contributing six wickets to the Titans' two victories, but was nevertheless dropped for the final three games and the final.

In September 2019, he was named in the squad for the Tshwane Spartans team for the 2019 Mzansi Super League tournament.

=== County cricket ===
Morkel has played in England for Kent County Cricket Club and began the 2008 season deputising for Rana Naved at Yorkshire. Rumours that he had been part of the second round of auctioning for the Indian Premier League, and signed a $60,000 contract with Rajasthan Royals, initially put Morkel's move to Yorkshire into doubt. However, Yorkshire were assured that he had not signed a contract to play in the IPL.

On his Yorkshire debut against Nottinghamshire, Morkel picked up a hamstring injury which meant his time with Yorkshire was cut short. He played in only one County Championship game for Yorkshire.

Following his retirement from international cricket, Morkel signed a two-year contract with Surrey as Kolpak registered player. However, in November 2020, Morkel ended his stay with Surrey, saying it was "no longer feasible" to spend prolonged periods of time away from his family due to the COVID-19 pandemic.

=== Indian Premier League ===
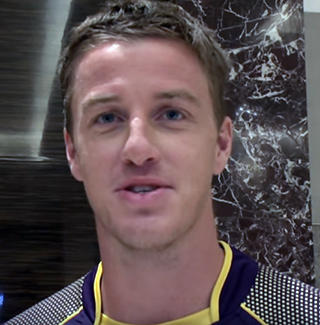
Morkel at the IPL in 2014

Morkel played for Rajasthan Royals in the first three seasons of the Indian Premier League. Playing for Delhi Daredevils in 2012, he took 25 wickets in 16 matches and was the leading wicket-taker in the league. He last played for Kolkata Knight Riders in the 2016 Indian Premier League.

== Playing style ==
Morkel played as a right-arm fast bowler and useful lower order left-handed batsman. Former South African fast bowler Allan Donald described him as having "genuine pace".

== Coaching career ==
After coaching with Lucknow Super Giants in the Indian Premier League, Morkel was the bowling coach of the Pakistan before, in 2024, he was appointed as the bowling coach of the Indian men's cricket team in August 2024.

== Personal life ==
Morkel hails from an Afrikaner family and is the youngest of three children of Albert and Mariana Morkel. He proposed to partner Roz Kelly, an Australian sports journalist in October 2013, and the couple got married in December 2014. They have two sons. His brother Albie Morkel is also a former international cricketer representing South Africa.

Morkel became a permanent resident of Australia on 6 November 2020, allowing him to compete in the Big Bash League as a local player.
