= William Henderson (cricketer) =

South African cricketer (1917–1995)

Personal information
- Full name: William Andrew Henderson
- Born: 19 November 1917; Pretoria, South Africa
- Died: 21 March 1995 (aged 77); Sandton, Gauteng, South Africa
- Batting: Right-handed
- Bowling: Right-arm fast

Domestic team information
- Years: Team
- 1937/38–1946/47: North Eastern Transvaal

Career statistics
Competition	First-class
Matches	10
Runs scored	98
Batting average	7.53
100s/50s	0/0
Top score	32
Balls bowled	2,274
Wickets	33
Bowling average	30.06
5 wickets in innings	1
10 wickets in match	0
Best bowling	7/4
Catches/stumpings	5/–
- Source: CricketArchive, 1 June 2018

William Andrew Henderson (19 November 1917 – 21 March 1995) was a South African cricketer who only played 10 first-class matches between 1937 and 1947.

== Five wickets in six balls ==
Henderson shares the record of taking five wickets in six balls in first-class cricket (W W W W 0 W, off the last 3 and first 3 balls of consecutive overs) with four other bowlers. He achieved this record for North Eastern Transvaal against Orange Free State at Bloemfontein in 1937–38.

North Eastern Transvaal won the toss and batted first, scoring 71 (Dudley Sparks took six for 21). In reply Orange Free State scored 94, Lennox Brown taking six for 55. In their second innings North Eastern Transvaal scored 414 for seven declared (Raymond Currer scored 150 and Robert Hicks 121). Requiring 392 to win, Orange Free State were dismissed for 46. Henderson took seven for 4, including four wickets in four balls and five wickets in six balls. His figures, bowling eight-ball overs, were 9.3–7–4–7. North Eastern Transvaal won by 345 runs. Henderson's five wickets finished the match; he bowled three of his victims in succession with full tosses.
