= 2011–12 Supersport Series =

- Dates: 29 September 2011 – 12 February 2012
- Administrator: Cricket South Africa
- Cricket format: First-class
- Tournament format: Double round-robin
- Champions: Titans (4th title)
- Participants: 6
- Matches: 30
- Most runs: Alviro Petersen (816)
- Most wickets: Simon Harmer (44)

The 2011–12 Supersport Series was a first-class cricket competition held in South Africa from 29 September 2011 to 12 February 2012. Titans won their fourth title (including one shared), after defeating Dolphins in the final round of matches. The victory margin in that match of an innings and 325 runs was a record in First-class cricket in South Africa.

== Points table ==
Teams	Pld	W	L	D	A	Pts
Titans	10	5	3	1	1	129.28
Cape Cobras	10	4	2	4	0	116.90
Knights	10	4	1	5	0	112.52
Lions	10	3	2	5	0	101.20
Warriors	10	2	7	0	1	81.80
Dolphins	10	1	4	5	0	72.50
