= 2013–14 Sunfoil Series =

- Dates: 21 November 2013 – 6 April 2014
- Administrator: Cricket South Africa
- Cricket format: First-class
- Tournament format: Double round-robin
- Champions: Cape Cobras (4th title)
- Participants: 6
- Matches: 30
- Most runs: Stiaan van Zyl (933)
- Most wickets: Dane Piedt (45)

The 2013–14 Sunfoil Series was a first-class cricket competition held in South Africa from 21 November 2013 to 6 April 2014. Cape Cobras retained their title, winning for the fourth time in total, after completing a victory in the final round against Lions by an innings and 165 runs.

== Points table ==
Teams	Pld	W	L	D	A	Pts
Cape Cobras	10	6	2	2	0	137.88
Knights	10	4	2	4	0	104.44
Dolphins	10	3	2	3	2	96.70
Titans	10	3	4	1	2	90.82
Warriors	10	2	4	4	0	79.72
Lions	10	2	6	2	0	79.64
