= 2026–27 CSA Women Pro50 Series =

South African women's domestic cricket season

- Dates: 4 October 2026 – 20 March 2027
- Administrator: Cricket South Africa
- Cricket format: List A cricket
- Tournament format(s): Round-robin and final
- Host: South Africa
- Participants: 6
- Matches: 31

The 2026–27 Hollywoodbets Pro50 was the second season of the CSA Women Pro50 Series, a professional List A cricket tournament that was played in South Africa. The tournament is scheduled to take place from 4 October 2026 to 20 March 2027.

The tournament will run alongside the 2026–27 CSA Women Pro20 Series as part of the Hollywoodbets Pro Series. The competition forms part of Cricket South Africa's revamped domestic cricket structure for the 2026–27 season.

== Points table ==
Pos	Team	Pld	W	L	T	NR	BP	Pts	NRR	Qualification
1	Dolphins Women	0	0	0	0	0	0	0	—	Advance to final
2	Lions Women	0	0	0	0	0	0	0	—	Advance to final
3	North West	0	0	0	0	0	0	0	—	
4	South Western Districts	0	0	0	0	0	0	0	—	
5	Titans Women	0	0	0	0	0	0	0	—	
6	Western Province	0	0	0	0	0	0	0	—	

First match(es) will be played: 4 October 2026. Source: Cricinfo
