= CSA Women Pro50 Series =

South African women's cricket competition

- Countries: South Africa
- Administrator: Cricket South Africa
- Format: 50-over cricket
- First edition: 2024–25
- Latest edition: 2025–26
- Next edition: 2026–27
- Tournament format: Double round-robin and knockout
- Number of teams: 6
- Current champion: Western Province (1st title)
- Most successful: Lions Women's; Western Province (1 title each)
- 2026–27 CSA Women Pro50 Series

The CSA Women Pro50 Series, officially known as the Hollywoodbets Pro50 for sponsorship reasons, is the main 50-over women's cricket competition in South Africa. It is run by the Cricket South Africa (CSA), and it serves as the successor to the CSA Women's One-Day Cup.

== History ==
The CSA Women Pro50 Series started in the 2024–25 season as South Africa’s official domestic women's 50-over cricket competition. Organized by Cricket South Africa, it replaced earlier CSA Women's One-Day Cup to provide a more professional and competitive structure. The series aims to develop local talent and prepare players for international cricket by offering regular high-level matches across six provincial teams.

== Teams ==
Team	Coach	Captain	Home Ground(s)	Province
Dolphins Women	Quinton Friend	Alexandra Candler	Kingsmead, Durban	KwaZulu-Natal
Free State			Mangaung Oval, Bloemfontein	Free State
Lions Women's	Shaun Pretorius	Kgomotso Rapoo	Wanderers Stadium, Johannesburg	Gauteng
South Western Districts	Wynand de Ridder	Zintle Kula	Recreation Ground, Oudtshoorn	Western Cape
Titans Women		Anneke Bosch	Centurion Park, Centurion, South Africa	Gauteng
Western Province	Claire Terblanche	Leah Jones	Newlands, Cape Town	Western Cape

== Format ==
Six provincial teams play each other once in a round-robin format, with points awarded for wins, ties, and no-results. The team with the most points at the end of the league is crowned champion

== Winners ==
Season	Winners	Runners-up	Ref
2024–25	Lions Women's (1)	Western Province	
2025–26	Western Province (1)	Lions Women's	

== See also ==
- CSA Women Pro20 Series
