= 2012–13 Sunfoil Series =

- Dates: 20 September 2012 – 10 February 2013
- Administrator: Cricket South Africa
- Cricket format: First-class
- Tournament format: Double round-robin
- Champions: Cape Cobras (3rd title)
- Participants: 6
- Matches: 30
- Most runs: Neil McKenzie (776)
- Most wickets: Kyle Abbott (49)

The 2012–13 Sunfoil Series was a first-class cricket competition held in South Africa from 20 September 2012 to 10 February 2013. Cape Cobras won their third title, during a 10 wicket victory in the final round against Knights.

== Points table ==
Teams	Pld	W	L	D	A	Pts
Cape Cobras	10	6	2	1	1	131.86
Lions	10	7	1	2	0	116.74
Dolphins	10	4	3	2	1	105.56
Warriors	10	4	4	1	1	100.00
Knights	10	2	2	3	3	88.16
Titans	10	0	8	2	0	46.68
