= 2025–26 CSA Women Pro50 Series =

South African women's domestic cricket season

- Dates: 4 October 2025 – 15 March 2026
- Administrator: Cricket South Africa
- Cricket format: List A cricket
- Tournament format(s): Round-robin and final
- Host: South Africa
- Champions: Western Province (1st title)
- Runners-up: Lions Women
- Participants: 6
- Matches: 31
- Player of the series: Nicolien Janse van Rensburg (South Western Districts)
- Most runs: Julia Hoal (342)
- Most wickets: Nicolien Janse van Rensburg (16)

The 2025–26 CSA Women Pro50 Series was the second season of the CSA Women Pro50 Series, a professional List A cricket tournament that was played in South Africa. The tournament started on 4 October 2025 and conclude on 15 March 2026.

The tournament ran alongside the 2025–26 CSA Women Pro20 Series.

== Points table ==
Pos	Team	Pld	W	L	T	NR	BP	Pts	NRR	Qualification
1	Lions Women	10	5	2	0	3	4	30	0.878	Advance to final
2	Western Province	10	5	4	0	1	4	26	0.790	Advance to final
3	Titans Women	10	5	3	0	2	2	26	0.138	
4	Dolphins Women	10	5	4	0	1	3	25	−0.037	
5	South Western Districts	10	4	6	0	0	2	18	−0.433	
6	North West	10	2	7	0	1	1	11	−1.046	

Source: ESPNcricinfo

== Final ==
15 March 2026
10:00
Scorecard

Lions Women; 99 (29.3 overs)	v	Western Province; 100/2 (24 overs)
Diara Ramlakan 41 (51); Delmi Tucker 3/18 (7.3 overs)		Faye Tunnicliffe 38* (57); Shabnim Ismail 2/34 (8 overs)

Western Province won by 8 wickets
Kingsmead Cricket Ground, Durban
Umpires: Muhammad Jooma and S Shabangu
Player of the match: Delmi Tucker (Western Province)

- Lions won the toss and elected to bat.
