= 2010–11 Supersport Series =

- Dates: 30 September 2010 – 3 April 2011
- Administrator: Cricket South Africa
- Cricket format: First-class
- Tournament format: Double round-robin
- Champions: Cape Cobras (2nd title)
- Participants: 6
- Matches: 30
- Most runs: Jacques Rudolph (954)
- Most wickets: Imran Tahir (42)

The 2010–11 Supersport Series was a first-class cricket competition held in South Africa from 30 September 2010 to 3 April 2011. Cape Cobras won their second title after defeating Warriors in the final round of matches by seven wickets.

== Points table ==
Teams	Pld	W	L	D	A	Pts
Cape Cobras	10	5	0	4	1	113.44
Titans	10	3	3	4	0	102.90
Lions	10	2	1	7	0	85.28
Dolphins	10	2	4	4	0	77.04
Knights	10	1	2	6	1	69.84
Warriors	10	1	4	5	0	60.28
