= 2009–10 Supersport Series =

- Dates: 17 September 2009 – 28 March 2010
- Administrator: Cricket South Africa
- Cricket format: First-class
- Tournament format: Double round-robin
- Champions: Cape Cobras (1st title)
- Participants: 6
- Matches: 30
- Most runs: Rilee Rossouw (1,189)
- Most wickets: Vernon Philander (45)

The 2009–10 Supersport Series was a first-class cricket competition held in South Africa from 17 September 2009 to 28 March 2010. Cape Cobras won the tournament for the first time, winning six of the ten matches and drawing three. On the opening day of the final round of matches, Eagles batsman Rilee Rossouw scored the fastest triple century in South African domestic cricket, reaching the mark in just 276 deliveries against the Titans.

== Points table ==
Teams	Pld	W	L	D	A	Pts
Cape Cobras	10	6	1	3	0	130.72
Titans	10	5	2	3	0	112.28
Lions	10	2	4	4	0	100.44
Eagles	10	2	4	4	0	86.44
Warriors	10	3	5	2	0	83.12
Dolphins	10	2	4	4	0	75.18
