= James Liddle =

South African cricketer

Personal information
- Full name: James Richard Liddle
- Born: 18 June 1930; Port Elizabeth, Cape Province, South Africa
- Died: 15 January 1959 (aged 28); Cape Town, Cape Province
- Batting: Left-handed
- Bowling: Slow left-arm orthodox

Domestic team information
- Years: Team
- 1949–50: Eastern Province
- 1950–51 to 1954–55: Orange Free State
- 1955–56 to 1956–57: Western Province

Career statistics
Competition	First-class
Matches	38
Runs scored	692
Batting average	14.41
100s/50s	0/2
Top score	77
Balls bowled	11,116
Wickets	181
Bowling average	23.50
5 wickets in innings	10
10 wickets in match	5
Best bowling	7/72
Catches/stumpings	16/0
- Source: CricketArchive, 17 August 2017

James Richard Liddle (18 June 1930 – 15 January 1959) was a South African cricketer who played first-class cricket from 1949 to 1956.

While at Grey High School in Port Elizabeth, Liddle played in the South African Schools team in 1946, 1947 and 1948. A left-arm spin bowler, he played three matches for Eastern Province in the 1949–50 season, taking nine wickets, including 3 for 97 when the Australians scored 418 on the opening day of their tour match.

In the 1951–52, now playing for Orange Free State, he took 40 wickets at an average of 16.65 and made 204 runs at 25.50. In the second match of the season he took 7 for 97 and 5 for 115 and made 31 and 77 against Rhodesia and in the last match he took 7 for 93 and 4 for 46 against Griqualand West. However, the more experienced Percy Mansell of Rhodesia, who made 571 runs at 43.92 and took 52 wickets at 17.63 and was also an experts slips fieldsman, was chosen ahead of Liddle as the second spin bowler for the tour to Australia and New Zealand in 1952–53.

In 1955–56 he moved to Western Province. He was their most successful bowler in their victory in the Currie Cup that season, taking 31 wickets in six matches at an average of 18.83. He took 7 for 72 and 3 for 64 against Transvaal at Cape Town in the first match, and 5 for 132 and 6 for 60, also at Cape Town, against Natal later in the season. He was one of the South African Cricket Annual Cricketers of the Year for 1956.

After a few matches in 1956–57 he succumbed to illness, and died in 1959 aged 28.
