= Richard Ryall =

South African cricketer (born 1959)

Personal information
- Full name: Richard James Ryall
- Born: 26 November 1959 (age 66); Harare, Zimbabwe
- Batting: Right-handed
- Role: Wicketkeeper

Domestic team information
- Years: Team
- 1979/80–1994/95: Western Province
- First-class debut: 21 November 1980 Western Province v Eastern Province
- Last First-class: 20 February 1995 Western Province v Orange Free State
- List A debut: 13 October 1979 Western Province v Griqualand West
- Last List A: 31 March 1995 Western Province v Orange Free State

Career statistics
Competition	First-class	List A
Matches	123	145
Runs scored	1613	350
Batting average	16.13	12.96
100s/50s	–/3	–/–
Top score	61	41*
Balls bowled	–	–
Wickets	–	–
Bowling average	–	–
5 wickets in innings	–	–
10 wickets in match	–	–
Best bowling	–	–
Catches/stumpings	384/38	189/11
- Source: CricketArchive, 7 November 2010

Richard James Ryall (born 26 November 1959 in Harare) is a former South African first class cricketer. He served as a wicketkeeper for Western Province for over a decade and took over 400 first class dismissals and 200 One Day dismissals.
