= Lions cricket team =

Lions cricket team may refer to:

- England Lions cricket team, England's "A" team
- Highveld Lions cricket team, South African domestic team
- Lahore Lions, Pakistani Twenty20 team
