= Bob Crisp =

South African cricketer (1911–1994)

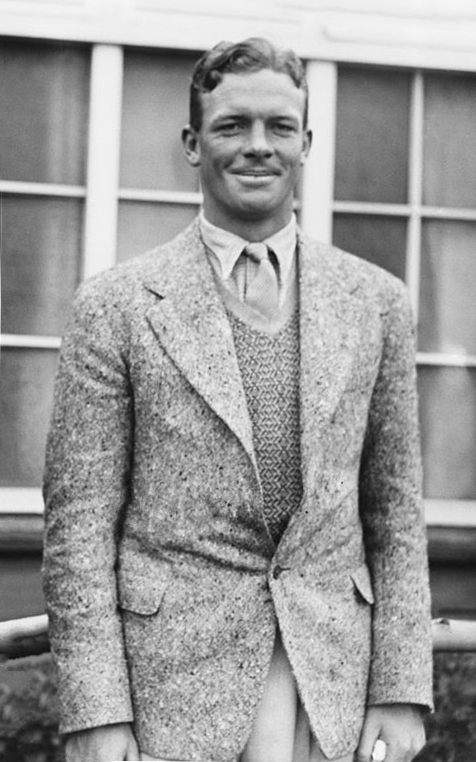
- Crisp in 1935

Personal information
- Full name: Robert James Crisp
- Born: 28 May 1911; Calcutta, Bengal, British India
- Died: 3 March 1994 (aged 82); Colchester, Essex, England
- Batting: Right-handed
- Bowling: Right-arm fast
- Role: Bowler

International information
- National side: South Africa
- Test debut: 15 June 1935 v England
- Last Test: 28 February 1936 v Australia

Domestic team information
- Years: Team
- 1929–1931: Rhodesia
- 1931–1936: Western Province
- 1938: Worcestershire

Career statistics
Competition	Test	FC
Matches	9	62
Runs scored	123	888
Batting average	10.25	13.05
100s/50s	0/0	0/0
Top score	35	45
Balls bowled	1,429	10,968
Wickets	20	276
Bowling average	37.35	19.88
5 wickets in innings	1	21
10 wickets in match	0	4
Best bowling	5/99	9/64
Catches/stumpings	3/–	27/–
- Source: Cricket Archive, 21 December 2009

Robert James Crisp DSO, MC (28 May 1911 – 3 March 1994) was a South African cricketer who played in nine Test matches between 1935 and 1936. He appeared for Rhodesia, Western Province, Worcestershire and South Africa. Though his Test bowling average lay over 37.00, Crisp had a successful first-class cricket career, with 276 wickets at 19.88. He is the only bowler in first-class cricket to have taken four wickets in four balls more than once.

He went on to a career in journalism and writing, publishing several accounts of his career in World War II and earning a reputation as an adventurer.

== Cricket career ==
=== Domestic debut ===
Crisp was born in Calcutta, Bengal in British India. He made sporadic appearances for Rhodesia between 1929 and 1931, taking only seven wickets before moving to Western Province for the 1931–32 season. He took 33 wickets that season at 14.93, including an eight-wicket haul against Griqualand West. He took three more five-wicket hauls in his 26 wicket-haul during the 1932–33 season, and scalped 27 more batsman in the 1933–34 season, including a career best 9/64 for Western Province.

=== England tour ===
Crisp toured England in 1935, taking 107 wickets in all at 19.58. He took 5/99 at Old Trafford for South Africa, to help earn his team their first victory in England. This was one of eight five-wicket hauls on the tour. Thirteen of those wickets came in his five Test matches, at 34.15. He returned to South Africa to take nine expensive wickets at 45.33 – seven of these in four Test matches against Australia before returning to England once more and taking a four-wicket haul in a first-class match that summer. He toured Ceylon and Malaya with Sir Julien Cahn's XI in the 1936–37 season, taking six wickets in the first-class match against Ceylon, before returning to England once more in 1938 to take 44 wickets for Worcestershire including a spell of 5/0.

== World War II and later life ==
Crisp served during World War II in the 3rd Royal Tank Regiment, later writing two books documenting his experiences: The Gods Were Neutral and Brazen Chariots, the latter of which is considered one of the classic memoirs of tank warfare. These books covered his combat during the early part of the war. The Gods Were Neutral describes the British retreat in Greece in the spring of 1941. Brazen Chariots covers the period from the summer of 1941 through Crisp's participation in Operation Crusader, up to his wounding. He was decorated for his bravery during the North African campaign and after being wounded there, nearly died several times from shrapnel in his skull as well as subsequent infection. Bernard Montgomery, commanding, intervened to restrict Crisp's decorations given the latter's disrespect for authority. Crisp ended the war with a Military Cross, Distinguished Service Order, and four "Mentioned in Dispatches".

Crisp was also noted for his womanising, "crooning in the nightclubs" of Alexandria and his wide-ranging travel – including climbing Mount Kilimanjaro (he is the only Test cricketer to have climbed it twice) and swimming Loch Lomond. He went on to a career as a journalist, writing for Wisden and several newspapers. He helped found Drum for black South Africans, sailed Greece, farmed minks in England and wrote for the East Anglian Daily Times.

During the 1970s, Crisp was diagnosed with cancer and responded by walking around Crete for a year, supporting himself by selling his account to the Sunday Express. He remained outspoken on apartheid, advocating "a federation of semi-autonomous states, black and white" and arguing that "nothing else is feasible". The end of segregation "startled" him. He lived to see South Africa reintegrated into the international Test scene before dying in 1994.

== Books ==
Crisp wrote a number of books, including:

- The Gods Were Neutral: A British Tank Officer's Very Personal Account of the Ill-Fated Greek Campaign in WWII, 1959 OCLC 5926883
- Brazen Chariots: An Account of Tank Warfare in the Western Desert, November–December 1941, 1959, WW Norton, New York OCLC 1295773740
- The Outlanders: The Men Who Made Johannesburg, 1964, OCLC 829366181
- Zen and the Art of Donkey Maintenance, 2015, Bloomsbury ISBN 978-1-4482-1523-2 compiled from his travel journalism serialised in the Daily Express in the 1960s and 1970s.
