= Stephen Steyn =

Scotland international rugby union player

- Born: Stephanus Sebastian Leonard Steyn; 10 November 1889 Moorreesburg, Cape Colony
- Died: 8 December 1917 (aged 28)
- School: Diocesan College
- University: University College, Oxford
- Occupation: Junior doctor

Rugby union career
Amateur team(s)
Years	Team	Apps	(Points)
- Oxford University RFC
International career
Years	Team	Apps	(Points)
1911-12	Scotland		

Lt. Stephanus Sebastian Leonard Steyn (10 November 1889 – 8 December 1917) was a Scottish-South African rugby union player and British Army officer who was killed in World War I.

Steyn was born in Moorreesburg, Cape Colony to Margaret Fraser Dobie Steyn of Dunbar and physician Gabriel Hendrik Steyn, who was a cousin of Martinus Theunis Steyn, President of the Orange Free State. Steyn was educated at Diocesan College, Rondebosch and University College, Oxford, where he studied medicine as a Rhodes scholar. He played for Oxford University RFC and was capped for Scotland in 1911–12. He was part of the Oxford team that won a surprise victory over South Africa, reportedly owing to Steyn and fellow South African Lennox Broster's knowledge of Afrikaans, which helped them understood everything the rival team was saying. He continued his medical training at Guy's Hospital in London.

He was killed on 8 December 1917, aged 28, while serving with the Royal Field Artillery. He is buried at the Jerusalem War Cemetery.
