= Noel Day =

South African cricketer (born 1953)

Personal information
- Full name: Noel Trevor Day
- Born: 31 December 1953 (age 72); Johannesburg, Transvaal
- Batting: Right-handed
- Role: Wicketkeeper

Domestic team information
- Years: Team
- Transvaal Province

Career statistics
Competition	First-class	List A
Matches	105	91
Runs scored	5081	1590
Batting average	30.42	24.46
100s/50s	7/31	–/8
Top score	174*	93*
Balls bowled	14	–
Wickets	0	–
Bowling average	–	–
5 wickets in innings	–	–
10 wickets in match	–	–
Best bowling	–	–
Catches/stumpings	312/29	107/9
- Source: cricinfo, February 15, 2016

Noel Trevor Day (born 31 December 1953 in Johannesburg, Transvaal) is a South African former first class cricketer. He served as a wicketkeeper for Northern Transvaal cricket team and Transvaal cricket team for over a decade and took over 340 first class dismissals and 116 One Day dismissals as well as 5081 runs in first-class at an average of 30.42 and 1590 runs at an average of 24.46 in List A.
