= Raisibe Ntozakhe =

South African cricketer

Personal information
- Full name: Annah Raisibe Ntozakhe
- Born: 29 November 1996 (age 29); Johannesburg, South Africa
- Height: 173 cm (5 ft 8 in)
- Batting: Right-handed
- Bowling: Right-arm off break
- Role: Bowler

International information
- National side: South Africa (2017–present)
- ODI debut (cap 80): 9 May 2017 v India
- Last ODI: 17 June 2022 v Ireland
- T20I debut (cap 45): 13 February 2018 v India
- Last T20I: 28 June 2018 v New Zealand

Domestic team information
- Years: Team
- 2010/11–present: Central Gauteng

Career statistics
Competition	WODI	WT20I
Matches	21	12
Runs scored	8	0
Batting average	2.00	–
100s/50s	0/0	0/0
Top score	3*	0*
Balls bowled	882	168
Wickets	16	3
Bowling average	35.93	75.66
5 wickets in innings	0	0
10 wickets in match	0	0
Best bowling	3/16	1/10
Catches/stumpings	4/–	1/–
- Source: ESPNcricinfo, 22 June 2022

Annah Raisibe Ntozakhe (born 29 November 1996) is a South African cricketer. She made her Women's One Day International (WODI) debut against India in the 2017 South Africa Quadrangular Series on 9 May 2017. She made her Women's Twenty20 International (WT20I) debut for South Africa Women against India on 13 February 2018.

In March 2018, she was one of fourteen players to be awarded a national contract by Cricket South Africa ahead of the 2018–19 season.

On 9 October 2018, she was named in South Africa's squad for the 2018 ICC Women's World Twenty20 tournament. However, later that same day the International Cricket Council (ICC) deemed her bowling action to be illegal. Therefore, she was immediately suspended from bowling in international matches. The following month, she was ruled out of the tournament and replaced by Yolani Fourie.

In September 2019, she was named in the F van der Merwe XI squad for the inaugural edition of the Women's T20 Super League in South Africa. On 23 July 2020, Ntozakhe was named in South Africa's 24-woman squad to begin training in Pretoria, ahead of their tour to England.

In February 2022, she was named as one of three reserves in South Africa's team for the 2022 Women's Cricket World Cup in New Zealand.
