= Louis Koen (cricketer) =

South African cricketer (born 1967)

Cricket information
- Batting: Right-handed
- Source: Cricinfo, 7 March 2006

Louis Johannes Koen (born 28 March 1967) is a former South African cricketer who played five One Day Internationals from 1997 to 2000. In February 2020, he was named in South Africa's squad for the Over-50s Cricket World Cup in South Africa. However, the tournament was cancelled during the third round of matches due to the coronavirus pandemic.
