= Mario Olivier =

South African cricketer (born 1982)

Personal information
- Full name: Mario Wickus Olivier
- Born: 3 November 1982 (age 44); Pretoria, South Africa
- Batting: Right-handed
- Bowling: Right-arm medium
- Role: Bowler

Domestic team information
- Years: Team
- 2010–2012: Northerns
- 2010: Titans
- 2004–2009: Warriors
- 2004: Boland

Career statistics
Competition	FC	List A	T20
Matches	35	14	5
Runs scored	382	31	12
Batting average	8.88	7.75	12.00
100s/50s	0/1	0/0	0/0
Top score	51	14*	11*
Balls bowled	4850	509	90
Wickets	95	27	4
Bowling average	32.22	20.22	28.50
5 wickets in innings	3	2	0
10 wickets in match	1	n/a	0
Best bowling	10/65	5/40	2/22
Catches/stumpings	5/0	1/0	0/–
- Source: cricinfo.com, 18 April 2008

Mario Wickus Olivier (born 3 November 1982 in Pretoria) is a South African cricketer who played first-class cricket from 2005 to 2012.

In December 2007 he became the third South African to take 10 wickets in a first-class innings when he took 10 for 65 for Warriors against Eagles. Eagles nevertheless won by 10 wickets, so Olivier took all their wickets that fell in the match. Five of his victims were out leg before wicket.
