= Lennox Brown =

South African cricketer (1910–1983)

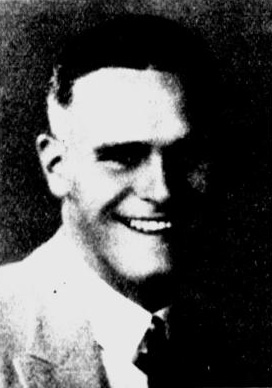
- Brown in 1931

Cricket information
- Batting: Right-handed
- Bowling: Right-arm fast-medium; Legbreak googly

International information
- National side: South Africa
- Test debut: 18 December 1931 v England
- Last Test: 4 March 1932 v New Zealand

Career statistics
Competition	Test	First-class
Matches	2	38
Runs scored	17	778
Batting average	5.66	16.91
100s/50s	0/0	0/3
Top score	8	75
Balls bowled	318	8,764
Wickets	3	147
Bowling average	63.00	24.77
5 wickets in innings	0	10
10 wickets in match	0	2
Best bowling	1/30	6/30
Catches/stumpings	0/–	27/–
- Source: CricketArchive, 15 November 2022

Lennox Sydney Brown (24 November 1910 – 1 September 1983) was a South African cricketer who played in two Tests in 1931–32.

Len Brown was a right-handed lower-order batsman and a right-arm fast-medium bowler who turned to bowling leg-breaks and googlies later in his career. His first-class cricket career began with two matches for Transvaal against the 1930–31 English touring team and he took seven wickets in his first match, including Wally Hammond and Percy Chapman twice each. He was then picked, as the youngest member of the team, for the 1931–32 tour to Australia and New Zealand. Brown was rarely part of the touring team's first eleven in the major matches, but after a bad showing in the first Test match, which was lost by an innings and 163 runs, he played in a non-first-class match against a New South Wales Country XI and, bowling throughout the Country XI's first innings, took five wickets for 57 runs, with another couple of wickets in the second innings. That led to his call-up to the Test team for the second match of the series. The result, though, was almost identical to the first game – defeat by an innings and 155 runs – and Brown took only one wicket at a cost of 100 runs. He also scored 2 and 8 in his two innings. He played in only a few of the other matches on the tour until the South Africans crossed to New Zealand where, in a less taxing series, he was recalled for the second Test match against the New Zealanders, the first game having been won by an innings. In this second (and last) Test of his career, Brown took a single wicket in each innings and scored 7 in the South Africans' only completed innings.

Brown played regularly for Transvaal in 1932–33 and the season included his best first-class bowling performance, six wickets for 30 runs in the match between Transvaal and a team representing the "Rest of South Africa". But he then left South African domestic cricket for three seasons and he was not selected for the 1935 tour to England. Instead, Brown played as a professional for Church in the Lancashire League for the 1935 and 1936 seasons. He returned to South Africa in 1936–37, playing for Transvaal in that season and in 1945–46, for North Eastern Transvaal from 1937 to 1940 and for Rhodesia from 1946 to 1948; he continued to take wickets and, after his stint in League cricket, his batting had improved, but he was not picked for any further representative matches.

He later worked as the sports editor for the Rhodesia Herald.
