= 2026–27 CSA Women Pro20 Series =

South African women's domestic cricket season

- Dates: 4 October 2026 – 20 March 2027
- Administrator: Cricket South Africa
- Cricket format: Twenty20
- Tournament format(s): Round-robin and final
- Host: South Africa
- Participants: 6
- Matches: 29

The 2026–27 Hollywoodbets Pro20 will be the third season of the CSA Women Pro20 Series, a professional Twenty20 cricket competition in South Africa. The tournament is scheduled to take place from 4 October 2026 to 20 March 2027.

The tournament will run alongside the 2026–27 CSA Women Pro50 Series as part of the Hollywoodbets Pro Series. The competition forms part of Cricket South Africa's revamped domestic cricket structure for the 2026–27 season.

== Format ==
The competition follows a double round-robin format, where each of the six provincial teams faces the others twice during the league stage. Points are distributed as follows:

- Win: 4 points
- Tie: 2 points
- No result/Abandoned: 2 points
- Loss: 0 points

The team with the most points at the end of the league stage advanced to the final. In case of a points tie, net run rate is used as a tiebreaker.

== Points table ==
Pos	Team	Pld	W	L	T	NR	BP	Pts	NRR	Qualification
1	Dolphins Women	0	0	0	0	0	0	0	—	Advance to final
2	Lions Women	0	0	0	0	0	0	0	—	Advance to final
3	North West	0	0	0	0	0	0	0	—	
4	South Western Districts	0	0	0	0	0	0	0	—	
5	Titans Women	0	0	0	0	0	0	0	—	
6	Western Province	0	0	0	0	0	0	0	—	

Updated to match(es) played on 17 October 2026. Source: Cricinfo

== Final ==
v
