= Polokwane Cricket Club Ground =

Cricket ground in Polokwane, South Africa

Coordinates: 23°55′16″S 29°27′29″E

- Location: Suid Street, Polokwane, Limpopo
- Country: South Africa
- Owner: Polokwane Local Municipality
- Tenants: Limpopo Impala Cricket
- As of 19 September 2025; Source: CricketArchive

The Polokwane Cricket Club Ground is a first-class cricket ground in Polokwane, the capital city of Limpopo in South Africa. It is the home ground and headquarters of the Limpopo cricket team, which competes in South Africa's national inter-provincial competitions.

Polokwane Cricket Club Ground is part of the extensive sports precinct on the southern fringe of Polokwane that includes Peter Mokaba Stadium, the Polokwane Golf Club, and facilities for many other sports including squash, athletics, ringball, rugby union, wrestling and bowls. The ground is also a popular venue for concerts and religious gatherings.

The ground, on Suid Street, has been the home ground for the Limpopo cricket team, men's and women's, since Limpopo returned to the top levels of inter-provincial cricket in the 2022–23 season. The women's team has played many of its games there since 2004–05. The ground hosted the final of the 2023–24 CSA T20 Knock-Out Competition, when Limpopo beat Northern Cape by six wickets.

== Records ==
At the end of the 2024–25 season, the ground's matches have included nine first-class matches and 29 women's List A matches. The highest individual first-class score is 163 by Hanu Viljoen of Northern Cape in 2023–24, and the best first-class bowling figures are 7 for 51 by Kieran Kenny of Mpumalanga in 2022–23.
