= City Oval =

Stadium in Pietermaritzburg, South Africa

Coordinates: 29°36′37.17″S 30°22′50.97″E

- Alexandra Park; Pietermaritzburg Oval
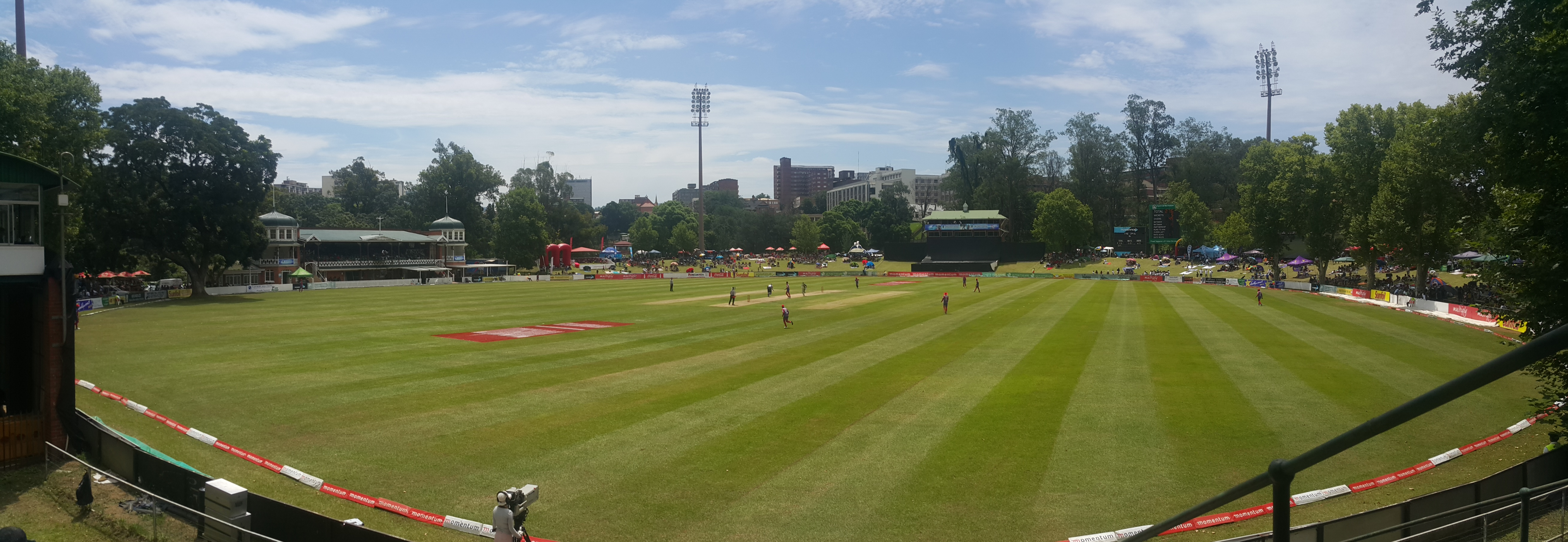
- Interactive map of City Oval

Ground information
- Location: Pietermaritzburg
- Country: South Africa
- Establishment: 1888
- Capacity: 12,000
- End names
- Duzi End; Hulett End

International information
- First men's ODI: 12 February 2003: Bangladesh v Sri Lanka
- Last men's ODI: 23 February 2003: India v Namibia
- Only women's ODI: 28 September 2023: South Africa v New Zealand
- First women's T20I: 18 May 2019: South Africa v Pakistan
- Last women's T20I: 19 May 2019: South Africa v Pakistan

Team information
KwaZulu-Natal
KwaZulu-Natal Inland
- As of 7 September 2020; Source: cricinfo

City Oval (formerly Alexandra Park and sometimes called the Pietermaritzburg Oval), is a multi-purpose stadium in Pietermaritzburg, South Africa. The 12,000 capacity stadium is currently used predominantly for cricket matches, with the ground being used by KwaZulu-Natal Inland men's and women's teams, KwaZulu-Natal and Dolphins (who also play at Kingsmead, Durban), and hosted two matches during the 2003 Cricket World Cup. It is one of only three first-class cricket grounds in the world to have a tree within the boundary ropes (the others being St Lawrence Ground in Canterbury, United Kingdom and VRA Cricket Ground in Amstelveen, Netherlands), and any cricketer that scores a century or takes a five-wicket haul in a match at the City Oval gets to plant a tree at the ground. The City Oval Pavilion is based on the design of Queen's Park cricket ground in Chesterfield, United Kingdom.

== History ==
The City Oval, then known as Alexandra Park, hosted its first first-class cricket match in 1894/95. Between 1895 and 1957, the City Oval hosted 9 first-class matches between Natal and Marylebone Cricket Club.

The ground has been used to host many matches between South African A sides and touring cricket teams. First class matches were also played between Natal and Australians touring team in 1950 and 1958. In 2000, the City Oval hosted a List A match between Bangladesh and the South African Board President's XI; Charl Langeveldt took 5/7 as Bangladesh were bowled out for 51, and lost the match by 10 wickets. South Africa A have additionally played List A matches at the City Oval against Australia A in 2002/03 and Sri Lanka A in 2008/09. In July 2015, City Oval hosted three youth ODIs between South Africa U-19 team and Bangladesh U-19 team; South Africa U-19 won 2 matches, and Bangladesh U-19 won one match.

In December 2015, the ground hosted a warmup match between South Africa A and England, which England won by an innings and 91 runs; Alastair Cook and Joe Root both hit centuries, and Moeen Ali took 6/77 in the second innings.

== 2003 Cricket World Cup ==
The City Oval has hosted two One Day International (ODI) matches, both of them in the 2003 Cricket World Cup.

Prior to the World Cup, the ground was renovated, with the introduction of the Jubilee Stand, named to commemorate Queen Victoria's diamond jubilee in 1897.

The first ODI at the ground was played between Bangladesh and Sri Lanka. In the first over of the match, Sri Lankan Chaminda Vaas took 4 wickets, including a hat-trick with the first three balls of the match, the first time this had occurred in international cricket. Vaas' wickets were Hannan Sarkar bowled off the first ball, Mohammed Ashraful caught and bowled off the second ball, Ehsanul Haque was caught by Mahela Jayawardene at slip off the third ball, and Sanwar Hossain off the fifth ball, making the score 5/4 from 1 over. He finished with figures of 6/25 from 9.1 overs with 2 maidens, as Sri Lanka beat Bangladesh by 10 wickets.

The second ODI was between India and Namibia; Indian batsmen Sachin Tendulkar and Sourav Ganguly scored a 244 run partnership for the second wicket, the seventh highest partnership at the Cricket World Cup as of 2016. Ganguly made 112 from 119 balls, and Tendulkar made 152 runs from 151 balls, his highest score in World Cup matches. India scored 311 runs, eventually winning the match by 181 runs. Tendulkar was awarded the man of the match award.

=== International centuries ===
Two ODI centuries have been scored at the venue.

No.	Score	Player	Team	Balls	Opposing team	Date	Result
1	152	Sachin Tendulkar	India	151	Namibia	23 February 2003	Won
2	112*	Saurav Ganguly	India	119	Namibia	23 February 2003	Won

=== Five-wicket hauls ===
There has been only one five-wicket haul at the venue.

No.	Bowler	Date	Team	Opposing team	Inn	Overs	Runs	Wkts	Econ	Result
1	Chaminda Vaas	14 February 2003	Sri Lanka	Bangladesh	1	9.1	25	6	2.72	Won
