= C. R. Deare =

South African cricket umpire

Charles Russel Deare (1852 - 4 October 1921) was a South African who umpired one Test match in South Africa.

Deare was born in Port Elizabeth in Cape Colony.

After umpiring a match between an eleven from Robert Warton's touring English side against a twenty-two from Port Elizabeth in January 1889, and a second match between eleven of the tourists and a fifteen from Eastern Province on 8, 9 and 11 March, he made his debut as a Test match in the 1st Test played between South Africa and England at St George's Park, Port Elizabeth, on 12 and 13 March 1889. This match between representative sides from England and South Africa was later accorded Test status, making it the first Test match played by South Africa. Deare stood with Robert Warton, whose Test umpiring career was limited to this Test and the 2nd Test at Cape Town two weeks later. However, Deare only umpired on the first day: he was replaced on the second day by Henry Webster.

The three-day match was played on a matting wicket. Play was dominated by England and the match was completed within 2 days. South Africa were bowled out for 84, with Johnny Briggs taking 4/39 and England captain Sir Aubrey Smith taking 5/19. Only Bernard Tancred (29) and South Africa captain Owen Dunell (26) (and extras) achieving double figures. England hit 148 in reply, with Bobby Abel scoring 46 after opening the batting, and Arnold Fothergill scoring 32 in a last-wicket stand of 45 with the Honourable Charles Coventry; Albert Rose-Innes took 5/43. South Africa reached 129 in their second innings, setting England a target of 66 to win, which was achieved with only 2 wickets down, with Abel 23 not out.

Deare died in Bournemouth in England.

== See also ==
- English cricket team in South Africa in 1888–89
- List of Test umpires
