= Robert Warton (umpire) =

English cricket umpire

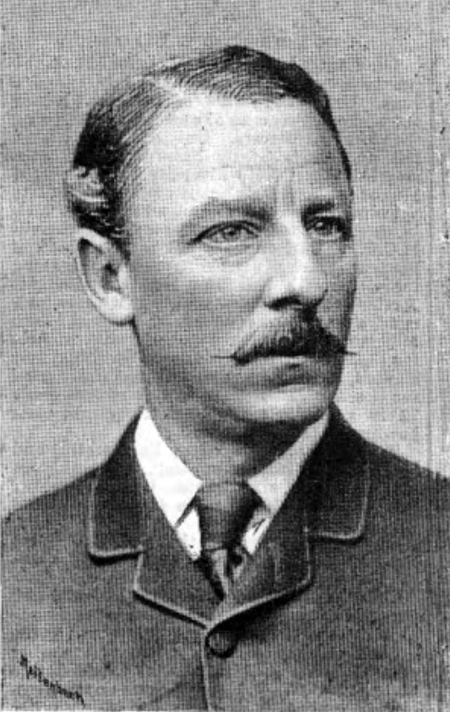
Major R. G. Warton in 1888

Lieutenant-Colonel Robert Gardner Warton (16 January 1847 – 20 September 1923) umpired two Test matches in South Africa in 1889.

Warton was born in Islington and educated at Highgate School. He served in the British Army in Japan and South Africa. He organised the first cricket tour by an English representative team to South Africa in 1888-89. The tour was run as a private venture, and the two matches he umpired which pitted the tourists against a South African side were only recognised as Test matches after the event.

Warton made his debut as a Test match umpire in the 1st Test played between South Africa and England at St George's Park, Port Elizabeth, on 12 and 13 March 1889. This match between representative sides from England and South Africa was later accorded Test status, making it the first Test match played by South Africa. Warton also stood in the 2nd Test between the representative sides, played at Newlands in Cape Town on 25 and 26 March, his final Test as an umpire. Warton stood in the 1st Test with C. R. Deare, whose Test umpiring career was limited to the first day of the 1st Test; he was replaced on the second day by Henry Webster. In the 2nd Test, Warton stood with first-class cricketer John Hickson. The 2nd Test was Hickson's only Test as an umpire.

The 1st Test and 2nd Tests were both scheduled as three-day matches, but play was dominated by England and both were completed within 2 days. Each was played on a matting wicket.

In the 1st Test, South Africa won the toss and batted first, but were bowled out for 84, with Johnny Briggs taking 4/39 and England captain Sir Aubrey Smith taking 5/19. Only Bernard Tancred (29) and South Africa captain Owen Dunell (26) (and extras) achieving double figures. England hit 148 in reply, with Bobby Abel scoring 46 after opening the batting, and Arnold Fothergill scoring 32 in a last-wicket stand of 45 with the Honourable Charles Coventry; Albert Rose-Innes took 5/43. South Africa reached 129 in their second innings, setting England a target of 66 to win, which was achieved with only 2 wickets down, with Abel 23 not out.

In the 2nd Test, England won the toss and batted first. Due to the indisposition of Smith, 23-year-old Monty Bowden became England's youngest Test captain, a record which still stands. Abel again opened the batting and was eventually out for 120, the first of his two Test centuries. England wicket-keeper Harry Wood added 59, and England were eventually bowled out for 292. The first day closed with South Africa on 2 for 1. The second day became a debacle for South Africa. Although Tancred became the first Test opener to carry his bat, scoring 26 not out, none of the ten other players reached double figures, adding only added 17 runs between them (plus 4 extras), and South Africa were bowled out for 47. Briggs took 7-17 (one lbw and six bowled). South Africa followed on but were again humiliated by Briggs in their second innings, and bowled out for 43. Briggs took 8-11 - a world record Test bowling analysis beaten by George Lohmann in February 1896 - all eight of whom were bowled - a record for the number of batsmen bowled by one bowler in a Test innings that remains unbroken. Only South Africa wicket-keeper Fred Smith managed double figures, bowled by Briggs for 11. England won by an innings and 202 runs. Briggs ended with match figures of 15-28, 14 of whom were bowled.

Warton spent 20 years in retirement in the Channel Islands, and died in Pontac in Jersey.

== See also ==
- List of Test umpires
- Warton, R. Gardner (1920). The Parish Churches of Jersey (for Societe Jersiaise). Beresford Library, Jersey.
