= John Hickson (cricketer) =

English cricketer and umpire

John Arnold Einem Hickson (22 December 1864 – 2 January 1945) was an English first-class cricketer and who umpired one Test match in South Africa in 1889.

Hickson was born in Hornsey. He played for twice for Kimberley and one for Cape Colony against RG Warton's XI in 1889, the first cricket tour by an English representative team to South Africa. The tour was run as a private venture, organised by Robert Warton.

Aged only 24, Hickson joined Warton to umpire the 2nd Test played between South Africa and England at Newlands in Cape Town on 25 and 26 March. This match between representative sides from England and South Africa was later accorded Test status, making it the second Test match played by South Africa. This was Hickson's only appearance as a Test umpire, and Warton's second and final match as a Test umpire, having umpired the 1st Test in Port Elizabeth two weeks earlier.

The 2nd Test was scheduled as a three-day match, played on a matting wicket. England dominated the match, and it was completed within 2 days. England won the toss and batted first. Due to the indisposition of Sir Aubrey Smith, 23-year-old Monty Bowden became England's youngest Test captain, a record which still stands. Bobby Abel opened the batting and was eventually out for 120, the first of his two Test centuries. England wicket-keeper Harry Wood added 59, and England were eventually bowled out for 292. The first day closed with South Africa on 2 for 1. The second day became a debacle for South Africa. Although Bernard Tancred became the first Test opening batsman to carry his bat, scoring 26 not out, none of the ten other players reached double figures, adding only added 17 runs between them (plus 4 extras), and South Africa were bowled out for 47. Johnny Briggs took 7-17 (one lbw and six bowled). South Africa followed on but were again humiliated by Briggs in their second innings, and bowled out for 43. Briggs took 8-11 – a world record Test bowling analysis beaten by George Lohmann in February 1896 – all eight of whom were bowled – a record for the number of batsmen bowled by one bowler in a Test innings that remains unbroken. Only South Africa wicket-keeper Fred Smith managed double figures, bowled by Briggs for 11. England won by an innings and 202 runs. Briggs ended with match figures of 15–28, 14 of whom were bowled.

Hickson played one first-class match Transvaal cricket team against Kimberley in the Currie Cup in April 1890, and was wicket-keeper for Middlesex in three matches, two in 1894 and one in 1896. He also played tennis in the gentlemen's doubles at Wimbledon, and was a scratch golf.

He died in Surbiton.

== See also ==
- List of Test umpires
