= English cricket team in South Africa in 1888–89 =

Cricket team that toured South Africa from December 1888 to March 1889

	South Africa	England
- Dates: December 1888 – 26 March 1889
Captains	OR Dunell	CA Smith

Test series
- Result: England won the 2-match series 2–0
Most runs	AB Tancred (87)	R Abel (189)
Most wickets	WH Ashley (7)	J Briggs (24)

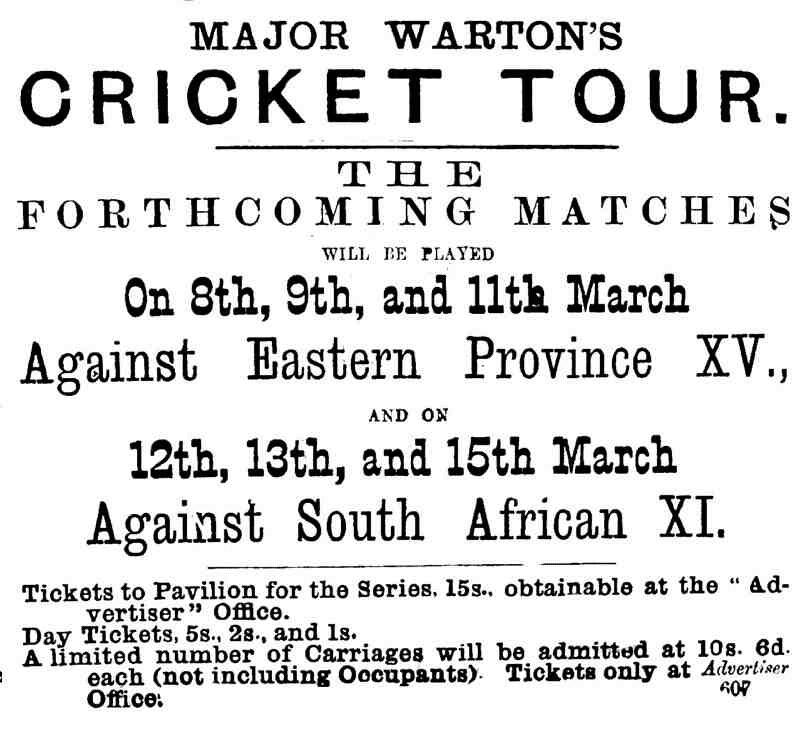
Advertisement for the First Test

An English cricket team managed by Major R. G. Warton toured South Africa from December 1888 to March 1889. Warton was a retired British Army officer who had served on the general staff in Cape Town and was a member of the Western Province Cricket Club. He had been invited by local enthusiasts to bring a team of English first-class cricketers to the country. He negotiated with local agents called Billy Simkins and William Milton, who obtained sponsorship from Sir Donald Currie, founder of the Castle Shipping Line. They made all the arrangements while Warton travelled to England and recruited players for the team which, at the time, was known as R. G. Warton's XI.

The team was captained by C. Aubrey Smith and included five players with prior international experience in Bobby Abel, Johnny Briggs, Maurice Read, George Ulyett and Harry Wood. Some of the other players, making up the numbers, did not have first-class status and Harry Altham described the team's standard as "about that of a weak county".

Two of their matches were against a team representative of all South Africa and, in 1897, it was officially decided that these should retrospectively be assigned Test match status. As such, the first is South Africa's inaugural Test and, given that there had been no first-class cricket in the country before 1889, it is the inaugural first-class match played in South Africa.

The term "test cricket" (in the sense of a test of team strength) was new in 1889 and was first used by Wisden Cricketers' Almanack in that year's edition. Allocation of retrospective status was bound to be controversial and, in Rowland Bowen's history, he argued that standards in South Africa were so poor that the two matches should not have been rated first-class, let alone Test. As he pointed out, South Africa's tour of England in 1894 was not first-class. Furthermore, when M. W. Luckin wrote the first history of South African cricket in 1914, he considered the 1889 matches to be minor.

== Tour summary ==
Warton's XI played a total of twenty matches but only the two retrospective Tests are recognised as first-class. This is because 17 of the games were played against odds, the home team in each case fielding from 15 to 22 players against eleven on the English team. Although the final match on the tour was 11-a-side against South Africa, it was a two-day filler (a first-class match must be scheduled for at least three days). Many of the matches were played on matting as, with rudimentary pitch preparation, surfaces were uneven; they tended to be grassy in coastal areas and hard soil in the interior.

Warton's XI met sides from four of the South African provinces: Eastern Province, Natal, Transvaal and Western Province. They also played teams representing the cities of Cape Town, Durban, Johannesburg, Kimberley, Pietermaritzburg and Port Elizabeth. Even playing against odds, the English team were expected to win all the provincial and city matches but they had four surprising defeats in their first six matches against Cape Town, Kimberley (twice) and Port Elizabeth. They nevertheless won the two Test matches convincingly.

The tour was successful in legacy terms as it brought South Africa into international cricket and provided a stimulus for their domestic game. Sir Donald Currie as sponsor was so impressed that he decided to donate the trophy named after him, the Currie Cup, as the prize for winning South Africa's domestic championship. For the 1888–89 season, the English team were asked to award it to the team which had excelled most against them. They chose Kimberley. In 1889–90, the competition proper began with a challenge by Transvaal to Kimberley. A shorter-term benefit for South Africa was that Frank Hearne decided to emigrate to the country, mainly for health reasons, and became a successful coach as well as representing South Africa in Test matches in the 1890s. Financially, the tour was not a success as it failed to make a profit and Wisden noted that "it was never intended, or considered necessary, to take out a representative English team for a first trip to the Cape".

== English squad ==
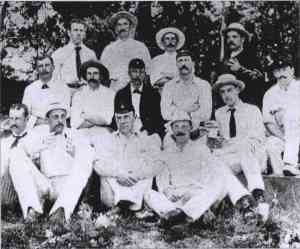
The English team at the start of the tour

Warton's XI consisted of fifteen players who were something of a mixed bag given that George Ulyett had already played in 22 Tests against Australia whereas, at the other extreme, six of the players were not registered with any county club. Bobby Abel, Johnny Briggs, Maurice Read and Harry Wood had played Test cricket against Australia. Monty Bowden, Arnold Fothergill, Frank Hearne and Aubrey Smith were established county players.

Cameron Skinner was a comedian who accompanied the party to provide entertainment but nevertheless took part in four of the odds matches. He never played in a first-class match. Neither did Major Warton himself; he played in the final (fill-up) match only on the tour. James Roberts, another occasional player, took part in the first odds match but then had to return home owing to the death of his father and Ulyett was contracted to replace him. Roberts made a single first-class appearance for Middlesex in 1892.

Charles Coventry, Basil Grieve and Emile McMaster all played against South Africa and so are officially credited as Test players despite never playing in any other first-class matches. Coventry was a career soldier who did play for Worcestershire, then a minor county, in 1886 and for some local or itinerant teams. Grieve and McMaster were former Harrow School pupils who both played for the school team in the 1870s. There is no record of McMaster ever playing for any other team except Warton's XI. In 1892, Grieve played in minor cricket for a team called the Ne'er-do-wells.

Squad details below state the player's age at the beginning of the tour, his batting hand, his type of bowling, and his County Championship team at the time:

Batsmen
Name	County	Birth date	Batting style	Bowling style	Ref
Bobby Abel	Surrey	30 November 1857 (aged 31)	right-handed	off break	
Monty Bowden	Surrey	1 November 1865 (aged 23)	right-handed	none	
Frank Hearne	Kent	23 November 1858 (aged 30)	right-handed	right arm fast roundarm	
Maurice Read	Surrey	9 February 1859 (aged 29)	right-handed	right arm fast-medium pace	

All-rounders
Name	County	Birth date	Batting style	Bowling style	Ref
George Ulyett	Yorkshire	21 October 1851 (aged 37)	right-handed	right arm fast	

Wicket-keepers
Name	County	Birth date	Batting style	Bowling style	Ref
Harry Wood	Surrey	14 December 1853 (aged 35)	right-handed	none	

Bowlers
Name	County	Birth date	Batting style	Bowling style	Ref
Johnny Briggs	Lancashire	3 October 1862 (aged 26)	right-handed	slow left arm orthodox spin	
Arnold Fothergill	Somerset	26 August 1854 (aged 34)	left-handed	left arm medium pace	
C. Aubrey Smith	Sussex	21 July 1863 (aged 25)	right-handed	right arm fast	

Other players
Name	County	Birth date	Batting style	Bowling style	Ref
Charles Coventry	none	26 February 1867 (aged 21)	right-handed	none	
Basil Grieve	none	28 May 1864 (aged 24)	right-handed	right arm fast	
Emile McMaster	none	16 March 1861 (aged 27)	right-handed	none	
James Roberts	none	1 July 1864 (aged 24)	left-handed	none	
Cameron Skinner	none	17 October 1863 (aged 25)	unrecorded	none	
Major R. G. Warton	none	16 January 1847 (aged 41)	unrecorded	none	

== South African selections ==
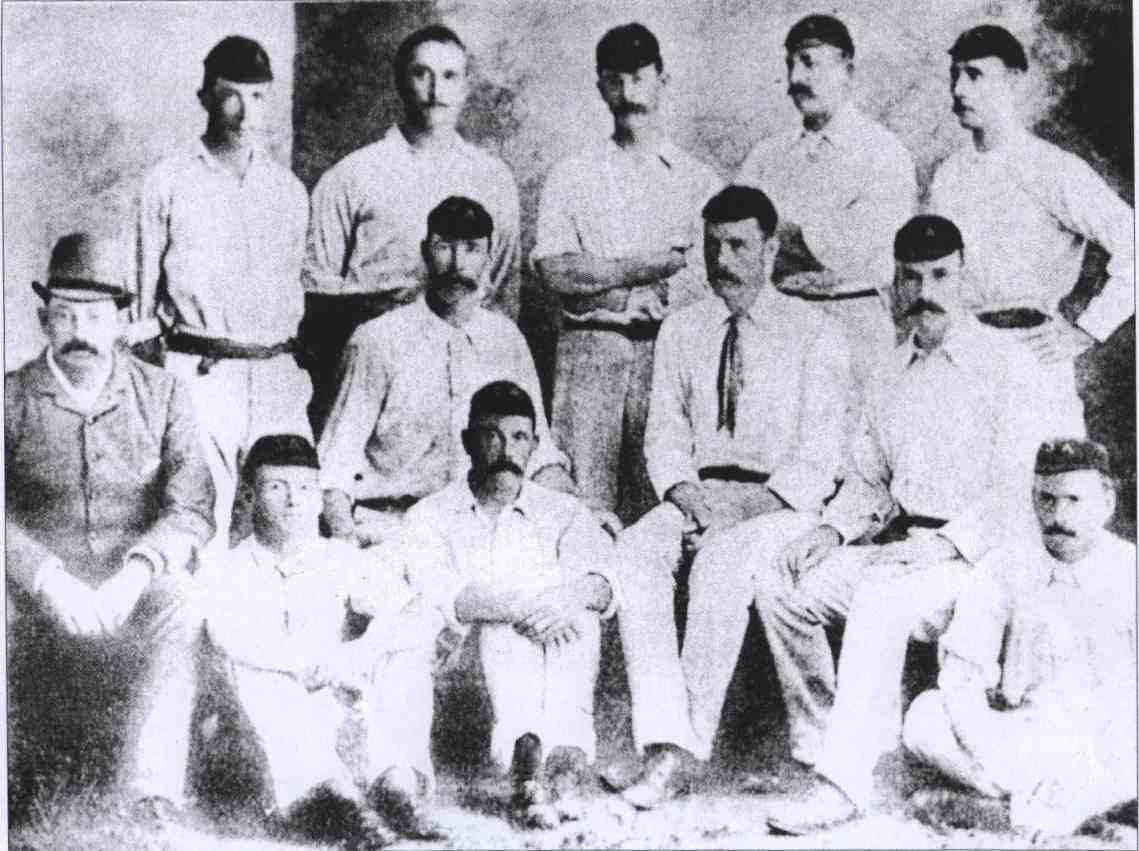
The South African team in the First Test

South Africa selected a total of fourteen players for the two matches, all of whom were making not only their Test match debuts but also their first-class debuts. Domestic first-class cricket began in South Africa in the 1889–90 season but none of these players went on to have extensive first-class careers.

The greatest number of first-class matches played was eleven by Bernard Tancred, who was a cousin of wicket-keeper Fred Smith. Gus Kempis played in five matches for Natal between 27 December 1889 and 9 January 1890, but he died in Mozambique four months later, aged 24.

Only three players (Milton, Smith and Vintcent) played for South Africa again after this season and they totalled three appearances each in their respective Test careers. Milton and Vintcent both played against England in 1891–92. Smith, who played against Lord Hawke's touring team in 1895–96 had the longest Test career span.

The details for each player below state his age at the beginning of the English tour, his batting hand, his type of bowling, and his provincial team at the time:

Batsmen
Name	Province	Birth date	Batting style	Bowling style	Ref
O. R. Dunell	Eastern Province	15 July 1856 (aged 32)	right-handed	none	
P. Hutchinson	Natal	25 January 1862 (aged 26)	right-handed	none	
A. E. Ochse	Transvaal	11 March 1870 (aged 18)	right-handed	none	
W. H. M. Richards	Western Province	26 March 1862 (aged 26)	right-handed	none	
R. B. Stewart	Eastern Province	3 September 1856 (aged 32)	right-handed	none	

All-rounders
Name	Province	Birth date	Batting style	Bowling style	Ref
C. E. Finlason	Transvaal	19 February 1860 (aged 28)	right-handed	off break	

Wicket-keepers
Name	Province	Birth date	Batting style	Bowling style	Ref
F. W. Smith	Transvaal	31 March 1861 (aged 27)	right-handed	none	

Bowlers
Name	Province	Birth date	Batting style	Bowling style	Ref
W. H. Ashley	Western Province	10 February 1862 (aged 26)	left-handed	left arm medium pace	
G. A. Kempis	Natal	4 August 1865 (aged 23)	right-handed	left arm medium pace	
W. H. Milton	Western Province	3 December 1854 (aged 34)	right-handed	right arm (style unrecorded)	
A. Rose-Innes	Transvaal	16 February 1868 (aged 20)	right-handed	slow left arm orthodox spin	
A. B. Tancred	Griqualand West	20 August 1865 (aged 23)	right-handed	right arm medium pace	
N. H. Theunissen	Western Province	4 May 1867 (aged 21)	right-handed	right arm fast	
C. H. Vintcent	Transvaal	2 September 1866 (aged 22)	left-handed	left arm medium fast pace	

== Test matches ==
=== First Test ===
At the time, the match was billed as Major Warton's XI versus a South African XI. It was retrospectively given Test match status and renamed South Africa v England. Played on a green matting wicket in Port Elizabeth, South African captain Owen Dunell won the toss against Aubrey Smith and chose to bat. The game did not last long as the matting wicket did not induce high scores. Around 3,000 spectators attended the first day's play. Wisden commented on a good all-round performance by the Englishmen with special mentions for Abel and Smith.

12–13 March 1889
(3-day match)
Scorecard
Wisden

South Africa	v	England
84 (75.2 overs); A. B. Tancred 29; O. R. Dunell 26*; C. A. Smith 5/19 (13.2 overs); J. Briggs 4/39 (37 overs)		148 (66.2 overs); R. Abel 46; A. Rose-Innes 5/43 (18 overs)
129 (90.1 overs); A. B. Tancred 29; A. J. Fothergill 4/19 (18.1 overs)		67/2 (21.1 overs); R. Abel 23*; G. Ulyett 22; C. Vintcent 1/21 (8.1 overs)

England won by 8 wickets
St George's Park, Port Elizabeth
Umpires: C. R. Deare (SA; day one) / Henry Webster (ENG; day two) and R. G. Warton (ENG)

- South Africa won the toss and decided to bat
- scheduled for three days, the match was played on green matting and finished just before 15:30 on the second day
- C. R. Deare stood as umpire on the first day and was replaced by Henry Webster on the second. All eleven South African and six English players made their Test debuts.

=== Second Test ===
Although South Africa was a very weak team, the performance by Johnny Briggs who took fifteen wickets for 28 runs in the match was exceptional. Abel made his third century of the tour. Bowden became England's youngest ever Test captain, aged 23 years 144 days. He replaced Smith who had developed a fever. Tancred became the first batsman to carry his bat in a Test match in scoring 26 not out. South Africa were obliged to follow on, but were again quickly dismissed. Briggs' second innings wickets were all bowled.

25–26 March 1889
(3-day match)
Scorecard
Wisden

England	v	South Africa
292 (123.1 overs); R. Abel 120; W. H. Ashley 7/95 (43.1 overs)		47 (47.1 overs); A. B. Tancred 26*; J. Briggs 7/17 (19.1 overs)
		43 (28.2 overs); F. W. Smith 11; J. Briggs 8/11 (14.2 overs)

England won by an innings and 202 runs
Newlands, Cape Town
Umpires: J. A. E. Hickson (ENG) and R. G. Warton (ENG)

- England won the toss and decided to bat
- scheduled for three days, the match was completed in two
- W. H. Ashley, W. H. M. Richards and N. H. Theunissen made their Test debuts for South Africa; J. E. P. McMaster made his Test debut for England
