= Arnold Fothergill =

English cricketer (1854–1932)

Personal information
- Full name: Arnold James Fothergill
- Born: 26 August 1854; Newcastle upon Tyne, Northumberland, England
- Died: 1 August 1932 (aged 77); Sunderland, County Durham, England
- Batting: Left-handed
- Bowling: Left-arm medium-fast

International information
- National side: England
- Test debut (cap 63): 12 March 1889 v South Africa
- Last Test: 25 March 1889 v South Africa

Domestic team information
- Years: Team
- 1880–1889: Somerset
- 1882–1892: MCC

Career statistics
Competition	Test	First-class
Matches	2	40
Runs scored	33	843
Batting average	16.50	14.05
100s/50s	0/0	0/1
Top score	32	74
Balls bowled	321	5,383
Wickets	8	119
Bowling average	11.25	18.18
5 wickets in innings	0	6
10 wickets in match	0	1
Best bowling	4/19	6/43
Catches/stumpings	0/–	15/–
- Source: CricketArchive, 1 October 2012

Arnold James Fothergill (26 August 1854 – 1 August 1932) was an English professional cricketer who played first-class cricket for Somerset County Cricket Club and the MCC in a career which spanned from 1870 until 1892. A left-arm fast-medium pace bowler, he appeared for England in two Test matches in 1889.

Fothergill began his career as a club professional in the north east of England. He joined Somerset as one of their first professionals in 1880, but was forced to miss most of 1881 while he qualified for the county. He was the most productive bowler for the county in their first two years of first-class cricket, but the emergence of E. W. Bastard, and later Ted Tyler and Sammy Woods, limited his opportunities with the club. He joined the ground staff at Lord's Cricket Ground in 1882, and played for the MCC until 1892, also appearing at Lord's for representative teams.

In the English winter of 1888–89, he was chosen to tour South Africa with the MCC, and played in two matches which were later designated as Test matches, though Wisden Cricketers' Almanack described them as being "arguably not even first-class." He took 119 first-class wickets during his career, of which eight came in his two Tests.

== Early life and career ==
Arnold James Fothergill was born on 26 August 1854 in Newcastle upon Tyne, Northumberland. He began his cricket career with Northumberland Cricket Club, a private club which was a precursor to the county team. He appeared as a professional for the team from 1870 until 1879, during which time he was also employed by Benwell High Cross Cricket Club in 1870 and 1871, and Manchester Cricket Club in 1879, before moving to Somerset in 1880.

== Somerset professional ==
=== Second-class cricket ===
Somerset County Cricket Club was founded in 1875, and although they initially struggled financially, Fothergill and Alfred Brooks were employed as the club's first professionals in 1880. Fothergill played his first recorded match for the county in July of that year, facing a team of sixteen men from Weston-super-Mare, taking thirteen wickets in the match. Throughout 1880, he was regularly Somerset's leading wicket-taker in their matches; he collected five wickets in an innings against the Marylebone Cricket Club twice, Hertfordshire, and Leicestershire. In 1881, Fothergill was included in the Somerset team to face Kent in Bath. The Kent captain, Richard Thornton objected to Fothergill's presence, correctly pointing out that he was not qualified to play for Somerset. As a result, Fothergill was removed from the team, and did not appear for the team in county cricket again that season, while he served his qualification. He did appear once for the county, against the MCC, taking four wickets in the first innings, and scoring 47 runs as an opening batsman.

=== First-class cricket ===
In 1882, Fothergill joined the ground staff at Lord's Cricket Ground, and made his first-class debut for the MCC against Derbyshire in May. Bowling unchanged in the first innings, he claimed five wickets for 31 runs, and then scored the highest score of his first-class career, 74 runs, in a large victory for his team. The following month, he featured for Somerset in what is generally considered to be their first match of the first-class cricket, against Lancashire. Somerset were heavily beaten in the match, during which Fothergill took three wickets and scored three runs. That summer, he was selected to appear for the professional "Players" against the amateur "Gentlemen" in the prestigious annual fixture at Lord's, in which he had little impact as the Gentlemen won by eight wickets. In all, Fothergill played fourteen first-class matches in 1882, claiming 44 wickets at an average of 22.02, and taking five wickets in an innings twice. He was Somerset's leading wicket-taker during the season, taking twice as many wickets as the next most effective bowler, Charles Winter.

Fothergill's first match in 1883 was in a representative match, (Note: A representative match in cricket means one in which one or both teams are composed of those regarded as representing the best players in a region or group (such as professional cricketers), or one involving national teams.) playing for the South against the North. (Note: This was a match in which a team of players from the northern English counties played against a team selected from the southern counties.) The South, for whom Fothergill was the only player to score double figures in each innings, lost the match. He then played exclusively with the MCC until the end of July, when Somerset's fixtures began. Having collected five wickets in an innings for the MCC against Oxford University, Fothergill repeated the feat twice that season for Somerset, taking five for 23 against Gloucestershire, and then achieving his best first-class bowling figures of six for 43 against Hampshire. In the latter match, he also took four wickets in the second innings, giving him ten wickets in the match, the only occasion he achieved the feat in first-class cricket. He played one further match towards the end of the 1883 season, against that year's "Champion County", Nottinghamshire. The MCC won the game by 121 runs; in the first innings, Fothergill was not required to bowl as Nottinghamshire were bowled out for 23, with six players scoring ducks, and he took five for 30 in the second innings. Fothergill was once more Somerset's leading wicket-taker during 1883, taking 27 of his 37 first-class wickets for the county that year. His bowling average of 14.72 was his best during an English season.

During the following season, Fothergill only appeared once for Somerset, in a match against Kent early in the season. He took four for 87 in the match, which was his final first-class appearance for the county. Fothergill was again selected to play for the South against the North, but bowled just three overs in the match, without taking a wicket. The remainder of his notable appearances that season were made for the MCC, though few were considered first-class. He performed well in matches against Wiltshire and Leicestershire, taking eleven wickets in each match, including seven for 62 in the second innings against Leicestershire, but neither match had first-class status. In 1885, he enjoyed his best match for the South, taking four wickets in each innings as the North were defeated by nine wickets. The majority of his cricket from 1884 until 1886 was made for the MCC, although he did appear four times in 1886 for Somerset, which had been stripped of its first-class status. In contrast, in 1887 and 1888, he played almost exclusively for the county, appearing just three times for the MCC. Somerset, who had relied on the bowling of Fothergill in the early 1880s, were spearheaded by E. W. Bastard, Ted Tyler and Sammy Woods in the late 1880s, and Fothergill was rarely needed to bowl many overs. Despite this, he was presented with a bat during 1888, a reward usually given to batsmen who had scored a century.

== Test cricketer ==
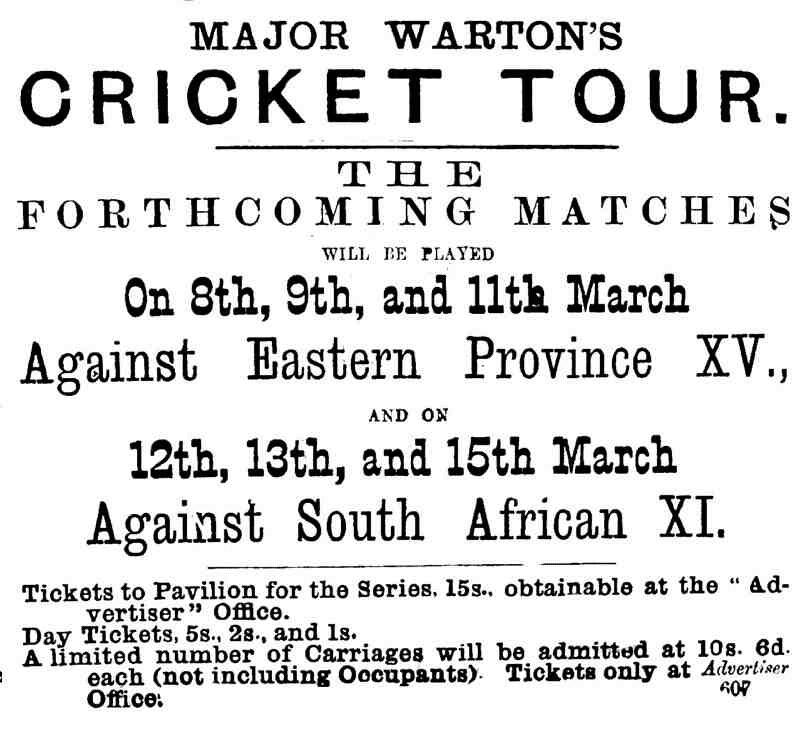
Advertisement for two matches on the tour, including the first Test.

During the English winter of 1888–89, the MCC sent a touring team to South Africa. Organised by Major Gardner Warton, the original itinerary only featured "odds" matches, in which an 11-player MCC team faced opposition teams including 15, 18 or 22 players, depending on their perceived strength. In his book, A History of Cricket, Harry Altham describes that the quality of the touring party "was about that of a weak county." Fothergill was selected as part of the team, despite not having played a first-class match since May 1887. The majority of the wickets during the tour were taken by Lancashire's spinner, Johnny Briggs, who took almost 300, but Fothergill was heavily used as a bowler, and claimed 119 wickets at an average of 6.89. Altham suggests that the ease of the touring team's victories justifies the selection of a comparatively weak team. As the tour continued, there were calls for an even-strength contest, with the English team facing an 11-player South African team. Two such matches were arranged, but were considered no different from the other matches during the tour, being advertised as Major Warton's XI v South Africa XI. The matches were later granted Test match status, although Wisden Cricketers' Almanack commented that, "it was never intended, or considered necessary, to take out a representative English team for a first trip to the Cape."

In the first Test, Fothergill opened the bowling with Briggs, and bowled economically, conceding 15 runs from his 24 four-ball overs. He only took one wicket in the innings, and was noted more for his batting later in the day. Having bowled South Africa out for 84, England rallied from 103 for nine due to a 45-run partnership for the tenth wicket between Fothergill and Basil Grieve. Batting at number eleven, Fothergill scored 32 runs, second only to opening batsman Bobby Abel. In South Africa's second innings, Fothergill was used as first-change bowler, (Note: A "first-change bowler" is the first bowler to replace one of the two bowlers who were bowling at the start of the innings.) and took four wickets for 19, his best figures in the two Test matches. South Africa scored 129 runs before being bowled out, and England scored the 67 runs required for victory with a day of the match remaining.

England dominated the second Test, largely due to the bowling of Briggs. Batting first, England scored 292 runs, of which Abel contributed 120. Fothergill claimed the first South African wicket, Albert Rose-Innes at the end of the first day, but only claimed two more in the match, as Briggs took fifteen wickets on the second day to help England to an innings and 202-run victory.

Fothergill's two Test appearances were the only ones of his career, and were also his final first-class matches. In all, he took 119 first-class wickets at an average of 18.18. His highest score was the 74 runs he scored on his debut.

== Later life and career ==
After returning from South Africa, Fothergill played occasionally for the MCC, and three further times for Somerset, but with little merit. He made his final appearance for Somerset in 1889, against Staffordshire; he took 157 wickets for the county in total, of which 57 came in first-class matches. His last match for the MCC was three years later, against Llandudno Cricket Club. In his obituary, Wisden suggest that he returned to Tyneside at the end of his professional cricket career. He died in Sunderland on 1 August 1932.

== Bibliography ==
- Roebuck, Peter (1991). From Sammy to Jimmy: The Official History of Somerset County Cricket Club (1991 ed.). London: Partridge Press. ISBN 1-85225-085-2.
- Foot, David. Sunshine, Sixes and Cider: The History of Somerset Cricket (1986 ed.). Newton Abbot, Devon: David & Charles. ISBN 0-7153-8890-8.
