= Robert Stewart (cricketer) =

Cricketer from South Africa (1856–1913)

Personal information
- Full name: Robert Burnard Stewart
- Born: 3 September 1856; Azamgarh, United Provinces, India
- Died: 12 September 1913 (aged 57); Cala, Cape Province, South Africa
- Batting: Right-handed

International information
- National side: South Africa
- Only Test (cap 9): 12 March 1889 v England

Career statistics
Competition	Test
Matches	1
Runs scored	13
Batting average	6.50
100s/50s	0/0
Top score	9
Catches/stumpings	2/–
- Source: Cricinfo, 13 November 2022

Robert Burnard Stewart (3 September 1856 – 12 September 1913) was a British and South African soldier and cricketer who played in South Africa's first Test match in 1889.

== Life and career ==
Stewart was born in Azamgarh, in the United Provinces of India, and educated at Wellington College in England, where he captained the First XI. He served as an officer with the British Army in South Africa from 1878.

Stewart and represented King William's Town, where he was stationed, in the Champion Bat Tournament. In the 1879–80 tournament he was the leading batsman; in the low-scoring final he scored a century and took seven wickets in King William's Town's innings victory over the team from Port Elizabeth. In the next Champion Bat Tournament, in 1884–85, he top-scored for King William's Town in all three matches.

When the English team toured South Africa in 1888–89 Stewart played against the tourists for Cape Colony, the Cape Mounted Rifles (two matches), and Eastern Province. He was one of the few local batsmen to reach double figures in these matches, although his highest score was only 25, which was also the top score in Eastern Province's first innings.

Stewart played in the Test match that followed a few days after the Eastern Province match. As it was the first match in South Africa to be considered first-class, he and his team-mates all made their first-class and Test debuts in the same match. For Stewart it was his only first-class match. He batted at number eight and made 4 and 9, and took two catches.

Stewart served with the Cape Mounted Riflemen in Basutoland in 1879 and 1880 and was awarded a medal with clasp, and later served in the Second Boer War, for which service he was awarded the Queen's South Africa Medal with four clasps and the King's South Africa Medal with two clasps. He was promoted to lieutenant in 1880, to captain in 1896, and brevet-major in 1901.
