= Vincent Tancred =

South African cricketer

Personal information
- Full name: Vincent Maximillian Tancred
- Born: 7 July 1875; Port Elizabeth, Cape Colony
- Died: 3 June 1904 (aged 28); Florida, Transvaal Colony
- Batting: Right-handed
- Role: Wicket-keeper
- Relatives: Bernard Tancred, Louis Tancred (brothers)

International information
- National side: South Africa
- Only Test (cap 44): 14 February 1899 v England

Career statistics
| Competition | Tests | First-class |
|---|---|---|
| Matches | 1 | 7 |
| Runs scored | 25 | 292 |
| Batting average | 12.50 | 24.33 |
| 100s/50s | 0/0 | 0/2 |
| Top score | 18 | 65 |
| Balls bowled | – | – |
| Wickets | – | – |
| Bowling average | – | – |
| 5 wickets in innings | – | – |
| 10 wickets in match | – | – |
| Best bowling | – | – |
| Catches/stumpings | 0/– | 4/– |
- Source: Cricinfo, 15 October 2019

Vincent Maximillian Tancred (7 July 1875 – 3 June 1904) was a cricketer who played in one Test in 1899.

Born into a cricketing family in Port Elizabeth, Cape Colony, Tancred, along with his brothers Bernard and Louis, showed cricketing talent from a young age and began playing for the Pretoria based Union Club while pursuing a legal career. Under the coaching of Albert Trott, Tancred developed into one of the best cricketers in the country, making his first-class debut on 7 March 1898 for Abe Bailey's Transvaal XI against Natal, scoring 57 and 4*. Tancred was second in the first-class batting averages for the 1897/98 season.

Tancred made his Test debut for South Africa at Johannesburg in the first Test of the 1898/99 series against England. Opening the batting, Tancred scored 18 and seven and was dropped for the second Test.

Tancred worked as secretary of the Pretoria Club until the commencement of the Anglo-Boer War in 1899, after which he enlisted in the South African Light Horse, serving as a lieutenant during the relief of Ladysmith, and was mentioned in despatches.

Following the war, Tancred gained work as a customs clearing agent and was keen to return to the South African side but, while playing for Transvaal against the touring 1902 Australian side, scored one and 0 and was left out of the ensuing Test series. Tancred still harboured hopes of making the 1904 touring side to England but when he was only listed as a reserve, he supposedly lapsed into depression.

Following an evening playing billiards with friends at a club in Johannesburg, Tancred borrowed a revolver and returned to the hotel in Roodepoort where he was staying. There, Tancred apparently shot himself in the head three times and was found unconscious by his brother Bernard, who had rushed to the hotel upon hearing of the revolver in Vincent's possession. Tancred died four hours later. A bachelor, he left no heirs.

Tancred's brother Louis, a member of the South African touring team to England, heard of Vincent's death and temporarily withdrew from the team before returning to the side to post some large scores in Vincent's memory.
