= History of cricket in South Africa to 1918 =

This article describes the history of South African cricket from its known beginnings until the end of the First World War in 1918.

Test and first-class cricket were both introduced retrospectively to South Africa in the 1888–89 season by the elevation in status of two matches played by an English touring team against a South African national team. At the same time, the Currie Cup was donated by Sir Donald Currie for the domestic championship and this was first contested in the 1889–90 season. Playing standards rose and a number of provincial teams were able to challenge for the championship, including Eastern Province, Griqualand West, Natal, Transvaal and Western Province. South Africa became increasingly involved in international cricket and the national team undertook six overseas tours (five to England and one to Australia) before 1914. Eight teams, seven English and one Australian, toured South Africa during the period.

== Beginnings ==
European colonisation of southern Africa began on Tuesday, 6 April 1652 when the Dutch East India Company established a settlement called the Cape Colony on Table Bay, near present-day Cape Town. Cape Colony slowly expanded along the coast and into the hinterland throughout the 17th and 18th centuries. It was founded as a victualling station for the Dutch East Indies trade route but soon became important in its own right due to its good farmland and mineral wealth.

There was no significant British interest in South Africa until the colony was seized by British forces in 1795 under General Sir James Craig during the French Revolutionary War, the Netherlands having fallen to France in the same year. British policy was to secure the colony against French encroachment in the name of the Dutch Stadtholder Willem V. Under the terms of the short-lived Treaty of Amiens in 1803, Cape Colony was handed back to the Netherlands, then known as the Batavian Republic. In 1806, with the Napoleonic Wars proper now under way, British forces again invaded and seized Cape Colony, this time with permanent designs on it. The whole territory was formally ceded to Great Britain in 1814 by the Anglo-Dutch Treaty of 1814 and administered as Cape Colony until it joined the Union of South Africa in 1910.

It is believed that cricket was introduced to South Africa by Craig's occupying force. A similar scenario had arisen throughout the British Empire. English soldiers and sailors were the pioneers of the game in numerous foreign lands. One of Craig's officers was Charles Anguish (sometimes known as Charles Clarke) who had been a member of the White Conduit Club and was an early member of Marylebone Cricket Club (MCC). Anguish had played in 32 first-class matches between 1788 and 1795 when he departed for the Cape. He died there in May 1797, by suicide.

It is generally supposed that Anguish organised matches in the colony but the earliest definite reference to cricket there is dated 1808, two years after the re-occupation. A newspaper called The Cape Town Gazette and African Advertiser carried notice that:

A grand match at cricket will be played for 1,000 dollars a side on Tuesday, January 5, 1808 between the officers of the artillery mess, having Colonel Austen of the 60th Regiment, and the officers of the Colony, with General Clavering. The wickets are to be pitched at 10 o'clock.

The venue for the 1808 match is unknown but there was another military match at Green Point in 1810 between the Ordnance and the 87th Regiment. There is a Green Point club, formed in the 1890s, but it is not certain if it is based at the same venue. If so, then it is the oldest known venue in South Africa.

== Early developments ==
Long before apartheid, cricket was considered "a white man's pastime" in South Africa but there is evidence of it being played by Bantus and Hottentots in 1854. Nevertheless, the surviving records are essentially about games played by whites only. H. Rider Haggard suggested that it became "an obsession" in the white military community and complained about officers insisting on taking cricket gear with them on the ill-fated Isandlwana mission in 1879.

By the middle of the 19th century, cricket had become well-established in Cape Town, Port Elizabeth and Pietermaritzburg. The first club known to have been formally constituted was in 1843 at Port Elizabeth, which then had a population of 3,000. The club was allocated some land just outside the town which it still uses as St George's Park. A club was founded in Cape Town in 1844 and in Pietermaritzburg by 1848. The military continued to be cricket's pioneer and staged a match at Bloemfontein, then only a small village, in 1850. There was a match in 1852 between clubs from Pietermaritzburg and Durban.

Cape Colony schools had adopted the game by the 1850s. Its growth in the hinterland was gradual and depended on settlers moving north from the Cape. A match was recorded in the Transvaal in 1861. In 1862, an annual fixture called "Mother Country v Colonial Born" was staged for the first time in Cape Town and became the most important match of the Cape season for many years. The game's popularity in Cape Town led to the foundation of Western Province Cricket Club in October 1864. In 1876, Port Elizabeth presented the "Champion Bat" for competition between South African towns; initially Cape Town, Grahamstown, Kingwilliamstown and Port Elizabeth itself. This competition was played sporadically until 1890 when, with provincial teams now involved, it was superseded by the Currie Cup.

== Beginning of first-class cricket ==
Two major venues opened in 1888: Newlands in Cape Town and the Old Wanderers in Johannesburg. At the end of the year, an English team arrived for the first overseas tour of South Africa. Known at the time as R. G. Warton's XI after its manager, the team played odds matches against several provincial and town teams. Then, in March 1889, it played two eleven-a-side matches against a South African XI. The first was at St George's Park, the second at Newlands. Warton's XI, captained by the future Hollywood actor C. Aubrey Smith, won both games comfortably; at Cape Town, Lancashire spinner Johnny Briggs had match figures of 15 for 28.

Retrospectively, these two matches were assigned first-class status, although the South African team was very weak and Warton's XI included some players who never otherwise played any first-class cricket. Then, after the concept of Test cricket had been established in the 1890s, it was officially decided in 1897 that the matches should be called South Africa versus England and so allocated Test status too. First-class cricket was itself officially defined by MCC and the leading English counties in December 1894. The first match at Port Elizabeth is, therefore, both the inaugural Test played by South Africa and the inaugural first-class match played in South Africa.

The tour was successful, although it did not achieve a financial profit, in that it introduced South Africa to international cricket and provided the domestic game with a huge stimulus. This was underwritten by tour sponsor Sir Donald Currie, founder of the Castle Shipping Line, who donated a trophy for the domestic champions. This was the Currie Cup, first awarded in 1889 to Kimberley.

== Start of domestic cricket (1889 to 1891) ==
Domestic first-class cricket began in December 1889 when Port Elizabeth Cricket Club hosted Natal at St George's Park, the visitors winning a low-scoring match by two wickets. Natal featured in all of the first five matches, which were played between 27 December and 9 January. Their team, on tour, went from Port Elizabeth to Kimberley where they played two matches against Kimberley at the Eclectics ground in Kimberley, the home team winning both. Natal then played two matches at Newlands against Western Province (won by one wicket) and Cape Town Clubs (lost by three wickets).

The Currie Cup was first contested at the end of the 1889–90 season when, as in boxing, a challenge was made to the holders. Transvaal challenged Kimberley and the match began on Saturday, 5 April at the Eclectics ground in Kimberley. Transvaal's captain C. Aubrey Smith and wicket-keeper Monty Bowden had played for Warton's XI the previous year (Bowden had emigrated to South Africa) and their experience gave Transvaal a distinct advantage, enabling them to win by six wickets.

Four first-class matches were played in the 1890–91 season. The first three were a round-robin between Eastern Province, Western Province and Griqualand West in the Champion Bat Tournament. Western Province were the winners after defeating both their rivals. It was the last Champion Bat Tournament as it was superseded by the Currie Cup thereafter. The fourth match was for the Currie Cup, still on a challenge footing. Former holders Kimberley challenged Transvaal and the match was played in April 1891 at the Old Wanderers in Johannesburg. It was into its seventh day before Kimberley won by 58 runs to reclaim the trophy. This was the last Currie Cup challenge match as the competition went national when next contested in the 1892–93 season.

== 1891 to 1902 ==
No domestic matches took place in 1891–92, when England was on tour. In 1892–93, Western Province won the Currie Cup after defeating both their rivals Transvaal by 91 runs and Griqualand West by 109 runs. In the other match, Transvaal beat Griqualand West by 8 wickets.

From then on, although it was not contested every season, the Currie Cup was the established national championship.

First-class cricket in South Africa was suspended during the Boer War from 1899 to 1902

== 1903 to 1918 ==
In 1903–04 the Currie Cup had a change in format from a qualifying round-robin followed by a final, for which the holders had already qualified, to a knock-out competition. This allowed for the competition to be held in more than one province. In 1904–05, the competition was expanded to allow for the inclusion of Rhodesia.

First-class cricket was suspended during the First World War from 1914 to 1919. Competition began again in the 1919–20 season.

== Currie Cup winners to 1914 ==
1. 1889–90 Transvaal
2. 1890–91 Kimberley (later called Griqualand West)
3. 1891–92 not contested due to England tour
4. 1892–93 Western Province
5. 1893–94 Western Province
6. 1894–95 Transvaal
7. 1895–96 not contested due to England tour
8. 1896–97 Western Province
9. 1897–98 Western Province
10. 1898–99 not contested due to England tour: first-class cricket in South Africa was suspended during the Boer War from 1899 to 1902
11. 1902–03 Transvaal
12. 1903–04 Transvaal
13. 1904–05 Transvaal
14. 1905–06 not contested due to England tour
15. 1906–07 Transvaal
16. 1907–08 not contested
17. 1908–09 Western Province
18. 1909–10 not contested due to England tour
19. 1910–11 Natal
20. 1911–12 not contested, evidently due to preparation of a team for the 1912 Triangular Tournament in England
21. 1912–13 Natal
22. 1913–14 not contested due to England tour: First-class cricket in South Africa was suspended during the First World War from 1914 to 1918

== International tours of South Africa to 1914 ==
=== England 1888–89 ===
- 1st Test at St George's Park Cricket Ground, Port Elizabeth – England won by 8 wickets
- 2nd Test at Newlands Cricket Ground, Cape Town – England won by an innings and 202 runs

=== England 1891–92 ===
- 1st Test at Newlands Cricket Ground, Cape Town – England won by an innings and 189 runs

South Africa won the toss and batted first. They were soon all out for 97, with John Ferris taking 6 for 54. In reply 134 from Henry Wood saw Walter Read's side total 369, a lead of 272 that South Africa were never likely to catch. Ferris's 7 for 37 helped dismiss the South Africans for 83 in their second innings.

The game is more interesting for some historical oddities:

- Billy Murdoch and Ferris, who had both previously played for Australia, played for England due to residence.
- Frank Hearne, who played for South Africa in this game, had previously played for England. Finally, the game gives the second instance of three brothers playing in the same Test match, as Frank Hearne's brothers, Alec Hearne and George Hearne played for England. A cousin, John Thomas Hearne also played for the tourists.
- The tour was simultaneous to the English cricket team in Australia in 1891–92, both teams deemed to have "Test status".

=== England 1895–96 ===
- 1st Test at St George's Park Cricket Ground, Port Elizabeth – England won by 288 runs
- 2nd Test at Old Wanderers, Johannesburg – England won by an innings and 197 runs
- 3rd Test at Newlands Cricket Ground, Cape Town – England won by an innings and 32 runs

=== England 1898–99 ===
- 1st Test at Old Wanderers, Johannesburg – England won by 32 runs
- 2nd Test at Newlands Cricket Ground, Cape Town – England won by 210 runs

=== Australia 1902–03 ===
- 1st Test at Old Wanderers, Johannesburg – match drawn
- 2nd Test at Old Wanderers, Johannesburg – Australia won by 159 runs
- 3rd Test at Newlands Cricket Ground, Cape Town – Australia won by 10 wickets

=== England 1905–06 ===
- 1st Test at Old Wanderers, Johannesburg – South Africa won by 1 wicket
- 2nd Test at Old Wanderers, Johannesburg – South Africa won by 9 wickets
- 3rd Test at Old Wanderers, Johannesburg – South Africa won by 243 runs
- 4th Test at Newlands Cricket Ground, Cape Town – England won by 4 wickets
- 5th Test at Newlands Cricket Ground, Cape Town – South Africa won by an innings and 16 runs

=== England 1909–10 ===
- 1st Test at Old Wanderers, Johannesburg – South Africa won by 19 runs
- 2nd Test at Lord's, Durban – South Africa won by 95 runs
- 3rd Test at Old Wanderers, Johannesburg – England won by 3 wickets
- 4th Test at Newlands Cricket Ground, Cape Town – South Africa won by 4 wickets
- 5th Test at Newlands Cricket Ground, Cape Town – England won by 9 wickets

This tour included The Reef v MCC at Boksburg. It was scheduled as a four-day match but play only took place on two because of bad weather. Although the two teams consisted of recognised players, the South African Board of Control decided as late as 1930 that it had not been a first-class match. Wisden 1931 reproduced a letter from the SABC which outlined its case. Wisden has ignored the ruling and includes the match in the career figures of all the players who took part, including record-breaking players such as Wilfred Rhodes, Jack Hobbs and Frank Woolley.

It is possible that the SABC thought it was a 2-day match, but Wisden 1911 clearly states that "not a ball could be bowled on the first and fourth days" so it was actually planned as a 4-day match. For more information about this curious affair, see Variations in published cricket statistics.

=== England 1913–14 ===
- 1st Test at Lord's, Durban – England won by an innings and 157 runs
- 2nd Test at Old Wanderers, Johannesburg – England won by aninnings and 12 runs
- 3rd Test at Old Wanderers, Johannesburg – England won by 91 runs
- 4th Test at Lord's, Durban – match drawn
- 5th Test at St George's Park Cricket Ground, Port Elizabeth – England won by 10 wickets

== Overseas tours by South Africa to 1914 ==
=== England 1894 ===
No Test matches were played and none of the South African team's matches are rated first-class.

=== England 1901 ===
Fifteen first-class and ten minor matches were played, but no Tests.

=== England 1904 ===
A total of 22 matches were played but no Tests.

=== England 1907 ===
- 1st Test at Lord's, London – match drawn
- 2nd Test at Headingley, Leeds – England won by 53 runs
- 3rd Test at The Oval, London – match drawn

=== Australia 1910–11 ===
- 1st Test at Sydney Cricket Ground – Australia won by an innings and 114 runs
- 2nd Test at Melbourne Cricket Ground – Australia won by 89 runs
- 3rd Test at Adelaide Oval – South Africa won by 38 runs
- 4th Test at Melbourne Cricket Ground – Australia won by 530 runs
- 5th Test at Sydney Cricket Ground – Australia won by 7 wickets

=== England 1912 ===
See 1912 Triangular Tournament.
