= Earl's Croome =

Village in Worcestershire, England

Coordinates: 52.078°N 2.191°W

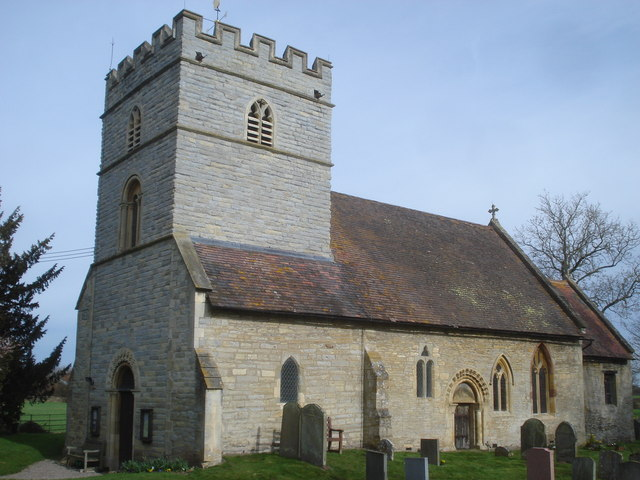
- St Nicholas Church

- Location within Worcestershire
- Population: 243 (2021)
- OS grid reference: SO870422
- Civil parish: Earl's Croome
- District: Malvern Hills
- Shire county: Worcestershire
- Region: West Midlands
- Country: England
- Sovereign state: United Kingdom
- Post town: Worcester
- Postcode district: WR8
- Police: West Mercia
- Fire: Hereford and Worcester
- Ambulance: West Midlands
- UK Parliament: West Worcestershire

Earl's Croome is a village and civil parish in the Malvern Hills District in the county of Worcestershire, England. The parish had a population of 243 in 2021.

== History ==
The village is mentioned in the Domesday Book of 1086 as Crube. The first part of its name is derived from the Earl of Coventry who had Earl's Croome Court as a residence, opposite the village church. The name Croome possibly derives from an old river or district name, perhaps deriving from the Old English crumb, or the Primitive Welsh crumm, both meaning 'crooked'. The church is St. Nicholas Church of England.

In 1377 or 1378, Henry de Ardern was granted the manor of Croome Adam (now Earl's Croome) by the Earl of Warwick for a red rose.

Charles Coventry (1867–1929), who played cricket for England in the first two Test matches they played against South Africa, is buried in the village cemetery. He commanded the Worcestershire Yeomanry during the First World War and was captured by the Turks at Katia in April 1916, spending the rest of the conflict as a prisoner of war.

For the 2000 millennial celebration a map was produced about the village history called "The Parish of Earl's Croome 2000". A book was also produced.
