= Philip Hutchinson =

South African cricketer

Personal information
- Born: 25 January 1862; West Dean, Sussex, England
- Died: 30 September 1925 (aged 63); Durban, Natal, South Africa
- Batting: Right-handed

International information
- National side: South Africa
- Test debut (cap 3): 12 March 1889 v England
- Last Test: 25 March 1889 v England

Career statistics
Competition	Test
Matches	2
Runs scored	14
Batting average	3.50
100s/50s	0/0
Top score	11
Catches/stumpings	3/–
- Source: Cricinfo, 13 November 2022

Philip Hutchinson (25 January 1862 – 30 September 1925) was a South African cricketer who played in two Test matches in South Africa in 1889.

Hutchinson was born in West Dean, Sussex, and attended St Edward's School, Oxford, from 1878 to 1880. In three years in the school's cricket team he took 253 wickets at an average of 6. He migrated to South Africa in about 1885.

Hutchinson made 29, the top score on either side, when Natal lost to the touring R. G. Warton's XI in early February 1889. He also took 2 for 14 from 18 four-ball overs. He was selected to play for South Africa in both Test matches a few weeks later, but along with most of his teammates he was not successful, scoring only 14 runs in four innings and not bowling. Those two matches were the extent of his first-class cricket career.

Hutchinson and his wife Annie Elizabeth lived near Umzimkhulu in what was then known loosely as Griqualand East but is now in the southern part of KwaZulu-Natal. He died in September 1925, aged 63, at a nursing home in Durban.
