= James Roberts (cricketer) =

English cricketer

Personal information
- Full name: James Harry Roberts
- Born: 1 July 1864; Walton, Lancashire, England
- Died: 11 August 1911 (aged 47); Bexhill-on-Sea, Sussex, England
- Batting: Left-handed

Domestic team information
- Years: Team
- 1892: Middlesex

Career statistics
Competition	First-class
Matches	1
Runs scored	35
Batting average	35.00
100s/50s	–/–
Top score	35
Balls bowled	–
Wickets	–
Bowling average	–
5 wickets in innings	–
10 wickets in match	–
Best bowling	–
Catches/stumpings	1/–
- Source: Cricinfo, 8 February 2013

James Harry Roberts (1 July 1864 – 11 August 1911) was an English cricketer. Roberts was a left-handed batsman. He was born in Walton, (now in Liverpool), Lancashire and was educated at Uppingham School.

Roberts toured South Africa with Major Warton's team in 1888/89, playing one match on the tour. He didn't feature in either of the two matches against South Africa which were later given Test status. He later made a single first-class appearance for Middlesex in the 1892 County Championship against Sussex at the County Ground, Hove. He batted once scoring 35 runs in Middlesex's first-innings, before being dismissed by Fred Tate. This was his only first-class appearance for the county.

He died at Bexhill-on-Sea, Sussex on 11 August 1911.
