= Basil Grieve =

English cricketer (1864–1917)

Personal information
- Full name: Basil Arthur Firebrace Grieve
- Born: 28 May 1864; Kilburn, Middlesex
- Died: 19 November 1917 (aged 53); Eastbourne, Sussex
- Batting: Right-handed
- Bowling: Right-arm fast-medium

International information
- National side: England
- Test debut (cap 64): 12 March 1889 v South Africa
- Last Test: 26 March 1889 v South Africa

Career statistics
Competition	Test	First-class
Matches	2	2
Runs scored	40	40
Batting average	40.00	40.00
100s/50s	0/0	0/0
Top score	14*	14*
Catches/stumpings	0/–	0/–
- Source: CricketArchive, 11 October 2022

Basil Arthur Firebrace Grieve (28 May 1864 – 19 November 1917) was an English amateur cricketer who played in two retrospectively-recognised Test matches for England in 1899. Those were his only first-class appearances and he was never a member of any county team. He was born in Kilburn, Middlesex, and died in Eastbourne, Sussex.

Grieve was a right-handed batsman and a right-arm fast medium bowler with an underarm action. He was educated at Harrow and Trinity College, Cambridge. He became a wine merchant by trade. He played cricket at school and took part in the Eton v Harrow match at Lord's in 1883. He became a member of Marylebone Cricket Club in 1885.

== Tour of South Africa, 1888–89 ==
In 1888, Sir Donald Currie agreed to sponsor the first English cricket team to visit South Africa. The 15-man tour party included only nine players who were registered with county clubs and had played in first-class matches. Grieve was one of six additional players who made the numbers up. The team was called Major Warton's XI after its manager, Major R. G. Warton, another occasional player. The captain was future Hollywood actor C. Aubrey Smith, who was then the captain of Sussex County Cricket Club.

Only two matches, both against a team called the South African XI, were eleven-a-side. These were subsequently recognised as the first South Africa v England Test matches. They were played at the St George's Oval in Port Elizabeth and the Newlands Cricket Ground in Cape Town; England won both convincingly. Harry Altham said the standard of the England team was "about that of a weak county". Grieve took part in both matches and in three innings, twice not out, scored a total of 40 runs with a best score of 14*. He did not bowl. Grieve remained in South Africa for a time after the tour ended and is known to have travelled to Johannesburg with his colleague Monty Bowden.
