= Albert Rose-Innes =

South African cricketer

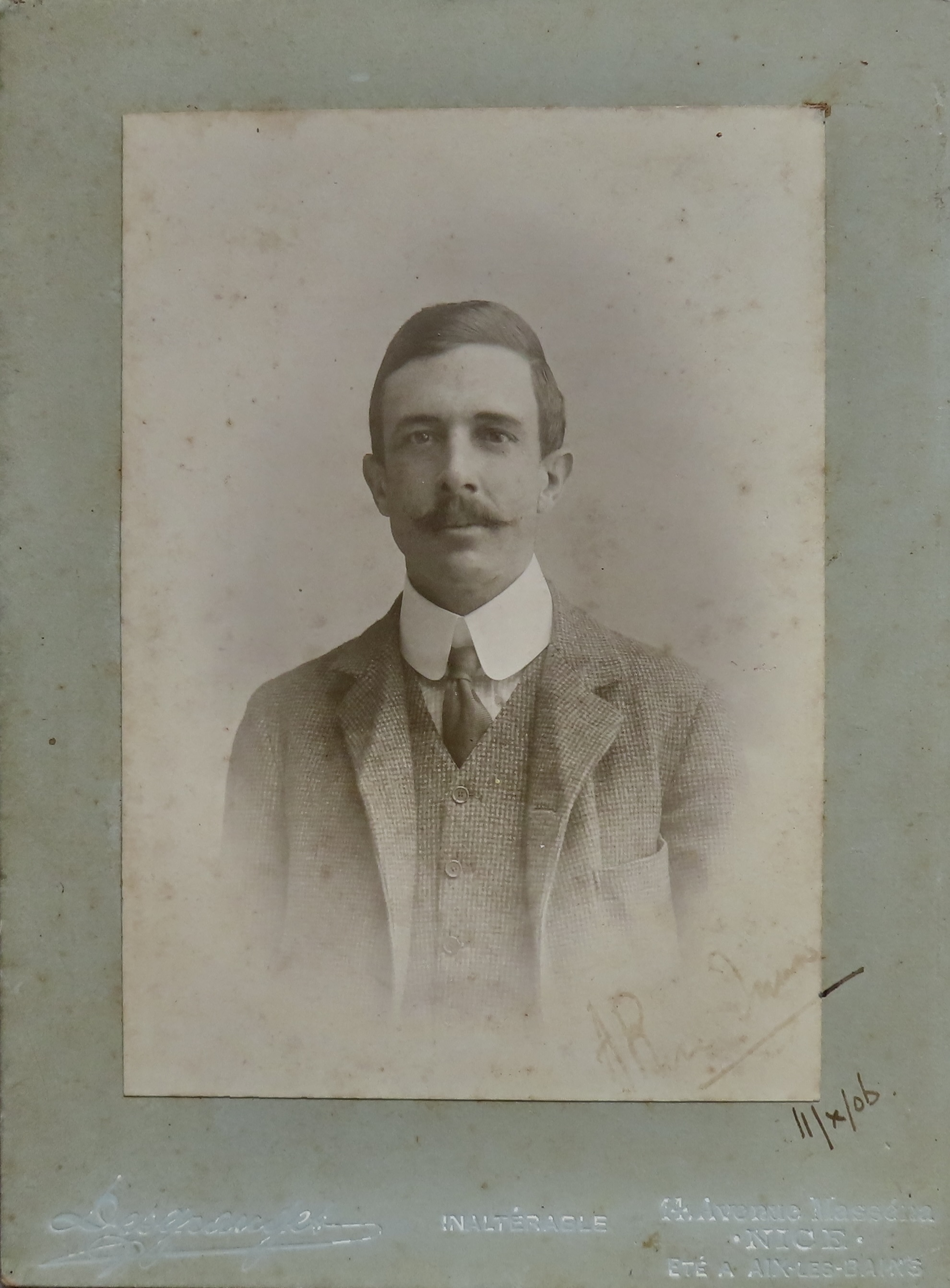
- Rose-Innes in 1906

Personal information
- Born: 16 February 1868; Port Elizabeth, Cape Colony
- Died: 22 November 1946 (aged 78); East London, South Africa
- Batting: Right-handed
- Bowling: Slow left-arm orthodox

International information
- National side: South Africa
- Test debut (cap 7): 12 March 1889 v England
- Last Test: 25 March 1889 v England

Career statistics
Competition	Test	FC
Matches	2	7
Runs scored	14	70
Batting average	3.50	7.77
100s/50s	0/0	0/0
Top score	13	20
Balls bowled	128	608
Wickets	5	18
Bowling average	17.80	17.27
5 wickets in innings	1	1
10 wickets in match	0	0
Best bowling	5/43	5/43
Catches/stumpings	2/–	5/–
- Source: Cricinfo, 10 March 2017

Albert Rose-Innes (16 February 1868 – 22 November 1946) was a South African cricketer who played in South Africa's first two Test matches.

== Cricket career ==
A slow left-arm spin bowler and useful batsman, Rose-Innes played for the Port Elizabeth team in the Kimberley Tournament of 1886–87 and the Champion Bat Tournament of 1887–88, before South African domestic cricket had first-class status. In the 1887–88 competition he took 13 wickets in the match against Grahamstown.

His first-class cricket career began at the same time that South Africa's did, in 1889, with the first representative match between England and South Africa to be accorded Test status. When R.G. Warton brought an English side to South Africa and played the hosts at Port Elizabeth on level terms, eleven versus eleven, a new era was born there.

Rose-Innes opened the batting and scored 0 and 13 and took 5 wickets for 43 runs in England's first innings of that match and he was selected for the second Test, played at Cape Town two weeks later. As England's Johnny Briggs created record figures of 8 for 11 in an innings and 15 for 28 in a match, South Africa were comprehensively beaten by an innings and 202 runs to lose their first Test series 2–0. Rose-Innes again opened the batting and this time made 1 and 0; in the second innings he was run out without facing a ball.

Rose-Innes later played five other first-class matches, three for Kimberley and two for Transvaal. He "terrorised most batsmen" with his left-arm spin, as one account from the period reported. Playing for Kimberley in the very first Currie Cup match, played at Kimberley, he took five wickets in a losing effort against Transvaal. Like so many of his countrymen from the earliest days of South African cricket, Rose-Innes' death went unrecorded and therefore no obituary appeared in Wisden at the time.

== Later life ==
Rose-Innes was seriously wounded in the Second Boer War and never fully recovered. He retired early from his job in a shipping office, and with his wife, Margaret, went to live in a pair of rondavel mud huts overlooking the mouth of the Quinera River at Bonza Bay, on the outskirts of East London, where they raised their son.

Rose-Innes married Margaret Evelyn Foster (born 1885, Wells, Somerset, England and died 1991 in Johannesburg, South Africa). They had one son, Reginald Rose-Innes (born East London, 28 February 1915, died Ringmer, East Sussex, England, 16 January 2012), one grandson and one granddaughter.

== See also ==
- List of South Africa cricketers who have taken five-wicket hauls on Test debut

== Notes ==
1. World Cricketers – A Biographical Dictionary by Christopher Martin-Jenkins, published by Oxford University Press (1996).
2. The Wisden Book of Test Cricket, Volume 1 (1877–1977) compiled and edited by Bill Frindall, published by Headline Book Publishing (1995).
3. www.cricketarchive.com/Archive/Players.
