= Charles Coventry (British Army officer) =

English cricketer (1867–1929)

The Honourable Charles Coventry
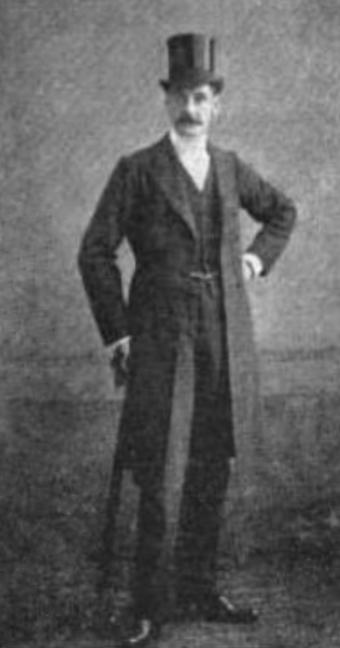
- In The Sketch, 15 January 1896

Personal information
- Full name: Charles John Coventry
- Born: 26 February 1867; Marylebone, Middlesex
- Died: 2 June 1929 (aged 62); Earl's Croome, Worcestershire
- Batting: Right-handed
- Role: Batsman

International information
- National side: England
- Test debut (cap 64): 12 March 1889 v South Africa
- Last Test: 26 March 1889 v South Africa

Career statistics
Competition	Test	First-class
Matches	2	2
Runs scored	13	13
Batting average	13.00	13.00
100s/50s	0/0	0/0
Top score	12	12
Catches/stumpings	0/–	0/–
- Source: CricketArchive, 11 October 2022

Colonel Charles John Coventry CB (26 February 1867 – 2 June 1929) was a British Army officer and an amateur cricketer who played in two retrospectively-recognised Test matches for England in 1889. Those were his only first-class appearances and he was never a member of any first-class county team.

== Biography ==
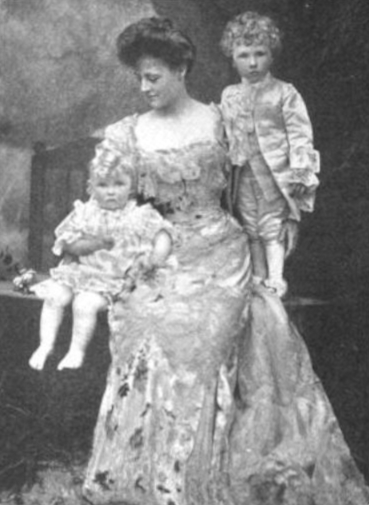
Lily Coventry and children in 1903

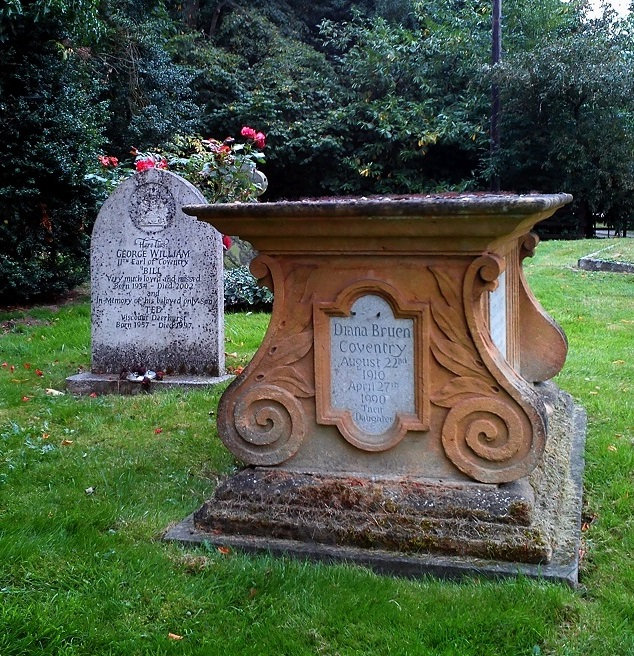
Graves of Charles Coventry and of the 11th Earl of Coventry at St Nicholas' Church, Earl's Croome

Charles Coventry was born in Marylebone, Middlesex, the second son of George Coventry, 9th Earl of Coventry. He was educated at Eton College.

He joined the Worcestershire Militia, and subsequently served with the Bechuanaland Police and British South Africa Company. While with the latter, he was wounded during the Jameson Raid.

In 1922, he took command of the re-formed Worcestershire and Oxfordshire Yeomanry Brigade, now serving as 100 Field Brigade, Royal Artillery. He was appointed a Companion of the Order of the Bath (CB) in the 1923 Birthday Honours. He retired from the Yeomanry in 1925.

He died at his home in Earl's Croome, Worcestershire on 2 June 1929.

== Cricket ==
Coventry played his cricket for Worcestershire when it was still a minor county, that is, a county without first-class status. He was described as "a fair bat with a free style who can hit hard".

When the English tour to South Africa in 1888–89 was being put together, because the South Africans were considered weak, weaker players were selected for the English team. Coventry was one of those players selected. England still won the two games against representative South African sides easily, though Coventry did not feature prominently in either game: he batted at number 10 and did not bowl. On the whole tour he scored 174 runs at an average of 10.23 with a highest score of 33 not out, and took three wickets. He played no first-class cricket in his career other than in those two Tests.

== Family ==
Coventry married, in St Peter's Church, Eaton Square, on 16 January 1900, Lily Whitehouse, younger daughter of Mr. FitzHugh Whitehouse, of Newport, US. His younger son Francis briefly succeeded as 12th Earl of Coventry.
