= Fred Smith (South African cricketer) =

South African cricketer (1861–1914)

Personal information
- Born: 31 March 1861; Uitenhage, Cape Colony
- Died: 17 April 1914 (aged 53); Johannesburg, Transvaal
- Batting: Right-handed

International information
- National side: South Africa
- Test debut (cap 8): 12 March 1889 v England
- Last Test: 2 March 1896 v England

Career statistics
| Competition | Test | First-class |
|---|---|---|
| Matches | 3 | 5 |
| Runs scored | 45 | 140 |
| Batting average | 9.00 | 15.55 |
| 100s/50s | 0/0 | 0/0 |
| Top score | 12 | 43 |
| Balls bowled | – | 355 |
| Wickets | – | 3 |
| Bowling average | – | 44.33 |
| 5 wickets in innings | – | 0 |
| 10 wickets in match | – | 0 |
| Best bowling | – | 2/73 |
| Catches/stumpings | 2/– | 2/– |
- Source: Cricinfo, 13 November 2022

Frederick William Smith (31 March 1861 – 17 April 1914) was a South African cricketer who played in three Test matches from 1889 to 1896.

Fred Smith was the second child and eldest son of the six children of John and Primrose Smith, who were farmers. In 1871 the family moved to Bloemfontein, where John worked as a clerk. Fred married Maria Campbell in May 1888.

Smith captained both Kimberley and Transvaal and was instrumental in the formation of the Transvaal Cricket Union. He also won many trophies as a sprinter. He was a quick-scoring batsman and a wicket-keeper, as well as an occasional bowler. He was a successful batsman for Kimberley in minor cricket in the late 1880s, and was selected to play in South Africa's first Test, against England in 1888–89.
