= Bernard Tancred =

South African cricketer

Personal information
- Full name: Augustus Bernard Tancred
- Born: 20 August 1865; Port Elizabeth, Cape Colony
- Died: 23 November 1911 (aged 46); Cape Town, Cape Province, South Africa
- Batting: Right-handed
- Bowling: Right-arm medium

International information
- National side: South Africa
- Test debut (cap 10): 12 March 1889 v England
- Last Test: 25 March 1889 v England

Career statistics
Competition	Test	First-class
Matches	2	11
Runs scored	87	708
Batting average	29.00	35.40
100s/50s	0/0	1/5
Top score	29	106
Balls bowled	–	484
Wickets	–	8
Bowling average	–	27.50
5 wickets in innings	–	0
10 wickets in match	–	0
Best bowling	–	3/22
Catches/stumpings	2/–	6/–
- Source: ESPNcricinfo, 28 December 2015

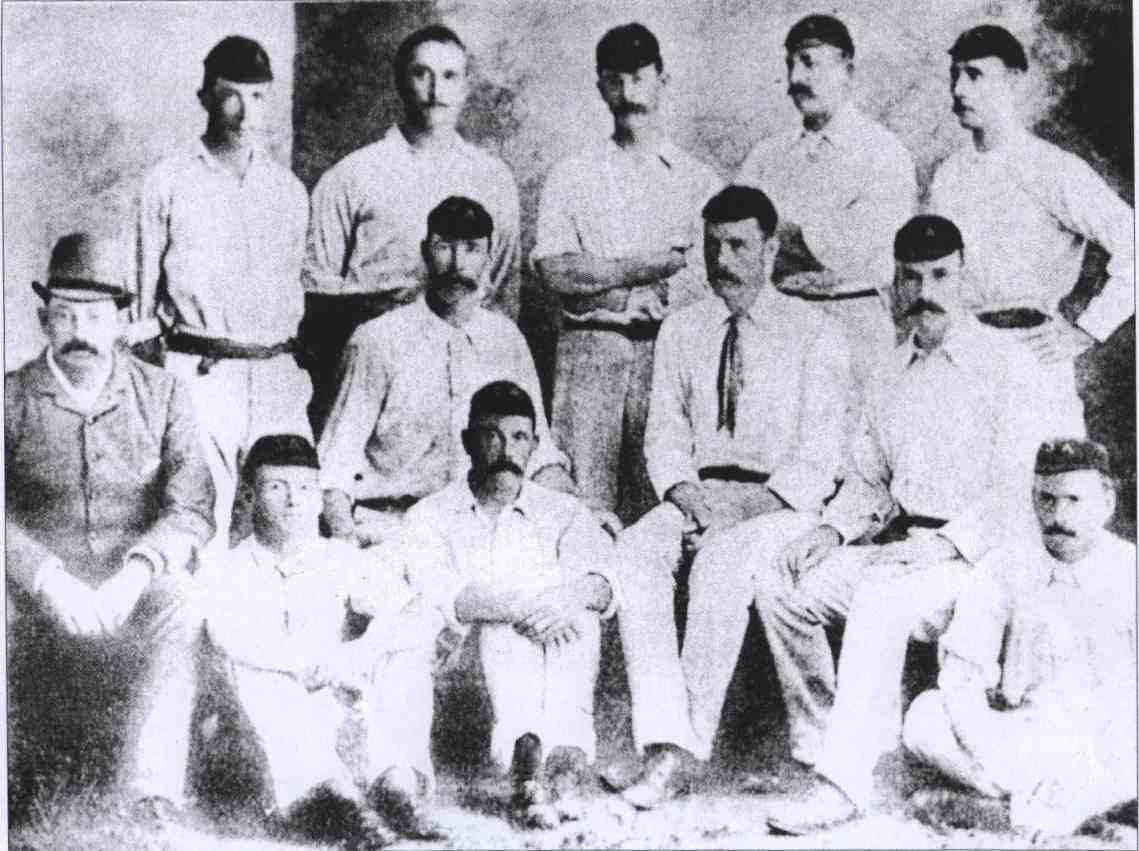
The inaugural South African Test team. Tancred is standing, second from left

Augustus Bernard Tancred (20 August 1865 – 23 November 1911) was a 19th-century South African Test cricketer. His brothers, Vincent and Louis, also played Test cricket for South Africa.

== Early life ==
Born in Port Elizabeth, South Africa, Tancred attended St. Aidan's College, Grahamstown, where he first displayed his cricketing prowess. His contemporaries at school included Percy Fitzpatrick and Charles Coghlan. He attended the Cape University and although there are no records to indicate that he graduated he practised law throughout South Africa, including Kimberley, Pretoria and Johannesburg. He became a prominent member of the Uitlander community. Tancred continued to star in club cricket, gaining a reputation as the best batsman in South Africa, with a strong defence, as well as an outstanding point fielder.

== Career ==
Tancred was an obvious choice for the first South African cricket side, assembled to play the first touring English cricket team during its two Test tour of South Africa in the 1888–89 South African cricket season. While the South African cricket team lost both Tests, Tancred's 87 runs made him the leading South African run-scorer in the series and he became the first batsman to carry his bat in a Test, when he scored an unbeaten 26 of 47 in the second Test at Newlands Cricket Ground. This innings is still the Test Match record for the lowest score made by a batsman carrying their bat through an innings.

The following season Tancred played for Kimberley against Transvaal in the inaugural Currie Cup, with his second innings 106 the maiden Currie Cup century. He also reinforced his stature in South African cricket and society by founding the Transvaal Cricket Union in 1891 and serving as its foundation chairman. Married in 1893 to Adeline Wainwright, who bore him three daughters, Tancred's increasing work commitments forced his withdrawal from the 1894 South African tour of England.

The increase in tensions in South Africa between the Boers and Uitlanders saw 'Captain' Tancred and others guarding the main Pretoria – Johannesburg road. The following year, Tancred travelled to England possibly to attend a House of Commons inquiry into the Jameson Raid, and, his cricketing fame having preceded him, he was made an honorary member of the Marylebone Cricket Club and turned out for the club against the Derbyshire County Cricket Club. He was also made an honorary member of Surrey County Cricket Club.

Tancred played his final first class match in February 1899 in the 1898–99 South African cricket season, representing Transvaal against Lord Hawke's touring English side but was again unavailable for the Test series due to business concerns.

== Later life ==
During the Second Boer War, Tancred worked for British intelligence and then as Legal Adviser to the Military Governor in Bloemfontein, necessitating his absence from the 1901 South African tour of England, which it had been thought he would captain. Following the end of the war, Tancred moved to Salisbury to open a law firm in partnership with his fellow St Aidan's alumni (and future Premier of Southern Rhodesia) Sir Charles Coghlan. While in Salisbury in 1911, Tancred became seriously ill and was brought to Cape Town en route to England to receive specialist treatment but, after a deterioration in his condition, underwent emergency surgery and died in Cape Town the day his ship left for England.

Survived by his wife and three daughters (a son died young), Tancred had become known as the "W. G. Grace of South Africa" for his cricketing exploits and Wisden Cricketers' Almanack called him "undoubtedly the finest batsman in South Africa".

== Sources ==
- Hall, BT & Schulze, H (2000) "The Cricketing Brothers Tancred, Part 1", The Cricket Statistician, No. 111, Association of Cricket Statisticians and Historians, Orpington, Kent. See also No. 112 and 129.
- Murray, B & Vahed, G (2009) Empire and Cricket: The South African Experience 1884–1914, chapter 6.
- Schulze, H (1999) South Africa's Cricketing Lawyers, chapter 2.
