= Henry Wood (cricketer, born 1853) =

English cricketer

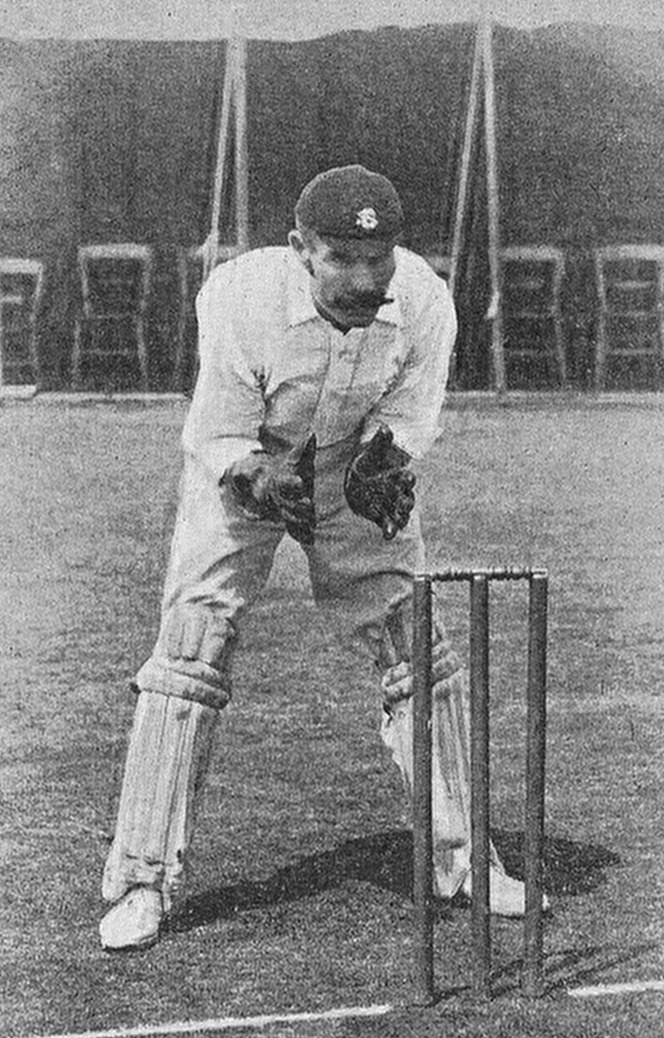
- Henry Wood

Cricket information
- Batting: Right-handed
- Bowling: Right-arm medium

International information
- National side: England
- Test debut: 13 August 1888 v Australia
- Last Test: 19 March 1892 v South Africa

Career statistics
Competition	Test	First-class
Matches	4	316
Runs scored	204	5523
Batting average	68.00	16.94
100s/50s	1/1	1/17
Top score	134*	134*
Balls bowled	–	65
Wickets	–	0
Bowling average	–	–
5 wickets in innings	–	–
10 wickets in match	–	–
Best bowling	–	–
Catches/stumpings	2/1	556/118
- Source: CricInfo, 6 June 2020

Henry Wood (14 December 1853 – 30 April 1919) was an English cricketer who briefly played Test cricket for England, and enjoyed a successful career for Kent and Surrey that spanned the years between 1876 and 1900. A right-handed batsman who also bowled part-time right-arm fast, Wood was primarily a wicketkeeper. He was Wisden Cricketer of the Year in 1891. Although his batting average across his entire first-class career was 16.94, his Test batting average was 68.00 thanks to scores of 59 and 134* in his final two innings. His average is statistically the highest of any England Test player, however a standard qualification of twenty innings played deducts him from the recognised lists. He was the first wicketkeeper to score a Test century.

== Playing career ==
Wood was born in December 1853 in Dartford, Kent. He earned early recognition while a pupil at Dartford Grammar School, where his cricketing prowess was first evident. He played cricket as a professional for St Stanislaus College in Tullamore, Ireland in 1877, followed by stints at Catford Bridge and then Dover, Kent. He also made his first-class debut for Kent on 8 June 1876, taking two catches and performing three stumpings, and scoring 12 and 13 with the bat. He would play nine matches for Kent in total, scoring 72 runs at 5.14 but taking 12 catches and performing six stumpings. Outside of cricket, he worked at an engineering firm in Greenwich.

It was for Surrey that Wood would be at his most prolific. After a winter stint at Streatham Cricket Ground which enabled him to qualify for selection, he made his Surrey debut on 19 May 1884 against a touring Australian team. He was bowled by Fred Spofforth for a duck but made five in his second innings. He took 21 catches and 12 stumpings in his first season for Surrey, and the next year took 23 further catches and scored three half-centuries. A career best 35 catchesd came in the 1886 season, and a best of 75 with the bat in 1887. In 1888, on the back of tidy glove work, he was chosen to play for England against Australia on 13 August, and though he made eight with the bat he stumped Harry Trott and caught George Bonnor. He then toured South Africa in the spring of 1889, scoring three in the first Test on 12 March, followed by his maiden Test half-century on 25 March when he scored 59 from 89 balls. He continued to be sound with the gloves in England across the 1889 and 1890 seasons, taking 26 catches and three stumpings followed by 31 catches and eight stumpings over those two years. On 19 March he played his final Test, having been selected to tour South Africa for a second time. Batting at eight, he scored an undefeated 134. This was the first instance when a wicketkeeper scored a century in Test match. Gilbert Jessop described him as "a dashing hitter."

Towards the later stages of his career he suffered from failing eyesight, and repeated fractures to his fingers. He averaged 30.26 with the bat in 1895 including four half-centuries, and grew more prolific with the gloves: passing fifty catches in a season in both 1896 and 1897. He batting average otherwise remained in the mid-teens, however, and he played only nine matches in 1900 before his professional playing career ended. He became a full-time umpire in 1910, having umpired sporadically as early as 1891, and in total he stood in 94 first-class matches. He died in Waddon, Surrey in 1919.

== Bibliography ==
- Carlaw, Derek (2020). Kent County Cricketers, A to Z: Part One (1806–1914) (PDF). Cardiff: ACS.
