= Henry Webster (cricketer) =

English cricketer

Henry Haywood Webster (8 May 1844 – 5 March 1915) was an English first-class cricketer, who played in two matches for Yorkshire County Cricket Club in 1868, against Middlesex and Surrey.

Born in Handsworth, part of Sheffield, Yorkshire, Webster was a right-handed batsman who scored 10 runs at an average of 3.33. His highest first-class score was 10 against Middlesex.

Webster played non-first-class cricket for Sheffield Cricket Club during the 1860s and for teams in Birmingham and for Staffordshire County Cricket Club in the 1870s before moving to live in South Africa. He played for Port Elizabeth Cricket Club and for Eastern Province during the 1880s and 1890s and died in March 1915, in Port Elizabeth in Cape Province, South Africa. When he died his name was registered as Henry Hayward Webster.
