= Champion Bat Tournament =

- Countries: South Africa
- Format: First-class
- First edition: 1875–76
- Latest edition: 1890–91

The Champion Bat Tournament was a cricket tournament played in the late 1800s in present-day South Africa. Rather than a cup, the winner of the tournament was presented with the "Champion Bat" – a cricket bat emblazoned with a silver crest.

Contested approximately every three to four years, it was first held in 1876 in Port Elizabeth, between teams representing the major settlements of the Cape Colony. Although the exact composition varied, the town-based format continued until the tournament's final edition during the 1890–91 season, which was played between Eastern Province, Griqualand West, and Western Province (teams which still compete in South African domestic cricket). The tournament was played five times before being superseded by the Currie Cup as the premier South African cricket tournament. Only the last edition of the Champion Bat was accorded first-class status.

== 1875–76 tournament ==
The inaugural tournament was played in Port Elizabeth from 6–12 January 1876, with the tournament's prize, the Champion Bat, donated by the town's mayor, Henry William Pearson (later an MP), on behalf of the Port Elizabeth Town Council. Four teams competed in the 1876 tournament, representing Cape Town, Grahamstown, King William's Town, and Port Elizabeth, with all matches played at St George's Park. Matches were played over two innings, invariably lasting only one day each owing to their low-scoring nature. Each team was to play each other once (a "round-robin"), for a total of six matches:

- 6 January 1876: Grahamstown defeats Port Elizabeth by 47 runs, with Grahamstown's A. Edkins taking a ten-wicket haul, 5/11 in each innings.
- 7 January 1876: King William's Town defeats Grahamstown by six wickets, with Edkins taking another ten-wicket haul, 8/32 and 2/49. William Heugh took 7/34 in Grahamstown first innings.
- 8 January 1876: King William's Town defeats Port Elizabeth by three wickets.
- 10 January 1876: Cape Town defeats Port Elizabeth by three wickets, with Cape Town's Melck taking a ten-wicket haul, 5/16 and 7/24.
- 11 January 1876: King William's Town defeats Cape Town by four wickets, with Melck taking another ten-wicket haul, 6/19 and 4/13.
- 12 January 1876: Cape Town versus Grahamstown – fixtured, but no scorecard recorded by CricketArchive.

As the Grahamstown team had won all three of its matches, its captain was presented with the Champion Bat, to be held until the next tournament. A celebratory dinner and ball were held at the Port Elizabeth City Hall, on 8 and 12 January, respectively.

== 1879–80 tournament ==
The second tournament was held in King William's Town from 14 to 22 January 1880, and included a team from Queenstown for the first time. A final was played, with King William's Town easily defeating Port Elizabeth to win the tournament for the first time.

== 1884–85 tournament ==
The third tournament was held in Port Elizabeth for a second time, from 22 to 31 December 1884. The tournament was reduced to four teams, with the teams from Grahamstown and Queenstown replaced by a team from the far inland town of Kimberley, in Griqualand West, newly annexed to the Cape Colony. Port Elizabeth won the tournament for the first time.

== 1887–88 tournament ==
The fourth tournament was held at Grahamstown's Albany Sports Club from 26 December 1887 to 3 January 1888. Cape Town was replaced by Grahamstown, the host. Kimberley won the tournament for the first time.

== 1890–91 tournament and aftermath ==
The fifth and final tournament was held at Cape Town's Newlands ground from 26 December 1890 to 3 January 1891. Eastern Province, Griqualand West, and Western Province fielded sides, and the three matches played were accorded first-class status. Western Province won both their games, and hence won the tournament.
