= South Africa national cricket team =

National cricket team of South Africa

South Africa
- Nickname: Proteas
- Association: Cricket South Africa

Personnel
- Test captain: Temba Bavuma
- One Day captain: Temba Bavuma
- T20I captain: Aiden Markram
- Coach: Shukri Conrad

History
- Test status acquired: 1889

International Cricket Council
- ICC status: Full member (1909)
- ICC region: Africa Cricket Association
| ICC Rankings | Current | Best-ever |
| Test | 1st | 1st (1 January 1969) |
| ODI | 3rd | 1st (1 May 1996) |
| T20I | 5th | 1st (8 August 2012) |

Tests
- First Test: v England at St George's Park Cricket Ground, Port Elizabeth, 12–13 March 1889
- Last Test: v Bangladesh at Wanderers Stadium, Johannesburg; 15–19 November 2026
| Tests | Played | Won/Lost |
| Total | 483 | 194/163 (126 draws) |
| This year | 4 | 3/1 (0 draws) |
- World Test Championship appearances: 3 (first in 2019–2021)
- Best result: Champions (2023–2025)

One Day Internationals
- First ODI: v India at Eden Gardens, Kolkata; 10 November 1991
- Last ODI: v Australia at JB Marks Oval, Potchefstroom; 30 September 2026
| ODIs | Played | Won/Lost |
| Total | 704 | 426/251 (6 ties, 21 no results) |
| This year | 6 | 5/1 (0 ties, 0 no results) |
- World Cup appearances: 9 (first in 1992)
- Best result: Semi-finals (1992, 1999, 2007, 2015, 2023)

T20 Internationals
- First T20I: v New Zealand at Wanderers Stadium, Johannesburg; 21 October 2005
- Last T20I: v Zimbabwe at Namibia Cricket Ground, Windhoek; 6 September 2026
| T20Is | Played | Won/Lost |
| Total | 235 | 129/101 (2 ties, 3 no results) |
| This year | 21 | 15/5 (1 tie, 0 no results) |
- T20 World Cup appearances: 10 (first in 2007)
- Best result: Runners-up (2024)
- Official website: https://cricket.co.za/
Test kit
ODI kit
T20I kit
- As of 19 November 2026

The South Africa Men's Cricket Team, also known as the Proteas, represents South Africa in men's international cricket and is administered by Cricket South Africa. South Africa is a full member of the International Cricket Council. The team's nickname derives from South Africa's national flower, Protea cynaroides, commonly known as the "King Protea". South Africa are the current World Test Champions.

South Africa entered first-class and international cricket at the same time when they hosted an England cricket team in the 1888–89 season. Initially, the team was no match for Australia or England but, having gained experience and expertise, they were able to field a competitive team by the first decade of the 20th century. The team regularly played against Australia, England and New Zealand through to the 1960s, by which time there was considerable opposition to the country's apartheid policy. The ICC imposed an international ban on the team, commensurate with actions taken by other global sporting bodies. When the ban was imposed, South Africa had developed to a point where its team was arguably the best in the world, and even out-played Australia.

The ban remained in place until 1991, after which South Africa played against India, Pakistan, Sri Lanka and the West Indies for the first time. The team has been strong since its reinstatement, and has at several times held the number-one positions in international rankings. South Africa is also one of the most successful teams in ODI cricket, winning more than 60 per cent of their matches. However, the 1998 Champions Trophy was its first success in ICC-organised limited-overs tournaments. South Africa won the gold medal at the Commonwealth Games in 1998. South Africa won the 2023–2025 ICC World Test Championship, beating Australia by 5 wickets in the final.

== History ==
=== Beginnings and early developments ===
European colonisation of southern Africa began on Tuesday, 6 April 1652 when the Dutch East India Company established a settlement called the Cape Colony on Table Bay, near present-day Cape Town, and continued to expand into the hinterland through the 17th and 18th centuries. It was founded as a victualling station for the Dutch East Indies trade route but soon acquired an importance of its own due to its good farmland and mineral wealth. There was virtually no British interest in South Africa until 1795 when troops under General Sir James Henry Craig seized Cape Colony during the French Revolutionary War, the Netherlands having been occupied by French forces the same year. After the British seized Cape Colony a second time in 1806 to counteract French interests in the region in the course of the Napoleonic Wars, Cape Colony was turned into a permanent British settlement. As in most other parts of the world, British colonisation brought in its wake the introduction of the game of cricket, which began to develop rapidly. The first-ever recorded cricket match in South Africa took place in 1808, in Cape Town between two service teams for a prize of one thousand rix-dollars.

The oldest cricket club in South Africa is the Port Elizabeth Cricket Club, founded in 1843. In 1862, an annual fixture "Mother Country v Colonial Born" was staged for the first time in Cape Town. By the late 1840s, the game had spread from its early roots in Cape Colony and permeated the Afrikaners in the territories of Orange Free State and Transvaal, who were descendants of the original Dutch settlers and were not considered naturally a cricket-playing people. In 1876, Port Elizabeth presented the "Champion Bat" for competition between South African towns. The first tournament was staged in Port Elizabeth. King William's Town Cricket Club won the tournament in 1876 and the following year, in 1877, too.

In 1888, Sir Donald Currie sponsored the first English team to tour South Africa. It was managed by Major R. G. Warton and captained by future Hollywood actor C. Aubrey Smith. The tour marked the advent, retrospectively, of both first-class and Test cricket in South Africa. Currie donated the Currie Cup (originally called the Kimberley Cup) that became the trophy, first won by Transvaal in 1889–90, for a national championship of the provincial teams in South Africa.

=== Early Test history ===
In 1889, South Africa became the third test-playing nation when it played against England at Port Elizabeth captained by Owen Robert Dunell. Soon after, a 2nd test was played at Cape Town. However, these two matches, as was the case with all early matches involving the erstwhile 'South African XI' against all touring teams, did not receive the status of official 'Test' matches until South Africa formed the Imperial Cricket Conference with England and Australia in 1906. Neither did the touring English team organised by Major Warton even claim to be representing the English cricket team; the matches were marketed as 'Major Warton's XI' v/s 'South African XI' instead. Even the players who participated did not know that they had played international cricket, and the side that played South Africa was regarded to be of weak county strength. The team was captained by C. Aubrey Smith, a decent medium pacer from Sussex, and for two of the Major Warton's XI, Basil Grieve and The Honourable Charles Coventry, the two Tests constituted their entire first-class career. Even so, the nascent, fledgling 'South African XI' was very weak, losing both tests comfortably to England, English spinner Johnny Briggs claiming 15–28 in the second Test at Cape Town. However, Albert Rose-Innes did make history by becoming the first South African bowler to take a five-wicket haul in Tests at Port Elizabeth.

South Africa's early Test record remains the worst among all current Test-playing nations with ten defeats and just a solitary draw from their first eleven tests, and it was not until 1904 that they began to emerge as a quality international team. They recorded their first Test win against England in 1906, which took them 17 years. The low point of this barren early period for the South African team was an English tour of 1895–96, where South Africa was humiliated 3–0 in 3 Tests by an English side for the first time remotely comparable to a full-strength team, losing all the tests by 288 runs, an innings and 197 runs, and by an innings and 32 runs respectively. The touring English team, arranged by Lord Hawke, included four of the best cricketers of the world at the time: Tom Hayward, C.B. Fry, George Lohmann and Sammy Woods.

=== Emergence as a quality international team ===
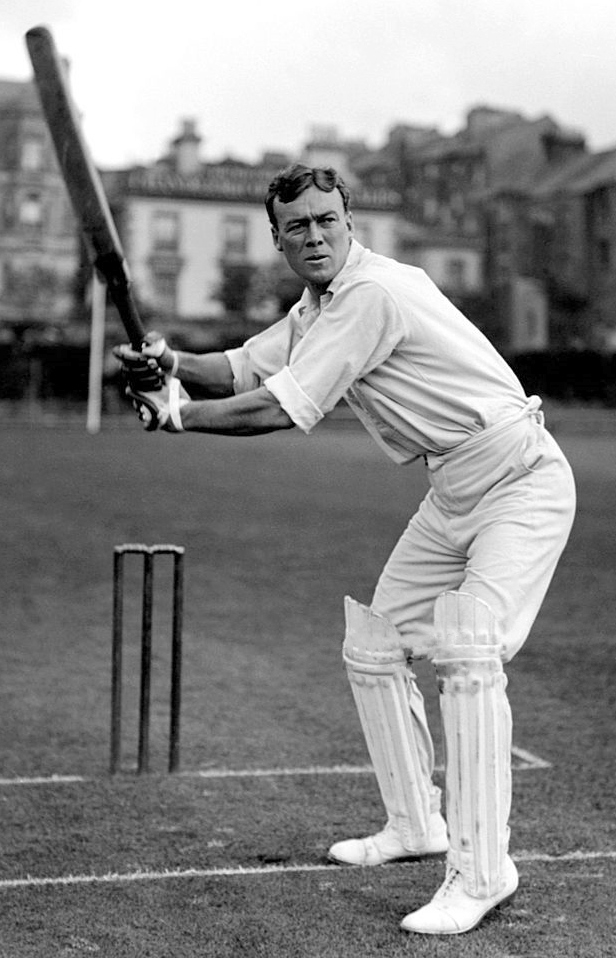
Jimmy Sinclair, who holds the record for the highest strike rate in the history of Test cricket

In the early 1900s, the first world-class South African cricket team emerged, comprising stars such Bonnor Middleton, Jimmy Sinclair, Charlie Llewellyn, Dave Nourse, Louis Tancred, Aubrey Faulkner, Reggie Schwarz, Percy Sherwell, Tip Snooke, Bert Vogler, and Gordon White, players who were capable of giving any international teams a run for their money. In addition to possessing batsmen such as Sinclair (the batsman with the highest strike rate in Test history), Nourse, Tancred, all-rounder Faulkner, Sherwell, Snooker, and White, the South Africans developed the world's first (and arguably greatest) spin attack which specialised in googly. Greatest among the South African googly quartet was Schwarz, who, inspired by English googly bowler Bernard Bosanquet, regarded as the inventor of the googly, developed into the most devastating googly bowler of his time. He taught diligently the secrets of the googly to allrounder Faulkner, medium-pacer Vogler, and specialist batsman White, and together the four formed a quartet which began to lead South Africa to unprecedented heights in Test cricket. Another important force during this period for South Africa was the all-around performances of Faulkner and Llewellyn. Faulkner came to be regarded as the first great South African all-rounders in the international game, regarded by some as even the greatest all-rounder in the world in the pre-1st World War period.

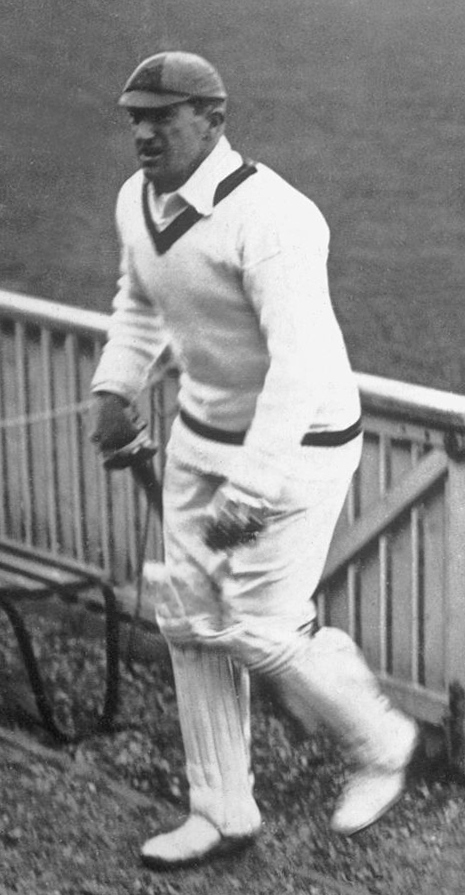
Aubrey Faulkner, regarded as the first great South African all-rounder in international cricket. In a legendary 25-match Test career spanning from 1906 to 1924, he scored 1754 runs at 40.79 and claimed 82 wickets at 26.58

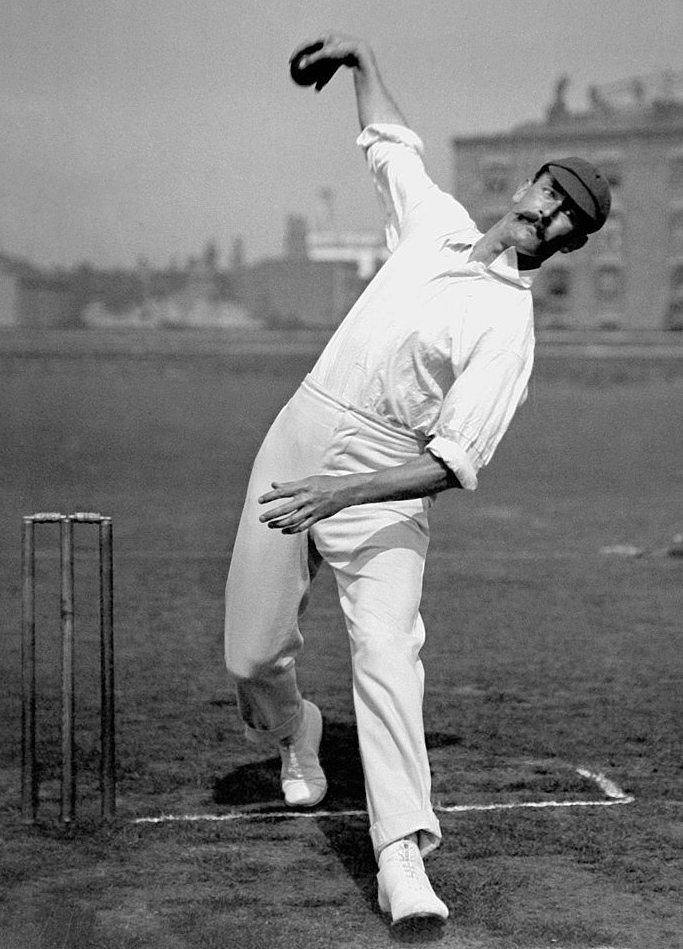
Reggie Schwarz, the pioneer of the googly and the 'googly revolution' in South Africa and one of the world's first great googly bowlers

The Australian cricket team toured South Africa in 1902, with an extremely strong squad comprising many prominent members of 'The Golden Age of Australian Cricket' such as Victor Trumper, Joe Darling, Clem Hill, Syd Gregory, Monty Noble, Reggie Duff, Warwick Armstrong, Hugh Trumble, and Ernie Jones. Though South Africa lost the 3-match Test series 2–0, they avoided defeat for the first time by drawing the first game at Johannesburg, even forcing the touring side to follow on thanks to some outstanding all-round performances from Llewellyn.

In 1904, South Africa was invited by the Marylebone Cricket Club for a tour of England to play a series of first-class matches, the team not being regarded as sufficiently high standard to play-official Tests. The side won ten out of their twenty-two matches, including a thrilling tie with Middlesex, who finished among the top four in that year's County Championship, due to some magic weaved by Schwarz through his googlies. He repeated his heroics against an all-England XI, whom South Africa recorded an upset victory against by 189 runs. Unfortunately, the match was not accorded official Test status.

In 1906, England made a reciprocal tour to South Africa, which this time consisted of a 5-match official Test series. The touring English team was a second-string team, with only Colin Blythe, Schofield Haigh and JN Crawford being those who could be considered regulars of the England team. Nevertheless, South Africa was still not favouriting going into the series. However, in a shocking result at Johannesburg, the inspired South Africans, led by Sherwell and their googly quartet, defeated England by 1 wicket, thereby recording her first Test win. Schwarz, Vogler, and Faulkner led the way for South Africa. Afterwards, South Africa defeated England by 9 wickets in the 2nd Test at Johannesburg, a 243-run win in the 3rd test at the same venue as well as an innings-and-16 runs victory at Cape Town in the 5th Test to secure a 4–1 domination of England. Schwarz picked up 18 in the series at 17.22, Faulkner 14 at 19.42. However, Vogler was not so successful with 9 wickets at 22.33. The series is widely recognised as the one which heralded the arrival of South Africa as a major force on the international cricket scene. The MCC duly complied by inviting the South African team to tour England in 1907 for the first time to play-official Tests. Though the series finished 1–0 to England with two draws, the quartet of Schwarz, Faulkner, Vogler, and White were praised for their exceptional quality of googly bowling, and Schwarz and Vogler came to be recognised as Wisden Cricketers of the Year the following year – the first South Africans to win the prestigious award.

England's next tour of South Africa came about in 1909–10. Once again, South Africa was dominant, winning the 5-match Test series 3–2, with victories in the first Test at Johannesburg by 19 runs, second Test at Durban by 95 runs, and by 4 wickets in the 4th Test at Cape Town. South Africa's captain was Tip Snooke.

The South African cricket team toured Australia for the first time in 1910–11. The Australian team was then considered as the leading cricket team of the era, in what has been described as 'The Golden Age of Australian Cricket'. Led by the legendary Clem Hill and the batting exploits of Victor Trumper, Australia won the 5-match Test series comfortably 4–1, though South Africa made history by recording their first-ever overseas Test victory, as well as a maiden Test victory against Australia at the 3rd Test in Adelaide Oval. The tour was significant for the rise of Billy Zulch as a leading batsman of the South African cricket team; and after a resolute 150 in the 1st Test at Sydney Cricket Ground in a heavy innings defeat for South Africa, he scored South Africa's highest individual score of 105 in their maiden overseas Test win at Adelaide, a match also characterised by the all-round performances Charlie Llewellyn and the outstanding bowling of Reggie Schwarz.

South Africa's next international cricketing involvement was a triangular tournament held in England, involving England, Australia, and South Africa, the only three Test-playing nations of the era. By this time, the googly duo of Schwarz and White were past their prime, while Vogler had already retired. Additionally, retirements of key players such as Sherwell ensured that South Africa was nowhere near their best in the series. South Africa finished bottom with just one draw, but the series was notable for the debut of Herbie Taylor, regarded as one of the finest batsmen of the era. The tournament marked the international swansong for Schwarz and White. The tournament also marked the peak of the short, but moderately successful test career of medium-pacer Sid Pegler, whose rise, coinciding as it did with the decline of Schwarz and Vogler, briefly caused him to hold the mantle of the lead bowler of the South African bowling attack before as well as to emerge as South Africa's leading bowler and a resounding success in the Triangular tournament, before commitments elsewhere in the form of the appointment as a colonial district commissioner in Nyasaland forced him to drift out of cricket – meaning that the enormous potential that he showed in that Triangular, as well as the expectations that he could be a mainstay in the South African bowling in the coming years, were not quite fulfilled.

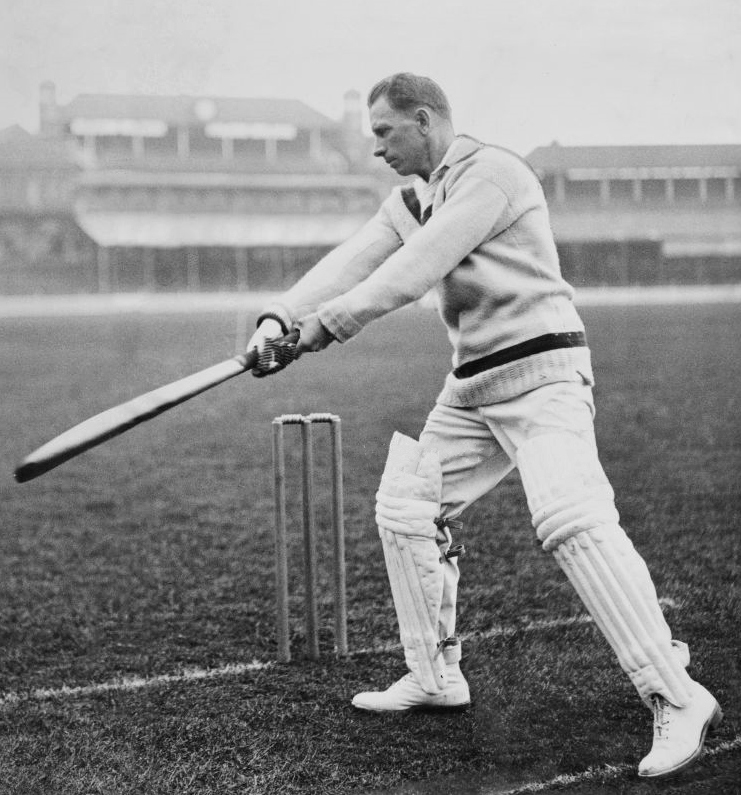
Herbie Taylor, whose career spanned 20 years and 42 Tests, was the first South African to reach the landmark of 2,500 Test runs at an average of 40.77. He was the mainstay of the South African batting as well as one of the leading batsmen in the world from his debut in 1912 until his retirement in 1932. He was an expert on the matting pitches that were prevalent in South Africa at the time and scored six of his seven centuries at home. His batting was also noted for quick footwork and exceptional 'back play'.

Prodigious batsman Herbie Taylor was named captain of the South African team to face off against the visiting English team in 1913–14, in what would prove South Africa's last international cricketing involvement before the First World War. Overall, the series was extremely poor for a South African side in transition, who failed to replicate the achievements of the South African sides 1905–06 and 1909–10, losing the 5-match Test series 4–0 against an extremely strong English side playing under the banner of the MCC. However, the series became memorable for Herbie Taylor's exceptional batting, who heralded his arrival as a new colossus in the world game, scoring a phenomenal 508 runs at an average of 50.80 against a terrific Sydney Barnes at his prime, who had claimed a record 49 wickets during the series at just 10.93. The cricket historian H.S. Altham wrote: "The English cricketers were unanimous that finer batting than his against Barnes at his best they never hoped to see." Neville Cardus noted it was "perhaps the most skillful of all Test performances by a batsman." It also led Cardus to count Taylor as "one of the six greatest batsmen of the post-Grace period".

=== The inter-war years ===
The war brought in its wake the temporary suspension of international cricket. The Currie Cup, which had hitherto not been held during the years of The Boer War (1899–1902) and on the years when England had visited as a touring team, faced cancellation during the years of war (1914–18). Cricketing activity in South Africa resumed to normal with the armistice in November 1918.

Post World War I, South Africa first hosted in 1919–20 an Australian Imperial Forces side boasting cricketers of the calibre of Jack Gregory, Herbie Collins, Bert Oldfield, and Nip Pellew. The South African XI lost both of their matches against them.

Australia became the first international team to make an official tour to South Africa in 1921–22. The first two tests at Durban and Johannesburg were drawn, with Australia sealing the series 1–0 with a 10-wicket win in the 3rd Test at Cape Town. Herbie Taylor, who captained the South Africans, finished with 200 runs at 33.33. Claude Carter was the South Africans' leading bowler, taking 15 wickets at 21.93.

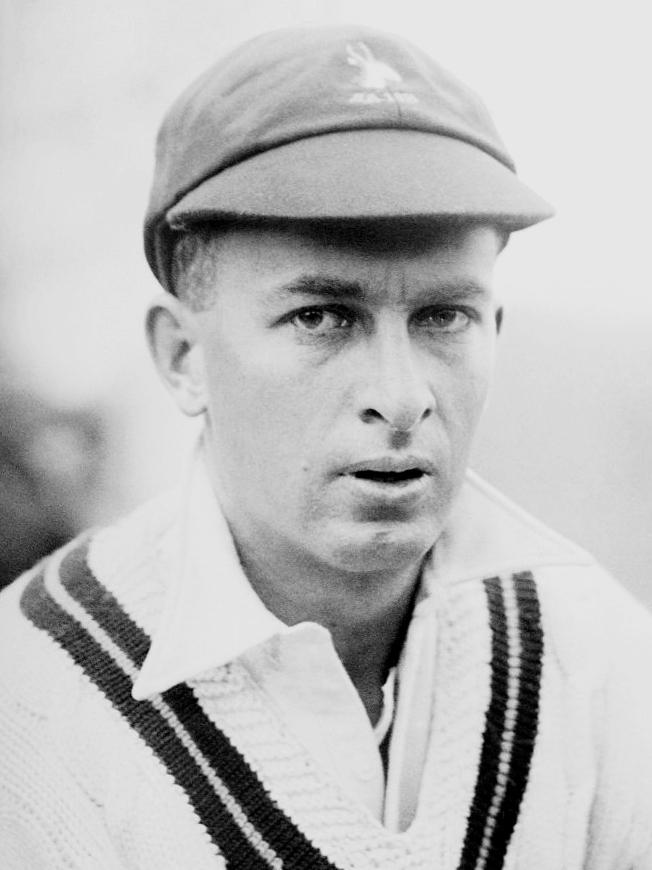
Bruce Mitchell, who scored 3,471 Test runs, at that time a national record

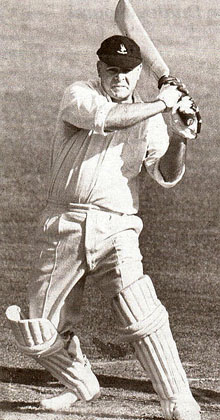
Dudley Nourse, who scored 2960 Test runs in 34 Tests at 53.81 and had 9 centuries to his credit, at the time a national record

The following season, in 1922–23, an English cricket team toured. Just like nine years, previous Taylor was at his best. In the first Test at Johannesburg, he batted at number three and in the second innings scored a superb 176, the next highest score in the match was 50. Taylor's knock included 25 boundaries and was the largest by a South African against England. South Africa won the Test by 168 runs, it was Taylor's first victory as captain and as a Test player. He followed that in the second Test with scores of 9 and 68 as England narrowly won by one wicket. In the third Test at Durban he was moved back up to open the innings, he scored 91 and shared 110 with Bob Catterall. The third day's play was washed out leaving the draw inevitable in a four-day match. The fourth Test was also drawn, Taylor scored 11 at number four and then moved back as the opener in the second innings made 101. Wisden wrote: "Taylor, who hit out freely when fear of defeat had gone, played a masterly game, but he had a little luck". With the series still level at 1–1, the fifth and final Test was made Timeless to ensure a winner of the series. England's C. A. G. Russell scored two centuries in the match and South Africa were set a target fourth innings target of 344. Taylor, at number four, batted for four and a half hours over an innings of 102 however he received little support from his teammates and South Africa lost by 109 runs. Taylor finished the series with 582 runs at 64.66 and was the highest scorer on either side, his total was 278 more than the next South African. His series total was at the time a Test record for a captain, later surpassed by Don Bradman in 1936. His three centuries in the series set a South African Test record which was only bettered in 2003/04 by Jacques Kallis. The Wisden report of the series recorded that "H. W. Taylor as a batsman was in a class by himself". The series cemented Taylor's position as a leading batsman in the world.

With Faulkner retiring in 1924, the South Africans, who had only two quality players in Taylor and Cattrell, underwent somewhat of a barren period in the 1920s. However, the emergence of a new generation of South African cricketers, more so in their batting than in their bowling, in the 1930s such as Bruce Mitchell, Xen Balaskas, Ken Viljoen, Dudley Nourse, Eric Rowan, Alan Melville, Pieter van der Bijl, and Ronnie Grieveson once again ensured that South Africa became a top-quality international team. The team's leading batsmen during this era were Mitchell, Nourse, Rowan, Melville, and van der Bijl. Nourse, in particular, became famous for his hand-eye coordination and his excellent fielding, one of many to be produced by South Africa in the coming decades; natural skills which were according to legend inspired and developed by his father Dave's refusal to coach him as a youngster, demanding that he learned the rudiments of the game on his own, as he himself had. This South African team was also distinct from past South African teams in one respect: whereas the previous teams had been composed entirely of British-origin players, this team had Afrikaners like van der Bijl and Greeks such as Balaskas, regarded by wide consensus to be the greatest Greek cricketer ever.

=== The post-war years ===
The South African cricket team toured England in 1947. At Trent Bridge, Captain Alan Melville and vice-captain, Dudley Nourse achieved a Test match record for a third wicket partnership of 319. The following year Nourse, 38-year-old captain of Natal, was appointed Captain for the 1948 MCC Test matches in South Africa.

They continued to play regularly against England, Australia and New Zealand until 1970. The membership rules of the Imperial Cricket Conference (ICC) meant that when South Africa left the Commonwealth in May 1961, they also left the ICC. Despite the rules being changed in 1964 to allow other nations to be "Associate" members, South Africa did not reapply. Due to South African apartheid laws, which introduced legal racial segregation to the country in 1948, no non-white (defined under the legislation as either "black", "coloured" or "Indian") player was eligible to play Test cricket for South Africa.

=== The international ban ===
The anti-apartheid movement led the ICC to impose a moratorium on tours in 1970. This decision excluded players such as Graeme Pollock, Barry Richards and Mike Procter from international Test cricket for most of their careers. It would also cause the emigration of future stars such as Allan Lamb and Robin Smith, who both played for England, and Kepler Wessels, who initially played for Australia before returning to South Africa. World class cricketers of their day such as Clive Rice and Vintcent van der Bijl also never played Test cricket despite their strong first class records.

=== A rainbow nation ===
The ICC reinstated South Africa as a Test nation in 1991, and the team played its first sanctioned international match since 1970 (and its first-ever One-Day International) against India in Calcutta on 10 November 1991 losing by 3 wickets. South Africa's first Test match after re-admission was played against the West Indies in April 1992. The match was played in Bridgetown, Barbados and South Africa lost by 52 runs.

Since South Africa has been reinstated they have achieved mixed success and hosted the International Cricket Council Cricket World Cup in 2003. However, it is widely believed the sides containing the likes of Allan Donald, Shaun Pollock, Gary Kirsten, Jacques Kallis and Hansie Cronje grossly underachieved, gaining a reputation as "chokers", due to them reaching the semi-finals of the Cricket World Cup four times, but failing to progress into the finals. In the second part of the 1990s, South Africa had the highest winning percentage in ODIs of any team, but they were knocked out of the 1996 World Cup in the quarter-finals, and then were eliminated on countback after tying their semi-final against Australia in 1999.

Their most noted international win was their win in the inaugural Champions Trophy in 1998. The team also won Commonwealth Games Gold medal in 1998.

=== 21st century Proteas ===
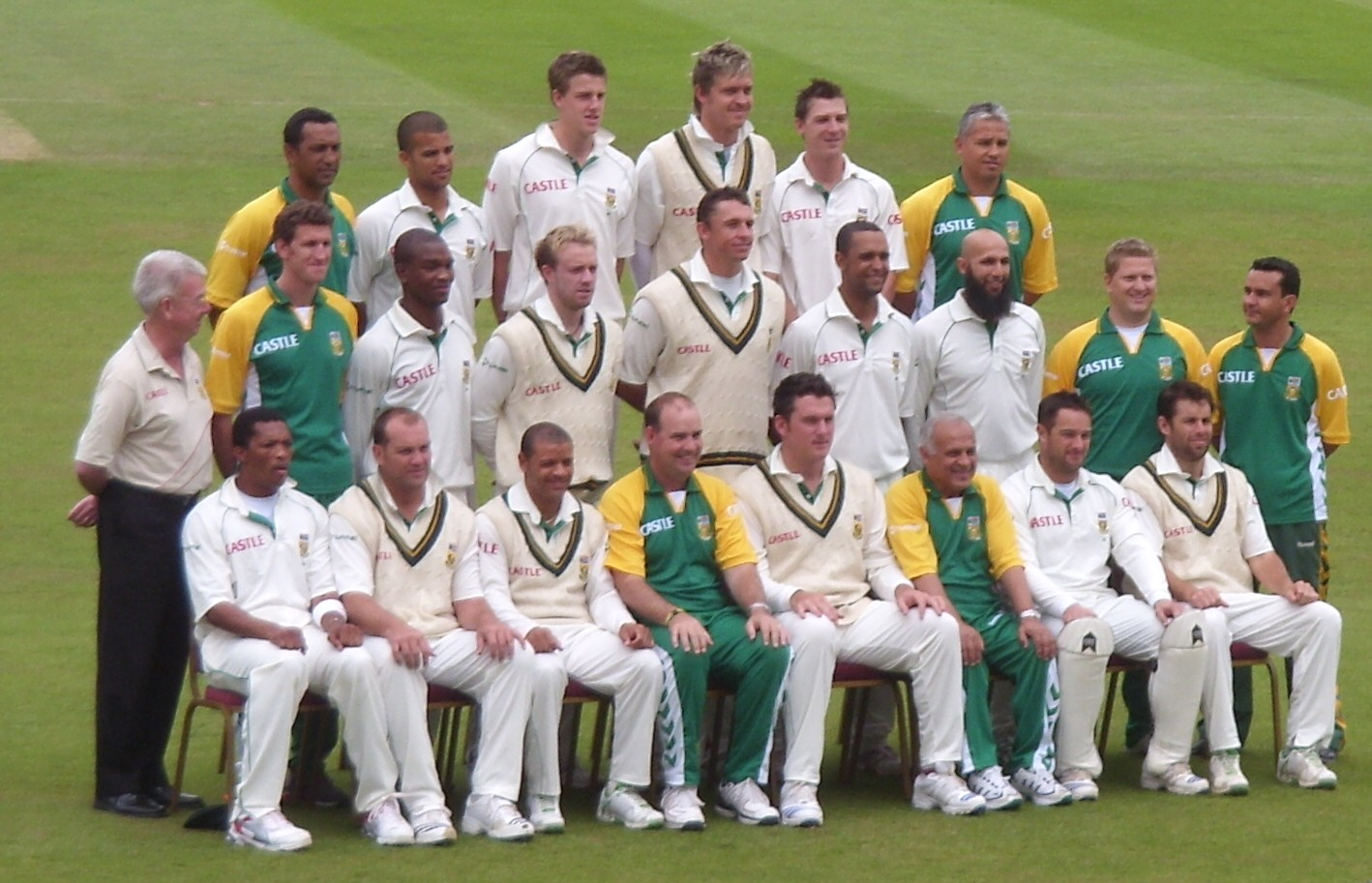
The South African team at The Oval in August 2008

In the 2003 World Cup, South Africa was one of the favourites but was eliminated by only one run in the group stages after they had mistakenly counted the number of runs they needed. They have also had bad press for failing in vital matches in global tournaments including the 2002 ICC Champions Trophy and the 2007 ICC World Twenty20.

With Donald retiring, Cronje banned for match-fixing and later killed in a plane crash, and Pollock also retiring from international cricket, the team once again changed shape. Graeme Smith was made captain, although following injuries to Smith and Jacques Kallis, Ashwell Prince deputised as Test captain on 12 July 2006. At the age of 29, he became the first non-white man to captain the once all-white South African cricket team. Although that racial quota policy, was rescinded in 2007, a new rule passed in 2016 stated that the team had to have an average minimum of six Black players, of which two must be Black African, in matches over the season.

With the addition of high-class players such as AB de Villiers and Hashim Amla, the South African Cricket team started rising in the ICC rankings. After many of the major players in the Australian side that had dominated the early 2000s had retired, the number one place in the ICC Test Championship was a wide-open race, with India and England having short stints as the number one side. South Africa toured England in 2012 for a three-Test series with the winner assured of being the world No. 1. South Africa went on to take the series comfortably 2–0 and claim the top spot in the rankings, a position they retained for over a full calendar year from 20 August 2012. Eight days later, on 28 August 2012, South Africa became the first team to top the rankings in all three formats of the game.

In February 2014 South Africa took on Australia in a Test series, with the winner being ranked No. 1 team in the world. Australia won the series 2–1. South Africa later in the year would regain the No. 1 ranking.

During this time of dominance in the Test arena, the ODI and T20I performances were far less consistent, as South Africa search for a winning formula ahead of the 2014 ICC World Twenty20 and the 2015 ICC Cricket World Cup. A notable ODI series loss to New Zealand at home in January 2013, and a further loss in Sri Lanka highlighted South Africa's recent difficulties. Exits from the 2012 ICC World Twenty20 and the 2013 ICC Champions Trophy only served to improve South Africa's reputation as 'chokers' in major tournaments. In the latter years of Smith's career, South Africa split the captaincy in the shorter forms of the game, with the ODI side being led by AB de Villiers and the T20I side by Faf du Plessis. After Smith's retirement, Hashim Amla was appointed captain of the test side, leading his side to victory in his first test in charge, in Galle in Sri Lanka.

== Tournaments ==
South Africa previously had a record of failing to win world cups and was much-maligned because of this. The 1992 Cricket World Cup, for example, featured a rain-affected semi-final played before the introduction of the Duckworth-Lewis rain rule. South Africa needed 22 runs from 13 balls when rain intervened. After the delay, they were left in the situation of requiring 22 runs from one ball to progress. In 1996 they were eliminated in the quarter-finals despite being one of the fancied teams and having qualified first in their group. In 1999 South Africa lost in the semi-final to eventual champions Australia. The match ended in a tie with both South Africa and Australia managing 213 but Australia advanced to the Final as Australia finished higher than South Africa in the group.

South Africa hosted the 2003 Cricket World Cup but failed to progress beyond the group stage due to a misunderstanding of how many runs they needed to score in a rain-affected run chase. As a result of this, Shaun Pollock resigned as captain and was replaced by young batsman Graeme Smith, although Pollock continued to play for the team. Under Smith's leadership, South Africa has achieved some success, although they were hampered by the retirements of many star players, including fast bowler Allan Donald and one-day specialist Jonty Rhodes.

In the 2007 Cricket World Cup they had a rollercoaster ride that included dominant wins over England, the West Indies, Ireland, Netherlands and Scotland, and a narrow win over Sri Lanka, but devastating losses to Australia, New Zealand and Bangladesh that cost them the No. 1 ranking. Then they bowed out in the semi-finals with their lowest ever score in a World Cup as Australia bowled them out for 149 and won by 7 wickets.

In the 2011 World Cup, South Africa topped Group B with the distinction of bowling out every side they played within the 50 overs, which also included a famous victory over hosts and eventual champions India. In the quarter-final, they were beaten by New Zealand after suffering a dramatic collapse and losing eight wickets for 64 runs. Even after many setbacks, their biggest heartbreak was awaiting them in the 2015 World cup semi-final where they lost to the tournament runners-up New Zealand in a rain-affected tie. Batting first South Africa posted 281–5 and set a revised target of 298 to New Zealand, thanks to an amazing batting performance by Faf du Plessis, David Miller and captain AB de Villiers. Chasing a mammoth target of 298 New Zealand got off to a flier inspired by their captain Brendon McCullum. But the real hero of the match was Grant Elliott, who scored 84* including a second-last ball six off the then world's best bowler Dale Steyn. This saw South Africa crash out of the 2015 World Cup despite playing some fantastic cricket throughout the entire tournament.

In the 2019 Cricket World Cup South Africa lost the opening match of the tournament to England and followed this up with losses to Bangladesh and India. Rained out against West Indies, they defeated Afghanistan but then lost to New Zealand and Pakistan, to end their chances of qualifying for the next stage. In the 2023 Cricket World Cup South Africa reached the semi-final but lost its match against Australia who went on to win the final.

They also hold the record of the highest successful run chase and made the highest total (the latter record has been surpassed) in One-Day Internationals (438–9 in 49.5 overs), in an iconic match against Australia on 12 March 2006. This game is considered by many to be the greatest One-Day International ever played.

In the 2024 ICC Men's T20 World Cup, South Africa reached the final unbeaten, with a resounding 9-wicket win over Afghanistan in a one-sided demolition. This was the first appearance in an World Cup final for the Proteas in any format. Ultimately, they lost to India by 7 runs. In 2025, South Africa beat Australia (the reigning champions) in the World Test Championship final, by 5 wickets, thereby becoming world Test champions.

== International grounds ==
Locations of all stadiums which have hosted an international cricket match within South Africa

== Tournament history ==
A red box around the year indicates tournaments played within South Africa

Key
| Champions |
| Runners-up |
| Semi-finals |

=== ICC ===
==== World Test Championship ====
| Year | League stage | | | | | | | | | | Final Host | Final | Final Position |
| Year | Pos | Matches | | | | | Ded | PC | Pts | PCT | Final Host | Final | Final Position |
| Year | Pos | P | W | L | D | T | Ded | PC | Pts | PCT | Final Host | Final | Final Position |
|---|---|---|---|---|---|---|---|---|---|---|---|---|---|
| 2019–21 | 5/9 | 13 | 5 | 8 | 0 | 0 | 6 | 600 | 264 | 44 | Rose Bowl, England | DNQ | 5th |
| 2021–23 | 3/9 | 15 | 8 | 6 | 1 | 0 | 0 | 180 | 100 | 55.6 | The Oval, England | DNQ | 3rd |
| 2023–25 | 1/9 | 13 | 9 | 3 | 1 | 0 | 0 | 144 | 100 | 69.44 | Lord's, England | Won | 1st |

==== ICC Cricket World Cup ====
World Cup record
| Host and Year | Round | Position | P | W | L | T | NR | Squad |
|---|---|---|---|---|---|---|---|---|
| (England) 1975 | Not eligible, South Africa were banned due to apartheid | | | | | | | |
| (England) 1979 | Not eligible, South Africa were banned due to apartheid | | | | | | | |
| (England) (Wales) 1983 | Not eligible, South Africa were banned due to apartheid | | | | | | | |
| (India) (Pakistan) 1987 | Not eligible, South Africa were banned due to apartheid | | | | | | | |
| (Australia) (New Zealand) 1992 | Semi-finals | 4/9 | 9 | 5 | 4 | 0 | 0 | Squad |
| (India) (Pakistan) (Sri Lanka) 1996 | Quarter-final | 5/12 | 6 | 5 | 1 | 0 | 0 | Squad |
| (England) (Wales) (Scotland) (Republic of Ireland) (Netherlands) 1999 | Semi-finals | 3/12 | 9 | 6 | 2 | 1 | 0 | Squad |
| (South Africa) (Zimbabwe) (Kenya) 2003 | Group stage | 9/14 | 6 | 3 | 2 | 0 | 1 | Squad |
| (Cricket West Indies) 2007 | Semi-finals | 4/16 | 10 | 6 | 4 | 0 | 0 | Squad |
| (India) (Sri Lanka) (Bangladesh) 2011 | Quarter-final | 5/14 | 7 | 5 | 2 | 0 | 0 | Squad |
| (Australia) (New Zealand) 2015 | Semi-finals | 4/14 | 8 | 5 | 3 | 0 | 0 | Squad |
| (England) (Wales) 2019 | Group stage | 7/10 | 9 | 3 | 5 | 0 | 1 | Squad |
| (India) 2023 | Semi-finals | 3/10 | 10 | 7 | 3 | 0 | 0 | Squad |
| (South Africa) (Zimbabwe) (Namibia) 2027 | Qualified as co-hosts | | | | | | | |
| (India) (Bangladesh) 2031 | TBD | | | | | | | |
| Total | 0 Titles | - | 74 | 45 | 26 | 1 | 2 | - |

==== T20 World Cup ====
T20 World Cup record
| Host and Year | Round | Position | P | W | L | T | NR | Squad |
|---|---|---|---|---|---|---|---|---|
| (South Africa) 2007 | Super 8s | 5/12 | 5 | 4 | 1 | 0 | 0 | Squad |
| (England) 2009 | Semi-finals | 3/12 | 6 | 5 | 1 | 0 | 0 | Squad |
| (Cricket West Indies) 2010 | Super 8s | 7/12 | 5 | 2 | 3 | 0 | 0 | Squad |
| (Sri Lanka) 2012 | Super 8s | 8/12 | 5 | 2 | 3 | 0 | 0 | Squad |
| (Bangladesh) 2014 | Semi-finals | 4/16 | 5 | 3 | 2 | 0 | 0 | Squad |
| (India) 2016 | Super 10s | 5/16 | 4 | 2 | 2 | 0 | 0 | Squad |
| (United Arab Emirates) (Oman) 2021 | Super 12s | 5/16 | 5 | 4 | 1 | 0 | 0 | Squad |
| (Australia) 2022 | Super 12s | 6/16 | 5 | 2 | 2 | 1 | 0 | Squad |
| (Cricket West Indies) (United States) 2024 | Runners-up | 2/20 | 9 | 8 | 1 | 0 | 0 | Squad |
| (India) (Sri Lanka) 2026 | Semi-finals | 3/20 | 8 | 6 | 1 | 1 | 0 | Squad |
| (Australia) (New Zealand) 2028 | TBD | | | | | | | |
| (England) (Wales) (Scotland) (Republic of Ireland) 2030 | TBD | | | | | | | |
| Total | 0 Titles | - | 49 | 32 | 16 | 0 | 1 | - |

==== Champions Trophy ====
Champions Trophy record
| Host and Year | Round | Position | P | W | L | T | NR | Squad |
|---|---|---|---|---|---|---|---|---|
| (Bangladesh) 1998 | Champions | 1/9 | 3 | 3 | 0 | 0 | 0 | Squad |
| (Kenya) 2000 | Semi-finals | 4/11 | 2 | 1 | 1 | 0 | 0 | Squad |
| (Sri Lanka) 2002 | Semi-finals | 4/12 | 3 | 2 | 1 | 0 | 0 | Squad |
| (England) 2004 | Group stage | 6/12 | 2 | 1 | 1 | 0 | 0 | Squad |
| (India) 2006 | Semi-finals | 3/12 | 4 | 2 | 2 | 0 | 0 | Squad |
| (South Africa) 2009 | Group stage | 7/8 | 3 | 1 | 2 | 0 | 0 | Squad |
| (England) (Wales) 2013 | Semi-final | 4/8 | 4 | 1 | 2 | 1 | 0 | Squad |
| (England) (Wales) 2017 | Group stage | 5/8 | 3 | 1 | 2 | 0 | 0 | Squad |
| (Pakistan) (United Arab Emirates) 2025 | Semi-final | 3/8 | 4 | 2 | 1 | 0 | 1 | Squad |
| (India) 2029 | TBD | | | | | | | |
| Total | 1 Titles | - | 28 | 14 | 12 | 1 | 1 | - |

=== Other ===
==== Commonwealth Games ====
Commonwealth Games record
| Year | Round | Position | P | W | L | T | NR | Squad |
|---|---|---|---|---|---|---|---|---|
| (Malaysia) 1998 | Champions | 1/16 | 5 | 5 | 0 | 0 | 0 | Squad |
| Total | 1 Title | - | 5 | 5 | 0 | 0 | 0 | - |

== Honours ==
=== ICC ===
Titles

- World Test Championship
  - Champions (1): 2023–2025
- T20 World Cup
  - Runners-up (1): 2024
- Champions Trophy
  - Champions (1): 1998

Awards

- ICC Test Championship
  - Winners (3): 2013–2015
- ICC ODI Championship
  - Winners (2): 2008, 2009

=== Multi-sport event ===
- Commonwealth Games
  - Gold medal (1): 1998

=== Perpetual Trophies ===
- Sir Vivian Richards Trophy (v West Indies)
  - Winners (9): 1998/99, 2000/01, 2003/04, 2004/05, 2007/08, 2010, 2014/15, 2021, 2022/23,
- Basil D'Oliveira Trophy (v England)
  - Winners (2): 2008, 2012
- Gandhi-Mandela Trophy (v India)
  - Winners (2): 2017/18, 2021/22

== Team colours ==
| Period | Kit manufacturer | Shirt sponsor |
|---|---|---|
| 1992–1996 | ISC | No sponsor |
| 1997–2001 | Adidas | Castle |
| ICC Cricket World Cup 1999 | Asics | Standard Bank |
| 2001–2005 | Admiral | Castle |
| 2005–2008 | Hummel | Castle |
| 2005–2008 | Hummel | Standard Bank |
| 2008–2011 | Reebok | Castle |
| 2011–2015 | Adidas | Standard Bank |
| 2011–2015 | Adidas | Castle |
| 2016–2021 | New Balance | Standard Bank |
| 2016–2021 | New Balance | No sponsor |
| 2021–2023 | Castore | No sponsor |
| ICC Men's Cricket World Cup 2023 | Lotto | Amul |
| 2023–2025 | Lotto | Royal Green Spirits |
| 2025–2027 | Macron | Suzuki |

South Africa's kits are manufactured by Macron, who replaced the previous manufacturer Lotto in 2025. When playing Test cricket, South Africa's cricket whites feature the king protea badge (the emblem of the South African Sports Commission) with the South African flag above it on the left breast of the shirt. South African fielders may wear a green cap or a white sun hat with the king protea badge in the middle. Helmets are also coloured green. Before 1996, the cap insignia was the United Cricket Board of South Africa old badge, which was a circle with a ball superimposed over a wicket in the centre and the inscription which reads "UNITED CRICKET BOARD OF SOUTH AFRICA" around the circle's border. Before 1991, the cap insignia was a springbok head under the inscription "S.A.C.B" in yellow letters (which changed to "S.A." with the years of the tour, for instance, "S.A. 1982–83").

In limited overs cricket, South Africa's ODI and Twenty20 shirts feature the king protea badge with the national flag on the left breast of the shirt.

In ODIs, the kit comprises a green shirt with yellow accents and dark green stylised protea leaves and green trousers, whilst the Twenty20 kit comprises a green shirt with a yellow gradient and the Oxygen logo in the front and green trousers. In both uniforms, the fielding hat is a green baseball cap with white piping and a yellow line on the visor border or a green sunhat, which are both green with the king protea badge.

In ICC limited-overs tournaments, a modified kit design is used with the sponsor's logos moving to the sleeve and 'South Africa' printed across the front.

Since 2016, South Africa played some matches with an all-pink version of its uniform, to raise breast cancer awareness.

Previous suppliers were ISC (1992–1996), Asics (1999), Admiral (2000–2003), Hummel (2004–2007), Adidas (2011–2015), New Balance (2016–2021) and Castore (2021–2023).

Until 2016, the sponsor was Castle Lager. During the 2003–04 tour of Pakistan, the Castle Lager logo was replaced by "Charles".

== Current squad ==
For the 2024–25 period, CSA awarded 18 players national contracts, from which selectors choose the core of the Test, One-Day, and Twenty20 International teams. Non-contracted players remain eligible for selection and can be upgraded to a Cricket South Africa contract if they gain regular selection.

This is a list of every active player who is contracted to Cricket South Africa, has played for South Africa since November 2024 or was named in the recent Test, ODI or T20I squads. Uncapped players are listed in italics.

Last updated: 8 November 2025

- Forms – This refers to the forms they've played for South Africa in the past year, not over their whole South Africa career
- C – Contracted to Cricket South Africa (Y = Holds contract)
- S/N – Shirt number

| Name | Age | Batting style | Bowling style | Domestic team | SA20 Team | Forms | C | S/N | Captain | Last Test | Last ODI | Last T20I |
Batters
| Temba Bavuma | 36 | Right-handed | Right-arm medium | Lions | —N/a | Test, ODI | Y | 11 | Test, ODI (C) | (Australia) 2025 | (England) 2025 | (Australia) 2023 |
| David Bedingham | 32 | Right-handed | —N/a | Western Province | Sunrisers Eastern Cape | Test | —N/a | 5 | | (Zimbabwe) 2025 | —N/a | —N/a |
| Matthew Breetzke | 28 | Right-handed | —N/a | Warriors | Durban's Super Giants | Test, ODI, T20I | —N/a | 35 | | (Zimbabwe) 2025 | (Pakistan) 2025 | (Pakistan) 2025 |
| Dewald Brevis | 23 | Right-handed | Right-arm leg break | Titans | Pretoria Capitals | Test, ODI, T20I | Y | 52 | | (Pakistan) 2025 | (England) 2025 | (Pakistan) 2025 |
| Tony de Zorzi | 29 | Left-handed | —N/a | Western Province | —N/a | Test, ODI, T20I | Y | 33 | | (Pakistan) 2025 | (Pakistan) 2025 | (Pakistan) 2025 |
| Zubayr Hamza | 31 | Right-handed | Right-arm leg break | Lions | —N/a | Test | —N/a | 39 | | (New Zealand) 2024 | (Netherlands) 2021 | —N/a |
| Reeza Hendricks | 37 | Right-handed | Right-arm off break | Lions | MI Cape Town | T20I | Y | 17 | | —N/a | (Ireland) 2024 | (Pakistan) 2025 |
| David Miller | 37 | Left-handed | —N/a | Dolphins | Paarl Royals | T20I | Y | 10 | T20I (VC) | —N/a | (New Zealand) 2025 | (Pakistan) 2024 |
| Tristan Stubbs | 26 | Right-handed | Right-arm off break | Warriors | Sunrisers Eastern Cape | Test, ODI, T20I | Y | 30 | | (Pakistan) 2025 | (England) 2025 | (England) 2025 |
| Rassie van der Dussen | 37 | Right-handed | Right-arm leg break | Lions | MI Cape Town | ODI, T20I | Y | 72 | | (Australia) 2022 | (New Zealand) 2025 | (Australia) 2025 |
All-rounders
| Corbin Bosch | 32 | Right-handed | Right-arm fast-medium | Titans | —N/a | Test, ODI, T20I | —N/a | 37 | | (Zimbabwe) 2025 | (Pakistan) 2025 | (Pakistan) 2025 |
| Donovan Ferreira | 28 | Right-handed | Right arm off break | Titans | Joburg Super Kings | ODI, T20I | —N/a | 55 | | —N/a | (Pakistan) 2025 | (Pakistan) 2025 |
| Marco Jansen | 26 | Right-handed | Left-arm fast | Warriors | Sunrisers Eastern Cape | Test, ODI, T20I | Y | 70 | | (Pakistan) 2025 | (New Zealand) 2025 | (England) 2025 |
| George Linde | 34 | Left-handed | Left-arm orthodox | Western Province | MI Cape Town | ODI, T20I | —N/a | 27 | | (Pakistan) 2021 | (Pakistan) 2025 | (Pakistan) 2025 |
| Aiden Markram | 32 | Right-handed | Right arm off break | Titans | Sunrisers Eastern Cape | Test, ODI, T20I | Y | 4 | T20I (C); Test, ODI (VC) | (Pakistan) 2025 | (England) 2025 | (England) 2025 |
| Wiaan Mulder | 28 | Right-handed | Right-arm medium | Lions | Durban's Super Giants | Test, ODI | —N/a | 24 | | (Pakistan) 2025 | (England) 2025 | (Ireland) 2024 |
| Senuran Muthusamy | 32 | Left-handed | Left-arm orthodox | Lions | Pretoria Capitals | Test, ODI, T20I | —N/a | 67 | | (India) 2025 | (England) 2025 | (Australia) 2025 |
| Andile Phehlukwayo | 30 | Left-handed | Right-arm medium-fast | Dolphins | Paarl Royals | —N/a | Y | 23 | | (India) 2018 | (Pakistan) 2024 | (Cricket West Indies) 2024 |
Wicket-keepers
| Quinton de Kock | 33 | Left-handed | —N/a | Lions | Durban's Super Giants | ODI, T20I | Y | 12 | | (India) 2021 | (Pakistan) 2025 | (Pakistan) 2025 |
| Rubin Hermann | 29 | Left-handed | —N/a | North West | Paarl Royals | ODI | —N/a | 83 | | —N/a | (Pakistan) 2025 | (Namibia) 2025 |
| Lhuan-dre Pretorius | 20 | Left-handed | —N/a | Titans | Paarl Royals | Test, ODI, T20I | Y | 80 | | (Zimbabwe) 2025 | (Pakistan) 2025 | (Pakistan) 2025 |
| Sinethemba Qeshile | 27 | Right-handed | —N/a | Warriors | —N/a | ODI | —N/a | 19 | | —N/a | (Pakistan) 2025 | (Sri Lanka) 2019 |
| Ryan Rickelton | 30 | Left-handed | —N/a | Lions | MI Cape Town | Test, ODI, T20I | Y | 44 | | (Pakistan) 2025 | (England) 2025 | (England) 2025 |
| Kyle Verreynne | 29 | Right-handed | —N/a | Western Province | Pretoria Capitals | Test, ODI | —N/a | 97 | | (Pakistan) 2025 | (Pakistan) 2025 | —N/a |
Spin bowlers
| Bjorn Fortuin | 32 | Right-handed | Left-arm orthodox | Lions | Paarl Royals | ODI, T20I | Y | 77 | | —N/a | (Pakistan) 2025 | (Namibia) 2025 |
| Simon Harmer | 37 | Right-handed | Right arm off break | Titans | —N/a | Test | —N/a | 47 | | (Pakistan) 2025 | —N/a | —N/a |
| Keshav Maharaj | 36 | Right-handed | Left-arm orthodox | Dolphins | Durban's Super Giants | Test, ODI | Y | 16 | | (Pakistan) 2025 | (England) 2025 | (India) 2024 |
| Nqaba Peter | 24 | Right-handed | Right-arm leg break | —N/a | Paarl Royals | ODI, T20I | —N/a | 91 | | —N/a | (Pakistan) 2025 | (Australia) 2025 |
| Tabraiz Shamsi | 36 | Right-handed | Left-arm unorthodox | Titans | Joburg Super Kings | ODI | Y | 26 | | (Sri Lanka) 2018 | (Pakistan) 2025 | (India) 2024 |
Seam bowlers
| Ottneil Baartman | 33 | Right-handed | Right-arm fast-medium | Dolphins | Paarl Royals | ODI, T20I | —N/a | 41 | | —N/a | (Pakistan) 2024 | (Pakistan) 2025 |
| Nandre Burger | 31 | Left-handed | Left-arm fast-medium | Western Province | Joburg Super Kings | ODI, T20I | Y | 71 | | (Cricket West Indies) 2024 | (Pakistan) 2025 | (Pakistan) 2025 |
| Gerald Coetzee | 26 | Right-handed | Right-arm fast | Titans | Joburg Super Kings | ODI, T20I | Y | 62 | | (Sri Lanka) 2024 | (Australia) 2023 | (Namibia) 2025 |
| Kwena Maphaka | 20 | Left-handed | Left-arm fast | Lions | Paarl Royals | Test, ODI, T20I | —N/a | 81 | | (Zimbabwe) 2025 | (Australia) 2025 | (England) 2025 |
| Lungi Ngidi | 30 | Right-handed | Right-arm fast-medium | Titans | Paarl Royals | Test, ODI, T20I | Y | 22 | | (Australia) 2025 | (Pakistan) 2025 | (Pakistan) 2025 |
| Kagiso Rabada | 31 | Left-handed | Right-arm fast | Lions | MI Cape Town | Test, ODI, T20I | Y | 25 | | (Pakistan) 2025 | (New Zealand) 2025 | (England) 2025 |
| Andile Simelane | 23 | Right-handed | Right-arm fast | Dolphins | Sunrisers Eastern Cape | T20I | —N/a | 99 | | —N/a | —N/a | (Pakistan) 2025 |
| Lizaad Williams | 33 | Left-handed | Right-arm medium-fast | Titans | Joburg Super Kings | ODI, T20I | —N/a | 6 | | (Bangladesh) 2022 | (Pakistan) 2025 | (Pakistan) 2025 |

== Coaching staff ==
| Position | Name |
|---|---|
| Director of cricket | Enoch Nkwe |
| Head coach | Shukri Conrad |
| Batting coach | |
| Bowling coach | Piet Botha (Test) |
| Fielding coach | |

=== Coaching history ===
- 1991–1994: Mike Procter
- 1994–1999: Bob Woolmer
- 1999–2002: Graham Ford
- 2002–2004: Eric Simons
- 2004–2005: Ray Jennings
- 2005–2010: Mickey Arthur
- 2010–2011: Corrie van Zyl
- 2011–2013: Gary Kirsten
- 2012–2013: Gary Kirsten (Test, ODI) and Russell Domingo (T20I)
- 2013–2017: Russell Domingo
- 2017–2019: Ottis Gibson
- 2019–2022: Mark Boucher
- 2022–2023: Malibongwe Maketa (interim)
- 2023–2025: Shukri Conrad (Test) and Rob Walter (ODI, T20I)
- 2025–present: Shukri Conrad

== See also ==
- Cricket in South Africa
- South Africa women's national cricket team
- History of Test cricket from 1884 to 1889
- History of Test cricket from 1890 to 1900
- International cricket in South Africa from 1971 to 1981

| Preceded by Australia; England | Test match playing teams 12 March 1889 | Succeeded by West Indies |
