= 2025–26 CSA T20 Knock-Out Competition =

Cricket tournament

- Dates: 24 October – 24 November 2025
- Administrator: Cricket South Africa
- Cricket format: Twenty20
- Tournament format(s): Round-robin and knockout
- Host: South Africa
- Champions: Knights (2nd title)
- Runners-up: Border
- Participants: 7
- Matches: 25
- Most runs: George Van Heerden (237)
- Most wickets: Alindile Mhletywa (15)

The 2025–26 CSA T20 Knock-Out Competition was the 6th season of the CSA Provincial T20 Cup, organized by Cricket South Africa in South Africa. The tournament ran from 24 October to 24 November 2025, the date of the final. Tuskers were the defending champion.

this edition is the final CSA T20 Knock-Out Competition tournament. It was replaced in 2026 by the Pro20 Cup.

== Teams and squads ==
Border	Easterns Storm	Knights	Limpopo Impalas	Mpumalanga Rhinos	Northern Cape Heat	South Western Districts
Head Coaches
Tumelo Bodibe	Geoffrey Toyana	JP Triegaardt	Gurshwin Rabie	Mbasa Gqadushe	Mduduzi Mbatha	Letlotle Sesele
Captains
Jason Niemand	Grant Thomas		Michael Erlank	Muhammed Mayet	Ruan Haasbroek	Yaseen Valli
Players

== Standings ==
Pos	Team	Pld	W	L	NR	Pts	NRR	Qualification
1	Knights	6	4	1	1	20	2.023	Advance to Qualifier 1
2	Border	6	4	1	1	19	1.117	Advance to Qualifier 1
3	South Western Districts	6	3	2	1	14	0.481	Advance to Eliminator
4	Mpumalanga	6	2	2	2	12	−0.330	Advance to Eliminator
5	Easterns	6	2	3	1	10	0.017	
6	Limpopo	6	1	4	1	6	−1.295	
7	Northern Cape	6	0	3	3	6	−3.100	

Source: ESPNcricinfo, SuperSport

== Fixtures ==
Match 1
24 October 2025
13:00
Scorecard

Knights; 223/4 (20 overs)	v	Northern Cape; 130 (18.5 overs)
Rilee Rossouw 97 (46); Benjamin Van Rensburg 2/36 (4 overs)		Garnett Tarr 48 (30); Sisanda Magala 2/12 (1.5 overs)

Knights won by 93 runs
De Beers Diamond Oval, Kimberley
Umpires: Jan Erasmus and Siphelele Gasa

- Knights won the toss and elected to bat.
- Liam Doherty, Ethan Frosler, Abel Mokwena and Ruan van Rooyen (Northern Cape) all made their T20 debuts.
- Points: Knights 5, Northern Cape 0

Match 2
25 October 2025
13:00
Scorecard

Limpopo; 160/4 (20 overs)	v	South Western Districts; 164/2 (18.2 overs)
Liam Peters 45 (35); Banele Cele 1/18 (2 overs)		Heath Richards 67* (55); Matt Hollard 1/31 (3 overs)

South Western Districts won by 8 wickets
Cricket Club Ground, Polokwane
Umpires: Khawulani Ntuli and Jurie Sadler

- Limpopo won the toss and elected to bat.
- Shelton Ngobeni, Richard Williams (Limpopo), Nathan Engelbrecht and Zack Momberg (South Western Districts) all made their T20 debuts.
- Points: South Western Districts 4, Limpopo 0

Match 3
26 October 2025
13:00
Scorecard

Mpumalanga; 127/2 (13.1 overs)	v	Border
Zakir Kathrada 68 (42); Alindile Mhletywa 1/25 (2.1 overs)

No result
Buffalo Park, East London
Umpires: Bongani Ntshebe and Evan van der Merwe

- Border won the toss and elected to field.
- No further play was possible due to rain.
- Christiaan du Toit (Border) and B Brokensha (Mpumalanga) both made their T20 debuts.
- Points: Border 2, Mpumalanga 2

Match 4
29 October 2025
13:00
Scorecard

South Western Districts; 160/6 (20 overs)	v	Border; 162/4 (17.4 overs)
Ruan Terblanche 57 (33); Alindile Mhletywa 2/35 (4 overs)		Jerome Bossr 53 (32); Liam Alder 2/38 (4 overs)

Border won by 6 wickets
Recreation Ground, Oudtshoorn
Umpires: Marais Erasmus and Willhelm Nell

- South Western Districts won the toss and elected to bat.
- Points: Border 4, South Western Districts 0

Match 5
29 October 2025
13:00
Scorecard

Knights; 199/4 (20 overs)	v	Limpopo; 100 (14.5 overs)
Rilee Rossouw 83* (36); Irvin Modimokoane 2/34 (4 overs)		Christoffel Klijnhans 30 (21); Ross Boast 5/12 (2.5 overs)

Knights won by 99 runs
Mangaung Oval, Bloemfontein
Umpires: Roger Burne and Waldo Lategan

- Limpopo won the toss and elected to field.
- Ross Boast (Knights), Thabo Mosefowa and Natasha Ngobeni (Limpopo) all made their T20 debuts.
- Ross Boast (Knights) took his maiden five-wicket haul in T20s.
- Points: Knights 5, Limpopo 0

Match 6
29 October 2025
13:00
Scorecard

Easterns; 103 (14.1 overs)	v	Northern Cape
Brayden Hicks 46 (24); Benjamin Van Rensburg 3/25 (3 overs)

No result
Willowmoore Park, Benoni
Umpires: Stacy Lackay and Godwin Von Willingh

- Northern Cape won the toss and elected to field.
- No further play was possible due to rain.
- Brayden Hicks (Easterns) made his T20 debut.
- Points: Easterns 2, Northern Cape 2

Match 7
1 November 2025
13:00
Scorecard

Knights; 110/7 (20 overs)	v	Border; 113/6 (16.1 overs)
Cole Abrahams 31 (29); Alindile Mhletywa 2/18 (4 overs)		Wian Ruthven 37 (29); Dane Piedt 3/15 (4 overs)

Border won by 4 wickets
Buffalo Park, East London
Umpires: Gladman Gaseba and Mthokozisi Shezi

- Border won the toss and elected to field.
- Wian Ruthven, Thozama Totana (Border) and Ruben du Toit (Knights) all made their T20 debuts.
- Points: Border 5, Knights 0

Match 8
1 November 2025
13:00
Scorecard

Mpumalanga; 116/7 (20 overs)	v	Easterns; 116 (19.4 overs)
Zakir Kathrada 37 (27); Amaan Khan 4/28 (4 overs)		Brayden Hicks 49 (21); B Brokensha 5/12 (4 overs)

Match tied
(Mpumalanga won the Super Over)
Uplands College, White River
Umpires: Evan van der Merwe and Godwin Von Willingh

- Mpumalanga won the toss and elected to bat.
- Ricus Kramm (Mpumalanga) made his T20 debut.
- B Brokensha (Mpumalanga) took his maiden five-wicket haul in T20s.
- Super Over: Easterns 5/2, Mpumalanga 6/0
- Points: Mpumalanga 4, Easterns 0

Match 9
2 November 2025
13:00
Scorecard

South Western Districts; 164/4 (20 overs)	v	Northern Cape; 140 (18.3 overs)
George Van Heerden 63* (41); Romano Terblanche 2/34 (4 overs)		Liam Doherty 50 (32); Mondli Khumalo 3/20 (3.3 overs)

South Western Districts won by 24 runs
De Beers Diamond Oval, Kimberley
Umpires: Stephen Harris and Heinrich Killian

- South Western Districts won the toss and elected to bat.
- Points: South Western Districts 4, Northern Cape 0

Match 10
3 November 2025
13:00
Scorecard

Easterns; 137/8 (20 overs)	v	Border; 138/5 (18 overs)
Jurie Snyman 56 (39); Thozama Totana 2/21 (4 overs)		Wian Ruthven 40 (27); Andrew Rasemene 2/29 (4 overs)

Border won by 5 wickets
Willowmoore Park, Benoni
Umpires: Jan Erasmus and Keagan Williams

- Easterns won the toss and elected to bat.
- Mekyle Pillay (Easterns) made his T20 debut.
- Points: Border 4, Easterns 0

Match 11
5 November 2025
13:00
Scorecard

Limpopo	v	Northern Cape

Match abandoned
Cricket Club Ground, Polokwane

- No toss.
- No play was possible due to rain.
- Points: Limpopo 2, Northern Cape 2

Match 12
5 November 2025
13:00
Scorecard

Mpumalanga; 179/6 (20 overs)	v	Knights; 182/6 (19.5 overs)
Gareth Dukes 47 (24); Malusi Siboto 2/31 (4 overs)		Ruan Haasbroek 76* (36); Gareth Dukes 2/30 (4 overs)

Knights won by 4 wickets
Uplands College, White River
Umpires: Gladman Gaseba and Kerrin Klaaste

- Knights won the toss and elected to field.
- Points: Knights 4, Mpumalanga 0

Match 13
8 November 2025
13:00
Scorecard

Mpumalanga; 124/7 (20 overs)	v	South Western Districts; 128/5 (16.1 overs)
Hermann Rolfes 42 (41); Liam Alder 3/26 (4 overs)		Nathan Engelbrecht 28 (23); Aubrey Swanepoel 2/14 (2 overs)

South Western Districts won by 5 wickets
Recreation Ground, Oudtshoorn
Umpires: Stacy Lackay and Willhelm Nell

- South Western Districts won the toss and elected to field.
- Points: South Western Districts 4, Mpumalanga 0

Match 14
8 November 2025
13:00
Scorecard

Limpopo; 158/7 (20 overs)	v	Border; 130 (19.1 overs)
Tylor Trenoweth 60 (36); Thozama Totana 3/30 (4 overs)		Michael Copeland 41 (29); Irvin Modimokoane 3/27 (4 overs)

Limpopo won by 28 runs
Cricket Club Ground, Polokwane
Umpires: Roger Burne and Khawulani Ntuli

- Border won the toss and elected to field.
- Kyle Landsberg, Tylor Trenoweth (Limpopo) and Lihle Sizani (Border) all made their T20 debuts.
- Points: Limpopo 4, Border -1

Match 15
9 November 2025
13:00
Scorecard

Knights; 114/0 (11.1 overs)	v	Easterns; 69/5 (6 overs)
Gihahn Cloete 57* (78)		Grant Thomson 24* (10); Sisanda Magala 4/12 (2 overs)

Knights won by 8 runs (DLS method)
Mangaung Oval, Bloemfontein
Umpires: Heinrich Killian and Mthokozisi Shezi

- Easterns won the toss and elected to field.
- Play was stopped in the first innings at 11.1 overs due to rain.
- Easterns were set a revised target of 78 runs in 6 overs due to rain.
- Kaylan Archary (Easterns) made his T20 debut.
- Points: Knights 4, Easterns 0

Match 16
12 November 2025
13:00
Scorecard

South Western Districts; 176/6 (20 overs)	v	Easterns; 179/4 (19.1 overs)
Yaseen Valli 42 (30); Ernest Kemm 2/24 (3 overs)		Brayden Hicks 69* (43); Jade Richter 2/26 (4 overs)

Easterns won by 6 wickets
Recreation Ground, Oudtshoorn
Umpires: Kerrin Klaaste and Keagan Williams

- Easterns won the toss and elected to field.
- Jade Richter (South Western Districts) made his T20 debut.
- Points: Easterns 4, South Western Districts 0

Match 17
12 November 2025
13:00
Scorecard

Border; 184/4 (20 overs)	v	Northern Cape; 115/8 (20 overs)
Jason Niemand 63* (42); Ruan van Rooyen 1/27 (4 overs)		Ronan Herrmann 24 (22); Thando Ntini 2/16 (4 overs)

Border won by 69 runs
Buffalo Park, East London
Umpires: Waldo Lategan and Bongani Ntshebe

- Northern Cape won the toss and elected to field.
- Points: Border 5, Northern Cape 0

Match 18
12 November 2025
13:00
Scorecard

Mpumalanga; 123 (19.4 overs)	v	Limpopo; 114/8 (20 overs)
Hermann Rolfes 28 (24); Emmanuel Motswiri 4/27 (3.4 overs)		Tylor Trenoweth 25 (26); Jon Hinrichsen 2/13 (4 overs)

Mpumalanga won by 9 runs
Uplands College, White River
Umpires: Jan Erasmus and Muhammad Jooma

- Mpumalanga won the toss and elected to bat.
- Points: Mpumalanga 4, Limpopo 0

Match 19
15 November 2025
13:00
Scorecard

Knights	v	South Western Districts

Match abandoned
Mangaung Oval, Bloemfontein

- No toss.
- No play was possible due to rain.
- Points: Knights 2, South Western Districts 2

Match 20
15 November 2025
13:00
Scorecard

Northern Cape	v	Mpumalanga

Match abandoned
De Beers Diamond Oval, Kimberley

- No toss.
- No play was possible due to rain.
- Points: Northern Cape 2, Mpumalanga 2

Match 21
15 November 2025
13:00
Scorecard

Limpopo; 97/7 (17 overs)	v	Easterns; 58/2 (6.1 overs)
Emmanuel Motswiri 28 (32); Tumelo Simelane 3/13 (4 overs)		Christopher Britz 22* (17); Don Radebe 2/15 (2 overs)

Easterns won by 8 wickets (DLS method)
Willowmoore Park, Benoni
Umpires: Mthokozisi Shezi and Keagan Williams

- Easterns won the toss and elected to field.
- Play was stopped in the first innings at 17 overs due to rain.
- Easterns were set a revised target of 57 runs in 8 overs due to rain.
- Points: Easterns 4, Limpopo 0

== Playoffs ==
Qualifier 1 / Eliminator
18 November 2025
1	Knights	76/2 (11.4 overs)
2	Border	140/7 (20 overs)
19 November 2025
3	South Western Districts	152/6 (20 overs)
4	Mpumalanga	109 (19.2 overs)

Qualifier 2
21 November 2025
Q1L	Border	155/4 (20 overs)
EW	South Western Districts	130 (20 overs)

Final
23–24 November 2025
Q1W	Knights	155/7 (20 overs)
Q2W	Border	144/6 (20 overs)

=== Qualifier 1 ===
18 November 2025
13:00
Scorecard

Knights; 140/7 (20 overs)	v	Border; 76/2 (11.4 overs)
Jan Coetzer 33* (24); Mbongiseni Mhlanga 3/20 (4 overs)		Jacques Snyman 36 (24); Thozama Totana 1/6 (3 overs)

Knights won by 3 runs (DLS method)
Mangaung Oval, Bloemfontein
Umpires: Waldo Lategan and Khawulani Ntuli

- Knights won the toss and elected to field.
- Rain prevented any further play.
- Knights were 3 runs ahead of the DLS par score when rain interrupted the match.

=== Eliminator ===
19 November 2025
13:00
Scorecard

South Western Districts; 152/6 (20 overs)	v	Mpumalanga; 109 (19.2 overs)
Ruan Terblanche 50 (29); Hermann Rolfes 2/23 (4 overs)		Jon Hinrichsen 23 (9); Liam Alder 3/7 (4 overs)

South Western Districts won by 43 runs
Recreation Ground, Oudtshoorn
Umpires: Kerrin Klaaste and Mthokozisi Shezi

- Mpumalanga won the toss and elected to field.

=== Qualifier 2 ===
21 November 2025
13:00
Scorecard

Border; 155/4 (20 overs)	v	South Western Districts; 130 (20 overs)
Nathan Roux 68* (47); Jade Richter 3/24 (4 overs)		George Van Heerden 65* (48); Makhaya Ntini 4/16 (4 overs)

Border won by 25 runs
Buffalo Park, East London
Umpires: Jan Erasmus and Khawulani Ntuli

- South Western Districts won the toss and elected to field.

=== Final ===
23–24 November 2025
10:00
Scorecard

Knights; 155/7 (20 overs)	v	Border; 144/6 (20 overs)
Isaac Dikgale 57* (51); Kgaudisa Molefe 2/18 (4 overs)		Nathan Roux 43 (44); Jacques Snyman 3/31 (4 overs)

Knights won by 11 runs
Mangaung Oval, Bloemfontein
Umpires: Kerrin Klaaste and Mthokozisi Shezi

- Knights won the toss and elected to bat.
- The match was pushed to reserve day due to rain and wet outfield.

== See also ==
- 2025–26 CSA T20 Challenge
- 2025–26 CSA 4-Day Series
- 2025–26 CSA One-Day Cup
