= 2023–24 CSA T20 Knock-Out Competition =

Cricket tournament

2023–24 CSA Provincial T20 Cup
- Dates: 6 March – 7 April 2024
- Administrator: Cricket South Africa
- Cricket format: Twenty20
- Tournament format(s): Round-robin and knockout
- Host: South Africa
- Champions: Limpopo (1st title)
- Runners-up: Northern Cape
- Participants: 7
- Matches: 24
- Most runs: Ruan Haasbroek (289)
- Most wickets: Don Radebe (20)

The 2023–24 CSA T20 Knock-Out Competition also known as 2023–24 CSA Provincial T20 Cup) was a Twenty20 cricket tournament that took place in South Africa during March and April 2024. It was the fourth season of the CSA Provincial T20 Cup, organized by Cricket South Africa. The tournament ran from 6 March to 7 April 2024.

== Background ==
Cricket South Africa (CSA) announced the return of the CSA T20 competitions, promising an display of cricketing talent and excitement for fans across the nation.

The tournaments are set to kick off with Division 2 matches starting on Wednesday, 6 March 2024. This will be followed by Division 1 matches commencing on Friday, 8 March 2024, showcasing top-tier cricketing action that promises to keep spectators on the edge of their seats.

In Division 2, Eastern Cape Iinyathi, Six Gun Grill Garden Route Badgers, Northern Cape Heat, Mpumalanga Rhinos, ITEC Knights, Limpopo Impalas, and Eastern Storm will compete for supremacy, adding another layer of intensity and competition to the T20 format.

== Teams ==
Team	City	Captain	Coach
Eastern Cape Iinyathi		Jason Niemand	Tumelo Bodibe
Easterns Storm		Shane Dadswell	Geoffrey Toyana
ITEC Knights		Aubrey Swanepoel	JP Triegaardt
Limpopo Impalas		Ruan Haasbroek	Gordon Parsons
Mpumalanga Rhinos		Jurie Snyman	Gordon Matheson
Northern Cape Heat		Grant Thomson	Mark Charlton
Six Gun Grill Garden Route Badgers		Jean du Plessis	Gurshwin Rabie

== Squads ==
Border	Easterns	Knights	Limpopo	Mpumalanga	Northern Cape	South Western Districts
Jason Niemand(c), Eben Botha, Mncedisi Malika(w); Jerome Bossr; Jade de Klerk; Joshua Dodd; Phaphama Fojela; Thabile Hlatuka, Marco Marais; Dyllan Matthews; Jerry Nqolo, Nico van Zyl	Amaan Khan, Aron Visser, Dewan Marais, Mark Pearse, Shane Dadswell, Wesley Marshall, Divan Posthumus, Jason van Dyk, Juan Lubbe, Kabelo Sekhukhune, Kyle Landsberg, Mekyle Pillay, Shaylen Pillay, Danie Rossouw (wk) Andrew Rasemene Chad Classen Johannes van Dyk Thula Ngcobo: Tumelo Simelane	Seth Flerdermaus, Aubrey Swanepoel: Clayton Bosch; Dian Forrester; Jacques Snyman Jason Raubenheimer Patrick Botha Tiaan van Vuuren Garnett Tarr (wk) Gihahn Cloete (wk) Isaac Dikgale Nathan Roux (wk), Dane Piedt, Matthew Pollard, Mbongiseni Mhlanga, Monde Maqunqu, Nhlakanipho Mpungose, Orapeleng Motlhoaring, Sithembile Langa	Alex Pillay, Liam Peters, Louren Steenkamp, Ludwig Kaestner, Sello Seing, Maphekgola Pootona, Morne Venter, Wisani Mushwana, Ruan Haasbroek (wk), Sizwe Masondo (wk), Atwell Mokgoloboto, Daniel van der Merwe, Don Radebe, Eldred Hawken, Jesse Albanie, Kgaudisa Molefe, Maphekgola Patoona	Alexander Kok, Muhammed Mayet, Nhlanhla Dlamini, Yassar Cook, Zuan Swart, Akhulile Mkhatu, Gareth Dukes, Hermann Rolfes, Lindokuhle Pawuli, Benjamin van Niekerk (wk), Gregory Mahlokwana, Jon Hinrichsen, Jurie Snyman, Kieran Kenny, Ngazibini Sigwili, Tumi Koto	Jonathan Vandiar, Victor Mahlangu, Christopher Britz, Emmanuel Motswiri, Ernest Kemm, Grant Thomson, Romano Terblanche, Hanu Viljoen (wk), Jason Oakes (wk), Basheer Walters, Benjamin Van Rensburg, Jerome Xaba, Johannes van Dyk, Juan Landsberg, Tshepo Ntuli, Zakhele Qwabe	Enathi Khitshini; Jean du Plessis (c); Keenan Vieira, Kelly Smuts, Liyabona Malife, Matthew Christensen, Rhupino Plaatjies, Ruan Terblanche, Tyrese Karelse, Heath Richards, Khwezi Gumede, Nevada Jacobs, Thomas Kaber, Blayde Capell (wk), Hanno Kotze (wk), Jhedli Van Briesies (wk), Hershell America, Jarred Jardine, Marcello Piedt, Pheko Moletsane, Sintu Majeza

== Points table ==
Pos	Team	Pld	W	L	NR	Pts	NRR
1	Limpopo Impalas	6	5	0	1	23	0.920
2	ITEC Knights	6	4	1	1	20	1.475
3	Northern Cape Heat	6	3	2	1	15	0.253
4	Border Inyathi	6	3	3	0	12	−0.162
5	Easterns Storm	6	2	4	0	9	−0.229
6	Mpumalanga Rhinos	6	1	4	1	6	−1.620
7	South Western Badgers	6	1	5	0	4	−0.539

Source: ESPN Cricinfo

Advanced to Knockout stage

== Fixtures ==
On 20 August 2023, Cricket South Africa confirmed the full schedule for the tournament.

Match 1
6 March 2024
13:00
Scorecard

South Western Districts; 163/6 (20 Overs)	v	Northern Cape; 163/6 (19.5 Overs)

Northern Cape won by 4 wickets
Diamond Oval, Kimberley
Umpires: Jurie Sadler and Thomas Mokorosi

- Northern Cape won the toss and elected to field.
- Tyrese Karelse (South Western Districts) and Emmanuel Motswiri (Northern Cape) both made their T20 debuts.

Match 2
6 March 2024
13:00
Scorecard

Limpopo; 178/5 (20 overs)	v	Border; 171/8 (20 overs)

Limpopo won by 7 runs
Cricket Club Ground, Polokwane
Umpires: Andre Olivier and Lauren Agenbag

- Limpopo won the toss and elected to bat.
- Alex Pillay, Daniel van der Merwe, Wisani Mushwana (Limpopo) and Thabile Hlatuka (Border) all made their T20 debuts.

Match 3
6 March 2024
13:00
Scorecard

Mpumalanga; 202/5 (20 Overs)	v	Easterns; 180/7 (20 Overs)

Mpumalanga won by 22 runs
Uplands College, White River
Umpires: Jan Erasmus and Warren Wyngaard

- Easterns won the toss and elected to field.
- Hermann Rolfes, Junior Makua, Kieran Kenny (Mpumalanga) and Divan Posthumus (Easterns) all made their T20 debuts.

Match 4
9 March 2024
13:00
Scorecard

South Western Districts; 166/5 (20 Overs)	v	Knights; 167/6 (17.3 Overs)

Knights won by 4 wickets
Mangaung Oval, Bloemfontein
Umpires: Andre Olivierand and Mthokozisi Shezi

- Knights won the toss and elected to field.
- Dian Forrester, Garnett Tarr, Nhlakanipho Mpungose (Knights) all made their T20 debuts.

Match 5
9 March 2024
13:00
Scorecard

Easterns; 187/4 (20 Overs)	v	Border; 93/2 (9.1 Overs)

Border won by 16 runs (DLS method)
Willowmoore Park, Benoni
Umpires: Gladman Gaseba and Warren Wyngaard

- Border won the toss and elected to field first.

Match 6
10 March 2024
13:00
Scorecard

Limpopo; 158/8 (20 Overs)	v	Northern Cape; 145 (19.4 Overs)

Limpopo won by 13 runs
Cricket Club Ground, Polokwane
Umpires: Khawulani Ntuli and Bongani Ntshebe

- Limpopo won the toss and elected to bat.
- Christopher Britz (Northern Cape) made his T20 debut.

Match 7
12 March 2024
13:00
Scorecard

Easterns; 172/7 (20 overs)	v	South Western Districts; 163/9 (20 overs)

Easterns won by 9 runs
Recreation Ground, Oudtshoorn
Umpires: Kerrin Klaaste and Andre Olivier

- South Western Districts won the toss and elected to field.
- Liyabona Malife (South Western Districts) made his T20 debut.

Match 8
12 March 2024
13:00
Scorecard

Knights; 229/4 (20 overs)	v	Border; 198/5 (20 overs)

Knights won by 31 runs
Buffalo Park, East London
Umpires: Gladman Gaseba and Bongani Ntshebe

- Border won the toss and elected to field.
- Jacques van der Merwe and Nonelela Yikha (Border) both made their T20 debuts.

Match 9
14 March 2024
13:00
Scorecard

Limpopo; 92/4 (12 overs)	v	Mpumalanga

No result
Uplands College, White River
Umpires: Jan Erasmus and Jurie Sadler

- Mpumalanga won the toss and elected to field.
- No further play was possible due to rain.

Match 10
15 March 2024
13:00
Scorecard

Easterns; 174/7 (20 overs)	v	Northern Cape; 117 (20 overs)

Easterns won by 57 runs
Willowmoore Park, Benoni
Umpires: Lauren Agenbag and Warren Wyngaard

- Easterns won the toss and elected to bat.
- Kabelo Chibi (Northern Cape) made his T20 debut.

Match 11
16 March 2024
13:00
Scorecard

South Western Districts; 148/9 (20 overs)	v	Border; 149/8 (29.5 overs)

Border won by 2 wickets
Recreation Ground, Oudtshoorn
Umpires: Andre Olivier and Jurie Sadler

- South Western Districts won the toss and elected to bat.
- Olwakhe Goqoza (Border) made his T20 debut.

Match 12
17 March 2024
13:00
Scorecard

Limpopo; 176/3 (20 overs)	v	Knights; 156/8 (20 overs)

Limpopo won by 20 runs
Mangaung Oval, Bloemfontein
Umpires: Jan Erasmus and Thomas Mokorosi

- Limpopo won the toss and elected to bat.
- Jesse Albanie (Limpopo) made his T20 debut.

Match 13
18 March 2024
13:00
Scorecard

Northern Cape; 156/4 (20 overs)	v	Mpumalanga; 77 (15.4 overs)

Northern Cape won by 79 runs
De Beers Diamond Oval, Kimberley
Umpires: Jurie Sadler and Warren Wyngaard

- Northern Cape won the toss and elected to bat.

Match 14
20 March 2024
13:00
Scorecard

Easterns; 122 (19.1 overs)	v	Knights; 123/4 (15.3 overs)

Knights won by 6 wickets
Mangaung Oval, Bloemfontein
Umpires: Lauren Agenbag and Thomas Mokorosi

- Easterns won the toss and elected to bat.

Match 15
21 March 2024
13:00
Scorecard

Mpumalanga; 176/3 (20 overs)	v	South Western Districts; 177/3 (19 overs)

South Western Districts won by 7 wickets
Recreation Ground, Oudtshoorn
Umpires: Kerrin Klaaste and Mthokozisi Shezi

- South Western Districts won the toss and elected to field.

Match 16
24 March 2024
13:00
Scorecard

Northern Cape; 187/3 (20 overs)	v	Border; 175/9 (20 overs)

Northern Cape won by 12 runs
Buffalo Park, East London
Umpires: Jan Erasmus and Gladman Gaseba

- Northern Cape won the toss and elected to bat.

Match 17
24 March 2024
13:00
Scorecard

Limpopo; 140/6 (20 overs)	v	Easterns; 124 (19.3 overs)

Limpopo won by 16 runs
Willowmoore Park, Benoni
Umpires: Andre Olivier and Warren Wyngaard

- Limpopo won the toss and elected to bat.

Match 18
24 March 2024
13:00
Scorecard

Knights; 168/7 (20 overs)	v	Mpumalanga; 97 (16 overs)

Knights won by 71 runs
Uplands College, White River
Umpires: Roger Burne and Khawulani Ntuli

- Mpumalanga won the toss and elected to field

Match 19
27 March 2024
13:00
Scorecard

Mpumalanga; 109/6 (14 overs)	v	Border; 115/4 (13 overs)

Border won by 6 wickets
Buffalo Park, East London
Umpires: Gladman Gaseba and Mthokozisi Shezi

- Mpumalanga won the toss and elected to bat.
- The match was reduced to 14 overs per side due to rain.

Match 20
27 March 2024
13:00
Scorecard

Northern Cape	v	Knights

Match abandoned
De Beers Diamond Oval, Kimberley

- No toss.
- No play was possible due to rain.

Match 21
27 March 2024
13:00
Scorecard

Limpopo; 136/9 (20 overs)	v	South Western Districts; 100 (18.1 overs)

Limpopo won by 36 runs
Cricket Club Ground, Polokwane
Umpires: Khawulani Ntuli and Jurie Sadler

- Limpopo won the toss and elected to bat.
- Christopher King (Limpopo) made his T20 debut.

== Knockout stage ==
Semi-finals
1	Limpopo	159/8 (20 overs)
4	Border	142/6 (20 overs)
2	Knights	182/9 (20 overs)
3	Northern Cape	186/5 (20 overs)

Final
SFW1	Limpopo	136/4 (18.4 overs)
SFW2	Northern Cape	132/9 (20 overs)

=== Semi-finals ===
3 April 2023
13:00
Scorecard

Limpopo; 159/8 (20 overs)	v	Border; 142/6 (20 overs)

Limpopo won by 17 runs
Cricket Club Ground, Polokwane
Umpires: Jan Erasmus and Khawulani Ntuli

- Border won the toss and elected to field.

4 April 2024
13:00
Scorecard

Northern Cape; 186/5 (20 overs)	v	Knights; 182/9 (20 overs)

Northern Cpe won by 4 runs
Mangaung Oval, Bloemfontein
Umpires: Roger Burne and Jurie Sadler

- Northern Cape won the toss and elected to bat.
- Modiri Litheko (Northern Cape) and Ruan Cronje (Knights) both made their T20 debuts.

=== Final ===
7 April 2024
13:00
Scorecard

Northern Cape; 132/9 (20 overs)	v	Limpopo; 136/4 (18.4 overs)

Limpopo won by 6 wickets
Cricket Club Ground, Polokwane
Umpires: Andre Olivier and Warren Wyngaard

- Northern Cape won the toss and elected to bat.

== See also ==
- 2024 CSA T20 Challenge
- 2024 SA20

== Broadcasting ==
These matches will be streamed on the CSA YouTube Channel, allowing fans to catch all the action from wherever they are.
