= 2024–25 CSA T20 Knock-Out Competition =

Cricket tournament

2024–25 CSA Provincial T20 Cup
- Dates: 21 September – 20 October 2024
- Administrator: Cricket South Africa
- Cricket format: Twenty20
- Tournament format(s): Round-robin and knockout
- Host: South Africa
- Champions: ACDC Express Tuskers (1st title)
- Runners-up: Easterns Storm
- Participants: 7
- Matches: 24
- Most runs: Christopher Britz (495)
- Most wickets: Ziyaad Abrahams (15)

The 2024 CSA Provincial T20 Cup was a Twenty20 cricket tournament that took place in South Africa during September and October 2024. It was the 5th season of the CSA Provincial T20 Cup, organized by Cricket South Africa. The tournament ran from 21 September to 20 October 2024, the date of the final. Limpopo Impalas were the defending champion.

== Teams and squads ==
| Eastern Cape Iinyathi | Easterns Storm | ACDC Express Tuskers | Limpopo Impalas | Mpumalanga Rhinos | Northern Cape Heat | Six Gun Grill Garden Route Badgers |
Head Coaches
| Tumelo Bodibe | Geoffrey Toyana | Ahmed Amla | Gordon Parsons | Mbasa Gqadushe | Deon Carolus | Gurshwin Rabie |
Captains
| Jason Niemand | Grant Thomas | Louren Steenkamp | Michael Erlank | Muhammed Mayet | Ruan Haasbroek | Yaseen Valli |
Players
| Thobile Hlatuka; Jerome Bossr; Matthew Fourie; Nathan Roux; Sinovuyo Ntuntwana; Christopher Gleaves; Thozama Totana; Marco Marais; Russell Peterson; Mncedisi Malika; Jade de Klerk; Aphiwe Mnyanda; Jaques van der Merwe; Chad Classen; Ayabonga Tongo; Tladi Bokako; Olwakhe Goqoza | Kabelo Sekhukhune; Chris Britz; Danie Rossouw; Dewan Marais; Divan Posthumus; Andrew Rasemene; Shaylen Pillay; Tumelo Simelane; Martin Khumalo; Aaman Khan; Mark Pearse; Leander Lubbe; Aron Visser; Shaveer Khan; Kyle Landsberg; Nhlanhla Mashego; Mekyle Pillay | Kagiso Rapulana; Cameron Shekleton; Sean Whitehead; Sean Gilson; Chad Laycock; Ntando Zuma; James Ritchie; Thabiso Ndela; Ziyaad Abrahams; Mbulelelo Budaza; Mondli Khumalo; Daelen Fynn; Kyle Nipper | Liam Peters; Sizwe Masondo; Heinrigh Pieterse; Ludwig Kaestner; Morne Venter; Dilivio Ridgard; Daniel van der Merwe; Eldred Hawken; Don Radebe; Jesse-James Albanie; Kgaudise Molefe; Atwell Mokgoloboto; Johan Mahne | Jurie Snyman; Yassar Cook; Benjamin van Niekerk; Hermann Rolfes; Nonelela Yikha; Gareth Dukes; Jon Hinrichsen; Musa Twala; Karabo Mogotsi; Lindokuhle Pawuli; Shane Dadswell; Zakir Kathrada; Akhulile Mkatu; Themba Maupa | Ernest Kemm; Litheko Modiri; Ronan Herrman; Tian Koekemoer; Jonathan Vandiar; CP Klijnhans; Emanuel Motswiri; Romano Terblanche; Hardus Viljoen; Tshepo Ntuli; Basheer Walters; Benjamin Van Rensburg; Zakhele Qwabe; Gift Tshaka; Cole Abrahams | Kyle Jacobs; Tyrece Karelse; George van Heerden; Keenan Vieira; Kelly Smuts; Thomas Kaber; Liyabona Malife; Jarred Jardine; Heath Richards; Pheko Moletsane; Lifa Ntanzi; Hlompo Modimikoane |
Source:T20 knockout

== Points table ==
| Pos | Team | Pld | W | L | NR | Pts | NRR |
|---|---|---|---|---|---|---|---|
| 1 | Easterns Storm | 6 | 5 | 1 | 0 | 20 | — |
| 2 | ACDC Express Tuskers | 6 | 4 | 2 | 0 | 16 | — |
| 3 | South Western Badgers | 6 | 3 | 2 | 1 | 15 | — |
| 4 | Northern Cape Heat | 6 | 3 | 3 | 0 | 13 | — |
| 5 | Limpopo Impalas | 6 | 3 | 3 | 0 | 13 | — |
| 6 | Mpumalanga Rhinos | 6 | 2 | 3 | 1 | 10 | — |
| 7 | Border Inyathi | 6 | 0 | 6 | 0 | 0 | — |

Source: ESPN Cricinfo

Advanced to Knockout stage

== Fixtures ==
On 29 July 2024, Cricket South Africa confirmed the full schedule for the tournament.

Match 1
21 September 2024
Scorecard

| Easterns Storm; 171/6 (20 overs) | v | Northern Cape Heat; 170/6 (20 overs) |

Easterns Storm won by 1 run
De Beers Diamond Oval, Kimberley
Umpires: Roger Burne and Jurie Sadler

- Northern Cape won the toss and elected to field.
- Shaveer Khan (Easterns) made his T20 debut.

Match 2
21 September 2024
Scorecard

| ACDC Express Tuskers; 162/4 (20 overs) | v | Limpopo Impalas; 89 (16.5 overs) |

Tuskers won by 73 runs
Cricket Club Ground, Polokwane
Umpires: Siphelele Gasa and Gladman Gaseba

- Limpopo won the toss and elected to field.
- Sean Gilson, James Ritchie, Thabiso Ndlela and Chad Laycock (KwaZulu-Natal Inland) all made their T20 debuts.

Match 3
21 September 2024
Scorecard

| Mpumalanga Rhinos | v | South Western Badgers |

Match abandoned
Uplands College, White River
Umpires: Bongani Jele and Stacy Lackay

- No toss.
- No play was possible due to rain.

Match 4
24 September 2024
Scorecard

| Limpopo Impalas; 188/2 (20 overs) | v | Border Inyathi; 166/6 (20 overs) |

Limpopo Impalas won by 22 runs
Buffalo Park, East London
Umpires: Bongani Ntshebe and Dan van der Merwe

- Limpopo won the toss and elected to bat.
- Christopher Gleaves (Border) made his T20 debut.

Match 5
24 September 2024
Scorecard

| South Western Badgers; 165/4 (20 overs) | v | Easterns Storm; 167/7 (18.3 overs) |

Easterns Storm won by 3 wickets
Willowmoore Park, Benoni
Umpires: Muhammad Jooma and Khawulani Ntuli

- Easterns won the toss and elected to field.
- Keenan Vieira (South Western Districts) made his T20 debut.

Match 6
24 September 2024
Scorecard

| Northern Cape Heat; 202/4 (20 overs) | v | Mpumalanga Rhinos; 184/7 (20 overs) |

Northern Cape Heat won by 18 runs
Uplands College, White River
Umpires: Bongani Jele and Waldo Lategan

- Northern Cape won the toss and elected to bat.

Match 7
28 September 2024
Scorecard

| South Western Badgers; 146/8 (20 overs) | v | Limpopo Impalas; 150/4 (15.5 overs) |

Limpopo Impalas won by 6 wickets
Recreation Ground, Oudtshoorn
Umpires: Kerrin Klaaste and Warren Wyngaard

- South Western Districts won the toss and elected to bat.

Match 8
28 September 2024
Scorecard

| ACDC Express Tuskers; 132/6 (20 overs) | v | Border Inyathi; 123/9 (20 overs) |

Tuskers won by 9 runs
City Oval, Pietermaritzburg
Umpires: Jan Erasmus and Muhammad Jooma

- KwaZulu-Natal Inland won the toss and elected to bat.

Match 9
29 September 2024
Scorecard

| Easterns Storm; 171/8 (20 overs) | v | Mpumalanga Rhinos; 148/8 (20 overs) |

Easterns Storm won by 23 runs
Willowmoore Park, Benoni
Umpires: Gladman Gaseba and Jurie Sadler

- Mpumalanga won the toss and elected to field.

Match 10
2 October 2024
Scorecard

| ACDC Express Tuskers; 153/8 (20 overs) | v | South Western Badgers; 156/4 (19.1 overs) |

South Western Badgers won by 6 wickets
Recreation Ground, Oudtshoorn
Umpires: Willhelm Nell and Andre Olivier

- South Western Districts won the toss and elected to field.

Match 11
2 October 2024
Scorecard

| Northern Cape Heat; 158/8 (20 overs) | v | Border Inyathi; 141/8 (20 overs) |

Northern Cape Heat won by 17 runs
De Beers Diamond Oval, Kimberley
Umpires: Waldo Lategan and Thomas Mokorosi

- Northern Cape won the toss and elected to bat.
- Cole Abrahams (Northern Cape) made his T20 debut.

Match 12
2 October 2024
Scorecard

| Easterns Storm; 201/4 (20 overs) | v | Limpopo Impalas; 189/6 (20 overs) |

Easterns Storm won by 12 runs
Cricket Club Ground, Polokwane
Umpires: Khawulani Ntuli and Mthokozisi Shezi

- Easterns won the toss and elected to bat.

Match 13
5 October 2024
Scorecard

| Border Inyathi; 114/9 (20 overs) | v | South Western Badgers; 115/2 (15.5 overs) |

South Western Badgers won by 8 wickets
Buffalo Park, East London
Umpires: Jan Erasmus and Bongani Ntshebe

- South Western Districts won the toss and elected to field.
- Ayabonga Tongo (Border) made his T20 debut.

Match 14
5 October 2024
Scorecard

| ACDC Express Tuskers; 170/3 (20 overs) | v | Northern Cape Heat; 144/9 (20 overs) |

Tuskers won by 26 runs
City Oval, Pietermaritzburg
Umpires: Mthokozisi Shezi and Dennis Smith

- KwaZulu-Natal Inland won the toss and elected to bat.

Match 15
6 October 2024
Scorecard

| Limpopo Impalas; 141/6 (20 overs) | v | Mpumalanga Rhinos; 122 (19.5 overs) |

Limpopo Impalas won by 19 runs
Cricket Club Ground, Polokwane
Umpires: Roger Burne and Kerrin Klaaste

- Limpopo won the toss and elected to bat.

Match 16
9 October 2024
Scorecard

| South Western Badgers; 141/6 (20 overs) | v | Northern Cape Heat; 132 (20 overs) |

South Western Badgers won by 9 runs
Recreation Ground, Oudtshoorn
Umpires: Stacy Lackay and Andre Olivier

- South Western Districts won the toss and elected to bat.
- Luke Beaufort (South Western Districts) made his T20 debut.

Match 17
9 October 2024
Scorecard

| Border Inyathi; 163/3 (20 overs) | v | Easterns Storm; 165/3 (17.3 overs) |

Easterns Storm won by 7 wickets
Buffalo Park, East London
Umpires: Khawulani Ntuli and Francois van der Merwe

- Border won the toss and elected to bat.

Match 18
9 October 2024
Scorecard

| Mpumalanga Rhinos; 172/5 (20 overs) | v | ACDC Express Tuskers; 172/5 (20 overs) |

Match tied
(Mpumalanga Rhinos won the Super Over)
City Oval, Pietermaritzburg
Umpires: Muhammad Jooma and Jurie Sadler

- KwaZulu-Natal Inland won the toss and elected to field.

Match 19
12 October 2024
Scorecard

| Northern Cape Heat; 196/4 (20 overs) | v | Limpopo Impalas; 116 (18 overs) |

Northern Cape Heat won by 80 runs
De Beers Diamond Oval, Kimberley
Umpires: Roger Burne and Bongani Ntshebe

- Limpopo won the toss and elected to field.
- Gerald Pike (Northern Cape) made his T20 debut.

Match 20
12 October 2024
Scorecard

| ACDC Express Tuskers; 144 (19.5 overs) | v | Easterns Storm; 143/8 (20 overs) |

Tuskers won by 1 run
Willowmoore Park, Benoni
Umpires: Jan Erasmus and Willhelm Nell

- Easterns won the toss and elected to field.
- Daelen Fynn (KwaZulu-Natal Inland) made his T20 debut.

Match 21
12 October 2024
Scorecard

| Border Inyathi; 162/4 (20 overs) | v | Mpumalanga Rhinos; 165/4 (18.4 overs) |

Mpumalanga Rhinos won by 6 wickets
Uplands College, White River
Umpires: Gladman Gaseba and Stacy Lackay

- Border won the toss and elected to bat.
- Mathew Fourie (Border) made his T20 debut.

== Knockout stage ==
Semi-finals
1 | Easterns Storm | 222/2 (20)
4 | Northern Cape Heat | 145 (19.5)
2 | ACDC Express Tuskers | 115/2 (15)
3 | South Western Badgers | 120/8 (20)

Final
SFW1 | Easterns Storm | 129/9 (20)
SFW2 | ACDC Express Tuskers | 130/3 (18.2)

=== Semi-finals ===
16 October 2024
13:00
Scorecard

| Easterns Storm; 222/2 (20 overs) | v | Northern Cape Heat; 145 (19.5 overs) |

Easterns Storm won by 77 runs
Willowmoore Park, Benoni
Umpires: Jurie Sadler and Kerrin Klaaste

- Northern Cape won the toss and elected to field first

17 October 2024
13:00
Scorecard

| South Western Badgers; 120/8 (20 overs) | v | ACDC Express Tuskers; 115/2 (15 overs) |

Tuskers won by 31 runs (DLS method)
City Oval, Pietermaritzburg
Umpires: Jan Erasmus and Mthokozisi Shezi

- South Western Badgers won the toss and elected to bat first

=== Final ===
20–21 October 2024
13:00
Scorecard

| Easterns Storm; 129/9 (20) | v | ACDC Express Tuskers; 130/3 (18.2 Overs) |

KZN-Inland won by 7 wickets
Willowmoore Park, Benoni
Umpires: Jurie Sadler and Kerrin Klaaste
Player of the match: Cameron Shekleton (KwaZulu-Natal Inland)

- Easterns won the toss and elected to bat first
- Reserve day used.
