= 2025–26 CSA One-Day Cup =

Cricket tournament

- Dates: 21 February – 29 March 2026
- Administrator: Cricket South Africa
- Cricket format: List A
- Tournament format(s): Round-robin and knockout
- Champions: Titans (Division 1) (6th title)
- Participants: 16
- Matches: 60
- Most runs: Zubayr Hamza (419)
- Most wickets: Gideon Peters (16); Duan Jansen (16)

The 2025–26 CSA One-Day Cup was the 46th season of CSA One-Day Cup, the List A cricket tournament organised by Cricket South Africa in South Africa. The tournament took place from 21 February to 29 March 2026. Dolphins (Division 1) were the defending champions.

== Teams ==
The teams were placed into the following divisions:

- Division 1:

Warriors, Western Province, Titans, Lions, KwaZulu-Natal (Inland), Boland, North West, Dolphins

- Division 2:

South Western Districts, Knights, Border, Easterns, Northern Cape, Limpopo, Mpumalanga, South Africa Emerging Players

== Standings ==
=== Division 1 ===
Pos	Team	Pld	W	L	NR	BP	Ded	Pts	NRR	Qualification
1	Lions	7	5	0	2	3	0	27	1.482	Advanced to the Final
2	Warriors	7	5	0	2	2	0	26	0.890	Advanced to the Qualifier
3	Titans	7	4	2	1	1	0	19	−0.251	Advanced to the Qualifier
4	North West	7	2	3	2	2	0	14	0.734	
5	Boland	7	3	4	0	1	0	13	0.072	
6	Dolphins	7	2	4	1	0	0	10	−1.274	
7	Western Province	7	1	5	1	0	0	6	−0.102	
8	KwaZulu-Natal Inland	7	1	5	1	0	0	6	−1.013	

Source: ESPNcricinfo

=== Division 2 ===
Pos	Team	Pld	W	L	NR	Pts	NRR	Qualification
1	Knights	7	5	2	0	24	0.601	Advanced to the Final
2	Border	7	5	2	0	22	0.477	Advanced to the Qualifier
3	Mpumalanga	7	4	2	1	22	1.243	Advanced to the Qualifier
4	South Western Districts	7	4	3	0	18	0.660	
5	Easterns	7	3	2	2	18	−0.269	
6	Limpopo	7	3	3	1	14	−0.509	
7	South Africa Emerging Players	7	1	5	1	7	−1.233	
8	Northern Cape	7	0	6	1	2	−1.134	

Source: ESPNcricinfo

== Division 1 fixtures ==
27 February 2026
13:00 (D/N)
Scorecard

Dolphins; 279/7 (50 overs)	v	Warriors; 283/4 (47.2 overs)
Hanu Viljoen 74 (73); Kerwin Mungroo 2/42 (10 overs)		Matthew Breetzke 121 (106); JJ Smuts 2/31 (10 overs)

Warriors won by 6 wickets
St George's Park, Gqeberha
Umpires: Arno Jacobs and Thomas Mokorosi

- Dolphins won the toss and elected to bat.
- Points: Warriors 4, Dolphins 0

28 February 2026
13:00 (D/N)
Scorecard

Western Province; 259/7 (42 overs)	v	Lions; 245/4 (36 overs)
David Bedingham 103 (93); Codi Yusuf 2/43 (7 overs)		Mitchell Van Buuren 88* (76); Josh Breed 1/39 (5 overs)

Lions won by 15 runs (DLS method)
Wanderers Stadium, Johannesburg
Umpires: Lubabalo Gcuma and Stephen Harris

- Western Province won the toss and elected to bat.
- The match was reduced to 42 overs per side due to rain.
- Rain prevented any further play.
- Lions were 15 runs ahead of the DLS par score when rain interrupted the match.
- Points: Lions 4, Western Province 0

1 March 2026
10:00
Scorecard

North West; 291/7 (50 overs)	v	KwaZulu-Natal Inland; 219 (46.2 overs)
Dian Forrester 68 (67); Daryn Dupavillon 3/52 (9 overs)		Malcolm Nofal 66 (86); Onke Nyaku 6/41 (7.2 overs)

North West won by 72 runs
City Oval, Pietermaritzburg
Umpires: Siphelele Gasa and Ryan Hendricks

- KwaZulu-Natal Inland won the toss and elected to field.
- Onke Nyaku (North West) took his maiden five-wicket haul in List A cricket.
- Points: North West 5, KwaZulu-Natal Inland 0

1 March 2026
10:00
Scorecard

Titans; 235/5 (28 overs)	v	Boland; 213/9 (22 overs)
Lhuan-dre Pretorius 101 (74); Akhona Mnyaka 2/41 (4 overs)		Grant Roelofsen 62 (38); Duan Jansen 2/19 (3 overs)

Titans won by 13 runs (DLS method)
Centurion Park, Centurion
Umpires: Andre Olivier and Dennis Smith

- Boland won the toss and elected to field.
- The match was reduced to 28 overs per side due to rain.
- Keagan Lion-Cachet (Titans) made his List A debut.
- Boland were set a revised target of 227 runs form 22 overs due to rain.
- Points: Titans 4, Boland 0

3 March 2026
10:00
Scorecard

Western Province; 244/7 (50 overs)	v	Warriors; 245/5 (47.3 overs)
Kyle Verreynne 72 (111); Thomas Kaber 2/42 (10 overs)		Senuran Muthusamy 61 (54); Kyle Simmonds 3/32 (10 overs)

Warriors won by 5 wickets
Newlands Cricket Ground, Cape Town
Umpires: Brad White and Warren Wyngaard

- Warriors won the toss and elected to field.
- Points: Warriors 4, Western Province 0

4 March 2026
13:00 (D/N)
Scorecard

Boland; 224/9 (50 overs)	v	KwaZulu-Natal Inland; 181 (44.2 overs)
Ferisco Adams 76 (73); Wayne Parnell 2/10 (4 overs)		Michael Erlank 34 (53); Glenton Stuurman 4/31 (6.2 overs)

Boland won by 43 runs
Boland Park, Paarl
Umpires: Marais Erasmus and Abongile Sodumo

- Boland won the toss and elected to bat.
- Points: Boland 4, KwaZulu-Natal Inland 0

4 March 2026
13:00 (D/N)
Scorecard

Lions; 229/3 (42 overs)	v	North West
Zubayr Hamza 115* (121); Dian Forrester 1/34 (5 overs)

No result
JB Marks Oval, Potchefstroom
Umpires: Lauren Agenbag and Bongani Jele

- North west won the toss and elected to field.
- Rain prevented any further play.
- Points: Lions 2, North West 2

5 March 2026
13:00 (D/N)
Scorecard

Dolphins; 281/9 (50 overs)	v	Titans; 152/9 (20 overs)
Marques Ackerman 92 (74); Duan Jansen 3/54 (9 overs)		Andile Phehlukwayo 26 (17); Andile Simelane 4/29 (4 overs)

Dolphins won by 12 runs (DLS method)
Kingsmead Cricket Ground, Durban
Umpires: Mazizi Gampu and Thomas Mokorosi

- Titans won the toss and elected to field.
- Gomolemo Phiri (Dolphins) made his List A debut.
- Titans were set a revised target of 165 runs from 20 overs due to rain.
- Points: Dolphins 4, Titans 0

6 March 2026
13:00 (D/N)
Scorecard

Lions	v	Warriors

Match abandoned
Wanderers Stadium, Johannesburg

- No toss.
- No play was possible due to rain.
- Points: Lions 2, Warriors 2

7 March 2026
13:00 (D/N)
Scorecard

North West; 121 (23.2 overs)	v	Boland; 115 (24.1 overs)
Grant Roelofsen 39 (37); Caleb Seleka 4/15 (5.2 overs)		Lesiba Ngoepe 30 (46); Ferisco Adams 3/15 (5 overs)

Boland won by 6 runs
JB Marks Oval, Potchefstroom
Umpires: Arno Jacobs and Brad White

- North West won the toss and elected field.
- The match was reduced to 27 overs per side due to rain.
- Points: Boland 4, North West 0

8 March 2026
10:00
Scorecard

KwaZulu-Natal Inland; 211/9 (41 overs)	v	Dolphins; 66/2 (15 overs)
Malcolm Nofal 49 (67); Imran Tahir 3/41 (9 overs)		Tshepang Dithole 33 (48); Wayne Parnell 1/13 (3 overs)

No result
City Oval, Pietermaritzburg
Umpires: Lubabalo Gcuma and Abdoellah Steenkamp

- KwaZulu-Natal Inland won the toss and elected bat.
- The match was reduced 41 overs per side due to rain.
- Matthew Urquhart (KwaZulu-Natal Inland) and Zedan Mahomed (Dolphins) both made their List A debuts.
- Dolphins were set a revised target of 209 runs from 36 overs due to rain.
- Points: KwaZulu-Natal Inland 2, Dolphins 2

8 March 2026
10:00
Scorecard

Western Province; 220 (44.3 overs)	v	Titans; 222/8 (48 overs)
Oliver Whitehead 55 (67); Duan Jansen 3/45 (8.3 overs)		Keegan Petersen 71 (101); Kyle Simmonds 4/34 (10 overs)

Titans won by 2 wickets
Centurion Park, Centurion
Umpires: Andre Olivier and Abongile Sodumo

- Titans won the toss and elected field.

10 March 2026
13:00 (D/N)
Scorecard

Warriors; 262/8 (50 overs)	v	North West; 251 (49 overs)
Matthew de Villiers 113 (101); Alfred Mothoa 4/44 (10 overs)		Wihan Lubbe 80 (113); Gideon Peters 5/48 (10 overs)

Warriors won by 11 runs
St George's Park, Gqeberha

- Matthew de Villiers (Warrior) scored his maiden century in List A cricket.
- Gideon Peters (Warrior) took his maiden five-wicket haul in List A cricket.

11 March 2026
13:00 (D/N)
Scorecard

Boland; 185 (47.1 overs)	v	Western Province; 187/7 (44.5 overs)
Jhedli van Briesies 59 (86); Nandre Burger 4/30 (10 overs)		Jiveshan Pillay 54 (74); Ethan-John Cunningham 3/21 (6.5 overs)

Western Province won by 3 wickets
Newlands Cricket Ground, Cape Town
Umpires: Dennis Smith and Warren Wyngaard

- Boland won the toss and elected to bat.
- Points: Western Province 4, Boland 0

11 March 2026
13:00 (D/N)
Scorecard

Dolphins; 239/9 (50 overs)	v	Lions; 242/3 (39.1 overs)
Romashan Pillay 58 (70); Nqabayomzi Peter 5/38 (10 overs)		Zubayr Hamza 119* (127); Imran Tahir 2/50 (10 overs)

Lions won by 7 wicket
Wanderers Stadium, Johannesburg
Umpires: Bongani Jele and Lubabalo Gcuma

- Lions won the toss and elected to field.
- Nqabayomzi Peter (Lions) took his maiden five-wicket haul in List A cricket.
- Points: Lions 5, Dolphins 0

12 March 2026
13:00 (D/N)
Scorecard

KwaZulu-Natal Inland; 180/7 (20 overs)	v	Titans; 181/4 (19 overs)
Andile Mokgakane 43 (33); Junior Dala 3/27 (4 overs)		Neil Brand 58* (30); Sean Gilson 2/35 (4 overs)

Titans won by 6 wickets
Centurion Park, Centurion
Umpires: Mazizi Gampu and Abdoellah Steenkamp

- Titans won the toss and elected to field.
- The match was reduced to 20 overs per side due to rain.
- Points: Titans 4, KwaZulu-Natal Inland 0

14 March 2026
13:00 (D/N)
Scorecard

Warriors; 400/5 (50 overs)	v	Boland; 313 (44.5 overs)
Matthew de Villiers 133 (77); Keith Dudgeon		Blayde Capell 94 (89); Kerwin Mungroo 3/58 (9 overs)

Warriors won by 87 runs
Boland Park, Paarl
Umpires: Andre Olivier and Warren Wyngaard

- Warriors won the toss and elected to bat.
- Jean Upman (Warriors) made his List A debut.
- Points: Warriors 5, Boland 0

14 March 2026
13:00 (D/N)
Scorecard

North West; 272/8 (50 overs)	v	Dolphins; 138 (37.1 overs)
Lesiba Ngoepe 88 (68); Bayanda Majola 3/61 (10 overs)		Romashan Pillay 34 (51); Caleb Seleka 4/23 (8 overs)

North West won by 134 runs
Kingsmead Cricket Ground, Durban
Umpires: Stephen Harris and Waldo Lategan

- North West won the toss and elected to bat.
- Points: North West 5, Dolphins 0

15 March 2026
10:00
Scorecard

Western Province; 269 (47.1 overs)	v	KwaZulu-Natal Inland; 274/8 (50 overs)
Jiveshan Pillay 114 (132); Bamanye Xenxe 3/56 (9 overs)		Wayne Parnell 89* (78); Dane Paterson 5/34 (10 overs)

KwaZulu-Natal Inland won by 2 wickets
Newlands Cricket Ground, Cape Town
Umpires: Abongile Sodumo and Abdoellah Steenkamp

- KwaZulu-Natal Inland won the toss and elected to field.
- Points: KwaZulu-Natal Inland 4, Western Province 0

15 March 2026
10:00
Scorecard

Lions; 165/2 (32.3 overs)	v	Titans; 114 (21 overs)
Reeza Hendricks 82* (106); Dayyaan Galiem 1/29 (6.3 overs)		Andile Phehlukwayo 31 (20); Reeza Hendricks 3/11 (2 overs)

Lions won by 120 runs (DLS method)
Wanderers Stadium, Johannesburg
Umpires: Mazizi Gampu and Brad White

- Titans won the toss and elected to field.
- Play was stopped during 32.3 overs in the Lions innings.
- Titans were set a revised target of 235 runs from 32 overs due to rain.
- Points: Lions 5, Titans 0

17 March 2026
13:00 (D/N)
Scorecard

Dolphins; 109 (30.4 overs)	v	Boland; 113/1 (24.2 overs)
Marques Ackerman 40 (52); Jevano Baron 4/24 (10 overs)		Blayde Capell 60* (86); Imran Tahir 1/31 (7 overs)

Boland won by 9 wickets
Kingsmead Cricket Ground, Durban
Umpires: Lubabalo Gcuma and Warren Wyngaard

- Dolphins won the toss and elected to bat.
- Aryan Gopalan (Dolphins) and Jevano Baron (Boland) both made their List A debuts.
- Points: Boland 5, Dolphins 0

18 March 2026
13:00 (D/N)
Scorecard

Titans; 109/8 (34 overs)	v	Warriors
Neil Brand 21 (33); Thomas Kaber 3/15 (7 overs)

No result
St George's Park, Gqeberha
Umpires: Stephen Harris and Brad White

- Titans won the toss and elected to bat.
- No further play was possible due to rain.
- Points: Titans 2, Warriors 2

18 March 2026
10:00
Scorecard

Lions; 265/5 (50 overs)	v	KwaZulu-Natal Inland; 94/4 (24.1 overs)
Zubayr Hamza 75 (97); Malcolm Nofal 2/31 (7 overs)		Malcolm Nofal 34 (61); Delano Potgieter 2/11 (4.1 overs)

Lions won by 47 runs (DLS method)
City Oval, Pietermaritzburg
Umpires: Bongani Jele and Dennis Smith

- Lions won the toss and elected to bat.
- Rain prevented any further play.
- KwaZulu-Natal Inland were 47 runs behind of the DLS par score when rain interrupted the match.
- Ponts: Lions 5, KwaZulu-Natal Inland 0

19 March 2026
13:00 (D/N)
Scorecard

North West; 270/6 (50 overs)	v	Western Province; 29/1 (4.4 overs)
Wihan Lubbe 105 (119); Dane Paterson 2/43 (9 overs)		Jiveshan Pillay 16* (21); Onke Nyaku 1/8 (2.4 overs)

No result
JB Marks Oval, Potchefstroom
Umpires: Siphelele Gasa and Abongile Sodumo

- Western Province won the toss and elected to field.
- Rain prevented any further play.
- Carl Fryer (North West) and Mbulelo Dube (Western Province) both made their List A debuts.
- Points: North West 2, Western Province 2

21 March 2026
13:00 (D/N)
Scorecard

Lions; 243/7 (50 overs)	v	Boland; 208 (48.4 overs)
Delano Potgieter 91 (78); Yves Kamanzi 4/38 (10 overs)		Gavin Kaplan 72 (100); Reeza Hendricks 3/33 (5 overs)

Lions won by 34 runs
Boland Park, Paarl
Umpires: Marais Erasmus and Brad White

- Lions won the toss and elected to bat.
- Points: Lions 4, Boland 0

21 March 2026
10:00
Scorecard

KwaZulu-Natal Inland; 197 (46.5 overs)	v	Warriors; 200/5 (35.5 overs)
Malcolm Nofal 57 (100); Gideon Peters 4/32 (9 overs)		Sinethemba Qeshile 55 (66); Bamanye Xenxe 3/47 (10 overs)

Warriors won by 5 wickets
St George's Park, Gqeberha
Umpires: Andre Olivier and Warren Wyngaard

- KwaZulu-Natal Inland won the toss and elected to bat.
- Points: Warriors 5, KwaZulu-Natal Inland 0

22 March 2026
10:00
Scorecard

Western Province; 235 (48.4 overs)	v	Dolphins; 239/9 (48.5 overs)
Kyle Verreynne 104 (119); Bayanda Majola 4/47 (9.4 overs)		Bryce Parsons 105 (121); Josh Breed 3/33 (6.5 overs)

Dolphins won by 1 wicket
Kingsmead Cricket Ground, Durban
Umpires: Mazizi Gampu and Thomas Mokorosi

- Dolphins won the toss and elected to field.
- Semal Pillay (Dolphins) made his List A debut.
- Bryce Parsons (Dolphins) scored his maiden century in List A cricket.

22 March 2026
10:00
Scorecard

North West; 167/8 (42 overs)	v	Titans; 145/2 (21 overs)
Wihan Lubbe 67 (65); Duan Jansen 3/32 (6 overs)		Rivaldo Moonsamy 60* (56); Onke Nyaku 1/33 (4 overs)

Titans won by 8 wickets (DLS method)
Centurion Park, Centurion
Umpires: Siphelele Gasa and Stephen Harris

- Titans won the toss and elected to field.
- The match was reduced to 42 overs per side due to rain.
- Titans were set a revised target of 144 runs from 29 overs due to rain.
- Points: Titans 5, North West 0

== Division 2 fixtures ==
21 February 2026
10:00
Scorecard

Northern Cape; 270/7 (50 overs)	v	South Western Districts; 275/3 (47.3 overs)
Ronan Hermann 128 (115); Zack Momberg 3/56 (9 overs)		Ruan Terblanche 133* (134); Liam Doherty 1/17 (2 overs)

South Western Districts won by 7 wickets
Recreation Ground, Oudtshoorn
Umpires: Willhelm Nell and Keagan Williams

- Northern Cape won the toss and elected to bat.
- Banele Cele (South Western Districts), David Christie, Liam Doherty and Charl Prinsloo (Northern Cape) all made their List A debuts.
- Ruan Terblanche (South Western Districts) scored his maiden century in List A cricket.
- Points: South Western Districts 4, Northern Cape 0

21 February 2026
10:00
Scorecard

Mpumalanga; 286/7 (50 overs)	v	Easterns; 16/0 (4.2 overs)
Yassar Cook 85 (114); Jesse Albanie 3/55 (9 overs)		Jurie Snyman 9* (13)

No result
Willowmoore Park, Benoni
Umpires: Muhammed Jooma and Mthokozisi Shezi

- Easterns won the toss and elected to field.
- Rain prevented any further play.
- Brayden Hicks (Easterns) and Tetelo Maphaka (Mpumalanga) both made their List A debuts.
- Points: Easterns 2, Mpumalanga 2

22 February 2026
10:00
Scorecard

South Africa Emerging Players; 270/7 (50 overs)	v	Border; 187 (46 overs)
Jorich Van Schalkwyk 142 (153); Chad Classen 2/46 (10 overs)		Thando Ntini 49 (53); Bandile Mbatha 4/30 (90 overs)

South Africa Emerging Players won by 83 runs
Buffalo Park, East London
Umpires: Gladman Gaseba and Evan van der Merwe

- Border won the toss and elected to field.
- Christiaan du Toit, Wian Ruthven (Border), JJ Basson, Corne Botha, Ryall Julies and Sipho Potsane (South Africa Emerging Players) all made their List A debuts.
- Jorich Van Schalkwyk (South Africa Emerging Players) scored his maiden century in List A cricket.
- Points: South Africa Emerging Players 5, Border 0

22 February 2026
10:00
Scorecard

Knights; 328/4 (50 overs)	v	Limpopo; 246/9 (50 overs)
Cole Abrahams 82 (83); Emmanuel Motswiri 2/35 (8 overs)		Tiaan Brits 56 (61); Dane Piedt 3/28 (10 overs)

Knights won by 82 runs
Cricket Club Ground, Polokwane
Umpires: Waldo Lategan and Khawulani Ntuli

- Knights won the toss and elected to bat.
- Tiaan Brits, Kyle Glennistor, Declan Osborn, Tylor Trenoweth (Limpopo) and Richard Maree (Knights) all made their List A debuts.
- Points: Knights 5, Limpopo 0

25 February 2026
10:00
Scorecard

Northern Cape; 114 (33.3 overs)	v	Easterns; 115/4 (30.5 overs)
Romano Terblanche 61* (76); Andrew Rasemene 3/26 (8 overs)		Jurie Snyman 38 (66); Odirile Modimokoane 1/9 (2 overs)

Easterns won by 6 wickets
De Beers Diamond Oval, Kimberley
Umpires: Roger Burne and Jurie Sadler

- Easterns won the toss and elected to field.
- Joseph van Rensburg (Northern Cape) made his List A debut.
- Points: Easterns 5, Northern Cape 0

25 February 2026
09:30
Scorecard

South Western Districts; 214 (45.3 overs)	v	Mpumalanga; 215/5 (37.4 overs)
Heath Richards 54 (53); Gareth Dukes 3/35 (10 overs)		Hermann Rolfes 50* (70); Liam Alder 2/40 (10 overs)

Mpumalanga won by 5 wickets
Uplands College, White River
Umpires: Jan Erasmus and Muhammed Jooma

- South Western Districts won the toss and elected to bat.
- B Brokensha (Mpumalanga) made his List A debut.
- Points: Mpumalanga 5, South Western Districts 0

26 February 2026
10:00
Scorecard

Knights; 229/8 (50 overs)	v	Border; 182 (45.2 overs)
Gihahn Cloete 79 (94); Michael Copeland 3/46 (10 overs)		Nathan Roux 54 (62); Jacques Snyman 2/13 (2.2 overs)

Knights won by 47 runs
Mangaung Oval, Bloemfontein
Umpires: Siphelele Gasa and Heinrich Killian

- Border won the toss and elected to field.
- Points: Knights 5, Border 0

26 February 2026
10:00
Scorecard

South Africa Emerging Players; 273/8 (50 overs)	v	Limpopo; 276/3 (49.4 overs)
Adnaan Lagadien 123 (122); Don Radebe 5/52 (10 overs)		Ludwig Kaestner 142 (135); Bandile Mbatha 1/33 (8 overs)

Limpopo won by 7 wickets
Tuks Cricket Oval, Pretoria
Umpires: Waldo Lategan and Evan van der Merwe

- Limpopo won the toss and elected to field.
- Dayalan Boyce and Divan de Villiers (South Africa Emerging Players) both made their List A debuts.
- Adnaan Lagadien (South Africa Emerging Players) and Ludwig Kaestner (Limpopo) both scored their maiden centuries in List A cricket.
- Points: South Africa Emerging Players 4, Limpopo 0

28 February 2026
10:00
Scorecard

Easterns; 298/7 (50 overs)	v	South Western Districts; 154/3 (29.4 overs)
Christopher Britz 72 (42); Banele Cele 2/54 (10 overs)		Kyle Jacobs 72* (80); Andrew Rasemene 2/31 (5 overs)

Easterns won by 4 runs (DLS method)
Willowmoore Park, Benoni
Umpires: Jan Erasmus and Godwin Von Willingh

- South Western Districts won the toss and elected to field.
- Rain prevented any further play.
- Points: Easterns 4, South Western Districts 0

1 March 2026
10:00
Scorecard

South Africa Emerging Players; 148 (32.5 overs)	v	Knights; 152/9 (38 overs)
Steve Stolk 36 (24); Tiaan van Vuuren 3/19 (5.3 overs)		Gihahn Cloete 43 (37); Muhammad Manack 2/30 (10 overs)

Knights won by 1 wicket
Mangaung Oval, Bloemfontein
Umpires: Roger Burne and Willhelm Nell

- Knights won the toss and elected to field.
- Paul Matlala (South Africa Emerging Players) made his List A debut.
- Points: Knights 5, South Africa Emerging Players 0

1 March 2026
10:00
Scorecard

Limpopo; 303/7 (50 overs)	v	Northern Cape; 290/9 (50 overs)
Ludwig Kaestner 165* (148); Morne Venter 2/48 (9 overs)		Romano Terblanche 70 (50); Emmanuel Motswiri 5/34 (8 overs)

Limpopo won by 13 runs
De Beers Diamond Oval, Kimberley
Umpires: Heinrich Killian and Keagan Williams

- Limpopo won the toss and elected to bat.
- Emmanuel Motswiri (Limpopo) took his maiden five-wicket haul in List A cricket.
- Points: Limpopo 4, Northern Cape 0

1 March 2026
09:30
Scorecard

Border; 273/8 (50 overs)	v	Mpumalanga; 145 (29.1 overs)
Lihle Sizani 90 (125); Aubrey Swanepoel 3/44 (9 overs)		Yassar Cook 32 (39); Nico van Zyl 3/31 (6 overs)

Border won by 98 runs (DLS method)
Uplands College, White River
Umpires: Gladman Gaseba and Khawulani Ntuli

- Border won the toss and elected to bat.
- Points: Border 5, Mpumalanga 0

4 March 2026
09:30
Scorecard

Border; 306/5 (50 overs)	v	Easterns; 247 (48 overs)
Mncedisi Malika 86* (61); Amaan Khan 2/68 (10 overs)		Dewan Marais 110 (93); Nico van Zyl 4/17 (9 overs)

Border won by 59 runs
Buffalo Park, East London
Umpires: Muhammad Jooma and Jurie Sadler

- Border won the toss and elected to bat.
- Dewan Marais (Easterns) scored his maiden century in List A cricket.
- Points: Border 4, Easterns 0

4 March 2026
10:00
Scorecard

Mpumalanga; 229/7 (38 overs)	v	Limpopo; 237/1 (36 overs)
Zakir Kathrada 53 (71); Ludwig Kaestner 3/25 (5 overs)		Tylor Trenoweth 132* (103); Tetelo Maphaka 1/21 (8 overs)

Limpopo won by 9 wickets (DLS method)
Cricket Club Ground, Polokwane
Umpires: Gladman Gaseba and Waldo Lategan

- Limpopo won the toss and elected to field.
- Tylor Trenoweth (Limpopo) scored his maiden century in List A cricket.
- Points: Limpopo 4, Mpumalanga 0

4 March 2026
10:00
Scorecard

South Africa Emerging Players	v	Northern Cape

Match abandoned
Tuks Cricket Oval, Pretoria

- No toss.
- No play was possible due to rain.
- Points: South Africa Emerging Players 2, Northern Cape 2

5 March 2026
10:00
Scorecard

Knights; 250/8 (50 overs)	v	South Western Districts; 251/3 (39.2 overs)
Jacques Snyman 46 (59); Sintu Majeza 3/53 (8 overs)		Ruan Terblanche 133 (112); Malusi Siboto 3/45 (10 overs)

South Western Districts won by 7 wickets
Recreation Ground, Oudtshoorn
Umpires: Andre Olivier and Keagan Williams

- Knight won the toss and elected to bat.
- Jade Richter (South Western Districts) made his List A cricket.
- Points: South Western Districts 5, Knights 0

7 March 2026
10:00
Scorecard

Limpopo	v	Easterns

Match abandoned
Cricket Club Ground, Polokwane

- No toss.
- No play was possible due to rain.
- Points: Limpopo 2, Easterns 2

8 March 2026
10:00
Scorecard

South Western Districts; 252 (47.5 overs)	v	Border; 254/3 (43.3 overs)
Pheko Moletsane 45 (49); Nico van Zyl 3/36 (10 overs)		Nathan Roux 104* (114); Banele Cele 1/44 (10 overs)

Border won by 7 wickets
Buffalo Park, East London
Umpires: Jan Erasmus and Dan van der Merwe

- South Western Districts won the toss and elected to bat.
- Points: Border 4, South Western Districts 0

8 March 2026
10:00
Scorecard

Knights; 307 (50 overs)	v	Northern Cape; 249/9 (50 overs)
Isaac Dikgale 117 (137); Odirile Modimokoane 2/47 (9 overs)		Morne Venter 73 (105); Sithembile Langa 4/44 (10 overs)

Knights won by 58 runs
Mangaung Oval, Bloemfontein
Umpires: Bongani Jele and Willhelm Nell

- Knights won the toss and elected to bat.
- Isaac Dikgale (Knights) scored his maiden century in List A cricket.
- Points: Knights 4, Northern Cape 0

8 March 2026
10:00
Scorecard

Mpumalanga; 277/8 (50 overs)	v	South Africa Emerging Players; 170 (37.1 overs)
Yassar Cook 75 (109); David Teeger 3/52 (10 overs)		Armaan Manack 69 (75); Jon Hinrichsen 5/33 (8 overs)

Mpumalanga won by 107 runs
Tuks Cricket Oval, Pretoria
Umpires: Khawulani Ntuli and Mthokozisi Shezi

- Mpumalanga won the toss and elected to bat.
- Points: Mpumalanga 5, South Africa Emerging Players 0

11 March 2026
10:00
Scorecard

South Western Districts; 71 (21.1 overs)	v	South Africa Emerging Players; 74/0 (12.4 overs)
Paul James 45 (51); Banele Cele 7/19 (10 overs)		Yaseen Valli 38* (48)

South Western Districts won by 10 wickets
Recreation Ground, Oudtshoorn
Umpires: Evan van der Merwe and Andre Olivier

- Daniel Bosman (South Africa Emerging Players) and Nathan Engelbrecht (South Western Districts)
- Banele Cele (South Western Districts) took his five-wicket haul in List A cricket.
- Points: South Western Districts 5, South Africa Emerging Players 0

11 March 2026
10:00
Scorecard

Knights; 398/5 (50 overs)	v	Easterns; 215 (32.1 overs)
Jacques Snyman 156 (111); Jesse Albanie 3/69 (10 overs)		Dewan Marais 60 (52); Mbongiseni Mhlanga 3/41 (6.1 overs)

Knights won by 183 runs
Willowmoore Park, Benoni
Umpires: Muhammad Jooma and Jurie Sadler

- Easterns won the toss and elected to field.
- Points: Knights 5, Easterns 0

11 March 2026
09:30
Scorecard

Mpumalanga; 256/9 (50 overs)	v	Northern Cape; 155 (37.1 overs)
Zakir Kathrada 73 (83); Odirile Modimokoane 2/38 (10 overs)		Orapeleng Motlhoaring 37 (45); Aubrey Swanepoel 3/37 (9 overs)

Mpumalanga won by 101 runs
Uplands College, White River
Umpires: Khawulani Ntuli and Waldo Lategan

- Mpumalanga won the toss and elected to bat.
- Ruan van Rooyen (Northern Cape) made his List A cricket.
- Points: Mpumalanga 5, Northern Cape 0

12 March 2026
10:00
Scorecard

Limpopo; 218/9 (50 overs)	v	Border; 219/6 (39.5 overs)
Sizwe Masondo 79* (103); Chad Classen 2/41 (8 overs)		Jason Niemand 53 (51); Emmanuel Motswiri 3/54 (9 overs)

Border won by 4 wickets
Buffalo Park, East London
Umpires: Gladman Gaseba and Keagan Williams

- Limpopo won the toss and elected bat.
- Points: Border 5, Limpopo 0

14 March 2026
10:00
Scorecard

Mpumalanga; 301/7 (50 overs)	v	Knights; 125 (34.4 overs)
Benjamin van Niekerk 80 (81); Sithembile Langa 3/61 (10 overs)		Seth Fledermaus 31 (41); Gareth Dukes 3/19 (8 overs)

Mpumalanga won by 176 runs
Mangaung Oval, Bloemfontein
Umpires: Roger Burne and Willhelm Nell

- Mpumalanga won the toss and elected to bat.
- Points: Mpumalanga 5, Knights 0

14 March 2026
10:00
Scorecard

South Africa Emerging Players; 228/9 (50 overs)	v	Easterns; 229/3 (34 overs)
Jorich Van Schalkwyk 41 (70); Tumelo Simelane 3/43 (10 overs)		Christopher Britz 90* (84); Jason Rowles 1/27 (5 overs)

Easterns won by 7 wickets
Willowmoore Park, Benoni
Umpires: Heinrich Killian and Mthokozisi Shezi

- South Africa Emerging Players won the toss and elected to bat.
- Points: Easterns 5, South Africa Emerging Players 0

15 March 2026
10:00
Scorecard

South Western Districts; 299/6 (50 overs)	v	Limpopo; 266 (47.2 overs)
Kyle Jacobs 131 (141); Emmanuel Motswiri 5/77 (10 overs)		Emmanuel Motswiri 59 (70); Jade Richter 4/34 (6.2 overs)

South Western Districts won by 33 runs
Recreation Ground, Oudtshoorn
Umpires: Dan van der Merwe and Keagan Williams

- Limpopo won the toss and elected field.
- Points: South Western Districts 4, Limpopo 0

15 March 2026
10:00
Scorecard

Border; 250/9 (50 overs)	v	Northern Cape; 203 (46.2 overs)
Thando Ntini 45 (56); Charl Prinsloo 3/64 (10 overs)		Charl Prinsloo 43* (38); Kgaudisa Molefe 5/40 (9.2 overs)

Border won by 47 runs
De Beers Diamond Oval, Kimberley
Umpires: Khawulani Ntuli and Jurie Sadler

- Northern Cape won the toss and elected field.
- Tristan van Rensburg and James Ritchie (Northern Cape) both made their List A debuts.
- Points: Border 4, Northern Cape 0

== Knockout stage ==
=== Division One ===
Qualifier			Final
			1	Lions	248/9 (50 overs)
2	Warriors	204 (49.3 overs)	QW	Titans	249/7 (49.5 overs)
3	Titans	209/6 (43.1 overs)

Qualifier
25 March 2026
13:00 (D/N)
Scorecard

Warriors; 204 (49.3 overs)	v	Titans; 209/6 (43.1 overs)
Muhammad Manack 80 (99); Roelof van der Merwe 3/32 (9.3 overs)		Keagan Lion-Cachet 57* (42); Patrick Kruger 2/28 (8 overs)

Titans won by 4 wickets
St George's Park Cricket Ground, Gqeberha
Umpires: Siphelele Gasa and Brad White

- Titans won the toss and elected to field.

Final
29 March 2026
13:00 (D/N)
Scorecard

Lions; 248/9 (50 overs)	v	Titans; 249/7 (49.5 overs)
Rassie van der Dussen 57 (86); Lizaad Williams 3/49 (10 overs)		Keegan Petersen 90 (134); Codi Yusuf 3/43 (10 overs)

Titans won by 3 wickets
Wanderers Stadium, Johannesburg
Umpires: Stephen Harris and Bongani Jele

- Lions won the toss and elected to bat.

=== Division Two ===
Qualifier			Final
			1	Knights	149/5 (36.2 overs)
2	Border	179/4 (37 overs)	QW	Border	148 (38.5 overs)
3	Mpumalanga	178 (43.2 overs)

Qualifier
18 March 2026
10:00
Scorecard

Mpumalanga; 178 (43.2 overs)	v	Border; 179/4 (37 overs)
Yassar Cook 54 (105); Thando Ntini 3/32 (7.2 overs)		Michael Copeland 59* (76); B Brokensha 2/31 (7 overs)

Border won by 6 wickets
Buffalo Park, East London
Umpires: Jan Erasmus and Khawulani Ntuli

- Mpumalanga won the toss and elected to bat.

Final
22 March 2026
10:00
Scorecard

Border; 148 (38.5 overs)	v	Knights; 149/5 (36.2 overs)
Wian Ruthven 50 (60); Dane Piedt 4/29 (10 overs)		Jacques Snyman 36 (28); Kgaudisa Molefe 2/29 (5.2 overs)

Knights won by 5 wickets
Mangaung Oval, Bloemfontein
Umpires: Kerrin Klaaste and Mthokozisi Shezi

- Knights won the toss and elected to field.

== See also ==
- 2025–26 CSA T20 Knock-Out Competition
- 2025–26 CSA 4-Day Series
- 2025–26 CSA T20 Challenge
