= CSA Provincial T20 Challenge =

South African cricket tournament

- Countries: South Africa
- Administrator: Cricket South Africa
- Format: Twenty20
- First edition: 2011–12
- Latest edition: 2015-16
- Tournament format: Double round-robin, qualifier and final
- Number of teams: 14
- Current champion: KZN Inland (2 titles)
- Most successful: KZN Inland (2 titles)

The CSA Provincial T20 is a Twenty20 Cricket competition in South Africa, first contested in the 2011–12 season. It was previously known as the CSA Provincial T20 until the season, the CSA Provincial T20 Challenge for the 2014-15 season and most recently as the competition was itself cancelled in favour of the CSA Provincial T20 Cup from 2019–20.

The tournament has been contested since its inception by the 14 Domestic teams but for the In April 2019, Cricket South Africa announced that the 2019-20 tournament would be the final edition of the CSA Provincial T20 Challenge, due to austerity measures and a restructure of domestic cricket in the country.

== Teams and venues ==
Map of the venues for matches played in the 2016–17 CSA Provincial competitions

Home team	Stadium	City	Capacity
Boland	Boland Bank Park	Paarl	10,000
Boland	Brackenfell Sports Fields	Brackenfell	
Border	Buffalo Park	East London	15,000
Eastern Province	St George's Park	Port Elizabeth	19,000
Easterns	Willowmoore Park	Benoni	20,000
Free State	Chevrolet Park	Bloemfontein	20,000
Gauteng	Wanderers Stadium	Johannesburg	34,000
KwaZulu-Natal	Kingsmead	Durban	25,000
KwaZulu-Natal Inland	City Oval	Pietermaritzburg	12,000
Northern Cape	De Beers Diamond Oval	Kimberley	11,000
Northerns	SuperSport Park	Centurion	20,000
Northerns	LC de Villiers Oval	Pretoria	2,000
North West	Senwes Park	Potchefstroom	9,000
South Western Districts	Recreation Ground	Oudtshoorn	
Western Province	Newlands	Cape Town	22,500
Namibia	Sparta Cricket Club Ground	Walvis Bay	
Namibia	Wanderers Cricket Ground	Windhoek	

== Tournament results ==
=== List of winners ===
Season	Final venue	Result			Ref
Season	Final venue	Winner	Margin	Runner-up	Ref
2011–12	Port Elizabeth	Northerns; 154/5 (20 overs)	Northerns won by 16 runs scorecard	Eastern Province; 138/9 (20 overs)	
2012–13	no final	Free State; 32 points	Free State won on points table	Gauteng; 25 points	
2013–14	Johannesburg	KZN Inland; 132/2 (17.2 overs)	KZN Inland won by 8 wickets scorecard	Gauteng (2); 128/7 (20 overs)	
2014–15	no final	Gauteng; 17 points	Gauteng won on points table	Northerns; 13 points	
2015–16	no final	KZN Inland (2); 18 points	KZN Inland won on points table	Eastern Province (2); 17 points	

== Team performance ==
Legend

- 1st – Champions
- 2nd – Runners-up
- 3rd – Third place
- SF – Losing semi-finalist (no third-place playoff)

Team	2011–12	2012–13	2013–14	2014–15	2015–16	Total
Boland	8th	14th	10th	13th	14th	6
Border	13th	7th	5th	7th	7th	6
Eastern Province	2nd	5th	12th	11th	2nd	6
Easterns	11th	11th	13th	12th	11th	6
Free State	4th	1st	8th	14th	3rd	6
Gauteng	9th	2nd	2nd	1st	13th	6
KwaZulu-Natal	7th	4th	11th	5th	8th	6
KZN Inland	12th	12th	1st	10th	1st	6
Limpopo	–	–	–	–	–	1
Mpumalanga	–	–	–	–	–	1
Namibia	14th	8th	14th	3rd	12th	5
Northern Cape (Griqualand West)	5th	3rd	3rd	4th	10th	6
Northerns	1st	6th	9th	2nd	5th	6
North West	3rd	13th	4th	9th	9th	6
SW Districts	10th	9th	7th	8th	6th	6
Western Province	6th	10th	6th	6th	4th	6

== See also ==
- SA20
- CSA T20 Challenge
- CSA Provincial T20 Cup
