= CSA T20 Knock-Out Competition =

South African cricket tournament

- Countries: South Africa
- Administrator: Cricket South Africa
- Format: Twenty20
- First edition: 2019-20
- Latest edition: 2025–26
- Tournament format: Group stage and knockout
- Number of teams: 7
- Current champion: Knights (2 title)
- 2025–26 CSA T20 Knock-Out Competition

The CSA T20 Knock-Out Competition is a professional domestic Twenty20 Cricket competition in South Africa. The competition was established by Cricket South Africa (CSA) in 2019. It is the second-level Twenty20 competition in South Africa. it was replaced in 2026 by the Pro20 Cup.

At first it was played between the 15 South African provincial teams, along with Limpopo and Mpumalanga. This was the sixth edition of the CSA Provincial T20 Cup, which was last played in the 2015–16 season. With only domestic teams from South Africa taking part, the tournament returned in place of the Africa T20 Cup, which had been held since 2015. the national under-19 team.

The competition was discontinued following the 2025–26 season as part of Cricket South Africa's restructuring of domestic cricket. From the 2026–27 season, the CSA T20 Knock-Out and CSA T20 Challenge were merged into a new competition, the Pro20 Cup.

== Teams ==
Current Teams 2023
Team	Location	Province
Border	Buffalo Park, East London	Eastern Cape
Easterns	Willowmoore Park, Benoni	Gauteng
KwaZulu-Natal (Inland)	City Oval, Pietermaritzburg	KwaZulu-Natal
Limpopo	Polokwane Cricket Club, Polokwane	Limpopo
Mpumalanga	Uplands College, White River	Mpumalanga
Northern Cape	De Beers Diamond Oval, Kimberley	Northern Cape
South Western Districts	Recreation Ground, Oudtshoorn	Western Cape

== Tournament results ==
CSA Provincial T20 Cup
Season	Venue	Final			No. of teams
Season	Venue	Winners	Result	Runners-up	No. of teams
2019–20	Willowmoore Park, Benoni	Easterns; 178 for 6 (20 overs)	won by 5 runs Scorecard	KwaZulu-Natal Inland; 173 for 4 (20 overs)	15
2021–22	Diamond Oval, Kimberley	Knights; 176 for 5 (20 overs)	won by 7 runs Scorecard	Dolphins; 169 for 6 (20 overs)	16
2022–23	Buffalo Park, East London	South Africa U-19; 142 for 6 (19.1 overs)	won by 4 wickets Scorecard	Northern Cape; 141 for 5 (20 overs)	8
2023–24	Polokwane Cricket Club Ground, Polokwane	Limpopo; 136 for 4 (18.4 overs)	won by 6 wickets Scorecard	Northern Cape; 132 for 9 (20 overs)	7
2024–25	Willowmoore Park, Benoni	KwaZulu-Natal (Inland); 130 for 3 (18.2 overs)	won by 7 wickets Scorecard	Easterns; 129 for 9 (20 overs)	7
2025–26
2026–27

== See also ==
- SA20
- CSA T20 Challenge
- CSA Provincial T20 Challenge
