= Africa T20 Cup =

- Countries: South Africa (15 teams); Kenya (1 team); Namibia (1 team); Zimbabwe (1 team); Uganda (1 team); Nigeria (1 team)
- Administrator: Cricket South Africa
- Format: Twenty20
- First edition: 2015
- Latest edition: 2018
- Tournament format: Group stage, finals
- Number of teams: 20
- TV: SuperSport
- Website: cricket.co.za

The Africa T20 Cup was a Twenty20 cricket tournament organised by Cricket South Africa. It featured a combination of South African provincial teams and teams representing other African countries, including Kenya, Namibia, and Zimbabwe. It ran for four years before being replaced by the CSA Provincial T20 Cup.

The first edition of the tournament was played in September and October 2015, as a precursor to the 2015–16 South African domestic season. It was won by Northerns, which defeated KwaZulu-Natal Inland in the final by seven wickets. The second edition of the tournament was played in September and October 2016. It was won by Eastern Province, who defeated Northern Cape in the final by 31 runs.

== Background ==
The Africa T20 Cup has been characterised as "essentially a showcase in cricket development". The South African teams have various restrictions on the composition of their squads – they had to feature no more than four players from the professional franchises, at least two players under the age of 21, and at least six players of colour (including at least three Black Africans). The Africa T20 Cup partially filled the gap left in the South African calendar by the cancellation of the Champions League Twenty20. The SuperSport television network, a major sponsor of Cricket South Africa, was the tournament's broadcaster.

== Expansion ==
In 2016, it was suggested that the Africa T20 Cup would be expanded in the future to include other African countries, such as Uganda. For the 2018 edition, the number of teams was increased from 16 to 20, with the addition of the South African teams of Limpopo and Mpumalanga, along with national representation from Ghana and Nigeria. However, Ghana declined Cricket South Africa's invite to compete in the tournament, and were replaced by Uganda.

== Results ==
Year	Teams	Final venue	Result		
Year	Teams	Final venue	Winner	Margin	Runner-up
2015	16	Mangaung Oval, Bloemfontein	Northerns; 107/3 (18 overs)	Northerns won by 7 wickets scorecard	KwaZulu-Natal Inland; 103/8 (20 overs)
2016	16	Recreation Ground, Oudtshoorn	Eastern Province; 165/6 (20 overs)	Eastern Province won by 31 runs scorecard	Northern Cape; 134/9 (20 overs)
2017	16	Diamond Oval, Kimberley	KwaZulu-Natal Inland; 129/4 (17.5 overs)	KwaZulu-Natal Inland won by 6 wickets scorecard	Free State; 128/5 (20 overs)
2018	20	Buffalo Park, East London	Gauteng; 131/7 (19.2 overs)	Gauteng won by 3 wickets scorecard	Border; 130 (20 overs)

== Teams ==
- Boland
- Border
- Eastern Province
- Easterns
- Free State
- Gauteng
- Kenya
- KwaZulu-Natal
- KwaZulu-Natal Inland
- Limpopo
- Mpumalanga
- Namibia
- Nigeria
- Northern Cape
- Northerns
- North West
- South Western Districts
- Uganda
- Western Province
- Zimbabwe/Zimbabwe Development XI

== See also ==
- CSA Provincial Competitions
- Ram Slam T20 Challenge
