= 2024 CSA Provincial T20 Cup =

2024 CSA Provincial T20 Cup may refer to:

- 2024 CSA Provincial T20 Cup (March), held from 6 March to 7 April
- 2024 CSA Provincial T20 Cup (October), held from 21 September to 20 October

== See also ==
- CSA Provincial T20 Cup
