= Ronan Herrmann =

South African cricketer (born 2003)

Ronan Herrmann (December 5, 2003) is a South African cricketer born in Johannesburg. He plays as a wicket-keeper and right-handed batter.

== Career ==
He attended high school at Hoërskool Noordheuwel. From there, he was selected to represent Gauteng at the Khaya Majola Cricket Week for 2021/22.

He went on to be selected for South Africa at under-19 level, playing in the 2022 Under-19 Cricket World Cup. He played in two matches as an opening batter, scoring 80 runs.

His first senior representation was for Gauteng in 2021/22 in division one. Since 2024, he has played for Northern Cape in division two.

At Northern Cape he was the third highest runs-scorer (and highest for Northern Cape) in the CSA 4-Day Series Division Two for 2025/26.

For the coming 2026/27 season, he is transferring to Easterns, also in division two.

Along with provincial representation, he was also signed to Joburg Super Kings as a rookie for the 2024 SA20. He scored 15 runs in two matches. He did not play in the next two seasons.
