= Gordon Parsons =

Gordon Parsons may refer to:

- Gordon Parsons (cricketer) (born 1959), English cricketer
- Gordon Parsons (singer-songwriter) (1926–1990), Australian country music singer-songwriter
