= South African cricket team in Zimbabwe in 2014 =

International cricket tour

| | Zimbabwe | South Africa |
- Dates: 9 August 2014 – 21 August 2014
| Captains | Brendan Taylor | Hashim Amla (Tests); AB de Villiers (ODIs) |

Test series
- Result: South Africa won the 1-match series 1–0
| Most runs | Brendan Taylor (98) | Faf du Plessis (103) |
| Most wickets | John Nyumbu (5) | Dale Steyn, Dane Piedt (8) |
- Player of the series: Dane Piedt (SA)

One Day International series
- Results: South Africa won the 3-match series 3–0
| Most runs | Elton Chigumbura (133) | Quinton de Kock (185) |
| Most wickets | John Nyumbu (4) | Wayne Parnell (7) |
- Player of the series: Quinton de Kock (SA)

The South Africa cricket team toured Zimbabwe from 9 to 21 August 2014, playing one Test match and three One Day International (ODI) matches against the Zimbabwean team. South Africa won the one-off Test match and won the ODI series 3–0, winning all of the matches by comfortable margins.

== Squads ==
| Tests | | ODIs | |
| Zimbabwe | South Africa | Zimbabwe | South Africa |
|---|---|---|---|
| Brendan Taylor (c) (wk); Regis Chakabva (wk); Tendai Chatara; Elton Chigumbura; Hamilton Masakadza; Cuthbert Musoko; Richmond Mutumbami; John Nyumbu; Tinashe Panyangara; Vusi Sibanda; Sikandar Raza; Donald Tiripano; Mark Vermeulen; Malcolm Waller; Sean Williams | Hashim Amla (c); Alviro Petersen; Dean Elgar; Faf du Plessis; AB de Villiers (vc); JP Duminy; Stiaan van Zyl; Wayne Parnell; Vernon Philander; Morne Morkel; Dale Steyn; Imran Tahir; Kyle Abbott; Quinton de Kock (wk); Dane Piedt | Elton Chigumbura(c); Sikandar Raza Butt; Luke Jongwe; Tafadzwa Kamungozi; Neville Madziva; Timycen Maruma; Hamilton Masakadza; Shingi Masakadza; Richmond Mutumbami; John Nyumbu; Tinashe Panyangara; Vusi Sibanda; Brendan Taylor (wk); Prosper Utseya; Brian Vitori; Malcolm Waller; Sean Williams | AB de Villiers (c); Hashim Amla; Kyle Abbott; Quinton de Kock (wk); Marchant de Lange; JP Duminy; Faf du Plessis; Beuran Hendricks; Imran Tahir; Ryan McLaren; David Miller; Wayne Parnell; Aaron Phangiso; Rilee Rossouw; Mthokozisi Shezi |

== Test series ==
=== Only Test ===
9–13 August
Scorecard

| Zimbabwe | v | South Africa |
| 256 (92.4 overs); Brendan Taylor 93 (159); Dale Steyn 5/46 (22.4 overs) | | 397 (158.3 overs); Faf du Plessis 98 (264); John Nyumbu 5/157 (49.3 overs) |
| 181 (76.2 overs); Richmond Mutumbami 43 (69); Dane Piedt 4/62 (25 overs) | | 44/1 (10.4 overs); Dean Elgar 21 (28); Tendai Chatara 1/5 (2 overs) |

South Africa won by 9 wickets
Harare Sports Club, Harare
Umpires: Aleem Dar (Pak) and Chris Gaffaney (NZ)
Player of the match: Dane Piedt (SA)

- Zimbabwe won the tos and chose to bat
- Dane Piedt (SA), John Nyumbu (Zim) and Donald Tiripano (Zim) all made their Test debuts.
- Chris Gaffaney (NZ) stood in his first Test match as an umpire.
- John Nyumbu's five-wicket haul was only the 2nd five-wicket haul on Test debut by a Zimbabwean after Andy Blignaut's five-for in 2001.

== ODI series ==
=== 1st ODI ===
17 August 2014
Scorecard

| South Africa; 309/3 (50 overs) | v | Zimbabwe; 216 (49.5 overs) |
| Hashim Amla 122* (132); John Nyumbu 2/52 (8 overs) | | Hamilton Masakadza 61 (75); Aaron Phangiso 3/43 (9.5 overs) |

South Africa won by 93 runs
Queens Sports Club, Bulawayo
Umpires: Chris Gaffaney (NZ) and Russell Tiffin (Zim)
Player of the match: Hashim Amla (SA)

- Zimbabwe won the toss and elected to field.
- Luke Jongwe, Neville Madziva and John Nyumbu (all Zim) made their ODI debuts.

=== 2nd ODI ===
19 August 2014
Scorecard

| South Africa; 257 (49.4 overs) | v | Zimbabwe; 196 (49.1 overs) |
| Faf du Plessis 55 (72); Sean Williams 2/37 (9.4 overs) | | Sean Williams 55 (84); Ryan McLaren 3/21 (8 overs) |

South Africa won by 61 runs
Queens Sports Club, Bulawayo
Umpires: Owen Chirombe (Zim) and Chris Gaffaney (NZ)
Player of the match: Wayne Parnell (SA)

- Zimbabwe won the toss and elected to field.

=== 3rd ODI ===
21 August 2014
Scorecard

| Zimbabwe; 165 (39.5 overs) | v | South Africa; 171/3 (27.2 overs) |
| Elton Chigumbura 90 (122); Marchant de Lange 3/31 (7.5 overs) | | Quinton de Kock 84 (75); Sean Williams 1/1 (2 overs) |

South Africa won by 7 wickets
Queens Sports Club, Bulawayo
Umpires: Chris Gaffaney (NZ) and Jeremiah Matibiri (Zim)
Player of the match: Quinton de Kock (SA)

- South Africa won the toss and elected to field.
- Rilee Rossouw and Mthokozisi Shezi (both SA) made their ODI debuts.
