= De Beers Stadium =

Cricket stadium in Kimberley, Northern Cape, South Africa

- Interactive map of De Beers Stadium

Ground information
- Location: Kimberley
- Country: South Africa
- Coordinates: 28.72670°S 24.77685°E

International information

Team information
Griqualand West	(1927–1973)
- As of 9 March 2018; Source: CricketArchive

The De Beers Stadium in Kimberley, Northern Cape, South Africa was the home ground of the Griqualand West (now called Northern Cape) cricket team from 1927 to 1973. It staged a total of 88 first-class matches, in all of which Griqualand West was the home team. Their opponents were usually rival teams in the Currie Cup and the venue also hosted international touring teams including Marylebone Cricket Club (MCC), the Australians and the New Zealanders. With Griqualand West departing in 1973, only two List A matches were held there. Griqualand West moved to the new multi-purpose De Beers Diamond Oval ahead of the 1973–74 season (the team was renamed Northern Cape in 2015).

The stadium is a multi-purpose athletics stadium and possesses facilities for track and field athletic events, a football field and a sports hall in which indoor hockey and indoor football are played.
