= 2025–26 CSA T20 Challenge =

Cricket tournament

- Dates: 29 October – 30 November 2025
- Administrator: Cricket South Africa
- Cricket format: Twenty20
- Tournament format(s): Round-robin and knockout
- Host: South Africa
- Champions: Warriors (2nd title)
- Runners-up: Boland
- Participants: 8
- Matches: 32
- Most runs: Matthew De Villiers (394)
- Most wickets: Imran Manack (15)

The 2025–26 CSA T20 Challenge was the 22nd season of the CSA T20 Challenge, organized by Cricket South Africa in South Africa. The tournament ran from 29 October to 30 November 2025, the date of the final. Lions were the defending champion.

== Teams and squads ==
Gbets Rocks Boland	Hollywoodbets Dolphins	ACDC Express Tuskers	DP World Lions	North West Dragons	Momentum Multiply Titans	Dafabet Warriors	Western Province
Head Coaches
Justin Ontong	Quinton Friend	Ahmed Amla	Russell Domingo	Craig Alexander	Rivash Gobind	Robin Peterson	Rory Kleinveldt
Captains
Players

== Standing ==
Pos	Team	Pld	W	L	NR	Pts	NRR	Qualification
1	Boland	7	6	1	0	26	0.567	Advance to Qualifier 1
2	Warriors	7	5	1	1	26	2.168	Advance to Qualifier 1
3	Dolphins	7	5	2	0	22	0.716	Advance to Eliminator
4	Western Province	7	4	3	0	18	0.344	Advance to Eliminator
5	North West	7	2	4	1	10	−0.447	
6	Titans	7	2	4	1	10	−2.035	
7	Lions	7	1	5	1	6	−0.174	
8	KwaZulu-Natal Inland	7	1	6	0	4	−1.330	

Source: ESPNcricinfo, SuperSport

== Fixtures ==
Match 1
29 October 2025
12:00
Scorecard

Titans; 151/7 (20 overs)	v	KwaZulu-Natal Inland; 142 (19.3 overs)
Keagan Lion-Cachet 54 (35); Wayne Parnell 3/28 (4 overs)		Ntando Zuma 43 (33); Dayyaan Galiem 2/17 (3.3 overs)

Titans won by 9 runs
City Oval, Pietermaritzburg
Umpires: Mazizi Gampu and Lubabalo Gcuma

- Titans won the toss and elected to bat.
- Lethabo Phahlamohlaka (Titans) made his T20 debut.
- Points: Titans 4, KwaZulu-Natal Inland 0

Match 2
29 October 2025
13:30
Scorecard

North West	v	Warriors

Match abandoned
JB Marks Oval, Potchefstroom

- No toss.
- No play was possible due to rain.
- Points: North West 2, Warriors 2

Match 3
31 October 2025
18:00 (D/N)
Scorecard

Boland; 148/9 (20 overs)	v	North West; 139/9 (20 overs)
Clyde Reeves-Fortuin 49 (34); Shimane Mothoa 3/32 (4 overs)		Janneman Malan 50 (49); Keith Dudgeon 3/21 (3 overs)

Boland won by 9 runs
Boland Park, Paarl
Umpires: Arno Jacobs and Abdoellah Steenkamp

- North West won the toss and elected to field.
- Gysbert Wege (Boland) made his T20 debut.
- Points: Boland 4, North West 0

Match 4
1 November 2025
12:00
Scorecard

Dolphins; 178/5 (20 overs)	v	KwaZulu-Natal Inland; 164/7 (20 overs)
Gomolemo Phiri 64* (32); Sean Gilson 1/9 (2 overs)		Sean Gilson 55 (33); Anrich Nortje 2/27 (4 overs)

Dolphins won by 14 runs
Kingsmead Cricket Ground, Durban
Umpires: Dennis Smith and Abongile Sodumo

- KwaZulu-Natal Inland won the toss and elected to field.
- Aryan Gopalan and Gomolemo Phiri (Dolphins) both made their T20 debuts.
- Points: Dolphins 4, KwaZulu-Natal Inland 0

Match 5
1 November 2025
13:30
Scorecard

Warriors; 193/3 (20 overs)	v	Titans; 107 (17.1 overs)
JP King 76* (43); Marco Jansen 2/29 (4 overs)		Keagan Lion-Cachet 25 (21); Matthew Boast 4/23 (3.1 overs)

Warriors won by 86 runs
Centurion Park, Centurion
Umpires: Siphelele Gasa and Andre Olivier

- Titans won the toss and elected to field.
- Josh Jordaan (Titans) and Matthew De Villiers (Warriors) both made their T20 debuts.
- Points: Warriors 5, Titans 0

Match 6
2 November 2025
12:00
Scorecard

North West; 186/5 (20 overs)	v	Western Province; 188/6 (16.5 overs)
Diego Rosier 73 (48); Oliver Whitehead 2/41 (4 overs)		Daniel Smith 80 (26); Onke Nyaku 3/29 (4 overs)

Western Province won by 4 wickets
Newlands Cricket Ground, Cape Town
Umpires: Marais Erasmus and Warren Wyngaard

- Western Province won the toss and elected to field.
- Josh Breed and Mbulelo Dube (Western Province) both made their T20 debuts.
- Points: Western Province 4, North West 0

Match 7
2 November 2025
13:30
Scorecard

Boland; 138 (18 overs)	v	Lions; 130/6 (20 overs)
Lehan Botha 42 (36); Beyers Swanepoel 4/27 (4 overs)		Delano Potgieter 46* (29); Akhona Mnyaka 3/19 (4 overs)

Boland won by 8 runs
Wanderers Stadium, Johannesburg
Umpires: Thomas Mokorosi and Brad White

- Lions won the toss and elected to field.
- Khaya Fakude and Rafeeq Patel (Lions) both made their T20 debuts.
- Points: Boland 4, Lions 0

Match 8
4 November 2025
18:00 (D/N)
Scorecard

Boland; 173/5 (20 overs)	v	Western Province; 108 (16 overs)
Lehan Botha 52* (36); Josh Breed 3/31 (4 overs)		Juan James 52 (33); Keith Dudgeon 3/11 (3 overs)

Boland won by 65 runs
Boland Park, Paarl
Umpires: Marais Erasmus and Abongile Sodumo

- Boland won the toss and elected to bat.
- Points: Boland 5, Western Province 0

Match 9
6 November 2025
18:00 (D/N)
Scorecard

Titans; 128/8 (20 overs)	v	Boland; 129/3 (13.4 overs)
Josh Jordaan 39 (34); Glenton Stuurman 2/16 (4 overs)		Clyde Fortuin 50 (32); Dayyaan Galiem 1/24 (2 overs)

Boland won by 7 wickets
Boland Park, Paarl
Umpires: Lauren Agenbag and Marais Erasmus

- Titans won the toss and elected to bat.
- Janco Smit (Titans) made his T20 debut.
- Points: Boland 5, Titans 0

Match 10
7 November 2025
17:00 (D/N)
Scorecard

Western Province; 134/9 (20 overs)	v	Warriors; 135/4 (15.3 overs)
Juan James 32 (21); Wesley Bedja 4/22 (4 overs)		Matthew De Villiers 61 (43); Josh Breed 2/26 (4 overs)

Warriors won by 6 wickets
St George's Park, Gqeberha
Umpires: Arno Jacobs and Abdoellah Steenkamp

- Western Province won the toss and elected to bat.
- Raeeq Daniels (Western Province) made his T20 debut.
- Points: Warriors 5, Western Province 0

Match 11
7 November 2025
18:00 (D/N)
Scorecard

Dolphins; 155/9 (17 overs)	v	North West; 124 (17 overs)
Leus du Plooy 60 (31); Alfred Mothoa 3/26 (4 overs)		Lesiba Ngoepe 28 (11); Eathan Bosch 4/27 (3 overs)

Dolphins won by 31 runs
JB Marks Oval, Potchefstroom
Umpires: Mazizi Gampu and Brad White

- North West won the toss and elected to field.
- The match was reduced to 17 overs per side due to rain.
- Points: Dolphins 4, North West 0

Match 12
8 November 2025
13:00
Scorecard

KwaZulu-Natal Inland; 161/5 (20 overs)	v	Lions; 159/5 (20 overs)
Cameron Shekleton 56 (37); Beyers Swanepoel 2/24 (4 overs)		Reeza Hendricks 61 (44); Wayne Parnell 2/29 (4 overs)

KwaZulu-Natal Inland won by 2 runs
Wanderers Stadium, Johannesburg
Umpires: Siphelele Gasa and Bongani Jele

- Lions won the toss and elected to field.
- Points: KwaZulu-Natal Inland 4, Lions 0

Match 13
9 November 2025
13:30
Scorecard

Western Province; 225/6 (20 overs)	v	Titans; 141 (17.4 overs)
Edward Moore 105 (53); Duan Jansen 3/22 (4 overs)		Dayyaan Galiem 42 (22); Mthiwekhaya Nabe 4/19 (4 overs)

Western Province won by 84 runs
Newlands Cricket Ground, Cape Town
Umpires: Stephen Harris and Warren Wyngaard

- Titans won the toss and elected to field.
- Points: Western Province 5, Titans 0

Match 14
9 November 2025
12:00
Scorecard

Warriors; 94 (19.1 overs)	v	Dolphins; 100/3 (14.2 overs)
Patrick Kruger 32 (36); Andile Simelane 3/13 (3.1 overs)		Tshepang Dithole 39 (37); Aphiwe Mnyanda 3/19 (3 overs)

Dolphins won by 7 wickets
Kingsmead Cricket Ground, Durban
Umpires: Lubabalo Gcuma and Dennis Smith

- Dolphins won the toss and elected to field.
- Points: Dolphins 6, Warriors 0

Match 15
11 November 2025
18:00 (D/N)
Scorecard

Lions; 146/7 (20 overs)	v	Warriors; 151/2 (17.4 overs)
Mitchell Van Buuren 51 (39); Christopher King 2/21 (3 overs)		JP King 56* (26); Beyers Swanepoel 1/33 (3 overs)

Warriors won by 8 wickets
St George's Park, Gqeberha
Umpires: Thomas Mokorosi and Andre Olivier

- Warriors won the toss and elected to field.
- Wilco de Bruin and Neil Timmers (Lions) both made their T20 debuts.
- Points: Warriors 4, Lions 0

Match 16
11 November 2025
17:00 (D/N)
Scorecard

North West; 173/5 (20 overs)	v	KwaZulu-Natal Inland; 148/8 (20 overs)
Ludwich Schuld 43 (33); Michael Erlank 3/17 (3 overs)		Ntando Zuma 42 (37); Onke Nyaku 3/29 (4 overs)

North West won by 25 runs
JB Marks Oval, Potchefstroom
Umpires: Mazizi Gampu and Brad White

- KwaZulu-Natal Inland won the toss and elected to field.
- Points: North West 4, KwaZulu-Natal Inland 0

Match 17
13 November 2025
13:00
Scorecard

KwaZulu-Natal Inland; 107 (19.4 overs)	v	Western Province; 109/1 (15.3 overs)
Cameron Shekleton 31* (39); Mbulelo Dube 2/9 (4 overs)		Edward Moore 41* (38); Sean Whitehead 1/22 (4 overs)

Western Province won by 9 wickets
City Oval, Pietermaritzburg
Umpires: Dennis Smith and Warren Wyngaard

- KwaZulu-Natal Inland won the toss and elected to bat.
- Points: Western Province 5, KwaZulu-Natal Inland 0

Match 18
14 November 2025
17:00 (D/N)
Scorecard

Boland; 134/8 (20 overs)	v	Dolphins; 134 (20 overs)
Grant Roelofsen 32 (18); Eathan Bosch 2/23 (3 overs)		Gomolemo Phiri 53 (37); Keith Dudgeon 3/27 (4 overs)

Match tied
(Boland won the second Super Over)
Boland Park, Paarl
Umpires: Marais Erasmus and Siphelele Gasa

- Boland won the toss and elected to bat.
- Semal Pillay (Dolphins) made his T20 debut.
- 1st Super Over: Dolphins 7/2, Boland 7/0
- 2nd Super Over: Boland 10/0, Dolphins 5/1
- Points: Boland 4, Dolphins 0

Match 19
14 November 2025
18:00 (D/N)
Scorecard

Titans; 196/6 (20 overs)	v	North West; 189/6 (20 overs)
Heinrich Klaasen 53 (31); Onke Nyaku 2/33 (4 overs)		Lesiba Ngoepe 64 (40); Lungi Ngidi 2/38 (4 overs)

Titans won by 7 runs
JB Marks Oval, Potchefstroom
Umpires: Mazizi Gampu and Stephen Harris

- North West won the toss and elected to field.
- Points: Titans 4, North West 0

Match 20
15 November 2025
13:00
Scorecard

Warriors; 181/7 (20 overs)	v	KwaZulu-Natal Inland; 127 (18 overs)
Muhammad Manack 54 (34); Bamanye Xenxe 4/41 (4 overs)		Chad Laycock 37 (38); Christopher King 2/16 (3 overs)

Warriors won by 54 runs
City Oval, Pietermaritzburg
Umpires: Lauren Agenbag and Dennis Smith

- KwaZulu-Natal Inland won the toss and elected to field.
- Points: Warriors 5, KwaZulu-Natal Inland 0

Match 21
16 November 2025
13:30
Scorecard

Dolphins; 138/7 (20 overs)	v	Western Province; 139/5 (18.1 overs)
Leus du Plooy 31 (25); Mbulelo Dube 4/26 (4 overs)		Joshua van Heerden 43 (36); JJ Smuts 2/11 (3 overs)

Western Province won by 5 wickets
Newlands Cricket Ground, Cape Town
Umpires: Thomas Mokorosi and Andre Olivier

- Western Province won the toss and elected to field.
- Points: Western Province 4, Dolphins 0

Match 22
16 November 2025
12:00
Scorecard

Titans	v	Lions

Match abandoned
Centurion Park, Centurion

- No toss.
- No play was possible due to rain.
- Points: Titans 2, Lions 2

Match 23
19 November 2025
18:00 (D/N)
Scorecard

Warriors; 209/5 (20 overs)	v	Boland; 111 (15.5 overs)
Muhammad Manack 52 (28); Ferisco Adams 2/31 (4 overs)		Lehan Botha 25 (14); Aphiwe Mnyanda 4/23 (4 overs)

Warriors won by 98 runs
St George's Park, Gqeberha
Umpires: Abongile Sodumo and Abdoellah Steenkamp

- Boland won the toss and elected to field.
- Points: Warriors 5, Boland 0

Match 24
19 November 2025
13:00
Scorecard

North West; 181/6 (20 overs)	v	Lions; 181/7 (20 overs)
Janneman Malan 56 (43); Evan Jones 2/25 (4 overs)		Rassie van der Dussen 66 (45); Jade de Klerk 3/12 (4 overs)

Match tied
(North West won the Super Over)
Wanderers Stadium, Johannesburg
Umpires: Arno Jacobs and Brad White

- Lions won the toss and elected to field.
- Super Over: Lions 7/2, North West 8/0
- Points: North West 4, Lions 0

Match 25
21 November 2025
12:00
Scorecard

Lions; 201/2 (20 overs)	v	Western Province; 183/6 (20 overs)
Reeza Hendricks 68* (45); Abdullah Bayoumy 1/13 (1 over)		Daniel Smith 103* (55); Evan Jones 2/34 (4 overs)

Lions won by 18 runs
Newlands Cricket Ground, Cape Town
Umpires: Lauren Agenbag and Lubabalo Gcuma

- Lions won the toss and elected to bat.
- Zakwan Patel (Lions) made his T20 debut.
- Daniel Smith (Western Province) scored his maiden century in T20s.
- Points: Lions 4, Western Province 0

Match 26
21 November 2025
13:30
Scorecard

Titans; 248/3 (20 overs)	v	Dolphins; 104/3 (7 overs)
Rivaldo Moonsamy 82 (49); Nqobani Mokoena 1/35 (3 overs)		Jason Smith 68* (19); Duan Jansen 2/16 (2 overs)

Dolphins won by 7 wickets (DLS method)
Centurion Park, Centurion
Umpires: Arno Jacobs and Stephen Harris

- Titans won the toss and elected to field.
- Dolphins were set a revised target of 104 runs from 7 overs due to rain.
- Points: Dolphins 4, Titans 0

Match 27
22 November 2025
13:00
Scorecard

Boland; 168/6 (20 overs)	v	KwaZulu-Natal Inland; 121 (20 overs)
Ferisco Adams 51* (35); Daryn Dupavillon 2/30 (4 overs)		Sean Gilson 44 (44); Glenton Stuurman 4/16 (4 overs)

Boland won by 47 runs
City Oval, Pietermaritzburg
Umpires: Bongani Jele and Abongile Sodumo

- Boland won the toss and elected to bat.
- Points: Boland 4, KwaZulu-Natal Inland 0

Match 28
23 November 2025
13:00
Scorecard

Lions; 194/2 (20 overs)	v	Dolphins; 195/8 (19.4 overs)
Rassie van der Dussen 94* (56); JJ Smuts 1/33 (4 overs)		Marques Ackerman 49 (28); Rafeeq Patel 2/32 (4 overs)

Dolphins won by 2 wickets
Kingsmead Cricket Ground, Durban
Umpires: Bongani Jele and Abdoellah Steenkamp

- Dolphins won the toss and elected to field.
- Points: Dolphins 4, Lions 0

== Playoffs ==
Qualifier 1 / Eliminator
25 November 2025
1	Boland	176/3 (20 overs)
2	Warriors	171/6 (20 overs)
26 November 2025
3	Dolphins	141/8 (20 overs)
4	Western Province	126/9 (20 overs)

Qualifier 2
28 November 2025
Q1L	Warriors	Advanced
EW	Dolphins	64/0 (5.3 overs)

Final
30 November 2025
Q1W	Boland	142/6 (20 overs)
Q2W	Warriors	142/5 (20 overs) (S/O)

=== Qualifier 1 ===
25 November 2025
18:00 (D/N)
Scorecard

Boland; 176/3 (20 overs)	v	Warriors; 171/6 (20 overs)
Gavin Kaplan 53* (46); Aphiwe Mnyanda 1/25 (4 overs)		Matthew De Villiers 96* (64); Imran Manack 3/25 (4 overs)

Boland won by 5 runs
Boland Park, Paarl
Umpires: Arno Jacobs and Bongani Jele

- Boland won the toss and elected to bat.

=== Eliminator ===
26 November 2025
13:00
Scorecard

Dolphins; 141/8 (20 overs)	v	Western Province; 126/9 (20 overs)
Jason Smith 58 (41); George Linde 2/9 (4 overs)		Joshua van Heerden 44 (41); Eathan Bosch 4/21 (4 overs)

Dolphins won by 15 runs
Kingsmead Cricket Ground, Durban
Umpires: Lubabalo Gcuma and Stephen Harris

- Western Province won the toss and elected to field.

=== Qualifier 2 ===
28 November 2025
18:00 (D/N)
Scorecard

Dolphins; 64/0 (5.3 overs)	v	Warriors
Bryce Parsons 35* (21)

No result
St George's Park, Gqeberha
Umpires: Arno Jacobs and Bongani Jele

- Warriors won the toss and elected to field.
- No further play was possible due to rain.
- Warriors advanced to final after finishing higher in Group stage.

=== Final ===
30 November 2025
13:00
Scorecard

Boland; 142/6 (20 overs)	v	Warriors; 142/5 (20 overs)
Lehan Botha 51 (45); Senuran Muthusamy 2/23 (4 over)		Jordan Hermann 74 (53); Siyabonga Mahima 3/24 (4 overs)

Match tied
(Warriors won the second Super Over)
Boland Park, Paarl
Umpires: Lubabalo Gcuma and Stephen Harris

- Boland won the toss and elected to bat.
- Super Over: Warriors 16/0, Boland 6/0

== See also ==
- 2025–26 CSA T20 Knock-Out Competition
- 2025–26 CSA 4-Day Series
- 2025–26 CSA One-Day Cup
