= JP Triegaardt =

South African cricketer and coach

Personal information
- Full name: Jean-Pierre Horatio Triegaardt
- Born: 10 March 1984 (age 42); Kimberley, Cape Province, South Africa
- Batting: Right-handed
- Role: Wicket-keeper

Domestic team information
- Years: Team
- 2005–2013: Griqualand West
- 2012–2013: Knights

Career statistics
Competition	FC	LA	T20
Matches	33	25	5
Runs scored	519	74	3
Batting average	15.26	5.28	3.00
100s/50s	0/0	0/0	0/0
Top score	49*	18	3
Catches/stumpings	109/7	23/5	3/1
- Source: CricketArchive, 1 September 2015

Jean-Pierre Horatio "JP" Triegaardt (born 10 March 1984) is a former South African cricketer who is the current head coach of Griqualand West at South African provincial level. His playing career as a wicket-keeper for Griqualand West and the Knights franchise spanned from 2005 to 2013.

Born in Kimberley, Triegaardt made his senior debut for Griqualand West in October 2005, aged 21, playing two matches during the 2005–06 season of the Provincial One-Day Challenge. However, after those matches, he did not appear again until March 2010, when he played a one-off match in the same competition. Triegaardt first began to play regularly for Griqualand West during the 2010–11 season, in both the one-day and the three-day formats. He made his first-class debut in September 2010, in an away fixture against Namibia, and went on to play in ten out of a possible twelve matches, finishing the season with the fourth-highest number of dismissals in the competition. In the one-day competition, he was ranked equal eighth for dismissals, playing eight out of a possible eleven matches.

In the one-day and three-day formats, Triegaardt remained Griqualand West's primary keeper for both the 2011–12 and 2012–13 seasons, although Adrian McLaren was preferred at Twenty20 level. Towards the end of the 2012–13 season, he received the opportunity to break through to franchise level, playing five matches for the Knights franchise in the Momentum 1 Day Cup. This arose due to an injury to Morne van Wyk, the normal wicket-keeper. At the time, Triegaardt was described by the franchise coach, Sarel Cilliers, as having been selected as "the best gloveman available", despite poor form with the bat. Outside of playing the sport, Triegaardt gained a level-three coaching qualification from Cricket South Africa, and became involved with Griqualand West's academy. In July 2013, he was appointed to replace Wendell Bossenger as Griqualand West's head coach, and consequently retired from playing. Despite playing over 60 matches across the three formats, Triegaardt finished his playing career without ever recording a half-century, a rarity for a modern wicket-keeper. His highest score was 49 not out, which came against Eastern Province in March 2012, and was made from ninth in the batting order.
