= Kerrin Klaaste =

South African cricket umpire

Personal information
- Full name: Kerrin Klaaste
- Born: 3 March 1998 (age 28); Kimberley, Northern Cape, South Africa
- Batting: Right-handed
- Bowling: Right-arm medium fast
- Role: Umpire

Domestic team information
- Years: Team
- 2012–2020: Northern Cape

Umpiring information
- T20Is umpired: 4 (2024)
- WTests umpired: 1 (2024)
- WODIs umpired: 12 (2023–2026)
- WT20Is umpired: 34 (2023–2026)
- FC umpired: 3 (2023–2024)
- LA umpired: 7 (2023–2025)
- T20 umpired: 11 (2024–2025)

Career statistics
| Competition | WLA | WT20 |
|---|---|---|
| Matches | 15 | 15 |
| Runs scored | 115 | 84 |
| Batting average | 8.84 | 5.60 |
| 100s/50s | 0/0 | 0/0 |
| Top score | 36 | 23 |
| Balls bowled | 252 | 215 |
| Wickets | 3 | 8 |
| Bowling average | 80.66 | 25.62 |
| 5 wickets in innings | 0 | 0 |
| 10 wickets in match | 0 | 0 |
| Best bowling | 1/18 | 3/12 |
| Catches/stumpings | 4/– | 2/– |
- Source: CricketArchive, 9 May 2024

Kerrin Klaaste (born 3 March 1998) is a South African cricket umpire. She is currently a member of Development Panel of ICC Umpires. She was one of the female umpires named by the ICC to stand in matches in the 2023 Under-19 Women's T20 World Cup tournament.

== Personal life ==
She was born at Kimberley, Northern Cape of South Africa and latter she moved to Knysna.

== Career ==
She played for Griqualand West (currently known as Northern Cape) in domestic cricket. She became the first female umpire to win the South Western Districts Cricket Umpires’ Association (SWDCUA) Umpire of the Season award.

In October 2022, she was first time added to the ICC's Development panel. In June 2023, Klaaste was promoted to CSA Reserve Umpire Panel by Cricket South Africa (CSA).

She was stood as an umpire in first Women's Twenty20 International (WT20I) in the 2023 ICC Women's T20 World Cup Africa Region Division Two Qualifier, between Malawi and Lesotho on 2 September 2023. She was featured as umpire in first Women's One Day International (WODI) in between South Africa and New Zealand when New Zealand tour to South Africa on 28 September 2023. She was featured in List A matches in the 2023 CSA One-Day Cup and she stood in her first List A match on 16 September 2023, between South Western Districts and Knights. She stood in her maiden first-class cricket match on 9 November 2023, between Knights and Northern Cape in the 2023–24 CSA 4-Day Series. She stood in her first Twenty20 match on 12 March 2024, between South Western Districts and Easterns in the 2024 CSA Provincial T20 Cup. She also stood as an on-field umpire in 2024 ICC Women's T20 World Cup Qualifier Final, which was held between Scotland and Sri Lanka, on 7 May 2024.

In September 2024, she first time stood as an on-field umpire in men's T20I between Malawi and Lesotho in 2024 ICC Men's T20 World Cup Africa Sub-regional Qualifier A.

== See also ==
- List of Twenty20 International cricket umpires
