= Gordon Parsons (cricketer) =

English cricketer

Personal information
- Full name: Gordon James Parsons
- Born: 17 October 1959 (age 67); Slough, Buckinghamshire, England
- Batting: Left-handed
- Bowling: Right-arm medium
- Role: All-rounder
- Relatives: Hansie Cronje (brother-in-law)

Domestic team information
- Years: Team
- 1978–1997: Leicestershire
- 1986–1988: Warwickshire
- 1983/84–1984/85: Boland
- 1985/86–1986/87: Griqualand West
- Source: Cricinfo, 15 May 2016

Gordon James Parsons (born 17 October 1959) is an English-born first-class cricketer who played in England and South Africa.

He was burly medium fast bowler and was a handy batsman who played most of his cricket for Leicestershire County Cricket Club, although he also appeared for Boland cricket team, Buckinghamshire, Griqualand West cricket team, Orange Free State cricket team, Orange Free State Country Districts and Warwickshire County Cricket Club during his first-class career which spanned from 1978 to 1997.

He was nicknamed Bullhead on the county circuit, he made up with aggression what he lacked in natural pace and took 809 first-class wickets with his right arm seamers, picking up another 356 in one day games. He took five wickets in an innings 19 times, with a best of 9 for 72. He was also a useful lower order batsman, scoring 6763 first-class runs with 29 fifties and a top score of 76.

In 1982 Parsons won an award as the leading bowler in the John Player League. Towards the end of his career he took 40 wickets as Leicestershire won the 1996 County Championship.

The brother-in-law of Hansie Cronje, he went on to coach the Highveld Lions in South Africa.
