= Bongani Ntshebe =

South African cricket umpire (born 1971)

Personal information
- Born: 24 September 1971 (age 55); King William's Town, South Africa

Umpiring information
- Source: Cricinfo, 28 February 2017

Bongani Ntshebe (born 24 September 1971) is a South African cricket umpire. He has stood in matches in the 2016–17 Sunfoil 3-Day Cup and the 2016–17 CSA Provincial One-Day Challenge tournaments.
