= Mthokozisi Shezi =

South African cricketer and umpire (born 1987)

Personal information
- Born: 9 September 1987 (age 39); Embali, Pietermaritzburg, Natal, South Africa
- Batting: Left-handed
- Bowling: Left-arm medium
- Role: Bowler

International information
- National side: South Africa (2014)
- Only ODI (cap 113): 21 August 2014 v Zimbabwe
- Source: Cricinfo, 21 February 2024

Mthokozisi Shezi (born 9 September 1987) is a South African cricket umpire and former cricketer who played in the 2006 Under-19 Cricket World Cup in Sri Lanka. His first-class and List A cricket has been for KwaZulu-Natal and Dolphins.

He made his One Day International debut against Zimbabwe in August 2014. He was included in the South Western Districts cricket team for the 2015 Africa T20 Cup. In August 2017, he was named in Durban Qalandars' squad for the first season of the T20 Global League. However, in October 2017, Cricket South Africa initially postponed the tournament until November 2018, mainly due to delay in securing a television broadcast deal and sponsorship rights, with the tournament being cancelled soon after.
