= Geoffrey Toyana =

South African cricketer (born 1974)

Personal information
- Born: 27 February 1974 (age 52); Soweto, South Africa
- Source: Cricinfo, 18 February 2016

Geoffrey Toyana (born 27 February 1974) is a South African former first-class cricketer. He is the coach of the Highveld Lions.
