= Gurshwin Rabie =

South African cricketer (born 1983)

Gurshwin Rabie (born 26 June 1983) is a South African cricketer. He is a right-handed batsman and a right-arm medium-fast bowler. He was born in Oudtshoorn.

Having made an appearance for South Africa Students during a Sri Lankan tour of the country in September 2008, Rabie made his first-class debut the following month for Western Province.

Batting as a tailender, Rabie finished not out in his debut first-class innings.
