= Gladman Gaseba =

South African cricket umpire (born 1977)

Personal information
- Born: 8 May 1977 (age 49); Port Elizabeth, South Africa

Umpiring information
- Source: Cricinfo, 2 March 2017

Gladman Gaseba (born 8 May 1977) is a South African cricket umpire. He has stood in matches in the 2016–17 Sunfoil 3-Day Cup and the 2016–17 CSA Provincial One-Day Challenge tournaments.
