= Buffalo Park =

Cricket ground

Coordinates: 33°00′24.14″S 27°55′09.72″E

- Interactive map of Buffalo Park

Ground information
- Location: East London, Eastern Cape
- Country: South Africa
- Home club: Border, Warriors
- Capacity: 16,000
- End names
- Buffalo Park Drive End; Bunkers Hill End

International information
- Only Test: 18–21 October 2002: South Africa v Bangladesh
- First ODI: 19 December 1992: South Africa v India
- Last ODI: 18 March 2023: South Africa v West Indies
- First T20I: 23 December 2012: South Africa v New Zealand
- Last T20I: 12 February 2020: South Africa v England
- First WODI: 18 February 2004: South Africa v England
- Last WODI: 9 April 2024: South Africa v Sri Lanka
- First WT20I: 16 February 2018: South Africa v India
- Last WT20I: 3 April 2024: South Africa v Sri Lanka
- As of 9 April 2024; Source: Cricinfo

Buffalo Park is a cricket ground in East London, Eastern Cape, South Africa. It is one of the home grounds for the Warriors cricket team, and the principal home ground for Border. It can hold up to 20,000 spectators.

Buffalo Park superseded the Jan Smuts Ground in East London as Border's main home ground in the 1987–88 season. It has hosted one Test match, in October 2002, and hosted a number of One Day Internationals.

It was also known as Mercedes-Benz Park, thanks to sponsorship from the German motor manufacturer.

== International five-wicket hauls ==
As of 7 March 2020

Six five-wicket hauls have been taken on the ground.

=== Test matches ===
Five-wicket hauls in Men's Test matches at Buffalo Park
No.	Bowler	Date	Team	Opposing Team	Inn	O	R	W	Result
1	Makhaya Ntini	18 October 2002	South Africa	Bangladesh	2	15	19	5	South Africa won
2	David Terbrugge	18 October 2002	South Africa	Bangladesh	3	15	46	5	South Africa won

=== One Day Internationals ===
Five-wicket hauls in Men's One Day Internationals at Buffalo Park
No.	Bowler	Date	Team	Opposing Team	Inn	O	R	W	Result
1	Wasim Akram	15 February 1993	Pakistan	South Africa	2	6.1	16	5	Pakistan won
2	Shaun Pollock	24 January 1999	South Africa	West Indies	1	10	35	6	West Indies won

Five-wicket hauls in Women's One Day Internationals at Buffalo Park
No.	Bowler	Date	Team	Opposing Team	Inn	O	R	W	Result
1	Deandra Dottin	24 February 2016	West Indies	South Africa	2	8.5	34	5	West Indies won

=== Twenty20 Internationals ===
Five-wicket hauls in Men's Twenty20 Internationals at Buffalo Park
No.	Bowler	Date	Team	Opposing Team	Inn	O	R	W	Result
1	Imran Tahir	9 October 2018	South Africa	Zimbabwe	2	4	23	5	South Africa won

== See also ==
- List of Test cricket grounds
