= Recreation Ground, Oudtshoorn =

Cricket ground

Recreation Ground
- Interactive map of Recreation Ground

Ground information
- Location: Oudtshoorn, Western Cape, South Africa
- Country: South Africa
- Coordinates: 33°35′36″S 22°12′0″E
- Establishment: 1889
- Capacity: n/a
- End names
- Vrede Street End; Voortrekker Street End

Team information
South Western Districts	(1888-present)
- As of May 4 2016; Source: CricketArchive

Recreation Ground is a cricket ground in Oudtshoorn, Western Cape, South Africa. It is situated in the centre of the town, on Voortrekker Street. It is the headquarters of the South Western Districts Cricket Board.

The first recorded match on the ground was in 1889, when South Western Districts hosted the touring R. G. Warton's XI from England. It has served as South Western Districts' main home ground since then, and has hosted first-class matches regularly from the 2006–07 season. At the conclusion of the 2025–26 season it had staged 92 first-class matches, as well as 76 List A matches. The ground also hosted matches in the 2016 Africa T20 Cup, including the semi-finals and final.
