= Easterns cricket team =

Cricket team

Easterns
- One Day name: Easterns Storm

Team information
- Colours: Red
- Founded: 1991
- Home ground: Willowmoore Park, Benoni
- Official website: Official website

The Easterns cricket team is a South African first-class cricket team. It plays in the top-level domestic competitions organised by Cricket South Africa. The team was formerly named the Eastern Transvaal cricket team.

== History ==
Easterns Cricket Union is based at Benoni in Gauteng province. It was founded as the Eastern Transvaal Cricket Union in June 1991 at Springs, although Eastern Transvaal had played List A cricket from the 1989–90 season. Prior to 1991 the region was part of the area which fed in to the Northern Transvaal cricket team. (Note: The province of Gauteng was formed from part of Transvaal Province in 1994. Northern Transvaal became the Northerns cricket team.)

Easterns won the Currie Cup Bowl competition in 1991–92, their first season as a first-class team. The team was renamed Easterns ahead of the 1995–96 season, and after the full Currie Cup competition was opened up to all first-class teams in 1999–00, the side won the Cup in 2002–03.

During 2003, Cricket South Africa changed the way in which top-class domestic cricket in the country was organised. This created six franchise teams at the top level of domestic competition, combining the existing provincial sides, including Easterns, to create an elite competition. Easterns and Northerns combined to create the Titans franchise, with Northerns as the senior partner. The CSA 4-Day Domestic Series and CSA One-Day Cup became franchise-only competitions from the 2004–05 season, and Easterns competed in the CSA 3-Day and One-Day Cups and, from 2011–12, the CSA T20 competition, with the side winning the One-Day Provincial Cup in 2018–19 and the CSA Provincial T20 Cup the following season.

The period of franchise competition lasted until the end of the 2020–21 season when Cricket South Africa reverted to a division based provincial competition, with Easterns competing separately from the start of the 2021–22 season.

Ahead of the 2006–07 season, the Mpumalanga cricket team was elevated to first-class status. Mpumalanga province had been formed in 1994 out of areas of the East Rand territories that were traditionally associated with Easterns.

== Current squad ==
Squad for 2026/27 Season. Players in bold have played international cricket.

Name	Nationality	Birth date	Batting style	Bowling style	Notes
Batters
Christopher Britz	South Africa	1 August 1998 (age 28)	Right-handed		
Brayden Hicks	South Africa	9 November 2002 (age 23)	Right-handed	Right-arm orthodox spin	High-performance Contract
Dewan Marais	South Africa	15 October 2004 (age 21)	Right-handed		
Kabelo Sekhukhune	South Africa	16 July 1997 (age 29)	Left-handed		
Keeper
Ronan Herrmann	South Africa	5 December 2003 (age 22)	Right-handed		
All-Rounders
Juan Lubbe	South Africa	10 September 2001 (age 24)	Right-handed	Right-arm orthodox spin	High-performance Contract
Sabelo Mabanga	South Africa		Left-handed	Right-arm orthodox spin	High-performance Contract
Jurie Snyman	South Africa	20 February 1995 (age 31)	Left-handed	Right-arm orthodox	
Bowlers
Merrick Brett	South Africa	14 February 2001 (age 25)	Right-handed	Right-arm seam	
Chad Classen	South Africa	7 January 1997 (age 29)	Right-handed	Right-arm seam	
Aryan Gopalan	South Africa	21 September 2004 (age 21)	Right-handed	Left-arm orthodox spin	
Amaan Khan	South Africa	26 November 2003 (age 22)	Right-handed	Right-arm seam	
Martin Khumalo	South Africa	15 October 2005 (age 20)	Right-handed	Right-arm seam	
Thabiso Lekhoana	South Africa	4 May 2000 (age 26)	Right-handed	Right-arm seam	High-performance Contract
Tumelo Simelane	South Africa	10 July 1995 (age 31)	Left-handed	Left-arm orthodox spin	

== Honours ==
- Currie Cup (1) – 2002–03
- Currie Cup Bowl (1) – 1991–92
- One-Day Provincial Cup (1) – 2018–19
- CSA Provincial T20 Cup (1) – 2019–20

== Venues ==
Venues have included:

- PAM Brink Stadium, Springs (1992–1996)
- Olympia Park, Springs (used once in November 1994; formerly an occasional Northerns venue between 1937 and 1994)
- Willowmoore Park, Benoni (main venue from November 1996)
