= De Beers Diamond Oval =

Cricket stadium in Kimberley, Northern Cape, South Africa

Coordinates: 28°44′32.75″S 24°47′51.80″E

Diamond Oval
- De Beers Country Club
- Interactive map of Diamond Oval

Ground information
- Location: Kimberley
- Country: South Africa
- End names
- North End; South End

International information
- First men's ODI: 7 April 1998: Pakistan v Sri Lanka
- Last men's ODI: 1 February 2023: South Africa v England
- Only men's T20I: 10 October 2010: South Africa v Zimbabwe
- First women's ODI: 8 October 2016: South Africa v New Zealand
- Last women's ODI: 13 April 2024: South Africa v Sri Lanka
- First women's T20I: 17 May 2018: South Africa v Bangladesh
- Last women's T20I: 8 December 2023: South Africa v Bangladesh

Team information
Griqualand West	(1973–2015)
VKB Knights	(2004–)
Northern Cape	(2015–)
- As of 13 April 2024; Source: ESPN Cricinfo

The De Beers Diamond Oval is a cricket stadium in Kimberley, Northern Cape, South Africa. It opened in 1973 and has a capacity of 11,000. It is currently used mostly for cricket matches and is the home venue of both the VKB Knights, in the Sunfoil Series, and Northern Cape (formerly Griqualand West), in the CSA Provincial Competitions. Griqualand West left the old De Beers Stadium ahead of the 1973–74 season and have been resident at the Diamond Oval since then.

The ground is in the Cassandra suburb of Kimberley at the junction of Lardner Burke Avenue with Dickenson Avenue. It is adjacent to the Kimberley Country Club and close to the De Beers company's technical training campus.

== International Centuries ==
As of February 2023 ten ODI centuries have been scored at the venue.

No.	Score	Player	Team	Balls	Inns	Opposing team	Date	Result
1	116*	Inzamam-ul-Haq	Pakistan	110	2	Sri Lanka	7 April 1998	Won
2	101	Gary Kirsten	South Africa	107	2	New Zealand	28 October 2000	Won
3	108*	Herschelle Gibbs	South Africa	92	2	Sri Lanka	4 December 2002	Won
4	119	Chris Gayle	West Indies	151	1	Kenya	4 March 2003	Won
5	145*	Kane Williamson	New Zealand	136	1	South Africa	22 January 2013	Won
6	110*	Mushfiqur Rahim	Bangladesh	116	1	South Africa	15 October 2017	Lost
7	168*	Quinton de Kock	South Africa	145	2	Bangladesh	15 October 2017	Won
8	110*	Hashim Amla	South Africa	112	2	Bangladesh	15 October 2017	Won
9	118	Dawid Malan	England	114	1	South Africa	1 February 2023	Won
10	131	Jos Buttler	England	127	1	South Africa	1 February 2023	Won

== International five-wicket hauls ==
Six five-wicket hauls have been taken on the ground, four in men's ODIs and two in women's ODIs.

Five-wicket hauls in Men's One Day Internationals at Diamond Oval
No.	Bowler	Date	Team	Opposing Team	Inn	O	R	W	Result
1	Mark Ealham	30 January 2000	England	Zimbabwe	1	10	15	5	England won
2	Wasim Akram	16 February 2003	Pakistan	Namibia	2	9	28	5	Pakistan won
3	Vasbert Drakes	4 March 2003	West Indies	Kenya	2	10	33	5	West Indies won
4	Jofra Archer	1 February 2023	England	South Africa	2	9.1	40	6	England won

Five-wicket hauls in Women's One Day Internationals at Diamond Oval
No.	Bowler	Date	Team	Opposing Team	Inn	O	R	W	Result
1	Morna Nielsen	11 October 2016	New Zealand	South Africa	2	10	39	5	South Africa won
2	Holly Huddleston	13 October 2016	New Zealand	South Africa	1	10	25	5	New Zealand won
