= Northern Cape cricket team =

Cricket team

Northern Cape
- One Day name: Northern Cape Heat

Team information
- Founded: 1884
- Home ground: De Beers Diamond Oval, Kimberley

Northern Cape (formerly Griqualand West) is a first-class cricket team that nominally represents the South African province of Northern Cape in the CSA Provincial Competitions. The team is selected and supported by Northern Cape Cricket and plays its home games at the De Beers Diamond Oval in Kimberley.

At organisational level, Northern Cape Cricket is responsible for the administration and development of cricket in the province and among its primary functions are management and promotion of the Northern Cape team. Originally founded sometime before 1884 as the Kimberley Cricket Club, the organization developed at provincial level as the Griqualand West Cricket Board until 2015 when it was renamed Northern Cape Cricket to comply with a government directive that provincial sporting bodies should have their governance structure aligned with the geo-political structure of the country.

The team was called Kimberley to 1890–91 and Griqualand West to 2014–15. It has been called Northern Cape from the beginning of the 2015–16 season. For the purposes of the SuperSport (now Sunfoil) Series, Griqualand West merged with Free State to form the VKB Knights (originally the Diamond Eagles) from October 2004, but Griqualand West (renamed Northern Cape in 2015) has retained its independent status as a team in the CSA Provincial Competitions.

== History ==
Beginning as Kimberley Cricket Club, the team is first recorded in the 1884–85 season playing in the Champion Bat Tournament. In 1888–89, they won two odds matches against the English touring team known then as R. G. Warton's XI. As a result of those victories, Kimberley were awarded the new Currie Cup as the most accomplished domestic team in South Africa. In the 1889–90 season, they were successfully challenged for the trophy by Transvaal but they recovered it in 1890–91. The first matches as Griqualand West were played in December 1890 for the Champion Bat Tournament and, from 1891–92, the team was known by its provincial name only.

In 1897, the Barnato Memorial Trophy was given to the Griqualand West Coloured Cricket Board, a union for all black cricket players that had been set up in 1892. Griqualand West participated in the first Barnato Tournament in 1898–99, along with Eastern Province, Queenstown, Southern Border, and Western Province. In 1904, Griqualand West was one of the three founding members of the South African Coloured Cricket Board (SACCB). In total, there were thirteen editions of the SACCB-run Barnato Cup tournaments, which were played between 1904 and 1951–52. Griqualand West won the competition in 1910 and hosted it in 1904 and 1913.

In 2004–05, the format of the Sunfoil (then SuperSport) Series was changed, with the reduction of eleven provincial teams into six franchises. After missing the first season of the franchise tournament due to a legal dispute, Griqualand West partnered Free State to create the then Diamond Eagles who were renamed VKB Knights ahead of the 2010–11 season. Just before the beginning of the 2015–16 season it was announced that the organisation was to be renamed Northern Cape Cricket, in line with the national government directive that provincial sporting bodies should have their governance structure aligned with the geo-political structure of the country.

== Current squad ==
Squad for 2026/27 Season. Players in bold have played international cricket.

Name	Nationality	Birth date	Batting style	Bowling style	Notes
Batters
Moegamat Alexander	South Africa	27 September 2004 (age 21)	Left-handed	Right-arm orthodox spin	High-performance Contract
Liam Doherty	South AfricaIreland	26 January 2004 (age 22)	Right-handed	Right-arm seam	High-performance Contract
Tristan janse van Rensburg	South Africa	31 January 2001 (age 25)	Left-handed	Right-arm orthodox spin	High-performance Contract
Gerhardus Maree	South Africa	21 December 2004 (age 21)	Left-handed		
Abel Mokwena	South Africa	6 February 2004 (age 22)	Right-handed	Right-arm orthodox spin	High-Performance Contract
Steve Stolk	South Africa	10 February 2006 (age 20)	Right-handed		
Nonelela Yikha	South Africa	13 August 2001 (age 24)	Right-handed		
Keepers
Ulrich Haasbroek	South Africa	11 June 2004 (age 22)	Right-handed		High-performance Contract
Tahir Isaacs	South Africa	3 January 2002 (age 24)	Left-handed	Right-arm seam	
All-rounders
Kyle Jacobs	South Africa	20 April 1998 (age 28)	Right-handed	Right-arm wrist spin	
Orapeleng Motlhoaring	South Africa	23 August 2001 (age 24)	Right-handed	Right-arm seam	High-performance Contract
Charl Prinsloo	South Africa		Right-handed	Right-arm seam	
Blake Simpson	South Africa		Right-handed	Right-arm wrist spin	
Romano Terblanche	South Africa	10 June 1986 (age 40)	Left-handed	Left-arm seam	Vice Captain
Ruan van Rooyen	South Africa	21 February 2001 (age 25)	Left-handed	Left-arm orthodox spin	High-performance Contract
Bowlers
Rowan Bezuidenhout	South Africa	9 February 2003 (age 23)	Right-handed	Right-arm seam	High-performance Contract
Hernus Marais	South Africa	15 January 2004 (age 22)	Right-handed	Right-arm seam	High-performance Contract
Odirile Modimokoane	South Africa	10 July 2001 (age 25)	Right-handed	Left-arm orthodox spin	
Tshepo Ntuli	South Africa	15 November 1995 (age 30)	Right-handed	Right-arm orthodox spin	Captain
Johan van Dyk	South Africa	23 January 1994 (age 32)	Right-handed	Right-arm seam	

== Venues ==
Venues have included:

- Eclectics Cricket Club Ground, Kimberley (1889–1914)
- Athletic Club Ground, Kimberley (1920–1927)
- De Beers Stadium, Kimberley (1927–1973)
- Christian Brothers College, Kimberley (Dec 1951–Jan 1952)
- De Beers Diamond Oval, Kimberley (1973–present)

== Honours ==
- Currie Cup (1) – 1890–91
- Standard Bank Cup (1) – 1998–99
- South African Airways Provincial Three-Day Challenge (4) – 2004–05, 2007–08, 2008–09, 2011-12
