= List of Nottinghamshire Cricket Board List A players =

A cricket team representing the Nottinghamshire Cricket Board played five List A cricket matches between 1999 and 2002. This is a list of the players who appeared in those matches.

- Aquib Afzaal, 1 match, 2001
- Vikram Atri, 1 match, 2001
- Richard Bates, 1 match, 2002
- Travis Binnion, 1 match, 2002
- Stephen Brogan, 2 matches, 1999–2000
- James Cameron, 1 match, 2000
- Murray Creed, 3 matches, 2001–2002
- Mark Footitt, 1 match, 2001
- Jamie Hart, 2 matches, 2001
- Jamil Hassan, 1 match, 1999
- James Hindson, 4 matches, 2000–2002
- Richard Hodgkinson, 1 match, 2001
- Zahid Iqbal, 2 matches, 1999–2002
- Andrew Jackman, 4 matches, 1999–2002
- Rahim Karim, 1 match, 2000
- William Kirby, 1 match, 2000
- Nadeem Malik, 1 match, 2000
- Simon Neal, 1 match, 1999
- Bhavesh Patel, 1 match, 2001
- Richard Pilgrim, 1 match, 2001
- Stephen Randall, 1 match, 1999
- Paul Riley, 1 match, 2002
- Tom Savill, 2 matches, 2001
- Mark Saxelby, 1 match, 2000
- Peter Scott, 1 match, 2001
- Bilal Shafayat, 2 matches, 2000–2001
- Rashid Shafayat, 1 match, 1999
- Suneal Sharma, 1 match, 2002
- Jonathan Shaw, 1 match, 1999
- Simon Shipp, 1 match, 2000
- Wayne Spooner, 1 match, 1999
- Aaron Thomas, 2 matches, 2001
- Karl Thomas, 1 match, 1999
- Chris Tolley, 2 matches, 2001
- Mark Tournier, 1 match, 2002
- John Wakeling, 1 match, 1999
- Peter Wilshaw, 1 match, 2002
- Richard Wyld, 3 matches, 2000–2002
