= Akhil Patel =

English cricketer

Personal information
- Full name: Akhil Patel
- Born: 18 June 1990 (age 36); Nottingham, Nottinghamshire, England
- Batting: Left-handed
- Bowling: Left-arm unorthodox spin
- Relatives: Samit Patel (brother)
- Source: CricketArchive

Akhil Patel (born 19 June 1990) is an English cricketer who was born in Nottingham and played for Nottinghamshire. He is a left-handed batsman and a left-arm unorthodox spin bowler. Patel made his debut first-class appearance for Derbyshire in April 2007 at the age of just 16, making a sturdy innings of 31 against Cambridge University UCCE, assisting the county's new Danish star Frederik Klokker on the latter's way to a century in just his second first-class appearance.

Patel also appeared in 2007 for Derbyshire's Second XI team, once again in partnership with Klokker. Patel is an often-reliable force with the bat, his only weakness so far being shown in a Second XI game against Nottinghamshire where, surrounded by some weaker team-mates, seven of whom failed to make double-figures, Patel was caught while in the middle of an initially healthy-looking partnership with team-mate Nicholas Ferraby.

In 2009 he joined his brother, Samit, six years his senior, at Nottinghamshire. He made a handful of games for the Outlaws before being released at the end of 2011 season. He also played Nottinghamshire Cricket Board Premier League for his home club Kimberley Institute Cricket Club.
