= Peter Scott (disambiguation) =

Peter Scott (1909–1989) was a British ornithologist, conservationist, painter and sportsman.

Peter or Pete Scott may also refer to:

== Religion ==
- Peter Cameron Scott (1867–1896), Scottish-American missionary to Africa
- Peter Scott (social entrepreneur) (1890–1972), English Quaker activist
- Peter Manley Scott (born 1961), British theologian

== Sports ==
- Pete Scott (1897–1953), American baseball player
- Peter Scott (cricketer, born 1912) (1912–1944), English cricketer
- Peter Scott (Australian footballer) (1931–2023), Australian rules footballer
- Peter Scott (rugby union) (born 1940), Australian rugby union player
- Peter Scott (footballer, born 1952) (1952–2024), English-born Northern Irish footballer
- Peter Scott (footballer, born 1963), English footballer
- Peter Scott (canoeist) (born 1973), Australian sprint canoeist
- Peter Scott (cricketer, born 1982), English cricketer
- Peter Scott (skier) (born 1990), South African alpine skier
- Peter Scott (field hockey) (born 1997), English field hockey player

== Others ==
- Peter Scott (diplomat) (1917–2002), British diplomat
- Peter Graham Scott (1923–2007), English film producer, director, editor and screenwriter
- Peter Dale Scott (born 1929), Canadian poet and anti-war activist
- Peter Scott (thief) (1931–2013), British burglar and thief
- G. Peter Scott (1944–2023), British mathematician
- Peter Scott (educationalist) (born 1946), British academic
- Peter J. H. Scott (born 1979), British and American chemist

== See also ==
- Peter Scot, an Indian whisky brand
