= KICC =

KICC can mean:

- Kavli Institute for Cosmology, Cambridge, a research establishment in Cambridge, England, United Kingdom
- Kentucky International Convention Center, a convention facility in Louisville, Kentucky, United States
- Kenyatta International Convention Centre, a building in Nairobi, Kenya
- Kimberley Institute Cricket Club, a cricket club in Kimberly, England, United Kingdom
- Kingsway International Christian Centre, a church in Kent, England, United Kingdom
- Kyoto International Conference Center, a conference facility in Sakyō-ku, Kyoto, Japan
