= Mansfield Hosiery Mills Cricket Club =

Personnel
- Captain: Craig Gould
- Overseas player(s): Dylan Barmby

Team information
- Founded: 1947
- Home ground: The Fieldings, Huthwaite

History
- Notts Premier wins: 0

Mansfield Hosiery Mills Cricket Club is an English cricket club based in Sutton-in-Ashfield in Nottinghamshire. The club competes in the Nottinghamshire Cricket Board Premier League, which is an accredited ECB Premier League, gaining promotion to the league in 2004.

Like most Premier League clubs, Mansfield have employed overseas and English professional cricketers. During 2006 this was Francois du Plessis, the South Africa T20I captain and Test and ODI player, and in 2017 Australian cricketer Dylan Barmby. Former Leicestershire player Tom New has also played for the club.
