= CSA Awards =

Cricket awards presented by Cricket South Africa

The CSA Awards are a set of annual cricket awards presented by Cricket South Africa (CSA). The awards recognise and honour the top South African international and domestic cricketers of the previous season.

== List of winners ==
=== 2010 ===
The winners were awarded on 20 July 2010.

International

- Cricketer of the year: Hashim Amla
- Test cricketer of the year: Hashim Amla
- ODI cricketer of the year: AB de Villiers
- T20I cricketer of the year: Charl Langeveldt
- Players' player of the year: Hashim Amla
- Fans' player of the year: Hashim Amla
- International newcomer of the year: Ryan McLaren

Domestic

- First-class cricketer of the season: Rilee Rossouw
- One-day Cup cricketer of the season: Herschelle Gibbs
- Twenty20 cricketer of the season: Colin Ingram
- Domestic players' player of the season: Colin Ingram
- SACA MVP: Colin Ingram

=== 2011 ===
The winners were awarded on 7 June 2011.

International

- Cricketer of the year: Jacques Kallis
- Test cricketer of the year: Jacques Kallis
- ODI cricketer of the year: AB de Villiers
- T20I cricketer of the year: Lonwabo Tsotsobe
- Players' player of the year: Hashim Amla
- Fans' player of the year: Hashim Amla
- International newcomer of the year: Imran Tahir

Domestic

- First-class cricketer of the season: Imran Tahir
- One-day Cup cricketer of the season: Faf du Plessis
- Twenty20 cricketer of the season: Owais Shah
- Domestic players' player of the season: Imran Tahir
- Domestic newcomer of the season: Yaseen Vallie
- Coach of the year: Richard Pybus
- CSA Fair Play award: Warriors
- SACA MVP: Morne van Wyk
- Umpire of the year: Johan Cloete
- Umpires' umpire of the year: Johan Cloete
- Groundsman of the year: Louis Kruger
- Scorers' Association of the year: Gauteng Cricket Board

=== 2012 ===
The winners were awarded on 6 June 2012.

International

- Cricketer of the year: Vernon Philander
- Test cricketer of the year: Vernon Philander
- ODI cricketer of the year: AB de Villiers
- T20I cricketer of the year: Richard Levi
- Players' player of the year: AB de Villiers
- Fans' player of the year: Vernon Philander
- International newcomer of the year: Marchant de Lange
- Women's cricketer of the year: Shandre Fritz

Domestic

- First-class cricketer of the season: Alviro Petersen
- One-day Cup cricketer of the season: Dean Elgar
- Twenty20 cricketer of the season: Farhaan Behardien
- Domestic players' player of the season: Faf du Plessis
- Domestic newcomer of the season: Eddie Leie
- Coach of the year: Matthew Maynard
- CSA Fair Play award: Dolphins
- SACA MVP: Morne van Wyk
- Under-19 cricketer of the year: Quinton de Kock

=== 2013 ===
The winners were awarded on 9 September 2013.

International

- Cricketer of the year: Hashim Amla
- Test cricketer of the year: Hashim Amla
- ODI cricketer of the year: AB de Villiers
- T20I cricketer of the year: Dale Steyn
- Players' player of the year: AB de Villiers
- Fans' player of the year: Hashim Amla
- Delivery of the year: Jacques Kallis
- International newcomer of the year: Kyle Abbott
- Women's cricketer of the year: Marizanne Kapp

Domestic

- First-class cricketer of the season: Johann Louw
- One-day Cup cricketer of the season: Richard Levi
- Twenty20 cricketer of the season: Quinton de Kock
- Domestic players' player of the season: Kyle Abbott
- Domestic newcomer of the season: Ayabulela Gqamane
- Coach of the year: Geoffrey Toyana
- CSA Fair Play award: Lions
- SACA MVP: Roelof van der Merwe
- Umpire of the year: Johan Cloete
- Umpires' umpire of the year: Shaun George
- Groundsman of the year: Chris Scott
- Scorers' Association of the year: Gauteng Cricket Board

=== 2014 ===
The winners were awarded on 3 June 2014.

International

- Cricketer of the year: AB de Villiers
- Test cricketer of the year: AB de Villiers
- ODI cricketer of the year: Quinton de Kock
- T20I cricketer of the year: Imran Tahir
- Players' player of the year: AB de Villiers
- Fans' player of the year: AB de Villiers
- Delivery of the year: Dale Steyn
- Women's cricketer of the year: Marizanne Kapp

Domestic

- First-class cricketer of the season: Justin Ontong
- One-day Cup cricketer of the season: Heino Kuhn
- Twenty20 cricketer of the season: David Miller
- Domestic players' player of the season: Kyle Abbott
- Coach of the year: Lance Klusener
- CSA Fair Play award: Dolphins
- SACA MVP: Kyle Abbott
- Groundsman of the year: Wilson Ngobese

=== 2015 ===
The winners were awarded on 3 June 2015.

International

- Cricketer of the year: AB de Villiers
- Test cricketer of the year: Hashim Amla
- ODI cricketer of the year: AB de Villiers
- T20I cricketer of the year: Morne van Wyk
- Players' player of the year: AB de Villiers
- Fans' player of the year: AB de Villiers
- Delivery of the year: Dale Steyn
- International newcomer of the year: Rilee Rossouw
- Women's cricketer of the year: Shabnim Ismail

Domestic

- First-class cricketer of the season: Stephen Cook
- One-day Cup cricketer of the season: Robin Peterson
- Twenty20 cricketer of the season: Kieron Pollard
- Coach of the year: Geoffrey Toyana
- CSA Fair Play award: Titans
- SACA MVP: Dane Paterson
- Umpire of the year: Johan Cloete
- Groundsman of the year: Rudolph du Preez

=== 2016 ===
The winners were awarded on 27 July 2016.

International

- Cricketer of the year: Kagiso Rabada
- Test cricketer of the year: Kagiso Rabada
- ODI cricketer of the year: Kagiso Rabada
- T20I cricketer of the year: Imran Tahir
- Players' player of the year: Kagiso Rabada
- Fans' player of the year: Kagiso Rabada
- Delivery of the year: Kagiso Rabada
- International newcomer of the year: Stephen Cook
- Women's cricketer of the year: Dane van Niekerk

Domestic

- First-class cricketer of the season: Heino Kuhn
- One-day Cup cricketer of the season: Alviro Petersen
- Twenty20 cricketer of the season: Albie Morkel
- Domestic players' player of the season: Heino Kuhn
- Domestic newcomer of the season: Nicky van den Bergh
- Africa T20 Cup player of the year: Lungi Ngidi
- Coach of the year: Rob Walter
- CSA Fair Play award: Cape Cobras
- SACA MVP: Dwaine Pretorius

=== 2017 ===
The winners were awarded on 13 May 2017.

International

- Cricketer of the year: Quinton de Kock
- Test cricketer of the year: Quinton de Kock
- ODI cricketer of the year: Quinton de Kock
- T20I cricketer of the year: Imran Tahir
- Players' player of the year: Quinton de Kock
- Fans' player of the year: Quinton de Kock
- Award of excellence: Temba Bavuma
- Delivery of the year: Kagiso Rabada
- International newcomer of the year: Keshav Maharaj
- Women's cricketer of the year: Sune Luus
- Women's Players' player of the year: Lizelle Lee
- International women's newcomer of the year: Laura Wolvaardt

Domestic

- First-class cricketer of the season: Duanne Olivier
- One-day Cup cricketer of the season: Henry Davids
- Twenty20 cricketer of the season: Farhaan Behardien
- Domestic players' player of the season: Colin Ackermann
- Domestic newcomer of the season: Aiden Markram
- Africa T20 Cup player of the year: Patrick Kruger
- Coach of the year: Mark Boucher
- SACA MVP: Colin Ackermann
- Umpire of the year: Shaun George
- Umpire's umpire of the year: Shaun George

=== 2018 ===
The winners were awarded on 3 June 2018.

International

- Cricketer of the year: Kagiso Rabada
- Test cricketer of the year: Kagiso Rabada
- ODI cricketer of the year: Kagiso Rabada
- T20I cricketer of the year: AB de Villiers
- Players' player of the year: Kagiso Rabada
- Fans' player of the year: Kagiso Rabada
- Delivery of the year: Kagiso Rabada
- International newcomer of the year: Aiden Markram
- Women's cricketer of the year: Dane van Niekerk
- Women's ODI cricketer of the year: Laura Wolvaardt
- Women's T20I cricketer of the year: Chloe Tryon
- Women's Players' player of the year: Laura Wolvaardt

Domestic

- First-class cricketer of the season: Simon Harmer
- One-day Cup cricketer of the season: Tabraiz Shamsi
- Twenty20 cricketer of the season: Tabraiz Shamsi
- Domestic players' player of the season: Pieter Malan
- Domestic newcomer of the season: Kyle Verreynne
- Coach of the year: Mark Boucher
- SACA MVP: JJ Smuts

=== 2019 ===
The winners were awarded on 4 August 2019.

International

- Cricketer of the year: Faf du Plessis
- Test cricketer of the year: Quinton de Kock
- ODI cricketer of the year: Faf du Plessis
- T20I cricketer of the year: David Miller
- International newcomer of the year: Rassie van der Dussen
- Women's cricketer of the year: Dane van Niekerk
- Women's ODI cricketer of the year: Marizanne Kapp
- Women's T20I cricketer of the year: Shabnim Ismail
- International women's newcomer of the year: Tumi Sekhukhune

=== 2024 ===
The winners were awarded on 5 September 2024.

International

- Men's Player of the year: Marco Jansen
- Women's Player of the year: Laura Wolvaardt
- Men's Test Player of the year: David Bedingham
- Men's ODI Player of the year: Quinton de Kock
- Men's T20I Player of the year: Reeza Hendricks
- Women's ODI Player of the year: Laura Wolvaardt
- Women's T20I Player of the year: Laura Wolvaardt
- Men's Newcomer of the year: David Bedingham
- Women's Newcomer of the year: Eliz-Mari Marx
- Men's Players' Player of the year: Keshav Maharaj
- Women's Players' Player of the year: Laura Wolvaardt
- Fans' Player of the year: Laura Wolvaardt
- Best Delivery (fuelled by KFC): Marizanne Kapp
- Makhaya Ntini Power of Cricket Award: Masabata Klaas

Domestic

- Men's SACA Most Valuable Player: Bjorn Fortuin
- Women's SACA Most Valuable Player: Yolandi Potgieter
- Men's Domestic Players' Player of the season: Bjorn Fortuin
- Women's Domestic Players' Player of the season: Yolandi Potgieter
- Domestic Men's Newcomer of the season: Nqaba Peter
- Women's Domestic Newcomer of the year: Tabitha La Grange
- T20 Challenge Player of the season: Nqaba Peter
- T20 Knockout Player of the season: Don Radebe
- Division 1 One-Day Cup Player of the season: Mihlali Mpongwana
- Division 2 One-Day Cup Player of the season: Garnett Tarr
- Women's Division 1 One-Day Player of the season: Nonkululeko Mlaba
- Women's Division 1 T20 Player of the season: Tazmin Brits
- Division 1 4-day Domestic Series Player of the season: Wiaan Mulder
- Division 2 4-day Domestic Series Player of the season: Blayde Capell
- Division 1 Coach of the year: Russell Domingo
- Women's Division 1 Coach of the year: Claire Terblanche
- Division 2 Coach of the year: JP Triegaardt

Match Officials

- CSA Umpire of the year: Allahudien Paleker
- CSA Umpires' Umpire of the year: Allahudien Paleker
