= Guy Welton =

English cricketer (born 1978)

Guy Welton (born 4 May 1978) was an English cricketer. He was a right-handed batsman and a right-arm off-break bowler. He played First-class cricket for Nottinghamshire, and also played for Lincolnshire, and Derbyshire's Second XI.

Prior to playing for first-class cricket, he played for Worcestershire's Second XI, debuting with a duck in an innings defeat against Surrey. He played extensively with the Second XI teams of Nottinghamshire and Derbyshire, and played his debut First-class match in 1997. Despite appearing early in his Second XI career as a tailend batsman, he began his first-class career powerful by being a high-scoring hitter. He ended with a first-class average of over 25, and a top-score of 200.*

In local domestic cricket, he currently plays for Caythorpe Cricket Club in the Nottinghamshire Cricket Board Premier League. He also spent two years on the MCC Groundstaff as a Young Professional whilst also on the books of Grimsby Town FC as a promising Goalkeeper, playing for the Reserves at 14 years of age.
