= Paul Riley (cricketer) =

English cricketer

Personal information
- Full name: Paul Kevin Riley
- Born: 18 November 1981 (age 44); Rushcliffe, Nottinghamshire, England
- Batting: Right-handed

Domestic team information
- Years: Team
- 2002: Nottinghamshire Cricket Board

Career statistics
Competition	List A
Matches	1
Runs scored	2
Batting average	2.00
100s/50s	0/0
Top score	2
Catches/stumpings	0/–
- Source: Cricinfo, 21 November 2010

Paul Kevin Riley (born 18 November 1981) is an English cricketer. Riley is a right-handed batsman. He was born in Rushcliffe, Nottinghamshire.

Riley represented the Nottinghamshire Cricket Board in a single List A match against Cumberland in the 1st round of the 2003 Cheltenham & Gloucester Trophy which was played in 2002. In his only List A match he scored a 2 runs.

He currently plays club cricket for Caythorpe Cricket Club in Nottinghamshire Cricket Board Premier League.
