= Maak Jou Drome Waar =

Studio album by AB de Villiers and Ampie du Preez
- Released: 2 August 2010
- Recorded: 2009–2010
- Label: Sony Music Africa

Maak Jou Drome Waar (Afrikaans for Make Your Dreams Come True) is a bilingual pop album by South African cricketer AB de Villiers and singer-songwriter Ampie du Preez and was released in South Africa on 2 August 2010. Nine of the 14 tracks on the album are in Afrikaans and five are in English. The tracks consist mainly of power ballads with a "follow-your-dreams" theme and of love songs. The participating artists are signed to the Sony BMG label.

== Single releases ==
"Maak Jou Drome Waar" was the debut single that was pre-released in promotion of the album. It came as a cooperation with his friend Ampie du Preez. An accompanying music video of the song was also launched in April 2010. The popular music video also featured Titans cricketer Faf du Plessis.

There were two more singles from the album: "Forgiveness" featuring rap artist and singer Snotkop and the third was "Deel Van My". "Misunderstood" was promoted as the English-language single from the album.

== Track listing ==
1. "Maak Jou Drome Waar"
2. "Lift"
3. "Forgiveness" (featuring Snotkop)
4. "Madibaland"
5. "Deel Van My"
6. "Misunderstood"
7. "Hoor Jy My"
8. "Stronger"
9. "Sprokie Vir Jou"
10. "Valentyn"
11. "Onthou Jy"
12. "Show Them Who You Are"
13. "Asem In"
14. "Madibaland" (acoustic)
