= AB de Villiers =

South African cricketer (born 1984)

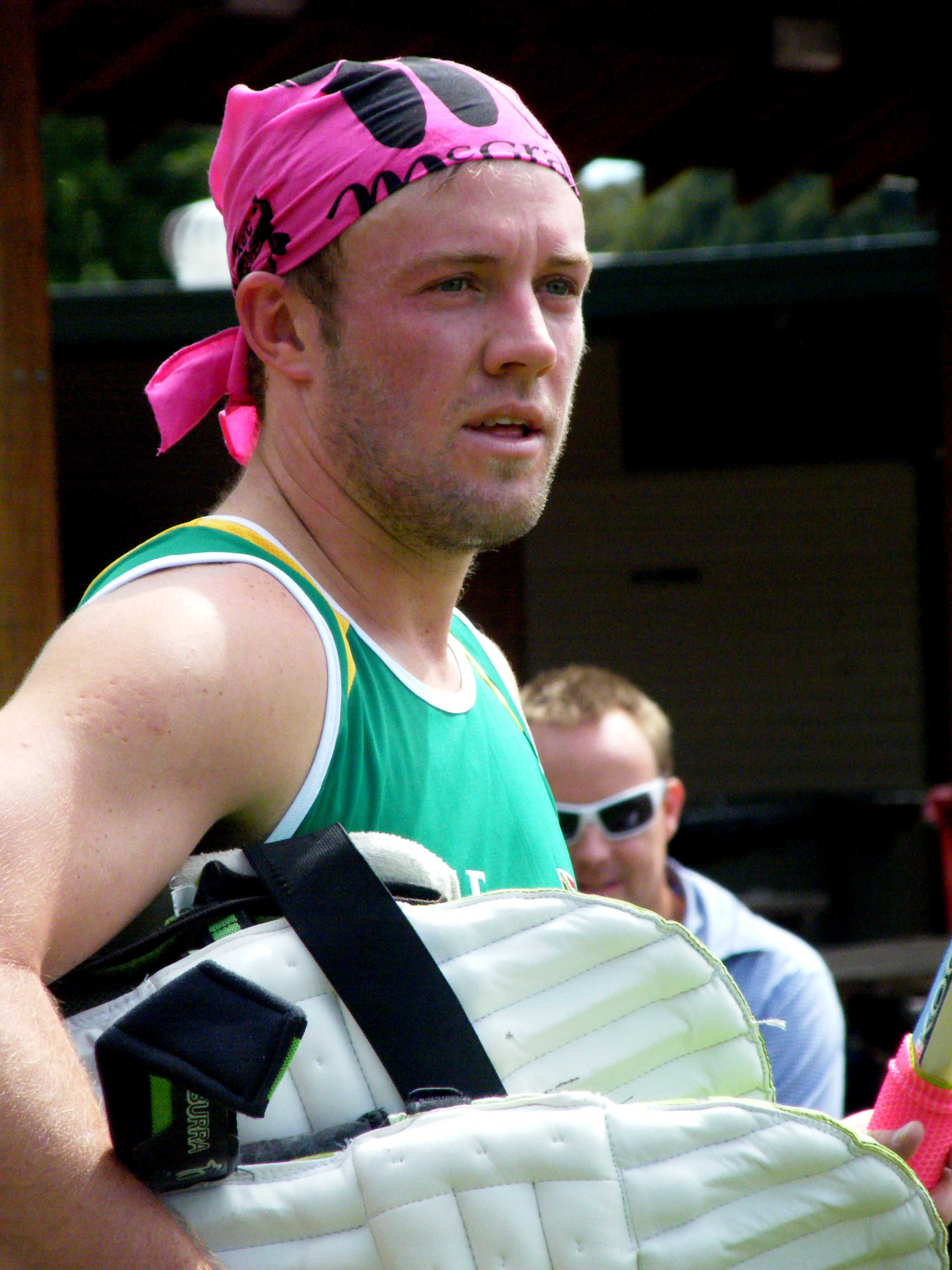
- De Villiers in 2009

Personal information
- Full name: Abraham Benjamin de Villiers
- Born: 17 February 1984 (age 42); Warmbad, Transvaal Province, South Africa
- Nickname: Mr. 360, ABD
- Height: 5 ft 10 in (178 cm)
- Batting: Right-handed
- Bowling: Right arm medium
- Role: Wicket-keeper-batter

International information
- National side: South Africa (2004–2018)
- Test debut (cap 296): 17 December 2004 v England
- Last Test: 30 March 2018 v Australia
- ODI debut (cap 78): 2 February 2005 v England
- Last ODI: 16 February 2018 v India
- ODI shirt no.: 17
- T20I debut (cap 20): 24 February 2006 v Australia
- Last T20I: 29 October 2017 v Bangladesh
- T20I shirt no.: 17

Domestic team information
- Years: Team
- 2003/04–2016/17: Northerns
- 2003/04–2017/18: Titans
- 2008–2010: Delhi Daredevils (squad no. 17)
- 2011–2021: Royal Challengers Bangalore (squad no. 17)
- 2016: Barbados Tridents (squad no. 17)
- 2018–2019: Tshwane Spartans (squad no. 17)
- 2019: Rangpur Riders (squad no. 17)
- 2019: Lahore Qalandars (squad no. 17)
- 2019: Middlesex (squad no. 17)
- 2019/20: Brisbane Heat (squad no. 17)

Career statistics
Competition	Test	ODI	T20I	FC
Matches	114	228	78	141
Runs scored	8,765	9,577	1,672	10,689
Batting average	50.66	53.50	26.12	49.71
100s/50s	22/46	25/53	0/10	25/60
Top score	278*	176	79*	278*
Balls bowled	204	192	–	234
Wickets	2	7	–	2
Bowling average	52.00	28.85	–	69.00
5 wickets in innings	0	0	–	0
10 wickets in match	0	0	–	0
Best bowling	2/49	2/15	–	2/49
Catches/stumpings	222/5	176/5	65/7	275/6
- Source: ESPNcricinfo, 8 December 2023

Abraham Benjamin de Villiers (born 17 February 1984) is a South African former professional cricketer, widely recognised as one of the greatest batters of all time. While primarily a batter, he also played as a wicket-keeper.

He represented South Africa from 2004 to 2018, scoring 8,765 runs in Test matches and 9,577 runs in One Day Internationals (ODIs). He maintained a batting average of over 50 in both formats. As of June 2026, de Villiers is South Africa's second-highest run-scorer in ODIs and fourth-highest in Tests. He also captained the national team in Tests, ODIs, and Twenty20 Internationals (T20Is) during the 2010s.

In domestic cricket, de Villiers started his career in 2003, playing for Northerns and the Titans until 2018. He later joined several Twenty20 leagues around the world. Most notably, he played for the Royal Challengers Bangalore in the Indian Premier League (IPL) from 2011 until he retired from all professional cricket in 2021. Over the course of his career, de Villiers won several major honours. He was named the ICC Men's ODI Cricketer of the Year in 2010, 2014, and 2015, and was selected as one of the five Wisden Cricketers of the Decade in 2019. In 2024, he was inducted into the ICC Cricket Hall of Fame.

== Early life ==
Abraham Benjamin de Villiers was born on 17 February 1984 in Warmbad (modern day Bela-Bela), South Africa to Abraham B de Villiers and Millie de Villiers. He has two elder brothers Jan de Villiers and Wessels de Villiers. He described his childhood days as "really relaxed lifestyle up there, where everyone knows everyone". He was educated at Afrikaanse Hoër Seunskool in Pretoria along with teammate Faf du Plessis, who was and still remains his good friend. He is a high school graduate. His father was a doctor who had played rugby union in his youth, and he encouraged his son to play sports as a child.

== Career ==
De Villiers is a right-handed batter who accumulated 8765 runs in Tests including 22 centuries and 46 fifties. He holds the record for most Test innings without registering a duck (78), before being dismissed for naught against Bangladesh in November 2008. He also holds the second-highest individual score by a South African batsman, with an unbeaten 278. Until 2012 he was an occasional wicket-keeper for South Africa, although after the retirement of regular Test keeper Mark Boucher and under his own captaincy he has started to regularly keep wicket for the national team in Tests, ODIs and T20Is. He gave up wicket-keeping in 2015 and handed the gloves to debutant Quinton de Kock.

He holds the records for the fastest 50 (16 balls), 100 (31 balls) and 150 (64 balls) of all time in One Day Internationals by any batsmen, and also holds the fastest hundred by a South African in Tests and the fastest 50 by South African in T20Is. He is a three-time ICC ODI player of the year, winning the award in 2010, 2014 and 2015.

After the 2011 Cricket World Cup he succeeded Graeme Smith as captain of the national ODI team, and became Test captain after the second Test of the home series against England in 2015/16. He stepped down from Test captaincy in December 2016 due to an elbow injury which kept him out of the team for a long period.

AB de Villiers is claimed by many to be a multifaceted, versatile sportsperson, having excelled in various sports such as golf, rugby, tennis, and hockey. But AB himself admitted that he was never good in other sports except cricket like what others claim to be and also insisted that he never considered himself as a child prodigy. He insisted that he was pretty decent at rugby and golf but refused to admit that he held national records in swimming. He openly made such statements to public and has also mentioned it in his autobiography titled AB: The Autobiography, in response to the "falsehoods and exaggerations" about his all-round abilities.

== International career ==
=== Early career ===
After a spell in the South Africa U19 team, he made his debut for the Titans in 2003/4.

He made his Test debut as a 20-year-old on 16 November 2004 against England at Port Elizabeth. He made a strong impression opening the batting, but was dropped down the order for the second Test and also handed the wicket-keeping gloves. In this match, he made a match-saving half-century from number seven. However, he found himself at the top of the order again for the final Test of the series.

Despite a good tour of the Caribbean where he scored 178 to help South Africa seal a Test series win, his rapid progress was slowed on the tour of Australia in 2005. Despite playing Shane Warne well and becoming the second-youngest and second-fastest South African to reach 1,000 Test runs after Graeme Pollock, he struggled and made just 152 runs in 6 innings. De Villiers was back in form soon and gave the selectors a sign by producing his then highest one-day score of 92 not out, which included 12 fours and one six, from 98 balls against India in the 2006 winter series.

De Villiers had a reputation as an outstanding fielder, typified by a diving run-out of Simon Katich of Australia in 2006, when he dived to stop the ball, and while still lying on his stomach facing away from the stumps, he tossed the ball backwards over his shoulder and effected a direct hit. This has also led people to make further comparisons of him to Jonty Rhodes, who was also one of the finest fielders of his generation. His fielding positions other than wicket-keeper were first and second slip and cover.

=== 2007 Cricket World Cup in West Indies ===
Going into the 2007 Cricket World Cup, de Villiers was in good form in ODIs, having scored four fifties in five matches against India and Pakistan.

In the early stages of the tournament his form was poor with three failures including a duck against the Netherlands in a match where his team broke various records for batting, although he scored a 92 in the first round against Australia.

He made his maiden ODI hundred, 146 from just 130 balls including 5 sixes and 12 fours, in the Super 8 game against West Indies on 10 April 2007. He had to bat with a runner for the latter stages of his innings due to a combination of cramps, heat exhaustion and dehydration. His innings consisted of a second wicket partnership of 170 with Jacques Kallis and a third wicket partnership of 70 with Herschelle Gibbs. De Villiers' innings helped set up a total of 356/4 from 50 overs.

His batting during the World Cup was inconsistent as he failed to score on four occasions, in itself being a record.

=== Gaining attention ===
On 4 April 2008, de Villiers became the first South African to score a double century against India with his top score of 217.

De Villiers scored an obdurate 174 that helped set up a ten-wicket win for South Africa in the second Test against England at Headingley Carnegie in Leeds in July 2008. This was followed by a 97 at The Oval before he came down the wicket trying to smash Monty Panesar for a boundary and was caught on the fence.

In the first Test in Perth, de Villiers scored a match-winning century to help South Africa chase down the second-highest-ever fourth innings target of 414 with six wickets in hand. This was South Africa's first Test victory in Australia in 15 years and appeared to go a long way towards tilting world cricket's balance of power after over a decade of Australian dominance. De Villiers also took four diving catches in the course of the match, including one to dismiss Jason Krejza, a stunner at backward point.

De Villiers only scored 11 runs in the second Test at the Melbourne Cricket Ground and made another low score in the first innings of the final Test at the Sydney Cricket Ground. In the second innings of that Test though, de Villiers scored a patient half-century as South Africa almost held on for an against-the-odds draw.

During ODI series, in the 4th ODI in Adelaide, he played as wicket-keeper after Boucher was ruled out. He then scored 82 not out from 85 balls with 6 fours and a six to win the series and was named the man of the match.

In the first Test of the return series at the Wanderers Stadium, de Villiers provided lone resistance in the first innings against a bowling attack led by pace bowler, Mitchell Johnson, scoring 104* off 185 balls with 9 fours and 1 six, while his teammates all fell for under 50. But in the second innings he made only 3 off 7.

In the third Test, after centuries from Ashwell Prince and Jacques Kallis, de Villiers was the third centurion of the innings with a score of 163 off 196 balls with 12 fours and 7 sixes. This knock also tied the record for most sixes in an over as de Villiers, off the bowling of McDonald, hit four consecutive sixes.

In the following 5-game ODI series, de Villiers played consistently, although starting badly in the first game, scoring only 2 runs. However, he went on to make 36*, 80, 84 and 38 and was named Player of the Series at the conclusion of game 5.

He was rested for the two-match Twenty20 series against Zimbabwe and because Mark Boucher was injured as well Heino Kuhn donned the keeping gloves. De Villiers returned for the ODI series and also took over the gloves while Boucher was recovering. He did well against Zimbabwe scoring two centuries out of the three ODIs as South Africa comfortably won the three match series 3–0.

His major challenge came against Pakistan for the two Twenty20 matches, where he kept wicket. In the first match, he was out for a second-ball duck off a superb delivery by Shoaib Akhtar. In the second T20I he scored 11 runs. He then participated in the five-match ODI series where South Africa were chasing 203 to win and he scored 51 before he was caught and bowled by Saeed Ajmal. In the second ODI he scored 29 as he was bowled by Shahid Afridi; in the same match, a flamboyant Abdul Razzaq played the greatest innings of his life to lift Pakistan to an unbelievable victory. During the third match, he scored 19 before he was stumped by Zulqarnain Haider. It turned out to be a mistake by the umpire as he had pressed the wrong button. In the fourth match, he missed out on a half-century while on 49 when he gave his wicket to the fielder at point. His good form in the series continued when he scored 61 in the final ODI as South Africa won by 57 runs and the series 3–2.

For his performances in 2009 and 2010, he was named in the World Test XI by the ICC, and was also named in the World ODI XI in 2010.

=== 2011 Cricket World Cup ===
AB de Villiers scored two successive centuries in the 2011 World Cup. He became the first South African to score two centuries in a single World Cup and the fifth batsman after Mark Waugh, Saeed Anwar, Rahul Dravid and Matthew Hayden to score two consecutive centuries in a single World Cup tournament. He also became the 16th batsman to score two or more centuries in one World Cup tournament. His strike rate of 136.73 is the highest among South African batsmen who have scored centuries in World Cup matches. With his third player of the match award in World Cups, de Villiers is joint second with Jacques Kallis on the list of South African players with most match awards in World Cups. Lance Klusener heads the list with five awards.

=== Rising through the ranks ===
On 6 June 2011, then South Africa coach Gary Kirsten announced that de Villiers would be South Africa's new limited-overs captain. "I'm very excited but I'm also inexperienced. But I've learnt a lot the last seven years from an unbelievable captain," said de Villiers, who had never captained a team at first-class level. "It's a big responsibility, but there'll be a fresh look in the team, which is good."

In the 2011–12 South African summer, de Villiers featured in the home series against Australia and against Sri Lanka. In the latter, he scored a century (160 not out) in South Africa's win in the third and deciding Test of the series. He was named the Player of the Series, having scored 353 runs at an average of 117.66. He then led South Africa for his first series since being appointed captain of the One Day International team. In his first match as captain, South Africa inflicted the heaviest defeat in Sri Lanka's history, with a 258-run win in Paarl on 11 January 2012. It was also the largest margin of victory (by runs) in an ODI match between two Test-playing teams. South Africa went on to win the ODI series, and de Villiers was named player of the series, having scored 329 runs at an average of 109.66, including a century (125 not out) in the fifth and final match in Johannesburg. On 10 July, de Villiers was handed full-time wicket-keeping duties after Mark Boucher announced retirement from cricket after suffering eye injuries from a hit from a bail the day before.

On 4 February 2013, de Villiers equaled Jack Russell's record of 11 dismissals in a match. He also scored an unbeaten 103 off 117 balls in South Africa's second innings of the same match. In the process, he became the first wicket-keeper to score a century and claim 10 dismissals in a Test.

On 18 March, during the third ODI match of Pakistan's tour of South Africa at Johannesburg, de Villiers and Hashim Amla shared the record for the highest third-wicket partnership in an ODI when they scored 238. De Villiers scored 12 fours and 3 sixes, and a total of 128.

=== Record breaking year ===
On 18 January 2015, de Villiers scored both the fastest fifty and the fastest century by a batsman in One Day International cricket, off 16 balls and 31 balls respectively and eventually scoring 149 runs off 44 balls in 59.5 minutes against West Indies.

=== 2015 World Cup ===
De Villiers was one of the top performers at the 2015 Cricket World Cup scoring 482 runs at an average of 96.0 and strike rate of 144.0 during the tournament.

On 27 February 2015, he scored 162 runs off 66 balls in a match against the West Indies in Pool B, leading South Africa to their second-highest total in World Cup history (408), at Sydney Cricket Ground. With this feat, he became the record holder for the fastest 50, 100 and 150 in ODI history.

Under his captaincy, South Africa qualified for the semi-finals of the World Cup but lost to New Zealand in the match. De Villiers finished the tournament as the third-highest run-scorer with 482 runs, behind Martin Guptill and Kumar Sangakkara.

At the end of the tournament, he was ranked number 1 in the ICC batsmen rating in One day International cricket and number 3 in the ICC batsmen rating in Test cricket. He was named in the 'Team of the Tournament' for the 2015 World Cup by the ICC.

=== 2016–2018 and retirement ===
On 6 January 2016, the second Test match between England and South Africa ended in a draw. After the end of the match, Hashim Amla resigned from the captaincy and de Villiers was chosen to captain South Africa for the last two matches.

On 21 February 2016, de Villiers scored the fastest T20I fifty by a South African, in just 21 balls. He completed the innings with 79 runs in 29 balls and led South Africa to a clean sweep in the T20I series.

On 18 January 2017, de Villiers ruled himself out from most of the Test matches and ultimately played in December 2017. However, a day before the Test match, Faf du Plessis picked up a viral infection, putting him in doubt for the match. On the morning of the Test, he was ruled out of the fixture, with AB de Villiers replacing him as captain. He also kept wicket during the match, as South Africa's wicket-keeper Quinton de Kock suffered a hamstring injury while batting on day one. He took eight catches in the match and the Test match finished inside two days, with South Africa winning by an innings and 120 runs.

De Villiers returned for the Indian tour to South Africa in 2018. He stated he had given up wicket-keeping as his back could no longer handle the demand, and Faf du Plessis resumed his role as captain in all forms of the game.

In the second Test match against Australia, he scored his 22nd Test century with a score of 126 not out off 146 balls in the first innings. His performance helped the team win the match by 6 wickets.

On 23 May 2018, de Villiers announced his retirement from all forms of international cricket through a video uploaded to Twitter, in which he explained his decision. One of the statements in his monologue was "I have had my turn, and to be honest, I am tired." A few weeks after his announcement about retiring from international cricket, he clarified and said that he will continue playing T20 leagues for a few more years. During the 2019 ICC Cricket World Cup, and following South Africa losing their first three matches in the tournament, details emerged of de Villiers making himself available for selection for the national team squad on the day the squad was to be announced. He was not selected as he had not played any international cricket for his country leading up to the tournament, despite having been prompted to do so by South Africa's coach Ottis Gibson earlier in the year.

In January 2020, it was rumoured that de Villiers was in talks to make a comeback to the South African T20I team for the 2020 ICC Men's T20 World Cup. De Villiers, as well as South African director of cricket Graeme Smith and head coach Mark Boucher, confirmed these rumours.

In November 2020, de Villiers was nominated for the Sir Garfield Sobers Award for ICC Male Cricketer of the Decade, and the award for ODI cricketer of the decade.

=== International centuries ===
De Villiers has scored 22 Test and 25 ODI centuries. He scored his first Test century against England in 2005 and his first ODI century against West Indies in 2007. He also holds the world record for the fastest 100 and 150 in One-Day Internationals.

== Domestic and franchise career ==
Domestically de Villiers first played for Northerns, making his debut for the team in the 2003/04 Supersport Series. The team merged with Easterns to form the Titans team which de Villiers then played for in the 2004/05 season. His international duties mean that he has played only occasionally for the team since 2005, making a total of only nine first-class, 20 List A and 24 Twenty20 appearances for the team.

=== Twenty20 franchise career ===
Since joining the league in its inaugural season, de Villiers has become one of the most successful batsmen in the Indian Premier League (IPL). After originally playing for Delhi Daredevils, he moved to Royal Challengers Bangalore (RCB) for US$1.5 million in the league's fourth season. Three of his four Twenty20 centuries have come in the IPL and he has played in over 150 matches in the league. Following his retirement from international cricket, his future in T20 franchise leagues was uncertain until he announced in July 2018 that he intended to continue to play in the IPL for "a few years". He announced his retirement from IPL on 19 November 2021 following the conclusion of 14th edition of IPL. He said that he would rejoin RCB for the 2023 season, but not as a player.

On 17 May 2022, de Villiers was inducted into the RCB Hall of Fame for his contributions to the team from 2011 to 2021.

Other than the IPL, de Villiers has played franchise T20 cricket for Barbados Tridents, Tshwane Spartans, Rangpur Riders, Middlesex, Brisbane Heat and Lahore Qalandars in leagues across the world. He has been criticised for his decision to play in franchise leagues rather than for his country.

== Playing style ==
He is sometimes referred to as "Mr. 360" due to his ability to play shots all around the wicket, and as "Superman" due to his acrobatic fielding. In T20 cricket he is seen as an attacking batsman who plays a range of unconventional shots.

== Awards and honours ==
- ICC Men's ODI Cricketer of the Year: 2010, 2014, 2015.
- ICC Men's Test Team of the Year: 2009, 2011, 2012 (12th man), 2013, 2014.
- ICC Men's ODI Team of the Year: 2010, 2011, 2013, 2014, 2015, 2016, 2017.
- CSA Cricketer of the Year: 2014, 2015.
- ESPNcricinfo Men's ODI batting performance of the year: 2015.
- ICC Men's ODI Team Of The Decade: 2011–2020.
- ICC Men's T20I Team Of The Decade: 2011–2020.
- RCB Hall of Fame: 2022.
- ICC Hall of Fame: 2024.

== Personal life ==
De Villiers proposed to his girlfriend, Danielle Swart, at the Taj Mahal in 2012, after five years of dating. The couple got married on 30 March 2013, in Bela-Bela, South Africa. They have two sons and one daughter.

He is a devout Christian and has stated that his faith is crucial to his approach to life. He is also an accomplished guitar player and a singer. In 2010, he released a bilingual pop album entitled Maak Jou Drome Waar with his friend and South African singer Ampie du Preez. His autobiography, AB de Villiers – the Autobiography, was released in September 2016. He is the most-followed South African on Instagram.
