= English cricket team in Sri Lanka in 2011–12 =

International cricket tour

	Sri Lanka	England
- Dates: 15 March 2012 – 7 April 2012
Captains	Mahela Jayawardene	Andrew Strauss

Test series
- Result: 2-match series drawn 1–1
Most runs	Mahela Jayawardene (354)	Kevin Pietersen (226)
Most wickets	Rangana Herath (19)	Graeme Swann (16)
- Player of the series: Mahela Jayawardene (SL)

The England cricket team toured Sri Lanka from 26 March to 7 April 2012. The tour included two Tests between Sri Lanka and England. With England's victory in the Second Test, they retained their top spot on the world Test rankings.

== Squads ==
Sri Lanka	England
Mahela Jayawardene (c); Thilan Samaraweera (vc); Dinesh Chandimal (wk); Tillakaratne Dilshan; Rangana Herath; Prasanna Jayawardene (wk); Suranga Lakmal; Angelo Mathews; Tharanga Paranavitana; Dhammika Prasad; Suraj Randiv; Kumar Sangakkara; Chamara Silva; Lahiru Thirimanne; Chanaka Welegedara	Andrew Strauss (c); Alastair Cook (vc); James Anderson; Ian Bell; Ravi Bopara; Tim Bresnan; Stuart Broad; Steven Davies (wk); Steven Finn; Monty Panesar; Samit Patel; Kevin Pietersen; Matt Prior (wk); Graeme Swann; James Tredwell; Jonathan Trott

== Tour matches ==
=== First-class: Sri Lanka Board XI vs England XI ===
15–17 March
Scorecard

Sri Lanka Board XI	v	England XI
169 (73.3 overs); Ashen Silva 66 (179); Monty Panesar 5/37 (23.3 overs)		303/8d (100 overs); Alastair Cook 163* (293); Malinga Bandara 3/58 (24 overs)
119 (56.4 overs); Dimuth Karunaratne 31 (71); James Anderson 3/21 (11.4 overs)

England XI won by an innings and 15 runs
R. Premadasa Stadium, Colombo
Umpires: Ravindra Kottahachchi (SL) and Raveendra Wimalasiri (SL)

- Sri Lanka Board XI won the toss and elected to bat.

=== First-class: Sri Lanka Cricket Development XI vs England XI ===
20–22 March
Scorecard

Sri Lanka Cricket Development XI	v	England XI
431/6d (100 overs); Chamara Silva 163 (180); Stuart Broad 3/69 (18 overs)		272/4d (66 overs); Jonathan Trott 101 (141); Tharanga Lakshitha 1/29 (12 overs)
199/4d (34 overs); Angelo Perera 90* (70); Tim Bresnan 1/16 (6 overs)		360/6 (60.4 overs); Matt Prior 84 (60); Vishwa Fernando 2/72 (13 overs)

England XI won by 4 wickets
Sinhalese Sports Club Ground, Colombo
Umpires: Nilan De Silva (SL) and Tyron Wijewardene (SL)

- Sri Lanka Cricket Development XI won the toss and decided to bat

== Test series ==
=== 1st Test ===
26–29 March
Scorecard

Sri Lanka	v	England
318 (96.3 overs); Mahela Jayawardene 180 (315); James Anderson 5/72 (20.3 overs)		193 (46.4 overs); Ian Bell 52 (87); Rangana Herath 6/74 (19 overs)
214 (84.3 overs); Prasanna Jayawardene 61* (123); Graeme Swann 6/82 (30 overs)		264 (99 overs); Jonathan Trott 112 (266); Rangana Herath 6/97 (38 overs)

Sri Lanka won by 75 runs
Galle International Stadium, Galle
Umpires: Asad Rauf (Pak) and Rod Tucker (Aus)
Player of the match: Rangana Herath (SL)

- Sri Lanka won the toss and elected to bat.
- Samit Patel (Eng) made his Test debut.

=== 2nd Test ===
3–7 April
Scorecard

Sri Lanka	v	England
275 (111.1 overs); Mahela Jayawardene 105 (216); Graeme Swann 4/75 (28.1 overs)		460 (152.3 overs); Kevin Pietersen 151 (165); Rangana Herath 6/133 (53 overs)
278 (118.5 overs); Mahela Jayawardene 64 (191); Graeme Swann 6/106 (40 overs)		97/2 (19.4 overs); Alastair Cook 49* (69); Rangana Herath 1/37 (9 overs)

England won by 8 wickets
Paikiasothy Saravanamuttu Stadium, Colombo
Umpires: Asad Rauf (Pak) and Bruce Oxenford (Aus)
Player of the match: Kevin Pietersen (Eng)

- Sri Lanka won the toss and elected to bat.
