= Samit Patel =

English cricketer (born 1984)

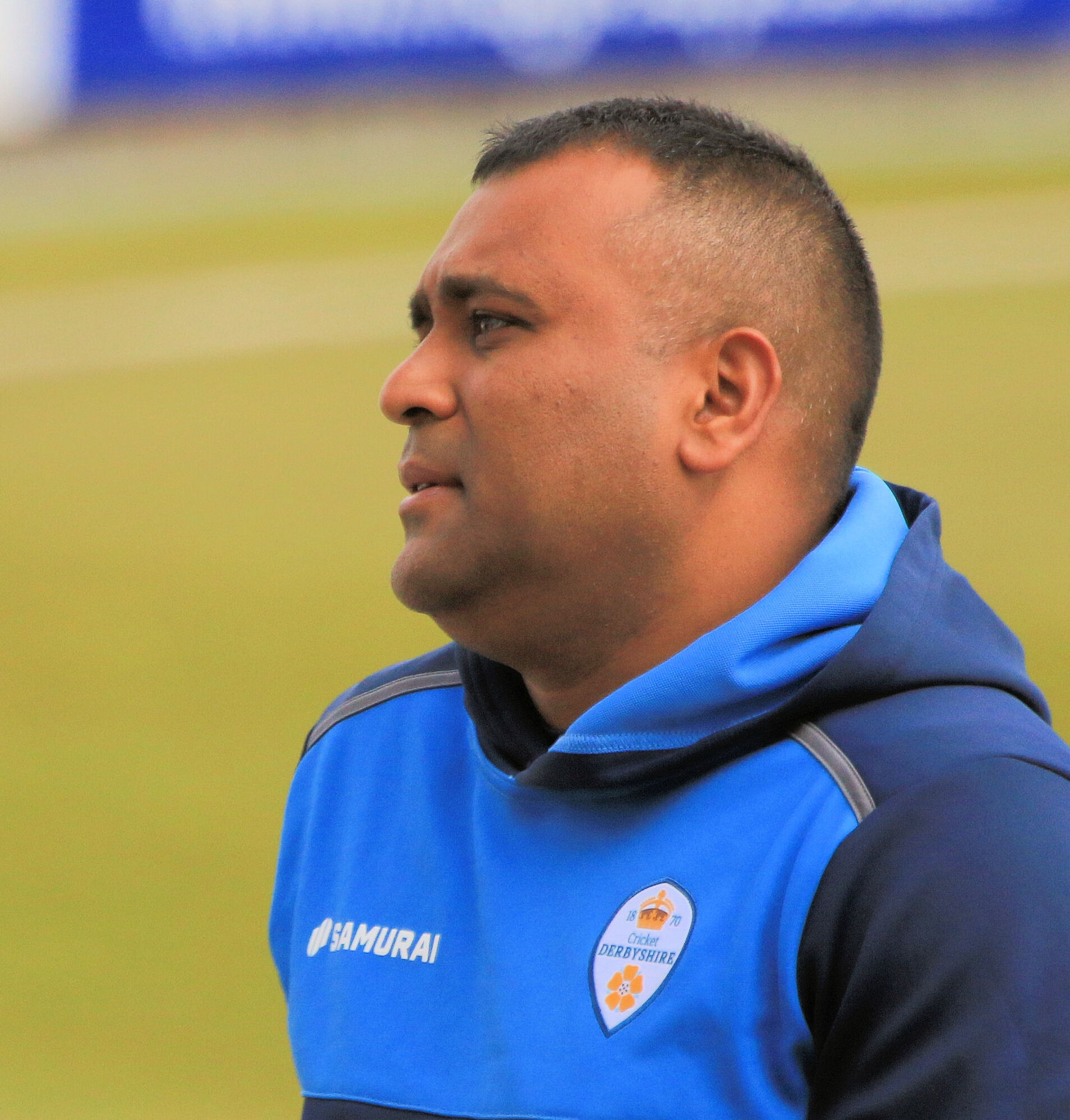
- Patel in 2024

Personal information
- Full name: Samit Patel
- Born: 30 November 1984 (age 41); Leicester, Leicestershire, England
- Height: 5 ft 8 in (1.73 m)
- Batting: Right-handed
- Bowling: Slow left-arm orthodox
- Role: All-rounder
- Relatives: Akhil Patel (brother)

International information
- National side: England (2008–2015)
- Test debut (cap 651): 26 March 2012 v Sri Lanka
- Last Test: 1 November 2015 v Pakistan
- ODI debut (cap 207): 18 August 2008 v Scotland
- Last ODI: 27 January 2013 v India
- ODI shirt no.: 29

Domestic team information
- Years: Team
- 2002–2023: Nottinghamshire
- 2012/13: Warriors
- 2013/14: Mohammedan Sporting Club
- 2016–2017: Rajshahi Kings
- 2017/18: Wellington
- 2018–2019: Islamabad United
- 2019: → Glamorgan (on loan)
- 2019/20: Melbourne Renegades
- 2020–2022: Lahore Qalandars
- 2020: Dambulla Viiking
- 2021–2023: Trent Rockets
- 2021: St Lucia Kings
- 2021: Galle Gladiators
- 2022–2023: Trinbago Knight Riders
- 2023: Sylhet Strikers
- 2024–2025: Derbyshire
- 2025: Northern Superchargers

Career statistics
Competition	Test	ODI	FC	LA
Matches	6	36	231	253
Runs scored	151	482	12,692	6,342
Batting average	16.77	32.13	35.65	34.65
100s/50s	0/0	0/1	26/64	8/33
Top score	42	70*	257*	129*
Balls bowled	858	1,187	26,909	8,737
Wickets	7	24	357	236
Bowling average	60.14	45.45	38.23	33.17
5 wickets in innings	0	1	5	2
10 wickets in match	0	0	1	0
Best bowling	2/27	5/41	7/68	6/13
Catches/stumpings	3/–	7/–	140/–	72/–
- Source: ESPNcricinfo, 4 August 2025

Samit Rohit Patel (born 30 November 1984) is an English cricketer, and has represented England national team. He is a right-handed batsman and a slow left-arm bowler who has played domestically for Nottinghamshire County Cricket Club and Derbyshire County Cricket Club. Patel made his One Day International debut for England in August 2008, however was later dropped from the team after failing to meet fitness levels. After an absence of 2 1/2 years, he returned to the ODI team in 2011 and made his Twenty20 International debut, before becoming the 651st player to represent England at Test cricket by winning his first cap on the tour of Sri Lanka in 2012.

In June 2021, during the 2021 t20 Blast, Patel became the first English player to do the double in T20 cricket of taking 250 wickets and scoring 5,000 runs.

== Early and personal life ==
Patel was born in Leicester on 30 November 1984, to Rohit and Sejal. His parents originated from Bhavnagar, Gujarat, India, where he has relatives. Patel's brother Akhil (b. 1990) has also played for Nottinghamshire, making his debut in 2009. Patel was educated at Eastwood Comprehensive School but later studied at Worksop College in north Nottinghamshire where he was a member of the 1st XI cricket team for five seasons. While at the college, Patel represented England at under 15, under-17 and under-19 levels. He helped them record wins over such schools as Repton, Manchester Grammar School and Shrewsbury School and such clubs as the Marylebone Cricket Club (MCC).

=== Fitness issues ===
Having been previously included in England's ODI and T20 squads for the tour of the West Indies in March and April 2009, Patel was dropped over fitness concerns. Hugh Morris, the director of English cricket, stated that "Samit Patel is a talented cricketer but he, like every other player who joins the senior England team, must be aware of the strict fitness criteria that has been set. It is extremely frustrating that Samit has not heeded the warnings of his county, Nottinghamshire, and Geoff Miller [national selector] as well as the England management and strength and conditioning team. In the circumstances we had no option but to de select him from the tour ... his fitness levels have regressed between his first assessment during the build up to the England Lions tour and the second Test during the first week in New Zealand." Despite the setback, in April 2009 Patel was selected for England's 25-man performance squad. Having worked to improve his fitness, Patel said "I have had to accept some difficult truths ... I don't want to be in a position again where I miss out on selection because of a lack of fitness". Initially included in the 30-man preliminary squad for the 2009 ICC World Twenty20, Patel failed to make the final 15-man squad because of ongoing fitness problems. Geoff Miller commented "I'm disappointed for us and for him, but we've laid down the rules and players have to abide by them. He feels he's been putting the work and time in, but he cannot explain it – the figures are there". In September 2009, a year after he was granted an incremental contract with the ECB, Patel's England contract was not renewed for 2009–2010. He remained on the fringes of selection, however his level of fitness prevented his selection. In January 2010, Miller stated that "He knows what is required ... the ball is in his court now and he has to go away and understand what is necessary". When England's provisional 30-man squad for the 2011 World Cup was announced in December that year, Patel was included. England coach Andy Flower had commented that Patel's style of play would be well suited to the pitches in the Indian subcontinent, which was hosting the tournament, however persistent fitness problems meant he was not selected in the final squad of 15 and not called up when the squad sustained injuries.

== Domestic and T20 career ==
Since making his debut for Nottinghamshire at the age of 16, Patel has featured consistently in the team, in both first-class and List A matches. He became the only man in the history of the English Twenty20 competition to claim a double-wicket-maiden, when Nottinghamshire played Derbyshire at New Road, Worcester in 2006. He scored 887 runs in the County Championship in 2007 including four centuries – he also took 10 wickets and topped the county's bowling averages. In the 2008 season, Patel made a steady start to Nottinghamshire's first-class campaign, scoring a century against Durham and three half-centuries. Nottinghamshire were runners-up to Durham in the 2009 County Championship; from 15 matches Patel scored 712 runs (the 4th most for the club that year) at an average of 30.95, with a highest score of 95. He also took 32 wickets at an average of 47.84, with two five wicket hauls. In January 2010, Patel signed a three-year deal with Nottinghamshire. He part funded a journey to the Darren Lehmann Cricket Academy in Australia where he spent February and March, part of which was aimed at improving his fitness. When Nottinghamshire won the County Championship in 2010, Patel contributed fewer runs: 641 from 16 matches at an average of 26.70, making him the club's 6th highest run-scorer in the year's competition. His solitary century in the competition, an innings of 104 from 185 balls, came in a defeat to Somerset in July.

In July 2019, he was selected to play for the Rotterdam Rhinos in the inaugural edition of the Euro T20 Slam cricket tournament. However, the following month the tournament was cancelled. On 17 September 2020, in the 2020 t20 Blast, Patel played in his 100th consecutive T20 match for the Notts Outlaws. In October 2020, he was drafted by the Dambulla Hawks for the inaugural edition of the Lanka Premier League. In November 2021, he was selected to play for the Galle Gladiators following the players' draft for the 2021 Lanka Premier League. In April 2022, he was bought by the Trent Rockets for the 2022 season of The Hundred.

At the end of the 2023 English season, Patel left Nottinghamshire after 22 years when the club did not offer him a new contract. He joined Midlands rivals Derbyshire on a two-year contract and was named as the club's white ball captain. In his second appearance for Derbyshire, Patel put in a man-of-the-match winning performance, taking 2/21 and scoring 64, as his new team defeated Leicestershire by six wickets in the T20 Blast on 1 June 2024. During two seasons, Patel played 33 times for Derbyshire, across T20 and List A formats, scoring 523 runs and taking 33 wickets with his final match for the club coming on 18 July 2025.

On 25 April 2026, Patel announced his retirement from English domestic cricket following an ECB ban for participating in an unsanctioned legends T20 tournament. Having scored more than 21,000 runs and taken more than 700 wickets for Nottinghamshire, his retirement marked the end of a 24-year county career.

== International career ==
=== 2008 Scotland and South Africa ===
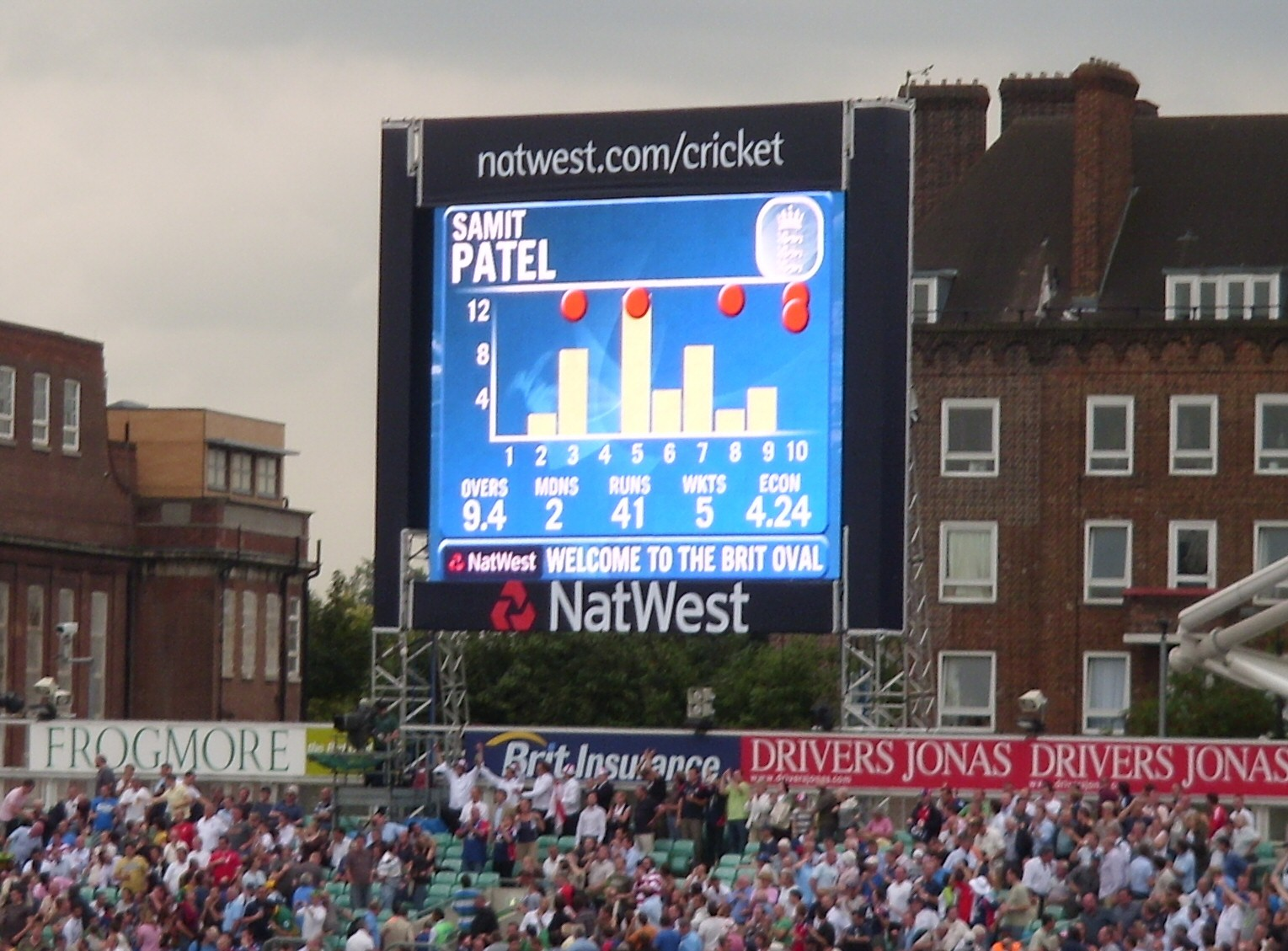
The big screen at The Oval records Patel's man of the match winning bowling versus South Africa on 29 August 2008

Patel made his debut for England's senior one-day team in a match against Scotland on 18 August 2008. His first wicket was that of Neil McCallum and he finished with figures of 1/22 from seven overs; he also took a catch and ran out the Scotland captain, Ryan Watson. Patel remained part of England's ODI team for the series against South Africa later that summer, taking the notable wicket of Herschelle Gibbs in the first ODI of the series at Headingley. He recorded figures of 5/41 and scored 31 runs off 49 balls in the third ODI to win the man of the match award as England claimed the series. In September 2008, it was announced that Patel and six other players – the group was mostly made up of ODI specialists – would be given incremental contracts with the England Cricket Board (ECB).

=== 2008 India ===
Patel played in the first ODI against India. India scored 387, with Patel taking figures of 2–78. He scored a run a ball 28 in reply, but England lost by 158 runs. India also won the second ODI, with Patel taking 0–37 and making with the bat. Patel made 26 in the third ODI as England were bowled out for 240, and again failed to make an impact with the ball. Patel took his third wicket of the series in the next match, but England again lost, this time by 19 runs on the DL Method, to go 4–0 down in the series. England lost the final game of the series, with Patel not required with the bat and he again failed to make an impact with the ball.

=== 2011 Sri Lanka and Ireland ===
Samit Patel facing his first ball in ODIs since November 2008. Playing against Sri Lanka, he was dismissed for 8 runs from 14 balls.

Patel was recalled to the England squad in June 2011 to face Sri Lanka in a T20I and five ODIs. Miller explained that Patel had been selected due to "excellent form and plenty of hard work". He made his Twenty20 International debut on 25 June against Sri Lanka; Patel was run out without scoring and bowled two wicketless overs as England succumbed to a nine-wicket defeat. For the fifth and final match of the ODI series, Patel returned to play his first ODI since November 2008. He scored eight runs and took 1/49. Patel also played in the one-off game against Ireland, which England won by 11 runs on the DL Method. He took one wicket and scored 13 runs.

=== 2011 India ===
Patel was named in the England squad which enjoyed success over India on home soil. He played in the first two matches of the series, taking figures of 1–42 in the first match which had no result due to rain. In the second match England won by seven wickets, with Patel bowling just one over for eleven runs. He returned in the fifth match of the series, and while he was not required to bat, he took figures of 0–55 as England won by six wickets.

In October, England toured India for five ODIs and a T20I. Although England lost the series 5–0, Patel scored 160 runs and took four wickets at an average of 45.50. In the first ODI he took 1–49 and made 16 with the bat. In the second match he made 42 but didn't take any wickets as England lost eight wickets. During the third ODI Patel scored his maiden half-century, 70 from 43 balls, beating his previous highest score in the format of 42. In the fourth ODI he made very little impact with the bat or ball as England slumped to another defeat, while in the final match of the series he took three wickets and made 18 with the bat.

Patel had been in the preliminary list for the player auction ahead of the 2012 Indian Premier League but opted to withdraw to concentrate on English domestic cricket as participating would have meant missing up to seven County Championship matches.

=== 2012 Pakistan and Sri Lanka ===
The new year began with Patel's inclusion in the England Lions squad to tour Sri Lanka in late January and early February 2012 for a one-day series. Patel played in all five matches and scored 128 runs with a highest score of 50, and was the leading wicket-taker on either team in the series with 12 wickets. When the ODI squad to face Pakistan was announced in February Patel was included. In the first ODI he made an unbeaten 17 and took 3–26, as England won by 130 runs. England won the next game by 20 runs, with Patel taking figures of 2–51. Patel was not required to bat in the third game, as England recorded a nine wicket victory. England won the fourth game by nine wickets, although Patel did not pick up a wicket. During the series, which England won 4–0, Patel was given an incremental contract by the ECB.

England had suffered a 3–0 defeats in the Tests against Pakistan and when they toured Sri Lanka in March, struggling batsman Eoin Morgan was dropped and Patel was selected in the Test squad for the first time. Patel played in both Tests against Sri Lanka, batting at number 7 England lost the first Test by 75 runs, with Patel taking 2–27 in Sri Lanka's first innings, although he did not pick up a wicket in the second. He made scores of two and nine and was dismissed each time by a spin bowler. In the second match, which England won by 8 wickets, he took figures of 0–32 in Sri Lanka's first innings before making 29 with the bat. He took a wicket in the second innings to help put England in control and they went on to win the match. Patel began the English season in April with a run of low scores, amassing 33 runs from his first four innings.

=== 2012 Australia and South Africa ===
He was selected for the final two matches of the series against Australia. In the fourth match he did not take a wicket and was not required to bat as England won by eight wickets. In the fit ODI he finished with figures of 0–17 and was again not required with the bat as England won by seven wickets on the DL Method. He played in the second ODI against South Africa, after taking 0–47 he top scored for England with 45 with the bat, but it wasn't enough to prevent an England defeat. In the next match he finished off the innings for England, scoring an unbeaten 13 to help England to a four wicket victory. England won the fourth ODI by 6 wickets, with Patel bowling economically and finishing with figures of 0–28. Patel could only make nine in the final match of the series, as South Africa secured a convincing seven wicket victory.

=== 2012 T20 World Cup ===
Patel made his first appearance of the tournament against Afghanistan, and finished up with exceptional figures, taking 2–6 off three overs, as England won by 116 runs. He also played against the West Indies, but was more expensive, finishing with figures of 0–38, with England losing by 15 runs. He played in England's final match of the tournament against Sri Lanka, when he topped score with 67 as England reached 150, 19 runs short of Sri Lanka's total. England failed to qualify for the semi-finals.

=== 2012/13 India ===
Patel played in the first Test against India, but struggled with bat and ball. After taking 1/96 in the first innings, he didn't take a wicket in the second innings and scored just ten runs in the match as England lost by nine wickets. Batting at six, he scored 26 in England's first innings of the second Test, but did not take a wicket as England won by ten wickets. In the third Test, Patel did not bowl in India's first innings, but scored 33 in England's reply as they built a big lead. He only bowled one over in the second innings as England won by eight wickets. In the first ODI, Patel scored an unbeaten 44 as England won by nine runs. He scored an unbeaten 30 in the next match but England were bowled out for 158 and lost the match. Patel was dismissed for a duck in the next match as England suffered a seven wicket defeat. He played a limited role in the next match, scoring just one and bowling just three overs as England lost by five wickets. England won the final match of the series, after scoring 226 in the first innings. Patel took figures of 1–46 in India's reply as England won by seven wickets.

=== 2013 New Zealand ===
Patel played in the two T20 internationals against New Zealand. England won by 40 runs, with Patel taking 0–17. He kept his place for the next match, but was expensive, bowling two overs for 20 runs. He was run out for six with the bat and New Zealand won by 55 runs.

=== 2015 Pakistan ===
After a three-year absence from England's Test squad, Patel was called up for England's series against Pakistan in October 2015 after Zafar Ansari was ruled out with a hand injury. He played in the third Test, and took figures of 2–85 in Pakistan's first innings before making 42 with the bat. He took 1–79 in Pakistan's second innings but was then dismissed for a duck as England lost by 127 runs.
