= Caythorpe Cricket Club =

Team information
- Founded: 1880
- Home ground: Caythorpe Road, Caythorpe

History
- Notts Premier 2 wins: 1
- Official website: Website

Caythorpe Cricket Club was founded in 1880. It is an amateur English Cricket Club based in the village of Caythorpe, Nottinghamshire. The club competes in the Nottinghamshire Cricket Board Premier League, which is an accredited ECB Premier League, winning the league title in 2006. The club has also reached the semi-final of the ECB National Club Cricket Championship in 2005 and 2006 and won the Derbyshire Premier League Cup in 2009.

Caythorpe has four Saturday teams and a Sunday team, as well as many junior teams as part of its setup. The 1st XI compete in the Nottinghamshire Cricket Board Premier League, winning the title in 2006. The 2nd XI play in the Bassetlaw & District Cricket League and won 1st division in 2013, then getting promotion into the premier division for the 2014 season. Both the 3rd XI and 4 XI play in the South Nottinghamshire Cricket league. The club set up its Women's section in 2020 and had a highly successful inaugural year, winning the East Midlands Women's Cricket League, Division 1, gaining promotion to the Premier Division. They currently have a long format Women's Team and a Super 8s Hundred Team. The club also boasts a large junior section with teams from U10s up to U19s.

== Notable former players ==
Caythorpe has enjoyed the services of many top professionals, including:

- Eddie Hemmings (cricketer) (Warwickshire CCC, Notts and Sussex CCC; England)
- Jamie Hart (cricketer) (Nottinghamshire CCC)
- Christopher Curzon (Hampshire CCC and Notts)
- Richard Bates (cricketer) (Notts)
- Graeme Archer (Notts)
- James Hindson (cricketer) (Nottinghamshire CCC)
- Russell Warren (cricketer) (Northants CCC and Notts)
- Ian Saxelby (Notts and Gloucestershire CCC)
- Guy Welton (Notts)
- Stephen Randall (Notts)
- David Lucas (cricketer) (Notts and Northants)
- Ben Phillips (cricketer) (Kent CCC, Northants and Somerset CCC and Notts)
