= James Hindson =

English cricketer

Personal information
- Full name: James Edward Hindson
- Born: 13 September 1973 (age 53); Huddersfield, Yorkshire, England
- Batting: Right-handed
- Bowling: Slow left-arm orthodox

Domestic team information
- Years: Team
- 2000-2002: Nottinghamshire Cricket Board
- 1992-1998: Nottinghamshire

Career statistics
Competition	FC	LA
Matches	28	30
Runs scored	384	174
Batting average	13.24	21.75
100s/50s	–/1	–/–
Top score	53*	41*
Balls bowled	5,827	1,116
Wickets	93	21
Bowling average	32.74	46.09
5 wickets in innings	7	–
10 wickets in match	2	–
Best bowling	5/42	4/19
Catches/stumpings	14/–	9/–
- Source: Cricinfo, 23 November 2010

James Edward Hindson (born 13 September 1973) is an English cricketer. Hindson is a right-handed batsman who bowls slow left-arm orthodox. He was born at Huddersfield, Yorkshire.

Hindson made his first-class debut for Nottinghamshire against Cambridge University in 1992. From 1992 to 1997, he represented the county in 28 first-class matches, the last of which came against Glamorgan in the County Championship. In his 28 first-class matches, he scored 384 runs at a batting average of 13.24, with a single half century high score of 53*, while in the field he took 14 catches. With the ball he took 93 wickets at a bowling average of 32.74. He took five wickets in an innings 7 times and 10 tens wickets in a match twice, with best innings bowling figures of 5/42.

It was for Nottinghamshire that he made his debut in List A cricket during the 1994 AXA Equity and Law League against Worcestershire. From 1994 to 1998, he represented the county in 26 List A matches, the last of which came against the touring South Africans. He later represented the Nottinghamshire Cricket Board in List A matches, making his debut for the Board against the Gloucestershire Cricket Board in the 2000 NatWest Trophy. From 2000 to 2002, he represented the Board in 4 List A matches, the last of which came against Cumberland in the 1st round of the 2003 Cheltenham & Gloucester Trophy which was played in 2002. In total, Hindson played 30 List A matches, during which he scored 174 runs at an average of 21.75, with a high score of 41*, while in the field he took 9 catches. With the ball he took 21 wickets at an average of 46.09, with best figures of 4/19.

He currently plays club cricket for Kimberley Institute Cricket Club in the Nottinghamshire Cricket Board Premier League.
