= Jacques Kallis =

South African cricketer (born 1975)

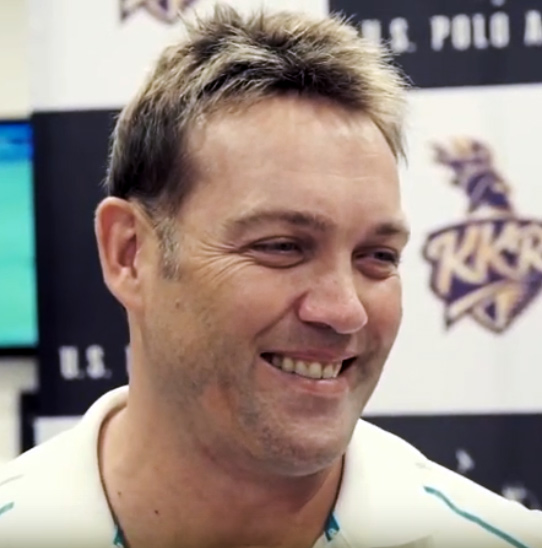
- Kallis in 2015

Personal information
- Full name: Jacques Henry Kallis
- Born: 16 October 1975 (age 51); Cape Town, Western Cape, South Africa
- Nickname: Jakes, Woogie, Kalahari
- Height: 1.83 m (6 ft 0 in)
- Batting: Right-handed
- Bowling: Right arm fast-medium
- Role: All-rounder

International information
- National side: South Africa (1995–2014)
- Test debut (cap 262): 14 December 1995 v England
- Last Test: 26 December 2013 v India
- ODI debut (cap 38): 9 January 1996 v England
- Last ODI: 12 July 2014 v Sri Lanka
- ODI shirt no.: 3
- T20I debut (cap 4): 21 October 2005 v New Zealand
- Last T20I: 2 October 2012 v India
- T20I shirt no.: 3

Domestic team information
- Years: Team
- 1993/94–2003/04: Western Province
- 1997: Middlesex
- 1999: Glamorgan
- 2006/07–2007/08: Cape Cobras
- 2008–2010: Royal Challengers Bangalore
- 2008/09–2010/11: Warriors
- 2011–2014: Kolkata Knight Riders
- 2011/12–2013/14: Cape Cobras
- 2014/15–2015/16: Sydney Thunder
- 2015: Trinidad and Tobago Red Steel

Career statistics
Competition	Test	ODI	FC	LA
Matches	166	329	257	424
Runs scored	13,289	11,579	19,695	14,845
Batting average	55.37	44.36	54.10	43.53
100s/50s	45/58	17/86	62/97	23/109
Top score	224	139	224	155*
Balls bowled	20,232	10,750	29,033	13,673
Wickets	292	273	427	351
Bowling average	32.65	31.79	31.69	30.68
5 wickets in innings	5	2	8	3
10 wickets in match	0	0	0	0
Best bowling	6/54	5/30	6/54	5/30
Catches/stumpings	200/–	131/–	264/–	162/–
Medal record
Men's Cricket
Representing South Africa
ICC Champions Trophy
Winner	1998 Bangladesh
Commonwealth Games
Gold medal – first place	1998 Kuala Lumpur
- Source: ESPNcricinfo, 14 February 2016

Jacques Henry Kallis OIS (born 16 October 1975) is a South African cricket coach and former professional cricketer. As a right-handed batsman and right-arm fast-medium swing bowler, he was voted as the greatest cricketer of the 21st Century by a panel of esteemed former cricketers. He is widely regarded as one of the greatest cricketers of all time and as one of the greatest all-rounders ever to play the game. As of 2026, Kallis is the only cricketer in the history of the game to score more than 10,000 runs and take over 250 wickets in both ODI and Test match cricket. He has also taken 131 ODI catches. He scored 13,289 runs in his Test match career, took 292 wickets, and 200 catches. Kallis scored 45 Test match centuries and is the fourth highest test match run scorer in history. Kallis won 23 Man-of-the-Match awards, the most by any player in Test history.

He was declared the Player of the Tournament in South Africa's victorious 1998 ICC KnockOut Trophy (now referred to as ICC Champions Trophy) campaign, which was South Africa's first ICC tournament win in their history. Kallis finished as the 2nd highest run-scorer in the tournament and was its leading wicket taker with Man-of-the-Match awards in both the semi-final and the final. In the 1998 ICC KnockOut Trophy Final, Kallis picked up a spell of 5 wickets for 30 runs.

Kallis played 166 Test matches and had a batting average of over 55 runs. From October to December 2007, he scored five centuries in four Test matches. With his century in the second innings of the third Test against India in January 2011, his 40th in all, he moved past Ricky Ponting to become the second-highest scorer of Test centuries, behind only Sachin Tendulkar's 51.

Kallis was named Leading Cricketer in the World in 2008 Wisden for his performances in 2007 in addition to being the "ICC Test Player of the Year" and ICC Player of the Year in 2005. He has been described by Kevin Pietersen, Ricky Ponting and Daryll Cullinan as the greatest cricketer to play the game, and along with Wally Hammond and Sir Garry Sobers is one of the few Test all-rounders whose Test batting average is over 50 and exceeds his Test bowling average by 20 or more. Kallis became the fourth player and first South African to score 13,000 Test runs on the opening day of the first Test against New Zealand on 2 January 2013. He was named one of the Wisden Cricketers of the Year in 2013. He retired from Test and first-class cricket after playing in the second test against India at Durban in December 2013; Kallis scored his 45th Test hundred in this match, making him one of the few batsmen to score a century in his final Test. He retired from all forms of international cricket on 30 July 2014.

In December 2019, it was announced that Jacques Kallis would rejoin the South African national cricket team, The Proteas, as the team's batting consultant for the duration of the summer. In August 2020, he was inducted to the ICC Cricket Hall of Fame.

== Playing career ==
=== Early career and 1996 Cricket World Cup ===
Kallis attended and played cricket for Wynberg Boys' High School. In 2009 Wynberg honoured Kallis by naming their main cricket oval after him. In July 1993 he was picked for South Africa U-17's against Scotland's U-19 team.

He made his first-class debut in 1993/94 as an 18-year-old, playing for Western Province B. Still 18, Kallis played league cricket in England for Old Edwardians in Solihull in 1994, where coaching staff saw the potential for him to become a first-class all-rounder; the following summer he played for Netherfield in Kendal, scoring 791 runs at an average of 98.87 from 14 matches.

His first Test appearance was on 14–18 December 1995 against England in Durban, but he struggled with the bat in his first few matches. Kallis made his World Cup debut in 1996 in Pakistan but did not have much opportunity to excel. His breakthrough came in 1997, with 61 against Pakistan, and then two matches later, he salvaged a draw for South Africa with a fighting century against Australia at the Melbourne Cricket Ground.

=== 1998–2002 ===
Between 1998 and 2002, Jacques Kallis was one of the world's leading all-rounders, as seen in the ICC's cricket ratings. In 1998, he led South Africa to the ICC Champions Trophy title with two "Man of the Match" and the "Player of the Series" performances. The youngster was solid, without being spectacular, in the 1999 ICC Cricket World Cup, before a "Player of the Series" performance led South Africa to a stunning Test series victory against India in India in 2000. By late 2001 he was the world's number one ranked Test all-rounder, having held the same ranking in ODIs for the best part of 3 years. During this time, "Kallis blossomed into arguably the world's leading batsman, with a defensive technique second to none, and the adhesive qualities of a Cape Point limpet. Generally a placid and undemonstrative man, he nailed down the crucial No. 3 positions in the South African batting order after several players had been tried and discarded, and his stock rose exponentially from that moment."

=== 2003–2014 ===
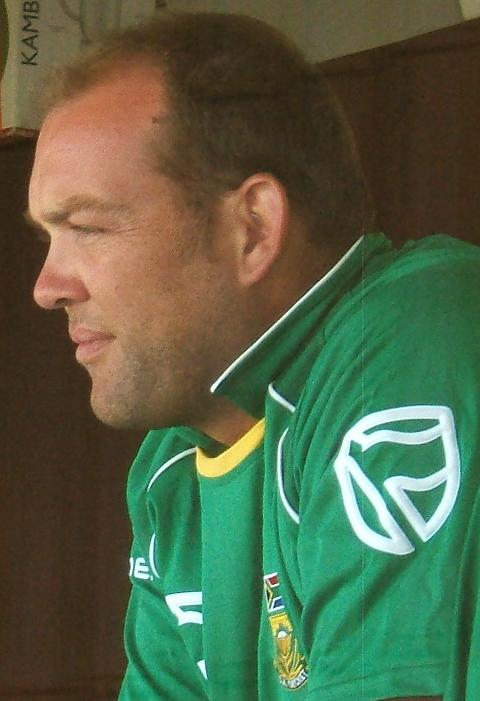
Kallis in 2009

Kallis is one of only four players in Test history (after Sir Donald Bradman and before Mohammad Yousuf and Gautam Gambhir) to make a century in five consecutive matches, which he achieved in the 2003/04 season. For his performances in 2004, 2005, and 2008, he was named in the World Test XI by ICC. He was also named in the World ODI XI by the ICC for the year 2004 and 12th man for XI in 2005. He was also selected for the ODI XI in 2007 as well. In 2005, he set the record for the fastest half-century in Test cricket history, scoring 50 against Zimbabwe off only 24 balls. In 2007, Kallis scored five centuries in four Tests, making him just the fourth man after Bradman, Ken Barrington and Matthew Hayden to score four centuries in four Tests on two different occasions. Kallis has a remarkable batting average in the mid-50s, and was consistently rated as one of the best batsmen in the world. Although a very capable bowler with 292 Test wickets, he impressed mostly with the bat between 2005 and 2007. As a result, he evolved into more of a batting all-rounder, a role in which he continued because of the emergence of Dale Steyn, Morné Morkel, and Vernon Philander. Kallis is the only man to score over 10,000 runs and to take over 200 wickets in Test cricket. Sir Garfield Sobers managed over 8,000 runs and 200 wickets by comparison, at very similar averages, although Sobers achieved this feat in just 93 tests compared to Kallis’ 166.

In 2005, Kallis was selected for the World XI team to play an Asian XI in a benefit match for those affected by the tsunami of 2004, along with countryman Shaun Pollock. In the same year, he was awarded the Sir Garfield Sobers Trophy for the ICC player of the year. The award was shared with Andrew Flintoff of England, his only serious competitor as the world's leading all-rounder, after the votes of the academy were tied. Kallis also won the "ICC Test Player of the Year" award that year.

In 2006, Kallis was awarded the captaincy of South Africa for the third and final Test match against Australia when Graeme Smith withdrew with an injury.

In the 2007 World Cup, Kallis was South Africa's leading run-scorer with 485 runs at 80.83. He was, however, criticized in the press for scoring slowly, which cost South Africa momentum at key stages in the tournament. In August 2007, he was omitted from the 15-man South Africa squad for 2007 ICC World Twenty20, and consequently resigned as vice-captain. He was restored to the team for the Test series against Pakistan, where he scored three centuries in four innings and was awarded "Man of the Match" twice and "Player of the Series".

Following his successful tour of Pakistan, Kallis scored two aggressive centuries in matches against New Zealand at Johannesburg's Wanderer's Stadium and Centurion Park in Pretoria, taking his total century count to five in four matches. Following this purple patch of form, Kallis endured three tours without success in the form of hundreds, although the Proteas secured historic series victories in England and Australia, and won a two-match series against Bangladesh at home.

Kallis returned to form after an indifferent 2008 and averaged over 50 in his next six series. During this time, the Proteas won one series (against West Indies), drew four (two against India, one against England, and one against Pakistan in the United Arab Emirates), and lost one series to a resilient Australia. Kallis scored 173 in Nagpur in 2010. In the Centurion Test against India later in the year, he scored his maiden double-century in Test match cricket. His 201 not out came in a landslide victory for South Africa, as two of the team's future batting stars contributed significant hundreds of their own (AB de Villiers and future captain Hashim Amla). For the second time in his career, Kallis scored twin centuries in a match, during the third Test of the series at his home ground, Newlands in Cape Town.

In January 2012, Kallis scored his highest score in Tests – 224 against Sri Lanka at Newlands. The last eight series that Kallis played in for South Africa were all victories for the Proteas, except for one series draw against Pakistan in the UAE. Kallis became one of the few players in world cricket to have won two series each in England and Australia. The Proteas also won two series against New Zealand and one against each of India, Pakistan, Sri Lanka, England, and Australia.

Throughout this period of his career, Kallis was still valued for his bowling. He contributed valuable economical overs and had a knack for taking important wickets.

In September 2014, Kallis signed a one-year contract with the Sydney Thunder in the Big Bash League. In his first appearance for the Thunder he scored an important innings of 97* and picked up a wicket.

=== 2008–2013: The senior all-rounder ===
In 2008 more responsibility was placed on Kallis as an all-rounder due to the retirement of Shaun Pollock. Despite the pressure, an all-rounder began to emerge in Wayne Parnell who did some good lower-order batting. Kallis endured an uncharacteristically poor 2008 with the bat, averaging well under thirty for much of it. Against the ninth-ranked Bangladesh, he averaged just 25.75 in four Test outings. He also played for Royal Challengers Bangalore in the Indian Premier League, where he averaged 16.85 runs per innings with the bat and 55.5 runs per wicket with the ball at an economy rate of 9.65 in the 7 matches he played before he was dropped.

==== Home and away series against Australia (2008–09) ====
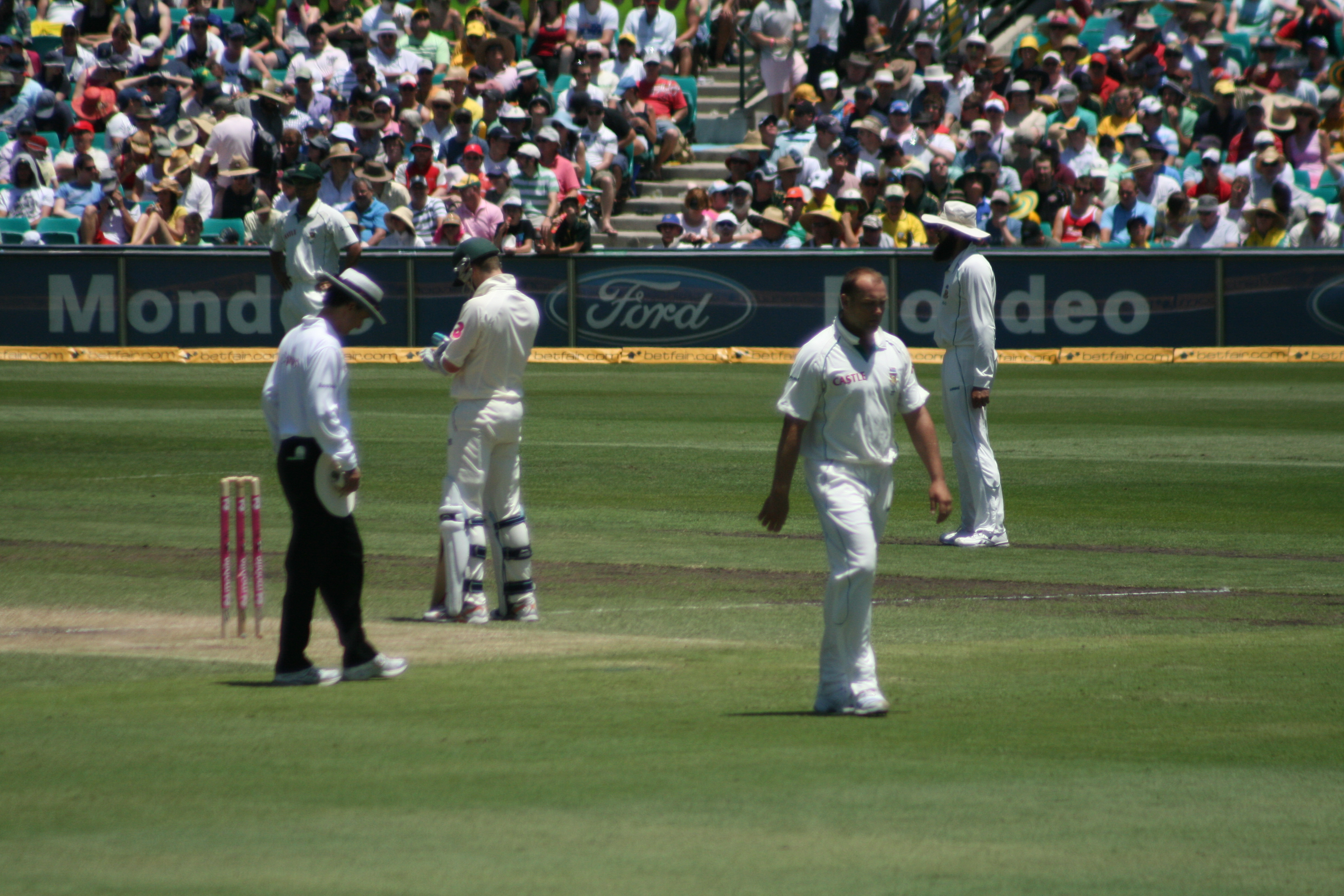
Kallis bowling against Australia on the second day of the test, at the SCG

South Africa toured Australia for a three-match Test series and five-match ODI series starting in December 2008. The tourists had a successful 9–2 Test win–loss ratio in 2008; however, Australia had just come off a 2–0 away series defeat against India and had a 5–3 ratio for the calendar year. Before the series, Kallis had a batting average of 38.32 in 18 Tests against the number one ranked team, substantially lower than his overall average of 55.06. Despite an average of 124.50 in 12 Tests against lowly ranked Zimbabwe and Bangladesh, former Australia fast-bowler Rodney Hogg labeled the all-rounder "a flat-track bully, who dishes it out to the minnows like Bangladesh and Zimbabwe but goes missing against the Australians." In the first Test starting on 17 December, Kallis scored 63 in South Africa's first innings, before he was dismissed by Mitchell Johnson, in the midst of a bowling spell consisting of 5/2 in 20 balls. After failing to make a breakthrough in Australia's first innings, Kallis took 3/24 in their second, while completing four catches in the match. He then scored 57, while being involved in a 124-run partnership with AB de Villiers, as South Africa chased down 414, the second-highest fourth-innings run-chase in Test history. In the second Test in Melbourne starting on Boxing Day, Kallis struggled to be potent in Australia's first innings, taking 1/55. While making a start in his team's first dig, he managed only 26, before taking 2/57 when the home-side batted again. Chasing just 183, Kallis was not required to bat, as South Africa completed their first Test series victory in Australia. In Australia's 103 run Third Test victory in Sydney, Kallis struggled, taking 1/54 and 0/13 with the ball, while scoring 37 and four with the bat.

The win was South Africa's 11th in a year in which they drew with India in India, defeated England in England, Australia in Australia, and also recorded series wins over West Indies and Bangladesh. Kallis was featured in all of those matches and remains an integral part of the champion team's set-up.

For his performances in 2010, 2011 and 2012, he was named in the World Test XI by the ICC.

On 10 April 2013 he was named one of the Wisden Cricketers of the Year for 2013.

=== Injuries, continued achievement and records ===
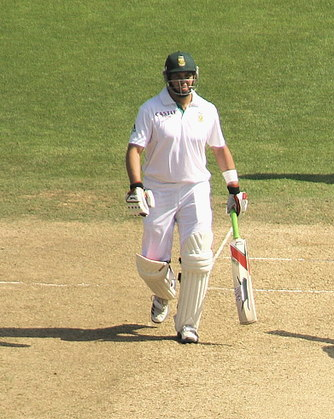
Kallis batting at The Oval in July 2012

Kallis participated in the tour of the West Indies, in which he scored his 35th test cricket century. Kallis injured his neck during the 2010 Champions League Twenty20 playing for the Royal Challengers Bangalore and missed the Twenty20 and ODI series against Zimbabwe. He returned for the ODI series against Pakistan, scoring 66 before having to retire hurt with a cramp. He did, however, manage to lay the foundations for an eight-wicket victory.

For his performances in 2010 and 2012, he was named in the ESPNcricinfo IPL XI

In the same ODI Jacques Kallis scored his 129th ODI six, a record for a South African in the format. However, he picked up an injury and was a doubtful starter for the second ODI. In December 2010, on the 3rd day of the first test against India, Kallis scored his maiden double century, scoring 201* (not out). Kallis was selected by South Africa for the 2011 ICC Cricket World Cup.

In the 2011–12 season, Kallis scored his second double century in Test cricket, reaching 224 in South Africa's first innings of the third Test of the home series against Sri Lanka. The Test was Kallis's 150th; he became the sixth player in history and the first South African to reach this milestone. After the series, former Indian captain Sourav Ganguly said that he considered Kallis to be the "most-effective player" in Test cricket. Brett Lee named Kallis as the best player in the world in an interview after their victory for Kolkata Knight Riders for his performance in IPL 2012 final against Chennai Super Kings.

He played a crucial role in the qualification of the Royal Challengers Bangalore for the Champions League T20 during IPL-3 and later on played a crucial role in the triumph of Kolkata Knight Riders in IPL-5, scoring a total of 407 runs and taking 15 wickets.

In August 2023, at the age of 47, Kallis played in the California Knights’ opening match in the US Masters T10. He scored an unbeaten 64 off 31 balls.

== Coaching career ==
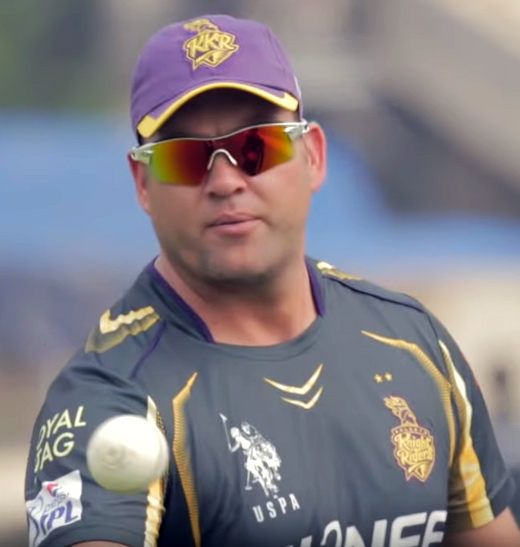
Kallis during IPL, 2015

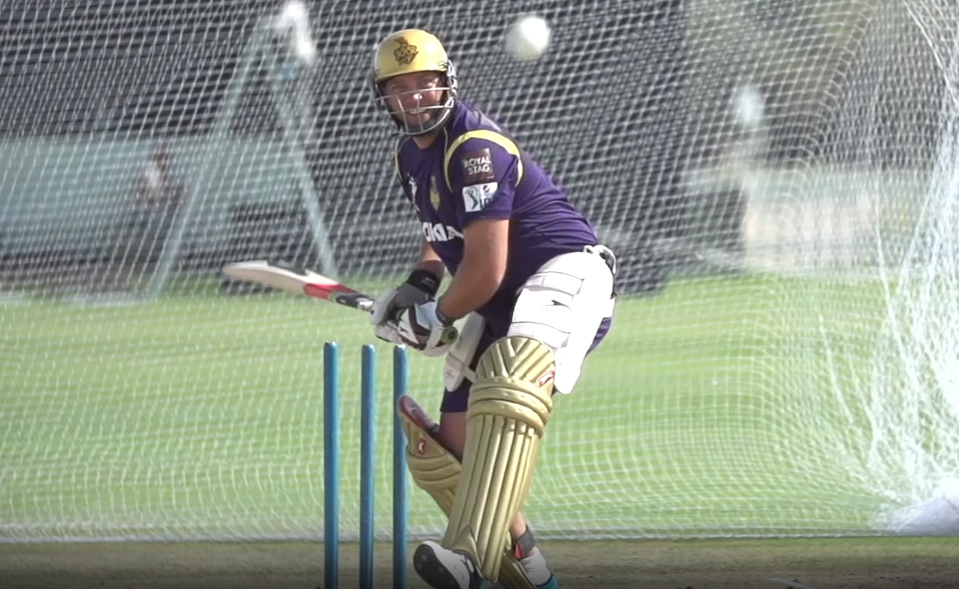
Kallis batting in nets during IPL, 2015

Kallis was appointed head coach of Kolkata Knight Riders in October 2015 when head coach Trevor Bayliss resigned to take over as head coach of England cricket team in June 2015. Kallis was also batting consultant of KKR for 2015 Indian Premier League season.

In December 2019, Kallis was appointed as batting consultant for South Africa national cricket team. As of late 2020 he is a batting consultant for the England national cricket team.

== Playing style and comparisons ==
Kallis has earned high praise for his orthodox batting technique. In an article for the Telegraph in July 2012, former England batsman and captain Michael Vaughan wrote that Kallis, "as a batsman, is the best player in the world.". He described Kallis's batting in more detail:

Whether on the front or back foot, he plays well on the on- and off-side. He’s not Brian Lara or Ricky Ponting in terms of aggression or flair but he is rock solid and, added to that, has every shot in the book. Also, his cover drive and flick off the hip are right up there in terms of execution and attractiveness. ... He can score quickly at times but it is his way of being able to read situations that sets him apart. ... He knows when to grind it out or move up through the gears. Some people think he could move through the gears quicker when batting, and that is probably a fair argument on occasions, but the majority of the time he knows what he can do at the crease and believes South Africa has a better chance of winning if he stays there.

Given his impressive all-around record, Kallis has also been compared with Sir Garfield Sobers. In November 2012, noted journalist Gideon Haigh wrote in The Australian that statistically, they were almost inseparable; Sobers scored 8032 at an average of 58 and took 235 wickets at an average of 34, while Kallis at the time of writing averaged 57 with the bat and 33 with the ball. Haigh also analysed how Kallis and Sobers were also polar opposites in certain ways:

Sobers [was] all prowling grace and feline elasticity, with his 360-degree batswing and three-in-one bowling; [whereas] Kallis [is] all looming bulk and latent power, constructed like a work of neo-brutalist architecture. ... Yet what they are just as many opposites of are their respective eras. Sobers was the most explosive cricketer of a more staid age, the more mercurial because of the orthodoxy and rigidity around him; Kallis is the most stoic and remorseless cricketer of an era more ostentatious and histrionic. ... Sobers was a cavalier among roundheads; Kallis has steadily become a roundhead among cavaliers.

== Personal life ==
Kallis shared a close relationship with his father, Henry, whom Kallis cited as his primary influence. His sister Janine Kallis, five years his junior, was a cheerleader in Indian Premier League 2009 and is also a physiotherapist based in East London. When it was discovered that his father had terminal cancer, Kallis took time out of cricket to be with his father:

We heard something was wrong with my dad during the [2003] World Cup. He started feeling unwell and then, out of the blue, we were told he only had a few months to live. It was a huge shock because we've always been a very close family. I missed the first couple of Tests in England that year so I could be at home with him. It was obviously the saddest time of my life but those last weeks were maybe some of the most beautiful. It gave me a chance to say thank you and goodbye. After a while, I realized how lucky I was to do that. It's far harder if a parent is taken away before you have that time together. So his death put cricket in perspective for me. It's just a game – and a very simple game if you keep your mind straight.

In January 2019, Kallis married Charlene Engels. The couple has a son, born on 11 March 2020.

== Jacques Kallis Scholarship Foundation ==
The Jacques Kallis Scholarship Foundation was established in Kallis's benefit year to combine the academic and life skills programs of existing school structures with funding and mentoring support from Jacques Kallis. The Foundation with its partners hopes to provide talented youngsters the opportunity to reach their full sporting and academic potential.

Currently, the Foundation sponsors 2 boys from Wynberg Boys', 2 boys from Pretoria Boys High School, 2 from Maritzburg College, and 2 from Selborne College. Jacques Kallis participates in annual fundraising events for his Foundation, to which he invites fellow South African celebrities and cricketers like Mark Boucher and André Nel.

== Achievements and records ==
Jacques Kallis has achieved the following career-best rankings in the cricket ratings as determined by the International Cricket Council 3:

- Test Batting: career-best 1st; career-high points 935
- Test Bowling: career-best 6th; career-high points 742
- Test All-rounders: career-best 1st; career-high points 616
- ODI Batting: career-best 1st; career-high points 817
- ODI Bowling: career-best 15th; career-high points 641
- ODI All-rounders: career-best 1st; career-high points 506
- 1st & only player in cricket history to achieve the mark of 10,000 runs in Tests & ODI each and more than 200 wickets in the Tests and ODIs each
- He was also the first bowler to take a fifer in ICC Champions Trophy history.
- He was also the only bowler to take a 5 wicket haul in the finals of the ICC Champions Trophy (in the 1998 ICC KnockOut Trophy tournament)
- Kallis was also the first player to bag the Player of the final, as well as the Player of the Tournament awards in ICC Champions Trophy.
- He along with Graeme Smith set the record for the highest ever partnership for any wicket as debutants in T20 Internationals (84 for the 1st wicket)
- He holds the record for a most man of the matches in Test Cricket – 23.
- ICC Men's Test Team of the Year: 2004, 2005, 2008, 2010, 2011
- ICC Men's ODI Team of the Year: 2004, 2005, 2007
- ICC Men's Test Cricketer of the Year: 2005
- ICC Men's Cricketer of the Year: 2005
- Cricket South Africa Player of the Year: 2011
- Cricket South Africa Test Player of the Year: 2011
- Big Bash Player of the Series: 2014-15, the first and only overseas player to win the award.

Preceded by Rahul Dravid	Sir Garfield Sobers Trophy; 2005 (joint with Andrew Flintoff)	Succeeded by Ricky Ponting
