= Stephen Randall =

English cricketer

Personal information
- Full name: Stephen John Randall
- Born: 9 June 1980 (age 46); Nottingham, Nottinghamshire, England
- Batting: Right-handed
- Bowling: Right-arm off break

Domestic team information
- Years: Team
- 1999–2003: Nottinghamshire
- 1999: Nottinghamshire Cricket Board

Career statistics
Competition	FC	LA
Matches	10	21
Runs scored	116	122
Batting average	8.92	15.25
100s/50s	–/–	–/–
Top score	28	25
Balls bowled	1,585	942
Wickets	8	15
Bowling average	118.87	52.06
5 wickets in innings	–	–
10 wickets in match	–	–
Best bowling	2/64	3/44
Catches/stumpings	5/–	7/–
- Source: Cricinfo, 29 September 2010

Stephen John Randall (born 9 June 1980) is a former English cricketer. Randall is a right-handed batsman who bowls right-arm off break. He was born in Nottingham, Nottinghamshire.

Randall made his debut in List-A cricket for the Nottinghamshire Cricket Board against Scotland in the 1999 NatWest Trophy.

Randall made his first-class debut for Nottinghamshire against Middlesex in the 1999 County Championship. From 1999 to 2002, he represented the county in 10 first-class matches, the last of which came against Glamorgan. In his 10 first-class matches, he scored 116 runs at a batting average of 8.92, with a high score of 28. With the ball he took 8 wickets at a bowling average of 118.87, with best figures of 2/64.

His List-A debut for Nottinghamshire came against Gloucestershire in 2001. From 2001 to 2003, he represented the county in 20 List-A matches, the last of which came against Middlesex. In his 20 List-A matches for the county he scored 121 runs, at an average of 17.28, with a high score of 25. With the ball he took 15 wickets at an average of 49.20, with best figures of 3/44.

In local domestic cricket, he currently plays for Caythorpe Cricket Club in the Nottinghamshire Cricket Board Premier League.
