= Faf du Plessis =

South African cricketer (born 1984)

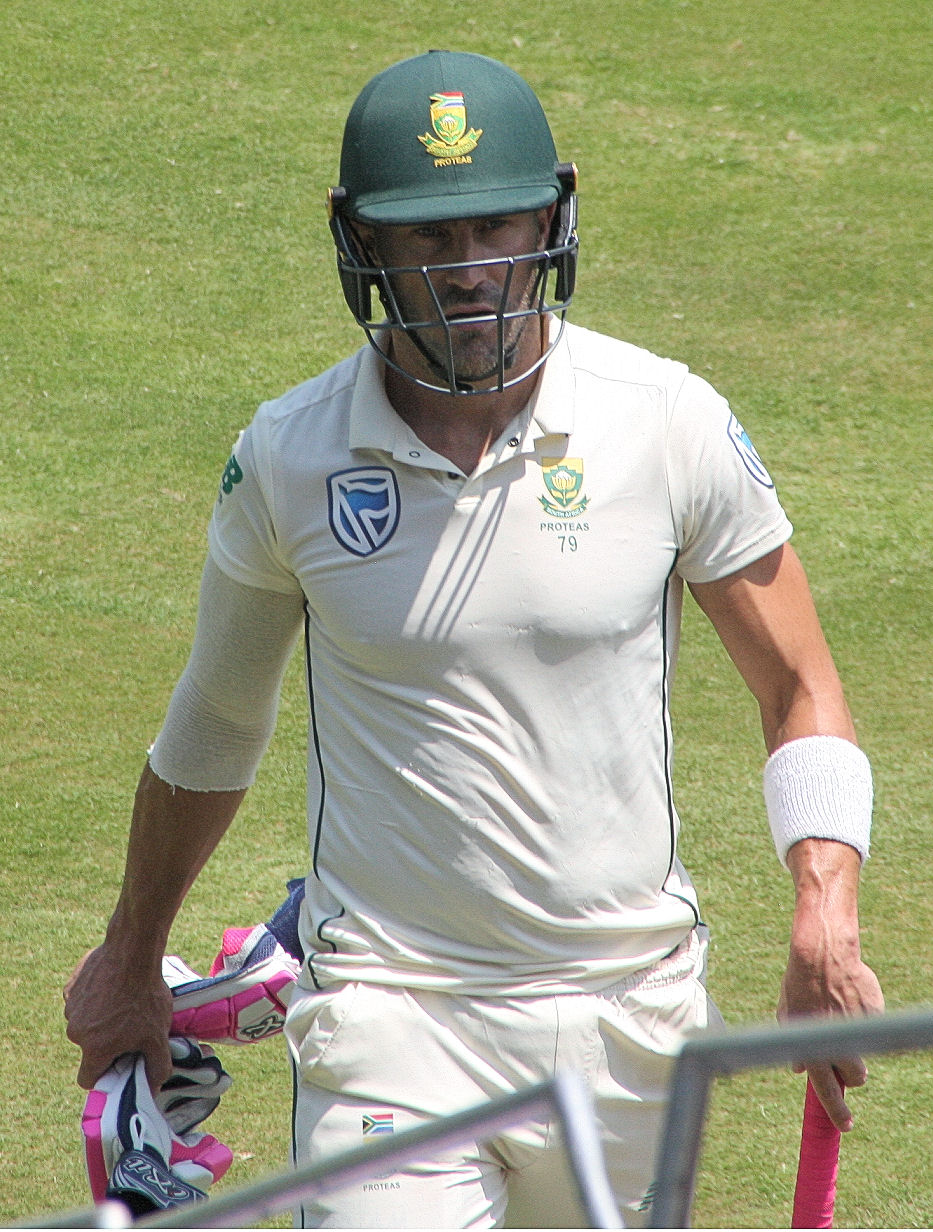
- du Plessis in 2019

Personal information
- Full name: François du Plessis
- Born: 13 July 1984 (age 42); Pretoria, South Africa
- Height: 5 ft 11 in (1.80 m)
- Batting: Right-handed
- Bowling: Right-arm leg-break
- Role: Top-order batter

International information
- National side: South Africa (2011–2021)
- Test debut (cap 314): 23 November 2012 v Australia
- Last Test: 4 February 2021 v Pakistan
- ODI debut (cap 101): 18 January 2011 v India
- Last ODI: 6 July 2019 v Australia
- ODI shirt no.: 18
- T20I debut (cap 52): 8 September 2012 v England
- Last T20I: 1 December 2020 v England
- T20I shirt no.: 18

Domestic team information
- Years: Team
- 2003/04–2011/12 (Note: Only teams that du Plessis has played for in more than one seasons are included in this list.): Northerns
- 2008–2009: Lancashire
- 2005/06–2019/20: Titans
- 2011–2015, 2018–2021: Chennai Super Kings
- 2016–2017: Rising Pune Supergiant
- 2018–2019: Paarl Rocks
- 2022–2024: Royal Challengers Bangalore
- 2023–2025: Texas Super Kings
- 2023–2026: Joburg Super Kings
- 2026: Rotterdam Dockers

Career statistics
Competition	Test	ODI	T20I	FC
Matches	69	143	50	150
Runs scored	4,163	5,507	1,528	8,798
Batting average	40.02	47.47	35.53	39.27
100s/50s	10/21	12/35	1/10	18/52
Top score	199	185	119	199
Balls bowled	78	192	8	2,558
Wickets	0	2	0	41
Bowling average	–	94.50	–	36.02
5 wickets in innings	–	0	–	0
10 wickets in match	–	0	–	0
Best bowling	–	1/8	–	4/39
Catches/stumpings	63/–	81/–	24/–	141/–
- Source: ESPNcricinfo, 7 March 2025

François "Faf" du Plessis (/ˈduːplɛsi/ DOO-pless-ee; born 13 July 1984) is a South African cricketer and former captain of the South Africa national cricket team. He is considered one of the greatest fielders of all time and among the best all-format batsmen of his era. One of the most successful international captains of his era with a winning percentage of 73.68 in ODIs, he is the first international captain to defeat Australia in Australia in all three formats of the game and defeat Australia in both Home and Away test series back to back, in 2016 and 2018. In 2016, he also became the first and only international captain to whitewash Australia defeating them 5–0 in a five match ODI series. Du Plessis was a major part in the success of Chennai Super Kings, helping them win two IPL titles and a Champions League title.

== Domestic and franchise career ==
du Plessis was given a six-month contract with Lancashire County Cricket Club for the 2008 season as a Kolpak player after impressing the board with good performances in the local Nottinghamshire leagues for Mansfield Hosiery Mills and in the Lancashire League for Todmorden. Following his initial stint with the club, du Plessis signed a new three-year deal. Lancashire coach Mike Watkinson praised du Plessis' fielding, saying "if there's a better fielder in county cricket I've not seen him this season". In March 2010, it was announced that du Plessis would no longer be allowed to play for Lancashire as a Kolpak player after changes to the Kolpak rules. In 2011, he was signed by Chennai Super Kings to play in the Indian Premier League.

Along with Jonathan Vandiar, Dean Elgar, and Ethi Mbhalati, du Plessis was one of four uncapped players to be named in South Africa's 30-man preliminary squad for the 2011 World Cup. He was named one of the five South Africa Cricket Annual's Players Of The Year in 2011. Du Plessis made his international debut against India in January 2011 in a One Day International, scoring an unbeaten 60 runs, and went on to make his Test match debut in November 2012, becoming the fourth South African to score a Test century on debut. ESPNcricinfo rated his innings as one of the greatest rearguard innings in modern cricket.

Du Plessis took over the Test captaincy in December 2016 and assumed full-time captaincy in all formats of the game in August 2017 after teammate and former captain AB de Villiers relinquished the two limited overs captaincies. In February 2021 he announced his retirement from Test cricket in order to focus on the 2021 and 2022 ICC Men's T20 World Cups.

In October 2018, he was named in Paarl Rocks' squad for the first edition of the Mzansi Super League T20 tournament. He was the leading run-scorer for the team in the tournament, with 318 runs in nine matches.

In June 2019, he was selected to play for the Edmonton Royals franchise team in the 2019 Global T20 Canada tournament. In September 2019, he was named in the squad for the Paarl Rocks team for the 2019 Mzansi Super League tournament, and led the team to their first title. In October 2020, he was drafted by the Colombo Kings for the inaugural edition of the Lanka Premier League. In the same month, he was picked by Peshawar Zalmi to feature in the delayed playoffs of the fifth season of the Pakistan Super League as a replacement for Kieron Pollard. He appeared only in one match as Zalmi were eliminated from the tournament in the first eliminator.

In February 2021, he was signed by the Quetta Gladiators for the 2021 Pakistan Super League but, in June 2021, he was ruled out of the rest of the tournament due a concussion sustained during a match after colliding with teammate Mohammad Hasnain. He captained the Saint Lucia Kings in the 2021 Caribbean Premier League, and the Bangla Tigers in the 2021 T10 League. In November 2021, he was selected to play for the Jaffna Kings following the players' draft for the 2021 Lanka Premier League.

In the 2022 Indian Premier League auction, du Plessis was bought by Royal Challengers Bangalore; and named as team's captain on 12 March 2022. In April 2022, he was bought by the Northern Superchargers for the 2022 season of The Hundred in England. In November 2022, the Perth Scorchers drafted him for the first half of the 2022–23 Big Bash League season as a replacement for Laurie Evans.

In 2023, Johannesburg Super Kings announced du Plessis as the captain of the inaugural SA20 league. In June 2023, Texas Super Kings announced du Plessis as the captain for the inaugural season of the Twenty20 league Major League Cricket (MLC). In October 2024, du Plessis led Saint Lucia Kings to win the Caribbean Premier League 2024. In November 2025, he signed to play for Biratnagar Kings in the Nepal Premier League.

In November 2025, du Plessis announced his retirement from Indian Premier League on his social media handles after playing for Delhi Capitals in his final season in the IPL. He has withdrawn from IPL 2026 auctions to join Pakistan Super League

As of 2026, du Plessis holds the record for the most hundreds in Major League Cricket (MLC) history, and is the second highest run-scorer accumulating 1,226 runs.

== International career ==
=== Early days ===
du Plessis made his ODI debut on 18 January 2011 against India and made unbeaten 60 runs. He was chosen ahead of Albie Morkel for the 2011 World Cup on the Indian Sub-continent and later made his Test debut for South Africa against Australia at the Adelaide Oval in 2012 as the number 6 batsman, replacing the injured JP Duminy.

He scored 188 runs in the match and was selected as Man-of-the-match for his resilient performance that ultimately led to the match being drawn and the series being square before the third and final Test in which he scored 78 runs the 1st innings and the last man to be dismissed, taking the South African score to 388 in reply to Australia's 550. In the 2nd innings, he scored a match-saving 110 not out from 376 balls over 466 minutes.

In the next test at WACA Ground, he scored a resilient unbeaten 78 from 142 balls to take his team's score to 225 in the 1st innings, from 75/6 with able support from Robin Peterson (31 off 45), Vernon Philander (30 from 54) and last man Morne Morkel (17 from 15). South Africa won the 3-match Test Series against Australia 1–0. In December 2012, he was named captain of the South African T20 team for three matches against New Zealand.

After making his T20 debut in September 2012, he was subsequently also named T20 captain of South Africa for the following Twenty20 series against New Zealand and confirmed full-time skipper in February 2013.

In October 2013, he was fined 50% of his match fee after being found guilty of ball tampering in a Test match against Pakistan. In December 2013, he scored a test match saving hundred with a score of 134 off 309 balls against India while chasing 458 to win in the 4th innings. The match ended in a draw with South Africa on 450/7, only 8 runs short from what would have been the highest successful run chase in test match history. du Plessis made his maiden ODI hundred on 27 August 2014 against Australia after scoring 106 off 98 balls while chasing 327 runs to win. His partnership of 206 runs with AB de Villiers for the 3rd wicket is the highest for South Africa against Australia.

He was also named in the T20I XI of 2013 by ESPNcricinfo for his performances in the year.

His second Hundred came only 6 days later in his next ODI match on 2 September 2014. He scored 126 from 109 balls against the same opposition although South Africa lost by 62 runs. After making his maiden ODI hundred on 27 August 2014, and a consecutive ODI hundred on 2 September 2014, du Plessis followed with a third consecutive ODI hundred, scoring 121 off 140 balls, this time against Zimbabwe on 4 September 2014. (South Africa were playing an ODI tri-series with Australia and Zimbabwe.)

On 6 September 2014 against Australia, du Plessis fell only four runs short of becoming the first batsman in history to score 4 ODI hundreds in a row. (this would also have been a record for the most ODI hundreds by a batsman in any ICC ODI tournament) He initially looked on course to achieve his 4th ODI hundred until his batting partner AB de Villiers hit 2 sixes and a four in quick succession, which meant du Plessis had to obtain all the remaining runs in the game single-handedly if he was to reach this milestone. Needing only 1 run to win the game with plenty of wickets and balls in hand, du Plessis was on 96 and therefore had to hit a boundary (barring any extras) in order to reach 4 ODI hundreds in a row, but while attempting to hit a boundary he was caught off the bowling of Australia's spear-head Mitchell Johnson. South Africa still went on to win the ODI match against Australia comfortably by 6 wickets. This victory also secured South Africa as the winners of the ODI tri-series, and du Plessis subsequently became Man of the Series.

On 17 December 2014, du Plessis set the record for playing the most number of international cricket innings before scoring a duck (108) and also became the only batsman to play in over 100 international innings before first ever duck. On 27 December 2014, du Plessis scored his second first innings century at the same ground: St. George's Oval. On 11 January 2015, du Plessis scored 119 in 56 balls against West Indies, becoming the first South African to score centuries in all forms of the game.

=== Record breaking year ===
For the 2016–17 Australian tour of South Africa to play five ODIs, du Plessis was named captain after original skipper AB de Villiers was ruled out due to a surgery. On 2 October, du Plessis scored his sixth century in the second game and became the second cricketer to score centuries in all international formats as captain, after Sri Lanka's Tillakaratne Dilshan. During that same match at Johannesburg, du Plessis become the first batsman to score centuries in all three formats of cricket at a single venue. and is the first South African to score a century in all international formats of the game.

du Plessis is the first player to score a century in an innings of a day/night Test as captain. In the same game he set the record for declaration of the lowest ever total ever as an unbeaten captain, where he remained unbeaten on 118 in South Africa's first innings score of 259/9 dec.

On 12 December 2016, with AB de Villiers stepping down as Test Captain, du Plessis also inherited the role.

On 7 February 2017, du Plessis scored 185 runs in the fourth ODI against Sri Lanka, the second highest individual score by a South African, just three runs short of Gary Kirsten's 188*.

=== Captaincy and beyond ===
du Plessis is noted for his leadership and strategical excellence, but he is also known for emphasizing team culture, relationships and listening to his players. His captaincy record was hampered by the transitional team and racial quotas based team selections but still fared well. On 24 August 2017, du Plessis was named as the captain in all three formats when de Villiers stepped down from ODI captaincy. On the same day, he was named as the captain of World XI team for the three T20Is in Lahore, Pakistan. Pakistan won the series 2–1. Following the conclusion of the series, Faf du Plessis said how much it meant for the people of Pakistan and that it hopefully will bring cricket back to the country.

In March 2019, in the second ODI against Sri Lanka, du Plessis scored his 5,000th run in ODI cricket. The following month, he was named as the captain of South Africa's squad for the 2019 Cricket World Cup. He finished the tournament as the leading run-scorer for South Africa, with 387 runs in nine matches.

In August 2019, he was named the Men's Cricketer of the Year at Cricket South Africa's annual award ceremony. In December 2020, in the first Test against Sri Lanka, du Plessis scored his 4,000th run and his tenth century in Test cricket. He ended with 199, becoming the 13th player to be dismissed on 199 in Tests, and also won the man of the match award.

In 2020, Du Plessis's test performance in the 2012 Adelaide test was judged by cricket.com.au as the best test batting performance by any batsman on Australian soil since the year 2000. On 17 February 2021, du Plessis announced his retirement from Tests after leading South Africa in 36 Test matches.

=== International centuries ===
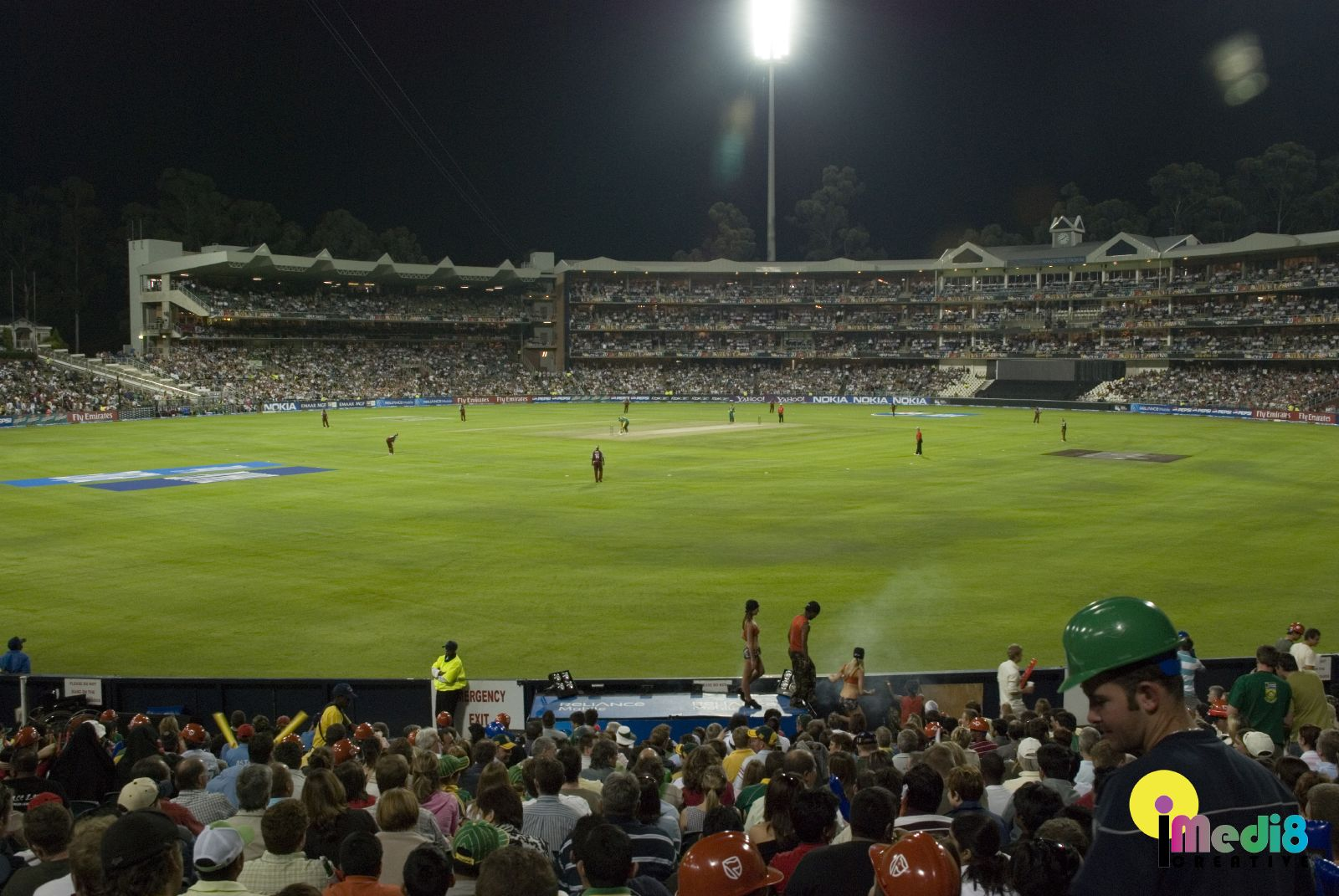
Wanderers Stadium, where du Plessis has scored centuries in all three formats of the game.

du Plessis has scored ten Test match centuries, 12 ODI centuries, and a single century in a T20I. He scored his first century in November 2012 against Australia on his Test debut, making an unbeaten 110 runs. His highest Test score came in December 2020 against Sri Lanka when he scored 199 at Centurion.

It was over three years later in his 51st ODI that he made his first ODI century, scoring 106 against Australia in Harare. His highest ODI score of 185 runs came on in 2017 against Sri Lanka in Cape Town. During the course of the innings, he made the second highest ODI score by a South African.

He scored his only T20I century against West Indies in January 2015, becoming the first South African to score centuries in all three formats of the game.

Test centuries
No.	Score	Against	Pos.	Inn.	Test	Venue	H/A	Date	Result	Ref
1	110 not out	Australia	6	4	2/3	Adelaide Oval, Adelaide	Away	22 November 2012	Drawn	
2	137	New Zealand	6	1	2/2	St George's Park Cricket Ground, Port Elizabeth	Home	11 January 2013	Won	
3	134	India	4	4	1/2	Wanderers Stadium, Johannesburg	Home	18 December 2013	Drawn	
4	103	West Indies	3	1	2/3	St George's Park Cricket Ground, Port Elizabeth	Home	26 December 2014	Drawn	
5	112 not out	New Zealand	5	1	2/2	SuperSport Park, Centurion	Home	27 August 2016	Won	
6	118 not out	Australia	5	1	3/3	Adelaide Oval, Adelaide	Away	24 November 2016	Lost	
7	135*	Bangladesh	5	1	2/2	Mangaung Oval, Bloemfontein	Home	6 October 2017	Won	
8	120	Australia	5	3	4/4	Wanderers Stadium, Johannesburg	Home	30 March 2018	Won	
9	103	Pakistan	5	2	2/3	Newlands Cricket Ground, Cape Town	Home	3 January 2019	Won	
10	199	Sri Lanka	4	2	1/2	SuperSport Park, Centurion	Home	26 December 2020	Won	

ODI centuries
No.	Score	Against	Pos.	Inn.	S/R	Venue	H/A/N	Date	Result	Ref
1	106	Australia	3	2	108.16	Harare Sports Club, Harare	Neutral	27 August 2014	Won	
2	126	Australia	3	2	115.59	Harare Sports Club, Harare	Neutral	2 September 2014	Lost	
3	121	Zimbabwe	3	1	86.42	Harare Sports Club, Harare	Away	4 September 2014	Won	
4	109	Ireland	3	1	100.00	Manuka Oval, Canberra	Neutral	3 March 2015	Won	
5	133 not out	India	3	1	115.65	Wankhede Stadium, Mumbai	Away	25 October 2015	Won	
6	111	Australia	3	1	119.35	Wanderers Stadium, Johannesburg	Home	2 October 2016	Won	
7	105	Sri Lanka	3	1	87.50	Kingsmead Cricket Ground, Durban	Home	1 February 2017	Won	
8	185	Sri Lanka	3	1	131.20	Newlands Cricket Ground, Cape Town	Home	7 February 2017	Won	
9	120	India	3	1	107.14	Kingsmead Cricket Ground, Durban	Home	1 February 2018	Lost	
10	125	Australia	4	1	109.64	Bellerive Oval, Hobart	Away	11 November 2018	Won	
11	112 not out	Sri Lanka	3	2	98.24	Wanderers Stadium, Johannesburg	Home	3 March 2019	Won	
12	100	Australia	3	1	106.38	Old Trafford, Manchester	Neutral	6 July 2019	Won	

T20I centuries
No.	Score	Against	Pos.	Inn.	S/R	Venue	H/A/N	Date	Result	Ref
1	119	West Indies	3	1	212.50	Wanderers Stadium, Johannesburg	Home	11 January 2015	Lost	

== Ball tampering controversies ==
du Plessis has been found guilty of ball tampering twice during his international career. The first time was during The Oval Test match in 2013 against Pakistan. In 2016, du Plessis was caught again ball tampering during the Hobart Test match against Australia.

The first incident against Pakistan involved du Plessis rubbing the ball against a zip on his trousers in order to change the nature of the ball. This was caught on video and du Plessis was subsequently found guilty. He was fined 50% of his match fee. The second incident against Australia involved du Plessis rubbing what looked like a "lolly" or mint, on the ball in order to make one side sticky. du Plessis denied any wrongdoing and he pleaded not guilty to the charge. His teammate Hashim Amla defended him in a statement to the Australian media about the incident stating that the tampering claims were "a joke" and called them "ridiculous".

Regardless of the denials, du Plessis was found guilty of ball tampering on 21 November 2016. He was subsequently fined 100% of his match fee for the second Test against Australia and he was given three demerit points. Four demerit points within 24 months leads to a one Test or two limited-over games suspension. du Plessis played the next test and scored a century. The following month he was made captain of the South African cricket team.

== Early life ==
du Plessis attended Afrikaanse Hoër Seunskool (Afrikaans High School for Boys, also known as Affies), a public school located in Pretoria. He attended alongside fellow Titans cricketers AB de Villiers, Heino Kuhn and Jacques Rudolph. He is also a graduate of the University of Pretoria. du Plessis is a second cousin of Namibian rugby player Marcel du Plessis. His father Francois du Plessis played rugby in the centre position for Northern Transvaal in the 1980s. du Plessis was featured in the music video for the song "Maak Jou Drome Waar", a duet by AB de Villiers and Ampie du Preez.

== Personal life ==
du Plessis married his long-time girlfriend Imari Visser in November 2013 at Kleine Zalze. They have two daughters. His sister Rhemi is married to fellow South African international cricketer Hardus Viljoen in December 2019.

He is a Christian and has said, "I know that my purpose is about more than the runs I score on the cricket field. I hope to be able to spend time with people to show them the love of Jesus and see His love shine through them as well."

On 17 July 2020, du Plessis released a statement via Instagram, showing support for the Black Lives Matter movement, following fellow Protea player Lungi Ngidi's request for Cricket South Africa to be vocal about the movement and to address racism in cricket. du Plessis admitted that due to his ignorance, he silenced the struggles of others when he previously stated he does not see colour: "[I] acknowledge that South Africa is still hugely divided by racism and it is my personal responsibility to do my best to emphasise, hear the stories, learn and then be part of the solution with my thoughts, words and actions". He concluded his statement, saying "All lives don't matter UNTIL black lives matter. I'm speaking up now, because if I wait to be perfect, I never will. I want to leave a legacy of empathy. The work needs to continue for the change to come and whether we agree or disagree, conversation is the vehicle for change".

On 7 October 2022, du Plessis announced on his Instagram and Twitter profiles that his autobiography, FAF: Through Fire, would be released on 28 October 2022.

Following the publication of his autobiography, du Plessis remarked in an interview, "I asked myself the question: 'If you write this book, what are the kind of things people resonate with you as a person, as a leader?' And the answer was honesty and vulnerability."
