= Simon Neal (cricketer) =

English cricketer

Personal information
- Full name: Simon Nicholas Neal
- Born: 2 January 1972 (age 54); Nottingham, Nottinghamshire, England
- Batting: Right-handed
- Bowling: Right-arm medium
- Role: Occasional wicketkeeper

Domestic team information
- Years: Team
- 1999: Nottinghamshire Cricket Board

Career statistics
Competition	LA
Matches	1
Runs scored	7
Batting average	7.00
100s/50s	–/–
Top score	7
Catches/stumpings	–/–
- Source: Cricinfo, 23 November 2010

Simon Nicholas Neal (born 2 January 1972) is a former English cricketer. Neal was a right-handed batsman who bowled right-arm medium pace and who occasionally played as a wicketkeeper. He was born in Nottingham, Nottinghamshire.

Neal represented the Nottinghamshire Cricket Board in a single List A match against Scotland in the 1st round of the 1999 NatWest Trophy. In his only List A match he scored 7 runs.
