= Ampie du Preez =

South African singer-songwriter

Ampie Du Preez
- Born: May 27, 1982 (age 44)
- Origin: Pretoria, South Africa
- Occupation: Singer-songwriter
- Instruments: guitar, vocals
- Label: Sony BMG

Ampie Du Preez (born c. 1982) is a South African singer-songwriter. In 2010 he collaborated with South African cricketer AB de Villiers on their debut album, Maak Jou Drome Waar (Make Your Dreams Come True).

Ampie previously worked with South African group 'n Man Soos Jan.

He has also done songwriting for South African artist Elizma Theron. He penned the title track to her 2009 album "Ek Soek Jou."

He released his first album entitled "Definitely Maybe" when he was in grade 11.

He formed a duet with former Eden member Sean Else called 34 Grade Suid. They released their first album "Staan Vas". Music videos were released for both the single "Val Sonder Jou" (in early March 2011) and for the title track in July 2011.

He released his solo album entitled "S.O.S." in April 2012. Music videos were released for both the single "Klaradyn" in March 2012 and for the title track in June 2012.

== Personal life ==
Ampie is friends with record producer, Murray Lubbe, who produced Maak Jou Drome Waar.

He holds a Bachelor of Commerce in financial management from the University of Pretoria.
