= Peter Scott (cricketer, born 1982) =

English cricketer

Personal information
- Full name: Peter James Scott
- Born: 20 November 1982 (age 43); Nottingham, Nottinghamshire, England
- Batting: Right-handed
- Bowling: Right-arm off break
- Role: Bowler

Domestic team information
- Years: Team
- 2006: Herefordshire
- 2004–2005: Staffordshire
- 2001: Nottinghamshire Cricket Board

Career statistics
| Competition | LA |
|---|---|
| Matches | 1 |
| Runs scored | – |
| Batting average | – |
| 100s/50s | –/– |
| Top score | – |
| Balls bowled | 42 |
| Wickets | 1 |
| Bowling average | 28.00 |
| 5 wickets in innings | 0 |
| 10 wickets in match | – |
| Best bowling | 1/28 |
| Catches/stumpings | 0/– |
- Source: Cricinfo, 22 November 2010

Peter James Scott (born 20 November 1982) is an English cricketer. Scott is a right-handed batsman who bowls right-arm off break. He was born in Nottingham, Nottinghamshire.

Scott represented the Nottinghamshire Cricket Board in a single List A match against Bedfordshire in the 1st round of the 2001 Cheltenham & Gloucester Trophy. In his only List A match he took a single wicket at a cost of 28 runs.

In 2004, he made his Minor Counties Championship debut for Staffordshire against Bedfordshire. Scott played 2 further Championship matches for the county, against Norfolk in 2004 and Hertfordshire in 2005.

Scott joined Herefordshire in 2006, representing the county in 6 Championship matches during that season, the last of which came against Cornwall. He also represented the county in the MCCA Knockout Trophy, making his debut against Northumberland. During the 2006 season, he played 2 further Trophy matches against Cheshire and Shropshire.
