= Kimberley Institute Cricket Club =

Personnel
- Captain: (England) George Bacon

Team information
- Founded: 1878
- Home ground: Private Ground, Kimberley
- Capacity: 500

History
- Notts Premier wins: 3
- Official website: kimberley.play-cricket.com

Kimberley Institute Cricket Club is an English cricket club based in Kimberley, Nottinghamshire. The club compete in the Nottinghamshire Cricket Board Premier League, which is an accredited ECB Premier League, winning the league title in 2000, 2015 and 2019.
