= Nottinghamshire Cricket Board Premier League =

EBC Premier League

- Countries: England
- Administrator: ECB
- Format: Limited Overs
- First edition: 1999 (ECB Premier League)
- Tournament format: League
- Number of teams: 12 (Premier League)
- Current champion: Kimberley Institute CC
- Most successful: West Indian Cavaliers CC (9)
- Website: https://nottinghamshirecbpl.play-cricket.com/

The Nottinghamshire Cricket Board Premier League is the top level of competition for recreational club cricket in Nottinghamshire, England, and since it was formed in 1999 it has been a designated ECB Premier League.

It has two feeder leagues serving the North and South of the county:

- Bassetlaw and District Cricket League - North
- South Nottinghamshire Cricket League - South

The early years of the league were dominated by West Indian Cavaliers, who were champions in nine of the first fifteen seasons of competition. After the 2017 season the club entered into a merger and became Cavaliers and Carrington.

The league attracts many top players, notable stars include: Alex Tudor, Saqlain Mushtaq, Usman Afzaal and Bilal Shafayat.

== Winners ==
- | Year | Champions |
  |---|---|
  | 1999 | West Indian Cavaliers |
  | 2000 | Kimberley Institute |
  | 2001 | West Indian Cavaliers |
  | 2002 | West Indian Cavaliers |
  | 2003 | West Indian Cavaliers |
  | 2004 | West Indian Cavaliers |
  | 2005 | West Indian Cavaliers |
  | 2006 | Caythorpe |
  | 2007 | West Indian Cavaliers |
  | 2008 | West Indian Cavaliers |
  | 2009 | Clifton Village |
  | 2010 | Clifton Village |
  | 2011 | Clifton Village |
  | 2012 | Cuckney |
  | 2013 | West Indian Cavaliers |
  | 2014 | Cuckney |
  | 2015 | Kimberley Institute |
  | 2016 | Cuckney |
  | 2017 | Cuckney |
  | 2018 | Cavaliers and Carrington |
- | Year | Champions |
  |---|---|
  | 2019 | Kimberley Institute |
  | 2020 | League suspended |
  | 2021 | Kimberley Institute |
  | 2022 | Cavaliers and Carrington |
  | 2023 | Cuckney |
  | 2024 | Cavaliers and Carrington |
  | 2025 | Cavaliers and Carrington |
  | 2026 | Kimberley Institute |
- | Wins | Club |
  |---|---|
  | 9 | West Indian Cavaliers |
  | 5 | Cuckney |
  | 5 | Kimberley Institute |
  | 4 | Cavaliers and Carrington |
  | 3 | Clifton Village |
  | 1 | Caythorpe |

== Premier League performance by season from 1999 ==
Key
| Gold | Champions |
| Blue | Left League |
| Red | Relegated |

Performance by season, from 1999
| Club | 1999 | 2000 | 2001 | 2002 | 2003 | 2004 | 2005 | 2006 | 2007 | 2008 | 2009 | 2010 | 2011 | 2012 | 2013 | 2014 | 2015 | 2016 | 2017 | 2018 | 2019 | 2020 | 2021 | 2022 | 2023 | 2024 | 2025 | 2026 |
|---|---|---|---|---|---|---|---|---|---|---|---|---|---|---|---|---|---|---|---|---|---|---|---|---|---|---|---|---|
| Arnold | 10 | 11 | | | | | | | | | | | | | | | | | | | | | | | | | | |
| Attenborough | | | | | | | | | | | 10 | 12 | | | | | 12 | | 11 | 10 | 9 | | 10 | 8 | 10 | 7 | 7 | 12 |
| Balderton | | | 12 | | | | | | | | | | | | | | | | | | | | | | | | | |
| Belvoir | | | | | | | | | | | | | 11 | | | | | | | | | | | | | | | |
| Blidworth Colliery Welfare | | | 9 | 5 | 12 | | | | | | | | | | | | | | | | | | | | | | | |
| Bracebridge Heath (Note: Bracebridge Heath left the league after the 2002 season to join the Lincolnshire Premier League.) | 4 | 4 | 4 | 6 | | | | | | | | | | | | | | | | | | | | | | | | |
| Bridon (Note: Bridon entered into a merger after the 2009 season and became Ordsall Bridon.) | 8 | 7 | 6 | 11 | 11 | | | | | | | | | | | | | | | | | | | | | | | |
| Calverton | | | | | | 11 | | | | | | | | | | | | | | | | | | | | | | |
| Cavaliers and Carrington (Note: West Indian Cavaliers entered into a merger after the 2017 season and became Cavaliers and Carrington.) | | | | | | | | | | | | | | | | | | | | 1 | 2 | | 2 | 1 | 3 | 1 | 1 | 6 |
| Caythorpe | | 5 | 3 | 8 | 4 | 4 | 4 | 1 | 4 | 3 | 2 | 6 | 7 | 4 | 5 | 5 | 4 | 7 | 9 | 11 | 5 | | 11 | | | | | 11 |
| Clifton Village (Note: Clifton Village resigned from the Premier League after the 2016 season and dropped down to the South Nottinghamshire Cricket League.) | | 9 | 7 | 3 | 10 | 5 | 6 | 7 | 6 | 5 | 1 | 1 | 1 | 7 | 10 | 6 | 8 | 8 | | | | | 6 | 10 | 11 | | | |
| Clipstone | | | | | | | | | | | | | | | | | | | | | | | | | | | 5 | 5 |
| Collingham and District | | | | | 5 | 7 | 11 | | | | | | | | | | | | | | | | | | | | 10 | 8 |
| Cuckney | | | | | | | | | | 6 | 3 | 3 | 6 | 1 | 3 | 1 | 3 | 1 | 1 | 2 | 4 | | 4 | 2 | 1 | 3 | 2 | 2 |
| Farnsfield | | | | | | | | | | | 11 | | | | 11 | | 11 | | 10 | 6 | 11 | | | | | | | |
| Gedling Colliery | | | | | | | 12 | | 9 | 12 | | | | | | | | | | | 12 | | | | | | | |
| Gedling & Sherwood | | | | | | | | | | | | | | | | | | | | | | | | 12 | | | | |
| Hucknall | | | | | | | | | | | | | | | | | | 10 | 5 | 9 | 10 | | 9 | 5 | 6 | 4 | 6 | 3 |
| Killamarsh | | | | | | | | | 7 | 11 | | | | | | | | | | | | | | | | | | |
| Kimberley Institute | 6 | 1 | 2 | 4 | 2 | 3 | 3 | 2 | 2 | 2 | 9 | 5 | 5 | 5 | 8 | 7 | 1 | 6 | 3 | 3 | 1 | | 1 | 4 | 2 | 2 | 3 | 1 |
| Kiveton Park Colliery | | | | | | | | | | | | | 12 | | | | | | | | | | | | | | | |
| Long Eaton | 12 | | | | | | | 11 | | | | | | | | | | | | | | | | | | | | |
| Mansfield Hosiery Mills | | | | | | | 10 | 10 | 8 | 8 | 6 | 8 | 9 | 6 | 6 | 12 | | 5 | 6 | 12 | | | 12 | | 12 | | | 9 |
| Nottinghamshire Academy (Note: Nottinghamshire Academy withdrew from league cricket after the 2017 season.) | | | | | | | | | | | | 7 | 3 | 2 | 4 | 4 | 6 | 4 | 8 | | | | | | | | | |
| Notts & Arnold Amateur | | | | | | | | | | | | | | | | | | | | | | | | 11 | | 9 | 8 | 10 |
| Notts Unity Casuals | 5 | 10 | 10 | 9 | 6 | 10 | 8 | 4 | 11 | | | | | | | | | | | | | | | | | | | |
| Ordsall Bridon | | | | | | | | | | | | | | | | 11 | 10 | 12 | | | | | | | | | | |
| Papplewick and Linby | | | | | 8 | 8 | 7 | 6 | 5 | 4 | 5 | 4 | 10 | 10 | 12 | | | | | 8 | 6 | | 5 | 3 | 4 | 6 | 9 | 4 |
| Plumtree | | | | | | | | | | 9 | 12 | | | 8 | 9 | 2 | 2 | 2 | 2 | 4 | 8 | | 8 | 6 | 7 | 8 | 11 | |
| Radcliffe on Trent | 3 | 6 | 11 | | | | | | | | | 11 | | | | 9 | 9 | 9 | 7 | 7 | 7 | | 3 | 9 | 8 | 12 | | |
| Retford | | | | 12 | | 9 | 9 | 9 | 12 | | | | | | | | | | | | | | | | | | | |
| Rolls Royce Leisure (Note: Rolls Royce Leisure were expelled from the league after the 2014 season because they were unable to provide a suitable home ground in Nottinghamshire; the league allowed them one year's grace playing their home games in Derby but was not willing to provide a second, and the club went out of existence.) | | | | | | | | | | | | | | | 2 | 8 | | | | | | | | | | | | |
| Southwell | 9 | 12 | | 10 | 9 | 12 | | | | | | | | | | | | | | | | | | | | | | |
| Thoresby Colliery | | | | | | | | 12 | | | | | | | | | | | | | | | | | | | | |
| Welbeck Colliery | 2 | 2 | 5 | 2 | 3 | 2 | 2 | 8 | 10 | 10 | 8 | 9 | 4 | 9 | 7 | 10 | 7 | 11 | 12 | | | | | | | 10 | 12 | |
| West Indian Cavaliers | 1 | 3 | 1 | 1 | 1 | 1 | 1 | 3 | 1 | 1 | 4 | 2 | 2 | 3 | 1 | 3 | 5 | 3 | 4 | | | | | | | | | |
| West Bridgfordians | | | | | | | | | | | | | | | | | | | | | | | | | 9 | 11 | | |
| Wollaton | 7 | 8 | 8 | 7 | 7 | 6 | 5 | 5 | 3 | 7 | 7 | 10 | 8 | 11 | | | | | | 5 | 3 | | 7 | 7 | 5 | 5 | 4 | 7 |
| Worksop | 11 | | | | | | | | | | | | | 12 | | | | | | | | | | | | | | |
| References | | | | | | | | | | | | | | | | | | | | | | (Note: Coronavirus pandemic forced all formal competitive sporting activities to be suspended.) | | | | | | |
