= South Africa women's cricket team in England in 2018 =

International cricket tour

	England women	South Africa women
- Dates: 9–15 June 2018
Captains	Heather Knight	Dane van Niekerk

One Day International series
- Results: England women won the 3-match series 2–1
Most runs	Tammy Beaumont (212)	Lizelle Lee (211)
Most wickets	Katherine Brunt (6)	Ayabonga Khaka (7)
- Player of the series: Tammy Beaumont (Eng)

The South Africa women's cricket team toured England in the 2018 cricket season, playing three Women's One Day Internationals (WODIs) against the England women's cricket team, followed by a tri-series which also featured New Zealand. The WODI series formed part of the 2017–2020 ICC Women's Championship, which determined qualification for the 2022 Women's Cricket World Cup. England were captained by Heather Knight, while South Africa were led by Dane van Niekerk.

The three-match WODI series started at New Road, Worcester, where a score of 92 not out from Lizelle Lee and a strong bowling performance helped South Africa to victory. The win was their first against the hosts in England for fifteen years. In the second match, at the County Cricket Ground, Hove, England batted first once again, and centuries from Sarah Taylor and Tammy Beaumont propelled them to 331 for six. (Note: "331 for six" is cricket notation which could also be written 331/6, and signifies that the batting team has scored 331 runs, and has lost six of its ten wickets. See Scoring (cricket) for more information.) Despite a century from Lee, South Africa could not chase the target down, and England levelled the series. The final match was played at St Lawrence Ground in Canterbury, where South Africa won the toss and chose to bat first. They were bowled out with one ball of the innings remaining for 228; van Niekerk top-scored with 95. In response, England chased down their required target with six overs remaining, during which Beaumont scored her second century of the series.

== Venues ==
Venues used during the WODI series
Worcester	Hove	Canterbury
New Road	County Cricket Ground	St Lawrence Ground
Aerial photograph of New Road cricket ground	Photograph of the County Cricket Ground in Hove, showing benches in the foreground and the cricket field beyond that	Photograph of St Lawrence Ground, showing a cricket patch taking place in the foreground and the pavilion behind
Location of venues within the UK (Southern England)

== Squads ==
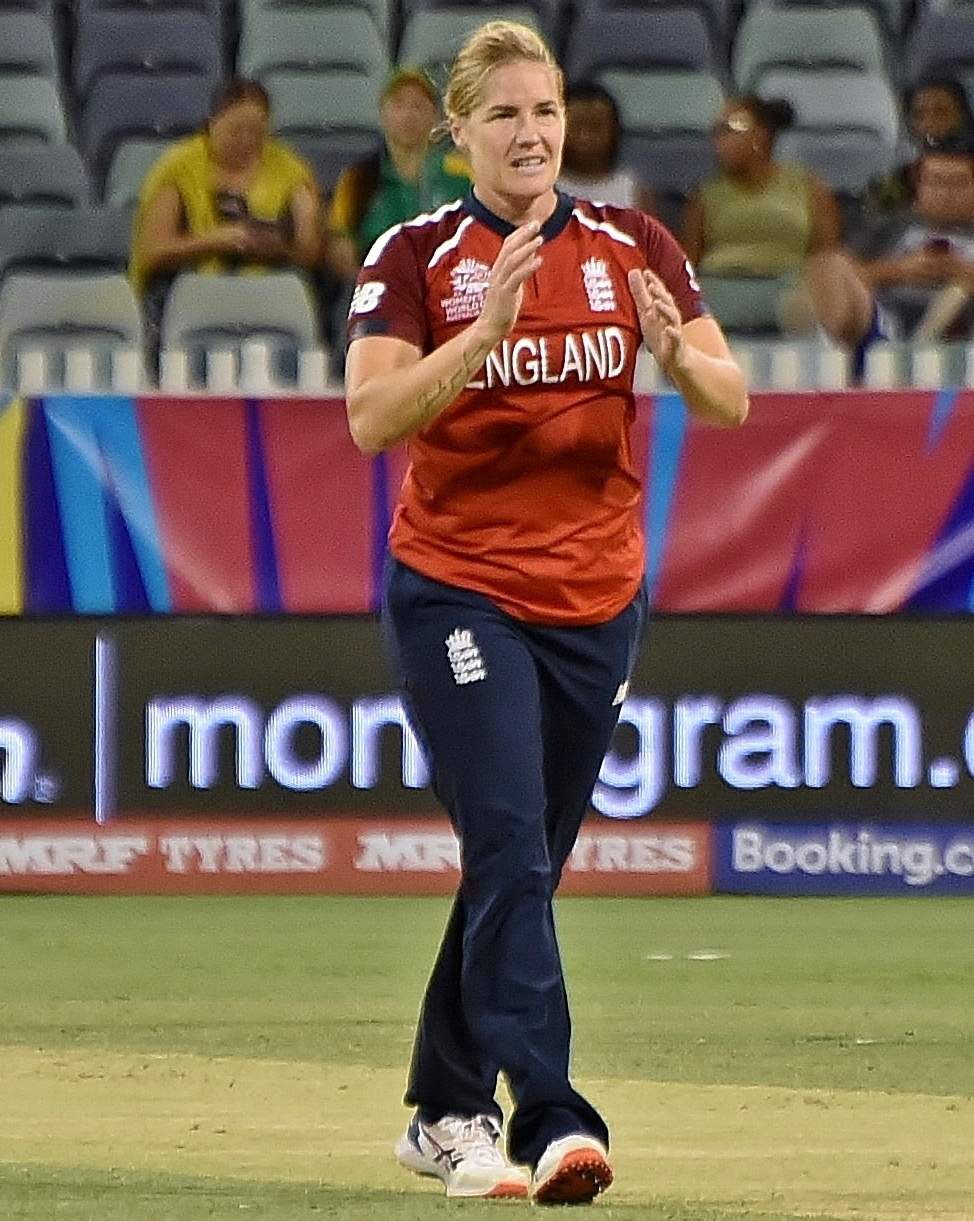
Katherine Brunt returned to the England side for the series after injury.

South Africa named 15 players for their 2018 tour of England, making one change from the squads that had whitewashed Bangladesh during May, omitting Trisha Chetty, who had played over 150 international matches, and been their wicket-keeper for 10 years. Three of the players included—Tazmin Brits, Stacy Lackay and Zintle Mali—had made their debuts during the Bangladesh series, and a preview by Cricbuzz suggested that they were included primarily for the Women's Twenty20 International tri-series, looking toward the 2018 ICC Women's World Twenty20. Brits was suggested by Cricbuzz as a long-term replacement for Chetty as wicket-keeper, but an International Cricket Council (ICC) preview of the series suggested that Lizelle Lee was more likely to take on the role. Writing for CRICKETher, the journalist Syd Egan said that South Africa were also boosted by the availability of Laura Wolvaardt, who had started medical school in early 2018 but after about a month of studies had her place held so she could continue her cricket career. Egan said that without Wolvaardt, South Africa's batting could be "as brittle as it can sometimes be brilliant".

England initially named a 14-player squad for the first two matches, and made a few changes from their touring party which played India in April. Katherine Brunt and Sarah Taylor, who had both missed the India tour for medical reasons, returned to the squad, while Georgia Elwiss, Laura Marsh and Lauren Winfield were also recalled. Alex Hartley, Kate Cross and Tash Farrant were among six players who toured India that missed out on the first two WODIs. Egan noted that England's squad was very talented and full of experienced players, but lacked younger players, and he questioned whether England were "producing the players they trust to go out there and score runs and take wickets". England subsequently added Cross to the squad for the third WODI, while Danielle Hazell and Winfield were released from the squad.

Squads
England	South Africa
Heather Knight (c); Tammy Beaumont; Katherine Brunt; Kate Cross (Note: Third WODI only); Sophie Ecclestone; Georgia Elwiss; Jenny Gunn; Danielle Hazell (Note: First and second WODIs only); Amy Jones (wk); Laura Marsh; Anya Shrubsole; Nat Sciver; Sarah Taylor (wk); Lauren Winfield; Danni Wyatt	Dane van Niekerk (c); Tazmin Brits (wk); Shabnim Ismail; Marizanne Kapp; Ayabonga Khaka; Masabata Klaas; Stacy Lackay; Lizelle Lee (wk); Suné Luus; Zintle Mali; Raisibe Ntozakhe; Mignon du Preez; Andrie Steyn; Chloe Tryon; Laura Wolvaardt

== WODI series ==
=== 1st WODI ===
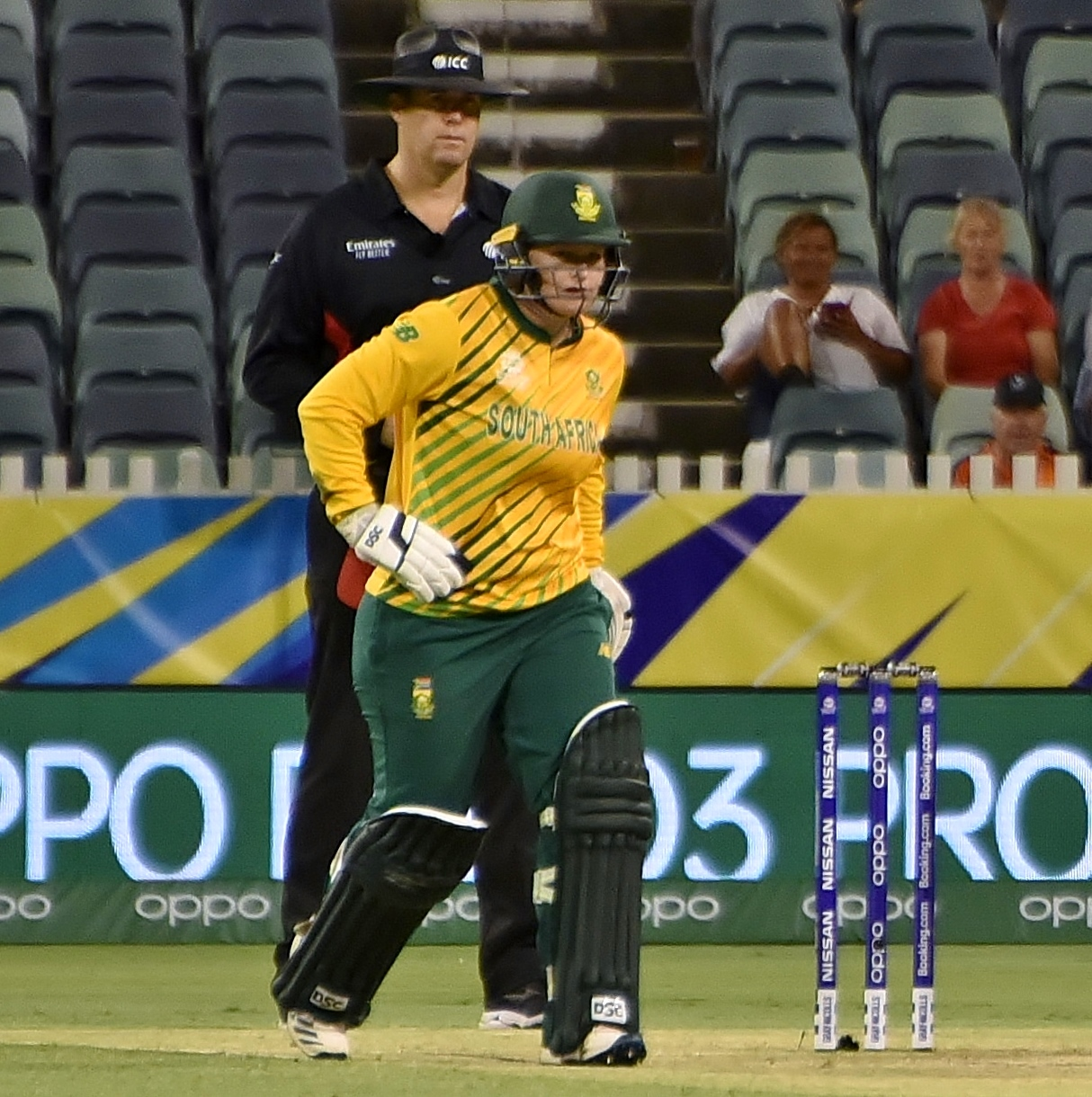
Lizelle Lee was named as player of the match.

The first women's One Day International (WODI) was played at New Road, Worcester on 9 June. England won the toss and their captain, Heather Knight, decided to bat first. Amy Jones started the innings well for England, but was bowled by Shabnim Ismail in the fifth over for 19, after scoring all but one of England's runs to that point. Writing for ESPNcricinfo, Melinda Farrell praised South Africa's bowling attack, particularly Ismail and Marizanne Kapp, who she said "cannily exploited" the conditions. Taylor and Knight were both dismissed leg before wicket (lbw) in the next three overs for two and four runs respectively, leaving England on 29 for three. Ayabonga Khaka was brought in as South Africa's first bowling change, and took a wicket with her first delivery, described by Farrell as "a corker: a hint of movement through the air before the ball jagged off the seam to beat the inside of Tammy Beaumont's bat". Khaka took two more wickets in the seventeenth over: Sciver got a leading edge which was caught by Dane van Niekerk, while Danni Wyatt was caught at cover by Suné Luus after playing at a wide delivery, moving England to 64 for six. Brunt helped England to recover, as she scored her highest total for England, remaining 72 not out at the end of the innings. After initially scoring slowly, Brunt accelerated her rate and batted alongside the tail to see England finish on 189 for nine.

In response, South Africa lost Wolvaardt and Luus inside the first three overs. Wolvaardt was bowled by Brunt, while Luus was stumped by Taylor off a leg-side wide when South Africa had only scored five runs. South Africa's captain, van Niekerk, joined the opening batter Lee at the crease, and the pair played cautiously against England's opening bowlers, and then more aggressively against the other bowlers. Van Niekerk was the more attacking of the pair during their partnership, and was eventually bowled for 58 when England brought back one of their opening bowlers, Anya Shrubsole. Lee then took on a more attacking role and appeared to be caught by Brunt after scoring 68 runs, but a review by the third umpire adjudged that the ball had not been caught cleanly. Lee and Mignon du Preez both remained not out to help South Africa to victory with 27 balls remaining; Lee scored 92 and du Preez 36. The win was South Africa's first against the hosts in England for fifteen years, since their 2003 tour.

ICC Women's Championship
9 June 2018
11:00
Scorecard

England; 189/9 (50 overs)	v	South Africa; 193/3 (45.3 overs)
Katherine Brunt 72* (98); Shabnim Ismail 3/25 (10 overs)		Lizelle Lee 92* (128); Anya Shrubsole 2/36 (10 overs)

South Africa Women won by 7 wickets
New Road, Worcester
Umpires: Mike Burns (Eng) and Tim Robinson (Eng)
Player of the match: Lizelle Lee (SA)

- England Women won the toss and elected to bat.
- Stacy Lackay (SA) made her WODI debut.
- Points: South Africa Women 2, England Women 0.

=== 2nd WODI ===
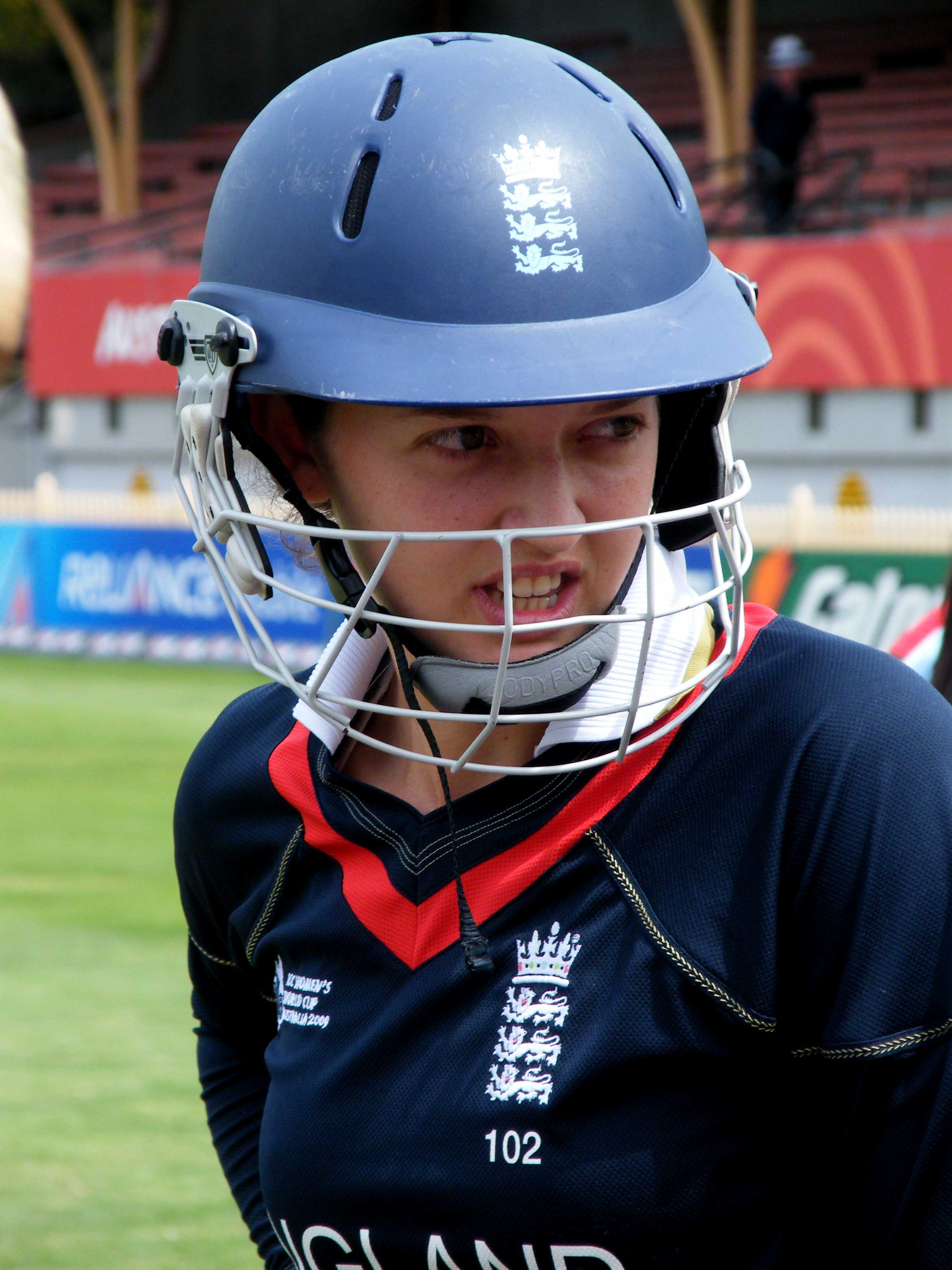
Sarah Taylor was one of a record three players to score a century during the match.

The series moved to the County Cricket Ground in Hove on 12 June for the second match, which was played as a day/night game. Dane van Niekerk won the toss for South Africa, and opted to chase again, letting England bat first. In contrast to the first match, England put together two strong partnerships; Jones and Tammy Beaumont put on 71 runs together before Jones was caught for 29. Taylor then joined Beaumont and the pair added 126 runs. Beaumont was praised by ESPNcricinfo's Andrew Miller for her combination of powerful shots with sweeps which prevented South Africa's bowlers from finding a rhythm. Beaumont reached her century from 107 balls, before being dismissed two deliveries later, caught in the deep. Taylor maintained England's momentum, reaching her own century from 93 balls, and going on to score 118. England finished on 331 for six, the highest score in women's ODIs at Hove.

As in the first match, South Africa began cautiously against England's opening bowlers; they scored 32 runs without losing a wicket from the first 10 overs, but then accelerated sharply, adding another 110 runs from the next 15 overs. Lee was once again South Africa's best batter; when Wolvaardt was caught behind off Brunt's bowling, she had only scored 32 of South Africa's 142 runs. Luus was dismissed next, three overs later for two runs, before Lee was caught at backward point. She had scored 117 runs from 107 deliveries, batting with what Miller described as "ferocious power". Her century marked the first time a women's international cricket match had featured three centuries. After her dismissal, at which stage the score had been 170 for three, South Africa lost their momentum, and the required run rate began to climb. Chloe Tryon added 44 runs from 26 balls, including seven boundaries, but South Africa were regularly losing wickets, and eventually completed their 50 overs on 262 for nine, losing by 69 runs.

ICC Women's Championship
12 June 2018
13:00 (D/N)
Scorecard

England; 331/6 (50 overs)	v	South Africa; 262/9 (50 overs)
Sarah Taylor 118 (106); Tammy Beaumont 101 (109); Marizanne Kapp 2/48 (10 overs)		Lizelle Lee 117 (107) Sophie Ecclestone 3/54 (10 overs)

England Women won by 69 runs
County Cricket Ground, Hove
Umpires: Michael Gough (Eng) and David Millns (Eng)
Player of the match: Sarah Taylor (Eng)

- South Africa Women won the toss and elected to field.
- Points: England Women 2, South Africa Women 0.

=== 3rd WODI ===
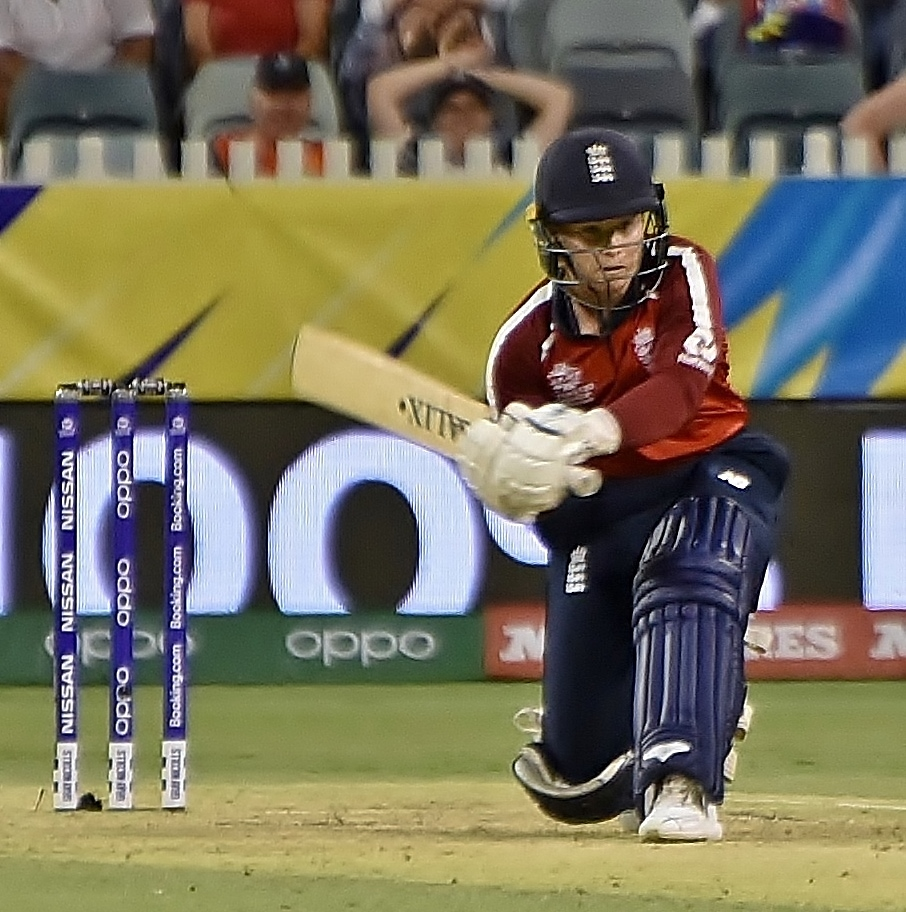
Tammy Beaumont scored her second century of the series to help England win the third WODI

The final match of the series, which was tied at 1–1 after two matches, was played at St Lawrence Ground in Canterbury on 15 June. South Africa won the toss for the second consecutive game, and chose to bat first. Lee, who had scored the bulk of South Africa's runs in the first two matches was dismissed (lbw) early, after only scoring two runs. Replays subsequently showed that it was the wrong decision, as the ball would not have gone on to hit the stumps, but there was no review system in place to reprieve Lee. Andrie Steyn and Wolvaardt added fifty runs together before Steyn was out lbw to Sophie Ecclestone, leaving South Africa 58 for two. Dane van Niekerk joined Wolvaardt, and the pair scored a century partnership, albeit at a slow scoring-rate. Wolvaardt's dismissal for 64 brought Tryon in, and she and van Niekerk adopted a more attacking batting style. Tryon scored 19 runs from 16 balls, and soon after van Niekerk was also out, stumped by Taylor for 95 runs. ESPNcricinfo's Miller described the stumping as "outstanding moment of the innings". South Africa's lower-order batters did not add much to the score; du Preez scored 17 runs but four of the last five batters for South Africa did not score, and South Africa finished with 228 runs.

In their response, the England openers—Jones and Beaumont—scored 39 runs before Jones was dismissed for 24. Taylor only scored five runs before she was bowler by Khaka, and Knight joined Beaumont at the crease. The pair then added 154 runs together; Knight passed her half-century, while Beaumont scored a 121-ball century, her second in consecutive matches, before being dismissed lbw two balls later. Knight was joined by Sciver and England reached their target two win by seven wickets with six overs remaining.

ICC Women's Championship
15 June 2018
14:00 (D/N)
Scorecard

South Africa; 228 (49.5 overs)	v	England; 232/3 (44 overs)
Dane van Niekerk 95 (106); Katherine Brunt 3/52 (10 overs)		Tammy Beaumont 105 (123); Ayabonga Khaka 2/63 (9 overs)

England Women won by 7 wickets
St Lawrence Ground, Canterbury
Umpires: Jeremy Lloyds (Eng) and Steve O'Shaughnessy (Eng)
Player of the match: Tammy Beaumont (Eng)

- South Africa Women won the toss and elected to bat.
- Nat Sciver (Eng) played in her 50th WODI.
- Points: England Women 2, South Africa Women 0.
