= Jannatul Ferdus (cricketer) =

Bangladeshi cricketer (born 1999)

Personal information
- Full name: Most Jannatul Ferdus Sumona
- Born: 12 December 1999 (age 26); Nilphamari, Rangpur, Bangladesh
- Batting: Right-handed
- Bowling: Right-arm off break
- Role: All-rounder

International information
- National side: Bangladesh
- ODI debut (cap 28): 6 May 2018 v South Africa
- Last ODI: 9 May 2018 v South Africa
- T20I debut (cap 26): 20 May 2018 v South Africa
- Last T20I: 7 December 2024 v Ireland

Domestic team information
- Years: Team
- 2017–2017/18: Sylhet Division
- 2022/23–present: Australian Capital Territory

Career statistics
Competition	ODI	T20I
Matches	2	1
Runs scored	1	–
Batting average	0.50	–
100s/50s	0/0	–
Top score	1	–
Catches/stumpings	0/–	0/–
- Source: ESPNcricinfo, 7 April 2022

Most Jannatul Ferdus Sumona (Bengali: জান্নাতুল ফেরদৌস; born 12 December 1999) is a Bangladeshi cricketer who plays as a right-handed batter and right-arm off break bowler, who plays for the Bangladesh women's national cricket team.

== Career ==
Ferdus made her One Day International (ODI) debut and T20I debut against South Africa, on 6 May 2018 and 20 May 2018, respectively, during the Bangladesh women's cricket tour of South Africa in 2018.

In June 2018, she was part of Bangladesh's squad that won their first ever Women's Asia Cup title, winning the 2018 Women's Twenty20 Asia Cup tournament.

In February 2023, she began playing for Australian Capital Territory in the Women's National Cricket League.

Ferdus was part of the Bangladesh squad for the 2025 Women's Cricket World Cup Qualifier in Pakistan in April 2025.
