= Associate international cricket in 2018 =

International cricket season

The 2018 Associate international cricket season was from July to August 2018. The International Cricket Council (ICC) granted Twenty20 International (T20I) status to matches between the women's national teams of all of its Associate members from 1 July 2018 (and between their men's national teams from 1 January 2019). As a result, many teams were able to play official WT20I cricket for the first time. The season included all WT20I cricket series mostly involving ICC Associate members, that were played in addition to series covered in International cricket in 2018.

== Season overview ==
Women's International tours
Start date	Home team	Away team	Results [Matches]
Start date	Home team	Away team	WT20I
9 August 2018	Malaysia	Singapore	4–2 [6]
Women's international tournaments
Start date	Tournament		Winners
20 August 2018	(Botswana) 2018 BCA Women's T20I Series		Namibia
23 August 2018	(Colombia) 2018 South American Championship		Brazil

== August ==
=== Singapore women in Malaysia ===
WT20I series
No.	Date	Home captain	Away captain	Venue	Result
WT20I 463	9 August	Emylia Eliani	Diviya G K	Selangor Turf Club, Kuala Lumpur	Malaysia by 38 runs
WT20I 464	9 August	Emylia Eliani	Diviya G K	Selangor Turf Club, Kuala Lumpur	Malaysia by 6 wickets
WT20I 465	10 August	Emylia Eliani	Diviya G K	Selangor Turf Club, Kuala Lumpur	Singapore by 29 runs
WT20I 466	10 August	Emylia Eliani	Diviya G K	Selangor Turf Club, Kuala Lumpur	Singapore by 5 wickets
WT20I 467	11 August	Emylia Eliani	Diviya G K	Selangor Turf Club, Kuala Lumpur	Malaysia by 26 runs
WT20I 468	12 August	Emylia Eliani	Diviya G K	UKM-YSD Cricket Oval, Bangi	Malaysia by 4 wickets

=== 2018 Botswana Cricket Association Women's T20I Series ===
Team	P	W	L	T	NR	Pts	NRR
Namibia	5	5	0	0	0	10	+5.701
Sierra Leone	5	4	1	0	0	8	+1.039
Botswana	5	3	2	0	0	6	+2.183
Mozambique	5	2	3	0	0	4	–0.783
Malawi	5	1	4	0	0	2	–1.563
Lesotho	5	0	5	0	0	0	–5.160

Round-robin
No.	Date	Team 1	Captain 1	Team 2	Captain 2	Venue	Result
WT20I 469	20 August	Botswana	Laura Mophakedi	Lesotho	Boitumelo Phelenyane	Botswana Cricket Association Oval 1, Gaborone	Botswana by 124 runs
WT20I 470	20 August	Malawi	Mary Mabvuka	Namibia	Yasmeen Khan	Botswana Cricket Association Oval 2, Gaborone	Namibia by 9 wickets
WT20I 471	20 August	Mozambique	Fatima Guirrugo	Sierra Leone	Linda Bull	Botswana Cricket Association Oval 1, Gaborone	Sierra Leone by 6 wickets
WT20I 472	20 August	Botswana	Laura Mophakedi	Malawi	Mary Mabvuka	Botswana Cricket Association Oval 2, Gaborone	Botswana by 58 runs
WT20I 473	21 August	Sierra Leone	Linda Bull	Namibia	Yasmeen Khan	Botswana Cricket Association Oval 1, Gaborone	Namibia by 7 wickets
WT20I 474	21 August	Mozambique	Fatima Guirrugo	Lesotho	Boitumelo Phelenyane	Botswana Cricket Association Oval 2, Gaborone	Mozambique by 70 runs
WT20I 475	21 August	Mozambique	Fatima Guirrugo	Botswana	Laura Mophakedi	Botswana Cricket Association Oval 1, Gaborone	Botswana by 10 wickets
WT20I 476	21 August	Malawi	Mary Mabvuka	Lesotho	Boitumelo Phelenyane	Botswana Cricket Association Oval 2, Gaborone	Malawi by 63 runs
WT20I 477	23 August	Botswana	Laura Mophakedi	Sierra Leone	Linda Bull	Botswana Cricket Association Oval 1, Gaborone	Sierra Leone by 6 wickets
WT20I 478	23 August	Mozambique	Fatima Guirrugo	Namibia	Yasmeen Khan	Botswana Cricket Association Oval 2, Gaborone	Namibia by 10 wickets
WT20I 479	23 August	Namibia	Yasmeen Khan	Lesotho	Boitumelo Phelenyane	Botswana Cricket Association Oval 1, Gaborone	Namibia by 179 runs
WT20I 480	23 August	Sierra Leone	Linda Bull	Malawi	Mary Mabvuka	Botswana Cricket Association Oval 2, Gaborone	Sierra Leone by 56 runs
WT20I 483	24 August	Sierra Leone	Linda Bull	Lesotho	Thandi Kobeli	Botswana Cricket Association Oval 1, Gaborone	Sierra Leone by 80 runs
WT20I 484	24 August	Mozambique	Fatima Guirrugo	Malawi	Mary Mabvuka	Botswana Cricket Association Oval 2, Gaborone	Mozambique by 13 runs
WT20I 485	24 August	Botswana	Laura Mophakedi	Namibia	Yasmeen Khan	Botswana Cricket Association Oval 1, Gaborone	Namibia by 6 wickets
Play-offs
WT20I 488	25 August	Lesotho	Boitumelo Phelenyane	Malawi	Mary Mabvuka	Botswana Cricket Association Oval 1, Gaborone	Malawi by 9 wickets
WT20I 489	25 August	Mozambique	Maria Matine	Botswana	Laura Mophakedi	Botswana Cricket Association Oval 2, Gaborone	Botswana by 9 wickets
WT20I 490	25 August	Sierra Leone	Linda Bull	Namibia	Yasmeen Khan	Botswana Cricket Association Oval 1, Gaborone	Namibia by 9 wickets

=== 2018 South American Women's Cricket Championship ===
Team	P	W	L	T	N/R	Pts	NRR	Status
Brazil	6	6	0	0	0	18	+5.942	Advanced to the Final
Chile	6	4	2	0	0	12	–1.370	Advanced to the Final
Peru	6	1	5	0	0	3	–1.700	Eliminated
Mexico^{1}	6	1	5	0	0	3	–2.268	Eliminated

^{1}CricHQ table incorrectly states that Mexico had 2 wins and 4 defeats; but the results indicate this should be 1 win and 5 defeats.

Round-robin
No.	Date	Team 1	Captain 1	Team 2	Captain 2	Venue	Result
WT20I 481	23 August	Brazil	Roberta Avery	Mexico	Caroline Owen	Los Pinos Polo Club Field 1, Cundinamarca	Brazil by 91 runs
WT20I 482	23 August	Brazil	Roberta Avery	Chile	Jeannette Gonzalez	Los Pinos Polo Club Field 2, Cundinamarca	Brazil by 111 runs
WT20I 486	24 August	Mexico	Caroline Owen	Chile	Jeannette Gonzalez	Los Pinos Polo Club Field 1, Cundinamarca	Chile by 4 wickets
WT20I 487	24 August	Brazil	Roberta Avery	Mexico	Caroline Owen	Los Pinos Polo Club Field 2, Cundinamarca	Brazil by 150 runs
WT20I 491	25 August	Brazil	Narayana Ribeiro	Chile	Jeannette Gonzalez	Los Pinos Polo Club Field 2, Cundinamarca	Brazil by 91 runs
WT20I 492	26 August	Mexico	Caroline Owen	Chile	Jeannette Gonzalez	Los Pinos Polo Club Field 1, Cundinamarca	Chile by 6 wickets
Final
WT20I 493	26 August	Brazil	Narayana Ribeiro	Chile	Jeannette Gonzalez	Los Pinos Polo Club Field 2, Cundinamarca	Brazil by 92 runs

NB: Matches played by Peru were not recognised as official WT20Is as not all of their players met ICC eligibility criteria.

== See also ==
- International cricket in 2018
