= Stacy Lackay =

South African cricketer (born 1994)

Personal information
- Full name: Stacy Lackay
- Born: 26 May 1994 (age 32)
- Batting: Right-handed
- Bowling: Right-arm off break
- Role: All-rounder, Umpire

International information
- National side: South Africa (2018)
- ODI debut (cap 82): 9 June 2018 v England
- Last ODI: 12 June 2018 v England
- T20I debut (cap 46): 17 May 2018 v Bangladesh
- Last T20I: 20 June 2018 v England

Domestic team information
- Years: Team
- 2007/08–2016/17: Boland
- 2017/18–2022/23: Western Province

Umpiring information
- WODIs umpired: 1 (2025)
- WT20Is umpired: 7 (2024–2026)
- FC umpired: 2 (2025)
- LA umpired: 2 (2025)
- T20 umpired: 4 (2024–2025)

Career statistics
Competition	WODI	WT20I
Matches	2	5
Runs scored	0	16
Batting average	0.00	8.00
100s/50s	0/0	0/0
Top score	0	11*
Balls bowled	–	24
Wickets	–	2
Bowling average	–	29.50
5 wickets in innings	–	0
10 wickets in match	–	0
Best bowling	–	2/59
Catches/stumpings	2/–	2/–
- Source: Cricinfo, 23 March 2024

Stacy Lackay (born 26 May 1994) is a South African cricketer. In April 2018, she was named in the South Africa Women's squad for their series against Bangladesh Women. She made her Women's Twenty20 International (WT20I) debut for South Africa against Bangladesh Women on 17 May 2018. She made her Women's One Day International (WODI) debut for South Africa against England Women on 9 June 2018.
