= International cricket in 2018 =

International cricket season

The 2018 international cricket season was from May 2018 to September 2018. 16 Test matches, 27 One-day Internationals (ODIs) and 33 Twenty20 International (T20Is), as well as 14 Women's One Day Internationals (WODIs) and 81 Women's Twenty20 Internationals (WT20Is), were played during this period.

The season started with India leading the Test cricket rankings, England leading the ODI rankings, Pakistan leading the Twenty20 rankings, and Australia women leading the women's rankings. This season was also the first to be scheduled under the 2018–2023 Future Tours Programme. In addition, all women's Twenty20 matches played between member sides after 1 July were given full international status and classified as WT20Is, as per a decision made by the International Cricket Council (ICC) in April 2018. The first WT20Is to be classified as such under these new rules took place at the 2018 ICC Women's World Twenty20 Qualifier.

Men's international cricket started with Pakistan's tour of Ireland, which included a one-off Test match that Pakistan won. The Test match was Ireland's first. This season also included Afghanistan's first Test match and Nepal's first ODI matches. Scotland beat England for the first time in ODIs after winning the one-off ODI in Edinburgh. Scotland's innings total of 371/5 was the highest score by an Associate team against a Full Member team. In the 3rd ODI of Australia's tour of England, England scored a new record high ODI innings total of 481/6 off 50 overs.

The qualification process for the 2023 Cricket World Cup started with the World Cricket League Division Four tournament that was held in Malaysia. Uganda and Denmark were promoted to Division Three while Vanuatu and Bermuda were relegated to Division Five.

The qualification process for the 2020 ICC T20 World Cup continued in this season. The Africa Eastern Sub Region Qualifier was held in Rwanda and saw Kenya and Uganda qualify for the Africa Regional Qualifier. The Europe Group A, B, and C Sub Region Qualifiers were held in the Netherlands. Denmark, Germany, Guernsey, Italy, Jersey, and Norway qualified for the Europe Regional Qualifier. The East Asia-Pacific (EAP) Group A Sub Region Qualifier was conducted and Papua New Guinea and Vanuatu qualified for the EAP Region Qualifier.

Women's international cricket started off with Bangladesh's tour of South Africa. In the first WODI of New Zealand's tour of Ireland, New Zealand scored a new record total in a WODI innings of 490/4 off 50 overs. The Women's Asia Cup saw a number of upsets occur. Bangladesh advanced to their first Asia Cup final after recording their first wins against India and Pakistan in WT20Is, and Thailand recorded their first victory over a Full Member nation after beating Sri Lanka. Bangladesh went on beat India in the final, to win their first Asia Cup title. In the first WT20I of the Women's T20 Tri-Series in England, New Zealand scored a new record total in a WT20I innings of 216/1 off 20 overs against South Africa. Later the same day, England broke the WT20I record, scoring 250/3, also against South Africa.

== Season overview ==
Men's international tours
Start date	Home team	Away team	Results [Matches]		
Start date	Home team	Away team	Test	ODI	T20I
11 May 2018	Ireland	Pakistan	0−1 [1]	—	—
24 May 2018	England	Pakistan	1−1 [2]	—	—
31 May 2018	(England) West Indies		—	—	1−0 [1]
3 June 2018	(India) Afghanistan	Bangladesh	—	—	3−0 [3]
6 June 2018	West Indies	Sri Lanka	1−1 [3]	—	—
10 June 2018	Scotland	England	—	1−0 [1]	—
12 June 2018	Scotland	Pakistan	—	—	0−2 [2]
13 June 2018	England	Australia	—	5−0 [5]	1−0 [1]
14 June 2018	India	Afghanistan	1−0 [1]	—	—
27 June 2018	Ireland	India	—	—	0−2 [2]
3 July 2018	England	India	4−1 [5]	2−1 [3]	1−2 [3]
4 July 2018	(United States) West Indies	Bangladesh	2–0 [2]	1−2 [3]	1–2 [3]
12 July 2018	Sri Lanka	South Africa	2−0 [2]	2−3 [5]	1−0 [1]
13 July 2018	Zimbabwe	Pakistan	—	0−5 [5]	—
29 July 2018	(England) Nepal	Netherlands	—	—	0−0 [1]
1 August 2018	Netherlands	Nepal	—	1−1 [2]	—
20 August 2018	Ireland	Afghanistan	—	1−2 [3]	0−2 [3]
Men's international tournaments
Start date	Tournament			Winners	
29 April 2018	(Malaysia) 2018 ICC World Cricket League Division Four			Uganda	
12 June 2018	2018 Netherlands Tri-Nation Series			Scotland	
1 July 2018	2018 Zimbabwe Tri-Nation Series			Pakistan	

Women's international tours
Start date	Home team	Away team	Results [Matches]		
Start date	Home team	Away team	WTest	WODI	WT20I
4 May 2018	South Africa	Bangladesh	—	5–0 [5]	3–0 [3]
6 June 2018	Ireland	New Zealand	—	0–3 [3]	0–1 [1]
9 June 2018	England	South Africa	—	2–1 [3]	—
28 June 2018	Ireland	Bangladesh	—	—	1−2 [3]
7 July 2018	England	New Zealand	—	2−1 [3]	—
Women's international tournaments
Start date	Tournament			Winners	
3 June 2018	(Malaysia) 2018 Women's Twenty20 Asia Cup			Bangladesh	
20 June 2018	2018 England women's Tri-Nation Series			England	
7 July 2018	(Netherlands) 2018 ICC Women's World Twenty20 Qualifier			Bangladesh	

== Rankings ==
The following are the rankings at the beginning of the season, following the ICC's annual re-weighting.

ICC Test Championship 1 May 2018
Rank	Team	Matches	Points	Rating
1	India	28	3499	125
2	South Africa	32	3589	112
3	Australia	33	3499	106
4	New Zealand	23	2354	102
5	England	36	3511	98
6	Sri Lanka	31	2914	94
7	Pakistan	17	1463	86
8	Bangladesh	16	1202	75
9	West Indies	22	1484	67
10	Zimbabwe	8	12	2

ICC ODI Championship 2 May 2018
Rank	Team	Matches	Points	Rating
1	England	42	5257	125
2	India	45	5492	122
3	South Africa	34	3842	113
4	New Zealand	41	4602	112
5	Australia	32	3327	104
6	Pakistan	32	3279	102
7	Bangladesh	24	2220	93
8	Sri Lanka	43	3302	77
9	West Indies	29	1989	69
10	Afghanistan	28	1758	63
11	Zimbabwe	37	2021	55
12	Ireland	20	766	38

ICC T20I Championship 2 May 2018
Rank	Team	Matches	Points	Rating
1	Pakistan	23	2990	130
2	Australia	15	1894	126
3	India	32	3932	123
4	New Zealand	22	2542	116
5	England	17	1951	115
6	South Africa	18	2058	114
7	West Indies	18	2048	114
8	Afghanistan	22	1917	87
9	Sri Lanka	27	2287	85
10	Bangladesh	21	1570	75
11	Scotland	9	592	66
12	Zimbabwe	14	817	58
13	Netherlands	8	421	53
14	United Arab Emirates	12	608	51
15	Hong Kong	10	420	42
16	Oman	7	270	39
17	Ireland	11	358	33

ICC Women's Rankings 12 April 2018
Rank	Team	Matches	Points	Rating
1	Australia	55	7284	132
2	England	49	6134	125
3	New Zealand	57	6900	121
4	India	62	7101	115
5	West Indies	48	4725	98
6	South Africa	62	5775	93
7	Pakistan	52	3920	75
8	Sri Lanka	52	3256	63
9	Bangladesh	19	704	37
10	Ireland	17	504	30

== April ==
=== 2018 ICC World Cricket League Division Four ===
Pos	Team	Pld	W	L	T	NR	Pts	NRR	Promotion or relegation
1	Uganda	5	4	1	0	0	8	1.175	Promoted to Division Three for 2018
2	Denmark	5	3	2	0	0	6	0.349	Promoted to Division Three for 2018
3	Malaysia	5	3	2	0	0	6	0.322	Relegated to ICC Cricket World Cup Challenge League
4	Jersey	5	2	3	0	0	4	0.044	Relegated to ICC Cricket World Cup Challenge League
5	Vanuatu	5	2	3	0	0	4	−0.677	Relegated to ICC Cricket World Cup Challenge League
6	Bermuda	5	1	4	0	0	2	−1.065	Relegated to ICC Cricket World Cup Challenge League

Group stage
No.	Date	Team 1	Captain 1	Team 2	Captain 2	Venue	Result
1st Match	29 April	Uganda	Roger Mukasa	Malaysia	Anwar Arudin	Kinrara Academy Oval, Bandar Kinrara	Malaysia by 9 runs
2nd Match	29 April	Denmark	Hamid Shah	Bermuda	Terryn Fray	Royal Selangor Club, Kuala Lumpur	Denmark by 8 wickets
3rd Match	29 April	Jersey	Charles Perchard	Vanuatu	Andrew Mansale	UKM Cricket Oval, Bandar Kinrara	Jersey by 7 wickets
4th Match	30 April	Malaysia	Anwar Arudin	Vanuatu	Andrew Mansale	Kinrara Academy Oval, Bandar Kinrara	Malaysia by 23 runs
5th Match	30 April	Denmark	Hamid Shah	Jersey	Charles Perchard	Royal Selangor Club, Kuala Lumpur	Denmark by 7 wickets (DLS)
6th Match	30 April	Uganda	Roger Mukasa	Bermuda	Terryn Fray	UKM Cricket Oval, Bandar Kinrara	Uganda by 189 runs
7th Match	2 May	Bermuda	Terryn Fray	Jersey	Charles Perchard	Kinrara Academy Oval, Bandar Kinrara	Bermuda by 58 runs
8th Match	2 May	Uganda	Roger Mukasa	Vanuatu	Andrew Mansale	Royal Selangor Club, Kuala Lumpur	Uganda by 81 runs
9th Match	2 May	Malaysia	Anwar Arudin	Denmark	Hamid Shah	UKM Cricket Oval, Bandar Kinrara	Denmark by 33 runs
10th Match	3 May	Uganda	Roger Mukasa	Denmark	Hamid Shah	Kinrara Academy Oval, Bandar Kinrara	Uganda by 1 run (DLS)
11th Match	3 May	Malaysia	Anwar Arudin	Jersey	Charles Perchard	Royal Selangor Club, Kuala Lumpur	Jersey by 10 runs (DLS)
12th Match	3 May	Bermuda	Terryn Fray	Vanuatu	Andrew Mansale	UKM Cricket Oval, Bandar Kinrara	Vanuatu by 4 wickets
13th Match	5 May	Denmark	Hamid Shah	Vanuatu	Andrew Mansale	Kinrara Academy Oval, Bandar Kinrara	Vanuatu by 5 wickets
14th Match	5 May	Malaysia	Anwar Arudin	Bermuda	Terryn Fray	Royal Selangor Club, Kuala Lumpur	No result
15th Match	5 May	Uganda	Roger Mukasa	Jersey	Charles Perchard	UKM Cricket Oval, Bandar Kinrara	No result
Replays
14th Match	6 May	Malaysia	Anwar Arudin	Bermuda	Terryn Fray	Kinrara Academy Oval, Kuala Lumpur	Malaysia by 89 runs
15th Match	6 May	Uganda	Roger Mukasa	Jersey	Charles Perchard	UKM Cricket Oval, Bandar Kinrara	Uganda by 7 runs

==== Final standings ====
Pos	Team	Status
1st	Uganda	Promoted to Division Three for 2018
2nd	Denmark	Promoted to Division Three for 2018
3rd	Malaysia	Remained in Division Four
4th	Jersey	Remained in Division Four
5th	Vanuatu	Relegated to Division Five
6th	Bermuda	Relegated to Division Five

== May ==
=== Bangladesh women in South Africa ===
WODI series
No.	Date	Home captain	Away captain	Venue	Result
WODI 1110	4 May	Dane van Niekerk	Rumana Ahmed	Senwes Park, Potchefstroom	South Africa by 106 runs
WODI 1111	6 May	Dane van Niekerk	Rumana Ahmed	Senwes Park, Potchefstroom	South Africa by 9 wickets
WODI 1112	9 May	Dane van Niekerk	Rumana Ahmed	Diamond Oval, Kimberley	South Africa by 9 wickets
WODI 1113	11 May	Chloe Tryon	Rumana Ahmed	Diamond Oval, Kimberley	South Africa by 154 runs
WODI 1114	14 May	Dane van Niekerk	Rumana Ahmed	Mangaung Oval, Bloemfontein	South Africa by 6 wickets
WT20I series
No.	Date	Home captain	Away captain	Venue	Result
WT20I 413	17 May	Chloe Tryon	Salma Khatun	Diamond Oval, Kimberley	South Africa by 17 runs
WT20I 414	19 May	Dane van Niekerk	Salma Khatun	Mangaung Oval, Bloemfontein	South Africa by 32 runs
WT20I 415	20 May	Dane van Niekerk	Salma Khatun	Mangaung Oval, Bloemfontein	South Africa by 23 runs

=== Pakistan in Ireland ===
Only Test
No.	Date	Home captain	Away captain	Venue	Result
Test 2303	11–15 May	William Porterfield	Sarfaraz Ahmed	The Village, Dublin	Pakistan by 5 wickets

=== Pakistan in England ===
Test series
No.	Date	Home captain	Away captain	Venue	Result
Test 2304	24–28 May	Joe Root	Sarfaraz Ahmed	Lord's, London	Pakistan by 9 wickets
Test 2305	1–5 June	Joe Root	Sarfaraz Ahmed	Headingley, Leeds	England by an innings and 55 runs

=== Hurricane Relief T20 Challenge ===
West Indies v World XI T20I
No.	Date	West Indies Captain	World XI Captain	Venue	Result
T20I 666	31 May	Carlos Brathwaite	Shahid Afridi	Lord's, London	West Indies by 72 runs

== June ==
=== Bangladesh vs Afghanistan in India ===
T20I series
No.	Date	Home captain	Away captain	Venue	Result
T20I 667	3 June	Asghar Stanikzai	Shakib Al Hasan	Rajiv Gandhi International Cricket Stadium, Dehradun	Afghanistan by 45 runs
T20I 668	5 June	Asghar Stanikzai	Shakib Al Hasan	Rajiv Gandhi International Cricket Stadium, Dehradun	Afghanistan by 6 wickets
T20I 669	7 June	Asghar Stanikzai	Shakib Al Hasan	Rajiv Gandhi International Cricket Stadium, Dehradun	Afghanistan by 1 run

=== 2018 Women's Twenty20 Asia Cup ===
Pos	Team	Pld	W	L	T	NR	Pts	NRR
1	India	5	4	1	0	0	8	2.446
2	Bangladesh	5	4	1	0	0	8	1.116
3	Pakistan	5	3	2	0	0	6	1.850
4	Sri Lanka	5	2	3	0	0	4	0.891
5	Thailand	5	2	3	0	0	4	−1.026
6	Malaysia	5	0	5	0	0	0	−5.302

Source: ESPNcricinfo

Group stage
No.	Date	Team 1	Captain 1	Team 2	Captain 2	Venue	Result
WT20I 416	3 June	India	Harmanpreet Kaur	Malaysia	Winifred Duraisingam	Kinrara Academy Oval, Kuala Lumpur	India by 142 runs
WT20I 417	3 June	Bangladesh	Salma Khatun	Sri Lanka	Shashikala Siriwardene	Royal Selangor Club, Kuala Lumpur	Sri Lanka by 6 wickets
WT20I 418	3 June	Pakistan	Bismah Maroof	Thailand	Sornnarin Tippoch	Kinrara Academy Oval, Kuala Lumpur	Pakistan by 8 wickets
WT20I 419	4 June	Bangladesh	Salma Khatun	Pakistan	Bismah Maroof	Kinrara Academy Oval, Kuala Lumpur	Bangladesh by 7 wickets
WT20I 420	4 June	India	Harmanpreet Kaur	Thailand	Sornnarin Tippoch	Royal Selangor Club, Kuala Lumpur	India by 66 runs
WT20I 421	4 June	Sri Lanka	Shashikala Siriwardene	Malaysia	Winifred Duraisingam	Royal Selangor Club, Kuala Lumpur	Sri Lanka by 90 runs
WT20I 422	6 June	Pakistan	Bismah Maroof	Sri Lanka	Shashikala Siriwardene	Kinrara Academy Oval, Kuala Lumpur	Pakistan by 23 runs
WT20I 423	6 June	Thailand	Sornnarin Tippoch	Malaysia	Winifred Duraisingam	Royal Selangor Club, Kuala Lumpur	Thailand by 9 wickets
WT20I 424	6 June	India	Harmanpreet Kaur	Bangladesh	Salma Khatun	Kinrara Academy Oval, Kuala Lumpur	Bangladesh by 7 wickets
WT20I 426	7 June	Bangladesh	Salma Khatun	Thailand	Sornnarin Tippoch	Kinrara Academy Oval, Kuala Lumpur	Bangladesh by 9 wickets
WT20I 427	7 June	Pakistan	Bismah Maroof	Malaysia	Winifred Duraisingam	Royal Selangor Club, Kuala Lumpur	Pakistan by 147 runs
WT20I 428	7 June	India	Harmanpreet Kaur	Sri Lanka	Shashikala Siriwardene	Royal Selangor Club, Kuala Lumpur	India by 7 wickets
WT20I 429	9 June	India	Harmanpreet Kaur	Pakistan	Bismah Maroof	Kinrara Academy Oval, Kuala Lumpur	India by 7 wickets
WT20I 430	9 June	Sri Lanka	Shashikala Siriwardene	Thailand	Sornnarin Tippoch	Royal Selangor Club, Kuala Lumpur	Thailand by 4 wickets
WT20I 431	9 June	Bangladesh	Salma Khatun	Malaysia	Winifred Duraisingam	Kinrara Academy Oval, Kuala Lumpur	Bangladesh by 70 runs
Final
WT20I 432	10 June	India	Harmanpreet Kaur	Bangladesh	Salma Khatun	Kinrara Academy Oval, Kuala Lumpur	Bangladesh by 3 wickets

=== Sri Lanka in West Indies ===
Sobers–Tissera Trophy Test series
No.	Date	Home captain	Away captain	Venue	Result
Test 2306	6–10 June	Jason Holder	Dinesh Chandimal	Queen's Park Oval, Port of Spain	West Indies by 226 runs
Test 2308	14–18 June	Jason Holder	Dinesh Chandimal	Daren Sammy Cricket Ground, Gros Islet	Match drawn
Test 2309	23–27 June	Jason Holder	Suranga Lakmal	Kensington Oval, Bridgetown	Sri Lanka by 4 wickets

=== New Zealand women in Ireland ===
Only WT20I
No.	Date	Home captain	Away captain	Venue	Result
WT20I 425	6 June	Laura Delany	Suzie Bates	YMCA Cricket Club, Dublin	New Zealand by 10 wickets
WODI series
No.	Date	Home captain	Away captain	Venue	Result
WODI 1115	8 June	Laura Delany	Suzie Bates	YMCA Cricket Club, Dublin	New Zealand by 346 runs
WODI 1117	10 June	Laura Delany	Amy Satterthwaite	The Hills Cricket Club, Dublin	New Zealand by 306 runs
WODI 1119	13 June	Laura Delany	Suzie Bates	Clontarf Cricket Club, Dublin	New Zealand by 305 runs

=== South Africa women in England ===
2017–20 ICC Women's Championship – WODI series
No.	Date	Home captain	Away captain	Venue	Result
WODI 1116	9 June	Heather Knight	Dane van Niekerk	New Road, Worcester	South Africa by 7 wickets
WODI 1118	12 June	Heather Knight	Dane van Niekerk	County Cricket Ground, Hove	England by 69 runs
WODI 1120	15 June	Heather Knight	Dane van Niekerk	St Lawrence Ground, Canterbury	England by 7 wickets

=== England in Scotland ===
Only ODI
No.	Date	Home captain	Away captain	Venue	Result
ODI 4008	10 June	Kyle Coetzer	Eoin Morgan	The Grange Club, Edinburgh	Scotland by 6 runs

=== 2018 Netherlands Tri-Nation Series ===
Pos	Team	Pld	W	L	T	NR	Pts	NRR
1	Scotland	4	2	1	1	0	5	1.148
2	Netherlands	4	2	2	0	0	4	−1.553
3	Ireland	4	1	2	1	0	3	0.410

Tri-series
No.	Date	Team 1	Captain 1	Team 2	Captain 2	Venue	Result
T20I 670	12 June	Netherlands	Pieter Seelaar	Ireland	Gary Wilson	Hazelaarweg Stadion, Rotterdam	Netherlands by 4 runs
T20I 672	13 June	Netherlands	Pieter Seelaar	Ireland	Gary Wilson	Hazelaarweg Stadion, Rotterdam	Netherlands by 4 wickets
T20I 674	16 June	Ireland	Gary Wilson	Scotland	Kyle Coetzer	Sportpark Het Schootsveld, Deventer	Ireland by 46 runs
T20I 675	17 June	Ireland	Gary Wilson	Scotland	Kyle Coetzer	Sportpark Het Schootsveld, Deventer	Match tied
T20I 676	19 June	Netherlands	Pieter Seelaar	Scotland	Kyle Coetzer	VRA Cricket Ground, Amstelveen	Scotland by 7 wickets
T20I 677	20 June	Netherlands	Pieter Seelaar	Scotland	Kyle Coetzer	VRA Cricket Ground, Amstelveen	Scotland by 115 runs

=== Pakistan in Scotland ===
T20I series
No.	Date	Home captain	Away captain	Venue	Result
T20I 671	12 June	Kyle Coetzer	Sarfaraz Ahmed	The Grange Club, Edinburgh	Pakistan by 48 runs
T20I 673	13 June	Kyle Coetzer	Sarfaraz Ahmed	The Grange Club, Edinburgh	Pakistan by 84 runs

=== Australia in England ===
ODI series
No.	Date	Home captain	Away captain	Venue	Result
ODI 4009	13 June	Eoin Morgan	Tim Paine	The Oval, London	England by 3 wickets
ODI 4010	16 June	Jos Buttler	Tim Paine	Sophia Gardens, Cardiff	England by 38 runs
ODI 4011	19 June	Eoin Morgan	Tim Paine	Trent Bridge, Nottingham	England by 242 runs
ODI 4012	21 June	Eoin Morgan	Tim Paine	Riverside Ground, Chester-le-Street	England by 6 wickets
ODI 4013	24 June	Eoin Morgan	Tim Paine	Old Trafford, Manchester	England by 1 wicket
Only T20I
No.	Date	Home captain	Away captain	Venue	Result
T20I 679	27 June	Eoin Morgan	Aaron Finch	Edgbaston, Birmingham	England by 28 runs

=== Afghanistan in India ===
Only Test
No.	Date	Home captain	Away captain	Venue	Result
Test 2307	14–18 June	Ajinkya Rahane	Asghar Stanikzai	M. Chinnaswamy Stadium, Bengaluru	India by an innings and 262 runs

=== 2018 England women's Tri-Nation Series ===
Pos	Team	Pld	W	L	T	NR	Pts	NRR
1	England	4	3	1	0	0	6	2.571
2	New Zealand	4	2	2	0	0	4	0.238
3	South Africa	4	1	3	0	0	2	−2.855

WT20I Tri-series
No.	Date	Team 1	Captain 1	Team 2	Captain 2	Venue	Result
WT20I 433	20 June	South Africa	Dane van Niekerk	New Zealand	Suzie Bates	County Ground, Taunton	New Zealand by 66 runs
WT20I 434	20 June	England	Heather Knight	South Africa	Dane van Niekerk	County Ground, Taunton	England by 121 runs
WT20I 435	23 June	England	Heather Knight	South Africa	Dane van Niekerk	County Ground, Taunton	South Africa by 6 wickets
WT20I 436	23 June	England	Heather Knight	New Zealand	Suzie Bates	County Ground, Taunton	England by 54 runs
WT20I 437	28 June	South Africa	Dane van Niekerk	New Zealand	Suzie Bates	County Ground, Bristol	New Zealand by 8 wickets
WT20I 439	28 June	England	Heather Knight	New Zealand	Suzie Bates	County Ground, Bristol	England by 7 wickets
Final
WT20I 442	1 July	England	Heather Knight	New Zealand	Suzie Bates	County Cricket Ground, Chelmsford	England by 7 wickets

=== India in Ireland ===
T20I series
No.	Date	Home captain	Away captain	Venue	Result
T20I 678	27 June	Gary Wilson	Virat Kohli	The Village, Dublin	India by 76 runs
T20I 680	29 June	Gary Wilson	Virat Kohli	The Village, Dublin	India by 143 runs

=== Bangladesh women in Ireland ===
WT20I series
No.	Date	Home captain	Away captain	Venue	Result
WT20I 438	28 June	Laura Delany	Salma Khatun	YMCA Cricket Club, Dublin	Bangladesh by 4 wickets
WT20I 440	29 June	Laura Delany	Salma Khatun	The Village, Malahide	Bangladesh by 4 wickets
WT20I 441	1 July	Laura Delany	Salma Khatun	Sydney Parade, Dublin	Ireland by 6 wickets

== July ==
=== 2018 Zimbabwe Tri-Nation Series ===
Pos	Team	Pld	W	L	T	NR	Pts	NRR
1	Australia	4	3	1	0	0	12	1.809
2	Pakistan	4	3	1	0	0	12	0.707
3	Zimbabwe	4	0	4	0	0	0	−2.340

Tri-series
No.	Date	Team 1	Captain 1	Team 2	Captain 2	Venue	Result
T20I 681	1 July	Zimbabwe	Hamilton Masakadza	Pakistan	Sarfaraz Ahmed	Harare Sports Club, Harare	Pakistan by 74 runs
T20I 682	2 July	Australia	Aaron Finch	Pakistan	Sarfaraz Ahmed	Harare Sports Club, Harare	Australia by 9 wickets
T20I 683	3 July	Zimbabwe	Hamilton Masakadza	Australia	Aaron Finch	Harare Sports Club, Harare	Australia by 100 runs
T20I 685	4 July	Zimbabwe	Hamilton Masakadza	Pakistan	Sarfaraz Ahmed	Harare Sports Club, Harare	Pakistan by 7 wickets
T20I 686	5 July	Australia	Aaron Finch	Pakistan	Sarfaraz Ahmed	Harare Sports Club, Harare	Pakistan by 45 runs
T20I 687	6 July	Zimbabwe	Hamilton Masakadza	Australia	Aaron Finch	Harare Sports Club, Harare	Australia by 5 wickets
Final
T20I 689	8 July	Australia	Aaron Finch	Pakistan	Sarfaraz Ahmed	Harare Sports Club, Harare	Pakistan by 6 wickets

=== India in England ===
T20I series
No.	Date	Home captain	Away captain	Venue	Result
T20I 684	3 July	Eoin Morgan	Virat Kohli	Old Trafford, Manchester	India by 8 wickets
T20I 688	6 July	Eoin Morgan	Virat Kohli	Sophia Gardens, Cardiff	England by 5 wickets
T20I 690	8 July	Eoin Morgan	Virat Kohli	Bristol County Ground, Bristol	India by 7 wickets
ODI series
No.	Date	Home captain	Away captain	Venue	Result
ODI 4014	12 July	Eoin Morgan	Virat Kohli	Trent Bridge, Nottingham	India by 8 wickets
ODI 4016	14 July	Eoin Morgan	Virat Kohli	Lord's, London	England by 86 runs
ODI 4018	17 July	Eoin Morgan	Virat Kohli	Headingley, Leeds	England by 8 wickets
Test series
No.	Date	Home captain	Away captain	Venue	Result
Test 2314	1–5 August	Joe Root	Virat Kohli	Edgbaston, Birmingham	England by 31 runs
Test 2315	9–13 August	Joe Root	Virat Kohli	Lord's, London	England by an innings and 159 runs
Test 2316	18–22 August	Joe Root	Virat Kohli	Trent Bridge, Nottingham	India by 203 runs
Test 2317	30 August – 3 September	Joe Root	Virat Kohli	Rose Bowl, Southampton	England by 60 runs
Test 2318	7–11 September	Joe Root	Virat Kohli	The Oval, London	England by 118 runs

=== Bangladesh in West Indies and United States ===
Test series
No.	Date	Home captain	Away captain	Venue	Result
Test 2310	4–8 July	Jason Holder	Shakib Al Hasan	Sir Vivian Richards Stadium, North Sound	West Indies by an innings and 219 runs
Test 2312	12–16 July	Jason Holder	Shakib Al Hasan	Sabina Park, Kingston	West Indies by 166 runs
ODI series
No.	Date	Home captain	Away captain	Venue	Result
ODI 4022	22 July	Jason Holder	Mashrafe Mortaza	Providence Stadium, Providence	Bangladesh by 48 runs
ODI 4023	25 July	Jason Holder	Mashrafe Mortaza	Providence Stadium, Providence	West Indies by 3 runs
ODI 4024	28 July	Jason Holder	Mashrafe Mortaza	Warner Park, Basseterre	Bangladesh by 18 runs
T20I series
No.	Date	Home captain	Away captain	Venue	Result
T20I 692	31 July	Carlos Brathwaite	Shakib Al Hasan	Warner Park, Basseterre	West Indies by 7 wickets (DLS)
T20I 693	4 August	Carlos Brathwaite	Shakib Al Hasan	Central Broward Regional Park, Lauderhill	Bangladesh by 12 runs
T20I 694	5 August	Carlos Brathwaite	Shakib Al Hasan	Central Broward Regional Park, Lauderhill	Bangladesh by 19 runs (DLS)

=== 2018 ICC Women's World Twenty20 Qualifier ===
Pos	Team	Pld	W	L	T	NR	Pts	NRR
1	Bangladesh	3	3	0	0	0	6	3.013
2	Papua New Guinea	3	2	1	0	0	4	0.332
3	United Arab Emirates	3	1	2	0	0	2	−1.235
4	Netherlands	3	0	3	0	0	0	−2.147

Pos	Team	Pld	W	L	T	NR	Pts	NRR
1	Ireland	3	3	0	0	0	6	1.669
2	Scotland	3	2	1	0	0	4	1.359
3	Uganda	3	1	2	0	0	2	−1.699
4	Thailand	3	0	3	0	0	0	−0.917

Group stage
No.	Date	Team 1	Captain 1	Team 2	Captain 2	Venue	Result
WT20I 443	7 July	Ireland	Laura Delany	Thailand	Sornnarin Tippoch	Kampong Cricket Club, Utrecht	Ireland by 7 wickets
WT20I 444	7 July	Scotland	Kathryn Bryce	Uganda	Kevin Awino	VRA Cricket Ground, Amstelveen	Scotland by 9 wickets
WT20I 445	7 July	Netherlands	Heather Siegers	United Arab Emirates	Humaira Tasneem	Kampong Cricket Club, Utrecht	United Arab Emirates by 6 wickets
WT20I 446	7 July	Bangladesh	Salma Khatun	Papua New Guinea	Pauke Siaka	VRA Cricket Ground, Amstelveen	Bangladesh by 8 wickets
WT20I 447	8 July	Uganda	Kevin Awino	Thailand	Sornnarin Tippoch	Kampong Cricket Club, Utrecht	Uganda by 4 wickets
WT20I 448	8 July	Scotland	Kathryn Bryce	Ireland	Laura Delany	VRA Cricket Ground, Amstelveen	Ireland by 9 wickets
WT20I 449	8 July	Netherlands	Heather Siegers	Bangladesh	Salma Khatun	Kampong Cricket Club, Utrecht	Bangladesh by 7 wickets
WT20I 450	8 July	Papua New Guinea	Pauke Siaka	United Arab Emirates	Humaira Tasneem	VRA Cricket Ground, Amstelveen	Papua New Guinea by 2 wickets
WT20I 451	10 July	Thailand	Sornnarin Tippoch	Scotland	Kathryn Bryce	Kampong Cricket Club, Utrecht	Scotland by 27 runs
WT20I 452	10 July	Ireland	Laura Delany	Uganda	Kevin Awino	VRA Cricket Ground, Amstelveen	Ireland by 8 wickets
WT20I 453	10 July	United Arab Emirates	Humaira Tasneem	Bangladesh	Salma Khatun	Kampong Cricket Club, Utrecht	Bangladesh by 8 wickets
WT20I 454	10 July	Netherlands	Heather Siegers	Papua New Guinea	Pauke Siaka	VRA Cricket Ground, Amstelveen	Papua New Guinea by 44 runs
Semi Finals
WT20I 455	12 July	Ireland	Laura Delany	Papua New Guinea	Kaia Arua	VRA Cricket Ground, Amstelveen	Ireland by 27 runs
WT20I 456	12 July	Uganda	Kevin Awino	Netherlands	Heather Siegers	Kampong Cricket Club, Utrecht	Uganda by 6 wickets
WT20I 457	12 July	Bangladesh	Salma Khatun	Scotland	Kathryn Bryce	VRA Cricket Ground, Amstelveen	Bangladesh by 49 runs
WT20I 458	12 July	Thailand	Sornnarin Tippoch	United Arab Emirates	Humaira Tasneem	Kampong Cricket Club, Utrecht	Thailand by 7 wickets
Playoff Matches
WT20I 459	14 July	Netherlands	Heather Siegers	United Arab Emirates	Humaira Tasneem	VRA Cricket Ground, Amstelveen	Match tied (United Arab Emirates won S/O)
WT20I 461	14 July	Uganda	Kevin Awino	Thailand	Sornnarin Tippoch	VRA Cricket Ground, Amstelveen	Thailand by 34 runs
WT20I 460	14 July	Papua New Guinea	Kaia Arua	Scotland	Kathryn Bryce	Kampong Cricket Club, Utrecht	Scotland by 10 wickets
WT20I 462	14 July	Ireland	Laura Delany	Bangladesh	Salma Khatun	Kampong Cricket Club, Utrecht	Bangladesh by 25 runs

==== Final standings ====
Position	Team
1st	Bangladesh
2nd	Ireland
3rd	Scotland
4th	Papua New Guinea
5th	Thailand
6th	Uganda
7th	United Arab Emirates
8th	Netherlands

Qualified for the 2018 World Twenty20.

=== New Zealand women in England ===
2017–20 ICC Women's Championship – WODI series
No.	Date	Home captain	Away captain	Venue	Result
WODI 1121	7 July	Heather Knight	Suzie Bates	Headingley, Leeds	England by 142 runs
WODI 1122	10 July	Heather Knight	Suzie Bates	County Cricket Ground, Derby	England by 123 runs
WODI 1123	13 July	Heather Knight	Suzie Bates	Grace Road, Leicester	New Zealand by 4 wickets

=== South Africa in Sri Lanka ===
Test series
No.	Date	Home captain	Away captain	Venue	Result
Test 2311	12–16 July	Suranga Lakmal	Faf du Plessis	Galle International Stadium, Galle	Sri Lanka by 278 runs
Test 2313	20–24 July	Suranga Lakmal	Faf du Plessis	Sinhalese Sports Club Ground, Colombo	Sri Lanka by 199 runs
ODI series
No.	Date	Home captain	Away captain	Venue	Result
ODI 4025	29 July	Angelo Mathews	Faf du Plessis	Rangiri Dambulla International Stadium, Dambulla	South Africa by 5 wickets
ODI 4027	1 August	Angelo Mathews	Faf du Plessis	Rangiri Dambulla International Stadium, Dambulla	South Africa by 4 wickets
ODI 4029	5 August	Angelo Mathews	Faf du Plessis	Pallekele International Cricket Stadium, Kandy	South Africa by 78 runs
ODI 4030	8 August	Angelo Mathews	Quinton de Kock	Pallekele International Cricket Stadium, Kandy	Sri Lanka by 3 runs (DLS)
ODI 4031	12 August	Angelo Mathews	Quinton de Kock	R. Premadasa International Cricket Stadium, Colombo	Sri Lanka by 178 runs
Only T20I
No.	Date	Home captain	Away captain	Venue	Result
T20I 695	14 August	Angelo Mathews	JP Duminy	R. Premadasa International Cricket Stadium, Colombo	Sri Lanka by 3 wickets

=== Pakistan in Zimbabwe ===
ODI series
No.	Date	Home captain	Away captain	Venue	Result
ODI 4015	13 July	Hamilton Masakadza	Sarfaraz Ahmed	Queens Sports Club, Bulawayo	Pakistan by 201 runs
ODI 4017	16 July	Hamilton Masakadza	Sarfaraz Ahmed	Queens Sports Club, Bulawayo	Pakistan by 9 wickets
ODI 4019	18 July	Hamilton Masakadza	Sarfaraz Ahmed	Queens Sports Club, Bulawayo	Pakistan by 9 wickets
ODI 4020	20 July	Hamilton Masakadza	Sarfaraz Ahmed	Queens Sports Club, Bulawayo	Pakistan by 244 runs
ODI 4021	22 July	Hamilton Masakadza	Sarfaraz Ahmed	Queens Sports Club, Bulawayo	Pakistan by 131 runs

=== 2018 MCC Tri-Nation Series ===
Nepal v Netherlands
No.	Date	Nepal Captain	Netherlands Captain	Venue	Result
T20I 691	29 July	Paras Khadka	Pieter Seelaar	Lord's, London	No result

== August ==
=== Nepal in Netherlands ===
ODI series
No.	Date	Home captain	Away captain	Venue	Result
ODI 4026	1 August	Pieter Seelaar	Paras Khadka	VRA Cricket Ground, Amstelveen	Netherlands by 55 runs
ODI 4028	3 August	Pieter Seelaar	Paras Khadka	VRA Cricket Ground, Amstelveen	Nepal by 1 run

=== Afghanistan in Ireland ===
T20I series
No.	Date	Home captain	Away captain	Venue	Result
T20I 696	20 August	Gary Wilson	Asghar Afghan	Bready Cricket Club Ground, Magheramason	Afghanistan by 16 runs
T20I 697	22 August	Gary Wilson	Asghar Afghan	Bready Cricket Club Ground, Magheramason	Afghanistan by 81 runs
T20I 697a	24 August	Gary Wilson	Asghar Afghan	Bready Cricket Club Ground, Magheramason	Match abandoned
ODI series
No.	Date	Home captain	Away captain	Venue	Result
ODI 4032	27 August	William Porterfield	Asghar Afghan	Stormont Cricket Ground, Belfast	Afghanistan by 29 runs
ODI 4033	29 August	William Porterfield	Asghar Afghan	Stormont Cricket Ground, Belfast	Ireland by 3 wickets
ODI 4035	31 August	William Porterfield	Asghar Afghan	Stormont Cricket Ground, Belfast	Afghanistan by 8 wickets

== See also ==
- Associate international cricket in 2018
- International cricket in 2018–19
- Associate international cricket in 2018–19
