= Zintle Mali =

South African cricketer

Personal information
- Full name: Zintle Nomtha Mali
- Born: 21 January 1994 (age 32); Alice, Eastern Cape, South Africa
- Batting: Right-handed
- Bowling: Right-arm medium
- Role: bowler

International information
- National side: South Africa (2018–2019)
- ODI debut (cap 81): 9 May 2018 v Bangladesh
- Last ODI: 11 February 2019 v Sri Lanka
- T20I debut (cap 48): 20 May 2018 v Bangladesh
- Last T20I: 18 November 2018 v Bangladesh

Domestic team information
- Years: Team
- 2012/13–2020/21: Border
- 2021/22–2022/23: North West
- 2023/24–present: KwaZulu-Natal Coastal

Career statistics
Competition	WODI	WT20I
Matches	7	9
Runs scored	3	2
Batting average	3.00	–
100s/50s	0/0	0/0
Top score	2	2*
Balls bowled	132	153
Wickets	4	6
Bowling average	20.25	35.00
5 wickets in innings	0	0
10 wickets in match	0	0
Best bowling	2/11	2/24
Catches/stumpings	1/–	1/–
- Source: Cricinfo, 16 February 2019

Zintle Nomtha Mali (born 21 January 1994) is a South African cricketer. In April 2018, she was named in the South Africa Women's squad for their series against Bangladesh Women. She made her Women's One Day International cricket (WODI) debut for South Africa against Bangladesh Women on 9 May 2018. She made her WT20I debut for South Africa against Bangladesh Women on 20 May 2018.

In October 2018, she was named in South Africa's squad for the 2018 ICC Women's World Twenty20 tournament in the West Indies. In February 2019, Cricket South Africa named her as one of the players in the Powerade Women's National Academy intake for 2019. In September 2019, she was named in the M van der Merwe XI squad for the inaugural edition of the Women's T20 Super League in South Africa. On 23 July 2020, Mali was named in South Africa's 24-woman squad to begin training in Pretoria, ahead of their tour to England.
