= Bangladesh women's cricket team in South Africa in 2018 =

International cricket tour

	South Africa women	Bangladesh women
- Dates: 2 – 20 May 2018
Captains	Dane van Niekerk (Note: Chloe Tryon captained South Africa Women for the fourth WODI and the first WT20I.)	Rumana Ahmed (WODIs); Salma Khatun (WT20Is)

One Day International series
- Results: South Africa women won the 5-match series 5–0
Most runs	Lizelle Lee (244)	Fargana Hoque (91)
Most wickets	Raisibe Ntozakhe (8)	Nahida Akter (5)
- Player of the series: Lizelle Lee (SA)

Twenty20 International series
- Results: South Africa women won the 3-match series 3–0
Most runs	Suné Luus (104)	Fargana Hoque (74)
Most wickets	Shabnim Ismail (5)	Rumana Ahmed (3); Salma Khatun (3); Khadija Tul Kubra (3)
- Player of the series: Shabnim Ismail (SA)

The visiting Bangladesh women's cricket team played against the South Africa women's cricket team in May 2018. The tour consisted of five Women's One Day Internationals (WODIs) and three Women's Twenty20 Internationals (WT20Is). Prior to the tour, the Bangladesh Cricket Board (BCB) named a preliminary 30-player squad for a 15-day preparation camp.

South Africa Women won the WODI series 5–0 and the WT20I series 3–0.

== Squads ==
WODIs		WT20Is	
South Africa	Bangladesh	South Africa	Bangladesh
Dane van Niekerk (c); Trisha Chetty; Shabnim Ismail; Marizanne Kapp; Ayabonga Khaka; Masabata Klaas; Lizelle Lee; Suné Luus; Zintle Mali; Raisibe Ntozakhe; Mignon du Preez; Andrie Steyn; Chloe Tryon; Laura Wolvaardt	Rumana Ahmed (c); Nahida Akter; Jahanara Alam; Suraiya Azmin; Jannatul Ferdus; Panna Ghosh; Fargana Hoque; Sanjida Islam; Fahima Khatun; Murshida Khatun; Salma Khatun; Khadija Tul Kubra; Sobhana Mostary; Nigar Sultana; Shamima Sultana; Sharmin Sultana	Dane van Niekerk (c); Tazmin Brits; Shabnim Ismail; Marizanne Kapp; Ayabonga Khaka; Masabata Klaas; Stacy Lackay; Lizelle Lee; Suné Luus; Zintle Mali; Raisibe Ntozakhe; Mignon du Preez; Chloe Tryon; Laura Wolvaardt	Salma Khatun (c); Rumana Ahmed; Nahida Akter; Jahanara Alam; Suraiya Azmin; Jannatul Ferdus; Panna Ghosh; Fargana Hoque; Sanjida Islam; Fahima Khatun; Murshida Khatun; Khadija Tul Kubra; Sobhana Mostary; Nigar Sultana; Shamima Sultana; Sharmin Sultana

== Tour match ==
=== 50 overs match: Bangladesh Women vs North West Women ===
2 May 2018
09:45
Scorecard

Bangladesh; 270/2 (50 overs)	v	North West Women; 180 (45.4 overs)
Rumana Ahmed 136* (144); Anneke Bosch 1/31 (10 overs)		Elrisa Fourie 64 (66); Fahima Khatun 8/5 (10 overs)

Bangladesh Women won by 90 runs
North-West University No1 Ground, Potchefstroom
Umpires: Shaun George (SA) and Bongani Jele (SA)

- Bangladesh Women won the toss and elected to bat.
- 12 players per side (11 batting, 11 fielding).

== WODI series ==
=== 1st WODI ===
4 May 2018
09:45
Scorecard

South Africa; 270/9 (50 overs)	v	Bangladesh; 164 (49.3 overs)
Chloe Tryon 65 (42); Nahida Akter 2/22 (8 overs)		Fargana Hoque 69 (146); Dane van Niekerk 3/23 (10 overs)

South Africa Women won by 106 runs
Senwes Park, Potchefstroom
Umpires: Shaun George (SA) and Bongani Jele (SA)
Player of the match: Chloe Tryon (SA)

- South Africa Women won the toss and elected to bat.
- Murshida Khatun (Ban) made her WODI debut.

=== 2nd WODI ===
6 May 2018
09:45
Scorecard

Bangladesh; 89 (39.5 overs)	v	South Africa; 90/1 (17.1 overs)
Panna Ghosh 20* (54); Ayabonga Khaka 3/13 (6 overs)		Laura Wolvaardt 37* (50); Salma Khatun 1/19 (4 overs)

South Africa Women won by 9 wickets
Senwes Park, Potchefstroom
Umpires: Adrian Holdstock (SA) and Bongani Jele (SA)
Player of the match: Ayabonga Khaka (SA)

- Bangladesh Women won the toss and elected to bat.
- Jannatul Ferdus (Ban) made her WODI debut.
- Ayabonga Khaka (SA) took her 50th wickets in WODIs.

=== 3rd WODI ===
9 May 2018
09:45
Scorecard

Bangladesh; 71 (36.5 overs)	v	South Africa; 72/1 (14.2 overs)
Nigar Sultana 33* (97); Ayabonga Khaka 3/16 (6.5 overs)		Lizelle Lee 44* (51); Nahida Akter 1/19 (4.2 overs)

South Africa Women won by 9 wickets
Diamond Oval, Kimberley
Umpires: Shaun George (SA) and Adrian Holdstock (SA)
Player of the match: Lizelle Lee (SA)

- South Africa Women won the toss and elected to field.
- Zintle Mali (SA) made her WODI debut.

=== 4th WODI ===
11 May 2018
09:45
Scorecard

South Africa; 230/7 (50 overs)	v	Bangladesh; 76 (33.2 overs)
Lizelle Lee 70 (102); Nahida Akter 2/36 (9 overs)		Fargana Hoque 22 (48); Shabnim Ismail 2/8 (7 overs)

South Africa Women won by 154 runs
Diamond Oval, Kimberley
Umpires: Shaun George (SA) and Bongani Jele (SA)
Player of the match: Chloe Tryon (SA)

- South Africa Women won the toss and elected to bat.
- Lizelle Lee became the third player for South Africa Women to score 2,000 runs in WODIs.

=== 5th WODI ===
14 May 2018
09:45
Scorecard

Bangladesh; 166/9 (50 overs)	v	South Africa; 169/4 (35 overs)
Rumana Ahmed 74 (123); Shabnim Ismail 3/17 (9 overs)		Laura Wolvaardt 70* (96); Khadija Tul Kubra 3/33 (10 overs)

South Africa Women won by 6 wickets
Mangaung Oval, Bloemfontein
Umpires: Shaun George (SA) and Adrian Holdstock (SA)
Player of the match: Laura Wolvaardt (SA)

- South Africa Women won the toss and elected to field.
- Sobhana Mostary (Ban) made her WODI debut.

== WT20I series ==
=== 1st WT20I ===
17 May 2018
13:00
Scorecard

South Africa; 127/6 (20 overs)	v	Bangladesh; 110/5 (20 overs)
Lizelle Lee 46 (38); Khadija Tul Kubra 3/23 (4 overs)		Rumana Ahmed 36 (41); Shabnim Ismail 3/19 (4 overs)

South Africa Women won by 17 runs
Diamond Oval, Kimberley
Umpires: Adrian Holdstock (SA) and Bongani Jele (SA)

- South Africa Women won the toss and elected to bat.
- Stacy Lackay (SA) made her WT20I debut.

=== 2nd WT20I ===
19 May 2018
13:00
Scorecard

South Africa; 169/4 (20 overs)	v	Bangladesh; 137/5 (20 overs)
Suné Luus 71 (57); Nahida Akter 2/32 (4 overs); Panna Ghosh 2/32 (4 overs)		Shamima Sultana 50 (43); Shabnim Ismail 2/29 (4 overs)

South Africa Women won by 32 runs
Mangaung Oval, Bloemfontein
Umpires: Shaun George (SA) and Bongani Jele (SA)
Player of the match: Dane van Niekerk (SA)

- Bangladesh Women won the toss and elected to field.
- Tazmin Brits (SA) made her WT20I debut.

=== 3rd WT20I ===
20 May 2018
13:00
Scorecard

South Africa; 64/4 (9 overs)	v	Bangladesh; 41/6 (9 overs)
Tazmin Brits 29 (22); Salma Khatun 2/18 (2 overs)		Shamima Sultana 12 (17); Ayabonga Khaka 3/10 (2 overs)

South Africa Women won by 23 runs
Mangaung Oval, Bloemfontein
Umpires: Shaun George (SA) and Adrian Holdstock (SA)
Player of the match: Ayabonga Khaka (SA)

- Bangladesh Women won the toss and elected to field.
- The match was reduced to 9 overs per side due to rain.
- Zintle Mali (SA), Jannatul Ferdus and Murshida Khatun (Ban) all made their WT20I debuts.
