= 2019–20 CSA 3-Day Provincial Cup =

Cricket tournament

- Dates: 3 October 2019 – 5 April 2020
- Administrator: Cricket South Africa
- Cricket format: First-class
- Tournament format: Round-robin
- Champions: Easterns; KwaZulu-Natal
- Participants: 13
- Most runs: Mathew Christensen (776)
- Most wickets: Clayton August (39)

The 2019–20 CSA 3-Day Provincial Cup was a first-class cricket competition that took place in South Africa from October 2019 to April 2020. On 16 March 2020, Cricket South Africa suspended all cricket in the country for 60 days due to the COVID-19 pandemic. On 24 March 2020, Easterns and KwaZulu-Natal were named as the joint-winners of the tournament. KwaZulu-Natal finished top of group B, with Easterns named joint-winners despite not topping their group, but played one match fewer than other teams, with their victory coming via an average points calculation. This was following the recommendations made by Graeme Smith, the acting Director of Cricket.

The competition was played between the thirteen South African provincial teams. In previous editions of the competition, Namibia had also competed, but they withdrew ahead of the start of the previous tournament, citing issues around costs and logistics.

Unlike its counterpart, the CSA Franchise 4-Day Cup, the matches were three days in length instead of four. The tournament was played in parallel with the 2019–20 CSA Provincial One-Day Challenge, a List A competition which featured the same teams. Eastern Province and Northerns were the defending champions, after the title was shared.

On 17 October 2019, in the match between Gauteng and Boland, Lauren Agenbag became the first woman to stand as an on-field umpire in a first-class cricket match in South Africa. In January 2020, Andrea Agathangelou and Yaseen Valli made an opening partnership of 485 runs for Easterns against Boland, breaking the previous record in a first-class match in South Africa of 424 runs set in the 1926–27 season.

== Points table ==
Pool A

Team	Pld	W	L	D	NR	Pts
Eastern Province	10	3	1	6	0	153.66
Easterns	9	2	0	7	0	138.46
Free State	9	2	1	5	1	125.86
Gauteng	9	1	1	7	0	119.90
KwaZulu-Natal Inland	10	1	1	7	1	107.18
Boland	9	1	3	5	0	93.66

Pool B

Team	Pld	W	L	D	NR	Pts
KwaZulu-Natal	9	5	2	1	1	145.42
Northerns	9	2	0	7	0	138.13
Northern Cape	9	3	1	4	1	132.96
Western Province	9	4	3	2	0	124.22
North West	9	2	2	5	0	114.44
South Western Districts	10	1	6	3	0	87.80
Border	9	0	6	3	0	45.04

== Fixtures ==
=== October 2019 ===
3–5 October 2019
Scorecard

KwaZulu-Natal	v	South Western Districts
259 (85 overs); Michael Erlank 108 (192); Bradley de Villiers 3/28 (16 overs)		272 (71.5 overs); Tyrese Karelse 52 (98); Matthew Pollard 3/34 (18 overs)
179 (56 overs); Blayde Capell 30 (40); Tsepo Ndwandwa 3/24 (8 overs)		108 (46.2 overs); Heath Richards 18 (62); Matthew Pollard 3/13 (9 overs)

KwaZulu-Natal won by 58 runs
Kingsmead, Durban
Umpires: Siphelele Gasa and Jurie Sadler

- South Western Districts won the toss and elected to field.
- Matthew Pollard (KwaZulu-Natal), Heath Richards and Tyrese Karelse (South Western Districts) all made their first-class debuts.

3–5 October 2019
Scorecard

Gauteng	v	KwaZulu-Natal Inland
400/6d (97.5 overs); Joshua Richards 161 (228); Lwandiswa Zuma 2/74 (15 overs)		393 (121.2 overs); Mangaliso Mosehle 114 (200); Sean Jamison 4/86 (29 overs)
145 (55.2 overs); Joshua Richards 33 (47); Robbie Frylinck 3/35 (17 overs)		91/7 (24 overs); Mangaliso Mosehle 35* (56); Matt McGillivray 5/27 (6 overs)

Match drawn
City Oval, Pietermaritzburg
Umpires: Arno Jacobs and Philip Vosloo

- Gauteng won the toss and elected to bat.

3–5 October 2019
Scorecard

Eastern Province	v	Easterns
363/9d (88 overs); Kelly Smuts 120 (156); Matthew Arnold 3/61 (19 overs)		200 (59.4 overs); Wesley Marshall 69 (62); Basheeru-Deen Walters 5/48 (16.4 overs)
177/3d (39.4 overs); Mathew Christensen 67 (116); Jurie Snyman 1/26 (3.4 overs)		285/9 (91 overs); Wesley Marshall 71 (108); Basheeru-Deen Walters 3/71 (19 overs)

Match drawn
Willowmoore Park, Benoni
Umpires: Ryan Hendricks and Murray Brown

- Easterns won the toss and elected to field.

10–12 October 2019
Scorecard

Northern Cape	v	Eastern Province
163 (56.1 overs); Aubrey Swanepoel 58 (83); Basheeru-Deen Walters 4/38 (16 overs)		285 (87.5 overs); Nangomso Nqam 50* (129); Beyers Swanepoel 5/84 (23.5 overs)
178 (45.5 overs); Obus Pienaar 107* (111); Siviwe Gidana 6/30 (14.5 overs)		60/2 (17.3 overs); Mathew Christensen 37* (56); Kagiso Mohale 1/6 (4 overs)

Eastern Province won by 8 wickets
St George's Park, Port Elizabeth
Umpires: Arno Jacobs and Siphelele Gasa

- Northern Cape won the toss and elected to bat.

10–12 October 2019
Scorecard

South Western Districts	v	Free State
174 (71 overs); Brendon Louw 55* (104); Sean Whitehead 3/18 (17 overs)		138 (73 overs); Karabo Mogotsi 50 (211); Tsepo Ndwandwa 3/29 (26 overs)
265/6d (77.5 overs); Heath Richards 75 (79); Corné Dry 2/50 (16 overs)		302/4 (74.4 overs); Patrick Botha 106* (106); Tsepo Ndwandwa 2/97 (25 overs)

Free State won by 6 wickets
Recreation Ground, Oudtshoorn
Umpires: Philip Vosloo and Abdoellah Steenkamp

- South Western Districts won the toss and elected to bat.

17–19 October 2019
Scorecard

Border	v	North West
342 (98 overs); Jason Niemand 165 (256); Chad Classen 3/54 (21 overs)		431/9d (109.2 overs); Nicholas Smit 153 (239); Joshua Dodd 2/35 (13 overs)
231 (81.2 overs); Jason Niemand 88 (180); Johannes Diseko 5/86 (33 overs)		33/1 (4.4 overs); Yassar Cook 19* (17); Phaphama Fojela 1/18 (2.4 overs)

Match drawn
Senwes Park, Potchefstroom
Umpires: Abongile Sodumo and Abdoellah Steenkamp

- Border won the toss and elected to bat.
- Henro van Rensburg, Bradley Lynch, Nicholas Smit (North West) and Jacques Porter (Border) all made their first-class debuts.

17–19 October 2019
Scorecard

Northerns	v	Western Province
303 (89 overs); Ruan de Swardt 75 (131); Thando Ntini 3/49 (22 overs)		94 (43.1 overs); Andre Malan 22 (35); Ruben Trumpelmann 4/27 (11 overs)
		132 (52.4 overs) (f/o); Justin Dill 31* (98); Ruan de Swardt 2/14 (10 overs)

Northerns won by an innings and 77 runs
Newlands, Cape Town
Umpires: Thomas Mokorosi and Clifford Isaacs

- Western Province won the toss and elected to field.
- Ryan Klein (Western Province) and Evan Jones (Northerns) both made their first-class debuts.

17–19 October 2019
Scorecard

Gauteng	v	Boland
376 (93.4 overs); Joshua Richards 144 (151); Ziyaad Abrahams 4/72 (16.4 overs)		208 (50.3 overs); Fritz de Beer 52 (77); Sean Jamison 5/37 (12.3 overs)
109/1 (25.4 overs); Ryan Rickelton 57* (84); Ziyaad Abrahams 1/12 (8 overs)		276 (84 overs) (f/o); Isma-eel Gafieldien 102* (137); Codi Yusuf 5/76 (17 overs)

Gauteng won by 9 wickets
New Wanderers Stadium, Johannesburg
Umpires: Lauren Agenbag and Murray Brown

- Boland won the toss and elected to field.
- Codi Yusuf (Gauteng) made his first-class debut.

23–25 October 2019
Scorecard

Boland	v	Northerns
237 (92.2 overs); Cebo Tshiki 90 (236); Ruben Trumpelmann 3/42 (17 overs)		100/2 (28.3 overs); Gionne Koopman 46* (94); Ziyaad Abrahams 1/20 (6 overs)

Match drawn
Boland Park, Paarl
Umpires: Clifford Isaacs and Jurie Sadler

- Northerns won the toss and elected to field.

24–26 October 2019
Scorecard

Eastern Province	v	Border
365/9d (110 overs); Thomas Kaber 96 (160); Phaphama Fojela 4/49 (24 overs)		210 (56.2 overs); Ayabulela Gqamane 107 (42); Basheeru-Deen Walters 5/46 (15 overs)
189/3d (42.5 overs); Mathew Christensen 100* (134); Alindile Mhletywa 3/44 (10 overs)		159 (42.4 overs); Brandon Williams 64* (94); Basheeru-Deen Walters 5/61 (14.4 overs)

Eastern Province won by 185 runs
Buffalo Park, East London
Umpires: Jan Erasmus and Murray Brown

- Border won the toss and elected to field.
- Alindile Mhletywa (Border) made his first-class debut.

24–26 October 2019
Scorecard

Gauteng	v	Free State
423/8d (114.5 overs); Ryan Rickelton 202* (345); Nealan van Heerden 3/76 (24 overs)		253 (74.2 overs); Duan Jansen 59 (100); Aristides Karvelas 3/39 (16 overs)
		188/8 (72 overs) (f/o); Patrick Botha 83* (180); Ayavuya Myoli 4/46 (16 overs)

Match drawn
New Wanderers Stadium, Johannesburg
Umpires: Gawie Botha and Thomas Mokorosi

- Gauteng won the toss and elected to bat.

24–26 October 2019
Scorecard

Western Province	v	North West
170 (69.4 overs); Jack Newby 69 (141); Jon Hinrichsen 3/31 (11.4 overs)		286 (83.1 overs); Andrea Agathangelou 106 (130); Mpho Ndumo 4/42 (12 overs)
134 (50.3 overs); Mthiwekhaya Nabe 54 (83); Chad Classen 5/38 (12 overs)		72/0 (19.1 overs); Lesego Senokwane 33* (76)

North West won by 10 wickets
Senwes Park, Potchefstroom
Umpires: Mazizi Gampu and Abdoellah Steenkamp

- Western Province won the toss and elected to bat.
- Tayo Walbrugh and Sisonke Mazele (Western Province) both made their first-class debuts.

24–26 October 2019
Scorecard

KwaZulu-Natal Inland	v	Easterns
178 (47.4 overs); Tyron Koen 74* (82); Ryan Cartwright 4/38 (12.4 overs)		286 (83.1 overs); Andrea Agathangelou 106 (130); Mpho Ndumo 4/42 (12 overs)
273 (100 overs); Kurtlyn Mannikam 80 (169); Jurie Snyman 5/55 (27 overs)		162/7 (39 overs); Jurie Snyman 50 (52); Gareth Dukes 3/54 (14 overs)

Match drawn
Willowmoore Park, Benoni
Umpires: Dennis Smith and Ryan Hendricks

- Easterns won the toss and elected to field.
- Musawenkosi Twala (Easterns) and Caleb Pillay (KwaZulu-Natal Inland) both made their first-class debuts.

31 October – 2 November 2019
Scorecard

Western Province	v	Free State
185 (54 overs); David Bedingham 45 (65); Thandolwethu Mnyaka 3/33 (8 overs)		149 (60 overs); Patrick Botha 46 (73); Qaasim Adams 3/24 (8 overs)
341/9d (85.2 overs); Qaasim Adams 83 (102); Nealan van Heerden 2/33 (10 overs)		233 (69.2 overs); Patrick Botha 74 (112); Justin Dill 3/37 (17 overs)

Western Province won by 144 runs
University of Free State Ground, Bloemfontein
Umpires: Lauren Agenbag and Philip Vosloo

- Free State won the toss and elected to field.

31 October – 2 November 2019
Scorecard

KwaZulu-Natal	v	Northern Cape
182 (54.2 overs); Tyron Koen 53* (72); Luvuyo Adam 3/21 (8.2 overs)		462 (111.2 overs); Beyers Swanepoel 188* (169); Zakariya Paruk 4/64 (18 overs)
254 (60.2 overs); Jason Wagener 60 (54); Desmond de Koker 3/65 (19 overs)

Northern Cape won by an innings and 26 runs
Diamond Oval, Kimberley
Umpires: Lubabalo Gcuma and Marlon Jansen

- KwaZulu-Natal won the toss and elected to bat.
- Jason Wagener and Neill Jordaan (KwaZulu-Natal) both made their first-class debuts.

31 October – 2 November 2019
Scorecard

Easterns	v	North West
95 (39.5 overs); Sizwe Masondo 32 (82); Eldred Hawken 9/14 (15 overs)		310 (94.1 overs); Yassar Cook 90 (162); Clayton August 4/59 (25 overs)
249 (102 overs); Jurie Snyman 75 (121); Jon Hinrichsen 4/40 (18 overs)		31/2 (5.3 overs); Nicholas Smit 15* (14); Clayton August 2/9 (2.3 overs)

Match drawn
Senwes Park, Potchefstroom
Umpires: Abongile Sodumo and Murray Brown

- Easterns won the toss and elected to bat.

=== November 2019 ===
7–9 November 2019
Scorecard

South Western Districts	v	Gauteng
405 (115.1 overs); Brendon Louw 167 (239); Codi Yusuf 4/78 (24.1 overs)		183 (49.3 overs); Dominic Hendricks 63 (102); Renaldo Meyer 4/55 (16 overs)
184 (52 overs); Niel Hornbuckle 71* (99); Tumelo Tlhokwe 4/47 (16 overs)		185/2 (58 overs); Dominic Hendricks 79* (169); Ndumiso Mvelase 1/20 (10 overs)

Match drawn
Recreation Ground, Oudtshoorn
Umpires: Godwin Von Willingh and Stephen Rex

- South Western Districts won the toss and elected to bat.

7–9 November 2019
Scorecard

Free State	v	Boland
501/8d (101 overs); Patrick Botha 191 (196); Ziyaad Abrahams 4/78 (23 overs)		108 (47.1 overs); Kobus Scholtz 28 (68); Nealan van Heerden 3/12 (9.1 overs)
		112 (40 overs) (f/o); Kobus Scholtz 33 (63); Nealan van Heerden 4/19 (7 overs)

Free State won by an innings and 281 runs
Mangaung Oval, Bloemfontein
Umpires: Rudi Birkenstock and Gawie Botha

- Boland won the toss and elected to field.

7–9 November 2019
Scorecard

Northerns	v	Northern Cape
194 (55.5 overs); Rubin Hermann 45 (90); Beyers Swanepoel 5/40 (14 overs)		249 (64.4 overs); Grant Mokoena 74 (71); Gideon Peters 4/62 (15 overs)
393 (106.3 overs); Ruan de Swardt 102 (152); Luvuyo Adam 4/55 (20.3 overs)		182/2 (70 overs); Patrick Kruger 40* (112); Gideon Peters 4/44 (18 overs)

Match drawn
Diamond Oval, Kimberley
Umpires: Ryan Hendricks and Marlon Jansen

- Northern Cape won the toss and elected to field.
- Modiri Litheko (Northerns) made his first-class debut.

14–16 November 2019
Scorecard

Border	v	Western Province
127/3 (28 overs); Gihahn Cloete 51 (61); Jason Smith 2/29 (8 overs)

Match drawn
Buffalo Park, East London
Umpires: Sinethemba Mjekula and Jurie Sadler

- Western Province won the toss and elected to field.
- Only 28 overs were bowled on day 1, and no play was possible on days 2 and 3 due to rain.
- Diego du Plessis (Western Province) made his first-class debut.

14–16 November 2019
Scorecard

North West	v	Northern Cape
119 (42.3 overs); Kagiso Rapulana 60 (115); Desmond de Koker 5/45 (13.3 overs)		409/5d (117.5 overs); Ernest Kemm 150* (362); Jon Hinrichsen 4/67 (22 overs)
191 (58 overs); Kagiso Rapulana 47 (79); Beyers Swanepoel 7/50 (15 overs)

Northern Cape won by an innings and 99 runs
Senwes Park, Potchefstroom
Umpires: Kevin Lawrence and Ryan Hendricks

- Northern Cape won the toss and elected to field.

14–16 November 2019
Scorecard

South Western Districts	v	Northerns
98 (34.5 overs); Niel Hornbuckle 33 (47); Gionne Koopman 3/2 (0.5 overs)		444/4d (120 overs); Diego Rosier 164* (227); Bailey Aarons 2/61 (19 overs)
164 (70.5 overs); Brendon Louw 66 (145); Gionne Koopman 5/15 (7.5 overs)

Northerns won by an innings and 182 runs
Tshwane University of Technology Oval, Pretoria
Umpires: Jan Erasmus and Mazizi Gampu

- South Western Districts won the toss and elected to bat.

14–16 November 2019
Scorecard

KwaZulu-Natal	v	Easterns
263 (85 overs); Keith Dudgeon 88 (111); Clayton August 3/31 (18 overs)		387 (123.1 overs); Yaseen Valli 82 (254); Okuhle Cele 4/115 (30 overs)
129 (43.5 overs); Keith Dudgeon 55 (86); Clayton August 4/35 (11 overs)		6/0 (1.3 overs); Yaseen Valli 4* (5)

Easterns won by 10 wickets
Willowmoore Park, Benoni
Umpires: Bongani Ntshebe and Marlon Jansen

- Easterns won the toss and elected to field.
- Aron Visser (Easterns) made his first-class debut.

14–16 November 2019
Scorecard

Boland	v	Eastern Province
205 (64.2 overs); Sinalo Gobeni 67 (105); Glenton Stuurman 4/58 (16 overs)		119 (41 overs); Edward Moore 25 (22); Craig Alexander 5/49 (15 overs)
144 (65 overs); Daniel Sincuba 40* (53); Jade de Klerk 7/46 (22 overs)		232/4 (68.4 overs); Edward Moore 129 (190); Ziyaad Abrahams 3/35 (17 overs)

Eastern Province won by 6 wickets
St George's Park, Port Elizabeth
Umpires: Abongile Sodumo and Dawood Arkeldien

- Boland won the toss and elected to bat.

21–23 November 2019
Scorecard

KwaZulu-Natal Inland	v	Free State
286 (84.3 overs); Gareth Dukes 77 (130); Corné Dry 3/50 (13.3 overs)		529/6d (119 overs); Andries Gous 256* (333); Lwandiswa Zuma 2/116 (30 overs)
246/5 (64.4 overs); Luke Schlemmer 82 (95); Romano Terblanche 1/15 (8 overs)

Match drawn
Mangaung Oval, Bloemfontein
Umpires: Thomas Mokorosi and Marlon Jansen

- Free State won the toss and elected to field.

21–23 November 2019
Scorecard

Border	v	Northern Cape
145 (53.5 overs); Clayton Bosch 30 (52); Patrick Kruger 3/29 (11 overs)		383/5d (113.2 overs); Ernest Kemm 161* (334); Phaphama Fojela 3/50 (20 overs)
80 (31.1 overs); Bradley Williams 28 (65); Beyers Swanepoel 4/13 (8 overs)

Northern Cape won by an innings and 158 runs
Diamond Oval, Kimberley
Umpires: Rudi Birkenstock and Lauren Agenbag

- Northern Cape won the toss and elected to field.
- Jerome Bossr (Border) made his first-class debut.

21–23 November 2019
Scorecard

KwaZulu-Natal	v	North West
93 (43.2 overs); Calvin Savage 33 (85); Eldred Hawken 4/23 (16 overs)		109 (39.1 overs); Nicholas Smit 29 (35); Senuran Muthusamy 4/17 (13.1 overs)
248 (93.1 overs); Keith Dudgeon 65 (101); Chad Classen 3/37 (15 overs)		181 (61.4 overs); Katleho Leokaoke 37 (101); Calvin Savage 4/46 (11 overs)

KwaZulu-Natal won by 51 runs
Kingsmead, Durban
Umpires: Gladman Gaseba and Mazizi Gampu

- North West won the toss and elected to field.
- Eben Botha (North West) made his first-class debut.

28–30 November 2019
Scorecard

Western Province	v	Northern Cape
457/6d (110 overs); Zubayr Hamza 183 (233); Mbulelo Budaza 2/61 (14 overs)		324 (120.1 overs); Keegan Petersen 155 (286); Junaid Dawood 4/114 (39 overs)
51/2d (26 overs); Matthew Kleinveldt 22 (41); Mbulelo Budaza 1/9 (4 overs)

Match drawn
Diamond Oval, Kimberley
Umpires: Gawie Botha and Ryan Hendricks

- Northern Cape won the toss and elected to field.
- Blake Schraader (Northern Cape) made his first-class debut.

=== December 2019 ===
12–14 December 2019
Scorecard

KwaZulu-Natal	v	Free State

Match abandoned
Kingsmead, Durban
Umpires: Sinethemba Mjekula and Abdoellah Steenkamp

- No toss.
- No play was possible due to rain.

12–14 December 2019
Scorecard

KwaZulu-Natal Inland	v	Northern Cape

Match abandoned
City Oval, Pietermaritzburg
Umpires: Kevin Lawrence and Dawood Arkeldien

- No toss.
- No play was possible due to rain.

12–14 December 2019
Scorecard

Gauteng	v	Northerns
377/5d (101 overs); Dominic Hendricks 187 (312); Dayyaan Galiem 2/52 (18 overs)		413/9 (109.4 overs); Jonathan Vandiar 84 (133); Tumelo Tlhokwe 3/74 (14 overs)

Match drawn
New Wanderers Stadium, Johannesburg
Umpires: Jan Erasmus and Mazizi Gampu

- Northerns won the toss and elected to field.

19–21 December 2019
Scorecard

Eastern Province	v	Free State
283 (68.1 overs); Lesiba Ngoepe 135 (175); Duan Jansen 3/38 (14.1 overs)		435/9d (115.4 overs); Sean Whitehead 103* (142); Lizo Makhosi 3/112 (24 overs)
339/5 (85 overs); Marco Marais 111 (140); Duan Jansen 2/49 (12 overs)

Match drawn
St George's Park, Port Elizabeth
Umpires: Abongile Sodumo and Philip Vosloo

- Eastern Province won the toss and elected to bat.
- Lyle Petersen (Eastern Province) made his first-class debut.

19–21 December 2019
Scorecard

KwaZulu-Natal	v	Western Province
193 (70.4 overs); Mishkal Ramsaroop 73 (148); Ryan Klein 4/34 (19.4 overs)		139 (57.1 overs); Tayo Walbrugh 38 (74); Zakhele Qwabe 4/25 (16 overs)
166 (54.3 overs); Vaughn van Jaarsveld 82 (105); Justin Dill 6/39 (15.3 overs)		96 (39 overs); Carlos Koyana 33 (50); Zakariya Paruk 5/31 (11 overs)

KwaZulu-Natal won by 124 runs
Ed Fivaz Oval, Durbanville
Umpires: Thomas Mokorosi and Ryan Hendricks

- Western Province won the toss and elected to field.
- David Schierhout (Western Province) made his first-class debut.

=== January 2020 ===
9–11 January 2020
Scorecard

Boland	v	Easterns
410/9d (123.5 overs); Ruan Terblanche 105 (231); Ryan Cartwright 3/72 (25 overs)		642/4d (156.5 overs); Andrea Agathangelou 313 (459); Isma-eel Gafieldien 3/70 (13.5 overs)

Match drawn
Boland Park, Paarl
Umpires: Rudi Birkenstock and Ryan Hendricks

- Boland won the toss and elected to bat.
- Andrea Agathangelou and Yaseen Valli (Easterns) set a new record in first-class cricket in South Africa for the highest opening partnership (485 runs).
- Andrea Agathangelou also scored his first triple century in first-class cricket.

16–18 January 2020
Scorecard

Boland	v	KwaZulu-Natal Inland
417/7d (121.2 overs); Ruan Terblanche 142 (300); Gareth Dukes 3/49 (17 overs)		165 (57 overs); Cameron Shekleton 64 (127); Nkululeko Serame 5/68 (20 overs)
		328/8 (123.1 overs) (f/o); Kushen Kishun 85 (245); Craig Alexander 5/58 (23 overs)

Match drawn
Boland Park, Paarl
Umpires: Thomas Mokorosi and Clifford Isaacs

- Boland won the toss and elected to bat.

16–18 January 2020
Scorecard

South Western Districts	v	Eastern Province
238 (68.4 overs); Richardt Frenz 51 (81); Thomas Kaber 5/61 (14.4 overs)		261 (104.4 overs); Marco Marais 55 (84); Stefan Tait 4/40 (15.4 overs)
197/3d (58 overs); Jean du Plessis 64 (91); Akhona Kula 2/37 (9 overs)

Match drawn
Recreation Ground, Oudtshoorn
Umpires: Abongile Sodumo and Stephen Rex

- South Western Districts won the toss and elected to bat.
- Jhedli van Briesies (South Western Districts) and Tristan Stubbs (Eastern Province) both made their first-class debuts.

16–18 January 2020
Scorecard

Gauteng	v	Easterns
242 (81.2 overs); Mitchell Van Buuren 88 (145); Sinenhlanhla Zwane 3/51 (16 overs)		387/9d (105.4 overs); Andrea Agathangelou 93 (171); Sean Jamison 3/78 (21 overs)
176/7 (67 overs); Shaylen Pillay 59 (131); Kofi Apea-Adu 2/23 (10 overs)

Match drawn
New Wanderers Stadium, Johannesburg
Umpires: Jan Erasmus and Jurie Sadler

- Gauteng won the toss and elected to bat.
- Jacob Miltz (Gauteng) made his first-class debut.

16–18 January 2020
Scorecard

Northerns	v	Border
416 (103.1 overs); Evan Jones 112 (89); Phaphama Fojela 3/42 (22 overs)		209 (59.3 overs); Phaphama Fojela 56* (25); Kyle Simmonds 4/59 (20 overs)
		206/7 (70.3 overs) (f/o); Nonelela Yikha 66* (137); Kyle Simmonds 3/77 (27 overs)

Match drawn
Tshwane University of Technology Oval, Pretoria
Umpires: Lauren Agenbag and Murray Brown

- Northerns won the toss and elected to bat.
- Nonelela Yikha (Border) made his first-class debut.

23–25 January 2020
Scorecard

Western Province	v	South Western Districts
314/8d (93.5 overs); Zac Elkin 162 (256); Renaldo Meyer 4/61 (21.5 overs)		110 (51.3 overs); Renaldo Meyer 32 (46); Justin Dill 6/25 (15 overs)
		173 (67.1 overs) (f/o); Richardt Frenz 66 (162); Ryan Klein 4/42 (18 overs)

Western Province won by an innings and 31 runs
Newlands, Cape Town
Umpires: Siphelele Gasa and Dennis Smith

- South Western Districts won the toss and elected to field.

23–25 January 2020
Scorecard

North West	v	KwaZulu-Natal Inland
263/7d (79 overs); Eben Botha 102 (133); Mpho Ndumo 4/37 (14 overs)		58/2 (21 overs); Luke Schlemmer 35* (50); Chad Classen 1/15 (6 overs)

Match drawn
City Oval, Pietermaritzburg
Umpires: Rudi Birkenstock and Murray Brown

- North West won the toss and elected to bat.
- No play was possible on day 1.
- Jordan Morris (North West) made his first-class debut.

30 January–1 February 2020
Scorecard

Gauteng	v	Eastern Province
239 (68.3 overs); Delano Potgieter 122* (176); Basheeru-Deen Walters 6/60 (19 overs)		210 (66.3 overs); Kelly Smuts 109 (144); Shaylen Pillay 4/29 (9.3 overs)
239 (74.3 overs); Dominic Hendricks 93 (148); Kelly Smuts 5/50 (21 overs)		197/9 (71.2 overs); Kelly Smuts 56 (88); Delano Potgieter 6/33 (18 overs)

Match drawn
St George's Park, Port Elizabeth
Umpires: Thomas Mokorosi and Gladman Gaseba

- Eastern Province won the toss and elected to field.

30 January–1 February 2020
Scorecard

Boland	v	Border
374/9d (111.5 overs); Ferisco Adams 101 (91); Phaphama Fojela 2/62 (19 overs)		173 (44.1 overs); Mncedisi Malika 55 (62); Charl Cyster 4/42 (12 overs)
68/4d (11.4 overs); Ferisco Adams 23 (21); Phaphama Fojela 2/29 (6 overs)		134 (28.3 overs); Clayton Bosch 30 (33); Sinalo Gobeni 5/48 (7.3 overs)

Boland won by 135 runs
Buffalo Park, East London
Umpires: Stephen Rex and Jurie Sadler

- Border won the toss and elected to field.
- No play was possible on day 1 due to rain.
- Stuart Els and Mathew Fourie (Border) both made their first-class debuts.

30 January–1 February 2020
Scorecard

Northerns	v	KwaZulu-Natal Inland
322 (68.1 overs); Evan Jones 74 (55); Kurtlyn Mannikam 4/125 (18 overs)		407 (123.4 overs); Cameron Shekleton 93 (204); Alfred Mothoa 2/26 (17 overs)
192 (62 overs); Evan Jones 56 (145); Lwandiswa Zuma 4/46 (16 overs)		37/1 (8 overs); Luke Schlemmer 20* (24); Alfred Mothoa 1/23 (4 overs)

Match drawn
Tshwane University of Technology Oval, Pretoria
Umpires: Ryan Hendricks and Marlon Jansen

- Northerns won the toss and elected to bat.

=== February 2020 ===
6–8 February 2020
Scorecard

North West	v	South Western Districts
196 (69 overs); Eben Botha 82 (102); Tsepo Ndwandwa 4/51 (22 overs)		91 (38.4 overs); Jean du Plessis 41 (86); Henro van Rensburg 4/21 (8 overs)
146/9d (53.2 overs); Katleho Leokaoke 33 (67); Tsepo Ndwandwa 5/50 (24.2 overs)		170 (61.3 overs); Niel Hornbuckle 50 (108); Henro van Rensburg 3/40 (15 overs)

North West won by 81 runs
Recreation Ground, Oudtshoorn
Umpires: Siphelele Gasa and Abongile Sodumo

- South Western Districts won the toss and elected to field.
- Rayyaan Rhode (North West) made his first-class debut.

13–15 February 2020
Scorecard

Boland	v	KwaZulu-Natal
155 (60.3 overs); Cebo Tshiki 47 (108); Calvin Savage 5/38 (15 overs)		274 (83.4 overs); Calvin Savage 104* (134); Nkululeko Serame 5/77 (28 overs)
313/9 (133 overs); Fritz de Beer 72 (107); Michael Erlank 2/9 (14 overs)

Match drawn
Boland Park, Paarl
Umpires: Ryan Hendricks and Sinethemba Mjekula

- KwaZulu-Natal won the toss and elected to field.
- Timothy Whitehead (Boland) and Ruan Cronje (KwaZulu-Natal) both made their first-class debuts.

13–15 February 2020
Scorecard

Border	v	South Western Districts
168 (84 overs); Jason Niemand 51 (172); Tsepo Ndwandwa 4/62 (28 overs)		320/3d (122 overs); Jean du Plessis 162* (356); Mathew Fourie 2/49 (14 overs)
189 (65.1 overs); Mncedisi Malika 37 (59); Tsepo Ndwandwa 5/39 (25.1 overs)		38/0 (9 overs); Kirwin Christoffels 24* (31)

South Western Districts won by 10 runs
Recreation Ground, Oudtshoorn
Umpires: Stephen Rex and Jurie Sadler

- Border won the toss and elected to bat.
- Jonathan Craniey and Jason Raubenheimer (Border) both made their first-class debuts.

13–15 February 2020
Scorecard

KwaZulu-Natal Inland	v	Eastern Province
236 (75.5 overs); Luke Schlemmer 68 (149); Thomas Kaber 4/57 (13.5 overs)		350 (112.3 overs); Tristan Stubbs 105 (135); Tyron Koen 4/50 (26 overs)
262/5 (81 overs); Cody Chetty 119* (159); Siviwe Gidana 1/14 (7 overs)

Match drawn
City Oval, Pietermaritzburg
Umpires: Mazizi Gampu and Kevin Lawrence

- KwaZulu-Natal Inland won the toss and elected to bat.
- Slade van Staden (KwaZulu-Natal Inland) made his first-class debut.

13–15 February 2020
Scorecard

Western Province	v	Gauteng
194 (68.2 overs); Andre Malan 57 (111); Bryce Parsons 3/9 (6 overs)		186 (74.1 overs); Tshepang Dithole 63 (188); Ryan Klein 3/31 (16 overs)
253/5d (73 overs); Matthew Kleinveldt 144* (214); Sean Jamison 2/46 (19 overs)		201 (61.1 overs); Bryce Parsons 52 (101); Andre Malan 2/29 (13 overs)

Western Province won by 60 runs
Newlands, Cape Town
Umpires: Gawie Botha and Abdoellah Steenkamp

- Gauteng won the toss and elected to field.
- Levert Manje and Bryce Parsons (Gauteng) both made their first-class debuts.

20–22 February 2020
Scorecard

Easterns	v	Free State
188 (54.3 overs); Wesley Marshall 73 (124); Sean Whitehead 6/27 (12.3 overs)		259 (80.5 overs); Sean Whitehead 80 (165); Matthew Arnold 3/57 (17 overs)
121/7 (47 overs); Wesley Marshall 38 (32); Thandolwethu Mnyaka 2/19 (7 overs)

Match drawn
University of Free State Ground, Bloemfontein
Umpires: Jan Erasmus and Mazizi Gampu

- Free State won the toss and elected to field.
- No play was possible on day 1 due to rain.
- Philip Visser (Free State) made his first-class debut.

20–22 February 2020
Scorecard

North West	v	Northerns
311 (109.5 overs); Lesego Senokwane 143 (324); Kyle Simmonds 7/65 (30 overs)		284/9d (71.4 overs); Jonathan Vandiar 104 (148); Migael Pretorius 4/67 (20 overs)
145/3 (33 overs); Yassar Cook 76 (82); Gionne Koopman 1/9 (3 overs)

Match drawn
Tshwane University of Technology Oval, Pretoria
Umpires: Gawie Botha and Abongile Sodumo

- North West won the toss and elected to bat.

27–29 February 2020
Scorecard

Border	v	KwaZulu-Natal
124 (27.4 overs); Bamanye Xenxe 28 (26); Zakhele Qwabe 4/37 (9 overs)		315/7d (88.5 overs); Bradley Porteous 171 (273); Phaphama Fojela 3/43 (17.5 overs)
211 (49.2 overs); Phaphama Fojela 56 (22); Zakariya Paruk 4/37 (9.2 overs)		24/0 (4 overs); Michael Erlank 13* (14)

KwaZulu-Natal won by 10 wickets
Buffalo Park, East London
Umpires: Rudi Birkenstock and Bongani Ntshebe

- KwaZulu-Natal won the toss and elected to field.

=== March 2020 ===
5–7 March 2020
Scorecard

Eastern Province	v	Boland
401/8d (124 overs); Mathew Christensen 177 (349); Charl Cyster 3/94 (24 overs)		214 (77.2 overs); Fritz de Beer 55* (113); Tian Koekemoer 3/23 (11 overs)
		186/2 (76.5 overs) (f/o); Isma-eel Gafieldien 65* (136); Thomas Kaber 2/66 (26.5 overs)

Match drawn
Boland Park, Paarl
Umpires: Stephen Rex and Marlon Jansen

- Boland won the toss and elected to field.

5–7 March 2020
Scorecard

Border	v	KwaZulu-Natal Inland
92 (50.3 overs); Nonelela Yikha 39 (83); Kurtlyn Mannikam 5/21 (17.3 overs)		277 (86.5 overs); Gareth Dukes 81* (103); Clayton Bosch 3/35 (17 overs)
160 (71.2 overs); Jerome Bossr 50 (135); Kurtlyn Mannikam 4/52 (29 overs)

KwaZulu-Natal Inland won by an innings and 25 runs
City Oval, Pietermaritzburg
Umpires: Mazizi Gampu and Gladman Gaseba

- Border won the toss and elected to bat.

5–7 March 2020
Scorecard

Northern Cape	v	South Western Districts
298 (102.2 overs); Obus Pienaar 102 (148); Francois Harley 3/69 (19.2 overs)		336 (94.3 overs); Jean du Plessis 88 (192); Ernest Kemm 3/46 (19.3 overs)
240/8d (69.4 overs); Clyde Fortuin 82 (178); Tyrese Karelse 2/4 (2 overs)		84/2 (30 overs); Jean du Plessis 41* (86); Ernest Kemm 1/14 (6 overs)

Match drawn
Diamond Oval, Kimberley
Umpires: Jan Erasmus and Jurie Sadler

- South Western Districts won the toss and elected to field.
- Francois Harley (South Western Districts) made his first-class debut.

5–7 March 2020
Scorecard

Northerns	v	Easterns
373 (71.1 overs); Kyle Simmonds 113 (97); Matthew Arnold 5/93 (21 overs)		244 (69.5 overs); Wesley Marshall 70 (138); Kyle Simmonds 4/88 (28 overs)
270/4d (49.1 overs); Victor Mahlangu 114* (154); Wesley Marshall 1/19 (2.1 overs)		370/8 (107 overs); Sizwe Masondo 72 (48); Kyle Simmonds 3/100 (41 overs)

Match drawn
Tshwane University of Technology Oval, Pretoria
Umpires: Abongile Sodumo and Godwin Von Willingh

- Northerns won the toss and elected to bat.

12–14 March 2020
Scorecard

Northern Cape	v	Free State
137 (40.3 overs); Garnett Tarr 37 (84); Johan van Dyk 7/26 (12.3 overs)		192 (70 overs); Johan van Dyk 58 (141); Gert Cloete 6/41 (20 overs)
65/1 (20.2 overs); Obus Pienaar 45* (58); Corné Dry 1/9 (4 overs)

Match drawn
University of Free State Ground, Bloemfontein
Umpires: Jurie Sadler and Abdoellah Steenkamp

- Free State won the toss and elected to field.

12–14 March 2020
Scorecard

North West	v	Gauteng
261 (82 overs); Nicholas Smit 84 (174); Thamsanqa Rapelego 3/55 (13 overs)		112/5d (30 overs); Joshua Richards 42 (93); Jon Hinrichsen 4/45 (8 overs)
112/6d (30.4 overs); Eben Botha 53 (58); Codi Yusuf 4/7 (6.4 overs)		218/8 (36 overs); Joshua Richards 59 (34); Jon Hinrichsen 4/55 (12 overs)

Match drawn
New Wanderers Stadium, Johannesburg
Umpires: Arno Jacobs and Ryan Hendricks

- Gauteng won the toss and elected to field.

12–14 March 2020
Scorecard

South Western Districts	v	Easterns
161 (50.4 overs); Richardt Frenz 49 (89); Clayton August 5/46 (19 overs)		444/9d (108 overs); Kabelo Sekhukhune 140 (230); Tyrese Karelse 2/27 (10 overs)
135 (43.4 overs); Niel Hornbuckle 45 (58); Clayton August 7/40 (14.4 overs)

Easterns won by an innings and 148 runs
Willowmoore Park, Benoni
Umpires: Mazizi Gampu and Murray Brown

- Easterns won the toss and elected to field.

12–14 March 2020
Scorecard

Eastern Province	v	Western Province
136 (60.5 overs); Mtabozuko Nqam 45 (67); Ryan Klein 4/46 (18 overs)		203 (69.1 overs); Matthew Kleinveldt 64 (98); Sithembile Langa 4/35 (14.1 overs)
44 (28.5 overs); Mathew Christensen 14 (73); Tladi Bokako 6/12 (9.5 overs)

Western Province won by an innings and 23 runs
St George's Park, Port Elizabeth
Umpires: Thomas Mokorosi and Clifford Isaacs

- Western Province won the toss and elected to field.

12–14 March 2020
Scorecard

KwaZulu-Natal Inland	v	KwaZulu-Natal
99 (36.4 overs); Luke Schlemmer 53 (96); Zakhele Qwabe 7/26 (12.4 overs)		406/4d (104 overs); Jason Oakes 100* (132); Lwandiswa Zuma 2/122 (27 overs)
365 (147.3 overs); Cameron Shekleton 149 (303); Michael Erlank 5/66 (37.3 overs)		59/0 (5.5 overs); Bradley Porteous 30* (22)

KwaZulu-Natal won by 10 wickets
Kingsmead, Durban
Umpires: Dennis Smith and Abongile Sodumo

- KwaZulu-Natal won the toss and elected to field.

19–21 March 2020
Scorecard

North West	v	Free State

Match cancelled
Senwes Park, Potchefstroom

19–21 March 2020
Scorecard

Easterns	v	Northern Cape

Match cancelled
Willowmoore Park, Benoni

19–21 March 2020
Scorecard

Western Province	v	Boland

Match cancelled
Newlands, Cape Town

19–21 March 2020
Scorecard

Border	v	Gauteng

Match cancelled
Buffalo Park, East London

19–21 March 2020
Scorecard

KwaZulu-Natal	v	Northerns

Match cancelled
Kingsmead, Durban

== Final ==
2–5 April 2020
Scorecard

TBD	v	TBD

Match cancelled
