= List of South Western Districts representative cricketers =

This is a list of cricketers who have played first-class, List A or Twenty20 cricket matches for the South Western Districts cricket team in domestic South African men's cricket competitions.

South Western Districts have competed in top-level South African domestic first-class and List A cricket competitions since the 2006–07 season, and in Twenty20 competitions since 2011–12, although a team called South-West Districts played a single first-class match during the 1904–05 Currie Cup competition. (Note: Of the men who played in the 1904 match, only two played any other first-class matches. Cecil Pfaff played one other match for Rhodesia in 1910 against a touring team from England led by HDG Leveson-Gower, and Charles Vintcent played a total of six first-class matches, including three Test matches for South Africa in the 19th century.) The modern team is based at Oudtshoorn in the Western Cape region of South Africa and uses Recreation Ground, Oudtshoorn as its home ground.

Teams with the names South-West Districts and South Western Districts played occasional matches at levels below the top-level of domestic competition from the 1888–89 season. Players who appeared only for those teams are not included in the list. Many players on this list will have appeared for other teams, but only those who played for South Western Districts teams or the South-West Districts team in top-level competitions have been included here.

As of 1 July 2025

== A ==
- Bailey Aarons
- Travis Ackerman
- Glen Addicott
- Mark Adrianatos
- Andrea Agathangelou
- Hershell America
- William Archibald (Note: Played in the 1904 Currie Cup match.)
- Sammy-Joe Avontuur

== B ==
- Douglas Baartman
- Ottniel Baartman
- Mthobeli Bangindawo
- Gideon Barnard (Note: Barnard, who was born at Port Elizabeth in 1980, played one first-class match for the team, opening the batting in the final match of the 2006–07 season, their first at top-level. He scored 29 runs in an opening partnership of 149 with Sammy-Joe Avontuur against Kei, a team which only competed at the top-level of South African domestic cricket for one season.)
- Luke Beaufort
- Warren Bell
- Jonathan Beukes
- Mervyn Bock
- Tladi Bokako
- Francois Bonthuys
- Siyabonga Booi
- Eldridge Booysen
- Riaan Botha
- Leroi Bredenkamp
- Niel Bredenkamp
- Nigel Brouwers
- Nandre Burger

== C ==
- Blayde Capell
- Matthew Christensen
- Kirwin Christoffels
- Martin Coetzee
- Murray Commins

== D ==
- Terence Davis-Taylor
- Wilfred de Jager
- Marco de Kock
- Ruall de Reuck
- Conrad de Swardt
- Bradley de Villiers
- Burton de Wett
- Gareth Dukes
- Jean du Plessis
- Leus du Plooy

== E ==
- Denovan Ekstraal
- Sybrand Engelbrecht
- Grant Esau
- Errin Ewerts

== F ==
- Phaphama Fojela
- Bardo Fransman
- Richardt Frenz

== G ==
- Siviwe Gidana
- Bronwell Goeda
- Jarred Goncalves-Jardine
- Stephanus Grobler
- Khwezi Gumede

== H ==
- Garry Hampson
- Zubayr Hamza
- William Hantam
- Francois Harley
- Wessel Hartslief
- Jean Heunis
- D Hill
- Rudy Hillermann
- Rory Hopper
- Niel Hornbuckle
- Roelof Hugo

== J ==
- Kyle Jacobs
- Christiaan Jonker
- Justin Jordaan

== K ==
- Thomas Kaber
- Tyrese Karelse
- Simon Khomari
- Jongile Kilani
- Enathi Kitshini
- Hanno Kotze

== L ==
- Waldo Lategan
- George Linde
- Brendon Louw

== M ==
- Sintu Majeza
- Andre Malan
- Liabona Malife
- Richard Maree
- Christopher Marrow
- Merlin Masimela
- R Matfield
- Heinrich Matthee
- Adrian McLaren
- Ross McMillan
- Renaldo Meyer
- Aviwe Mgijima
- RG Mitchell
- Akhona Mnyaka
- Luthando Mnyanda
- Hlompho Modimokoane
- Sammy Mofokeng
- Pheko Moletsane
- Gary Moos
- Adriaan Morkel
- Levin Muller
- Nathan Murray
- Ndumiso Mvelase

== N ==
- Sithembiso Ndwandwa
- Tshepiso Ndwandwa
- Ntabyozuke Nobebe
- Onke Nyaku

== O ==
- Jonathan October
- Yamkela Oliphant
- Andre Olivier

== P ==
- Dane Paterson
- Arnold Peiser
- Cecil Pfaff
- Vernon Philander
- Dane Piedt
- Marcello Piedt
- Obus Pienaar
- Brayton Plaatjies
- Rhupino Plaatjies
- David Pryke
- Andrew Puttick

== R ==
- Gurshwin Rabie
- Jaco van Rensburg
- Réagon Rhode
- Heath Richards
- Lonwabo Rodolo
- Lance Roelfse
- George Rogers

== S ==
- Gilroy Saaiman
- Kobus Scholtz
- Alan Searle
- Phillimon Selowa
- Nkululeko Serame
- Letlotlo Sesele
- Nelson Setimani
- Mthokozisi Shezi
- Siya Simetu
- Daniel Sincuba
- Nkosinathi Siyoli
- Johan Smal
- Jason Smith
- Kelly Smuts
- Ruan Stander
- Gerhard Strydom
- Glenton Stuurman
- Pieter Stuurman

== T ==
- Stefan Tait
- Ruan Terblanche

== V ==
- Yaseen Valli
- Henry van Buddenbrock
- Jhedli van Briesies
- George van Heerden
- Christo van Schalkwyk
- Keenan Vieira
- Dane Vilas
- Charles Vintcent
- Lyndon Volkwyn
- Mesuli Vuba

== W ==
- Todd Walker
- Basheeru-Deen Walters
- Sean Whitehead
- Reece Williams
- Sydwill Williams
