= 2025–26 CSA 4-Day Series =

Cricket tournament

- Dates: 25 September 2025 – 22 February 2026
- Administrator: Cricket South Africa
- Cricket format: First-class
- Tournament format: Single round-robin
- Champions: Div 1: Lions (5th title); Div 2: Knights (4th title)
- Participants: 15
- Matches: 51
- Most runs: Div 1: Gavin Kaplan (903); Div 2: Gihahn Cloete (743)
- Most wickets: Div 1: Matthew Boast (43); Div 2: Ernest Kemm (40)

The 2025–26 CSA 4-Day Franchise Series was the 119th CSA 4-Day Domestic Series cricket season in South Africa. It was the fifth edition of the post-franchise era and retained the two-division league format introduced the previous year. As in 2024, Division One had eight teams and Division Two had seven teams. The competition took place in South Africa from 25 September 2025 to 22 February 2026.

== Points Table ==
=== Division 1 Standings ===
Pos	Team	Pld	W	L	D	Pts	Qualification
1	Lions	7	3	1	3	124.36	Advance to the Final
2	Warriors	7	3	1	3	113.46	Advance to the Final
3	Dolphins	7	3	1	3	113.1	
4	Boland	7	3	2	2	107.8	
5	North West	7	3	3	1	105.26	
6	Western Province	7	3	4	0	100.12	
7	Titans	7	3	4	0	99.34	
8	KwaZulu-Natal Inland	7	0	5	2	51.1	

Source: ESPNcricinfo, SuperSport

=== Division 2 Standings ===
Pos	Team	Pld	W	L	D	Pts	Qualification
1	Knights	6	5	0	1	127.38	Advanced to the Final
2	Easterns	6	4	1	1	113.44	Advanced to the Final
3	South Western Districts	6	3	3	0	90.38	
4	Northern Cape	6	2	3	1	70.04	
5	Mpumalanga	6	1	2	3	63.98	
6	Border	6	1	3	2	61.34	
7	Limpopo	6	0	4	2	29.52	

Source: ESPNcricinfo, SuperSport
Rules for classification: Points system: 16 for a win, 8 for a tie, 6 for a draw.
- Batting bonus points: in the first innings only, 1 point for reaching 150 runs, then 0.02 points for each run thereafter.
- Bowling bonus points: in the first innings only, 1 point for taking three wickets, then 1 point for each two wickets thereafter.

== Division 1 Fixtures ==
=== September ===
25–28 September 2025
Scorecard

Boland	v	Titans
616/9d (163.2 overs); Gavin Kaplan 238 (396); Tsepo Ndwandwa 6/178 (43.2 overs)		366 (101.3 overs); Donovan Ferreira 123 (140); Glenton Stuurman 6/61 (22 overs)
52/1 (5 overs); Grant Roelofsen 26 (12); Janco Smit 1/23 (2 overs)		301 (85.5 overs) (f/o); Lhuan-dre Pretorius 75 (135); Akhona Mnyaka 4/62 (14 overs)

Boland won by 9 wickets
Boland Park, Paarl
Umpires: Thomas Mokorosi and Warren Wyngaard
Player of the match: Gavin Kaplan (Boland)

- Boland won the toss and elected to bat.
- Nathan Jacobs (Boland) made his first-class debut.
- Gavin Kaplan (Boland) scored his maiden double century in first-class cricket.
- Points: Boland 25.38, Titans 5.08

25–28 September 2025
Scorecard

Warriors	v	Western Province
281 (87 overs); Sinethemba Qeshile 129 (211); Dane Paterson 3/42 (16 overs); Beuran Hendricks 3/42 (16 overs)		182 (56.2 overs); Valentine Kitime 54 (117); Ntando Soni 3/18 (8 overs)
253/8d (64.1 overs); Matthew Breetzke 66 (79); Tshepo Moreki 5/62 (17.1 overs)		304 (83.4 overs); Daniel Smith 63 (101); Duanne Olivier 3/64 (16 overs)

Warriors won by 48 runs
St George's Park, Gqeberha
Umpires: Abongile Sodumo and Abdoellah Steenkamp
Player of the match: Sinethemba Qeshile (Warriors)

- Warriors won the toss and elected to bat.
- Ntando Soni (Warriors) made his first-class debut.
- Points: Warriors 23.62, Western Province 5.64

25–28 September 2025
Scorecard

KwaZulu-Natal Inland	v	North West
399 (104.5 overs); Michael Erlank 200* (301); Jade de Klerk 3/58 (15.5 overs)		461/8d (118 overs); Lesiba Ngoepe 154 (206); Ziyaad Abrahams 3/71 (26 overs)
98 (29.5 overs); Andile Mokgakane 24 (33); Alfred Mothoa 4/22 (8 overs)		37/2 (10 overs); Meeka-eel Prince 15 (26); Malcolm Nofal 1/2 (1 over)

North West won by 8 wickets
JB Marks Oval, Potchefstroom
Umpires: Mazizi Gampu and Arno Jacobs
Player of the match: Michael Erlank (KwaZulu-Natal Inland)

- KwaZulu-Natal Inland won the toss and elected to bat.
- Only 60 overs play was possible on day 1 due to rain.
- Muhammed Bulbulia (KwaZulu-Natal Inland) made his first-class debut.
- Points: North West 24.98, KwaZulu-Natal Inland 7.44

=== October ===
2–5 October 2025
Scorecard

Boland	v	Dolphins
156 (45.2 overs); Lehan Botha 45* (75); Tristan Luus 4/42 (10.2 overs)		346 (91.2 overs); Tshepang Dithole 116 (172); Glenton Stuurman 4/46 (18 overs)
452 (133.3 overs); Pieter Malan 157 (308); Eathan Bosch 3/60 (20.3 overs)		264/5 (67.4 overs); Bryce Parsons 63 (110); Aviwe Mgijima 2/37 (9.4 overs)

Dolphins won by 5 wickets
Boland Park, Paarl
Umpires: Siphelele Gasa and Andre Olivier
Player of the match: Tshepang Dithole (Dolphins)

- Boland won the toss and elected to bat.
- Points: Dolphins 24.92, Boland 5.12

2–5 October 2025
Scorecard

Western Province	v	Lions
193 (45 overs); Daniel Smith 102 (91); Evan Jones 4/58 (12.1 overs)		552/9d (169.4 overs); Connor Esterhuizen 175 (260); Kyle Simmonds 3/155 (42.4 overs)
225 (51 overs); Jiveshan Pillay 46 (83); Kwena Maphaka 3/26 (10 overs)

Lions won by an innings and 134 runs
Newlands Cricket Ground, Cape Town
Umpires: Abdoellah Steenkamp and Brad White
Player of the match: Connor Esterhuizen (Lions)

- Lions won the toss and elected to field.
- Richard Seletswane (Lions) made his first-class debut.
- Joshua van Heerden replaced Edward Moore as an injury substitute for Western Province during Western Province's first innings.
- Connor Esterhuizen (Lions) scored his maiden century in first-class cricket.
- Points: Lions 22.48, Western Province 3.86

2–5 October 2025
Scorecard

Warriors	v	KwaZulu-Natal Inland
140 (49 overs); Thomas Kaber 50* (122); Daryn Dupavillon 4/28 (14 overs)		185 (73.2 overs); Cameron Shekleton 59* (157); Matthew Boast 5/52 (18.2 overs)
269/6d (97 overs); Matthew Breetzke 101* (219); Sean Gilson 2/91 (24 overs)		136/4 (49 overs); Malcolm Nofal 59 (105); Wesley Bedja 3/31 (10 overs)

Match drawn
City Oval, Pietermaritzburg
Umpires: Arno Jacobs and Dennis Smith
Player of the match: Matthew Breetzke (Warriors)

- KwaZulu-Natal Inland won the toss and elected to field.
- Matthew Boast (Warriors) took his maiden five-wicket haul in first-class cricket.
- Points: Warriors 10, KwaZulu-Natal Inland 11.7

2–5 October 2025
Scorecard

North West	v	Titans
491/8d (134 overs); Meeka-eel Prince 142 (258); Schalk Engelbrecht 4/179 (50 overs)		262 (70.3 overs); Donovan Ferreira 71 (56); Onke Nyaku 3/40 (11.3 overs)
225/6d (44.4 overs); Lesiba Ngoepe 99 (124); Schalk Engelbrecht 3/63 (13.4 overs)		258 (88.3 overs); Keegan Petersen 119* (220); Wihan Lubbe 2/12 (10 overs)

North West won by 196 runs
JB Marks Oval, Potchefstroom
Umpires: Mazizi Gampu and Thomas Mokorosi
Player of the match: Wihan Lubbe (North West)

- North West won the toss and elected to bat.
- Jorich Van Schalkwyk (Titans) made his first-class debut.
- Meeka-eel Prince (North West) scored his maiden century in first-class cricket.
- Points: North West 25.38, Titans 5.24

8–11 October 2025
Scorecard

Dolphins	v	Lions
389 (119 overs); Tshepang Dithole 104 (185); Sipho Potsane 3/72 (20 overs)		619/7d (163 overs); Connor Esterhuizen 203 (332); Keshav Maharaj 3/105 (49 overs)
317/3 (68 overs); Romashan Pillay 94 (125); Codi Yusuf 2/39 (12 overs)

Match drawn
Kingsmead Cricket Ground, Durban
Umpires: Lubabalo Gcuma and Dennis Smith
Player of the match: Connor Esterhuizen (Lions)

- Dolphins won the toss and elected to bat.
- Semal Pillay (Dolphins) and Sipho Potsane (Lions) both made their first-class debuts.
- Connor Esterhuizen (Lions) scored his maiden double century in first-class cricket.
- Points: Dolphins 12.3, Lions 12.16

14–17 October 2025
Scorecard

North West	v	Western Province
284 (87 overs); Rubin Hermann 143 (168); Beuran Hendricks 5/70 (21 overs)		405 (106.1 overs); Joshua van Heerden 139 (234); Ruan de Swardt 5/59 (25 overs)
288 (83 overs); Rubin Hermann 108 (130); Dane Paterson 4/34 (13 overs)		173/2 (38.4 overs); Joshua van Heerden 78* (122); Shimane Alfred Mothoa 1/27 (7 overs)

Western Province won by 8 wickets
Newlands Cricket Ground, Cape Town
Umpires: Stephen Harris and Andre Olivier
Player of the match: Joshua van Heerden (Western Province)

- Western Province won the toss and elected to field.
- Rubin Hermann (North West) scored his maiden century in first-class cricket.
- Points: Western Province 25.24, North West 6.68

14–17 October 2025
Scorecard

Warriors	v	Boland
157 (44.2 overs); Modiri Litheko 39 (82); Glenton Stuurman 4/43 (16 overs)		274 (92.4 overs); Gavin Kaplan 110 (191); Duanne Olivier 5/66 (24 overs)
374 (101.2 overs); Jordan Hermann 156 (250); Lehan Botha 4/90 (23 overs)		223/7 (62 overs); Clyde Fortuin 87 (109); Matthew Boast 4/64 (19 overs)

Match drawn
St George's Park, Gqeberha
Umpires: Bongani Jele and Abongile Sodumo
Player of the match: Jordan Hermann (Warriors)

- Warriors won the toss and elected to bat.
- Only 26 overs play was possible on day 3 due to rain.
- Aphiwe Mnyanda replaced Wesley Bedja as an injury substitute for Warriors during Warriors' second innings.
- Points: Warriors 11.14, Boland 13.48

14–17 October 2025
Scorecard

Dolphins	v	KwaZulu-Natal Inland
400 (99.5 overs); Bryce Parsons 183 (262); Daryn Dupavillon 6/44 (21.5 overs)		493/9d (138.4 overs); Malcolm Nofal 183 (344); Eathan Bosch 2/69 (26 overs)
239/9 (83 overs); Khaya Zondo 58 (83); Hardus Viljoen 5/60 (26 overs)

Match drawn
Kingsmead Cricket Ground, Durban
Umpires: Lubabalo Gcuma and Warren Wyngaard
Player of the match: Bryce Parsons (Dolphins) and Malcolm Nofal (KwaZulu-Natal Inland)

- KwaZulu-Natal Inland won the toss and elected to field.
- Aryan Gopalan and Nqobani Mokoena (Dolphins) both made their first-class debuts.
- Points: Dolphins 14, KwaZulu-Natal Inland 14.28

14–17 October 2025
Scorecard

Titans	v	Lions
368 (103.2 overs); Jorich Van Schalkwyk 72 (112); Delano Potgieter 2/59 (14 overs)		386 (111.5 overs); Delano Potgieter 99 (196); Junior Dala 3/93 (19 overs)
158 (50.1 overs); Lhuan-dre Pretorius 37 (48); Siya Plaatjie 5/64 (15 overs)		141/1 (24.2 overs); Dominic Hendricks 65* (79); Jorich Van Schalkwyk 1/21 (3.2 overs)

Lions won by 9 wickets
Centurion Park, Centurion
Umpires: Siphelele Gasa and Brad White
Player of the match: Siya Plaatjie (Lions)

- Titans won the toss and elected to bat.
- Points: Lions 25.38, Titans 8.34

21–24 October 2025
Scorecard

Western Province	v	Dolphins
337 (99.4 overs); Valentine Kitime 102 (149); Okuhle Cele 5/81 (21.4 overs)		267 (82.1 overs); Marques Ackerman 80 (121); Dane Paterson 3/23 (16.1 overs)
148 (51.2 overs); Joshua van Heerden 50 (59); Bryce Parsons 6/41 (14 overs)		220/9 (59.5 overs); Eathan Bosch 59 (74); Kyle Simmonds 4/116 (26.5 overs)

Dolphins won by 1 wicket
Newlands Cricket Ground, Cape Town
Umpires: Mazizi Gampu and Dennis Smith
Player of the match: Eathan Bosch (Dolphins)

- Dolphins won the toss and elected to field.
- Valentine Kitime (Western Province) scored his maiden century in first-class cricket.
- Slade van Staden replaced Jason Smith as an injury substitute for Dolphins during Dolphins' second innings.
- Points: Dolphins 23.34, Western Province 8.74

21–24 October 2025
Scorecard

KwaZulu-Natal Inland	v	Boland
298 (94 overs); Malcolm Nofal 89 (183); Ayabulela Gqamane 3/38 (14 overs)		359 (129.3 overs); Gavin Kaplan 152 (278); Ziyaad Abrahams 3/35 (21.3 overs)
182 (77.2 overs); Malcolm Nofal 49 (69); Shaun von Berg 5/49 (26 overs)		124/1 (20.4 overs); Grant Roelofsen 82* (60); Chad Laycock 1/19 (5 overs)

Boland won by 9 wickets
City Oval, Pietermaritzburg
Umpires: Abdoellah Steenkamp and Brad White
Player of the match: Gavin Kaplan (Boland)

- Boland won the toss and elected to field.
- Points: Boland 23.92, KwaZulu-Natal Inland 5.96

21–24 October 2025
Scorecard

Lions	v	North West
239 (79.5 overs); Connor Esterhuizen 100* (195); Ruan de Swardt 3/18 (15 overs)		256 (72 overs); Dian Forrester 78* (133); Beyers Swanepoel 5/84 (33 overs)
163 (49.5 overs); Richard Seletswane 38 (112); Onke Nyaku 4/74 (11.5 overs)		147/2 (23.2 overs); Wihan Lubbe 67* (46); Siya Plaatjie 1/36 (4 overs)

North West won by 8 wickets
Wanderers Stadium, Johannesburg
Umpires: Arno Jacobs and Waldo Lategan
Player of the match: Wihan Lubbe (North West)

- North West won the toss and elected to field.
- Dian Forrester (North West) scored his 1,000th run in first-class cricket.
- Points: North West 23.12, Lions 6.78

21–24 October 2025
Scorecard

Warriors	v	Titans
244 (76.1 overs); Matthew Breetzke 113 (165); Duan Jansen 5/39 (23 overs)		228 (64 overs); Rivaldo Moonsamy 86 (102); Duanne Olivier 4/39 (16 overs)
251 (78 overs); Sinethemba Qeshile 60 (111); Neil Brand 3/54 (19 overs)		221 (66.3 overs); Rivaldo Moonsamy 63 (72); Aphiwe Mnyanda 4/52 (15 overs)

Warriors won by 46 runs
Centurion Park, Centurion
Umpires: Stephen Harris and Mthokozisi Shezi
Player of the match: Duanne Olivier (Warriors)

- Titans won the toss and elected to field.
- Keagan Lion-Cachet (Titans) made his first-class debut.
- Points: Warriors 22.88, Titans 6.56

=== December ===
9–12 December 2025
Scorecard

Western Province	v	KwaZulu-Natal Inland
290 (77 overs); Daniel Smith 61 (81); Sean Whitehead 5/66 (18 overs)		148 (57.5 overs); Sean Whitehead 46* (76); Kyle Simmonds 5/39 (20 overs)
201/6d (53 overs); Daniel Smith 93 (116); Sean Whitehead 5/53 (20 overs)		204 (63.1 overs); Yaseen Valli 58 (105); Josh Breed 3/39 (12 overs)

Western Province won by 139 runs
City Oval, Pietermaritzburg
Umpires: Lubabalo Gcuma and Dennis Smith

- Western Province won the toss and elected to bat.
- Only 67 overs play was possible on day 1 due to rain.
- Josh Breed, Mbulelo Dube and Kashief Josephs (Western Province) all made their first-class debuts.
- Chad Laycock replaced Michael Erlank as an injury substitute for KwaZulu-Natal Inland during Western Province's first innings.
- Points: Western Province 23.8, KwaZulu-Natal Inland 4

9–12 December 2025
Scorecard

Lions	v	Boland
374 (94.4 overs); Zubayr Hamza 115 (148); Ayabulela Gqamane 3/84 (15 overs)		278 (89.3 overs); Glenton Stuurman 71 (85); Bjorn Fortuin 3/47 (19 overs)
206/5d (41 overs); Connor Esterhuizen 62* (38); Shaun von Berg 3/60 (17 overs)		143/7 (52.5 overs); Clyde Fortuin 38 (98); Nqaba Peter 2/19 (7 overs)

Match drawn
Wanderers Stadium, Johannesburg
Umpires: Arno Jacobs and Abongile Sodumo

- Lions won the toss and elected to bat.
- Only 27 and 47 overs play was possible on day 1 and day 2 respectively, due to rain.
- Points: Lions 15.48, Boland 13.56

9–12 December 2025
Scorecard

Dolphins	v	Titans
125 (42 overs); Eathan Bosch 35* (60); Duan Jansen 4/39 (14 overs)		255 (57 overs); Dayyaan Galiem 91* (64); Okuhle Cele 4/68 (18 overs)
200 (38.5 overs); Tristan Luus 42 (25); Janco Smit 4/40 (7.5 overs)		72/1 (17.2 overs); Keegan Petersen 41* (55); Eathan Bosch 1/20 (7 overs)

Titans won by 9 wickets
Centurion Park, Centurion
Umpires: Bongani Jele and Andre Olivier

- Dolphins won the toss and elected to bat.
- Only 32.5 and 59.1 overs play was possible on day 1 and day 2 respectively, due to rain.
- Points: Titans 23.1, Dolphins 2.6

9–12 December 2025
Scorecard

North West	v	Warriors
160 (57 overs); Wihan Lubbe 35 (78); Matthew Boast 5/42 (17 overs)		387 (109 overs); Jordan Hermann 134 (220); Achille Cloete 2/26 (14 overs)
85 (37.1 overs); Lesiba Ngoepe 17 (37); Matthew Boast 2/14 (7 overs)

Warriors won by an innings and 142 runs
JB Marks Oval, Potchefstroom
Umpires: Siphelele Gasa and Stephen Harris

- North West won the toss and elected to bat.
- Only 45 overs play was possible on day 1 due to rain.
- Points: Warriors 24.76, North West 4.2

=== January ===
31 January – 3 February 2026
Scorecard

Dolphins	v	North West
274 (73.1 overs); Nqobani Mokoena 72 (92); Alfred Mothoa 3/55 (16 overs)		335/8 (97 overs); Diego Rosier 146 (263); Eathan Bosch 2/11 (8 overs)

Match drawn
JB Marks Oval, Potchefstroom
Umpires: Abdoellah Steenkamp and Warren Wyngaard

- North West won the toss and elected to field.
- Carl Fryer (North West) made his first-class debut.
- Points: North West 14.7, Dolphins 3.48

=== February ===
1–4 February 2026
Scorecard

Western Province	v	Boland
533/9d (131.3 overs); Kyle Verreynne 204* (305); Imran Manack 3/98 (25.3 overs)		163 (63.3 overs); Jhedli van Briesies 41 (72); Kyle Simmonds 5/66 (23.3 overs)
		229 (86.5 overs) (f/o); Lehan Botha 53 (93); Tshepo Moreki 4/46 (14.5 overs)

Western Province won by an innings and 141 runs
Boland Park, Paarl
Umpires: Marais Erasmus and Mazizi Gampu

- Western Province won the toss and elected to bat.
- Points: Western Province 26.02, Boland 3.26

1–4 February 2026
Scorecard

Lions	v	Warriors
305 (99 overs); Bjorn Fortuin 112* (182); Matthew Boast 5/90 (23 overs)		198 (77 overs); JP King 54 (101); Lutho Sipamla 5/53 (17 overs)
219/5d (59 overs); Wiaan Mulder 89* (108); Senuran Muthusamy 2/43 (15 overs)		116/3 (47 overs); Jordan Hermann 26 (62); Bjorn Fortuin 2/35 (17 overs)

Match drawn
St George's Park, Gqeberha
Umpires: Thomas Mokorosi and Brad White

- Lions won the toss and elected to bat.
- Points: Warriors 14.1, Lions 11.96

1–4 February 2026
Scorecard

KwaZulu-Natal Inland	v	Titans
286 (101.2 overs); Malcolm Nofal 92 (198); Janco Smit 4/46 (20 overs)		541 (121.1 overs); Neil Brand 178 (292); Ziyaad Abrahams 5/86 (22 overs)
333 (96.2 overs); Matthew Urquhart 98 (135); Simon Harmer 4/136 (40.2 overs)		79/4 (18 overs); Keegan Petersen 29 (36); Sean Whitehead 3/31 (8 overs)

Titans won by 6 wickets
City Oval, Pietermaritzburg
Umpires: Siphelele Gasa and Abongile Sodumo

- KwaZulu-Natal Inland won the toss and elected to bat.
- Matthew Urquhart (KwaZulu-Natal Inland) made his first-class debut.
- Points: Titans 27.12, KwaZulu-Natal Inland 5.72

9–12 February 2026
Scorecard

North West	v	Boland
434 (115.4 overs); Dian Forrester 123* (188); Aviwe Mgijima 5/97 (26.4 overs)		416 (120.5 overs); Lehan Botha 139 (189); Caleb Seleka 6/99 (36 overs)
304/9d (73.4 overs); Rubin Hermann 101 (135); Aviwe Mgijima 4/76 (19 overs)		323/5 (68.2 overs); Gavin Kaplan 144* (201); Dian Forrester 3/54 (10.2 overs)

Boland won by 5 wickets
Boland Park, Paarl
Umpires: Arno Jacobs and Andre Olivier

- North West won the toss and elected to bat.
- Ludwich Schuld (North West) made his first-class debut.
- Lehan Botha (Boland) scored his maiden century in first-class cricket.
- Caleb Seleka (North West) took his maiden five-wicket haul in first-class cricket.
- Imran Manack replaced Siyabonga Mahima as an injury substitute for Boland during North West's second innings.
- Points: Boland 23.1, North West 6.2

9–12 February 2026
Scorecard

Western Province	v	Titans
241 (58.2 overs); Daniel Smith 40 (39); Junior Dala 3/45 (10 overs)		306 (102.5 overs); Rivaldo Moonsamy 90 (182); Dane Paterson 4/77 (22 overs)
228 (58.4 overs); Kyle Simmonds 72* (89); Duan Jansen 5/59 (15.4 overs)		165/1 (39 overs); Lesego Senokwane 86* (131); Dane Paterson 1/20 (9 overs)

Titans won by 9 wickets
Newlands Cricket Ground, Cape Town
Umpires: Marais Erasmus and Warren Wyngaard

- Titans won the toss and elected to field.
- Points: Titans 23.9, Western Province 6.82

9–12 February 2026
Scorecard

Warriors	v	Dolphins
380 (106.3 overs); Senuran Muthusamy 113 (144); Tristan Luus 5/77 (20.3 overs)		253 (65.4 overs); Hanu Viljoen 69 (111); Gideon Peters 5/67 (14 overs)
237/5d (54.2 overs); Matthew Breetzke 91* (128); Eathan Bosch 4/25 (12.2 overs)		370/8 (92.3 overs); Semal Pillay 111 (163); Kerwin Mungroo 2/40 (12 overs)

Dolphins won by 2 wickets
Kingsmead Cricket Ground, Durban
Umpires: Lubabalo Gcuma and Thomas Mokorosi

- Dolphins won the toss and elected to field.
- Gomolemo Phiri and T Saulez both made their first-class debuts after they replacing Bryce Parsons and Okuhle Cele respectively, as an injury substitute for Dolphins during Warriors first innings.
- Semal Pillay (Dolphins) scored his maiden century in first-class cricket.
- Points: Dolphins 22.06, Warriors 9.1

9–12 February 2026
Scorecard

KwaZulu-Natal Inland	v	Lions
63 (22.5 overs); Ntando Zuma 13 (18); Wiaan Mulder 7/6 (6.5 overs)		558/5d (107.4 overs); Wiaan Mulder 115 (111); Malcolm Nofal 1/37 (4 overs)
225 (73.3 overs); Sean Gilson 57 (99); Wiaan Mulder 5/39 (17 overs)

Lions won by an innings and 270 runs
Wanderers Stadium, Johannesburg
Umpires: Stephen Harris and Bongani Jele

- KwaZulu-Natal Inland won the toss and elected to bat.
- Points: Lions 27.98, KwaZulu-Natal Inland 2

== Division 2 Fixtures ==
=== September ===
25–28 September 2025
Scorecard

Limpopo	v	Easterns
341 (95.2 overs); Emmanuel Motswiri 69 (91); Jesse Albanie 3/66 (14.2 overs)		570/9d (147.2 overs); Christopher Britz 273* (410); Atwell Mokgoloboto 5/138 (38 overs)
166 (57.1 overs); Christoffel Klijnhans 45 (80); Martin Khumalo 3/37 (10 overs)

Easterns won by an innings and 63 runs
Willowmoore Park, Benoni
Umpires: Jan Erasmus and Khatso Ntuli
Player of the match: Christopher Britz (Easterns)

- Easterns won the toss and elected to field.
- Matt Hollard (Limpopo) made his first-class debut.
- Atwell Mokgoloboto (Limpopo) took his maiden five-wicket haul in first-class cricket.
- Points: Easterns 24.8, Limpopo 4.82

=== October ===
2–5 October 2025
Scorecard

Easterns	v	Knights
59 (31.1 overs); Andrew Rasemene 18 (41); Johan van Dyk 4/6 (8.1 overs)		197 (59.4 overs); Gihahn Cloete 60* (115); Ernest Kemm 5/73 (20 overs)
165 (63.2 overs); Jurie Snyman (144); Dane Piedt 5/44 (19 overs)		31/2 (10 overs); Jacques Snyman 11 (21); Amaan Khan 1/14 (5 overs)

Knights won by 8 wickets
Mangaung Oval, Bloemfontein
Umpires: Stacy Lackay and Jurie Sadler

- Easterns won the toss and elected to bat.
- Points: Knights 21.94, Easterns 4

2–5 October 2025
Scorecard

Mpumalanga	v	Northern Cape
463 (118.5 overs); Muhammed Mayet 269 (337); Joseph van Rensburg 4/89 (24 overs)		219 (80.3 overs); Ronan Herrmann 102 (156); Aubrey Swanepoel 3/28 (16 overs)
177 (39.4 overs); Zakir Kathrada 85 (99); Odirile Modimokoane 3/53 (16 overs)		163 (59 overs); Charl Prinsloo 39 (72); Kurtlyn Mannikam 5/29 (19 overs)

Mpumalanga won by 258 runs
De Beers Diamond Oval, Kimberley
Umpires: Roger Burne and Heinrich Killian

- Mpumalanga won the toss and elected to bat.
- Charl Prinsloo (Northern Cape) and Ricus Kramm (Mpumalanga) both made their first-class debuts.
- Muhammed Mayet (Mpumalanga) scored his maiden double century in first-class cricket.
- Points: Mpumalanga 26.12, Northern Cape 3.38

2–5 October 2025
Scorecard

South Western Districts	v	Limpopo
490 (157 overs); George Van Heerden 221* (319); Don Radebe 3/81 (28 overs)		173 (57.1 overs); Sizwe Masondo 43 (67); Liam Alder 4/24 (12 overs)
		156 (66.1 overs) (f/o); Ludwig Kaestner 56 (114); Tyrese Karelse 5/42 (15.1 overs)

South Western Districts won by an innings and 161 runs
Cricket Club Ground, Polokwane
Umpires: Gladman Gaseba and Dan van der Merwe
Player of the match: George Van Heerden (South Western Districts)

- South Western Districts won the toss and elected to bat.
- Ruve Lowe (Limpopo), Bennie Hansen and Jade Richter (South Western Districts) all made their first-class debuts.
- George Van Heerden (South Western Districts) scored his maiden double century in first-class cricket.
- Tyrese Karelse (South Western Districts) took his maiden five-wicket haul in first-class cricket.
- Points: South Western Districts 23.58, Limpopo 2.46

9–12 October 2025
Scorecard

Northern Cape	v	Border
236 (66.5 overs); James Ritchie 79 (164); Nico van Zyl 3/42 (12 overs)		314 (122 overs); Nathan Roux 100 (212); Ethan Frosler 4/72 (19 overs)
150 (61.2 overs); Ronan Hermann 45 (35); Kgaudisa Molefe 4/11 (9.2 overs)		74/2 (12.5 overs); Jerome Bossr 40* (45); Charl Prinsloo 1/20 (4 overs)

Border won by 8 wickets
Buffalo Park, East London
Umpires: Waldo Lategan and Mthokozisi Shezi

- Northern Cape won the toss and elected to bat.
- Tristan van Rensburg (Northern Cape) made his first-class debut.
- Nathan Roux (Border) scored his maiden century in first-class cricket.
- Points: Border 23.04, Northern Cape 5.72

16–19 October 2025
Scorecard

Mpumalanga	v	South Western Districts
264 (85.5 overs); Benjamin van Niekerk 68 (106); Zack Momberg 5/54 (15 overs)		510 (138.3 overs); Kyle Jacobs 122 (160); Kurtlyn Mannikam 7/169 (41.3 overs)
234 (84.1 overs); Gareth Dukes 84* (73); Banele Cele 4/24 (11.1 overs)

South Western Districts won by an innings and 12 runs
Recreation Ground, Oudtshoorn
Umpires: Willhelm Nell and Keagan Williams

- South Western Districts won the toss and elected to field.
- Zack Momberg (South Western Districts) took his maiden five-wicket haul on his first-class debut.
- B Brokensha made his first-class debut after replacing Themba Maupa as an injury substitute for Mpumalanga during South Western Districts' first innings.
- Points: South Western Districts 25.52, Mpumalanga 4.28

16–19 October 2025
Scorecard

Limpopo	v	Knights
223 (75.3 overs); Christoffel Klijnhans 55 (111); Johannes van Dyk 4/41 (14.3 overs)		535/8d (142 overs); Richard Maree 134 (233); Marcello Piedt 2/59 (22 overs)
213 (75.4 overs); Marcello Piedt 73 (43); Dane Piedt 4/86 (32 overs)

Knights won by an innings and 99 runs
Mangaung Oval, Bloemfontein
Umpires: Jan Erasmus and Jurie Sadler
Player of the match: Richard Maree (Knights)

- Limpopo won the toss and elected to bat.
- Seth Fledermaus and Richard Maree (Knights) both made their first-class debuts.
- Richard Maree (Knights) scored his maiden century in first-class cricket.
- Points: Knights 24.34, Limpopo 3.46

16–19 October 2025
Scorecard

Easterns	v	Border
346 (87.2 overs); Grant Thomson 112 (126); Chad Classen 4/59 (13.2 overs)		255 (84.1 overs); Jan Hardus Coetzer 77 (127); Ernest Kemm 6/105 (34.1 overs)
285/8d (80 overs); Andrew Rasemene 52* (81); Nico van Zyl 3/69 (18 overs)		170 (55.2 overs); Mncedisi Malika 102 (131); Ernest Kemm 6/67 (24 overs)

Eastern won by 206 runs
Willowmoore Park, Benoni
Umpires: Muhammed Jooma and Bongani Ntshebe

- Border won the toss and elected to field.
- Jaden Govender (Easterns) made his first-class debut.
- Points: Easterns 24.92, Border 7.1

=== December ===
4–7 December 2025
Scorecard

Mpumalanga	v	Easterns
304/8d (82.3 overs); Jon Hinrichsen 58 (52); Ernest Kemm 5/89 (33 overs)		215 (41.5 overs); Tumelo Simelane 67 (51); Jon Hinrichsen 5/57 (15 overs)
23/1 (8.4 overs); Zakir Kathrada 9 (17); Amaan Khan 1/11 (4.4 overs)

Match drawn
Uplands College, White River
Umpires: Roger Burne and Muhammad Jooma

- Easterns won the toss and elected to field.
- No play was possible on day 1 and 2 due to rain and wet outfield.
- Points: Mpumalanga 14.08, Easterns 11.3

11–14 December 2025
Scorecard

Knights	v	Northern Cape
203/7d (63.1 overs); Gihahn Cloete 86 (109); Tshepo Ntuli 3/42 (17.1 overs)		254 (79.1 overs); Garnett Tarr 41 (60); Dane Piedt 3/85 (27 overs)
147 (69.2 overs); Richard Maree 78 (203); Tshepo Ntuli 6/52 (31.2 overs)		55/6 (21.3 overs); Nonelela Yikha 15 (25); Dane Piedt 4/31 (10.3 overs)

Match drawn
De Beers Diamond Oval, Kimberley
Umpires: Heinrich Killian and Waldo Lategan

- Knights won the toss and elected to bat.
- Only 53, 10.1 and 64 overs play was possible on day 1, 2 and day 3 respectively, due to rain.
- Sithembile Langa replaced Johannes van Dyk as an injury substitute for Knights during their second innings.
- Points: Knights 12.06, Northern Cape 12.08

11–14 December 2025
Scorecard

Limpopo	v	Border
384/8d (116.1 overs); Ludwig Kaestner 148 (252); Michael Copeland 3/59 (18.5 overs)		150/2 (50.1 overs); Wian Ruthven 70* (132); Irvin Modimokoane 2/13 (11 overs)

Match drawn
Cricket Club Ground, Polokwane
Umpires: Khawulani Ntuli and Mthokozisi Shezi

- Limpopo won the toss and elected to bat.
- No play was possible on day 1 and 4 due to rain.
- Tylor Trenoweth (Limpopo), Wian Ruthven and Thozama Totana (Border) all made their first-class debuts.
- Ludwig Kaestner (Limpopo) scored his maiden century in first-class cricket.
- Points: Limpopo 11.22, Border 9

18–21 December 2025
Scorecard

South Western Districts	v	Border
423 (141.4 overs); Ruan Terblanche 161 (290); Nico van Zyl 3/50 (22 overs)		154 (33.4 overs); Wian Ruthven 56 (67); Jade Richter 4/51 (9.4 overs)
37/1 (14.4 overs); Yaseen Valli 23* (47); Nico van Zyl 1/15 (5 overs)		308 (113.2 overs) (f/o); Jan Coetzer 54 (133); Liam Alder 5/93 (48.2 overs)

South Western Districts won by 9 wickets
Recreation Ground, Oudtshoorn
Umpires: Andre Olivier and Keagan Williams

- South Western Districts won the toss and elected to bat.
- Mathew Fourie replaced Thozama Totana as an injury substitute for Border during South Western Districts' first innings.
- Christiaan du Toit made his first-class debut after replacing Mncedisi Malika as an injury substitute for Border during South Western Districts' first innings.
- Liam Alder (South Western Districts) took his maiden five-wicket haul in first-class cricket.
- Points: South Western Districts 24.28, Border 4.08

=== January ===
8–11 January 2026
Scorecard

Border	v	Mpumalanga
491/8d (153 overs); Wian Ruthven 194 (296); Smangaliso Nhlebela 3/125 (38 overs)		196 (70.4 overs); Benjamin van Niekerk 57 (123); Kgaudisa Molefe 4/42 (19.4 overs)
		340/8 (140 overs) (f/o); Muhammed Mayet 103 (351); Lihle Sizani 2/30 (14 overs)

Match drawn
Buffalo Park, East London
Umpires: Gladman Gaseba and Godwin Von Willingh

- Border won the toss and elected to bat.
- Alindile Mhletywa replaced Michael Copeland as an injury substitute for Border during their first innings.
- Wian Ruthven (Border) scored his maiden century in first-class cricket.
- Points: Border 15.12, Mpumalanga 8.92

8–11 January 2026
Scorecard

South Western Districts	v	Northern Cape
282/9d (90 overs); Liam Alder 84 (94); Tshepo Ntuli 5/135 (40 overs)		134 (44.4 overs); Romano Terblanche 25 (41); Liam Alder 5/56 (17.4 overs)
139 (45.2 overs); Jade Richter 35 (46); Odirile Modimokoane 5/35 (12.2 overs)		289/3 (92.3 overs); Ronan Herrmann 140* (260); Pheko Moletsane 3/61 (15 overs)

Northern Cape won by 7 wickets
De Beers Diamond Oval, Kimberley
Umpires: Willhelm Nell and Jurie Sadler

- South Western Districts won the toss and elected to bat.
- Odirile Modimokoane (Northern Cape) took his maiden five-wicket haul in first-class cricket.
- Points: Northern Cape 20, South Western Districts 7.64

15–18 January 2026
Scorecard

South Western Districts	v	Knights
194 (71.3 overs); Liam Alder 68 (78); Malusi Siboto 4/33 (21 overs)		171 (57.1 overs); Patrick Botha 59 (108); Merrick Brett 5/25 (15.1 overs)
121 (43 overs); Yaseen Valli 38 (63); Johannes van Dyk 6/28 (13 overs)		146/3 (46 overs); Ruan Haasbroek 51* (80); Banele Cele 1/15 (5 overs)

Knights won by 7 wickets
Mangaung Oval, Bloemfontein
Umpires: Heinrich Killian and Jurie Sadler

- South Western Districts won the toss and elected to bat.
- Ross Boast (Knights) made his first-class debut.
- Points: Knights 21.42, South Western Districts 5.88

15–18 January 2026
Scorecard

Northern Cape	v	Easterns
204 (76 overs); Ruan van Rooyen 48* (103); Thabiso Ndlela 3/26 (9 overs)		424 (112.4 overs); Dewan Marais 180* (260); Romano Terblanche 3/71 (19 overs)
174 (43.2 overs); Ronan Herrmann 69 (46); Thabiso Ndlela 3/3 (2.2 overs)

Easterns won by an innings and 46 runs
Willowmoore Park, Benoni
Umpires: Jan Erasmus and Evan van der Merwe

- Northern Cape won the toss and elected to bat.
- Liam Doherty, Joseph van Rensburg and Ruan van Rooyen (Northern Cape) all made their first-class debuts.
- Charl Prinsloo replaced Joseph van Rensburg as an injury substitute for Northern Cape during their first innings.
- Dewan Marais (Easterns) scored his maiden century in first-class cricket.
- Points: Easterns 25.16, Northern Cape 5.08

22–25 January 2026
Scorecard

Knights	v	Border
326 (109 overs); Ruan Haasbroek 174 (251); Nico van Zyl 5/68 (25 overs)		142 (71.3 overs); Nathan Roux 42 (119); Sithembile Langa 5/33 (16)
174/5d (39 overs); Gihahn Cloete 83 (92); Alindile Mhletywa 2/24 (8 overs)		270 (117.5 overs); Wian Ruthven 95 (183); Seth Fledermaus 3/43 (25.5 overs)

Knights won by 88 runs
Buffalo Park, East London
Umpires: Jan Erasmus and Bongani Ntshebe

- Border won the toss and elected to field.
- Points: Knights 23.98, Border 3

22–25 January 2026
Scorecard

Mpumalanga	v	Limpopo

Match abandoned
Uplands College, White River

- No toss.
- No play was possible due to rain.
- Points: Mpumalanga 5, Limpopo 5

29 January – 1 February 2026
Scorecard

Easterns	v	South Western Districts
340 (122.5 overs); Dewan Marais 79 (90); Kyle Jacobs 3/24 (5 overs)		224 (61.4 overs); George Van Heerden 41 (63); Andrew Rasemene 5/50 (11.3 overs)
267 (106.3 overs); Grant Thomson 89 (205); Pheko Moletsane 4/52 (24.3 overs)		146 (45.3 overs); Liam Alder 40 (24); Ernest Kemm 6/55 (22.3 overs)

Easterns won by 237 runs
Recreation Ground, Oudtshoorn
Umpires: Roger Burne and Keagan Williams

- South Western Districts won the toss and elected to field.
- Points: Easterns 23.26, South Western Districts 3.48

29 January – 1 February 2026
Scorecard

Limpopo	v	Northern Cape
178 (56.4 overs); Christoffel Klijnhans 97 (98); Charl Prinsloo 3/27 (12 overs)		442/9d (159.2 overs); Nonelela Yikha 107 (287); Atwell Mokgoloboto 3/99 (39.2 overs)
133 (70 overs); Christoffel Klijnhans 39 (66); Tshepo Ntuli 4/61 (32 overs)

Northern Cape won by an innings and 131 runs
Cricket Club Ground, Polokwane
Umpires: Muhammad Jooma and Willhelm Nell

- Limpopo won the toss and elected to bat.
- Shelton Ngobeni (Limpopo) made his first-class debut.
- Points: Northern Cape 23.78, Limpopo 2.56

29 January – 1 February 2026
Scorecard

Mpumalanga	v	Knights
179 (58.5 overs); Aubrey Swanepoel 51 (87); Tiaan van Vuuren 4/28 (11.5 overs)		282 (80.4 overs); Ross Boast 81 (128); Themba Maupa 3/55 (20 overs)
239 (66.1 overs); Benjamin van Niekerk 81 (130); Tiaan van Vuuren 5/63 (17 overs)		137/1 (24.3 overs); Gihahn Cloete 93* (65); Themba Maupa 1/22 (6 overs)

Knights won by 9 wickets
Uplands College, White River
Umpires: Bongani Ntshebe and Mthokozisi Shezi

- Mpumalanga won the toss and elected to bat.
- Tetelo Maphaka (Mpumalanga) made his first-class debut.
- Kurtlyn Mannikam replaced Aubrey Swanepoel as an injury substitute for Mpumalanga during first innings of Knights.
- Tiaan van Vuuren (Knights) took his maiden five-wicket haul in first-class cricket.
- Points: Knights 23.64, Mpumalanga 5.58

== Finals ==
=== Division 1 Final ===
18–22 February 2026
Scorecard

Warriors	v	Lions
305 (88 overs); JP King 123 (230); Delano Potgieter 3/34 (12 overs)		295 (100 overs); Delano Potgieter 88* (181); Matthew Boast 5/58 (20 overs)
95 (29.4 overs); Jordan Hermann 25 (25); Codi Yusuf 5/34 (10 overs)		111/2 (17 overs); Zubayr Hamza 69* (47); Patrick Kruger 1/31 (4 overs)

Lions won by 8 wickets
Wanderers Stadium, Johannesburg
Umpires: Lubabalo Gcuma and Bongani Jele

- Lions won the toss and elected to field.
- Matthew de Villiers replaced Modiri Litheko as an injury substitute for Warriors during their first innings.

=== Division 2 Final ===
6–10 February 2026
Scorecard

Easterns	v	Knights
277 (104 overs); Dewan Marais 62* (161); Malusi Siboto 4/54 (25 overs)		479/8 (140 overs); Gihahn Cloete 210 (367); Tumelo Simelane 4/91 (32 overs)

Match drawn
Mangaung Oval, Bloemfontein
Umpires: Waldo Lategan and Mthokozisi Shezi

- Knights won the toss and elected to field.
- Only 19.5 overs play was possible on day 3 due to rain.
- No play was possible on day 5 due to rain.
- Gihahn Cloete (Knights) scored his maiden double century in first-class cricket.

== See also ==
- 2025–26 CSA T20 Knock-Out Competition
- 2025–26 CSA T20 Challenge
- 2025–26 CSA One-Day Cup
