= 2024 CSA T20 Challenge (March) =

Cricket tournament

2023–24 CSA T20 Challenge
- Dates: 8 March – 28 April 2024
- Administrator: Cricket South Africa
- Cricket format: Twenty20
- Tournament format(s): Round-robin and knockout
- Host: South Africa
- Champions: Lions (5th title)
- Runners-up: Dolphins
- Participants: 8
- Matches: 58
- Most runs: Matthew Breetzke (467)
- Most wickets: Beyers Swanepoel (21)

The 2023–24 CSA T20 Challenge was a Twenty20 cricket tournament that took place in South Africa. It was the twentieth season of the CSA T20 Challenge, organized by Cricket South Africa. The tournament ran from 8 March to 28 April 2024. Titans were the defending champions.

== Teams ==
Team	City	Captain	Coach
Gbets Rocks Boland	Paarl	(South Africa) Pieter Malan	Justin Ontong
Hollywoodbets Dolphins	Durban	Keshav Maharaj	Imraan Khan
DP World Lions	Johannesburg	Bjorn Fortuin	Russell Domingo
AET Tuskersa		Michael Erlank	Grant Morgan
North West Dragons	Potchefstroom	Senuran Muthusamy	Craig Alexander
Momentum Multiply Titans	Centurion	Aiden Markram	Mandla Mashimbyi
Dafabet Warriors	Gqeberha	Matthew Breetzke	(South Africa) Robin Peterson
Western Province	Cape Town	Kyle Verreynne	Salieg Nackerdien

== Squads ==
Dolphins	Lions	AET Tuskersa	North West	Rocks (Boland)	Titans	Warriors	Western Province
Keshav Maharaj (c); Grant Roelofsen; Bryce Parsons; Eathan Bosch; Khaya Zondo; Marques Ackerman; Jon-Jon Smuts; Brad Porteous, Jason Smith; Andile Phehlukwayo; Andile Simelane, Prenelan Subrayen, Ottniel Baartman; Okuhle Cele, Daryn Dupavillon; Tristan Luus, Odirile Modimokoane, Tshepang Dithole, SJ Erwee	Ryan Rickelton; Reeza Hendricks; Temba Bavuma; Rassie van der Dussen; Mitchell van Buuren; Wiaan Mulder; Evan Jones; Bjorn Fortuin; Tshepo Moreki; Codi Yusuf; Kwena Maphaka; Zubayr Hamza; Connor Esterhuizen; Junaid Dawood; Nqaba Peter; Kagiso Rabada; Delano Potgieter; Lutho Sipamla	Dilivio Ridgaard Michael Erlank(c), Kurtlyn Mannikam Cameron Delport, Malcolm Nofal, Cameron Shekleton(w), Kyle Nipper, Smangaliso Nhlebela, Keith Dudgeon, Mbulelo Budaza, Mondli Khumalo, Alindile Mhletywa, Thamsanqa Kumalo	Rubin Hermann Meeka eel Prince(w) Migael Pretorius Raynard van Tonder Senuran Muthusamy(c) Lesiba Ngoepe Wihan Lubbe Ruan de Swardt Bamanye Xenxe Caleb Seleka Kerwin Mungroo Lesego Senokwane Duan Jansen Gideon Peters Irvin Modimokoane Grant Mokoena	Pieter Malan(c), Janneman Malan, Keegan Petersen, Clyde Fortuin(w), Michael Copeland, Aviwe Mgijima, Ferisco Adams, Shaun von Berg, Hardus Viljoen, Imran Manack, Siyabonga Mahima, Jevano Baron, Achille Cloete, Glenton Stuurman, Akhona Mnyaka, Christiaan Jonker	Dewald Brevis; Lungi Ngidi; Aiden Markram; Heinrich Klaasen; Donovan Ferreira; Neil Brand; Corbin Bosch; Junior Dala; Lizaad Williams; Tabraiz Shamsi; Steve Stolk; Sibonelo Makhanya; Rivaldo Moonsamy; Dayyaan Galiem; Lhuan-dre Pretorius; Tladi Bokako; Ayabulela Gqamane; Aaron Phangiso; Jack Lees; Matthew Boast	Matthew Breetzke(c) Jiveshan Pillay, Jordan Hermann, Marco Jansen, Tristan Stubbs, Patrick Kruger, Sinethemba Qeshile(w), Andile Mogakane, Beyers Swanepoel, Nealan van Heerden, Siya Simetu Anrich Nortje, Shimane Alfred Mothoa, Renaldo Meyer, Liam Alder, Aphiwe Mnyanda	Kyle Verreynne (Captain); Tony de Zorzi; Abdallah Bayoumy; Beuran Hendricks (Vice Captain); Dane Paterson; Daniel Smith; Gavin Kaplan; George Linde; Kyle Simmonds; Mihlali Mpongwana; Nandre Burger; Wayne Parnell; Mthiwekhaya Nabe; Wesley Bedja; Eddie Moore; Onke Nyaku; David Bedingham; Jono Bird

== Points table ==
Pos	Team	Pld	W	L	T	NR	Pts	NRR
1	Lions	14	10	4	0	0	44	—
2	Dolphins	14	9	4	0	1	41	—
3	Warriors	14	9	5	0	0	39	—
4	Titans	14	7	5	1	1	36	—
5	Western Province	14	5	7	1	1	28	—
6	North West	14	5	6	0	3	27	—
7	Boland	14	4	9	0	1	19	—
8	AET Tuskersa	14	2	11	0	1	11	—

Source: ESPN Cricinfo

Advanced to the Semi-finals

== Fixtures ==
On 20 August 2023, Cricket South Africa confirmed the full schedule for the tournament.

8 March 2024
18:00 (N)
Scorecard

Warriors; 125 (20 overs)	v	Aet Tuskers; 88 (16.4 overs)
Jiveshan Pillay 29 (23); Smangaliso Nhlebela 3/17 (4)		Cameron Shekleton 23 (25); Marco Jansen 4/19 (3.4)

Warriors won by 37 runs
St George's Park, Gqeberha
Umpires: Arno Jacobs and Allahudien Paleker
Player of the match: Marco Jansen (Warriors)

- Aet Tuskers won the toss and decided to bowl
- Points: Warriors 5, KwaZulu-Natal Inland 0

8 March 2024
18:00 (N)
Scorecard

Dolphins; 148/8 (20 overs)	v	Western Province; 146/7 (20 overs)
Jonathan Bird 40 (30); Okuhle Cele 2/27 (4 overs)		Bradley Porteous 20 (19); Kyle Simmonds 2/18 (4 overs)

Western Province won by 2 runs
Kingsmead, Durban
Umpires: Bongani Jele and Abdoellah Steenkamp
Player of the match: Jonathan Bird (Western Province)

- Western Province won the toss and decided to bat
- Bradley Porteous (Dolphins) made his T20 debut.
- Points: Western Province 4, Dolphins 0

8 March 2024
18:00 (N)
Scorecard

Lions; 223/5 (20 overs)	v	Boland; 180/7 (20 overs)
Ryan Rickelton 75 (39); Hardus Viljoen 3/45 (4)		Janneman Malan 61 (41); Kwena Maphaka 3/22 (4)

Lions won by 43 runs
The Wanderers Stadium, Johannesburg
Umpires: Siphelele Gasa and Stephen Harris
Player of the match: Ryan Rickelton (Lions)

- Boland won the toss and decided to bowl first.
- Points: Lions 4, Boland 0

8 March 2024
18:00 (N)
Scorecard

Titans; 169/7 (20 overs)	v	North West; 156/8 (20 overs)
Aiden Markram 40 (30); Migael Pretorius 3/18 (4)		Raynard van Tonder 48 (33); Tabraiz Shamsi 3/18 (4)

Titans won by 13 runs
SuperSport Park, Centurion
Umpires: Lubabalo Gcuma and Brad White
Player of the match: Tabraiz Shamsi (Titans)

- North West won the toss and decided to bowl first.
- Jack Lees (Titans) and Irvin Modimokoane (North West) both made their T20 debut.
- Points: Titans 4, North West 0

10 March 2024
14:00
Scorecard

Boland; 126/9 (20 overs)	v	Titans; 127/6 (19.1 overs)
Clyde Fortuin 33 (28); Tabraiz Shamsi 4/23 (4 overs)		Sibonelo Makhanya 34 (25); Siyabonga Mahima 2/22 (4 overs); Michael Copeland 2/22 (4 overs)

Titans won by 4 wickets
Boland Park, Paarl
Umpires: Thomas Mokorosi and Abongile Sodumo

- Boland won the toss and elected to bat.
- Points: Titans 4, Boland 0

10 March 2024
14:00
Scorecard

KwaZulu-Natal (Inland); 115/7 (20 overs)	v	Western Province; 116/3 (12.3 overs)
Keith Dudgeon 26 (21); Kyle Simmonds 2/20 (4 overs)		Jonathan Bird 61* (33); Keith Dudgeon 2/22 (3 overs)

Western Province won by 7 wickets
Newlands, Cape Town
Umpires: Lauren Agenbag and Mazizi Gampu
Player of the match: Jonathan Bird (Western Province)

- KwaZulu-Natal Inland won the toss and elected to bat.
- Points: Western Province 5, KwaZulu-Natal Inland 0

10 March 2024
14:00
Scorecard

KwaZulu-Natal (Inland); 115/7 (20 overs)	v	Western Province; 116/3 (12.3 overs)
Keith Dudgeon 26 (21); Kyle Simmonds 2/20 (4 overs)		Jonathan Bird 61* (33); Keith Dudgeon 2/22 (3 overs)

Western Province won by 7 wickets
Newlands, Cape Town
Umpires: Lauren Agenbag and Mazizi Gampu
Player of the match: Jonathan Bird (Western Province)

- KwaZulu-Natal Inland won the toss and elected to bat.
- Points: Western Province 5, KwaZulu-Natal Inland 0

10 March 2024
14:00
Scorecard

KwaZulu-Natal (Inland); 115/7 (20 overs)	v	Western Province; 116/3 (12.3 overs)
Keith Dudgeon 26 (21); Kyle Simmonds 2/20 (4 overs)		Jonathan Bird 61* (33); Keith Dudgeon 2/22 (3 overs)

Western Province won by 7 wickets
Newlands, Cape Town
Umpires: Lauren Agenbag and Mazizi Gampu
Player of the match: Jonathan Bird (Western Province)

- KwaZulu-Natal Inland won the toss and elected to bat.
- Points: Western Province 5, KwaZulu-Natal Inland 0

10 March 2024
14:00
Scorecard

North West; 103 (18.2 overs)	v	Lions; 104/1 (10.4 overs)
Senuran Muthusamy 33 (26); Junaid Dawood 3/23 (4 overs)		Reeza Hendricks 57* (30); Bamanye Xenxe 1/22 (2 overs)

Lions won by 9 wickets
Absa Puk Oval, Potchefstroom
Umpires: Ryan Hendricks and Philip Vosloo

- North West won the toss and elected to bat.
- Points: Lions 5, North West 0

13 March 2024
18:00 (N)
Scorecard

Western Province; 188/7 (20 overs)	v	North West; 184/6 (20 overs)
Jonathan Bird 42 (29); Ruan de Swardt 3/23 (4 overs)		Rubin Hermann 90 (54); Kyle Simmonds 2/16 (4 overs)

Western Province won by 4 runs
Newlands, Cape Town
Umpires: Mazizi Gampu and Allahudien Paleker

- North West won the toss and elected to field.
- Points: Western Province 4, North West 0

13 March 2024
18:00 (N)
Scorecard

Lions; 155/5 (20 overs)	v	Dolphins; 159/6 (19.1 overs)
Temba Bavuma 53* (40); Okuhle Cele 2/21 (4 overs)		Bryce Parsons 62* (49); Delano Potgieter 3/25 (4 overs)

Dolphins won by 4 wickets
Kingsmead, Durban
Umpires: Stephen Harris and Brad White

- Dolphins won the toss and elected to field.
- Points: Dolphins 4, Lions 0

15 March 2024
18:00 (N)
Scorecard

Boland; 125/8 (20 overs)	v	Dolphins; 129/1 (14.3 overs)
Michael Copeland 35 (30); Prenelan Subrayen 2/19 (4 overs)		Grant Roelofsen 71* (45); Hardus Viljoen 1/33 (3.3 overs)

Dolphins won by 9 wickets
Boland Park, Paarl
Umpires: Thomas Mokorosi and Abdoellah Steenkamp

- Dolphins won the toss and elected to field.
- Points: Dolphins 5, Boland 0

15 March 2024
13:00
Scorecard

North West; 207/4 (20 overs)	v	KwaZulu-Natal (Inland); 82 (14.5 overs)
Rubin Hermann 102 (54); Mondli Khumalo 3/33 (4 overs)		Cameron Dean Shekleton 28 (26); Senuran Muthusamy 3/16 (4 overs)

North West won by 125 runs
City Oval, Pietermaritzburg
Umpires: Lubabalo Gcuma and Brad White

- KwaZulu-Natal Inland won the toss and elected to field.
- Ntando Zuma (KwaZulu-Natal Inland) made his T20 debut.
- Points: North West 5, KwaZulu-Natal Inland 0

15 March 2024
18:00 (N)
Scorecard

Lions; 183/5 (20 overs)	v	Titans; 182/6 (20 overs)
Wiaan Mulder 48 (32); Lizaad Williams 2/20 (4 overs)		Rivaldo Moonsamy 88 (52); Bjorn Fortuin 2/23 (4 overs)

Lions won by 1 runs
Wanderers Stadium, Johannesburg
Umpires: Dennis Smith and Abongile Sodumo

- Titans won the toss and elected to field.
- Lhuan-dre Pretorius (Titans) made his T20 debut.
- Points: Lions 4, Titans 0

17 March 2024
14:00
Scorecard

Warriors; 166/6 (20 overs)	v	Boland; 117 (16.4 overs)
Jiveshan Pillay 45 (29); Shaun von Berg 2/23 (4 overs)		Clyde Fortuin 33 (22); Beyers Swanepoel 4/16 (4 overs)

Warriors won by 32 runs (DLS method)
St George's Park, Gqeberha
Umpires: Arno Jacobs and Philip Vosloo

- Warriors won the toss and elected to bat.
- JP King (Warriors) made his T20 debut.
- Points: Warriors 5, Boland 0

17 March 2024
14:00
Scorecard

North West; 79/4 (13.2 overs)	v	Dolphins
Rubin Hermann 25 (19); JJ Smuts 2/11 (3 overs)

No result
Kingsmead, Durban
Umpires: Lubabalo Gcuma and Brad White

- North West won the toss and elected to bat.
- Points: North West 2, Dolphins 2

17 March 2024
14:00
Scorecard

Western Province; 127/9 (20 overs)	v	Lions; 51/3 (7 overs)
David Bedingham 37 (22); Lutho Sipamla 2/20 (4 overs)		Ryan Rickelton 22* (19); Mthiwekhaya Nabe 1/7 (1 overs)

Match tied (DLS method)
Wanderers Stadium, Johannesburg
Umpires: Mazizi Gampu and Bongani Jele

- Western Province won the toss and elected to bat.
- Points: Lions 4, Western Province 0

20 March 2024
18:00 (N)
Scorecard

Dolphins; 183/1 (14 overs)	v	Titans; 152/5 (14 overs)
Bryce Parsons 102* (48); David Wiese 1/24 (2 overs)		Joshua van Heerden 56 (35); Okuhle Cele 2/40 (3 overs)

Dolphins won by 31 runs
Centurion Park, Centurion
Umpires: Allahudien Paleker and Brad White

- Titans won the toss and elected to field.
- Points: Dolphins 4, Titans 0

21 March 2024
14:00
Scorecard

Western Province; 149/7 (20 overs)	v	Warriors; 151/2 (17.4 overs)
George Linde 46 (38); Siya Simetu 2/15 (4 overs)		Matthew Breetzke 53* (42); George Linde 1/17 (4 overs)

Warriors won by 8 wickets
St George's Park, Gqeberha
Umpires: Arno Jacobs and Abongile Sodumo

- Western Province won the toss and elected to bat.
- Points: Warriors 4, Western Province 0

21 March 2024
14:00
Scorecard

Boland; 146/6 (20 overs)	v	North West; 148/3 (16.5 overs)
Ferisco Adams 50* (39); Migael Pretorius 4/14 (4 overs)		Rubin Hermann 96* (56); Imran Manack 2/17 (4 overs)

North West won by 7 wickets
Absa Puk Oval, Potchefstroom
Umpires: Abdoellah Steenkamp and Philip Vosloo

- North West won the toss and elected to field.
- Adrian du Toit (Boland) made his T20 debut.
- Points: North West 4, Boland 0

23 March 2024
14:00
Scorecard

Titans; 147/7 (20 overs)	v	Western Province; 138/6 (19 overs)
Neil Brand 39* (26); Wayne Parnell 2/23 (4 overs); Beuran Hendricks 2/23 (4 overs)		Edward Moore 55 (52); David Wiese 4/20 (4 overs)

Match tied (DLS method)
Wanderers Stadium, Johannesburg
Umpires: Mazizi Gampu and Bongani Jele

- Western Province won the toss and elected to field.
- Points: Titans 3, Western Province 3

23 March 2024
18:00 (N)
Scorecard

Lions; 90/5 (15 overs)	v	KwaZulu-Natal (Inland); 94/2 (11.4 overs)
Wiaan Mulder 36* (38); Keith Dudgeon 4/5 (3 overs)		Cameron Delport 39 (28); Lutho Sipamla 1/12 (2 overs)

KwaZulu-Natal Inland won by 8 wickets
Wanderers Stadium, Johannesburg
Umpires: Lubabalo Gcuma and Allahudien Paleker

- KwaZulu-Natal Inland won the toss and elected to field.
- Points: KwaZulu-Natal Inland 5, Lions 0

24 March 2024
10:00
Scorecard

Dolphins; 158/4 (20 overs)	v	Boland; 163/6 (19.3 overs)
Marques Ackerman 50* (32); Glenton Stuurman 1/24 (4 overs)		Christiaan Jonker 40* (26); Daryn Dupavillon 2/33 (4 overs)

Boland won by 4 wickets
St George's Park, Gqeberha
Umpires: Dennis Smith and Philip Vosloo

- Boland won the toss and elected to field.
- Points: Boland 4, Dolphins 0

24 March 2024
14:00
Scorecard

Warriors; 186/5 (20 overs)	v	North West; 162/9 (20 overs)
Sinethemba Qeshile 51* (30); Caleb Seleka 2/33 (4 overs)		Lesiba Ngoepe 45* (25); JP King 2/13 (2 overs)

Warriors won by 24 runs
St George's Park, Gqeberha
Umpires: Stephen Harris and Ryan Hendricks

- Warriors won the toss and elected to bat.
- Points: Warriors 4, North West 0

27 March 2024
13:00
Scorecard

Western Province; 208/6 (20 overs)	v	KwaZulu-Natal (Inland); 160/7 (20 overs)
Edward Moore 101 (58); Mbulelo Budaza 3/41 (4 overs)		Kagiso Rapulana 60 (46); Juan James 2/12 (2 overs)

Western Province won by 48 runs
City Oval, Pietermaritzburg
Umpires: Siphelele Gasa and Arno Jacobs

- Western Province won the toss and elected to bat.
- Points: Western Province 5, KwaZulu-Natal Inland 0

27 March 2024
18:00 (N)
Scorecard

Warriors; 173/4 (20 overs)	v	Lions; 171/7 (20 overs)
Andile Mokgakane 73* (51); Lutho Sipamla 1/24 (3 overs)		Wiaan Mulder 43 (20); Alfred Mothoa 3/35 (4 overs)

Warriors won by 2 runs
Wanderers Stadium, Johannesburg
Umpires: Lubabalo Gcuma and Brad White

- Lions won the toss and elected to field.
- Points: Warriors 4, Lions 0

== Knockout stage ==
Semi-finals
1	Lions	134/2 (14.4 overs)
4	Titans	131/9 (20 overs)
2	Dolphins	166/5 (18 overs)
3	Warriors	161/4 (20 overs)

Final
SFW2	Lions	168/3 (17.4 overs)
SFW1	Dolphins	165/8 (20 overs)

=== Semi-finals ===
24 April 2024
Scorecard

Titans; 131/9 (18 overs)	v	Lions; 134/2 (14.4 overs)
Jack Lees 64* (43); Nqaba Peter 4/18 (4 overs)		Rassie van der Dussen 73* (45); David Wiese 1/17 (2 overs)

Lions won by 8 wickets (DLS method)
Wanderers Stadium, Johannesburg
Umpires: Stephen Harris and Bongani Jele

- Lions won the toss and elected to field.

25 April 2024
Scorecard

Warriors; 161/4 (20 overs)	v	Dolphins; 166/5 (18 overs)
Matthew Breetzke 38 (35); Eathan Bosch 1/14 (4 overs)		Khaya Zondo 49 (23); Siya Simetu 2/38 (4 overs)

Dolphins won by 5 wickets
Kingsmead Cricket Ground, Durban
Umpires: Lubabalo Gcuma and Arno Jacobs

- Dolphins won the toss and elected to field.

=== Final ===
28 April 2024
Scorecard

Dolphins; 165/8 (20 Overs)	v	Lions; 168/3 (17.4 Overs)
Jason Smith 51 (33); Codi Yusuf 2/16 (4)		Reeza Hendricks 73* (52); Andile Phehlukwayo 1/14 (2)

Lions won by 7 wickets
Wanderers Stadium, Johannesburg
Umpires: Lubabalo Gcuma and Allahudien Paleker

- Lions won the toss and elected to field first.

== Venues ==
Cape Town	Centurion	Durban	Pietermaritzburg
Newlands Cricket Ground	Centurion Park	Kingsmead Cricket Ground	City Oval
Capacity: 25,000	Capacity: 22,000	Capacity: 25,000	Capacity: 12,000
2024 CSA T20 Challenge (March) (South Africa)
Gqeberha	Johannesburg	Paarl	Cape Town
St George's Park Cricket Ground	Wanderers Stadium	Boland Park	Cape Town Stadium
Capacity: 19,000	Capacity: 34,000	Capacity: 10,000	Capacity: 57,000

== Broadcasting ==
While some matches were televised, non-televised Division 1 games were streamed on the SuperSport App Channel 244, ensuring fans didn't miss a moment of the action. Internationally, fans also followed the excitement on Fancode.
