= Rayyaan Rhode =

South African cricketer (born 1998)

Personal information
- Born: 2 November 1998 (age 28)
- Source: Cricinfo, 8 February 2020

Rayyaan Rhode (born 2 November 1998) is a South African cricketer. He made his first-class debut on 6 February 2020, for North West in the 2019–20 CSA 3-Day Provincial Cup. He made his List A debut on 9 February 2020, for North West in the 2019–20 CSA Provincial One-Day Challenge.
