= Nicholas Smit =

South African cricketer (born 1993)

Personal information
- Born: 24 February 1993 (age 33)
- Source: Cricinfo, 17 October 2019

Nicholas Smit (born 24 February 1993) is a South African cricketer. He made his first-class debut on 17 October 2019, for North West in the 2019–20 CSA 3-Day Provincial Cup, scoring 153 runs in the first innings. He made his List A debut on 20 October 2019, for North West in the 2019–20 CSA Provincial One-Day Challenge, where he also scored a century.
