= David Pryke =

South African cricketer (born 1970)

Personal information
- Full name: David John Pryke
- Born: 26 November 1970 (age 55); Welkom, Orange Free State, South Africa
- Batting: Right-handed
- Bowling: Right-arm fast-medium

Domestic team information
- Years: Team
- 1990/91–1996/97: Natal
- 1997/98–1999/00: North West
- 2000: Marylebone Cricket Club
- 2006/07: South Western Districts

Career statistics
Competition	First-class	List A
Matches	32	47
Runs scored	290	196
Batting average	15.26	17.81
100s/50s	–/–	–/–
Top score	48	20*
Balls bowled	4,655	2,068
Wickets	100	53
Bowling average	18.72	23.16
5 wickets in innings	5	1
10 wickets in match	1	–
Best bowling	6/27	5/32
Catches/stumpings	16/–	8/–
- Source: Cricinfo, 19 September 2021

David John Pryke (born 26 November 1970) is a South African former first-class cricketer. His former teams include South Western Districts.
