= Andrea Agathangelou =

South African cricketer

Personal information
- Full name: Andrea Peter Agathangelou
- Born: 16 November 1989 (age 36); Rustenburg, Transvaal Province, South Africa
- Nickname: Aggers
- Height: 1.9 m (6 ft 3 in)
- Batting: Right-handed
- Bowling: Right-arm leg break
- Role: Batsman

Domestic team information
- Years: Team
- 2007/08–2010/11: North West
- 2008/09: Lions
- 2011–2014: Lancashire
- 2015: Leicestershire
- 2016/17: South Western Districts
- 2016/17: Cape Cobras
- 2017/18–2018/19: Northerns
- 2017/18–2019/20: Titans
- 2018/19: Tshwane Spartans
- 2019/20: Limpopo
- 2019/20: Easterns

Career statistics
Competition	FC	LA	T20
Matches	88	58	21
Runs scored	5,819	1,715	282
Batting average	40.97	35.00	16.58
100s/50s	15/26	2/13	0/1
Top score	313	113	56*
Balls bowled	1,068	192	17
Wickets	15	1	1
Bowling average	43.66	215.00	23.00
5 wickets in innings	0	0	0
10 wickets in match	0	0	0
Best bowling	2/18	1/35	1/23
Catches/stumpings	122/0	33/1	5/–
- Source: Cricinfo, 14 July 2025

Andrea Agathangelou (born 16 November 1989) is a South African former cricketer. He qualified to play English county cricket as a non-overseas player courtesy of his Cypriot passport, which he has through his father's side. His father is from Cyprus and emigrated to South Africa. In October 2020, Agathangelou announced his retirement from cricket.

== Career ==
He joined Lancashire for a scholarship in 2010 and became a new signing for the club in 2011. He left the club at the end of the 2014 season after announcing his departure on Twitter. He made his Leicestershire first XI debut in a victorious County Championship match against Essex in May–June 2015, shortly after joining the club. His contract was not renewed at the end of the 2015 season.

On 7 January 2017, he scored his maiden century in List A cricket, batting for the Titans against the Warriors in the 2017–18 Momentum One Day Cup.

In June 2018, he was named in the squad for the Titans team for the 2018–19 season. In September 2018, he was named in the Titans' squad for the 2018 Abu Dhabi T20 Trophy. In September 2019, he was named in Limpopo's squad for the 2019–20 CSA Provincial T20 Cup.

In January 2020, in the 2019–20 CSA 3-Day Provincial Cup match against Boland, Agathangelou and Yaseen Valli made an opening partnership of 485 runs, breaking the previous record in a first-class match in South Africa of 424 runs set in the 1926–27 season. Agathangelou also scored his first triple century in match, finishing with 313 runs.
