= Eben Botha =

South African cricketer (born 1999)

Personal information
- Born: 26 April 1999 (age 27)
- Batting: Left-handed
- Bowling: Right-arm off spin
- Role: Batsman

Domestic team information
- Years: Team
- 2019-22: North West (cricket team)
- 2023-: Border (cricket team)
- Source: Cricinfo, 17 November 2019

Eben Botha (born 26 April 1999) is a South African cricketer. He made his List A debut on 17 November 2019, for North West in the 2019–20 CSA Provincial One-Day Challenge.

== Career ==
Botha made his first-class debut on 21 November 2019, for North West in the 2019–20 CSA 3-Day Provincial Cup. In April 2021, he was named in North West's squad, ahead of the 2021–22 cricket season in South Africa. He made his Twenty20 debut on 8 October 2021, for North West in the 2021–22 CSA Provincial T20 Knock-Out tournament.

He played for Coggeshall Town Cricket Club, Essex during the 2022 season scoring 1100 runs for the club, In the 2022-23 season, he played in Australia for New City Cricket Club scoring 41 on debut. He returned to Coggeshall for the 2023 season scoring 689 runs at an average of 35. For the 2023-24 season, Botha signed for Border (also known as Eastern Cape Iinyathi) and got a golden duck (cricket) with a high score of 35.
