= Tayo Walbrugh =

South African cricketer (born 1996)

Personal information
- Born: 10 July 1996 (age 30); Cape Town, South Africa
- Batting: Right-handed
- Bowling: Right-arm off-break
- Role: Wicket-keeper

Domestic team information
- Years: Team
- 2019/20: Western Province
- 2019/20: Cape Cobras
- Source: Cricinfo, 11 May 2025

Tayo Walbrugh (born 10 July 1996) is a South African cricketer. He made his List A debut on 19 October 2019, for Western Province in the 2019–20 CSA Provincial One-Day Challenge. He made his first-class debut on 24 October 2019, for Western Province in the 2019–20 CSA 3-Day Provincial Cup.
