= Francois Harley =

South African cricketer (born 1999)

Personal information
- Born: 10 October 1999 (age 27)
- Source: Cricinfo, 5 March 2020

Francois Harley (born 10 October 1999) is a South African cricketer. He made his first-class debut on 5 March 2020, for South Western Districts in the 2019–20 CSA 3-Day Provincial Cup.
