= Philip Visser =

South African cricketer (born 1998)

Personal information
- Born: 6 April 1998 (age 28)
- Source: Cricinfo, 22 December 2019

Philip Visser (born 6 April 1998) is a South African cricketer. He made his List A debut on 22 December 2019, for Free State in the 2019–20 CSA Provincial One-Day Challenge. He made his first-class debut on 20 February 2020, for Free State in the 2019–20 CSA 3-Day Provincial Cup.
