= Stuart Els =

South African cricketer (born 2001)

Personal information
- Born: 1 February 2001 (age 25)
- Source: Cricinfo, 1 February 2020

Stuart Els (born 1 February 2001) is a South African cricketer. He made his first-class debut on 30 January 2020, for Border in the 2019–20 CSA 3-Day Provincial Cup. He made his List A debut on 16 February 2020, for Border in the 2019–20 CSA Provincial One-Day Challenge.
