= Errin Ewerts =

South African cricketer (born 1988)

Errin Ewerts (born 25 May 1988) is a South African cricketer. He was a right-handed batsman and a right-arm off-break bowler who played for South Western Districts. He was born in Oudtshoorn.

Ewerts made a single first-class appearance for the side, during the SAA Three-Day Challenge competition of 2006–07, against Boland. He scored 22 runs in the first innings in which he batted, and 3 runs in the second.

Ewerts bowled 5 overs during the match, securing figures of 0-32.

In 2010 Ewerts captained the SWD Academy and represented South African Under 17 team while being a scholar at Oudtshoorn High School.

In 2011 he joined SWD which he had a one-day appearance in Rustenburg, South Africa.

In 2015 he participated in a game against the Northerns and in 2016 became team's captain.
