= Diego du Plessis =

South African cricketer (born 1997)

Personal information
- Born: 3 December 1997 (age 28)
- Source: Cricinfo, 16 November 2019

Diego du Plessis (born 3 December 1997) is a South African cricketer. He made his first-class debut on 14 November 2019, for Western Province in the 2019–20 CSA 3-Day Provincial Cup. He made his List A debut on 17 November 2019, for Western Province in the 2019–20 CSA Provincial One-Day Challenge.
