= Ruan Cronje =

South African cricketer (born 2001)

Personal information
- Born: 23 June 2001 (age 25)
- Source: Cricinfo, 14 February 2020

Ruan Cronje (born 23 June 2001) is a South African cricketer. He made his first-class debut on 13 February 2020, for KwaZulu-Natal in the 2019–20 CSA 3-Day Provincial Cup. He made his List A debut on 16 February 2020, for KwaZulu-Natal in the 2019–20 CSA Provincial One-Day Challenge.
