= Katleho Leokaoke =

South African cricketer (born 1996)

Personal information
- Full name: Katleho Kagiso Leokaoke
- Born: 12 January 1996 (age 30); Klerksdorp, South Africa
- Source: ESPNcricinfo, 1 September 2016

Katleho Leokaoke (born 12 January 1996) is a South African cricketer. He was included in the North West squad for the 2016 Africa T20 Cup. In September 2018, he was named in North West's squad for the 2018 Africa T20 Cup. In September 2019, he was named in North West's squad for the 2019–20 CSA Provincial T20 Cup.
