= Heath Richards =

South African cricketer (born 2001)

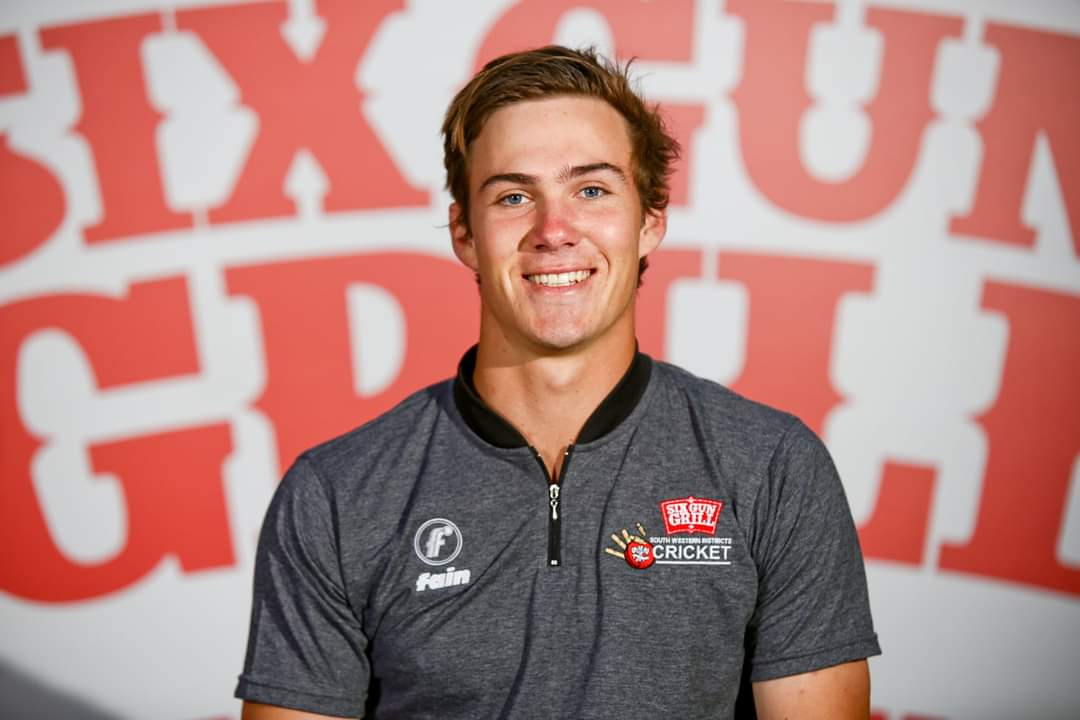

Personal information
- Born: 1 March 2001 (age 25); Knysna, South Africa
- Role: Batsman

Domestic team information
- Years: Team
- 2023-present: MI New York (squad no. 7)
- Source: Cricinfo, 13 September 2019

Heath Richards (born 1 March 2001) is a South African–American cricketer. He made his Twenty20 debut for South Western Districts in the 2019–20 CSA Provincial T20 Cup on 13 September 2019. He made his first-class debut on 3 October 2019, for South Western Districts in the 2019–20 CSA 3-Day Provincial Cup. He made his List A debut on 6 October 2019, for South Western Districts in the 2019–20 CSA Provincial One-Day Challenge.
