= Jonathan October =

South African-born Finnish cricketer (born 1974)

Personal information
- Full name: Jonathan Ricardo October
- Born: 21 September 1974 (age 52); Mossel Bay, Cape Province, South Africa
- Batting: Right-handed
- Bowling: Right-arm medium

International information
- National side: Finland

Domestic team information
- Years: Team
- 2006/07: South Western Districts

Career statistics
Competition	FC	LA
Matches	2	2
Runs scored	66	10
Batting average	16.50	5.00
100s/50s	–/–	–/–
Top score	25	8
Balls bowled	18	66
Wickets	–	2
Bowling average	–	36.00
5 wickets in innings	–	–
10 wickets in match	–	–
Best bowling	–	2/54
Catches/stumpings	–/–	–/–
- Source: CricketArchive, 23 January 2011

Jonathan October (born 21 September 1974) is a South African-born Finnish cricketer. He was a right-handed batsman and a right-arm medium-pace bowler. He was born in Mossel Bay.

October's career began in 2002 when he represented Finland at the ECC Representative Festival competition, against Slovenia. Thanks to October's batting in the 40-over match, putting on 45 runs, they won the match by nine wickets.

October played in the Notts Sport Affiliates Championship competition in 2005, and in 2006 played in the Second Division of the Shepherd Neame Kent Cricket League for Bromley Common. October picked up two first-class appearances and two List A appearances for South Western Districts in the SAA Three-Day Challenge competition of 2006–07.

October played one further season in the Kent Cricket League, boosting Bromley Common's middle-order offense, and making a half-century in his final game in the competition.
