= Caleb Pillay =

South African cricketer (born 2000)

Personal information
- Born: 29 October 2000 (age 26)
- Source: Cricinfo, 26 October 2019

Caleb Pillay (born 29 October 2000) is a South African cricketer. He made his first-class debut on 24 October 2019, for KwaZulu-Natal Inland in the 2019–20 CSA 3-Day Provincial Cup.
