= Bardo Fransman =

South African cricketer (born 1979)

Personal information
- Born: 3 March 1979 (age 47)
- Source: Cricinfo, 1 December 2020

Bardo Fransman (born 3 March 1979) is a South African cricketer. He played in 31 first-class and 38 List A matches for Boland and South Western Districts from 2003 to 2010.
