= Brandon Williams (cricketer) =

South African cricketer (born 1989)

Personal information
- Full name: Brandon Williams
- Born: 20 September 1989 (age 37); East London, South Africa
- Batting: Right-handed
- Bowling: Left-arm orthodox spin

Domestic team information
- Years: Team
- 2009–2010: Boland
- Only First-class: 28 January 2010 Boland v South Western Districts
- Only List A: 17 January 2010 Boland v Northerns

Career statistics
Competition	First-class	List A
Matches	1	1
Runs scored	3	0
Batting average	-	-
100s/50s	0/0	-
Top score	3*	-
Balls bowled	144	12
Wickets	1	0
Bowling average	49.00	-
5 wickets in innings	0	0
10 wickets in match	0	0
Best bowling	1–40	0–12
Catches/stumpings	0/–	0/–
- Source: CricketArchive, 4 April 2012

Brandon Williams (born 20 September 1989) is a South African cricketer who played for Boland during the 2009–10 season. A right-handed batsman and left-arm orthodox spin bowler, he played his maiden first-class match on 28 January 2010 against South Western Districts. He also played for Border.
