= Jacob Miltz =

South African cricketer (born 2000)

Personal information
- Full name: Jacob Miltz
- Born: 14 February 2000 (age 26)
- Source: Cricinfo, 18 January 2020

Jacob Miltz (born 14 February 2000) is a South African cricketer. He made his first-class debut on 16 January 2020, for Gauteng in the 2019–20 CSA 3-Day Provincial Cup. Prior to his first-class debut, he had played for South Africa's U19 cricket team.
