= Matthew Pollard =

South African cricketer (born 2000)

Personal information
- Born: 16 May 2000 (age 26)
- Source: Cricinfo, 3 October 2019

Matthew Pollard (born 16 May 2000) is a South African cricketer. He made his first-class debut on 3 October 2019, for KwaZulu-Natal in the 2019–20 CSA 3-Day Provincial Cup. He made his List A debut on 6 October 2019, for KwaZulu-Natal in the 2019–20 CSA Provincial One-Day Challenge.
