= Adrian McLaren =

South African cricketer (born 1980)

Adrian Peter McLaren (born 21 April 1980 in Kimberley, Northern Cape) is a South African former first class cricketer who played for Griqualand West and SW Districts. A right-handed batsman, McLaren was the second highest runs scorer in the SAA Provincial Challenge for 2006–07 with 807 runs at 62.07, including 4 hundreds. He retired in 2014. His cousin Ryan McLaren also played domestic cricket in South Africa.
