= Alindile Mhletywa =

South African cricketer

Personal information
- Full name: Alindile Mhletywa
- Source: Cricinfo, 17 October 2019

Alindile Mhletywa is a South African cricketer. He made his List A debut on 20 October 2019, for Border in the 2019–20 CSA Provincial One-Day Challenge. He made his first-class debut on 24 October 2019, for Border in the 2019–20 CSA 3-Day Provincial Cup. He made his Twenty20 debut on 12 February 2022, for Warriors in the 2021–22 CSA T20 Challenge.
