= Enathi Kitshini =

South African cricketer

Personal information
- Full name: Enathi Kitshini
- Born: 9 January 2007 (age 19); George, Western Cape, South Africa
- Batting: Right-handed
- Bowling: Slow left arm orthodox
- Role: Bowler

Domestic team information
- Years: Team
- South Western Districts
- Source: ESPNcricinfo, 15 March 2026

Enathi Kitshini (born 2007) is a South African cricketer who has represented South Western Districts in first-class cricket and South Africa Under-19 at youth international level.

== Early life and education ==
Kitshini was born in George and grew up in Thembalethu. He attended Thembalethu High School and came through the Thembalethu Cricket Hub development programme. He began playing cricket as a child and progressed through South Western Districts age group teams before moving into the academy and Colts sides.

== Career ==
Kitshini was selected for SA Colts in 2023. He made his senior first class debut for South Western Districts against Limpopo in December 2024 while still a Grade 11 pupil at Thembalethu High School. After the 2024 Khaya Majola national under 19 tournament, he was selected for the South African Schools team. In January 2025, he was named in South Africa's Under 19 squads for the Youth ODI and Youth Test series against England. In December 2025, he became the first player from South Western Districts to captain the South African Schools team, after taking 12 wickets at an average of 23.5 in the national schools tournament. He was then selected in South Africa's squad for the 2026 Under-19 Men's Cricket World Cup.
