= Tyrese Karelse =

South African cricketer (born 2001)

Personal information
- Born: 5 November 2001 (age 25)
- Source: Cricinfo, 3 October 2019

Tyrese Karelse (born 5 November 2001) is a South African cricketer. He made his first-class debut on 3 October 2019, for South Western Districts in the 2019–20 CSA 3-Day Provincial Cup. He made his List A debut on 6 October 2019, for South Western Districts in the 2019–20 CSA Provincial One-Day Challenge. In December 2019, he was named in South Africa's squad for the 2020 Under-19 Cricket World Cup.
