= Jean du Plessis =

South African cricketer (born 1998)

Personal information
- Born: 24 November 1998 (age 27)
- Source: ESPNcricinfo, 16 September 2016

Jean du Plessis (born 24 November 1998) is a South African cricketer. He was included in the South Western Districts squad for the 2016 Africa T20 Cup. He made his Twenty20 (T20) debut for South Western Districts against Northern Cape on 16 September 2016. He made his List A debut for South Western Districts in the 2016–17 CSA Provincial One-Day Challenge on 16 October 2016. He made his first-class debut for South Western Districts on 1 December 2016 in the 2016–17 Sunfoil 3-Day Cup.

In December 2017, he was named in South Africa's squad for the 2018 Under-19 Cricket World Cup. In August 2018, he was awarded a senior contract by Cricket South Africa ahead of the 2018–19 domestic season. In April 2021, he was named in South Western Districts' squad, ahead of the 2021–22 cricket season in South Africa.
