= Mathew Christensen =

South African cricketer (born 1996)

Personal information
- Full name: Mathew Colin Christensen
- Born: 17 July 1996 (age 30); Cape Town, South Africa
- Batting: Right-handed
- Bowling: Right-arm off spin
- Role: All-rounder

Domestic team information
- Years: Team
- 2015–2018: Eastern Province Cricket Club
- Source: ESPNcricinfo, 2 September 2016

Mathew Christensen (born 17 July 1996) is a South African cricketer. He made his Twenty20 cricket debut for Eastern Province on 18 September 2015 in the 2015 Africa T20 Cup. In September 2018, he was named in Eastern Province's squad for the 2018 Africa T20 Cup. In September 2019, he was named in Eastern Province's squad for the 2019–20 CSA Provincial T20 Cup. He was the leading run-scorer in the 2019–20 CSA 3-Day Provincial Cup, with 776 runs in ten matches.
