= Nonelela Yikha =

South African cricketer (born 2001)

Personal information
- Born: 13 August 2001 (age 25)
- Source: Cricinfo, 18 January 2020

Nonelela Yikha (born 13 August 2001) is a South African cricketer. He made his first-class debut on 16 January 2020, for Border in the 2019–20 CSA 3-Day Provincial Cup. He made his List A debut on 19 January 2020, for Border in the 2019–20 CSA Provincial One-Day Challenge. In April 2021, he was named in Border's squad, ahead of the 2021–22 cricket season in South Africa.
