= Siya Simetu =

South African cricketer (born 1991)

Personal information
- Born: 22 August 1991 (age 35); Cape Town, Cape Province, South Africa
- Source: Cricinfo, 6 September 2015

Siya Simetu (born 22 August 1991) is a South African first-class cricketer. He was included in the South Western Districts cricket team squad for the 2015 Africa T20 Cup.
