= Mathew Fourie =

South African cricketer (born 2002)

Personal information
- Born: 16 October 2002 (age 24)
- Source: Cricinfo, 1 February 2020

Mathew Fourie (born 16 October 2002) is a South African cricketer. He made his first-class debut on 30 January 2020, for Border in the 2019–20 CSA 3-Day Provincial Cup. He made his List A debut on 7 March 2020, for Border in the 2019–20 CSA Provincial One-Day Challenge.
