= Kobus Scholtz =

South African cricketer (born 1992)

Personal information
- Full name: Willem Jacobus Scholtz
- Born: 16 October 1992 (age 34)
- Source: Cricinfo, 8 November 2019

Kobus Scholtz (born 16 October 1992) is a South African cricketer. He made his first-class debut on 8 December 2011, for South Western Districts in the 2011–12 CSA Provincial Three-Day Challenge. He made his List A debut on 29 January 2012, for South Western Districts in the 2011–12 CSA Provincial One-Day Challenge.
