= Sinethemba Mjekula =

South African cricketer (born 1983)

Personal information
- Born: 16 October 1983 (age 43)
- Source: Cricinfo, 13 December 2018

Sinethemba Mjekula (born 16 October 1983) is a South African former cricketer. He played in 49 first-class and 31 List A cricket matches in domestic tournaments in South Africa between 2004 and 2013. He is now an umpire and has stood in matches in the 2018–19 CSA 3-Day Provincial Cup and the 2018–19 CSA Provincial One-Day Challenge.
