= Tsepo Ndwandwa =

South African cricketer (born 1995)

Personal information
- Full name: Sesona Tsepo Ndwandwa
- Born: 16 April 1995 (age 31); Port Elizabeth, South Africa
- Batting: Right-handed
- Bowling: Slow left-arm orthodox
- Role: Bowler

Domestic team information
- Years: Team
- 2015/16–2017/18: Border
- 2017/18–2020/21: South Western Districts
- 2018/19–2019/20: Cape Cobras
- 2021/22–2022/23: Eastern Province
- 2023/24: Gauteng
- 2024/25: Northerns
- Source: ESPNcricinfo, 9 September 2016

Tsepo Ndwandwa (born 16 April 1995) is a South African cricketer. He made his Twenty20 debut for Border against KwaZulu-Natal Inland on 6 March 2016. He made his first-class debut for Border in the 2015–16 Sunfoil 3-Day Cup on 18 February 2016. He made his List A debut for Border in the 2016–17 CSA Provincial One-Day Challenge on 30 October 2016. In April 2021, he was named in Eastern Province's squad, ahead of the 2021–22 cricket season in South Africa.
