= Chad Classen =

South African cricketer (born 1997)

Personal information
- Born: 17 January 1997 (age 29)
- Source: ESPNcricinfo, 23 February 2017

Chad Classen (born 17 January 1997) is a South African cricketer. He made his first-class debut for Gauteng in the 2016–17 Sunfoil 3-Day Cup on 23 February 2017. He made his List A debut for Gauteng in the 2016–17 CSA Provincial One-Day Challenge on 19 March 2017.

In September 2018, he was named in Gauteng's squad for the 2018 Africa T20 Cup. He made his Twenty20 debut for Gauteng in the 2018 Africa T20 Cup on 16 September 2018. In April 2021, he was named in North West's squad, ahead of the 2021–22 cricket season in South Africa.
