= Ernest Kemm =

South African cricketer (born 1990)

Personal information
- Full name: Ernest Hercules Kemm
- Born: 18 November 1990 (age 35); Potchefstroom, South Africa
- Source: Cricinfo, 1 September 2015

Ernest Hercules Kemm (born 18 November 1990) is a South African cricketer. He is an all-rounder: a left-handed batter and slow left-arm orthodox spin bowler.

Kemm was included in the Easterns cricket team squad for the 2015 Africa T20 Cup. In September 2018, he was named in Limpopo's squad for the 2018 Africa T20 Cup. In April 2021, he was named in Northern Cape's squad, ahead of the 2021–22 cricket season in South Africa.
