= Sizwe Masondo =

South African cricketer (born 1987)

Personal information
- Born: 13 February 1987 (age 39); Johannesburg, South Africa

Domestic team information
- Years: Team
- Gauteng Strikers
- Highveld Lions
- Source: Cricinfo, 6 September 2015

Sizwe Masondo (born 13 February 1987) is a South African cricketer. He was included in the Gauteng cricket team squad for the 2015 Africa T20 Cup. In September 2018, he was named in Easterns' squad for the 2018 Africa T20 Cup. In September 2019, he was named in Easterns' squad for the 2019–20 CSA Provincial T20 Cup. In April 2021, he was named in Easterns' squad, ahead of the 2021–22 cricket season in South Africa.
