= Bradley Porteous =

South African cricketer (born 1998)

Personal information
- Born: 28 July 1998 (age 28)
- Source: Cricinfo, 11 October 2018

Bradley Porteous (born 28 July 1998) is a South African cricketer. He made his first-class debut for KwaZulu-Natal in the 2018–19 CSA 3-Day Provincial Cup on 11 October 2018. He made his List A debut for KwaZulu-Natal in the 2018–19 CSA Provincial One-Day Challenge on 21 October 2018.
