= Siviwe Gidana =

South African cricketer (born 1987)

Personal information
- Born: 7 August 1987 (age 39)
- Source: Cricinfo, 13 April 2019

Siviwe Gidana (born 7 August 1987) is a South African cricketer. He made his first-class debut for Eastern Province in the 2008–09 Provincial Three-Day Challenge on 5 February 2009. He made his List A debut for Eastern Province in the 2008–09 Provincial One-Day Challenge on 8 February 2009.
