= Bryce Parsons =

South African cricketer (born 2001)

Personal information
- Born: 13 February 2001 (age 25); Benoni, South Africa
- Batting: Left-handed
- Bowling: Slow left-arm orthodox
- Role: Batting All-rounder

Domestic team information
- Years: Team
- 2019/20–2020/21: Gauteng
- 2020/21: Lions
- 2021/22–present: Dolphins
- 2025: Durban's Super Giants
- 2026: Pretoria Capitals

Career statistics
Competition	FC	LA	T20
Matches	30	26	53
Runs scored	1,627	618	899
Batting average	38.73	29.42	20.90
100s/50s	4/6	1/3	1/2
Top score	191	105	102*
Balls bowled	2,898	518	423
Wickets	45	6	21
Bowling average	35.20	76.16	22.42
5 wickets in innings	3	0	0
10 wickets in match	0	0	0
Best bowling	6/41	2/33	3/10
Catches/stumpings	22/–	12/–	20/–
- Source: Cricinfo, 23 April 2026

Bryce Parsons (born 13 February 2001) is a South African cricketer. He made his Twenty20 debut for Gauteng in the 2019–20 CSA Provincial T20 Cup on 14 September 2019. In December 2019, he was named as the captain of South Africa's squad for the 2020 Under-19 Cricket World Cup. He was the leading run-scorer for South Africa in the tournament, with 265 runs in six matches.

He made his first-class debut on 13 February 2020, for Gauteng in the 2019–20 CSA 3-Day Provincial Cup. He made his List A debut on 16 February 2020, for Gauteng in the 2019–20 CSA Provincial One-Day Challenge.

In April 2021, Parsons was named in the South Africa Emerging Men's squad for their six-match tour of Namibia. Later the same month, he was named in KwaZulu-Natal's squad, ahead of the 2021–22 cricket season in South Africa.
