= Gavin Kaplan =

South African cricketer (born 1998)

Personal information
- Born: 7 February 1998 (age 28)

Domestic team information
- Years: Team
- 2021/22: Western Province
- Source: Cricinfo, 18 November 2021

Gavin Kaplan (born 7 February 1998) is a South African cricketer. He made his first-class debut on 18 November 2021, for Western Province in the 2021–22 CSA 4-Day Series. He made his Twenty20 debut on 7 February 2022, for Western Province in the 2021–22 CSA T20 Challenge. He made his List A debut on 16 March 2022, for Western Province in the 2021–22 CSA One-Day Cup.
