= Kurtlyn Mannikam =

South African cricketer (born 1996)

Personal information
- Full name: Kurtlyn Reece Mannikam
- Born: 19 January 1996 (age 30); Ladysmith, KZN, South Africa
- Source: ESPNcricinfo, 1 September 2016

Kurtlyn Mannikam (born 19 January 1996) is a South African cricketer. He was included in the KZN Inland squad for the 2016 Africa T20 Cup. In April 2021, he was named in KwaZulu-Natal Inland's squad, ahead of the 2021–22 cricket season in South Africa.
