= Nealan van Heerden =

South African cricketer (born 1997)

Personal information
- Born: 27 January 1997 (age 29)
- Batting: Left-handed
- Bowling: Right-arm fast
- Role: Bowler

Domestic team information
- Years: Team
- 2017: Free State
- Source: ESPNcricinfo, 16 February 2017

Nealan van Heerden (born 27 January 1997) is a South African first-class cricketer. He made his first-class debut for Free State on 16 February 2017. He made his Twenty20 debut for Free State in the 2017 Africa T20 Cup on 8 September 2017. In April 2021, he was named in Free State's squad, ahead of the 2021–22 cricket season in South Africa.
