= Yaseen Valli =

South African cricketer (born 1995)

Personal information
- Born: 3 June 1995 (age 31); Norwood, Johannesburg, South Africa
- Batting: Left-handed
- Role: Batter

Career statistics
Competition	FC	List A	T20
Matches	80	48	24
Runs scored	4165	1540	574
Batting average	34.13	33.47	27.33
100s/50s	9/18	2/10	0/4
Top score	230	130	62*
Catches/stumpings	61/0	17/0	6/1
- Source: ESPNcricinfo, 16 October 2026

Yaseen Valli (born 3 June 1995) is a South African cricketer. He was part of South Africa's squad for the 2014 ICC Under-19 Cricket World Cup. He was included in the Gauteng cricket team for the 2015 Africa T20 Cup.

In June 2018, he was named in the squad for the Highveld Lions team for the 2018–19 season. In September 2019, he was named in Easterns' squad for the 2019–20 CSA Provincial T20 Cup. In January 2020, in the 2019–20 CSA 3-Day Provincial Cup match against Boland, Valli and Andrea Agathangelou made an opening partnership of 485 runs, breaking the previous record in a first-class match in South Africa of 424 runs set in the 1926–27 season. In April 2021, he was named in South Western Districts' squad, ahead of the 2021–22 cricket season in South Africa.
