= Abongile Sodumo =

South African cricketer (born 1982)

Personal information
- Born: 16 June 1982 (age 44); King Williams Town, Cape Province, South Africa
- Batting: Right-handed
- Role: Wicket keeper batsman

Umpiring information
- WODIs umpired: 1 (2023)
- WT20Is umpired: 1 (2023)
- Source: Cricinfo, 3 February 2023

Abongile Mzimkhulu Sodumo is a South African former first class cricketer. He is a right handed wicket keeper batsman. He is now an umpire.
