= North West cricket team =

Cricket team

North West (formerly Western Transvaal) plays first-class cricket in South Africa.

North West Dragons was called Western Transvaal in 1989–90 when it began playing List A cricket in the Nissan Shield, and in 1991–92 when it began playing in the second tier of the South African first-class cricket competition. It changed its name to North West in 1996, after the creation of North West province from parts of the former Transvaal Province and Cape Province.

Under the name Western Transvaal it won no matches at all in its five first-class seasons. In its first season as North West it had its first first-class victory when it beat Western Province B by 27 runs in January 1997.

In October 2004, CSA merged various unions to create six major franchises for domestic competition.

During the franchise era (2004/05 to 2020/21), North West has merged with Gauteng (formerly Transvaal) to form the Highveld Lions or, more simply, "the Lions" for First Class cricket and Men's Limited Overs competitions.

The union continued to exist for purposes of women's, youth and development teams and minor competitions. In April 2017 the province's administration, North West Cricket, re-branded all the province's teams as the "North-West Dragons".

During the 2018 Africa T20 Cup, North West scored 262 runs against Limpopo, recording the second-highest total in T20 cricket at the time.

After CSA disbanded the franchise system and returned to a provincial cricket structure in 2020, the team competed as the North West Dragons in Division 1 of the two-division system in four day, one day and T20 cricket.

== Current squad ==
Squad for 2026/27 Season. Players in bold have played international cricket.

Name	Nationality	Birth date	Batting style	Bowling style	Notes
Batters
Paul James	South Africa	18 January 2007 (age 19)	Right-handed	Right-arm seam	High-Performance Contract
Lesiba Ngoepe	South Africa	14 April 1993 (age 33)	Left-handed	Left-arm orthodox spin	
Diego Rosier	South Africa	5 February 1994 (age 32)	Right-handed	Right-arm wrist spin	
Ludwich Schuld	South Africa	18 July 2005 (age 21)	Left-handed		
**Raynard van Tonder**	South Africa	26 September 1998 (age 27)	Right-handed	Right-arm wrist spin	
Wicket-keepers
**Rubin Hermann**	South Africa	27 January 1997 (age 29)	Left-handed		Player of National Interest
Meeka-eel Prince	South Africa	5 April 2004 (age 22)	Right-handed		
All-rounders
Jade de Klerk	South Africa	24 February 1999 (age 27)	Right-handed	Left-arm orthodox spin	
**Ruan de Swardt**	South Africa	21 January 1998 (age 28)	Left-handed	Right-arm seam	
**Dian Forrester**	South Africa	7 June 2000 (age 26)	Left-handed	Right-arm seam	Player of National Interest
Juan James	South Africa	7 October 2004 (age 21)	Right-handed	Right-arm orthodox spin	
**Wihan Lubbe**	South Africa	7 October 2004 (age 21)	Left-handed	Right-arm orthodox spin	
Onke Nyaku	South Africa	26 September 1994 (age 31)	Right-handed	Right-arm seam	
Bowlers
**Daryn Dupavillon**	South Africa	15 July 1994 (age 32)	Right-handed	Right-arm seam	
Callie Fryer	South Africa	15 April 2008 (age 18)	Right-handed	Right-arm seam	High-performance Contract
Alfred Mothoa	South Africa	16 December 1989 (age 36)	Right-handed	Right-arm seam	
Mthiwekhaya Nabe	South Africa	31 October 1995 (age 30)	Right-handed	Right-arm seam	
Caleb Seleka	South Africa	22 November 2002 (age 23)	Right-handed	Right-arm wrist spin	
Lutendo Tsanwani	South Africa	26 July 2004 (age 22)	Right-handed	Right-arm seam	High-performance Contract
Nealan van Heerden	South Africa	31 October 1995 (age 30)	Left-handed	Right-arm seam	High-performance Contract

== Venues ==
Venues have included:

- Witrand Cricket Field, Potchefstroom (Nov 1991 – Dec 1996)
- Fanie du Toit Sports Complex, Potchefstroom (Nov 1994 – March 1998)
- Gert Van Rensburg Stadium, Fochville (Dec 1997 – Feb 1999)
- North West Cricket Stadium aka Sedgars Park, Potchefstroom (main venue Oct 1999–present)

== Sources ==
- South African Cricket Annual – various editions
- Wisden Cricketers' Almanack – various editions
