= South Western Districts cricket team =

South African cricket team

South Western Districts, currently playing as the Garden Route Badgers, and also known as SW Districts or SWD, is a South African first class cricket team based in the Western Cape city of Oudtshoorn, representing approximately the eastern half of Western Cape province. They formed part of the former Cape Cobras franchise until 2021, and play their home games at the Oudtshoorn Recreation Ground.

== Playing history ==
South Western Districts played their inaugural first-class match in the Currie Cup in 1904 at Mossel Bay against Western Province but did not play another first-class match for 102 years.

The South Western Districts Cricket Board was granted associate status by Cricket South Africa in 2004 and the team has taken part in the Provincial Three-Day Challenge and Provincial One-Day Challenge competitions since the 2006–07 season. It was upgraded to full affiliate status in 2013 and as of early December 2020 South Western Districts had played 143 first-class matches for 37 wins, 53 losses and 53 draws and 111 List A matches for 52 wins, 57 losses, one tie and one no-result.

== Current squad ==
Squad for 2026/27 Season. Players in bold have played international cricket.

Name	Nationality	Birth date	Batting style	Bowling style	Notes
Batters
**Janneman Malan**	South Africa	18 April 1996 (age 30)	Right-handed	Right arm wrist spin	
Yaseen Valli	South Africa	3 June 1995 (age 31)	Left-handed	Left arm orthodox spin	
Wicket-keepers
Nathan Engelbrecht	South Africa	30 May 2001 (age 25)	Left-handed	Right arm orthodox spin	
Bennie Hansen	South Africa	27 June 2006 (age 20)	Right-handed		
Slade van Staden	South Africa	30 April 2003 (age 23)	Right-handed	Right arm wrist spin	
All-rounders
Leo Sadler	South Africa	13 April 2004 (age 22)	Right-handed	Right arm seam	
Pheko Moletsane	South Africa	9 July 2001 (age 25)	Right-handed	Right arm orthodox spin	
Bowlers
Liam Alder	South Africa	7 October 2003 (age 22)	Right-handed	Left arm orthodox spin	
Banele Cele	South Africa	2 February 2003 (age 23)	Right-handed	Right arm seam	
Enathi Kitshini	South Africa	9 January 2007 (age 19)	Right-handed	Left arm orthodox spin	High-performance contract
Zack Momberg	South Africa	16 April 2003 (age 23)	Right-handed	Right arm seam	
Modise Maloka	South Africa	7 May 2005 (age 21)	Right-handed	Right arm seam	
Nipho Mpungose	South Africa	28 July 1999 (age 27)	Right-handed	Right arm seam	High-performance contract
Jade Richter	South Africa	17 September 1996 (age 29)	Right-handed	Right arm seam	High-performance Contract

== External sources ==
- SWD Cricket website
- South Western Districts at Cricket Archive

== Sources ==
- South African Cricket Annual – various editions
- Wisden Cricketers' Almanack – various editions
