= 2024–25 CSA One-Day Cup =

Cricket tournament

- Dates: 15 February – 16 March 2025
- Administrator: Cricket South Africa
- Cricket format: List A
- Tournament format: Round-robin
- Champions: Dolphins (Division 1)
- Participants: 16
- Matches: 59
- Most runs: JJ Smuts (473)
- Most wickets: Kyle Simmonds (16); Imran Manack (16)

The 2024–25 CSA One-Day Cup was the 45th season of CSA One-Day Cup, the List A cricket tournament that was played in South Africa. The tournament was held from 15 February to 16 March 2025. In July 2024, Cricket South Africa confirmed the fixtures for the tournament, as a part of the 2024–25 domestic cricket season. Western Province (Division 1) and SA Emerging (Division 2) were the defending champions.

On 10 March 2025, CSA announced that Warriors, the provincial team based in Gqeberha, had lost their playoff-spot after being docked 5 points for not complying with the on-field target requirement of a minimum of three Black African players in their playing XI as per the transformation target. CSA also sanctioned a monetary fined on Warriors. Of which 50% would be payable before the end of the ongoing financial year and the remaining 50% would be suspended for five years and will only be activated if a similar breach occurs within that period. Dolphins were awarded 4 points for the match. Warriors and Dolphins were placed 2nd and 4th initially but swapped their positions due to the penalty.

== Teams ==
The teams were placed into the following divisions:

- Division 1:

Warriors, Western Province, Titans, Lions, Knights, Boland, North West, Dolphins

- Division 2:

South Western Districts, KwaZulu-Natal (Inland), Border, Easterns, Northern Cape, Limpopo, Mpumalanga, South Africa Emerging Players

== Standings ==
=== Division 1 ===
Pos	Team	Pld	W	L	NR	BP	Ded	Pts	NRR	Qualification
1	Boland	7	5	1	1	3	0	25	0.565	Advanced to the Final
2	Dolphins (Note: Dolphins initially had 1 Bonus Point but were awarded 4 more points following sanction on Warriors by CSA.)	7	4	2	1	5	0	23	0.305	Advanced to the Qualifier
3	Titans	7	4	2	1	3	0	21	1.012	Advanced to the Qualifier
4	Warriors (Note: Warriors had 3 Bonus Points initially but were penalised 5 points following sanction by CSA as they failed to field the minimum of three Black African players in the starting eleven.)	7	4	2	1	3	5	16	0.692	
5	Knights	7	3	3	1	2	0	16	0.578	
6	Lions	7	2	4	1	0	0	10	−0.595	
7	North West	7	2	5	0	1	0	9	−1.295	
8	Western Province	7	1	6	0	1	0	5	−1.068	

Source: ESPNcricinfo

=== Division 2 ===
Pos	Team	Pld	W	L	NR	Pts	NRR	Qualification
1	KwaZulu-Natal (Inland)	7	5	0	2	27	1.103	Advanced to the Final
2	Border	7	4	1	2	22	0.416	Advanced to the Final
3	Mpumalanga	7	5	2	0	21	0.349	
4	Northern Cape	7	4	2	1	21	0.506	
5	South Western Districts	7	3	4	0	14	−0.251	
6	Easterns	7	2	4	1	12	0.130	
7	South Africa Emerging Players	7	1	5	1	6	−0.818	
8	Limpopo	7	0	6	1	2	−1.238	

Source: ESPNcricinfo

== Division 1 fixtures ==
15 February 2025
13:00 (D/N)
Scorecard

Lions; 259/7 (50 overs)	v	Western Province; 219 (46.5 overs)
Zubayr Hamza 56 (79); Kyle Simmonds 3/40 (10 overs)		Edward Moore 66 (94); Lutho Sipamla 4/43 (9 overs)

Lions won by 40 runs
Newlands Cricket Ground, Cape Town
Umpires: Thomas Mokorosi and Abdoellah Steenkamp
Player of the match: Lutho Sipamla (Lions)

- Lions won the toss and elected to bat.
- Wesley Bedja (Western Province) made his List A debut.
- Points: Lions 4, Western Province 0

15 February 2025
13:00 (D/N)
Scorecard

Knights; 257 (47.5 overs)	v	North West; 259/6 (46.5 overs)
Gerrie Snyman 85 (77); Ruan de Swardt 3/44 (7.5 overs)		Janneman Malan 90 (118); Johannes van Dyk 2/53(6 overs)

North West won by 4 wickets
Absa Puk Oval, Potchefstroom
Umpires: Siphelele Gasa and Bongani Jele
Player of the match: Janneman Malan (North West)

- North West won the toss and elected to field.
- The match was reduced to 48 overs per side due to rain.
- Tahir Isaacs (North West) made his List A debut.
- Points: North West 4, Knights 0

16 February 2025
10:00
Scorecard

Titans; 110 (41.4 overs)	v	Boland; 111/5 (36 overs)
Dayyaan Galiem 45 (72); Imran Manack 3/12 (7.4 overs)		Gavin Kaplan 42* (78); Tsepo Ndwandwa 3/21 (7 overs)

Boland won by 5 wickets
Boland Park, Paarl
Umpires: Thomas Mokorosi and Andre Olivier
Player of the match: Imran Manack (Boland)

- Boland won the toss and elected to field.
- Lesego Kokohlabana (Titans) made his List A debut.
- Points: Boland 5, Titans 0

16 February 2025
10:00
Scorecard

Warriors; 343/2 (50 overs)	v	Dolphins; 217 (40.2 overs)
Jordan Hermann 148* (145); Andile Simelane 1/52 (10 overs)		JJ Smuts 58 (46); Andile Mokgakane 4/23 (5.5 overs)

Warriors won by 126 runs
Kingsmead Cricket Ground, Durban
Umpires: Lubabalo Gcuma and Brad White
Player of the match: Jordan Hermann (Warriors)

- Warriors won the toss and elected to bat.
- Christopher King (Warriors) made his List A debut.
- Points: Warriors 0, Dolphins 4

19 February 2025
13:00 (D/N)
Scorecard

Dolphins; 174 (49.4 overs)	v	Boland; 175/4 (39 overs)
Bryce Parsons 50 (85); Imran Manack 4/24 (9.4 overs)		Grant Roelofsen 52 (62); Eathan Bosch 1/27 (4 overs)

Boland won by 6 wickets
Boland Park, Paarl
Umpires: Brad White and Warren Wyngaard
Player of the match: Imran Manack (Boland)

- Dolphins won the toss and elected to bat.
- Points: Boland 5, Dolphins 0

19 February 2025
13:00 (D/N)
Scorecard

North West; 145 (38.2 overs)	v	Western Province; 146/3 (23 overs)
Raynard van Tonder 55 (79); Kyle Simmonds 4/21 (10 overs)		Kyle Verreynne 47* (44); Kerwin Mungroo 2/22 (6 overs)

Western Province won by 7 wickets
Newlands Cricket Ground, Cape Town
Umpires: Arno Jacobs and Phillip Vosloo
Player of the match: Kyle Simmonds (Western Province)

- North West won the toss and elected to bat.
- Lutendo Tsanwani (North West) made his List A debut.
- Points: Western Province 5, North West 0

19 February 2025
13:00 (D/N)
Scorecard

Knights; 247/7 (50 overs)	v	Warriors; 7/1 (5 overs)
Dian Forrester 123* (105); Siya Plaatjie 2/52 (9 overs)		Diego Rosier 5* (16); Gerrie Snyman 1/1 (1 over)

No result
Mangaung Oval, Bloemfontein
Umpires: Stephen Harris and Dennis Smith

- Warriors won the toss and elected to field.
- Points: Knights 2, Warriors 2

21 February 2025
13:00 (D/N)
Scorecard

Lions; 300/9 (49 overs)	v	Titans; 295 (47.5 overs)
Reeza Hendricks 94 (93); Dayyaan Galiem 4/73 (10 overs)		Dewald Brevis 102 (72); Codi Yusuf 4/53 (9.5 overs)

Lions won by 4 runs (DLS method)
Centurion Park, Centurion
Umpires: Allahudien Paleker and Phillip Vosloo
Player of the match: Reeza Hendricks (Lions)

- Titans won the toss and elected to field.
- The match was reduced to 49 overs per side due to rain.
- Titans were set a revised target of 300 runs from 49 overs.
- Points: Lions 4, Titans 0

22 February 2025
13:00 (D/N)
Scorecard

Warriors; 198 (43.4 overs)	v	Boland; 201/7 (48.1 overs)
Patrick Kruger 39 (38); Ayabulela Gqamane 3/24 (8 overs)		Shaun von Berg 49* (74); Alfred Mothoa 3/34 (10 overs)

Boland won by 3 wickets
St George's Park, Gqeberha
Umpires: Arno Jacobs and Abongile Sodumo
Player of the match: Imran Manack (Boland)

- Boland won the toss and elected to field.
- Points: Boland 4, Warriors 0

22 February 2025
13:00 (D/N)
Scorecard

Knights; 311/6 (50 overs)	v	Western Province; 154 (34.4 overs)
Dian Forrester 113 (99); Kyle Simmonds 3/53 (10 overs)		George Linde 37 (40); Tiaan van Vuuren 3/16 (5.4 overs)

Knights won by 157 runs
Mangaung Oval, Bloemfontein
Umpires: Mazizi Gampu and Stephen Harris
Player of the match: Dian Forrester (Knights)

- Knights won the toss and elected to bat.
- Points: Knights 5, Western Province 0

23 February 2025
10:00
Scorecard

North West; 310/6 (49.2 overs)	v	Lions; 249 (45.2 overs)
Wihan Lubbe 80 (64); Nqaba Peter 3/73 (10 overs)		Connor Esterhuizen 59 (54); Ruan de Swardt 3/34 (8.2 overs)

North West won by 65 runs (DLS method)
Wanderers Stadium, Johannesburg
Umpires: Allahudien Paleker and Brad White
Player of the match: Wihan Lubbe (North West)

- North West won the toss and elected to bat.
- The second innings was reduced to 49 overs due to rain.
- Lions were set a revised target of 315 runs from 49 overs.
- Muhammad Manack (Lions) made his List A debut.
- Points: North West 5, Lions 0

23 February 2025
10:00
Scorecard

Dolphins; 305 (48.2 overs)	v	Titans; 15/0 (2.3 overs)
JJ Smuts 71 (61); Matthew Boast 3/33 (10 overs)		Rivaldo Moonsamy 11* (11)

No result
Centurion Park, Centurion
Umpires: Bongani Jele and Abdoellah Steenkamp

- Dolphins won the toss and elected to bat.
- No further play was possible due to rain.
- Points: Dolphins 2, Titans 2

26 February 2025
13:00 (D/N)
Scorecard

Titans; 337/7 (50 overs)	v	Western Province; 296 (48.1 overs)
Lhuan-dre Pretorius 120 (96); Jody Lawrence 3/44 (10 overs)		Valentine Kitime 87 (94); Matthew Boast 5/38 (5.1 overs)

Titans won by 41 runs
Newlands Cricket Ground, Cape Town
Umpires: Thomas Mokorosi and Andre Olivier
Player of the match: Lhuan-dre Pretorius (Titans)

- Titans won the toss and elected to bat.
- Jody Lawrence (Western Province) made his List A debut.
- Lhuan-dre Pretorius (Titans) scored his first century in List A cricket.
- Matthew Boast (Titans) took his first five-wicket haul in List A cricket.
- Points: Titans 4, Western Province 0

26 February 2025
13:00 (D/N)
Scorecard

Lions; 183/9 (43 overs)	v	Dolphins; 187/4 (39.5 overs)
Delano Potgieter 56* (54); Prenelan Subrayen 4/46 (8 overs)		Bryce Parsons 81* (94); Bjorn Fortuin 2/16 (9 overs)

Dolphins won by 6 wickets
Kingsmead Cricket Ground, Durban
Umpires: Lubabalo Gcuma and Dennis Smith
Player of the match: Bryce Parsons (Dolphins)

- Dolphins won the toss and elected to field.
- The match was reduced to 43 overs per side due to rain.
- Zack Momberg (Lions) made his List A debut.
- Points: Dolphins 4, Lions 0

26 February 2025
13:00 (D/N)
Scorecard

Knights; 249 (49.1 overs)	v	Boland; 228/9 (50 overs)
Dominic Hendricks 55 (76); Akhona Mnyaka 2/35 (7 overs)		Michael Copeland 45 (65); Tiaan van Vuuren 4/39 (10 overs)

Knights won by 21 runs
Mangaung Oval, Bloemfontein
Umpires: Stephen Harris and Brad White
Player of the match: Tiaan van Vuuren (Knights)

- Knights won the toss and elected to bat.
- Points: Knights 4, Boland 0

26 February 2025
13:00 (D/N)
Scorecard

Warriors; 278/8 (50 overs)	v	North West; 157 (40.2 overs)
Senuran Muthusamy 93 (82); Kerwin Mungroo 3/33 (10 overs)		Matthew Kleinveldt 29 (51); Jason Raubenheimer 3/34 (7 overs)

Warriors won by 121 runs
Absa Puk Oval, Potchefstroom
Umpires: Mazizi Gampu and Siphelele Gasa
Player of the match: Senuran Muthusamy (Warriors)

- North West won the toss and elected to field.
- Points: Warriors 5, North West 0

1 March 2025
13:00 (D/N)
Scorecard

North West; 179 (43.5 overs)	v	Boland; 180/8 (39.4 overs)
Wihan Lubbe 54 (80); Glenton Stuurman 6/18 (8.5 overs)		Lehan Botha 66 (67); Caleb Seleka 4/34 (8.4 overs)

Boland won by 2 wickets
Boland Park, Paarl
Umpires: Lauren Agenbag and Thomas Mokorosi
Player of the match: Glenton Stuurman (Boland)

- Boland won the toss and elected to field.
- Nathan Jacobs (Boland) made his List A debut.
- Glenton Stuurman (Boland) took his first five-wicket haul in List A cricket.
- Points: Boland 5, North West 0

1 March 2025
13:00 (D/N)
Scorecard

Knights; 292/7 (39 overs)	v	Lions; 220/8 (39 overs)
Jacques Snyman 160 (118); Evan Jones 5/56 (8 overs)		Reeza Hendricks 54 (52); Matthew Pollard 3/56 (8 overs)

Knights won by 74 runs (DLS method)
Wanderers Stadium, Johannesburg
Umpires: Allahudien Paleker and Abongile Sodumo
Player of the match: Jacques Snyman (Knights)

- Lions won the toss and elected to field.
- The match was reduced to 39 overs per side due to rain.
- Lions were set a revised target of 295 runs from 39 overs.
- Evan Jones (Lions) took his first five-wicket haul in List A cricket.
- Points: Knights 5, Lions 0

1 March 2025
13:00 (D/N)
Scorecard

Dolphins; 317/6 (50 overs)	v	Western Province; 123 (26.5 overs)
Hanu Viljoen 74 (63); Kyle Simmonds 2/31 (10 overs)		David Bedingham 45 (39); Prenelan Subrayen 3/27 (6 overs)

Dolphins won by 194 runs
Newlands Cricket Ground, Cape Town
Umpires: Lubabalo Gcuma and Arno Jacobs
Player of the match: Hanu Viljoen (Dolphins)

- Dolphins won the toss and elected to bat.
- Points: Dolphins 5, Western Province 0

2 March 2025
10:00
Scorecard

Titans; 440/5 (43 overs)	v	Warriors; 251/7 (32 overs)
Rivaldo Moonsamy 126 (83); Senuran Muthusamy 2/80 (9 overs)		Matthew Breetzke 94 (72); Roelof van der Merwe 2/38 (7 overs)

Titans won by 111 runs (DLS method)
Centurion Park, Centurion
Umpires: Bongani Jele and Dennis Smith
Player of the match: Rivaldo Moonsamy (Titans)

- Warriors won the toss and elected to field.
- The match was reduced to 43 overs per side due to rain.
- The second innings was reduced to 32 overs due to rain and Warriors were set a revised target of 363 runs.
- Points: Titans 5, Warriors 0

5 March 2025
13:00 (D/N)
Scorecard

Warriors; 223/9 (50 overs)	v	Western Province; 204 (47.4 overs)
Jordan Hermann 57 (78); Onke Nyaku 4/34 (9.2 overs)		Edward Moore 88* (123); Beyers Swanepoel 4/9 (9 overs)

Warriors won by 19 runs
St George's Park, Gqeberha
Umpires: Arno Jacobs and Abongile Sodumo
Player of the match: Beyers Swanepoel (Warriors)

- Warriors won the toss and elected to bat.
- Points: Warriors 4, Western Province 0

5 March 2025
13:00 (D/N)
Scorecard

Lions; 126/5 (31.5 overs)	v	Boland
Wandile Makwetu 47 (63); Akhona Mnyaka 2/16 (5 overs)

No result
Wanderers Stadium, Johannesburg
Umpires: Andre Olivier and Abdoellah Steenkamp

- Boland won the toss and elected to field.
- No further play was possible due to rain.
- Points: Lions 2, Boland 2

5 March 2025
13:00 (D/N)
Scorecard

Titans; 376/6 (50 overs)	v	North West; 243 (39.5 overs)
Rivaldo Moonsamy 102 (89); Caleb Seleka 3/72 (10 overs)		Janneman Malan 92* (97); Neil Brand 3/56 (10 overs)

Titans won by 133 runs
Absa Puk Oval, Potchefstroom
Umpires: Mazizi Gampu and Siphelele Gasa
Player of the match: Rivaldo Moonsamy (Titans)

- Titans won the toss and elected to bat.
- Points: Titans 5, North West 0

7 March 2025
13:00 (D/N)
Scorecard

Knights; 196 (50 overs)	v	Dolphins; 197/5 (46.2 overs)
Tiaan van Vuuren 54 (76); Tristan Luus 3/52 (10 overs)		Jason Smith 71 (96); Aaron Phangiso 2/32 (10 overs)

Dolphins won by 5 wickets
Kingsmead Cricket Ground, Durban
Umpires: Lubabalo Gcuma and Dennis Smith
Player of the match: Hanu Viljoen (Dolphins)

- Knights won the toss and elected to bat.
- Points: Dolphins 4, Knights 0

9 March 2025
10:00
Scorecard

Western Province; 182 (45.2 overs)	v	Boland; 183/5 (43.3 overs)
Edward Moore 51 (73); Shaun von Berg 3/44 (10 overs)		Blayde Capell 59 (96); Wesley Bedja 3/27 (7 overs)

Boland won by 5 wickets
Boland Park, Paarl
Umpires: Marais Erasmus and Thomas Mokorosi
Player of the match: Blayde Capell (Boland)

- Boland won the toss and elected to field.
- Points: Boland 4, Western Province 0

9 March 2025
10:00
Scorecard

Warriors; 279 /5 (50 overs)	v	Lions; 124/1 (22.2 overs)
Connor Esterhuizen 87* (80); Patrick Kruger 2/38 (9 overs)		Matthew De Villiers 49* (60); Bjorn Fortuin 1/25 (6 overs)

Warriors won by 33 runs (DLS method)
St George's Park, Gqeberha
Umpires: Abongile Sodumo and Warren Wyngaard
Player of the match: Matthew De Villiers (Warriors)

- Lions won the toss and elected to field.
- No further play was possible due to rain.
- Matthew De Villiers (Warriors) made his List A debut.
- Points: Warriors 5, Lions 0

9 March 2025
13:00 (D/N)
Scorecard

Knights; 230 (50 overs)	v	Titans; 236/3 (38.3 overs)
Patrick Botha 109* (146); Dayyaan Galiem 3/38 (10 overs)		Dewald Brevis 83* (38); Tiaan van Vuuren 2/44 (8 overs)

Titans won by 7 wickets
Mangaung Oval, Bloemfontein
Umpires: Stephen Harris and Bongani Jele
Player of the match: Dewald Brevis (Titans)

- Titans won the toss and elected to field.
- Points: Titans 5, Knights 0

9 March 2025
13:00 (D/N)
Scorecard

North West; 246/7 (50 overs)	v	Dolphins; 216/3 (34.5 overs)
Wihan Lubbe 69 (86); Prenelan Subrayen 2/22 (10 overs)		JJ Smuts 75 (73); Ruan de Swardt 1/34 (8 overs)

Dolphins won by 7 wickets (DLS method)
Absa Puk Oval, Potchefstroom
Umpires: Allahuddien Paleker and Siphelele Gasa
Player of the match: JJ Smuts (Dolphins)

- Dolphins won the toss and elected to field.
- The second innings was reduced to 40 overs due to rain.
- Dolphins were set a revised target of 211 runs from 40 overs.
- Points: Dolphins 4, North West 0

== Division 2 fixtures ==
15 February 2025
10:00
Scorecard

Northern Cape; 218 (47.5 overs)	v	Border; 221/3 (39.5 overs)
Modiri Litheko 91 (95); Nico van Zyl 3/35 (8 overs)		Nathan Roux 116* (117); Romano Terblanche 1/25 (3 overs)

Border won by 7 wickets
Buffalo Park, East London
Umpires: Bongani Ntshebe and Dan van der Merwe

- Northern Cape won the toss and elected to bat.
- Christopher Gleaves and Lihle Sizani (Border) both made their List A debuts.
- Nathan Roux (Border) scored his first century in List A cricket.
- Points: Border 5, Northern Cape 0

16 February 2025
09:30
Scorecard

KwaZulu-Natal Inland; 256/6 (50 overs)	v	Mpumalanga; 161 (41.4 overs)
Jack Lees 63 (92); Luco Van Der Walt 2/42 (10 overs)		Hermann Rolfes 48 (60); Ziyaad Abrahams 3/20 (7 overs)

KwaZulu-Natal Inland won by 95 runs
Uplands College, White River
Umpires: Kerrin Klaaste and Jurie Sadler

- Mpumalanga won the toss and elected to field.
- Hermann Rolfes, Luco Van Der Walt (Mpumalanga), Sam Brown, Sean Gilson, Chad Laycock and Jack Lees (KwaZulu-Natal Inland) all made their List A debuts.
- Points: KwaZulu-Natal Inland 5, Mpumalanga 0

16 February 2025
10:00
Scorecard

Easterns; 231 (35.5 overs)	v	South Africa Emerging Players; 125/7 (26.5 overs)
Grant Thomson 59 (47); Raeeq Daniels 4/38 (6.5 overs)		Jorich Van Schalkwyk 47 (60); Shaveer Khan 3/30 (4.5 overs)

Easterns won by 60 runs (DLS method)
Tuks Cricket Oval, Pretoria
Umpires: Muhammad Jooma and Khawulani Ntuli

- South Africa Emerging Players won the toss and elected to field.
- The match was reduced to 36 overs per side due to rain.
- No further play was possible due to rain.
- Raeeq Daniels, Bandile Mbatha, Nqobani Mokoena, Kamo Phiri, Jason Rowles, Ludwich Schuld, Steve Stolk, Jorich Van Schalkwyk (South Africa Emerging Players), Shaveer Khan and Jason van Dyk (Easterns) all made their List A debuts
- Points: Easterns 5, South Africa Emerging Players 0

16 February 2025
10:00
Scorecard

Limpopo; 188 (41.4 overs)	v	South Western Districts; 191/6 (39.4 overs)
Jan Coetzer 49 (53); Lifa Ntanzi 5/59 (8.4 overs)		Luke Beaufort 51 (62); Don Radebe 2/24 (6.4 overs)

South Western Districts won by 4 wickets
Cricket Club Ground, Polokwane
Umpires: Lauren Agenbag and Willhelm Nell

- South Western Districts won the toss and elected to field.
- The match was reduced to 45 overs per side due to rain.
- Jan Coetzer, Thabo Mosefowa, Alex Pillay (Limpopo) and George Van Heerden (South Western Districts) all made their List A debuts.
- Lifa Ntanzi (South Western Districts) took his first five-wicket haul in List A cricket.
- Points: South Western Districts 4, Limpopo 0

19 February 2025
09:30
Scorecard

KwaZulu-Natal Inland	v	Limpopo

Match abandoned
City Oval, Pietermaritzburg
Umpires: Lauren Agenbag and Muhammad Jooma

- No toss.
- No play was possible due to rain.
- Points: KwaZulu-Natal Inland 2, Limpopo 2

19 February 2025
10:00
Scorecard

South Western Districts; 261/7 (50 overs)	v	Mpumalanga; 265/5 (44.1 overs)
George Van Heerden 110* (128); Themba Maupa 4/44 (10 overs)		Benjamin van Niekerk 89* (83); Kelly Smuts 3/33 (7 overs)

Mpumalanga won by 6 wickets
Recreation Ground, Oudtshoorn
Umpires: Kerrin Klaaste and Willhelm Nell

- South Western Districts won the toss and elected to bat.
- George Van Heerden (South Western Districts) scored his first century in List A cricket.
- Points: Mpumalanga 4, South Western Districts 0

19 February 2025
10:00
Scorecard

South Africa Emerging Players; 131 (41.1 overs)	v	Northern Cape; 119/5 (25.5 overs)
Jorich Van Schalkwyk 33 (71); Hardus Viljoen 3/30 (7.1 overs)		Modiri Litheko 33 (46); Schalk Engelbrecht 3/24 (8 overs)

Northern Cape won by 5 wickets (DLS method)
De Beers Diamond Oval, Kimberley
Umpires: Jan Erasmus and Waldo Lategan

- Northern Cape won the toss and elected to field.
- The second innings was reduced to 36 overs due to rain
- Northern Cape were set a revised target of 118 runs from 36 overs.
- Cole Abrahams, Abel Mokwena (Northern Cape), Lethabo Phahlamohlaka and Ntando Soni (South Africa Emerging Players) all made their List A debuts.
- Points: Northern Cape 5, South Africa Emerging Players 0

19 February 2025
10:00
Scorecard

Easterns	v	Border

Match abandoned
Willowmoore Park, Benoni
Umpires: Jurie Sadler and Ettiene van der Merwe

- No toss.
- No play was possible due to rain.
- Points: Easterns 2, Border 2

22 February 2025
09:30
Scorecard

South Africa Emerging Players; 245/9 (50 overs)	v	Mpumalanga; 247/3 (42.2 overs)
Lethabo Phahlamohlaka 57 (57); Hermann Rolfes 2/46 (9 overs)		Yassar Cook 83* (106); Ntando Soni 1/49 (7 overs)

Mpumalanga won by 7 wickets
Uplands College, White River
Umpires: Jan Erasmus and Mthokozisi Shezi

- Mpumalanga won the toss and elected to field.
- Points: Mpumalanga 4, South Africa Emerging Players 0

22 February 2025
10:00
Scorecard

Limpopo; 222 (50 overs)	v	Border; 223/3 (40.5 overs)
Sizwe Masondo 76 (95); Aphiwe Mnyanda 4/34 (10 overs)		Jerome Bossr 114* (131); Eldred Hawken 2/39 (10 overs)

Border won by 7 wickets
Cricket Club Ground, Polokwane
Umpires: Gladman Gaseba and Jurie Sadler

- Limpopo won the toss and elected to bat.
- Sibusiso Mxube and Heinrigh Pieterse (Limpopo) both made their List A debuts.
- Jerome Bossr (Border) scored his first century in List A cricket.
- Points: Border 4, Limpopo 0

23 February 2025
09:30
Scorecard

Easterns; 262/9 (50 overs)	v	KwaZulu-Natal Inland; 263/5 (48.4 overs)
Danie Rossouw 70 (74); Sean Whitehead 2/38 (10 overs)		Cameron Shekleton 88 (90); Amaan Khan 2/58 (9.4 overs)

KwaZulu-Natal Inland won by 5 wickets
City Oval, Pietermaritzburg
Umpires: Khawulani Ntuli and Warren Wyngaard

- Easterns won the toss and elected to bat.
- Kyle Landsberg (Easterns) and Ntando Zuma (KwaZulu-Natal Inland) both made their List A debuts.
- Points: KwaZulu-Natal Inland 4, Easterns 0

23 February 2025
10:00
Scorecard

South Western Districts; 142 (45.5 overs)	v	Northern Cape; 145/5 (31.1 overs)
Kelly Smuts 68 (89); Romano Terblanche 4/35 (10 overs)		Cole Abrahams 53 (53); Pheko Moletsane 2/35 (8 overs)

Northern Cape won by 5 wickets
De Beers Diamond Oval, Kimberley
Umpires: Stacy Lackay and Willhelm Nell

- Northern Cape won the toss and elected to field.
- Points: Northern Cape 5, South Western Districts 0

26 February 2025
09:30
Scorecard

Easterns; 203 (44.3 overs)	v	Mpumalanga; 193/6 (39 overs)
Grant Thomson 74 (83); Gareth Dukes 5/25 (10 overs)		Yassar Cook 67 (101); Andrew Rasemene 2/40 (7 overs)

Mpumalanga won by 4 wickets (DLS method)
Uplands College, White River
Umpires: Kerrin Klaaste and Dan van der Merwe

- Easterns won the toss and elected to bat.
- The second innings was reduced to 41 overs due to rain.
- Mpumalanga were set a revised target of 191 runs from 41 overs.
- Points: Mpumalanga 4, Easterns 0

26 February 2025
10:00
Scorecard

KwaZulu-Natal Inland; 324/3 (50 overs)	v	Border; 222 (40.3 overs)
Sean Gilson 132* (118); Aphiwe Mnyanda 2/76 (10 overs)		Jerome Bossr 101 (114); Ziyaad Abrahams 5/29 (7.3 overs)

KwaZulu-Natal Inland won by 82 runs (DLS method)
Buffalo Park, East London
Umpires: Gladman Gaseba and Abongile Sodumo

- Border won the toss and elected to field.
- The second innings was reduced to 45 overs due to rain.
- Border were set a revised target of 305 runs from 45 overs.
- Sean Gilson (KwaZulu-Natal Inland) scored his first century in List A cricket.
- Ziyaad Abrahams (KwaZulu-Natal Inland) took his first five-wicket haul in List A cricket.
- Points: KwaZulu-Natal Inland 5, Border 0

26 February 2025
10:00
Scorecard

Northern Cape; 167/8 (23 overs)	v	Limpopo; 122/7 (23 overs)
Ruan Haasbroek 48 (44); Ludwig Kaestner 3/13 (2 overs)		Alex Pillay 36 (44); Romano Terblanche 3/25 (4 overs)

Northern Cape won by 45 runs
Cricket Club Ground, Polokwane
Umpires: Lauren Agenbag and Jurie Sadler

- Limpopo won the toss and elected to field.
- The match was reduced to 23 overs per side due to rain.
- Points: Northern Cape 5, Limpopo 0

26 February 2025
10:00
Scorecard

South Western Districts; 258 (47.4 overs)	v	South Africa Emerging Players; 206 (41.3 overs)
Kelly Smuts 71 (76); Thabile Hlatuka 5/67 (8.4 overs)		Garnett Tarr 50 (81); Rayyaan Rhode 3/34 (10 overs)

South Western Districts won by 52 runs
Tuks Cricket Oval, Pretoria
Umpires: Waldo Lategan and Allahudien Paleker

- South Africa Emerging Players won the toss and elected to field.
- Ben Hockly and Armaan Manack (South Africa Emerging Players) both made their List A debuts.
- Thabile Hlatuka (South Africa Emerging Players) took his first five-wicket haul in List A cricket.
- Points: South Western Districts 5, South Africa Emerging Players 0

1 March 2025
09:30
Scorecard

KwaZulu-Natal Inland; 203 (43.3 overs)	v	South Western Districts; 157 (43.2 overs)
Cameron Shekleton 65 (73); Pheko Moletsane 3/44 (10 overs)		George Van Heerden 27 (35); Chad Laycock 3/26 (8 overs)

KwaZulu-Natal Inland won by 46 runs
City Oval, Pietermaritzburg
Umpires: Jan Erasmus and Jurie Sadler

- South Western Districts won the toss and elected to field.
- Points: KwaZulu-Natal Inland 5, South Western Districts 0

1 March 2025
10:00
Scorecard

Easterns; 211/7 (42 overs)	v	Northern Cape; 212/6 (39.2 overs)
Christopher Britz 55 (75); Hardus Viljoen 3/35 (9 overs)		Jonathan Vandiar 60 (71); Martin Khumalo 2/48 (8 overs)

Northern Cape won by 4 wickets
Willowmoore Park, Benoni
Umpires: Stacy Lackay and Waldo Lategan

- Northern Cape won the toss and elected to field.
- The match was reduced to 42 overs per side due to rain.
- Points: Northern Cape 4, Easterns 0

2 March 2025
10:00
Scorecard

Mpumalanga; 282 (49.3 overs)	v	Border; 264/6 (44.3 overs)
Jurie Snyman 106 (108); Aphiwe Mnyanda 3/51 (8.3 overs)		Jason Niemand 66 (56); Themba Maupa 3/42 (6 overs)

Border won by 4 wickets (DLS method)
Buffalo Park, East London
Umpires: Gladman Gaseba and Ettiene van der Merwe

- Mpumalanga won the toss and elected to bat.
- The second innings was reduced to 45 overs due to rain.
- Border were set a revised target of 264 runs from 45 overs.
- Points: Border 4, Mpumalanga 0

2 March 2025
10:00
Scorecard

South Africa Emerging Players; 200 (47 overs)	v	Limpopo; 169 (43.2 overs)
Garnett Tarr 71 (57); Don Radebe 4/22 (10 overs)		Louren Steenkamp 57 (75); Nqobani Mokoena 4/26 (9.2 overs)

South Africa Emerging Players won by 31 runs
Cricket Club Ground, Polokwane
Umpires: Khawulani Ntuli and Mthokozisi Shezi

- Limpopo won the toss and elected to field.
- Muhammed Bulbulia (South Africa Emerging Players) made his List A debut.
- Points: South Africa Emerging Players 4, Limpopo 0

5 March 2025
09:30
Scorecard

Limpopo; 175 (46 overs)	v	Mpumalanga; 176/3 (28.4 overs)
Heinrigh Pieterse 56 (95); Hermann Rolfes 4/24 (8 overs)		Muhammed Mayet 68* (58); Don Radebe 2/31 (6 overs)

Mpumalanga won by 7 wickets
Uplands College, White River
Umpires: Jan Erasmus and Mthokozisi Shezi

- Limpopo won the toss and elected to bat.
- Points: Mpumalanga 5, Limpopo 0

5 March 2025
10:00
Scorecard

South Western Districts; 233/8 (50 overs)	v	Easterns; 181 (38.3 overs)
Pheko Moletsane 100 (131); Kabelo Sekhukhune 3/29 (8 overs)		Jason van Dyk 50 (70); Thomas Kaber 4/40 (10 overs)

South Western Districts won by 52 runs
Recreation Ground, Oudtshoorn
Umpires: Kerrin Klaaste and Dan van der Merwe

- South Western Districts won the toss and elected to bat.
- Pheko Moletsane (South Western Districts) scored his first century in List A cricket.
- Points: South Western Districts 5, Easterns 0

5 March 2025
10:00
Scorecard

Northern Cape	v	KwaZulu-Natal Inland

Match abandoned
De Beers Diamond Oval, Kimberley
Umpires: Willhelm Nell and Warren Wyngaard

- No toss.
- No play was possible due to rain.
- Points: KwaZulu-Natal Inland 2, Northern Cape 2

5 March 2025
10:00
Scorecard

South Africa Emerging Players	v	Border

Match abandoned
Tuks Cricket Oval, Pretoria
Umpires: Muhammad Jooma and Waldo Lategan

- No toss.
- No play was possible due to rain.
- Points: Border 2, South Africa Emerging Players 2

9 March 2025
10:00
Scorecard

South Western Districts; 257/5 (50 overs)	v	Border; 258/8 (39.4 overs)
Luke Beaufort 75 (89); Nico van Zyl 2/34 (10 overs)		Nathan Roux 53 (43); Pheko Moletsane 3/37 (6.4 overs)

Border won by 2 wickets
Recreation Ground, Oudtshoorn
Umpires: Kerrin Klaaste and Andre Olivier

- South Western Districts won the toss and elected to bat.
- Points: Border 5, South Western Districts 0

9 March 2025
10:00
Scorecard

Mpumalanga; 205/9 (50 overs)	v	Northern Cape; 177 (46.5 overs)
Hermann Rolfes 28 (51); Romano Terblanche 4/25 (10 overs)		Christoffel Klijnhans 49 (81); Kurtlyn Mannikam 3/44 (8 overs)

Mpumalanga won by 28 runs
De Beers Diamond Oval, Kimberley
Umpires: Jan Erasmus and Waldo Lategan

- Northern Cape won the toss and elected to field.
- Points: Mpumalanga 4, Northern Cape 0

9 March 2025
10:00
Scorecard

Easterns; 244/8 (50 overs)	v	Limpopo; 173/9 (46 overs)
Grant Thomson 56 (78); Jan Coetzer 4/54 (9 overs)		Alex Pillay 37 (85); Amaan Khan 3/24 (10 overs)

Easterns won by 59 runs (DLS method)
Willowmoore Park, Benoni
Umpires: Muhammad Jooma and Khawulani Ntuli

- Limpopo won the toss and elected to field.
- The second innings was reduced to 46 overs due to rain.
- Limpopo were set a revised target of 233 runs from 46 overs due to rain.
- Points: Easterns 5, Limpopo 0

9 March 2025
10:00
Scorecard

KwaZulu-Natal Inland; 311/7 (50 overs)	v	South Africa Emerging Players; 272/9 (50 overs)
Jack Lees 137 (130); Steve Stolk 3/39 (6 overs)		Jason Rowles 60 (66); Chad Laycock 3/42 (9 overs)

KwaZulu-Natal Inland won by 39 runs
Tuks Cricket Oval, Pretoria
Umpires: Gladman Gaseba and Phillip Vosloo

- South Africa Emerging Players won the toss and elected to field.
- Paul James, Adnaan Lagadien, Buyanda Majola and Nathan Rossouw (South Africa Emerging Players) all made their List A debut.
- Jack Lees (KwaZulu-Natal Inland) scored his first century in List A cricket.
- Points: KwaZulu-Natal Inland 4, South Africa Emerging Players 0

== Knockout stage ==
=== Division One ===
Qualifier			Final
			1	Boland	247/8 (50 overs)
2	Dolphins	228/8 (50 overs)	2	Dolphins	248/6 (49.1 overs)
3	Titans	163 (36.4 overs)

Qualifier
12 March 2025
13:00 (D/N)
Scorecard

Dolphins; 228/8 (50 overs)	v	Titans; 163 (36.4 overs)
Hanu Viljoen 57 (65); Andile Phehlukwayo 4/28 (10 overs)		Dewald Brevis 36 (25); Keshav Maharaj 3/37 (10 overs)

Dolphins won by 65 runs
Kingsmead Cricket Ground, Durban
Umpires: Stephen Harris and Arno Jacobs
Player of the match: Hanu Viljoen (Dolphins)

- Titans won the toss and elected to field.

Final
16 March 2025
10:15
Scorecard

Boland; 247/8 (50 overs)	v	Dolphins; 248/6 (49.1 overs)
Ayabulela Gqamane 69 (77); Tristan Luus 2/32 (6 overs)		JJ Smuts 91 (111); Siyabonga Mahima 2/38 (10 overs)

Dolphins won by 4 wickets
Boland Park, Paarl
Umpires: Lubabalo Gcuma and Allahudien Paleker
Player of the match: JJ Smuts (Dolphins)

- Dolphins won the toss and elected to field.

=== Division Two ===
Final
14–15 March 2025
10:00
Scorecard

Border; 82/0 (15 overs)	v	KwaZulu-Natal Inland
Jerome Bossr 44* (46)

No result
City Oval, Pietermaritzburg
Umpires: Kerrin Klaaste and Jurie Sadler

- KwaZulu-Natal Inland won the toss and elected to field.
- Rain prevented any further play.
