= 2024–25 CSA 4-Day Series =

Cricket tournament

- Dates: 30 October 2024 – 14 April 2025
- Administrator: Cricket South Africa
- Cricket format: First-class
- Tournament format: Single round-robin
- Participants: 15
- Matches: 51
- Most runs: Div 1: Jordan Hermann (602); Div 2: George Van Heerden (515)
- Most wickets: Div 1: Shaun von Berg (35); Div 2: Jade de Klerk (44)

The 2024–25 CSA 4-Day Franchise Series is the 118th CSA 4-Day Domestic Series cricket season in South Africa. As in 2023, Division One had eight teams and Division Two had seven teams. The competition took place in South Africa from 30 October 2024 to 14 April 2025.

== Teams ==
Division One
Team	Location	Capacity	Province
Boland	Boland Park, Paarl	10,000	Western Cape
Dolphins	Kingsmead, Durban	25,000	KwaZulu-Natal
Lions	Wanderers Stadium, Johannesburg	34,000	Gauteng
KwaZulu-Natal (Inland)	City Oval, Pietermaritzburg	12,000	KwaZulu-Natal
North West Dragons	Absa Puk Oval, Potchefstroom	18,000	North West
Titans	Centurion Park, Centurion, South Africa	22,000	Gauteng
Warriors	St George's Park, Gqeberha	19,000	Eastern Cape
Western Province	Newlands, Cape Town	25,000	Western Cape

Division Two
Team	Location	Capacity	Province
Border	Buffalo Park, East London	20,000	Eastern Cape
Easterns	Willowmoore Park, Benoni	20,000	Gauteng
Knights	Mangaung Oval, Bloemfontein	20,000	Free State
Limpopo	Polokwane Cricket Club, Polokwane		Limpopo
Mpumalanga	Uplands College, White River		Mpumalanga
Northern Cape	De Beers Diamond Oval, Kimberley	11,000	Northern Cape
South Western Districts	Recreation Ground, Oudtshoorn		Western Cape

== Points Table ==
=== Division 1 Standings ===
Pos	Team	Pld	W	L	D	Pts	Qualification
1	Lions	7	3	0	4	115.14	Advance to the Final
2	Titans	7	2	2	3	108.56	Advance to the Final
3	Dolphins	7	2	2	3	97.66	
4	Boland	7	1	1	5	97	
5	Western Province	7	2	1	4	93.84	
6	Knights	7	1	2	4	80.96	
7	North West	7	0	1	6	76.92	
8	Warriors	7	1	3	3	72.34	

Source: ESPNcricinfo

=== Division 2 Standings ===
Pos	Team	Pld	W	L	D	Pts	Qualification
1	KwaZulu-Natal Inland	6	3	1	2	104.88	Advance to the Final
2	Northern Cape	6	5	0	1	103.24	Advance to the Final
3	Mpumalanga	6	2	1	3	92.22	
4	Border	6	2	3	1	78.7	
5	South Western Districts	6	2	3	1	71.6	
6	Limpopo	6	1	3	2	61.26	
7	Easterns	6	1	5	0	48.36	

Source: ESPNcricinfo
Rules for classification: Points system: 16 for a win, 8 for a tie, 6 for a draw.
- Batting bonus points: in the first innings only, 1 point for reaching 150 runs, then 0.02 points for each run thereafter.
- Bowling bonus points: in the first innings only, 1 point for taking three wickets, then 1 point for each two wickets thereafter.

== Division 1 Fixtures ==
=== Round 1 ===
30 October–2 November 2024
Scorecard

Western Province	v	Dolphins
212 (72.5 overs); Daniel Smith 92 (139); Prenelan Subrayen 3/49 (19.5 overs)		196 (65.3 overs); Sarel Erwee 48 (99); Kyle Simmonds 6/60 (22.3 overs)
225 (77 overs); Jonathan Bird 64 (144); Prenelan Subrayen 7/61 (36 overs)		190/9 (50.2 overs); Romashan Pillay 66 (51); Kyle Simmonds 3/75 (21.2 overs)

Western Province won by 51 runs
Kingsmead Cricket Ground, Durban
Umpires: Siphelele Gasa and Dennis Smith
Player of the match: Kyle Simmonds (Western Province)

- Western Province won the toss and elected to bat.
- Romashan Pillay (Dolphins) made his first-class debut.
- Points: Western Province 22.24, Dolphins 5.92

31 October–3 November 2024
Scorecard

Knights	v	Boland
266 (97.4 overs); Aaron Phangiso 73 (99); Shaun von Berg 4/61 (20.4 overs)		266 (85.4 overs); Clyde Fortuin 54 (91); Johannes van Dyk 4/46 (17 overs)
291 (85.4 overs); Dian Forrester 71 (99); Shaun von Berg 3/79 (23 overs)		122 (46.2 overs); Keith Dudgeon 24 (38); Johannes van Dyk 5/28 (12 overs)

Knights won by 169 runs
Boland Park, Paarl
Umpires: Marais Erasmus and Andre Olivier
Player of the match: Aaron Phangiso (Knights)

- Knights won the toss and elected to bat.
- Points: Knights 23.32, Boland 7.32

31 October–3 November 2024
Scorecard

Warriors	v	North West
298 (87.1 overs); Jordan Hermann 99 (184); Ruan de Swardt 5/52 (20.1 overs)		239 (68.4 overs); Ruan de Swardt 92 (160); Beyers Swanepoel 4/65 (20.4 overs)
386/8d (106 overs); Patrick Kruger 79 (79); Wihan Lubbe 3/94 (21 overs)		328/8 (107 overs); Ruan de Swardt 87* (186); Beyers Swanepoel 3/51 (22 overs)

Match drawn
St George's Park, Gqeberha
Umpires: Arno Jacobs and Abongile Sodumo
Player of the match: Ruan de Swardt (North West)

- Warriors won the toss and elected to bat.
- Matthew De Villiers (Warriors) made his first-class debut.
- Ruan de Swardt (North West) took his first five-wicket haul in first-class cricket.
- Points: Warriors 13.96, North West 12.78

5–8 November 2024
Scorecard

Lions	v	Titans
316 (107.3 overs); Zubayr Hamza 84 (136); Corbin Bosch 4/71 (29 overs)		302 (79.4 overs); Andile Phehlukwayo 88 (254); Lutho Sipamla 4/83 (21 overs)
295/9d (77 overs); Bjorn Fortuin 116 (95); Corbin Bosch 2/60 (16 overs)		156 (52.5 overs); Corbin Bosch 44* (93); Codi Yusuf 4/36 (13 overs)

Lions won by 153 runs
Wanderers Stadium, Johannesburg
Umpires: Mazizi Gampu and Brad White
Player of the match: Bjorn Fortuin (Lions)

- Lions won the toss and elected to bat.
- Khaya Fakude (Lions) made his first-class debut.
- Points: Lions 23.7, Titans 7.04

=== Round 2 ===
7–10 November 2024
Scorecard

Boland	v	Warriors
500 (145.1 overs); Aviwe Mgijima 122 (214); Jason Raubenheimer 4/106 (28.1 overs)		163 (73.4 overs); Ethan Frosler 30 (63); Shaun von Berg 8/54 (21.4 overs)
		326 (117.5 overs) (f/o); Jordan Hermann 152 (305); Ayabulela Gqamane 4/48 (13.5 overs)

Boland won by an innings and 11 runs
Boland Park, Paarl
Umpires: Thomas Mokorosi and Warren Wyngaard
Player of the match: Shaun von Berg (Boland)

- Boland won the toss and elected to bat.
- Points: Boland 24.7, Warriors 2.26

7–10 November 2024
Scorecard

North West	v	Knights
232/9d (84.3 overs); Ruan de Swardt 67 (152); Matthew Pollard 2/36 (15 overs)		350 (89.5 overs); Lesego Senokwane 205 (264); Migael Pretorius 4/85 (26 overs)
221/3 (83 overs); Raynard van Tonder 84* (178); Malusi Siboto 2/44 (13 overs)

Match drawn
Mangaung Oval, Bloemfontein
Umpires: Siphelele Gasa and Philip Vosloo
Player of the match: Lesego Senokwane (Knights)

- North West won the toss and elected to bat.
- Points: North West 12.64, Knights 15

12–15 November 2024
Scorecard

Titans	v	Dolphins
418/7d (107.1 overs); Dewald Brevis 159 (172); Prenelan Subrayen 2/105 (34.1 overs)		365 (100.2 overs); Jason Smith 87 (149); Tsepo Ndwandwa 5/124 (36 overs)

Match drawn
Kingsmead Cricket Ground, Durban
Umpires: Mazizi Gampu and Dennis Smith
Player of the match: Dewald Brevis (Titans)

- No play was possible on day 1 due to rain and wet outfield.
- Banele Cele (Dolphins) made his first-class debut.
- Points: Titans 15.22, Dolphins 13.3

=== Round 3 ===
14–17 November 2024
Scorecard

Western Province	v	Warriors
464 (126.2 overs); George Linde 152 (245); Beyers Swanepoel 3/90 (22 overs)		266/9 (100.5 overs); Beyers Swanepoel 65* (106); Kyle Simmonds 4/66 (34.1 overs)
162/8d (47.2 overs); George Linde 57 (86); Duanne Olivier 3/31 (9 overs)		231/8 (108 overs); Jordan Hermann 98 (170); Kyle Simmonds 4/66 (40 overs)

Match drawn
Newlands Cricket Ground, Cape Town
Umpires: Marais Erasmus and Warren Wyngaard
Player of the match: George Linde (Western Province)

- Western Province won the toss and elected to bat.
- Points: Western Province 15.1, Warriors 12.28

14–17 November 2024
Scorecard

North West	v	Lions
425/6d (137.3 overs); Raynard van Tonder 120 (221); Tshepo Moreki 3/69 (21 overs)		399/9d (100 overs); Bjorn Fortuin 120 (140); Ruan de Swardt 5/67 (26 overs)
136/0 (52 overs); Matthew Kleinveldt 76* (163)

Match drawn
JB Marks Oval, Potchefstroom
Umpires: Lauren Agenbag and Abdoellah Steenkamp
Player of the match: Bjorn Fortuin (Lions)

- North West won the toss and elected to bat.
- Jaydon Brooker (North West) made his first-class debut.
- Points: North West 13.96, Lions 12.98

19–22 November 2024
Scorecard

Titans	v	Knights
307 (91.5 overs); Matthew Boast 75 (145); Tiaan van Vuuren 3/63 (18 overs)		193 (69 overs); Lesego Senokwane 34 (69); Tsepo Ndwandwa 5/33 (15 overs)
167 (61.5 overs); Neil Brand 71* (88); Dane Piedt 4/24 (12.5 overs)		163 (47.4 overs); Patrick Botha 71* (169); Tsepo Ndwandwa 3/36 (14 overs)

Titans won by 118 runs
Centurion Park, Centurion
Umpires: Lubabalo Gcuma and Bongani Jele
Player of the match: Matthew Boast (Titans)

- Titans won the toss and elected to bat.
- Merrick Brett replaced Andile Phehlukwayo as a concussion substitute for Titans during first innings of Titans.
- Points: Titans 24.14, Knights 5.86

21–24 November 2024
Scorecard

Lions	v	Western Province
403/6d (126 overs); Dominic Hendricks 161* (370); Kyle Simmonds 2/68 (23)		208 (55.5 overs); George Linde 46 (66); Codi Yusuf 5/71 (18.5 overs)
121 (52.4 overs); Delano Potgieter 54 (112); Mthiwekhaya Nabe 3/37 (13 overs)		191 (74 overs); Jonathan Bird 38 (63); Tshepo Moreki 4/44 (19 overs)

Lions won by 125 runs
Wanderers Stadium, Johannesburg
Umpires: Marais Erasmus and Abongile Sodumo
Player of the match: Dominic Hendricks (Lions)

- Lions won the toss and elected to bat.
- Bongi Mfunelwa and Jody Lawrence (Western Province) both made their firsst-class debuts.
- Points: Lions 23.46, Western Province 2.16

=== Round 4 ===
28 November–1 December 2024
Scorecard

Dolphins	v	Knights
570/9d (145.2 overs); Bryce Parsons 118 (197); Malusi Siboto 2/58 (19 overs)		315 (99.3 overs); Lesego Senokwane 108 (194); Okuhle Cele 4/66 (21 overs)
		239 (94.3 overs) (f/o); Lesego Senokwane 61 (148); Prenelan Subrayen 5/68 (40.3 overs)

Dolphins won by an innings and 16 runs
Mangaung Oval, Bloemfontein
Umpires: Mazizi Gampu and Thomas Mokorosi
Player of the match: Prenelan Subrayen (Dolphins)

- Dolphins won the toss and elected to bat.
- Slade van Staden (Dolphins) scored his first century in first-class cricket.
- Points: Dolphins 25.56, Knights 5.3

28 November–1 December 2024
Scorecard

Lions	v	Warriors
291 (92.3 overs); Dominic Hendricks 89 (200); Beyers Swanepoel 5/61 (22 overs)		94 (22.3 overs); Sinethemba Qeshile 38 (52); Tshepo Moreki 3/17 (6.3 overs)
214/8d (63 overs); Muhammad Manack 49 (71); Christopher King 3/37 (12 overs)		211 (47.4 overs); Jordan Hermann 67 (71); Lutho Sipamla 4/42 (12.4 overs)

Lions won by 200 runs
Wanderers Stadium, Johannesburg
Umpires: Bongani Jele and Andre Olivier
Player of the match: Dominic Hendricks (Lions)

- Lions won the toss and elected to bat.
- Ethan Frosler replaced Beyers Swanepoel as a concussion substitute for Warriors during first innings of Warriors.
- Points: Lions 23.82, Warriors 4

28 November–1 December 2024
Scorecard

Boland	v	North West
594/6d (132.5 overs); Grant Roelofsen 240 (317); Ruan de Swardt 3/107 (29 overs)		458 (139.2 overs); Matthew Kleinveldt 133 (192); Shaun von Berg 4/106 (43 overs)
150/4 (53 overs); Blayde Capell 57 (99); Ruan de Swardt 1/15 (5 overs)

Match drawn
JB Marks Oval, Potchefstroom
Umpires: Allahudien Paleker and Phillip Vosloo
Player of the match: Grant Roelofsen (Boland)

- Boland won the toss and elected to bat.
- Blayde Capell replaced Grant Roelofsen as a concussion substitute for Boland during second innings of Boland.
- Points: Boland 14.78, North West 11.04

=== Round 5 ===
6–9 December 2024
Scorecard

Western Province	v	Knights
202 (81.2 overs); Onke Nyaku 63 (215); Tiaan van Vuuren 4/39 (14 overs)		373/8d (98.5 overs); Isaac Dikgale 84 (211); Kyle Simmonds 5/77 (26 overs)
87/1 (57 overs); Jonathan Bird 54 (167); Malusi Siboto 1/6 (7 overs)

Match drawn
Newlands Cricket Ground, Cape Town
Umpires: Abdoellah Steenkamp and Phillip Vosloo
Player of the match: Kyle Simmonds (Western Province)

- Western Province won the toss and elected to bat.
- No play was possible on day 1 due to rain.
- Oliver Whitehead (Western Province) made his first-class debut.
- Points: Western Province 11.04, Knights 15.46

19–22 December 2024
Scorecard

Warriors	v	Titans
157 (41.3 overs); Jordan Hermann 39 (47); Junior Dala 5/27 (10.3 overs)		342 (83.5 overs); Lhuan-dre Pretorius 120 (184); Beyers Swanepoel 5/54 (21.5 overs)
244 (63.1 overs); Sinethemba Qeshile 85 (141); Tsepo Ndwandwa 3/46 (11.1 overs)		63/0 (20.5 overs); Neil Brand 44* (68)

Titans won by 10 wickets
St George's Park, Gqeberha
Umpires: Arno Jacobs and Abongile Sodumo
Player of the match: Lhuan-dre Pretorius (Titans)

- Warriors won the toss and elected to bat.
- Lhuan-dre Pretorius (Titans) scored his first century on first-class debut.
- Points: Titans 24.84, Warriors 5.14

19–22 December 2024
Scorecard

Boland	v	Dolphins
381/7d (100 overs); Gavin Kaplan 122* (231); Prenelan Subrayen 3/84 (31 overs)		319 (82.5 overs); Hanu Viljoen 85 (195); Glenton Stuurman 5/59 (16.5 overs)
156/8 (51 overs); Clyde Fortuin 44 (60); Okuhle Cele 3/38 (10 overs)

Match drawn
Kingsmead Cricket Ground, Durban
Umpires: Dennis Smith and Brad White
Player of the match: Prenelan Subrayen (Dolphins)

- Dolphins won the toss and elected to field.
- No play was possible on day 1 due to rain.
- Boland 15.62, Dolphins 13.48

=== Round 6 ===
20–23 March 2025
Scorecard

Boland	v	Lions
229 (87.3 overs); Clyde Fortuin 61 (154); Bjorn Fortuin 6/83 (35.3 overs)		259 (78.4 overs); Zubayr Hamza 83 (109); Shaun von Berg 4/82 (25.4 overs)

Match drawn
Boland Park, Paarl
Umpires: Thomas Mokorosi and Andre Olivier
Player of the match: Bjorn Fortuin (Lions)

- Boland won the toss and elected to bat.
- No play was possible on day 3 due to rain.
- Nqaba Peter (Lions) made his first-class debut.
- Points: Boland 12.58, Lions 13.18

20–23 March 2025
Scorecard

Warriors	v	Knights
171 (65.3 overs); Jiveshan Pillay 49 (123); Johannes van Dyk 4/48 (15.3 overs)		191 (85.4 overs); Aaron Phangiso 74 (169); Beyers Swanepoel 6/30 (21 overs)
349/5d (75 overs); Matthew De Villiers 201 (221); Tiaan van Vuuren 2/84 (18 overs)		166/4 (96.4 overs); Patrick Botha 77 (251); Christopher King 2/22 (16 overs)

Match drawn
St George's Park, Gqeberha
Umpires: Arno Jacobs and Abongile Sodumo
Player of the match: Matthew De Villiers (Warriors)

- Knights won the toss and elected to field.
- Matthew De Villiers (Warriors) scored his first century in first-class cricket.
- Points: Warriors 11.42, Knights 11.02

20–23 March 2025
Scorecard

North West	v	Dolphins
311 (111.3 overs); Ruan de Swardt 75 (170); Prenelan Subrayen 4/91 (41.3 overs)		260 (90.3 overs); Romashan Pillay 70 (140); Bamanye Xenxe 3/39 (20 overs)
186 (67.3 overs); Ruan de Swardt 49* (136); Bryce Parsons 5/28 (16.3 overs)		240/4 (57.3 overs); Jason Smith 117* (136); Odirile Modimokoane 2/65 (12.3 overs)

Dolphins won by 6 wickets
Kingsmead Cricket Ground, Durban
Umpires: Siphelele Gasa and Lubabalo Gcuma
Player of the match: Jason Smith (Dolphins)

- North West won the toss and elected to bat.
- Lutendo Tsanwani (North West) made his first-class debut.
- Points: Dolphins 22.2, North West 7.6

20–23 March 2025
Scorecard

Titans	v	Western Province
225 (68.3 overs); Lhuan-dre Pretorius 103 (157); Mihlali Mpongwana 4/24 (11.3 overs)		250 (75.3 overs); George Linde 51 (82); Junior Dala 4/53 (23 overs)
211 (54.1 overs); Dewald Brevis 99 (110); Jody Lawrence 4/39 (11 overs)		187/3 (35.5 overs); Tony de Zorzi 78* (102); Matthew Boast 2/61 (12 overs)

Western Province won by 7 wickets
Centurion Park, Centurion
Umpires: Mazizi Gampu and Stephen Harris
Player of the match: Tony de Zorzi (Western Province)

- Titans won the toss and elected to bat.
- Points: Western Province 23, Titans 6.5

=== Round 7 ===
27–30 March 2025
Scorecard

Western Province	v	Boland
592/8d (135.2 overs); Tony de Zorzi 141 (204); Shaun von Berg 6/126 (37 overs)		318 (109 overs); Clyde Fortuin 129 (214); Jody Lawrence 4/58 (16 overs)
106/2d (19 overs); Edward Moore 44* (49); Glenton Stuurman 1/21 (5 overs)		197/3 (63 overs); Grant Roelofsen 92 (186); Mihlali Mpongwana 1/21 (7 overs)

Match drawn
Newlands Cricket Ground, Cape Town
Umpires: Andre Olivier and Abdoellah Steenkamp
Player of the match: Tony de Zorzi (Western Province)

- Western Province won the toss and elected to bat.
- Points: Western Province 15.3, Boland 10.96

27–30 March 2025
Scorecard

Dolphins	v	Lions
357 (86.2 overs); Tshepang Dithole 157 (225); Codi Yusuf 4/54 (27.2 overs)		250/2 (61 overs); Joshua Richards 130* (198); Daryn Dupavillon 1/43 (13 overs)

Match drawn
Wanderers Stadium, Johannesburg
Umpires: Bongani Jele and Allahudien Paleker
Player of the match: Tshepang Dithole (Dolphins)
Joshua Richards (Lions)

- Lions won the toss and elected to field.
- No play was possible on day 2 due to rain.
- Points: Dolphins 11.14, Lions 13

27–30 March 2025
Scorecard

North West	v	Titans
345 (82.1 overs); Matthew Kleinveldt 97 (150); Junior Dala 3/55 (20.1 overs)		463/9d (108 overs); Dewald Brevis 148 (155); Hardus Viljoen 5/132 (30 overs)
189/1 (54.3 overs); Lesiba Ngoepe 84* (169); Merrick Brett 1/14 (6 overs)

Match drawn
Centurion Park, Centurion
Umpires: Dennis Smith and Brad White
Player of the match: Dewald Brevis (Titans)

- North West won the toss and elected to bat.
- Brayden Hicks and Lesego Kokohlabana (Titans) both made their first-class debuts.
- Points: North West 13.9, Titans 16.36

=== Round 8 ===
3–6 April 2025
Scorecard

Warriors	v	Dolphins
264 (94 overs); Senuran Muthusamy 106* (216); Eathan Bosch 2/31 (16 overs)		208 (45.4 overs); Prenelan Subrayen 49* (60); Christopher King 5/61 (15 overs)
325 (87.1 overs); JP King 143 (179); Tristan Luus 5/90 (25 overs)		344 (89 overs); Khaya Zondo 20 (44); Senuran Muthusamy 5/95 (35 overs)

Warriors won by 37 runs
St George's Park, Gqeberha
Umpires: Siphelele Gasa and Andre Olivier
Player of the match: Senuran Muthusamy (Warriors)

- Warriors won the toss and elected to bat.
- Tristan Luus (Dolphins) made his first-class debut. He took his first five-wicket haul in first-class cricket.
- Christopher King (Warriors) took his first five-wicket haul in first-class cricket.
- JP King (Warriors) scored his first century in first-class cricket.
- Points: Warriors 23.28, Dolphins 6.16

3–6 April 2025
Scorecard

Knights	v	Lions

Match abandoned
Mangaung Oval, Bloemfontein

- No toss.
- No play was possible on all four days due to rain and wet outfield.
- Points: Knights 5, Lions 5

3–6 April 2025
Scorecard

Boland	v	Titans
252 (84.1 overs); Pieter Malan 118 (248); Janco Smit 3/54 (18 overs)		323/6 (48.5 overs); Rivaldo Moonsamy 117 (125); Ferisco Adams 2/28 (4 overs)

Match drawn
Centurion Park, Centurion
Umpires: Dennis Smith and Warren Wyngaard

- Boland won the toss and elected to bat.
- Janco Smit (Titans) and Ethan-John Cunningham (Boland) both made their first-class debuts.
- Points: Titans 14.46, Boland 11.04

3–6 April 2025
Scorecard

North West	v	Western Province

Match abandoned
JB Marks Oval, Potchefstroom

- No toss.
- No play was possible on all four days due to rain and wet outfield.
- Points: North West 5, Western Province 5

== Division 2 Fixtures ==
=== Round 1 ===
31 October–3 November 2024
Scorecard

South Western Districts	v	Border
308 (87.4 overs); Luke Beaufort 112 (115); Jade de Klerk 5/84 (31 overs)		236 (68.4 overs); Jerome Bossr 47 (92); Thomas Kaber 4/64 (21.4 overs)
224 (67.5 overs); Tyrese Karelse 48 (63); Jade de Klerk 5/85 (24 overs)		148 (52.1 overs); Nathan Roux 28 (80); Liyabona Malife 4/12 (7.1 overs)

South Western Districts won by 148 runs
Buffalo Park, East London
Umpires: Dan van der Merwe and Bongani Ntshebe
Player of the match: Luke Beaufort (South Western Districts)

- Border won the toss and elected to field.
- Christopher Gleaves (Border) George Van Heerden and Luke Beaufort (South Western Districts) all made their first-class debuts.
- Luke Beaufort (South Western Districts) scored his first century in first-class cricket.
- Points: South Western Districts 24.16, Border 4.72

31 October–3 November 2024
Scorecard

Limpopo	v	Easterns
277 (78.3 overs); Liam Peters 103 (176); Andrew Rasemene 3/68 (14 overs)		255 (98.5 overs); Grant Thomson 63 (122); Morne Venter 3/31 (16 overs)
265 (92.4 overs); Liam Peters 45 (94); Kyle Landsberg 4/60 (21.4 overs)		199 (77.1 overs); Shaylen Pillay 56 (118); Kgaudisa Molefe 6/60 (23 overs)

Limpopo won by 88 runs
Cricket Club Ground, Polokwane
Umpires: Khawulani Ntuli and Jurie Sadler
Player of the match: Kgaudisa Molefe (Limpopo)

- Limpopo won the toss and elected to bat.
- Martin Khumalo (Easterns) made his first-class debut.
- Points: Limpopo 23.54, Easterns 7.1

7–10 November 2024
Scorecard

Easterns	v	KwaZulu-Natal Inland
361 (107.5 overs); Grant Thomson 114 (196); Ziyaad Abrahams 4/83 (25 overs)		550/5d (110.3 overs); Michael Erlank 234 (290); Tumelo Simelane 2/107 (25 overs)
170 (53.4 overs); Jason van Dyk 53 (81); Ziyaad Abrahams 6/50 (15 overs)

KwaZulu-Natal Inland won by an innings and 19 runs
Willowmoore Park, Benoni
Umpires: Roger Burne and Gladman Gaseba

- Easterns won the toss and elected to bat.
- Chad Laycock (KwaZulu-Natal Inland) made his first-class debut.
- Sean Gilson (KwaZulu-Natal Inland) scored his first century in first-class cricket.
- Points: KwaZulu-Natal Inland 26.06, Easterns 5.52

7–10 November 2024
Scorecard

Northern Cape	v	Mpumalanga
268 (102.3 overs); Cole Abrahams 129 (240); Kurtlyn Mannikam 6/80 (21 overs)		164 (49.5 overs); Karabo Mogotsi 49 (85); Benjamin Van Rensburg 3/40 (10 overs)

Match drawn
Uplands College, White River
Umpires: Jan Erasmus and Kerrin Klaaste

- Mpumalanga won the toss and elected to field.
- No play was possible on day 1 due to rain and wet outfield.
- Cole Abrahams (Mpumalanga) scored his first century on his first-class debut.
- Points: Northern Cape 13.12, Mpumalanga 10.38

=== Round 2 ===
14–17 November 2024
Scorecard

South Western Districts	v	KwaZulu-Natal Inland
93/8d (35.3 overs); Kelly Smuts 41 (80); Ziyaad Abrahams 3/9 (3 overs)		441 (98 overs); Cameron Shekleton 117 (144); Thomas Kaber 4/71 (21 overs)
475 (166.4 overs); George Van Heerden 174 (384); Michael Erlank 3/80 (33.4 overs)		128/4 (27.3 overs); Michael Erlank 46* (87); Jarred Jardine 2/31 (5 overs)

KwaZulu-Natal Inland won by 6 wickets
Recreation Ground, Oudtshoorn
Umpires: Kerrin Klaaste and Willhelm Nell

- KwaZulu-Natal Inland won the toss and elected to field.
- Thabiso Ndlela (KwaZulu-Natal Inland) made his first-class debut.
- George Van Heerden (South Western Districts) scored his first century in first-class.
- Points: KwaZulu-Natal Inland 25.82, South Western Districts 4

14–17 November 2024
Scorecard

Border	v	Northern Cape
186 (57.4 overs); Mncedisi Malika 61 (93); Hardus Viljoen 5/40 (13.4 overs)		99 (31.4 overs); Emmanuel Motswiri 39 (51); Nico van Zyl 4/31 (14 overs)
112 (41.3 overs); Chad Classen 26 (39); Ernest Kemm 8/33 (15.3 overs)		200/2 (46.1 overs); Cole Abrahams 77* (93); Thabile Hlatuka 1/12 (5 overs)

Northern Cape won by 8 wickets
De Beers Diamond Oval, Kimberley
Umpires: Mthokozisi Shezi and Jurie Sadler

- Border won the toss and elected to bat.
- Ronan Herrmann (Northern Cape) made his first-class debut.
- Points: Northern Cape 20, Border 5.72

28 November–1 December 2024
Scorecard

Northern Cape	v	KwaZulu-Natal Inland
266 (86.4 overs); Ruan Haasbroek 101 (178); Sean Whitehead 6/45 (18.4 overs)		362 (108.1 overs); Kagiso Rapulana 142 (232); Tshepo Ntuli 6/105 (29 overs)
162 (59.3 overs); Cole Abrahams 33 (51); Sean Gilson 4/40 (18 overs)		47 (15 overs); Sean Gilson 25 (43); Tshepo Ntuli 5/17 (8 overs)

Northern Cape won by 23 runs
City Oval, Pietermaritzburg
Umpires: Dennis Smith and Abdoellah Steenkamp

- Northern Cape won the toss and elected to bat.
- Christoffel Klijnhans (Northern Cape) made his first-class debut.
- Points: Northern Cape 0, KwaZulu-Natal Inland 8.84

28 November–1 December 2024
Scorecard

Border	v	Mpumalanga
343 (112.1 overs); Jason Niemand 113 (210); Jon Hinrichsen 5/55 (27.1 overs)		220 (77.5 overs); Muhammed Mayet 58 (173); Jade de Klerk 6/47 (25.5 overs)
207/3d (52 overs); Jason Niemand 79 (118); Hermann Rolfes 1/31 (8 overs)		145/3 (59 overs); Benjamin van Niekerk 57* (134); Jade de Klerk 3/32 (22 overs)

Match drawn
Uplands College, White River
Umpires: Muhammad Jooma and Brad White

- Mpumalanga won the toss and elected to field.
- No play was possible on day 1 due to a rain and wet outfield.
- Points: Border 13.96, Mpumalanga 10.3

=== Round 3 ===
5–8 December 2024
Scorecard

Limpopo	v	South Western Districts
395 (130.2 overs); Louren Steenkamp 76 (129); Thomas Kaber 5/90 (30.2 overs)		276 (123.4 overs); Kyle Jacobs 102 (301); Morne Venter 2/22 (14 overs)
223/5d (77); Liam Peters 60* (86); Thomas Kaber 2/41 (14 overs)		41/0 (13 overs); Yaseen Valli 27* (36)

Match drawn
Recreation Ground, Oudtshoorn
Umpires: Waldo Lategan and Andre Olivier

- Limpopo won the toss and elected to bat.
- Enathi Kitshini (South Western Districts) and Heinrigh Pieterse (Limpopo) both made their first-class debuts.
- Points: Limpopo 11.92, South Western Districts 9.8

5–8 December 2024
Scorecard

Border	v	Easterns
514 (134 overs); Marco Marais 170 (181); Divan Posthumus 4/17 (30 overs)		300 (113 overs); Shaylen Pillay 72 (256); Jade de Klerk 5/73 (38 overs)
140 (46.4 overs); Mathew Fourie 42 (33); Tumelo Simelane 8/55 (19.4 overs)		97 (48.4 overs); Kabelo Sekhukhune 18 (133); Nico van Zyl 4/18 (9.4 overs)

Border won by 257 runs
Buffalo Park, East London
Umpires: Gladman Gaseba and Evan van der Merwe

- Border won the toss and elected to bat.
- Butsha Mfazwe (Border) made his first-class debut.
- Points: Border 24.14, Easterns 5.44

12–15 December 2024
Scorecard

Limpopo	v	Northern Cape
207 (69.3 overs); Morne Venter 46 (93); Hardus Viljoen 3/40 (14 overs)		328 (103.3 overs); Christoffel Klijnhans 100 (117); Kgaudisa Molefe 4/105 (26 overs)
57 (20.3 overs); Liam Peters 19 (22); Ernest Kemm 4/23 (10 overs)

Northern Cape won by an innings and 64 runs
De Beers Diamond Oval, Kimberley
Umpires: Jan Erasmus and Khawulani Ntuli

- Limpopo won the toss and elected to bat.
- Christoffel Klijnhans (Northern Cape) scored his first century in first-class cricket.
- Points: Northern Cape 24.38, Limpopo 6.14

12–15 December 2024
Scorecard

Mpumalanga	v	Easterns
476 (118.2 overs); Hermann Rolfes 164 (248); Andrew Rasemene 4/94 (25.2 overs)		291 (97.1 overs); Divan Posthumus 118 (165); Hermann Rolfes 3/54 (18.1 overs)
35/1 (6.4 overs); Muhammed Mayet 13* (13); Adam Kruger 1/21 (3.4 overs)		219 (95.2 overs) (f/o); Christopher Britz 78 (223); Jon Hinrichsen 3/44 (19.2 overs)

Mpumalanga won by 9 wickets
Willowmoore Park, Benoni
Umpires: Roger Burne and Mthokozisi Shezi

- Mpumalanga won the toss and elected to bat.
- Adam Kruger (Easterns) made his first-class debut.
- Benjamin van Niekerk, Hermann Rolfes (Mpumalanga) and Divan Posthumus (Easterns) all scored their first century in first-class cricket.
- Points: Mpumalanga 25.86, Easterns 5.82

=== Round 4 ===
16–19 January 2025
Scorecard

Northern Cape	v	Easterns
311 (96.3 overs); Romano Terblanche 75 (145); Divan Posthumus 3/70 (19 overs)		146 (45.4 overs); Grant Thomson 33 (72); Tshepo Ntuli 3/29 (14.4 overs)
286 (73 overs); Ronan Herrmann 139 (214); Kyle Landsberg 5/99 (20 overs)		97 (37.4 overs); Christopher Britz 31* (110); Tshepo Ntuli 8/44 (18.4 overs)

Northern Cape won by 354 runs
De Beers Diamond Oval, Kimberley
Umpires: Jurie Sadler and Warren Wyngaard

- Northern Cape won the toss and elected to bat.
- Ronan Herrmann replaced Tian Koekemoer as a concussion substitute for Northern Cape during first innings of Northern Cape.
- Ronan Herrmann (Northern Cape) scored his first century in first-class cricket.
- Kyle Landsberg (Easterns) took his first five-wicket haul in first-class cricket.
- Points: Northern Cape 24.22, Easterns 4

16–19 January 2025
Scorecard

KwaZulu-Natal Inland	v	Limpopo
211 (77 overs); Michael Erlank 54 (158); Jan Coetzer 3/26 (12 overs)		134 (65.4 overs); Ludwig Kaestner 42 (102); Sean Whitehead 4/38 (26.4 overs)
279/7d (68.5 overs); Kagiso Rapulana 79 (119); Kgaudisa Molefe 4/88 (24 overs)		268/8 (128 overs); Sizwe Masondo 70 (232); Sean Whitehead 3/57 (44 overs)

Match drawn
Cricket Club Ground, Polokwane
Umpires: Jan Erasmus and Andre Olivier

- Limpopo won the toss and elected to field.
- Zeden Mahomed (KwaZulu-Natal) made his first-class debut.
- Points: KwaZulu-Natal Inland 12.22, Limpopo 10

16–19 January 2025
Scorecard

Mpumalanga	v	South Western Districts
226 (52.3 overs); Yassar Cook 47 (51); Jarred Jardine 3/58 (15 overs)		388 (103.2 overs); Yaseen Valli 116 (219); Gareth Dukes 5/83 (25.2 overs)
242 (80.4 overs); Yassar Cook 83 (180); Pheko Moletsane 5/23 (12 overs)		84/2 (19.3 overs); Kyle Jacobs 28 (20); Jurie Snyman 1/16 (3 overs)

South Western Districts won by 8 wickets
Uplands College, White River
Umpires: Roger Burne and Willhelm Nell

- South Western Districts won the toss and elected to field.
- Pheko Moletsane (South Western Districts) took his first five-wicket haul in first-class cricket.
- Points: South Western Districts 25.48, Mpumalanga 5.52

=== Round 5 ===
30 January–2 February 2025
Scorecard

Border	v	Limpopo
331 (95.5 overs); Mncedisi Malika 92 (143); Morne Venter 5/61 (19.5 overs)		153 (55.2 overs); Sizwe Masondo 44 (95); Chad Classen 4/35 (14 overs)
182 (62.1 overs); Jerome Bossr 60 (87); Kgaudisa Molefe 5/48 (22 overs)		211 (91.3 overs); Jan Coetzer 56 (130); Jade de Klerk 4/72 (33.3 overs)

Border won by 149 runs
Buffalo Park, East London
Umpires: Bongani Ntshebe and Evan van der Merwe

- Border won the toss and elected to bat.
- Osphesona Mbekwa (Border) made his first-class debut.
- Points: Border 24.62, Limpopo 5.06

30 January–2 February 2025
Scorecard

South Western Districts	v	Northern Cape
341 (114.1 overs); Yaseen Valli 75 (163); Ernest Kemm 4/63 (21.1 overs)		370 (138.2 overs); Ernest Kemm 90 (237); Kyle Jacobs 3/52 (20 overs)
201 (105.5 overs); George Van Heerden 47 (134); Tshepo Ntuli 3/46 (29 overs)		175/6 (29 overs); Ruan Haasbroek 44* (41); Pheko Moletsane 3/16 (4 overs)

Northern Cape won by 4 wickets
Recreation Ground, Oudtshoorn
Umpires: Willhelm Nell and Andre Olivier

- South Western Districts won the toss and elected to bat.
- Tyrese Karelse replaced Keenan Vieira as a concussion substitute for South Western Districts during second innings of South Western Districts.
- Points: Northern Cape 21.52, South Western Districts 6.16

30 January–2 February 2025
Scorecard

KwaZulu-Natal Inland	v	Mpumalanga
243 (65.5 overs); James Ritchie 59 (76); Kurtlyn Mannikam 4/70 (21.5 overs)		472/6d (131 overs); Yassar Cook 123* (216); James Ritchie 2/82 (18 overs)
146/1 (45.3 overs); Ben Compton 57* (143); Kurtlyn Mannikam 1/50 (19 overs)

Match drawn
City Oval, Pietermaritzburg
Umpires: Roger Burne and Muhammed Jooma

- KwaZulu-Natal Inland won the toss and elected to bat.
- James Ritchie (KwaZulu-Natal Inland) made his first-class debut.
- Points: Mpumalanga 15.38, KwaZulu-Natal Inland 9.86

=== Round 6 ===
20–23 March 2025
Scorecard

Border	v	KwaZulu-Natal Inland
177 (56.4 overs); Shane Dadswell 93 (126); Ziyaad Abrahams 3/46 (12 overs)		204 (76.1 overs); Kagiso Rapulana 74 (113); Jade de Klerk 7/83 (26.1 overs)
253 (80.5 overs); Shane Dadswell 75 (114); Sean Gilson 4/48 (12.5 overs)		227/4 (85.5 overs); Jack Lees 118* (227); Jade de Klerk 3/86 (35.5 overs)

KwaZulu-Natal Inland won by 6 wickets
City Oval, Pietermaritzburg
Umpires: Muhammad Jooma and Mthokozisi Shezi

- Border won the toss and elected to bat.
- Rowan Rajah (KwaZulu-Natal Inland) made his first-class debut.
- Jack Lees made his first-class debut after replacing Cameron Shekleton as a concussion substitute for KwaZulu-Natal Inland during the first innings of Border. He scored his first century in first-class cricket.
- Christopher Gleaves replaced Jerome Bossr as a concussion substitute for Border during second innings of KwaZulu-Natal Inland.
- Points: KwaZulu-Natal Inland 22.08, Border 5.54

20–23 March 2025
Scorecard

Easterns	v	South Western Districts
324/6d (97.5 overs); Christopher Britz 120 (222); Kelly Smuts 2/33 (17 overs)		4/0d (0.1 overs); Kyle Jacobs 4* (1)
Forfeit		308 (81.3 overs); George Van Heerden 101 (125); Andrew Rasemene 4/66 (16 overs)

Easterns won by 12 runs
Willowmoore Park, Benoni
Umpires: Jan Erasmus and Stacy Lackay

- Easterns won the toss and elected to bat.
- No play was possible on day 1 and day 2 due to rain and wet outfield.
- Willem Myburgh (Easterns) and Kurt Botha (South Western Districts) both made their first-class debuts.
- Points: Easterns 20.48, South Western Districts 2

20–23 March 2025
Scorecard

Limpopo	v	Mpumalanga
230 (86.2 overs); Heinrigh Pieterse 98 (178); Gareth Dukes 3/49 (17.2 overs)		365 (106.4 overs); Yassar Cook 145* (245); Jesse Albanie 5/80 (22.4 overs)
217 (72.5 overs); Morne Venter 54 (78); Kurtlyn Mannikam 6/74 (23 overs)		85/0 (10.4 overs); Jurie Snyman 43* (24)

Mpumalanga won by 10 wickets
Cricket Club Ground, Polokwane
Umpires: Waldo Lategan and Khawulani Ntuli

- Mpumalanga won the toss and elected to field.
- Points: Mpumalanga 24.78, Limpopo 4.6

== Finals ==
=== Division 1 Final ===
10–14 April 2025
Scorecard

Lions	v	Titans
413/7d (109.5 overs); Zubayr Hamza 103 (198); Janco Smit 3/84 (25 overs)		123 (47 overs); Keegan Petersen 50 (87); Codi Yusuf 4/46 (16 overs)
		371 (127.5 overs) (f/o); Lhuan-dre Pretorius 114 (209); Bjorn Fortuin 5/123 (48 overs)

Match drawn
Wanderers Stadium, Johannesburg
Umpires: Allahudien Paleker and Dennis Smith

- Lions won the toss and elected to bat.
- No play was possible on day 1 due to rain and wet outfield.

=== Division 2 Final ===
2–6 April 2025
Scorecard

Northern Cape	v	KwaZulu-Natal Inland
132/4 (54 overs); Ernest Kemm 54* (175); Mbulelo Budaza 1/18 (7 overs)

Match drawn
City Oval, Pietermaritzburg
Umpires: Mthokozisi Shezi and Phillip Vosloo

- KwaZulu-Natal Inland won the toss and elected to field.
- No play was possible on day 2, 3, 4 and 5 due to rain and wet outfield.
- Abel Mokwena (Northern Cape) made his first-class debut.
