= 2023 CSA One-Day Cup =

Cricket tournament

- Dates: 16 September – 28 October 2023
- Administrator: Cricket South Africa
- Cricket format: List A
- Tournament format: Round-robin
- Champions: Western Province (Division 1); SA Emerging (Division 2)
- Participants: 16
- Matches: 58
- Most runs: Garnett Tarr (597)
- Most wickets: Basheeru-Deen Walters (19)

The 2023-24 CSA One-Day Cup was a List A cricket competition that took place in South Africa in September and October 2023. It was the first edition of the tournament in the post-franchise era, and the first edition to return to a two-division league format. Domestic cricketing reforms were introduced in 2020 that discontinued the six franchise team format and announced a return to the more traditional provincial based system. Fifteen teams, split over the two divisions, competed in the one-day tournament.

In Division 1, five of the six teams who competed in the 2020–21 CSA Four-Day Franchise Series opted to retain their franchise brand, with only the former Cape Cobras reverting to their traditional Western Province name. They were joined in Division 1 by Boland and North West.

On 30 March 2022, in the Division One match between Titans and North West, Titans scored 453/3 from their 50 overs, setting a record for the highest total in a List A match in South Africa.

== Teams ==
The teams were placed into the following divisions:

- Division 1:

Warriors, Western Province, Titans, Lions, KwaZulu-Natal (Inland), Boland, North West, Dolphins

- Division 2:

South Western Districts, Knights, Border, Easterns, Northern Cape, Limpopo, Mpumalanga, South Africa Emerging Players

== Standing ==
=== Division 1 ===
Pos	Team	Pld	W	L	NR	Pts	NRR
1	Western Province	7	6	0	1	30	2.606
2	North West	7	4	3	0	18	0.652
3	Warriors	7	3	2	2	18	0.336
4	Lions	7	3	3	1	16	−0.028
5	Titans	7	3	4	0	13	−0.642
6	Dolphins	7	1	2	4	12	−0.465
7	Boland	7	2	4	1	8	−0.960
8	KwaZulu-Natal (Inland)	7	1	5	1	7	−1.192

Source: ESPNcricinfo

Advanced to the Finals

=== Division 2 ===
Pos	Team	Pld	W	L	NR	Pts	NRR
1	Knights	7	7	0	0	32	1.546
2	South Africa Emerging Players	7	4	2	1	21	0.939
3	Easterns	7	4	3	0	17	−0.690
4	South Western Districts	7	3	3	1	15	−0.147
5	Border	7	2	4	1	11	−0.306
6	Limpopo	7	2	4	1	10	−0.220
7	Northern Cape	7	2	5	0	9	−0.193
8	Mpumalanga	7	2	5	0	9	−0.751

Source: ESPN Cricinfo

Advanced to the Finals

== Division 1 fixtures ==
16 September 2023
13:00 (D/N)
Scorecard

Boland; 32/0 (6.3 overs)	v	Dolphins
Janneman Malan 16* (22)

No result
Kingsmead Cricket Ground, Durban
Umpires: Lubabalo Gcuma and Arno Jacobs

- Dolphins won the toss and elected to field.
- No further play was possible due to rain.
- Points: Boland 2, Dolphins 2.

16 September 2023
13:00 (D/N)
Scorecard

North West; 276/6 (50 overs)	v	Western Province; 248/4 (34.1 overs)
Raynard van Tonder 129* (145); Beuran Hendricks 3/52 (10 overs)		Kyle Verreynne 101 (65); Migael Pretorius 2/30 (6 overs)

Western Province won by 6 wickets
JB Marks Oval, Potchefstroom
Umpires: Siphelele Gasa and Stephen Harris
Player of the match: Kyle Verreynne (Western Province)

- North West won the toss and elected to bat.
- The second innings was reduced to 38 overs due to rain and West Province were set a revised target of 245.
- Meeka-eel Prince (North West) and Abdullah Bayoumy (Western Province) both made their List A debuts.
- Points: Western Province 4, North West 0.

20 September 2023
10:00
Scorecard

Lions; 89 (31.4 overs)	v	KwaZulu-Natal Inland; 90/1 (22.4 overs)
Ryan Rickelton 31 (50); Mbulelo Budaza 4/18 (6.4 overs)		Dilivio Ridgaard 29 (38); Tshepo Moreki 1/29 (6 overs)

KwaZulu-Natal Inland won by 9 wickets
City Oval, Pietermaritzburg
Umpires: Lubabalo Gcuma and Allahudien Paleker
Player of the match: Mbulelo Budaza (KwaZulu-Natal Inland)

- KwaZulu-Natal Inland won the toss and elected to field.
- Points: KwaZulu-Natal Inland 5, Lions 0.

22 September 2023
13:00 (D/N)
Scorecard

North West; 263/9 (50 overs)	v	Dolphins; 264/7 (48.5 overs)
Senuran Muthusamy 67 (76); Daryn Dupavillon 3/43 (10 overs)		Jason Smith 116* (103); Duan Jansen 2/49 (9 overs)

Dolphins won by 3 wickets
Kingsmead Cricket Ground, Durban
Umpires: Stephen Harris and Dennis Smith
Player of the match: Jason Smith (Dolphins)

- Dolphins won the toss and elected to field.
- Points: Dolphins 4, North West 0.

23 September 2023
13:00 (D/N)
Scorecard

Lions; 128 (31.2 overs)	v	Western Province; 129/0 (16.2 overs)
Wiaan Mulder 96 (93); Nandre Burger 6/38 (10 overs)		Tony de Zorzi 68* (46)

Western Province won by 10 wickets
Wanderers Stadium, Johannesburg
Umpires: Abongile Sodumo and Phillip Vosloo
Player of the match: Nandre Burger (Western Province)

- Lions won the toss and elected to bat.
- Nqaba Peter (Lions) made his List A debut.
- Nandre Burger (Western Province) took his first five-wicket haul in List A cricket.
- Points: Western Province 5, Lions 0.

23 September 2023
13:00 (D/N)
Scorecard

Titans; 380/7 (50 overs)	v	Boland; 143 (33.2 overs)
Dean Elgar 103 (99); Hardus Viljoen 2/59 (10 overs)		Christiaan Jonker 37 (35); Neil Brand 3/6 (3.2 overs)

Titans won by 237 runs
Centurion Park, Centurion
Umpires: Mazizi Gampu and Brad White
Player of the match: Dean Elgar (Titans)

- Boland won the toss and elected to field.
- Points: Titans 5, Boland -3.

25 September 2023
10:00
Scorecard

Western Province	v	Warriors

Match abandoned
Newlands Cricket Ground, Cape Town
Umpires: Lubabalo Gcuma and Phillip Vosloo

- No toss.
- No play was possible due to rain.
- Points: Western Province 2, Warriors 2.

27 September 2023
13:00 (D/N)
Scorecard

Dolphins; 200/6 (31 overs)	v	Lions
Jason Smith 65 (65); Sisanda Magala 2/32 (5 overs)

No result
Wanderers Stadium, Johannesburg
Umpires: Allahudien Paleker and Abongile Sodumo

- Lions won the toss and elected to field.
- The match was reduced to 34 overs due to rain.
- No further play was possible due to rain.
- Points: Dolphins 2, Lions 2.

30 September 2023
13:00 (D/N)
Scorecard

Warriors	v	Dolphins

Match abandoned
St George's Park, Gqeberha
Umpires: Ryan Hendricks and Abdoellah Steenkamp

- No toss.
- No play was possible due to rain.
- Points: Warriors 2, Dolphins 2.

1 October 2023
10:00
Scorecard

Boland; 323/4 (50 overs)	v	North West; 327/7 (48.3 overs)
Pieter Malan 171 (130); Migael Pretorius 2/71 (10 overs)		Meeka-eel Prince 166 (140); Hardus Viljoen 4/71 (10 overs)

North West won by 3 wickets
JB Marks Oval, Potchefstroom
Umpires: Mazizi Gampu and Brad White
Player of the match: Meeka-eel Prince (North West)

- North West won the toss and elected to field.
- Meeka-eel Prince (North West) scored his first century in List A cricket.
- Points: North West 4, Boland 0.

4 October 2023
13:00 (D/N)
Scorecard

Western Province; 381 (49 overs)	v	KwaZulu-Natal Inland; 241 (38.1 overs)
Tony de Zorzi 143 (113); Mbulelo Budaza 4/51 (10 overs)		Malcolm Nofal 70 (59); Abdullah Bayoumy 3/36 (4 overs)

Western Province won by 141 runs (DLS method)
Newlands Cricket Ground, Cape Town
Umpires: Stephen Harris and Bongani Jele
Player of the match: Tony de Zorzi (Western Province)

- KwaZulu-Natal Inland won the toss and elected to field.
- The second innings was reduced to 46 overs due to rain.
- KwaZulu-Natal Inland were set a revised target of 383 runs from 46 overs.
- Points: Western Province 5, KwaZulu-Natal Inland 0.

6 October 2023
13:00 (D/N)
Scorecard

Lions; 330/7 (50 overs)	v	Warriors; 334/6 (49.2 overs)
Dominic Hendricks 92 (79); Nealan van Heerden 2/73 (8 overs)		Patrick Kruger 135* (90); Duanne Olivier 3/40 (8 overs)

Warriors won by 4 wickets
Umpires: Ryan Hendricks and Dennis Smith
Player of the match: Patrick Kruger (Warriors)

- Lions won the toss and elected to bat.
- Points: Warriors 4, Lions 0.

8 October 2023
10:00
Scorecard

North West; 289/9 (50 overs)	v	KwaZulu-Natal Inland; 127/3 (28.2 overs)
Lesego Senokwane 109 (108); Mbulelo Budaza 3/53 (10 overs)		Kagiso Rapulana 59* (85); Wihan Lubbe 2/16 (4 overs)

North West won by 20 runs (DLS method)
City Oval, Pietermaritzburg
Umpires: Mazizi Gampu and Phillip Vosloo
Player of the match: Lesego Senokwane (North West)

- KwaZulu-Natal Inland won the toss and elected to field.
- No further play was possible due to rain.
- Points: North West 4, KwaZulu-Natal Inland 0.

8 October 2023
10:00
Scorecard

Warriors; 316/7 (50 overs)	v	Titans; 207 (40.1 overs)
Tristan Stubbs 159 (117); Dayyaan Galiem 2/59 (8 overs)		Donovan Ferreira 42 (34); Renaldo Meyer 4/31 (10 overs)

Warriors won by 109 runs
St George's Park, Gqeberha
Umpires: Thomas Mokorosi and Abdoellah Steenkamp
Player of the match: Tristan Stubbs (Warriors)

- Titans won the toss and elected to field.
- Points: Warriors 5, Titans 0.

11 October 2023
13:00 (D/N)
Scorecard

Dolphins; 270/8 (50 overs)	v	Titans; 273/4 (45 overs)
Jason Smith 75 (82); Donovan Ferreira 3/53 (10 overs)		Donovan Ferreira 138* (106); Eathan Bosch 3/56 (10 overs)

Titans won by 6 wickets
Kingsmead Cricket Ground, Durban
Umpires: Abongile Sodumo and Brad White
Player of the match: Donovan Ferreira (Titans)

- Dolphins won the toss and elected to bat.
- Points: Titans 4, Dolphins 0.

11 October 2023
13:00 (D/N)
Scorecard

Boland; 305/6 (50 overs)	v	KwaZulu-Natal Inland; 223 (46.5 overs)
Clyde Fortuin 68 (56); Michael Erlank 2/28 (7 overs)		Tian Koekemoer 84 (119); Hardus Viljoen 4/25 (8.5 overs)

Boland won by 82 runs
Boland Park, Paarl
Umpires: Mazizi Gampu and Abdoellah Steenkamp
Player of the match: Tian Koekemoer (KwaZulu-Natal Inland)

- KwaZulu-Natal Inland won the toss and elected to field.
- Points: Boland 5, KwaZulu-Natal Inland 0.

13 October 2023
13:00 (D/N)
Scorecard

Titans; 207 (37.2 overs)	v	North West; 208/2 (31 overs)
Dewald Brevis 100 (78); Kerwin Mungroo 2/33 (7 overs)		Meeka-eel Prince 89 (78); Neil Brand 2/36 (7 overs)

North West won by 8 wickets
Centurion Park, Centurion
Umpires: Lubabalo Gcuma and Bongani Jele
Player of the match: Dewald Brevis (Titans)

- Titans won the toss and elected to bat.
- Points: North West 5, Titans 0.

14 October 2023
10:00
Scorecard

Boland; 240/8 (50 overs)	v	Lions; 246/5 (45.1 overs)
Janneman Malan 70 (91 overs); Bjorn Fortuin 3/27 (10 overs)		Joshua Richards 54 (72); Shaun von Berg 2/56 (10 overs)

Lions won by 5 wickets
Boland Park, Paarl
Umpires: Stephen Harris and Thomas Mokorosi
Player of the match: Mitchell Van Buuren (Lions)

- Boland won the toss and elected to bat.
- Points: Lions 4, Boland 0.

15 October 2023
10:00
Scorecard

KwaZulu-Natal Inland; 130 (34.2 overs)	v	Warriors; 133/2 (24 overs)
Alindile Mhletywa 39 (49); Nealan van Heerden 5/37 (8 overs)		JP King 68* (64); Kyle Nipper 1/20 (3 overs)

Warriors won by 8 wickets
St George's Park, Gqeberha
Umpires: Ryan Hendricks and Dennis Smith
Player of the match: Nealan van Heerden (Warriors)

- Warriors won the toss and elected to field.
- JP King (Warriors) made his List A debut.
- Nealan van Heerden (Warriors) took his first five-wicket haul in List A cricket.
- Points: Warriors 5, KwaZulu-Natal Inland 0.

15 October 2023
10:00
Scorecard

Western Province; 302/8 (50 overs)	v	Dolphins; 257 (46.3 overs)
George Linde 55 (47); Okuhle Cele 4/55 (10 overs)		JJ Smuts 94 (101); Dane Paterson 4/38 (8.3 overs)

Western Province won by 45 runs
Kingsmead Cricket Ground, Durban
Umpires: Thomas Mokorosi and Abongile Sodumo
Player of the match: JJ Smuts (Dolphins)

- Western Province won the toss and elected to bat.
- Points: Western Province 4, Dolphins 0.

18 October 2023
13:00 (D/N)
Scorecard

Warriors; 272/8 (50 overs)	v	Boland; 273/3 (45 overs)
Sinethemba Qeshile 53 (62); Michael Copeland 2/52 (7 overs)		Pieter Malan 94 (94); JP King 1/6 (1 over)

Boland won by 7 wickets
Boland Park, Paarl
Umpires: Thomas Mokorosi and Allahudien Paleker
Player of the match: Pieter Malan (Boland)

- Warriors won the toss and elected to bat.
- Points: Boland 4, Warriors 0.

18 October 2023
13:00 (D/N)
Scorecard

Titans; 355/6 (50 overs)	v	KwaZulu-Natal Inland; 298 (47.1 overs)
Dean Elgar 119* (126); Keith Dudgeon 4/53 (10 overs)		Cameron Delport 66 (32); Donovan Ferreira 2/31 (6.1 overs)

Titans won by 57 runs
Centurion Park, Centurion
Umpires: Ryan Hendricks and Arno Jacobs
Player of the match: Dean Elgar (Titans)

- Titans won the toss and elected to bat.
- Points: Titans 4, KwaZulu-Natal Inland 0.

20 October 2023
13:00 (D/N)
Scorecard

Titans; 217 (41.3 overs)	v	Western Province; 221/8 (31 overs)
Dewald Brevis 116 (118); Mihlali Mpongwana 3/47 (9 overs)		Kyle Verreynne 56 (41); Matthew Boast 3/58 (7 overs)

Western Province won by 2 wickets
Centurion Park, Centurion
Umpires: Lauren Agenbag and Brad White
Player of the match: Dewald Brevis (Titans)

- Western Province won the toss and elected to field
- Points: Western Province 5, Titans 0.

20 October 2023
13:00 (D/N)
Scorecard

Lions; 304/7 (50 overs)	v	North West; 229 (43.2 overs)
Mitchell Van Buuren 87 (66); Caleb Seleka 3/58 (10 overs)		Raynard van Tonder 57 (64); Bjorn Fortuin 3/27 (6.2 overs)

Lions won by 75 runs
JB Marks Oval, Potchefstroom
Umpires: Siphelele Gasa and Lubabalo Gcuma
Player of the match: Mitchell Van Buuren (Lions)

- North West won the toss and elected to field.
- Points: Lions 5, North West 0.

22 October 2023
10:00
Scorecard

Boland; 255 (50 overs)	v	Western Province; 260/5 (32.5 overs)
Keegan Petersen 94 (112); Abdullah Bayoumy 4/54 (10 overs)		David Bedingham 108* (80); Hardus Viljoen 2/51 (9 overs)

Western Province won by 5 wickets
Newlands Cricket Ground, Cape Town
Umpires: Siphelele Gasa and Allahudien Paleker
Player of the match: David Bedingham (Western Province)

- Western Province won the toss and elected to field.
- Points: Western Province 5, Boland 0.

22 October 2023
10:00
Scorecard

Warriors; 94 (34.5 overs)	v	North West; 97/3 (20.4 overs)
Patrick Kruger 44 (76); Ruan de Swardt 4/17 (10 overs)		Lesego Senokwane 37 (63); JP King 2/13 (1.4 overs)

North West won by 7 wickets
St George's Park, Gqeberha
Umpires: Lauren Agenbag and Abdoellah Steenkamp
Player of the match: Ruan de Swardt (North West)

- North West won the toss and elected to field.
- Points: North West 5, Warriors 0.

22 October 2023
10:00
Scorecard

KwaZulu-Natal Inland	v	Dolphins

Match abandoned
City Oval, Pietermaritzburg
Umpires: Dennis Smith and Phillip Vosloo

- No toss.
- No play was possible due to rain.
- Points: KwaZulu-Natal Inland 2, Dolphins 2.

22 October 2023
10:00
Scorecard

Titans; 78 (22.5 overs)	v	Lions; 79/2 (11.1 overs)
Dewald Brevis 24 (46); Tshepo Moreki 3/23 (5.5 overs)		Ryan Rickelton 41* (32); Ayabulela Gqamane 1/17 (2.1 overs)

Lions won by 8 wickets
Wanderers Stadium, Johannesburg
Umpires: Arno Jacobs and Bongani Jele
Player of the match: Wiaan Mulder (Lions)

- Lions won the toss and elected to field.
- Points: Lions 5, Titans 0.

== Division 2 fixtures ==
16 September 2023
10:00
Scorecard

Knights; 312/8 (50 overs)	v	South Western Districts; 300 (49 overs)
Dian Forrester 128 (100); Hershell America 2/55 (10 overs)		Jean du Plessis 100* (94); Dian Forrester 6/48 (8 overs)

Knights won by 12 runs
Recreation Ground, Oudtshoorn
Umpires: Kerrin Klaaste and Brad White
Player of the match: Dian Forrester (Knights)

- South Western Districts won the toss and elected to field.
- Dian Forrester (Knights) scored first century and took first five-wicket haul on his List A debut.
- Points: Knights 4, South Western Districts 0.

16 September 2023
10:00
Scorecard

Easterns; 125 (29.3 overs)	v	Border; 128/5 (30.2 overs)
Shane Dadswell 40 (34); Thozama Totana 3/35(5 overs)		Nonelela Yikha 44 (67); Andrew Rasemene 2/37 (6 overs)

Border won by 5 wickets
Buffalo Park, East London
Umpires: Lauren Agenbag and Andre Olivier

- Border won the toss and elected to field.
- Thozama Totana (Border) made his List A debut.
- Points: Border 5, Easterns 0.

16 September 2023
10:00
Scorecard

Northern Cape; 230/9 (50 overs)	v	Limpopo; 201 (49.5 overs)
Grant Thomson 57 (79); Eldred Hawken 3/49 (10 overs)		Louren Steenkamp 82 (87); Grant Thomson 5/32 (7 overs)

Northern Cape won by 29 runs
De Beers Diamond Oval, Kimberley
Umpires: Roger Burne and Warren Wyngaard

- Limpopo won the toss and elected to field.
- Christoffel Klijnhans (Northern Cape), Don Radebe and Sello Seing (Limpopo) all made their List A debuts.
- Points: Northern Cape 4, Limpopo 0.

19 September 2023
09:30
Scorecard

Mpumalanga; 143 (28.3 overs)	v	South Western Districts; 144/5 (28.4 overs)
Muhammed Mayet 60* (78); Thomas Kaber 5/13 (6 overs)		Kelly Smuts 37* (24); Gareth Dukes 2/31 (6.4 overs)

South Western Districts won by 5 wickets
Uplands College, White River
Umpires: Jan Erasmus and Khawulani Ntuli

- South Western Districts won the toss and elected to field.
- Points: South Western Districts 5, Mpumalanga 0.

19 September 2023
10:00
Scorecard

Knights; 400/5 (50 overs)	v	South Africa Emerging Players; 240 (37.5 overs)
Garnett Tarr 192* (163); Romashan Pillay 2/59 (8 overs)		Ronan Herrmann 83 (82); Jacques Snyman 4/31 (6.5 overs)

Knights won by 160 runs
Mangaung Oval, Bloemfontein
Umpires: Roderick Ellis and Mthokozisi Shezi

- South Africa Emerging Players won the toss and elected to field.
- Ethan-John Cunningham, Schalk Engelbrecht, Romashan Pillay, Lhuan-dre Pretorius, Richard Seletswane, Daniel van der Merwe and Liyema Waqu (South Africa Emerging Players) all made their List A debuts.
- Garnett Tarr (Knights) scored his first century in List A cricket.
- Points: Knights 5, South Africa Emerging Players 0.

22 September 2023
10:00
Scorecard

Limpopo; 236/7 (50 overs)	v	Border; 212 (48.3 overs)
Ruan Haasbroek 55 (65); Jade de Klerk 4/29 (10 overs)		Jade de Klerk 43 (52); Kgaudisa Molefe 5/22 (10 overs)

Limpopo won by 24 runs
Buffalo Park, East London
Umpires: Gladman Gaseba and Godwin Von Willingh

- Border won the toss and elected to field.
- Kgaudisa Molefe (Limpopo) took his first five-wicket haul in List A cricket.
- Points: Limpopo 4, Border 0.

22 September 2023
10:00
Scorecard

Easterns; 249/9 (50 overs)	v	Northern Cape; 246 (49.5 overs)
Aron Visser 66 (51); Basheeru-Deen Walters 4/56 (10 overs)		Christoffel Klijnhans 75 (59); Wesley Marshall 3/33 (6.5 overs)

Easterns won by 3 runs
De Beers Diamond Oval, Kimberley
Umpires: Jan Erasmus and Warren Wyngaard

- Easterns won the toss and elected to bat.
- Points: Easterns 4, Northern Cape 0.

22 September 2023
10:00
Scorecard

South Africa Emerging Players; 288 (47.1 overs)	v	Mpumalanga; 289/7 (48.4 overs)
Andile Simelane 110 (72); Gareth Dukes 4/40 (8.1 overs)		Benjamin van Niekerk 52*; Nathan Steyn 3/53 (9 overs)

Mpumalanga won by 3 wickets
Tuks Cricket Oval, Pretoria
Umpires: Andre Olivier and Jurie Sadler

- Mpumalanga won the toss and elected to field.
- Thebe Gazide, Martin Khumalo and Nathan Steyn (South Africa Emerging Players) all made their List A debuts.
- Andile Simelane (South Africa Emerging Players) scored his first century in List A cricket.
- Points: Mpumalanga 4, South Africa Emerging Players 0.

25 September 2023
10:00
Scorecard

South Western Districts	v	Limpopo

Match abandoned
Recreation Ground, Oudtshoorn
Umpires: Gladman Gaseba and Warren Wyngaard

- No toss.
- No play was possible due to rain.
- Points: South Western Districts 2, Limpopo 2.

25 September 2023
10:00
Scorecard

South Africa Emerging Players; 362/9 (50 overs)	v	Easterns; 132 (24 overs)
Ronan Herrmann 120 (113); Thula Ngcobo 3/56 (6 overs)		Mark Pearse 50 (37); Juan James 5/20 (5 overs)

South Africa Emerging Players won by 230 runs
Willowmoore Park, Benoni
Umpires: Jurie Sadler and Godwin Von Willingh

- South Africa Emerging Players won the toss and elected to bat.
- Matthew Boast, Bennie Hansen and Juan James (South Africa Emerging Players) all made their List A debuts.
- Ronan Herrmann (South Africa Emerging Players) scored his first century in List A cricket.
- Juan James (South Africa Emerging Players) took his first five-wicket haul in List A cricket.
- Points: South Africa Emerging Players 5, Easterns 0.

27 September 2023
10:00
Scorecard

Mpumalanga; 295/8 (50 overs)	v	Knights; 296/7 (43.2 overs)
Jon Hinrichsen 61* (45); Nhlakanipho Mpungose 4/51 (10 overs)		Patrick Botha 70 (65); Gregory Mahlokwana 2/46 (7 overs)

Knights won by 3 wickets
Mangaung Oval, Bloemfontein
Umpires: Roderick Ellis and Khawulani Ntuli

- Knights won the toss and elected to field.
- Points: Knights 4, Mpumalanga 0.

28 September 2023
10:00
Scorecard

South Western Districts; 234/9 (50 overs)	v	Border; 233/8 (50 overs)
Hanno Kotze 74 (110); Jade de Klerk 3/46 (10 overs)		Marco Marais 86 (110); Marcello Piedt 2/39 (10 overs)

South Western Districts won by 1 run
Buffalo Park, East London
Umpires: Bongani Ntshebe and Mthokozisi Shezi

- Border won the toss and elected to field.
- Liyabona Malife (South Western Districts) made his List A debut.
- Points: South Western Districts 4, Border 0.

28 September 2023
10:00
Scorecard

Northern Cape; 274/5 (50 overs)	v	South Africa Emerging Players; 277/6 (49.4 overs)
Grant Thomson 90* (61); Martin Khumalo 2/33 (9 overs)		Lhuan-dre Pretorius 97 (102); Basheeru-Deen Walters 3/48 (10 overs)

South Africa Emerging Players won by 4 wickets
Tuks Cricket Oval, Pretoria
Umpires: Andre Olivier and Warren Wyngaard

- South Africa Emerging Players won the toss and elected to field.
- David Teeger and Oliver Whitehead (South Africa Emerging Players) both made their List A debuts.
- Points: South Africa Emerging Players 4, Northern Cape 0.

30 September 2023
10:00
Scorecard

Knights; 279/9 (50 overs)	v	Easterns; 223 (46.4 overs)
Jacques Snyman 109 (104); Wesley Marshall 3/51 (10 overs)		Shaylen Pillay 96* (124); Sithembile Langa 3/36 (7 overs)

Knights won by 56 runs
Willowmoore Park, Benoni
Umpires: Roger Burne and Roderick Ellis

- Easterns won the toss and elected to field.
- Points: Knights 5, Easterns 0.

30 September 2023
10:00
Scorecard

Limpopo; 296/6 (50 overs)	v	Mpumalanga; 248 (46.2 overs)
Louren Steenkamp 92 (102); Ngazibini Sigwili 3/57 (10 overs)		Alexander Kok 92 (84); Morne Venter 3/35 (6 overs)

Limpopo won by 48 runs
Cricket Club Ground, Polokwane
Umpires: Khawulani Ntuli and Jurie Sadler

- Mpumalanga won the toss and elected to field.
- Points: Limpopo 4, Mpumalanga 0.

1 October 2023
10:00
Scorecard

South Western Districts; 150 (40.2 overs)	v	South Africa Emerging Players; 153/3 (25.4 overs)
Ruan Terblanche 32 (61); Junaid Dawood 4/27 (10 overs)		Modiri Litheko 65* (69); Liyabona Malife 1/13 (2 overs)

South Africa Emerging Players won by 7 wickets
Recreation Ground, Oudtshoorn
Umpires: Andre Olivier and Warren Wyngaard

- South Africa Emerging Players won the toss and elected to field.
- Tristan Luus (South Africa Emerging Players) made his List A debut.
- Points: South Africa Emerging Players 5, South Western Districts 0.

1 October 2023
10:00
Scorecard

Border; 145 (36 overs)	v	Northern Cape; 139 (42.1 overs)
Jerome Bossr 49 (81); Tshepo Ntuli 4/27 (10 overs)		Hanu Viljoen 42 (89); Nico van Zyl 3/12 (7.1 overs)

Border won by 6 runs
De Beers Diamond Oval, Kimberley
Umpires: Jan Erasmus and Bongani Ntshebe

- Northern Cape won the toss and elected to field.
- Points: Border 4, Northern Cape 0.

4 October 2023
09:30
Scorecard

Mpumalanga; 219/9 (50 overs)	v	Northern Cape; 222/4 (39 overs)
Jon Hinrichsen 53 (29); Ernest Kemm 4/39 (10 overs)		Jason Oakes 98 (106); Alexander Kok 3/30 (5 overs)

Northern Cpe won by 6 wickets
Uplands College, White River
Umpires: Roger Burne and Jan Erasmus

- Northern Cape won the toss and elected to field.
- Akhulile Mkatu (Mpumalanga) made his List A debut.
- Points: Northern Cape 5, Mpumalanga 0.

4 October 2023
10:00
Scorecard

Easterns; 228 (40.3 overs)	v	South Western Districts; 185 (45 overs)
Shane Dadswell 72 (63); Marcello Piedt 3/27 (8.3 overs)		Mathew Christensen 56 (86); Divan Posthumus 3/24 (8 overs)

Easterns won by 43 runs
Willowmoore Park, Benoni
Umpires: Bongani Ntshebe and Mthokozisi Shezi

- South Western Districts won the toss and elected to field.
- Juandre Johnson and Thulani Tembela (Easterns) both made their List A debuts.
- Points: Easterns 4, South Western Districts 0.

6 October 2023
10:00
Scorecard

Limpopo; 252/8 (50 overs)	v	South Africa Emerging Players; 253/4 (39 overs)
Ludwig Kaestner 81 (96); Kwena Maphaka 3/60 (10 overs)		Dewan Marais 82* (53); Don Radebe 1/44 (5 overs)

South Africa Emerging Players won by 6 wickets
Tuks Cricket Oval, Pretoria
Umpires: Roger Burne and Gladman Gaseba

- South Africa Emerging Players won the toss and elected to field.
- Kwena Maphaka (South Africa Emerging Players) made his List A debut.
- Points: South Africa Emerging Players 5, Limpopo 0.

8 October 2023
10:00
Scorecard

Border; 271 (49.2 overs)	v	Knights; 274/5 (34.4 overs)
Marco Marais 53 (74); Nhlakanipho Mpungose 4/38 (7 overs)		Jacques Snyman 137 (94); Thabile Hlatuka 2/51 (5.4 overs)

Knights won by 5 wickets
Mangaung Oval, Bloemfontein
Umpires: Roderick Ellis and Marlon Jansen

- Knights won the toss and elected to field.
- Points: Knights 5, Border 0.

8 October 2023
10:00
Scorecard

Mpumalanga; 192 (38.1 overs)	v	Easterns; 196/4 (33.1 overs)
Jurie Snyman 64 (67); Divan Posthumus 3/25 (6.1 overs)		Kabelo Sekhukhune 96* (94); Ngazibini Sigwili 1/7 (5 overs)

Easterns won by 6 wickets
Willowmoore Park, Benoni
Umpires: Khawulani Ntuli and Godwin Von Willingh

- Mpumalanga won the toss and elected to bat.
- Points: Easterns 5, Mpumalanga 0.

11 October 2023
09:30
Scorecard

Border; 162 (40.2 overs)	v	Mpumalanga; 164/6 (31 overs)
Jade de Klerk 42 (45); Jurie Snyman 4/34 (10 overs)		Jurie Snyman 51 (39); Phaphama Fojela 3/57 (9 overs)

Mpumalanga won by 4 wickets
Uplands College, White River
Umpires: Gladman Gaseba and Godwin Von Willingh

- Mpumalanga won the toss and elected to field.
- Points: Mpumalanga 5, Border 0.

11 October 2023
10:00
Scorecard

Knights; 257/9 (50 overs)	v	Limpopo; 227 (46.1 overs)
Patrick Botha 63 (72); Don Radebe 5/50 (10 overs)		Louren Steenkamp 99 (111); Sithembile Langa 3/34 (7 overs)

Knights won by 30 runs
Cricket Club Ground, Polokwane
Umpires: Bongani Ntshebe and Mthokozisi Shezi

- Limpopo won the toss and elected to field.
- Maphekgola Pootona (Limpopo) made his List A debut.
- Nathan Roux replaced Jacques Snyman as a concussion substitute for Knights during first innings.
- Points: Knights 4, Limpopo 0.

12 October 2023
10:00
Scorecard

South Western Districts; 344/9 (50 overs)	v	Northern Cape; 314/9 (50 overs)
Blayde Capell 127 (117); Johannes van Dyk 3/50 (10 overs)		Jason Oakes 99 (95); Liyabona Malife 3/52 (10 overs)

South Western Districts won by 30 runs
Recreation Ground, Oudtshoorn
Umpires: Jurie Sadler and Warren Wyngaard

- South Western Districts won the toss and elected to bat.
- Points: South Western Districts 4, Northern Cape 0.

14 October 2023
10:00
Scorecard

Easterns; 246/8 (50 overs)	v	Limpopo; 223 (44.2 overs)
Juandre Johnson 47 (43); Morne Venter 3/49 (10 overs)		Morne Venter 97 (130); Divan Posthumus 3/31 (7.2 overs)

Easterns won by 23 runs
Cricket Club Ground, Polokwane
Umpires: Andre Olivier and Mthokozisi Shezi

- Limpopo won the toss and elected to field.
- Points: Easterns 4, Limpopo 0.

15 October 2023
10:00
Scorecard

Border	v	South Africa Emerging Players

Match abandoned
Buffalo Park, East London
Umpires: Bongani Ntshebe and Khawulani Ntuli

- No toss.
- No play was possible due to rain.
- Points: Border 2, South Africa Emerging Players 2.

15 October 2023
10:00
Scorecard

Knights; 299 (49.2 overs)	v	Northern Cape; 137/7 (32.3 overs)
Garnett Tarr 152 (149); Ernest Kemm 3/45 (10 overs)		Christopher Britz 42 (60); Aubrey Swanepoel 2/12 (4 overs)

Knights won by 106 runs (DLS method)
Mangaung Oval, Bloemfontein
Umpires: Jan Erasmus and Jurie Sadler

- Northern Cape won the toss and elected to field.
- No further play was possible due to rain.
- Seth Fledermaus (Knights) made his List A debut.
- Points: Knights 5, Northern Cape 0.

== Finals ==
Division One
28 October 2023
Scorecard

Western Province; 307/8 (50 overs)	v	North West; 200 (40.4 overs)
Kyle Verreynne 111 (103); Kerwin Mungroo 3/66 (10 overs)		Wihan Lubbe 70 (79); Mihlali Mpongwana 3/32 (6 overs)

Western Province won by 107 runs
Newlands, Cape Town
Umpires: Lubabalo Gcuma and Stephen Harris
Player of the match: Mihlali Mpongwana (Western Province)

- North West won the toss elected to field.

Division Two
20 October 2023
Scorecard

Knights; 276 (46.2 overs)	v	South Africa Emerging Players; 278/2 (32.3 overs)
Garnett Tarr 105 (115); Junaid Dawood 4/60 (10 overs)		David Teeger 95 (70); Aubrey Swanepoel 1/46 (7) overs

SA Emerging won by 8 wickets
Mangaung Oval, Bloemfontein
Umpires: Andre Olivier and Warren Wyngaard

- South Africa Emerging Players won the toss and elected to field.
