= 2021 CSA Provincial T20 Cup =

Cricket tournament

- Dates: 24 September – 22 October 2021
- Administrator: Cricket South Africa
- Cricket format: Twenty20
- Tournament format(s): Round-robin and Final
- Host: South Africa
- Champions: Knights (1st title)
- Runners-up: Dolphins
- Participants: 16
- Matches: 31
- Most runs: Rilee Rossouw (295)
- Most wickets: Ottniel Baartman (11); Daryn Dupavillon (11); Migael Pretorius (11)

The 2021–22 CSA Provincial T20 Knock-Out was a Twenty20 cricket tournament that was played in South Africa in September and October 2021. It was the first Twenty20 tournament to be played in the country since Cricket South Africa restructured its domestic setup, and featured all fifteen provincial sides and the national under-19 team.

From Pool A, South Western Districts and Western Province both advanced to the play-offs. In Group B, Knights and Titans finished first and second respectively to qualify. Group D saw Boland and Warriors reach the play-offs. The final group matches were played in Group C, with Dolphins and North West completing the line-up for the play-off stage.

On the first day of the quarter-finals, Titans beat South Western Districts by 54 runs, and Knights beat Western Province by four runs. In the first semi-final, Dolphins beat Titans by four wickets. The second semi-final finished as no result due to rain, with Knights advancing to the final due to have a better run rate throughout the tournament. In the final, Knights beat Dolphins by seven runs to win their first domestic title in ten years.

== Teams ==
The teams were placed into the following groups:

- Pool A: Lions, Northern Cape, South Western Districts, Western Province
- Pool B: Knights, KwaZulu-Natal Inland, Mpumalanga, Titans
- Pool C: Dolphins, Easterns, North West, South Africa Under-19s
- Pool D: Boland, Border, Limpopo, Warriors

== Fixtures ==
=== Pool A ===
24 September 2021
Scorecard

Western Province; 197/7 (20 overs)	v	Lions; 195/6 (20 overs)
Zubayr Hamza 106 (63); Malusi Siboto 4/29 (4 overs)		Ryan Rickelton 53 (31); Mihlali Mpongwana 2/27 (2 overs)

Western Province won by 2 runs
Diamond Oval, Kimberley
Umpires: Allahudien Paleker and Marais Erasmus
Player of the match: Malusi Siboto (Lions)

- Lions won the toss and elected to field.
- Jordan Woolf (Western Province) made his T20 debut.
- Zubayr Hamza (Western Province) scored his first century in T20 cricket.

24 September 2021
Scorecard

South Western Districts; 192/4 (20 overs)	v	Northern Cape; 168/9 (20 overs)
Jean du Plessis 69 (39); Johan van Dyk 2/34 (4 overs)		Jonathan Vandiar 36 (21); Hershell America 3/23 (4 overs)

South Western Districts won by 24 runs
Diamond Oval, Kimberley
Umpires: Arno Jacobs and Thomas Mokorosi
Player of the match: Jean du Plessis (South Western Districts)

- Northern Cape won the toss and elected to field.
- Hershell America, Pheko Moletsane, Renaldo Meyer, Sintu Majeza (South Western Districts) and Jerome Xaba (Northern Cape) all made their T20 debuts.

25 September 2021
Scorecard

Western Province; 130/7 (20 overs)	v	South Western Districts; 134/7 (19.4 overs)
Kyle Simmonds 46* (32); Hershell America 3/22 (4 overs)		Yaseen Valli 55* (54); Nandre Burger 2/21 (4 overs)

South Western Districts won by 3 wickets
Diamond Oval, Kimberley
Umpires: Gladman Gaseba and Marais Erasmus
Player of the match: Yaseen Valli (South Western Districts)

- Western Province won the toss and elected to bat.

25 September 2021
Scorecard

Northern Cape; 157/7 (20 overs)	v	Lions; 157/9 (20 overs)
Ernest Kemm 83* (55); Ruan Haasbroek 4/28 (4 overs)		Mitchell Van Buuren 61 (31); Johan van Dyk 3/16 (4 overs)

Match tied
(Lions won the Super Over)
Diamond Oval, Kimberley
Umpires: Allahudien Paleker and Jurie Sadler
Player of the match: Ruan Haasbroek (Lions)

- Northern Cape won the toss and elected to bat.

26 September 2021
Scorecard

South Western Districts; 129/6 (20 overs)	v	Lions; 132/6 (19.5 overs)
Jean du Plessis 41 (38); Lutho Sipamla 2/23 (4 overs)		Ruan Haasbroek 44* (38); Heath Richards 1/15 (1.5 overs)

Lions won by 4 wickets
Diamond Oval, Kimberley
Umpires: Arno Jacobs and Gladman Gaseba
Player of the match: Ruan Haasbroek (Lions)

- Lions won the toss and elected to field.
- Jhedli van Briesies (South Western Districts) made his T20 debut.

26 September 2021
Scorecard

Northern Cape; 163/8 (20 overs)	v	Western Province; 164/4 (18.2 overs)
Evan Jones 50 (35); Wayne Parnell 3/30 (4 overs)		Zubayr Hamza 62 (50); Andrew Rasemene 2/26 (3 overs)

Western Province won by 6 wickets
Diamond Oval, Kimberley
Umpires: Jurie Sadler and Thomas Mokorosi
Player of the match: Wayne Parnell (Western Province)

- Western Province won the toss and elected to field.
- Hanu Viljoen, Orapeleng Motlhoaring (Northern Cape), Daniel Smith and Yves Kamanzi (Western Province) all made their T20 debuts.

=== Pool B ===
28 September 2021
Scorecard

Titans; 143/8 (20 overs)	v	Knights; 147/4 (19.1 overs)
Dean Elgar 41 (38); Migael Pretorius 3/21 (4 overs)		Rilee Rossouw 73* (51); Aaron Phangiso 1/23 (4 overs)

Knights won by 6 wickets
Mangaung Oval, Bloemfontein
Umpires: Bongani Jele and Lubabalo Gcuma
Player of the match: Rilee Rossouw (Knights)

- Knights won the toss and elected to field.

28 September 2021
Scorecard

Mpumalanga; 112/8 (20 overs)	v	KwaZulu-Natal Inland; 113/3 (13 overs)
Rubin Hermann 32 (31); Gareth Dukes 2/18 (3 overs)		Cameron Delport 72* (39); Blake Schraader 2/21 (4 overs)

KwaZulu-Natal Inland won by 7 wickets
Mangaung Oval, Bloemfontein
Umpires: Abdoellah Steenkamp and Brad White
Player of the match: Kyle Nipper (KwaZulu-Natal Inland)

- Mpumalanga won the toss and elected to bat.
- Akhulile Mkatu and Jarred Alder (Mpumalanga) both made their T20 debuts.

29 September 2021
Scorecard

Knights; 154/5 (20 overs)	v	KwaZulu-Natal Inland; 120 (19.5 overs)
Rilee Rossouw 67 (47); Thula Ngcobo 2/26 (4 overs)		Kyle Nipper 23 (22); Migael Pretorius 3/32 (4 overs)

Knights won by 34 runs
Mangaung Oval, Bloemfontein
Umpires: Abdoellah Steenkamp and Philip Vosloo
Player of the match: Rilee Rossouw (Knights)

- KwaZulu-Natal Inland won the toss and elected to field.

29 September 2021
Scorecard

Titans; 66/4 (7 overs)	v	Mpumalanga; 60/6 (7 overs)
Donavon Ferreira 19* (7); Blake Schraader 1/9 (1 over)		Rubin Hermann 19 (9); Okuhle Cele 2/7 (2 overs)

Titans won by 9 runs (DLS method)
Mangaung Oval, Bloemfontein
Umpires: Jan Erasmus and Lubabalo Gcuma
Player of the match: Okuhle Cele (Titans)

- Mpumalanga won the toss and elected to field.
- Mpumalanga were set a revised target of 70 runs from 7 overs due to rain.

30 September 2021
Scorecard

Titans; 157/7 (20 overs)	v	KwaZulu-Natal Inland; 133/7 (20 overs)
Donavon Ferreira 43* (24); Kurtlyn Mannikam 2/17 (3 overs)		Luke Schlemmer 33 (26); Okuhle Cele 2/24 (4 overs)

Titans won by 24 runs
Mangaung Oval, Bloemfontein
Umpires: Brad White and Jan Erasmus
Player of the match: Okuhle Cele (Titans)

- Titans won the toss and elected to bat.
- Jandré Pretorius (Titans) made his T20 debut.

30 September 2021
Scorecard

Mpumalanga	v	Knights

Match abandoned
Mangaung Oval, Bloemfontein
Umpires: Bongani Jele and Philip Vosloo

- No toss.
- No play was possible due to rain.

=== Pool C ===
8 October 2021
Scorecard

North West; 128/8 (20 overs)	v	Dolphins; 131/2 (15.1 overs)
Eben Botha 41 (17); Ottniel Baartman 4/20 (4 overs)		Sarel Erwee 68 (50); Senuran Muthusamy 1/26 (3.1 overs)

Dolphins won by 8 wickets
Mangaung Oval, Bloemfontein
Umpires: Mazizi Gampu and Shaun George
Player of the match: Sarel Erwee (Dolphins)

- Dolphins won the toss and elected to field.
- Caleb Seleka, Eben Botha and Heinrigh Pieterse (North West) all made their T20 debuts.

8 October 2021
Scorecard

South Africa Under-19s; 172/8 (20 overs)	v	Easterns; 175/2 (18 overs)
Dewald Brevis 46 (25); Tumelo Tlhokwe 3/18 (4 overs)		Danie Rossouw 66* (48); Asakhe Tsaka 1/22 (3 overs)

Easterns won by 8 wickets
Mangaung Oval, Bloemfontein
Umpires: Arno Jacobs and Siphelele Gasa
Player of the match: Tumelo Tlhokwe (Easterns)

- South Africa Under-19s won the toss and elected to bat.
- Andile Simelane, Asakhe Tsaka, Dewald Brevis, Ethan-John Cunningham, George Van Heerden, Jade Smith, Joshua Stephenson, Kaden Solomon, Liam Alder, Mickey Copeland, Valintine Kitime (South Africa Under-19s), and Danie Rossouw (Easterns) all made their T20 debuts.

9 October 2021
Scorecard

North West; 142/4 (20 overs)	v	South Africa Under-19s; 99 (17.2 overs)
Shaylen Pillay 60* (49); Joshua Stephenson 2/23 (3 overs)		Valintine Kitime 29 (23); Senuran Muthusamy 3/16 (4 overs)

North West won by 43 runs
Mangaung Oval, Bloemfontein
Umpires: Bongani Ntshebe and Murray Brown
Player of the match: Shaylen Pillay (North West)

- South Africa Under-19s won the toss and elected to field.
- Aphiwe Mnyanda (South Africa Under-19s) made his T20 debut.

9 October 2021
Scorecard

Dolphins; 155/6 (20 overs)	v	Easterns; 147/8 (20 overs)
Jason Smith 45* (34); Jurie Snyman 2/26 (4 overs)		Danie Rossouw 53 (50); Daryn Dupavillon 3/11 (4 overs)

Dolphins won by 8 runs
Mangaung Oval, Bloemfontein
Umpires: Shaun George and Siphelele Gasa
Player of the match: Jason Smith (Dolphins)

- Easterns won the toss and elected to field.
- Sinenhlanhla Zwane (Easterns) made his T20 debut.

10 October 2021
Scorecard

South Africa Under-19s; 114 (20 overs)	v	Dolphins; 115/0 (13 overs)
George Van Heerden 35 (33); Odirile Modimokoane 2/12 (4 overs)		Grant Roelofsen 77* (42)

Dolphins won by 10 wickets
Mangaung Oval, Bloemfontein
Umpires: Arno Jacobs and Bongani Ntshebe
Player of the match: Grant Roelofsen (Dolphins)

- Dolphins won the toss and elected to field.
- GJ Maree, Jan Coetzer, Jesse Prodehl (South Africa Under-19s), and Odirile Modimokoane (Dolphins) all made their T20 debuts.

10 October 2021
Scorecard

North West; 158/7 (20 overs)	v	Easterns; 157/6 (20 overs)
Wesley Marshall 73 (47); Jurie Snyman 3/16 (4 overs)		Jurie Snyman 33 (21); Duan Jansen 3/27 (4 overs)

North West won by 1 run
Mangaung Oval, Bloemfontein
Umpires: Mazizi Gampu and Murray Brown
Player of the match: Senuran Muthusamy (North West)

- Easterns won the toss and elected to field.

=== Pool D ===
4 October 2021
Scorecard

Boland; 183/5 (20 overs)	v	Warriors; 166/7 (20 overs)
Clyde Fortuin 104* (63); Mthiwekhaya Nabe 3/49 (4 overs)		Matthew Breetzke 51 (37); Ziyaad Abrahams 3/27 (4 overs)

Boland won by 17 runs
Diamond Oval, Kimberley
Umpires: Abongile Sodumo and Stephen Harris
Player of the match: Ferisco Adams (Boland)

- Warriors won the toss and elected to field.
- Khanya Dilima (Boland) and Kyle Jacobs (Warriors) both made their T20 debuts.
- Clyde Fortuin (Boland) scored his first century in T20 cricket.

4 October 2021
Scorecard

Limpopo; 138/5 (20 overs)	v	Border; 139/2 (14.3 overs)
Morne Venter 56* (40); Gideon Peters 2/17 (4 overs)		Marco Marais 65 (35); Morne Venter 2/7 (2.3 overs)

Border won by 8 wickets
Diamond Oval, Kimberley
Umpires: Dennis Smith and Ryan Hendricks
Player of the match: Marco Marais (Border)

- Limpopo won the toss and elected to bat.
- Juandre Scheepers, Nyiko Shikwambana, Morne Venter (Limpopo), and Nqabayomzi Peter (Border) all made their T20 debuts.

5 October 2021
Scorecard

Warriors; 243/6 (20 overs)	v	Limpopo; 123/9 (20 overs)
Wihan Lubbe 65 (33); Malcolm Nofal 2/34 (4 overs)		Malcolm Nofal 38 (23); Kyle Jacobs 2/14 (4 overs)

Warriors won by 120 runs
Diamond Oval, Kimberley
Umpires: Godwin Von Willingh and Ryan Hendricks
Player of the match: Wihan Lubbe (Warriors)

- Limpopo won the toss and elected to field.
- Khaif Patel (Limpopo) made his T20 debut.

5 October 2021
Scorecard

Boland; 172/6 (20 overs)	v	Border; 154/5 (20 overs)
Christiaan Jonker 56* (39); Clayton Bosch 3/37 (4 overs)		Jerry Nqolo 50 (38); Ziyaad Abrahams 2/34 (4 overs)

Boland won by 18 runs
Diamond Oval, Kimberley
Umpires: Marlon Jansen and Stephen Harris
Player of the match: Christiaan Jonker (Boland)

- Border won the toss and elected to field.
- Jerome Bossr (Border) made his T20 debut.

6 October 2021
Scorecard

Boland; 141/8 (20 overs)	v	Limpopo; 109/8 (20 overs)
Clyde Fortuin 47 (34); Don Radebe 3/31 (4 overs)		Ludwig Kaestner 43 (43); Shaun von Berg 3/17 (4 overs)

Boland won by 32 runs
Diamond Oval, Kimberley
Umpires: Dennis Smith and Godwin Von Willingh
Player of the match: Shaun von Berg (Boland)

- Boland won the toss and elected to bat.
- Hlomla Hanabe, Ruan Terblanche (Boland), Amir Sohil Bux and Atwell Mokgoloboto (Limpopo) all made their T20 debuts.

6 October 2021
Scorecard

Warriors; 228/5 (20 overs)	v	Border; 207/5 (20 overs)
Matthew Breetzke 80 (46); Thomas Kaber 2/30 (4 overs)		Clayton Bosch 64* (28); JJ Smuts 2/48 (4 overs)

Warriors won by 21 runs
Diamond Oval, Kimberley
Umpires: Abongile Sodumo and Marlon Jansen
Player of the match: Thomas Kaber (Border)

- Warriors won the toss and elected to bat.

== Play-offs ==
=== Bracket ===
Quarter-finals
A1	South Western Districts	138
B2	Titans	192/5
C1	Dolphins	131/4
D2	Warriors	127/9
B1	Knights	223/3
A2	Western Province	219/7
D1	Boland	153/6
C2	North West	156/8

Semi-finals
QF1	Titans	138
QF3	Dolphins	139/6
QF2	Knights	127/7
QF4	North West	42/0

Final
SF1	Dolphins	169/6
SF2	Knights	176/5

=== Quarter-finals ===
1st Quarter-final
19 October 2021
Scorecard

Titans; 192/5 (20 overs)	v	South Western Districts; 138 (17.1 overs)
Donavon Ferreira 55* (29); Hershell America 3/34 (4 overs)		Leus du Plooy 55 (33); Aaron Phangiso 2/18 (3 overs)

Titans won by 54 runs
Diamond Oval, Kimberley
Umpires: Bongani Jele and Shaun George
Player of the match: Aaron Phangiso (Titans)

- South Western Districts won the toss and elected to field.

2nd Quarter-final
19 October 2021
Scorecard

Knights; 223/3 (20 overs)	v	Western Province; 219/7 (20 overs)
Rilee Rossouw 112* (55); Aviwe Mgijima 1/20 (2 overs)		Wayne Parnell 80* (29); Alfred Mothoa 2/35 (4 overs)

Knights won by 4 runs
Diamond Oval, Kimberley
Umpires: Lubabalo Gcuma and Stephen Harris
Player of the match: Rilee Rossouw (Knights)

- Knights won the toss and elected to bat.

3rd Quarter-final
20 October 2021
Scorecard

Warriors; 127/9 (20 overs)	v	Dolphins; 131/4 (19.2 overs)
Diego Rosier 51 (41); Daryn Dupavillon 4/18 (4 overs)		Jason Smith 60* (41); Glenton Stuurman 2/18 (4 overs)

Dolphins won by 6 wickets
Diamond Oval, Kimberley
Umpires: Arno Jacobs and Bongani Jele
Player of the match: Jason Smith (Dolphins)

- Warriors won the toss and elected to bat.

4th Quarter-final
20 October 2021
Scorecard

North West; 156/8 (20 overs)	v	Boland; 153/6 (20 overs)
Eben Botha 41 (34); Ferisco Adams 2/26 (3 overs)		Janneman Malan 74* (56); Duan Jansen 2/19 (4 overs)

North West won by 3 runs
Diamond Oval, Kimberley
Umpires: Brad White and Shaun George
Player of the match: Duan Jansen (North West)

- North West won the toss and elected to bat.

=== Semi-finals ===
1st Semi-final
21 October 2021
Scorecard

Titans; 138 (19.4 overs)	v	Dolphins; 139/6 (19.3 overs)
Gihahn Cloete 62 (49); Ottniel Baartman 4/18 (4 overs)		Khaya Zondo 58* (45); Corbin Bosch 2/18 (4 overs)

Dolphins won by 4 wickets
Diamond Oval, Kimberley
Umpires: Brad White and Stephen Harris

- Titans won the toss and elected to bat.

2nd Semi-final
21 October 2021
Scorecard

Knights; 127/7 (20 overs)	v	North West; 42/0 (2.3 overs)
Gerald Coetzee 29* (12); Eldred Hawken 3/37 (4 overs)		Eben Botha 21* (8)

No result
Diamond Oval, Kimberley
Umpires: Arno Jacobs and Lubabalo Gcuma

- Knights won the toss and elected to bat.
- No further play was possible due to rain.

=== Final ===
Final
22 October 2021
Scorecard

Knights; 176/5 (20 overs)	v	Dolphins; 169/6 (20 overs)
Patrick Kruger 61 (53); Daryn Dupavillon 2/24 (4 overs)		Khaya Zondo 43 (28); Migael Pretorius 3/30 (4 overs)

Knights won by 7 runs
Diamond Oval, Kimberley
Umpires: Bongani Jele and Stephen Harris

- Dolphins won the toss and elected to field.
