= Lategan =

Lategan is a surname. Notable people with the surname include:

- Barry Lategan (1935–2024), South Africa-born British fashion and portrait photographer
- Henk Lategan (born 1994), South African off-road racing driver
- Liske Lategan (born 1998), South African rugby sevens player
- Tjol Lategan (1925–2015), South African rugby union player
- Waldo Lategan (born 1989), South African cricketer
