= Jody Lawrence (cricketer) =

South African cricketer (born 1990)

Personal information
- Full name: Jody Terence Lawrence
- Born: 26 May 1990 (age 35); Cape Town, South Africa
- Batting: Right-handed
- Bowling: Right arm fast

Domestic team information
- Years: Team
- Durbanville Cricket Club
- 2024-present: Western Province
- Source: Cricinfo, 6 December 2024

Jody Terence Lawrence (born 26 May 1990) is a South African cricketer. He plays for Durbanville Cricket Club.

== Career ==
He made his first-class debut for Western Province against the Lions during the 2024–25 CSA 4-Day Series on 21 November 2024 at the Wanderers Stadium, Johannesburg.
