= Luke Beaufort =

South African cricketer (born 2001)

Personal information
- Born: 14 April 2001 (age 25)
- Source: Cricinfo, 22 March 2021

Luke Beaufort (born 14 April 2001) is a South African cricketer. He made his List A debut on 21 March 2021, for Eastern Province in the 2020–21 CSA Provincial One-Day Challenge. Prior to his List A debut, he was named in South Africa's squad for the 2020 Under-19 Cricket World Cup.
