= Pheko Moletsane =

South African cricketer (born 2001)

Personal information
- Born: 9 July 2001 (age 25)
- Source: Cricinfo, 2 March 2019

Pheko Moletsane (born 9 July 2001) is a South African cricketer. He made his first-class debut for Free State in the 2018–19 CSA 3-Day Provincial Cup on 28 February 2019. He made his List A debut for Free State in the 2018–19 CSA Provincial One-Day Challenge on 3 March 2019. In December 2019, he was named in South Africa's squad for the 2020 Under-19 Cricket World Cup. He made his Twenty20 debut on 24 September 2021, for South Western Districts in the 2021–22 CSA Provincial T20 Knock-Out tournament.
