= Heinrigh Pieterse =

South African cricketer (born 2002)

Personal information
- Born: 11 January 2002 (age 24)
- Batting: Left-handed
- Bowling: Right-arm medium

Domestic team information
- Years: Team
- 2021/22: North West
- Source: Cricinfo, 8 October 2021

Heinrigh Pieterse (born 11 January 2002) is a South African cricketer. He made his Twenty20 debut on 8 October 2021, for North West in the 2021–22 CSA Provincial T20 Knock-Out tournament. Prior to his Twenty20 debut, Pieterse had also played for the South Africa under-19 team, in a home series against Pakistan in July 2019.
