= George Van Heerden =

South African cricketer (born 2003)

Personal information
- Born: 11 September 2003 (age 23)
- Batting: Right-handed
- Bowling: Right-arm medium

Domestic team information
- Years: Team
- 2024–present: South Western Districts

Career statistics
Competition	FC	LA	T20
Matches	6	7	13
Runs scored	515	258	381
Batting average	64.37	64.50	34.63
100s/50s	2/2	1/1	0/3
Top score	174	110*	75*
Catches/stumpings	2/–	2/–	5/–
- Source: Cricinfo, 1 May 2025

George Van Heerden (born 11 September 2003) is a South African cricketer. In October 2021, he was named as the captain of the South Africa Under-19s for the 2021–22 CSA Provincial T20 Knock-Out tournament. He made his Twenty20 debut on 8 October 2021, for the under-19 team in the T20 Knock-Out tournament. In November 2021, he was named as the captain of South Africa's team for the 2022 ICC Under-19 Cricket World Cup in the West Indies.
