= Beyers Swanepoel =

South African cricketer (born 1998)

Personal information
- Born: 6 May 1998 (age 28); Vanderbijlpark, Gauteng, South Africa
- Batting: Left-handed
- Bowling: Right-arm medium-fast
- Role: All-rounder

Domestic team information
- Years: Team
- 2016/17–2018/19: Free State
- 2019/20–2021/22: Northern Cape
- 2019/20: Knights
- 2022/23–2024/25: Warriors
- 2023/24: Sunrisers Eastern Cape
- 2024: Kent
- 2025/26: Lions
- 2026: Worcestershire
- 2026/27–present: Titans

Career statistics
Competition	FC	LA	T20
Matches	57	61	50
Runs scored	1,760	749	431
Batting average	25.50	23.40	16.57
100s/50s	1/9	0/4	0/1
Top score	188*	73*	83
Balls bowled	8,782	2,806	1,036
Wickets	224	92	57
Bowling average	20.53	22.40	26.19
5 wickets in innings	12	0	1
10 wickets in match	2	0	0
Best bowling	7/50	4/9	5/39
Catches/stumpings	27/–	27/–	17/–
- Source: CricInfo, 13 September 2026

Beyers Swanepoel (born 6 May 1998) is a South African cricketer. He made his first-class debut for Free State in the 2016–17 Sunfoil 3-Day Cup on 9 March 2017. He made his List A debut for Free State in the 2017–18 CSA Provincial One-Day Challenge on 15 October 2017. He was the leading wicket-taker in the 2018 University Sports South Africa tournament while playing for the University of the Free State. His performance during the tournament saw him included in the tournament's team that will participate in the Future Cup in April 2019.

In September 2019, he was named in Northern Cape's squad for the 2019–20 CSA Provincial T20 Cup. He made his Twenty20 debut for Northern Cape in the 2019–20 CSA Provincial T20 Cup on 13 September 2019. In April 2021, he was named in Northern Cape's squad, ahead of the 2021–22 cricket season in South Africa.

Swanepoel played as an overseas player for Kent in the 2024 English county season. In December 2025, he signed a contract with Worcestershire to represent the club in red-ball cricket in 2026.
