= Tiaan van Vuuren =

South African cricketer (born 2001)

Personal information
- Full name: Tiaan Michael van Vuuren
- Born: 31 July 2001 (age 25); Port Elizabeth, Eastern Cape, South Africa
- Batting: Right-handed
- Bowling: Right-arm medium fast
- Role: Batting all-rounder

Domestic team information
- Years: Team
- 2018/19–2022/23: Eastern Province
- 2023/24–present: Knights
- 2024–2025: Pretoria Capitals
- 2025/26–present: MI Cape Town
- 2026: Surrey

Career statistics
Competition	FC	LA	T20
Matches	28	26	27
Runs scored	752	357	197
Batting average	24.25	23.80	16.41
100s/50s	1/0	0/1	0/0
Top score	120	54	42*
Balls bowled	3,776	1,113	509
Wickets	83	38	11
Bowling average	26.07	25.57	67.00
5 wickets in innings	3	0	0
10 wickets in match	1	0	0
Best bowling	6/52	4/39	2/33
Catches/stumpings	9/–	9/–	9/–
- Source: Cricinfo, 21 July 2026

Tiaan Michael van Vuuren (born 31 July 2001) is a South African cricketer. He made his first-class debut for Eastern Province in the 2018–19 CSA 3-Day Provincial Cup on 21 March 2019. He made his List A debut for Eastern Province in the 2018–19 CSA Provincial One-Day Challenge on 31 March 2019. In September 2019, he was named in Eastern Province's squad for the 2019–20 CSA Provincial T20 Cup. He made his Twenty20 debut for Eastern Province in the 2019–20 CSA Provincial T20 Cup on 13 September 2019. In December 2019, he was named in South Africa's squad for the 2020 Under-19 Cricket World Cup.
