= Jade de Klerk =

South African cricketer

Personal information
- Full name: Jade de Klerk
- Born: 24 February 1999 (age 27)
- Batting: Right-handed
- Bowling: Slow left-arm orthodox
- Role: Bowler

Career statistics
Competition	First-class	List A	T20
Matches	41	39	41
Runs scored	1277	527	156
Batting average	26.06	26.35	9.17
100s/50s	0/9	0/2	0/0
Top score	78	52	35*
Balls bowled	7036	1837	761
Wickets	131	56	31
Bowling average	28.38	25.00	30.51
5 wickets in innings	9	0	0
10 wickets in match	3	0	0
Best bowling	7/46	4/27	4/12
Catches/stumpings	20/–	12/–	11/–
- Source: ESPNCricinfo, 1 June 2026

Jade de Klerk (born 24 February 1999) is a South African cricketer. He made his Twenty20 debut for Eastern Province in the 2017 Africa T20 Cup on 2 September 2017.

In December 2017, he was named in South Africa's squad for the 2018 Under-19 Cricket World Cup. He made his first-class debut for Eastern Province in the 2017–18 Sunfoil 3-Day Cup on 22 February 2018, taking five wickets in the first innings. He made his List A debut for Eastern Province in the 2017–18 CSA Provincial One-Day Challenge on 11 March 2018.

In August 2018, he was awarded a senior contract by Cricket South Africa ahead of the 2018–19 domestic season. In September 2018, he was named in Eastern Province's squad for the 2018 Africa T20 Cup. In September 2019, he was named in Eastern Province's squad for the 2019–20 CSA Provincial T20 Cup.
