= Waldo Lategan =

South African cricketer (born 1989)

Personal information
- Born: 15 April 1989 (age 37); Oudtshoorn, South Africa
- Source: Cricinfo, 6 September 2015

Waldo Lategan (born 15 April 1989) is a South African first class cricketer. He was included in the South Western Districts cricket team for the 2015 Africa T20 Cup. Lategan since completed his level 3 umpiring course in South Africa, subsequently a proud member of the Western Province Cricket Umpires Association. In 2023, nominated to write and successfully passed the National CSA Cricket Umpiring examination.
