= Jerome Bossr =

South African cricketer (born 1998)

Personal information
- Born: 22 September 1998 (age 28); King William's Town, South Africa

Domestic team information
- Years: Team
- 2019/20–: Border
- Source: Cricinfo, 17 October 2019

Jerome Bossr (born 22 September 1998) is a South African cricketer. He made his List A debut on 20 October 2019, for Border in the 2019–20 CSA Provincial One-Day Challenge. He made his first-class debut on 21 November 2019, for Border in the 2019–20 CSA 3-Day Provincial Cup. He made his Twenty20 debut on 5 October 2021, for Border in the 2021–22 CSA Provincial T20 Knock-Out tournament.
