= Blayde Capell =

South African cricketer (born 1997)

Personal information
- Born: 3 June 1997 (age 29); Pietermaritzburg, South Africa
- Source: ESPNcricinfo, 20 October 2016

Blayde Capell (born 3 June 1997) is a South African cricketer. He made his first-class debut for KwaZulu-Natal in the 2016–17 Sunfoil 3-Day Cup on 20 October 2016. He made his List A debut for KwaZulu-Natal in the 2017–18 CSA Provincial One-Day Challenge on 15 October 2017.

In September 2018, he was named in KwaZulu-Natal's squad for the 2018 Africa T20 Cup. He made his Twenty20 debut for KwaZulu-Natal in the 2018 Africa T20 Cup on 14 September 2018. In September 2019, he was named in KwaZulu-Natal's squad for the 2019–20 CSA Provincial T20 Cup. In April 2021, he was named in South Western Districts' squad, ahead of the 2021–22 cricket season in South Africa.
