= Phillip Vosloo =

South African cricket umpire (born 1971)

Personal information
- Full name: Philip Johannes Vosloo
- Born: 18 May 1971 (age 55)

Umpiring information
- WODIs umpired: 11 (2010–2016)
- WT20Is umpired: 8 (2010–2023)
- Source: ESPNcricinfo, 30 January 2023

Phillip Vosloo (born 18 May 1971) is a South African cricket umpire. He has stood in matches in the Sunfoil 3-Day Cup tournament.
