= Christopher Britz =

South African cricketer (born 1998)

Personal information
- Born: 1 December 1998 (age 27)
- Source: Cricinfo, 22 March 2021

Christopher Britz (born 1 December 1998) is a South African cricketer. He made his List A debut on 21 March 2021, for North West in the 2020–21 CSA Provincial One-Day Challenge. Later the same month, he made his first-class debut in the 2020–21 CSA 3-Day Provincial Cup.
