= Ziyaad Abrahams =

South African cricketer (born 1997)

Personal information
- Born: 27 March 1997 (age 29); Port Elizabeth, Eastern Cape, South Africa
- Source: ESPNcricinfo, 24 September 2016

Ziyaad Abrahams (born 27 March 1997) is a South African cricketer. He made his Twenty20 debut for Boland against Eastern Province in the 2016 Africa T20 Cup on 24 September 2016. Prior to his T20 debut he was named in South Africa's squad for the 2016 Under-19 Cricket World Cup. He made his List A debut for Boland in the 2016–17 CSA Provincial One-Day Challenge on 23 October 2016. He made his first-class debut for Boland in the 2016–17 Sunfoil 3-Day Cup on 27 October 2016.

He was the leading wicket-taker in the 2017–18 CSA Provincial One-Day Challenge tournament for Boland, with 17 dismissals in nine matches.

In September 2018, he was named in Boland's squad for the 2018 Africa T20 Cup. In April 2021, he was named in Boland's squad, ahead of the 2021–22 cricket season in South Africa.
