= Ruan de Swardt =

South African cricketer (born 1998)

Personal information
- Born: 21 January 1998 (age 28); Kempton Park, Gauteng, South Africa
- Batting: Left-handed
- Bowling: Right-arm medium-fast
- Role: Bowling all rounder

International information
- National side: South Africa
- Test debut (cap 361): 4 February 2024 v New Zealand
- Last Test: 13 February 2024 v New Zealand

Domestic team information
- Years: Team
- 2017/18–2019/20: Northerns
- 2020/21–2022/23: Dolphins
- 2023/24–2026/27: North West
- 2026: Leicestershire

Career statistics
Competition	Test	FC	LA	T20
Matches	2	49	55	35
Runs scored	99	2,616	1,424	287
Batting average	33.00	48.44	40.68	16.88
100s/50s	0/1	4/19	4/3	0/0
Top score	64	124	126	45*
Balls bowled	270	5,509	1,936	448
Wickets	3	89	51	25
Bowling average	40.33	30.07	29.05	25.80
5 wickets in innings	0	3	0	0
10 wickets in match	0	0	0	0
Best bowling	2/61	5/52	4/17	3/14
Catches/stumpings	3/–	29/–	25/–	17/–
- Source: ESPNcricinfo, 26 September 2026

Ruan de Swardt (born 21 January 1998) is a South African cricketer. He made his List A debut for Northerns in the 2017–18 CSA Provincial One-Day Challenge on 4 March 2018. In September 2018, he was named in Northerns' squad for the 2018 Africa T20 Cup. He made his first-class debut for Northerns in the 2018–19 CSA 3-Day Provincial Cup on 1 November 2018. He made his Twenty20 debut for Northerns in the 2019–20 CSA Provincial T20 Cup on 13 September 2019.

He was the leading run-scorer in the 2019–20 CSA Provincial One-Day Challenge, with 426 runs in seven matches. In July 2020, de Swardt was named as the CSA Student Cricketer of the Year. In April 2021, he was named in KwaZulu-Natal's squad, ahead of the 2021–22 cricket season in South Africa.

== International career ==
In December 2023, he was selected in South Africa's test squad to tour New Zealand. He made his test debut in February 2024 and picked up 3 wickets across two innings.
