= Jurie Sadler =

South African cricket umpire' (born 1973)

Personal information
- Born: 17 August 1973 (age 53); Volksrust, South Africa

Umpiring information
- Source: Cricinfo, 2 March 2017

Jurie Sadler (born 17 August 1973) is a South African cricket umpire. He has stood in matches in the 2016–17 Sunfoil 3-Day Cup and the 2016–17 CSA Provincial One-Day Challenge tournaments.
