= Andrew Rasemene =

South African cricketer (born 1995)

Personal information
- Born: 25 March 1995 (age 31)
- Batting: Right handed
- Bowling: Right arm medium

Domestic team information
- Years: Team
- 2015 - Present: Northerns
- Source: ESPNcricinfo, 9 September 2016

Andrew Rasemene (born 25 March 1995) is a South African cricketer. Rasemene made his first-class debut for the Northerns against Gauteng He made his List A debut for Northerns against North West on 13 December 2015.

In September 2019, he was named in Limpopo's squad for the 2019–20 CSA Provincial T20 Cup. In April 2021, he was named in Northern Cape's squad, ahead of the 2021–22 cricket season in South Africa.
