= 2016–17 CSA Provincial One-Day Challenge =

Cricket tournament

- Dates: 9 October 2016 – 2 April 2017
- Administrator: Cricket South Africa
- Cricket format: List A
- Tournament format: Round-robin
- Champions: (South Africa) Northerns (3rd title)
- Participants: 14
- Most runs: Grant Thomson (472)
- Most wickets: Thomas Kaber (21)

The 2016–17 CSA Provincial One-Day Challenge was a List A cricket competition that took place in South Africa from 9 October 2016 to 2 April 2017. The competition was played between the thirteen South African provincial teams and Namibia. The tournament was played in parallel with the 2016–17 Sunfoil 3-Day Cup, a first-class competition which featured the same teams.

Northerns finished top of Pool A and Namibia finished top of Pool B, with both teams progressing to the final of the competition. It was the first time that Namibia had reached the final of the One-Day Challenge. In the final, Northerns won the match, beating Namibia by 7 wickets.

== Points table ==
Pool A

Team	Pld	W	L	NR	Pts
(South Africa) Northerns	10	8	1	1	40
(South Africa) KwaZulu-Natal	10	6	3	1	30
(South Africa) North West	10	6	4	0	27
(South Africa) Northern Cape	10	4	4	2	22
(South Africa) Western Province	10	4	5	1	20
(South Africa) South Western Districts	10	3	5	2	17
(South Africa) Border	10	2	7	1	11

Team qualified for the final

Pool B

Team	Pld	W	L	NR	Pts
Namibia	10	6	4	0	27
(South Africa) Eastern Province	10	5	4	1	24
(South Africa) Easterns	10	4	4	2	21
(South Africa) Boland	10	4	5	1	19
(South Africa) Gauteng	10	4	5	1	18
(South Africa) Free State	10	4	6	0	17
(South Africa) KwaZulu-Natal Inland	10	2	5	3	16

Team qualified for the final

== Group stage ==
=== Pool A ===
9 October 2016
Scorecard

North West (South Africa); 323/4 (50 overs)	v	(South Africa) KwaZulu-Natal; 174 (36.5 overs)
Janneman Malan 170* (159); Smangaliso Nhlebela 1/53 (9 overs)		Prenelan Subrayen 59* (63); Johannes Diseko 4/27 (10 overs)

North West won by 149 runs
Senwes Park, Potchefstroom
Umpires: Hassen Dawood and Phillip Vosloo

- KwaZulu-Natal won the toss and elected to field.
- Okuhle Cele, Nazeer Jaffar, Johann Smit, Gareth Wissing and Dudu Zondo (KwaZulu-Natal) all made their List A debuts.

16 October 2016
Scorecard

South Western Districts (South Africa); 227/9 (50 overs)	v	(South Africa) Western Province; 230/2 (45 overs)
Niel Hornbuckle 64 (81); Sybrand Engelbrecht 3/28 (6.2 overs)		Shaheen Khan 79* (97); Siyabonga Booi 2/30 (10 overs)

Western Province won by 8 wickets
Recreation Ground, Oudtshoorn
Umpires: Clifford Isaacs and Faizel Samsoodien

- South Western Districts won the toss and elected to bat.
- Mthobeli Bangindawo, Murray Commins, Christopher Marrow and Jean du Plessis (South Western Districts) all made their List A debuts.

23 October 2016
Scorecard

Border (South Africa); 270 (45.3 overs)	v	(South Africa) North West; 267/7 (50 overs)
Christiaan Jonker 106 (71); Lesego Senokwane 4/13 (4.3 overs)		Richardt Frenz 96* (130); Clayton Bosch 3/48 (10 overs)

Border won by 3 runs
Buffalo Park, East London
Umpires: Bongani Ntshebe and Jeff Wolhuter

- North West won the toss and elected to field.
- Mncedisi Malika (Border) and Dyllan Matthews (North West) both made their List A debuts.

23 October 2016
Scorecard

KwaZulu-Natal (South Africa)	v	(South Africa) Northern Cape

Match abandoned
Chatsworth Stadium, Durban
Umpires: Clifford Isaacs and Arno Jacobs

- No toss.

31 October 2016
Scorecard

Northerns (South Africa); 313/9 (50 overs)	v	(South Africa) KwaZulu-Natal; 161 (37 overs)
Rivaldo Moonsamy 111 (117); Brandon Scullard 4/32 (7.4 overs)		Cody Chetty 60* (111); Grant Thomson 2/30 (6 overs)

Northerns won by 152 runs
Centurion Park, Centurion
Umpires: Haseen Dawood and Brad White

- KwaZulu-Natal won the toss and elected to field.
- Sbonginhlanhla Makhaye, Sithabiso Zungu (KwaZulu-Natal) and Tony de Zorzi (Northerns) all made their List A debuts.

6 November 2016
Scorecard

Northern Cape (South Africa); 269 (45.5 overs)	v	(South Africa) Western Province; 232 (43.3 overs)
Letlotlo Sesele 94 (91); Beuran Hendricks 3/34 (7 overs)		Derek Mitchell 64 (78); Patrick Kruger 4/47 (7.3 overs)

Northern Cape won by 37 runs
Western Province Cricket Club, Cape Town
Umpires: Abdoellah Steenkamp and Jeff Wolhuter

- Northern Cape won the toss and elected to bat.
- Derek Mitchell, Neo Mlumbi and Warren Stoman (Western Province) all made their List A debuts.

13 November 2016
Scorecard

Northerns (South Africa); 226/9 (50 overs)	v	(South Africa) Border; 113 (28 overs)
Grant Thomson 103 (117); Sinovuyo Ntuntwana 2/27 (6 overs)		Marco Marais 39 (39); Ruben Claassen 5/16 (6 overs)

Northerns won by 113 runs
Buffalo Park, East London
Umpires: Bongani Ntshebe and Laurance Willemse

- Border won the toss and elected to field.

20 November 2016
Scorecard

KwaZulu-Natal (South Africa); 201/8 (50 overs)	v	(South Africa) South Western Districts; 137 (43.1 overs)
Sibonelo Makhanya 62 (70); Siyabonga Booi 3/19 (9 overs)		Niel Hornbuckle 40 (61); Tyron Koen 3/9 (7 overs)

KwaZulu-Natal won by 64 runs
Recreation Ground, Oudtshoorn
Umpires: Thomas Mokorosi and Faizel Samsoodien

- KwaZulu-Natal won the toss and elected to bat.
- Tyron Koen (KwaZulu-Natal) made his List A debut.

4 December 2016
Scorecard

Border (South Africa); 290/8 (50 overs)	v	(South Africa) Northern Cape; 293/4 (45.1 overs)
Martin Walters 74 (94); Corné Dry 5/51 (9 overs)		Cloete Buitendag 88 (61); Phaphama Fojela 2/41 (8 overs)

Northern Cape won by 6 wickets
Buffalo Park, East London
Umpires: Rudi Birkenstock and Laurance Willemse

- Border won the toss and elected to bat.

18 December 2016
Scorecard

North West (South Africa); 318/8 (50 overs)	v	(South Africa) Western Province; 248 (42.5 overs)
Wihan Lubbe 78 (89); Shaheen Khan 4/39 (10 overs)		Andrew Puttick 101 (98); Andre Malan 4/49 (8.5 overs)

North West won by 70 runs
Newlands, Cape Town
Umpires: Thomas Mokorosi and Jeff Wolhuter

- North West won the toss and elected to bat.
- Ruan Haasbroek (North West) made his List A debut.

18 December 2016
Scorecard

KwaZulu-Natal (South Africa); 274/7 (50 overs)	v	(South Africa) Border; 165 (38.3 overs)
Calvin Savage 67* (62); Phaphama Fojela 2/42 (9 overs)		Martin Walters 46 (86); Smangaliso Nhlebela 3/39 (9.3 overs)

KwaZulu-Natal won by 109 runs
Kingsmead, Durban
Umpires: Lubabalo Gcuma and Jurie Sadler

- Border won the toss and elected to field.
- Phumzile Majaja (Border) and Gavin Reddy (KwaZulu-Natal) both made their List A debuts.

8 January 2017
Scorecard

Northerns (South Africa)	v	(South Africa) Western Province

Match abandoned
Centurion Park, Centurion
Umpires: Arno Jacobs and B. Lawrence

- No toss.
- No play was possible due to rain.

15 January 2017
Scorecard

Northerns (South Africa); 232/9 (50 overs)	v	(South Africa) South Western Districts; 151 (45.4 overs)
Grant Thomson 73 (108); Glenton Stuurman 5/33 (10 overs)		Jongile Kilani 38 (76); Thomas Kaber 5/35 (10 overs)

Northerns won by 81 runs
Recreation Ground, Oudtshoorn
Umpires: Gladman Gaseba and Faizel Samsoodien

- Northerns won the toss and elected to bat.
- Grant Esau (South Western Districts) made his List A debut.

22 January 2017
Scorecard

Western Province (South Africa); 169 (43.5 overs)	v	(South Africa) KwaZulu-Natal; 170/2 (30.3 overs)
Pieter Malan 76 (100); Smangaliso Nhlebela 3/33 (10 overs)		Khalipha Cele 72 (90); Shaheen Khan 1/33 (8 overs)

KwaZulu-Natal won by 8 wickets
Kingsmead, Durban
Umpires: Lubabalo Gcuma and Kevin Lawrence

- Western Province won the toss and elected to bat.

12 February 2017
Scorecard

North West (South Africa); 260 (48.4 overs)	v	(South Africa) Northerns; 262/7 (47.2 overs)
Richardt Frenz 76 (89); Migael Pretorius 3/34 (8 overs)		Lerato Kgoatle 51* (33); Bantu Dandala 2/36 (8 overs)

Northerns won by 3 wickets
Senwes Park, Potchefstroom
Umpires: Hassen Dawood and Jurie Sadler

- North West won the toss and elected to bat.
- Bantu Dandala (North West) and Gregory Mahlokwana (Northerns) both made their List A debuts.

12 February 2017
Scorecard

South Western Districts (South Africa)	v	(South Africa) Northern Cape

Match abandoned
Recreation Ground, Oudtshoorn
Umpires: Thomas Mokorosi and Faizel Samsoodien

- No toss.

5 March 2017
Scorecard

Border (South Africa); 170 (42.4 overs)	v	(South Africa) Western Province; 172/2 (38 overs)
Gionne Koopman 39 (58); Mthiwekhaya Nabe 4/27 (7.4 overs)		Pieter Malan 81* (115); Phaphama Fojela 1/12 (4 overs)

Western Province won by 8 wickets
Western Province Cricket Club, Cape Town
Umpires: Lester Leendertz and Dennis Smith

- Western Province won the toss and elected to field.
- Jesse Christensen (Western Province) made his List A debut.

5 March 2017
Scorecard

Northern Cape (South Africa); 215/9 (50 overs)	v	(South Africa) North West; 216/7 (42 overs)
Zakir Kathrada 50* (69); Marques Ackerman 3/34 (9 overs)		Marques Ackerman 57 (63); Aidan Brooker 2/41 (7 overs)

North West won by 3 wickets
Diamond Oval, Kimberley
Umpires: Siphelele Gasa and Marlon Jansen

- North West won the toss and elected to field.

12 March 2017
Scorecard

Border (South Africa); 179 (39.4 overs)	v	(South Africa) South Western Districts; 180/2 (33.1 overs)
Marco Marais 53 (65); Marcello Piedt 4/30 (9.4 overs)		Andrea Agathangelou 65* (51); Darryl Brown 2/21 (5 overs)

South Western Districts won by 8 wickets
Buffalo Park, East London
Umpires: Bongani Ntshebe and Laurance Willemse

- South Western Districts won the toss and elected to field.
- Akhona Mnyaka, Jason Niemand (Border) and Todd Walker (South Western Districts) all made their List A debuts.

26 March 2017
Scorecard

North West (South Africa); 260/5 (50 overs)	v	(South Africa) South Western Districts; 127 (41 overs)
Andre Malan 123* (144); Nkululeko Serame 3/47 (10 overs)		Siyabonga Booi 45 (90); Andre Malan 2/15 (8 overs)

North West won by 133 runs
Senwes Park, Potchefstroom
Umpires: Ryan Hendricks and Jack Morton

- South Western Districts won the toss and elected to field.

26 March 2017
Scorecard

Northerns (South Africa); 247/8 (50 overs)	v	(South Africa) Northern Cape; 160 (37.4 overs)
Rubin Hermann 122 (146); Kagiso Mohale 3/53 (9 overs)		Zandrè Swartz 51 (71); Migael Pretorius 3/27 (8 overs)

Northerns won by 87 runs
LC de Villiers Oval, Pretoria
Umpires: Rudi Birkenstock and Abdoellah Steenkamp

- Northern Cape won the toss and elected to field.
- Rubin Hermann (Northerns) made his List A debut.

=== Pool B ===
9 October 2016
Scorecard

Free State (South Africa); 283/7 (50 overs)	v	(South Africa) Easterns; 286/6 (49.1 overs)
Leus du Plooy 148* (133); Clayton August 2/58 (10 overs)		Matthew Arnold 79* (53); Gino Vries 4/69 (10 overs)

Easterns won by 2 wickets
Willowmoore Park, Benoni
Umpires: Stephen Harris and Kevin Lawrence

- Easterns won the toss and elected to field.
- Kyle Degambur, Justin Gamble and Tshepo Motaung (Easterns); Driaan Bruwer, Jonathan Draai and Raynard van Tonder (Free State) all made their List A debuts.

16 October 2016
Scorecard

KwaZulu-Natal Inland (South Africa); 272 (49.5 overs)	v	(South Africa) Gauteng; 274/8 (49.3 overs)
Kyle Nipper 114* (122); Carmi le Roux 4/55 (10 overs)		Ryan Rickelton 93 (117); Mbasa Gqadushe 2/38 (10 overs)

Gauteng won by 6 wickets
New Wanderers Stadium, Johannesburg
Umpires: Arno Jacobs and B. Lawrence

- Gauteng won the toss and elected to field.
- Ryan Rickelton (Gauteng) made his List A debut.

23 October 2016
Scorecard

KwaZulu-Natal Inland (South Africa); 180/8 (32 overs)	v	(South Africa) Boland; 87/3 (17 overs)
Divan van Wyk 33 (31); Justin Ontong 3/27 (7 overs)		Keegan Petersen 29* (32); Yusuf Abdulla 3/17 (5 overs)

No result
City Oval, Pietermaritzburg
Umpires: Rudi Birkenstock and Siphelele Gasa

- Boland won the toss and elected to field.
- Ziyaad Abrahams (Boland) made his List A debut.

23 October 2016
Scorecard

Gauteng (South Africa)	v	(South Africa) Eastern Province

Match abandoned
New Wanderers Stadium, Johannesburg
Umpires: Adrian Holdstock and B. Lawrence

- No toss.

13 November 2016
Scorecard

Eastern Province (South Africa); 279/7 (50 overs)	v	(South Africa) Easterns; 250 (48.3 overs)
David White 127* (122); Clayton August 2/51 (10 overs)		Wesley Coulentianos 73 (81); Ngazibini Sigwili 4/46 (10 overs)

Eastern Province won by 29 runs
St George's Park, Port Elizabeth
Umpires: Stephen Harris and Arno Jacobs

- Easterns won the toss and elected to field.

26 November 2016
Scorecard

Boland (South Africa); 215/9 (50 overs)	v	(South Africa) Free State; 216/5 (47.5 overs)
Simon Khomari 36 (54); Michael Erlank 3/24 (10 overs)		Pite van Biljon 119* (128); Reeve Cyster 2/29 (7 overs)

Free State won by 5 wickets
Boland Park, Paarl
Umpires: Irvin van Kerwel and Jeff Wolhuter

- Free State won the toss and elected to field.
- Reeve Cyster (Boland) made his List A debut.

27 November 2016
Scorecard

Namibia; 302/9 (50 overs)	v	(South Africa) KwaZulu-Natal Inland; 284/9 (50 overs)
Stephan Baard 60 (56); Yusuf Abdulla 3/72 (10 overs)		Imraan Khan 76 (80); Jan Frylinck 3/48 (10 overs)

Namibia won by 18 runs
Sparta Recreational Club, Walvis Bay
Umpires: Jurie Sadler and Claude Thorburn

- KwaZulu-Natal Inland won the toss and elected to field.
- Luke Schlemmer (KwaZulu-Natal Inland) made his List A debut.

27 November 2016
Scorecard

Easterns (South Africa); 228/8 (50 overs)	v	(South Africa) Gauteng; 200 (44.5 overs)
Matthew Arnold 49 (62); Ndumiso Mvelase 3/25 (10 overs)		Izak Cornelis Bergh 59 (81); Matthew Arnold 4/35 (8.5 overs)

Easterns won by 28 runs
Willowmoore Park, Benoni
Umpires: Johan Cloete and B. Lawrence

- Gauteng won the toss and elected to field.

10 December 2016
Scorecard

Namibia; 301/9 (50 overs)	v	(South Africa) Free State; 199 (36.5 overs)
Stephan Baard 85 (93); Marchant de Lange 5/59 (10 overs)		Pite van Biljon 56 (51); Bernard Scholtz 4/39 (6 overs)

Namibia won by 102 runs
Mangaung Oval, Bloemfontein
Umpires: Ryan Hendricks and Jack Morton

- Namibia won the toss and elected to bat.

11 December 2016
Scorecard

KwaZulu-Natal Inland (South Africa); 157/4 (35 overs)	v	(South Africa) Easterns
Divan van Wyk 78 (94); Tumelo Simelane 2/43 (8 overs)

No result
City Oval, Pietermaritzburg
Umpires: Gladman Gaseba and B. Lawrence

- Tumelo Simelane (Easterns) made his List A debut.

18 December 2016
Scorecard

Boland (South Africa); 250/9 (50 overs)	v	(South Africa) Eastern Province; 228 (47.2 overs)
Jean Bredenkamp 46 (76); Solo Nqweni 4/63 (10 overs)		David White 75 (117); Niel Botha 3/32 (10 overs)

Boland won by 22 runs
Pollock Field, Port Elizabeth
Umpires: Gladman Gaseba and Arno Jacobs

- Eastern Province won the toss and elected to field.

18 December 2016
Scorecard

Gauteng (South Africa); 226 (49.4 overs)	v	Namibia; 227/3 (43.2 overs)
Matt McGillivray 54 (79); Tangeni Lungameni 3/35 (10 overs)		Stephan Baard 93 (93); Izak Cornelis Bergh 1/25 (5 overs)

Namibia won by 7 wickets
New Wanderers Stadium, Johannesburg
Umpires: Abdoellah Steenkamp and Phillip Vosloo

- Gauteng won the toss and elected to bat.

15 January 2017
Scorecard

Easterns (South Africa); 257/9 (50 overs)	v	Namibia; 166 (41.2 overs)
Ernest Kemm 110 (136); Tangeni Lungameni 3/41 (8 overs)		Michau du Preez 51 (62); Tumelo Simelane 6/19 (8.2 overs)

Easterns won by 91 runs
Wanderers Cricket Ground, Windhoek
Umpires: Jurie Sadler

- Namibia won the toss and elected to field.
- Karl Birkenstock, Jacques Fourie, Hermias Strauss and Ricardo Strauss (Namibia) all made their List A debuts.

15 January 2017
Scorecard

Boland (South Africa); 199 (47.2 overs)	v	(South Africa) Gauteng; 205/4 (45.5 overs)
Jean Bredenkamp 74 (88); Carmi le Roux 4/41 (10 overs)		Farhaan Sayanvala 60* (53); Lizaad Williams 2/43 (10 overs)

Gauteng won by 6 wickets
Boland Park, Paarl
Umpires: Lubabalo Gcuma and Irvin van Kerwel

- Boland won the toss and elected to bat.
- Farhaan Sayanvala (Gauteng) made his List A debut.

22 January 2017
Scorecard

Free State (South Africa); 181 (40.1 overs)	v	(South Africa) Gauteng; 184/6 (41.4 overs)
Dillon du Preez 34 (30); Masilo Ramothata 3/24 (6.1 overs)		Ryan Rickelton 88* (121); Lwandiswa Zuma 2/37 (8 overs)

Gauteng won by 4 wickets
Mangaung Oval, Bloemfontein
Umpires: Marlon Jansen and Lester Leendertz

- Gauteng won the toss and elected to field.

22 January 2017
Scorecard

Eastern Province (South Africa); 156 (44.5 overs)	v	Namibia; 151 (43.4 overs)
David White 52 (83); Danie van Schoor 3/21 (6.5 overs)		Craig Williams 47 (70); Ngazibini Sigwili 4/36 (8.4 overs)

Eastern Province won by 5 runs
Wanderers Cricket Ground, Windhoek
Umpires: Hassen Dawood and Andrew Louw

- Eastern Province won the toss and elected to bat.
- Danie van Schoor (Namibia) made his List A debut.

12 February 2017
Scorecard

Eastern Province (South Africa); 258/5 (50 overs)	v	(South Africa) Free State; 198 (48.4 overs)
David White 102 (128); Dillon du Preez 3/41 (10 overs)		Romano Terblanche 54 (99); Brad Dolley 3/28 (10 overs)

Eastern Province won by 60 runs
Mangaung Oval, Bloemfontein
Umpires: Ryan Hendricks and Marlon Jansen

- Eastern Province won the toss and elected to bat.
- Luvuyo Adam, Matthew Breetzke, Dumisani Magala and Lutho Sipamla (Eastern Province) all made their List A debuts.

26 February 2017
Scorecard

KwaZulu-Natal Inland (South Africa); 128 (38.3 overs)	v	(South Africa) Eastern Province; 129/2 (29.1 overs)
Mbasa Gqadushe 26 (32); Tian Koekemoer 3/8 (7 overs)		Edward Moore 78* (88); Mbasa Gqadushe 1/25 (8 overs)

Eastern Province won by 8 wickets
St George's Park, Port Elizabeth
Umpires: Gladman Gaseba and Abdoellah Steenkamp

- KwaZulu-Natal Inland won the toss and elected to bat.
- Matthew Luksich and Kerwin Mungroo (KwaZulu-Natal Inland) both made their List A debuts.

12 March 2017
Scorecard

Free State (South Africa); 157 (34.4 overs)	v	(South Africa) KwaZulu-Natal Inland; 160/2 (35.1 overs)
Raynard van Tonder 52 (54); Gareth Dukes 3/30 (8 overs)		Sarel Erwee 53 (65); Sean Whitehead 1/27 (10 overs)

KwaZulu-Natal Inland won by 8 wickets
City Oval, Pietermaritzburg
Umpires: Hassen Dawood and Phillip Vosloo

- KwaZulu-Natal Inland won the toss and elected to field.
- Johan van Dyk (Free State) made his List A debut.

18 March 2017
Scorecard

Boland (South Africa); 278/6 (50 overs)	v	(South Africa) Easterns; 282/2 (47.4 overs)
Jean Bredenkamp 93* (92); David Mogotlane 2/25 (6 overs)		Wesley Marshall 105 (114); Mangaliso Mtiya 1/56 (8.4 overs)

Easterns won by 8 wickets
Willowmoore Park, Benoni
Umpires: Lubabalo Gcuma and Abdoellah Steenkamp

- Easterns won the toss and elected to field.

26 March 2017
Scorecard

Namibia; 209/7 (50 overs)	v	(South Africa) Boland; 157 (34 overs)
Lo-handre Louwrens 60 (85); Godfrey Stevens 3/34 (10 overs)		Ferisco Adams 42 (50); Jan Frylinck 4/21 (6 overs)

Namibia won by 77 runs
Boland Park, Paarl
Umpires: Jurie Sadler and Irvin van Kerwel

- Boland won the toss and elected to field.
- Brandon Glover (Boland) made his List A debut.

=== Cross Pool ===
9 October 2016
Scorecard

Namibia; 172 (49 overs)	v	(South Africa) Western Province; 173/6 (36.2 overs)
Gerrie Snyman 47 (49); George Linde 4/19 (10 overs)		Sybrand Engelbrecht 51* (81); Bernard Scholtz 2/34 (8.2 overs)

Western Province won by 4 wickets
Sparta Recreational Club, Walvis Bay

- Namibia won the toss and elected to bat.
- Colin Peake (Namibia) and Dayyaan Galiem (Western Province) both made their List A debuts.

17 October 2016
Scorecard

Eastern Province (South Africa); 182 (41.3 overs)	v	(South Africa) Northerns; 186/5 (34.2 overs)
Gihahn Cloete 70 (82); Roger Arendse 5/33 (7.3 overs)		Jonathan Vandiar 85 (79); Anrich Nortje 3/53 (9.2 overs)

Northerns won by 5 wickets
Centurion Park, Centurion
Umpires: Siphelele Gasa and Jurie Sadler

- Northerns won the toss and elected to field.

30 October 2016
Scorecard

Western Province (South Africa); 274/6 (50 overs)	v	(South Africa) Boland; 275/6 (49.4 overs)
Sybrand Engelbrecht 76 (74); Godfrey Stevens 2/40 (10 overs)		Keegan Petersen 115* (118); Dayyaan Galiem 2/49 (10 overs)

Boland won by 4 wickets
Boland Park, Paarl
Umpires: Murray Brown and Abdoellah Steenkamp

- Boland won the toss and elected to field.
- Charl Cyster and Mangaliso Mtiya (Boland) both made their List A debuts.

30 October 2016
Scorecard

Free State (South Africa); 350/6 (50 overs)	v	(South Africa) Border; 304 (47.1 overs)
Pite van Biljon 167* (129); Darryl Brown 3/47 (7 overs)		Marco Marais 76 (88); Lwandiswa Zuma 4/26 (6.1 overs)

Free State won by 46 runs
Mangaung Oval, Bloemfontein
Umpires: Johan Cloete and Marlon Jansen

- Free State won the toss and elected to bat.
- Sithembile Langa and Sesona Ndwandwa (Border) both made their List A debuts.

30 October 2016
Scorecard

Easterns (South Africa); 232/8 (50 overs)	v	(South Africa) South Western Districts; 236/7 (49.4 overs)
Sizwe Masondo 70 (111); Gurshwin Rabie 2/31 (9 overs)		Andrea Agathangelou 90 (82); David Mogotlane 2/27 (6.4 overs)

South Western Districts won by 3 wickets
Willowmoore Park, Benoni
Umpires: Gerrie Pienaar and Jurie Sadler

- South Western Districts won the toss and elected to field.
- David Mogotlane and Ruan Sadler (Easterns) made their List A debuts.

6 November 2016
Scorecard

KwaZulu-Natal Inland (South Africa); 27/2 (6.3 overs)	v	(South Africa) South Western Districts
Sohail Mahmoud 11* (20); Ottniel Baartman 2/15 (3.3 overs)

No result
City Oval, Pietermaritzburg
Umpires: Thomas Mokorosi and Phillip Vosloo

- South Western Districts won the toss and elected to field.

13 November 2016
Scorecard

Boland (South Africa); 157 (40.5 overs)	v	(South Africa) Northern Cape; 160/4 (20 overs)
Fenito Mehl 33 (71); Corné Dry 5/35 (10 overs)		Letlotlo Sesele 63 (29); Mangaliso Mtiya 3/43 (3 overs)

Northern Cape won by 6 wickets
Diamond Oval, Kimberley
Umpires: Ryan Hendricks and Jack Morton

- Northern Cape won the toss and elected to field.
- Isma-eel Gafieldien, Fenito Mehl, Ricardo Vasconcelos (Boland) and Cloete Buitendag (Northern Cape) all made their List A debuts.

20 November 2016
Scorecard

Namibia; 225/7 (50 overs)	v	(South Africa) North West; 158 (38.1 overs)
Sarel Burger 62 (87); Brady Barends 2/37 (8 overs)		Janneman Malan 35 (36); Nicolaas Scholtz 4/38 (9.1 overs)

Namibia won by 67 runs
Wanderers Cricket Ground, Windhoek
Umpires: Arno Jacobs and Wynand Louw

- Namibia won the toss and elected to bat.
- Tshepo Seroalo (North West) made his List A debut.

4 December 2016
Scorecard

Boland (South Africa); 161 (44.4 overs)	v	(South Africa) South Western Districts; 82 (29 overs)
Mangaliso Mtiya 31 (40); Justin Jordaan 3/17 (10 overs)		Brendon Louw 22 (39); Ferisco Adams 4/23 (7 overs)

Boland won by 79 runs
Boland Park, Paarl
Umpires: Marlon Jansen and Lester Leendertz

- Boland won the toss and elected to bat.

17 December 2016
Scorecard

KwaZulu-Natal Inland (South Africa); 194 (40.5 overs)	v	(South Africa) Northern Cape; 200/3 (27.4 overs)
Divan van Wyk 104 (118); Warren Bell 6/34 (8 overs)		Jacques Snyman 88 (63); Attie Maposa 2/41 (5.4 overs)

Northern Cape won by 7 wickets
Diamond Oval, Kimberley
Umpires: Rudi Birkenstock and Ryan Hendricks

- Northern Cape won the toss and elected to field.
- Jacques Snyman (Northern Cape) made his List A debut.

8 January 2017
Scorecard

Border (South Africa); 209 (45.4 overs)	v	(South Africa) Eastern Province; 211/7 (47 overs)
Darryl Brown 85 (97); Solo Nqweni 3/50 (10 overs)		Onke Nyaku 67 (96); Sinovuyo Ntuntwana 4/48 (9 overs)

Eastern Province won by 3 wickets
St George's Park, Port Elizabeth
Umpires: Gladman Gaseba and Abdoellah Steenkamp

- Border won the toss and elected to bat.
- Bradley Williams (Border) made his List A debut.

15 January 2017
Scorecard

KwaZulu-Natal (South Africa); 189/9 (50 overs)	v	(South Africa) Eastern Province; 170 (46.1 overs)
Jason Oakes 67* (100); Anrich Nortje 3/40 (10 overs)		Mathew Christensen 44 (66); Okuhle Cele 3/26 (9 overs)

KwaZulu-Natal won by 19 runs
Chatsworth Stadium, Durban
Umpires: Arno Jacobs and Bongani Ntshebe

- KwaZulu-Natal won the toss and elected to bat.
- Junaid Dawood (Eastern Province) and Gavin Morris (KwaZulu-Natal) both made their List A debuts.

22 January 2017
Scorecard

Boland (South Africa); 313/8 (50 overs)	v	(South Africa) North West; 312 (49.5 overs)
Jean Bredenkamp 110 (115); Brady Barends 3/56 (10 overs)		Janneman Malan 55 (35); Fenito Mehl 3/57 (9 overs)

Boland won by 1 run
Senwes Park, Potchefstroom
Umpires: Siphelele Gasa and Irvin van Kerwel

- North West won the toss and elected to field.

22 January 2017
Scorecard

Easterns (South Africa); 199 (45.3 overs)	v	(South Africa) Northerns; 200/2 (30.3 overs)
Daniel Sincuba 50 (65); Grant Thomson 2/26 (4 overs)		AB de Villiers 134* (103); Tumelo Simelane 2/40 (7 overs)

Northerns won by 8 wickets
Willowmoore Park, Benoni
Umpires: Rudi Birkenstock and Arno Jacobs

- Northerns won the toss and elected to field.

29 January 2017
Scorecard

Free State (South Africa); 295/6 (50 overs)	v	(South Africa) Northern Cape; 182 (36.3 overs)
Andries Gous 149 (145); Kagiso Mohale 3/66 (8 overs)		Jacques Snyman 46 (50); Dillon du Preez 5/31 (8 overs)

Free State won by 113 runs
Diamond Oval, Kimberley
Umpires: Ryan Hendricks and Kevin Lawrence

- Northern Cape won the toss and elected to field.

12 February 2017
Scorecard

Easterns (South Africa); 232/8 (43 overs)	v	(South Africa) Western Province; 233/6 (37.5 overs)
Ernest Kemm 42 (55); Dayyaan Galiem 3/31 (7 overs)		Zubayr Hamza 73 (69); Ruan Sadler 3/43 (9 overs)

Western Province won by 4 wickets
Newlands, Cape Town
Umpires: Siphelele Gasa and Irvin van Kerwel

- Western Province won the toss and elected to field.

12 February 2017
Scorecard

KwaZulu-Natal Inland (South Africa); 174 (48.3 overs)	v	(South Africa) KwaZulu-Natal; 131/3 (37 overs)
Kyle Nipper 76 (118); Okuhle Cele 4/30 (7.3 overs)		Bruce Kerr 52 (74); Craig Alexander 3/10 (8 overs)

KwaZulu-Natal won by 24 runs (D/L method)
City Oval, Pietermaritzburg
Umpires: Gladman Gaseba and Clifford Isaacs

- KwaZulu-Natal Inland won the toss and elected to bat.
- Eathan Bosch and Zakariya Paruk (KwaZulu-Natal) both made their List A debuts.

19 February 2017
Scorecard

Border (South Africa)	v	(South Africa) Easterns

Match abandoned
Buffalo Park, East London
Umpires: Thomas Mokorosi and Bongani Ntshebe

- No toss.
- No play was possible due to rain.

19 February 2017
Scorecard

KwaZulu-Natal (South Africa); 202/6 (42 overs)	v	(South Africa) Free State; 177/3 (29.2 overs)
Bruce Kerr 73 (98); Dillon du Preez 2/25 (9 overs)		Paballo Mogoera 79* (83); Zakariya Paruk 1/17 (4 overs)

Free State won by 7 wickets (D/L method)
Chatsworth Stadium, Durban
Umpires: Jurie Sadler and Abdoellah Steenkamp

- Free State won the toss and elected to field.
- Nealan van Heerden (Free State) made his List A debut.

26 February 2017
Scorecard

North West (South Africa); 294/6 (50 overs)	v	(South Africa) Gauteng; 290/8 (50 overs)
Richardt Frenz 102 (127); Zaid Saloojee 2/65 (10 overs)		Ryan Rickelton 73 (89); Johannes Diseko 3/51 (10 overs)

North West won by 4 runs
Senwes Park, Potchefstroom
Umpires: Kevin Lawrence and Phillip Vosloo

- Gauteng won the toss and elected to field.
- Nandre Burger (Gauteng) and Jovuan van Wyngaardt (North West) both made their List A debuts.

4 March 2017
Scorecard

Namibia; 166 (49.2 overs)	v	(South Africa) South Western Districts; 170/2 (41.3 overs)
Zane Green 59 (97); Justin Jordaan 3/29 (9.2 overs)		Andrea Agathangelou 92* (99); Sarel Burger 1/16 (8 overs)

South Western Districts won by 8 wickets
Recreation Ground, Oudtshoorn
Umpires: Faizel Samsoodien and Abdoellah Steenkamp

- Namibia won the toss and elected to bat.

12 March 2017
Scorecard

Gauteng (South Africa); 125 (39.4 overs)	v	(South Africa) KwaZulu-Natal; 125/6 (34 overs)
Shaylen Pillay 52 (79); Eathan Bosch 5/26 (10 overs)		Khalipha Cele 43 (75); Keith Dudgeon 4/21 (10 overs)

KwaZulu-Natal won by 4 wickets
New Wanderers Stadium, Johannesburg
Umpires: Kevin Lawrence and Faizel Samsoodien

- KwaZulu-Natal won the toss and elected to field.

12 March 2017
Scorecard

Northerns (South Africa); 202 (48 overs)	v	Namibia; 204/6 (46.2 overs)
Ruben Claassen 57 (46); Danie van Schoor 3/32 (6 overs)		Gerrie Snyman 42 (63); Thomas Kaber 2/47 (8 overs)

Namibia won by 4 wickets
Centurion Park, Centurion
Umpires: Rudi Birkenstock and Abdoellah Steenkamp

- Namibia won the toss and elected to field.
- Stefan Klopper (Northerns) made his List A debut.

12 March 2017
Scorecard

North West (South Africa); 166/6 (26 overs)	v	(South Africa) Eastern Province; 143 (25.5 overs)
Andre Malan 53 (59); Solo Nqweni 2/21 (4 overs)		Edward Moore 50 (51); Ayavuya Myoli 3/18 (5 overs)

North West won by 23 runs
St George's Park, Port Elizabeth
Umpires: Arno Jacobs and Lester Leendertz

- North West won the toss and elected to bat.

19 March 2017
Scorecard

Free State (South Africa); 203 (47 overs)	v	(South Africa) Northerns; 204/5 (44.1 overs)
Michael Erlank 67 (77); Thomas Kaber 3/4 (5 overs)		Grant Thomson 94* (112); Lwandiswa Zuma 2/20 (8 overs)

Northerns won by 5 wickets
Mangaung Oval, Bloemfontein
Umpires: Siphelele Gasa and Jack Morton

- Northerns won the toss and elected to field.

19 March 2017
Scorecard

Northern Cape (South Africa); 249/9 (50 overs)	v	(South Africa) Gauteng; 252/8 (48.3 overs)
Warren Bell 79 (99); Keith Dudgeon 3/31 (10 overs)		Devon Conway 127* (128); Cloete Buitendag 3/32 (8 overs)

Gauteng won by 2 wickets
Diamond Oval, Kimberley

- Northern Cape won the toss and elected to bat.
- Chad Classen (Gauteng) made his List A debut.

26 March 2017
Scorecard

Border (South Africa); 257/7 (50 overs)	v	(South Africa) Gauteng; 166 (30.4 overs)
Marco Marais 100 (102); Nono Pongolo 3/49 (10 overs)		Ndumiso Mvelase 50 (32); Sithembile Langa 3/27 (6 overs)

Border won by 91 runs
New Wanderers Stadium, Johannesburg
Umpires: Siphelele Gasa and Gerrie Pienaar

- Border won the toss and elected to bat.
- Sekela Ngadlela (Border) made his List A debut.

26 March 2017
Scorecard

KwaZulu-Natal Inland (South Africa); 265/6 (48 overs)	v	(South Africa) Western Province; 104 (28.3 overs)
Ruhan Pretorius 122* (120); Dayyaan Galiem 2/64 (8 overs)		Dayyaan Galiem 44 (47); Craig Alexander 4/14 (4.3 overs)

KwaZulu-Natal Inland won by 161 runs
Newlands, Cape Town
Umpires: Hassen Dawood and Lester Leendertz

- KwaZulu-Natal Inland won the toss and elected to bat.
- Josh van Eeden (KwaZulu-Natal Inland) made his List A debut.

== Final ==
2 April 2017
Scorecard

Namibia; 245 (48.3 overs)	v	(South Africa) Northerns; 251/3 (43.1 overs)
Craig Williams 57 (56); Grant Thomson 5/50 (8.3 overs)		Jonathan Vandiar 99 (103); Jan Frylinck 1/47 (10 overs)

Northerns won by 7 wickets
Centurion Park, Centurion
Umpires: Thomas Mokorosi and Abdoellah Steenkamp

- Northerns won the toss and elected to field.
