= 2019–20 CSA Provincial One-Day Challenge =

Cricket tournament

- Dates: 6 October 2019 – 29 March 2020
- Administrator: Cricket South Africa
- Cricket format: List A
- Tournament format: Round-robin
- Champions: Free State; Northern Cape
- Participants: 13
- Most runs: Ruan de Swardt (426)
- Most wickets: Codi Yusuf (16); Basheeru-Deen Walters (16)

The 2019–20 CSA Provincial One-Day Challenge was a domestic one-day cricket tournament that took place in South Africa from October to March 2020. The tournament was played in parallel with the 2019–20 CSA 3-Day Provincial Cup, a first-class competition which featured the same teams. On 16 March 2020, Cricket South Africa suspended all cricket in the country for 60 days due to the COVID-19 pandemic. On 24 March 2020, Free State and Northern Cape were named as the joint-winners of the tournament, after finishing top of Groups A and B respectively. This was following the recommendations made by Graeme Smith, the acting Director of Cricket.

The competition was played between the thirteen South African provincial teams. In previous editions of the competition, Namibia had also competed, but they withdrew ahead of the start of the previous tournament, citing issues around costs and logistics. Easterns were the defending champions.

== Points table ==
Pool A

Team	Pld	W	L	T	NR	Pts
Free State	9	6	1	0	2	32
Gauteng	9	6	3	0	0	27
Easterns	9	5	3	0	1	24
Eastern Province	10	4	5	0	1	20
KwaZulu-Natal Inland	10	3	4	1	2	20
Boland	9	0	6	0	3	6

Pool B

Team	Pld	W	L	T	NR	Pts
Northern Cape	9	7	1	0	1	33
Northerns	9	6	2	0	1	31
South Western Districts	10	4	5	0	1	21
Western Province	9	4	5	0	0	17
KwaZulu-Natal	9	2	5	1	1	14
North West	9	3	6	0	0	13
Border	9	2	6	0	1	10

== Fixtures ==
=== October 2019 ===
6 October 2019
Scorecard

KwaZulu-Natal; 125 (38.5 overs)	v	South Western Districts; 127/6 (35 overs)
Blayde Capell 30 (37); Hershell America 2/26 (7 overs)		Richardt Frenz 50 (92); Smangaliso Nhlebela 3/33 (10 overs)

South Western Districts won by 4 wickets
Kingsmead, Durban
Umpires: Siphelele Gasa and Jurie Sadler

- KwaZulu-Natal won the toss and elected to bat.
- Nhlanhla Dlamini, Matthew Pollard (KwaZulu-Natal), Heath Richards, Tyrese Karelse and Tshepiso Ndwandwa (South Western Districts) all made their List A debuts.

6 October 2019
Scorecard

KwaZulu-Natal Inland; 269/8 (50 overs)	v	Gauteng; 272/4 (47.1 overs)
Kyle Nipper 68 (86); Codi Yusuf 3/44 (8 overs)		Shaylen Pillay 57* (66); Kurtlyn Mannikam 2/41 (7.1 overs)

Gauteng won by 6 wickets
City Oval, Pietermaritzburg
Umpires: Arno Jacobs and Philip Vosloo

- KwaZulu-Natal Inland won the toss and elected to bat.
- Waseem Rahman (KwaZulu-Natal Inland) and Codi Yusuf (Gauteng) both made their List A debuts.

6 October 2019
Scorecard

Eastern Province; 188 (48.3 overs)	v	Easterns; 190/4 (38.3 overs)
Mathew Christensen 35 (48); Khwezi Gumede 3/32 (8.3 overs)		Jurie Snyman 52 (70); Sithembile Langa 2/32 (6 overs)

Easterns won by 6 wickets
Willowmoore Park, Benoni

- Easterns won the toss and elected to field.

13 October 2019
Scorecard

Eastern Province; 221 (37.5 overs)	v	Northern Cape; 224/4 (37.1 overs)
Thomas Kaber 66 (52); Beyers Swanepoel 3/42 (5 overs)		Jacques Snyman 59 (42); Kenan Smith 1/19 (5 overs)

Northern Cape won by 6 wickets
St George's Park, Port Elizabeth
Umpires: Arno Jacobs and Siphelele Gasa

- Northern Cape won the toss and elected to field.
- The match was reduced to 38 overs per side due to rain.

13 October 2019
Scorecard

South Western Districts; 217 (44.4 overs)	v	Free State; 219/9 (50 overs)
Ndumiso Mvelase 81 (85); Sean Whitehead 3/33 (10 overs)		Dilivio Ridgaard 59 (82); Brendon Louw 2/27 (5 overs)

Free State won by 1 wicket
Recreation Ground, Oudtshoorn
Umpires: Philip Vosloo and Abdoellah Steenkamp

- South Western Districts won the toss and elected to bat.
- Peetjan du Plessis (Free State) made his List A debut.

19 October 2019
Scorecard

Western Province; 245/8 (50 overs)	v	Northerns; 249/7 (47.2 overs)
Jesse Christensen 98 (91); Gionne Koopman 3/34 (10 overs)		Ruan de Swardt 102* (111); Thando Ntini 3/51 (10 overs)

Northerns won by 3 wickets
Newlands, Cape Town
Umpires: Thomas Mokorosi and Clifford Isaacs

- Northerns won the toss and elected to field.
- Tayo Walbrugh, Sisonke Mazele (Western Province), Evan Jones and Donavon Ferreira (Northerns) all made their List A debuts.

20 October 2019
Scorecard

Border; 238 (47 overs)	v	North West; 214 (48.5 overs)
Jason Niemand 90 (91); Henro van Rensburg 5/57 (10 overs)		Nicholas Smit 102 (126); Ayabulela Gqamane 4/28 (7 overs)

Border won by 24 runs
Senwes Park, Potchefstroom
Umpires: Abongile Sodumo and Abdoellah Steenkamp

- Border won the toss and elected to bat.
- Nicholas Smit, Bradley Lynch, Henro van Rensburg (North West), Jacques Porter, Jerome Bossr and Alindile Mhletywa (Border) all made their List A debuts.

20 October 2019
Scorecard

Boland; 48 (17.3 overs)	v	Gauteng; 49/0 (7.2 overs)
Reeve Cyster 8* (21); Aristides Karvelas 5/16 (9 overs)		Zakir Kathrada 26* (22)

Gauteng won by 10 wickets
New Wanderers Stadium, Johannesburg
Umpires: Lauren Agenbag and Murray Brown

- Gauteng won the toss and elected to field.

26 October 2019
Scorecard

Boland	v	Northerns

Match abandoned
Boland Park, Paarl
Umpires: Clifford Isaacs and Jurie Sadler

- No toss.
- No play was possible due to rain.

27 October 2019
Scorecard

Border; 289/8 (50 overs)	v	Eastern Province; 292/3 (48.2 overs)
Jason Niemand 108 (94); Kenan Smith 3/42 (8 overs)		Lesiba Ngoepe 108* (119); Bradley Mauer 2/49 (10 overs)

Eastern Province won by 7 wickets
Buffalo Park, East London
Umpires: Jan Erasmus and Murray Brown

- Eastern Province won the toss and elected to field.
- Lyle Peterson (Eastern Province) made his List A debut.

27 October 2019
Scorecard

Gauteng; 127 (39.1 overs)	v	Free State; 128/5 (17.1 overs)
Shaylen Pillay 36 (75); Sean Whitehead 3/21 (10 overs)		Andries Gous 62 (31); Codi Yusuf 3/18 (3 overs)

Free State won by 5 wickets
New Wanderers Stadium, Johannesburg
Umpires: Thomas Mokorosi and Gawie Botha

- Free State won the toss and elected to field.

27 October 2019
Scorecard

North West; 126 (33.1 overs)	v	Western Province; 127/2 (18.1 overs)
Lesego Senokwane 21 (28); Mihlali Mpongwana 4/32 (8 overs)		Andre Malan 48 (20); Eldred Hawken 2/48 (9.1 overs)

Western Province won by 8 wickets
Senwes Park, Potchefstroom
Umpires: Mazizi Gampu and Abdoellah Steenkamp

- Western Province won the toss and elected to field.
- Ryan Klein (Western Province) made his List A debut.

27 October 2019
Scorecard

KwaZulu-Natal Inland; 237/8 (50 overs)	v	Easterns; 239/6 (48 overs)
Kushen Kishun 45* (64); Jurie Snyman 4/43 (10 overs)		Kabelo Sekhukhune 84* (125); Nduduzo Mfoza 2/55 (10 overs)

Easterns won by 4 wickets
Willowmoore Park, Benoni
Umpires: Dennis Smith and Ryan Hendricks

- Easterns won the toss and elected to field.

=== November 2019 ===
3 November 2019
Scorecard

Western Province; 72 (20.3 overs)	v	Free State; 75/5 (13 overs)
Mihlali Mpongwana 12 (14); Shadley van Schalkwyk 5/19 (8 overs)		Shadley van Schalkwyk 16* (10); Justin Dill 2/19 (6 overs)

Free State won by 5 wickets
University of Free State Ground, Bloemfontein
Umpires: Lauren Agenbag and Philip Vosloo

- Free State won the toss and elected to field.

3 November 2019
Scorecard

KwaZulu-Natal; 192 (42.5 overs)	v	Northern Cape; 195/1 (34.3 overs)
Khalipha Cele 43 (78); Aubrey Swanepoel 4/41 (9.5 overs)		Jacques Snyman 111* (73); Neill Jordaan 1/42 (10 overs)

Northern Cape won by 9 wickets
Diamond Oval, Kimberley
Umpires: Lubabalo Gcuma and Marlon Jansen

- KwaZulu-Natal won the toss and elected to bat.
- Neill Jordaan (KwaZulu-Natal) made his List A debut.

3 November 2019
Scorecard

Easterns; 229/9 (50 overs)	v	North West; 196 (47.4 overs)
Wesley Coulentianos 72 (84); Johannes Diseko 3/28 (9 overs)		Henro van Rensburg 39 (43); Dyllan Matthews 3/52 (10 overs)

Easterns won by 33 runs
Senwes Park, Potchefstroom
Umpires: Abongile Sodumo and Murray Brown

- Easterns won the toss and elected to bat.
- Jesse Albanie (North West) made his List A debut.

10 November 2019
Scorecard

South Western Districts; 151 (37.4 overs)	v	Gauteng; 152/2 (26.2 overs)
Ndumiso Mvelase 36 (39); Tumelo Tlhokwe 3/32 (6.4 overs)		Zakir Kathrada 71* (88); Ndumiso Mvelase 1/13 (3 overs)

Gauteng won by 8 wickets
Recreation Ground, Oudtshoorn
Umpires: Godwin Von Willingh and Stephen Rex

- South Western Districts won the toss and elected to bat.

10 November 2019
Scorecard

Free State; 276/9 (50 overs)	v	Boland; 164 (48 overs)
Wandile Makwetu 119 (124); Ziyaad Abrahams 4/32 (10 overs)		Sinalo Gobeni 47 (81); Shadley van Schalkwyk 5/25 (10 overs)

Free State won by 112 runs
Mangaung Oval, Bloemfontein
Umpires: Rudi Birkenstock and Gawie Botha

- Boland won the toss and elected to field.

10 November 2019
Scorecard

Northern Cape; 280/9 (50 overs)	v	Northerns; 254 (47.5 overs)
Jacques Snyman 135 (124); Diego Rosier 5/71 (10 overs)		Ruan de Swardt 114 (115); Jacques Snyman 5/33 (7.5 overs)

Northern Cape won by 26 runs
Diamond Oval, Kimberley
Umpires: Ryan Hendricks and Marlon Jansen

- Northerns won the toss and elected to field.
- Modiri Litheko (Northerns) made his List A debut.

17 November 2019
Scorecard

Western Province; 263/5 (46 overs)	v	Border; 254 (45.5 overs)
Pieter Malan 134 (141); Athule Kotta 1/31 (8 overs)		Bradley Williams 114 (124); Andre Malan 5/57 (9 overs)

Western Province won by 11 runs (DLS method)
Buffalo Park, East London
Umpires: Sinethemba Mjekula and Jurie Sadler

- Border won the toss and elected to field.
- The match was reduced to 46 overs per side due to a wet outfield.
- Athule Kotta (Border) and Diego du Plessis (Western Province) both made their List A debuts.

17 November 2019
Scorecard

North West; 136 (45.5 overs)	v	Northern Cape; 139/2 (19.5 overs)
Henro van Rensburg 24 (34); Beyers Swanepoel 3/21 (8 overs)		Jacques Snyman 60* (37); Katleho Leokaoke 1/14 (2 overs)

Northern Cape won by 8 wickets
Senwes Park, Potchefstroom
Umpires: Kevin Lawrence and Ryan Hendricks

- North West won the toss and elected to bat.
- Eben Botha (North West) made his List A debut.

17 November 2019
Scorecard

South Western Districts; 100 (32.2 overs)	v	Northerns; 101/2 (20.3 overs)
Yamkela Oliphant 27 (69); Diego Rosier 3/7 (2 overs)		Jiveshan Pillay 51* (66); Bailey Aarons 1/17 (2 overs)

Northerns won by 8 wickets
Tshwane University of Technology Oval, Pretoria
Umpires: Jan Erasmus and Mazizi Gampu

- Northerns won the toss and elected to field.
- The match was reduced to 45 overs per side due to a wet outfield.

17 November 2019
Scorecard

KwaZulu-Natal; 279/7 (50 overs)	v	Easterns; 281/9 (49.2 overs)
Khalipha Cele 91 (122); Imran Manack 4/52 (10 overs)		Wesley Coulentianos 50 (72); Khalipha Cele 2/29 (8 overs)

Easterns won by 1 wicket
Willowmoore Park, Benoni
Umpires: Bongani Ntshebe and Marlon Jansen

- Easterns won the toss and elected to field.

17 November 2019
Scorecard

Eastern Province; 256/9 (50 overs)	v	Boland; 231 (47.1 overs)
Lesiba Ngoepe 53 (85); Ziyaad Abrahams 3/45 (10 overs)		Ruan Terblanche 53 (83); Basheeru-Deen Walters 3/46 (7.1 overs)

Eastern Province won by 25 runs
St George's Park, Port Elizabeth
Umpires: Abongile Sodumo and Dawood Arkeldien

- Eastern Province won the toss and elected to bat.
- Ruan Terblanche (Boland) made his List A debut.

24 November 2019
Scorecard

KwaZulu-Natal Inland; 275/6 (50 overs)	v	Free State; 216 (41.1 overs)
Grant Roelofsen 128* (131); Duan Jansen 2/33 (8 overs)		Andries Gous 83 (65); Lwandiswa Zuma 5/50 (10 overs)

KwaZulu-Natal Inland won by 59 runs
Mangaung Oval, Bloemfontein
Umpires: Thomas Mokorosi and Marlon Jansen

- Free State won the toss and elected to field.

24 November 2019
Scorecard

Border; 215 (45.1 overs)	v	Northern Cape; 216/4 (41.1 overs)
Bradley Williams 60 (75); Kagiso Mohale 4/56 (10 overs)		Keegan Petersen 89* (106); Bamanye Xenxe 3/52 (9.3 overs)

Northern Cape won by 6 wickets
Diamond Oval, Kimberley
Umpires: Rudi Birkenstock and Lauren Agenbag

- Border won the toss and elected to bat.
- Blake Schraader (Northern Cape) made his List A debut.

24 November 2019
Scorecard

KwaZulu-Natal; 235/8 (50 overs)	v	North West; 163 (38.4 overs)
Eben Botha 76 (93); Khalipha Cele 3/39 (10 overs)		Michael Erlank 39 (48); Brady Barends 2/19 (5 overs)

North West won by 72 runs
Kingsmead, Durban
Umpires: Gladman Gaseba and Mazizi Gampu

- KwaZulu-Natal won the toss and elected to field.
- Kevin Crowie (North West) made his List A debut.

=== December 2019 ===
1 December 2019
Scorecard

Northern Cape; 270/7 (50 overs)	v	Western Province; 247 (48.2 overs)
Blake Schraader 65* (60); Mthiwekhaya Nabe 2/51 (7 overs)		Zubayr Hamza 85 (87); Aubrey Swanepoel 3/52 (10 overs)

Northern Cape won by 23 runs
Diamond Oval, Kimberley
Umpires: Gawie Botha and Ryan Hendricks

- Northern Cape won the toss and elected to bat.

15 December 2019
Scorecard

KwaZulu-Natal	v	Free State

Match abandoned
Kingsmead, Durban
Umpires: Sinethemba Mjekula and Abdoellah Steenkamp

- No toss.
- No play was possible due to rain.

15 December 2019
Scorecard

KwaZulu-Natal Inland	v	Northern Cape

Match abandoned
City Oval, Pietermaritzburg
Umpires: Kevin Lawrence and Dawood Arkeldien

- No toss.
- No play was possible due to rain.

15 December 2019
Scorecard

Gauteng; 204 (48.3 overs)	v	Northerns; 208/4 (39.4 overs)
Shaylen Pillay 113 (107); Gionne Koopman 3/31 (10 overs)		Victor Mahlangu 100 (125); Tshepang Dithole 2/36 (8 overs)

Northerns won by 6 wickets
New Wanderers Stadium, Johannesburg
Umpires: Jan Erasmus and Mazizi Gampu

- Northerns won the toss and elected to field.

22 December 2019
Scorecard

Eastern Province; 220 (44.1 overs)	v	Free State; 223/5 (45.2 overs)
Lesiba Ngoepe 72 (62); Johan van Dyk 3/28 (7 overs)		Karabo Mogotsi 84 (120); Tian Koekemoer 2/25 (10 overs)

Free State won by 5 wickets
St George's Park, Port Elizabeth
Umpires: Lubabalo Gcuma and Philip Vosloo

- Free State won the toss and elected to field.
- Philip Visser (Free State) made his List A debut.

22 December 2019
Scorecard

KwaZulu-Natal; 251/7 (50 overs)	v	Western Province; 252/3 (48.4 overs)
Bradley Porteous 66 (53); Jesse Christensen 3/30 (10 overs)		Tayo Walbrugh 92 (89); Andile Mokgakane 1/33 (3 overs)

Western Province won by 7 wickets
Ed Fivaz Oval, Durbanville
Umpires: Thomas Mokorosi and Ryan Hendricks

- KwaZulu-Natal won the toss and elected to bat.
- Josh Breed and David Schierhout (Western Province) both made their List A debuts.

=== January 2020 ===
12 January 2020
Scorecard

Easterns; 289 (49.4 overs)	v	Boland; 218 (46.1 overs)
Andrea Agathangelou 100 (107); Nkululeko Serame 5/60 (9.4 overs)		Warwick Abrahim 80 (86); Khwezi Gumede 5/48 (9 overs)

Easterns won by 71 runs
Boland Park, Paarl
Umpires: Rudi Birkenstock and Ryan Hendricks

- Boland won the toss and elected to field.

19 January 2020
Scorecard

Boland	v	KwaZulu-Natal Inland

Match abandoned
Boland Park, Paarl
Umpires: Thomas Mokorosi and Clifford Isaacs

- No toss.
- No play was possible due to rain.

19 January 2020
Scorecard

South Western Districts	v	Eastern Province

Match abandoned
Recreation Ground, Oudtshoorn
Umpires: Abongile Sodumo and Stephen Rex

- No toss.
- No play was possible due to rain.

19 January 2020
Scorecard

Easterns; 215 (46.4 overs)	v	Gauteng; 220/7 (40.1 overs)
Wesley Coulentianos 65 (124); Codi Yusuf 4/36 (8.4 overs)		Ryan Rickelton 91 (85); Dyllan Matthews 4/65 (9.1 overs)

Gauteng won by 3 wickets
New Wanderers Stadium, Johannesburg

- Gauteng won the toss and elected to field.
- Sebastian de Oliveira (Gauteng) made his List A debut.

19 January 2020
Scorecard

Border; 128 (37 overs)	v	Northerns; 129/2 (17.5 overs)
Jason Niemand 25 (42); Kyle Simmonds 2/2 (3 overs)		Jonathan Vandiar 54* (35); Joshua Dodd 2/21 (5 overs)

Northerns won by 8 wickets
Tshwane University of Technology Oval, Pretoria
Umpires: Lauren Agenbag and Murray Brown

- Northerns won the toss and elected to field.
- Nonelela Yikha (Border) made his List A debut.

26 January 2020
Scorecard

Western Province; 223/8 (50 overs)	v	South Western Districts; 224/4 (41.4 overs)
Justin Dill 41* (43); Heath Richards 3/20 (4 overs)		Jean du Plessis 88* (103); Mihlali Mpongwana 2/53 (10 overs)

South Western Districts won by 6 wickets
Newlands, Cape Town
Umpires: Siphelele Gasa and Dennis Smith

- South Western Districts won the toss and elected to field.
- Jhedli van Briesies (South Western Districts) made his List A debut.

26 January 2020
Scorecard

KwaZulu-Natal Inland; 275/4 (50 overs)	v	North West; 144/6 (22 overs)
Kyle Nipper 118* (102); Johannes Diseko 2/26 (10 overs)		Lesego Senokwane 32 (38); Andile Simelane 3/30 (4 overs)

KwaZulu-Natal Inland won by 2 runs (DLS method)
City Oval, Pietermaritzburg
Umpires: Rudi Birkenstock and Murray Brown

- KwaZulu-Natal Inland won the toss and elected to bat.
- Andile Simelane (KwaZulu-Natal Inland) and Jordan Morris (North West) both made their List A debuts.

=== February 2020 ===
2 February 2020
Scorecard

Gauteng; 195 (46.5 overs)	v	Eastern Province; 116 (35 overs)
Dominic Hendricks 39 (60); Basheeru-Deen Walters 2/24 (8.5 overs)		Jade de Klerk 31 (62); Codi Yusuf 3/16 (3.4 overs)

Gauteng won by 79 runs
St George's Park, Port Elizabeth
Umpires: Gladman Gaseba and Thomas Mokorosi

- Gauteng won the toss and elected to bat.

2 February 2020
Scorecard

Border	v	Boland

Match abandoned
Buffalo Park, East London
Umpires: Stephen Rex and Jurie Sadler

- No toss.
- No play was possible due to rain.

2 February 2020
Scorecard

KwaZulu-Natal Inland; 151 (33.3 overs)	v	Northerns; 155/2 (23.3 overs)
Tyron Koen 38* (48); Gionne Koopman 3/44 (6.3 overs)		Rubin Hermann 82* (74); Lwandiswa Zuma 1/27 (6 overs)

Northerns won by 8 wickets
Tshwane University of Technology Oval, Pretoria
Umpires: Marlon Jansen and Ryan Hendricks

- KwaZulu-Natal Inland won the toss and elected to bat.

9 February 2020
Scorecard

North West; 153 (46.1 overs)	v	South Western Districts; 130 (45.1 overs)
Jordan Morris 45 (62); Brendon Louw 3/15 (7 overs)		Niel Hornbuckle 44 (78); Katleho Leokaoke 3/17 (10 overs)

North West won by 23 runs
Recreation Ground, Oudtshoorn
Umpires: Siphelele Gasa and Abongile Sodumo

- South Western Districts won the toss and elected to field.
- Rayyaan Rhode (North West) made his List A debut.

16 February 2020
Scorecard

KwaZulu-Natal; 284/8 (50 overs)	v	Boland; 283 (49.5 overs)
Thamsanqa Khumalo 61 (56); Reeve Cyster 2/41 (10 overs)		Isma-eel Gafieldien 103* (120); Keith Dudgeon 3/47 (9.5 overs)

KwaZulu-Natal won by 1 runs
Boland Park, Paarl
Umpires: Ryan Hendricks and Sinethemba Mjekula

- KwaZulu-Natal won the toss and elected to bat.
- David Rushmere, Ben Ward (Boland) and Ruan Cronje (KwaZulu-Natal) all made their List A debuts.

16 February 2020
Scorecard

Border; 159 (38.3 overs)	v	South Western Districts; 92/1 (16.5 overs)
Jason Niemand 77 (94); Tsepo Ndwandwa 4/37 (10 overs)		Niel Hornbuckle 37* (48); Joshua Dodd 1/18 (3.3 overs)

South Western Districts won by 9 wickets (DLS method)
Recreation Ground, Oudtshoorn
Umpires: Stephen Rex and Jurie Sadler

- South Western Districts won the toss and elected to field.
- Stuart Els and Jason Raubenheimer (Border) both made their List A debuts.

16 February 2020
Scorecard

KwaZulu-Natal Inland; 246/8 (50 overs)	v	Eastern Province; 202 (48.5 overs)
Cody Chetty 64 (68); Basheeru-Deen Walters 3/28 (7 overs)		Tian Koekemoer 62 (77); Nduduzo Mfoza 4/35 (10 overs)

KwaZulu-Natal Inland by 44 runs
City Oval, Pietermaritzburg
Umpires: Kevin Lawrence and Mazizi Gampu

- Eastern Province won the toss and elected to field.
- Tristan Stubbs (Eastern Province) made his List A debut.

16 February 2020
Scorecard

Gauteng; 230 (48 overs)	v	Western Province; 232/3 (48.5 overs)
Bryce Parsons 59 (66); Andre Malan 4/35 (10 overs)		Zac Elkin 96 (158); Tumelo Tlhokwe 1/39 (10 overs)

Western Province won by 7 wickets
Newlands, Cape Town
Umpires: Gawie Botha and Abdoellah Steenkamp

- Gauteng won the toss and elected to bat.
- Bryce Parsons (Gauteng) made his List A debut.

23 February 2020
Scorecard

Free State	v	Easterns

Match abandoned
University of Free State Ground, Bloemfontein
Umpires: Jan Erasmus and Mazizi Gampu

- No toss.
- No play was possible due to rain.

23 February 2020
Scorecard

Northerns; 221 (46.2 overs)	v	North West; 222/3 (43.3 overs)
Rubin Hermann 102 (133); Johannes Diseko 3/54 (10 overs)		Lesego Senokwane 74 (97); Diego Rosier 1/10 (2 overs)

North West won by 7 wickets
Tshwane University of Technology Oval, Pretoria
Umpires: Gawie Botha and Abongile Sodumo

- North West won the toss and elected to field.

=== March 2020 ===
1 March 2020
Scorecard

KwaZulu-Natal; 297/6 (50 overs)	v	Border; 142 (34.2 overs)
Bradley Porteous 64 (61); Nonelela Yikha 3/55 (9 overs)		Jason Niemand 34 (66); Zakhele Qwabe 3/36 (10 overs)

KwaZulu-Natal won by 155 runs
Buffalo Park, East London
Umpires: Rudi Birkenstock and Bongani Ntshebe

- Border won the toss and elected to field.

7 March 2020
Scorecard

Border; 277/7 (50 overs)	v	KwaZulu-Natal Inland; 240 (48.5 overs)
Bradley Williams 66 (83); Sohail Mahmoud 3/46 (8 overs)		Sohail Mahmoud 93 (103); Joshua Dodd 3/59 (8 overs)

Border won by 37 runs
City Oval, Pietermaritzburg
Umpires: Mazizi Gampu and Gladman Gaseba

- KwaZulu-Natal Inland won the toss and elected to field.
- Mondli Khumalo (KwaZulu-Natal Inland) and Mathew Fourie (Border) both made their List A debuts.

8 March 2020
Scorecard

Eastern Province; 145 (38.1 overs)	v	Boland; 97 (26.5 overs)
Tristan Stubbs 82 (99); Ziyaad Abrahams 3/18 (10 overs)		Reeve Cyster 22 (47); Sithembile Langa 3/41 (9 overs)

Eastern Province won by 48 runs
Boland Park, Paarl
Umpires: Stephen Rex and Marlon Jansen

- Eastern Province won the toss and elected to bat.

8 March 2020
Scorecard

South Western Districts; 77 (26.2 overs)	v	Northern Cape; 79/7 (22.2 overs)
Niel Hornbuckle 24 (38); Aubrey Swanepoel 3/2 (2.2 overs)		Ernest Kemm 24* (59); Ndumiso Mvelase 3/6 (2 overs)

Northern Cape won by 3 wickets
Diamond Oval, Kimberley
Umpires: Jan Erasmus and Jurie Sadler

- South Western Districts won the toss and elected to bat.
- Gert Cloete (Northern Cape) made his List A debut.

8 March 2020
Scorecard

Northerns; 349/6 (50 overs)	v	Easterns; 273 (46.1 overs)
Ruan de Swardt 112* (90); Clayton August 1/47 (7 overs)		Andrea Agathangelou 61 (64); Tshepo Moreki 3/35 (6 overs)

Northerns won by 76 runs
Tshwane University of Technology Oval, Pretoria
Umpires: Abongile Sodumo and Godwin Von Willingh

- Northerns won the toss and elected to bat.

14 March 2020
Scorecard

Western Province; 136 (36.5 overs)	v	Eastern Province; 140/3 (27 overs)
Qaasim Adams 33 (50); Basheeru-Deen Walters 5/29 (9 overs)		Sihle Magongoma 53 (85); Andre Malan 1/21 (5 overs)

Eastern Province won by 7 wickets
St George's Park, Port Elizabeth
Umpires: Thomas Mokorosi and Clifford Isaacs

- Eastern Province won the toss and elected to field.

15 March 2020
Scorecard

Free State; 172/9 (50 overs)	v	Northern Cape; 106 (26 overs)
Karabo Mogotsi 52 (95); Gert Cloete 4/29 (10 overs)		Aubrey Swanepoel 40 (68); Nealan van Heerden 3/26 (7 overs)

Free State won by 66 runs
University of Free State Ground, Bloemfontein
Umpires: Jurie Sadler and Abdoellah Steenkamp

- Northern Cape won the toss and elected to field.

15 March 2020
Scorecard

Gauteng; 258/7 (50 overs)	v	North West; 254/7 (50 overs)
Mitchell Van Buuren 92 (108); Jon Hinrichsen 2/28 (9 overs)		Lesego Senokwane 100 (117); Tumelo Tlhokwe 2/37 (10 overs)

Gauteng won by 4 runs
New Wanderers Stadium, Johannesburg
Umpires: Arno Jacobs and Ryan Hendricks

- North West won the toss and elected to field.

15 March 2020
Scorecard

South Western Districts; 148 (37.2 overs)	v	Easterns; 118 (39.1 overs)
Niel Hornbuckle 22 (33); Armand Erasmus 5/31 (10 overs)		Wesley Coulentianos 59 (93); Hershell America 3/26 (6 overs)

South Western Districts won by 30 runs
Willowmoore Park, Benoni
Umpires: Mazizi Gampu Murray Brown

- Easterns won the toss and elected to field.

15 March 2020
Scorecard

KwaZulu-Natal; 159 (41.5 overs)	v	KwaZulu-Natal Inland; 159 (46.2 overs)
Sibonelo Makhanya 59 (90); Sohail Mahmoud 3/31 (7.5 overs)		Kyle Nipper 62 (77); Keith Dudgeon 7/35 (10 overs)

Match tied
Kingsmead, Durban
Umpires: Dennis Smith and Abongile Sodumo

- KwaZulu-Natal won the toss and elected to bat.
- Mpho Ndumo (KwaZulu-Natal Inland) made his List A debut.

22 March 2020
Scorecard

North West	v	Free State

Senwes Park, Potchefstroom

22 March 2020
Scorecard

Easterns	v	Northern Cape

Willowmoore Park, Benoni

22 March 2020
Scorecard

Western Province	v	Boland

Newlands, Cape Town

22 March 2020
Scorecard

Border	v	Gauteng

Buffalo Park, East London

22 March 2020
Scorecard

KwaZulu-Natal	v	Northerns

Kingsmead, Durban

== Final ==
29 March 2020
Scorecard

v
