= West Indies women's cricket team in South Africa in 2009–10 =

	South Africa	West Indies
- Dates: 14 – 28 October 2009
Captains	Sunette Loubser	Merissa Aguilleira

One Day International series
- Results: South Africa won the 4-match series 2–1
Most runs	Mignon du Preez (175)	Stafanie Taylor (221)
Most wickets	Dane van Niekerk (7)	Stacy-Ann King (3); Stafanie Taylor (3)
- Player of the series: Stafanie Taylor (WI)

Twenty20 International series
- Results: West Indies won the 3-match series 3–0
Most runs	Alicia Smith (66)	Deandra Dottin (90)
Most wickets	Ashlyn Kilowan (5)	Anisa Mohammed (6)
- Player of the series: Deandra Dottin (WI)

The West Indies women's cricket team toured South Africa in October 2009. They played against South Africa in 4 One Day Internationals and 3 Twenty20 Internationals, losing the ODI series 2–1 but winning the T20I series 3–0.

== Squads ==
South Africa	West Indies
Sunette Loubser (c); Cri-Zelda Brits; Trisha Chetty (wk); Mignon du Preez; Shandre Fritz; Shabnim Ismail; Marizanne Kapp; Ashlyn Kilowan; Marcia Letsoalo; Alicia Smith; Angelique Taai; Kirstie Thomson; Charlize van der Westhuizen; Dane van Niekerk	Merissa Aguilleira (c) (wk); Shemaine Campbelle; Britney Cooper; Shanel Daley; Deandra Dottin; Cordel Jack; Stacy-Ann King; Pamela Lavine; Anisa Mohammed; Chedean Nation; Amanda Samaroo; Shakera Selman; Tremayne Smartt; Stafanie Taylor

== Tour Match: Western Province v West Indies ==
14 October 2009
Scorecard

West Indies; 214/9 (50 overs)	v	Western Province; 149/9 (50 overs)
Stafanie Taylor 62* (38); Mereca Mackier 2/15 (10 overs)		Olivia Anderson 40 (89); Deandra Dottin 2/13 (5 overs)

West Indies Women won by 65 runs
Van der Stel Cricket Club, Stellenbosch
Umpires: Adrian Holdstock (SA) and Clifford Isaacs (SA)

- Western Province Women won the toss and elected to field.

== WODI Series ==
=== 1st ODI ===
16 October 2009
Scorecard

South Africa; 181/7 (50 overs)	v	West Indies; 182/5 (41.3 overs)
Cri-Zelda Brits 48 (83); Cordel Jack 1/28 (10 overs)		Stafanie Taylor 108* (117); Alicia Smith 2/37 (7.3 overs)

West Indies Women won by 5 wickets
Boland Park, Paarl
Umpires: Clifford Isaacs (SA) and Irvin van Kerwel (SA)
Player of the match: Stafanie Taylor (WI)

- West Indies Women won the toss and elected to field.
- Kirstie Thomson (SA) and Amanda Samaroo (WI) both made their WODI debuts.

=== 2nd ODI ===
18 October 2009
Scorecard

West Indies; 182/9 (50 overs)	v	South Africa; 186/3 (40.5 overs)
Pamela Lavine 44 (33); Dane van Niekerk 3/25 (10 overs)		Mignon du Preez 68* (80); Pamela Lavine 1/16 (2 overs)

South Africa Women won by 7 wickets
Newlands Cricket Ground, Cape Town
Umpires: Adrian Holdstock (SA) and Irvin van Kerwel (SA)
Player of the match: Mignon du Preez (SA)

- South Africa Women won the toss and elected to field.

=== 3rd ODI ===
21 October 2009
Scorecard

West Indies; 160 (49.1 overs)	v	South Africa; 163/3 (40.4 overs)
Stafanie Taylor 66 (73); Shandre Fritz 3/11 (5.1 overs)		Cri-Zelda Brits 60* (105); Stacy-Ann King 1/6 (5 overs)

South Africa Women won by 7 wickets
Boland Park, Paarl
Umpires: Adrian Holdstock (SA) and Clifford Isaacs (SA)
Player of the match: Cri-Zelda Brits (SA)

- South Africa Women won the toss and elected to field.
- Shemaine Campbelle and Britney Cooper (WI) made their WODI debuts.

=== 4th ODI ===
23 October 2009
Scorecard

South Africa; 180/6 (50 overs)	v	West Indies; 180/8 (50 overs)
Mignon du Preez 70* (110); Shemaine Campbelle 2/22 (10 overs)		Merissa Aguilleira 36 (78); Alicia Smith 2/13 (6 overs)

Match Tied
Newlands Cricket Ground, Cape Town
Umpires: Adrian Holdstock (SA) and Irvin van Kerwel (SA)
Player of the match: Mignon du Preez (SA)

- West Indies Women won the toss and elected to field.
- Tremayne Smartt (WI) made her WODI debut.

== WT20I Series ==
=== 1st T20I ===
25 October 2009
Scorecard

South Africa; 93/8 (20 overs)	v	West Indies; 94/4 (12.3 overs)
Alicia Smith 22* (19); Shemaine Campbelle 3/7 (4 overs)		Deandra Dottin 26 (11); Charlize van der Westhuizen 2/27 (4 overs)

West Indies Women won by 6 wickets
Boland Park, Paarl
Umpires: Clifford Isaacs (SA) and Irvin van Kerwel (SA)
Player of the match: Shemaine Campbelle (WI)

- West Indies Women won the toss and elected to field.
- Angelique Taai, Kirstie Thomson (SA), Shemaine Campbelle, Britney Cooper and Tremayne Smartt (WI) all made their WT20I debuts.

=== 2nd T20I ===
26 October 2009
Scorecard

West Indies; 114/9 (20 overs)	v	South Africa; 101 (19.2 overs)
Cordel Jack 41 (43); Ashlyn Kilowan 2/16 (3 overs)		Shandre Fritz 42 (35); Anisa Mohammed 5/10 (4 overs)

West Indies Women won by 13 runs
Newlands Cricket Ground, Cape Town
Umpires: Adrian Holdstock (SA) and Irvin van Kerwel (SA)
Player of the match: Anisa Mohammed (WI)

- South Africa Women won the toss and elected to field.

=== 3rd T20I ===
28 October 2009
Scorecard

West Indies; 97 (19.2 overs)	v	South Africa; 95/6 (20 overs)
Deandra Dottin 52 (36); Ashlyn Kilowan 3/20 (3.2 overs)		Alicia Smith 44 (47); Chedean Nation 2/14 (4 overs)

West Indies Women won by 2 runs
Boland Park, Paarl
Umpires: Adrian Holdstock (SA) and Clifford Isaacs (SA)
Player of the match: Deandra Dottin (WI)

- South Africa Women won the toss and elected to field.
- Amanda Samaroo (WI) made her WT20I debut.
