= 2010 ICC Women's Cricket Challenge =

- Dates: 6 – 16 October 2010
- Administrator: International Cricket Council
- Cricket format: ODI, T20I
- Tournament format(s): Round-robin (ODIs); Group stage and final (T20Is)
- Host: South Africa
- Champions: South Africa (ODIs); West Indies (T20Is)
- Participants: 6
- Matches: 15 ODIs; 9 T20Is
- Most runs: (Cricket West Indies) Stafanie Taylor 390 (ODIs) (South Africa) Shandre Fritz 145 (T20Is)
- Most wickets: (South Africa) Sunette Loubser 13 (ODIs) (Ireland) Laura Delany 5 (T20Is) (Cricket West Indies) Anisa Mohammed 5 (T20Is)

The 2010 ICC Women's Cricket Challenge was an international women's cricket tournament held in South Africa during the 2010–11 international season. South Africa, West Indies, Pakistan, Sri Lanka, Netherlands and Ireland took part in the tournament, held in Potchefstroom from 6 to 16 October 2010. The six teams competed in a series of One Day Internationals (ODIs) and Twenty20s (T20Is).

South Africa remained unbeaten in the ODI tournament to win the competition, and rise two positions to fifth in the Women's ODI rankings. The West Indies' Stafanie Taylor finished as the tournament's top scorer, accumulating 390 runs, including the only century of the competition. Sunette Loubser of South Africa claimed the most wickets, taking 13.

== One Day International tournament ==
=== Group stage ===
Team	Pld	W	L	NR	Pts	NRR
South Africa	5	5	0	0	10	+2.104
West Indies	5	4	1	0	8	+1.919
Sri Lanka	5	3	2	0	6	−0.597
Pakistan	5	2	3	0	4	−0.396
Ireland	5	1	4	0	2	−1.019
Netherlands	5	0	5	0	0	−2.184
Source:International Cricket Council.

6 October
Scorecard

Pakistan; 117/3 (32.4 overs)	v	Ireland; 116 (31.5 overs)
Nain Abidi 50* (85); Jill Whelan 1/9 (4 overs)		Jill Whelan 18 (24); Asmavia Iqbal 3/17 (9 overs)

Pakistan won by 7 wickets
Absa Puk Oval, Potchefstroom
Umpires: PA Makagamatha and P Vosloo
Player of the match: Nain Abidi (Pak)

- Pakistan won the toss and elected to field

6 October
Scorecard

West Indies; 283/6 (50 overs)	v	Netherlands; 135/8 (50 overs)
Stafanie Taylor 147 (141); Mariska Kornet 2/61 (10 overs)		Esther Lanser 39 (92); Deandra Dottin 2/15 (7 overs)

West Indies won by 148 runs
Witrand Cricket Field, Potchefstroom
Umpires: M Kotze and B Mantle
Player of the match: Stafanie Taylor (WI)

- Netherlands won the toss and elected to field

6 October
Scorecard

South Africa; 228/8 (50 overs)	v	Sri Lanka; 75 (24.3 overs)
Cri-Zelda Brits 78 (108); Chamari Polgampola 3/41 (10 overs)		Chamari Polgampola 25 (35); Sunette Loubser 4/11 (4.3 overs)

South Africa won by 153 runs
North West University No 2 Ground, Potchefstroom
Umpires: F Samsoodien and Robin White
Player of the match: Cri-Zelda Brits (SA)

- South Africa won the toss and elected to bat

7 October
Scorecard

West Indies; 275/6 (50 overs)	v	Ireland; 110 (41 overs)
Stafanie Taylor 72 (94); Ciara Metcalfe 1/42 (10 overs)		Cecelia Joyce 36 (69); Shanel Daley 4/29 (10 overs)

West Indies won by 165 runs
North West University No 2 Ground, Potchefstroom
Umpires: M Kotze and F Samsoodien
Player of the match: Stafanie Taylor (WI)

- West Indies won the toss and elected to bat

7 October
Scorecard

Sri Lanka; 245/8 (50 overs)	v	Netherlands; 195/8 (50 overs)
Suwini de Alwis 73 (65); Esther Lanser 2/35 (10 overs)		Helmien Rambaldo 67 (98); Shashikala Siriwardene 3/25 (10 overs)

Sri Lanka won by 50 runs
Absa Puk Oval, Potchefstroom
Umpires: B Mantle and P Vosloo
Player of the match: Suwini de Alwis (SL)

- Sri Lanka won the toss and elected to bat

7 October
Scorecard

Pakistan; 123 (40.3 overs)	v	South Africa; 127/3 (30.1 overs)
Nain Abidi 30 (55); Sunette Loubser 3/19 (10 overs)		Trisha Chetty 60 (84); Nida Dar 1/9 (2 overs)

South Africa won by 7 wickets
Witrand Cricket Field, Potchefstroom
Umpires: PA Makagamatha and Robin White
Player of the match: Trisha Chetty (SA)

- South Africa won the toss and elected to field

9 October
Scorecard

Pakistan; 258/9 (50 overs)	v	Netherlands; 213 (45 overs)
Bismah Maroof 52 (80); Esther de Lange 4/43 (10 overs)		Esther Lanser 75 (116); Sana Mir 5/32 (9 overs)

Pakistan won by 45 runs
North West University No 2 Ground, Potchefstroom
Umpires: Marius Kotze and Phaka Makagamatha
Player of the match: Esther Lanser (Net)

- Pakistan won the toss and elected to field

9 October
Scorecard

Ireland; 162/6 (50 overs)	v	South Africa; 163/2 (34.2 overs)
Laura Delany 40 (83); Marcia Letsoalo 1/12 (10 overs)		Mignon du Preez 66 (86); Amy Kenealy 1/21 (3 overs)

South Africa won by 8 wickets
Witrand Cricket Field, Potchefstroom
Umpires: Brian Mantle and Phillip Vosloo
Player of the match: Mignon du Preez (SA)

- Ireland won the toss and elected to bat

9 October
Scorecard

Sri Lanka; 165 (48.3 overs)	v	West Indies; 166/1 (28.4 overs)
Dilani Manodara 29* (69); Anisa Mohammed 4/26 (10 overs)		Stafanie Taylor 68* (80); Shashikala Siriwardene 1/47 (8 overs)

West Indies won by 9 wickets
Absa Puk Oval, Potchefstroom
Umpires: Faizel Samsoodien and Robin White
Player of the match: Anisa Mohammed (WI)

- Sri Lanka won the toss and elected to bat

10 October
Scorecard

Netherlands; 172 (48.2 overs)	v	Ireland; 175/2 (28.2 overs)
Marijn Nijman 43 (72); Eimear Richardson 3/26 (10 overs)		Cecelia Joyce 78* (84); Annemarie Tanke 1/34 (4.2 overs)

Ireland won by 8 wickets
Absa Puk Oval, Potchefstroom
Umpires: Marius Kotze and Faizel Samsoodien
Player of the match: Isobel Joyce (Ire)

- Netherlands won the toss and elected to bat

10 October
Scorecard

Sri Lanka; 220/6 (50 overs)	v	Pakistan; 189 (45.5 overs)
Shashikala Siriwardene 67* (78); Shumaila Qureshi 2/33 (9 overs)		Nain Abidi 54 (92); Shashikala Siriwardene 3/31 (8.5 overs)

Sri Lanka won by 31 runs
Witrand Cricket Field, Potchefstroom
Umpires: Phillip Vosloo and Robin White
Player of the match: Shashikala Siriwardene (SL)

- Pakistan won the toss and elected to field

10 October
Scorecard

West Indies; 161 (46.3 overs)	v	South Africa; 162/4 (39.2 overs)
Stacy-Ann King 38 (67); Sunette Loubser 2/19 (10 overs)		Shandre Fritz 43 (70); Cordel Jack 1/17 (5 overs)

South Africa won by 6 wickets
North West University No 2 Ground, Potchefstroom
Umpires: Phaka Makagamatha and Brian Mantle
Player of the match: Sunette Loubser (SA)

- West Indies won the toss and elected to bat

12 October
Scorecard

Ireland; 211/8 (50 overs)	v	Sri Lanka; 212/8 (46 overs)
Clare Shillington 78 (110); Hiruka Fernando 2/15 (3 overs)		Sandamali Dolawatta 74 (112); Laura Delany 3/30 (10 overs)

Sri Lanka won by 2 wickets
Witrand Cricket Field, Potchefstroom
Umpires: Brian Mantle and Robin White
Player of the match: Sandamali Dolawatta (SL)

- Ireland won the toss and elected to bat

12 October
Scorecard

West Indies; 256/8 (50 overs)	v	Pakistan; 163 (44.2 overs)
Stafanie Taylor 83 (112); Asmavia Iqbal 2/28 (7 overs)		Sana Mir 39 (98); Shanel Daley 2/25 (10 overs)

West Indies won by 93 runs
Witrand Cricket Field, Potchefstroom
Umpires: Phaka Makagamatha and Phillip Vosloo
Player of the match: Stafanie Taylor (WI)

- Pakistan won the toss and elected to field

12 October
Scorecard

Netherlands; 109/9 (50 overs)	v	South Africa; 113/0 (17.4 overs)
Marijn Nijman 21 (38); Sunette Loubser 3/27 (10 overs)		Shandre Fritz 61* (59)

South Africa won by 10 wickets
North West University No 2 Ground, Potchefstroom
Umpires: Marius Kotze and Faizel Samsoodien
Player of the match: Shandre Fritz (SA)

- South Africa won the toss and elected to field

== Twenty20 International tournament ==
=== Group stage ===
==== Group A ====
Team	Pld	W	L	NR	Pts	NRR
West Indies	2	2	0	0	4	+3.178
South Africa	2	1	1	0	2	+2.389
Netherlands	2	0	2	0	0	−5.350

14 October
Scorecard

South Africa; 98 (19.5 overs)	v	West Indies; 101/4 (16.5 overs)
Trisha Chetty 43 (47); Stacy-Ann King 3/19 (4 overs)		Juliana Nero 39 (44); Shabnim Ismail 1/18 (3.5 overs)

West Indies won by 6 wickets
Absa Puk Oval, Potchefstroom
Umpires: Phaka Makagamatha and Faizel Samsoodien
Player of the match: Stacy-Ann King (WI)

- West Indies won the toss and elected to field

14 October
Scorecard

South Africa; 205/1 (20 overs)	v	Netherlands; 90/7 (20 overs)
Shandre Fritz 116* (71)		Violet Wattenberg 22 (23); Jana Nell 2/12 (4 overs)

South Africa won by 115 runs
Absa Puk Oval, Potchefstroom
Umpires: Marius Kotze and Phillip Vosloo
Player of the match: Shandre Fritz (SA)

- South Africa won the toss and elected to bat

16 October
Scorecard

West Indies; 191/4 (20 overs)	v	Netherlands; 92 (19.5 overs)
Stacy-Ann King 81 (47); Denise Hannema 1/17 (3 overs)		Carlijn de Groot 23 (31); Anisa Mohammed 2/11 (3 overs)

West Indies won by 99 runs
Absa Puk Oval, Potchefstroom
Umpires: Faizel Samsoodien and Robin White
Player of the match: Stacy-Ann King (WI)

- West Indies won the toss and elected to bat

==== Group B ====
Team	Pld	W	L	NR	Pts	NRR
Sri Lanka	2	2	0	0	4	+1.129
Pakistan	2	1	1	0	2	−0.654
Ireland	2	0	2	0	0	−0.400

14 October
Scorecard

Pakistan; 80 (19.3 overs)	v	Sri Lanka; 94/2 (15.0 overs)
Marina Iqbal 16 (14); Eshani Kaushalya 2/17 (4 overs)		Inoka Galagedara 42*; Shumaila Qureshi 1/20 (4 overs)

Sri Lanka won by 8 wickets
North West University No 2 Ground, Potchefstroom
Umpires: Marius Kotze and Brian Mantle
Player of the match: Inoka Galagedara (SL)

- Sri Lanka won the toss and elected to field

14 October
Scorecard

Sri Lanka; 127/6 (20 overs)	v	Ireland; 116/7 (20 overs)
Inoka Galagedara 28 (23); Laura Delany 2/16 (3 overs)		Isobel Joyce 37 (27); Suwini de Alwis 2/21 (4 overs)

Sri Lanka won by 11 runs
North West University No 2 Ground, Potchefstroom
Umpires: Brian Mantle and Robin White
Player of the match: Isobel Joyce (Ire)

- Sri Lanka won the toss and elected to bat

16 October
Scorecard

Pakistan; 111/6 (20 overs)	v	Ireland; 106/7 (20 overs)
Nain Abidi 39 (50); Laura Delany 2/16 (4 overs)		Kim Garth 20 (22); Nida Dar 2/9 (4 overs)

Pakistan won by 5 runs
North West University No 2 Ground, Potchefstroom
Umpires: Phaka Makagamatha and Phillip Vosloo
Player of the match: Nida Dar (Pak)

- Ireland won the toss and elected to field

=== Knock-out stage ===
==== Fifth-place play-off ====
16 October
Scorecard

Ireland; 179/5 (20 overs)	v	Netherlands; 137/4 (20 overs)
Nikki Symmons 86 (55); Marloes Braat 1/28 (4 overs)		Miranda Veringmeier 60 (48); Cecelia Joyce 1/6 (2 overs)

Ireland won by 42 runs
Witrand Cricket Field, Potchefstroom
Umpires: Phaka Makagamatha and Faizel Samsoodien
Player of the match: Nikki Symmons (Ire)

- Ireland won the toss and elected to bat

==== Third-place play-off ====
16 October
Scorecard

Pakistan; 93/8 (20 overs)	v	South Africa; 94/4 (19 overs)
Javeria Khan 34 (31); Angelique Taai 3/9 (3.3 overs)		Cri-zelda Brits 38* (47); Nida Dar 2/15 (4 overs)

South Africa won by 6 wickets
North West University No 2 Ground, Potchefstroom
Umpires: Phillip Vosloo and Robin White
Player of the match: Angelique Taai (SA)

- Pakistan won the toss and elected to bat

==== Final ====
16 October
Scorecard

Sri Lanka; 83/9 (20 overs)	v	West Indies; 85/2 (10.4 overs)
Chamari Polgampola 20 (22); Tremayne Smartt 1/6 (2 overs)		Deandra Dottin 39 (22); Shashikala Siriwardene 1/15 (2 overs)

West Indies won by 8 wickets
Absa Puk Oval, Potchefstroom
Umpires: Marius Kotze and Brian Mantle
Player of the match: Deandra Dottin (WI)

- Sri Lanka won the toss and elected to bat
