= Taai =

Taai or Taʻai is a surname. Notable people with the surname include:

- Angelique Taai (born 1987), South African cricketer and coach
- Ukuma Taʻai (born 1987), Tongan rugby league footballer
