= 2015–16 CSA Provincial One-Day Challenge =

- Dates: 11 October 2015 – 9 April 2016
- Administrator: Cricket South Africa
- Cricket format: List A
- Tournament format: Round-robin
- Champions: (South Africa) Gauteng (2nd title)
- Participants: 14
- Most runs: Janneman Malan (279)
- Most wickets: Solo Nqweni (12)

The 2015–16 CSA Provincial One-Day Challenge was a List A cricket competition that took place in South Africa from 11 October 2015 to 9 April 2016. The competition was played between the thirteen South African provincial teams and Namibia.

North West finished top of Pool A and Gauteng finished top of Pool B, with both teams progressing to the final of the competition. The final was played at Senwes Park, Potchefstroom. Gauteng won the match, beating North West by 7 wickets.

== Points table ==
Pool A

Team	Pld	W	L	T	NR	Pts
(South Africa) North West	6	4	1	1	0	20
(South Africa) Western Province	6	3	1	1	1	19
(South Africa) South Western Districts	6	4	2	0	0	17
(South Africa) Northerns	6	3	3	0	0	15
(South Africa) Northern Cape	6	3	3	0	0	14
(South Africa) Border	6	1	3	0	2	8
(South Africa) KwaZulu-Natal	6	0	5	0	1	2

Team qualified for the final

Pool B

Team	Pld	W	L	T	NR	Pts
(South Africa) Gauteng	6	4	0	0	0	19
(South Africa) Eastern Province	6	4	0	0	0	19
(South Africa) KwaZulu-Natal Inland	6	3	3	0	0	15
(South Africa) Boland	6	3	3	0	0	14
Namibia	6	3	3	0	0	12
(South Africa) Free State	6	2	4	0	0	9
(South Africa) Easterns	6	2	4	0	0	8

Team qualified for the final

== Final ==
9 April 2017
Scorecard

(South Africa) North West; 224/8 (50.0 overs)	v	(South Africa) Gauteng; 230/3 (46.2 overs)
Richardt Frenz 44 (61); Matt McGillivray 3/27 (8 overs)		Karabo Mogotsi 61 (87); Andre Malan 2/20 (7 overs)

Gauteng won by 7 wickets
Senwes Park, Potchefstroom
Umpires: Ryan Hendricks and Jeff Wolhuter

- Gauteng won the toss and elected to bat.
- Findo Mdiza (North West) made his List A debut.
