= England women's cricket team in South Africa in 2011–12 =

English women's cricket team in South Africa in 2011
	South Africa	England
- Dates: 21 October 2011 – 30 October 2011
Captains	Cri-Zelda Brits (ODI); Mignon du Preez (T20I)	Charlotte Edwards

One Day International series
- Results: England won the 3-match series 3–0
Most runs	Trisha Chetty (141)	Lydia Greenway (210)
Most wickets	Shabnim Ismail (4)	Danielle Hazell (5)
- Player of the series: Lydia Greenway (Eng)

Twenty20 International series
- Results: England won the 3-match series 2–0
Most runs	Cri-Zelda Brits (86)	Sarah Taylor (89)
Most wickets	Masabata Klaas (2); Chloe Tryon (2)	Isa Guha (4)
- Player of the series: Sarah Taylor (Eng)

The England women's cricket team toured South Africa in October 2011, playing three One Day Internationals and three Twenty20 Internationals. England won the one-day series 3–0, and the Twenty20 series 2–0, with one match lost to rain.

== Squads ==
ODIs		T20Is	
South Africa	England	South Africa	England
Cri-zelda Brits (c); Mignon du Preez (v/c); Trisha Chetty (wk); Dinesha Devnarain; Shandre Fritz; Alison Hodgkinson; Shabnim Ismail; Marizanne Kapp; Masabata Klaas; Sunette Loubser; Dane van Niekerk; Kirstie Thomson; Chloe Tryon; Yolandi van der Westhuizen	Charlotte Edwards (c); Tammy Beaumont (wk); Arran Brindle; Katherine Brunt; Georgia Elwiss; Lydia Greenway; Isa Guha; Jenny Gunn; Danielle Hazell; Heather Knight; Laura Marsh; Sarah Taylor (wk); Danielle Wyatt	Mignon du Preez (c); Trisha Chetty (v/c) (wk); Cri-zelda Brits (c); Dinesha Devnarain; Alison Hodgkinson; Shabnim Ismail; Masabata Klaas; Sunette Loubser; Dane van Niekerk; Melissa Smook; Kirstie Thomson; Chloe Tryon; Yolandi van der Westhuizen	Charlotte Edwards (c); Tammy Beaumont (wk); Arran Brindle; Georgia Elwiss; Lydia Greenway; Isa Guha; Jenny Gunn; Danielle Hazell; Laura Marsh; Beth Morgan; Susie Rowe; Sarah Taylor (wk)

== One Day International series ==
=== 1st ODI ===
21 October 2011
Scorecard

England; 297/3 (50 overs)	v	South Africa; 235 (46.5 overs)
Lydia Greenway 125* (127); Marizanne Kapp 1/62 (9 overs)		Trisha Chetty 72 (100); Danielle Wyatt 2/15 (2 overs)

England won by 62 runs
Senwes Park, Potchefstroom
Umpires: Lubabalo Gcuma (SA) and Clifford Isaacs (SA)
Player of the match: Lydia Greenway (Eng)

- South Africa won the toss and elected to field.
- Chloe Tryon (SA) made her ODI debut.

=== 2nd ODI ===
23 October 2011
Scorecard

England; 315/6 (50 overs)	v	South Africa; 219 (47.3 overs)
Charlotte Edwards 138 (139); Shabnim Ismail 2/51 (10 overs)		Dane van Niekerk 44 (60); Arran Brindle 2/18 (5 overs)

England won by 96 runs
Senwes Park, Potchefstroom
Umpires: Roderick Ellis (SA) and Lubabalo Gcuma (SA)
Player of the match: Charlotte Edwards (Eng)

- South Africa won the toss and elected to field.
- Georgia Elwiss (Eng) made her ODI debut.

=== 3rd ODI ===
25 October 2011
scorecard

South Africa; 181/9 (50 overs)	v	England; 183/5 (43 overs)
Alison Hodgkinson 34 (49); Heather Knight 2/15 (4 overs)		Lydia Greenway 63 (90); Masabata Klaas 1/25 (6 overs)

England won by 5 wickets
Senwes Park, Potchefstroom
Umpires: Lubabalo Gcuma (SA) and Clifford Isaacs (SA)
Player of the match: Heather Knight (Eng)

- England won the toss and elected to field.

== Twenty20 International series ==
=== 1st T20I ===
27 October 2011
scorecard

South Africa; 128/6 (20 overs)	v	England; 131/3 (17.1 overs)
Alison Hodgkinson 51 (37); Isa Guha 2/30 (4 overs)		Sarah Taylor 50 (33); Chloe Tryon 1/18 (4 overs)

England won by 7 wickets
Senwes Park, Potchefstroom
Umpires: Lubabalo Gcuma (SA) and Clifford Isaacs (SA)
Player of the match: Sarah Taylor (Eng)

- South Africa won the toss and elected to bat.
- Alison Hodgkinson, Melissa Smook, Yolandi van der Westhuizen (SA) made their T20I debut.

=== 2nd T20I ===
29 October 2011
scorecard

South Africa; 110/8 (20 overs)	v	England; 15/0 (2.2 overs)
Cri-Zelda Brits 36 (36); Laura Marsh 3/19 (4 overs)		Charlotte Edwards 8* (8)

No result
Senwes Park, Potchefstroom
Umpires: Roderick Ellis (SA) and Clifford Isaacs (SA)

- South Africa won the toss and elected to bat.
- Rain stopped play in the second innings (England was batting at 15/0 after 2.2 overs).
- The match was abandoned due to inclement weather.

=== 3rd T20I ===
30 October 2011
scorecard

South Africa; 118/2 (20 overs)	v	England; 121/3 (15.5 overs)
Cri-Zelda Brits 50 (52); Jenny Gunn 1/22 (4 overs)		Sarah Taylor 39 (28); Masabata Klaas 2/17 (4 overs)

England won by 7 wickets
Senwes Park, Potchefstroom
Umpires: Lubabalo Gcuma (SA) and Clifford Isaacs (SA)
Player of the match: Sarah Taylor (Eng)

- England won the toss and elected to field.
- Georgia Elwiss (Eng) made her T20I debut.
