= Yolandi Potgieter =

South African cricketer (born 1989)

Personal information
- Full name: Yolandi Potgieter
- Born: 16 May 1989 (age 37); Bellville, Western Cape, South Africa
- Batting: Right-handed
- Bowling: Right-arm medium
- Role: All-rounder

International information
- National side: South Africa (2013–2014)
- ODI debut (cap 64): 7 January 2013 v West Indies
- Last ODI: 15 January 2014 v Pakistan
- ODI shirt no.: 18
- T20I debut (cap 33): 20 January 2013 v West Indies
- Last T20I: 22 January 2014 v Pakistan

Domestic team information
- Years: Team
- 2006/07–2015/16: Boland
- 2015/16–present: Free State

Career statistics
Competition	WODI	WT20I
Matches	16	7
Runs scored	96	5
Batting average	8.00	–
100s/50s	0/0	0/0
Top score	20	5*
Balls bowled	280	60
Wickets	6	0
Bowling average	32.50	–
5 wickets in innings	0	0
10 wickets in match	0	0
Best bowling	2/18	–
Catches/stumpings	3/–	2/–
- Source: ESPNcricinfo, 15 February 2021

Yolandi Potgieter (born 16 May 1989) is a South African cricketer who currently captains Free State. She plays as an all-rounder, batting right-handed and bowling right-arm medium. In 2013 and 2014, she appeared in 16 One Day Internationals and seven Twenty20 Internationals for South Africa. She has previously played domestic cricket for Boland, as well as appearing in a tour match for Western Province in 2009.
