= Birkenstock (disambiguation) =

Birkenstock is a German shoe manufacturer.

Birkenstock may also refer to:

- Arne Birkenstock (1967–2025), German film director and screenwriter
- Johann Adam Birkenstock, German composer and violinist
- Uwe-Karl Birkenstock, South African cricketer
