= Nhlanhla Dlamini (cricketer) =

South African cricketer (born 1998)

Personal information
- Born: 4 January 1998 (age 28)
- Source: Cricinfo, 3 November 2019

Nhlanhla Dlamini (born 4 January 1998) is a South African cricketer. He made his List A debut on 6 October 2019, for KwaZulu-Natal in the 2019–20 CSA Provincial One-Day Challenge.
