= 2016–17 CSA Women's Provincial T20 Competition =

South African women's domestic cricket season

- Dates: 9 October 2016 – 12 March 2017
- Administrator(s): Cricket South Africa
- Cricket format: Twenty20
- Tournament format(s): Round-robin divisions
- Champions: Western Province (4th title)
- Participants: 16
- Matches: 35
- Most runs: Susan Benade (190)
- Most wickets: Caelin Hall (8); Alicia Smith (8)

The 2016–17 CSA Women's Provincial T20 Competition was the 5th edition of South Africa's provincial Twenty20 cricket tournament. It ran from October 2016 to March 2017, with 16 provincial teams taking part. Western Province won the tournament, claiming their fourth T20 title and third in three seasons.

== Competition format ==
The 16 teams were divided into three divisions: a top division named "Top 6", and two lower divisions, Pools A and B. Teams played each other team in their group once in a round-robin format, with matches played using a Twenty20 format. The winner of the Top 6 group was crowned Champions.

The tournament ran concurrently with the 2016–17 CSA Women's Provincial League, with matches played either the day before or day after the corresponding encounter between two teams in the one-day tournament. To maintain this link for the following season, promotion and relegation in the Provincial T20 Competition was determined by standings in the Provincial League.

The groups worked on a points system with positions being based on the total points. Points were awarded as follows:

Win: 4 points
Tie: 3 points
Loss: 0 points.
Abandoned/No Result: 2 points.
Bonus Point: 1 bonus point available per match.

== Teams ==
| Top 6 | Boland | Eastern Province | Free State | Gauteng | North West | Western Province |
| Pool A | Border | Kei | KwaZulu-Natal | KwaZulu-Natal Inland | South Western Districts | |
| Pool B | Easterns | Limpopo | Mpumalanga | Northern Cape | Northerns | |

== Standings ==
=== Top 6 ===
| Team | Pld | W | L | T | NR | A | BP | Pts | NRR |
|---|---|---|---|---|---|---|---|---|---|
| Western Province (C) | 5 | 5 | 0 | 0 | 0 | 0 | 4 | 24 | +2.542 |
| Gauteng | 5 | 4 | 1 | 0 | 0 | 0 | 2 | 18 | +1.081 |
| Free State | 5 | 3 | 2 | 0 | 0 | 0 | 2 | 14 | +0.497 |
| Boland | 5 | 2 | 3 | 0 | 0 | 0 | 1 | 9 | –1.163 |
| North West | 5 | 1 | 4 | 0 | 0 | 0 | 1 | 5 | –0.547 |
| Eastern Province | 5 | 0 | 5 | 0 | 0 | 0 | 0 | 0 | –2.249 |

=== Pool A ===
| Team | Pld | W | L | T | NR | A | BP | Pts | NRR |
|---|---|---|---|---|---|---|---|---|---|
| KwaZulu-Natal | 4 | 4 | 0 | 0 | 0 | 0 | 3 | 19 | +2.207 |
| Border | 4 | 3 | 1 | 0 | 0 | 0 | 2 | 14 | +1.180 |
| South Western Districts | 4 | 2 | 2 | 0 | 0 | 0 | 2 | 10 | +1.099 |
| KwaZulu-Natal Inland | 4 | 1 | 3 | 0 | 0 | 0 | 0 | 4 | –1.207 |
| Kei | 4 | 0 | 4 | 0 | 0 | 0 | 0 | 0 | –3.175 |

=== Pool B ===
| Team | Pld | W | L | T | NR | A | BP | Pts | NRR |
|---|---|---|---|---|---|---|---|---|---|
| Northerns | 4 | 4 | 0 | 0 | 0 | 0 | 3 | 19 | +3.438 |
| Easterns | 4 | 3 | 1 | 0 | 0 | 0 | 3 | 15 | +0.893 |
| Northern Cape | 4 | 2 | 2 | 0 | 0 | 0 | 1 | 9 | +0.083 |
| Mpumalanga | 4 | 1 | 3 | 0 | 0 | 0 | 1 | 5 | –0.972 |
| Limpopo | 4 | 0 | 4 | 0 | 0 | 0 | 0 | 0 | –3.600 |
