= Karl Birkenstock =

Namibian cricketer (born 1996)

Personal information
- Born: 27 March 1996 (age 30); Centurion, South Africa
- Relatives: Rudi Birkenstock (father)

International information
- National side: Namibia
- ODI debut (cap 17): 27 April 2019 v Oman
- Last ODI: 2 April 2023 v UAE
- T20I debut (cap 2): 20 May 2019 v Ghana
- Last T20I: 5 November 2021 v New Zealand

Career statistics
Competition	ODI	T20I	FC	LA
Matches	20	9	9	32
Runs scored	258	81	153	393
Batting average	15.17	27.00	9.00	15.72
100s/50s	0/1	0/1	0/0	0/1
Top score	61	59	24	61
Balls bowled	246	30	342	414
Wickets	5	0	5	11
Bowling average	52.80	–	62.80	39.90
5 wickets in innings	0	–	0	0
10 wickets in match	0	–	0	0
Best bowling	2/24	–	2/44	3/34
Catches/stumpings	8/–	2/–	2/–	10/–
- Source: ESPNcricinfo, 20 February 2024

Karl Birkenstock (born 27 March 1996) is a Namibian cricketer. He made his first-class debut for Namibia against Western Province in the 2016–17 Sunfoil 3-Day Cup on 6 October 2016. His List A debut in the 2016–17 CSA Provincial One-Day Challenge was on 15 January 2017.

In March 2019, he was named in Namibia's squad for the 2019 ICC World Cricket League Division Two tournament. Namibia finished in the top four places in the tournament, therefore gaining One Day International (ODI) status. Birkenstock made his ODI debut on 27 April 2019, against Oman, in the tournament's final.

In May 2019, he was named in Namibia's squad for the Regional Finals of the 2018–19 ICC T20 World Cup Africa Qualifier tournament in Uganda. He made his Twenty20 International (T20I) debut for Namibia against Ghana on 20 May 2019.

In June 2019, he was one of twenty-five cricketers to be named in Cricket Namibia's Elite Men's Squad ahead of the 2019–20 international season. In September 2019, he was named in Namibia's squad for the 2019 ICC T20 World Cup Qualifier tournament in the United Arab Emirates. In September 2021, Birkenstock was named in Namibia's squad for the 2021 ICC Men's T20 World Cup.

Birkenstock's father Rudi Birkenstock is a cricket umpire who has umpired women's international games, and has also played cricket for Namibia's over-50's team. His cousin Uwe Birkenstock has played first-class cricket in South Africa.
