= Henro Janse van Rensburg =

South African cricketer (born 1998)

Personal information
- Born: 5 January 1998 (age 28)
- Source: Cricinfo, 17 October 2019

Henro Janse van Rensburg (born 5 January 1998) is a South African cricketer. He made his first-class debut on 17 October 2019, for North West in the 2019–20 CSA 3-Day Provincial Cup. He made his List A debut on 20 October 2019, for North West in the 2019–20 CSA Provincial One-Day Challenge.
