= Jordan Morris (cricketer) =

South African cricketer (born 1999)

Personal information
- Born: 1 March 1999 (age 27)
- Source: Cricinfo, 25 January 2020

Jordan Morris (born 1 March 1999) is a South African cricketer. He made his first-class debut on 23 January 2020, for North West in the 2019–20 CSA 3-Day Provincial Cup. He made his List A debut on 26 January 2020, for North West in the 2019–20 CSA Provincial One-Day Challenge.
