= Cloete Buitendag =

South African cricketer (born 1993)

Personal information
- Born: 18 May 1993 (age 33); Tzaneen, South Africa
- Source: ESPNcricinfo, 16 September 2016

Cloete Buitendag (born 18 May 1993) is a South African cricketer. He was included in the Northern Cape squad for the 2016 Africa T20 Cup. He made his first-class debut for Northern Cape in the 2016–17 Sunfoil 3-Day Cup on 20 October 2016. He made his List A debut for Northern Cape in the 2016–17 CSA Provincial One-Day Challenge on 13 November 2016.
