= Alicia Smith =

Alicia Smith may refer to:

- Alicia Smith (cricketer)
- Alicia Smith (tennis)
