= Justin Jordaan =

South African cricketer (born 1992)

Personal information
- Born: 9 January 1992 (age 34); Oudtshoorn, South Africa
- Source: ESPNcricinfo, 4 December 2016

Justin Jordaan (born 9 January 1992) is a South African former cricketer. He made his first-class debut for South Western Districts in the 2009–10 CSA Provincial Three-Day Challenge on 28 January 2010.
