= North West University No 2 Ground =

Cricket ground in Potchefstroom, South Africa

Ground information
- Location: Potchefstroom, South Africa
- Owner: North-West University
- Operator: North-West University

International information
- First WODI: 6 October 2010: South Africa v Sri Lanka
- Last WODI: 12 October 2010: South Africa v Netherlands
- First WT20I: 14 October 2010: Ireland v Sri Lanka
- Last WT20I: 16 October 2010: South Africa v Pakistan
- As of 7 September 2020; Source: North-West University No 2 Ground CricketArchive

The North West University No 2 Ground is a cricket ground in Potchefstroom, South Africa. It has hosted senior cricket since 2010, when it was one of three venues used for the ICC Women's Cricket Challenge.
