= Zandrè Swartz =

South African cricketer (born 1991)

Personal information
- Born: 15 May 1991 (age 35)
- Source: Cricinfo, 26 March 2017

Zandrè Swartz (born 15 May 1991) is a South African cricketer. He made his first-class debut for Griqualand West in the 2009–10 CSA Provincial Three-Day Challenge on 22 October 2009.
