= Sinovuyo Ntuntwana =

South African cricketer (born 1993)

Personal information
- Born: 2 February 1993 (age 33); Alice, Eastern Cape, South Africa
- Source: ESPNcricinfo, 13 November 2016

Sinovuyo Ntuntwana (born 2 February 1993) is a South African cricketer. He made his first-class debut for Border in the 2015–16 Sunfoil 3-Day Cup on 15 October 2015.
