= Neill Jordaan =

South African cricketer

Personal information
- Full name: Neill Jordaan
- Source: Cricinfo, 2 November 2019

Neill Jordaan is a South African cricketer. He made his first-class debut on 31 October 2019, for KwaZulu-Natal in the 2019–20 CSA 3-Day Provincial Cup. He made his List A debut on 3 November 2019, for KwaZulu-Natal in the 2019–20 CSA Provincial One-Day Challenge.
