= Masilo Ramothata =

South African cricketer (born 1989)

Personal information
- Born: 30 November 1989 (age 36); Johannesburg, South Africa
- Source: ESPNcricinfo, 22 January 2017

Masilo Ramothata (born 30 November 1989) is a South African cricketer. He made his first-class debut for Griqualand West in the 2014–15 Sunfoil 3-Day Cup on 11 December 2014.
