= Faizel Samsoodien =

South African cricket umpire (born 1958)

Personal information
- Born: 17 November 1958 (age 67); Johannesburg, South Africa

Umpiring information
- Source: Cricinfo, 28 February 2017

Faizel Samsoodien (born 17 November 1958) is a South African cricket umpire. He was one of the umpires in the 2010 ICC Women's Cricket Challenge, a limited overs tournament, in October 2010.

In South Africa domestic cricket, he has stood in matches in the 2016–17 Sunfoil 3-Day Cup and the 2016–17 CSA Provincial One-Day Challenge tournaments.
