= Matthew Luksich =

South African cricketer (born 1996)

Personal information
- Born: 2 July 1996 (age 30)
- Source: ESPNcricinfo, 26 February 2017

Matthew Luksich (born 2 July 1996) is a South African cricketer. He made his List A debut for KwaZulu-Natal Inland in the 2016–17 CSA Provincial One-Day Challenge on 26 February 2017.
