= Nazeer Jaffar =

South African cricketer (born 1996)

Personal information
- Born: 23 April 1996 (age 30)
- Source: ESPNcricinfo, 9 October 2016

Nazeer Jaffar (born 23 April 1996) is a South African cricketer. He made his List A debut for KwaZulu-Natal in the 2016–17 CSA Provincial One-Day Challenge on 9 October 2016.
