= Witrand Cricket Field =

Cricket ground in Potchefstroom, South Africa

Coordinates: 26.6872°S 27.0731°E

Ground information
- Location: Potchefstroom, South Africa

International information
- First WODI: 6 October 2010: Netherlands v West Indies
- Last WODI: 12 October 2010: Ireland v Sri Lanka
- Only WT20I: 16 October 2010: Ireland v Netherlands
- As of 7 September 2020; Source: Witrand Cricket Field CricketArchive

The Witrand Cricket Field is a cricket ground in Potchefstroom, South Africa. It has hosted senior cricket irregularly since 1991, when Western Transvaal hosted Western Province. In 2010, it was one of three venues used for the ICC Women's Cricket Challenge.

The cricket field is situated within the grounds of the Witrand Psychiatric Hospital, just west of the North-West University, in Potchefstroom.
