= Sbonginhlanhla Makhaye =

South African cricketer (born 1997)

Personal information
- Born: 10 January 1997 (age 29); South Africa
- Source: ESPNcricinfo, 31 October 2016

Sbonginhlanhla Makhaye (born 10 January 1997) is a South African cricketer. He made his List A debut for KwaZulu-Natal in the 2016–17 CSA Provincial One-Day Challenge on 31 October 2016.
