= Gavin Reddy =

South African cricketer (born 1996)

Personal information
- Born: 19 August 1996 (age 30)
- Source: ESPNcricinfo, 18 December 2016

Gavin Reddy (born 19 August 1996) is a South African cricketer. He made his List A debut for KwaZulu-Natal in the 2016–17 CSA Provincial One-Day Challenge on 18 December 2016.
