= Gert Cloete =

South African cricketer (born 1988)

Personal information
- Born: 11 September 1988 (age 38)
- Source: Cricinfo, 8 March 2020

Gert Cloete (born 11 September 1988) is a South African cricketer. He made his List A debut on 8 March 2020, for Northern Cape in the 2019–20 CSA Provincial One-Day Challenge.
