= 2015–16 Sunfoil 3-Day Cup =

- Dates: 8 October 2015 – 3 April 2016
- Administrator: Cricket South Africa
- Cricket format: First-class
- Tournament format: Round-robin
- Champions: (South Africa) KwaZulu-Natal Inland (2nd title)
- Participants: 14
- Most runs: Zubayr Hamza (830)
- Most wickets: Gurshwin Rabie (43)

The 2015–16 Sunfoil 3-Day Cup was a first-class cricket competition that took place in South Africa from 8 October 2015 to 4 April 2016. The competition was played between the thirteen South African provincial teams and Namibia. Unlike its counterpart, the Sunfoil Series, the matches were three days in length instead of four.

Western Province finished top of Pool A and KwaZulu-Natal Inland finished top of Pool B, with both teams progressing to the final of the competition. The final was played at Newlands Cricket Ground in Cape Town, with KwaZulu-Natal Inland winning by 46 runs.

== Points table ==
Pool A

Team	Pld	W	L	D	Pts
(South Africa) Western Province	10	5	3	2	127.44
(South Africa) North West	10	5	2	3	113.74
(South Africa) KwaZulu-Natal	10	4	2	4	103.24
(South Africa) Northerns	10	3	2	5	102.60
(South Africa) South Western Districts	10	3	3	4	91.52
(South Africa) Northern Cape	10	3	5	2	86.38
(South Africa) Border	10	2	3	5	76.82

Team qualified for the final

Pool B

Team	Pld	W	L	D	Pts
(South Africa) KwaZulu-Natal Inland	10	4	0	6	117.16
(South Africa) Eastern Province	10	4	2	4	116.1
(South Africa) Easterns	10	3	4	3	106.88
(South Africa) Gauteng	10	2	5	3	90.40
(South Africa) Free State	10	3	3	4	86.70
(South Africa) Boland	10	2	2	6	81.30
Namibia	10	1	8	1	47.60

Team qualified for the final

== Final ==
31 March – 3 April 2016
Scorecard

KwaZulu-Natal Inland (South Africa)	v	(South Africa) Western Province
268 (80.4 overs); Mbasa Gqadushe 116 (188); George Linde 5/55 (20 overs)		137 (60.3 overs); Zubayr Hamza 59* (154); Ruhan Pretorious 3/10 (7 overs)
162 (59.5 overs); Divan van Wyk 32 (54); Jason Smith 3/35 (12 overs)		247 (85.1 overs); Pieter Malan 69 (159); Gareth Dukes 4/42 (16.1 overs)

KwaZulu-Natal Inland won by 46 runs
Newlands Cricket Ground, Cape Town
Umpires: Ryan Hendricks and Jeff Wolhuter

- KwaZulu-Natal Inland won the toss and elected to bat.
