= Gavin Morris =

South African cricketer (born 1998)

Personal information
- Born: 24 October 1998 (age 26); Durban, South Africa
- Source: ESPNcricinfo, 15 January 2017

Gavin Morris (born 24 October 1998) is a South African cricketer. He made his List A debut for KwaZulu-Natal in the 2016–17 CSA Provincial One-Day Challenge on 15 January 2017.
