= Johann Smit =

South African cricketer (born 1994)

Personal information
- Born: 4 February 1994 (age 32)
- Source: ESPNcricinfo, 9 October 2016

Johann Smit (born 4 February 1994) is a South African cricketer. He made his List A debut for KwaZulu-Natal in the 2016–17 CSA Provincial One-Day Challenge on 9 October 2016.
