= Reeve Cyster =

South African cricketer (born 1993)

Personal information
- Born: 25 November 1993 (age 32)
- Source: ESPNcricinfo, 26 November 2016

Reeve Cyster (born 25 November 1993) is a South African cricketer. He made his List A debut for Boland in the 2016–17 CSA Provincial One-Day Challenge on 26 November 2016. In September 2018, he was named in Boland's squad for the 2018 Africa T20 Cup. He made his first-class debut for Boland in the 2018–19 CSA 3-Day Provincial Cup on 14 February 2019. In September 2019, he was named in Boland's squad for the 2019–20 CSA Provincial T20 Cup.
