= Jesse Christensen =

South African cricketer (born 1998)

Personal information
- Born: 7 September 1998 (age 28); Cape Town, South Africa
- Source: Cricinfo, 5 March 2017

Jesse Christensen (born 7 September 1998) is a South African cricketer. He made his List A debut for Western Province in the 2016–17 CSA Provincial One-Day Challenge on 5 March 2017. He made his first-class debut for Western Province in the 2016–17 Sunfoil 3-Day Cup on 23 March 2017.
