= Martin Walters =

South African cricketer (born 1985)

Personal information
- Born: 12 March 1985 (age 41); East London, Eastern Cape, South Africa
- Source: ESPNcricinfo, 4 December 2016

Martin Walters (born 12 March 1985) is a South African cricketer. He made his first-class debut for Western Province in the 2005–06 SAA Provincial Challenge on 13 October 2005.
