= Irvin van Kerwel =

South African cricket umpire (born 1963)

Personal information
- Born: 27 May 1963 (age 63); Stellenbosch, South Africa

Umpiring information
- WODIs umpired: 3 (2009)
- WT20Is umpired: 2 (2009)
- Source: Cricinfo, 2 March 2017

Irvin van Kerwel (born 27 May 1963) is a South African cricket umpire. He has stood in matches in the 2016–17 Sunfoil 3-Day Cup and the 2016–17 CSA Provincial One-Day Challenge tournaments.
