= Warwick Abrahim =

South African cricketer (born 1990)

Personal information
- Full name: Warwick Abrahim
- Born: 4 July 1990 (age 36)
- Batting: Left-handed
- Bowling: Right-arm medium

Career statistics
Competition	First-class	List A	T20
Matches	2	2	1
Runs scored	8	2	–
Batting average	4	2	–
100s/50s	0/0	0/0	–
Top score	5*	2	-
Catches/stumpings	1/0	0/0	0/0
- Source: ESPNcricinfo, 2 March 2017

Warwick Abrahim (born 4 July 1990) is a South African cricketer, who played for North West in first-class, List A and T20 cricket.
