= Inoka Galagedara =

Sri Lankan cricketer (born 1977)

Personal information
- Born: 17 July 1977 (age 49); Colombo, Sri Lanka
- Batting: Right-handed

International information
- National side: Sri Lanka
- Source: Cricinfo, 12 April 2014

Inoka Galagedara (born 17 July 1977) is a Sri Lankan cricketer. She made her WODI and WT20I debut against Pakistan in January 2002 and June 2009, respectively
