= Uwe-Karl Birkenstock =

South African cricketer (born 1989)

Uwe-Karl Janko Birkenstock (born 26 May 1989) is a South African cricketer. He is a right-handed batsman and right-arm off-break bowler who played for Boland. He was born in Pretoria.

Birkenstock began his cricketing career in the English Southern Premier Cricket League, playing for Andover, who finished in sixth position in the 2008 table, a season in which he played 15 of the team's 16 matches.

Birkenstock played two matches for Worcestershire Second XI during the 2008 season, scoring a half century in his second of three innings for the side.

Birkenstock's first-class debut came during the 2009–10 South African cricket season, for Boland against Griqualand West.

Birkenstock is the nephew of international cricket umpire Rudi Birkenstock and cousin of Namibian international player Karl Birkenstock.
