= Rudi Birkenstock =

South African cricket umpire (born 1963)

Personal information
- Born: 8 November 1963 (age 63); Johannesburg, South Africa
- Relatives: Karl Birkenstock (son); Uwe Birkenstock (nephew)

Umpiring information
- WODIs umpired: 7 (2008–2013)
- WT20Is umpired: 2 (2013)
- Source: Cricinfo, 2 March 2017

Rudi Birkenstock (born 8 November 1963) is a South African cricket umpire. He has stood in matches in the 2016–17 Sunfoil 3-Day Cup and the 2016–17 CSA Provincial One-Day Challenge tournaments. His son, Karl, plays first-class cricket for Namibia.
