= Izak Cornelis Bergh =

South African cricketer (born 1993)

Personal information
- Born: 13 May 1993 (age 33)
- Nickname: Neels
- Batting: Right-handed
- Bowling: Right-arm legbreak
- Source: ESPNcricinfo, 4 September 2016

Izak Cornelis Bergh (born 13 May 1993) is a South African first-class cricketer. He is right-handed batsman and a right-arm Legbreak bowler. He made his First Class debut for Gauteng against Eastern Province.
