= Siyabonga Booi =

South African cricketer (born 1986)

Personal information
- Born: 29 July 1986 (age 40)
- Source: ESPNcricinfo, 13 September 2016

Siyabonga Booi (born 29 July 1986) is a South African cricketer. He was included in the South Western Districts cricket team squad for the 2016 Africa T20 Cup.
