= CSA Provincial Competitions =

South African domestic cricket competitions

- Countries: Namibia; South Africa
- Administrator: Cricket South Africa
- Format: First-class; Limited-overs; Twenty20
- First edition: 2004–05
- Next edition: 2016–17
- Number of teams: 11 (2004–05); 12 (2005–06); 17 (2006–07); 14 (2007–18); 13 (2018–19); 16 (since 2019)

The CSA Provincial Competitions are three South African domestic cricket competitions run by Cricket South Africa (CSA). Three-day (first-class) and one-day (List A) competitions were introduced for the 2004–05 season, while a Twenty20 competition was introduced for the 2011–12 season.

The CSA competitions are predominantly contested by South African provincial teams, the number of which has been fixed at thirteen since the 2007–08 season. (Note: Although the teams are called "provincial", they do not correspond exactly to the provinces of South Africa – several provinces are represented by more than one team, while others do not field any teams.) A non-South African team, Namibia, has competed since the 2006–07 season, while two invitational teams from Zimbabwe competed in the early seasons. Prior to the introduction of the CSA competitions, the South African provincial teams competed in the Sunfoil Series (better known as the Currie Cup) and the domestic one-day tournament (known under various names). As part of a reorganisation of South Africa's domestic structure, the provincial teams were replaced in those competitions by six franchise teams, which are wholly professional.

- CSA 4-Day Domestic Series
- CSA One-Day Cup
- CSA T20 Challenge
- SA20
- CSA Provincial T20 Cup

== Teams and venues ==
Map of the venues for matches played in the 2016–17 CSA Provincial competitions

Home team	Stadium	City	Capacity
Boland	Boland Bank Park	Paarl	10,000
Boland	Brackenfell Sports Fields	Brackenfell	
Border	Buffalo Park	East London	15,000
Eastern Province	St George's Park	Port Elizabeth	19,000
Easterns	Willowmoore Park	Benoni	20,000
Free State	Chevrolet Park	Bloemfontein	20,000
Gauteng	Wanderers Stadium	Johannesburg	34,000
KwaZulu-Natal	Kingsmead	Durban	25,000
KwaZulu-Natal Inland	City Oval	Pietermaritzburg	12,000
Northern Cape	De Beers Diamond Oval	Kimberley	11,000
Northerns	SuperSport Park	Centurion	20,000
Northerns	LC de Villiers Oval	Pretoria	2,000
North West	Senwes Park	Potchefstroom	9,000
South Western Districts	Recreation Ground	Oudtshoorn	
Western Province	Newlands	Cape Town	22,500
Namibia	Sparta Cricket Club Ground	Walvis Bay	
Namibia	Wanderers Cricket Ground	Windhoek	

== CSA 3-Day Cup ==
Name

- 2004–05: UCB Provincial Cup
- 2005–06 to 2008–09: South African Airways Provincial Three-Day Challenge
- 2009–10 to 2013–14: CSA Provincial Three-Day Competition
- 2014–15 to 2017-18: Sunfoil 3-Day Cup
- 2018/19 onwards: CSA 3-Day Cup

=== List of winners ===
Season	Final venue	Result			Ref
Season	Final venue	Winner	Margin	Runner-up	Ref
2004–05	Kimberley	Griqualand West; 184 and 208/3	Griquas won by 7 wickets scorecard	Border; 240 and 151	
2005–06	Cape Town	Northerns; 267 and 333/6	Northerns won by 100 runs scorecard	Western Province; 317 and 183	
2006–07	Johannesburg	Gauteng; 286 and 345	Gauteng won by 95 runs scorecard	Eastern Province; 333 and 203	
2007–08	Kimberley	Griqualand West (2); 144 and 227	Griquas won by 42 runs scorecard	Western Province (2); 155 and 174	
2008–09	Kimberley	Griqualand West (3); 482 and 150/4	Griquas won by 243 runs scorecard	North West; 248 and 141	
2009–10	no final	Eastern Province; 190.76 points	Eastern Province won on points table	Gauteng; 167.88 points	
2010–11	no final	Western Province; 201.56 points	Western Province won on points table	Gauteng (2); 189.06 points	
2011–12	no final	Griqualand West (4); 151.70 points	Griquas won on points table	Gauteng (3); 144.94 points	
2012–13	no final	Gauteng (2); 172.22 points	Gauteng won on points table	North West (2); 158.04 points	
2013–14	no final	Western Province (2); 167.30 points	Western Province won on points table	North West (3); 157.18 points	
2014–15	Centurion	Gauteng (3); 292 and 225/4; Northerns (2); 269 and 42/3	Match drawn (trophy shared) scorecard	—	
2015–16	Cape Town	KZN Inland; 268 and 162	KZN Inland won by 46 runs scorecard	Western Province (3); 137 and 247	
2016–17	Pretoria	Free State; 285/9 and 241/6; Northerns (3); 170 and 198/5	Match drawn (trophy shared) scorecard	—	
2017–18	Durban	KwaZulu-Natal; 334/4d	KwaZulu-Natal won by an innings and 25 runs scorecard	Namibia; 132 and 177	
2018–19	Port Elizabeth	Eastern Province (2); 477 and 85/5d Northerns (4); 272 and 147/2	Match drawn (trophy shared) scorecard	—	
2019–20	no final	Easterns; KwaZulu-Natal	Trophy shared	—	

=== Performance by team ===
Legend

- 1st – Champions
- 2nd – Runners-up
- 3rd – Third place
- underlined – position shared by two teams

Team	2004– 05	2005– 06	2006– 07	2007– 08	2008– 09	2009– 10	2010– 11	2011– 12	2012– 13	2013– 14	2014– 15	2015– 16	2016– 17	2017– 18	2018– 19	Total
Boland	9th	10th	11th	4th	14th	11th	10th	11th	3rd	7th	13th	12th	11th	11th	9th	15
Border	2nd	5th	13th	12th	7th	13th	13th	6th	9th	4th	11th	13th	10th	7th	12th	15
Eastern Province	7th	11th	2nd	9th	5th	1st	7th	12th	10th	3rd	7th	3rd	8th	8th	1st	15
Easterns	11th	8th	8th	8th	4th	4th	11th	4th	8th	9th	9th	5th	7th	6th	6th	15
Free State	6th	6th	12th	10th	10th	9th	3rd	8th	5th	13th	4th	10th	1st	4th	5th	15
Gauteng	4th	9th	1st	3rd	3rd	2nd	2nd	2nd	1st	12th	1st	9th	5th	14th	3rd	15
Kei	—	—	17th	—	—	—	—	—	—	—	—	—	—	—	—	1
KwaZulu-Natal	3rd	4th	6th	13th	13th	10th	5th	10th	12th	10th	12th	6th	13th	1st	8th	15
KZN Inland	—	—	9th	15th	11th	14th	12th	13th	13th	6th	6th	1st	6th	4th	10th	13
Limpopo	—	—	14th	—	—	—	—	—	—	—	—	—	—	—	—	1
Mpumalanga	—	—	16th	—	—	—	—	—	—	—	—	—	—	—	—	1
Namibia	—	—	3rd	14th	8th	12th	14th	14th	14th	14th	14th	14th	14th	2nd	—	12
Northern Cape (Griqualand West)	1st	7th	5th	1st	1st	7th	4th	1st	11th	8th	10th	11th	9th	13th	13th	15
Northerns	5th	1st	4th	5th	6th	3rd	9th	9th	6th	5th	1st	7th	1st	9th	1st	15
North West	10th	3rd	10th	7th	2nd	8th	8th	5th	2nd	2nd	3rd	4th	3rd	10th	11th	15
SW Districts	—	—	15th	11th	9th	6th	6th	3rd	4th	11th	8th	8th	12th	12th	7th	12
Western Province	8th	2nd	7th	2nd	12th	5th	1st	7th	7th	1st	5th	2nd	4th	3rd	4th	15
Zim. Provinces	—	—	—	6th	—	—	—	—	—	—	—	—	—	—	—	1
Zim. U-23s	—	12th	—	—	—	—	—	—	—	—	—	—	—	—	—	1

== CSA Provincial One-Day Cup ==
=== CSA Provincial One-Day Challenge ===
Name and format

- 2004–05: UCB Provincial Shield (45 overs)
- 2005–06 to 2008–09: South African Airways Provincial One-Day Challenge (45 overs)
- 2009–10: CSA Provincial One-Day Competition (45 overs)
- 2010–11: CSA Provincial One-Day Competition (40 overs)
- 2011–12 to 2013–14: CSA Provincial One-Day Competition (50 overs)
- 2014–15 to 2017–18: CSA Provincial 50 Over Challenge (50 overs)
- 2018–19 onwards: CSA 1-Day Cup

2023 CSA Provincial One-Day Challenge

=== List of winners ===
Season	Final venue	Result			Ref
Season	Final venue	Winner	Margin	Runner-up	Ref
2004–05	Paarl	Free State; 281/5 (44 overs)	Free State won by 5 wickets scorecard	Boland; 277/7 (45 overs)	
2005–06	Paarl	Northerns; 240/4 (45 overs)	Northerns won by 4 runs scorecard	Boland (2); 236/8 (45 overs)	
2006–07	Durban	KwaZulu-Natal; 124/2 (20 overs)	KwaZulu-Natal won by 8 wickets scorecard	Northerns; 121 (36 overs)	
2007–08	Johannesburg	Gauteng; 130/4 (28.5 overs)	Gauteng won by 6 wickets (D/L) scorecard	Northerns (2); 132 (37.2 overs)	
2008–09	Paarl	Boland; 208/4 (41.5 overs)	Boland won by 6 wickets scorecard	KwaZulu-Natal; 204/9 (45 overs)	
2009–10	no final	Northerns (2); 45 points	Northerns won on points table	Gauteng; 38 points	
2010–11	no final	Western Province; 49 points	Western Province won on points table	Northerns (3); 37 points	
2011–12	no final	Free State (2); 29 points	Free State won on points table	KwaZulu-Natal (2); 26 points	
2012–13	Bloemfontein	Border; 208/7 (45.3 overs)	Border won by 3 wickets scorecard	Free State; 207 (48.5 overs)	
2013–14	no final	KZN Inland; 22 points	KZN Inland won on head-to-head result (Note: KwaZulu-Natal Inland, Gauteng, and Free State all finished equal on points and matches won. Free State had fewer bonus points than the other two teams, which were equal, and so were placed third. KwaZulu-Natal Inland had defeated Gauteng in the teams' head-to-head match, and thus were named champions.) table	Gauteng (2); 22 points	
2014–15	Bloemfontein	Border (2); 111/5 (34.2 overs)	Border won by 5 wickets scorecard	Free State (2); 110 (32.3 overs)	
2015–16	Potchefstroom	Gauteng (2); 230/3 (46.2 overs)	Gauteng won by 7 wickets scorecard	North West; 224/8 (50 overs)	
2016–17	Centurion	Northerns (3); 251/3 (43.1 overs)	Northerns won by 7 wickets scorecard	Namibia; 245 (48.3 overs)	
2017–18	Johannesburg	North West; 179 (49.2 overs)	North West won by 34 runs scorecard	Gauteng (3); 145 (41.3 overs)	
2018–19	Centurion	Easterns; 277/8 (46.5 overs)	Easterns won by 2 wickets scorecard	Northerns (4); 276/8 (50 overs)	
2019–20	no final	Free State; Northern Cape	Trophy shared	—	

=== Performance by team ===
Legend

- 1st – Champions
- 2nd – Runners-up
- 3rd – Third place
- SF – Losing semi-finalist (no third-place playoff)

Team	2004– 05	2005– 06	2006– 07	2007– 08	2008– 09	2009– 10	2010– 11	2011– 12	2012– 13	2013– 14	2014– 15	2015– 16	2016– 17	2017– 18	2018– 19	Total
Boland	2nd	2nd	7th	12th	1st	8th	11th	9th	4th	10th	6th	8th	8th	14th	12th	15
Border	11th	11th	13th	11th	5th	5th	7th	6th	1st	8th	1st	13th	14th	6th	13th	15
Eastern Province	9th	SF	9th	SF	6th	3rd	9th	4th	14th	6th	7th	4th	5th	12th	6th	15
Easterns	7th	8th	6th	7th	10th	13th	12th	14th	12th	11th	14th	12th	7th	7th	1st	15
Free State	1st	7th	11th	5th	9th	6th	8th	1st	2nd	3rd	2nd	11th	11th	10th	5th	15
Gauteng	5th	SF	8th	1st	12th	2nd	3rd	10th	5th	2nd	10th	1st	9th	2nd	3rd	15
Kei	—	—	16th	—	—	—	—	—	—	—	—	—	—	—	—	1
KwaZulu-Natal	6th	9th	1st	10th	2nd	9th	4th	2nd	7th	4th	5th	14th	3rd	4th	11th	15
KZN Inland	—	—	12th	15th	SF	12th	11th	11th	10th	1st	3rd	6th	13th	3rd	9th	15
Limpopo	—	—	14th	—	—	—	—	—	—	—	—	—	—	—	—	1
Mpumalanga	—	—	17th	—	—	—	—	—	—	—	—	—	—	—	—	1
Namibia	—	—	5th	13th	7th	14th	10th	13th	6th	14th	13th	10th	2nd	5th	—	12
Northern Cape (Griqualand West)	8th	10th	SF	8th	8th	4th	14th	8th	13th	13th	9th	9th	6th	13th	10th	15
Northerns	SF	1st	2nd	2nd	11th	1st	2nd	3rd	11th	9th	4th	7th	1st	9th	2nd	15
North West	SF	6th	10th	9th	13th	7th	6th	12th	3rd	5th	8th	2nd	4th	1st	7th	15
SW Districts	—	—	15th	SF	14th	11th	5th	5th	9th	7th	12th	5th	12th	8th	4th	13
Western Province	10th	5th	SF	6th	SF	10th	1st	7th	8th	12th	11th	3rd	10th	11th	8th	15
Zim. Provinces	—	—	—	14th	—	—	—	—	—	—	—	—	—	—	—	1
Zim. U-23s	—	12th	—	—	—	—	—	—	—	—	—	—	—	—	—	1

== CSA Provincial T20 Cup ==
- 2023 CSA Provincial One-Day Challenge Division 1
- 2023 CSA Provincial One-Day Challenge Division 2
- CSA Provincial One-Day Challenge Division 1
- CSA Provincial One-Day Challenge Division 2
- CSA Provincial T20 Cup
- CSA Provincial T20 Challenge

Name and format

- 2011–12 to 2014–15: CSA Provincial T20 (20 overs)
- 2014–15 to 2015–16: CSA Provincial T20 Challenge (20 overs)
- 2016–17 to 2018–19: Not contested
- 2019–20 onwards: CSA Provincial T20 Cup (20 overs)

=== List of winners ===
Season	Final venue	Result			Ref
Season	Final venue	Winner	Margin	Runner-up	Ref
2011–12	Port Elizabeth	Northerns; 154/5 (20 overs)	Northerns won by 16 runs scorecard	Eastern Province; 138/9 (20 overs)	
2012–13	no final	Free State; 32 points	Free State won on points table	Gauteng; 25 points	
2013–14	Johannesburg	KZN Inland; 132/2 (17.2 overs)	KZN Inland won by 8 wickets scorecard	Gauteng (2); 128/7 (20 overs)	
2014–15	no final	Gauteng; 17 points	Gauteng won on points table	Northerns; 13 points	
2015–16	no final	KZN Inland (2); 18 points	KZN Inland won on points table	Eastern Province (2); 17 points	
2019–20	Benoni	Easterns; 178/6 (20 overs)	Easterns won by 5 runs scorecard	KZN Inland; 128/7 (20 overs)	

=== Performance by team ===
Legend

- 1st – Champions
- 2nd – Runners-up
- 3rd – Third place
- SF – Losing semi-finalist (no third-place playoff)

Team	2011–12	2012–13	2013–14	2014–15	2015–16	2019–20	Total
Boland	8th	14th	10th	13th	14th	14th	6
Border	13th	7th	5th	7th	7th	SF	6
Eastern Province	2nd	5th	12th	11th	2nd	SF	6
Easterns	11th	11th	13th	12th	11th	1st	6
Free State	4th	1st	8th	14th	3rd	15th	6
Gauteng	9th	2nd	2nd	1st	13th	12th	6
KwaZulu-Natal	7th	4th	11th	5th	8th	6th	6
KZN Inland	12th	12th	1st	10th	1st	2nd	6
Limpopo	–	–	–	–	–	5th	1
Mpumalanga	–	–	–	–	–	10th	1
Namibia	14th	8th	14th	3rd	12th	–	5
Northern Cape (Griqualand West)	5th	3rd	3rd	4th	10th	7th	6
Northerns	1st	6th	9th	2nd	5th	8th	6
North West	3rd	13th	4th	9th	9th	9th	6
SW Districts	10th	9th	7th	8th	6th	11th	6
Western Province	6th	10th	6th	6th	4th	13th	6

CSA Provincial T20 Challenge
- Countries: South Africa
- Administrator: Cricket South Africa
- Format: Twenty20
- First edition: 2011–12
- Latest edition: 2015-16
- Tournament format: Double round-robin, qualifier and final
- Number of teams: 14
- Current champion: KZN Inland (2 titles)
- Most successful: KZN Inland (2 titles)

The CSA Provincial T20 is a Twenty20 Cricket competition in South Africa, first contested in the 2011–12 season. It was previously known as the CSA Provincial T20 until the season, the CSA Provincial T20 Challenge for the 2014-15 season and most recently as the competition was itself cancelled in favour of the CSA Provincial T20 Cup from 2019–20.

== Africa T20 Cup ==
The Africa T20 Cup was an additional provincial tournament organised by Cricket South Africa. It featured representative teams from other African countries, including Kenya, Namibia, Nigeria, Uganda and Zimbabwe in addition to the South African provincial sides. The Africa T20 was first held in September to October 2015 at the start of the South African season, and was followed by the CSA Provincial T20 Challenge later in the year. From the 2015–16 season, the CSA Challenge League was not played, leaving the Africa T20 Cup as the only provincial level T20 tournament in the country. It ran for four editions before being scrapped, with the CSA Provincial T20 Cup returning and taking over as the only provincial T20 tournament.

=== List of winners ===
Year	Final venue	Result		
Year	Final venue	Winner	Margin	Runner-up
2015	Mangaung Oval, Bloemfontein	Northerns; 107/3 (18 overs)	Northerns won by 7 wickets scorecard	KwaZulu-Natal Inland; 103/8 (20 overs)
2016	Recreation Ground, Oudtshoorn	Eastern Province; 165/6 (20 overs)	Eastern Province won by 31 runs scorecard	Northern Cape; 134/9 (20 overs)
2017	Diamond Oval, Kimberley	KwaZulu-Natal Inland; 129/4 (17.5 overs)	KwaZulu-Natal Inland won by 6 wickets scorecard	Free State; 128/5 (20 overs)
2018	Buffalo Park, East London	Gauteng; 131/7 (19.2 overs)	Gauteng won by 3 wickets scorecard	Border; 130 (20 overs)

== See also ==
- CSA 4-Day Domestic Series
- CSA Provincial One-Day Challenge
- CSA One-Day Cup
- CSA T20 Challenge
- CSA Provincial T20 Cup
- CSA Women's Provincial Programme
- CSA Women's Provincial T20 Competition
