= Godfrey Stevens =

South African cricketer (1986–2021)

Personal information
- Full name: Godfrey Cyril Stevens
- Born: 24 June 1986; Porterville, South Africa
- Died: 30 August 2021 (aged 35)
- Batting: Left-handed
- Bowling: Slow left orthodox

Domestic team information
- Years: Team
- 2005/06–2016/17: Boland
- First-class debut: 16 February 2006 Boland v Western Province
- List A debut: 12 February 2006 Boland v Border

Career statistics
Competition	First-class	List A
Matches	50	43
Runs scored	1,675	689
Batting average	20.42	19.13
100s/50s	0/8	0/3
Top score	82	77
Balls bowled	3,455	1,538
Wickets	50	41
Bowling average	39.74	28.39
5 wickets in innings	0	0
10 wickets in match	0	0
Best bowling	4/32	3/18
Catches/stumpings	31/–	16/–
- Source: CricketArchive, 18 December 2025

Godfrey Cyril Stevens (24 June 1986 – 30 August 2021) was a South African cricketer. A left-handed batsman and left-arm orthodox spin bowler, he played first-class cricket for Boland from the 2005/06 season until 2016/17. He featured three times for South Africa national under-19 cricket team at the 2004 Under-19 World Cup.

Stevens died in 2021, at the age of 35, following a short illness.
