= Amanda Samaroo =

Trinidadian cricketer (born 1992)

Personal information
- Full name: Amanda Mindy Samaroo
- Born: 2 November 1992 (age 34); Trinidad
- Batting: Right-handed
- Bowling: Right-arm medium
- Role: Batter

International information
- National side: West Indies (2009–2012)
- ODI debut (cap 67): 16 October 2009 v South Africa
- Last ODI: 23 October 2009 v South Africa
- T20I debut (cap 23): 28 October 2009 v South Africa
- Last T20I: 7 May 2012 v Sri Lanka

Domestic team information
- Years: Team
- 2009–2016: Trinidad and Tobago

Career statistics
| Competition | WODI | WT20I | WLA | WT20 |
|---|---|---|---|---|
| Matches | 3 | 5 | 23 | 19 |
| Runs scored | 25 | 33 | 391 | 385 |
| Batting average | 8.33 | 11.00 | 19.55 | 27.50 |
| 100s/50s | 0/0 | 0/0 | 0/1 | 0/2 |
| Top score | 16 | 12* | 53 | 98 |
| Balls bowled | 12 | – | 253 | 42 |
| Wickets | 0 | – | 4 | 0 |
| Bowling average | – | – | 46.25 | – |
| 5 wickets in innings | 0 | – | 0 | 0 |
| 10 wickets in match | 0 | – | 0 | 0 |
| Best bowling | – | – | 1/12 | – |
| Catches/stumpings | 1/– | 1/– | 4/– | 4/– |
- Source: CricketArchive, 22 May 2021

Amanda Mindy Samaroo (born 2 November 1992) is a Trinidadian former cricketer who played as a right-handed batter. She appeared in 3 One Day Internationals and 5 Twenty20 Internationals for the West Indies between 2009 and 2012. She played domestic cricket for Trinidad and Tobago.
