= Yolandi van der Westhuizen =

South African cricketer and coach (born 1981)

Personal information
- Full name: Yolandi van der Westhuizen
- Born: 11 December 1981 (age 44); Cape Town, South Africa
- Batting: Right-handed
- Role: Wicket-keeper

International information
- National side: South Africa (2009–2014)
- ODI debut (cap 55): 12 March 2009 v New Zealand
- Last ODI: 9 September 2012 v Bangladesh
- ODI shirt no.: 2
- T20I debut (cap 28): 27 October 2011 v England
- Last T20I: 4 April 2014 v England

Domestic team information
- Years: Team
- 2005/06–2006/07: Western Province
- 2007/08–2017/18: Boland

Career statistics
Competition	WODI	WT20I	WLA	WT20
Matches	8	12	100	28
Runs scored	40	20	2,589	315
Batting average	5.71	4.00	33.62	21.00
100s/50s	0/0	0/0	1/18	0/0
Top score	20	11	114*	48
Catches/stumpings	4/–	2/–	86/46	7/6
- Source: CricketArchive, 18 February 2022

Yolandi van der Westhuizen (born 11 December 1981) is a South African former cricketer and current cricket coach. She played as a right-handed batter and wicket-keeper. She appeared in eight One Day Internationals and 12 Twenty20 Internationals for South Africa between 2009 and 2014. She played domestic cricket for Western Province and Boland.

In 2021, she was appointed as Head Coach of Boland's women's team, becoming the first woman to coach the side.
