= Khalipha Cele =

South African cricketer (born 1993)

Personal information
- Born: 19 March 1993 (age 33); Port Shepstone, South Africa
- Source: Cricinfo, 6 September 2015

Khalipha Cele (born 19 March 1993) is a South African cricketer. He was included in the KwaZulu-Natal cricket team for the 2015 Africa T20 Cup. In September 2018, he was named in KwaZulu-Natal's squad for the 2018 Africa T20 Cup. In September 2019, he was named in KwaZulu-Natal's squad for the 2019–20 CSA Provincial T20 Cup.
