= Solo Nqweni =

South African cricketer (born 1993)

Personal information
- Born: 20 October 1993 (age 33); Port Elizabeth, South Africa
- Source: ESPNcricinfo, 21 September 2016

Solo Nqweni (born 20 October 1993) is a South African first-class cricketer. He was included in Eastern Province's squad for the 2016 Africa T20 Cup. In September 2018, he was named in Eastern Province's squad for the 2018 Africa T20 Cup.

In July 2019, while playing club cricket for Aberdeenshire Cricket Club, Nqweni became ill with a mystery illness, before it was diagnosed as Guillain–Barré syndrome. He spent the next five months in a Scottish hospital before he was well enough to return home to South Africa in January 2020. The following month, the South Africa cricket team pledged 50,000 rand to help with Nqweni's rehabilitation. In May 2020, Nqweni announced that he had tested positive for COVID-19.
