= Ndumiso Mvelase =

South African cricketer (born 1996)

Personal information
- Born: 23 August 1996 (age 30); Johannesburg, South Africa
- Source: ESPNcricinfo, 21 September 2016

Ndumiso Mvelase (born 23 August 1996) is a South African first-class cricketer. He was included in Gauteng's squad for the 2016 Africa T20 Cup. In September 2018, he was named in Gauteng's squad for the 2018 Africa T20 Cup. In April 2021, he was named in North West's squad, ahead of the 2021–22 cricket season in South Africa.
