= Clifford Isaacs =

South African cricket umpire (born 1967)

Personal information
- Born: 10 June 1967 (age 59); Cradock, Eastern Cape, South Africa

Umpiring information
- WODIs umpired: 4 (2009–2011)
- WT20Is umpired: 5 (2009–2011)
- Source: Cricinfo, 28 February 2017

Clifford Isaacs (born 10 June 1967) is a South African cricket umpire. He stood as one of the umpires in the limited overs series between the South Africa and England women's teams in October 2011.

In South Africa domestic cricket, he has stood in matches in the 2016–17 Sunfoil 3-Day Cup and the 2016–17 CSA Provincial One-Day Challenge tournaments. He is part of Cricket South Africa's umpire panel for first-class matches.
