= Jeff Wolhuter =

South African cricket umpire (born 1981)

Personal information
- Born: 3 September 1981 (age 45); Cape Town, South Africa

Umpiring information
- Source: ESPNcricinfo, 21 October 2016

Jeff Wolhuter (born 3 September 1981) is a South African cricket umpire. He has stood in matches in the Sunfoil 3-Day Cup tournament.
