= Angelique Taai =

South African cricketer and coach (born 1987)

Personal information
- Full name: Angelique Samantha Taai
- Born: 31 March 1987 (age 39); King William's Town, Cape Province, South Africa
- Batting: Right-handed
- Bowling: Right-arm medium-fast
- Role: Bowler

International information
- National side: South Africa (2005–2010)
- ODI debut (cap 42): 13 March 2005 v England
- Last ODI: 12 October 2010 v Netherlands
- T20I debut (cap 20): 25 October 2009 v West Indies
- Last T20I: 16 October 2010 v Pakistan

Domestic team information
- Years: Team
- 2003/04–2018/19: Border

Career statistics
Competition	WODI	WT20I	WLA	WT20
Matches	13	7	142	37
Runs scored	60	21	2,814	738
Batting average	12.00	4.20	27.58	35.14
100s/50s	0/0	0/0	3/10	0/4
Top score	22*	11	138	89
Balls bowled	214	93	4,332	413
Wickets	2	6	118	22
Bowling average	61.00	19.50	19.69	14.90
5 wickets in innings	0	0	0	0
10 wickets in match	0	0	0	0
Best bowling	1/15	3/9	4/19	4/10
Catches/stumpings	0/–	1/–	46/3	4/1
- Source: CricketArchive, 19 February 2022

Angelique Samantha Taai (born 31 March 1987) is a South African former cricketer and current cricket coach. She played as a right-arm medium-fast bowler and right-handed batter, as well as occasionally keeping wicket. She appeared in 13 One Day Internationals and seven Twenty20 Internationals for South Africa between 2005 and 2010. She played domestic cricket for Border.

She is the current Head Coach of KwaZulu-Natal Coastal and Thistles.
