= List of Mpumalanga representative cricketers =

This is a list of cricketers who have played first-class, List A cricket, or Twenty20 cricket for the Mpumalanga cricket team in South Africa.

Mpumalanga, which represents Mpumalanga province in the north-east of South Africa, was awarded first-class cricket status ahead of the 2006–07 cricket season and played in the Provincial Three-Day Challenge first-class competition and One-Day Cup for a single season. After losing six of their eight first-class matches heavily, the team, along with Kei and Limpopo, lost their first-class status, Cricket South Africa (CSA) considering that their performance had been too weak for them to continue to hold first-class status. (Note: South Western Districts and KwaZulu-Natal Inland retained their first-class status having been awarded it at the same time as Mpumalanga, Kei, and Limpopo.)

The team played in the CSA Rural League during the 2010s, before being invited to take part in the 2018 Africa T20 Cup, making its top-class Twenty20 debut. From the 2019–20 season it competed in the CSA Provincial T20 Cup, the second division Twenty20 tournament, with matches holding official Twenty20 status. After a two-season trial period, during which Mpumalanga played in the second division first-class and List A competitions with the matches involving the team not considered to hold top-level status, it was promoted to first-class status again in October 2022, with matches played during the 2022–23 season having first-class or List A status. (Note: Limpopo competed on the same basis during this period and was promoted at the same time as Mpumalanga.)

This list includes the players who played first-class and List A cricket for Mpumalanga in 2006–07 and from 2022 to 2023, and Twenty20 cricket for the team from 2018 to 2019.

As of 13 July 2025

== A ==
- Glen Adams
- Jarred Alder
- Leonard Arendse
- Roger Arendse

== B ==
- Caleb Balich
- Matt Brink

== C ==
- Yassar Cook

== D ==
- Shane Dadswell
- Nhlanhla Dlamini
- Adriano dos Santos
- Gareth Dukes

== F ==
- Aubrey Ferreira
- Jared Fuchs

== G ==
- Mbasa Gqadushe

== H ==
- Sokat Hasrod
- Rubin Hermann
- Jon Hinrichsen
- Roelof Hugo

== J ==
- Jan Jordaan

== K ==
- Zakir Kathrada
- Kieran Kenny
- Alexander Kok
- Tumi Koto

== M ==
- Sifiso Mahima
- Siyabonga Mahima
- Bongani Mahlangu
- Gregory Mahlokoana
- Lizo Makhosi
- Musa Makhubela
- Desmond Makua
- Junior Makua
- Kurtlyn Mannikam
- Lucas Manzini
- Sinegugu Maseko
- Thomas Mashiane
- Themba Maupa
- Muhammed Mayet
- Ali Milanzi
- Akhulile Mkatu
- Edward Mogoto
- Karabo Mogotsi
- Kgaudise Molefe
- Lafras Moolman

== N ==
- Teunis Neethling
- Ronny Nevumbani
- Thula Ngcobo
- Gerald Ngwenyama
- Luvuyo Nkese
- Stuart Nkosi

== P ==
- Lindokuhle Pawuli
- Liam Peters

== R ==
- Jimmy Repsold
- Hermann Rolfes

== S ==
- Abednigo Sambo
- Blake Schraader
- Sydney Shokane
- Ngazibini Sigwili
- Jurie Snyman
- Maarten Steenkamp
- Zuan Swart

== T ==
- Ryan Tate
- Katlego Thena
- Musawenkosi Twala

== V ==
- Aldo van den Berg
- Paul van den Berg
- Luco van der Walt
- Benjamin van Niekerk
- Herman van Straaten
- Gerhardus Vosloo
- Jacques Vosloo

== W ==
- Justin Watson

== X ==
- Bamanye Xenxe

== Y ==
- Nonelela Yikha
- Codi Yusuf
