= 2021–22 CSA One-Day Cup =

Cricket tournament

- Dates: 11 March – 6 April 2022
- Administrator(s): Cricket South Africa
- Cricket format: List A (Note: Matches involving either Limpopo or Mpumalanga did not have List A status.)
- Tournament format(s): Round-robin
- Champions: Lions (Division 1); KwaZulu-Natal Inland (Division 2)
- Participants: 15
- Matches: 50
- Most runs: Heinrich Klaasen (448)
- Most wickets: Sisanda Magala (21)

The 2021–22 CSA One-Day Cup was a List A cricket competition that took place in South Africa in March and April 2022. It was the first edition of the tournament in the post-franchise era, and the first edition to return to a two-division league format. Domestic cricketing reforms were introduced in 2020 that discontinued the six franchise team format and announced a return to the more traditional provincial based system. Fifteen teams, split over the two divisions, competed in the one-day tournament.

In Division 1, five of the six teams who competed in the 2020–21 CSA Four-Day Franchise Series opted to retain their franchise brand, with only the former Cape Cobras reverting to their traditional Western Province name. They were joined in Division 1 by Boland and North West. Matches featuring either Limpopo or Mpumalanga, both in Division 2, did not have List A status.

On 30 March 2022, in the Division One match between Titans and North West, Titans scored 453/3 from their 50 overs, setting a record for the highest total in a List A match in South Africa.

Following the conclusion of the round-robin matches, Titans and Lions had reached the Division One final, with KwaZulu-Natal Inland and Northern Cape reaching the Division Two final. Lions won the Division One title, beating Titans by three wickets, with Reeza Hendricks scoring 157 runs. In the Division Two final, KwaZulu-Natal Inland beat Northern Cape by five wickets to win the match.

== Squads ==
The following squads were named for the Division One teams.

Boland	Dolphins	Knights	Lions	North West	Titans	Warriors	Western Province
Pieter Malan (c); Cebo Tshiki; Christiaan Jonker; Janneman Malan; Michael Copeland; Valentine Kitime; Ferisco Adams; Shaun von Berg; Clyde Fortuin (wk); Hlomla Hanabe (wk); Hardus Viljoen; Imran Manack; Siyabonga Mahima; Zakhele Qwabe; Ziyaad Abrahams	Marques Ackerman (c); David Miller; Junaid Syed; Khaya Zondo; Sarel Erwee; Slade van Staden; Thamsanga Kumalo; Waseem Rahman; Andile Phehlukwayo; Bryce Parsons; Eathan Bosch; Jason Smith; Ruan de Swardt; Grant Roelofsen (wk); Keegan Petersen (wk); Robin Smith (wk); Daryn Dupavillon; Irvin Modimokoane; Kerwin Mungroo; Keshav Maharaj; Lifa Ntanzi; Odirile Modimokoane; Ottniel Baartman; Prenelan Subrayen; Thando Ntini	Pite van Biljon (c); Farhaan Behardien; Jacques Snyman; Paballo Mogoera; Raynard van Tonder; Rilee Rossouw; Matthew Kleinveldt; Patrick Botha; Patrick Kruger; Dilivio Ridgaard (wk); Mangaliso Mosehle (wk); Nathan Roux; Wandile Makwetu (wk); Alfred Mothoa; Gerald Coetzee; Gregory Mahlokwana; Mbulelo Budaza; Migael Pretorius; Nealan van Heerden; Nhlakanipho Mpungose	Ryan Rickelton (c, wk); Dominic Hendricks; Joshua Richards; Kagiso Rapulana; Karabo Mogotsi; Levert Manje; Louren Steenkamp; Mitchell van Buuren; Muhammed Mayet; Reeza Hendricks; Codi Yusuf; Shane Dadswell; Sisanda Magala; Wiaan Mulder; Ruan Haasbroek (wk); Ayavuya Myoli; Bjorn Fortuin; Carmi le Roux; Duanne Olivier; Lutho Sipamla; Malusi Siboto; Tladi Bokako; Tshepo Ntuli	Nicky van den Bergh (c, wk); Heino Kuhn; Lesego Senokwane; Shaylen Pillay; Taheer Isaacs; Wesley Marshall; Christopher Britz; Delano Potgieter; Duan Jansen; Dwaine Pretorius; Ndumiso Mvelase; Senuran Muthusamy; Eben Botha (wk); Jason Oakes (wk); Bantu Dandala; Caleb Seleka; Chad Classen; Eldred Hawken; Heinrich Pieterse; Jesse Albanie; Johannes Diseko; Lwandiswa Zuma; Nono Pongolo	Dean Elgar (c); Aiden Markram; Donavon Ferreira; Grant Mokoena; Jiveshan Pillay; Jordan Hermann; Sibonelo Makhanya; Theunis de Bruyn; Ayabulela Gqamane; Corbin Bosch; Dayyaan Galiem; Dewald Brevis; Neil Brand; Gihahn Cloete (wk); Heinrich Klaasen (wk); Jan Hendrik Pretorius (wk); Quinton de Kock (wk); Aaron Phangiso; Bonga Chepkonga; Jarred Jardine; Junior Dala; Lizaad Williams; Lungi Ngidi; Okuhle Cele; Simon Harmer; Tabraiz Shamsi	Rudi Second (c, wk); Edward Moore; Kabelo Sekhukhune; Kyle Jacobs; Lesiba Ngoepe; Matthew Breetzke; Wihan Lubbe; Alindile Mhletywa; Diego Rosier; JJ Smuts; Marco Jansen; Sinethemba Qeshile (wk); Tristan Stubbs (wk); Akhona Mnyaka; Dane Paterson; Glenton Stuurman; Lizo Makhosi; Mthiwekhaya Nabe; Stefan Tait; Tiaan van Vuuren; Tsepo Ndwandwa	Zubayr Hamza (c); Bonga Makaka; Daniel Smith; Jonathan Bird; Liyema Waqu; Tony de Zorzi; Yaseen Vallie; George Linde; Kyle Simmonds; Mihlali Mpongwana; Nandre Burger; David Bedingham (wk); Gavin Kaplan; Kyle Verreynne (wk); Aviwe Mgijima; Basheer Walters; Beuran Hendricks; Kieran Kenny; Tshepo Moreki; Vernon Philander; Wayne Parnell; Yves Kamanzi

== Standing ==
=== Division 1 ===
Pos	Team	Pld	W	L	NR	Pts	NRR
1	Titans	7	5	1	1	24	1.331
2	Lions	7	4	2	1	19	0.765
3	North West	7	3	2	2	17	−0.516
4	Western Province	7	3	2	2	16	0.015
5	Knights	7	3	3	1	15	0.234
6	Warriors	7	2	4	1	12	0.118
7	Boland	7	2	4	1	10	−1.058
8	Dolphins	7	0	4	3	1	−1.583

Source: ESPNcricinfo

Advanced to the Finals

=== Division 2 ===
Pos	Team	Pld	W	L	NR	Pts	NRR
1	KwaZulu-Natal (Inland)	6	5	0	1	23	1.910
2	Northern Cape	6	4	2	0	16	0.197
3	South Western Districts	6	3	2	1	16	−0.274
4	Mpumalanga	6	3	3	0	12	−0.076
5	Border	6	1	3	2	9	0.589
6	Easterns	6	1	3	2	9	0.369
7	Limpopo	6	1	5	0	4	−1.651

Source: ESPN Cricinfo

Advanced to the Finals

== Division 1 fixtures ==
11 March 2022
Scorecard

North West; 243/9 (50 overs)	v	Western Province; 226 (48 overs)
Senuran Muthusamy 100 (106); Mihlali Mpongwana 3/31 (9 overs)		Jonathan Bird 116 (126); Dwaine Pretorius 3/40 (9 overs)

North West won by 17 runs
Senwes Park, Potchefstroom
Umpires: Brad White and Shaun George
Player of the match: Senuran Muthusamy (North West)

- Western Province won the toss and elected to field.
- Caleb Seleka (North West) made his List A debut.
- Senuran Muthusamy (North West) scored his first century in List A cricket.

11 March 2022
Scorecard

Lions; 266/8 (50 overs)	v	Warriors; 106 (24 overs)
Rassie van der Dussen 81 (101); Glenton Stuurman 3/47 (10 overs)		Diego Rosier 32 (42); Sisanda Magala 6/55 (10 overs)

Lions won by 160 runs
Wanderers Stadium, Johannesburg
Umpires: Bongani Jele and Stephen Harris
Player of the match: Sisanda Magala (Lions)

- Lions won the toss and elected to bat.

11 March 2022
Scorecard

Titans; 348/7 (50 overs)	v	Boland; 171 (35.4 overs)
Theunis de Bruyn 134 (119); Ferisco Adams 3/69 (10 overs)		Janneman Malan 93 (98); Lungi Ngidi 5/33 (9.4 overs)

Titans won by 177 runs
Centurion Park, Centurion
Umpires: Allahudien Paleker and Lubabalo Gcuma
Player of the match: Theunis de Bruyn (Titans)

- Boland won the toss and elected to field.
- Hlomla Hanabe and Michael Copeland (Boland) both made their List A debuts.

13 March 2022
Scorecard

Knights; 166/6 (25 overs)	v	Boland; 170/6 (24.3 overs)
Jacques Snyman 60 (46); Zakhele Qwabe 2/22 (4 overs)		Janneman Malan 69 (75); Patrick Botha 2/14 (1.3 overs)

Boland won by 4 wickets (DLS method)
Boland Park, Paarl
Umpires: Abdoellah Steenkamp and Bongani Jele
Player of the match: Janneman Malan (Boland)

- Boland won the toss and elected to field.
- Boland were set a revised target of 168 runs from 25 overs due to rain.
- Mbongiseni Mhlanga (Knights) made his List A debut.

13 March 2022
Scorecard

Warriors	v	North West

Match abandoned
St George's Park Cricket Ground, Port Elizabeth

- No toss.
- No play was possible due to rain.

13 March 2022
Scorecard

Dolphins; 215/6 (50 overs)	v	Titans; 216/9 (48.2 overs)
Khaya Zondo 62* (79); Tabraiz Shamsi 2/41 (10 overs)		Aiden Markram 70 (84); Prenelan Subrayen 3/33 (10 overs)

Titans won by 1 wicket
Kingsmead Cricket Ground, Durban
Umpires: Allahudien Paleker and Shaun George
Player of the match: Sibonelo Makhanya (Titans)

- Dolphins won the toss and elected to bat.

13 March 2022
Scorecard

Lions; 186 (43.2 overs)	v	Western Province; 190/9 (50 overs)
Rassie van der Dussen 67 (92); Tshepo Moreki 4/41 (8.2 overs)		George Linde 67* (87); Sisanda Magala 3/37 (10 overs)

Western Province won by 1 wicket
Wanderers Stadium, Johannesburg
Umpires: Arno Jacobs and Siphelele Gasa
Player of the match: George Linde (Western Province)

- Western Province won the toss and elected to field.

16 March 2022
Scorecard

Warriors; 173 (48.5 overs)	v	Western Province; 175/7 (42.3 overs)
Tiaan van Vuuren 47 (49); Tshepo Moreki 4/44 (10 overs)		Mihlali Mpongwana 61* (101); Tiaan van Vuuren 3/35 (10 overs)

Western Province won by 3 wickets
Newlands, Cape Town
Umpires: Murray Brown and Stephen Harris
Player of the match: Mihlali Mpongwana (Western Province)

- Western Province won the toss and elected to field.
- Daniel Smith and Gavin Kaplan (Western Province) both made their List A debuts.

16 March 2022
Scorecard

Boland; 202 (47.4 overs)	v	Dolphins; 25/0 (8.1 overs)
Stiaan van Zyl 109 (127); Eathan Bosch 4/37 (9.4 overs)		Sarel Erwee 19* (30)

No result
Kingsmead Cricket Ground, Durban
Umpires: Jurie Sadler and Shaun George

- Dolphins won the toss and elected to field.
- No further play was possible due to rain.

16 March 2022
Scorecard

Lions; 240/6 (50 overs)	v	Knights; 241/9 (49.5 overs)
Wiaan Mulder 108 (121); Gerald Coetzee 3/40 (10 overs)		Farhaan Behardien 86 (102); Tshepo Ntuli 3/34 (10 overs)

Knights won by 1 wicket
Mangaung Oval, Bloemfontein
Umpires: Arno Jacobs and Lubabalo Gcuma
Player of the match: Gerald Coetzee (Knights)

- Lions won the toss and elected to bat.

18 March 2022
Scorecard

North West; 260/7 (50 overs)	v	Dolphins; 181 (45.5 overs)
Christopher Britz 81 (108); Kerwin Mungroo 4/31 (10 overs)		Sarel Erwee 52 (66); Caleb Seleka 4/20 (10 overs)

North West won by 79 runs
Kingsmead Cricket Ground, Durban
Umpires: Arno Jacobs and Brad White
Player of the match: Caleb Seleka (North West)

- Dolphins won the toss and elected to field.

21 March 2022
Scorecard

Warriors; 329/6 (50 overs)	v	Dolphins; 121 (28.3 overs)
Diego Rosier 148 (127); Kerwin Mungroo 2/56 (10 overs)		Sarel Erwee 64 (49); Tsepo Ndwandwa 3/20 (6.3 overs)

Warriors won by 208 runs
St George's Park Cricket Ground, Port Elizabeth
Umpires: Abdoellah Steenkamp and Stephen Harris
Player of the match: Diego Rosier (Warriors)

- Dolphins won the toss and elected to field.
- Slade van Staden (Dolphins) made his List A debut.

21 March 2022
Scorecard

Knights; 279/7 (50 overs)	v	North West; 281/7 (50 overs)
Pite van Biljon 65 (64); Nono Pongolo 3/52 (9 overs)		Lesego Senokwane 65 (73); Jacques Snyman 3/42 (10 overs)

North West won by 3 wickets
Mangaung Oval, Bloemfontein
Umpires: Lubabalo Gcuma and Siphelele Gasa
Player of the match: Lesego Senokwane (North West)

- North West won the toss and elected to field.

21 March 2022
Scorecard

Boland; 224 (50 overs)	v	Lions; 225/4 (43 overs)
Pieter Malan 104 (125); Sisanda Magala 6/46 (10 overs)		Joshua Richards 67 (84); Shaun von Berg 2/54 (10 overs)

Lions won by 6 wickets
Boland Park, Paarl
Umpires: Arno Jacobs and Shaun George
Player of the match: Sisanda Magala (Lions)

- Lions won the toss and elected to field.

23 March 2022
Scorecard

Western Province; 280/6 (50 overs)	v	Dolphins; 4/0 (0.4 overs)
Tony de Zorzi 89 (110); Kerwin Mungroo 2/60 (8 overs)		Sarel Erwee 4* (4)

No result
Kingsmead Cricket Ground, Durban
Umpires: Brad White and Mazizi Gampu

- No further play was possible due to rain.
- Siya Plaatjie (Western Province) made his List A debut.

24 March 2022
Scorecard

Warriors; 306/7 (50 overs)	v	Titans; 308/9 (49.3 overs)
Wihan Lubbe 135 (127); Lizaad Williams 3/43 (10 overs)		Heinrich Klaasen 121 (85); Glenton Stuurman 3/42 (9.3 overs)

Titans won by 1 wicket
St George's Park Cricket Ground, Port Elizabeth
Umpires: Stephen Harris and Arno Jacobs
Player of the match: Heinrich Klaasen (Titans)

- Warriors won the toss and elected to bat.

25 March 2022
Scorecard

Boland; 251/8 (50 overs)	v	North West; 224 (49.1 overs)
Stiaan van Zyl 114 (141); Eldred Hawken 6/46 (10 overs)		Wesley Marshall 73 (87); Achille Cloete 3/31 (10 overs)

Boland won by 27 runs
Senwes Park, Potchefstroom
Umpires: Brad White and Shaun George
Player of the match: Pieter Malan (Boland)

- North West won the toss and elected to field.
- Eldred Hawken (North West) took his first five-wicket haul in List A cricket.

25 March 2022
Scorecard

Knights; 304/6 (50 overs)	v	Western Province; 266 (48.3 overs)
Matthew Kleinveldt 68 (84); Mihlali Mpongwana 3/61 (9 overs)		Daniel Smith 59 (60); Alfred Mothoa 3/47 (10 overs)

Knights won by 38 runs
Newlands, Cape Town
Umpires: Dennis Smith and Thomas Mokorosi
Player of the match: Matthew Kleinveldt (Knights)

- Knights won the toss and elected to bat.

27 March 2022
Scorecard

Dolphins; 224/8 (50 overs)	v	Lions; 228/7 (47 overs)
Andile Phehlukwayo 100* (117); Codi Yusuf 4/26 (10 overs)		Connor Esterhuizen 52 (58); Andile Phehlukwayo 2/37 (5 overs)

Lions won by 3 wickets
Wanderers Stadium, Johannesburg
Umpires: Abdoellah Steenkamp and Siphelele Gasa
Player of the match: Codi Yusuf (Lions)

- Lions won the toss and elected to field.
- Connor Esterhuizen (Lions) and Odirile Modimokoane (Dolphins) both made their List A debuts.
- Andile Phehlukwayo (Dolphins) scored his first century in List A cricket.

27 March 2022
Scorecard

Titans; 341/6 (50 overs)	v	Knights; 309 (44.1 overs)
Heinrich Klaasen 153 (127); Migael Pretorius 2/40 (10 overs)		Pite van Biljon 127* (110); Neil Brand 4/61 (10 overs)

Titans won by 32 runs
Centurion Park, Centurion
Umpires: Dennis Smith and Lubabalo Gcuma
Player of the match: Heinrich Klaasen (Titans)

- Knights won the toss and elected to field.
- Samuel Ruwisi (Titans) made his List A debut.

30 March 2022
Scorecard

Warriors; 264/9 (50 overs)	v	Knights; 266/3 (39.3 overs)
JJ Smuts 135 (137); Alfred Mothoa 4/45 (10 overs)		Rilee Rossouw 73 (47); Mthiwekhaya Nabe 1/42 (5.3 overs)

Knights won by 7 wickets
St George's Park Cricket Ground, Port Elizabeth
Umpires: Lubabalo Gcuma and Philip Vosloo
Player of the match: Rilee Rossouw (Knights)

- Knights won the toss and elected to field.

30 March 2022
Scorecard

Titans; 453/3 (50 overs)	v	North West; 253 (41.3 overs)
Theunis de Bruyn 179 (115); Nono Pongolo 2/72 (9 overs)		Shaylen Pillay 76* (98); Neil Brand 3/31 (6.3 overs)

Titans won by 200 runs
Centurion Park, Centurion
Umpires: Abongile Sodumo and Stephen Harris
Player of the match: Theunis de Bruyn (Titans)

- Titans won the toss and elected to bat.
- Bonga Chepkonga (Titans) made his List A debut.

1 April 2022
Scorecard

Western Province; 300/8 (50 overs)	v	Boland; 283 (48.4 overs)
Yaseen Vallie 102 (109); Ferisco Adams 4/54 (10 overs)		Stiaan van Zyl 66 (52); Basheeru-Deen Walters 2/48 (10 overs)

Western Province won by 17 runs
Newlands, Cape Town
Umpires: Brad White and Dennis Smith
Player of the match: Yaseen Vallie (Western Province)

- Boland won the toss and elected to field.
- Valentine Kitime (Boland) made his List A debut.
- Yaseen Vallie (Western Province) scored his first century in List A cricket.

1 April 2022
Scorecard

Titans; 145 (38.2 overs)	v	Lions; 147/9 (45 overs)
Gihahn Cloete 62* (92); Bjorn Fortuin 5/34 (9.2 overs)		Mitchell Van Buuren 44 (69); Neil Brand 3/22 (10 overs)

Lions won by 1 wicket
Wanderers Stadium, Johannesburg
Umpires: Arno Jacobs and Shaun George
Player of the match: Bjorn Fortuin (Lions)

- Titans won the toss and elected to bat.
- Bjorn Fortuin (Lions) took his first five-wicket haul in List A cricket.

3 April 2022
Scorecard

Warriors; 357/6 (50 overs)	v	Boland; 271 (45.2 overs)
Wihan Lubbe 162 (137); Hardus Viljoen 3/55 (10 overs)		Stiaan van Zyl 59 (59); JJ Smuts 3/51 (10 overs)

Warriors won by 86 runs
Boland Park, Paarl
Umpires: Godwin Von Willingh and Shaun George
Player of the match: Wihan Lubbe (Warriors)

- Boland won the toss and elected to field.
- Aphiwe Mnyanda and Joshua Chippendale (Warriors) both made their List A debuts.

3 April 2022
Scorecard

Dolphins; 205/9 (47.2 overs)	v	Knights
Grant Roelofsen 88 (108); Migael Pretorius 4/21 (10 overs)

No result
Mangaung Oval, Bloemfontein
Umpires: Abdoellah Steenkamp and Brad White

- Knights won the toss and elected to field.
- No further play was possible due to rain.

3 April 2022
Scorecard

North West	v	Lions

Match abandoned
Senwes Park, Potchefstroom
Umpires: Siphelele Gasa and Stephen Harris

- No toss.
- No play was possible due to rain.

3 April 2022
Scorecard

Titans; 110/2 (20 overs)	v	Western Province
Theunis de Bruyn 39 (38); Tshepo Moreki 1/29 (5 overs); Kyle Simmonds 1/29 (5 overs)

No result
Centurion Park, Centurion
Umpires: Lubabalo Gcuma and Ryan Hendricks

- Western Province won the toss and elected to field.
- No further play was possible due to rain.

== Division 2 fixtures ==
11 March 2022
Scorecard

Mpumalanga; 309/9 (50 overs)	v	Easterns; 248 (49 overs)
Benjamin van Niekerk 79 (87); Divan Posthumus 3/52 (8 overs)		Wesley Coulentianos 65 (94); Jon Hinrichsen 2/29 (7 overs)

Mpumalanga won by 61 runs
Willowmoore Park, Benoni
Umpires: Abongile Sodumo and Thomas Mokorosi

- Easterns won the toss and elected to field.

11 March 2022
Scorecard

Limpopo; 238/5 (50 overs)	v	KwaZulu-Natal Inland; 242/5 (43 overs)
Ludwig Kaestner 112 (150); Michael Erlank 1/32 (6 overs)		Michael Erlank 75* (79); Don Radebe 2/30 (8 overs)

KwaZulu-Natal Inland won by 5 wickets
Cricket Club Ground, Polokwane
Umpires: Marlon Jansen and Philip Vosloo

- KwaZulu-Natal Inland won the toss and elected to field.

13 March 2022
Scorecard

Border; 257/7 (50 overs)	v	Mpumalanga; 261/7 (42 overs)
Nonelela Yikha 87 (115); Jon Hinrichsen 3/51 (10 overs)		Glen Adams 87* (87); Joshua Dodd 2/37 (6 overs)

Mpumalanga won by 3 wickets
White River Country Club, White River
Umpires: Mazizi Gampu and Ryan Hendricks

- Border won the toss and elected to bat.

16 March 2022
Scorecard

Easterns; 299/7 (50 overs)	v	South Western Districts; 141 (33.5 overs)
Matthew Arnold 128 (128); Sean Whitehead 2/44 (10 overs)		Hanno Kotze 44 (59); Khwezi Gumede 5/32 (7.5 overs)

Easterns won by 158 runs
Willowmoore Park, Benoni
Umpires: Jan Erasmus and Jurie Sadler

- Easterns won the toss and elected to bat.
- Divan Posthumus (Easterns) made his List A debut.

18 March 2022
Scorecard

KwaZulu-Natal Inland; 251/7 (50 overs)	v	South Western Districts; 150 (35.3 overs)
Tshepang Dithole 101 (144); Onke Nyaku 3/45 (9 overs)		Blayde Capell 38 (50); Kyle Nipper 5/27 (8.3 overs)

KwaZulu-Natal Inland won by 101 runs
Recreation Ground, Oudtshoorn
Umpires: Abongile Sodumo and Godwin Von Willingh

- KwaZulu-Natal Inland won the toss and elected to bat.
- Michael Sclanders (KwaZulu-Natal Inland) made his List A debut.

18 March 2022
Scorecard

Easterns; 263/7 (50 overs)	v	Northern Cape; 265/6 (48.2 overs)
Grant Thomson 153* (152); Beyers Swanepoel 2/30 (10 overs)		Hanu Viljoen 67* (69); Clayton August 2/40 (10 overs)

Northern Cape won by 4 wickets
Diamond Oval, Kimberley
Umpires: Marlon Jansen and Siphelele Gasa

- Easterns won the toss and elected to bat.
- Hanu Viljoen (Northern Cape) made his List A debut.

20 March 2022
Scorecard

Border; 273/9 (50 overs)	v	Limpopo; 84 (24.1 overs)
Mncedisi Malika 79 (82); Malcolm Nofal 3/30 (10 overs)		Malcolm Nofal 20 (36); Phaphama Fojela 3/6 (5 overs)

Border won by 189 runs
Buffalo Park, East London
Umpires: Abongile Sodumo and Gladman Gaseba

- Limpopo won the toss and elected to field.

21 March 2022
Scorecard

Northern Cape; 266 (49.2 overs)	v	KwaZulu-Natal Inland; 267/5 (44.5 overs)
Ernest Kemm 75 (84); Keith Dudgeon 5/34 (9.2 overs)		Cameron Delport 153* (135); Andrew Rasemene 1/37 (6 overs)

KwaZulu-Natal Inland won by 5 wickets
City Oval, Pietermaritzburg
Umpires: Dennis Smith and Ryan Hendricks

- KwaZulu-Natal Inland won the toss and elected to field.

23 March 2022
Scorecard

Limpopo; 62 (25.1 overs)	v	South Western Districts; 64/2 (17.5 overs)
Nyiko Shikwambana 25* (48); Sean Whitehead 7/13 (9.1 overs)		Yaseen Valli 18* (40); Sithembile Langa 1/8 (6 overs)

South Western Districts won by 8 wickets
Recreation Ground, Oudtshoorn
Umpires: Abdoellah Steenkamp and Gladman Gaseba

- Limpopo won the toss and elected to bat.

24 March 2022
Scorecard

Northern Cape; 345/9 (50 overs)	v	Mpumalanga; 301 (50 overs)
Ernest Kemm 109 (101); Kgaudisa Molefe 3/48 (10 overs)		Benjamin van Niekerk 75 (90); Beyers Swanepoel 3/42 (8 overs)

Northern Cape won by 44 runs
White River Country Club, White River
Umpires: Murray Brown and Philip Vosloo

- Mpumalanga won the toss and elected to field.

25 March 2022
Scorecard

Border	v	Easterns

Match abandoned
Buffalo Park, East London
Umpires: Bongani Ntshebe and Jurie Sadler

- No toss.
- No play was possible due to rain.

27 March 2022
Scorecard

KwaZulu-Natal Inland; 251 (49.3 overs)	v	Border; 230 (48.5 overs)
Michael Erlank 83 (105); Jason Niemand 3/33 (10 overs)		Jason Niemand 88 (105); Kyle Nipper 3/45 (10 overs)

KwaZulu-Natal Inland won by 21 runs
City Oval, Pietermaritzburg
Umpires: Ryan Hendricks and Thomas Mokorosi

- Border won the toss and elected to field.

27 March 2022
Scorecard

Northern Cape; 231/9 (50 overs)	v	South Western Districts; 235/4 (49.4 overs)
Evan Jones 70 (66); Sintu Majeza 4/50 (10 overs)		Jean du Plessis 101* (143); Beyers Swanepoel 3/41 (10 overs)

South Western Districts won by 6 wickets
Recreation Ground, Oudtshoorn
Umpires: Abongile Sodumo and Jan Erasmus

- Northern Cape won the toss and elected to bat.

27 March 2022
Scorecard

Mpumalanga; 263/8 (50 overs)	v	Limpopo; 232/8 (50 overs)
Rubin Hermann 114 (127); Juandre Scheepers 2/41 (9 overs)		Ludwig Kaestner 73 (94); Bamanye Xenxe 4/33 (9 overs)

Mpumalanga won by 31 runs
Cricket Club Ground, Polokwane
Umpires: Mazizi Gampu and Murray Brown

- Mpumalanga won the toss and elected to bat.

30 March 2022
Scorecard

Mpumalanga; 192 (46.4 overs)	v	South Western Districts; 198/5 (36.2 overs)
Benjamin van Niekerk 62 (97); Renaldo Meyer 3/32 (8.4 overs)		Hanno Kotze 54* (69); Glen Adams 2/44 (10 overs)

South Western Districts won by 5 wickets
White River Country Club, White River
Umpires: Jurie Sadler and Siphelele Gasa

- South Western Districts won the toss and elected to field.

30 March 2022
Scorecard

Border; 242/7 (50 overs)	v	Northern Cape; 247/8 (48.4 overs)
Marco Marais 65 (103); Evan Jones 3/52 (8 overs)		Beyers Swanepoel 52* (33); Jade de Klerk 3/38 (7 overs)

Northern Cape won by 2 wickets
Diamond Oval, Kimberley
Umpires: Abdoellah Steenkamp and Murray Brown

- Northern Cape won the toss and elected to field.

1 April 2022
Scorecard

Mpumalanga; 172 (42 overs)	v	KwaZulu-Natal Inland; 175/5 (43.1 overs)
Benjamin van Niekerk 66* (80); Thula Ngcobo 4/32 (7 overs)		Luke Schlemmer 76 (114); Blake Schraader 2/27 (9 overs)

KwaZulu-Natal Inland won by 5 wickets
City Oval, Pietermaritzburg
Umpires: Godwin Von Willingh and Mazizi Gampu

- KwaZulu-Natal Inland won the toss and elected to field.

1 April 2022
Scorecard

Easterns; 242 (49.5 overs)	v	Limpopo; 246/5 (48.1 overs)
Divan Posthumus 60 (58); Juandre Scheepers 3/46 (9.5 overs)		Malcolm Nofal 86* (109); Wesley Coulentianos 1/7 (1 over)

Limpopo won by 5 wickets
Cricket Club Ground, Polokwane
Umpires: Jan Erasmus and Ryan Hendricks

- Limpopo won the toss and elected to field.

3 April 2022
Scorecard

Border	v	South Western Districts

Match abandoned
Buffalo Park, East London
Umpires: Bongani Ntshebe and Jurie Sadler

- No toss.
- No play was possible due to rain.

3 April 2022
Scorecard

Easterns; 9/0 (2.3 overs)	v	KwaZulu-Natal Inland
Musawenkosi Twala 8* (11)

No result
Willowmoore Park, Benoni
Umpires: Dennis Smith and Mazizi Gampu

- KwaZulu-Natal Inland won the toss and elected to field.
- No further play was possible due to rain.
- Musawenkosi Twala, Nhlanhla Mashigo and Sinenhlanhla Zwane (Easterns) all made their List A debuts.

3 April 2022
Scorecard

Northern Cape; 198/6 (23 overs)	v	Limpopo; 177/8 (23 overs)
Aubrey Swanepoel 102* (47); Malcolm Nofal 2/37 (4 overs)		Thomas Hobson 40 (29); Evan Jones 4/26 (5 overs)

Northern Cape won by 21 runs
Diamond Oval, Kimberley
Umpires: Philip Vosloo and Thomas Mokorosi

- Limpopo won the toss and elected to field.

== Finals ==
Division One
6 April 2022
Scorecard

Titans; 318/6 (50 overs)	v	Lions; 321/7 (49.1 overs)
Corbin Bosch 79* (59); Codi Yusuf 3/59 (10 overs)		Reeza Hendricks 157 (136); Tabraiz Shamsi 3/79 (10 overs)

Lions won by 3 wickets
Centurion Park, Centurion
Umpires: Lubabalo Gcuma and Stephen Harris

- Titans won the toss and elected to bat.
- Ronan Hermann (Titans) made his List A debut.

Division Two
8 April 2022
Scorecard

Northern Cape; 254/7 (50 overs)	v	KwaZulu-Natal Inland; 255/5 (47.5 overs)
Rivaldo Moonsamy 77 (78); Keith Dudgeon 3/41 (9 overs)		Tshepang Dithole 93 (110); Ernest Kemm 2/26 (5 overs)

KwaZulu-Natal Inland won by 5 wickets
City Oval, Pietermaritzburg
Umpires: Arno Jacobs and Siphelele Gasa

- KwaZulu-Natal Inland won the toss and elected to field.
