= 2020–21 CSA Provincial One-Day Challenge =

Cricket tournament

- Dates: 27 February – 23 March 2021
- Administrator: Cricket South Africa
- Cricket format: List A (Note: Matches involving either Limpopo, Mpumalanga or the South Africa under-19 cricket team did not have List A status.)
- Tournament format: Round-robin
- Participants: 16
- Matches: 24

The 2020–21 CSA Provincial One-Day Challenge was a domestic one-day cricket tournament that was played in South Africa in February and March 2021. Free State and Northern Cape were the defending champions, after the title was shared due to the COVID-19 pandemic.

The first matches were scheduled to start on 10 January 2021, however the start of the season was delayed until February due to the pandemic. Initially the tournament was to be played between the fifteen South African provincial teams, split into two groups. However, after the tournament restarted in February 2021, Cricket South Africa (CSA) confirmed that the South Africa under-19 cricket team would also be included in the competition. CSA issued a revised schedule for the tournament, with all the matches being held in a bio-secure environment. Matches involving either Limpopo, Mpumalanga or the South Africa under-19 team did not have List A status.

== Teams ==
The teams were placed into the following groups:

- Pool A: Boland, Border, KwaZulu-Natal, South Western Districts
- Pool B: Easterns, Free State, KwaZulu-Natal Inland, Limpopo
- Pool C: Northerns, Northern Cape, South Africa Under-19s, Western Province
- Pool D: Eastern Province, Gauteng, Mpumalanga, North West

== Fixtures ==
=== Pool A ===
27 February 2021
Scorecard

KwaZulu-Natal; 298/4 (50 overs)	v	Boland; 249/8 (50 overs)
Michael Erlank 102 (113); Kobus Scholtz 1/40 (10 overs)		Isma-eel Gafieldien 126 (137); Keith Dudgeon 4/44 (10 overs)

KwaZulu-Natal won by 49 runs
Boland Park, Paarl
Umpires: Abongile Sodumo and Godwin Von Willingh

- Boland won the toss and elected to field.

27 February 2021
Scorecard

South Western Districts; 189/7 (50 overs)	v	Border; 192/7 (43.4 overs)
Jhedli van Briesies 48 (68); Jason Niemand 4/36 (10 overs)		Mncedisi Malika 64* (93); Tsepo Ndwandwa 3/39 (10 overs)

Border won by 3 wickets
Stellenbosch University 1, Stellenbosch
Umpires: Abdoellah Steenkamp and Murray Brown

- Border won the toss and elected to field.

28 February 2021
Scorecard

South Western Districts; 272/7 (50 overs)	v	Boland; 226 (48.5 overs)
Jean du Plessis 83 (77); Khanya Dilima 3/39 (10 overs)		Warwick Abrahim 37 (40); Kirwin Christoffels 2/24 (6.5 overs)

South Western Districts won by 46 runs
Boland Park, Paarl
Umpires: Abdoellah Steenkamp and Abongile Sodumo

- Boland won the toss and elected to field.
- Khanya Dilima (Boland), Levin Muller and Sintu Majeza (South Western Districts) all made their List A debuts.

28 February 2021
Scorecard

KwaZulu-Natal; 279/6 (50 overs)	v	Border; 210 (43 overs)
Jason Oakes 88* (100); Clayton Bosch 2/69 (10 overs)		Jason Niemand 58 (75); Smangaliso Nhlebela 5/40 (10 overs)

KwaZulu-Natal won by 69 runs
Stellenbosch University 1, Stellenbosch
Umpires: A Murray and Gladman Gaseba

- Border won the toss and elected to field.
- Nhlakanipho Mpungose and Theesan Naicker (KwaZulu-Natal) both made their List A debuts.

1 March 2021
Scorecard

KwaZulu-Natal; 295/7 (50 overs)	v	South Western Districts; 125 (25 overs)
Blayde Capell 112 (134); Tsepo Ndwandwa 2/38 (10 overs)		Jean du Plessis 40 (44); Daelen Fynn 5/15 (5 overs)

KwaZulu-Natal won by 137 runs (DLS method)
Boland Park, Paarl
Umpires: Gladman Gaseba and Godwin Von Willingh

- KwaZulu-Natal won the toss and elected to bat.
- Daelen Fynn and Wonder Mtolo (KwaZulu-Natal) both made their List A debuts.

1 March 2021
Scorecard

Border; 146 (44.4 overs)	v	Boland; 136/0 (27.5 overs)
Jason Niemand 40 (71); Khanya Dilima 5/26 (8.4 overs)		Cebo Tshiki 64* (81)

Boland won by 10 wickets (DLS method)
Stellenbosch University 1, Stellenbosch
Umpires: Abongile Sodumo and Murray Brown

- Border won the toss and elected to bat.
- Bhongolwethu Makaleni (Border) and Lindley Hendricks (Boland) both made their List A debuts.

=== Pool B ===
27 February 2021
Scorecard

KwaZulu-Natal Inland; 187 (49.1 overs)	v	Free State; 188/2 (36.5 overs)
Andile Mokgakane 78 (109); Romano Terblanche 5/30 (9.1 overs)		Dilivio Ridgaard 86* (120); Thula Ngcobo 1/14 (6 overs)

Free State won by 8 wickets
Mangaung Oval, Bloemfontein
Umpires: Marlon Jansen and Philip Vosloo

- Free State won the toss and elected to field.

27 February 2021
Scorecard

Limpopo; 130 (33.1 overs)	v	Easterns; 131/5 (25 overs)
Ludwig Kaestner 47 (85); Lance Humphrey 3/39 (7 overs)		Sizwe Masondo 40* (63); Michael Mahlabe 3/38 (10 overs)

Easterns won by 5 wickets
Central University of Technology, ABSA Oval, Bloemfontein

- Easterns won the toss and elected to field.

28 February 2021
Scorecard

KwaZulu-Natal Inland; 193 (44.4 overs)	v	Easterns; 197/6 (44.1 overs)
Sohail Mahmoud 62 (81); Jean-Pierre Bloem 4/19 (10 overs)		Yaseen Valli 48 (109); Kurtlyn Mannikam 2/32 (10 overs)

Easterns won by 4 wickets
Central University of Technology, ABSA Oval, Bloemfontein

- Easterns won the toss and elected to field.
- Danie Rossouw and Jean-Pierre Bloem (Easterns) both made their List A debuts.

28 February 2021
Scorecard

Free State; 198 (48.5 overs)	v	Limpopo; 177 (40.2 overs)
Dilivio Ridgaard 43 (68); Sihle Mginywa 5/28 (9 overs)		Ludwig Kaestner 45 (50); Petrus du Plessis 4/19 (7 overs)

Free State won by 21 runs
Mangaung Oval, Bloemfontein
Umpires: Philip Vosloo and Ryan Hendricks

- Free State won the toss and elected to bat.

1 March 2021
Scorecard

KwaZulu-Natal Inland; 215/9 (50 overs)	v	Limpopo; 216/1 (43.4 overs)
Luke Schlemmer 81 (121); Thomas Mayes 4/44 (10 overs)		Ludwig Kaestner 100* (127); Nduduzo Mfoza 1/53 (10 overs)

Limpopo won by 9 wickets
Mangaung Oval, Bloemfontein
Umpires: Dennis Smith and Philip Vosloo

- Limpopo won the toss and elected to field.

1 March 2021
Scorecard

Easterns	v	Free State

Match abandoned
Central University of Technology, ABSA Oval, Bloemfontein

- No toss.

=== Pool C ===
21 March 2021
Scorecard

Northerns; 131 (38.1 overs)	v	Northern Cape; 65 (24.4 overs)
Jiveshan Pillay 40 (50); Aubrey Swanepoel 3/31 (10 overs)		Blake Schraader 17 (31); Gregory Mahlokwana 3/0 (2.4 overs)

Northerns won by 66 runs
Diamond Oval, Kimberley
Umpires: Philip Vosloo and Siphelele Gasa

- Northern Cape won the toss and elected to field.
- Benjamin Van Rensburg, Orapeleng Motlhoaring and Richard Ntumka (Northern Cape) all made their List A debuts.

21 March 2021
Scorecard

Western Province; 130 (36.1 overs)	v	South Africa Under-19s; 131/9 (38.1 overs)
Jack Newby 51 (61); Liam Alder 4/16 (7.1 overs)		Mickey Copeland 47 (68); Yves Kamanzi 4/27 (10 overs)

South Africa Under-19s won by 1 wicket
Country Club B Field, Kimberley

- Western Province won the toss and elected to bat.

22 March 2021
Scorecard

Western Province; 136 (46.1 overs)	v	Northerns; 139/2 (27.2 overs)
Zac Elkin 24 (65); Achille Cloete 4/17 (10 overs)		Rubin Hermann 72* (88); Lehan Botha 1/24 (5.2 overs)

Northerns won by 8 wickets
Diamond Oval, Kimberley
Umpires: Marlon Jansen and Ryan Hendricks

- Northerns won the toss and elected to field.
- Kai Curran and Lehan Botha (Western Province) both made their List A debuts.

22 March 2021
Scorecard

Northern Cape; 142 (42.5 overs)	v	South Africa Under-19s; 120 (45 overs)
Benjamin Van Rensburg 25* (53); Nathan Steyn 3/14 (7.5 overs)		Jordan Hermann 37 (97); Aubrey Swanepoel 4/22 (10 overs)

Northern Cape won by 22 runs
Country Club B Field, Kimberley
Umpires: Jurie Sadler and Siphelele Gasa

- South Africa Under-19s won the toss and elected to field.

23 March 2021
Scorecard

Northerns; 102 (35.3 overs)	v	South Africa Under-19s; 103/2 (16.4 overs)
Gionne Koopman 23 (55); Jan Coetzer 5/28 (8.3 overs)		Dewald Brevis 54* (40); Gionne Koopman 1/9 (3 overs)

South Africa Under-19s won by 8 wickets
Diamond Oval, Kimberley
Umpires: Philip Vosloo and Ryan Hendricks

- South Africa Under-19s won the toss and elected to field.

23 March 2021
Scorecard

Western Province; 248/7 (50 overs)	v	Northern Cape; 250/3 (46 overs)
Andre Malan 77 (87); Beyers Swanepoel 4/40 (10 overs)		Ernest Kemm 100* (135); Jesse Christensen 1/24 (5 overs)

Northern Cape won by 7 wickets
Country Club B Field, Kimberley
Umpires: Lauren Agenbag and Marlon Jansen

- Western Province won the toss and elected to bat.
- Lwando Tywaku (Western Province) made his List A debut.

=== Pool D ===
21 March 2021
Scorecard

Eastern Province; 229/9 (50 overs)	v	North West; 230/4 (47.1 overs)
Joshua van Heerden 47 (72); Katleho Leokaoke 2/28 (7 overs)		Eben Botha 86 (66); Marcello Piedt 1/34 (8 overs)

North West won by 6 wickets
Senwes Park, Potchefstroom
Umpires: F Von Willingh and Mazizi Gampu

- Eastern Province won the toss and elected to bat.
- Christopher Britz (North West) and Luke Beaufort (Eastern Province) both made their List A debuts.

21 March 2021
Scorecard

Mpumalanga; 278 (49.4 overs)	v	Gauteng; 243/3 (35.5 overs)
Alexander Kok 96 (94); Aristides Karvelas 2/52 (9 overs)		Levert Manje 110* (98); Maarten Steenkamp 1/32 (7 overs)

Gauteng won by 7 wickets (DLS method)
North-West University No1 Ground, Potchefstroom
Umpires: Abongile Sodumo and Jan Erasmus

- Gauteng won the toss and elected to field.

22 March 2021
Scorecard

Eastern Province; 228/6 (50 overs)	v	Gauteng; 229/7 (39.3 overs)
Joshua van Heerden 89 (109); Bryce Parsons 2/33 (10 overs)		Mitchell Van Buuren 101 (93); Marcello Piedt 3/49 (8 overs)

Gauteng won by 3 wickets
Senwes Park, Potchefstroom
Umpires: Abongile Sodumo and Mazizi Gampu

- Gauteng won the toss and elected to field.
- Emmanuel Motswiri and Levert Manje (Gauteng) both made their List A debuts.

22 March 2021
Scorecard

North West; 273/7 (50 overs)	v	Mpumalanga; 173 (42.2 overs)
Nicholas Smit 102 (115); Musa Makhubela 4/53 (10 overs)		Benjamin van Niekerk 53 (59); Jon Hinrichsen 4/24 (6 overs)

North West won by 100 runs
North-West University No1 Ground, Potchefstroom
Umpires: Gladman Gaseba and Jan Erasmus

- North West won the toss and elected to bat.

23 March 2021
Scorecard

North West; 205 (49.4 overs)	v	Gauteng; 208/4 (47.5 overs)
Eben Botha 76 (102); Nono Pongolo 4/31 (9 overs)		Wesley Marshall 58 (78); Jon Hinrichsen 2/41 (10 overs)

Gauteng won by 6 wickets
Senwes Park, Potchefstroom
Umpires: Gladman Gaseba and Mazizi Gampu

- North West won the toss and elected to bat.
- Glen Adams (North West) made his List A debut.

23 March 2021
Scorecard

Eastern Province; 256/8 (50 overs)	v	Mpumalanga; 117 (23.2 overs)
Luke Beaufort 88 (98); Kieran Kenny 4/43 (10 overs)		Liam Peters 28 (26); Thomas Kaber 5/23 (5 overs)

Eastern Province won by 139 runs
North-West University No1 Ground, Potchefstroom
Umpires: Abongile Sodumo and Godwin Von Willingh

- Mpumalanga won the toss and elected to field.
