= Chibuike =

Chibụike
- Gender: Male
- Language: Igbo

Origin
- Origin: Igbo
- Meaning: Chi is strength
- Region of origin: Igboland

Chibụike // is an Igbo male given name and surname which means "chi is strength". Similarly, there is the name Chibụikem: "chi is my strength".

== Given name ==
- Chibuike Josh Alfred, Nigerian comedian known as Josh2Funny
- Chibuike Rotimi Amaechi (born 1965), Nigerian politician
- Chibuike Iteogu (born 1985), Nigerian cricketer
- Chibuike Nwaiwu (born 2003), Nigerian footballer
- Chibuike Ohizu (born 1996), Nigerian footballer
- Chibuike Okeke (born 1979), Nigerian footballer

== Second name ==
- Levi Chibuike Ajuonuma (1959–2012), Nigerian academic and journalist
- Yul Chibuike Daniel Edochie (born 1982), Nigerian actor

== Surname ==
- Francis Chibuike (born 1993), Nigerian footballer
- John Chibuike (born 1988), Nigerian footballer
- Sunday Chibuike (born 1982), Nigerian footballer
