= Michael van Rensburg =

South African cricketer (born 1997)

Personal information
- Born: 18 December 1997 (age 28)
- Source: Cricinfo, 14 September 2018

Michael van Rensburg (born 18 December 1997) is a South African cricketer. He made his Twenty20 debut for Limpopo in the 2018 Africa T20 Cup on 14 September 2018.
