= Leighton Swarts =

South African cricketer

Personal information
- Full name: Leighton Swarts
- Source: ESPNcricinfo, 15 January 2017

Leighton Swarts is a South African cricketer. He made his first-class debut for Boland in the 2016–17 Sunfoil 3-Day Cup on 12 January 2017. In September 2018, he was named in Limpopo's squad for the 2018 Africa T20 Cup. He made his Twenty20 debut for Limpopo in the 2018 Africa T20 Cup on 14 September 2018.
