= 2020–21 CSA T20 Challenge =

Cricket tournament

- Dates: 19 – 28 February 2021
- Administrator: Cricket South Africa
- Cricket format: Twenty20
- Tournament format(s): Round-robin and Final
- Host: South Africa
- Champions: Imperial Lions (4th title)
- Runners-up: Dolphins
- Participants: 6
- Matches: 17
- Most runs: Reeza Hendricks (257)
- Most wickets: Sisanda Magala (13)

The 2020–21 CSA T20 Challenge was the seventeenth season of the CSA T20 Challenge, established by Cricket South Africa. The tournament was played during February 2021, with all the matches taking place at the Kingsmead Cricket Ground in Durban. It replaced the 2020 edition of the Mzansi Super League, which was cancelled due to the COVID-19 pandemic. On 5 February 2021, Cricket South Africa confirmed the fixtures for the tournament. Lions were the defending champions.

Following the conclusion of the group stage, Lions and Warriors advanced to the play-off final, with Dolphins finishing top of the group and progressing directly to the tournament's final. In the play-off match, Lions beat Warriors by seven wickets. In the final, Lions retained their title, beating Dolphins by four wickets.

== Squads ==
On 15 February 2021, Cricket South Africa confirmed all the squads for the tournament.

Cape Cobras	Dolphins	Knights	Lions	Titans	Warriors
Tony de Zorzi (c); Ziyaad Abrahams; Corbin Bosch; Nandre Burger; Zubayr Hamza; Hlomla Hanabe; Christiaan Jonker; George Linde; Siyabonga Mahima; Janneman Malan; Imran Manack; Tshepo Moreki; Onke Nyaku; Calvin Savage; Jason Smith; Kyle Verreynne	Keshav Maharaj (c); Ottniel Baartman; Eathan Bosch; Ruan de Swardt; Daryn Dupavillon; Sarel Erwee; Robbie Frylinck; David Miller; Mangaliso Mosehle; Kerwin Mungroo; Senuran Muthusamy; Keegan Petersen; Andile Phehlukwayo; Grant Roelofsen; Prenelan Subrayen; Khaya Zondo	Pite van Biljon (c); Ferisco Adams; Farhaan Behardien; Mbulelo Budaza; Gerald Coetzee; Andries Gous; Matthew Kleinveldt; Patrick Kruger; Wandile Makwetu; Grant Mokoena; Alfred Mothoa; Migael Pretorius; Jacques Snyman; Raynard van Tonder; Jonathan Vandiar; Shaun von Berg	Temba Bavuma (c); Bjorn Fortuin; Ruan Haasbroek; Eldred Hawken; Beuran Hendricks; Reeza Hendricks; Sisanda Magala; Wiaan Mulder; Aaron Phangiso; Delano Potgieter; Dwaine Pretorius; Kagiso Rabada; Ryan Rickelton; Malusi Siboto; Lutho Sipamla; Rassie van der Dussen	Heinrich Klaasen (c); Okuhle Cele; Junior Dala; Henry Davids; Theunis de Bruyn; Dean Elgar; Dayyaan Galiem; Simon Harmer; Gregory Mahlokwana; Sibonelo Makhanya; Aiden Markram; Chris Morris; Lungi Ngidi; Tabraiz Shamsi; Grant Thomson; Lizaad Williams	Sinethemba Qeshile (c); Gihahn Cloete; Jade de Klerk; Ayabulela Gqamane; Marco Jansen; Wihan Lubbe; Lizo Makhosi; Marco Marais; Mthiwekhaya Nabe; Anrich Nortje; Lesiba Ngoepe; Tshepo Ntuli; JJ Smuts; Tristan Stubbs; Glenton Stuurman; Stefan Tait

== Points table ==
Pos	Team	Pld	W	L	NR	BP	Pts	NRR
1	Dolphins	5	5	0	0	1	21	0.815
2	Lions	5	4	1	0	0	16	0.078
3	Warriors	5	2	3	0	1	9	0.261
4	Titans	5	2	3	0	0	8	−0.299
5	Cape Cobras	5	1	4	0	0	4	−0.149
6	Knights	5	1	4	0	0	4	−0.696

Source: Cricinfo

Advanced to the Final Advanced to the Play-off Final

== Fixtures ==
=== Round-robin ===
19 February 2021
Scorecard

Knights; 116 (16.2 overs)	v	Titans; 120/4 (17.1 overs)
Andries Gous 35 (19); Tabraiz Shamsi 3/20 (4 overs)		Heinrich Klaasen 54* (40); Migael Pretorius 3/26 (4 overs)

Titans won by 6 wickets
Kingsmead Cricket Ground, Durban
Umpires: Allahudien Paleker and Arno Jacobs

- Knights won the toss and elected to bat.

19 February 2021
Scorecard

Dolphins; 155/8 (20 overs)	v	Cape Cobras; 141/7 (20 overs)
Khaya Zondo 59 (39); Siyabonga Mahima 4/18 (3 overs)		Christiaan Jonker 41* (25); Keshav Maharaj 4/15 (4 overs)

Dolphins won by 14 runs
Kingsmead Cricket Ground, Durban
Umpires: Bongani Jele and Stephen Harris

- Dolphins won the toss and elected to bat.
- Siyabonga Mahima (Cape Cobras) took a hat-trick.

20 February 2021
Scorecard

Warriors; 157 (19.5 overs)	v	Lions; 159/6 (19.2 overs)
Sinethemba Qeshile 33 (28); Sisanda Magala 4/37 (3.5 overs)		Rassie van der Dussen 64 (41); Ayabulela Gqamane 3/20 (3 overs)

Lions won by 4 wickets
Kingsmead Cricket Ground, Durban
Umpires: Lubabalo Gcuma and Siphelele Gasa

- Warriors won the toss and elected to bat.
- Lizo Makhosi (Warriors) made his T20 debut.

20 February 2021
Scorecard

Knights; 144/5 (20 overs)	v	Dolphins; 145/6 (18.1 overs)
Pite van Biljon 72* (54); Robert Frylinck 2/11 (3 overs)		Khaya Zondo 35* (31); Ferisco Adams 2/26 (3 overs)

Dolphins won by 4 wickets
Kingsmead Cricket Ground, Durban
Umpires: Brad White and Shaun George

- Knights won the toss and elected to bat.

21 February 2021
Scorecard

Titans; 148/6 (20 overs)	v	Cape Cobras; 132 (20 overs)
Sibonelo Makhanya 47 (33); George Linde 2/23 (4 overs)		George Linde 37 (21); Lungi Ngidi 3/18 (4 overs)

Titans won by 16 runs
Kingsmead Cricket Ground, Durban
Umpires: Arno Jacobs and Siphelele Gasa

- Titans won the toss and elected to bat.

21 February 2021
Scorecard

Warriors; 143/5 (20 overs)	v	Dolphins; 128/2 (18 overs)
Sinethemba Qeshile 47* (38); Ottniel Baartman 2/31 (4 overs)		Keegan Petersen 58* (56); Ayabulela Gqamane 1/15 (3 overs)

Dolphins won by 3 runs (DLS method)
Kingsmead Cricket Ground, Durban
Umpires: Allahudien Paleker and Stephen Harris

- Warriors won the toss and elected to bat.
- Dolphins were set a revised target of 126 runs from 18 overs due to rain.
- Tristan Stubbs (Warriors) made his T20 debut.

22 February 2021
Scorecard

Cape Cobras; 167/5 (20 overs)	v	Knights; 169/7 (20 overs)
Zubayr Hamza 77* (49); Shaun von Berg 2/23 (4 overs)		Raynard van Tonder 42 (40); Siyabonga Mahima 2/31 (4 overs)

Knights won by 3 wickets
Kingsmead Cricket Ground, Durban
Umpires: Lubabalo Gcuma and Shaun George

- Cape Cobras won the toss and elected to bat.

22 February 2021
Scorecard

Lions; 124/4 (16.2 overs)	v	Titans; 112/8 (15 overs)
Reeza Hendricks 39 (28); Lizaad Williams 1/19 (2.2 overs)		Junior Dala 21 (12); Beuran Hendricks 2/7 (3 overs)

Lions won by 18 runs (DLS method)
Kingsmead Cricket Ground, Durban
Umpires: Bongani Jele and Brad White

- Lions won the toss and elected to bat.
- Titans were set a revised target of 131 runs from 15 overs due to rain.

23 February 2021
Scorecard

Cape Cobras; 181/5 (20 overs)	v	Warriors; 157 (19.2 overs)
Zubayr Hamza 57 (45); Anrich Nortje 2/30 (4 overs)		Marco Jansen 47 (36); George Linde 4/25 (4 overs)

Cape Cobras won by 24 runs
Kingsmead Cricket Ground, Durban
Umpires: Bongani Jele and Siphelele Gasa

- Warriors won the toss and elected to field.

23 February 2021
Scorecard

Knights; 106 (20 overs)	v	Lions; 110/3 (18.1 overs)
Farhaan Behardien 28 (28); Sisanda Magala 5/20 (4 overs)		Temba Bavuma 53* (47); Gerald Coetzee 2/19 (4 overs)

Lions won by 7 wickets
Kingsmead Cricket Ground, Durban
Umpires: Brad White and Lubabalo Gcuma

- Knights won the toss and elected to bat.

24 February 2021
Scorecard

Warriors; 157/9 (20 overs)	v	Titans; 114/9 (20 overs)
Tristan Stubbs 44 (31); Lizaad Williams 2/23 (3 overs)		Aiden Markram 31 (28); Mthiwekhaya Nabe 4/21 (4 overs)

Warriors won by 43 runs
Kingsmead Cricket Ground, Durban
Umpires: Shaun George and Stephen Harris

- Warriors won the toss and elected to bat.

24 February 2021
Scorecard

Dolphins; 151/4 (20 overs)	v	Lions; 110 (19.3 overs)
David Miller 56* (38); Bjorn Fortuin 1/18 (2 overs)		Rassie van der Dussen 33 (29); Prenelan Subrayen 3/18 (4 overs)

Dolphins won by 41 runs
Kingsmead Cricket Ground, Durban
Umpires: Allahudien Paleker and Arno Jacobs

- Dolphins won the toss and elected to bat.

25 February 2021
Scorecard

Warriors; 157/8 (20 overs)	v	Knights; 143 (20 overs)
Lesiba Ngoepe 41 (30); Mbulelo Budaza 3/18 (4 overs)		Raynard van Tonder 81* (57); Mthiwekhaya Nabe 3/19 (4 overs)

Warriors won by 14 runs
Kingsmead Cricket Ground, Durban
Umpires: Allahudien Paleker and Siphelele Gasa

- Knights won the toss and elected to field.

26 February 2021
Scorecard

Cape Cobras; 144/6 (20 overs)	v	Lions; 147/3 (19.3 overs)
Christiaan Jonker 44 (39); Lutho Sipamla 2/27 (4 overs)		Christiaan Jonker 44 (39); Lutho Sipamla 2/27 (4 overs)

Lions won by 7 wickets
Kingsmead Cricket Ground, Durban
Umpires: Arno Jacobs and Lubabalo Gcuma

- Cape Cobras won the toss and elected to bat.

26 February 2021
Scorecard

Dolphins; 151/6 (20 overs)	v	Titans; 144/6 (20 overs)
David Miller 49* (35); Lungi Ngidi 3/21 (4 overs)		Dayyaan Galiem 45 (39); Robbie Frylinck 2/26 (4 overs)

Dolphins won by 7 runs
Kingsmead Cricket Ground, Durban
Umpires: Bongani Jele and Brad White

- Dolphins won the toss and elected to bat.

== Finals ==
Play-off
27 February 2021
Scorecard

Warriors; 141/6 (20 overs)	v	Lions; 142/3 (19.1 overs)
Wihan Lubbe 52 (38); Wiaan Mulder 1/11 (3 overs)		Temba Bavuma 48* (37); Mthiwekhaya Nabe 2/25 (3.1 overs)

Lions won by 7 wickets
Kingsmead Cricket Ground, Durban
Umpires: Shaun George and Stephen Harris

- Warriors won the toss and elected to bat.

Final
28 February 2021
Scorecard

Dolphins; 107/7 (20 overs)	v	Lions; 108/6 (19 overs)
Robbie Frylinck 30* (26); Kagiso Rabada 3/12 (4 overs)		Reeza Hendricks 39 (40); Ottniel Baartman 2/20 (4 overs)

Lions won by 4 wickets
Kingsmead Cricket Ground, Durban
Umpires: Allahudien Paleker and Bongani Jele

- Dolphins won the toss and elected to bat.
