= Twala =

Twala is a surname. Notable people with the surname include:

- Mary Twala (1939–2020), South African actress
- Musawenkosi Twala (born 2000), South African cricketer
- Sello Chicco Twala (born 1963), South African musician and producer
- Shado Twala (born 1958), South African radio DJ, journalist, entrepreneur, and radio and television producer
- William Twala (born 1990), South African footballer
