= Khanya Dilima =

South African cricketer (born 1999)

Personal information
- Born: 30 April 1999 (age 27)
- Source: Cricinfo, 28 February 2021

Khanya Dilima (born 30 April 1999) is a South African cricketer. He made his List A debut on 28 February 2021, for Boland in the 2020–21 CSA Provincial One-Day Challenge. He made his Twenty20 debut on 4 October 2021, for Boland in the 2021–22 CSA Provincial T20 Knock-Out tournament.
