= 2018 Africa T20 Cup =

International cricket tournament

Africa T20 Cup
- Dates: 14 – 24 September 2018
- Administrator: Cricket South Africa
- Cricket format: Twenty20
- Tournament format(s): Group stage, playoffs
- Host: South Africa
- Champions: Gauteng (1st title)
- Runners-up: Border
- Participants: 20
- Matches: 43
- Most runs: Marco Marais (359)
- Most wickets: Nandre Burger (11)

The 2018 Africa T20 Cup was the fourth and final edition of the Africa T20 Cup, a Twenty20 cricket tournament. It was held in South Africa in September 2018, as a curtain-raiser to the 2018–19 South African domestic season. Provincial side KwaZulu-Natal Inland were the defending champions.

Organised by Cricket South Africa, the tournament featured 20 teams. Sixteen of these teams had participated in previous years – thirteen South African provincial teams, national representative sides of Kenya, Namibia and Zimbabwe – and they were joined by South African teams Limpopo and Mpumalanga along with the national teams of Nigeria and Uganda. The invitation was initially extended to Ghana, but they declined and Uganda was invited in their place.

Uganda's captain, Roger Mukasa, said it would give the team "a priceless chance to get international exposure" ahead of the 2018 ICC World Cricket League Division Three tournament.

On the opening day of the tournament, Marco Marais scored an unbeaten century for Border against Namibia in Group C. In Group D, Shane Dadswell scored 98 runs from 34 balls for North West, which Cricket South Africa described as "the performance of the day". Marais scored his second century on the second day, making 106 not out. Wihan Lubbe also scored a century, batting for North West against Limpopo in Group D. In the same match, North West scored 262 runs, the second-highest score in T20 cricket.

Following the conclusion of the group stage of the tournament, Easterns, Gauteng, Border and North West had all progressed to the semi-finals of the competition. Gauteng and North West were drawn together in the first semi-final, with Border and Easterns playing each other in the second semi-final. The matches took place at Buffalo Park in East London.

In the first semi-final, Gauteng beat North West by 27 runs to progress to the final. They were joined by Border, after they beat Easterns by 7 wickets in the second semi-final. Gauteng won the tournament, beating Border by three wickets in the final.

For the next season, the tournament was replaced with the returning CSA Provincial T20 Cup, last played in the 2015–16 season, and featuring only the South African domestic provincial teams.

== Pool A ==
=== Squads ===
(South Africa) Easterns	Uganda	(South Africa) KwaZulu-Natal	(South Africa) KwaZulu-Natal Inland	(South Africa) Western Province
Matthew Arnold; Clayton August; Armandt Erasmus; Imran Manack; Wesley Marshall; Sizwe Masondo; Dyllan Matthews; Felane Neo; Zwelo Ntsimbini; Kabelo Sekhukhune; Jurie Snyman; Grant Thomson; Aron Visser	Roger Mukasa (c); Brian Masaba (vc); Fred Achelam (wk); Irfan Afridi; Zephania Arinaitwe; Bilal Hassan; Hamu Kayondo; Deusdedit Muhumuza; Dinesh Nakrani; Frank Nsubuga; Riazat Ali Shah; Charles Waiswa; Kenneth Waiswa	Marques Ackerman; Eathan Bosch; Blayde Capell; Khalipha Cele; Keith Dudgeon; Michael Erlank; Matt Montgomery; Senuran Muthusamy; Thula Ngcobo; Smangaliso Nhlebela; Zakariya Paruk; Andile Phehlukwayo; Calvin Savage	Cody Chetty; Gareth Dukes; Sarel Erwee; Mondli Khumalo; Sohail Mahmoud; Attie Maposa; Nduduzo Mfoza; Kerwin Mungroo; Kyle Nipper; Ruhan Pretorius; Grant Roelofsen; Lwandiswa Zuma; Sithabiso Zungu	Andre Malan (c); Qaasim Adams; Jonathan Bird; Michael Cohen; Isaac Dikgale; Dayyaan Galiem; Carlos Koyana; George Linde; Bonga Makaka; Janneman Malan; Mpilo Njoloza; Dane Paterson; Kyle Williamson

=== Points table ===
Team	Pld	W	L	T	NR	Pts	NRR
(South Africa) Easterns	4	3	1	0	0	14	+1.732
(South Africa) KwaZulu-Natal	4	3	1	0	0	12	+0.308
Uganda	4	2	2	0	0	9	–1.403
(South Africa) KwaZulu-Natal Inland	4	1	3	0	0	5	+0.212
(South Africa) Western Province	4	1	3	0	0	5	–0.979

=== Fixtures ===
14 September 2018
09:30
Scorecard

KwaZulu-Natal (South Africa); 163/5 (20 overs)	v	Uganda; 143/8 (20 overs)

KwaZulu-Natal won by 20 runs
City Oval, Pietermaritzburg

- Uganda won the toss and elected to field.
- Blayde Capell, Thula Ngcobo (KwaZulu-Natal), Fred Achelam, Zephania Arinaitwe, Bilal Hassan and Riazat Ali Shah (Uganda) all made their T20 debuts.

14 September 2018
09:30
Scorecard

Easterns (South Africa); 173/6 (20 overs)	v	(South Africa) Western Province; 115 (19 overs)

Easterns won by 58 runs
Varsity Oval, Pietermaritzburg

- Western Province won the toss and elected to field.
- Felane Neo (Easterns), Jonathan Bird and Bonga Makaka (Western Province) all made their T20 debuts.

14 September 2018
13:30
Scorecard

Easterns (South Africa); 183/8 (20 overs)	v	(South Africa) KwaZulu-Natal; 154/7 (20 overs)

Easterns won by 29 runs
City Oval, Pietermaritzburg

- Easterns won the toss and elected to bat.

14 September 2018
13:30
Scorecard

KwaZulu-Natal Inland (South Africa); 227/2 (20 overs)	v	Uganda; 94 (18.5 overs)

KwaZulu-Natal Inland won by 133 runs
Varsity Oval, Pietermaritzburg

- KwaZulu-Natal Inland won the toss and elected to bat.
- Mondli Khumalo and Sithabiso Zungu (KwaZulu-Natal Inland) both made their T20 debuts.

15 September 2018
09:30
Scorecard

Easterns (South Africa); 195/5 (20 overs)	v	(South Africa) KwaZulu-Natal Inland; 137/9 (20 overs)

Easterns won by 58 runs
City Oval, Pietermaritzburg

- KwaZulu-Natal Inland won the toss and elected to field.
- Luke Schlemmer (KwaZulu-Natal Inland) made his T20 debut.

15 September 2018
09:30
Scorecard

Western Province (South Africa); 152/7 (20 overs)	v	(South Africa) KwaZulu-Natal; 153/6 (18.4 overs)

KwaZulu-Natal won by 4 wickets
Varsity Oval, Pietermaritzburg

- Western Province won the toss and elected to bat.
- Matt Montgomery (KwaZulu-Natal), Thando Ntini and Kyle Williamson (Western Province) all made their T20 debuts.

15 September 2018
13:30
Scorecard

Easterns (South Africa); 143/6 (20 overs)	v	Uganda; 146/5 (19.3 overs)

Uganda won by 5 wickets
Varsity Oval, Pietermaritzburg

- Easterns won the toss and elected to bat.
- Zwelo Ntsimbini, Aron Visser (Easterns) and Kenneth Waiswa (Uganda) all made their T20 debuts.

15 September 2018
13:30
Scorecard

Western Province (South Africa); 220/3 (20 overs)	v	(South Africa) KwaZulu-Natal Inland; 185/6 (20 overs)

Western Province won by 35 runs
City Oval, Pietermaritzburg

- Western Province won the toss and elected to bat.

16 September 2018
09:30
Scorecard

Western Province (South Africa); 152/6 (20 overs)	v	Uganda; 154/4 (15.3 overs)

Uganda won by 6 wickets
City Oval, Pietermaritzburg

- Uganda won the toss and elected to field.

16 September 2018
13:00
Scorecard

KwaZulu-Natal Inland (South Africa); 130 (19.5 overs)	v	(South Africa) KwaZulu-Natal; 131/4 (17.2 overs)

KwaZulu-Natal won by 6 wickets
City Oval, Pietermaritzburg

- KwaZulu-Natal won the toss and elected to field.

== Pool B ==
=== Squads ===
(South Africa) Free State	(South Africa) Gauteng	(South Africa) Northerns	(South Africa) South Western Districts	Zimbabwe Select
Patrick Botha; Gerald Coetzee; Corné Dry; Andries Gous; Eddie Leie; Loyiso Mdashe; Thandolwethu Mnyaka; Karabo Mogotsi; Dilivio Ridgaard; Rudi Second; Romano Terblanche; Shadley van Schalkwyk; Sean Whitehead	Temba Bavuma; Nandre Burger; Chad Classen; Martin Coetzee; Carmi le Roux; Kgaudisa Molefe; Mangaliso Mosehle; Muhammed Mayet; Wiaan Mulder; Ndumiso Mvelase; Nono Pongolo; Delano Potgieter; Tumelo Tlhokwe	Neil Brand; Ruan de Swardt; Leus du Plooy; Rubin Hermann; Gionne Koopman; Victor Mahlangu; Gregory Mahlokwana; Sammy Mofokeng; Luvuyo Nkese; Jiveshan Pillay; Diego Rosier; Ruben Trumpelmann; Mitchell Van Buuren	Tladi Bokako; Bradley de Villiers; Jean du Plessis; Niel Hornbuckle; Brendon Louw; Aviwe Mgijima; Tshepiso Ndwandwa; Yamkela Oliphant; Marcello Piedt; Jacobus Pienaar; Jason Smith; Jaco van Rensburg; Zubayr Hamza	Tarisai Musakanda (c); Ryan Murray (vc); Faraz Akram; Brian Chari; Tinashe Kamunhukamwe; Neville Madziva; Rugare Magarira; Timycen Maruma; Brandon Mavuta; Tinotenda Mutombodzi; Richmond Mutumbami (wk); Richard Ngarava; Cephas Zhuwao

=== Points table ===
Team	Pld	W	L	T	NR	Pts	NRR
(South Africa) Gauteng	4	3	1	0	0	15	+2.129
(South Africa) Northerns	4	3	1	0	0	13	+0.569
Zimbabwe Select	4	3	1	0	0	13	–0.630
(South Africa) Free State	4	1	3	0	0	4	–0.761
(South Africa) South Western Districts	4	0	4	0	0	0	–1.387

=== Fixtures ===
14 September 2018
09:30
Scorecard

Northerns (South Africa); 150/4 (20 overs)	v	(South Africa) Free State; 136/7 (20 overs)

Northerns won by 14 runs
Bridgton Sports Grounds, Oudtshoorn

- Free State won the toss and elected to field.
- Dilivio Ridgaard (Free State), Neil Brand, Donavon Ferreira and Ruben Trumpelmann (Northerns) all made their T20 debuts.

14 September 2018
09:30
Scorecard

Zimbabwe Select; 48 (12.2 overs)	v	(South Africa) Gauteng; 53/3 (7.4 overs)

Gauteng won by 7 wickets
Recreation Ground, Oudtshoorn

- Gauteng won the toss and elected to field.
- Martin Coetzee, Juan Landsberg, Muhammed Mayet, Kgaudisa Molefe (Gauteng) and Faraz Akram (Zimbabwe Select) all made their T20 debuts.

14 September 2018
13:30
Scorecard

Gauteng (South Africa); 170/3 (20 overs)	v	(South Africa) South Western Districts; 130 (19.5 overs)

Gauteng won by 41 runs
Bridgton Sports Grounds, Oudtshoorn

- Gauteng won the toss and elected to bat.
- Tumelo Tlhokwe (Gauteng), Jaco van Rensburg, Tshepiso Ndwandwa and Bradley de Villiers (South Western Districts) all made their T20 debuts.

14 September 2018
13:30
Scorecard

Free State (South Africa); 145/5 (20 overs)	v	Zimbabwe Select; 149/3 (16 overs)

Zimbabwe Select won by 7 wickets
Recreation Ground, Oudtshoorn

- Zimbabwe Select won the toss and elected to field.

15 September 2018
09:30
Scorecard

Free State (South Africa); 174/8 (20 overs)	v	(South Africa) South Western Districts; 150 (18.1 overs)

Free State won by 24 runs
Recreation Ground, Oudtshoorn

- South Western Districts won the toss and elected to field.

15 September 2018
09:30
Scorecard

Northerns (South Africa); 137/6 (20 overs)	v	Zimbabwe Select; 140/4 (19.2 overs)

Zimbabwe Select won by 6 wickets
Bridgton Sports Grounds, Oudtshoorn

- Zimbabwe Select won the toss and elected to field.
- Mitchell Van Buuren, Kulani Baloyi (Northerns) and Patrick Mambo (Zimbabwe Select) all made their T20 debuts.

15 September 2018
13:30
Scorecard

Gauteng (South Africa); 156/7 (20 overs)	v	(South Africa) Free State; 121 (17.4 overs)

Gauteng won by 35 runs
Bridgton Sports Grounds, Oudtshoorn

- Gauteng won the toss and elected to bat.

15 September 2018
13:30
Scorecard

South Western Districts (South Africa); 120/9 (20 overs)	v	(South Africa) Northerns; 121/1 (15.1 overs)

Northerns won by 9 wickets
Recreation Ground, Oudtshoorn

- South Western Districts won the toss and elected to bat.
- Yamkela Oliphant (South Western Districts) made his T20 debut.

16 September 2018
09:30
Scorecard

Northerns (South Africa); 136 (19 overs)	v	(South Africa) Gauteng; 133/8 (20 overs)

Northerns won by 3 runs
Recreation Ground, Oudtshoorn

- Gauteng won the toss and elected to field.
- Chad Classen (Gauteng) made his T20 debut.

16 September 2018
13:00
Scorecard

South Western Districts (South Africa); 148/5 (20 overs)	v	Zimbabwe Select; 150/5 (19.3 overs)

Zimbabwe Select won by 5 wickets
Recreation Ground, Oudtshoorn

- South Western Districts won the toss and elected to bat.

== Pool C ==
=== Squads ===
(South Africa) Border	(South Africa) Eastern Province	Kenya	(South Africa) Mpumalanga	Namibia
Clayton Bosch; Gihahn Cloete; Phaphama Fojela; Ayabulela Gqamane; Christiaan Jonker; Bongolwethu Makeleni; Mncedisi Malika; Marco Marais; Jason Niemand; Jerry Nqolo; Yaseen Vallie; Basheeru-Deen Walters; Bamanye Xenxe	Matthew Breetzke; Mathew Christensen; Jade de Klerk; Thomas Kaber; Tian Koekemoer; Edward Moore; Lesiba Ngoepe; Solo Nqweni; Onke Nyaku; Lutho Sipamla; Kelly Smuts; Glenton Stuurman; Joshua van Heerden	Dhiren Gondaria; Gurdeep Singh; Irfan Karim; Pushpak Kerai; Shem Ngoche; Alex Obanda; Collins Obuya; Nelson Odhiambo; Nehemiah Odhiambo; Lucas Oluoch; Elijah Otieno; Rakep Patel; Emmanuel Bundi	Glen Adams; Aubrey Ferreira; Jared Fuchs; Mbasa Gqadushe; Tumi Koto; Musa Makhubela; Gerald Ngwenyama; Liam Peters; Blake Schraader; Maarten Steenkamp; Benjamin van Niekerk; Jacques Vosloo; Codi Yusuf	Stephan Baard; Christopher Coombe; Niko Davin; Gerhard Erasmus; Jan Frylinck; Zane Green; Nicol Loftie-Eaton; Lo-handre Louwrens; Tangeni Lungameni; Colin Peake; Michau du Preez; Bernard Scholtz; JJ Smit

=== Points table ===
Team	Pld	W	L	T	NR	Pts	NRR
(South Africa) Border	4	3	1	0	0	13	+1.573
(South Africa) Eastern Province	4	3	1	0	0	13	+1.176
Namibia	4	3	1	0	0	13	+0.726
Kenya	4	1	3	0	0	4	–1.997
(South Africa) Mpumalanga	4	0	4	0	0	0	–1.441

=== Fixtures ===
14 September 2018
09:30
Scorecard

Eastern Province (South Africa); 150/9 (20 overs)	v	Namibia; 135/8 (20 overs)

Eastern Province won by 15 runs
Buffalo Park, East London

- Namibia won the toss and elected to field.
- Joshua van Heerden, Lutho Sipamla (Eastern Province) and Nicol Loftie-Eaton (Namibia) all made their T20 debuts.

14 September 2018
09:30
Scorecard

Mpumalanga (South Africa); 166/9 (20 overs)	v	Kenya; 170/2 (19.2 overs)

Kenya won by 8 wickets
Police Park, East London

- Kenya won the toss and elected to field.
- Glen Adams, Jared Fuchs, Tumi Koto, Musa Makhubela, Gerald Ngwenyama, Blake Schraader, Maarten Steenkamp, Benjamin van Niekerk and Codi Yusuf (Mpumalanga) all made their T20 debuts.

14 September 2018
13:30
Scorecard

Border (South Africa); 193/4 (20 overs)	v	Namibia; 197/5 (19.4 overs)

Namibia won by 5 wickets
Police Park, East London

- Namibia won the toss and elected to field.
- Jason Niemand and Bongolwethu Makeleni (Border) both made their T20 debuts.

14 September 2018
13:30
Scorecard

Eastern Province (South Africa); 170/3 (20 overs)	v	(South Africa) Mpumalanga; 159/5 (20 overs)

Eastern Province won by 11 runs
Buffalo Park, East London

- Eastern Province won the toss and elected to bat.
- Tian Koekemoer, Athi Mafazwe (Eastern Province) and Jacques Vosloo (Mpumalanga) all made their T20 debuts.

15 September 2018
09:30
Scorecard

Mpumalanga (South Africa); 175/5 (20 overs)	v	(South Africa) Border; 179/1 (17.3 overs)

Border won by 9 wickets
Buffalo Park, East London

- Border won the toss and elected to field.
- Bamanye Xenxe (Border) and Liam Peters (Mpumalanga) both made their T20 debuts.

15 September 2018
09:30
Scorecard

Eastern Province (South Africa); 189/6 (20 overs)	v	Kenya; 109 (15.3 overs)

Eastern Province won by 79 runs
Police Park, East London

- Kenya won the toss and elected to field.

15 September 2018
13:30
Scorecard

Kenya; 130/6 (20 overs)	v	(South Africa) Border; 133/2 (10.5 overs)

Border won by 8 wickets
Buffalo Park, East London

- Kenya won the toss and elected to bat.

15 September 2018
13:30
Scorecard

Namibia; 216/4 (20 overs)	v	(South Africa) Mpumalanga; 150 (19 overs)

Namibia won by 66 runs
Police Park, East London

- Mpumalanga won the toss and elected to field.

16 September 2018
09:30
Scorecard

Kenya; 183/8 (20 overs)	v	Namibia; 183/7 (20 overs)

Match tied
(Namibia won the one-over eliminator)
Buffalo Park, East London

- Namibia won the toss and elected to field.

16 September 2018
13:00
Scorecard

Eastern Province (South Africa); 137/7 (20 overs)	v	(South Africa) Border; 141/7 (19 overs)

Border won by 3 wickets
Buffalo Park, East London

- Border won the toss and elected to field.

== Pool D ==
=== Squads ===
(South Africa) Boland	(South Africa) Limpopo	Nigeria	(South Africa) Northern Cape	(South Africa) North West
Ziyaad Abrahams; Ferisco Adams; David Bedingham; Charl Cyster; Reeve Cyster; Fritz de Beer; Sinalo Gobeni; Hanno Kotze; Pieter Malan; Nkululeko Serame; Kyle Simmonds; Cebo Tshiki; Lizaad Williams	Thomas Hobson; Ernest Kemm; Lerato Kgoatle; Kgosi Leopeng; Don Radebe; Ruan Sadler; Isaac Senetla; Ben Skade; Julian Soutter; Leighton Swarts; Lefa Thaba; Michael Weldon; Ruan Willemse	Abiodun Abioye; Sesan Adedeji; Mojeed Adiamo; Joshua Ayannaike; Isaac Danladi; Daniel Gim; Chibuike Iteogu; Isaac Okpe; Sylvester Okpe; Ademola Onikoyi; Chimezie Onwuzulike; Mohameed Taiwo; Ovais Yousof	Ottniel Baartman; Patrick Kruger; Themba Maupa; Avumile Mnci; Kagiso Mohale; Grant Mokoena; Nangomso Mqaleni; Mtabozuko Nqam; Keegan Petersen; Farhaan Sayanvala; Jacques Snyman; Aubrey Swanepoel; Mason Zacharia	Brady Barends; Yassar Cook; Kevin Crowie; Shane Dadswell; Johannes Diseko; Ruan Haasbroek; Katleho Leokaoke; Wihan Lubbe; Migael Pretorius; Kagiso Rapulana; Lesego Senokwane; Nicky van den Bergh; Jovuan van Wyngaardt

=== Points table ===
Team	Pld	W	L	T	NR	Pts	NRR
(South Africa) North West	4	3	1	0	0	14	+2.311
(South Africa) Boland	4	3	1	0	0	14	+2.101
(South Africa) Northern Cape	4	3	1	0	0	14	–0.792
(South Africa) Limpopo	4	1	3	0	0	5	–1.869
Nigeria	4	0	4	0	0	0	–4.205

=== Fixtures ===
14 September 2018
09:30
Scorecard

Nigeria; 131/8 (20 overs)	v	(South Africa) North West; 116/0 (9.3 overs)

North West won by 10 wickets (D/L)
Boland Park, Paarl

- North West won the toss and elected to field.
- Shane Dadswell, Jovuan van Wyngaardt (North West), Abiodun Abioye, Mojeed Adiamo, Joshua Ayannaike, Isaac Danladi, Daniel Gim, Isaac Okpe, Sylvester Okpe, Ademola Onikoyi, Chimezie Onwuzulike, Mohameed Taiwo and Ovais Yousof (Nigeria) all made their T20 debuts.

14 September 2018
09:30
Scorecard

Limpopo (South Africa); 125/5 (20 overs)	v	(South Africa) Northern Cape; 111/4 (13.2 overs)

Northern Cape won by 6 wickets (D/L)
Boland Park, Paarl

- Northern Cape won the toss and elected to field.
- Thomas Hobson, Don Radebe, Theo van Rensburg, Ruan Sadler, Xolane Shongwe, Leighton Swarts, Lefa Thaba, Michael Weldon (Limpopo) and Mtabozuko Nqam (Northern Cape) all made their T20 debuts.

14 September 2018
13:30
Scorecard

North West (South Africa); 162/8 (20 overs)	v	(South Africa) Northern Cape; 165/5 (20 overs)

Northern Cape won by 5 wickets
Boland Park, Paarl

- Northern Cape won the toss and elected to field.
- Grant Mokoena (Northern Cape) and Kevin Crowie (North West) both made their T20 debuts.

14 September 2018
13:30
Scorecard

Limpopo (South Africa); 98/9 (20 overs)	v	(South Africa) Boland; 104/3 (15.2 overs)

Boland won by 7 wickets
Boland Park, Paarl

- Boland won the toss and elected to field.
- Sinalo Gobeni, Charl Cyster (Boland), Michael van Rensburg, Kgosi Leopeng and Ben Skade (Limpopo) all made their T20 debuts.

15 September 2018
09:30
Scorecard

North West (South Africa); 130/6 (20 overs)	v	(South Africa) Boland; 119/7 (20 overs)

North West won by 11 runs
Boland Park, Paarl

- North West won the toss and elected to bat.

15 September 2018
09:30
Scorecard

Nigeria; 136/6 (20 overs)	v	(South Africa) Northern Cape; 137/2 (15 overs)

Northern Cape won by 8 wickets
Boland Park, Paarl

- Northern Cape won the toss and elected to field.
- Nangomso Mqaleni (Northern Cape), Sesan Adedeji and Chibuike Iteogu (Nigeria) all made their T20 debuts.

15 September 2018
13:30
Scorecard

North West (South Africa); 262/4 (20 overs)	v	(South Africa) Limpopo; 160 (18.5 overs)

North West won by 62 runs
Boland Park, Paarl

- Limpopo won the toss and elected to field.

15 September 2018
13:30
Scorecard

Nigeria; 64/8 (20 overs)	v	(South Africa) Boland; 67/2 (5.2 overs)

Boland won by 8 wickets
Boland Park, Paarl

- Nigeria won the toss and elected to bat.
- Fritz de Beer (Boland) made his T20 debut.

16 September 2018
09:30
Scorecard

Nigeria; 112/7 (20 overs)	v	(South Africa) Limpopo; 116/4 (15 overs)

Limpopo won by 6 wickets
Boland Park, Paarl

- Nigeria won the toss and elected to bat.

16 September 2018
13:00
Scorecard

Northern Cape (South Africa); 141/8 (20 overs)	v	(South Africa) Boland; 142/6 (16.5 overs)

Boland won by 4 wickets
Boland Park, Paarl

- Boland won the toss and elected to field.

== Finals ==
=== Semi-finals ===
23 September 2018
09:30
Scorecard

Gauteng (South Africa); 171/5 (20 overs)	v	(South Africa) North West; 144/9 (17.5 overs)

Gauteng won by 27 runs
Buffalo Park, East London

- North West won the toss and elected to field.

23 September 2018
13:00
Scorecard

Easterns (South Africa); 134/9 (20 overs)	v	(South Africa) Border; 135/3 (13.4 overs)

Border won by 7 wickets
Buffalo Park, East London

- Easterns won the toss and elected to bat.

=== Final ===
24 September 2018
10:00
Scorecard

Border (South Africa); 130 (20 overs)	v	(South Africa) Gauteng; 131/7 (19.2 overs)

Gauteng won by 3 wickets
Buffalo Park, East London

- Gauteng won the toss and elected to field.
