= Charl Cyster =

South African cricketer (born 1994)

Personal information
- Full name: Charl Cyster
- Born: 2 April 1994 (age 32)
- Source: ESPNcricinfo, 30 October 2016

Charl Cyster (born 2 April 1994) is a South African cricketer. He made his first-class debut for Boland in the 2016–17 Sunfoil 3-Day Cup on 27 October 2016. He made his List A debut for Boland in the 2016–17 CSA Provincial One-Day Challenge on 30 October 2016. In September 2018, he was named in Boland's squad for the 2018 Africa T20 Cup. He made his Twenty20 debut for Boland in the 2018 Africa T20 Cup on 14 September 2018. In September 2019, he was named in Boland's squad for the 2019–20 CSA Provincial T20 Cup.
