= Jean-Pierre Bloem =

South African cricketer (born 2000)

Personal information
- Born: 29 June 2000 (age 26)
- Source: Cricinfo, 25 February 2021

Jean-Pierre Bloem (born 29 June 2000) is a South African cricketer. He made his first-class debut on 22 February 2021, for Easterns in the 2020–21 CSA 3-Day Provincial Cup. He made his List A debut on 28 February 2021, for Easterns in the 2020–21 CSA Provincial One-Day Challenge.
