= Tumi Koto =

South African cricketer (born 1994)

Personal information
- Full name: Tumi Koto
- Born: 19 November 1994 (age 31)
- Source: ESPNcricinfo, 9 February 2017

Tumi Koto (born 19 November 1994) is a South African cricketer. He made his first-class debut for Northerns in the 2016–17 Sunfoil 3-Day Cup on 9 February 2017. He made his List A debut for Northerns in the 2017–18 CSA Provincial One-Day Challenge on 7 January 2018.

In September 2018, he was named in Mpumalanga's squad for the 2018 Africa T20 Cup. He made his Twenty20 debut for Mpumalanga in the 2018 Africa T20 Cup on 14 September 2018. In April 2021, he was named in Mpumalanga's squad, ahead of the 2021–22 cricket season in South Africa.
