= David Teeger =

South African cricketer

Personal information
- Born: 11 January 2005 (age 21); Johannesburg, South Africa
- Batting: Right-handed
- Bowling: Right-arm offbreak

Domestic team information
- Years: Team
- 2023-present: South Africa Emerging Players

Career statistics
Competition	List A
Matches	3
Runs scored	159
Batting average	79.50
100s/50s	0/2
Top score	95*
Balls bowled	30
Wickets	1
Bowling average	20.00
5 wickets in innings	0
10 wickets in match	0
Best bowling	1/11
Catches/stumpings	1/–
- Source: Cricinfo, 12 March 2025

David Teeger (born 11 January 2005) is a South African cricketer who plays age-group cricket representing South Africa national under-19 cricket team. He made his debut in competitive top flight cricket during the 2023 CSA One-Day Cup.

== Career ==
The South Africa Emerging team played in division 2 of the 2023 CSA One-Day Cup; it was the first time the team had participated in the tournament, and the squad was constitute of players aged 18 to 23. The squad included members of the South Africa under-19 team to give them greater experience. Teeger made his List A debut on 28 September 2023, playing for South Africa Emerging Players side against North Cape in the 2023 CSA One-Day Cup. He scored a half-century batting at number three position, scoring a 69-ball 51 including a six and a four. South Africa Emerging won the division 2 final against Free State Knights. Teeger scored 95 not out.

He was captain of the South Africa national under-19 cricket team during 2023.

He was relieved of the captaincy on 12 January 2024 by a controversial decision of Cricket South Africa (CSA). He remained a member of the squad.

=== Controversy ===
In October 2023, Teeger won the Rising Star award at the Jewish Achiever Awards. At the awards ceremony he said that "the true rising stars are the young soldiers in Israel", and dedicated the award to "the South African family that married off one son while the other is still missing. And...to the state of Israel and every single soldier fighting so that we can live and thrive in the diaspora." The South African family he referred to is that of Rabbi Doron Perez whose one son was injured during the 2023 Hamas-led attack on Israel but subsequently recovered and got married. The rabbi's other son has been missing since the attack.

South African advocacy group Palestine Solidarity Alliance lodged a complaint against him for these utterances, saying that they were a "provocative and inflammatory political statement". In response, Cricket South Africa appointed respected advocate Wim Trengove SC to perform an independent enquiry to establish whether Teeger had breached the code of conduct of either CSA or Central Gauteng Lions, the local provincial club for which he plays. The investigation had three terms of reference, to determine whether or not Teeger:

1. Should be charged with "unbecoming or detrimental conduct";
2. Made statements at the award ceremony that "were detrimental to the game of cricket"; or
3. Made statements that were "detrimental to relations between the competing teams".

Teeger's submission to Trengove stated that he did not believe Israel was committing genocide, a view he said was held by many people and governments worldwide. He added that his words could, therefore, not be seen as supporting genocide, because he did not see Israel's actions as involving genocide.

In his findings Trengove quoted the Supreme Court of South Africa as having confirmed that hate speech was not protected under the right to freedom of speech in the constitution, but also emphasising that the expression of unpopular or offensive speech was not hate speech. He found that Teeger's statements, while possibly offensive to some, were held by other South Africans, and that his audience clearly understood that he was expressing personal beliefs and not representing CSA's opinions. On this basis he cleared Teeger of breaching the constitution or any of the codes of conduct.

CSA publicly accepted the investigation's findings on 7 December 2023 saying that they had been "received, considered, and accepted". The Palestinian Solidarity Alliance continued to express its opinion that Teeger had created a "significant rift within the cricket community", and was not fit to lead the team. They said that they would protest at the 2024 Under-19 Cricket World Cup, to be held in South Africa from 19 January 2024 to 11 February 2024, if he was not suspended from the squad.

In Trengove's report, he mentioned that Mr Azhar Saloojee, "a director" of Diadora South Africa, had said Diadora would not sponsor any matches in which Teeger participated. Diadora is an Italian sportswear company. After news reports of Diadora's boycott where published, Juan Carlos Venti, at Diadora Italy, distanced the company from Mr Saloojee, who he said was not connected to the company, and with whose comments the company did not agree.

In December 2023, Teeger was re-appointed to captain the South Africa national under-19 cricket team by Cricket South Africa. He led the team in this capacity in a three-team tournament with India and Afghanistan in late December and early January, scoring 47 runs in four matches. During the tournament, a group of pro-Palestine protesters peacefully protested Teeger's appointment. They picketed outside the main gate of the Newlands Cricket Ground where the match was held. They were subsequently moved to a specific area designated for protesters where they continued protesting with no incident. A small group of protesters sat in one of the stands inside the grounds displaying Palestinian flags in a non-disruptive way. CSA said they expected the number of protesters to increase during the World Cup if Teeger remained captain.

Teeger was expected to lead the team in the 2024 Under-19 Cricket World Cup. In January 2024, a week before the start of the World Cup, Cricket South Africa removed Teeger from the captaincy while retaining him in the World Cup squad. Before his dismissal As captain, Teeger was asked to voluntarily step down from the position, or to withdraw and apologise for his remarks. He declined to do so.

In a statement, CSA explained that "We have been advised that protests related to the war in Gaza can be anticipated at the venues for the tournament. We have also been advised that they are likely to focus on the position of the SA Under-19 captain, David Teeger, and that there is a risk that they could result in conflict or even violence, including between rival groups of protestors. CSA has a primary duty to safeguard the interests and safety of all those involved in the World Cup and must accordingly respect the expert advice of those responsible for the safety of participants and spectators. In all the circumstances, CSA has decided that David should be relieved of the captaincy for the tournament. This is in the best interests of all the players, the SA U19 team and David himself."

CSA appointed Jaun James to captain the under-19 team during the World Cup.

==== Reaction ====
In an immediate reaction to the removal of Teeger's captaincy, Karen Miller, national chairperson the South African Jewish Board of Deputies (SAJBD), called the action "shameful" and asserted that "[t]here [was] no basis for this decision, other than the fact that Teeger is Jewish". The board pledged to do everything in their power to have the decision reversed.

A meeting between the SAJBD and Cricket South Africa was held to discuss the matter. After the meeting national vice-president of The SAJBD, Zev Krengel, described the security concerns as "totally bogus and an excuse to strip him of his captaincy". He reported that when asked for the security information on which their decision was made the CSA did not provide any. He alleges that they changed the description of the information from being a report by the State Security Agency to a "briefing" but did not produce information relating to this either. Mr Krengel characterised this as leaving only two options, "antisemitism at CSA or massive political interference from the ANC." He appealed to the International Cricket Council (ICC) to intervene. The ICC has said it will not get involved, stating that it was not constituted to interfere in team selection which was for its member bodies to decide.

Mr Lawson Naaidoo, chairperson of CSA, responded to the SAJBD accusations by indicating that CSA had previously been called Zionist sympathizers and were now being called antisemitic, which showed that CSA where acting in the best interests of cricket rather than trying to please any political positions.

The Democratic Alliance (DA), is the official opposition in the National Parliament of South Africa, and controls the Western Cape Provincial Parliament, one of the nine first level administrative subdivisions of the country. The DA has submitted a Promotion of Access to Information Act application to obtain the risk assessment report used as a basis for the CSA decision. The DA are disputing that security concerns were the reason behind the decision, stating that all sources that they had consulted had stated that while there would be protests, they would be peaceful, and not raise substantial risk to spectators or players. They stated that they were intervening to protect constitutional rights and that CSA should not have succumbed to intimidation in their decision making. They threatened to take the issue to the South African Human Rights Commission if Teeger was not reinstated.

The Western Cape branch of the African National Congress which is the provincial official opposition to the DA in the Western Cape Provincial Legislature released a press statement. In it they congratulated the new under-19 captain on his appointment and condemned the DA for defending the "Israeli genocide supporter, David Teeger" and for being on the wrong side relating to the genocide of the Palestinian people. It further condemned the DA for threatening to take the issue to the Human Rights Commission.

The National ANC controls the National Parliament and the Provincial Legislatures of the other eight provinces. South Africa under the leadership of the ANC has instituted proceedings against the State of Israel before the International Court of Justice (ICJ), alleging that Israel has committed, and is committing, genocide against Palestinians in the Gaza Strip, in violation of the Genocide Convention.
