= Jaco van Rensburg =

South African cricketer (born 1997)

Personal information
- Born: 25 November 1997 (age 28)
- Source: Cricinfo, 14 September 2018

Jaco van Rensburg (born 25 November 1997) is a South African cricketer. He made his Twenty20 debut for South Western Districts in the 2018 Africa T20 Cup on 14 September 2018.
