= Jacques Vosloo =

South African cricketer (born 2001)

Personal information
- Born: 26 September 2001 (age 25)
- Source: Cricinfo, 14 September 2018

Jacques Vosloo (born 26 September 2001) is a South African cricketer. He made his Twenty20 debut for Mpumalanga in the 2018 Africa T20 Cup on 14 September 2018.
