= Aubrey Ferreira =

South African cricketer (born 1994)

Personal information
- Born: 15 October 1994 (age 32)
- Bowling: ح٩٠
- Source: Cricinfo, 12 October 2017

Aubrey Ferreira (born 15 October 1994) is a South African cricketer. He made his first-class debut for Eastern Province in the 2017–18 Sunfoil 3-Day Cup on 12 October 2017.

In September 2018, he was named in Mpumalanga's squad for the 2018 Africa T20 Cup. He was the leading run-scorer for Mpumalanga in the tournament, with 120 runs in four matches.
