= Avumile Mnci =

South African cricketer (born 1991)

Personal information
- Born: 18 December 1991 (age 33); Cape Province
- Batting: Right-handed
- Role: Wicketkeeper
- Source: ESPNcricinfo, 12 September 2016

Avumile Mnci (born 18 December 1991) is a South African cricketer. He is a right-handed batsman and a wicketkeeper.

He made his first class debut for Border against Northerns on 5 January 2016.

He made his List A debut for Borders against Northerns on 8 January 2016.

In September 2018, he was named in Northern Cape's squad for the 2018 Africa T20 Cup.
