= Sithabiso Zungu =

South African cricketer (born 1997)

Personal information
- Born: 31 August 1997 (age 29); Durban, South Africa
- Source: ESPNcricinfo, 28 October 2016

Sithabiso Zungu (born 31 August 1997) is a South African professional cricketer. He made his first-class debut for KwaZulu-Natal in the 2016–17 Sunfoil 3-Day Cup on 28 October 2016. He made his List A debut for KwaZulu-Natal in the 2016–17 CSA Provincial One-Day Challenge on 31 October 2016.

In September 2018, he was named in KwaZulu-Natal Inland's squad for the 2018 Africa T20 Cup. He made his Twenty20 debut for KwaZulu-Natal Inland in the 2018 Africa T20 Cup on 14 September 2018.
