= Yaseen Vallie =

South African cricketer

Personal information
- Full name: Mohammed Yaseen Vallie
- Born: 30 July 1989 (age 37); Cape Town, Western Cape, South Africa
- Nickname: Mo, Koppe
- Height: 5 ft 8 in (1.73 m)
- Batting: Right-handed
- Bowling: Right-arm off-spin
- Role: Middle-order batsman

Domestic team information
- Years: Team
- 2008/09-present: Western Province
- 2011/12-present: Cape Cobras

Mohammad Yaseen Vallie (born 30 July 1989), also known as Yaseen Vallie, is a South African cricketer who plays for the Warriors.

== Career ==
Vallie was selected to play for South Africa in the 2008 U-19 Cricket World Cup as an all-rounder. He took 5 wickets in the six matches he played in, as well as scoring 54 runs at a meager average of 13.50.

Vallie signed up with the Western Province soon after the 2008 U-19 Cricket World Cup and made an impression as a reliable right-handed batsman as well as a partnership-breaking off-spin bowler. However, Vallie had not received a contract from the Cape Cobras yet, and was thinking about moving to another place where he would be able to enhance his cricket abilities by getting more opportunities to play so he could further his career as a professional cricketer. Vallie was called up to represent the Cape Cobras in a match against the Titans in a Sunfoil Cup match in 2011 and scored 167 before being bowled by Albie Morkel. Vallie received a contract from the Cobras at the start of the 2012–13 season.

In August 2017, he was named in Bloem City Blazers' squad for the first season of the T20 Global League. However, in October 2017, Cricket South Africa initially postponed the tournament until November 2018, with it being cancelled soon after.

In August 2018, he was named in Border's squad for the 2018 Africa T20 Cup. In April 2021, he was named in Western Province's squad, ahead of the 2021–22 cricket season in South Africa. On 1 April 2022, in Division One of the 2021–22 CSA One-Day Cup, Vallie scored his first century in List A cricket, with 102 runs for Western Province against Boland.
