= Tshepiso Ndwandwa =

South African cricketer (born 1996)

Personal information
- Born: 6 April 1996 (age 30)
- Source: Cricinfo, 14 September 2018

Tshepiso Ndwandwa (born 6 April 1996) is a South African cricketer. He made his Twenty20 debut for South Western Districts in the 2018 Africa T20 Cup on 14 September 2018. He made his List A debut on 6 October 2019, for South Western Districts in the 2019–20 CSA Provincial One-Day Challenge.
