= Theesan Naicker =

South African cricketer (born 1999)

Personal information
- Born: 19 February 1999 (age 27)
- Source: Cricinfo, 28 February 2021

Theesan Naicker (born 19 February 1999) is a South African cricketer. He made his List A debut on 28 February 2021, for KwaZulu-Natal in the 2020–21 CSA Provincial One-Day Challenge.
