= Aron Visser =

South African cricketer (born 1999)

Personal information
- Born: 24 March 1999 (age 27)
- Source: Cricinfo, 15 September 2018

Aron Visser (born 24 March 1999) is a South African cricketer. He made his Twenty20 debut for Easterns in the 2018 Africa T20 Cup on 15 September 2018. He made his List A debut for Easterns in the 2018–19 CSA Provincial One-Day Challenge on 7 October 2018. In September 2019, he was named in Easterns' squad for the 2019–20 CSA Provincial T20 Cup. He made his first-class debut on 14 November 2019, for Easterns in the 2019–20 CSA 3-Day Provincial Cup.
