= Mondli Khumalo =

South African cricketer (born 2001)

Personal information
- Born: 16 July 2001 (age 25)
- Source: Cricinfo, 14 September 2018

Mondli Khumalo (born 16 July 2001) is a South African cricketer. He made his Twenty20 debut for KwaZulu-Natal Inland in the 2018 Africa T20 Cup on 14 September 2018. In December 2019, he was named in South Africa's squad for the 2020 Under-19 Cricket World Cup. He made his List A debut on 7 March 2020, for KwaZulu-Natal Inland in the 2019–20 CSA Provincial One-Day Challenge. He made his first-class debut on 4 March 2021, for KwaZulu-Natal Inland in the 2020–21 CSA 3-Day Provincial Cup.

In May 2022, Khumalo was assaulted on a night out in Bridgwater, England, resulting in him being placed into an induced coma.
