= Wonder Mtolo =

South African cricketer (born 2000)

Personal information
- Born: 18 October 2000 (age 26)
- Source: Cricinfo, 1 March 2021

Wonder Mtolo (born 18 October 2000) is a South African cricketer. He made his List A debut on 1 March 2021, for KwaZulu-Natal in the 2020–21 CSA Provincial One-Day Challenge.
