= Gerald Ngwenyama =

South African cricketer (born 1995)

Personal information
- Born: 15 June 1995 (age 31)
- Source: Cricinfo, 14 September 2018

Gerald Ngwenyama (born 15 June 1995) is a South African cricketer. He made his Twenty20 debut for Mpumalanga in the 2018 Africa T20 Cup on 14 September 2018.
