= Slade van Staden =

South African cricketer (born 2003)

Personal information
- Born: 30 April 2003 (age 23)
- Source: Cricinfo, 14 February 2020

Slade van Staden (born 30 April 2003) is a South African-American cricketer. He made his first-class debut on 13 February 2020, for KwaZulu-Natal Inland in the 2019–20 CSA 3-Day Provincial Cup. In July 2021, he was selected to represent the United States at the U19 World Cup qualifiers. He made his List A debut on 21 March 2022, for Dolphins in the 2021–22 CSA One-Day Cup.
