= Mojeed Adiamo =

Nigerian cricketer (born 1996)

Personal information
- Full name: Mojeed Adiamo Abayomi
- Born: 17 October 1996 (age 29); Ogunstate, Nigeria
- Batting: Right-handed
- Bowling: Right-arm medium
- Role: Batsman

International information
- National side: Nigeria
- Source: Cricinfo, 14 September 2018

Mojeed Adiamo (born 17 October 1996) is a Nigerian cricketer. In September 2018, he was named in Nigeria's squad for the 2018 Africa T20 Cup. He made his Twenty20 debut for Nigeria in the 2018 Africa T20 Cup on 14 September 2018.
