= Roelof Hugo =

South African cricketer

Personal information
- Full name: Roelof Petrus Hugo
- Born: 1 July 1983 (age 43); Johannesburg, Transvaal, South Africa
- Batting: Right-handed
- Role: Wicketkeeper-batsman

Domestic team information
- Years: Team
- 2006/07: Mpumalanga
- 2007/08–2010/11: South Western Districts

Career statistics
Competition	FC	LA
Matches	38	41
Runs scored	1312	777
Batting average	21.16	25.90
100s/50s	0/4	1/4
Top score	91	106*
Catches/stumpings	98/14	31/13
- Source: Cricinfo, 27 November 2022

Roelof Petrus Hugo (born 1 July 1983) is a South African retired cricketer who played first-class and List A cricket for Mpumalanga and South Western Districts between 2006 and 2011.

Hugo was the captain and wicket-keeper for Mpumalanga in 2006–07 when they played their inaugural season of first-class cricket. He then spent four seasons as the wicket-keeper for South Western Districts. His highest first-class score was 91, which he made out of a team total of 165 all out for Mpumalanga against Namibia in November 2006. The next day he made a List A century against Namibia: 106 not out off 90 balls.

During the English cricket season, Hugo played as a professional for Heyside in the Saddleworth and District Cricket League in Lancashire from 2007 to 2011. He now works as the marketing and sales director for Nextrend, a health and safety company in Mpumalanga.
