= Kyle Nipper =

South African cricketer (born 1987)

Personal information
- Born: 25 November 1987 (age 38); Pietermaritzburg, South Africa
- Source: Cricinfo, 1 September 2015

Kyle Nipper (born 25 November 1987) is a South African first-class cricketer. He was in the KZN Inland squad for the 2015 Africa T20 Cup. In August 2017, he was named in Pretoria Mavericks' squad for the first season of the T20 Global League. However, in October 2017, Cricket South Africa initially postponed the tournament until November 2018, which was cancelled soon after.

In September 2018, he was named in KwaZulu-Natal Inland's squad for the 2018 Africa T20 Cup. He was the leading run-scorer for KwaZulu-Natal Inland in the tournament, with 189 runs in four matches.
