= Glen Adams (cricketer) =

South African cricketer (born 1995)

Personal information
- Born: 16 February 1995 (age 31)
- Source: Cricinfo, 14 September 2018

Glen Adams (born 16 February 1995) is a South African cricketer. He made his Twenty20 debut for Mpumalanga in the 2018 Africa T20 Cup on 14 September 2018. He made his List A debut on 23 March 2021, for North West in the 2020–21 CSA Provincial One-Day Challenge. In April 2021, he was named in Mpumalanga's squad, ahead of the 2021–22 cricket season in South Africa.
