= Bamanye Xenxe =

South African cricketer (born 1997)

Personal information
- Born: 25 May 1997 (age 29); Middledrift
- Nickname: Quicky
- Source: Cricinfo, 15 October 2017

Bamanye Xenxe (born 25 May 1997) is a South African cricketer. He made his List A debut for Border in the 2017–18 CSA Provincial One-Day Challenge on 15 October 2017. He made his first-class debut for Border in the 2017–18 Sunfoil 3-Day Cup on 15 February 2018. In August 2018, he was named in Border's squad for the 2018 Africa T20 Cup. He made his Twenty20 debut for Border in the 2019–20 CSA Provincial T20 Cup on 13 September 2019. In April 2021, he was named in Mpumalanga's squad, ahead of the 2021–22 cricket season in South Africa.
