= Levert Manje =

South African cricketer (born 2001)

Personal information
- Born: 28 June 2001 (age 25)
- Source: Cricinfo, 14 February 2020

Levert Manje (born 28 June 2001) is a South African cricketer. He made his first-class debut on 13 February 2020, for Gauteng in the 2019–20 CSA 3-Day Provincial Cup. Prior to his first-class debut, he was named in South Africa's squad for the 2020 Under-19 Cricket World Cup. He made his List A debut on 22 March 2021, for Gauteng in the 2020–21 CSA Provincial One-Day Challenge.

In April 2021, he was named in Gauteng's squad, ahead of the 2021–22 cricket season in South Africa.
