= Kei cricket team =

Former South African cricket team from Mthatha

Kei were a South African first-class cricket team based in the Eastern Cape city of Mthatha.

== Playing history ==
When Cricket South Africa decided to expand the Provincial Three-Day Challenge in 2006, Kei were one of five provincial teams (along with KwaZulu-Natal Inland, Limpopo, Mpumalanga and South Western Districts) elevated to first-class status.

Kei played seven first-class matches in the 2006–07 season, losing them all by large margins, five of them by an innings. They also lost all six of their matches in the Provincial One-Day Challenge by large margins. None of their matches were played on their home ground in Mthatha.

Their most successful batsman in the first-class matches was Sivuyile Duda, who scored 265 runs at an average of 18.92 including the team's only century, 102 against KwaZulu-Natal Inland. Keeping wicket, Duda also made four catches and a stumping in that match, and finished the season with 12 catches and two stumpings. He played one match for KwaZulu-Natal Inland in 2007–08.

In a competition that was itself of borderline first-class status, Cricket South Africa considered Kei's performance, along with those of Limpopo and Mpumalanga, too weak to justify their place, and after one season, all three teams were omitted. Kei have played no further first-class cricket. Limpopo and Mpumalanga returned as first-class teams for the 2022–23 season following a further restructuring of top-level cricket in South Africa.

Since 2010–11 Kei have competed in the Cricket South Africa Rural League, coastal division, a 50-over competition.

== List of players ==
Kei played seven matches at first-class level, all during the 2006–07 season of the South African Airways Provincial Challenge. The team used 18 players during this period, three of whom (Sivuyile Duda, Mdngezi Nabe, and Junior Yoli) played in each match. Key:

- ‡ – served as captain
- † – served as wicket-keeper
- No. – order of appearance

No.	Name	Matches	Runs	Wickets	Ref
1	Khabele Moerane ‡	6	209	4	
2	Junior Yoli	7	165	8	
3	Sivuyile Duda †	7	265	0	
4	Andile Hlahleni	6	124	6	
5	Madoda Ntsekwa	3	67	2	
6	Thulani Kraai †	3	104	2	
7	Clement Mvovo ‡	5	179	3	
8	Mdngezi Nabe	7	172	7	
9	Terry Ngqolo	3	88	5	
10	Manzini Tshomela	4	44	3	
11	Nkululeko Badi	3	84	3	
12	Bonelela Mgudiwa	1	33	–	
13	Vuyisile Ngqolo	5	85	–	
14	Dumane Rashe	2	31	2	
15	Andile Blom	5	109	1	
16	Makabongwe Dunjwa	4	59	2	
17	Mziwamaxolo Songca	3	72	4	
18	Sonnyboy Nontshinga	3	38	0	
