= Yassar Cook =

South African cricketer (born 1993)

Personal information
- Full name: Mohamed Yassar Cook
- Born: 8 April 1993 (age 33); Cape Town, South Africa
- Batting: Right-handed
- Bowling: Right-arm medium

Domestic team information
- Years: Team
- 2011/12-2017/18: Gauteng (squad no. 12)
- 2015/16–2016/17: Highveld Lions (squad no. 10)
- 2018/19–2020/21: North West (squad no. 12)
- 2021/22–: Mpumalanga
- Source: Cricinfo, 4 May 2025

Yassar Cook (born 8 April 1993) is a South African cricketer. He was included in the Gauteng cricket team squad for the 2015 Africa T20 Cup. In September 2018, he was named in North West's squad for the 2018 Africa T20 Cup. In April 2021, he was named in Mpumalanga's squad, ahead of the 2021–22 cricket season in South Africa.
