= Jonathan Bird (cricketer) =

South African cricketer (born 2001)

Personal information
- Full name: Jonathan Andrew Bird
- Born: 11 April 2001 (age 25)
- Batting: Left-handed
- Bowling: Left-arm wrist-spin
- Source: Cricinfo, 14 September 2018

Jonathan Bird (born 11 April 2001) is a South African cricketer. He made his Twenty20 debut for Western Province in the 2018 Africa T20 Cup on 14 September 2018. He made his List A debut for Western Province in the 2018–19 CSA Provincial One-Day Challenge on 14 October 2018. In January 2019, he was named in the South Africa national under-19 cricket team's squad, ahead of their tour to India. He made his first-class debut for Western Province in the 2018–19 CSA 3-Day Provincial Cup on 17 January 2019.

In December 2019, he was named in South Africa's squad for the 2020 Under-19 Cricket World Cup. In July 2020, Bird was named as the CSA South Africa U19 Cricketer of the Year. In April 2021, Bird was named in the South Africa Emerging Men's squad for their six-match tour of Namibia. Later the same month, he was named in Western Province's squad, ahead of the 2021–22 cricket season in South Africa.
