= Codi Yusuf =

South African cricketer (born 1998)

Personal information
- Full name: Codi Ethan Yusuf
- Born: 10 April 1998 (age 28); Knysna, Western Cape, South Africa
- Nickname: Codash
- Batting: Right handed
- Bowling: Right-arm Medium
- Role: All-rounder

International information
- National side: South Africa
- Test debut (cap 372): 28 June 2025 v Zimbabwe
- Last Test: 6 July 2025 v Zimbabwe
- Only ODI (cap 161): 7 September 2025 v England

Domestic team information
- Years: Team
- 2018/19: Mpumalanga
- 2019/20–2020/21: Gauteng
- 2021/22–present: Imperial Lions
- 2023–2025: Paarl Royals
- 2025: Durham (squad no. 10)
- 2026: Pretoria Capitals
- 2026: Hampshire

Career statistics
Competition	Test	ODI	FC	LA
Matches	2	1	47	35
Runs scored	35	5	875	159
Batting average	35.00	5.00	17.50	15.90
100s/50s	0/0	0/0	0/1	0/0
Top score	27	5	84	28*
Balls bowled	282	60	7,449	1,502
Wickets	10	0	137	51
Bowling average	12.20	–	30.64	26.62
5 wickets in innings	0	–	5	0
10 wickets in match	0	–	0	0
Best bowling	3/22	–	6/49	4/26
Catches/stumpings	2/–	0/–	14/–	13/–
- Source: Cricinfo, 10 May 2026

Codi Ethan Yusuf (born 10 April 1998) is a South African cricketer. He made his Twenty20 debut for Mpumalanga in the 2018 Africa T20 Cup on 14 September 2018. In September 2019, he was named in Gauteng's squad for the 2019–20 CSA Provincial T20 Cup.

He made his List A debut on 6 October 2019, for Gauteng in the 2019–20 CSA Provincial One-Day Challenge. He made his first-class debut on 17 October 2019, for Gauteng in the 2019–20 CSA 3-Day Provincial Cup. He was the joint-leading wicket-taker in the 2019–20 CSA Provincial One-Day Challenge, with sixteen dismissals in nine matches.

In April 2021, he was named in Gauteng's squad, ahead of the 2021–22 cricket season in South Africa.

Yusuf joined Durham County Cricket Club in April 2025, agreeing a contract to play in six County Championship matches and the T20 Blast group stages.

In March 2026, he signed a contract with Hampshire County Cricket Club to play for the club in the opening block of matches in that year's County Championship.
