= Adriano dos Santos =

South African cricketer (1988-2023)

Personal information
- Born: 26 January 1988; Nelspruit, South Africa
- Died: 29 September 2023 (aged 35); Hazyview, South Africa
- Batting: Right-handed
- Source: Cricinfo, 17 December 2020

Adriano dos Santos (26 January 1988 – 29 September 2023) was a South African cricketer. He played in six first-class and three List A matches from 2006 to 2008.

On his first-class debut in the 2006–07 season, aged 18, Dos Santos scored 133 (out of a team total of 211) and 64 for Mpumalanga against Northerns.

== Death ==
Dos Santos was murdered on 29 September 2023 near Hazyview, South Africa. A suspect fired three shots and Dos Santos was shot in the head.
