= Mbasa Gqadushe =

South African cricketer (born 1986)

Mbasa Gqadushe (born 24 March 1986 in East London, Cape Province) is a South African cricketer who has played seventy seven first class matches for Kwa-Zulu Natal with 2040 runs and 15 wickets. He was included in the KZN Inland squad for the 2015 Africa T20 Cup.

In September 2018, he was named in Mpumalanga's squad for the 2018 Africa T20 Cup.
