= Chibuike Iteogu =

Nigerian cricketer (born 1985)

Personal information
- Born: 24 November 1985 (age 40)

International information
- National side: Nigeria
- Source: Cricinfo, 15 September 2018

Chibuike Iteogu (born 24 November 1985) is a Nigerian cricketer. In September 2018, he was named in Nigeria's squad for the 2018 Africa T20 Cup. He made his Twenty20 debut for Nigeria in the 2018 Africa T20 Cup on 15 September 2018.
