= Dilivio Ridgard =

South African cricketer (born 1998)

Personal information
- Full name: Dilivio Angelo Ridgard
- Born: 16 November 1998 (age 27) (Note: Date of birth listed as 16 November 1998 on CricketArchive and 16 November 1997 on ESPNcricinfo)
- Batting: Left-handed
- Role: Wicket-keeper

Domestic team information
- Years: Team
- 2017/18–2021/22: Free State
- 2022/23–2023/24: KwaZulu-Natal Inland
- 2024/25: Limpopo
- Source: Cricinfo, 25 February 2018

Dilivio Angelo Ridgard (born 16 November 1998) is a South African former cricketer. He made his List A debut for Free State in the 2017–18 CSA Provincial One-Day Challenge on 25 February 2018. In September 2018, he was named in Free State's squad for the 2018 Africa T20 Cup. He made his Twenty20 debut for Free State in the 2018 Africa T20 Cup on 14 September 2018. He made his first-class debut for Free State in the 2018–19 CSA 3-Day Provincial Cup on 11 October 2018. In April 2021, he was named in Free State's squad, ahead of the 2021–22 cricket season in South Africa.

Ridgard announced his retirement from cricket in June 2025.
