= Aldo van den Berg =

South African cricketer

Personal information
- Full name: Adolf Matthys van den Berg
- Born: 9 March 1978; Randfontein, Transvaal, South Africa
- Died: 24 June 2023 (aged 45)
- Nickname: Zolla
- Batting: Right-handed
- Bowling: Right-arm off spin
- Role: All-rounder

Domestic team information
- Years: Team
- 1997–1999: Gauteng
- 1999: South Africa Academy
- 1999–2006: Easterns
- 2006–2007: Mpumalanga

Career statistics
Competition	FC	LA
Matches	34	30
Runs scored	1,349	283
Batting average	22.86	14.15
100s/50s	2/6	0/1
Top score	103	65
Balls bowled	3,448	868
Wickets	50	22
Bowling average	33.32	30.40
5 wickets in innings	3	0
10 wickets in match	0	n/a
Best bowling	5/49	3/36
Catches/stumpings	15/–	6/1
- Source: ESPNCricinfo, 1 September 2015

Adolf Matthys "Aldo" van den Berg (9 March 1978 – 24 June 2023) was a South African cricketer whose domestic career spanned from 1997 to 2007. A right-handed all-rounder, he played matches for Gauteng, Easterns (which he briefly captained), and Mpumalanga.

Born in Randfontein, van den Berg played for a representative South African Schools team during the 1996–97 season, and the following season, aged 19, made his senior debut for Gauteng, against Easterns in the one-day Standard Bank League. He played two more matches in the same competition the next season, and in July 1999 was selected to tour Ireland and Scotland with the South African Academy team, making his first-class debut as the side's captain. For the 1999–00 domestic season, van den Berg switched to playing for Easterns, where he became a regular in both the one-day and three-day formats. Prior to the 2006–07 season, he switched to Mpumalanga, which had been granted first-class status on a trial basis. In his only season, he was the team's leading wicket-taker in both the three-day and the one-day competition. However, the team did not perform well enough to secure a first-class status for the following season, which meant an end to van den Berg's career at that level.

Van den Berg captained Easterns in four first-class matches during the 2001–02 season, in the absence of the regular captain, Derek Crookes. Of the four matches, his team won two, lost one, and drew one. In 34 first-class matches overall, van den Berg recorded two centuries and six half-centuries, with his highest score, 103, coming for Easterns against the touring India A team in March 2002. The other century was made for Mpumalanga against Namibia in November 2006, a score of 100 not out out of a team total of 184. Van den Berg's off-spin garnered him 50 first-class wickets at an average of 33.32, including three five-wicket hauls. Two of those were made for Mpumalanga during the 2006–07 season, while his best figures, 5/49, came against Boland in March 2004. Van den Berg's returns in the one-day format were much diminished, with his 30 matches yielding only 22 wickets and a single half-century (65 against Free State in March 2006).

Van den Berg's death was reported in June 2023.
