= Francis Chibuike =

Nigerian footballer

Nnah Francis Chibuike
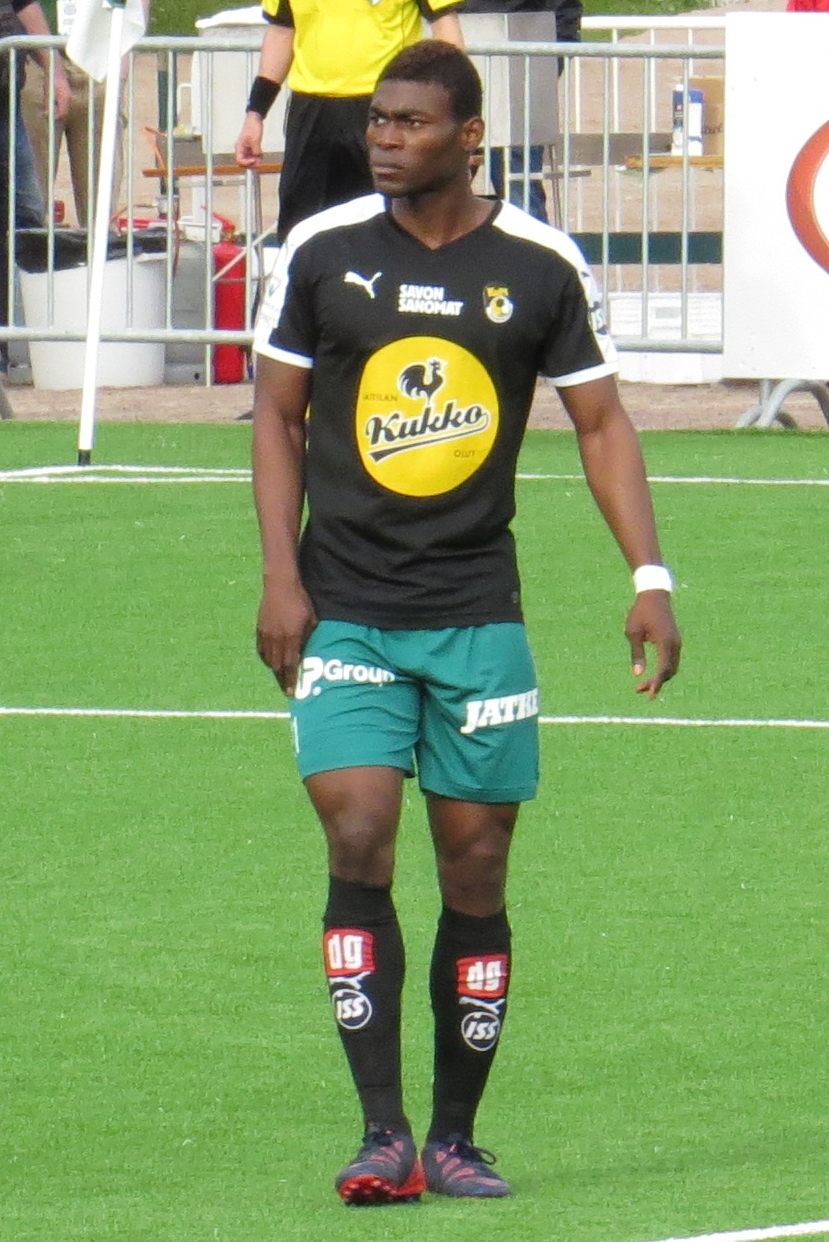

Personal information
- Full name: Francis Chibuike Nnah
- Date of birth: 7 June 1993 (age 33)
- Place of birth: Orile Ajegunle, Nigeria
- Height: 1.90 m (6 ft 3 in)
- Position: Striker

Team information
- Current team: KUPS
- Number: 9

Senior career*
Years	Team	Apps	(Gls)
2014–2015	KuPS	31	(17)
2015	MP	17	(5)
Total		38	(23)
- * Club domestic league appearances and goals as of 4 October 2015

Francis Chibuike (born 7 June 1993) is a football player from Nigeria. He currently plays for the Finnish Ykkönen side, Mikkelin Palloilijat.
