= Jurie Snyman =

South African cricketer (born 1995)

Personal information
- Born: 20 February 1995 (age 31); Heidelberg, Gauteng, South Africa
- Batting: Left-handed
- Bowling: Right-arm off-spin

Domestic team information
- Years: Team
- 2012/13–2021/22: Easterns
- 2022/23–present: Mpumalanga

Career statistics
Competition	FC	LA	T20
Matches	46	65	39
Runs scored	2,234	2,343	828
Batting average	32.85	38.40	28.55
100s/50s	6/11	4/17	0/6
Top score	200*	136	80
Balls bowled	2,623	1,339	336
Wickets	41	36	14
Bowling average	32.53	28.47	29.11
5 wickets in innings	1	0	0
10 wickets in match	0	–	–
Best bowling	5/55	4/34	3/16
Catches/stumpings	19/–	15/–	16/–
- Source: Cricinfo, 6 July 2025

Jurie Snyman (born 20 February 1995) is a South African cricketer. He made his first-class debut for Easterns in the CSA Provincial Three-Day Competition on 1 November 2012. He moved to Mpumalanga before the 2022–23 season.

Snyman was the leading run-scorer in the 2017–18 CSA Provincial One-Day Challenge tournament for Easterns, with 378 runs in six matches.

In September 2018, he was named in Easterns' squad for the 2018 Africa T20 Cup. In September 2019, he was named in Easterns' squad for the 2019–20 CSA Provincial T20 Cup. In April 2021, he was named in Easterns' squad, ahead of the 2021–22 cricket season in South Africa.

Snyman's highest first-class score is 200 not out, which he made for Mpumalanga against Easterns in 2023–24, when he captained Mpumalanga to its first first-class victory.
