= Don Radebe =

South African cricketer (born 1997)

Personal information
- Born: 9 February 1997 (age 29)
- Source: Cricinfo, 14 September 2018

Don Radebe (born 9 February 1997) is a South African cricketer. He made his Twenty20 debut for Limpopo in the 2018 Africa T20 Cup on 14 September 2018. In September 2019, he was named in Limpopo's squad for the 2019–20 CSA Provincial T20 Cup. In April 2021, he was named in Limpopo's squad, ahead of the 2021–22 cricket season in South Africa. He made his List A cricket debut for Limpopo on 16 September 2023 in 2023 CSA One-Day Cup. He made his First-class cricket debut for Limpopo on 2 November 2023 in 2023–24 CSA 4-Day Series.
