= Kgaudisa Molefe =

South African cricketer (born 2000)

Personal information
- Born: 2 September 2000 (age 26)
- Source: Cricinfo, 9 November 2017

Kgaudisa Molefe (born 2 September 2000) is a South African cricketer. He made his first-class debut for Gauteng in the 2017–18 Sunfoil 3-Day Cup on 9 November 2017. He made his List A debut for Gauteng in the 2017–18 CSA Provincial One-Day Challenge on 12 November 2017.

In December 2017, he was named in South Africa's squad for the 2018 Under-19 Cricket World Cup. In August 2018, he was awarded a senior contract by Cricket South Africa ahead of the 2018–19 domestic season. In September 2018, he was named in Gauteng's squad for the 2018 Africa T20 Cup. He made his Twenty20 debut for Gauteng in the 2018 Africa T20 Cup on 14 September 2018. In January 2019, he was named in the South Africa national under-19 cricket team's squad, ahead of their tour to India.
