= Lizo Makhosi =

South African cricketer (born 1999)

Personal information
- Born: 19 February 1999 (age 27)
- Source: Cricinfo, 11 October 2018

Lizo Makhosi (born 19 February 1999) is a South African cricketer. He made his first-class debut for Border in the 2018–19 CSA 3-Day Provincial Cup on 11 October 2018. He made his List A debut for Border in the 2018–19 CSA Provincial One-Day Challenge on 13 January 2019. He made his Twenty20 debut on 20 February 2021, for Warriors in the 2020–21 CSA T20 Challenge.
