= Bonga Makaka =

South African cricketer

Personal information
- Born: 5 April 2000 (age 26)
- Source: Cricinfo, 13 January 2018

Bonga Makaka (born 5 April 2000) is a South African cricketer. He made his first-class debut for Western Province in the 2017–18 Sunfoil 3-Day Cup on 11 January 2018. He made his List A debut for Western Province in the 2017–18 CSA Provincial One-Day Challenge on 14 January 2018. In January 2019, he was named in the South Africa national under-19 cricket team's squad, ahead of their tour to India.
