= Musawenkosi Twala =

South African cricketer (born 2000)

Personal information
- Born: 12 July 2000 (age 26)

Domestic team information
- Years: Team
- 2022-2024: Multiply Titans
- Current: Mpumalanga Rhinos Bovey Tracey CC (loan)
- Source: Cricinfo, 26 October 2019

Musawenkosi Twala (born 12 July 2000) is a South African cricketer. He made his first-class debut on 24 October 2019, for Easterns in the 2019–20 CSA 3-Day Provincial Cup. He made his List A debut on 3 April 2022, for Easterns in the 2021–22 CSA One-Day Cup.
