= Marco Marais =

South African cricketer

Personal information
- Born: 17 October 1993 (age 33); Worcester, South Africa
- Batting: Right-handed
- Bowling: Right-arm medium-fast
- Source: Cricinfo, 1 September 2015

Marco Marais (born 17 October 1993) is a South African cricketer. He was included in the Border cricket team squad for the 2015 Africa T20 Cup.

In November 2017, he scored 300 not out from 191 deliveries, batting for Border against Eastern Province in the 2017–18 Sunfoil 3-Day Cup. This was the fastest triple century in first-class cricket, the ninth triple century in first-class cricket in South Africa and the first in the country since 2010. He was the leading run-scorer in the 2017–18 Sunfoil 3-Day Cup for Border, with 810 runs in nine matches.

In August 2018, he was named in Border's squad for the 2018 Africa T20 Cup. In Border's opening match of the tournament, against Namibia, Marais scored 103 not out, although Border lost the match by five wickets. On the following day, Marais scored his second century of the tournament, making 106 not out. He scored 295 runs in four matches, with Cricket South Africa calling him the standout player of the tournament. He finished the tournament as the leading run-scorer, with 359 runs in six matches. The following August, he was named the Africa T20 Cup Player of the Tournament at Cricket South Africa's annual award ceremony.

In October 2018, he was named in Nelson Mandela Bay Giants' squad for the first edition of the Mzansi Super League T20 tournament. In September 2019, he was named in the squad for the Nelson Mandela Bay Giants team for the 2019 Mzansi Super League tournament. Later the same month, he was named in Eastern Province's squad for the 2019–20 CSA Provincial T20 Cup. In April 2021, he was named in Border's squad, ahead of the 2021–22 cricket season in South Africa. In September 2021, Marais signed to play domestic cricket in Ireland for the 2022 season.
