= Liam Peters =

South African cricketer (born 1997)

Personal information
- Born: 24 January 1997 (age 29)
- Source: Cricinfo, 15 September 2018

Liam Peters (born 24 January 1997) is a South African cricketer. He made his Twenty20 debut for Mpumalanga in the 2018 Africa T20 Cup on 15 September 2018. In April 2021, he was named in Mpumalanga's squad, ahead of the 2021–22 cricket season in South Africa. He made his List A cricket debut for Limpopo on 9 December 2022 in 2022 CSA Provincial One-Day Challenge. He made his First-class cricket debut for Limpopo on 20 October 2022 in 2022–23 CSA 4-Day Series.
