= Nono Pongolo =

South African cricketer (born 1989)

Personal information
- Full name: Zanzima Pongolo
- Born: 18 August 1989 (age 37); Langa, Cape Town, South Africa
- Batting: Right-handed
- Bowling: Right-arm medium
- Role: Bowler

Domestic team information
- Years: Team
- 2014/15–2019/20: Gauteng
- 2015/16–2020/21: Lions
- 2018–2019: Jozi Stars
- 2021/22: North West

Career statistics
Competition	FC	LA	T20
Matches	64	55	51
Runs scored	1,576	637	292
Batting average	19.94	20.54	24.33
100s/50s	0/4	0/1	0/0
Top score	57	50	37*
Balls bowled	7,135	1,994	687
Wickets	130	54	35
Bowling average	29.05	30.44	26.17
5 wickets in innings	4	2	1
10 wickets in match	0	0	0
Best bowling	5/50	6/22	6/20
Catches/stumpings	39/–	17/–	24/–
- Source: ESPNcricinfo, 30 December 2022

Nono Pongolo (born 18 August 1989) is a South African professional first class cricketer. He was included in the Gauteng cricket team for the 2015 Africa T20 Cup. In September 2018, he was named in Gauteng's squad for the 2018 Africa T20 Cup. In September 2019, he was named in the squad for the Jozi Stars team for the 2019 Mzansi Super League tournament. Later the same month, he was named as the captain of Gauteng's squad for the 2019–20 CSA Provincial T20 Cup. In April 2021, he was named in North West's squad, ahead of the 2021–22 cricket season in South Africa.
