= Zakir Kathrada =

South African cricketer (born 1991)

Personal information
- Born: 17 August 1991 (age 35); Cape Town, South Africa
- Source: ESPNcricinfo, 20 October 2016

Zakir Kathrada (born 17 August 1991) is a South African cricketer. He made his first-class debut for Western Province in the 2011–12 CSA Provincial Three-Day Challenge on 1 March 2012.

He was the leading run-scorer in the 2017–18 CSA Provincial One-Day Challenge tournament for Northern Cape, with 250 runs in eight matches.
