= Jason Niemand =

South African cricketer (born 1998)

Personal information
- Born: 30 November 1998 (age 27)
- Source: Cricinfo, 12 March 2017

Jason Niemand (born 30 November 1998) is a South African cricketer. He made his List A debut for Border in the 2016–17 CSA Provincial One-Day Challenge on 12 March 2017.

In December 2017, he was named in South Africa's squad for the 2018 Under-19 Cricket World Cup. He made his first-class debut for Border in the 2017–18 Sunfoil 3-Day Cup on 15 February 2018. In August 2018, he was awarded a senior contract by Cricket South Africa ahead of the 2018-19 domestic season.

In August 2018, he was named in Border's squad for the 2018 Africa T20 Cup. He made his Twenty20 debut for Border in the 2018 Africa T20 Cup on 14 September, 2018. He was the leading run-scorer for Border in the 2018–19 CSA Provincial One-Day Challenge, with 180 runs in nine matches. In April 2021, he was named in Border's squad, ahead of the 2021–22 cricket season in South Africa.
