= Blake Schraader =

South African cricketer (born 1994)

Personal information
- Born: 8 June 1994 (age 32)
- Source: Cricinfo, 14 September 2018

Blake Schraader (born 8 June 1994) is a South African cricketer. He made his Twenty20 debut for Mpumalanga in the 2018 Africa T20 Cup on 14 September 2018. In September 2019, he was named in Northern Cape's squad for the 2019–20 CSA Provincial T20 Cup. He made his List A debut on 24 November 2019, for Northern Cape in the 2019–20 CSA Provincial One-Day Challenge. He made his first-class debut on 28 November 2019, for Northern Cape in the 2019–20 CSA 3-Day Provincial Cup. In April 2021, he was named in Mpumalanga's squad, ahead of the 2021–22 cricket season in South Africa.
