= Jon Hinrichsen =

South African cricketer (born 1999)

Personal information
- Born: 17 March 1999 (age 27)
- Source: Cricinfo, 11 October 2018

Jon Hinrichsen (born 17 March 1999) is a South African cricketer. He made his first-class debut for North West in the 2018–19 CSA 3-Day Provincial Cup on 11 October 2018. He made his List A debut for North West in the 2018–19 CSA Provincial One-Day Challenge on 17 February 2019. In September 2019, he was named in North West's squad for the 2019–20 CSA Provincial T20 Cup. He made his Twenty20 debut for North West in the 2019–20 CSA Provincial T20 Cup on 14 September 2019. In April 2021, he was named in Mpumalanga's squad, ahead of the 2021–22 cricket season in South Africa.
