= Muhammed Mayet =

South African cricketer (born 1998)

Personal information
- Born: 19 February 1998 (age 28)
- Batting: Right-handed
- Bowling: Right-arm medium
- Source: Cricinfo, 26 October 2017

Muhammed Mayet (born 19 February 1998) is a South African cricketer. He made his first-class debut for Gauteng in the 2017–18 Sunfoil 3-Day Cup on 26 October 2017. He made his List A debut for Gauteng in the 2017–18 CSA Provincial One-Day Challenge on 29 October 2017.

In September 2018, he was named in Gauteng's squad for the 2018 Africa T20 Cup. He made his Twenty20 debut for Gauteng in the 2018 Africa T20 Cup on 14 September 2018.
