= Benjamin van Niekerk =

South African cricketer (born 1996)

Personal information
- Born: 4 January 1996 (age 30)
- Source: Cricinfo, 14 September 2018

Benjamin van Niekerk (born 4 January 1996) is a South African cricketer. He made his Twenty20 debut for Mpumalanga in the 2018 Africa T20 Cup on 14 September 2018. In April 2021, he was named in Mpumalanga's squad, ahead of the 2021–22 cricket season in South Africa.
