= Karabo Mogotsi =

South African cricketer (born 1995)

Personal information
- Born: 24 April 1995 (age 31); Soweto, South Africa
- Source: ESPNcricinfo, 22 October 2016

Karabo Mogotsi (born 24 April 1995) is a South African cricketer. He made his first-class debut for Gauteng in the 2014–15 Sunfoil 3-Day Cup on 11 December 2014.

In September 2018, he was named in Free State's squad for the 2018 Africa T20 Cup. He was the leading run-scorer for Free State in the 2018–19 CSA Provincial One-Day Challenge, with 177 runs in eight matches.
