= Thula Ngcobo =

South African cricketer (born 1996)

Personal information
- Born: 10 February 1996 (age 30)
- Source: Cricinfo, 27 February 2021

Thula Ngcobo (born 10 February 1996) is a South African professional cricketer. He made his first-class debut on 16 November 2017, for KwaZulu-Natal in the 2017–18 Sunfoil 3-Day Cup. He made his List A debut on 19 November 2017, for KwaZulu-Natal in the 2017–18 CSA Provincial One-Day Challenge. He made his Twenty20 debut on 14 September 2018, for KwaZulu-Natal in the 2018 Africa T20 Cup. In April 2021, he was named in KwaZulu-Natal Inland's squad, ahead of the 2021–22 cricket season in South Africa.
