= Limpopo cricket team =

Cricket team

Limpopo Impalas
Team information
- Founded: 2006
- Home ground: Polokwane Cricket Club Ground, Polokwane
- Official website: Official website

Limpopo cricket team, also called the Limpopo Impalas, are a first-class cricket team representing Limpopo, the northernmost province of South Africa. Limpopo Impala Cricket has its headquarters in Polokwane, and the team plays home games at the Polokwane Cricket Club Ground.

== First-class history ==
When Cricket South Africa decided to expand the Provincial Three-Day Challenge in 2006, Limpopo were one of five provincial teams (along with Kei, KwaZulu-Natal Inland, Mpumalanga and South Western Districts) elevated to first-class status.

Limpopo played eight first-class matches in the 2006–07 season, losing five and drawing the other three. They played seven matches in the Provincial One-Day Challenge, winning two and losing five.

Their highest score in each competition was made by Andrew Galloway. In the first-class match against Free State he scored 127 off 123 balls in the first innings to help Limpopo to their highest score of 402 for 7 declared. He finished the season with 421 runs at an average of 42.10, scored at a run-rate of 108.22 runs per 100 balls. The five matches he played in 2006–07 were Galloway's whole first-class career. In the one-day competition he hit 91 not out off 88 balls against North West.

The other prominent batsmen in the first-class matches were Pieter Haasbroek, who scored 497 runs at 31.06, and Johannes Shokane, who scored 437 runs at 36.41, including one century. In each case 2006–07 gave them their only first-class matches. The two main bowlers were the pacemen Tumi Masekela, who took 22 wickets at 24.18 and later had a long career in first-class cricket for other provincial teams, and Sammy Letsoalo, who took 22 wickets at 29.40 and later played a few matches for North West.

In a competition that was itself of borderline first-class status, Cricket South Africa considered Limpopo's performance (and those of Kei and Mpumalanga) too weak to justify their place, and after one season, all three teams were omitted. Limpopo continued to play in competitions at sub-first-class level. In August 2018, they were included in the 2018 Africa T20 Cup tournament.

Limpopo played no further first-class cricket until the 2022–23 season, when they and Mpumalanga were readmitted to the South African first-class competition. They registered their first first-class victory in November 2022 when they beat Mpumalanga in Polokwane by nine wickets; their wicketkeeper Sizwe Masondo scored 157 off 184 balls batting at number eight and took six catches.

Limpopo won the 2023–24 CSA Provincial T20 Cup, beating Northern Cape in the final in April 2024.

== Current squad Impalas ==
Squad for 2026/27 Season. Players in bold have played international cricket.

Name	Nationality	Birth date	Batting style	Bowling style	Notes
Batters
Christoffel Klijnhans	South Africa	9 February 2000 (age 26)	Left-handed		
Liam Peters	South Africa	24 January 1997 (age 29)	Left-handed	Right arm seam	
Tylor Trenoweth	South Africa	20 January 1994 (age 32)	Left-handed		
Keeper
Shelton Ngobeni	South Africa		Left-handed		
All-Rounders
Abdallah Bayoumy	South Africa	8 May 2004 (age 22)	Right-handed	Right-arm Seam	
Ernest Kemm	South Africa	18 November 1990 (age 35)	Left-handed	Left-arm Orthodox Spin	
Bowlers
Irvin Modimokoane	South Africa	3 October 1998 (age 27)	Right-handed	Right-arm Seam	
Atwell Mokgoloboto	South Africa	6 April 2000 (age 26)	Right-handed	Right-arm orthodox spin	
Marcello Piedt	South Africa	23 September 1992 (age 33)	Right-handed	Right-arm Seam	
Maphekgola Pootona	South Africa	28 August 2003 (age 23)	Right-handed	Right-arm Seam	
Don Radebe	South Africa	9 February 1997 (age 29)	Right-handed	Right-arm Seam	

== External sources ==
- Lists of matches played by Limpopo at CricketArchive
- Limpopo Impala Cricket
