= Mpumalanga cricket team =

South African cricket team

Mpumalanga Rhinos
Personnel
- Captain: Muhammed Mayet
- Coach: Mbasa Gqadushe
- Chief executive: Jaco Visagie

Team information
- Colours: Grey and black
- Founded: 1998
- Home ground: White River Country Club, White River
- Official website: Official website

Mpumalanga, also known as the Mpumalanga Rhinos, are a South African first-class cricket team representing the province of Mpumalanga. They have their headquarters in Witbank and play their home games at Uplands College in White River.

== First-class history ==
When Cricket South Africa decided to expand the Provincial Three-Day Challenge in 2006, Mpumalanga was one of five provincial teams (along with Kei, KwaZulu-Natal Inland, Limpopo and South Western Districts) elevated to first-class status.

Mpumalanga played eight first-class matches in the 2006–07 season. They lost six of them and drew the other two. Four of the defeats were by an innings. They also lost all eight of their matches in the Provincial One-Day Challenge.

Their captain in all matches in 2006–07 was Roelof Hugo, who was also the wicket-keeper. He scored 451 runs in the first-class matches during the season at an average of 28.18, took 21 catches behind the stumps and effected one stumping. He later played for South Western Districts. The most successful batsman in the first-class matches for the team that season was Paul van den Berg, who scored 524 runs at 43.66 with one century and also took 16 wickets at 33.43. He later played for Easterns. Adolf van den Berg was the most successful bowler, with 20 wickets at 34.30 as well as 414 runs at 31.84 with one century. In the innings loss to Northerns, the 18-year-old Adriano dos Santos, on his first-class debut, made 133 (out of a team total of 211) and 64. He later played a few matches for Eastern Province.

In a competition that was itself of borderline first-class status, Cricket South Africa considered Mpumalanga's performance (and those of Kei and Limpopo) too weak to justify their place, and after one season, all three teams were omitted. They then played in various sub-first-class competitions. In August 2018, they were included in the 2018 Africa T20 Cup tournament.

Mpumalanga played no further first-class cricket until the 2022–23 season, when both they (now known as the Mpumalanga Rhinos) and Limpopo (the Limpopo Impalas) were readmitted to the South African first-class competition. In 2022–23 Mpumalanga won none of their six matches and finished last in Division 2 of the CSA 4-Day Domestic Series. In 2023–24 they won one of their six matches and again finished last. In 2024–25 they won two and lost one of their six matches, and finished third of the seven teams in Division 2.

At the end of the 2024–25 season, Mpumalanga's highest individual first-class score is 200 not out by Jurie Snyman against Easterns in 2023–24, when Snyman captained the team to its first first-class victory. The best bowling figures are 7 for 51 by Kieran Kenny against Limpopo in 2022–23.

== Current squad ==
Squad for 2026/27 Season. Players in bold have played international cricket.

Name	Nationality	Birth date	Batting style	Bowling style	Notes
Batters
Yassar Cook	South Africa	8 April 1993 (age 33)	Right-handed	Right-arm seam	
Muhammed Mayet	South Africa	19 February 1998 (age 28)	Right-handed	Right-arm seam	
Karabo Mogotsi	South Africa	24 April 1995 (age 31)	Right-handed	Right-arm orthodox spin	
Benjamin Van Niekerk	South Africa	4 January 1996 (age 30)	Right-handed	Right-arm orthodox spin	High-performance Contract
Wicket-keepers
Zakir Kathrada	South Africa	17 August 1991 (age 35)	Right-handed		
Garnett Tarr	South Africa	2 July 2000 (age 26)	Right-handed		
All-rounders
Bryn Brokensha	South Africa		Right-handed	Right arm seam	Rookie Contract
Aubrey Swanepoel	South Africa	18 June 1989 (age 37)	Right-handed	Right-arm orthodox spin	
Bowlers
Jon Hinrichsen	South Africa	17 March 1999 (age 27)	Right-handed	Right arm seam	
Thobile Hlatuka	South Africa	14 October 2001 (age 24)	Right-handed	Right arm seam	
Ricus Kramm	South Africa	18 June 2004 (age 22)	Right-handed	Right arm seam	Rookie contract
Tetelo Maphaka	South Africa	21 September 2000 (age 26)	Left-handed	Left arm orthodox spin	

== External sources ==
- Lists of matches played by Mpumalanga at CricketArchive
- Mpumalanga Rhinos website
