= List of 2027 SA20 auctions and personnel signings =

2027 SA20 players auctions

General information
- Sport: Cricket
- Date: 7 October 2026
- Time: 14:00 SAST
- Location: Johannesburg, South Africa

Overview
- 19 total selections
- League: SA20
- Team: 6

This is a list of auction and personnel signings for the 2027 SA20 cricket tournament.

== Background ==
A total of 789 players registered for the auction, with 156 shortlisted for the SA20 Season 5 auction, which will take place on 7 October. The shortlist comprises 95 South African players and 61 overseas players. However, only 19 slots remain to be filled across the four teams participating in the auction, with Durban's Super Giants and Paarl Royals having already completed their 19-player squads.

== Pre-auction squad arrangements ==
=== Retained, pre-signed players and wildcard signings ===
Following the conclusion of the retention and pre-signing window ahead of the 2027 SA20, franchises announced their retained and pre-signed players before the auction.

Durban's Super Giants	Joburg Super Kings	MI Cape Town	Paarl Royals	Pretoria Capitals	Sunrisers Eastern Cape
Retained	Retained	Retained	Retained	Retained	Retained
Aiden Markram; (England) Jos Buttler; (New Zealand) Kane Williamson; (Cricket West Indies) Sunil Narine; Gerald Coetzee; (England) Liam Livingstone; Evan Jones; (New Zealand) Devon Conway; Simon Harmer; Marques Ackerman; Eathan Bosch; Tony de Zorzi; David Bedingham; Daryn Dupavillon; Kwena Maphaka (U23); Andile Simelane (U23); Kyle Simmonds	Donovan Ferreira; (Cricket West Indies) Akeal Hosein; (England) James Vince; Dian Forrester; Leus Du Plooy; Prenelan Subrayen; Jarren Bacher (U23); Janco Smit; Duan Jansen; Matthew de Villiers; Rilee Rossouw	(Afghanistan) Rashid Khan; Corbin Bosch; Ryan Rickelton; (Cricket West Indies) Nicholas Pooran; George Linde; Jason Smith; Tristan Luus (U23); Dane Piedt; Thomas Kaber; Reeza Hendricks; Tiaan van Vuuren	David Miller; (Zimbabwe) Sikandar Raza; Lhuan-dre Pretorius (U23); Hardus Viljoen; (England) Dan Lawrence; J. J. Basson (U23); Kyle Verreyenne; Ottniel Baartman; Bjorn Fortuin; (Cricket West Indies) Gudakesh Motie; (Afghanistan) Mujeeb Ur Rahman; Keagan Lion-Cachet; Delano Potgieter; Nqobani Mokoena (U23); Rubin Hermann; (England) Thomas Rew; (Jersey) Asa Tribe	Keshav Maharaj; Lungi Ngidi; Dewald Brevis (U23); Connor Esterhuizen; Wihan Lubbe; Lizaad Williams; Bayanda Majola (U23); (Cricket West Indies) Sherfane Rutherford; Bryce Parsons; Gideon Peters; Codi Yusuf	Tristan Stubbs; Quinton de Kock; Matthew Breetzke; Jordan Hermann; Anrich Nortje; (New Zealand) Adam Milne; Senuran Muthusamy; Lutho Sipamla; (England) James Coles; Patrick Kruger; Mitchell van Buuren; (England) Lewis Gregory; JP King (U23); CJ King (U23)
Pre-signed	Pre-signed	Pre-signed	Pre-signed	Pre-signed	Pre-signed
(England) Sam Curran	(Cricket West Indies) Jason Holder	(England) Will Jacks	(Afghanistan) Azmatullah Omarzai	(England) Phil Salt; (Australia) Matthew Short	(Australia) Mitchell Marsh; (Bangladesh) Rishad Hossain
Wildcard	Wildcard	Wildcard	Wildcard	Wildcard	Wildcard
Henrich Klaasen	(England) Jamie Overton	Kagiso Rabada	(England) Joe Root	(Cricket West Indies) Andre Russell	Marco Jansen

=== Released players ===
Durban's Super Giants	Joburg Super Kings	MI Cape Town	Paarl Royals	Pretoria Capitals	Sunrisers Eastern Cape
(Afghanistan) Noor Ahmad; Dayyaan Galiem; (Bangladesh) Taijul Islam; Gysbert Wege (U23); David Wiese	Faf du Plessis; Wiaan Mulder; Nandre Burger; (England) Richard Gleeson; (Cricket West Indies) Brandon King; Rivaldo Moonsamy; (England) Michael Pepper; (United States) Shubham Ranjane; Steve Stolk (U23); Imran Tahir; Neil Timmers (U23); (England) Reece Topley; Jorich van Schalkwyk (U23); (England) Dan Worrall	(New Zealand) Trent Boult; (Afghanistan) Karim Janat; Dan Lategan (U23); (England) Tom Moores; (Cricket West Indies) Kieron Pollard; Dwaine Pretorius; Tabraiz Shamsi; Jacques Snyman; Rassie van der Dussen	Okuhle Cele; (Sri Lanka) Vishen Halambage; (Sri Lanka) Eshan Malinga; Nqaba Peter; (Cricket West Indies) Rovman Powell; (Afghanistan) Waqar Salamkheil	(Cricket West Indies) Roston Chase; (England) Jordan Cox; Junaid Dawood; Keith Dudgeon; (Cricket West Indies) Shai Hope; (England) Will Jacks; (England) Saqib Mahmood; Sibonelo Makhanya; (England) Tymal Mills; (England) Craig Overton; Meeka-eel Prince (U23); (England) Will Smeed; Daniel Smith	(England) Jonny Bairstow; (Afghanistan) AM Ghazanfar; Beyers Swanepoel; (England) Chris Wood

== Summary ==
Pre-auction summary
Team	Retained		Pre-signed		Wildcard	Total	Slots to fill in auction	Funds remaining (in ZAR millions)
Team	Domestic	Overseas	Domestic	Overseas	Wildcard	Total	Slots to fill in auction	Funds remaining (in ZAR millions)
Durban's Super Giants	12	5	–	1	1	19	0	N/A
Joburg Super Kings	9	2	–	1	1	12	6	20.6
MI Cape Town	9	2	–	1	1	13	6	9.35
Paarl Royals	8	6	-	1	1	19	0	N/A
Pretoria Capitals	10	1	–	2	1	14	5	1.475
Sunrisers Eastern Cape	11	3	–	2	1	17	2	3.6

== Player auction ==
A total of 156 players (95 South Africa and 61 overseas) entered the auction pool, with only 19 open places (5 South Africa and 14 overseas slot).

Name	National team	Playing role	Price (in ZAR)	Team	Notes
Shimron Hetmyer	West Indies	Batsman	1,500,000	MI Cape Town	
Wiaan Mulder	South Africa	All-rounder	2,600,000	MI Cape Town	
Faf du Plessis	South Africa	Batsman	2,700,000	Joburg Super Kings	
Jason Rowles	South Africa	All-rounder	2,900,000	Joburg Super Kings	
Trent Boult	New Zealand	Fast-bowler	1,500,000	MI Cape Town	
Nandre Burger	South Africa	Fast-bowler	500,000	Sunrisers Eastern Cape	
Dayyaan Galiem	South Africa	All-rounder	375,000	Joburg Super Kings	
Kieron Pollard	West Indies	All-rounder	1,500,000	Joburg Super Kings	
Craig Overton	England	All-rounder	1,500,000	Sunrisers Eastern Cape	
Blessing Muzarabani	Zimbabwe	Fast-bowler	500,000	Joburg Super Kings	
Daniel Smith	South Africa	Wicket-keeper	200,000	MI Cape Town	
Rassie van der Dussen	South Africa	Batsman	500,000	Pretoria Capitals	
Andries Gous	United States	Wicket-keeper	1,000,000	Joburg Super Kings	
Lehan Botha	South Africa	All-rounder	200,000	MI Cape Town	
Keemo Paul	West Indies	All-rounder	200,000	Pretoria Capitals	
Oliver Whitehead	South Africa	All-rounder	200,000	MI Cape Town	
Ackeem Auguste	West Indies	Batsman	200,000	Pretoria Capitals	
Josh Breed	South Africa	All-rounder	200,000	Pretoria Capitals	
Temba Bavuma	South Africa	Batsman	200,000	Pretoria Capitals	

== Support staff changes ==
Support staff changes for the 2027 SA20
Team	Position	Outgoing	Incoming	Ref.
Joburg Super Kings	Head Coach	Stephen Fleming	Albie Morkel	
Joburg Super Kings	Assistant Coach	Wandile Gwavu	Wandile Gwavu; Rivash Gobind	
Joburg Super Kings	Batting Coach	Albie Morkel	TBA	
Joburg Super Kings	Bowling Coach	Eric Simons	Allan Donald	
Joburg Super Kings	Fielding Coach	Wandile Gwavu	Pierre de Bruyn	
