= 2027 Joburg Super Kings season =

Joburg Super Kings in 2027 SA20

Joburg Super Kings
2027 season
- Coach: Albie Morkel
- Captain(s): Faf du Plessis
- Home ground: Wanderers Stadium
- League: SA20
- League Stage: –
- Playoffs: –

The 2027 Joburg Super Kings season is the fifth season of the franchise in the SA20. The team is captained by Faf du Plessis and coached by Albie Morkel.

== Background ==
Source:

== Current squad ==
- Players with international caps are listed in **bold**.
- * denotes a player who was unavailable for the season.

No.	Name	Nat.	Birth date	Batting style	Bowling style	Notes
Batters
13	**Faf du Plessis**	(South Africa)	13 July 1984 (age 42)	Right-handed	Right-arm leg break	
4	**Rilee Rossouw**	(South Africa)	9 October 1989 (age 37)	Left-handed	Right-arm off break	
9	**James Vince**	(England)	14 March 1991 (age 35)	Right-handed	Right-arm medium	Overseas
76	Leus Du Plooy	(South Africa)	12 January 1995 (age 31)	Left-handed	Left-arm orthodox	
Wicket-keepers
68	**Andries Gous**	(United States)	24 November 1993 (age 32)	Right-handed	Right-arm medium	Overseas
	**Aneurin Donald**	(England)	20 December 1996 (age 29)	Right-handed	Right-arm off break	Overseas
2	**Donovan Ferreira**	(South Africa)	21 July 1998 (age 28)	Right-handed	Right-arm off break	
30	Matthew de Villiers	(South Africa)	21 November 2000 (age 25)	Right-handed	Right-arm medium	
All-rounders
98	**Jason Holder**	(Cricket West Indies)	5 November 1991 (age 35)	Right-handed	Right-arm medium-fast	Overseas
88	**Jamie Overton**	(England)	10 April 1994 (age 32)	Right-handed	Right-arm fast	Overseas (Note: Jamie Overton was signed as Wildcard player and his salary is outside JSK's auction purse.)
2	**Dayyaan Galiem**	(South Africa)	2 January 1997 (age 29)	Right-handed	Right-arm medium-fast	
14	**Dian Forrester**	(South Africa)	7 June 2000 (age 26)	Left-handed	Right-arm medium	
22	Jarren Bacher	(South Africa)	22 November 2003 (age 22)	Right-handed	Right-arm off break	
49	Jason Rowles	(South Africa)	14 April 2008 (age 18)	Left-handed	Left-arm orthodox	
Pace bowlers
40	**Blessing Muzarabani**	(Zimbabwe)	2 October 1996 (age 30)	Right-handed	Right-arm fast-medium	Overseas
77	**Duan Jansen**	(South Africa)	1 May 2000 (age 26)	Right-handed	Left-arm fast	
38	Janco Smit	(South Africa)	2 February 2001 (age 25)	Right-handed	Right-arm fast	
Spin bowlers
21	**Akeal Hosein**	(Cricket West Indies)	25 April 1993 (age 33)	Left-handed	Left-arm orthodox	Overseas
23	**Prenelan Subrayen**	(South Africa)	23 December 1993 (age 32)	Right-handed	Right-arm off break	

== League stage ==
The full fixture list was released on 23 July 2026.

Match 2
18 January 2027
17:30 (D/N)
Scorecard

Paarl Royals (H)	v	Joburg Super Kings

Boland Park, Paarl

Match 4
20 January 2027
17:30 (D/N)
Scorecard

MI Cape Town (H)	v	Joburg Super Kings

Newlands Cricket Ground, Cape Town

Match 8
23 January 2027
17:30 (D/N)
Scorecard

Joburg Super Kings (H)	v	Sunrisers Eastern Cape

Wanderers Stadium, Johannesburg

Match 12
28 January 2027
17:30 (D/N)
Scorecard

Sunrisers Eastern Cape (H)	v	Joburg Super Kings

St George's Park Cricket Ground, Gqeberha

Match 15
30 January 2027
17:30 (D/N)
Scorecard

Joburg Super Kings (H)	v	Durban's Super Giants

Wanderers Stadium, Johannesburg

Match 18
3 February 2027
17:30 (D/N)
Scorecard

Joburg Super Kings (H)	v	Paarl Royals

Wanderers Stadium, Johannesburg

Match 20
5 February 2027
17:30 (D/N)
Scorecard

Pretoria Capitals (H)	v	Joburg Super Kings

Centurion Park, Centurion

Match 23
7 February 2027
15:30 (D/N)
Scorecard

Joburg Super Kings (H)	v	Pretoria Capitals

Wanderers Stadium, Johannesburg

Match 25
10 February 2027
17:30 (D/N)
Scorecard

Joburg Super Kings (H)	v	MI Cape Town

Wanderers Stadium, Johannesburg

Match 28
13 February 2027
13:00
Scorecard

Durban's Super Giants (H)	v	Joburg Super Kings

Kingsmead Cricket Ground, Durban

== Standing ==
=== Points table ===
Pos	Team	Pld	W	L	NR	BP	Pts	NRR	Qualification
1	Durban's Super Giants	0	0	0	0	0	0	—	Advance to Qualifier 1
2	Joburg Super Kings	0	0	0	0	0	0	—	Advance to Qualifier 1
3	MI Cape Town	0	0	0	0	0	0	—	Advance to Eliminator
4	Pretoria Capitals	0	0	0	0	0	0	—	Advance to Eliminator
5	Paarl Royals	0	0	0	0	0	0	—	
6	Sunrisers Eastern Cape	0	0	0	0	0	0	—	

First match(es) will be played: 17 January 2027. Source: Cricinfo
- Points – Win 4, No Result 2. One additional point is awarded for a win when the run rate difference is 1.25 greater than the opposing side's.

=== Match summary ===
Team	League matches										Finals		
Team	1	2	3	4	5	6	7	8	9	10	QF/KO	Ch	F
Joburg Super Kings													

Win	Loss	Tie	No result

== Administration and support staff ==
JSK Staff
Position	Name
Head coach	Albie Morkel
