= 2027 MI Cape Town season =

Twenty20 cricket season in South Africa

MI Cape Town
2027 season
- Coach: Robin Peterson
- Captain(s): Rashid Khan
- Home ground: Newlands Cricket Ground
- League: SA20
- League Stage: –
- Playoffs: –

The 2027 MI Cape Town season is the fifth season of the franchise in the SA20. The team is captained by Rashid Khan and coached by Robin Peterson.

== Current squad ==
- Players with international caps are listed in **bold**.

MI Cape Town roster
Name	Nationality	Birth date	Batting Style	Bowling Style	Year signed	Notes
Batters

== League stage ==
The full fixture list was released on 23 July 2026.

**Match 4**
20 January 2027
17:30 (D/N)
Scorecard

**MI Cape Town (H)**	**v**	**Joburg Super Kings**

Newlands Cricket Ground, Cape Town

**Match 6**
22 January 2027
17:30 (D/N)
Scorecard

**MI Cape Town (H)**	**v**	**Paarl Royals**

Newlands Cricket Ground, Cape Town

**Match 9**
24 January 2027
15:30 (D/N)
Scorecard

**Paarl Royals (H)**	**v**	**MI Cape Town**

Boland Park, Paarl

**Match 14**
30 January 2027
13:00
Scorecard

**Sunrisers Eastern Cape (H)**	**v**	**MI Cape Town**

St George's Park Cricket Ground, Gqeberha

**Match 17**
2 February 2027
17:30 (D/N)
Scorecard

**MI Cape Town (H)**	**v**	**Durban's Super Giants**

Newlands Cricket Ground, Cape Town

**Match 19**
4 February 2027
17:30 (D/N)
Scorecard

**MI Cape Town (H)**	**v**	**Sunrisers Eastern Cape**

Newlands Cricket Ground, Cape Town

**Match 21**
6 February 2027
13:00
Scorecard

**Durban's Super Giants (H)**	**v**	**MI Cape Town**

Kingsmead Cricket Ground, Durban

**Match 25**
10 February 2027
17:30 (D/N)
Scorecard

**Joburg Super Kings (H)**	**v**	**MI Cape Town**

Wanderers Stadium, Johannesburg

**Match 27**
12 February 2027
17:30 (D/N)
Scorecard

**Pretoria Capitals (H)**	**v**	**MI Cape Town**

Centurion Park, Centurion

**Match 30**
14 February 2027
15:30 (D/N)
Scorecard

**MI Cape Town (H)**	**v**	**Pretoria Capitals**

Newlands Cricket Ground, Cape Town

== Standing ==
=== Points table ===
Pos	Team	Pld	W	L	NR	BP	Pts	NRR	Qualification
1	Durban's Super Giants	0	0	0	0	0	0	—	Advance to Qualifier 1
2	Joburg Super Kings	0	0	0	0	0	0	—	Advance to Qualifier 1
3	MI Cape Town	0	0	0	0	0	0	—	Advance to Eliminator
4	Pretoria Capitals	0	0	0	0	0	0	—	Advance to Eliminator
5	Paarl Royals	0	0	0	0	0	0	—	
6	Sunrisers Eastern Cape	0	0	0	0	0	0	—	

First match(es) will be played: 17 January 2027. Source: Cricinfo
- Points – Win 4, No Result 2. One additional point is awarded for a win when the run rate difference is 1.25 greater than the opposing side's.

=== Match summary ===
Team	League matches										Finals		
Team	1	2	3	4	5	6	7	8	9	10	QF/KO	Ch	F
MI Cape Town													

Win	Loss	Tie	No result

== Administration and support staff ==
Name	Role
Robin Peterson	Head coach
Hashim Amla	Batting Coach
Mitchell McClenaghan	Bowling Coach
Kruger van Wyk	Fielding Coach
