= 2027 Pretoria Capitals season =

Twenty20 cricket season in South Africa

Pretoria Capitals
2027 season
- Coach: Sourav Ganguly
- Captain(s): Keshav Maharaj
- Home ground: SuperSport Park
- League: SA20
- League Stage: –
- Playoffs: –

The 2027 Pretoria Capitals season is the fifth season of the franchise in the SA20. The team is captained by Keshav Maharaj and coached by Sourav Ganguly.

== Current squad ==
- Players with international caps are listed in **bold**.

Pretoria Capitals roster
No.	Name	Nationality	Birth date	Batting style	Bowling style	Year signed	Notes
Batters
Wicket-keepers
All-rounders
Bowlers

== League stage ==
The full fixture list was released on 23 July 2026.

**Match 1**
17 January 2027
15:30 (D/N)
Scorecard

**Sunrisers Eastern Cape (H)**	**v**	**Pretoria Capitals**

St George's Park Cricket Ground, Gqeberha

**Match 3**
19 January 2027
17:30 (D/N)
Scorecard

**Pretoria Capitals (H)**	**v**	**Durban's Super Giants**

Centurion Park, Centurion

**Match 7**
23 January 2027
13:00
Scorecard

**Durban's Super Giants (H)**	**v**	**Pretoria Capitals**

Kingsmead Cricket Ground, Durban

**Match 10**
26 January 2027
17:30 (D/N)
Scorecard

**Pretoria Capitals (H)**	**v**	**Sunrisers Eastern Cape**

Centurion Park, Centurion

**Match 13**
29 January 2027
17:30 (D/N)
Scorecard

**Paarl Royals (H)**	**v**	**Pretoria Capitals**

Boland Park, Paarl

**Match 16**
31 January 2027
15:30 (D/N)
Scorecard

**Pretoria Capitals (H)**	**v**	**Paarl Royals**

Centurion Park, Centurion

**Match 20**
5 February 2027
17:30 (D/N)
Scorecard

**Pretoria Capitals (H)**	**v**	**Joburg Super Kings**

Centurion Park, Centurion

**Match 23**
7 February 2027
15:30 (D/N)
Scorecard

**Joburg Super Kings (H)**	**v**	**Pretoria Capitals**

Wanderers Stadium, Johannesburg

**Match 27**
12 February 2027
17:30 (D/N)
Scorecard

**Pretoria Capitals (H)**	**v**	**MI Cape Town**

Centurion Park, Centurion

**Match 30**
14 February 2027
15:30 (D/N)
Scorecard

**MI Cape Town (H)**	**v**	**Pretoria Capitals**

Newlands Cricket Ground, Cape Town

== Standing ==
=== Points table ===
Pos	Team	Pld	W	L	NR	BP	Pts	NRR	Qualification
1	Durban's Super Giants	0	0	0	0	0	0	—	Advance to Qualifier 1
2	Joburg Super Kings	0	0	0	0	0	0	—	Advance to Qualifier 1
3	MI Cape Town	0	0	0	0	0	0	—	Advance to Eliminator
4	Pretoria Capitals	0	0	0	0	0	0	—	Advance to Eliminator
5	Paarl Royals	0	0	0	0	0	0	—	
6	Sunrisers Eastern Cape	0	0	0	0	0	0	—	

First match(es) will be played: 17 January 2027. Source: Cricinfo
- Points – Win 4, No Result 2. One additional point is awarded for a win when the run rate difference is 1.25 greater than the opposing side's.

=== Match summary ===
Team	League matches										Finals		
Team	1	2	3	4	5	6	7	8	9	10	QF/KO	Ch	F
Pretoria Capitals													

Win	Loss	Tie	No result
