= 2027 Paarl Royals season =

Paarl Royals season

Paarl Royals
2027 season
- Coach: Trevor Penney
- Captain(s): David Miller
- Home ground: Boland Park
- League: SA20
- League Stage: –
- Playoffs: –

The 2027 Paarl Royals season is the fifth season of the franchise in the SA20. The team is captained by David Miller and coached by Trevor Penney.

== Current squads ==
- Players with international caps are listed in **bold**.

Paarl Royals roster
No.	Name	Nat.	Birth date	Batting style	Bowling style	Year signed	Notes
Batters
1	**David Miller**	South Africa	10 June 1989	Left-handed	Right-arm off break	2023	Captain
66	**Joe Root**	England	30 December 1990	Right-handed	Right-arm off break	2027	Wildcard; returned to Paarl Royals
3	**Asa Tribe**	Jersey	29 March 2004	Right-handed	Right-arm off break	2026	
Wicket-keepers
4	**Rubin Hermann**	South Africa	26 January 1997	Left-handed	—	2025	
5	Keagan Lion-Cachet	South Africa	19 March 2002	Right-handed	—	2026	
6	**Kyle Verreynne**	South Africa	12 May 1997	Right-handed	—	2026	
7	**Lhuan-dre Pretorius**	South Africa	27 March 2006	Left-handed	—	2025	U23
8	Thomas Rew	England	29 November 2007	Right-handed	—	2027	
All-rounders
9	**Dan Lawrence**	England	12 July 1997	Right-handed	Right-arm off break	2026	
10	**Azmatullah Omarzai**	Afghanistan	24 March 2000	Right-handed	Right-arm medium	2027	
11	**Sikandar Raza**	Zimbabwe	24 April 1986	Right-handed	Right-arm off break	2026	
12	Delano Potgieter	South Africa	5 August 1996	Left-handed	Right-arm medium	2026	
13	JJ Basson	South Africa	7 April 2008	Left-handed	Left-arm medium	2026	U23
Bowlers
14	**Ottniel Baartman**	South Africa	18 March 1993	Right-handed	Right-arm fast	2026	
15	**Bjorn Fortuin**	South Africa	21 October 1994	Right-handed	Slow left-arm orthodox	2023	
16	**Gudakesh Motie**	West Indies	29 March 1995	Left-handed	Slow left-arm orthodox	2026	
17	**Mujeeb Ur Rahman**	Afghanistan	28 March 2001	Right-handed	Right-arm off break	2025	
18	**Nqobani Mokoena**	South Africa	5 May 2006	Right-handed	Right-arm fast-medium	2025	U23
19	**Hardus Viljoen**	South Africa	6 March 1989	Right-handed	Right-arm fast	2026	

== League stage ==
The full fixture list was released on 23 July 2026.

Match 2
18 January 2027
17:30 (D/N)
Scorecard

Paarl Royals (H)	v	Joburg Super Kings

Boland Park, Paarl

Match 6
22 January 2027
17:30 (D/N)
Scorecard

MI Cape Town (H)	v	Paarl Royals

Newlands Cricket Ground, Cape Town

Match 9
24 January 2027
15:30 (D/N)
Scorecard

Paarl Royals (H)	v	MI Cape Town

Boland Park, Paarl

Match 11
27 January 2027
17:30 (D/N)
Scorecard

Durban's Super Giants (H)	v	Paarl Royals

Kingsmead Cricket Ground, Durban

Match 13
29 January 2027
17:30 (D/N)
Scorecard

Paarl Royals (H)	v	Pretoria Capitals

Boland Park, Paarl

Match 16
31 January 2027
15:30 (D/N)
Scorecard

Pretoria Capitals (H)	v	Paarl Royals

Centurion Park, Centurion

Match 18
3 February 2027
17:30 (D/N)
Scorecard

Joburg Super Kings (H)	v	Paarl Royals

Wanderers Stadium, Johannesburg

Match 22
6 February 2027
17:30 (D/N)
Scorecard

Paarl Royals (H)	v	Sunrisers Eastern Cape

Boland Park, Paarl

Match 26
11 February 2027
17:30 (D/N)
Scorecard

Paarl Royals (H)	v	Durban's Super Giants

Boland Park, Paarl

Match 29
13 February 2027
17:30 (D/N)
Scorecard

Sunrisers Eastern Cape (H)	v	Paarl Royals

St George's Park Cricket Ground, Gqeberha

== Standing ==
=== Points table ===
Pos	Team	Pld	W	L	NR	BP	Pts	NRR	Qualification
1	Durban's Super Giants	0	0	0	0	0	0	—	Advance to Qualifier 1
2	Joburg Super Kings	0	0	0	0	0	0	—	Advance to Qualifier 1
3	MI Cape Town	0	0	0	0	0	0	—	Advance to Eliminator
4	Pretoria Capitals	0	0	0	0	0	0	—	Advance to Eliminator
5	Paarl Royals	0	0	0	0	0	0	—	
6	Sunrisers Eastern Cape	0	0	0	0	0	0	—	

First match(es) will be played: 17 January 2027. Source: Cricinfo
- Points – Win 4, No Result 2. One additional point is awarded for a win when the run rate difference is 1.25 greater than the opposing side's.

=== Match summary ===
Team	League matches										Finals		
Team	1	2	3	4	5	6	7	8	9	10	QF/KO	Ch	F
Paarl Royals													

Win	Loss	Tie	No result
