= 2027 SA20 =

Twenty20 cricket season in South Africa

2027 SA20 season
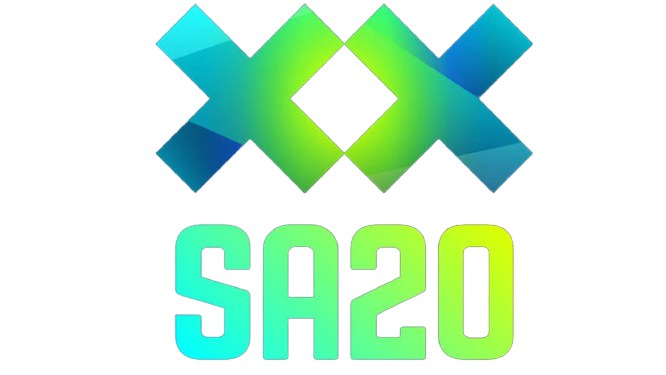
- Dates: 17 January 2027 – 21 February 2027
- Administrator: Cricket South Africa
- Cricket format: Twenty20
- Tournament format(s): Double round-robin and Playoffs
- Host: South Africa
- Participants: 6
- Matches: 34
- Official website: sa20.co.za

The 2027 SA20 season (also known as Betway SA20 2027 for sponsorship reasons) will be the fifth season of the SA20, a franchise Twenty20 cricket league in South Africa. The competition, organised by Cricket South Africa, featured six teams. The tournament is set to take place from 17 January to 21 February 2027, with the final to be held in Cape Town. Sunrisers Eastern Cape entered the tournament as the defending champions.

== Background ==
On 23 July 2026, Cricket South Africa announced the fixtures for the fifth season of the tournament. The competition was scheduled to be held from 17 January to 21 February 2027, with defending champions Sunrisers Eastern Cape facing Pretoria Capitals in the opening match at St George's Park, Gqeberha. The final was scheduled to take place at Newlands Cricket Ground in Cape Town.

On 5 August 2026, six franchises announced their retained and pre-signed players before the player auction, which was held on 7 October 2026. Four franchises entered the auction with a combined 19 playing positions available, including a wildcard slot for Joburg Super Kings that was exempt from the salary cap. Durban's Super Giants and Paarl Royals completed their full 19-player squads before the auction and therefore did not require any further signings.

A total of 789 players registered for the auction, with 156 shortlisted for the auction, with the shortlist comprises 95 South African players and 61 overseas players.

In the auction, Joburg Super Kings made six signings, including Faf du Plessis, Kieron Pollard and 18-year-old all-rounder Jason Rowles for R2.9 million. MI Cape Town also made six signings, including Wiaan Mulder for R2.6 million, Shimron Hetmyer and Trent Boult, who returned to the franchise. Pretoria Capitals signed five players, including Rassie van der Dussen and Temba Bavuma, while defending champions Sunrisers Eastern Cape completed their squad with Nandre Burger and Craig Overton.

== Teams ==
Team	Home ground(s)	Captain	Head coach
Durban's Super Giants	Kingsmead Cricket Ground	Aiden Markram	Lance Klusener
Joburg Super Kings	Wanderers Stadium		Albie Morkel
MI Cape Town	Newlands Cricket Ground	Rashid Khan	Robin Peterson
Paarl Royals	Boland Park	David Miller	Trevor Penney
Pretoria Capitals	Centurion Park	Keshav Maharaj	Sourav Ganguly
Sunrisers Eastern Cape	St George's Park Cricket Ground	Tristan Stubbs	Adrian Birrell

=== Personnel changes ===
==== Coaching changes ====
Following Stephen Fleming's departure from the Joburg Super Kings Albie Morkel was named as the coach of the team in August.

==== Captaincy changes ====
Faf du Plessis was not retained for the 2027 season stepping down as the captain of the Joburg Super Kings.

== Squads ==
The player auction is set to take place on 7 October 2026.

Durban's Super Giants	Joburg Super Kings	MI Cape Town	Paarl Royals	Pretoria Capitals	Sunrisers Eastern Cape
Aiden Markram; Henrich Klaasen; (England) Jos Buttler; (New Zealand) Kane Williamson; (England) Sam Curran; (Cricket West Indies) Sunil Narine; Gerald Coetzee; (England) Liam Livingstone; Evan Jones; (New Zealand) Devon Conway; Simon Harmer; Marques Ackerman; Eathan Bosch; Tony de Zorzi; David Bedingham; Daryn Dupavillon; Kwena Maphaka; Andile Simelane; Kyle Simmonds	Faf du Plessis; Donovan Ferreira; Dian Forrester; (United States) Andries Gous; (Cricket West Indies) Jason Holder; Duan Jansen; (England) Jamie Overton; (England) Leus Du Plooy; Rilee Rossouw; Prenelan Subrayen; Jarren Bacher; Janco Smit; Matthew de Villiers; (Cricket West Indies) Akeal Hosein; (England) James Vince; Jason Rowles; Dayyaan Galiem; (Zimbabwe) Blessing Muzarabani; (England) Aneurin Donald	(Afghanistan) Rashid Khan; George Linde; (Cricket West Indies) Nicholas Pooran; Kagiso Rabada; Reeza Hendricks; (England) Will Jacks; Corbin Bosch; Ryan Rickelton; Dane Piedt; Jason Smith; Tristan Luus; Tiaan van Vuuren; Thomas Kaber; (Cricket West Indies) Shimron Hetmyer; (New Zealand) Trent Boult; Wiaan Mulder; Daniel Smith; Lehan Botha; Oliver Whitehead	David Miller; (England) Joe Root; (England) Dan Lawrence; Delano Potgieter; (Jersey) Asa Tribe; Rubin Hermann; Kyle Verreyenne; Lhuan-dre Pretorius; Keagan Lion-Cachet; (England) Thomas Rew; (Zimbabwe) Sikandar Raza; (Afghanistan) Azmatullah Omarzai; Ottniel Baartman; Bjorn Fortuin; Hardus Viljoen; (Cricket West Indies) Gudakesh Motie; (Afghanistan) Mujeeb Ur Rahman; Nqobani Mokoena; J. J. Basson	Keshav Maharaj; Dewald Brevis; (England) Phil Salt; Temba Bavuma; Rassie van der Dussen; (Cricket West Indies) Sherfane Rutherford; (Cricket West Indies) Andre Russell; Connor Esterhuizen; (Australia) Matthew Short; Bryce Parsons; (Cricket West Indies) Ackeem Auguste; (Cricket West Indies) Keemo Paul; Lizaad Williams; Lungi Ngidi; Gideon Peters; Codi Yusuf; Josh Breed; Wihan Lubbe; Bayanda Majola	Tristan Stubbs; Quinton de Kock; (Australia) Mitchell Marsh; Marco Jansen; Matthew Breetzke; Jordan Hermann; Anrich Nortje; Nandre Burger; (New Zealand) Adam Milne; (Bangladesh) Rishad Hossain; Senuran Muthusamy; Lutho Sipamla; (England) James Coles; (England) Craig Overton; Patrick Kruger; Mitchell van Buuren; (England) Lewis Gregory; JP King; CJ King

== Venues ==
Cape Town	Centurion	Durban
Newlands Cricket Ground	Centurion Park	Kingsmead Cricket Ground
Capacity: 25,000	Capacity: 22,000	Capacity: 25,000
2027 SA20 (South Africa)
Gqeberha	Johannesburg	Paarl
St George's Park Cricket Ground	Wanderers Stadium	Boland Park
Capacity: 19,000	Capacity: 34,000	Capacity: 10,000

== Standings ==
=== Points table ===
Pos	Team	Pld	W	L	NR	BP	Pts	NRR	Qualification
1	Durban's Super Giants	0	0	0	0	0	0	—	Advance to Qualifier 1
2	Joburg Super Kings	0	0	0	0	0	0	—	Advance to Qualifier 1
3	MI Cape Town	0	0	0	0	0	0	—	Advance to Eliminator
4	Pretoria Capitals	0	0	0	0	0	0	—	Advance to Eliminator
5	Paarl Royals	0	0	0	0	0	0	—	
6	Sunrisers Eastern Cape	0	0	0	0	0	0	—	

First match(es) will be played: 17 January 2027. Source: Cricinfo
- Points – Win 4, No Result 2. One additional point is awarded for a win when the run rate difference is 1.25 greater than the opposing side's.

=== Match summary ===
Team	Group matches										Playoffs		
Team	1	2	3	4	5	6	7	8	9	10	Q1/E	Q2	F
Durban's Super Giants	?	?	?	?	?	?	?	?	?	?			
Joburg Super Kings	?	?	?	?	?	?	?	?	?	?			
MI Cape Town	?	?	?	?	?	?	?	?	?	?			
Paarl Royals	?	?	?	?	?	?	?	?	?	?			
Pretoria Capitals	?	?	?	?	?	?	?	?	?	?			
Sunrisers Eastern Cape	?	?	?	?	?	?	?	?	?	?			

Win	Loss	No result

- Note: The total points at the end of each group match are listed.
- Note: Click on the points (group matches) or W/L (playoffs) to see the match summary.

Visitor team →	DSG	JSK	MICT	PR	PC	SEC
Home team ↓	DSG	JSK	MICT	PR	PC	SEC
Durban's Super Giants		Match 28	Match 21	Match 11	Match 7	Match 5
Joburg Super Kings	Match 15		Match 25	Match 18	Match 23	Match 8
MI Cape Town	Match 17	Match 4		Match 6	Match 30	Match 19
Paarl Royals	Match 26	Match 2	Match 9		Match 13	Match 22
Pretoria Capitals	Match 3	Match 20	Match 27	Match 16		Match 10
Sunrisers Eastern Cape	Match 24	Match 12	Match 14	Match 29	Match 1	

- Note: Results listed are according to the home (horizontal) and visitor (vertical) teams.
- Note: Click on a result to see a summary of the match.

== League stage ==
The full fixture list was released on 23 July 2026.

Match 1
17 January 2027
15:30 (D/N)
Scorecard

Sunrisers Eastern Cape (H)	v	Pretoria Capitals

St George's Park Cricket Ground, Gqeberha

Match 2
18 January 2027
17:30 (D/N)
Scorecard

Paarl Royals (H)	v	Joburg Super Kings

Boland Park, Paarl

Match 3
19 January 2027
17:30 (D/N)
Scorecard

Pretoria Capitals (H)	v	Durban's Super Giants

Centurion Park, Centurion

Match 4
20 January 2027
17:30 (D/N)
Scorecard

MI Cape Town (H)	v	Joburg Super Kings

Newlands Cricket Ground, Cape Town

Match 5
21 January 2027
17:30 (D/N)
Scorecard

Durban's Super Giants (H)	v	Sunrisers Eastern Cape

Kingsmead Cricket Ground, Durban

Match 6
22 January 2027
17:30 (D/N)
Scorecard

MI Cape Town (H)	v	Paarl Royals

Newlands Cricket Ground, Cape Town

Match 7
23 January 2027
13:00
Scorecard

Durban's Super Giants (H)	v	Pretoria Capitals

Kingsmead Cricket Ground, Durban

Match 8
23 January 2027
17:30 (D/N)
Scorecard

Joburg Super Kings (H)	v	Sunrisers Eastern Cape

Wanderers Stadium, Johannesburg

Match 9
24 January 2027
15:30 (D/N)
Scorecard

Paarl Royals (H)	v	MI Cape Town

Boland Park, Paarl

Match 10
26 January 2027
17:30 (D/N)
Scorecard

Pretoria Capitals (H)	v	Sunrisers Eastern Cape

Centurion Park, Centurion

Match 11
27 January 2027
17:30 (D/N)
Scorecard

Durban's Super Giants (H)	v	Paarl Royals

Kingsmead Cricket Ground, Durban

Match 12
28 January 2027
17:30 (D/N)
Scorecard

Sunrisers Eastern Cape (H)	v	Joburg Super Kings

St George's Park Cricket Ground, Gqeberha

Match 13
29 January 2027
17:30 (D/N)
Scorecard

Paarl Royals (H)	v	Pretoria Capitals

Boland Park, Paarl

Match 14
30 January 2027
13:00
Scorecard

Sunrisers Eastern Cape (H)	v	MI Cape Town

St George's Park Cricket Ground, Gqeberha

Match 15
30 January 2027
17:30 (D/N)
Scorecard

Joburg Super Kings (H)	v	Durban's Super Giants

Wanderers Stadium, Johannesburg

Match 16
31 January 2027
15:30 (D/N)
Scorecard

Pretoria Capitals (H)	v	Paarl Royals

Centurion Park, Centurion

Match 17
2 February 2027
17:30 (D/N)
Scorecard

MI Cape Town (H)	v	Durban's Super Giants

Newlands Cricket Ground, Cape Town

Match 18
3 February 2027
17:30 (D/N)
Scorecard

Joburg Super Kings (H)	v	Paarl Royals

Wanderers Stadium, Johannesburg

Match 19
4 February 2027
17:30 (D/N)
Scorecard

MI Cape Town (H)	v	Sunrisers Eastern Cape

Newlands Cricket Ground, Cape Town

Match 20
5 February 2027
17:30 (D/N)
Scorecard

Pretoria Capitals (H)	v	Joburg Super Kings

Centurion Park, Centurion

Match 21
6 February 2027
13:00
Scorecard

Durban's Super Giants (H)	v	MI Cape Town

Kingsmead Cricket Ground, Durban

Match 22
6 February 2027
17:30 (D/N)
Scorecard

Paarl Royals (H)	v	Sunrisers Eastern Cape

Boland Park, Paarl

Match 23
7 February 2027
15:30 (D/N)
Scorecard

Joburg Super Kings (H)	v	Pretoria Capitals

Wanderers Stadium, Johannesburg

Match 24
9 February 2027
17:30 (D/N)
Scorecard

Sunrisers Eastern Cape (H)	v	Durban's Super Giants

St George's Park Cricket Ground, Gqeberha

Match 25
10 February 2027
17:30 (D/N)
Scorecard

Joburg Super Kings (H)	v	MI Cape Town

Wanderers Stadium, Johannesburg

Match 26
11 February 2027
17:30 (D/N)
Scorecard

Paarl Royals (H)	v	Durban's Super Giants

Boland Park, Paarl

Match 27
12 February 2027
17:30 (D/N)
Scorecard

Pretoria Capitals (H)	v	MI Cape Town

Centurion Park, Centurion

Match 28
13 February 2027
13:00
Scorecard

Durban's Super Giants (H)	v	Joburg Super Kings

Kingsmead Cricket Ground, Durban

Match 29
13 February 2027
17:30 (D/N)
Scorecard

Sunrisers Eastern Cape (H)	v	Paarl Royals

St George's Park Cricket Ground, Gqeberha

Match 30
14 February 2027
15:30 (D/N)
Scorecard

MI Cape Town (H)	v	Pretoria Capitals

Newlands Cricket Ground, Cape Town

== Playoffs ==
=== Bracket ===
Qualifier 1
16 February 2027 - Paarl
1	1st placed team
2	2nd placed team
Eliminator
17 February 2027 - Johannesburg
3	3rd placed team
4	4th placed team

Qualifier 2
19 February 2027 - Johannesburg
Q1L	Loser of Qualifier 1
EW	Winner of Eliminator

Final
21 February 2027 - Cape Town
Q1W	Winner of Qualifier 1
Q2W	Winner of Qualifier 2

=== Qualifier 1 ===
Qualifier 1
16 February 2027
17:30 (D/N)
Scorecard

1st placed team	v	2nd placed team

Boland Park, Paarl

=== Eliminator ===
Eliminator
17 February 2027
17:30 (D/N)
Scorecard

3rd placed team	v	4th placed team

Wanderers Stadium, Johannesburg

=== Qualifier 2 ===
Qualifier 2
19 February 2027
17:30 (D/N)
Scorecard

Loser of Qualifier 1	v	Winner of Eliminator

Wanderers Stadium, Johannesburg

=== Final ===
Final
21 February 2027
15:30 (D/N)
Scorecard

Winner of Qualifier 1	v	Winner of Qualifier 2

Newlands Cricket Ground, Cape Town
