= 2023 SA20 =

Inaugural season of the South African T20 League

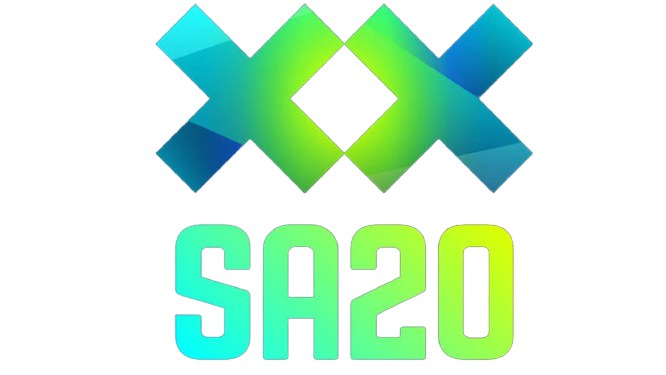
- Dates: 10 January – 12 February 2023
- Administrator: Cricket South Africa
- Cricket format: Twenty20
- Tournament format(s): Double round-robin and playoffs
- Champions: Sunrisers Eastern Cape (1st title)
- Runners-up: Pretoria Capitals
- Participants: 6
- Matches: 33
- Player of the series: Aiden Markram (Sunrisers Eastern Cape)
- Most runs: Jos Buttler (Paarl Royals) (391)
- Most wickets: Roelof van der Merwe (Sunrisers Eastern Cape) (20); Anrich Nortje (Pretoria Capitals) (20)
- Official website: sa20.co.za

The 2023 SA20 or SA20 Season 1 (also known as Betway SA20 2023 for sponsorship reasons) was the inaugural season of the SA20, a franchise Twenty20 cricket league in South Africa, organised by Cricket South Africa (CSA). The tournament was played from 10 January to 12 February 2023. SuperSport, Sky Sports and the Sports18 network broadcast the tournament in South Africa, the United Kingdom and India respectively.

In the final, Sunrisers Eastern Cape defeated Pretoria Capitals by four wickets to win the inaugural title.

== Squads ==
The player auction took place on 19 September 2022.

Durban's Super Giants Coach: Lance Klusener	Joburg Super Kings Coach: Stephen Fleming	MI Cape Town Coach: Simon Katich	Paarl Royals Coach: JP Duminy	Pretoria Capitals Coach: Graham Ford	Sunrisers Eastern Cape Coach: Adrian Birrell
Quinton de Kock (c); Jason Holder (WI); Kyle Mayers (WI); Reece Topley (ENG); Prenelan Subrayen; Dwaine Pretorius; Heinrich Klaasen; Keemo Paul (WI); Keshav Maharaj; Kyle Abbott; Junior Dala; Dilshan Madushanka (SL); Johnson Charles (WI); Matthew Breetzke; Christiaan Jonker; Simon Harmer; Wiaan Mulder; Hardus Viljoen; Akila Dananjaya (SL); Ben McDermott (AUS); David Willey (ENG)	Faf du Plessis (c); Moeen Ali (ENG); Maheesh Theekshana (SL); Romario Shepherd (WI); Gerald Coetzee; Harry Brook (ENG); Janneman Malan; Reeza Hendricks; Kyle Verreynne; George Garton (ENG); Alzarri Joseph (WI); Leus du Plooy (ENG); Lewis Gregory (ENG); Lizaad Williams; Nandre Burger; Donovan Ferreira; Malusi Siboto; Caleb Seleka; Aaron Phangiso; Neil Brand (ENG); Sibonelo Makhanya; Matthew Wade (AUS); Kyle Simmonds (WI)	Rashid Khan (c) (AFG); Kagiso Rabada; Dewald Brevis; Sam Curran (ENG); Liam Livingstone (ENG); Rassie van der Dussen; Ryan Rickelton; George Linde; Beuran Hendricks; Duan Jansen; Delano Potgieter; Odean Smith (WI); Ziyaad Abrahams; Wesley Marshall; Olly Stone (ENG); Waqar Salamkheil (AFG); Grant Roelofsen; Jofra Archer (ENG); Tim David (SGP)	David Miller (c); Jos Buttler (ENG); Obed McCoy (WI); Corbin Bosch; Lungi Ngidi; Tabraiz Shamsi; Jason Roy (ENG); Dane Vilas (ENG); Bjorn Fortuin; Mitchell van Buuren; Wihan Lubbe; Ferisco Adams; Imran Manack; Evan Jones (ENG); Ramon Simmonds (WI); Eoin Morgan (ENG); Codi Yusuf; Andile Phehlukwayo	Wayne Parnell (c); Anrich Nortje; Migael Pretorius; Rilee Rossouw; Phil Salt (ENG); Josh Little (IRE); Shaun von Berg; Adil Rashid (ENG); Cameron Delport (SA); Will Jacks (ENG); Theunis de Bruyn; Marco Marais; James Neesham (NZ); Kusal Mendis (SL); Daryn Dupavillon; Shane Dadswell; Eathan Bosch; Senuran Muthusamy; Colin Ingram (SA)	Aiden Markram (c); Ottniel Baartman; Marco Jansen; Tristan Stubbs; Sisanda Magala; Junaid Dawood; Mason Crane (ENG); JJ Smuts; Jordan Cox (ENG); Adam Rossington (ENG); Roelof van der Merwe (NED); Marques Ackerman; James Fuller (ENG); Brydon Carse (ENG); Sarel Erwee; Ayabulela Gqamane; Tom Abell (ENG); Jordan Hermann; Temba Bavuma

== Venues ==
Cape Town	Centurion	Durban
MI Cape Town	Pretoria Capitals	Durban's Super Giants
Newlands Cricket Ground	Centurion Park	Kingsmead Cricket Ground
Capacity: 25,000	Capacity: 22,000	Capacity: 25,000
2023 SA20 (South Africa)
Gqeberha	Johannesburg	Paarl
Sunrisers Eastern Cape	Joburg Super Kings	Paarl Royals
St George's Park Cricket Ground	Wanderers Stadium	Boland Park
Capacity: 19,000	Capacity: 34,000	Capacity: 10,000

== Teams and standings ==
=== Points table ===
Pos	Team	Pld	W	L	NR	BP	Pts	NRR	Qualification
1	Pretoria Capitals (R)	10	7	3	0	4	32	0.927	Advanced to the semi-finals
2	Joburg Super Kings	10	6	3	1	1	27	−0.111	Advanced to the semi-finals
3	Sunrisers Eastern Cape (C)	10	4	5	1	1	19	0.316	Advanced to the semi-finals
4	Paarl Royals	10	4	5	1	1	19	−0.293	Advanced to the semi-finals
5	Durban's Super Giants	10	4	5	1	1	19	−0.319	
6	MI Cape Town	10	3	7	0	1	13	−0.500	

Source: ESPNCricinfo
(C) Champions; (R) Runners-up
- Points – Win 4, No Result 2. One additional point is awarded for a win when the run rate difference is 1.25 greater than the opposing side's.

=== Match summary ===
Visitor team →	DSG	JSK	MICT	PR	PC	SEC
Home team ↓	DSG	JSK	MICT	PR	PC	SEC
Durban's Super Giants		Johannesburg; 16 runs	Durban; 5 wickets	Durban; 27 runs	Pretoria; 8 wickets	Match abandoned
Joburg Super Kings	Johannesburg; 8 wickets		Johannesburg; 76 runs	Match abandoned	Johannesburg; 6 runs	Johannesburg; 24 runs
MI Cape Town	Durban; 5 wickets	Cape Town; 7 wickets		Cape Town; 8 wickets	Pretoria; 52 runs	Eastern Cape; 2 wickets
Paarl Royals	Paarl; 10 runs	Paarl; 7 wickets	Cape Town; 13 runs		Paarl; 6 wickets	Eastern Cape; 5 wickets
Pretoria Capitals	Durban; 151 runs	Pretoria; 6 wickets	Pretoria; 1 wicket	Pretoria; 59 runs		Pretoria; 37 runs
Sunrisers Eastern Cape	Eastern Cape; 124 runs	Johannesburg; 5 wickets	Eastern Cape; 4 wickets	Paarl; 5 wickets	Pretoria; 23 runs	

Home team won	Visitor team won

- Note: Results listed are according to the home (horizontal) and visitor (vertical) teams.
- Note: Click on a result to see a summary of the match.

== League stage ==
The full fixture list was released on 7 November 2022.

Match 1
10 January 2023
17:30 (D/N)
Scorecard

Paarl Royals; 142/7 (20 overs)	v	MI Cape Town (H); 143/2 (15.3 overs)
Jos Buttler 51 (42); Jofra Archer 3/27 (4 overs)		Dewald Brevis 70* (41); Ramon Simmonds 1/32 (3 overs)

MI Cape Town won by 8 wickets
Newlands Cricket Ground, Cape Town
Attendance: 11,115
Umpires: Allahudien Paleker and Marais Erasmus
Player of the match: Dewald Brevis (MI Cape Town)

- MI Cape Town won the toss and elected to field.
- MI Cape Town were awarded a bonus point for a win with a run rate difference greater than 1.25.

Match 2
11 January 2023
17:30 (D/N)
Scorecard

Joburg Super Kings; 190/6 (20 overs)	v	Durban's Super Giants (H); 174/5 (20 overs)
Donavon Ferreira 82* (40); Prenelan Subrayen 2/26 (3 overs)		Quinton de Kock 78 (52); Alzarri Joseph 2/30 (4 overs)

Joburg Super Kings won by 16 runs
Kingsmead Cricket Ground, Durban
Attendance: 13,124
Umpires: Lubabalo Gcuma and Adrian Holdstock
Player of the match: Donavon Ferreira (Joburg Super Kings)

- Joburg Super Kings won the toss and elected to bat.

Match 3
12 January 2023
17:30 (D/N)
Scorecard

Pretoria Capitals; 193/6 (20 overs)	v	Sunrisers Eastern Cape (H); 170/5 (20 overs)
Phil Salt 77* (47); Aiden Markram 2/17 (2 overs)		JJ Smuts 66 (51); Anrich Nortje 2/18 (4 overs)

Pretoria Capitals won by 23 runs
St George's Park Cricket Ground, Gqeberha
Umpires: Stephen Harris and Bongani Jele
Player of the match: Phil Salt (Pretoria Capitals)

- Sunrisers Eastern Cape won the toss and elected to field.

Match 4
13 January 2023
13:30
Scorecard

Joburg Super Kings; 81 (17.2 overs)	v	Paarl Royals (H); 82/3 (10.3 overs)
Lizaad Williams 17* (18); Bjorn Fortuin 3/16 (4 overs)		Jos Buttler 29* (21); George Garton 1/15 (2 overs)

Paarl Royals won by 7 wickets
Boland Park, Paarl
Umpires: Lubabalo Gcuma and Dennis Smith
Player of the match: Bjorn Fortuin (Paarl Royals)

- Joburg Super Kings won the toss and elected to bat.
- Paarl Royals were awarded a bonus point for a win with a run rate difference greater than 1.25.

Match 5
13 January 2023
17:30 (D/N)
Scorecard

(H) MI Cape Town; 152/8 (20 overs)	v	Durban's Super Giants; 154/5 (16.3 overs)
Grant Roelofsen 52 (44); Reece Topley 2/27 (3 overs)		Heinrich Klaasen 36 (22); Olly Stone 4/28 (3.3 overs)

Durban's Super Giants won by 5 wickets
Newlands Cricket Ground, Cape Town
Umpires: Shaun George and Brad White
Player of the match: Kyle Mayers (Durban's Super Giants)

- Durban's Super Giants won the toss and elected to field.

Match 6
14 January 2023
13:30
Scorecard

(H) Pretoria Capitals; 216/6 (20 overs)	v	Sunrisers Eastern Cape; 179/7 (20 overs)
Will Jacks 92 (46); Sisanda Magala 2/28 (4 overs)		Aiden Markram 46 (29); Wayne Parnell 2/20 (3 overs)

Pretoria Capitals won by 37 runs
Centurion Park, Centurion
Attendance: 10,992
Umpires: Allahudien Paleker and Arno Jacobs
Player of the match: Will Jacks (Pretoria Capitals)

- Sunrisers Eastern Cape won the toss and elected to field.

Match 7
14 January 2023
17:30 (D/N)
Scorecard

Joburg Super Kings; 105/9 (20 overs)	v	MI Cape Town (H); 107/3 (16.2 overs)
Leus du Plooy 21 (26); Kagiso Rabada 2/12 (4 overs)		Dewald Brevis 42 (34); Gerald Coetzee 2/24 (4 overs)

MI Cape Town won by 7 wickets
Newlands Cricket Ground, Cape Town
Umpires: Adrian Holdstock and Marais Erasmus
Player of the match: Kagiso Rabada (MI Cape Town)

- MI Cape Town won the toss and elected to field.

Match 8
15 January 2023
13:30
Scorecard

(H) Durban's Super Giants; 216/4 (20 overs)	v	Paarl Royals; 189/8 (20 overs)
Quinton de Kock 57 (31); Lungi Ngidi 2/33 (4 overs)		Eoin Morgan 64 (37); Reece Topley 3/34 (4 overs)

Durban Super Giants won by 27 runs
Kingsmead Cricket Ground, Durban
Umpires: Siphelele Gasa and Abdoellah Steenkamp
Player of the match: Heinrich Klaasen (Durban Super Giants)

- Durban Super Giants won the toss and elected to bat.

Match 9
16 January 2023
17:30 (D/N)
Scorecard

MI Cape Town; 158/8 (20 overs)	v	Sunrisers Eastern Cape (H); 162/6 (19.3 overs)
George Linde 63* (28); Ottniel Baartman 3/45 (4 overs)		Aiden Markram 50 (35); Odean Smith 3/23 (2.3 overs)

Sunrisers Eastern Cape won by 4 wickets
St George's Park Cricket Ground, Gqeberha
Umpires: Stephen Harris and Allahudien Paleker
Player of the match: Aiden Markram (Sunrisers Eastern Cape)

- Sunrisers Eastern Cape won the toss and elected to field.

Match 10
17 January 2023
13:30
Scorecard

(H) Paarl Royals; 169/6 (20 overs)	v	Durban's Super Giants; 159/8 (20 overs)
Wihan Lubbe 57 (36); Dwaine Pretorius 2/35 (4 overs)		Heinrich Klaasen 56* (39); Evan Jones 4/32 (4 overs)

Paarl Royals won by 10 runs
Boland Park, Paarl
Umpires: Adrian Holdstock and Brad White
Player of the match: Bjorn Fortuin (Paarl Royals)

- Durban Super Giants won the toss and elected to field.

Match 11
17 January 2023
17:30 (D/N)
Scorecard

(H) Joburg Super Kings; 168/6 (20 overs)	v	Pretoria Capitals; 162 (20 overs)
Leus Du Plooy 75* (40); Eathan Bosch 3/12 (3 overs)		Phil Salt 29 (15); Aaron Phangiso 4/32 (4 overs)

Joburg Super Kings won by 6 runs
Wanderers Stadium, Johannesburg
Umpires: Marais Erasmus and Shaun George
Player of the match: Leus Du Plooy (Joburg Super Kings)

- Pretoria Capitals won the toss and elected to field.

Match 12
18 January 2023
13:30
Scorecard

(H) MI Cape Town; 171/6 (20 overs)	v	Sunrisers Eastern Cape; 172/8 (19.3 overs)
Grant Roelofsen 56 (36); Roelof van der Merwe 2/21 (4 overs)		Marco Jansen 66 (27); Kagiso Rabada 3/34 (4 overs)

Sunrisers Eastern Cape won by 2 wickets
Newlands Cricket Ground, Cape Town
Umpires: Arno Jacobs and Bongani Jele
Player of the match: Marco Jansen (Sunrisers Eastern Cape)

- Sunrisers Eastern Cape won the toss and elected to field.

Match 13
18 January 2023
17:30 (D/N)
Scorecard

Joburg Super Kings; 122 (15.4 overs)	v	Pretoria Capitals (H); 123/4 (13 overs)
Faf du Plessis 51 (22); James Neesham 3/7 (3 overs)		Phil Salt 52* (30); Lewis Gregory 1/12 (2 overs)

Pretoria Capitals won by 6 wickets
Centurion Park, Centurion
Umpires: Marais Erasmus and Dennis Smith
Player of the match: James Neesham (Pretoria Capitals)

- Pretoria Capitals won the toss and elected to field.
- Pretoria Capitals were awarded a bonus point for a win with a run rate difference greater than 1.25.

Match 14
19 January 2023
17:30 (D/N)
Scorecard

(H) Paarl Royals; 127/7 (20 overs)	v	Sunrisers Eastern Cape; 131/5 (18.2 overs)
Wihan Lubbe 28 (21); Aiden Markram 2/21 (4 overs); Roelof van der Merwe 2/21 (4 overs)		Jordan Hermann 43 (39); Bjorn Fortuin 3/20 (4 overs)

Sunrisers Eastern Cape won by 5 wickets
Boland Park, Paarl
Umpires: Abdoellah Steenkamp and Brad White
Player of the match: Aiden Markram (Sunrisers Eastern Cape)

- Sunrisers Eastern Cape won the toss and elected to field.

Match 15
20 January 2023
17:30 (D/N)
Scorecard

(H) Durban's Super Giants; 80 (18.1 overs)	v	Pretoria Capitals; 84/2 (7.3 overs)
Heinrich Klaasen 31 (24); Senuran Muthusamy 3/12 (4 overs)		Will Jacks 56 (25); Kyle Mayers 1/12 (2 overs)

Pretoria Capitals win by 8 wickets
Kingsmead Cricket Ground, Durban
Umpires: Siphelele Gasa and Dennis Smith
Player of the match: Senuran Muthusamy (Pretoria Capitals)

- Durban's Super Giants won the toss and elected to bat.
- Pretoria Capitals were awarded a bonus point for a win with a run rate difference greater than 1.25.

Match 16
21 January 2023
13:30
Scorecard

MI Cape Town; 142/9 (20 overs)	v	Paarl Royals (H); 129/6 (20 overs)
Rassie van der Dussen 49 (42); Bjorn Fortuin 2/22 (4 overs)		Jos Buttler 68 (58); George Linde 2/23 (4 overs)

MI Cape Town won by 13 runs
Boland Park, Paarl
Umpires: Adrian Holdstock and Bongani Jele
Player of the match: Jos Buttler (Paarl Royals)

- Paarl Royals won the toss and elected to field.

Match 17
21 January 2023
17:30 (D/N)
Scorecard

(H) Sunrisers Eastern Cape; 127 (18.4 overs)	v	Joburg Super Kings; 128/5 (19.4 overs)
Adam Rossington 40 (31); Aaron Phangiso 4/20 (4 overs)		Leus du Plooy 47* (40); Roelof van der Merwe 2/16 (4 overs)

Joburg Super Kings won by 5 wickets
St George's Park Cricket Ground, Gqeberha
Umpires: Abdoellah Steenkamp and Arno Jacobs
Player of the match: Aaron Phangiso (Joburg Super Kings)

- Joburg Super Kings won the toss and elected to field.

Match 18
22 January 2023
13:30
Scorecard

Pretoria Capitals; 158/6 (20 overs)	v	Paarl Royals (H); 162/4 (19.4 overs)
Theunis de Bruyn 53 (47); Ferisco Adams 2/38 (4 overs)		Jos Buttler 37 (28); Will Jacks 2/7 (1 over)

Paarl Royals won by 6 wickets
Boland Park, Paarl
Umpires: Bongani Jele and Stephen Harris
Player of the match: David Miller (Paarl Royals)

- Pretoria Capitals won the toss and elected to bat.

Match 19
22 January 2023
17:30 (D/N)
Scorecard

(H) Sunrisers Eastern Cape; 210/2 (20 overs)	v	Durban's Super Giants; 86 (14.4 overs)
Adam Rossington 72 (30); Dwaine Pretorius 1/36 (3 overs)		Wiaan Mulder 29 (15); Roelof van der Merwe 6/20 (4 overs)

Sunrisers Eastern Cape won by 124 runs
St George's Park Cricket Ground, Gqeberha
Umpires: Siphelele Gasa and Dennis Smith
Player of the match: Roelof van der Merwe (Sunrisers Eastern Cape)

- Durban's Super Giants won the toss and elected to field.
- Sunrisers Eastern Cape were awarded a bonus point for a win with a run rate difference greater than 1.25.

Match 20
23 January 2023
17:30 (D/N)
Scorecard

Pretoria Capitals; 182/8 (20 overs)	v	MI Cape Town (H); 130 (18.1 overs)
Will Jacks 62 (27); Rashid Khan 3/16 (4 overs)		Dewald Brevis 46 (30); Wayne Parnell 3/14 (3.1 overs)

Pretoria Capitals won by 52 runs
Newlands Cricket Ground, Cape Town
Attendance: 13,898
Umpires: Lubabalo Gcuma and Allahudien Paleker
Player of the match: Will Jacks (Pretoria Capitals)

- MI Cape Town won the toss and elected to field.
- Pretoria Capitals were awarded a bonus point for a win with a run rate difference greater than 1.25.

Match 21
24 January 2023
13:30
Scorecard

(H) Sunrisers Eastern Cape; 130/7 (20 overs)	v	Paarl Royals; 131/5 (18.5 overs)
JJ Smuts 65 (49); Andile Phehlukwayo 2/26 (4 overs)		Jos Buttler 51 (39); Roelof van der Merwe 2/11 (4 overs)

Paarl Royals won by 5 wickets
St George's Park Cricket Ground, Gqeberha
Umpires: Brad White and Siphelele Gasa
Player of the match: David Miller (Paarl Royals)

- Sunrisers Eastern Cape won the toss and elected to bat.

Match 22
24 January 2023
17:30 (D/N)
Scorecard

Durban's Super Giants; 178/6 (20 overs)	v	Joburg Super Kings (H); 182/2 (19.1 overs)
Heinrich Klaasen 65 (48); Gerald Coetzee 3/21 (3 overs)		Faf du Plessis 113* (58); Wiaan Mulder 1/8 (1 over)

Joburg Super Kings won by 8 wickets
Wanderers Stadium, Johannesburg
Umpires: Abdoellah Steenkamp and Shaun George
Player of the match: Faf du Plessis (Joburg Super Kings)

- Joburg Super Kings won the toss and elected to field.

Match 23
2 February 2023
17:30 (D/N)
Scorecard

MI Cape Town; 165/5 (20 overs)	v	Durban's Super Giants (H); 169/5 (19.5 overs)
Rassie van der Dussen 43 (32); Dwaine Pretorius 2/38 (4 overs)		Quinton de Kock 63 (41); Kagiso Rabada 3/22 (4 overs)

Durban's Super Giants won by 5 wickets
Kingsmead Cricket Ground, Durban
Umpires: Arno Jacobs and Shaun George
Player of the match: Quinton de Kock (Durban's Super Giants)

- Durban's Super Giants won the toss and elected to field.

Match 24
3 February 2023
13:30
Scorecard

Paarl Royals; 131/4 (15 overs)	v	Joburg Super Kings (H)
Jason Roy 61 (42); Donavon Ferreira 1/5 (2 overs)

No Result
Wanderers Stadium, Johannesburg
Umpires: Adrian Holdstock and Allahudien Paleker

- Joburg Super Kings won the toss and elected to field.
- No further play was possible due to rain.

Match 25
3 February 2023
17:30 (D/N)
Scorecard

Sunrisers Eastern Cape; 53/3 (5.2 overs)	v	Durban's Super Giants (H)
Adam Rossington 35* (18); Reece Topley 2/20 (2 overs)

No Result
Kingsmead Cricket Ground, Durban
Umpires: Stephen Harris and Bongani Jele

- Durban's Super Giants won the toss and elected to field.
- No further play was possible due to rain.

Match 26
4 February 2023
17:30 (D/N)
Scorecard

MI Cape Town; 159 (19.4 overs)	v	Pretoria Capitals (H); 160/9 (20 overs)
Rassie van der Dussen 51 (29); James Neesham 2/26 (4 overs)		Rilee Rossouw 40 (19); Sam Curran 3/26 (4 overs)

Pretoria Capitals won by 1 wicket
Centurion Park, Centurion
Umpires: Allahudien Paleker and Marais Erasmus
Player of the match: Rilee Rossouw (Pretoria Capitals)

- Pretoria Capitals won the toss and elected to field.

Match 27
5 February 2023
13:30
Scorecard

(H) Joburg Super Kings; 160/6 (20 overs)	v	Sunrisers Eastern Cape; 136/9 (20 overs)
Faf du Plessis 92 (61); Aiden Markram 2/7 (1 over)		Temba Bavuma 50 (34); Kyle Simmonds 3/23 (4 overs)

Joburg Super Kings won by 24 runs
Wanderers Stadium, Johannesburg
Umpires: Lubabalo Gcuma and Bongani Jele
Player of the match: Faf du Plessis (Joburg Super Kings)

- Joburg Super Kings won the toss and elected to bat.

Match 28
5 February 2023
17:30 (D/N)
Scorecard

Durban's Super Giants; 254/4 (20 overs)	v	Pretoria Capitals (H); 103 (13.5 overs)
Heinrich Klaasen 104* (44); Migael Pretorius 2/62 (4 overs)		Eathan Bosch 23 (13); Junior Dala 3/33 (4 overs)

Durban's Super Giants won by 151 runs
Centurion Park, Centurion
Umpires: Adrian Holdstock and Allahudien Paleker
Player of the match: Heinrich Klaasen (Durban's Super Giants)

- Pretoria Capitals won the toss and elected to field.
- Durban's Super Giants were awarded a bonus point for a win with a run rate difference greater than 1.25.

Match 29
6 February 2023
17:30 (D/N)
Scorecard

(H) Joburg Super Kings; 189/6 (20 overs)	v	MI Cape Town; 113 (17.5 overs)
Leus du Plooy 81* (48); Sam Curran 2/26 (3 overs)		Dewald Brevis 27 (26); Kyle Simmonds 3/23 (3 overs)

Joburg Super Kings won by 76 runs
Wanderers Stadium, Johannesburg
Umpires: Marais Erasmus and Adrian Holdstock
Player of the match: Leus du Plooy (Joburg Super Kings)

- MI Cape Town won the toss and elected to field.
- Joburg Super Kings were awarded a bonus point for a win with a run rate difference greater than 1.25.

Match 30
7 February 2023
17:30 (D/N)
Scorecard

(H) Pretoria Capitals; 226/5 (20 overs)	v	Paarl Royals; 167/9 (20 overs)
Kusal Mendis 80 (41); Lungi Ngidi 2/39 (4 overs)		Jos Buttler 70 (45); James Neesham 3/28 (2 overs)

Pretoria Capitals won by 59 runs
Centurion Park, Centurion
Umpires: Marais Erasmus and Bongani Jele
Player of the match: Kusal Mendis (Pretoria Capitals)

- Paarl Royals won the toss and elected to field.
- Pretoria Capitals were awarded a bonus point for a win with a run rate difference greater than 1.25.

== Playoffs ==
=== Bracket ===
Semi-finals
1	Pretoria Capitals	153/8 (20 overs)
4	Paarl Royals	124 (19 overs)
2	Joburg Super Kings	199/6 (20 overs)
3	Sunrisers Eastern Cape	213/5 (20 overs)

Final
1	Pretoria Capitals	135 (19.3 overs)
3	Sunrisers Eastern Cape	137/6 (16.2 overs)

=== Semi-finals ===
8 February 2023
17:30 (D/N)
Scorecard

Pretoria Capitals; 153/8 (20 overs)	v	Paarl Royals; 124 (19 overs)
Rilee Rossouw 56 (41); Andile Phehlukwayo 3/29 (4 overs)		David Miller 31 (27); Adil Rashid 2/15 (3 overs)

Pretoria Capitals won by 29 runs
Wanderers Stadium, Johannesburg
Umpires: Adrian Holdstock and Allahudien Paleker
Player of the match: Rilee Rossouw (Pretoria Capitals)

- Paarl Royals won the toss and elected to field.

9 February 2023
17:30 (D/N)
Scorecard

Sunrisers Eastern Cape; 213/5 (20 overs)	v	Joburg Super Kings; 199/6 (20 overs)
Aiden Markram 100 (58); Lizaad Williams 4/36 (4 overs)		Reeza Hendricks 96 (54); Roelof van der Merwe 2/23 (4 overs)

Sunrisers Eastern Cape won by 14 runs
Centurion Park, Centurion
Umpires: Marais Erasmus and Bongani Jele
Player of the match: Aiden Markram (Sunrisers Eastern Cape)

- Joburg Super Kings won the toss and elected to field.

=== Final ===
12 February 2023
13:30
Scorecard

Pretoria Capitals; 135 (19.3 overs)	v	Sunrisers Eastern Cape; 137/6 (16.2 overs)
Kusal Mendis 21 (19); Roelof van der Merwe 4/31 (4 overs)		Adam Rossington 57 (30); Anrich Nortje 2/21 (4 overs)

Sunrisers Eastern Cape won by 4 wickets
Wanderers Stadium, Johannesburg
Attendance: 22,010
Umpires: Marais Erasmus and Adrian Holdstock
Player of the match: Roelof van der Merwe (Sunrisers Eastern Cape)

- Sunrisers Eastern Cape won the toss and elected to field.
- The final was originally scheduled to take place on 11 February at 17:30 but was postponed due to rain.

== Statistics ==
Most runs
Player	Team	Runs
Jos Buttler	Paarl Royals	391
Faf du Plessis	Joburg Super Kings	369
Aiden Markram	Sunrisers Eastern Cape	366
Heinrich Klaasen	Durban's Super Giants	363
Quinton de Kock	Durban's Super Giants	271

- Source: ESPN Cricinfo

Most wickets
Player	Team	Wickets
Roelof van der Merwe	Sunrisers Eastern Cape	20
Anrich Nortje	Pretoria Capitals	20
Gerald Coetzee	Joburg Super Kings	17
Eathan Bosch	Pretoria Capitals	15
Four players		14

- Source: ESPN Cricinfo

== Awards ==
On 6 February 2023, the list of end of season awards was announced, to be handed out after the final match.

Team	Award	Prize money
Sunrisers Eastern Cape	Champions	R35 million (US$2.37 million)
Pretoria Capitals	Runners-up	R17.5 million (US$1.18 million)
Sunrisers Eastern Cape	Spirit of the season	R100,000 (US$6,765.9)

Name	Team	Award	Prize money
Aiden Markram	Sunrisers Eastern Cape	Player of the season	R350,000 (US$23,680.65)
Jos Buttler	Paarl Royals	Batter of the season	R200,000 (US$13,531.8)
Roelof van der Merwe	Sunrisers Eastern Cape	Bowler of the season	R200,000 (US$13,531.8)
Eathan Bosch	Pretoria Capitals	Rising star	R100,000 (US$6,765.9)
