= Chennai Super Kings Cricket Limited =

Indian company

- Type: Public limited company
- Industry: Sports; Sports services
- Founded: 2014; 12 years ago
- Key people: Kashinath Viswanathan (Director and CEO); N. Srinivasan (Director); Rupa Gurunath (Director)
- Revenue: ▼₹325.30 crore (2022–23)
- Operating income: ▼₹32.14 crore (2022–23)
- Net income: ▼₹13.79 crore (2022–23)
- Total assets: ▲₹490.41 crore (2022–23)
- Owner: India Cements Shareholders Trust (30%); Saradha Logistics (6.9%); Mahindra Group (8.5%); Life Insurance Corporation of India (6%)
- Subsidiaries: Chennai Super Kings; Joburg Super Kings; Texas Super Kings (Note: co-owned with Anurag Jain and Ross Perot Jr.)

Chennai Super Kings Cricket Limited is an Indian public limited company that administers cricket franchises. The company was incorporated on 19 December 2014. The name itself was derived from its first and flagship franchise Chennai Super Kings (CSK), which plays in the Indian Premier League (IPL).

As of 2023, the major share holders include India Cements Shareholders Trust (30%), Saradha Logistics (6.9%) and Life Insurance Corporation of India (6%). The company took over the ownership of CSK in 2014. It also owns the teams Joburg Super Kings in SA20 and Texas Super Kings in Major League Cricket.

== History ==
In 2008, Indian Premier League, a franchise based T20 tournament was launched by Board of Control for Cricket in India (BCCI). Chennai Super Kings (CSK) was acquired by India Cements, a company owned by N.Srinivasan, then president of BCCI. The BCCI had an existing clause in its regulations which prohibited administrators of BCCI from holding commercial interests in the matches conducted by the board. This was modified to enable the ownership of franchises in the IPL by members linked to the BCCI. In 2014, the Supreme Court of India admitted a petition which challenged the amendment and cited conflict of interest. Chennai Super Kings Cricket Limited was incorporated on 19 December 2014. To avoid complications arising out of the conflict of interest case, the ownership of CSK was transferred to the new company. The amendment to the BCCI clause was later voided by the Supreme Court of India in 2016.

== Ownership ==
Chennai Super Kings Cricket Limited is incorporated as a public limited company. The name itself was derived from its first and flagship franchise CSK. As of 2023, the major share holders include India Cements Shareholders Trust (30%), Saradha Logistics (6.9%) and Life Insurance Corporation of India (6%). The company took over the ownership of CSK in 2014.

== Franchises ==
As of 2024, the company owns the following franchises:

Franchises owned by CSK cricket
| Name | City | League | Founded | Home Ground |
|---|---|---|---|---|
| Chennai Super Kings | Chennai, India | Indian Premier League | 2008 (Note: The team was founded in 2008, but the ownership was transferred to CSK cricket in 2014) | M. A. Chidambaram Stadium |
| Joburg Super Kings | Johannesburg, South Africa | SA20 | 2022 | The Wanderers Stadium |
| Texas Super Kings | Dallas, United States | Major League Cricket | 2023 | Grand Prairie Stadium |
