= Janco Smit =

South African cricketer (born 2001)

Personal information
- Full name: Janco Frederik Smit
- Born: 2 February 2001 (age 25); Pretoria, Gauteng, South Africa
- Batting: Right-handed
- Bowling: Right arm fast
- Role: Bowler

Domestic team information
- Years: Team
- 2025-: Titans
- 2025/26–present: Joburg Super Kings

Career statistics
Competition	FC	T20
Matches	8	3
Runs scored	50	0
Batting average	5.55	-
100s/50s	0/0	-
Top score	17	0*
Balls bowled	1079	48
Wickets	23	1
Bowling average	26.13	97.00
5 wickets in innings	–	0
10 wickets in match	–	0
Best bowling	4/40	1/37
Catches/stumpings	1/-	1/–
- Source: Cricinfo, 2 October 2026

Janco Frederik Smit (born 2 February 2001) is a South African cricketer playing for Titans in domestic cricket and Joburg Super Kings in SA20.

== Education and early career ==
Janco Smit was born in 2001 in Pretoria. He studied in Afrikaanse Hoër Seunskool which has produced South African legends like Faf du Plessis and AB de Villiers and current South African players like Wiaan Mulder and Dewald Brevis.

== Domestic career ==
Smit made his first-class debut for the Titans against Boland at SuperSport Park, Centurion, on 3 April 2025. On debut, he took 3/54, including the wickets of Pieter Malan and Grant Roelofsen. He quickly established himself as a reliable bowling option in the longer format. In his second first-class match, against the Lions in the 2024–25 CSA 4-Day Series final, Smit took 3/84, including the wickets of Mitchell van Buuren and Zubayr Hamza.

During the 2025–26 domestic season, Smit became a regular member of the Titans' four-day squad. His breakout spell came during the 2025–26 season in December 2025 against the Dolphins where he recorded match figures of 7/66, including 4/40 in the second innings, which remained his best first-class innings figures as of October 2026.

As of the end of the 2025–26 season, Smit had taken 23 wickets in eight first-class matches at an average of 26.13, with best innings figures of 4/40.

Smit made his Domestic T20 debut for the Titans on 6 November 2025 against Boland in the CSA T20 Challenge.

=== South Africa Emerging Talent squad ===
In August 2026, Smit received his first pathway call-up when he was selected for the South Africa Emerging Players squad for a home series against the Bangladesh. Although he was initially selected for the squad strictly as a 50-over (limited-overs) specialist, he was drafted into the multi-day lineup due to tactical adjustments.

Smit went on to feature in both four-day Test matches, finishing the series as one of the tour's standout bowlers. He claimed 5 wickets in the first match starting 16 August (3/62 and 2/41). In the second match starting 23 August, he registered a haul of 4 for 44 in the first innings, finishing the two-match series with 10 wickets at a combined economy rate of 2.67. He was the second highest wicket taker after Schalk Engelbrecht.

== Franchise cricket ==
In 2026 SA20 auction held on 9 September 2025, Smit was bought by Joburg Super Kings at base price of R200 K. In his SA20 debut against Pretoria Capitals, he gave 37 runs in his 4 overs of spelling and took the important wicket of Dewald Brevis.

He was retained by JSK for the 2027 SA20 season and was one of the twelve players kept in their pre-auction squad.
