= Matthew de Villiers =

South African cricketer (born 2000)

Personal information
- Full name: Matthew de Villiers
- Born: 21 November 2000 (age 25); Cape Town, Western Cape, South Africa
- Batting: Right-handed
- Bowling: Right arm medium
- Role: Batsman

Domestic team information
- Years: Team
- 2024–: Warriors
- 2025/26–present: Joburg Super Kings

Career statistics
| Competition | FC | LA | T20 |
|---|---|---|---|
| Matches | 12 | 8 | 20 |
| Runs scored | 659 | 389 | 545 |
| Batting average | 29.95 | 64.83 | 34.06 |
| 100s/50s | 5/1 | 2/0 | 0/5 |
| Top score | 201 | 133 | 96* |
| Balls bowled | 18 | – | – |
| Wickets | 0 | – | – |
| Bowling average | – | – | – |
| 5 wickets in innings | – | – | – |
| 10 wickets in match | – | – | – |
| Best bowling | – | – | – |
| Catches/stumpings | 20/– | 6/– | 7/– |
- Source: Cricinfo, 3 August 2026

Matthew de Villiers (born 21 November 2000) is a South African cricketer. He is a right-handed batter and right-arm medium pace bowler. Occasionally he acts as wicket-keeper.

== Education and early career ==
Matthew de Villiers was born in 2000 in Cape Town, where he studied at Wynberg Boys' High School. He was a member of the school's first XI in grade 10 when he was 15 years old. In 2023, he led the team, which Protea all-rounder Jacques Kallis had done in the 1990s.

== Club cricket and domestic career ==
In 2019, de Villiers joined Oakmere Cricket Club for the Cheshire Cricket League. In that tournament, he scored 536 runs in 19 innings with the highest score of 115 and took 15 wickets. Later he played for Claremont Cricket Club in Cape Town and scored 924 runs which included three hundreds at the average of 61 in 22 innings. He played for Hambledon Cricket Club in the Southern Premier Cricket League in 2022 and obtained 1295 runs with 92.50 average and took 28 wickets. He became the first batter in 17 years to score more than 1000 runs in the league.

He made his first-class debut with the Warriors for a four-day domestic series match against North West at St George's Park in Port Elizabeth on 31 October 2024.

He was the highest run-scorer in the 2025-26 CSA T20 Challenge with 394 runs at an average of 65.66 and strike rate of 141.21 and led his team Warriors to its second title. He was named player of the tournament.

In 2026, playing for Longridge Cricket Club against Whalley Cricket Club in the Northern Premier Cricket League, he scored 247 runs from just 88 deliveries and hit 6 sixes in the 36th over bowled by Joshua Denrith.

== Franchise cricket ==
De Villiers was first signed by Joburg Super Kings as the replacement player for Brandon King during 2026 SA20 season. He was retained by JSK for the 2027 SA20 season and was one of the twelve players kept in their pre-auction squad.

== Playing style ==
De Villiers is a right-handed middle-order batter known for his attacking approach. His batting style has frequently drawn comparisons with South African legend AB de Villiers, owing to similarities in his surname, stroke play and jersey number.
