= Josh Breed =

South African cricketer (born 1999)

Personal information
- Full name: Josh Breed
- Born: 20 March 1999 (age 27); Cape Town
- Batting: Right Hand Batsman
- Bowling: Leg Spin Googly
- Role: All-Rounder

Domestic team information
- Years: Team
- Western Province (squad no. 19)
- Source: Cricinfo, 22 December 2019

Josh Breed (born 20 March 1999) is a South African cricketer. He made his List A debut on 22 December 2019, for Western Province in the 2019–20 CSA Provincial One-Day Challenge. Prior to his List A debut, he also played in second XI matches for Worcestershire County Cricket Club in England during 2019.
