= Jason Rowles =

South African cricketer (born 2008)

Personal information
- Full name: Jason Wallace Rowles
- Born: 14 April 2008 (age 18); Johannesburg, South Africa
- Batting: Left-handed
- Bowling: Left arm orthodox spin
- Role: Allrounder

Domestic team information
- Years: Team
- 2025-present: South Africa Emerging Players
- 2027–present: Joburg Super Kings

Career statistics
Competition	List A	T20
Matches	5	3
Runs scored	109	56
Batting average	21.80	28.00
100s/50s	0/1	0/0
Top score	60	45*
Balls bowled	162	12
Wickets	3	1
Bowling average	47.33	19.00
5 wickets in innings	0	0
10 wickets in match	0	0
Best bowling	1/27	1/19
Catches/stumpings	0/	1/
- Source: Cricinfo, November 2026

Jason Wallace Rowles (born 14 April 2008) is a South African cricketer. He represents South Africa Under-19 and Joburg Super Kings in SA20. He has played for South Africa Emerging Players team in domestic cricket. He is an allrounder who is left-hand batter and bowls left-arm orthodox spin.

== Education and Under-19 career ==
Rowles was born in Johannesburg, South Africa on 14 April 2008. He attended St David's Marist, Inanda in Johannesburg, where he developed as a cricketer and became involved in the rain Schools SA20 competition.

He was the highest run scorer for South Africa in the Under-19 World Cup 2026, with 280 runs in five innings at an excellent average of 70 and strike rate of 112. In Juns 2026, he was announced the captain of South Africa national under-19 cricket team against England. In July, he scored a double-hundred against England in a Youth Test match in Hove.

He was named among the recipients of the 2025 CSA pathway awards, including recognition as a CSA Under-19 Men's Player of the Year candidate and Khaya Majola Cricket Week Player of the Tournament.

== Franchise cricket ==
Rowles was bought by Joburg Super Kings in a sum of R2.9 M in SA20 2027 auction held on 7 October 2026. He was the costliest pick in the auction even surpassing the price of South African legend Faf du Plessis.
