= 2026 SA20 =

Fourth season of the South African T20 League

2026 SA20 season
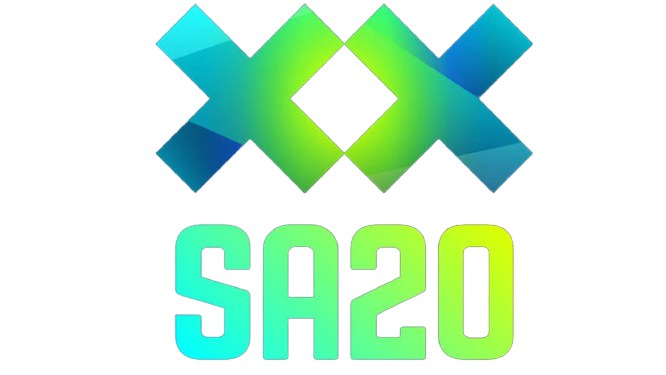
- Dates: 26 December 2025 – 25 January 2026
- Administrator: Cricket South Africa
- Cricket format: Twenty20
- Tournament format(s): Double round-robin and Playoffs
- Host: South Africa
- Champions: Sunrisers Eastern Cape (3rd title)
- Runners-up: Pretoria Capitals
- Participants: 6
- Matches: 34
- Player of the series: Quinton de Kock (Sunrisers Eastern Cape)
- Most runs: Quinton de Kock (390) (Sunrisers Eastern Cape)
- Most wickets: Ottniel Baartman (20) (Paarl Royals)
- Official website: sa20.co.za

The 2026 SA20 season was the fourth season of the SA20, a franchise Twenty20 cricket league in South Africa. The competition, organised by Cricket South Africa, featured six teams. The tournament took place from 26 December 2025 to 25 January 2026, with the final held in Cape Town. SuperSport secured the official broadcasting rights for the SA20, 2025–26 in Sub Saharan Africa regions. Betway returns as the league sponsor this season.

MI Cape Town entered the tournament as the defending champions, having won their maiden title in the previous season. In the final, Sunrisers Eastern Cape defeated Pretoria Capitals by 6 wickets to win their third title.

== Background ==
In January 2025, Cricket South Africa announced the windows of SA20 for the next three seasons. The league was sponsored by Betway. Star Sports Network retained the broadcasting rights for the 2026 SA20 season in Indian subcontinent.

== Squads ==
The player auction took place on 9 September 2025.

Durban's Super Giants Coach: Lance Klusener	Joburg Super Kings Coach: Stephen Fleming	MI Cape Town Coach: Robin Peterson	Paarl Royals Coach: Trevor Penney	Pretoria Capitals Coach: Sourav Ganguly	Sunrisers Eastern Cape Coach: Adrian Birrell
Noor Ahmad (AFG) (Note: Retained); Sunil Narine (WI) (Note: Pre-signed); Jos Buttler (ENG); Heinrich Klaasen (Note: Wild Card); Aiden Markram (C); Kwena Maphaka; Devon Conway (NZ); Gerald Coetzee; David Bedingham; Marques Ackerman; Eathan Bosch; Andile Simelane; Tony de Zorzi; Dayyaan Galiem; Taijul Islam (BAN); Evan Jones (ENG); Gysbert Wege; David Wiese (NAM); Daryn Dupavillon	Faf du Plessis (C); Richard Gleeson (ENG); Akeal Hosein (WI); James Vince (ENG); Donovan Ferreira; Wiaan Mulder; Nandre Burger (Note: Retained using RTM Card); Prenelan Subrayen; Dian Forrester; Steve Stolk; Janco Smit; Neil Timmers; Shubham Ranjane (USA); Brandon King (WI); Rilee Rossouw; Rivaldo Moonsamy; Imran Tahir; Reece Topley (ENG)	Nicholas Pooran (WI); Corbin Bosch; Trent Boult (NZ); Rashid Khan (AFG) (C); George Linde; Kagiso Rabada; Rassie van der Dussen; Ryan Rickelton; Reeza Hendricks; Dwaine Pretorius; Tristan Luus; Jason Smith; Tom Moores (ENG); Dane Piedt; Tiaan van Vuuren; Dan Lategan; Tabraiz Shamsi; Karim Janat (AFG); Jacques Snyman	Lhuan-dre Pretorius; Bjorn Fortuin; David Miller (C); Sikandar Raza (ZIM); Mujeeb Ur Rahman (AFG); Rubin Hermann; Ottniel Baartman; Gudakesh Motie (WI); Delano Potgieter; Kyle Verreynne; Keagan Lion-Cachet; Asa Tribe; Hardus Viljoen; Jacob Johannes Basson; Dan Lawrence (ENG); Eshan Malinga (SL); Nqobani Mokoena; Vishen Halambage; Nqaba Peter; Thomas Rew (ENG)	Will Jacks (ENG); Sherfane Rutherford (WI); Andre Russell (WI); Keshav Maharaj (C); Lungi Ngidi; Dewald Brevis; Lizaad Williams; Craig Overton (ENG); Saqib Mahmood (ENG); Codi Yusuf; Connor Esterhuizen; Bryce Parsons; Gideon Peters; Junaid Dawood; Will Smeed (ENG); Meeka-eel Prince; Bayanda Majola; Wihan Lubbe; Sibonelo Makhanya	Tristan Stubbs (C); Jonny Bairstow (ENG); Adam Milne (NZ); Allah Ghazanfar (AFG); Tharindu Rathnayake (SL); Marco Jansen; Quinton de Kock; Matthew Breetzke; Anrich Nortje; Senuran Muthusamy; Patrick Kruger; Lutho Sipamla; Mitchell Van Buuren; Jordan Hermann; Beyers Swanepoel; James Coles (ENG); Chris Wood (ENG); Lewis Gregory (ENG); CJ King; JP King

== Venues ==
Cape Town	Centurion	Durban
MI Cape Town	Pretoria Capitals	Durban's Super Giants
Newlands Cricket Ground	Centurion Park	Kingsmead Cricket Ground
Capacity: 25,000	Capacity: 22,000	Capacity: 25,000
2026 SA20 (South Africa)
Gqeberha	Johannesburg	Paarl
Sunrisers Eastern Cape	Joburg Super Kings	Paarl Royals
St George's Park Cricket Ground	Wanderers Stadium	Boland Park
Capacity: 19,000	Capacity: 34,000	Capacity: 10,000

== Teams and standings ==
=== Points table ===
Pos	Team	Pld	W	L	NR	BP	Pts	NRR	Qualification
1	Sunrisers Eastern Cape (C)	10	5	3	2	4	28	1.762	Advance to Qualifier 1
2	Pretoria Capitals (R)	10	5	4	1	2	24	0.218	Advance to Qualifier 1
3	Paarl Royals	10	5	4	1	2	24	−0.922	Advance to Eliminator
4	Joburg Super Kings	10	4	4	2	2	22	0.045	Advance to Eliminator
5	Durban's Super Giants	10	3	4	3	1	19	−0.068	
6	MI Cape Town	10	3	6	1	0	14	−1.013	

Source: ESPNCricinfo
(C) Champions; (R) Runners-up
- Points – Win 4, No Result 2. One additional point is awarded for a win when the run rate difference is 1.25 greater than the opposing side's.

=== Points Summary ===
Below is a summary of points for each team's ten regular season matches, plus finals where applicable, in chronological order.

Team	Group matches										Play-offs			
Team	1	2	3	4	5	6	7	8	9	10	Q1	E	Q2	F
Durban's Super Giants	4	6	6	6	8	8	10	14	14	19	—	—	—	—
Joburg Super Kings	4	9	13	15	15	17	17	17	17	22	→	L	—	—
MI Cape Town	0	2	2	2	2	6	10	10	14	14	—	—	—	—
Paarl Royals	0	4	8	13	15	15	19	24	24	24	→	W	L	—
Pretoria Capitals	0	0	5	7	7	11	15	20	20	24	W	→	→	L
Sunrisers Eastern Cape	5	10	10	12	17	19	19	24	24	28	L	W	→	W

Win	Loss	Tie	No result	Eliminated

- Note: The total points at the end of each group match are listed.
- Note: Click on the points or results to see the match summary.

=== Match summary ===
Visitor team →	DSG	JSK	MICT	PR	PC	SEC
Home team ↓	DSG	JSK	MICT	PR	PC	SEC
Durban's Super Giants		Johannesburg; 6 wickets	Match abandoned	Durban; 58 runs	Pretoria; 15 runs	Match abandoned
Joburg Super Kings	Johannesburg; Super Over		Cape Town; 36 runs	Match abandoned	Pretoria; 21 runs	Match abandoned
MI Cape Town	Durban; 15 runs	Cape Town; 6 wickets (D/L)		Paarl; 7 wickets	Pretoria; 85 runs	Cape Town; 3 wickets
Paarl Royals	Paarl; 6 wickets	Johannesburg; 44 runs	Paarl; 1 run		Pretoria; 21 runs	Eastern Cape; 137 runs
Pretoria Capitals	Match abandoned	Johannesburg; 22 runs	Pretoria; 53 runs	Paarl; 6 wickets		Eastern Cape; 10 wickets
Sunrisers Eastern Cape	Durban; 2 wickets	Eastern Cape; 61 runs	Eastern Cape; 7 wickets	Paarl; 5 wickets	Eastern Cape; 48 runs	

Home team won	Visitor team won

- Note: Results listed are according to the home (horizontal) and visitor (vertical) teams.
- Note: Click on a result to see a summary of the match.

== League stage ==
The full fixture list was released on 9 July 2025.

Match 1
26 December 2025
17:30 (D/N)
Scorecard

Durban's Super Giants; 232/5 (20 overs)	v	MI Cape Town; 217/7 (20 overs)
Devon Conway 64 (33); George Linde 2/46 (4 overs)		Ryan Rickelton 113 (63); Eathan Bosch 4/46 (4 overs)

Durban's Super Giants won by 15 runs
Newlands Cricket Ground, Cape Town
Umpires: Lubabalo Gcuma (SA) and Arno Jacobs (SA)
Player of the match: Ryan Rickelton (MI Cape Town)

- Durban's Super Giants won the toss and elected to bat.

Match 2
27 December 2025
13:00
Scorecard

Joburg Super Kings; 168/6 (20 overs)	v	Pretoria Capitals; 146/9 (20 overs)
Rilee Rossouw 48 (33); Tymal Mills 2/17 (4 overs)		Bryce Parsons 41 (30); Duan Jansen 4/23 (4 overs)

Joburg Super Kings won by 22 runs
Centurion Park, Centurion
Umpires: Stephen Harris (SA) and Bongani Jele (SA)
Player of the match: Duan Jansen (Joburg Super Kings)

- Pretoria Capitals won the toss and elected to field.

Match 3
27 December 2025
17:30 (D/N)
Scorecard

Sunrisers Eastern Cape; 186/4 (20 overs)	v	Paarl Royals; 49 (11.5 overs)
Jordan Hermann 62* (28); Ottniel Baartman 2/40 (4 overs)		Asa Tribe 14 (10); Anrich Nortje 4/13 (3 overs)

Sunrisers Eastern Cape won by 137 runs
Boland Park, Paarl
Umpires: Arno Jacobs (SA) and Abdoellah Steenkamp (SA)
Player of the match: Anrich Nortje (Sunrisers Eastern Cape)

- Sunrisers Eastern Cape won the toss and elected to bat.
- Sunrisers Eastern Cape were awarded a bonus point for a win with a run rate difference greater than 1.25.

Match 4
28 December 2025
17:30 (D/N)
Scorecard

Durban's Super Giants; 37/0 (4 overs)	v	MI Cape Town
Devon Conway 24* (13)

No result
Kingsmead Cricket Ground, Durban
Umpires: Siphelele Gasa (SA) and Dennis Smith (SA)

- MI Cape Town won the toss and elected to field.
- Rain prevented any further play.

Match 5
29 December 2025
17:30 (D/N)
Scorecard

Sunrisers Eastern Cape; 188/6 (20 overs)	v	Pretoria Capitals; 140 (18 overs)
Quinton de Kock 77 (47); Tymal Mills 2/31 (4 overs)		Shai Hope 36 (19); Adam Milne 4/25 (4 overs)

Sunrisers Eastern Cape won by 48 runs
St George's Park Cricket Ground, Gqeberha
Umpires: Bongani Jele (SA) and Brad White (SA)
Player of the match: Quinton de Kock (Sunrisers Eastern Cape)

- Sunrisers Eastern Cape won the toss and elected to bat.
- Sunrisers Eastern Cape were awarded a bonus point for a win with a run rate difference greater than 1.25.

Match 6
30 December 2025
17:30 (D/N)
Scorecard

Durban's Super Giants; 86 (17.1 overs)	v	Joburg Super Kings; 88/4 (12.2 overs)
Aiden Markram 22 (27); Richard Gleeson 3/2 (2.1 overs)		Rilee Rossouw 43 (32); David Wiese 1/11 (2 overs)

Joburg Super Kings won by 6 wickets
Kingsmead Cricket Ground, Durban
Umpires: Lubabalo Gcuma (SA) and Dennis Smith (SA)
Player of the match: Prenelan Subrayen (Joburg Super Kings)

- Durban's Super Giants won the toss and elected to bat.
- Joburg Super Kings were awarded a bonus point for a win with a run rate difference greater than 1.25.

Match 7
31 December 2025
13:00
Scorecard

Sunrisers Eastern Cape; 149 (20 overs)	v	Paarl Royals; 150/5 (19.4 overs)
Jordan Hermann 47 (35); Nqobani Mokoena 4/34 (4 overs)		David Miller 71* (38); Anrich Nortje 2/21 (4 overs)

Paarl Royals won by 5 wickets
St George's Park Cricket Ground, Gqeberha
Umpires: Thomas Mokorosi (SA) and Brad White (SA)
Player of the match: David Miller (Paarl Royals)

- Sunrisers Eastern Cape won the toss and elected to bat.

Match 8
31 December 2025
17:30 (D/N)
Scorecard

Pretoria Capitals; 220/5 (20 overs)	v	MI Cape Town; 135 (14.2 overs)
Wihan Lubbe 60 (36); Kagiso Rabada 2/48 (4 overs)		Ryan Rickelton 33 (17); Sherfane Rutherford 4/24 (3 overs)

Pretoria Capitals won by 85 runs
Newlands Cricket Ground, Cape Town
Umpires: Allahuddien Paleker (SA) and Abdoellah Steenkamp (SA)
Player of the match: Sherfane Rutherford (Pretoria Capitals)

- Pretoria Capitals won the toss and elected to bat.
- Pretoria Capitals were awarded a bonus point for a win with a run rate difference greater than 1.25.

Match 9
1 January 2026
17:30 (D/N)
Scorecard

Joburg Super Kings; 205/4 (20 overs)	v	Durban's Super Giants; 205/8 (20 overs)
Shubham Ranjane 50* (31); Noor Ahmad 3/12 (4 overs)		Evan Jones 43 (17); Richard Gleeson 3/41 (4 overs)

Match tied (Joburg Super Kings won the Super Over)
Wanderers Stadium, Johannesburg
Umpires: Lauren Agenbag (SA) and Stephen Harris (SA)
Player of the match: Donovan Ferreira (Joburg Super Kings)

- Durban's Super Giants won the toss and elected to field.
- Super Over: Durban's Super Giants 5/1 (1 over), Joburg Super Kings 8/0 (0.3 over).

Match 10
2 January 2026
17:30 (D/N)
Scorecard

Paarl Royals; 181/3 (20 overs)	v	MI Cape Town; 180/8 (20 overs)
Lhuan-dre Pretorius 98* (65); Rashid Khan 2/31 (4 overs)		Rassie van der Dussen 59 (42); Ottniel Baartman 4/51 (4 overs)

Paarl Royals won by 1 run
Boland Park, Paarl
Umpires: Allahuddien Paleker (SA) and Abongile Sodumo (SA)
Player of the match: Lhuan-dre Pretorius (Paarl Royals)

- Paarl Royals won the toss and elected to bat.

Match 11
3 January 2026
13:00
Scorecard

Sunrisers Eastern Cape	v	Joburg Super Kings

No result
Wanderers Stadium, Johannesburg
Umpires: Abdoellah Steenkamp (SA) and Brad White (SA)

- Joburg Super Kings won the toss and elected to field.
- The match was reduced to 5 overs per side due to rain.
- No play was possible due to rain.

Match 12
3 January 2026
17:30 (D/N)
Scorecard

Durban's Super Giants	v	Pretoria Capitals

No result
Centurion Park, Centurion
Umpires: Mazizi Gampu (SA) and Stephen Harris (SA)

- Pretoria Capitals won the toss and elected to field.
- The match was reduced to 16 overs per side due to rain.
- No play was possible due to rain.

Match 13
4 January 2026
17:30 (D/N)
Scorecard

MI Cape Town; 88 (18.4 overs)	v	Paarl Royals; 90/3 (13 overs)
Reeza Hendricks 18 (24); Sikandar Raza 4/13 (4 overs)		Asa Tribe 34 (28); Corbin Bosch 1/9 (2 overs)

Paarl Royals won by 7 wickets
Newlands Cricket Ground, Cape Town
Umpires: Siphelele Gasa (SA) and Allahuddien Paleker (SA)
Player of the match: Sikandar Raza (Paarl Royals)

- MI Cape Town won the toss and elected to bat.
- Paarl Royals were awarded a bonus point for a win with a run rate difference greater than 1.25.

Match 14
5 January 2026
17:30 (D/N)
Scorecard

Pretoria Capitals; 176/7 (20 overs)	v	Sunrisers Eastern Cape; 177/0 (14.2 overs)
Connor Esterhuizen 52 (33); Anrich Nortje 3/32 (4 overs)		Jonny Bairstow 85* (45)

Sunrisers Eastern Cape won by 10 wickets
Centurion Park, Centurion
Umpires: Dennis Smith (SA) and Abdoellah Steenkamp (SA)
Player of the match: Quinton de Kock (Sunrisers Eastern Cape)

- Pretoria Capitals won the toss and elected to bat.
- Sunrisers Eastern Cape were awarded a bonus point for a win with a run rate difference greater than 1.25.

Match 15
6 January 2026
17:30 (D/N)
Scorecard

Joburg Super Kings; 123/7 (12 overs)	v	MI Cape Town; 128/6 (11.2 overs)
Faf du Plessis 44 (21); Corbin Bosch 3/24 (3 overs)		Rassie van der Dussen 35 (24); Nandre Burger 2/23 (3 overs)

MI Emirates won by 4 wickets (DLS method)
Newlands Cricket Ground, Cape Town
Umpires: Adrian Holdstock (SA) and Arno Jacobs (SA)
Player of the match: Nicholas Pooran (MI Emirates)

- MI Cape Town won the toss and elected to field.
- The match was reduced to 12 overs per side due to rain.
- MI Emirates were set a revised target of 128 runs from 12 overs due to rain.

Match 16
7 January 2026
17:30 (D/N)
Scorecard

Pretoria Capitals; 201/4 (20 overs)	v	Durban's Super Giants; 186 (19.4 overs)
Shai Hope 118* (69); David Wiese 1/34 (3 overs)		Jos Buttler 97* (52); Gideon Peters 3/35 (4 overs)

Pretoria Capitals won by 15 runs
Kingsmead Cricket Ground, Durban
Umpires: Mazizi Gampu (SA) and Bongani Jele (SA)
Player of the match: Shai Hope (Pretoria Capitals)

- Durban's Super Giants won the toss and elected to field.

Match 17
8 January 2026
17:30 (D/N)
Scorecard

Joburg Super Kings; 187/6 (20 overs)	v	Paarl Royals
James Vince 75 (43); Sikandar Raza 2/26 (4 overs)

No result
Wanderers Stadium, Johannesburg
Umpires: Ian Blackwell (Eng) and Adrian Holdstock (SA)

- Paarl Royals won the toss and elected to field.
- Rain prevented any further play.

Match 18
9 January 2026
17:30 (D/N)
Scorecard

Durban's Super Giants	v	Sunrisers Eastern Cape

Match abandoned
Kingsmead Cricket Ground, Durban
Umpires: Stephen Harris (SA) and Thomas Mokorosi (SA)

- No toss.
- No play was possible due to rain.

Match 19
10 January 2026
13:00
Scorecard

Pretoria Capitals; 138/9 (20 overs)	v	Paarl Royals; 117/6 (20 overs)
Sherfane Rutherford 42* (35); Sikandar Raza 2/13 (4 overs)		David Miller 45 (36); Keshav Maharaj 2/14 (4 overs)

Pretoria Capitals won by 21 runs
Boland Park, Paarl
Umpires: Ian Blackwell (Eng) and Arno Jacobs (SA)
Player of the match: Sherfane Rutherford (Pretoria Capitals)

- Pretoria Capitals won the toss and elected to bat.

Match 20
10 January 2026
17:30 (D/N)
Scorecard

MI Cape Town; 234/3 (20 overs)	v	Joburg Super Kings; 198/5 (20 overs)
Ryan Rickelton 113* (60); Daniel Worrall 2/37 (4 overs)		Dian Forrester 80* (42); George Linde 2/30 (4 overs)

MI Cape Town won by 36 runs
Wanderers Stadium, Johannesburg
Umpires: Adrian Holdstock (SA) and Allahuddien Paleker (SA)
Player of the match: Ryan Rickelton (MI Cape Town)

- MI Cape Town won the toss and elected to bat.

Match 21
11 January 2026
17:30 (D/N)
Scorecard

Sunrisers Eastern Cape; 158/5 (20 overs)	v	Durban's Super Giants; 162/8 (19.3 overs)
Tristan Stubbs 47* (30); Noor Ahmad 1/20 (4 overs)		Marques Ackerman 45 (26); Senuran Muthusamy 2/20 (4 overs)

Durban's Super Giants won by 2 wickets
St George's Park Cricket Ground, Gqeberha
Umpires: Stephen Harris (SA) and Andre Olivier (SA)
Player of the match: Tristan Stubbs (Sunrisers Eastern Cape)

- Sunrisers Eastern Cape won the toss and elected to bat.

Match 22
12 January 2026
17:30 (D/N)
Scorecard

Pretoria Capitals; 185/6 (20 overs)	v	MI Cape Town; 132/7 (20 overs)
Sherfane Rutherford 53 (27); Kagiso Rabada 2/33 (4 overs)		Reeza Hendricks 68* (50); Gideon Peters 3/32 (4 overs)

Pretoria Capitals won by 53 runs
Centurion Park, Centurion
Umpires: Ian Blackwell (Eng) and Allahuddien Paleker (SA)
Player of the match: Sherfane Rutherford (Pretoria Capitals)

- MI Cape Town won the toss and elected to field.
- Pretoria Capitals were awarded a bonus point for a win with a run rate difference greater than 1.25.

Match 23
13 January 2026
17:30 (D/N)
Scorecard

Durban's Super Giants; 186/5 (20 overs)	v	Paarl Royals; 191/4 (20 overs)
Aiden Markram 66 (46); Mujeeb Ur Rahman 2/22 (4 overs)		Rubin Hermann 65* (45); Eathan Bosch 2/29 (4 overs)

Paarl Royals won by 6 wickets
Boland Park, Paarl
Umpires: Bongani Jele (SA) and Warren Wyngaard (SA)
Player of the match: Rubin Hermann (Paarl Royals)

- Paarl Royals won the toss and elected to field.

Match 24
14 January 2026
17:30 (D/N)
Scorecard

Sunrisers Eastern Cape; 178/5 (20 overs)	v	Joburg Super Kings; 117 (18.1 overs)
James Coles 61 (34); Donovan Ferreira 2/25 (4 overs)		James Vince 30 (23); Senuran Muthusamy 3/26 (4 overs)

Sunrisers Eastern Cape won by 61 runs
St George's Park Cricket Ground, Gqeberha
Umpires: Stephen Harris (SA) and Arno Jacobs (SA)
Player of the match: James Coles (Sunrisers Eastern Cape)

- Joburg Super Kings won the toss and elected to field.
- Sunrisers Eastern Cape were awarded a bonus point for a win with a run rate difference greater than 1.25.

Match 25
15 January 2026
17:30 (D/N)
Scorecard

Pretoria Capitals; 127 (19.1 overs)	v	Paarl Royals; 128/4 (15.1 overs)
Sherfane Rutherford 29 (20); Ottniel Baartman 5/16 (4 overs)		Rubin Hermann 46 (29); Lizaad Williams 2/28 (3 overs)

Paarl Royals won by 6 wickets
Centurion Park, Centurion
Umpires: Siphelele Gasa (SA) and Dennis Smith (SA)
Player of the match: Ottniel Baartman (Paarl Royals)

- Pretoria Capitals won the toss and elected to bat.
- Paarl Royals were awarded a bonus point for a win with a run rate difference greater than 1.25.

Match 26
16 January 2026
17:30 (D/N)
Scorecard

Sunrisers Eastern Cape; 139/9 (20 overs)	v	MI Cape Town; 140/7 (19.2 overs)
Marco Jansen 42 (23); Corbin Bosch 4/34 (4 overs)		Reeza Hendricks 41 (43); Marco Jansen 2/23 (4 overs)

MI Cape Town won by 3 wickets
Newlands Cricket Ground, Cape Town
Umpires: Arno Jacobs (SA) and Brad White (SA)
Player of the match: Corbin Bosch (MI Cape Town)

- Sunrisers Eastern Cape won the toss and elected to bat.

Match 27
17 January 2026
13:00
Scorecard

Durban's Super Giants; 189/7 (20 overs)	v	Paarl Royals; 131/9 (20 overs)
Aiden Markram 108 (58); Hardus Viljoen 4/21 (4 overs)		Bjorn Fortuin 35* (24); Sunil Narine 2/18 (4 overs)

Durban's Super Giants won by 58 runs
Kingsmead Cricket Ground, Durban
Umpires: Lauren Agenbag (SA) and Allahuddien Paleker (SA)
Player of the match: Aiden Markram (Durban's Super Giants)

- Paarl Royals won the toss and elected to field.
- Durban's Super Giants were awarded a bonus point for a win with a run rate difference greater than 1.25.

Match 28
17 January 2026
17:30 (D/N)
Scorecard

Pretoria Capitals; 143/6 (20 overs)	v	Joburg Super Kings; 122/8 (20 overs)
Sherfane Rutherford 74* (50); Daniel Worrall 2/12 (4 overs)		Dian Forrester 44* (33); Keshav Maharaj 3/15 (4 overs)

Pretoria Capitals won by 21 runs
Wanderers Stadium, Johannesburg
Umpires: Siphelele Gasa (SA) and Bongani Jele (SA)
Player of the match: Sherfane Rutherford (Pretoria Capitals)

- Joburg Super Kings won the toss and elected to field.

Match 29
18 January 2026
17:30 (D/N)
Scorecard

MI Cape Town; 148/6 (20 overs)	v	Sunrisers Eastern Cape; 149/3 (19.5 overs)
Reeza Hendricks 70* (44); Chris Green 3/29 (4 overs)		Matthew Breetzke 66 (55); Corbin Bosch 2/29 (2.5 overs)

Sunrisers Eastern Cape won by 7 wickets
St George's Park Cricket Ground, Gqeberha
Umpires: Arno Jacobs (SA) and Thomas Mokorosi (SA)
Player of the match: Matthew Breetzke (Sunrisers Eastern Cape)

- Sunrisers Eastern Cape won the toss and elected to field.

Match 30
19 January 2026
17:30 (D/N)
Scorecard

Joburg Super Kings; 166/5 (20 overs)	v	Paarl Royals; 122 (18.1 overs)
Leus du Plooy 54* (27); Waqar Salamkheil 2/42 (4 overs)		Dan Lawrence 45 (29); Prenelan Subrayen 3/14 (3.1 overs)

Joburg Super Kings won by 44 runs
Boland Park, Paarl
Umpires: Abongile Sodumo (SA) and Brad White (SA)
Player of the match: Leus du Plooy (Joburg Super Kings)

- Joburg Super Kings won the toss and elected to bat.
- Joburg Super Kings were awarded a bonus point for a win with a run rate difference greater than 1.25.

== Playoffs ==
=== Bracket ===
Qualifier 1
21 January 2026 — Durban
1	Sunrisers Eastern Cape	170/7 (20 overs)
2	Pretoria Capitals	172/3 (18.3 overs)
Eliminator
22 January 2026 — Centurion
3	Paarl Royals	210/5 (20 overs)
4	Joburg Super Kings	174/8 (20 overs)

Qualifier 2
23 January 2026 — Johannesburg
Q1L	Sunrisers Eastern Cape	117/3 (11.4 overs)
EW	Paarl Royals	114/7 (20 overs)

Final
25 January 2026 — Cape Town
Q1W	Pretoria Capitals	158/7 (20 overs)
Q2W	Sunrisers Eastern Cape	162/4 (19.2 overs)

=== Qualifier 1 ===
Qualifier 1
21 January 2026
17:30 (D/N)
Scorecard

Sunrisers Eastern Cape; 170/7 (20 overs)	v	Pretoria Capitals; 172/3 (18.3 overs)
Jonny Bairstow 50 (36); Bryce Parsons 3/10 (3 overs)		Dewald Brevis 75* (38); Chris Green 1/31 (3 overs)

Pretoria Capitals won by 7 wickets
Kingsmead Cricket Ground, Durban
Umpires: Arno Jacobs (SA) and Allahudien Paleker (SA)
Player of the match: Bryce Parsons (Pretoria Capitals)

- Sunrisers Eastern Cape won the toss elected to bat.

=== Eliminator ===
Eliminator
22 January 2026
17:30 (D/N)
Scorecard

Paarl Royals; 210/5 (20 overs)	v	Joburg Super Kings; 174/8 (20 overs)
Lhuan-dre Pretorius 51 (34); Wiaan Mulder 2/45 (4 overs)		James Vince 47 (29); Hardus Viljoen 3/24 (4 overs)

Paarl Royals won by 36 runs
Centurion Park, Centurion
Umpires: Stephen Harris (SA) and Bongani Jele (SA)
Player of the match: Lhuan-dre Pretorius (Paarl Royals)

- Joburg Super Kings won the toss and elected to field.

=== Qualifier 2 ===
Qualifier 2
23 January 2026
17:30 (D/N)
Scorecard

Paarl Royals; 114/7 (20 overs)	v	Sunrisers Eastern Cape; 117/3 (11.4 overs)
Kyle Verreynne 52* (46); Senuran Muthusamy 3/15 (4 overs)		James Coles 45* (19); Bjorn Fortuin 4/26 (4 overs)

Sunrisers Eastern Cape won by 7 wickets
Wanderers Stadium, Johannesburg
Umpires: Stephen Harris (SA) and Bongani Jele (SA)
Player of the match: James Coles (Sunrisers Eastern Cape)

- Paarl Royals won the toss and elected to bat.

=== Final ===
Final
25 January 2026
17:30 (D/N)
Scorecard

Pretoria Capitals; 158/7 (20 overs)	v	Sunrisers Eastern Cape; 162/4 (19.2 overs)
Dewald Brevis 101 (56); Marco Jansen 3/10 (4 overs)		Matthew Breetzke 68* (49); Keshav Maharaj 1/23 (4 overs)

Sunrisers Eastern Cape won by 6 wickets
Newlands Cricket Ground, Cape Town
Umpires: Arno Jacobs (SA) and Allahuddien Paleker (SA)
Player of the match: Dewald Brevis (Pretoria Capitals)

- Sunrisers Eastern Cape won the toss and elected to field.
- Dewald Brevis (Pretoria Capitals) became the first player to score a century in the final of SA20.

== Awards ==
On 25 January 2026, the list of end of season awards was announced, to be handed out after the final match.

Team	Award	Prize money
Sunrisers Eastern Cape	Champions	R32.5 million (US$2.2 million)
Pretoria Capitals	Runners-up	R16.25 million (US$1.1 million)
Sunrisers Eastern Cape	Spirit of the season	R100,000 (US$6,765.9)

Name	Team	Award	Prize money
Quinton de Kock	Sunrisers Eastern Cape	Player of the season	R350,000 (US$23,680.65)
Quinton de Kock	Sunrisers Eastern Cape	Batter of the season	R200,000 (US$13,531.8)
Ottniel Baartman	Paarl Royals	Bowler of the season	R200,000 (US$13,531.8)
Jordan Hermann	Sunrisers Eastern Cape	Rising star	R100,000 (US$6,765.9)
Sherfane Rutherford	Pretoria Capitals	Dispatch of the Season	R100,000 (US$6,765.9)
Dewald Brevis	Pretoria Capitals	Most sixes	R100,000 (US$6,765.9)
Marco Jansen	Sunrisers Eastern Cape	Most dot balls	R100,000 (US$6,765.9)
Adrian Birrell	Sunrisers Eastern Cape	Best Coach of the Season	
