= Joburg Super Kings =

SA20 cricket franchise

- Nickname: JSK
- League: SA20

Personnel
- Captain: Faf du Plessis
- Coach: Albie Morkel
- Owner: Chennai Super Kings Cricket
- Manager: Russell Radhakrishnan

Team information
- City: Johannesburg, Gauteng, South Africa
- Colors: Yellow and Green
- Founded: 2023; 3 years ago
- Home ground: Wanderers Stadium
- Capacity: 34,000
- Official website: joburgsuperkings.com
T20I kit

Joburg Super Kings (JSK) is a South African professional T20 cricket franchise based in Johannesburg, Gauteng.The team competes in the SA20 and was one of the six franchises incorporated when the league was established in 2023. The team plays its home matches at the Wanderers Stadium and is owned by Chennai Super Kings Cricket.

The team is captained by Faf du Plessis and is coached by Albie Morkel.

== History ==
=== Establishment of the franchise ===
In August 2022, Cricket South Africa announced the establishment of the SA20, a Twenty20 Cricket competition to be started in 2023. The teams for the competition, representing six different cities, including Johannesburg, were put up for auction in September 2022. The Johannesburg-based franchise was purchased by Chennai Super Kings Cricket.

=== 2026 Season ===
On 13 July 2026, Head Coach Stephen Fleming and the franchise mutually parted ways. Just a day before the 31st July retention deadline for season 5, assistant and batting coach Albie Morkel was appointed as JSK’s new Head Coach. They retained players like Donovan Ferreira, Dian Forrester, Rilee Rossouw, Prenelan Subrayen, Duan Jansen, Akeal Hosein, James Vince and others and presigned West Indian allrounder Jason Holder. Their major releases included Faf du Plessis, Wiaan Mulder, Nandre Burger, Imran Tahir, Richard Gleeson and others.

In 2027 SA20 auction held on 7 October 2026, JSK repurchased Faf du Plessis and bought West Indian legend Kieron Pollard, Zimbabwe pacer Blessing Muzarabani, American wicket-keeper batter Andries Gous and South African allrounder Dayyaan Galiem (who played for JSK in season 2). But the main surprise of the picks was South African Under-19 sensation Jason Rowles who got a sum of R2.9 M and became the most expensive player of the auction.

== Crest and colours ==
The franchise was named as the Super Kings similar to the existing franchise Chennai Super Kings owned by Chennai Super Kings cricket. The logo consists of a head of a roaring lion in orange with a crown on the top and the team name rendered below in green. The team's anthem is titled "Whistle For Joburg" (transl. To Joburg We Belong!), the latest version of which was released in 2023.

== Grounds ==
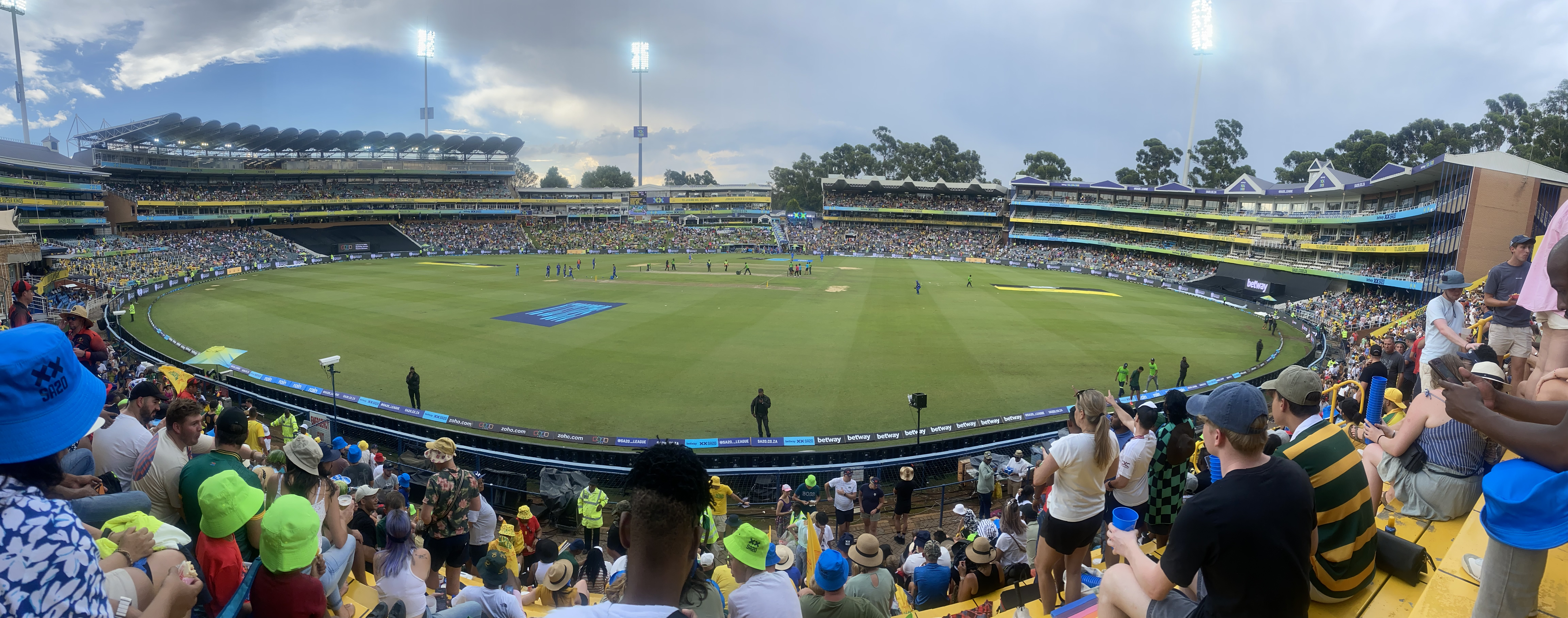
Wanderers Stadium during a Super Kings vs MI Cape Town match in 2024

The Super Kings play their home matches at the Wanderers Stadium (also known as "Bullring") in Johannesburg, which is one of the oldest cricket stadiums in South Africa. The stadium is owned by the Cricket South Africa and has a seating capacity of 34,000.

== Current squad ==
- Players with international caps are listed in **bold**.
- * denotes a player who was unavailable for the season.

No.	Name	Nat.	Birth date	Batting style	Bowling style	Notes
Batters
13	**Faf du Plessis**	(South Africa)	13 July 1984 (age 42)	Right-handed	Right-arm leg break	
4	**Rilee Rossouw**	(South Africa)	9 October 1989 (age 37)	Left-handed	Right-arm off break	
9	**James Vince**	(England)	14 March 1991 (age 35)	Right-handed	Right-arm medium	Overseas
76	Leus Du Plooy	(South Africa)	12 January 1995 (age 31)	Left-handed	Left-arm orthodox	
Wicket-keepers
68	**Andries Gous**	(United States)	24 November 1993 (age 32)	Right-handed	Right-arm medium	Overseas
	**Aneurin Donald**	(England)	20 December 1996 (age 29)	Right-handed	Right-arm off break	Overseas
2	**Donovan Ferreira**	(South Africa)	21 July 1998 (age 28)	Right-handed	Right-arm off break	
30	Matthew de Villiers	(South Africa)	21 November 2000 (age 25)	Right-handed	Right-arm medium	
All-rounders
98	**Jason Holder**	(Cricket West Indies)	5 November 1991 (age 35)	Right-handed	Right-arm medium-fast	Overseas
88	**Jamie Overton**	(England)	10 April 1994 (age 32)	Right-handed	Right-arm fast	Overseas (Note: Jamie Overton was signed as Wildcard player and his salary is outside JSK's auction purse.)
2	**Dayyaan Galiem**	(South Africa)	2 January 1997 (age 29)	Right-handed	Right-arm medium-fast	
14	**Dian Forrester**	(South Africa)	7 June 2000 (age 26)	Left-handed	Right-arm medium	
22	Jarren Bacher	(South Africa)	22 November 2003 (age 22)	Right-handed	Right-arm off break	
49	Jason Rowles	(South Africa)	14 April 2008 (age 18)	Left-handed	Left-arm orthodox	
Pace bowlers
40	**Blessing Muzarabani**	(Zimbabwe)	2 October 1996 (age 30)	Right-handed	Right-arm fast-medium	Overseas
77	**Duan Jansen**	(South Africa)	1 May 2000 (age 26)	Right-handed	Left-arm fast	
38	Janco Smit	(South Africa)	2 February 2001 (age 25)	Right-handed	Right-arm fast	
Spin bowlers
21	**Akeal Hosein**	(Cricket West Indies)	25 April 1993 (age 33)	Left-handed	Left-arm orthodox	Overseas
23	**Prenelan Subrayen**	(South Africa)	23 December 1993 (age 32)	Right-handed	Right-arm off break	

== Administration and support staff ==
=== Current coaching staff ===
Position	Name
Head Coach	Albie Morkel
Assistant Coach	Wandile Gwavu; Rivash Gobind
Batting Coach	
Bowling Coach	Allan Donald
Fielding Coach	Pierre de Bruyn
Physiotherapist	Evan Speechly
Strength and Conditioning Coach	Drikus Saaiman
Head of Talent Scout	A. R. Srikkanth
Analyst	A.R. Srikanth; Matthew Reuben

=== List of Head Coaches ===
Photo	Name	Nationality	Tenure
	Stephen Fleming	(New Zealand)	2023-2026
	Albie Morkel	(South Africa)	2027-

== Statistics ==
=== By season ===
Year	Matches	Won	Lost	NR	Group Stage	Final Result	Most Runs	Most Wickets
2023	10	6	3	1	2/6	Semi-finalists	Faf du Plessis (369)	Gerald Coetzee (17)
2024	10	3	5	2	4/6	Playoffs	Leus du Plooy (377)	Lizaad Williams (15)
2025	11	4	6	1	4/6	Eliminator		
2026	11	4	5	2	4/6	Eliminator		

Source: ESPNcricinfo

=== By opposition ===
Opposition	Span	M	W	L	NR	Win (%)
Durban's Super Giants	2023-26	9	5	3	1	66.66
MI Cape Town	2023-26	8	3	5	0	37.50
Paarl Royals	2023-26	10	3	5	2	37.50
Pretoria Capitals	2023-26	8	3	3	2	50.00
Sunrisers Eastern Cape	2023-26	9	3	5	1	37.50
Total	2023-24	22	10	10	2	45.45%

Last updated: 26 January 2026

=== Most runs ===
Player	Runs	Batting average	High score	100s	50s
Faf du Plessis	1029	32.15	113*	1	7
Leus du Plooy	829	39.47	81*	0	6
Donavon Ferreira	555	22.20	82*	0	3
Reeza Hendricks	411	24.17	96	0	2
Devon Conway	272	30.22	76*	0	1

Source: as of 26 Jan 2026

=== Most wickets ===
Player	Wickets	Bowling average	Best bowling
Nandre Burger	20	32.50	3/26
Lizaad Williams	20	15.90	4/26
Gerald Coetzee	19	13.78	4/24
Imran Tahir	18	26.50	2/13
Donovan Ferreira	16	18.75	3/23

Source: as of 26 Jan 2026

== See also ==
- Chennai Super Kings
- Texas Super Kings
