= Anrich Nortje =

South African cricketer

Personal information
- Full name: Anrich Arno Nortje
- Born: 16 November 1993 (age 33); Uitenhage, Eastern Cape, South Africa
- Height: 6 ft 2 in (188 cm)
- Batting: Right-handed
- Bowling: Right-arm fast
- Role: Bowler

International information
- National side: South Africa (2019–present)
- Test debut (cap 338): 10 October 2019 v India
- Last Test: 9 October 2026 v Australia
- ODI debut (cap 133): 3 March 2019 v Sri Lanka
- Last ODI: 9 September 2023 v Australia
- ODI shirt no.: 20
- T20I debut (cap 85): 18 September 2019 v India
- Last T20I: 1 March 2026 v Zimbabwe
- T20I shirt no.: 20

Domestic team information
- Years: Team
- 2012/13–present: Eastern Province
- 2015/16–2020/21: Warriors
- 2018–2019: Cape Town Blitz
- 2020–2024: Delhi Capitals
- 2023: Pretoria Capitals
- 2023: Washington Freedom
- 2024: St Kitts & Nevis Patriots
- 2025: Kolkata Knight Riders
- 2025–present: Los Angeles Knight Riders
- 2026: Lucknow Super Giants
- 2026: Rotterdam Dockers

Career statistics
Competition	Test	ODI	T20I	FC
Matches	21	22	47	69
Runs scored	207	40	30	926
Batting average	7.96	6.66	3.75	13.22
100s/50s	0/0	0/0	0/0	0/4
Top score	40	10	12	79*
Balls bowled	3,318	1,006	977	11,325
Wickets	75	36	56	239
Bowling average	26.92	27.27	21.19	26.24
5 wickets in innings	4	0	0	9
10 wickets in match	0	0	0	0
Best bowling	6/56	4/51	4/7	6/44
Catches/stumpings	6/–	3/–	10/–	15/–
Medal record
Men's Cricket
Representing South Africa
ICC T20 World Cup
Runner-up	2024 West Indies & USA
- Source: ESPNcricinfo, 22 October 2026

Anrich Arno Nortje (born 16 November 1993) is a South African cricketer. He made his international debut for the South Africa cricket team in March 2019. In July 2020, Nortje was named the newcomer of the year at Cricket South Africa's annual awards ceremony.

== Early life ==
Belonging to a farming family, Nortje's initial interest was in rugby, helped by his 6'2'' frame, but after breaking his collarbone at the age of 17 he switched to cricket, making his first-class debut in 2013, when he was 19.

== Domestic and T20 franchise career ==
He was included in Eastern Province's squad for the 2016 Africa T20 Cup. In October 2018, he was named in Cape Town Blitz's squad for the first edition of the Mzansi Super League T20 tournament. Midway through the tournament, he was ruled out with an ankle injury. In December 2018, he was bought by the Kolkata Knight Riders in the player auction for the 2019 Indian Premier League. However, in March 2019, he was ruled out of the tournament with a shoulder injury.

In September 2019, he was named in the squad for the Cape Town Blitz team for the 2019 Mzansi Super League tournament. He was released by the Kolkata Knight Riders ahead of the 2020 IPL auction. In July 2020, he was named in the St Lucia Zouks squad for the 2020 Caribbean Premier League. However, Nortje was one of five South African cricketers to miss the tournament, after failing to confirm travel arrangements in due time. In August 2020, Nortje joined the Delhi Capitals as a replacement for Chris Woakes in the 2020 Indian Premier League. On 14 October 2020, during the 30th match of the 2020 IPL, Nortje bowled at the speed of 156.22 km/h (97 mph) to Jos Buttler of Rajasthan Royals, the fastest delivery to date in the IPL.

In April 2021, he was named in Eastern Province's squad, ahead of the 2021–22 cricket season in South Africa.

He was selected for the Washington Freedom squad in March 2023, ahead of the inaugural season of Major League Cricket in USA. In November 2024, he was again picked by Kolkata Knight Riders for 6.50 crores INR in the 2025 player auction for the 2025 Indian Premier League.

== International career ==
In February 2019, he was named in South Africa's One Day International (ODI) squad for their series against Sri Lanka. He made his ODI debut for South Africa against Sri Lanka on 3 March 2019. In March 2019, he was named in South Africa's Twenty20 International (T20I) squad also for the series against Sri Lanka, but was ruled out of T20I series due to injury.

In April 2019, he was named in South Africa's squad for the 2019 Cricket World Cup. However, on 7 May 2019, he was ruled out of the tournament with a hand injury and was replaced by Chris Morris.

In August 2019, he was named in South Africa's Test and Twenty20 International (T20I) squads for their series against India. He made his T20I debut for South Africa, against India, on 18 September 2019. He made his Test debut for South Africa, also against India, on 10 October 2019. In January 2020, in the fourth Test against England, Nortje took his maiden five-wicket haul in Test cricket. In March 2020, he was awarded with a national contract by Cricket South Africa ahead of the 2020–21 season.

In September 2021, Nortje was named in South Africa's squad for the 2021 ICC Men's T20 World Cup. In September 2023, he was named in South Africa's squad for the 2023 Cricket World Cup, but was ruled out later due to injury.

In May 2024, he was named in South Africa's squad for the 2024 ICC Men's T20 World Cup tournament.

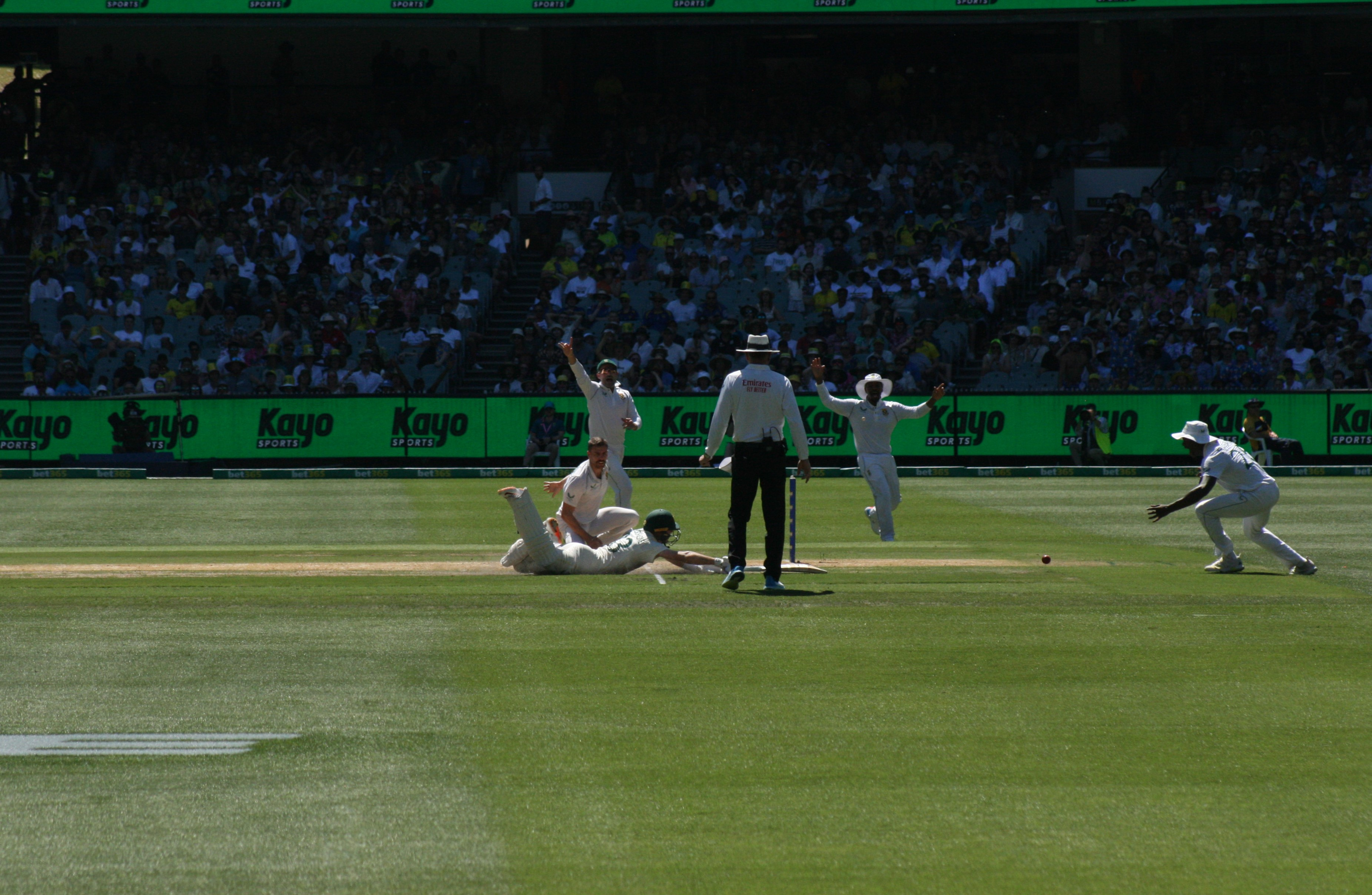
Nortje and Maharaj run out Labuschagne on Day 2 of the Boxing Day Test

== International five-wicket hauls ==
Test five-wicket hauls by Anrich Nortje
No.	Bowling Figures	Overs	Innings	Against	Venue	Country	Date	Result
1	5/110	24	1	England	Wanderers Stadium, Johannesburg	South Africa	24 January 2020	England won by 191 runs
2	6/56	14.3	1	Sri Lanka	Wanderers Stadium, Johannesburg	South Africa	3 January 2021	South Africa won by 10 wickets
3	5/56	24.3	1	Pakistan	Rawalpindi Cricket Stadium, Rawalpindi	Pakistan	4 February 2021	Pakistan won by 95 runs
4	5/36	16	2	West Indies	Centurion Park, Centurion	South Africa	28 February 2023	South Africa won by 87 runs
