= Evan Jones (cricketer) =

South African cricketer (born 1996)

Personal information
- Born: 5 August 1996 (age 30)
- Source: Cricinfo, 13 September 2019

Evan Jones (born 5 August 1996) is a South African cricketer. He made his Twenty20 debut for Northerns in the 2019–20 CSA Provincial T20 Cup on 13 September 2019. He made his first-class debut on 17 October 2019, for Northerns in the 2019–20 CSA 3-Day Provincial Cup. He made his List A debut on 19 October 2019, for Northerns in the 2019–20 CSA Provincial One-Day Challenge. In April 2021, he was named in Northern Cape's squad, ahead of the 2021–22 cricket season in South Africa.
