= Will Jacks =

English cricketer (born 1998)

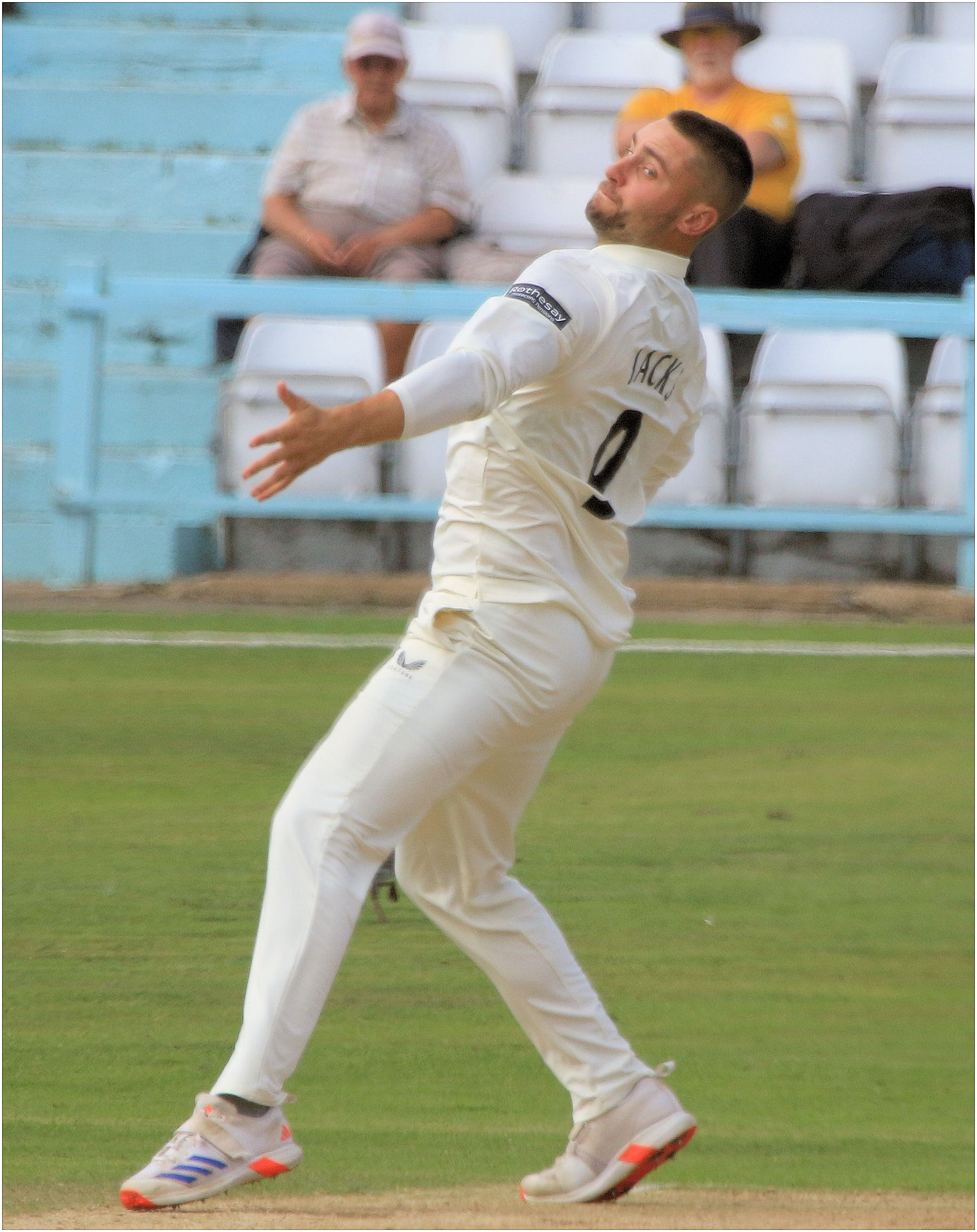
- Jacks bowling for Surrey in 2025

Personal information
- Full name: William George Jacks
- Born: 21 November 1998 (age 28); Chertsey, Surrey, England
- Nickname: The Real Spin Shady
- Height: 6 ft 1 in (1.85 m)
- Batting: Right-handed
- Bowling: Right-arm off break
- Role: Batting all-rounder

International information
- National side: England (2022–present)
- Test debut (cap 708): 1 December 2022 v Pakistan
- Last Test: 4 January 2026 v Australia
- ODI debut (cap 268): 1 March 2023 v Bangladesh
- Last ODI: 18 November 2026 v Australia
- ODI shirt no.: 85
- T20I debut (cap 97): 23 September 2022 v Pakistan
- Last T20I: 19 September 2026 v Sri Lanka
- T20I shirt no.: 85

Domestic team information
- Years: Team
- 2018–present: Surrey (squad no. 9)
- 2020/21: Hobart Hurricanes
- 2021–present: MI London (squad no. 9)
- 2021/22: Chattogram Challengers
- 2021: Islamabad United
- 2023–2025: Pretoria Capitals
- 2024: Royal Challengers Bengaluru
- 2024: Comilla Victorians
- 2025–present: Mumbai Indians

Career statistics
Competition	Test	ODI	T20I	FC
Matches	6	36	48	62
Runs scored	234	1,068	684	2,754
Batting average	21.27	38.14	22.06	32.78
100s/50s	0/0	0/8	0/1	4/16
Top score	47	94	53*	150*
Balls bowled	721	787	348	4,346
Wickets	12	18	22	56
Bowling average	46.16	43.38	22.63	43.92
5 wickets in innings	1	1	0	3
10 wickets in match	0	0	0	0
Best bowling	6/161	5/22	3/14	7/129
Catches/stumpings	1/–	18/–	18/–	60/–
- Source: Cricinfo, 18 November 2026

William George Jacks (born 21 November 1998) is an English cricketer who plays for the England cricket team in all formats of this game. He is a right-handed batter and off spin bowler. He made his Test debut against Pakistan in December 2022. He has featured in various global Twenty20 (T20) leagues.

== Early life and education ==
Jacks was born in Chertsey, Surrey, and attended St George's College, Weybridge. He played youth cricket for Surrey County Cricket Club from under-nine level and represented clubs including Guildford, Cobham Avorians and Valley End. He made his Surrey Second XI debut against Hampshire in 2015 before progressing into the senior side in 2018.

== Domestic career ==
He made his List A debut on 18 May 2018 for Surrey against Somerset in the 2018 Royal London One-Day Cup. In his third game, in the same competition, he scored a match-winning 121 against Gloucestershire. Prior to his List A debut, he was in the England squad for the 2018 Under-19 Cricket World Cup, where he played all six games, including the last as captain.

He made his first-class debut on 20 June 2018, for Surrey in the 2018 County Championship. He made his Twenty20 debut for Surrey in the 2018 t20 Blast on 5 July 2018. Jacks was part of the Surrey team that won the 2018 County Championship.

In a pre-season T10 match against Lancashire, Jacks scored a century in 25 balls, believed to be the fastest hundred in a match between two professional teams in a true cricket ground. His century also included six sixes in one over.

In June 2021, Jacks scored English cricket's third fastest Twenty20 fifty off 15 balls as Surrey beat local rivals Middlesex.

In April 2022, he was bought by the Oval Invincibles for the 2022 season of The Hundred. In August 2022, he scored the highest score in the history of The Hundred at 108 runs in 48 balls. Jacks was part of the Surrey team that won the 2022 County Championship.

Jacks was retained by the Oval Invincibles for the 2023 season of The Hundred. Jacks was part of the Oval Invincibles team that won of the 2023 season of the Hundred.

In December 2022, Jacks was bought by Royal Challengers Bangalore for ₹3.2 crore ahead of the 2023 season of the Indian Premier League (IPL). He was ruled out of the season due an injury he sustained while playing for England. His debut came in the following season, on 11 April, against Mumbai Indians. In a league stage match against Gujarat Titans on 28 April, Jacks scored an unbeaten century in 41 balls, in a successful run-chase. The innings included five fours and ten sixes, and was the fifth-fastest century in the history of the IPL.

In 2024, he and his teammate from Royal Challengers Bangalore, Reece Topley, are heading back to England for "international duties"

== International career ==
In May 2020, Jacks was named in a 55-man group of players to begin training ahead of international fixtures starting in England following the COVID-19 pandemic. In July 2021, he was named in England's One Day International (ODI) squad for home their series against Pakistan, after the original squad for the tour was forced to withdraw following positive tests for COVID-19.

In September 2022, Jacks was named in the England's Test and T20I squad for the away series against Pakistan. He made his T20I debut on 23 September, against Pakistan scoring 40 from 22 deliveries. Later that year, he made his Test debut against Pakistan on 1 December 2022 in Rawalpindi. He took 6 wickets for 161 runs in Pakistan's first innings, helping England secure a 74-run victory.

In February 2023, Jacks was named in both England's ODI and T20I squad as an injury replacement for Tom Abell for the away series against Bangladesh. He made his ODI debut against Bangladesh on 1 March in Dhaka. Later that year, he was included in the squads for the home series against England and Ireland.

In May 2024, he was named in England's squad for the 2024 ICC Men's T20 World Cup tournament in the West Indies and United States. In preparation for the tournament, he featured in England's T20I series against Pakistan. He subsequently represented England at the T20 world cup, where the team reached the semi-finals before being eliminated by eventual champions India.

In September 2024, Jacks featured in England's home white-ball series against Australia. In the opening ODI at Trent Bridge, he scored 62 from 56 balls, before making 84 from 82 deliveries in the third ODI at Chester-le-Street, sharing a substantial partnership with captain Harry Brook as England secured a 46-run victory under the DLS method. Later that year, Jacks was selected for England's white ball tour of the West Indies, featuring in the ODI series in October and November and the subsequent T20I series.

In May 2025, Jacks was recalled to England's ODI and T20 squads for the home series against the West Indies, following the appointment of Harry Brook as white-ball captain. Having previously played predominantly as a top-order batter, Jacks adopted a new role as a lower-order all-rounder, batting at number 7 and taking on greater bowling responsibilities.

In September 2025, Jacks was named in England's 16-man squad for the 2025-26 Ashes series in Australia. A broken finger had ruled him out of England's preceding white-ball tour to New Zealand, but he recovered in time for the Ashes. He was selected for the second test at the Gabba in Brisbane, replacing the injured Mark Wood. He retained his place for all three remaining tests in Adelaide, Melbourne and Sydney. Jacks finished the Ashes with 145 runs and six wickets from four matches, as Australia won the series 4-1.

In December 2025, he was named in England's 15 man squad for the 2026 ICC Men's T20 World Cup tournament. Jacks scored 226 runs at a strike rate of 176.56 and took nine wickets across eight matches. He received four Player of the Match awards, equalling Shane Watson's record for the most in a single edition of the men's tournament. Man of the Match perfomances were vs Nepal (1/17 and 39* off 18), Italy (1/34 and 53* off 22), Sri Lanka (3/22 and 21 off 14) and New Zealand (2/23 and 32* off 18) showcasing his value as an off-spin bowling allrounder. Against Italy, he scored his maiden T20I half-century from 21 balls, setting a new England record for the fastest fifty at a men's T20 world cup. He became only the second player after Shane Watson in the history of the tournament to win four Player of the Match awards in a single edition. He was subsequently named in the ICC Team of the Tournament and shortlisted for the Player of the Tournament award.

In September 2026, Jacks was names Player of the Series in England's three-match ODI series against Sri Lanka. In the opening match at Chester-le-Street, he scored an unbeaten 46 and took his maiden ODI five-wicket haul, recording career best figures of 5/22 in an 89-run victory. Jacks subsequently featured in the ODI tri-series in Pakistan in October 2026 scoring an unbeaten 66 from 30 deliveries against Sri Lanka in Rawalpindi. During England's white-ball tour of Australia in November, he recorded consecutive half centuries in the ODI leg of the tour. During the first T20I against Australia in Melbourne, Jacks suffered a fractured right hand while attempted a caught-and-bowled dismissal, ruling him out of the remainder of the tour. He had been scheduled to captain England for the first time in the fifth T20I in Canberra.
