= Pretoria Capitals =

Pretoria-based franchise cricket team of SA20

- League: SA20

Personnel
- Captain: Keshav Maharaj
- Coach: Sourav Ganguly
- Owner: JSW Group

Team information
- City: Pretoria
- Colors: Blue and Red
- Founded: 2023; 3 years ago
- Home ground: Centurion Park, Centurion
- Capacity: 22,000

History
- Twenty20 debut: v. Sunrisers Eastern Cape at St George's Park Cricket Ground, Gqeberha; 12 January 2023
- Official website: https://www.pretoria-capitals.com/
T20I kit

Pretoria Capitals is a South African professional Twenty20 franchise cricket team that competes in the SA20 tournament. The team is based in Pretoria, and was formed in 2023. The team's home-ground is Centurion Park. The team is coached by Sourav Ganguly. Pretoria Capitals were the runners-up of the first season of SA20

The franchise is owned by JSW Sports.

== History ==
In August 2022, Cricket South Africa announced the establishment of the SA20, a Twenty20 Cricket competition to be started in 2023. The teams for the competition, representing six cities, including Pretoria, were put up for auction in September 2022. The Pretoria franchise was purchased by JSW Group.

=== 2023 season ===
They were the Runner-up of the first season of the tournament after they lose Sunrisers Eastern Cape by 4 wickets in the final at the Wanderers Stadium, Johannesburg. Runner up the inaugural Session under Wayne Parnell's captaincy.

== Current squad ==
The squad of the Pretoria Capitals for the 2026 SA20 season as of 10 September 2025.

- Players with international caps are listed in **bold**.

Pretoria Capitals squad
No.	Name	Nationality	Birth date	Batting style	Bowling style	Year signed	Salary	Notes
Batters
Wicket-keepers
All-rounders
Bowlers

== Seasons ==
=== Seasons ===
Year	League standing	Final standing
2023	1st out of 6	Runners up
2024	5th out of 6	League Stage
2025	5th out of 6	League Stage
2026	2nd out of 6	Runners up

- C: champions
- RU: runner-up
- SF team qualified for the semi-final stage of the competition

=== Season summary ===
Year	Played	Wins	Losses	Tied/NR
2023	12	9	3	0
2024	10	3	6	1
2025	10	2	6	2
2026	12	6	5	1
Source: ESPNCricinfo

Note:

- NR indicates No result.
- Abandoned matches are indicated as no result.

== Statistics ==
=== Most runs ===
Player	Runs	Batting average	High score	100s	50s
Will Jacks	740	29.60	101	1	6
Kyle Verreynne	428	35.66	116*	1	1
Rilee Rossouw	390	15.00	82	0	2
Dewald Brevis	370	41.11	101	1	2
Phil Salt	354	20.82	77*	0	2

Source: as of 26 Jan 2026

=== Most wickets ===
Player	Wickets	Bowling average	Best bowling
Eathan Bosch	27	27.48	3/12
James Neesham	25	19.96	3/7
Wayne Parnell	24	18.41	4/33
Adil Rashid	22	23.81	3/30
Anrich Nortje	20	13.25	3/12

Source: as of 26 Jan 2026

=== Coaching history ===
- Graham Ford (2023 - 2024)
