= South African cricket team in Namibia in 2026 =

	Namibia	South Africa
- Dates: 9 September 2026 – 13 September 2026
Captains	Gerhard Erasmus	Bjorn Fortuin (Note: Prenelan Subrayen captained South Africa in the 2nd ODI.)

One Day International series
- Results: South Africa won the 3-match series 3–0
Most runs	Gerhard Erasmus (92)	Gerhard Erasmus (247)
Most wickets	Ruben Trumpelmann (6)	Duan Jansen (5)
- Player of the series: Jordan Hermann (SA)

The South Africa cricket team toured Namibia in September 2026 to play against the Namibia cricket team from 9 to 13 September 2026. The tour consisted of three One Day International (ODI) matches following on from the 2026 Namibia T20I Tri-Nation Series contested by the men's national teams of Namibia, South Africa and Zimbabwe. All the matches were played at the Namibia Cricket Ground, Windhoek. In August 2026, Cricket Namibia confirmed the fixtures for the series.

== Squads ==
Namibia	South Africa
Gerhard Erasmus (wk); Jan Balt; Jack Brassell; Alexander Volschenk; Jan Frylinck; Zane Green (wk); Max Heingo; Malan Kruger; Jan Nicol Loftie-Eaton; Bernard Scholtz; JJ Smit; Waldo Smith; Louren Steenkamp; Junior Taanyanda; Ruben Trumpelmann; Michael van Lingen	Bjorn Fortuin (c); Corbin Bosch; Eathan Bosch; Matthew Breetzke; Dewald Brevis; Connor Esterhuizen (wk); Jordan Hermann; Rubin Hermann; Duan Jansen; Kwena Maphaka; Nqobani Mokoena; Nqaba Peter; Jason Smith; Prenelan Subrayen; Tony de Zorzi; ~~Lhuan-dré Pretorius (wk)~~; ~~Andile Simelane~~; ~~Lutho Sipamla~~

On 30 August 2026, Lutho Sipamla was ruled out series due to a hamstring injury and was replaced by Andile Simelane in the South African side.

On 7 September 2026, both Andile Simelane and Lhuan-dré Pretorius were ruled out and replaced by Corbin Bosch and Matthew Breetzke.

== ODI series ==
=== 1st ODI ===
9 September 2026
09:30
Scorecard

South Africa; 348/6 (50 overs)	v	Namibia; 162/8 (31 overs)
Jordan Hermann 150 (126); Ruben Trumpelmann 4/68 (10 overs)		Malan Kruger 34 (60); Prenelan Subrayen 4/29 (6 overs)

South Africa won by 99 runs (DLS method)
Namibia Cricket Ground, Windhoek
Umpires: Rashid Riaz (Pak) and Claus Schumacher (Nam)
Player of the match: Jordan Hermann (SA)

- Namibia won the toss and elected to field.
- Namibia were set a revised target of 262 runs in 31 overs due to rain.
- Connor Esterhuizen, Jordan Hermann and Duan Jansen (SA) all made their ODI debuts.
- Jordan Hermann (SA) scored his maiden century in ODIs. His score equaled the record for the highest score on ODI debut.

=== 2nd ODI ===
11 September 2026
09:30
Scorecard

South Africa; 335/9 (50 overs)	v	Namibia; 178 (41.5 overs)
Connor Esterhuizen 119 (110); Jack Brassell 4/64 (10 overs)		Gerhard Erasmus 68 (84); Duan Jansen 4/31 (9 overs)

South Africa won by 157 runs
Namibia Cricket Ground, Windhoek
Umpires: Rashid Riaz (Pak) and Ewoud Lassen (Nam)
Player of the match: Connor Esterhuizen (SA)

- Namibia won the toss and elected to field.
- Nqobani Mokoena (SA) and Waldo Smith (Nam) both made their ODI debuts.
- Connor Esterhuizen (SA) scored his maiden century in ODIs.

=== 3rd ODI ===
13 September 2026
09:30
Scorecard

Namibia; 156 (36.2 overs)	v	South Africa; 157/1 (21.3 overs)
Zane Green 33 (42); Bjorn Fortuin 4/33 (10 overs)		Jordan Hermann 77 (59); Waldo Smith 1/29 (3 overs)

South Africa won by 9 wickets
Namibia Cricket Ground, Windhoek
Umpires: Rashid Riaz (Pak) and Claus Schumacher (Nam)
Player of the match: Bjorn Fortuin (SA)

- Namibia won the toss and elected to bat.
