= 2026 Namibia T20I Tri-Nation Series =

T20I Tri-Nation Series contested by Namibia, South Africa, and Zimbabwe

- Official logo of Tri-Nation Series
- Date: 28 August – 6 September 2026
- Location: Namibia
- Result: South Africa won the series
- Player of the series: (South Africa) Dewald Brevis
- Matches: 7
Teams
| Namibia | South Africa | Zimbabwe |
Captains
| Gerhard Erasmus | Bjorn Fortuin | Sikandar Raza |
Most runs
| Jan Frylinck (162) | Dewald Brevis (226); Lhuan-dre Pretorius (226) | Brian Bennett (107) |
Most wickets
| Ruben Trumpelmann (6) | Duan Jansen (11) | Brad Evans (10) |

The 2026 Namibia T20I Tri-Nation Series also known as FNB T20 Tri-Series, was an international cricket series taking place in Namibia from 28 August to 6 September 2026. It was a tri-nation Twenty20 International (T20I) series contested by the men's national teams of Namibia, South Africa and Zimbabwe. All the matches were played at the Namibia Cricket Ground, Windhoek. In August 2026, Cricket Namibia confirmed the fixtures for the tri-series.

Following the T20I series, Namibia and South Africa went on to compete in a three-match One Day International series.

== Background ==
The series serves as an early preparation ground for the 2027 Cricket World Cup, which is scheduled to be co-hosted by Namibia, South Africa, and Zimbabwe. Additionally, it acts as a launchpad to help establish the proposed continental Africa Cup. Prior to the opening match, Cricket Namibia organized an official tournament launch and photo shoot at the Namibia Cricket Ground in Windhoek, featuring team captains Gerhard Erasmus, Bjorn Fortuin, and Sikandar Raza posing with the tournament trophy.

== Squads ==
| Namibia | South Africa | Zimbabwe |
|---|---|---|
| Gerhard Erasmus (c); Jack Brassell; Alexander Volschenk; Jan Balt; Jan Frylinck; Zane Green (wk); Max Heingo; Malan Kruger; Michael van Lingen; Jan Nicol Loftie-Eaton; Bernard Scholtz; JJ Smit; Waldo Smith; Louren Steenkamp; Junior Taanyanda; Ruben Trumpelmann | Bjorn Fortuin (c); Eathan Bosch; Dewald Brevis; Connor Esterhuizen (wk); Jordan Hermann; Rubin Hermann; Duan Jansen; Kwena Maphaka; Nqobani Mokoena; Nqaba Peter; Lhuan-dré Pretorius (wk); Andile Simelane (Note: Lutho Sipamla was ruled out mid-series due to a hamstring injury and was replaced by Andile Simelane.); ~~Lutho Sipamla~~; ~~Jason Smith~~ (Note: Jason Smith was ruled out of the tri-series due to a hamstring injury.); Prenelan Subrayen; Tony de Zorzi | Sikandar Raza (c); Brian Bennett; Ryan Burl; Graeme Cremer; Ben Curran; Brad Evans; Innocent Kaia; Wessly Madhevere; Tadiwanashe Marumani (wk); Wellington Masakadza; Kundai Matigimu; Blessing Muzarabani; Dion Myers; Newman Nyamhuri; Tafadzwa Tsiga (wk) |

== Round-robin ==
=== Points table ===
| Pos | Team | Pld | W | L | NR | Pts | NRR | Qualification |
|---|---|---|---|---|---|---|---|---|
| 1 | South Africa | 4 | 3 | 1 | 0 | 6 | 1.232 | Advanced to the final |
| 2 | Zimbabwe | 4 | 2 | 2 | 0 | 4 | −1.002 | Advanced to the final |
| 3 | Namibia | 4 | 1 | 3 | 0 | 2 | −0.226 | Eliminated |

Source: Cricinfo

=== Fixtures ===
Match 1
28 August 2026
14:00
Scorecard

| Namibia; 163/9 (20 overs) | v | South Africa; 145/9 (20 overs) |
| Jan Frylinck 60 (38); Prenelan Subrayen 3/32 (4 overs) | | Dewald Brevis 75 (50); Ruben Trumpelmann 3/24 (4 overs) |

Namibia won by 18 runs
Namibia Cricket Ground, Windhoek
Umpires: Ewoud Lassen (Nam) and Langton Rusere (Zim)
Player of the match: JJ Smit (Nam)

- South Africa won the toss and elected to field.
- Duan Jansen (SA) made his T20I debut.

Match 2
29 August 2026
14:00
Scorecard

| Zimbabwe; 144/8 (20 overs) | v | South Africa; 146/3 (13.4 overs) |
| Brian Bennett 34 (35); Duan Jansen 3/45 (4 overs) | | Dewald Brevis 75* (32); Brad Evans 1/19 (2.4 overs) |

South Africa won by 7 wickets
Namibia Cricket Ground, Windhoek
Umpires: Ewoud Lassen (Nam) and Claus Schumacher (Nam)
Player of the match: Dewald Brevis (SA)

- Zimbabwe won the toss and elected to bat.
- Eathan Bosch (SA) made his T20I debut.

Match 3
31 August 2026
14:00
Scorecard

| Zimbabwe; 195/6 (20 overs) | v | Namibia; 190 (20 overs) |
| Ryan Burl 57* (32); Gerhard Erasmus 3/46 (4 overs) | | Alexander Volschenk 56 (29); Brad Evans 3/41 (4 overs) |

Zimbabwe won by 5 runs
Namibia Cricket Ground, Windhoek
Umpires: Ewoud Lassen (Nam) and Langton Rusere (Zim)
Player of the match: Brad Evans (Zim)

- Namibia won the toss and elected to field.

Match 4
1 September 2026
14:00
Scorecard

| South Africa; 185/7 (20 overs) | v | Zimbabwe; 142 (17.4 overs) |
| Lhuan-dre Pretorius 94 (51); Wessly Madhevere 3/20 (3 overs) | | Sikandar Raza 45 (33); Bjorn Fortuin 4/24 (3.4 overs) |

South Africa won by 43 runs
Namibia Cricket Ground, Windhoek
Umpires: Ewoud Lassen (Nam) and Claus Schumacher (Nam)
Player of the match: Lhuan-dre Pretorius (SA)

- South Africa won the toss and elected to bat.
- Kundai Matigimu (Zim) made his T20I debut.

Match 5
3 September 2026
14:00
Scorecard

| Namibia; 156/6 (20 overs) | v | Zimbabwe; 159/5 (18.1 overs) |
| Gerhard Erasmus 88* (48); Brad Evans 2/29 (4 overs) | | Innocent Kaia 72 (42); Ruben Trumpelmann 2/41 (4 overs) |

Zimbabwe won by 5 wickets
Namibia Cricket Ground, Windhoek
Umpires: Ewoud Lassen (Nam) and Langton Rusere (Zim)
Player of the match: Innocent Kaia (Zim)

- Zimbabwe won the toss and elected to field.

Match 6
4 September 2026
14:00
Scorecard

| South Africa; 228/4 (20 overs) | v | Namibia; 217/3 (20 overs) |
| Lhuan-dre Pretorius 101 (53); Jan Balt 2/31 (4 overs) | | Jan Frylinck 72 (36); Nqobani Mokoena 2/43 (4 overs) |

South Africa won by 11 runs
Namibia Cricket Ground, Windhoek
Umpires: Ewoud Lassen (Nam) and Langton Rusere (Zim)
Player of the match: Lhuan-dre Pretorius (SA)

- Namibia won the toss and elected to field.
- Lhuan-dre Pretorius (SA) scored his maiden century in T20Is.

== Final ==
Final
6 September 2026
14:00
Scorecard

| South Africa; 205/5 (20 overs) | v | Zimbabwe; 157 (18 overs) |
| Jordan Hermann 53 (29); Brad Evans 2/36 (4 overs) | | Brad Evans 56* (31); Bjorn Fortuin 3/24 (4 overs) |

South Africa won by 48 runs
Namibia Cricket Ground, Windhoek
Umpires: Ewoud Lassen (Nam) and Langton Rusere (Zim)
Player of the match: Jordan Hermann (SA)

- South Africa won the toss and elected to bat.

== Broadcasting ==
Broadcasters for the series
| Country/Region | Television Rights | Streaming Rights |
|---|---|---|
| Bangladesh | — | Styx Sports |
| Nepal | — | Styx Sports |
| Sri Lanka | — | Styx Sports |
| India | — | FanCode |
| Namibia | One Africa TV | One Africa TV (Website) |
| Zimbabwe | One Africa TV | One Africa TV (Website) |
| South Africa | SuperSport | SuperSport (App) |
| Rest of Africa | SuperSport | SuperSport (App) |
| Rest of the world | — | ICC.tv |
