= South Africa A cricket team in England in 2026 =

International cricket tour

	England Lions	South Africa A
- Dates: 22 May – 9 June 2026
Captains	Dan Mousley (First-class); Jordan Cox (List A); James Rew (List A)	Marques Ackerman

FC series
- Result: South Africa A won the 2-match series 2–0
Most runs	Asa Tribe (195)	Jordan Hermann (211)
Most wickets	Eddie Jack (9)	Tiaan van Vuuren (11)

LA series
- Result: South Africa A won the 3-match series 2–1
Most runs	James Coles (105)	Lhuan-dre Pretorius (181)
Most wickets	Rehan Ahmed (6)	Gerald Coetzee (5)

The South Africa A cricket team is touring England in May and June 2026 to play against the England Lions cricket team. The tour consists of two first-class matches and three List A cricket matches.

== Squads ==
England Lions		South Africa A	
First-class	List A	First-class	List A
Dan Mousley (c); Charlie Allison; Henry Crocombe; Ben Geddes; Eddie Jack; Tom Lawes; Ben Mayes; Ben McKinney; Alfie Ogborne; Liam Patterson-White; James Sales; Naavya Sharma; Mitchell Stanley; Asa Tribe; James Wharton	Rehan Ahmed; James Coles; Noah Cornwell; Jordan Cox; Mason Crane; Henry Crocombe; Scott Currie; Caleb Falconer; Eddie Jack; Saqib Mahmood; Ben Mayes; Ben McKinney; Dan Mousley; Matthew Potts; James Rew; Thomas Rew; Asa Tribe	Marques Ackerman (c); Ottneil Baartman; Tony de Zorzi; Bjorn Fortuin; Zubayr Hamza; Jordan Hermann; Rubin Hermann; Nqobani Mokoena; Dane Paterson; Sinethemba Qeshile; Jason Smith; Prenelan Subrayen; Tiaan van Vuuren; Codi Yusuf	Marques Ackerman (c); Ottneil Baartman; Gerald Coetzee; Tony de Zorzi; Connor Esterhuizen; Dian Forrester; Bjorn Fortuin; Rubin Hermann; Kwena Maphaka; Nqobani Mokoena; Nqaba Peter; Lhuan-dre Pretorius; Prenelan Subrayen; Sinethemba Qeshile

== First-class series ==
=== 1st Unofficial Test ===
22–25 May 2026
Scorecard

England Lions	v	South Africa A
157 (44.5 overs); Ekansh Singh 25 (42); Jason Smith 4/15 (9.5 overs)		331 (58.5 overs); Marques Ackerman 173 (136); Mitchell Stanley 3/77 (14 overs)
387 (106 overs); Asa Tribe 135 (260); Nqobani Mokoena 3/75 (20 overs)		215/2 (50.2 overs); Jordan Hermann 70* (122); Mitchell Stanley 1/27 (11 overs)

South Africa A won by 8 wickets
Arundel Castle Cricket Club Ground, Arundel
Umpires: Ian Blackwell (Eng) and James Middlebrook (Eng)

- England Lions won the toss and elected to bat.
- Ben Mayes (England Lions) scored his maiden century in first-class cricket.

=== 2nd Unofficial Test ===
29 May – 1 June 2026
Scorecard

England Lions	v	South Africa A
193 (55.4 overs); Ekansh Singh 95 (139); Tiaan van Vuuren 5/53 (15 overs)		278 (62.2 overs); Jordan Hermann 103 (111); Henry Crocombe 4/65 (20 overs)
158 (48.5 overs); Rehan Ahmed 44 (80); Tiaan van Vuuren 6/52 (14.5 overs)		75/2 (17.2 overs); Jordan Hermann 32* (43); Eddie Jack 1/13 (3 overs)

South Africa A won by 8 wickets
County Cricket Ground, Beckenham
Umpires: Jack Shantry (Eng) and Rob White (Eng)

- England Lions won the toss and elected to bat.
- The match was scheduled for four days but completed in three.

== List A series ==
=== 1st Unofficial ODI ===
5 June 2026
11:00
Scorecard

England Lions; 119 (26.1 overs)	v	South Africa A 120/1 (19.3 overs)
James Coles 42 (58); Ottneil Baartman 3/17 (5 overs)		Rubin Hermann 57* (62); Henry Crocombe 1/32 (4 overs)

South Africa A won by 9 wickets
Grace Road, Leicester
Umpires: Neil Pratt (Eng) and Tom Lungley (Eng)

- South Africa A won the toss and elected to field.

=== 2nd Unofficial ODI ===
7 June 2026
11:00
Scorecard

England Lions; 198 (47.1 overs)	v	South Africa A 201/0 (30.3 overs)
Caleb Falconer 45 (57); Nqobani Mokoena 4/40 (8.1 overs)		Lhuan-dre Pretorius 116 (114)

South Africa A won by 10 wickets
New Road, Worcester
Umpires: Neil Pratt (Eng) and Tom Lungley (Eng)

- South Africa A won the toss and elected to field.
- Caleb Falconer (England Lions) made his List A debut.

=== 3rd Unofficial ODI ===
9 June 2026
11:00
Scorecard

South Africa A 146 (31.3 overs)	v	England Lions; 148/4 (28.1 overs)
Lhuan-dre Pretorius 65 (57); Rehan Ahmed 6/34 (8.3 overs)		James Coles 63* (58); Gerald Coetzee 2/35 (8 overs)

England Lions won by 6 wickets (DLS method)
New Road, Worcester
Umpires: Neil Pratt (Eng) and Tom Lungley (Eng)

- South Africa A won the toss and elected to bat.
- The match was reduced to 47 overs per side due to rain.
- England Lions were set a revised target of 147 runs in 47 overs due to rain.
