= Bangladeshi cricket team in South Africa in 2026–27 =

International cricket tour

	South Africa	Bangladesh
- Dates: 15 November – 13 December 2026
Captains	Temba Bavuma (Note: Aiden Markram will captain South Africa in 2nd Test.) (Tests); Keshav Maharaj (ODIs); Bjorn Fortuin (T20Is)	Najmul Hossain Shanto (Tests)

Test series

One Day International series

Twenty20 International series

The Bangladesh cricket team is touring South Africa in November and December 2026 to play two Test matches, three One Day Internationals (ODI) and three Twenty20 International (T20I). The Test series forms part of the 2025–27 WTC cycle. In February 2026, the Cricket South Africa (CSA) confirmed the fixtures for the tour, as a part of the 2026 home international season.

== Squads ==
South Africa			Bangladesh		
Tests	ODIs	T20Is	Tests	ODIs	T20Is
Temba Bavuma (c); Aiden Markram (vc); Matthew Breetzke; Corbin Bosch; Tony de Zorzi; Simon Harmer; Zubayr Hamza; Marco Jansen; Keshav Maharaj; Wiaan Mulder; Anrich Nortje; Dane Paterson; Kagiso Rabada; Ryan Rickelton (wk); Senuran Muthusamy	Keshav Maharaj (c); Dewald Brevis; Corbin Bosch; Gerald Coetzee; Quinton de Kock; Tony de Zorzi; Bjorn Fortuin; Jordan Hermann; Duan Jansen; Nqobani Mokoena; Anrich Nortje; Lungi Ngidi; Lhuan-dre Pretorius; Sinethemba Qeshile; Tristan Stubbs	Bjorn Fortuin (c); Dewald Brevis; Gerald Coetzee; Connor Esterhuizen; Donovan Ferreira; Jordan Hermann; Duan Jansen; Kwena Maphaka; Nqobani Mokoena; Nqaba Peter; Lhuan-dre Pretorius; Sinethemba Qeshile; Tristan Stubbs; Prenelan Subrayen	Najmul Hossain Shanto (c); Mehidy Hasan Miraz (vc); Khaled Ahmed; Taskin Ahmed; Jaker Ali (wk); Litton Das (wk); Mominul Haque; Tanzid Hasan; Ebadot Hossain; Tawhid Hridoy; Mahfijul Islam; Shoriful Islam; Taijul Islam; Hasan Mahmud; Mohammad Naim; Mushfiqur Rahim		

On 20 November, Temba Bavuma was ruled out of the 2nd Test due to calf injury and was replaced by Senuran Muthusamy.

== Test series ==
=== 1st Test ===
15–19 November 2026
Scorecard

Bangladesh	v	South Africa
400 (101.2 overs); Tawhid Hridoy 137 (227); Kagiso Rabada 5/70 (22 overs)		557 (124.1 overs); Marques Ackerman 157 (164); Hasan Mahmud 4/118 (30.4 overs)
168 (55.3 overs); Litton Das 39 (38); Simon Harmer 6/51 (12.3 overs)		12/1 (1.3 overs); Aiden Markram 8* (9); Mehidy Hasan Miraz 1/1 (1 over)

South Africa won by 9 wickets
Wanderers Stadium, Johannesburg
Umpires: Ahsan Raza (Pak) and Alex Wharf (Eng)
Player of the match: Kagiso Rabada (SA)

- Bangladesh won the toss and elected to bat.
- Mahfijul Islam (Ban) made his Test debut.
- Only 28 overs were played on Day 3 due to inclement weather.
- Play stopped early on Day 4 due to bad light.
- Marques Ackerman (SA) scored his maiden century in Tests.
- Litton Das effected eight dismissals in the second innings of the match, breaking the record for the most dismissals by a wicket-keeper in a Test innings.
- World Test Championship points: South Africa 12, Bangladesh 0

=== 2nd Test ===
23–27 November 2026
Scorecard

South Africa	v	Bangladesh

Centurion Park, Centurion
Umpires: Ahsan Raza (Pak) and Asif Yaqoob (Pak)

== ODI series ==
=== 1st ODI ===
1 December 2026
13:30 (D/N)
Scorecard

South Africa	v	Bangladesh

Buffalo Park, East London

=== 2nd ODI ===
4 December 2026
13:30 (D/N)
Scorecard

South Africa	v	Bangladesh

St George's Park Cricket Ground, Gqeberha

=== 3rd ODI ===
7 December 2026
13:30 (D/N)
Scorecard

South Africa	v	Bangladesh

Newlands Cricket Ground, Cape Town

== T20I series ==
=== 1st T20I ===
10 December 2026
18:00 (N)
Scorecard

South Africa	v	Bangladesh

De Beers Diamond Oval, Kimberley

=== 2nd T20I ===
12 December 2026
14:30
Scorecard

South Africa	v	Bangladesh

Willowmoore Park, Benoni

=== 3rd T20I ===
13 December 2026
14:30
Scorecard

South Africa	v	Bangladesh

Centurion Park, Centurion
