= South African cricket team in Namibia in 2025–26 =

International cricket tour

	Namibia	South Africa
- Dates: 11 October 2025
Captains	Gerhard Erasmus	Donovan Ferreira

Twenty20 International series
- Results: Namibia won the 1-match series 1–0
Most runs	Zane Green (30)	Jason Smith (31)
Most wickets	Ruben Trumpelmann (3)	Nandre Burger (2); Andile Simelane (2)

The South Africa cricket team toured Namibia in October 2025 to play the Namibia cricket team. The tour consisted of a one-off Twenty20 International (T20I) match. The match was played at the Namibia Cricket Ground in Windhoek. In May 2025, the Cricket Namibia (CN) confirmed the fixtures for the tour. This match inaugurated the opening of Cricket Namibia's first official stadium. It was the first-ever international match between the two sides. Namibia won the match by 4 wickets in last ball thriller.

== Squads ==
Namibia	South Africa
Gerhard Erasmus (c); Jan Balt; Jack Brassell; Jan-Izak de Villiers; Jan Frylinck; Zane Green (wk); Max Heingo; Malan Kruger; Dylan Leicher; Jan Nicol Loftie-Eaton; Bernard Scholtz; Ben Shikongo; JJ Smit; Louren Steenkamp; Ruben Trumpelmann	Donovan Ferreira (c); Ottniel Baartman; Nandre Burger; Gerald Coetzee; Quinton de Kock (wk); Bjorn Fortuin; Reeza Hendricks; Rubin Hermann (wk); ~~Kwena Maphaka~~; Rivaldo Moonsamy; Nqaba Peter; Lhuan-dre Pretorius (wk); Andile Simelane; Jason Smith; Lizaad Williams

On 9th October, Kwena Maphaka was ruled out of the match due to hamstring injury and replaced by Ottniel Baartman.

== Only T20I ==
11 October 2025
14:00
Scorecard

South Africa; 134/8 (20 overs)	v	Namibia; 138/6 (20 overs)
Jason Smith 31 (30); Ruben Trumpelmann 3/28 (4 overs)		Zane Green 30* (23); Nandre Burger 2/21 (4 overs)

Namibia won by 4 wickets
Namibia Cricket Ground, Windhoek
Umpires: Stephen Harris (SA) and Andrew Louw (Nam)
Player of the match: Ruben Trumpelmann (Nam)

- South Africa won the toss and elected to bat.
- Donovan Ferreira captained South Africa for the first time in T20Is.
- Max Heingo (Nam) made his T20I debut.
