= International cricket in 2026 =

International cricket season

The 2026 International cricket season took place from April to September 2026. This calendar included men's Test, men's One Day International (ODI) and men's Twenty20 International (T20I) matches (between full member teams), women's Test, women's One Day International (ODI) and women's Twenty20 International (T20I) matches, as well as some other significant series. In addition to the matches shown here, a number of other T20I series involving associate nations were played during this period.

In June 2026, the International Cricket Council (ICC) updated the Classification of Official Cricket regulations, confirming that teams competing in the 2024–2026 Cricket World Cup Challenge League framework will be eligible to play other sanctioned, non-tournament 50-over games with official List A status during their competition cycle.

The 2026 Women's T20 World Cup was hosted in England in June and July 2026.

The cricket at the 2026 Asian Games for both Men's and Women's, took place in Japan in September and October 2026.

== Season overview ==
=== Men's events ===
International tours
Start date	Home team	Away team	Results [Matches]		
Start date	Home team	Away team	Test	ODI	T20I
17 April 2026	Bangladesh	New Zealand	—N/a	2–1 [3]	1–1 [3]
8 May 2026	Bangladesh	Pakistan	2–0 [2]	—N/a	—N/a
27 May 2026	Ireland	New Zealand	0–1 [1]	—N/a	—N/a
30 May 2026	Pakistan	Australia	—N/a	2–1 [3]	—N/a
3 June 2026	West Indies	Sri Lanka	1–0 [2]	0–1 [3]	2–1 [3]
4 June 2026	England	New Zealand	1–2 [3]	—N/a	—N/a
6 June 2026	India	Afghanistan	1–0 [1]	3–0 [3]	—N/a
9 June 2026	Bangladesh	Australia	—N/a	2–1 [3]	0–3 [3]
26 June 2026	Ireland	India	—N/a	—N/a	2–0 [2]
28 June 2026	Zimbabwe	Bangladesh	1–0 [1]	2–1 [3]	1–2 [3]
1 July 2026	England	India	—N/a	2–1 [3]	4–0 [5]
11 July 2026	West Indies	New Zealand	—N/a	2–3 [5]	—N/a
23 July 2026	Zimbabwe	India	—N/a	—N/a	0–3 [3]
25 July 2026	West Indies	Pakistan	1–1 [2]	—N/a	—N/a
5 August 2026	Ireland	Afghanistan	—N/a	0–4 [5]	—N/a
13 August 2026	Australia	Bangladesh	1–1 [2]	—N/a	—N/a
15 August 2026	Sri Lanka	India	0–1 [2]	—N/a	—N/a
19 August 2026	England	Pakistan	3–0 [3]	—N/a	—N/a
9 September 2026	Namibia	South Africa	—N/a	0–3 [3]	—N/a
13 September 2026	(India) Afghanistan	India	—N/a	—N/a	0–3 [3]
15 September 2026	Zimbabwe	Australia	—N/a	0–3 [3]	—N/a
15 September 2026	England	Sri Lanka	—N/a	2–1 [3]	3–0 [3]
22 September 2026	Japan	India	—N/a	—N/a	0–1 [1]
International tournaments
Start date	Tournament				Winners
2 April 2026	2026 Namibia Tri-Nation Series (round 16)				—N/a
25 April 2026	2026 Nepal Tri-Nation Series (round 17)				—N/a
12 May 2026	2026 Nepal Tri-Nation Series (round 18)				—N/a
6 June 2026	2026 Canada Tri-Nation Series (round 19)				—N/a
21 July 2026	2026 Netherlands Tri-Nation Series (round 20)				—N/a
3 August 2026	2026 Scotland Tri-Nation Series (round 21)				—N/a
8 August 2026	(Tanzania) 2026 Cricket World Cup Challenge League B				—N/a
28 August 2026	2026 Namibia T20I Tri-Nation Series				South Africa
30 August 2026	(Malaysia) 2026 ACC Men's Premier Cup				Nepal
24 September 2026	(Japan) 2026 Asian Games – Men's tournament				India

=== Women's events ===
Women's international tours
Start date	Home team	Away team	Results [Matches]		
Start date	Home team	Away team	Test	ODI	T20I
17 April 2026	South Africa	India	—N/a	—N/a	4–1 [5]
20 April 2026	Bangladesh	Sri Lanka	—N/a	1–2 [3]	0–3 [3]
3 May 2026	Pakistan	Zimbabwe	—N/a	3–0 [3]	3–0 [3]
10 May 2026	England	New Zealand	—N/a	1–1 [3]	2–1 [3]
28 May 2026	England	India	0–1 [1]	—N/a	2–1 [3]
10 July 2026	Ireland	West Indies	—N/a	0–3 [3]	—N/a
23 July 2026	Sri Lanka	Pakistan	—N/a	2–1 [3]	2–1 [3]
10 August 2026	Papua New Guinea	Thailand	—N/a	0–3 [3]	1–1 [2]
28 August 2026	Scotland	Netherlands	—N/a	1–1 [3]	—N/a
1 September 2026	England	Ireland	—N/a	3–0 [3]	—N/a
11 September 2026	Zimbabwe	South Africa	—N/a	—N/a	0–5 [5]
International tournaments
Start date	Tournament				Winners
28 May 2026	2026 Scotland Women's Tri-Nation Series				Scotland
28 May 2026	2026 Ireland Women's Tri-Nation Series				West Indies
12 June 2026	(England) 2026 Women's T20 World Cup				Australia
28 August 2026	(United Arab Emirates) 2026 Women's T20 Asia Cup				India
17 September 2026	(Japan) 2026 Asian Games – Women's tournament				India

== April ==
=== 2026 Namibia Tri-Nation Series (round 16) ===
2024–2026 Cricket World Cup League 2 – Tri-series
No.	Date	Team 1	Team 2	Venue	Result
ODI 4945	2 April	Oman	Scotland	Namibia Cricket Ground, Windhoek	Match abandoned
ODI 4946	4 April	Namibia	Oman	Namibia Cricket Ground, Windhoek	Oman by 3 wickets
ODI 4947	6 April	Namibia	Scotland	Namibia Cricket Ground, Windhoek	No result
ODI 4948	8 April	Oman	Scotland	Namibia Cricket Ground, Windhoek	Oman by 12 runs
ODI 4949	10 April	Namibia	Oman	Namibia Cricket Ground, Windhoek	Namibia by 1 wicket
ODI 4950	12 April	Namibia	Scotland	Namibia Cricket Ground, Windhoek	Scotland by 7 wickets

=== New Zealand in Bangladesh ===
ODI series
No.	Date	Venue	Result
ODI 4951	17 April	Sher-e-Bangla National Cricket Stadium, Dhaka	New Zealand by 26 runs
ODI 4952	20 April	Sher-e-Bangla National Cricket Stadium, Dhaka	Bangladesh by 6 wickets
ODI 4953	23 April	BSFLMR Cricket Stadium, Chittagong	Bangladesh by 55 runs
T20I series
No.	Date	Venue	Result
T20I 3822	27 April	BSFLMR Cricket Stadium, Chittagong	Bangladesh by 6 wickets
T20I 3822a	29 April	BSFLMR Cricket Stadium, Chittagong	Match abandoned
T20I 3827	2 May	Sher-e-Bangla National Cricket Stadium, Dhaka	New Zealand by 6 wickets (DLS)

=== India women in South Africa ===
WT20I series
No.	Date	Venue	Result
WT20I 2724	17 April	Kingsmead, Durban	South Africa by 6 wickets
WT20I 2729	19 April	Kingsmead, Durban	South Africa by 8 wickets
WT20I 2734	22 April	Wanderers Stadium, Johannesburg	South Africa by 9 wickets
WT20I 2739	25 April	Wanderers Stadium, Johannesburg	India by 14 runs
WT20I 2745	27 April	Willowmoore Park, Benoni	South Africa by 23 runs

=== Sri Lanka women in Bangladesh ===
2025–2029 ICC Women's Championship — WODI series
No.	Date	Venue	Result
WODI 1542	20 April	Shaheed Qamaruzzaman Stadium, Rajshahi	Bangladesh by 3 wickets
WODI 1543	22 April	Shaheed Qamaruzzaman Stadium, Rajshahi	Sri Lanka by 4 wickets
WODI 1544	25 April	Shaheed Qamaruzzaman Stadium, Rajshahi	Sri Lanka by 7 wickets
WT20I series
No.	Date	Venue	Result
WT20I 2747	28 April	Sylhet International Cricket Stadium, Sylhet	Sri Lanka by 25 runs
WT20I 2750	30 April	Sylhet International Cricket Stadium, Sylhet	Sri Lanka by 21 runs
WT20I 2754	2 May	Sylhet International Cricket Stadium, Sylhet	Sri Lanka by 3 runs

=== 2026 Nepal Tri-Nation Series (round 17) ===
2024–2026 Cricket World Cup League 2 – Tri-series
No.	Date	Team 1	Team 2	Venue	Result
ODI 4954	25 April	Nepal	United Arab Emirates	Tribhuvan University International Cricket Ground, Kirtipur	Nepal by 37 runs
ODI 4955	27 April	Oman	United Arab Emirates	Tribhuvan University International Cricket Ground, Kirtipur	United Arab Emirates by 25 runs
ODI 4956	29 April	Nepal	Oman	Tribhuvan University International Cricket Ground, Kirtipur	Oman by 102 runs (DLS)
ODI 4957	1 May	Nepal	United Arab Emirates	Tribhuvan University International Cricket Ground, Kirtipur	Nepal by 6 runs (DLS)
ODI 4958	3 May	Oman	United Arab Emirates	Tribhuvan University International Cricket Ground, Kirtipur	United Arab Emirates by 54 runs
ODI 4959	5 May	Nepal	Oman	Tribhuvan University International Cricket Ground, Kirtipur	Nepal by 81 runs

== May ==
=== Zimbabwe women in Pakistan ===
2025–2029 ICC Women's Championship — WODI series
No.	Date	Venue	Result
WODI 1545	4 May	National Stadium, Karachi	Pakistan by 168 runs
WODI 1546	6 May	National Stadium, Karachi	Pakistan by 206 runs
WODI 1547	9 May	National Stadium, Karachi	Pakistan by 9 wickets
WT20I series
No.	Date	Venue	Result
WT20I 2766	12 May	National Stadium, Karachi	Pakistan by 153 runs
WT20I 2767	14 May	National Stadium, Karachi	Pakistan by 67 runs
WT20I 2769	15 May	National Stadium, Karachi	Pakistan by 133 runs

=== Pakistan in Bangladesh ===
2025–2027 ICC World Test Championship – Test series
No.	Date	Venue	Result
Test 2617	8–12 May	Sher-e-Bangla National Cricket Stadium, Dhaka	Bangladesh by 104 runs
Test 2618	16–20 May	Sylhet International Cricket Stadium, Sylhet	Bangladesh by 78 runs

=== New Zealand women in England ===
2025–2029 ICC Women's Championship — WODI series
No.	Date	Venue	Result
WODI 1548	10 May	Riverside Ground, Chester-le-Street	England by 1 wicket
WODI 1549	13 May	County Ground, Northampton	No result
WODI 1550	16 May	Sophia Gardens, Cardiff	New Zealand by 17 runs (DLS)
WT20I series
No.	Date	Venue	Result
WT20I 2772	20 May	County Ground, Derby	England by 7 wickets
WT20I 2774	23 May	St Lawrence Ground, Canterbury	New Zealand by 14 runs
WT20I 2775	25 May	County Ground, Hove	England by 7 wickets

=== 2026 Nepal Tri-Nation Series (round 18) ===
2024–2026 Cricket World Cup League 2 – Tri-series
No.	Date	Team 1	Team 2	Venue	Result
ODI 4960	12 May	Nepal	Scotland	Tribhuvan University International Cricket Ground, Kirtipur	Scotland by 2 runs (DLS)
ODI 4961	14 May	Scotland	United States	Tribhuvan University International Cricket Ground, Kirtipur	Scotland by 2 runs (DLS)
ODI 4962	16 May	Nepal	United States	Tribhuvan University International Cricket Ground, Kirtipur	Nepal by 9 wickets
ODI 4963	18 May	Nepal	Scotland	Tribhuvan University International Cricket Ground, Kirtipur	Nepal by 6 wickets
ODI 4964	20 May	Scotland	United States	Tribhuvan University International Cricket Ground, Kirtipur	United States by 6 wickets
ODI 4965	22 May	Nepal	United States	Tribhuvan University International Cricket Ground, Kirtipur	Nepal by 122 runs

=== New Zealand in Ireland ===
Test match
No.	Date	Venue	Result
Test 2619	27–30 May	Stormont Cricket Ground, Belfast	New Zealand by an innings and 79 runs

=== 2026 Scotland Women's Tri-Nation Series ===
Pos	Team	Pld	W	L	NR	Pts	NRR
1	Scotland	4	3	1	0	6	1.036
2	Bangladesh	4	2	2	0	4	0.059
3	Netherlands	4	1	3	0	2	−1.395

Source: Cricinfo

Round-robin
No.	Date	Team 1	Team 2	Venue	Result
WT20I 2782	28 May	Scotland	Netherlands	The Grange Club, Edinburgh	Scotland by 9 wickets
WT20I 2791	30 May	Scotland	Bangladesh	The Grange Club, Edinburgh	Scotland by 8 wickets
WT20I 2796	31 May	Bangladesh	Netherlands	The Grange Club, Edinburgh	Netherlands by 8 runs
WT20I 2799	2 June	Scotland	Bangladesh	The Grange Club, Edinburgh	Bangladesh by 34 runs
WT20I 2809	3 June	Scotland	Netherlands	The Grange Club, Edinburgh	Scotland by 24 runs (DLS)
WT20I 2819	4 June	Bangladesh	Netherlands	The Grange Club, Edinburgh	Bangladesh by 13 runs

=== 2026 Ireland Women's Tri-Nation Series ===
Pos	Team	Pld	W	L	NR	Pts	NRR
1	West Indies	4	2	1	1	10	1.839
2	Ireland	4	2	1	1	10	−1.171
3	Pakistan	4	0	2	2	4	−0.850

Source: Cricinfo

Round-robin
No.	Date	Team 1	Team 2	Venue	Result
WT20I 2783	28 May	Ireland	West Indies	Castle Avenue, Clontarf	West Indies by 8 wickets
WT20I 2786	29 May	Pakistan	West Indies	Castle Avenue, Clontarf	West Indies by 25 runs
WT20I 2797	31 May	Ireland	Pakistan	Castle Avenue, Clontarf	Ireland by 7 wickets
WT20I 2798	1 June	Ireland	West Indies	Castle Avenue, Clontarf	Ireland by 1 run (DLS)
WT20I 2810	3 June	Pakistan	West Indies	Castle Avenue, Clontarf	No result
WT20I 2819a	4 June	Ireland	Pakistan	Castle Avenue, Clontarf	Match abandoned

=== India women in England ===
WT20I series
No.	Date	Venue	Result
WT20I 2784	28 May	County Ground, Chelmsford	India by 38 runs
WT20I 2792	30 May	Bristol County Ground, Bristol	England by 26 runs
WT20I 2800	2 June	County Ground, Taunton	England by 6 wickets
WTest match
No.	Date	Venue	Result
WTest 153	10–13 July	Lord's, London	India by 270 runs

=== Australia in Pakistan ===
ODI series
No.	Date	Venue	Result
ODI 4966	30 May	Rawalpindi Cricket Stadium, Rawalpindi	Pakistan by 5 wickets
ODI 4967	2 June	Gaddafi Stadium, Lahore	Australia by 41 runs
ODI 4969	4 June	Gaddafi Stadium, Lahore	Pakistan by 4 wickets

== June ==
=== Sri Lanka in the West Indies ===
ODI series
No.	Date	Venue	Result
ODI 4968	3 June	Sabina Park, Kingston	Sri Lanka by 41 runs
ODI 4971	6 June	Sabina Park, Kingston	No result
ODI 4972a	8 June	Sabina Park, Kingston	Match abandoned
T20I series
No.	Date	Venue	Result
T20I 3947	11 June	Sabina Park, Kingston	West Indies by 7 wickets
T20I 3952	13 June	Sabina Park, Kingston	Sri Lanka by 37 runs
T20I 3955	14 June	Sabina Park, Kingston	West Indies by 5 wickets
2025–2027 ICC World Test Championship – Test series
No.	Date	Venue	Result
Test 2624	25–29 June	Sir Vivian Richards Stadium, North Sound	West Indies by an innings and 217 runs
Test 2626	3–7 July	Sir Vivian Richards Stadium, North Sound	Match drawn

=== New Zealand in England ===
2025–2027 ICC World Test Championship – Test series
No.	Date	Venue	Result
Test 2620	4–8 June	Lord's, London	England by 115 runs
Test 2622	17–21 June	The Oval, London	New Zealand by 253 runs
Test 2623	25–29 June	Trent Bridge, Nottingham	New Zealand by 160 runs

=== Afghanistan in India ===
Only Test
No.	Date	Venue	Result
Test 2621	6–10 June	Maharaja Yadavindra Singh International Cricket Stadium, New Chandigarh	India by an innings and 300 runs
ODI Series
No.	Date	Venue	Result
ODI 4977	13 June	Himachal Pradesh Cricket Association Stadium, Dharamshala	India by 7 wickets
ODI 4980	17 June	Ekana Cricket Stadium, Lucknow	India by 170 runs
ODI 4981	20 June	M. A. Chidambaram Stadium, Chennai	India by 9 wickets

=== 2026 Canada Tri-Nation Series (round 19) ===
2024–2026 Cricket World Cup League 2 – Tri-series
No.	Date	Team 1	Team 2	Venue	Result
ODI 4970	6 June	Canada	United States	Maple Leaf Cricket Club, King City	United States by 8 wickets
ODI 4972	8 June	Netherlands	United States	Maple Leaf Cricket Club, King City	Netherlands by 21 runs
ODI 4974	10 June	Canada	Netherlands	Maple Leaf Cricket Club, King City	Canada by 2 wickets
ODI 4976	12 June	Canada	United States	Maple Leaf Cricket Club, King City	United States by 5 wickets
ODI 4978a	14 June	Netherlands	United States	Maple Leaf Cricket Club, King City	Match abandoned
ODI 4979	16 June	Canada	Netherlands	Maple Leaf Cricket Club, King City	No result

=== Australia in Bangladesh ===
ODI series
No.	Date	Venue	Result
ODI 4973	9 June	Sher-e-Bangla National Cricket Stadium, Dhaka	Bangladesh by 86 runs (DLS)
ODI 4975	11 June	Sher-e-Bangla National Cricket Stadium, Dhaka	Bangladesh by 5 wickets (DLS)
ODI 4978	14 June	Sher-e-Bangla National Cricket Stadium, Dhaka	Australia by 1 wicket
T20I series
No.	Date	Venue	Result
T20I 3956	17 June	Bir Shrestho Flight Lieutenant Matiur Rahman Cricket Stadium, Chittagong	Australia by 4 wickets
T20I 3960	19 June	Bir Shrestho Flight Lieutenant Matiur Rahman Cricket Stadium, Chittagong	Australia by 7 runs
T20I 3972	21 June	Bir Shrestho Flight Lieutenant Matiur Rahman Cricket Stadium, Chittagong	Australia by 7 wickets

=== 2026 Women's T20 World Cup ===
Group A standings
Pos	Team	Pld	W	L	NR	Pts	NRR	Qualification
1	Australia	5	5	0	0	10	3.882	Advanced to the knockout stage
2	South Africa	5	4	1	0	8	0.633	Advanced to the knockout stage
3	India	5	3	2	0	6	1.718	Eliminated
4	Bangladesh	5	2	3	0	4	−0.710	Eliminated
5	Pakistan	5	1	4	0	2	−1.872	Eliminated
6	Netherlands	5	0	5	0	0	−3.276	Eliminated

Source: Cricinfo
Rules for classification: 1) Points; 2) Wins; 3) Net run rate; 4) Results of games between tied teams; 5) WT20I Rankings ahead of the tournament

Group B standings
Pos	Team	Pld	W	L	NR	Pts	NRR	Qualification
1	England (H)	5	5	0	0	10	2.134	Advanced to the knockout stage
2	West Indies	5	3	2	0	6	−0.147	Advanced to the knockout stage
3	Sri Lanka	5	3	2	0	6	−0.725	Eliminated
4	New Zealand	5	2	3	0	4	−0.118	Eliminated
5	Scotland	5	1	4	0	2	−0.232	Eliminated
6	Ireland	5	1	4	0	2	−0.875	Eliminated

Source: ESPNcricinfo
Rules for classification: 1) Points; 2) Wins; 3) Net run rate; 4) Results of games between tied teams; 5) WT20I Rankings ahead of the tournament
(H) Hosts

Round-robin
No.	Date	Team 1	Team 2	Venue	Result
WT20I 2847	12 June	England	Sri Lanka	Edgbaston Cricket Ground, Birmingham	England by 87 runs
WT20I 2850	13 June	Ireland	Scotland	Old Trafford Cricket Ground, Manchester	Scotland by 40 runs
WT20I 2851	13 June	Australia	South Africa	Old Trafford Cricket Ground, Manchester	Australia by 65 runs
WT20I 2852	13 June	New Zealand	West Indies	Rose Bowl, Southampton	West Indies by 7 wickets
WT20I 2854	14 June	Bangladesh	Netherlands	Edgbaston Cricket Ground, Birmingham	Bangladesh by 6 wickets
WT20I 2857	14 June	India	Pakistan	Edgbaston Cricket Ground, Birmingham	India by 64 runs
WT20I 2861	16 June	New Zealand	Sri Lanka	Rose Bowl, Southampton	Sri Lanka by 5 wickets
WT20I 2862	16 June	England	Ireland	Rose Bowl, Southampton	England by 4 wickets
WT20I 2863	17 June	Australia	Bangladesh	Headingley Cricket Ground, Leeds	Australia by 9 wickets
WT20I 2865	17 June	India	Netherlands	Headingley Cricket Ground, Leeds	India by 95 runs
WT20I 2866	17 June	Pakistan	South Africa	Edgbaston Cricket Ground, Birmingham	South Africa by 2 wickets
WT20I 2870	18 June	Scotland	West Indies	Headingley Cricket Ground, Leeds	West Indies by 7 runs
WT20I 2874	19 June	Ireland	New Zealand	Rose Bowl, Southampton	New Zealand by 4 runs
WT20I 2877	20 June	Australia	Netherlands	Rose Bowl, Southampton	Australia by 98 runs
WT20I 2878	20 June	Bangladesh	Pakistan	Rose Bowl, Southampton	Bangladesh by 23 runs
WT20I 2879	20 June	England	Scotland	Headingley Cricket Ground, Leeds	England by 38 runs
WT20I 2880	21 June	Sri Lanka	West Indies	Bristol County Ground, Bristol	West Indies by 5 wickets
WT20I 2881	21 June	India	South Africa	Old Trafford Cricket Ground, Manchester	South Africa by 6 wickets
WT20I 2882	23 June	New Zealand	Scotland	Bristol County Ground, Bristol	New Zealand by 6 wickets
WT20I 2883	23 June	Ireland	Sri Lanka	Bristol County Ground, Bristol	Sri Lanka by 9 wickets
WT20I 2884	23 June	Australia	Pakistan	Headingley Cricket Ground, Leeds	Australia by 113 runs
WT20I 2885	24 June	England	West Indies	Lord's, London	England by 39 runs
WT20I 2886	25 June	Bangladesh	India	Old Trafford Cricket Ground, Manchester	India by 5 wickets
WT20I 2887	25 June	Netherlands	South Africa	Bristol County Ground, Bristol	South Africa by 88 runs
WT20I 2891	26 June	Scotland	Sri Lanka	Old Trafford Cricket Ground, Manchester	Sri Lanka by 3 wickets
WT20I 2895	27 June	Netherlands	Pakistan	Bristol County Ground, Bristol	Pakistan by 37 runs
WT20I 2899	27 June	Ireland	West Indies	Bristol County Ground, Bristol	Ireland by 6 wickets
WT20I 2900	27 June	England	New Zealand	The Oval, London	England by 9 wickets
WT20I 2904	28 June	Bangladesh	South Africa	Lord's, London	South Africa by 4 wickets
WT20I 2907	28 June	Australia	India	Lord's, London	Australia by 6 wickets
Semi-finals
No.	Date	Team 1	Team 2	Venue	Result
WT20I 2908	30 June	Australia	West Indies	The Oval, London	Australia by 8 wickets
WT20I 2909	2 July	England	South Africa	The Oval, London	England by 40 runs
Final
No.	Date	Team 1	Team 2	Venue	Result
WT20I 2910	5 July	England	Australia	Lord's, London	Australia by 7 wickets

=== India in Ireland ===
T20I series
No.	Date	Venue	Result
T20I 3993	26 June	Stormont Cricket Ground, Belfast	Ireland by 34 runs
T20I 4004	28 June	Stormont Cricket Ground, Belfast	Ireland by 1 run

=== Bangladesh in Zimbabwe ===
Test match
No.	Date	Venue	Result
Test 2625	28 June–2 July	Harare Sports Club, Harare	Zimbabwe by an innings and 85 runs
ODI series
No.	Date	Venue	Result
ODI 4982	6 July	Harare Sports Club, Harare	Zimbabwe by 25 runs
ODI 4983	9 July	Harare Sports Club, Harare	Zimbabwe by 13 runs
ODI 4984	11 July	Harare Sports Club, Harare	Bangladesh by 7 wickets
T20I series
No.	Date	Venue	Result
T20I 4036	15 July	Queens Sports Club, Bulawayo	Zimbabwe by 32 runs
T20I 4037	17 July	Queens Sports Club, Bulawayo	Bangladesh by 34 runs
T20I 4038	19 July	Queens Sports Club, Bulawayo	Bangladesh by 4 wickets

== July ==
=== India in England ===
T20I series
No.	Date	Venue	Result
T20I 4007	1 July	Riverside Ground, Chester-le-Street	No result
T20I 4012	4 July	Old Trafford Cricket Ground, Manchester	England by 4 wickets
T20I 4013	7 July	Trent Bridge, Nottingham	England by 125 runs
T20I 4020	9 July	Bristol County Ground, Bristol	England by 9 wickets
T20I 4025	11 July	Rose Bowl, Southampton	England by 56 runs
ODI series
No.	Date	Venue	Result
ODI 4987	14 July	Edgbaston Cricket Ground, Birmingham	India by 6 wickets
ODI 4988	16 July	Sophia Gardens, Cardiff	England by 4 wickets
ODI 4990	19 July	Lord's, London	England by 27 runs

=== West Indies women in Ireland ===
2025–2029 ICC Women's Championship — WODI series
No.	Date	Venue	Result
WODI 1551	10 July	Bready Cricket Club Ground, Bready	West Indies by 9 wickets
WODI 1552	12 July	Bready Cricket Club Ground, Bready	West Indies by 6 wickets
WODI 1553	15 July	Bready Cricket Club Ground, Bready	West Indies by 64 runs

=== New Zealand in the West Indies ===
ODI series
No.	Date	Venue	Result
ODI 4985	11 July	Providence Stadium, Georgetown	West Indies by 7 wickets
ODI 4986	13 July	Providence Stadium, Georgetown	New Zealand by 5 wickets
ODI 4989	16 July	Providence Stadium, Georgetown	New Zealand by 6 wickets
ODI 4991	19 July	Kensington Oval, Bridgetown	New Zealand by 1 wicket
ODI 4993	21 July	Kensington Oval, Bridgetown	West Indies by 2 wickets

=== 2026 Netherlands Tri-Nation Series (round 20) ===
2024–2026 Cricket World Cup League 2 – Tri-series
No.	Date	Team 1	Team 2	Venue	Result
ODI 4992	21 July	Namibia	Nepal	Sportpark Maarschalkerweerd, Utrecht	Namibia by 8 wickets
ODI 4994	23 July	Netherlands	Nepal	Sportpark Maarschalkerweerd, Utrecht	Netherlands by 6 wickets
ODI 4995	25 July	Netherlands	Namibia	Sportpark Maarschalkerweerd, Utrecht	Netherlands by 58 runs
ODI 4996	27 July	Namibia	Nepal	Sportpark Maarschalkerweerd, Utrecht	Namibia by 3 runs
ODI 4997	29 July	Netherlands	Nepal	Sportpark Maarschalkerweerd, Utrecht	Netherlands by 57 runs
ODI 4998	31 July	Netherlands	Namibia	Sportpark Maarschalkerweerd, Utrecht	Namibia by 6 wickets

=== Pakistan women in Sri Lanka ===
2025–2029 ICC Women's Championship — WODI series
No.	Date	Venue	Result
WODI 1554	23 July	Mahinda Rajapaksa International Cricket Stadium, Hambantota	Pakistan by 5 wickets
WODI 1555	25 July	Mahinda Rajapaksa International Cricket Stadium, Hambantota	Sri Lanka by 8 wickets
WODI 1556	28 July	Mahinda Rajapaksa International Cricket Stadium, Hambantota	Sri Lanka by 8 wickets
WT20I series
No.	Date	Venue	Result
WT20I 2943	31 July	Rangiri Dambulla International Stadium, Dambulla	Sri Lanka by 6 wickets
WT20I 2948	2 August	Rangiri Dambulla International Stadium, Dambulla	Sri Lanka by 6 wickets
WT20I 2951	4 August	Rangiri Dambulla International Stadium, Dambulla	Pakistan by 4 wickets

=== India in Zimbabwe ===
T20I series
No.	Date	Venue	Result
T20I 4039	23 July	Harare Sports Club, Harare	India by 7 wickets
T20I 4041	25 July	Harare Sports Club, Harare	India by 90 runs
T20I 4044	26 July	Harare Sports Club, Harare	India by 35 runs

=== Pakistan in the West Indies ===
2025–2027 ICC World Test Championship – Test series
No.	Date	Venue	Result
Test 2627	25–29 July	Brian Lara Cricket Academy, Trinidad and Tobago	West Indies by 90 runs
Test 2628	2–6 August	Queen's Park Oval, Trinidad and Tobago	Pakistan by 8 wickets

== August ==
=== 2026 Scotland Tri-Nation Series (round 21) ===
2024–2026 Cricket World Cup League 2 – Tri-series
No.	Date	Team 1	Team 2	Venue	Result
ODI 4998a	3 August	Scotland	United Arab Emirates	Forthill, Dundee	Match abandoned
ODI 4998c	5 August	Canada	United Arab Emirates	Forthill, Dundee	Match abandoned
ODI 5000	7 August	Scotland	Canada	Forthill, Dundee	Scotland by 9 runs
ODI 5001	9 August	Scotland	United Arab Emirates	Forthill, Dundee	Scotland by 1 wicket
ODI 5003	11 August	Canada	United Arab Emirates	Forthill, Dundee	United Arab Emirates by 97 runs
ODI 5005	13 August	Scotland	Canada	Forthill, Dundee	Scotland by 170 runs

=== Afghanistan in Ireland ===
ODI series
No.	Date	Venue	Result
ODI 4998b	5 August	Bready Cricket Club Ground, Magheramason	Match abandoned
ODI 4999	7 August	Bready Cricket Club Ground, Magheramason	Afghanistan by 92 runs
ODI 5002	10 August	Stormont Cricket Ground, Belfast	Afghanistan by 3 wickets
ODI 5004	12 August	Stormont Cricket Ground, Belfast	Afghanistan by 42 runs
ODI 5006	15 August	Stormont Cricket Ground, Belfast	Afghanistan by 6 wickets

=== 2026 Cricket World Cup Challenge League B (Tanzania) ===
2024–2026 ICC Cricket World Cup Challenge League – List A series
No.	Date	Team 1	Team 2	Venue	Result
1st Match	8 August	Tanzania	Uganda	University of Dar es Salaam Ground 1, Dar es Salaam	Uganda by 90 runs (DLS)
2nd Match	9 August	Bahrain	Italy	University of Dar es Salaam Ground 1, Dar es Salaam	Italy by 68 runs
3rd Match	9 August	Hong Kong	Singapore	University of Dar es Salaam Ground 2, Dar es Salaam	Hong Kong by 163 runs
4th Match	11 August	Tanzania	Hong Kong	University of Dar es Salaam Ground 1, Dar es Salaam	Hong Kong by 6 wickets
5th Match	11 August	Italy	Uganda	University of Dar es Salaam Ground 2, Dar es Salaam	Italy by 113 runs
6th Match	12 August	Bahrain	Singapore	University of Dar es Salaam Ground 1, Dar es Salaam	Bahrain by 7 wickets
7th Match	12 August	Hong Kong	Uganda	University of Dar es Salaam Ground 2, Dar es Salaam	Hong Kong by 51 runs
8th Match	14 August	Bahrain	Hong Kong	University of Dar es Salaam Ground 1, Dar es Salaam	Hong Kong by 38 runs
9th Match	14 August	Italy	Singapore	University of Dar es Salaam Ground 2, Dar es Salaam	Italy by 7 wickets
10th Match	15 August	Singapore	Uganda	University of Dar es Salaam Ground 1, Dar es Salaam	Uganda by 8 wickets
11th Match	15 August	Tanzania	Bahrain	University of Dar es Salaam Ground 2, Dar es Salaam	Tanzania by 5 wickets
12th Match	17 August	Hong Kong	Italy	University of Dar es Salaam Ground 1, Dar es Salaam	Italy by 6 wickets
13th Match	17 August	Tanzania	Singapore	University of Dar es Salaam Ground 2, Dar es Salaam	Tanzania by 9 wickets
14th Match	18 August	Tanzania	Italy	University of Dar es Salaam Ground 1, Dar es Salaam	Italy by 8 wickets
15th Match	18 August	Bahrain	Uganda	University of Dar es Salaam Ground 2, Dar es Salaam	Bahrain by 4 wickets

=== Thailand women in Papua New Guinea ===
WT20I series
No.	Date	Venue	Result
WT20I 2952	10 August	Amini Park, Port Moresby	Papua New Guinea by 5 wickets
WT20I 2953	11 August	Amini Park, Port Moresby	Thailand by 6 wickets
WODI series
No.	Date	Venue	Result
WODI 1557	13 August	Amini Park, Port Moresby	Thailand by 121 runs
WODI 1558	15 August	Amini Park, Port Moresby	Thailand by 40 runs
WODI 1559	17 August	Amini Park, Port Moresby	Thailand by 5 wickets

=== Bangladesh in Australia ===
2025–2027 ICC World Test Championship – Test series
No.	Date	Venue	Result
Test 2629	13–16 August	Marrara Oval, Darwin	Bangladesh by 9 wickets
Test 2632	22–23 August	Great Barrier Reef Arena, Mackay	Australia by an innings and 51 runs

=== India in Sri Lanka ===
2025–2027 ICC World Test Championship – Test series
No.	Date	Venue	Result
Test 2630	15–19 August	Galle International Stadium, Galle	India by 165 runs
Test 2633	23–27 August	Sinhalese Sports Club Cricket Ground, Colombo	Match drawn

=== Pakistan in England ===
2025–2027 ICC World Test Championship – Test series
No.	Date	Venue	Result
Test 2631	19–21 August	Headingley Cricket Ground, Leeds	England by an innings and 103 runs
Test 2634	27–30 August	Lord's, London	England by 194 runs
Test 2635	9–12 September	Edgbaston Cricket Ground, Birmingham	England by 8 wickets

=== Netherlands women in Scotland ===
WODI series
No.	Date	Venue	Result
WODI 1560	28 August	Titwood, Glasgow	Netherlands by 58 runs
WODI 1561	30–31 August	New Williamfield, Stirling	Scotland by 9 wickets
WODI 1561a	1 September	New Williamfield, Stirling	Match abandoned

=== 2026 Namibia T20I Tri-Nation Series ===
Pos	Team	Pld	W	L	NR	Pts	NRR	Qualification
1	South Africa	4	3	1	0	6	1.232	Advanced to the final
2	Zimbabwe	4	2	2	0	4	−1.002	Advanced to the final
3	Namibia	4	1	3	0	2	−0.226	Eliminated

Source: Cricinfo

Round-robin
No.	Date	Team 1	Team 2	Venue	Result
T20I 4097	28 August	Namibia	South Africa	Namibia Cricket Ground, Windhoek	Namibia by 18 runs
T20I 4098	29 August	South Africa	Zimbabwe	Namibia Cricket Ground, Windhoek	South Africa by 7 wickets
T20I 4099	31 August	Namibia	Zimbabwe	Namibia Cricket Ground, Windhoek	Zimbabwe by 5 runs
T20I 4100	1 September	South Africa	Zimbabwe	Namibia Cricket Ground, Windhoek	South Africa by 43 runs
T20I 4101	3 September	Namibia	Zimbabwe	Namibia Cricket Ground, Windhoek	Zimbabwe by 5 wickets
T20I 4102	4 September	Namibia	South Africa	Namibia Cricket Ground, Windhoek	South Africa by 11 runs
Final
T20I 4103	6 September	South Africa	Zimbabwe	Namibia Cricket Ground, Windhoek	South Africa by 48 runs

=== 2026 Women's T20 Asia Cup ===
Group A standings
Pos	Team	Pld	W	L	NR	Pts	NRR	Qualification
1	India	3	3	0	0	6	5.471	Advanced to the knockout stage
2	Pakistan	3	2	1	0	4	0.927	Advanced to the knockout stage
3	Thailand	3	1	2	0	2	−2.050	Eliminated
4	Hong Kong	3	0	3	0	0	−3.583	Eliminated

Source: Cricinfo

Group B standings
Pos	Team	Pld	W	L	NR	Pts	NRR	Qualification
1	Sri Lanka	3	3	0	0	6	2.730	Advanced to the knockout stage
2	Bangladesh	3	2	1	0	4	1.688	Advanced to the knockout stage
3	United Arab Emirates (H)	3	1	2	0	2	−1.158	Eliminated
4	Indonesia	3	0	3	0	0	−3.169	Eliminated

Source: Cricinfo
(H) Hosts

Group stage
No.	Date	Team 1	Team 2	Venue	Result
WT20I 2976	28 August	Hong Kong	Thailand	Dubai International Cricket Stadium, Dubai	Thailand by 6 runs
WT20I 2982	29 August	United Arab Emirates	Sri Lanka	Dubai International Cricket Stadium, Dubai	Sri Lanka by 9 wickets
WT20I 2986	30 August	India	Thailand	Dubai International Cricket Stadium, Dubai	India by 94 runs
WT20I 2987	31 August	Bangladesh	Indonesia	Dubai International Cricket Stadium, Dubai	Bangladesh by 71 runs
WT20I 2988	1 September	Pakistan	Thailand	Dubai International Cricket Stadium, Dubai	Pakistan by 35 runs
WT20I 2989	2 September	Indonesia	Sri Lanka	Dubai International Cricket Stadium, Dubai	Sri Lanka by 75 runs
WT20I 2990	3 September	Hong Kong	India	Dubai International Cricket Stadium, Dubai	India by 137 runs
WT20I 2996	4 September	United Arab Emirates	Indonesia	Dubai International Cricket Stadium, Dubai	United Arab Emirates by 6 wickets
WT20I 3002	5 September	India	Pakistan	Dubai International Cricket Stadium, Dubai	India by 7 wickets
WT20I 3007	6 September	Bangladesh	Sri Lanka	Dubai International Cricket Stadium, Dubai	Sri Lanka by 4 wickets
WT20I 3008	7 September	Hong Kong	Pakistan	Dubai International Cricket Stadium, Dubai	Pakistan by 72 runs
WT20I 3009	8 September	United Arab Emirates	Bangladesh	Dubai International Cricket Stadium, Dubai	Bangladesh by 34 runs
Semi-finals
WT20I 3010	10 September	Bangladesh	India	Dubai International Cricket Stadium, Dubai	India by 40 runs
WT20I 3012	11 September	Pakistan	Sri Lanka	Dubai International Cricket Stadium, Dubai	Sri Lanka by 4 wickets
Final
WT20I 3016	13 September	India	Sri Lanka	Dubai International Cricket Stadium, Dubai	India by 72 runs

=== 2026 ACC Men's Premier Cup ===
Group A standings
Pos	Team	Pld	W	L	NR	Pts	NRR	Qualification
1	Nepal	4	3	1	0	6	1.531	Advanced to the knockout stage
2	Hong Kong	4	3	1	0	6	−0.005	Advanced to the knockout stage
3	Malaysia (H)	4	2	2	0	4	0.568	Eliminated
4	Saudi Arabia	4	1	3	0	2	−0.696	Eliminated
5	Bahrain	4	1	3	0	2	−1.188	Eliminated

Source: Cricinfo
(H) Hosts

Group B standings
Pos	Team	Pld	W	L	NR	Pts	NRR	Qualification
1	United Arab Emirates	4	4	0	0	8	1.979	Advanced to the knockout stage
2	Oman	4	2	2	0	4	0.649	Advanced to the knockout stage
3	Qatar	4	2	2	0	4	0.227	Eliminated
4	Kuwait	4	2	2	0	4	0.152	Eliminated
5	Singapore	4	0	4	0	0	−3.241	Eliminated

Source: Cricinfo

Group stage
No.	Date	Team 1	Team 2	Venue	Result
1st Match	30 August	Oman	Singapore	Bayuemas Oval, Kuala Lumpur	Oman by 131 runs
2nd Match	30 August	Hong Kong	Saudi Arabia	UKM-YSD Cricket Oval, Bangi	Hong Kong by 16 runs
3rd Match	31 August	Qatar	United Arab Emirates	Bayuemas Oval, Kuala Lumpur	United Arab Emirates by 92 runs
4th Match	31 August	Bahrain	Nepal	UKM-YSD Cricket Oval, Bangi	Nepal by 7 wickets
5th Match	1 September	Malaysia	Saudi Arabia	Bayuemas Oval, Kuala Lumpur	Malaysia by 93 runs
6th Match	1 September	Kuwait	Singapore	UKM-YSD Cricket Oval, Bangi	Kuwait by 160 runs (DLS)
7th Match	2 September	Bahrain	Hong Kong	Bayuemas Oval, Kuala Lumpur	Bahrain by 32 runs
8th Match	2 September	Oman	Qatar	UKM-YSD Cricket Oval, Bangi	Oman by 5 wickets
9th Match	3 September	Kuwait	United Arab Emirates	Bayuemas Oval, Kuala Lumpur	United Arab Emirates by 66 runs (DLS)
10th Match	3 September	Malaysia	Nepal	UKM-YSD Cricket Oval, Bangi	Nepal by 6 wickets
11th Match	4 September	Singapore	Qatar	Bayuemas Oval, Kuala Lumpur	Qatar by 8 wickets
12th Match	4 September	Bahrain	Saudi Arabia	UKM-YSD Cricket Oval, Bangi	Saudi Arabia by 17 runs
13th Match	5 September	Kuwait	Oman	Bayuemas Oval, Kuala Lumpur	Kuwait by 4 wickets
14th Match	5 September	Malaysia	Hong Kong	UKM-YSD Cricket Oval, Bangi	Match tied (Hong Kong won S/O)
15th Match	6 September	Nepal	Saudi Arabia	Bayuemas Oval, Kuala Lumpur	Nepal by 5 wickets
16th Match	6 September	Singapore	United Arab Emirates	UKM-YSD Cricket Oval, Bangi	United Arab Emirates by 7 wickets
17th Match	7 September	Malaysia	Bahrain	Bayuemas Oval, Kuala Lumpur	Malaysia by 126 runs
18th Match	7 September	Kuwait	Qatar	UKM-YSD Cricket Oval, Bangi	Qatar by 4 wickets
19th Match	8 September	Hong Kong	Nepal	Bayuemas Oval, Kuala Lumpur	Hong Kong by 15 runs
ODI 5007	8 September	Oman	United Arab Emirates	UKM-YSD Cricket Oval, Bangi	United Arab Emirates by 49 runs
Semi-finals
ODI 5009	10 September	Nepal	Oman	Bayuemas Oval, Kuala Lumpur	Nepal by 87 runs
22nd Match	10 September	Hong Kong	United Arab Emirates	UKM-YSD Cricket Oval, Bangi	United Arab Emirates by 7 wickets
3rd place play-off
23rd Match	12 September	Hong Kong	Oman	UKM-YSD Cricket Oval, Bangi	Hong Kong by 9 wickets
Final
ODI 5011	12 September	Nepal	United Arab Emirates	Bayuemas Oval, Kuala Lumpur	Nepal by 44 runs

== September ==
=== Ireland women in England ===
2025–2029 ICC Women's Championship — WODI series
No.	Date	Venue	Result
WODI 1562	1 September	Grace Road, Leicester	England by 6 wickets
WODI 1563	3 September	County Ground, Derby	England by 6 wickets
WODI 1564	6 September	New Road, Worcester	England by 114 runs

=== South Africa in Namibia ===
ODI series
No.	Date	Venue	Result
ODI 5008	9 September	Namibia Cricket Ground, Windhoek	South Africa by 99 runs (DLS)
ODI 5010	11 September	Namibia Cricket Ground, Windhoek	South Africa by 157 runs
ODI 5012	13 September	Namibia Cricket Ground, Windhoek	South Africa by 9 wickets

=== South Africa women in Zimbabwe ===
WT20I series
No.	Date	Venue	Result
WT20I 3011	11 September	Queens Sports Club, Bulawayo	South Africa by 6 wickets
WT20I 3015	13 September	Queens Sports Club, Bulawayo	South Africa by 64 runs
WT20I 3017	15 September	Queens Sports Club, Bulawayo	South Africa by 80 runs
WT20I 3019	17 September	Queens Sports Club, Bulawayo	South Africa by 80 runs
WT20I 3022	19 September	Queens Sports Club, Bulawayo	South Africa by 14 runs

=== India against Afghanistan in India ===
T20I series
No.	Date	Venue	Result
T20I 4116	13 September	Arun Jaitley Cricket Stadium, New Delhi	India by 7 wickets
T20I 4120	15 September	Arun Jaitley Cricket Stadium, New Delhi	India by 7 wickets
T20I 4128	17 September	Arun Jaitley Cricket Stadium, New Delhi	India by 127 runs

=== Australia in Zimbabwe ===
ODI series
No.	Date	Venue	Result
ODI 5013	15 September	Harare Sports Club, Harare	Australia by 59 runs
ODI 5014	18 September	Harare Sports Club, Harare	Australia by 84 runs
ODI 5015	20 September	Harare Sports Club, Harare	Australia by 1 wicket

=== Sri Lanka in England ===
T20I series
No.	Date	Venue	Result
T20I 4121	15 September	Rose Bowl, Southampton	England by 119 runs
T20I 4129	17 September	Sophia Gardens, Cardiff	England by 6 wickets
T20I 4134	19 September	Old Trafford Cricket Ground, Manchester	England by 8 wickets
ODI series
No.	Date	Venue	Result
ODI 5016	22 September	Riverside Ground, Chester-le-Street	England by 89 runs
ODI 5018	24 September	Headingley Cricket Ground, Leeds	Sri Lanka by 16 runs
ODI 5021	27 September	The Oval, London	England by 223 runs

=== 2026 Asian Games ===
==== Women's Tournament ====
Quarter-finals
No.	Date	Team 1	Team 2	Venue	Result
WT20I 3017a	17 September	Bangladesh	China	Kōrogi Sports Park, Nisshin	Match abandoned
WT20I 3018	17 September	Pakistan	Thailand	Kōrogi Sports Park, Nisshin	Pakistan by 3 wickets
WT20I 3020	18 September	Malaysia	Sri Lanka	Kōrogi Sports Park, Nisshin	Sri Lanka by 86 runs
WT20I 3021	18 September	Japan	India	Kōrogi Sports Park, Nisshin	India by 8 wickets
Semi-finals
WT20I 3023	20 September	Pakistan	Sri Lanka	Kōrogi Sports Park, Nisshin	Sri Lanka by 8 wickets
WT20I 3024	20 September	Bangladesh	India	Kōrogi Sports Park, Nisshin	India by 114 runs
3rd-place play-off
WT20I 3025	22 September	Bangladesh	Pakistan	Kōrogi Sports Park, Nisshin	Pakistan by 31 runs
Final
WT20I 3026	22 September	India	Sri Lanka	Kōrogi Sports Park, Nisshin	India by 147 runs

==== Men's Tournament ====
Pos	Team	Pld	W	L	T	NR	Pts	NRR	Qualification
1	Nepal	2	1	0	0	1	3	0.842	Advanced to the knockout stage
2	Afghanistan	2	1	1	0	0	2	0.846	Advanced to the knockout stage
3	Japan (H)	2	0	1	0	1	1	−2.400	Eliminated

Source: Cricinfo
(H) Host

Pos	Team	Pld	W	L	T	NR	Pts	NRR	Qualification
1	Malaysia	2	1	0	0	1	3	2.950	Advanced to the knockout stage
2	Hong Kong	2	1	1	0	0	2	−0.075	Advanced to the knockout stage
3	Oman	2	0	1	0	1	1	−2.050	Eliminated

Source: Cricinfo

Group stage
No.	Date	Team 1	Team 2	Venue	Result
T20I 4140	24 September	Japan	Afghanistan	Kōrogi Sports Park, Nisshin	Afghanistan by 48 runs
T20I 4141	24 September	Hong Kong	Malaysia	Kōrogi Sports Park, Nisshin	Malaysia by 8 wickets
T20I 4144	25 September	Hong Kong	Oman	Kōrogi Sports Park, Nisshin	Hong Kong by 41 runs
T20I 4145	25 September	Afghanistan	Nepal	Kōrogi Sports Park, Nisshin	Nepal by 5 wickets
T20I 4147	26 September	Japan	Nepal	Kōrogi Sports Park, Nisshin	No result
T20I 4147a	26 September	Malaysia	Oman	Kōrogi Sports Park, Nisshin	Match abandoned
Quarter-finals
T20I 4151a	28 September	Hong Kong	Pakistan	Kōrogi Sports Park, Nisshin	Match abandoned
T20I 4151b	28 September	Afghanistan	India	Kōrogi Sports Park, Nisshin	Match abandoned
T20I 4151c	29 September	Nepal	Sri Lanka	Kōrogi Sports Park, Nisshin	Match abandoned
T20I 4151d	29 September	Bangladesh	Malaysia	Kōrogi Sports Park, Nisshin	Match abandoned
Semi-finals
T20I 4152	1 October	Bangladesh	Pakistan	Kōrogi Sports Park, Nisshin	Pakistan by 6 wickets
T20I 4153	1 October	India	Sri Lanka	Kōrogi Sports Park, Nisshin	India by 124 runs
3rd-place play-off
T20I 4154	3 October	Bangladesh	Sri Lanka	Kōrogi Sports Park, Nisshin	Sri Lanka by 63 runs
Final
T20I 4156	3 October	India	Pakistan	Kōrogi Sports Park, Nisshin	India by 19 runs

=== India in Japan ===
Suzuki Cup (T20I match)
No.	Date	Venue	Result
T20I 4136	22 September	Sano International Cricket Ground, Sano	India by 2 runs

== See also ==
- Associate international cricket in 2026
- International cricket in 2025–26
- International cricket in 2026–27
