= List of 2023 SA20 auction and personnel signings =

This is a list of auction and personnel signings for the 2022–23 SA20 cricket tournament.

== Team auction ==
Cricket South Africa held an auction for six team franchises. The exact price of the franchises has not been publicly declared, but all franchisees were sold to Indian corporations. All corporations also operate an IPL franchise.

Team	City	Franchise owner
Durban's Super Giants	Durban	RPSG Group
Joburg Super Kings	Johannesburg	India Cements
MI Cape Town	Cape Town	Reliance Strategic Business Ventures Limited
Paarl Royals	Paarl	Royals Sports Group
Pretoria Capitals	Pretoria	JSW Group
Sunrisers Eastern Cape	Gqeberha	SUN Group

== Player auction ==
Over 500 players registered their interest to participate in the league. The list was cut down to 318 after all teams submitted shortlists.

Since this was the first edition of the tournament, there were no retentions or transfers. Each franchise had a salary budget of R34 million (US$2.3 million) to create its squad.

Base prices were set as follows:

- Star overseas players: R1.7 million (US$115,020.3)
- Other overseas players: between R 425,000 and R850,000 (US$57,510.15)
- South African national team players: R850,000 (US$57,510.15)
- Other South African players: R175,000 (US$11,840.32)

Each team could only have a maximum of 17 players in their squad and was allowed a maximum of seven overseas players. The auction was held on 19 September 2022 at the Cape Town International Convention Centre.

=== Pre-auction picks ===
Teams were given an option to select up to five players in a pre-auction.

Durban's Super Giants
Name	National team	Notes
Quinton de Kock	South Africa	Captain
Jason Holder	West Indies	
Kyle Mayers	West Indies	
Reece Topley	England	
Prenelan Subrayen	South Africa	

Joburg Super Kings
Name	National team	Notes
Faf du Plessis	South Africa	Captain
Moeen Ali	England	
Maheesh Theekshana	Sri Lanka	
Romario Shepherd	West Indies	
Gerald Coetzee	South Africa	

MI Cape Town
Name	National team	Notes
Rashid Khan	Afghanistan	Captain
Kagiso Rabada	South Africa	
Dewald Brevis	South Africa	
Sam Curran	England	
Liam Livingstone	England	

Paarl Royals
Name	National team	Notes
David Miller	South Africa	Captain
Jos Buttler	England	
Obed McCoy	West Indies	
Corbin Bosch	South Africa	

Pretoria Capitals
Name	National team	Notes
Anrich Nortje	South Africa	
Migael Pretorius	South Africa	

Sunrisers Eastern Cape
Name	National team	Notes
Aiden Markram	South Africa	Captain
Ottniel Baartman	South Africa	

=== Auction results ===
Name	!National team	Playing role	Price (in ZAR)	Team
Heinrich Klaasen	South Africa	Wicketkeeper	4,500,000	Durban's Super Giants
James Neesham	New Zealand	Allrounder	3,600,000	Pretoria Capitals
Rassie van der Dussen	South Africa	Batsman	3,900,000	MI Cape Town
Odean Smith	West Indies	Bowler	1,700,000	MI Cape Town
Tabraiz Shamsi	South Africa	Bowler	4,300,000	Paarl Royals
Dwaine Pretorius	South Africa	Allrounder	4,100,000	Durban's Super Giants
Lungisani Ngidi	South Africa	Bowler	3,400,000	Paarl Royals
Marco Jansen	South Africa	Allrounder	6,100,000	Sunrisers Eastern Cape
Tristan Stubbs	South Africa	Batsman	9,300,000	Sunrisers Eastern Cape
Janneman Malan	South Africa	Batsman	2,700,000	Joburg Super Kings
Rilee Rossouw	South Africa	Batsman	6,900,000	Pretoria Capitals
Jason Roy	England	Batsman	1,500,000	Paarl Royals
Reeza Hendricks	South Africa	Batsman	4,500,000	Joburg Super Kings
Harry Brook	England	Batsman	2,100,000	Joburg Super Kings
Eoin Morgan	England	Batsman	2,000,000	Paarl Royals
Phil Salt	England	Wicketkeeper	2,000,000	Pretoria Capitals
Kyle Verreynne	South Africa	Wicketkeeper	175,000	Joburg Super Kings
Kusal Mendis	Sri Lanka	Wicketkeeper	425,000	Pretoria Capitals
Dane Vilas	South Africa	Wicketkeeper	3,300,000	Paarl Royals
Ryan Rickelton	South Africa	Wicketkeeper	1,000,000	MI Cape Town
Peter Handscomb	Australia	Wicketkeeper		Withdrew
Keshav Maharaj	South Africa	Allrounder	2,500,000	Durban's Super Giants
Sisanda Magala	South Africa	Allrounder	5,400,000	Sunrisers Eastern Cape
Wayne Parnell	South Africa	Allrounder	5,600,000	Pretoria Capitals
Keemo Paul	West Indies	Allrounder	850,000	Durban's Super Giants
Brydon Carse	England	Allrounder	425,000	Sunrisers Eastern Cape
George Linde	South Africa	Allrounder	3,900,000	MI Cape Town
George Garton	England	Allrounder	425,000	Joburg Super Kings
Alzarri Joseph	West Indies	Bowler	2,100,000	Joburg Super Kings
Kyle Abbott	South Africa	Bowler	175,000	Durban's Super Giants
Josh Little	Ireland	Bowler	1,500,000	Pretoria Capitals
Beuran Hendricks	South Africa	Bowler	275,000	MI Cape Town
Adil Rashid	England	Bowler	2,400,000	Pretoria Capitals
Mason Crane	England	Bowler	425,000	Sunrisers Eastern Cape
Junaid Dawood	South Africa	Bowler	375,000	Sunrisers Eastern Cape
Bjorn Fortuin	South Africa	Bowler	1,500,000	Paarl Royals
Shaun von Berg	South Africa	Bowler	325,000	Pretoria Capitals
Simon Harmer	South Africa	Bowler	200,000	Durban's Super Giants
Will Jacks	England	Batsman	1,100,000	Pretoria Capitals
Cameron Delport	South Africa	Batsman	800,000	Pretoria Capitals
Sarel Erwee	South Africa	Batsman	175,000	Sunrisers Eastern Cape
Jacobus Leus du Plooy	South Africa	Batsman	1,500,000	Joburg Super Kings
Theunis de Bruyn	South Africa	Batsman	1,000,000	Pretoria Capitals
Jon-Jon Smuts	South Africa	Allrounder	2,300,000	Sunrisers Eastern Cape
Lewis Gregory	England	Allrounder	850,000	Joburg Super Kings
Duan Jansen	South Africa	Allrounder	3,300,000	MI Cape Town
Wiaan Mulder	South Africa	Allrounder	1,900,000	Durban's Super Giants
Lizaad Williams	South Africa	Bowler	325,000	Joburg Super Kings
Daryn Dupavillon	South Africa	Bowler	1,700,000	Pretoria Capitals
Tom Abell	England	Bowler	850,000	Sunrisers Eastern Cape
Junior Dala	South Africa	Bowler	175,000	Durban's Super Giants
Olly Stone	England	Bowler	850,000	MI Cape Town
Jordan Cox	England	Wicketkeeper	325,000	Sunrisers Eastern Cape
Caleb Seleka	South Africa	Bowler	175,000	Joburg Super Kings
Dilshan Madushanka	Sri Lanka	Bowler	275,000	Durban's Super Giants
Grant Roelofsen	South Africa	Wicketkeeper	175,000	MI Cape Town
Johnson Charles	West Indies	Wicketkeeper	425,000	Durban's Super Giants
Adam Rossington	England	Wicketkeeper	425,000	Sunrisers Eastern Cape
Waqar Salamkheil	Afghanistan	Bowler	175,000	MI Cape Town
Nandre Burger	South Africa	Bowler	175,000	Joburg Super Kings
Ziyaad Abrahams	South Africa	Bowler	175,000	MI Cape Town
Donavon Ferreira	South Africa	Batsman	5,500,000	Joburg Super Kings
Matthew Breetzke	South Africa	Batsman	175,000	Durban's Super Giants
Mitchell Van Buuren	South Africa	Batsman	175,000	Paarl Royals
Wesley Marshall	South Africa	Batsman	175,000	MI Cape Town
Wihan Lubbe	South Africa	Batsman	350,000	Paarl Royals
Marco Marais	South Africa	Batsman	175,000	Pretoria Capitals
Delano Potgieter	South Africa	Allrounder	175,000	Sunrisers Eastern Cape
Ayabulela Gqamane	South Africa	Allrounder	175,000	Sunrisers Eastern Cape
Roelof van der Merwe	Netherlands	Allrounder	175,000	Sunrisers Eastern Cape
Marques Ackerman	South Africa	Batsman	175,000	Sunrisers Eastern Cape
Ferisco Adams	South Africa	Allrounder	325,000	Paarl Royals
Imran Manack	South Africa	Allrounder	175,000	Paarl Royals
Christiaan Jonker	South Africa	Allrounder	175,000	Durban's Super Giants
Codi Yusuf	South Africa	Allrounder	175,000	Paarl Royals
Eathan Bosch	South Africa	Allrounder	175,000	Pretoria Capitals
Evan Jones	South Africa	Allrounder	1,700,000	Paarl Royals
Malusi Siboto	South Africa	Allrounder	175,000	Joburg Super Kings
Shane Dadswell	South Africa	Allrounder	175,000	Pretoria Capitals
Ramon Simmonds	West Indies	Bowler	175,000	Paarl Royals
James Fuller	England	Allrounder	425,000	Sunrisers Eastern Cape

=== Wildcard picks ===
In November 2022, teams were able to sign an additional player as a wildcard. Teams were given under 31 December 2022 to pick a player. The following were the wildcard picks:

- Durban Super Giants: Akila Dananjaya
- Joburg Super Kings: Aaron Phangiso
- MI Cape Town: Jofra Archer
- Paarl Royals: Andile Phehlukwayo
- Pretoria Capitals: Senuran Muthusamy
- Sunrisers Eastern Cape: Jordan Hermann

== Mid-season signings ==
On 2 February 2023 Temba Bavuma joined Sunrisers Eastern Cape, replacing Tom Abell.
