= KwaZulu-Natal cricket team =

South african cricket team

KwaZulu-Natal (formerly Natal) is the first-class cricket team that represents the province of KwaZulu-Natal (formerly Natal) in South Africa in the CSA 4-Day Domestic Series (previously the Currie Cup). KwaZulu-Natal is the only team that did not merge with another during the 2004 restructuring, but were rebranded as the Dolphins. However, the KwaZulu-Natal Inland cricket team was granted first-class status in 2006, and began competing in the CSA Provincial Competitions in 2006-2007, and were also represented by the Dolphins franchise. The team was originally called Natal and began playing in December 1889 at the start of first-class cricket in South Africa. The team joined the Currie Cup in 1893–94. The name changed in April 1998.

== Current squad ==
Squad for 2026/27 Season. Players in bold have played international cricket.

Name	Nationality	Birth date	Batting style	Bowling style	Notes
Batters
Marques Ackerman	South Africa	1 March 1996 (age 30)	Left-handed	Right-arm orthodox spin	Player of National Interest
**David Miller**	South Africa	10 June 1989 (age 37)	Left-handed	Right-arm orthodox spin	
Romashan Pillay	South Africa	5 January 2005 (age 21)	Right-handed	Right-arm seam	
Semal Pillay	South Africa	19 February 2007 (age 19)	Left-handed		
Joshua Richards	South Africa	20 December 1998 (age 27)	Right-handed	Right-arm wrist spin	
**Jason Smith**	South Africa	11 October 1994 (age 31)	Right-handed	Right-arm seam	Player of National Interest
**Khaya Zondo**	South Africa	7 March 1990 (age 36)	Right-handed	Right-arm orthodox spin	
Wicket-keepers
Grant Roelofsen	South Africa	26 July 1996 (age 30)	Right-handed		
Gomolemo Phiri	South Africa		Right-handed		High-performance Contract
Hanu Viljoen	South Africa	5 June 2001 (age 25)	Right-handed		
Ntando Zuma	South Africa	15 December 2004 (age 21)	Right-handed		High-performance Contract
All-rounders
Sean Gilson	South Africa	16 April 1999 (age 27)	Left-handed	Left-arm orthodox spin	High-performance Contract
Bandile Mbatha	South Africa	19 September 2006 (age 19)	Right-handed	Right-arm seam	High-performance Contract
Bryce Parsons	South Africa	13 February 2001 (age 25)	Left-handed	Left-arm orthodox spin	
Timothy Saulez	South Africa		Right-handed	Right-arm seam	High-performance Contract
**Andile Simelane**	South Africa	3 June 2003 (age 23)	Right-handed	Right-arm seam	
Bowlers
**Ottniel Baartman**	South Africa	18 March 1993 (age 33)	Right-handed	Right-arm seam	National Contract
Okuhle Cele	South Africa	9 July 1997 (age 29)	Right-handed	Right-arm seam	Player of National Interest
Keith Dudgeon	South Africa	7 November 1995 (age 30)	Right-handed	Right-arm seam	
Tristan Luus	South Africa	25 June 2005 (age 21)	Right-handed	Right-arm seam	
**Keshav Maharaj**	South Africa	7 February 1990 (age 36)	Right-handed	Left-arm orthodox spin	National Contract
Bayanda Majola	South Africa	8 January 2007 (age 19)	Left-handed	Right-arm seam	
**Nqobani Mokoena**	South Africa	5 January 2006 (age 20)	Right-handed	Right-arm seam	Player of National Interest
**Prenelan Subrayen**	South Africa	23 September 1993 (age 32)	Right-handed	Right-arm orthodox spin	Player of National Interest

== Honours ==
- Currie Cup (21) - 1910–11, 1912–13, 1933–34, 1936–37, 1946–47, 1947–48, 1951–52, 1954–55, 1959–60, 1960–61, 1962–63, 1963–64, 1966–67, 1967–68, 1973–74, 1975–76, 1976–77, 1980–81, 1994–95, 1996–97, 2001–02; shared (3) - 1921–22, 1937–38, 1965–66
- Standard Bank Cup (4) - 1983–84, 1996–97, 2000–01, 2001–02
- South African Airways Provincial One-Day Challenge (1) - 2006–07
- Gillette Cup/Nissan Shield (3) - 1974–75, 1976–77, 1987–88

== Venues ==
Venues have included:

- Albert Park, Durban (April 1895 – January 1906)
- City Oval, Pietermaritzburg (alternative venue April 1895 – December 2002)
- Lord's, Durban (March 1898 - April 1922)
- Kingsmead, Durban (January 1923 – present)
- Jan Smuts Stadium, Pietermaritzburg (February 1959 – December 1995)
- Settler's Park, Ladysmith (three games January 1971 – March 1973)
- Lahee Park, Pinetown (occasional venue January 1974 – December 1979)
- Alexandra Memorial Ground, Umzinto (used twice 1974 – 1977)

== Sources ==
- South African Cricket Annual – various editions
- Wisden Cricketers' Almanack – various editions
