= 2026 Namibia Tri-Nation Series =

Sixteenth tri-nation series round in 2024-26 CWCL2

- Part of 2024–2026 Cricket World Cup League 2
- Round 16
- Date: 2 – 12 April 2026
- Location: Namibia
Teams
Namibia	Oman	Scotland
Captains
JJ Smit	Jatinder Singh	Richie Berrington
Most runs
Louren Steenkamp (197)	Hammad Mirza (201)	Brandon McMullen (122)
Most wickets
Jack Brassell (6)	Hassnain Shah (9)	Jack Jarvis (7)

The 2026 Namibia Tri-Nation Series was the sixteenth round of the 2024–2026 Cricket World Cup League 2 cricket tournament which took place in Namibia from 2nd to 12th April 2026. It was a tri-nation series contested by the men's national teams of Namibia, Oman and Scotland. The matches were played as One Day International (ODI) fixtures.

After the conclusion of the League 2 series, Namibia played three Twenty20 International (T20I) matches against Scotland. Scotland won the three-match series 2–1.

== League 2 series ==
=== Squads ===
Namibia	Oman	Scotland
JJ Smit (c); Jack Brassell; Gerhard Erasmus; Jan Frylinck; Zane Green (wk); Max Heingo; Malan Kruger; Dylan Leicher; William Lottering; Willem Myburgh; Bernard Scholtz; Ben Shikongo; Louren Steenkamp; Ruben Trumpelmann; Zacheo van Vuuren	Jatinder Singh (c); Vinayak Shukla (vc, wk); Shakeel Ahmed; Mujibur Ali; Shah Faisal; Muhammed Imran; Pruthvikumar Machhi; Hammad Mirza (wk); Mohammad Nadeem; Jay Odedra; Ashish Odedara; Jiten Ramanandi; Karan Sonavale; Hassnain Shah; Samay Shrivastava	Richie Berrington (c); Matthew Cross (wk); ~~Brad Currie~~; Jasper Davidson; Oliver Davidson; Owen Gould (wk); Zainullah Ihsan; Jack Jarvis; Mackenzie Jones; Michael Leask; Christopher McBride; Finlay McCreath; Brandon McMullen; George Munsey; Safyaan Sharif; Mark Watt

Brad Currie was ruled out of Scotland's squad due to injury and was replaced by Zainullah Ihsan.

=== Fixtures ===
==== 1st ODI ====
2 April 2026
09:30
Scorecard

Oman	v	Scotland

Match abandoned
Namibia Cricket Ground, Windhoek
Umpires: Andrew Louw (Nam) and Claus Schumacher (Nam)

- No toss.
- No play was possible due to rain.

==== 2nd ODI ====
4 April 2026
09:30
Scorecard

Namibia; 268/7 (50 overs)	v	Oman; 274/7 (49.1 overs)
Gerhard Erasmus 54 (55); Hassnain Shah 3/58 (8 overs)		Hammad Mirza 112* (128); Max Heingo 3/59 (9.1 overs)

Oman won by 3 wickets
Namibia Cricket Ground, Windhoek
Umpires: Stephen Harris (SA) and Ewoud Lassen (Nam)
Player of the match: Hammad Mirza (Oma)

- Oman won the toss and elected to field.
- Max Heingo, Louren Steenkamp (Nam) and Shah Faisal (Oma) all made their ODI debuts.
- Hammad Mirza (Oma) scored his first century in ODIs.

==== 3rd ODI ====
6 April 2026
09:30
Scorecard

Namibia; 189/8 (46.4 overs)	v	Scotland
Louren Steenkamp 78 (99); Jack Jarvis 3/35 (8.4 overs)

No result
Namibia Cricket Ground, Windhoek
Umpires: Stephen Harris (SA) and Claus Schumacher (Nam)

- Scotland won the toss and elected to field.
- No further play was possible due to rain.

==== 4th ODI ====
8 April 2026
09:30
Scorecard

Oman; 163/7 (20 overs)	v	Scotland; 151/9 (20 overs)
Jatinder Singh 51 (37); Michael Leask 2/18 (4 overs)		Matthew Cross 24 (26); Hassnain Shah 4/26 (4 overs)

Oman won by 12 runs
Namibia Cricket Ground, Windhoek
Umpires: Ewoud Lassen (Nam) and Andrew Louw (Nam)
Player of the match: Hassnain Shah (Oma)

- Scotland won the toss and elected to field.
- The match was reduced to 20 overs per side due to rain.

==== 5th ODI ====
10 April 2026
09:30
Scorecard

Oman; 218/9 (50 overs)	v	Namibia; 223/9 (49.3 overs)
Hammad Mirza 81 (102); Jack Brassell 4/22 (10 overs)		Jan Frylinck 84 (93); Muhammed Imran 5/39 (10 overs)

Namibia won by 1 wicket
Namibia Cricket Ground, Windhoek
Umpires: Stephen Harris (SA) and Andrew Louw (Nam)
Player of the match: Zane Green (Nam)

- Namibia won the toss and elected to field.
- Jan Frylinck (Nam) scored his 1,000th run in ODIs.
- Muhammed Imran (Oma) took his first five-wicket haul in ODIs.

==== 6th ODI ====
12 April 2026
09:30
Scorecard

Namibia; 198 (49 overs)	v	Scotland; 199/3 (38 overs)
Louren Steenkamp 67 (99); Brandon McMullen 3/47 (8 overs)		Brandon McMullen 100* (92); Ruben Trumpelmann 2/53 (10 overs)

Scotland won by 7 wickets
Namibia Cricket Ground, Windhoek
Umpires: Stephen Harris (SA) and Claus Schumacher (Nam)
Player of the match: Brandon McMullen (Sco)

- Namibia won the toss and elected to bat.

== Scotland in Namibia ==
Scotland men's cricket team in Namibia in 2026
	Namibia	Scotland
- Dates: 15 – 18 April 2026
Captains	Gerhard Erasmus	Richie Berrington (Note: Matthew Cross captained Scotland in the final match of the series.)

Twenty20 International series
- Results: Scotland won the 3-match series 2–1
Most runs	Gerhard Erasmus (145)	George Munsey (162)
Most wickets	Jack Brassell (5)	Mackenzie Jones (5); Jasper Davidson (5)

=== Squads ===
Namibia	Scotland
Gerhard Erasmus (c); Jan Balt; Liam Basson (wk); Jack Brassell; Alexander Volschenk; Jan Frylinck; Zane Green (wk); Max Heingo; Malan Kruger; Dylan Leicher; Jan Nicol Loftie-Eaton (wk); Bernard Scholtz; Ben Shikongo; JJ Smit; Waldo Smith; Louren Steenkamp; Ruben Trumpelmann; Zacheo van Vuuren	Richie Berrington (c); Matthew Cross (wk); ~~Brad Currie~~; Jasper Davidson; Oliver Davidson; Owen Gould (wk); Zainullah Ihsan; Jack Jarvis; Mackenzie Jones; Michael Leask; Christopher McBride; Finlay McCreath; Brandon McMullen; George Munsey; Safyaan Sharif; Mark Watt

Brad Currie was ruled out of Scotland's squad due to injury and was replaced by Mackenzie Jones.

=== Fixtures ===
==== 1st T20I ====
15 April 2026
14:00
Scorecard

Namibia; 159/7 (20 overs)	v	Scotland; 160/3 (18.5 overs)
Gerhard Erasmus 54 (39); Mark Watt 2/24 (4 overs)		Brandon McMullen 44* (39); Max Heingo 2/16 (3 overs)

Scotland won by 7 wickets
Namibia Cricket Ground, Windhoek
Umpires: Iknow Chabi (Zim) and Ewoud Lassen (Nam)
Player of the match: George Munsey (Sco)

- Namibia won the toss and elected to bat.
- Zacheo van Vuuren (Nam) and Zainullah Ihsan (Sco) both made their T20I debuts.

==== 2nd T20I ====
17 April 2026
14:00
Scorecard

Scotland; 157/8 (20 overs)	v	Namibia; 138/7 (20 overs)
Jack Jarvis 32* (18); Jack Brassell 3/26 (4 overs)		Gerhard Erasmus 47 (30); Mackenzie Jones 4/22 (4 overs)

Scotland won by 19 runs
Namibia Cricket Ground, Windhoek
Umpires: Ewoud Lassen (Nam) and Percival Sizara (Zim)
Player of the match: Mackenzie Jones (Sco)

- Namibia won the toss and elected to field.
- Liam Basson (Nam) and Owen Gould (Sco) both made their T20I debuts.

==== 3rd T20I ====
18 April 2026
14:00
Scorecard

Scotland; 186/4 (20 overs)	v	Namibia; 187/6 (20 overs)
George Munsey 108 (64); Waldo Smith 2/39 (4 overs)		Jan Frylinck 78 (53); Jasper Davidson 3/51 (4 overs)

Namibia won by 4 wickets
Namibia Cricket Ground, Windhoek
Umpires: Iknow Chabi (Zim) and Ewoud Lassen (Nam)
Player of the match: Jan Frylinck (Nam)

- Scotland won the toss and elected to bat.
- Waldo Smith (Nam) made his T20I debut.
