= Donovan Ferreira =

South African cricketer (born 1998)

Personal information
- Born: 21 July 1998 (age 28); Pretoria, South Africa
- Batting: Right-handed
- Bowling: Right-arm off break
- Role: Batting all-rounder

International information
- National side: South Africa (2023–present)
- ODI debut (cap 162): 4 November 2025 v Pakistan
- Last ODI: 8 November 2025 v Pakistan
- T20I debut (cap 100): 3 September 2023 v Australia
- Last T20I: 19 December 2025 v India

Domestic team information
- Years: Team
- 2018/19–present: Northerns
- 2019/20: Tshwane Spartans
- 2020/21: Easterns
- 2022/23–present: Joburg Super Kings
- 2023: Barbados Royals
- 2024, 2026-present: Rajasthan Royals
- 2024: Yorkshire
- 2024–2025: Oval Invincibles
- 2025: Delhi Capitals
- 2025: Texas Super Kings
- 2026: Birmingham Phoenix

Career statistics
Competition	ODI	T20I	FC	LA
Matches	3	16	15	28
Runs scored	10	240	1,091	725
Batting average	5.00	18.46	49.59	34.52
100s/50s	0/0	0/0	4/4	1/4
Top score	7	48	163	138*
Balls bowled	138	106	1,820	481
Wickets	2	2	30	12
Bowling average	57.50	76.50	28.16	35.66
5 wickets in innings	0	0	1	0
10 wickets in match	0	0	1	0
Best bowling	2/53	1/13	6/38	3/53
Catches/stumpings	3/–	8/–	26/–	16/–
- Source: ESPNcricinfo, 13 September 2026

Donovan Ferreira (born 21 July 1998) is a South African international cricketer. He plays as a batting all-rounder who can also play as a wicketkeeper.

== Early life and domestic career ==
Ferreira went to school at the Pretoria Boys high-school where he played for the first cricket team. While he began playing domestic cricket in 2018, making his Twenty20 debut in the 2018 Africa T20 Cup, he had to quit cricket for a time to work full-time as a salesman. After an offer to play professionally for the Titans, he quit his job as a salesman and began to focus on cricket. He played for the Titans in all three formats of cricket: first-class cricket in the CSA 4-Day Domestic Series, List A cricket in the CSA One-Day Cup, and Twenty20 in the CSA T20 Challenge. Ferreira was appointed Titans' captain in October 2025.

== Twenty20 cricket ==
Ferreira had his breakout season in the 2022–23 summer. Playing in the 2022–23 CSA T20 Challenge, he scored 166 runs with a batting average of 83. Despite not having played international cricket, Ferreira was bought for the high price of 5.5 million rand by the Joburg Super Kings in the auction for the inaugural season of the SA20 in September 2022. In 2023 he also began playing franchise Twenty20 cricket overseas, playing for the Rajasthan Royals in the Indian Premier League and the Barbados Royals in the Caribbean Premier League, though his time with Barbados was cut short by national team duties. Since then, Ferreira has also played in the T20 Blast, The Hundred, and Major League Cricket. Ferreira gained a reputation as a power hitter in Twenty20 cricket, scoring sixes at a high frequency. In 2025, across four Twenty20 tournaments, he scored a six every 6.23 deliveries, including multiple sixes that traveled more than 100 metres.

== IPL 2026 ==
Ahead of IPL 2026, Ferreira joined Rajasthan Royals after being traded to them from Delhi Capitals.

== International career ==
Ferreira was first brought into the South African national team for their Twenty20 International series against Australia in 2023. He made his international debut in the third and final match of the series on 3 September, top-scoring for South Africa with 48 runs from 21 deliveries, including hitting a six that traveled 92 metres. South Africa went on to lose the match.

Ferreira was only selected for the national team sporadically at first, and in 2025 he was omitted from South Africa's squads for the 2025 Zimbabwe Tri-Nation Series and an August tour of Australia. He returned to the squad for a series against England in September, and was named the player of the match for his batting in the first match of the series. In September 2025, he was named the stand-in captain of South Africa's Twenty20 team for a match against Namibia due to the absence of South Africa's normal captain David Miller. Before this appointment, Ferreira had never captained a professional cricket team in any format. When Miller became injured in October 2025, Ferreira was also named as the team's captain for their following Twenty20 series against Pakistan.

On 2 Jan 2026, Ferreira was named in South Africa's squad for the 2026 Men's T20 World Cup, but his participation in the tournament was put in doubt when he suffered a shoulder injury in the 2026 SA20. He was formally replaced in the squad on 22 January 2026.

== Playing style ==
Ferreira is an aggressive batter who scores a lot of his runs from sixes. He has an ability to score runs quickly from early in his innings. Early in his career, he had a weakness against spin bowling, struggling to score runs when the ball turned away from him, but from 2023 onwards he eliminated this weakness and improved his strike rate against spin.

While Ferreira predominantly plays in the field as a wicket-keeper, he can also bowl off break spin bowling. He switched roles mid-game in a match for the Joburg Super Kings in 2025: he was initially named as the team's designated wicket-keeper and played as such at the beginning of the innings, but was brought into the bowling attack in the seventh over and took a wicket, then after his bowling spell returned to wicket-keeping duties.
