= List of South Africa Twenty20 International cricketers =

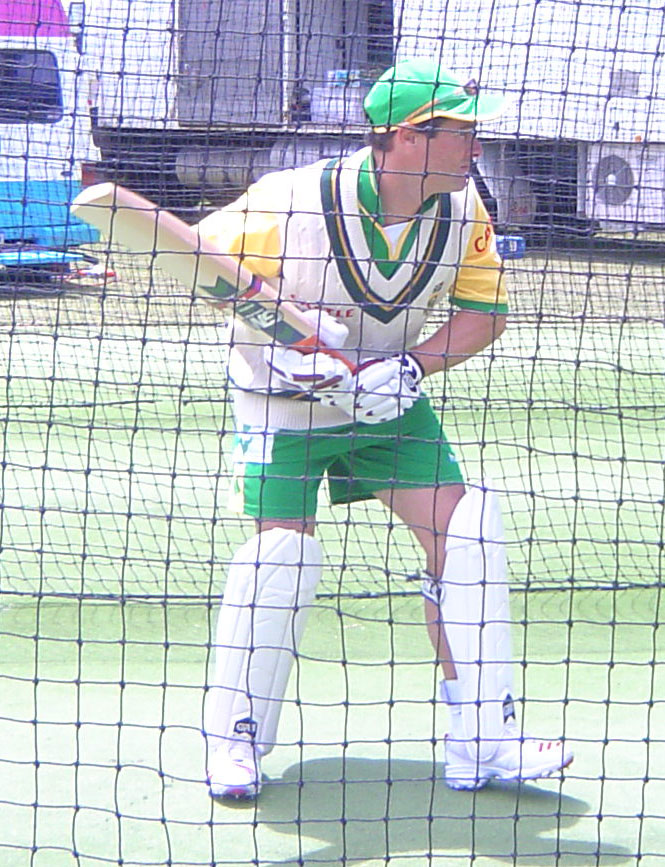
Mark Boucher, who is shown here practicing in the nets, is one of 93 players to have played Twenty20 cricket for South Africa.

This is a list of South Africa Men's Twenty20 International cricketers. The list is arranged in the order in which each player won his first Twenty20 cap. Where more than one player won his first Twenty20 cap in the same match, those players are listed alphabetically by surname.

== Key ==
General

- ‡ – Captain
- † – Wicket-keeper
- First – Year of debut
- Last – Year of latest game
- Mat – Number of matches played

Batting

- Runs – Runs scored in career
- HS – Highest score
- Avg – Runs scored per dismissal
- * – Batsman remained not out
- 50 – Half-centuries scored
- 100 – Centuries scored

Bowling

- Balls – Balls bowled in career
- Wkt – Wickets taken in career
- BBI – Best bowling in an innings
- Ave – Average runs per wicket

Fielding

- Ca – Catches taken
- St – Stumpings taken

== Players ==
Statistics are correct as of 22 March 2026.

South Africa T20I cricketers
General					Batting					Bowling				Fielding		Ref
No.	Name	First	Last	Mat	Runs	HS	Avg	50	100	Balls	Wkt	BBI	Ave	Ca	St	Ref
1	Nicky Boje	2005	2005	1	–	–	–	–	–	24	1	1/27	27.00	0	–	
2	Mark Boucher †	2005	2010	25	268	36*	17.86	0	0	–	–	–	–	18	1	
3	Herschelle Gibbs	2005	2010	23	400	90*	18.18	3	0	–	–	–	–	8	–	
4	Jacques Kallis	2005	2012	25	666	73	35.05	5	0	276	12	4/15	27.75	7	–	
5	Justin Kemp	2005	2007	8	203	89*	50.75	1	0	6	0	–	–	3	–	
6	Charl Langeveldt	2005	2010	9	4	2*	4.00	0	0	198	17	4/19	14.17	1	–	
7	Albie Morkel	2005	2015	50	572	43	21.18	0	0	647	26	3/12	33.23	17	–	
8	André Nel	2005	2007	2	0	0*	–	0	0	48	2	2/19	21.00	1	–	
9	Makhaya Ntini	2005	2011	10	10	5	5.00	0	0	192	6	2/22	49.66	2	–	
10	Shaun Pollock ‡	2005	2008	12	86	36*	12.28	0	0	243	15	3/28	20.60	2	–	
11	Ashwell Prince	2005	2005	1	5	5	5.00	0	0	–	–	–	–	0	–	
12	Graeme Smith ‡	2005	2011	33	982	89*	31.67	5	0	24	0	–	–	18	–	
13	Johan Botha ‡	2006	2012	40	201	34	18.27	0	0	774	37	3/16	22.24	17	–	
14	Boeta Dippenaar	2006	2006	1	1	1	1.00	0	0	–	–	–	–	0	–	
15	Andrew Hall	2006	2006	2	11	11	11.00	0	0	48	3	3/22	20.00	0	–	
16	Garnett Kruger	2006	2006	1	3	3	3.00	0	0	24	0	–	–	0	–	
17	Jacques Rudolph	2006	2006	1	6	6*	–	0	0	–	–	–	–	0	–	
18	Monde Zondeki	2006	2006	1	0	0	0.00	0	0	18	1	1/41	41.00	0	–	
19	Loots Bosman	2006	2010	14	323	94	24.84	3	0	–	–	–	–	1	–	
20	AB de Villiers ‡†	2006	2017	78	1,672	79*	26.12	10	0	–	–	–	–	65	7	
21	Neil McKenzie	2006	2009	2	7	7*	–	0	0	–	–	–	–	0	–	
22	Robin Peterson	2006	2014	21	124	34	15.50	0	0	359	24	3/28	18.79	10	–	
23	Roger Telemachus	2006	2007	3	5	5*	–	0	0	72	2	1/22	45.00	0	–	
24	Johan van der Wath	2006	2007	8	46	21	15.33	0	0	186	8	2/31	28.87	0	–	
25	Tyron Henderson	2006	2006	1	0	0	0.00	0	0	24	0	–	–	0	–	
26	Alfonso Thomas	2007	2007	1	–	–	–	–	–	24	3	3/25	8.33	0	–	
27	Morné van Wyk †	2007	2015	8	225	114*	37.50	1	1	–	–	–	–	5	1	
28	Morné Morkel (Note: Hashim Amla, Faf du Plessis, Imran Tahir, David Miller and Morné Morkel also played for World XI. Only their records for South Africa are given above.)	2007	2015	41	21	8*	10.50	0	0	880	46	4/17	23.84	5	–	
29	Vernon Philander	2007	2007	7	14	6	3.50	0	0	83	4	2/23	28.50	1	–	
30	JP Duminy ‡	2007	2019	81	1,934	96*	38.68	11	0	463	21	3/18	28.52	35	–	
31	Dale Steyn	2007	2020	47	21	5*	3.50	0	0	1,015	64	4/9	18.35	12	–	
32	Gulam Bodi	2007	2007	1	8	8	8.00	0	0	–	–	–	–	0	–	
33	Justin Ontong ‡	2008	2015	14	158	48	15.80	0	0	36	1	1/25	83.00	10	–	
34	Rory Kleinveldt	2008	2013	6	25	22	25.00	0	0	122	9	3/18	19.22	1	–	
35	Johann Louw	2008	2009	2	1	1*	–	0	0	42	2	2/36	27.00	0	–	
36	Lonwabo Tsotsobe	2009	2014	23	2	1*	2.00	0	0	468	18	3/16	30.05	1	–	
37	Vaughn van Jaarsveld	2009	2009	3	15	12	5.00	0	0	–	–	–	–	0	–	
38	Hashim Amla ‡	2009	2018	41	1,158	97*	32.16	7	0	–	–	–	–	18	–	
39	Wayne Parnell	2009	2023	56	174	29*	17.40	0	0	1,094	59	5/30	25.64	7	–	
40	Yusuf Abdulla	2009	2009	2	–	–	–	–	–	42	2	1/16	22.00	0	–	
41	Roelof van der Merwe (Note: Roelof van der Merwe has also played Twenty20 International cricket for the Netherlands. Only his record for South Africa is given above.)	2009	2010	13	57	48	19.00	0	0	264	14	2/14	21.78	6	–	
42	Ryan McLaren	2009	2014	12	9	6*	9.00	0	0	263	17	5/19	19.52	3	–	
43	Heino Kuhn †	2009	2017	7	49	29	12.25	0	0	–	–	–	–	5	0	
44	Alviro Petersen	2010	2010	2	14	8	7.00	0	0	–	–	–	–	1	–	
45	David Miller †	2010	2026	137	2,763	106*	34.11	9	2	–	–	–	–	84	1	
46	Colin Ingram	2010	2012	9	210	78	26.25	1	0	–	–	–	–	2	–	
47	Rusty Theron (Note: Rusty Theron also played for United States. Only his records for South Africa are given above.)	2010	2012	9	32	31*	–	0	0	194	12	4/27	21.75	2	–	
48	Richard Levi	2012	2012	13	236	117*	21.45	1	1	–	–	–	–	4	–	
49	Marchant de Lange	2012	2015	6	–	–	–	–	–	140	7	2/26	32.57	1	–	
50	Farhaan Behardien	2012	2018	38	518	64*	32.37	1	0	30	3	2/15	9.00	14	–	
51	Dane Vilas †	2012	2012	1	–	–	–	–	–	–	–	–	–	0	0	
52	Faf du Plessis	2012	2020	47	1,466	119	36.65	10	1	8	0	–	–	22	–	
53	Henry Davids	2012	2013	9	161	68	17.88	2	0	12	1	1/6	13.00	0	–	
54	Quinton de Kock †	2012	2026	110	3,095	115	30.95	19	2	–	–	–	–	98	19	
55	Chris Morris	2012	2019	23	133	55*	14.77	1	0	498	34	4/27	20.50	6	–	
56	Aaron Phangiso	2012	2018	16	19	13	6.33	0	0	342	20	3/25	22.15	0	–	
57	Kyle Abbott	2013	2016	21	23	9*	11.50	0	0	436	26	3/20	22.26	7	–	
58	Imran Tahir	2013	2019	35	19	9*	19.00	0	0	785	61	5/23	14.08	5	–	
59	David Wiese (Note: David Wiese also played for Namibia. Only his records for South Africa are given above.)	2013	2016	20	92	28	13.14	0	0	392	24	5/23	20.70	9	–	
60	Beuran Hendricks	2014	2021	19	18	12*	6.00	0	0	409	25	4/14	25.08	4	–	
61	Reeza Hendricks	2014	2025	90	2,504	117	28.78	18	1	29	0	–	–	42	–	
62	Kagiso Rabada	2014	2026	79	184	22	14.15	0	0	1,697	83	3/18	28.65	26	–	
63	Rilee Rossouw	2014	2023	29	767	109	34.86	3	2	–	–	–	–	13	–	
64	Eddie Leie	2015	2015	2	–	–	–	–	–	36	4	3/16	12.00	0	–	
65	Theunis de Bruyn	2017	2017	2	26	19	13.00	0	0	–	–	–	–	2	–	
66	Mangaliso Mosehle †	2017	2017	7	105	36	21.00	0	0	–	–	–	–	6	2	
67	Lungi Ngidi	2017	2026	64	59	13*	11.80	0	0	1,299	90	5/39	20.73	11	–	
68	Andile Phehlukwayo	2017	2024	42	166	27*	9.22	0	0	748	50	4/24	22.24	9	–	
69	JJ Smuts (Note: JJ Smuts has also played Twenty20 International cricket for the Italy. Only his record for South Africa is given above.)	2017	2021	13	174	45	13.38	0	0	136	1	1/19	178.00	1	–	
70	Dane Paterson	2017	2018	8	5	4*	5.00	0	0	179	9	4/32	29.44	1	–	
71	Dwaine Pretorius	2017	2022	30	261	77*	21.75	1	0	504	35	5/17	19.88	6	–	
72	Tabraiz Shamsi	2017	2024	70	10	4*	2.00	0	0	1,509	89	5/24	20.89	12	–	
73	Robert Frylinck	2017	2018	3	–	–	–	–	–	60	5	2/20	12.40	1	–	
74	Junior Dala	2018	2021	10	19	12*	19.00	0	0	192	13	3/35	23.61	3	–	
75	Heinrich Klaasen ‡†	2018	2024	58	1,000	81	23.25	5	0	6	0	–	–	33	5	
76	Christiaan Jonker	2018	2018	2	57	49	28.50	0	0	–	–	–	–	1	–	
77	Gihahn Cloete †	2018	2019	2	15	13	7.50	0	0	–	–	–	–	0	0	
78	Rassie van der Dussen ‡	2018	2025	57	1,406	94*	33.47	10	0	–	–	–	–	23	–	
79	Janneman Malan	2019	2021	11	241	55	21.90	1	0	–	–	–	–	3	–	
80	Lutho Sipamla	2019	2026	14	13	8*	4.33	0	0	260	10	2/22	45.20	3	–	
81	Aiden Markram ‡	2019	2026	77	1,966	86*	31.70	14	0	408	16	3/21	37.68	47	–	
82	Sinethemba Qeshile †	2019	2019	2	–	–	–	–	–	–	–	–	–	3	0	
83	Temba Bavuma ‡	2019	2023	36	670	72	21.61	1	0	–	–	–	–	15	–	
84	Bjorn Fortuin	2019	2025	27	127	32	12.70	0	0	480	23	3/16	28.26	6	–	
85	Anrich Nortje	2019	2026	47	30	12	3.75	0	0	977	56	4/7	21.19	10	–	
86	Pite van Biljon	2020	2021	10	125	42	20.83	0	0	–	–	–	–	1	–	
87	George Linde	2020	2026	32	333	48	17.52	0	0	606	34	4/21	22.14	9	–	
88	Jacques Snyman	2021	2021	1	2	2	2.00	0	0	6	0	–	–	1	–	
89	Glenton Stuurman	2021	2021	1	–	–	–	–	–	12	0	–	–	0	–	
90	Wihan Lubbe	2021	2021	2	16	12	8.00	0	0	–	–	–	–	0	–	
91	Sisanda Magala	2021	2023	6	34	18*	34.00	0	0	120	6	3/21	37.66	1	–	
92	Lizaad Williams	2021	2025	20	14	5	2.33	0	0	389	24	3/35	25.95	5	–	
93	Wiaan Mulder	2021	2026	12	105	36	17.50	0	0	120	8	2/10	24.37	6	–	
94	Keshav Maharaj ‡	2021	2026	49	104	41	10.40	0	0	1,001	48	3/24	26.87	14	–	
95	Tristan Stubbs †	2022	2026	52	967	76	30.21	2	0	12	0	–	–	31	0	
96	Marco Jansen	2022	2026	30	268	55*	17.86	2	0	659	33	4/22	29.75	16	–	
97	Dewald Brevis	2023	2026	30	697	125*	26.80	1	1	–	–	–	–	14	–	
98	Gerald Coetzee	2023	2026	13	110	23	11.00	0	0	257	14	3/32	32.35	2	–	
99	Matthew Breetzke	2023	2025	13	158	51	13.16	1	0	–	–	–	–	7	–	
100	Donovan Ferreira ‡	2023	2025	16	240	48	18.46	0	0	106	2	1/13	76.50	8	–	
101	Nandre Burger	2023	2025	8	10	9	5.00	0	0	174	6	2/21	39.83	2	–	
102	Ottniel Baartman	2024	2026	17	14	12	3.50	0	0	347	22	4/11	21.59	5	–	
103	Ryan Rickelton †	2024	2026	29	741	77*	28.50	4	0	–	–	–	–	14	0	
104	Nqaba Peter	2024	2025	12	29	10*	14.50	0	0	210	9	2/32	36.00	2	–	
105	Patrick Kruger	2024	2024	7	72	44	18.00	0	0	116	8	4/27	22.37	1	–	
106	Kwena Maphaka	2024	2026	18	19	12*	9.50	0	0	352	18	4/20	30.33	9	–	
107	Jason Smith	2024	2026	6	72	31	36.00	0	0	–	–	–	–	4	–	
108	Andile Simelane	2024	2025	10	56	13	8.00	0	0	162	8	2/28	33.87	4	–	
109	Dayyaan Galiem	2024	2024	1	–	–	–	–	–	24	2	2/21	10.50	1	–	
110	Corbin Bosch	2025	2026	22	115	30*	12.77	0	0	450	33	4/14	17.93	9	–	
111	Rubin Hermann	2025	2026	7	153	63	25.50	1	0	–	–	–	–	3	–	
112	Lhuan-dre Pretorius †	2025	2026	13	201	51	15.46	1	0	–	–	–	–	4	0	
113	Senuran Muthusamy	2025	2026	6	24	9	6.00	0	0	108	5	2/24	25.60	2	–	
114	Tony de Zorzi	2025	2026	4	40	33	20.00	0	0	–	–	–	–	0	–	
115	Connor Esterhuizen	2026	2026	2												
116	Dian Forrester	2026	2026	3												
117	Jordan Hermann	2026	2026	1												
118	Nqobani Mokoena	2026	2026	3												

== See also ==
- Twenty20 International
- South Africa national cricket team
- List of South Africa national cricket captains
- List of South Africa Test cricketers
- List of South Africa ODI cricketers
