= Duan Jansen =

South African cricketer (born 2000)

Personal information
- Full name: Duan Jansen
- Born: 1 May 2000 (age 26); Klerksdorp, North West, South Africa
- Height: 6 ft 8 in (203 cm)
- Batting: Right-handed
- Bowling: Left-arm Fast
- Role: Bowler
- Relatives: Marco Jansen (twin brother)

International information
- National side: South Africa (2026–present)
- ODI debut (cap 168): 9 September 2026 v Namibia
- Last ODI: 11 September 2026 v Namibia
- T20I debut (cap 120): 28 August 2026 v Namibia
- Last T20I: 6 September 2026 v Zimbabwe

Domestic team information
- Years: Team
- 2018/19: North West
- 2019/20–2020/21: Free State
- 2021/22–present: North West
- 2022: St Kitts & Nevis Patriots
- 2023: Mumbai Indians
- 2023–2024: MI Cape Town
- 2026: Joburg Super Kings
- 2026: Gloucestershire

Career statistics
Competition	ODI	T20I	FC	LA
Matches	3	4	29	38
Runs scored	30	51	810	439
Batting average	30.00	–	21.89	23.10
100s/50s	0/0	0/0	0/5	0/1
Top score	27*	25*	64	61*
Balls bowled	120	90	4,040	1,537
Wickets	5	11	74	50
Bowling average	17.60	12.36	29.00	27.90
5 wickets in innings	0	0	4	0
10 wickets in match	0	0	0	0
Best bowling	4/31	3/21	6/9	4/31
Catches/stumpings	0/–	1/–	16/–	19/–
- Source: Cricinfo, 29 September 2026

Duan Jansen (born 1 May 2000) is a South African cricketer. He made his first-class debut for North West in the 2018–19 CSA 3-Day Provincial Cup on 10 January 2019. He made his List A debut for North West in the 2018–19 CSA Provincial One-Day Challenge on 20 January 2019.

In September 2019, he was named in Free State's squad for the 2019–20 CSA Provincial T20 Cup. He made his Twenty20 debut for Free State in the 2019–20 CSA Provincial T20 Cup on 13 September 2019. In April 2021, he was named in North West's squad, ahead of the 2021–22 cricket season in South Africa.

Duan's twin brother, Marco, also played cricket for North West and currently plays for the South Africa national cricket team. Duan was part of the 2022 St Kitts & Nevis Patriots team competing in the 6ixty tournament and CPL. During the 6ixty tournament, he finished as one of the leading bowlers and helped his team win the tournament.
