= Namibia Cricket Ground =

Sports venue in Windhoek, Namibia

- Home of Cricket in Namibia
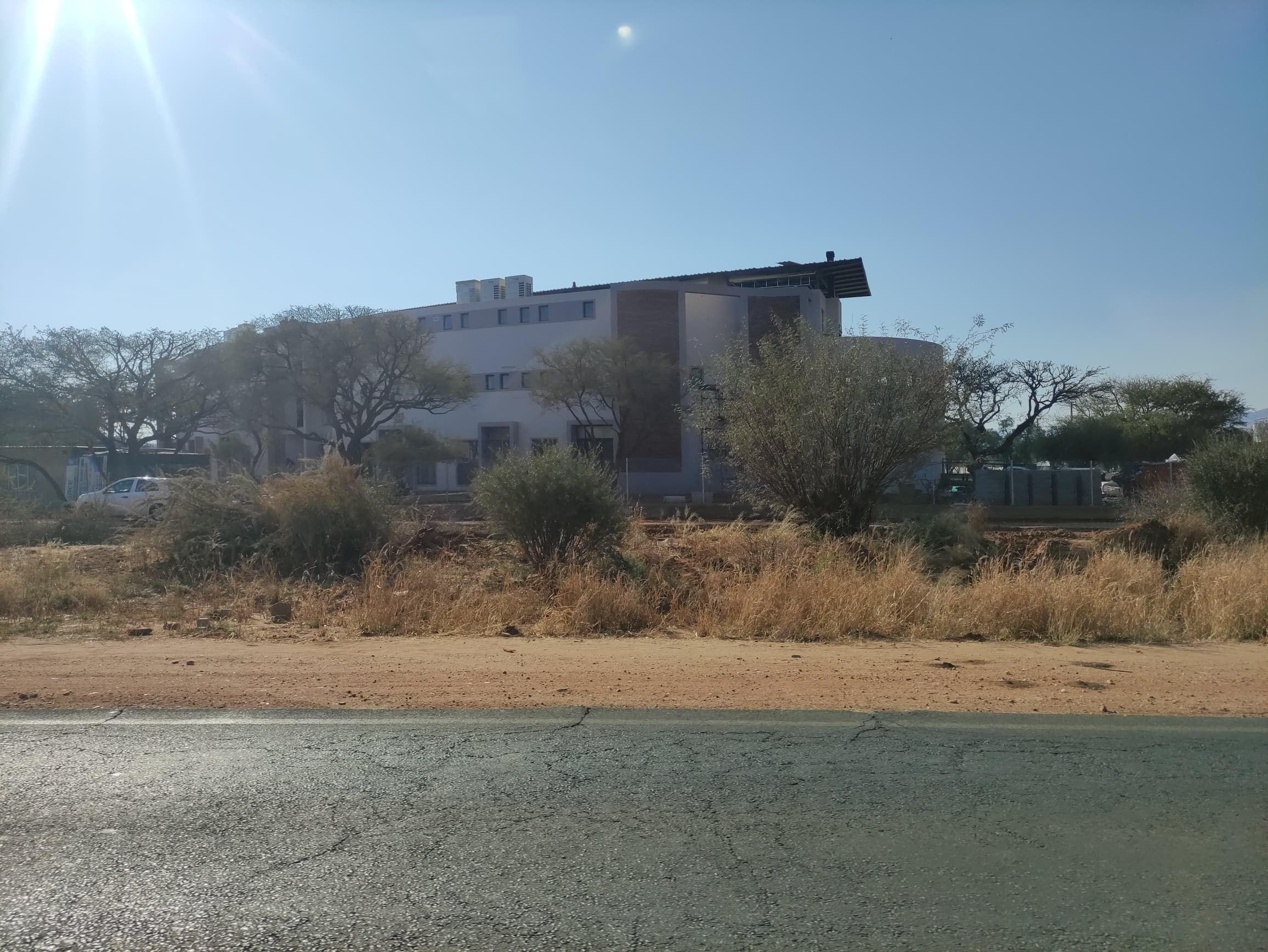
- Backside of the Namibia Cricket Ground Pavilion Building in 2025
- Interactive map of Namibia Cricket Ground

Ground information
- Location: Windhoek, Namibia
- Coordinates: 22.6059°S 17.0875°E
- Establishment: 2025; 1 year ago
- Capacity: 7,500
- Owner: Government of Namibia
- Operator: Cricket Namibia

International information
- First men's ODI: 4 April 2026: Namibia v Oman
- Last men's ODI: 13 September 2026: Namibia v South Africa
- First men's T20I: 19 March 2025: Namibia v Canada
- Last men's T20I: 6 September 2026: Zimbabwe v South Africa
- First women's T20I: 31 August 2025: Sierra Leone v Nigeria
- Last women's T20I: 30 July 2026: Namibia v Uganda

Team information
Namibia cricket team	(2025–Present)
- As of 29 August 2026; Source: ESPNcricinfo

Namibia Cricket Ground is a cricket ground in Windhoek, Namibia. It is the headquarters of cricket in Namibia.

The ground was completed in October 2025. Later that month, it was inaugurated as Cricket Namibia’s first official stadium by hosting a one-off Twenty20 International match between South Africa and Namibia, the first meeting between the two teams, which Namibia won by four wickets. The stadium has been developed on a budget of $4 million USD and is expected to be one of the host grounds for the 2027 Cricket World Cup.

Namibia hosted one of its major global ICC tournaments, the 2026 ICC Under-19 Men’s Cricket World Cup, featuring 16 teams. The event, co-hosted by Zimbabwe and Namibia, featured eight group matches at the Namibia Cricket Ground.

Previously, Namibia hosted only regional qualifiers and division-level tournaments featuring six to eight teams.

The ground was selected as the venue for the 2026 Namibia T20 Tri-Series, also featuring Zimbabwe and South Africa. It subsequently hosted the three-match ODI series between Namibia and South Africa immediately following the tri-nation series.
