= Andile Simelane =

South African cricketer (born 2003)

Personal information
- Born: 3 June 2003 (age 23); Durban, South Africa
- Batting: Right-handed
- Bowling: Right-arm fast
- Role: All-rounder

International information
- National side: South Africa (2024–present)
- T20I debut (cap 108): 8 November 2024 v India
- Last T20I: 1 November 2025 v Pakistan

Domestic team information
- Years: Team
- 2019/20: KwaZulu-Natal Inland
- 2021/22–: KwaZulu-Natal
- 2024/25: Sunrisers Eastern Cape

Career statistics
Competition	T20I	FC	LA	T20
Matches	10	10	31	46
Runs scored	56	229	335	202
Batting average	8.00	19.08	19.70	8.78
100s/50s	0/0	0/1	1/0	0/0
Top score	13	50*	110	28*
Balls bowled	162	897	929	543
Wickets	8	10	25	34
Bowling average	33.87	58.60	36.76	24.11
5 wickets in innings	0	0	0	0
10 wickets in match	0	0	0	0
Best bowling	2/28	2/17	3/30	4/19
Catches/stumpings	4/–	6/–	11/–	15/–
- Source: Cricinfo, 6 December 2025

Andile Simelane (born 3 June 2003) is a South African cricketer. He made his List A debut on 26 January 2020, for KwaZulu-Natal Inland in the 2019–20 CSA Provincial One-Day Challenge. He made his Twenty20 debut on 8 October 2021, for the South Africa Under-19s in the 2021–22 CSA Provincial T20 Knock-Out tournament. In November 2021, he was named in South Africa's team for the 2022 ICC Under-19 Cricket World Cup in the West Indies. On 19 February 2023, he made his First class debut for Dolphins in the 2022–23 CSA 4-Day Series tournament.
