= Lhuan-dre Pretorius =

South African cricketer

Personal information
- Full name: Lhuan-dre Gilbert Pretorius
- Born: 27 March 2006 (age 20); Potchefstroom, North West, South Africa
- Batting: Left-handed
- Role: Wicket-keeper, batter

International information
- National side: South Africa (2025–present)
- Test debut (cap 371): 28 June 2025 v Zimbabwe
- Last Test: 6 July 2025 v Zimbabwe
- ODI debut (cap 163): 4 November 2025 v Pakistan
- Last ODI: 8 November 2025 v Pakistan
- T20I debut (cap 112): 14 July 2025 v Zimbabwe
- Last T20I: 1 November 2025 v Pakistan

Domestic team information
- Years: Team
- 2023/24–: Titans
- 2025: Paarl Royals
- 2025–2026: Rajasthan Royals
- 2025: Hampshire
- 2026: San Francisco Unicorns
- 2026: London Spirit

Career statistics
Competition	Test	ODI	T20I	FC
Matches	2	3	13	13
Runs scored	235	142	201	1,004
Batting average	78.33	47.33	25.12	55.77
100s/50s	1/1	0/1	1/2	4/5
Top score	153	57	101	153
Catches/stumpings	1/0	2/0	4/0	14/0
- Source: Cricinfo, 29 January 2026

Lhuan-dre Gilbert Pretorius (born 27 March 2006) is a South African professional cricketer. He is a left-handed batsman and wicket keeper. He plays domestic cricket for Titans and plays for Paarl Royals in the SA20, and for South Africa in international cricket.

== Early and personal life ==
He was born in March 2006 and has a younger brother, Vihan. He attended high-school at St Stithians College prior to moving to Pretoria's Cornwall Hill College in his final year.

== Youth Career ==
He was South Africa U19's leading run-scorer at the 2024 Under-19 Cricket World Cup, with 287 runs in six games at an average of 57.40 and a strike rate of 94.09, with three half-centuries.

== Domestic and Franchise Career ==
He made his debut in the CSA T20 Challenge aged 17 years-old in March 2024 just after the U19 World Cup. He made an impression in September 2024 when he struck 82 off just 43 balls against Gauteng, then his highest T20 score.

He made his first-class cricket debut in the 2024–25 CSA 4-Day Series for Titans against Warriors in December 2024, scoring 120 on debut in the first innings.

He made his T20 franchise debut for Paarl Royals in January 2025 in the 2025 SA20, and scored a career-best 97 on debut from 51 balls against Sunrisers Eastern Cape. Shortly after, he scored 83 from 52 balls in the Cape derby against MI Cape Town.

In February 2025, he signed for Hampshire County Cricket Club to play in the T20 Blast.

In May 2025, he was called to into the IPL to play for the Rajasthan Royals as a replacement for injured Nitish Rana.

On 8 July 2026, Pretorius hit his maiden T20 hundred, scoring 102 of 52 balls, batting for the San Francisco Unicorns in the MLC. He won player of the match as he helped them chase down 144 against MI New York.

On 2 October, 2026, Pretorius hit 188* runs off just 79 balls, batting for the Titans during a CSA T20 Challenge match. He broke Chris Gayle's record for the highest individual score in T20 cricket history.

== International Career ==
On 28 June 2025, aged 19 years and 93 days, Pretorius became the youngest South African to make a Test match century when he scored 153 in his debut innings against Zimbabwe at Queens Sports Club in Bulawayo.. However this series was played without the benefit of the Decision Review System (DRS) and Pretorius did not walk when he nicked a ball to the wicketkeeper when on 30..

On 4 November 2025, he became the 12th South African to score 50 or more on ODI debut, after scoring 57(60) against Pakistan at Faisalabad. He followed that up by scoring 46(40) in the second ODI.

On 4 September 2026, Pretorius hit his maiden T20I century, smashing 101 runs off just 53 balls against Namibia during the 2026 Namibia T20I Tri-Nation Series and was named Player of the match.

== International centuries ==
Test centuries by Lhuan-dre Pretorius
No.	Runs	Balls	Innings	Against	Venue	Country	Date	Result
1	153	160	1	Zimbabwe	Queens Sports Club, Bulawayo	Zimbabwe	28 June 2025	South Africa won by 328 runs

T20I centuries by Lhuan-dre Pretorius
No.	Runs	Balls	Innings	Against	Venue	Country	Date	Result
1	101	53	1	Namibia	Namibia Cricket Ground, Windhoek	Namibia	4 September 2026	South Africa won by 11 runs
