= Max Heingo =

Namibian cricketer

Personal information
- Full name: Max Heingo
- Born: 8 March 2008 (age 18); Oshali, Ohangwena Region, Namibia
- Batting: Right-handed
- Bowling: Right-arm medium-fast
- Role: Bowler

International information
- National side: Namibia (2025–present)
- ODI debut (cap 3): 09 September 2026 v South Africa
- Last ODI: 09 September 2026 v South Africa
- T20I debut (cap 14): 11 October 2025 v South Africa
- Last T20I: 04 September 2026 v South Africa

Career statistics
Competition	Test	ODI	T20I	FC
Matches	-	3	14	21
Runs scored	-	0	0	0
Batting average	-	-	-	-
100s/50s	-	0/0	0/0	0/0
Top score	-	0	0	0
Balls bowled	-	127	229	446
Wickets	-	3	12	23
Bowling average	-	46.33	29.25	21.75
5 wickets in innings	-	0	0	0
10 wickets in match	-	0	0	0
Best bowling	-	3/59	2/16	8/25
Catches/stumpings	-	-/–	-/–	0/–
- Source: ESPNcricinfo, 10 September 2026

Max Heingo (born 8 March 2008) is a Namibian cricketer who plays a bowler for Namibia National Cricket Team. He is a right arm medium bowler.

== Early life ==
Max Heingo was born in Oshali, Ohangwena, Namibia. He was raised by his grandmother in Oshali and moved to Walvis Bay to live with his mother who was a factory worker. He attended Nara Primary School and took up cricket. His coach encouraged him to try seam bowling. With no turf wicker to play on, he played cricket on concrete patches without spikes.

== Career ==
Heingo played for Namibia U19 at the age of 16 at Windhoek. On 19 July 2025, he made his T20 debut against Nigeria at Entebbe. Domestically he played for Etosha Wildcat, Pupkewits Motors Wildcats and Namibia A.

On 4 April 2026, he made his ODI debut against Oman at Windhoek. In 2026, he was selected for Men's T20 World Cup in India. His first match was against Netherlands, he finished with a bowling figure of 0–22–2.

He was selected for the tri-series against Namibia, Zimbabwe and South Africa which took placed in Windhoek, Namibia.
