= Jason Smith (cricketer) =

South African cricketer (born 1994)

Personal information
- Full name: Jason Franswyn Smith
- Born: 11 October 1994 (age 32); Cape Town, Western Cape, South Africa
- Batting: Right-handed
- Bowling: Right-arm medium-fast
- Role: Top-order batter

International information
- National side: South Africa (2024–present)
- ODI debut (cap 150): 18 September 2024 v Afghanistan
- Last ODI: 10 February 2025 v New Zealand
- T20I debut (cap 107): 27 August 2024 v West Indies
- Last T20I: 11 October 2025 v Namibia

Domestic team information
- Years: Team
- 2012/13–2019/20: Western Province
- 2015/16–2020/21: Cape Cobras
- 2018/19: South Western Districts
- 2018: Cape Town Blitz
- 2021/22–present: KwaZulu-Natal Coastal
- 2024–2025: Durban's Super Giants
- 2025–present: MI Cape Town

Career statistics
Competition	ODI	T20I	FC	LA
Matches	3	6	95	80
Runs scored	132	72	4,431	2,180
Batting average	44.00	36.00	34.34	35.73
100s/50s	0/1	0/0	7/30	1/16
Top score	91	31	147	116*
Balls bowled	30	–	5,916	1,376
Wickets	0	–	108	36
Bowling average	–	–	27.98	36.86
5 wickets in innings	–	–	4	0
10 wickets in match	–	–	1	0
Best bowling	–	–	6/49	4/38
Catches/stumpings	1/–	4/–	46/–	24/–
- Source: ESPNcricinfo, 21 February 2026

Jason Franswyn Smith (born 11 October 1994) is a South African cricketer. He was part of South Africa's squad for the 2014 ICC Under-19 Cricket World Cup. In August 2017, he was named in Cape Town Knight Riders' squad for the first season of the T20 Global League. However, in October 2017, Cricket South Africa initially postponed the tournament until November 2018, with it being cancelled soon after.

In June 2018, he was named in the squad for the Cape Cobras team for the 2018–19 season. In September 2018, he was named in South Western Districts' squad for the 2018 Africa T20 Cup. In October 2018, he was named in Cape Town Blitz's squad for the first edition of the Mzansi Super League T20 tournament.

In September 2019, he was named in Western Province's squad for the 2019–20 CSA Provincial T20 Cup. In April 2021, Smith was named in the South Africa Emerging Men's squad for their six-match tour of Namibia. Later the same month, he was named in KwaZulu-Natal's squad, ahead of the 2021–22 cricket season in South Africa.
