= Rubin Hermann =

South African cricketer (born 1997)

Personal information
- Full name: Rubin Andrew Hermann
- Born: 26 January 1997 (age 29); Pretoria, Gauteng, South Africa
- Batting: Left-handed
- Role: Wicket-keeper
- Relatives: Jordan Hermann (brother)

International information
- National side: South Africa
- ODI debut (cap 165): 8 November 2025 v Pakistan
- Last ODI: 9 September 2026 v Namibia
- T20I debut (cap 111): 14 July 2025 v Zimbabwe
- Last T20I: 6 September 2026 v Zimbabwe

Domestic team information
- Years: Team
- 2016/17–2020/21: Northerns
- 2018/19–2020/21: Titans
- 2021/22–2022/23: Mpumalanga
- 2023/24–present: North West
- 2025–2026: Paarl Royals

Career statistics
Competition	ODI	T20I	FC	LA
Matches	2	17	40	50
Runs scored	9	327	2,112	1,891
Batting average	4.50	23.35	35.79	47.27
100s/50s	0/0	0/1	3/12	6/8
Top score	8	63	143	158*
Catches/stumpings	1/0	8/–	90/7	45/3
- Source: Cricinfo, 9 September 2026

Rubin Andrew Hermann (born 26 January 1997) is a South African cricketer. He made his List A debut for Northerns in the 2016–17 CSA Provincial One-Day Challenge on 26 March 2017, scoring a century. He made his Twenty20 debut for Northerns in the 2017 Africa T20 Cup on 2 September 2017. He made his first-class debut for Northerns in the 2017–18 Sunfoil 3-Day Cup on 23 November 2017.

== Early life ==
Hermann developed his cricketing skills at Assupol TuksCricket (University of Pretoria), where he made headlines for scoring 245 runs off 148 balls—the highest score ever recorded by a Tuks player in a limited-overs game. His brother Jordan Hermann play for Sunrisers Eastern Cape in SA20.

== Career ==
In September 2018, he was named in Northerns' squad for the 2018 Africa T20 Cup. In April 2021, he was named in Mpumalanga's squad, ahead of the 2021–22 cricket season in South Africa.

In the 2023–24 CSA T20 Challenge, Hermann scored 436 runs at an average of 39.63, which led to his selection by the Paarl Royals for the 2025 SA20 season. In October 2024, he was signed by Paarl Royals for the 2025 SA20. In the second qualifier match against Sunrisers Eastern Cape, he scored an unbeaten 81 runs off 53 balls, guiding his team to a crucial victory.

In June 2025, he was earned maiden call-up for national team for the T20I Tri-Series against Zimbabwe and New Zealand.
