= Kwena Maphaka =

South African cricketer

Personal information
- Full name: Kwena Tshegofatso Maphaka
- Born: 8 April 2006 (age 20); Johannesburg, South Africa
- Batting: Left-handed
- Bowling: Left-arm Fast
- Role: Bowler

International information
- National side: South Africa (2024–present)
- Test debut (cap 369): 3 January 2025 v Pakistan
- Last Test: 28 June 2025 v Zimbabwe
- ODI debut (cap 153): 19 December 2024 v Pakistan
- Last ODI: 24 August 2025 v Australia
- T20I debut (cap 106): 23 August 2024 v West Indies
- Last T20I: 1 March 2026 v Zimbabwe

Domestic team information
- Years: Team
- 2023/24–present: Lions
- 2024: Mumbai Indians
- 2025: Rajasthan Royals
- 2026: Durban's Super Giants

Career statistics
| Competition | Test | ODI | T20I | FC |
|---|---|---|---|---|
| Matches | 2 | 3 | 18 | 6 |
| Runs scored | 17 | 1 | 19 | 26 |
| Batting average | 8.50 | 0.33 | 9.50 | 5.20 |
| 100s/50s | 0/0 | 0/0 | 0/0 | 0/0 |
| Top score | 9* | 1 | 12* | 9* |
| Balls bowled | 260 | 131 | 352 | 720 |
| Wickets | 3 | 5 | 18 | 21 |
| Bowling average | 56.66 | 39.00 | 30.33 | 23.80 |
| 5 wickets in innings | 0 | 0 | 0 | 0 |
| 10 wickets in match | 0 | 0 | 0 | 0 |
| Best bowling | 2/43 | 4/72 | 4/20 | 3/24 |
| Catches/stumpings | 2/– | 1/– | 9/– | 3/– |
- Source: ESPNcricinfo, 2 March 2026

Kwena Tshegofatso Maphaka (born 8 April 2006) is a South African international cricketer. He is primarily a left-arm fast bowler. He played for the South African team in the Under-19 World Cup, where in the semi-final he took 3 wickets for 32 runs in 10 overs against India. He made his debut with Mumbai Indians in IPL 2024. He was bought by Rajasthan Royals.

At 18 years and 137 days old, he became the youngest South African to make his debut in men's international cricket, while still completing school at St Stithians College, Johannesburg.

== Under-19 career ==
As a 15-year-old, Maphaka was included in the 2022 Under-19 Cricket World Cup in the West Indies in January and February 2022. He played three of South Africa's six matches and took seven wickets at an average of 18.28 with an economy rate of 5.56.

In December 2023, he was named in South Africa's national under-19 squad for the 2024 Under-19 Cricket World Cup. In the first match against West Indies, he took a match-winning five-wicket haul, for which he got the player of the match award. Maphaka shined for South Africa in the Super six stage, as he took five-wicket and six-wicket hauls against Zimbabwe and Sri Lanka respectively. He took a record three five-wicket hauls in the tournament, the highest by any player in a single Under-19 World Cup tournament. He then went on to take 3 wickets against India in the semi-finals in a losing cause. Maphaka ended his campaign with 21 wickets (second most in a single tournament) at an average of 9.71. Adding his 7 wickets in the 2022 edition, his total tally of 28 wickets in Under-19 Men's Cricket World Cups puts him equal to Zimbabwe's Wesley Madhevere for the most wickets overall.

== Domestic career ==
Maphaka made his List A debut on 6 October 2023 during the Division 2 of the 2023 CSA One-Day Cup. He played for the South Africa Emerging Players side against Limpopo, he took 3 wickets to help his side win the match. South Africa Emerging won the division 2 final against Free State Knights, Maphaka had a tough day as he conceded 65 runs without taking a wicket.

In August 2023, Maphaka was signed by Paarl Royals for the 2024 SA20 season. He missed the tournament to attend the Under-19 World Cup that was being played at the same time, but was retained by Paarl Royals for the 2025 SA20.

Kwena joined his brother Tetelo in the Lions squad in South Africa's Division 1 and in March 2024 he made his debut against Boland in the CSA T20 Challenge competition.

In March 2024, he was named as a replacement for the injured Dilshan Madushanka in the Mumbai Indians' squad for the 2024 Indian Premier League. He played two matches and became the youngest South African - and third youngest overseas player overall - to feature in the IPL.

== International career ==
In June 2023, South Africa A toured Sri Lanka for two First-class and three List A matches. Maphaka was not named in the initial squad, but then he replaced the injured Lutho Sipamla. Soon, he made his first-class debut in the first unofficial test match on 12 June 2023, at the age of 17. He took 2 wickets in the first innings and scalped the wicket of Sri Lanka A's captain in the second innings.

Maphaka was named in the South African squad for the T20i leg of their August 2024 tour of the West Indies. He made his T20i debut on 23 August 2024 after an injury ruled Lungi Ngidi out of the series. He became the youngest South African man to play international cricket, at only 18 years and 137 days old. He claimed match figures of 1/25 in 3.5 overs, with the West Indian captain Rovman Powell becoming his first international wicket. In December 2024, he was called to replace Gerald Coetzee, who suffered a groin injury, for the second Test against Sri Lanka.

On 19 December 2024, he became the youngest ODI debutant for South Africa, picked up figures of 4/72 in a high-scoring contest against Pakistan. He took wicket of Babar Azam as his first test wicket.
