= Nqobani Mokoena =

South African cricketer

Personal information
- Full name: Nqobani Mokoena
- Born: 5 May 2006 (age 20); Durban, KwaZulu-Natal, South Africa
- Batting: Right-handed
- Bowling: Right arm fast medium
- Role: Bowler

International information
- National side: South Africa
- ODI debut (cap 169): 11 September 2026 v Namibia
- Last ODI: 13 September 2026 v Namibia
- Only T20I (cap 118): 15 March 2026 v New Zealand

Domestic team information
- Years: Team
- 2025–present: Dolphins
- 2025/26: Paarl Royals
- Source: ESPNcricinfo, 15 March 2026

Nqobani Mokoena (born 5 May 2006) is a South African cricketer who plays as a fast bowler for the Dolphins and Paarl Royals. He represented South Africa Under 19 and received his first call up to the South Africa Twenty20 International squad in 2026.

== Early life and education ==
Mokoena grew up in KwaMashu, north of Durban, and began playing cricket at about the age of ten after watching friends train at local grounds. He was raised by his mother, and members of his extended family supported his cricket development. Former cricketer Khalipha Cele helped him move to Northwood School on a sports scholarship. By late 2023, he was a Grade 11 pupil at Northwood. At school, he moved from spin bowling to batting and later to fast bowling.

== Career ==
Mokoena was named in South Africa's provisional squad for the 2024 Under 19 Cricket World Cup in 2023. He played three matches in South Africa's home World Cup campaign, including the semifinal, although injury limited his involvement. He made his debut for the Dolphins in the opening match of the 2024–25 CSA T20 Challenge. In January 2025, he took 5 for 49 against England Under 19 in the first Youth Test at Coetzenburg. He received a Dolphins rookie contract in June 2025. He was then signed by Paarl Royals at the September 2025 SA20 auction.

During the 2026 SA20, Mokoena was used with the new ball and at the death. His figures of 4 for 34 against Sunrisers Eastern Cape on 31 December 2025 were his best of the season. He finished the competition with 13 wickets in 10 matches and received his first call up to South Africa's Twenty20 International squad in February 2026 for the tour of New Zealand.
