= Jordan Hermann =

South African cricketer (born 2001)

Personal information
- Full name: Jordan Gabriel Hermann
- Born: 4 December 2001 (age 24); Pretoria, Gauteng, South Africa
- Batting: Left-handed
- Bowling: Right-arm off break
- Role: Batter
- Relatives: Rubin Hermann (brother)

International information
- National side: South Africa
- ODI debut (cap 166): 9 September 2026 v Namibia
- Last ODI: 13 September 2026 v Namibia
- T20I debut (cap 117): 15 March 2026 v New Zealand
- Last T20I: 6 September 2026 v Zimbabwe

Domestic team information
- Years: Team
- 2021/22: Titans
- 2022/23–present: Warriors
- 2023–present: Sunrisers Eastern Cape
- 2026: Somerset

Career statistics
Competition	ODI	T20I	FC	LA
Matches	3	6	45	33
Runs scored	247	109	3,463	1,340
Batting average	82.33	27.25	46.79	46.20
100s/50s	1/1	0/1	9/21	5/5
Top score	150	53	187*	186*
Balls bowled	–	3	480	132
Wickets	–	0	6	5
Bowling average	–	–	48.00	24.40
5 wickets in innings	–	–	0	0
10 wickets in match	–	–	0	0
Best bowling	–	–	3/35	3/20
Catches/stumpings	1/–	4/–	41/–	19/–
- Source: Cricinfo, 25 September 2026

Jordan Gabriel Hermann (born 4 December 2001) is a South African cricketer. He made his first-class debut on 29 October 2021, for Titans in the 2021–22 CSA 4-Day Series. He made his List A debut on 2 December 2022, for Warriors in the CSA Provincial One-Day Challenge. He made his Twenty20 debut on 18 October 2022, for Warriors in the 2022 CSA T20 Challenge.

Hermann developed his cricketing skills at Assupol TuksCricket (University of Pretoria). His brother Rubin Hermann play for Paarl Royals in SA20.

He plays for Sunrisers Eastern Cape in SA20. In 2025 season league stage against Paarl Royals he scored 53 off 38 balls. In the second qualifier match against same team, he scored an unbeaten 69 runs off 48 balls, guiding his team to a crucial victory.

In May 2026, Hermann signed for Somerset County Cricket Club to play in the County Championship.
