= List of South Africa Twenty20 International cricket records =

A Twenty20 International (T20I) is a form of cricket, played between two of the international members of the International Cricket Council (ICC), in which each team faces a maximum of twenty overs. The matches have top-class status and are the highest T20 standard. The game is played under the rules of Twenty20 cricket. The first Twenty20 International match between two men's sides was played on 17 February 2005, involving Australia and New Zealand. Wisden Cricketers' Almanack reported that "neither side took the game especially seriously", and it was noted by Cricinfo that but for a large score for Ricky Ponting, "the concept would have shuddered". However, Ponting himself said "if it does become an international game then I'm sure the novelty won't be there all the time". This is a list of South Africa Cricket team's Twenty20 International records. It is based on the List of Twenty20 International records, but concentrates solely on records dealing with the South African cricket team. South Africa played their first ever T20I in 2005.

== Key ==
The top five records are listed for each category, except for the team wins, losses, draws and ties, all round records and the partnership records. Tied records for fifth place are also included. Explanations of the general symbols and cricketing terms used in the list are given below. Specific details are provided in each category where appropriate. All records include matches played for South Africa only, and are correct as of August 2020.

Key
Symbol	Meaning
†	Player or umpire is currently active in T20I cricket
‡	Even took place during a Men's T20 World Cup
*	Player remained not out or partnership remained unbroken
♠	Twenty20 International cricket record
Date	Starting date of the match
Innings	Number of innings played
Matches	Number of matches played
Opposition	The team South Africa was playing against
Period	The time period when the player was active in ODI cricket
Player	The player involved in the record
Venue	Twenty20 International cricket ground where the match was played

== Team records ==
=== Overall Record ===
Matches	Won	Lost	Tied	NR	Win %
221	119	97	2	3	55.50
Last Updated: 11 September 2025

=== Team wins, losses, draws and ties ===
As of September 2025, South Africa has played 205 T20I matches resulting in 112victories, 89 defeats, 1 tie, and 3 no result for an overall winning percentage of 54.63.

Opponent	Matches	Won	Lost	Tied	No Result	% Won
Full Members
Afghanistan	3	3	0	0	0	100.00
Australia	28	9	19	0	0	32.14
Bangladesh	9	9	0	0	0	100.00
England	27	14	12	0	1	51.85
India	31	12	18	0	1	38.70
Ireland	7	6	1	0	0	85.71
New Zealand	18	11	7	0	0	61.11
Pakistan	24	12	12	0	0	50.00
Sri Lanka	18	12	5	1	0	66.66
West Indies	26	12	14	0	0	46.15
Zimbabwe	12	11	0	0	1	91.67
Associate Members
Namibia	3	1	2	0	0	33.33
Nepal	1	1	0	0	0	100.00
Netherlands	3	2	1	0	0	66.66
Scotland	1	1	0	0	0	100.00
United States	1	1	0	0	0	100.00
Total	205	112	89	1	3	54.63
Statistics are correct as of England v South Africa at Sophia Gardens, 10 September 2025

=== First bilateral T20I series wins ===
Opponent	Year of first Home win	Year of first Away win
Australia	2006	2018
Bangladesh	2008	2015
England	2016	2022
India	2011	2015
Ireland	YTP	2021
New Zealand	2007	2012
Pakistan	2007	2010
Sri Lanka	2019	2013
West Indies	2026	2010
Zimbabwe	2010	YTP
Last Updated: 22 July 2021

=== First T20I match wins ===
Opponent	Home		Away / Neutral	
Opponent	Venue	Year	Venue	Year
Afghanistan	YTP	YTP	Kensington Oval, Bridgetown, Barbados	2010
Australia	New Wanderers Stadium, Johannesburg, South Africa	2006	Adelaide Oval, Adelaide, Australia	2014
Bangladesh	Sahara Park Newlands, Cape Town, South Africa	2007	Sher-e-Bangla National Cricket Stadium, Mirpur, Bangladesh	2015
England	Sahara Park Newlands, Cape Town, South Africa	2007	Trent Bridge, Nottingham, England	2009
India	New Wanderers Stadium, Johannesburg, South Africa	2012	Trent Bridge, Nottingham, England	2009
Ireland	YTP	YTP	Malahide Cricket Club Ground, Dublin, Ireland	2021
Nepal	YTP	YTP	Arnos Vale Stadium, Kingstown, Saint Vincent and the Grenadines	2024
Netherlands	YTP	YTP	Zohur Ahmed Chowdhury Stadium, Chittagong, Bangladesh	2014
New Zealand	Sahara Stadium, Kingsmead, Durban, South Africa	2007	Lord's, London, England	2009
Pakistan	New Wanderers Stadium, Johannesburg, South Africa	2007	Sheikh Zayed Cricket Stadium, Abu Dhabi, UAE	2010
Scotland	YTP	YTP	The Oval, London, England	2009
Sri Lanka	Centurion Park, Centurion, South Africa	2017	Mahinda Rajapaksa International Stadium, Hambantota, Sri Lanka	2012
United States	YTP	YTP	Sir Vivian Richards Stadium, North Sound, Antigua and Barbuda	2024
West Indies	New Wanderers Stadium, Johannesburg, South Africa	2007	The Oval, London, England	2009
Zimbabwe	Goodyear Park, Bloemfontein, South Africa	2010	Mahinda Rajapaksa International Stadium, Hambantota, Sri Lanka	2012
Last Updated: 22 July 2021

=== Team scoring records ===
==== Most runs in an innings ====
Rank	Score	Opposition	Venue	Date
1	259/4	West Indies	Centurion Park, Centurion, South Africa	26 March 2023
2	241/6	England	Centurion Park, Centurion, South Africa	15 November 2009
3	231/7	West Indies	New Wanderers Stadium, Johannesburg, South Africa	11 January 2015
4	229/4	England	Wankhede Stadium, Mumbai, India	18 March 2016 ‡
5	227/3	India	Holkar Cricket Stadium, Indore, India	4 October 2022
Last Updated: 17 March 2024

==== Fewest runs in an innings ====
Rank	Score	Opposition	Venue	Date
1	74/10	India	Barabati Stadium, Cuttack, India	9 December 2025
2	87/9	India	Saurashtra Cricket Association Stadium, Rajkot, India	17 June 2022
3	89/10	Australia	New Wanderers Stadium, Johannesburg, South Africa	21 February 2020
4	95/10	India	Wanderers, Johannesburg, South Africa	14 December 2023
5	96/10	Australia	Sahara Park Newlands, Cape Town, South Africa	26 February 2020
Last Updated: 9 December 2025

==== Most runs conceded in an innings ====
Rank	Score	Opposition	Venue	Date
1	304/2	England	Old Trafford, Manchester, England	12 September 2025
2	283/1	India	New Wanderers Stadium, Johannesburg, South Africa	15 November 2024
3	258/5	West Indies	Centurion Park, Centurion, South Africa	26 March 2023
4	237/3	India	Barsapara Cricket Stadium, Guwahati, India	2 October 2022
5	236/6	West Indies	New Wanderers Stadium, Johannesburg, South Africa	11 January 2015
Last Updated: 12 September 2025

==== Fewest runs conceded in an innings ====
Rank	Score	Opposition	Venue	Date
1	56/10	Afghanistan	Brian Lara Cricket Academy, San Fernando, Trinidad and Tobago	26 June 2024 ‡
2	77/10	Sri Lanka	Nassau County International Cricket Stadium, New York, United States	3 June 2024 ‡
3	80/10	Afghanistan	Kensington Oval, Bridgetown, Barbados	5 May 2010 ‡
4	81/10	Scotland	The Oval, London, England	7 June 2009 ‡
5	84/10	Bangladesh	Sheikh Zayed Cricket Stadium, Abu Dhabi, United Arab Emirates	2 November 2021 ‡
Last Updated: 3 June 2024

==== Most runs aggregate in a match ====
Rank	Aggregate	Scores	Venue	Date
1	517/9	West Indies (258/5) v South Africa (259/4)	Centurion Park, Centurion, South Africa	26 March 2023
2	467/13	South Africa (231/7) v West Indies (236/6)	New Wanderers Stadium, Johannesburg, South Africa	11 January 2015
3	459/12	South Africa (229/4) v England (230/8)	Wankhede Stadium, Mumbai, India	18 March 2016 ‡
4	458/6	India (237/3) v South Africa (221/3)	Assam Cricket Association Stadium, Guwahati	2 October 2022
5	448/11	South Africa (222/6) v England (226/5)	Centurion Park, Centurion, South Africa	16 February 2020
Last Updated: 2 October 2022

==== Fewest runs aggregate in a match ====
Rank	Aggregate	Scores	Venue	Date
1	116/11	Afghanistan (56) v South Africa (60/1)	Brian Lara Cricket Academy, San Fernando, Trinidad and Tobago	26 June 2024 ‡
2	118/13	South Africa (58/8) v West Indies (60/5)	Axxess DSL St. Georges, Port Elizabeth, South Africa	16 December 2007
3	124/9	South Africa (78/4) v Sri Lanka (46/5)	Mahinda Rajapaksa International Stadium, Hambantota, Sri Lanka	22 September 2012 ‡
4	157/14	Sri Lanka (77) v South Africa (80/4)	Nassau County International Cricket Stadium, New York, United States	3 June 2024 ‡
5	151/10	South Africa (97/5) v England (54/5)	Sophia Gardens, Cardiff, Wales	10 September 2025
Last Updated: 11 September 2025

=== Result records ===
A T20I match is won when one side has scored more runs than the runs scored by the opposing side during their innings. If both sides have completed both their allocated innings and the side that fielded last has the higher aggregate of runs, it is known as a win by runs. This indicates the number of runs that they had scored more than the opposing side. If the side batting last wins the match, it is known as a win by wickets, indicating the number of wickets that were still to fall.

==== Greatest win margins (by runs) ====
Rank	Margin	Opposition	Venue	Date
1	130 Runs	Scotland	The Oval, London, England	7 June 2009 ‡
2	104 Runs	Bangladesh	Sydney Cricket Ground, Sydney, Australia	27 October 2022 ‡
3	90 Runs	England	Rose Bowl, Southampton, England	31 July 2022
4	84 Runs	England	Centurion Park, Centurion, South Africa	15 November 2009
5	83 Runs	Bangladesh	North West Cricket Stadium, Potchefstroom, South Africa	29 October 2017
Last Updated: 31 July 2022

==== Greatest win margins (by balls remaining) ====
Rank	Balls remaining	Margin	Opposition	Venue	Date
1	67	9 wickets	Afghanistan	Brian Lara Cricket Academy, San Fernando, Trinidad and Tobago	26 June 2024 ‡
2	51	10 wickets	Pakistan	New Wanderers Stadium, Johannesburg, South Africa	2 February 2007
3	47	8 wickets	New Zealand	Sahara Stadium, Kingsmead, Durban, South Africa	21 December 2012
4	44	10 wickets	Zimbabwe	Mahinda Rajapaksa International Stadium, Hambantota, Sri Lanka	20 September 2012 ‡
5	40	6 wickets	United Arab Emirates	Arun Jaitley Cricket Stadium, Delhi, India	18 February 2026 ‡
Last Updated: 1 March 2026

==== Greatest win margins (by wickets) ====
A total of 22 matches have ended with chasing team winning by 10 wickets with South Africa winning by such margins three times.

Margin	Opposition	Venue	Date
10 wickets	Pakistan	New Wanderers Stadium, Johannesburg, South Africa	2 February 2007
10 wickets	Zimbabwe	Mahinda Rajapaksa International Stadium, Hambantota, Sri Lanka	20 September 2012 ‡
10 wickets	Sri Lanka	R. Premadasa Stadium, Colombo, Sri Lanka	14 September 2021
9 wickets	Pakistan	Dubai International Cricket Stadium, Dubai, UAE	13 November 2013
9 wickets	England	New Wanderers Stadium, Johannesburg, South Africa	21 February 2016
9 wickets	India	M. Chinnaswamy Stadium, Bangalore, India	22 September 2019
9 wickets	Sri Lanka	R. Premadasa Stadium, Colombo, Sri Lanka	12 September 2021
9 wickets	Afghanistan	Brian Lara Cricket Academy, San Fernando, Trinidad and Tobago	26 June 2024
9 wickets	West Indies	Boland Park, Paarl, South Africa	27 January 2026
9 wickets	West Indies	Narendra Modi Stadium, Ahmedabad, India	26 February 2026 ‡
Last updated: 1 March 2026

==== Highest successful run chases ====
South Africa holds the record for the highest successful run chase which they achieved when they scored 259/4 in response to the West Indies' 258/5.

Rank	Score	Target	Opposition	Venue	Date
1	259/4	259	West Indies	Supersports Park, Centurion, South Africa	26 March 2023
2	225/3	222	West Indies	Supersports Park, Centurion, South Africa	29 January 2026
3	212/3	212	India	Arun Jaitley Stadium, Delhi, India	10 June 2022
4	210/3	207	Pakistan	Centurion Park, Centurion, South Africa	13 December 2024
5	208/2	206	West Indies	New Wanderers Stadium, Johannesburg, South Africa	11 September 2007 ‡
Last Updated: 1 March 2026

==== Narrowest win margins (by runs) ====
The narrowest run margin victory is by 1 run which has been achieved in 15 T20I's with South Africa winning such games thrice.

Margin	Opposition	Venue	Date
1 Run	New Zealand	Lord's, London, England	9 June 2009 ‡
1 Run	West Indies	Sir Vivian Richards Stadium, Antigua, Antigua and Barbuda	20 May 2010
1 Run	England	Buffalo Park, East London, South Africa	12 February 2020
1 Run	West Indies	National Cricket Stadium, St. George's	29 June 2021
1 Run	Nepal	Arnos Vale Stadium, Kingstown	15 June 2024
Last Updated: 29 June 2021

==== Narrowest win margins (by balls remaining) ====
The narrowest winning margin by balls remaining in T20Is is by winning of the last ball which has been achieved 26 times. South Africa has achieve victory of the last ball once.

Rank	Balls remaining	Margin	Opposition	Venue	Date
1	0 balls	3 wickets	England	Sahara Park Newlands, Cape Town, South Africa	19 February 2016
2	1 ball	3 wickets	New Zealand	New Wanderers Stadium, Johannesburg, South Africa	23 November 2007
2	1 ball	4 wickets	Sri Lanka	Sharjah Cricket Stadium, Sharjah, United Arab Emirates	30 October 2021
4	2 balls	7 wickets	India	Himachal Pradesh Cricket Association Stadium, Dharamshala, India	2 October 2015
4	2 balls	5 wickets	India	Perth Stadium, Perth, Australia	30 October 2022 ‡
Last Updated: 1 March 2026

==== Narrowest win margins (by wickets) ====
The narrowest margin of victory by wickets is 1 wicket which has settled four such T20Is. The narrowest victory by wickets for South Africa is three wickets on four occasions.

Margin	Opposition	Venue	Date
3 wickets	New Zealand	New Wanderers Stadium, Johannesburg, South Africa	23 November 2007
3 wickets	Australia	New Wanderers Stadium, Johannesburg, South Africa	16 October 2011 ‡
3 wickets	England	Sahara Park Newlands, Cape Town, South Africa	19 February 2016 ‡
3 wickets	Australia	Sahara Stadium, Kingsmead, Durban, South Africa	4 March 2016
3 wickets	West Indies	Sir Vivian Richards Stadium, North Sound, Antigua and Barbuda	23 June 2024 ‡
3 wickets	India	St George's Park, Gqeberha, South Africa	10 November 2024
Last Updated: 1 March 2026

==== Greatest loss margins (by runs) ====
South Africa's biggest defeat by runs was against England during its 2025 tour of England at Manchester, Lancashire, England.

Rank	Margin	Opposition	Venue	Date
1	146 runs	England	Old Trafford Cricket Ground, Manchester, England	12 September 2025
2	135 runs	India	New Wanderers Stadium, Johannesburg, South Africa	15 November 2024
3	111 runs	Australia	Hollywoodbets Kingsmead Stadium, Durban, South Africa	30 August 2023
4	107 runs	Australia	New Wanderers Stadium, Johannesburg, South Africa	21 February 2020
5	106 runs	India	New Wanderers Stadium, Johannesburg, South Africa	14 December 2023
Last Updated: 13 September 2025

==== Greatest loss margins (by balls remaining) ====
The largest defeat suffered by South Africa was against Australia at the Melbourne Cricket Ground, Melbourne, Australia during the 2014 T20I Series during the Australian tour when they lost by 7 wickets with 44 balls remaining.

Rank	Balls remaining	Margin	Opposition	Venue	Date
1	44	7 wickets	Australia	Melbourne Cricket Ground, Melbourne, Australia	7 November 2014
2	41	9 wickets	Pakistan	Gaddafi Stadium, Lahore, Pakistan	31 October 2025
3	37	8 wickets	West Indies	Sabina Park, Kingston, Jamaica	6 May 2024
4	33	9 wickets	England	Rose Bowl, Southampton, England	21 June 2017
5	31	8 wickets	Australia	Hollywoodbets Kingsmead Stadium, Durban, South Africa	1 September 2023
Last Updated: 31 October 2025

==== Greatest loss margins (by wickets) ====
South Africa have lost a T20I match by a margin of 9 wickets on one occasion.

Rank	Margins	Opposition	Most recent venue	Date
1	9 wickets	England	Rose Bowl, Southampton, England	21 June 2017
1	9 wickets	England	Newlands Cricket Ground, Cape Town, South Africa	1 December 2020
1	9 wickets	Pakistan	Centurion Park, Centurion, South Africa	14 April 2021
1	9 wickets	Pakistan	Gaddafi Stadium, Lahore, Pakistan	31 October 2025
4	8 wickets	Australia	Ranasinghe Premadasa Stadium, Colombo, Sri Lanka	30 September 2012 ‡
4	8 wickets	New Zealand	Buffalo Park, East London, South Africa	23 December 2012
4	8 wickets	West Indies	National Cricket Stadium, St George's, Grenada	27 June 2021
Last Updated: 27 JUne 2021

==== Narrowest loss margins (by runs) ====
The narrowest loss of South Africa in terms of runs is by 1 run suffered twice.

Rank	Margin	Opposition	Venue	Date
1	1 run	England	New Wanderers Stadium, Johannesburg, South Africa	13 November 2009
1	1 run	India	Ranasinghe Premadasa Stadium, Colombo, Sri Lanka	2 October 2012 ‡
2	2 runs	England	Sahara Stadium, Kingsmead, Durban, South Africa	14 February 2020
3	3 runs	Pakistan	Gaddafi Stadium, Lahore, Pakistan	11 February 2021
3	3 runs	New Zealand	Harare Sports Club, Harare, Zimbabwe	26 July 2025
Last Updated: 19 March 2026

==== Narrowest loss margins (by balls remaining) ====
South Africa has suffered a loss off the last ball twice.

Balls remaining	Margin	Opposition	Venue	Date
0 ball	8 wickets	New Zealand	Buffalo Park, East London, South Africa	23 December 2012
0 ball	5 wickets	Australia	New Wanderers Stadium, Johannesburg, South Africa	6 March 2016
1 ball	6 wickets	India	New Wanderers Stadium, Johannesburg, South Africa	1 December 2006
1 ball	5 wickets	Sri Lanka	Sahara Park Newlands, Cape Town, South Africa	25 January 2017
1 ball	2 wickets	Australia	Sydney Cricket Ground, Sydney, Australia	9 November 2014
1 ball	4 wickets	England	Boland Park, Paarl, South Africa	29 November 2020
1 ball	4 wickets	Pakistan	New Wanderers Stadium, Johannesburg, South Africa	10 April 2021
1 ball	3 wickets	Pakistan	Centurion Park, Centurion, South Africa	16 April 2021
Last Updated: 16 April 2021

==== Narrowest loss margins (by wickets) ====
South Africa has suffered defeat by 2 wickets thrice.

Margin	Opposition	Venue	Date
2 wickets	England	Wankhede Stadium, Mumbai, India	18 March 2016 ‡
2 wickets	Pakistan	Ranasinghe Premadasa Stadium, Colombo, Sri Lanka	28 September 2012 ‡
2 wickets	Australia	Sydney Cricket Ground, Sydney, Australia	9 November 2014
3 wickets	Sri Lanka	New Wanderers Stadium, Johannesburg, South Africa	22 January 2017
3 wickets	West Indies	Vidarbha Cricket Association Stadium, Nagpur, India	25 March 2016 ‡
3 wickets	Sri Lanka	Ranasinghe Premadasa Stadium, Colombo, Sri Lanka	14 August 2018
3 wickets	Pakistan	Centurion Park, Centurion, South Africa	16 April 2021
Last Updated: 16 April 2021

==== Tied matches ====
A tie can occur when the scores of both teams are equal at the conclusion of play, provided that the side batting last has completed their innings. There have been 19 ties in T20Is history with South Africa involved in one such game. (In this case, a Super Over was used as a tie-breaker and South Africa won.)

Opposition	Venue	Date
Sri Lanka	Sahara Park Newlands, Cape Town, South Africa	19 March 2019
Last updated: 19 March 2019

== Batting records ==
=== Most career runs ===
Pakistan's Babar Azam has scored the most runs in T20Is with 4,505. Second is Rohit Sharma of India with 4,231 ahead of Virat Kohli from India in third with 4,188. Quinton de Kock is the leading South African batsmen on this list with 3,032 runs.

Rank	Runs	Player	Matches	Innings	Average	100	50	Period
1	3,032	Quinton de Kock †	106	105	31.58	2	19	2012–2026
2	2,672	David Miller †	133	118	34.25	2	8	2010–2025
3	2,504	Reeza Hendricks †	90	89	28.78	1	18	2014–2025
4	1,934	JP Duminy	81	75	38.68	0	11	2007–2019
5	1,858	Aiden Markram †	73	69	31.49	0	13	2019–2026
6	1,672	AB de Villiers	78	75	26.12	0	10	2006–2017
7	1,466	Faf du Plessis	47	47	36.65	1	10	2012–2020
8	1,406	Rassie van der Dussen	57	53	33.47	0	10	2018–2025
9	1,158	Hashim Amla	41	41	32.16	0	07	2009–2018
10	1,000	Heinrich Klaasen	58	53	23.25	0	05	2018–2024
Last Updated: 19 February 2026

=== Fastest to multiples of 1,000 runs ===
Runs	Batsman	Innings	Record Date	Reference
1,000	Faf du Plessis	32	18 March 2016	
1,000	Rassie van der Dussen	32	9 June 2022	
1,000	Aiden Markram †	32	1 September 2023	
2,000	Quinton de Kock †	71	4 October 2022	
2,000	Reeza Hendricks	71	27 September 2024	
3,000	Quinton de Kock	104	14 February 2026	

=== Most runs in each batting position ===
Batting position	Batsman	Innings	Runs	Average	Career Span	Ref
Number 1	Quinton de Kock †	52	1,397	27.94	2013–2025	
Number 2	Reeza Hendricks	57	1,658	29.6 0	2014-2025	
Number 3	Faf du Plessis	41	1,304	37.25	2012-2020	
Number 4	JP Duminy	34	1,021	44.39	2008-2019	
Number 5	David Miller †	50	1,196	36.24	2010–2026	
Number 6	David Miller †	44	916	36.64	2010–2025	
Number 7	George Linde †	15	225	17.30	2020–2026	
Number 8	Bjorn Fortuin †	11	95	19.00	2019–2025	
Number 9	Kagiso Rabada †	11	94	23.50	2015–2026	
Number 10	Lungi Ngidi †	12	32	6.40	2018–2025	
Number 11	Lungi Ngidi †	5	14	–	2017–2026	
Last Updated: 19 February 2026

=== Highest individual score ===
The third T20I of the 2018 Zimbabwe Tri-Nation Series saw Aaron Finch score the highest Individual score. Dewald Brevis holds the South African record.

Rank	Runs	Player	Opposition	Venue	Date
1	125*	Dewald Brevis	Australia	Marrara Oval, Darwin, Australia	12 August 2025
2	119	Faf du Plessis	West Indies	New Wanderers Stadium, Johannesburg, South Africa	11 January 2015
3	117*	Richard Levi	New Zealand	Seddon Park, Hamilton, New Zealand	19 February 2012
4	117	Reeza Hendricks	Pakistan	SuperSport Park, Centurion, South Africa	13 December 2024
5	115	Quinton De Kock	West Indies	Centurion Park, Centurion, South Africa	29 January 2026
Last Updated: 22 February 2026

=== Highest individual score – progression of record ===
Runs	Player	Opponent	Venue	Season
61	Graeme Smith	New Zealand	New Wanderers Stadium, Johannesburg, South Africa	21 October 2005
89*	Graeme Smith	Australia	New Wanderers Stadium, Johannesburg, South Africa	24 February 2006
90*	Herschelle Gibbs	West Indies	New Wanderers Stadium, Johannesburg, South Africa	11 September 2007 ‡
94	Loots Bosman	England	Centurion Park, Centurion, South Africa	15 November 2009
96*	JP Duminy	Zimbabwe	De Beers Diamond Oval, Kimberley, South Africa	10 October 2010
117*	Richard Levi	New Zealand	Seddon Park, Hamilton, New Zealand	19 February 2012
119	Faf du Plessis	West Indies	New Wanderers Stadium, Johannesburg, South Africa	11 January 2015
125*	Dewald Brevis	Australia	Marrara Oval, Darwin, Australia	12 August 2025
Last Updated: 12 August 2025

=== Highest scores at each batting position ===
Batting position	Player	Score	Opponent	Venue	Date
Opener	Richard Levi	117*	New Zealand	Seddon Park, Hamilton, New Zealand	19 February 2012
Number 3	Faf du Plessis	119	West Indies	Wanderers Stadium, Johannesburg, South Africa	11 January 2015
Number 4	Dewald Brevis	125*	Australia	Marrara Oval, Darwin, Australia	12 August 2025
Number 5	David Miller	106*	India	Assam Cricket Association Stadium, Guwahati, India	2 October 2022
Number 6	David Miller	85*	Pakistan	Gaddafi Stadium, Lahore, Pakistan	14 February 2021
Number 7	Chris Morris	55*	Pakistan	Centurion Park, Centurion, South Africa	6 February 2019
Number 8	Keshav Maharaj	41	India	The Sports Hub, Thiruvananthapuram, India	28 September 2022
Number 9	Rusty Theron	31*	Australia	Wanderers Stadium, Johannesburg South Africa	16 October 2011
Number 10	Kwena Maphaka	12*	Pakistan	Kingsmead Stadium, Durban, South Africa	10 December 2024
Number 11	Lungi Ngidi	7*	Pakistan	Gaddafi Stadium, Lahore, Pakistan	31 October 2025
Last updated: 29 January 2026

=== Highest career average ===
A batsman's batting average is the total number of runs they have scored divided by the number of times they have been dismissed.

Rank	Average	Player	Innings	Not out	Runs	Period
1	38.68	JP Duminy	75	25	1,934	2007–2019
2	36.65	Faf du Plessis	47	7	1,466	2012–2020
3	35.05	Jacques Kallis	23	4	666	2005–2012
4	34.86	Rilee Rossouw	27	5	767	2014–2023
5	34.11	David Miller †	121	40	2,763	2018–2026
Qualification: 20 innings. Last Updated: 19 March 2026

=== Highest average in each batting position ===
Batting position	Batsman	Innings	Runs	Average	Career Span	Ref
Opener	Jacques Kallis	14	496	41.33	2005-2012	
Number 3	Rilee Rossouw	16	534	38.14	2014–2023	
Number 4	JP Duminy	34	1,021	44.39	2008–2019	
Number 5	JP Duminy	21	531	44.25	2008–2017	
Number 6	David Miller †	41	842	36.60	2010–2024	
Number 7	Albie Morkel	12	221	24.55	2007–2015	
Number 8	Kagiso Rabada †	15	85	12.14	2015-2024	
Number 9	Kagiso Rabada †	8	71	35.50	2015–2024	
Number 10	Lungi Ngidi †	10	23	4.60	2018–2024	
Number 11	Tabraiz Shamsi †	12	10	2.50	2017–2023	
Qualification:- Minimum 10 Innings, Last Updated: 11 November 2024

=== Most half-centuries ===
A half-century is a score of between 50 and 99 runs. Statistically, once a batsman's score reaches 100, it is no longer considered a half-century but a century.

Virat Kohli of India has scored the most half-centuries in T20Is with 24. He is followed by India's Rohit Sharma on 21, Ireland's Paul Stirling on 18 and Australia's David Warner on 17. Duminy has the most half-centuries for South Africa

Rank	Half centuries	Player	Innings	Runs	Period
1	18	Reeza Hendricks †	82	2,382	2014–2025
2	17	Quinton de Kock †	91	2,584	2012–2024
3	11	JP Duminy	75	1,934	2007–2019
3	11	Faf du Plessis	47	1,466	2012–2020
5	10	AB de Villiers	75	1,672	2006–2017
5	10	David Miller †	112	2,550	2010–2024
5	10	Rassie van der Dussen †	53	1,406	2018–2025
Last Updated: 23 August 2025

=== Most centuries ===
A century is a score of 100 or more runs in a single innings.

Rohit Sharma has scored the most centuries in T20Is with 4. Four South African's have one century apiece.

Rank	Centuries	Player	Innings	Runs	Period
1	2	Rilee Rossouw	27	767	2014–2023
1	2	David Miller †	99	2,227	2010–2023
3	1	Morne van Wyk	7	225	2007-2015
3	1	Richard Levi	13	236	2012-2012
3	1	Faf du Plessis	47	1,466	2012-2020
3	1	Quinton de Kock †	79	2,277	2012–2023
Last Updated: 17 March 2024

=== Most Sixes ===
Rank	Sixes	Player	Innings	Runs	Period
1	139	David Miller †	120	2,757	2010–2026
2	132	Quinton de Kock †	108	3,085	2012–2026
3	82	Aiden Markram †	72	1,948	2019–2026
4	71	JP Duminy	75	1,934	2007–2019
5	70	Reeza Hendricks †	89	2,504	2014–2025
Last Updated: 1 March 2026

=== Most Fours ===
Rank	Fours	Player	Innings	Runs	Period
1	312	Quinton de Kock †	108	3,085	2012–2026
2	268	Reeza Hendricks †	89	2,504	2014–2025
3	182	Aiden Markram †	72	1,948	2019–2026
3	182	David Miller †	120	2,757	2010–2026
5	140	AB de Villiers	75	1,672	2006–2017
Last Updated: 1 March 2026

=== Highest strike rates ===
Abhishek Sharma of India holds the record for highest strike rate, with minimum 250 balls faced qualification, with 190.46. Dewald Brevis is the South African with the highest strike rate.

Rank	Strike rate	Player	Runs	Balls Faced	Period
1	163.23	Dewald Brevis †	697	427	2023–2026
2	159.79	Rilee Rossouw	767	480	2014–2023
3	150.30	Ryan Rickelton †	741	293	2024–2026
4	147.61	George Linde †	403	273	2020–2026
5	147.59	Aiden Markram †	1,966	1,332	2019–2026
Qualification= 250 balls faced. Last Updated: 27 March 2026

=== Highest strike rates in an innings ===
Marco Jansen with his innings of 54 off 17 balls against India in November 2024 during the India's tour of South Africa in 2024–25 holds the top position for a South Africa player in this list.

Rank	Strike rate	Player	Runs	Balls Faced	Opposition	Venue	Date
1	317.64	Marco Jansen	54	17	India	Centurion Park, Centurion, South Africa	13 November 2024
2	295.45	Quinton de Kock	65	22	England	Kingsmead Cricket Ground, Durban, South Africa	14 February 2020
3	280.55	David Miller	101*	36	Bangladesh	JB Marks Oval, Potchefstroom, South Africa	29 October 2017
4	275.00	George Linde	33	12	New Zealand	Seddon Park, Hamilton, New Zealand	17 March 2026
5	270.00	Aiden Markram	27	10	Ireland	Bristol County Ground, Bristol, England	5 August 2022
Last Updated: 19 March 2026

=== Most runs in a calendar year ===
Paul Stirling of Ireland holds the record for most runs scored in a calendar year with 748 runs scored in 2019. Graeme Smith scored 316 runs in 2010, the most for a South Africa batsmen in a year.

Rank	Runs	Player	Matches	Innings	Year
1	570	Aiden Markram	18	16	2021
2	569	Reeza Hendricks	22	22	2024
3	524	Quinton de Kock	14	14	2021
4	464	Reeza Hendricks	17	17	2025
5	431	Tristan Stubbs	18	16	2024
Last Updated: 22 February 2026

=== Most runs in a series ===
The 2014 ICC World Twenty20 in Bangladesh saw Virat Kohli set the record for the most runs scored in a single series scoring 319 runs. He is followed by Tillakaratne Dilshan with 317 runs scored in the 2009 ICC World Twenty20. For twelve years Jacques Kallis held the record for the most runs scored in a series for a South Africa batsmen, having scored 238 runs in the 2009 ICC World Twenty20. The record was broken by Quinton de Kock, scoring 255 runs in a five-match series in the West Indies in 2021. That record was eventually broken by Aiden Markram in the ongoing 2026 Men's T20 World Cup, having scored 264 runs so far.

Rank	Runs	Player	Matches	Innings	Series
1	286	Aiden Markram†	8	8	2026 Men's T20 World Cup
2	255	Quinton de Kock	5	5	South Africa in West Indies in 2021
3	243	Quinton de Kock	9	9	2024 Men's T20 World Cup
4	238	Jacques Kallis	5	5	2009 ICC World Twenty20
5	228	Ryan Rickelton†	8	8	2026 Men's T20 World Cup
Last Updated: 19 March 2026

=== Most ducks ===
A duck refers to a batsman being dismissed without scoring a run. Sri Lanka's Dasun Shanaka has scored the highest number of ducks in T20Is with 16 such knocks. Quinton de Kock with 10 ducks has the highest number of such knocks for South Africa.

Rank	Ducks	Player	Matches	Innings	Period
1	10	Quinton de Kock†	109	108	2012–2026
2	7	Reeza Hendricks†	90	89	2014–2025
2	7	Andile Phehlukwayo†	42	25	2017–2024
4	6	Temba Bavuma†	36	35	2019–2023
4	6	JP Duminy	81	75	2007–2019
Last Updated: 1 March 2026

== Bowling records ==
=== Most career wickets ===
A bowler takes the wicket of a batsman when the form of dismissal is bowled, caught, leg before wicket, stumped or hit wicket. If the batsman is dismissed by run out, obstructing the field, handling the ball, hitting the ball twice or timed out the bowler does not receive credit.

Rashid Khan, captain of Afghanistan, is the highest wicket-taker in T20Is. Tabraiz Shamsi is the highest wicket-taker in T20I for South Africa with 89 wickets .

Rank	Wickets	Player	Matches	Innings	Average	SR	Period
1	89	Tabraiz Shamsi†	70	70	20.89	16.95	2017–2024
2	86	Lungi Ngidi†	61	60	20.58	14.10	2017–2026
3	80	Kagiso Rabada†	77	76	28.70	20.30	2014–2026
4	64	Dale Steyn	47	47	18.35	15.85	2007–2020
5	61	Imran Tahir	35	35	14.08	12.86	2013–2019
6	59	Wayne Parnell	56	55	25.64	18.5	2009–2023
7	55	Anrich Nortje†	46	45	21.05	17.3	2019–2026
8	50	Andile Phehlukwayo	42	39	22.24	14.9	2017–2024
9	46	Morné Morkel	41	41	23.84	19.1	2007–2017
10	45	Keshav Maharaj†	47	46	26.44	20.9	2021–2026
Last Updated: 22 February 2026

==== Most wickets against each team ====
Opposition	Wickets	Player	Matches	Innings	Span	Ref
Afghanistan	5	Kagiso Rabada†	3	3	2016–2026	
Australia	14	Kagiso Rabada†	13	13	2014–2025	
Bangladesh	9	Anrich Nortje†	3	3	2021–2024	
Canada	4	Lungi Ngidi†	1	1	2026–2026	
England	19	Lungi Ngidi†	9	9	2020–2022	
India	16	Lungi Ngidi†	10	9	2022–2026	
Ireland	10	Tabraiz Shamsi†	4	4	2021–2022	
Namibia	2	Nandre Burger	1	1	2025–2025	
Namibia	2	Andile Simelane	1	1	2025–2025	
Nepal	4	Tabraiz Shamsi†	1	1	2024–2024	
Netherlands	4	Ottneil Baartman†	1	1	2024–2024	
Netherlands	4	Imran Tahir	1	1	2014–2014	
New Zealand	10	Morne Morkel	9	9	2007–2015	
Pakistan	13	Tabraiz Shamsi†	11	11	2019–2022	
Scotland	2	Albie Morkel	1	1	2009–2009	
Scotland	2	Johan Botha	1	1	2009–2009	
Scotland	2	Roelof van der Merwe	1	1	2009–2009	
Scotland	2	Dale Steyn	1	1	2009–2009	
Sri Lanka	14	Imran Tahir	9	9	2013–2019	
United Arab Emirates	3	Corbin Bosch†	1	1	2026–2026	
United States	3	Kagiso Rabada†	1	1	2024–2024	
West Indies	13	Kagiso Rabada†	13	13	2015–2025	
Zimbabwe	7	Lungi Ngidi†	5	5	2018–2025	
Last updated: 22 February 2026

=== Best figures in an innings ===
Bowling figures refers to the number of the wickets a bowler has taken and the number of runs conceded. India's Deepak Chahar holds the world record for best figures in an innings when he took 6/7 against Bangladesh in November 2019 at Nagpur. Ryan McLaren holds the South African record for best bowling figures.

Rank	Figures	Player	Opposition	Venue	Date
1	5/17	Dwaine Pretorius	Pakistan	Gaddafi Stadium, Lahore, Pakistan	13 February 2021 ‡
2	5/19	Ryan McLaren	West Indies	Sir Vivian Richards Stadium, Antigua, Antigua and Barbuda	19 May 2010 ‡
3	5/23	David Wiese	West Indies	Sahara Stadium, Kingsmead, Durban, South Africa	14 January 2015
3	5/23	Imran Tahir	Zimbabwe	Buffalo Park, East London, South Africa	9 October 2018
5	5/24	Imran Tahir	New Zealand	Eden Park, Auckland, New Zealand	17 February 2017
5	5/24	Tabraiz Shamsi	England	The Rose Bowl, Southampton, England	31 July 2022 ‡
Last Updated: 31 July 2022

=== Best figures in an innings – progression of record ===
Figures	Player	Opposition	Venue	Date
2/14	Charl Langeveldt	New Zealand	New Wanderers Stadium, Johannesburg, South Africa	21 October 2005
3/22	Andrew Hall	Australia	New Wanderers Stadium, Johannesburg, South Africa	24 February 2006
4/17	Morne Morkel	New Zealand	Sahara Stadium, Kingsmead, Durban, South Africa	19 September 2007 ‡
4/9	Dale Steyn	West Indies	Axxess DSL St. Georges, Port Elizabeth, South Africa	16 December 2007
5/19	Ryan McLaren	West Indies	Sir Vivian Richards Stadium, Antigua, Antigua and Barbuda	19 May 2010
5/17	Dwaine Pretorius	Pakistan	Gaddafi Stadium, Lahore, Pakistan	13 February 2021 ‡
Last Updated: 14 February 2021

=== Best Bowling Figure against each opponent ===
Opposition	Player	Figures	Date
Afghanistan	Morne Morkel	4/20	5 May 2010 ‡
Australia	Kwena Maphaka	4/20	10 August 2025
Bangladesh	Anrich Nortje	4/10	27 October 2022
England	Tabraiz Shamsi	5/24	31 July 2022
India	Marco Jansen	4/22	22 February 2026 ‡
Ireland	Wayne Parnell	5/30	6 August 2022
Netherlands	Ottneil Baartman	4/11	8 June 2024 ‡
New Zealand	Imran Tahir	5/24	17 February 2017
Pakistan	Dwaine Pretorius	5/17	13 February 2021
Scotland	Albie Morkel	2/15	7 June 2009 ‡
Sri Lanka	Anrich Nortje	4/7	3 June 2024 ‡
West Indies	Ryan McLaren	5/19	19 May 2010
Zimbabwe	Imran Tahir	5/23	9 October 2018
Last updated: 19 March 2026.

=== Best career average ===
A bowler's bowling average is the total number of runs they have conceded divided by the number of wickets they have taken. Afghanistan's Rashid Khan holds the record for the best career average in T20Is with 12.62. Ajantha Mendis, Sri Lankan cricketer, is second behind Rashid with an overall career average of 14.42 runs per wicket. Imran Tahir with an average of 14.08 is the highest-ranked South African bowler.

Rank	Average	Player	Wickets	Runs	Balls	Period
1	14.08	Imran Tahir	61	859	785	2013-2019
2	18.35	Dale Steyn	64	1,175	1015	2007-2020
3	20.71	Tabraiz Shamsi †	57	1,181	1,050	2017-2021
4	21.15	Andile Phehlukwayo †	40	846	604	2017-2021
5	22.24	Johan Botha	37	823	774	2006-2012
Qualification: 500 balls. Last Updated: 6 November 2021

=== Best career economy rate ===
A bowler's economy rate is the total number of runs they have conceded divided by the number of overs they have bowled. New Zealand's Daniel Vettori, holds the T20I record for the best career economy rate with 5.70. Johan Botha, with a rate of 6.38 runs per over conceded over his T20I career, is the highest South African on the list.

Rank	Economy rate	Player	Wickets	Runs	Balls	Period
1	6.37	Johan Botha	37	823	774	2006-2012
2	6.56	Imran Tahir	61	859	785	2013-2019
3	6.74	Tabraiz Shamsi †	57	1,181	1,050	2017-2021
4	6.94	Dale Steyn	64	1,175	1,015	2007-2020
5	7.47	Morne Morkel	46	1,097	880	2007-2017
Qualification: 500 balls. Last Updated: 14 September 2021

=== Best career strike rate ===
A bowler's strike rate is the total number of balls they have bowled divided by the number of wickets they have taken. With the best T20I career strike rate, the top bowler is Rashid Khan of Afghanistan with 12.3 balls per wicket strike rate. Imran Tahir is the South African bowler with the lowest strike rate.

Rank	Strike rate	Player	Wickets	Runs	Balls	Period
1	12.8	Imran Tahir	61	859	785	2013-2019
2	15.1	Andile Phehlukwayo †	40	846	604	2017-2021
3	15.8	Dale Steyn	64	1,175	1,015	2007-2020
4	17.7	Kagiso Rabada †	49	1,245	871	2014-2021
5	18.2	Wayne Parnell	41	1,038	649	2009-2017
Qualification: 500 balls. Last Updated: 6 November 2021

=== Most four-wickets (& over) hauls in an innings ===
Pakistan's Umar Gul has taken the most four-wickets (or over) among all the bowlers. Imran Tahir has taken the most such hauls among South African bowlers.

Rank	Four-wicket hauls	Player	Matches	Balls	Wickets	Period
1	4	Imran Tahir	35	785	61	2013-2019
2	3	Lungi Ngidi†	34	672	57	2017-2022
2	3	Tabraiz Shamsi†	58	1,264	72	2017-2022
4	2	Morne Morkel	41	880	46	2007-2017
4	2	Wayne Parnell†	51	989	56	2017-2022
4	2	Dale Steyn	47	1,015	64	2007-2020
Last Updated: 31 October 2022

=== Best economy rates in an innings ===
The best economy rate in an innings, when a minimum of 12 balls are delivered by the bowler, is Sri Lankan player Nuwan Kulasekara economy of 0.00 during his spell of 0 runs for 1 wicket in 2 overs against the Netherlands at Zohur Ahmed Chowdhury Stadium in the 2014 ICC World Twenty20. Dale Steyn holds the South African record during his spell in 2010 ICC World Twenty20 at Kensington Oval, Bridgetown, Barbados against Afghanistan and by Robin Peterson against New Zealand during the New Zealand cricket team in South Africa in 2012-13.

Economy	Player	Overs	Runs	Wickets	Opposition	Venue	Date
2.00	Dale Steyn	3	6	2	Afghanistan	Kensington Oval, Bridgetown, Barbados	5 May 2010 ‡
2.00	Robin Peterson	4	8	2	New Zealand	Sahara Stadium, Kingsmead, Durban, South Africa	21 December 2012
2.00	Aiden Markram	2	4	1	Sri Lanka	R. Premadasa Stadium, Colombo, Sri Lanka	14 September 2021
2.25	Dale Steyn	4	9	1	Zimbabwe	Mahinda Rajapaksa International Stadium, Hambantota, Sri Lanka	20 September 2012 ‡
2.25	Lonwabo Tsotsobe	4	9	2	Pakistan	Dubai International Cricket Stadium, Dubai, UAE	13 November 2013
Qualification: 12 balls bowled. Last Updated: 14 September 2021

=== Best strike rates in an innings ===
The best strike rate in an innings, when a minimum of 4 wickets are taken by the player, is by Steve Tikolo of Kenya during his spell of 4/2 in 1.2 overs against Scotland during the 2013 ICC World Twenty20 Qualifier at ICC Academy, Dubai, UAE. Dale Steyn, Morne Morkel and Andile Phehlukwayo have the best strike rate for a South African bowler.

Strike rate	Player	Wickets	Runs	Balls	Opposition	Venue	Date
4.50	Dale Steyn	4	9	18	West Indies	Axxess DSL St. Georges, Port Elizabeth, South Africa	16 December 2007
4.50	Morne Morkel	4	20	18	Afghanistan	Kensington Oval, Bridgetown, Barbados	5 May 2010 ‡
4.50	Andile Phehlukwayo †	4	24	18	Sri Lanka	New Wanderers Stadium, Johannesburg, South Africa	24 March 2019
4.60	Ryan McLaren	5	19	23	West Indies	Sir Vivian Richards Stadium, Antigua, Antigua and Barbuda	19 May 2010 ‡
4.60	Imran Tahir †	5	24	23	New Zealand	Eden Park, Auckland, New Zealand	17 February 2017
Last Updated: 9 August 2020

=== Worst figures in an innings ===
Rank	Figures	Player	Overs	Opposition	Venue	Date
1	0/70	Kagiso Rabada	4	England	Old Trafford, Manchester, England	12 September 2025
2	0/67	Sisanda Magala	4	West Indies	Centurion Park, Centurion, South Africa	26 March 2023
3	0/62	Lizaad Williams	3	England	Old Trafford, Manchester, England	12 September 2025
4	0/60	Marco Jansen	4	England	Old Trafford, Manchester, England	12 September 2025
5	0/59	Anrich Nortje	3	West Indies	Centurion Park, Centurion, South Africa	29 January 2026
Last Updated: 19 March 2026

=== Most runs conceded in a match ===
Rank	Figures	Player	Overs	Opposition	Venue	Date
1	0/70	Kagiso Rabada	4	England	Old Trafford, Manchester, England	12 September 2025
2	1/68	Kyle Abbott	4	West Indies	New Wanderers Stadium, Johannesburg, South Africa	11 January 2015
3	0/67	Sisanda Magala	4	West Indies	Centurion Park, Centurion, South Africa	26 March 2023
4	1/63	Andile Phehlukwayo	4	England	New Wanderers Stadium, Johannesburg, South Africa	27 July 2022
5	0/62	Lizaad Williams	3	England	Old Trafford, Manchester, England	12 September 2025
Last updated: 12 September 2025

=== Most wickets in a calendar year ===
Australia's Andrew Tye holds the record for most wickets taken in a year when he took 31 wickets in 2018 in 19 T20Is. Tabraiz Shamsi has so far taken 24 wickets in 2021, the most among South African bowlers.

Rank	Wickets	Player	Matches	Year
1	36	Tabraiz Shamsi	22	2021
2	22	Lungi Ngidi†	11	2022
3	18	Kagiso Rabada	14	2021
4	17	Lungi Ngidi	9	2020
4	17	Anrich Nortje†	13	2022
Last Updated: 6 November 2022

=== Most wickets in a series ===
2019 ICC World Twenty20 Qualifier at UAE saw records set for the most wickets taken by a bowler in a T20I series when Oman's pacer Bilal Khan tool 18 wickets during the series. Imran Tahir in the 2014 ICC World Twenty20 took 12 wickets, the most for a South African bowler in a series.

Rank	Wickets	Player	Matches	Series
1	15	Anrich Nortje	9	2024 Men's T20 World Cup
2	13	Kagiso Rabada	9	2024 Men's T20 World Cup
3	12	Imran Tahir	5	2014 ICC World Twenty20
3	12	Lungi Ngidi	7	2026 Men's T20 World Cup
4	11	Anrich Nortje	5	2022 Men's T20 World Cup
4	11	Charl Langeveldt	4	2010 ICC World Twenty20
4	11	Tabriaz Shamsi	5	2024 Men's T20 World Cup
4	11	Keshav Maharaj	8	2024 Men's T20 World Cup
4	11	Corbin Bosch	7	2026 Men's T20 World Cup
4	11	Marco Jansen	6	2026 Men's T20 World Cup
Last Updated: 19 March 2026

=== Hat-trick ===
In cricket, a hat-trick occurs when a bowler takes three wickets with consecutive deliveries. The deliveries may be interrupted by an over bowled by another bowler from the other end of the pitch or the other team's innings, but must be three consecutive deliveries by the individual bowler in the same match. Only wickets attributed to the bowler count towards a hat-trick; run outs do not count. In T20Is history there have been just 13 hat-tricks, the first achieved by Brett Lee for Australia against Bangladesh in 2007 ICC World Twenty20.

S. No	Bowler	Against	Wickets	Venue	Date	Ref.
1	Kagiso Rabada	England	Chris Woakes (c Anrich Nortje); Eoin Morgan (c Keshav Maharaj); Chris Jordan (c David Miller)	(United Arab Emirates) Sharjah Cricket Stadium, Sharjah	6 November 2021	
Last Updated: 6 November 2021

== Wicket-keeping records ==
The wicket-keeper is a specialist fielder who stands behind the stumps being guarded by the batsman on strike and is the only member of the fielding side allowed to wear gloves and leg pads.

=== Most career dismissals ===
A wicket-keeper can be credited with the dismissal of a batsman in two ways, caught or stumped. A fair catch is taken when the ball is caught fully within the field of play without it bouncing after the ball has touched the striker's bat or glove holding the bat, Laws 5.6.2.2 and 5.6.2.3 state that the hand or the glove holding the bat shall be regarded as the ball striking or touching the bat while a stumping occurs when the wicket-keeper puts down the wicket while the batsman is out of his ground and not attempting a run. Quinton de Kock is the highest ranked South African wicket keeper in the all-time list of taking most dismissals in T20Is as a designated wicket-keeper, which is headed by India's MS Dhoni and West Indian Denesh Ramdin.

Rank	Dismissals	Player	Matches	Innings	Period
1	92	Quinton de Kock†	80	79	2012-2023
2	28	AB de Villiers	78	26	2006-2016
3	19	Mark Boucher	25	25	2005-2010
4	17	Heinrich Klaasen †	41	16	2018-2023
5	8	Mangaliso Mosehle	7	7	2017-2017
Last updated: 2 April 2023

=== Most career catches ===
Quinton de Kock has taken the most catches in T20Is as a designated wicket-keeper among South Africans with Dhoni and Ramdin leading the all-time list.

Rank	Catches	Player	Matches	Innings	Period
1	76	Quinton de Kock †	80	79	2012-2023
2	21	AB de Villiers	78	26	2006-2016
3	18	Mark Boucher	25	25	2005-2010
4	14	Heinrich Klaasen †	41	16	2018-2023
5	6	Mangaliso Mosehle	7	7	2017-2017
Last Updated: 2 April 2023

=== Most career stumpings ===
Quinton de Kock has made the most stumpings in T20Is as a designated wicket-keeper among South African wicket-keepers with Dhoni and Kamran Akmal of Pakistan heading this all-time list.

Rank	Stumpings	Player	Matches	Innings	Period
1	16	Quinton de Kock †	80	79	2012-2023
2	7	AB de Villiers	78	26	2006-2016
3	3	Heinrich Klaasen †	41	16	2018-2023
4	2	Mangaliso Mosehle	7	7	2017-2017
5	1	Mark Boucher	25	25	2005-2010
5	1	Morne van Wyk	8	5	2015-2015
5	1	David Miller †	85	1	2019-2021
Last Updated: 2 April 2023

=== Most dismissals in an innings ===
Four wicket-keepers on four occasions have taken five dismissals in a single innings in a T20I.

The feat of taking 4 dismissals in an innings has been achieved by 19 wicket-keepers on 26 occasions with Gilchrist being the only Australian wicket-keeper.

Dismissals	Player	Opposition	Venue	Date
4	AB de Villiers	West Indies	Sir Vivian Richards Stadium, Antigua, Antigua and Barbuda	19 May 2010
4	AB de Villiers	Zimbabwe	Mahinda Rajapaksa International Stadium, Hambantota, Sri Lanka	20 September 2012
4	Quinton de Kock †	Pakistan	Dubai International Cricket Stadium, Dubai, UAE	13 November 2013
4	Quinton de Kock †	Afghanistan	Wankhede Stadium, Mumbai, India	20 March 2016
4	Quinton de Kock †	England	Rose Bowl, Southampton, England	28 July 2022
Last Updated: 31 July 2022

=== Most dismissals in a series ===
Netherlands wicket-keeper Scott Edwards holds the T20Is record for the most dismissals taken by a wicket-keeper in a series. He made 13 dismissals during the 2019 ICC World Twenty20 Qualifier.

Rank	Dismissals	Player	Matches	Innings	Series
1	9	AB de Villiers	5	5	2012 ICC World Twenty20
1	9	Quinton de Kock †	8	8	2026 Men's T20 World Cup
2	8	Quinton de Kock †	3	3	South Africa in England in 2022
2	8	Quinton de Kock †	5	5	2014 ICC World Twenty20
2	8	Quinton de Kock †	9	9	2024 Men's T20 World Cup
Last Updated: 19 March 2026

== Fielding records ==
=== Most career catches ===
Caught is one of the nine methods a batsman can be dismissed in cricket. (Note: In 2017, The Laws of Cricket were amended, reducing the methods of dismissals from ten to nine, with handled the ball now covered as part of obstructing the field.) The majority of catches are caught in the slips, located behind the batsman, next to the wicket-keeper, on the off side of the field. Most slip fielders are top order batsmen.

South Africa's David Miller holds the record for the most catches in T20Is by a non-wicket-keeper with 62, followed by Shoaib Malik of Pakistan on 50 and New Zealand's Martin Guptill with 47.

Rank	Catches	Player	Matches	Innings	Ct/Inn	Period
1	78 ♠	David Miller†	124	123	0.634	2010–2024
2	44	AB de Villiers	78	52	0.846	2007-2017
3	37	Aiden Markram†	55	55	0.672	2019–2023
4	35	JP Duminy	81	81	0.432	2007-2019
5	32	Reeza Hendricks†	74	74	0.432	2014–2024
Last Updated: 11 November 2024

=== Most catches in an innings ===
The feat of taking 4 catches in an innings has been achieved by 14 fielders on 14 occasions with David Miller being the only South African fielder.

Dismissals	Player	Opposition	Venue	Date
4 ♠	David Miller †	Pakistan	Sahara Park Newlands, Cape Town, South Africa	1 February 2019
3	AB de Villiers	India	Trent Bridge, Nottingham, England	16 June 2009 ‡
3	Herschelle Gibbs	New Zealand	Kensington Oval, Bridgetown, Barbados	6 May 2010 ‡
3	Justin Ontong	New Zealand	Axxess DSL St. Georges, Port Elizabeth, South Africa	26 December 2012
3	David Miller †	England	Zohur Ahmed Chowdhury Stadium, Chittagong, Bangladesh	29 March 2014 ‡
3	Justin Ontong	West Indies	Sahara Stadium, Kingsmead, Durban, South Africa	14 January 2015
3	Rilee Rossouw	Bangladesh	Sher-e-Bangla National Cricket Stadium, Mirpur, Bangladesh	7 July 2015
3	David Miller †	Sri Lanka	New Wanderers Stadium, Johannesburg, South Africa	24 March 2019
3	David Miller †	England	Buffalo Park, East London, South Africa	12 February 2020
3	Temba Bavuma	England	Sahara Stadium, Kingsmead, Durban, South Africa	14 February 2020
3	George Linde	Pakistan	New Wanderers Stadium, Johannesburg, South Africa	12 April 2021
3	David Miller †	England	Sharjah Cricket Stadium, Sharjah, UAE	6 November 2021 ‡
Last Updated: 6 November 2021

=== Most catches in a series ===
The 2019 ICC Men's T20 World Cup Qualifier, which saw Netherlands retain their title, saw the record set for the most catches taken by a non-wicket-keeper in a T20I series. Jersey's Ben Stevens and Namibia's JJ Smit took 10 catches in the series.

Catches	Player	Matches	Innings	Series
8	Aiden Markram	9	9	2024 Men's T20 World Cup
7	Tristan Stubbs	8	8	2026 Men's T20 World Cup
7	Tristan Stubbs	9	9	2024 Men's T20 World Cup
6	AB de Villiers	5	5	2007 ICC World Twenty20
6	Heinrich Klaasen	9	9	2024 Men's T20 World Cup
Last Updated: 19 March 2026

== Other records ==
=== Most career matches ===
India's Rohit Sharma holds the record for the most T20I matches played with 159, followed by Paul Stirling with 145 and George Dockrell of Ireland with 139 games. David Miller is the most experienced South African player having represented the team on 122 occasions.

Rank	Matches	Player	Period
1	137	David Miller	2010–2026
2	110	Quinton de Kock	2012–2026
3	90	Reeza Hendricks	2014-2025
4	81	JP Duminy	2007-2019
5	79	Kagiso Rabada	2014–2024
Last Updated: 9 April 2026

=== Most consecutive career matches ===
Afghanistan's Mohammad Shahzad and Asghar Afghan hold the record for the most consecutive T20I matches played with 58. Duminy holds the South African record.

Rank	Matches	Player	Period
1	33	JP Duminy	2007-2012
2	28	Albie Morkel	2006-2010
3	27	Tabraiz Shamsi	2019-2021
4	26	David Miller	2017-2020
5	25	Reeza Hendricks	2013-2024
Last updated: 19 March 2026

=== Most matches as captain ===
MS Dhoni, who led the Indian cricket team from 2007 to 2016, holds the record for the most matches played as captain in T20Is with 72. Faf du PLessis has led South Africa in 37 matches, the most for any player from his country.

Rank	Matches	Player	Won	Lost	Tied	NR	Win %	Period
1	46	Aiden Markram†	23	22	1	0	50.00	2023-2026
2	37	Faf du Plessis	23	13	1	0	63.51	2012-2019
3	27	Graeme Smith	18	9	0	0	66.67	2005-2010
4	25	Temba Bavuma	15	9	0	1	62.50	2021-2022
5	18	AB de Villiers	8	9	0	1	47.06	2012-2017
Last Updated: 19 March 2026

=== Most man of the match awards ===
Rank	M.O.M	Player	Matches	Period
1	9	Tabraiz Shamsi†	70	2017–2024
1	9	David Miller†	124	2010–2024
3	7	AB de Villiers	78	2006–2017
4	6	Quinton de Kock†	92	2012–2024
5	5	JP Duminy	81	2007–2019
Last Updated: 11 November 2024

=== Most man of the series awards ===
Rank	M.O.S	Player	Matches	Period
1	3	Reeza Hendricks†	51	2014–2023
1	3	Quinton de Kock†	80	2012–2023
1	3	David Miller†	111	2010–2023
4	2	Faf du Plessis	47	2012–2020
5	1	Imran Tahir	35	2013–2019
5	1	Johan Botha	40	2006–2012
5	1	Tabraiz Shamsi†	61	2017–2023
5	1	JP Duminy	81	2007–2019
Last Updated: 29 March 2023

=== Youngest players on Debut ===
The youngest player to play in a T20I match is Marian Gherasim at the age of 14 years and 16 days. Making his debut for Romania against the Bulgaria on 16 October 2020 in the first T20I of the 2020 Balkan Cup thus becoming the youngest to play in a men's T20I match.

Rank	Age	Player	Opposition	Venue	Date
1	18 years and 135 days	Kwena Maphaka	West Indies	Brian Lara Cricket Academy, Tarouba, Trinidad and Tobago	23 August 2024
2	19 years and 164 days	Kagiso Rabada	Australia	Adelaide Oval, Adelaide, Australia	5 November 2014
3	19 years and 167 days	Wayne Parnell	Australia	The Gabba, Brisbane, Australia	13 January 2009
4	20 years and 4 days	Quinton de Kock	New Zealand	Kingsmead, Durban, South Africa	21 December 2012
5	20 years and 40 days	Sinethemba Qeshile	Sri Lanka	Centurion Park, Centurion, South Africa	22 March 2019
Last Updated: 12 February 2021

=== Oldest Players on Debut ===
The Turkish batsmen Osman Göker is the oldest player to make their debut a T20I match. Playing in the 2019 Continental Cup against Romania at Moara Vlasiei Cricket Ground, Moara Vlăsiei he was aged 59 years and 181 days.

Rank	Age	Player	Opposition	Venue	Date
1	34 years and 128 days	Imran Tahir	Sri Lanka	R.Premadasa Stadium, Colombo, Sri Lanka	2 August 2013
2	33 years and 312 days	Pite van Biljon	Australia	New Wanderers Stadium, Johannesburg, South Africa	21 February 2020
3	33 years and 29 days	Robbie Frylinck	Bangladesh	Mangaung Oval, Bloemfontein, South Africa	26 October 2017
4	32 years and 337 days	Henry Davids	New Zealand	Kingsmead, Durban, South Africa	12 December 2012
5	32 years and 334 days	Roger Telemachus	Australia	New Wanderers Stadium, Johannesburg, South Africa	24 February 2006
Last Updated: 12 February 2021

=== Oldest Players ===
The Turkish batsmen Osman Göker is the oldest player to appear in a T20I match during the same above mentioned match.

Rank	Age	Player	Opposition	Venue	Date
1	39y 357d	Imran Tahir	Sri Lanka	Sahara Park Newlands, Cape Town, South Africa	19 March 2019
2	36y 352d	Jacques Kallis	India	Ranasinghe Premadasa Stadium, Colombo, Sri Lanka	2 October 2012
3	36y 267d	David Miller	New Zealand	Eden Gardens, Kolkata, India	4 March 2026
4	36y 239d	Dale Steyn	Australia	New Wanderers Stadium, Johannesburg, South Africa	21 February 2020
5	36y 190d	Rassie van der Dussen	Australia	Cazalys Stadium, Cairns, Australia	16 August 2025
Last Updated: 9 April 2026

== Partnership records ==
In cricket, two batsmen are always present at the crease batting together in a partnership. This partnership will continue until one of them is dismissed, retires or the innings comes to a close.

=== Highest partnerships by wicket ===
A wicket partnership describes the number of runs scored before each wicket falls. The first wicket partnership is between the opening batsmen and continues until the first wicket falls. The second wicket partnership then commences between the not out batsman and the number three batsman. This partnership continues until the second wicket falls. The third wicket partnership then commences between the not out batsman and the new batsman. This continues down to the tenth wicket partnership. When the tenth wicket has fallen, there is no batsman left to partner so the innings is closed.

Wicket	Runs	First batsman	Second batsman	Opposition	Venue	Date
1st Wicket	170	Graeme Smith	Loots Bosman	England	Centurion Park, Centurion, South Africa	15 November 2009
2nd Wicket	168	Quinton de Kock	Rilee Rossouw	Bangladesh	Sydney Cricket Ground, Sydney, Australia	27 October 2022
3rd Wicket	157	Reeza Hendricks	Rassie van der Dussen	Pakistan	Centurion Park, Centurion, South Africa	13 December 2024
4th Wicket	174*	Quinton de Kock	David Miller	India	Dr. Bhupen Hazarika Cricket Stadium, Guwahati, India	2 October 2022
5th Wicket	86	Tristan Stubbs	David Miller	India	Wanderers Stadium, Johannesburg, South Africa	15 November 2024
6th Wicket	71	Tristan Stubbs	Patrick Kruger	West Indies	Brian Lara Cricket Academy, San Fernando, Trinidad and Tobago	23 August 2024
7th Wicket	60	Tristan Stubbs	Bjorn Fortuin	West Indies	Brian Lara Cricket Academy, San Fernando, Trinidad and Tobago	23 August 2024
8th Wicket	64*	Rusty Theron	Wayne Parnell	Australia	Wanderers Stadium, Johannesburg, South Africa	16 October 2011
9th Wicket	58*	David Miller	Lutho Sipamla	Pakistan	Gaddafi Stadium, Lahore, Pakistan	14 February 2021
10th Wicket	19*	Kagiso Rabada	Anrich Nortje	West Indies	National Cricket Stadium, Grenada	1 July 2021
Last Updated: 13 December 2024

=== Highest partnerships by runs ===
The highest T20I partnership by runs for any wicket is held by the Afghan pairing of Hazratullah Zazai and Usman Ghani who put together an opening wicket partnership of 236 runs during the Ireland v Afghanistan series in India in 2019

Wicket	Runs	First batsman	Second batsman	Opposition	Venue	Date
4th Wicket	174*	Quinton de Kock	David Miller	India	Dr. Bhupen Hazarika Cricket Stadium, Guwahati, India	2 October 2022
1st Wicket	170	Graeme Smith	Loots Bosman	England	SuperSport Park, Centurion, South Africa	15 November 2009
2nd Wicket	168	Quinton de Kock	Rilee Rossouw	Bangladesh	Sydney Cricket Ground, Sydney, Australia	27 October 2022
3rd Wicket	157	Rassie van der Dussen	Reeza Hendricks	Pakistan	SuperSport Park, Centurion, South Africa	13 December 2024
1st Wicket	152	Quinton de Kock	Reeza Hendricks	West Indies	SuperSport Park, Centurion, South Africa	26 March 2023
Last Updated: 27 March 2023

=== Highest overall partnership runs by a pair ===
Rank	Runs	Innings	Players	Highest	Average	100/50	T20I career span
1	1,349	40	Quinton de Kock & Reeza Hendricks †	152	34.58	2/8	2014–2024
2	740	22	JP Duminy & David Miller	70*	56.92	0/6	2010–2019
3	695	20	Heinrich Klaasen & David Miller †	79	43.43	0/6	2018–2024
4	672	25	Temba Bavuma & Quinton de Kock †	92	30.54	0/5	2019–2022
5	656	20	Reeza Hendricks & Aiden Markram †	112	34.52	1/4	2019–2024
An asterisk (*) signifies an unbroken partnership (i.e. neither of the batsmen was dismissed before either the end of the allotted overs or the required score being reached). Last updated: 13 December 2024

== Umpiring records ==
=== Most matches umpired ===
An umpire in cricket is a person who officiates the match according to the Laws of Cricket. Two umpires adjudicate the match on the field, whilst a third umpire has access to video replays, and a fourth umpire looks after the match balls and other duties. The records below are only for on-field umpires.

Ahsan Raza of Pakistan holds the record for the most T20I matches umpired with 49. The most experienced Australian umpire is Rod Tucker with 35 matches officiated so far.

Rank	Matches	Umpire	Period
1	38	Shaun George	2010-2019
2	38	Adrian Holdstock	2011-2021
3	33	Marais Erasmus	2006-2016
4	29	Allahudien Paleker	2018-2021
5	23	Johan Cloete	2010-2016
Last Updated: 6 November 2021

== See also ==
- List of Twenty20 International records
- List of Test cricket records
- List of Cricket World Cup records
