= International cricket in 2011–12 =

Cricket season

The 2011–12 international cricket season was from October 2011 to April 2012 and included a number of Test, One Day International and Twenty20 International series. The season saw the launch of the ICC T20I Championship in October 2011. England, the reigning ICC World Twenty20 champions, were ranked number one. England had their first defences of the ICC Test Championship number-one ranking they acquired at home in August 2011. While they retained the spot throughout the season, they showed their weaknesses in Asian conditions as they were whitewashed in a three-Test series against Pakistan. Australia were the best ranked in the ICC ODI Championship throughout the season but their rating dropped from 130 to 123 after average performances in the season. They would drop to number four in the following season.

== Season overview ==
International tours
Start date	Home team	Away team	Results [Matches]		
Start date	Home team	Away team	Test	ODI	T20I
11 October 2011	Bangladesh	West Indies	0–1 [2]	1–2 [3]	1–0 [1]
13 October 2011	South Africa	Australia	1–1 [2]	1–2 [3]	1–1 [2]
14 October 2011	India	England	—	5–0 [5]	0–1 [1]
15 October 2011	Zimbabwe	New Zealand	0–1 [1]	1–2 [3]	0–2 [2]
18 October 2011	Pakistan	Sri Lanka	1–0 [3]	4–1 [5]	1–0 [1]
6 November 2011	India	West Indies	2–0 [3]	4–1 [5]	—
29 November 2011	Bangladesh	Pakistan	0–2 [2]	0–3 [3]	0–1 [1]
1 December 2011	Australia	New Zealand	1–1 [2]	—	—
15 December 2011	South Africa	Sri Lanka	2–1 [3]	3–2 [5]	—
26 December 2011	Australia	India	4–0 [4]	—	1–1 [2]
17 January 2012	Pakistan	England	3–0 [3]	0–4 [4]	1–2 [3]
26 January 2012	New Zealand	Zimbabwe	1–0 [1]	3–0 [3]	2–0 [2]
10 February 2012	Pakistan	Afghanistan	—	1–0 [1]	—
17 February 2012	New Zealand	South Africa	0–1 [3]	0–3 [3]	1–2 [3]
16 March 2012	West Indies	Australia	0–2 [3]	2–2 [5]	1–1 [2]
26 March 2012	Sri Lanka	England	1–1 [2]	—	—
30 March 2012	South Africa	India	—	—	1–0 [1]
International tournaments
Start date	Tournament			Winners	
5 February 2012	(Australia) Commonwealth Bank Series			Australia	
11 March 2012	(Bangladesh) Asia Cup			Pakistan	
Women's international tours
Start date	Home team	Away team	Results [Matches]		
Start date	Home team	Away team	WTest	WODI	WT20I
18 February 2012	West Indies	India	—	2–1 [3]	3–2 [5]
Minor tours
Start date	Home team	Away team	Results [Matches]		
Start date	Home team	Away team	FC	List A	T20
5 October 2011	UAE	Afghanistan	0–0 [1]	2–0 [2]	—
12 February 2012	Kenya	Ireland	0–1 [1]	1–1 [2]	0–3 [3]
29 March 2012	Afghanistan	Netherlands	1–0 [1]	1–1 [2]	—
Minor tournaments
Start date	Tournament			Winners	
28 October 2011	Hong Kong Cricket Sixes			Pakistan	
18 February 2012	(Singapore) ICC World Cricket League Division Five			Singapore	
13 March 2012	(United Arab Emirates) ICC World Twenty20 Qualifier			Ireland	

== Pre-season rankings ==
ICC Test Championship 20 September 2011
Rank	Team	Matches	Points	Rating
1	England	37	4634	125
2	South Africa	21	2469	118
3	India	37	4336	117
4	Australia	31	3224	104
5	Sri Lanka	27	2786	103
6	Pakistan	24	2245	94
7	West Indies	23	2039	89
8	New Zealand	19	1485	78
9	Bangladesh	12	94	8

ICC ODI Championship 20 September 2011
Rank	Team	Matches	Points	Rating
1	Australia	30	3894	130
2	Sri Lanka	28	3327	119
3	South Africa	19	2197	116
4	England	30	3383	113
5	India	34	3804	112
6	Pakistan	29	2931	101
7	New Zealand	22	1973	90
8	West Indies	19	1475	78
9	Bangladesh	26	1648	63
10	Zimbabwe	27	1200	44
11	Ireland	12	492	41
12	Netherlands	9	137	15
13	Kenya	7	0	0

ICC T20I Championship 5 November 2011
Rank	Team	Matches	Points	Rating
1	England	11	1435	130
2	Australia	8	1009	126
3	New Zealand	9	1056	117
4	South Africa	8	900	113
5	Sri Lanka	11	1223	111
6	India	6	635	106
7	Pakistan	12	1164	97
8	West Indies	8	711	89
9	Afghanistan	3	224	75
10	Zimbabwe	7	376	54

- Note: Zimbabwe are currently unranked in Tests as they have played insufficient matches. They have 106 points and a rating of 53.

== October ==
=== West Indies in Bangladesh ===
Only T20I
No.	Date	Home captain	Away captain	Venue	Result
T20I 209	11 October	Mushfiqur Rahim	Darren Sammy	Sher-e-Bangla National Cricket Stadium, Dhaka	Bangladesh by 3 wickets
ODI series
No.	Date	Home captain	Away captain	Venue	Result
ODI 3198	13 October	Mushfiqur Rahim	Denesh Ramdin	Sher-e-Bangla National Cricket Stadium, Dhaka	West Indies by 40 runs
ODI 3200	15 October	Mushfiqur Rahim	Darren Sammy	Sher-e-Bangla National Cricket Stadium, Dhaka	West Indies by 8 wickets
ODI 3202	18 October	Mushfiqur Rahim	Darren Sammy	Zohur Ahmed Chowdhury Stadium, Chittagong	Bangladesh by 8 wickets
Test series
No.	Date	Home captain	Away captain	Venue	Result
Test 2010	21–25 October	Mushfiqur Rahim	Darren Sammy	Zohur Ahmed Chowdhury Stadium, Chittagong	Match drawn
Test 2012	29 October – 2 November	Mushfiqur Rahim	Darren Sammy	Sher-e-Bangla National Cricket Stadium, Dhaka	West Indies by 229 runs

=== Afghanistan in the UAE ===
2011–13 ICC Intercontinental Cup
No.	Date	Home captain	Away captain	Venue	Result
First-class	5–8 October	Khurram Khan	Nawroz Mangal	Sharjah Cricket Stadium, Sharjah	Match drawn
2011–13 ICC World Cricket League Championship
No.	Date	Home captain	Away captain	Venue	Result
List A	10 October	Khurram Khan	Nawroz Mangal	Sharjah Cricket Stadium, Sharjah	United Arab Emirates by 15 runs
List A	12 October	Khurram Khan	Nawroz Mangal	Sharjah Cricket Stadium, Sharjah	United Arab Emirates by 69 runs

=== Australia in South Africa ===
T20I series
No.	Date	Home captain	Away captain	Venue	Result
T20I 210	13 October	Hashim Amla	Cameron White	Newlands, Cape Town	Australia by 5 wickets
T20I 212	16 October	Hashim Amla	Cameron White	New Wanderers Stadium, Johannesburg	South Africa by 3 wickets
ODI series
No.	Date	Home captain	Away captain	Venue	Result
ODI 3203	19 October	Hashim Amla	Michael Clarke	SuperSport Park, Centurion	Australia by 93 runs (D/L)
ODI 3208	23 October	Hashim Amla	Michael Clarke	St George's Park, Port Elizabeth	South Africa by 80 runs
ODI 3211	28 October	Hashim Amla	Michael Clarke	Kingsmead, Durban	Australia by 3 wickets
Test series
No.	Date	Home captain	Away captain	Venue	Result
Test 2016	9–13 November	Graeme Smith	Michael Clarke	Newlands, Cape Town	South Africa by 8 wickets
Test 2018	17–21 November	Graeme Smith	Michael Clarke	New Wanderers Stadium, Johannesburg	Australia by 2 wickets

=== England in India ===
ODI series
No.	Date	Home captain	Away captain	Venue	Result
ODI 3199	14 October	Mahendra Singh Dhoni	Alastair Cook	Rajiv Gandhi International Cricket Stadium, Hyderabad	India by 126 runs
ODI 3201	17 October	Mahendra Singh Dhoni	Alastair Cook	Feroz Shah Kotla Ground, Delhi	India by 8 wickets
ODI 3205	20 October	Mahendra Singh Dhoni	Alastair Cook	Punjab Cricket Association IS Bindra Stadium, Mohali	India by 5 wickets
ODI 3207	23 October	Mahendra Singh Dhoni	Alastair Cook	Wankhede Stadium, Mumbai	India by 6 wickets
ODI 3210	25 October	Mahendra Singh Dhoni	Alastair Cook	Eden Gardens, Kolkata	India by 95 runs
Only T20I
No.	Date	Home captain	Away captain	Venue	Result
T20I 214	29 October	Mahendra Singh Dhoni	Graeme Swann	Eden Gardens, Kolkata	England by 6 wickets

=== New Zealand in Zimbabwe ===
T20I series
No.	Date	Home captain	Away captain	Venue	Result
T20I 211	15 October	Brendan Taylor	Ross Taylor	Harare Sports Club, Harare	New Zealand by 10 wickets
T20I 213	17 October	Brendan Taylor	Ross Taylor	Harare Sports Club, Harare	New Zealand by 34 runs (D/L)
ODI series
No.	Date	Home captain	Away captain	Venue	Result
ODI 3204	20 October	Brendan Taylor	Ross Taylor	Harare Sports Club, Harare	New Zealand by 9 wickets
ODI 3206	22 October	Brendan Taylor	Ross Taylor	Harare Sports Club, Harare	New Zealand by 4 wickets
ODI 3209	25 October	Brendan Taylor	Ross Taylor	Queens Sports Club, Bulawayo	Zimbabwe by 1 wicket
Test series
No.	Date	Home captain	Away captain	Venue	Result
Test 2013	1–5 November	Brendan Taylor	Ross Taylor	Queens Sports Club, Bulawayo	New Zealand by 34 runs

=== Sri Lanka vs Pakistan in United Arab Emirates ===
Test series
No.	Date	Home captain	Away captain	Venue	Result
Test 2009	18–22 October	Misbah-ul-Haq	Tillakaratne Dilshan	Sheikh Zayed Stadium, Abu Dhabi	Match drawn
Test 2011	26–30 October	Misbah-ul-Haq	Tillakaratne Dilshan	Dubai International Cricket Stadium, Dubai	Pakistan by 9 wickets
Test 2014	3–7 November	Misbah-ul-Haq	Tillakaratne Dilshan	Sharjah Cricket Stadium, Sharjah	Match drawn
ODI series
No.	Date	Home captain	Away captain	Venue	Result
ODI 3212	11 November	Misbah-ul-Haq	Tillakaratne Dilshan	Dubai International Cricket Stadium, Dubai	Pakistan by 8 wickets
ODI 3213	14 November	Misbah-ul-Haq	Tillakaratne Dilshan	Dubai International Cricket Stadium, Dubai	Sri Lanka by 25 runs
ODI 3214	18 November	Misbah-ul-Haq	Tillakaratne Dilshan	Dubai International Cricket Stadium, Dubai	Pakistan by 21 runs
ODI 3215	20 November	Misbah-ul-Haq	Tillakaratne Dilshan	Sharjah Cricket Stadium, Sharjah	Pakistan by 26 runs
ODI 3216	23 November	Misbah-ul-Haq	Tillakaratne Dilshan	Sheikh Zayed Stadium, Abu Dhabi	Pakistan by 3 wickets
Only T20I
No.	Date	Home captain	Away captain	Venue	Result
T20I 215	25 November	Misbah-ul-Haq	Tillakaratne Dilshan	Sheikh Zayed Stadium, Abu Dhabi	Pakistan by 5 wickets

== November ==
=== West Indies in India ===
Test series
No.	Date	Home captain	Away captain	Venue	Result
Test 2015	6–10 November	Mahendra Singh Dhoni	Darren Sammy	Feroz Shah Kotla Ground, Delhi	India by 5 wickets
Test 2017	14–18 November	Mahendra Singh Dhoni	Darren Sammy	Eden Gardens, Kolkata	India by an innings and 15 runs
Test 2019	22–26 November	Mahendra Singh Dhoni	Darren Sammy	Wankhede Stadium, Mumbai	Match drawn
ODI series
No.	Date	Home captain	Away captain	Venue	Result
ODI 3217	29 November	Virender Sehwag	Darren Sammy	Barabati Stadium, Cuttack	India by 1 wicket
ODI 3219	2 December	Virender Sehwag	Darren Sammy	Dr. Y. S. Rajasekhara Reddy International Cricket Stadium, Visakhapatnam	India by 5 wickets
ODI 3221	5 December	Virender Sehwag	Darren Sammy	Sardar Patel Stadium, Ahmedabad	West Indies by 16 runs
ODI 3223	8 December	Virender Sehwag	Darren Sammy	Holkar Stadium, Indore	India by 153 runs
ODI 3224	11 December	Gautam Gambhir	Darren Sammy	M. A. Chidambaram Stadium, Chennai	India by 34 runs

=== Pakistan in Bangladesh ===
Only T20I
No.	Date	Home captain	Away captain	Venue	Result
T20I 216	29 November	Mushfiqur Rahim	Misbah-ul-Haq	Sher-e-Bangla National Stadium, Mirpur	Pakistan by 50 runs
ODI series
No.	Date	Home captain	Away captain	Venue	Result
ODI 3218	1 December	Mushfiqur Rahim	Misbah-ul-Haq	Sher-e-Bangla National Stadium, Mirpur	Pakistan by 5 wickets
ODI 3220	3 December	Mushfiqur Rahim	Misbah-ul-Haq	Sher-e-Bangla National Stadium, Mirpur	Pakistan by 76 runs
ODI 3222	6 December	Mushfiqur Rahim	Misbah-ul-Haq	Zahur Ahmed Chowdhury Stadium, Chittagong	Pakistan by 58 runs
Test series
No.	Date	Home captain	Away captain	Venue	Result
Test 2022	9–13 December	Mushfiqur Rahim	Misbah-ul-Haq	Zahur Ahmed Chowdhury Stadium, Chittagong	Pakistan by an innings and 184 runs
Test 2024	17–21 December	Mushfiqur Rahim	Misbah-ul-Haq	Sher-e-Bangla National Stadium, Mirpur	Pakistan by 7 wickets

== December ==
=== New Zealand in Australia ===
Test series
No.	Date	Home captain	Away captain	Venue	Result
Test 2020	1–5 December	Michael Clarke	Ross Taylor	The Gabba, Brisbane	Australia by 9 wickets
Test 2021	9–13 December	Michael Clarke	Ross Taylor	Bellerive Oval, Hobart	New Zealand by 7 runs

=== Sri Lanka in South Africa ===
Test series
No.	Date	Home captain	Away captain	Venue	Result
Test 2023	15–19 December	Graeme Smith	Tillakaratne Dilshan	SuperSport Park, Centurion	South Africa by an innings and 81 runs
Test 2026	26–30 December	Graeme Smith	Tillakaratne Dilshan	Kingsmead, Durban	Sri Lanka by 208 runs
Test 2028	3–7 January	Graeme Smith	Tillakaratne Dilshan	Newlands, Cape Town	South Africa by 10 wickets
ODI series
No.	Date	Home captain	Away captain	Venue	Result
ODI 3225	11 January	AB de Villiers	Tillakaratne Dilshan	Boland Park, Paarl	South Africa by 258 runs
ODI 3226	14 January	AB de Villiers	Tillakaratne Dilshan	Buffalo Park, East London	South Africa by 5 wickets
ODI 3227	17 January	AB de Villiers	Tillakaratne Dilshan	Chevrolet Park, Bloemfontein	South Africa by 4 runs (D/L)
ODI 3228	20 January	AB de Villiers	Tillakaratne Dilshan	De Beers Diamond Oval, Kimberley	Sri Lanka by 5 wickets
ODI 3229	22 January	AB de Villiers	Tillakaratne Dilshan	New Wanderers Stadium, Johannesburg	Sri Lanka by 2 wickets

=== India in Australia ===
Test series
No.	Date	Home captain	Away captain	Venue	Result
Test 2025	26–30 December	Michael Clarke	Mahendra Singh Dhoni	Melbourne Cricket Ground, Melbourne	Australia by 122 runs
Test 2027	3–7 January	Michael Clarke	Mahendra Singh Dhoni	Sydney Cricket Ground, Sydney	Australia by an innings and 68 runs
Test 2029	13–17 January	Michael Clarke	Mahendra Singh Dhoni	WACA Ground, Perth	Australia by an innings and 37 runs
Test 2031	24–28 January	Michael Clarke	Virender Sehwag	Adelaide Oval, Adelaide	Australia by 298 runs
T20I series
No.	Date	Home captain	Away captain	Venue	Result
T20I 217	1 February	George Bailey	Mahendra Singh Dhoni	Stadium Australia, Sydney	Australia by 31 runs
T20I 218	3 February	George Bailey	Mahendra Singh Dhoni	Melbourne Cricket Ground, Melbourne	India by 8 wickets

== January ==
=== England vs Pakistan in United Arab Emirates ===
Test series
No.	Date	Home captain	Away captain	Venue	Result
Test 2030	17–21 January	Misbah-ul-Haq	Andrew Strauss	Dubai International Cricket Stadium, Dubai	Pakistan by 10 wickets
Test 2032	25–29 January	Misbah-ul-Haq	Andrew Strauss	Sheikh Zayed Stadium, Abu Dhabi	Pakistan by 72 runs
Test 2034	3–7 February	Misbah-ul-Haq	Andrew Strauss	Dubai International Cricket Stadium, Dubai	Pakistan by 71 runs
ODI series
No.	Date	Home captain	Away captain	Venue	Result
ODI 3238	13 February	Misbah-ul-Haq	Alastair Cook	Sheikh Zayed Stadium, Abu Dhabi	England by 130 runs
ODI 3240	15 February	Misbah-ul-Haq	Alastair Cook	Sheikh Zayed Stadium, Abu Dhabi	England by 20 runs
ODI 3243	18 February	Misbah-ul-Haq	Alastair Cook	Dubai International Cricket Stadium, Dubai	England by 9 wickets
ODI 3247	21 February	Misbah-ul-Haq	Alastair Cook	Dubai International Cricket Stadium, Dubai	England by 4 wickets
T20I series
No.	Date	Home captain	Away captain	Venue	Result
T20I 226	23 February	Misbah-ul-Haq	Stuart Broad	Dubai International Cricket Stadium, Dubai	Pakistan by 8 runs
T20I 228	25 February	Misbah-ul-Haq	Stuart Broad	Dubai International Cricket Stadium, Dubai	England by 38 runs
T20I 229	27 February	Misbah-ul-Haq	Stuart Broad	Sheikh Zayed Stadium, Abu Dhabi	England by 5 runs

=== Zimbabwe in New Zealand ===
Test series
No.	Date	Home captain	Away captain	Venue	Result
Test 2033	26–30 January	Ross Taylor	Brendan Taylor	McLean Park, Napier	New Zealand by an innings and 301 runs
ODI series
No.	Date	Home captain	Away captain	Venue	Result
ODI 3230	3 February	Brendon McCullum	Brendan Taylor	University Oval, Dunedin	New Zealand by 90 runs
ODI 3232	6 February	Brendon McCullum	Brendan Taylor	Cobham Oval, Whangārei	New Zealand by 141 runs
ODI 3234	9 February	Brendon McCullum	Brendan Taylor	McLean Park, Napier	New Zealand by 202 runs
T20I series
No.	Date	Home captain	Away captain	Venue	Result
T20I 219	12 February	Brendon McCullum	Brendan Taylor	Eden Park, Auckland	New Zealand by 7 wickets
T20I 220	14 February	Brendon McCullum	Brendan Taylor	Seddon Park, Hamilton	New Zealand by 5 wickets

== February ==
=== Commonwealth Bank Series ===
Group Stage
Pos	Team	Pld	W	L	T	NR	BP	Pts	NRR	For	Against
1	Sri Lanka	8	4	3	1	0	1	19	0.164	1977/373.3	1920/374.2
2	Australia	8	4	4	0	0	3	19	−4.639	16/373	1663/355.1
3	India	8	3	4	1	0	1	15	−0.593	1793/365	2103/382

Source: Commonwealth Bank Series 2011/12 Table

ODI series
No.	Date	Team 1	Captain 1	Team 2	Captain 2	Venue	Result
ODI 3231	5 February	Australia	Michael Clarke	India	Mahendra Singh Dhoni	Melbourne Cricket Ground, Melbourne	Australia by 65 runs (D/L)
ODI 3233	8 February	India	Mahendra Singh Dhoni	Sri Lanka	Mahela Jayawardene	WACA Ground, Perth	India by 4 wickets
ODI 3235	10 February	Australia	Michael Clarke	Sri Lanka	Mahela Jayawardene	WACA Ground, Perth	Australia by 5 runs
ODI 3237	12 February	Australia	Michael Clarke	India	Mahendra Singh Dhoni	Adelaide Oval, Adelaide	India by 4 wickets
ODI 3239	14 February	India	Mahendra Singh Dhoni	Sri Lanka	Mahela Jayawardene	Adelaide Oval, Adelaide	Match tied
ODI 3241	17 February	Australia	Ricky Ponting	Sri Lanka	Mahela Jayawardene	Sydney Cricket Ground, Sydney	Sri Lanka by 8 wickets (D/L)
ODI 3244	19 February	Australia	Ricky Ponting	India	Mahendra Singh Dhoni	The Gabba, Brisbane	Australia by 110 runs
ODI 3246	21 February	India	Virender Sehwag	Sri Lanka	Mahela Jayawardene	The Gabba, Brisbane	Sri Lanka by 51 runs
ODI 3248	24 February	Australia	Michael Clarke	Sri Lanka	Mahela Jayawardene	Bellerive Oval, Hobart	Sri Lanka by 3 wickets
ODI 3250	26 February	Australia	Shane Watson	India	Mahendra Singh Dhoni	Sydney Cricket Ground, Sydney	Australia by 87 runs
ODI 3251	28 February	India	Mahendra Singh Dhoni	Sri Lanka	Mahela Jayawardene	Bellerive Oval, Hobart	India by 7 wickets
ODI 3253	2 March	Australia	Shane Watson	Sri Lanka	Mahela Jayawardene	Melbourne Cricket Ground, Melbourne	Sri Lanka by 9 runs
Finals
No.	Date	Team 1	Captain 1	Team 2	Captain 2	Venue	Result
ODI 3255	4 March	Australia	Michael Clarke	Sri Lanka	Mahela Jayawardene	The Gabba, Brisbane	Australia by 15 runs
ODI 3256	6 March	Australia	Michael Clarke	Sri Lanka	Mahela Jayawardene	Adelaide Oval, Adelaide	Sri Lanka by 8 wickets
ODI 3257	8 March	Australia	Shane Watson	Sri Lanka	Mahela Jayawardene	Adelaide Oval, Adelaide	Australia by 16 runs

=== Afghanistan against Pakistan in UAE ===
Only ODI
No.	Date	Home captain	Away captain	Venue	Result
ODI 3236	10 February	Misbah-ul-Haq	Nawroz Mangal	Sharjah Cricket Stadium, Sharjah	Pakistan by 7 wickets

=== Ireland in Kenya ===
2011–13 ICC Intercontinental Cup
No.	Date	Home captain	Away captain	Venue	Result
First-class	12–15 February	Collins Obuya	William Porterfield	Mombasa Sports Club, Mombasa	Ireland by 10 runs
2011–13 ICC World Cricket League Championship
No.	Date	Home captain	Away captain	Venue	Result
ODI 3242	18 February	Collins Obuya	William Porterfield	Mombasa Sports Club, Mombasa	Kenya by 7 wickets
ODI 3245	20 February	Collins Obuya	William Porterfield	Mombasa Sports Club, Mombasa	Ireland by 117 runs
T20I series
No.	Date	Home captain	Away captain	Venue	Result
T20I 224	22 February	Collins Obuya	William Porterfield	Mombasa Sports Club, Mombasa	Ireland by 6 wickets
T20I 225	23 February	Collins Obuya	William Porterfield	Mombasa Sports Club, Mombasa	Ireland by 8 wickets
T20I 227	24 February	Collins Obuya	William Porterfield	Mombasa Sports Club, Mombasa	Ireland by 2 runs

=== South Africa in New Zealand ===
T20I series
No.	Date	Home captain	Away captain	Venue	Result
T20I 221	17 February	Brendon McCullum	AB de Villiers	Westpac Stadium, Wellington	New Zealand by 6 wickets
T20I 222	19 February	Brendon McCullum	AB de Villiers	Seddon Park, Hamilton	South Africa by 8 wickets
T20I 223	22 February	Brendon McCullum	AB de Villiers	Eden Park, Auckland	South Africa by 3 runs
ODI series
No.	Date	Home captain	Away captain	Venue	Result
ODI 3249	25 February	Brendon McCullum	AB de Villiers	Westpac Stadium, Wellington	South Africa by 6 wickets
ODI 3252	29 February	Brendon McCullum	AB de Villiers	McLean Park, Napier	South Africa by 6 wickets
ODI 3254	3 March	Brendon McCullum	AB de Villiers	Eden Park, Auckland	South Africa by 5 wickets
Test series
No.	Date	Home captain	Away captain	Venue	Result
Test 2035	7–11 March	Ross Taylor	Graeme Smith	University Oval, Dunedin	Match drawn
Test 2036	15–19 March	Ross Taylor	Graeme Smith	Seddon Park, Hamilton	South Africa by 9 wickets
Test 2037	23–27 March	Ross Taylor	Graeme Smith	Basin Reserve, Wellington	Match drawn

=== India women in West Indies ===
WT20I series
No.	Date	Home captain	Away captain	Venue	Result
WT20I 131	18 February	Merissa Aguilleira	Anjum Chopra	Sir Vivian Richards Stadium, Antigua	West Indies by 8 wickets
WT20I 133	19 February	Merissa Aguilleira	Anjum Chopra	Sir Vivian Richards Stadium, Antigua	India by 3 runs
WT20I 135	22 February	Merissa Aguilleira	Anjum Chopra	Windsor Park, Dominica	West Indies by 2 wickets
WT20I 136	23 February	Merissa Aguilleira	Anjum Chopra	Windsor Park, Dominica	West Indies by 6 wickets
WT20I 138	27 February	Stafanie Taylor	Anjum Chopra	Warner Park, Basseterre	India by 6 wickets
WODI series
No.	Date	Home captain	Away captain	Venue	Result
WODI 810	29 February	Merissa Aguilleira	Anjum Chopra	Warner Park, Basseterre	India by 76 runs
WODI 812	2 March	Merissa Aguilleira	Anjum Chopra	Warner Park, Basseterre	West Indies by 42 runs
WODI 814	4 March	Merissa Aguilleira	Anjum Chopra	Warner Park, Basseterre	West Indies by 3 wickets

=== World Cricket League Division Five ===
==== Group stage ====
Pos	Team	Pld	W	L	T	NR	Pts	NRR
1	Singapore	5	4	1	0	0	8	1.715
2	Malaysia	5	4	1	0	0	8	0.600
3	Guernsey	5	3	2	0	0	6	0.524
4	Cayman Islands	5	2	3	0	0	4	−0.422
5	Bahrain	5	2	3	0	0	4	−0.696
6	Argentina	5	0	5	0	0	0	−2.030

Group stage
No.	Date	Team 1	Captain 1	Team 2	Captain 2	Venue	Result
Match 1	18 February	Malaysia	Ahmed Faiz	Argentina	Esteban MacDermott	Indian Association Ground, Singapore	Malaysia by 47 runs (D/L)
Match 2	18 February	Bahrain	Yaser Sadeq	Guernsey	Stuart Le Prevost	The Padang, Singapore	Guernsey by 9 wickets
Match 3	18 February	Singapore	Saad Janjua	Cayman Islands	Abali Hoilett	Kallang Ground, Singapore	Singapore by 80 runs (D/L)
Match 4	19 February	Bahrain	Yaser Sadeq	Argentina	Esteban MacDermott	Kallang Ground, Singapore	Bahrain by 65 runs
Match 5	19 February	Cayman Islands	Abali Hoilett	Malaysia	Ahmed Faiz	The Padang, Singapore	Malaysia by 9 wickets
Match 6	19 February	Singapore	Saad Janjua	Guernsey	Stuart Le Prevost	Indian Association Ground, Singapore	Singapore by 78 runs
Match 7	21 February	Argentina	Esteban MacDermott	Guernsey	Stuart Le Prevost	The Padang, Singapore	Guernsey by 29 runs (D/L)
Match 8	21 February	Bahrain	Yaser Sadeq	Cayman Islands	Abali Hoilett	Indian Association Ground, Singapore	Cayman Islands by 8 wickets (D/L)
Match 9	21 February	Singapore	Saad Janjua	Malaysia	Suresh Navaratnam	Kallang Ground, Singapore	Malaysia by 27 runs (D/L)
Match 10	22 February	Cayman Islands	Abali Hoilett	Argentina	Esteban MacDermott	Indian Association Ground, Singapore	Cayman Islands by 10 wickets
Match 11	22 February	Guernsey	Stuart Le Prevost	Malaysia	Suresh Navaratnam	Kallang Ground, Singapore	Malaysia by 4 runs
Match 12	22 February	Singapore	Saad Janjua	Bahrain	Yaser Sadeq	The Padang, Singapore	Singapore by 102 runs
Match 13	24 February	Bahrain	Yaser Sadeq	Malaysia	Suresh Navaratnam	Indian Association Ground, Singapore	Bahrain by 2 wickets
Match 14	24 February	Cayman Islands	Abali Hoilett	Guernsey	Stuart Le Prevost	Kallang Ground, Singapore	Guernsey by 6 wickets
Match 15	24 February	Singapore	Saad Janjua	Argentina	Esteban MacDermott	The Padang, Singapore	Singapore by 146 runs
Playoffs
5th place playoff	25 February	Argentina	Esteban MacDermott	Bahrain	Yaser Sadeq	Indian Association Ground, Singapore	Bahrain by 5 wickets
3rd place playoff	25 February	Cayman Islands	Abali Hoilett	Guernsey	Stuart Le Prevost	The Padang, Singapore	Guernsey by 1 run
Final	25 February	Malaysia	Suresh Navaratnam	Singapore	Saad Janjua	Kallang Ground, Singapore	Singapore by 9 wickets

===== Final Placings =====
Pos	Team	Status
1st	Singapore	Promoted to Division Four for 2012
2nd	Malaysia	Promoted to Division Four for 2012
3rd	Guernsey	Remained in Division Five for 2014
4th	Cayman Islands	Remained in Division Five for 2014
5th	Bahrain	Relegated to Division Six for 2013
6th	Argentina	Relegated to Division Six for 2013

== March ==
=== Asia Cup ===
Pos	Team	Pld	W	L	T	NR	BP	Pts	NRR	For	Against
1	Pakistan	3	2	1	0	0	1	9	0.444	780/139.5	759/147.5
2	Bangladesh	3	2	1	0	0	0	8	0.022	746/136.3	762/140
3	India	3	2	1	0	0	0	8	0.377	923/147.5	876/149.2
4	Sri Lanka	3	0	3	0	0	0	0	−0.887	653/140	705/127

Group stage
No.	Date	Team 1	Captain 1	Team 2	Captain 2	Venue	Result
ODI 3258	11 March	Bangladesh	Mushfiqur Rahim	Pakistan	Misbah-ul-Haq	Sher-e-Bangla National Stadium, Mirpur	Pakistan by 21 runs
ODI 3259	13 March	India	Mahendra Singh Dhoni	Sri Lanka	Mahela Jayawardene	Sher-e-Bangla National Stadium, Mirpur	India by 50 runs
ODI 3260	15 March	Pakistan	Misbah-ul-Haq	Sri Lanka	Mahela Jayawardene	Sher-e-Bangla National Stadium, Mipur	Pakistan by 6 wickets
ODI 3261	16 March	Bangladesh	Mushfiqur Rahim	India	Mahendra Singh Dhoni	Sher-e-Bangla National Stadium, Mirpur	Bangladesh by 5 wickets
ODI 3263	18 March	India	Mahendra Singh Dhoni	Pakistan	Misbah-ul-Haq	Sher-e-Bangla National Stadium, Mirpur	India by 6 wickets
ODI 3265	20 March	Bangladesh	Mushfiqur Rahim	Sri Lanka	Mahela Jayawardene	Sher-e-Bangla National Stadium, Mirpur	Bangladesh by 5 wickets (D/L)
Final
No.	Date	Team 1	Captain 1	Team 2	Captain 2	Venue	Result
ODI 3267	22 March	Pakistan	Misbah-ul-Haq	Bangladesh	Mushfiqur Rahim	Sher-e-Bangla National Stadium, Mirpur	Pakistan by 2 runs

=== ICC World Twenty20 Qualifier ===
Group A
Pos	Team	Pld	W	L	T	NR	Pts	NRR
1	Afghanistan	7	7	0	0	0	14	1.886
2	Netherlands	7	6	1	0	0	12	1.671
3	Canada	7	5	2	0	0	10	0.805
4	Papua New Guinea	7	3	4	0	0	6	0.045
5	Nepal	7	3	4	0	0	6	−0.197
6	Hong Kong	7	2	5	0	0	4	−1.256
7	Bermuda	7	1	6	0	0	2	−0.990
8	Denmark	7	1	6	0	0	2	−2.008

Group B
Pos	Team	Pld	W	L	T	NR	Pts	NRR
1	Namibia	7	7	0	0	0	14	1.186
2	Ireland	7	6	1	0	0	12	2.210
3	Scotland	7	4	3	0	0	8	0.347
4	Kenya	7	4	3	0	0	8	0.340
5	Italy	7	3	4	0	0	6	−0.006
6	United States	7	2	5	0	0	4	−1.002
7	Uganda	7	2	5	0	0	4	−1.190
8	Oman	7	0	7	0	0	0	−1.801

Group stage
No.	Date	Group	Team 1	Captain 1	Team 2	Captain 2	Venue	Result
Match 1	13 March	A	Papua New Guinea	Rarua Dikana	Afghanistan	Nawroz Mangal	Dubai International Cricket Stadium, Dubai	Afghanistan by 6 wickets
Match 2	13 March	B	Oman	Hemal Mehta	Italy	Alessandro Bonora	ICC Global Cricket Academy, Dubai	Italy by 9 wickets
Match 3	13 March	B	Namibia	Sarel Burger	Ireland	William Porterfield	ICC Global Cricket Academy Ground No 2, Dubai	Namibia by 4 runs
Match 4	13 March	B	United States	Sushil Nadkarni	Uganda	Davis Arinaitwe	Sharjah Cricket Stadium, Sharjah	Uganda by 4 wickets
T20I 230	13 March	A	Netherlands	Peter Borren	Canada	Rizwan Cheema	Dubai International Cricket Stadium, Dubai	Netherlands by 42 runs
T20I 231	13 March	B	Scotland	Gordon Drummond	Kenya	Collins Obuya	ICC Global Cricket Academy, Dubai	Scotland by 14 runs
Match 7	13 March	A	Nepal	Paras Khadka	Hong Kong	Jamie Atkinson	ICC Global Cricket Academy Ground No 2, Dubai	Nepal by 28 runs
Match 8	13 March	A	Bermuda	David Hemp	Denmark	Michael Pedersen	Sharjah Cricket Stadium, Sharjah	Denmark by 7 wickets
T20I 232	14 March	B	Kenya	Collins Obuya	Ireland	William Porterfield	Dubai International Cricket Stadium, Dubai	Ireland by 10 wickets
Match 10	14 March	A	Canada	Rizwan Cheema	Papua New Guinea	Rarua Dikana	ICC Global Cricket Academy, Dubai	Canada by 6 runs
Match 11	14 March	A	Bermuda	David Hemp	Hong Kong	Jamie Atkinson	ICC Global Cricket Academy Ground No 2, Dubai	Hong Kong by 8 wickets
Match 12	14 March	B	Italy	Alessandro Bonora	United States	Sushil Nadkarni	Sheikh Zayed Stadium, Abu Dhabi	Italy by 8 runs
T20I 233	14 March	A	Netherlands	Peter Borren	Afghanistan	Nawroz Mangal	Dubai International Cricket Stadium, Dubai	Afghanistan by 4 wickets
Match 14	14 March	A	Denmark	Michael Pedersen	Nepal	Paras Khadka	ICC Global Cricket Academy, Dubai	Nepal by 9 wickets
Match 15	14 March	B	Oman	Hemal Mehta	Uganda	Davis Arinaitwe	ICC Global Cricket Academy Ground No 2, Dubai	Uganda by 3 wickets
Match 16	14 March	B	Namibia	Sarel Burger	Scotland	Gordon Drummond	Sheikh Zayed Stadium, Abu Dhabi	Namibia by 49 runs
Match 17	15 March	A	Hong Kong	Jamie Atkinson	Canada	Rizwan Cheema	ICC Global Cricket Academy, Dubai	Canada by 8 wickets
Match 18	15 March	B	Namibia	Sarel Burger	United States	Sushil Nadkarni	ICC Global Cricket Academy Ground No 2, Dubai	Namibia by 17 runs
Match 19	15 March	B	Italy	Alessandro Bonora	Ireland	William Porterfield	Sheikh Zayed Stadium, Abu Dhabi	Ireland by 2 wickets
Match 20	15 March	A	Afghanistan	Nawroz Mangal	Denmark	Michael Pedersen	Sharjah Cricket Stadium, Sharjah	Afghanistan by 89 runs
Match 21	15 March	B	Scotland	Kyle Coetzer	Uganda	Davis Arinaitwe	ICC Global Cricket Academy, Dubai	Scotland by 34 runs
Match 22	15 March	B	Kenya	Collins Obuya	Oman	Hemal Mehta	ICC Global Cricket Academy Ground No 2, Dubai	Kenya by 35 runs
Match 23	15 March	A	Netherlands	Peter Borren	Bermuda	David Hemp	Sheikh Zayed Stadium, Abu Dhabi	Netherlands by 4 runs
Match 24	15 March	A	Papua New Guinea	Rarua Dikana	Nepal	Paras Khadka	Sharjah Cricket Stadium, Sharjah	Papua New Guinea by 35 runs
Match 25	16 March	A	Canada	Rizwan Cheema	Bermuda	David Hemp	Dubai International Cricket Stadium, Dubai	Canada by 72 runs
Match 26	16 March	A	Denmark	Michael Pedersen	Netherlands	Peter Borren	ICC Global Cricket Academy Ground No 2, Dubai	Netherlands by 7 wickets
Match 27	16 March	B	Namibia	Sarel Burger	Uganda	Davis Arinaitwe	Sheikh Zayed Stadium, Abu Dhabi	Namibia by 4 runs
Match 28	16 March	B	Scotland	Kyle Coetzer	Oman	Hemal Mehta	Sharjah Cricket Stadium, Sharjah	Scotland by 52 runs
Match 29	16 March	A	Hong Kong	Jamie Atkinson	Papua New Guinea	Rarua Dikana	Dubai International Cricket Stadium, Dubai	Papua New Guinea by 4 wickets
Match 30	16 March	B	Ireland	William Porterfield	United States	Sushil Nadkarni	ICC Global Cricket Academy Ground No 2, Dubai	Ireland by 64 runs
Match 31	16 March	B	Italy	Alessandro Bonora	Kenya	Collins Obuya	Sheikh Zayed Stadium, Abu Dhabi	Kenya by 7 wickets
Match 32	16 March	A	Afghanistan	Nawroz Mangal	Nepal	Paras Khadka	Sharjah Cricket Stadium, Sharjah	Afghanistan by 34 runs
Match 33	18 March	B	United States	Sushil Nadkarni	Oman	Hemal Mehta	Dubai International Cricket Stadium, Dubai	United States by 30 runs
Match 34	18 March	A	Hong Kong	Jamie Atkinson	Denmark	Michael Pedersen	ICC Global Cricket Academy, Dubai	Hong Kong by 35 runs
Match 35	18 March	A	Papua New Guinea	Rarua Dikana	Netherlands	Peter Borren	Sheikh Zayed Stadium, Abu Dhabi	Netherlands by 9 wickets
Match 36	18 March	B	Italy	Alessandro Bonora	Uganda	Davis Arinaitwe	Sharjah Cricket Stadium, Sharjah	Italy by 13 runs
T20I 234	18 March	A	Afghanistan	Nawroz Mangal	Canada	Rizwan Cheema	ICC Global Cricket Academy, Dubai	Afghanistan by 41 runs
T20I 235	18 March	B	Ireland	William Porterfield	Scotland	Kyle Coetzer	Dubai International Cricket Stadium, Dubai	Ireland by 17 runs
Match 39	18 March	A	Nepal	Paras Khadka	Bermuda	David Hemp	Sheikh Zayed Stadium, Abu Dhabi	Nepal by 24 runs
Match 40	18 March	B	Kenya	Collins Obuya	Namibia	Sarel Burger	Sharjah Cricket Stadium, Sharjah	Namibia by 7 wickets
Match 41	19 March	A	Nepal	Paras Khadka	Netherlands	Peter Borren	ICC Global Cricket Academy, Dubai	Netherlands by 6 wickets
Match 42	19 March	B	Italy	Alessandro Bonora	Scotland	Gordon Drummond	ICC Global Cricket Academy Ground No 2, Dubai	Scotland by 7 wickets
Match 43	19 March	B	United States	Sushil Nadkarni	Kenya	Collins Obuya	Sheikh Zayed Stadium, Abu Dhabi	Kenya by 9 wickets
Match 44	19 March	A	Hong Kong	Nizakat Khan	Afghanistan	Nawroz Mangal	Sharjah Cricket Stadium, Sharjah	Afghanistan by 9 wickets
Match 45	19 March	A	Papua New Guinea	Rarua Dikana	Bermuda	David Hemp	ICC Global Cricket Academy, Dubai	Bermuda by 5 wickets
Match 46	19 March	B	Ireland	William Porterfield	Uganda	Davis Arinaitwe	ICC Global Cricket Academy Ground No 2, Dubai	Ireland by 82 runs
Match 47	19 March	A	Canada	Rizwan Cheema	Denmark	Michael Pedersen	Sheikh Zayed Stadium, Abu Dhabi	Canada by 55 runs
Match 48	19 March	B	Namibia	Sarel Burger	Oman	Qais Al Said	Sharjah Cricket Stadium, Sharjah	Namibia by 36 runs
Match 49	20 March	A	Afghanistan	Mohammad Nabi	Bermuda	David Hemp	ICC Global Cricket Academy, Dubai	Afghanistan by 15 runs
Match 50	20 March	B	Kenya	Collins Obuya	Uganda	Davis Arinaitwe	ICC Global Cricket Academy Ground No 2, Dubai	Kenya by 48 runs
Match 51	20 March	B	Ireland	William Porterfield	Oman	Sultan Ahmed	Sheikh Zayed Stadium, Abu Dhabi	Ireland by 44 runs
Match 52	20 March	A	Netherlands	Peter Borren	Hong Kong	Jamie Atkinson	Sharjah Cricket Stadium, Sharjah	Netherlands by 83 runs
Match 53	20 March	B	Namibia	Sarel Burger	Italy	Alessandro Bonora	ICC Global Cricket Academy, Dubai	Namibia by 27 runs
Match 54	20 March	B	Scotland	Kyle Coetzer	United States	Aditya Mishra	ICC Global Cricket Academy Ground No 2, Dubai	United States by 7 wickets
Match 55	20 March	A	Papua New Guinea	Rarua Dikana	Denmark	Michael Pedersen	Sheikh Zayed Stadium, Abu Dhabi	Papua New Guinea by 14 runs
Match 56	20 March	A	Canada	Rizwan Cheema	Nepal	Paras Khadka	Sharjah Cricket Stadium, Sharjah	Canada by 18 runs
15th place playoff
15th place playoff	22 March		Oman	Hemal Mehta	Denmark	Michael Pedersen	ICC Global Cricket Academy Ground No 2, Dubai	Oman by 17 runs
11th place playoff
No.	Date		Team 1	Captain 1	Team 2	Captain 2	Venue	Result
Semi-final 1	22 March		Uganda	Davis Arinaitwe	Hong Kong	Jamie Atkinson	Sharjah Cricket Stadium, Sharjah	Hong Kong by 5 wickets
Semi-final 2	22 March		United States	Aditya Mishra	Bermuda	David Hemp	Sharjah Cricket Stadium, Sharjah	United States by 34 runs
13th place	23 March		Bermuda	Steven Outerbridge	Uganda	Davis Arinaitwe	ICC Global Cricket Academy Ground No 2, Dubai	Bermuda by 41 runs
11th place	23 March		Hong Kong	Jamie Atkinson	United States	Sushil Nadkarni	ICC Global Cricket Academy Ground No 2, Dubai	Hong Kong by 77 runs
7th place playoff
Semi-final 1	22 March		Kenya	Collins Obuya	Nepal	Paras Khadka	ICC Global Cricket Academy, Dubai	Nepal by 5 wickets
Semi-final 2	22 March		Papua New Guinea	Rarua Dikana	Italy	Alessandro Bonora	ICC Global Cricket Academy Ground No 2, Dubai	Papua New Guinea by 12 runs
9th place	23 March		Kenya	Collins Obuya	Italy	Alessandro Bonora	ICC Global Cricket Academy, Dubai	Kenya by 38 runs
7th place	23 March		Papua New Guinea	Rarua Dikana	Nepal	Paras Khadka	ICC Global Cricket Academy, Dubai	Nepal by 6 wickets
1st place playoff
Elimination play-offs
T20I 236	22 March		Canada	Rizwan Cheema	Ireland	William Porterfield	Dubai International Cricket Stadium, Dubai	Ireland by 10 wickets
T20I 237	22 March		Scotland	Kyle Coetzer	Netherlands	Peter Borren	ICC Global Cricket Academy, Dubai	Netherlands by 3 wickets
5th place playoff
T20I 239	23 March		Canada	Rizwan Cheema	Scotland	Gordon Drummond	Dubai International Cricket Stadium, Dubai	Scotland by 4 wickets
Qualifier 1
Qualifier 1	22 March		Afghanistan	Nawroz Mangal	Namibia	Sarel Burger	Dubai International Cricket Stadium, Dubai	Afghanistan by 47 runs
Elimination semi-final
T20I 238	23 March		Netherlands	Peter Borren	Ireland	William Porterfield	Dubai International Cricket Stadium, Dubai	Ireland by 7 wickets
Qualifier 2
Qualifier 2	24 March		Namibia	Sarel Burger	Ireland	William Porterfield	Dubai International Cricket Stadium, Dubai	Ireland by 9 wickets
Final
T20I 240	24 March		Afghanistan	Nawroz Mangal	Ireland	William Porterfield	Dubai International Cricket Stadium, Dubai	Ireland by 5 wickets

==== Final Placings ====
Pos	Team	Status
1st	Qualified for 2012 ICC World Twenty20	Ireland
2nd	Qualified for 2012 ICC World Twenty20	Afghanistan
3rd	Namibia	Automatic qualification for 2013 ICC World Twenty20 Qualifier
4th	Netherlands	Automatic qualification for 2013 ICC World Twenty20 Qualifier
5th	Scotland	Automatic qualification for 2013 ICC World Twenty20 Qualifier
6th	Canada	Automatic qualification for 2013 ICC World Twenty20 Qualifier
7th	Nepal	
8th	Papua New Guinea	
9th	Kenya	
10th	Italy	
11th	Hong Kong	
12th	United States	
13th	Bermuda	
14th	Uganda	
15th	Oman	
16th	Denmark	

=== Australia in West Indies ===
ODI series
No.	Date	Home captain	Away captain	Venue	Result
ODI 3262	16 March	Darren Sammy	Shane Watson	Arnos Vale Stadium, Kingstown, St Vincent	Australia by 64 runs
ODI 3264	18 March	Darren Sammy	Shane Watson	Arnos Vale Stadium, Kingstown, St Vincent	West Indies by 5 wickets (D/L)
ODI 3266	20 March	Darren Sammy	Shane Watson	Arnos Vale Stadium, Kingstown, St Vincent	Match tied
ODI 3268	23 March	Darren Sammy	Shane Watson	Beausejour Stadium, Gros Islet, St Lucia	West Indies by 42 runs
ODI 3269	25 March	Darren Sammy	Shane Watson	Beausejour Stadium, Gros Islet, St Lucia	Australia by 30 runs
T20I series
No.	Date	Home captain	Away captain	Venue	Result
T20I 241	27 March	Darren Sammy	George Bailey	Beausejour Stadium, Gros Islet, St Lucia	Australia by 8 wickets
T20I 243	30 March	Darren Sammy	George Bailey	Kensington Oval, Bridgetown, Barbados	West Indies by 14 runs
Test series
No.	Date	Home captain	Away captain	Venue	Result
Test 2040	7–11 April	Darren Sammy	Michael Clarke	Kensington Oval, Bridgetown, Barbados	Australia by 3 wickets
Test 2041	15–19 April	Darren Sammy	Michael Clarke	Queen's Park Oval, Port of Spain, Trinidad	Match drawn
Test 2042	23–27 April	Darren Sammy	Michael Clarke	Windsor Park, Roseau, Dominica	Australia by 75 runs

=== England in Sri Lanka ===
Test series
No.	Date	Home captain	Away captain	Venue	Result
Test 2038	26–29 March	Mahela Jayawardene	Andrew Strauss	Galle International Stadium, Galle	Sri Lanka by 75 runs
Test 2039	3–7 April	Mahela Jayawardene	Andrew Strauss	P.Saravanamuttu Oval, Colombo	England by 8 wickets

=== Afghanistan vs Netherlands in United Arab Emirates ===
ODI series
No.	Date	Afghanistan captain	Netherlands captain	Venue	Result
ODI 3270	29 March	Nawroz Mangal	Peter Borren	Sharjah Cricket Stadium, Sharjah	Netherlands by 9 wickets
ODI 3271	31 March	Nawroz Mangal	Peter Borren	Sharjah Cricket Stadium, Sharjah	Afghanistan by 5 wickets
2011–13 ICC Intercontinental Cup
No.	Date	Afghanistan Captain	Netherlands Captain	Venue	Result
First-class	2–5 April	Nawroz Mangal	Peter Borren	Sharjah Cricket Stadium, Sharjah	Afghanistan by 3 wickets

=== India in South Africa ===
Only T20I
No.	Date	Home captain	Away captain	Venue	Result
T20I 242	30 March	Johan Botha	Mahendra Singh Dhoni	New Wanderers Stadium, Johannesburg	South Africa by 11 runs (D/L)
