= Zimbabwean cricket team in South Africa in 2010–11 =

	Zimbabwe	South Africa
- Dates: 8 October 2010 – 22 October 2010
Captains	Elton Chigumbura	Johan Botha (T20s); Graeme Smith (ODIs)

One Day International series
- Results: South Africa won the 3-match series 3–0
Most runs	Brendan Taylor (182)	Hashim Amla (244)
Most wickets	Shingirai Masakadza (7)	Juan Theron (11)

Twenty20 International series
- Results: South Africa won the 2-match series 2–0
Most runs	Chamu Chibhabha (111)	JP Duminy (131)
Most wickets	Prosper Utseya (4)	Juan Theron (3)

The Zimbabwean cricket team toured South Africa from 8–22 October 2010. The tour consisted of two Twenty20s (T20) and three One Day Internationals (ODIs).

== Twenty20 Series ==
=== 1st T20I ===
8 October
Scorecard

Zimbabwe; 168/4 (20 overs)	v	South Africa; 169/3 (15.5 overs)
Hamilton Masakadza 72 (63); Wayne Parnell 2/29 (4 overs)		Graeme Smith 58 (29); Prosper Utseya 2/41 (3.5 overs)

South Africa won by 7 wickets
OUTsurance Oval, Bloemfontein
Umpires: Johanes Cloete (SA) and Brian Jerling (SA)
Player of the match: Graeme Smith (SA)

- Zimbabwe won the toss and elected to bat.

=== 2nd T20I ===
10 October
Scorecard

South Africa; 194/6 (20 overs)	v	Zimbabwe; 186/7 (20 overs)
JP Duminy 96* (54); Prosper Utseya 2/28 (4 overs)		Brendan Taylor 59 (39); Juan Theron 2/26 (4 overs)

South Africa won by 8 runs
De Beers Diamond Oval, Kimberley
Umpires: Shaun George (SA) and Brian Jerling (SA)
Player of the match: JP Duminy (SA)

- South Africa won the toss and elected to bat.

== ODI series ==
=== 1st ODI ===
15 October
Scorecard

South Africa; 351/6 (50 overs)	v	Zimbabwe; 287/6 (50 overs)
Colin Ingram 124 (126); Shingirai Masakadza 4/86 (10 overs)		Brendan Taylor 145* (136); Juan Theron 3/62 (10 overs)

South Africa won by 64 runs
OUTsurance Oval, Bloemfontein
Umpires: Enamul Haque (Ban) and Marais Erasmus (SA)
Player of the match: Colin Ingram (SA)

- South Africa won the toss and elected to bat.

=== 2nd ODI ===
17 October
Scorecard

Zimbabwe; 268 (48.2 overs)	v	South Africa; 273/2 (39 overs)
Tatenda Taibu 78 (90); Juan Theron 5/44 (8.2 overs)		Hashim Amla 110 (103); Elton Chigumbura 1/33 (4 overs)

South Africa won by 8 wickets
Senwes Park, Potchefstroom
Umpires: Enamul Haque (Ban) and Brian Jerling (SA)
Player of the match: Juan Theron (SA)

- Zimbabwe won the toss and elected to bat.

=== 3rd ODI ===
22 October
Scorecard

South Africa; 399/6 (50 overs)	v	Zimbabwe; 127 (29 overs)
JP Duminy 129 (117); Shingirai Masakadza 2/95 (10 overs)		Tatenda Taibu 28 (28); Juan Theron 3/18 (6 overs)

South Africa won by 272 runs
Willowmoore Park, Benoni
Umpires: Johanes Cloete (SA) and Enamul Haque (Ban)
Player of the match: JP Duminy (SA)

- South Africa won the toss and elected to bat.
