= West Indian cricket team against Afghanistan in the UAE in 2025–26 =

International cricket tour

	Afghanistan	West Indies
- Dates: 19 – 22 January 2026
Captains	Rashid Khan	Brandon King

Twenty20 International series
- Results: Afghanistan won the 3-match series 2–1
Most runs	Darwish Rasooli (156)	Brandon King (101)
Most wickets	Mujeeb Ur Rahman (6)	Matthew Forde (4); Shamar Springer (4)
- Player of the series: Darwish Rasooli (Afg)

The West Indies cricket team toured the United Arab Emirates in January 2026 to play the Afghanistan cricket team. The tour consisted of three Twenty20 International (T20I) matches. The series formed part of both teams' preparation ahead of the 2026 Men's T20 World Cup tournament. In November 2025, the Afghanistan Cricket Board (ACB) confirmed the fixtures for the tour. All the matches were played at the Dubai International Cricket Stadium.

== Squads ==
Afghanistan	West Indies
Rashid Khan (c); Ibrahim Zadran (vc); Abdullah Ahmadzai; Allah Mohammad Ghazanfar; Azmatullah Omarzai; Darwish Rasooli; Fazalhaq Farooqi; Gulbadin Naib; Ijaz Ahmad Ahmadzai; Mohammad Ishaq; Mohammad Nabi; Mujeeb Ur Rahman; Naveen-ul-Haq; Noor Ahmad; Rahmanullah Gurbaz (wk); Sediqullah Atal; Shahidullah; Ziaur Rahman	Brandon King (c); Alick Athanaze; Keacy Carty; Johnson Charles (wk); Matthew Forde; Justin Greaves; Shimron Hetmyer; Amir Jangoo (wk); Shamar Joseph; Evin Lewis; Gudakesh Motie; Khary Pierre; Quentin Sampson; Jayden Seales; Ramon Simmonds; Shamar Springer

== T20I series ==
=== 1st T20I ===
19 January 2026
18:30 (N)
Scorecard

Afghanistan; 181/3 (20 overs)	v	West Indies; 143/9 (20 overs)
Ibrahim Zadran 87* (56); Jayden Seales 1/30 (4 overs)		Quentin Sampson 30 (24); Ziaur Rahman 3/36 (4 overs)

Afghanistan won by 38 runs
Dubai International Cricket Stadium, Dubai
Umpires: Akbar Ali (UAE) and Izatullah Safi (Afg)
Player of the match: Darwish Rasooli (Afg)

- Afghanistan won the toss and elected to bat.
- Quentin Sampson (WI) made his T20I debut.

=== 2nd T20I ===
21 January 2026
18:30 (N)
Scorecard

Afghanistan; 189/4 (20 overs)	v	West Indies; 150 (18.5 overs)
Darwish Rasooli 68 (39); Matthew Forde 2/25 (4 overs)		Brandon King 50 (41); Mujeeb Ur Rahman 4/21 (4 overs)

Afghanistan won by 39 runs
Dubai International Cricket Stadium, Dubai
Umpires: Ahmed Shah Pakteen (Afg) and Muhammad Sabir (Afg)
Player of the match: Mujeeb Ur Rahman (Afg)

- West Indies won the toss and elected to field.

=== 3rd T20I ===
22 January 2026
18:30 (N)
Scorecard

West Indies; 151/7 (20 overs)	v	Afghanistan; 136/8 (20 overs)
Brandon King 47 (35); Rashid Khan 2/13 (4 overs)		Rahmanullah Gurbaz 71 (58); Shamar Springer 4/19 (4 overs)

West Indies won by 15 runs
Dubai International Cricket Stadium, Dubai
Umpires: Ahmed Shah Pakteen (Afg) and Izatullah Safi (Afg)
Player of the match: Shamar Springer (WI)

- Afghanistan won the toss and elected to field.
- Shamar Springer (WI) took a hat-trick.
