= South Africa A cricket team in Sri Lanka in 2005–06 =

The South Africa A cricket team are touring Sri Lanka in September and October 2005. South Africa A are a team made up of the second tier of South African cricketers, just below the national team. They played Sri Lanka A for two first class matches, and the hosts won the first by a convincing margin. Sri Lanka were also looking on course to win the second but for an attritional batting effort from Hashim Amla and Johan Botha, who lasted 41 overs to draw the final game, meaning that the hosts won the two match series 1–0. Sanjeewa Weerakoon took 19 wickets in two games for Sri Lanka A, while opening batsman Avishka Gunawardene impressed with the bat, scoring 207 runs in four innings. For South Africa, no one individual really impressed, as captain Jacques Rudolph was the top-scorer 149 runs in four innings while Monde Zondeki took nine wickets at an average of 20.77. The tourists now start a three-team one-day tournament, also including New Zealand A.

== Squads ==
- South Africa A: Jacques Rudolph (captain), Thami Tsolekile (wicket-keeper), Paul Adams, Hashim Amla, Johan Botha, Zander de Bruyn, Jean-Paul Duminy, Tyron Henderson, Justin Ontong, Andrew Puttick, Dale Steyn, Alfonso Thomas, Johan van der Wath
- Sri Lanka A: Avishka Gunawardene (captain), Prasanna Jayawardene (wicket-keeper), Ian Daniel, Pradeep Jayaprakashdaran, Charith Jayaweera, Kaushal Lokuarachchi, Dilhara Lokuhettige, Suraj Mohamed, Jehan Mubarak, Ruchira Perera, Upul Tharanga, Michael Vandort, Sajeewa Wirekoon, Chanka Wijesinghe

== Schedule ==
This is for the first-class series only. For the one-day series, please see Sri Lanka A-team Tri-Series in 2005-06.

Date	Match	Venue
September; 4-5	Sri Lanka Development XI v SA A, non-FC warm-up	Moratuwa Stadium
7–10	SL A v SA A, 1st match	Nondescripts Ground, Colombo
14–16	SL A v SA A, 2nd match	Rangiri Dambulla International Stadium

== Match details ==
=== Sri Lanka Development XI v South Africa A, 4–5 September ===
Match drawn

In a match shortened to one day by rain, South Africa A declared on 172 for 6, Jacques Rudolph top-scoring with 37 while Dilruwan Perera took two for 51. Two players retired. In 39 overs, the Development XI were bowled out to 139 for 9, Paul Adams taking three for 18 and Justin Ontong two for 28. Amila Sandaruwan top scored with 41 as the hosts made 148 for 9. Cricinfo scorecard

=== Tour match, Sri Lanka A v South Africa A, 7–9 September ===
Sri Lanka A won by six wickets

A strong Sri Lanka A side, including three players who appeared in the recent ODI series against Bangladesh, converted a 21-run first innings defeat into a comfortable six-wicket victory. Sri Lanka A had put South Africa A in to bat, but conceded 68 runs to the opening partnership of Andrew Puttick and Jacques Rudolph. Three Sri Lankan bowlers got wickets, yet South Africa fought well to make it to 157 for 3. But then Sajeewa Weerakoon started a burst, as three wickets fell in 13 balls without the scoreboard ticking over. Johan Botha stayed in for 90 minutes, allowing Zander de Bruyn to hit out, but Weerakoon returned to end with figures of six for 59, while de Bruyn was left stranded on 100. South Africa's bowlers shared out wickets, Monde Zondeki taking three for 54 as Sri Lanka A crashed to 126 for 6. However, spinner Kaushal Lokuarachchi made an entertaining half-century, and despite three wickets from Paul Adams, Sri Lanka A made it to 224.

In the second innings, Weerakoon got his best first-class returns, dismissing four South African batsmen for 0 - including centurion de Bruyn - as South Africa collapsed twice, first from 71 for 1 to 89 for 6, and then from 171 for 7 to 173. Weerakoon ended with seven for 47 - for a match total of 13 for 106 - as Sri Lanka A were set 200 to win. Avishka Gunawardene repaired his first-innings duck, making 83 as Sri Lanka A chased down the target with ease - Zondeki getting the best figures again, but this time only one wicket for 27. Cricinfo scorecard

=== Tour match: Sri Lanka A v South Africa A, 14–16 September ===
Match drawn

This match was moved from Kandy to Dambulla due to a waterlogged ground at the Asgiriya Stadium, and consequently shortened from four to three days as the plans had to be reorganised. In addition, a wet pitch shortened the first day to 65 overs, but when it finally got underway South Africa A immediately established dominance. Zondeki got three wickets early on, as the hosts made it to 99 for 5, but an entertaining 45-run stand between Tharanga and Lokuhettige took Sri Lanka past 150. Charith Jayaweera also hit three fours in a half-hour unbeaten 17, and Sri Lanka A posted 206 in 48 overs. Jacques Rudolph and Hashim Amla were in control of the bowlers in the evening session, making their way to 71 for 1, but Weerakoon continued on his fantastic series with six wickets - including Rudolph, Amla and Zander de Bruyn - for 66 runs. South Africa A were reeling on 148 for 6, but Tyron Henderson blitzed his way to 50, adding 72 in 12 overs with Paul Adams, as the tourists earned a 48-run lead.

South Africa A once again got a good start with the ball, Zondeki getting Tharanga and Ian Daniel out caught, but Lokuhettige once again defied them, as he and captain Gunawardene were batting on the third morning with a slender lead of 127. Lokuhettige hit six fours and one six on the way to 51, and his 79-run partnership brought Sri Lanka out of trouble. Johan Botha eventually had him caught, but the damage had been done, and Gunawardene could also get his century as Sri Lanka A set the tourists 219 to win. South Africa A were immediately set on the back foot, losing openers Puttick and Rudolph early to have the score at five runs for two wickets, and Jayaweera then took three wickets as South Africa A struggled to 57 for 5. Jayaweera, however, was not allowed to bowl, possibly due to the light conditions, and Weerakoon went wicketless as Amla and Botha survived 41 overs and two and a half hours to draw the game. Nevertheless, the hosts won the series 1–0. (Cricinfo scorecard)
