= Quentin Sampson =

Guyanese cricketer (born 4 August 2000)

Personal information
- Born: 4 August 2000 (age 26); Guyana
- Batting: Right-handed
- Bowling: Right-arm medium-fast
- Role: Batter

International information
- National side: West Indies (2026-present)
- T20I debut (cap 110): 19 January 2026 v Afghanistan
- Last T20I: 22 January 2026 v Afghanistan

Domestic team information
- Years: Team
- 2023–present: Guyana
- 2025–present: Guyana Amazon Warriors (squad no. 43)

Career statistics
Competition	T20I	LA	T20
Matches	3	2	12
Runs scored	35	13	276
Batting average	11.66	6.50	27.60
100s/50s	0/0	0/0	0/2
Top score	30	13	76
Catches/stumpings	1/–	0/–	2/–
- Source: Cricinfo, 27 January 2026

Quentin Sampson (born 4 August 2000) is a Guyanese cricketer who plays for Guyana in West Indian domestic cricket as a top order batsman. He made his international debut for the West Indies cricket team in January 2026 against Afghanistan.

== Early life ==
Quinten Sampson was raised in the village of Caria Caria, Essequibo, Guyana, where he was introduced to cricket through informal softball and tape-ball matches played in his local community. His parents Eversley Sampson and Lloyd Sampson, helped organize village games that allowed their son to play with senior team members. On finishing primary school, Quinten moved to secondary school on the Essequibo Coast where he was introduced to hard ball cricket by his teacher.

== Career ==
Sampson made his West Indies cricket team debut during the West Indian cricket team and Afghanistan bilateral series in preparation for the 2026 ICC Men's T20 World Cup. Sampson played in all three games. He was then also announced as part of the squad during the West Indies T20I series in South Africa.

In January 2026, he was named in the West Indies squad for the 2026 ICC Men's T20 World Cup tournament.
