= Saad Janjua =

Pakistani-born Singaporean cricketer

Personal information
- Full name: Saad Khan Janjua
- Born: 7 November 1973 (age 53); Lahore, Punjab, Pakistan
- Batting: Right-handed
- Bowling: Right-arm medium

International information
- National side: Singapore

Domestic team information
- Years: Team
- 1995/96: Pakistan Railways
- 1998/99: Lahore City
- 1999/00: Pakistan Customs
- 2000/01: Lahore Whites
- 2001/02: Islamabad
- 2002/03: Zarai Taraqiati Bank Limited
- 2003: Essex Cricket Board
- 2004/05: Khan Research Laboratories

Career statistics
Competition	First-class	List A
Matches	26	25
Runs scored	387	378
Batting average	13.34	27.00
100s/50s	0/0	0/3
Top score	39	91
Balls bowled	3,395	1,095
Wickets	77	24
Bowling average	26.38	41.62
5 wickets in innings	2	0
10 wickets in match	0	0
Best bowling	5/39	3/28
Catches/stumpings	6/–	8/–
- Source: Cricinfo, 19 April 2022

Saad Khan Janjua (born 7 November 1973) is a Pakistani-born Singaporean cricketer. Janjua is a right-handed batsman who bowls right-arm medium pace. He was born at Lahore, Punjab.

== Domestic career ==
Janjua made his first-class debut for Pakistan Railways against Allied Bank Limited in the 1994/95 season. A journeyman within Pakistani domestic cricket, Janjua played 26 first-class matches during his domestic career for no more than 7 teams besides Pakistan Railways: Lahore City, Pakistan Customs, Lahore Whites, Islamabad, Zarai Taraqiati Bank Limited and Khan Research Laboratories. In his career total of 26 first-class matches, he scored 387 runs at a batting average of 13.14, with a high score of 39. In the field he took 6 catches and with the ball he took 77 wickets at a bowling average of 26.38, with 2 five wicket hauls and best figures of 5/39.

It was in Lahore City that he made his debut in List A cricket against the Agriculture Development Bank of Pakistan. Once more, in List A cricket he was something of a journeyman on the domestic circuit in Pakistan. He played List A cricket in Pakistan for 6 teams besides Lahore City: Pakistan Customs, Lahore Whites, Islamabad, Pakistan Cricket Board Whites, Zarai Taraqiati Bank Limited and Khan Research Laboratories. Janjua also had a taste of County Cricket in England for the Essex Cricket Board. He played 2 List A matches for the Board against the Surrey Cricket Board in the 2nd round of the 2003 Cheltenham & Gloucester Trophy which was held in 2002, and Essex in the 3rd round of the same competition which was played in 2003. In total, he played 25 List A matches during his domestic career. In these 25 matches he scored 378 runs at an average of 27.00, with 3 half centuries and a high score of 91. In the field he took 8 catches, while with the ball he took 24 wickets an average of 41.62, with best figures of 3/28.

== International career ==
Janjua first played for Singapore against Guernsey in the 2009 ICC World Cricket League Division Six. He played in all their matches during the tournament, including in the final against Bahrain, which Singapore won by 68 runs. His next outing for Singapore came in the 2009 ACC Twenty20 Cup, where he played in all of Singapore's matches. Janjua has since played for Singapore in 2010 ICC World Cricket League Division Five and in the 2010 ACC Trophy Elite.

Janjua was Singapore Cricket Association's director of coaching since 2010 and as chief executive since 2015. Singapore's Safe Sports Commission received some complaints in August 2024 about incidents of verbal abuse by Janjua on some players some time before the 2023 SEA Games in Cambodia. After investigations conducted between October 2024 and February 2025, a disciplinary committee was convened. After deliberations, Janjua was suspended from coaching for one year from 15 September 2025, and from being a sports administrator until a course on Safe Sports was attended. Janjua was reportedly to have completed the course immediately after the ruling, therefore lifted the suspension on being a sports administrator.

== Personal life ==
Saad Khan has two daughters and a son.
