= Sushil Nadkarni =

Indian-American cricketer

Personal information
- Full name: Sushilkumar Suhas Nadkarni
- Born: 31 May 1976 (age 50); Gangtok, Sikkim, India
- Batting: Left-handed
- Bowling: Right-arm off spin
- Role: Batsman

Domestic team information
- Years: Team
- 1995/96: Maharashtra
- FC debut: 13 December 1995 Maharashtra v Baroda
- Last FC: 17 January 1996 Maharashtra v Gujarat
- LA debut: 9 January 1996 Maharashtra v Bombay
- Last LA: 24 January 1996 Maharashtra v Saurashtra

Career statistics
Competition	First-class	List A
Matches	3	3
Runs scored	47	91
Batting average	15.66	30.33
100s/50s	0/0	0/1
Top score	43	53
Catches/stumpings	1/0	0/0
- Source: CricketArchive, 5 October 2008

Sushilkumar Suhas Nadkarni (born 31 May 1976) is an Indian-American cricketer. A left-handed batsman and off spin bowler, he has played for the United States national cricket team since 2006, and previously played for India Under-19s and played first-class and List A cricket for Maharashtra.

== Biography ==
Born in Gangtok, Sikkim, India in 1976, Sushil Nadkarni was considered to be one of India's most promising young players in the mid-1990s. In the 1994/95 Indian Under-19 season, he averaged 99, gaining him a place on the India Under-19 tour of Australia. He played two Tests and two ODIs on the tour. He played six times for Maharashtra the following season, but was unable to gain a regular place in the side.

After gaining good results in engineering exams, he emigrated to the United States, eventually settling in Texas. He first came to attention in the US in the 2005 inter-state competition, when he scored 171 and 214 in successive matches.

He first played for the US in August 2006, playing in the ICC Americas Championship in King City, Ontario. He made his Twenty20 debut on 9 February 2010, for the United States in the 2010 ICC World Twenty20 Qualifier in the United Arab Emirates. In January 2012, he was declared captain of the USA cricket team. He most recently represented his adopted country in the ICC Twenty20 Cup Qualifier 2012.
