= West Indian cricket team in South Africa in 2025–26 =

International cricket tour

	South Africa	West Indies
- Dates: 27 – 31 January 2026
Captains	Aiden Markram	Shai Hope (Note: Roston Chase captained West Indies in the 1st T20I.)

Twenty20 International series
- Results: South Africa won the 3-match series 2–1
Most runs	Quinton de Kock (143)	Shimron Hetmyer (171)
Most wickets	Keshav Maharaj (5)	Akeal Hosein (3); Gudakesh Motie (3)
- Player of the series: Quinton de Kock (SA)

The West Indies cricket team toured South Africa in January 2026 to play the South Africa cricket team. The tour consisted of three Twenty20 International (T20I) matches. The series formed part of both teams' preparation ahead of the 2026 Men's T20 World Cup tournament. In March 2025, the Cricket South Africa (CSA) confirmed the fixtures for the tour, as a part of the 2025 home international season.

Originally, the series included five T20Is. Later in September 2025, it was reduced to three T20Is due to a clash with the T20 World Cup.

== Squads ==
South Africa	West Indies
Aiden Markram (c); Corbin Bosch; Dewald Brevis; Quinton de Kock (wk); Rubin Hermann; Marco Jansen; George Linde; Keshav Maharaj; Kwena Maphaka; Lungi Ngidi; Anrich Nortje; Kagiso Rabada; Ryan Rickelton (wk); Jason Smith; Tristan Stubbs	Shai Hope (c, wk); Johnson Charles; Roston Chase; Matthew Forde; Shimron Hetmyer; Jason Holder; Akeal Hosein; Shamar Joseph; Brandon King; Gudakesh Motie; Rovman Powell; Sherfane Rutherford; Quentin Sampson; Jayden Seales; Romario Shepherd

== T20I series ==
=== 1st T20I ===
27 January 2026
18:00 (N)
Scorecard

West Indies; 173/7 (20 overs)	v	South Africa; 176/1 (17.5 overs)
Shimron Hetmyer 48 (32); George Linde 3/25 (4 overs)		Aiden Markram 86* (47); Roston Chase 1/31 (4 overs)

South Africa won by 9 wickets
Boland Park, Paarl
Umpires: Stephen Harris (SA) and Bongani Jele (SA)
Player of the match: George Linde (SA)

- South Africa won the toss and elected to field.

=== 2nd T20I ===
29 January 2026
18:00 (N)
Scorecard

West Indies; 221/4 (20 overs)	v	South Africa; 225/3 (17.3 overs)
Shimron Hetmyer 75 (42); Keshav Maharaj 2/22 (4 overs)		Quinton de Kock 115 (49); Akeal Hosein 2/41 (4 overs)

South Africa won by 7 wickets
Centurion Park, Centurion
Umpires: Stephen Harris (SA) and Arno Jacobs (SA)
Player of the match: Quinton de Kock (SA)

- South Africa won the toss and elected to field.

=== 3rd T20I ===
31 January 2026
18:00 (N)
Scorecard

West Indies; 114/3 (10 overs)	v	South Africa; 118/6 (10 overs)
Shimron Hetmyer 48* (22); Kwena Maphaka 1/12 (1 over)		Quinton de Kock 28 (14); Gudakesh Motie 3/17 (2 overs)

West Indies won by 6 runs (DLS method)
Wanderers Stadium, Johannesburg
Umpires: Arno Jacobs (SA) and Bongani Jele (SA)
Player of the match: Gudakesh Motie (WI)

- South Africa won the toss and elected to field
- The match was reduced to 10 overs per side due to bad weather.
- South Africa were set a revised target of 125 runs from 10 overs due to bad weather.
