= Johan Botha (cricketer) =

South African cricketer

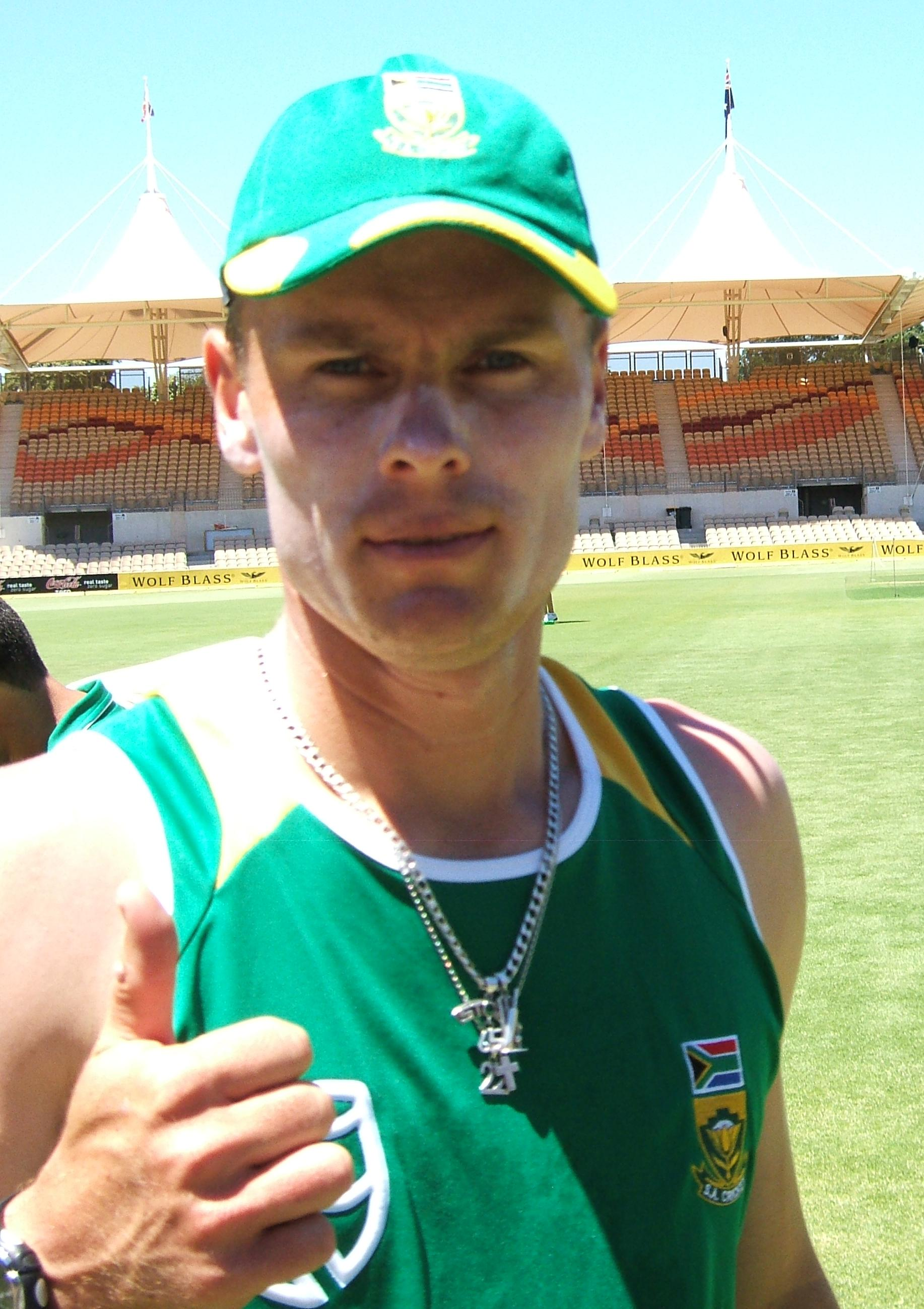
- Botha training with South Africa in 2009

Personal information
- Full name: Johan Botha
- Born: 2 May 1982 (age 44); Johannesburg, Transvaal, South Africa
- Batting: Right-handed
- Bowling: Right-arm off break
- Role: All-rounder

International information
- National side: South Africa (2005–2012)
- Test debut (cap 299): 2 January 2006 v Australia
- Last Test: 20 November 2010 v Pakistan
- ODI debut (cap 80): 16 November 2005 v India
- Last ODI: 3 March 2012 v New Zealand
- T20I debut (cap 13): 9 January 2006 v Australia
- Last T20I: 2 October 2012 v India

Domestic team information
- Years: Team
- 2000/01–2003/04: Eastern Province
- 2004/05: Border
- 2004/05–2010/11: Warriors
- 2009–2012: Rajasthan Royals
- 2011: Northamptonshire
- 2011/12–2014/15: Adelaide Strikers
- 2012/13–2014/15: South Australia
- 2013: Delhi Daredevils
- 2015: Kolkata Knight Riders
- 2015: Trinidad and Tobago Red Steel
- 2015/16–2017/18: Sydney Sixers
- 2018/19–2020/21: Hobart Hurricanes

Career statistics
Competition	Test	ODI	T20I	FC
Matches	5	78	40	90
Runs scored	83	609	201	4,015
Batting average	20.75	19.03	18.27	31.61
100s/50s	0/0	0/0	0/0	1/27
Top score	25	46	34	109
Balls bowled	1,017	3,823	774	14,656
Wickets	17	72	37	220
Bowling average	33.70	40.50	22.24	32.28
5 wickets in innings	0	0	0	7
10 wickets in match	0	0	0	1
Best bowling	4/56	4/19	3/16	6/34
Catches/stumpings	3/–	36/–	17/–	63/–
- Source: ESPNcricinfo, 25 July 2021

Johan Botha (born 2 May 1982) is a South African-Australian cricket coach, cricketer, and long-distance runner who played for the South African national team between 2005 and 2012. He moved to Australia in 2012 to play in the country's domestic leagues, and in 2016 became an Australian citizen. In January 2019, he retired from all forms of the game. However, in December 2020, he made a comeback as a replacement player for the Hobart Hurricanes in the 2020–21 Big Bash League.

== Early life and career ==
Botha was born in Johannesburg but attended Grey High School in Port Elizabeth, the same school that other notable South African cricketers such as Graeme Pollock attended, and captained a South Africa Schools cricket team. In the early parts of his cricket career he was a medium-pace bowler, but when he was playing cricket for the Warriors, future South African coach Mickey Arthur suggested that he should switch bowling style to off break, which Botha then bowled for the rest of his professional career. Once he had made the switch, he also focused on learning to bowl a doosra, a ball which turns in the opposite direction to a normal off break.

A year after changing bowling styles, Botha travelled with South Africa A, South Africa's second XI team, to Sri Lanka. He took key wickets and scored runs to put his name up as a potential future Test spinner for South Africa.

== Test debut and throwing allegations ==
Botha made his Test debut against Australia at the Sydney Cricket Ground in January 2006 during the 2005–06 tour, and claimed batsman Mike Hussey as his first Test wicket. However, he was reported for throwing the ball at the conclusion of the match. He was allowed to play several games during the 2005–06 VB Series, but in February, was suspended from bowling following an analysis by bowling expert Bruce Elliott. He hoped to return to bowling after an examination by the ICC in August 2006, but he was found still to be straightening his arm more than the acceptable 15 degrees.

On 21 November 2006, Botha's action was passed by the International Cricket Council and he was again eligible for selection by the South African national team.

On 14 April 2009, Botha was again reported for suspected illegal action. The match officials cited concern over two components of Botha's repertoire, his quicker ball and his doosra, after the completion of fourth ODI against Australia at Port Elizabeth.

== Captaincy of the Protea T20I and ODI team ==
On 20 August 2010, Graeme Smith announced that he was to surrender the captaincy in T20 Internationals but continue playing in the format. Cricket South Africa subsequently handed over the captaincy to his deputy Botha. Botha also took the One-Day International captaincy after the 2011 Cricket World Cup when Smith gave up his ODI captaincy. The deciding factor was that Botha had led South Africa to a series win against Australia earlier in 2010 when Smith was absent with injury.

== Coaching career ==
Botha was the fielding coach for the Islamabad United and Karachi Kings in the 2017 and 2020 seasons of the Pakistan Super League respectively. He has been the Assistant coach and the Head Coach of Multan Sultans in 2018 and 2019 seasons respectively. In 2020, he was appointed the Head Coach of Islamabad United for the 2021 edition of the PSL. He is also the Head Coach for the Guyana Amazon Warriors in the Caribbean Premier League since 2018. He was the bowling coaching for Seattle Orcas in the inaugural season in 2023. In May 2024, he was appointed as the new head coach of Brisbane Heat and Queensland cricket team for the next three years. After two seasons in the roles, Botha resigned from both positions ahead of the 2026–27 season, following reports of player unrest.

== See also ==
- List of international cricketers called for throwing
