= List of 2025 SA20 auction and personnel signings =

2024–25 SA20 players auctions

General information
- Sport: Cricket
- Date: 1 October 2024
- Time: 16:00 SAST
- Location: Cape Town, South Africa

Overview
- League: SA20
- Team: 6

This is a list of auction and personnel signings for the 2024–25 SA20 cricket tournament.

== Background ==
For the third season of the SA20, the salary cap was increased by R 5,100,000 to R39.1 million (US$2.65 million) per side. Each team had a maximum squad size of 19 players, at least two of whom had to be South African. One of the 19 players had to be a wildcard selection, and one a rookie player.

== Pre-signed and retained players ==
All South African players bought at the 2023–24 SA20 auction were on two-year contracts. Teams had the option to retain, trade or buy out the contracts of these players.

Team	Durban's Super Giants	Joburg Super Kings	MI Cape Town	Paarl Royals	Pretoria Capitals	Sunrisers Eastern Cape
Retained players	Keshav Maharaj; Noor Ahmad; Matthew Breetzke; Junior Dala; Quinton de Kock; Heinrich Klaasen; Wiaan Mulder; Naveen-ul-Haq; Bryce Parsons; Dwaine Pretorius; Jason Smith; JJ Smuts; Prenelan Subrayen	Faf du Plessis; Moeen Ali; Nandre Burger; Gerald Coetzee; Leus du Plooy; Donovan Ferreira; Sibonelo Makhanya; Imran Tahir; David Wiese; Lizaad Williams	Dewald Brevis; Chris Benjamin; Connor Esterhuizen; Thomas Kaber; Rashid Khan; George Linde; Delano Potgieter; Kagiso Rabada; Ryan Rickelton; Nuwan Thushara; Rassie van der Dussen	David Miller; Keith Dudegon; Bjorn Fortuin; Kwena Maphaka; Lungi Ngidi; Nqaba Peter; Andile Phehlukwayo; Lhuan-dre Pretorius; John Turner; Mitchell van Buuren; Codi Yusuf	Eathan Bosch; Daryn Dupavillon; Will Jacks; Senuran Muthusamy; James Neesham; Anrich Nortje; Migael Pretorius; Rilee Rossouw; Steve Stolk; Tiaan van Vuuren; Kyle Verreynne	Aiden Markram; Tom Abell; Ottniel Baartman; Liam Dawson; Simon Harmer; Jordan Hermann; Marco Jansen; Patrick Kruger; Caleb Seleka; Andile Simelane; Tristan Stubbs; Beyers Swanepoel
Pre-signed players	Brandon King; Kane Williamson; Chris Woakes	Jonny Bairstow; Maheesh Theekshana; Devon Conway	Trent Boult; Azmatullah Omarzai; Ben Stokes	Joe Root; Sam Hain; Dinesh Karthik; Mujeeb Ur Rahman; Jacob Bethell	Rahmanullah Gurbaz; Will Smeed	Roelof van der Merwe; Craig Overton; Zak Crawley
Traded players		Tabraiz Shamsi		Dayyaan Galiem		

=== Summary ===
Pre-Auction summary
Team	Retained		Pre-signed		Total	Slots to fill	Funds remaining (in ZAR millions)
Team	Domestic	Overseas	Domestic	Overseas	Total	Slots to fill	Funds remaining (in ZAR millions)
Durban	11	2	0	3	16	1	2.35m
Johannesburg	8	2	1	3	14	3	3.925m
Cape Town	8	3	0	3	14	3	8.275m
Paarl	10	1	0	5	16	1	11.95m
Pretoria	10	2	0	2	14	3	4.575m
Eastern Cape	10	2	0	3	15	2	2.845m

- Maximums: Overseas players: 10; Squad size: 19; Budget: ZAR 36.1m

== Player auction ==
A total of 200 players (110 South Africa and 90 overseas) entered the auction pool, with only 13 open places available.

=== Auction results ===
Name	National team	Playing role	Price (in ZAR)	Team
Reeza Hendricks	South Africa	Batsman	4,300,000	MI Cape Town
Colin Ingram	South Africa	Batsman	175,000	MI Cape Town
Marques Ackerman	South Africa	Batsman	800,000	Pretoria Capitals
Rubin Hermann	South Africa	Wicket-keeper	175,000	Paarl Royals
Wihan Lubbe	South Africa	All-rounder	175,000	Joburg Super Kings
Evan Jones	South Africa	All-rounder	175,000	Joburg Super Kings
Okuhle Cele	South Africa	Fast bowler	175,000	Sunrisers Eastern Cape
Richard Gleeson	England	Fast bowler	2,300,000	Sunrisers Eastern Cape
Dane Piedt	South Africa	Spin bowler	175,000	MI Cape Town
Evin Lewis	West Indies	Batsman	1,500,000	Pretoria Capitals
Shamar Joseph	West Indies	Fast bowler	425,000	Durban's Super Giants
Doug Bracewell	New Zealand	Fast bowler	175,000	Joburg Super Kings
Kyle Simmonds	South Africa	All-rounder	175,000	Pretoria Capitals

== Wildcard picks ==
Each team had until 30 December 2024 to select an additional players. The player's fee is excluded from the salary cap.

- Durban's Super Giants: Marcus Stoinis
- Joburg Super Kings: Matheesha Pathirana
- MI Cape Town: Corbin Bosch
- Paarl Royals: Jacob Bethell
- Pretoria Capitals: Liam Livingstone
- Sunrisers Eastern Cape: David Bedingham

== Rookie Draft ==
The rookie draft was held on 1 October 2024. Each team could select one player.

- MI Cape Town: Tristan Luus
- Pretoria Capitals: Kegan-Lion Cachet
- Paarl Royals: Dewan Marais
- Joburg Super Kings: JP King
- Durban's Super Giants: CJ King
- Sunrisers Eastern Cape: Daniel Smith
