= List of 2024 SA20 auction and personnel signings =

2023–24 SA20 players auction

General information
- Sport: Cricket
- Date: 27 September 2023
- Time: 16:00 SAST
- Location: Durban, South Africa

Overview
- League: SA20
- Team: 6

This is a list of auction and personnel signings for the 2024 SA20 cricket tournament.

== Background ==
For the league's second season, the salary cap was increased by R 5,100,000 to R39.1 million (US$2.65 million) per side. Each team had a maximum squad size of 19, at least ten of whom had to be South African. Each team had to make one wildcard selection and select one rookie player.

== Pre-signed and retained players ==
All South African players bought at 2022–23 SA20 auction were on two-year contracts. Teams had the option to retain, trade or buy out these contracts.

Teams	Durban's Super Giants	Joburg Super Kings	MI Cape Town	Paarl Royals	Pretoria Capitals	Sunrisers Eastern Cape
Retained Players	Kyle Abbott; Matthew Breetzke; Junior Dala; Heinrich Klaasen; Dilshan Madushanka; Keshav Maharaj; Wiaan Mulder; Keemo Paul; Dwaine Pretorius; Jon-Jon Smuts	Nandre Burger; Donovan Ferreira; Reeza Hendricks; Sibonelo Makhanya; Aaron Phangiso; Leus du Plooy; Kyle Simmonds; Lizaad Williams	Rassie van der Dussen; Beuran Hendricks; Duan Jansen; George Linde; Delano Potgieter; Ryan Rickelton; Grant Roelofsen; Olly Stone	Ferisco Adams; Mitchell Van Buuren; Bjorn Fortuin; Evan Jones; Wihan Lubbe; Lungi Ngidi; Andile Phehlukwayo; Jason Roy; Tabraiz Shamsi; Dane Vilas; Codi Yusuf	Corbin Bosch; Eathan Bosch; Theunis de Bruyn; Shane Dadswell; Colin Ingram; Will Jacks; Senuran Muthusamy; Wayne Parnell; Adil Rashid; Rilee Rossouw	Tom Abell; Temba Bavuma; Brydon Carse; Sarel Erwee; Ayabulela Gqamane; Simon Harmer; Jordan Hermann; Marco Jansen; Sisanda Magala; Adam Rossington; Tristan Stubbs
Pre-signed players	Naveen-ul-Haq; Quinton De Kock; Kyle Mayers; Bhanuka Rajapaksa; Prenelan Subrayen; Reece Topley	Moeen Ali; Gerald Coetzee; Sam Cook; Zahir Khan; Faf du Plessis; David Wiese	Tom Banton; Dewald Brevis; Sam Curran; Liam Livingstone; Rashid Khan; Kagiso Rabada	Jos Buttler; Kwena Maphaka; Obed McCoy; David Miller	Jimmy Neesham; Anrich Nortje; Migael Pretorius	Ottniel Baartman; Liam Dawson; Dawid Malan; Aiden Markram

=== Summary ===
Pre-auction summary
Team	Retained		Pre-signed		Total	Open slots to fill	Funds remaining
Team	Domestic	Overseas	Domestic	Overseas	Total	Open slots to fill	Funds remaining
Durban	8	2	2	4	16	3	R1.68 million (US$113,328.82)
Johannesburg	7	1	2	4	14	5	R6.1 million (US$412,719.89)
Cape Town	7	1	2	4	14	5	R5.05 million (US$341,677.94)
Paarl	10	1	2	2	15	4	R8.87 million (US$599,797.02)
Pretoria	8	2	2	1	13	6	R9.74 million (US$658,795.67)
Eastern Cape	9	2	2	2	15	4	R1.79 million (US$121,109.61)

- Maximums: Overseas players: 8; Squad size: 19; Budget: R39.1m

== Player auction ==
A total of 257 players (135 South Africa and 122 Overseas) entered the auction pool, with only 25 open places. During the main auction, 15 players were sold along with 6 rookie players were drafted.

Name	National team	Playing role	Price (in ZAR)	Team
Wayne Madsen	Italy	Batsman	850,000	Joburg Super Kings
Paul Stirling	Ireland	Batsman	425,000	Pretoria Capitals
Kyle Verreynne	South Africa	Wicketkeeper	175,000	Pretoria Capitals
Chris Benjamin	England	Wicketkeeper	175,000	MI Cape Town
Matthew Boast	South Africa	Allrounder	1,600,000	Pretoria Capitals
Dayyaan Galiem	South Africa	Allrounder	1,600,000	Joburg Super Kings
Romario Shepherd	West Indies	Bowler	850,000	Joburg Super Kings
John Turner	England	Bowler	425,000	Paarl Royals
Daryn Dupavillon	South Africa	Bowler	600,000	Pretoria Capitals
Caleb Seleka	South Africa	Bowler	175,000	Sunrisers Eastern Cape
Lorcan Tucker	Ireland	Wicketkeeper	175,000	Paarl Royals
Beyers Swanepoel	South Africa	Allrounder	600,000	Sunrisers Eastern Cape
Jason Smith	South Africa	Allrounder	175,000	Durban's Super Giants
Nealan van Heerden	South Africa	Bowler	175,000	MI Cape Town
Thomas Kaber	South Africa	Bowler	175,000	MI Cape Town

=== Rookie picks ===
A rookie was classified as a South African player aged 22 or younger on the day of the auction and who had not been previously drafted in the league.

All six teams were mandated to select a player from the rookie draft. A player meeting the definition of a rookie could be bought in the regular auction stage, but if not chosen became eligible for the rookie draft, which took place at the end of the regular auction.

Each rookie player had a set value of R75,000, which was deducted from the team's available salary cap prior to the auction. The order of selection of the rookie draft was in reverse order of the final position of each team in the previous season.

- Durban's Super Giants: Bryce Parsons
- Joburg Super Kings: Ronan Hermann
- MI Cape Town: Connor Esterhuizen
- Pretoria Capitals: Steve Stolk
- Paarl Royals: Lhuan-dre Pretorius
- Sunrisers Eastern Cape: Andile Simelane

== Wildcard picks ==
Each team had until 30 December 2023 to select a wildcard player. This player's fee was excluded from the salary cap.

- Durban's Super Giants: Nicholas Pooran
- Joburg Super Kings: Imran Tahir
- MI Cape Town: Jofra Archer
- Pretoria Capitals: Phil Salt
- Paarl Royals: Fabian Allen
- Sunrisers Eastern Cape: Craig Overton
