= List of 2026 SA20 auctions and personnel signings =

2026 SA20 players auctions

General information
- Sport: Cricket
- Date: 9 September 2025
- Time: 14:00 SAST
- Location: Johannesburg, South Africa

Overview
- League: SA20
- Team: 6

This is a list of auction and personnel signings for the 2026 SA20 cricket tournament.

== Pre-signed and retained players ==
All South African players bought at the 2025 SA20 auction were on two-year contracts. Teams had the option to retain, trade or buy out the contracts of these players.

Team	Durban's Super Giants	Joburg Super Kings	MI Cape Town	Paarl Royals	Pretoria Capitals	Sunrisers Eastern Cape
Retained players	Noor Ahmad	Faf du Plessis	Trent Boult; Rashid Khan; Ryan Rickelton; George Linde; Corbin Bosch	Lhuan-dre Pretorius; Bjorn Fortuin; David Miller		Tristan Stubbs
Pre-signed players	Jos Buttler; Sunil Narine	Richard Gleeson; Akeal Hosein; James Vince	Nicholas Pooran	Sikandar Raza; Mujeeb Ur Rahman	Will Jacks; Sherfane Rutherford	Jonny Bairstow; Adam Milne; AM Ghazanfar

=== Summary ===
Pre-Auction summary
Team	Retained		Pre-signed			Total	Slots to fill	Funds remaining (in ZAR millions)
Team	Domestic	Overseas	Domestic	Overseas	Wildcard	Total	Slots to fill	Funds remaining (in ZAR millions)
Durban's Super Giants	0	1	0	2	1	4	15	29.5m
Joburg Super Kings	1	0	0	3	1	5	14	21.5m
MI Cape Town	3	2	0	1	1	7	12	11.5m
Paarl Royals	3	1	0	1	1	6	13	14.5m
Pretoria Capitals	0	1	0	1	1	3	16	32.5m
Sunrisers Eastern Cape	1	0	0	3	1	5	14	21.5m

== Player auction ==
A total of 549 players (308 South Africa and 241 overseas) entered the auction pool, with only 84 open places available and Right to Match (RTM) card was introduced this season with each team having one RTM card.

=== Auction results ===
Name	National team	Playing role	Price (in ZAR)	Team	Notes
Keshav Maharaj	South Africa	Spin bowler	1,700,000	Pretoria Capitals	
Kwena Maphaka	South Africa	Fast bowler	2,300,000	Durban's Super Giants	
Quinton de Kock	South Africa	Wicket keeper	2,400,000	Sunrisers Eastern Cape	
Aiden Markram	South Africa	Batsman	14,000,000	Durban's Super Giants	
Lungi Ngidi	South Africa	Fast bowler	2,300,000	Pretoria Capitals	
Dewald Brevis	South Africa	All-rounder	16,500,000	Pretoria Capitals	
Wiaan Mulder	South Africa	All-rounder	9,000,000	Joburg Super Kings	
Matthew Breetzke	South Africa	Batsman	6,100,000	Sunrisers Eastern Cape	
Devon Conway	New Zealand	Batsman	325,000	Durban's Super Giants	
Rassie van der Dussen	South Africa	Batsman	5,200,000	MI Cape Town	
Nandre Burger	South Africa	Fast bowler	6,300,000	Joburg Super Kings	RTM from Durban's Super Giants
Anrich Nortje	South Africa	Fast bowler	5,000,000	Sunrisers Eastern Cape	
Senuran Muthusamy	South Africa	Spin bowler	1,500,000	Sunrisers Eastern Cape	
Lizaad Williams	South Africa	Fast bowler	2,400,000	Pretoria Capitals	
Gerald Coetzee	South Africa	Fast bowler	7,400,000	Durban's Super Giants	
Ottneil Baartman	South Africa	Fast bowler	5,100,000	Paarl Royals	
Gudakesh Motie	West Indies	Spin bowler	375,000	Paarl Royals	
David Bedingham	South Africa	Batsman	325,000	Durban's Super Giants	
Marques Ackerman	South Africa	Batsman	200,000	Durban's Super Giants	
Eathan Bosch	South Africa	Fast bowler	1,750,000	Durban's Super Giants	
Reeza Hendricks	South Africa	Batsman	500,000	MI Cape Town	
Dwaine Pretorius	South Africa	Fast bowler	650,000	MI Cape Town	
Delano Potgieter	South Africa	All-rounder	2,600,000	Paarl Royals	
Patrick Kruger	South Africa	All-rounder	450,000	Sunrisers Eastern Cape	
Andile Simelane	South Africa	All-rounder	200,000	Durban's Super Giants	
Dan Worrall	Australia	Fast bowler	1,500,000	Joburg Super Kings	
Craig Overton	England	All-rounder	1,000,000	Pretoria Capitals	
Saqib Mahmood	England	Fast bowler	1,500,000	Pretoria Capitals	
Lutho Sipamla	South Africa	Fast bowler	600,000	Sunrisers Eastern Cape	
Tristan Luus	South Africa	Fast bowler	650,000	MI Cape Town	
Codi Yusuf	South Africa	Fast bowler	225,000	Pretoria Capitals	
Connor Esterhuizen	South Africa	Batsman	3,200,000	Pretoria Capitals	
Kyle Verreynne	South Africa	Wicket keeper	2,300,000	Paarl Royals	
Prenelan Subrayen	South Africa	Spin bowler	1,000,000	Joburg Super Kings	
Tony de Zorzi	South Africa	Batsman	200,000	Durban's Super Giants	
Mitchell Van Buuren	South Africa	Batsman	200,000	Sunrisers Eastern Cape	
Jordan Hermann	South Africa	Batsman	1,500,000	Sunrisers Eastern Cape	RTM from Pretoria Capitals
Dayyaan Galiem	South Africa	All-rounder	200,000	Durban's Super Giants	
Jason Smith	South Africa	Batsman	500,000	MI Cape Town	
Bryce Parsons	South Africa	All-rounder	1,900,000	Pretoria Capitals	
Beyers Swanepoel	South Africa	All-rounder	200,000	Sunrisers Eastern Cape	
Dian Forrester	South Africa	All-rounder	200,000	Joburg Super Kings	
Gideon Peters	South Africa	Fast bowler	400,000	Pretoria Capitals	RTM from Paarl Royals
Keagan Lion-Cachet	South Africa	Wicket keeper	950,000	Paarl Royals	
Tom Moores	England	Wicket keeper	200,000	MI Cape Town	
Junaid Dawood	South Africa	Spin bowler	200,000	Pretoria Capitals	
Dane Piedt	South Africa	Spin bowler	200,000	MI Cape Town	
Taijul Islam	Bangladesh	Fast bowler	500,000	Durban's Super Giants	
Will Smeed	England	Batsman	200,000	Pretoria Capitals	
Asa Tribe	England	Batsman	200,000	Paarl Royals	
Chris Wood	England	Fast bowler	500,000	Sunrisers Eastern Cape	
James Coles	England	All-rounder	1,000,000	Sunrisers Eastern Cape	
Lewis Gregory	England	All-rounder	1,000,000	Sunrisers Eastern Cape	
Steve Stolk	South Africa	Batsman	200,000	Joburg Super Kings	
Hardus Viljoen	South Africa	All-rounder	200,000	Paarl Royals	
Evan Jones	South Africa	Batsman	200,000	Durban's Super Giants	
Meeka-Eel Prince	South Africa	Wicket keeper	200,000	Pretoria Capitals	
Janco Smit	South Africa	Fast bowler	200,000	Joburg Super Kings	
Bayanda Majola	South Africa	Fast bowler	200,000	Pretoria Capitals	
Jacob Johannes Basson	South Africa	All-rounder	200,000	Pretoria Capitals	
Gysbert Wege	South Africa	Batsman	200,000	Durban's Super Giants	
Neil Timmers	South Africa	Wicket keeper	200,000	Joburg Super Kings	
CJ King	South Africa	Fast bowler	200,000	Sunrisers Eastern Cape	
JP King	South Africa	All-rounder	200,000	Sunrisers Eastern Cape	
Wihaan Lubbe	South Africa	Batsman	200,000	Pretoria Capitals	
Tiaan van Vuuren	South Africa	All-rounder	1,000,000	MI Cape Town	
Dan Lategan	South Africa	Batsman	400,000	MI Cape Town	
Shubham Ranjane	United States	All-rounder	200,000	Joburg Super Kings	
Brandon King	West Indies	Batsman	200,000	Joburg Super Kings	
Rilee Rossouw	South Africa	Batsman	500,000	Joburg Super Kings	
Rivaldo Moonsamy	South Africa	Batsman	400,000	Joburg Super Kings	
Dan Lawrence	England	Batsman	500,000	Paarl Royals	
Tabraiz Shamsi	South Africa	Spin bowler	500,000	MI Cape Town	
David Wiese	Namibia	All-rounder	1,300,000	Durban's Super Giants	
Sibonelo Makhanya	South Africa	Batsman	200,000	Pretoria Capitals	
Karim Janat	Afghanistan	All-rounder	1,000,000	MI Cape Town	
Jacques Snyman	South Africa	All-rounder	200,000	MI Cape Town	
Daryn Dupavillon	South Africa	Fast bowler	200,000	Durban's Super Giants	
Eshan Malinga	Sri Lanka	Fast bowler	1,000,000	Paarl Royals	
Imran Tahir	South Africa	Spin bowler	600,000	Joburg Super Kings	
Reece Topley	England	Fast bowler	1,000,000	Joburg Super Kings	
Nqobani Mokoena	South Africa	Fast bowler	200,000	Paarl Royals	
Vishen Halambage	Sri Lanka	All-rounder	200,000	Paarl Royals	
Nqaba Peter	South Africa	Spin bowler	500,000	Paarl Royals	

== Wildcard picks ==
- Durban's Super Giants: Heinrich Klaasen
- Joburg Super Kings: Donovan Ferreira
- MI Cape Town: Kagiso Rabada
- Paarl Royals: Rubin Hermann
- Pretoria Capitals: Andre Russell
- Sunrisers Eastern Cape: Marco Jansen
