= 2025 SA20 final =

Final match of SA20 2025

- Event: 2025 SA20
MI Cape Town	Sunrisers Eastern Cape
181/8	105/10
20 overs	18.4 overs
- MI Cape Town won by 76 runs
- Date: 8 February 2023
- Venue: Wanderers Stadium, Johannesburg
- Player of the match: Trent Boult (MICT)
- Umpires: Lubabalo Gcuma (SA); Allahudien Paleker (SA)

The 2025 SA20 final was a Twenty20 (T20) cricket match played at the Wanderers Stadium, Johannesburg, on 8 February 2025 to determine the winner of the 2025 SA20.

After winning the toss, MI Cape Town elected to bat, and scored 181/8 in 20 overs against Sunrisers Eastern Cape. The MI Cape Town' ultimately win by huge margin of 76 runs, securing their first SA20 title. MICT player Trent Boult was named player of the match.

== Background ==
On 2 September 2024, the CSA announced the schedule for the 2025 season of the SA20. 6 venues were scheduled to host the group stage. St George's Park Cricket Ground was chosen to host qualifier 1 and Centurion Park in Centurion were chosen to host eliminator and qualifier 2 whereas the Wanderers Stadium was chosen to host Grand finale. MI Cape Town and Sunrisers Eastern Cape played the final on 8 February 2025. The MI Cape Town won the match by 76 runs.

== Road to the final ==
MI Cape Town
vs
Sunrisers Eastern Cape
League stage
Opponent
Scorecard
Result
Points
Match No.
Opponent
Scorecard
Result
Points
Sunrisers Eastern Cape
9 January 2025
Won
5
1
MI Cape Town
9 January 2025
Lost
0
Joburg Super Kings
11 January 2025
Lost
5
2
Paarl Royals
11 January 2025
Lost
0
Paarl Royals
13 January 2025
Won
9
3
Pretoria Capitals
14 January 2025
Lost
0
Paarl Royals
15 January 2025
Lost
9
4
Durban's Super Giants
17 January 2025
Won
5
Joburg Super Kings
18 January 2025
Won
14
5
Durban's Super Giants
19 January 2025
Won
10
Durban's Super Giants
21 January 2025
NR
16
6
Pretoria Capitals
22 January 2025
Won
15
Durban's Super Giants
25 January 2025
Won
21
7
Joburg Super Kings
24 January 2025
Won
19
Sunrisers Eastern Cape
29 January 2025
Won
26
8
Joburg Super Kings
26 January 2025
Lost
19
Pretoria Capitals
4 February 2025
Won
30
9
MI Cape Town
29 January 2025
Lost
19
Pretoria Capitals
2 February 2025
Won
35
10
Paarl Royals
1 February 2025
Won
24
Playoff stage

Qualifier 1
4 February 2025 — Gqeberha
1	MI Cape Town	199/4 (20 overs)
2	Paarl Royals	160 (19.4 overs)
Eliminator
5 February 2025 — Centurion
3	Sunrisers Eastern Cape	184/6 (20 overs)
4	Joburg Super Kings	152/7 (20 overs)

Qualifier 2
6 February 2025 — Centurion
Q1L	Paarl Royals	175/4 (20 overs)
EW	Sunrisers Eastern Cape	177/2 (19.2 overs)

The Final
8 February 2025 — Johannesburg
Q1W	MI Cape Town	181/8 (20 overs)
Q2W	Sunrisers Eastern Cape	105 (18.4 overs)

Opponent
Scorecard
Result

Opponent
Scorecard
Result
Paarl Royals
4 February 2025
Won
Q1/E
Joburg Super Kings
5 February 2025
Won
Qualified for the finals
Q2
Paarl Royals
6 February 2025
Won
2025 SA20 final

Source: ESPNcricinfo

== Match ==
=== Match officials ===
- On-field umpires: Allahudien Paleker (SA) and Lubabalo Gcuma (SA)
- Third umpire: Marais Erasmus (SA)
- Reserve umpire: Stephen Harris (SA)
- Match referee: Gerrie Pienaar (SA)
- Toss: MI Cape Town won the toss and elected to bat.

=== Summary ===
Final
8 February 2025
17:30 (D/N)
Scorecard

MI Cape Town; 181/8 (20 overs)	v	Sunrisers Eastern Cape; 105 (18.4 overs)
Connor Esterhuizen 39 (26); Richard Gleeson 2/22 (4 overs)		Tom Abell 30 (25); Kagiso Rabada 4/25 (3.4 overs)

MI Cape Town won by 76 runs
Wanderers Stadium, Johannesburg
Umpires: Lubabalo Gcuma (SA) and Allahudien Paleker (SA)
Player of the match: Trent Boult (MI Cape Town)

- MI Cape Town won the toss and elected to bat.

=== MI Cape Town innings ===
MI Cape Town (MICT) won the toss and elected to BAT. They had early good start. Both opening batters, Rassie van der Dussen and Ryan Rickelton smashed bolwer till first 5 overs. Ryan Rickelton was the first to fall, dismissed by English spin bowler Liam Dawson for 33 runs off 15 balls in the fifth over. As, Reeza Hendricks joined Rassie van der Dussen in the middle he was dismissed on duck by Richard Gleeson on the very second delivery. Later, Connor Esterhuizen and van der Dussen tried to stabilize the innings but van der Dussen was dismissed by Craig Overton on 23. This brought George Linde to the crease, alongside Esterhuizen but Linde's innings was cut short when he got dismissed by Dawson on 20 leaving them on 93 off 4. Dewald Brevis and Connor Esterhuizen quickly spearheaded the innings and made 38 and 39 respectively but were dismissed early by Marco Jansen and skipper Aiden Markram respectively. Delano Potgieter came to the crease and tried to took the innings forward, but back to back 2 wickets fell down, as skipper Rashid Khan and South African cricketer Corbin Bosch got out on golden duck to Gleeson and Jansen respectively. Delano Potgieter and Kagiso Rabada contributed 13 runs off 12 balls and 8 runs off 5 balls remaining not out respectively and thus, taking the total score tally to 181 off 9.

Marco Jansen, Richard Gleeson and Liam Dawson got 2 wickets each while Craig Overton and Aiden Markram got 1 wicket each for 31 runs and 35 runs respectively. Andile Simelane unabled to picke up a wicket, conceding 14 runs. MICT's innings included 7 extras, with their overall run rate of 9.05 at the end.

=== Sunrisers Eastern Cape innings ===
Sunrisers Eastern Cape (SEC) didn't have a good start to the chase. Of the two openers, David Bedingham got dismissed by Kagiso Rabada on the last ball of the second over for just 5 runs. South African batter Jordan Hermann joined the crease and soon followed, dismissed for just 1 run off pacer Trent Boult's bowling. English batter Tom Abell and South African cricketer Tony de Zorzi stabilizes the innings and made 30 and 26 respectively before being dismissed by Linde and Rashid Khan respectively. As skipper Aiden Markram joined the crease along with middle order batsman Tristan Stubbs but Markram's innings was cut short when he got dismissed cheaply by Linde. Stubbs followed soon after, dismissed for 15 runs off Boult bowling. Later Liam Dawson and Craig Overton were also dismissed cheaply by Rabada and Bosch respectively. At last Andile Simelane and Richard Gleeson tried to stay on crease but Rabada took Gleeson wicket and Simelane remains not out and the total team tally of 105 off 10.

MICT's bowling attack was led by Kagiso Rabada, who claimed 4 wickets for 25 runs. Both Trent Boult and George Linde took 2 wickets for 9 runs and 20 runs respectively. Rashid Khan took 1 wicket for just 19 runs, while Corbin Bosch matched Markram with 1 wickets for 27 runs.

MICT ended with a decisive victory by 76 runs securing their first SA20 title.

=== Scorecard ===
Source: ESPNcricinfo

1st innings

MI Cape Town innings
Player	Status	Runs	Balls	4s	6s	Strike rate
Rassie van der Dussen	st †Stubbs b Dawson	23	25	0	2	92.00
Ryan Rickelton	c Dawson b Overton	33	15	1	4	220.00
Reeza Hendricks	c Simelane b Gleeson	0	2	0	0	0.00
Connor Esterhuizen	c Jansen b Markram	39	26	2	2	150.00
George Linde	c Overton b Dawson	20	14	0	3	142.85
Dewald Brevis	c Markram b Jansen	38	18	2	4	211.11
Delano Potgieter	not out	13	12	2	0	108.33
Rashid Khan	c Abell b Gleeson	0	2	0	0	0.00
Corbin Bosch	c †Stubbs b Jansen	0	2	0	0	0.00
Kagiso Rabada	not out	8	5	1	0	160.00
Trent Boult	not out					
Extras 7 (nb 1, w 6); Total 181/8 (20 overs)				8	15	9.05 RR

Fall of wickets: 51-1 (Ryan Rickelton, 4.6 ov), 52-2 (Reeza Hendricks, 5.5 ov), 67-3 (Rassie van der Dussen, 8.1 ov), 93-4 (George Linde, 10.6 ov), 143-5 (Dewald Brevis, 15.5 ov), 161-6 (Connor Esterhuizen, 16.5 ov), 167-7 (Rashid Khan, 17.5 ov), 168-8 (Corbin Bosch, 18.2 ov)

Sunrisers Eastern Cape bowling
Bowler	Overs	Maidens	Runs	Wickets	Econ	Wides	NBs
Craig Overton	4	0	31	1	7.75	0	0
Marco Jansen	4	0	39	2	9.75	0	0
Richard Gleeson	4	0	22	2	5.50	0	0
Liam Dawson	4	0	40	2	10.00	0	0
Aiden Markram	3	0	35	1	11.66	2	0
Andile Simelane	1	0	14	0	14.00	0	1

2nd innings

Sunrisers Eastern Cape innings
Player	Status	Runs	Balls	4s	6s	Strike rate
David Bedingham	c Linde b Rabada	5	8	1	0	62.50
Tony de Zorzi	lbw b Rashid Khan	26	23	3	1	113.04
Jordan Hermann	c †Rickelton b Boult	1	5	0	0	20.00
Tom Abell	st †Rickelton b Linde	30	25	4	1	120.00
Aiden Markram	c Rabada b Linde	6	5	0	0	120.00
Tristan Stubbs	c Rashid Khan b Boult	15	15	0	0	100.00
Marco Jansen	c Rashid Khan b Rabada	5	11	0	0	45.45
Andile Simelane	not out	5	10	0	0	50.00
Liam Dawson	c Esterhuizen b Rabada	4	2	1	0	200.00
Craig Overton	c Rashid Khan b Bosch	1	2	0	0	50.00
Richard Gleeson	c Rashid Khan b Bosch	1	6	0	0	16.66
Extras 6 (lb 5, w 1); Total 105/10 (18.4 overs)				9	2	5.62 RR

Fall of wickets: 7-1 (David Bedingham, 1.5 ov), 8-2 (Jordan Hermann, 2.4 ov), 65-3 (Tom Abell, 9.4 ov), 68-4 (Tony de Zorzi, 10.3 ov), 74-5 (Aiden Markram, 11.2 ov), 92-6 (Tristan Stubbs, 14.5 ov), 97-7 (Marco Jansen, 16.3 ov), 101-8 (Liam Dawson, 16.5 ov), 102-9 (Craig Overton, 17.1 ov), 105-10 (Richard Gleeson, 18.4 ov)

MI Cape Town bowling
Bowler	Overs	Maidens	Runs	Wickets	Econ	Wides	NBs
Trent Boult	4	0	9	2	2.25	0	0
Kagiso Rabada	3.4	0	25	4	6.81	0	0
Corbin Bosch	3	0	27	1	9.00	0	1
Rashid Khan	4	0	19	0	4.75	0	0
George Linde	4	0	20	2	5.00	1	0
