= 2025 SA20 =

3rd season of the South African T20 League

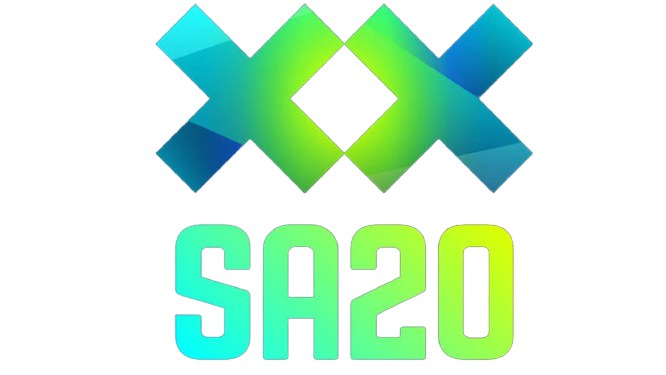
- Dates: 9 January – 8 February 2025
- Administrator: Cricket South Africa
- Cricket format: Twenty20
- Tournament format(s): Double round-robin and playoffs
- Champions: MI Cape Town (1st title)
- Runners-up: Sunrisers Eastern Cape
- Participants: 6
- Matches: 34
- Player of the series: Marco Jansen (Sunrisers Eastern Cape)
- Most runs: Lhuan-dre Pretorius (397) (Paarl Royals)
- Most wickets: Marco Jansen (19) (Sunrisers Eastern Cape)
- Official website: SA20

The 2025 SA20 or SA20 Season 3 (also known as Betway SA20 2025 for sponsorship reasons) was the third season of the SA20, a franchise Twenty20 cricket league in South Africa. The competition was organized by Cricket South Africa, featuring six teams. The tournament begun on 9 January, with the final held on 8 February 2025 at Wanderers Stadium in Johannesburg.

Sunrisers Eastern Cape were the defending champions with 2 titles to their name. In the final, MI Cape Town defeated Sunrisers Eastern Cape by 76 runs to win their maiden title.

With an average of 25,436, the Joburg Super Kings drew the highest average home attendance in the 2025 SA20. The season was marked by many packed stadiums, with the league seeing a 70% increase in sold-out games and a sold-out final for the third year running, making this the most-attended SA20 season to date.

== Background ==
In June 2024, it was announced that SA20 would return for a third season in 2025. The league is sponsored by Betway.

The 2025 season clashed with the Big Bash League, Super Smash, Bangladesh Premier League and ILT20.

== Squads ==
The player auction took place on 1 October 2024.

Durban's Super Giants	Joburg Super Kings	MI Cape Town	Paarl Royals	Pretoria Capitals	Sunrisers Eastern Cape
Keshav Maharaj (c); Noor Ahmad (AFG); Matthew Breetzke; Junior Dala; Quinton de Kock; Shamar Joseph (WI); Brandon King (WI); Heinrich Klaasen; Wiaan Mulder; Naveen-ul-Haq (AFG); Bryce Parsons; Dwaine Pretorius; Jason Smith; JJ Smuts; Marcus Stoinis (AUS); Prenelan Subrayen; Kane Williamson (NZ); Chris Woakes (ENG); CJ King (WI)	Faf du Plessis (c); Moeen Ali (ENG); Jonny Bairstow (ENG); Doug Bracewell (NZ); Beuran Hendricks; Gerald Coetzee; Devon Conway (NZ); Leus du Plooy (ENG); Donovan Ferreira; Evan Jones (ENG); Wihan Lubbe; Sibonelo Makhanya; Tabraiz Shamsi; Imran Tahir (PAK); Maheesh Theekshana (SL); David Wiese (NAM); Hardus Viljoen; JP King (ENG); Matheesha Pathirana (SL)	Rashid Khan (c) (AFG); Chris Benjamin; Trent Boult (NZ); Dewald Brevis; Connor Esterhuizen; Reeza Hendricks; Colin Ingram; Thomas Kaber; George Linde; Azmatullah Omarzai (AFG); Dane Piedt; Delano Potgieter; Kagiso Rabada; Ryan Rickelton; ~~Ben Stokes~~ (ENG); Nuwan Thushara (SL); Rassie van der Dussen; Tristan Luus; Corbin Bosch; Matthew Potts (ENG)	David Miller (c); Bjorn Fortuin; Dayyaan Galiem; Sam Hain (ENG); Rubin Hermann; Dinesh Karthik (IND); Kwena Maphaka; Lungi Ngidi; Nqaba Peter; Andile Phehlukwayo; Lhuan-dre Pretorius; Joe Root (ENG); Eshan Malinga (SL); Mujeeb Ur Rahman (AFG); Mitchell van Buuren; Codi Yusuf; Dewan Marais; Dunith Wellalage (SL)	Rilee Rossouw (c); Marques Ackerman; Eathan Bosch; Daryn Dupavillon; Rahmanullah Gurbaz (AFG); Will Jacks (ENG); Evin Lewis (WI); Senuran Muthusamy; James Neesham (NZ); Anrich Nortje; Migael Pretorius; Wayne Parnell; Kyle Simmonds (WI); Will Smeed (ENG); Steve Stolk; Tiaan van Vuuren; Kyle Verreynne; Keagan Lion-Cachet; Liam Livingstone (ENG)	Aiden Markram (c); Tom Abell (ENG); Ottniel Baartman; Okuhle Cele; Zak Crawley (ENG); Liam Dawson (ENG); Richard Gleeson (ENG); Simon Harmer; Jordan Hermann; Marco Jansen; Patrick Kruger; Craig Overton (ENG); Caleb Seleka; Andile Simelane; Tristan Stubbs; Beyers Swanepoel; Roelof van der Merwe (NED); Daniel Smith (ENG); David Bedingham (ENG)

== Venues ==
2025 SA20 (South Africa)

Cape Town	Centurion	Durban
MI Cape Town	Pretoria Capitals	Durban's Super Giants
Newlands Cricket Ground	Centurion Park	Kingsmead Cricket Ground
Capacity: 25,000	Capacity: 22,000	Capacity: 25,000
Gqeberha	Johannesburg	Paarl
Sunrisers Eastern Cape	Joburg Super Kings	Paarl Royals
St George's Park Cricket Ground	Wanderers Stadium	Boland Park
Capacity: 19,000	Capacity: 34,000	Capacity: 10,000

== Teams and standings ==
=== Points table ===
Pos	Team	Pld	W	L	NR	BP	Pts	NRR	Qualification
1	MI Cape Town (C)	10	7	2	1	5	35	2.446	Advance to Qualifier 1
2	Paarl Royals	10	7	3	0	0	28	−0.125	Advance to Qualifier 1
3	Sunrisers Eastern Cape (R)	10	5	5	0	4	24	−0.206	Advance to Eliminator
4	Joburg Super Kings	10	4	5	1	1	19	−0.208	Advance to Eliminator
5	Pretoria Capitals	10	2	6	2	2	14	−0.585	
6	Durban's Super Giants	10	2	6	2	0	12	−1.256	

Source: ESPNcricinfo
(C) Champions; (R) Runners-up
- Points – Win 4, No Result 2. One additional point is awarded for a win when the run rate difference is 1.25 greater than the opposing side's.

=== Win-loss table ===
Below is a summary of results for each team's ten regular season matches, plus finals where applicable, in chronological order. A team's opponent for any given match is listed above the margin of victory/defeat.

Team	League stage										Play-offs				Pos.
Team	1	2	3	4	5	6	7	8	9	10	Q1	E	Q2	F	Pos.
Durban's Super Giants (DSG)	PC; 2 runs	PC; N/R	JSK; 28 runs	SEC; 58 runs	SEC; 6 wickets	MICT; N/R	PR; 5 wickets	MICT; 7 wickets	PR; 6 wickets	JSK; 11 runs (DLS)	X	X	X	X	6th
Joburg Super Kings (JSK)	MICT; 6 runs (DLS)	DSG; 28 runs	PC; N/R	MICT; 7 wickets	PR; 6 wickets	SEC; 14 runs	SEC; 9 wickets	PC; 6 wickets	PR; 7 wickets	DSG; 11 runs (DLS)	→	SEC; 32 runs	X	X	4th (E)
MI Cape Town (MICT)	SEC; 97 runs	JSK; 6 runs (DLS)	PR; 33 runs	PR; 6 wickets	JSK; 7 wickets	DSG; N/R	DSG; 7 wickets	SEC; 10 wickets	PC; 27 runs	PC; 95 runs	PR; 39 runs	→	→	SEC; 76 runs	1st (C)
Paarl Royals (PR)	SEC; 9 wickets	MICT; 33 runs	MICT; 6 wickets	PC; 8 wickets	JSK; 6 wickets	DSG; 5 wickets	PC; 11 runs	DSG; 6 wickets	JSK; 7 wickets	SEC; 48 runs	MICT; 39 runs	→	SEC; 8 wickets	X	2nd (Q2)
Pretoria Capitals (PC)	DSG; 2 runs	DSG; N/R	SEC; 6 wickets	JSK; N/R	PR; 8 wickets	SEC; 52 runs	PR; 11 runs	JSK; 6 wickets	MICT; 27 runs	MICT; 95 runs	X	X	X	X	5th
Sunrisers Eastern Cape (SEC)	MICT; 97 runs	PR; 9 wickets	PC; 6 wickets	DSG; 58 runs	DSG; 6 wickets	PC; 52 runs	JSK; 14 runs	JSK; 9 wickets	MICT; 10 wickets	PR; 48 runs	→	JSK; 32 runs	PR; 8 wickets	MICT; 76 runs	3rd (RU)

Team's results→	Won	Lost	N/R

=== Match summary ===
Visitor team →	DSG	JSK	MICT	PR	PC	SEC
Home team ↓	DSG	JSK	MICT	PR	PC	SEC
Durban's Super Giants		Johannesburg; 28 runs	Match abandoned	Paarl; 5 wickets	Durban; 2 runs	Eastern Cape; 58 runs
Joburg Super Kings	Durban; 11 runs (D/L)		Johannesburg; 6 runs (D/L)	Johannesburg; 7 wickets	Match abandoned	Johannesburg; 9 wickets
MI Cape Town	Cape Town; 7 wickets	Cape Town; 7 wickets		Cape Town; 33 runs	Cape Town; 95 runs	Cape Town; 10 wickets
Paarl Royals	Paarl; 6 wickets	Paarl; 6 wickets	Paarl; 6 wickets		Paarl; 11 runs	Paarl; 9 wickets
Pretoria Capitals	Match abandoned	Pretoria; 6 wickets	Cape Town; 27 runs	Paarl; 8 wickets		Pretoria; 6 wickets
Sunrisers Eastern Cape	Eastern Cape; 6 wickets	Eastern Cape; 14 runs	Cape Town; 97 runs	Eastern Cape; 48 runs	Eastern Cape; 52 runs	

Home team won	Visitor team won

- Note: Results listed are according to the home (horizontal) and visitor (vertical) teams.
- Note: Click on a result to see a summary of the match.

== League stage ==
The full fixture list was released on 2 September 2024.

Match 1
9 January 2025
17:30 (D/N)
Scorecard

MI Cape Town; 174/7 (20 overs)	v	Sunrisers Eastern Cape; 77 (15 overs)
Dewald Brevis 57 (29); Richard Gleeson 2/22 (4 overs)		Aiden Markram 19 (19); Delano Potgieter 5/10 (3 overs)

MI Cape Town won by 97 runs
St George's Park Cricket Ground, Gqeberha
Umpires: Marais Erasmus (SA) and Allahuddien Paleker (SA)
Player of the match: Delano Potgieter (MI Cape Town)

- Sunrisers Eastern Cape won the toss and elected to field.
- MI Cape Town were awarded a bonus point for a win with a run rate difference greater than 1.25.

Match 2
10 January 2025
17:30 (D/N)
Scorecard

Durban's Super Giants; 209/4 (20 overs)	v	Pretoria Capitals; 207/6 (20 overs)
Kane Williamson 60* (40); Senuran Muthusamy 3/21 (4 overs)		Rahmanullah Gurbaz 89 (43); Noor Ahmad 2/34 (4 overs)

Durban's Super Giants won by 2 runs
Kingsmead Cricket Ground, Durban
Umpires: Lubabalo Gcuma (SA) and Bongani Jele (SA)
Player of the match: Rahmanullah Gurbaz (Pretoria Capitals)

- Durban's Super Giants won the toss and elected to bat.

Match 3
11 January 2025
13:00
Scorecard

Sunrisers Eastern Cape; 175/5 (20 overs)	v	Paarl Royals; 176/1 (18.4 overs)
Aiden Markram 82 (49); Mujeeb Ur Rahman 2/27 (4 overs)		Lhuan-dre Pretorius 97 (51); Marco Jansen 1/31 (4 overs)

Paarl Royals won by 9 wickets
Boland Park, Paarl
Umpires: Lauren Agenbag (SA) and Stephen Harris (SA)
Player of the match: Lhuan-dre Pretorius (Paarl Royals)

- Sunrisers Eastern Cape won the toss and elected to bat.

Match 4
11 January 2025
17:30 (D/N)
Scorecard

MI Cape Town; 140/6 (20 overs)	v	Joburg Super Kings; 82/3 (11.3 overs)
George Linde 48* (35); David Wiese 1/19 (4 overs)		Faf du Plessis 30 (23); Kagiso Rabada 2/10 (2.3 overs)

Joburg Super Kings won by 6 runs (DLS Method)
Wanderers Stadium, Johannesburg
Umpires: Bongani Jele (SA) and Marais Erasmus (SA)
Player of the match: Faf du Plessis (Joburg Super Kings)

- Joburg Super Kings won the toss and elected to field.
- Rain prevented any further play.
- Joburg Super Kings were 6 runs ahead of the DLS par score of 77 runs.

Match 5
12 January 2025
15:30
Scorecard

Pretoria Capitals	v	Durban's Super Giants

Match abandoned
Centurion Park, Centurion
Umpires: Lubabalo Gcuma (SA) and Marais Erasmus (SA)

- Durban's Super Giants won the toss and elected to field.
- No play was possible due to rain.

Match 6
13 January 2025
17:30 (D/N)
Scorecard

MI Cape Town; 172/7 (20 overs)	v	Paarl Royals; 139/9 (20 overs)
Reeza Hendricks 59 (37); Dayyaan Galiem 3/24 (4 overs)		Mujeeb Ur Rahman 34 (21); George Linde 3/15 (4 overs)

MI Cape Town won by 33 runs
Newlands Cricket Ground, Cape Town
Umpires: Lauren Agenbag (SA) and Arno Jacobs (SA)
Player of the match: Kagiso Rabada (MI Cape Town)

- MI Cape Town won the toss and elected to bat.

Match 7
14 January 2025
13:00
Scorecard

Sunrisers Eastern Cape; 113 (19.4 overs)	v	Pretoria Capitals; 115/4 (16 overs)
Marco Jansen 51 (35); Daryn Dupavillon 3/32 (4 overs)		Marques Ackerman 39* (30); Richard Gleeson 2/31 (3 overs)

Pretoria Capitals won by 6 wickets
Centurion Park, Centurion
Umpires: Dennis Smith (SA) and Siphelele Gasa (SA)
Player of the match: Eathan Bosch (Pretoria Capitals)

- Pretoria Capitals won the toss and elected to field.
- Pretoria Capitals were awarded a bonus point for a win with a run rate difference less than 1.25.

Match 8
14 January 2025
17:30 (D/N)
Scorecard

Joburg Super Kings; 169/7 (20 overs)	v	Durban's Super Giants; 141 (18 overs)
Leus du Plooy 38 (32); Prenelan Subrayen 2/24 (4 overs)		Quinton de Kock 55 (45); Donovan Ferreira 2/15 (4 overs)

Joburg Super Kings won by 28 runs
Kingsmead Cricket Ground, Durban
Umpires: Abdoellah Steenkamp (SA) and Brad White (SA)
Player of the match: Quinton de Kock (Durban's Super Giants)

- Joburg Super Kings won the toss and elected to bat.

Match 9
15 January 2025
17:30 (D/N)
Scorecard

MI Cape Town; 158/4 (20 overs)	v	Paarl Royals; 159/4 (19 overs)
Rassie van der Dussen 91* (64); Mujeeb Ur Rahman 2/27 (4 overs)		Lhuan-dre Pretorius 83 (52); Rashid Khan 1/22 (4 overs)

Paarl Royals won by 6 wickets
Boland Park, Paarl
Umpires: Thomas Mokorosi (SA) and Allahuddien Paleker (SA)
Player of the match: Lhuan-dre Pretorius (Paarl Royals)

- Paarl Royals won the toss and elected to field.

Match 10
16 January 2025
17:30 (D/N)
Scorecard

Pretoria Capitals; 138/8 (20 overs)	v	Joburg Super Kings
Kyle Verreynne 39 (31); Donovan Ferreira 2/17 (3 overs)

No result
Wanderers Stadium, Johannesburg
Umpires: Lubabalo Gcuma (SA) and Bongani Jele (SA)

- Joburg Super Kings won the toss and elected to field.
- Rain prevented any further play.

Match 11
17 January 2025
17:30 (D/N)
Scorecard

Sunrisers Eastern Cape; 165/5 (20 overs)	v	Durban's Super Giants; 107 (18.1 overs)
Tom Abell 57 (39); Noor Ahmad 4/25 (4 overs)		Bryce Parsons 23 (21); Richard Gleeson 2/12 (3 overs)

Sunrisers Eastern Cape won by 58 runs
Kingsmead Cricket Ground, Durban
Umpires: Marais Erasmus (SA) and Dennis Smith (SA)
Player of the match: Noor Ahmad (Durban's Super Giants)

- Sunrisers Eastern Cape won the toss and elected to bat.

Match 12
18 January 2025
13:00
Scorecard

Pretoria Capitals; 212/5 (20 overs)	v	Paarl Royals; 213/2 (19.4 overs)
Will Smeed 54 (34); Mujeeb Ur Rahman 2/28 (4 overs)		Joe Root 92* (60); Will Jacks 1/33 (4 overs)

Paarl Royals won by 8 wickets
Centurion Park, Centurion
Umpires: Stephen Harris (SA) and James Middlebrook (Eng)
Player of the match: Joe Root (Paarl Royals)

- Pretoria Capitals won the toss and elected to bat.
- David Miller (Paarl Royals) scored his 11,000th run in T20s.

Match 13
18 January 2025
17:30 (D/N)
Scorecard

Joburg Super Kings; 172/5 (20 overs)	v	MI Cape Town; 173/3 (15.5 overs)
Faf du Plessis 61 (38); Reeza Hendricks 2/7 (2 overs)		Ryan Rickelton 89 (39); David Wiese 1/20 (2.5 overs)

MI Cape Town won by 7 wickets
Newlands Cricket Ground, Cape Town
Umpires: Arno Jacobs (SA) and Allahuddien Paleker (SA)
Player of the match: Ryan Rickelton (MI Cape Town)

- Joburg Super Kings won the toss and elected to bat.
- MI Cape Town were awarded a bonus point for a win with a run rate difference greater than 1.25.

Match 14
19 January 2025
15:30
Scorecard

Durban's Super Giants; 115/8 (20 overs)	v	Sunrisers Eastern Cape; 117/4 (15.2 overs)
Kane Williamson 44 (45); Liam Dawson 2/11 (4 overs)		David Bedingham 39 (20); Keshav Maharaj 2/18 (4 overs)

Sunrisers Eastern Cape won by 6 wickets
St George's Park Cricket Ground, Gqeberha
Umpires: Stephen Harris (SA) and Phillip Vosloo (SA)
Player of the match: Marco Jansen (Sunrisers Eastern Cape)

- Durban's Super Giants won the toss and elected to bat.
- Sunrisers Eastern Cape were awarded a bonus point for a win with a run rate difference greater than 1.25.

Match 15
20 January 2025
17:30 (D/N)
Scorecard

Joburg Super Kings; 146/6 (20 overs)	v	Paarl Royals; 150/4 (19.1 overs)
Jonny Bairstow 60 (40); Bjorn Fortuin 2/22 (4 overs)		Mitchell Van Buuren 44 (45); Hardus Viljoen 2/23 (4 overs)

Paarl Royals won by 6 wickets
Boland Park, Paarl
Umpires: Arno Jacobs (SA) and Dennis Smith (SA)
Player of the match: Jonny Bairstow (Joburg Super Kings)

- Paarl Royals won the toss and elected to field.

Match 16
21 January 2025
17:30 (D/N)
Scorecard

MI Cape Town; 69/3 (11 overs)	v	Durban's Super Giants
Rassie van der Dussen 35* (32); Noor Ahmad 1/7 (2 overs)

No result
Kingsmead Cricket Ground, Durban
Umpires: James Middlebrook (Eng) and Allahudien Paleker (SA)

- Durban's Super Giants won the toss and elected to field.
- Rain prevented any further play.

Match 17
22 January 2025
17:30 (D/N)
Scorecard

Sunrisers Eastern Cape; 149/7 (20 overs)	v	Pretoria Capitals; 97 (16.3 overs)
Aiden Markram 68* (55); Eathan Bosch 3/33 (4 overs)		Keagan Lion-Cachet 28 (27); Marco Jansen 4/13 (4 overs)

Sunrisers Eastern Cape won by 52 runs
St George's Park Cricket Ground, Gqeberha
Umpires: Bongani Jele (SA) and Brad White (SA)
Player of the match: Aiden Markram (Sunrisers Eastern Cape)

- Pretoria Capitals won the toss and elected to field.
- Sunrisers Eastern Cape were awarded a bonus point for a win with a run rate difference greater than 1.25.

Match 18
23 January 2025
17:30 (D/N)
Scorecard

Durban's Super Giants; 142/7 (20 overs)	v	Paarl Royals; 146/5 (17.3 overs)
Quinton de Kock 43 (30); Mujeeb Ur Rahman 2/23 (4 overs)		Rubin Hermann 44 (22); Junior Dala 2/38 (4 overs)

Paarl Royals won by 5 wickets
Kingsmead Cricket Ground, Durban
Umpires: Lubabalo Gcuma (SA) and Phillip Vosloo (SA)
Player of the match: Bjorn Fortuin (Paarl Royals)

- Durban's Super Giants won the toss and elected to bat.

Match 19
24 January 2025
17:30 (D/N)
Scorecard

Sunrisers Eastern Cape; 165/4 (20 overs)	v	Joburg Super Kings; 151/8 (20 overs)
Aiden Markram 43 (39); Evan Jones 2/38 (4 overs)		Devon Conway 43 (40); Marco Jansen 2/19 (4 overs)

Sunrisers Eastern Cape won by 14 runs
St George's Park Cricket Ground, Gqeberha
Umpires: Mazizi Gampu (SA) and Abdoellah Steenkamp (SA)
Player of the match: Marco Jansen (Sunrisers Eastern Cape)

- Sunrisers Eastern Cape won the toss and elected to bat.

Match 20
25 January 2025
13:00
Scorecard

Paarl Royals; 140/4 (20 overs)	v	Pretoria Capitals; 129/7 (20 overs)
Joe Root 78* (56); Kyle Simmonds 1/14 (3 overs)		Will Jacks 56 (53); Mujeeb Ur Rahman 2/17 (4 overs)

Paarl Royals won by 11 runs
Boland Park, Paarl
Umpires: Marais Erasmus (SA) and James Middlebrook (Eng)
Player of the match: Joe Root (Paarl Royals)

- Pretoria Capitals won the toss and elected to field.

Match 21
25 January 2025
17:30 (D/N)
Scorecard

Durban's Super Giants; 149/6 (20 overs)	v	MI Cape Town; 154/3 (14.5 overs)
Heinrich Klaasen 66 (43); Rashid Khan 2/34 (4 overs)		Ryan Rickelton 63 (41); Keshav Maharaj 1/23 (4 overs)

MI Cape Town won by 7 wickets
Newlands Cricket Ground, Cape Town
Umpires: Siphelele Gasa (SA) and Stephen Harris (SA)
Player of the match: Heinrich Klaasen (Durban's Super Giants)

- MI Cape Town won the toss and elected to field.
- MI Cape Town were awarded a bonus point for a win with a run rate difference greater than 1.25.

Match 22
26 January 2025
15:30
Scorecard

Sunrisers Eastern Cape; 118 (19 overs)	v	Joburg Super Kings; 119/1 (14 overs)
David Bedingham 48 (40); Hardus Viljoen 4/24 (4 overs)		Devon Conway 76* (56); Beyers Swanepoel 1/24 (3 overs)

Joburg Super Kings won by 9 wickets
Wanderers Stadium, Johannesburg
Umpires: Lubabalo Gcuma (SA) and Brad White (SA)
Player of the match: Lutho Sipamla (Joburg Super Kings)

- Sunrisers Eastern Cape won the toss and elected to bat.
- Joburg Super Kings were awarded a bonus point for a win with a run rate difference greater than 1.25.

Match 23
27 January 2025
17:30 (D/N)
Scorecard

Durban's Super Giants; 143/7 (20 overs)	v	Paarl Royals; 147/4 (19.5 overs)
Marcus Stoinis 55* (40); Bjorn Fortuin 2/20 (4 overs)		Rubin Hermann 59 (51); Marcus Stoinis 1/22 (2.3 overs)

Paarl Royals won by 6 wickets
Boland Park, Paarl
Umpires: Bongani Jele (SA) and Allahudien Paleker (SA)
Player of the match: Rubin Hermann (Paarl Royals)

- Durban's Super Giants won the toss and elected to bat.

Match 24
28 January 2025
17:30 (D/N)
Scorecard

Joburg Super Kings; 99/9 (20 overs)	v	Pretoria Capitals; 100/4 (12 overs)
Jonny Bairstow 30 (32); Migael Pretorius 3/22 (4 overs)		Marques Ackerman 39 (22); Lutho Sipamla 3/26 (4 overs)

Pretoria Capitals won by 6 wickets
Centurion Park, Centurion
Umpires: Lubabalo Gcuma (SA) and Abongile Sodumo (SA)
Player of the match: Migael Pretorius (Pretoria Capitals)

- Pretoria Capitals won the toss and elected to field.
- Pretoria Capitals were awarded a bonus point for a win with a run rate difference greater than 1.25.

Match 25
29 January 2025
17:30 (D/N)
Scorecard

Sunrisers Eastern Cape; 107 (19.2 overs)	v	MI Cape Town; 110/0 (11 overs)
David Bedingham 45 (45); Corbin Bosch 4/19 (3.4 overs)		Ryan Rickelton 59* (36)

MI Cape Town won by 10 wickets
Newlands Cricket Ground, Cape Town
Umpires: Mazizi Gampu (SA) and Arno Jacobs (SA)
Player of the match: Corbin Bosch (MI Cape Town)

- MI Cape Town won the toss and elected to field.
- MI Cape Town were awarded a bonus point for a win with a run rate difference greater than 1.25.

Match 26
30 January 2025
17:30 (D/N)
Scorecard

Paarl Royals; 150/9 (20 overs)	v	Joburg Super Kings; 151/3 (17.5 overs)
Dinesh Karthik 53 (39); Lutho Sipamla 3/19 (4 overs)		Faf du Plessis 87 (55); Mujeeb Ur Rahman 1/20 (3.5 overs)

Joburg Super Kings won by 7 wickets
Wanderers Stadium, Johannesburg
Umpires: Stephen Harris (SA) and Abongile Sodumo (SA)
Player of the match: Faf du Plessis (Joburg Super Kings)

- Joburg Super Kings won the toss and elected to field.

Match 27
31 January 2025
17:30 (D/N)
Scorecard

MI Cape Town; 222/3 (20 overs)	v	Pretoria Capitals; 195/8 (20 overs)
Reeza Hendricks 77* (44); Senuran Muthusamy 1/34 (4 overs)		Will Smeed 52 (36); Rashid Khan 2/25 (4 overs)

MI Cape Town won by 27 runs
Centurion Park, Centurion
Umpires: Arno Jacobs (SA) and Thomas Mokorosi (SA)
Player of the match: Dewald Brevis (MI Cape Town)

- Pretoria Capitals won the toss and elected to field.

Match 28
1 February 2025
13:00
Scorecard

Sunrisers Eastern Cape; 148/8 (20 overs)	v	Paarl Royals; 100 (18.2 overs)
Jordan Hermann 53 (38); Bjorn Fortuin 2/20 (4 overs)		Rubin Hermann 35 (39); Craig Overton 3/15 (4 overs)

Sunrisers Eastern Cape won by 48 runs
St George's Park Cricket Ground, Gqeberha
Umpires: Lubabalo Gcuma (SA) and Allahudien Paleker (SA)
Player of the match: Jordan Hermann (Sunrisers Eastern Cape)

- Sunrisers Eastern Cape won the toss and elected to bat.
- Sunrisers Eastern Cape were awarded a bonus point for a win with a run rate difference greater than 1.25.

Match 29
1 February 2025
17:30 (D/N)
Scorecard

Durban's Super Giants; 173/4 (20 overs)	v	Joburg Super Kings; 135/9 (16 overs)
Heinrich Klaasen 76* (47); Hardus Viljoen 2/42 (4 overs)		Donovan Ferreira 51 (22); Noor Ahmad 3/25 (4 overs)

Durban's Super Giants won by 11 runs (DLS method)
Wanderers Stadium, Johannesburg
Umpires: Stephen Harris (SA) and Arno Jacobs (SA)
Player of the match: Noor Ahmad (Durban's Super Giants)

- Joburg Super Kings won the toss and elected to field.
- Joburg Super Kings were set a revised target of 147 runs from 16 overs due to rain.

Match 30
2 February 2025
15:30
Scorecard

MI Cape Town; 201/5 (20 overs)	v	Pretoria Capitals; 106 (14 overs)
Sediqullah Atal 74 (46); James Neesham 3/32 (4 overs)		James Neesham 32 (24); Thomas Kaber 3/27 (3 overs)

MI Cape Town won by 95 runs
Newlands Cricket Ground, Cape Town
Umpires: Siphelele Gasa (SA) and Abdoellah Steenkamp (SA)
Player of the match: Dane Piedt (MI Cape Town)

- MI Cape Town won the toss and elected to bat.
- MI Cape Town were awarded a bonus point for a win with a run rate difference greater than 1.25.

== Playoffs ==
=== Bracket ===
Qualifier 1
4 February 2025 — Gqeberha
1	MI Cape Town	199/4 (20 overs)
2	Paarl Royals	160 (19.4 overs)
Eliminator
5 February 2025 — Centurion
3	Sunrisers Eastern Cape	184/6 (20 overs)
4	Joburg Super Kings	152/7 (20 overs)

Qualifier 2
6 February 2025 — Centurion
Q1L	Paarl Royals	175/4 (20 overs)
EW	Sunrisers Eastern Cape	177/2 (19.2 overs)

The Final
8 February 2025 — Johannesburg
Q1W	MI Cape Town	181/8 (20 overs)
Q2W	Sunrisers Eastern Cape	105 (18.4 overs)

=== Qualifier 1 ===
Qualifier 1
4 February 2025
17:30 (D/N)
Scorecard

MI Cape Town; 199/4 (20 overs)	v	Paarl Royals; 160 (19.4 overs)
Ryan Rickelton 44 (27); Dunith Wellalage 2/23 (4 overs)		David Miller 45 (26); Kagiso Rabada 2/18 (4 overs)

MI Cape Town won by 39 runs
St George's Park Cricket Ground, Gqeberha
Umpires: Bongani Jele (SA) and Allahuddien Paleker (SA)
Player of the match: Delano Potgieter (MI Cape Town)

- Paarl Royals won the toss and elected to field.

=== Eliminator ===
Eliminator
5 February 2025
17:30 (D/N)
Scorecard

Sunrisers Eastern Cape; 184/6 (20 overs)	v	Joburg Super Kings; 152/7 (20 overs)
Aiden Markram 62* (40); Imran Tahir 2/21 (4 overs)		Jonny Bairstow 37 (17); Craig Overton 2/20 (4 overs)

Sunrisers Eastern Cape won by 32 runs
Centurion Park, Centurion
Umpires: Marais Erasmus (SA) and Arno Jacobs (SA)
Player of the match: Aiden Markram (Sunrisers Eastern Cape)

- Joburg Super Kings won the toss and elected to field.

=== Qualifier 2 ===
Qualifier 2
6 February 2025
17:30 (D/N)
Scorecard

Paarl Royals; 175/4 (20 overs)	v	Sunrisers Eastern Cape; 177/2 (19.2 overs)
Rubin Hermann 81* (53); Craig Overton 1/24 (4 overs); Aiden Markram 1/24 (4 overs)		Tony de Zorzi 78 (49); Dunith Wellalage 1/26 (3 overs)

Sunrisers Eastern Cape won by 8 wickets
Centurion Park, Centurion
Umpires: Stephen Harris (SA) and Lubabalo Gcuma (SA)
Player of the match: Tony de Zorzi (Sunrisers Eastern Cape)

- Paarl Royals won the toss and elected to bat.

=== Final ===
Final
8 February 2025
17:30 (D/N)
Scorecard

MI Cape Town; 181/8 (20 overs)	v	Sunrisers Eastern Cape; 105 (18.4 overs)
Connor Esterhuizen 39 (26); Richard Gleeson 2/22 (4 overs)		Tom Abell 30 (25); Kagiso Rabada 4/25 (3.4 overs)

MI Cape Town won by 76 runs
Wanderers Stadium, Johannesburg
Umpires: Lubabalo Gcuma (SA) and Allahudien Paleker (SA)
Player of the match: Trent Boult (MI Cape Town)

- MI Cape Town won the toss and elected to bat.

== Statistics ==
=== Most runs ===
Source: ESPNCricinfo

Player	Team	Innings	Runs	Highest score
Lhuan-dre Pretorius	Paarl Royals	12	397	97
Rassie van der Dussen	MI Cape Town	11	393	91*
Aiden Markram	Sunrisers Eastern Cape	13	340	82
Ryan Rickelton	MI Cape Town	8	336	89
Rubin Hermann	Paarl Royals	9	333	81*

=== Most wickets ===
Source: ESPNCricinfo

Player	Team	Matches	Wickets	Best bowling
Marco Jansen	Sunrisers Eastern Cape	13	19	4/13
Hardus Viljoen	Joburg Super Kings	8	14	4/24
Liam Dawson	Sunrisers Eastern Cape	12	14	3/17
Mujeeb Ur Rahman	Paarl Royals	12	14	2/17
Richard Gleeson	Sunrisers Eastern Cape	13	14	2/12

=== Highest team totals ===
Source: ESPNCricinfo

Team	Scores	Opponent	Result	Venue
MI Cape Town	222/3	Pretoria Capitals	Won	Centurion
Paarl Royals	213/2	Pretoria Capitals	Won	Centurion
Pretoria Capitals	212/5	Paarl Royals	Lost	Centurion
Durban's Super Giants	209/4	Pretoria Capitals	Won	Durban
Pretoria Capitals	207/6	Durban's Super Giants	Lost	Durban

== Awards ==
On 8 February 2025, the list of end of season awards was announced, to be handed out after the final match.

Team	Award	Prize money
MI Cape Town	Champions	R32.5 million (US$2.2 million)
Sunrisers Eastern Cape	Runners-up	R16.25 million (US$1.1 million)
MI Cape Town	Spirit of the season	R100,000 (US$6,765.9)

Name	Team	Award	Prize money
Marco Jansen	Sunrisers Eastern Cape	Player of the season	R350,000 (US$23,680.65)
Lhuan-dre Pretorius	Paarl Royals	Batter of the season	R200,000 (US$13,531.8)
Marco Jansen	Sunrisers Eastern Cape	Bowler of the season	R200,000 (US$13,531.8)
Dewald Brevis	MI Cape Town	Rising star	R100,000 (US$6,765.9)
Donovan Ferreira	Joburg Super Kings	Dispatch of the Season	R100,000 (US$6,765.9)
Dewald Brevis	MI Cape Town	Catch of the Season	R50,000 (US$3,382.95)
