= Richard Madley =

Welsh auctioneer

Richard Madley is a British auctioneer from Wales. He served as the auctioneer of the Indian Premier League auctions since the inception of the league in 2008 and last appeared as an auctioneer at an IPL auction in 2018. He was nicknamed as the Hammer Man.

== Career ==
Madley represented Wales in junior international hockey and also played cricket in the Surrey League. In junior hockey, he represented Wales at various age groups namely under-18, under-19 ans under-21 levels at European Championships. Richard joined the prominent auction house of Phillips Son and Neale in Stratford, New Bond Street in 1978 initially working as a floor sweeper. At Phillips Son and Neale, he was then promoted as a salesroom porter thereby embarking on a career trajectory oriented towards auctioneering. He also hosted auctions of Impressionist Art, Old Master drawings, fine jewellery and 18th century furniture.

He also learnt the basics of portering, sales & marketing, accountancy and cataloguing in addition to auctioneering during his corporate career. He was introduced to host rugby memorabilia auctions in Arms Park Rugby Stadium in Cardiff. He was later appointed as an auctioneer for the Welsh Rugby Players Association. He also appeared in television and radio broadcasts on BBC and ITV. He predominantly worked as an auction expert for the BBC television game show Bargain Hunt, which was regarded as the most popular daytime TV programme in Great Britain.

After working at Philips Son and Neale for nearly two decades, he accepted an invitation to join Christie's as President of Christie's East, New York. He began working as an auctioneer after moving to New York and engaged in auctioning baseball memorabilia. He hosted auctions selling baseball memorabilia, rugby memorabilia before making a switch to cricket.

In September 2001, he was the last auctioneer to conduct an auction at the World Trade Center in New York City, eight days before it was destroyed in the September 11 attacks.

Madley became popular among fans for his approach to the role of auctioneer during his ten-year stint in the Indian Premier League. He was brought on board as auctioneer for the 2008 Indian Premier League auction. He was regarded as the face of the Indian Premier League auctions, but his popularity plunged in late 2018, when Board of Control for Cricket in India decided to part ways with him prior to the 2019 IPL auction, as BCCI replaced him with Hugh Edmeades. The London Times said that he was the most important man in cricket during the auctions.

He said that he witnessed an important moment as an auctioneer when Chennai Super Kings franchise went all out to acquire Indian wicketkeeper batsman MS Dhoni during the inaugural IPL auction which was held on 20 February 2008.

In September 2024, he was appointed as an auctioneer to host the player auction ahead of the 2025 SA20.
