= Madley (surname) =

Madley is a surname. Notable people with the surname include:

- Andrew Madley (born 1983), English football referee
- Bobby Madley (born 1985), English football referee
- Richard Madley, Welsh auctioneer
- Romy Madley Croft (born 1989), English musician

== See also ==
- Malley
