= Boland Park =

Cricket stadium

Coordinates: 33°44′29″S 18°59′54″E

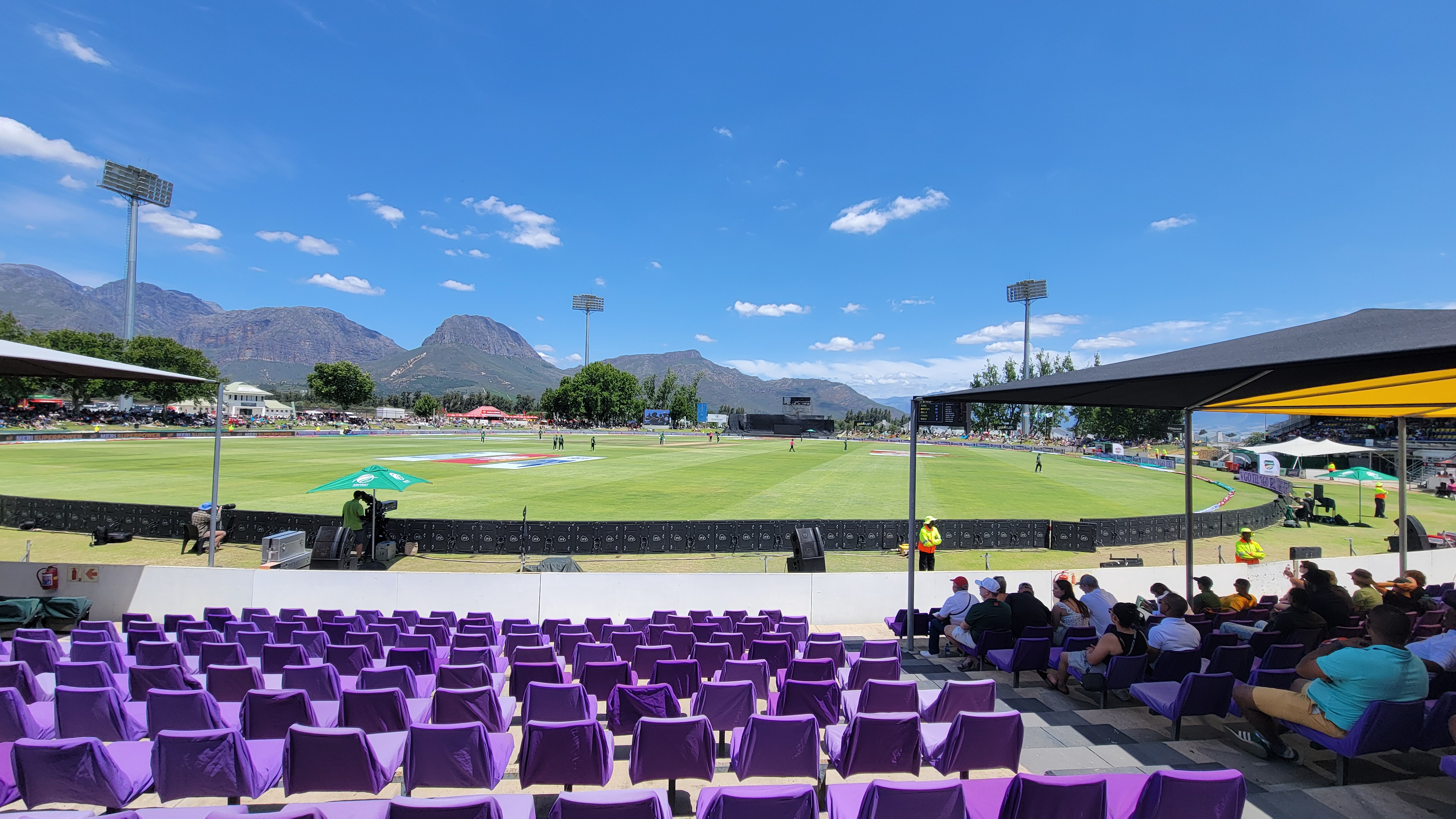
- Boland Park Cricket Ground during the South Africa vs Pakistan One Day International on 17 December 2024
- Interactive map of Boland Park

Ground information
- Location: Paarl, South Africa
- Country: South Africa
- Establishment: 1996
- Capacity: 10,000
- Operator: Boland
- End names
- Riebeeck Kelders End; Stables End

International information
- First ODI: 27 January 1997: India v Zimbabwe
- Last ODI: 17 December 2024: South Africa v Pakistan
- Only T20I: 29 November 2020: South Africa v England
- Only women's Test: 19–22 March 2002: South Africa v India
- First WODI: 16 October 2009: South Africa v West Indies
- Last WODI: 24 October 2016: South Africa v New Zealand
- First WT20I: 25 October 2009: South Africa v West Indies
- Last WT20I: 19 February 2023: New Zealand v Sri Lanka

Team information
Boland	(1996-present)
Cape Cobras	(2005-2021)
Paarl Rocks	(2018-2019)
Paarl Royals	(2023-present)
- As of 21 December 2023; Source: Cricinfo

Boland Park is a multi-purpose stadium in Paarl, South Africa. It is currently used mostly for cricket matches and hosted three matches during the 2003 Cricket World Cup. Boland cricket team and the Paarl Royals both stage home matches at the ground. The stadium has a capacity of 10,000 people.

== History ==
- In 1997, the stadium hosted its first One Day International (ODI) match between India and Zimbabwe. It was a Tri-Series match which ended in a tie.
- On 11 January 2012, hosts South Africa beat Sri Lanka by a margin of 258 runs in an ODI. Sri Lanka were dismissed for a low total of 43, the lowest ODI total in their history.

=== 2003 Cricket World Cup ===
The following 2003 Cricket World Cup matches were played at Boland Park.

12 February 2003
Scorecard

India; 204 (48.5 overs)	v	Netherlands; 136 (48.1 overs)
Sachin Tendulkar 52 (72); Tim de Leede 4/35 (9.5 overs)		Daan van Bunge 62 (116); Javagal Srinath 4/30 (9.1 overs)

India won by 68 runs
Boland Park, Paarl, South Africa
Umpires: Daryl Harper and Peter Willey
Player of the match: Tim de Leede (NED)

- India won the toss and elected to bat first.

19 February 2003
Scorecard

Canada; 36 (18.4 overs)	v	Sri Lanka; 37/1 (4.4 overs)
Joe Harris 9 (13); Prabath Nissanka 4/12 (7 overs)		Marvan Atapattu 24* (14); Sanjayan Thuraisingam 1/22 (2.4 overs)

Sri Lanka won by 9 wickets.
Boland Park, Paarl, South Africa
Umpires: Neil Mallender and David Shepherd
Player of the match: Prabath Nissanka (SL)

- Sri Lanka won the toss and elected to field first.

25 February 2003
Scorecard

Pakistan; 253/9 (39 overs)	v	Netherlands; 156 (39.3 overs)
Yousuf Youhana 58 (59); Daan van Bunge 2/27 (4 overs)		Daan van Bunge 31 (60); Wasim Akram 3/24 (8.3 overs)

Pakistan won by 97 runs
Boland Park, Paarl, South Africa
Umpires: Steve Bucknor and Srinivas Venkataraghavan
Player of the match: Yousuf Youhana (PAK)

- Netherlands won the toss and elected to field first.

== International centuries ==
Ten ODI centuries have been scored at the venue.

No.	Score	Player	Team	Balls	Innings	Opposing team	Date	Result
1	100*	Jacques Kallis	South Africa	139	2	Sri Lanka	9 January 2001	Won
2	111	Saurav Ganguly	India	124	1	Kenya	24 October 2001	Won
3	146	Sachin Tendulkar	India	132	1	Kenya	24 October 2001	Won
4	102*	Gary Kirsten	South Africa	118	2	Pakistan	16 December 2002	Won
5	112	Hashim Amla	South Africa	128	1	Sri Lanka	11 January 2012	Won
6	176	AB De Villiers	South Africa	104	1	Bangladesh	18 October 2017	Won
7	123	Heinrich Klaasen	South Africa	114	1	Australia	29 February 2020	Won
8	110	Temba Bavuma	South Africa	143	1	India	19 January 2022	Won
9	129	Rassie van der Dussen	South Africa	98	1	India	19 January 2022	Won
10	108	Sanju Samson	India	114	1	South Africa	23 December 2023	Won

== International five-wicket hauls ==
As of 7 March 2020

Two five-wicket hauls have been taken on the ground, both in men's One Day Internationals.

Five-wicket hauls in Men's One Day Internationals at Boland Park
No.	Bowler	Date	Team	Opposing Team	Inn	O	R	W	Result
1	Eddo Brandes	27 January 1997	Zimbabwe	India	2	9.5	41	5	Tie
2	Lasith Malinga	11 January 2012	Sri Lanka	South Africa	1	10	54	5	South Africa won
