= Caleb Seleka =

South African cricketer (born 2002)

Personal information
- Born: 22 November 2002 (age 23); Welkom, South Africa

Domestic team information
- Years: Team
- 2022/23-present: Joburg Super Kings
- 2025-present: Shenfield CC, UK
- Source: Cricinfo, 1 September 2022

Caleb Seleka (born 22 November 2002) is a South African cricketer. He was included in the Joburg Super Kings squad for the 2022–23 SA20. In February 2022, he was included in the North West Dragons squad for the 2021–22 CSA T20 Challenge. In September 2022, he was included in the North West Dragons squad, ahead of the 2022–23 cricket season in South Africa.
