= Chris Benjamin (cricketer) =

South African cricketer

Personal information
- Full name: Christopher Gavin Benjamin
- Born: 29 April 1999 (age 27); Johannesburg, Gauteng, South Africa
- Batting: Right-handed
- Bowling: Right-arm medium
- Role: Wicket-keeper

Domestic team information
- Years: Team
- 2019: Durham MCCU
- 2021–2024: Warwickshire (squad no. 12)
- 2022: → Durham (on loan)
- 2021–2023: Birmingham Phoenix
- 2025: MI Cape Town
- 2025: Kent
- FC debut: 26 March 2019 Durham MCCU v Durham
- LA debut: 22 July 2021 Warwickshire v Glamorgan

Career statistics
Competition	FC	LA	T20
Matches	26	18	75
Runs scored	1463	400	998
Batting average	35.68	28.57	19.96
100s/50s	3/7	0/3	0/3
Top score	127	75	68*
Catches/stumpings	31/0	9/0	33/0
- Source: Cricinfo, 16 June 2026

Christopher Gavin Benjamin (born 29 April 1999) is a South African cricketer who plays for Kent County Cricket Club. He made his first-class debut on 26 March 2019, for Durham MCCU against Durham, as part of the Marylebone Cricket Club University fixtures. In July 2021, he was awarded a rookie contract with Warwickshire County Cricket Club. He made his Twenty20 debut on 18 July 2021, for Birmingham Bears in the 2021 T20 Blast. He made his List A debut on 22 July 2021, for Warwickshire in the 2021 Royal London One-Day Cup.

Benjamin was a last minute addition to the Birmingham Phoenix team for the 2021 season of The Hundred, replacing injured Warwickshire teammate Adam Hose just one day before the tournament was due to begin. He received wide praise for his performance in the Phoenix's first match, scoring 24 runs in 15 balls against the London Spirit to secure a three-wicket victory. In August 2021, in the 2021 County Championship, Benjamin scored his maiden century in first-class cricket.

Benjamin attended St. Andrew's College, Grahamstown. In April 2022, he was bought by the Birmingham Phoenix for the 2022 season of The Hundred.

In September 2024, Benjamin left Warwickshire to join Kent on a three-year contract.
