= Corbin Bosch =

South African cricketer

Personal information
- Full name: Corbin Bosch
- Born: 10 September 1994 (age 32); Durban, South Africa
- Batting: Right-handed
- Bowling: Right-arm fast medium
- Role: All-rounder
- Relatives: Tertius Bosch (father); Eathan Bosch (brother)

International information
- National side: South Africa
- Test debut (cap 368): 26 December 2024 v Pakistan
- Last Test: 14 November 2025 v India
- ODI debut (cap 154): 22 December 2024 v Pakistan
- Last ODI: 30 September 2026 v Australia
- T20I debut (cap 110): 14 July 2025 v Zimbabwe
- Last T20I: 4 March 2026 v New Zealand

Domestic team information
- Years: Team
- 2014/15–2019/20: Titans
- 2015/16–present: Northerns
- 2018/19–2019/20: Tshwane Spartans
- 2020/21: Cape Cobras
- 2022: Barbados Royals
- 2023: Paarl Royals
- 2023: St Kitts & Nevis Patriots
- 2023/24: Pretoria Capitals
- 2024/25-present: MI Cape Town
- 2025-present: Mumbai Indians

Career statistics
Competition	Test	ODI	T20I	FC
Matches	4	16	22	38
Runs scored	245	331	115	1,540
Batting average	61.25	55.16	12.77	42.77
100s/50s	1/1	0/1	0/0	1/11
Top score	100*	67	30*	100*
Balls bowled	520	748	450	5,415
Wickets	16	19	33	88
Bowling average	18.87	44.36	17.93	33.50
5 wickets in innings	1	0	0	2
10 wickets in match	0	0	0	0
Best bowling	5/43	4/60	4/14	5/43
Catches/stumpings	3/–	5/–	9/–	24/–
Medal record
Men's cricket
Representing South Africa
World Test Championship
Winner	2023–2025
- Source: ESPNcricinfo, 30 September 2026

Corbin Bosch (born 10 September 1994) is a South African cricketer. He played in the 2014 U19 World Cup. He is the son of South African former cricketer Tertius Bosch. He is an all-rounder who usually bats in the middle order.

== Domestic career ==
Bosch was part of the South Africa under-19 cricket team which won the 2014 ICC Under-19 Cricket World Cup. He made his T20 debut for Titans against Knights in the 2014–15 Ram Slam T20 Challenge on 7 November 2014. He made his first-class debut for Titans in the 2017–18 Sunfoil Series on 28 September 2017. He made his List A debut for Northerns in the 2017–18 CSA Provincial One-Day Challenge on 7 January 2018.

In June 2018, Bosch was named in the squad for the Titans team for the 2018–19 season. In July 2019, he was selected to play for the Dublin Chiefs in the inaugural edition of the Euro T20 Slam cricket tournament. However, the following month the tournament was cancelled.

In September 2019, Bosch was named in the squad for the Tshwane Spartans team for the 2019 Mzansi Super League tournament. In April 2021, he was named in Northerns' squad, ahead of the 2021–22 cricket season in South Africa. In May 2022, Corbin replaced Nathan Coulter-Nile in Rajasthan Royals for IPL 2022 season. He represented Barbados Royals in the 2022 Caribbean Premier League. He was brought by Paarl Royals for SA20 league for the 2022 season. Corbin Bosch's IPL team is the Mumbai Indians. He joined the team for the IPL 2025 season as a replacement player for the injured Lizaad Williams.

In April 2023, he was named in South Africa A squad for their tour of Sri Lanka to play against Sri Lanka A in three List A matches and two first-class matches.

== International career ==
In December 2024, he received his maiden call-up to join South Africa's Test squad for their two-match test series against Pakistan as part of a crucial World Test Championship assignment as far as South Africa were concerned due to the test series had been regarded as a qualification pathway for Proteas to play the World Test Championship final. On 20 December 2024, he later received his maiden ODI call-up during the middle of South Africa's home ODI series against Pakistan, as he was brought into the mix, prior to the start of the third ODI as an injury replacement to Ottneil Baartman who was ruled out due to right knee injury. He made his ODI debut against Pakistan on 22 December 2024 and Saim Ayub became his first ODI wicket as Bosch dismissed the centurion for 101 runs. He finished with figures of 1/69 in his quota of 9 overs on his ODI debut. He also followed it up with a gritty innings of 40 off just 44 balls on his ODI debut including 5 boundaries after coming on to bat at number eight position, especially when South Africa were reeling at 194 runs for the loss of 6 wickets, in pursuit of a mammoth target of 309 runs to chase.

He made his test match debut against Pakistan on 26 December 2024 coinciding with the Boxing Day at the Centurion SuperSport Park. During Pakistan's first innings, he made early inroads after striking with a breakthrough off his very first delivery in Test cricket by dismissing Pakistani skipper Shan Masood for 17 runs. During the process, he became the 25th cricketer to take a wicket with his first ball in Tests and the fifth South African to do so. He eventually picked up a four-wicket haul finishing with figures of 4/63 from 15 overs including four maidens in Pakistan's first innings. He also scored a half-century on his debut test match in his first innings as he ended up as the second highest prolific scorer for South Africa in their first innings total of 301, with a gritty unbeaten knock of 81 coming off only 93 balls including a tally of 15 boundaries. He came into bat at number nine position at a time when South Africa were reeling at 191 runs for the loss of 7 wickets, with South Africa still trailing by 20 runs against Pakistan's first innings scorecard of 211 and he played a crucial innings under pressure to propel a slightly marginal healthy lead of 90 for South Africa to make it an evenly poised contest between the two sides. He also set a new record for having registered the highest individual score by a number nine batsman on test debut surpassing the previous best score of 72 made by Sri Lanka's Milan Rathnayake against England in 2024. He also became first South African to complete a double of a four-wicket haul and a half-century on test debut. His unbeaten knock of 81 also shattered the record for the highest individual score by a South African number 8 batsman or below on test debut.

In March 2025, the PCB issued a legal notice to Bosch, accusing him of breaching contractual obligations after he withdrew from PSL 2025 to sign with Mumbai Indians for IPL 2025.

In June 2025, he scored his maiden century in Tests against Zimbabwe at Queens Sports Club in Bulawayo.

== International centuries ==
Test centuries by Corbin Bosch
No.	Runs	Balls	Innings	Against	Venue	Country	Date	Result
1	100*	124	1	Zimbabwe	Queens Sports Club, Bulawayo	Zimbabwe	28 June 2025	South Africa won by 328 runs

== International five-wicket hauls ==
Test five-wicket hauls by Corbin Bosch
No.	Bowling Figures	Overs	Innings	Against	Venue	Country	Date	Result
1	5/43	12	4	Zimbabwe	Queens Sports Club, Bulawayo	Zimbabwe	28 June 2025	South Africa won by 328 runs
