= Richard Gleeson =

English cricketer (born 1987)

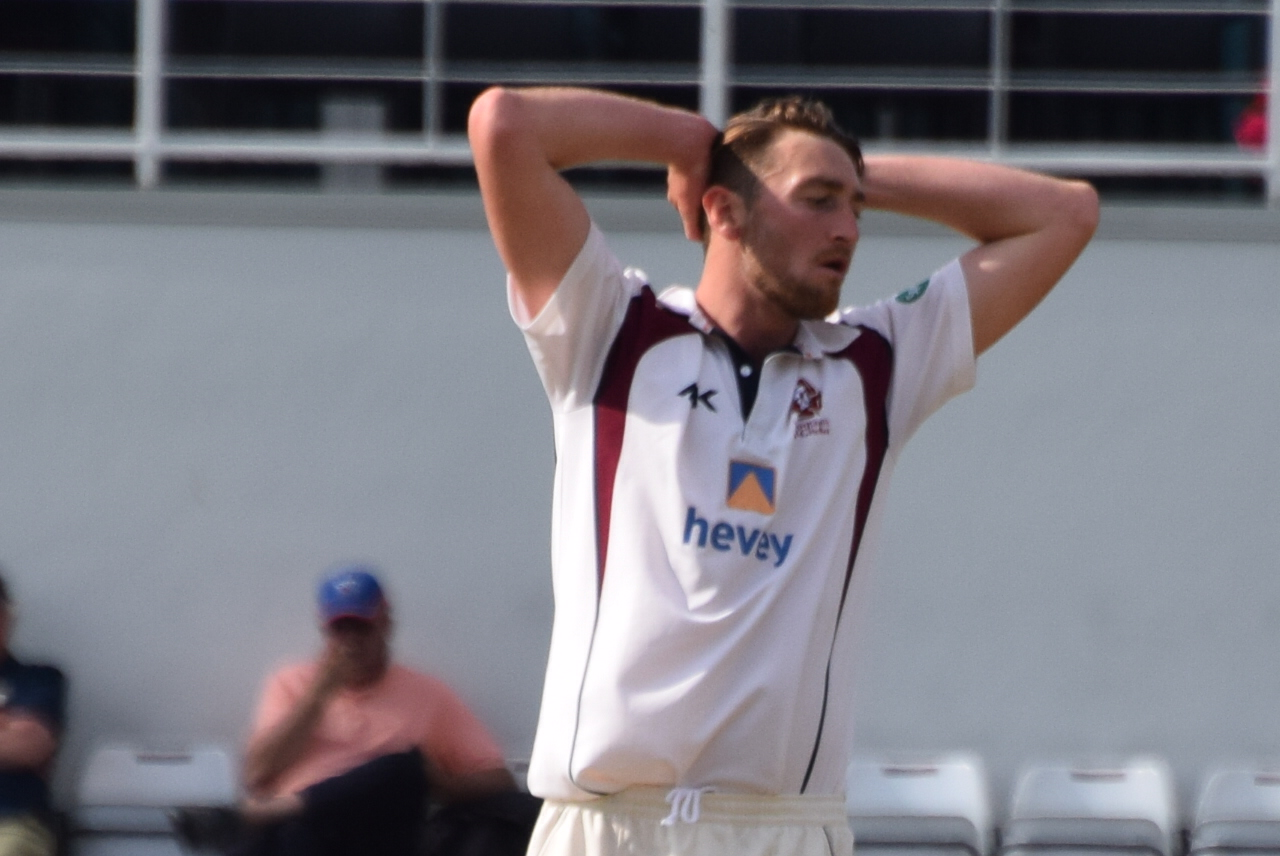

Personal information
- Full name: Richard James Gleeson
- Born: 2 December 1987 (age 38); Blackpool, Lancashire, England
- Height: 1.93 m (6 ft 4 in)
- Batting: Right-handed
- Bowling: Right-arm fast-medium
- Role: Bowler

International information
- National side: England (2022)
- T20I debut (cap 95): 9 July 2022 v India
- Last T20I: 30 September 2022 v Pakistan

Domestic team information
- Years: Team
- 2015–2018: Northamptonshire (squad no. 33)
- 2016: Rangpur Riders (squad no. 33)
- 2018: → Lancashire (on loan) (squad no. 11)
- 2019–2023: Lancashire (squad no. 11)
- 2019/20: Melbourne Renegades (squad no. 33)
- 2022–2023: Manchester Originals
- 2024: Durban's Super Giants
- 2024: Chennai Super Kings
- 2024–present: Warwickshire
- 2024–2025: London Spirit
- 2025: Sunrisers Eastern Cape
- 2025: Mumbai Indians
- 2026: Islamabad United
- 2026: MI London
- 2026: Amsterdam Flames

Career statistics
Competition	T20I	FC	LA	T20
Matches	6	34	21	167
Runs scored	2	259	53	68
Batting average	1.00	11.26	6.62	3.77
100s/50s	0/0	0/0	0/0	0/0
Top score	2	31	13	8
Balls bowled	126	5,526	841	3,281
Wickets	9	143	28	198
Bowling average	20.77	21.34	29.14	23.25
5 wickets in innings	0	10	1	1
10 wickets in match	0	1	0	0
Best bowling	3/15	6/43	5/47	5/33
Catches/stumpings	4/–	8/–	3/–	29/–
- Source: Cricinfo, 25 September 2026

Richard James Gleeson (born 2 December 1987) is an English cricketer, who plays for Warwickshire in domestic cricket. He made his international debut for the England cricket team in July 2022.

== Career ==
He made his first-class debut for Northamptonshire against the Australians on 15 August 2015 and his List A debut for Northamptonshire against Lancashire on 8 June 2016 in the Royal London One-Day Cup.

Initially, Gleeson played for Northants on a match-by-match basis while continuing his full-time job coaching in schools and cricket clubs on behalf of the Lancashire Cricket Board, but in July 2016 he signed a three-year contract with Northants. He signed to play Twenty20 cricket for the Rangpur Riders in the 2016 Bangladesh Premier League. He moved from Northamptonshire to Lancashire towards the end of the 2018 season.

On being named in England's training squad in May 2020, and the possibility of playing for England, Gleeson said "never give up, keep following your dream and keep pursuing things". On 9 July 2020, Gleeson was included in England's 24-man squad to start training behind closed doors for the One Day International (ODI) series against Ireland, and was later named as one of three reserve players in England's squad for the series.

On 29 May 2022, in the 2022 T20 Blast, Gleeson took his first five-wicket haul in Twenty20 cricket, with 5/33 against the Worcestershire Rapids.

In July 2022, Gleeson was named in England's Twenty20 International (T20I) squad for their home series against India. He made his T20I debut on 9 July 2022, for England against India, taking the wickets of Rohit Sharma, Virat Kohli and Rishabh Pant, finishing with figures of 3/15.
