= Dewald Brevis =

South African cricketer (born 2003)

Personal information
- Born: 29 April 2003 (age 23); Johannesburg, South Africa
- Nickname: Baby AB
- Batting: Right-handed
- Bowling: Right-arm leg-break
- Role: Batsman

International information
- National side: South Africa
- Test debut (cap 370): 28 June 2025 v Zimbabwe
- Last Test: 23 October 2025 v Pakistan
- ODI debut (cap 159): 19 August 2025 v Australia
- Last ODI: 13 September 2026 v Namibia
- T20I debut (cap 97): 30 August 2023 v Australia
- Last T20I: 6 September 2026 v Zimbabwe
- T20I shirt no.: 17

Domestic team information
- Years: Team
- 2021–2023: Titans
- 2022–2024: Mumbai Indians
- 2022: St Kitts & Nevis Patriots
- 2022–2023: Northerns
- 2023–2024: MI Cape Town
- 2023-2024: MI New York
- 2025–present: Chennai Super Kings
- 2025: Hampshire
- 2026–present: Pretoria Capitals
- 2026: London Spirit

Career statistics
Competition	Test	ODI	T20I	FC
Matches	4	9	30	24
Runs scored	138	230	697	1,460
Batting average	23.00	28.75	26.80	38.42
100s/50s	0/2	0/1	1/1	4/8
Top score	54	54	125*	159
Balls bowled	26	24	–	539
Wickets	1	0	–	11
Bowling average	22.00	–	–	36.54
5 wickets in innings	0	0	–	0
10 wickets in match	0	0	–	0
Best bowling	1/22	–	–	4/65
Catches/stumpings	3/–	5/–	14/–	22/–
- Source: ESPNcricinfo, 25 March 2026

Dewald Tobias Brevis (born 29 April 2003) is a South African cricketer who plays for the South African national cricket team in all formats of the game. He plays for the Titans in domestic cricket and Chennai Super Kings in the Indian Premier League. He is a right handed batsman and occasionally bowls leg spin. He holds the record for the highest score in T20 cricket in South Africa as well as the fastest 150 in T20 cricket in South Africa.

== Youth career ==
=== U19 World Cup ===
In November 2021, Brevis was named in South Africa's team for the 2022 ICC Under-19 Cricket World Cup in the West Indies. During the tournament, he scored two centuries and three fifties, and was named the Player of the Tournament, after scoring 506 runs, breaking Shikhar Dhawan's tournament record of 505.

In April 2021, he was signed by Northerns ahead of the 2021–22 domestic cricket season in South Africa. He made his Twenty20 debut on 8 October 2021, for the South Africa Under-19s against Easterns in the 2021–22 CSA Provincial T20 Knock-Out tournament. He scored 46 from 25 balls.

He made his List A debut on 2 December 2022, playing for the Titans against the Lions in Centurion.

His first class debut was for the Titans against the Dolphins on 26 February 2023, in Durban.

Brevis holds the record for the highest T20 score in South Africa, and equals the third highest score in the world. On 31 October 2022, Brevis smashed 162 runs off just 57 balls for the Titans against the Knights at the JB Marks Oval in Potchefstroom. He also achieved the world record for the fastest T20 150 when he reached the milestone off only 52 deliveries. He also became the youngest South African to hit a century.

== Franchise career ==
In February 2022, Brevis was bought by the Mumbai Indians (MI) in the 2022 Indian Premier League auction. He was retained by MI for the 2023 & 2024 seasons.

Brevis played for St Kitts & Nevis Patriots in the 2022 edition of the CPL. In a game against the Trinbago Knight Riders he hit 5 sixes off 5 consecutive balls he faced.

Brevis was signed by MI Cape Town for the inaugural season of the SA20, and was retained for the 2024, 2025 editions. Brevis won the Rising Star award of 2025 season.

In July 2022, he was signed by the Kandy Falcons for the third edition of the Lanka Premier League.

He also played for MI New York in the inaugural 2023 season of the MLC in the USA. He scored an unbeaten 41 off 33 in the second qualifier to help MI New York reach the final, which they eventually won.

On 18 April 2025, Brevis was signed by the Chennai Super Kings as a replacement for the injured Gurjapneet Singh. On 25 May 2025 in the 67th match of the 2025 Indian Premier League He played a match winning knock of 57 off 23 which included 4 fours and 5 sixes against the Gujurat Titans which also earned him Man of the Match. He was retained for the 2026 IPL season.

In March 2025, Brevis signed a contract with Hampshire County Cricket Club to play for them in that year's T20 Blast, with an option to also feature in the County Championship team.

He was not retained by MI Cape Town before the SA20 Auction. He had been handed a R500,000 base price for the auction. On 9 September 2025, during the 2026 SA20 Auction, Brevis was bought by the Pretoria Capitals for a record-breaking R16.5 Million, surpassing Aiden Markram who was bought for R14 million by Durban's Super Giants in the same auction.

On 19 January 2026, Brevis signed for the London Spirit as one of the 8 marquee players signed.

== International career ==
In April 2023, he was named in South Africa A's first-class and List A squad for their tour to Sri Lanka.

Dewald Brevis received his first international callup on 14 August 2023, when he was named in the South African squad to take on Australia. He played his first international T20 on 30 August 2023 against Australia in Durban in a disappointing showing with the bat.

He made his Test cricket debut on June 28, 2025, which included him making a quickfire knock of 51 off 41 where he recorded 3 fours and 4 sixes. He had a 95 run partnership with Titans teammate Lhuan-dre Pretorius, Who was also on debut, which saved South Africa from an early collapse.

In August 2025, during the second T20I against Australia, he scored an unbeaten 125* off 56 balls and broke Faf du Plessis's record (119) of highest individual score by a South African cricketer in T20Is. He also became the youngest South African cricketer to score a century in T20Is. He also scored the fastest hundred against Australia in T20Is as well as the highest T20I score against Australia surpassing Ruturaj Gaikwad who scored 123 off 57 in late 2023.

He made his ODI debut against Australia on August 19, 2025, he scored 6 runs off 2 deliveries.

Brevis made his T20I World Cup debut in the 2026 Men's T20 World Cup against Canada on February 9, 2026, scoring 6 runs off 6 deliveries in a dominant 57 run win for South Africa in their opening game of the World Cup. South Africa went on to reach the semi-finals of the World Cup, losing to New Zealand. He scored 207 runs across the tournament including 45 off 29 in the Super 8s against India.

== Playing Style ==
Brevis is an aggressive right handed middle order batter. He is known for his massive "no-look" sixes, in which he strikes the ball with immense power while instantly looking down or away at the ground after connection. He employs a balanced, open stance, along with a high backlift and a backfoot to front foot load transfer. His swing is characterized by a vertical shoulder rotation, and a high, rapid follow through to impart immense power from the bat to the ball. Some of his favorite shots to employ include hitting boundaries down the ground, pick up pulls over long on, and unorthodox ramps, scoops, and sweeps.

== List of records ==
- Highest T20I score by a player for South Africa, 125* against Australia in Darwin
- Most runs in an Under-19 Cricket World Cup - 506 runs in the 2022 edition;
- Highest T20 score made in South Africa- 162, also the joint third-best T20 score at the time.
- Fastest to 150 in T20 cricket
- Youngest South African to score a century in men's T20s - At 19 years and 185 days old
- 3rd most runs in a T20i series against Australia, in Australia. He scored 180 runs in the series.

== International centuries ==
T20I centuries by Dewald Brevis
No.	Runs	Balls	Innings	Against	Venue	Country	Date	Result
1	125*	56	1	Australia	Marrara Oval, Darwin	Australia	12 August 2025	South Africa won by 53 runs
