= Delano Potgieter =

South African cricketer (born 1996)

Personal information
- Full name: Delano Potgieter
- Born: 5 August 1996 (age 30); Port Elizabeth, Eastern Cape, South Africa
- Batting: Left-handed
- Bowling: Right arm medium
- Role: All-rounder

Domestic team information
- Years: Team
- 2015/16–2019/20: Gauteng
- 2018/19–2020/21 2023/24–present: Lions
- 2019: Jozi Stars
- 2021/22–2022/23: North West
- 2023–2025: MI Cape Town
- 2025: Saint Lucia Kings
- 2026: Paarl Royals
- 2026: Hampshire

Career statistics
Competition	FC	LA	T20
Matches	55	69	101
Runs scored	2,784	1,578	1,355
Batting average	43.50	36.69	28.82
100s/50s	5/11	0/11	0/3
Top score	169*	96*	71
Balls bowled	6,535	2,193	746
Wickets	138	50	51
Bowling average	24.19	34.96	19.54
5 wickets in innings	4	0	2
10 wickets in match	0	0	0
Best bowling	6/33	4/22	5/10
Catches/stumpings	18/–	16/–	32/–
- Source: ESPNcricinfo, 4 September 2026

Delano Potgieter (born 5 August 1996) is a South African first-class cricketer. He made his first-class debut for Gauteng against Northerns. In September 2018, he was named in Gauteng's squad for the 2018 Africa T20 Cup. He was the leading run-scorer for Gauteng in the tournament, with 217 runs in six matches. He was the leading wicket-taker for Gauteng in the 2018–19 CSA Provincial One-Day Challenge, with 17 dismissals in nine matches.

In September 2019, he was named in the squad for the Jozi Stars team for the 2019 Mzansi Super League tournament. Later the same month, he was named in Gauteng's squad for the 2019–20 CSA Provincial T20 Cup. In April 2021, Potgieter was named in the South Africa Emerging Men's squad for their six-match tour of Namibia. Later the same month, he was named in North West's squad, ahead of the 2021–22 cricket season in South Africa.

In May 2026, Potgieter signed a short-term contract with Hampshire County Cricket Club to play three County Championship matches and in the opening stages of that year's T20 Blast.
