= SA20 =

South African cricket league

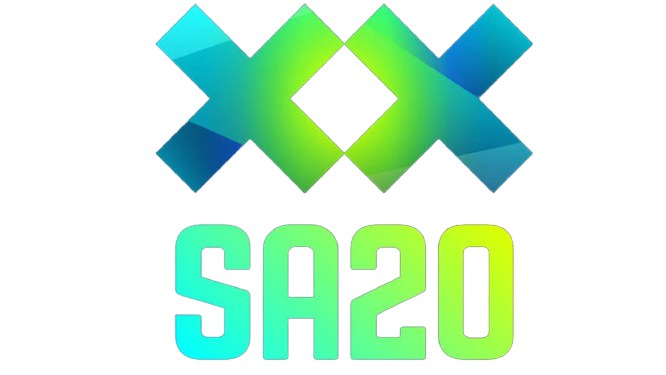
- Tournament logo
- Countries: South Africa
- Administrator: Cricket South Africa
- Format: Twenty20
- First edition: 2023
- Latest edition: 2026
- Next edition: 2027
- Tournament format: Double round-robin and playoffs
- Number of teams: 6
- Current champion: Sunrisers Eastern Cape (3rd title)
- Most successful: Sunrisers Eastern Cape (3 titles)
- Most runs: Ryan Rickelton (1,349)
- Most wickets: Ottniel Baartman (61)
- TV: South Africa: SuperSport; International: See list
- Website: sa20.co.za
- 2026 SA20

The SA20, also known as the Betway SA20 for sponsorship reasons, is a Twenty20 franchise cricket tournament in South Africa, organised by Cricket South Africa (CSA) and first contested during the 2023 season. It is contested by six teams based in cities around the country. Sunrisers Eastern Cape have won three of the first four editions of the tournament, with MI Cape Town winning the third season. The primary sponsor is Betway, sponsoring the league since it launched.

== History ==
Cricket South Africa established the franchise T20 Global League in 2017. The inaugural season was deferred by a year due to the lack of a broadcast deal and title sponsor and in June 2018 was replaced by the Mzansi Super League, a league featuring six CSA-owned teams. It did not become a huge success. The MSL ran for only two seasons, the 2020 and 2021 editions being cancelled due to the COVID-19 pandemic.

SA20 was established by CSA in 2022 through a newly formed entity, Africa Cricket Development (Pty) Limited (ACD). CSA is the majority stakeholder in ACD with a 50% share, while broadcaster SuperSport has a 30% share and former Indian Premier League (IPL) Chief Operating Officer Sundar Raman, the remaining 20%. All six of the teams were bought by franchises from the IPL. In July 2022, CSA announced that the One Day International series against Australia due to be played in January 2023 would be cancelled in order for SA20 to go ahead.

In August 2022, Graeme Smith was announced as the commissioner for the tournament. Later in the month, the marquee players for the first season were announced.

In December 2023 Cricket South Africa announced that it would send a makeshift Test team, comprising players with little or no Test cricket experience, to its scheduled two-Test tour of New Zealand in February 2024, to allow its best players to remain in South Africa to compete in the SA20. The decision was widely criticised. In January 2025, Cricket South Africa announced the windows for the competition for 2026, 2027, and 2028.

== Organisation ==
The six teams play each other twice in the group stages of the competition before the top four teams move to the playoffs stage.

Teams acquire players through an auction as opposed to a draft, making it the third cricket league in the world after the Indian Premier League and International League T20 to do so. Each team purchases a squad of 17 players, with the opportunity of signing up to five players prior to the auction: three international players; one South African international player; and one uncapped South African player.

=== Prize money ===
Cricket South Africa increased the prize money for the SA20 in 2024 to a total of $890,000 . The prize money is split between the teams as follows:

- R16,250,000– To the runner up
- R32,500,000 – To the champion of the season

The total prize money in the SA20 is R70 million.

=== Trophy ===
The trophy for the Betway T20 was unveiled in January 2023. The 24-carat gold and silver-plated trophy was designed and made by British silverware manufacturers Thomas Lyte. It features six handles, representing league's six founding franchises, with the tournament's logo engraved on the front of the trophy.

== Teams ==
The six teams are all owned by existing Indian Premier League franchise owners.

Location of SA20 teams

Team	City	Home ground	Owner	Captain	Head coach
Durban's Super Giants	Durban	Kingsmead Cricket Ground	RPSG Group	Aiden Markram	
Joburg Super Kings	Johannesburg	Wanderers Stadium	Chennai Super Kings Cricket Limited	Faf du Plessis	
MI Cape Town	Cape Town	Newlands Cricket Ground	Reliance Industries	Rashid Khan	
Paarl Royals	Paarl	Boland Park	Manoj Badale	David Miller	
Pretoria Capitals	Pretoria	SuperSport Park	JSW Group	Keshav Maharaj	
Sunrisers Eastern Cape	Gqeberha	St George's Park Cricket Ground	Sun Group	Tristan Stubbs	

== Tournament season and results ==
=== Finals ===
Year	Final			Final venue	Player of the season
Year	Winner	Result	Runner-up	Final venue	Player of the season
2023	Sunrisers Eastern Cape; 137/6 (16.2 overs)	Sunrisers Eastern Cape won by 4 wickets Scorecard	Pretoria Capitals; 135 (19.3 overs)	Wanderers Stadium, Johannesburg	Aiden Markram (SEC)
2024	Sunrisers Eastern Cape; 204/3 (20 overs)	Sunrisers Eastern Cape won by 89 runs Scorecard	Durban's Super Giants; 115 (17 overs)	Newlands Cricket Ground, Cape Town	Heinrich Klaasen (DSG)
2025	MI Cape Town; 181/8 (20 overs)	MI Cape Town won by 76 runs Scorecard	Sunrisers Eastern Cape; 105 (18.4 overs)	Wanderers Stadium, Johannesburg	Marco Jansen (SEC)
2026	Sunrisers Eastern Cape; 162/4 (19.2 overs)	Sunrisers Eastern Cape won by 6 wickets Scorecard	Pretoria Capitals; 158/7 (20 overs)	Newlands Cricket Ground, Cape Town	Quinton de Kock (SEC)

=== Number of titles ===
Team	Seasons won	Seasons runner-up	No. of playoffs played	No. of seasons played
Sunrisers Eastern Cape	3 (2023, 2024, 2026)	1 (2025)	4	4
MI Cape Town	1 (2025)		1	4
Pretoria Capitals		2 (2023, 2026)	2	4
Durban's Super Giants		1 (2024)	1	4
Joburg Super Kings			4	4
Paarl Royals			3	4

== Team performances ==
Season	2023	2024	2025	2026
Durban's Super Giants	5th	RU	6th	5th
Joburg Super Kings	SF	3rd	4th	4th
MI Cape Town	6th	6th	C	6th
Paarl Royals	SF	4th	3rd	3rd
Pretoria Capitals	RU	5th	5th	RU
Sunrisers Eastern Cape	C	C	RU	C

- C: Champions
- RU: Runner-up
- 3rd: Team won the 3rd place playoff
- 4th: Team lost the 3rd place playoff
- SF: Team qualified for the semi-final of the competition

=== Position of teams in SA20 ===
Year	1st	2nd	3rd	4th	5th	6th
2023	PC (R)	JSK	SEC (C)	PR	DSG	MICT
2024	SEC (C)	DSG (R)	PR	JSK	PC	MICT
2025	MICT (C)	PR	SEC (R)	JSK	PC	DSG
2026	SEC (C)	PC (R)	PR	JSK	DSG	MICT

- indicates qualified for playoffs
- (C) = Eventual champion; (R) = Runner-up

=== All time standings ===
Source: ESPNcricinfo (Last updated: 8 February 2025)
Team	Appearances			Best result	Statistics						
Team	Total	First	Latest	Best result	Played	Won	Lost	Tied+W	Tied+L	NR	Win%
Sunrisers Eastern Cape	4	2023	2026	Champions (2023, 2024, 2026)	36	22	13	0	0	1	62.85
MI Cape Town	4	2023	2026	Champions (2025)	32	15	16	0	0	1	48.38
Pretoria Capitals	4	2023	2026	Runners-up (2023, 2026)	32	13	16	0	0	3	44.82
Durban's Super Giants	4	2023	2026	Runners-up (2024)	33	14	16	0	0	3	46.66
Paarl Royals	4	2023	2026	Qualifier 2 (2024, 2026)	34	16	17	0	0	1	48.48
Joburg Super Kings	4	2023	2026	Qualifier 2 (2024)	33	14	16	0	0	3	46.66

== Records and statistics ==
Batting records
Most runs	Ryan Rickelton	1,349
Highest score	Shai Hope	118* vs Durban's Super Giants
Bowling records
Most wickets	Ottniel Baartman	61
Fielding
Most dismissals (wicket-keeper)	Tristan Stubbs	42
Most catches (fielder)	David Miller; Marco Jansen; Aiden Markram	18
Team records
Highest total	Durban's Super Giants	254/4 (20) vs Pretoria Capitals
Lowest total	Paarl Royals	49 (13.3) vs Sunrisers Eastern Cape

As of 8 February 2025

== Broadcasting ==
As of January 2023, Betway SA20 and Sky Sports have a five-year contract to broadcast the T20 cricket league.

Country	Channels	Year
Sub-saharan Africa	SuperSport	2023–present
Australia	Fox Sports	2025–present
Brunei	Willow TV	2025–present
Cambodia	Willow TV	2025–present
Canada	Willow TV	2025–present
Indonesia	Willow TV	2025–present
Laos	Willow TV	2025–present
Malaysia	Willow TV	2025–present
MENA	Willow TV	2025–present
Mexico	Willow TV	2025–present
Myanmar	Willow TV	2025–present
Philippines	Willow TV	2025–present
Singapore	Willow TV	2025–present
Thailand	Willow TV	2025–present
Timor Leste	Willow TV	2025–present
USA	Willow TV	2025–present
Vietnam	Willow TV	2025–present
Pan-Europe (exc. UK-IRE)	Triller TV	2025–present
Ireland	Sky Sports	2023–present
United Kingdom	Sky Sports	2023–present
Indian subcontinent	Star Sports	2023–present
Indian subcontinent	JioHotstar	2023–present
Pakistan	Geo Super	2025–present
Pakistan	mytv	2025–present
Pakistan	Tapmad	2025–present
