= Craig Overton =

English cricketer (born 1994)

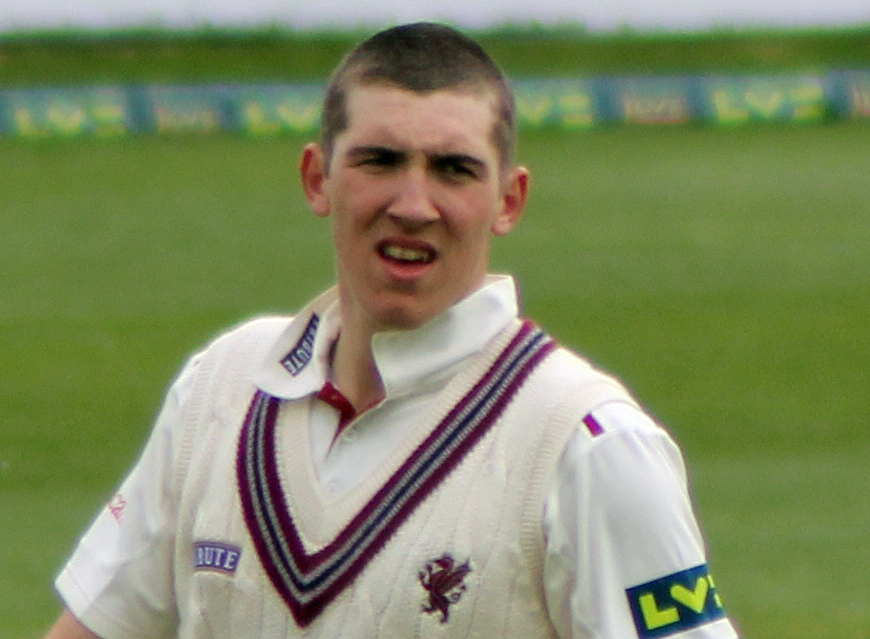

Personal information
- Born: 10 April 1994 (age 32); Barnstaple, Devon, England
- Height: 6 ft 5 in (1.96 m)
- Batting: Right-handed
- Bowling: Right-arm medium-fast
- Role: Bowling all-rounder
- Relatives: Jamie Overton (twin brother)

International information
- National side: England (2017–2022)
- Test debut (cap 681): 2 December 2017 v Australia
- Last Test: 24 March 2022 v West Indies
- ODI debut (cap 249): 21 June 2018 v Australia
- Last ODI: 17 July 2022 v India
- ODI shirt no.: 32

Domestic team information
- Years: Team
- 2012–present: Somerset (squad no. 7)
- 2021–2025: Southern Brave
- 2024/25: Sunrisers Eastern Cape
- 2026: Trent Rockets

Career statistics
Competition	Test	ODI	FC	LA
Matches	8	7	160	75
Runs scored	182	68	4,786	824
Batting average	15.16	22.66	23.93	22.27
100s/50s	0/0	0/0	4/22	0/2
Top score	41*	32	141	66*
Balls bowled	1,472	308	27,271	3,444
Wickets	21	5	556	95
Bowling average	36.19	58.20	23.78	32.16
5 wickets in innings	0	0	20	1
10 wickets in match	0	0	1	0
Best bowling	3/14	2/23	7/57	5/18
Catches/stumpings	7/–	4/–	163/–	33/–
- Source: ESPNcricinfo, 27 September 2026

Craig Overton (born 10 April 1994) is an English cricketer who plays for Somerset and England. He is an all-rounder who bowls right-arm medium-fast and bats right-handed. He made his international debut for England in December 2017. His twin brother Jamie Overton also plays cricket for England.

== Domestic career ==
Overton made his first-team debut for Somerset in the 2012 County Championship against Lancashire. He played seven County Championship games in 2012, taking 12 wickets at an average of 30.25. He also scored 75 runs at 10.71; scoring his maiden first-class half-century in the process. Overton also made his List A debut in the same year.

Overton was unable to play throughout much of the 2013 season due to a stress fracture of the back. He managed to play a single first-class match in which he took just a single wicket.

The 2014 season saw Overton become a regular selection for the first-team as he played 27 matches across all three formats. His batting improved greatly as he scored 431 runs in the County Championship in which he averaged 30.78 while also taking 42 wickets at 28.52. In a game against Lancashire, Overton fell short of making his maiden first-class century; given out while on 99. Making his debut in the twenty20 format, Overton struggled with both bat and ball taking just four wickets and scoring a total of 35 runs from 10 matches.

In 2015, Overton was the leading wicket-taker for Somerset in both the County Championship and the One Day Cup taking 47 and 12 wickets respectively. He continued his batting form in the longer form of the game as he averaged 28.38 in 16 County Championship innings.

During a County Championship match against Sussex in September 2015, Overton said "go back to your own fucking country" to Pakistani batsman Ashar Zaidi whilst bowling. The incident was considered racist by some but the Cricket Discipline Commission punished him only for using abusive language. It was his third minor offence—following another report for abusive language in the previous match and physical contact in May—and Overton received an automatic two-match ban. Zaidi later called on Overton to apologise.

Overton enjoyed another successful season in 2016 as he again made over 400 runs and took 34 wickets in the County Championship. During a Championship game against Hampshire, Overton made his maiden first-class century, scoring 138 as part of a stand of 217 for the eighth wicket with Roelof van der Merwe. This set a new record for the eighth wicket for Somerset, beating the previous record of 172 made by Ian Botham and Viv Richards in 1983, although the record was surpassed by Peter Trego and Ryan Davies in Somerset's next game.

In 2021, he was drafted by Southern Brave for the inaugural season of The Hundred. He played for them in 3 matches, picking up 3 wickets in total. In April 2022, he was bought by the Southern Brave for the 2022 season of The Hundred. The following month, in the 2022 County Championship, Overton took his 400th wicket in first-class cricket.

Overton was voted as the Professional Cricketers' Association 2026 Men's Player of the Year.

== International career ==
Overton first played international cricket for England Under-19s playing a total of 16 youth ODIs between 2011 and 2012. He scored a total of 350 runs at an average of 26.92 with a high score of 68* as well as taking 14 wickets at 35.57.

Overton received his first international call-up in June 2015 when he was selected as cover for Chris Jordan for England's third One Day International (ODI) against New Zealand.

In June 2017, Overton was named in England's Twenty20 International (T20I) squad for the series against South Africa.

In September 2017, Overton was named in England's Test squad for the 2017–18 Ashes series. He made his Test debut in the second Test at Adelaide, on 2 December 2017. He claimed Australian captain Steve Smith as his first Test wicket. In February 2018, he was added to England's ODI squad for their series against New Zealand, after Liam Plunkett was ruled out due to an injury. He made his ODI debut for England against Australia on 21 June 2018.

Overton replaced Chris Woakes for the fourth 2019 Ashes Test. In the first innings, he was brought into bat at number 3 as a nightwatchman after the early dismissal of Joe Denly.

On 29 May 2020, Overton was named in a 55-man group of players to begin training ahead of international fixtures starting in England following the COVID-19 pandemic. On 17 June 2020, Overton was included in England's 30-man squad to start training behind closed doors for the Test series against the West Indies. On 4 July 2020, Overton was named as one of the nine reserve players for the first Test match of the series.

On 30 July 2021, in England vs India's series, England's Ben Stokes announced that he would be taking an "indefinite break" from cricket. Overton was added to England's squad as his replacement.
