= Paarl Royals =

Western Cape-based franchise cricket team of SA20

- League: SA20

Personnel
- Captain: David Miller
- Coach: Trevor Penney
- Bowling coach: Marchant de Lange
- Owner: Manoj Badale; Lachlan Murdoch; RedBird Capital Partners

Team information
- City: Paarl, South Africa
- Colors: Pink and Blue
- Founded: 2023; 3 years ago
- Home ground: Boland Park, Paarl
- Capacity: 10,000

History
- Twenty20 debut: v. MI Cape Town at Newlands Cricket Ground, Cape Town; 10 January 2023
- SA20 wins: 0
- Official website: www.paarlroyals.com
T20I kit

Paarl Royals is a South African professional Twenty20 franchise cricket team that competes in the SA20 tournament. The team is based in Paarl, and was formed in 2022. The team's home-ground is Boland Park Cricket ground. The team is captained by David Miller and is coached by Shane Bond.

The franchise is owned by Manoj Badale.

== History ==
In August 2022, Cricket South Africa announced the establishment of the SA20, a Twenty20 Cricket competition to be started in 2023. The teams for the competition, representing six cities, including Paarl, were put up for auction in September 2022. The Paarl franchise was purchased by Manoj Badale.

== Current squads ==
- Players with international caps are listed in **bold**.

No.	Name	Nat.	Birth date	Batting style	Bowling style	Salary	Notes
Batters
	**David Miller**	(South Africa)	10 June 1989 (age 37)	Left-handed	Right-arm off break		Captain
	**Joe Root**	(England)	30 December 1990 (age 35)	Right-handed	Right-arm off break		Overseas; Wildcard
	Asa Tribe	(Jersey)	29 March 2004 (age 22)	Right-handed	Right-arm off break		Overseas
Wicket-keepers
	**Lhuan-dre Pretorius**	(South Africa)	27 March 2006 (age 20)	Left-handed			
	**Kyle Verreynne**	(South Africa)	12 May 1997 (age 29)	Right-handed			
	**Rubin Hermann**	(South Africa)	26 January 1997 (age 29)	Left-handed			
	Keagan Lion-Cachet	(South Africa)	19 March 2002 (age 24)	Right-handed			
	Thomas Rew	(England)	29 November 2007 (age 18)	Right-handed			Overseas
All-rounders
	**Sikandar Raza**	(Zimbabwe)	24 April 1986 (age 40)	Right-handed	Right-arm off break		Overseas
	Delano Potgieter	(South Africa)	5 August 1996 (age 30)	Left-handed	Right-arm medium		
	**Dan Lawrence**	(England)	12 July 1997 (age 29)	Right-handed	Right-arm off break		Overseas
	**Azmatullah Omarzai**	(Afghanistan)	24 March 2000 (age 26)	Right-handed	Right-arm medium		Overseas
Pace bowlers
	**Hardus Viljoen**	(South Africa)	6 March 1989 (age 37)	Right-handed	Right-arm fast		
	**Ottniel Baartman**	(South Africa)	18 March 1993 (age 33)	Right-handed	Right-arm fast		
	**Nqobani Mokoena**	(South Africa)	5 May 2006 (age 20)	Right-handed	Right-arm fast		
	J. J. Basson	(South Africa)	7 April 2008 (age 18)	Left-handed	Left-arm fast		
Spin bowlers
	**Gudakesh Motie**	(Cricket West Indies)	29 March 1995 (age 31)	Left-handed	Left-arm orthodox		Overseas
	**Bjorn Fortuin**	(South Africa)	21 October 1994 (age 32)	Right-handed	Left-arm orthodox		
	**Mujeeb Ur Rahman**	(Afghanistan)	28 March 2001 (age 25)	Right-handed	Right-arm off break		Overseas

== Statistics ==
=== Most runs ===
Player	Runs	Batting average	High score	100s	50s
David Miller	897	37.37	75*	0	2
Jos Buttler	799	39.95	70	0	7
LG Pretorius	621	28.22	98*	0	5
Rubin Hermann	559	32.88	81*	0	4
Jason Roy	408	18.54	68	0	2

Source: as of 26 January 2026

=== Most wickets ===
Player	Wickets	Bowling average	Best bowling
Bjorn Fortuin	39	29.66	3/14
Lungi Ngidi	26	29.26	4/39
Ottneil Baartman	20	13.55	5/16
Mujeeb Ur Rahman	19	27.36	2/17
Tabraiz Shamsi	18	27.00	2/11

Source: as of 26 January 2026

== Seasons ==
=== Seasons ===
Year	League standing	Final standing
2023	4th out of 6	Semifinals
2024	3rd out of 6	Eliminator
2025	2nd out of 6	Qualifier 2
2026	3rd out of 6	Qualifier 2

- C: champions
- RU: runner-up
- SF team qualified for the semi-final stage of the competition

=== Season summary ===
Year	Played	Wins	Losses	Tied/NR
2023	11	4	6	1
2024	11	5	6	0
2025	11	7	4	0
2026	12	6	5	1
Source: ESPNCricinfo

Note:

- NR indicates No result.
- Abandoned matches are indicated as no result.
