= George Linde =

South African cricketer (born 1991)

Personal information
- Full name: George Fredrik Linde
- Born: 4 December 1991 (age 34); Cape Town, Cape Province, South Africa
- Batting: Left-handed
- Bowling: Slow left-arm orthodox
- Role: All-rounder

International information
- National side: South Africa
- Test debut (cap 340): 19 October 2019 v India
- Last Test: 4 February 2021 v Pakistan
- ODI debut (cap 141): 4 September 2021 v Sri Lanka
- Last ODI: 6 November 2025 v Pakistan
- T20I debut (cap 87): 27 November 2020 v England
- Last T20I: 25 March 2026 v New Zealand
- T20I shirt no.: 27

Domestic team information
- Years: Team
- 2011/12–: Western Province
- 2014/15–2020/21: Cape Cobras
- 2017/18: South Western Districts
- 2018/19–2019/20: Cape Town Blitz
- 2022–2023: Kent
- 2022/23–2023/24: MI Cape Town
- 2022/23: Sylhet Strikers
- 2023: St Kitts and Nevis Patriots
- 2024: Lahore Qalanders
- 2025: Peshawar Zalmi
- 2025: MI New York
- 2025: Trent Rockets
- 2026: Lucknow Super Giants
- 2026: Nottinghamshire

Career statistics
Competition	Test	ODI	T20I	FC
Matches	3	4	37	83
Runs scored	135	29	403	3,681
Batting average	22.50	14.50	19.19	33.77
100s/50s	0/0	0/0	0/0	6/20
Top score	37	18	48	152
Balls bowled	473	150	660	14,384
Wickets	9	4	35	255
Bowling average	28.00	35.00	23.82	27.66
5 wickets in innings	1	0	0	15
10 wickets in match	0	0	0	3
Best bowling	5/64	2/32	4/21	7/29
Catches/stumpings	0/–	4/–	10/–	42/–
- Source: Cricinfo, 17 July 2026

George Fredrik Linde (born 4 December 1991) is a South African cricketer. He made his international debut for the South Africa cricket team in October 2019.

== Domestic and T20 career ==
He was included in the Western Province cricket team squad for the 2015 Africa T20 Cup. In August 2017, he was named in Benoni Zalmi's squad for the first season of the T20 Global League. However, in October 2017, Cricket South Africa initially postponed the tournament until November 2018, with it being cancelled soon after.

In June 2018, he was named in the squad for the Cape Cobras team for the 2018–19 season. In September 2018, he was named in Western Province's squad for the 2018 Africa T20 Cup. In October 2018, he was named in Cape Town Blitz's squad for the first edition of the Mzansi Super League T20 tournament. In September 2019, he was named in the squad for the Cape Town Blitz team for the 2019 Mzansi Super League tournament.

In January 2020, in the 2019–20 CSA 4-Day Franchise Series, Linde took his tenth five-wicket haul in first-class cricket. In July 2020, Linde was named the four-day cricketer of the year at Cricket South Africa's annual awards ceremony. In April 2021, he was named in Western Province's squad, ahead of the 2021–22 cricket season in South Africa.

In April 2021, he was signed by Multan Sultans to play in the rescheduled matches in the 2021 Pakistan Super League. In January 2022, Linde signed a two-year deal to play for Kent County Cricket Club in England.

In December 2025, he signed a contract to play for Nottinghamshire County Cricket Club in the 2026 T20 Blast.

== International career ==
On 5 September 2019, Linde was added to South Africa's Twenty20 International (T20I) squad for their series against India, but he did not play. The following month, he was added to South Africa's Test squad for the third match against India. He made his Test debut for South Africa, against India, on 19 October 2019. In March 2020, Linde was named in South Africa's One Day International (ODI) squad for their series against India. In November 2020, Linde was named in South Africa's squad for their limited overs series against England. He made his T20I debut for South Africa, against England, on 27 November 2020.

In February 2021, in South Africa's series against Pakistan, Linde took his first five-wicket haul in Test cricket. In August 2021, Linde was named in South Africa's ODI squad for their series against Sri Lanka. He made his ODI debut on 4 September 2021, for South Africa against Sri Lanka. Later the same month, Linde was named as one of three reserve players in South Africa's squad for the 2021 ICC Men's T20 World Cup.

In December 2024, he made a comeback in a T20 series against Pakistan and was named Player of the Match in the first game for his all-round performance.

== International five-wicket hauls ==
Test five-wicket hauls by George Linde
No.	Bowling Figures	Overs	Innings	Against	Venue	Country	Date	Result
1	5/64	26	3	Pakistan	Rawalpindi Cricket Stadium, Rawalpindi	Pakistan	4 February 2021	Pakistan won by 95 runs
