= MI Cape Town =

Cape Town-based franchise cricket team of SA20

- League: SA20

Personnel
- Captain: Rashid Khan
- Coach: Robin Peterson
- Bowling coach: Mitchell McClenaghan
- Owner: Reliance Industries

Team information
- City: Cape Town, South Africa
- Colors: Blue Gold
- Founded: 2023; 3 years ago
- Home ground: Newlands Cricket Ground, Cape Town
- Capacity: 25,000

History
- Twenty20 debut: v. Paarl Royals at Newlands Cricket Ground, Cape Town; 10 January 2023
- SA20 wins: 1: 2025
- Official website: MI Cape Town
T20I kit

MI Cape Town is a South African professional Twenty20 franchise cricket team that competes in the SA20 tournament. The team is based in Cape Town, and was formed in 2022. They are the 2025 champions of the league. The team's home-ground is the Newlands Cricket Ground. The team is coached by Robin Peterson. MI Cape Town is owned by Indiawin Sports.

== History ==
In August 2022, Cricket South Africa announced the establishment of the SA20, a Twenty20 Cricket competition to be started in 2023. The teams for the competition, representing six different cities, including Cape Town, were put up for auction in September 2022. The Cape Town franchise was purchased by Mumbai Indians, led by Reliance Industries.

=== 2023 season ===
In 2023, they recruited major overseas stars like Rashid Khan, Jofra Archer, Sam Curran and Liam Livingstone, along with big domestic names like Kagiso Rabada, Dewald Brevis (both pre-auction signings), and Rassie van der Dussen (acquired in the player auction) in their first season and had a promising start. By 6 games, they were with 3 wins and losses each, but went out to lose their next 4 games to finish at the bottom of the table with 7 losses and 3 wins. Van der Dussen finished as their leading run-getter, with 243 runs in 10 innings, while Rabada finished as their highest wicket-taker, with 11 wickets in 8 innings.

=== 2024 season ===
In 2024, in their next season, with Rashid and Archer injured, they brought Kieron Pollard from MI Emirates and appointed him as the captain for the season. They retained Jofra Archer, Sam Curran and Liam Livingstone. They also bought in the services of Sri-Lankan speedster Nuwan Thushara and English keeper-batter Chris Benjamin. Again after a decent start with 2 wins and losses apiece, they went on to lose 5 of their next 6 to again finish their campaign again at the bottom of the table with 7 losses and 3 wins, identical to their first season. Ryan Rickelton had a breakthrough season, finishing with 530 runs in 10 innings, while Rabada was once again their top wicket-taker with 9 in 10 innings.

=== 2025 season ===
In 2025, they overhauled their overseas recruitments by releasing everyone from the previous two seasons' contingent, except for Rashid, Thushara (injured and replaced by Matthew Potts), and Benjamin, while bringing Ben Stokes (injured and replaced by Sediqullah Atal), Trent Boult (from MI Emirates), and Azmatullah Omarzai on board. Rashid was again appointed as their captain. At the player auctions, they acquired the services of Reeza Hendricks, Colin Ingram, and Dane Piedt. They also brought Corbin Bosch as their wildcard pick. Again, they started strongly, defeating Sunrisers Eastern Cape for the first time. They then lost to Joburg Super Kings by 6 runs due to DLS, before winning and losing to Paarl Royals. But this time, they went on to win 5 out of their next 6 games with a bonus point, (with a washout against Durban's Super Giants) to finish at the top of the table and qualify for play-offs. They went on to win the tournament for the first time in their history.

== Support staff ==
| Name | Role |
|---|---|
| Robin Peterson | Head coach |
| Hashim Amla | Batting Coach |
| Mitchell McClenaghan | Bowling Coach |
| Kruger van Wyk | Fielding Coach |

== Statistics ==
=== Most runs ===
| Player | Runs | Batting average | High score | 100s | 50s |
|---|---|---|---|---|---|
| Ryan Rickelton | 1349 | 43.51 | 113* | 2 | 8 |
| Rassie van der Dussen | 1211 | 34.60 | 104 | 1 | 5 |
| Dewald Brevis | 676 | 29.39 | 73* | 0 | 4 |
| Reeza Hendricks | 461 | 41.90 | 77* | 0 | 4 |
| George Linde | 432 | 20.57 | 63* | 0 | 1 |

Source: as of 18 Jan 2026

=== Most wickets ===
| Player | Wickets | Bowling average | Best bowling |
|---|---|---|---|
| Kagiso Rabada | 41 | 23.58 | 4/25 |
| George Linde | 32 | 25.90 | 3/15 |
| Rashid Khan | 27 | 27.51 | 3/16 |
| Corbin Bosch | 24 | 19.00 | 4/19 |
| Trent Boult | 19 | 32.00 | 3/28 |
| Sam Curran | 14 | 38.07 | 3/26 |
| Olly Stone | 11 | 22.63 | 4/28 |

Source: as of 18 Jan 2026

== Seasons ==
=== Seasons ===
| Year | League standing | Final standing |
|---|---|---|
| 2023 | 6th out of 6 | League stage |
| 2024 | 6th out of 6 | League stage |
| 2025 | 1st out of 6 | Champions |
| 2026 | 6th out of 6 | League stage |

- C: champions
- RU: runner-up
- SF team qualified for the semi-final stage of the competition

=== Season summary ===
| Year | Played | Wins | Losses | Tied/NR |
|---|---|---|---|---|
| 2023 | 10 | 3 | 7 | 0 |
| 2024 | 10 | 3 | 7 | 0 |
| 2025 | 12 | 9 | 2 | 1 |
| 2026 | 10 | 3 | 6 | 1 |
Source: ESPNCricinfo

Note:

- NR indicates No result
- Abandoned matches are indicated as no result
