= Ryan Rickelton =

South African cricketer (born 1996)

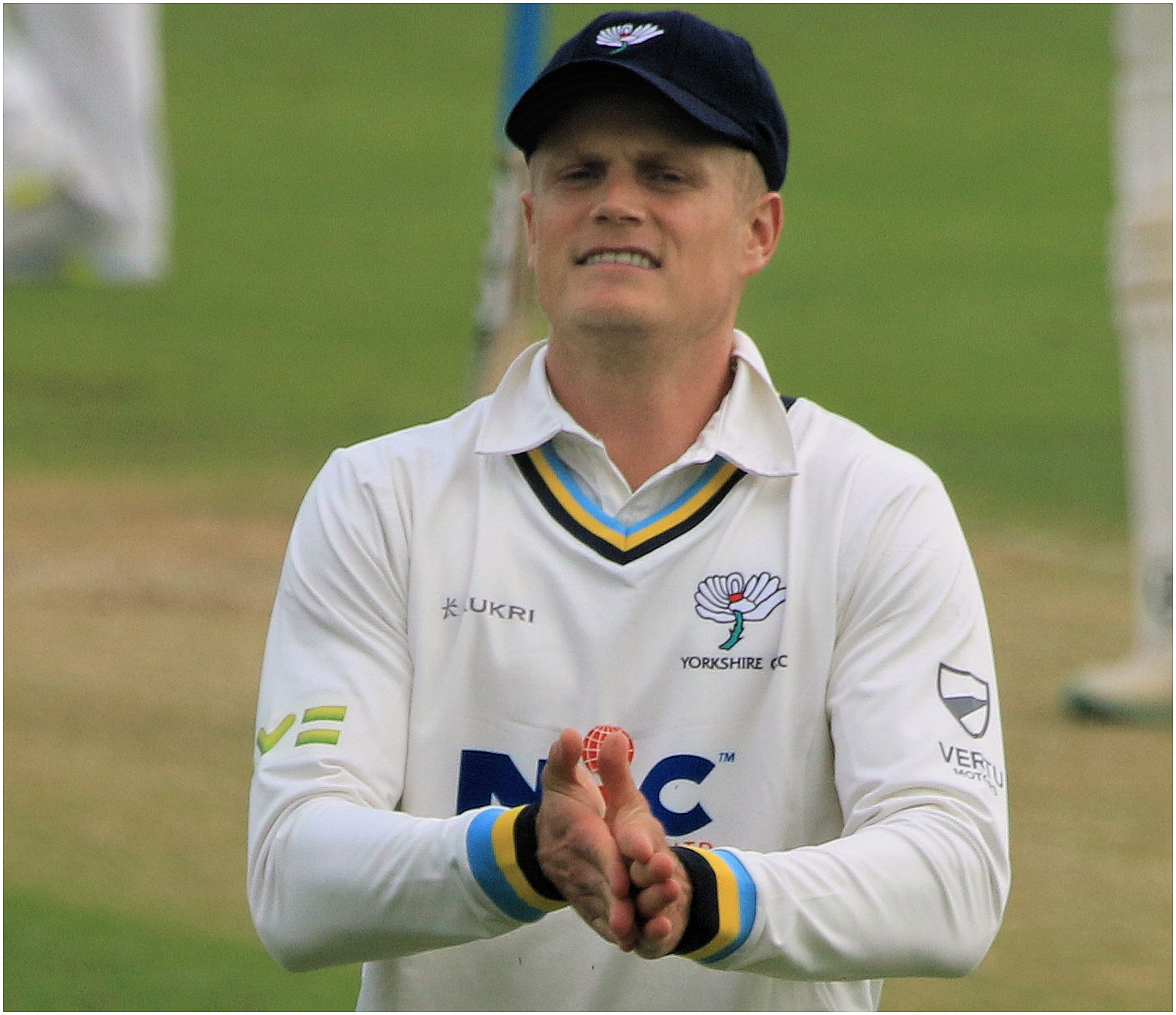
- Rickelton playing for Yorkshire in 2023

Personal information
- Full name: Ryan David Rickelton
- Born: 11 July 1996 (age 30); Johannesburg, Gauteng, South Africa
- Height: 5 ft 10 in (178 cm)
- Batting: Left-handed
- Bowling: Slow left-arm orthodox
- Role: Wicket-keeper, batter

International information
- National side: South Africa (2022—present)
- Test debut (cap 352): 31 March 2022 v Bangladesh
- Last Test: 22 October 2026 v Australia
- ODI debut (cap 147): 18 March 2023 v West Indies
- Last ODI: 30 September 2026 v Australia
- T20I debut (cap 103): 23 May 2024 v West Indies
- Last T20I: 4 March 2026 v New Zealand

Domestic team information
- Years: Team
- 2015/16–present: Gauteng
- 2017/18–2020/21: Lions
- 2018–2019: Jozi Stars
- 2022: Northamptonshire
- 2023–present: MI Cape Town
- 2023: Yorkshire
- 2025–present: Mumbai Indians
- 2026-present: Sunrisers Leeds

Career statistics
| Competition | Test | ODI | T20I | FC |
|---|---|---|---|---|
| Matches | 19 | 19 | 29 | 75 |
| Runs scored | 1,175 | 552 | 741 | 5,596 |
| Batting average | 39.16 | 32.47 | 28.50 | 49.52 |
| 100s/50s | 4/1 | 1/2 | 0/4 | 21/18 |
| Top score | 259 | 103 | 77* | 259 |
| Catches/stumpings | 20/1 | 18/6 | 14/– | 157/6 |
Medal record
Men's cricket
Representing South Africa
World Test Championship
| Winner | 2023–2025 |
T20 World Cup
| Runner-up | 2024 West Indies & USA |
- Source: ESPNcricinfo, 19 November 2026

Ryan David Rickelton (born 11 July 1996) is a South African international cricketer. He made his international debut for the South Africa cricket team on 31 March 2022. A left handed wicket-keeper batter, Rickelton represents Gauteng, and MI Cape Town at the domestic level. Rickelton was a member of the South African team which won the 2025 World Test Championship final, the second ICC title the country has won to date.

== Domestic career ==
He made his first-class debut for Gauteng against Northerns. In August 2017, he was named in Nelson Mandela Bay Stars' squad for the first season of the T20 Global League. He made his Twenty20 debut for Gauteng in the 2017 Africa T20 Cup on 1 September 2017. However, in October 2017, Cricket South Africa initially postponed the tournament until November 2018, with it being cancelled soon after.

He was the leading run-scorer in the 2017–18 CSA Provincial One-Day Challenge tournament for Gauteng, with 351 runs in eight matches. He was also the leading run-scorer in the 2017–18 Sunfoil 3-Day Cup for Gauteng, with 562 runs in six matches.

In June 2018, he was named in the squad for the Highveld Lions team for the 2018–19 season. The following month, he was named in the Cricket South Africa Emerging Squad. In October 2018, he was named in Jozi Stars' squad for the first edition of the Mzansi Super League T20 tournament. In September 2019, he was named in the squad for the Jozi Stars team for the 2019 Mzansi Super League tournament. Later the same month, he was named in Gauteng's squad for the 2019–20 CSA Provincial T20 Cup.

In February 2022, Rickelton was named as the captain of the Imperial Lions for the 2021–22 CSA T20 Challenge.

In 2022, Rickelton signed with Northamptonshire for that year's edition of the County Championship.

== International career ==
Rickelton playing for South Africa in 2026

In January 2021, he was named in South Africa's Twenty20 International (T20I) squad for their series against Pakistan. In April 2021, he was named in Gauteng's squad, ahead of the 2021–22 cricket season in South Africa. In May 2021, he was named in the South Africa A's squad to play against the Zimbabwe A cricket team for their tour to Zimbabwe. He scored 224 runs in the List A series including a century, being the highest run-scorer in the series.

Rickelton keeping in 2026

In November 2021, he was named in South Africa's One Day International (ODI) squad for their series against the Netherlands. The following month, Rickelton was named in South Africa's Test squad for the series against India. In January 2022, he received a further call-up to the Test team, for their tour of New Zealand. In March 2022, Rickleton was also named in South Africa's Test squad for their series against Bangladesh. He made his Test debut on 31 March 2022, for South Africa against Bangladesh. He made his ODI debut against the West Indies on 18 March 2023.

In May 2024, he was named in South Africa's squad for the 2024 ICC Men's T20 World Cup tournament.

Rickelton scored his first double century in Test cricket in the second of a home two match series against Pakistan in January 2025, making 259 at Newlands Cricket Ground.

In October 2026, during Australia's tour of South Africa, Rickelton kept wicket for the first time in Test matches. In the final test of the series, Rickelton scored his 3rd test century of 101*.

== International centuries ==
Test centuries by Ryan Rickelton
| No. | Runs | Balls | Innings | Against | Venue | Country | Date | Result |
|---|---|---|---|---|---|---|---|---|
| 1 | 101 | 250 | 1 | Sri Lanka | St George's Park, Gqeberha | South Africa | 5 December 2024 | South Africa won by 109 runs |
| 2 | 259 | 343 | 1 | Pakistan | Newlands Cricket Ground, Cape Town | South Africa | 3 January 2025 | South Africa won by 10 wickets |
| 3 | 101 | 219 | 3 | Australia | Newlands Cricket Ground, Cape Town | South Africa | 27 October 2026 | South Africa won by 176 runs |
| 4 | 102 | 165 | 2 | Bangladesh | Wanderers Stadium, Johannesburg | South Africa | 15 November 2026 | TBD |

ODI centuries by Ryan Rickelton
| No. | Runs | Balls | Innings | Against | Venue | Country | Date | Result |
|---|---|---|---|---|---|---|---|---|
| 1 | 103 | 106 | 1 | Afghanistan | National Stadium, Karachi, Karachi | Pakistan | 21 February 2025 | South Africa won by 107 runs |
