= 2024 SA20 final =

Final match of the SA20 2024

2024 SA20 Final
- Event: 2024 SA20
Sunrisers Eastern Cape	Durban's Super Giants
204/3	115
20 overs	17 overs
- Sunrisers Eastern Cape won by 89 runs
- Date: 10 February 2024
- Venue: Newlands Cricket Ground, Cape Town
- Player of the match: Tom Abell (Sunrisers Eastern Cape)
- Umpires: Lubabalo Gcuma and Stephen Harris

The 2024 SA20 Final was played on 10 February 2024 at the Newlands Cricket Ground in Cape Town. A capacity crowd of 25,000 attended the 2024 SA20 final. Sunrisers Eastern Cape qualified for the finals after their win in Qualifier 1. They competed with Durban's Super Giants, who won Qualifier 2.

Sunrisers Eastern Cape won the toss and elected to bat first. They made 204 runs off 3 wickets in their 20 overs. In response, Durban's Super Giants were dismissed in 17 overs for 115 to lose the match by 89 runs. It was Sunrisers Eastern Cape's second SA20 title. Tom Abell from Sunrisers Eastern Cape was named player of the match. Heinrich Klaasen from Durban's Super Giants was named player of the season.

== Background ==
15 August 2023, the CSA announced the schedule for the 2024 season of the SA20. 6 venues were scheduled to host the group stage. Newlands Cricket Ground in Cape Town was chosen to host qualifier 1 and the final whereas the Wanderers Stadium was chosen to host eliminator and qualifier 2. Sunrisers Eastern Cape and Durban's Super Giants played the final on 10 February 2024. The Eastern Cape won the match by 89 runs.

== Road to the final ==
Sunrisers Eastern Cape
vs
Durban's Super Giants
League stage
Opponent
Scorecard
Result
Points
Match No.
Opponent
Scorecard
Result
Points
Joburg Super Kings
10 January 2024
NR
2
1
MI Cape Town
11 January 2024
Won
4
Durban's Super Giants
13 January 2024
Lost
2
2
Sunrisers Eastern Cape
13 January 2024
Won
8
MI Cape Town
16 January 2024
Won
6
3
Joburg Super Kings
15 January 2024
Won
13
Durban's Super Giants
20 January 2024
Won
10
4
Pretoria Capitals
18 January 2024
Lost
13
Pretoria Capitals
22 January 2024
Won
15
5
Sunrisers Eastern Cape
10 January 2024
Lost
13
Pretoria Capitals
25 January 2024
Lost
15
6
MI Cape Town
23 January 2024
Won
18
MI Cape Town
27 January 2024
Won
19
7
Paarl Royals
26 January 2024
Won
23
Joburg Super Kings
31 January 2024
Won
24
8
Paarl Royals
28 January 2024
Won
28
Paarl Royals
2 February 2024
Won
29
9
Pretoria Capitals
30 January 2024
Won
32
Paarl Royals
4 February 2024
Won
33
10
Joburg Super Kings
3 February 2024
Lost
32
Playoff stage

Qualifier 1
6 February 2024 — Cape Town
1	Sunrisers Eastern Cape	157/8 (20 overs)
2	Durban's Super Giants	106 (19.3 overs)
Eliminator
7 February 2024 — Johannesburg
3	Paarl Royals	138 (18.5 overs)
4	Joburg Super Kings	139/1 (13.2 overs)

Qualifier 2
8 February 2024 — Johannesburg
Q1L	Durban's Super Giants	211/6 (20 overs)
EW	Joburg Super Kings	142 (17.4 overs)

Final
10 February 2024 — Cape Town
Q1W	Sunrisers Eastern Cape	204/3 (20 overs)
Q2W	Durban's Super Giants	115 (17 overs)

Opponent
Scorecard
Result

Opponent
Scorecard
Result
Durban's Super Giants
6 February 2024
Won
Q1
Sunrisers Eastern Cape
6 February 2024
Lost
Qualified for the finals
Q2
Joburg Super Kings
8 February 2024
Won
2024 SA20 final

Source: ESPNcricinfo

== Match ==
=== Match officials ===
- On-field umpires: Lubabalo Gcuma (SA) and Stephen Harris (SA)
- Third umpire: Arno Jacobs (SA)
- Reserve umpire: Abdoellah Steenkamp (SA)
- Match referee: Gerrie Pienaar (SA)
- Toss: Sunrisers Eastern Cape won the toss and elected to bat.

=== Summary ===
Final
10 February 2024
17:30 (D/N)
Scorecard

Sunrisers Eastern Cape; 204/3 (20 overs)	v	Durban's Super Giants; 115 (17 overs)
Tristan Stubbs 56* (30); Keshav Maharaj 2/33 (4 overs)		Wiaan Mulder 38 (22); Marco Jansen 5/30 (4 overs)

Sunrisers Eastern Cape won by 89 runs
Newlands Cricket Ground, Cape Town
Umpires: Lubabalo Gcuma and Stephen Harris
Player of the match: Tom Abell (Sunrisers Eastern Cape)

- Sunrisers Eastern Cape won the toss and elected to bat.

=== Sunrisers Eastern Cape innings ===
Sunrisers Eastern Cape (SEC) won the toss and elected to bat. They didn't have an early good start. Among the two openers, Dawid Malan got out leg before wicket by Reece Topley in the second over for only 6 runs. English batter Tom Abell and South African cricketer Jordan Hermann stabilized and built the innings. Hermann scored a 42 off 26 balls before caught to Heinrich Klaasen on Keshav Maharaj' bowling in the eleventh over. This brought skipper Aiden Markram to the crease, alongside Abell, who took control of the game. Abell scored a quick 55 of 34 balls including eight fours and two sixes before being clean bowled by spinner Maharaj. Tristan Stubbs joined skipper and bought the momentum of the game to Sunrisers side again. Skipper Markram and Stubbs made a huge partnership, and took the team to very high total remaining not out. Markram scored 42 off 26 balls including three fours and two sixes, while Stubbs scored amazing 56 of 30 balls wih 4 fours and three sixes

Keshav Maharaj and Reece Topley only player, who were able to take wickets. In which, Maharaj took 2 wickets for 33 runs, while Topley took 1 wicket for 32 runs. JJ Smuts, Naveen-ul-Haq, Wiaan Mulder, Junior Dala and Dwaine Pretorius, all of them were unabled to picke up a wicket.

=== Durban's Super Giants innings ===
Durban's Super Giants (DSG) had very bat start to the chase. Of the two openers, Quinton de Kock got clean bowled by Daniel Worrall in the third over for just 3 runs. JJ Smuts came to the crease alongside opener Matthew Breetzke, but got out for just 1 run to Marco Jansen's bowling. Sri Lankan batter Bhanuka Rajapaksa joined the crease but gout dismissed on duck. South African Wiaan Mulder joined Breetzke and tried to stabilized the innings, scoring 38 runs off 22 balls, but he too fell, being caught by Jansen off Simon Harmer's bowling in the tenth over. DSG's top order continued to falter, with Breetzke scoring 18 runs before being bowled off Ottneil Baartman bowling, leaving DSG at 63 for the loss of 5 wickets in the eleventh over. Heinrich Klaasen followed soon after, got out leg before wicket by Reece Topley on duck.

Dwaine Pretorius and Skipeer all-rounder Keshav Maharaj tried to stabilize the innings, scoring 28 runs off 17 balls and 5 runs off 7 balls respectively, but they too fell short, on Worrall bowlings and being bowled off by Marco Jansen's respectively. Junior Dala contributed 15 runs before falling to Jansen. Reece Topley did not add anything, being bowled off to Jansen and Naveen-ul-Haq, managed 3 runs off 5 balls remaining not out.

SEC's bowling attack was led by Marco Jansen, who claimed 5 wickets haul for 30 runs. Both Daniel Worrall and Ottneil Baartman took 2 wickets for 15 runs and 17 runs respectively. Simon Harmer took 1 wicket just 18 runs. Aiden Markram and Liam Dawson were unabled to picke up a wicket, conceding 4 runs and 30 runs respectively.

SEC ended with a decisive victory of 89 runs securing their SA20 consecutive second title.

=== Scorecard ===
Source: ESPNcricinfo

1st innings

Sunrisers Eastern Cape innings
Player	Status	Runs	Balls	4s	6s	Strike rate
Jordan Hermann	c Klaasen b Maharaj	42	26	4	1	161.53
Dawid Malan	lbw b Topley	6	4	1	0	150.00
Tom Abell	b Maharaj	55	34	8	2	161.76
Aiden Markram	not out	42	26	3	2	161.53
Tristan Stubbs	not out	56	30	4	3	186.66
Patrick Kruger						
Marco Jansen						
Liam Dawson						
Simon Harmer						
Daniel Worrall						
Ottneil Baartman						
Extras 3 (lb 2, w 1); Total 204/3 (20 overs)				20	8	10.20 RR

Fall of wickets: 15-1 (Dawid Malan, 1.4 ov), 105-2 (Jordan Hermann, 10.2 ov), 106-3 (Tom Abell, 10.5 ov)

Durban's Super Giants bowling
Bowler	Overs	Maidens	Runs	Wickets	Econ	Wides	NBs
JJ Smuts	2	0	13	0	6.50	0	1
Reece Topley	3	0	32	1	10.66	1	0
Naveen-ul-Haq	4	0	39	0	9.75	0	0
Wiaan Mulder	1	0	14	0	14.00	0	0
Keshav Maharaj	4	0	33	2	8.25	0	0
Junior Dala	4	0	48	0	12.00	0	0
Dwaine Pretorius	2	0	23	0	11.50	0	0

2nd innings

Durban's Super Giants innings
Player	Status	Runs	Balls	4s	6s	Strike rate
Quinton de Kock	b Worrall	3	7	0	0	42.85
Matthew Breetzke	b Baartman	18	27	1	0	66.66
JJ Smuts	c Kruger b Jansen	1	2	0	0	50.00
Bhanuka Rajapaksa	c Kruger b Jansen	0	3	0	0	0.00
Wiaan Mulder	c Jansen b Harmer	38	22	3	2	172.72
Heinrich Klaasen	lbw b Baartman	0	1	5	0	0.00
Dwaine Pretorius	c Kruger b Worrall	28	17	3	1	164.70
Keshav Maharaj	b Jansen	5	7	0	0	71.42
Junior Dala	c Harmer b Jansen	15	9	1	1	166.66
Naveen-ul-Haq	not out	3	5	0	0	60.00
Reece Topley	b Jansen	0	2	0	0	0.00
Extras 4 (lb 1, w 3); Total 115/10 (17 overs)				8	4	6.76 RR

Fall of wickets: 6-1 (Quinton de Kock, 2.2 ov), 7-2 (JJ Smuts, 3.1 ov), 7-3 (Bhanuka Rajapaksa, 3.4 ov), 63-4 (Wiaan Mulder, 9.6 ov), 63-5 (Matthew Breetzke, 10.1 ov), 69-6 (Heinrich Klaasen, 10.5 ov), 84-7 (Keshav Maharaj, 13.1 ov), 100-8 (Dwaine Pretorius, 14.6 ov), 115-9 (Junior Dala, 16.4 ov), 115-10 (Reece Topley, 16.6 ov)

Pretoria Capitals bowling
Bowler	Overs	Maidens	Runs	Wickets	Econ	Wides	NBs
Daniel Worrall	4	0	15	2	3.75	0	0
Aiden Markram	1	0	4	0	4.00	0	0
Marco Jansen	4	0	30	5	7.50	1	0
Liam Dawson	3	0	30	0	10.00	1	0
Simon Harmer	2	0	18	1	9.00	0	0
Ottneil Baartman	3	0	17	2	5.66	1	0
