= 2027 Sunrisers Eastern Cape season =

Sunrisers Eastern Cape season

Sunrisers Eastern Cape
2027 season
- Coach: Adrian Birrell
- Captain(s): Tristan Stubbs
- Home ground: St George's Park Cricket Ground
- League: SA20

The 2027 Sunrisers Eastern Cape season is the fifth season of the franchise in the SA20. The team is captained by Tristan Stubbs and coached by Adrian Birrell.

== Background ==
Following their third SA20 title in the 2026 SA20 season, Sunrisers Eastern Cape entered the 2027 season as the defending champions. During the off-season, the franchise retained Adrian Birrell as head coach while appointing Tristan Stubbs as captain following the departure of Aiden Markram. The core of the championship-winning squad was retained, with several domestic and overseas signings strengthening the team's roster ahead of the new campaign..

Ahead of the 2027 season, the league confirmed the tournament schedule, with Sunrisers Eastern Cape set to play their home matches at St George's Park Cricket Ground in Gqeberha. The franchise entered the season aiming to defend their title and become the first team in SA20 history to win four championships.

Retained players: Matthew Breetzke, James Coles (England), Quinton de Kock, Lewis Gregory (England), Jordan Hermann, Marco Jansen (Wildcard), CJ King - U23, JP King, Patrick Kruger, Adam Milne (New Zealand), Senuran Muthusamy, Anrich Nortje, Lutho Sipamla, Tristan Stubbs, Mitchell van Buuren

Pre-signings: Mitchell Marsh (Australia), Rishad Hossain (Bangladesh)

== Current squad ==
- Players with international caps are listed in **bold**.

Sunrisers Eastern Cape roster
Name	Nat.	Date of Birth	Batting Style	Bowling Style	Year signed	Notes
Batters
**Matthew Breetzke**	South Africa	November 3, 1998 (age 27)	Right-handed	Right-arm medium	2025	
Jordan Hermann	South Africa	May 10, 2001 (age 25)	Left-handed	Right-arm off break	2025	
Mitchell van Buuren	South Africa	September 7, 1998 (age 28)	Right-handed	Right-arm medium	2025	
James Coles	England	September 11, 2004 (age 22)	Left-handed	Slow left-arm orthodox	2025	
CJ King	South Africa				2025	
JP King	South Africa				2025	
All-rounders
**Marco Jansen**	South Africa	May 1, 2000 (age 26)	Left-handed	Left-arm fast	2023	
**Mitchell Marsh**	Australia	October 20, 1991 (age 34)	Right-handed	Right-arm fast-medium	2026	Pre-signing
Patrick Kruger	South Africa	February 3, 1995 (age 31)	Right-handed	Right-arm medium-fast	2025	
**Lewis Gregory**	England	May 24, 1992 (age 34)	Right-handed	Right-arm medium-fast	2025	
Senuran Muthusamy	South Africa	February 22, 1994 (age 32)	Left-handed	Slow left-arm orthodox	2025	
Wicket-keepers
**Tristan Stubbs**	South Africa	August 14, 2000 (age 26)	Right-handed	Right-arm off break	2025	Captain
**Quinton de Kock**	South Africa	December 17, 1992 (age 33)	Left-handed		2025	
Bowlers
**Adam Milne**	New Zealand	April 13, 1992 (age 34)	Right-handed	Right-arm fast	2025	
**Anrich Nortje**	South Africa	November 16, 1993 (age 32)	Right-handed	Right-arm fast	2025	
**Lutho Sipamla**	South Africa	May 12, 1998 (age 28)	Right-handed	Right-arm fast-medium	2025	
**Rishad Hossain**	Bangladesh	July 15, 2002 (age 24)	Right-handed	Right-arm leg break	2026	Pre-signing

== Fixtures ==
The full fixture list was released on 23 July 2026.

Match 1
17 January 2027
15:30 (D/N)
Scorecard

Sunrisers Eastern Cape (H)	v	Pretoria Capitals

St George's Park Cricket Ground, Gqeberha

Match 5
21 January 2027
17:30 (D/N)
Scorecard

Durban's Super Giants (H)	v	Sunrisers Eastern Cape

Kingsmead Cricket Ground, Durban

Match 8
23 January 2027
17:30 (D/N)
Scorecard

Joburg Super Kings (H)	v	Sunrisers Eastern Cape

Wanderers Stadium, Johannesburg

Match 10
26 January 2027
17:30 (D/N)
Scorecard

Pretoria Capitals (H)	v	Sunrisers Eastern Cape

Centurion Park, Centurion

Match 12
28 January 2027
17:30 (D/N)
Scorecard

Sunrisers Eastern Cape (H)	v	Joburg Super Kings

St George's Park Cricket Ground, Gqeberha

Match 14
30 January 2027
13:00
Scorecard

Sunrisers Eastern Cape (H)	v	MI Cape Town

St George's Park Cricket Ground, Gqeberha

Match 19
4 February 2027
17:30 (D/N)
Scorecard

MI Cape Town (H)	v	Sunrisers Eastern Cape

Newlands Cricket Ground, Cape Town

Match 22
6 February 2027
17:30 (D/N)
Scorecard

Paarl Royals (H)	v	Sunrisers Eastern Cape

Boland Park, Paarl

Match 24
9 February 2027
17:30 (D/N)
Scorecard

Sunrisers Eastern Cape (H)	v	Durban's Super Giants

St George's Park Cricket Ground, Gqeberha

Match 29
13 February 2027
17:30 (D/N)
Scorecard

Sunrisers Eastern Cape (H)	v	Paarl Royals

St George's Park Cricket Ground, Gqeberha

== Standing ==
=== Points table ===
Pos	Team	Pld	W	L	NR	BP	Pts	NRR	Qualification
1	Durban's Super Giants	0	0	0	0	0	0	—	Advance to Qualifier 1
2	Joburg Super Kings	0	0	0	0	0	0	—	Advance to Qualifier 1
3	MI Cape Town	0	0	0	0	0	0	—	Advance to Eliminator
4	Pretoria Capitals	0	0	0	0	0	0	—	Advance to Eliminator
5	Paarl Royals	0	0	0	0	0	0	—	
6	Sunrisers Eastern Cape	0	0	0	0	0	0	—	

First match(es) will be played: 17 January 2027. Source: Cricinfo
- Points – Win 4, No Result 2. One additional point is awarded for a win when the run rate difference is 1.25 greater than the opposing side's.

=== Match summary ===
Team	League matches										Finals		
Team	1	2	3	4	5	6	7	8	9	10	QF/KO	Ch	F
Sunrisers Eastern Cape													

Win	Loss	Tie	No result

== Administration and support staff ==
Sunrisers Eastern Cape staff
Position	Name
Head Coach	Adrian Birrell
Assistant Coach	Russell Domingo
Batting Coach	Baakier Abrahams
Bowling Coach	Charl Langeveldt
Fielding Coach	Jimmy Kgamadi
