= 2023 SA20 final =

Final match of SA20 2023

- Event: 2023 SA20
| Pretoria Capitals | Sunrisers Eastern Cape |
| 135/10 | 137/6 |
| 19.3 overs | 16.2 overs |
- Sunrisers Eastern Cape won by 5 wickets
- Date: 12 February 2023
- Venue: Wanderers Stadium, Johannesburg
- Player of the match: Roelof van der Merwe (SEC)
- Umpires: Marais Erasmus (SA); Adrian Holdstock (SA)
- Attendance: 22,010

The 2023 SA20 final was played on 12 February 2023 at the Wanderers Stadium in Johannesburg. It was a Day/Night Twenty20 match that would decide the winner of the 2023 season of the SA20, an annual Twenty20 tournament in South Africa.

The match was originally scheduled to be played on 11 February, but was postponed to 12 February due to rain—marking the first time the SA20 final had been postponed due to weather conditions. After winning the toss, Sunrisers Eastern Cape elected to field, with Pretoria Capitals scoring 135 runs for 10 wickets. The Eastern Cape' ultimately win by four wickets, securing their first SA20 title. SEC player Roelof van der Merwe was named player of the match.

== Background ==
On 7 November 2022, the CSA announced the schedule for the 2023 season of the SA20. 6 venues were scheduled to host the group stage. Wanderers Stadium in Johannesburg was chosen to host semi-final 1 and the final whereas the Centurion Park was chosen to host semi-final 2. Sunrisers Eastern Cape and Pretoria Capitals played the final on 12 February 2023. The Eastern Cape won the match by four wickets.

== Road to the final ==
Pretoria Capitals
vs
Sunrisers Eastern Cape
League stage
Opponent
Scorecard
Result
Points
Match No.
Opponent
Scorecard
Result
Points
Sunrisers Eastern Cape
12 January 2023
Won
4
1
Pretoria Capitals
12 January 2023
Lost
0
Sunrisers Eastern Cape
14 January 2023
Won
8
2
Pretoria Capitals
14 January 2023
Lost
0
Joburg Super Kings
17 January 2023
Lost
8
3
MI Cape Town
16 January 2023
Won
4
Joburg Super Kings
18 January 2023
Won
13
4
MI Cape Town
18 January 2023
Won
8
Durban's Super Giants
20 January 2023
Won
18
5
Paarl Royals
19 January 2023
Won
12
Paarl Royals
12 January 2023
Lost
18
6
Joburg Super Kings
21 January 2023
Lost
12
MI Cape Town
23 January 2023
Won
23
7
Durban's Super Giants
22 January 2023
Won
17
MI Cape Town
4 February 2023
Won
27
8
Paarl Royals
24 January 2023
Lost
17
Durban's Super Giants
5 February 2023
Lost
27
9
Durban's Super Giants
3 February 2023
NR
19
Paarl Royals
7 February 2023
Won
32
10
Joburg Super Kings
5 February 2023
Lost
19
Playoff stage

Semi-finals
1 | Pretoria Capitals | 153/8 (20 overs)
4 | Paarl Royals | 124 (19 overs)
2 | Joburg Super Kings | 199/6 (20 overs)
3 | Sunrisers Eastern Cape | 213/5 (20 overs)

Final
1 | Pretoria Capitals | 135 (19.3 overs)
3 | Sunrisers Eastern Cape | 137/6 (16.2 overs)

Opponent
Scorecard
Result

Opponent
Scorecard
Result
Paarl Royals
8 February 2023
Won
SF
Joburg Super Kings
9 February 2023
Won
2023 SA20 final

Source: ESPNcricinfo

== Match ==
=== Match officials ===
- On-field umpires: Marais Erasmus (SA) and Adrian Holdstock (SA)
- Third umpire: Bongani Jele (SA)
- Reserve umpire: Allahudien Paleker (SA)
- Match referee: Gerrie Pienaar (SA)
- Toss: Sunrisers Eastern Cape won the toss and elected to field.

=== Summary ===
12 February 2023
13:30
Scorecard

| Pretoria Capitals; 135 (19.3 overs) | v | Sunrisers Eastern Cape; 137/6 (16.2 overs) |
| Kusal Mendis 21 (19); Roelof van der Merwe 4/31 (4 overs) | | Adam Rossington 57 (30); Anrich Nortje 2/21 (4 overs) |

Sunrisers Eastern Cape won by 4 wickets
Wanderers Stadium, Johannesburg
Attendance: 22,010
Umpires: Marais Erasmus and Adrian Holdstock
Player of the match: Roelof van der Merwe (Sunrisers Eastern Cape)

- Sunrisers Eastern Cape won the toss and elected to field.
- The final was originally scheduled to take place on 11 February at 17:30 but was postponed due to rain.

=== Pretoria Capitals innings ===
Pretoria Capitals (PC) had early good start. Both opening batters, Phil Salt and Kusal Mendis smashed bolwer till first 3 overs. Kusal Mendis was the first to fall, bowled by South African fast bowler Ottniel Baartman for 21 runs in the fourth over. English batter Phil Salt followed soon after, clean bowled for just 8 runs off Left-arm spiner Roelof van der Merwe's bowling. South African Rilee Rossouw tried to stabilize the innings, scoring 19 runs off 11 balls, but he too fell, being caught by Brydon Carse off Sisanda Magala's bowling in the seventh over. PC's top order continued to falter, with Theunis de Bruyn scoring 11 runs before being bowled off van der Merwe's bowling, leaving PC at 66 for the loss of 4 wickets in the eight over.

Colin Ingram and Kiwi' all-rounder James Neesham tried to stabilize the innings, scoring 17 runs off 25 balls and 19 runs off 21 balls respectively, but they too fell short, being bowled off by Aiden Markram's and Baartman bowling respectively. Eathan Bosch contributed 15 runs before falling to van der Merwe, while Captain Wayne Parnell added 8 runs before being dismissed by Magala. Adil Rashid, managed 3 runs off 4 balls, but his effort was cut short when he was dismissed by Marco Jansen. Migael Pretorius did not add anything, being bowled off to van der Merwe and Anrich Nortje remaining not out on 5 with one four.

SEC's bowling attack was led by Roelof van der Merwe, who claimed 4 wickets for 31 runs. Both Ottneil Baartman and Sisanda Magala took 2 wickets for 22 runs and 30 runs respectively. Aiden Markram took 1 wicket for just 17 runs with lowest economy, while Marco Jansen matched Markram with 1 wickets for 22 runs. Brydon Carse unabled to picke up a wicket, conceding 10 runs. PC's innings included 9 extras, with their overall run rate of 6.92 at the end.

=== Sunrisers Eastern Cape innings ===
Sunrisers Eastern Cape (SEC) won the toss and elected to field. They didn't have a good start to the chase. Of the two openers, Temba Bavuma got clean bowled to Eathan Bosch on the second ball of the second over for only 2 runs. English batter Adam Rossington and South African cricketer Jordan Hermann stabilized the innings. Hermann scored a 22 off 17 balls before being stumped by Phil Salt off Adil Rashid' bowling in the seventh over. This brought skipper Aiden Markram to the crease, alongside opener Rossington, who took control of the chase. Rossington scored a quick 57 of 30 balls including four fours and five sixes before being dismissed by pacer Anrich Nortje, and bought the momentum of the game to Sunrisers side. Tristan Stubbs joined skipper. Skipper Markram scored 26 off 19 balls, before being caught part timer Colin Ingram's bowling. Later, Jordan Cox and Stubbs tried to stabilize the innings but unable to stood on crease as they were dismissed cheaply by Neesham and Nortje respectively. Marco Jansen continued his innings after the loss of Stubbs, reaching 13 off 11 balls. Brydon Carse , joined him at the crease, helping reach the target with 3.4 overs to spare.

South African player Anrich Nortje were only able to take 2 wickets for 21 runs, while Eathan Bosch, Adil Rashid, Colin Ingram and James Neesham were managed to pick up 1 wicket only. Wayne Parnell and Migael Pretorius were unabled to picke up a wicket, conceding 9 runs and 33 runs respectively.

SEC ended with a decisive victory by 4 wickets securing their first SA20 title.

=== Scorecard ===
Source: ESPNcricinfo

1st innings

Pretoria Capitals innings
| Player | Status | Runs | Balls | 4s | 6s | Strike rate |
|---|---|---|---|---|---|---|
| Phil Salt | b van der Merwe | 8 | 7 | 1 | 0 | 114.28 |
| Kusal Mendis | c Markram b Baartman | 21 | 19 | 1 | 1 | 110.52 |
| Theunis de Bruyn | b van der Merwe | 11 | 8 | 2 | 0 | 137.50 |
| Rilee Rossouw | c Carse b Magala | 19 | 11 | 4 | 0 | 172.72 |
| Colin Ingram | b Markram | 17 | 25 | 1 | 0 | 68.57 |
| James Neesham | c †Rossington b Baartman | 19 | 21 | 2 | 0 | 90.47 |
| Eathan Bosch | st †Rossington b van der Merwe | 15 | 13 | 2 | 0 | 115.38 |
| Wayne Parnell | c †Rossington b Magala | 8 | 5 | 0 | 1 | 160.00 |
| Migael Pretorius | b van der Merwe | 0 | 1 | 0 | 0 | 0.00 |
| Adil Rashid | c †Rossington b Jansen | 3 | 4 | 0 | 0 | 75.00 |
| Anrich Nortje | not out | 5 | 4 | 1 | 0 | 125.00 |
| Extras 9 (nb 1, lb 3, w 5); Total 135/10 (19.3 overs) | | | | 13 | 2 | 6.92 RR |

Fall of wickets: 33-1 (Kusal Mendis, 3.6 ov), 33-2 (Phil Salt, 4.1 ov), 64-3 (Rilee Rossouw, 6.6 ov), 66-4 (Theunis de Bruyn, 7.3 ov), 101-5 (Colin Ingram, 14.3 ov), 113-6 (James Neesham, 16.2 ov), 127-7 (Eathan Bosch, 17.5 ov), 127-8 (Migael Pretorius, 17.6 ov), 127-9 (Wayne Parnell, 18.1 ov), 135-10 (Adil Rashid, 19.3 ov)

Sunrisers Eastern Cape bowling
| Bowler | Overs | Maidens | Runs | Wickets | Econ | Wides | NBs |
|---|---|---|---|---|---|---|---|
| Sisanda Magala | 3 | 0 | 30 | 2 | 10.00 | 1 | 1 |
| Marco Jansen | 3.3 | 0 | 22 | 1 | 6.28 | 2 | 0 |
| Roelof van der Merwe | 4 | 0 | 31 | 4 | 7.75 | 0 | 0 |
| Ottneil Baartman | 3 | 0 | 22 | 2 | 7.33 | 1 | 0 |
| Aiden Markram | 4 | 0 | 17 | 1 | 4.25 | 0 | 0 |
| Brydon Carse | 2 | 0 | 10 | 0 | 5.00 | 1 | 0 |

2nd innings

Sunrisers Eastern Cape innings
| Player | Status | Runs | Balls | 4s | 6s | Strike rate |
|---|---|---|---|---|---|---|
| Adam Rossington | c †Salt b Nortje | 57 | 30 | 4 | 5 | 190.00 |
| Temba Bavuma | b Bosch | 2 | 2 | 0 | 0 | 100.00 |
| Jordan Hermann | st †Salt b Rashid | 22 | 17 | 5 | 0 | 129.41 |
| Aiden Markram | c Rossouw b Ingram | 26 | 19 | 2 | 1 | 136.84 |
| Tristan Stubbs | c Neesham b Nortje | 5 | 12 | 0 | 0 | 41.66 |
| Jordan Cox | c †Salt b Neesham | 7 | 5 | 1 | 0 | 140.00 |
| Marco Jansen | not out | 13 | 11 | 1 | 1 | 118.18 |
| Brydon Carse | not out | 0 | 3 | 0 | 0 | 0.00 |
| Roelof van der Merwe | | | | | | |
| Sisanda Magala | | | | | | |
| Ottneil Baartman | | | | | | |
| Extras 5 (lb 1, nb 1, w 3); Total 137/6 (16.2 overs) | | | | 13 | 7 | 8.38 RR |

Fall of wickets: 11-1 (Temba Bavuma, 1.2 ov), 78-2 (Jordan Hermann, 6.4 ov), 103-3 (Adam Rossington, 10.1 ov), 113-4 (Aiden Markram, 12.3 ov), 121-5 (Jordan Cox, 13.2 ov), 126-6 (Tristan Stubbs, 15.3 ov)

Pretoria Capitals bowling
| Bowler | Overs | Maidens | Runs | Wickets | Econ | Wides | NBs |
|---|---|---|---|---|---|---|---|
| Wayne Parnell | 1 | 0 | 9 | 0 | 9.00 | 1 | 0 |
| Eathan Bosch | 2 | 0 | 30 | 1 | 15.00 | 0 | 0 |
| Migael Pretorius | 2 | 0 | 33 | 0 | 16.50 | 1 | 1 |
| Anrich Nortje | 2 | 0 | 21 | 0 | 5.25 | 0 | 0 |
| Adil Rashid | 4 | 0 | 13 | 1 | 3.25 | 0 | 0 |
| Colin Ingram | 2 | 0 | 16 | 1 | 8.00 | 0 | 0 |
| James Neesham | 1.2 | 0 | 14 | 1 | 10.50 | 1 | 0 |
