= List of SA20 records and statistics =

The SA20 is a men's Twenty20 cricket competition, organised by Cricket South Africa (CSA), the national governing body of Cricket in South Africa. The inaugural season was in 2023, with six teams competing for the title.

== Listing criteria ==
The top five teams or individuals are listed in each category, except when there is a tie for the last place among the five, in which case all the tied record holders are noted.

== Listing notation ==
Team notation

- (200/3) indicates that a team scored 200 runs for three wickets and the innings was closed, either due to a successful run chase or if no playing time remained
- (200) indicates that a team scored 200 runs and was all out

Batting notation

- (100) indicates that a batsman scored 100 runs and was out
- (100*) indicates that a batsman scored 100 runs and was not out

Bowling notation

- (5/20) indicates that a bowler has captured five wickets while conceding 20 runs

Date

- indicates the date the match was played

== Team records ==
=== Greatest win margin (by runs) ===
Margin	Team	Opposition	Venue	Date
151 runs	Durban's Super Giants	Pretoria Capitals	Centurion Park, Centurion	5 February 2023
137 runs	Sunrisers Eastern Cape	Paarl Royals	Boland Park, Paarl	27 December 2025
125 runs	Durban's Super Giants	Paarl Royals	Kingsmead Cricket Ground, Durban	28 January 2024
124 runs	Sunrisers Eastern Cape	Durban's Super Giants	St George's Park Cricket Ground, Gqeberha	22 January 2023
98 runs	MI Cape Town	Joburg Super Kings	Wanderers Stadium, Johannesburg	13 January 2023

As of 25 January 2026

=== Greatest win margin (by balls remaining) ===
Balls remaining	Margin	Team	Opposition	Venue	Date
79	9 wickets	Sunrisers Eastern Cape	Pretoria Capitals	St George's Park Cricket Ground, Gqeberha	22 January 2024
74	8 wickets	Pretoria Capitals	Durban's Super Giants	Kingsmead Cricket Ground, Durban	20 January 2023
57	7 wickets	Paarl Royals	Joburg Super Kings	Boland Park, Paarl	13 January 2023
54	9 wickets	Sunrisers Eastern Cape	Joburg Super Kings	Wanderers Stadium, Johannesburg	31 January 2024
54	10 wickets	MI Cape Town	Sunrisers Eastern Cape	Newlands Cricket Ground, Cape Town	29 January 2025

As of 25 January 2026

=== Highest team totals ===
Score	Team	Opponent	Venue	Date
254/4	Durban's Super Giants	Pretoria Capitals	Centurion Park, Centurion	5 February 2023
248/4	MI Cape Town	Pretoria Capitals	Centurion Park, Centurion	1 February 2024
243/5	MI Cape Town	Joburg Super Kings	Wanderers Stadium, Johannesburg	13 January 2024
234/3	MI Cape Town	Joburg Super Kings	Wanderers Stadium, Johannesburg	10 January 2026
232/5	Durban's Super Giants	MI Cape Town	Newlands Cricket Ground, Cape Town	26 December 2025

As of 25 January 2026

=== Lowest team totals ===
Score	Team	Opponent	Venue	Date
49	Paarl Royals	Sunrisers Eastern Cape	Boland Park, Paarl	27 December 2025
52	Pretoria Capitals	Sunrisers Eastern Cape	St George's Park Cricket Ground, Gqeberha	22 January 2024
77	Sunrisers Eastern Cape	MI Cape Town	St George's Park Cricket Ground, Gqeberha	9 January 2025
78	Joburg Super Kings	Sunrisers Eastern Cape	Wanderers Stadium, Johannesburg	31 January 2024
80	Durban's Super Giants	Pretoria Capitals	Kingsmead Cricket Ground, Durban	20 January 2023

As of 25 January 2026

== Individual batting records ==
=== Most runs ===
Runs	Player	Team	Seasons
1,349	Ryan Rickelton	MI Cape Town	2023–2026
1,276	Aiden Markram	Sunrisers Eastern Cape; Durban's Super Giants	2023–2026
1,211	Rassie van der Dussen	MI Cape Town	2023–2026
1,146	Heinrich Klaasen	Durban's Super Giants	2023–2026
1,046	Dewald Brevis	MI Cape Town; Pretoria Capitals	2023–2026

As of 25 January 2026

=== Highest individual score ===
Score	Player	Team	Opponent	Venue	Date
118*	Shai Hope	Pretoria Capitals	Durban's Super Giants	Kingsmead Cricket Ground, Durban	7 January 2026
116*	Kyle Verreynne	Pretoria Capitals	MI Cape Town	Centurion Park, Centurion	1 February 2024
113*	Faf du Plessis	Joburg Super Kings	Durban's Super Giants	Wanderers Stadium, Johannesburg	24 January 2023
113*	Ryan Rickelton	MI Cape Town	Joburg Super Kings	Wanderers Stadium, Johannesburg	10 January 2026
113	Ryan Rickelton	MI Cape Town	Durban's Super Giants	Newlands Cricket Ground, Cape Town	26 December 2025

As of 25 January 2026

=== Most runs in a season ===
Runs	Batsman	Team	Innings	H.S.	Season
530	Ryan Rickelton	MI Cape Town	10	98	2024
447	Heinrich Klaasen	Durban's Super Giants	13	85	2024
416	Matthew Breetzke	Durban's Super Giants	13	78	2024
408	Jos Buttler	Paarl Royals	11	70*	2024
397	Lhuan-dre Pretorius	Paarl Royals	12	97	2025

As of 25 January 2026

== Individual bowling records ==
=== Most wickets ===
Bowler	Team	Wickets	Seasons
Ottneil Baartman	Sunrisers Eastern Cape; Paarl Royals	61	2023–2026
Marco Jansen	Sunrisers Eastern Cape	60	2023–2026
Kagiso Rabada	MI Cape Town	41	2023–2026
Bjorn Fortuin	Paarl Royals	39	2023–2026
Keshav Maharaj	Durban's Super Giants; Pretoria Capitals	39	2023–2026

As of 25 January 2026

=== Most wickets in a season ===
Bowler	Team	Wickets	Seasons
Roelof van der Merwe	Sunrisers Eastern Cape	20	2023
Anrich Nortje	Pretoria Capitals	20	2023
Marco Jansen	Sunrisers Eastern Cape	20	2024
Ottniel Baartman	Paarl Royals	20	2026
Marco Jansen	Sunrisers Eastern Cape	19	2025

As of 25 January 2026
