= Bangladeshi cricket team in South Africa in 2017–18 =

International cricket tour

| | South Africa | Bangladesh |
- Dates: 21 September – 29 October 2017
| Captains | Faf du Plessis (Tests, ODIs); JP Duminy (T20Is) | Mushfiqur Rahim (Tests); Mashrafe Mortaza (ODIs); Shakib Al Hasan (T20Is) |

Test series
- Result: South Africa won the 2-match series 2–0
| Most runs | Dean Elgar (330) | Mahmudullah (122) |
| Most wickets | Kagiso Rabada (15) | Mominul Haque (3); Subashis Roy (3); Mustafizur Rahman (3) |
- Player of the series: Dean Elgar (SA)

One Day International series
- Results: South Africa won the 3-match series 3–0
| Most runs | Quinton de Kock (287) | Mushfiqur Rahim (178) |
| Most wickets | Imran Tahir (6) | Rubel Hossain (5) |
- Player of the series: Quinton de Kock (SA)

Twenty20 International series
- Results: South Africa won the 2-match series 2–0
| Most runs | David Miller (126) | Soumya Sarkar (91) |
| Most wickets | Robert Frylinck (3); Andile Phehlukwayo (3); Aaron Phangiso (3); Beuran Hendricks (3) | Shakib Al Hasan (3) |
- Player of the series: David Miller (SA)

The Bangladesh cricket team toured South Africa in September and October 2017 to play two Tests, three One Day Internationals (ODIs) and two Twenty20 International (T20I) matches. It was Bangladesh's first tour of South Africa in nine years. Ahead of the series, Faf du Plessis was appointed captain of South Africa's ODI side, replacing AB de Villiers, therefore captaining South Africa in all three formats. However, du Plessis suffered an injury during the third ODI ruling him out of the T20I series, with JP Duminy replacing him as captain.

South Africa won the Test series 2–0, the ODI series 3–0 and the T20I series 2–0.

== Squads ==
| Tests | | ODIs | | T20Is | |
| South Africa | Bangladesh | South Africa | Bangladesh | South Africa | Bangladesh |
|---|---|---|---|---|---|
| Faf du Plessis (c); Hashim Amla; Temba Bavuma; Theunis de Bruyn; Quinton de Kock (wk); Dean Elgar; Keshav Maharaj; Aiden Markram; Morné Morkel; Duanne Olivier; Wayne Parnell; Dane Paterson; Andile Phehlukwayo; Kagiso Rabada | Mushfiqur Rahim (c, wk); Taskin Ahmed; Litton Das; Mominul Haque; Mehedi Hasan; Rubel Hossain; Tamim Iqbal; Shafiul Islam; Taijul Islam; Imrul Kayes; Mahmudullah; Mustafizur Rahman; Sabbir Rahman; Subashis Roy; Soumya Sarkar | Faf du Plessis (c); Hashim Amla; Temba Bavuma; Farhaan Behardien; Quinton de Kock (wk); AB de Villiers; JP Duminy; Aiden Markram; David Miller; Wiaan Mulder; Wayne Parnell; Dane Paterson; Andile Phehlukwayo; Dwaine Pretorius; Kagiso Rabada; Imran Tahir | Mashrafe Mortaza (c); Taskin Ahmed; Litton Das (wk); Shakib Al Hasan; Mehedi Hasan; Nasir Hossain; Rubel Hossain; Tamim Iqbal; Shafiul Islam; Imrul Kayes; Mahmudullah; Mustafizur Rahman; Sabbir Rahman; Mushfiqur Rahim; Mohammad Saifuddin; Soumya Sarkar | JP Duminy (c); ~~Faf du Plessis~~ (c); Hashim Amla; Farhaan Behardien; Quinton de Kock (wk); AB de Villiers; Robert Frylinck; Beuran Hendricks; David Miller; Mangaliso Mosehle; Dane Paterson; Aaron Phangiso; Andile Phehlukwayo; Dwaine Pretorius; Tabraiz Shamsi | Shakib Al Hasan (c); Taskin Ahmed; Litton Das (wk); Mominul Haque; Mehedi Hasan; Nasir Hossain; Rubel Hossain; Shafiul Islam; Imrul Kayes; Mahmudullah; Mushfiqur Rahim; Sabbir Rahman; Mohammad Saifuddin; Soumya Sarkar |

Morné Morkel was ruled out of South Africa's squad for the second Test with a side strain. Dane Paterson was added to the squad as his replacement. Bangladesh's Tamim Iqbal was also ruled out of the second Test due to injury.

Wayne Parnell was ruled out of the last two ODIs due to injury and was replaced by Wiaan Mulder in South Africa's squad. Shafiul Islam was added to Bangladesh's ODI squad as cover for Mustafizur Rahman. For the final ODI, Hashim Amla was rested with Aiden Markram added to South Africa's squad as his replacement. Tamim Iqbal aggravating an existing thigh injury during the second ODI and was ruled out of the rest of the tour.

Faf du Plessis injured himself during the third ODI and was ruled out of the T20I series as a result. JP Duminy replaced him as captain and Dwaine Pretorius was added to South Africa's T20I squad.

== Tour matches ==
=== Three-day match: Cricket South Africa Invitation XI v Bangladesh ===
21–23 September 2017
Scorecard

| Bangladesh | v | Cricket South Africa Invitation XI |
| 306/7d (74.1 overs); Mominul Haque 68 (117); Michael Cohen 4/23 (11 overs) | | 313/8d (91 overs); Shaun von Berg 62 (110); Shafiul Islam 2/61 (12 overs) |
| 235/9d (63 overs); Sabbir Rahman 67 (98); Shaun von Berg 4/77 (25 overs) |

Match drawn
Willowmoore Park, Benoni
Umpires: Shaun George (SA) and Adrian Holdstock (SA)

- Bangladesh won the toss and elected to bat.

=== One-day match: Cricket South Africa Invitation XI v Bangladesh ===
12 October 2017
Scorecard

| Bangladesh; 255 (48.1 overs) | v | Cricket South Africa Invitation XI; 257/4 (46.3 overs) |
| Shakib Al Hasan 68 (67); Robert Frylinck 2/25 (6 overs) | | Aiden Markram 82 (68); Mahmudullah 2/13 (4 overs) |

Cricket South Africa Invitation XI won by 6 wickets
Mangaung Oval, Bloemfontein
Umpires: Shaun George (SA) and Bongani Jele (SA)

- Bangladesh won the toss and elected to bat.
- 12 players per side (11 batting, 11 fielding).

== Test series ==
=== 1st Test ===
28 September–2 October 2017
Scorecard

| South Africa | v | Bangladesh |
| 496/3d (146 overs); Dean Elgar 199 (388); Shafiul Islam 1/74 (25 overs) | | 320 (89.1 overs); Mominul Haque 77 (150); Keshav Maharaj 3/92 (27.1 overs) |
| 247/6d (56 overs); Faf du Plessis 81 (101); Mominul Haque 3/27 (6 overs) | | 90 (32.4 overs); Imrul Kayes 32 (42); Keshav Maharaj 4/25 (10.4 overs) |

South Africa won by 333 runs
Senwes Park, Potchefstroom
Umpires: Chris Gaffaney (NZ) and Bruce Oxenford (Aus)
Player of the match: Dean Elgar (SA)

- Bangladesh won the toss and elected to field.
- No play was possible after tea on day 4 due to rain.
- Aiden Markram and Andile Phehlukwayo (SA) both made their Test debuts.
- Keshav Maharaj (SA) took his 50th wicket in Tests.

=== 2nd Test ===
6–10 October 2017 (Note: While five days of play were scheduled for each Test, the second Test reached a result within three days.)
Scorecard

| South Africa | v | Bangladesh |
| 573/4d (120 overs); Aiden Markram 143 (186); Subashis Roy 3/118 (29 overs) | | 147 (42.5 overs); Litton Das 70 (77); Kagiso Rabada 5/33 (13.5 overs) |
| | | 172 (42.4 overs) (f/o); Mahmudullah 43 (59); Kagiso Rabada 5/30 (11 overs) |

South Africa won by an innings and 254 runs
Mangaung Oval, Bloemfontein
Umpires: Kumar Dharmasena (SL) and Bruce Oxenford (Aus)
Player of the match: Kagiso Rabada (SA)

- Bangladesh won the toss and elected to field.
- Dean Elgar (SA) became the first batsman to score 1,000 runs in Tests in 2017.
- Aiden Markram (SA) scored his first century in Tests.
- Kagiso Rabada (SA) took his 100 wicket in Tests.
- This was South Africa's biggest win in Tests and was Bangladesh's biggest defeat by an innings in Tests against South Africa.

== ODI series ==
=== 1st ODI ===
15 October 2017
10:00
Scorecard

| Bangladesh; 278/7 (50 overs) | v | South Africa; 282/0 (42.5 overs) |
| Mushfiqur Rahim 110* (116); Kagiso Rabada 4/43 (10 overs) | | Quinton de Kock 168* (145) |

South Africa won by 10 wickets
De Beers Diamond Oval, Kimberley
Umpires: Aleem Dar (Pak) and Bongani Jele (SA)
Player of the match: Quinton de Kock (SA)

- Bangladesh won the toss and elected to bat.
- Dane Paterson (SA) and Mohammad Saifuddin (Ban) both made their ODI debuts.
- David Miller (SA) played in his 100th ODI.
- Shakib Al Hasan (Ban) became the fastest player to score 5,000 runs and take 200 wickets in ODIs.
- Mushfiqur Rahim became the first batsman for Bangladesh to score an international century against South Africa in any format.
- This was Bangladesh's highest ODI total against South Africa.
- Quinton de Kock and Hashim Amla set a new record for the highest partnership for any wicket for South Africa in ODIs.
- This was the highest target successfully chased down without losing a wicket in ODIs.

=== 2nd ODI ===
18 October 2017
10:00
Scorecard

| South Africa; 353/6 (50 overs) | v | Bangladesh; 249 (47.5 overs) |
| AB de Villiers 176 (104); Rubel Hossain 4/62 (10 overs) | | Imrul Kayes 68 (77); Andile Phehlukwayo 4/40 (10 overs) |

South Africa won by 104 runs
Boland Bank Park, Paarl
Umpires: Adrian Holdstock (SA) and Ruchira Palliyaguruge (SL)
Player of the match: AB de Villiers (SA)

- Bangladesh won the toss and elected to field.
- AB de Villiers (SA) scored his 25th century, made his highest score and hit his 200th six in ODIs.

=== 3rd ODI ===
22 October 2017
10:00
Scorecard

| South Africa; 369/6 (50 overs) | v | Bangladesh; 169 (40.4 overs) |
| Faf du Plessis 91* (67); Mehedi Hasan 2/59 (10 overs) | | Shakib Al Hasan 63 (82); Dane Paterson 3/44 (9 overs) |

South Africa won by 200 runs
Buffalo Park, East London
Umpires: Aleem Dar (Pak) and Shaun George (SA)
Player of the match: Faf du Plessis (SA)

- South Africa won the toss and elected to bat.
- Aiden Markram and Wiaan Mulder (SA) both made their ODI debuts.
- This was South Africa's highest total against Bangladesh in ODIs.

== T20I series ==
=== 1st T20I ===
26 October 2017
18:00 (N)
Scorecard

| South Africa; 195/4 (20 overs) | v | Bangladesh; 175/9 (20 overs) |
| Quinton de Kock 59 (44); Mehedi Hasan 2/31 (4 overs) | | Soumya Sarkar 47 (31); Andile Phehlukwayo 2/25 (4 overs) |

South Africa won by 20 runs
Mangaung Oval, Bloemfontein
Umpires: Shaun George (SA) and Adrian Holdstock (SA)
Player of the match: AB de Villiers (SA)

- South Africa won the toss and elected to bat.
- Robert Frylinck (SA) made his T20I debut.

=== 2nd T20I ===
29 October 2017
14:30
Scorecard

| South Africa; 224/4 (20 overs) | v | Bangladesh; 141 (18.3 overs) |
| David Miller 101* (36); Shakib Al Hasan 2/22 (4 overs) | | Soumya Sarkar 44 (27); JP Duminy 2/23 (4 overs) |

South Africa won by 83 runs
Senwes Park, Potchefstroom
Umpires: Shaun George (SA) and Bongani Jele (SA)
Player of the match: David Miller (SA)

- Bangladesh won the toss and elected to field.
- The venue hosted its first T20I match and it was the 100th T20I for South Africa.
- David Miller (SA) scored his first century in a T20I, which was the fastest century in a T20I (35 balls).
- David Miller also scored 31 runs in one over, the fifth highest from one over in T20Is.
