= 2027 Durban's Super Giants season =

Durban's Super Giants in 2027 SA20

Durban's Super Giants
2027 season
- Coach: Lance Klusener
- Captain(s): Aiden Markram
- Home ground: Kingsmead Cricket Ground
- League: SA20
- League Stage: –
- Playoffs: –

The 2027 Durban's Super Giants season is the fifth season of the franchise in the SA20. The team is captained by Aiden Markram and coached by Lance Klusener.

== Current squad ==
- Players with international caps are listed in **bold**.

Durban's Super Giants roster
Name	Nationality	Birth date	Batting Style	Bowling Style	Year signed	Notes
Batters

== League stage ==
The full fixture list was released on 23 July 2026.

**Match 3**
19 January 2027
17:30 (D/N)
Scorecard

**Pretoria Capitals (H)**	**v**	**Durban's Super Giants**

Centurion Park, Centurion

**Match 5**
21 January 2027
17:30 (D/N)
Scorecard

**Durban's Super Giants (H)**	**v**	**Sunrisers Eastern Cape**

Kingsmead Cricket Ground, Durban

**Match 7**
23 January 2027
13:00
Scorecard

**Durban's Super Giants (H)**	**v**	**Pretoria Capitals**

Kingsmead Cricket Ground, Durban

**Match 11**
27 January 2027
17:30 (D/N)
Scorecard

**Durban's Super Giants (H)**	**v**	**Paarl Royals**

Kingsmead Cricket Ground, Durban

**Match 15**
30 January 2027
17:30 (D/N)
Scorecard

**Joburg Super Kings (H)**	**v**	**Durban's Super Giants**

Wanderers Stadium, Johannesburg

**Match 17**
2 February 2027
17:30 (D/N)
Scorecard

**MI Cape Town (H)**	**v**	**Durban's Super Giants**

Newlands Cricket Ground, Cape Town

**Match 21**
6 February 2027
13:00
Scorecard

**Durban's Super Giants (H)**	**v**	**MI Cape Town**

Kingsmead Cricket Ground, Durban

**Match 24**
9 February 2027
17:30 (D/N)
Scorecard

**Sunrisers Eastern Cape (H)**	**v**	**Durban's Super Giants**

St George's Park Cricket Ground, Gqeberha

**Match 26**
11 February 2027
17:30 (D/N)
Scorecard

**Paarl Royals (H)**	**v**	**Durban's Super Giants**

Boland Park, Paarl

**Match 28**
13 February 2027
13:00
Scorecard

**Durban's Super Giants (H)**	**v**	**Joburg Super Kings**

Kingsmead Cricket Ground, Durban

== Standing ==
=== Points table ===
Pos	Team	Pld	W	L	NR	BP	Pts	NRR	Qualification
1	Durban's Super Giants	0	0	0	0	0	0	—	Advance to Qualifier 1
2	Joburg Super Kings	0	0	0	0	0	0	—	Advance to Qualifier 1
3	MI Cape Town	0	0	0	0	0	0	—	Advance to Eliminator
4	Pretoria Capitals	0	0	0	0	0	0	—	Advance to Eliminator
5	Paarl Royals	0	0	0	0	0	0	—	
6	Sunrisers Eastern Cape	0	0	0	0	0	0	—	

First match(es) will be played: 17 January 2027. Source: Cricinfo
- Points – Win 4, No Result 2. One additional point is awarded for a win when the run rate difference is 1.25 greater than the opposing side's.

=== Match summary ===
Team	League matches										Finals		
Team	1	2	3	4	5	6	7	8	9	10	QF/KO	Ch	F
Durban's Super Giants													

Win	Loss	Tie	No result

== Administration and support staff ==
Position	Name
Director Of Cricket	(Australia) Tom Moody
Head coach	(South Africa) Lance Klusener
Assistant coach	(South Africa) Rivash Gobind (South Africa) Ryan Cook
Fast Bowling Coach	(India) Bharat Arun
Spin Bowling Coach	(England) Carl Crowe
Source: DSG Staff
