= 2026 SA20 final =

Final match of SA20 2026

- Event: 2026 SA20
Pretoria Capitals	Sunrisers Eastern Cape
158/7	162/4
20 overs	19.4 overs
- Sunrisers Eastern Cape won by 6 wickets
- Date: 25 January 2026
- Venue: Newlands Cricket Ground, Cape Town
- Player of the match: Dewald Brevis (Pretoria Capitals)
- Umpires: Arno Jacobs (SA) and Allahuddien Paleker (SA)

The 2026 SA20 final was a Twenty20 (T20) cricket match played at the Newlands Cricket Ground, Cape Town, South Africa on 25 January 2026 to determine the winner of the 2026 SA20. It was played between the Pretoria Capitals and Sunrisers Eastern Cape.

In the final, Sunrisers Eastern Cape defeated Pretoria Capitals by 6 wickets to win their third title.

== Background ==
In January 2025, Cricket South Africa announced the windows of SA20 for the next three seasons. The league was sponsored by Betway. Star Sports Network retained the broadcasting rights for the 2026 SA20 season in Indian subcontinent.

The 2026 SA20 was the fourth season of the SA20, a franchise Twenty20 cricket league in South Africa. and organised by Cricket South Africa, featured six teams. The tournament took place from 26 December 2025 to 25 January 2026, with the final held in Cape Town.

Pretoria Capitals qualified for the final after winning the Qualifier 1 against Sunrisers Eastern Cape; who went on to defeat Paarl Royals in Qualifier 2 to secure their place in the Final.

=== Bracket ===
Qualifier 1
21 January 2026 — Durban
1	Sunrisers Eastern Cape	170/7 (20 overs)
2	Pretoria Capitals	172/3 (18.3 overs)
Eliminator
22 January 2026 — Centurion
3	Paarl Royals	210/5 (20 overs)
4	Joburg Super Kings	174/8 (20 overs)

Qualifier 2
23 January 2026 — Johannesburg
Q1L	Sunrisers Eastern Cape	117/3 (11.4 overs)
EW	Paarl Royals	114/7 (20 overs)

Final
25 January 2026 — Cape Town
Q1W	Pretoria Capitals	158/7 (20 overs)
Q2W	Sunrisers Eastern Cape	162/4 (19.2 overs)

== Match ==
=== Match officials ===
- On-field umpires: Arno Jacobs (SA) and Allahuddien Paleker (SA)
- Third umpire: Marais Erasmus (SA)
- Reserve umpire: Stephen Harris (SA)
- Match referee: Gerrie Pienaar (SA)
- Toss: Sunrisers Eastern Cape won the toss and elected to field.

=== Summary ===
Final
25 January 2026
17:30 (D/N)
Scorecard

Pretoria Capitals; 158/7 (20 overs)	v	Sunrisers Eastern Cape; 162/4 (19.2 overs)
Dewald Brevis 101 (56); Marco Jansen 3/10 (4 overs)		Matthew Breetzke 68* (49); Keshav Maharaj 1/23 (4 overs)

Sunrisers Eastern Cape won by 6 wickets
Newlands Cricket Ground, Cape Town
Umpires: Arno Jacobs (SA) and Allahuddien Paleker (SA)
Player of the match: Dewald Brevis (Pretoria Capitals)

- Sunrisers Eastern Cape won the toss and elected to field.
- Dewald Brevis (Pretoria Capitals) became the first player to score a century in the final of SA20.
