= Harry Birrell (cricketer) =

South African cricketer and schoolteacher

Personal information
- Full name: Henry Benson Birrell
- Born: 1 December 1927; Pietermaritzburg, Natal Province, South Africa
- Died: 18 September 2003 (aged 75); Boesmansriviermond, Eastern Cape, South Africa
- Batting: Right-handed
- Bowling: Right-arm medium
- Relatives: Adrian Birrell (son)

Domestic team information
- Years: Team
- 1947/48–1956/57: Eastern Province
- 1953–1954: Oxford University
- 1957/58–1959/60: Rhodesia

Career statistics
Competition	First-class
Matches	54
Runs scored	2,446
Batting average	26.58
100s/50s	3/13
Top score	134
Balls bowled	4,385
Wickets	55
Bowling average	35.25
5 wickets in innings	2
10 wickets in match	0
Best bowling	5/20
Catches/stumpings	18/–
- Source: Cricinfo, 3 August 2014

Henry Benson Birrell (1 December 1927 – 18 September 2003) was a South African cricketer and schoolmaster who played first-class cricket in South Africa, England, and Rhodesia from 1947 to 1960.

== Education ==
Harry Birrell was educated at St. Andrew's College, Grahamstown, and Rhodes University, where he received a BA degree and University Education Diploma, before going to Lincoln College, Oxford, to study for a BA (Hons) degree from 1952 to 1954.

== Cricket career ==
Birrell made his first-class debut for Eastern Province in 1947–48 and played 16 matches over the next four seasons as a middle-order batsman and medium-pace bowler. He reached 50 for the first time in his eighth match, playing for South African Universities against MCC in 1948–49, when he scored 56. He took 2 for 28 and 5 for 33 in Eastern Province's victory over Western Province in 1949–50. In the first match of the 1950–51 season he scored 83 and 22 and took 3 for 79 and 3 for 66 against Border.

At Oxford he played as an opening batsman and occasional bowler. He played in all 14 first-class matches in 1953, scoring 812 runs at an average of 32.48, coming second in both averages and aggregates to Colin Cowdrey. He was also one of the team's best fielders, with his "speed and fine throw". In his third match he scored 114 against Yorkshire, and in an effort to avoid defeat he batted five and a quarter hours to score 134 in the second innings against Worcestershire.

He missed the early matches in 1954 owing to examinations, but in five matches he scored 335 runs at 33.50 and took nine wickets. He excelled in the annual match against Cambridge University, scoring 27 and 64 and taking 2 for 89 and 5 for 20, "moving the ball a little either way at medium pace". Alongside his cricket Blue he also won a Rugby blue for Oxford.

He continued to open the batting when he resumed playing for Eastern Province in 1954–55, scoring 224 runs at 37.33 and taking seven wickets at 31.28 to help Eastern Province win Section B of the Currie Cup. He was less successful in 1955–56, with 243 runs at 24.30 and six wickets at 36.16.

He returned to the middle order when he moved to play for Rhodesia in 1957–58. Apart from scoring 116 to avert defeat against Natal in 1959–60 he was less successful, and he retired after the 1959–60 season.

He managed the tour of England by the Rhodesian Schools Fawns team in May and June 1962, in which the Rhodesian side played 25 matches for 20 wins and five draws.

== Teaching career ==
Birrell taught at Michaelhouse in Natal, then for six years at Milton in Bulawayo. When the former Test cricketer Anton Murray, who had played alongside Birrell for Eastern Province, was establishing St Alban's College in Pretoria in 1963 he recruited Birrell to serve as his second master. Murray later described his choice of Birrell as "one of the few strokes of genius I have ever had the good fortune to make". Later Birrell returned to his old school, St. Andrew's College, and taught there until his retirement.

== Personal life ==
Birrell wrote Evergreen: The History of the Diocesan School for Girls, Grahamstown 1874–1999 in 1999. He and his wife Sylvia had a son, Adrian, who is a cricket player and coach, and a daughter, Debbie.

The Harry Birrell Scholarship Trust, founded in 1996, helps African children from underprivileged backgrounds to receive a quality secondary education.
