= 2024 SA20 =

2nd season of the South African T20 League

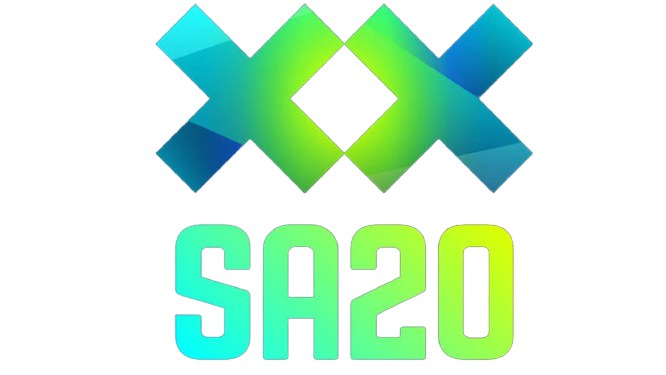
- Dates: 10 January – 10 February 2024
- Administrator: Cricket South Africa
- Cricket format: Twenty20
- Tournament format(s): Double round-robin and playoffs
- Champions: Sunrisers Eastern Cape (2nd title)
- Runners-up: Durban's Super Giants
- Participants: 6
- Matches: 34
- Player of the series: Heinrich Klaasen (Durban's Super Giants)
- Most runs: Ryan Rickelton (MI Cape Town) (530)
- Most wickets: Marco Jansen (Sunrisers Eastern Cape) (20)
- Official website: sa20.co.za

The 2024 SA20 or SA20 Season 2 (also known as Betway SA20 2024 for sponsorship reasons) was the second season of the SA20, a franchise Twenty20 cricket league in South Africa, organised by Cricket South Africa (CSA). The tournament started from 10 January and final was played on 10 February 2024. Sunrisers Eastern Cape were the defending champions.

The tournament was won by the Sunrisers Eastern Cape for the second successive season, with the team defeating Durban's Super Giants by 89 runs in the final.

== Squads ==
The player auction took place on 27 September 2023. A revised set of squads was released on 10 January, with replacements named for players that had withdrawn from the competition.

Durban's Super Giants	Joburg Super Kings	MI Cape Town	Paarl Royals	Pretoria Capitals	Sunrisers Eastern Cape
Quinton de Kock (c); Matthew Breetzke; Junior Dala; Keshav Maharaj; Heinrich Klaasen; Kyle Mayers (WI); Wiaan Mulder; Bryce Parsons; Keemo Paul (WI); Nicholas Pooran (WI); Dwaine Pretorius; Bhanuka Rajapaksa (SL); Jason Smith; JJ Smuts; Prenelan Subrayen; Reece Topley (ENG); Naveen ul Haq (AFG); ~~Kyle Abbott~~; ~~Dilshan Madushanka~~ (SL); Noor Ahmad (AFG); Tony de Zorzi; Richard Gleeson (ENG)	Faf du Plessis (c); Moeen Ali (ENG); Nandre Burger; Gerald Coetzee; Sam Cook (ENG); Donovan Ferreira; Dayyaan Galiem; Reeza Hendricks; Zahir Khan (AFG); Wayne Madsen (ENG); Sibonelo Makhanya; Aaron Phangiso; Leus Du Plooy (ENG); Romario Shepherd (WI); Kyle Simmonds (WI); Imran Tahir (PAK); David Wiese (NAM); Lizaad Williams; Ronan Hermann	Kieron Pollard (c) (WI); Tom Banton (ENG); Christopher Benjamin; Dewald Brevis; Sam Curran (ENG); Connor Esterhuizen; Beuran Hendricks; Duan Jansen; Thomas Kaber; George Linde; Liam Livingstone (ENG); Delano Potgieter; Kagiso Rabada; Ryan Rickelton; Grant Roelofsen; Olly Stone (ENG); Rassie van der Dussen; Nealan van Heerden; ~~Rashid Khan~~ (AFG); ~~Jofra Archer~~ (ENG); Nuwan Thushara (SL)	David Miller (c); Ferisco Adams; Fabian Allen (WI); Jos Buttler (ENG); Bjorn Fortuin; Evan Jones (ENG); Wihan Lubbe; Obed McCoy (WI); Lungi Ngidi; Andile Phehlukwayo; Jason Roy (ENG); Tabraiz Shamsi; Lorcan Tucker (IRE); John Turner (ENG); Mitchell van Buuren; Dane Vilas (ENG); Codi Yusuf; ~~Kwena Maphaka~~; ~~Lhuan-dre Pretorius~~; Keith Dudgeon; Ngaba Peter	Wayne Parnell (c); Matthew Boast (ENG); Eathan Bosch; Corbin Bosch; Shane Dadswell; Theunis de Bruyn; Daryn Dupavillon; Colin Ingram; Will Jacks (ENG); Senuran Muthusamy; James Neesham (NZ); Migael Pretorius; Adil Rashid (ENG); Rilee Rossouw; Phil Salt (ENG); Paul Stirling (IRE); Kyle Verreynne; ~~Anrich Nortje~~; ~~Steve Stolk~~; Tiaan van Vuuren; Hardus Viljoen	Aiden Markram (c); Tom Abell (ENG); Ottniel Baartman; Temba Bavuma; Liam Dawson (ENG); Sarel Erwee; Ayabulela Gqamane; Simon Harmer; Jordan Hermann; Marco Jansen; Dawid Malan (ENG); Adam Rossington (ENG); Caleb Seleka; Andile Simelane; Tristan Stubbs; Beyers Swanepoel; ~~Brydon Carse~~ (ENG); ~~Sisanda Magala~~; ~~Craig Overton~~ (ENG); Patrick Kruger; Daniel Worrall (AUS)

== Venues ==
Cape Town	Centurion	Durban
MI Cape Town	Pretoria Capitals	Durban's Super Giants
Newlands Cricket Ground	Centurion Park	Kingsmead Cricket Ground
Capacity: 25,000	Capacity: 22,000	Capacity: 25,000
2024 SA20 (South Africa)
Gqeberha	Johannesburg	Paarl
Sunrisers Eastern Cape	Joburg Super Kings	Paarl Royals
St George's Park Cricket Ground	Wanderers Stadium	Boland Park
Capacity: 19,000	Capacity: 34,000	Capacity: 10,000

== Teams and standings ==
=== Points table ===
Pos	Team	Pld	W	L	T	NR	BP	Pts	NRR	Qualification
1	Sunrisers Eastern Cape (C)	10	7	2	0	1	3	33	1.255	Advance to Qualifier 1
2	Durban's Super Giants (R)	10	7	3	0	0	4	32	1.402	Advance to Qualifier 1
3	Paarl Royals	10	5	5	0	0	2	22	−0.544	Advance to Eliminator
4	Joburg Super Kings	10	3	5	0	2	1	17	−1.640	Advance to Eliminator
5	Pretoria Capitals	10	3	6	0	1	0	14	−1.085	
6	MI Cape Town	10	3	7	0	0	1	13	0.114	

Source: ESPNcricinfo
(C) Champions; (R) Runners-up
- Points – Win 4, No Result 2. One additional point is awarded for a win when the run rate difference is 1.25 greater than the opposing side's.

=== Match summary ===
Visitor team →	DSG	JSK	MICT	PR	PC	SEC
Home team ↓	DSG	JSK	MICT	PR	PC	SEC
Durban's Super Giants		Durban; 37 runs	Durban; 11 runs	Durban; 125 runs	Durban; 8 runs	Eastern Cape; 5 wickets
Joburg Super Kings	Johannesburg; 7 wickets		Cape Town; 98 runs	Paarl; 5 wickets	Johannesburg; 6 wickets	Eastern Cape; 9 wickets
MI Cape Town	Durban; 36 runs	Johannesburg; 10 wickets		Cape Town; 8 wickets	Pretoria; 4 wickets	Eastern Cape; 4 runs
Paarl Royals	Durban; 57 runs	Paarl; 7 wickets	Paarl; 59 runs		Paarl; 27 runs	Eastern Cape; 44 runs
Pretoria Capitals	Pretoria; 17 runs	Match abandoned	Cape Town; 34 runs	Paarl; 10 runs		Pretoria; 3 runs
Sunrisers Eastern Cape	Durban; 35 runs	Match abandoned	Eastern Cape; 4 runs	Eastern Cape; 5 wickets	Eastern Cape; 9 wickets	

Home team won	Visitor team won

- Note: Results listed are according to the home (horizontal) and visitor (vertical) teams.
- Note: Click on a result to see a summary of the match.

== League stage ==
The full fixture list was released on 15 August 2023.

Match 1
10 January 2024
17:30 (D/N)
Scorecard

Sunrisers Eastern Cape	v	Joburg Super Kings

Match abandoned without a ball bowled
St George's Park Cricket Ground, Gqeberha
Umpires: Arno Jacobs and Lubabalo Gcuma

- No toss.
- No play was possible due to rain.

Match 2
11 January 2024
17:30 (D/N)
Scorecard

MI Cape Town; 207/5 (20 overs)	v	Durban's Super Giants; 177/6 (16.3 overs)
Ryan Rickelton 87 (51); Keemo Paul 2/31 (4 overs)		Heinrich Klaasen 85 (35); Kagiso Rabada 2/23 (3 overs)

Durban's Super Giants won by 11 runs (DLS method)
Kingsmead Cricket Ground, Durban
Umpires: Stephen Harris and Abdoellah Steenkamp
Player of the match: Heinrich Klaasen (Durban's Super Giants)

- Durban's Super Giants won the toss and elected to field.
- No further play was possible due to rain.

Match 3
12 January 2024
17:30 (D/N)
Scorecard

Paarl Royals; 160/7 (20 overs)	v	Pretoria Capitals; 133/7 (20 overs)
David Miller 41 (33); Daryn Dupavillon 2/29 (4 overs)		Phil Salt 39 (31); Andile Phehlukwayo 2/29 (4 overs)

Paarl Royals won by 27 runs
Boland Park, Paarl
Umpires: Arno Jacobs and Brad White
Player of the match: Andile Phehlukwayo (Paarl Royals)

- Pretoria Capitals won the toss and elected to field.

Match 4
13 January 2024
13:30
Scorecard

MI Cape Town; 243/5 (20 overs)	v	Joburg Super Kings; 145 (17.5 overs)
Rassie van der Dussen 104 (50); Nandre Burger 2/53 (4 overs)		Leus du Plooy 48 (24); Olly Stone 2/18 (2.5 overs)

MI Cape Town won by 98 runs
Wanderers Stadium, Johannesburg
Umpires: Lubabalo Gcuma and Dennis Smith
Player of the match: Rassie van der Dussen (MI Cape Town)

- Joburg Super Kings won the toss and elected to field.
- MI Cape Town were awarded a bonus point for a win with a run rate difference greater than 1.25.

Match 5
13 January 2024
17:30 (D/N)
Scorecard

Durban's Super Giants; 225/3 (20 overs)	v	Sunrisers Eastern Cape; 190/9 (20 overs)
JJ Smuts 75 (38); Daniel Worrall 2/35 (4 overs)		Tom Abell 65 (36); Dwaine Pretorius 2/19 (2 overs)

Durban's Super Giants won by 35 runs
St George's Park Cricket Ground, Gqeberha
Umpires: Siphelele Gasa and Stephen Harris
Player of the match: JJ Smuts (Durban's Super Giants)

- Durban's Super Giants won the toss and elected to bat.

Match 6
14 January 2024
15:30 (D/N)
Scorecard

Paarl Royals; 210/3 (20 overs)	v	Pretoria Capitals; 200/7 (20 overs)
David Miller 75* (42); James Neesham 1/18 (2 overs)		Rilee Rossouw 82 (45); Lungi Ngidi 4/39 (4 overs)

Paarl Royals won by 10 runs
Centurion Park, Centurion
Umpires: Marais Erasmus and Arno Jacobs
Player of the match: Lungi Ngidi (Paarl Royals)

- Pretoria Capitals won the toss and elected to field.

Match 7
15 January 2024
17:30 (D/N)
Scorecard

Durban's Super Giants; 145/8 (20 overs)	v	Joburg Super Kings; 108/9 (20 overs)
Heinrich Klaasen 64 (41); Lizaad Williams 4/26 (4 overs)		Reeza Hendricks 38 (32); Reece Topley 3/19 (4 overs)

Durban's Super Giants won by 37 runs
Kingsmead Cricket Ground, Durban
Umpires: Marais Erasmus and Mazizi Gampu
Player of the match: Heinrich Klaasen (Durban's Super Giants)

- Durban's Super Giants won the toss and elected to bat.
- Durban's Super Giants were awarded a bonus point for a win with a run rate difference greater than 1.25.

Match 8
16 January 2024
17:30 (D/N)
Scorecard

Sunrisers Eastern Cape; 202/2 (20 overs)	v	MI Cape Town; 198/5 (20 overs)
Jordan Hermann 106* (62); Kieron Pollard 2/22 (3 overs)		Ryan Rickelton 58 (33); Ottniel Baartman 3/35 (4 overs)

Sunrisers Eastern Cape won by 4 runs
Newlands Cricket Ground, Cape Town
Umpires: Marais Erasmus and Thomas Mokorosi
Player of the match: Jordan Hermann (Sunrisers Eastern Cape)

- Sunrisers Eastern Cape won the toss and elected to bat.

Match 9
17 January 2024
17:30 (D/N)
Scorecard

Joburg Super Kings; 134 (19.5 overs)	v	Paarl Royals; 135/3 (14.1 overs)
Leus du Plooy 71 (43); Lungi Ngidi 3/17 (3.5 overs)		Jos Buttler 70* (37); Imran Tahir 1/12 (4 overs)

Paarl Royals won by 7 wickets
Boland Park, Paarl
Umpires: Marais Erasmus and Lauren Agenbag
Player of the match: Jos Buttler (Paarl Royals)

- Joburg Super Kings won the toss and elected to bat.
- Paarl Royals were awarded a bonus point for a win with a run rate difference greater than 1.25.

Match 10
18 January 2024
17:30 (D/N)
Scorecard

Pretoria Capitals; 204/9 (20 overs)	v	Durban's Super Giants; 187/7 (20 overs)
Will Jacks 101 (42); Reece Topley 3/34 (4 overs)		Matthew Breetzke 33 (24); Will Jacks 2/18 (3 overs)

Pretoria Capitals won by 17 runs
Centurion Park, Centurion
Umpires: Lubabalo Gcuma and Abongile Sodumo
Player of the match: Will Jacks (Pretoria Capitals)

- Pretoria Capitals won the toss and elected to bat.

Match 11
19 January 2024
17:30 (D/N)
Scorecard

Paarl Royals; 172/8 (20 overs)	v	MI Cape Town; 175/2 (16.5 overs)
Jos Buttler 46 (31); Thomas Kaber 3/20 (4 overs)		Ryan Rickelton 94* (52); Tabraiz Shamsi 2/35 (4 overs)

MI Cape Town won by 8 wickets
Newlands Cricket Ground, Cape Town
Umpires: Marais Erasmus and Russell Warren
Player of the match: Ryan Rickelton (MI Cape Town)

- MI Cape Town won the toss and elected to field.

Match 12
20 January 2024
13:30
Scorecard

Durban's Super Giants; 159/7 (20 overs)	v	Sunrisers Eastern Cape; 163/5 (19.2 overs)
Wiaan Mulder 52 (29); Simon Harmer 4/18 (4 overs)		Tristan Stubbs 66* (37); Marcus Stoinis 2/27 (4 overs)

Sunrisers Eastern Cape won by 5 wickets
Kingsmead Cricket Ground, Durban
Umpires: Ryan Hendricks and Dennis Smith
Player of the match: Simon Harmer (Sunrisers Eastern Cape)

- Durban's Super Giants won the toss and elected to bat.

Match 13
20 January 2024
17:30 (D/N)
Scorecard

Pretoria Capitals; 167/9 (20 overs)	v	Joburg Super Kings; 171/4 (18 overs)
Kyle Verreynne 72* (52); Lizaad Williams 3/26 (4 overs)		Donovan Ferreira 56* (20); Will Jacks 2/26 (4 overs)

Joburg Super Kings won by 6 wickets
Wanderers Stadium, Johannesburg
Umpires: Stephen Harris and Brad White
Player of the match: Donovan Ferreira (Joburg Super Kings)

- Pretoria Capitals won the toss and elected to bat.

Match 14
21 January 2024
15:30 (D/N)
Scorecard

Paarl Royals; 162/3 (20 overs)	v	MI Cape Town; 103 (18.2 overs)
Jason Roy 68 (46); Nuwan Thushara 2/27 (4 overs)		Connor Esterhuizen 32 (36); Bjorn Fortuin 3/15 (4 overs)

Paarl Royals won by 59 runs
Boland Park, Paarl
Umpires: Lubabalo Gcuma and Russell Warren
Player of the match: Bjorn Fortuin (Paarl Royals)

- MI Cape Town won the toss and elected to field.
- Paarl Royals were awarded a bonus point for a win with a run rate difference greater than 1.25.

Match 15
22 January 2024
17:30 (D/N)
Scorecard

Pretoria Capitals; 52 (13.3 overs)	v	Sunrisers Eastern Cape; 54/1 (6.5 overs)
Will Jacks 12 (12); Ottneil Baartman 4/12 (3.3 overs)		Tom Abell 31* (22); Wayne Parnell 1/19 (2 overs)

Sunrisers Eastern Cape won by 9 wickets
St George's Park Cricket Ground, Gqeberha
Umpires: Stephen Harris and Phillip Vosloo
Player of the match: Ottneil Baartman (Sunrisers Eastern Cape)

- Sunrisers Eastern Cape won the toss and elected to field.
- Sunrisers Eastern Cape were awarded a bonus point for a win with a run rate difference greater than 1.25.

Match 16
23 January 2024
17:30 (D/N)
Scorecard

Durban's Super Giants; 157/6 (20 overs)	v	MI Cape Town; 121/9 (20 overs)
Matthew Breetzke 48 (46); George Linde 2/15 (4 overs)		Sam Curran 38 (27); Marcus Stoinis 3/18 (4 overs)

Durban's Super Giants won by 36 runs
Newlands Cricket Ground, Cape Town
Umpires: Lauren Agenbag and Brad White
Player of the match: George Linde (MI Cape Town)

- MI Cape Town won the toss and elected to field.
- Durban's Super Giants were awarded a bonus point for a win with a run rate difference greater than 1.25.

Match 17
24 January 2024
17:30 (D/N)
Scorecard

Joburg Super Kings; 168/3 (20 overs)	v	Paarl Royals; 171/5 (19 overs)
Reeza Hendricks 79* (56); Andile Phehlukwayo 1/18 (3 overs)		Wiaan Lubbe 57 (48); Moeen Ali 2/31 (4 overs)

Paarl Royals won by 5 wickets
Wanderers Stadium, Johannesburg
Umpires: Dennis Smith and Russell Warren
Player of the match: Reeza Hendricks (Joburg Super Kings)

- Paarl Royals won the toss and elected to field.

Match 18
25 January 2024
17:30 (D/N)
Scorecard

Pretoria Capitals; 125 (18.3 overs)	v	Sunrisers Eastern Cape; 122/9 (20 overs)
James Neesham 27 (26); Marco Jansen 3/27 (3.3 overs)		Tristan Stubbs 35 (30); Adil Rashid 3/30 (4 overs)

Pretoria Capitals won by 3 runs
Centurion Park, Centurion
Umpires: Mazizi Gampu and Arno Jacobs
Player of the match: Eathan Bosch (Pretoria Capitals)

- Sunrisers Eastern Cape won the toss and elected to field.

Match 19
26 January 2024
17:30 (D/N)
Scorecard

Durban's Super Giants; 190/3 (20 overs)	v	Paarl Royals; 133 (19.3 overs)
Quinton de Kock 83* (51); Bjorn Fortuin 1/32 (4 overs)		Jos Buttler 45 (36); Marcus Stoinis 3/24 (4 overs)

Durban's Super Giants won by 57 runs
Boland Park, Paarl
Umpires: Stephen Harris and Ryan Hendricks
Player of the match: Quinton de Kock (Durban's Super Giants)

- Durban's Super Giants won the toss and elected to bat.
- Durban's Super Giants were awarded a bonus point for a win with a run rate difference greater than 1.25.

Match 20
27 January 2024
13:30
Scorecard

Sunrisers Eastern Cape; 175/6 (20 overs)	v	MI Cape Town; 171/7 (20 overs)
Tom Abell 60 (44); Kagiso Rabada 2/26 (3 overs)		Sam Curran 30 (21); Ottniel Baartman 2/24 (4 overs)

Sunrisers Eastern Cape won by 4 runs
St George's Park Cricket Ground, Gqeberha
Umpires: Thomas Mokorosi and Dennis Smith
Player of the match: Tom Abell (Sunrisers Eastern Cape)

- Sunrisers Eastern Cape won the toss and elected to bat.

Match 21
27 January 2024
17:30 (D/N)
Scorecard

Joburg Super Kings; 44/2 (4.4 overs)	v	Pretoria Capitals
Faf du Plessis 25* (12); Eathan Bosch 2/15 (2.4 overs)

No result
Centurion Park, Centurion
Umpires: Lubabalo Gcuma and Arno Jacobs

- Pretoria Capitals won the toss and elected to field.
- Rain prevented any further play.

Match 22
28 January 2024
15:30 (D/N)
Scorecard

Durban's Super Giants; 208/7 (20 overs)	v	Paarl Royals; 83 (13.2 overs)
Matthew Breetzke 78 (43); Tabraiz Shamsi 2/20 (4 overs)		Mitchell Van Buuren 36* (27); Noor Ahmad 5/11 (3.2 overs)

Durban's Super Giants won by 125 runs
Kingsmead Cricket Ground, Durban
Umpires: Abongile Sodumo and Abdoellah Steenkamp
Player of the match: Matthew Breetzke (Durban's Super Giants)

- Durban's Super Giants won the toss and elected to bat.
- Durban's Super Giants were awarded a bonus point for a win with a run rate difference greater than 1.25.

Match 23
29 January 2024
17:30 (D/N)
Scorecard

MI Cape Town; 80/3 (8 overs)	v	Joburg Super Kings; 98/0 (5.4 overs)
Kieron Pollard 33* (10); Imran Tahir 2/13 (1 over)		Faf du Plessis 50* (20)

Joburg Super Kings won by 10 wickets (DLS method)
Newlands Cricket Ground, Cape Town
Umpires: Lubabalo Gcuma and Brad White
Player of the match: Faf du Plessis (Joburg Super Kings)

- Joburg Super Kings won the toss and elected to field.
- The match was reduced to 8 overs per side due to rain.
- Joburg Super Kings were set a revised target of 98 runs from 8 overs due to rain.
- Joburg Super Kings were awarded a bonus point for a win with a run rate difference greater than 1.25.

Match 24
30 January 2024
17:30 (D/N)
Scorecard

Durban's Super Giants; 174/9 (20 overs)	v	Pretoria Capitals; 166/9 (20 overs)
Matthew Breetzke 73 (46); Daryn Dupavillon 3/25 (4 overs)		Will Jacks 41 (26); Junior Dala 5/26 (4 overs)

Durban's Super Giants won by 8 runs
Kingsmead Cricket Ground, Durban
Umpires: Stephen Harris and Abdoellah Steenkamp
Player of the match: Matthew Breetzke (Durban's Super Giants)

- Durban's Super Giants won the toss and elected to bat.

Match 25
31 January 2024
17:30 (D/N)
Scorecard

Joburg Super Kings; 78 (15.2 overs)	v	Sunrisers Eastern Cape; 79/1 (11 overs)
Wayne Madsen 32 (23); Patrick Kruger 3/8 (2 overs)		Dawid Malan 40* (32); Lizaad Williams 1/7 (2 overs)

Sunrisers Eastern Cape won by 9 wickets
Wanderers Stadium, Johannesburg
Umpires: Arno Jacobs and Phillip Vosloo
Player of the match: Daniel Worrall (Sunrisers Eastern Cape)

- Sunrisers Eastern Cape won the toss and elected to field.
- Sunrisers Eastern Cape were awarded a bonus point for a win with a run rate difference greater than 1.25.

Match 26
1 February 2024
17:30 (D/N)
Scorecard

MI Cape Town; 248/4 (20 overs)	v	Pretoria Capitals; 214/8 (20 overs)
Ryan Rickelton 90 (45); Wayne Parnell 3/57 (4 overs)		Kyle Verreynne 116* (52); Nuwan Thushara 3/37 (4 overs)

MI Cape Town won by 34 runs
Centurion Park, Centurion
Umpires: Siphelele Gasa and Dennis Smith
Player of the match: Kyle Verreynne (Pretoria Capitals)

- MI Cape Town won the toss and elected to bat.

Match 27
2 February 2024
17:30 (D/N)
Scorecard

Sunrisers Eastern Cape; 208/4 (20 overs)	v	Paarl Royals; 164/7 (20 overs)
Marco Jansen 71* (31); Evan Jones 2/51 (4 overs)		Jos Buttler 64 (45); Liam Dawson 2/27 (4 overs)

Sunrisers Eastern Cape won by 44 runs
Boland Park, Paarl
Umpires: Thomas Mokorosi and Brad White
Player of the match: Marco Jansen (Sunrisers Eastern Cape)

- Sunrisers Eastern Cape won the toss and elected to bat.
- Sunrisers Eastern Cape were awarded a bonus point for a win with a run rate difference greater than 1.25.

Match 28
3 February 2024
13:30 (D/N)
Scorecard

MI Cape Town; 163/9 (20 overs)	v	Pretoria Capitals; 167/6 (19.4 overs)
Rassie van der Dussen 60 (46); Wayne Parnell 4/33 (4 overs)		Theunis de Bruyn 42 (33); George Linde 2/36 (4 overs)

Pretoria Capitals won by 4 wickets
Newlands Cricket Ground, Cape Town
Umpires: Lubabalo Gcuma and Brad White
Player of the match: Kagiso Rabada (MI Cape Town)

- MI Cape Town won the toss and elected to bat.

Match 29
3 February 2024
17:30 (D/N)
Scorecard

Durban's Super Giants; 203/6 (20 overs)	v	Joburg Super Kings; 209/3 (19.5 overs)
Wiaan Mulder 59 (40); Lizaad Williams 3/47 (4 overs)		Faf du Plessis 57 (29); Noor Ahmad 2/16 (4 overs)

Joburg Super Kings won by 7 wickets
Wanderers Stadium, Johannesburg
Umpires: Siphelele Gasa and Arno Jacobs
Player of the match: Faf du Plessis (Joburg Super Kings)

- Joburg Super Kings won the toss and elected to field.

Match 30
4 February 2024
15:30 (D/N)
Scorecard

Paarl Royals; 159/7 (20 overs)	v	Sunrisers Eastern Cape; 165/5 (19.5 overs)
Jos Buttler 38 (22); Ottniel Baartman 2/33 (4 overs)		Aiden Markram 37 (27); Andile Phehlukwayo 3/33 (4 overs)

Sunrisers Eastern Cape won by 5 wickets
St George's Park Cricket Ground, Gqeberha
Umpires: Stephen Harris and Abdoellah Steenkamp
Player of the match: Patrick Kruger (Sunrisers Eastern Cape)

- Paarl Royals won the toss and elected to bat.

== Playoffs ==
=== Bracket ===
Qualifier 1
6 February 2024 — Cape Town
1	Sunrisers Eastern Cape	157/8 (20 overs)
2	Durban's Super Giants	106 (19.3 overs)
Eliminator
7 February 2024 — Johannesburg
3	Paarl Royals	138 (18.5 overs)
4	Joburg Super Kings	139/1 (13.2 overs)

Qualifier 2
8 February 2024 — Johannesburg
Q1L	Durban's Super Giants	211/6 (20 overs)
EW	Joburg Super Kings	142 (17.4 overs)

Final
10 February 2024 — Cape Town
Q1W	Sunrisers Eastern Cape	204/3 (20 overs)
Q2W	Durban's Super Giants	115 (17 overs)

=== Qualifier 1 ===
Qualifier 1
6 February 2024
17:30 (D/N)
Scorecard

Sunrisers Eastern Cape; 157/8 (20 overs)	v	Durban's Super Giants; 106 (19.3 overs)
Dawid Malan 63 (45); Keshav Maharaj 2/30 (4 overs)		Wiaan Mulder 38 (34); Ottniel Baartman 4/10 (4 overs)

Sunrisers Eastern Cape won by 51 runs
Newlands Cricket Ground, Cape Town
Umpires: Lubabalo Gcuma and Stephen Harris
Player of the match: Ottniel Baartman (Sunrisers Eastern Cape)

- Sunrisers Eastern Cape won the toss and elected to bat.

=== Eliminator ===
Eliminator
7 February 2024
17:30 (D/N)
Scorecard

Paarl Royals; 138 (18.5 overs)	v	Joburg Super Kings; 139/1 (13.2 overs)
David Miller 47 (40); Sam Cook 4/24 (3.5 overs)		Leus du Plooy 68 (43); Tabraiz Shamsi 1/43 (4 overs)

Joburg Super Kings won by 9 wickets
Wanderers Stadium, Johannesburg
Umpires: Lubabalo Gcuma and Arno Jacobs
Player of the match: Sam Cook (Joburg Super Kings)

- Joburg Super Kings won the toss and elected to field.

=== Qualifier 2 ===
Qualifier 2
8 February 2024
17:30 (D/N)
Scorecard

Durban's Super Giants; 211/6 (20 overs)	v	Joburg Super Kings; 142 (17.4 overs)
Heinrich Klaasen 74 (30); Nandre Burger 2/27 (4 overs)		Moeen Ali 30 (26); Junior Dala 4/38 (3.4 overs)

Durban's Super Giants won by 69 runs
Wanderers Stadium, Johannesburg
Umpires: Stephen Harris and Arno Jacobs
Player of the match: Heinrich Klaasen (Durban's Super Giants)

- Joburg Super Kings won the toss and elected to field.

=== Final ===
Final
10 February 2024
17:30 (D/N)
Scorecard

Sunrisers Eastern Cape; 204/3 (20 overs)	v	Durban's Super Giants; 115 (17 overs)
Tristan Stubbs 56* (30); Keshav Maharaj 2/33 (4 overs)		Wiaan Mulder 38 (22); Marco Jansen 5/30 (4 overs)

Sunrisers Eastern Cape won by 89 runs
Newlands Cricket Ground, Cape Town
Umpires: Lubabalo Gcuma and Stephen Harris
Player of the match: Tom Abell (Sunrisers Eastern Cape)

- Sunrisers Eastern Cape won the toss and elected to bat.

== Statistics ==
=== Highest team totals ===
Team	Scores	Opponent	Result	Venue
MI Cape Town	248/4	Pretoria Capitals	Won	Centurion
MI Cape Town	243/5	Joburg Super Kings	Won	Johannesburg
Durban's Super Giants	225/3	Sunrisers Eastern Cape	Won	Gqeberha
Pretoria Capitals	214/8	MI Cape Town	Lost	Centurion
Durban's Super Giants	211/6	Joburg Super Kings	Won	Johannesburg

- Source: ESPN Cricinfo

=== Most individual runs ===
Player	Team	Innings	Runs	Highest score
Ryan Rickelton	MI Cape Town	10	530	98
Heinrich Klassen	Durban's Super Giants	13	447	85
Matthew Breetzke	Durban's Super Giants	13	416	78
Jos Buttler	Paarl Royals	11	408	70
Leus du Plooy	Joburg Super Kings	11	377	71

- Source: ESPN Cricinfo

=== Most individual wickets ===
Player	Team	Matches	Wickets	Best bowling
Marco Jansen	Sunrisers Eastern Cape	10	20	5/30
Ottniel Baartman	Sunrisers Eastern Cape	8	18	4/10
Daniel Worrall	Sunrisers Eastern Cape	11	17	3/20
Lizaad Williams	Joburg Super Kings	9	15	4/26
Keshav Maharaj	Durban's Super Giants	13	15	2/17

- Source: ESPN Cricinfo

== Awards ==
On 10 February 2024, the list of end of season awards was announced, to be handed out after the final match.

Team	Award	Prize money
Sunrisers Eastern Cape	Champions	R32.5 million (US$2.2 million)
Durban's Super Giants	Runners-up	R16.25 million (US$1.1 million)
Sunrisers Eastern Cape	Spirit of the season	R100,000 (US$6,765.9)

Name	Team	Award	Prize money
Heinrich Klaasen	Durban's Super Giants	Player of the season	R350,000 (US$23,680.65)
Heinrich Klaasen	Durban's Super Giants	Batter of the season	R200,000 (US$13,531.8)
Ottniel Baartman	Sunrisers Eastern Cape	Bowler of the season	R200,000 (US$13,531.8)
Marco Jansen	Sunrisers Eastern Cape	Rising star	R100,000 (US$6,765.9)

== Attendance ==
10 league games took place in front of capacity crowds, around 70% of all tickets were sold.

Team	Average attendance
Joburg Super Kings	24,852
Durban's Super Giants	18,340
MI Cape Town	18,289
Pretoria Capitals	16,089
Sunrisers Eastern Cape	13,892
Paarl Royals	7,339
