= List of international cricket centuries by AB de Villiers =

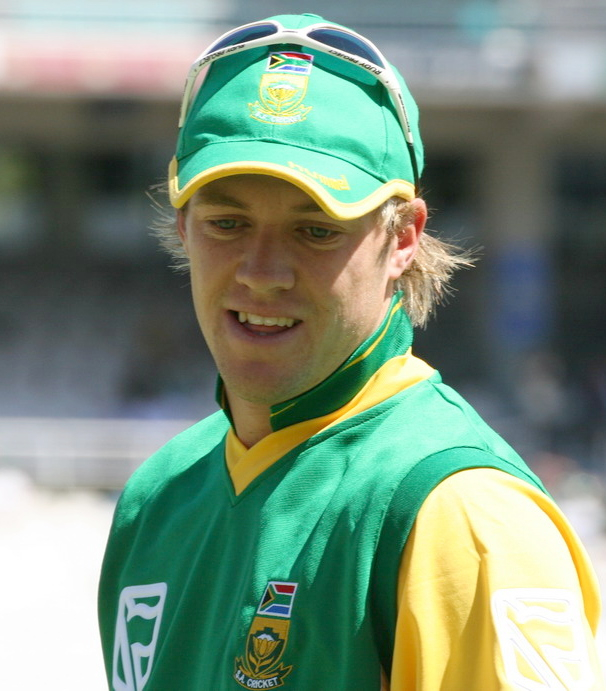
AB de Villiers has scored 47 centuries in international cricket

AB de Villiers is a former South African cricketer who captained the national team between 2012 and 2017. A right-handed batsman, he scored 51 centuries (100 or more runs in a single innings)—22 in Tests, 4 in T20 and 25 in ODIs—over his playing career. He reached the top of the ICC Test batting rankings in March 2012.

De Villiers made his Test debut in December 2004 against England, scoring 28 and 15. He made his first Test century the following month, scoring 109 in the drawn fifth Test at Centurion. His first double-century came in April 2008 against India when he scored 217 not out in a man-of-the-match performance in Ahmedabad. He has scored 22 Test centuries and holds the record for the second-highest individual score by a South African batsman, with 278 not out against Pakistan. (Note: The record is held by Hashim Amla (311 not out against England in 2012).) De Villiers has the fourth-highest number of centuries in Tests for South Africa.

De Villiers' made his ODI debut in February 2005 against England; he scored 20 in the tied match. His first century in the format came two years later in a man-of-the-match performance when he scored 146 against the West Indies at Grenada during the 2007 Cricket World Cup. He holds the record for the fastest half-century (off 16 balls) and century (off 31 balls) in ODIs. Both were achieved during the course of his 149 (off 44 balls) against West Indies in January 2015. He hit 16 sixes in the match and leveled the then record of most sixes by a batsman (held by India's Rohit Sharma) in an innings. As of May 2024, he has the joint seventh-highest number (25) of centuries in ODIs. (Note: He shares the position with Sri Lanka's Kumar Sangakkara and West Indies' Chris Gayle.)

Between 2006 and 2017, de Villiers played 78 Twenty20 International matches. His highest score of 79 not out was made in the 2009 ICC World Twenty20 match against Scotland which South Africa won by 130-runs. As of May 2024, de Villiers ranks joint-twelfth (with 47 centuries) in the all-time list for most centuries in international cricket.

== Key ==
Symbol	Meaning
*	Remained not out
†	Man of the match
‡	Captained the South Africa cricket team
Balls	Balls faced
Pos.	Position in the batting order
Inn.	The innings of the match
Test	The number of the Test match played in that series
S/R	Strike rate during the innings
H/A/N	Venue was at home (South Africa), away or neutral
Date	Date the match was held, or the starting date of match for Test matches
Lost	The match was lost by South Africa.
Won	The match was won by South Africa.
Drawn	The match was drawn.
(D/L)	The result was determined by the Duckworth–Lewis method.

== Test centuries ==
List of Test centuries scored by AB de Villiers
No.	Score	Against	Pos.	Inn.	Test	Venue	H/A/N	Date	Result	Ref
1	109 †	England	1	3	5/5	SuperSport Park, Centurion	Home	21 January 2005	Drawn	
2	178	West Indies	2	2	3/4	Kensington Oval, Bridgetown	Away	21 April 2005	Won	
3	114	West Indies	1	1	4/4	Antigua Recreation Ground, St John's	Away	29 April 2005	Drawn	
4	103*	West Indies	6	2	3/3	Kingsmead Cricket Ground, Durban	Home	10 January 2008	Won	
5	217* †	India	6	2	2/3	Sardar Patel Stadium, Ahmedabad	Away	3 April 2008	Won	
6	174	England	6	2	2/4	Headingley, Leeds	Away	18 July 2008	Won	
7	106* †	Australia	5	4	1/3	WACA Ground, Perth	Away	17 December 2008	Won	
8	104*	Australia	5	2	1/3	New Wanderers Stadium, Johannesburg	Home	26 February 2009	Lost	
9	163	Australia	5	2	3/3	Newlands Cricket Ground, Cape Town	Home	19 March 2009	Won	
10	135*	West Indies	5	1	2/3	Warner Park, Basseterre	Away	18 June 2010	Drawn	
11	278* †	Pakistan	5	1	2/2	Sheikh Zayed Cricket Stadium, Abu Dhabi	Neutral	20 November 2010	Drawn	
12	129	India	5	2	1/3	SuperSport Park, Centurion	Home	16 December 2010	Won	
13	160*	Sri Lanka	5	1	3/3	Newlands Cricket Ground, Cape Town	Home	3 January 2012	Won	
14	169	Australia	5	3	3/3	WACA Ground, Perth	Away	30 November 2012	Won	
15	103*	Pakistan	5	3	1/3	New Wanderers Stadium, Johannesburg	Home	3 February 2013	Won	
16	121	Pakistan	5	1	3/3	SuperSport Park, Centurion	Home	22 February 2013	Won	
17	164	Pakistan	6	2	2/2	Dubai International Cricket Stadium, Dubai	Neutral	23 October 2013	Won	
18	103	India	6	4	1/2	New Wanderers Stadium, Johannesburg	Home	22 December 2013	Drawn	
19	116	Australia	5	1	2/3	St George's Park, Port Elizabeth	Home	20 February 2014	Won	
20	152	West Indies	5	1	1/3	SuperSport Park, Centurion	Home	17 December 2014	Won	
21	148 †	West Indies	5	2	3/3	Newlands Cricket Ground, Cape Town	Home	4 January 2015	Won	
22	126*	Australia	5	2	2/4	St George's Park, Port Elizabeth	Home	9 March 2018	Won	

== One Day International centuries ==
List of ODI centuries scored by AB de Villiers
No.	Score	Against	Pos.	Inn.	S/R	Venue	H/A/N	Date	Result	Ref
1	146 †	West Indies	1	1	112.30	National Cricket Stadium, St George's	Away	10 April 2007	Won	
2	107 †	Zimbabwe	4	1	120.22	Harare Sports Club, Harare	Away	26 August 2007	Won	
3	103* †	Pakistan	4	1	108.42	Gaddafi Stadium, Lahore	Away	18 October 2007	Won	
4	121 †	England	3	1	142.35	Newlands Cricket Ground, Cape Town	Home	27 November 2009	Won	
5	114*	India	5	2	112.87	Roop Singh Stadium, Gwalior	Away	24 February 2010	Lost	
6	102* †	India	4	1	172.88	Sardar Patel Stadium, Ahmedabad	Away	27 February 2010	Won	
7	102	West Indies	4	1	100.99	Sir Vivian Richards Stadium, Antigua	Away	22 May 2010	Won (D/L)	
8	101*	Zimbabwe	3	2	140.27	Senwes Park, Potchefstroom	Home	17 October 2010	Won	
9	109	Zimbabwe	4	1	110.10	Willowmoore Park, Benoni	Home	22 October 2010	Won	
10	107* †	West Indies	4	2	101.90	Feroz Shah Kotla Ground, Delhi	Neutral	24 February 2011	Won	
11	134 †	Netherlands	4	1	136.73	PCA Stadium, Mohali	Neutral	3 March 2011	Won	
12	125* ‡	Sri Lanka	4	1	127.55	New Wanderers Stadium, Johannesburg	Home	22 January 2012	Lost	
13	106* †‡	New Zealand	5	2	100.00	Westpac Stadium, Wellington	Away	25 February 2012	Won	
14	128 †‡ (Note: De Villiers shared the man of the match award with Hashim Amla.)	Pakistan	2	1	118.51	New Wanderers Stadium, Johannesburg	Home	17 March 2013	Won	
15	115* †‡	Pakistan	5	1	112.74	Sharjah Cricket Stadium, Sharjah	Neutral	11 November 2013	Won	
16	109 ‡	India	5	1	107.92	SuperSport Park, Centurion,	Home	11 December 2013	No result	
17	108 †‡	Sri Lanka	4	1	152.11	MRIC Stadium, Hambantota, Sri Lanka	Away	12 July 2014	Won	
18	136* †‡	Australia	4	2	128.30	Harare Sports Club, Harare	Neutral	27 August 2014	Won	
19	149 †‡	West Indies	3	1	338.63	New Wanderers Stadium, Johannesburg	Home	18 January 2015	Won	
20	162* †‡	West Indies	5	1	245.45	Sydney Cricket Ground, Sydney	Neutral	27 February 2015	Won	
21	104* †‡	India	4	1	142.47	Green Park Stadium, Kanpur	Away	11 October 2015	Won	
22	112 ‡	India	4	2	104.67	M. A. Chidambaram Stadium, Chennai	Away	22 October 2015	Lost	
23	119 ‡	India	4	1	195.08	Wankhede Stadium, Mumbai	Away	25 October 2015	Won	
24	101* †‡	England	5	2	104.12	Newlands Cricket Ground, Cape Town	Home	14 February 2016	Won	
25	176 †	Bangladesh	4	1	169.23	Boland Park, Paarl	Home	18 October 2017	Won	
