= Sunrisers Eastern Cape =

South African franchise cricket team

- League: SA20

Personnel
- Captain: Tristan Stubbs
- Coach: Adrian Birrell
- Bowling coach: Dale Steyn
- Owner: Sun Group
- Chief executive: Kavya Maran

Team information
- City: Gqeberha, South Africa
- Colors: Orange
- Founded: 2023; 3 years ago
- Home ground: St George's Park Cricket Ground, Gqeberha
- Capacity: 19,000

History
- Twenty20 debut: v. Pretoria Capitals at St George's Park Cricket Ground, Gqeberha; 10 January 2023
- SA20 wins: 3 (2023, 2024, 2026)
- Official website: https://sunriserseasterncape.co/
T20I kit

Season
- • 2023 • 2024 • 2025 • 2026 • 2027

Sunrisers Eastern Cape is a South African professional Twenty20 franchise cricket team that competes in the SA20 tournament. The team is based in Gqeberha, and was formed in 2022. The team's home-ground is St George's Park Cricket Ground. The team is coached by Adrian Birrell. The franchise is owned by the Indian SUN Group.

== History ==
In August 2022, Cricket South Africa announced the establishment of the SA20, a Twenty20 Cricket competition to be started in 2023. The teams for the competition, representing six cities, including the Eastern Cape, were put up on auction in September 2022. The franchise is owned by Kalanithi Maran of the Sun Group.

=== 2023 season ===
They were the champions of the first season of the tournament after they beat Pretoria Capitals by four wickets in the final at the Wanderers Stadium, Johannesburg. Having successfully lead the team to their inaugural SA20 title, Markram was later appointed as the captain of Sunrisers Hyderabad for the 2023 season of the IPL.

=== 2024 season ===
The Sunrisers defended their title to become champions for a second time. They beat Durban's Super Giants by 89 runs in the final at Cape Town.

=== 2025 season ===
The season started poorly, with the Sunrisers losing their first three games, and after four games they were bottom of the log. However, they finished strongly, ending in third place and qualifying for the Eliminator.

In the knockout rounds, they defeated Joburg Super Kings in the Eliminator and then Paarl Royals in the 2nd Qualifier. However, they were comprehensively defeated by MI Cape Town in the final.

== Home ground ==
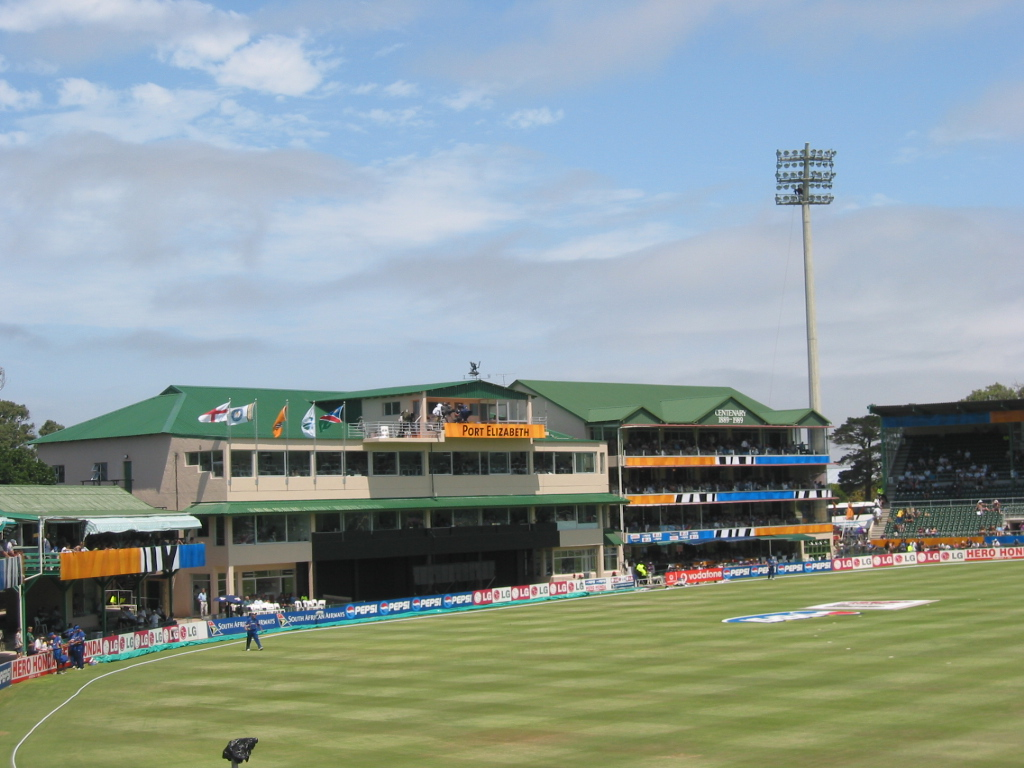
St George's Park Cricket Ground, the home ground of Sunrisers Eastern Cape

Sunrisers Eastern Cape play their home matches at St George's Park Cricket Ground in Gqeberha, Eastern Cape, South Africa. The stadium, established in 1882, is one of the oldest cricket grounds in the country and has a seating capacity of approximately 19,000 spectators. It has hosted international Test, One Day International (ODI), and Twenty20 International (T20I) matches, as well as domestic competitions. Since the inaugural SA20 season in 2023, St George's Park has served as the home venue of Sunrisers Eastern Cape and is renowned for its vibrant atmosphere, with the club's supporters, known as the Orange Army, creating one of the most distinctive match-day experiences in the league.

The venue has witnessed several memorable moments in the franchise's history, including numerous home victories during their championship-winning SA20 campaigns. The ground is also known for its pace-friendly conditions, particularly under lights, which often provide assistance to fast bowlers while remaining conducive to stroke play as the innings progresses.

== Current squad ==
- Players with international caps are listed in **bold**.

Sunrisers Eastern Cape roster
Name	Nat.	Date of Birth	Batting Style	Bowling Style	Year signed	Notes
Batters
**Matthew Breetzke**	South Africa	November 3, 1998 (age 28)	Right-handed	Right-arm medium	2025	
Jordan Hermann	South Africa	May 10, 2001 (age 25)	Left-handed	Right-arm off break	2025	
Mitchell van Buuren	South Africa	September 7, 1998 (age 28)	Right-handed	Right-arm medium	2025	
James Coles	England	September 11, 2004 (age 22)	Left-handed	Slow left-arm orthodox	2025	
CJ King	South Africa				2025	
JP King	South Africa				2025	
All-rounders
**Marco Jansen**	South Africa	May 1, 2000 (age 26)	Left-handed	Left-arm fast	2023	
**Mitchell Marsh**	Australia	October 20, 1991 (age 35)	Right-handed	Right-arm fast-medium	2026	Pre-signing
Patrick Kruger	South Africa	February 3, 1995 (age 31)	Right-handed	Right-arm medium-fast	2025	
**Lewis Gregory**	England	May 24, 1992 (age 34)	Right-handed	Right-arm medium-fast	2025	
Senuran Muthusamy	South Africa	February 22, 1994 (age 32)	Left-handed	Slow left-arm orthodox	2025	
Wicket-keepers
**Tristan Stubbs**	South Africa	August 14, 2000 (age 26)	Right-handed	Right-arm off break	2025	Captain
**Quinton de Kock**	South Africa	December 17, 1992 (age 33)	Left-handed		2025	
Bowlers
**Adam Milne**	New Zealand	April 13, 1992 (age 34)	Right-handed	Right-arm fast	2025	
**Anrich Nortje**	South Africa	November 16, 1993 (age 32)	Right-handed	Right-arm fast	2025	
**Lutho Sipamla**	South Africa	May 12, 1998 (age 28)	Right-handed	Right-arm fast-medium	2025	
**Rishad Hossain**	Bangladesh	July 15, 2002 (age 24)	Right-handed	Right-arm leg break	2026	Pre-signing

== Administration and support staff ==
Sunrisers Eastern Cape staff
Position	Name
Head Coach	Adrian Birrell
Assistant Coach	Russell Domingo
Batting Coach	Baakier Abrahams
Bowling Coach	Charl Langeveldt
Fielding Coach	Jimmy Kgamadi

== Seasons ==
=== Summaries ===
Season	W–L	Pos.	Finals	Coach	Captain	Most Runs	Most Wickets	Refs
2023	4–5 (1 NR)	3rd	C	Adrian Birrell	Aiden Markram	Aiden Markram (366)	Roelof van der Merwe (20)	
2024	7–3	1st	C	Adrian Birrell	Aiden Markram	Tom Abell (319)	Ottniel Baartman (18)	
2025	5–5	3rd	R	Adrian Birrell	Aiden Markram	David Bedingham (283)	Marco Jansen (19)	
2026	8–2	1st	C	Adrian Birrell	Tristan Stubbs	Quinton de Kock (390)	Anrich Nortje (18)	
2027

=== Tournament finishes ===
Year	League standing	Final standing
2023	3rd out of 6	Champions
2024	1st out of 6	Champions
2025	3rd out of 6	Runners up
2026	1st out of 6	Champions

- C: champions
- RU: runner-up
- SF team qualified for the semi-final stage of the competition

=== Season statistics ===
Year	Played	Wins	Losses	Tied/NR
2023	12	6	5	1
2024	12	9	2	1
2025	13	7	6	0
2026	13	7	4	2
2027
Source: ESPNCricinfo

Note:

- NR indicates No result.
- Abandoned matches are indicated as no result.

== Records and statistics ==
=== Most runs ===
Player	Match	Runs	Batting average	High score	100s	50s
Aiden Markram	36	967	34.53	100	1	5
Jordan Hermann	42	939	36.60	106*	1	4
Tristan Stubbs	48	915	36.60	66*	0	4
Marco Jansen	47	563	25.59	71*	0	3
Tom Abell	23	502	27.88	65	0	4

- Source: as of 26 January 2026

=== Most wickets ===
Player	Wickets	Bowling average	Best bowling
Marco Jansen	60	19.53	5/30
Ottniel Baartman	41	15.92	4/10
Liam Dawson	22	22.54	3/17
Roelof van der Merwe	20	9.55	6/20
Anrich Nortje	18	15.77	4/13

- Source: as of 26 January 2026

== Captains ==
List of Sunrisers Eastern Cape captains
Captain	Span	Mat	Won	Lost	Tied	NR	W–L%
Aiden Markram	2023–2025	36	22	13	0	1	61.11
Tristan Stubbs	2025–2026	12	7	4	0	1	58.33
