= Russell Domingo =

South African cricket coach (born 1974)

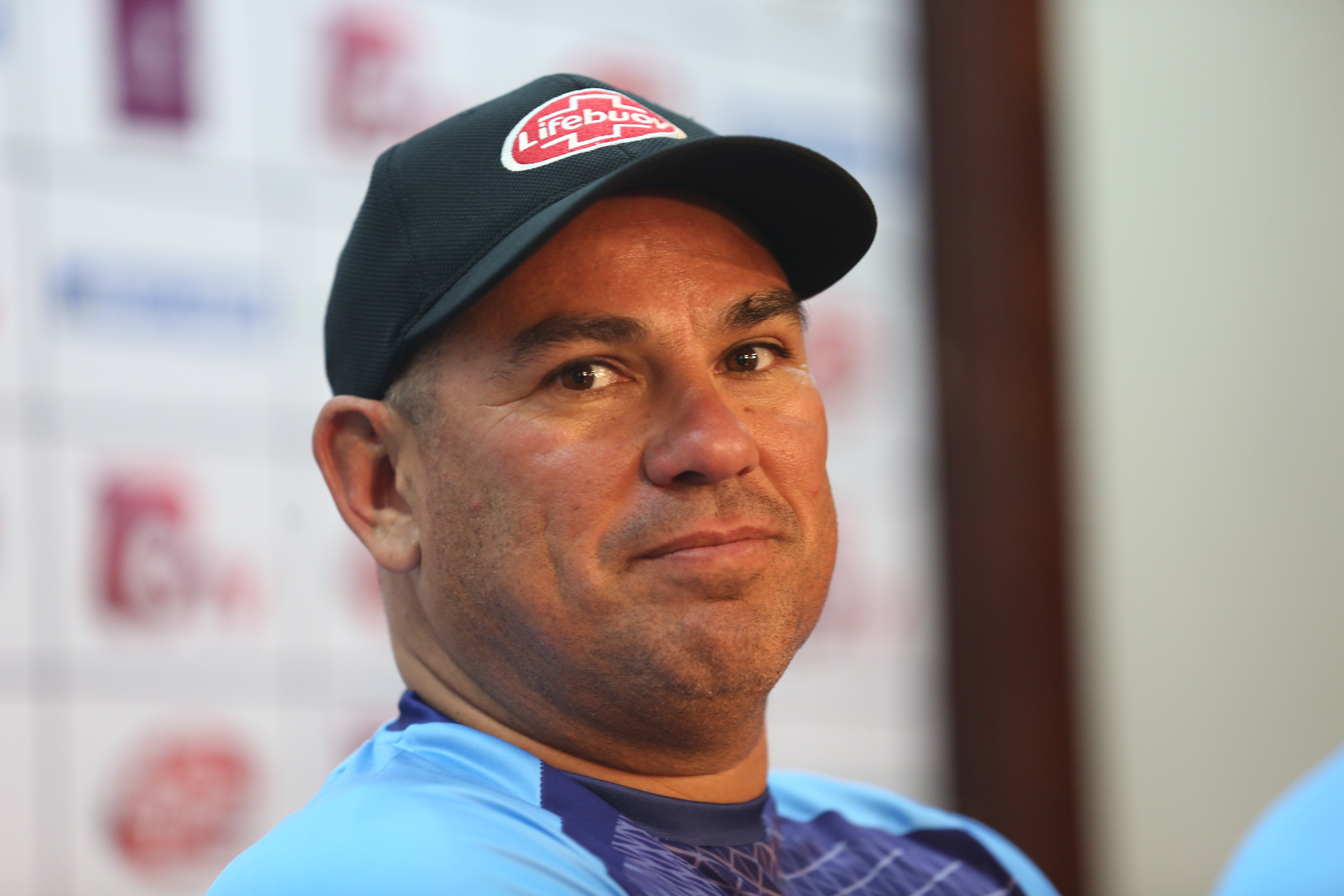

Personal information
- Full name: Russell Craig Domingo
- Born: 30 August 1974 (age 52); Port Elizabeth, South Africa
- Role: Bowler, Coach

Domestic team information
- Years: Team
- Eastern Province

Head coaching information
- Years: Team
- 2004–2005: South Africa u-19
- 2005–2011: Warriors
- 2013–2017: South Africa
- 2019–2022: Bangladesh
- 2023–: Lions
- 2025: Lahore Qalandars
- 2026–: Hampshire
- Source: ESPNcricinfo, 4 February 2016

Russell Craig Domingo (born 30 August 1974) is a South African cricket coach. He coached the South Africa national cricket team from 2012 to 2017 and the Bangladesh national cricket team from 2019 to 2022. In March 2025, he was appointed as the head coach of Pakistan Super League franchise Lahore Qalandars.

== Career ==
Domingo was born in Port Elizabeth, South Africa, and played for Eastern Province at colts (junior) level without ever breaking through into the senior team. He gained his first coaching qualification at the age of 22, and at the age of 25 was hired as a youth coach for Eastern Province. Having worked under Hylton Ackerman at South Africa's national academy, Domingo was appointed coach of the South African under-19s team at the 2004 Under-19 World Cup in Bangladesh. The following year, he took over from as the coach of the Warriors franchise, eventually leading the side to victory in the domestic one-day and Twenty20 competitions during the 2009–10 season. Domingo also coached the Warriors at the 2010 and 2011 editions of the Champions League Twenty20, with the franchise losing to the Chennai Super Kings in the final of the former.

In May 2010, Domingo was appointed coach of South Africa A for a tour of Bangladesh. He retained the position when Bangladesh A returned the tour the following year.

=== As South African cricket team coach ===
In June 2011, Domingo was appointed assistant coach of the senior national team, under the newly appointed senior coach Gary Kirsten. In December 2012, he took over from Kirsten as South Africa's Twenty20 International coach, with his first series being against New Zealand. At the time of his appointment, he and New Zealand coach Mike Hesson were the only national coaches not to have played professionally. In May 2013, Kirsten announced that he would resign as national coach at the end of July, with Domingo subsequently being announced as his replacement. He has since led South Africa to the semi-finals of the 2014 World Twenty20 and 2015 World Cup, and received a two-year contract extension in September 2014. In August 2017 CSA announced the appointment of Ottis Gibson as the new head coach of the Proteas, subsequently relegating Domingo to coaching the SA A team. He was also appointed head coach of the Pretoria Mavericks for the T20 GLOBAL LEAGUE in South Africa.

=== As head coach of the Bangladesh Cricket Team ===
Domingo was named Bangladesh head coach on 17 August 2019. He signed for two years. BCB president Nazmul Hassan said that Domingo's long-term planning and full-time availability played a big part in their decision. Domingo had been the only candidate to have travelled to Dhaka for his interview, impressing Hassan and some of the directors.

Under his coaching, Bangladesh registered their first ever T20I win over India in 2019. In May 2021, Bangladesh recorded their first ever bilateral series win against Sri Lanka. In August 2021, Bangladesh won a T20I series 4–1 against Australia, which was their first ever series win in any format against Australia. The following month, Bangladesh also defeated New Zealand 3–2, securing their first ever T20I series win against New Zealand.

In January 2022, Bangladesh won the first Test against New Zealand by eight wickets. It was Bangladesh's first win in Test cricket against New Zealand, and their first win in international cricket against New Zealand in New Zealand. In March 2022, Bangladesh beat South Africa 2–1 in an ODI series in South Africa, which was their first ever series win in South Africa.

Domingo's record as Bangladesh coach
	Matches	Won	Lost	Drawn/NR
Test	22	3	17	2
ODI	30	21	9	0
T20I	46	19	26	1

In December 2022, Domingo resigned as the Bangladesh head coach. He informed the BCB of his decision on Tuesday, just two days after Bangladesh's home Test series against India - which the hosts lost 2–0 - ended.

=== Coach of the Netherlands national team ===
In 2023, he was appointed as assistant coach of the Netherlands national cricket team for their South Africa and Zimbabwe tour.

=== Coach of Hampshire ===
In December 2025, Domingo was appointed as head coach of English county Hampshire for all formats.

Sporting positions
Preceded by Adrian Birrell	Hampshire cricket coach 2025–2026	Succeeded by TBA
