= Adrian Birrell =

South African cricketer and coach (born 1960)

Personal information
- Full name: Adrian Victor Birrell
- Born: 8 December 1960 (age 65); Grahamstown, Cape Province, South Africa
- Batting: Right-handed
- Bowling: Leg break
- Relatives: Harry Birrell (father)

Domestic team information
- Years: Team
- 1990: Country Districts
- 1985–1997: Eastern Province
- 1984–1997: Eastern Province B

Career statistics
Competition	FC	LA
Matches	45	6
Runs scored	1,460	69
Batting average	21.15	17.25
100s/50s	1/8	–/–
Top score	105	24*
Balls bowled	4,127	66
Wickets	75	–
Bowling average	30.16	–
5 wickets in innings	2	–
10 wickets in match	1	–
Best bowling	8/134	–
Catches/stumpings	35/–	1/–
- Source: Cricinfo, 25 March 2010

Adrian Victor "Adi" Birrell (born 8 December 1960 in Grahamstown, Cape Province) is a South African cricket coach and former first class cricketer. A leg break bowler, Birrell took 75 wickets at 30.16 in his career for Eastern Province, before turning to coaching.

He was educated at St Andrew's College in Grahamstown.

He led Ireland in the 2007 ICC Cricket World Cup where they reached the Super Eight Stage. In the tournament they beat two Test nations, Bangladesh and Pakistan as well as achieving a tie against Zimbabwe. He stepped down after the World Cup and was replaced as Ireland coach by Phil Simmons, but he continued to coach in Ireland. In 2013 he was appointed assistant national coach for South Africa. On 14 December 2018, Birrell was appointed first team manager at Hampshire County Cricket Club. In September 2025, he announced he would be leaving Hampshire at the end of that year's county season.

Sporting positions
Preceded by Craig White	Hampshire cricket coach 2018–2025	Succeeded by Russell Domingo
