= Ottniel Baartman =

South African cricketer (born 1993)

Personal information
- Full name: Ottniel Emile Graham Baartman
- Born: 18 March 1993 (age 33); Oudtshoorn, South Africa
- Batting: Right-handed
- Bowling: Right arm fast-medium
- Role: Bowler

International information
- National side: South Africa (2024–present)
- ODI debut (cap 152): 2 October 2024 v Ireland
- Last ODI: 6 December 2025 v India
- T20I debut (cap 102): 23 May 2024 v West Indies
- Last T20I: 11 December 2025 v India

Domestic team information
- Years: Team
- 2015–2017: South Western Districts
- 2018–2021: Dolphins
- 2018–2019: Knights
- 2018–2020: Northern Cape
- 2021–present: KwaZulu-Natal
- 2023–present: Sunrisers Eastern Cape
- 2024: Texas Super Kings

Career statistics
Competition	ODI	T20I	FC	LA
Matches	6	15	42	52
Runs scored	16	13	168	75
Batting average	16.00	4.33	5.60	6.25
100s/50s	0/0	0/0	0/0	0/0
Top score	10*	12	23	14
Balls bowled	252	306	6,236	2,159
Wickets	8	21	115	73
Bowling average	27.62	19.14	27.18	23.71
5 wickets in innings	0	0	2	0
10 wickets in match	0	0	1	0
Best bowling	2/32	4/11	7/27	4/24
Catches/stumpings	2/–	4/–	16/–	7/–
Medal record
Men's Cricket
Representing South Africa
ICC T20 World Cup
Runner-up	2024 West Indies & USA
- Source: ESPNcricinfo, 11 December 2025

Ottniel Emile Graham Baartman (Note: CricInfo currently lists Baartman's first name as Ottneil, however the majority of other sources and players social media list his name as Ottniel.) (born 18 March 1993) is a South African cricketer. He made his first-class debut for South Western Districts in the 2014–15 Sunfoil 3-Day Cup on 22 January 2015. In September 2018, he was named in Northern Cape's squad for the 2018 Africa T20 Cup. In September 2019, he was named in Northern Cape's squad for the 2019–20 CSA Provincial T20 Cup.

In January 2021, Baartman was named in South Africa's Test squad for their series against Pakistan. However, later the same month, he was ruled out of the tour due to a medical reason. In April 2021, he was named in KwaZulu-Natal's squad, ahead of the 2021–22 cricket season in South Africa.

Baartman was a part of the Sunrisers Eastern Cape squad that won the 2022–23 and 2023–24 SA20 seasons.

In May 2024, Baartman was named in South Africa's squad for the 2024 T20 World Cup tournament. He took a wicket with his first ball of the tournament in a game against Sri Lanka.

In May 2024, he was signed for Hampshire for six T20 Blast games as a replacement for Naveen-ul-Haq. Due to problems with his visa Baartman's stint was cancelled without playing a game for the team.

In July 2024, Baartman signed for the Texas Super Kings for the 2024 edition of the Major League Cricket tournament as an injury for Gerald Coetzee.

In January 2026, he became only the second bowler to take hattrick in SA20 history after Lungi Ngidi. Baartman achieved the feat during clash between Paarl Royals & Pretoria Capitals.
