= Quinton de Kock =

South African cricketer (born 1992)

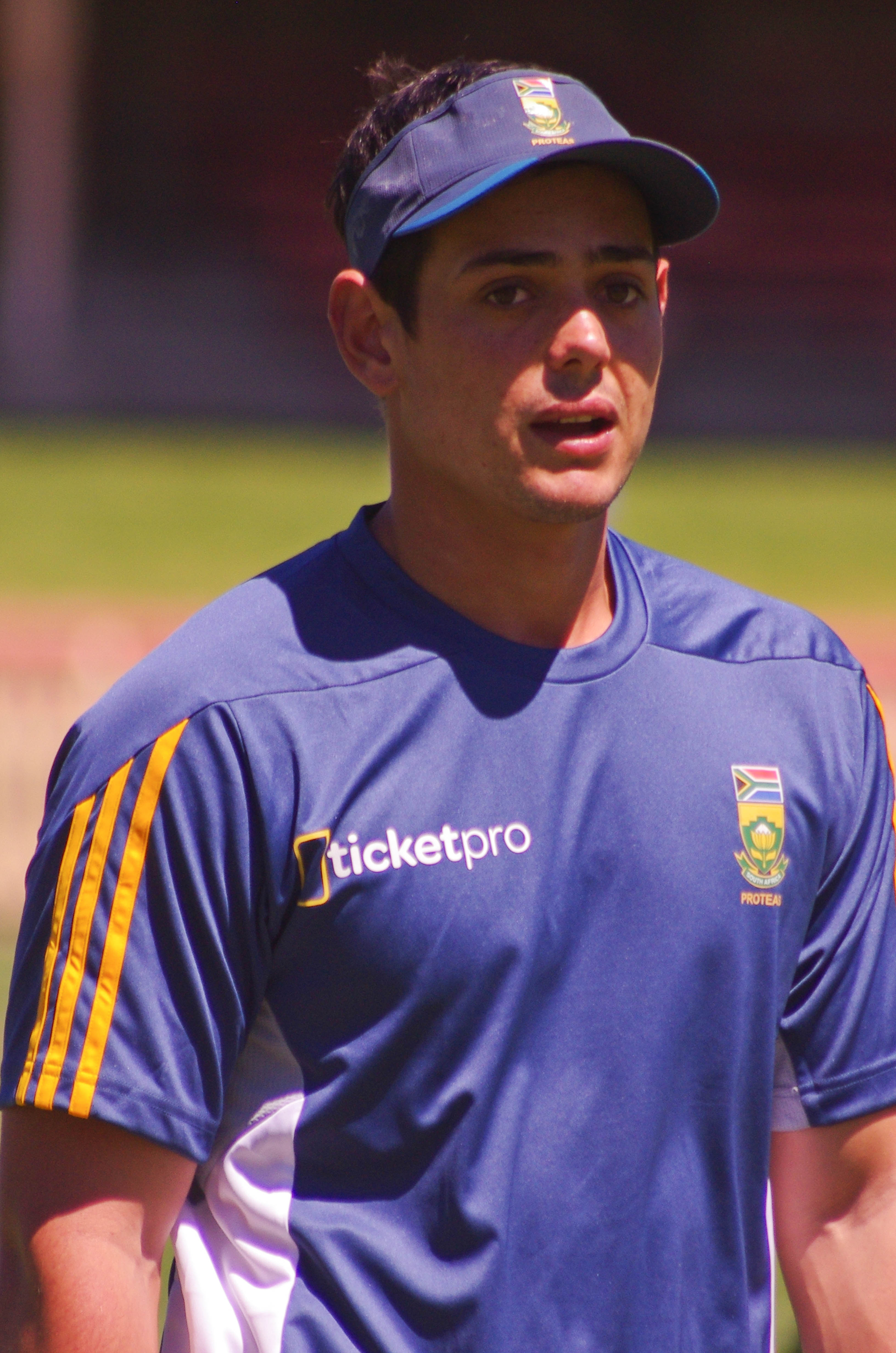
- De Kock training with South Africa in 2014

Personal information
- Born: 17 December 1992 (age 33); Johannesburg, Transvaal, South Africa
- Nickname: Quinny
- Height: 1.70 m (5 ft 7 in)
- Batting: Left-handed
- Role: Wicket-keeper

International information
- National side: South Africa (2012–present)
- Test debut (cap 317): 20 February 2014 v Australia
- Last Test: 26 December 2021 v India
- ODI debut (cap 105): 19 January 2013 v New Zealand
- Last ODI: 24 September 2026 v Australia
- ODI shirt no.: 12
- T20I debut (cap 54): 21 December 2012 v New Zealand
- Last T20I: 4 March 2026 v New Zealand
- T20I shirt no.: 12

Domestic team information
- Years: Team
- 2009/10–2011/12: Gauteng
- 2010/11–2014/15: Lions
- 2013: Sunrisers Hyderabad
- 2014–2016: Delhi Daredevils
- 2015/16–2017/18: Easterns
- 2015/16–2020/21: Titans
- 2018: Royal Challengers Bangalore
- 2018–2019: Cape Town Blitz
- 2019–2021,2026: Mumbai Indians
- 2021/22: Northerns
- 2022–2024: Lucknow Super Giants
- 2022, 2024–present: Barbados Royals
- 2023–2025: Durban's Super Giants
- 2025-: Sunrisers Eastern Cape
- 2023/24: Melbourne Renegades
- 2025: Kolkata Knight Riders
- 2025: MI New York

Career statistics
Competition	Test	ODI	T20I	FC
Matches	54	164	110	84
Runs scored	3,300	7,152	3,095	5,463
Batting average	38.82	45.84	30.95	41.38
100s/50s	6/22	23/32	2/19	12/36
Top score	141*	178	115	194
Catches/stumpings	221/11	214/18	98/19	323/16
Medal record
Men's cricket
Representing South Africa
ICC T20 World Cup
Runner-up	2024 West Indies & USA
- Source: ESPNcricinfo, 2 October 2026

Quinton de Kock (born 17 December 1992) is a South African international cricketer and former captain of the South Africa national team in all three formats. He currently plays for Titans at the domestic level and for South Africa in white ball cricket. He was named the Cricketer of the Year at Cricket South Africa's 2017 Annual Awards, and is considered as one of the best wicket keeper batsmen of his generation. An opening batsman and wicket-keeper, de Kock made his domestic debut for the Highveld Lions during the 2012/2013 season. He quickly caught the national selectors' eye when he starred in a match-winning partnership with Neil McKenzie in the Champions League T20 against the Mumbai Indians in the Indian Premier League (IPL). He also finished fourth on the first-class rankings, despite playing only six of the 10 matches that summer.

De Kock made his international debut in the first match of South Africa's home Twenty20 International series against the touring New Zealanders during the 2012/13 season. He was asked to keep wickets in place of AB de Villiers, who asked to be rested. He has since played regularly for the team at both One Day International (ODI) and Twenty20 International (T20I) level. In February 2014, he also made his Test debut for South Africa, playing solely as a batsman.

By his 20th ODI match, de Kock had already scored five centuries. He became the fourth player to score three successive one-day centuries and the second player to score four ODI centuries before his 21st birthday. In his 74th ODI, against Sri Lanka on 10 February 2017, he became the fastest player to complete 12 ODI hundreds, bettering Hashim Amla, who had achieved the landmark in 81 innings.

Before joining the Titans in 2015, de Kock played domestic cricket for Gauteng and the Highveld Lions. He has also played in the Indian Premier League (IPL) for Sunrisers Hyderabad, Delhi Daredevils, Royal Challengers Bangalore, and Mumbai Indians. Although he opens the batting in One Day International and T20 cricket, he primarily bats in the middle order in Test cricket. In July 2020, he was named South Africa's Men's Cricketer of the Year at Cricket South Africa's annual awards ceremony. In December 2020, in the series against Sri Lanka, de Kock captained South Africa for the first time in Test cricket.

== Early career ==
De Kock attended King Edward VII School in Johannesburg. He was spotted as a schoolboy talent and used to play for the affiliate club Old Eds. In the 2012 ICC Under-19 Cricket World Cup, he scored 95 off 131 balls in South Africa's first match against Bangladesh, which the team won by 133 runs. In the second match against Namibia, he scored 126 off 106 balls, with South Africa winning again, by 209 runs. In the quarter-final match against England, de Kock scored only 7 runs, but performed well as wicket-keeper, recording five dismissals (two stumpings and three catches). Overall, de Kock scored 284 runs throughout the tournament, ranking fourth for the tournament.

== Domestic and franchise career ==
From Johannesburg, de Kock debuted for Gauteng's senior team during the 2009–10 season, aged 16, and subsequently represented the national under-19 team at the 2012 Under-19 World Cup. In April 2021, he was named in Northerns' squad, ahead of the 2021–22 cricket season in South Africa.

In the 2013 domestic twenty20 tournament in South Africa, de Kock played several good knocks to take his team Highveld Lions to the final where they won, eventually becoming the season dalla champions. On 18 February 2013, in the same tournament against Cape Cobras he hit the second highest T20 score of 126 in South Africa. His knock of 126 is also the highest T20 score ever made by a wicketkeeper batsman in an innings (126).

In 2013 de Kock was bought by Indian Premier League franchise Sunrisers Hyderabad in the player auction, but had a disappointing tournament featuring three times and scoring only six runs. He signed for Delhi Daredevils for the 2014 tournament, going on to play for the team until 2017 and scoring a century in 2016. He was bought by Royal Challengers Bangalore in 2018 auction and played for Mumbai Indians in the 2019 season. He was the team's highest run scorer during their championship winning season. In 2021, he was drafted by Southern Brave for the inaugural season of The Hundred. He was second highest run scorer for Southern Brave, scoring 202 runs in 9 matches.

In the 2022 IPL auction, de Kock was bought by Lucknow Super Giants. He scored his second IPL century on 18 May 2022 against the Kolkata Knight riders, with 140 runs in 70 balls. In April 2022, he was bought by the Southern Brave for the 2022 season of The Hundred in England.

In November 2023, de Kock was included in the Pakistan Super League draft. He was drafted by Melbourne Renegades for Big Bash League for the first time. He also played for Delhi Bulls in T10 format.

In November 2024, he was bought by Kolkata Knight Riders in 2025 IPL auction. He made 97 not out from 61 balls against RR.

De Kock was bought by former franchise Mumbai Indians in the 2026 IPL auction for his base price of INR 1 crore.

== International career ==
=== ODI cricket ===
De Kock represented South Africa for the first time, at T20 level, on 21 December 2012 against New Zealand. While South Africa crushed New Zealand and got them all out for only 86, the hosts chased it down easily with 8 wickets still remaining. De Kock made an impression on his first appearance by scoring an unbeaten 28 off 23 while chasing. He also kept wicket and gloved two catches. De Kock made his debut for the South African ODI team on 19 January 2013, against New Zealand at Boland Park Stadium, Paarl, South Africa. It was reported that he was training and grooming under veteran retired South African wicket-keeper batsman Mark Boucher ahead of the ODI series against New Zealand. He was promoted to the opening batting spot from his second match onwards with Graeme Smith in his debut series.

In November 2013, de Kock was selected in the first XI of South Africa against Pakistan in the United Arab Emirates, in place of Colin Ingram. De Kock scored a match winning 112 off 135 balls on a tough batting track in Abu Dhabi in the fourth ODI to reach his maiden ODI century. South Africa won the ODI series 4–1. They also played two T20 games against Pakistan. De Kock scored 48 not out in the first match while chasing and took them home. They won that T20 series too by 2–0.

On 5 December 2013, de Kock scored 135 against India at his home ground in Johannesburg. His innings guided the team to a 141-run victory over India and he was awarded his first-ever 'Man of the Match' award in One Day International cricket. He followed his performance with another successive ODI ton in the next match against the same team in Durban. He scored 106 runs making a record-breaking opening stand of 194 in Durban with teammate Hashim Amla who also scored a century in the same match. This performance awarded him another 'Man of the Match' award while they already won the series beating India by 134 runs. He again broke a century knock of 101 in the 3rd ODI which was later abandoned due to rain, but he became only the fifth person to achieve this feat of three consecutive centuries in One Day Internationals, after Zaheer Abbas, Saeed Anwar, Herschelle Gibbs and AB de Villiers. He also became the highest run-getter ever in a three-match bilateral ODI series, breaking the previous record of Martin Guptill. Meanwhile, he was awarded the 'Man of the Series'.

De Kock scored his 5th ODI century knock of 128 against Sri Lanka to record their first-ever ODI series win in Sri Lanka. He also scored his maiden test fifty in the series.

In the 3-match tour to Zimbabwe in August, 2014, de Kock eventually became the joint quickest batsman to reach 1000 runs in ODI cricket sharing the record with Viv Richards, Jonathan Trott and Kevin Pietersen. He reached the milestone in 21 innings. He was also awarded the 'Player of the Series' in that tournament where South Africa beat Zimbabwe 3–0.

For his performances in 2014, de Kock was named in the World ODI XI by ICC. He was also named as wicket keeper of the ODI XI in 2016 by ICC and ESPNcricinfo. de Kock was named in South Africa's squad for the 2015 Cricket World Cup and it also marked his maiden appearance in a World Cup tournament. He endured a poor outing at his debut World Cup campaign aggregating only 145 runs in 8 matches at dismal average of 20.7 and coped up with criticism for his horrible batting display.

In the ODI series against Bangladesh in 2017, de Kock along with Hashim Amla set the highest record ODI runstand for South Africa with an unbeaten partnership of 282 runs. This is also the highest-ever partnership in One-Day Internationals without losing any wickets. For his performances in 2017, he was named as wicket keeper of the World ODI XI by ICC.

In April 2019, he was named in South Africa's squad for the 2019 Cricket World Cup. The International Cricket Council (ICC) named de Kock as the key player of South Africa's squad for the tournament. In the opening match of the World Cup against England, he scored 68. He ultimately finished with 305 runs from 8 matches, including three half centuries and his performance at 2019 World Cup was far better than his appearance at the previous World Cup edition in 2015.

On 4 February 2020, during the home ODI series against England de Kock scored his 15th ODI century and became joint second fastest South African to reach 5,000 ODI runs. In the same match he also became only the second wicket keeper opening batsman after Adam Gilchrist while captaining the team to score a century in ODIs.

==== 2023 Cricket World Cup ====
Prior to the start of the 2023 Cricket World Cup, de Kock announced that he would retire from the ODI format following the end of the 2023 World Cup. Quinton de Kock started the World Cup on a strong note by hammering his first ever World Cup century during South Africa's opening match against Sri Lanka at Delhi which was held on 7 October 2023. He scored 100 off just 84 deliveries against Sri Lanka and his knock included 12 fours and three sixes. He was one of three centurions for South Africa in their opening fixture against Sri Lanka and South Africa cruised to the highest ever team total scored by a team in World Cup history by smashing 428/5 in their allocated 50 overs. Quinton de Kock, Rassie van der Dussen and Aiden Markram became the first trio of batters to score centuries for a team in a World Cup match. During his marathon knock against Sri Lanka, he set the record for having the scored most ODI centuries by a player (17) before scoring his first ever World Cup century.

He scored his second consecutive World Cup century in South Africa's second group stage fixture against Australia and his knock at relatively slow outfield in Lucknow propelled South Africa to 311/7 runs on the board before restricting Australia to 177 all out to seal the deal and de Kock received the Player of the Match Award for his splendid knock of 109 which came off just 106 deliveries. He became only the second South African to score back-to-back centuries in a single edition of the World Cup after AB de Villiers's feat at the 2011 World Cup.

He made his 150th ODI appearance during South Africa's group stage match against Bangladesh at Mumbai and he smashed his career best knock of 174 which came off just 130 deliveries and it was also de Kock's third century at the 2023 World Cup in five innings. It was his 20th century in his ODI career and his knock propelled South Africa to 382/5 in 50 overs before restricting Bangladesh to 233. He also broke the record of Adam Gilchrist for registering the highest ever individual score by a designated specialist wicket-keeper batsman in a World Cup match as the latter's 149 which came at 2007 World Cup final stood as the record for 16 years. He also became the first designated wicket-keeper batter to have scored 150 or more in an ODI on three occasions and also set the record for the most 150 scores by a designated keeper in ODI cricket (3). He also became the first South African batsman to score three centuries in a single edition of the World Cup when he reached to the milestone against Bangladesh. His knock of 174 against Bangladesh was also the second highest individual score for South Africa in Cricket World Cup history behind Gary Kirsten's unbeaten 188 which came during the 1996 Cricket World Cup.

He scored his fourth World Cup century during the group stage match against New Zealand at Pune. His innings of 114 propelled South Africa to 357/4 in their allotted 50 overs and South Africa won the game comfortably by 190 runs. de Kock also became the first South African batter to score 500 runs or more in a single edition of the World Cup and he also surpassed Jacques Kallis's record of 485 runs (2007) to become the most prolific runscorer for South Africa in a single edition of the World Cup. de Kock also became the first batsman to reach 500 runs during the 2023 World Cup global showpiece. He also became only the third player in Cricket World Cup history to score four centuries in a single edition of a World Cup after Kumar Sangakkara and Rohit Sharma.

He effected six dismissals as wicket-keeper in group stage match against South Africa and all six of the dismissals were catches. He eventually set the record for joint-most dismissals by a designated wicket-keeper in a World Cup game. He became only the third wicket-keeper to effect in 6 dismissals in a single World Cup match after Adam Gilchrist and Sarfaraz Ahmed. He also became only the second wicket-keeper to effect in six dismissals in ODI history on two occasions after Adam Gilchrist.

==== ODI comeback ====
On September 22, 2025, de Kock reversed his decision to retire from ODIs and was named in the Proteas ODI squad to tour Pakistan in November. This would be his first ODI appearance since his retirement after the 2023 Cricket World Cup.

In the first ODI, he scored 63 off 71 balls at the Iqbal Stadium in Faisalabad. In the Second ODI , he scored a match winning 123* off 119, smashing 8 fours and 7 sixes. Following his score of 53 in the final ODI, he ended the series with 239 runs and was subsequently named Player of the Series.

He was then named in the Proteas ODI squad to face India in November/December 2025. His 106(89) in the 3rd ODI came in vain, as South Africa lost the match, and the series 2-1, to India. He did however equal Sanath Jayasuriya's record of Most ODI Centuries against India (7).

On September 7, 2026, he was named on the Proteas ODI squad to face Australia in South Africa.

On November 20, 2026, he was named in the Proteas ODI squad for the Bangladesh Tour of South Africa.

=== Test cricket ===
In February 2014, de Kock made his Test debut for South Africa, scoring seven runs in the first innings and 34 runs in the second innings against Australia at St George's Oval in Port Elizabeth.

In January 2016, when South Africa was losing the home Test series against England, de Kock was recalled to the Test team for the second Test, taking the keeper's gloves from AB de Villiers, but failed to deliver. He was replaced by Dane Vilas at the 11th hour before the third Test, after a freak injury he picked up at home the afternoon before. He was again selected for the fourth and the final Test and scored his debut Test century with a score of 129 not out in the first innings coming to bat at number seven. In the tour, de Kock reached a milestone as the fastest to reach 10 ODI centuries. He completed his 10th century in his 55th match. In their 3rd test against Pakistan he made his same score of 129 in their 2nd innings in 2019.

On 22 July 2018 during the second test match against Sri Lanka, he went on to become the fastest wicketkeeper in terms of matches (35) to take 150 test dismissals. On 27 January 2019 during the fourth test match against England, he broke the record for the fastest wicketkeeper to effect 200 dismissals (47).

On 12 June 2021, Quinton de Kock joined Mark Boucher in 3,000 runs in Test cricket as a wicketkeeper for South Africa club during his career-best 141 not-out against West Indies.

On 30 December 2021, de Kock announced his retirement from Test cricket.

=== T20I cricket ===
In March 2014, South Africa played a 3-match Twenty20 series against Australia. De Kock was named the 'Player of the Series' in the tournament although South Africa lost the series by 0–2. In 2019–2020 season de Kock was brilliant in this format scoring 4 half centuries. In September 2021, de Kock was named in South Africa's squad for the 2021 ICC Men's T20 World Cup.

In October 2021, during the Men's T20 World Cup, de Kock made himself unavailable for South Africa's match against West Indies after refusing to take the knee. Following the match, he apologised saying he would take the knee and wanted to play for his country again. De Kock explained that he had originally decided not to take the knee because of the way in which Cricket South Africa had handled the issue by mandating that all players take the knee shortly before the match against the West Indies. However, he returned to the team for South Africa's next match, against Sri Lanka, and took the knee before the start of play.

On 26 March 2023, in the second T20I against the West Indies, he scored his maiden century in T20I cricket. He completed his half-century in just 15 balls, recording the fastest fifty by a South African cricketer.

==== 2024 ICC Men's T20 World Cup ====
In May 2024, he was named in South Africa’s squad for the 2024 ICC Men's T20 World Cup tournament. After a slow start to the tournament, his blistering knock of 74 from just 40 deliveries against the United States in the Super 8 stage propelled South Africa to 194/4 in 20 overs. The Proteas won that match by 18 runs, restricting the co-hosts to 176/6.

He scored his second consecutive 50 in the Super 8, smashing 65(38) against England, taking his team to 163/6. South Africa held their nerve, winning by 7 runs. South Africa reached their first ever World Cup Final, beating Afghanistan in the semi final.

De Kock scored 39(31) in the final as the Proteas fell 7 runs short against India, scoring 169/8 in response to India's 176/7.

After the tournament, de Kock went on a hiatus from international cricket.

==== Return to National Team ====
On September 22, 2025, de Kock was named in the Proteas T20I squad to tour Pakistan in October and November, as well as the T20I squad for a one-off T20I against Namibia. This would be his first international appearance for the Proteas since the 2024 ICC Men's T20 World Cup Final in June 2024.

He failed to capitalise in the T20I series, scoring 30 runs across 3 matches.

In November 2025, he was named in the Proteas T20I squad to face India in December.

In the second T20I at New Chandigarh, he scored a match winning 90(46), smashing 7 sixes, and was subsequently named Player of the Match.

==== 2026 ICC Men's T20 World Cup ====
In January 2026, he was named in the 15 man South Africa squad to take part in the T20 World Cup to be held in India and Sri Lanka.

== Personal life ==
De Kock married Sasha Hurly in September 2016. They have a daughter, born in January 2022.

== Records and achievements ==
=== Milestones ===
- Fastest South African to reach 1,000 ODI runs.
- Fastest wicketkeeper, in terms of matches (35), to make 150 Test dismissals.
- Fastest wicketkeeper, in terms of matches, to complete 200 dismissals in Tests (47) beating the previous record held by Adam Gilchrist.
- Fastest South African to score a T20I half century (15 balls).

=== International centuries ===
As of August 2026, Quinton de Kock has scored 6 Test centuries, 23 ODI centuries and two T20I centuries, totaling 31 centuries in his international career.
