= Durban's Super Giants =

South African franchise cricket team

Durban Super Giants
- League: SA20

Personnel
- Captain: Aiden Markram
- Coach: Lance Klusener
- Owner: RP-Sanjiv Goenka Group

Team information
- City: Durban, KwaZulu-Natal, South Africa
- Founded: 2023; 3 years ago
- Home ground: Kingsmead Cricket Ground, Durban
- Capacity: 25,000

History
- Twenty20 debut: v. Joburg Super Kings at Kingsmead Cricket Ground, Durban; 11 January 2023
- Official website: durbanssupergiants.com
T20I kit

Durban Super Giants (DSG) is a South African professional Twenty20 franchise cricket team that first competed in the inaugural season of the SA20 tournament. The team is based in Durban and was formed in 2022. The team's home-ground is the Kingsmead Cricket Ground. The team is coached by Lance Klusener.

The franchise is owned by RP-Sanjiv Goenka Group, which also owns Indian Premier League team Lucknow Super Giants.

== History ==
In August 2022, Cricket South Africa announced the establishment of the SA20, a Twenty20 Cricket competition to be started in 2023. The teams for the competition, representing six different cities, including Durban, were put up on auction in South Africa in September 2022. The Durban franchise was purchased by RP-Sanjiv Goenka Group.

== Current squad ==
- Players with international caps are listed in **bold**.
- * denotes a player who was unavailable for the season.

No.	Name	Nat.	Birth date	Batting style	Bowling style	Notes
Batters
Wicket-keepers
	**Heinrich Klaasen**	(South Africa)	30 July 1991 (age 35)	Right-handed	Right-arm off break	
	**Devon Conway**	(New Zealand)	8 September 1991 (age 35)	Left-handed	Right-arm medium	Overseas
	**Jos Buttler**	(England)	8 September 1990 (age 36)	Right-handed	Right-arm medium	Overseas
All-rounders
	**Aiden Markram**	(South Africa)	4 October 1994 (age 32)	Right-handed	Right-arm off break	
	**Sunil Narine**	(Cricket West Indies)	26 May 1988 (age 38)	Left-handed	Right-arm off break	Overseas
	Evan Jones	(South Africa)	1 December 1996 (age 29)	Right-handed	Right-arm medium-fast	
	**David Wiese**	(Namibia)	18 May 1985 (age 41)	Right-handed	Right-arm medium-fast	
	Dayyaan Galiem	(South Africa)	9 April 1997 (age 29)	Right-handed	Right-arm medium	
	Andile Simelane	(South Africa)	3 February 2004 (age 22)	Right-handed	Right-arm fast	
Bowlers
	Eathan Bosch	(South Africa)	27 April 1998 (age 28)	Right-handed	Right-arm medium-fast	
	**Gerald Coetzee**	(South Africa)	2 October 2000 (age 26)	Right-handed	Right-arm fast	
	**Simon Harmer**	(South Africa)	31 March 1989 (age 37)	Right-handed	Right-arm off break	
	**Taijul Islam**	(Bangladesh)	7 February 1992 (age 34)	Left-handed	Slow left-arm orthodox	Overseas
	**Noor Ahmad**	(Afghanistan)	3 January 2005 (age 21)	Left-handed	Left-arm wrist spin	Overseas
	Daryn Dupavillon	(South Africa)	15 July 1994 (age 32)	Right-handed	Right-arm medium-fast	
	**Lockie Ferguson**	(New Zealand)	13 June 1991 (age 35)	Right-handed	Right-arm fast	Overseas

== Administration and support staff ==
Position	Name
Director Of Cricket	(Australia) Tom Moody
Head coach	(South Africa) Lance Klusener
Assistant coach	(South Africa) Rivash Gobind
Fast Bowling Coach	(India) Bharat Arun
Spin Bowling Coach	(England) Carl Crowe
Fielding Coach	(South Africa) Ryan Cook
Source: DSG Staff

== Seasons ==
=== Seasons ===
Year	League standing	Final standing
2023	5th out of 6	League stage
2024	2nd out of 6	Runners up
2025	6th out of 6	League stage
2026	5th out of 6	League stage

- C: champions
- RU: runners-up
- SF team qualified for the semi-final stage of the competition

=== Season summary ===
Year	Played	Wins	Losses	Tied/NR
2023	10	4	5	1
2024	13	8	5	0
2025	10	2	6	2
2026	10	3	4	3
2027
Source: ESPNCricinfo

Note:

- NR indicates No result.
- Abandoned matches are indicated as no result.

== Statistics ==
=== Most runs ===
Player	Runs	Batting average	High score	100s	50s
Heinrich Klaasen	1146	36.96	104*	1	9
Matthew Breetzke	658	29.90	78	0	2
Quinton de Kock	643	22.96	83*	0	5
Wiaan Mulder	603	26.21	59	0	3
Kane Williamson	343	34.30	60*	0	2

Source: as of 20 Jan 2026

=== Most wickets ===
Player	Wickets	Bowling average	Best bowling
Noor Ahmad	30	17.86	5/11
Keshav Maharaj	27	27.03	2/17
Reece Topley	23	23.21	3/19
Dwaine Pretorius	21	21.76	2/9
Junior Dala	20	16.35	5/26

Source: as of 20 Jan 2026
