= South African cricket team against Ireland in the UAE in 2024–25 =

International cricket tour

	Ireland	South Africa
- Dates: 27 September – 7 October 2024
Captains	Paul Stirling	Temba Bavuma (ODIs) (Note: Rassie van der Dussen captained South Africa in the 3rd ODI.); Aiden Markram (T20Is)

One Day International series
- Results: South Africa won the 3-match series 2–1
Most runs	Paul Stirling (95)	Tristan Stubbs (211)
Most wickets	Craig Young (7)	Lizaad Williams (11)
- Player of the series: Lizaad Williams (SA)

Twenty20 International series
- Results: 2-match series drawn 1–1
Most runs	Ross Adair (118)	Ryan Rickelton (112)
Most wickets	Mark Adair (5)	Patrick Kruger (5)
- Player of the series: Ross Adair (Ire)

The South Africa cricket team toured the United Arab Emirates in September and October 2024 to play the Ireland cricket team. The tour consisted of two Twenty20 International (T20I) and three One Day International (ODI) matches. All the matches were played at the Sheikh Zayed Cricket Stadium in Abu Dhabi. In April 2024, Cricket Ireland confirmed the fixtures for the tour, as a part of the 2024 home international season.

== Squads ==
Ireland		South Africa	
ODIs	T20Is	ODIs	T20Is
Paul Stirling (c); Mark Adair; Andrew Balbirnie; Curtis Campher; George Dockrell; Stephen Doheny (wk); Gavin Hoey; Fionn Hand; Graham Hume; Matthew Humphreys; Andy McBrine; Neil Rock (wk); Harry Tector; Lorcan Tucker (wk); Craig Young	Paul Stirling (c); Mark Adair; Ross Adair; Curtis Campher; Gareth Delany; George Dockrell; Fionn Hand; Matthew Humphreys; Graham Hume; Neil Rock (wk); Harry Tector; Lorcan Tucker (wk); Ben White; Craig Young	Temba Bavuma (c); Ottniel Baartman; ~~Nandre Burger~~; Tony de Zorzi; Bjorn Fortuin; Wiaan Mulder; Lungi Ngidi; Nqaba Peter; Andile Phehlukwayo; Ryan Rickelton (wk); Jason Smith; Tristan Stubbs (wk); Rassie van der Dussen; Kyle Verreynne (wk); Lizaad Williams	Aiden Markram (c); Ottniel Baartman; Matthew Breetzke; Nandre Burger; Bjorn Fortuin; Reeza Hendricks; Patrick Kruger; Wiaan Mulder; Lungi Ngidi; Nqaba Peter; Ryan Rickelton (wk); Andile Simelane; Jason Smith; Tristan Stubbs (wk); Lizaad Williams

On 4 October, Nandre Burger was ruled out of the ODI series following a lumbar stress reaction. On 6 October 2024, Temba Bavuma was ruled out of the 3rd ODI due to elbow injury, with Reeza Hendricks was named as his replacement. Rassie van der Dussen was announced as the captain.

== T20I series ==
=== 1st T20I ===
27 September 2024
19:30 (N)
Scorecard

Ireland; 171/8 (20 overs)	v	South Africa; 174/2 (17.4 overs)
Curtis Campher 49 (36); Patrick Kruger 4/27 (4 overs)		Ryan Rickelton 76 (48); Craig Young 1/25 (3 overs)

South Africa won by 8 wickets
Sheikh Zayed Cricket Stadium, Abu Dhabi
Umpires: Mark Hawthorne (Ire) and Aidan Seaver (Ire)
Player of the match: Ryan Rickelton (SA)

- South Africa won the toss and elected to field.
- Reeza Hendricks (SA) scored his 2,000th run in T20Is.

=== 2nd T20I ===
29 September 2024
19:30 (N)
Scorecard

Ireland; 195/6 (20 overs)	v	South Africa; 185/9 (20 overs)
Ross Adair 100 (58); Wiaan Mulder 2/51 (4 overs)		Reeza Hendricks 51 (32); Mark Adair 4/31 (4 overs)

Ireland won by 10 runs
Sheikh Zayed Cricket Stadium, Abu Dhabi
Umpires: Roland Black (Ire) and Jonathan Kennedy (Ire)
Player of the match: Ross Adair (Ire)

- South Africa won the toss and elected to field.
- Ross Adair (Ire) scored his first century in T20Is.
- This was Ireland's first win against South Africa in men's T20Is.

== ODI series ==
=== 1st ODI ===
2 October 2024
15:30 (D/N)
Scorecard

South Africa; 271/9 (50 overs)	v	Ireland; 132 (31.5 overs)
Ryan Rickelton 91 (102); Mark Adair 4/50 (10 overs)		George Dockrell 21 (32); Lizaad Williams 4/32 (10 overs)

South Africa won by 139 runs
Sheikh Zayed Cricket Stadium, Abu Dhabi
Umpires: Roland Black (Ire) and Langton Rusere (Zim)
Player of the match: Ryan Rickelton (SA)

- South Africa won the toss and elected to bat.
- Gavin Hoey (Ire) and Ottniel Baartman (SA) both made their ODI debuts.

=== 2nd ODI ===
4 October 2024
15:30 (D/N)
Scorecard

South Africa; 343/4 (50 overs)	v	Ireland; 169 (30.3 overs)
Tristan Stubbs 112* (81); Curtis Campher 1/22 (3 overs)		Craig Young 29* (21); Lizaad Williams 3/36 (5 overs)

South Africa won by 174 runs
Sheikh Zayed Cricket Stadium, Abu Dhabi
Umpires: Richard Illingworth (Eng) and Aidan Seaver (Ire)

- South Africa won the toss and elected to bat.
- Tristan Stubbs (SA) scored his first century in ODIs.

=== 3rd ODI ===
7 October 2024
15:30 (D/N)
Scorecard

Ireland; 284/9 (50 overs)	v	South Africa; 215 (46.1 overs)
Paul Stirling 88 (92); Lizaad Williams 4/56 (10 overs)		Jason Smith 91 (93); Curtis Campher 3/28 (5 overs)

Ireland won by 69 runs
Sheikh Zayed Cricket Stadium, Abu Dhabi
Umpires: Roland Black (Ire) and Langton Rusere (Zim)
Player of the match: Paul Stirling (Ire)

- Ireland won the toss and elected to bat.
- Fionn Hand (Ire) made his ODI debut.
