= 2025 World Test Championship final =

Cricket match

2025 ICC World Test Championship final
- Event: 2023–2025 ICC World Test Championship
Australia	South Africa
212	138
&	&
207	282/5
- South Africa won by 5 wickets
- Date: 11–14 June 2025
- Venue: Lord's, London
- Player of the match: Aiden Markram (SA)
- Umpires: Chris Gaffaney (NZ); Richard Illingworth (Eng)

The 2025 ICC World Test Championship final was a Test cricket match played at Lord's, London from 11 to 14 June to determine the winner of the 2023–2025 ICC World Test Championship. It was played between Australia and South Africa. South Africa won the match by 5 wickets to win the third edition of the ICC World Test Championship. This marked South Africa's maiden win of the Championship. As winners, they received a cash prize of US$3.6 million, while the Australian team received a cash prize of US$2.1 million. This was also South Africa's first ICC title since 1998.

== Background ==
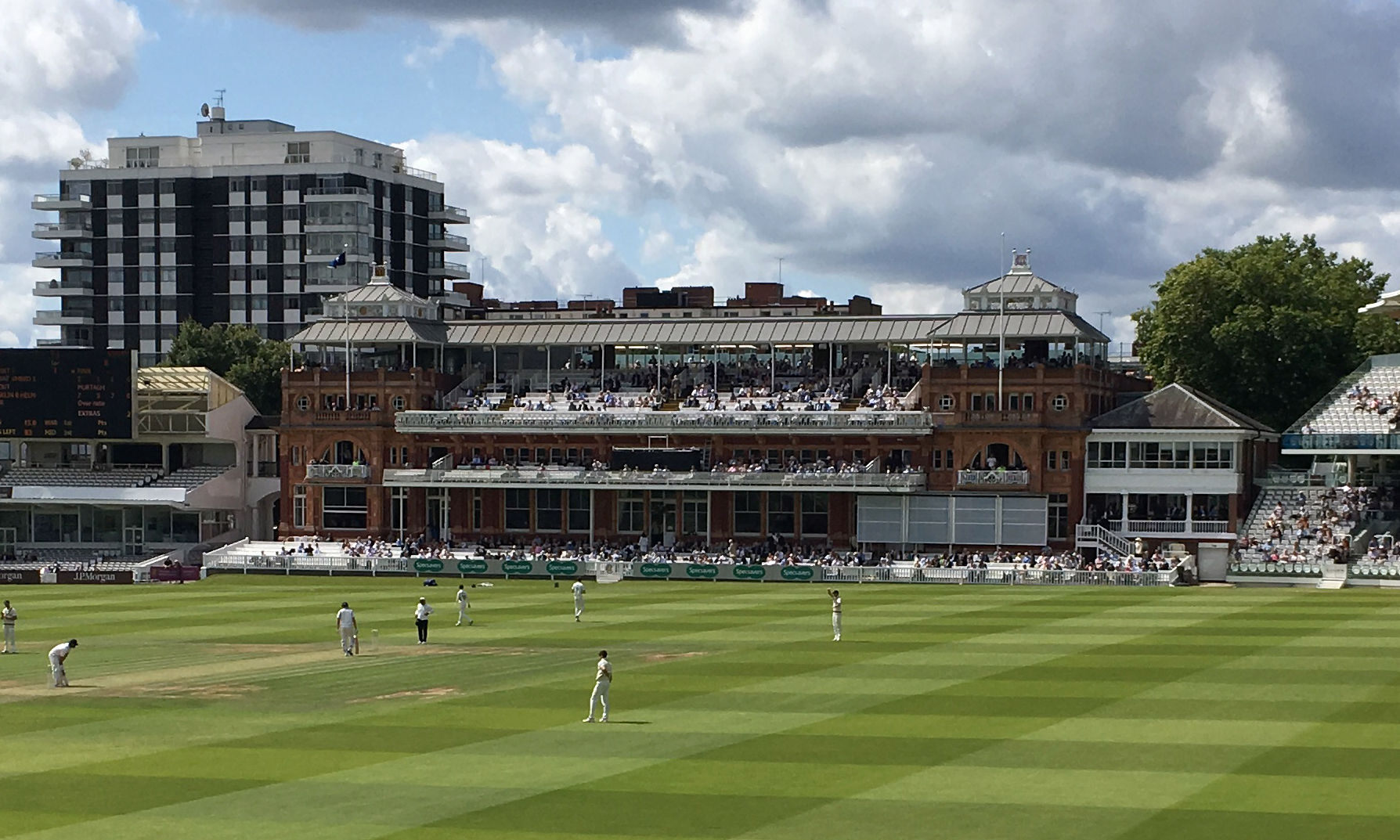
Panorama view of Lord's, London, the venue for the final

The points system remained unchanged from the previous edition. A team that was behind the required over rate at the end of a match would have one point deducted for each over it was behind. As in the previous edition, the teams are ranked in the league table based on percentage of total points won out of total points contested. In September 2022, the ICC announced that Lord's in London would host the 2025 ICC World Test Championship Final, the third consecutive time the final was taking place in England. In September 2024, the ICC confirmed that the final would take place from 11 to 15 June 2025, with a reserve day on 16 June.

During the 2023–2025 ICC World Test Championship, both South Africa and Australia emerged as the leading teams in terms of points. Going into the final Australia held the top position in the ICC Men's Test Team Rankings while South Africa secured the second spot. South Africa made their first-ever appearance in the WTC final, whereas Australia were the defending champions having won the previous edition against India in the 2023 final.

In May 2025, the ICC revealed the prize money for the final. The champions received USD $3.6 million while the runners-up received USD $2.16 million.

== Road to the final ==
=== Series results ===
Australia		Round	South Africa
Opponent	Result	League stage	Opponent	Result
England (A)	Australia 2–2 England	Series 1	India (H)	South Africa 1–1 India
Pakistan (H)	Australia 3–0 Pakistan	Series 2	New Zealand (A)	South Africa 0–2 New Zealand
West Indies (H)	Australia 1–1 West Indies	Series 3	West Indies (A)	South Africa 1–0 West Indies
New Zealand (A)	Australia 2–0 New Zealand	Series 4	Bangladesh (A)	South Africa 2–0 Bangladesh
India (H)	Australia 3–1 India	Series 5	Sri Lanka (H)	South Africa 2–0 Sri Lanka
Sri Lanka (A)	Australia 2–0 Sri Lanka	Series 6	Pakistan (H)	South Africa 2–0 Pakistan

=== Final standings ===
Pos.	Team	Matches				Ded.	Con.	Pts.	Pct.	Qualification
Pos.	Team	P	W	D	L	Ded.	Con.	Pts.	Pct.	Qualification
1	South Africa	12	8	1	3	0	144	100	69.44	Advanced to the final
2	Australia	19	13	2	4	10 (Note: Australia were deducted a total 10 points for a slow over-rate in the fourth Test against England.)	228	154	67.54	Advanced to the final
Source: International Cricket Council, ESPNcricinfo

- A win is worth 12 points. A draw is worth 4 points. A tie is worth 6 points.
- Points deductions:

== Squads ==
Australia	South Africa
Pat Cummins (c); Steve Smith (vc); Scott Boland; Alex Carey (wk); Cameron Green; Josh Hazlewood; Travis Head; Josh Inglis (wk); Usman Khawaja; Sam Konstas; Matthew Kuhnemann; Marnus Labuschagne; Nathan Lyon; Mitchell Starc; Beau Webster	Temba Bavuma (c); David Bedingham; Corbin Bosch; Tony de Zorzi; Marco Jansen; Keshav Maharaj; Aiden Markram; Wiaan Mulder; Senuran Muthusamy; Lungi Ngidi; Dane Paterson; Kagiso Rabada; Ryan Rickelton (wk); Tristan Stubbs; Kyle Verreynne (wk)

Australia also named Brendan Doggett as a travelling reserve.

== Match ==
=== Match officials ===
On 23 May 2025, the ICC announced the match officials for the final.

- On-field umpires: Chris Gaffaney (NZ) and Richard Illingworth (Eng)
- Third umpire: Richard Kettleborough (Eng)
- Reserve umpire: Nitin Menon (Ind)
- Match referee: Javagal Srinath (Ind)

=== Match details and scorecard ===
11–14 June 2025
Scorecard

Australia	v	South Africa
212 (56.4 overs); Beau Webster 72 (92); Kagiso Rabada 5/51 (15.4 overs)		138 (57.1 overs); David Bedingham 45 (111); Pat Cummins 6/28 (18.1 overs)
207 (65 overs); Mitchell Starc 58* (136); Kagiso Rabada 4/59 (18 overs)		282/5 (83.4 overs); Aiden Markram 136 (207); Mitchell Starc 3/66 (14.4 overs)

South Africa won by 5 wickets
Lord's, London
Umpires: Chris Gaffaney (NZ) and Richard Illingworth (Eng)
Player of the match: Aiden Markram (SA)

- South Africa won the toss and elected to field.
- Travis Head (Aus) surpassed Rohit Sharma to become the second-highest run-scorer in ICC finals in just 4 innings.
- Steve Smith (Aus) surpassed Sachin Tendulkar for most 50+ scores in ICC knockouts and set a record for the most Test runs at Lord's for a visiting batter with 591*, beating Warren Bardsley's 575.
- Kagiso Rabada (SA) became the first South African to take a five-wicket haul in a WTC final, the second overall after Kyle Jamieson, and only the second South African after Jacques Kallis to claim a five-wicket haul in a major ICC final.
- Mitchell Starc (Aus) surpassed Mohammed Shami for the highest number of wickets in major men's ICC tournament finals.
- Pat Cummins (Aus) took his 300th Test wicket, becoming the fifth fastest to do so by balls bowled (13,725). He became the first captain with a six-wicket haul in an ICC final, recorded best Test figures (6/28) by a captain, surpassing Bob Willis' 6/101, overtook Jasprit Bumrah as the leading wicket-taker in WTC 2023–25, and became joint-second for most Test five-wicket hauls as captain.
- Aiden Markram (SA) became the third player overall, and the first from South Africa, to score a century in the World Test Championship final.
- Temba Bavuma (SA) and Kane Williamson are the only captains to have scored 50 or more runs in a WTC Final.
- This was South Africa's first ICC title since 1998.

=== Match summary ===
==== Day 1 ====
In the first session, Australia had scored 67 runs for the loss of 4 wickets. At the end of second session, Australia managed to score 113 more runs for the loss of just 1 wicket with contributions from Steve Smith and Beau Webster. In the third session, Australia lost all their remaining wickets for only 22 runs. Webster was the highest run scorer with 72 off 92 balls while Kagiso Rabada picked up a five-wicket haul. At the end of day 1, South Africa had scored 43 runs for the loss of 4 wickets.

==== Day 2 ====
In the first session of day 2, South Africa scored 78 runs while losing only one wicket with contributions from David Bedingham and Temba Bavuma. After a rain-delay, South Africa finished their innings with 17 more runs while losing all the remaining wickets. Bedingham was the highest run scorrer, while Pat Cummins took a six-wicket haul. At the end of second session, Australia had scored 32 runs for the loss of 2 wickets. In third session, Australia scored 112 runs while losing six wickets with contributions from Alex Carey and Mitchell Starc.

==== Day 3 ====
In the first session of day 3, Australia finished their innings adding 63 runs while losing all their remaining wickets. Starc was the highest run scorer, while Rabada picked up a four-wicket haul. In the second session, South Africa scored 94 runs for the loss of 2 wickets. In the third session, South Africa scored 119 runs without losing any wickets with contributions from Aiden Markram and Bavuma.

==== Day 4 ====
In the first session of day 4, South Africa scored 69 runs for the loss of 3 wickets to secure victory by 5 wickets. Aiden Markram, who scored 136 runs and took 2 wickets, was declared as the player of the match.

Match scorecard

Australia 1st innings

Australia batting
Player	Status	Runs	Balls	4s	6s	Strike rate
Usman Khawaja	c Bedingham b Rabada	0	20	0	0	0.00
Marnus Labuschagne	†c Verreynne b Jansen	17	56	1	0	30.35
Cameron Green	c Markram b Rabada	4	3	1	0	133.33
Steve Smith	c Jansen b Markram	66	112	10	0	58.92
Travis Head	†c Verreynne b Jansen	11	13	1	0	84.61
Beau Webster	c Bedingham b Rabada	72	92	11	0	78.26
Alex Carey	b Maharaj	23	31	4	0	74.19
Pat Cummins	b Rabada	1	6	0	0	16.66
Mitchell Starc	b Rabada	1	12	0	0	8.33
Nathan Lyon	b Jansen	0	4	0	0	0.00
Josh Hazlewood	not out	0	1	0	0	0.00
Extras	(lb 7, nb 10)	17				
Total	(10 wickets; 56.4 overs)	212		28	0	

Fall of wickets: : 1–12 (Khawaja, 6.3 ov), 2–16 (Green, 6.6 ov), 3–46 (Labuschagne, 17.6 ov), 4–67 (Head, 23.2 ov), 5-146 (Smith, 41.6 ov), 6-192 (Carey, 51.1 ov), 7-199 (Cummins, 52.4 ov), 8-210 (Webster, 54.4 ov), 9-211 (Lyon, 55.5 ov), 10-212 (Starc, 56.4 ov).

South Africa bowling
Bowler	Overs	Maidens	Runs	Wickets	Econ	Wides	NBs
Kagiso Rabada	15.4	5	51	5	3.25	0	1
Marco Jansen	15	5	49	3	3.50	0	2
Lungi Ngidi	8	0	45	0	5.62	0	2
Wiaan Mulder	11	3	36	0	3.27	0	5
Keshav Maharaj	6	0	19	1	3.16	0	0
Aiden Markram	2	0	5	1	2.50	0	0

South Africa 1st innings

South Africa batting
Player	Status	Runs	Balls	4s	6s	Strike rate
Aiden Markram	b Starc	0	6	0	0	0.00
Ryan Rickelton	c Khawaja b Starc	16	23	3	0	69.56
Wiaan Mulder	b Cummins	6	44	0	0	13.63
Temba Bavuma	c Labuschagne b Cummins	36	84	4	1	42.85
Tristan Stubbs	b Hazlewood	2	13	0	0	15.38
David Bedingham	†c Carey b Cummins	45	111	6	0	40.54
Kyle Verreynne	lbw b Cummins	13	39	0	0	33.33
Marco Jansen	c & b Cummins	0	3	0	0	0.00
Keshav Maharaj	run out (Head/†Carey)	7	15	1	0	46.66
Kagiso Rabada	c Webster b Cummins	1	6	0	0	16.66
Lungi Ngidi	not out	0	1	0	0	0.00
Extras	(lb 10, nb 2)	12				
Total	(10 wickets; 57.1 overs)	138		14	1	

Fall of wickets: 1–0 (Markram, 0.6 ov), 2–19 (Rickelton, 8.4 ov), 3–25 (Mulder, 15.2 ov), 4–30 (Stubbs, 20.2 ov), 5–94 (Bavuma, 39.2 ov), 6–126 (Verreynne, 51.3 ov), 7–126 (Jansen, 51.6 ov), 8–135 (Bedingham, 55.2 ov), 9–138 (Maharaj, 56.5 ov), 10–138 (Rabada, 57.1 ov)

Australia bowling
Bowler	Overs	Maidens	Runs	Wickets	Econ	Wides	NBs
Mitchell Starc	13	3	41	2	3.15	0	0
Josh Hazlewood	15	5	27	1	1.80	0	0
Pat Cummins	18.1	6	28	6	1.54	0	1
Nathan Lyon	8	3	12	0	1.50	0	0
Beau Webster	3	0	20	0	6.66	0	1

Australia 2nd innings

Australia batting
Player	Status	Runs	Balls	4s	6s	Strike rate
Marnus Labuschagne	†c Verreynne b Jansen	22	64	2	0	34.37
Usman Khawaja	†c Verreynne b Rabada	6	23	0	0	26.08
Cameron Green	c Mulder b Rabada	0	2	0	0	0.00
Steve Smith	lbw b Ngidi	13	25	1	0	52.00
Travis Head	b Mulder	9	18	1	0	50.00
Beau Webster	lbw b Ngidi	9	11	1	0	81.82
Alex Carey	lbw b Rabada	43	50	5	0	86.00
Pat Cummins	b Ngidi	6	5	1	0	120.00
Mitchell Starc	not out	58	136	5	0	42.64
Nathan Lyon	lbw b Rabada	2	13	0	0	15.38
Josh Hazlewood	c Maharaj b Markram	17	53	2	0	32.07
Extras	(b 6, lb 6, nb 10)	22				
Total	(10 wickets; 65 overs)	207		18	0	

Fall of wickets: 1–28 (Khawaja, 10.2 ov), 2–28 (Green, 10.4 ov), 3–44 (Labuschagne, 17.5 ov), 4–48 (Smith, 18.5 ov), 5–64 (Webster, 22.6 ov), 6–66 (Head, 23.4 ov), 7–73 (Cummins, 24.5 ov), 8–134 (Carey, 38.2 ov), 9–148 (Lyon, 42.4 ov), 10–207 (Hazlewood, 64.6 ov)

South Africa bowling
Bowler	Overs	Maidens	Runs	Wickets	Econ	Wides	NBs
Kagiso Rabada	18	1	59	4	3.27	0	5
Marco Jansen	18	3	58	1	3.22	0	3
Wiaan Mulder	8	1	18	1	2.25	0	2
Lungi Ngidi	13	1	38	3	2.92	0	0
Keshav Maharaj	6	1	17	0	2.83	0	0
Aiden Markram	2	1	5	1	2.50	0	0

South Africa 2nd innings

South Africa batting
Player	Status	Runs	Balls	4s	6s	Strike rate
Aiden Markram	c Head b Hazlewood	136	207	14	0	65.70
Ryan Rickelton	†c Carey b Starc	6	8	1	0	75.00
Wiaan Mulder	c Labuschagne b Starc	27	50	5	0	54.00
Temba Bavuma	†c Carey b Cummins	66	134	5	0	49.25
Tristan Stubbs	b Starc	8	43	0	0	18.60
David Bedingham	not out	21	49	1	0	42.85
Kyle Verreynne	not out	4	13	0	0	30.76
Marco Jansen						
Keshav Maharaj						
Kagiso Rabada						
Lungi Ngidi						
Extras	(b 8, lb 4, nb 2)	14				
Total	(5 wickets; 83.4 overs)	282		26	0	

Fall of wickets: 1–9 (Rickelton, 2.1 ov), 2–70 (Mulder, 17.4 ov), 3–217 (Bavuma, 58.6 ov), 4–241 (Stubbs, 70.3 ov), 5–276 (Markram, 80.6 ov)

Australia bowling
Bowler	Overs	Maidens	Runs	Wickets	Econ	Wides	NBs
Mitchell Starc	14.4	1	66	3	4.50	0	0
Josh Hazlewood	19	2	58	1	3.05	0	0
Pat Cummins	17	0	59	1	3.47	0	1
Nathan Lyon	26	4	66	0	2.53	0	0
Beau Webster	5	0	13	0	2.60	0	1
Travis Head	2	0	8	0	4.00	0	0

== Broadcasting ==
List of broadcasters
Country	Television broadcaster(s)	Radio	Digital streaming
Afghanistan	Ariana Television; Ariana News		Ariana Television; Ariana News
Australia	Amazon (company)	ABC Radio	Amazon Prime Video
Bangladesh	Nagorik TV; T Sports		Toffee
United Kingdom; Ireland	Sky Sports	BBC Radio 5 Sports Extra	
All Caribbean islands	ESPN Caribbean		ESPN Caribbean
USA and Canada	Willow TV		Willow TV
India	Star Sports		JioHotstar
New Zealand	Sky Sport	NZME Radio	Sky Go; Sky Sports Now
MENA	Etisalat and Starzplay		
Pakistan	PTV Sports		Tamasha
Sri Lanka	Maharaja TV; TV One		
Sub Saharan Africa	Supersport		Supersport, DSTV App
Pacific Islands	Digicel; TVWan Action		
Rest of the World		ICC.tv	ICC.tv

The ICC named the following panel of commentators for the final:

- Ian Bishop
- Stuart Broad
- Matthew Hayden
- Nasser Hussain
- Mel Jones
- Dinesh Karthik
- Kevin Pietersen
- Shaun Pollock
- Graeme Smith
- Ravi Shastri
- Ian Smith
