= South African cricket team in Bangladesh in 2024–25 =

International cricket tour

| | Bangladesh | South Africa |
- Dates: 21 October – 2 November 2024
| Captains | Najmul Hossain Shanto | Aiden Markram |

Test series
- Result: South Africa won the 2-match series 2–0
| Most runs | Mehidy Hasan Miraz (117) | Tony de Zorzi (248) |
| Most wickets | Taijul Islam (13) | Kagiso Rabada (14) |
- Player of the series: Kagiso Rabada (SA)

The South Africa cricket team toured Bangladesh in October and November 2024 to play two Test matches against the Bangladesh cricket team. The Test series formed part of the 2023–2025 ICC World Test Championship. In September 2024, Bangladesh Cricket Board (BCB) confirmed the fixtures for the tour.

== Background ==
On 23 September 2024, Cricket South Africa (CSA) said that they were satisfied with the security arrangements in Bangladesh. On 30 September 2024, CSA confirmed to travel to Bangladesh for the Test series.

== Squads ==
| Bangladesh | South Africa |
|---|---|
| Najmul Hossain Shanto (c); Khaled Ahmed (Note: In squad for second Test only.); Taskin Ahmed (Note: In squad for first Test only.); Jaker Ali (wk); Mahidul Islam Ankon (wk); ~~Shakib Al Hasan~~; Liton Das (wk); Zakir Hasan (wk); Nayeem Hasan; Mahmudul Hasan Joy; Mehidy Hasan Miraz; Mominul Haque; Shadman Islam; Taijul Islam; Hasan Mahmud; Hasan Murad; Mushfiqur Rahim (wk); Nahid Rana | Aiden Markram (c); ~~Temba Bavuma (c)~~; David Bedingham; Matthew Breetzke; ~~Nandre Burger~~; Dewald Brevis; Tony de Zorzi; Keshav Maharaj; Wiaan Mulder; Senuran Muthusamy; Lungi Ngidi; Dane Paterson; Dane Piedt; Kagiso Rabada; Ryan Rickelton (wk); Tristan Stubbs; Kyle Verreynne (wk) |

On 4 October, Nandre Burger was ruled out of the series following a lumbar stress reaction. On 11 October 2024, Temba Bavuma was ruled out of the first Test due to a muscle strain in his left triceps, and Aiden Markram named as captain for the first Test. Dewald Brevis and Lungi Ngidi were added to the squad. On 25 October 2024, Temba Bavuma was ruled out of the second Test due to injury.

On 17 October, Shakib Al Hasan ruled himself out for the first Test due to security reasons, with Hasan Murad named as his replacement. On 24 October, Bangladesh rested Taskin Ahmed for the second and Khaled Ahmed was added to the squad. On 28 October, Jaker Ali was ruled out of the second Test due to a concussion, and Mahidul Islam Ankon was named as his replacement.

== Test series ==
=== 1st Test ===
21–24 October 2024
Scorecard

| Bangladesh | v | South Africa |
| 106 (40.1 overs); Mahmudul Hasan Joy 30 (97); Wiaan Mulder 3/22 (8 overs) | | 308 (88.4 overs); Kyle Verreynne 114 (144); Taijul Islam 5/122 (36 overs) |
| 307 (89.5 overs); Mehidy Hasan Miraz 97 (191); Kagiso Rabada 6/46 (17.5 overs) | | 106/3 (22 overs); Tony de Zorzi 41 (52); Taijul Islam 3/43 (11 overs) |

South Africa won by 7 wickets
Sher-e-Bangla National Cricket Stadium, Dhaka
Umpires: Nitin Menon (Ind) and Joel Wilson (WI)
Player of the match: Kyle Verreynne (SA)

- Bangladesh won the toss and elected to bat.
- Jaker Ali (Ban) and Matthew Breetzke (SA) both made their Test debuts.
- Kagiso Rabada (SA) took his 300th wicket in Tests.
- Taijul Islam (Ban) took his 200th wicket in Tests.
- Mushfiqur Rahim became the first Bangladeshi cricketer to score 6,000 runs in Tests.
- World Test Championship points: South Africa 12, Bangladesh 0.

=== 2nd Test ===
29–31 October 2024
Scorecard

| South Africa | v | Bangladesh |
| 575/6d (144.2 overs); Tony de Zorzi 177 (269); Taijul Islam 5/198 (52.2 overs) | | 159 (45.2 overs); Mominul Haque 82 (112); Kagiso Rabada 5/37 (9 overs) |
| | | 143 (43.4 overs) (f/o); Hasan Mahmud 38* (30); Keshav Maharaj 5/59 (16.4 overs) |

South Africa won by an innings and 273 runs
Zohur Ahmed Chowdhury Stadium, Chittagong
Umpires: Langton Rusere (Zim) and Joel Wilson (WI)
Player of the match: Tony de Zorzi (SA)

- South Africa won the toss and elected to bat.
- Mahidul Islam Ankon (Ban) made his Test debut.
- Tony de Zorzi, Tristan Stubbs and Wiaan Mulder (SA) all scored their first centuries in Tests. This was only the second time three batsmen scored their maiden centuries in the same innings.
- Bangladesh's first innings total was the second-lowest in Test history (for completed innings) that included a century partnership.
- World Test Championship points: South Africa 12, Bangladesh 0.
