= Sri Lankan cricket team in South Africa in 2024–25 =

International cricket tour

	South Africa	Sri Lanka
- Dates: 27 November – 9 December 2024
Captains	Temba Bavuma	Dhananjaya de Silva

Test series
- Result: South Africa won the 2-match series 2–0
Most runs	Temba Bavuma (327)	Dinesh Chandimal (156)
Most wickets	Marco Jansen (14)	Prabath Jayasuriya (10)
- Player of the series: Temba Bavuma (SA)

The Sri Lanka cricket team toured South Africa in November and December 2024 to play two Test matches against the South Africa cricket team. The Test series formed part of the 2023–2025 ICC World Test Championship. In May 2024, the Cricket South Africa (CSA) confirmed the fixtures for the tour, as a part of the 2024–25 home international season. The series ran alongside the women's bilateral series between South Africa and England.

== Squads ==
South Africa	Sri Lanka
Temba Bavuma (c); David Bedingham; Matthew Breetzke; Gerald Coetzee; Tony de Zorzi; Marco Jansen; Keshav Maharaj; Kwena Maphaka; Aiden Markram; Wiaan Mulder; Senuran Muthusamy; Dane Paterson; Kagiso Rabada; Ryan Rickelton (wk); Tristan Stubbs (wk); Kyle Verreynne (wk)	Dhananjaya de Silva (c); Dinesh Chandimal (wk); Lasith Embuldeniya; Asitha Fernando; Oshada Fernando; Vishwa Fernando; Prabath Jayasuriya; Dimuth Karunaratne; Lahiru Kumara; Angelo Mathews; Kamindu Mendis; Kusal Mendis (wk); Pathum Nissanka; Nishan Peiris; Kasun Rajitha; Milan Rathnayake; Sadeera Samarawickrama (wk)

On 29 November, Wiaan Mulder was ruled out of the second Test due to fractured finger, with Matthew Breetzke named as his replacement. Gerald Coetzee was ruled out of the second Test on 1 December due to a groin injury, with Kwena Maphaka added to the squad as his replacement.

== Test series ==
=== 1st Test ===
27–30 November 2024
Scorecard

South Africa	v	Sri Lanka
191 (49.4 overs); Temba Bavuma 70 (117); Asitha Fernando 3/44 (14.4 overs)		42 (13.5 overs); Kamindu Mendis 13 (20); Marco Jansen 7/13 (6.5 overs)
366/5d (100.4 overs); Tristan Stubbs 122 (221); Vishwa Fernando 2/64 (18 overs)		282 (79.4 overs); Dinesh Chandimal 83 (174); Marco Jansen 4/73 (21.4 overs)

South Africa won by 233 runs
Kingsmead Cricket Ground, Durban
Umpires: Paul Reiffel (Aus) and Sharfuddoula Saikat (Ban)
Player of the match: Marco Jansen (SA)

- Sri Lanka won the toss and elected to field.
- Only 20.4 overs of play was possible on Day 1 due to rain.
- Sri Lanka recorded their lowest total in Tests.
- Prabath Jayasuriya (SL) took his 100th wicket in Tests.
- Marco Jansen (SA) took his maiden ten-wicket haul in Tests.
- World Test Championship points: South Africa 12, Sri Lanka 0.

=== 2nd Test ===
5–9 December 2024
Scorecard

South Africa	v	Sri Lanka
358 (103.4 overs); Kyle Verreynne 105* (133); Lahiru Kumara 4/79 (17.4 overs)		328 (99.2 overs); Pathum Nissanka 89 (157); Dane Paterson 5/71 (22 overs)
317 (86 overs); Temba Bavuma 66 (116); Prabath Jayasuriya 5/129 (34 overs)		238 (69.1 overs); Dhananjaya de Silva 50 (92); Keshav Maharaj 5/76 (25 overs)

South Africa won by 109 runs
St George's Park Cricket Ground, Gqeberha
Umpires: Paul Reiffel (Aus) and Joel Wilson (WI)
Player of the match: Dane Paterson (SA)

- South Africa won the toss and elected to bat.
- Lahiru Kumara (SL) took his 100th wicket in Tests.
- Ryan Rickelton (SA) scored his first century in Tests.
- Angelo Mathews (SL) scored his 8,000th run in Tests.
- Dane Paterson (SA) took his first five-wicket haul in Tests.
- Dinesh Chandimal (SL) scored his 6,000th run in Tests.
- Dhananjaya de Silva (SL) scored his 4,000th run in Tests.
- World Test Championship points: South Africa 12, Sri Lanka 0.
