= South African cricket team in India in 2022 =

International cricket tour

	India	South Africa
- Dates: 9 – 19 June 2022
Captains	Rishabh Pant	Temba Bavuma (Note: Keshav Maharaj captained South Africa for the fifth T20I.)

Twenty20 International series
- Results: 5-match series drawn 2–2
Most runs	Ishan Kishan (206)	Heinrich Klaasen (118)
Most wickets	Harshal Patel (7)	Dwaine Pretorius (5)
- Player of the series: Bhuvneshwar Kumar (Ind)

The South African cricket team toured India in June 2022 to play five Twenty20 International (T20I) matches. In September 2021, the Board of Control for Cricket in India (BCCI) confirmed the schedule for the tour. In March 2022, the tour itinerary was updated, with matches moved from Bengaluru and Nagpur to Cuttack and Visakhapatnam. In April 2022, the BCCI issued a further update to the tour, with New Delhi and Bengaluru hosting the first and fifth T20I matches respectively. After the COVID-19 pandemic, this was the first series in India to be played without restrictions.

Ahead of the first T20I match, India's captain KL Rahul was ruled out the series due to a right groin injury. Rishabh Pant was named as India's captain for the matches, with Hardik Pandya named as the team's vice-captain.

South Africa won the opening T20I match by seven wickets, denying India a chance to break the record of most consecutive team wins in the format. South Africa won the second T20I by four wickets to take a 2–0 lead in the series. India then won the third T20I by 48 runs, to give Rishabh Pant his first win as the captain of the Indian team. India won the fourth T20I by 82 runs to level the series with one match to play. However, the fifth and final T20I match was washed out after just 3.3 overs of play, with the series drawn 2–2.

== Squads ==
T20Is
India	South Africa
~~KL Rahul (c)~~; Rishabh Pant (c, wk); Hardik Pandya (vc); Ravi Bishnoi; Yuzvendra Chahal; Ruturaj Gaikwad; Deepak Hooda; Shreyas Iyer; Venkatesh Iyer; Dinesh Karthik (wk); Avesh Khan; Ishan Kishan; Bhuvneshwar Kumar; Umran Malik; Axar Patel; Harshal Patel; Arshdeep Singh; ~~Kuldeep Yadav~~	Temba Bavuma (c); Quinton de Kock (wk); Reeza Hendricks; Marco Jansen; Heinrich Klaasen; Keshav Maharaj; ~~Aiden Markram~~; David Miller; Lungi Ngidi; Anrich Nortje; Wayne Parnell; Dwaine Pretorius; Kagiso Rabada; Tabraiz Shamsi; Tristan Stubbs; Rassie van der Dussen

KL Rahul and Kuldeep Yadav were ruled out of India's squad due to a groin and hand injury respectively. Ahead of the first T20I, South Africa's Aiden Markram tested positive for COVID-19, and was later ruled out of the entire series.

== T20I series ==
=== 1st T20I ===
9 June 2022
19:30 (N)
Scorecard

India; 211/4 (20 overs)	v	South Africa; 212/3 (19.1 overs)
Ishan Kishan 76 (48); Wayne Parnell 1/32 (4 overs)		Rassie van der Dussen 75* (46); Axar Patel 1/40 (4 overs)

South Africa won by 7 wickets
Arun Jaitley Cricket Stadium, New Delhi
Umpires: Jayaraman Madanagopal (Ind) and Nitin Menon (Ind)
Player of the match: David Miller (SA)

- South Africa won the toss and elected to field.
- Tristan Stubbs (SA) made his T20I debut.
- Rishabh Pant captained India for the first time in T20Is.
- This was South Africa's highest successful run chase in T20Is.

=== 2nd T20I ===
12 June 2022
19:30 (N)
Scorecard

India; 148/6 (20 overs)	v	South Africa; 149/6 (18.2 overs)
Shreyas Iyer 40 (35); Anrich Nortje 2/36 (4 overs)		Heinrich Klaasen 81 (46); Bhuvneshwar Kumar 4/13 (4 overs)

South Africa won by 4 wickets
Barabati Stadium, Cuttack
Umpires: K. N. Ananthapadmanabhan (Ind) and Anil Chaudhary (Ind)
Player of the match: Heinrich Klaasen (SA)

- South Africa won the toss and elected to field.

=== 3rd T20I ===
14 June 2022
19:30 (N)
Scorecard

India; 179/5 (20 overs)	v	South Africa; 131 (19.1 overs)
Ruturaj Gaikwad 57 (35); Dwaine Pretorius 2/29 (4 overs)		Heinrich Klaasen 29 (24); Harshal Patel 4/25 (3.1 overs)

India won by 48 runs
ACA–VDCA Cricket Stadium, Vishakhapatnam
Umpires: Nitin Menon (Ind) and Virender Sharma (Ind)
Player of the match: Yuzvendra Chahal (Ind)

- South Africa won the toss and elected to field.

=== 4th T20I ===
17 June 2022
19:30 (N)
Scorecard

India; 169/6 (20 overs)	v	South Africa; 87 (16.5 overs)
Dinesh Karthik 55 (27); Lungi Ngidi 2/20 (3 overs)		Rassie van der Dussen 20 (20); Avesh Khan 4/18 (4 overs)

India won by 82 runs
Saurashtra Cricket Association Stadium, Rajkot
Umpires: Jayaraman Madanagopal (Ind) and Nitin Menon (Ind)
Player of the match: Dinesh Karthik (Ind)

- South Africa won the toss and elected to field.
- Marco Jansen (SA) made his T20I debut.
- This was South Africa's lowest total in T20Is.

=== 5th T20I ===
19 June 2022
19:30 (N)
Scorecard

India; 28/2 (3.3 overs)	v	South Africa
Ishan Kishan 15 (7); Lungi Ngidi 2/6 (1.3 overs)

No result
M. Chinnaswamy Stadium, Bengaluru
Umpires: K. N. Ananthapadmanabhan (Ind) and Anil Chaudhary (Ind)

- South Africa won the toss and elected to field.
- No further play was possible due to rain.
- David Miller (SA) played in his 100th T20I.
