= Dane Paterson =

South African cricketer (born 1989)

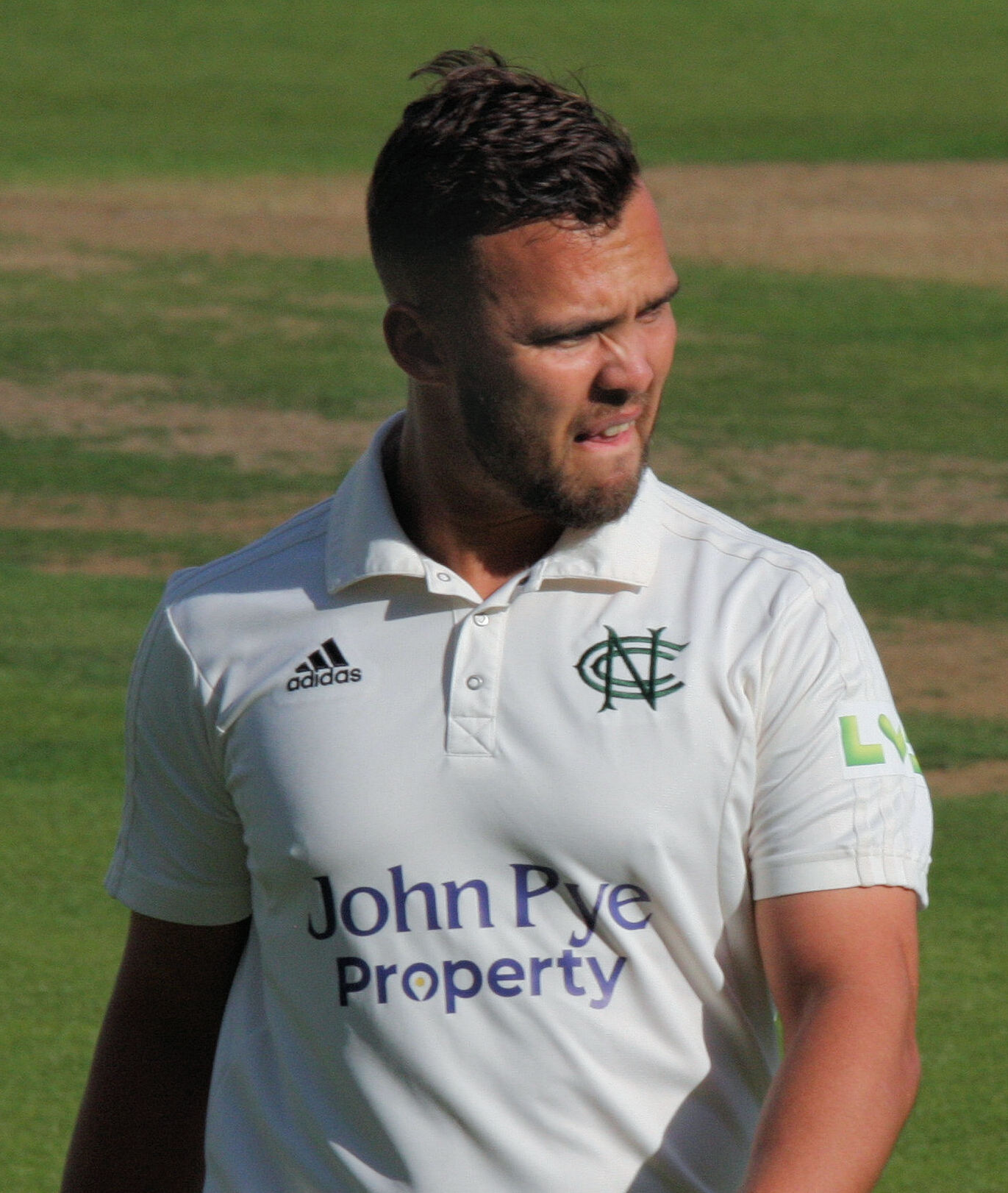
- Paterson for Nottinghamshire CCC in 2021

Personal information
- Full name: Dane Paterson
- Born: 4 April 1989 (age 37); Cape Town, Cape Province, South Africa
- Batting: Right-handed
- Bowling: Right-arm fast-medium
- Role: Bowler

International information
- National side: South Africa (2017–present)
- Test debut (cap 344): 16 January 2020 v England
- Last Test: 26 December 2024 v Pakistan
- ODI debut (cap 121): 15 October 2017 v Bangladesh
- Last ODI: 22 January 2019 v Pakistan
- T20I debut (cap 70): 25 January 2017 v Sri Lanka
- Last T20I: 12 October 2018 v Zimbabwe

Domestic team information
- Years: Team
- 2008/09–present: Western Province
- 2010/11–2012/13: Dolphins
- 2011/12–2012/13: KwaZulu-Natal
- 2013/14–2019/20: Cape Cobras
- 2016/17–2017/18: South Western Districts
- 2018: Paarl Rocks
- 2019: Jozi Stars
- 2021–2024: Nottinghamshire
- 2021/22: Eastern Province
- 2025: Middlesex

Career statistics
Competition	Test	ODI	T20I	FC
Matches	8	4	8	186
Runs scored	130	–	5	1,895
Batting average	14.44	–	5.00	11.84
100s/50s	0/0	–	0/0	0/1
Top score	39*	–	4*	59
Balls bowled	1,519	209	179	31,539
Wickets	29	4	9	672
Bowling average	26.41	54.25	29.44	23.96
5 wickets in innings	2	0	0	24
10 wickets in match	0	0	0	2
Best bowling	5/61	3/44	4/32	8/52
Catches/stumpings	2/–	2/–	1/–	53/–
Medal record
Men's cricket
Representing South Africa
World Test Championship
Winner	2023–2025
- Source: ESPNcricinfo, 19 November 2026

Dane Paterson (born 4 April 1989) is a South African cricketer. He made his international debut for the South Africa cricket team in 2017. He plays for Western Province in domestic matches.

== Domestic career ==
He was included in the Western Province cricket team squad for the 2015 Africa T20 Cup. In August 2017, he was named in Bloem City Blazers' squad for the first season of the T20 Global League. However, in October 2017, Cricket South Africa initially postponed the tournament until November 2018, with it being cancelled soon after.

In June 2018, he was named in the squad for the Cape Cobras team for the 2018–19 season. In September 2018, he was named in Western Province's squad for the 2018 Africa T20 Cup. He was the leading wicket-taker for Western Province in the tournament, with seven dismissals in four matches.

In October 2018, he was named in Paarl Rocks' squad for the first edition of the Mzansi Super League T20 tournament. He was the joint-leading wicket-taker for the team in the tournament, with ten dismissals in eleven matches.

In September 2019, he was named in Western Province's squad for the 2019–20 CSA Provincial T20 Cup. In April 2021, he was named in Eastern Province's squad, ahead of the 2021–22 cricket season in South Africa.

Paterson joined Nottinghamshire in March 2021, taking 51 wickets in his first season with the club before topping that with 56 dismissals in the 2022 County Championship season as the team won Division Two. That included career-best figures of 8/52 against Worcestershire in April 2022. He signed a new two-year contract at Nottinghamshire in October 2022 and in April 2023 claimed his 500th First Class wicket as the club defeated Somerset.

In February 2025, Paterson signed a contract to play for Middlesex in the first half of that year's county championship season.

== International career ==
In January 2017, he was included in South Africa's Twenty20 International (T20I) squad for their series against Sri Lanka, and made his T20I debut on 25 January 2017. The following month, he was included in South Africa's One Day International (ODI) squad for their series against New Zealand. In October 2017, he was named as Morné Morkel replacement for the second Test against Bangladesh. The same month, he was named in South Africa's One Day International (ODI) squad for the series against Bangladesh. He made his ODI debut for South Africa against Bangladesh on 15 October 2017.

In December 2018, he was added to South Africa's Test squad for the series against Pakistan, but he did not play. In December 2019, he was named in South Africa's Test squad for their series against England. He made his Test debut for South Africa, against England, on 16 January 2020.

Four years after his first two Test appearances against England, Paterson was recalled to the South Africa squad for their two-match series with New Zealand in February 2024. He took five wickets across the two games and retained his place in the 16-man squad named for the tour of the West Indies in August 2024. In October 2024, he was named in South Africa's Test squad for their away series against Bangladesh. In November 2024, he was named in South Africa's Test squad for their home series against Sri Lanka. On 7 December 2024, during Sri Lanka's first innings of the second and final Test match of the series, he picked up his maiden five-wicket haul in only his sixth test appearance at the age of 35. Later that month, Paterson took his second Test match five-wicket haul on the opening day of the first in a two-match home series against Pakistan, finishing with 5/61 as the visitors were bowled out for 211.

== International five-wicket hauls ==
Test five-wicket hauls by Dane Paterson
No.	Bowling Figures	Overs	Innings	Against	Venue	Country	Date	Result
1	5/71	22	2	Sri Lanka	St George's Park, Gqeberha	South Africa	5 December 2024	South Africa won by 109 runs
2	5/61	16	1	Pakistan	Centurion Park, Centurion	South Africa	26 December 2024	South Africa won by 2 wickets
