= Pakistani cricket team in Sri Lanka in 2023 =

International cricket tour

	Sri Lanka	Pakistan
- Dates: 16 – 28 July 2023
Captains	Dimuth Karunaratne	Babar Azam

Test series
- Result: Pakistan won the 2-match series 2–0
Most runs	Dhananjaya de Silva (271)	Saud Shakeel (295)
Most wickets	Prabath Jayasuriya (9)	Nauman Ali (10); Abrar Ahmed (10)
- Player of the series: Salman Ali Agha (Pak)

The Pakistan men's cricket team toured Sri Lanka in July 2023 to play two Test matches. The series formed part of the 2023–2025 ICC World Test Championship. In August 2022, the International Cricket Council in a press release confirmed the bilateral series. On 20 June 2023, Sri Lanka Cricket (SLC) announced the schedule of the tour.

== Squads ==
Sri Lanka	Pakistan
Dimuth Karunaratne (c); Dhananjaya de Silva (vc); Dinesh Chandimal (wk); Asitha Fernando; Vishwa Fernando; Prabath Jayasuriya; Praveen Jayawickrama; Lakshitha Manasinghe; Angelo Mathews; Dilshan Madushanka; Nishan Madushka; Kamindu Mendis; Kusal Mendis (wk); Ramesh Mendis; Pathum Nissanka; Kasun Rajitha; Sadeera Samarawickrama (wk)	Babar Azam (c); Mohammad Rizwan (vc, wk); Shaheen Afridi; Aamer Jamal; Abrar Ahmed; Sarfaraz Ahmed (wk); Hasan Ali; Nauman Ali; Imam-ul-Haq; Mohammad Huraira; Shan Masood; Mohammad Nawaz; Salman Ali Agha; Abdullah Shafique; Naseem Shah; Saud Shakeel

Asitha Fernando was added to Sri Lanka's squad before the start of the second Test.

== Tour match ==
11–12 July 2023
Scorecard

Sri Lanka Cricket President's XI	v	Pakistan
196 (46.3 overs); Oshada Fernando 113 (127); Hasan Ali 3/22 (7.3 overs)		342 (78.3 overs); Shan Masood 83 (69); Lakshitha Manasinghe 4/82 (18.3 overs)
88/4 (30 overs); Nuwanidu Fernando 31* (42); Salman Ali Agha 2/18 (6.5 overs)

Match drawn
Mahinda Rajapaksa International Cricket Stadium, Hambantota
Umpires: Sanjeewa Fernando (SL) and Ranmore Martinesz (SL)

- Sri Lanka Cricket President's XI won the toss and elected to bat.

== Test series ==
=== 1st Test ===
16–20 July 2023
Scorecard

Sri Lanka	v	Pakistan
312 (95.2 overs); Dhananjaya de Silva 122 (214); Abrar Ahmad 3/68 (31.2 overs)		461 (121.2 overs); Saud Shakeel 208* (361); Ramesh Mendis 5/136 (42.2 overs)
279 (83.1 overs); Dhananjaya de Silva 82 (118); Abrar Ahmed 3/68 (24.1 overs)		133/6 (32.5 overs); Imam-ul-Haq 50* (84); Prabath Jayasuriya 4/56 (14.5 overs)

Pakistan won by 4 wickets
Galle International Stadium, Galle
Umpires: Rod Tucker (Aus) and Alex Wharf (Eng)
Player of the match: Saud Shakeel (Pak)

- Sri Lanka won the toss and elected to bat.
- 24.2 overs, 13 overs and 7.2 overs of play was lost on Day 1, Day 2 and Day 3 respectively due to rain.
- Shaheen Afridi (Pak) took his 100th wicket in Tests.
- Abdullah Shafique (Pak) scored his 1000th run in Tests.
- Saud Shakeel become the first Pakistani to score double hundred in Sri Lanka.
- World Test Championship points: Pakistan 12, Sri Lanka 0.

=== 2nd Test ===
24–27 July 2023
Scorecard

Sri Lanka	v	Pakistan
166 (48.4 overs); Dhananjaya de Silva 57 (68); Abrar Ahmed 4/69 (20.4 overs)		576/5d (134 overs); Abdullah Shafique 201 (326); Asitha Fernando 3/133 (25 overs)
188 (67.4 overs); Angelo Mathews 63 * (127); Nauman Ali 7/70 (23 overs)

Pakistan won by an innings and 222 runs
Singhalese Sports Club Cricket Ground, Colombo
Umpires: Chris Gaffaney (NZ) (Note: Raveendra Wimalasiri (SL) replaced Chris Gaffaney as the on-field umpire on the second day.) and Alex Wharf (Eng)
Player of the match: Abdullah Shafique (Pak)

- Sri Lanka won the toss and elected to bat.
- 10.3 overs and 80 overs of play was lost on Day 1 and Day 2 respectively due to rain.
- Dilshan Madushanka (SL) made his Test debut.
- Mohammad Rizwan (Pak) replaced Sarfaraz Ahmed as a concussion substitute in the second innings of the match.
- World Test Championship points: Pakistan 12, Sri Lanka 0.
