= Marco Jansen =

South African cricketer (born 2000)

- Jansen playing for South Africa in 2026

Personal information
- Full name: Marco Jansen
- Born: 1 May 2000 (age 26); Klerksdorp, North West, South Africa
- Height: 6 ft 8 in (203 cm)
- Batting: Right-handed
- Bowling: Left-arm fast
- Role: Bowling all-rounder
- Relatives: Duan Jansen (twin brother)

International information
- National side: South Africa (2021–present)
- Test debut (cap 349): 26 December 2021 v India
- Last Test: 9 October 2026 v Australia
- ODI debut (cap 144): 19 January 2022 v India
- Last ODI: 6 December 2025 v India
- ODI shirt no.: 70
- T20I debut (cap 96): 17 June 2022 v India
- Last T20I: 4 March 2026 v New Zealand
- T20I shirt no.: 70

Domestic team information
- Years: Team
- 2018: North West
- 2019–2020: Knights
- 2020–2021: Warriors
- 2021: Mumbai Indians
- 2022–2024: Sunrisers Hyderabad
- 2022–present: Sunrisers Eastern Cape
- 2024: Washington Freedom
- 2025–present: Punjab Kings
- 2026: Welsh Fire

Career statistics
Competition	Test	ODI	T20I	FC
Matches	25	34	30	47
Runs scored	830	647	268	1,633
Batting average	25.15	26.95	17.86	24.74
100s/50s	0/6	0/3	0/2	0/12
Top score	93	75*	55*	93
Balls bowled	4,202	1,649	659	7,738
Wickets	104	52	33	185
Bowling average	21.63	33.78	29.75	22.11
5 wickets in innings	5	1	0	7
10 wickets in match	1	0	0	1
Best bowling	7/13	5/39	4/22	7/13
Catches/stumpings	29/–	16/–	16/–	40/–
Medal record
Men's cricket
Representing South Africa
ICC World Test Championship
Winner	2023–2025
ICC T20 World Cup
Runner-up	2024 West Indies & USA
- Source: ESPNcricinfo, 19 November 2026

Marco Jansen (born 1 May 2000) is a South African professional cricketer who bowls left-arm fast and bats right-handed. He plays internationally for South Africa and domestically for the Titans, while also representing Sunrisers Eastern Cape in the SA20, for Washington Freedom in the MLC and the Punjab Kings in the Indian Premier League (IPL). Jansen made his national team debut in 2021 and was part of the squad that won the 2023–2025 ICC World Test Championship.

== Early life ==
During his early years, Jansen used to open the batting. At the age of nine, in a 20-over match, he scored 164 not out. His father watched the match and identified his son's talent. He trained Jansen in the nets along with his twin brother Duan. Duan also plays cricket for North West.

== Domestic and T20 franchise career ==
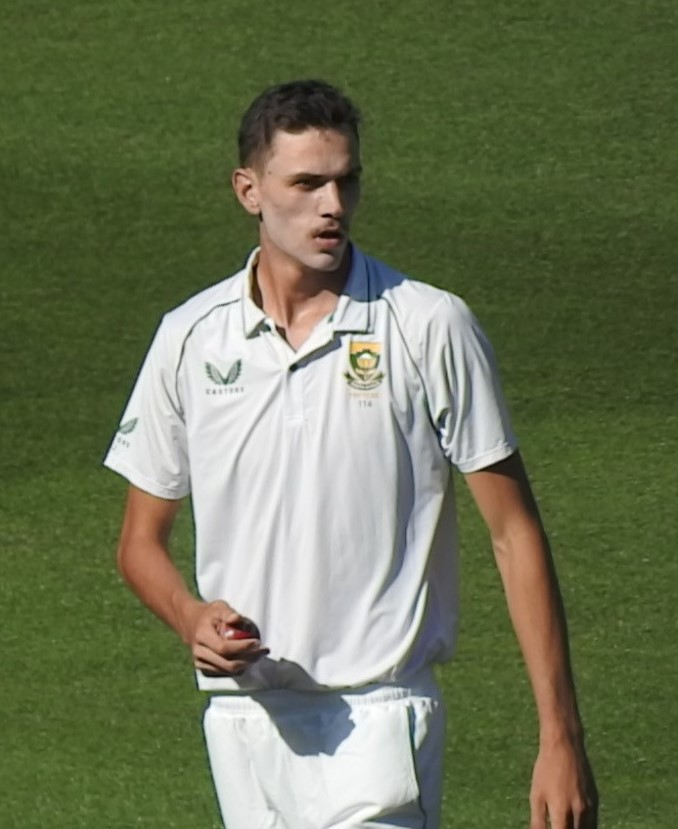
Jansen in 2022

Jansen made his List A debut for North West in the 2017–18 CSA Provincial One-Day Challenge on 8 April 2018. He made his first-class debut for North West in the 2018–19 CSA 3-Day Provincial Cup on 11 October 2018.

In January 2019, Jansen was named in the South Africa national under-19 cricket team's squad, ahead of their tour to India. He was the leading wicket-taker for North West in the 2018–19 CSA 3-Day Provincial Cup, with 27 dismissals in six matches.

Jansen made his Twenty20 debut for Knights in the 2018–19 CSA T20 Challenge on 28 April 2019. He was the leading wicket-taker for North West in the 2018–19 CSA 3-Day Provincial Cup, with 27 dismissals in six matches.

In September 2019, Jansen was named in the squad for the Durban Heat team for the 2019 Mzansi Super League tournament.

In February 2021, Jansen was bought by the Mumbai Indians in the IPL auction ahead of the 2021 Indian Premier League. Jansen made his IPL debut for Mumbai Indians against Royal Challengers Bangalore on 9 April 2021. He took 2 wickets for 28 runs in his 4 overs, which included the wicket of Glenn Maxwell, his debut IPL wicket. Later the same month, he was named in Eastern Province's squad, ahead of the 2021–22 cricket season in South Africa.

In February 2022, Jansen was bought by the Sunrisers Hyderabad in the auction for the 2022 Indian Premier League tournament.

In May 2023, Jansen was selected by Washington Freedom to play in the inaugural 2023 Major League Cricket competition.

In the IPL auction for the 2025 IPL season, Jansen was bought by the Punjab Kings for 7 Crore

== International career ==
Jansen batting for South Africa

In January 2021, Jansen was added to South Africa's Test squad for their series against Pakistan.

In May 2021, Jansen was named in South Africa's Test squad for their series against the West Indies. In December 2021, Jansen received another call-up to South Africa's Test squad, this time for their home series against India. He made his Test debut on 26 December 2021, against India. His maiden test wicket was Jasprit Bumrah, caught at third slip by Wiaan Mulder.

In January 2022, Jansen got his maiden One Day International (ODI) call-up, for South Africa's home series against India. He made his ODI debut on 19 January 2022, for South Africa against India. In May 2022, Jansen was named in South Africa's Twenty20 International (T20I) squad for their away series against India. He made his T20I debut on 17 June 2022, for South Africa against India. He also played in the 2023 Cricket World Cup in India.

In May 2024, he was named in South Africa's squad for the 2024 ICC Men's T20 World Cup tournament, where South Africa finished runners up.

In November 2024, he was named in South Africa's squad for the Twenty20 International series against India. In the third match, he scored 54 off 17 deliveries, setting a record for the fastest T20I half-century against India and the second fastest by a South African, achieving his 50 in 16 deliveries, only behind Quinton de Kock, who did it in 15.

In November 2024, he was named in South Africa's squad for the Test Series against Sri Lanka. On the second day of the 1st Test Series, he bowled his best figure of 7/13, toppling Sri Lanka to a score of 42, their lowest score in Test cricket. This feat made him the first ever South African to take a 10-fer at Kingsmead, Durban. He is also the first left-arm South African seamer to gain the feat.

In November 2025, during the second and final Test of South African tour of India, which the visitors won in a 2–0 (2) clean sweep, Jansen was named Player of the Match for his all-round performance (93 runs, 6/48 and 1/23). It was India's biggest Test defeat, as they lost by 408 runs. His efforts were central to South Africa securing their first Test series victory in India in 25 years.

== International five-wicket hauls ==
Test five-wicket hauls by Marco Jansen
No.	Bowling Figures	Overs	Innings	Against	Venue	Country	Date	Result
1	5/35	12.2	2	England	The Oval, London	England	8 September 2022	England won by 9 wickets
2	7/13	6.5	2	Sri Lanka	Kingsmead Cricket Ground, Durban	South Africa	27 November 2024	South Africa won by 233 runs
3	6/52	14	3	Pakistan	Centurion Park, Centurion	South Africa	26 December 2024	South Africa won by 2 wickets
4	6/48	19.5	2	India	Assam Cricket Association Stadium, Guwahati	India	22 November 2025	South Africa won by 408 runs
5	5/33	11	2	Australia	St George's Park, Gqeberha	South Africa	18 October 2026	South Africa won by an innings and 31 runs

ODI five-wicket hauls by Marco Jansen
No.	Bowling Figures	Overs	Innings	Against	Venue	Country	Date	Result
1	5/39	8 overs	2	Australia	Wanderers Stadium, Johannesburg	South Africa	17 September 2023	South Africa won by 122 runs
