= Aiden Markram =

South African cricketer (born 1994)

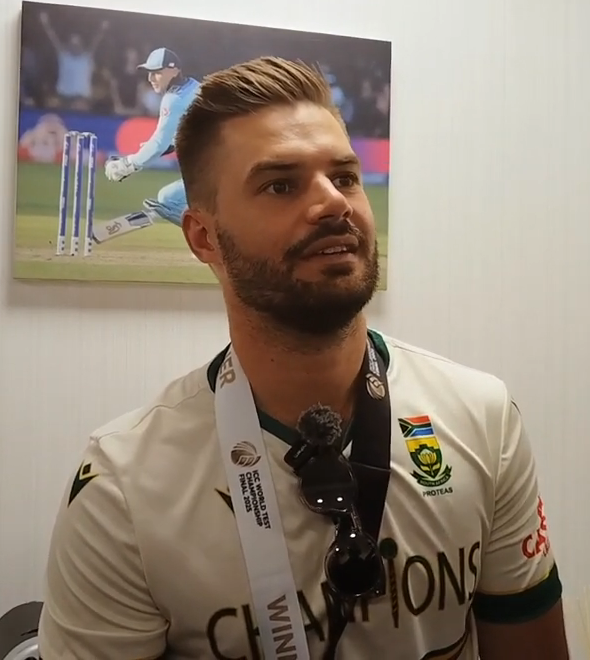
- Markram in 2025

Personal information
- Full name: Aiden Kyle Markram
- Born: 4 October 1994 (age 32); Centurion, Gauteng, South Africa
- Height: 6 ft 1 in (185 cm)
- Batting: Right-handed
- Bowling: Right-arm off break
- Role: Top-order batter

International information
- National side: South Africa (2017–present)
- Test debut (cap 332): 28 September 2017 v Bangladesh
- Last Test: 14 November 2025 v India
- ODI debut (cap 122): 22 October 2017 v Bangladesh
- Last ODI: 6 December 2025 v India
- ODI shirt no.: 4
- T20I debut (cap 81): 22 March 2019 v Sri Lanka
- Last T20I: 4 March 2026 v New Zealand
- T20I shirt no.: 4

Domestic team information
- Years: Team
- 2014–present: Northerns
- 2016–present: Titans
- 2018: Durham
- 2018: Paarl Rocks
- 2019: Hampshire
- 2021: Punjab Kings
- 2022–2024: Sunrisers Hyderabad
- 2023–2025: Sunrisers Eastern Cape
- 2025–2026: Lucknow Super Giants
- 2026: Durban's Super Giants
- 2026: Manchester Super Giants

Career statistics
| Competition | Test | ODI | T20I | FC |
|---|---|---|---|---|
| Matches | 54 | 88 | 77 | 107 |
| Runs scored | 3,406 | 2,723 | 1,966 | 7,406 |
| Batting average | 35.47 | 36.30 | 31.70 | 41.84 |
| 100s/50s | 8/15 | 4/14 | 0/14 | 20/33 |
| Top score | 152 | 175 | 86* | 204* |
| Balls bowled | 759 | 1,360 | 408 | 1,367 |
| Wickets | 6 | 21 | 16 | 10 |
| Bowling average | 61.16 | 63.04 | 37.68 | 63.50 |
| 5 wickets in innings | 0 | 0 | 0 | 0 |
| 10 wickets in match | 0 | 0 | 0 | 0 |
| Best bowling | 2/27 | 2/18 | 3/21 | 2/27 |
| Catches/stumpings | 78/– | 45/– | 47/– | 133/– |
Medal record
Men's cricket
Representing South Africa
World Test Championship
| Winner | 2023–2025 |
T20 World Cup
| Runner-up | 2024 West Indies & USA |
U19 World Cup
| Winner | 2014 UAE |
- Source: ESPNcricinfo, 19 November 2026

Aiden Kyle Markram (born 4 October 1994) is a South African cricketer who is the current captain of the South Africa national cricket team in Twenty20 International cricket and vice-captain in One Day International and Test cricket. Markram attended Cornwall Hill College briefly before attending Pretoria Boys High School to take advantage of its superior sporting history and facilities. Markram had captained the South African under-19 cricket team to win the 2014 ICC Under-19 Cricket World Cup. In the 2018 South African Cricket Annual, he was named as one of the five “Cricketers of the Year”. Markram was described by former captain and batsman Graeme Smith as a future South Africa captain. He made his international debut for South Africa in September 2017. He was the captain of Sunrisers Eastern Cape of the SA20 league which was formed in 2022, from its inception till his release ahead of the 2025 Auction, winning 2 consecutive titles in 2022 and 2023. Markram was a member of the South African team which won the 2025 ICC World Test Championship final, the second ICC title the country has won till date, and was the Player of the Match, after scoring 136 (207) in the second innings.

== Domestic and franchise career ==
Markram made his first class debut for Northerns cricket team against South Western Districts on 9 October 2014. He was included in the Northerns cricket team squad for the 2015 Africa T20 Cup. In 2016, Markram was club professional for Walkden in the Bolton Cricket League.

In May 2017, Markram was named Domestic Newcomer of the Year at Cricket South Africa's annual awards. In August 2017, he was named in Nelson Mandela Bay Stars' squad for the first season of the T20 Global League. However, in October 2017, Cricket South Africa initially postponed the tournament until November 2018, with it being canceled soon after.

In October 2018, Markram was named in Paarl Rocks' squad for the first edition of the Mzansi Super League T20 tournament.

In March 2019, Markram signed for Hampshire County Cricket Club as their overseas player for the first part of the season. Later the same month, Markram scored 127 runs in the final of the 2018–19 Momentum One Day Cup, to help Titans win the tournament.

In September 2019, Markram was named in the squad for the Paarl Rocks team for the 2019 Mzansi Super League tournament. In April 2021, he was named in Northerns' squad, ahead of the 2021–22 cricket season in South Africa.

On 11 September 2021, Markram was included in the Punjab Kings squad for the second phase of the 2021 Indian Premier League (IPL) in the UAE. In February 2022, he was bought by the Sunrisers Hyderabad in the auction for the 2022 Indian Premier League tournament.

After successfully leading Sunrisers Eastern Cape to the first SA20 championship, Markram was appointed as the captain of Sunrisers Hyderabad for the 2023 season of the Indian Premier League.

He decided against being retained by the Sunrisers Eastern Cape for the 2026 SA20 and was bought by Durban's Super Giants in the auction for R14 million. On 13 September, 2025, he was named captain of the Durban's Super Giants for the 2026 SA20 season.

== International career ==
Markram batting for South Africa in 2026

=== Early years ===
In June 2017, Markram was named in South Africa's Test squad for their series against England, but did not play. In August 2017, he was named as captain of the South Africa A cricket team for their two four-day matches against India A.

In September 2017, Markram was named in South Africa's Test squad for their series against Bangladesh. He made his Test debut for South Africa against Bangladesh on 28 September 2017.

After narrowly missing out on a maiden Test century on debut, Markram completed the feat in the second Test against Bangladesh on 6 October 2017 scoring 143 off 186 balls before being bowled by Rubel Hossain.

In October 2017, Markram was added to South Africa's One Day International (ODI) squad ahead of the third match against Bangladesh, replacing Hashim Amla. He made his ODI debut for South Africa against Bangladesh on 22 October 2017, scoring 66 runs as well as taking 2 wickets.

In December 2017, Markram scored his second Test hundred and became the first South Africa player to score two centuries in his first three Tests.

=== ODI captaincy ===
In February 2018, South Africa's captain Faf du Plessis was ruled out of the last five ODIs and the Twenty20 International (T20I) series against India due to a finger injury. Markram was named as South Africa's captain for the remaining ODI fixtures in du Plessis' absence. He, at the age of 23 years 123 days, is the second youngest player to captain South Africa in ODIs after Graeme Smith.

=== 2018–2019 ===
On 30 March 2018, Markram scored his career-best score of 152 runs on the first day of the fourth test against Australia.

In June 2018, Markram was named in South Africa's Test squad for a two-Test series in Sri Lanka. Markram averaged just 10 with the bat in this series, his first overseas for South Africa, which showed a vulnerability against spin bowling.

In August 2018, Markram was named in South Africa's Twenty20 International (T20I) squad for the one-off match against Sri Lanka, but he did not play in the fixture. In March 2019, he was again named in South Africa's T20I squad, this time for the series against Sri Lanka. He made his T20I debut for South Africa against Sri Lanka on 22 March 2019.

In April 2019, Markram was named in South Africa's squad for the 2019 Cricket World Cup.

In August 2019, Markram was named in South Africa's squad for the three Test series in India. Markram struggled in the first two matches of this series, bagging a pair in the second Test, before being ruled out of the third due to a self-inflicted wrist injury. This series raised further questions about Markram's overseas performances, averaging just 10.50 in four away Tests, all in the subcontinent.

In December 2019, Markram was named in South Africa's squad for the four-Test home series against England. In the first Test, he scored 20 runs in the first innings and 2 in the second as South Africa beat England by 107 runs at Centurion. Markram however missed the remainder of the series after fracturing his finger.

=== 2021–2023 ===
In January 2021, Markram was named in South Africa's Test squad for their series against Pakistan. In the first test, Markram scored a patient 74 in a losing effort. In the second test, Markram made his first century in more than two and a half years, and his first in Asia. Markram finished as the leading run scorer in the series, averaging 56.75, however South Africa lost the series, their first Test series defeat against Pakistan since 2003.

In March 2023, he was appointed as the captain of South Africa cricket team in T20Is, ahead of their home series against the West Indies.

==== 2023 Cricket World Cup ====
In October 2023 in a match against Sri Lanka, Markram scored the then fastest century in a men's Cricket World Cup, reaching the milestone in 49 deliveries, a record later broken during the tournament by Australian batter Glenn Maxwell. He was dismissed soon after for 106 off 54.

=== 2024–2025 ===
==== 2024 T20 World Cup ====
In May 2024, he was named the captain in South Africa's squad for the 2024 ICC Men's T20 World Cup tournament. He had a quiet tournament with the bat, but became the first ever Proteas captain to lead the team to the final of an ICC Men's T20 World Cup. South Africa went on to lose the final to India.

==== 2025 World Test Championship Final ====
He was named as the Player of the Final in the 2025 ICC World Test Championship final as South Africa defeated Australia by 5 wickets to win their maiden championship.

=== 2025–2026 ===
In August 2025, he was named in the South Africa white ball squads to tour Australia.

In September 2025, he was named in the Proteas white ball squads to tour England.

In September 2025, he was named captain of the Proteas squad to tour Pakistan, in absence of regular skipper Temba Bavuma.

In November 2025, he was named in the Proteas Test squad to tour India. In the second and last match, which South Africa won to complete a 2-0 clean sweep, he broke the record for the most catches in a Test match, with 9, surpassing Rahane's 8 in 2015. In December 2025, Markram produced a pivotal innings for South Africa in the second ODI against India, keeping the series alive for his team at 1-1 (3). Having previously expressed responsibility for South Africa's shortcomings in the earlier match, Markram responded with a commanding century that restored confidence in the team and provided a solid platform for the team's middle order. His innings was credited with shifting momentum in South Africa's favour, with the match report noting a surge in belief within the squad as Markram set the stage for the team's more aggressive batters. Markram was declared Player of the Match. This chase also marked the third time South Africa has successfully chased 350 + runs in ODIs, matching India for the most such chases for any team.

=== 2026–present ===
==== 2026 T20 World Cup ====
In January 2026, he was named captain of the South Africa squad to take part in the 2026 edition of the Men's T20 World Cup in India and Sri Lanka. In the first match against Canada, he led his team to victory with 59 runs off 32 balls. In the third game, he led South Africa's chase with an unbeaten 86 off 44 balls, striking eight fours and four sixes, as his innings powered a seven-wicket win over New Zealand in the 2026 ICC Men's T20 World Cup. In the Super 8 stage of the tournament, he scored 82 not out off 46 balls as his team chased down 177 against the West Indies, securing semi final qualification.

== International centuries ==
Test centuries by Aiden Markram
| No. | Runs | Balls | Innings | Against | Venue | Country | Date | Result |
|---|---|---|---|---|---|---|---|---|
| 1 | 143 | 186 | 1 | Bangladesh | Mangaung Oval, Bloemfontein | South Africa | 6 October 2017 | South Africa won by an innings and 254 runs |
| 2 | 125 | 204 | 1 | Zimbabwe | St George's Park, Port Elizabeth | South Africa | 26 December 2017 | South Africa won by an innings and 120 runs |
| 3 | 143 | 218 | 4 | Australia | Kingsmead Cricket Ground, Durban | South Africa | 1 March 2018 | Australia won by 118 runs |
| 4 | 152 | 216 | 1 | Australia | Wanderers Stadium, Johannesburg | South Africa | 30 March 2018 | South Africa won by 492 runs |
| 5 | 108 | 243 | 4 | Pakistan | Rawalpindi Cricket Stadium, Rawalpindi | Pakistan | 4 February 2021 | Pakistan won by 95 runs |
| 6 | 115 | 174 | 1 | West Indies | Centurion Park, Centurion | South Africa | 28 February 2023 | South Africa won by 87 runs |
| 7 | 106 | 103 | 3 | India | Newlands Cricket Ground, Cape Town | South Africa | 3 January 2024 | India won by 7 wickets |
| 8 | 136 | 207 | 4 | Australia | Lord's, London | England | 11 June 2025 | South Africa won by 5 wickets |

ODI centuries by Aiden Markram
| No. | Runs | Balls | Innings | Against | Venue | Country | Date | Result |
|---|---|---|---|---|---|---|---|---|
| 1 | 175 | 126 | 1 | Netherlands | Wanderers Stadium, Johannesburg | South Africa | 2 April 2023 | South Africa won by 146 runs |
| 2 | 102* | 74 | 1 | Australia | JB Marks Oval, Potchefstroom | South Africa | 12 September 2023 | South Africa won by 111 runs |
| 3 | 106 | 54 | 1 | Sri Lanka | Arun Jaitley Cricket Stadium, Delhi | India | 7 October 2023 | South Africa won by 102 runs |
| 4 | 110 | 98 | 2 | India | Shaheed Veer Narayan Singh International Cricket Stadium, Raipur | India | 3 December 2025 | South Africa won by 4 wickets |

== Awards and honours ==
Individual

- ICC T20I Team of the Year: 2021
