= Lungi Ngidi =

South African cricketer (born 1996)

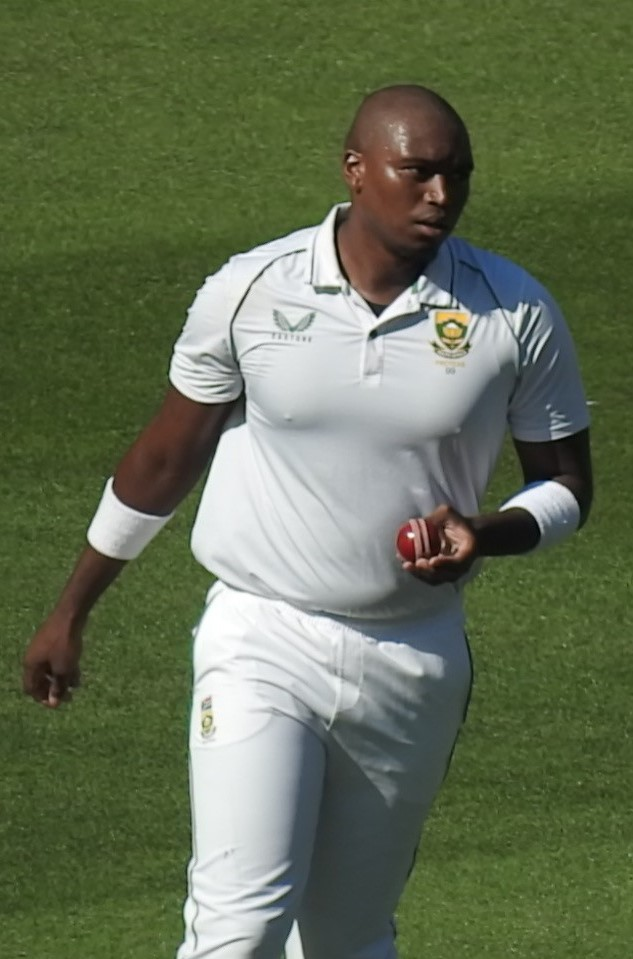
- Ngidi in 2022

Personal information
- Full name: Lungisani True-man Ngidi
- Born: 29 March 1996 (age 30); Durban, KwaZulu-Natal, South Africa
- Height: 6 ft 4 in (193 cm)
- Batting: Right-handed
- Bowling: Right-arm fast-medium
- Role: Bowler

International information
- National side: South Africa (2017–present)
- Test debut (cap 334): 13 January 2018 v India
- Last Test: 11 June 2025 v Australia
- ODI debut (cap 126): 7 February 2018 v India
- Last ODI: 6 December 2025 v India
- ODI shirt no.: 22
- T20I debut (cap 67): 20 January 2017 v Sri Lanka
- Last T20I: 4 March 2026 v New Zealand
- T20I shirt no.: 22

Domestic team information
- Years: Team
- 2015–present: Northerns
- 2016–2021: Titans
- 2018–2021: Chennai Super Kings
- 2022, 2026-present: Delhi Capitals
- 2023–present: Paarl Royals
- 2025: Royal Challengers Bengaluru
- 2026: Glasgow Cosmic

Career statistics
Competition	Test	ODI	T20I	FC
Matches	20	75	64	35
Runs scored	97	126	59	150
Batting average	4.85	9.00	11.80	5.55
100s/50s	0/0	0/0	0/0	0/0
Top score	19	20*	13*	19
Balls bowled	2,578	3,461	1,299	4,424
Wickets	58	115	90	99
Bowling average	23.37	29.13	20.73	24.11
5 wickets in innings	3	2	1	6
10 wickets in match	0	0	0	0
Best bowling	6/39	6/58	5/39	6/37
Catches/stumpings	7/–	18/–	11/–	12/–
Medal record
Men's cricket
Representing South Africa
World Test Championship
Winner	2023–2025
- Source: ESPNcricinfo, 26 September 2026

Lungisani True-man Ngidi (born 29 March 1996) is a South African professional cricketer who plays for the South Africa national cricket team. In the 2018 South African Cricket Annual Awards, he was named as one of the five Cricketers of the Year. In July 2020, Ngidi was named both ODI and T20I cricketer of the year at Cricket South Africa's annual awards ceremony. Ngidi was a member of the South African team which won the 2025 ICC World Test Championship.

== Early life ==
Ngidi was raised in Kloof, Durban and received a scholarship to attend Highbury Preparatory School. While growing up, Ngidi's mother was a domestic worker and his father was a maintenance worker at a local school. Ngidi received a scholarship to attend Hilton College School. During his first three years at Hilton, Ngidi represented Hilton at rugby before he stopped to focus on cricket. While at Hilton, Ngidi was coached by the former Zimbabwe all-rounder Neil Johnson.

After graduating from Hilton, Ngidi enrolled in a Bachelor of Social Sciences degree in Industrial Sociology at the University of Pretoria.

== Domestic and T20 franchise career ==
Ngidi was included in the Northerns cricket team for the 2015 Africa T20 Cup. In July 2016 Cricket South Africa named him as the Africa T20 Cup player of the year. In August 2017, he was named in Benoni Zalmi's squad for the first season of the T20 Global League. However, in October 2017, Cricket South Africa initially postponed the tournament until November 2018, with it being cancelled soon after.

In January 2018, Ngidi was bought by the Chennai Super Kings in the 2018 IPL auction. In October 2018, he was named in Tshwane Spartans' squad for the first edition of the Mzansi Super League T20 tournament. In March 2019, he was named as one of eight players to watch by the International Cricket Council (ICC) ahead of the 2019 Indian Premier League tournament.

In September 2019, Ngidi was named in the squad for the Tshwane Spartans team for the 2019 Mzansi Super League tournament. In April 2021, he was named in Northerns' squad, ahead of the 2021–22 cricket season in South Africa.

In February 2022, Ngidi was bought by the Delhi Capitals in the auction for the 2022 Indian Premier League tournament.

In May 2023, Major League Cricket (MLC) Team San Francisco Unicorns announced the signing of Ngidi for the inaugural season.

== International career ==
In January 2017 Ngidi was included in South Africa's Twenty20 International (T20I) squad for their series against Sri Lanka. He made his T20I debut for South Africa against Sri Lanka on 20 January 2017 and was awarded man of the match. During the T20I series, Ngidi was named in South Africa's squad for their One Day International (ODI) matches against Sri Lanka. However, he was ruled out of the ODI series because of an abdominal injury.

In January 2018, Ngidi was added to South Africa's Test squad ahead of the second Test against India. He made his Test debut for South Africa against India on 13 January 2018. He returned figures of 7/87 in the match, including 6/39 in the second innings, as South Africa won by 135 runs. Later the same month, he was named in South Africa's One Day International (ODI) squad for their series against India. He made his ODI debut against India on 7 February 2018.

In March 2018, Cricket South Africa awarded Ngidi a national contract, ahead of the 2018–19 season. In April 2019, he was named in South Africa's squad for the 2019 Cricket World Cup. On 4 March 2020, in the second ODI against Australia, Ngidi took his first five-wicket haul in ODI cricket. In the same match, he became the fastest bowler for South Africa, in terms of matches, to take 50 wickets in ODIs, doing so in his 26th game.

In September 2021, Ngidi was named in South Africa's squad for the 2021 ICC Men's T20 World Cup. In July 2022, in the first match of the series against England, Ngidi took his first five-wicket haul in T20I cricket.

In May 2024, he was named as a reserve player in South Africa’s squad for the 2024 ICC Men's T20 World Cup tournament.

In June 2025, Ngidi played in the 2025 World Test Championship final against Australia, South Africa's first appearance in a World Test Championship final. He had bowling figures of 0/45 in Australia's first innings and 3/38 in the second. His bowling in the second innings contributed substantially to South Africa's eventual five-wicket victory.

== International five-wicket hauls ==
Test five-wicket hauls by Lungi Ngidi
No.	Bowling Figures	Overs	Innings	Against	Venue	Country	Date	Result
1	6/39	12.2	4	India	Centurion Park, Centurion	South Africa	13 January 2018	South Africa won by 135 runs
2	5/19	13.5	1	West Indies	Darren Sammy Cricket Ground, Rodney Bay	Saint Lucia	10 June 2021	South Africa won by an innings and 63 runs
3	6/71	24	1	India	Centurion Park, Centurion	South Africa	26 December 2021	India won by 113 runs

ODI five-wicket hauls by Lungi Ngidi
No.	Bowling Figures	Overs	Innings	Against	Venue	Country	Date	Result
1	6/58	10	1	Australia	Mangaung Oval, Bloemfontein	South Africa	4 March 2020	South Africa won by 6 wickets
2	5/42	8.4	2	Australia	Great Barrier Reef Arena, Mackay	Australia	22 August 2025	South Africa won by 84 runs

== Activism ==
In July 2020, Ngidi called on the national team to have a discussion about the Black Lives Matter movement in South African cricket, and for the team to support the movement. He also addressed institutionalised racism in cricket. Ngidi said he would not mind taking the lead in the team's efforts, and stated, among other things: "We're all together again in person. We obviously have spoken about it and everyone's aware of what's been going on. But it's also currently a difficult (issue) because we're not together. I think it's something that's hard to discuss when we're all still separated, but once we get back to play, we'll address it". His comments garnered opposing views and criticism from former Proteas Rudi Steyn, Pat Symcox and Boeta Dippenaar. At least 30 former Proteas, all players of colour, along five coaches, released a collective statement, showing support for Ngidi and the BLM movement, while urging Cricket South Africa to "be unequivocal about its position and to make sure the problem is confronted".
