= Tristan Stubbs =

South African cricketer (born 2000)

Personal information
- Born: 14 August 2000 (age 26); Knysna, Western Cape, South Africa
- Height: 1.84 m (6 ft 0 in)
- Batting: Right-handed
- Bowling: Right-arm off break
- Role: Batsman

International information
- National side: South Africa (2022–present)
- Test debut (cap 359): 3 January 2024 v India
- Last Test: 14 November 2025 v India
- ODI debut (cap 148): 18 March 2023 v West Indies
- Last ODI: 7 September 2025 v England
- T20I debut (cap 95): 9 June 2022 v India
- Last T20I: 4 March 2026 v New Zealand

Domestic team information
- Years: Team
- 2019/20–present: Eastern Province
- 2022–2023: Mumbai Indians
- 2022: Manchester Originals
- 2022: Jaffna Kings
- 2023–present: Sunrisers Eastern Cape
- 2024–present: Delhi Capitals
- 2026: Hampshire
- 2026: Southern Brave

Career statistics
| Competition | Test | ODI | T20I | FC |
|---|---|---|---|---|
| Matches | 15 | 17 | 52 | 33 |
| Runs scored | 792 | 412 | 967 | 2,050 |
| Batting average | 30.46 | 27.46 | 30.21 | 41.00 |
| 100s/50s | 2/3 | 1/3 | 0/2 | 7/4 |
| Top score | 122 | 112* | 76 | 302* |
| Balls bowled | – | 24 | 12 | 336 |
| Wickets | – | 0 | 0 | 3 |
| Bowling average | – | – | – | 75.33 |
| 5 wickets in innings | – | – | – | 0 |
| 10 wickets in match | – | – | – | 0 |
| Best bowling | – | – | – | 1/13 |
| Catches/stumpings | 15/– | 2/– | 31/– | 30/– |
Medal record
Men's cricket
Representing South Africa
ICC World Test Championship
| Winner | 2023–2025 |
ICC T20 World Cup
| Runner-up | 2024 West Indies & USA |
- Source: ESPNcricinfo, 13 October 2026

Tristan Stubbs (born 14 August 2000) is a South African international cricketer. He plays for the South Africa national team as a right-handed batsman who occasionally bowls right-arm off-break. Stubbs was a member of the South African team which won the 2025 ICC World Test Championship.

== Domestic and franchise career ==
Stubbs made his first-class debut on 16 January 2020, for Eastern Province in the 2019–20 CSA 3-Day Provincial Cup. He made his List A debut on 16 February 2020, for Eastern Province in the 2019–20 CSA Provincial One-Day Challenge. He made his Twenty20 debut on 21 February 2021, for Warriors in the 2020–21 CSA T20 Challenge. In April 2021, he was named in Eastern Province's squad, ahead of the 2021–22 cricket season in South Africa.

Stubbs also holds a Dutch passport. In 2021 he signed with Excelsior '20 to play club cricket in the Dutch Topklasse.

In May 2022, the Mumbai Indians added Stubbs to their squad for the 2022 Indian Premier League (IPL), replacing Tymal Mills who was ruled out due to an injury. Later the same month, Stubbs was named in South Africa's Twenty20 International (T20I) squad for their series against India, his maiden international call-up. He made his T20I debut on 9 June 2022, for South Africa against India.

In July 2022, he was signed by the Jaffna Kings for the third edition of the Lanka Premier League.

In December 2023, Stubbs was signed by Delhi Capitals in the auction for the 2024 Indian Premier League. He scored 378 runs that season at a strike rate of 191. He was retained the following season ahead of the 2025 Mega Auction, and that season amassed 300 runs at a strike rate of 151.

== International career ==
In March 2023, Stubbs was named in South Africa's One Day International (ODI) squad for their series against West Indies. He made his ODI debut in the second ODI of the series on 18 March 2023. He scored his first ODI ton against Ireland in 2024.

Stubbs made his Test debut against India in January 2024. He became the first player in 127 years to be dismissed twice on the first day of his Test debut.

In May 2024, he was named in South Africa's squad for the 2024 ICC Men's T20 World Cup tournament.

Stubbs made his first Test century against Bangladesh in October 2024, scoring 106.

In 2025, he was named in the South Africa squad for the 2025 ICC Champions Trophy.

== International centuries ==
Test centuries by Tristan Stubbs
| No. | Runs | Balls | Innings | Against | Venue | Country | Date | Result |
|---|---|---|---|---|---|---|---|---|
| 1 | 106 | 198 | 1 | Bangladesh | Zahur Ahmed Chowdhury Stadium, Chittagong | Bangladesh | 29 October 2024 | South Africa won by an innings and 273 runs |
| 2 | 122 | 221 | 3 | Sri Lanka | Kingsmead Cricket Ground, Durban | South Africa | 27 November 2027 | Pakistan won by 233 runs |

ODI centuries by Tristan Stubbs
| No. | Runs | Balls | Innings | Against | Venue | Country | Date | Result |
|---|---|---|---|---|---|---|---|---|
| 1 | 112* | 81 | 1 | Ireland | Sheikh Zayed Cricket Stadium, Abu Dhabi | United Arab Emirates | 4 October 2024 | South African won by 174 runs |
