= Wiaan Mulder =

South African cricketer (born 1998)

Personal information
- Full name: Pieter Willem Adriaan Mulder
- Born: 19 February 1998 (age 28); Johannesburg, Gauteng, South Africa
- Height: 1.85 m (6 ft 1 in)
- Batting: Right-handed
- Bowling: Right-arm medium
- Role: All-rounder

International information
- National side: South Africa (2017–present)
- Test debut (cap 336): 21 February 2019 v Sri Lanka
- Last Test: 22 November 2025 v India
- ODI debut (cap 123): 22 October 2017 v Bangladesh
- Last ODI: 7 September 2025 v England
- ODI shirt no.: 24
- T20I debut (cap 93): 16 April 2021 v Pakistan
- Last T20I: 25 March 2026 v New Zealand
- T20I shirt no.: 24

Domestic team information
- Years: Team
- 2016/17–2020/21: Lions
- 2017/18–: Gauteng
- 2019: Kent (squad no. 14)
- 2019/20: Tshwane Spartans
- 2022–2024: Leicestershire
- 2023–2024: Durban's Super Giants
- 2025: Sunrisers Hyderabad
- 2025–present: Joburg Super Kings
- 2026: Essex

Career statistics
Competition	Test	ODI	T20I	FC
Matches	28	30	15	103
Runs scored	1,440	338	152	5,709
Batting average	35.12	18.77	15.20	39.64
100s/50s	4/1	0/2	0/0	16/19
Top score	367*	64	36	367*
Balls bowled	2,649	944	174	11,911
Wickets	48	26	13	245
Bowling average	26.81	38.23	20.92	26.22
5 wickets in innings	0	0	0	5
10 wickets in match	0	0	0	1
Best bowling	4/32	3/25	2/10	7/6
Catches/stumpings	35/–	9/–	7/–	87/–
Medal record
Men's cricket
Representing South Africa
World Test Championship
Winner	2023–2025
- Source: CricInfo, 19 November 2026

Pieter Willem Adriaan Mulder (born 19 February 1998), known as Wiaan Mulder, is a South African first-class cricketer. He made his One Day International (ODI) debut for South Africa in October 2017 and his Test debut in March 2019. In domestic cricket, Mulder plays for Gauteng Lions. Mulder was a member of the South African team which won the 2025 World Test Championship final, the second ICC title the country had won.

== Early life ==
Mulder was born in Johannesburg and educated at St Stithians College. He played age-group cricket for Gauteng from under-13 level onwards.

== Domestic career ==
Mulder made his first-class cricket debut at The Wanderers for Highveld Lions against Cape Cobras in the 2016–17 Sunfoil Series in October 2016 whist still at school. He took seven wickets on debut, including 3/10 in the Cobras first innings. Prior to his debut, he was part of South Africa's squad for the 2016 Under-19 Cricket World Cup. He made his Twenty20 (T20) debut for Highveld Lions in the 2016–17 CSA T20 Challenge in November 2016 and his List A debut in the 2016–17 Momentum One Day Cup in February 2017.

In June 2018, he was named in the squad for the Highveld Lions team for the 2018–19 season. In September 2018, he was named in Gauteng's squad for the 2018 Africa T20 Cup. In May 2019, Mulder signed with Kent County Cricket Club to play in the 2019 County Championship in England. He played in three matches for Kent before being recalled to the South African team, ahead of their international schedule.

In September 2019, he was named in the squad for the Tshwane Spartans team for the 2019 Mzansi Super League tournament. In January 2021, Mulder signed with Leicestershire County Cricket Club to play in domestic cricket in England. In April 2021, he was named in Gauteng's squad, ahead of the 2021–22 cricket season in South Africa.

In November 2021, Mulder was signed by Leicestershire County Cricket Club to play in England during the 2022 season. In July 2022, in the County Championship, Mulder scored his maiden double century in first-class cricket with 235 not out.

== International career ==
In October 2017, he was added to South Africa's ODI squad for their series against Bangladesh and made his international debut on 22 October aged 18.

In February 2018, he was named in South Africa's Test squad for their series against Australia, but did not play, and in August 2018 was named in the Twenty20 International (T20I) squad for the one-off match against Sri Lanka, but again did not play in the fixture. In January 2019, he was again named in South Africa's T20I squad, this time for their series against Pakistan, but did not play again. In February, Mulder was once again named in South Africa's squad, this time for their Test series against Sri Lanka. He made his Test debut during the series.

In April 2021, Mulder was added to South Africa's T20I squad for their series against Pakistan. He made his T20I debut during the series. In September 2021, he was named in South Africa's squad for the 2021 ICC Men's T20 World Cup.

Mulder scored his first Test century against Bangladesh in October 2024, making 105 not out. In June 2025 he scored his second Test century, making 147 against Zimbabwe in the first Test at Bulawayo. He was named captain for the second Test of the series, scoring 367 not out before declaring the South African first innings. This set new records for South Africa's highest individual Test score, the highest by a captain in a Test match, and was 33 runs short of the 400 not out that West Indian Brian Lara scored against England in 2004. In a post match interview, Mulder said that he did not want to break Lara's record out of respect for him as a "legend".

== International centuries ==
Test centuries by Wiaan Mulder
No.	Runs	Balls	Innings	Against	Venue	Country	Date	Result
1	105*	150	1	Bangladesh	Zahur Ahmed Chowdhury Stadium, Chittagong	Bangladesh	29 October 2024	South Africa won by an innings and 273 runs
2	147	206	3	Zimbabwe	Queens Sports Club, Bulawayo	Zimbabwe	28 June 2025	South Africa won by 328 runs
3	367*	334	1	Zimbabwe	Queens Sports Club, Bulawayo	Zimbabwe	6 July 2025	South Africa won by an innings and 236 runs
4	115	221	3	Australia	Newlands Cricket Ground, Cape Town	South Africa	27 October 2026	South Africa won by 176 runs
