= 2023–2025 World Test Championship =

Third edition of World Test Championship

2023–2025 ICC World Test Championship
- Dates: 16 June 2023 – 14 June 2025
- Administrator: International Cricket Council
- Cricket format: Test cricket
- Tournament format(s): League and Final
- Champions: South Africa (1st title)
- Runners-up: Australia
- Participants: 9
- Matches: 70
- Most runs: (England) Joe Root (1,968)
- Most wickets: (Australia) Pat Cummins (80)
- Official website: ICC World Test Championship

The 2023–2025 ICC World Test Championship was the third edition of the ICC World Test Championship. It started in June 2023 with the Ashes, which was contested between England and Australia, and it finished in June 2025 with the final, played between Australia and South Africa at Lord's.

In the final, South Africa defeated Australia by 5 wickets to win their maiden championship. This was also their first ICC trophy since 1998.

== Format ==
The tournament consisted of 69 matches played between nine teams across 27 series in the league stage. The top two teams in the points table at the end of the league stage competed at the final at Lord's, London. Each team plays six series, three at home and three away, with each series containing two to five Test matches.

=== Points system ===
The points system remained largely unchanged from the previous edition. Teams failing to meet the required over rate were deducted one point for each over they were behind at the end of a match, except in cases where they bowled their opponents out in 80 overs in an innings, or 160 overs over the course of the match. As in the previous edition, the teams are ranked in the league table based on percentage of total points won out of contested points.

Points system
| Match result | Points earned | Points contested | Percentage of points won |
|---|---|---|---|
| Win | 12 | 12 | 100 |
| Tie | 6 | 12 | 50 |
| Draw | 4 | 12 | 33.33 |
| Loss | 0 | 12 | 0 |

== Participants ==
Nine of the 12 full members of the International Cricket Council (ICC) participated in the championship:

- Australia
- Bangladesh
- England
- India
- New Zealand
- Pakistan
- South Africa
- Sri Lanka
- West Indies

The three full members of the ICC who did not participate were Afghanistan, Ireland and Zimbabwe.

== Schedule ==
The ICC announced the 2023–2027 Future Tours Programme on 17 August 2022, which identified the series that were part of the World Test Championship. According to the schedule, each team played six of the other eight teams, and the dates and venues of each series were decided by the boards of the competing teams.

| Home \ Away | AUS | BAN | ENG | IND | NZL | PAK | RSA | SRI | WIN |
|---|---|---|---|---|---|---|---|---|---|
| Australia | — | — | — | 3–1 [5] | — | 3–0 [3] | — | — | 1–1 [2] |
| Bangladesh | — | — | — | — | 1–1 [2] | — | 0–2 [2] | 0–2 [2] | — |
| England | 2–2 [5] | — | — | — | — | — | — | 2–1 [3] | 3–0 [3] |
| India | — | 2–0 [2] | 4–1 [5] | — | 0–3 [3] | — | — | — | |
| New Zealand | 0–2 [2] | — | 1–2 [3] | | — | | 2–0 [2] | — | — |
| Pakistan | — | 0–2 [2] | 2–1 [3] | — | — | — | — | — | 1–1 [2] |
| South Africa | | — | — | 1–1 [2] | | 2–0 [2] | — | 2–0 [2] | |
| Sri Lanka | 0–2 [2] | — | — | — | 2–0 [2] | 0–2 [2] | — | — | — |
| West Indies | — | 1–1 [2] | — | 0–1 [2] | — | — | 0–1 [2] | — | — |

Updated to match(es) played on 9 February 2025. Source: ICC Men's FTP
Legend: Blue = home team win; Yellow = draw; Red = away team win.

| Team | Scheduled matches | | | Not scheduled to play against | |
| Team | Total | Home | Away | Not scheduled to play against | |
|---|---|---|---|---|---|
| Australia | 19 | India (5), Pakistan (3), West Indies (2) | England (5), New Zealand (2), Sri Lanka (2) | Bangladesh | South Africa |
| Bangladesh | 12 | New Zealand (2), South Africa (2), Sri Lanka (2) | India (2), Pakistan (2), West Indies (2) | Australia | England |
| England | 22 | Australia (5), Sri Lanka (3), West Indies (3) | India (5), New Zealand (3), Pakistan (3) | Bangladesh | South Africa |
| India | 19 | Bangladesh (2), England (5), New Zealand (3) | Australia (5), South Africa (2), West Indies (2) | Pakistan | Sri Lanka |
| New Zealand | 14 | Australia (2), England (3), South Africa (2) | Bangladesh (2), India (3), Sri Lanka (2) | Pakistan | West Indies |
| Pakistan | 14 | Bangladesh (2), England (3), West Indies (2) | Australia (3), South Africa (2), Sri Lanka (2) | India | New Zealand |
| South Africa | 12 | India (2), Pakistan (2), Sri Lanka (2) | Bangladesh (2), New Zealand (2), West Indies (2) | Australia | England |
| Sri Lanka | 13 | Australia (2), New Zealand (2), Pakistan (2) | Bangladesh (2), England (3), South Africa (2) | India | West Indies |
| West Indies | 13 | Bangladesh (2), India (2), South Africa (2) | Australia (2), England (3), Pakistan (2) | New Zealand | Sri Lanka |

== League table ==
| Pos | Team | Pld | W | L | D | T | Ded | Con | Pts | Pct | Qualification |
|---|---|---|---|---|---|---|---|---|---|---|---|
| 1 | South Africa (C) | 12 | 8 | 3 | 1 | 0 | 0 | 144 | 100 | 69.44 | 2025 World Test Championship final |
| 2 | Australia | 19 | 13 | 4 | 2 | 0 | 10 | 228 | 154 | 67.54 (Note: Australia were deducted a total 10 points for a slow over-rate in the fourth Test against England.) | 2025 World Test Championship final |
| 3 | India | 19 | 9 | 8 | 2 | 0 | 2 | 228 | 114 | 50 (Note: India were deducted a total 2 points for a slow over-rate in the first Test against South Africa.) | |
| 4 | New Zealand | 14 | 7 | 7 | 0 | 0 | 3 | 168 | 81 | 48.21 (Note: New Zealand were deducted a total 3 points for a slow over-rate in the first Test against England.) | |
| 5 | England | 22 | 11 | 10 | 1 | 0 | 22 | 264 | 114 | 43.18 (Note: England were deducted a total 19 points for a slow over-rate in the first, second, fourth, and fifth Tests against Australia, and 3 points for a slow over-rate in the first Test against New Zealand.) | |
| 6 | Sri Lanka | 13 | 5 | 8 | 0 | 0 | 0 | 156 | 60 | 38.46 | |
| 7 | Bangladesh | 12 | 4 | 8 | 0 | 0 | 3 | 144 | 45 | 31.25 (Note: Bangladesh were deducted a total 3 points for a slow over-rate in the first Test against Pakistan.) | |
| 8 | West Indies | 13 | 3 | 8 | 2 | 0 | 0 | 156 | 44 | 28.21 | |
| 9 | Pakistan | 14 | 5 | 9 | 0 | 0 | 13 | 168 | 47 | 27.98 (Note: Pakistan were deducted 2 points points for a slow over-rate in the first Test against Australia, 6 points for a slow over-rate in the first Test against Bangladesh, and 5 points for a slow over-rate in the second Test against South Africa.) | |

Source: International Cricket Council, ESPNcricinfo

== League stage ==
=== 2023 ===
==== The Ashes (England v Australia) ====
16–20 June 2023
Scorecard

| England; 393/8d (78 overs) & 273 (66.2 overs) | v | Australia; 386 (116.1 overs) & 282/8 (92.3 overs) |

Australia won by 2 wickets
Edgbaston, Birmingham
Points: Australia 12, England -2

28 June – 2 July 2023
Scorecard

| Australia; 416 (100.4 overs) & 279 (101.5 overs) | v | England; 325 (76.2 overs) & 327 (81.3 overs) |

Australia won by 43 runs
Lord's, London
Points: Australia 12, England -9

6–10 July 2023
Scorecard

| Australia; 263 (60.4 overs) & 224 (67.1 overs) | v | England; 237 (52.3 overs) & 254/7 (50 overs) |

England won by 3 wickets
Headingley, Leeds
Points: England 12, Australia 0

19–23 July 2023
Scorecard

| Australia; 317 (90.2 overs) & 214/5 (71 overs) | v | England; 592 (107.4 overs) |

Match drawn
Old Trafford, Manchester
Points: England 1, Australia -6

27–31 July 2023
Scorecard

| England; 283 (54.4 overs) & 395 (81.5 overs) | v | Australia; 295 (103.1 overs) & 334 (94.4 overs) |

England won by 49 runs
The Oval, London
Points: England 7, Australia 0

==== West Indies v India ====
12–14 July 2023
Scorecard

| West Indies; 150 (64.3 overs) & 130 (50.3 overs) | v | India; 421/5d (152.2 overs) |

India won by an innings and 141 runs
Windsor Park, Roseau
Points: India 12, West Indies 0

20–24 July 2023
Scorecard

| India; 438 (128 overs) & 181/2d (24 overs) | v | West Indies; 255 (115.4 overs) & 71/2 (32 overs) |

Match drawn
Queen's Park Oval, Port of Spain
Points: West Indies 4, India 4

==== Sri Lanka v Pakistan ====
16–20 July 2023
Scorecard

| Sri Lanka; 312 (95.2 overs) & 279 (83.1 overs) | v | Pakistan; 461 (121.2 overs) & 133/6 (32.5 overs) |

Pakistan won by 4 wickets
Galle International Stadium, Galle
Points: Pakistan 12, Sri Lanka 0

24–27 July 2023
Scorecard

| Sri Lanka; 166 (48.2 overs) & 188 (67.4 overs) | v | Pakistan; 576/5d (134 overs) |

Pakistan won by an innings and 222 runs
Singhalese Sports Club Cricket Ground, Colombo
Points: Pakistan 12, Sri Lanka 0

=== 2023–24 ===
==== Bangladesh v New Zealand ====
28 November – 2 December 2023
Scorecard

| Bangladesh; 310 (85.1 overs) & 338 (100.4 overs) | v | New Zealand; 317 (101.5 overs) & 181 (71.1 overs) |

Bangladesh won by 150 runs
Sylhet International Cricket Stadium, Sylhet
Points: Bangladesh 12, New Zealand 0

6–9 December 2023
Scorecard

| Bangladesh; 172 (66.2 overs) & 144 (35 overs) | v | New Zealand; 180 (37.1 overs) & 139/6 (39.4 overs) |

New Zealand won by 4 wickets
Sher-e-Bangla National Cricket Stadium, Mirpur
Points: New Zealand 12, Bangladesh 0

==== Benaud–Qadir Trophy (Australia v Pakistan) ====
14–17 December 2023
Scorecard

| Australia; 487 (113.2 overs) & 5/233d (63.2 overs) | v | Pakistan; 271 (101.5 overs) & 89 (30.2 overs) |

Australia won by 360 runs
Perth Stadium, Perth
Points: Australia 12, Pakistan –2

26–29 December 2023
Scorecard

| Australia; 318 (96.5 overs) & 262 (84.1 overs) | v | Pakistan; 264 (73.5 overs) & 237 (67.2 overs) |

Australia won by 79 runs
Melbourne Cricket Ground, Melbourne
Points: Australia 12, Pakistan 0

3–6 January 2024
Scorecard

| Pakistan; 313 (77.1 overs) & 115 (43.1 overs) | v | Australia; 299 (109.4 overs) & 2/130 (25.5 overs) |

Australia won by 8 wickets
Sydney Cricket Ground, Sydney
Points: Australia 12, Pakistan 0

==== Freedom Trophy (South Africa v India) ====
26–29 December 2023
Scorecard

| India; 245 (67.4 overs) & 131 (34.1 overs) | v | South Africa; 408 (108.4 overs) |

South Africa won by an innings and 32 runs
Centurion Park, Centurion
Points: South Africa 12, India –2

3–4 January 2024
Scorecard

| South Africa; 55 (23.2 overs) & 176 (36.5 overs) | v | India; 153 (34.5 overs) & 80/3 (12 overs) |

India won by 7 wickets
Newlands Cricket Ground, Cape Town
Points: India 12, South Africa 0

==== Frank Worrell Trophy (Australia v West Indies) ====
17–19 January 2024
Scorecard

| West Indies; 188 (62.1 overs) & 120 (35.2 overs) | v | Australia; 283 (81.1 overs) & 26/0 (6.4 overs) |

Australia won by 10 wickets
Adelaide Oval, Adelaide
Points: Australia 12, West Indies 0

25–28 January 2024 (D/N)
Scorecard

| West Indies; 311 (108 overs) & 193 (72.3 overs) | v | Australia; 9/289d (53 overs) & 207 (50.5 overs) |

West Indies won by 8 runs
The Gabba, Brisbane
Points: West Indies 12, Australia 0

==== Anthony de Mello Trophy (India v England) ====
25–28 January 2024
Scorecard

| England; 246 (64.3 overs) & 420 (102.1 overs) | v | India; 436 (121 overs) & 202 (69.2 overs) |

England won by 28 runs
Rajiv Gandhi International Stadium, Hyderabad
Points: England 12, India 0

2–5 February 2024
Scorecard

| India; 396 (112 overs) & 255 (78.3 overs) | v | England; 253 (55.5 overs) & 292 (69.2 overs) |

India won by 106 runs
Dr. Y. S. Rajasekhara Reddy ACA-VDCA Cricket Stadium, Visakhapatnam
Points: India 12, England 0

15–18 February 2024
Scorecard

| India; 445 (130.5 overs) & 430/4d (98 overs) | v | England; 319 (71.1 overs) & 122 (39.4 overs) |

India won by 434 runs
Niranjan Shah Stadium, Rajkot
Points: India 12, England 0

23–26 February 2024
Scorecard

| England; 353 (104.5 overs) & 145 (53.5 overs) | v | India; 307 (103.2 overs) & 192/5 (61 overs) |

India won by 5 wickets
JSCA International Stadium Complex, Ranchi
Points: India 12, England 0

7–9 March 2024
Scorecard

| England; 218 (57.4 overs) & 195 (48.1 overs) | v | India; 477 (124.1 overs) |

India won by an innings and 64 runs
Himachal Pradesh Cricket Association Stadium, Dharamsala
Points: India 12, England 0

==== Tangiwai Shield (New Zealand v South Africa) ====
4–7 February 2024
Scorecard

| New Zealand; 511 (144 overs) & 179/4d (43 overs) | v | South Africa; 162 (72.5 overs) & 247 (80 overs) |

New Zealand won by 281 runs
Bay Oval, Mount Maunganui
Points: New Zealand 12, South Africa 0

13–16 February 2024
Scorecard

| South Africa; 242 (97.2 overs) & 235 (69.5 overs) | v | New Zealand; 211 (77.3 overs) & 269/3 (94.2 overs) |

New Zealand won by 7 wickets
Seddon Park, Hamilton
Points: New Zealand 12, South Africa 0

==== Trans–Tasman Trophy (New Zealand v Australia) ====
29 February–4 March 2024
Scorecard

| Australia; 383 (115.1 overs) & 164 (51.1 overs) | v | New Zealand; 179 (43.1 overs) & 196 (64.4 overs) |

Australia won by 172 runs
Basin Reserve, Wellington
Points: Australia 12, New Zealand 0

8–11 March 2024
Scorecard

| New Zealand; 162 (45.2 overs) & 372 (108.2 overs) | v | Australia; 256 (68 overs) & 281/7 (65 overs) |

Australia won by 3 wickets
Hagley Oval, Christchurch
Points: Australia 12, New Zealand 0

==== Bangladesh v Sri Lanka ====
22–26 March 2024
Scorecard

| Sri Lanka; 280 (68 overs) & 418 (110.4 overs) | v | Bangladesh; 188 (51.3 overs) & 182 (49.2 overs) |

Sri Lanka won by 328 runs
Sylhet International Cricket Stadium, Sylhet
Points: Sri Lanka 12, Bangladesh 0

30 March–3 April 2024
Scorecard

| Sri Lanka; 531 (159 overs) & 157/7d (40 overs) | v | Bangladesh; 178 (68.4 overs) & 318 (85 overs) |

Sri Lanka won by 192 runs
Zohur Ahmed Chowdhury Stadium, Chattogram
Points: Sri Lanka 12, Bangladesh 0

=== 2024 ===
==== Richards–Botham Trophy (England v West Indies) ====
10–12 July 2024
Scorecard

| West Indies; 121 (41.4 overs) & 136 (47 overs) | v | England; 371 (90 overs) |

England won by an innings and 114 runs
Lord's, London
Points: England 12, West Indies 0

18–21 July 2024
Scorecard

| England; 416 (88.3 overs) & 425 (92.2 overs) | v | West Indies; 457 (111.5 overs) & 143 (36.1 overs) |

England won by 241 runs
Trent Bridge, Nottingham
Points: England 12, West Indies 0

26–28 July 2024
Scorecard

| West Indies; 282 (75.1 overs) & 175 (52 overs) | v | England; 376 (75.4 overs) & 87/0 (7.2 overs) |

England won by 10 wickets
Edgbaston, Birmingham
Points: England 12, West Indies 0

==== Sir Vivian Richards Trophy (West Indies v South Africa) ====
7–11 August 2024
Scorecard

| South Africa; 357 (117.4 overs) & 173/3d (29 overs) | v | West Indies; 233 (91.5 overs) & 201/5 (56.2 overs) |

Match drawn
Queen's Park Oval, Port of Spain
Points: South Africa 4, West Indies 4

15–17 August 2024
Scorecard

| South Africa; 160 (54 overs) & 246 (80.4 overs) | v | West Indies; 144 (42.4 overs) & 222 (66.2 overs) |

South Africa won by 40 runs
Providence Stadium, Providence
Points: South Africa 12, West Indies 0

==== Pakistan v Bangladesh ====
21–25 August 2024
Scorecard

| Pakistan; 448/6d (113 overs) & 146 (55.5 overs) | v | Bangladesh; 565 (167.3 overs) & 30/0 (6.3 overs) |

Bangladesh won by 10 wickets
Rawalpindi Cricket Stadium, Rawalpindi
Points: Bangladesh 9, Pakistan -6

30 August – 3 September 2024
Scorecard

| Pakistan; 274 (85.1 overs) & 172 (46.4 overs) | v | Bangladesh; 262 (78.4 overs) & 185/4 (56 overs) |

Bangladesh won by 6 wickets
Rawalpindi Cricket Stadium, Rawalpindi
Points: Bangladesh 12, Pakistan 0

==== England v Sri Lanka ====
21–24 August 2024
Scorecard

| Sri Lanka; 236 (74 overs) & 326 (89.3 overs) | v | England; 358 (85.3 overs) & 205/5 (57.2 overs) |

England won by 5 wickets
Old Trafford, Manchester
Points: England 12, Sri Lanka 0

29 August–1 September 2024
Scorecard

| England; 427 (102 overs) & 251 (54.3 overs) | v | Sri Lanka; 196 (55.3 overs) & 292 (86.4 overs) |

England won by 190 runs
Lord's, London
Points: England 12, Sri Lanka 0

6–9 September 2024
Scorecard

| England; 325 (69.1 overs) & 156 (34 overs) | v | Sri Lanka; 263 (61.2 overs) & 219/2 (40.3 overs) |

Sri Lanka won by 8 wickets
The Oval, London
Points: Sri Lanka 12, England 0

=== 2024–25 ===
==== Sri Lanka v New Zealand ====
18–23 September 2024
Scorecard

| Sri Lanka; 305 (91.5 overs) & 309 (94.2 overs) | v | New Zealand; 340 (90.5 overs) & 211 (71.4 overs) |

Sri Lanka won by 63 runs
Galle International Stadium, Galle
Points: Sri Lanka 12, New Zealand 0

26–29 September 2024
Scorecard

| Sri Lanka; 602/5d (163.4 overs) | v | New Zealand; 88 (39.5 overs) & 360 (81.4 overs) (f/o) |

Sri Lanka won by an innings and 154 runs
Galle International Stadium, Galle
Points: Sri Lanka 12, New Zealand 0

==== Ganguly–Durjoy Trophy (India v Bangladesh) ====
19–22 September 2024
Scorecard

| India; 376 (91.2 overs) & 287/4d (64 overs) | v | Bangladesh; 149 (47.1 overs) & 234 (62.1 overs) |

India won by 280 runs
M. A. Chidambaram Stadium, Chennai
Points: India 12, Bangladesh 0

27 September – 1 October 2024
Scorecard

| Bangladesh; 233 (74.2 overs) & 146 (47 overs) | v | India; 285/9d (34.4 overs) & 98/3 (17.2 overs) |

India won by 7 wickets
Green Park Stadium, Kanpur
Points: India 12, Bangladesh 0

==== Pakistan v England ====
7–11 October 2024
Scorecard

| Pakistan; 556 (149 overs) & 220 (54.5 overs) | v | England; 823/7d (150 overs) |

England won by an innings and 47 runs
Multan Cricket Stadium, Multan
Points: England 12, Pakistan 0

15–18 October 2024
Scorecard

| Pakistan; 366 (123.3 overs) & 221 (59.2 overs) | v | England; 291 (67.2 overs) & 144 (33.3 overs) |

Pakistan won by 152 runs
Multan Cricket Stadium, Multan
Points: Pakistan 12, England 0

24–26 October 2024
Scorecard

| England; 267 (68.2 overs) & 112 (37.2 overs) | v | Pakistan; 344 (96.4 overs) & 37/1 (3.1 overs) |

Pakistan won by 9 wickets
Rawalpindi Cricket Stadium, Rawalpindi
Points: Pakistan 12, England 0

==== India v New Zealand ====
16–20 October 2024
Scorecard

| India; 46 (31.2 overs) & 462 (99.3 overs) | v | New Zealand; 402 (91.3 overs) & 110/2 (27.4 overs) |

New Zealand won by 8 wickets
M. Chinnaswamy Stadium, Bengaluru
Points: New Zealand 12, India 0

24–26 October 2024
Scorecard

| New Zealand; 259 (79.1 overs) & 255 (69.4 overs) | v | India; 156 (45.3 overs) & 245 (60.2 overs) |

New Zealand won by 113 runs
Maharashtra Cricket Association Stadium, Pune
Points: New Zealand 12, India 0

1–3 November 2024
Scorecard

| New Zealand; 235 (65.4 overs) & 174 (45.5 overs) | v | India; 263 (59.4 overs) & 121 (29.1 overs) |

New Zealand won by 25 runs
Wankhede Stadium, Mumbai
Points: New Zealand 12, India 0

==== Bangladesh v South Africa ====
21–24 October 2024
Scorecard

| Bangladesh; 106 (40.1 overs) & 307 (89.5 overs) | v | South Africa; 308 (88.4 overs) & 106/3 (22 overs) |

South Africa won by 7 wickets
Sher-e-Bangla National Cricket Stadium, Dhaka
Points: South Africa 12, Bangladesh 0

29–31 October 2024
Scorecard

| South Africa; 575/6d (144.2 overs) | v | Bangladesh; 159 (45.2 overs) & 143 (43 overs) (f/o) |

South Africa won by an innings and 273 runs
Zohur Ahmed Chowdhury Stadium, Chittagong
Points: South Africa 12, Bangladesh 0

==== Border–Gavaskar Trophy (Australia v India) ====
22–25 November 2024
Scorecard

| India; 150 (49.4 overs) & 6/487d (134.3 overs) | v | Australia; 104 (51.2 overs) & 238 (58.4 overs) |

India won by 295 runs
Perth Stadium, Perth
Points: India 12, Australia 0

6–8 December 2024 (D/N)
Scorecard

| India; 180 (44.1 overs) & 175 (36.5 overs) | v | Australia; 337 (87.3 overs) & 0/19 (3.2 overs) |

Australia won by 10 wickets
Adelaide Oval, Adelaide
Points: Australia 12, India 0

14–18 December 2024
Scorecard

| Australia; 445 (117.1 overs) & 7/89d (18 overs) | v | India; 260 (78.5 overs) & 0/8 (2.1 overs) |

Match drawn
The Gabba, Brisbane
Points: Australia 4, India 4

26–30 December 2024
Scorecard

| Australia; 474 (122.4 overs) & 234 (83.4 overs) | v | India; 369 (119.3 overs) & 155 (79.1 overs) |

Australia won by 184 runs
Melbourne Cricket Ground, Melbourne
Points: Australia 12, India 0

3–5 January 2025
Scorecard

| India; 185 (72.2 overs) & 156 (39.5 overs) | v | Australia; 181 (51 overs) & 4/162 (27 overs) |

Australia won by 6 wickets
Sydney Cricket Ground, Sydney
Points: Australia 12, India 0

==== West Indies v Bangladesh ====
22–26 November 2024
Scorecard

| West Indies; 450/9d (144.1 overs) & 152 (46.1 overs) | v | Bangladesh; 269/9d (98 overs) & 132 (38 overs) |

West Indies won by 201 runs
Sir Vivian Richards Stadium, North Sound
Points: West Indies 12, Bangladesh 0

30 November – 3 December 2024
Scorecard

| Bangladesh; 164 (71.5 overs) & 268 (59.5 overs) | v | West Indies; 146 (65 overs) & 185 (50 overs) |

Bangladesh won by 101 runs
Sabina Park, Kingston
Points: Bangladesh 12, West Indies 0

==== South Africa v Sri Lanka ====
27–30 November 2024
Scorecard

| South Africa; 191 (49.4 overs) & 366/5d (100.4 overs) | v | Sri Lanka; 42 (13.5 overs) & 282 (79.4 overs) |

South Africa won by 233 runs
Kingsmead, Durban
Points: South Africa 12, Sri Lanka 0

5–9 December 2024
Scorecard

| South Africa; 358 (103.4 overs) & 317 (86 overs) | v | Sri Lanka; 328 (99.2 overs) & 238 (69.1 overs) |

South Africa won by 109 runs
St George's Park Cricket Ground, Gqeberha
Points: South Africa 12, Sri Lanka 0

==== Crowe–Thorpe Trophy (New Zealand v England) ====
28 November – 2 December 2024
Scorecard

| New Zealand; 348 (91 overs) & 254 (74.1 overs) | v | England; 499 (103 overs) & 104/2 (12.4 overs) |

England won by 8 wickets
Hagley Oval, Christchurch
Points: England 9, New Zealand –3

6–8 December 2024
Scorecard

| England; 280 (54.4 overs) & 427/6d (82.3 overs) | v | New Zealand; 125 (34.5 overs) & 259 (54.2 overs) |

England won by 323 runs
Basin Reserve, Wellington
Points: England 12, New Zealand 0

14–17 December 2024
Scorecard

| New Zealand; 347 (97.1 overs) & 453 (101.4 overs) | v | England; 143 (35.4 overs) & 234 (47.2 overs) |

New Zealand won by 423 runs
Seddon Park, Hamilton
Points: New Zealand 12, England 0

==== South Africa v Pakistan ====
26–29 December 2024
Scorecard

| Pakistan; 211 (57.3 overs) & 237 (59.4 overs) | v | South Africa; 301 (73.4 overs) & 150/8 (39.3 overs) |

South Africa won by 2 wickets
Centurion Park, Centurion
Points: South Africa 12, Pakistan 0

3–6 January 2025
Scorecard

| South Africa; 615 (141.3 overs) & 61/0 (7.1 overs) | v | Pakistan; 194 (54.2 overs) & 478 (122.1 overs) (f/o) |

South Africa won by 10 wickets
Newlands Cricket Ground, Cape Town
Points: South Africa 12, Pakistan -5

==== Pakistan v West Indies ====
17–19 January 2025
Scorecard

| Pakistan; 230 (68.5 overs) & 157 (46.4 overs) | v | West Indies; 137 (25.2 overs) & 123 (36.3 overs) |

Pakistan won by 127 runs
Multan Cricket Stadium, Multan
Points: Pakistan 12, West Indies 0

25–27 January 2025
Scorecard

| West Indies; 163 (41.1 overs) & 244 (66.1 overs) | v | Pakistan; 154 (47 overs) & 133 (44 overs) |

West Indies won by 120 runs
Multan Cricket Stadium, Multan
Points: West Indies 12, Pakistan 0

==== Warne–Muralitharan Trophy (Sri Lanka v Australia) ====
29 January – 2 February 2025
Scorecard

| Australia; 654/6d (154 overs) | v | Sri Lanka; 165 (52.2 overs) & 247 (54.3 overs) (f/o) |

Australia won by an innings and 242 runs
Galle International Stadium, Galle
Points: Australia 12, Sri Lanka 0

6–10 February 2025
Scorecard

| Sri Lanka; 257 (97.4 overs) & 231 (68.1 overs) | v | Australia; 414 (106.4 overs) & 75/1 (17.4 overs) |

Australia won by 9 wickets
Galle International Stadium, Galle
Points: Australia 12, Sri Lanka 0

== Final ==
11–14 June 2025
Scorecard

| Australia; 212 (56.4 overs) & 207 (65 overs) | v | South Africa; 138 (57.1 overs) & 282/5 (83.4 overs) |

South Africa won by 5 wickets
Lord's, London

== Statistics ==
=== Individual statistics ===
The top 5 players of each category are listed.

==== Most Runs ====
| Runs | Batter | Matches | Innings | Not outs | Average | High Score | 100s | 50s |
|---|---|---|---|---|---|---|---|---|
| 1,968 | (England) Joe Root | 22 | 40 | 4 | 54.66 | 262 | 7 | 7 |
| 1,738 | (India) Yashasvi Jaiswal | 19 | 36 | 2 | 52.88 | 214* | 4 | 10 |
| 1,470 | (England) Ben Duckett | 22 | 41 | 1 | 36.75 | 153 | 2 | 8 |
| 1,463 | (England) Harry Brook | 17 | 29 | 0 | 50.44 | 317 | 4 | 7 |
| 1,428 | (Australia) Usman Khawaja | 20 | 39 | 3 | 39.66 | 232 | 2 | 6 |
Last updated: 14 June 2025

==== Most Wickets ====
| Wickets | Bowler | Matches | Innings | Runs | Overs | BBI | BBM | Average | 5WI | 10WM |
|---|---|---|---|---|---|---|---|---|---|---|
| 80 | (Australia) Pat Cummins | 18 | 35 | 1,879 | 563.5 | 6/28 | 10/97 | 23.48 | 6 | 1 |
| 77 | (India) Jasprit Bumrah | 15 | 28 | 1,162 | 393.4 | 6/45 | 9/91 | 15.09 | 5 | 0 |
| 77 | (Australia) Mitchell Starc | 19 | 37 | 2,068 | 536.2 | 6/48 | 8/108 | 26.85 | 2 | 0 |
| 66 | (Australia) Nathan Lyon | 17 | 30 | 1,662 | 546.5 | 6/65 | 10/108 | 25.18 | 1 | 1 |
| 63 | (India) Ravichandran Ashwin | 14 | 26 | 1,547 | 445.3 | 7/71 | 12/131 | 24.55 | 5 | 1 |
Last updated: 14 June 2025

==== Highest Individual Score ====
| Runs | Batter | Balls | 4s | 6s | Opposition | Venue | Match date |
|---|---|---|---|---|---|---|---|
| 317 | (England) Harry Brook | 322 | 29 | 3 | Pakistan | Multan Cricket Stadium, Multan, Pakistan | 7 October 2024 |
| 262 | (England) Joe Root | 375 | 17 | 0 | Pakistan | Multan Cricket Stadium, Multan, Pakistan | 7 October 2024 |
| 259 | (South Africa) Ryan Rickelton | 343 | 29 | 3 | Pakistan | Newlands Cricket Ground, Cape Town, South Africa | 3 January 2025 |
| 240 | (New Zealand) Rachin Ravindra | 366 | 26 | 3 | South Africa | Bay Oval, Mount Maunganui, New Zealand | 4 February 2024 |
| 232 | (Australia) Usman Khawaja | 352 | 16 | 1 | Sri Lanka | Galle International Stadium, Galle, Sri Lanka | 29 January 2025 |
Last updated: 14 June 2025

==== Most dismissals for a wicket-keeper ====
| Dismissals | Player | Matches | Innings | Catches | Stumping | Max dis | Dis/Inn |
|---|---|---|---|---|---|---|---|
| 98 | (Australia) Alex Carey | 20 | 39 | 82 | 16 | 5 | 2.512 |
| 41 | (New Zealand) Tom Blundell | 14 | 27 | 35 | 6 | 4 | 1.518 |
| 39 | (Pakistan) Mohammad Rizwan | 11 | 21 | 33 | 6 | 6 | 1.857 |
| 39 | (South Africa) Kyle Verreynne | 12 | 24 | 35 | 4 | 5 | 1.772 |
| 38 | (Bangladesh) Litton Das | 9 | 18 | 32 | 6 | 4 | 2.111 |
Last updated: 14 June 2025

==== Most catches for a player ====
| Catches | Player | Matches | Innings | Max dis | Dis/Inn |
|---|---|---|---|---|---|
| 43 | (Australia) Steve Smith | 20 | 39 | 5 | 1.102 |
| 35 | (England) Joe Root | 22 | 43 | 3 | 0.813 |
| 24 | (New Zealand) Daryl Mitchell | 13 | 25 | 3 | 0.960 |
| 23 | (England) Ben Duckett | 22 | 43 | 2 | 0.534 |
| 21 | (England) Harry Brook | 17 | 34 | 3 | 0.617 |
Last updated: 14 June 2025

==== Best bowling figures in an innings ====
| Figures | Bowler | Overs | Maidens | Economy | Opposition | Venue | Match date |
|---|---|---|---|---|---|---|---|
| 8/46 | (Pakistan) Noman Ali | 16.3 | 1 | 2.78 | England | Multan Cricket Stadium, Multan, Pakistan | 15 October 2024 |
| 7/13 | (South Africa) Marco Jansen | 6.5 | 1 | 1.90 | Sri Lanka | Kingsmead Cricket Ground, Durban, South Africa | 27 November 2024 |
| 7/32 | (Cricket West Indies) Jomel Warrican | 18.0 | 3 | 1.77 | Pakistan | Multan Cricket Stadium, Multan, Pakistan | 17 January 2025 |
| 7/45 | (England) Gus Atkinson | 12.0 | 5 | 3.75 | West Indies | Lord's, London, England | 10 July 2024 |
| 7/53 | (New Zealand) Mitchell Santner | 19.3 | 1 | 2.71 | India | Maharashtra Cricket Association Stadium, Pune, India | 24 October 2024 |
Last updated: 14 June 2025

==== Best bowling figures in a match ====
| Figure | Bowler | Overs | Maidens | Opposition | Venue | Match date |
|---|---|---|---|---|---|---|
| 13/157 | (New Zealand) Mitchell Santner | 48.3 | 3 | India | Maharashtra Cricket Association Stadium, Pune, India | 24 October 2024 |
| 12/106 | (England) Gus Atkinson | 26.0 | 7 | West Indies | Lord's, London, England | 10 July 2024 |
| 12/131 | (India) Ravichandran Ashwin | 46.0 | 13 | West Indies | Windsor Park, Roseau, Dominica | 12 July 2023 |
| 11/86 | (South Africa) Marco Jansen | 28.3 | 6 | Sri Lanka | Kingsmead Cricket Ground, Durban, South Africa | 27 November 2024 |
| 11/115 | (India) Washington Sundar | 42.1 | 4 | New Zealand | Maharashtra Cricket Association Stadium, Pune, India | 24 October 2024 |
Last updated: 14 June 2025

==== Best batting averages ====
| Average | Batter | Matches | Innings | Runs | High score | NO | 100s | 50s |
|---|---|---|---|---|---|---|---|---|
| 62.38 | (Sri Lanka) Kamindu Mendis | 11 | 20 | 1,123 | 182* | 2 | 5 | 3 |
| 59.25 | (South Africa) Temba Bavuma | 8 | 13 | 711 | 113 | 1 | 2 | 5 |
| 54.85 | (New Zealand) Kane Williamson | 11 | 22 | 1,152 | 156 | 1 | 5 | 4 |
| 54.66 | (England) Joe Root | 22 | 40 | 1,968 | 262 | 4 | 7 | 7 |
| 52.88 | (India) Yashasvi Jaiswal | 19 | 36 | 1,798 | 214* | 2 | 4 | 10 |
Qualification: Minimum 10 innings Last updated: 14 June 2025

==== Best bowling averages ====
| Average | Bowler | Matches | Wickets | Runs | Balls | BBI | BBM |
|---|---|---|---|---|---|---|---|
| 14.76 | (Pakistan) Noman Ali | 6 | 46 | 679 | 1,272 | 8/46 | 11/147 |
| 15.09 | (India) Jasprit Bumrah | 15 | 77 | 1,162 | 2,362 | 6/45 | 9/91 |
| 17.18 | (Australia) Matthew Kuhnemann | 2 | 16 | 275 | 555 | 5/63 | 9/149 |
| 17.75 | (Cricket West Indies) Jomel Warrican | 6 | 32 | 568 | 1,259 | 7/32 | 10/101 |
| 18.00 | (India) Washington Sundar | 5 | 19 | 342 | 647 | 7/59 | 11/115 |
Qualification: Minimum 500 deliveries bowled Last updated: 14 June 2025

=== Team statistics ===
==== Highest team totals ====
| Score | Team | Overs | Run rate | Innings | Opposition | Venue | Date |
|---|---|---|---|---|---|---|---|
| 823/7d | England | 150 | 5.48 | 1 | Pakistan | Multan Cricket Stadium, Multan, Pakistan | 7 October 2024 |
| 654/6d | Australia | 154 | 4.24 | 1 | Sri Lanka | Galle International Stadium, Galle, Sri Lanka | 29 January 2025 |
| 615 | South Africa | 141.3 | 4.34 | 1 | Pakistan | Newlands Cricket Ground, Cape Town, South Africa | 3 January 2025 |
| 602/5d | Sri Lanka | 163.4 | 3.67 | 1 | New Zealand | Galle International Stadium, Galle, Sri Lanka | 27 September 2024 |
| 592 | England | 107.4 | 5.49 | 1 | Australia | Old Trafford Cricket Ground, Manchester, England | 19 July 2023 |
(d=declared); Last updated: 14 June 2025

==== Lowest team totals ====
| Score | Team | Overs | Run rate | Innings | Opposition | Venue | Date |
|---|---|---|---|---|---|---|---|
| 42 | Sri Lanka | 13.5 | 3.03 | 2 | South Africa | Kingsmead Cricket Ground, Durban, South Africa | 27 November 2024 |
| 46 | India | 31.2 | 1.46 | 1 | New Zealand | M. Chinnaswamy Stadium, Bengaluru, India | 16 October 2024 |
| 55 | South Africa | 23.2 | 2.35 | 1 | India | Newlands Cricket Ground, Cape Town, South Africa | 3 January 2024 |
| 88 | New Zealand | 39.5 | 2.20 | 2 | Sri Lanka | Galle International Stadium, Galle, Sri Lanka | 26 September 2024 |
| 89 | Pakistan | 30.2 | 2.93 | 4 | Australia | Perth Stadium, Perth, Australia | 14 December 2023 |
Last updated: 14 June 2025

== Final standings ==
| Pos. | Team | Prize money (US$) |
|---|---|---|
| 1 | South Africa | 3,600,000 |
| 2 | Australia | 2,160,000 |
| 3 | India | 1,440,000 |
| 4 | New Zealand | 1,200,000 |
| 5 | England | 960,000 |
| 6 | Sri Lanka | 840,000 |
| 7 | Bangladesh | 720,000 |
| 8 | West Indies | 600,000 |
| 9 | Pakistan | 480,000 |
| Total | | 12 million |

Source: ESPNcricinfo
ICC Website:
