= Temba Bavuma =

South African cricketer (born 1990)

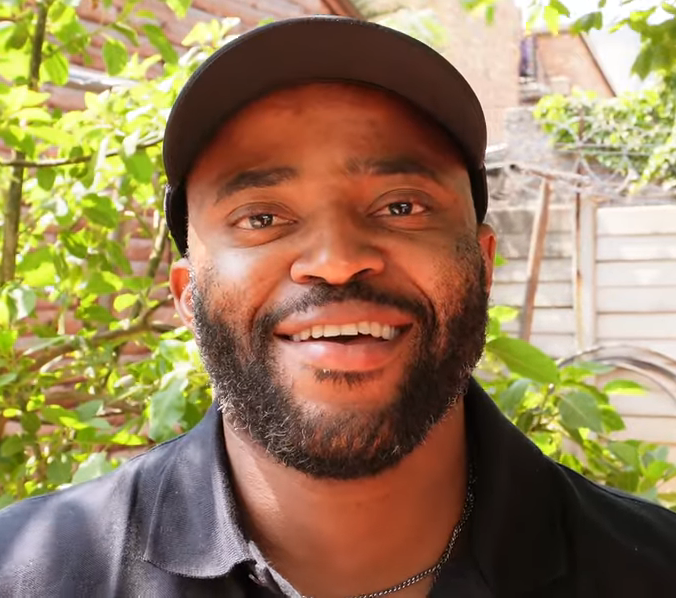
- Bavuma in 2025

Personal information
- Born: 17 May 1990 (age 36); Cape Town, Cape Province, South Africa
- Height: 1.62 m (5 ft 4 in)
- Batting: Right-handed
- Bowling: Right-arm medium
- Role: Middle-order batter

International information
- National side: South Africa (2014–present)
- Test debut (cap 320): 26 December 2014 v West Indies
- Last Test: 22 November 2025 v India
- ODI debut (cap 117): 25 September 2016 v Ireland
- Last ODI: 27 September 2026 v Australia
- T20I debut (cap 83): 18 September 2019 v India
- Last T20I: 3 September 2023 v Australia

Domestic team information
- Years: Team
- 2008/09–present: Gauteng
- 2008/09–2016/17: Lions
- 2017/18: Cape Cobras
- 2018/19–2020/21: Lions
- 2018: Durban Heat (squad no. 11)
- 2019: Northamptonshire (squad no. 9)
- 2019: Jozi Stars
- 2023: Sunrisers Eastern Cape
- 2026: Pretoria Capitals

Career statistics
Competition	Test	ODI	T20I	FC
Matches	70	57	36	184
Runs scored	4,096	2,168	670	10,628
Batting average	39.00	43.36	21.61	38.78
100s/50s	5/27	6/8	0/1	19/58
Top score	179	144	72	180
Balls bowled	96	37	–	500
Wickets	1	0	–	7
Bowling average	61.00	–	–	46.42
5 wickets in innings	0	–	–	0
10 wickets in match	0	–	–	0
Best bowling	1/29	–	–	2/34
Catches/stumpings	34/–	31/–	27/–	102/–
Medal record
Men's cricket
Representing South Africa
ICC World Test Championship
Winner	2023–2025
- Source: ESPNcricinfo, 19 November 2026

Temba Bavuma (born 17 May 1990) is a South African cricketer who has played for the national team since 2014. A right-handed batter, he captains the national team in Test and One Day International (ODI) cricket. In 2016, Bavuma became the first black African cricketer to score a Test century for South Africa, and scored a century on his ODI debut later that same year. He is also the national team's first black African captain, appointed to lead the ODI team in 2021 and the Test team in 2023; under his leadership, South Africa won the 2023–2025 World Test Championship. He had previously served as the Twenty20 International (T20I) captain from 2021 to 2023.

== Early life ==
Bavuma was born in Cape Town, Cape Province, South Africa. He was brought up in the Cape Town suburb of Langa, which is known for its intense cricket culture. Bavuma, alongside fellow cricketers Thami Tsolekile and Malusi Siboto hail from the same street

Bavuma was educated at South African College Junior School in Newlands, and St David's Marist Inanda, a boys high School in Sandton.

== Domestic career ==
Temba Bavuma made his debut in 2008 for Gauteng against Eastern Province. Batting in the middle order, he made four runs in the first innings in which he batted, briefly partnering teammate Dane Vilas to his first-class best score.

He made his franchise debut for the Lions in the 2010/11 season. In the Supersport Series, he made 242 runs in 4 matches at an average of 60.50 in this first season, including a score of 124 not out against the Knights, which earned him a man of the match. In his second Supersport season in 2011/12, he made 637 runs at an average of 53.08. This was enough for him to place 11th in the top run scorers. In 2012/13, he was the 5th highest scorer in the now renamed Sunfoil Series, but at a poorer average of 31.58. In 2013/14, he again scored heavily making 714 runs at an average of 39.66, seeing him place 6th on the Sunfoil Series scorers list. For his franchise, he has an unusually high conversion rate of 50s to 100s, scoring six 100s and five 50s in Supersport and Sunfoil series cricket.

These performances have earned him five matches so far for the South Africa A cricket team. The first was in July 2012 against Sri Lanka A in Durban. He also played a match against Ireland in the A team's tour of the country in August of that year. He did not make a significant contribution in either of those two matches. His next appearances for the A team were in the series of matches played in South Africa between South Africa A and the Indian and Australian A teams. He faced Australia once, and India twice. His best performance was a 65 in the second match of an innings defeat against the Indians. He was included in the Gauteng squad for the 2015 Africa T20 Cup.

In May 2017, Bavuma announced that he was switching franchises to join Cape Cobras ahead of the 2017–18 season. In June 2018, Bavuma was made captain of the Highveld Lions across all formats. In September 2018, he was named in Gauteng's squad for the 2018 Africa T20 Cup. The following month, he was named in Durban Heat's squad for the first edition of the Mzansi Super League T20 tournament. In September 2019, he was named in the squad for the Jozi Stars team for the 2019 Mzansi Super League tournament. In April 2021, he was named in Gauteng's squad, ahead of the 2021–22 cricket season in South Africa.

In September 2022, Bavuma was not picked by any franchise in the auction for the first edition of the SA20 League, but after top-scoring in the ODI series against England was contracted by Sunrisers Eastern Cape to replace Tom Abell during the tournament in February 2023.

== International career ==
=== Early years ===
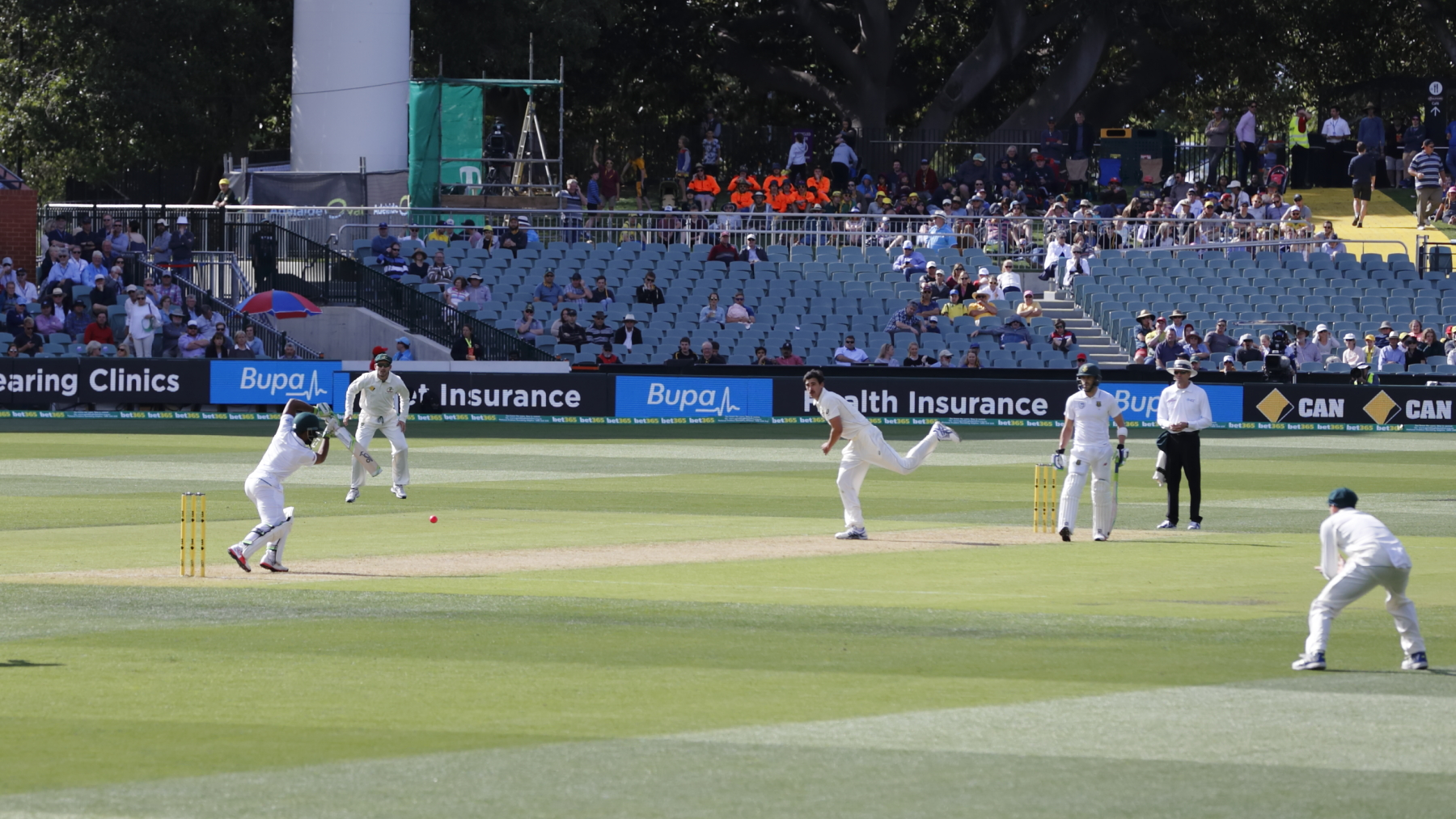
Bavuma batting against Australia in 2016

Bavuma made his Test debut for South Africa against the West Indies on 26 December 2014.

On 5 January 2016, Bavuma became the first black cricketer to score a Test century for South Africa. He scored an unbeaten 102 at the Cape Town in the 2nd Test of the 2015/16 series against England.

Bavuma made his One Day International debut for South Africa against Ireland on 25 September 2016 and scored his maiden ODI century. He opened the batting with Quinton de Kock, standing in for Hashim Amla who was attending the birth of his child. Bavuma was named player of the match for his performance and was the second player to score a century on their ODI debut for South Africa.

Bavuma took his first and only Test wicket against Australia on 7 November 2016.

Bavuma fielding at short leg against England in 2017

In May 2017, Bavuma won the Award of Excellence at Cricket South Africa's annual awards.

In August 2019, Bavuma was named in South Africa's Twenty20 International (T20I) squad for their series against India. He made his T20I debut for South Africa, against India, on 18 September 2019.

=== Captaincy: 2021–present ===
On 4 March 2021, Bavuma was named as the captain of South Africa's limited over team, taking over the captaincy from Quinton de Kock. With the appointment of him as South Africa's permanent captain, he became the first ever black African player to be appointed as the permanent captain of South Africa's team. Bavuma's first series as captain was a home series against Pakistan. He sustained a hamstring injury in the third ODI and as a result missed the T20I portion of the series.

On 24 July 2021, against Ireland in the third T20I, Bavuma scored his maiden T20I half-century, scoring 72 off 51 deliveries before being dismissed by Barry McCarthy. In September, South Africa toured Sri Lanka for three ODIs and three T20Is; in the opening match sustained an injury to his right thumb while batting and retired hurt. The injury required surgery, but Bavuma recovered sufficiently to captain South Africa's squad at the 2021 ICC Men's T20 World Cup in October.

Bavuma became Test captain in 2022. He led his team to the WTC final and won it. To date it remains their second ICC trophy win.

Bavuma batted in 4 games at the 2021 T20 World Cup, scoring 91 runs at an average of 30.33. South Africa initially got off to a bad start, losing to Australia. However they bounced back to win 4 games in a row and beat England, who were the eventual semi finalists. Despite this streak of wins, South Africa would be eliminated in the group stage based on net run rate.

Bavuma scored 46 runs in a win against Sri Lanka and an unbeaten 31 runs in a win against Bangladesh at the tournament.

After the tournament, India toured South Africa for 3 tests and 3 ODIs during December to January. Bavuma was the 4th highest run scorer in the test series, with 221 runs at an average of 73.66 while also hitting two fifties and was instrumental in South Africa winning the series 2–1. Bavuma would replicate his success during the ODI series against India as he scored 153 runs with a top score of 110.

South Africa toured India in June 2022 for five T20Is. South Africa drew the series, but Bavuma sustained an elbow injury in the fourth match and missed South Africa's tour of England later that year. Leading into the 2022 ICC Men's T20 World Cup in October and November, sports journalist Katya Witney writing for Wisden observed that Bavuma was out of form. She suggested that "what Bavuma brings to the team should not be wholly dependent on his batting statistics. His skills and role as captain should not be overlooked lightly." In a second tour of India that year, preceding the T20 World Cup, Bavuma scored eight runs across four innings in T20Is and ODIs, amidst a tour disrupted by illness, with Bavuma missing the final two ODIs.

Bavuma led South Africa at the 2022 ICC Men's T20 World Cup.

On 18 March 2023, in the second ODI against the West Indies, he scored a career-best 144 runs off 118 balls, and crossed the 1000 run-mark in ODIs.

In November 2025, in the first Test of the South African tour of India, Bavuma's unbeaten 55 in the second innings stood out as the only fifty of the match, marking South Africa's first Test victory on Indian soil since 2010. Having won the second and last Test of the series, Bavuma completed a clean sweep of India, handing them their biggest Test defeat (408 runs), South Africa's first series win in India in 25 years as well not having lost a Test as captain after 12 matches.

Bavuma batting in 2026

During the second Test against Australia in October 2026, Bavuma hit 179 runs off 334 balls in South Africa's first innings, making this his highest career score in Test cricket. It was the fourth-highest individual score by a South African captain in a home Test and the second-highest Test score at Gqeberha, behind Herschelle Gibbs' 196 against India in 2001.

=== Captaincy record ===
As of October 2026.

International captaincy record
Format	Mat.	Won	Lost	Tied/Drawn	NR	W%	Period
Test	13	11	1	1	0	84.62	2023–2026
ODI	46	24	21	0	1	52.17	2021–2025
T20I	25	15	9	0	1	62.50	2021–2022

== International centuries ==
Test centuries by Temba Bavuma
No.	Runs	Balls	Innings	Against	Venue	Country	Date	Result
1	102*	148	2	England	Newlands Cricket Ground, Cape Town	South Africa	2 January 2016	Match drawn
2	172	280	3	West Indies	Wanderers Stadium, Johannesburg	South Africa	8 March 2023	South Africa won by 284 runs
3	113	228	3	Sri Lanka	Kingsmead Cricket Ground, Durban	South Africa	27 November 2024	South Africa won by 233 runs
4	106	179	1	Pakistan	Newlands Cricket Ground, Cape Town	South Africa	3 January 2025	South Africa won by 10 wickets
5	179	334	1	Australia	St George's Park, Gqeberha	South Africa	18 October 2026	South Africa won by an innings and 31 runs

ODI centuries by Temba Bavuma
No.	Runs	Balls	Innings	Against	Venue	Country	Date	Result
1	113	123	1	Ireland	Willowmoore Park, Benoni	South Africa	25 September 2016	South Africa won by 206 runs
2	110	143	1	India	Boland Park, Paarl	South Africa	19 January 2022	South Africa won by 31 runs
3	109	102	2	England	Mangaung Oval, Bloemfontein	South Africa	29 January 2023	South Africa won by 5 wickets
4	144	118	2	West Indies	Buffalo Park, East London	South Africa	18 March 2023	West Indies won by 48 runs
5	114*	142	1	Australia	Mangaung Oval, Bloemfontein	South Africa	7 September 2023	Australia won by 3 wickets
6	103	116	1	Australia	Wanderers Stadium, Johannesburg	South Africa	27 September 2026	South Africa won by 32 runs
