= 2016–17 Sunfoil Series =

Cricket tournament

- Dates: 5 October 2016 – 12 February 2017
- Administrator: Cricket South Africa
- Cricket format: First-class
- Tournament format: Double round-robin
- Champions: Knights (3rd title)
- Participants: 6
- Matches: 30
- Most runs: Colin Ackermann (883)
- Most wickets: Duanne Olivier (52)

The 2016–17 Sunfoil Series was a first-class cricket competition that took place in South Africa from 5 October 2016 to 12 February 2017. The competition was split into two halves, with the first group of fixtures played in October and November, and the remaining matches played January and February. The series was played alongside the tournament for provincial teams, the Sunfoil 3-Day Cup. Knights won the tournament with an innings victory in their final match.

== Squads ==
| Cape Cobras | Dolphins | Knights | Lions | Titans | Warriors |
|---|---|---|---|---|---|
| | | Tumelo Bodibe; Patrick Botha; Mbulelo Budaza; Werner Coetsee; Theunis de Bruyn; Marchant de Lange; Corné Dry; Dillon du Preez; Michael Erlank; David Miller; Duanne Olivier; Robin Peterson; Diego Rosier; Rilee Rossouw; Rudi Second; Letlotlo Sesele; Dylan Stanley; Pite van Biljon; Shadley van Schalkwyk | Temba Bavuma; Devon Conway; Stephen Cook; Bjorn Fortuin; Dominic Hendricks; Reeza Hendricks; Sean Jamison; Eddie Leie; Wihan Lubbe; Matt McGillivray; Mangaliso Mosehle; Alviro Petersen; Aaron Phangiso; Nono Pongolo; Dwaine Pretorius; Kagiso Rabada; Nicky van den Bergh; Rassie van der Dussen; Hardus Viljoen | Qaasim Adams; Farhaan Behardien; Junior Dala; Henry Davids; Quinton de Kock; AB de Villiers; Faf du Plessis; Dean Elgar; Heinrich Klaasen; Heino Kuhn; Aiden Markram; Grant Mokoena; Albie Morkel; Morne Morkel; Chris Morris; Lungi Ngidi; Rowan Richards; Tabraiz Shamsi; Malusi Siboto; Daniel Sincuba; Grant Thomson; Jonathan Vandiar; Shaun von Berg; David Wiese | Kyle Abbott; Colin Ackermann; Andrew Birch; Gihahn Cloete; Clyde Fortuin; Ayabulela Gqamane; Simon Harmer; Colin Ingram; Christiaan Jonker; Sisanda Magala; Thandolwethu Mnyaka; Lesiba Ngoepe; Jerry Nqolo; Michael Price; Ngazibini Sigwili; JJ Smuts; Yaseen Vallie; Basheeru-Deen Walters; David White |

== Points table ==
| Teams | Pld | W | L | D | A | Pts | Q |
|---|---|---|---|---|---|---|---|
| Knights | 10 | 4 | 2 | 3 | 1 | 112 | 0.94 |
| Titans | 10 | 4 | 3 | 2 | 1 | 111 | 0.16 |
| Cape Cobras | 10 | 3 | 3 | 4 | 0 | 93 | 0.76 |
| Dolphins | 10 | 2 | 2 | 6 | 0 | 92 | 0.67 |
| Lions | 10 | 3 | 3 | 4 | 0 | 87 | 0.34 |
| Warriors | 10 | 2 | 5 | 0 | 3 | 84 | 0.40 |

== Group stage ==
| Visitor team → | Cape Cobras | Dolphins | Knights | Lions | Titans | Warriors |
| Home team ↓ | Cape Cobras | Dolphins | Knights | Lions | Titans | Warriors |
|---|---|---|---|---|---|---|
| Cape Cobras | | Match drawn | Cobras; 151 Runs | Cobras; 6 Wickets | Titans; Inn & 50 Runs | Match drawn |
| Dolphins | Match drawn | | Match drawn | Match drawn | Titans; 2 Wickets | Match drawn |
| Knights | Knights; 175 Runs | Match drawn | | Match drawn | Abandoned | Knights; 121 Runs |
| Lions | Lions; 10 Wickets | Dolphins; 77 Runs | Knights; Inn & 121 Runs | | Match drawn | Lions; 148 Runs |
| Titans | Cobras; 9 Wickets | Titans; Inn & 38 Runs | Knights; 4 Wickets | Match drawn | | Titans; 4 Wickets |
| Warriors | Match drawn | Dolphins; Inn & 70 Runs | Warriors; 107 Runs | Lions; 14 Runs | Warriors; 6 Wickets | |

| Home team won | Visitor team won | Match drawn | Match abandoned |

Note: Click on the results to see match summary.

== Fixtures ==
=== Round 1 ===
5–8 October
Scorecard

| Dolphins | v | Warriors |
| 478 (138.3 overs); Daryn Smit 121 (289); Basheeru-Deen Walters 4/72 (25.3 overs) | | 230 (91.3 overs); Colin Ackermann 68 (177); Keshav Maharaj 7/89 (33.3 overs) |
| | | 178 (55.5 overs) (f/o); Clyde Fortuin 36 (68); Keshav Maharaj 6/68 (24.5 overs) |

Dolphins won by an innings and 70 runs
Buffalo Park, East London
Umpires: Murray Brown and Johan Cloete
Player of the match: Keshav Maharaj (Dolphins)

- Dolphins won the toss and elected to bat.

5–8 October
Scorecard

| Cape Cobras | v | Lions |
| 102 (35 overs); Zubayr Hamza 29 (31); Willem Mulder 3/10 (7 overs) | | 154 (52.5 overs); Temba Bavuma 76* (119); Jason Smith 4/24 (7 overs) |
| 211 (62.4 overs); Jason Smith 95 (117); Hardus Viljoen 6/75 (20 overs) | | 160/0 (26.5 overs); Stephen Cook 97* (91) |

Lions won by 10 wickets
New Wanderers Stadium, Johannesburg
Umpires: Bongani Jele and Dennis Smith
Player of the match: Hardus Viljoen (Lions)

- Cape Cobras won the toss and elected to bat.
- Willem Mulder (Lions) made his first-class debut.

5–8 October
Scorecard

| Titans | v | Knights |
| 287 (85.2 overs); Heinrich Klaasen 82 (139); Duanne Olivier 6/60 (18.2 overs) | | 174 (58.1 overs); Rudi Second 35* (78); Rowan Richards 3/30 (18 overs) |
| 57 (14.2 overs); Grant Mokoena 18 (15); Marchant de Lange 7/23 (7.2 overs) | | 172/6 (39.4 overs); Theunis de Bruyn 90* (99); Malusi Siboto 3/37 (9 overs) |

Knights won by 4 wickets
Centurion Park, Centurion
Umpires: Lubabalo Gcuma and Clifford Isaacs
Player of the match: Marchant de Lange (Knights)

- Titans won the toss and elected to bat.
- Marchant de Lange (Knights) took his best figures in a first-class match.

=== Round 2 ===
11–14 October
Scorecard

| Dolphins | v | Lions |
| 253 (63.4 overs); Khaya Zondo 55 (80); Sean Jamison 4/56 (13 overs) | | 110 (34.5 overs); Stephen Cook 31 (41); Robbie Frylinck 8/30 (13 overs) |
| 83 (35.3 overs); Khaya Zondo 44 (87); Wiaan Mulder 7/25 (11.3 overs) | | 149 (45.4 overs); Kagiso Rapulana 42 (80); Robbie Frylinck 6/32 (16 overs) |

Dolphins won by 77 runs
Senwes Park, Potchefstroom
Umpires: Lubabalo Gcuma and Stephen Harris

- Dolphins won the toss and elected to bat.
- Robbie Frylinck (Dolphins) set a new South African franchise record for the best bowling figures in a match with 14 for 62.

11–14 October
Scorecard

| Titans | v | Warriors |
| 227 (86.4 overs); Heino Kuhn 52 (75); Simon Harmer 3/31 (22.4 overs) | | 358 (117.5 overs); Colin Ackermann 136 (286); Morne Morkel 3/54 (26 overs) |
| 235 (69.2 overs); Heinrich Klaasen 97* (146); Simon Harmer 4/63 (20 overs) | | 105/4 (35 overs); Edward Moore 58 (102); Shaun von Berg 2/30 (14 overs) |

Warriors won by 6 wickets
St George's Park, Port Elizabeth
Umpires: Murray Brown and Johan Cloete
Player of the match: Colin Ackermann (Warriors)

- Titans won the toss and elected to bat.

11–14 October
Scorecard

| Knights | v | Cape Cobras |
| 342 (79.2 overs); Theunis de Bruyn 64 (86); Tshepo Moreki 3/83 (15.2 overs) | | 241 (78 overs); Stiaan van Zyl 83 (123); Mbulelo Budaza 4/45 (12 overs) |
| 342 (77 overs); Pite van Biljon 123 (182); Omphile Ramela 4/39 (8 overs) | | 268 (59.4 overs); Jason Smith 100* (88); Marchant de Lange 6/61 (18 overs) |

Knights won by 175 runs
Mangaung Oval, Bloemfontein
Umpires: Bongani Jele and Dennis Smith
Player of the match: Pite van Biljon (Knights)

- Knights won the toss and elected to bat.

=== Round 3 ===
20–23 October
Scorecard

| Dolphins | v | Titans |
| 207 (67 overs); Senuran Muthusamy 52* (123); Lungi Ngidi 5/39 (17 overs) | | 432 (109.1 overs); Aiden Markram 162 (218); Robbie Frylinck 2/46 (22 overs) |
| 187 (65.2 overs); Khaya Zondo 68 (101); Rowan Richards 3/37 (16 overs) |

Titans won by an innings and 38 runs
Centurion Park, Centurion
Umpires: Shaun George and Stephen Harris
Player of the match: Aiden Markram (Titans)

- Titans won the toss and elected to field.

20–23 October
Scorecard

| Lions | v | Knights |
| 483 (112.3 overs); Willem Mulder 104 (121); Mbulelo Budaza 3/69 (18 overs) | | 572 (142 overs); David Miller 177 (195); Ayavuya Myoli 4/145 (28 overs) |
| 310/9 (99 overs); Dwaine Pretorius 80 (89); Duanne Olivier 6/93 (31 overs) |

Match drawn
Diamond Oval, Kimberley
Umpires: Johan Cloete and Dennis Smith
Player of the match: David Miller (Knights)

- Lions won the toss and elected to bat.

20–23 October
Scorecard

| Warriors | v | Cape Cobras |
| 525/7d (144 overs); Colin Ackermann 146 (274); Stiaan van Zyl 2/33 (11 overs) | | 567/7 (188 overs); Omphile Ramela 170 (370); Basheeru-Deen Walters 2/79 (30 overs) |

Match drawn
Newlands, Cape Town
Umpires: Marais Erasmus and Bongani Jele
Player of the match: Omphile Ramela (Cape Cobras)

- Warriors won the toss and elected to bat.

=== Round 4 ===
27–30 October
Scorecard

| Dolphins | v | Knights |
| 311 (100.5 overs); Imraan Khan 59 (149); Robin Peterson 6/83 (21 overs) | | 221 (78.3 overs); Rudi Second 76 (167); Senuran Muthusamy 4/57 (16.3 overs) |
| 12/1 (9 overs); Imraan Khan 7 (29); Duanne Olivier 1/8 (5 overs) |

Match drawn
Kingsmead, Durban
Umpires: Stephen Harris and Bongani Jele
Player of the match: Senuran Muthusamy (Dolphins)

- Knights won the toss and elected to field.

27–30 October
Scorecard

| Cape Cobras | v | Titans |
| 235 (74.3 overs); Stiaan van Zyl 65 (140); Shaun von Berg 5/88 (25.3 overs) | | 400 (103 overs); Aiden Markram 139 (200); Rory Kleinveldt 3/76 (18 overs) |
| 115 (40 overs); Stiaan van Zyl 32* (83); Shaun von Berg 5/25 (10 overs) |

Titans won by an innings and 50 runs
Newlands, Cape Town
Umpires: Marais Erasmus and Adrian Holdstock
Player of the match: Shaun von Berg (Titans)

- Titans won the toss and elected to field.

27–30 October
Scorecard

| Lions | v | Warriors |
| 308 (94 overs); Nicky van den Bergh 99 (177); Andrew Birch 4/57 (24 overs) | | 365 (86.5 overs); Lesiba Ngoepe 95 (137); Dwaine Pretorius 6/81 (22.5 overs) |
| 335/8d (106.4 overs); Dominic Hendricks 61 (116); Simon Harmer 4/92 (35.4 overs) | | 139 (34.1 overs); Simon Harmer 42 (42); Hardus Viljoen 5/29 (11.1 overs) |

Lions won by 148 runs
New Wanderers Stadium, Johannesburg
Umpires: Allahudien Paleker and Dennis Smith
Player of the match: Dwaine Pretorius (Lions)

- Lions won the toss and elected to bat.

=== Round 5 ===
3–6 November
Scorecard

| Dolphins | v | Cape Cobras |
| 478 (155.1 overs); Khaya Zondo 157 (254); Dane Paterson 5/79 (32 overs) | | 447 (123.4 overs); Justin Ontong 225 (332); Robbie Frylinck 3/68 (22 overs) |
| 207/4 (62 overs); Daryn Smit 82 (113); Stiaan van Zyl 1/18 (10 overs) |

Match drawn
Boland Park, Paarl
Umpires: Bongani Jele and Brad White
Player of the match: Justin Ontong (Cape Cobras)

- Cape Cobras won the toss and elected to field.

3–6 November
Scorecard

| Warriors | v | Knights |
| 339 (107.4 overs); Colin Ackermann 71 (133); Shadley van Schalkwyk 7/82 (30.4 overs) | | 179 (59.3 overs); Michael Erlank 59 (111); Anrich Nortje 6/44 (19 overs) |
| 236 (58 overs); Lesiba Ngoepe 70 (69); Duanne Olivier 5/66 (20 overs) | | 289 (91.4 overs); Theunis de Bruyn 108 (210); Basheeru-Deen Walters 4/85 (24 overs) |

Warriors won by 107 runs
St George's Park, Port Elizabeth
Umpires: Shaun George and Allahudien Paleker
Player of the match: Anrich Nortje (Warriors)

- Knights won the toss and elected to field.

3–6 November
Scorecard

| Lions | v | Titans |
| 206 (67.3 overs); Dwaine Pretorius 72 (124); Malusi Siboto 7/48 (20.3 overs) | | 431/6d (121.3 overs); Henry Davids 150* (261); Sean Jamison 2/90 (18 overs) |
| 187/2 (56 overs); Rassie van der Dussen 76 (175); Rowan Richards 1/19 (12 overs) |

Match drawn
Senwes Park, Potchefstroom
Umpires: Johan Cloete and Adrian Holdstock
Player of the match: Henry Davids (Titans)

- Lions won the toss and elected to bat.

=== Round 6 ===
5–8 January
Scorecard

| Warriors | v | Dolphins |
| 231 (80.4 overs); Colin Ackermann 81 (156); Senuran Muthusamy 4/49 (14 overs) | | 361/4 (100 overs); Vaughn van Jaarsveld 154 (204); Sisanda Magala 2/70 (20 overs) |

Match drawn
Kingsmead, Durban
Umpires: Adrian Holdstock and Allahudien Paleker
Player of the match: Vaughn van Jaarsveld (Dolphins)

- Dolphins won the toss and elected to field.

5–8 January
Scorecard

| Knights | v | Titans |

Match abandoned
Mangaung Oval, Bloemfontein
Umpires: Lubabalo Gcuma and Clifford Isaacs

- No toss.
- No play was possible due to rain.

5–8 January
Scorecard

| Lions | v | Cape Cobras |
| 126 (63.3 overs); Dwaine Pretorius 35 (71); Wayne Parnell 4/26 (18.3 overs) | | 273 (96.3 overs); Omphile Ramela 75 (148); Willem Mulder 3/44 (16.3 overs) |
| 383 (164 overs); Nicky van den Bergh 93 (252); Jason Smith 2/38 (20 overs) | | 239/4 (43.3 overs); Wayne Parnell 103* (131); Willem Mulder 2/52 (7.3 overs) |

Cape Cobras won by 6 wickets
Recreation Ground, Oudtshoorn
Umpires: Shaun George and Stephen Harris
Player of the match: Wayne Parnell (Cape Cobras)

- Cape Cobras won the toss and elected to field.

=== Round 7 ===
12–15 January
Scorecard

| Cape Cobras | v | Warriors |
| 291 (83.2 overs); Andrew Puttick 85 (186); Basheeru-Deen Walters 3/42 (15.2 overs) | | 260 (79.4 overs); Yaseen Vallie 94 (163); Dane Piedt 4/64 (15.4 overs) |
| 71/3 (23 overs); Justin Ontong 28* (47); Basheeru-Deen Walters 1/10 (6 overs) |

Match drawn
Buffalo Park, East London
Umpires: Shaun George and Dennis Smith
Player of the match: Yaseen Vallie (Warriors)

- Warriors won the toss and elected to field.

12–15 January
Scorecard

| Knights | v | Dolphins |
| 487/7d (105.5 overs); Theunis de Bruyn 182 (249); Mthokozisi Shezi 2/60 (16 overs) | | 538/7d (141 overs); Vaughn van Jaarsveld 203 (237); Rudi Second 4/105 (24 overs) |

Match drawn
Diamond Oval, Kimberley
Umpires: Lubabalo Gcuma and Allahudien Paleker
Player of the match: Vaughn van Jaarsveld (Dolphins)

- Dolphins won the toss and elected to field.
- No play was possible on day 1 due to rain.

12–15 January
Scorecard

| Lions | v | Titans |
| 347 (126.1 overs); Nicky van den Bergh 99 (203); Malusi Siboto 3/51 (25.1 overs) | | 251 (75.1 overs); Chris Morris 39 (80); Bjorn Fortuin 4/56 (22.1 overs) |
| 308/6d (85.4 overs); Dominic Hendricks 103* (219); Chris Morris 3/23 (14.1 overs) | | 143/2 (50 overs); Aiden Markram 53 (124); Dwaine Pretorius 1/20 (13 overs) |

Match drawn
Willowmoore Park, Benoni
Umpires: Bongani Jele and Brad White
Player of the match: Dominic Hendricks (Lions)

- Titans won the toss and elected to field.

=== Round 8 ===
19–22 January
Scorecard

| Dolphins | v | Lions |
| 339 (114.5 overs); Khaya Zondo 141* (290); Dwaine Pretorius 5/54 (26 overs) | | 267 (114.3 overs); Dominic Hendricks 78 (251); Keshav Maharaj 6/86 (48.3 overs) |
| 189/6d (51 overs); Khaya Zondo 54 (139); Beuran Hendricks 3/48 (9 overs) | | 74/1 (31 overs); Rassie van der Dussen 38* (78); Keshav Maharaj 1/18 (11 overs) |

Match drawn
City Oval, Pietermaritzburg
Umpires: Johan Cloete and Brad White
Player of the match: Khaya Zondo (Dolphins)

- Dolphins won the toss and elected to bat.

26–29 January
Scorecard

| Knights | v | Warriors |
| 431 (104.3 overs); Rudi Second 151 (200); Simon Harmer 4/90 (27.3 overs) | | 299 (76.5 overs); Sisanda Magala 79 (105); Duanne Olivier 6/82 (24.5 overs) |
| 189 (59.3 overs); Rudi Second 37 (47); Andrew Birch 3/11 (9.3 overs) | | 200 (55.2 overs); Lesiba Ngoepe 56 (79); Duanne Olivier 5/67 (18 overs) |

Knights won by 121 runs
Mangaung Oval, Bloemfontein
Umpires: Johan Cloete and Brad White
Player of the match: Duanne Olivier (Knights)

- Knights won the toss and elected to bat.

26–29 January
Scorecard

| Titans | v | Cape Cobras |
| 195 (62.3 overs); Heinrich Klaasen 52 (106); Tshepo Moreki 3/37 (12.3 overs) | | 326/9d (97.1 overs); Justin Ontong 110 (206); David Wiese 5/41 (26 overs) |
| 168 (71.3 overs); Heinrich Klaasen 54 (133); Rory Kleinveldt 5/45 (18 overs) | | 41/1 (8.3 overs); Stiaan van Zyl 18* (8); Malusi Siboto 1/14 (1.3 overs) |

Cape Cobras won by 9 wickets
Centurion Park, Centurion
Umpires: Lubabalo Gcuma and Dennis Smith
Player of the match: Justin Ontong (Cape Cobras)

- Titans won the toss and elected to bat.

=== Round 9 ===
2–5 February
Scorecard

| Cape Cobras | v | Knights |
| 154 (52.2 overs); Justin Ontong 38 (53); Shadley van Schalkwyk 4/40 (14 overs) | | 153 (52.2 overs); Shadley van Schalkwyk 34 (58); Dane Paterson 3/39 (13 overs) |
| 330 (97.1 overs); Stiaan van Zyl 106 (192); Shadley van Schalkwyk 3/43 (19.1 overs) | | 180 (57.1 overs); Luthando Mnyanda 57 (101); Dane Piedt 6/87 (25.1 overs) |

Cape Cobras won by 151 runs
Boland Park, Paarl
Umpires: Bongani Jele and Geoff Joshua
Player of the match: Stiaan van Zyl (Cape Cobras)

- Cape Cobras won the toss and elected to bat.

2–5 February
Scorecard

| Lions | v | Warriors |
| 307 (97.3 overs); Rassie van der Dussen 82 (175); Anrich Nortje 4/71 (23 overs) | | 203/6d (75 overs); Somila Seyibokwe 52* (132); Sean Jamison 2/16 (17 overs) |
| 153/2d (39.3 overs); Dominic Hendricks 76* (123); Basheeru-Deen Walters 2/30 (8 overs) | | 243 (68 overs); Lesiba Ngoepe 77 (104); Ayavuya Myoli 3/58 (13 overs) |

Lions won by 14 runs
Buffalo Park, East London
Umpires: Lubabalo Gcuma and Virender Sharma
Player of the match: Rassie van der Dussen (Lions)

- Warriors won the toss and elected to field.

2–5 February
Scorecard

| Dolphins | v | Titans |
| 301 (89.2 overs); Divan van Wyk 76 (106); Malusi Siboto 3/42 (17 overs) | | 403 (136.2 overs); Heinrich Klaasen 195 (353); Rabian Engelbrecht 4/61 (19 overs) |
| 192 (61.3 overs); Daryn Smit 72 (131); Henry Davids 3/29 (12 overs) | | 91/8 (31.4 overs); Heinrich Klaasen 35 (52); Prenelan Subrayen 5/35 (15.4 overs) |

Titans won by 2 wickets
City Oval, Pietermaritzburg
Umpires: Richard Hooper and Allahudien Paleker
Player of the match: Heinrich Klaasen (Titans)

- Dolphins won the toss and elected to bat.

=== Round 10 ===
9–12 February
Scorecard

| Cape Cobras | v | Dolphins |
| 381 (104.2 overs); Andrew Puttick 116 (240); Senuran Muthusamy 5/67 (12 overs) | | 329/8d (106.1 overs); Daryn Smit 150* (264); Lizaad Williams 4/70 (24 overs) |
| 291/7 (128 overs); Stiaan van Zyl 101* (263); Senuran Muthusamy 4/116 (46 overs) |

Match drawn
Kingsmead, Durban
Umpires: Bongani Jele and Virender Sharma
Player of the match: Daryn Smit (Dolphins)

- Cape Cobras won the toss and elected to bat.

9–12 February
Scorecard

| Knights | v | Lions |
| 443 (101.3 overs); Pite van Biljon 119 (164); Beuran Hendricks 5/89 (25.3 overs) | | 87 (36 overs); Reeza Hendricks 35 (84); Marchant de Lange 3/17 (10 overs) |
| | | 235 (70.1 overs) (f/o); Reeza Hendricks 112 (138); Duanne Olivier 4/59 (20 overs) |

Knights won by an innings and 121 runs
New Wanderers Stadium, Johannesburg
Umpires: Geoff Joshua and Allahudien Paleker
Player of the match: Pite van Biljon (Knights)

- Knights won the toss and elected to bat.

9–12 February
Scorecard

| Warriors | v | Titans |
| 187 (74.2 overs); Colin Ingram 49 (74); Shaun von Berg 4/59 (19.2 overs) | | 227 (67 overs); Shaun von Berg 103 (121); Simon Harmer 4/63 (18 overs) |
| 354 (117.4 overs); Colin Ackermann 150 (296); Shaun von Berg 6/144 (42.4 overs) | | 316/6 (91.1 overs); Heino Kuhn 165* (285); Tladi Bokako 2/43 (17.1 overs) |

Titans won by 4 wickets
Willowmoore Park, Benoni
Umpires: Richard Hooper and Dennis Smith
Player of the match: Shaun von Berg (Titans)

- Warriors won the toss and elected to bat.
