= 2017 Ram Slam T20 Challenge =

Cricket tournament

- Dates: 10 November 2017 – 16 December 2017
- Administrator: Cricket South Africa
- Cricket format: Twenty20
- Tournament format(s): Double round-robin and knockout
- Host: South Africa
- Champions: Titans (6th title)
- Participants: 6
- Matches: 33
- Most runs: Reeza Hendricks (361)
- Most wickets: Tabraiz Shamsi (16)

The 2017–18 Ram Slam T20 Challenge was the fifteenth season of the CSA T20 Challenge, established by Cricket South Africa. It started on 10 November 2017 and finished on 16 December 2017. Titans were the defending champions.

The tournament was originally scheduled to be played between 14 March and 15 April 2018. However, after the first season of the T20 Global League was postponed, the tournament was brought forward to November 2017. It was going to be the second consecutive tournament played without a sponsor. However, in November 2017, Cricket South Africa announced it would be branded as the Ram Slam T20 Challenge again.

During the tournament, Dolphins had five of their matches washed out. Despite the rain-affected games, Dolphins finished second in the group-stage and were joined in the semi-finals with Titans, Cape Cobras and Warriors. In the first semi-final, Titans beat Warriors by 8 wickets to advance to the final. The second semi-final between Dolphins and Cape Cobras was washed out with no play possible. There was no reserve day, so Dolphins advanced to the final after they finished above Cape Cobras in the group stage. In the final, Titans beat Dolphins by 7 wickets to win the tournament for a third consecutive time.

== Squads ==
Cape Cobras	Dolphins	Knights	Lions	Titans	Warriors
JP Duminy (c); Ferisco Adams; Qaasim Adams; Hashim Amla; Temba Bavuma; Richard Levi; George Linde; Michael Loubser; Aviwe Mgijima; Sammy Mofokeng; Tshepo Moreki; Mthiwekhaya Nabe; Wayne Parnell; Dane Paterson; Vernon Philander; Dane Piedt; Jason Smith; Kyle Verreynne	Khaya Zondo (c); Eathan Bosch; Cody Chetty; Sarel Erwee; Robert Frylinck; Keshav Maharaj; Sibonelo Makhanya; Attie Maposa; Smangaliso Nhlebela; Andile Phehlukwayo; Mthokozisi Shezi; Prenelan Subrayen; Morné van Wyk; Dane Vilas	Theunis de Bruyn (c); Marchant de Lange; Andries Gous; Patrick Kruger; Eddie Leie; Ryan McLaren; David Miller; Grant Mokoena; Tshepo Ntuli; Duanne Olivier; Keegan Petersen; Aubrey Swanepoel; Shadley van Schalkwyk	Aaron Phangiso (c); Marques Ackerman; Bjorn Fortuin; Beuran Hendricks; Reeza Hendricks; Carmi le Roux; Wihan Lubbe; Janneman Malan; Mangaliso Mosehle; Wiaan Mulder; Dwaine Pretorius; Kagiso Rabada; Omphile Ramela; Ryan Rickelton; Nicky van den Bergh; Rassie van der Dussen; Hardus Viljoen	Albie Morkel (c); Farhaan Behardien; Junior Dala; Henry Davids; Quinton de Kock; AB de Villiers; Dean Elgar; Eldred Hawken; Heinrich Klaasen; Aiden Markram; Lungi Ngidi; Tabraiz Shamsi; Malusi Siboto; David Wiese	JJ Smuts (c); Colin Ackermann; Andrew Birch; Gihahn Cloete; Ayabulela Gqamane; Simon Harmer; Colin Ingram; Christiaan Jonker; Sisanda Magala; Anrich Nortje; Jerry Nqolo; Solo Nqweni; Kelly Smuts; Basheeru-Deen Walters

== Points table ==
Pos	Team	Pld	W	L	T	NR	BP	Pts	NRR
1	Titans	10	6	2	0	2	4	32	1.104
2	Dolphins	10	3	2	0	5	1	23	1.224
3	Cape Cobras	10	5	4	0	1	0	22	−0.395
4	Warriors	10	4	5	0	1	0	18	−0.738
5	Lions	10	2	4	0	4	0	16	−0.389
6	Knights	10	2	5	0	3	0	14	−0.322

- Top four teams advanced to the finals

== Fixtures ==
=== Round-robin ===
10 November 2017
Scorecard

Warriors; 153/9 (20 overs)	v	Knights; 157/2 (18 overs)
Christiaan Jonker 61 (38); Shadley van Schalkwyk 3/25 (4 overs)		Theunis de Bruyn 78* (48); Basheeru-Deen Walters 1/30 (3 overs)

Knights won by 8 wickets
St George's Park, Port Elizabeth
Umpires: Shaun George and Bongani Jele

- Knights won the toss and elected to field.
- Theunis de Bruyn and David Miller set a new partnership record for the third wicket for the Knights in T20s (142).

12 November 2017
Scorecard

Dolphins; 231/2 (20 overs)	v	Cape Cobras; 108/3 (10 overs)
Sarel Erwee 103* (58); Mthiwekhaya Nabe 1/38 (4 overs)		Hashim Amla 52* (27); Robert Frylinck 1/14 (2 overs)

Dolphins won by 15 runs (D/L method)
Centurion Park, Centurion
Umpires: Allahudien Paleker and Dennis Smith

- Cape Cobras won the toss and elected to field
- Eathan Bosch (Dolphins) made his T20 debut.
- Sarel Erwee (Dolphins) scored his first century in a T20 match.
- The Dolphins' total of 231 was the highest by any team in a domestic T20 match in South Africa.

12 November 2017
Scorecard

Lions; 127/6 (15 overs)	v	Titans; 140/2 (11.2 overs)
Reeza Hendricks 67* (42); Albie Morkel 3/12 (3 overs)		AB de Villiers 50* (19); Wiaan Mulder 2/28 (3 overs)

Titans won by 8 wickets (D/L method)
Centurion Park, Centurion
Umpires: Lubabalo Gcuma and Adrian Holdstock

- Lions won the toss and elected to bat.

15 November 2017
Scorecard

Titans; 199/4 (20 overs)	v	Knights; 161/7 (20 overs)
Aiden Markram 50 (34); Shadley van Schalkwyk 1/38 (4 overs); Aubrey Swanepoel 1/38 (4 overs)		Andries Gous 37 (29); Tabraiz Shamsi 2/30 (4 overs)

Titans won by 38 runs
Diamond Oval, Kimberley
Umpires: Phillip Vosloo and Brad White

- Knights won the toss and elected to field.

17 November 2017
Scorecard

Titans; 172/4 (20 overs)	v	Warriors; 111 (14.2 overs)
Aiden Markram 45 (32); Kelly Smuts 1/6 (1 over)		Gihahn Cloete 32 (21); Lungi Ngidi 4/14 (2.2 overs)

Titans won by 61 runs
Buffalo Park, East London
Umpires: Murray Brown and Dennis Smith

- Warriors won the toss and elected to field.

17 November 2017
Scorecard

Knights	v	Dolphins

No result
Kingsmead Cricket Ground, Durban
Umpires: Johan Cloete and Lubabalo Gcuma

- Dolphins won the toss and elected to field.
- No play was possible due to rain.

17 November 2017
Scorecard

Cape Cobras; 169/6 (20 overs)	v	Lions; 175/3 (18.5 overs)
JP Duminy 55 (31); Kagiso Rabada 2/19 (4 overs)		Mangaliso Mosehle 55 (36); Vernon Philander 1/26 (4 overs)

Lions won by 7 wickets
New Wanderers Stadium, Johannesburg
Umpires: Adrian Holdstock and Allahudien Paleker

- Cape Cobras won the toss and elected to bat.

19 November 2017
Scorecard

Dolphins; 168/6 (20 overs)	v	Lions; 170/4 (20 overs)
Sibonelo Makhanya 46* (34); Aaron Phangiso 2/25 (4 overs)		Reeza Hendricks 102* (72); Andile Phehlukwayo 2/26 (4 overs)

Lions won by 6 wickets
Senwes Park, Potchefstroom
Umpires: Johan Cloete and Clifford Isaacs

- Dolphins won the toss and elected to bat.
- Reeza Hendricks (Lions) scored his first century in a T20 match.

19 November 2017
Scorecard

Cape Cobras; 119/9 (20 overs)	v	Titans; 120/3 (13.3 overs)
JP Duminy 40 (43); Dale Steyn 2/16 (4 overs)		Aiden Markram 51* (36); Vernon Philander 2/31 (4 overs)

Titans won by 7 wickets
Centurion Park, Centurion
Umpires: Shaun George and Arno Jacobs

- Titans won the toss and elected to field.

22 November 2017
Scorecard

Dolphins	v	Warriors

Match abandoned
Kingsmead Cricket Ground, Durban
Umpires: Adrian Holdstock

- No toss.
- No play was possible due to rain.

24 November 2017
Scorecard

Cape Cobras; 145/7 (20 overs)	v	Lions; 139/6 (20 overs)
JP Duminy 54 (49); Wiaan Mulder 2/16 (3 overs)		Rassie van der Dussen 51 (44); Rory Kleinveldt 2/16 (3 overs)

Cape Cobras won by 6 runs
Boland Park, Paarl
Umpires: Bongani Jele and Abdoellah Steenkamp

- Lions won the toss and elected to field.

24 November 2017
Scorecard

Warriors; 155/6 (20 overs)	v	Knights; 156/6 (20 overs)
Colin Ackermann 74 (51); Mbulelo Budaza 2/34 (4 overs)		David Miller 48 (37); JJ Smuts 2/33 (4 overs)

Knights won by 4 wickets
Mangaung Oval, Bloemfontein
Umpires: Ryan Hendricks and Brad White

- Knights won the toss and elected to field.

24 November 2017
Scorecard

Dolphins	v	Titans

No result
Willowmoore Park, Benoni
Umpires: Stephen Harris and Allahudien Paleker

- Titans won the toss and elected to field.
- No play was possible due to rain.

26 November 2017
Scorecard

Lions; 182/3 (20 overs)	v	Warriors; 183/6 (20 overs)
Reeza Hendricks 81 (63); Basheeru-Deen Walters 1/33 (3 overs)		Colin Ingram 89 (48); Kagiso Rabada 3/25 (4 overs)

Warriors won by 4 wickets
Newlands Cricket Ground, Cape Town
Umpires: Shaun George and Abdoellah Steenkamp

- Warriors won the toss and elected to field.

26 November 2017
Scorecard

Knights; 159/5 (20 overs)	v	Cape Cobras; 163/7 (19 overs)
David Miller 50 (37); Rory Kleinveldt 3/19 (4 overs)		JP Duminy 67 (44); Ryan McLaren 2/33 (4 overs)

Cape Cobras won by 3 wickets
Newlands Cricket Ground, Cape Town
Umpires: Bongani Jele and Thomas Mokorosi

- Cape Cobras won the toss and elected to field.

29 November 2017
Scorecard

Cape Cobras; 159/4 (20 overs)	v	Warriors; 149/8 (20 overs)
George Linde 52 (30); Andrew Birch 2/27 (4 overs)		Colin Ackermann 55 (41); Dane Paterson 3/25 (4 overs)

Cape Cobras won by 10 runs
Boland Park, Paarl
Umpires: Johan Cloete and Adrian Holdstock

- Cape Cobras won the toss and elected to bat.

29 November 2017
Scorecard

Lions	v	Titans

Match abandoned
New Wanderers Stadium, Johannesburg
Umpires: Clifford Isaacs and Allahudien Paleker

- No toss.
- No play was possible due to rain.

1 December 2017
Scorecard

Cape Cobras; 172/4 (20 overs)	v	Dolphins; 8/1 (2.1 overs)
JP Duminy 85* (44); Imran Tahir 2/31 (4 overs)		Sarel Erwee 6 (6); Dane Paterson 1/1 (1 over)

No result
Kingsmead Cricket Ground, Durban
Umpires: Lubabalo Gcuma and Brad White

- Dolphins won the toss and elected to field.
- Rain prevented any further play.

1 December 2017
Scorecard

Knights; 86/2 (13 overs)	v	Lions
Keegan Petersen 52* (40); Aaron Phangiso 1/13 (3 overs)

No result
Mangaung Oval, Bloemfontein
Umpires: Bongani Jele and Allahudien Paleker

- Lions won the toss and elected to field.
- Rain prevented any further play.

1 December 2017
Scorecard

Titans; 172/3 (13 overs)	v	Warriors; 116/9 (13 overs)
AB de Villiers 48 (19); Solo Nqweni 1/7 (1 over)		JJ Smuts 53 (30); Tabraiz Shamsi 3/22 (3 overs)

Titans won by 56 runs (D/L method)
Willowmoore Park, Benoni
Umpires: Murray Brown and Johan Cloete

- Warriors won the toss and elected to field.

3 December 2017
Scorecard

Knights; 133/7 (20 overs)	v	Titans; 139/5 (19.5 overs)
David Miller 43 (34); Dale Steyn 2/20 (4 overs)		Farhaan Behardien 56* (39); Aubrey Swanepoel 2/20 (3 overs)

Titans won by 5 wickets
St George's Park, Port Elizabeth
Umpires: Stephen Harris and Arno Jacobs

- Knights won the toss and elected to bat.

3 December 2017
Scorecard

Warriors; 153/8 (20 overs)	v	Dolphins; 152/7 (20 overs)
Christiaan Jonker 59 (36); Robert Frylinck 3/15 (4 overs)		Morne van Wyk 57 (44); Andrew Birch 2/28 (4 overs)

Warriors won by 1 run
St George's Park, Port Elizabeth
Umpires: Siphelele Gasa and Shaun George

- Warriors won the toss and elected to bat.
- Robert Frylinck (Dolphins) took a hat-trick.

6 December 2017
Scorecard

Dolphins	v	Lions

Match abandoned
Kingsmead Cricket Ground, Durban
Umpires: Bongani Jele and Thomas Mokorosi

- No toss.
- No play was possible due to rain.

6 December 2017
Scorecard

Cape Cobras; 156/9 (20 overs)	v	Knights; 151/9 (20 overs)
Temba Bavuma 46 (39); Mbulelo Budaza 4/32 (4 overs)		David Miller 59 (32); Dane Paterson 4/24 (4 overs)

Cape Cobras won by 5 runs
Diamond Oval, Kimberley
Umpires: Adrian Holdstock and Phillip Vosloo

- Knights won the toss and elected to field.

8 December 2017
Scorecard

Knights; 168/4 (17 overs)	v	Dolphins; 169/4 (16.3 overs)
Ryan McLaren 48* (24); Imran Tahir 2/23 (4 overs)		Morne van Wyk 70* (43); Mbulelo Budaza 1/25 (3 overs)

Dolphins won by 6 wickets
Mangaung Oval, Bloemfontein
Umpires: Ryan Hendricks and Adrian Holdstock

- Dolphins won the toss and elected to field.
- Rain reduced the match to 17 overs per side.

8 December 2017
Scorecard

Warriors; 133/4 (17.1 overs)	v	Lions; 92/7 (10 overs)
JJ Smuts 69* (52); Bjorn Fortuin 2/22 (3 overs)		Reeza Hendricks 41* (28); Sisanda Magala 2/19 (2 overs)

Warriors won by 4 runs D/L method)
Senwes Park, Potchefstroom
Umpires: Bongani Jele and Brad White

- Warriors won the toss and elected to bat.

8 December 2017
Scorecard

Titans; 132/9 (20 overs)	v	Cape Cobras; 133/7 (19.5 overs)
Farhaan Behardien 43 (30); Dane Paterson 3/28 (4 overs)		Temba Bavuma 29 (28); Junior Dala 2/15 (3 overs)

Cape Cobras won by 3 wickets
Newlands Cricket Ground, Cape Town
Umpires: Shaun George and Allahudien Paleker

- Cape Cobras won the toss and elected to field.

10 December 2017
Scorecard

Warriors; 168/5 (20 overs)	v	Cape Cobras; 150/6 (20 overs)
JJ Smuts 48 (30); George Linde 2/39 (4 overs)		Hashim Amla 39 (31); Colin Ingram 2/18 (3 overs)

Warriors won by 18 runs
Buffalo Park, East London
Umpires: Stephen Harris and Dennis Smith

- Cape Cobras won the toss and elected to field.

10 December 2017
Scorecard

Dolphins; 168/7 (20 overs)	v	Titans; 79 (19.4 overs)
Morne van Wyk 67 (41); Junior Dala 2/23 (3 overs)		Tabraiz Shamsi 15* (20); Prenelan Subrayen 2/17 (4 overs)

Dolphins won by 89 runs
Kingsmead Cricket Ground, Durban
Umpires: Shaun George and Allahudien Paleker

- Dolphins won the toss and elected to bat.
- This was the biggest win for the Dolphins in the Ram Slam tournament.

10 December 2017
Scorecard

Lions; 3/0 (1 over)	v	Knights
Rassie van der Dussen 2* (4)

No result
Willowmoore Park, Benoni
Umpires: Bongani Jele and Brad White

- Knights won the toss and elected to field.
- Rain prevented any further play.

== Finals ==
1st Semi Final
13 December 2017
Scorecard

Warriors; 143 (18.1 overs)	v	Titans; 145/2 (15.2 overs)
Colin Ackermann 48 (31); Tabraiz Shamsi 4/32 (4 overs)		Aiden Markram 56* (38); Wayne Parnell 1/17 (2 overs)

Titans won by 8 wickets
Centurion Park, Centurion
Umpires: Adrian Holdstock and Bongani Jele

- Titans won the toss and elected to field.

2nd Semi Final
14 December 2017
Scorecard

Dolphins	v	Cape Cobras

Match abandoned
Kingsmead Cricket Ground, Durban
Umpires: Shaun George and Allahudien Paleker

- No toss.
- No play was possible due to rain.
- Dolphins advanced to the final after finishing above Cape Cobras in the group stage.

Final
16 December 2017
Scorecard

Dolphins; 100 (18.3 overs)	v	Titans; 101/3 (11.1 overs)
Andile Phehlukwayo 21 (18); Chris Morris 4/13 (3.3 overs)		Quinton de Kock 39 (27); Khaya Zondo 1/10 (1 over)

Titans won by 7 wickets
Centurion Park, Centurion
Umpires: Shaun George and Bongani Jele

- Titans won the toss and elected to field.
