= South Africa at the Men's T20 World Cup =

South Africa national team performance at T20 World Cup

The South Africa national cricket team is one of the full members of the International Cricket Council (ICC), the governing body of cricket. South Africa played their first ever T20I match against New Zealand, they also hosted the inaugural T20 World Cup (then called World Twenty20) in 2007. There have been nine editions of the T20 World Cup and the team has participated in every edition.

They are yet to win a title although they came close after reaching the final in 2024, but ended up being runners-up after losing to India national cricket team., South Africa have also been semi-finalists in two editions (2009, 2014). They have an overall win–loss record of 32–16 from 49 matches.

Five different captains have led the team across nine editions of tournament, with Graeme Smith having led the team in the first three editions. Faf du Plessis and Temba Bavuma have captained South Africa in two editions while Aiden Markram and AB de Villiers have been skippers for one edition each.

AB de Villers is the leading run scorer for South Africa with 717 runs in 30 matches, while Anrich Nortje is the highest wicket taker for the team with 35 wickets in 19 matches.

== T20 World Cup record ==
Key
| Champions |
| Runners-up |
| Semi-finals |
| Host |

| Year | Round | Position | GP | W | L | T+W | T+L | NR | Ab (Note: Abandoned matches are not counted in the official records.) | Captain |
|---|---|---|---|---|---|---|---|---|---|---|
| (South Africa) 2007 | Super 8 | 5/12 | 5 | 4 | 1 | 0 | 0 | 0 | 0 | Graeme Smith |
| (England) 2009 | Semi-final | 3/12 | 6 | 5 | 1 | 0 | 0 | 0 | 0 | Graeme Smith |
| (Cricket West Indies) 2010 | Super 8 | 6/12 | 5 | 2 | 3 | 0 | 0 | 0 | 0 | Graeme Smith |
| (Sri Lanka) 2012 | Super 8 | 8/12 | 5 | 2 | 3 | 0 | 2 | 0 | 0 | AB de Villiers |
| (Bangladesh) 2014 | Semi-final | 4/16 | 5 | 3 | 2 | 0 | 0 | 0 | 0 | Faf du Plessis |
| (India) 2016 | Super 10 | 5/16 | 4 | 2 | 2 | 0 | 0 | 0 | 0 | Faf du Plessis |
| (United Arab Emirates) (Oman) 2021 | Super 12 | 5/16 | 5 | 4 | 1 | 0 | 0 | 0 | 0 | Temba Bavuma |
| (Australia) 2022 | Super 12 | 6/16 | 5 | 2 | 2 | 0 | 0 | 1 | 0 | Temba Bavuma |
| (Cricket West Indies) (United States) 2024 | Runners-up | 2/20 | 9 | 8 | 1 | 0 | 0 | 0 | 0 | Aiden Markram |
| (India) (Sri Lanka) 2026 | Semi-final | 3/20 | 8 | 6 | 1 | 1 | 0 | 0 | 0 | Aiden Markram |
| Total | 0 titles | 10/10 | 57 | 38 | 17 | 1 | 0 | 1 | 0 | —N/a |

=== Record by opponents ===
| Opponent | M | W | L | T+W | T+L | NR | Ab | Win % | First played |
|---|---|---|---|---|---|---|---|---|---|
| Afghanistan | 4 | 3 | 0 | 1 | 0 | 0 | 0 | 100 | 2010 |
| Australia | 2 | 0 | 2 | 0 | 0 | 0 | 0 | 0.00 | 2012 |
| Bangladesh | 4 | 4 | 0 | 0 | 0 | 0 | 0 | 100 | 2007 |
| Canada | 1 | 1 | 0 | 0 | 0 | 0 | 0 | 100 | 2026 |
| England | 7 | 5 | 2 | 0 | 0 | 0 | 0 | 71.43 | 2007 |
| India | 8 | 3 | 5 | 0 | 0 | 0 | 0 | 37.50 | 2007 |
| Nepal | 1 | 1 | 0 | 0 | 0 | 0 | 0 | 100 | 2024 |
| Netherlands | 3 | 2 | 1 | 0 | 0 | 0 | 0 | 66.67 | 2014 |
| New Zealand | 6 | 5 | 1 | 0 | 0 | 0 | 0 | 83.33 | 2007 |
| Pakistan | 4 | 0 | 4 | 0 | 0 | 0 | 0 | 0.00 | 2009 |
| Scotland | 1 | 1 | 0 | 0 | 0 | 0 | 0 | 100 | 2009 |
| Sri Lanka | 5 | 4 | 1 | 0 | 0 | 0 | 0 | 80.00 | 2012 |
| United Arab Emirates | 1 | 1 | 0 | 0 | 0 | 0 | 0 | 100 | 2026 |
| United States | 1 | 1 | 0 | 0 | 0 | 0 | 0 | 100 | 2024 |
| West Indies | 6 | 5 | 1 | 0 | 0 | 0 | 0 | 83.33 | 2007 |
| Zimbabwe | 3 | 2 | 0 | 0 | 0 | 1 | 0 | 66.67 | 2012 |
| Total | 57 | 38 | 17 | 1 | 0 | 1 | 0 | 66.67 | - |
Source: Last Updated: 05 March 2026

== Tournament results ==
=== South Africa 2007 ===
Squad

- Graeme Smith (c)
- Mark Boucher (wk)
- AB de Villiers (wk)
- Shaun Pollock
- Makhaya Ntini
- Andre Nel
- Thandi Tshabalala
- Morne Morkel
- Albie Morkel
- Justin Kemp
- Johan van der Wath
- Vernon Philander
- Herschelle Gibbs
- JP Duminy
- Gulam Bodi

Results

| Group stage (Group A) | | | Super 8s (Group E) | | | | Semifinal | Final | Overall Result |
| Opposition Result | Opposition Result | Rank | Opposition Result | Opposition Result | Opposition Result | Rank | Opposition Result | Opposition Result | Overall Result |
|---|---|---|---|---|---|---|---|---|---|
| West Indies; W by 8 wickets | Bangladesh; W by 7 wickets | 1 | England; W by 19 runs | New Zealand; W by 6 wickets | India; L by 37 runs | 3 | Did not advance | | Super 8s |
Source: ESPNcricinfo

Scorecards

Group stage (Group A)

11 September
18:00
(scorecard)

| West Indies; 205/6 (20 overs) | v | South Africa; 208/2 (17.4 overs) |
| Chris Gayle 117 (57); Johan van der Wath 2/33 (4 overs) | | Herschelle Gibbs 90 (55); Fidel Edwards 1/21 (3 overs) |

South Africa won by 8 wickets
Wanderers Stadium, Johannesburg
Umpires: Mark Benson (Eng) and Daryl Harper (Aus)
Player of the match: Chris Gayle (WI)

- South Africa won the toss and elected to field.

15 September
18:00
(scorecard)

| Bangladesh; 144 (19.3 overs) | v | South Africa; 146/3 (18.5 overs) |
| Aftab Ahmed 36 (14); Shaun Pollock 3/40 (3.3 overs) | | Albie Morkel 41 (29); Abdur Razzak 2/26 (4 overs) |

South Africa won by 7 wickets
Newlands Cricket Ground, Cape Town
Umpires: Asad Rauf (Pak) and Tony Hill (NZ)
Player of the match: Morne Morkel (SA)

- South Africa won the toss and elected to field.

Super 8 (Group E)

16 September
18:00
(scorecard)

| South Africa; 154/8 (20 overs) | v | England; 135/7 (20 overs) |
| Albie Morkel 43 (20); Stuart Broad 3/37 (4 overs) | | Owais Shah 36 (31); Albie Morkel 2/12 (2 overs) |

South Africa won by 19 runs
Newlands Cricket Ground, Cape Town
Umpires: Asad Rauf (Pak) and Tony Hill (NZ)
Player of the match: Albie Morkel (SA)

- England won the toss and elected to field.

19 September
14:00
(scorecard)

| New Zealand; 153/8 (20 overs) | v | South Africa; 158/4 (19.1 overs) |
| Craig McMillan 48 (25); Morné Morkel 4/16 (4 overs) | | Justin Kemp 89* (56); Mark Gillespie 2/11 (3.1 overs) |

South Africa won by 6 wickets
Kingsmead, Durban
Umpires: Billy Doctrove (WI) and Simon Taufel (Aus)
Player of the match: Justin Kemp (SA)

- South Africa won the toss and elected to field.

20 September
18:00
(scorecard)

| India; 153/5 (20 overs) | v | South Africa; 116/9 (20 overs) |
| Rohit Sharma 50 (40); Shaun Pollock 2/17 (4 overs) | | Albie Morkel 36 (37); R. P. Singh 4/13 (4 overs) |

India won by 37 runs
Kingsmead, Durban
Umpires: Billy Doctrove (WI) and Simon Taufel (Aus)
Player of the match: Rohit Sharma (Ind)

- India won the toss and elected to bat.

=== England 2009 ===
Squad

- Graeme Smith (c)
- Mark Boucher (wk)
- AB de Villiers (wk)
- Herschelle Gibbs
- Johan Botha
- JP Duminy
- Jacques Kallis
- Albie Morkel
- Justin Ontong
- Roelof van der Merwe
- Yusuf Abdulla
- Morne Morkel
- Wayne Parnell
- Robin Peterson
- Dale Steyn

Results

| Group stage (Group D) | | | Super 8s (Group E) | | | | Semifinal | Final | Overall Result |
| Opposition Result | Opposition Result | Rank | Opposition Result | Opposition Result | Opposition Result | Rank | Opposition Result | Opposition Result | Overall Result |
|---|---|---|---|---|---|---|---|---|---|
| Scotland; W by 130 runs | New Zealand; W by 1 run | 1 | England; W by 7 wickets | West Indies; W by 20 runs | India; W by 12 runs | 1 | Pakistan; L by 7 runs | Did not advance | Semi finals |
Source: ESPNcricinfo

Scorecards

Group stage (Group D)

7 June 2009
13:30
Scorecard

| South Africa; 211/5 (20 overs) | v | Scotland; 81 (15.3 overs) |
| AB de Villiers 79* (34); Majid Haq 2/25 (4 overs) | | Kyle Coetzer 42 (32); Albie Morkel 2/15 (1.4 overs) |

South Africa won by 130 runs
The Oval, London
Umpires: Asad Rauf (Pak) and Amiesh Saheba (Ind)
Player of the match: AB de Villiers (SA)

- Scotland won the toss and elected to field.
- South Africa advanced to the Super 8 stage as a result.

9 June 2009
17:30 (D/N)
Scorecard

| South Africa; 128/7 (20 overs) | v | New Zealand; 127/5 (20 overs) |
| Graeme Smith 33 (35); Ian Butler 2/13 (4 overs) | | Brendon McCullum 57 (54); Roelof van der Merwe 2/14 (4 overs) |

South Africa won by 1 run
Lord's, London
Umpires: Asad Rauf (Pak) and Daryl Harper (Aus)
Player of the match: Roelof van der Merwe (SA)

- New Zealand won the toss and elected to field.

Super 8 (Group E)

11 June 2009
17:30 (D/N)
Scorecard

| England; 111 (19.5 overs) | v | South Africa; 114/3 (18.2 overs) |
| Owais Shah 38 (33); Wayne Parnell 3/14 (3.5 overs) | | Jacques Kallis 57 (49); Stuart Broad 1/14 (3 overs) |

South Africa won by 7 wickets
Trent Bridge, Nottingham
Umpires: Steve Davis (Aus) and Tony Hill (NZ)
Player of the match: Jacques Kallis (SA)

- England won the toss and elected to bat.

13 June 2009
13:30
Scorecard

| South Africa; 183/7 (20 overs) | v | West Indies; 163/9 (20 overs) |
| Herschelle Gibbs 55 (35); Jerome Taylor 3/30 (4 overs) | | Lendl Simmons 77 (50); Wayne Parnell 4/14 (4 overs) |

South Africa won by 20 runs
The Oval, London
Umpires: Aleem Dar (Pak) and Mark Benson (Eng)
Player of the match: Wayne Parnell (SA)

- West Indies won the toss and elected to field.

16 June 2009
17:30 (D/N)
Scorecard

| South Africa; 130/5 (20 overs) | v | India; 118/8 (20 overs) |
| AB de Villiers 63 (51); Suresh Raina 1/6 (1 over) | | Rohit Sharma 29 (28); Johan Botha 3/16 (4 overs) |

South Africa won by 12 runs
Trent Bridge, Nottingham
Umpires: Billy Bowden (NZ) and Ian Gould (Eng)
Player of the match: AB de Villiers (SA)

- South Africa won the toss and elected to bat.

Knockout stage

Semi-final 1
18 June 2009
17:30 (D/N)
Scorecard

| Pakistan; 149/4 (20 overs) | v | South Africa; 142/5 (20 overs) |
| Shahid Afridi 51 (34); JP Duminy 1/14 (2 overs) | | Jacques Kallis 64 (54); Shahid Afridi 2/16 (4 overs) |

Pakistan won by 7 runs
Trent Bridge, Nottingham
Umpires: Billy Bowden (NZ) and Steve Davis (Aus)
Player of the match: Shahid Afridi (Pak)

- Pakistan won the toss and elected to bat.

=== West Indies 2010 ===
Squad

- Graeme Smith (c)
- Jacques Kallis
- Loots Bosman
- Johan Botha
- Mark Boucher (wk)
- AB de Villiers (wk)
- JP Duminy
- Herschelle Gibbs
- Charl Langeveldt
- Rory Kleinveldt
- Albie Morkel
- Morne Morkel
- Dale Steyn
- Rusty Theron
- Roelof van der Merwe

Results

| Group stage (Group C) | | | Super 8s (Group E) | | | | Semifinal | Final | Overall Result |
| Opposition Result | Opposition Result | Rank | Opposition Result | Opposition Result | Opposition Result | Rank | Opposition Result | Opposition Result | Overall Result |
|---|---|---|---|---|---|---|---|---|---|
| India; L by 14 runs | Afghanistan; W by 59 runs | 2 | New Zealand; W by 13 runs | England; L by 39 runs | Pakistan; L by 11 runs | 4 | Did not advance | | Super 8s |
Source: ESPNcricinfo

Scorecards

Group stage (Group C)

2 May
09:30
Scorecard

| India; 186/5 (20 overs) | v | South Africa; 172/5 (20 overs) |
| Suresh Raina 101 (60); Rory Kleinveldt 2/48 (4 overs) | | Jacques Kallis 73 (54); Yusuf Pathan 2/42 (4 overs) |

India won by 14 runs
Beausejour Stadium, Gros Islet
Umpires: Aleem Dar (Pak) and Simon Taufel (Aus)
Player of the match: Suresh Raina (Ind)

- South Africa won the toss and elected to field.

5 May
17:00 (D/N)
Scorecard

| South Africa; 139/7 (20 overs) | v | Afghanistan; 80 (16 overs) |
| Jacques Kallis 34 (33); Hamid Hassan 3/21 (4 overs) | | Mirwais Ashraf 23 (25); Morné Morkel 4/20 (3 overs) |

South Africa won by 59 runs
Kensington Oval, Bridgetown
Umpires: Ian Gould (Eng) and Simon Taufel (Aus)
Player of the match: Morné Morkel (SA)

- Afghanistan won the toss and elected to field.
- South Africa qualified for the Super 8s as a result of this match.

Super 8 (Group E)

6 May
13:30
Scorecard

| South Africa; 170/4 (20 overs) | v | New Zealand; 157/7 (20 overs) |
| AB de Villiers 47* (39); Jacob Oram 1/22 (3 overs) | | Jesse Ryder 33 (28); Johan Botha 2/23 (3 overs) |

South Africa won by 13 runs
Kensington Oval, Bridgetown
Umpires: Aleem Dar (Pak) and Steve Davis (Aus)
Player of the match: Albie Morkel (SA)

- South Africa won the toss and elected to bat.

8 May
13:30
Scorecard

| England; 168/7 (20 overs) | v | South Africa; 129 (19 overs) |
| Kevin Pietersen 53 (33); Johan Botha 2/15 (4 overs) | | JP Duminy 39 (25); Ryan Sidebottom 3/23 (4 overs) |

England won by 39 runs
Kensington Oval, Bridgetown
Umpires: Aleem Dar (Pak) and Steve Davis (Aus)
Player of the match: Kevin Pietersen (Eng)

- England won the toss and elected to bat.

10 May
09:30
Scorecard

| Pakistan; 148/7 (20 overs) | v | South Africa; 137/7 (20 overs) |
| Umar Akmal 51 (33); Charl Langeveldt 4/19 (4 overs) | | AB de Villiers 53 (41); Saeed Ajmal 4/26 (4 overs) |

Pakistan won by 11 runs
Beausejour Stadium, Gros Islet
Umpires: Billy Doctrove (WI) and Ian Gould (Eng)
Player of the match: Umar Akmal (Pak)

- Pakistan won the toss and elected to bat.

=== Sri Lanka 2012 ===
Squad

- AB de Villiers (c, wk)
- Hashim Amla (vc)
- Faf du Plessis
- Richard Levi
- JP Duminy
- Jacques Kallis
- Albie Morkel
- Justin Ontong
- Farhaan Behardien
- Johan Botha
- Morne Morkel
- Wayne Parnell
- Robin Peterson
- Dale Steyn
- Lonwabo Tsotsobe

Results

| Group stage (Group C) | | | Super 8s (Group F) | | | | Semifinal | Final | Overall Result |
| Opposition Result | Opposition Result | Rank | Opposition Result | Opposition Result | Opposition Result | Rank | Opposition Result | Opposition Result | Overall Result |
|---|---|---|---|---|---|---|---|---|---|
| Zimbabwe; W by 10 wickets | Sri Lanka; W by 32 runs | 2 | Pakistan; Lby 2 wickets | Australia; L by 8 wickets | India; L by 1 run | 4 | Did not advance | | Super 8s |
Source: ESPNcricinfo

Scorecards

Group stage (Group C)

20 September
19:30 (D/N)
Scorecard

| Zimbabwe; 93/8 (20 overs) | v | South Africa; 94/0 (12.4 overs) |
| Craig Ervine 37 (40); Jacques Kallis 4/15 (4 overs) | | Richard Levi 50* (43) |

South Africa won by 10 wickets
Mahinda Rajapaksa International Cricket Stadium, Sooriyawewa
Umpires: Steve Davis (Aus) and Richard Kettleborough (Eng)
Player of the match: Jacques Kallis (SA)

- South Africa won the toss and elected to field
- South Africa qualified for Super 8 as a result of this match

22 September
15:30 (D/N)
Scorecard

| South Africa; 78/4 (7 overs) | v | Sri Lanka; 46/5 (7 overs) |
| AB de Villiers 30 (13); Nuwan Kulasekara 1/9 (1 over) | | Kumar Sangakkara 13 (11); Dale Steyn 2/10 (2 overs) |

South Africa won by 32 runs
Mahinda Rajapaksa International Cricket Stadium, Sooriyawewa
Umpires: Richard Kettleborough (Eng) and Rod Tucker (Aus)
Player of the match: AB de Villiers (SA)

- Sri Lanka won the toss and elected to field
- The match was reduced to 7 overs per side due to rain.

Super 8 (Group F)

28 September
15:30 (D/N)
Scorecard

| South Africa; 133/6 (20 overs) | v | Pakistan; 136/8 (19.4 overs) |
| JP Duminy 48 (38); Mohammad Hafeez 2/23 (4 overs) | | Umar Akmal 43* (41); Dale Steyn 3/22 (4 overs) |

Pakistan won by 2 wickets
R. Premadasa Stadium, Colombo
Umpires: Ian Gould (Eng) and Rod Tucker (Aus)
Player of the match: Umar Gul (Pak)

- South Africa won the toss and elected to bat

30 September
15:30 (D/N)
Scorecard

| South Africa; 146/5 (20 overs) | v | Australia; 147/2 (17.4 overs) |
| Robin Peterson 32* (19); Xavier Doherty 3/20 (4 overs) | | Shane Watson 70 (47); Morne Morkel 1/23 (3 overs) |

Australia won by 8 wickets
R. Premadasa Stadium, Colombo
Umpires: Kumar Dharmasena (SL) and Ian Gould (Eng)
Player of the match: Shane Watson (Aus)

- Australia won the toss and elected to field

2 October
19:30 (D/N)
Scorecard

| India; 152/6 (20 overs) | v | South Africa; 151 (19.5 overs) |
| Suresh Raina 45 (34); Robin Peterson 2/25 (4 overs) | | Faf du Plessis 65 (38); Zaheer Khan 3/22 (4 overs) |

India won by 1 run
R. Premadasa Stadium, Colombo
Umpires: Kumar Dharmasena (SL) and Rod Tucker (Aus)
Player of the match: Yuvraj Singh (Ind)

- South Africa won the toss and elected to field

=== Bangladesh 2014 ===
Squad

- Faf du Plessis (c)
- Hashim Amla
- AB de Villiers (wk)
- Quinton de Kock (wk)
- David Miller
- JP Duminy
- Albie Morkel
- Farhaan Behardien
- Imran Tahir
- Wayne Parnell
- Dale Steyn
- Lonwabo Tsotsobe
- Aaron Phangiso
- Morne Morkel
- Beuran Hendricks

Results

| Super 10 (Group 1) | | | | | Semifinal | Final | Overall Result |
| Opposition Result | Opposition Result | Opposition Result | Opposition Result | Rank | Opposition Result | Opposition Result | Overall Result |
|---|---|---|---|---|---|---|---|
| Sri Lanka; L by 5 runs | New Zealand; W by 2 runs | Netherlands; W by 6 runs | England; W by 3 runs | 2 | India; L by 6 wickets | Did not advance | Semi finals |
Source: ESPNcricinfo

Scorecards

Super 10 (Group 1)

22 March 2014
15:30
Scorecard

| Sri Lanka; 165/7 (20 overs) | v | South Africa; 160/8 (20 overs) |
| Kusal Perera 61 (40); Imran Tahir 3/26 (4 overs) | | JP Duminy 39 (30); Sachithra Senanayake 2/22 (4 overs) |

Sri Lanka won by 5 runs
Zohur Ahmed Chowdhury Stadium, Chittagong
Umpires: S. Ravi (Ind) and Rod Tucker (Aus)
Player of the match: Kusal Perera (SL)

- Sri Lanka won the toss and elected to bat

24 March 2014
15:30
Scorecard

| South Africa; 170/6 (20 overs) | v | New Zealand; 168/8 (20 overs) |
| JP Duminy 86* (43); Corey Anderson 2/28 (3 overs) | | Ross Taylor 62 (37); Dale Steyn 4/17 (4 overs) |

South Africa won by 2 runs
Zohur Ahmed Chowdhury Stadium, Chittagong
Umpires: Aleem Dar (Pak) and S. Ravi (Ind)
Player of the match: JP Duminy (SA)

- New Zealand won the toss and elected to field

27 March 2014
15:30
Scorecard

| South Africa; 145/9 (20 overs) | v | Netherlands; 139 (18.4 overs) |
| Hashim Amla 43 (22); Ahsan Malik 5/19 (4 overs) | | Stephan Myburgh 51 (28); Imran Tahir 4/21 (4 overs) |

South Africa won by 6 runs
Zohur Ahmed Chowdhury Stadium, Chittagong
Umpires: Steve Davis (Aus) and Bruce Oxenford (Aus)
Player of the match: Imran Tahir (SA)

- Netherlands won the toss and elected to field

29 March 2014
19:30 (D/N)
Scorecard

| South Africa; 196/5 (20 overs) | v | England; 193/7 (20 overs) |
| AB de Villiers 69* (28); James Tredwell 1/25 (3 overs) | | Alex Hales 38 (22); Wayne Parnell 3/31 (4 overs) |

South Africa won by 3 runs
Zohur Ahmed Chowdhury Stadium, Chittagong
Umpires: Steve Davis (Aus) and Rod Tucker (Aus)
Player of the match: AB de Villiers (SA)

- England won the toss and elected to field
- AB de Villiers scored the fastest T20I fifty for South Africa.
- With this result South Africa qualified for the Semi-finals.

Knockout stage

4 April
19:00 (D/N)
Scorecard

| South Africa; 172/4 (20 overs) | v | India; 176/4 (19.1 overs) |
| Faf du Plessis 58 (41); Ravichandran Ashwin 3/22 (4 overs) | | Virat Kohli 72* (44); Beuran Hendricks 2/31 (4 overs) |

India won by 6 wickets
Sher-e-Bangla National Cricket Stadium, Dhaka
Umpires: Kumar Dharmasena (SL) and Ian Gould (Eng)
Player of the match: Virat Kohli (Ind)

- South Africa won the toss and elected to bat

=== India 2016 ===
Squad

- Faf du Plessis (c)
- Hashim Amla
- AB de Villiers (wk)
- Quinton de Kock (wk)
- David Miller
- JP Duminy
- Farhaan Behardien
- Chris Morris
- David Wiese
- Imran Tahir
- Aaron Phangiso
- Kyle Abbott
- Kagiso Rabada
- Dale Steyn
- Rilee Rossouw

Results

| Super 10 (Group 2) | | | | | Semifinal | Final | Overall Result |
| Opposition Result | Opposition Result | Opposition Result | Opposition Result | Rank | Opposition Result | Opposition Result | Overall Result |
|---|---|---|---|---|---|---|---|
| England; L by 2 wickets | Afghanistan; W by 37 runs | West Indies; L by 3 wickets | Sri Lanka; W by 8 wickets | 3 | Did not advance | | Super 10 |
Source: ESPNcricinfo

Scorecards

Super 10 (Group 2)

18 March 2016
19:30 (D/N)
Scorecard

| South Africa; 229/4 (20 overs) | v | England; 230/8 (19.4 overs) |
| Hashim Amla 58 (31); Moeen Ali 2/34 (4 overs) | | Joe Root 83 (44); Kyle Abbott 3/41 (3.4 overs) |

England won by 2 wickets
Wankhede Stadium, Mumbai
Umpires: Sundaram Ravi (Ind) and Paul Reiffel (Aus)
Player of the match: Joe Root (Eng)

- England won the toss and elected to field.
- This was the highest successful run chase in a World Twenty20 match and the second highest in all T20I matches.
- Hashim Amla (SA) scored the most runs between dismissals in T20Is (224).
- Quinton de Kock equalled the record for the fastest fifty in T20Is for a South Africa player (21 balls).

20 March 2016
15:00 (D/N)
Scorecard

| South Africa; 209/5 (20 overs) | v | Afghanistan; 172 (20 overs) |
| AB de Villiers 64 (29); Amir Hamza 1/25 (3 overs) | | Mohammad Shahzad 44 (19); Chris Morris 4/27 (4 overs) |

South Africa won by 37 runs
Wankhede Stadium, Mumbai
Umpires: Chris Gaffaney (NZ) and Paul Reiffel (Aus)
Player of the match: Chris Morris (SA)

- South Africa won the toss and elected to bat.
- AB de Villiers (SA) scored the joint-second highest number of runs in one over in a World Twenty20 match (29).

25 March 2016
19:30 (D/N)
Scorecard

| South Africa; 122/8 (20 overs) | v | West Indies; 123/7 (19.4 overs) |
| Quinton de Kock 47 (46); Chris Gayle 2/17 (3 overs) | | Marlon Samuels 43 (44); Imran Tahir 2/13 (4 overs) |

West Indies won by 3 wickets
Vidarbha Cricket Association Stadium, Nagpur
Umpires: Ian Gould (Eng) and Richard Kettleborough (Eng)
Player of the match: Marlon Samuels (WI)

- West Indies won the toss and elected to field.

28 March 2016
19:30 (D/N)
Scorecard

| Sri Lanka; 120 (19.3 overs) | v | South Africa; 122/2 (17.4 overs) |
| Tillakaratne Dilshan 36 (40); Kyle Abbott 2/14 (3.3 overs) | | Hashim Amla 56* (52); Suranga Lakmal 1/28 (3.4 overs) |

South Africa won by 8 wickets
Feroz Shah Kotla Ground, Delhi
Umpires: Sundaram Ravi (Ind) and Rod Tucker (Aus)
Player of the match: Aaron Phangiso (SA)

- South Africa won the toss and elected to field.
- Hashim Amla became the fourth player for South Africa to pass 1,000 runs in T20Is.

=== Oman & UAE 2021 ===
Squad and kit

- Temba Bavuma (c)
- Quinton de Kock (wk)
- Reeza Hendricks
- Heinrich Klaasen (wk)
- David Miller
- Rassie van der Dussen
- Aiden Markram
- Wiaan Mulder
- Dwaine Pretorius
- Bjorn Fortuin
- Keshav Maharaj
- Lungi Ngidi
- Anrich Nortje
- Kagiso Rabada
- Tabraiz Shamsi

First kit

Second kit

Results

| Super 12 (Group 1) | | | | | | Semifinal | Final | Overall Result |
| Opposition Result | Opposition Result | Opposition Result | Opposition Result | Opposition Result | Rank | Opposition Result | Opposition Result | Overall Result |
|---|---|---|---|---|---|---|---|---|
| Australia; L by 5 wickets | West Indies; W by 8 wickets | Sri Lanka; W by 4 wickets | Bangladesh; W by 6 wickets | England; W by 10 runs | 3 | Did not advance | | Super 12 |
Source: ESPNcricinfo

Scorecards

Super 12 (Group 1)

23 October 2021
14:00
Scorecard

| South Africa; 118/9 (20 overs) | v | Australia; 121/5 (19.4 overs) |
| Aiden Markram 40 (36); Josh Hazlewood 2/19 (4 overs) | | Steve Smith 35 (34); Anrich Nortje 2/21 (4 overs) |

Australia won by 5 wickets
Sheikh Zayed Cricket Stadium, Abu Dhabi
Umpires: Michael Gough (Eng) and Nitin Menon (Ind)
Player of the match: Josh Hazlewood (Aus)

- Australia won the toss and elected to field.

26 October 2021
14:00
Scorecard

| West Indies; 143/8 (20 overs) | v | South Africa; 144/2 (18.2 overs) |
| Evin Lewis 56 (35); Dwaine Pretorius 3/17 (2 overs) | | Aiden Markram 51* (26); Akeal Hosein 1/27 (4 overs) |

South Africa won by 8 wickets
Dubai International Cricket Stadium, Dubai
Umpires: Aleem Dar (Pak) and Paul Reiffel (Aus)
Player of the match: Anrich Nortje (SA)

- South Africa won the toss and elected to field.

30 October 2021
14:00
Scorecard

| Sri Lanka; 142 (20 overs) | v | South Africa; 146/6 (19.5 overs) |
| Pathum Nissanka 72 (58); Tabraiz Shamsi 3/17 (4 overs) | | Temba Bavuma 46 (46); Wanindu Hasaranga 3/20 (4 overs) |

South Africa won by 4 wickets
Sharjah Cricket Stadium, Sharjah
Umpires: Joel Wilson (WI) and Paul Wilson (Aus)
Player of the match: Tabraiz Shamsi (SA)

- South Africa won the toss and elected to field.

2 November 2021
14:00
Scorecard

| Bangladesh; 84 (18.2 overs) | v | South Africa; 86/4 (13.3 overs) |
| Mahedi Hasan 27 (25); Anrich Nortje 3/8 (3.2 overs) | | Temba Bavuma 31* (28); Taskin Ahmed 2/18 (4 overs) |

South Africa won by 6 wickets
Sheikh Zayed Cricket Stadium, Abu Dhabi
Umpires: Richard Illingworth (Eng) and Paul Reiffel (Aus)
Player of the match: Kagiso Rabada (SA)

- South Africa won the toss and elected to field.

6 November 2021
18:00 (N)
Scorecard

| South Africa; 189/2 (20 overs) | v | England; 179/8 (20 overs) |
| Rassie van der Dussen 94* (60); Moeen Ali 1/27 (4 overs) | | Moeen Ali 37 (27); Kagiso Rabada 3/48 (4 overs) |

South Africa won by 10 runs
Sharjah Cricket Stadium, Sharjah
Umpires: Chris Brown (NZ) and Joel Wilson (WI)
Player of the match: Rassie van der Dussen (SA)

- England won the toss and elected to field.
- Kagiso Rabada became the first bowler for South Africa to take a hat-trick in T20Is.
- South Africa are eliminated as a result of this match.

=== Australia 2022 ===
Squad and kit

- Temba Bavuma (c)
- Quinton de Kock (wk)
- Reeza Hendricks
- Heinrich Klaasen (wk)
- David Miller
- Aiden Markram
- Rilee Rossouw
- Marco Jansen
- Wayne Parnell
- Keshav Maharaj
- Lungi Ngidi
- Anrich Nortje
- Kagiso Rabada
- Tabraiz Shamsi
- Tristan Stubbs

First kit

Second kit

Results

| Super 12 (Group 2) | | | | | | Semifinal | Final | Overall Result |
| Opposition Result | Opposition Result | Opposition Result | Opposition Result | Opposition Result | Rank | Opposition Result | Opposition Result | Overall Result |
|---|---|---|---|---|---|---|---|---|
| Zimbabwe; No result | Bangladesh; W by 104 runs | India; W by 5 wickets | Pakistan; L by 33 runs (DLS) | Netherlands; L by 13 runs | 3 | Did not advance | | Super 12 |
Source: ESPNcricinfo

Scorecards

Super 12 (Group 2)

24 October 2022
19:00 (N)
Scorecard

| Zimbabwe; 79/5 (9 overs) | v | South Africa; 51/0 (3 overs) |
| Wesley Madhevere 35* (18); Lungi Ngidi 2/20 (2 overs) | | Quinton de Kock 47* (18) |

No result
Bellerive Oval, Hobart
Umpires: Michael Gough (Eng) and Ahsan Raza (Pak)

- Zimbabwe won the toss and elected to bat.
- The match was reduced to 9 overs per side due to rain.
- South Africa were set a revised target of 64 runs in 7 overs due to rain.
- Rain during South Africa's innings prevented any further play.

27 October 2022
14:00
Scorecard

| South Africa; 205/5 (20 overs) | v | Bangladesh; 101 (16.3 overs) |
| Rilee Rossouw 109 (56); Shakib Al Hasan 2/33 (3 overs) | | Litton Das 34 (31); Anrich Nortje 4/10 (3.3 overs) |

South Africa won by 104 runs
Sydney Cricket Ground, Sydney
Umpires: Langton Rusere (Zim) and Rod Tucker (Aus)
Player of the match: Rilee Rossouw (SA)

- South Africa won the toss and elected to bat.

30 October 2022
19:00 (N)
Scorecard

| India; 133/9 (20 overs) | v | South Africa; 137/5 (19.4 overs) |
| Suryakumar Yadav 68 (40); Lungi Ngidi 4/29 (4 overs) | | David Miller 59* (46); Arshdeep Singh 2/25 (4 overs) |

South Africa won by 5 wickets
Perth Stadium, Perth
Umpires: Richard Kettleborough (Eng) and Langton Rusere (Zim)
Player of the match: Lungi Ngidi (SA)

- India won the toss and elected to bat.

3 November 2022
19:00 (N)
Scorecard

| Pakistan; 185/9 (20 overs) | v | South Africa; 108/9 (14 overs) |
| Shadab Khan 52 (22); Anrich Nortje 4/41 (4 overs) | | Temba Bavuma 36 (19); Shaheen Afridi 3/14 (3 overs) |

Pakistan won by 33 runs (DLS method)
Sydney Cricket Ground, Sydney
Umpires: Chris Gaffaney (NZ) and Paul Reiffel (Aus)
Player of the match: Shadab Khan (Pak)

- Pakistan won the toss and elected to bat.
- South Africa were set a revised target of 142 runs in 14 overs due to rain.

6 November 2022
10:30
Scorecard

| Netherlands; 158/4 (20 overs) | v | South Africa; 145/8 (20 overs) |
| Colin Ackermann 41* (26); Keshav Maharaj 2/27 (4 overs) | | Rilee Rossouw 25 (19); Brandon Glover 3/9 (2 overs) |

Netherlands won by 13 runs
Adelaide Oval, Adelaide
Umpires: Michael Gough (Eng) and Langton Rusere (Zim)
Player of the match: Colin Ackermann (Ned)

- South Africa won the toss and elected to field.
- South Africa were eliminated as a result of this match.

=== United States & West Indies 2024 ===
Squad and kit

- Aiden Markram (c)
- Ottniel Baartman
- Gerald Coetzee
- Quinton de Kock (wk)
- Bjorn Fortuin
- Reeza Hendricks
- Marco Jansen
- Heinrich Klaasen (wk)
- Keshav Maharaj
- David Miller
- Anrich Nortje
- Kagiso Rabada
- Ryan Rickelton (wk)
- Tabraiz Shamsi
- Tristan Stubbs

2024 kit

Results

| Group stage (Group D) | | | | | Super 8 (Group 2) | | | | Semifinal | Final | Overall Result |
| Opposition Result | Opposition Result | Opposition Result | Opposition Result | Rank | Opposition Result | Opposition Result | Opposition Result | Rank | Opposition Result | Opposition Result | Overall Result |
|---|---|---|---|---|---|---|---|---|---|---|---|
| Sri Lanka; W by 6 wickets | Netherlands; W by 4 wickets | Bangladesh; W by 4 runs | Nepal; W by 1 run | 1 | United States; W by 18 runs | England; W by 7 runs | West Indies; W by 3 wickets (DLS) | 1 | Afghanistan; W by 9 wickets | India; L by 7 runs | Runners-up |
Source: ESPNcricinfo

Scorecards

Group stage (Group D)

3 June 2024
10:30 UTC−4
Scorecard

| Sri Lanka; 77 (19.1 overs) | v | South Africa; 80/4 (16.2 overs) |
| Kusal Mendis 19 (30); Anrich Nortje 4/7 (4 overs) | | Quinton de Kock 20 (27); Wanindu Hasaranga 2/22 (3.2 overs) |

South Africa won by 6 wickets
Nassau County International Cricket Stadium, East Meadow
Umpires: Chris Brown (NZ) and Richard Kettleborough (Eng)
Player of the match: Anrich Nortje (SA)

- Sri Lanka won the toss and elected to bat.

8 June 2024
10:30 UTC−4
Scorecard

| Netherlands; 103/9 (20 overs) | v | South Africa; 106/6 (18.5 overs) |
| Sybrand Engelbrecht 40 (45); Ottneil Baartman 4/11 (4 overs) | | David Miller 59* (51); Vivian Kingma 2/12 (4 overs) |

South Africa won by 4 wickets
Nassau County International Cricket Stadium, East Meadow
Umpires: Chris Gaffaney (NZ) and Sharfuddoula (Ban)
Player of the match: David Miller (SA)

- South Africa won the toss and elected to field.

10 June 2024
10:30 UTC−4
Scorecard

| South Africa; 113/6 (20 overs) | v | Bangladesh; 109/7 (20 overs) |
| Heinrich Klaasen 46 (44); Tanzim Hasan Sakib 3/18 (4 overs) | | Towhid Hridoy 37 (34); Keshav Maharaj 3/27 (4 overs) |

South Africa won by 4 runs
Nassau County International Cricket Stadium, East Meadow
Umpires: Richard Illingworth (Eng) and Sam Nogajski (Aus)
Player of the match: Heinrich Klaasen (SA)

- South Africa won the toss and elected to bat.

14 June 2024
19:30 UTC−4 (N)
Scorecard

| South Africa; 115/7 (20 overs) | v | Nepal; 114/7 (20 overs) |
| Reeza Hendricks 43 (49); Kushal Bhurtel 4/19 (4 overs) | | Aasif Sheikh 42 (49); Tabraiz Shamsi 4/19 (4 overs) |

South Africa won by 1 run
Arnos Vale Stadium, Kingstown
Umpires: Jayaraman Madanagopal (Ind) and Joel Wilson (WI)
Player of the match: Tabraiz Shamsi (SA)

- Nepal won the toss and elected to field.

Super 8 (Group E)

19 June 2024
10:30 UTC−4
Scorecard

| South Africa; 194/4 (20 overs) | v | United States; 176/6 (20 overs) |
| Quinton de Kock 74 (40); Saurabh Netravalkar 2/21 (4 overs) | | Andries Gous 80* (47); Kagiso Rabada 3/18 (4 overs) |

South Africa won by 18 runs
Sir Vivian Richards Stadium, North Sound
Umpires: Chris Gaffaney (NZ) and Richard Kettleborough (Eng)
Player of the match: Quinton de Kock (SA)

- United States won the toss and elected to field.

21 June 2024
10:30 UTC−4
Scorecard

| South Africa; 163/6 (20 overs) | v | England; 156/6 (20 overs) |
| Quinton de Kock 65 (38); Jofra Archer 3/40 (4 overs) | | Harry Brook 53 (37); Keshav Maharaj 2/25 (4 overs) |

South Africa won by 7 runs
Daren Sammy Cricket Ground, Gros Islet
Umpires: Chris Brown (NZ) and Sharfuddoula (Ban)
Player of the match: Quinton de Kock (SA)

- England won the toss and elected to field.

23 June 2024
20:30 UTC−4 (N)
Scorecard

| West Indies; 135/8 (20 overs) | v | South Africa; 124/7 (16.1 overs) |
| Roston Chase 52 (42); Tabraiz Shamsi 3/27 (4 overs) | | Tristan Stubbs 29 (27); Roston Chase 3/12 (3 overs) |

South Africa won by 3 wickets (DLS method)
Sir Vivian Richards Stadium, North Sound
Umpires: Rod Tucker (Aus) and Alex Wharf (Eng)
Player of the match: Tabraiz Shamsi (SA)

- South Africa won the toss and elected to field.
- South Africa were set a revised target of 123 runs off 17 overs due to rain.
- South Africa qualified for the semi-finals as a result of this match.

Super 8 (Group E)

Semi-final 1
26 June 2024
20:30 UTC−4 (N)
Scorecard

| Afghanistan; 56 (11.5 overs) | v | South Africa; 60/1 (8.5 overs) |
| Azmatullah Omarzai 10 (12); Tabraiz Shamsi 3/6 (1.5 overs) | | Reeza Hendricks 29* (25); Fazalhaq Farooqi 1/11 (2 overs) |

South Africa won by 9 wickets
Brian Lara Cricket Academy, San Fernando
Umpires: Richard Illingworth (Eng) and Nitin Menon (Ind)
Player of the match: Marco Jansen (SA)

- Afghanistan won the toss and elected to bat.
- Anrich Nortje (SA) took his 50th wicket in T20Is.
- South Africa qualified for the T20 World Cup final for the first time.

Final
29 June 2024
10:30 UTC−4
Scorecard

| India; 176/7 (20 overs) | v | South Africa; 169/8 (20 overs) |
| Virat Kohli 76 (59); Keshav Maharaj 2/23 (3 overs) | | Heinrich Klaasen 52 (27); Hardik Pandya 3/20 (3 overs) |

India won by 7 runs
Kensington Oval, Bridgetown
Umpires: Chris Gaffaney (NZ) and Richard Illingworth (Eng)
Player of the match: Virat Kohli (Ind)

- India won the toss and elected to bat.

=== India & Sri Lanka 2026 ===
Squad and kit

- Aiden Markram (c)
- David Miller
- Quinton de Kock (wk)
- Keshav Maharaj
- Dewald Brevis
- Anrich Nortje
- Lungi Ngidi
- Kagiso Rabada
- George Linde
- Tristan Stubbs (wk)
- Corbin Bosch
- Ryan Rickelton
- Jason Smith
- Marco Jansen
- Kwena Maphaka
- Note: Tristan Stubbs and Ryan Rickelton replaced Tony de Zorzi and Donovan Ferreira

2026 kit

Results

| Group stage (Group D) | | | | | Super 8 | | | | Semifinal | Final | Overall Result |
| Opposition Result | Opposition Result | Opposition Result | Opposition Result | Rank | Opposition Result | Opposition Result | Opposition Result | Rank | Opposition Result | Opposition Result | Overall Result |
|---|---|---|---|---|---|---|---|---|---|---|---|
| Canada; W by 57 runs | Afghanistan; Tied (W the 2nd S/O) | New Zealand; W by 7 wickets | United Arab Emirates; W by 6 wickets | 1 | India; 22 Feb | West Indies; 26 Feb | Zimbabwe; 1 March | TBD | To be decided | | – |
Source: ESPNcricinfo

Scorecards

Group stage (Group D)

Match 9
9 February 2026
19:00 UTC+5:30 (N)
Scorecard

| South Africa; 213/4 (20 overs) | v | Canada; 156/8 (20 overs) |
| Aiden Markram 59 (32); Ansh Patel 3/31 (4 overs) | | Navneet Dhaliwal 64 (49); Lungi Ngidi 4/31 (4 overs) |

South Africa won by 57 runs
Narendra Modi Stadium, Ahmedabad
Umpires: Jayaraman Madanagopal (Ind) and Nitin Menon (Ind)
Player of the match: Lungi Ngidi (SA)

- Canada won the toss and elected to field.
- This was the first time South Africa and Canada faced each other in T20Is.

Match 13
11 February 2026
11:00 UTC+5:30
Scorecard

| South Africa; 187/6 (20 overs) | v | Afghanistan; 187 (19.4 overs) |
| Ryan Rickelton 61 (28); Azmatullah Omarzai 3/41 (4 overs) | | Rahmanullah Gurbaz 84 (42); Lungi Ngidi 3/26 (4 overs) |

Match tied (South Africa won the second Super Over)
Narendra Modi Stadium, Ahmedabad
Umpires: Jayaraman Madanagopal (Ind) and Sharfuddoula (Ban)
Player of the match: Lungi Ngidi (SA)

- Afghanistan won the toss and elected to field.
- Super Over: Afghanistan 17/0, South Africa 17/1.
- Second Super Over: South Africa 23/0, Afghanistan 19/2.

Match 24
14 February 2026
19:00 UTC+5:30 (N)
Scorecard

| New Zealand; 175/7 (20 overs) | v | South Africa; 178/3 (17.1 overs) |
| Mark Chapman 48 (26); Marco Jansen 4/40 (4 overs) | | Aiden Markram 86* (44); Rachin Ravindra 1/9 (1 over) |

South Africa won by 7 wickets
Narendra Modi Stadium, Ahmedabad
Attendance: 54,923
Umpires: Roland Black (Ire) and Paul Reiffel (Aus)
Player of the match: Marco Jansen (SA)

- South Africa won the toss and elected to field.
- Quinton de Kock (SA) became the first South African to score 3,000 runs in T20Is.
- Aiden Markram scored the fastest half-century (19 balls) for South Africa in the T20 World Cup and equalled with Rohit Sharma and Dasun Shanaka for the fastest half-century by a captain in the T20 World Cup.

Match 34
18 February 2026
11:00 UTC+5:30
Scorecard

| United Arab Emirates; 122/6 (20 overs) | v | South Africa; 123/4 (13.2 overs) |
| Alishan Sharafu 45 (38); Corbin Bosch 3/12 (4 overs) | | Dewald Brevis 36 (25); Muhammad Arfan 1/16 (2 overs) |

South Africa won by 6 wickets
Arun Jaitley Cricket Stadium, New Delhi
Umpires: Leslie Reifer (WI) and Rod Tucker (Aus)
Player of the match: Corbin Bosch (SA)

- South Africa won the toss and elected to field.

Super 8 (Group 2)

Match 43
22 February 2026
19:00 UTC+5:30 (N)
Scorecard

| South Africa; 187/7 (20 overs) | v | India; 111 (18.5 overs) |
| David Miller 63 (35); Jasprit Bumrah 3/15 (4 overs) | | Shivam Dube 42 (37); Marco Jansen 4/22 (3.5 overs) |

South Africa won by 76 runs
Narendra Modi Stadium, Ahmedabad
Attendance: 90,954
Umpires: Chris Gaffaney (NZ) and Richard Kettleborough (Eng)
Player of the match: David Miller (SA)

- South Africa won the toss and elected to bat.
- South Africa broke India's record 12-match win streak in T20 World Cups.
- This was India's first loss at an ICC limited-overs competition since the 2023 Cricket World Cup final.
- This was India's largest loss margin (by runs) in the history of T20 World Cup.
- Jasprit Bumrah broke Ravichandran Ashwin's record for most wickets taken by an Indian in the T20 World Cup.

Match 47
26 February 2026
15:00 UTC+5:30 (D/N)
Scorecard

| West Indies; 176/8 (20 overs) | v | South Africa; 177/1 (16.1 overs) |
| Romario Shepherd 52* (37); Lungi Ngidi 3/30 (4 overs) | | Aiden Markram 82* (46); Roston Chase 1/46 (4 overs) |

South Africa won by 9 wickets
Narendra Modi Stadium, Ahmedabad
Attendance: 28,422
Umpires: Kumar Dharmasena (SL) and Sharfuddoula (Ban)
Player of the match: Aiden Markram (SA)

- South Africa won the toss and elected to field.
- Jason Holder and Romario Shepherd (WI) recorded the highest partnership for the 8th wicket in T20Is.

Match 51
1 March 2026
15:00 UTC+5:30 (D/N)
Scorecard

| Zimbabwe; 153/7 (20 overs) | v | South Africa; 154/5 (17.5 overs) |
| Sikandar Raza 73 (43); Kwena Maphaka 2/21 (4 overs) | | Dewald Brevis 42 (18); Sikandar Raza 3/29 (4 overs) |

South Africa won by 5 wickets
Arun Jaitley Stadium, Delhi
Umpires: Kumar Dharmasena (SL) and Richard Illingworth (Eng)
Player of the match: Sikandar Raza (Zim)

- Zimbabwe won the toss and elected to bat.
- Lungi Ngidi became the first South African cricketer to take 90 wickets in T20Is.

== Records and statistics ==
=== Team records ===
Highest innings totals

| Score | Opponent | Venue | Season |
|---|---|---|---|
| 229/4 (20 overs) | England | Mumbai | 2016 |
| 211/5 (20 overs) | Scotland | The Oval | 2009 |
| 209/5 (20 overs) | Afghanistan | Mumbai | 2016 |
| 208/2 (17.4 overs) | West Indies | Johannesburg | 2007 |
| 205/5 (20 overs) | Bangladesh | Sydney | 2022 |
Last updated: 29 June 2024

=== Most appearances ===
This list consists players with most number of matches at the T20 World Cup.

| Matches | Player | Period |
|---|---|---|
| 35 | Quinton de Kock | 2014-2026 |
| 34 | David Miller | 2014-2026 |
| 30 | AB de Villiers | 2007-2016 |
| 29 | Kagiso Rabada | 2016-2026 |
| 27 | Aiden Markram | 2021-2026 |
Last updated: 04 March 2026

=== Batting statistics ===
Most runs

| Runs | Player | Mat | Inn | HS | Avg | 100s | 50s | Period |
|---|---|---|---|---|---|---|---|---|
| 717 | AB de Villiers | 30 | 29 | 79* | 29.87 | —N/a | 5 | 2007–2016 |
| 653 | Quinton de Kock | 27 | 27 | 74 | 25.11 | —N/a | 4 | 2014–2024 |
| 568 | JP Duminy | 25 | 23 | 86* | 40.57 | —N/a | 2 | 2007–2016 |
| 433 | Jacques Kallis | 15 | 13 | 73 | 36.08 | —N/a | 3 | 2009–2012 |
| 423 | David Miller | 27 | 22 | 59* | 30.21 | —N/a | 2 | 2014–2024 |
Last updated: 29 June 2024

Highest partnerships

| Runs | Players | Opposition | Venue | Season |
|---|---|---|---|---|
| 168 (2nd wicket) | Rilee Rossouw (96) & Quinton de Kock (63) | v Bangladesh | Sydney | 2022 |
| 120* (3rd wicket) | Justin Kemp (46*) & Herschelle Gibbs (63*) | v West Indies | Johannesburg | 2007 |
| 110 (2nd wicket) | Quinton de Kock (70) & Aiden Markram (36) | v United States | North Sound | 2024 |
| 103* (3rd wicket) | Rassie van der Dussen (49) & Aiden Markram (52) | v England | Sharjah | 2021 |
| 97 (2nd wicket) | Graeme Smith (36) & Jacques Kallis (59) | v India | Gros Islet | 2010 |
Last updated: 29 June 2024

=== Bowling statistics ===
Most wickets

| Wickets | Player | Matches | Avg. | Econ. | BBI | 4W | 5W | Period |
|---|---|---|---|---|---|---|---|---|
| 35 | Anrich Nortje | 19 | 11.40 | 5.55 | 4/7 | 3 | 0 | 2021–2024 |
| 30 | Dale Steyn | 23 | 19.30 | 6.96 | 4/17 | 1 | 0 | 2009–2016 |
| 28 | Kagiso Rabada | 22 | 22.35 | 8.06 | 3/18 | 0 | 0 | 2016–2024 |
| 24 | Morne Morkel | 17 | 18.83 | 7.21 | 4/17 | 2 | 0 | 2007–2014 |
| 23 | Tabraiz Shamsi | 12 | 13.26 | 6.95 | 4/19 | 1 | 0 | 2021–2024 |
Last updated: 29 June 2024
