= Robert Frylinck =

South African cricketer

Personal information
- Born: 27 September 1984 (age 42); Durban, Natal Province, South Africa
- Nickname: Friestan
- Height: 6 ft 1 in (1.85 m)
- Batting: Right-handed
- Bowling: Right-arm medium
- Role: All-rounder

International information
- National side: South Africa
- T20I debut (cap 73): 26 October 2017 v Bangladesh
- Last T20I: 12 October 2018 v Zimbabwe

Domestic team information
- Years: Team
- 2004/05–2007/08: KwaZulu-Natal
- 2005/06–2007/08: Dolphins
- 2008: Surrey
- 2008/09–2010/11: Lions
- 2008/09–2010/11: Gauteng
- 2011/12–2016/17: KwaZulu-Natal
- 2011/12–2020/21: Dolphins
- 2017: Trinbago Knight Riders
- 2018/19: Tshwane Spartans
- 2018/19: Chittagong Vikings
- 2019/20: KwaZulu-Natal Inland
- 2019/20: Khulna Tigers

Career statistics
Competition	T20I	FC	LA	T20
Matches	3	75	137	148
Runs scored	–	2,428	1,971	1,332
Batting average	–	24.52	26.28	20.49
100s/50s	–	1/13	0/8	0/2
Top score	–	100*	82*	63*
Balls bowled	60	13,011	5,811	2,868
Wickets	5	228	168	162
Bowling average	12.40	26.93	29.22	22.87
5 wickets in innings	0	11	2	2
10 wickets in match	0	2	0	0
Best bowling	2/20	8/30	5/39	5/16
Catches/stumpings	1/–	27/–	39/–	31/–
- Source: ESPNcricinfo, 4 May 2023

Robert Frylinck (born 27 September 1984) is a South African former professional cricketer who played three Twenty20 International matches for the South African national cricket team between 2017 and 2018 and last played domestically for Dolphins.

== Domestic career ==
He played domestic cricket for KwaZulu-Natal in South Africa until 2008, when he then moved to the Highveld Lions, then moving back to the Dolphins in 2011, and the hard-hitting all-rounder was seen by some as a natural successor to Lance Klusener.

Regarded as a late developer, he was not selected by Natal Schools at age group level playing 1st XI cricket for Westville Boys' High School in Grade 11 but opting not to play school cricket in his matric year in 2002, however his performances in South African club cricket drew the attention of KwaZulu-Natal's academy. Frylink made his List A debut for KwaZulu-Natal on 10 October 2004 in a UCB Provincial Shield match against Easterns.

Frylinck made his first-class debut on 13 October 2005 in the South African Airways Provincial Three-Day Challenge match against Western Province, taking impressive figures of 6/94 in 20 overs. In the same season he made his debut in the SuperSport Series for the Dolphins.

Frylinck was a member of the South African National Academy Squad in 2006.

After appearing for Kwazulu-Natal andDolphins in 16 first-class matches, Frylinck was not included among their contracted players for the 2008–09 season.

Frylinck has extensive experience of league cricket in England. In 2007, he played in one match for Nelson Cricket Club in the Lancashire League and in 16 matches for Vauxhall Mallards in the East Anglian Premier Cricket League. In 2008, he played in 20 matches for Benwell Hill Cricket Club in the North East Premier League.

On 10 June 2008, he made his debut for Surrey's second team in the Second Eleven Championship match away to Worcestershire, achieving bowling figures of 5–130 in the match, which Surrey won by 8 wickets. Subsequently, Frylinck made three appearances in the Second Eleven Trophy, a one-day competition. In these three matches, he took 7 wickets for 92 runs.

Having impressed Surrey's head coach, Alan Butcher, with his performances for the second team and his ability to bowl yorkers, slower balls and bouncers, Frylinck made his first team debut for Surrey on 17 August 2008 against Northants Steelbacks in the Pro40 league, taking 3–52.

Frylinck did not appear again for the Surrey first team in the 2008 season, but he made one further appearance in the Second Eleven Championship against Lancashire.

In October 2016, during the 2016–17 Sunfoil Series, Frylinck set a new South African franchise record for the best bowling figures in a match with 14 for 62.

== T20 franchise cricket ==
In August 2017, he was named in Pretoria Mavericks' squad for the first season of the T20 Global League. However, in October 2017, Cricket South Africa initially postponed the tournament until November 2018, with it being cancelled soon after.

In December 2017, he took a hat-trick in the 2017–18 Ram Slam T20 Challenge.

In October 2018, he was named in Tshwane Spartans' squad for the first edition of the Mzansi Super League T20 tournament. Later the same month, he was named in the squad for the Chittagong Vikings team, following the draft for the 2018–19 Bangladesh Premier League.

In July 2019, he was selected to play for the Dublin Chiefs in the inaugural edition of the Euro T20 Slam cricket tournament. However, the following month the tournament was cancelled. In November 2019, he was selected to play for the Khulna Tigers in the 2019–20 Bangladesh Premier League.

== International career ==
In October 2017, he was named in South Africa's Twenty20 International (T20I) squad for their series against Bangladesh. He made his T20I debut for South Africa against Bangladesh on 26 October 2017. Shakib Al Hasan was his first wicket in international cricket.
