= Sarel Erwee =

South African cricketer (born 1989)

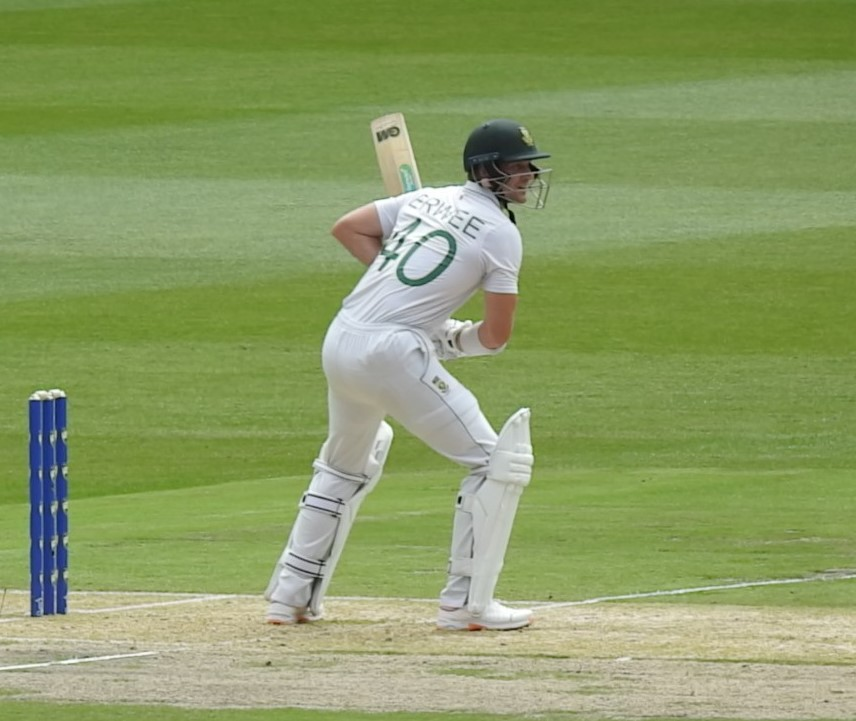
- Erwee batting in 2022

Personal information
- Full name: Sarel Johannes Erwee
- Born: 10 November 1989 (age 37); Pietermaritzburg, Natal, South Africa
- Batting: Left-handed
- Bowling: Right-arm off break
- Role: Opening batter

International information
- National side: South Africa
- Test debut (cap 350): 17 February 2022 v New Zealand
- Last Test: 4 January 2023 v Australia

Domestic team information
- Years: Team
- 2007/08–2019/20: KwaZulu-Natal Inland
- 2008/09–present: KwaZulu-Natal
- 2013/14–2020/21: Dolphins
- 2018–2019: Durban Heat
- 2023: Sunrisers Eastern Cape

Career statistics
| Competition | Test | FC | LA | T20 |
|---|---|---|---|---|
| Matches | 10 | 109 | 79 | 78 |
| Runs scored | 479 | 6,669 | 2,784 | 1,602 |
| Batting average | 26.61 | 38.10 | 40.94 | 23.55 |
| 100s/50s | 1/1 | 12/39 | 4/19 | 1/9 |
| Top score | 108 | 200* | 116* | 103* |
| Balls bowled | 0 | 616 | 150 | 64 |
| Wickets | – | 7 | 0 | 6 |
| Bowling average | – | 60.57 | – | 10.66 |
| 5 wickets in innings | – | 0 | – | 0 |
| 10 wickets in match | – | 0 | – | 0 |
| Best bowling | – | 2/15 | – | 2/14 |
| Catches/stumpings | 8/– | 86/– | 31/– | 31/– |
- Source: ESPNcricinfo, 27 February 2023

Sarel Johannes Erwee (born 10 November 1989) is a South African cricketer. He is a left-handed batter and a right-arm off-break bowler who plays for KwaZulu Natal Coastal. He was born in Pietermaritzburg. He made his international debut for the South Africa cricket team in February 2022.

== Career ==
Erwee made his List A debut in January 2008, against KZN Inland. As a lower-order batsman, he scored just a single run in his debut. He made his first-class debut in October 2008 against South Western Districts. Batting in the upper order, he scored 8 runs in his debut innings. He was included in the KZN Inland squad for the 2015 Africa T20 Cup.

In November 2017, he scored his first century in Twenty20 cricket, when he made 103 not out for Dolphins against Cape Cobras in the 2017–18 Ram Slam T20 Challenge.

In September 2018, he was named in KwaZulu-Natal Inland's squad for the 2018 Africa T20 Cup. The following month, he was named in Durban Heat's squad for the first edition of the Mzansi Super League T20 tournament. In September 2019, he was named in the squad for the Durban Heat team for the 2019 Mzansi Super League tournament.

In December 2020, Erwee was named in South Africa's Test squad for their series against Sri Lanka. In January 2021, Erwee was named in South Africa's Test squad for their series against Pakistan. In April 2021, he was named in KwaZulu-Natal's squad, ahead of the 2021–22 cricket season in South Africa. In May 2021, Erwee was again named in South Africa's Test squad, this time for their series against the West Indies. In December 2021, Erwee received another call-up to South Africa's Test squad, this time for their home series against India. In January 2022, he received a further call-up to the Test side, for their tour of New Zealand. He made his Test debut on 17 February 2022, for South Africa against New Zealand. In the second Test of the series, Erwee scored his first century in Test cricket, with 108 runs in the first innings.

== International centuries ==
Test centuries by Sarel Erwee
| No. | Runs | Balls | Innings | Against | Venue | Country | Date | Result |
|---|---|---|---|---|---|---|---|---|
| 1 | 108 | 221 | 1 | New Zealand | Hagley Oval, Christchurch | New Zealand | 25 February 2022 | South Africa won by 198 runs |
