= Richard Hooper (umpire) =

New Zealand cricket umpire

Personal information
- Full name: Richard Gary Hooper
- Born: 30 December 1976 (age 49); Ōtorohanga, New Zealand

Umpiring information
- WODIs umpired: 4 (2016–2017)
- Source: ESPNcricinfo, 18 February 2023

Richard Hooper (born 30 December 1976) is a New Zealand cricket umpire. He has stood in matches in the Plunket Shield in New Zealand and the Sunfoil Series in South Africa.

Prior to the February 2011 Christchurch earthquake, Hooper lived with his wife and their two girls in Rolleston. His wife, Amanda Hooper, died in the collapse of the PGC Building during the earthquake. Since the earthquake, Hooper has moved to New Plymouth, and found a new partner with whom he had a daughter in 2015.
