= Tertius Bosch =

South African cricketer (1966–2000)

Personal information
- Full name: Tertius Bosch
- Born: 14 March 1966; Vereeniging, Transvaal, South Africa
- Died: 14 February 2000 (aged 33); Westville, KwaZulu-Natal, South Africa
- Batting: Right-handed
- Bowling: Right-arm fast
- Role: Bowler
- Relatives: Corbin Bosch (son); Eathan Bosch (son)

International information
- National side: South Africa
- Test debut (cap 236): 18 April 1992 v West Indies
- Last Test: 18 April 1992 v West Indies
- ODI debut (cap 18): 29 February 1992 v New Zealand
- Last ODI: 12 April 1992 v West Indies

Domestic team information
- Years: Team
- 1986/87–1993/94: Northern Transvaal
- 1994/95–1997/98: Natal

Career statistics
Competition	Test	ODI	FC	LA
Matches	1	2	68	80
Runs scored	5	–	372	91
Batting average	–	–	8.08	6.50
100s/50s	0/0	–	0/0	0/0
Top score	5*	–	31	19*
Balls bowled	237	51	11,914	3,869
Wickets	3	0	210	105
Bowling average	34.66	–	27.56	24.18
5 wickets in innings	0	–	7	1
10 wickets in match	0	–	1	0
Best bowling	2/31	–	7/75	5/56
Catches/stumpings	0/–	0/–	20/–	10/–
- Source: CricketArchive, 25 August 2012

Tertius Bosch (14 March 1966 – 14 February 2000) was a South African cricketer who played in one Test and two ODIs in 1992.

== Cricketing career ==
A fast bowler, Bosch was educated at Handhaver Laerskool and Vereeniging Hoërskool, toured England and the Netherlands in 1982 with the South African Country Districts U/16s team and was named in the South African Country Districts Nuffield XI in 1983. He made his first-class debut in the 1986/1987 season, for Northern Transvaal B against Eastern Province B while studying for a dental degree at the University of Pretoria.

Bosch made his Test debut in South Africa's first Test match following their readmission to international cricket, against West Indies at Kensington Oval in Bridgetown, Barbados on 18 April 1992, and his One Day International debut on 29 February 1992, against New Zealand at Eden Park, Auckland.

== Death ==
Bosch's official cause of death was Guillain–Barré syndrome. In 2004 Bosch's sister applied successfully to the supreme court to stop his widow from inheriting the estate. Bosch had a previous joint will with his wife in which they had nominated each other as the sole heirs of their respective estates. After the joint will was concluded, and before the birth of their second child, Bosch wrote a series of notes regarding his wife's alleged infidelity. One of these handwritten notes stated that his oldest son was his sole heir. The court held that it was clear in the note, and in light of the surrounding circumstances, that Bosch had intended to disinherit his wife, and the court declared the note to be a valid will.

In 2001, his body was removed from Queensburgh cemetery for exhumation. His siblings hired private investigators and there were claims he suspected his wife of infidelity and had hired investigators to monitor her.

Bosch's sons Corbin Bosch and Eathan Bosch are current South African first-class cricketers.

== Sources ==
- Partidge, T., Heydenrych, F. & Sichel, P. (ed.) (1987) The 1987 Protea Cricket Annual of South Africa, South African Cricket Union: Cape Town.
