= Eathan Bosch =

South African cricketer (born 1998)

Personal information
- Born: 27 April 1998 (age 28); Westville, South Africa
- Batting: Right-handed
- Bowling: Right-arm fast
- Role: Bowler
- Relatives: Tertius Bosch (father); Corbin Bosch (brother)

International information
- National side: South Africa
- ODI debut (cap 155): 10 February 2025 v New Zealand
- Last ODI: 13 September 2026 v Namibia
- T20I debut (cap 121): 29 August 2026 v Zimbabwe
- Last T20I: 6 September 2026 v Zimbabwe

Domestic team information
- Years: Team
- 2016/17–2018/19: KwaZulu-Natal
- 2017/18–present: Dolphins
- 2018: Paarl Rocks
- 2019: Jozi Stars
- 2023–present: Pretoria Capitals
- 2024: Essex
- 2026: Middlesex

Career statistics
Competition	ODI	T20I	FC	LA
Matches	3	4	53	54
Runs scored	36	11	1,713	812
Batting average	36.00	11.00	26.35	31.23
100s/50s	0/0	0/0	1/12	0/3
Top score	29	7*	104	68
Balls bowled	119	78	6,858	2,275
Wickets	4	3	122	55
Bowling average	20.00	32.00	28.87	33.27
5 wickets in innings	0	0	3	1
10 wickets in match	0	0	0	0
Best bowling	3/27	2/22	6/38	5/26
Catches/stumpings	1/–	4/–	22/–	22/–
- Source: ESPNcricinfo, 27 September 2026

Eathan Bosch (born 27 April 1998) is a South African professional cricketer.

== Domestic cricket ==
He made his first-class debut for KwaZulu-Natal in the 2016–17 Sunfoil 3-Day Cup on 12 January 2017. He made his List A debut for KwaZulu-Natal in the 2016–17 CSA Provincial One-Day Challenge on 12 February 2017. He made his Twenty20 debut for Dolphins in the 2017–18 Ram Slam T20 Challenge on 12 November 2017.

In July 2018, he was named in the Cricket South Africa Emerging Squad. In September 2018, he was named in KwaZulu-Natal's squad for the 2018 Africa T20 Cup. The following month, he was named in Paarl Rocks' squad for the first edition of the Mzansi Super League T20 tournament. He was the leading wicket-taker for Dolphins in the 2018–19 CSA 4-Day Franchise Series, with 31 dismissals in nine matches.

In September 2019, he was named in the squad for the Jozi Stars team for the 2019 Mzansi Super League tournament. In April 2021, he was named in KwaZulu-Natal's squad, ahead of the 2021–22 cricket season in South Africa.

In June 2024, Bosch signed for Essex to play four matches in the 2024 County Championship.

In April 2026, he signed a contract to play for Middlesex until the end of that year's English county season.

== International cricket ==
On 5 February 2025, Bosch was named in the squad for the Tri-Series in Pakistan, his ODI debut.

On 29 August 2026, Bosch was named in the squad for the Tri-Series in Namibia, his T20I debut.
