= Lesiba Ngoepe =

South African cricketer (born 1993)

Personal information
- Born: 14 April 1993 (age 33); Vosloorus, South Africa
- Source: Cricinfo, 1 September 2015

Lesiba Ngoepe (born 14 April 1993) is a South African cricketer. He was included in the Western Province cricket team squad for the 2015 Africa T20 Cup. In August 2017, he was named in Nelson Mandela Bay Stars' squad for the first season of the T20 Global League. However, in October 2017, Cricket South Africa initially postponed the tournament until November 2018, with it being cancelled soon after.

In September 2018, he was named in Eastern Province's squad for the 2018 Africa T20 Cup. In April 2021, he was named in Eastern Province's squad, ahead of the 2021–22 cricket season in South Africa.
