= Khaya Zondo =

South African cricketer

Personal information
- Full name: Khayele Piyele Zondo
- Born: 7 March 1990 (age 36); Westville, Natal Province, South Africa
- Batting: Right-handed
- Bowling: Right-arm off break
- Role: Batter

International information
- National side: South Africa
- Test debut (cap 354): 8 April 2022 v Bangladesh
- Last Test: 4 January 2023 v Australia
- ODI debut (cap 124): 4 February 2018 v India
- Last ODI: 26 November 2021 v Netherlands

Domestic team information
- Years: Team
- 2007/08–2013/14: KwaZulu-Natal
- 2007/08–2020/21: Dolphins
- 2015/16–2019/20: KwaZulu-Natal Inland
- 2018: Durban Heat
- 2021/22–: KwaZulu-Natal

Career statistics
Competition	Test	ODI	FC	LA
Matches	5	6	153	174
Runs scored	120	146	7,196	4,167
Batting average	20.00	29.20	31.98	31.09
100s/50s	0/0	0/1	14/34	3/24
Top score	39	54	203*	117
Balls bowled	–	–	2,690	721
Wickets	–	–	43	17
Bowling average	–	–	38.20	36.76
5 wickets in innings	–	–	2	0
10 wickets in match	–	–	0	0
Best bowling	–	–	6/52	3/12
Catches/stumpings	2/–	1/–	91/–	68/–
- Source: Cricinfo, 15 July 2025

Khayelihle Piyele Zondo (born 7 March 1990) is a South African cricketer. He made his international debut for the South Africa cricket team in February 2018. In April 2022, he made his Test match debut for South Africa as a COVID-19 substitute.

== Domestic career ==
He was included in the KZN Inland squad for the 2015 Africa T20 Cup. In February 2017, he became the captain of the Dolphins cricket team, after Morné van Wyk stood down. He was also the part of the South African team that won the 2012 Hong Kong Cricket Sixes title.

He is the current captain of the South Africa A cricket team. In August 2017, he was named in Pretoria Mavericks squad for the first season of the T20 Global League. However, in October 2017, Cricket South Africa initially postponed the tournament until November 2018, with it being cancelled soon after.

In October 2018, he was named in Durban Heat's squad for the first edition of the Mzansi Super League T20 tournament. He was the leading run-scorer for the team in the tournament, with 216 runs in ten matches.

In December 2018, he scored his tenth century in first-class cricket, batting for Dolphins against Lions in the 2018–19 CSA 4-Day Franchise Series. In September 2019, he was named in the squad for the Durban Heat team for the 2019 Mzansi Super League tournament. In April 2021, he was named in KwaZulu-Natal's squad, ahead of the 2021–22 cricket season in South Africa.

In October 2021, in the opening round of matches in the 2021–22 CSA 4-Day Series, Zondo scored his maiden double century in first-class cricket, with 203 not out against Western Province.

== International career ==
In January 2018, he was named in South Africa's One Day International (ODI) squad for their series against India. He made his ODI debut for South Africa against India on 4 February 2018.

In March 2022, Zondo was named in South Africa's Test squad for their series against Bangladesh. Zondo made his Test debut on 8 April 2022, for South Africa against Bangladesh as a COVID-19 substitute.
