= Keshav Maharaj =

South African cricketer (born 1990)

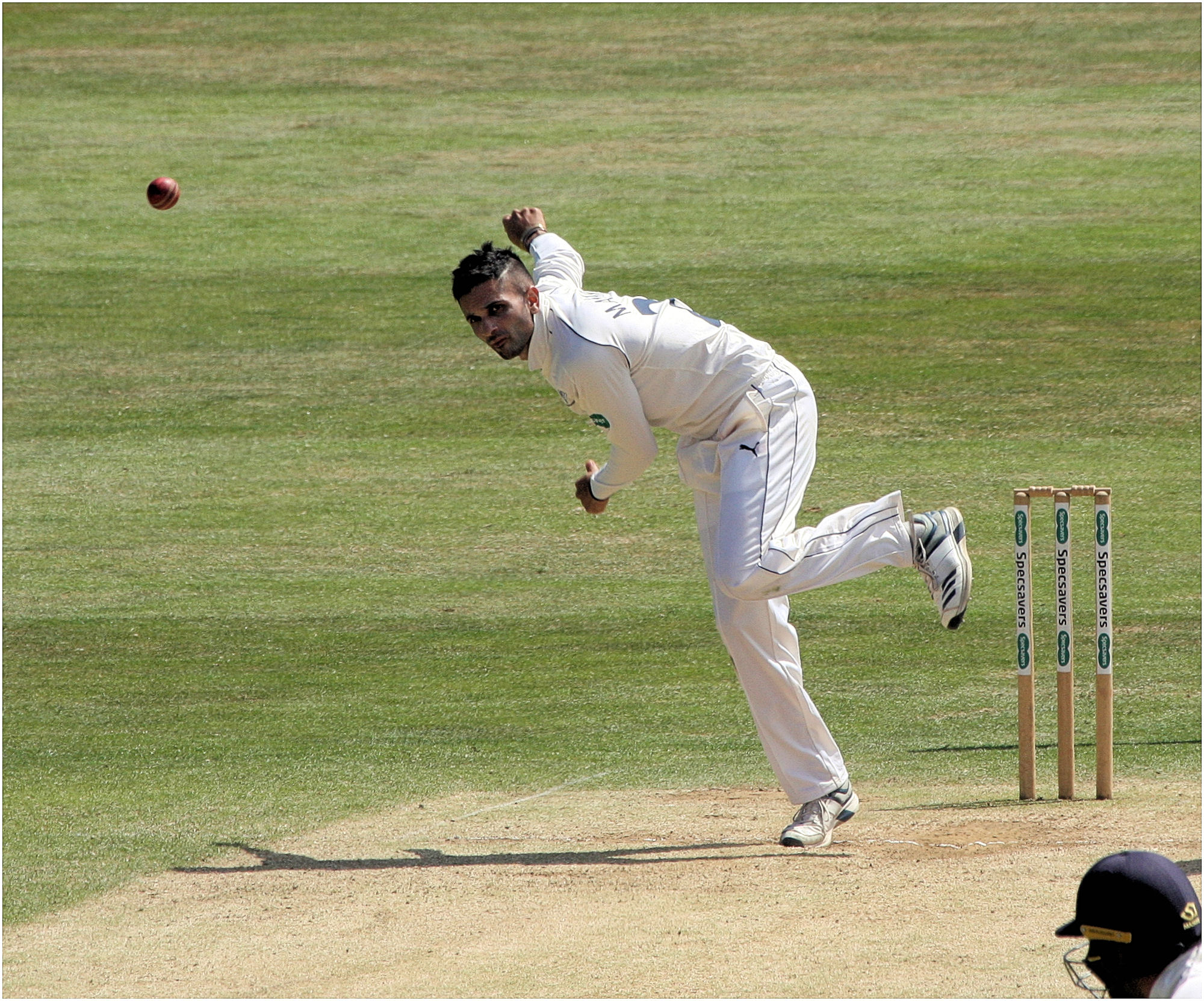
- Maharaj bowling for Yorkshire in 2019

Personal information
- Full name: Keshav Athmanand Maharaj
- Born: 7 February 1990 (age 36); Durban, Natal Province, South Africa
- Height: 178 cm (5 ft 10 in)
- Batting: Right-handed
- Bowling: Slow left-arm orthodox
- Role: Bowler

International information
- National side: South Africa (2016–present)
- Test debut (cap 327): 3 November 2016 v Australia
- Last Test: 22 November 2025 v India
- ODI debut (cap 120): 27 May 2017 v England
- Last ODI: 27 September 2026 v Australia
- ODI shirt no.: 16
- T20I debut (cap 94): 10 September 2021 v Sri Lanka
- Last T20I: 25 March 2026 v New Zealand
- T20I shirt no.: 16

Domestic team information
- Years: Team
- 2006–present: KwaZulu-Natal
- 2009–present: Dolphins
- 2018: Lancashire
- 2018–2021: Durban Heat
- 2019: Yorkshire
- 2023–2025: Durban's Super Giants
- 2024: Rajasthan Royals
- 2024: Fortune Barishal
- 2025-present: Pretoria Capitals
- 2026: Mumbai Indians
- 2026: Glasgow Cosmic

Career statistics
Competition	Test	ODI	T20I	FC
Matches	63	58	54	172
Runs scored	1,369	328	107	4,288
Batting average	15.55	13.66	8.91	19.94
100s/50s	0/6	0/0	0/0	2/18
Top score	84	40	41	114*
Balls bowled	12,482	3,001	1,103	35,324
Wickets	220	79	55	653
Bowling average	29.55	29.69	26.30	26.93
5 wickets in innings	12	1	0	40
10 wickets in match	1	0	0	8
Best bowling	9/129	5/33	3/24	9/129
Catches/stumpings	24/–	14/–	15/–	66/–
Medal record
Men's cricket
Representing South Africa
World Test Championship
Winner	2023–2025
T20 World Cup
Runner-up	2024 West Indies & USA
- Source: ESPNcricinfo, 13 October 2026

Keshav Athmanand Maharaj (born 7 February 1990) is a South African professional cricketer who plays as a left-arm orthodox spin bowler for the South Africa national team, KwaZulu-Natal and the Dolphins. He also plays for Pretoria Capitals in the SA20.

Since making his international debut in 2016, Maharaj has been a regular member of the South Africa team, having won the 2023–2025 World Test Championship. He has captained the national team in multiple matches.

== Early and personal life ==
Maharaj was born on 7 February 1990 to Athmanand Maharaj and Kanchan Mala in Durban, KwaZulu-Natal. Maharaj is of Indian ancestry, his great-grandfather hailed from Sultanpur, Uttar Pradesh, India and migrated to Durban in 1874 as an indentured labourer. His father played as a wicket keeper for KwaZulu-Natal. He has a sister Tarisma Mahesan.

In April 2022, Maharaj married his longtime girlfriend Lerisha Munsamy, a kathak dancer.

== Domestic career ==
Maharaj made his first-class debut at the age of 16 for KwaZulu-Natal during the 2006–07 season. In 2009-10, he represented the Dolphins team. Maharaj toured Bangladesh with the South Africa A team in April–May 2010, taking 13 wickets in the two four-day matches against Bangladesh Cricket Board team. He also took 4 for 12 off four overs, opening the bowling, in one of the T20 matches. He also played for South Africa A against the touring Bangladesh A team in 2010–11.

In the 2012–13 domestic season, Maharaj has his best season with the bat when he made 481 first-class runs at an average of 48.1 including two centuries. He scored 114 runs off 119 balls and took 5 wickets in a match against Northerns.

Maharaj played for Cuckfield in the Sussex Premier League in 2013, and as Nelson's professional in the Lancashire League in 2015. For Dolphins against the Cape Cobras in 2014–15, Maharaj took his best innings and match figures to that point: 6 for 58 and 10 for 145. Dolphins won, and he received the man of the match award. He finished the season with 44 first-class wickets at an average of 26.18. He was included in the KwaZulu-Natal squad for the 2015 Africa T20 Cup.

In the first match of the 2016–17 season, playing for the Dolphins against the Warriors, Maharaj scored 72 then took 7 for 89 and 6 for 68 in an innings victory for the Dolphins, the first time he had taken seven wickets in an innings or 13 wickets in a match.

In October 2018, Maharaj was named in Durban Heat's squad for the first edition of the Mzansi Super League T20 tournament. After appearing for Lancashire in 2018, Maharaj played five matches for Yorkshire in the 2019 County Championship, taking 38 wickets at an average of 18.92, as the team finished in 5th place. In September 2019, Maharaj was named in the squad for the Durban Heat team for the 2019 Mzansi Super League tournament. In April 2021, he was named in KwaZulu-Natal's squad, ahead of the 2021–22 cricket season in South Africa.

On 27 February 2023, he joined Middlesex on an overseas registration for the LV= County Championship and the Vitality t20 Blast competitions but was later forced to withdraw due to an achilles tendon injury.

Maharaj also played for Fortune Barishal in 2024 Bangladesh Premier League.

In the SA20, Maharaj plays for and captains the Pretoria Capitals, having previously captained the Durban's Super Giants.

== International career ==
=== Debut and early years ===
In October 2016, Maharaj was named in South Africa's squad for their series against Australia. He made his Test debut against the Australia on 3 November 2016 and picked up three wickets. He was the first specialist spinner to make his Test debut at Perth.

On 10 March 2017, Maharaj took his maiden five-wicket haul in Tests against New Zealand. This was only the seventh five-for by a South African spinner in Tests against New Zealand. In April 2017, Maharaj was named in South Africa's One Day International (ODI) squad for their series against England and the 2017 ICC Champions Trophy. He made his ODI debut for South Africa against England on 27 May 2017. In May 2017, Maharaj was named International Newcomer of the Year at Cricket South Africa's annual awards. In October 2017, he took his 50th wicket in Tests, during the first Test against Bangladesh.

=== Middle years ===
In July 2018, during the second Test match against Sri Lanka, Maharaj registered his best Test bowling figures in an innings of 9 for 129 and also registered the best ever bowling figures in a Test innings by a visiting bowler in Sri Lanka. He also recorded the best ever bowling figures in a Test innings by a South African in Asia. His figures of 9 for 129 are the second-best bowling figures by a South African in an innings of a Test after Hugh Tayfield and the best Test bowling figures by a South African since readmission to international cricket in 1991. He became the second left-arm spinner, after Rangana Herath, to claim 9 wickets in a test innings. In August 2018, Maharaj was named in South Africa's Twenty20 International (T20I) squad for the one-off match against Sri Lanka, but he did not play in the fixture. In October 2019, during the series against India, Maharaj took his 100th wicket in Test cricket.

In November 2020, Maharaj was named in South Africa's squad for their limited overs series against England. On 21 June 2021, Maharaj took South Africa's second ever Test hat-trick, and first since Geoff Griffin at Lord's in 1960, during the fourth day of the second Test match of South Africa's tour of the West Indies. In September 2021, Maharaj was named in South Africa's squad for the 2021 ICC Men's T20 World Cup despite being uncapped in T20Is. He made his T20I debut on 10 September 2021, for South Africa against Sri Lanka as the team's captain, and took a wicket with his first ball in T20Is. He also helped South Africa win the series 3-0 after South Africa lost the ODI series to Sri Lanka 2–1.

=== Injury and return ===
In March 2023, Maharaj ruptured his achilles tendon during a match against West Indies. In September 2023, Maharaj was named in the South African squad for the 2023 Cricket World Cup in India after making a sooner than expected recovery from his injury. He was the lead spinner in the team and extracted drift, turn and bounce from the pitch and was one of the most economical bowlers in the tournament with an economy rate of 4.15. He also contributed with the bat including a tenth wicket partnership with Tabraiz Shamsi leading to a win against Pakistan during a group stage fixture at Chennai. In November 2023, during the 2023 world cup, he became the number one bowler in ICC ODI bowling rankings.

In May 2024, he was named in South Africa’s squad for the 2024 ICC Men's T20 World Cup tournament.

On 19 August 2025, Maharaj took his first 5-wicket haul in One Day International cricket, against Australia at Cazaly's Stadium.

== International five-wicket hauls ==
Test five-wicket hauls by Keshav Maharaj
No.	Bowling Figures	Overs	Innings	Against	Venue	Country	Date	Result
1	5/94	28.3	2	New Zealand	University of Otago Oval, Dunedin	New Zealand	8 March 2017	Match drawn
2	6/40	20.2	3	England	Basin Reserve, Wellington	New Zealand	16 March 2017	South Africa won by 8 wickets
3	5/59	17.3	3	Zimbabwe	St George's Park, Port Elizabeth	South Africa	26 December 2017	South Africa won by an innings and 120 runs
4	5/123	33.4	1	Australia	Kingsmead Cricket Ground, Durban	South Africa	1 March 2018	Australia won by 118 runs
5	9/129	41.1	1	Sri Lanka	Sinhalese Sports Club Cricket Ground, Colombo	Sri Lanka	20 July 2018	Sri Lanka won by 199 runs
6	5/180	58	1	England	St George's Park, Port Elizabeth	South Africa	16 January 2020	England won by an innings and 53 runs
7	5/36	17.3	4	West Indies	Darren Sammy Cricket Ground, Rodney Bay	Saint Lucia	18 June 2021	South Africa won by 158 runs
8	7/32	10	4	Bangladesh	Kingsmead Cricket Ground, Durban	South Africa	31 March 2022	South Africa won by 220 runs
9	7/40	12	4	Bangladesh	St George's Park, Port Elizabeth	South Africa	8 April 2022	South Africa won by 332 runs
10	5/59	16.4	3	Bangladesh	Zahur Ahmed Chowdhury Stadium, Chittagong	Bangladesh	29 October 2024	South Africa won by and innings and 273 runs
11	5/76	25	4	Sri Lanka	St George's Park, Port Elizabeth	South Africa	5 December 2024	South Africa won by 109 runs
12	7/102	42.4	1	Pakistan	Rawalpindi Cricket Stadium, Rawalpindi	Pakistan	20 October 2025	South Africa won by 8 wickets

ODI five-wicket hauls by Keshav Maharaj
No.	Bowling Figures	Overs	Innings	Against	Venue	Country	Date	Result
1	5/33	10	2	Australia	Cazalys Stadium, Cairns	Australia	19 August 2025	South Africa won by 98 runs
