= Justin Ontong =

South African cricketer

Personal information
- Full name: Justin Lee Ontong
- Born: 4 January 1980 (age 46); Paarl, Cape Province, South Africa
- Nickname: Rowdy
- Batting: Right-handed
- Bowling: Right-arm off-spin
- Role: Batsman

International information
- National side: South Africa (2001–2015)
- Test debut (cap 282): 2 January 2002 v Australia
- Last Test: 28 November 2004 v India
- ODI debut (cap 64): 28 April 2001 v West Indies
- Last ODI: 7 November 2008 v Bangladesh
- ODI shirt no.: 14 (previously 23)
- T20I debut (cap 33): 18 January 2008 v West Indies
- Last T20I: 14 January 2015 v West Indies
- T20I shirt no.: 14 (previously 23)

Domestic team information
- Years: Team
- 1997/98–2003/04: Boland
- 2004/05–2007/08: Lions
- 2008/09–2017: Cape Cobras

Career statistics
Competition	Test	ODI	T20I	FC
Matches	2	28	14	167
Runs scored	57	184	158	9,978
Batting average	19.00	13.14	15.80	40.54
100s/50s	0/0	0/0	0/0	19/54
Top score	32	32	48	166
Balls bowled	185	538	36	10,358
Wickets	1	9	1	128
Bowling average	133.00	44.00	66.00	42.47
5 wickets in innings	0	0	0	1
10 wickets in match	0	0	0	0
Best bowling	1/79	3/30	1/25	5/62
Catches/stumpings	1/–	15/–	7/–	117/–
- Source: ESPNcricinfo, 14 January 2015

Justin Lee Ontong (born 4 January 1980) is a former South African cricketer, who played domestic cricket for the Cape Cobras. He has played two Test matches, 26 One Day Internationals and twelve Twenty20 Internationals as an all-rounder.

== Cricketing career ==
Ontong began his first-class career with Boland, making his debut in February 1998 against Natal in Paarl.

He toured Pakistan with the South Africa under-19 team in February 1999, and then Ireland and Scotland with the South Africa Academy later that year. He played for a South African Invitation XI against the touring England team in January 2000, and was a member of the South Africa A squad that went to the West Indies in August and September 2000.

His first elevation to the full South African squad came with the tour of the West Indies in early 2001, where his quiet demeanour earned him the nickname "Rowdy" from his teammates. He made his international debut in the first ODI in Jamaica, scoring 11 at number nine and bowling five overs. He went on to play in six of the seven matches in the series, but recorded just 13 runs and two wickets in total.

He played a further One Day International in Zimbabwe in September 2001, before being selected for the tour of Australia that followed. Left out of the first two Test matches, he was then thrust into the limelight by being selected for the Sydney Test amid much controversy. After the selectors chose Jacques Rudolph ahead of him, they were overruled by Percy Sonn, then president of the UCB. Sonn insisted that Ontong, a Cape Coloured, play instead of Rudolph as part of South Africa's racial quota policy, and Ontong duly made his Test debut at the SCG. He scored 9 and 32 in a heavy defeat.

Ontong has continued to play intermittently for South Africa in one-day cricket, but has made just one further Test appearance, against India in Kolkata in 2004.

He returned his best bowling figures of 4/66 against Border in 2002–03, and compiled his highest first-class score of 166 against Eastern Province the following season.

In 2004–05, Ontong moved to the newly formed Lions franchise, and played for them for four seasons, before joining the Cape Cobras as captain in September 2008.

Following brilliant form for Cape Cobras in the 2011–12 season, he got a national call-up to South Africa's Twenty20 and 50-over side against New Zealand, at the expense of the experienced Graeme Smith.

In August 2017, he was named in Stellenbosch Monarchs' squad for the first season of the T20 Global League. However, in October 2017, Cricket South Africa initially postponed the tournament until November 2018, with it being cancelled soon after.
