= Colin Ackermann =

Dutch-South African cricketer

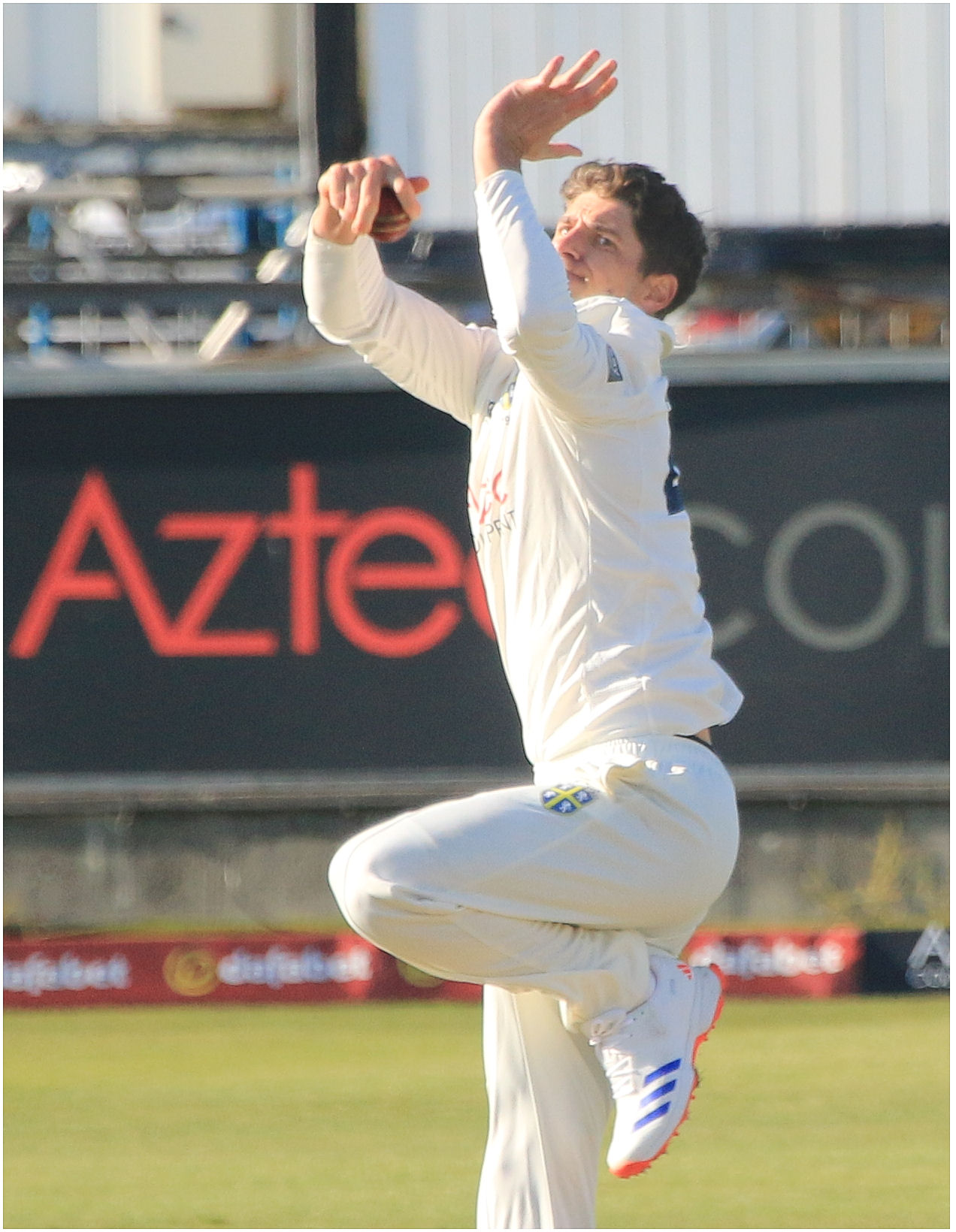
- Ackermann playing for Durham (2025)

Personal information
- Full name: Colin Niel Ackermann
- Born: 4 April 1991 (age 35); George, Cape Province, South Africa
- Batting: Right-handed
- Bowling: Right-arm off break
- Role: All-rounder

International information
- National side: Netherlands (2019–present)
- ODI debut (cap 75): 26 November 2021 v South Africa
- Last ODI: 13 March 2025 v Namibia
- ODI shirt no.: 48
- T20I debut (cap 50): 5 October 2019 v Ireland
- Last T20I: 18 February 2026 v India
- T20I shirt no.: 48

Domestic team information
- Years: Team
- 2010/11–2016/17: Eastern Province
- 2011/12–2018/19: Warriors (squad no. 48)
- 2017–2023: Leicestershire (squad no. 48)
- 2021–2022: Manchester Originals
- 2023: Sylhet Strikers
- 2023: Southern Brave
- 2023/24: Pretoria Capitals
- 2024–present: Durham (squad no. 48)

Career statistics
Competition	ODI	T20I	FC	LA
Matches	21	29	196	135
Runs scored	505	590	12,251	3,764
Batting average	28.05	23.60	40.29	35.84
100s/50s	0/4	0/1	28/69	4/25
Top score	81	62	277*	152*
Balls bowled	722	318	8,131	3,507
Wickets	15	11	94	72
Bowling average	35.60	32.09	47.67	39.01
5 wickets in innings	0	0	1	0
10 wickets in match	0	0	0	0
Best bowling	4/22	3/15	5/69	4/22
Catches/stumpings	9/–	8/–	212/–	82/–
- Source: Cricinfo, 27 September 2026

Colin Niel Ackermann (born 4 April 1991) is a Dutch-South African cricketer who plays for Durham County Cricket Club in England and the Netherlands national cricket team. He made his international debut for the Netherlands in October 2019.

He served as the Leicestershire club captain (2020–2022).

== Early life ==
Ackermann was born on 4 April 1991 in George, Cape Province, South Africa. He studied at Outeniqua Primary School in George and Grey High School in Port Elizabeth. He was the vice-captain of South Africa at the 2010 Under-19 Cricket World Cup.

== Domestic career ==
In 2014, Ackermann represented the North Holland Hurricanes in the North Sea Pro Series. He won a Topklasse title with Dosti Amsterdam in 2015.

In the 2016 season, he scored the most runs in the 2016–17 Sunfoil Series, with a total of 883 from ten matches and seventeen innings.

Ahead of the 2017 season, Ackermann signed for English county team Leicestershire on a two-year contract. In May 2017, he was named Domestic Players' Player of the Season at Cricket South Africa's annual awards. In August 2017, he was named in Nelson Mandela Bay Stars' squad for the first season of the T20 Global League. However, in October 2017, Cricket South Africa initially postponed the tournament until November 2018, with it being cancelled soon after.

On 7 August 2019, in the 2019 t20 Blast in England, Ackermann took seven wickets for eighteen runs for Leicestershire against the Birmingham Bears. These were the best bowling figures in a Twenty20 cricket match. In April 2022, he was bought by the Manchester Originals for the 2022 season of The Hundred. In July 2022, in the County Championship, Ackermann scored his maiden double century in first-class cricket with 277 not out.

== International career ==
In June 2019, Ackermann became available to play for the Netherlands cricket team, ahead of the 2019 ICC T20 World Cup Qualifier tournament in the United Arab Emirates. In September 2019, he was named in the Dutch squads for the 2019–20 Oman Pentangular Series and the 2019 ICC T20 World Cup Qualifier tournament. He made his Twenty20 International (T20I) debut for the Netherlands, against Ireland, on 5 October 2019.

In September 2021, Ackermann was named as the vice-captain of the Dutch squad for the 2021 ICC Men's T20 World Cup. In November 2021, Ackermann was named in the Dutch One Day International (ODI) squad for their series against South Africa. He made his ODI debut on 26 November 2021, for the Netherlands against South Africa. In September 2023, he was included in Netherlands' squad for the World Cup to be played in India.
