= Reeza Hendricks =

South African cricketer (born 1989)

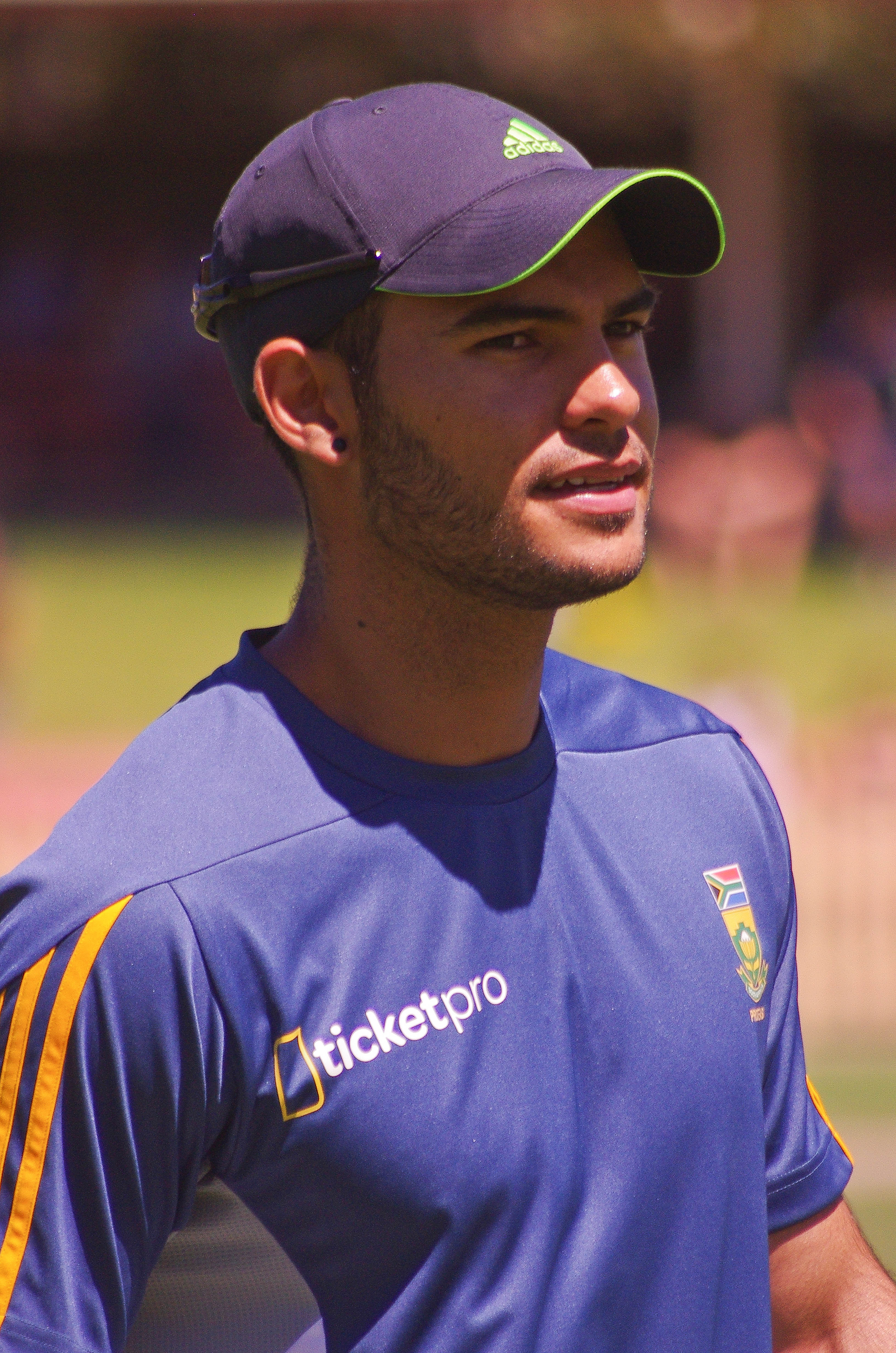
- Hendricks in 2014

Personal information
- Full name: Reeza Raphael Hendricks
- Born: 14 August 1989 (age 37); Kimberley, Northern Cape, South Africa
- Height: 175 cm (5 ft 9 in)
- Batting: Right-handed
- Bowling: Right-arm off break
- Role: Opening batsman

International information
- National side: South Africa (2014–present)
- ODI debut (cap 127): 5 August 2018 v Sri Lanka
- Last ODI: 7 October 2024 v Ireland
- ODI shirt no.: 17
- T20I debut (cap 61): 5 November 2014 v Australia
- Last T20I: 14 December 2025 v India
- T20I shirt no.: 17

Domestic team information
- Years: Team
- 2006/07–2015/16: Griqualand West
- 2006/07–2015/16: Knights (squad no. 17)
- 2016/17–2020/21: Lions
- 2018–2019: Jozi Stars
- 2021/22–present: Gauteng
- 2023: Joburg Super Kings
- 2024: Rangpur Riders
- 2024: Multan Sultans
- 2024–present: Dambulla Sixers
- 2025: MI Cape Town
- 2026: Karachi Kings

Career statistics
Competition	ODI	T20I	FC	LA
Matches	38	88	146	226
Runs scored	974	2,491	8,160	7,409
Batting average	27.05	29.30	33.58	36.14
100s/50s	1/7	1/18	16/39	17/43
Top score	102	117	168*	181
Balls bowled	42	29	983	876
Wickets	1	0	11	24
Bowling average	47.00	–	63.54	32.70
5 wickets in innings	0	–	0	0
10 wickets in match	0	–	0	0
Best bowling	1/13	–	2/25	3/18
Catches/stumpings	22/–	41/–	146/–	103/–
Medal record
Men's Cricket
Representing South Africa
ICC T20 World Cup
Runner-up	2024 West Indies & USA
- Source: ESPNcricinfo, 11 December 2025

Reeza Raphael Hendricks (born 14 August 1989) is a South African cricketer who plays for MI Cape Town, Gauteng and the South Africa national cricket team. He is a right-handed opening batsman. He made his international debut for South Africa in November 2014. In 2018 during his first ODI, he became only the third South African to score a century on debut.

== Domestic career ==
In November 2017, Hendricks scored his first century in a Twenty20 match, when he made 102 not out for Lions against Dolphins in the 2017–18 Ram Slam T20 Challenge. He was the leading run-scorer during the tournament, finishing with 361 runs in eight matches. In January 2018, he became the first player to score a century in all three franchise competitions in South Africa in the same season, after scoring a List A century in the final round of the 2017–18 Momentum One Day Cup.

In June 2018, Hendricks was named in the squad for the Highveld Lions team for the 2018–19 season. In October 2018, he was named in Jozi Stars' squad for the first edition of the Mzansi Super League T20 tournament. Hendricks scored 410 runs in MSL 2018, subsequently earning a place in the national side. In September 2019, he was named in the squad for the Jozi Stars team for the 2019 Mzansi Super League tournament. In April 2021, he was named in Gauteng's squad, ahead of the 2021–22 cricket season in South Africa.

In April 2022, in the Division One final of the 2021–22 CSA One-Day Cup, Hendricks scored 157 runs for Lions, as they beat Titans by three wickets to win the title.

In September 2022, Hendricks was bought by the Johannesburg Super Kings for the inaugural season of the SA20 competition, scheduled to take place in 2023.

== International career ==
Hendricks made his Twenty20 International debut for South Africa against Australia on 5 November 2014. He was included in the Griqualand West cricket team squad for the 2015 Africa T20 Cup. In August 2017, he was named in Pretoria Mavericks' squad for the first season of the T20 Global League. However, in October 2017, Cricket South Africa initially postponed the tournament until November 2018, with it being cancelled soon after.

In June 2018, Hendricks was named in South Africa's One Day International (ODI) squad for their series against Sri Lanka. He made his ODI debut for South Africa against Sri Lanka on 5 August 2018. He became the third batsman for South Africa, and fourteenth overall, to score a century on ODI debut. His 88-ball century was the fastest by a batsman on ODI debut and he won the man of the match award.

In September 2021, Hendricks was named in South Africa's squad for the 2021 ICC Men's T20 World Cup. He was also named in 2023 Cricket World Cup squad of South Africa to be played in India.

In December 2023, he was picked by Multan Sultans in gold category for the ninth edition of Pakistan Super League.

In May 2024, he was named in South Africa’s squad for the 2024 ICC Men's T20 World Cup tournament.

In December 2024, during the second T20 match of the series against Pakistan in Centurion, He scored his maiden T20 international century.

== International centuries ==
ODI centuries by Reeza Hendricks
No.	Runs	Balls	Innings	Against	Venue	Country	Date	Result
1	102	89	1	Sri Lanka	Pallekele International Cricket Stadium, Kandy	Sri Lanka	5 August 2018	South Africa won by 78 runs

T20I centuries by Reeza Hendricks
No.	Runs	Balls	Innings	Against	Venue	Country	Date	Result
1	117	63	2	Pakistan	Centurion Park, Centurion	South Africa	13 December 2024	South Africa won by 7 wickets
