= Grant Mokoena =

South African cricketer (born 1987)

Grant Mokoena (born 2 August 1987 in Soweto) is a South African cricketer. A right-handed batsman, Mokoena played for Gauteng and Highveld Lions in the South African domestic cricket competitions.

Mokoena represented South Africa in the 2006 U-19 Cricket World Cup in Sri Lanka. He was included in the North West cricket team squad for the 2015 Africa T20 Cup. In August 2017, he was named in Stellenbosch Monarchs' squad for the first season of the T20 Global League. However, in October 2017, Cricket South Africa initially postponed the tournament until November 2018, with it being cancelled soon after.

In September 2018, Mokoena was named in Northern Cape's squad for the 2018 Africa T20 Cup. He made his Twenty20 debut for Northern Cape in the 2018 Africa T20 Cup on 14 September 2018. In April 2021, he was named in Northerns' squad, ahead of the 2021–22 cricket season in South Africa.
