= Lizaad Williams =

South African cricketer (born 1993)

Personal information
- Full name: Lizaad Buyron Williams
- Born: 1 October 1993 (age 33); Vredenburg, Western Cape Province, South Africa
- Nickname: Lizzo
- Batting: Left-handed
- Bowling: Right arm medium-fast
- Role: Bowler

International information
- National side: South Africa (2021–present)
- Test debut (cap 353): 31 March 2022 v Bangladesh
- Last Test: 8 April 2022 v Bangladesh
- ODI debut (cap 140): 16 July 2021 v Ireland
- Last ODI: 4 November 2025 v Pakistan
- T20I debut (cap 92): 10 April 2021 v Pakistan
- Last T20I: 1 November 2025 v Pakistan

Domestic team information
- Years: Team
- 2010/11–2019/20: Boland
- 2012/13–2019/20: Cape Cobras
- 2014/15–2015/16: Western Province
- 2018: Nelson Mandela Bay Giants
- 2018/19: Lions
- 2019: Jozi Stars
- 2020/21: Titans
- 2021/22–present: Northerns
- 2022: Northamptonshire
- 2023: Joburg Super Kings
- 2024: Delhi Capitals

Career statistics
Competition	Test	ODI	T20I	FC
Matches	2	10	20	81
Runs scored	25	19	14	1,077
Batting average	8.33	4.75	2.33	14.95
100s/50s	0/0	0/0	0/0	0/3
Top score	13	13	5	83*
Balls bowled	185	489	389	11,645
Wickets	3	21	24	237
Bowling average	35.00	23.80	25.95	29.22
5 wickets in innings	0	0	0	7
10 wickets in match	0	0	0	1
Best bowling	3/54	4/32	3/35	7/75
Catches/stumpings	4/–	1/–	5/–	38/–
- Source: ESPNcricinfo, 2 October 2026

Lizaad Buyron Williams (born 1 October 1993) is a South African cricketer who plays for Northerns. He made his international debut for South Africa in April 2021.

== Career ==
Williams, who bowls right-arm fast was signed up with a rookie contract for the 2012–13 season after displays for Boland in List A cricket. In August 2017, he was named in Stellenbosch Monarchs' squad for the first season of the T20 Global League. However, in October 2017, Cricket South Africa initially postponed the tournament until November 2018, with it being cancelled soon after.

In June 2018, Williams was named in the squad for the Cape Cobras team for the 2018–19 season. In September 2018, he was named in Boland's squad for the 2018 Africa T20 Cup. In October 2018, he was named in Nelson Mandela Bay Giants' squad for the first edition of the Mzansi Super League T20 tournament. In September 2019, he was named in the squad for the Jozi Stars team for the 2019 Mzansi Super League tournament. Later the same month, he was named in Boland's squad for the 2019–20 CSA Provincial T20 Cup.

In March 2021, Williams was named in South Africa's limited overs squads for their series against Pakistan. He made his Twenty20 International (T20I) debut for South Africa, against Pakistan, on 10 April 2021. Later the same month, he was named in Northerns' squad, ahead of the 2021–22 cricket season in South Africa. In May 2021, Williams was named in South Africa's Test squad for their series against the West Indies.

In May 2021, Williams was named in South Africa's One Day International (ODI) squad for their series against Ireland. He made his ODI debut on 16 July 2021, for South Africa against Ireland, and took a wicket with his first delivery. In September 2021, Williams was named among three reserve players in South Africa's squad for the 2021 ICC Men's T20 World Cup.

In March 2022, Williams was named in South Africa's Test squad for their series against Bangladesh. He made his Test debut on 31 March 2022, for South Africa against Bangladesh. He got his first test wicket against Bangladesh. In 2023, he was named in South Africa's squad for the 50-over World Cup in India.
