= Beuran Hendricks =

South African cricketer (born 1990)

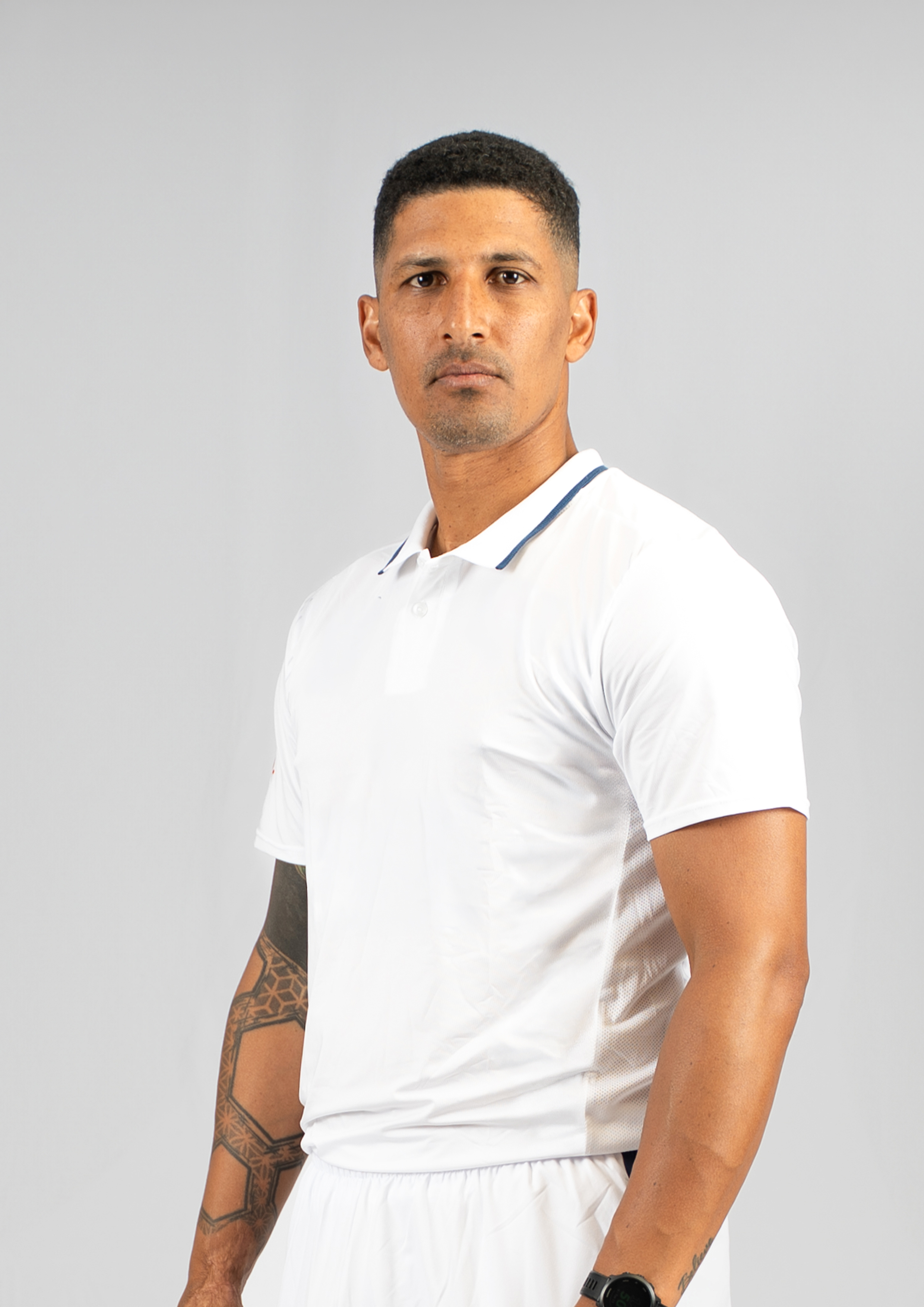

Personal information
- Full name: Beuran Eric Hendricks
- Born: 8 June 1990 (age 36); Cape Town, Cape Province, South Africa
- Height: 1.94 m (6 ft 4 in)
- Batting: Left-handed
- Bowling: Left-arm fast-medium
- Role: Bowler

International information
- National side: South Africa (2014–2023)
- Only Test (cap 345): 24 January 2020 v England
- ODI debut (cap 132): 25 January 2019 v Pakistan
- Last ODI: 21 December 2023 v India
- ODI shirt no.: 14
- T20I debut (cap 60): 12 March 2014 v Australia
- Last T20I: 24 July 2021 v Ireland
- T20I shirt no.: 14

Domestic team information
- Years: Team
- 2009/10–present: Western Province
- 2010/11–2016/17: Cape Cobras
- 2014–2015: Kings XI Punjab
- 2016/17–2020/21: Imperial Lions
- 2017/18: Gauteng
- 2018: Jozi Stars
- 2019: Nelson Mandela Bay Giants
- 2022: Leicestershire
- 2023–2024: MI Cape Town
- 2025: Joburg Super Kings

Career statistics
Competition	Test	ODI	T20I	FC
Matches	1	10	19	123
Runs scored	9	24	18	1,188
Batting average	9.00	8.00	6.00	11.42
100s/50s	0/0	0/0	0/0	0/2
Top score	5*	18	12*	81
Balls bowled	231	386	409	17,751
Wickets	6	10	25	385
Bowling average	29.16	34.60	25.08	25.25
5 wickets in innings	1	0	0	20
10 wickets in match	0	0	0	2
Best bowling	5/64	3/59	4/14	7/29
Catches/stumpings	0/–	4/–	4/–	33/–
- Source: ESPNcricinfo, 13 April 2025

Beuran Eric Hendricks (born 8 June 1990) is a South African cricketer who plays as a left-arm fast-medium bowler and left-handed batter for Western Province. He made his international debut for South Africa in March 2014.

== Domestic career ==
Following a superb 2012/13 first-class season taking 35 wickets in 7 matches, Hendricks has boosted his chances for an international call-up. His winter performances for South Africa A culminated in a match-winning 11-wicket haul against India A in Pretoria which earned him a call for the IPL where he will be representing Kings XI Punjab for a price of Rs 1.8 crore.

In August 2017, he was named in Bloem City Blazers' squad for the first season of the T20 Global League. However, in October 2017, Cricket South Africa initially postponed the tournament until November 2018, with it being cancelled soon after.

In June 2018, he was named in the squad for the Highveld Lions team for the 2018–19 season. In October 2018, he was named in Jozi Stars' squad for the first edition of the Mzansi Super League T20 tournament.

He was the leading wicket-taker for Lions in the 2018–19 CSA 4-Day Franchise Series, with 32 dismissals in eight matches. In September 2019, he was named in the squad for the Nelson Mandela Bay Giants team for the 2019 Mzansi Super League tournament. He was released by the Mumbai Indians ahead of the 2020 IPL auction.

In April 2021, he was named in Western Province's squad, ahead of the 2021–22 cricket season in South Africa.

== International career ==
Hendricks made his Twenty20 International (T20I) debut in the second match against Australia in Durban on 12 March 2014.

In January 2019, he was added to South Africa's One Day International (ODI) squad for the last three matches against Pakistan. He made his ODI debut for South Africa against Pakistan on 25 January 2019.

On 4 June 2019, Hendricks was added to South Africa's squad for the 2019 Cricket World Cup. He replaced Dale Steyn, who was ruled out of the tournament due to an ongoing shoulder injury. In December 2019, he was named in South Africa's Test squad for their series against England. He made his Test debut for South Africa, against England, on 24 January 2020. In the second innings, he took a five-wicket haul, to become the 24th bowler for South Africa to take five wickets on Test debut. In March 2020, he was awarded with a national contract by Cricket South Africa ahead of the 2020–21 season.
