= Alfred Mothoa =

South African cricketer (born 1989)

Personal information
- Born: 16 December 1989 (age 36); Hammanskraal, South Africa

Domestic team information
- Years: Team
- 2018-present: Jozi Stars
- Source: Cricinfo, 13 September 2019

Alfred Mothoa (born 16 December 1989) is a South African cricketer. He was included in the Northerns cricket team for the 2015 Africa T20 Cup. In June 2018, he was named in the squad for the Titans team for the 2018–19 season.

In September 2018, he was named in the Titans' squad for the 2018 Abu Dhabi T20 Trophy. The following month, he was named in Jozi Stars' squad for the first edition of the Mzansi Super League T20 tournament. He was the joint-leading wicket-taker for Titans in the 2018–19 CSA 4-Day Franchise Series, with 21 dismissals in eight matches.

In September 2019, he was named in Limpopo's squad for the 2019–20 CSA Provincial T20 Cup. In April 2021, he was named in Free State's squad, ahead of the 2021–22 cricket season in South Africa.
