= Dan Christian =

Australian cricketer (born 1983)

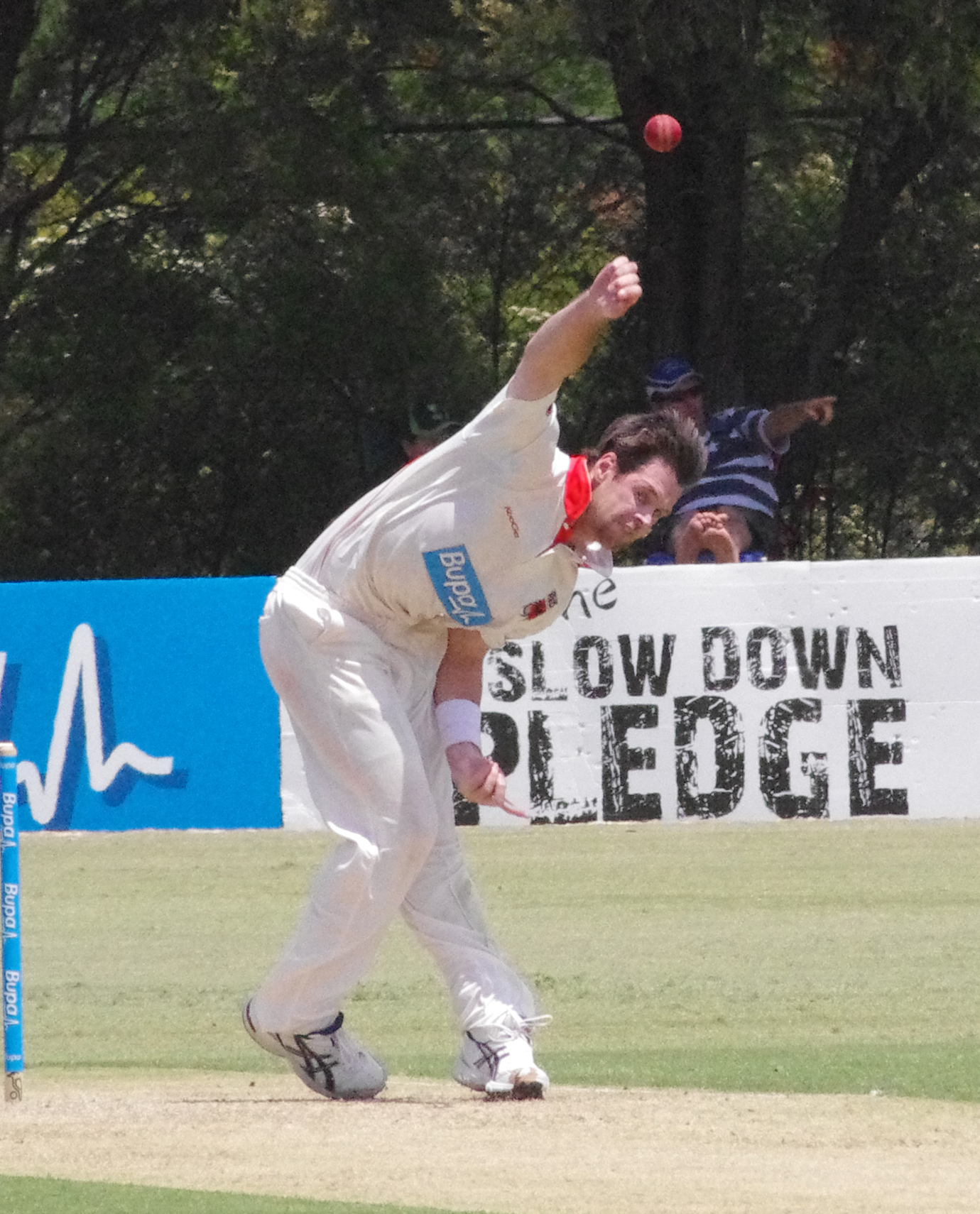

Personal information
- Full name: Daniel Trevor Christian
- Born: 4 May 1983 (age 43); Narrandera, New South Wales, Australia
- Nickname: DC
- Batting: Right-handed
- Bowling: Right-arm fast-medium
- Role: All-rounder

International information
- National side: Australia (2010–2021)
- ODI debut (cap 191): 5 February 2012 v India
- Last ODI: 26 July 2021 v West Indies
- ODI shirt no.: 54
- T20I debut (cap 44): 23 February 2010 v West Indies
- Last T20I: 9 August 2021 v Bangladesh
- T20I shirt no.: 54

Domestic team information
- Years: Team
- 2005/06–2006/07 (Note: Only teams Christian has played for in more than one season are listed here.): New South Wales
- 2007/08–2012/13: South Australia
- 2011–2012: Deccan Chargers
- 2011/12–2014/15: Brisbane Heat
- 2013, 2021: Royal Challengers Bangalore
- 2013/14–2017/18: Victoria
- 2015–2020, 2022: Nottinghamshire
- 2015/16–2017/18: Hobart Hurricanes
- 2018–2019: Jozi Stars
- 2018/19–2019/20: Melbourne Renegades
- 2020/21–2022/23: Sydney Sixers

Career statistics
Competition	ODI	T20I	LA	T20
Matches	20	23	120	399
Runs scored	273	118	2,844	5,778
Batting average	21.00	14.75	32.68	23.01
100s/50s	0/0	0/0	2/14	2/17
Top score	39	39*	117	129
Balls bowled	727	279	3,896	5,721
Wickets	20	13	107	277
Bowling average	29.75	30.61	33.50	29.11
5 wickets in innings	1	0	3	2
10 wickets in match	0	0	0	0
Best bowling	5/31	3/27	6/48	5/14
Catches/stumpings	10/–	6/–	43/–	182/–
- Source: ESPNcricinfo, 30 December 2022

Daniel Trevor Christian (born 4 May 1983) is an Australian professional cricketer with Aboriginal ancestry. He was considered a Twenty20 specialist and played for franchises all over the globe. Christian is known as a powerful hitter and a useful medium pacer. ESPNcricinfo's Peter English described him as a "natural all-rounder". He is seen as a cricket role model for Australia's indigenous population.

== Early life ==
Born in 1983, Christian grew up in the town of Narrandera in the Riverina region of New South Wales and is of British, Irish Catholic and Australian Indigenous Wiradjuri ancestry. He lived in Narrandera until the age of 13 when he moved to Sydney to attend St Gregory's College, Campbelltown.

== Cricket career ==
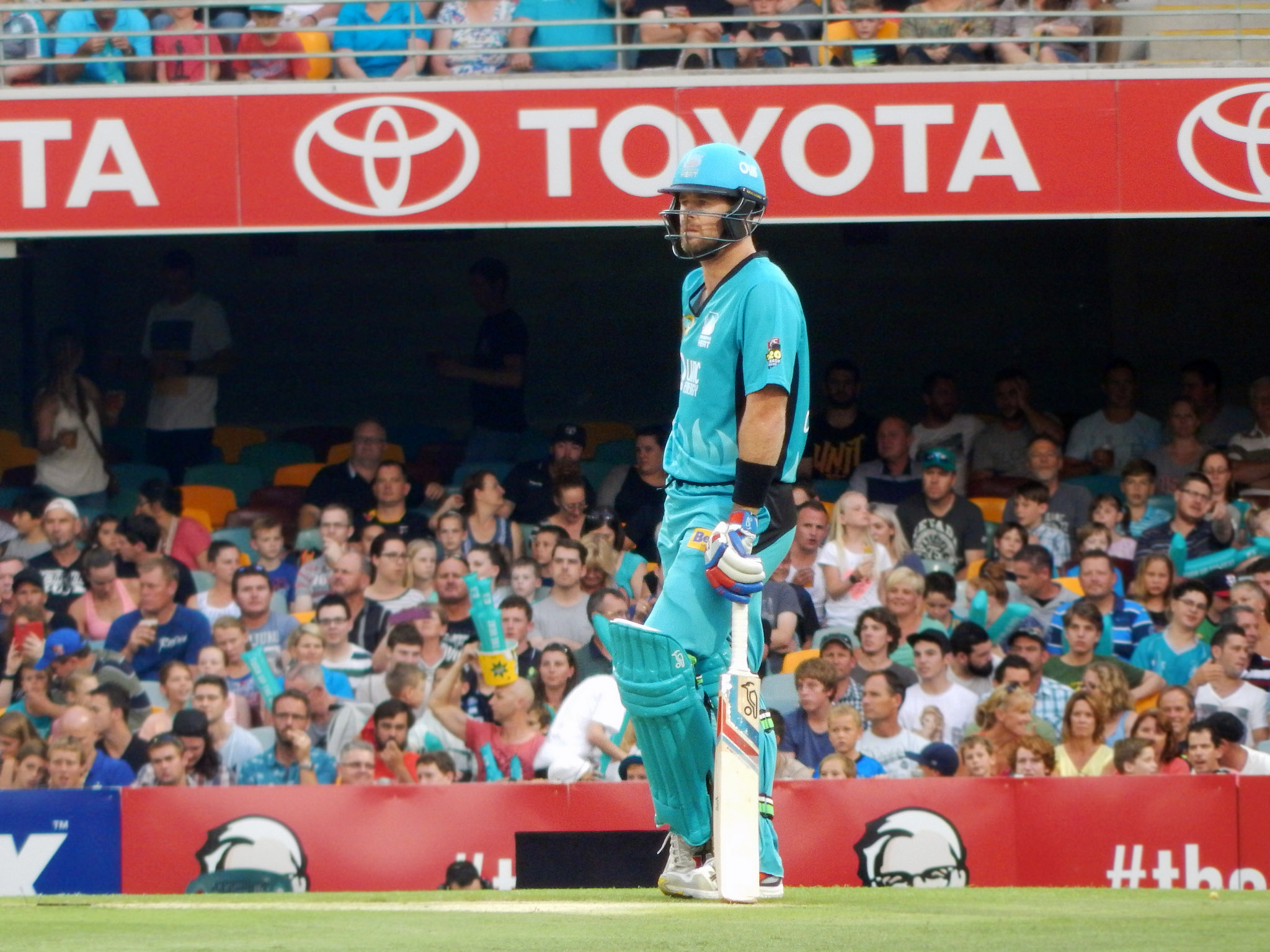
Dan Christian during a BBL match in 2014

In 2003, Christian attended the Australian Cricket Academy.

Christian played List A cricket for New South Wales in 2006 and 2007. After he was not offered a new contract for the 2007–08 season, he moved to South Australia where he soon found himself playing first-class cricket for the state team.

In 2009, Christian captained an Indigenous Australian cricket team that toured England. ESPNcricinfo noted that "With the bat Christian can be brutal, particularly when aiming at Adelaide's square boundaries, and he is one of those rare strikers whose eyes don't need a warm-up ball." He was brought into Australia's Twenty20 team "following a series of brutal, clever and consistent performances."

In February 2010, he made his Twenty20 International debut against the West Indies. The following month, he was selected as a member of Australia's squad for the 2010 ICC World Twenty20 tournament.

Christian played for Hampshire in their victorious 2010 Twenty20 Cup campaign.

Additionally, Christian was a part of the Deccan Charger’s team which competed annually in the DLF IPL - he was purchased for US$900,000.

On 2 March 2012, he took figures of 5/31 which included a hat-trick in an ODI match against Sri Lanka at the MCG. Despite his impressive figures, Australia were unable to win the match.

He was picked up by the Royal Challengers Bangalore for a sum of US$100,000, and joined them for their IPL-6 campaign.

In 2013, Christian signed for the English team Gloucestershire Gladiators to play in the 2013 Twenty20 Cup, although he did play a first-class game for Gloucestershire against Australia A. The following year he signed for Middlesex Panthers to play in the 2014 t20 Blast, a spell which included an innings against Kent of 129, which included ten sixes and to date is the highest score by a batsman in a T20 game at the St. Lawrence Ground.

In 2015, Christian signed for his 4th English County, Nottinghamshire in a spell that would bring both him and the club great success in the t20 Blast competition.

In February 2017, he was bought by Rising Pune Supergiants team for the 2017 Indian Premier League. In January 2018, he was bought by the Delhi Daredevils in the 2018 IPL auction.

During the summer of 2018, he scored his first T20 hundred for the Notts Outlaws against Northamptonshire posting a record score at the County Ground in the process.

In October 2018, he was named in Jozi Stars' squad for the first edition of the Mzansi Super League T20 tournament. In July 2019, he was selected to play for the Dublin Chiefs in the inaugural edition of the Euro T20 Slam cricket tournament. However, the following month the tournament was cancelled.

In September 2019, he was named in the squad for the Jozi Stars team for the 2019 Mzansi Super League tournament. Christian led the Notts Outlaws to victory in the 2020 T20 Blast competition with a man of the match performance.

In November 2020, he was picked by Karachi Kings for Pakistan Super League. He played the first few matches but withdrew from tournament in March 2021 due to a COVID-19 outbreak. Before that he had played for Multan Sultans in the PSL 2019.

In February 2021, Christian was bought by the Royal Challengers Bangalore in the IPL auction ahead of the 2021 Indian Premier League.

On 8 August 2021, Christian scored 30 runs off an over bowled by left-arm spinner Shakib Al Hasan as part of a 15-ball 39 scored against Bangladesh, to become the first Australian to hit five sixes in a single over of a T20 international. Later the same month, Christian was named as one of three players as injury cover in Australia's squad for the 2021 ICC Men's T20 World Cup.

In early January 2025, Christian came out of retirement to join the Sydney Thunder for the rest of the 2024–25 Big Bash League season. He had been serving as Thunder's assistant coach over the previous two seasons and answered a late call-up to bolster the team amid a mounting injury toll.

== Books ==
In 2022 he wrote The All-rounder - The inside story of big time cricket with Gideon Haigh about his exploits in cricket during 2021 with RCB, Australia and in the Hundred.
