= Rassie van der Dussen =

South African cricketer

Personal information
- Full name: Hendrik Erasmus van der Dussen
- Born: 7 February 1989 (age 37); Pretoria, Gauteng, South Africa
- Height: 6 ft 2 in (188 cm)
- Batting: Right-handed
- Bowling: Right arm leg break
- Role: Top-order batter

International information
- National side: South Africa (2018–2025)
- Test debut (cap 342): 26 December 2019 v England
- Last Test: 17 December 2022 v Australia
- ODI debut (cap 131): 19 January 2019 v Pakistan
- Last ODI: 5 March 2025 v New Zealand
- ODI shirt no.: 72
- T20I debut (cap 78): 9 October 2018 v Zimbabwe
- Last T20I: 16 August 2025 v Australia
- T20I shirt no.: 72

Domestic team information
- Years: Team
- 2007/08–2011/12: Northerns
- 2011/12–2016/17: North West
- 2012/13–present: Lions
- 2018: St Kitts and Nevis Patriots
- 2018–2019: Jozi Stars
- 2021/22–present: Gauteng
- 2022: Rajasthan Royals
- 2022/23–present: MI Cape Town
- 2023: 2025: Islamabad United
- 2024: Lahore Qalandars

Career statistics
Competition	Test	ODI	T20I	FC
Matches	18	71	57	138
Runs scored	905	2,657	1,406	8,546
Batting average	30.16	50.13	33.47	41.08
100s/50s	0/6	6/17	0/10	17/47
Top score	98	134	94*	175
Catches/stumpings	23/–	30/–	23/–	93/–
- Source: ESPNcricinfo, 16 August 2025

Hendrik Erasmus "Rassie" van der Dussen (born 7 February 1989) is a South African professional cricketer who represents the South Africa national cricket team and plays for Gauteng in domestic cricket. In the 2018 South African Cricket Annual, he was named as one of the five Cricketers of the Year.

In August 2019, van der Dussen was named the International Men's Newcomer of the Year at Cricket South Africa's annual award ceremony. Later the same month, Cricket South Africa awarded him with a central contract for the 2019–20 season.

== Domestic career ==
In August 2017, van der Dussen was named in Cape Town Knight Riders' squad for the first season of the T20 Global League. However, in October 2017, Cricket South Africa initially postponed the tournament until November 2018, with it being cancelled soon after.

Van der Dussen was the leading run-scorer during the 2017–18 Sunfoil Series, with 959 runs in ten matches. He was the joint-leading run-scorer in the 2018–19 CSA T20 Challenge tournament, with 348 runs in ten matches. In April 2021, he was named in Gauteng's squad, ahead of the 2021–22 cricket season in South Africa.

=== T20 franchise career ===
On 3 June 2018, van der Dussen was selected to play for the Vancouver Knights in the players' draft for the inaugural edition of the Global T20 Canada tournament. He was the leading run-scorer in the tournament for the Vancouver Knights, with 255 runs in eight matches. In the same month, he was named in the squad for the Highveld Lions team for the 2018–19 season.

In October 2018, van der Dussen was named in Jozi Stars' squad for the first edition of the Mzansi Super League T20 tournament. In June 2019, he was selected to play for the Vancouver Knights franchise team in the 2019 Global T20 Canada tournament. In September 2019, he was named in the squad for the Jozi Stars team for the 2019 Mzansi Super League tournament. In December 2019, he was picked by Islamabad United in the supplementary round of the 2020 Pakistan Super League players draft as their last pick.

In July 2020, van der Dussen was named in the St Kitts & Nevis Patriots squad for the 2020 Caribbean Premier League. However, van der Dussen was one of five South African cricketers to miss the tournament, after failing to confirm travel arrangements in due time. In February 2022, he was bought by the Rajasthan Royals in the auction for the 2022 Indian Premier League tournament. In 2024, Van der Dussen was signed to play in the Pakistani Super League, for the Lahore Qalandars.

== International career ==
In September 2018, van der Dussen was named in South Africa's Twenty20 International (T20I) series against Zimbabwe. He made his T20I debut for South Africa against Zimbabwe on 9 October 2018. In January 2019, he was named in South Africa's One Day International (ODI) squad for their series against Pakistan. He made his ODI debut for South Africa against Pakistan on 19 January 2019. During his debut, van der Dussen came within just seven runs of scoring a maiden ODI century on debut before he fell for 93. He followed this with an unbeaten 80 at Kingsmead Stadium three days later. He finished the series with 241 runs, averaging 120.5, across the five ODIs.

Van der Dussen was then retained for the ODI series against Sri Lanka in March 2019. He scored 112 runs across four ODIs including one fifty and finished the series with an average of 56. In April 2019, he was named in South Africa's squad for the 2019 Cricket World Cup. In December 2019, he was named in South Africa's Test squad for their series against England. He made his Test debut for South Africa, against England, on 26 December 2019. In March 2020, he was awarded with a national contract by Cricket South Africa ahead of the 2020–21 season.

In April 2021, in the first match against Pakistan, van der Dussen scored his first century in an ODI, with 123 not out. At the age of 32 years and 54 days, he also became the oldest cricketer for South Africa to score his first century in an ODI match. In September 2021, van der Dussen was named in South Africa's squad for the 2021 ICC Men's T20 World Cup, where he scored his highest T20I score of 94* against England.

Van der Dussen was also named in the South Africa squad for the 2023 ICC Men's Cricket World Cup Tournament in India, where he scored 108 in the first match against Sri Lanka.

In February 2025, van der Dussen was named in the South Africa squad for the 2025 ICC Champions Trophy.

In April 2026, van der Dussen announced his retirement from international cricket.

== Achievements ==
- In the annual ICC Awards in January 2022, he was named in ICC Men's ODI Team of the Year for the year 2021.

== International centuries ==
ODI centuries by Rassie van der Dussen
No.	Runs	Balls	Innings	Against	Venue	Country	Date	Result
1	123*	134	1	Pakistan	Centurion Park, Centurion	South Africa	2 April 2021	Pakistan won by 3 wickets
2	129*	96	1	India	Boland Park, Paarl	South Africa	19 January 2022	South Africa won by 31 runs
3	134	117	1	England	Riverside Ground, Chester-le-Street	England	19 July 2022	South Africa won by 62 runs
4	111	117	1	England	Mangaung Oval, Bloemfontein	South Africa	27 January 2023	South Africa won by 27 runs
5	108	110	1	Sri Lanka	Arun Jaitley Cricket Stadium, Delhi	India	7 October 2023	South Africa won by 102 runs
6	133	118	1	New Zealand	Maharashtra Cricket Association Stadium, Pune	India	1 November 2023	South Africa won by 190 runs
