= Sinethemba Qeshile =

South African cricketer

Personal information
- Full name: Sinethemba Qeshile
- Born: 10 February 1999 (age 27); East London, Eastern Cape, South Africa
- Batting: Right-handed
- Role: Wicket-keeper-batter

International information
- National side: South Africa (2019–present)
- ODI debut (cap 164): 4 November 2025 v Pakistan
- Last ODI: 6 November 2025 v Pakistan
- T20I debut (cap 82): 22 March 2019 v Sri Lanka
- Last T20I: 24 March 2019 v Sri Lanka

Domestic team information
- Years: Team
- 2017/18: Border
- 2017/18–2020/21: Warriors
- 2019: Jozi Stars
- 2021/22–present: Eastern Province

Career statistics
Competition	T20I	FC	LA	T20
Matches	2	36	41	44
Runs scored	–	1,842	847	434
Batting average	–	36.84	25.66	16.07
100s/50s	–	1/13	1/6	0/0
Top score	–	124*	121*	47*
Catches/stumpings	3/0	19/0	8/0	7/1
- Source: ESPNcricinfo, 2 January 2023

Sinethemba Qeshile (born 10 February 1999) is a South African cricketer. He made his international debut for the South Africa cricket team in March 2019.

== Domestic career ==
He made his List A debut for Border in the 2017–18 CSA Provincial One-Day Challenge on 21 January 2018. He made his first-class debut for Border in the 2017–18 Sunfoil 3-Day Cup on 15 February 2018.

In August 2018, he was awarded a senior contract by Cricket South Africa ahead of the 2018–19 domestic season. In October 2018, he was named in Jozi Stars' squad for the first edition of the Mzansi Super League T20 tournament.

In August 2019, he was named the Domestic Newcomer of the Season at Cricket South Africa's annual award ceremony. In September 2019, he was named in the squad for the Jozi Stars team for the 2019 Mzansi Super League tournament. In April 2021, he was named in Eastern Province's squad, ahead of the 2021–22 cricket season in South Africa.

In February 2022, Qeshile was named as the captain of the Warriors for the 2021–22 CSA T20 Challenge.

== International career ==
In March 2019, he was named in South Africa's Twenty20 International (T20I) squad for the series against Sri Lanka. He made his T20I debut for South Africa against Sri Lanka on 22 March 2019.

In April 2021, Qeshile was named in the South Africa Emerging Men's squad for their six-match tour of Namibia.
