= Chris Gayle =

Jamaican cricketer (born 1979)

Chris Gayle OD
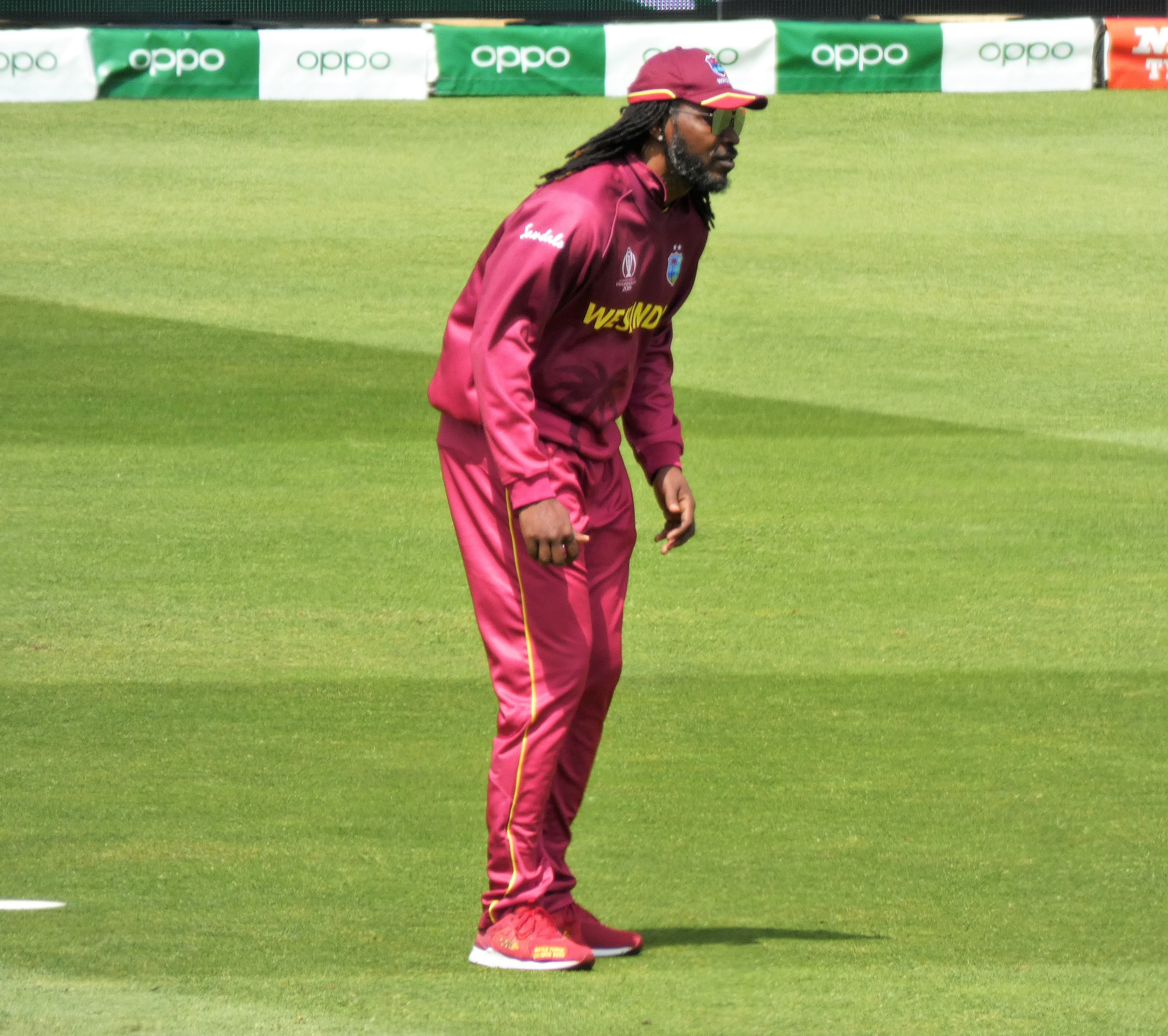
- Gayle during 2019 Cricket World Cup

Personal information
- Full name: Christopher Henry Gayle
- Born: 21 September 1979 (age 47); Kingston, Jamaica
- Height: 6 ft 3 in (191 cm)
- Batting: Left-handed
- Bowling: Right-arm off-break
- Role: All-rounder

International information
- National side: West Indies (1999–2021)
- Test debut (cap 230): 16 March 2000 v Zimbabwe
- Last Test: 5 September 2014 v Bangladesh
- ODI debut (cap 97): 11 September 1999 v India
- Last ODI: 14 August 2019 v India
- ODI shirt no.: 45
- T20I debut (cap 6): 16 February 2006 v New Zealand
- Last T20I: 6 November 2021 v Australia

Domestic team information
- Years: Team
- 1998/99–2018/19: Jamaica (Note: Only clubs that Gayle has played for more than one season are included in this list.)
- 2009–2010: Kolkata Knight Riders
- 2009/10–2010/11: Western Australia
- 2011–2017: Royal Challengers Bangalore
- 2011/12–2012/13: Sydney Thunder
- 2012–2022: Fortune Barishal
- 2013–2016, 2019: Jamaica Tallawahs
- 2015–2016: Somerset
- 2017–2018, 2021: St Kitts and Nevis Patriots
- 2017–2019: Rangpur Riders
- 2018–2021: Punjab Kings
- 2018–2019: Jozi Stars

Career statistics
Competition	Test	ODI	T20I	FC
Matches	103	301	79	180
Runs scored	7,214	10,480	1,899	13,226
Batting average	42.18	37.83	27.92	44.83
100s/50s	15/37	25/54	2/14	32/64
Top score	333	215	117	333
Balls bowled	7,109	7,424	381	12,511
Wickets	73	167	20	132
Bowling average	42.73	35.48	22.00	39.34
5 wickets in innings	2	1	0	2
10 wickets in match	0	0	0	0
Best bowling	5/34	5/46	2/15	5/34
Catches/stumpings	96/–	124/–	20/–	158/–
Medal record
Men's Cricket
Representing West Indies
ICC Champions Trophy
Winner	2004 England
Runner-up	2006 India
ICC Men's T20 World Cup
Winner	2012 Sri Lanka
Winner	2016 India
- Source: ESPNcricinfo, 6 November 2021

Christopher Henry Gayle OD (born 21 September 1979) is a former Jamaican cricketer who played international cricket for the West Indies from 1999 to 2021. Gayle is widely regarded as the greatest Twenty20 batsman in the history of cricket. He played a crucial role in the West Indies teams that won the 2004 ICC Champions Trophy, 2012 ICC World Twenty20 and 2016 ICC World Twenty20.

He has set numerous records across all three formats of the game. He is the most capped player for the West Indies in international cricket and is one of only two players (along with Harry Brook) to score a triplet of centuries – a triple hundred in Tests, double hundred in ODIs and a hundred in T20Is. Gayle was the first player to score more than 14,000 runs and hit more than 1,000 sixes in T20 cricket. He is also the leading run scorer for West Indies in both ODIs and T20Is and, after Brian Lara, was the second player to score more than 10,000 runs for West Indies in ODI Cricket. Gayle was the first West Indian batsman to score a double-century in ODI cricket and subsequently in the history of World Cup cricket, where he scored an innings of 215 against Zimbabwe. His innings of 215 is currently the highest individual score by a left-handed batsman in ODI cricket. Along with the ODI record, he has the highest individual score in the T20 World Cup as a West Indian with his 117 runs against South Africa. Moreover, in the ICC Champions Trophy, he has the highest score made by a West Indian with his innings of 133 not out against South Africa in the 2006 tournament. In addition to his batting, Gayle has picked up over 200 international wickets with his right-arm off-break spin bowling. He was awarded the Most Valuable Player in the 2011 Indian Premier League and held the Orange Cap in 2012. On 23 April 2013, he broke the record for the fastest ever T20 hundred in his landmark knock of 175 runs from 66 balls for Royal Challengers Bangalore against Pune Warriors India in the IPL, which is also the second highest score ever by a batsman in T20 history. He also equaled the record for the fastest 50 in T20 cricket while playing for Melbourne Renegades in the Big Bash League.

Playing Tests, Gayle scored over 7,000 runs at an average of over 42 and captained the West Indian Test team from 2007 to 2010. He last played in a Test match in September 2014, against Bangladesh. After initially expressing his desire to retire from ODIs after the 2019 Cricket World Cup, he nonetheless played in the ODI series against India after the World Cup playing his final and 301st ODI match wearing the special jersey number 301 in August 2019, against India. In December 2020, Gayle was included in the ICC T20I Team of the Decade.

In September 2021, he was included in the West Indies squad for 2021 ICC Men's T20 World Cup.

== Early career ==
Gayle started his cricket career with Lucas Cricket Club in Kingston, Jamaica. Gayle later said that "if it was not for Lucas, I don't know where I would be today. Maybe on the streets." Lucas Cricket Club's nursery has been named in honour of Gayle.

== International career ==
=== Debut years ===
Gayle first played at the international level as a youth where he topscored for the Windies at the 1998 Under-19 Cricket World Cup. He eventually made his first-class debut in 1998, at age 19 for Jamaica. He played his first One Day International eleven months later in 1999, and his first Test match six months after that. Gayle went on to establish himself as a destructive batsman who's most effective whilst playing square of the wicket. In July 2001, Gayle recorded his maiden Test century by scoring 175 against Zimbabwe at Queens Sports Club, Bulawayo. In partnership with Daren Ganga they added 214 to equal the record for opening stands against the host country.

=== Rise in ranks ===
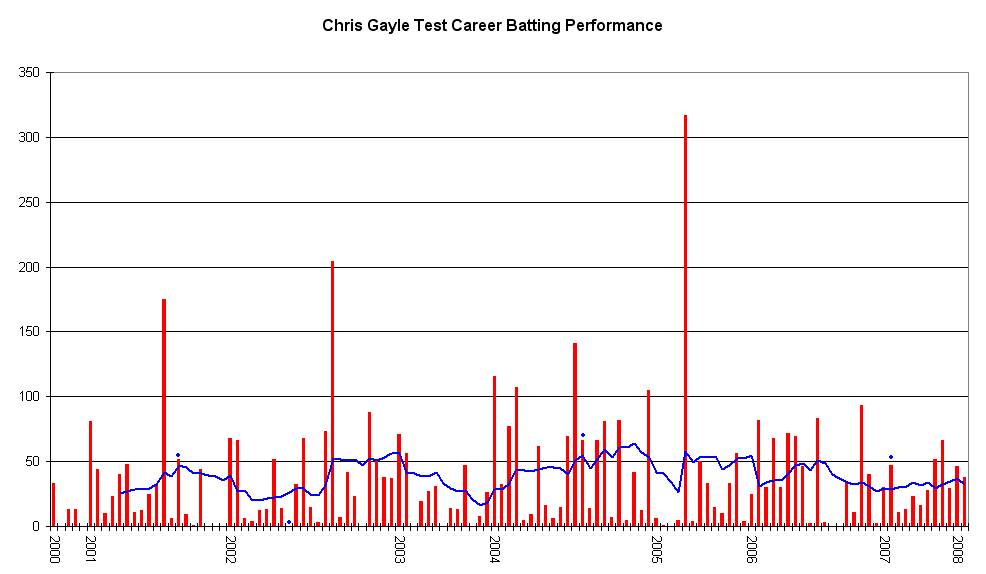
An innings-by-innings breakdown of Gayle's Test match batting career up until 2008, showing runs scored (red bars) and the average of the last ten innings (blue line).

Gayle had a slow start to his international career, but invigorated it in 2002, ending the year with three centuries against India in November and becoming the third West Indian to score over 1,000 runs in a calendar year, along with Vivian Richards and Brian Lara. He is one of only six players in One Day International history to have three or more scores of 150. In 2005, Gayle was dropped for the first Test against South Africa along with six other players following a dispute over sponsorship issues (see below). He returned for the second Test but had a poor series until the fourth Test, where he made a match-saving 317. It was the first-ever triple century against South Africa and up until Mahela Jayawardene made 374, it was the highest individual Test score against them. In another match of the series, Gayle had to leave the field after complaining of dizziness. During a subsequent series against Australia, Gayle again complained of dizziness and shortness of breath during his innings. He left the field for a time, and was after the match sent to hospital where he was diagnosed with a congenital heart defect causing a cardiac dysrhythmia. He underwent heart surgery following the series to correct the defect. Gayle was only the fourth West Indian to carry his bat in a Test innings.

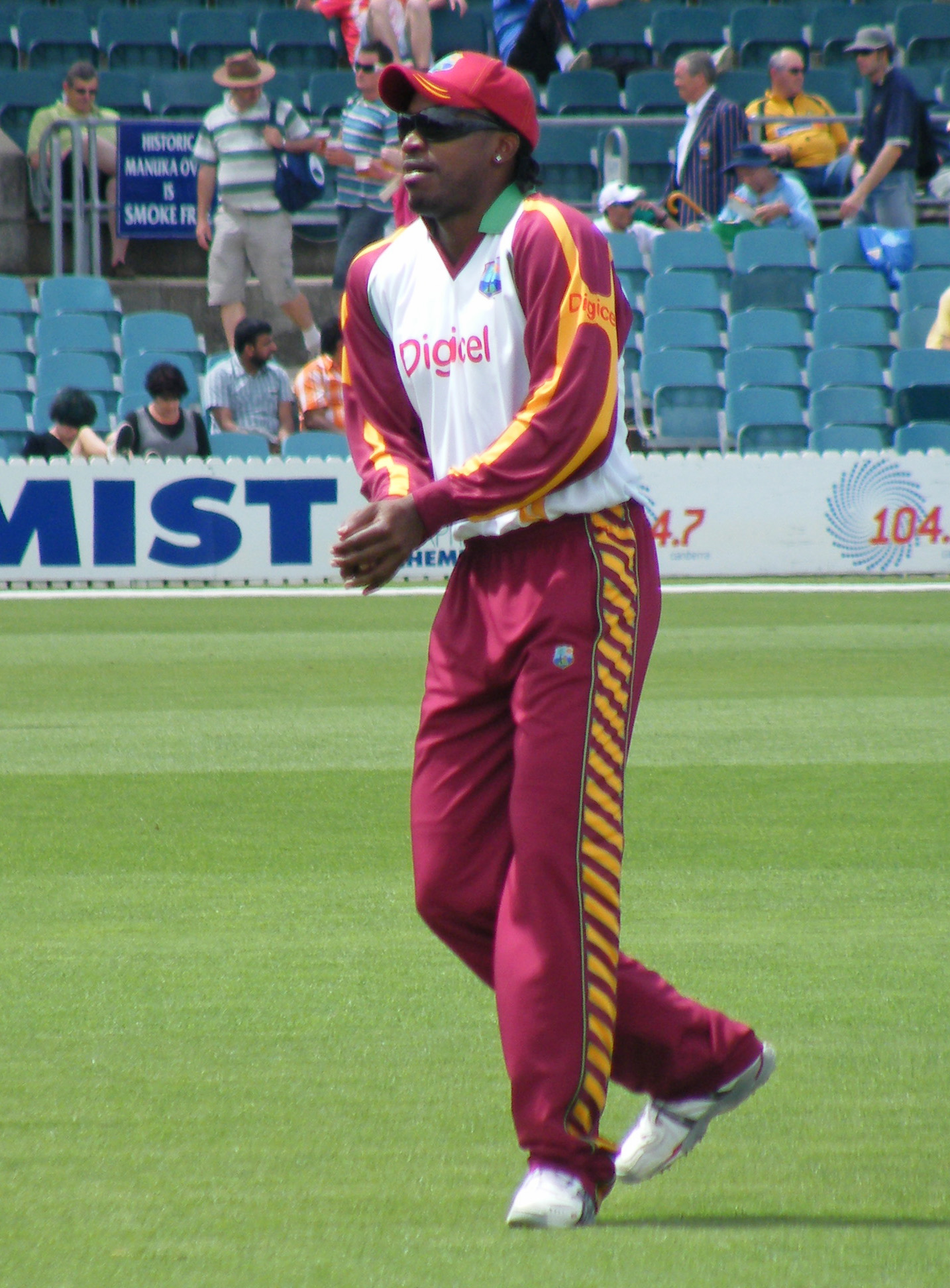
Gayle at the Prime Ministers XI cricket match in Canberra in 2010

In August 2005, Gayle joined Worcestershire for the rest of the English season, playing eight matches. He made two half-centuries in three first-class matches and two half-centuries in five one-day matches, and won one Man of the Match award in the one-day National League. However, Worcestershire were relegated after Gayle made 1 in the final match against Lancashire.

Gayle was named Player of the 2006 Champions Trophy, where the West Indies nearly defended the title they won in 2004, being defeated in the final by Australia. Gayle scored three centuries and totalled 474 runs, 150 more than any other batsman, and also took eight wickets in as many matches. Gayle, in keeping with the rest of the West Indies team, had a poor World Cup in 2007. He recorded a series of low scores; the one exception being a blistering 79 off 58 balls against England in the West Indies' final match.

Gayle made the first century in international Twenty20 cricket, scoring 117 against South Africa in the first match of the 2007 World Twenty20. The innings made him the first batsman to score a century in each of international cricket's three formats. This stood alone as the record score in a T20I until 19 February 2012, when South Africa's Richard Levi scored 117n.o. against New Zealand, and was eventually exceeded by Brendon McCullum of New Zealand later that year.

In the semi-final match of the 2009 World Twenty20 against Sri Lanka, he became the first international player to carry his bat through the entire innings in this format of the game as well. In April 2008, Gayle was bought by the franchise Kolkata Knight Riders in the Indian Premier League player auction, but missed the opening games due to a Sri Lankan tour to the Caribbean. When he finally joined the team, he missed out on the action due to a groin injury he picked up during that tour. Afterwards, he left to join the West Indies team for a home series against Australia, therefore not playing in the inaugural version of the IPL.

He played in the second IPL competition in early 2009, arriving for an away Test series against England very late, earning criticism about his commitment. His Test series went poorly, and the West Indies went on to lose both the Test and ODI series. Gayle, however, went to on score a match winning 88 in the first official match of the 2009 Twenty20, in a surprise victory over Australia.

On 17 December 2009 in the Australia v West Indies 3rd Test Chris Gayle scored the then fifth-fastest century in Test match history, taking just 70 balls to reach 100, including nine fours and six sixes. He was dismissed two balls later for 102 runs. On 16 November 2010, he became the fourth cricketer to score two triple centuries in Test cricket after Donald Bradman, Brian Lara and Virender Sehwag.

On his return to Test cricket in July 2012, he scored 150 on the third day of the first Test against New Zealand.

Gayle scored 75 runs from 41 balls, fuelling West Indies' total of 205, against Australia in the 2012 ICC World Twenty20 semi-final, which was the highest total of the tournament.

In November 2012, during the First Test against Bangladesh in Dhaka, Gayle became the first player in the history of Test cricket to hit a six off the first ball of a match. In 2013, during the Third Test against Zimbabwe, Gayle surpassed Brian Lara's record of the most sixes in Test cricket by a West Indian cricketer.

=== Late career ===
In February 2015, Gayle became the fourth cricketer (and the first ever non-Indian) to score a double century in ODIs, and the first ever to do so in World Cup history, when he made 215 during a pool game against Zimbabwe in the 2015 ICC Cricket World Cup in Canberra. His partnership with Marlon Samuels was the most productive wicket in Cricket World Cup history, producing 372 runs before Gayle was caught for an out on the final ball of the innings. Coincidentally, he was almost adjudged out on the first ball he faced as an LBW appeal was raised by Zimbabwe bowler, Tinashe Panyangara, however, the umpire turned down the appeal. Despite a review which showed that the ball would have clipped the top of the bails, the original decision was upheld. Gayle thus became the only player in world cricket to hit a triple hundred in Tests, a double hundred in ODIs and a hundred in Twenty20 Internationals.

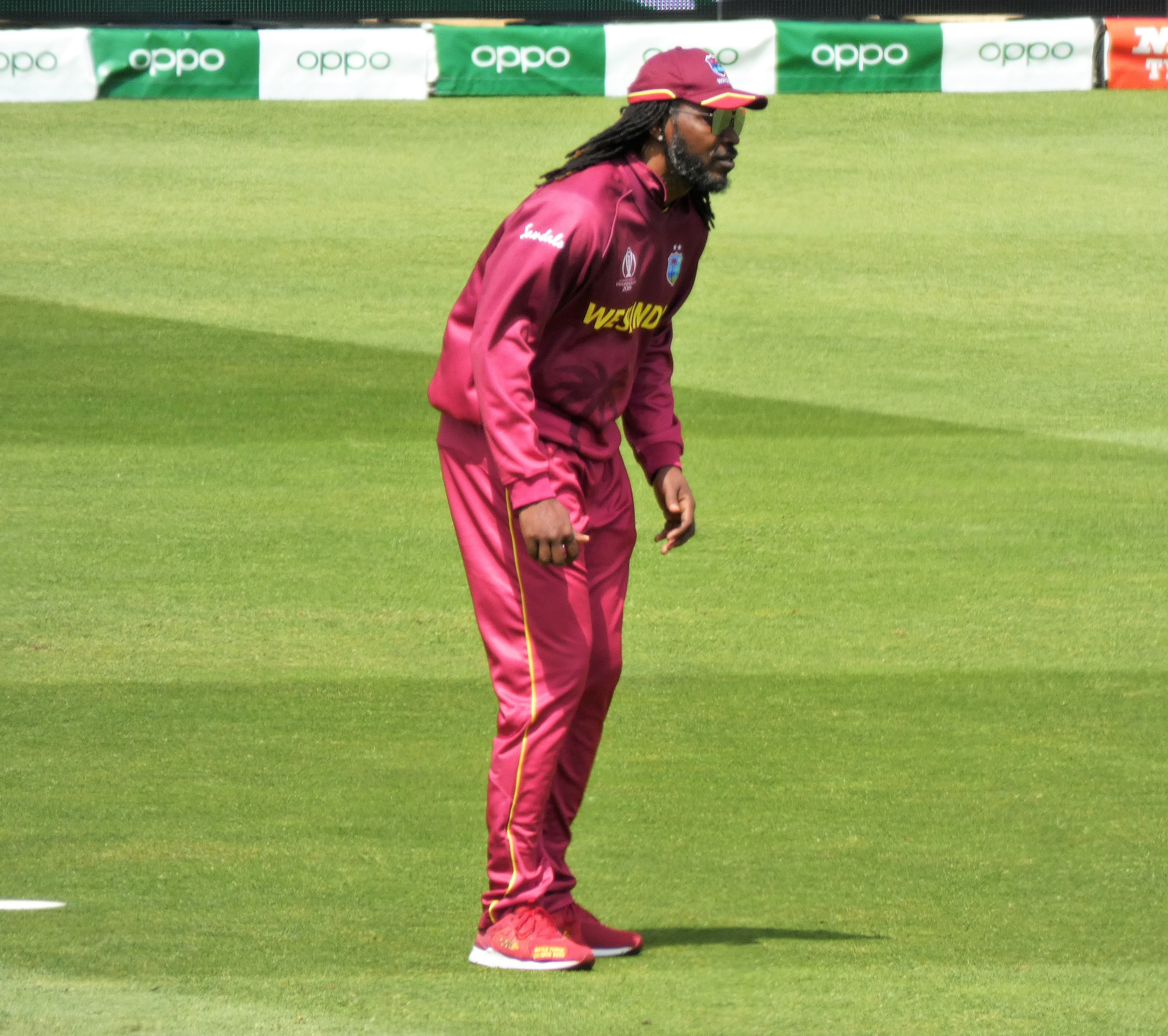
Gayle fielding against Australia during the 2019 Cricket World Cup

Chris Gayle ended his List-A career for Jamaica with a match-winning century against Barbados in a Super50 Cup 2018. On 18 February 2019, Gayle announced that he would retire from ODIs after the 2019 Cricket World Cup. He reversed this decision in June 2019.

In April 2019, he was named in the West Indies' squad for the 2019 Cricket World Cup, which marked his fifth consecutive World Cup appearance (2003, 2007, 2011, 2015, 2019). On 31 May 2019, in the West Indies' opening match of the World Cup, Gayle scored his 40th six in World Cup matches, the most by any batsman in World Cup history, surpassing AB de Villiers's record of 37. In the West Indies' match against Australia, Gayle scored his 1,000th run in the Cricket World Cup. On 1 July 2019, in the match against Sri Lanka, Gayle became the most capped player for the West Indies in international cricket, playing in his 455th match.

Three days later, in the West Indies' final match of the 2019 Cricket World Cup, against Afghanistan, Gayle became the most-capped player for the West Indies in the Cricket World Cup, playing in his 35th match. In the same match he also equalled Brian Lara's record of playing in 299 ODIs for the West Indies. In the next game against India, he played his 300th ODI match, the only West Indian player to achieve that feat. He also broke the record for the most runs for the West Indies in ODIs, surpassing Brian Lara. In the next match, he scored a breath-taking 72 of just 41 balls, in a knock having 5 maximums, as he led his team to a respectable total of 240 in 35 overs. Chasing a revised target of 255 in 35 overs via DLS, India looked in a spot of bother, but Indian skipper Virat Kohli's unbeaten 114 cost them the match as India won the series 2–0.

In November 2020, Gayle was nominated for the ICC Men's T20I Cricketer of the Decade award. In February 2021, Gayle was recalled to West Indies' T20I squad after two-year absence and named in the T20I squad against Sri Lanka. On 13 July 2021, against Australia in the third T20I, Gayle scored his first T20I half-century in the format since 2016, scoring 67 off 38 deliveries.

In September 2021, Gayle was named in the West Indies' squad for the 2021 ICC Men's T20 World Cup.

=== Retirement ===
On 6 November 2021, Gayle played his last T20I match against Australia in the Sheikh Zayed Cricket Stadium. However he has not announced his retirement from international cricket yet. He wanted to retire in front of his home crowd in Jamaica.

== Twenty20 cricket ==
Chris Gayle's record in Twenty20 matches
	Period	Matches	Runs	HS	100s	50s	Avg.
T20I	2006–21	79	1,899	117	2	14	27.92
IPL	2009–21	142	4,965	175*	6	31	39.72
CLT20	2009–14	6	257	92	0	2	42.83
BBL	2011–16	22	649	100*	1	4	30.90
BPL	2012–22	52	1,723	146*	5	6	38.28
CPL	2013–21	85	2,519	116	4	13	36.50
PSL	2016–21	16	370	68	0	2	23.12
T20 Blast	2015–16	8	505	151*	1	2	84.16

He was made captain of the West Indies team in the ICC T20 World Cup 2009 after getting criticized for playing in the IPL 2008 and missing an international series a few months before. Gayle scored 88 runs in the opening game of the tournament and helped the Windies beat a dominant Australian team before eventually losing in the semi-final to Sri Lanka.

On 1 July 2009, Gayle signed with the Western Australia Warriors for the Australian Domestic Twenty20 tournament known as the Big Bash for the 2009–10 season. In 2011, after being left out of the initial part of the West Indies T20 and one-day home series against Pakistan, Gayle opted to join the Royal Challengers Bangalore in the fourth edition of the Indian Premier League. In his debut game against his previous team Kolkata Knight Riders in their home ground, he scored 102 off 55 balls, hitting 10 fours and 7 sixes. On 6 May 2011, he scored another century, 107 off 49 balls in Bangalore against the Kings XI Punjab, which included 10 fours and 9 sixes. In the next match against Kochi Tuskers Kerala, he scored 37 runs in one over, which included 3 sixes, 3 fours and a no ball that was hit for a six. Although many people cite him as having hit the over for 37, one run was awarded as an extra due to the no ball. He can therefore be said to have hit 36 off an over that went for 37. Gayle won the Orange Cap Award for scoring the most runs in the tournament amassing 608 runs in 12 matches. He was instrumental in many victories for the Royal Challengers Bangalore and received five Man of the Match awards and also the Player of the Tournament award for his performances. In the 2011 Champions League Twenty20, Chris Gayle was the second highest run-scorer in the competition, behind David Warner, with 257 runs from 6 matches at an average of 42.83 and a top score of 92, and was one of the star players.

Following his prolific performances, Gayle was signed by Zimbabwean franchise Matabeleland Tuskers, for the 2011-12 Stanbic Bank 20 Series. As Gayle later recalled it was valuable practice ahead of the KFC Twenty20 Big Bash, where he had signed for the Sydney Thunder. Gayle hoped his first appearance in the tournament was a success, and he gave the spectators something to cheer about. Gayle was the second West Indian to be signed in the event, after the legendary Brian Lara had signed for Southern Rocks the previous season.

Gayle enjoyed great success in that tournament. He was the leading run-scorer in that series with 293 runs, a top score of 109, and an average over 50, the best of the tournament. The only century Gayle scored in the event ended in defeat as Mid West Rhinos's Brendan Taylor's outstanding 75* outlasted his team. The Tuskers could not win the tournament as they were overpowered by Mashonaland Eagles's Ryan ten Doeschate's brilliant 121* off 58 and despite Gayle scoring a half-century, it was not enough to see his home through.

Gayle also joined the Barisal Burners in the Bangladesh Premier League, and had scored two centuries at more than a run-a-ball.

In the 2012 IPL season, Gayle hit the most sixes (59) and was nominated for the orange cap for making 733 in 14 matches.

Gayle was selected for team Uva Next for the inaugural Sri Lanka Premier League in 2012, but did not play for the team due to injury.

Gayle started off his 2013 IPL season scoring 92 not out from 58 balls, hitting 11 fours and four sixes against the Mumbai Indians. His innings helped his team to victory, and he was awarded the man of the match. On 23 April 2013, during an IPL match against Pune Warriors India, Gayle broke multiple scoring records. With an individual score of 175 not out off 66 balls and a century reached in 30 balls, Gayle set records for the fastest century reached in any format of cricket, the highest individual score in a T20 match, and the most sixes scored in a single innings in the IPL. He also took two wickets in the match.

At the launch of the Caribbean Premier League, Gayle was announced as the first franchise player for the league.

During the 2015 T20 Blast season in England, Gayle represented Somerset and despite appearing in just 3 games for the county he contributed 328 runs including a score of 151 not out in a losing cause against Kent. The knock that came from 62 balls included 15 sixes and remains the highest T20 score at the County Ground Taunton.

On 18 January 2016, in a match with the Adelaide Strikers, Gayle set a new Big Bash League record for the fastest fifty and equaled the world record set by Indian batsman Yuvraj Singh against England in the 2007 ICC World Twenty20. He reached 51 in just 12 deliveries which included seven sixes and smashed the previous record of 18 deliveries set by Strikers batsman Tim Ludeman. He was dismissed shortly after for 56 off 17 balls by Travis Head.

Gayle was signed by Lahore Qalandars in 2016 for 200,000 dollars to play in the Pakistan Super League (PSL). Gayle had his worst T20 league, citing back problems. He only scored 103 runs from five matches and was also out twice for a golden duck, the most in his T20 career, by Junaid Khan. Gayle returned for a second season of PSL in 2017, this time picked by Karachi Kings. He played 9 matches for the team, and scored merely 160 runs. This would be prove to be last outing for Gayle in PSL, as he wasn't picked by any team in the 2018 and 2019 drafts of the league. In 2021, he was picked by Quetta Gladiators.

On 18 April 2017, Gayle reached the 10,000 runs milestone in T20 cricket after scoring 77 runs off 38 balls in a match against Gujarat Lions where Royal Challengers Bangalore won by 21 runs. He was also awarded the man of the match which was his first in IPL 2017.

On 16 September 2017, Gayle became the first ever player to hit 100 T20I sixes.

On 28 January 2018, Gayle was bought by Kings XI Punjab (Now Punjab Kings) in the 2018 IPL Auction for his base price of ₹20 million. On 19 April, Gayle scored 104* off 63 balls against Sunrisers Hyderabad, and his team won the match by 15 runs. It was his 6th IPL century. Gayle was retained by the franchise for IPL 2021. He however left the tournament in the second leg, citing 'bio-bubble fatigue'.

In May 2018, Gayle was named as one of the ten marquee players for the first edition of the Global T20 Canada cricket tournament. On 3 June 2018, he was selected to play for the Vancouver Knights in the players' draft for the inaugural edition of the tournament. In September 2018, he was named as the Icon Player for Balkh's squad in the first edition of the Afghanistan Premier League tournament. The following month, he was named in Jozi Stars' squad for the first edition of the Mzansi Super League T20 tournament. In June 2019, he was selected to play for the Vancouver Knights franchise team in the 2019 Global T20 Canada tournament. In September 2019, he was named in the squad for the Jozi Stars team for the 2019 Mzansi Super League tournament. In October 2020, he was drafted by the Kandy Tuskers for the inaugural edition of the Lanka Premier League. In November 2021, he was selected to play for the Colombo Stars following the players' draft for the 2021 Lanka Premier League.

On 17 May 2022, Gayle was inducted into the RCB Hall of Fame (along with AB de Villiers) for his contributions to the team between 2011 and 2017.

In 2022, Chris Gayle made his Legends League Cricket debut for Gujarat Giants.

=== Twenty20 centuries ===
Playing for Royal Challengers Bangalore, Gayle scored a 30-ball century, that became the highest individual T20 score (175 not out). It eclipsed the previous mark set by Brendon McCullum of Kolkata Knight Riders.

Gayle holds the record for most centuries in T20 cricket (22), 9 more than his nearest rival Babar Azam. 15 out of his 22 T20 centuries have been not out.

== Technique and attitude ==
The ball spat off the middle of his bat to all corners, turning into parabolas that the crowd was hollering for. Gayle faced more than half the balls bowled by the Warriors and produced a compressed 20-over highlights package.

— Sharda Ugra of Cricinfo on Gayle's 175* against PWI in IPL 2013

Gayle is known for his characteristic hitting, imposing physique, and timing. He attributes the latter to being very thin when young, and having a heavy bat. He is known for appearing very calm as the bowler approaches. "Tall and imposing at the crease, he loves to carve through the covers off either foot, and has the ability to decimate the figures of even the thriftiest of opening bowlers" recorded Wisden and Cricinfo. He holds numerous records that reflect his batting style, including record Twenty20 strike-rates and high scores.

"It is instinct... We premeditate at times, but most of those things are instinct. When a fast bowler runs in to me, my breathing is controlled. So you keep a still head, slow down your breathing. Sometimes I actually hold my breath, so I can be as still and well-balanced as possible. If you get too excited, you overreact more, and with the adrenalin, you lose focus quickly."

== Music ==
Chris Gayle launched a music career in November 2020 with a dancehall music video called "We Come Out To Party". Earlier in 2020, he had released a video about his partying lifestyle. In April 2021, Gayle released a music video titled "Jamaica to India" in collaboration with the Indian rapper Emiway Bantai. In September 2021, Gayle announced a song named 'Punjabi Daddy'.

== Personal life ==
Gayle's partner is Allysa Berridge. On 20 April 2016, Gayle announced the birth of his daughter on social media platform Instagram. On 9 September 2016, Gayle launched his autobiography Six Machine – I don't like cricket, I love it'.

== Controversies ==
In 2005, Gayle was involved in the dispute between the West Indies Cricket Board and a number of players over sponsorship issues. These players had personal sponsorship deals with Cable and Wireless, who used to sponsor West Indian cricket. However, since the West Indies had recently become sponsored by Cable and Wireless's rivals Digicel, the West Indies Cricket Board demanded the players dropped their Cable and Wireless deals. When the players refused to back down, the West Indies Cricket Board dropped them for the first Test against South Africa. Gayle later cut his deal with Cable and Wireless and rejoined the team for the second Test.

He was charged with conduct contrary to the spirit of cricket during a Test against New Zealand in March 2006 but was subsequently found not guilty. Later that year, during October's Champions Trophy tournament in India, he was fined 30 percent of his match fee after repeated verbal exchanges with the Australian batsman Michael Clarke. He also publicly criticised the West Indies Cricket Board during the 2007 tour of England, which led to an official reprimand and warning.

Gayle also received criticism in early 2009 during West Indies' tour of England, where he commented that he did not want to captain the West Indies any more given the pressures involved, and that he "wouldn't be so sad" if Test cricket was superseded by Twenty20 cricket in the future. From the West Indies, both Viv Richards and Gary Sobers criticised Gayle's comments, as did opposite number Andrew Strauss. Gayle later commented that his statement had been quoted out of context, according to Julian Hunte, President of the West Indies Cricket Board. In an interview with Mike Atherton at the conclusion of a West Indies defeat in their tour of England, Gayle stated that he was not going to resign the captaincy.

In April 2011 Chris Gayle criticised the West Indies Cricket Board and coach Ottis Gibson and did not play for the team for more than a year. On 6 April 2012, Gayle and the WICB reached an understanding that paved the way for the former West Indies captain to return to the national team. On 25 June 2012, Gayle was chosen to be a part of the 2nd T20 and five-match one-day squad series starting on 30 June 2012, in the West Indies and Florida. They won the T20 series 2–0, in which Gayle was awarded man of the series, and the ODI series 4–1, in which Gayle made an aggressive century and half-century.

On 4 January 2016, while being interviewed by Network Ten commentator Mel McLaughlin during the 2015–16 Big Bash League season, Gayle said, "I just wanted to have an interview with you as well; that's why I batted so well," followed by, "Your eyes are beautiful; hopefully we can win this game and then we can have a drink after as well. Don't blush, baby". The comments were criticised by the Australian media, with former Australian test captain Ian Chappell encouraging Cricket Australia to ban him from playing in Australia again. Fellow female sports journalist Neroli Meadows stated that Gayle had been acting in such a way for years, and that he did it to "humiliate" women. Gayle said the comments were intended to be a joke. Melbourne Renegades sanctioned Gayle with a A$10,000 fine for inappropriate conduct. On 30 October 2017, Chris Gayle won a defamation case against Fairfax Media after a jury found a series of articles published in 2016 which alleged he exposed himself to a masseuse were untrue and was awarded with $300k in damages for defamation.

== The Chris Gayle Academy ==
In 2015, Gayle set up 'The Chris Gayle Academy' with the intent on helping disadvantaged children in both Jamaica and the United Kingdom better themselves and their communities through their involvement in sport. Since then the academy has expanded and now facilitates the advancement of young cricketers careers by providing access to quality coaches and playing opportunities abroad.

== International centuries ==
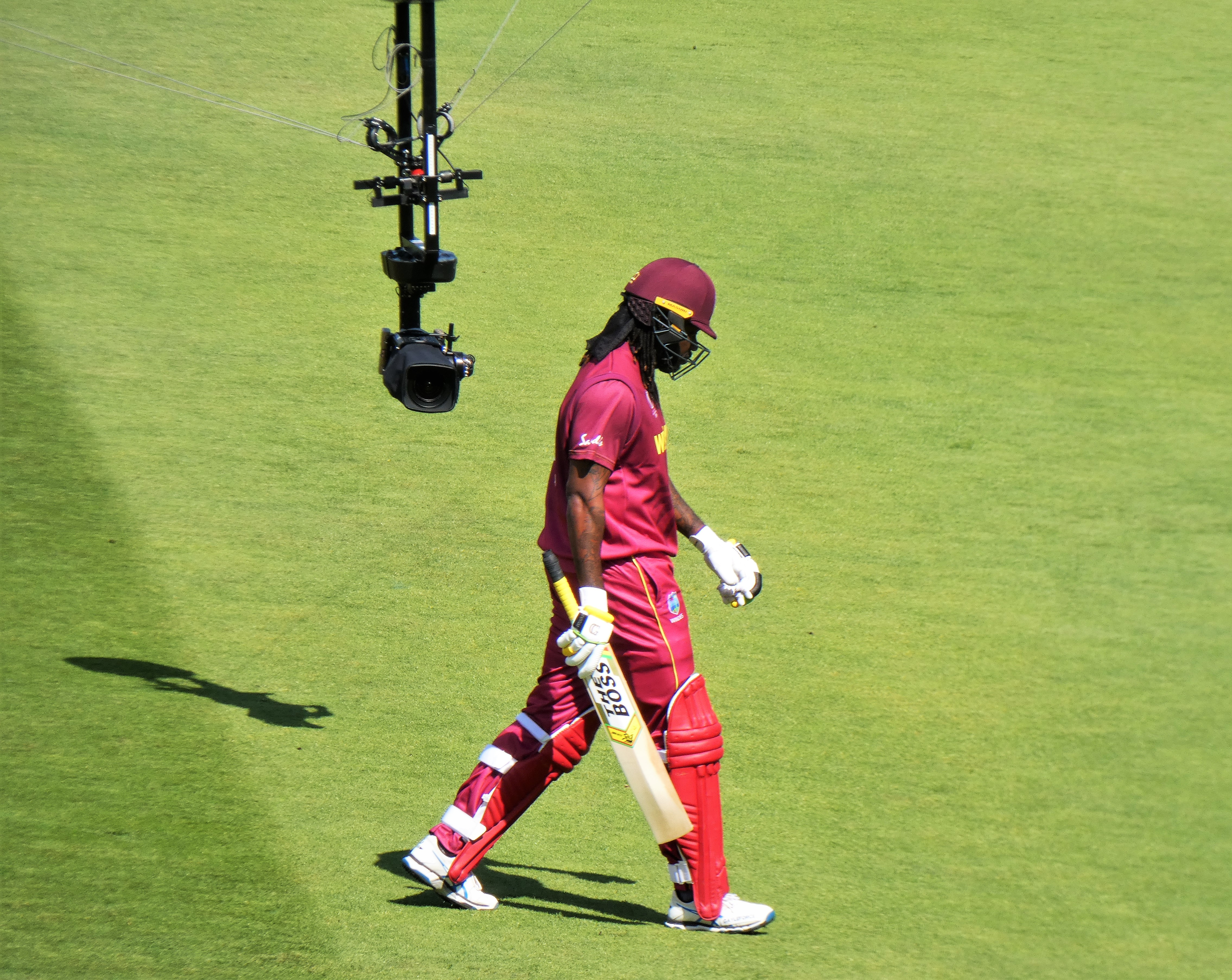
Gayle walks back after being dismissed (2019)

Gayle has scored 42 international centuries, which includes 15 Tests, 25 ODIs and 2 T20I centuries as of 13 July 2021. He was the first cricketer to score centuries in all formats of the game.

== Records ==
=== International ===
1. Highest run scorer for the West Indies in ODIs.
2. Second West Indies player (after Brian Lara), and 14th overall, to pass 10,000 runs in ODIs.
3. First batsman to score a triple century in Test cricket, double century in ODI cricket and a century in T20 internationals.
4. In World Cup 2015, he hit the fastest ever ODI double century, against Zimbabwe, off 138 balls.
5. Third batsman to score a century against eleven different countries in ODIs.
6. Fastest ODI fifty by West Indies batsmen. (50 runs in 19 balls).
7. Most runs in a single ICC Champions Trophy series (474 runs).
8. Only player to hit the first ball of a Test match for six.
9. Along with Marlon Samuels, he holds the record for the highest ever ODI stand for any wicket (372 runs for 2nd wicket).
10. Along with Devon Smith, he set the record for the highest opening stand in ICC World T20 history (145).

=== Domestic T20 ===
1. Leading run scorer in all forms of T20s.
2. First batsman to score 10,000 T20 runs.
3. Fastest batsman to score 4000 runs in IPL.
4. First and only batsman to hit 300 sixes in the IPL.
5. Highest individual score in T20 with 175* (off 66 balls).
6. Highest score by a player in T20 in a losing cause (151*).
7. Joint record for fastest T20 half-century, in 12 balls.
8. Most number of sixes in a T20 innings (18) during the 2017–18 Bangladesh Premier League.

=== T10 ===
Joint Record, with Mohammad Shahzad and Waseem Muhammad for Fastest T10 Fifty in 12 Balls in the Abu Dhabi T10 in 2021.

== Honours ==
West Indies

- ICC Champions Trophy – 2004
- ICC World Twenty20 – 2012, 2016
- ICC ODI Team of the Year – 2004, 2009
- ICC T20I Team of the Decade – 2011–2020

Jamaica Tallawahs

- Caribbean Premier League – 2013, 2016

Rangpur Riders

- Bangladesh Premier League – 2017

Vancouver Knights

- Global T20 Canada – 2018

Balkh Legends

- Afghanistan Premier League – 2018
