= Simon Harmer =

South African cricketer

- Harmer playing for South Africa in 2026

Personal information
- Full name: Simon Ross Harmer
- Born: 10 February 1989 (age 37); Pretoria, Transvaal Province, South Africa
- Batting: Right-handed
- Bowling: Right-arm off break
- Role: Bowler

International information
- National side: South Africa
- Test debut (cap 321): 2 January 2015 v West Indies
- Last Test: 15 November 2026 v Bangladesh

Domestic team information
- Years: Team
- 2009/10–2011/12: Eastern Province
- 2010/11–2018/19: Warriors (squad no. 11)
- 2016/17: Border
- 2017–present: Essex (squad no. 11)
- 2018–2019: Jozi Stars
- 2020/21: Titans
- 2021/22–present: Northerns
- 2022/23, 2025/26: Durban's Super Giants
- 2023/24–2024/25: Sunrisers Eastern Cape

Career statistics
Competition	Test	FC	LA	T20
Matches	18	256	108	231
Runs scored	392	7,254	1,541	1,513
Batting average	19.60	24.09	23.34	16.81
100s/50s	0/1	2/37	0/3	0/2
Top score	82	102*	68	56*
Balls bowled	4,241	60,472	5,240	4,290
Wickets	89	1,084	117	195
Bowling average	23.02	26.45	36.27	28.04
5 wickets in innings	4	62	1	0
10 wickets in match	1	15	0	0
Best bowling	6/16	9/80	5/47	4/18
Catches/stumpings	13/–	269/–	69/–	129/–
- Source: Cricinfo, 19 November 2026

Simon Ross Harmer (born 10 February 1989) is a South African cricketer who has played Test cricket for the national team since 2015. A right arm off spinner and lower order batter, he has also played for the domestic clubs Essex in England since 2017 and Titans in South Africa since 2020. Harmer is the fifth South African to take over 1,000 wickets in first-class cricket.

== Domestic and franchise career ==
=== South Africa ===
Harmer debuted for Warriors in the 2010–2011 first class season against the Cape Cobras claiming 5/98 in the first innings and 1/53 in the second innings to go along with his 46 and 69 runs with the bat. He became a regular fixture in Warriors side in the 2011–2012 side, ending the season as leading wicket taker in his full rookie season, claiming 44 wickets.

In October 2018, Harmer was named in Jozi Stars' squad for the first edition of the Mzansi Super League T20 tournament. He was the leading wicket-taker for Warriors in the 2018–19 CSA 4-Day Franchise Series, with 27 dismissals in seven matches. In September 2019, he was named in the squad for the Jozi Stars team for the 2019 Mzansi Super League tournament.

In April 2021, Harmer was named in Northerns' squad, ahead of the 2021–22 cricket season in South Africa.

=== England ===
Ahead of the 2017 season, Harmer signed for Essex County Cricket Club as a Kolpak player. In June, in the 2017 County Championship, Harmer took 9 wickets for 95 runs in the second innings against Middlesex. He was the first bowler for Essex to take nine wickets in an innings since Mark Ilott in 1995, and he finished with career-best match figures of 14 for 172.

Harmer continued his form and took the wicket to confirm Essex as Champions in the win against Warwickshire. Harmer finished the 2017 season with the second-highest haul in the Country in terms of wickets taken, with 72 wickets at 19.19. Although neither he, nor his team, hit the same heights in 2018, he still managed 57 wickets at 24.45 each and provided useful runs batting at number eight in the batting order.

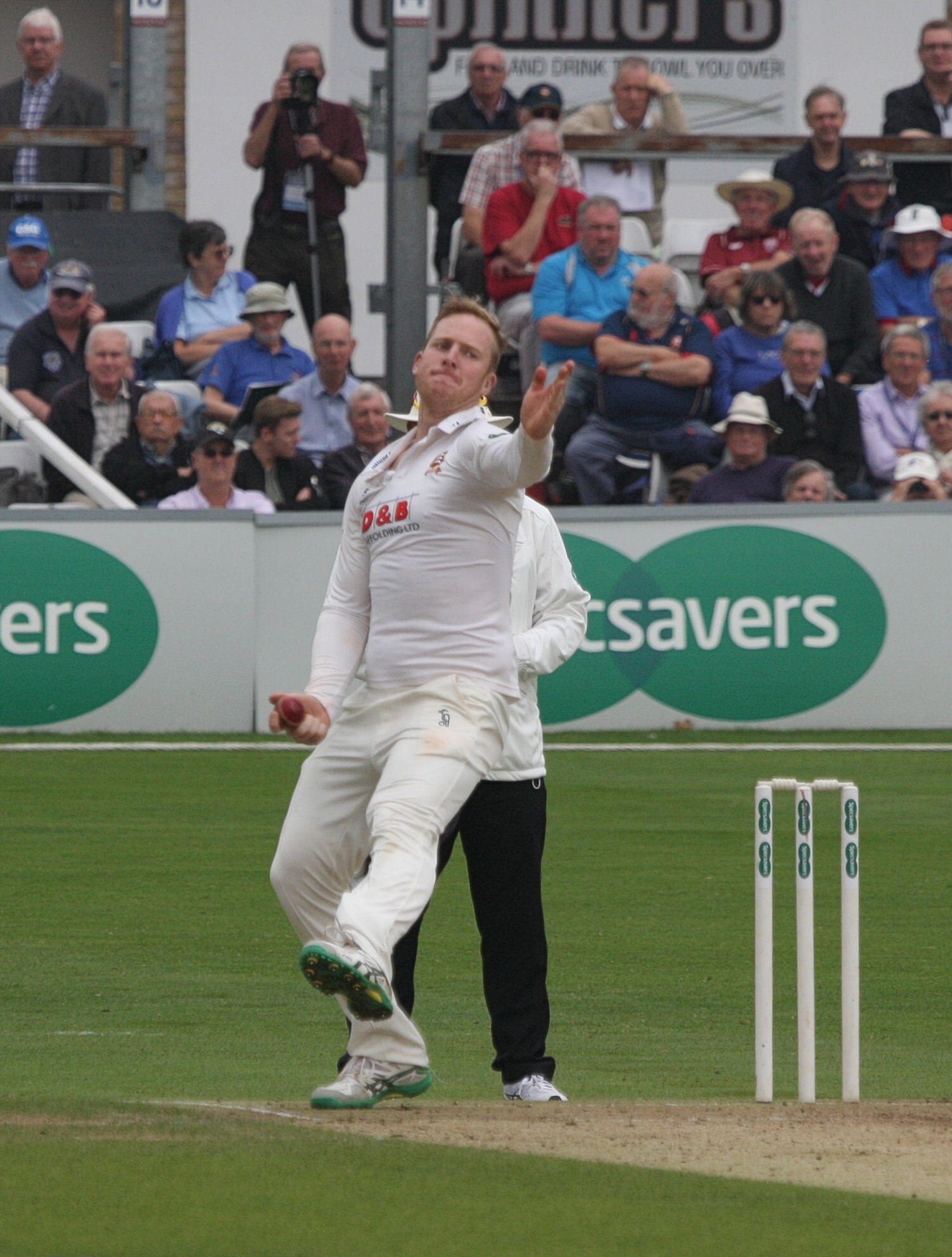
Harmer bowling for Essex in 2017

In September 2019, Harmer captained Essex County Cricket Club to their first ever T20 Blast victory against the Worcestershire County Cricket Club after taking 7 wickets across both the semi-final and final on Finals Day, the most by any bowler on a T20 English Domestic Finals Day. In April 2020 he was named as one of the Wisden Cricketers of the Year for his T20 and Championship performances for Essex in the 2019 season in the 2020 edition of Wisden Cricketers' Almanack.

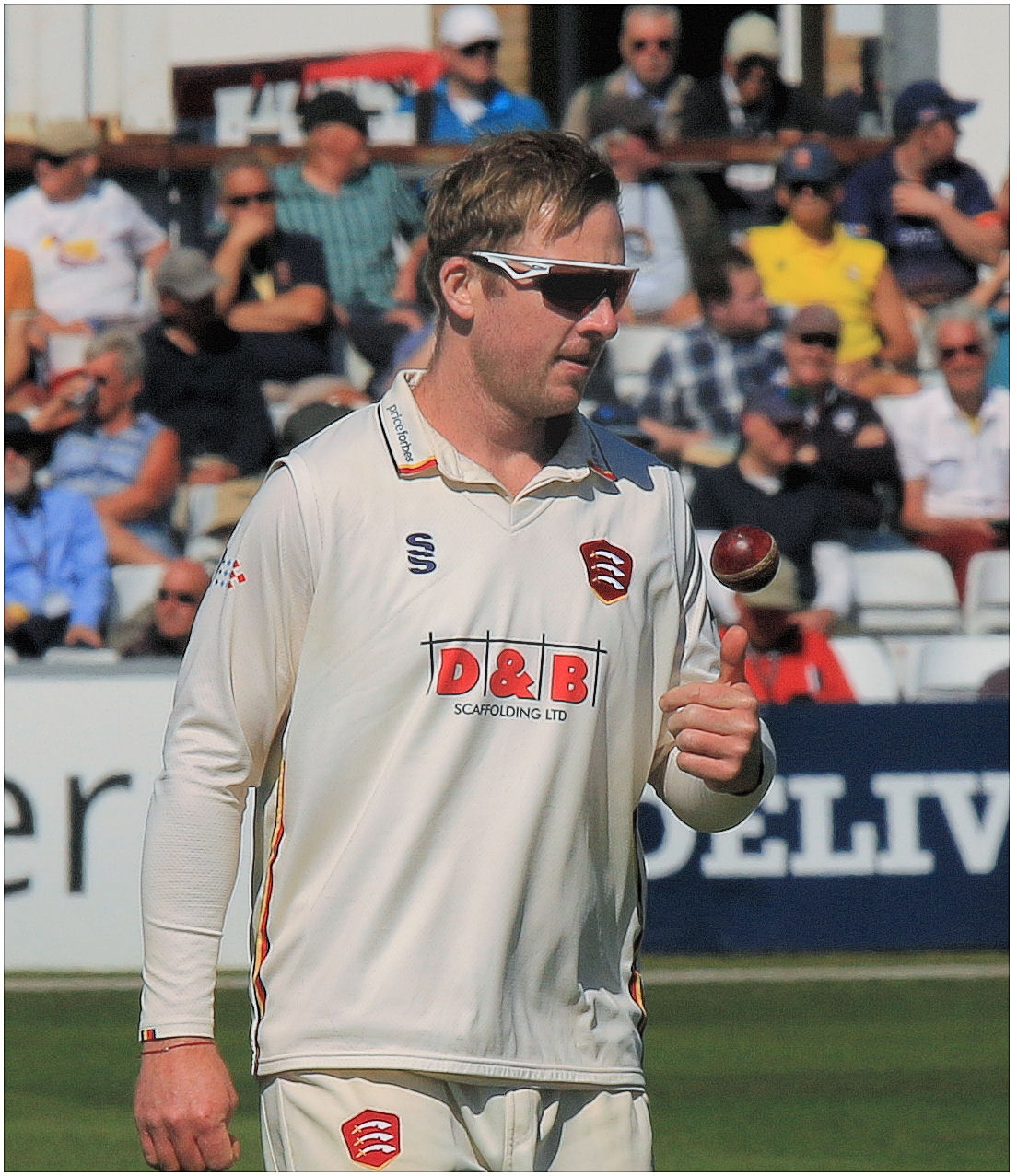
Harmer with Essex in 2025

In 2019 Harmer expressed a desire to play for the England national team, but due to a variety of immigration regulation changes in the wake of Brexit in 2020, this proved impossible and he abandoned the idea in 2021.

== International career ==
Consistent displays at the domestic level earned him a call up for the 3rd Test against West Indies in 2014/15, where he made his Test match debut for South Africa against the West Indies on 2 January 2015 at Newlands, Cape Town. He took his debut Test wicket by bowling Devon Smith in the last over before the lunch break on day one and ended the innings with figures of 3/71 from 26 overs.

In January 2022, Harmer was named in the 17-man South Africa Test squad for their tour of New Zealand.

In April 2022, Harmer made his first appearance for the Proteas Test side in six and a half years against Bangladesh. He and Keshav Maharaj were instrumental in helping defeat Bangladesh 2–0 in the 2 test series, taking 13 wickets.

Harmer in a press conference in 2026

In November 2025, in the first Test of the South African tour of India, Harmer was declared Player of the Match for his spell of 4/30 & 4/21. While faster bowlers applied the initial pressure, Harmer's control, drift and accuracy were instrumental in preventing India from building a sustained counter-attack in a lower-scoring match. South Africa secured their first Test victory on Indian soil since 2010. In the second and final Test of the series, which South Africa won to complete a 2–0 clean sweep, Harmer took six wickets and was noted for outperforming the Indian spinners in home conditions. His performance contributed to India's heaviest defeat in men's Test cricket (by 408 runs) and their second home whitewash in three series. The victory marked South Africa's first Test series win in India in 25 years. Harmer was named Player of the Series for his 17 wickets, and he also became the South African with the most Test wickets in India, with 27 in 4 matches at an average of 15, surpassing Dale Steyn’s tally of 26 wickets in 6 matches at an average of 21. In October 2026, during the 3rd Test against Australia in Newslands, he took his maiden ten-wicket haul in Tests.

== International five-wicket hauls ==
Test five-wicket hauls by Simon Harmer
No.	Bowling Figures	Overs	Innings	Against	Venue	Country	Date	Result
1	6/50	20	3	Pakistan	Rawalpindi Cricket Stadium, Rawalpindi	Pakistan	20 October 2025	South Africa won by 8 wickets
2	6/37	23	4	India	Assam Cricket Association Stadium, Guwahati	India	22 November 2025	South Africa won by 408 runs
3	6/16	21.1	4	Australia	Newlands Cricket Ground, Cape Town	South Africa	27 October 2026	South Africa won by 176 runs
4	6/51	12.3	3	Bangladesh	Wanderers Stadium, Johannesburg	South Africa	15 November 2026	South Africa won by 9 wickets
