= Duanne Olivier =

South African cricketer

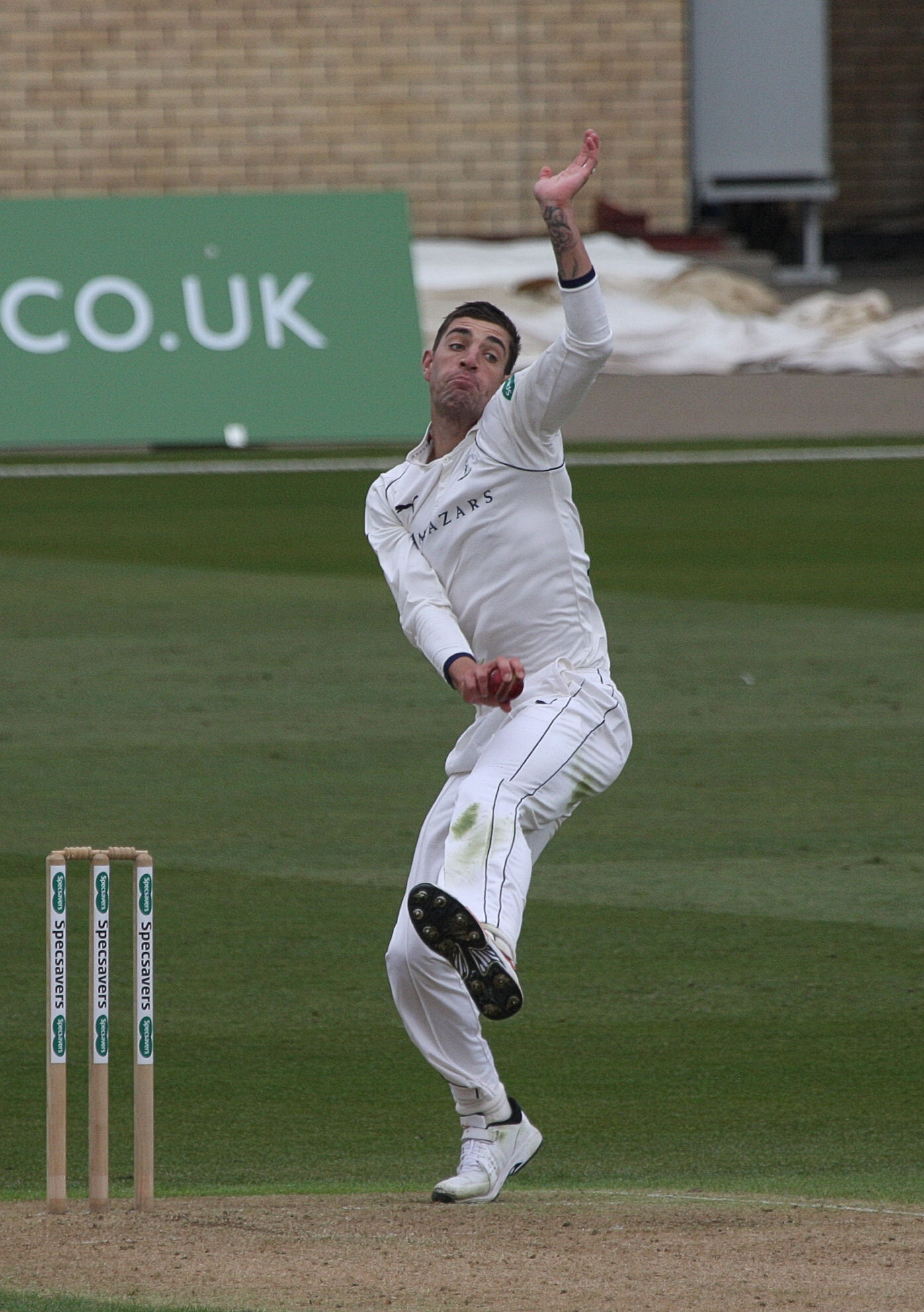
- Olivier bowling for Yorkshire CCC in 2019

Personal information
- Born: 9 May 1992 (age 34); Groblersdal, Limpopo Province, South Africa
- Nickname: Doozle, Doozie
- Batting: Right-handed
- Bowling: Right-arm fast-medium
- Role: Bowler

International information
- National side: South Africa (2017–2024)
- Test debut (cap 329): 12 January 2017 v Sri Lanka
- Last Test: 4 February 2024 v New Zealand
- ODI debut (cap 130): 19 January 2019 v Pakistan
- Last ODI: 22 January 2019 v Pakistan

Domestic team information
- Years: Team
- 2010/11–2017/18: Free State
- 2011/12–2018/19: Knights
- 2018: Derbyshire
- 2018–2019: Jozi Stars
- 2019–2021: Yorkshire
- 2020: Jaffna Stallions
- 2021/22–present: Gauteng
- 2026: Durham

Career statistics
Competition	Test	ODI	FC	LA
Matches	16	2	153	59
Runs scored	66	0	1,708	204
Batting average	6.00	–	12.93	13.60
100s/50s	0/0	0/0	0/4	0/0
Top score	15*	–	72	25*
Balls bowled	2,292	114	25,833	2,421
Wickets	59	3	578	73
Bowling average	24.27	41.33	24.10	29.09
5 wickets in innings	3	0	27	0
10 wickets in match	1	0	4	0
Best bowling	6/37	2/73	6/37	4/34
Catches/stumpings	3/–	0/–	43/–	9/–
- Source: ESPNcricinfo, 27 September 2026

Duanne Olivier (born 9 May 1992) is a South African cricketer who plays for the South Africa cricket team and for the Knights cricket team in domestic fixtures. He is a right-arm fast-medium bowler.

In February 2019, Olivier signed a Kolpak deal to play for Yorkshire County Cricket Club in England, which meant he could not play for South Africa during his contract with Yorkshire. After signing his Kolpak deal, Olivier expressed his hopes to one day play for the England cricket team. When the Kolpak deal ended in 2021 due to Brexit, Olivier continued as an overseas player for Yorkshire and was selected in South Africa's Test squad ahead of their series against India.

== Domestic and franchise career ==
Olivier was the leading wicket-taker in the 2016–17 Sunfoil Series, with 52 dismissals. In May 2017, he was named First-class Cricketer of the Season at Cricket South Africa's annual awards. In August 2017, he was named in Jo'burg Giants' squad for the first season of the T20 Global League. However, in October 2017, Cricket South Africa initially postponed the tournament until November 2018, with it being cancelled soon after.

In October 2018, Olivier was named in Jozi Stars' squad for the first edition of the Mzansi Super League T20 tournament. He was the leading wicket-taker for Knights in the 2018–19 CSA 4-Day Franchise Series, with 27 dismissals in six matches.

In March 2019, while playing for Yorkshire against Leeds/Bradford MCCU in the 2019 Marylebone Cricket Club University Matches, Olivier took his 400th first-class wicket.

In September 2019, Olivier was named in the squad for the Jozi Stars team for the 2019 Mzansi Super League tournament. In October 2020, he was drafted by the Jaffna Stallions for the inaugural edition of the Lanka Premier League. In April 2021, he was named in Gauteng's squad, ahead of the 2021–22 cricket season in South Africa.

== International career ==
In January 2017, Olivier was added to South Africa's Test squad ahead of the third Test against Sri Lanka. He replaced Kyle Abbott, who earlier had quit international cricket to sign for the English team Hampshire as a Kolpak player.

Olivier made his Test debut for South Africa against Sri Lanka on 12 January 2017. In December 2018, in the first innings of South Africa's Boxing Day Test at Centurion Park in Centurion, Olivier took his first five-wicket haul in Tests, against Pakistan. He went on to take another five-wicket haul in the second innings of the match. He finished with 24 wickets across the three Tests of the tour and was named the player of the series. After the Test series, he was then added to South Africa's squad for the first two One Day Internationals (ODIs) against Pakistan. He made his ODI debut for South Africa against Pakistan on 19 January 2019.

== International five-wicket hauls ==
Test five-wicket hauls by Duanne Olivier
No.	Bowling Figures	Overs	Innings	Against	Venue	Country	Date	Result
1	6/37	14	1	Pakistan	Centurion Park, Centurion	South Africa	26 December 2018	South Africa won by 6 wickets
2	5/59	15	3	Pakistan	Centurion Park, Centurion	South Africa	26 December 2018	South Africa won by 6 wickets
3	5/51	13	2	Pakistan	Wanderers Stadium, Johannesburg	South Africa	11 January 2019	South Africa won by 107 runs

== Personal life ==
Olivier was born in Pretoria and currently lives in Bloemfontein. He is a big football fan and is an avid supporter of Manchester United.

== See also ==
- List of Kolpak cricketers
