= 2018 Mzansi Super League =

Cricket tournament

- Dates: 16 November – 16 December 2018
- Administrator: Cricket South Africa
- Cricket format: Twenty20
- Tournament format(s): Double round-robin and knockout
- Champions: Jozi Stars (1st title)
- Runners-up: Cape Town Blitz
- Participants: 6
- Matches: 32
- Attendance: 190,738 (5,961 per match)
- Player of the series: Quinton de Kock (Cape Town Blitz)
- Most runs: Rassie van der Dussen (Jozi Stars) (469)
- Most wickets: Duanne Olivier (Jozi Stars) (20)
- Official website: MSLT20

The 2018 Mzansi Super League was the inaugural edition of the Mzansi Super League (MSL) Twenty20 (T20) franchise cricket tournament in South Africa. It started on 16 November and finished on 16 December 2018. Six teams played a total of thirty-two matches. The players' draft took place on 17 October 2018, with more than 200 international players expressing their interest to take part.

On 18 October 2018, it was announced that Global Sports Commerce (GSC) is the official international commercial and broadcast partner from 2018 up to 2022. On 30 October 2018 it was announced that the Mzansi Super League 2018 champions will receive prize money of ZAR7 million and the runners up will receive R2.5 million, the player of the tournament received R100 000, and each player of the match won R15 000.

On 16 December 2018 the Jozi Stars won the first season final.

== Squads ==
The following players were selected in the player draft on 17 October 2018:

Cape Town Blitz	Durban Heat	Jozi Stars	Nelson Mandela Bay Giants	Paarl Rocks	Tshwane Spartans
Farhaan Behardien (c); ~~JP Duminy~~; Quinton de Kock; Dawid Malan; Andile Phehlukwayo; Dale Steyn; Samuel Badree; Asif Ali; Anrich Nortje; Janneman Malan; Malusi Siboto; George Linde; Ferisco Adams; Jason Smith; Sibonelo Makhanya; Kyle Verreynne; Dane Piedt; Mohammad Nawaz; Hussain Talat; David Bedingham; Nandre Burger	Albie Morkel (c); Hashim Amla; Rashid Khan; David Miller; Heinrich Klaasen; Kyle Abbott; Keshav Maharaj; Khaya Zondo; Marchant de Lange; Vernon Philander; Brandon Mavuta; Temba Bavuma; Morne van Wyk; Okuhle Cele; Sarel Erwee; Tladi Bokako; Prenelan Subrayen	Dane Vilas (c); Kagiso Rabada; Chris Gayle; Rassie van der Dussen; Dan Christian; Beuran Hendricks; Reeza Hendricks; Dwaine Pretorius; Eddie Leie; Pite van Biljon; Duanne Olivier; Ryan Rickelton; Sinethemba Qeshile; Simon Harmer; Calvin Savage; Alfred Mothoa; Nono Pongolo; Delano Potgieter	JJ Smuts (c); Imran Tahir; Jason Roy; Chris Morris; Junior Dala; Christiaan Jonker; Aaron Phangiso; Ben Duckett; Sisanda Magala; Ryan McLaren; Heino Kuhn; Marco Marais; Dyllan Matthews; Lizaad Williams; Rudi Second; Carmi le Roux; Wihan Lubbe	Faf du Plessis (c); Dwayne Bravo; Tabraiz Shamsi; Dane Paterson; Aiden Markram; Mangaliso Mosehle; Bjorn Fortuin; Vaughn van Jaarsveld; Grant Thomson; Paul Stirling; Tshepo Moreki; Henry Davids; Cameron Delport; Eathan Bosch; Patrick Kruger; Kerwin Mungroo; David Wiese; Michael Klinger	AB de Villiers (c); Eoin Morgan; Lungi Ngidi; Robbie Frylinck; Jeevan Mendis; Theunis de Bruyn; Rory Kleinveldt; Sean Williams; Gihahn Cloete; Lutho Sipamla; Tony de Zorzi; Dean Elgar; Andrew Birch; Sikandar Raza; Shaun von Berg; Eldred Hawken; Rilee Rossouw; Corbin Bosch; Andrea Agathangelou

Before the start of the tournament, JP Duminy was ruled out due to injury and was replaced by Quinton de Kock as the marquee player for Cape Town Blitz.

== Points table ==
Pos	Team	Pld	W	L	NR	Pts	NRR
1	Cape Town Blitz	10	6	3	1	30	0.941
2	Jozi Stars	10	6	4	0	29	1.295
3	Paarl Rocks	10	5	5	0	22	−0.292
4	Nelson Mandela Bay Giants	10	4	4	2	21	−0.448
5	Tshwane Spartans	10	4	6	0	16	−1.044
6	Durban Heat	10	3	6	1	14	−0.716

- The team topping the table after the league phase progressed to the final.
- The second and third teams played against each other in the Play-off match.
- The winning team gets a bonus point for a run rate better than 1.25 times that of the losing team.

== League stage ==
The MSL released the full fixture list on 18 October 2018. The team that tops the table gets direct passage to the final and will also have home ground advantage.

16 November
19:00 (D/N)
Scorecard

(H) Cape Town Blitz; 180/4 (20 overs)	v	Tshwane Spartans; 131 (19.3 overs)
Mohammad Nawaz 59 (37); Andrew Birch 2/39 (4 overs)		AB de Villiers 59 (30); Ferisco Adams 3/28 (3.3 overs)

Cape Town Blitz won by 49 runs
Newlands Cricket Ground, Cape Town
Umpires: Stephen Harris and Adrian Holdstock
Player of the match: Mohammad Nawaz (Cape Town Blitz)

- Tshwane Spartans won the toss and elected to field.

17 November
19:00 (D/N)
Scorecard

(H) Jozi Stars; 124/7 (20 overs)	v	Nelson Mandela Bay Giants; 127/5 (18 overs)
Dane Vilas 38* (34); JJ Smuts 3/20 (4 overs)		Ben Duckett 75 (45); Beuran Hendricks 2/13 (4 overs)

Nelson Mandela Bay Giants won by 5 wickets
New Wanderers Stadium, Johannesburg
Umpires: Bongani Jele and Allahudien Paleker
Player of the match: Ben Duckett (Nelson Mandela Bay Giants)

- Nelson Mandela Bay Giants won the toss and elected to field.

18 November
11:00
Scorecard

(H) Durban Heat; 157/5 (20 overs)	v	Cape Town Blitz; 158/7 (19.1 overs)
Khaya Zondo 49* (42); Anrich Nortje 4/32 (4 overs)		Asif Ali 80 (33); Keshav Maharaj 3/24 (4 overs)

Cape Town Blitz won by 3 wickets
Kingsmead Cricket Ground, Durban
Umpires: Arno Jacobs and Brad White
Player of the match: Asif Ali (Cape Town Blitz)

- Cape Town Blitz won the toss and elected to field.

18 November
15:30
Scorecard

Tshwane Spartans; 203/5 (20 overs)	v	Paarl Rocks (H); 202/6 (20 overs)
Gihahn Cloete 80 (49); Dwayne Bravo 3/31 (4 overs)		Cameron Delport 73 (43); Jeevan Mendis 2/35 (4 overs)

Tshwane Spartans won by 1 run
Boland Park, Paarl
Umpires: Stephen Harris and Adrian Holdstock
Player of the match: Theunis de Bruyn (Tshwane Spartans)

- Paarl Rocks won the toss and elected to field.

20 November
19:00 (D/N)
Scorecard

Jozi Stars; 209/2 (20 overs)	v	Paarl Rocks (H); 149 (18.4 overs)
Ryan Rickelton 91 (59); David Wiese 1/37 (4 overs)		Henry Davids 60 (36); Simon Harmer 3/22 (4 overs)

Jozi Stars won by 60 runs
Boland Park, Paarl
Umpires: Johan Cloete and Brad White
Player of the match: Ryan Rickelton (Jozi Stars)

- Paarl Rocks won the toss and elected to field.

21 November
14:00
Scorecard

Tshwane Spartans; 139/9 (19 overs)	v	Durban Heat (H); 129/6 (16.3 overs)
Gihahn Cloete 55 (43); Kyle Abbott 4/27 (4 overs)		Albie Morkel 26 (12); Lutho Sipamla 3/22 (3 overs)

Durban Heat won by 10 runs (D/L method)
Kingsmead Cricket Ground, Durban
Umpires: Lubabalo Gcuma and Allahudien Paleker
Player of the match: Kyle Abbott (Durban Heat)

- Durban Heat won the toss and elected to field.
- The match was reduced to 19 overs per side due to rain.
- Rain stopped play during Durban Heat's innings.

21 November
19:00 (D/N)
Scorecard

(H) Cape Town Blitz; 175/6 (20 overs)	v	Nelson Mandela Bay Giants; 132/6 (16 overs)
Janneman Malan 57 (39); Chris Morris 2/32 (4 overs)		Heino Kuhn 55 (35); Hussain Talat 2/7 (1 over)

Cape Town Blitz won by 12 runs (D/L method)
Newlands Cricket Ground, Cape Town
Umpires: Bongani Jele and Brad White
Player of the match: Janneman Malan (Cape Town Blitz)

- Cape Town Blitz won the toss and elected to bat.
- A light failure stopped play during Nelson Mandela Bay Giants' innings. The target was reduced to 145 runs from 16 overs.

23 November
19:00 (D/N)
Scorecard

Durban Heat; 127/6 (20 overs)	v	Nelson Mandela Bay Giants (H); 131/1 (17.3 overs)
Albie Morkel 28r (21); Junior Dala 2/16 (4 overs)		JJ Smuts 62* (52); Vernon Philander 1/17 (3 overs)

Nelson Mandela Bay Giants won by 9 wickets
St George's Oval, Port Elizabeth
Umpires: Adrian Holdstock and Dennis Smith
Player of the match: Junior Dala (Nelson Mandela Bay Giants)

- Nelson Mandela Bay Giants won the toss and elected to field.

24 November
19:00 (D/N)
Scorecard

Cape Town Blitz; 198/5 (20 overs)	v	Jozi Stars (H); 136 (17.4 overs)
Quinton de Kock 74 (36); Duanne Olivier 3/40 (4 overs)		Dane Vilas 29 (26); George Linde 3/25 (3.4 overs)

Cape Town Blitz won by 62 runs
New Wanderers Stadium, Johannesburg
Umpires: Stephen Harris and Allahudien Paleker
Player of the match: Quinton de Kock (Cape Town Blitz)

- Jozi Stars won the toss and elected to field.

25 November
11:00
Scorecard

Nelson Mandela Bay Giants; 143/9 (20 overs)	v	Tshwane Spartans (H); 35/3 (5.1 overs)
Marco Marais 47 (41); Jeevan Mendis 4/22 (4 overs)		Theunis de Bruyn 12* (7); Carmi le Roux 1/0 (0.1 overs)

Nelson Mandela Bay Giants won by 7 runs (D/L method)
SuperSport Park, Centurion
Umpires: Johan Cloete and Bongani Jele
Player of the match: Marco Marais (Nelson Mandela Bay Giants)

- Tshwane Spartans won the toss and elected to field.
- Lightning stopped play during Tshwane Spartans' innings.

25 November
15:30
Scorecard

Cape Town Blitz; 140 (20 overs)	v	Paarl Rocks (H); 144/5 (18.5 overs)
Quinton de Kock 31 (16); Bjorn Fortuin 4/15 (4 overs)		Faf du Plessis 54 (39); Dale Steyn 2/21 (3 overs)

Paarl Rocks won by 5 wickets
Boland Park, Paarl
Umpires: Murray Brown and Lubabalo Gcuma
Player of the match: Bjorn Fortuin (Paarl Rocks)

- Cape Town Blitz won the toss and elected to bat.

27 November
19:00 (D/N)
Scorecard

(H) Nelson Mandela Bay Giants	v	Cape Town Blitz

Match abandoned
St George's Oval, Port Elizabeth
Umpires: Stephen Harris and Arno Jacobs

- No toss.
- No play was possible due to rain.

28 November
14:00
Scorecard

Jozi Stars; 186/5 (20 overs)	v	Tshwane Spartans (H); 188/6 (19.3 overs)
Reeza Hendricks 55 (48); Jeevan Mendis 2/37 (4 overs)		Dean Elgar 79* (52); Simon Harmer 3/26 (4 overs)

Tshwane Spartans won by 4 wickets
SuperSport Park, Centurion
Umpires: Bongani Jele and Allahudien Paleker
Player of the match: Dean Elgar (Tshwane Spartans)

- Tshwane Spartans won the toss and elected to field.

28 November
19:00 (D/N)
Scorecard

Paarl Rocks; 98/2 (9 overs)	v	Durban Heat (H); 80/6 (9 overs)
Henry Davids 46 (25); Kyle Abbott 1/20 (2 overs)		David Miller 22 (11); Bjorn Fortuin 2/6 (1 over)

Paarl Rocks won by 32 runs (D/L method)
Kingsmead Cricket Ground, Durban
Umpires: Johan Cloete and Dennis Smith
Player of the match: Henry Davids (Paarl Rocks)

- Durban Heat won the toss and elected to field.
- The match was reduced to 9 overs per side due to rain.
- Durban Heat were set a reviserd target of 113 runs.

30 November
14:00
Scorecard

(H) Nelson Mandela Bay Giants; 168/9 (20 overs)	v	Paarl Rocks; 120 (19.3 overs)
Heino Kuhn 54 (36); Dane Paterson 2/26 (4 overs)		Aiden Markram 50 (39); Sisanda Magala 3/17 (3.3 overs)

Nelson Mandela Bay Giants won by 48 runs
St George's Oval, Port Elizabeth
Umpires: Shaun George and Clifford Isaacs
Player of the match: Heino Kuhn (Nelson Mandela Bay Giants)

- Nelson Mandela Bay Giants won the toss and elected to bat.

30 November
19:00 (D/N)
Scorecard

(H) Jozi Stars; 230/3 (20 overs)	v	Durban Heat; 177 (18.1 overs)
Reeza Hendricks 104* (51); Albie Morkel 1/3 (1 over)		Morne van Wyk 66 (33); Kagiso Rabada 4/27 (4 overs)

Jozi Stars won by 53 runs
New Wanderers Stadium, Johannesburg
Umpires: Siphelele Gasa and Dennis Smith
Player of the match: Reeza Hendricks (Jozi Stars)

- Durban Heat won the toss and elected to field.

1 December
19:00 (D/N)
Scorecard

Cape Town Blitz; 172/9 (20 overs)	v	Tshwane Spartans (H); 112 (18.2 runs)
Quinton de Kock 108 (55); Sean Williams 2/14 (2 overs)		Dean Elgar 37 (26); Mohammad Nawaz 3/14 (3 overs)

Cape Town Blitz won by 60 runs
SuperSport Park, Centurion
Umpires: Adrian Holdstock and Phillip Vosloo
Player of the match: Quinton de Kock (Cape Town Blitz)

- Tshwane Spartans won the toss and elected to field.

2 December
11:00
Scorecard

Durban Heat; 154/6 (20 overs)	v	Paarl Rocks (H); 158/1 (19.1 overs)
Khaya Zondo 38* (34); Tabraiz Shamsi 2/20 (4 overs)		Faf du Plessis 76* (48); Brandon Mavuta 1/32 (4 overs)

Paarl Rocks won by 9 wickets
Boland Park, Paarl
Umpires: Bongani Jele and Abdoellah Steenkamp
Player of the match: Faf du Plessis (Paarl Rocks)

- Durban Heat won the toss and elected to bat.

2 December
15:30 (D/N)
Scorecard

Jozi Stars; 173/3 (20 overs)	v	Nelson Mandela Bay Giants (H); 92 (16.4 overs)
Reeza Hendricks 108* (62); Aaron Phangiso 1/22 (3 overs)		Aaron Phangiso 17 (18); Dwaine Pretorius 3/17 (4 overs)

Jozi Stars won by 81 runs
St George's Oval, Port Elizabeth
Umpires: Shaun George and Arno Jacobs
Player of the match: Reeza Hendricks (Jozi Stars)

- Jozi Stars won the toss and elected to bat.

4 December
19:00 (D/N)
Scorecard

Jozi Stars; 196/4 (20 overs)	v	Cape Town Blitz (H); 146 (19.4 overs)
Reeza Hendricks 79 (48); Nandre Burger 2/32 (4 overs)		Janneman Malan 43 (37); Daniel Christian 4/22 (4 overs)

Jozi Stars won by 50 runs
Newlands Cricket Ground, Cape Town
Umpires: Lubabalo Gcuma and Adrian Holdstock
Player of the match: Reeza Hendricks (Jozi Stars)

- Jozi Stars won the toss and elected to bat

5 December
14:00
Scorecard

Paarl Rocks; 121 (17.4 overs)	v	Tshwane Spartans (H); 122/6 (19.3 overs)
Faf du Plessis 38 (19); Lutho Sipamla 3/19 (4 overs)		Gihahn Cloete 30 (34); Tabraiz Shamsi 3/18 (4 overs)

Tshwane Spartans won by 4 wickets
SuperSport Park, Centurion
Umpires: Shaun George and Stephen Harris
Player of the match: Lutho Sipamla (Tshwane Spartans)

- Paarl Rocks won the toss and elected to bat.

5 December
19:00 (D/N)
Scorecard

Nelson Mandela Bay Giants; 121/2 (13.3 overs)	v	Durban Heat (H)
JJ Smuts 62* (45); Rashid Khan 1/19 (3 overs)

No result
Kingsmead Cricket Ground, Durban
Umpires: Allahudien Paleker and Dennis Smith

- Nelson Mandela Bay Giants won the toss and elected to bat.
- Rain stopped play during Nelson Mandela Bay Giants' innings.

7 December
14:00
Scorecard

(H) Durban Heat; 128 (18.3 overs)	v	Jozi Stars; 131/9 (19.4 overs)
Sarel Erwee 62 (39); Kagiso Rabada 3/29 (3.3 overs)		Dane Vilas 43 (36); Rashid Khan 3/19 (4 overs)

Jozi Stars won by 1 wicket
Kingsmead Cricket Ground, Durban
Umpires: Stephen Harris and Arno Jacobs
Player of the match: Dane Vilas (Jozi Stars)

- Durban Heat won the toss and elected to bat.

7 December
19:00 (D/N)
Scorecard

Paarl Rocks; 144/9 (20 overs)	v	Cape Town Blitz (H); 148/4 (15.3 overs)
Faf du Plessis 61 (39); Dale Steyn 2/22 (4 overs)		Quinton de Kock 93 (47); Dwayne Bravo 2/18 (4 overs)

Cape Town Blitz won by 6 wickets
Newlands Cricket Ground, Cape Town
Umpires: Murray Brown and Johan Cloete
Player of the match: Quinton de Kock (Cape Town Blitz)

- Paarl Rocks won the toss and elected to bat.

8 December
19:00 (D/N)
Scorecard

Tshwane Spartans; 165/4 (20 overs)	v	Nelson Mandela Bay Giants (H); 137/9 (20 overs)
Gihahn Cloete 65 (59); Lizaad Williams 1/15 (2 overs)		Ben Duckett 47 (33); Shaun von Berg 3/19 (4 overs)

Tshwane Spartans won by 28 runs
St George's Oval, Port Elizabeth
Umpires: Lubabalo Gcuma and Shaun George
Player of the match: Gihahn Cloete (Tshwane Spartans)

- Tshwane Spartans won the toss and elected to bat.

9 December
11:00
Scorecard

(H) Jozi Stars; 170/6 (20 overs)	v	Paarl Rocks; 172/4 (19.3 overs)
Rassie van der Dussen 83* (55); Kerwin Mungroo 3/29 (4 overs)		Grant Thomson 71* (55); Duanne Olivier 3/30 (4 overs)

Paarl Rocks won by 6 wickets
New Wanderers Stadium, Johannesburg
Umpires: Arno Jacobs and Bongani Jele
Player of the match: Grant Thomson (Paarl Rocks)

- Paarl Rocks won the toss and elected to field.

9 December
15:30
Scorecard

(H) Cape Town Blitz; 161/6 (20 overs)	v	Durban Heat; 162/4 (19.3 overs)
Quinton de Kock 86* (55); Heinrich Klaasen 1/12 (2 overs)		Khaya Zondo 67 (42); Mohammad Nawaz 2/21 (4 overs)

Durban Heat won by 6 wickets
Newlands Cricket Ground, Cape Town
Umpires: Johan Cloete and Adrian Holdstock
Player of the match: Khaya Zondo (Durban Heat)

- Cape Town Blitz won the toss and elected to bat.

11 December
19:00 (D/N)
Scorecard

(H) Jozi Stars; 239/3 (20 overs)	v	Tshwane Spartans; 138 (17.2 overs)
Rassie van der Dussen 96* (44); Dean Elgar 1/16 (2 overs)		Gihahn Cloete 50 (40); Nono Pongolo 6/20 (4 overs)

Jozi Stars won by 101 runs
New Wanderers Stadium, Johannesburg
Umpires: Lubabalo Gcuma and Allahudien Paleker
Player of the match: Rassie van der Dussen (Jozi Stars)

- Jozi Stars won the toss and elected to bat.

12 December
14:00
Scorecard

Nelson Mandela Bay Giants; 129/8 (20 overs)	v	Paarl Rocks (H); 130/4 (15.2 overs)
Rudi Second 37 (41); Dwayne Bravo 3/22 (4 overs)		Cameron Delport 84 (45); Sisanda Magala 2/15 (3 overs)

Paarl Rocks won by 6 wickets
Boland Park, Paarl
Umpires: Shaun George and Stephen Harris
Player of the match: Cameron Delport (Paarl Rocks)

- Nelson Mandela Bay Giants won the toss and elected to bat

12 December
19:00 (D/N)
Scorecard

(H) Tshwane Spartans; 188/6 (20 overs)	v	Durban Heat; 189/8 (19.5 overs)
AB de Villiers 93* (52); Rashid Khan 2/25 (4 overs)		Albie Morkel 57* (28); Lutho Sipamla 3/37 (4 overs)

Durban Heat won by 2 wickets
SuperSport Park, Centurion
Umpires: Adrian Holdstock and Dennis Smith
Player of the match: Albie Morkel (Durban Heat)

- Tshwane Spartans won the toss and elected to bat.

== Playoffs ==
Eliminator		Final
		1	Cape Town Blitz	113/7 (20)
2	Jozi Stars	2	Jozi Stars	115/2 (17.3)
3	Paarl Rocks

=== Eliminator ===
14 December
19:00 (D/N)
Scorecard

Jozi Stars	v	Paarl Rocks

Match abandoned
New Wanderers Stadium, Johannesburg
Umpires: Bongani Jele and Allahudien Paleker

- Paarl Rocks won the toss and elected to field.
- No play was possible due to rain.
- Jozi Stars advanced to the final as a result of finishing higher in League Stage.

=== Final ===
16 December
15:30 (D/N)
Scorecard

Cape Town Blitz; 113/7 (20 overs)	v	Jozi Stars; 115/2 (17.3 overs)
Farhaan Behardien 23 (22); Beuran Hendricks 2/21 (4 overs)		Rassie van der Dussen 59* (54); Malusi Siboto 1/18 (3 overs)

Jozi Stars won by 8 wickets
Newlands Cricket Ground, Cape Town
Umpires: Shaun George and Adrian Holdstock
Player of the match: Beuran Hendricks (Jozi Stars)

- Cape Town Blitz won the toss and elected to bat.
- Jozi Stars have won the inaugural MSL title

== Statistics ==
=== Most runs ===
Player	Team	Mat	Inns	Runs	Ave	SR	HS	100	50	4s	6s
Rassie van der Dussen	Jozi Stars	12	11	469	58.62	138.75	96	0	4	27	23
Quinton de Kock	Cape Town Blitz	8	8	412	58.85	169.54	108	1	3	45	18
Reeza Hendricks	Jozi Stars	10	9	412	58.85	142.56	108	2	2	37	20
Gihahn Cloete	Tshwane Spartans	10	10	330	33.00	113.79	80	0	4	38	5
Faf du Plessis	Paarl Rocks	9	8	318	53.00	156.65	76	0	4	33	7

=== Most wickets ===
Player	Team	Mat	Inns	Wkts	BBI	Avg	Econ	SR	4w	5w
Duanne Olivier	Jozi Stars	8	8	20	3/30	13.20	7.88	10.0	0	0
Jeevan Mendis	Tshwane Spartans	9	9	16	4/22	16.62	8.26	12.0	1	0
Lutho Sipamla	Tshwane Spartans	10	10	16	3/19	20.56	8.89	13.8	0	0
Kagiso Rabada	Jozi Stars	8	8	13	4/27	18.38	6.73	16.3	1	0
Beuran Hendricks	Jozi Stars	8	8	12	2/13	17.16	7.40	13.9	0	0
