= Pakistani cricket team in South Africa in 2018–19 =

International cricket tour

	South Africa	Pakistan
- Dates: 19 December 2018 – 6 February 2019
Captains	Faf du Plessis (Note: Dean Elgar captained South Africa for the third Test. David Miller captained South Africa for the second and third T20Is.)	Sarfaraz Ahmed (Tests & ODIs) (Note: Shoaib Malik captained Pakistan for the fourth and fifth ODIs.); Shoaib Malik (T20Is)

Test series
- Result: South Africa won the 3-match series 3–0
Most runs	Quinton de Kock (251)	Shan Masood (228)
Most wickets	Duanne Olivier (24)	Mohammad Amir (12)
- Player of the series: Duanne Olivier (SA)

One Day International series
- Results: South Africa won the 5-match series 3–2
Most runs	Rassie van der Dussen (241)	Imam-ul-Haq (271)
Most wickets	Andile Phehlukwayo (8)	Shaheen Afridi (6)
- Player of the series: Imam-ul-Haq (Pak)

Twenty20 International series
- Results: South Africa won the 3-match series 2–1
Most runs	Reeza Hendricks (107)	Babar Azam (151)
Most wickets	Beuran Hendricks (8)	Mohammad Amir (3); Imad Wasim (3); Faheem Ashraf (3); Usman Shinwari (3)
- Player of the series: David Miller (SA)

The Pakistan cricket team toured South Africa between December 2018 and February 2019 to play three Tests, five One Day Internationals (ODIs) and three Twenty20 International (T20I) matches. The ODI fixtures were part of both teams' preparation for the 2019 Cricket World Cup.

South Africa's Boxing Day Test was held at Centurion Park in Centurion for the first time. In the first session of the match, Dale Steyn became South Africa's leading wicket-taker in Tests, taking his 422nd wicket, surpassing Shaun Pollock who had held the record for ten years. South Africa's captain Faf du Plessis was penalised for a slow over-rate in the second Test and was suspended for the third and final Test of the series. Dean Elgar was named as the stand-in captain for the third Test. South Africa won the Test series 3–0.

During the second ODI, Pakistan's captain Sarfaraz Ahmed was caught on the stump mics making a racist comment towards Andile Phehlukwayo. Sarfraz played in the third ODI match, but was then suspended by the International Cricket Council (ICC) for the next four matches, missing the last two ODIs and the first two T20Is of the tour. Shoaib Malik was named as the captain for the fourth and fifth ODIs and the T20I series. The Pakistan Cricket Board (PCB) were disappointed with the ICC's decision to suspend Sarfraz, after Sarfraz apologised in person to Phehlukwayo before the start of the third ODI. South Africa went on to win the ODI series 3–2.

Faf du Plessis was rested for the last two T20Is of the series, with David Miller named as the captain of South Africa in his place. South Africa won the T20I series 2–1.

== Squads ==
Tests		ODIs		T20Is	
South Africa	Pakistan	South Africa	Pakistan	South Africa	Pakistan
Faf du Plessis (c); Hashim Amla; Temba Bavuma; Theunis de Bruyn; Dean Elgar; Zubayr Hamza; Quinton de Kock (wk); Keshav Maharaj; Pieter Malan; Aiden Markram; Duanne Olivier; Dane Paterson; Vernon Philander; Kagiso Rabada; Dale Steyn	Sarfaraz Ahmed (c, wk); Mohammad Abbas; Shaheen Afridi; Azhar Ali; Hasan Ali; Mohammad Amir; Faheem Ashraf; Babar Azam; Imam-ul-Haq; Shadab Khan; Shan Masood; Mohammad Rizwan; Asad Shafiq; Yasir Shah; ~~Haris Sohail~~; Fakhar Zaman	Faf du Plessis (c); Hashim Amla; Quinton de Kock; Beuran Hendricks; Reeza Hendricks; Heinrich Klaasen; Aiden Markram; David Miller; Wiaan Mulder; Duanne Olivier; Dane Paterson; Andile Phehlukwayo; Dwaine Pretorius; Kagiso Rabada; Tabraiz Shamsi; Dale Steyn; Imran Tahir; Rassie van der Dussen	Sarfaraz Ahmed (c, wk); Shaheen Afridi; Hasan Ali; Mohammad Amir; Faheem Ashraf; Babar Azam; Imam-ul-Haq; Mohammad Hafeez; Shadab Khan; Shoaib Malik; Shan Masood; Mohammad Rizwan; Usman Shinwari; Hussain Talat; Imad Wasim; Fakhar Zaman	Faf du Plessis (c); Gihahn Cloete; Junior Dala; ~~Quinton de Kock~~; Beuran Hendricks; Reeza Hendricks; Heinrich Klaasen; Janneman Malan; David Miller; Chris Morris; Wiaan Mulder; Andile Phehlukwayo; Tabraiz Shamsi; Lutho Sipamla; Rassie van der Dussen	Shoaib Malik (c); ~~Sarfaraz Ahmed (c, wk)~~; Shaheen Afridi; Hasan Ali; Mohammad Amir; Faheem Ashraf; Asif Ali; Babar Azam; Sahibzada Farhan; Mohammad Hafeez; Shadab Khan; Mohammad Rizwan (wk); Usman Shinwari; Hussain Talat; Imad Wasim; Fakhar Zaman

Dane Paterson was added to South Africa's squad for the first Test, replacing Vernon Philander, who had a finger injury. Pakistan's Haris Sohail suffered an injury before the start of the first Test and was later ruled out of the rest of the series. Pieter Malan was named as cover for Aiden Markram in South Africa's squad ahead of the third Test.

For the first two ODIs, South Africa rested Dale Steyn and Quinton de Kock, replacing them with Duanne Olivier and Aiden Markram. For the last three ODIs, Beuran Hendricks was added to South Africa's squad. Quinton de Kock and Dale Steyn were re-added to South Africa's squad for the last three matches after being rested, with Duanne Olivier, Dane Paterson and Heinrich Klaasen being dropped. Wiaan Mulder was added to South Africa's squad for the fifth ODI.

Mohammad Rizwan was added to Pakistan's squad for the T20I series, after Sarfaraz Ahmed was suspended. Asif Ali was also added to Pakistan's T20I squad. Quinton de Kock was ruled out of South Africa's T20I squad with a groin injury and was replaced by Janneman Malan. Mohammad Amir was added to Pakistan's squad for the final T20I of the series.

== Tour match ==
=== Three-day match: Cricket South Africa Invitation XI vs Pakistan ===
19–21 December 2018
Scorecard

Cricket South Africa Invitation XI	v	Pakistan
318/7d (84.3 overs); Marques Ackerman 103* (132); Azhar Ali 2/19 (8 overs)		306/7d (78.2 overs); Babar Azam 104* (129); Thandolwethu Mnyaka 3/45 (16 overs)
182/7d (50.3 overs); Neil Brand 71 (145); Mohammad Amir 3/35 (12 overs)		195/4 (40.2 overs); Haris Sohail 73* (87); Kyle Simmonds 2/79 (16 overs)

Pakistan won by 6 wickets
Willowmoore Park, Benoni
Umpires: Shaun George (SA) and Adrian Holdstock (SA)

- Cricket South Africa Invitation XI won the toss and elected to bat.

== Test series ==
=== 1st Test ===
26–30 December 2018 (Note: While five days of play were scheduled for each Test, the first Test reached a result in three days, and the second and third Tests reached a result in four days.)
Scorecard

Pakistan	v	South Africa
181 (47 overs); Babar Azam 71 (79); Duanne Olivier 6/37 (14 overs)		223 (60 overs); Temba Bavuma 53 (87); Mohammad Amir 4/62 (20 overs)
190 (56 overs); Shan Masood 65 (120); Duanne Olivier 5/59 (15 overs)		151/4 (50.4 overs); Hashim Amla 63* (148); Shan Masood 1/6 (3 overs)

South Africa won by 6 wickets
Centurion Park, Centurion
Umpires: Bruce Oxenford (Aus) and Sundaram Ravi (Ind)
Player of the match: Duanne Olivier (SA)

- Pakistan won the toss and elected to bat.
- Dale Steyn became South Africa's leading wicket-taker in Tests, taking his 422nd wicket.
- Duanne Olivier (SA) took his first five-wicket haul and ten-wicket haul in Tests.
- Faf du Plessis (SA) and Sarfaraz Ahmed (Pak) failed to score any runs in the match. It was the first instance of both captains being dismissed for a pair in a completed Test.

=== 2nd Test ===
3–7 January 2019
Scorecard

Pakistan	v	South Africa
177 (51.1 overs); Sarfaraz Ahmed 56 (81); Duanne Olivier 4/48 (15 overs)		431 (124.1 overs); Faf du Plessis 103 (226); Mohammad Amir 4/88 (33 overs)
294 (70.4 overs); Asad Shafiq 88 (118); Kagiso Rabada 4/61 (16.4 overs)		43/1 (9.5 overs); Dean Elgar 24* (39); Mohammad Abbas 1/14 (4 overs)

South Africa won by 9 wickets
Newlands Cricket Ground, Cape Town
Umpires: Bruce Oxenford (Aus) and Joel Wilson (WI)
Player of the match: Faf du Plessis (SA)

- South Africa won the toss and elected to field.
- Quinton de Kock (SA) scored his 2,000th run in Tests.

=== 3rd Test ===
11–15 January 2019
Scorecard

South Africa	v	Pakistan
262 (77.4 overs); Aiden Markram 90 (124); Faheem Ashraf 3/57 (15 overs)		185 (49.4 overs); Sarfaraz Ahmed 50 (40); Duanne Olivier 5/51 (13 overs)
303 (80.3 overs); Quinton de Kock 129 (138); Shadab Khan 3/41 (11.3 overs)		273 (65.4 overs); Asad Shafiq 65 (71); Duanne Olivier 3/74 (15 overs)

South Africa won by 107 runs
Wanderers Stadium, Johannesburg
Umpires: Sundaram Ravi (Ind) and Joel Wilson (WI)
Player of the match: Quinton de Kock (SA)

- South Africa won the toss and elected to bat.
- Zubayr Hamza (SA) made his Test debut, and became South Africa's 100th Test player since readmission.
- Sarfaraz Ahmed (Pak) set a new record for the most dismissals by a wicket-keeper captain in a Test match, with ten.

== ODI series ==
=== 1st ODI ===
19 January 2019
13:00 (D/N)
Scorecard

South Africa; 266/2 (50 overs)	v	Pakistan; 267/5 (49.1 overs)
Hashim Amla 108* (120); Shadab Khan 1/41 (10 overs)		Imam-ul-Haq 86 (101); Duanne Olivier 2/73 (10 overs)

Pakistan won by 5 wickets
St. George's Park, Port Elizabeth
Umpires: Gregory Brathwaite (WI) and Allahudien Paleker (SA)
Player of the match: Mohammad Hafeez (Pak)

- South Africa won the toss and elected to bat.
- Duanne Olivier and Rassie van der Dussen (SA) both made their ODI debuts.

=== 2nd ODI ===
22 January 2019
13:00 (D/N)
Scorecard

Pakistan; 203 (45.5 overs)	v	South Africa; 207/5 (42 overs)
Hasan Ali 59 (45); Andile Phehlukwayo 4/22 (9.5 overs)		Rassie van der Dussen 80* (123); Shaheen Afridi 3/44 (9 overs)

South Africa won by 5 wickets
Kingsmead Cricket Ground, Durban
Umpires: Bongani Jele (SA) and Paul Reiffel (Aus)
Player of the match: Andile Phehlukwayo (SA)

- South Africa won the toss and elected to field.
- Hussain Talat (Pak) made his ODI debut.
- Sarfaraz Ahmed (Pak) played in his 100th ODI.

=== 3rd ODI ===
25 January 2019
13:00 (D/N)
Scorecard

Pakistan; 317/6 (50 overs)	v	South Africa; 187/2 (33 overs)
Imam-ul-Haq 101 (116); Dale Steyn 2/43 (10 overs)		Reeza Hendricks 83* (90); Hasan Ali 1/33 (6 overs)

South Africa won by 13 runs (DLS method)
Centurion Park, Centurion
Umpires: Gregory Brathwaite (WI) and Adrian Holdstock (SA)
Player of the match: Reeza Hendricks (SA)

- Pakistan won the toss and elected to bat.
- Rain during South Africa's innings prevented any further play.
- Beuran Hendricks (SA) made his ODI debut.
- Imam-ul-Haq (Pak) became the second fastest batsman, in terms of innings, to score 1,000 runs in ODIs (19).

=== 4th ODI ===
27 January 2019
10:00
Scorecard

South Africa; 164 (41 overs)	v	Pakistan; 168/2 (31.3 overs)
Hashim Amla 59 (75); Usman Shinwari 4/35 (7 overs)		Imam-ul-Haq 71 (91); Andile Phehlukwayo 1/17 (2.3 overs)

Pakistan won by 8 wickets
Wanderers Stadium, Johannesburg
Umpires: Bongani Jele (SA) and Paul Reiffel (Aus)
Player of the match: Usman Shinwari (Pak)

- Pakistan won the toss and elected to field.
- Quinton de Kock (SA) played in his 100th ODI.

=== 5th ODI ===
30 January 2019
13:00 (D/N)
Scorecard

Pakistan; 240/8 (50 overs)	v	South Africa; 241/3 (40 overs)
Fakhar Zaman 70 (73); Andile Phehlukwayo 2/42 (9 overs)		Quinton de Kock 83 (58); Shaheen Afridi 1/34 (7 overs)

South Africa won by 7 wickets
Newlands Cricket Ground, Cape Town
Umpires: Gregory Brathwaite (WI) and Adrian Holdstock (SA)
Player of the match: Quinton de Kock (SA)

- South Africa won the toss and elected to field.
- Andile Phehlukwayo (SA) took his 50th wicket in ODIs.

== T20I series ==
=== 1st T20I ===
1 February 2019
18:00 (N)
Scorecard

South Africa; 192/6 (20 overs)	v	Pakistan; 186/9 (20 overs)
Faf du Plessis 78 (45); Usman Shinwari 3/31 (4 overs)		Shoaib Malik 49 (31); Tabraiz Shamsi 2/33 (4 overs)

South Africa won by 6 runs
Newlands Cricket Ground, Cape Town
Umpires: Adrian Holdstock (SA) and Bongani Jele (SA)
Player of the match: David Miller (SA)

- Pakistan won the toss and elected to field.

=== 2nd T20I ===
3 February 2019
14:30
Scorecard

South Africa; 188/3 (20 overs)	v	Pakistan; 181/7 (20 overs)
David Miller 65* (29); Imad Wasim 1/9 (4 overs)		Babar Azam 90 (58); Andile Phehlukwayo 3/36 (4 overs)

South Africa won by 7 runs
Wanderers Stadium, Johannesburg
Umpires: Adrian Holdstock (SA) and Allahudien Paleker (SA)
Player of the match: David Miller (SA)

- Pakistan won the toss and elected to field.
- Janneman Malan and Lutho Sipamla (SA) both made their T20I debuts.
- David Miller captained South Africa for the first time in T20Is.
- This was Pakistan's first bilateral series loss since January 2016.

=== 3rd T20I ===
6 February 2019
18:00 (N)
Scorecard

Pakistan; 168/9 (20 overs)	v	South Africa; 141/9 (20 overs)
Mohammad Rizwan 26 (22); Beuran Hendricks 4/14 (4 overs)		Chris Morris 55* (29); Mohammad Amir 3/27 (4 overs)

Pakistan won by 27 runs
Centurion Park, Centurion
Umpires: Adrian Holdstock (SA) and Bongani Jele (SA)
Player of the match: Shadab Khan (Pak)

- South Africa won the toss and elected to field.
