= Mzansi Super League =

Cricket league

- Countries: South Africa
- Administrator: Cricket South Africa
- Format: Twenty20
- First edition: 2018
- Latest edition: 2019
- Number of teams: 6
- Most successful: Jozi Stars; Paarl Rocks (1 title each)
- Most runs: Reeza Hendricks (687)
- Most wickets: Duanne Olivier (27); Dale Steyn (27)
- Website: MSLT20

The Mzansi Super League (MSL) was a Twenty20 cricket (T20) franchise league held in South Africa. The competition was established in 2018 by Cricket South Africa (CSA) as a replacement for the failed T20 Global League, but only two editions were played before the competition was itself canceled. The SA20 competition, first held in 2023, could be seen as a successor to the MSL.

The first edition of the tournament took place in November and December 2018. The South African Broadcasting Corporation broadcast all matches domestically on free-to-air channels.

The league consisted of six franchise teams representing different South African cities. Two editions were played under this format before changes were proposed to reflect the wide structural changes that were announced for South African domestic cricket in 2021, but the competition did not run in 2020 or 2021 due to the COVID-19 pandemic and was then cancelled.

== Format ==
=== League structure ===
Each team played each other twice in a home-and-away round-robin format in the league phase. At the conclusion of the league stage, the top three teams qualified for the playoffs, with the team that topped the table after the league phase progressing to the final as the home team and the second and third placed teams played against each other in a play-off match, with the winner advancing to the final.

=== Player draft ===
Franchises acquired players by means of a player draft. A series of marquee players from the South African national team were drafted first, and teams could also select one international marquee player. After these picks, teams were allocated fourteen picks each with player salaries determined by the round in which they were selected.

== Teams ==
Six franchise teams representing different South African cities competed in the competition. These teams were loosely affiliated with the six franchise teams that played First Class and List-A cricket in the domestic circuit. The teams were:

- Tshwane Spartans
- Jozi Stars
- Nelson Mandela Bay Giants
- Durban Heat
- Cape Town Blitz
- Paarl Rocks

== League season and results ==
Edition	Season	Champions	Result of Final	Runner-up
1	2018	Jozi Stars; 115/2 (17.3 ovs)	Jozi Stars won by 8 wickets Scorecard	Cape Town Blitz; 113/7 (20 ovs)
2	2019	Paarl Rocks; 148/2 (14.2 ovs)	Paarl Rocks won by 8 wickets Scorecard	Tshwane Spartans; 147/6 (20 ovs)
