= 2021–22 CSA T20 Challenge =

Cricket tournament

- Dates: 7 – 27 February 2022
- Administrator: Cricket South Africa
- Cricket format: Twenty20
- Tournament format(s): Round-robin and knockout
- Host: South Africa
- Champions: Rocks (1st title)
- Runners-up: Titans
- Participants: 8
- Matches: 31
- Most runs: Pieter Malan (368)
- Most wickets: Tabraiz Shamsi (13)

The 2021–22 CSA T20 Challenge was a Twenty20 cricket tournament that took place in South Africa during February 2022. It replaced the planned 2022 edition of the Mzansi Super League, which was cancelled due to the COVID-19 pandemic. Imperial Lions were the defending champions.

Following the conclusion of the group stage matches, Titans, Western Province, Dolphins and Rocks all progressed to the semi-finals of the tournament. In the first semi-final, Titans beat Dolphins by six wickets to advance to the final. They were joined in the final by Rocks, who beat Western Province by seven wickets in their semi-final match. In the final, Rocks beat Titans by 15 runs to win the tournament.

== Background ==
The 2022 Mzansi Super League was scheduled to be the third edition of the Mzansi Super League (MSL) Twenty20 (T20) franchise cricket tournament in South Africa. It was originally scheduled to be held in November 2020, but was postponed until 2021 due to the COVID-19 pandemic. Two new teams were announced to be participating in the 2022 MSL season. However, in October 2021, five of the six previous teams were replaced by some of the teams from 2021–22 CSA Provincial T20 Knock-Out, after Cricket South Africa restructured its domestic setup.

In December 2021, Cricket South Africa confirmed that the 2022 MSL tournament had been cancelled due to COVID-19 concerns.

== Squads ==
The following squads were announced for the tournament.

Dolphins	Imperial Lions	Knights	North West	Rocks	Titans	Warriors	Western Province
Marques Ackerman (c); Bradley Porteous; Keegan Petersen; Sarel Erwee; Thamsanqa Khumalo; Bryce Parsons; Jason Smith; Khaya Zondo; Prenelan Subrayen; Grant Roelofsen; Ruan de Swardt; Daryn Dupavillon; Kerwin Mungroo; Odirile Modimokoane; Ottniel Baartman; Thando Ntini	Ryan Rickelton (c); Dominic Hendricks; Joshua Richards; Mitchell van Buuren; Shane Dadswell; Codi Yusuf; Kagiso Rapulana; Louren Steenkamp; Sisanda Magala; Ruan Haasbroek; Ayavuya Myoli; Carmi le Roux; Lutho Sipamla; Malusi Siboto; Tladi Bokako; Tshepo Ntuli	Pite van Biljon (c); Farhaan Behardien; Raynard van Tonder; Rilee Rossouw; Jacques Snyman; Matthew Kleinveldt; Migael Pretorius; Patrick Botha; Patrick Kruger; Dilivio Ridgaard; Mangaliso Mosehle; Wandile Makwetu; Alfred Mothoa; Gerald Coetzee; Gregory Mahlokwana; Mbulelo Budaza; Nealan van Heerden	Nicky van den Bergh (c); Christopher Britz; Lesego Senokwane; Tahir Isaacs; Wesley Marshall; Heinrich Pieterse; Senuran Muthusamy; Shaylen Pillay; Eben Botha; Jason Oakes; Caleb Seleka; Chad Classen; Duan Jansen; Eldred Hawken; Johannes Diseko; Lwandiswa Zuma	Pieter Malan (c); Christiaan Jonker; Janneman Malan; Ruan Terblanche; Ferisco Adams; Imran Manack; Shaun von Berg; Sinalo Gobeni; Clyde Fortuin; Hlomla Hanabe; Achille Cloete; Hardus Viljoen; Khanya Dilima; Siyabonga Mahima; Zakhele Qwabe; Ziyaad Abrahams	Dean Elgar (c); Donavon Ferreira; Grant Mokoena; Jiveshan Pillay; Sibonelo Makhanya; Corbin Bosch; Dayyaan Galiem; Neil Brand; Theunis de Bruyn; Gihahn Cloete; Jandré Pretorius; Aaron Phangiso; Ayabulela Gqamane; Bonga Chepkonga; Jarred Jardine; Junior Dala; Okuhle Cele; Simon Harmer	Sinethemba Qeshile (c); Edward Moore; Kabelo Sekhukhune; Lesiba Ngoepe; Matthew Breetzke; Tristan Stubbs; Alindile Mhletywa; Diego Rosier; JJ Smuts; Kyle Jacobs; Wihan Lubbe; Rudi Second; Glenton Stuurman; Marco Jansen; Mthiwekhaya Nabe; Tiaan van Vuuren; Tsepo Ndwandwa	Wayne Parnell (c); David Bedingham; Jonathan Bird; Jordan Woolf; Tony de Zorzi; Zubayr Hamza; Aviwe Mgijima; Kyle Simmonds; Mihlali Mpongwana; Daniel Smith; Kyle Verreynne; Basheer Walters; Beuran Hendricks; Nandre Burger; Tshepo Moreki; Yves Kamanzi

== Points table ==
Pos	Team	Pld	W	L	NR	Pts	NRR
1	Titans	7	6	1	0	24	0.751
2	Western Province	7	5	2	0	22	0.711
3	Dolphins	7	4	3	0	17	0.551
4	Rocks	7	4	3	0	17	0.207
5	North West	7	3	4	0	13	−0.398
6	Warriors	7	2	5	0	9	−0.180
7	Imperial Lions	7	2	5	0	8	−0.693
8	Knights	7	2	5	0	8	−1.101

Source: ESPN Cricinfo

Advanced to the Finals

== Fixtures ==
On 1 February 2022, Cricket South Africa confirmed all the fixtures for the tournament, with all the matches taking place at St George's Park in Port Elizabeth.

=== Round-robin ===
7 February 2022
Scorecard

Rocks; 142/6 (20 overs)	v	Western Province; 143/4 (17 overs)
Christiaan Jonker 46 (43); George Linde 2/13 (4 overs)		Richard Levi 67 (39); Hardus Viljoen 3/16 (3 overs)

Western Province won by 6 wickets
St George's Park, Port Elizabeth
Umpires: Brad White and Shaun George

- Rocks won the toss and elected to bat.
- Gavin Kaplan (Western Province) made his T20 debut.

7 February 2022
Scorecard

Warriors; 163/8 (20 overs)	v	Titans; 155/8 (20 overs)
Wihan Lubbe 56 (46); Lizaad Williams 2/29 (4 overs)		Donavon Ferreira 60* (40); Wihan Lubbe 2/15 (2 overs)

Warriors won by 8 runs
St George's Park, Port Elizabeth
Umpires: Abdoellah Steenkamp and Barry Smith

- Titans won the toss and elected to field.

8 February 2022
Scorecard

North West; 136/6 (20 overs)	v	Imperial Lions; 125/5 (20 overs)
Duan Jansen 32* (18); Codi Yusuf 2/21 (4 overs)		Mitchell Van Buuren 65* (56); Johannes Diseko 2/17 (4 overs)

North West won by 11 runs
St George's Park, Port Elizabeth
Umpires: Abongile Sodumo and Philip Vosloo

- Lions won the toss and elected to field.

8 February 2022
Scorecard

Knights; 128/5 (20 overs)	v	Dolphins; 130/2 (18 overs)
Raynard van Tonder 38 (35); Prenelan Subrayen 1/13 (4 overs)		Keegan Petersen 45 (37); Alfred Mothoa 1/21 (4 overs)

Dolphins won by 8 wickets
St George's Park, Port Elizabeth
Umpires: Mazizi Gampu and Ryan Hendricks

- Knights won the toss and elected to bat.

9 February 2022
Scorecard

Titans; 158/2 (20 overs)	v	Rocks; 155/8 (20 overs)
Quinton de Kock 72 (61); Zakhele Qwabe 1/29 (3 overs)		Janneman Malan 45 (31); Junior Dala 3/36 (4 overs)

Titans won by 3 runs
St George's Park, Port Elizabeth
Umpires: Dennis Smith and Shaun George

- Rocks won the toss and elected to field.

9 February 2022
Scorecard

Warriors; 163/5 (20 overs)	v	Western Province; 164/3 (17.1 overs)
Wihan Lubbe 69* (59); Wayne Parnell 1/25 (4 overs)		Richard Levi 40 (17); Mthiwekhaya Nabe 2/18 (3 overs)

Western Province won by 7 wickets
St George's Park, Port Elizabeth
Umpires: Mazizi Gampu and Philip Vosloo

- Warriors won the toss and elected to bat.

10 February 2022
Scorecard

Knights; 94/9 (20 overs)	v	North West; 95/2 (10.1 overs)
Patrick Kruger 20 (19); Senuran Muthusamy 2/8 (4 overs)		Wesley Marshall 43 (29); Gregory Mahlokwana 1/14 (2.1 overs)

North West won by 8 wickets
St George's Park, Port Elizabeth
Umpires: Abongile Sodumo and Ryan Hendricks

- North West won the toss and elected to field.
- Jason Raubenheimer (Knights) made his T20 debut.

10 February 2022
Scorecard

Imperial Lions; 156/8 (20 overs)	v	Dolphins; 148/8 (20 overs)
Shane Dadswell 42 (28); Jason Smith 3/16 (3 overs)		Jason Smith 39 (34); Bjorn Fortuin 2/16 (4 overs)

Lions won by 8 runs
St George's Park, Port Elizabeth
Umpires: Abdoellah Steenkamp and Brad White

- Lions won the toss and elected to bat.

12 February 2022
Scorecard

Dolphins; 211/5 (20 overs)	v	Warriors; 191/6 (20 overs)
David Miller 58 (26); JJ Smuts 1/22 (4 overs)		Tristan Stubbs 80* (31); Jason Smith 3/24 (2 overs)

Dolphins won by 20 runs
St George's Park, Port Elizabeth
Umpires: Abdoellah Steenkamp and Philip Vosloo

- Warriors won the toss and elected to field.
- Alindile Mhletywa and Stefan Tait (Warriors) both made their T20 debuts.

12 February 2022
Scorecard

Titans; 151/6 (20 overs)	v	Knights; 124 (19 overs)
Heinrich Klaasen 59* (41); Patrick Kruger 2/18 (3 overs)		Migael Pretorius 27 (18); Lizaad Williams 2/20 (4 overs); Aaron Phangiso 2/20 (4 overs)

Titans won by 27 runs
St George's Park, Port Elizabeth
Umpires: Brad White and Mazizi Gampu

- Titans won the toss and elected to bat.

13 February 2022
Scorecard

Imperial Lions; 140/5 (20 overs)	v	Western Province; 141/5 (19.1 overs)
Mitchell Van Buuren 44 (34); Junaid Dawood 2/23 (4 overs)		Tony de Zorzi 42 (31); Codi Yusuf 1/20 (4 overs)

Western Province won by 5 wickets
St George's Park, Port Elizabeth
Umpires: Ryan Hendricks and Shaun George

- Western Province won the toss and elected to field.

13 February 2022
Scorecard

Rocks; 182/6 (20 overs)	v	North West; 182/3 (20 overs)
Pieter Malan 53 (46); Caleb Seleka 2/20 (4 overs)		Dwaine Pretorius 74* (51); Siyabonga Mahima 1/25 (4 overs)

Match tied
(Rocks won the Super Over)
St George's Park, Port Elizabeth
Umpires: Abongile Sodumo and Dennis Smith

- Rocks won the toss and elected to bat.

14 February 2022
Scorecard

Dolphins; 134/4 (19 overs)	v	Titans; 137/3 (16.3 overs)
David Miller 57 (40); Junior Dala 2/27 (4 overs)		Dewald Brevis 46* (30); Thando Ntini 2/21 (4 overs)

Titans won by 7 wickets
St George's Park, Port Elizabeth
Umpires: Abongile Sodumo and Brad White

- Titans won the toss and elected to field.

14 February 2022
Scorecard

Warriors; 170/5 (20 overs)	v	Knights; 173/1 (18.4 overs)
Tristan Stubbs 65 (35); Jacques Snyman 2/23 (3 overs)		Jacques Snyman 90 (52); Mthiwekhaya Nabe 1/38 (4 overs)

Knights won by 9 wickets
St George's Park, Port Elizabeth
Umpires: Philip Vosloo and Shaun George

- Warriors won the toss and elected to bat.
- Christoffel Klijnhans (Knights) made his T20 debut.

15 February 2022
Scorecard

Rocks; 160/4 (20 overs)	v	Imperial Lions; 116 (17.2 overs)
Pieter Malan 71 (49); Reeza Hendricks 1/10 (2 overs)		Reeza Hendricks 46 (39); Shaun von Berg 3/14 (4 overs)

Rocks won by 44 runs
St George's Park, Port Elizabeth
Umpires: Abdoellah Steenkamp and Ryan Hendricks

- Lions won the toss and elected to field.

15 February 2022
Scorecard

North West; 164/8 (20 overs)	v	Western Province; 80 (17.4 overs)
Jonathan Bird 53 (44); Senuran Muthusamy 4/20 (4 overs)		Caleb Seleka 16 (23); Beuran Hendricks 4/20 (4 overs)

Western Province won by 84 runs
St George's Park, Port Elizabeth
Umpires: Dennis Smith and Mazizi Gampu

- Western Province won the toss and elected to field.
- Tahir Isaacs (North West) made his T20 debut.

17 February 2022
Scorecard

Imperial Lions; 148/6 (20 overs)	v	Titans; 152/3 (18.1 overs)
Reeza Hendricks 41 (37); Tabraiz Shamsi 2/25 (4 overs)		Theunis de Bruyn 63* (51); Malusi Siboto 2/21 (3.1 overs)

Titans won by 7 wickets
St George's Park, Port Elizabeth
Umpires: Bongani Jele and Shaun George

- Lions won the toss and elected to bat.

17 February 2022
Scorecard

Warriors; 155/6 (20 overs)	v	Rocks; 160/7 (19.4 overs)
Tristan Stubbs 47 (30); Shaun von Berg 3/26 (4 overs)		Michael Copeland 40 (38); Akhona Mnyaka 2/27 (3 overs)

Rocks won by 3 wickets
St George's Park, Port Elizabeth
Umpires: Allahudien Paleker and Arno Jacobs

- Warriors won the toss and elected to bat.

18 February 2022
Scorecard

Knights; 126/8 (20 overs)	v	Western Province; 130/4 (15.5 overs)
Pite van Biljon 40 (35); Junaid Dawood 3/28 (4 overs)		Jonathan Bird 43 (35); Alfred Mothoa 2/30 (4 overs)

Western Province won by 6 wickets
St George's Park, Port Elizabeth
Umpires: Brad White and Dennis Smith

- Western Province won the toss and elected to field.

18 February 2022
Scorecard

North West; 135/8 (20 overs)	v	Dolphins; 136/3 (18.4 overs)
Nicky van den Bergh 52 (37); Eathan Bosch 3/20 (4 overs)		Keegan Petersen 43 (36); Senuran Muthusamy 1/15 (3 overs)

Dolphins won by 7 wickets
St George's Park, Port Elizabeth
Umpires: Lubabalo Gcuma and Stephen Harris

- Dolphins won the toss and elected to field.

19 February 2022
Scorecard

Western Province; 140/5 (20 overs)	v	Titans; 144/3 (19.3 overs)
Dane Vilas 60* (48); Lizaad Williams 2/21 (4 overs)		Theunis de Bruyn 37 (29); Basheeru-Deen Walters 1/17 (3 overs)

Titans won by 7 wickets
St George's Park, Port Elizabeth
Umpires: Bongani Jele and Lubabalo Gcuma

- Titans won the toss and elected to field.

19 February 2022
Scorecard

Imperial Lions; 142/6 (20 overs)	v	Warriors; 144/5 (15.5 overs)
Reeza Hendricks 61 (41); Tsepo Ndwandwa 2/12 (3 overs)		Wihan Lubbe 46 (30); Malusi Siboto 2/21 (2 overs)

Warriors won by 5 wickets
St George's Park, Port Elizabeth
Umpires: Shaun George and Stephen Harris

- Warriors won the toss and elected to field.

20 February 2022
Scorecard

Rocks; 119/9 (20 overs)	v	Dolphins; 111/9 (20 overs)
Pieter Malan 33 (30); Eathan Bosch 3/23 (4 overs)		Khaya Zondo 24 (23); Ziyaad Abrahams 3/22 (4 overs)

Rocks won by 8 runs
St George's Park, Port Elizabeth
Umpires: Arno Jacobs and Brad White

- Dolphins won the toss and elected to field.

20 February 2022
Scorecard

Knights; 127/8 (20 overs)	v	Imperial Lions; 130/5 (19.1 overs)
Jacques Snyman 39 (27); Malusi Siboto 3/18 (3 overs)		Mitchell Van Buuren 67* (55); Alfred Mothoa 2/20 (4 overs)

Lions won by 5 wickets
St George's Park, Port Elizabeth
Umpires: Allahudien Paleker and Dennis Smith

- Knights won the toss and elected to bat.

22 February 2022
Scorecard

Titans; 167/4 (20 overs)	v	North West; 134/7 (20 overs)
Heinrich Klaasen 54* (41); Senuran Muthusamy 2/14 (4 overs)		Lesego Senokwane 31 (32); Aaron Phangiso 2/13 (4 overs)

Titans won by 33 runs
St George's Park, Port Elizabeth
Umpires: Arno Jacobs and Dennis Smith

- North West won the toss and elected to field.

22 February 2022
Scorecard

Knights; 164/6 (20 overs)	v	Rocks; 161/2 (20 overs)
Christoffel Klijnhans 52 (47); Ziyaad Abrahams 5/34 (4 overs)		Pieter Malan 60* (51); Patrick Kruger 1/9 (1 over)

Knights won by 3 runs
St George's Park, Port Elizabeth
Umpires: Lubabalo Gcuma and Shaun George

- Knights won the toss and elected to bat.

23 February 2022
Scorecard

Dolphins; 148/5 (20 overs)	v	Western Province; 83 (15.4 overs)
Khaya Zondo 59* (51); George Linde 2/24 (4 overs)		Aviwe Mgijima 18 (12); Bryce Parsons 3/22 (3.4 overs)

Dolphins won by 65 runs
St George's Park, Port Elizabeth
Umpires: Bongani Jele and Stephen Harris

- Western Province won the toss and elected to field.

23 February 2022
Scorecard

North West; 169/5 (20 overs)	v	Warriors; 159/9 (20 overs)
Heino Kuhn 78 (57); Akhona Mnyaka 1/21 (2 overs)		Lesiba Ngoepe 43 (28); Lwandiswa Zuma 3/25 (3 overs)

North West won by 10 runs
St George's Park, Port Elizabeth
Umpires: Allahudien Paleker and Brad White

- North West won the toss and elected to bat.

== Finals ==
1st semi-final
25 February 2022
Scorecard

Dolphins; 93/8 (20 overs)	v	Titans; 94/4 (14.1 overs)
Khaya Zondo 33 (33); Tabraiz Shamsi 3/15 (4 overs)		Dewald Brevis 38 (30); Kerwin Mungroo 3/21 (4 overs)

Titans won by 6 wickets
St George's Park, Port Elizabeth
Umpires: Lubabalo Gcuma and Stephen Harris

- Titans won the toss and elected to field.

2nd semi-final
25 February 2022
Scorecard

Western Province; 118 (19.5 overs)	v	Rocks; 121/3 (18.1 overs)
Gavin Kaplan 31 (31); Ziyaad Abrahams 4/34 (3.5 overs)		Pieter Malan 57 (57); Aviwe Mgijima 2/15 (3 overs)

Rocks won by 7 wickets
St George's Park, Port Elizabeth
Umpires: Arno Jacobs and Brad White

- Western Province won the toss and elected to bat.

Final
27 February 2022
Scorecard

Rocks; 138/6 (20 overs)	v	Titans; 123/9 (20 overs)
Pieter Malan 71 (56); Tabraiz Shamsi 3/20 (4 overs)		Sibonelo Makhanya 37 (31); Hardus Viljoen 2/14 (3 overs)

Rocks won by 15 runs
St George's Park, Port Elizabeth
Umpires: Allahudien Paleker and Bongani Jele

- Rocks won the toss and elected to bat.
