= 2018–19 CSA 3-Day Provincial Cup =

Cricket tournament

- Dates: 4 October 2018 – 14 April 2019
- Administrator(s): Cricket South Africa
- Cricket format: First-class
- Tournament format(s): Round-robin
- Champions: (South Africa) Eastern Province (South Africa) Northerns
- Participants: 13
- Most runs: Obus Pienaar (957)
- Most wickets: Glenton Stuurman (39)

The 2018–19 CSA 3-Day Provincial Cup was a first-class cricket competition that took place in South Africa from 4 October 2018 to 14 April 2019. This was the first edition of the tournament not to be sponsored by Sunfoil, after they decided not to renew their sponsorship.

The competition was played between the thirteen South African provincial teams. In previous editions of the competition, Namibia had also competed. However, in October 2018 they withdrew from South Africa's provincial competitions, citing issues around costs and logistics.

Unlike its counterpart, the CSA Franchise 4-Day Cup, the matches were three days in length instead of four. The tournament was played in parallel with the 2018–19 CSA Provincial One-Day Challenge, a List A competition which featured the same teams. KwaZulu-Natal were the defending champions.

Eastern Province and Northerns contested the final, which finished as a draw, therefore the title was shared.

== Points table ==
Pool A

Team	Pld	W	L	D	NR	Pts
(South Africa) Eastern Province	10	4	0	6	0	178.68
(South Africa) Gauteng	10	5	1	4	0	172.94
(South Africa) Free State	10	2	2	6	0	131.62
(South Africa) Easterns	10	2	2	6	0	124.48
(South Africa) Boland	10	2	3	4	1	119.28
(South Africa) KwaZulu-Natal Inland	10	1	1	7	1	113.42

Team qualified for the final

Pool B

Team	Pld	W	L	D	NR	Pts
(South Africa) Northerns	10	3	1	6	0	168.84
(South Africa) Western Province	10	3	3	4	0	141.52
(South Africa) South Western Districts	10	2	2	6	0	124.04
(South Africa) KwaZulu-Natal	10	2	2	6	0	123.04
(South Africa) North West	10	3	5	2	0	101.10
(South Africa) Border	10	1	4	5	0	94.86
(South Africa) Northern Cape	10	1	5	4	0	83.92

Team qualified for the final

== Fixtures ==
=== October 2018 ===
4–6 October 2018
Scorecard

Boland (South Africa)	v	(South Africa) Easterns
186 (48.3 overs); Sinalo Gobeni 35 (36); Clayton August 4/31 (14 overs)		245 (71.1 overs); Wesley Marshall 93 (129); Nkululeko Serame 2/6 (4.1 overs)
290 (59.2 overs); Simon Khomari 61 (81); Rowan Richards 3/48 (10.2 overs)		234/4 (54.5 overs); Grant Thomson 108* (111); Kyle Simmonds 1/25 (5 overs)

Easterns won by 6 wickets
Willowmoore Park, Benoni
Umpires: Siphelele Gasa and Clifford Isaacs

- Easterns won the toss and elected to field.

4–6 October 2018
Scorecard

Gauteng (South Africa)	v	(South Africa) KwaZulu-Natal Inland
366 (93 overs); Joshua Richards 104 (200); Graham Hume 3/48 (20 overs)		397 (113.3 overs); Luke Schlemmer 119 (215); Sean Jamison 2/32 (13 overs)
182/5 (43 overs); Martin Coetzee 42 (72); Lwandiswa Zuma 2/30 (10 overs)

Match drawn
Walter Milton Oval, Johannesburg
Umpires: Ryan Hendricks and Philip Vosloo

- Gauteng won the toss and elected to bat.
- Martin Coetzee and Joshua Richards (Gauteng) both made their first-class debuts.

11–13 October 2018
Scorecard

Border (South Africa)	v	(South Africa) KwaZulu-Natal
130 (44.2 overs); Jason Niemand 29 (96); Tyron Koen 3/27 (9.2 overs)		223 (57.2 overs); Blayde Capell 98 (143); Phaphama Fojela 4/43 (14.2 overs)
126/5 (61 overs); Jason Niemand 70 (132); Keith Dudgeon 2/20 (16.5 overs)

Match drawn
Kingsmead, Durban
Umpires: Clifford Isaacs and Jurie Sadler

- KwaZulu-Natal won the toss and elected to field.
- Bradley Porteous (KwaZulu-Natal) and Lizo Makhosi (Border) both made their first-class debuts.

11–13 October 2018
Scorecard

Western Province (South Africa)	v	(South Africa) Easterns
303 (77 overs); Matthew Kleinveldt 109 (169); Ryan Cartwright 5/49 (17 overs)		217 (72.5 overs); Wesley Marshall 50 (70); R Meyer 4/36 (15 overs)
297/4d (68 overs); Jack Newby 132 (220); Matthew Arnold 2/78 (21 overs)		258/9 (80 overs); Grant Thomson 108 (139); George Linde 3/76 (25 overs)

Match drawn
Newlands, Cape Town
Umpires: Lubabalo Gcuma and Marlon Jansen

- Easterns won the toss and elected to field.
- Thulani Thembela (Easterns) made his first-class debut.

11–13 October 2018
Scorecard

Eastern Province (South Africa)	v	(South Africa) North West
274 (92 overs); Tian Koekemoer 116 (231); Marco Jansen 5/53 (19 overs)		87 (33.2 overs); Brady Barends 25 (43); Glenton Stuurman 5/24 (12 overs)
6/0 (1 over); Joshua van Heerden 4* (2)		192 (59.5 overs) (f/o); Ruan Haasbroek 47 (88); Tian Koekemoer 6/48 (14.5 overs)

Eastern Province won by 10 wickets
St George's Park, Port Elizabeth
Umpires: Rudi Birkenstock and Siphelele Gasa

- North West won the toss and elected to field.
- Joshua van Heerden (Eastern Province), Marco Jansen and Jon Hinrichsen (North West) all made their first-class debuts.

11–13 October 2018
Scorecard

Northerns (South Africa)	v	(South Africa) Free State
463/6d (100 overs); Jonathan Vandiar 139 (146); Thandolwethu Mnyaka 3/66 (18 overs)		316 (89.4 overs); Wihan Victor 108 (165); Sammy Mofokeng 4/47 (16.4 overs)
156/0 (42.1 overs); Neil Brand 85* (132)

Match drawn
Mangaung Oval, Bloemfontein
Umpires: Ryan Hendricks and Philip Vosloo

- Northerns won the toss and elected to bat.
- Dilivio Ridgaard (Free State) and Gideon Peters (Northerns) both made their first-class debuts.

18–20 October 2018
Scorecard

Gauteng (South Africa)	v	(South Africa) Easterns
211 (68 overs); Delano Potgieter 55 (86); Rowan Richards 5/40 (18 overs)		149 (47.5 overs); Matthew Arnold 36* (40); Ayavuya Myoli 4/30 (12 overs)
241 (49.5 overs); Joshua Richards 75 (98); Ryan Cartwright 4/58 (15 overs)		298 (82.1 overs); Wesley Marshall 116 (179); Nandre Burger 4/58 (21.1 overs)

Gauteng won by 5 runs
Willowmoore Park, Benoni
Umpires: Thomas Mokorosi and Dennis Smith

- Easterns won the toss and elected to field.
- Juan Landsberg (Gauteng) made his first-class debut.

18–20 October 2018
Scorecard

North West (South Africa)	v	(South Africa) KwaZulu-Natal
205 (60 overs); Marco Jansen 66 (100); Keith Dudgeon 6/42 (16 overs)		369 (92.4 overs); Marques Ackerman 77 (88); Hlompo Modimokwane 3/41 (10.4 overs)
346 (75.2 overs); Wihan Lubbe 115 (143); Daryn Dupavillon 5/93 (21 overs)		115 (36.5 overs); Keith Dudgeon 28* (38); Marco Jansen 4/35 (13.5 overs)

North West won by 67 runs
Senwes Park, Potchefstroom
Umpires: Johan Cloete and Murray Brown

- KwaZulu-Natal won the toss and elected to field.
- Hlompo Modimokwane (North West) made his first-class debut.

18–20 October 2018
Scorecard

Northern Cape (South Africa)	v	(South Africa) Western Province
201 (51 overs); Keegan Petersen 55 (79); Justin Dill 5/43 (19 overs)		502/4d (131.4 overs); Matthew Kleinveldt 166 (276); Akhona Kula 2/117 (28 overs)
308 (98.2 overs); Keegan Petersen 108 (183); Justin Dill 5/69 (23.2 overs)		8/0 (2.3 overs); Jack Newby 5* (9 overs)

Western Province won by 10 wickets
Newlands, Cape Town
Umpires: Ryan Hendricks and Abdoellah Steenkamp

- Western Province won the toss and elected to field.

25–27 October 2018
Scorecard

KwaZulu-Natal Inland (South Africa)	v	(South Africa) Eastern Province
268 (79 overs); Grant Roelofsen 109 (180); Glenton Stuurman 3/30 (19 overs)		263 (84.2 overs); Thomas Kaber 68 (157); Graham Hume 3/65 (19 overs)
302 (90 overs); Luke Schlemmer 132 (229); Thomas Kaber 5/35 (8 overs)		109/2 (38 overs); Onke Nyaku 57* (95); Attie Maposa 1/2 (5 overs)

Match drawn
St George's Park, Port Elizabeth
Umpires: Arno Jacobs and Jurie Sadler

- Eastern Province won the toss and elected to field.

25–27 October 2018
Scorecard

Gauteng (South Africa)	v	(South Africa) Free State
344 (98.5 overs); Tshepang Dithole 107 (153); Thandolwethu Mnyaka 4/99 (26.4 overs)		462/9d (137.2 overs); Raynard van Tonder 250* (364); Delano Potgieter 3/66 (28 overs)
66/3 (26 overs); Joshua Richards 26 (51); Thandolwethu Mnyaka 1/6 (7 overs)

Match drawn
Mangaung Oval, Bloemfontein
Umpires: Dennis Smith and Marlon Jansen

- Gauteng won the toss and elected to bat.

25–27 October 2018
Scorecard

Boland (South Africa)	v	(South Africa) South Western Districts
257 (88.2 overs); Daniel Sincuba 75 (172); Marcello Piedt 5/63 (21.2 overs)		380 (102.4 overs); Obus Pienaar 108 (166); Lizaad Williams 4/82 (23 overs)
229/5d (78.4 overs); Cebo Tshiki 56 (211); Kirwin Christoffels 1/28 (9 overs)

Match drawn
Boland Park, Paarl
Umpires: Clifford Isaacs and Abdoellah Steenkamp

- South Western Districts won the toss and elected to field.
- Yamkela Oliphant and Marco de Kock (South Western Districts) both made their first-class debuts.

=== November 2018 ===
1–3 November 2018
Scorecard

Northern Cape (South Africa)	v	(South Africa) Northerns
102 (35.3 overs); Giovanni Joseph 36 (90); Junior Dala 4/32 (11.3 overs)		405/4d (81.4 overs); Andrea Agathangelou 182 (220); Kagiso Mohale 2/70 (17 overs)
163 (38 overs); Jacques Snyman 92 (98); Junior Dala 4/30 (8 overs)

Northerns won by an innings and 140 runs
Centurion Park, Centurion
Umpires: Johan Cloete and Kevin Lawrence

- Northerns won the toss and elected to field.
- Ruan de Swardt (Northerns) and Mtabozuko Nqam (Northern Cape) both made their first-class debuts.

1–3 November 2018
Scorecard

KwaZulu-Natal (South Africa)	v	(South Africa) Free State
39/1 (22 overs); Mishkal Ramsaroop 19 (41); Nealan van Heerden 1/15 (6 overs)

Match drawn
Chatsworth Stadium, Durban
Umpires: Lubabalo Gcuma and Marlon Jansen

- Free State won the toss and elected to field.
- No play was possible on days 1 and 2 due to rain.
- Siphamandla Mavanda (Free State) made his first-class debut.

1–3 November 2018
Scorecard

Border (South Africa)	v	(South Africa) Eastern Province
194 (54.4 overs); Jason Niemand 37 (91); Glenton Stuurman 4/46 (17 overs)		371/9d (125 overs); Thomas Kaber 81 (177); Clayton Bosch 3/37 (17 overs)
371/9d (125 overs); Thomas Kaber 81 (177); Clayton Bosch 3/37 (17 overs)		261 (64.4 overs); Mncedisi Malika 55 (69); Tian Koekemoer 5/39 (19 overs)

Eastern Province won by 6 wickets
St George's Park, Port Elizabeth
Umpires: Arno Jacobs and Jurie Sadler

- Border won the toss and elected to bat.

1–3 November 2018
Scorecard

South Western Districts (South Africa)	v	(South Africa) KwaZulu-Natal Inland
256/8d (63 overs); Niel Hornbuckle 73 (87); Graham Hume 4/50 (16 overs)		66/2 (14.1 overs); Johnny Riekert 30* (32); Hershell America 1/3 (1.1 overs)

Match drawn
City Oval, Pietermaritzburg
Umpires: Dennis Smith and Ryan Hendricks

- KwaZulu-Natal Inland won the toss and elected to field.
- No play was possible on days 1 and 2 due to rain.
- Stefan Tait (South Western Districts) made his first-class debut.

8–10 November 2018
Scorecard

South Western Districts (South Africa)	v	(South Africa) Western Province
220 (60 overs); Yamkela Oliphant 69* (81); Mpilo Njoloza 3/34 (14 overs)		229 (78.3 overs); Qaasim Adams 108 (198); Hershell America 4/43 (18 overs)
328/3d (81 overs); Jean du Plessis 116* (181); Matthew Kleinveldt 1/73 (18 overs)		172 (73.3 overs); Qaasim Adams 45 (122); Hershell America 3/22 (12 overs)

South Western Districts won by 147 runs
Recreation Ground, Oudtshoorn
Umpires: Murray Brown and Abdoellah Steenkamp

- South Western Districts won the toss and elected to bat.

8–10 November 2018
Scorecard

Northerns (South Africa)	v	(South Africa) KwaZulu-Natal Inland
321 (87.1 overs); Neil Brand 72 (164); Attie Maposa 3/71 (18 overs)		119 (33.3 overs); Joel Veeran 35 (47); Ruben Trumpelmann 3/27 (7 overs)
		186 (52 overs) (f/o); Johnny Riekert 61 (120); Junior Dala 6/35 (15 overs)

Northerns won by an innings and 16 runs
Centurion Park, Centurion
Umpires: Rudi Birkenstock and Marlon Jansen

- KwaZulu-Natal Inland won the toss and elected to field.
- Josh van Eeden (KwaZulu-Natal Inland) made his first-class debut.

8–10 November 2018
Scorecard

Gauteng (South Africa)	v	(South Africa) North West
438 (81.2 overs); Joshua Richards 145 (201); Jovuan van Wyngaardt 4/41 (9.2 overs)		164 (40.3 overs); Brady Barends 34 (37); Aristides Karvelas 6/71 (15.3 overs)
14/0 (3 overs); Tshepang Dithole 9* (12)		285 (71.1 overs) (f/o); Marco Jansen 87 (101); Delano Potgieter 4/63 (18.1 overs)

Gauteng won by 10 wickets
Senwes Park, Potchefstroom
Umpires: Kevin Lawrence and Siphelele Gasa

- North West won the toss and elected to field.
- Shane Dadswell (North West) and Aristides Karvelas (Gauteng) both made their first-class debuts.

15–17 November 2018
Scorecard

Free State (South Africa)	v	(South Africa) Easterns
260 (68 overs); Janko Dreyer 52 (81); Clayton August 3/40 (13 overs); Imran Manack 3/40 (13 overs)		159 (59.5 overs); Matthew Arnold 62* (112); Nealan van Heerden 5/33 (13 overs)
246/3d (66 overs); Paballo Mogoera 115 (213); Matthew Arnold 2/50 (11 overs)		170 (73.1 overs); Kabelo Sekhukhune 65 (198); Thandolwethu Mnyaka 4/42 (16 overs)

Free State won by 177 runs
Willowmoore Park, Benoni
Umpires: Stephen Rex and Philip Vosloo

- Easterns won the toss and elected to field.

15–17 November 2018
Scorecard

Boland (South Africa)	v	(South Africa) Northern Cape
238 (74.4 overs); Daniel Sincuba 44 (128); Kagiso Mohale 5/47 (16.1 overs)		481/7d (104 overs); Aubrey Swanepoel 136 (123); Nkululeko Serame 4/117 (26 overs)
175 (43.1 overs); Cebo Tshiki 59 (96); Aubrey Swanepoel 5/44 (17 overs)

Northern Cape won by an innings and 68 runs
Diamond Oval, Kimberley
Umpires: Gawie Botha and Ryan Hendricks

- Boland won the toss and elected to bat.
- Tristan Traugott and Nangomso Mqaleni (Northern Cape) both made their first-class debuts.

22–24 November 2018
Scorecard

North West (South Africa)	v	(South Africa) Border
199 (53.2 overs); Brady Barends 50 (80); Phaphama Fojela 4/56 (14 overs)		75 (29.3 overs); Phaphama Fojela 16 (17); Craig Alexander 4/8 (9.3 overs)
153 (35.5 overs); Ruan Haasbroek 70* (91); Phaphama Fojela 5/39 (11 overs)		247 (69.3 overs); Mncedisi Malika 49 (76); Craig Alexander 6/71 (18.3 overs)

North West won by 30 runs
Buffalo Park, East London
Umpires: Thomas Mokorosi and N Gampu

- Border won the toss and elected to field.
- Sihle Magongoma (Border) made his first-class debut.

22–24 November 2018
Scorecard

South Western Districts (South Africa)	v	(South Africa) Northerns
296 (84.2 overs); Obus Pienaar 90 (165); Gideon Peters 4/37 (6.2 overs)		201 (78.2 overs); Rivaldo Moonsamy 52 (118); Niel Hornbuckle 4/28 (17.2 overs)
207/6d (61 overs); Brendon Louw 62 (109); Gionne Koopman 2/37 (20 overs)		263/9 (84 overs); Diego Rosier 108 (164); Marcello Piedt 4/59 (21 overs)

Match drawn
Recreation Ground, Oudtshoorn
Umpires: Jurie Sadler and Godwin Von Willingh

- South Western Districts won the toss and elected to bat.

22–24 November 2018
Scorecard

KwaZulu-Natal Inland (South Africa)	v	(South Africa) KwaZulu-Natal
209 (78.5 overs); Cody Chetty 63 (59); Thula Ngcobo 4/39 (23 overs)		117 (39 overs); Blayde Capell 33 (44); Lwandiswa Zuma 4/18 (9 overs)
141/8d (46 overs); Cody Chetty 39 (40); Keith Dudgeon 7/57 (20 overs)		158/7 (58 overs); Marques Ackerman 66* (116); Kurtlyn Mannikam 4/35 (15 overs)

Match drawn
City Oval, Pietermaritzburg
Umpires: Siphelele Gasa and Bongani Ntshebe

- KwaZulu-Natal won the toss and elected to field.

29 November–1 December 2018
Scorecard

Northern Cape (South Africa)	v	(South Africa) South Western Districts
213 (76 overs); Keegan Petersen 68 (114); Marcello Piedt 6/35 (19 overs)		452/6d (112.5 overs); Obus Pienaar 150* (162); Mbulelo Budaza 2/73 (19 overs)
262/6d (105 overs); Luthando Mnyanda 55 (81); Marcello Piedt 3/51 (22 overs)

Match drawn
Recreation Ground, Oudtshoorn
Umpires: Jan Erasmus and Stephen Rex

- South Western Districts won the toss and elected to field.

=== December 2018 ===
6–8 December 2018
Scorecard

South Western Districts (South Africa)	v	(South Africa) Border
168 (44.3 overs); Niel Hornbuckle 76 (72); Sithembile Langa 4/59 (11.3 overs)		252 (78 overs Mncedisi Malika 61 (104); Bradley de Villiers 3/37 (16 overs)
232 (61.1 overs); Obus Pienaar 50 (112); Basheeru-Deen Walters 6/94 (22.1 overs)		149/8 (55.1 overs); Mncedisi Malika 37 (59); Bradley de Villiers 3/61 (17 overs)

Border won by 2 wickets
Buffalo Park, East London
Umpires: Kevin Lawrence and Jurie Sadler

- Border won the toss and elected to field.

13–15 December 2018
Scorecard

Eastern Province (South Africa)	v	(South Africa) KwaZulu-Natal
392/6d (109 overs); Kelly Smuts 76* (113); Prenelan Subrayen 5/113 (40 overs)		304 (74 overs); Marques Ackerman 136 (134); Glenton Stuurman 4/50 (18 overs)
220/5d (59 overs); Edward Moore 69 (88); Prenelan Subrayen 3/99 (26 overs)		36/3 (10.5 overs); Michael Erlank 19 (44); Onke Nyaku 1/3 (0.5 overs)

Match drawn
Chatsworth Stadium, Durban
Umpires: Sinethemba Mjekula and Murray Brown

- Eastern Province won the toss and elected to bat.

13–15 December 2018
Scorecard

Free State (South Africa)	v	(South Africa) KwaZulu-Natal Inland
183 (59 overs); Janko Dreyer 97* (164); Attie Maposa 3/37 (9 overs)		372/9d (123 overs); Grant Roelofsen 125* (228); Thandolwethu Mnyaka 3/54 (23 overs)
200/3 (66 overs); Patrick Botha 60* (83); Attie Maposa 3/34 (11 overs)

Match drawn
City Oval, Pietermaritzburg
Umpires: Lubabalo Gcuma and Abongile Sodumo

- KwaZulu-Natal Inland won the toss and elected to field.

13–15 December 2018
Scorecard

Gauteng (South Africa)	v	(South Africa) Northern Cape
248 (71.5 overs); Joshua Richards 132 (205); Zakhele Qwabe 3/58 (16 overs)		248 (82 overs); Keegan Petersen 69 (142); Ayavuya Myoli 3/37 (15 overs)
331/5d (83 overs); Joshua Richards 118 (201); Jacques Snyman 3/61 (22 overs)		159 (45 overs); Jacques Snyman 51 (53); Delano Potgieter 3/24 (11 overs)

Gauteng won by 172 runs
Diamond Oval, Kimberley
Umpires: Thomas Mokorosi and Abdoellah Steenkamp

- Northern Cape won the toss and elected to field.

13–15 December 2018
Scorecard

Northerns (South Africa)	v	(South Africa) North West
471 (115.4 overs); Victor Mahlangu 169 (273); Johannes Diseko 3/78 (26.4 overs)		222 (64.3 overs); Richardt Frenz 49 (82); Itumaleng Moseki 4/21 (9 overs)
		221/3 (55 overs) (f/o); Nicky van den Bergh 66* (73); Neil Brand 1/29 (9 overs)

Match drawn
Senwes Park, Potchefstroom
Umpires: Johan Cloete and Gladman Gaseba

- Northerns won the toss and elected to bat.
- Itumaleng Moseki (Northerns) made his first-class debut.

=== January 2019 ===
10–12 January 2019
Scorecard

South Western Districts (South Africa)	v	(South Africa) North West
284 (65 overs); Marcello Piedt 86 (65); Brady Barends 6/59 (16 overs)		411/8d (110 overs); Richardt Frenz 168 (226); Marcello Piedt 5/54 (23 overs)
244 (69.4 overs); Jean du Plessis 67 (137); Johannes Diseko 5/85 (23.4 overs)		89 (24.5 overs); Shane Dadswell 19 (14); Niel Hornbuckle 5/34 (12 overs)

South Western Districts won by 28 runs
Senwes Park, Potchefstroom
Umpires: Gawie Botha and Lubabalo Gcuma

- North West won the toss and elected to field.
- Duan Jansen and Khanya Cotani (North West) both made their first-class debuts.

10–12 January 2019
Scorecard

Eastern Province (South Africa)	v	(South Africa) Northerns
224 (90.3 overs); Clyde Fortuin 88 (165); Itumaleng Moseki 3/28 (13.3 overs)		316 (105.4 overs); Andrea Agathangelou 110 (168); Onke Nyaku 2/28 (16 overs)
94/1 (31 overs); Matthew Breetzke 44* (96); Diego Rosier 1/34 (10 overs)

Match drawn
Centurion Park, Centurion
Umpires: Dennis Smith and Abongile Sodumo

- Northerns won the toss and elected to field.

10–12 January 2019
Scorecard

Easterns (South Africa)	v	(South Africa) Border
320 (90.2 overs); Matthew Arnold 94 (176); Phaphama Fojela 5/46 (21.2 overs)		315 (81.3 overs); Marco Marais 123 (137); Rowan Richards 4/47 (22 overs)
341/3d (72.4 overs); Wesley Marshall 201* (199); Bamanye Xenxe 2/96 (19 overs)		146/7 (50 overs); Bradley Williams 42 (73); Dyllan Matthews 3/48 (19 overs)

Match drawn
Buffalo Park, East London
Umpires: Brad White and Godwin Von Willingh

- Border won the toss and elected to field.

10–12 January 2019
Scorecard

Northern Cape (South Africa)	v	(South Africa) Free State
232 (66.5 overs); Mtabozuko Nqam 42 (63); Eddie Leie 4/58 (18.5 overs)		183 (52.5 overs); Beyers Swanepoel 62* (71); Mbulelo Budaza 3/33 (13 overs)
126 (38.2 overs); Farhaan Sayanvala 26 (34); Johan van Dyk 5/27 (14.2 overs)		176/2 (51.3 overs); Patrick Botha 65* (74); Kagiso Mohale 1/15 (4 overs)

Free State won by 8 wickets
Diamond Oval, Kimberley
Umpires: Jan Erasmus and Stephen Harris

- Free State won the toss and elected to field.

17–19 January 2019
Scorecard

North West (South Africa)	v	(South Africa) Free State
122 (50.3 overs); Craig Alexander 51 (57); Romano Terblanche 3/5 (6.3 overs)		220 (75.1 overs); Karabo Mogotsi 74 (142); Marco Jansen 4/39 (21 overs)
289 (96.3 overs); Ruan Haasbroek 90* (131); Johan van Dyk 5/88 (25 overs)		91 (32 overs); Beyers Swanepoel 16 (11); Duan Jansen 6/9 (6 overs)

North West won by 100 runs
Mangaung Oval, Bloemfontein
Umpires: Ryan Hendricks and Neville Game

- Free State won the toss and elected to field.

17–19 January 2019
Scorecard

Western Province (South Africa)	v	(South Africa) KwaZulu-Natal
205 (64.5 overs); Isaac Dikgale 56 (112); Yves Kamanzi 4/36 (11 overs)		250 (78.4 overs); Michael Erlank 46 (65); Justin Dill 4/65 (19.1 overs)
120 (49.5 overs); Mpilo Njoloza 31 (33); Daryn Dupavillon 7/24 (18 overs)		79/0 (8.5 overs); Michael Erlank 40* (26)

KwaZulu-Natal won by 10 wickets
Chatsworth Stadium, Durban
Umpires: Rudi Birkenstock and Sinethemba Mjekula

- Western Province won the toss and elected to bat.
- Matthew Montgomery, Yves Kamanzi (KwaZulu-Natal), Jonathan Bird and Luke Philander (Western Province) all made their first-class debuts.

24–26 January 2019
Scorecard

Boland (South Africa)	v	(South Africa) Easterns
460/8d (128.5 overs); Hanno Kotze 222 (253); Dyllan Matthews 5/138 (31.5 overs)		309 (109.5 overs); Grant Thomson 58 (108); Lizaad Williams 4/60 (23 overs)
		166/2 (39 overs) (f/o); Wesley Coulentianos 66* (73); Nkululeko Serame 1/49 (14 overs)

Match drawn
Boland Park, Paarl
Umpires: Arno Jacobs and Dawood Arkeldien

- Boland won the toss and elected to bat.

31 January–2 February 2019
Scorecard

Border (South Africa)	v	(South Africa) Northern Cape
250/6d (82.5 overs); Somila Seyibokwe 59 (77); Zakhele Qwabe 3/38 (21 overs)		55/2d (16.5 overs); Luthando Mnyanda 30 (50); Bradley Mauer 1/13 (8 overs)

Match drawn
Buffalo Park, East London
Umpires: Abongile Sodumo and Murray Brown

- Northern Cape won the toss and elected to field.
- Only 37 overs were bowled on day 1 and no play was possible on day 2 due to rain.
- Joshua Dodd and Bradley Mauer (Border) both made their first-class debuts.

=== February 2019 ===
7–9 February 2019
Scorecard

Northern Cape (South Africa)	v	(South Africa) North West
205 (59.4 overs); Aubrey Swanepoel 56 (84); Marco Jansen 5/67 (19.4 overs)		412/6d (118.1 overs); Lesego Senokwane 103 (222); Aubrey Swanepoel 2/61 (21 overs)
267/8 (86.3 overs); Luthando Mnyanda 112* (248); Marco Jansen 3/69 (20.1 overs)

Match drawn
Diamond Oval, Kimberley
Umpires: Ryan Hendricks and Jurie Sadler

- North West won the toss and elected to field.

7–9 February 2019
Scorecard

Western Province (South Africa)	v	(South Africa) Gauteng
162 (52.1 overs); Renaldo Meyer 36 (39); Sean Jamison 4/52 (16 overs)		221 (71.1 overs); Dominic Hendricks 79 (160); Junaid Dawood 3/19 (6 overs)
220 (93.5 overs); Andre Malan 59 (168); Sean Jamison 5/47 (22.5 overs)		165/4 (35.2 overs); Dominic Hendricks 59 (81); Luke Philander 1/13 (4 overs)

Gauteng won by 6 wickets
New Wanderers Stadium, Johannesburg
Umpires: Rudi Birkenstock and Marlon Jansen

- Gauteng won the toss and elected to field.
- Cameron Shekleton (Gauteng) made his first-class debut.

7–9 February 2019
Scorecard

Northerns (South Africa)	v	(South Africa) Easterns
165 (47.1 overs); Rivaldo Moonsamy 55 (57); Ryan Cartwright 4/48 (14 overs)		399 (113.5 overs); Wesley Coulentianos 172 (286); Ruben Trumpelmann 3/105 (24 overs)
237 (68.2 overs); Neil Brand 92 (145); Jurie Snyman 2/18 (6 overs)		5/0 (3.2 overs); Wesley Marshall 1* (7)

Easterns won by 10 wickets
Willowmoore Park, Benoni
Umpires: Arno Jacobs and Abdoellah Steenkamp

- Easterns won the toss and elected to field.

7–9 February 2019
Scorecard

Eastern Province (South Africa)	v	(South Africa) Boland
254 (74.3 overs); Edward Moore 66 (83); Kyle Simmonds 7/87 (27.3 overs)		150 (37.4 overs); Kyle Simmonds 45 (60); Glenton Stuurman 5/32 (11 overs)
265/9d (75 overs); Solo Nqweni 58 (121); Kyle Simmonds 3/73 (30.2 overs)		164 (52.3 overs); Hanno Kotze 45 (48); Tian Koekemoer 3/38 (9.3 overs)

Eastern Province won by 205 runs
St George's Park, Port Elizabeth
Umpires: Clifford Isaacs and Dawood Arkeldien

- Boland won the toss and elected to field.

7–9 February 2019
Scorecard

KwaZulu-Natal (South Africa)	v	(South Africa) South Western Districts
143 (54.3 overs); Matthew Montgomey 37 (84); Obus Pienaar 5/56 (17.3 overs)		270 (77.4 overs); Niel Hornbuckle 125* (164); Smangaliso Nhlebela 7/100 (30.4 overs)
398/7d (106 overs); Blayde Capell 166 (236); Obus Pienaar 4/112 (36 overs)		164 (62.2 overs); Obus Pienaar 122* (201); Daryn Dupavillon 3/14 (8.2 overs)

KwaZulu-Natal won by 107 runs
Recreation Ground, Oudtshoorn
Umpires: Thomas Mokorosi and Stephen Rex

- KwaZulu-Natal won the toss and elected to bat.

14–16 February 2019
Scorecard

Boland (South Africa)	v	(South Africa) Gauteng
329 (111.2 overs); Fritz de Beer 90 (159); Sean Jamison 5/68 (26 overs)		449 (121.2 overs); Stephen Cook 135 (213); Reeve Cyster 4/80 (28 overs)
256/8 (70 overs); Fritz de Beer 97 (125); Sean Jamison 4/44 (18 overs)

Match drawn
Boland Park, Paarl
Umpires: Jurie Sadler and Abdoellah Steenkamp

- Boland won the toss and elected to bat.
- Reeve Cyster (Boland) made his first-class debut.

14–16 February 2019
Scorecard

North West (South Africa)	v	(South Africa) Western Province
141 (59.5 overs); Richardt Frenz 46 (88); Michael Cohen 4/29 (12 overs)		288 (97.5 overs); Justin Dill 80* (114); Johannes Diseko 6/71 (32.5 overs)
202 (85.5 overs); Shane Dadswell 74 (171); Mpilo Njoloza 3/34 (19 overs)		56/3 (10.1 overs); Andre Malan 18* (17); Jon Hinrichsen 3/18 (5 overs)

Western Province won by 7 wickets
Newlands, Cape Town
Umpires: Thomas Mokorosi and Philip Vosloo

- Western Province won the toss and elected to field.
- Thando Ntini (Western Province) made his first-class debut.

14–16 February 2019
Scorecard

Northerns (South Africa)	v	(South Africa) Border
351 (94.1 overs); Ruan de Swardt 124 (174); Basheeru-Deen Walters 3/61 (21.1 overs)		190 (64.5 overs); Mncedisi Malika 54 (90); Ruan de Swardt 4/43 (21 overs)
47/0 (10.4 overs); Victor Mahlangu 26* (35)		206 (66.5 overs) (f/o); Jason Niemand 46 (76); Gionne Koopman 2/21 (9 overs)

Northerns won by 10 wickets
Buffalo Park, East London
Umpires: Hassen Dawood and Bongani Ntshebe

- Border won the toss and elected to field.

14–16 February 2019
Scorecard

Easterns (South Africa)	v	(South Africa) South Western Districts
130/3 (29.4 overs); Jurie Snyman 74* (85); Stefan Tait 2/40 (10 overs)

Match drawn
Willowmoore Park, Benoni
Umpires: Ryan Hendricks and Marlon Jansen

- South Western Districts won the toss and elected to field.
- No play was possible on days 1 and 3, and only 30 overs were bowled on day 2 due to rain and a wet outfield.
- Mesuli Vuba (South Western Districts) made his first-class debut.

21–23 February 2019
Scorecard

KwaZulu-Natal (South Africa)	v	(South Africa) Northerns
180 (69.2 overs); Sibonelo Makhanya 69 (120); Gionne Koopman 2/22 (7.2 overs)		217 (60.3 overs); Neil Brand 55 (106); Daryn Dupavillon 3/37 (17 overs)
264/2 (66 overs); Marques Ackerman 109* (92); Gionne Koopman 1/44 (11 overs)

Match drawn
Centurion Park, Centurion

- KwaZulu-Natal won the toss and elected to bat.
- Nikhil Prem (KwaZulu-Natal) made his first-class debut.

21–23 February 2019
Scorecard

Western Province (South Africa)	v	(South Africa) KwaZulu-Natal Inland
421/3d (114.5 overs); Jack Newby 159* (309); Lwandiswa Zuma 1/66 (14 overs)		194 (68.1 overs); Kurtlyn Mannikam 32 (39); Mpilo Njoloza 5/28 (18 overs)
		338/7 (99 overs) (f/o); Luke Schlemmer 143* (241); Thando Ntini 4/98 (20 overs)

Match drawn
Newlands, Cape Town

- Western Province won the toss and elected to bat.
- Mujaahid Toffar (Western Province) made his first-class debut.

21–23 February 2019
Scorecard

Eastern Province (South Africa)	v	(South Africa) Gauteng
436/8d (99.5 overs); Edward Moore 227* (298); Shaylen Pillay 2/62 (14.5 overs)		50 (19.2 overs); Muhammed Mayet 14 (34); Glenton Stuurman 5/16 (8 overs)
		276 (100 overs) (f/o); Mitchell Van Buuren 65 (157); Glenton Stuurman 5/48 (22 overs)

Eastern Province won by an innings and 110 runs
New Wanderers Stadium, Johannesburg

- Eastern Province won the toss and elected to bat.

28 February–2 March 2019
Scorecard

Eastern Province (South Africa)	v	(South Africa) South Western Districts
454/3d (120 overs); Joshua van Heerden 163 (275); Kirwin Christoffels 2/24 (9 overs)		328 (89.2 overs); Brendon Louw 87 (151); Thomas Kaber 5/72 (20.2 overs)
186/2d (31 overs); Edward Moore 89 (81); Niel Hornbuckle 2/43 (7 overs)

Recreation Ground, Oudtshoorn
Umpires: Abongile Sodumo and Abdoellah Steenkamp

- Eastern Province won the toss and elected to bat.

28 February–2 March 2019
Scorecard

Western Province (South Africa)	v	(South Africa) Boland
148 (61.5 overs); Jason Smith 47 (73); Ziyaad Abrahams 4/33 (17.5 overs)		214 (74.1 overs); Ferisco Adams 53 (64); Matthew Kleinveldt 3/23 (9 overs)
379/6d (91.4 overs); Qaasim Adams 100 (120); Nkululeko Serame 2/116 (29 overs)		161/3 (58 overs); Isma-eel Gafieldien 62* (157); Thando Ntini 1/15 (9 overs)

Match drawn
Boland Park, Paarl
Umpires: Ryan Hendricks and Bongani Ntshebe

- Western Province won the toss and elected to bat.

28 February–2 March 2019
Scorecard

Free State (South Africa)	v	(South Africa) Border
299 (84.3 overs); Romano Terblanche 92* (134); Basheeru-Deen Walters 3/47 (15.3 overs)		274 (105.1 overs); Jason Niemand 107 (217); Corné Dry 5/79 (26 overs)
177/5 (51 overs); Hanco Olivier 56 (109); Sithembile Langa 3/44 (13 overs)

Match drawn
University of Free State Ground, Bloemfontein
Umpires: Godwin Von Willingh and Jurie Sadler

- Free State won the toss and elected to bat.
- Marno van Greuning, Pheko Moletsane (Free State) and Kyle Jacobs (Border) all made their first-class debuts.

28 February–2 March 2019
Scorecard

Northern Cape (South Africa)	v	(South Africa) KwaZulu-Natal Inland
117 (33.5 overs); Desmond de Koker 31 (28); Lwandiswa Zuma 4/27 (7.5 overs)		160 (48.2 overs); Grant Roelofsen 68* (95); Jacques Snyman 5/67 (19 overs)
249 (69.3 overs); Jacques Snyman 70 (101); Ruhan Pretorius 2/34 (11 overs)		210/8 (69.4 overs); Grant Roelofsen 44 (74); Aubrey Swanepoel 2/22 (13 overs)

KwaZulu-Natal Inland won by 2 wickets
Diamond Oval, Kimberley
Umpires: Marlon Jansen and Mazizi Gampu

- Northern Cape won the toss and elected to bat.
- Garnett Tarr (Northern Cape) made his first-class debut.

=== March 2019 ===
7–9 March 2019
Scorecard

Boland (South Africa)	v	(South Africa) North West
348 (88.2 overs); Dayyaan Galiem 108* (181); Jon Hinrichsen 4/80 (21 overs)		140 (44.4 overs); Shane Dadswell 48 (81); Nkululeko Serame 2/9 (4.4 overs)
		139 (46.5 overs) (f/o); Shane Dadswell 37 (49); Kyle Simmonds 4/36 (12.5 overs)

Boland won by an innings and 69 runs
Senwes Park, Potchefstroom
Umpires: Clifford Isaacs and Abdoellah Steenkamp

- Boland won the toss and elected to bat.

14–16 March 2019
Scorecard

KwaZulu-Natal Inland (South Africa)	v	(South Africa) Easterns
186 (53.1 overs); Grant Roelofsen 58 (103); Lance Humphrey 4/44 (12 overs)		252 (96 overs); Wesley Coulentianos 62 (166); Ruhan Pretorius 5/73 (24 overs)
277 (96.2 overs); Gareth Dukes 40 (96); Sinenhlanhla Zwane 3/35 (11.2 overs)		120/2 (25 overs); Wesley Marshall 66* (72); Kurtlyn Mannikam 1/33 (4 overs)

Match drawn
City Oval, Pietermaritzburg
Umpires: Kevin Lawrence and Clifford Isaacs

- Easterns won the toss and elected to field.
- Xolani Mahlaba (KwaZulu-Natal Inland) and Sinenhlanhla Zwane (Easterns) both made their first-class debuts.

14–16 March 2019
Scorecard

Border (South Africa)	v	(South Africa) Gauteng
232 (85.1 overs); Mkhululi Calana 71 (194); Sean Jamison 3/47 (17.1 overs)		211 (62.2 overs); Muhammed Mayet 101 (146); Joshua Dodd 4/57 (18 overs)
238 (69.4 overs); Mncedisi Malika 48 (52); Wiaan Mulder 3/51 (18 overs)		244/9 (68 overs); Muhammed Mayet 76* (130); Joshua Dodd 7/67 (18 overs)

Match drawn
New Wanderers Stadium, Johannesburg
Umpires: Philip Vosloo and Stephen Rex

- Gauteng won the toss and elected to field.

14–16 March 2019
Scorecard

Northerns (South Africa)	v	(South Africa) Western Province
432 (118 overs); Leus du Plooy 119 (251); Mujaahid Toffar 2/12 (3 overs)		417/7 (130 overs); Matthew Kleinveldt 142 (233); Leus du Plooy 3/76 (23 overs)

Match drawn
Centurion Park, Centurion
Umpires: Hassen Dawood and Abdoellah Steenkamp

- Northerns won the toss and elected to bat.
- Mihlali Mpongwana (Western Province) made his first-class debut.

21–23 March 2019
Scorecard

Northern Cape (South Africa)	v	(South Africa) KwaZulu-Natal
235/9d (64.3 overs); Kagiso Mohale 105* (120); Keith Dudgeon 5/55 (20 overs)		208/5 (65 overs); Michael Erlank 59 (146); Aidan Brooker 1/17 (7 overs)

Match drawn
Chatsworth Stadium, Durban
Umpires: Thomas Mokorosi and Bongani Ntshebe

- KwaZulu-Natal won the toss and elected to field.
- Andile Mokgakane (KwaZulu-Natal) made his first-class debut.

21–23 March 2019
Scorecard

KwaZulu-Natal Inland (South Africa)	v	(South Africa) Boland

Match abandoned
City Oval, Pietermaritzburg
Umpires: Godwin Von Willingh and Philip Vosloo

- No toss.
- No play was possible due to rain.

21–23 March 2019
Scorecard

Free State (South Africa)	v	(South Africa) Eastern Province
326 (79.4 overs); Patrick Botha 122 (177); Luvuyo Adam 4/62 (17.4 overs)		102 (41.2 overs); Tian Koekemoer 47 (84); Thandolwethu Mnyaka 4/16 (9 overs)
		303/6 (146 overs) (f/o); Mathew Christensen 83 (268); Patrick Botha 2/22 (27 overs)

Match drawn
University of Free State Ground, Bloemfontein
Umpires: Rudi Birkenstock and Murray Brown

- Free State won the toss and elected to bat.
- David Masterson, Keenan Vieira and Tiaan van Vuuren (Eastern Province) all made their first-class debuts.

28–30 March 2019
Scorecard

Free State (South Africa)	v	(South Africa) Boland
329 (92.1 overs); Paballo Mogoera 68 (94); Kyle Simmonds 4/128 (32 overs)		375 (101 overs); Dayyaan Galiem 78* (119); Tshepo Ntuli 4/122 (37 overs)
179 (70.5 overs); Romano Terblanche 65* (92); Kyle Simmonds 4/67 (21 overs)		134/4 (37.1 overs); Fritz de Beer 55 (71); Hanco Olivier 3/16 (5 overs)

Boland won by 6 wickets
Boland Park, Paarl
Umpires: Johan Cloete and Marlon Jansen

- Boland won the toss and elected to field.
- Ruan Terblanche (Boland) made his first-class debut.

28–30 March 2019
Scorecard

Eastern Province (South Africa)	v	(South Africa) Easterns
404 (118.3 overs); Joshua van Heerden 92 (133); Dyllan Matthews 3/86 (23 overs)		172 (51.4 overs); Wesley Coulentianos 42 (87); Luvuyo Adam 5/38 (16.4 overs)
157 (54.1 overs); Joshua van Heerden 44 (101); Dyllan Matthews 3/19 (10 overs)		184/6 (68 overs); Wesley Marshall 48 (98); Luvuyo Adam 3/38 (24 overs)

Match drawn
St George's Park, Port Elizabeth
Umpires: Murray Brown and Stephen Rex

- Eastern Province won the toss and elected to bat.

28–30 March 2019
Scorecard

KwaZulu-Natal (South Africa)	v	(South Africa) Gauteng
218 (55.3 overs); Tyron Koen 63 (83); Aristides Karvelas 5/49 (15 overs)		194 (66.4 overs); Omphile Ramela 41 (107); Keith Dudgeon 5/58 (24 overs)
81 (32.4 overs); Matthew Montgomery 27 (74); Sean Jamison 5/16 (10.4 overs)		109/8 (36.1 overs); Stephen Cook 62* (98); Keith Dudgeon 7/43 (18.1 overs)

Gauteng won by 2 wickets
New Wanderers Stadium, Johannesburg
Umpires: Siphelele Gasa and Ryan Hendricks

- Gauteng won the toss and elected to field.
- Khwezi Gumede (KwaZulu-Natal) made his first-class debut.

28–30 March 2019
Scorecard

Border (South Africa)	v	(South Africa) Western Province
106 (31.4 overs); Phaphama Fojela 29* (24); Jason Smith 5/26 (9 overs)		267 (80.2 overs); Matthew Kleinveldt 83 (137); Phaphama Fojela 4/59 (24)
141 (47 overs); Mncedisi Malika 55 (76); Jason Smith 5/27 (12 overs)

Western Province won by an innings and 20 runs
Newlands, Cape Town
Umpires: Lubabalo Gcuma and Jurie Sadler

- Border won the toss and elected to bat.

== Final ==
11–14 April 2019
Scorecard

Eastern Province (South Africa)	v	(South Africa) Northerns
477 (129.4 overs); Tian Koekemoer 130 (275); Alfred Mothoa 7/115 (31.4 overs)		272 (108.4 overs); Leus du Plooy 119 (275); Siviwe Gidana 3/39 (15 overs)
85/5d (15.3 overs); Edward Moore 32 (31); Kulani Baloyi 2/28 (6.3 overs)		147/2 (34 overs); Jonathan Vandiar 61* (47); Siviwe Gidana 1/9 (5 overs)

Match drawn
St George's Park, Port Elizabeth
Umpires: Marlon Jansen and Jurie Sadler

- Eastern Province won the toss and elected to bat.
- Kulani Baloyi (Northerns) made his first-class debut.
