= 2024–25 CSA T20 Challenge =

Cricket tournament

- Dates: 27 September – 27 October 2024
- Administrator: Cricket South Africa
- Cricket format: Twenty20
- Tournament format(s): Round-robin and knockout
- Host: South Africa
- Champions: Lions (6th title)
- Runners-up: Titans
- Participants: 8
- Matches: 32
- Most runs: Edward Moore (328)
- Most wickets: Junaid Dawood (13)

The 2024–25 CSA T20 Challenge was a Twenty20 cricket tournament that took place in South Africa. It was the 21st season of the CSA T20 Challenge, organized by Cricket South Africa. The tournament started on 27 September and the final was played on 27 October 2024. Lions are the defending champions.

== Teams and squads ==
Gbets Rocks Boland	Hollywoodbets Dolphins	DP World Lions	Knights	North West Dragons	Momentum Multiply Titans	Dafabet Warriors	Western Province
Head Coaches
Justin Ontong	Quinton Friend	Russell Domingo	JP Triegaardt	Craig Alexander	Mandla Mashimbyi	Robin Peterson	Salieg Nackerdien
Captains
Clyde Fortuin	Prenelan Subrayen	Mitchell Van Buuren	Dane Piedt	Wihan Lubbe	Neil Brand	Matthew Breetzke	Beuran Hendricks
Players
Pieter Malan; Grant Roelofsen; Gavin Kaplan; Keith Dudgeon; Siyabonga Mahima; Ferisco Adams; Shaun von Berg; Imraan Manack; Michael Copeland; Aviwe Mgijima; Akhona Mnyaka; Blayde Capell; Ethan Cunningham; Ayabulela Gqamane; Jevano Baron; Nathan Jacobs; Lehan Botha	Marques Ackerman; Jon-Jon Smuts; Bryce Parsons; Eathan Bosch; Romashan Pillay; Khaya Zondo; Bradley Porteous, Slade van Staden; Okuhle Cele; Andile Simelane; Jason Smith; Ottneil Baartman; Hanu Viljoen; Daryn Dupavillon; Tshepang Dithole; Banele Cele; Nqobani Mokoena; David Miller; Keshav Maharaj	Bjorn Fortuin; Codi Yusuf; Delano Potgieter; Evan Jones; Joshua Richards; Junaid Dawood; Khaya Fakude; Kwena Maphaka; Lutho Sipamla; Muhammad Manack; Rafeeq Patel; Rassie van der Dussen; Reeza Hendricks; Richard Seletswane; Tshepo Moreki; Wandile Makwetu; Zack Momberg; Zubayr Hamza; Connor Esterhuizen	Patrick Botha; Isaac Dikgale; Lesego Senokwane: Jacques Snyman; Gihahn Cloete; Matthew Pollard; Tiaan van Vuuren; Nipho Mpungose; Dian Forrester; Sithembile Langa; Johan van Dyk; Aaron Phangiso; Clayton Bosch; Aubrey Swanepoel; Garnett Tarr; Ruan Cronje; Monde Maqunqu; Malusi Siboto; Seth Flerdermaus	Rubi Hermann; Taheer Isaacs; Thamsanqa Khumalo; Matthew Kleinveldt; Lesiba Ngoepe; Ludwich Schuld; Ruan de Swardt; Caleb Seleka; Lutendo Tsanwani; Bamanye Xenxe; Meeka-eel Prince; Odirile Modimokoane; Raynard van Tonder; Mohammed Bulbulia; Gideon Peters; Achille Cloete; Janneman Malan; Marco Jansen; Duan Jansen; Migael Pretorius; Kerwin Mungroo	Junior Dala; Keegan Petersen; Donovan Ferreira; Joshua van Heerden; Rivaldo Moonsamy; Tshepo Ndwandwa; Dewald Brevis; Lhuan-dre Pretorius; Corbin Bosch; Dayyaan Galiem; Lizaad Williams; Sibonelo Makhanya; Matthew Boast; Roelof van der Merwe; Jhedli van Briesies; Merrick Brett; Schalk Engelbrecht; Steve Stolk; Aiden Markram; Gerald Coetzee; Heinrich Klaasen; Lungi Ngidi; Andile Phehlukwayo; Tabraiz Shamsi	Alfred Mothoa; Anrich Nortje; Beyers Swanepoel; Sinethemba Qeshile; Patrick Kruger; Liam Alder; Tristan Stubbs; Diego Rosier; Jordan Hermann; Siya Plaatjie; Renaldo Meyer; Jiveshan Pillay; JP King; Andile Mokgakane; Siya Simetu; Nealan van Heerden; Matthew de Villiers; Duanne Olivier; Jean du Plessis; Senuran Muthusamy; CJ King; Eathan Frosler; Jason Raubenheimer	Edward Moore; Daniel Smith; George Linde; Kyle Simmonds; Nandre Burger; Tony de Zorzi; Jonathan Bird; Kyle Verreynne; Onke Nyaku; Valentine Kitime; Liyema Waqu; Mthiwekhaya Nabe; David Bedingham; Juan James; Mihlali Mpongwana; Dane Paterson; Abdallah Bayoumy; Yaseen Vallie; Wesley Bedja
Source Club Cricket.Co.Za

== Venues ==
Cape Town	Centurion	Durban	Pietermaritzburg
Newlands Cricket Ground	Centurion Park	Kingsmead Cricket Ground	City Oval
Capacity: 25,000	Capacity: 22,000	Capacity: 25,000	Capacity: 12,000
2024–25 CSA T20 Challenge (South Africa)
Gqeberha	Johannesburg	Paarl	Cape Town
St George's Park Cricket Ground	Wanderers Stadium	Boland Park	Cape Town Stadium
Capacity: 19,000	Capacity: 34,000	Capacity: 10,000	Capacity: 57,000

== Standing ==
Pos	Team	Pld	W	L	NR	BP	Pts	NRR	Qualification
1	Lions	7	5	2	0	2	22	0.014	Advance to Qualifier 1
2	Titans	7	4	2	1	3	21	2.037	Advance to Qualifier 1
3	North West	7	4	2	1	1	19	0.355	Advance to Eliminator
4	Western Province	7	3	3	1	1	15	0.033	Advance to Eliminator
5	Boland	7	3	3	1	0	14	−0.966	
6	Warriors	7	3	4	0	0	12	−0.324	
7	Knights	7	2	5	0	0	8	−0.144	
8	Dolphins	7	2	5	0	0	8	−0.714	

Source: ESPNcricinfo

== Fixtures ==
On 30 July 2024, Cricket South Africa confirmed the full schedule for the tournament.

27 September 2024
18:00 (D/N)
Scorecard

Titans; 258/6 (20 overs)	v	Lions; 141/8 (20 overs)
Lhuan-dre Pretorius 82 (43); Kwena Maphaka 2/31 (4 overs)		Evan Jones 83 (48); Dayyaan Galiem 3/22 (4 overs)

Titans won by 177 runs
Wanderers Stadium, Johannesburg
Umpires: Siphelele Gasa and Bongani Jele
Player of the match: Roelof van der Merwe (Titans)
Lhuan-dre Pretorius (Titans)

- Lions won the toss and elected to field.
- Points: Titans 5, Lions 0

28 September 2024
14:00
Scorecard

North West; 144/4 (18 overs)	v	Knights; 146/6 (18 overs)
Wihan Lubbe 58 (40); Dian Forrester 2/22 (4 overs)		Dian Forrester 46* (37); Duan Jansen 3/30 (4 overs)

North West won by 3 runs (DLS method)
Mangaung Oval, Bloemfontein
Umpires: Mazizi Gampu and Abdoellah Steenkamp

- North West won the toss and elected to bat.
- The match was reduced to 18 overs per side due to rain and wet outfield.
- Knights were set a revised target of 150 runs form 18 overs due to rain.
- Points: North West 4, Knights 0

29 September 2024
14:00
Scorecard

Western Province	v	Boland

Match abandoned
Newlands, Cape Town
Umpires: Lubabalo Gcuma and Dennis Smith

- No play was possible due to rain.
- Points: Western Province 2, Boland 2

29 September 2024
14:00
Scorecard

Dolphins; 162/9 (20 overs)	v	Warriors; 163/4 (19.2 overs)
Eathan Bosch 45 (19); Christopher King 3/18 (4 overs)		Jean du Plessis 69* (45); Eathan Bosch 1/21 (3.2 overs)

Warriors won by 6 wickets
St George's Park, Gqeberha
Umpires: Philip Vosloo and Brad White

- Warriors won the toss and elected to field.
- Nqobani Mokoena, Romashan Pillay, Slade van Staden (Dolphins) Josh King and Siya Plaatjie (Warriors) all made their T20 debuts.
- Points: Warriors 4, Dolphins 0

4 October 2024
18:00 (D/N)
Scorecard

Boland; 141 (19.5 overs)	v	Knights; 141/4 (20 overs)
Grant Roelofsen 51 (38); Dian Forrester 3/30 (2.5 overs)		Dian Forrester 42* (28); Keith Dudgeon 2/23 (4 overs)

Match tied (Boland won the Super Over)
Boland Park, Paarl
Umpires: Marais Erasmus and Abdoellah Steenkamp

- Knights won the toss and elected to field.
- Dian Forrester (Knights) took his first hat-trick in T20 cricket.
- Super Over: Knights 1/2, Boland 2/1
- Points: Boland 4, Knights 0

4 October 2024
18:00 (D/N)
Scorecard

Titans; 210/3 (20 overs)	v	Dolphins; 159/9 (20 overs)
Rivaldo Moonsamy 81* (47); Andile Simelane 2/46 (4 overs)		Marques Ackerman 42 (32); Roelof van der Merwe 4/31 (4 overs)

Titans won by 51 runs
Kingsmead, Durban
Umpires: Lubabalo Gcuma and Thomas Mokorosi

- Dolphins won the toss and elected to field.
- Points: Titans 5, Dolphins 0

4 October 2024
18:00 (D/N)
Scorecard

Lions; 239/4 (20 overs)	v	Warriors; 177/6 (20 overs)
Wandile Makwetu 55 (41); Beyers Swanepoel 1/26 (4 overs)		Andile Mokgakane 41 (47); Junaid Dawood 5/30 (4 overs)

Lions won by 62 runs
Wanderers Stadium, Johannesburg
Umpires: Siphelele Gasa and Kerrin Klaaste

- Lions won the toss and elected to bat.
- Junaid Dawood (Lions) took his first five-wicket haul in T20s.
- Points: Lions 5, Warriors 0

4 October 2024
18:00 (D/N)
Scorecard

Western Province; 142/9 (20 overs)	v	North West; 146/7 (19.4 overs)
Edward Moore 38 (31); Marco Jansen 3/34 (4 overs)		Wihan Lubbe 55 (37); George Linde 2/24 (4 overs)

North West won by 3 wickets
JB Marks Oval, Potchefstroom
Umpires: Allahudien Paleker and Warren Wyngaard

- North West won the toss and elected to field.
- Points: North West 4, Western Province 0

6 October 2024
14:00
Scorecard

Knights; 166/9 (20 overs)	v	Warriors; 150/6 (20 overs)
Garnett Tarr 50 (28); Siya Simetu 2/18 (4 overs)		Matthew Breetzke 66 (46); Malusi Siboto 4/28 (4 overs)

Knights won by 16 runs
St George's Park, Gqeberha
Umpires: Bongani Jele and Abongile Sodumo
Player of the match: Garnett Tarr (Knights)
Malusi Siboto (Knights)

- Knights won the toss and elected to bat.
- Points: Knights 4, Warriors 0

6 October 2024
14:00
Scorecard

Lions; 156/5 (20 overs)	v	Dolphins; 147/8 (20 overs)
Joshua Richards 38 (32); Andile Simelane 2/36 (4 overs)		Marques Ackerman 32 (19); Junaid Dawood 3/22 (4 overs)

Lions won by 9 runs
Wanderers Stadium, Johannesburg
Umpires: Brad White and Andre Olivier
Player of the match: Junaid Dawood (Lions)
Evan Jones (Lions)

- Lions won the toss and elected to bat.
- Points:Lions 4, Dolphins 0

6 October 2024
14:00
Scorecard

Titans; 143/8 (20 overs)	v	Western Province; 144/3 (15.4 overs)
Donovan Ferreira 35 (27); Wesley Bedja 2/22 (4 overs)		Edward Moore 88* (47); Corbin Bosch 2/23 (3 overs)

Western Province won by 7 wickets
Centurion Park, Centurion
Umpires: Abdoellah Steenkamp and Philip Vosloo
Player of the match: George Linde (Western Province)
Edward Moore (Western Province)

- Western Province won the toss and elected to field.
- Points: Western Province 5, Titans 0

6 October 2024
14:00
Scorecard

North West; 176/5 (20 overs)	v	Boland; 173/7 (20 overs)
Meeka-eel Prince 83* (55); Glenton Stuurman 2/32 (4 overs)		Grant Roelofsen 63 (43); Lesiba Ngoepe 2/15 (2 overs)

North West won by 3 runs
JB Marks Oval, Potchefstroom
Umpires: Mazizi Gampu and Allahudien Paleker
Player of the match: Achille Cloete (North West)
Meeka-eel Prince (North West)

- Boland won the toss and elected to field.
- Points: North West 4, Boland 0

9 October 2024
18:00 (D/N)
Scorecard

Western Province; 148/7 (20 overs)	v	Warriors; 150/5 (17.4 overs)
George Linde 66* (31); Christopher King 3/27 (4 overs)		Beyers Swanepoel 83 (39); Mihlali Mpongwana 2/23 (3 overs)

Warriors won by 5 wickets
Newlands, Cape Town
Umpires: Arno Jacobs and Thomas Mokorosi
Player of the match: Beyers Swanepoel (Warriors)

- Western Province won the toss and elected to bat.
- Points: Warriors 4, Western Province 0

9 October 2024
18:00 (D/N)
Scorecard

North West; 136/7 (20 overs)	v	Dolphins; 93 (16.5 overs)
Wihan Lubbe 49 (29); Andile Simelane 4/19 (4 overs)		Jason Smith 26 (33); Bamanye Xenxe 4/25 (4 overs)

North West won by 43 runs
Newlands, Cape Town
Umpires: Dennis Smith and Warren Wyngaard
Player of the match: Bamanye Xenxe (North West)

- Dolphins won the toss and elected to field.
- Points: North West 5, Dolphins 0

9 October 2024
18:00 (D/N)
Scorecard

Lions; 142/7 (20 overs)	v	Knights; 95 (17.5 overs)
Wandile Makwetu 40 (34); Aaron Phangiso 3/26 (4 overs)		Aaron Phangiso 24 (21); Codi Yusuf 2/13 (3 overs)

Lions won by 47 runs
Mangaung Oval, Bloemfontein
Umpires: Mazizi Gampu and Allahudien Paleker
Player of the match: Wandile Makwetu (Lions)
Codi Yusuf (Lions)

- Lions won the toss and elected to bat.
- Points: Lions 5, Knights 0

9 October 2024
18:00 (D/N)
Scorecard

Titans; 169/4 (15 overs)	v	Boland; 75 (13.2 overs)
Heinrich Klaasen 71* (32); Ferisco Adams 2/2 (1.1 overs)		Ayabulela Gqamane 26 (18); Dayyaan Galiem 3/7 (3 overs)

Titans won by 94 runs
Centurion Park, Centurion
Umpires: Lubabalo Gcuma and Abongile Sodumo
Player of the match: Heinrich Klaasen (Titans)
Dayyaan Galiem (Titans)

- Bolands won the toss and elected to field.
- The match was reduced to 15 overs per side due to rain.
- Points: Titans 5, Boland 0

12 October 2024
14:00
Scorecard

Boland; 129/7 (20 overs)	v	Lions; 132/4 (19.4 overs)
Gavin Kaplan 53* (41); Junaid Dawood 3/21 (4 overs)		Reeza Hendricks 72* (50); Keith Dudgeon 2/18 (4 overs)

Lions won by 6 wickets
Boland Park, Paarl
Umpires: Stephen Harris and Thomas Mokorosi
Player of the match: Reeza Hendricks (Lions)
Junaid Dawood (Lions)

- Boland won the toss and elected to bat.
- Lehan Botha (Western Province) made his T20 debut.
- Points: Lions 4, Boland 0

12 October 2024
18:00 (D/N)
Scorecard

Warriors; 221/5 (20 overs)	v	North West; 200/3 (20 overs)
JP King 61 (33); Migael Pretorius 2/32 (4 overs)		Janneman Malan 111* (60); JP King 1/30 (4 overs)

Warriors won by 21 runs
St George's Park, Gqeberha
Umpires: Andre Olivier and Abdoellah Steenkamp
Player of the match: Janneman Malan (North West)
JP King (Warriors)

- Warriors won the toss and elected to bat.
- Ludwich Schuld (North West) made his T20 debut.
- Points: Warriors 4, North West 0

13 October 2024
14:00
Scorecard

Western Province; 167/6	v	Dolphins; 169/6 (19 overs)
Jonathan Bird 53 (38); Andile Simelane 3/44 (4 overs)		Marques Ackerman 74 (47); Mihlali Mpongwana 3/26 (3 overs)

Dolphins won by 4 wickets
Kingsmead, Durban
Umpires: Mazizi Gampu and Dennis Smith
Player of the match: Marques Ackerman (Dolphins)
Okuhle Cele (Dolphins)

- Dolphins won the toss and elected to field.
- Points: Dolphins 4, Western Province 0

13 October 2024
14:00
Scorecard

Knights; 223/6 (20 overs)	v	Titans; 191/6 (20 overs)
Rilee Rossouw 66 (32); Gerald Coetzee 2/37 (4 overs)		Donovan Ferreira 48 (28); Aaron Phangiso 2/22 (4 overs)

Knights won by 32 runs
Centurion Park, Centurion
Umpires: Siphelele Gasa and Allahudien Paleker
Player of the match: Rilee Rossouw (Knights)
Aaron Phangiso (Knights)

- Titans won the toss and elected to field.
- Letsholo Selemela (Titans) made his T20 debut.
- Points: Knights 4, Titans 0

15 October 2024
18:00 (D/N)
Scorecard

Titans	v	North West

No result
Centurion Park, Centurion
Umpires: Arno Jacobs and Brad White

- Titans
- Points: Titans 2, North West 2

16 October 2024
18:00 (D/N)
Scorecard

Boland; 171/6 (20 overs)	v	Warriors; 160 (19.5 overs)
Clyde Fortuin 50 (35); Liam Alder 2/24 (4 overs)		Patrick Kruger 51 (28); Glenton Stuurman 5/33 (4 overs)

Boland won by 11 runs
Boland Park, Paarl
Umpires: Marais Erasmus and Andre Olivier
Player of the match: Glenton Stuurman (Boland)
Patrick Kruger (Warriors)

- Boland won the toss and elected to bat.
- Glenton Stuurman (Boland) took his first five-wicket haul in T20s.
- Points: Boland 4, Warriors 0

16 October 2024
18:00 (D/N)
Scorecard

Knights; 155/9 (20 overs)	v	Dolphins; 158/4 (18.3 overs)
Jacques Snyman 58 (37); Jason Smith 3/21 (4 overs)		Jason Smith 65* (44); Sithembile Langa 2/34 (3.3 overs)

Dolphins won by 6 wickets
Mangaung Oval, Bloemfontein
Umpires: Mazizi Gampu and Warren Wyngaard

- Dolphins won the toss and elected to field.
- Points: Dolphins 4, Knights 0

16 October 2024
18:00 (D/N)
Scorecard

Lions; 145/7 (20 overs)	v	Western Province; 146/6 (19.3 overs)
Rassie van der Dussen 43 (33); Mthiwekhaya Nabe 2/24 (3 overs)		Edward Moore; Delano Potgieter 2/4 (3 overs)

Western Province won by 4 wickets
Wanderers Stadium, Johannesburg
Umpires: Arno Jacobs and Philip Vosloo
Player of the match: Edward Moore (Western Province)
Delano Potgieter (Lions)

- Lions won the toss and elected to bat.
- Points: Western Province 4, Lions 0

18 October 2024
18:00 (D/N)
Scorecard

Knights; 157/7 (20 overs)	v	Western Province; 163/4 (18.5 overs)
Dian Forrester 39 (26); Beuran Hendricks 2/28 (4 overs)		Daniel Smith 57 (33); Seth Fledermaus 2/32 (3 overs)

Newlands, Cape Town
Umpires: Marais Erasmus and Thomas Mokorosi
Player of the match: Kyle Simmonds (Western Province)
Daniel Smith (Western Province)

- Western Province won the toss and elected to field.
- Seth Fledermaus (Knights) made his T20 debut.
- Points: Western Province 4, Knights 0

19 October 2024
18:00 (D/N)
Scorecard

Warriors; 179/6 (20 overs)	v	Titans; 174/4 (16.2 overs)
Jordan Hermann 101 (60); Tabraiz Shamsi 2/23 (4 overs)		Rivaldo Moonsamy 73 (39); Anrich Nortje 1/46 (4 overs)

Titans won by 6 wickets (DLS method)
St George's Park, Gqeberha
Umpires: Arno Jacobs and Abongile Sodumo
Player of the match: Tabraiz Shamsi (Titans)
Jordan Hermann (Warriors)

- Titans won the toss and elected to field.
- Titans were set a revised target of 174 runs from 19 overs due to rain.
- Points: Titans 4, Warriors 0

19 October 2024
18:00 (D/N)
Scorecard

Boland; 167/4 (20 overs)	v	Dolphins; 83/5 (10 overs)
Shaun von Berg 50 (31); Prenelan Subrayen 1/13 (2 overs)		Bryce Parsons 34 (16); Imran Manack 2/11 (2 overs)

Boland won by 4 runs (DLS method)
Kingsmead, Durban
Umpires: Philip Vosloo and Warren Wyngaard
Player of the match: Shaun von Berg (Boland)
Imran Manack (Boland)

- Dolphins won the toss and elected to field.
- Dolphins were set a revised target of 88 runs from 10 overs.
- Points: Boland 4, Dolphins 0

19 October 2024
18:00 (D/N)
Scorecard

Lions; 170/3 (20 overs)	v	North West; 165/6 (20 overs)
Connor Esterhuizen 62* (39); Migael Pretorius 1/28 (4 overs)		Ludwich Schuld 60 (51); Kwena Maphaka 2/28 (4 overs)

Lions won by 5 runs
JB Marks Oval, Potchefstroom
Umpires: Mazizi Gampu and Bongani Jele
Player of the match: Connor Esterhuizen (Lions)
Kwena Maphaka (Lions)

- Lions won the toss and elected to bat.
- Points: Lions 4, North West 0

== Playoffs ==
Qualifier 1 / Eliminator
22 October 2024
1	Lions	116/3 (20)
2	Titans	115 (19.2)
23 October 2024
3	North West	125 (15.3)
4	Western Province	166/5 (20)

Qualifier 2
25 October 2024
Q1L	Titans	182/7 (20)
EW	Western Province	163/6 (20)

Final
27 October 2024
Q1W	Lions	124/2 (15.1)
Q2W	Titans	119 (19.2)

=== Qualifier 1 ===
22 October 2024
18:00 (D/N)
Scorecard

Titans; 115 (19.2 overs)	v	Lions; 116/3 (16 overs)
Dayyaan Galiem 44 (39); Nqaba Peter 4/15 (3.2 overs)		Reeza Hendricks 61 (43); Dayyaan Galiem 2/16 (4 overs)

Lions won by 7 wickets
Wanderers Stadium, Johannesburg
Umpires: Arno Jacobs and Allahudien Paleker
Player of the match: Reeza Hendricks (Lions)
Kwena Maphaka (Lions)

- Lions won the toss and elected to field.

=== Eliminator ===
23 October 2024
18:00 (D/N)
Scorecard

Western Province; 166/5 (20 overs)	v	North West; 125 (15.3 overs)
George Linde 49* (23); Gideon Peters 3/24 (4 overs)		Wihan Lubbe 46 (20); Kyle Simmonds 3/14 (4 overs)

Western Province won by 41 runs
Wanderers Stadium, Johannesburg
Umpires: Arno Jacobs and Allahudien Paleker

- North West won the toss and elected to field.

=== Qualifier 2 ===
25 October 2024
18:00 (D/N)
Scorecard

Titans; 182/7 (20 overs)	v	Western Province; 163/6 (20 overs)
Andile Phehlukwayo 39* (16); Mihlali Mpongwana 2/28 (3 overs)		Edward Moore 48 (31); Gerald Coetzee 2/14 (4 overs)

Titans won by 19 runs
Centurion Park, Centurion
Umpires: Arno Jacobs and Abdoellah Steenkamp
Player of the match: Andile Phehlukwayo (Titans)
Gerald Coetzee (Titans)

- Western Province won the toss and elected to field.
- Oliver Whitehead (Western Province) made his T20 debut.

=== Final ===
27 October 2024
18:00 (D/N)
Scorecard

Titans; 119 (19.2 overs)	v	Lions; 124/2 (15.1 overs)
Gerald Coetzee 20 (19); Lutho Sipamla 4/12 (4 overs)		Connor Esterhuizen 48* (36); Dayyaan Galiem 1/14 (3 overs)

Lions won by 8 wickets
Wanderers Stadium, Johannesburg
Umpires: Arno Jacobs and Siphelele Gasa
Player of the match: Lutho Sipamla (Lions)
Connor Esterhuizen (Lions)

- Titans won the toss and elected to bat.

== See also ==
- 2024–25 CSA T20 Knock-Out Competition
