= Marno (given name) =

Marno is a given name. Notable people with the given name include:

- Marno Frederickson (1906–1992), Canadian curler
- Marno van Greuning (born 1997), South African cricketer
- Marno Redelinghuys (born 1993), South African rugby union player
- Marno Verbeek (born 1965), Dutch econometrician
