= Moseki =

Mosweu is a surname of Botswanan origin. Notable people with the surname include:

- Itumaleng Moseki (born 1991), South African cricketer
- Itumeleng Moseki (born 1940), Anglican bishop of Kimberley and Kuruman
- Oganeditse Moseki (born 1979), Botswana sprinter
