= Tian Koekemoer =

South African cricketer (born 1994)

Personal information
- Born: 21 September 1994 (age 32)
- Source: ESPNcricinfo, 14 January 2017

Tian Koekemoer (born 21 September 1994) is a South African professional cricketer. He made his first-class debut for Eastern Province in the 2015–16 Sunfoil 3-Day Cup on 8 October 2015. In September 2018, he was named in Eastern Province's squad for the 2018 Africa T20 Cup. He was the leading run-scorer for Eastern Province in the 2018–19 CSA 3-Day Provincial Cup, with 697 runs in ten matches. In April 2021, he was named in KwaZulu-Natal Inland's squad, ahead of the 2021–22 cricket season in South Africa.
