= Sean Jamison =

South African cricketer (born 1990)

Personal information
- Born: 27 January 1990 (age 36); Springs, Gauteng, South Africa
- Source: Cricinfo, 7 November 2015

Sean Jamison (born 27 January 1990) is a South African cricketer who played for the Highveld Lions cricket team. He was the leading wicket-taker in the 2017–18 Sunfoil 3-Day Cup for Gauteng, with 32 dismissals in eight matches. He was also the leading wicket-taker for Gauteng in the 2018–19 CSA 3-Day Provincial Cup, with 37 dismissals in seven matches. In April 2021, he was named in Border's squad, ahead of the 2021–22 cricket season in South Africa.
