= Hlompo Modimokwane =

South African cricketer (born 1998)

Personal information
- Born: 3 October 1998 (age 28)
- Source: Cricinfo, 19 October 2018

Hlompo Modimokwane (born 3 October 1998) is a South African cricketer. He made his first-class debut for North West in the 2018–19 CSA 3-Day Provincial Cup on 18 October 2018. He made his List A debut for North West in the 2018–19 CSA Provincial One-Day Challenge on 21 October 2018.
