= Mncedisi Malika =

South African cricketer (born 1997)

Personal information
- Born: 12 June 1997 (age 29)
- Source: ESPNcricinfo, 7 September 2016

Mncedisi Malika (born 12 June 1997) is a South African first-class cricketer. He was included in the Border squad for the 2016 Africa T20 Cup. He made his List A debut for Border in the 2016–17 CSA Provincial One-Day Challenge on 23 October 2016. In August 2018, he was named in Border's squad for the 2018 Africa T20 Cup. He was the leading run-scorer for Border in the 2018–19 CSA 3-Day Provincial Cup, with 496 runs in ten matches. In April 2021, he was named in Border's squad, ahead of the 2021–22 cricket season in South Africa.
