= Stefan Tait =

South African cricketer (born 1996)

Personal information
- Born: 14 March 1996 (age 30)
- Source: Cricinfo, 28 October 2018

Stefan Tait (born 14 March 1996) is a South African cricketer. He made his List A debut for South Western Districts in the 2018–19 CSA Provincial One-Day Challenge on 28 October 2018. He made his first-class debut for South Western Districts in the 2018–19 CSA 3-Day Provincial Cup on 1 November 2018. He was the leading wicket-taker for South Western Districts in the 2018–19 CSA Provincial One-Day Challenge, with 16 dismissals in nine matches.

In April 2021, Tait was named in the South Africa Emerging Men's squad for their six-match tour of Namibia. He made his Twenty20 debut on 12 February 2022, for Warriors in the 2021–22 CSA T20 Challenge.
