= Phaphama Fojela =

South African cricketer (born 1984)

Personal information
- Born: 28 August 1984 (age 42); King William's Town, South Africa
- Source: Cricinfo, 1 September 2015

Phaphama Fojela (born 28 August 1984) is a South African cricketer. He was included in the Border cricket team for the 2015 Africa T20 Cup.

He was the joint-leading wicket-taker in the 2017–18 Sunfoil 3-Day Cup for Border, with 26 dismissals in nine matches. In August 2018, he was named in Border's squad for the 2018 Africa T20 Cup. He was the leading wicket-taker for Border in the 2018–19 CSA 3-Day Provincial Cup, with 31 dismissals in seven matches. In April 2021, he was named in Border's squad, ahead of the 2021–22 cricket season in South Africa.
