= Mujaahid Toffar =

South African cricketer (born 1998)

Personal information
- Born: 12 September 1998 (age 28)
- Source: Cricinfo, 23 February 2019

Mujaahid Toffar (born 12 September 1998) is a South African cricketer. He made his first-class debut for Western Province in the 2018–19 CSA 3-Day Provincial Cup on 21 February 2019.
