= Makhaya Ntini =

South African cricketer (born 1977)

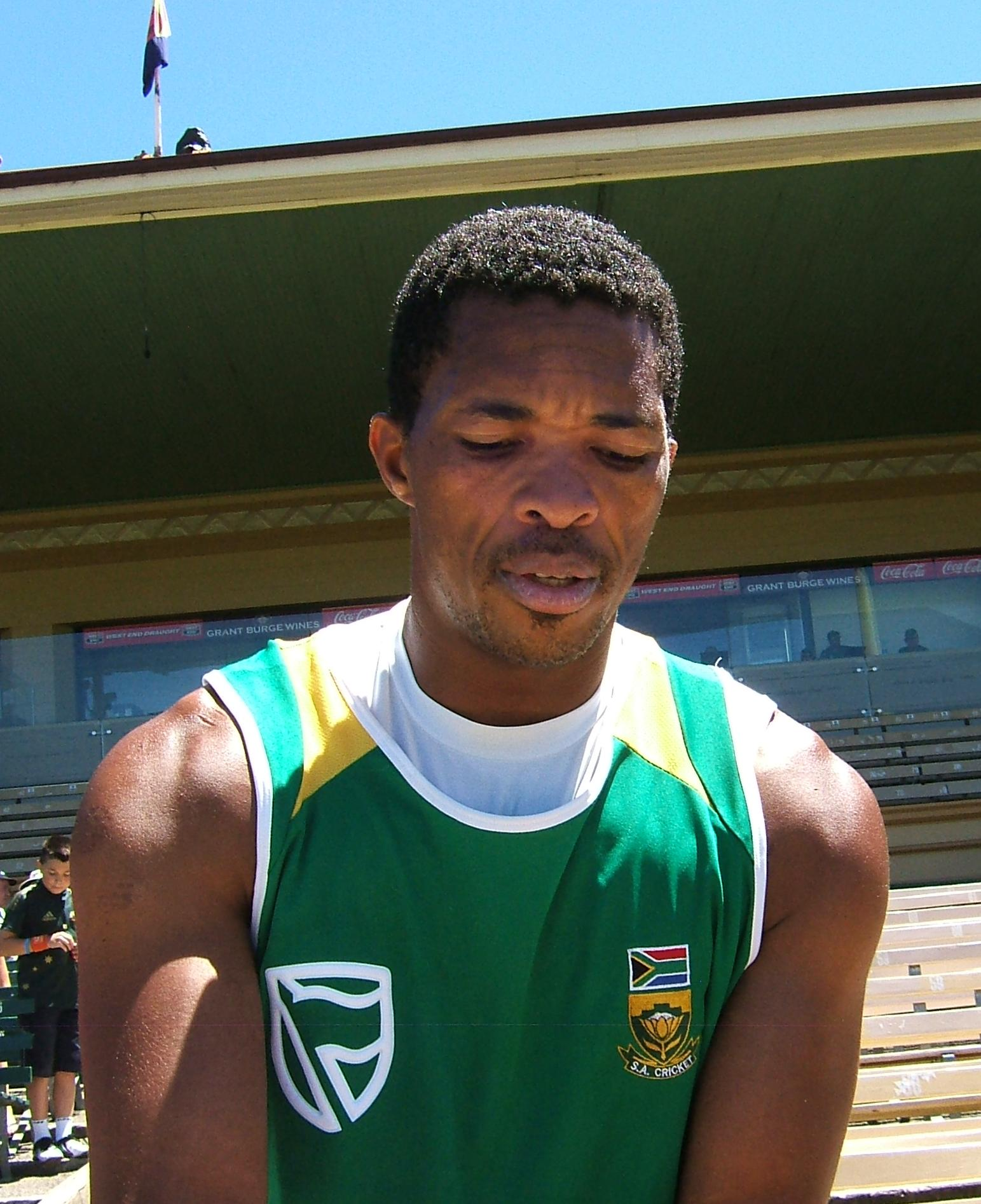
- Ntini in 2009

Personal information
- Full name: Makhaya Ntini
- Born: 6 July 1977 (age 49); KwaMdingi, King William's Town, Eastern Cape, South Africa
- Nickname: Mdingi Express
- Height: 175 cm (5 ft 9 in)
- Batting: Right-handed
- Bowling: Right-arm fast
- Role: Bowler
- Relatives: Thando Ntini (son)

International information
- National side: South Africa (1998–2011)
- Test debut (cap 269): 19 March 1998 v Sri Lanka
- Last Test: 26 December 2009 v England
- ODI debut (cap 47): 16 January 1998 v New Zealand
- Last ODI: 17 April 2009 v Australia
- ODI shirt no.: 16
- T20I debut (cap 9): 21 October 2005 v New Zealand
- Last T20I: 9 January 2011 v India

Domestic team information
- Years: Team
- 1995/96–2003/04: Border
- 2004/05–2012/13: Warriors
- 2005: Warwickshire
- 2008: Chennai Super Kings
- 2010: Kent

Career statistics
Competition	Test	ODI	FC	LA
Matches	101	173	190	275
Runs scored	699	199	1,284	328
Batting average	9.84	8.65	9.44	7.45
100s/50s	0/0	0/0	0/0	0/0
Top score	32*	42*	34*	42*
Balls bowled	20,834	8,687	35,039	13,053
Wickets	390	266	651	388
Bowling average	28.82	24.65	28.98	25.28
5 wickets in innings	18	4	27	6
10 wickets in match	4	0	5	0
Best bowling	7/37	6/22	7/37	6/22
Catches/stumpings	25/–	30/–	40/–	50/–
Medal record
Representing South Africa
Men's Cricket
Commonwealth Games
Gold medal – first place	1998 Kuala Lumpur	List-A cricket
- Source: ESPNcricinfo, 30 August 2017

Makhaya Ntini OIS (born 6 July 1977) is a South African former professional cricketer, who played all forms of the game. He was the first black player to play for the South African national cricket team. Ntini made his Test cricket debut against Sri Lanka, One Day International debut against New Zealand in 1998. Ntini was a member of the South Africa team that won the 1998 ICC KnockOut Trophy.

He reached second place in the ICC Test match bowling ratings and was the third South African cricketer to take 300 Test cricket wickets, after Shaun Pollock and Allan Donald. In December 2017, his son Thando Ntini was named in South Africa's squad for the 2018 Under-19 Cricket World Cup. He played his last match against India in 2011.

A genuine fast bowler, his fastest recorded delivery was measured at 151 km/h (around 94 mph).

== Early recognition ==
Ntini was born in Mdingi, a village in the Eastern Cape province, which is near Qonce. He was discovered by a Border Cricket Board development officer, who was setting up a mini-cricket programme. Although Ntini was both too old and too big to participate in the programme the officer, Raymond Booi, noticed the bared-footed cowherd's enthusiasm and talent for bowling. He lent the 15-year-old Ntini a pair of plimsolls and arranged for him to participate in a net session in King William's Town. Ntini impressed Booi, who contacted Greg Hayes, the head of the development programme. The pair placed Ntini in a junior cricket festival in Queenstown and Hayes purchased Ntini his first pair of boots for the festival, but later had to give the young bowler instructions not to wear them indoor or when herding cattle.

Two years later, he was selected to tour England with the South Africa Under-19 squad and played all five of the youth internationals. England dominated both One Day Internationals (ODIs) during the tour, with the South Africans only managing to take one wicket across the two matches, which fell to Pierre Joubert. In the Test series, which England won 2–0, Ntini claimed nine wickets, the second-most by a South African bowler. His bowling was expensive, coming at a rate of 4.53 runs per over: more than any other South African with the exception of Mark Boucher, who is best known as a wicket-keeper.

== Domestic career ==
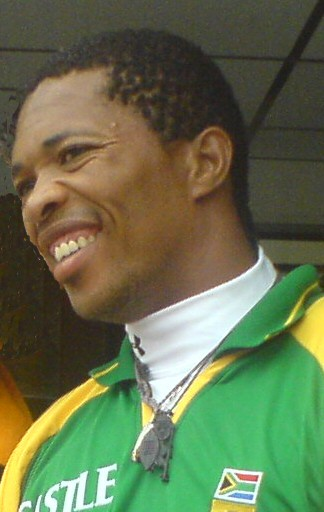
Ntini at Edgbaston, 31 July 2008

After two matches for Border against the touring Kenyans, Ntini made his First-class cricket debut in November 1995, facing an England XI. He claimed two wickets in England's only innings as Border were beaten comprehensively.

In his debut season, Ntini claimed 17 wickets at an average of 37.05 in First-class competitions. His best performance in an innings came against Free State, when he claimed three wickets for 49 runs (3/49) during his 17 overs. He again toured with the national Under-19s in March and April 1996, touring India, where he played three youth Tests and one of the three ODIs. After claiming five wickets in the first Test and none in the second, Ntini displayed his talent in the third match, taking 6/53 in the first innings and 3/48 in the second innings.

== International career ==
Ntini returned to the South African team for a Sharjah tournament in 2000. His improvement was clear as he bowled with greater control.

A graph showing Ntini's Test career bowling statistics and how they have varied over time.

In 2003, he became the first South African to take 10 wickets at Lord's. His best performance, however, came when Ntini took 13 wickets for 132 runs against the West Indies in the Port of Spain on 12 April 2005. This remains the most wickets taken by a South African cricketer in a Test match. On 3 March 2006, Ntini also achieved the best bowling figures by a South African in an ODI, demolishing Australia with 6 wickets for 22 runs. A popular figure in South African sport, Ntini was voted their favourite sportsman in a research poll conducted by the South African Press Association. For his performances in 2006 and 2007, he was named in the World Test XI by ICC. He was also named in the World Test XI by ESPNcricinfo.

Ntini went on to establish himself as South Africa's premier fast bowler and one of the leading fast bowlers in the world. In February 2009, he was ranked as the world's fifth-best Test bowler behind Muttiah Muralitharan, Dale Steyn, Stuart Clark and Mitchell Johnson, but had dropped to being 25th-best ODI bowler, according to the ICC rankings.

On 20 January 2007, Ntini dislodged Mohammad Sami to take his 300th Test wicket in his 74th Test. On 1 August 2008, he removed England opener Alastair Cook to claim his 350th Test wicket in his 90th Test.

Ntini played his 100th Test on 16 December 2009, becoming the only black South African cricketer to reach that mark. Sponsors Castle Lager promised every fan in attendance a free beer in celebration on the day he took his first wicket and he duly obliged on the second day when he bowled Andrew Strauss of England. However, after already having lost his place in the ODI team, he was dropped from the Test team after poor performances against England.

Ntini retired from all forms of international cricket in a T20I against India on 9 January 2011.

To date, Ntini is one of only three players to have played more than 100 Test matches without scoring a 50. Courtney Walsh and Nathan Lyon are the others.

During his career, Ntini took 22 five-wicket hauls. As of 2020, he ranks joint seventeenth among all-time combined five-wicket haul takers (joint with Allan Donald, Malcolm Marshall and Daniel Vettori), and joint second in the equivalent list for South Africa, alongside Donald and behind Dale Steyn.

== Controversies ==
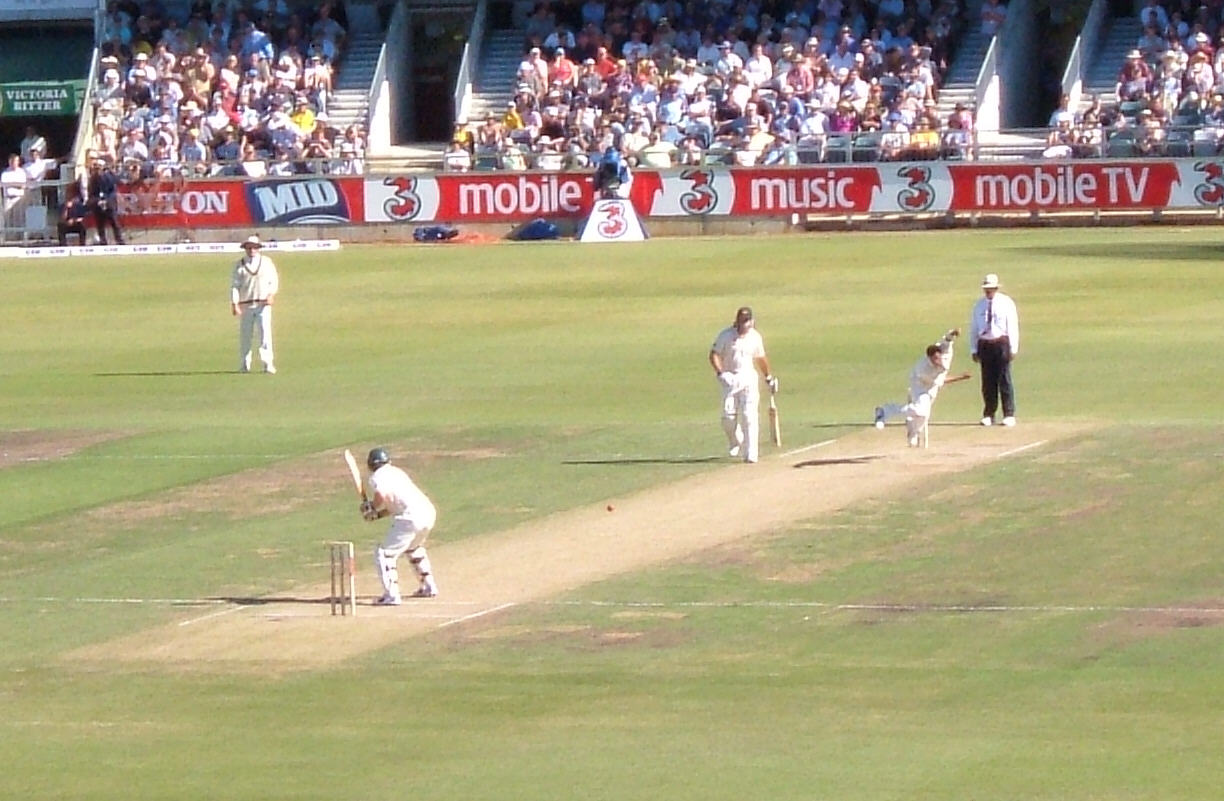
Ntini (second right) bowling at the WACA Ground in Perth on 16 December 2005, day one of the first Test, Australia v South Africa. He took 5 wickets for 64 runs on the day, having previously made his international debut at the same venue in 1998.

Ntini's career looked like coming to an early end in 1999 when he was charged and then convicted of rape, although he was finally acquitted. The case caused controversy in South Africa, with his conviction generating negative publicity in view of his status as the first black South African Test cricketer. Ntini maintained his innocence, was acquitted on appeal and rebuilt his international cricket career. Ntini thanked Cricket South Africa for sticking by him.

On 17 July 2020, while on SABC 2's Morning Live, Ntini detailed the alleged racism he experienced throughout his career. He claimed other players would not sit with him during meals and said he "was forever lonely" in the Proteas team. Ntini further stated that he used to run to the stadium and back to hotels to avoid being lonely on the team bus. Ntini's comments came shortly after fellow South African cricketer Lungi Ngidi called for the national team to show support towards the Black Lives Matter movement.

== Coaching career ==
In January 2016, Ntini was appointed as the assistant coach of the Zimbabwean national cricket team with a two-year contract. Following the sacking of the previous coach Dav Whatmore, Ntini was appointed as interim head coach for the home series against India in 2016. He resigned from the role as coach in January 2018, although Ntini was reported to have claimed that he was asked to step down by the board on the basis of alleged complaints from the players over his coaching methods.
