= Kulani Baloyi =

South African cricketer (born 1996)

Personal information
- Born: 17 May 1996 (age 30)
- Source: Cricinfo, 15 September 2018

Kulani Baloyi (born 17 May 1996) is a South African cricketer. He made his Twenty20 debut for Northerns in the 2018 Africa T20 Cup on 15 September 2018. He made his List A debut for Northerns in the 2018–19 CSA Provincial One-Day Challenge on 17 March 2019. He made his first-class debut for Northerns in the final of the 2018–19 CSA 3-Day Provincial Cup on 11 April 2019.
