= Kagiso Mohale =

South African cricketer (born 1994)

Personal information
- Born: 1 January 1994 (age 32); Kimberley, South Africa'
- Source: Cricinfo, 4 September 2015

Kagiso Mohale, first name also written Kagisho (born 1 January 1994) is a South African cricketer. He was included in the Griqualand West cricket team for the 2015 Africa T20 Cup. In September 2018, he was named in Northern Cape's squad for the 2018 Africa T20 Cup. He was the leading wicket-taker for Northern Cape in the 2018–19 CSA 3-Day Provincial Cup, with 16 dismissals in nine matches.

In September 2019, he was named in Northern Cape's squad for the 2019–20 CSA Provincial T20 Cup. In April 2021, he was named in Northern Cape's squad, ahead of the 2021–22 cricket season in South Africa.
