= Josh van Eeden =

South African cricketer (born 1996)

Personal information
- Born: 11 July 1996 (age 30)
- Source: Cricinfo, 26 March 2017

Josh van Eeden (born 11 July 1996) is a South African cricketer. He made his List A debut for KwaZulu-Natal Inland in the 2016–17 CSA Provincial One-Day Challenge on 26 March 2017. He made his first-class debut for KwaZulu-Natal Inland in the 2018–19 CSA 3-Day Provincial Cup on 8 November 2018.
