= Sinenhlanhla Zwane =

South African cricketer (born 2000)

Personal information
- Born: 22 July 2000 (age 26); Wattville, Gauteng, South Africa
- Source: Cricinfo, 16 March 2019

Sinenhlanhla Zwane (born 22 July 2000) is a South African cricketer. He made his first-class debut for Easterns in the 2018–19 CSA 3-Day Provincial Cup on 14 March 2019. In April 2021, he was named to Easterns' squad, ahead of the 2021–22 cricket season in South Africa. He made his Twenty20 debut on 9 October 2021, for Easterns in the 2021–22 CSA Provincial T20 Knock-Out tournament. He made his List A debut on 3 April 2022, for Easterns in the 2021–22 CSA One-Day Cup.
