= Attie Maposa =

South African cricketer (born 1990)

Personal information
- Born: 22 April 1990 (age 36); Umzimkulu, South Africa
- Source: Cricinfo, 1 September 2015

Attie Maposa (born 22 April 1990) is a South African first-class cricketer. He was included in the KZN Inland squad for the 2015 Africa T20 Cup. In September 2018, he was named in KwaZulu-Natal Inland's squad for the 2018 Africa T20 Cup. He was the leading wicket-taker for KwaZulu-Natal Inland in the 2018–19 CSA 3-Day Provincial Cup, with 21 dismissals in nine matches.
