= Yamkela Oliphant =

South African cricketer (born 1996)

Personal information
- Born: 2 April 1996 (age 30)
- Source: Cricinfo, 11 March 2018

Yamkela Oliphant (born 2 April 1996) is a South African cricketer. He made his List A debut for Border in the 2017–18 CSA Provincial One-Day Challenge on 11 March 2018. In September 2018, he was named in South Western Districts' squad for the 2018 Africa T20 Cup. He made his Twenty20 debut for South Western Districts in the 2018 Africa T20 Cup on 15 September 2018. He made his first-class debut for South Western Districts in the 2018–19 CSA 3-Day Provincial Cup on 25 October 2018.
