= Itumaleng Moseki =

South African cricketer (born 1991)

Personal information
- Born: 26 August 1991 (age 35)
- Source: Cricinfo, 15 December 2018

Itumaleng Moseki (born 26 August 1991) is a South African cricketer. He made his first-class debut for Northerns in the 2018–19 CSA 3-Day Provincial Cup on 13 December 2018. He made his List A debut for Northerns in the 2018–19 CSA Provincial One-Day Challenge on 17 March 2019.
