= Mthiwekhaya Nabe =

South African cricketer (born 1995)

Personal information
- Full name: Mthiwekhaya Nabe
- Born: 31 October 1995 (age 31)
- Source: Cricinfo, 4 November 2016

Mthiwekhaya Nabe (born 31 October 1995) is a South African cricketer. He made his first-class debut for Western Province in the 2015–16 Sunfoil 3-Day Cup on 18 March 2016. He made his Twenty20 debut for Western Province in the 2017 Africa T20 Cup on 26 August 2017.

In June 2018, he was named in the squad for the Cape Cobras team for the 2018–19 season. In April 2021, he was named in Eastern Province's squad, ahead of the 2021–22 cricket season in South Africa.
