= Wesley Marshall =

South African cricketer (born 1994)

Personal information
- Born: 4 January 1994 (age 32); Kempton Park, South Africa
- Source: ESPNcricinfo, 7 September 2016

Wesley Marshall (born 4 January 1994) is a South African cricketer. He was included in the Easterns squad for the 2016 Africa T20 Cup. He was the leading run-scorer in the 2017–18 Sunfoil 3-Day Cup for Easterns, with 667 runs in ten matches.

In September 2018, he was named in Easterns' squad for the 2018 Africa T20 Cup. He was the leading run-scorer for Easterns in the 2018–19 CSA 3-Day Provincial Cup, with 797 runs in ten matches. He was also the leading run-scorer for Easterns in the 2018–19 CSA Provincial One-Day Challenge, with 515 runs in eleven matches.

In September 2019, he was named in Easterns' squad for the 2019–20 CSA Provincial T20 Cup. In April 2021, he was named in North West's squad, ahead of the 2021–22 cricket season in South Africa.
