= Ruan Terblanche =

South African cricketer (born 2001)

Personal information
- Born: 14 March 2001 (age 25)
- Source: Cricinfo, 19 January 2020

Ruan Terblanche (born 14 March 2001) is a South African cricketer. He made his first-class debut for Boland in the 2018–19 CSA 3-Day Provincial Cup on 28 March 2019. He made his List A debut on 17 November 2019, for Boland in the 2019–20 CSA Provincial One-Day Challenge. In April 2021, he was named in Boland's squad, ahead of the 2021–22 cricket season in South Africa. He made his Twenty20 debut on 6 October 2021, for Boland in the 2021–22 CSA Provincial T20 Knock-Out tournament.
