= Dyllan Matthews =

South African cricketer (born 1997)

Personal information
- Full name: Dyllan Sam Matthews
- Born: 14 April 1997 (age 29)
- Batting: Right-handed
- Bowling: Right-arm leg break
- Source: ESPNcricinfo, 4 September 2016

Dyllan Matthews (born 14 April 1997) is a South African cricketer. He made his List A debut for North West in the 2016–17 CSA Provincial One-Day Challenge on 23 October 2016.

He was the leading wicket-taker in the 2017–18 CSA Provincial One-Day Challenge tournament, with 21 dismissals in nine matches.

In September 2018, he was named in Easterns' squad for the 2018 Africa T20 Cup. The following month, he was named in Nelson Mandela Bay Giants' squad for the first edition of the Mzansi Super League T20 tournament. In September 2019, he was named in Easterns' squad for the 2019–20 CSA Provincial T20 Cup.
