= Shane Dadswell =

South African cricketer (born 1997)

Personal information
- Full name: Shane Dadswell
- Born: 18 November 1997 (age 28); Alberton, South Africa
- Batting: Right-handed
- Bowling: Right-arm medium-fast
- Role: Batter

Domestic team information
- Years: Team
- 2017–present: North-West University
- 2023–present: Pretoria Capitals
- 2026: Northern Knights
- Source: Cricinfo

Shane Dadswell (born 18 November 1997) is a South African cricketer who plays for North-West University in South Africa. In November 2017, he scored 490 runs in a 50-over game, setting a club cricket record for the highest individual score in the format. He made his List A debut for North West in the 2017–18 CSA Provincial One-Day Challenge on 26 November 2017.

In September 2018, he was named in North West's squad for the 2018 Africa T20 Cup. He made his Twenty20 debut for North West in the 2018 Africa T20 Cup on 14 September 2018. On debut, he scored 98 not out from 34 balls, which Cricket South Africa described as "the performance of the day".

He made his first-class debut for North West in the 2018–19 CSA 3-Day Provincial Cup on 8 November 2018. In September 2019, he was named in North West's squad for the 2019–20 CSA Provincial T20 Cup.
