= Nicky van den Bergh =

South African cricketer

Personal information
- Full name: Nicholas Jacques van den Bergh
- Born: 20 June 1989 (age 37); Potchefstroom, South Africa
- Source: ESPNcricinfo, 1 September 2016

Nicky van den Bergh (born 20 June 1989) is a South African cricketer. He was included in the North West squad for the 2016 Africa T20 Cup. In August 2017, he was named in Durban Qalandars' squad for the first season of the T20 Global League. However, in October 2017, Cricket South Africa initially postponed the tournament until November 2018, with it being cancelled soon after.

In June 2018, he was named in the squad for the Highveld Lions team for the 2018–19 season. In September 2018, he was named in North West's squad for the 2018 Africa T20 Cup. He was the leading run-scorer for Lions in the 2018–19 CSA 4-Day Franchise Series, with 691 runs in ten matches. In September 2019, he was named in North West's squad for the 2019–20 CSA Provincial T20 Cup. In April 2021, he was named in North West's squad, ahead of the 2021–22 cricket season in South Africa.

In February 2022, van den Bergh was named as the captain of North West for the 2021–22 CSA T20 Challenge.
