= Andile Mokgakane =

South African cricketer (born 1999)

Personal information
- Full name: Andile Charles Mokgakane
- Born: 25 December 1999 (age 26); Durban, South Africa
- Batting: Right-handed
- Bowling: Right-arm medium
- Role: Top-order batter

Domestic team information
- Years: Team
- 2017/18–2019/20: KwaZulu-Natal
- 2019/20: Dolphins
- 2020/21–2022/23: KwaZulu-Natal Inland
- 2023/24–: Eastern Province
- Source: Cricinfo, 15 July 2025

Andile Mokgakane (born 25 December 1999) is a South African cricketer. He made his Twenty20 debut for KwaZulu-Natal in the 2017 Africa T20 Cup on 8 September 2017. He made his List A debut for KwaZulu-Natal in the 2017–18 CSA Provincial One-Day Challenge on 22 October 2017.

In December 2017, he was named in South Africa's squad for the 2018 Under-19 Cricket World Cup. In January 2019, he was named in the South Africa national under-19 cricket team's squad, ahead of their tour to India. He made his first-class debut for KwaZulu-Natal in the 2018–19 CSA 3-Day Provincial Cup on 21 March 2019.

In September 2019, he was named in KwaZulu-Natal's squad for the 2019–20 CSA Provincial T20 Cup. In April 2021, he was named in KwaZulu-Natal Inland's squad, ahead of the 2021–22 cricket season in South Africa.
