= Thando Ntini =

South African cricketer

Personal information
- Full name: Masimphuthando Ntini
- Born: 7 July 2000 (age 26); East London, Eastern Cape, South Africa
- Batting: Left-handed
- Bowling: Right-arm fast
- Role: All Rounder
- Relatives: Makhaya Ntini (father)

Domestic team information
- Years: Team
- 2018/19–2019/20: Western Province
- 2019/20: Cape Cobras
- 2020/21: Titans
- 2022/23–2022/23: KwaZulu-Natal Coastal
- 2023/24: KwaZulu-Natal Inland

Career statistics
Competition	FC	LA	T20
Matches	19	23	18
Runs scored	234	147	12
Batting average	13.76	32*	6.00
100s/50s	0/0	0/0	0/0
Top score	40	26	7
Balls bowled	2,428	927	306
Wickets	40	26	18
Bowling average	32.60	35.76	26.44
5 wickets in innings	0	0	0
10 wickets in match	0	0	0
Best bowling	4/98	4/36	2/21
Catches/stumpings	6/–	3/–	2/–
- Source: CricketArchive, 6 December 2023

Masimphuthando Ntini (born 7 July 2000) is a South African cricketer. In August 2018, he was awarded a senior contract by Cricket South Africa ahead of the 2018–19 domestic season. He is the son of former cricketer Makhaya Ntini.

He made his Twenty20 debut for Western Province in the 2018 Africa T20 Cup on 15 September 2018. Prior to his T20 debut, he was part of South Africa's squad for the 2018 Under-19 Cricket World Cup. He made his List A debut for Western Province in the 2018–19 CSA Provincial One-Day Challenge on 10 February 2019. He made his first-class debut for Western Province in the 2018–19 CSA 3-Day Provincial Cup on 14 February 2019.

In September 2019, he was named in Western Province's squad for the 2019–20 CSA Provincial T20 Cup. In April 2021, Ntini was named in the South Africa Emerging Men's squad for their six-match tour of Namibia. Later the same month, he was named in KwaZulu-Natal's squad, ahead of the 2021–22 cricket season in South Africa.
