= Garnett Tarr =

South African cricketer (born 2000)

Personal information
- Born: 2 July 2000 (age 26)
- Batting: Right-handed
- Role: Wicket-keeper

Domestic team information
- Years: Team
- Northern Cape
- Knights
- Source: Cricinfo, 2 March 2019

Garnett Tarr (born 2 July 2000) is a South African cricketer. He made his first-class debut for Northern Cape in the 2018–19 CSA 3-Day Provincial Cup on 28 February 2019. He made his List A debut for Northern Cape in the 2018–19 CSA Provincial One-Day Challenge on 24 March 2019.
