= Niel Hornbuckle =

South African cricketer (born 1991)

Personal information
- Born: 24 September 1991 (age 35); Bloemfontein, South Africa
- Source: ESPNcricinfo, 13 September 2016

Niel Hornbuckle (born 24 September 1991) is a South African cricketer. He was included in the South Western Districts cricket team for the 2016 Africa T20 Cup. In September 2018, he was named in South Western Districts' squad for the 2018 Africa T20 Cup.
