= Marno van Greuning =

South African cricketer (born 1997)

Personal information
- Born: 27 August 1997 (age 29)
- Source: Cricinfo, 2 March 2019

Marno van Greuning (born 27 August 1997) is a South African cricketer. He made his first-class debut for Free State in the 2018–19 CSA 3-Day Provincial Cup on 28 February 2019.
