= Clayton Bosch =

South African cricketer (born 1992)

Personal information
- Full name: Clayton Gregory Bosch
- Born: 10 November 1992 (age 34); Graaff-Reinet, South Africa
- Source: ESPNcricinfo, 2 September 2016

Clayton Bosch (born 10 November 1992) is a South African cricketer. He was included in Border's squad for the 2015 Africa T20 Cup. In August 2018, he was named in Border's squad for the 2018 Africa T20 Cup. In April 2021, he was named in Border's squad, ahead of the 2021–22 cricket season in South Africa.
