= Johnny Riekert =

South African cricketer (born 1992)

Personal information
- Born: 3 February 1992 (age 34)
- Source: Cricinfo, 3 November 2018

Johnny Riekert (born 3 February 1992) is a South African cricketer. He made his first-class debut for KwaZulu-Natal in the 2015–16 Sunfoil 3-Day Cup on 1 November 2018.
