= Keith Dudgeon (South African cricketer) =

South African cricketer (born 1995)

Personal information
- Full name: Keith Jack Dudgeon
- Born: 7 November 1995 (age 31); Johannesburg, South Africa
- Batting: Right-handed
- Bowling: Right-arm fast-medium
- Role: Bowler

Domestic team information
- Years: Team
- 2014/15–2016/17: Gauteng
- 2016/17: Lions
- 2017/18–2018/19: KwaZulu-Natal
- 2017/18–2019/20: Dolphins
- 2019/20–2020/21: KwaZulu-Natal Coastal
- 2021/22–2023/24: KwaZulu-Natal Inland
- 2021/22: Free State
- 2024/25: Boland
- 2024/25: Paarl Royals
- 2025–2026: Kent
- 2026–present: Sussex
- FC debut: 16 October 2014 Gauteng v North West
- LA debut: 21 December 2014 Gauteng v KawZulu-Natal Inland

Career statistics
Competition	FC	LA	T20
Matches	93	55	51
Runs scored	1,846	513	491
Batting average	18.83	16.54	16.93
100s/50s	0/6	0/1	0/0
Top score	88	71	36*
Balls bowled	13,572	2,603	1,019
Wickets	281	81	60
Bowling average	26.96	25.71	22.00
5 wickets in innings	13	2	0
10 wickets in match	1	0	0
Best bowling	7/36	7/35	4/5
Catches/stumpings	46/–	17/–	20/–
- Source: Cricinfo, 27 September 2026

Keith Dudgeon (born 7 November 1995) is a South African cricketer. He was included in the Gauteng cricket team for the 2015 Africa T20 Cup. He was the joint-leading wicket-taker in the 2017–18 Sunfoil 3-Day Cup for KwaZulu-Natal, with 35 dismissals in ten matches.

In September 2018, he was named in KwaZulu-Natal's squad for the 2018 Africa T20 Cup. He was the leading wicket-taker for KwaZulu-Natal in the 2018–19 CSA 3-Day Provincial Cup, with 38 dismissals in eight matches. In April 2021, he was named in KwaZulu-Natal Inland's squad, ahead of the 2021–22 cricket season in South Africa. In November 2021, Dudgeon was signed by C.I.Y.M.S. Cricket Club to play in Ireland during the 2022 season.

In March 2025, he was signed by Kent County Cricket Club to play in the County Championship. He took a first-class career-best seven wickets for 36 runs in the second innings of his debut against Northamptonshire in April. Dudgeon suffered a knee injury in training the following week which brought an end to his stint at Kent for the season. He returned to the county for the 2026 season. Dudgeon joined Sussex on a two-year contract in October 2026.
