= Ruan Haasbroek =

South African cricketer (born 1997)

Personal information
- Born: 18 April 1997 (age 29)
- Source: ESPNcricinfo, 18 December 2016

Ruan Haasbroek (born 18 April 1997) is a South African cricketer. He made his List A debut for North West in the 2016–17 CSA Provincial One-Day Challenge on 18 December 2016. He made his Twenty20 debut for North West in the 2017 Africa T20 Cup on 1 September 2017. He made his first-class debut for North West in the 2017–18 Sunfoil 3-Day Cup on 2 November 2017.

In September 2018, he was named in North West's squad for the 2018 Africa T20 Cup. He was the leading run-scorer for North West in the 2018–19 CSA 3-Day Provincial Cup, with 518 runs in ten matches. In September 2019, he was named in North West's squad for the 2019–20 CSA Provincial T20 Cup. In April 2021, he was named in Gauteng's squad, ahead of the 2021–22 cricket season in South Africa.
