= Marno Verbeek =

Economist

Marno Verbeek is a professor of finance at Rotterdam School of Management, Erasmus University in Rotterdam. His main areas of research are empirical finance, particular analysing mutual funds, hedge funds, asset pricing, investment strategies, survival bias and performance evaluation. He has extensive publications in Finance, Economics and Econometrics and he is the author of the noted textbook A Guide to Modern Econometrics (as of 2017 in its 5th edition). He serves as an editor of De Economist the Netherlands Economic Review.

== Selected publications ==
- Verbeek, M. (2021). Panel Methods for Finance: A Guide to Panel Data Econometrics for Financial Applications, De Gruyter.
- Verbeek, M. (2017). A guide to modern econometrics. 5th Edition, John Wiley & Sons.
- Verbeek, M., & Nijman, T. (1992). Testing for selectivity bias in panel data models. International Economic Review, 681–703.
