= Glenton Stuurman =

South African cricketer (born 1992)

- Stuurman in 2026

Personal information
- Born: 10 August 1992 (age 34); Oudtshoorn, Cape Province, South Africa
- Batting: Right-handed
- Bowling: Right-arm medium-fast
- Role: Bowler

International information
- National side: South Africa
- Test debut (cap 351): 17 February 2022 v New Zealand
- Last Test: 8 April 2022 v Bangladesh
- Only T20I (cap 89): 13 February 2021 v Pakistan

Domestic team information
- Years: Team
- 2016–present: SW Districts
- 2017: Band-e-Amir Dragons
- 2026: Kent

Career statistics
| Competition | Test | T20I | FC | LA |
|---|---|---|---|---|
| Matches | 2 | 1 | 87 | 59 |
| Runs scored | 11 | – | 1,447 | 286 |
| Batting average | 5.50 | – | 14.04 | 11.44 |
| 100s/50s | 0/0 | – | 0/3 | 0/1 |
| Top score | 11 | – | 86 | 52 |
| Balls bowled | 174 | 12 | 14,138 | 2,552 |
| Wickets | 1 | 0 | 288 | 75 |
| Bowling average | 124.00 | – | 24.54 | 26.94 |
| 5 wickets in innings | 0 | – | 17 | 2 |
| 10 wickets in match | 0 | – | 2 | 0 |
| Best bowling | 1/124 | – | 7/12 | 6/18 |
| Catches/stumpings | 0/– | 0/– | 35/– | 15/– |
- Source: Cricinfo, 27 September 2026

Glenton Stuurman (born 10 August 1992) is a South African cricketer. He made his international debut for the South Africa cricket team in February 2021.

== Career ==
Stuurman was included in the South Western Districts cricket team squad for the 2016 Africa T20 Cup. He was the leading wicket-taker in the 2017–18 CSA Provincial One-Day Challenge tournament for South Western Districts, with 12 dismissals in five matches. In September 2018, he was named in Eastern Province's squad for the 2018 Africa T20 Cup. He was the leading wicket-taker in the 2018–19 CSA 3-Day Provincial Cup with 39 dismissals in eight matches.

In November 2020, Stuurman was named in South Africa's squad for their limited overs series against England. In December 2020, Stuurman was named in South Africa's Test squad for their series against Sri Lanka. In January 2021, he was named in South Africa's Twenty20 International (T20I) squad for their series against Pakistan. He made his T20I debut for South Africa, against Pakistan, on 13 February 2021.

In April 2021, he was named in Eastern Province's squad, ahead of the 2021–22 cricket season in South Africa. In December 2021, Stuurman was named in South Africa's Test squad for the series against India. In January 2022, he received a further call-up to the Test side, for their tour of New Zealand. He made his Test debut on 17 February 2022, for South Africa against New Zealand.

In January 2026, Stuurman agreed a contract to join Kent County Cricket Club as an overseas player for the first six matches of that year's County Championship season.
