= Sithembile Langa =

South African cricketer (born 1995)

Personal information
- Born: 9 February 1995 (age 31); East London, Eastern Cape, South Africa
- Source: ESPNcricinfo, 30 October 2016

Sithembile Langa (born 9 February 1995) is a South African cricketer. He made his List A debut for Border in the 2016–17 CSA Provincial One-Day Challenge on 30 October 2016. He made his first-class debut for Border in the 2016–17 Sunfoil 3-Day Cup on 23 March 2017. He made his Twenty20 debut for Border in the 2017 Africa T20 Cup on 15 September 2017.

He was the leading wicket-taker in the 2017–18 CSA Provincial One-Day Challenge tournament for Border, with 17 dismissals in ten matches. He was also the joint-leading wicket-taker in the 2017–18 Sunfoil 3-Day Cup for Border, with 26 dismissals in nine matches.

In September 2019, he was named in Eastern Province's squad for the 2019–20 CSA Provincial T20 Cup. In April 2021, he was named in Limpopo's squad, ahead of the 2021–22 cricket season in South Africa.
