= Ryan Hendricks =

South African cricket umpire (born 1974)

Ryan Neil Hendricks
Personal information
- Full name: Ryan Neil Hendricks
- Born: 27 January 1974 (age 52); Kimberley, South Africa
- Role: Umpire

Umpiring information
- WODIs umpired: 3 (2016)
- WT20Is umpired: 3 (2023)
- Source: ESPNcricinfo, 29 January 2023

Ryan Neil Hendricks (born 27 January 1974) is a cricket umpire from South Africa. He was the umpire for the match played between the Western Province and North West. He is part of Cricket South Africa's umpire panel for first-class matches.
