= Joshua Richards =

South African cricketer (born 1998)

Personal information
- Born: 20 December 1998 (age 27)
- Source: Cricinfo, 4 October 2018

Joshua Richards (born 20 December 1998) is a South African cricketer. He made his first-class debut for Gauteng in the 2018–19 CSA 3-Day Provincial Cup on 4 October 2018, scoring a century in the first innings. He made his List A debut for Gauteng in the 2018–19 CSA Provincial One-Day Challenge on 7 October 2018. He was the leading run-scorer for Gauteng in the 2018–19 CSA 3-Day Provincial Cup, with 828 runs in nine matches.

In September 2019, he was named in Gauteng's squad for the 2019–20 CSA Provincial T20 Cup. He made his Twenty20 debut for Gauteng in the 2019–20 CSA Provincial T20 Cup on 13 September 2019.

In April 2021, Richards was named in the South Africa Emerging Men's squad for their six-match tour of Namibia. Later the same month, he was named in Gauteng's squad, ahead of the 2021–22 cricket season in South Africa.
