= Kyle Simmonds =

South African cricketer (born 1994)

Personal information
- Born: 6 January 1994 (age 32); Durban, South Africa
- Source: ESPNcricinfo, 21 September 2016

Kyle Simmonds (born 6 January 1994) is a South African first-class cricketer. He was included in Boland's squad for the 2016 Africa T20 Cup. In August 2017, he was named in Stellenbosch Monarchs' squad for the first season of the T20 Global League. However, in October 2017, Cricket South Africa initially postponed the tournament until November 2018, with it being cancelled soon after.

In September 2018, he was named in Boland's squad for the 2018 Africa T20 Cup. He was the leading wicket-taker for Boland in the 2018–19 CSA 3-Day Provincial Cup, with 32 dismissals in seven matches. He was also the leading wicket-taker for Boland in the 2018–19 CSA Provincial One-Day Challenge, with 14 dismissals in nine matches. In April 2021, he was named in Western Province's squad, ahead of the 2021–22 cricket season in South Africa.
