= Johannes Diseko =

South African cricketer (born 1990)

Personal information
- Born: 2 October 1990 (age 36); Potchefstroom, South Africa
- Source: Cricinfo, 3 September 2015

Johannes Diseko (born 2 October 1990) is a South African cricketer. He was included in the North West cricket team squad for the 2015 Africa T20 Cup. In September 2018, he was named in North West's squad for the 2018 Africa T20 Cup. In September 2019, he was named in North West's squad for the 2019–20 CSA Provincial T20 Cup. In April 2021, he was named in North West's squad, ahead of the 2021–22 cricket season in South Africa.
