= Junaid Dawood =

South African cricketer (born 1996)

Personal information
- Born: 2 October 1996 (age 30); Cape Town, South Africa
- Source: ESPNcricinfo, 25 September 2016

Junaid Dawood (born 2 October 1996) is a South African professional cricketer. He made his Twenty20 debut for Eastern Province against KwaZulu-Natal in the 2016 Africa T20 Cup on 25 September 2016. He made his first-class debut for Eastern Province in the 2016–17 Sunfoil 3-Day Cup on 20 October 2016. He made his List A debut for Eastern Province in the 2016–17 CSA Provincial One-Day Challenge on 15 January 2017.

In July 2018, he was named in the Cricket South Africa Emerging Squad. In September 2019, he was named in Western Province's squad for the 2019–20 CSA Provincial T20 Cup.
