= Lwandiswa Zuma =

South African cricketer (born 1996)

Personal information
- Born: 11 July 1996 (age 30); Pietermaritzburg, South Africa
- Source: Cricinfo, 6 September 2015

Lwandiswa Zuma (born 11 July 1996) is a South African first-class cricketer. He was included in the Free State cricket team squad for the 2015 Africa T20 Cup. In September 2018, he was named in KwaZulu-Natal Inland's squad for the 2018 Africa T20 Cup. In April 2021, he was named in North West's squad, ahead of the 2021–22 cricket season in South Africa.
