= Imran Manack =

South African cricketer (born 1991)

Personal information
- Born: 23 December 1991 (age 34); Johannesburg, Transvaal Province, South Africa
- Batting: Right handed
- Bowling: Right arm Offbreak
- Role: Bowler

Career statistics
Competition	FC	LA	T20
Matches	32	55	64
Runs scored	548	445	151
Batting average	14.42	17.80	10.78
100s/50s	0/1	0/2	0/0
Top score	55*	51*	30
Balls bowled	3723	2718	1404
Wickets	57	79	50
Bowling average	36.89	25.84	29.02
5 wickets in innings	1	0	0
10 wickets in match	0	0	0
Best bowling	5/78	4/24	4/14
Catches/stumpings	23/–	25/–	14/–
- Source: Cricinfo, 29 March 2025

Imran Manack (born 23 December 1991) is a South African cricketer. He made his first-class debut for Easterns in the 2012–13 CSA Provincial Three-Day Competition on 31 January 2013. He made his List A debut for Easterns in the 2013–14 CSA Provincial One-Day Competition on 13 October 2013.

In September 2018, he was named in Easterns' squad for the 2018 Africa T20 Cup. He was the leading wicket-taker for Easterns in the 2018–19 CSA Provincial One-Day Challenge, with 22 dismissals in nine matches. In September 2019, he was named in Easterns' squad for the 2019–20 CSA Provincial T20 Cup. In April 2021, he was named in Boland's squad, ahead of the 2021–22 cricket season in South Africa.
