= Dayyaan Galiem =

South African cricketer

Personal information
- Full name: Abdu Dayyaan Galiem
- Born: 2 January 1997 (age 29); Cape Town, Western Cape, South Africa
- Batting: Right-handed
- Bowling: Right-arm medium-fast

International information
- National side: South Africa
- Only T20I (cap 109): 13 December 2024 v Pakistan

Domestic team information
- Years: Team
- 2015: Western Province
- Source: Cricinfo, 27 January 2016

Abdu Dayyaan Galiem (born 2 January 1997) is a South African cricketer who plays for Western Province. Galiem was born in Cape Town, and educated at Rondebosch Boys High School. Playing as an all-rounder, he made his debut for Western Province in September 2015, playing against Easterns in the Africa T20 Cup. In December 2015, Galiem was named in the South African under-19s squad for the 2016 Under-19 World Cup in Bangladesh. He was originally also named in the team for the 2014 Under-19 World Cup, but was replaced by Bradley Dial prior to the tournament after suffering a knee injury.

Galiem made his first-class debut for Western Province in the 2016–17 Sunfoil 3-Day Cup on 6 October 2016. He made his List A debut for Western Province in the 2016–17 CSA Provincial One-Day Challenge on 9 October 2016.

In August 2017, Galiem was named in Cape Town Knight Riders' squad for the first season of the T20 Global League. However, in October 2017, Cricket South Africa initially postponed the tournament until November 2018, with it being cancelled soon after.

Galiem was the leading wicket-taker in the 2017–18 CSA Provincial One-Day Challenge tournament for Western Province, with ten dismissals in eight matches.

In June 2018, Galiem was named in the squad for the Cape Cobras team for the 2018–19 season. In September 2018, he was named in Western Province's squad for the 2018 Africa T20 Cup. In April 2021, Galiem was named in the South Africa Emerging Men's squad for their six-match tour of Namibia. Later the same month, he was named in Northerns' squad, ahead of the 2021–22 cricket season in South Africa.
