= Abdoellah Steenkamp =

South African cricket umpire (born 1974)

Personal information
- Born: 24 October 1974 (age 52); Cape Town, South Africa

Umpiring information
- WODIs umpired: 1 (2023)
- WT20Is umpired: 1 (2023)
- Source: Cricinfo, 24 December 2023

Abdoellah Steenkamp (born 24 October 1974) is a South African cricket umpire. He has stood in matches in the Sunfoil 3-Day Cup tournament. He is part of Cricket South Africa's umpire panel for first-class matches.
