= Mitchell Van Buuren =

South African cricketer (born 1998)

Personal information
- Born: 21 January 1998 (age 28); Johannesburg, Gauteng, South Africa
- Source: Cricinfo, 9 November 2017

Mitchell Van Buuren (born 21 January 1998) is a South African cricketer. He made his first-class debut for Northerns in the 2017–18 Sunfoil 3-Day Cup on 9 November 2017. He made his List A debut for Northerns in the 2017–18 CSA Provincial One-Day Challenge on 7 January 2018.

In September 2018, he was named in Northerns' squad for the 2018 Africa T20 Cup. He made his Twenty20 debut for Northerns in the 2018 Africa T20 Cup on 15 September 2018. He was the leading run-scorer for Gauteng in the 2018–19 CSA Provincial One-Day Challenge, with 371 runs in five matches.

In September 2019, he was named in Gauteng's squad for the 2019–20 CSA Provincial T20 Cup. In April 2021, he was named in Gauteng's squad, ahead of the 2021–22 cricket season in South Africa.

In 2026, Van Buuren was retained by Sunrisers Eastern Cape for the 2026–27 SA20 season.
