= Arno Jacobs =

South African cricketer (born 1977)

Personal information
- Born: 13 March 1977 (age 49); Potchefstroom, Transvaal, South Africa
- Role: Umpire

Umpiring information
- T20Is umpired: 8 (2024–2026)
- WODIs umpired: 9 (2017–2023)
- WT20Is umpired: 7 (2023–2025)
- Source: ESPNcricinfo, 21 March 2023

Arno Jacobs (born 13 March 1977 in Potchefstroom) is a South African former first-class cricketer previously playing for the Warriors and current umpire. A left-handed batsman, he made over 4000 first class runs and has a highest score of 197. He is not related to South African domestic cricketer Davey Jacobs.

The 30-year-old, who can bowl right arm off-break and right arm medium, has a first class average of 38.04 with the bat and an average of 125 with the ball.

In his career, he has played for Scotland, Eastern Province, North West, Warriors, Western Transvaal, Middleton C.C. and Leicestershire C.C.C.

Controversy arose in the 2007 season when playing as the professional for Middleton in the Central Lancashire League, he was allowed to play for Scotland in the Friends Provident Trophy. Impressed by his form, Leicestershire C.C.C. approached both Middleton C.C. and Scotland Cricket for them to release him from his contracts and to allow Jacobs to play for Leicestershire full-time. Scotland Cricket released a statement that they were the ones who released him from the contract allowing him to play for Leicestershire, when in fact it was Middleton C.C. who had released him.

In 2017 he was selected to be an umpire for the South African 2017–18 first-class cricket season. He is part of Cricket South Africa's umpire panel for first-class matches.

== See also ==
- List of Twenty20 International cricket umpires
