= Gideon Peters =

South African cricketer (born 2000)

Personal information
- Full name: Gideon George Peters
- Born: 6 August 1999 (age 27); Pretoria, Gauteng, South Africa
- Batting: Right-handed
- Bowling: Right-arm fast
- Role: Bowler

Domestic team information
- Years: Team
- 2018/19–2023/24: North West
- 2019/20–2020/21: Northerns

Career statistics
Competition	FC	LA	T20
Matches	22	16	18
Runs scored	1819	2	16
Batting average	3.50	1.00	-
100s/50s	0/0	0/0	0/0
Top score	14	14	7
Balls bowled	2,779	694	470
Wickets	58	21	25
Bowling average	31.36	30.28	18.80
5 wickets in innings	1	0	0
10 wickets in match	0	0	0
Best bowling	5/48	4/55	3/23
Catches/stumpings	10/–	4/–	3/–
- Source: ESPNcricinfo, 06 February 2025

Gideon George Peters (born 6 August 1999) is a South African cricketer. He made his Twenty20 debut for Northerns in the 2019–20 CSA Provincial T20 Cup on 13 September 2019. In April 2021, he was named in Border's squad, ahead of the 2021–22 cricket season in South Africa.

== International career ==
In February 2025, Peters was named in the national squad for the Tri-Series in Pakistan.
