= Eastern Province cricket team =

Cricket team

Eastern Province cricket team was the former team that represented the Eastern Province in domestic first-class cricket in South Africa, alongside one-day matches. Eastern Province played first-class cricket from 1893–94 to 2004–05, when the team was merged with neighbouring team Border to form the entirely professional franchise the Warriors.

From 2004 to 2005 the former provincial teams, such as Eastern Province, were allocated two CSA Provincial Competitions that they could participate in: the CSA 3-Day Cup and the CSA One-Day Cup. Although given first-class status, these competitions were to be only semi-professional and no longer represented the top level of domestic cricket in South Africa.

In 2020, domestic cricket in South Africa was restructured and the six former franchise teams were dropped. In its place was a return to the more traditional two-division league format, with a total of fifteen professional teams competing, and the semi-professional provincial cricket being subsumed (effectively becoming Division 2) . These teams are more structured around a province when compared to the previous broad franchises. The Eastern Province name could have been resurrected during this time, however Eastern Province Cricket decided to maintain the brand recognition from the franchise era, with the new team continuing to be called the Warriors.

== Current squad Warriors ==
Squad for 2026/27 Season. Players in bold have played international cricket.

Name	Nationality	Birth date	Batting style	Bowling style	Notes
Batters
Matthew de Villiers	South Africa	21 November 2000 (age 25)	Right-handed	Right-arm seam	
**Jordan Hermann**	South Africa	4 December 2001 (age 24)	Left-handed	Right-arm orthodox spin	Player of National Interest
JP King	South Africa	26 August 2003 (age 22)	Right-handed	Right-arm orthodox spin	
Sibonelo Makhanya	South Africa	7 March 1996 (age 30)	Right-handed	Right-arm seam	
Muhammad Manack	South Africa	6 June 2002 (age 24)	Right-handed	Right-arm orthodox spin	
Andile Mokgakane	South Africa	25 December 1999 (age 26)	Right-handed	Right-arm seam	
Wicket-keepers
**Matthew Breetzke**	South Africa	3 November 1998 (age 27)	Right-handed		National Contract
Jean du Plessis	South Africa	24 November 1998 (age 27)	Right-handed	Right-arm seam	
Modiri Litheko	South Africa	2 June 2000 (age 26)	Right-handed		
**Tristan Stubbs**	South Africa	14 August 2000 (age 26)	Right-handed	Right-arm orthodox spin	National Contract
All-Rounders
Thomas Kaber	South Africa	14 June 1992 (age 34)	Right-handed	Left-arm wrist spin	
**Patrick Kruger**	South Africa	3 February 1995 (age 31)	Right-handed	Right-arm seam	
Jordan Morris	South Africa	1 March 1999 (age 27)	Right-handed	Right-arm seam	
**Senuran Muthusamy**	South Africa	22 February 1994 (age 32)	Left-handed	Left-arm orthodox spin	National Contract
Seamer
Wesley Bedja	South Africa		Right-handed	Right-arm seam	
Matthew Boast	South Africa	4 February 2003 (age 23)	Left-handed	Right-arm seam	
Tladi Bokako	South Africa	4 February 1993 (age 33)	Left-handed	Right-arm seam	High-performance Contract
Ethan Frosler	South Africa	8 September 2002 (age 23)	Right-handed	Right-arm seam	High-performance Contract
**Beuran Hendricks**	South Africa	8 June 1990 (age 36)	Left-handed	Left-arm seam	
CJ King	South Africa	24 July 2004 (age 22)	Right-handed	Right-arm seam	High-performance Contract
Kerwin Mungroo	South Africa	31 July 1994 (age 32)	Right-handed	Right-arm seam	
**Duanne Olivier**	South Africa	9 May 1992 (age 34)	Right-handed	Right-arm seam	
Gideon Peters	South Africa	6 August 1999 (age 27)	Right-handed	Right-arm seam	
Jason Raubenheimer	South Africa	4 January 1999 (age 27)	Right-handed	Right-arm orthodox spin	High-performance Contract

== Honours ==
- Currie Cup (2) – 1988–89, 1991–92; shared (1) – 1989–90
- (Benson & Hedges) Standard Bank Cup (2) – 1989–90, 1991–92
- Gillette/Nissan Cup (4) – 1971–72, 1975–76, 1986–87, 1989–90

== Venues ==
Venues have included:

- St George's Park (a.k.a. Axess DSl oval), Port Elizabeth (1889–present)
- Union Ground, St George's Park, Port Elizabeth (occasional venue 1952–1986)
- Rhodes University Great Field, Grahamstown (two games 1973–1978)
- Kemsley Park, Port Elizabeth (occasional venue Jan 1980 – Dec 1996)
- Rhodes University Prospect Field, Grahamstown (occasional venue Dec 1980 – Sept 1993)
- Uitenhage Cricket Club A Ground, Uitenhage (Dec 1981 – Feb 1989)
- Nelson Mandela Metropolitan University No 1 Oval, Port Elizabeth (occasional venue Dec 1982 – Feb 1999)
- Standard Cricket Club Ground, Cradock (two matches 1985–1991)

== See also ==
- List of Eastern Province representative cricketers

== Sources ==
- South African Cricket Annual – various editions
- Wisden Cricketers' Almanack – various editions
