= Patrick Kruger =

South African cricketer (born 1995)

Personal information
- Full name: Patrick Earl Kruger
- Born: 3 February 1995 (age 31); Kimberley, South Africa
- Batting: Right-handed
- Bowling: Right-arm medium
- Role: All-rounder

International information
- National side: South Africa
- T20I debut (cap 105): 26 May 2024 v West Indies
- Last T20I: 25 August 2024 v West Indies

Domestic team information
- Years: Team
- 2013–2015: Griqualand West
- 2016–2021: Knights
- 2015–2016: Northern Cape
- 2028/19: Paarl Rocks
- 2021–2023: Free State
- 2023–present: Easterns
- 2024: Sunrisers Eastern Cape
- Source: Cricinfo, 4 September 2015

Patrick Kruger (born 3 February 1995) is a South African cricketer. He was included in the Griqualand West cricket team squad for the 2015 Africa T20 Cup.

In May 2017, Kruger was named Africa T20 Cup Player of the Tournament at Cricket South Africa's annual awards. In August 2017, he was named in Jo'burg Giants' squad for the first season of the T20 Global League. However, in October 2017, Cricket South Africa initially postponed the tournament until November 2018, with it being cancelled soon after.

In January 2018, Kruger scored his first century in List A cricket, batting for Knights against Cape Cobras in the 2017–18 Momentum One Day Cup. In September 2018, he was named in Northern Cape's squad for the 2018 Africa T20 Cup. He was the leading run-scorer for Northern Cape in the tournament, with 200 runs in four matches.

In October 2018, Kruger was named in Paarl Rocks' squad for the first edition of the Mzansi Super League T20 tournament. In September 2019, he was named in Northern Cape's squad for the 2019–20 CSA Provincial T20 Cup. In April 2021, he was named in Free State's squad, ahead of the 2021–22 cricket season in South Africa.
