= 2016–17 Sunfoil 3-Day Cup =

Cricket tournament

- Dates: 6 October 2016 – 9 April 2017
- Administrator(s): Cricket South Africa
- Cricket format: First-class
- Tournament format(s): Round-robin
- Champions: (South Africa) Northerns (South Africa) Free State
- Participants: 14
- Most runs: Pieter Malan (1,069)
- Most wickets: Migael Pretorius (42)

The 2016–17 Sunfoil 3-Day Cup was a first-class cricket competition that took place in South Africa from 6 October 2016 to 9 April 2017. The competition was played between the thirteen South African provincial teams and Namibia. Unlike its counterpart, the Sunfoil Series, the matches were three days in length instead of four. The tournament was played in parallel with the 2016–17 CSA Provincial One-Day Challenge, a List A competition which featured the same teams.

Northerns finished top of Pool A and Free State finished top of Pool B, with both teams progressing to the final of the competition. The final ended as a draw, with both teams sharing the title.

== Points table ==
Pool A

Team	Pld	W	L	D	Pts
(South Africa) Northerns	10	6	0	4	140.06
(South Africa) North West	10	6	0	4	130.48
(South Africa) Western Province	10	5	1	4	126.86
(South Africa) Northern Cape	10	2	5	3	80.56
(South Africa) Border	10	2	3	5	80.50
(South Africa) South Western Districts	10	1	8	1	61.98
(South Africa) KwaZulu-Natal	10	1	5	4	61.44

Team qualified for the final

Pool B

Team	Pld	W	L	D	Pts
(South Africa) Free State	10	6	2	2	132.78
(South Africa) Gauteng	10	3	1	6	108.44
(South Africa) KwaZulu-Natal Inland	10	3	1	6	102.00
(South Africa) Easterns	10	3	1	6	98.01
(South Africa) Eastern Province	10	2	4	4	81.76
(South Africa) Boland	10	1	5	4	71.92
Namibia	10	1	6	3	56.82

Team qualified for the final

== Group stage ==
=== Pool A ===
6–8 October 2016
Scorecard

KwaZulu-Natal Inland (South Africa)	v	(South Africa) North West
269 (70.5 overs); Cameron Delport 147 (134); Andre Malan 2/15 (6 overs)		208 (47.2 overs); Marques Ackerman 112 (94); Calvin Savage 5/62 (17.2 overs)
359/7d (78 overs); Senuran Muthusamy 145 (224); Armandt Erasmus 3/75 (18 overs)		280/3 (66 overs); Isaac Dikgale 101* (211); Senuran Muthusamy 2/63 (12 overs)

Match drawn
Senwes Park, Potchefstroom
Umpires: Phillip Vosloo and Jeff Wolhuter

- KwaZulu-Natal won the toss and elected to bat.
- Okuhle Cele and Dudu Zondo (KwaZulu-Natal) both made their first-class debuts.

13–15 October 2016
Scorecard

Western Province (South Africa)	v	(South Africa) South Western Districts
306/7d (90 overs); Sybrand Engelbrecht 98 (176); Gurshwin Rabie 3/62 (18 overs)		128 (39.3 overs); Hanno Kotze 42 (91); George Linde 5/10 (8.3 overs)
152 (50 overs); George Linde 52 (77); Nkululeko Serame 4/25 (12 overs)		234 (58.3 overs); Nkululeko Serame 64 (98); Dayyaan Galiem 5/60 (16.3 overs)

Western Province won by 96 runs
Recreation Ground, Oudtshoorn
Umpires: Clifford Isaacs and Abdoellah Steenkamp

- South Western Districts won the toss and elected to field.
- Mthobeli Bangindawo and Murray Commins (South Western Districts) both made their first-class debuts.

20–22 October 2016
Scorecard

North West (South Africa)	v	(South Africa) Border
154 (50 overs); Marques Ackerman 40 (55); Phaphama Fojela 5/32 (15 overs)		320/5d (77 overs); Gionne Koopman 90 (140); Johannes Diseko 2/64 (16 overs)
383/9 (84.3 overs); Brady Barends 105* (121); Phaphama Fojela 4/98 (22 overs)

Match drawn
Buffalo Park, East London
Umpires: Laurance Willemse and Jeff Wolhuter

- Border won the toss and elected to field.

20–22 October 2016
Scorecard

Northern Cape (South Africa)	v	(South Africa) KwaZulu-Natal
179 (70.3 overs); Zakir Kathrada 90* (157); Okuhle Cele 3/8 (7.2 overs)		145 (59 overs); Calvin Savage 78 (130); Corné Dry 4/50 (19 overs)
293/9d (84.4 overs); Patrick Kruger 86 (121); Prenelan Subrayen 4/78 (18.4 overs)		102 (44 overs); Cameron Delport 28 (33); Werner Coetsee 5/11 (12 overs)

Northern Cape won by 225 runs
Chatsworth Stadium, Durban
Umpires: Clifford Isaacs and Arno Jacobs

- Northern Cape won the toss and elected to bat.
- Blayde Capell and Gareth Wissing (KwaZulu-Natal) and Cloete Buitendag (Northern Cape) all made their first-class debuts.

28–30 October 2016
Scorecard

KwaZulu-Natal (South Africa)	v	(South Africa) Northerns
197 (53.5 overs); Cameron Delport 61 (66); Grant Thomson 4/24 (13 overs)		340 (88.5 overs); Cobus Pienaar 102 (168); Rabian Engelbrecht 3/100 (22 overs)
160 (42.5 overs); Jason Oakes 46 (59); Eldred Hawken 6/29 (11.5 overs)		19/0 (3.4 overs); Lerato Kgoatle 13* (12)

Northerns won by 10 wickets
Centurion Park, Centurion
Umpires: B. Lawrence and Brad White

- Northerns won the toss and elected to field.
- Sithabiso Zungu (KwaZulu-Natal) and Tony de Zorzi (Northerns) both made their first-class debuts.

10–12 November 2016
Scorecard

Border (South Africa)	v	(South Africa) Northerns
120/7 (41.4 overs); Jerry Nqolo 35 (73); Eldred Hawken 4/24 (15 overs)

Match drawn
Buffalo Park, East London
Umpires: Clifford Isaacs and Bongani Ntshebe

- Northerns won the toss and elected to field.
- Rain prevented any play from taking place on days 2 and 3.
- Phumzile Majaja (Border) made his first-class debut.

17–19 November 2016
Scorecard

KwaZulu-Natal (South Africa)	v	(South Africa) South Western Districts
74 (36.2 overs); Mishkal Ramsaroop 23 (58); Ottniel Baartman 7/27 (15.2 overs)		107 (49.3 overs); Brendon Louw 24 (65); Tyron Koen 3/20 (9 overs)
281 (98.5 overs); Senuran Muthusamy 142 (254); Ottniel Baartman 7/68 (23.5 overs)		251/4 (83.5 overs); Andrea Agathangelou 125* (205); Tyron Koen 2/47 (17.5 overs)

South Western Districts won by 6 wickets
Recreation Ground, Oudtshoorn
Umpires: Thomas Mokorosi and Irvin van Kerwel

- South Western Districts won the toss and elected to field.
- Bruce Kerr and Tyron Koen (KwaZulu-Natal) both made their first-class debuts.

1–3 December 2016
Scorecard

Border (South Africa)	v	(South Africa) Northern Cape
289 (85.1 overs); Gionne Koopman 67 (157); Mbulelo Budaza 3/44 (13 overs)		69 (31.4 overs); Jacques Snyman 38 (73); Thandolwethu Mnyaka 5/17 (9.4 overs)
227 (55.4 overs); Jerry Nqolo 99 (101); Warren Bell 4/32 (9.2 overs)		233 (66.3 overs); Corné Dry 86 (98); Phaphama Fojela 4/40 (17 overs)

Border won by 214 runs
Buffalo Park, East London
Umpires: Rudi Birkenstock and Bongani Ntshebe

- Northern Cape won the toss and elected to field.
- Jacques Snyman (Northern Cape) made his first-class debut.

15–17 December 2016
Scorecard

Western Province (South Africa)	v	(South Africa) North West
354/7d (88 overs); Sybrand Engelbrecht 166 (203); Brady Barends 3/53 (19 overs)		219 (80.1 overs); Brady Barends 48 (114); Matthew Kleinveldt 3/49 (21 overs)
215/1d (56.4 overs); Pieter Malan 117* (185); Eden Links 1/72 (17 overs)		354/3 (73.5 overs); Janneman Malan 135 (158); Mpilo Njoloza 1/59 (10 overs)

North West won by 7 wickets
Newlands, Cape Town
Umpires: Clifford Isaacs and Thomas Mokorosi

- North West won the toss and elected to field.
- Jovuan van Wyngaardt (North West) made his first-class debut.

15–17 December 2016
Scorecard

Border (South Africa)	v	(South Africa) KwaZulu-Natal
216 (70.5 overs); Mkhululi Calana 106 (186); Calvin Savage 4/39 (16.5 overs)		130 (47.1 overs); Sibonelo Makhanya 37 (78); Phumzile Majaja 4/21 (4.1 overs)
266/4d (76 overs); Martin Walters 83 (161); Smangaliso Nhlebela 2/59 (16 overs)		357/4 (73.3 overs); Senuran Muthusamy 87 (143); Jerry Nqolo 2/31 (5 overs)

KwaZulu-Natal won by 6 wickets
Kingsmead, Durban
Umpires: Siphelele Gasa and Lubabalo Gcuma

- KwaZulu-Natal won the toss and elected to field.

6–8 January 2017
Scorecard

Western Province (South Africa)	v	(South Africa) Northerns
372/7 (96 overs); Matthew Kleinveldt 111* (268); Grant Thomson 3/61 (14 overs)

Match drawn
Centurion Park, Centurion
Umpires: Arno Jacobs and Gerrie Pienaar

- Northerns won the toss and elected to field.
- Neo Mlumbi (Western Province) made his first-class debut.

12–14 January 2017
Scorecard

South Western Districts (South Africa)	v	(South Africa) Northerns
246 (86.1 overs); Brendon Louw 106 (196); Migael Pretorius 3/26 (12 overs)		303 (97.4 overs); Tony de Zorzi 103 (135); Siyabonga Booi 3/62 (20 overs)
131 (49.4 overs); Niel Hornbuckle 35 (66); Migael Pretorius 4/37 (16 overs)		75/1 (19.2 overs); Victor Mahlangu 37* (62); Nkululeko Serame 1/23 (6 overs)

Northerns won by 9 wickets
Recreation Ground, Oudtshoorn
Umpires: Gladman Gaseba and Stephen Harris

- Northerns won the toss and elected to field.
- Bongani Mahlangu (Northerns) and Grant Esau (South Western Districts) both made their first-class debuts.

19–21 January 2017
Scorecard

Western Province (South Africa)	v	(South Africa) KwaZulu-Natal
279 (74.1 overs); Derek Mitchell 70 (86); Craig Alexander 4/55 (18.1 overs)		124 (42.3 overs); Khalipha Cele 52 (118); Mpilo Njoloza 4/35 (9 overs)
42/5 (15 overs); Pieter Malan 22* (29); Eathan Bosch 4/11 (5 overs)		349 (119.2 overs) (f/o); Cody Chetty 141 (301); Dayyaan Galiem 5/67 (23 overs)

Match drawn
Kingsmead, Durban
Umpires: Lubabalo Gcuma and Jurie Sadler

- Western Province won the toss and elected to bat.

9–11 February 2017
Scorecard

Northerns (South Africa)	v	(South Africa) North West
470/6d (104 overs); Qaasim Adams 203 (260); Eden Links 2/77 (18 overs)		327 (82.1 overs); Wihan Lubbe 101 (138); Eldred Hawken 5/72 (21.1 overs)
274/7d (64 overs); Thomas Kaber 70 (79); Brady Barends 4/53 (15 overs)		204/3 (37.3 overs); Andre Malan 100* (88); Migael Pretorius 1/31 (8 overs)

Match drawn
Senwes Park, Potchefstroom
Umpires: Hassen Dawood and B Lawrence

- North West won the toss and elected to field.
- Stefan Klopper and Tumi Koto (Northerns) both made their first-class debuts.

9–11 February 2017
Scorecard

South Western Districts (South Africa)	v	(South Africa) Northern Cape
132 (47.4 overs); Murray Commins 40 (101); Warren Bell 4/43 (18 overs)		265 (82.3 overs); Jacques Snyman 133 (234); Glenton Stuurman 3/35 (20 overs)
251 (90.5 overs); Murray Commins 78 (153); Corné Dry 5/63 (19.5 overs)		119/2 (30.3 overs); Letlotlo Sesele 46 (83); Glenton Stuurman 1/15 (7 overs)

Northern Cape won by 8 wickets
Recreation Ground, Oudtshoorn
Umpires: Lester Leendertz and Thomas Mokorosi

- Northern Cape won the toss and elected to field.

2–4 March 2017
Scorecard

Border (South Africa)	v	(South Africa) Western Province
220 (63.2 overs); Phaphama Fojela 46* (24); Michael Cohen 3/29 (12.2 overs)		286 (81.3 overs); Pieter Malan 61 (104); Phaphama Fojela 4/57 (19.3 overs)
226 (78.2 overs); Mkhululi Calana 60 (117); Mpilo Njoloza 3/43 (16 overs)		161/5 (34.1 overs); Kyle Verreynne 79* (77); Sinovuyo Ntuntwana 2/44 (9 overs)

Western Province won by 5 wickets
Newlands, Cape Town
Umpires: Thomas Mokorosi and Dennis Smith

- Western Province won the toss and elected to field.
- Michael Cohen (Western Province) made his first-class debut.

2–4 March 2017
Scorecard

North West (South Africa)	v	(South Africa) Northern Cape
322 (87.2 overs); Marques Ackerman 122 (136); Warren Bell 5/61 (17 overs)		97 (31.2 overs); Corné Dry 36 (34); Jovuan van Wyngaardt 4/17 (10 overs)
115/4 (23.5 overs); Janneman Malan 31 (32); Kagiso Mohale 2/22 (6 overs)		339 (93.5 overs) (f/o); Jacques Snyman 70 (107); Jovuan van Wyngaardt 4/100 (26.5 overs)

North West won by 6 wickets
Diamond Oval, Kimberley
Umpires: Siphelele Gasa and Marlon Jansen

- Northern Cape won the toss and elected to field.

9–11 March 2017
Scorecard

South Western Districts (South Africa)	v	(South Africa) Border
111 (41.3 overs); Andrea Agathangelou 25 (27); Phaphama Fojela 5/31 (12 overs)		250 (72.1 overs); Somila Seyibokwe 53 (132); Nkululeko Serame 3/48 (9.1 overs)
224 (56 overs); Niel Hornbuckle 69 (63); Phaphama Fojela 3/39 (12 overs)		86/3 (21.1 overs); Marco Marais 29 (32); Glenton Stuurman 2/24 (6 overs)

Border won by 7 wickets
Buffalo Park, East London
Umpires: Bongani Ntshebe and Irvin van Kerwel

- Border won the toss and elected to field.
- Bradley Williams (Border) made his first-class debut.

23–25 March 2017
Scorecard

South Western Districts (South Africa)	v	(South Africa) North West
226 (52.2 overs); Hanno Kotze 68 (59); Kagiso Rapulana 2/24 (6 overs)		272 (83 overs); Janneman Malan 106 (131); Nkululeko Serame 6/73 (23 overs)
172 (51.3 overs); Todd Walker 41 (71); Johannes Diseko 4/22 (12 overs)		130/7 (37.5 overs); Kagiso Rapulana 35 (35); Glenton Stuurman 6/37 (16 overs)

North West won by 3 wickets
Senwes Park, Potchefstroom
Umpires: Ryan Hendricks and Marlon Jansen

- North West won the toss and elected to field.
- Jean-Pierre le Roux (North West) and Todd Walker (South Western Districts) both made their first-class debuts.

23–25 March 2017
Scorecard

Northern Cape (South Africa)	v	(South Africa) Northerns
134 (46.1 overs); Jacques Snyman 46 (62); Migael Pretorius 6/38 (16 overs)		292 (73.4 overs); Tony de Zorzi 121* (169); Kagiso Mohale 5/64 (20.4 overs)
195 (67 overs); Zakir Kathrada 44 (65); Alfred Mothoa 3/24 (10 overs)		39/1 (10.1 overs); Tony de Zorzi 22* (17); Aidan Brooker 1/10 (4 overs)

Northerns won by 9 wickets
LC de Villiers Oval, Pretoria
Umpires: Abdoellah Steenkamp and Phillip Vosloo

- Northern Cape won the toss and elected to bat.

=== Pool B ===
6–8 October 2016
Scorecard

Free State (South Africa)	v	(South Africa) Easterns
308 (81.4 overs); Driaan Bruwer 65 (124); Clayton August 4/39 (16 overs)		344 (90.1 overs); Ernest Kemm 126 (240); Lwandiswa Zuma 3/64 (21 overs)
337/6d (73 overs); Patrick Botha 145 (144); Kofi Apea-Adu 2/36 (6 overs)		201/4 (36 overs); Ernest Kemm 81 (92); Tshepo Ntuli 2/28 (4 overs)

Match drawn
Willowmoore Park, Benoni
Umpires: Gladman Gaseba and Stephen Harris

- Free State won the toss and elected to bat.
- Thabo Motaung (Easterns) and Raynard van Tonder (Free State) both made their first-class debuts.

13–15 October 2016
Scorecard

Gauteng (South Africa)	v	(South Africa) KwaZulu-Natal Inland
150 (47.2 overs); Grant Roelofsen 51 (89); Graham Hume 5/31 (15 overs)		151 (59.5 overs); Tshepang Dithole 36 (93); Matt McGillivray 5/44 (20 overs)
340/4d (90 overs); Devon Conway 129 (251); Kerwin Mungroo 2/53 (13 overs)		230 (61.2 overs); Kushen Kishun 68 (119); Lazarus Mokoena 5/46 (16.2 overs)

Gauteng won by 109 runs
New Wanderers Stadium, Johannesburg
Umpires: Rudi Birkenstock and Arno Jacobs

- KwaZulu-Natal Inland won the toss and elected to field.
- Grant Roelofsen (Gauteng) made his first-class debut.

20–22 October 2016
Scorecard

KwaZulu-Natal Inland (South Africa)	v	(South Africa) Boland
208 (84.1 overs); Divan van Wyk 79 (116); Kyle Simmonds 6/55 (33.1 overs)		338/7d (111 overs); Keegan Petersen 94 (198); Attie Maposa 5/65 (26 overs)
173/5 (67 overs); Luke Schlemmer 50* (114); Jean Bredenkamp 2/12 (9 overs)

Match drawn
City Oval, Pietermaritzburg
Umpires: Murray Brown and Siphelele Gasa

- KwaZulu-Natal Inland won the toss and elected to bat.
- Luke Schlemmer (KwaZulu-Natal Inland) and Brandon Glover (Boland) both made their first-class debuts.

20–22 October 2016
Scorecard

Gauteng (South Africa)	v	(South Africa) Eastern Province
372/7d (106 overs); Yaseen Valli 150* (337); Tladi Bokako 2/50 (20 overs)		248 (77 overs); Kelly Smuts 43 (48); Eddie Leie 5/67 (20.5 overs)
71/1 (22 overs); Karabo Mogotsi 31 (47); Kelly Smuts 1/7 (7 overs)

Match drawn
New Wanderers Stadium, Johannesburg
Umpires: Adrian Holdstock and Jurie Sadler

- Eastern Province won the toss and elected to field.
- Junaid Dawood (Eastern Province) made his first-class debut.

10–12 November 2016
Scorecard

Easterns (South Africa)	v	(South Africa) Eastern Province
342/8d (92 overs); Wesley Coulentianos 107 (153); Ngazibini Sigwili 3/66 (21 overs)		161 (60.1 overs); David White 42 (110); Clayton August 3/35 (17 overs)
		42/1 (11 overs) (f/o); Edward Moore 25* (38); Matthew Arnold 1/18 (6 overs)

Match drawn
St George's Park, Port Elizabeth
Umpires: Gladman Gaseba and Stephen Harris

- Easterns won the toss and elected to bat.

24–26 November 2016
Scorecard

Namibia	v	(South Africa) KwaZulu-Natal Inland
198 (57.5 overs); Jan Frylinck 92 (135); Ruhan Pretorious 4/35 (14.5 overs)		402/9d (115.3 overs); Divan van Wyk 153 (245); Bernard Scholtz 3/64 (18.3 overs)
439/6 (105 overs); Gerhard Erasmus 192 (286); Kerwin Mungroo 4/89 (21 overs)

Match drawn
Sparta Recreational Club, Walvis Bay
Umpires: Wynand Louw and Jurie Sadler

- Namibia won the toss and elected to bat.

24–26 November 2016
Scorecard

Boland (South Africa)	v	(South Africa) Free State
92 (27.4 overs); Ferisco Adams 25 (25); Dillon du Preez 6/27 (9.4 overs)		376/6d (100 overs); Rudi Second 106* (163); Kyle Simmonds 3/77 (29 overs)
78 (39.2 overs); Mangaliso Mtiya 16 (14); Gino Vries 3/7 (8 overs)

Free State won by an innings and 206 runs
Boland Park, Paarl
Umpires: Clifford Isaacs and Irvin van Kerwel

- Free State won the toss and elected to field.
- Mangaliso Mtiya (Boland) made his first-class debut.

24–26 November 2016
Scorecard

Gauteng (South Africa)	v	(South Africa) Easterns
394/5d (98.2 overs); Yaseen Valli 182 (282); Kofi Apea-Adu 2/56 (13.2 overs)		159/6d (54.3 overs); Ernest Kemm 53 (149); Keith Dudgeon 3/34 (13 overs)

Match drawn
Willowmoore Park, Benoni
Umpires: Johan Cloete and Abdoellah Steenkamp

- Gauteng won the toss and elected to bat.

8–10 December 2016
Scorecard

KwaZulu-Natal Inland (South Africa)	v	(South Africa) Easterns
411/9d (106.2 overs); Lefa Mosena 113 (219); Clayton August 3/71 (23 overs)		177 (66.1 overs); Ruan Sadler 61 (105); Ruhan Pretorious 3/32 (9 overs)
		178/6 (58.2 overs) (f/o); Ruan Sadler 56 (63); Kyle Nipper 3/39 (13 overs)

Match drawn
City Oval, Pietermaritzburg
Umpires: Gladman Gaseba and B. Lawrence

- KwaZulu-Natal Inland won the toss and elected to bat.

8–10 December 2016
Scorecard

Free State (South Africa)	v	Namibia
375/5d (79 overs); Pite van Biljon 116 (135); Fritz Coetzee 3/59 (6 overs)		114 (46.4 overs); Bernard Scholtz 28 (43); Tshepo Ntuli 6/45 (11.3 overs)
		196 (49 overs) (f/o); Craig Williams 45 (70); Duanne Olivier 5/41 (13 overs)

Free State won by 65 runs
Mangaung Oval, Bloemfontein
Umpires: Siphelele Gasa and Ryan Hendricks

- Namibia won the toss and elected to field.
- Sean Whitehead (Free State) and Fritz Coetzee (Namibia) both made their first-class debuts.

15–17 December 2016
Scorecard

Boland (South Africa)	v	(South Africa) Eastern Province
246 (84.4 overs); Jean Bredenkamp 93 (169); Tladi Bokako 3/34 (17 overs)		373 (92.2 overs); Michael Price 116 (171); Ferisco Adams 2/78 (20 overs)
249 (90 overs); Isma-eel Gafieldien 64 (119); Tladi Bokako 5/50 (21 overs)		124/0 (18 overs); Edward Moore 76* (55)

Eastern Province won by 10 wickets
Pollock Field, Port Elizabeth
Umpires: Gladman Gaseba and Stephen Harris

- Boland won the toss and elected to bat.

15–17 December 2016
Scorecard

Gauteng (South Africa)	v	Namibia
331/2d (97 overs); Devon Conway 175* (268); Sarel Burger 1/43 (17 overs)		317 (98.2 overs); Craig Williams 86 (116); Keith Dudgeon 3/65 (19 overs)
222/2d (47 overs); Devon Conway 122* (130); Stephan Baard 1/38 (7 overs)		141 (37.3 overs); Bernard Scholtz 40* (68); Lazarus Mokoena 5/66 (12 overs)

Gauteng won by 95 runs
New Wanderers Stadium, Johannesburg
Umpires: Faizel Samsoodien and Abdoellah Steenkamp

- Namibia won the toss and elected to field.

12–14 January 2017
Scorecard

Namibia	v	(South Africa) Easterns
230 (87.2 overs); Jacques Fourie 63 (142); Clayton August 4/42 (18.2 overs)		334 (78.1 overs); Wesley Marshall 152 (139); Xander Pitchers 4/59 (16 overs)
165/9 (77 overs); Michau du Preez 57 (105); Matthew Arnold 3/39 (13 overs)

Match drawn
Wanderers Cricket Ground, Windhoek
Umpires: Andrew Louw and Jurie Sadler

- Namibia won the toss and elected to bat.
- Tumelo Simelane (Easterns) made his first-class debut.

12–14 January 2017
Scorecard

Boland (South Africa)	v	(South Africa) Gauteng
238 (93.5 overs); Fenito Mehl 80 (177); Sean Jamison 4/38 (18 overs)		374 (112.1 overs); Shaylen Pillay 118 (184); Niel Botha 6/108 (40 overs)
139/1 (64 overs); Cebo Tshiki 66* (188); Lazarus Mokoena 1/25 (11 overs)

Match drawn
Boland Park, Paarl
Umpires: Johan Cloete and Thomas Mokorosi

- Boland won the toss and elected to bat.
- Niel Botha and Leighton Swarts (Boland) both made their first-class debuts.

19–21 January 2017
Scorecard

Gauteng (South Africa)	v	(South Africa) Free State
270 (69 overs); Shaylen Pillay 74 (129); Johan van Dyk 5/81 (16 overs)		447 (111 overs); Michael Erlank 172 (258); Keith Dudgeon 3/92 (21 overs)
269 (84 overs); Shaylen Pillay 108 (213); Lwandiswa Zuma 4/62 (15 overs)		93/2 (19.5 overs); Michael Erlank 52 (53); Lazarus Mokoena 1/17 (4 overs)

Free State won by 8 wickets
Mangaung Oval, Bloemfontein
Umpires: Ryan Hendricks and Lester Leendertz

- Gauteng won the toss and elected to bat.

19–21 January 2017
Scorecard

Namibia	v	(South Africa) Eastern Province
271 (106.3 overs); Lo-handre Louwrens 78 (112); Junaid Dawood 5/89 (34 overs)		272 (81 overs); Gihahn Cloete 57 (61); Danie van Schoor 6/86 (34 overs)
163 (65.4 overs); Justin Baard 50 (95); Junaid Dawood 8/70 (26.4 overs)		164/2 (42.5 overs); Lesiba Ngoepe 72* (82); Tangeni Lungameni 1/33 (4.5 overs)

Eastern Province won by 8 wickets
Wanderers Cricket Ground, Windhoek
Umpires: Hassen Dawood and Andrew Louw

- Namibia won the toss and elected to bat.

9–11 February 2017
Scorecard

Eastern Province (South Africa)	v	(South Africa) Free State
169 (63.5 overs); Mathew Christensen 57 (102); Dillon du Preez 3/18 (15 overs)		242 (85.5 overs); Leus du Plooy 77 (191); Ngazibini Sigwili 4/57 (18.5 overs)
107 (55.3 overs); Matthew Breetzke 36 (86); Sammy Mofokeng 3/15 (8 overs)		35/2 (7.4 overs); Andries Gous 13* (17); Ngazibini Sigwili 1/13 (4 overs)

Free State won by 8 wickets
Mangaung Oval, Bloemfontein
Umpires: Ryan Hendricks and Jack Morton

- Eastern Province won the toss and elected to bat.
- Luvuyo Adam, Matthew Breetzke, Henco Vorstman (Eastern Province) and Jonathan Draai (Free State) all made their first-class debuts.

23–25 February 2017
Scorecard

KwaZulu-Natal Inland (South Africa)	v	(South Africa) Eastern Province
270 (80 overs); Ruhan Pretorious 151 (196); Luvuyo Adam 3/33 (15 overs)		196 (65 overs); Edward Moore 81 (145); Craig Alexander 4/43 (14 overs)
206/9d (71 overs); Kurtlyn Mannikam 57* (114); Luvuyo Adam 5/68 (24 overs)		242 (74.2 overs); Solo Nqweni 48 (89); Kurtlyn Mannikam 3/20 (3 overs)

KwaZulu-Natal Inland won by 38 runs
St George's Park, Port Elizabeth
Umpires: Arno Jacobs and Abdoellah Steenkamp

- Eastern Province won the toss and elected to field.

9–11 March 2017
Scorecard

Free State (South Africa)	v	(South Africa) KwaZulu-Natal Inland
160 (56.4 overs); Michael Erlank 66 (151); Graham Hume 2/20 (14 overs)		187 (47.3 overs); Ruhan Pretorius 51 (89); Sammy Mofokeng 5/49 (11.3 overs)
138 (36.1 overs); Andries Gous 33 (49); Gareth Dukes 3/12 (5.1 overs)		114/4 (38.1 overs); Ruhan Pretorius 52* (54); Tshepo Ntuli 3/15 (8 overs)

KwaZulu-Natal Inland won by 6 wickets
City Oval, Pietermaritzburg
Umpires: Jurie Sadler and Phillip Vosloo

- Free State won the toss and elected to bat.
- Beyers Swanepoel (Free State) made his first-class debut.

16–18 March 2017
Scorecard

Boland (South Africa)	v	(South Africa) Easterns
24/8d (13.4 overs); Godfrey Stevens 8 (15); Clayton August 4/17 (6.4 overs)		196 (51.5 overs); Matthew Arnold 63 (71); Ferisco Adams 5/68 (19 overs)
206 (62.4 overs); Simon Khomari 52 (114); Clayton August 4/65 (15 overs)		38/1 (8 overs); Ferisco Adams 1/1 (3 overs)

Easterns won by 9 wickets
Willowmoore Park, Benoni
Umpires: Johan Cloete and Abdoellah Steenkamp

- Boland won the toss and elected to bat.

23–25 March 2017
Scorecard

Namibia	v	(South Africa) Boland
279 (82.4 overs); Lo-handre Louwrens 110 (155); Kyle Simmonds 5/45 (20 overs)		250 (79.2 overs); Ricardo Vasconcelos 70 (116); Danie van Schoor 3/46 (12.2 overs)
326/7d (89 overs); Craig Williams 152* (212); Ziyaad Abrahams 5/98 (22 overs)		288/7 (54 overs); Ferisco Adams 92 (104); Sarel Burger 2/41 (9 overs)

Match drawn
Boland Park, Paarl
Umpires: Clifford Isaacs and Jurie Sadler

- Boland won the toss and elected to field.

=== Cross Pool ===
6–8 October 2016
Scorecard

Western Province (South Africa)	v	Namibia
397/6d (119 overs); Pieter Malan 211* (350); Jan Frylinck 3/66 (22 overs)		125 (59.5 overs); Gerrie Snyman 42 (108); Dayyaan Galiem 3/27 (7 overs)
		200 (88.5 overs) (f/o); Stephan Baard 80 (202); Shaheen Khan 3/33 (13.5 overs)

Western Province won by an innings and 72 runs
Sparta Cricket Club Ground, Walvis Bay
Umpires: Jack Morton and Claude Thorburn

- Western Province won the toss and elected to bat.
- Karl Birkenstock and Colin Peake (Namibia); Dayyaan Galiem and Carlos Koyana (Western Province) all made their first-class debuts.

14–16 October 2016
Scorecard

Northerns (South Africa)	v	(South Africa) Eastern Province
282 (90.1 overs); Gihahn Cloete 135 (203); Lungi Ngidi 5/57 (19.1 overs)		336 (72.4 overs); Victor Mahlangu 68 (74); Tladi Bokako 5/75 (15.4 overs)
73 (26.5 overs); Gihahn Cloete 18 (48); Lungi Ngidi 4/25 (12 overs)		20/0 (4.1 overs); Victor Mahlangu 13* (10)

Northerns won by 10 wickets
Centurion Park, Centurion
Umpires: Siphelele Gasa and Jurie Sadler

- Northerns won the toss and elected to field.
- Migael Pretorius (Northerns) made his first-class debut.

27–29 October 2016
Scorecard

Boland (South Africa)	v	(South Africa) Western Province
282 (92.4 overs); Ferisco Adams 132 (212); Beuran Hendricks 3/47 (22 overs)		472/6d (123.5 overs); Pieter Malan 204* (391); Ziyaad Abrahams 2/83 (22 overs)
157 (76.5 overs); David Bedingham 42 (114); George Linde 3/23 (19 overs)

Western Province won by an innings and 33 runs
Boland Park, Paarl
Umpires: Murray Brown and Abdoellah Steenkamp

- Boland won the toss and elected to bat.
- Ziyaad Abrahams and Charl Cyster (Boland) both made their first-class debuts.

27–29 October 2016
Scorecard

Border (South Africa)	v	(South Africa) Free State
442/7d (104.1 overs); Gionne Koopman 130 (202); Gino Vries 2/43 (15 overs)		363/9d (106.1 overs); Leus du Plooy 103* (207); Clayton Bosch 3/65 (20 overs)
183/5d (46 overs); Gionne Koopman 65 (99); Tshepo Ntuli 3/55 (13 overs)

Match drawn
Mangaung Oval, Bloemfontein
Umpires: Johan Cloete and Marlon Jansen

- Free State won the toss and elected to field.

27–29 October 2016
Scorecard

Easterns (South Africa)	v	(South Africa) South Western Districts
378 (111 overs); Wesley Coulentianos 119 (146); Mthobeli Bangindawo 3/36 (14 overs)		209 (55.5 overs); Andrea Agathangelou 109 (128); David Mogotlane 3/23 (7.5 overs)
237/9 (29.3 overs); Ernest Kemm 89 (68); Siyabonga Booi 2/75 (10 overs)		405/5d (100 overs) (f/o); Andrea Agathangelou 199* (264); Kofi Apea-Adu 2/54 (18 overs)

Easterns won by 1 wicket
Willowmoore Park, Benoni
Umpires: Gerrie Pienaar and Jurie Sadler

- Easterns won the toss and elected to bat.
- David Mogotlane (Easterns) made his first-class debut.

3–5 November 2016
Scorecard

Northern Cape (South Africa)	v	(South Africa) Western Province
370 (99.2 overs); Werner Coetsee 88 (148); Mthiwekhaya Nabe 4/54 (16 overs)		295/5d (74 overs); Kyle Verreynne 107* (191); Corné Dry 2/41 (18 overs)
246/2d (40 overs); Letlotlo Sesele 83* (82); Matthew Kleinveldt 2/87 (16 overs)		198/6 (50.5 overs); Zubayr Hamza 65 (96); Kagiso Mohale 4/50 (12 overs)

Match drawn
Western Province Cricket Club, Cape Town
Umpires: Murray Brown and Abdoellah Steenkamp

- Western Province won the toss and elected to field.

3–5 November 2016
Scorecard

KwaZulu-Natal Inland (South Africa)	v	(South Africa) South Western Districts
317/9d (102.5 overs); Gareth Dukes 102 (151); Glenton Stuurman 3/69 (23 overs)		350 (95.4 overs); Andrea Agathangelou 115* (176); Ruhan Pretorius 3/37 (12 overs)
67/3 (22 overs); Luke Schlemmer 25 (30); Glenton Stuurman 2/17 (11 overs)

Match drawn
City Oval, Pietermaritzburg
Umpires: Lubabalo Gcuma and Thomas Mokorosi

- South Western Districts won the toss and elected to field.
- Jongile Kilani (South Western Districts) made his first-class debut.

10–12 November 2016
Scorecard

Boland (South Africa)	v	(South Africa) Northern Cape
272 (86 overs); Isma-eel Gafieldien 99 (146); Desmond de Koker 4/66 (15 overs)		375/9d (77.1 overs); Aubrey Swanepoel 167 (148); Fenito Mehl 3/85 (9 overs)
310/3 (72 overs); David Bedingham 107* (97); Warren Bell 1/39 (12 overs)

Match drawn
Diamond Oval, Kimberley
Umpires: Ryan Hendricks and Marlon Jansen

- Boland won the toss and elected to bat.
- Isma-eel Gafieldien, Fenito Mehl and Ricardo Vasconcelos (Boland) all made their first-class debuts.

17–19 November 2016
Scorecard

North West (South Africa)	v	Namibia
421/6d (104 overs); Janneman Malan 174 (201); Sarel Burger 2/36 (18 overs)		167 (57.5 overs); Sarel Burger 54 (94); Eden Links 4/31 (17.5 overs)
		169 (69.2 overs) (f/o); Christopher Coombe 35 (89); Marques Ackerman 3/14 (5.2 overs)

North West won by an innings and 85 runs
Wanderers Cricket Ground, Windhoek
Umpires: Arno Jacobs and Claude Thorburn

- North West won the toss and elected to bat.
- Jacques Fourie (Namibia) and Tshepo Seroalo (North West) both made their first-class debuts.

1–3 December 2016
Scorecard

South Western Districts (South Africa)	v	(South Africa) Boland
318 (88.4 overs); Niel Hornbuckle 109 (136); Kyle Simmonds 3/108 (37.4 overs)		384 (122.1 overs); Ferisco Adams 146 (205); Nelson Setimani 4/55 (18.1 overs)
150 (66.4 overs); Murray Commins 55 (121); Kyle Simmonds 6/49 (28.4 overs)		85/3 (25 overs); Isma-eel Gafieldien 41* (79); Brendon Louw 2/33 (12 overs)

Boland won by 7 wickets
Boland Park, Paarl
Umpires: Murray Brown and Marlon Jansen

- South Western Districts won the toss and elected to bat.
- Jean du Plessis (South Western Districts) made his first-class debut.

15–17 December 2016
Scorecard

Northern Cape (South Africa)	v	(South Africa) KwaZulu-Natal Inland
162 (47.1 overs); Aubrey Swanepoel 44 (72); Craig Alexander 3/43 (13 overs)		312 (84.1 overs); Divan van Wyk 90 (99); Patrick Kruger 5/35 (16 overs)
117 (25 overs); Jacques Snyman 57 (55); Ruhan Pretorious 4/23 (6 overs)

KwaZulu-Natal Inland won by an innings and 33 runs
Diamond Oval, Kimberley
Umpires: Rudi Birkenstock and B. Lawrence

- Northern Cape won the toss and elected to field

5–7 January 2017
Scorecard

Eastern Province (South Africa)	v	(South Africa) Border
144 (54.4 overs); Ngazibini Sigwili 30 (70); Ayabulela Gqamane 5/21 (16 overs)		352/9d (81 overs); Christiaan Jonker 79 (100); Anrich Nortje 4/98 (24 overs)
194/3 (54 overs); Gihahn Cloete 97 (156); Darryl Brown 2/31 (13 overs)

Match drawn
St George's Park, Port Elizabeth
Umpires: Abdoellah Steenkamp and Laurance Willemse

- Border won the toss and elected to field.
- Lutho Sipamla (Eastern Province) made his first-class debut.

12–14 January 2017
Scorecard

KwaZulu-Natal (South Africa)	v	(South Africa) Eastern Province
374/5d (119 overs); Prenelan Subrayen 134* (186); Tladi Bokako 2/43 (15 overs)		229 (98.2 overs); Tian Koekemoer 59 (192); Okuhle Cele 3/44 (13.2 overs)
66/3 (16 overs); Sibonelo Makhanya 20 (16); Anrich Nortje 2/44 (8 overs)

Match drawn
Chatsworth Stadium, Durban
Umpires: Murray Brown and Arno Jacobs

- Eastern Province won the toss and elected to field.
- Dumisani Magala (Eastern Province) and Eathan Bosch (KwaZulu-Natal) both made their first-class debuts.

19–21 January 2017
Scorecard

North West (South Africa)	v	(South Africa) Boland
298 (85.5 overs); Marques Ackerman 68 (52); Zakhele Qwabe 5/74 (24 overs)		313 (96.4 overs); Jean Bredenkamp 80 (147); Andre Malan 4/30 (13.4 overs)
290/2d (67 overs); Andre Malan 103* (148); Lizaad Williams 1/54 (10 overs)		193 (44 overs); Simon Khomari 67 (68); Brady Barends 5/33 (10 overs)

North West won by 82 runs
Senwes Park, Potchefstroom
Umpires: Murray Brown and Thomas Mokorosi

- Boland won the toss and elected to field.

19–21 January 2017
Scorecard

Easterns (South Africa)	v	(South Africa) Northerns
289 (92.1 overs); Ernest Kemm 90 (277); Eldred Hawken 4/64 (19.1 overs)		409/9d (103.4 overs); Shaun von Berg 110* (136); David Jacobs 3/55 (20 overs)
184/4 (41 overs); Wesley Coulentianos 89* (116); Migael Pretorius 1/36 (12 overs)

Match drawn
Willowmoore Park, Benoni
Umpires: Arno Jacobs and Faizel Samsoodien

- Easterns won the toss and elected to bat.

26–28 January 2017
Scorecard

Free State (South Africa)	v	(South Africa) Northern Cape
236 (73 overs); Patrick Botha 91 (101); Kagiso Mohale 4/44 (13 overs)		109 (32.5 overs); Aubrey Swanepoel 21 (51); Lwandiswa Zuma 6/50 (11.5 overs)
277/8d (79 overs); Patrick Botha 93 (119); Jacques Snyman 4/86 (32 overs)		165 (48.4 overs); Jacques Snyman 47 (39); Lwandiswa Zuma 5/53 (13.4 overs)

Free State won by 239 runs
Diamond Oval, Kimberley
Umpires: B. Lawrence and Jack Morton

- Northern Cape won the toss and elected to field.

9–11 February 2017
Scorecard

Easterns (South Africa)	v	(South Africa) Western Province
288 (80 overs); Sizwe Masondo 107 (160); Mthiwekhaya Nabe 2/30 (13 overs)		207 (55.3 overs); Kyle Verreynne 49 (63); Matthew Arnold 5/60 (16.3 overs)
238 (69 overs); Wesley Marshall 86 (91); George Linde 6/101 (31 overs)		323/4 (70.3 overs); Pieter Malan 133* (212); Matthew Arnold 2/55 (16 overs)

Western Province won by 6 wickets
Newlands, Cape Town
Umpires: Murray Brown and Siphelele Gasa

- Easterns won the toss and elected to bat.

9–11 February 2017
Scorecard

KwaZulu-Natal (South Africa)	v	(South Africa) KwaZulu-Natal Inland
269/8d (95.5 overs); Mishkal Ramsaroop 68 (174); Kyle Nipper 3/66 (26.5 overs)		373/7 (95 overs); Lefa Mosena 86 (131); Smangaliso Nhlebela 6/150 (38 overs)

Match drawn
City Oval, Pietermaritzburg
Umpires: Clifford Isaacs and Arno Jacobs

- KwaZulu-Natal Inland won the toss and elected to field.
- Zakariya Paruk (KwaZulu-Natal) made his first-class debut.

16–18 February 2017
Scorecard

Easterns (South Africa)	v	(South Africa) Border
177 (54.3 overs); Wesley Coulentianos 86 (125); Somila Seyibokwe 2/4 (3.3 overs)		141 (55.1 overs); Marco Marais 40 (136); Matthew Arnold 5/41 (13.1 overs)
183 (54.2 overs); Sizwe Masondo 70 (83); Phaphama Fojela 3/18 (10.2 overs)		135 (48.1 overs); Martin Walters 25 (45); Thandolwethu Mnyaka 25 (45); Tumelo Simelane 5/22 (12. 1 overs)

Easterns won by 84 runs
Buffalo Park, East London
Umpires: Thomas Mokorosi and Laurance Willemse

- Border won the toss and elected to field.
- Lance Humphrey (Easterns) made his first-class debut.

16–18 February 2017
Scorecard

KwaZulu-Natal (South Africa)	v	(South Africa) Free State
69 (34.4 overs); Khalipha Cele 27 (61); Dillon du Preez 5/18 (12.4 overs)		116 (45.5 overs); Raynard van Tonder 27 (65); Smangaliso Nhlebela 7/33 (10.5 overs)
223 (77.4 overs); Senuran Muthusamy 61 (120); Sammy Mofokeng 5/39 (15 overs)		180/4 (56.3 overs); Andries Gous 96* (135); Khalipha Cele 1/4 (3 overs)

Free State won by 6 wickets
Chatsworth Stadium, Durban
Umpires: Johan Cloete and Abdoellah Steenkamp

- Free State won the toss and elected to field.
- Nealan van Heerden (Free State) made his first-class debut.

23–25 February 2017
Scorecard

Gauteng (South Africa)	v	(South Africa) North West
363/3d (100.2 overs); Yassar Cook 105* (129); Ayavuya Myoli 1/38 (15 overs)		438/6 (91 overs); Andre Malan 177* (214); Nandre Burger 2/75 (17 overs)

Match drawn
Senwes Park, Potchefstroom
Umpires: Jurie Sadler and Phillip Vosloo

- North West won the toss and elected to field.
- Chad Classen (Gauteng) made his first-class debut.

2–4 March 2017
Scorecard

Namibia	v	(South Africa) South Western Districts
44 (16.4 overs); Craig Williams 32* (33); Glenton Stuurman 7/12 (8.4 overs)		88 (43.5 overs); Brendon Louw 17 (28); Sarel Burger 5/13 (12.5 overs)
212 (99.2 overs); Craig Williams 74 (155); Glenton Stuurman 3/39 (22.2 overs)		98 (40 overs); Andrea Agathangelou 55* (84); Bernard Scholtz 4/36 (12 overs)

Namibia won by 70 runs
Recreation Ground, Oudtshoorn
Umpires: Faizel Samsoodien and Abdoellah Steenkamp

- South Western Districts won the toss and elected to field.

9–11 March 2017
Scorecard

Gauteng (South Africa)	v	(South Africa) KwaZulu-Natal
370 (94.2 overs); Ryan Rickelton 191 (288); Zakariya Paruk 4/55 (18.2 overs)		147 (53 overs); Tyron Koen 50 (64); Nandre Burger 4/49 (13 overs)
		194 (60.4 overs) (f/o); Jason Oakes 48 (75); Sean Jamison 5/59 (19 overs)

Gauteng won by an innings and 29 runs
New Wanderers Stadium, Johannesburg
Umpires: Thomas Mokorosi and Faizel Samsoodien

- KwaZulu-Natal won the toss and elected to field.
- Joel Veeran (KwaZulu-Natal) made his first-class debut.

9–11 March 2017
Scorecard

Namibia	v	(South Africa) Northerns
236 (68.3 overs); Jan Frylinck 51 (33); Alfred Mothoa 4/54 (18 overs)		491 (98.5 overs); Grant Thomson 221 (293); Mika Mutumbe 4/85 (12.5 overs)
172 (56.2 overs); Jacques Fourie 39 (81); Stefan Klopper 4/44 (11.2 overs)

Northerns won by an innings and 83 runs
Centurion Park, Centurion
Umpires: Jack Morton and Abdoellah Steenkamp

- Northerns won the toss and elected to field.

9–11 March 2017
Scorecard

Eastern Province (South Africa)	v	(South Africa) North West
258 (88.2 overs); Edward Moore 81 (133); Brady Barends 4/49 (18 overs)		279 (83 overs); Richardt Frenz 141 (219); Luvuyo Adam 6/87 (33 overs)
220 (92.3 overs); Matthew Breetzke 47 (124); Johannes Diseko 5/63 (35.3 overs)		200/8 (42.1 overs); Kagiso Rapulana 79 (93); Lutho Sipamla 5/53 (12 overs)

North West won by 2 wickets
St George's Park, Port Elizabeth
Umpires: Gladman Gaseba and Lester Leendertz

- North West won the toss and elected to field.
- Kenan Smith (Eastern Province) made his first-class debut.

16–18 March 2017
Scorecard

Free State (South Africa)	v	(South Africa) Northerns
190 (71 overs); Andries Gous 72 (173); Alfred Mothoa 3/45 (16 overs)		332 (97.5 overs); Qaasim Adams 102 (146); Romano Terblanche 4/24 (10.5 overs)
100 (40.3 overs); Andries Gous 55* (96); Alfred Mothoa 3/14 (9 overs)

Northerns won by an innings and 42 runs
Mangaung Oval, Bloemfontein
Umpires: Siphelele Gasa and Phillip Vosloo

- Free State won the toss and elected to bat.

16–18 March 2017
Scorecard

Northern Cape (South Africa)	v	(South Africa) Gauteng
550/8d (112 overs); Jacques Snyman 109 (106); Nandre Burger 4/107 (28 overs)		487/8d (125.5 overs); Karabo Mogotsi 112* (201); Corné Dry 2/38 (16 overs)
124 (34.2 overs); Aidan Brooker 23* (48); Nandre Burger 5/38 (11.2 overs)		105/2 (18 overs); Devon Conway 50* (43); Kagiso Mohale 1/47 (8 overs)

Match drawn
Diamond Oval, Kimberley
Umpires: Marlon Jansen and Kevin Lawrence

- Northern Cape won the toss and elected to bat.

23–25 March 2017
Scorecard

Gauteng (South Africa)	v	(South Africa) Border
492/3d (122 overs); Devon Conway 205* (301); Marco Marais 1/59 (10 overs)		223 (77 overs); Kabelo Sekhukhune 44 (97); Sean Jamison 5/40 (17 overs)
81/1 (21 overs); Karabo Mogotsi 39* (53); Thandolwethu Mnyaka 1/22 (4 overs)

Match drawn
New Wanderers Stadium, Johannesburg
Umpires: Siphelele Gasa and Gerrie Pienaar

- Gauteng won the toss and elected to bat.
- Sithembile Langa (Border) made his first-class debut.

23–25 March 2017
Scorecard

Western Province (South Africa)	v	(South Africa) KwaZulu-Natal Inland
270 (75.1 overs); Kyle Verreynne 98 (122); Attie Maposa 4/53 (19.1 overs)		307 (86.3 overs); Mbasa Gqadushe 69 (85); Mthiwekhaya Nabe 4/48 (14 overs)
340/9 (90 overs); Pieter Malan 164* (244); Craig Alexander 3/41 (13 overs)

Match drawn
Newlands, Cape Town
Umpires: Hassen Dawood and Lester Leendertz

- KwaZulu-Natal Inland won the toss and elected to field.
- Jesse Christensen (Western Province) made his first-class debut.

== Final ==
6–9 April 2017
Scorecard

Free State (South Africa)	v	(South Africa) Northerns
285/9d (79 overs); Rudi Second 118* (164); Alfred Mothoa 4/39 (15 overs)		170 (52.1 overs); Tony de Zorzi 34 (81); Lwandiswa Zuma 5/46 (14 overs)
241/6d (56 overs); Michael Erlank 95 (143); Thomas Kaber 2/39 (6 overs)		198/5 (69 overs); Jonathan Vandiar 101* (195); Lwandiswa Zuma 2/6 (4 overs)

Match drawn
LC de Villiers Oval, Pretoria
Umpires: Abdoellah Steenkamp and Phillip Vosloo

- Free State won the toss and elected to bat.
- No play was possible on day 2 due to a wet outfield.
