= 2018–19 Momentum One Day Cup =

Cricket tournament

- Dates: 8 February – 31 March 2019
- Administrator(s): Cricket South Africa
- Cricket format: List A
- Tournament format(s): Double round-robin and playoffs
- Champions: Titans
- Participants: 6
- Matches: 33
- Most runs: Aiden Markram (542)
- Most wickets: Junior Dala (27)

The 2018–19 Momentum One Day Cup was a domestic one-day cricket championship that took place in South Africa. It was the 38th edition of the championship, with the tournament running from 8 February to 31 March 2019. Dolphins and Warriors were the defending champions, as the final of the previous competition was washed out, and the trophy shared between the two teams.

Cricket South Africa announced that the semi-finals and final of the competition would take place after the limited overs fixtures against Sri Lanka in March 2019, to help prepare the national side for the 2019 Cricket World Cup. Following the conclusion of the group stage fixtures, Titans, Dolphins, Warriors and the Cape Cobras had all progressed to the semi-finals.

Titans beat Cape Cobras in the first semi-final, with Junior Dala taking his career-best figures of 6/19 in the match. In the second semi-final, Dolphins beat Warriors by seven wickets, chasing down the target of 120 runs inside twenty overs. In the final, Titans beat Dolphins by 135 runs, with Aiden Markram scoring 127 runs.

== Points table ==
Pos	Team	Pld	W	L	NR	BP	Pts	NRR
1	Titans	10	6	4	0	4	28	0.949
2	Dolphins	10	5	4	1	1	23	0.011
3	Warriors	10	5	4	1	0	22	−0.510
4	Cape Cobras	10	5	5	0	0	20	−0.483
5	Knights	10	3	5	2	2	18	0.112
6	Lions	10	2	4	4	0	16	−0.078

Teams qualified for the finals

== Fixtures ==
=== Round-robin ===
8 February 2019
Scorecard

Cape Cobras; 276/6 (50 overs)	v	Warriors; 277/7 (49.5 overs)
Kyle Verreynne 84 (76); Lutho Sipamla 3/50 (8 overs)		Gihahn Cloete 111 (127); Jason Smith 3/46 (10 overs)

Warriors won by 3 wickets
Boland Park, Paarl
Umpires: Allahudien Paleker and Brad White

- Cape Cobras won the toss and elected to bat.

9 February 2019
Scorecard

Dolphins; 342/6 (50 overs)	v	Lions; 323/9 (50 overs)
Vaughn van Jaarsveld 124 (102); Wiaan Mulder 2/52 (10 overs)		Reeza Hendricks 130 (117); Imran Tahir 3/71 (10 overs)

Dolphins won by 19 runs
City Oval, Pietermaritzburg
Umpires: Bongani Jele and Adrian Holdstock
Player of the match: Vaughn van Jaarsveld (Dolphins)

- Lions won the toss and elected to field.

10 February 2019
Scorecard

Knights; 262/5 (50 overs)	v	Titans; 268/1 (38.4 overs)
Keegan Petersen 107* (139); Lungi Ngidi 2/35 (9 overs)		Tony de Zorzi 115* (124); Mbulelo Budaza 1/48 (7 overs)

Titans won by 9 wickets
Centurion Park, Centurion
Umpires: Johan Cloete and Shaun George
Player of the match: Tony de Zorzi (Titans)

- Titans won the toss and elected to field.

13 February 2019
Scorecard

Warriors; 76/3 (16.2 overs)	v	Lions
Yaseen Vallie 36 (36); Wiaan Mulder 2/4 (3.2 overs)

No result
New Wanderers Stadium, Johannesburg
Umpires: Arno Jacobs and Dennis Smith

- Lions won the toss and elected to field.
- Rain during Warriors' innings prevented any further play.

16 February 2019
Scorecard

Lions	v	Knights

Match abandoned
New Wanderers Stadium, Johannesburg
Umpires: Siphelele Gasa and Allahudien Paleker

- No toss.
- No play was possible due to rain.

17 February 2019
Scorecard

Dolphins; 308/7 (50 overs)	v	Titans; 296/8 (50 overs)
Andile Phehlukwayo 69 (61); Lungi Ngidi 4/47 (10 overs)		Tony de Zorzi 89 (101); Robbie Frylinck 4/53 (10 overs)

Dolphins won by 12 runs
Centurion Park, Centurion
Umpires: Clifford Isaacs and Murray Brown
Player of the match: Robbie Frylinck and Andile Phehlukwayo (Dolphins)

- Titans won the toss and elected to field.

19 February 2019
Scorecard

Knights; 282/6 (50 overs)	v	Cape Cobras; 286/7 (49.3 overs)
Andries Gous 60 (79); Akhona Mnyaka 2/61 (8 overs)		Kyle Verreynne 114* (119); Marchant de Lange 3/45 (8 overs)

Cape Cobras won by 3 wickets
Mangaung Oval, Bloemfontein
Umpires: Bongani Jele and Stephen Harris
Player of the match: Kyle Verreynne (Cape Cobras)

- Knights won the toss and elected to bat.

22 February 2019
Scorecard

Dolphins; 276/7 (50 overs)	v	Cape Cobras; 254 (49 overs)
Khaya Zondo 93 (115); Dane Paterson 3/40 (10 overs)		George Linde 63 (48); Andile Phehlukwayo 4/56 (10 overs)

Dolphins won by 22 runs
Boland Park, Paarl
Umpires: Lubabalo Gcuma and Abdoellah Steenkamp
Player of the match: Khaya Zondo (Dolphins)

- Cape Cobras won the toss and elected to field.

22 February 2019
Scorecard

Warriors; 195 (47 overs)	v	Knights; 184 (46.1 overs)
Matthew Breetzke 39 (60); Jacques Snyman 4/36 (10 overs)		Keegan Petersen 88 (144); Andrew Birch 3/28 (10 overs)

Warriors won by 14 runs (D/L method)
Diamond Oval, Kimberley
Umpires: Ryan Hendricks and Philip Vosloo
Player of the match: Andrew Birch (Warriors)

- Knights won the toss and elected to field.
- The match was reduced to 47 overs per side due to rain.

24 February 2019
Scorecard

Cape Cobras; 298/5 (50 overs)	v	Lions; 277 (49.4 overs)
Zubayr Hamza 88* (97); Nono Pongolo 2/34 (6 overs)		Dwaine Pretorius 74 (42); George Linde 3/39 (10 overs)

Cape Cobras won by 21 runs
Recreation Ground, Oudtshoorn
Umpires: Clifford Isaacs and Lubabalo Gcuma
Player of the match: George Linde (Cape Cobras)

- Cape Cobras won the toss and elected to bat.

26 February 2019
Scorecard

Dolphins; 244 (49.2 overs)	v	Warriors; 152/2 (28 overs)
Andile Phehlukwayo 68 (72); Sisanda Magala 5/59 (9.2 overs)		Gihahn Cloete 55 (76); Imran Tahir 1/22 (7 overs)

Warriors won by 8 wickets (D/L method)
Kingsmead, Durban
Umpires: Dennis Smith and Stephen Harris
Player of the match: Sisanda Magala (Warriors)

- Dolphins won the toss and elected to bat.
- Warriors were set a revised target of 152 runs from 31 overs due to rain.

27 February 2019
Scorecard

Titans; 309/7 (50 overs)	v	Lions; 311/2 (47 overs)
Dean Elgar 137 (121); Bjorn Fortuin 1/43 (6 overs)		Temba Bavuma 117* (108); Farhaan Behardien 1/35 (6 overs)

Lions won by 8 wickets
Senwes Park, Potchefstroom
Umpires: Adrian Holdstock and Brad White
Player of the match: Temba Bavuma (Lions)

- Lions won the toss and elected to field.

1 March 2019
Scorecard

Warriors; 309/9 (50 overs)	v	Lions; 276/9 (41 overs)
Sinethemba Qeshile 121* (105); Aaron Phangiso 3/48 (10 overs)		Dominic Hendricks 116* (103); Andrew Birch 3/50 (8 overs)

Warriors won by 7 runs (D/L method)
Buffalo Park, East London
Umpires: Lubabalo Gcuma and Brad White
Player of the match: Sinethemba Qeshile (Warriors)

- Warriors won the toss and elected to bat.
- Lions were set a revised target of 284 runs from 41 overs.

1 March 2019
Scorecard

Titans; 320/6 (50 overs)	v	Cape Cobras; 237 (40.5 overs)
Aiden Markram 169 (129); Rory Kleinveldt 3/36 (10 overs)		Janneman Malan 71 (77); Aiden Markram 2/24 (5 overs)

Titans won by 83 runs
Newlands, Cape Town
Umpires: Greg Davidson and Dennis Smith
Player of the match: Aiden Markram (Titans)

- Cape Cobras won the toss and elected to field.
- Aiden Markram and Farhaan Behardien (Titans) scored 272 runs for the sixth wicket, a record in List A cricket.

2 March 2019
Scorecard

Knights; 254/9 (50 overs)	v	Dolphins; 139/3 (27 overs)
Rudi Second 74 (76); Robbie Frylinck 3/42 (10 overs)		Sarel Erwee 59 (65); Marchant de Lange 3/35 (10 overs)

Dolphins won by 22 runs (D/L method)
Kingsmead, Durban
Umpires: Johan Cloete and Stephen Harris
Player of the match: Sarel Erwee (Dolphins)

- Dolphins won the toss and elected to field.

3 March 2019
Scorecard

Titans; 369/5 (50 overs)	v	Warriors; 314 (47.1 overs)
Aiden Markram 139 (127); Lutho Sipamla 3/40 (10 overs)		Sinethemba Qeshile 88 (62); Chris Morris 3/44 (9 overs)

Titans won by 55 runs
St George's Park, Port Elizabeth
Umpires: Greg Davidson and Murray Brown
Player of the match: Aiden Markram (Titans)

- Titans won the toss and elected to bat.

7 March 2019
Scorecard

Cape Cobras; 281/9 (50 overs)	v	Lions; 278/9 (50 overs)
Pieter Malan 102 (127); Bjorn Fortuin 2/46 (10 overs)		Dominic Hendricks 107 (118); Akhona Mnyaka 3/49 (8 overs)

Cape Cobras won by 3 runs
New Wanderers Stadium, Johannesburg
Umpires: Greg Davidson and Allahudien Paleker
Player of the match: Akhona Mnyaka (Cape Cobras)

- Lions won the toss and elected to field.

8 March 2019
Scorecard

Warriors; 132/4 (21 overs)	v	Titans; 185/8 (20.2 overs)
Matthew Breetzke 42 (42); Tshepo Moreki 2/17 (2 overs)		Aiden Markram 85 (43); Lutho Sipamla 2/27 (4 overs)

Titans won by 2 wickets (D/L method)
Willowmoore Park, Benoni
Umpires: Stephen Harris and Brad White
Player of the match: Junior Dala (Titans)

- Warriors won the toss and elected to bat.

9 March 2019
Scorecard

Dolphins; 218/6 (28 overs)	v	Cape Cobras; 220/2 (26 overs)
Sarel Erwee 116* (82); Rory Kleinveldt 2/41 (6 overs)		Janneman Malan 115* (83); Kerwin Mungroo 1/35 (5 overs)

Cape Cobras won by 8 wickets
City Oval, Pietermaritzburg
Umpires: Philip Vosloo and Lubabalo Gcuma
Player of the match: Janneman Malan (Cape Cobras)

- Cape Cobras won the toss and elected to field.
- The match was reduced to 28 overs per side due to rain.

9 March 2019
Scorecard

Lions; 22/1 (9.3 overs)	v	Knights
Dominic Hendricks 13* (33); Marchant de Lange 1/7 (5 overs)

No result
Mangaung Oval, Bloemfontein
Umpires: Greg Davidson and Johan Cloete

- Knights won the toss and elected to field.
- Rain during Lions' innings prevented any further play.

13 March 2019
Scorecard

Cape Cobras; 151 (37.2 overs)	v	Titans; 155/0 (22.1 overs)
Zubayr Hamza 30 (36); Chris Morris 4/23 (8 overs)		Diego Rosier 92* (62)

Titans won by 10 wickets
Centurion Park, Centurion
Umpires: Greg Davidson and Dennis Smith
Player of the match: Diego Rosier (Titans)

- Titans won the toss and elected to field.

15 March 2019
Scorecard

Warriors; 121 (26.3 overs)	v	Knights; 122/5 (29.3 overs)
Marco Marais 42 (36); Marchant de Lange 3/18 (6.3 overs)		Rudi Second 71* (70); Sisanda Magala 2/26 (5 overs)

Knights won by 5 wickets
Buffalo Park, East London
Umpires: Allahudien Paleker and Brad White
Player of the match: Rudi Second (Knights)

- Knights won the toss and elected to field.

15 March 2019
Scorecard

Titans; 300/9 (50 overs)	v	Dolphins; 230 (48.1 overs)
Heino Kuhn 107 (98); Senuran Muthusamy 3/55 (10 overs)		Sibonelo Makhanya 55 (60); Junior Dala 5/32 (10 overs)

Titans won by 70 runs
Kingsmead, Durban
Umpires: Thomas Mokorosi and Stephen Harris
Player of the match: Heino Kuhn (Titans)

- Dolphins won the toss and elected to field.

17 March 2019
Scorecard

Knights; 208/5 (25 overs)	v	Dolphins; 150 (21.4 overs)
Patrick Kruger 79 (54); Senuran Muthusamy 2/35 (5 overs)		Sarel Erwee 38 (31); Shadley van Schalkwyk 5/25 (4.4 overs)

Knights won by 58 runs
Diamond Oval, Kimberley
Umpires: Johan Cloete and Murray Brown
Player of the match: Patrick Kruger (Knights)

- Dolphins won the toss and elected to field.

20 March 2019
Scorecard

Warriors; 223/9 (50 overs)	v	Dolphins; 229/1 (35.5 overs)
JJ Smuts 76 (99); Okuhle Cele 3/52 (10 overs)		Sarel Erwee 105* (103); Basheeru-Deen Walters 1/47 (10 overs)

Dolphins won by 9 wickets
St George's Park, Port Elizabeth
Umpires: Arno Jacobs and Dennis Smith
Player of the match: Sarel Erwee (Dolphins)

- Warriors won the toss and elected to bat.

21 March 2019
Scorecard

Knights; 186 (47.4 overs)	v	Cape Cobras; 187/3 (44.1 overs)
Rudi Second 49 (69); Rory Kleinveldt 5/22 (8.4 overs)		Zubayr Hamza 65* (84); Tshepo Ntuli 1/24 (5 overs)

Cape Cobras won by 7 wickets
Newlands, Cape Town

- Knights won the toss and elected to bat.

21 March 2019
Scorecard

Lions; 304/8 (50 overs)	v	Titans; 297/8 (50 overs)
Dominic Hendricks 93 (110); Junior Dala 4/54 (10 overs)		Jonathan Vandiar 111 (124); Wiaan Mulder 2/46 (9 overs)

Lions won by 7 runs
Willowmoore Park, Benoni
Umpires: Clifford Isaacs and Stephen Harris

- Lions won the toss and elected to bat.

23 March 2019
Scorecard

Cape Cobras; 269/5 (50 overs)	v	Warriors; 270/1 (44 overs)
Janneman Malan 88 (108); Basheeru-Deen Walters 2/50 (7 overs)		Matthew Breetzke 131* (129); Dane Piedt 1/47 (10 overs)

Warriors won by 9 wickets
St George's Park, Port Elizabeth
Umpires: Arno Jacobs and Siphelele Gasa
Player of the match: Matthew Breetzke (Warriors)

- Cape Cobras won the toss and elected to bat.

23 March 2019
Scorecard

Titans; 323/7 (50 overs)	v	Knights; 285/5 (39 overs)
Theunis de Bruyn 183 (142); Tshepo Ntuli 2/62 (10 overs)		Andries Gous 60* (41); Tshepo Moreki 1/65 (7 overs)

Knights won by 5 wickets (D/L method)
Mangaung Oval, Bloemfontein
Umpires: Stephen Harris and Abdoellah Steenkamp
Player of the match: Theunis de Bruyn (Titans)

- Titans won the toss and elected to bat.

23 March 2019
Scorecard

Lions; 330/6 (50 overs)	v	Dolphins; 39/1 (9.2 overs)
Ryan Rickelton 126 (119); Okuhle Cele 4/79 (9 overs)		Marques Ackerman 16* (20); Bjorn Fortuin 1/21 (4 overs)

No result
Senwes Park, Potchefstroom
Umpires: Ryan Hendricks and Brad White

- Dolphins won the toss and elected to field.
- Rain during Dolphins' innings prevented any further play.

=== Finals ===
1st semi-final
27 March 2019
Scorecard

Cape Cobras; 187 (47.3 overs)	v	Titans; 188/5 (39.1 overs)
Kyle Verreynne 65 (98); Junior Dala 6/19 (8.3 overs)		Farhaan Behardien 75* (92); Rory Kleinveldt 3/49 (10 overs)

Titans won by 5 wickets
Centurion Park, Centurion
Umpires: Allahudien Paleker and Shaun George
Player of the match: Junior Dala (Titans)

- Titans won the toss and elected to field.

2nd semi-final
28 March 2019
Scorecard

Warriors; 119 (34.3 overs)	v	Dolphins; 123/3 (19.1 overs)
Lesiba Ngoepe 34 (58); Keshav Maharaj 4/36 (10 overs)		Vaughn van Jaarsveld 53 (53); Sisanda Magala 1/32 (4 overs)

Dolphins won by 7 wickets
Kingsmead, Durban
Umpires: Bongani Jele and Adrian Holdstock
Player of the match: Keshav Maharaj (Dolphins)

- Dolphins won the toss and elected to field.

Final
31 March 2019
Scorecard

Titans; 356/5 (50 overs)	v	Dolphins; 221 (39.4 overs)
Aiden Markram 127 (88); Senuran Muthusamy 1/31 (4 overs)		Dane Vilas 59 (56); Dale Steyn 3/36 (8 overs)

Titans won by 135 runs
Centurion Park, Centurion
Umpires: Adrian Holdstock and Shaun George
Player of the match: Aiden Markram (Titans)

- Dolphins won the toss and elected to field.
