= List of Easterns representative cricketers =

This is a partial list of cricketers who have played first-class, List A cricket, or Twenty20 cricket for Eastern Transvaal and Easterns in South Africa. The team was renamed ahead of the 1995–96 season following the renaming of Transvaal province to Gauteng in 1994.

Eastern Transvaal made its senior debut in the List A Nissan Cup competition during the 1989–90 season. After two seasons it began competing in the first-class UCB Bowl competition, the second division of the Currie Cup. After being renamed, the team continued to compete at first-class and List A level. Easterns first played domestic Twenty20 cricket in 2011–12, the first season in which provincial Twenty20 competitions were played in South Africa.

This list includes the players who played first-class and List A cricket for Eastern Transvaal between 1989–90 and 1994–95, and those who played first-class, List A, and Twenty20 cricket for Easterns from 1995–96 to the present day. It does not include players who appeared only for franchise team Titans which was operated by the Easterns and Northerns Cricket Unions between 2003–04 and 2020–21. (Note: The players who played for the franchise team are listed at List of Titans cricketers.)

== A ==
- Siraag Abrahams
- Kofi Apea-Adu
- Matthew Arnold
- Clayton August

== B ==
- Rupert Bailey
- Kenny Benjamin
- Jean-Pierre Bloem
- Gulam Bodi
- Tumelo Bodibe
- Ant Botha
- Wikus Botha
- Derek Brand
- Rudi Bryson
- Thando Bula

== C ==
- Ryan Cartwright
- Lee Coetzee
- Tony Cottey
- Wesley Coulentianos
- Derek Crookes
- Daryll Cullinan

== D ==
- Junior Dala
- Siphamandla Dapo
- Pierre de Bruyn
- Zander de Bruyn
- Quinton de Kock
- Marchant de Lange
- Peter de Vaal

== E ==
- Armand Erasmus

== F ==
- Donovan Ferreira
- Johan Fourie
- Neil Fusedale

== G ==
- Justin Gamble
- Chad Grainger

== H ==
- Philip Hearle
- Israel Hlengani
- Lance Humphrey

== I ==
- Imran Tahir

== J ==
- David Jacobs
- Dylan Jennings

== K ==
- Ernest Kemm
- Sven Koenig

== M ==
- Xolani Mahlaba
- Imran Manack
- Wesley Marshall
- Nhlanhla Mashigo
- Sizwe Masondo
- Dyllan Matthews
- Ethy Mbhalati
- David Mogotlane
- Albie Morkel
- Morné Morkel
- Mangaliso Mosehle
- Brad Moses
- Tshepo Motaung
- Robert Mutch

== N ==
- André Nel
- Zwelo Ntsimbini

== P ==
- Cobus Pienaar
- Revelation Plaatjie
- Andrew Pollock
- Anthony Pollock
- Divan Posthumus

== R ==
- Glen Radford
- Wayne Radford
- Brendon Reddy
- Michael Rindel
- Danie Rossouw

== S ==
- Ruan Sadler
- Kabelo Sekhukhune
- Andre Seymore
- Shakeel Ahmed
- Tabraiz Shamsi
- Xolane Shongwe
- Malusi Siboto
- Tumelo Simelane
- Phil Simmons
- Sam Skeete
- Dennis Smith
- Jurie Snyman

== T ==
- Grant Thomson
- Geoffrey Toyana
- Musawenkosi Twala

== V ==
- Aldo van den Berg
- Johan van der Wath
- Hardus Viljoen
- Aron Visser

== W ==
- Brad White
- David Wiese

== Z ==
- Sizwe Zulu
- Sinenhlanhla Zwane
