= List of Warriors cricketers =

This is a list of cricketers who played for the South African franchise team Warriors between the 2003–04 season and 2020–21. It includes the players who appeared for the team in first-class, List A and Twenty20 competitions during the period in which the team was a franchise.

During 2003, Cricket South Africa changed the way in which top-class domestic cricket in the country was organised. This created six franchise teams at the top level of domestic competition, combining the existing provincial teams to create an elite competition. Warriors were formed by combining the two existing teams in the east of the Eastern Cape province, Eastern Province and Border. Initially the team competed in the 2003–04 CSA T20 Challenge, before the CSA 4-Day Domestic Series and CSA One-Day Cup also became franchise-only competitions the following season. For the first T20 Challenge competition the team competed under the name Eastern Cape before adopting the name Warriors from the start of the 2004–05 season. South Western Districts became part of the franchise when they were promoted to first-class status before the start of the 2006–07 season, before moving to be part of the Cape Cobras franchise in March 2015. (Note: South Western Districts is geographically part of the Western Cape, but had been an associate team linked to the Eastern Cape since the 2004 restructuring.)

During the period of franchise competitions, Eastern Province, Border, and South Western Districts continued to compete as separate cricket unions in the CSA 3-Day and One-Day Cups and CSA T20 competitions. The period of franchise competition lasted until the end of the 2020–21 season when Cricket South Africa reverted to a division based provincial competition, with all three teams competing separately from the start of the 2021–22 season. Many of the senior provincial unions which had been involved in franchise competitions retained the names of their franchises as marketing tools. Eastern Province, the senior team in the Warriors franchise, chose to do so and use the name Warriors to brand their top-level teams.

This list includes only the players who played for Warriors between 2003–04 and 2020–21, the period in which franchise cricket operated in South Africa. It includes players who appeared for teams named Eastern Cape in 2003–04, but not those who played only for Eastern Province, Border, or until 2015–16, South Western Districts in provincial competitions during the period, or those who played for Eastern Province only after the end of franchise competitions in 2020–21.

== A ==
- Kyle Abbott
- HD Ackerman
- Colin Ackermann
- Qaasim Adams

== B ==
- Ryan Bailey
- Warren Bell
- Bevan Bennett
- Andrew Birch
- Nicky Boje
- Tladi Bokako
- Clayton Bosch
- Johan Botha
- Mark Boucher
- Carl Bradfield
- Matthew Breetzke
- Darryl Brown
- Mark Bruyns

== C ==
- Deon Carolus
- Gihahn Cloete

== D ==
- Zander de Bruyn
- Jade de Klerk
- Shaun de Kock
- Burton de Wett
- Brad Dolley
- Corbyn Dolley
- Athenkosi Dyili

== F ==
- Clyde Fortuin

== G ==
- Laden Gamiet
- Murray Goodwin
- Ayabulela Gqamane

== H ==
- Simon Harmer
- Nantie Hayward
- Tyron Henderson

== I ==
- Colin Ingram

== J ==
- Arno Jacobs
- Davey Jacobs
- Marco Jansen
- Riaan Jeggels
- Christiaan Jonker

== K ==
- Thomas Kaber
- Jacques Kallis
- Craig Kieswetter
- Tian Koekemoer
- Gionne Koopman
- Brent Kops
- Justin Kreusch
- Garnett Kruger

== L ==
- Sithembele Langa
- Brendon Louw
- Wihan Lubbe

== M ==
- Adrian McLaren
- Sisanda Magala
- Dumisa Makalima
- Viyusa Makhaphela
- Lizo Makhosi
- Mncedisi Malika
- Marco Marais
- Dyllan Matthews
- Lundi Mbane
- Lyall Meyer
- Thandolwethu Mnyaka
- Edward Moore

== N ==
- Mthiwekhaya Nabe
- Mfuneko Ngam
- Lesiba Ngoepe
- Anrich Nortje
- Jerry Nqolo
- Solo Nqweni
- Makhaya Ntini
- Tshepo Ntuli
- Onke Nyaku

== O ==
- Mario Olivier

== P ==
- Wayne Parnell
- Samit Patel
- Robin Peterson
- Marcello Piedt
- Steven Pope
- Michael Price (cricketer)
- Ashwell Prince

== Q ==
- Sinethemba Qeshile

== R ==
- Gurshwin Rabie
- Murray Ranger
- Rowan Richards

== S ==
- Rudi Second
- Somila Seyibokwe
- Tabraiz Shamsi
- Ngazibini Sigwili
- Lutho Sipamla
- Michael Smith
- JJ Smuts
- Kelly Smuts
- Abongile Sodumo
- Pieter Strydom
- Tristan Stubbs
- Glenton Stuurman

== T ==
- Stefan Tait
- Rusty Theron
- Craig Thyssen
- Lonwabo Tsotsobe

== V ==
- Yaseen Vallie

== W ==
- Basheeru-Deen Walters
- Lee-Roy Walters
- Martin Walters
- David White
- Darryl Willemse
- Reece Williams

== Z ==
- Monde Zondeki
