= 2019 CSA T20 Challenge =

Cricket tournament

- Dates: 5 April – 5 May 2019
- Administrator: Cricket South Africa
- Cricket format: Twenty20
- Tournament format(s): Double round-robin and knockout
- Host: South Africa
- Champions: Lions (3rd title)
- Participants: 6
- Matches: 33
- Most runs: Theunis de Bruyn (348); Rassie van der Dussen (348)
- Most wickets: Bjorn Fortuin (15)

The 2018–19 CSA T20 Challenge was the sixteenth season of the CSA T20 Challenge, established by Cricket South Africa. It took place from 5 April to 5 May 2019. Titans were the defending champions.

In April 2019, Cricket South Africa announced that this would be the final edition of the T20 Challenge, due to austerity measures and a restructure of domestic cricket in the country. Rain played a factor during the tournament, with several matches ending in a no result or being abandoned, including all three matches scheduled to be played on Easter Monday.

Following the conclusion of the group stage matches, Lions, Warriors, Cape Cobras and Dolphins had all progressed to the semi-finals of the tournament. Lions and Dolphins played each other in the first semi-final, with Warriors and Cape Cobras playing each other in the second semi-final. In the first semi-final, Lions beat Dolphins by eight wickets to progress to the final of the tournament. They were joined in the final by Warriors, who beat Cape Cobras by 15 runs in their semi-final match. Lions won the tournament, beating Warriors by 11 runs in the final.

== Points table ==
Pos	Team	Pld	W	L	T	NR	BP	Pts	NRR
1	Lions	10	5	2	0	3	2	28	0.523
2	Warriors	10	4	2	0	4	1	25	0.363
3	Cape Cobras	10	5	4	0	1	1	23	−0.352
4	Dolphins	10	3	3	0	4	1	21	0.226
5	Titans	10	3	4	0	3	1	19	0.151
6	Knights	10	0	5	0	5	0	10	−0.869

- Top four teams advanced to the finals

== Fixtures ==
=== Round-robin ===
5 April 2019
Scorecard

Titans; 216/5 (20 overs)	v	Warriors; 60/0 (6 overs)
Theunis de Bruyn 74 (38); Lutho Sipamla 2/34 (4 overs)		Gihahn Cloete 46* (25)

Warriors won by 4 runs (D/L method)
Centurion Park, Centurion
Umpires: Stephen Harris and Shaun George

- Warriors won the toss and elected to field.

6 April 2019
Scorecard

Knights; 133/8 (20 overs)	v	Dolphins; 134/6 (18.3 overs)
Aubrey Swanepoel 31 (19); Prenelan Subrayen 3/15 (4 overs)		Marques Ackerman 44* (36); Shadley van Schalkwyk 2/23 (4 overs)

Dolphins won by 4 wickets
Kingsmead, Durban
Umpires: Allahudien Paleker and Adrian Holdstock

- Dolphins won the toss and elected to field.

7 April 2019
Scorecard

Cape Cobras; 169/8 (20 overs)	v	Lions; 164/8 (20 overs)
Vernon Philander 31 (17); Bjorn Fortuin 2/14 (4 overs)		Ryan Rickelton 69 (43); Dane Paterson 3/30 (4 overs)

Cape Cobras won by 5 runs
New Wanderers Stadium, Johannesburg
Umpires: Bongani Jele and Brad White

- Lions won the toss and elected to field.

9 April 2019
Scorecard

Knights	v	Warriors

Match abandoned
Diamond Oval, Kimberley
Umpires: Siphelele Gasa and Stephen Harris

- No toss.
- No play was possible due to rain.

10 April 2019
Scorecard

Lions; 159/5 (20 overs)	v	Dolphins; 141/9 (20 overs)
Wiaan Mulder 59* (34); Keshav Maharaj 1/16 (4 overs)		Morne van Wyk 44 (26); Bjorn Fortuin 2/14 (4 overs)

Lions won by 18 runs
Kingsmead, Durban
Umpires: Murray Brown and Brad White

- Dolphins won the toss and elected to field.

10 April 2019
Scorecard

Cape Cobras; 150/6 (20 overs)	v	Titans; 151/3 (15.4 overs)
Kyle Verreynne 44 (38); Shaun von Berg 1/18 (4 overs)		Henry Davids 57 (39); Vernon Philander 1/28 (3.4 overs)

Titans won by 7 wickets
Willowmoore Park, Benoni
Umpires: Johan Cloete and Adrian Holdstock

- Titans won the toss and elected to field.

12 April 2019
Scorecard

Lions; 150/7 (20 overs)	v	Knights; 110/9 (20 overs)
Ryan Rickelton 51 (41); Gerald Coetzee 2/30 (4 overs)		Raynard van Tonder 32 (26); Bjorn Fortuin 3/10 (4 overs)

Lions won by 40 runs
Senwes Park, Potchefstroom
Umpires: Dennis Smith and Bongani Jele

- Knights won the toss and elected to field.
- Gerald Coetzee (Knights) made his T20 debut.

12 April 2019
Scorecard

Titans	v	Dolphins

Match abandoned
Willowmoore Park, Benoni
Umpires: Allahudien Paleker and Lubabalo Gcuma

- No toss.
- No play was possible due to rain.

12 April 2019
Scorecard

Warriors; 151/8 (20 overs)	v	Cape Cobras; 152/3 (15.5 overs)
Gihahn Cloete 28 (23); Aviwe Mgijima 3/14 (2 overs)		Janneman Malan 103* (57); Thomas Kaber 1/19 (2 overs)

Cape Cobras won by 7 wickets
Boland Park, Paarl
Umpires: Arno Jacobs and Adrian Holdstock

- Cape Cobras won the toss and elected to field.

14 April 2019
Scorecard

Cape Cobras; 152/6 (20 overs)	v	Dolphins; 144/5 (20 overs)
Hashim Amla 32 (32); Robbie Frylinck 2/27 (4 overs)		Khaya Zondo 53* (49); Rory Kleinveldt 2/9 (4 overs)

Cape Cobras won by 8 runs
Newlands, Cape Town
Umpires: Arno Jacobs and Adrian Holdstock

- Dolphins won the toss and elected to field.

14 April 2019
Scorecard

Warriors; 155/5 (18.4 overs)	v	Lions
Marco Marais 82* (33); Aaron Phangiso 2/13 (4 overs)

No result
Buffalo Park, East London
Umpires: Bongani Jele and Brad White

- Lions won the toss and elected to field.
- Rain prevented any further play.

14 April 2019
Scorecard

Titans; 136/4 (17 overs)	v	Knights
Diego Rosier 57 (40); Ryan McLaren 2/22 (3 overs)

No result
Diamond Oval, Kimberley
Umpires: Johan Cloete and Stephen Harris

- Knights won the toss and elected to field.
- Rain prevented any further play.

16 April 2019
Scorecard

Cape Cobras; 150/5 (20 overs)	v	Knights; 145/7 (20 overs)
David Bedingham 50 (42); Ryan McLaren 2/30 (4 overs)		Patrick Kruger 57 (38); Tladi Bokako 2/20 (4 overs)

Cape Cobras won by 5 runs
Newlands, Cape Town
Umpires: Dennis Smith and Brad White

- Knights won the toss and elected to field.

17 April 2019
Scorecard

Dolphins	v	Warriors

No result
Kingsmead, Durban
Umpires: Bongani Jele and Clifford Isaacs

- Warriors won the toss and elected to field.
- No play was possible due to rain.

18 April 2019
Scorecard

Lions; 181/4 (20 overs)	v	Titans; 162/9 (20 overs)
Rassie van der Dussen 85 (47); Junior Dala 3/33 (4 overs)		Theunis de Bruyn 42 (28); Nono Pongolo 3/29 (4 overs)

Lions won by 19 runs
New Wanderers Stadium, Johannesburg
Umpires: Adrian Holdstock and Stephen Harris

- Titans won the toss and elected to field.

20 April 2019
Scorecard

Dolphins; 185/4 (20 overs)	v	Titans; 191/2 (18.5 overs)
Cody Chetty 56 (36); Gregory Mahlokwana 1/23 (3 overs)		Theunis de Bruyn 72* (32); Prenelan Subrayen 2/28 (4 overs)

Titans won by 8 wickets
City Oval, Pietermaritzburg
Umpires: Adrian Holdstock and Philip Vosloo

- Titans won the toss and elected to field.

20 April 2019
Scorecard

Warriors; 189 (19.5 overs)	v	Cape Cobras; 179/7 (20 overs)
Marco Marais 75 (36); Vernon Philander 5/23 (3.5 overs)		George Linde 42 (27); Lutho Sipamla 2/45 (4 overs)

Warriors won by 10 runs
St George's Park, Port Elizabeth
Umpires: Lubabalo Gcuma and Shaun George

- Cape Cobras won the toss and elected to field.

20 April 2019
Scorecard

Knights	v	Lions

Match abandoned
Diamond Oval, Kimberley
Umpires: Thomas Mokorosi and Bongani Jele

- No toss.
- No play was possible due to rain.

22 April 2019
Scorecard

Lions	v	Dolphins

Match abandoned
Senwes Park, Potchefstroom
Umpires: Arno Jacobs and Allahudien Paleker

- No toss.
- No play was possible due to rain.

22 April 2019
Scorecard

Warriors	v	Titans

Match abandoned
Buffalo Park, East London
Umpires: Shaun George and Abdoellah Steenkamp

- No toss.
- No play was possible due to rain.

22 April 2019
Scorecard

Knights	v	Cape Cobras

Match abandoned
Mangaung Oval, Bloemfontein
Umpires: Dennis Smith and Stephen Harris

- No toss.
- No play was possible due to rain.

24 April 2019
Scorecard

Titans; 182/3 (20 overs)	v	Cape Cobras; 183/7 (18.5 overs)
Tony de Zorzi 70 (47); Tladi Bokako 2/47 (4 overs)		Aviwe Mgijima 55* (30); Junior Dala 3/32 (3 overs)

Cape Cobras won by 3 wickets
Boland Park, Paarl
Umpires: Lubabalo Gcuma and Brad White

- Cape Cobras won the toss and elected to field.

24 April 2019
Scorecard

Knights	v	Dolphins

Match abandoned
Mangaung Oval, Bloemfontein
Umpires: Johan Cloete and Siphelele Gasa

- No toss.
- No play was possible due to rain.

24 April 2019
Scorecard

Lions; 144/6 (20 overs)	v	Warriors; 145/1 (14.3 overs)
Dwaine Pretorius 48* (27); Sithembile Langa 1/19 (3 overs)		Matthew Breetzke 72* (45); Bjorn Fortuin 1/27 (4 overs)

Warriors won by 9 wickets
New Wanderers Stadium, Johannesburg
Umpires: Bongani Jele and Murray Brown

- Warriors won the toss and elected to field.

26 April 2019
Scorecard

Warriors; 153/7 (20 overs)	v	Dolphins; 154/3 (18.2 overs)
Sisanda Magala 50 (32); Prenelan Subrayen 2/24 (4 overs)		Vaughn van Jaarsveld 112* (69); Sisanda Magala 1/22 (3.2 overs)

Dolphins won by 7 wickets
St George's Park, Port Elizabeth
Umpires: Clifford Isaacs and Shaun George

- Dolphins won the toss and elected to field.

26 April 2019
Scorecard

Knights; 148/8 (20 overs)	v	Titans; 150/4 (19.2 overs)
Shadley van Schalkwyk 49 (35); Gregory Mahlokwana 2/25 (4 overs)		Henry Davids 47 (36); Gerald Coetzee 2/26 (4 overs)

Titans won by 6 wickets
Centurion Park, Centurion
Umpires: Ryan Hendricks and Adrian Holdstock

- Titans won the toss and elected to field.
- Luvuyo Adam (Knights) made his T20 debut.

26 April 2019
Scorecard

Cape Cobras; 133/7 (20 overs)	v	Lions; 134/4 (15.5 overs)
Jason Smith 49* (35); Nono Pongolo 1/17 (4 overs)		Rassie van der Dussen 59* (36); JP Duminy 1/5 (1 over)

Lions won by 6 wickets
Newlands, Cape Town
Umpires: Allahudien Paleker and Philip Vosloo

- Lions won the toss and elected to field.

28 April 2019
Scorecard

Knights; 96/7 (20 overs)	v	Warriors; 99/6 (17.1 overs)
Ryan McLaren 39* (39); Andrew Birch 4/10 (4 overs)		Gihahn Cloete 40 (40); Tshepo Ntuli 2/11 (4 overs)

Warriors won by 4 wickets
Buffalo Park, East London
Umpires: Arno Jacobs and Johan Cloete

- Warriors won the toss and elected to field.
- Marco Jansen (Knights) made his T20 debut.

28 April 2019
Scorecard

Cape Cobras; 121/7 (20 overs)	v	Dolphins; 124/5 (15.1 overs)
Vernon Philander 32* (23); Robbie Frylinck 3/39 (4 overs)		Vaughn van Jaarsveld 48 (31); Rory Kleinveldt 2/22 (4 overs)

Dolphins won by 5 wickets
Kingsmead, Durban
Umpires: Dennis Smith and Brad White

- Cape Cobras won the toss and elected to bat.

28 April 2019
Scorecard

Titans; 148/7 (20 overs)	v	Lions; 149/6 (19 overs)
Farhaan Behardien 48 (38); Lizaad Williams 3/32 (4 overs)		Ryan Rickelton 74 (47); Junior Dala 2/22 (4 overs)

Lions won by 4 wickets
Centurion Park, Centurion
Umpires: Lubabalo Gcuma and Stephen Harris

- Lions won the toss and elected to field.

== Finals ==
1st Semi Final
1 May 2019
Scorecard

Dolphins; 163/8 (20 overs)	v	Lions; 164/2 (18.4 overs)
Vaughn van Jaarsveld 47 (34); Wiaan Mulder 2/23 (3 overs)		Rassie van der Dussen 69* (49); Daryn Dupavillon 2/22 (4 overs)

Lions won by 8 wickets
Wanderers Stadium, Johannesburg
Umpires: Stephen Harris and Allahudien Paleker

- Lions won the toss and elected to field.

2nd Semi Final
1 May 2019
Scorecard

Warriors; 172/7 (20 overs)	v	Cape Cobras; 157/8 (20 overs)
Matthew Breetzke 60 (38); Rory Kleinveldt 4/33 (4 overs)		David Bedingham 73 (39); Sisanda Magala 2/19 (4 overs)

Warriors won by 15 runs
Buffalo Park, East London
Umpires: Arno Jacobs and Brad White

- Cape Cobras won the toss and elected to field.

Final
5 May 2019
Scorecard

Lions; 203/4 (20 overs)	v	Warriors; 192 (19.2 overs)
Temba Bavuma 104 (63); Andrew Birch 3/36 (4 overs)		JJ Smuts 121 (60); Bjorn Fortuin 4/27 (4 overs)

Lions won by 11 runs
Wanderers Stadium, Johannesburg
Umpires: Dennis Smith and Lubabalo Gcuma

- Warriors won the toss and elected to field.
