= Tsepo =

Tsepo, alternatively spelled Tšepo or Tshepo is a Southern African unisex given name meaning hope and derived from the Sesotho verb 'tshepa', which means hope. People with this name include:

- Tšepo Lekhoana (born 1988), Mosotho footballer
- Tsepo Masilela (born 1985), South African footballer
- Tsepo Mathibelle (born 1991), Mosotho long-distance runner
- Tsepo Mhlongo (fl. 1998-present), South African politician
- Tsepo Mzonethi (fl. 2008-present), Mosotho politician
- Tsepo Ndwandwa (born 1995), South African cricketer
- Tsepo Seturumane (born 1992), Mosotho footballer
- Tšepo Toloane (born 1997), Mosotho footballer
- Tsepo Tshola (1953–2021), Mosotho jazz musician
- Tshepo Gumede (born 1991), South African soccer player
- Tshepo Khoza (fl. 2024-present), South African politician
- Tshepo Liphoko (born 1995), South African footballer
- Tshepo Louw (born 1990), South African politician
- Tshepo Mangena (born 1983), South Africna cricketer
- Tshepo Maseko (born 1974), South African actor
- Tshepo Moreki (born 1993), South African cricketer
- Tshepo Motaung (born 1999), South African cricketer
- Tshepo Motlhabankwe (born 1980), Motswana footballer
- Tshepo Motsepe (born 1953), South African physician and businesswoman
- Tshepo Ngwane (born 1974), South African actor
- Tshepo Ntuli (born 1995), South African cricketer
- Tshepo Rikhotso (born 1993), South African soccer player
- Tshepo Seroalo (born 1997), South African cricketer
- Tshepo Tshite (born 1997), South African middle-distance runner
- Tshepo Manong (born 1998), South African Barry White tribute act
