= South African cricket team in Pakistan in 2020–21 =

International cricket tour

	Pakistan	South Africa
- Dates: 26 January – 14 February 2021
Captains	Babar Azam	Quinton de Kock (Tests); Heinrich Klaasen (T20Is)

Test series
- Result: Pakistan won the 2-match series 2–0
Most runs	Faheem Ashraf (171)	Aiden Markram (227)
Most wickets	Hasan Ali (12)	Keshav Maharaj (10)
- Player of the series: Mohammad Rizwan (Pak)

Twenty20 International series
- Results: Pakistan won the 3-match series 2–1
Most runs	Mohammad Rizwan (197)	David Miller (116)
Most wickets	Usman Qadir (4)	Dwaine Pretorius (6); Tabraiz Shamsi (6)
- Player of the series: Mohammad Rizwan (Pak)

The South Africa cricket team toured Pakistan in January 2021 to play two Test matches and three Twenty20 International (T20I) matches against the Pakistan cricket team. The Test series formed part of the inaugural 2019–2021 ICC World Test Championship. It was the first time in fourteen years that South Africa toured Pakistan.

In December 2020, Cricket South Africa (CSA) confirmed that they would be touring Pakistan. The Test matches took place in Karachi and Rawalpindi, with the T20I matches being played in Lahore.

Pakistan won the first Test by seven wickets, to take a 1–0 lead in the series. Pakistan won the second Test by 95 runs, taking the series 2–0, and recording their first series win against South Africa since October 2003. The T20I series was level after the first two matches, with Pakistan winning the third match by four wickets, winning the series 2–1. With winning the third match, Pakistan became the first men's team to win 100 T20I matches.

== Background ==
After successfully arranging a limited-overs series against Sri Lanka in Pakistan, the Pakistan Cricket Board (PCB) chairman, Ehsan Mani announced that they would no longer play their future home matches at a neutral venue. For the tour to go ahead, Cricket South Africa needed to grant permission for their players to travel as a group, due to the situation of the COVID-19 pandemic in South Africa. In August 2020, the South Africa women's team were denied a request to travel to England.

On 25 September 2020, the PCB confirmed that the South African team would be touring Pakistan, as per the schedule. A month later, Cricket South Africa sent a security delegation to Pakistan to perform a feasibility assessment for the tour. South Africa last toured Pakistan in October 2007. On 16 January 2021, the PCB named the match officials for the tour. Aleem Dar, who has been the on-field umpire for 132 Tests prior to the tour, stood in his first Test match at home. Ahsan Raza also made his debut as an on-field umpire in Test cricket.

== Squads ==
Tests		T20Is	
Pakistan	South Africa	Pakistan	South Africa
Babar Azam (c); Mohammad Rizwan (vc, wk); Shaheen Afridi; Sarfaraz Ahmed (wk); Fawad Alam; Abid Ali; Azhar Ali; Hasan Ali; Nauman Ali; Faheem Ashraf; Imran Butt; Kamran Ghulam; Sajid Khan; Tabish Khan; Mohammad Nawaz; Haris Rauf; Agha Salman; Abdullah Shafique; Yasir Shah; Saud Shakeel	Quinton de Kock (c, wk); ~~Ottniel Baartman~~; Temba Bavuma; Faf du Plessis; Daryn Dupavillon; Dean Elgar; Sarel Erwee; Beuran Hendricks; Marco Jansen; George Linde; Keshav Maharaj; Aiden Markram; Wiaan Mulder; Lungi Ngidi; Anrich Nortje; Keegan Petersen; Dwaine Pretorius; Kagiso Rabada; Tabraiz Shamsi; Lutho Sipamla; Rassie van der Dussen; Kyle Verreynne	Babar Azam (c); Shaheen Afridi; Iftikhar Ahmed; Sarfaraz Ahmed; Asif Ali; Haider Ali; Hasan Ali; Faheem Ashraf; Danish Aziz; Amad Butt; Zafar Gohar; Mohammad Hasnain; Zahid Mahmood; Mohammad Nawaz; Usman Qadir; Haris Rauf; Mohammad Rizwan (wk); Khushdil Shah; Hussain Talat; Aamer Yamin	Heinrich Klaasen (c, wk); Nandre Burger; Okuhle Cele; Junior Dala; Bjorn Fortuin; Reeza Hendricks; George Linde; Janneman Malan; David Miller; Andile Phehlukwayo; Dwaine Pretorius; Ryan Rickelton; Tabraiz Shamsi; Lutho Sipamla; JJ Smuts; Glenton Stuurman; Jacques Snyman; Pite van Biljon

In December 2020, Pakistan's Shadab Khan suffered an injury ahead of the Test series against New Zealand. On 26 December 2020, the Pakistan Cricket Board (PCB) confirmed that he had been ruled out of the second Test against New Zealand, and the Test matches at home against South Africa. Before South Africa departed for the tour, Ottniel Baartman was ruled out of their Test squad, with Marco Jansen named as his replacement. On 24 January 2021, the PCB confirmed that seventeen players would be available for selection for the first Test match, with Abdullah Shafique, Kamran Ghulam and Agha Salman staying with the squad for training sessions. The PCB also retained the same seventeen players for selection for the second Test match.

== Test series ==
=== 1st Test ===
26–30 January 2021 (Note: While five days of play were scheduled for each Test, the first Test reached a result in four days.)
Scorecard

South Africa	v	Pakistan
220 (69.2 overs); Dean Elgar 58 (106); Yasir Shah 3/54 (22 overs)		378 (119.2 overs); Fawad Alam 109 (245); Kagiso Rabada 3/70 (27 overs)
245 (100.3 overs); Aiden Markram 74 (224); Nauman Ali 5/35 (25.3 overs)		90/3 (22.5 overs); Azhar Ali 31* (47); Anrich Nortje 2/24 (7 overs)

Pakistan won by 7 wickets
National Stadium, Karachi
Umpires: Aleem Dar (Pak) and Ahsan Raza (Pak)
Player of the match: Fawad Alam (Pak)

- South Africa won the toss and elected to bat.
- Nauman Ali and Imran Butt (Pak) both made their Test debuts.
- Babar Azam captained Pakistan for the first time in Tests.
- Quinton de Kock (SA) played in his 50th Test.
- Ahsan Raza (Pak) stood in his first Test as an on-field umpire.
- Kagiso Rabada (SA) took his 200th wicket in Tests.
- Nauman Ali became the 12th bowler for Pakistan to take a five-wicket haul on debut in Tests.
- World Test Championship points: Pakistan 60, South Africa 0.

=== 2nd Test ===
4–8 February 2021
Scorecard

Pakistan	v	South Africa
272 (114.3 overs); Faheem Ashraf 78* (160); Anrich Nortje 5/56 (24.3 overs)		201 (65.4 overs); Temba Bavuma 44* (138); Hasan Ali 5/54 (15.4 overs)
298 (102 overs); Mohammad Rizwan 115* (204); George Linde 5/64 (26 overs)		274 (91.4 overs); Aiden Markram 108 (243); Hasan Ali 5/60 (16 overs)

Pakistan won by 95 runs
Rawalpindi Cricket Stadium, Rawalpindi
Umpires: Aleem Dar (Pak) and Ahsan Raza (Pak)
Player of the match: Hasan Ali (Pak)

- Pakistan won the toss and elected to bat.
- No play was possible after tea on day 1 due to rain.
- Mohammad Rizwan (Pak) scored his first century in Tests.
- George Linde (SA) took his first five-wicket haul in Tests.
- World Test Championship points: Pakistan 60, South Africa 0.

== T20I series ==
=== 1st T20I ===
11 February 2021
18:00 (N)
Scorecard

Pakistan; 169/6 (20 overs)	v	South Africa; 166/6 (20 overs)
Mohammad Rizwan 104* (64); Andile Phehlukwayo 2/33 (4 overs)		Reeza Hendricks 54 (42); Usman Qadir 2/21 (4 overs)

Pakistan won by 3 runs
Gaddafi Stadium, Lahore
Umpires: Aleem Dar (Pak) and Ahsan Raza (Pak)
Player of the match: Mohammad Rizwan (Pak)

- South Africa won the toss and elected to field.
- Jacques Snyman (SA) made his T20I debut.
- Heinrich Klaasen captained South Africa for the first time in T20Is.
- Mohammad Rizwan (Pak) scored his first century in T20Is.

=== 2nd T20I ===
13 February 2021
18:00 (N)
Scorecard

Pakistan; 144/7 (20 overs)	v	South Africa; 145/4 (16.2 overs)
Mohammad Rizwan 51 (41); Dwaine Pretorius 5/17 (4 overs)		Reeza Hendricks 42 (30); Shaheen Afridi 2/18 (3 overs)

South Africa won by 6 wickets
Gaddafi Stadium, Lahore
Umpires: Shozab Raza (Pak) and Asif Yaqoob (Pak)
Player of the match: Dwaine Pretorius (SA)

- South Africa won the toss and elected to field.
- Glenton Stuurman (SA) made his T20I debut.
- Dwaine Pretorius (SA) took his first five-wicket haul in T20Is.
- Dwaine Pretorius also took the best figures by a bowler for South Africa in T20Is.

=== 3rd T20I ===
14 February 2021
18:00 (N)
Scorecard

South Africa; 164/8 (20 overs)	v	Pakistan; 169/6 (18.4 overs)
David Miller 85* (45); Zahid Mahmood 3/40 (4 overs)		Babar Azam 44 (30); Tabraiz Shamsi 4/25 (4 overs)

Pakistan won by 4 wickets
Gaddafi Stadium, Lahore
Umpires: Aleem Dar (Pak) and Rashid Riaz (Pak)
Player of the match: Mohammad Nawaz (Pak)

- Pakistan won the toss and elected to field.
- Zahid Mahmood (Pak) made his T20I debut.
