= Jean-Pierre Le Roux =

Jean-Pierre Le Roux may refer to:

- Jean-Pierre Le Roux (chess player) (born 1982), French chess player
- Jean-Pierre le Roux (cricketer) (born 1993), South African cricketer
