= Okuhle =

Okuhle is a Nguni given name meaning "that which is beautiful" or "that which is good. Notable people with the name include:

- Okuhle Cele (born 1997), South African cricketer
- Okuhle Dlamini, South African beauty queen, Little Miss South Africa 2025
- Aphelele Onke Okuhle Fassi (born 1998), South African rugby player
