= Marlon Jansen =

South African cricket umpire (born 1980)

Personal information
- Born: 16 May 1980 (age 46); Bloemfontein, South Africa

Umpiring information
- Source: Cricinfo, 2 March 2017

Marlon Jansen (born 16 May 1980) is a South African cricket umpire. He has stood in matches in the 2016–17 Sunfoil 3-Day Cup and the 2016–17 CSA Provincial One-Day Challenge tournaments.
