= Tyron Koen =

South African cricketer (born 1997)

Personal information
- Born: 25 October 1997 (age 29)
- Source: ESPNcricinfo, 17 November 2016

Tyron Koen (born 25 October 1997) is a South African cricketer. He made his first-class debut for KwaZulu-Natal in the 2016–17 Sunfoil 3-Day Cup on 17 November 2016.

He made his List A debut for KwaZulu-Natal in the 2016–17 CSA Provincial One-Day Challenge on 20 November 2016. He made his Twenty20 debut for KwaZulu-Natal in the 2017 Africa T20 Cup on 8 September 2017.
