= Jacques Fourie =

Namibian cricketer (born 1996)

Personal information
- Born: 20 December 1996 (age 29)
- Source: ESPNcricinfo, 17 November 2016

Jacques Fourie (born 20 December 1996) is a Namibian cricketer. He made his first-class debut for Namibia in the 2016–17 Sunfoil 3-Day Cup on 17 November 2016. He made his List A debut for Namibia in the 2016–17 CSA Provincial One-Day Challenge on 15 January 2017.
