= Migael Pretorius =

South African cricketer (born 1995)

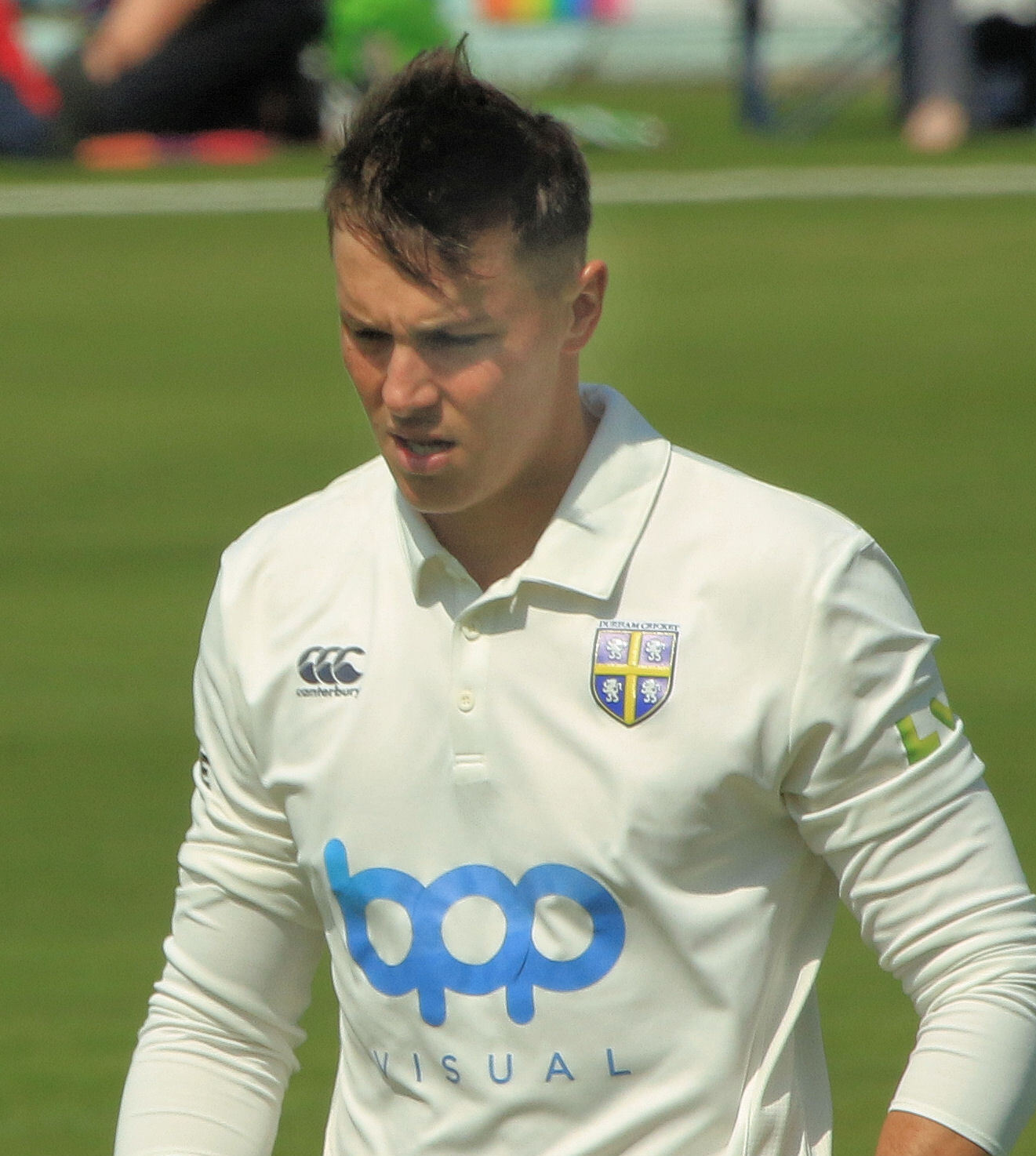
- Pretorius playing for Durham in 2023

Personal information
- Full name: Migael Pretorius
- Born: 24 March 1995 (age 31); Vereeniging, Gauteng, South Africa
- Batting: Right-handed
- Bowling: Right-arm fast

Domestic team information
- Years: Team
- 2015/16–2017/18: Northerns
- 2017/18: Titans
- 2018/19–2019/20: North West
- 2018/19–2019/20: Lions
- 2020/21: Knights
- 2021–2022: Jamaica Tallawahs
- 2021/22–2022/23: Free State
- 2022/23–2024/25: Pretoria Capitals
- 2023: Durham
- 2023/24–present: North West
- 2024–present: Somerset
- First-class debut: 14 October 2016 Northerns v Eastern Province
- List A debut: 13 December 2015 Northerns v North West

Career statistics
Competition	FC	LA	T20
Matches	90	55	88
Runs scored	2,623	394	412
Batting average	25.46	12.31	10.30
100s/50s	1/18	0/0	0/0
Top score	109*	33	38*
Balls bowled	13,909	2,576	1,691
Wickets	267	75	100
Bowling average	27.69	27.69	24.42
5 wickets in innings	7	0	0
10 wickets in match	0	0	0
Best bowling	6/38	4/21	4/14
Catches/stumpings	19/–	10/–	16/–
- Source: ESPNcricinfo, 27 September 2026

Migael Pretorius (born 24 March 1995) is a South African cricketer. He is a right-handed batsman and right-arm medium bowler. He made his List A debut for Northerns against North West on 13 December 2015. He was the leading wicket-taker in the 2016–17 Sunfoil 3-Day Cup, with a total of 42 dismissals in ten matches.

In August 2017, he was named in Durban Qalandars' squad for the first season of the T20 Global League. However, in October 2017, Cricket South Africa initially postponed the tournament until November 2018, with it being cancelled soon after. He made his Twenty20 debut for Northerns in the 2017 Africa T20 Cup on 1 September 2017.

In June 2018, he was named in the squad for the Highveld Lions team for the 2018–19 season. In September 2018, he was named in North West's squad for the 2018 Africa T20 Cup. In September 2019, he was named in North West's squad for the 2019–20 CSA Provincial T20 Cup.

In December 2020, Pretorius was added to South Africa's Test squad for their series against Sri Lanka. In March 2021, Pretorius was named in South Africa's Twenty20 International (T20I) squad for their series against Pakistan. In April 2021, he was named in Free State's squad, ahead of the 2021–22 cricket season in South Africa.

In 2023 he joined Durham County Cricket Club.

In April 2024, Pretorius signed for Somerset County Cricket Club as an overseas player. In July 2024, he was named as an injury replacement for Gerald Coetzee for South Africa's test series against the West Indies. In February 2025, he re-signed with Somerset for the entirety of the 2025 English cricket season.
