= Luvuyo Adam =

South African cricketer (born 1992)

Personal information
- Full name: Luvuyo Adam
- Born: 16 October 1992 (age 34)
- Source: ESPNcricinfo, 9 February 2017

Luvuyo Adam (born 16 December 1992) is a South African cricketer. He made his first-class debut for Eastern Province in the 2016–17 Sunfoil 3-Day Cup on 9 February 2017. He made his List A debut for Eastern Province in the 2016–17 CSA Provincial One-Day Challenge on 12 February 2017.

Adam was the leading wicket-taker in the 2017–18 Sunfoil 3-Day Cup for Eastern Province, with 26 dismissals in ten matches. He made his Twenty20 debut for Knights in the 2018–19 CSA T20 Challenge on 26 April 2019.
