= Isma-eel Gafieldien =

South African cricketer (born 1996)

Personal information
- Born: 5 June 1996 (age 30)
- Batting: Left-handed
- Role: Top-order batsman
- Source: ESPNcricinfo, 10 November 2016

Isma-eel Gafieldien (born 5 June 1996) is a South African cricketer. He made his first-class debut for Boland in the 2016–17 Sunfoil 3-Day Cup on 10 November 2016. He made his List A debut for Boland in the 2016–17 CSA Provincial One-Day Challenge on 13 November 2016. In September 2019, he was named in Boland's squad for the 2019–20 CSA Provincial T20 Cup. He made his Twenty20 debut for Boland in the 2019–20 CSA Provincial T20 Cup on 13 September 2019.

In April 2021, he was named in Boland's squad, ahead of the 2021–22 cricket season in South Africa.

In 2021, Gafielden joined Coggeshall CC, Essex playing 17 games scoring 1019 runs at an average of 84.92.
