= Jonathan Draai =

South African cricketer (born 1997)

Personal information
- Born: 7 April 1997 (age 29)
- Source: ESPNcricinfo, 9 October 2016

Jonathan Draai (born 7 April 1997) is a South African cricketer. He made his List A debut for Free State in the 2016–17 CSA Provincial One-Day Challenge on 9 October 2016. He made his first-class debut for Free State in the 2016–17 Sunfoil 3-Day Cup on 9 February 2017.
