= Nkululeko Serame =

South African cricketer

Personal information
- Born: 26 January 1987 (age 39); Klerksdorp, Transvaal Province, South Africa
- Source: ESPNcricinfo, 16 September 2016

Adv. Nkululeko Molale Serame (born 26 January 1987) is a South African first-class cricketer. He played in the 2006 Under-19 Cricket World Cup in Sri Lanka. He is an off-spinner in the classic mould and a lower-order batsman.

Before the U19 World Cup, Serame had already played List A cricket, making his first-team debut in January 2006 for North West against Northerns. He took 1 wicket for 46 runs (1/46). He had a disappointing World Cup, in that in four matches he took one wicket at an average of 133.

Serame played for KwaZulu-Natal during the 2006–07 season, taking eight wickets at 30.25 in four first-class matches. He was selected for the South African Academy that toured Zimbabwe in August 2007. His best performance on tour and career to date came in the final one-day fixture when he took 5/25 in 10 overs.

He was included in the South Western Districts squad for the 2016 Africa T20 Cup. He made his Twenty20 (T20) debut for South Western Districts against Northern Cape on 16 September 2016 and made further T20 appearances for the Cape Cobras in December 2016.

Serame is an advocate of the High Court of South Africa. In September 2018, Serame was named in Boland's squad for the 2018 Africa T20 Cup as well as for the Cape Cobras T20 squad for the 2018-19 CSA T20 Challenge. He played first-class cricket for Boland until he retired from the game in 2020.

In March 2024 Serame was appointed Head Coach of the Bahamas Men's National Cricket Team for the 2024 Carib Cup T20I series between the Bahamas and Cayman Islands.
