= Dumisani Magala =

South African cricketer (born 1994)

Personal information
- Born: 22 November 1994 (age 31)
- Source: ESPNcricinfo, 12 January 2017

Dumisani Magala (born 22 November 1994) is a South African cricketer. He made his first-class debut for Eastern Province in the 2016–17 Sunfoil 3-Day Cup on 12 January 2017. He made his List A debut for Eastern Province in the 2016–17 CSA Provincial One-Day Challenge on 12 February 2017.
