= Neo Mlumbi =

South African cricketer (born 1986)

Personal information
- Born: 3 April 1996 (age 30); Cape Town, South Africa
- Source: ESPNcricinfo, 6 November 2016

Neo Mlumbi (born 3 April 1986) is a South African cricketer. He made his List A debut for Western Province in the 2016–17 CSA Provincial One-Day Challenge on 31 October 2016. He made his first-class debut for Western Province in the 2016–17 Sunfoil 3-Day Cup on 6 January 2017.
