= Jongile Kilani =

South African cricketer (born 1993)

Personal information
- Full name: Jongile Joseph Kilani
- Born: 21 August 1993 (age 33); Krugersdorp, South Africa
- Source: ESPNcricinfo, 2 September 2016

Jongile Kilani (born 21 August 1993) is a South African cricketer. He was included in the Border squad for the 2015 Africa T20 Cup. He made his first-class debut for South Western Districts in the 2016–17 Sunfoil 3-Day Cup on 3 November 2016.
