= Jovuan van Wyngaardt =

South African cricketer (born 1993)

Personal information
- Born: 13 January 1993 (age 33); Klerksdorp, South Africa
- Source: ESPNcricinfo, 15 December 2016

Jovuan van Wyngaardt (born 13 January 1993) is a South African cricketer. He made his first-class debut for North West in the 2016–17 Sunfoil 3-Day Cup on 15 December 2016. He made his List A debut for North West in the 2016–17 CSA Provincial One-Day Challenge on 26 February 2017.

In September 2018, he was named in North West's squad for the 2018 Africa T20 Cup. He made his Twenty20 debut for North West in the 2018 Africa T20 Cup on 14 September 2018.
