= Victor Mahlangu =

South African cricketer (born 1990)

Personal information
- Full name: Victor Bafana Mahlangu
- Born: 5 October 1990 (age 36); Pretoria, South Africa
- Source: ESPNcricinfo, 15 September 2016

Victor Mahlangu (born 5 October 1990) is a South African cricketer. He was included in the Northerns squad for the 2016 Africa T20 Cup. In September 2018, he was named in Northerns' squad for the 2018 Africa T20 Cup. In April 2021, he was named in Northern Cape's squad, ahead of the 2021–22 cricket season in South Africa.
