= Lance Humphrey =

South African cricketer (born 1994)

Personal information
- Born: 30 December 1994 (age 31); Johannesburg, South Africa
- Source: ESPNcricinfo, 18 February 2017

Lance Humphrey (born 30 December 1994) is a South African cricketer. He made his first-class debut for Easterns in the 2016–17 Sunfoil 3-Day Cup on 16 February 2017. Prior to his first-class debut, he played Twenty20 cricket for Easterns in the CSA Provincial T20 Challenge in 2014. He made his List A debut for Easterns in the 2017–18 CSA Provincial One-Day Challenge on 11 February 2018.
