= Jacques Snyman =

South African cricketer

Personal information
- Full name: Gerrit Jacques Snyman
- Born: 10 May 1994 (age 32); Pretoria, Gauteng, South Africa
- Batting: Right-handed
- Bowling: Right-arm off break
- Role: Batting all-rounder

International information
- National side: South Africa (2021)
- Only T20I (cap 88): 11 February 2021 v Pakistan

Domestic team information
- Years: Team
- 2016/17–2019/20: Northern Cape
- 2018/19–2020/21: Knights
- 2019: Jozi Stars
- 2021/22–present: Free State

Career statistics
Competition	T20I	FC	LA	T20
Matches	1	35	47	39
Runs scored	2	2,529	1,510	755
Batting average	2.00	42.15	35.11	20.40
100s/50s	0/0	5/12	4/7	1/2
Top score	2	209	135	117
Balls bowled	6	1,818	1,792	388
Wickets	0	39	30	15
Bowling average	–	46.61	44.43	30.33
5 wickets in innings	0	1	1	0
10 wickets in match	0	0	0	0
Best bowling	–	5/67	5/33	3/15
Catches/stumpings	1/–	16/–	19/–	11/–
- Source: ESPNcricinfo, 7 January 2023

Gerrit Jacques Snyman (born 10 May 1994) is a South African cricketer. A batting all-rounder, he bats right-handed and bowls off spin. He made his South Africa debut in a Twenty20 International (T20I) against Pakistan in February 2021.

== Career ==
Snyman was included in the Northern Cape squad for the 2016 Africa T20 Cup. He made his Twenty20 (T20) debut for Northern Cape against South Western Districts on 16 September 2016. He made his first-class debut for Northern Cape on 1 December 2016 in the 2016–17 Sunfoil 3-Day Cup. He made his List A debut for Northern Cape on 17 December 2016 in the 2016–17 CSA Provincial One-Day Challenge.

Snyman was the leading run-scorer in the 2017–18 Sunfoil 3-Day Cup for Northern Cape, with 695 runs in seven matches. In September 2018, he was named in Northern Cape's squad for the 2018 Africa T20 Cup. He was the leading run-scorer for Northern Cape in the 2018–19 CSA 3-Day Provincial Cup, with 381 runs in four matches.

In September 2019, Snyman was named in Northern Cape's squad for the 2019–20 CSA Provincial T20 Cup.

In January 2021, Snyman was named in South Africa's T20I squad for their series against Pakistan. He made his T20I debut for South Africa, against Pakistan, on 11 February 2021.

In April 2021, Snyman was named in Free State's squad, ahead of the 2021–22 cricket season in South Africa.
