= Tumelo Simelane =

South African cricketer (born 1995)

Personal information
- Born: 10 July 1995 (age 31)
- Source: ESPNcricinfo, 11 December 2016

Tumelo Simelane (born 10 July 1995) is a South African cricketer. He made his List A debut for Easterns in the 2016–17 CSA Provincial One-Day Challenge on 11 December 2016. He made his first-class debut for Easterns in the 2016–17 Sunfoil 3-Day Cup on 12 January 2017. He made his Twenty20 debut for Easterns in the 2017 Africa T20 Cup on 25 August 2017. In April 2021, he was named in Easterns' squad, ahead of the 2021–22 cricket season in South Africa.
