= Tshepo Seroalo =

South African cricketer (born 1997)

Personal information
- Born: 22 June 1997 (age 29)
- Source: ESPNcricinfo, 17 November 2016

Tshepo Seroalo (born 22 June 1997) is a South African cricketer. He made his first-class debut for North West in the 2016–17 Sunfoil 3-Day Cup on 17 November 2016. He made his List A debut for North West in the 2016–17 CSA Provincial One-Day Challenge on 20 November 2016.
