= Jean-Pierre le Roux (cricketer) =

South African cricketer (born 1993)

Personal information
- Born: 19 April 1993 (age 33)
- Source: Cricinfo, 23 March 2017

Jean-Piere le Roux (born 2 November1993) is a South African cricketer. He made his first-class debut for North West in the 2016–17 Sunfoil 3-Day Cup on 23 March 2017.
