= Andre Malan (cricketer) =

South African cricketer

Personal information
- Full name: Andries Jacobus Malan
- Born: 29 July 1991 (age 35); Nelspruit, Transvaal Province, South Africa
- Batting: Right-handed
- Bowling: Right-arm fast-medium
- Relatives: Pieter Malan (brother); Janneman Malan (brother)

Domestic team information
- Years: Team
- 2010/11–2012/13: Northerns
- 2014/15–2017/18: North West
- 2018: Northern Knights
- 2018/19–2019/20: Western Province
- 2019/20: Cape Cobras
- 2021/22: South Western Districts
- FC debut: 3 February 2011 Northerns v Western Province
- LA debut: 6 February 2011 Northerns v Western Province

Career statistics
Competition	FC	LA	T20
Matches	57	46	29
Runs scored	2,955	1,246	532
Batting average	38.37	31.15	23.13
100s/50s	8/13	2/7	0/5
Top score	177*	123*	82*
Balls bowled	3,634	1,455	84
Wickets	67	47	2
Bowling average	30.11	24.31	70.50
5 wickets in innings	2	1	0
10 wickets in match	0	0	0
Best bowling	5/37	5/57	1/32
Catches/stumpings	24/–	14/–	11/–
- Source: ESPNcricinfo, 17 May 2022

Andries Jacobus Malan (born 29 July 1991) is a South African cricketer. He was included in the North West squad for the 2016 Africa T20 Cup. In August 2017, he was named in Jo'burg Giants' squad for the first season of the T20 Global League. However, in October 2017, Cricket South Africa initially postponed the tournament until November 2018, with it being cancelled soon after.

He won the North-West Dragons Player of the Year award for the 2016–17 season. In September 2018, he was named as the captain of Western Province's squad for the 2018 Africa T20 Cup. In September 2019, he was named as the captain of Western Province's squad for the 2019–20 CSA Provincial T20 Cup. In April 2021, he was named in South Western Districts' squad, ahead of the 2021–22 cricket season in South Africa.
