= Tsepo Mzonethi =

Kingdom of Lesotho politician

Tsepo Monethi is a Kingdom of Lesotho politician who served as the vice president of the Senate of the Kingdom of Lesotho from 2017 to 2022.

== Career ==
Monethi was elected National Secretary of the National Youth League of the Basotho National Party (BNP) in 2008 and later became leader of the league until 2010 and served as the BNP Public Relations Officer before stepping down in 2013 after failing his re-election bid. He was elected vice president of the Senate along with the President Mamonaheng Mokitimi in 2017. Monethi took over from Prince Seeiso Bereng Seeiso.
