= Eden Links =

South African cricketer (born 1989)

Personal information
- Born: 25 March 1989 (age 37); Hermanus, South Africa
- Source: ESPNcricinfo, 18 November 2016

Eden Links (born 25 March 1989) is a South African cricketer. He made his first-class debut for Northerns in the 2009–10 CSA Provincial Three-Day Challenge on 19 November 2009.
