= Pieter Malan =

South African cricketer

Personal information
- Full name: Pieter Jacobus Malan
- Born: 13 August 1989 (age 37); Nelspruit, Transvaal Province, South Africa
- Batting: Right-handed
- Bowling: Right-arm medium-fast
- Role: Batsman
- Relatives: Andre Malan (brother); Janneman Malan (brother)

International information
- National side: South Africa (2020)
- Test debut (cap 343): 3 January 2020 v England
- Last Test: 24 January 2020 v England

Domestic team information
- Years: Team
- 2006/07–2012/13: Northerns
- 2008/09–2012/13: Titans
- 2013/14–present: Western Province
- 2014/15–present: Cape Cobras
- 2017/18–2018/19: Boland
- 2021: Warwickshire
- 2022–2023: Middlesex

Career statistics
Competition	Test	FC	LA	T20
Matches	3	185	127	54
Runs scored	156	12,639	5,053	1,688
Batting average	26.00	44.66	45.93	38.79
100s/50s	0/1	38/53	14/26	1/11
Top score	84	264	169*	140*
Balls bowled	12	961	245	24
Wickets	0	21	1	2
Bowling average	–	24.28	274.00	15.00
5 wickets in innings	–	1	0	0
10 wickets in match	–	0	0	0
Best bowling	–	5/35	1/28	2/30
Catches/stumpings	0/–	123/–	54/1	31/–
- Source: CricInfo, 20 May 2023

Pieter Jacobus Malan (born 13 August 1989) is a South African professional cricketer. He is a right-handed batsman and bowls right-arm medium-fast. Since 2007, he has played first-class cricket for both Northerns and Titans. He made his international debut for the South Africa cricket team in January 2020.

== Domestic career ==
Malan has appeared for several English clubs including Nelson, Royton, Colne and Rishton. In the 2011 season he became the first player ever to score 1,000 runs in one season for Barrow since the club joined the Northern Cricket League in 2004, amassing 1,051 runs at an average of 65.69. He was then signed by Lancashire League club Ramsbottom as the club professional for the 2012 season. He was included in the Western Province cricket team squad for the 2015 Africa T20 Cup.

He was the leading run-scorer in the 2016–17 Sunfoil 3-Day Cup, with a total of 1,069 runs in nine matches.

In August 2017, he was named in Cape Town Knight Riders' squad for the first season of the T20 Global League. However, in October 2017, Cricket South Africa initially postponed the tournament until November 2018, with it being cancelled soon after.

In October 2017, he scored his 25th century in first-class cricket, batting for Cape Cobras against Warriors in the 2017–18 Sunfoil Series. He was the leading run-scorer in the 2017–18 Momentum One Day Cup, with a total of 615 runs in eleven matches.

In June 2018, he was named in the squad for the Cape Cobras team for the 2018–19 season. In September 2018, he was named in Boland's squad for the 2018 Africa T20 Cup. In November 2018, during the 2018–19 CSA 4-Day Franchise Series, he scored his 30th century in first-class cricket. He was the leading run-scorer for the Cape Cobras in the 2018–19 CSA 4-Day Franchise Series, with 821 runs in ten matches.

In April 2021, he was named in Boland's squad, ahead of the 2021–22 cricket season in South Africa. In February 2022, Malan was named as the captain of the Rocks for the 2021–22 CSA T20 Challenge.

== International career ==
In December 2019, he was named in South Africa's Test squad for their series against England. He made his Test debut for South Africa on 3 January 2020 in the 2nd Test, scoring 5 in the first innings followed by 84 in the 2nd innings.
