= Gino Vries =

South African cricketer (born 1987)

Personal information
- Born: 10 April 1987 (age 39); Bloemfontein, South Africa
- Source: ESPNcricinfo, 9 October 2016

Gino Vries (born 10 April 1987) is a South African first-class cricketer who plays for Free State.
