= Lazarus Mokoena =

South African cricketer (born 1990)

Personal information
- Born: 30 July 1990 (age 36); Johannesburg, South Africa
- Source: ESPNcricinfo, 15 October 2016

Lazarus Mokoena (born 30 July 1990) is a South African cricketer. He made his first-class debut for Gauteng in the 2014–15 Sunfoil 3-Day Cup on 22 January 2015.
