= Mthobeli Bangindawo =

South African cricketer (born 1995)

Personal information
- Born: 6 May 1995 (age 31)

International information
- National side: South Africa
- Source: ESPNcricinfo, 15 October 2016

Mthobeli Bangindawo (born 6 May 1995) is a South African cricketer. He made his first-class debut for South Western Districts cricket team on 13 October 2016.
