= Wesley Coulentianos =

South African cricketer (born 1994)

Personal information
- Born: 14 January 1994 (age 32); Boksburg, South Africa
- Batting: Left-handed
- Bowling: Left-arm medium pace
- Role: Batter

Domestic team information
- Years: Team
- 2013–2023: Easterns
- Border

Career statistics
Competition	FC	LA	T20
Matches	84	38	10
Runs scored	4825	1118	145
Batting average	37.99	36.06	16.11
100s/50s	11/26	0/10	0
Top score	172	76*	33
Balls bowled	92	18	0
Wickets	1	0	0
Bowling average	85.00	-	-
5 wickets in innings	0	0	0
10 wickets in match	0	0	0
Best bowling	1/31	-	-
Catches/stumpings	47/0	12/0	2/0
- Source: Cricinfo, 10 December 2024

Wesley Coulentianos (born 14 January 1994) is a South African cricketer and administrator. A left-handed batter, he played most of his career for Easterns. He also played for Border for a short time.

Coulentianos attended the University of Pretoria, where he studied civil engineering. In January 2013, aged 19, he made he professional debut in first-class cricket for Easterns against Border.

In May 2023, having retired from playing, Coulentianos was appointed chief executive officer of the Eastern Cricket Union.
