= Armand Erasmus =

South African cricketer (born 1992)

Personal information
- Full name: Armand Francois Erasmus
- Born: 19 June 1992 (age 34); Brakpan, South Africa
- Source: ESPNcricinfo, 7 October 2018

Armand Francois Erasmus (born 19 June 1992) is a South African cricketer. He made his first-class debut for North West in the 2011–12 CSA Provincial Three-Day Challenge on 16 February 2012. In September 2018, he was named in Easterns' squad for the 2018 Africa T20 Cup. In September 2019, he was named in Easterns' squad for the 2019–20 CSA Provincial T20 Cup.
