= Ruan Sadler =

South African cricketer (born 1992)

Personal information
- Born: 3 January 1992 (age 34); Pretoria, South Africa
- Source: ESPNcricinfo, 30 October 2016

Ruan Sadler (born 3 January 1992) is a South African cricketer. He made his first-class debut for Northerns in the 2015–16 Sunfoil 3-Day Cup on 5 January 2016. He made his List A debut for Easterns in the 2016–17 CSA Provincial One-Day Challenge on 30 October 2016. In September 2018, he was named in Limpopo's squad for the 2018 Africa T20 Cup. He made his Twenty20 debut for Limpopo in the 2018 Africa T20 Cup on 14 September 2018.
