= Bjorn Fortuin =

South African cricketer (born 1994)

Personal information
- Born: 21 October 1994 (age 32); Paarl, Western Cape, South Africa
- Batting: Right-handed
- Bowling: Slow left-arm orthodox
- Role: Bowler

International information
- National side: South Africa (2019 – present)
- ODI debut (cap 136): 7 February 2020 v England
- Last ODI: 13 September 2026 v Namibia
- T20I debut (cap 84): 18 September 2019 v India
- Last T20I: 6 September 2026 v Zimbabwe

Career statistics
Competition	ODI	T20I	FC	LA
Matches	21	32	80	125
Runs scored	83	129	3,060	1,064
Batting average	7.54	10.75	32.21	16.88
100s/50s	0/0	0/0	8/10	0/3
Top score	28	32	194	62*
Balls bowled	1,017	592	13,876	5,700
Wickets	27	33	234	150
Bowling average	31.25	23.27	27.60	29.50
5 wickets in innings	0	0	9	1
10 wickets in match	0	0	0	0
Best bowling	4/33	4/24	7/70	5/34
Catches/stumpings	4/–	9/–	33/–	34/–
Medal record
Men's Cricket
Representing South Africa
ICC T20 World Cup
Runner-up	2024 West Indies & USA
- Source: Cricinfo, 2 October 2026

Bjorn Carl Fortuin also known as Imaad Fortuin is a South African professional cricketer. He made his international debut for the South Africa cricket team in September 2019.

== Domestic career ==
He was included in the North West cricket team squad for the 2015 Africa T20 Cup. In August 2017, he was named in Durban Qalandars' squad for the first season of the T20 Global League. However, in October 2017, Cricket South Africa initially postponed the tournament until November 2018, with it being cancelled soon after.

In June 2018, he was named in the squad for the Highveld Lions team for the 2018–19 season. In October 2018, he was named in Paarl Rocks' squad for the first edition of the Mzansi Super League T20 tournament. He was the leading wicket-taker in the 2018–19 CSA T20 Challenge tournament, with fifteen dismissals in ten matches. In August 2019, he was named the CSA T20 Challenge Player of the Season at Cricket South Africa's annual award ceremony.

In September 2019, he was named in the squad for the Paarl Rocks team for the 2019 Mzansi Super League tournament. In April 2021, he was named in Gauteng's squad, ahead of the 2021–22 cricket season in South Africa. On 1 April 2022, in Division One of the 2021–22 CSA One-Day Cup, Fortuin took his first five-wicket haul in List A cricket.

In May 2025, Fortuin signed a short-term contract to play for English club Hampshire in the early stages of that year's T20 Blast.

== International career ==
In August 2019, he was named in South Africa's Twenty20 International (T20I) squad for their series against India. He made his T20I debut for South Africa, against India, on 18 September 2019. In January 2020, he was named in South Africa's One Day International (ODI) squad for their series against England. He made his ODI debut for South Africa, against England, on 7 February 2020.

In September 2021, Fortuin was named in South Africa's squad for the 2021 ICC Men's T20 World Cup.

In May 2024, he was named in South Africa's squad for the 2024 ICC Men's T20 World Cup tournament.

== Personal life ==
On 24 April 2021, Fortuin converted to Islam, adopting the Muslim name of Imaad. He is the second South African international cricketer, after Wayne Parnell, to convert to Islam.
