= Tshepo Motaung =

South African cricketer (born 1999)

Personal information
- Born: 9 August 1993 (age 33)
- Source: ESPNcricinfo, 9 October 2016

Tshepo Motaung (born 9 August 1999) is a South African cricketer. He made his List A debut for Easterns in the 2016–17 CSA Provincial One-Day Challenge on 9 October 2016 and his first-class debut for Easterns in the 2016–17 Sunfoil 3-Day Cup on 6 October 2016.
