= Okuhle Cele =

South African cricketer (born 1997)

Personal information
- Full name: Okuhle Abonga Cele
- Born: 9 July 1997 (age 29); Durban, KwaZulu-Natal South Africa
- Batting: Right-handed
- Bowling: Right-arm fast
- Role: Bowler
- Relatives: Andile Phehlukwayo (cousin)

Domestic team information
- Years: Team
- 2016/17–2019/20: KwaZulu-Natal Coastal
- 2017/18–2019/20: Dolphins
- 2018: Durban Heat
- 2020/21: Titans
- 2021/22–present: Northerns
- 2025: Sunrisers Eastern Cape

Career statistics
Competition	FC	LA	T20
Matches	46	36	32
Runs scored	153	32	12
Batting average	6.12	10.66	12.00
100s/50s	0/0	0/0	0/0
Top score	20	13*	5*
Balls bowled	6,551	1,483	603
Wickets	123	47	33
Bowling average	30.17	29.55	23.90
5 wickets in innings	1	0	0
10 wickets in match	0	0	0
Best bowling	5/38	4/30	4/13
Catches/stumpings	10/–	4/–	7/–
- Source: ESPNcricinfo, 9 April 2025

Okuhle Cele (born 9 July 1997) is a South African cricketer. He currently plays for Northerns.

Cele made his Twenty20 debut for KwaZulu-Natal against Boland in the 2016 Africa T20 Cup on 23 September 2016. He made his first-class debut for KwaZulu-Natal in the 2016–17 Sunfoil 3-Day Cup on 6 October 2016. He made his List A debut for KwaZulu-Natal in the 2016–17 CSA Provincial One-Day Challenge on 9 October 2016. In October 2018, he was named in Durban Heat's squad for the first edition of the Mzansi Super League T20 tournament.

In January 2021, Cele was named in South Africa's Twenty20 International (T20I) squad for their series against Pakistan. In April 2021, he was named in Northerns' squad, ahead of the 2021–22 cricket season in South Africa.
