= Matthew Arnold (cricketer) =

South African cricketer (born 1988)

Personal information
- Born: 16 October 1988 (age 38); Durban, South Africa
- Source: Cricinfo, 6 September 2015

Matthew Arnold (born 16 October 1988) is a South African cricketer. He was included in the Gauteng cricket team squad for the 2015 Africa T20 Cup.

He was the leading wicket-taker in the 2017–18 CSA Provincial One-Day Challenge tournament for Easterns, with 14 dismissals in nine matches.

In September 2018, he was named in Easterns' squad for the 2018 Africa T20 Cup. In September 2019, he was named as the vice-captain of Easterns' squad for the 2019–20 CSA Provincial T20 Cup. In April 2021, he was named in Easterns' squad, ahead of the 2021–22 cricket season in South Africa.
