= Thomas Mokorosi =

South African cricketer (born 1981)

Personal information
- Full name: Thomas Chobokoane Mokorosi
- Born: 9 February 1981 (age 45); Maseru, South Africa

Umpiring information
- WODIs umpired: 4 (2017–2024)
- WT20Is umpired: 5 (2023–2024)
- Source: Cricinfo, 2 February 2023

Thomas Mokorosi (born 9 February 1981) is a South African cricket umpire. He has stood in matches in the 2016–17 Sunfoil 3-Day Cup and the 2016–17 CSA Provincial One-Day Challenge tournaments. He is part of Cricket South Africa's umpire panel for first-class matches.
