= Kofi Apea-Adu =

South African cricketer (born 1995)

Personal information
- Born: 3 March 1995 (age 31); Polokwane, South Africa
- Source: ESPNcricinfo, 8 October 2016

Kofi Apea-Adu (born 3 March 1995) is a South African cricketer. He made his first-class debut for Easterns in the 2014–15 Sunfoil 3-Day Cup on 27 November 2014.
