= Clayton August =

South African cricketer (born 1990)

Clayton August (born 16 February 1990) is a South African cricketer. He is a left-handed batsman and a left-arm fast-medium bowler who played for Boland. He was born in Vredenburg.

August made a single first-class appearance during the 2006–07 season, in which, as a tailender, he did not bat, but bowled five overs, taking match figures of 0–12. August was a part of the South African Under-19 World Cup squad in 2007–08, and played two games in the competition, his first act in the competition being to bowl out Namibian opening batsman Raymond van Schoor.

August has played for Boland Under-19s since the opening of the 2008–09 season. He was included in the Easterns cricket team squad for the 2015 Africa T20 Cup. He was also the leading wicket-taker in the 2017–18 Sunfoil 3-Day Cup tournament, with 41 dismissals in ten matches.

In September 2018, he was named in Easterns' squad for the 2018 Africa T20 Cup. He was the leading wicket-taker in the 2019–20 CSA 3-Day Provincial Cup, with 39 dismissals in nine matches. In April 2021, he was named in Easterns' squad, ahead of the 2021–22 cricket season in South Africa.
