= Jerry Nqolo =

South African cricketer (born 1991)

Personal information
- Born: 23 July 1991 (age 35); Alice, South Africa
- Source: Cricinfo, 1 September 2015

Jerry Nqolo (born 23 July 1991) is a South African cricketer. He was included in the Border cricket team squad for the 2015 Africa T20 Cup. In August 2018, he was named in Border's squad for the 2018 Africa T20 Cup. In April 2021, he was named in Border's squad, ahead of the 2021–22 cricket season in South Africa.
