= Siphelele Gasa =

South African cricket umpire (born 1984)

Personal information
- Born: 29 February 1984 (age 42); Pretoria, South Africa

Umpiring information
- T20Is umpired: 6 (2025)
- WODIs umpired: 7 (2018–2024)
- WT20Is umpired: 8 (2018–2024)
- Source: Cricinfo, 2 March 2017

Siphelele Gasa (born 29 February 1984) is a South African cricket umpire. He has stood in matches in the 2016–17 Sunfoil 3-Day Cup and the 2016–17 CSA Provincial One-Day Challenge tournaments. He is part of Cricket South Africa's umpire panel for first-class matches.

== See also ==
- List of Twenty20 International cricket umpires
