= Brendon Louw =

South African cricketer (born 1991)

Personal information
- Full name: Brendon Ivan Louw
- Born: 15 November 1991 (age 34); Knysna, South Africa
- Batting: Left-handed
- Role: Wicket-keeper

Domestic team information
- Years: Team
- 2009/10–2019/20: South Western Districts
- 2011/12–2014/15: Warriors
- 2019: North West Warriors
- 2020/21: Western Province
- 2020/21: Cape Cobras

Career statistics
Competition	FC	LA	T20
Matches	113	74	37
Runs scored	4,676	1,269	361
Batting average	28.51	22.66	12.03
100s/50s	4/27	0/4	0/0
Top score	167	89	36
Balls bowled	162	132	–
Wickets	2	7	–
Bowling average	48.00	10.85	–
5 wickets in innings	0	0	–
10 wickets in match	0	0	–
Best bowling	2/33	3/15	–
Catches/stumpings	320/12	71/7	16/6
- Source: ESPNcricinfo, 21 May 2021

Brendon Ivan Louw (born 15 November 1991) is a South African cricketer and coach. He was included in the South Western Districts cricket team for the 2015 Africa T20 Cup. In September 2018, he was named in South Western Districts' squad for the 2018 Africa T20 Cup. In 2025, he became the head coach of the Brazil national side.
