= Tladi Bokako =

South African cricketer (born 1993)

Personal information
- Full name: Tladi Bokako
- Born: 21 April 1993 (age 33); Motherwell, Port Elizabeth, South Africa
- Batting: Right-handed
- Bowling: Right-arm fast
- Role: Bowler

Domestic team information
- Years: Team
- 2012/13–2017/18: Eastern Province
- 2016/17–2017/18: Warriors
- 2018/19–2019/20: South Western Districts
- 2018/19–2019/20: Cape Cobras
- 2018: Durban Heat
- 2019/20: Western Province
- 2020/21: Lions
- 2021/22–present: Gauteng

Career statistics
Competition	FC	LA	T20
Matches	64	30	44
Runs scored	665	96	29
Batting average	8.98	8.72	4.83
100s/50s	0/1	0/0	0/0
Top score	56	28	8*
Balls bowled	9,010	1,157	794
Wickets	195	23	33
Bowling average	26.80	43.95	32.75
5 wickets in innings	6	0	0
10 wickets in match	0	0	0
Best bowling	6/12	3/30	3/40
Catches/stumpings	20/–	8/–	8/–
- Source: ESPNcricinfo, 6 February 2023

Tladi Bokako (born 21 April 1993) is a South African cricketer. He was included in the Eastern Province cricket team squad for the 2015 Africa T20 Cup. In June 2018, he was named in the squad for the Cape Cobras team for the 2018–19 season.

In September 2018, he was named in South Western Districts' squad for the 2018 Africa T20 Cup. The following month, he was named in Durban Heat's squad for the first edition of the Mzansi Super League T20 tournament. In April 2021, he was named in Gauteng's squad, ahead of the 2021–22 cricket season in South Africa.
