= Gihahn Cloete =

South African cricketer

Personal information
- Full name: Gihahn Love Cloete
- Born: 4 October 1992 (age 34); Atlantis, Cape Province, South Africa
- Batting: Left-handed
- Bowling: Right-arm offbreak
- Role: Wicket-keeper

International information
- National side: South Africa
- T20I debut (cap 60): 9 October 2018 v Zimbabwe
- Last T20I: 1 February 2019 v Pakistan

Career statistics
Competition	T20I	First-class
Matches	2	115
Runs scored	15	5,889
Batting average	7.5	30.9
100s/50s	0/0	0/0
Top score	13	135
Balls bowled	–	45
Wickets	–	1
Bowling average	–	30.0
5 wickets in innings	–	0
10 wickets in match	–	0
Best bowling	–	1/11
Catches/stumpings	0/–	128/–
- Source: Cricinfo, 27 November 2020

Gihahn Cloete (born 4 October 1992) is a South African cricketer. He made his international debut for the South Africa cricket team in October 2018.

== Domestic career ==
Cloete was included in the Eastern Province cricket team squad for the 2015 Africa T20 Cup. In August 2018, he was named in Border's squad for the 2018 Africa T20 Cup.

In October 2018, Cloete was named in Tshwane Spartans' squad for the first edition of the Mzansi Super League T20 tournament. He was the leading run-scorer for the team in the tournament, with 330 runs in ten matches. In April 2021, he was named in Northerns' squad, ahead of the 2021–22 cricket season in South Africa.

== International career ==
In September 2018, Cloete was named in South Africa's Twenty20 International (T20I) series against Zimbabwe. He made his T20I debut for South Africa against Zimbabwe on 9 October 2018.
