= Lutho Sipamla =

South African cricketer (born 1998)

Personal information
- Born: 12 May 1998 (age 28); Port Elizabeth, Eastern Cape, South Africa
- Batting: Right-handed
- Bowling: Right-arm medium-fast

International information
- National side: South Africa (2019–present)
- Test debut (cap 346): 26 December 2020 v Sri Lanka
- Last Test: 25 February 2022 v New Zealand
- ODI debut (cap 134): 4 February 2020 v England
- Last ODI: 7 April 2021 v Pakistan
- T20I debut (cap 80): 3 February 2019 v Pakistan
- Last T20I: 15 November 2024 v India

Career statistics
Competition	Test	ODI	T20I	FC
Matches	3	5	13	62
Runs scored	15	14	13	429
Batting average	5.00	–	4.33	7.39
100s/50s	0/0	0/0	0/0	0/0
Top score	10*	10*	8*	36
Balls bowled	419	182	260	8,633
Wickets	11	2	10	192
Bowling average	22.27	86.00	45.20	26.31
5 wickets in innings	0	0	0	6
10 wickets in match	0	0	0	0
Best bowling	4/76	1/40	2/22	6/34
Catches/stumpings	2/–	1/–	3/–	26/–
- Source: Cricinfo, 11 December 2025

Lutho Sipamla (born 12 May 1998) is a South African professional cricketer who plays domestic cricket for Gauteng. He made his international debut for the South Africa cricket team in February 2019.

== Domestic career ==
He made his first-class debut for Eastern Province in the 2016–17 Sunfoil 3-Day Cup on 5 January 2017. Prior to his debut, he was named in South Africa's squad for the 2016 Under-19 Cricket World Cup. He made his List A debut for Eastern Province in the 2016–17 CSA Provincial One-Day Challenge on 12 February 2017.

In September 2018, he was named in Eastern Province's squad for the 2018 Africa T20 Cup. He made his Twenty20 debut for Eastern Province in the 2018 Africa T20 Cup on 14 September 2018.

In October 2018, he was named in Tshwane Spartans' squad for the first edition of the Mzansi Super League T20 tournament. He was the joint-leading wicket-taker for the team in the tournament, with sixteen dismissals in ten matches. In August 2019, he was named the Mzansi Super League Young Player of the Year at Cricket South Africa's annual award ceremony.

In September 2019, he was named in the squad for the Tshwane Spartans team for the 2019 Mzansi Super League tournament. In April 2021, he was named in Gauteng's squad, ahead of the 2021–22 cricket season in South Africa.

== International career ==
In July 2018, he was named in the Cricket South Africa Emerging Squad. In January 2019, he was named in South Africa's Twenty20 International (T20I) squad for their series against Pakistan. He made his T20I debut for South Africa against Pakistan on 3 February 2019. In January 2020, he was named in South Africa's One Day International (ODI) squad for their series against England. He made his ODI debut on 4 February 2020, for South Africa against England.

In December 2020, Sipamla was added to South Africa's Test squad for their series against Sri Lanka. He made his Test debut for South Africa, against Sri Lanka, on 26 December 2020.
