= Janneman Malan =

South African cricketer (born 1996)

Personal information
- Full name: Janneman Nieuwoudt Malan
- Born: 18 April 1996 (age 30); Nelspruit, Mpumalanga, South Africa
- Batting: Right-handed
- Bowling: Right-arm leg break
- Role: Batter
- Relatives: Andre Malan (brother); Pieter Malan (brother)

International information
- National side: South Africa (2019–2022)
- ODI debut (cap 137): 29 February 2020 v Australia
- Last ODI: 11 October 2022 v India
- ODI shirt no.: 82
- T20I debut (cap 79): 3 February 2019 v Pakistan
- Last T20I: 22 July 2021 v Ireland

Domestic team information
- Years: Team
- 2015/16–2017/18: North West
- 2017/18: Lions
- 2018/19: Western Province
- 2018/19–2020/21: Cape Cobras
- 2018–2019: Cape Town Blitz
- 2021/22–present: Boland
- 2023: Joburg Super Kings

Career statistics
Competition	ODI	T20I	FC	LA
Matches	23	11	57	97
Runs scored	958	241	3974	3892
Batting average	47.9	21.9	43.19	44.22
100s/50s	3/4	0/1	13/15	8/25
Top score	177*	55	208*	177*
Catches/stumpings	11/0	3/0	64/0	49/0
- Source: ESPNcricinfo, 7 January 2024

Janneman Nieuwoudt Malan (born 18 April 1996) is a South African cricketer. He made his international debut for the South Africa cricket team in February 2019.

== Domestic and T20 career ==
Malan was included in the North West squad for the 2016 Africa T20 Cup. In August 2017, he was named in Bloem City Blazers' squad for the first season of the T20 Global League. However, in October 2017, Cricket South Africa initially postponed the tournament until November 2018, with it being cancelled soon after.

Malan was the leading run-scorer in the 2017–18 CSA Provincial One-Day Challenge tournament, with 500 runs in ten matches. He was also the leading run-scorer in the 2017–18 Sunfoil 3-Day Cup tournament, with 1,046 runs in ten matches.

In June 2018, Malan was named in the squad for the Cape Cobras team for the 2018–19 season. In September 2018, he was named in Western Province's squad for the 2018 Africa T20 Cup. He was the leading run-scorer for Western Province in the tournament, with 178 runs in four matches.

In October 2018, Malan was named in Cape Town Blitz's squad for the first edition of the Mzansi Super League T20 tournament. In September 2019, he was named in the squad for the Cape Town Blitz team for the 2019 Mzansi Super League tournament. In April 2021, he was named in Boland's squad, ahead of the 2021–22 cricket season in South Africa.

In April 2021, Malan was signed by Islamabad United to play in the rescheduled matches in the 2021 Pakistan Super League. In July 2022, he was signed by the Galle Gladiators for the third edition of the Lanka Premier League.

In September 2022 Malan was bought in the SA20 player auction by the Johannesburg Super Kings for the inaugural 2023 season.

== International career ==
In February 2019, Malan was added to South Africa's Twenty20 International (T20I) squad for the series against Pakistan, after Quinton de Kock was ruled out of the fixtures due to an injury. He made his T20I debut for South Africa against Pakistan on 3 February 2019.

In January 2020, Malan was named in South Africa's One Day International (ODI) squad for their series against England. The following month, he was also named in South Africa's ODI squad for their series against Australia. He made his ODI debut for South Africa, against Australia, on 29 February 2020, but was dismissed for a golden duck. However, in his next match, Malan scored an unbeaten 129 runs, his maiden ODI century, as South Africa beat Australia by six wickets.

On 16 July 2021, against Ireland in the third ODI, Malan scored an unbeaten 177, the fourth-highest individual score by a batsman for South Africa in ODI cricket. He also shared a partnership of 225 runs with Quinton de Kock.

In the annual ICC Awards in January 2022, Malan was named in the ICC Men's ODI Team of the Year for the year 2021. He was also named as the ICC Emerging Men's Cricketer of the Year.
