= Tshepo Ntuli =

South African cricketer (born 1995)

Personal information
- Born: 15 November 1995 (age 30)
- Source: ESPNcricinfo, 7 September 2016

Tshepo Ntuli (born 15 November 1995) is a South African first-class cricketer. He was included in the Free State squad for the 2016 Africa T20 Cup. In April 2021, Ntuli was named in the South Africa Emerging Men's squad for their six-match tour of Namibia. Later the same month, he was named in Gauteng's squad, ahead of the 2021–22 cricket season in South Africa. In May 2025, he was in controversy for a physical altercation with Bangladeshi player Ripon Mondol while playing first class tour to Bangladesh.
