= 2023–24 CSA 4-Day Series =

Cricket tournament

- Dates: 26 October 2023 – 3 March 2024
- Administrator: Cricket South Africa
- Cricket format: First-class
- Tournament format: Single round-robin
- Champions: Div 1: Lions (4th title); Div 2: Northern Cape (1st title)
- Participants: 15
- Matches: 51
- Most runs: Div 1: Marques Ackerman (571); Div 2: Blayde Capell (781)
- Most wickets: Div 1: Bjorn Fortuin (35); Div 2: Jade de Klerk (34)

The 2023–24 CSA 4-Day Series is a first-class cricket competition took place in South Africa from 26 October 2023 to 3 March 2024. It was the 3rd edition of the post-franchise era and retained the two-division league format introduced the previous year. The competing teams in each division were different for the first time since the 2021–22 adoption of the provisional format, with KwaZulu-Natal Inland being promoted to Division 1 and Knights being relegated to Division 2 based on their performances across all formats in the previous two years. 2023–24 will be the first season to have promotion and relegation based on teams' performances across formats in just that one season.

The Division 2 teams of Limpopo and Mpumalanga were re-awarded first-class status in October 2022. Therefore, unlike the previous season, all matches played in the competition would have first-class status.

== Teams ==
Division One
Team	Location	Capacity	Province
Boland	Boland Park, Paarl	10,000	Western Cape
Dolphins	Kingsmead, Durban	25,000	KwaZulu-Natal
Lions	Wanderers Stadium, Johannesburg	34,000	Gauteng
KwaZulu-Natal (Inland)	City Oval, Pietermaritzburg	12,000	KwaZulu-Natal
North West Dragons	Absa Puk Oval, Potchefstroom	18,000	North West
Titans	Centurion Park, Centurion, South Africa	22,000	Gauteng
Warriors	St George's Park, Gqeberha	19,000	Eastern Cape
Western Province	Newlands, Cape Town	25,000	Western Cape

Division Two
Team	Location	Capacity	Province
Border	Buffalo Park, East London	20,000	Eastern Cape
Easterns	Willowmoore Park, Benoni	20,000	Gauteng
Knights	Mangaung Oval, Bloemfontein	20,000	Free State
Limpopo	Polokwane Cricket Club, Polokwane		Limpopo
Mpumalanga	Uplands College, White River		Mpumalanga
Northern Cape	De Beers Diamond Oval, Kimberley	11,000	Northern Cape
South Western Districts	Recreation Ground, Oudtshoorn		Western Cape

== Points Table ==
=== Division 1 Standings ===
Pos	Team	Pld	W	D	L	Pts	Qualification
1	Lions	7	3	3	1	119.36	Advance to the Final
2	Western Province	7	4	1	2	118.56	Advance to the Final
3	Titans	7	3	2	2	108.54	
4	Dolphins	7	2	4	1	106.56	
5	Warriors	7	2	3	2	98.04	
6	North West	7	2	2	3	92	
7	Boland	7	1	3	3	76.96	
8	KwaZulu-Natal (Inland)	7	0	4	3	57.26	

Source: ESPNcricinfo

=== Division 2 Standings ===
Pos	Team	Pld	W	D	L	Pts	Qualification
1	Northern Cape	6	3	2	1	105.26	Advance to the Final
2	Knights	6	3	1	2	98.66	Advance to the Final
3	Limpopo	6	3	1	2	91.92	
4	Border	6	2	2	2	83.64	
5	South Western Districts	6	2	1	3	80.38	
6	Easterns	6	2	1	3	75.76	
7	Mpumalanga	6	1	2	3	63.92	

Source: ESPNcricinfo
Rules for classification: Points system: 16 for a win, 8 for a tie, 6 for a draw.
- Batting bonus points: in the first innings only, 1 point for reaching 150 runs, then 0.02 points for each run thereafter.
- Bowling bonus points: in the first innings only, 1 point for taking three wickets, then 1 point for each two wickets thereafter.

== Division 1 Fixtures ==
=== Round 1 ===
4–7 November 2023
Scorecard

Boland	v	Titans
268 (97.5 overs); Shaun von Berg 67 (135); Dayyaan Galiem 4/54 (20.5 overs)		209 (72.4 overs); Dewald Brevis 50 (113); Siyabonga Mahima 5/59 (18.4 overs)
197 (82.3 overs); Clyde Fortuin 65 (156); Dayyaan Galiem 3/43 (15 overs)		260/4 (87.3 overs); Dean Elgar 119* (232); Siyabonga Mahima 1/52 (18.3 overs)

Titans won by 6 wickets
Boland Park, Paarl
Umpires: Arno Jacobs and Allahudien Paleker
Player of the match: Dean Elgar (Titans)

- Boland won the toss and elected to bat.
- Points: Titans 22.18, Boland 7.36
- Maahir Joseph (Boland) made his first-class debut.

4–7 November 2023
Scorecard

Lions	v	Western Province
402 (117.4 overs); Mitchell Van Buuren 170 (260); Beuran Hendricks 3/69 (21 overs)		271 (75.1 overs); Kyle Simmonds 120 (155); Duanne Olivier 5/66 (17 overs)
249/5d (74 overs); Ryan Rickelton 112* (186); Nandre Burger 3/38 (14 overs)		274 (85.3 overs); Kyle Verreynne 68 (113); Bjorn Fortuin 5/86 (30 overs)

Lions won by 106 runs
Newlands, Cape Town
Umpires: Lubabalo Gcuma and Abdoellah Steenkamp
Player of the match: Mitchell Van Buuren (Lions)

- Western Province won the toss and elected to field.
- Points: Lions 24.6, Western Province 5.42
- Sello Kitime (Western Province) made his first-class debut.

4–6 November 2023
Scorecard

Dolphins	v	KwaZulu-Natal Inland
404/8d (122 overs); Tshepang Dithole 146 (274); Mbulelo Budaza 3/54 (17 overs)		113 (51.4 overs); Dilivio Ridgaard 31 (72); JJ Smuts 6/47 (24.4 overs)
		230 (87.5 overs) (f/o); Keith Dudgeon 70 (183); Okuhle Cele 4/43 (15 overs)

Dolphins won by an innings and 61 runs
Kingsmead, Durban
Umpires: Bongani Jele and Dennis Smith
Player of the match: Tshepang Dithole (Dolphins)

- Dolphins won the toss and elected to bat.
- Points: Dolphins 24.24, KwaZulu-Natal Inland 2
- Teeshan Naicker and Sean Gibson (both KwaZulu-Natal Inland) made their first-class debuts.

4–7 November 2023
Scorecard

North West	v	Warriors
426/9d (116.4 overs); Migael Pretorius 109* (114); Alfred Mothoa 3/43 (16.3 overs)		240 (90.2 overs); Rudi Second 67 (130); Duan Jansen 5/31 (16 overs)
		214/3 (65 overs) (f/o); Jordan Hermann 111* (181); Duan Jansen 1/15 (8 overs)

Match drawn
Absa Puk Oval, Potchefstroom
Umpires: Siphelele Gasa and Stephen Harris
Player of the match: Migael Pretorius (North West)

- North West won the toss and elected to bat.
- Points: North West 13.84, Warriors 11.8
- Meeka-eel Prince (North West) made his first-class debut.

=== Round 2 ===
11–13 November 2023
Scorecard

Boland	v	Warriors
255 (76.2 overs); Hardus Viljoen 73 (113); Beyers Swanepoel 3/41 (18 overs)		227 (62.1 overs); Rudi Second 57 (99); Hardus Viljoen 4/59 (18.1 overs)
137 (36.1 overs); Janneman Malan 33 (45); Beyers Swanepoel 4/21 (11.1 overs)		166/2 (37.5 overs); Jordan Hermann 80* (108); Akhona Mnyaka 1/21 (4 overs)

Warriors won by 8 wickets
St George's Park, Gqeberha
Umpires: Abongile Sodumo and Philip Vosloo
Player of the match: Hardus Viljoen (Boland)

- Boland won the toss and elected to bat.
- Points: Warriors 22.54, Boland 7.1

11–14 November 2023
Scorecard

KwaZulu-Natal (Inland)	v	Western Province
400 (136.4 overs); Keith Dudgeon 69* (79); Kyle Simmonds 6/129 (50 overs)		204/0 (46 overs); Edward Moore 112* (164); Tian Koekemoer 0/3 (2 overs)

Match drawn
City Oval, Pietermaritzburg
Umpires: Thomas Mokorosi and Brad White

- KwaZulu-Natal Inland won the toss and elected to bat.
- Points: Western Province 10.08, KwaZulu-Natal Inland 9.14

11–14 November 2023
Scorecard

Dolphins	v	Titans
293 (85.5 overs); Slade van Staden 70 (101); Merrick Brett 5/61 (19.5 overs)		409 (114 overs); Dean Elgar 149 (282); Okuhle Cele 4/103 (28 overs)
322 (96 overs); Slade van Staden 93 (136); Junior Dala 4/66 (19 overs)		136/4 (35 overs); Dewald Brevis 58* (58); Okuhle Cele 2/48 (12 overs)

Match drawn
Centurion Park, Centurion
Umpires: Lauren Agenbag and Allahudien Paleker

- Dolphins won the toss and elected to bat.
- Points: Titans 15.24, Dolphins 12.86
- Merrick Brett (Titans) took his maiden five-wicket haul in first-class cricket.

13–16 November 2023
Scorecard

Lions	v	North West
504/5d (118.2 overs); Wiaan Mulder 121 (131); Ruan de Swardt 2/65 (19 overs)		345 (82.3 overs); Raynard van Tonder 87 (114); Duanne Olivier 3/78 (13.3 overs)
34/3 (5 overs); Ryan Rickelton 11 (4); Kerwin Mungroo 2/15 (2 overs)		238 (66 overs) (f/o); Migael Pretorius 72* (120); Bjorn Fortuin 4/32 (16 overs)

Match drawn
Wanderers Stadium, Johannesburg
Umpires: Mazizi Gampu and Bongani Jele
Player of the match: Wiaan Mulder (Lions)

- Lions won the toss and elected to bat.
- Points: Lions 15.64, North West 11.9

=== Round 3 ===
30 November – 3 December 2023
Scorecard

Dolphins	v	Boland
475/7d (135.1 overs); Jason Smith 147 (258); Siyabonga Mahima 4/133 (39.1 overs)		332 (135 overs); Aviwe Mgijima 132* (285); JJ Smuts 4/107 (51 overs)
176/8d (53.1 overs); Jason Smith 50* (83); Siyabonga Mahima 6/72 (26.1 overs)		108/2 (32 overs); Aviwe Mgijima 71* (77); Prenelan Subrayen 2/38 (13 overs)

Match drawn
Boland Park, Paarl
Umpires: Bongani Jele and Thomas Mokorosi

- Dolphins won the toss and elected to bat.
- Points: Dolphins 11.64, Boland 9.84

30 November – 3 December 2023
Scorecard

Western Province	v	Titans
350 (69.5 overs); Kyle Verreynne 150 (123); Ayabulela Gqamane 4/80 (12.5 overs)		259 (84.2 overs); Ayabulela Gqamane 54 (86); Mthiwekhaya Nabe 4/37 (15 overs)
365 (78 overs); Yaseen Vallie 110 (142); Dewald Brevis 3/84 (19 overs)		269 (91.2 overs); Donovan Ferreira 96 (144); Kyle Simmonds 4/91 (39 overs)

Western Province won by 187 runs
Newlands, Cape Town
Umpires: Allahudien Paleker and Dennis Smith
Player of the match: Kyle Verreynne (Western Province)

- Western Province won the toss and elected to bat.
- Points: Western Province 25, Titans 7.18

30 November – 2 December 2023
Scorecard

Warriors	v	Lions
402 (109.5 overs); Tristan Stubbs 130 (160); Wiaan Mulder 3/71 (23 overs)		108 (43 overs); Ryan Rickelton 41 (59); Renaldo Meyer 5/41 (12 overs)
169/7d (43.5 overs); Jiveshan Pillay 57 (125); Bjorn Fortuin 3/62 (14 overs)		158 (59.1 overs); Wiaan Mulder 38 (68); Patrick Kruger 3/22 (7 overs)

Warriors won by 305 runs
St George's Park, Gqeberha
Umpires: Ryan Hendricks and Philip Vosloo
Player of the match: Renaldo Meyer (Warriors)

- Warriors won the toss and elected to bat.
- Points: Warriors 25.4, Lions 3

30 November – 3 December 2023
Scorecard

North West	v	KwaZulu-Natal (Inland)
431 (91.5 overs); Lesiba Ngoepe 79 (84); Keith Dudgeon 6/102 (18 overs)		492 (152.5 overs); Ben Compton 170 (266); Migael Pretorius 5/99 (27 overs)
282/8d (96.2 overs); Senuran Muthusamy 82* (137); Malcolm Nofal 5/114 (35 overs)		106 (38.2 overs); Michael Erlank 43 (56); Wihan Lubbe 5/20 (9.2 overs)

North West won by 115 runs
Absa Puk Oval, Potchefstroom
Umpires: Jan Erasmus and Brad White

- KwaZulu-Natal Inland won the toss and elected to field.
- Points: North West 24.62, KwaZulu-Natal Inland 9
- Calvin King (North West) made his first-class debut.

=== Round 4 ===
14–16 December 2023
Scorecard

North West	v	Western Province
236 (64.3 overs); Migael Pretorius 83 (79); Mthiwekhaya Nabe 5/46 (11 overs)		345 (70.5 overs); George Linde 88 (112); Migael Pretorius 6/78 (20 overs)
181 (73.4 overs); Lesego Senokwane 49 (73); Kyle Simmonds 4/24 (19.4 overs)		73/2 (16.1 overs); Edward Moore 33 (41); Lesego Senokwane 1/15 (3.1 overs)

Western Province won by 8 wickets
Newlands, Cape Town
Umpires: Thomas Mokorosi and Philip Vosloo
Player of the match: Migael Pretorius (North West)

- North West won the toss and elected to bat.
- Points: Western Province 24.9, North West 6.72
- Wesley Bedja (Western Province) made his first-class debut.

14–17 December 2023
Scorecard

Dolphins	v	Lions
245/9d (70.2 overs); Marques Ackerman 140 (184); Codi Yusuf 6/49 (18.2 overs)		411/8d (147 overs); Bjorn Fortuin 100* (123); JJ Smuts 4/105 (47 overs)
190/3 (55 overs); Tshepang Dithole 93* (170); Codi Yusuf 1/30 (13 overs)

Match drawn
Kingsmead, Durban
Umpires: Jurie Sadler and Dennis Smith
Player of the match: Codi Yusuf (Lions)

- Dolphins won the toss and elected to bat.
- Points: Lions 13.56, Dolphins 11.9

14–17 December 2023
Scorecard

Boland	v	KwaZulu-Natal (Inland)
232 (87.1 overs); Keegan Petersen 57 (119); Kyle Nipper 3/44 (14 overs)		179 (71.3 overs); Tian Koekemoer 80 (155); Shaun von Berg 5/31 (17.3 overs)
178/9d (37.5 overs); Janneman Malan 55 (75); Keith Dudgeon 3/45 (9 overs)		104/5 (38 overs); Ben Compton 42 (88); Aviwe Mgijima 2/23 (12 overs)

Match drawn
City Oval, Pietermaritzburg
Umpires: Mazizi Gampu and Ryan Hendricks
Player of the match: Shaun von Berg (Boland)

- Boland won the toss and elected to bat.
- Points: Boland 12.64, KwaZulu-Natal Inland 11.58

14–17 December 2023
Scorecard

Titans	v	Warriors
383 (107.3 overs); Dewald Brevis 110 (172); Beyers Swanepoel 5/83 (26 overs)		460 (108 overs); Jiveshan Pillay 114 (194); Neil Brand 3/17 (4 overs)
326/9d (84.1 overs); Rivaldo Moonsamy 124 (141); Beyers Swanepoel 5/61 (17.1 overs)		236 (52.1 overs); Marco Jansen 57 (53); Gerald Coetzee 4/54 (13 overs)

Titans won by 13 runs
Centurion Park, Centurion
Umpires: Arno Jacobs and Andre Olivier
Player of the match: Beyers Swanepoel (Warriors)

- Titans won the toss and elected to bat.
- Points: Titans 24.06, Warriors 9.52
- Aphiwe Mnyanda (Warriors) made his first-class debut.
- Dewald Brevis (Titans) scored his maiden century in first-class cricket.

=== Round 5 ===
20–23 December 2023
Scorecard

Warriors	v	Dolphins
267 (83.4 overs); Rudi Second 65 (121); Daryn Dupavillon 3/49 (18 overs)		459/9d (125.3 overs); Sarel Erwee 112 (207); Siya Simetu 5/95 (23.3 overs)
284 (97 overs); Sinethemba Qeshile 100 (153); Daryn Dupavillon 3/27 (13 overs)		10/1 (2.5 overs); Tshepang Dithole 5 (8); Beyers Swanepoel 1/3 (1.5 overs)

Match drawn
Kingsmead, Durban
Umpires: Siphelele Gasa and Thomas Mokorosi
Player of the match: Sinethemba Qeshile (Warriors)

- Warriors won the toss and elected to bat.
- Points: Dolphins 14.64, Warriors 11.34

20–23 December 2023
Scorecard

KwaZulu-Natal (Inland)	v	Lions
345 (129.2 overs); Tian Koekemoer 90 (265); Bjorn Fortuin 3/65 (35 overs)		435 (112 overs); Mitchell Van Buuren 132 (262); Malcolm Nofal 3/86 (25 overs)
170 (70.2 overs); Ben Compton 57 (134); Duanne Olivier 4/30 (14.2 overs)		84/1 (14.2 overs); Muhammad Manack 45* (46); Keith Dudgeon 1/26 (4 overs)

Lions won by 9 wickets
Wanderers Stadium, Johannesburg
Umpires: Ryan Hendricks and Brad White
Player of the match: Mitchell Van Buuren (Lions)

- KwaZulu-Natal Inland won the toss and elected to bat.
- Points: Lions 23.68, KwaZulu-Natal Inland 6.56
- Muhammad Manack (Lions) made his first-class debut.

21–23 December 2023
Scorecard

Titans	v	North West
265 (78.3 overs); Dewald Brevis 113 (121); Senuran Muthusamy 5/79 (22.3 overs)		108 (49.2 overs); Lesego Senokwane 23 (55); Donovan Ferreira 6/38 (17.2 overs)
287/8d (52 overs); Rivaldo Moonsamy 98 (72); Senuran Muthusamy 3/93 (21 overs)		142 (45.4 overs); Tumelo Mokoena 50 (89); Neil Brand 4/35 (14 overs)

Titans won by 302 runs
Absa Puk Oval, Potchefstroom
Umpires: Arno Jacobs and Dennis Smith
Player of the match: Donovan Ferreira (Titans)

- Titans won the toss and elected to bat.
- Tumelo Mokoena (North West) made his first-class debut.
- Points: Titans 23.3, North West 4

27–30 December 2023
Scorecard

Western Province	v	Boland
355 (84.1 overs); Jonathan Bird 78 (143); Achille Cloete 4/67 (12 overs)		480 (156.4 overs); Aviwe Mgijima 105 (186); Mihlali Mpongwana 3/46 (16 overs)
196 (59.2 overs); Edward Moore 61 (113); Hardus Viljoen 6/53 (18.2 overs)		72/2 (11.4 overs); Pieter Malan 33* (39); Beuran Hendricks 1/26 (2.4 overs)

Boland won by 8 wickets
Boland Park, Paarl
Umpires: Mazizi Gampu and Lubabalo Gcuma
Player of the match: Hardus Viljoen (Boland)

- Western Province won the toss and elected to bat.
- Points: Boland 24.44, Western Province 7.1

=== Round 6 ===
14–17 February 2024
Scorecard

Western Province	v	Warriors
141 (42.4 overs); Gavin Kaplan 45 (53); Alfred Mothoa 4/32 (8.4 overs)		111 (31 overs); Patrick Kruger 34* (25); Wesley Bedja 5/19 (5 overs)
203 (59.1 overs); Tony de Zorzi 44 (111); Siya Simetu 3/29 (6.1 overs)		169 (57 overs); Jiveshan Pillay 101* (191); Onke Nyaku 3/27 (12.4 overs)

Western Province won by 64 runs
St George's Park, Gqeberha
Umpires: Arno Jacobs and Siphelele Gasa

- Western Province won the toss and elected to bat.
- Wesley Bedja (Warriors) took his maiden five-wicket haul in first-class cricket.
- Points: Western Province 20, Warriors 4

14–17 February 2024
Scorecard

KwaZulu-Natal	v	Titans
426 (159 overs); Yaseen Valli 124 (316); Dewald Brevis 4/65 (19 overs)		252/1 (70 overs); Matthew Kleinveldt 132 (210); Malcolm Nofal 1/49 (13 overs)

Match drawn
City Oval, Pietermaritzburg
Umpires: Abdoellah Steenkamp and Dennis Smith

- KwaZulu-Natal won the toss and elected to bat.
- Jared Meiring, Ntando Zuma (KwaZulu-Natal) and Schalk Engelbrecht (Warriors) all made their first-class debuts.
- Points: Titans 10.04, KwaZulu-Natal Inland 8.64

14–17 February 2024
Scorecard

Boland	v	Lions
226 (83.1 overs); Aviwe Mgijima 65 (90); Bjorn Fortuin 4/69 (25.1 overs)		478 (128.5 overs); Wiaan Mulder 141 (128); Hardus Viljoen 5/63 (29.5 overs)
475/9 (142 overs); Pieter Malan 162 (365); Codi Yusuf 3/99 (27 overs)

Match drawn
Wanderers Stadium, Johannesburg
Umpires: Abongile Sodumo and Lubabalo Gcuma
Player of the match: Pieter Malan (Boland)

- Boland won the toss and elected to bat.
- Nathan Engelbrecht (Boland) made his first-class debut.
- Points: Imperial Lions 15.02, Boland 9.52

14–17 February 2024
Scorecard

Dolphins	v	North West
643/8d (119.1 overs); Bryce Parsons 191 (179); Duan Jansen 3/72 (20.1 overs)		282 (87.5 overs); Lesiba Ngoepe 96 (122); Okuhle Cele 4/51 (17.5 overs)
8/0 (2.1 overs); Sarel Erwee 6* (7)		366 (101 overs) (f/o); Grant Mokoena 168 (314); Okuhle Cele 4/79 (20 overs)

Dolphins won by 10 wickets
Absa Puk Oval, Potchefstroom
Umpires: Ryan Hendricks and Stephen Harris

- Dolphins won the toss and elected to bat.
- Points: Dolphins 28.24, North West 5.64

=== Round 7 ===
21–24 February 2024
Scorecard

North West	v	Boland
484 (133.5 overs); Lesego Senokwane 137 (262); Shaun von Berg 3/100 (28.5 overs)		253 (88.5 overs); Shaun von Berg 62 (100); Duan Jansen 3/53 (17 overs)
		183 (70.2 overs); Michael Copeland 50* (98); Gideon Peters 5/48 (18.2 overs)

North West won by innings and 48 runs
Boland Park, Paarl
Umpires: Allahudien Paleker and Thomas Mokorosi

- North West won the toss and elected to bat.
- Jevano Baron (Boland) and Ronan Herrmann (North West) both made their first-class debuts.
- Gideon Peters (North West) took his maiden five-wicket haul in first-class cricket.
- Points: North West 25.28, Boland 6.06

21–23 February 2024
Scorecard

Western Province	v	Dolphins
592/6d (148.4 overs); Gavin Kaplan 173 (298); Prenelan Subrayen 4/86 (35.4 overs)		202 (55.1 overs); Marques Ackerman 45 (49); Beuran Hendricks 4/22 (13 overs)
		131 (37.4 overs); JJ Smuts 44* (60); Kyle Simmonds 7/39 (15.4 overs)

Western Province won by innings and 259 runs
Newlands, Cape Town
Umpires: Abdoellah Steenkamp and Brad White

- Western Province won the toss and elected to bat.
- Gavin Kaplan (Western Province) scored his maiden century in first-class cricket.
- Points: Western Province 26.06, Dolphins 3.04

21–24 February 2024
Scorecard

Warriors	v	KwaZulu-Natal
517/3d (127 overs); Tristan Stubbs 302* (372); Mondli Khumalo 3/92 (25 overs)		382/5 (112 overs); Michael Erlank 127 (229); Siya Simetu 2/89 (27 overs)

Match drawn
City Oval, Pietermaritzburg
Umpires: Abongile Sodumo and Mazizi Gampu

- Warriors won the toss and elected to bat.
- Points: Warriors 13.44, KwaZulu-Natal Inland 10.34

21–24 February 2024
Scorecard

Titans	v	Lions
227 (71.3 overs); Sibonelo Makhanya 66 (106); Lutho Sipamla 4/48 (12.3 overs)		293 (90.3 overs); Joshua Richards 107 (201); Junior Dala 6/58 (17.3 overs)
226 (73.5 overs); Sibonelo Makhanya 69 (102); Codi Yusuf 4/81 (21 overs)		164/5 (44.2 overs); Ryan Rickelton 64* (126); Junior Dala 3/64 (13.2 overs)

Lions won by 5 wickets
Centurion Park, Centurion
Umpires: Bongani Jele and Stephen Harris

- Titans won the toss and elected to bat.
- Points: Lions 23.86, Titans 6.54

== Division 2 Fixtures ==
=== Round 1 ===
26–29 October 2023
Scorecard

Northern Cape	v	Easterns
315 (102 overs); Grant Thomson 82 (114); Divan Posthumus 4/38 (22 overs)		200 (69.4 overs); Kabelo Sekhukhune 47 (82); Benjamin van Rensburg 5/37 (16 overs)
306/7d (86 overs); Jason Oakes 127 (192); Divan Posthumus 3/51 (15 overs)		250/6 (86.3 overs); Aron Visser 67* (184); Basheeru-Deen Walters 3/57 (19.3 overs)

Match drawn
Willowmoore Park, Benoni
Umpires: Jan Erasmus and Gladman Gaseba

- Northern Cape won the toss and elected to bat.
- Points: Northern Cape 14.18, Easterns 12
- Emanuel Motswiri (Northern Cape) made his first-class debut.
- Benjamin van Rensburg (Northern Cape) took his maiden five-wicket haul in first-class cricket.

2–5 November 2023
Scorecard

Limpopo	v	Knights
290 (93.1 overs); Ruan Haasbroek 116 (181); Nhlakanipho Mpungose 6/81 (16.1 overs)		622/7d (127 overs); Patrick Botha 212* (232); Morne Venter 2/93 (22 overs)
214 (82.4 overs); Louren Steenkamp 65 (142); Dane Piedt 5/55 (29.4 overs)

Knights won by an innings and 118 runs
Mangaung Oval, Bloemfontein
Umpires: Marlon Jansen and Warren Wyngaard

- Limpopo won the toss and elected to bat.
- Points: Knights 27.6, Limpopo 5.8
- Sello Sessing, Don Radebe, Daniel van der Merwe (Limpopo), and Dian Forrester (Knights) all made their first-class debut.
- Nhlakanipho Mpungose (Knights) took his maiden five-wicket haul in first-class cricket.

2–5 November 2023
Scorecard

South Western Districts	v	Border
440 (119 overs); Jean du Plessis 203 (316); Phaphama Fojela 4/68 (24 overs)		186 (60.5 overs); Jerome Bossr 51 (73); Thomas Kaber 5/58 (21.5 overs)
287/2d (73 overs); Blayde Capell 129* (218); Phaphama Fojela 1/41 (11 overs)		258 (102 overs); Jade de Klerk 60 (129); Thomas Kaber 5/91 (36 overs)

South Western Districts won by 283 runs
Recreation Ground, Oudtshoorn
Umpires: Andre Olivier and Godwin Von Willingh

- South Western Districts won the toss and elected to bat.
- Points: South Western Districts 26, Border 3.72
- Liabona Malife (South Western Districts) and Lihle Sizani (Border) both made their first-class debut.

=== Round 2 ===
9–12 November 2023
Scorecard

Knights	v	Northern Cape
467 (104.5 overs); Aubrey Swanepoel 105 (100); Grant Thomson 4/75 (20 overs)		233 (66.1 overs); Jason Oakes 98 (139); Monde Maqunqu 3/52 (14 overs)
321/4d (54.4 overs); Dian Forrester 127* (115); Ernest Kemm 2/52 (11 overs)		194 (82.5 overs); Grant Thomson 45 (88); Matthew Pollard 5/43 (19 overs)

Knights won by 361 runs
De Beers Diamond Oval, Kimberley
Umpires: Kerrin Klaaste and Jurie Sadler

- Knights won the toss and elected to bat.
- Points: Knights 27, Northern Cape 5.66
- Dian Forrester (Knights) scored his maiden century in first-class cricket.
- Matthew Pollard (Knights) took his maiden five-wicket haul in first-class cricket.

9–12 November 2023
Scorecard

Limpopo	v	Border
319 (100.1 overs); Sizwe Masondo 119 (252); Nico van Zyl 5/69 (26.1 overs)		273 (109.5 overs); Jason Niemand 106 (264); Eldred Hawken 5/60 (25 overs)
256/8d (75 overs); Louren Steenkamp 63 (115); Nico van Zyl 3/68 (17 overs)		224 (74.2 overs); Jason Niemand 82 (178); Maphekgola Pootona 4/29 (13.2 overs)

Limpopo won by 78 runs
Polokwane Cricket Club, Polokwane
Umpires: Roger Burne and Mthokozisi Shezi

- Limpopo won the toss and elected to bat.
- Points: Limpopo 23.38, Border 7.18
- Liam Peters (Limpopo) score his maiden century in first-class cricket.
- Nico van Zyl (Border) took his maiden five-wicket haul in first-class cricket.

=== Round 3 ===
16–19 November 2023
Scorecard

Mpumalanga	v	Border
383/9d (112.1 overs); Muhammed Mayet 96 (230); Jade de Klerk 3/71 (28 overs)		441 (102.3 overs); Marco Marais 148 (149); Hermann Rolfes 5/74 (22.3 overs)
320 (85.2 overs); Gareth Dukes 58 (54); Jade de Klerk 6/113 (34.2 overs)		106/3 (40.1 overs); Jason Niemand 29 (72); Alexander Kok 3/29 (14 overs)

Match drawn
Buffalo Park, East London
Umpires: Bongani Ntshebe and Khawulani Ntuli

- Border won the toss and elected to field.
- Points: Border 15.46, Mpumalanga 14.88
- Hermann Rolfes (Mpumalanga) and Keeran Forbes (Border) both made their first-class debut.
- Jerome Bossr (Border) scored his maiden century in first-class cricket.
- Hermann Rolfes (Mpumalanga) took his maiden five-wicket haul in first-class cricket.

23–26 November 2023
Scorecard

Easterns	v	South Western Districts
213 (59.2 overs); Shaylen Pillay 89 (169); Thomas Kaber 4/69 (19 overs)		330 (85.1 overs); Blayde Capell 179 (236); Chad Classen 4/59 (21.1 overs)
482/9d (119.4 overs); Shaylen Pillay 229* (344); Thomas Kaber 3/140 (37.4 overs)		261 (74 overs); Jhedli van Briesies 105* (174); Tumelo Simelane 4/109 (26 overs)

Easterns won by 104 runs
Recreation Ground, Oudtshoorn
Umpires: Andre Olivier and Jurie Sadler

- Easterns won the toss and elected to bat.
- Points: Easterns 22.26, South Western Districts 8.6
- Jhedli van Briesies (South Western Districts) scored his maiden century in first-class cricket.

23–26 November 2023
Scorecard

Limpopo	v	Mpumalanga
210 (73.5 overs); Liam Peters 55 (65); Akhulile Mkatu 2/22 (8 overs)		172 (51.2 overs); Benjamin van Niekerk 54* (80); Daniel van der Merwe 3/31 (9 overs)
419 (87 overs); Sizwe Masondo 201 (201); Gregory Mahlokwana 5/96 (21 overs)		400 (119 overs); Jurie Snyman 134 (131); Ruan Haasbroek 3/45 (21.1 overs)

Limpopo won by 57 runs
White River Country Club, White River
Umpires: Jan Erasmus and Gladman Gaseba

- Mpumalanga won the toss and elected to field.
- Points: Limpopo 22.2, Mpumalanga 5.44
- Artwell Mokgoloboto (Limpopo) made his first-class debut.
- Gregory Mahlokwana (Mpumalanga) took his maiden five-wicket haul in first-class cricket.

=== Round 4 ===
7–10 December 2023
Scorecard

Mpumalanga	v	Knights
267 (73.2 overs); Benjamin van Niekerk 64 (121); Nhlakanipho Mpungose 3/32 (7.2 overs)		74/0 (17 overs); Garnett Tarr 39* (57); Hermann Rolfes 0/4 (2 overs)

Match drawn
White River Country Club, White River
Umpires: Roger Burne and Roderick Ellis

- Knights won the toss and elected to field.
- No play was possible on the first, third, or fourth days due to rain.
- Points: Knights 10, Mpumalanga 9.34

14–17 December 2023
Scorecard

Easterns	v	Knights
389 (105 overs); Danie Rossouw 111 (181); Dian Forrester 2/45 (14 overs)		176 (61.5 overs); Tiaan van Vuuren 47 (78); Divan Posthumus 3/31 (12 overs)
26/1 (2.2 overs); Wesley Marshall 21* (8); Dian Forrester 1/5 (1 overs)		238 (68.5 overs) (f/o); Dian Forrester 125 (191); Chad Classen 3/56 (14 overs)

Easterns won by 9 wickets
Mangaung Oval, Bloemfontein
Umpires: Jan Erasmus and Warren Wyngaard

- Easterns won the toss and elected to bat.
- Points: Easterns 24.9, Knights 4.52
- Danie Rossouw (Easterns) scored his maiden first-class century.

=== Round 5 ===
15–17 December 2023
Scorecard

Mpumalanga	v	Northern Cape
185 (42.1 overs); Jurie Snyman 131 (124); Johannes van Dyk 5/40 (13 overs)		502 (153.4 overs); Ernest Kemm 168 (436); Yassar Cook 2/16 (3.4 overs)
221 (62 overs); Nhlanhla Dlamini 41 (110); Johannes van Dyk 5/30 (13 overs)

Northern Cape won by an innings and 96 runs
De Beers Diamond Oval, Kimberley
Umpires: Roger Burne and Marlon Jansen

- Mpumalanga won the toss and elected to bat.
- Points: Northern Cape 23.9, Mpumalanga 3.7
- Emanuel Motswiri (Northern Cape) scored his maiden century in first-class cricket.

20–23 December 2023
Scorecard

Limpopo	v	South Western Districts
475 (124.4 overs); Ruan Haasbroek 144 (178); Pheko Moletsane 3/59 (15.4 overs)		369 (106 overs); Jean du Plessis 156* (252); Eldred Hawken 4/68 (24 overs)
224/7d (58 overs); Ruan Haasbroek 83 (134); Khwezi Gumede 3/51 (16 overs)		328/6 (81 overs); Jhedli van Briesies 93* (104); Eldred Hawken 3/93 (23 overs)

Match drawn
Polokwane Cricket Club, Polokwane
Umpires: Khwaulani Ntuli and Warren Wyngaard

- South Western Districts won the toss and elected to field.
- Points: Limpopo 14.9, South Western Districts 12.82
- Alex Pillay (Limpopo) made his first-class debut.

=== Round 6 ===
11–14 January 2024
Scorecard

South Western Districts	v	Northern Cape
318 (87 overs); Pheko Moletsane 120 (157); Johannes van Dyk 3/54 (17 overs)		520 (152.2 overs); Grant Thomson 115 (101); Khwezi Gumede 3/79 (33.2 overs)
260 (81.5 overs); Jhedli van Briesies 122* (188); Tshepo Ntuli 4/89 (27 overs)		61/1 (15.3 overs); Ernest Kemm 41* (47); Pheko Moletsane 1/26 (7 overs)

Northern Cape won by 9 wickets
Diamond Oval, Kimberley
Umpires: Godwin Von Willingh and Warren Wyngaard

- South Western Districts won the toss and elected to bat.
- Pheko Moletsane (South Western Districts) scored his first century in first-class cricket.
- Points: Northern Cape 25.26, South Western Districts 5.36

11–14 January 2024
Scorecard

Limpopo	v	Easterns
157 (37.2 overs); Liam Peters 54 (49); Andrew Rasemene 3/33 (11 overs)		124 (34.2 overs); Kabelo Sekhukhune 22 (46); Jesse Albanie 5/55 (12.2 overs)
216 (68.5 overs); Liam Peters 119 (150); Chad Classen 3/60 (18 overs)		186 (60.4 overs); Divan Posthumus 34 (61); Jesse Albanie 5/53 (15.4 overs)

Limpopo won by 63 runs
Willowmoore Park, Benoni
Umpires: Andre Olivier and Gladman Gaseba

- Easterns won the toss and elected to field.
- Juan Lubbe (Easterns) made his first-class debut.
- Jesse Albanie (Limpopo) took his maiden five-wicket haul and maiden ten-wicket haul in first-class cricket.
- Points: Limpopo 21.14, Easterns 4

25–28 January 2024
Scorecard

Knights	v	Border
363 (81.2 overs); Gihahn Cloete 133 (160); Mathew Fourie 4/71 (18 overs)		483 (141 overs); Jerome Bossr 110 (188); Matthew Pollard 3/65 (26 overs)
235 (81 overs); Nathan Roux 61 (119); Jade de Klerk 7/99 (36 overs)		119/1 (31.2 overs); Jason Niemand 51 (80)

Border won by 9 wickets
Buffalo Park, East London
Umpires: Godwin Von Willingh and Roger Burne

- Border won the toss and elected to field.
- Points: Border 25.16, Knights 7.26

=== Round 7 ===
8–11 February 2024
Scorecard

Northern Cape	v	Border
527/5d (163.5 overs); Christopher Britz 201* (397); Jade de Klerk 3/156 (48.5 overs)		516/7d (166.5 overs); Marco Marais 133 (297); Tshepo Ntuli 2/111 (39 overs)

Match drawn
Buffalo Park, East London
Umpires: Godwin Von Willingh and Warren Wyngaard

- Northern Cape won the toss and elected to bat.
- Christopher Britz (Northern Cape) scored his maiden century in first-class cricket.
- Points: Border 12.12, Northern Cape 12.08

8–11 February 2024
Scorecard

South Western Districts	v	Knights
69 (32.1 overs); Blayde Capell 29 (35); Sithembile Langa 5/13 (9 overs)		215 (56.2 overs); Gihahn Cloete 81 (108); Thomas Kaber 3/31 (10 overs)
273 (70.2 overs); Jean du Plessis 56 (93); Tiaan van Vuuren 4/64 (22 overs)		129/1 (21.5 overs); Jacques Snyman 58 (44); Khwezi Gumede 1/43 (6.5 overs)

Knights won by 9 wickets
Mangaung Oval, Bloemfontein
Umpires: Jan Erasmus and Marlon Jansen

- South Western Districts won the toss and elected to bat.
- Points: Knights 22.28, South Western Districts 4

8–11 February 2024
Scorecard

Mpumalanga	v	Easterns
273 (95 overs); Hermann Rolfes 99 (177); Chad Classen 4/56 (21 overs)		193 (56.4 overs); Aron Visser 44 (92); Hermann Rolfes 3/31 (8.4 overs)
321/5d (68.2 overs); Jurie Snyman 200* (221); Andrew Rasemene 4/72 (17 overs)		108 (64.2 overs); Andrew Rasemene 28 (77); Hermann Rolfes 4/20 (13 overs)

Mpumalanga won by 293 runs
White River Country Club, White River
Umpires: Andre Olivier and Jurie Sadler

- Easterns won the toss and elected to field.
- Zuan Swart (Mpumalanga) and Jason van Dyk (Easterns) both made their first-class debuts.
- Points: Mpumalanga 23.46, Easterns 5.86

=== Round 8 ===
15–18 February 2024
Scorecard

Mpumalanga	v	South Western Districts
255 (79.5 overs); Benjamin van Niekerk 91 (108); Khwezi Gumede 4/72 (21 overs)		280 (73.1 overs); Blayde Capell 121 (160); Jon Hinrichsen 5/30 (17.1 overs)
280 (95.3 overs); Zuan Swart 92 (267); Khwezi Gumede 6/65 (24.3 overs)		258/7 (53.1 overs); Jhedli van Briesies 82 (80); Jon Hinrichsen 5/63 (14 overs)

South Western Districts won by 3 wickets
Recreation Ground, Oudtshoorn
Umpires: Andre Olivier and Lauren Agenbag

- South Western Districts won the toss and elected to field.
- Nevada Jacobs (South Western Districts) made his first-class debut.
- Khwezi Gumede (South Western Districts) took his maiden five-wicket haul and maiden ten-wicket haul in first-class cricket.
- Jon Hinrichsen (Mpumalanga) took his maiden ten-wicket haul in first-class cricket.
- Points: South Western Districts 23.6, Mpumalanga 7.1

15–18 February 2024
Scorecard

Easterns	v	Border
252 (104.5 overs); Danie Rossouw 55 (120); Nico van Zyl 3/58 (23.5 overs)		126 (51.5 overs); Marco Marais 55 (147); Kyle Landsberg 3/19 (9.5 overs)
141 (51.3 overs); Kyle Landsberg 36 (83); Thabile Hlatuka 5/31 (13 overs)		268/6 (91.4 overs); Marco Marais 80* (154); Andrew Rasemene 3/72 (20 overs)

Border won by 4 wickets
Willowmoore Park, Benoni
Umpires: Gladman Gaseba and Roger Burne

- Easterns won the toss and elected to bat.
- Dewan Marais, Kyle Landsberg (Easterns) and Thabile Hlatuka (Border) all made their first-class debuts.
- Thabile Hlatuka (Border) took his maiden five-wicket haul in first-class cricket.
- Points: Border 20, Easterns 6.74

15–18 February 2024
Scorecard

Limpopo	v	Northern Cape
275 (94 overs); Morne Venter 98 (222); Johannes van Dyk 4/50 (16 overs)		419 (135 overs); Hanu Viljoen 163 (345); Maphekgola Pootona 4/94 (24 overs)
283 (108.2 overs); Louren Steenkamp 97 (186); Johannes van Dyk 6/83 (26 overs)		141/5 (30 overs); Grant Thomson 43* (45); Eldred Hawken 2/18 (9 overs)

Northern Cape won by 5 wickets
Polokwane Cricket Club Ground, Polokwane
Umpires: Jan Erasmus and Mthokozisi Shezi

- Northern Cape won the toss and elected to field.
- Wisani Mushwana (Limpopo) made his first-class debut.
- Points: Northern Cape 24.18, Limpopo 4.5

== Finals ==
28 February – 3 March 2024
Division 1 Final
Scorecard

Lions	v	Western Province
225 (73 overs); Delano Potgieter 81 (106); Dane Paterson 5/31 (16 overs)		312 (84.3 overs); Daniel Smith 60 (117); Tshepo Moreki 5/65 (18.3 overs)
394 (124.2 overs); Delano Potgieter 155* (244); Mthiwekhaya Nabe 4/90 (25.2 overs)		208 (77.2 overs); Tony de Zorzi 55 (157); Bjorn Fortuin 5/69 (26 overs)

Lions won by 99 runs
Wanderers Stadium, Johannesburg
Umpires: Lubabalo Gcuma and Stephen Harris
Player of the match: Delano Potgieter (Lions)

- Western Province won the toss and elected to field.
- Tshepo Moreki (Lions) took his maiden five-wicket haul in first-class cricket.

24–28 February 2024
Division 2 Final
Scorecard

Knights	v	Northern Cape
330 (96.2 overs); Isaac Dikgale 122 (245); Basheeru-Deen Walters 4/50 (20 overs)		427 (115.5 overs); Jonathan Vandiar 92* (149); Monde Maqunqu 4/61 (16.5 overs)
222 (71.4 overs); Aubrey Swanepoel 47 (98); Basheeru-Deen Walters 4/44 (16.4 overs)		126/6 (30.3 overs); Ernest Kemm 44 (73); Monde Maqunqu 4/18 (7 overs)

Northern Cape won by 4 wickets
De Beers Diamond Oval, Kimberley
Umpires: Andre Olivier and Warren Wyngaard

- Northern Cape won the toss and elected to field.
