= 2017 Africa T20 Cup =

Cricket tournament

Africa T20 Cup
- Dates: 25 August – 25 September 2017
- Administrator: Cricket South Africa
- Cricket format: Twenty20
- Tournament format(s): Group stage, playoffs
- Host: South Africa
- Champions: KwaZulu-Natal Inland (1st title)
- Runners-up: Free State
- Participants: 16
- Matches: 27
- Most runs: Sarel Erwee (231)
- Most wickets: Wihan Lubbe (7); Nelson Odhiambo (7); Shadley van Schalkwyk (7)

The 2017 Africa T20 Cup was the third edition of the Africa T20 Cup, a Twenty20 cricket tournament. It was held in South Africa from 25 August to 25 September 2017, as a curtain-raiser to the 2017–18 South African domestic season. Organised by Cricket South Africa, it featured thirteen South African provincial teams, as well as national representative sides of Kenya, Namibia and Zimbabwe.

The sixteen participating teams were split into four pools of four, with the teams from each pool playing all of their matches at one ground across a single weekend. Defending champions Eastern Province were drawn in Pool B.

Namibia won all three games in Group A, progressing to the semi-finals of the tournament for the first time. Gauteng also progressed to the semi-finals for the first time, after winning Group B. They topped the table with a bonus-point win in their final group match, knocking out defending champions Eastern Province in the process. In Group C, Free State progressed, after beating Northern Cape by 62 runs in the final match of the group. KwaZulu-Natal Inland progressed from Group D after beating Border by six wickets in their final group fixture.

In the first semi-final, KwaZulu-Natal Inland beat Gauteng by 8 wickets to progress to the final. They were joined in the final with Free State, who beat Namibia by 10 wickets. Andries Gous scored a century, the second-ever in the Africa T20 Cup.

KwaZulu-Natal Inland won the tournament, beating Free State by 6 wickets in the final.

== Pool A ==
=== Squads ===
(South Africa) Easterns	Namibia	(South Africa) South Western Districts	(South Africa) Western Province
Kofi Apea-Adu; Matthew Arnold; Clayton August; Katleho Bala; Tumelo Bodibe; Wesley Coulentianos; Armandt Erasmus; Wesley Marshall; Sizwe Masondo; Tumelo Simelane; Jurie Snyman; Grant Thomson; Sizwe Zulu	Stephan Baard; Jean Bredenkamp; Sarel Burger; Petrus Burger; Gerhard Erasmus; Jan Frylinck; Lo-handre Louwrens; Tangeni Lungameni; Mika Mutumbe; Bernard Scholtz; JJ Smit; Eben van Wyk; Craig Williams	Mthobeli Bangindawo; Murray Commins; Justin Jordaan; Hanno Kotze; George Linde; Brendon Louw; Sammy Mofokeng; Dane Paterson; Obus Pienaar; Letlotlo Sesele; Daniel Sincuba; Glenton Stuurman; Todd Walker	Qaasim Adams; Michael Cohen; Dayyaan Galiem; Carlos Koyana; Michael Loubser; Aviwe Mgijima; Travis Muller; Mthiwekhaya Nabe; Mpilo Njoloza; Luke Philander; Emmanuel Sebareme; Jason Smith; Jean Strydom

=== Points table ===
Team	Pld	W	L	T	NR	Pts	NRR
Namibia	3	3	0	0	0	12	+0.621
(South Africa) South Western Districts	3	2	1	0	0	8	+0.192
(South Africa) Easterns	3	1	2	0	0	4	–0.125
(South Africa) Western Province	3	0	3	0	0	0	–0.733

=== Fixtures ===
25 August 2017
12:45
Scorecard

Western Province (South Africa); 121 (20 overs)	v	Namibia; 122/2 (18.2 overs)

Namibia won by 8 wickets
Willowmoore Park, Benoni

- Western Province won the toss and elected to bat.
- Petrus Burger (Namibia), Michael Cohen, Carlos Koyana, Luke Philander and Jean Strydom (Western Province) all made their T20 debuts.

25 August 2017
16:30
Scorecard

South Western Districts (South Africa); 146/5 (20 overs)	v	(South Africa) Easterns; 140/7 (20 overs)

South Western Districts won by 6 runs
Willowmoore Park, Benoni

- Easterns won the toss and elected to field.
- Katleho Bala, Tumelo Simelane, Sizwe Zulu (Easterns), Murray Commins and Todd Walker (South Western Districts) all made their T20 debuts.

26 August 2017
09:30
Scorecard

Western Province (South Africa); 121/5 (20 overs)	v	(South Africa) South Western Districts; 125/5 (17.5 overs)

South Western Districts won by 5 wickets
Willowmoore Park, Benoni

- South Western Districts won the toss and elected to field.
- Mthiwekhaya Nabe (Western Province) made his T20 debut.

26 August 2017
13:00
Scorecard

Easterns (South Africa); 149/4 (20 overs)	v	Namibia; 150/3 (18.3 overs)

Namibia won by 7 wickets
Willowmoore Park, Benoni

- Namibia won the toss and elected to field.

27 August 2017
09:30
Scorecard

South Western Districts (South Africa); 104/7 (20 overs)	v	Namibia; 105/4 (18.1 overs)

Namibia won by 6 wickets
Willowmoore Park, Benoni

- Namibia won the toss and elected to field.

27 August 2017
13:00
Scorecard

Easterns (South Africa); 163/8 (20 overs)	v	(South Africa) Western Province; 152 (18.2 overs)

Easterns won by 11 runs
Willowmoore Park, Benoni

- Western Province won the toss and elected to field.

== Pool B ==
=== Squads ===
(South Africa) Eastern Province	(South Africa) Gauteng	(South Africa) North West	(South Africa) Northerns
Tladi Bokako; Matthew Breetzke; Mathew Christensen; Jade de Klerk; Brad Dolley; Clyde Fortuin; Sisanda Magala; Edward Moore; Anrich Nortje; Solo Nqweni; Onke Nyaku; Kelly Smuts; David White	Nandre Burger; Stephen Cook; Yassar Cook; Tshepang Dithole; Matt McGillivray; Mangaliso Mosehle; Aaron Phangiso; Shaylen Pillay; Nono Pongolo; Delano Potgieter; Ryan Rickelton; Zaid Saloojee; Farhaan Sayanvala	Marques Ackerman; Craig Alexander; Brady Barends; Johannes Diseko; Bjorn Fortuin; Ruan Haasbroek; Wihan Lubbe; Andre Malan; Janneman Malan; Ayavuya Myoli; Kagiso Rapulana; Lesego Senokwane; Jovuan van Wyngaardt	Andrea Agathangelou; Roger Arendse; Corbin Bosch; Ruben Claassen; Tony de Zorzi; Rubin Hermann; Thomas Kaber; Lerato Kgoatle; Gregory Mahlokwana; Rivaldo Moonsamy; Luvuyo Nkese; Jiveshan Pillay; Migael Pretorius

=== Points table ===
Team	Pld	W	L	T	NR	Pts	NRR
(South Africa) Gauteng	3	2	1	0	0	10	+0.946
(South Africa) Eastern Province	3	2	1	0	0	9	+0.178
(South Africa) North West	3	1	2	0	0	5	+0.169
(South Africa) Northerns	3	1	2	0	0	4	–1.326

=== Fixtures ===
1 September 2017
12:45
Scorecard

Gauteng (South Africa); 140/6 (20 overs)	v	(South Africa) Eastern Province; 143/4 (19 overs)

Eastern Province won by 6 wickets
Senwes Park, Potchefstroom

- Eastern Province won the toss and elected to field.
- Matthew Breetzke (Eastern Province) and Ryan Rickelton (Gauteng) both made their T20 debuts.

1 September 2017
16:30
Scorecard

Northerns (South Africa); 145/8 (20 overs)	v	(South Africa) North West; 142/4 (20 overs)

Northerns won by 3 runs
Senwes Park, Potchefstroom

- Northerns won the toss and elected to bat.
- Ruan Haasbroek (North West), Gregory Mahlokwana, Luvuyo Nkese, Jiveshan Pillay and Migael Pretorius (Northerns) all made their T20 debuts.

2 September 2017
09:30
Scorecard

Northerns (South Africa); 141/3 (20 overs)	v	(South Africa) Gauteng; 142/2 (15.5 overs)

Gauteng won by 8 wickets
Senwes Park, Potchefstroom

- Northerns won the toss and elected to bat.
- Roger Arendse and Rubin Hermann (Northerns) both made their T20 debuts.

2 September 2017
13:00
Scorecard

North West (South Africa); 143/8 (20 overs)	v	(South Africa) Eastern Province; 102 (19.1 overs)

North West won by 41 runs
Senwes Park, Potchefstroom

- North West won the toss and elected to bat.
- Jade de Klerk (Eastern Province) made his T20 debut.

3 September 2017
09:30
Scorecard

Northerns (South Africa); 98 (19.2 overs)	v	(South Africa) Eastern Province; 101/3 (14 overs)

Eastern Province won by 7 wickets
Senwes Park, Potchefstroom

- Northerns won the toss and elected to bat.

3 September 2017
13:30
Scorecard

North West (South Africa); 128/6 (20 overs)	v	(South Africa) Gauteng; 129/4 (16 overs)

Gauteng won by 6 wickets
Senwes Park, Potchefstroom

- North West won the toss and elected to bat.

== Pool C ==
=== Squads ===
(South Africa) Free State	Kenya	(South Africa) KwaZulu-Natal	(South Africa) Northern Cape
Patrick Botha; Andries Gous; Loyiso Mdashe; Andrew Rasemene; Romano Terblanche; Diego Rosier; Shadley van Schalkwyk; Corné Dry; Tshepo Ntuli; Karabo Mogotsi; Sean Whitehead; Leus du Plooy; Raynard van Tonder	Rakep Patel; Irfan Karim; Shem Ngoche; Alex Obanda; Dhiren Gondaria; Nelson Odhiambo; Lucas Oluoch; Collins Obuya; Gurdeep Singh; Rushab Patel; Emmanuel Bundi; Pushpak Kerai; Peter Langat	Prenelan Subrayen; Jason Oakes; Khalipha Cele; Mishkal Ramsaroop; Vaughn van Jaarsveld; Jason Wagener; Calvin Savage; Smangaliso Nhlebela; Tyron Koen; Zakariya Paruk; Bruce Kerr; Dudu Zondo; Andile Mokgakane	Werner Coetsee; Aubrey Swanepoel; Patrick Kruger; Kagiso Mohale; Thandolwethu Mnyaka; Akhona Kula; Aidan Brooker; Grant Mokoena; Keegan Petersen; Richard Ntumka; Jacques Snyman; Mbulelo Budaza; Themba Maupa

=== Points table ===
Team	Pld	W	L	T	NR	Pts	NRR
(South Africa) Free State	3	2	1	0	0	10	+1.420
Kenya	3	2	1	0	0	8	–0.008
(South Africa) KwaZulu-Natal	3	1	2	0	0	5	–0.208
(South Africa) Northern Cape	3	1	2	0	0	4	–1.108

=== Fixtures ===
8 September 2017
12:45
Scorecard

Free State (South Africa); 147/7 (20 overs)	v	Kenya; 149/4 (18.2 overs)

Kenya won by 6 wickets
De Beers Diamond Oval, Kimberley

- Kenya won the toss and elected to field.
- Nealan van Heerden, Raynard van Tonder (Free State) and Pushpak Kerai (Kenya) all made their T20 debuts.

8 September 2017
16:30
Scorecard

KwaZulu-Natal (South Africa); 128/7 (20 overs)	v	(South Africa) Northern Cape; 129/4 (19.1 overs)

Northern Cape won by 6 wickets
De Beers Diamond Oval, Kimberley

- KwaZulu-Natal won the toss and elected to bat.
- Tyron Koen, Andile Mokgakane, Zakariya Paruk, Jason Wagener (KwaZulu-Natal) and Themba Maupa (Northern Cape) all made their T20 debuts.

9 September 2017
09:30
Scorecard

KwaZulu-Natal (South Africa); 120/7 (20 overs)	v	(South Africa) Free State; 122/1 (15.3 overs)

Free State won by 9 wickets
De Beers Diamond Oval, Kimberley

- Free State won the toss and elected to field.

9 September 2017
13:30
Scorecard

Northern Cape (South Africa); 148/5 (20 overs)	v	Kenya; 149/5 (18.4 overs)

Kenya won by 5 wickets
De Beers Diamond Oval, Kimberley

- Kenya won the toss and elected to field.

10 September 2017
09:30
Scorecard

KwaZulu-Natal (South Africa); 116 (19.4 overs)	v	Kenya; 92 (18.2 overs)

KwaZulu-Natal won by 24 runs
De Beers Diamond Oval, Kimberley

- Kenya won the toss and elected to field.

10 September 2017
13:30
Scorecard

Free State (South Africa); 139/6 (20 overs)	v	(South Africa) Northern Cape; 77 (16.4 overs)

Free State won by 62 runs
De Beers Diamond Oval, Kimberley

- Northern Cape won the toss and elected to field.
- Richard Ntumka (Northern Cape) made his T20 debut.

== Pool D ==
=== Squads ===
(South Africa) Boland	(South Africa) Border	(South Africa) KwaZulu-Natal Inland	Zimbabwe
Ferisco Adams; Cebo Tshiki; Justin Ontong; Simon Khomari; Niel Botha; Lizaad Williams; Zakhele Qwabe; Nkululeko Serame; Pieter Malan; Ricardo Vasconcelos; Kyle Simmonds; Curtley Louw; Ziyaad Abrahams	Gionne Koopman; Mncedisi Malika; Gerhardt Abrahams; Somila Seyibokwe; Jerry Nqolo; Christiaan Jonker; Clayton Bosch; Yaseen Vallie; Ayabulela Gqamane; Marco Marais; Phaphama Fojela; Sithembile Langa; Akhona Mnyaka	Lefa Mosena; Attie Maposa; Graham Hume; Ruhan Pretorius; Gareth Dukes; Kushen Kishun; Cody Chetty; Kurtlyn Mannikam; Luke Schlemmer; Grant Roelofsen; Sohail Mahmoud; Nduduzo Mfoza; Kyle Nipper	Peter Moor; Kudzai Sauramba; Ainsley Ndlovu; Brian Chari; Kevin Kasuza; Innocent Kaia; Tinashe Kamunhukamwe; Timycen Maruma; Nathan Waller; Neville Madziva; Rugare Magarira; Tinotenda Mutombodzi; Keith Jaure

=== Points table ===
Team	Pld	W	L	T	NR	Pts	NRR
(South Africa) KwaZulu-Natal Inland	3	2	0	0	1	10	+0.815
(South Africa) Boland	3	1	0	0	2	9	+3.877
(South Africa) Border	3	0	1	0	2	4	–0.747
Zimbabwe	3	0	2	0	1	2	–2.188

=== Fixtures ===
15 September 2017
12:45
Scorecard

Zimbabwe; 165/7 (20 overs)	v	(South Africa) KwaZulu-Natal Inland; 166/7 (18.1 overs)

KwaZulu-Natal Inland won by 3 wickets
Buffalo Park, East London

- KwaZulu-Natal Inland won the toss and elected to field.
- Nduduzo Mfoza, Kerwin Mungroo (KwaZulu-Natal Inland), Keith Jaure, Innocent Kaia and Ainsley Ndlovu (Zimbabwe) all made their T20 debuts.

15 September 2017
16:30
Scorecard

Boland (South Africa); 28/0 (4 overs)	v	(South Africa) Border

No result
Buffalo Park, East London

- Border won the toss and elected to field.
- Ricardo Vasconcelos, Curtley Louw (Boland) and Sithembile Langa (Borland) all made their T20 debuts.

16 September 2017
09:30
Scorecard

KwaZulu-Natal Inland (South Africa)	v	(South Africa) Boland

Match abandoned
Buffalo Park, East London

- No toss.

16 September 2017
13:00
Scorecard

Border (South Africa)	v	Zimbabwe

Match abandoned
Buffalo Park, East London

- No toss.

17 September 2017
09:30
Scorecard

Zimbabwe; 76 (13.4 overs)	v	(South Africa) Boland; 79/0 (8.5 overs)

Boland won by 10 wickets
Buffalo Park, East London

- Boland won the toss and elected to field.

17 September 2017
13:00
Scorecard

Border (South Africa); 164/7 (20 overs)	v	(South Africa) KwaZulu-Natal Inland; 170/4 (19 overs)

KwaZulu-Natal Inland won by 6 wickets
Buffalo Park, East London

- KwaZulu-Natal Inland won the toss and elected to field.

== Finals ==
=== Semi-finals ===
24 September 2017
09:30
Scorecard

Gauteng (South Africa); 110/8 (20 overs)	v	(South Africa) KwaZulu-Natal Inland; 111/2 (14.4 overs)

KwaZulu-Natal Inland won by 8 wickets
De Beers Diamond Oval, Kimberley

- KwaZulu-Natal Inland won the toss and elected to field.

24 September 2017
13:00
Scorecard

Namibia; 163/3 (20 overs)	v	(South Africa) Free State; 166/0 (17.3 overs)

Free State won by 10 wickets
De Beers Diamond Oval, Kimberley

- Free State won the toss and elected to field.

=== Final ===
25 September 2017
10:00
Scorecard

Free State (South Africa); 128/5 (20 overs)	v	(South Africa) KwaZulu-Natal Inland; 129/4 (17.5 overs)

KwaZulu-Natal Inland won by 6 wickets
De Beers Diamond Oval, Kimberley

- KwaZulu-Natal Inland won the toss and elected to field.
