= 2018–19 CSA Provincial One-Day Challenge =

Cricket tournament

- Dates: 7 October 2018 – 7 April 2019
- Administrator(s): Cricket South Africa
- Cricket format: List A
- Tournament format(s): Round-robin
- Champions: (South Africa) Easterns (1st title)
- Participants: 13
- Most runs: Leus du Plooy (593)
- Most wickets: Mpilo Njoloza (24)

The 2018–19 CSA Provincial One-Day Challenge was a List A cricket competition that took place in South Africa from 7 October 2018 to 7 April 2019. The tournament was played in parallel with the 2018–19 CSA 3-Day Provincial Cup, a first-class competition which featured the same teams. North West were the defending champions.

The competition was played between the thirteen South African provincial teams. In previous editions of the competition, Namibia had also competed. However, in October 2018 they withdrew from South Africa's provincial competitions, citing issues around costs and logistics.

Easterns won Pool A and Northerns won Pool B to advance to the final, with Easterns appearing in their first one-day final in 16 years. Easterns won the tournament, after they beat Northerns by two wickets in the final.

== Points table ==
Pool A

Team	Pld	W	L	T	NR	Pts
(South Africa) Easterns	10	7	3	0	0	30
(South Africa) Gauteng	10	6	4	0	0	30
(South Africa) Free State	10	6	4	0	0	26
(South Africa) Eastern Province	10	5	4	0	1	25
(South Africa) KwaZulu-Natal Inland	10	4	6	0	0	18
(South Africa) Boland	10	3	7	0	0	13

Team qualified for the final

Pool B

Team	Pld	W	L	T	NR	Pts
(South Africa) Northerns	10	9	1	0	0	38
(South Africa) South Western Districts	10	6	3	0	1	28
(South Africa) North West	10	5	3	0	2	25
(South Africa) Western Province	10	4	6	0	0	19
(South Africa) Northern Cape	10	3	5	0	2	17
(South Africa) KwaZulu-Natal	10	3	7	0	0	13
(South Africa) Border	10	0	8	0	2	4

Team qualified for the final

== Fixtures ==
=== October 2018 ===
7 October 2018
Scorecard

Easterns (South Africa); 240 (45.5 overs)	v	(South Africa) Boland; 238 (50 overs)
Matthew Arnold 58 (51); Kyle Simmonds 3/33 (10 overs)		Ferisco Adams 83 (96); Armand Erasmus 3/41 (10 overs)

Easterns won by 2 runs
Willowmoore Park, Benoni
Umpires: Siphelele Gasa and Clifford Isaacs

- Boland won the toss and elected to field.
- Aron Visser (Easterns) made his List A debut.

7 October 2018
Scorecard

Gauteng (South Africa); 228 (42.2 overs)	v	(South Africa) KwaZulu-Natal Inland; 229/3 (35.2 overs)
Mangaliso Mosehle 105 (83); Gareth Dukes 2/24 (6.2 overs)		Luke Schlemmer 117* (110); Delano Potgieter 1/23 (5 overs)

KwaZulu-Natal Inland won by 7 wickets
Walter Milton Oval, Johannesburg
Umpires: Ryan Hendricks and Philip Vosloo

- Gauteng won the toss and elected to bat.
- Joshua Richards and Juan Landsberg (Gauteng) both made their List A debuts.

14 October 2018
Scorecard

KwaZulu-Natal (South Africa); 218 (45.2 overs)	v	(South Africa) Border; 192 (39.5 overs)
Dudu Zondo 44 (60); Phaphama Fojela 4/32 (10 overs)		Bradley Williams 68 (97); Daryn Dupavillon 4/28 (10 overs)

KwaZulu-Natal won by 26 runs
Kingsmead, Durban
Umpires: Clifford Isaacs and Jurie Sadler

- KwaZulu-Natal won the toss and elected to bat.

14 October 2018
Scorecard

Western Province (South Africa); 258/8 (50 overs)	v	(South Africa) Easterns; 261/6 (42.5 overs)
Jonathan Bird 104 (102); Dyllan Matthews 2/39 (10 overs)		Wesley Marshall 57 (59); Matthew Kleinveldt 2/25 (7 overs)

Easterns won by 4 wickets
Newlands, Cape Town
Umpires: Lubabalo Gcuma and Marlon Jansen

- Western Province won the toss and elected to bat.
- Jonathan Bird and Renaldo Meyer (Western Province) both made their List A debuts.

14 October 2018
Scorecard

North West (South Africa); 289/7 (50 overs)	v	(South Africa) Eastern Province; 66/3 (14.2 overs)
Yaseen Valli 107 (144); Andrew Birch 3/35 (10 overs)		Andrew Birch 24 (17); Brady Barends 1/6 (2 overs)

No result
St George's Park, Port Elizabeth
Umpires: Rudi Birkenstock and Siphelele Gasa

- Eastern Province won the toss and elected to field.
- Rain during Eastern Province's innings prevented any further play.
- Kenan Smith (Eastern Province) made his List A debut.

14 October 2018
Scorecard

Free State (South Africa); 168 (46.1 overs)	v	(South Africa) Northerns; 169/8 (41.2 overs)
Thandolwethu Mnyaka 45 (48); Gideon Peters 4/55 (10 overs)		Diego Rosier 53* (61); Gerald Coetzee 5/33 (10 overs)

Northerns won by 2 wickets
Mangaung Oval, Bloemfontein
Umpires: Ryan Hendricks and Philip Vosloo

- Northerns won the toss and elected to field.
- Gerald Coetzee (Free State) and Gideon Peters (Northerns) both made their List A debuts.

21 October 2018
Scorecard

Easterns (South Africa); 320/5 (50 overs)	v	(South Africa) Gauteng; 301/9 (50 overs)
Wesley Marshall 81 (73); Shaylen Pillay 2/46 (9 overs)		Joshua Richards 77 (89); Imran Manack 3/30 (10 overs)

Easterns won by 19 runs
Willowmoore Park, Benoni
Umpires: Thomas Mokorosi and Dennis Smith

- Gauteng won the toss and elected to field.

21 October 2018
Scorecard

KwaZulu-Natal (South Africa); 252/8 (50 overs)	v	(South Africa) North West; 255/5 (48.5 overs)
Michael Erlank 67* (63); Wihan Lubbe 2/34 (10 overs)		Kagiso Rapulana 119* (139); Keith Dudgeon 2/69 (9.5 overs)

North West won by 5 wickets
Senwes Park, Potchefstroom
Umpires: Johan Cloete and Murray Brown

- KwaZulu-Natal won the toss and elected to bat.
- Louren Steenkamp, Hlompo Modimokwane (North West) and Bradley Porteous (KwaZulu-Natal) all made their List A debuts.

21 October 2018
Scorecard

Western Province (South Africa); 188 (50 overs)	v	(South Africa) Northern Cape; 192/9 (45.4 overs)
Isaac Dikgale 35 (60); Kagiso Mohale 4/44 (10 overs)		Mtabozuko Nqam 62* (79); George Linde 3/48 (10 overs)

Northern Cape won by 1 wicket
Newlands, Cape Town
Umpires: Ryan Hendricks and Abdoellah Steenkamp

- Western Province won the toss and elected to bat.
- Mtabozuko Nqam and Nangomso Mqaleni (Northern Cape) both made their List A debuts.

28 October 2018
Scorecard

Eastern Province (South Africa); 225 (45.1 overs)	v	(South Africa) KwaZulu-Natal Inland; 227/4 (44.5 overs)
Kelly Smuts 68 (63); Gareth Dukes 5/26 (8.1 overs)		Sohail Mahmoud 122* (120); Tian Koekemoer 3/34 (9 overs)

KwaZulu-Natal Inland won by 6 wickets
St George's Park, Port Elizabeth
Umpires: Arno Jacobs and Jurie Sadler

- KwaZulu-Natal Inland won the toss and elected to field.

28 October 2018
Scorecard

Free State (South Africa); 111 (39.4 overs)	v	(South Africa) Gauteng; 115/3 (16.2 overs)
Karabo Mogotsi 26 (56); Nono Pongolo 6/22 (10 overs)		Ryan Rickelton 62* (39); Gerald Coetzee 2/46 (6 overs)

Gauteng won by 7 wickets
Mangaung Oval, Bloemfontein
Umpires: Dennis Smith and Marlon Jansen

- Free State won the toss and elected to bat.
- Siphamandla Mavanda (Free State) and Aristides Karvelas (Gauteng) both made their List A debuts.

28 October 2018
Scorecard

South Western Districts (South Africa); 211/8 (50 overs)	v	(South Africa) Boland; 202 (46 overs)
Obus Pienaar 68 (81); Kyle Simmonds 2/20 (10 overs)		Simon Khomari 70 (95); Marcello Piedt 4/35 (10 overs)

South Western Districts won by 9 runs
Boland Park, Paarl
Umpires: Clifford Isaacs and Abdoellah Steenkamp

- Boland won the toss and elected to field.
- Marco de Kock, Stefan Tait and Hershell America (South Western Districts) all made their List A debuts.

=== November 2018 ===
4 November 2018
Scorecard

Northerns (South Africa); 288/8 (50 overs)	v	(South Africa) Northern Cape; 98 (28 overs)
Leus du Plooy 114 (113); Mbulelo Budaza 5/58 (10 overs)		Tristan Traugott 24 (40); Gregory Mahlokwana 4/22 (9 overs)

Northerns won by 190 runs
Tshwane University of Technology Oval, Pretoria
Umpires: Johan Cloete and Kevin Lawrence

- Northern Cape won the toss and elected to field.
- Tristan Traugott (Northern Cape) made his List A debut.

4 November 2018
Scorecard

KwaZulu-Natal (South Africa); 242/7 (50 overs)	v	(South Africa) Free State; 243/7 (49.3 overs)
Khalipha Cele 75 (100); Thandolwethu Mnyaka 2/34 (8 overs)		Janko Dreyer 69 (88); Keith Dudgeon 2/35 (10 overs)

Free State won by 3 wickets
Chatsworth Stadium, Durban
Umpires: Lubabalo Gcuma and Marlon Jansen

- KwaZulu-Natal won the toss and elected to bat.

4 November 2018
Scorecard

South Western Districts (South Africa); 264/7 (50 overs)	v	(South Africa) KwaZulu-Natal Inland; 197 (44 overs)
Obus Pienaar 141* (126); 2/21 (5 overs)		Luke Schlemmer 50 (57); Stefan Tait 4/43 (10 overs)

South Western Districts won by 67 runs
City Oval, Pietermaritzburg
Umpires: Dennis Smith and Ryan Hendricks

- KwaZulu-Natal Inland won the toss and elected to field.
- Mesuli Vuba (South Western Districts) made his List A debut.

4 November 2018
Scorecard

Border (South Africa); 66 (19.4 overs)	v	(South Africa) Eastern Province; 67/0 (12.4 overs)
Christiaan Jonker 24 (40); Tian Koekemoer 3/8 (5 overs)		Matthew Breetzke 32* (40)

Eastern Province won by 10 wickets
St George's Park, Port Elizabeth
Umpires: Arno Jacobs and Jurie Sadler

- Eastern Province won the toss and elected to field.

10 November 2018
Scorecard

Northerns (South Africa); 283/7 (50 overs)	v	(South Africa) KwaZulu-Natal Inland; 246 (48.1 overs)
Rubin Hermann 114 (87); Attie Maposa 2/36 (10 overs)		Luke Schlemmer 63 (63); Gideon Peters 3/51 (10 overs)

Northerns won by 37 runs
Tshwane University of Technology Oval, Pretoria
Umpires: Rudi Birkenstock and Marlon Jansen

- KwaZulu-Natal Inland won the toss and elected to field.

11 November 2018
Scorecard

Western Province (South Africa); 263/6 (50 overs)	v	(South Africa) South Western Districts; 267/5 (49.4 overs)
Matthew Kleinveldt 134 (159); Niel Hornbuckle 2/42 (10 overs)		Niel Hornbuckle 123* (155); Mpilo Njoloza 4/46 (10 overs)

South Western Districts won by 5 wickets
Recreation Ground, Oudtshoorn
Umpires: Murray Brown and Abdoellah Steenkamp

- Western Province won the toss and elected to bat.

11 November 2018
Scorecard

North West (South Africa); 233 (45.3 overs)	v	(South Africa) Gauteng; 205 (46.5 overs)
Kagiso Rapulana 104 (103); Tumelo Tlhokwe 3/38 (6 overs)		Shaylen Pillay 75 (103); Marco Jansen 3/29 (6.5 overs)

North West won by 28 runs
Senwes Park, Potchefstroom
Umpires: Kevin Lawrence and Siphelele Gasa

- Gauteng won the toss and elected to field.
- Grant Martin (North West) made his List A debut.

18 November 2018
Scorecard

Easterns (South Africa); 154 (33.3 overs)	v	(South Africa) Free State
Wesley Marshall 38 (37); Thandolwethu Mnyaka 3/19 (5.3 overs)

Innings break
Willowmoore Park, Benoni
Umpires: Philip Vosloo and Stephen Rex

- Free State won the toss and elected to field.

18 November 2018
Scorecard

Boland (South Africa); 217/8 (50 overs)	v	(South Africa) Northern Cape; 221/4 (45.1 overs)
Murray Commins 91* (114); Desmond de Koker 4/28 (10 overs)		Farhaan Sayanvala 81 (115); Nkululeko Serame 2/36 (10 overs)

Northern Cape won by 6 wickets
Diamond Oval, Kimberley
Umpires: Gawie Botha and Ryan Hendricks

- Boland won the toss and elected to bat
- Shaakir Abrahams (Boland) made his List A debut.

25 November 2018
Scorecard

North West (South Africa); 329/2 (50 overs)	v	(South Africa) Border; 275 (46.1 overs)
Kagiso Rapulana 91* (100); Bamanye Xengxe 2/84 (10 overs)		Yaseen Vallie 64 (72); Katleho Leokaoke 5/56 (10 overs)

North West won by 54 runs
Buffalo Park, East London
Umpires: Thomas Mokorosi and N Gampu

- Border won the toss and elected to field.
- Sihle Magongoma and Joshua Dodd (Border) both made their List A debuts.

25 November 2018
Scorecard

South Western Districts (South Africa); 271/7 (50 overs)	v	(South Africa) Northerns; 243 (46.4 overs)
Jean du Plessis 99 (112); Luvuyo Nkese 3/43 (9.4 overs)		Rubin Hermann 57 (61); Tsepo Ndwandwa 3/62 (10 overs)

South Western Districts won by 28 runs
Recreation Ground, Oudtshoorn
Umpires: Godwin Von Willingh and Jurie Sadler

- Northerns won the toss and elected to field.

25 November 2018
Scorecard

KwaZulu-Natal (South Africa); 250/9 (50 overs)	v	(South Africa) KwaZulu-Natal Inland; 231 (48.1 overs)
Prenelan Subrayen 47 (64); Sohail Mahmoud 3/41 (10 overs)		Gareth Dukes 48 (50); Thula Ngcobo 3/33 (9 overs)

KwaZulu-Natal won by 19 runs
City Oval, Pietermaritzburg
Umpires: Siphelele Gasa and Bongani Ntshebe

- KwaZulu-Natal won the toss and elected to bat.

=== December 2018 ===
2 December 2018
Scorecard

Northern Cape (South Africa); 88 (31.2 overs)	v	(South Africa) South Western Districts; 90/3 (16.2 overs)
Farhaan Sayanvala 26 (27); Tsepo Ndwandwa 3/17 (10 overs)		Niel Hornbuckle 43 (40); Kagiso Mohale 1/17 (2.2 overs)

South Western Districts won by 7 wickets
Recreation Ground, Oudtshoorn
Umpires: Jan Erasmus and Stephen Rex

- Northern Cape won the toss and elected to bat.

9 December 2018
Scorecard

Border (South Africa)	v	(South Africa) South Western Districts

Match abandoned
Buffalo Park, East London
Umpires: Jurie Sadler and Kevin Lawrence

- No toss.
- No play was possible due to rain.

16 December 2018
Scorecard

Eastern Province (South Africa); 200 (45.4 overs)	v	(South Africa) KwaZulu-Natal; 136 (34.4 overs)
Edward Moore 61 (68); Marques Ackerman 4/26 (9.4 overs)		Tyron Koen 30* (48); Kelly Smuts 5/34 (10 overs)

Eastern Province won by 64 runs
Chatsworth Stadium, Durban
Umpires: Sinethemba Mjekula and Murray Brown

- Eastern Province won the toss and elected to bat.

16 December 2018
Scorecard

Free State (South Africa); 211 (48.4 overs)	v	(South Africa) KwaZulu-Natal Inland; 216/5 (37.2 overs)
Romano Terblanche 52 (60); Gareth Dukes 4/39 (8.4 overs)		Ruhan Pretorius 63* (73); Sean Whitehead 2/39 (7 overs)

KwaZulu-Natal Inland won by 5 wickets
City Oval, Pietermaritzburg
Umpires: Abongile Sodumo and Lubabalo Gcuma

- Free State won the toss and elected to bat.

16 December 2018
Scorecard

Northern Cape (South Africa); 197 (49.2 overs)	v	(South Africa) Gauteng; 198/3 (33.1 overs)
Driaan Bruwer 45 (77); Masilo Ramothata 3/28 (10 overs)		Joshua Richards 100 (96); Akhona Kula 2/46 (10 overs)

Gauteng won by 7 wickets
Diamond Oval, Kimberley
Umpires: Thomas Mokorosi and Abdoellah Steenkamp

- Northern Cape won the toss and elected to bat.

16 December 2018
Scorecard

North West (South Africa); 223 (46.1 overs)	v	(South Africa) Northerns; 225/3 (44.3 overs)
Nicky van den Bergh 44 (49); Ruan de Swardt 3/29 (9 overs)		Victor Mahlangu 107* (150); Johannes Diseko 2/51 (10 overs)

Northerns won by 7 wickets
Senwes Park, Potchefstroom
Umpires: Johan Cloete and Gladman Gaseba

- Northerns won the toss and elected to field.

=== January 2019 ===
13 January 2019
Scorecard

South Western Districts (South Africa); 187/9 (50 overs)	v	(South Africa) North West; 190/6 (47.2 overs)
Obus Pienaar 83* (110); Louren Steenkamp 2/17 (7 overs)		Jean Bredenkamp 55 (98); Marcello Piedt 2/27 (10 overs)

North West won by 4 wickets
Senwes Park, Potchefstroom
Umpires: Gawie Botha and Lubabalo Gcuma

- North West won the toss and elected to field.

13 January 2019
Scorecard

Northerns (South Africa); 254/7 (50 overs)	v	(South Africa) Eastern Province; 205 (47.3 overs)
Leus du Plooy 131 (143); Henco Vorstman 2/20 (6 overs)		Onke Nyaku 46 (79); Luvuyo Nkese 3/36 (8.3 overs)

Northerns won by 49 runs
Centurion Park, Centurion
Umpires: Dennis Smith and Abongile Sodumo

- Eastern Province won the toss and elected to field.
- Joshua van Heerden and Henco Vorstman (Eastern Province) both made their List A debuts.

13 January 2019
Scorecard

Border (South Africa); 160 (42 overs)	v	(South Africa) Easterns; 161/8 (40 overs)
Joshua Dodd 36 (49); Imran Manack 3/25 (9 overs)		Matthew Arnold 40 (68); Bradley Mauer 3/34 (10 overs)

Easterns won by 2 wickets
Buffalo Park, East London
Umpires: Godwin Von Willingh and Brad White

- Border won the toss and elected to bat.
- Lizo Makhosi (Border) made his List A debut.

13 January 2019
Scorecard

Northern Cape (South Africa); 166 (38.3 overs)	v	(South Africa) Free State; 167/6 (44.1 overs)
Farhaan Sayanvala 49 (53); Eddie Leie 4/44 (10 overs)		Karabo Mogotsi 68* (117); Sinovuyo Ntuntwana 2/26 (10 overs)

Free State won by 4 wickets
Diamond Oval, Kimberley
Umpires: Jan Erasmus and Stephen Harris

- Free State won the toss and elected to field.

20 January 2019
Scorecard

Free State (South Africa); 133 (34.3 overs)	v	(South Africa) North West; 103 (31.4 overs)
Dilivio Ridgaard 27* (56); Johannes Diseko 4/16 (4.3 overs)		Marco Jansen 26 (36); Jonathan Draai 3/21 (7 overs)

Free State won by 30 runs
Mangaung Oval, Bloemfontein
Umpires: Ryan Hendricks and Mazizi Gampu

- North West won the toss and elected to field.
- Khanya Cotani and Duan Jansen (North West) both made their List A debuts.

20 January 2019
Scorecard

KwaZulu-Natal (South Africa); 185 (44.2 overs)	v	(South Africa) Western Province; 186/5 (39.2 overs)
Matthew Montgomery 104 (121); Mpilo Njoloza 5/26 (10 overs)		Matthew Kleinveldt 101 (113); Andile Mokgakane 1/4 (1 over)

Western Province won by 5 wickets
Chatsworth Stadium, Durban
Umpires: Rudi Birkenstock and Sinethemba Mjekula

- Western Province won the toss and elected to field.
- Matthew Montgomery, Yves Kamanzi (KwaZulu-Natal) and Mihlali Mpongwana (Western Province) all made their List A debuts.

27 January 2019
Scorecard

Easterns (South Africa); 229/8 (50 overs)	v	(South Africa) Boland; 230/8 (49.4 overs)
Armand Erasmus 49 (32); Lizaad Williams 3/52 (8 overs)		Dayyaan Galiem 96* (114); Imran Manack 3/26 (10 overs)

Boland won by 2 wickets
Boland Park, Paarl
Umpires: Arno Jacobs and Dawood Arkeldien

- Easterns won the toss and elected to bat.
- Achille Cloete (Boland) made his List A debut.

=== February 2019 ===
3 February 2019
Scorecard

Northern Cape (South Africa); 290/5 (42 overs)	v	(South Africa) Border; 8/1 (1 over)
Gerhardt Abrahams 121* (113); Joshua Dodd 1/42 (5 overs)		Bradley Williams 6* (3); Sinovuyo Ntuntwana 1/8 (1 over)

No result
Buffalo Park, East London
Umpires: Abongile Sodumo and Murray Brown

- Border won the toss and elected to field.

10 February 2019
Scorecard

Northern Cape (South Africa)	v	(South Africa) North West

Match abandoned
Diamond Oval, Kimberley

- No toss.
- No play was possible due to rain.

10 February 2019
Scorecard

Gauteng (South Africa); 335/7 (50 overs)	v	(South Africa) Western Province; 203 (44 overs)
Mitchell Van Buuren 200 (159); Justin Dill 3/47 (10 overs)		Matthew Kleinveldt 55 (62); Shaylen Pillay 4/40 (8 overs)

Gauteng won by 132 runs
New Wanderers Stadium, Johannesburg
Umpires: Rudi Birkenstock and Marlon Jansen

- Western Province won the toss and elected to field.
- Cameron Shekleton, Thamsanqa Rapelego (Gauteng) and Thando Ntini (Western Province) all made their List A debuts.

10 February 2019
Scorecard

Northerns (South Africa); 252 (49.3 overs)	v	(South Africa) Easterns; 233 (48.1 overs)
Diego Rosier 119 (134); Kofi Apea-Adu 4/45 (10 overs)		Sizwe Masondo 84 (87); Alfred Mothoa 3/47 (9.1 overs)

Northerns won by 19 runs
Willowmoore Park, Benoni
Umpires: Arno Jacobs and Abdoellah Steenkamp

- Easterns won the toss and elected to field.

10 February 2019
Scorecard

Boland (South Africa); 200 (47.4 overs)	v	(South Africa) Eastern Province; 94/5 (22.1 overs)
David Bedingham 36 (33); Jade de Klerk 4/27 (10 overs)		Edward Moore 37 (57); Nkululeko Serame 3/9 (3.1 overs)

Boland won by 19 runs (D/L method)
St George's Park, Port Elizabeth
Umpires: Clifford Isaacs and Dawood Arkeldien

- Eastern Province won the toss and elected to field.

10 February 2019
Scorecard

KwaZulu-Natal (South Africa); 225/9 (50 overs)	v	(South Africa) South Western Districts; 226/4 (49.4 overs)
Matthew Montgomery 56 (69); Marcello Piedt 2/27 (10 overs)		Jean du Plessis 107 (148); Keith Dudgeon 2/39 (6.4 overs)

South Western Districts won by 6 wickets
Recreation Ground, Oudtshoorn
Umpires: Thomas Mokorosi and Stephen Rex

- KwaZulu-Natal won the toss and elected to bat.
- Travis Ackerman (South Western Districts) made his List A debut.

17 February 2019
Scorecard

Boland (South Africa); 177 (49.2 overs)	v	(South Africa) Gauteng; 178/4 (31.2 overs)
Hanno Kotze 48 (80); Thamsanqa Rapelego 4/32 (10 overs)		Mitchell Van Buuren 51* (46); Kyle Simmonds 2/56 (10 overs)

Gauteng won by 6 wickets
Boland Park, Paarl
Umpires: Jurie Sadler and Abdoellah Steenkamp

- Boland won the toss and elected to bat.

17 February 2019
Scorecard

Western Province (South Africa); 250/7 (50 overs)	v	(South Africa) North West; 233/7 (50 overs)
Aviwe Mgijima 77 (104); Louren Steenkamp 3/56 (10 overs)		Yaseen Valli99 * (128); Mihlali Mpongwana 3/37 (9 overs)

Western Province won by 17 runs
Newlands, Cape Town
Umpires: Thomas Mokorosi and Philip Vosloo

- North West won the toss and elected to field.
- Mark Adrianatos (Western Province) and Jon Hinrichsen (North West) both made their List A debuts.

17 February 2019
Scorecard

Border (South Africa); 244/7 (50 overs)	v	(South Africa) Northerns; 248/1 (36.4 overs)
Marco Marais 100* (83); Tshepo Moreki 2/60 (10 overs)		Victor Mahlangu 104* (105); Mkhululi Calana 1/28 (4 overs)

Northerns won by 9 wickets
Buffalo Park, East London
Umpires: Hassen Dawood and Bongani Ntshebe

- Northerns won the toss and elected to field.

17 February 2019
Scorecard

South Western Districts (South Africa); 161/9 (37 overs)	v	(South Africa) Easterns; 162/9 (37 overs)
Jean du Plessis 87* (103); Imran Manack 3/23 (8 overs)		Kabelo Sekhukhune 50 (59); Hershell America 3/21 (7 overs)

Easterns won by 1 wicket
Willowmoore Park, Benoni
Umpires: Ryan Hendricks and Marlon Jansen

- Easterns won the toss and elected to field.
- The match was reduced to 37 overs per side due to rain.

24 February 2019
Scorecard

KwaZulu-Natal (South Africa); 234 (47.3 overs)	v	(South Africa) Northerns; 237/6 (47.5 overs)
Eathan Bosch 59 (65); Leus du Plooy 3/19 (3.3 overs)		Jonathan Vandiar 83 (85); Smangaliso Nhlebela 2/51 (10 overs)

Northerns won by 4 wickets
Centurion Park, Centurion
Umpires: Dennis Smith and Gladman Gaseba

- Northerns won the toss and elected to field.
- Nikhil Prem (KwaZulu-Natal) made his List A debut.

24 February 2019
Scorecard

Western Province (South Africa); 167 (47.5 overs)	v	(South Africa) KwaZulu-Natal Inland; 173/8 (44.5 overs)
Mihlali Mpongwana 47 (78); Ruhan Pretorius 4/30 (10 overs)		Grant Roelofsen 36 (64); Mihlali Mpongwana 3/22 (7 overs)

KwaZulu-Natal Inland won by 2 wickets
Newlands, Cape Town
Umpires: Rudi Birkenstock and Murray Brown

- Western Province won the toss and elected to bat.

24 February 2019
Scorecard

Eastern Province (South Africa); 193/9 (50 overs)	v	(South Africa) Gauteng; 173 (48 overs)
Onke Nyaku 56 (88); Aristides Karvelas 3/35 (10 overs)		Joshua Richards 34 (68); Jade de Klerk 3/46 (10 overs)

Eastern Province won by 20 runs
New Wanderers Stadium, Johannesburg
Umpires: Johan Cloete and Thomas Mokorosi

- Gauteng won the toss and elected to field.

=== March 2019 ===
3 March 2019
Scorecard

Eastern Province (South Africa); 246/6 (50 overs)	v	(South Africa) South Western Districts; 200 (49.4 overs)
Thomas Kaber 88 (96); Marcello Piedt 2/45 (8 overs)		Niel Hornbuckle 48 (65); Kenan Smith 3/50 (10 overs)

Eastern Province won by 46 runs
Recreation Ground, Oudtshoorn
Umpires: Abongile Sodumo and Abdoellah Steenkamp

- Eastern Province won the toss and elected to bat.

3 March 2019
Scorecard

Boland (South Africa); 151 (37.4 overs)	v	(South Africa) Western Province; 152/5 (34.4 overs)
Ferisco Adams 40 (43); Junaid Dawood 4/25 (6.4 overs)		Jason Smith 28 (27); Kyle Simmonds 2/34 (10 overs)

Western Province won by 5 wickets
Boland Park, Paarl
Umpires: Ryan Hendricks and Bongani Ntshebe

- Boland won the toss and elected to bat.

3 March 2019
Scorecard

Free State (South Africa); 223 (45.5 overs)	v	(South Africa) Border; 193 (48.2 overs)
Raynard van Tonder 63 (90); Mkhululi Calana 3/35 (5.3 overs)		Kyle Jacobs 63 (95); Corné Dry 4/28 (9.2 overs)

Free State won by 30 runs
University of Free State Ground, Bloemfontein
Umpires: Godwin Von Willingh and Jurie Sadler

- Border won the toss and elected to field.
- Pheko Moletsane (Free State) and Kyle Jacobs (Border) both made their List A debuts.

3 March 2019
Scorecard

KwaZulu-Natal Inland (South Africa); 159 (33.5 overs)	v	(South Africa) Northern Cape; 163/8 (40 overs)
Gareth Dukes 60 (34); Aubrey Swanepoel 3/8 (1.5 overs)		Aubrey Swanepoel 44 (57); Ruhan Pretorius 2/19 (7 overs)

Northern Cape won by 2 wickets
Diamond Oval, Kimberley
Umpires: Mazizi Gampu and Marlon Jansen

- Northern Cape won the toss and elected to field.

10 March 2019
Scorecard

North West (South Africa); 274 (49.3 overs)	v	(South Africa) Boland; 162 (38.4 overs)
Jean Bredenkamp 75 (94); Sinalo Gobeni 3/37 (6 overs)		Dayyaan Galiem 40 (50); Craig Alexander 4/39 (10 overs)

North West won by 112 runs
Senwes Park, Potchefstroom
Umpires: Clifford Isaacs and Abdoellah Steenkamp

- North West won the toss and elected to bat.

17 March 2019
Scorecard

Easterns (South Africa); 331/8 (43 overs)	v	(South Africa) KwaZulu-Natal Inland; 328 (42.4 overs)
Grant Thomson 93 (48); Kyle Nipper 3/71 (9 overs)		Cody Chetty 123 (73); Imran Manack 3/70 (9 overs)

Easterns won by 3 runs
City Oval, Pietermaritzburg
Umpires: Kevin Lawrence and Clifford Isaacs

- Easterns won the toss and elected to bat.
- Mpumelelo Xulu (KwaZulu-Natal Inland) made his List A debut.

17 March 2019
Scorecard

Border (South Africa); 160 (43.4 overs)	v	(South Africa) Gauteng; 166/2 (26.5 overs)
Bradley Williams 37 (58); Chad Classen 3/44 (9 overs)		Ryan Rickelton 78* (78); Malwande Zamo 1/12 (3 overs)

Gauteng won by 8 wickets
New Wanderers Stadium, Johannesburg
Umpires: Philip Vosloo and Stephen Rex

- Gauteng won the toss and elected to field.

17 March 2019
Scorecard

Northerns (South Africa); 308/8 (50 overs)	v	(South Africa) Western Province; 298/6 (50 overs)
Leus du Plooy 155 (122); Mihlali Mpongwana 3/51 (8 overs)		Qaasim Adams 96 (92); Eldred Hawken 4/48 (10 overs)

Northerns won by 10 runs
Centurion Park, Centurion
Umpires: Hassen Dawood and Abdoellah Steenkamp

- Western Province won the toss and elected to field.
- Thomas Mashiane, Kulani Baloyi and Itumaleng Moseki (Northerns) all made their List A debuts.

24 March 2019
Scorecard

KwaZulu-Natal (South Africa); 242/9 (50 overs)	v	(South Africa) Northern Cape; 157 (33.4 overs)
Tyron Koen 53 (52); Jacques Snyman 2/28 (10 overs)		Aubrey Swanepoel 28 (30); Daryn Dupavillon 6/28 (8.4 overs)

KwaZulu-Natal won by 85 runs
Chatsworth Stadium, Durban
Umpires: Thomas Mokorosi and Bongani Ntshebe

- KwaZulu-Natal won the toss and elected to bat.
- Thamsanqa Khumalo, Khwezi Gumede (KwaZulu-Natal) and Garnett Tarr (Northern Cape) all made their List A debuts.

24 March 2019
Scorecard

KwaZulu-Natal Inland (South Africa); 136 (31.1 overs)	v	(South Africa) Boland; 139/4 (29.3 overs)
Luke Schlemmer 30 (56); Achille Cloete 4/28 (7.1 overs)		Simon Khomari 60 (87); Ruhan Pretorius 2/16 (6 overs)

Boland won by 6 wickets
City Oval, Pietermaritzburg
Umpires: Godwin Von Willingh and Philip Vosloo

- Boland won the toss and elected to field.
- Jayden Gengan (KwaZulu-Natal Inland) made his List A debut.

24 March 2019
Scorecard

Eastern Province (South Africa); 206/6 (50 overs)	v	(South Africa) Free State; 113 (31.2 overs)
Tian Koekemoer 53* (54); Eddie Leie 2/27 (10 overs)		Wihan Victor 24 (39); Tian Koekemoer 3/20 (5 overs)

Eastern Province won by 93 runs
University of Free State Ground, Bloemfontein
Umpires: Rudi Birkenstock and Murray Brown

- Free State won the toss and elected to field.
- David Masterson and Keenan Vieira (Eastern Province) both made their List A debuts.

30 March 2019
Scorecard

Border (South Africa); 177 (37.5 overs)	v	(South Africa) Western Province; 179/2 (28.2 overs)
Jason Niemand 53 (63); Mpilo Njoloza 5/50 (10 overs)		Jason Smith 73* (68); Basheeru-Deen Walters 1/14 (6 overs)

Western Province won by 8 wickets
Newlands, Cape Town
Umpires: Lubabalo Gcuma and Jurie Sadler

- Western Province won the toss and elected to field.
- Jonathan Craniey and Siphamandla Krweqe (Border) both made their List A debuts.

31 March 2019
Scorecard

Free State (South Africa); 281/4 (50 overs)	v	(South Africa) Boland; 280/8 (50 overs)
Hanco Olivier 119 (138); Dayyaan Galiem 2/48 (10 overs)		Ferisco Adams 78 (61); Pheko Moletsane 2/38 (9 overs)

Free State won by 1 run
Boland Park, Paarl
Umpires: Johan Cloete and Marlon Jansen

- Free State won the toss and elected to bat.
- Hanco Olivier and Petrus du Plessis (Free State) both made their List A debuts.

31 March 2019
Scorecard

Eastern Province (South Africa); 226/9 (50 overs)	v	(South Africa) Easterns; 231/6 (39 overs)
Edward Moore 100 (140); Jurie Snyman 3/16 (10 overs)		Wesley Coulentianos 60* (74); Luvuyo Adam 2/42 (8 overs)

Easterns won by 4 wickets
St George's Park, Port Elizabeth
Umpires: Murray Brown and Stephen Rex

- Eastern Province won the toss and elected to bat.
- Tiaan van Vuuren (Eastern Province) made his List A debut.

31 March 2019
Scorecard

KwaZulu-Natal (South Africa); 222 (48.2 overs)	v	(South Africa) Gauteng; 223/5 (34.5 overs)
Calvin Savage 65 (45); Tumelo Tlhokwe 3/42 (10 overs)		Mitchell Van Buuren 84* (60); Calvin Savage 4/23 (5 overs)

Gauteng won by 5 wickets
New Wanderers Stadium, Johannesburg
Umpires: Siphelele Gasa and Ryan Hendricks

- Gauteng won the toss and elected to field.

== Final ==
7 April 2019
Scorecard

Northerns (South Africa); 276/8 (50 overs)	v	(South Africa) Easterns; 277/8 (46.5 overs)
Leus du Plooy 85* (108); Matthew Arnold 2/48 (10 overs)		Wesley Marshall 61 (64); Gregory Mahlokwana 3/40 (10 overs)

Easterns won by 2 wickets
Centurion Park, Centurion
Umpires: Abongile Sodumo and Marlon Jansen

- Easterns won the toss and elected to field.
