= Matt Montgomery =

Matt Montgomery may refer to:

- Piggy D. (born 1975), American musician
- Matt Montgomery (cricketer) (born 2000), South African cricketer
