= Sri Lanka A cricket team in South Africa in 2024 =

International cricket tour

	South Africa A	Sri Lanka A
- Dates: 31 August – 15 September 2024
Captains	Neil Brand (First-class); Matthew Breetzke (List A)	Pasindu Sooriyabandara

FC series
- Result: Sri Lanka A won the 2-match series 2–0
Most runs	Neil Brand (174)	Pasindu Sooriyabandara (227)
Most wickets	Prenelan Subrayen (12)	Isitha Wijesundera (13)

LA series
- Result: Sri Lanka A won the 3-match series 2–1
Most runs	David Bedingham (208)	Lahiru Udara (181)
Most wickets	Andile Phehlukwayo (5)	Dushan Hemantha (10)
- Player of the series: Lahiru Udara (Sri Lanka A)

The Sri Lanka A cricket team toured South Africa in August and September 2024 to play against the South Africa A cricket team. The tour consisted of two first-class and three List A matches. The first-class series formed part of both teams' preparation ahead of Test series which was part of 2023–2025 World Test Championship.

== Squads ==
South Africa A		Sri Lanka A	
List A	First-class	List A	First-class
Matthew Breetzke (c); ~~Kyle Verreynne (c)~~; David Bedingham; Eathan Bosch; Dewald Brevis; Tony de Zorzi; Dayyaan Galiem; Tristan Luus; Mihlali Mpongwana; Andile Mokgakane; Senuran Muthusamy; Andile Phehlukwayo; Meeka-eel Prince; Andile Simelane; Lutho Sipamla; Codi Yusuf	Neil Brand (c); Marques Ackerman; Matthew Breetzke; Dewald Brevis; Tshepang Dithole; Jean du Plessis; Patrick Kruger; Rivaldo Moonsamy; Mihlali Mpongwana; Migael Pretorius; Sinethemba Qeshile; Lutho Sipamla; Prenelan Subrayen; Beyers Swanepoel; Codi Yusuf	Pasindu Sooriyabandara (c); Sahan Arachchige; Sonal Dinusha; Nuwanidu Fernando; Chamika Gunasekara; Dushan Hemantha; Dinura Kalupahana; Eshan Malinga; Kamil Mishara; Kavindu Nadeeshan; Pavan Rathnayake; Wanuja Sahan; Mohamed Shiraz; Lahiru Udara; Chamindu Wickramasinghe	Pasindu Sooriyabandara (c); Sonal Dinusha; Nuwanidu Fernando; Oshada Fernando; Chamika Gunasekara; Dinura Kalupahana; Janith Liyanage; Eshan Malinga; Nishan Peiris; Vishad Randika; Pavan Rathnayake; Wanuja Sahan; Mohamed Shiraz; Lahiru Udara; Ahan Wickramasinghe; Isitha Wijesundera

On 26 August 2024, captain Kyle Verreynne was released from the unofficial ODIs squad to play in the County Championship for Nottinghamshire in England, Meeka-eel Prince was named as his replacement and Matthew Breetzke was named as the captain.

== Unofficial ODI series ==
=== 1st unofficial ODI ===
31 August 2024
10:00
Scorecard

Sri Lanka A 298/9 (50 overs)	v	South Africa A 205 (37 overs)
Nuwanidu Fernando 97 (101); Andile Phehlukwayo 3/38 (10 overs)		Tony de Zorzi 53 (48); Dushan Hemantha 3/34 (6 overs)

Sri Lanka A won by 93 runs
JB Marks Oval, Potchefstroom
Umpires: Stephen Harris (SA) and Allahudien Paleker (SA)
Player of the match: Nuwanidu Fernando (Sri Lanka A)

- South Africa A won the toss and elected to field.

=== 2nd unofficial ODI ===
2 September 2024
10:00
Scorecard

Sri Lanka A 270/7 (50 overs)	v	South Africa A 239 (41.1 overs)
Lahiru Udara 86 (95); Andile Simelane 2/24 (6 overs)		Matthew Breetzke 74 (80); Dushan Hemantha 5/48 (8 overs)

Sri Lanka A won by 31 runs
JB Marks Oval, Potchefstroom
Umpires: Lubabalo Gcuma (SA) and Stephen Harris (SA)
Player of the match: Dushan Hemantha (Sri Lanka A)

- Sri Lanka A won the toss and elected to bat

=== 3rd unofficial ODI ===
4 September 2024
10:00
Scorecard

Sri Lanka A 308/6 (50 overs)	v	South Africa A 311/5 (42.5 overs)
Lahiru Udara 90 (94); Dewald Brevis 4/46 (10 overs)		David Bedingham 188* (129); Dushan Hemantha 2/58 (9.5 overs)

South Africa A won by 5 wickets
JB Marks Oval, Potchefstroom
Umpires: Lubabalo Gcuma (SA) and Allahudien Paleker (SA)
Player of the match: David Bedingham (South Africa A)

- Sri Lanka A won the toss and elected to bat.

== Unofficial Test series ==
=== 1st unofficial Test ===
8–11 September 2024
Scorecard

South Africa A	v	Sri Lanka A
372 (108.2 overs); Matthew Breetzke 129 (213); Eshan Malinga 4/65 (20.2 overs)		323 (91.5 overs); Oshada Fernando 122 (146); Patrick Kruger 1/17 (8 overs)
124 (31 overs); Marques Ackerman 27 (21); Isitha Wijesundera 7/34 (9 overs)		174/4 (43.4 overs); Oshada Fernando 80 (122); Codi Yusuf 2/29 (8 overs)

Sri Lanka A won by 6 wickets
De Beers Diamond Oval, Kimberley
Umpires: Lubabalo Gcuma (SA) and Stephen Harris (SA)
Player of the match: Oshada Fernando (Sri Lanka A)

- South Africa A won the toss and elected to bat.

=== 2nd unofficial Test ===
15–18 September 2024
Scorecard

South Africa A	v	Sri Lanka A
334 (92.1 overs); Neil Brand 129 (253); Sonal Dinusha 3/48 (15 overs)		319 (90.5 overs); Lahiru Udara 129 (192); Prenelan Subrayen 6/64 (21.5 overs)
238/9 (51.2 overs); Dewald Brevis 74 (75); Isitha Wijesundera 2/23 (9 overs)		254/5 (41.3 overs); Pavan Rathnayake 116* (67); Prenelan Subrayen 3/108 (14 overs)

Sri Lanka A won by 5 wickets
Willowmoore Park, Benoni
Umpires: Arno Jacobs (SA) and Allahudien Paleker (SA)
Player of the match: Pavan Rathnayake (Sri Lanka A)

- Sri Lanka A won the toss and elected to field.
