= Tristan Traugott =

South African cricketer (born 1997)

Personal information
- Born: 4 February 1997 (age 29)
- Source: Cricinfo, 4 November 2018

Tristan Traugott (born 4 February 1997) is a South African cricketer. He made his List A debut for Northern Cape in the 2018–19 CSA Provincial One-Day Challenge on 4 November 2018. He made his first-class debut for Northern Cape in the 2018–19 CSA 3-Day Provincial Cup on 15 November 2018.
