= Dian Forrester =

South African cricketer (born 2000)

Personal information
- Full name: Dian Jonathan Forrester
- Born: 7 June 2000 (age 26); Polokwane, Limpopo, South Africa
- Batting: Left-handed
- Bowling: Right-arm fast
- Role: All-rounder

International information
- National side: South Africa
- T20I debut (cap 116): 15 March 2026 v New Zealand
- Last T20I: 25 March 2026 v New Zealand

Domestic team information
- Years: Team
- 2023/24–2024/25: Knights
- 2025/26–present: North West
- 2025-present: Joburg Super Kings
- 2026: Rawalpindiz
- 2026: Chennai Super Kings
- 2026: Kent

Career statistics
Competition	T20I	FC	LA	T20
Matches	5	20	21	39
Runs scored	83	1,220	900	750
Batting average	27.66	45.18	52.94	37.50
100s/50s	0/0	3/7	3/4	0/2
Top score	21*	127*	128	80*
Balls bowled	6	1,945	515	244
Wickets	0	30	18	14
Bowling average	–	38.23	26.27	26.14
5 wickets in innings	–	0	1	0
10 wickets in match	–	0	0	0
Best bowling	–	3/54	6/48	3/25
Catches/stumpings	1/–	17/–	9/–	19/–
- Source: ESPNcricinfo, 4 June 2026

Dian Forrester (born 7 June 2000) is a South African international cricketer who plays as an all-rounder. He is a left-handed batter and right-arm fast bowler. He made his Twenty20 International debut for South Africa against New Zealand on 15 March 2026.

== Domestic career ==
Forrester began his professional career with the Knights, making his List A debut in the 2023 CSA One-Day Cup, where he scored a century and took a five-wicket haul in his first match.

He made his first-class debut in the 2023–24 CSA 4-Day Series and later played Twenty20 cricket in the CSA T20 competition.

In 2025, he moved to North West and was also selected for South Africa A.

In May 2026, Forrester signed a contract with Kent County Cricket Club to play in that year's T20 Blast.

In May 2026, Forrester was signed by Chennai Super Kings as an injury replacement for Jamie Overton.

== International career ==
In March 2026, Forrester was selected in South Africa's T20I squad and made his debut against New Zealand.
