= Petrus Burger =

Namibian cricketer (born 1999)

Personal information
- Born: 3 November 1999 (age 27)
- Source: Cricinfo, 25 August 2017

Petrus Burger (born 3 November 1999) is a Namibian cricketer.

== Biography ==
He made his Twenty20 debut for Namibia in the 2017 Africa T20 Cup on 25 August 2017. Prior to his Twenty20 debut, he was part of Namibia's squad for the 2016 Under-19 Cricket World Cup.

He made his first-class debut for Namibia against the United Arab Emirates in the 2015–17 ICC Intercontinental Cup on 16 September 2017. He made his List A debut for Namibia, also against the United Arab Emirates, in the 2015–17 ICC World Cricket League Championship on 21 September 2017.

In October 2017, he was named in Namibia's squad for the 2018 Under-19 Cricket World Cup. Following Namibia's matches in the tournament, the International Cricket Council (ICC) named Burger as the rising star of the squad. He was the leading wicket-taker for Namibia in the tournament, with 8 wickets. In January 2018, he was named in Namibia's squad for the 2018 ICC World Cricket League Division Two tournament.
