= Grant Martin (cricketer) =

South African cricketer (born 1999)

Personal information
- Born: 26 June 1999 (age 27)
- Source: Cricinfo, 11 November 2018

Grant Martin (born 26 June 1999) is a South African cricketer. He made his List A debut for North West in the 2018–19 CSA Provincial One-Day Challenge on 11 November 2018.
