= Luke Philander =

South African cricketer (born 1997)

Personal information
- Born: May 1997 (age 29)
- Source: Cricinfo, 25 August 2017

Luke Philander (born May 1997) is a South African cricketer. He made his Twenty20 debut for Western Province in the 2017 Africa T20 Cup on 25 August 2017. Prior to his Twenty20 debut, he was part of South Africa's squad for the 2016 Under-19 Cricket World Cup. He made his List A debut for Western Province in the 2017–18 CSA Provincial One-Day Challenge on 26 November 2017. He made his first-class debut for Western Province in the 2018–19 CSA 3-Day Provincial Cup on 17 January 2019.

In September 2019, he was named in Western Province's squad for the 2019–20 CSA Provincial T20 Cup.
