= Mpumelelo Xulu =

South African cricketer (born 1999)

Personal information
- Born: 28 January 1999 (age 27)
- Source: Cricinfo, 17 March 2019

Mpumelelo Xulu (born 28 January 1999) is a South African cricketer. He made his List A debut for KwaZulu-Natal Inland in the 2018–19 CSA Provincial One-Day Challenge on 17 March 2019.
