= Shaakir Abrahams =

South African cricketer (born 1994)

Personal information
- Born: 15 April 1994 (age 32); Port Elizabeth, South Africa
- Source: Cricinfo, 18 November 2018

Shaakir Abrahams (born 15 April 1994) is a South African cricketer. He made his List A debut for Boland in the 2018–19 CSA Provincial One-Day Challenge on 18 November 2018.
