= Joshua Dodd =

South African cricketer (born 1996)

Personal information
- Born: 24 February 1996 (age 30)
- Source: Cricinfo, 13 January 2019

Joshua Dodd (born 24 February 1996) is a South African cricketer. He made his List A debut for Border in the 2018–19 CSA Provincial One-Day Challenge on 4 November 2018. He made his first-class debut for Border in the 2018–19 CSA 3-Day Provincial Cup on 31 January 2019. He made his Twenty20 debut for Border in the 2019–20 CSA Provincial T20 Cup on 13 September 2019.
