= Todd Walker (cricketer) =

South African cricketer (born 1998)

Personal information
- Born: 13 March 1998 (age 28)
- Source: Cricinfo, 12 March 2017

Todd Walker (born 13 March 1998) is a South African cricketer. He made his List A debut for South Western Districts in the 2016–17 CSA Provincial One-Day Challenge on 12 March 2017. He made his first-class debut for South Western Districts in the 2016–17 Sunfoil 3-Day Cup on 23 March 2017. He made his Twenty20 debut for South Western Districts in the 2017 Africa T20 Cup on 25 August 2017.
