= Sizwe Zulu =

South African cricketer (born 1996)

Personal information
- Born: 12 April 1996 (age 30)
- Source: Cricinfo, 25 August 2017

Sizwe Zulu (born 12 April 1996) is a South African cricketer. He made his List A debut for Easterns in the CSA Provincial One-Day Challenge on 5 March 2016. He made his Twenty20 debut for Easterns in the 2017 Africa T20 Cup on 25 August 2017.
