= Jean Strydom =

South African cricketer (born 1995)

Personal information
- Born: 3 April 1995 (age 31)
- Source: Cricinfo, 25 August 2017

Jean Strydom (born 3 April 1995) is a South African cricketer. He made his Twenty20 debut for Western Province in the 2017 Africa T20 Cup on 25 August 2017.
