= Roger Arendse =

South African cricketer (born 1993)

Personal information
- Born: 5 August 1993 (age 33); Secunda, South Africa
- Source: ESPNcricinfo, 17 October 2016

Roger Arendse (born 5 August 1993) is a South African cricketer. He made his first-class debut for Northerns in the 2012–13 CSA Provincial Three-Day Competition on 8 November 2012. He made his Twenty20 debut for Northerns in the 2017 Africa T20 Cup on 2 September 2017.
