= Meeka-eel Prince =

South African cricketer (born 2004)

Personal information
- Full name: Meeka-eel Prince
- Born: 5 April 2004 (age 22)
- Batting: Right-handed
- Role: Wicket-keeper, Batter

Domestic team information
- Years: Team
- 2023–present: North West

Career statistics
Competition	FC	LA	T20
Matches	7	11	26
Runs scored	266	414	532
Batting average	22.16	37.63	24.18
100s/50s	0/2	1/1	0/3
Top score	64	166	83*
Catches/stumpings	22/1	10/2	17/5
- Source: Cricinfo, 6 February 2025

Meeka-eel Prince (born 5 April 2004) is a South African cricketer. He plays for North West in domestic cricket.

== Career ==
He made his List A debut against Western Province in the 2023 CSA One-Day Cup on 16 September 2023. He made his Twenty20 debut for South Africa under-19 team against Easterns on 30 September 2023 in the CSA Provincial T20 Cup.

Prince signed a rookie contract with North West in March 2023. He scored his first century (166 off 140) in List A game against Boland in October 2023. He made his first-class debut against Warriors on 4 November 2023 in the 2023–24 CSA 4-Day Series.

In August 2024, he was named in South Africa A cricket team against Sri Lanka A cricket team for the unofficial ODIs.

In February 2025, Prince was named in the squad for the ODI squad for the Tri-Series in Pakistan.
