= Hershell America =

South African cricketer (born 1994)

Personal information
- Born: 17 February 1994 (age 32); Oudtshoorn, South Africa
- Source: Cricinfo, 17 February 2018

Hershell America (born 17 February 1994) is a South African cricketer. He made his first-class debut for South Western Districts in the 2017–18 Sunfoil 3-Day Cup on 15 February 2018. He made his List A debut for South Western Districts in the 2018–19 CSA Provincial One-Day Challenge on 28 October 2018. He made his Twenty20 debut on 24 September 2021, for South Western Districts in the 2021–22 CSA Provincial T20 Knock-Out tournament.
