= Thamsanqa Rapelego =

South African cricketer (born 1992)

Personal information
- Born: 25 December 1992 (age 33)
- Source: Cricinfo, 10 February 2019

Thamsanqa Rapelego (born 25 December 1992) is a South African cricketer. He made his List A debut for Gauteng in the 2018–19 CSA Provincial One-Day Challenge on 10 February 2019. In April 2021, he was named in Limpopo's squad, ahead of the 2021–22 cricket season in South Africa.
