= Mtabozuko Nqam =

South African cricketer (born 1995)

Personal information
- Born: 11 July 1995 (age 31)
- Source: Cricinfo, 14 September 2018

Mtabozuko Nqam (born 11 July 1995) is a South African cricketer. He made his Twenty20 debut for Northern Cape in the 2018 Africa T20 Cup on 14 September 2018. He made his List A debut for Northern Cape in the 2018–19 CSA Provincial One-Day Challenge on 21 October 2018. He made his first-class debut for Northern Cape in the 2018–19 CSA 3-Day Provincial Cup on 1 November 2018. In September 2019, he was named in Eastern Province's squad for the 2019–20 CSA Provincial T20 Cup.
