= Kenan Smith =

South African cricketer (born 1999)

Personal information
- Born: 9 March 1999 (age 27)
- Source: Cricinfo, 9 March 2017

Kenan Smith (born 9 March 1999) is a South African cricketer. He made his first-class debut for Eastern Province in the 2016–17 Sunfoil 3-Day Cup on 9 March 2017. In December 2017, he was named in South Africa's squad for the 2018 Under-19 Cricket World Cup.

He made his List A debut for Eastern Province in the 2018–19 CSA Provincial One-Day Challenge on 14 October 2018. In September 2019, he was named in Eastern Province's squad for the 2019–20 CSA Provincial T20 Cup. He made his Twenty20 debut for Eastern Province in the 2019–20 CSA Provincial T20 Cup on 14 September 2019.
