= Siphamandla Krweqe =

South African cricketer (born 2000)

Personal information
- Born: 6 October 2000 (age 26)
- Source: Cricinfo, 30 March 2019

Siphamandla Krweqe (born 6 October 2000) is a South African cricketer. He made his List A debut for Border in the 2018–19 CSA Provincial One-Day Challenge on 30 March 2019.
