= Marco de Kock =

South African cricketer (born 1997)

Personal information
- Born: 1 May 1997 (age 29)
- Source: Cricinfo, 27 October 2018

Marco de Kock (born 1 May 1997) is a South African cricketer. He made his first-class debut for South Western Districts in the 2018–19 CSA 3-Day Provincial Cup on 25 October 2018. He made his List A debut for South Western Districts in the 2018–19 CSA Provincial One-Day Challenge on 28 October 2018.
