= Petrus du Plessis (cricketer) =

South African cricketer (born 1996)

Personal information
- Born: 19 November 1996 (age 29)
- Source: Cricinfo, 31 March 2019

Petrus du Plessis (born 19 November 1996) is a South African cricketer. He made his List A debut for Free State in the 2018–19 CSA Provincial One-Day Challenge on 31 March 2019.
