= Juan Landsberg =

South African cricketer (born 1996)

Personal information
- Born: 15 February 1996 (age 30)
- Source: Cricinfo, 14 September 2018

Juan Landsberg (born 15 February 1996) is a South African cricketer. He made his Twenty20 debut for Gauteng in the 2018 Africa T20 Cup on 14 September 2018. He made his List A debut for Gauteng in the 2018–19 CSA Provincial One-Day Challenge on 7 October 2018. He made his first-class debut for Gauteng in the 2018–19 CSA 3-Day Provincial Cup on 18 October 2018.
