= Keenan Vieira =

South African cricketer (born 1997)

Personal information
- Born: 1 November 1997 (age 29)
- Source: Cricinfo, 23 March 2019

Keenan Vieira (born 1 November 1997) is a South African cricketer. He made his first-class debut for Eastern Province in the 2018–19 CSA 3-Day Provincial Cup on 21 March 2019. He made his List A debut for Eastern Province in the 2018–19 CSA Provincial One-Day Challenge on 24 March 2019.
