= Kyle Jacobs (cricketer) =

South African cricketer (born 1998)

Personal information
- Born: 20 April 1998 (age 28)
- Source: Cricinfo, 2 March 2019

Kyle Jacobs (born 20 April 1998) is a South African cricketer. He made his first-class debut for Border in the 2018–19 CSA 3-Day Provincial Cup on 28 February 2019. He made his List A debut for Border in the 2018–19 CSA Provincial One-Day Challenge on 3 March 2019. He made his Twenty20 debut on 4 October 2021, for Warriors in the 2021–22 CSA Provincial T20 Knock-Out tournament.
