= 2024–25 Pakistan Tri-Nation Series =

Cricket tournament in 2025

- Date: 8–14 February 2025
- Location: Pakistan
- Result: New Zealand won the series
- Player of the series: Salman Ali Agha (Pak)
Teams
Pakistan	New Zealand	South Africa
Captains
Mohammad Rizwan	Mitchell Santner	Temba Bavuma
Most runs
Salman Ali Agha (219)	Kane Williamson (225)	Matthew Breetzke (233)
Most wickets
Shaheen Afridi (6)	Will O'Rourke (6)	Wiaan Mulder (2); Senuran Muthusamy (2)

The 2024–25 Pakistan Tri-Nation Series was a cricket tournament that took place in Pakistan in February 2025. It was a tri-nation series involving Pakistan, New Zealand and South Africa cricket teams, with the matches played as One Day International (ODI) fixtures. The series was used as preparation ahead of the 2025 ICC Champions Trophy. It was the first tri-nation series hosted by Pakistan since 2004.

On 8 January 2025, Pakistan Cricket Board (PCB) relocated the Tri-Nation Series to the Gaddafi Stadium in Lahore and the National Stadium in Karachi. Originally the series was supposed take place at the Multan Cricket Stadium in Multan.

== Squads ==
Pakistan	New Zealand	South Africa
Mohammad Rizwan (c, wk); Shaheen Afridi; Salman Ali Agha; Abrar Ahmed; Faheem Ashraf; Babar Azam; Kamran Ghulam; Mohammad Hasnain; Usman Khan; Haris Rauf; Khushdil Shah; Naseem Shah; Saud Shakeel; Tayyab Tahir; Fakhar Zaman	Mitchell Santner (c); Tom Latham (wk); Michael Bracewell; Mark Chapman; Devon Conway; Jacob Duffy; Lockie Ferguson; Matt Henry; Daryl Mitchell; Will O'Rourke; Glenn Phillips; Rachin Ravindra; Ben Sears; Nathan Smith; Kane Williamson; Will Young	Temba Bavuma (c); Aiden Markram (vc); Corbin Bosch; Eathan Bosch; Matthew Breetzke; Junior Dala; Tony de Zorzi; ~~Gerald Coetzee~~; Marco Jansen; Heinrich Klaasen (wk); Keshav Maharaj; David Miller; Mihlali Mpongwana; Senuran Muthusamy; Wiaan Mulder; Lungi Ngidi; ~~Anrich Nortje~~; Gideon Peters; Meeka-eel Prince; Kagiso Rabada; Ryan Rickelton (wk); Tabraiz Shamsi; Jason Smith; Tristan Stubbs; Rassie van der Dussen; Kyle Verreynne (wk)

On 15 January, Anrich Nortje was ruled out of the tournament due to a back injury. On 31 January, New Zealand added Jacob Duffy into the squad for the series. On 5 February, South Africa added Gerald Coetzee into the squad for the series, but was ruled out later with a tight groin.

== Points table ==
Pos	Team	Pld	W	L	NR	Pts	NRR	Qualification
1	New Zealand	2	2	0	0	4	0.906	Advanced to the final
2	Pakistan (H)	2	1	1	0	2	−0.689	Advanced to the final
3	South Africa	2	0	2	0	0	−0.228	

Source: ESPNcricinfo
(H) Host

== Group stage ==
=== 1st ODI ===
8 February 2025
14:00 UTC+5 (D/N)
Scorecard

New Zealand; 330/6 (50 overs)	v	Pakistan; 252 (47.5 overs)
Glenn Phillips 106* (74); Shaheen Afridi 3/88 (10 overs)		Fakhar Zaman 84 (69); Mitchell Santner 3/41 (10 overs)

New Zealand won by 78 runs
Gaddafi Stadium, Lahore
Umpires: Faisal Afridi (Pak) and Michael Gough (Eng)
Player of the match: Glenn Phillips (NZ)

- New Zealand won the toss and elected to bat.
- Ben Sears (NZ) made his ODI debut.
- Glenn Phillips (NZ) scored his maiden century in ODIs.

=== 2nd ODI ===
10 February 2025
09:30 UTC+5
Scorecard

South Africa; 304/6 (50 overs)	v	New Zealand; 308/4 (48.4 overs)
Matthew Breetzke 150 (148); Matt Henry 2/59 (10 overs)		Kane Williamson 133* (113); Senuran Muthusamy 2/50 (8.4 overs)

New Zealand won by 6 wickets
Gaddafi Stadium, Lahore
Umpires: Richard Illingworth (Eng) and Rashid Riaz (Pak)
Player of the match: Kane Williamson (NZ)

- New Zealand won the toss and elected to field.
- Eathan Bosch, Matthew Breetzke, Mihlali Mpongwana, and Senuran Muthusamy (SA) all made their ODI debuts.
- Matthew Breetzke (SA) scored his maiden century in ODIs. His score was the highest score by a debutant in ODIs.
- Kane Williamson (NZ) scored his 7,000th run in ODIs.
- This was New Zealand's highest successful run chase against South Africa in ODIs.

=== 3rd ODI ===
12 February 2025
14:00 UTC+5 (D/N)
Scorecard

South Africa; 352/5 (50 overs)	v	Pakistan; 355/4 (49 overs)
Heinrich Klaasen 87 (56); Shaheen Afridi 2/66 (10 overs)		Salman Ali Agha 134 (103); Wiaan Mulder 2/79 (10 overs)

Pakistan won by 6 wickets
National Stadium, Karachi
Umpires: Michael Gough (Eng) and Asif Yaqoob (Pak)
Player of the match: Salman Ali Agha (Pak)

- South Africa won the toss and elected to bat.
- Heinrich Klaasen (SA) scored his 2,000th run in ODIs.
- Salman Ali Agha (Pak) scored his maiden century in ODIs.
- The 260-run partnership between Salman Ali Agha and Mohammad Rizwan was Pakistan's highest 4th-wicket partnership in ODIs.
- This was Pakistan's highest successful run chase in ODIs.

== Final ==
14 February 2025
14:00 UTC+5 (D/N)
Scorecard

Pakistan; 242 (49.3 overs)	v	New Zealand; 243/5 (45.2 overs)
Mohammad Rizwan 46 (76); Will O'Rourke 4/43 (9.3 overs)		Daryl Mitchell 57 (58); Naseem Shah 2/43 (8 overs)

New Zealand won by 5 wickets
National Stadium, Karachi
Umpires: Richard Illingworth (Eng) and Ahsan Raza (Pak)
Player of the match: Will O'Rourke (NZ)

- Pakistan won the toss and elected to bat.
- Babar Azam (Pak) scored his 6,000th run in ODIs, becoming the joint-fastest to do so (123 innings).
- Will O'Rourke (NZ) was named as the Player of the Match for taking 4 wickets for 43 runs.
- Salman Ali Agha (Pak) was named as the Player of the Series for scoring 219 runs.
