= Dinura Kalupahana =

Sri Lankan cricketer

Personal information
- Born: 16 June 2005 (age 21)
- Batting: Right-handed
- Bowling: Right arm medium
- Role: All Rounder

Domestic team information
- Years: Team
- 2023–present: Sinhalese Sports Club

Career statistics
Competition	FC	LA	T20
Matches	12	11	11
Runs scored	337	143	45
Batting average	25.92	35.75	7.50
100s/50s	0/3	0/0	0/0
Top score	57*	45*	31*
Balls bowled	806	228	72
Wickets	16	5	3
Bowling average	42.12	52.80	34.33
5 wickets in innings	0	0	0
10 wickets in match	0	0	0
Best bowling	3/16	2/23	1/14
Catches/stumpings	5/–	2/–	1/–
- Source: Cricinfo, 1 April 2025

Dinura Kalupahana (born 16 June 2005) is a Sri Lankan cricketer who has captained the Sri Lanka national under-19 cricket team.

== Career ==
Dinura hails from a middle income family and pursued an interest in cricket at the very young age of three. His parents, after acknowledging his keen interest in cricket, supported him to realize his passion for the sport. His parents helped him to enroll at the Panadura Cricket Academy, where he eventually honed his skills and techniques from his G. Ranasinghe, as the latter turned out to be his first coach. Sumith Prasanna, one of the coaches at the Royal College in Panadura, apparently spotted Dinura's talent at the Panadura Cricket Academy and Sumith convinced Dinura to join the Royal Panadura under-13 cricket team. Dinura accepted the offer and joined the Royal Panadura under-13 cricket team, for whom he turned out to play in domestic matches for a duration of four years.

His cricketing prowess was flourished when he switched to Mahinda College, Galle in 2019. He went onto represent Mahinda College in all age groups including under-13, under-15 and under-17 categories, while he also featured in the Mahinda College's first XI team for five years which also consisted of three big match encounters against Richmond College, as the encounters between Mahinda College and Richmond College are popularly dubbed as the Lovers’ Quarrel encounter.

He scored a bulk of runs in a provincial tournament organized by Sri Lanka Cricket in collaboration with the Sri Lanka School Cricket Association. He scored three half centuries in four innings, and his rich vein of form with the bat during the tournament, along with his bowling performances, showcased his abilities as an all-rounder, and it impressed the selectors, which propelled him to inch closer to be rewarded a spot in the Sri Lankan national under-19 setup. He received his maiden call-up to the Sri Lankan under-19 camp in 2023. He was named in Sri Lankan squad for the 2023 ACC Under-19 Asia Cup which was held in the United Arab Emirates.

He made his T20 debut playing for Sinhalese Sports Club against Kurunegala Youth Cricket Club on 28 May 2023. He made his first-class debut playing for Sinhalese Sports Club against Galle Cricket Club on 23 June 2023 during the Major League Tournament. He made his List A debut playing for Sinhalese Sports Club against Panadura Sports Club on 30 December 2023 at the Major Clubs Limited Over Tournament.

In September 2023, in a four-day unofficial youth test held at Rangiri Dambulla International Stadium, against the West Indies under-19 cricket team, he batted in the middle order and scored 150 runs after facing 229 deliveries. In January 2024, he was named in Sri Lanka's squad for the 2024 ICC Under-19 Cricket World Cup which was held in South Africa. He ended up the 2024 Under-19 Cricket World Cup, as Sri Lanka's leading run scorer with an aggregate of 196 runs, including three half-centuries, averaging 39.20 in five matches.

In June 2024, he was appointed as the captain of the Sri Lankan under-19 team for the tour of England to play against England under-19 cricket team. In August 2024, he was named in Sri Lanka A squad for their tour of South Africa to play against South Africa A side in two first-class matches and three List A matches.

In October 2024, he was adjudged as the Schoolboy Cricketer of the Year. In October 2024, he was included in Sri Lanka A squad for the 2024 ACC Emerging Teams Asia Cup and was a key member of the side which emerged as runners-up to Afghanistan A.
