= Hanco Olivier =

South African cricketer (born 1995)

Personal information
- Born: 17 October 1995 (age 31)
- Batting: Left-handed
- Bowling: Right-arm off break
- Source: ESPNcricinfo, 4 September 2016

Hanco Olivier (born 17 October 1995) is a South African first-class cricketer. He is a right-handed batsman and a Right arm off break bowler.

Olivier made his First Class debut for North West against Western Province on 7 January 2016. He made his List A debut for Free State in the 2018–19 CSA Provincial One-Day Challenge on 31 March 2019.
