= Nikhil Prem =

South African cricketer (born 1999)

Personal information
- Born: 4 August 1999 (age 27)
- Source: Cricinfo, 23 February 2019

Nikhil Prem (born 4 August 1999) is a South African cricketer. He made his first-class debut for KwaZulu-Natal in the 2018–19 CSA 3-Day Provincial Cup on 21 February 2019. He made his List A debut for KwaZulu-Natal in the 2018–19 CSA Provincial One-Day Challenge on 24 February 2019.
