= Jhedli van Briesies =

South African cricketer (born 2001)

- van Briesies in 2026

Personal information
- Born: 15 July 2001 (age 25)
- Batting: Right-handed
- Bowling: Right-arm Offbreak
- Role: Batter, Part-time Wicket-keeper

Career statistics
Competition	FC	List A	T20
Matches	33	28	24
Runs scored	1328	708	363
Batting average	26.56	26.22	21.35
100s/50s	2/4	1/4	0/1
Top score	122*	107	52
Catches/stumpings	58/3	17/2	8/1
- Source: Cricinfo, 19 October 2026

Jhedli van Briesies (born 15 July 2001) is a South African cricketer. He made his first-class debut on 16 January 2020, for South Western Districts in the 2019–20 CSA 3-Day Provincial Cup. He made his List A debut on 26 January 2020, for South Western Districts in the 2019–20 CSA Provincial One-Day Challenge. In April 2021, he was named in South Western Districts' squad, ahead of the 2021–22 cricket season in South Africa. He made his Twenty20 debut on 26 September 2021, for South Western Districts in the 2021–22 CSA Provincial T20 Knock-Out tournament.

On 23 June 2024, he scored 141 not out for the Hinton Charterhouse Sunday (development) side against Old England Cricket Club. James Black top scored for Old England with a gutsy 64.

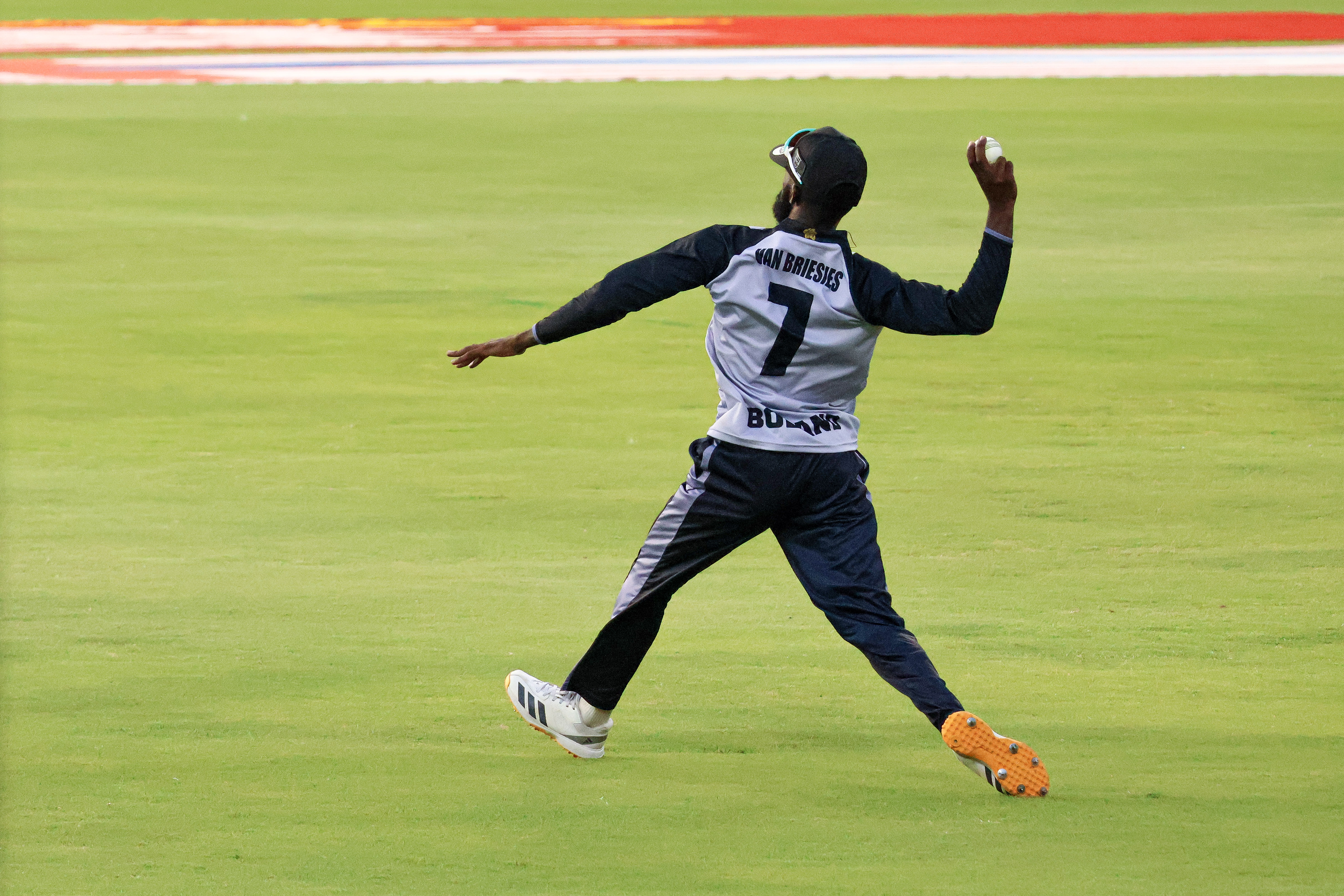
Jhedli van Briesies playing for Boland
