= Luke Schlemmer =

South African cricketer (born 1995)

Personal information
- Full name: Luke Allen Schlemmer
- Born: 25 January 1995 (age 31); Durban, South Africa
- Batting: Right-handed
- Bowling: Slow left-arm orthodox
- Source: Cricinfo, 20 October 2016

Luke Schlemmer (born 25 January 1995) is a South African professional cricketer. He made his first-class debut for KwaZulu-Natal Inland in the 2016–17 Sunfoil 3-Day Cup on 20 October 2016. He made his List A debut for KwaZulu-Natal Inland in the 2016–17 CSA Provincial One-Day Challenge on 27 November 2016. He made his Twenty20 debut for KwaZulu-Natal Inland in the 2018 Africa T20 Cup on 15 September 2018.

He was the leading run-scorer for KwaZulu-Natal Inland in the 2018–19 CSA 3-Day Provincial Cup, with 602 runs in nine matches. He was also the leading run-scorer for KwaZulu-Natal Inland in the 2018–19 CSA Provincial One-Day Challenge, with 344 runs in ten matches. In April 2021, he was named in KwaZulu-Natal Inland's squad, ahead of the 2021–22 cricket season in South Africa.
