= Matt Montgomery (cricketer) =

German cricketer

Personal information
- Full name: Matthew Montgomery
- Born: 10 May 2000 (age 26); Johannesburg, Gauteng, South Africa
- Batting: Right-handed
- Bowling: Right-arm off break
- Role: Batsman

International information
- National side: Germany
- Only T20I (cap 41): 28 July 2023 v Italy

Domestic team information
- Years: Team
- 2018/19: KwaZulu-Natal
- 2021–2025: Nottinghamshire (squad no. 14)
- 2025: → Derbyshire (on loan)
- 2026–: Derbyshire (squad no. 21)

Career statistics
Competition	T20I	FC	LA	T20
Matches	1	38	42	57
Runs scored	13	1,821	1,587	949
Batting average	13.00	29.37	46.67	22.06
100s/50s	0/0	2/8	3/9	0/4
Top score	13	178	114	74*
Balls bowled	18	552	552	568
Wickets	0	6	9	30
Bowling average	–	59.50	60.77	27.10
5 wickets in innings	–	0	0	0
10 wickets in match	–	0	0	0
Best bowling	–	1/0	2/38	4/30
Catches/stumpings	0/–	36/–	19/–	26/–
- Source: Cricinfo, 27 September 2026

Matthew Montgomery (born 10 May 2000) is a German cricketer who was born in South Africa.

== Career ==
Known mainly for his batting skills, he made his Twenty20 debut for KwaZulu-Natal in the 2018 Africa T20 Cup on 15 September 2018. In January 2019, he was named as the captain of the South Africa national under-19 cricket team, ahead of their tour to India. He made his first-class debut for KwaZulu-Natal in the 2018–19 CSA 3-Day Provincial Cup on 17 January 2019.

He made his List A debut for KwaZulu-Natal in the 2018–19 CSA Provincial One-Day Challenge on 20 January 2019, scoring a century. He was the leading run-scorer for KwaZulu-Natal in the tournament, with 221 runs in four matches.

Montgomery joined Nottinghamshire as a trialist in 2019 while studying at nearby Loughborough University. After impressing in the second XI, he signed his first professional contract with the club in 2021. Montgomery made his County Championship debut in July 2022, going on to score 369 runs in eight First Class innings that season, including a career-best 178 against Durham, as the club won Division Two and earning himself a new three-year contract.

In August 2025, it was announced that Montgomery would join Derbyshire on loan after agreeing a three-year contract to move to the club from the end of the season.
