= Mpilo Njoloza =

South African cricketer (born 1988)

Personal information
- Full name: Mpilo Buqa Njoloza
- Born: 20 December 1988 (age 37); East London, South Africa
- Source: ESPNcricinfo, 1 September 2016

Mpilo Njoloza (born 20 December 1988) is a South African cricketer. He was included in the Western Province squad for the 2016 Africa T20 Cup. In September 2018, he was named in Western Province's squad for the 2018 Africa T20 Cup. He was the leading wicket-taker in the 2018–19 CSA Provincial One-Day Challenge, with 24 dismissals in eight matches.
