= Khwezi Gumede =

South African cricketer (born 1999)

Personal information
- Born: 19 June 1999 (age 27)
- Source: Cricinfo, 24 March 2019

Khwezi Gumede (born 19 June 1999) is a South African cricketer. He made his List A debut for KwaZulu-Natal in the 2018–19 CSA Provincial One-Day Challenge on 24 March 2019. He made his first-class debut for KwaZulu-Natal in the 2018–19 CSA 3-Day Provincial Cup on 28 March 2019. In September 2019, he was named in Easterns' squad for the 2019–20 CSA Provincial T20 Cup. He made his Twenty20 debut for Easterns in the 2019–20 CSA Provincial T20 Cup on 13 September 2019. In April 2021, he was named in Easterns' squad, ahead of the 2021–22 cricket season in South Africa.
