= Jesse Albanie =

South African cricketer (born 1999)

Personal information
- Born: 6 August 1999 (age 27); Worcester, South Africa
- Source: Cricinfo, 3 November 2019

Jesse Albanie (born 6 August 1999) is a South African cricketer. He made his List A debut on 3 November 2019, for North West in the 2019–20 CSA Provincial One-Day Challenge. He made his first-class debut on 25 November 2021, for North West in the 2021–22 CSA 4-Day Series.
