= Danie Rossouw (cricketer) =

South African cricketer (born 1995)

Personal information
- Born: 16 May 1995 (age 31)
- Source: Cricinfo, 25 February 2021

Danie Rossouw (born 16 May 1995) is a South African cricketer. He made his first-class debut on 22 February 2021, for Easterns in the 2020–21 CSA 3-Day Provincial Cup. He made his List A debut on 28 February 2021, for Easterns in the 2020–21 CSA Provincial One-Day Challenge. He made his Twenty20 debut on 8 October 2021, for Easterns in the 2021–22 CSA Provincial T20 Knock-Out tournament.
