= Gregory Mahlokwana =

South African cricketer

Personal information
- Full name: Gregory Nkale Mahlokwana
- Born: 14 December 1994 (age 31); Pretoria, Gauteng, South Africa
- Batting: Left-handed
- Bowling: Slow left-arm orthodox
- Role: Bowler

Domestic team information
- Years: Team
- 2016/17–2020/21: Northerns
- 2016/17–2020/21: Titans
- 2019: Cape Town Blitz
- 2021/22: Free State

Career statistics
Competition	FC	LA	T20
Matches	8	28	35
Runs scored	138	96	43
Batting average	17.25	13.71	6.14
100s/50s	0/1	0/0	0/0
Top score	51	30	18
Balls bowled	1,015	1,368	607
Wickets	15	36	23
Bowling average	32.73	28.13	31.34
5 wickets in innings	0	0	0
10 wickets in match	0	0	0
Best bowling	3/110	4/22	2/11
Catches/stumpings	4/–	9/–	5/–
- Source: ESPNcricinfo, 23 January 2023

Gregory Nkale Mahlokwana (born 14 December 1994) is a South African cricketer. He made his List A debut for Northerns in the 2016–17 CSA Provincial One-Day Challenge on 12 February 2017. He made his Twenty20 debut for Northerns in the 2017 Africa T20 Cup on 1 September 2017. He made his first-class debut for Northerns in the 2017–18 Sunfoil 3-Day Cup on 14 December 2017.

In September 2018, he was named in Northerns' squad for the 2018 Africa T20 Cup. In September 2018, he was named in the Titans' squad for the 2018 Abu Dhabi T20 Trophy. He was the leading wicket-taker for Northerns in the 2018–19 CSA Provincial One-Day Challenge, with 18 dismissals in eight matches.

In September 2019, he was named in the squad for the Cape Town Blitz team for the 2019 Mzansi Super League tournament. In April 2021, Mahlokwana was named in the South Africa Emerging Men's squad for their six-match tour of Namibia. Later the same month, he was named in Free State's squad, ahead of the 2021–22 cricket season in South Africa.
