= Farhaan Sayanvala =

South African cricketer (born 1997)

Personal information
- Born: 8 July 1997 (age 29); Johannesburg, South Africa
- Source: ESPNcricinfo, 23 September 2016

Farhaan Sayanvala (born 8 July 1997) is a South African cricketer. He made his Twenty20 debut for Gauteng against Eastern Province in the 2016 Africa T20 Cup on 23 September 2016. Prior to his T20 debut he was named in South Africa's squad for the 2016 Under-19 Cricket World Cup.

He made his List A debut for Gauteng in the 2016–17 CSA Provincial One-Day Challenge on 15 January 2017. He made his first-class debut for Gauteng in the 2017–18 Sunfoil 3-Day Cup on 12 October 2017.

In September 2018, he was named in Northern Cape's squad for the 2018 Africa T20 Cup. He was the leading run-scorer for Northern Cape in the 2018–19 CSA Provincial One-Day Challenge, with 215 runs in eight matches. In September 2019, he was named in Northern Cape's squad for the 2019–20 CSA Provincial T20 Cup.
