= Gareth Dukes =

South African cricketer (born 1992)

Personal information
- Born: 9 November 1992 (age 34)
- Source: ESPNcricinfo, 4 November 2016

Gareth Dukes (born 9 November 1992) is a South African cricketer. He made his first-class debut for South Western Districts in the 2012–13 CSA Provincial Three-Day Competition on 21 February 2013.

He was the leading wicket-taker in the 2017–18 CSA Provincial One-Day Challenge tournament for KwaZulu-Natal Inland, with 12 dismissals in eight matches. In September 2018, he was named in KwaZulu-Natal Inland's squad for the 2018 Africa T20 Cup. He was the leading wicket-taker for KwaZulu-Natal Inland in the 2018–19 CSA Provincial One-Day Challenge, with 17 dismissals in ten matches.
