= Matthew Breetzke =

South African cricketer (born 1998)

Personal information
- Full name: Matthew Paul Breetzke
- Born: 3 November 1998 (age 28); Port Elizabeth, Eastern Cape, South Africa
- Batting: Right-handed
- Bowling: Right-arm medium
- Role: Batter

International information
- National side: South Africa (2023–present)
- Test debut (cap 367): 21 October 2024 v Bangladesh
- Last Test: 28 June 2025 v Zimbabwe
- ODI debut (cap 156): 10 February 2025 v New Zealand
- Last ODI: 30 September 2026 v Australia
- T20I debut (cap 99): 3 September 2023 v Australia
- Last T20I: 1 November 2025 v Pakistan

Domestic team information
- Years: Team
- 2016/17–present: Eastern Province
- 2017/18–2020/21: Warriors
- 2019: Nelson Mandela Bay Giants
- 2023–present: Durban's Super Giants
- 2024–present: Northamptonshire
- 2025: Lucknow Super Giants

Career statistics
Competition	Test	ODI	T20I	FC
Matches	5	17	13	67
Runs scored	65	881	158	3,903
Batting average	9.28	58.73	13.16	36.13
100s/50s	0/0	2/6	0/1	10/18
Top score	43	150	51	188
Balls bowled	–	–	–	303
Wickets	–	–	–	2
Bowling average	–	–	–	90.00
5 wickets in innings	–	–	–	0
10 wickets in match	–	–	–	0
Best bowling	–	–	–	1/13
Catches/stumpings	3/–	6/–	7/–	42/–
- Source: ESPNcricinfo, 19 November 2026

Matthew Paul Breetzke (born 3 November 1998) is a South African cricketer. He made his international debut for the South Africa national cricket team in September 2023 and has played all three formats of the game for the team.

Born in Port Elizabeth in 1998 and educated at Grey High School, Breetzke has played domestically for Eastern Province since 2017.

== Domestic career ==
Breetzke made his first-class debut for Eastern Province in the 2016–17 Sunfoil 3-Day Cup on 9 February 2017 and his List A debut in the 2016–17 CSA Provincial One-Day Challenge on 12 February. He made his Twenty20 debut in the 2017 Africa T20 Cup on 1 September the same year.

In December 2017, he was named in South Africa's squad for the 2018 Under-19 Cricket World Cup. In July 2018, he was named in the Cricket South Africa Emerging Squad and in September 2018, was named in Eastern Province's squad for the 2018 Africa T20 Cup. In September 2019, he was named in the squad for the Nelson Mandela Bay Giants team for the 2019 Mzansi Super League tournament.

In April 2021, Breetzke was named in the South Africa Emerging Men's squad for their six-match tour of Namibia. Later the same month, he was named in Eastern Province's squad, ahead of the 2021–22 cricket season in South Africa.

== International career ==
Breetzke made his international debut in a Twenty20 International (T20I) match against Australia in September 2023. He played in two T20Is against the touring Indians in December 2023, before touring the West Indies with the South African T20I squad in May 2024.

Later in 2024 he made his Test match debut against Bangladesh, playing in the first Test of the two-match series during South Africa's tour in October. He was dismissed for a duck in his only innings of the match.

In February 2025, Breetzke was named in the squad for the Tri-Series in Pakistan. He made his One Day International debut on 10 February against New Zealand during a tri-series in Pakistan ahead of the 2025 ICC Champions Trophy. He scored a century on his debut, making 150 runs, setting a new record for the highest score on debut in an ODI debut, surpassing the 148 made by West Indian Desmond Haynes in 1978. During his second ODI on 12 February he scored 83 runs, setting a new record for the most number of runs by any batsman after their first two ODI innings.

In August 2025, during the second ODI against Australia at Mackay's Great Barrier Reef Arena, Breetzke scored 88 runs off 78 balls. This innings marked his fourth consecutive fifty-plus score in ODIs since his debut, making him the first player in ODI history to achieve such a feat. This performance surpassed the previous record held by Navjot Singh Sidhu, who had four fifties across five matches.

Breetzke's consistent performances have significantly contributed to South Africa's success in the series, with the team securing an 84-run victory in the second ODI, thereby clinching the three-match series 2-1.

In September 2025, he was named in the Proteas T20I squad for their tour of Pakistan, as well as named captain of the ODI squad in the absence of regular skipper Temba Bavuma.

== International centuries ==
ODI centuries by Matthew Breetzke
No.	Runs	Balls	Innings	Against	Venue	Country	Date	Result
1	150	148	1	New Zealand	Gaddafi Stadium, Lahore	Pakistan	10 February 2025	New Zealand won by 6 wickets
2	112	106	1	Australia	Kingsmead Cricket Ground, Durban	South Africa	24 September 2026	South Africa won by 67 runs
