= 2022–23 CSA T20 Challenge =

Cricket tournament

- Dates: 17 October – 5 November 2022
- Administrator: Cricket South Africa
- Cricket format: Twenty20
- Tournament format(s): Round-robin and knockout
- Host: South Africa
- Champions: Titans (6th title)
- Runners-up: Dolphins
- Participants: 8
- Matches: 31
- Most runs: Grant Roelofsen (333)
- Most wickets: Bamanye Xenxe (18)

The 2022–23 CSA T20 Challenge was a Twenty20 cricket tournament that took place in South Africa during October and November 2022. It was the nineteenth season of the CSA T20 Challenge, established by Cricket South Africa. It took place from 17 October to 5 November 2022.

Rocks were the defending champions.

In the final, Titans beat Dolphins by 4 wickets to win the tournament.

== Teams ==
Team	City	Captain	Coach
GBETS ROCKS (Boland)	Paarl	(South Africa) Pieter Malan	(South Africa) Jean-Paul Duminy
HOLLYWOODBETS Dolphins	Durban	Prenelan Subrayen	Imraan Khan
DP WORLD LIONS	Johannesburg	Malusi Siboto	Wandile Makwetu
Knights	Bloemfontein	Aubrey Swanepoel	Jean-Pierre Triegaardt
North West DRAGONS	Potchefstroom	Heino Kuhn	Craig Alexander
MOMENTUM MULTIPLY Titans	Centurion	Sibonelo Makhanya	Mandla Mashimbyi
Warriors	Gqeberha	Wihan Lubbe	(South Africa) Robin Peterson
Western Province	Cape Town	Tony de Zorzi	Salieg Nackerdien

== Squads ==
Dolphins	Lions	Knights	North West	Rocks (Boland)	Titans	Warriors	Western Province
Sarel Erwee; Eathan Bosch; Grant Roelofsen; Jon Jon Smuts; Jason Smith; Keegan Petersen; Daryn Dupavillon; Andile Simelane; Thando Ntini; Tshepang Dithole; Marques Ackerman; Prenelan Subrayen; Ottneil Baartman; Bryce Parsons; Khaya Zondo	Pieter Malan; Janneman Malan; Clyde Fortuin; Micheal Copeland; Ferisco Adams; Achille Cloete; Hardus Viljoen; Farhaan Behardien; Leus Du Plooy; Shaun Von Berg; Imraan Manack; Khwezi Gumede; Bamanye Xenxe; Christiaan Jonker; Valentine Kitime	Gerald Coetzee; Migael Pretorius; Gihahn Cloete; Jacques Snyman; Joshua Cobb; Aubrey Swanepoel; Patrick Kruger; Pite van Biljon; Alfred Mothoa; Mbulelo Budaza; Mbongi Mhlanga; Nealan van Heerden; Nathan Roux; Orapeleng Motlhoaring; Raynard Van Tonder	Heino Kuhn; Eldred Hawken; Lesego Senokwane; Delano Potgieter; Shaylen Piilay; Senuran Muthusamy; Renaldo Meyer; Lwandiswa Zuma; Duan Jansen; Grant Makoena; Caleb Seleka; Kerwin Mungroo; Wesley Marshall; Khanya Cotani; Hardus Coetser	Pieter Malan, Janneman Malan, Clyde Fortuin, Micheal Copeland, Ferisco Adams, Achille Cloete, Hardus Viljoen, Farhaan Behardien, Leus Du Plooy, Shaun Von Berg, Imraan Manack, Khwezi Gumede, Bamanye Xenxe, Christiaan Jonker, Valentine Kitime.	Sibonelo Makhanya, Neil Brand, Theunis de Bruyn, Aaron Phangiso, Dean Elgar, Corbin Bosch, Aya Gqamane, Dayyaan Galiem, Donovan Ferreira, Junior Dala, Jiveshen Pillay, Simon Harmer, Dewald Brevis, Matthew Boast, Musa Twala.	Rudi Second, Sine Qeshile, Diego Rosier, Wihan Lubbe, Ziyaad Abrahams, Mthiwekhaya Nabe, Akhona Mnyaka, Tiaan Van Vuuren, Beyers Swanepoel, Lesiba Ngoepe, Kgaudise Molefe, Tsepo Ndwandwa, Matthew Breetzke, Glenton Stuurman, Jordan Hermann.	Abdallah Bayoumy, Aviwe Mgijima, Beuran Hendricks, Dane Paterson, Daniel Smith, Gavin Kaplan, George Linde, Jonathan Bird, Junaid Dawood, Kyle Simmonds, Kyle Verreynne, Mihlali Mpongwana, Nandre Burger, Tony De Zorzi, Tshepo Moreki.

== Points table ==
Pos	Team	Pld	W	L	NR	Pts	NRR
1	Titans	7	6	1	0	26	1.430
2	Dolphins	7	4	2	1	20	1.974
3	Boland	7	4	2	1	18	0.551
4	Knights	7	2	2	3	15	−0.011
5	Lions	7	2	3	2	13	−0.383
6	Warriors	7	2	3	2	12	−1.536
7	North West	7	2	5	0	8	−0.578
8	Western Province	7	1	5	1	6	−1.889

Source: ESPN Cricinfo

Advanced to the Finals

== Fixtures ==
Match 1
17 October 2022
14:30
Scorecard

Titans; 168/6 (20 overs)	v	Dolphins; 134 (18.4 overs)
Dewald Brevis 57 (44); Eathan Bosch 2/13 (4 overs)		Grant Roelofsen 68 (42); Aaron Phangiso 3/16 (3.4 overs)

Titans won by 34 runs
JB Marks Oval, Potchefstroom
Umpires: Shaun George and Abdoellah Steenkamp
Player of the match: Dewald Brevis (Titans)

- Dolphins won the toss and elected to field.

Match 2
17 October 2022
18:00 (N)
Scorecard

Lions; 174/6 (20 overs)	v	North West; 175/6 (19.1 overs)
Wiaan Mulder 55 (41); Delano Potgieter 2/29 (4 overs)		Senuran Muthusamy 60* (29); Lutho Sipamla 2/38 (3 overs)

North West won by 4 wickets
JB Marks Oval, Potchefstroom
Umpires: Arno Jacobs and Abongile Sodumo
Player of the match: Senuran Muthusamy (North West)

- North West won the toss and elected to field.
- Tetelo Maphaka (Lions) made his T20 debut.

Match 3
18 October 2022
14:30
Scorecard

Warriors; 134/9 (20 overs)	v	Knights; 21/3 (2.5 overs)
Jordan Hermann 67* (45); Aubrey Swanepoel 3/27 (4 overs)		Jacques Snyman 7* (3); Glenton Stuurman 2/10 (1.5 overs)

No result
JB Marks Oval, Potchefstroom
Umpires: Mazizi Gampu and Phillip Vosloo

- Knights won the toss and elected to field.
- No further play was possible due to rain.
- Jordan Hermann (Warriors) made his T20 debut.

Match 4
18 October 2022
18:00 (N)
Scorecard

Western Province; 155/7 (20 overs)	v	Boland; 159/5 (16.1 overs)
George Linde 39 (38); Ferisco Adams 2/20 (4 overs)		Janneman Malan 60 (43); Tshepo Moreki 2/24 (3 overs)

Boland won by 5 wickets
JB Marks Oval, Potchefstroom
Umpires: Shaun George and Allahudien Paleker
Player of the match: Janneman Malan (Boland)

Match 5
19 October 2022
14:30
Scorecard

Titans; 190/6 (20 overs)	v	Lions; 119 (20 overs)
Jiveshan Pillay 61 (44); Lutho Sipamla 2/42 (4 overs)		Evan Jones 33 (30); Dewald Brevis 2/19 (4 overs)

Titans won by 71 runs
JB Marks Oval, Potchefstroom
Umpires: Arno Jacobs and Abdoellah Steenkamp
Player of the match: Jiveshan Pillay (Titans)

- Lions won the toss and elected to field.
- Muhammad Manack (Lions) made his T20 debut.

Match 6
19 October 2022
18:00 (N)
Scorecard

Dolphins; 163/5 (20 overs)	v	North West; 133/9 (20 overs)
Khaya Zondo 42* (40); Kerwin Mungroo 2/32 (4 overs)		Wesley Marshall 25 (19); Ottniel Baartman 3/30 (4 overs)

Dolphins won by 30 runs
JB Marks Oval, Potchefstroom
Umpires: Allahudien Paleker and Phillip Vosloo
Player of the match: Jason Smith (Dolphins)

- North West won the toss and elected to field.

Match 7
20 October 2022
14:30
Scorecard

Western Province; 116 (18.5 overs)	v	Knights; 119/1 (13.5 overs)
Kyle Verreynne 35 (21); Gerald Coetzee 4/22 (3.5 overs)		Gihahn Cloete 68* (42); Tshepo Moreki 1/16 (2 overs)

Knights won by 9 wickets
JB Marks Oval, Potchefstroom
Umpires: Mazizi Gampu and Abongile Sodumo
Player of the match: Gerald Coetzee (Knights)

- Western Province won the toss and elected to field.

Match 8
20 October 2022
18:00 (N)
Scorecard

Warriors; 165/4 (20 overs)	v	Boland; 162/6 (20 overs)
Matthew Breetzke 61* (33); Hardus Viljoen 1/29 (4 overs)		Janneman Malan 68* (52); Ziyaad Abrahams 3/35 (4 overs)

Warriors won by 3 runs
JB Marks Oval, Potchefstroom
Umpires: Abdoellah Steenkamp and Phillip Vosloo
Player of the match: Ziyaad Abrahams (Warriors)

- Boland won the toss and elected to field.

Match 9
21 October 2022
14:30
Scorecard

Titans; 108/7 (13 overs)	v	Western Province; 95/8 (13 overs)
Jiveshan Pillay 37 (24); Mihlali Mpongwana 3/14 (2 overs)		George Linde 36 (29); Simon Harmer 2/15 (3 overs)

Titans won by 16 runs (DLS method)
JB Marks Oval, Potchefstroom
Umpires: Arno Jacobs and Shaun George
Player of the match: Jiveshan Pillay (Titans)

- Titans won the toss and elected to bat.
- The match was reduced to 13 overs per side due to rain.

Match 10
21 October 2022
18:00 (N)
Scorecard

Warriors; 106/4 (17 overs)	v	Lions; 100/3 (10.3 overs)
Lesiba Ngoepe 32(24); Evan Jones 2/20 (4 overs)		Wiaan Mulder 31* (21); Wihan Lubbe 1/7 (1 over)

Lions won by 7 wickets (DLS method)
JB Marks Oval, Potchefstroom
Umpires: Allahudien Paleker and Abdoellah Steenkamp
Player of the match: Cameron Delport (Lions)

- Lions won the toss and elected to field.
- The match was reduced to 17 overs per side due to rain.
- The second innings was reduced to 14 overs due to rain and Lions were set a revised target of 100 in 14 overs.

Match 11
22 October 2022
10:00
Scorecard

Dolphins; 136/7 (20 overs)	v	Boland; 87/3 (11.2 overs)
Grant Roelofsen 66 (48); Bamanye Xenxe 3/21 (4 overs)		Farhaan Behardien 24* (18); Eathan Bosch 2/17 (3 overs)

Boland won by 7 wickets (DLS method)
JB Marks Oval, Potchefstroom
Umpires: Abongile Sodumo and Phillip Vosloo
Player of the match: Bamanye Xenxe (Boland)

- Boland won the toss and elected to field.
- The second innings was reduced to 12 overs due to rain and Boland were set a revised target of 87 in 12 overs.

Match 12
22 October 2022
14:30
Scorecard

North West; 134/8 (20 overs)	v	Titans; 135/5 (17.3 overs)
Duan Jansen 41 (27); Junior Dala 2/31 (4 overs)		Dewald Brevis 40 (28); Caleb Seleka 3/29 (4 overs)

Titans won by 5 wickets
JB Marks Oval, Potchefstroom
Umpires: Mazizi Gampu and Arno Jacobs
Player of the match: Theunis de Bruyn (Titans)

- North West won the toss and elected to bat.
- Musawenkosi Twala (Titans) made his T20 debut.

Match 13
23 October 2022
10:00
Scorecard

Knights; 158/9 (20 overs)	v	Lions
Patrick Kruger 60 (36); Evan Jones 2/22 (4 overs)

No result
JB Marks Oval, Potchefstroom
Umpires: Allahudien Paleker and Abongile Sodumo

- Lions won the toss and elected to field.
- No further play was possible due to rain.
- Mbongiseni Mhlanga and Nathan Roux (Knights) both made their T20 debuts.

Match 14
23 October 2022
14:30
Scorecard

Warriors	v	Western Province

Match abandoned
JB Marks Oval, Potchefstroom
Umpires: Mazizi Gampu and Shaun George

- No toss.
- No play was possible due to rain.

Match 15
25 October 2022
14:30
Scorecard

Dolphins; 194/4 (20 overs)	v	Warriors; 68 (13.2 overs)
Grant Roelofsen 91 (49); Wihan Lubbe 1/4 (1 overs)		Matthew Breetzke 27* (28); Ottniel Baartman 5/14 (2.2 overs)

Dolphins won by 123 runs
JB Marks Oval, Potchefstroom
Umpires: Bongani Jele and Brad White
Player of the match: Ottniel Baartman (Dolphins)

- Dolphins won the toss and elected to bat.
- Rudi Second replaced Beyers Swanepoel as a concussion substitute for Warriors during second innings.

Match 16
25 October 2022
18:00 (N)
Scorecard

Boland; 121/8 (20 overs)	v	Titans; 103/7 (17 overs)
Farhaan Behardien 63* (51); Junior Dala 3/20 (4 overs)		Dayyaan Galiem 25 (21); Bamanye Xenxe 3/20 (3 overs)

Boland won by 4 runs (DLS method)
JB Marks Oval, Potchefstroom
Umpires: Lubabalo Gcuma and Stephen Harris
Player of the match: Bamanye Xenxe (Boland)

- Titans won the toss and elected to field.
- The second innings was reduced to 17 overs due to floodlight failure and Titans were set a revised target of 108 in 17 overs.

Match 17
26 October 2022
14:30
Scorecard

Lions; 163/6 (20 overs)	v	Dolphins; 167/1 (18.2 overs)
Mitchell Van Buuren 42 (29); Daryn Dupavillon 3/30 (4 overs)		Keegan Petersen 73* (51); Codi Yusuf 1/26 (4 overs)

Dolphins won by 9 wickets
JB Marks Oval, Potchefstroom
Umpires: Siphelele Gasa and Ryan Hendricks
Player of the match: Keegan Petersen (Dolphins)

- Lions won the toss and elected to bat.

Match 18
26 October 2022
18:00 (N)
Scorecard

Knights; 179/6 (20 overs)	v	Boland; 175 (19.4 overs)
Jacques Snyman 53 (30); Bamanye Xenxe 4/30 (4 overs)		Michael Copeland 36 (21); Gerald Coetzee 4/36 (4 overs)

Knights won by 4 runs
JB Marks Oval, Potchefstroom
Umpires: Bongani Jele and Dennis Smith
Player of the match: Jacques Snyman (Knights)

- Boland won the toss and elected to field.

Match 19
27 October 2022
18:00 (N)
Scorecard

Western Province; 164/5 (18 overs)	v	North West; 137/6 (18 overs)
Daniel Smith 69 (46); Duan Jansen 2/26 (4 overs)		Senuran Muthusamy 39* (25); Dane Paterson 2/28 (4 overs)

Western Province won by 27 runs
JB Marks Oval, Potchefstroom
Umpires: Lubabalo Gcuma and Ryan Hendricks
Player of the match: Daniel Smith (Western Province)

- North West won the toss and elected to field.
- The match was reduced to 18 overs per side due to rain.
- Lwando Tywaku (Western Province) made his T20 debut.

Match 20
28 October 2022
14:30
Scorecard

Warriors; 119/7 (20 overs)	v	Titans; 120/8 (19.3 overs)
Jordan Hermann 27 (33); Aaron Phangiso 4/23 (4 overs)		Dayyaan Galiem 29* (27); Glenton Stuurman 2/19 (4 overs)

Titans won by 2 wickets
JB Marks Oval, Potchefstroom
Umpires: Stephen Harris Dennis Smith
Player of the match: Aaron Phangiso (Titans)

- Warriors won the toss and elected to bat.

Match 21
28 October 2022
18:00 (N)
Scorecard

Knights; 100/9 (17.1 overs)	v	Dolphins
Jacques Snyman 32 (17); JJ Smuts 2/15 (4 overs)

No result
JB Marks Oval, Potchefstroom
Umpires: Siphelele Gasa and Brad White

- Dolphins won the toss and elected to field.
- No further play was possible due to rain.

Match 22
29 October 2022
10:00
Scorecard

North West; 150/5 (20 overs)	v	Boland; 134/5 (15.1 overs)
Heino Kuhn 58 (44); Bamanye Xenxe 2/32 (4 overs)		Clyde Fortuin 57 (29); Caleb Seleka 2/22 (4 overs)

Boland won by 5 wickets (DLS method)
JB Marks Oval, Potchefstroom
Umpires: Lubabalo Gcuma and Bongani Jele
Player of the match: Clyde Fortuin (Boland)

- Boland won the toss and elected to field.
- The second innings was reduced to 17 overs due to rain and Boland were set a revised target of 131 in 17 overs.

Match 23
29 October 2022
14:30
Scorecard

Western Province; 73 (18 overs)	v	Dolphins; 76/3 (9.4 overs)
George Linde 30 (33); JJ Smuts 3/12 (4 overs)		Grant Roelofsen 29* (30); Nandre Burger 1/10 (2 overs)

Dolphins won by 7 wickets
JB Marks Oval, Potchefstroom
Umpires: Stephen Harris and Ryan Hendricks
Player of the match: Grant Roelofsen (Dolphins)

- Western Province won the toss and elected to bat.
- Kyle Simmonds replaced Lwando Tywaku as a concussion substitute for Western Province during first innings.

Match 24
30 October 2022
14:30
Scorecard

Warriors; 166/4 (20 overs)	v	North West; 156/7 (20 overs)
Diego Rosier 53* (41); Jan Coetzer 2/21 (3 overs)		Wesley Marshall 56 (35); Glenton Stuurman 2/26 (4 overs)

Warriors won by 10 runs
JB Marks Oval, Potchefstroom
Umpires: Stephen Harris and Brad White
Player of the match: Wesley Marshall (North West)

- Warriors won the toss and elected to bat.

Match 25
31 October 2022
14:30
Scorecard

Titans; 271/3 (20 overs)	v	Knights; 230/9 (20 overs)
Dewald Brevis 162 (57); Migael Pretorius 1/41 (4 overs)		Gihahn Cloete 51 (32); Neil Brand 3/28 (4 overs)

Titans won by 41 runs
JB Marks Oval, Potchefstroom
Umpires: Dennis Smith and Brad White
Player of the match: Dewald Brevis (Titans)

- Knights won the toss and elected to field.
- Dewald Brevis (Titans) scored his maiden century in T20s.

Match 26
31 October 2022
18:00 (N)
Scorecard

Lions; 160/8 (20 overs)	v	Western Province; 128/9 (20 overs)
Wiaan Mulder 52 (34); Tshepo Moreki 4/22 (4 overs)		Mihlali Mpongwana 43 (29); Codi Yusuf 2/15 (4 overs)

Lions won by 32 runs
JB Marks Oval, Potchefstroom
Umpires: Siphelele Gasa and Bongani Jele
Player of the match: Wiaan Mulder (Lions)

- Western Province won the toss and elected to field.

Match 27
1 November 2022
14:30
Scorecard

North West; 154/6 (20 overs)	v	Knights; 132 (16.4 overs)
Heino Kuhn 50 (47); Gerald Coetzee 2/24 (4 overs)		Migael Pretorius 36 (15); Caleb Seleka 3/13 (4 overs)

North West won by 22 runs
JB Marks Oval, Potchefstroom
Umpires: Lubabalo Gcuma and Siphelele Gasa
Player of the match: Caleb Seleka (North West)

- Knights won the toss and elected to field.

Match 28
1 November 2022
18:00 (N)
Scorecard

Lions	v	Boland

No result
JB Marks Oval, Potchefstroom
Umpires: Mazizi Gampu and Dennis Smith

- Lions won the toss and elected to field.
- No play was possible due to rain.
- Connor Esterhuizen (Lions) made his T20 debut.

== Finals ==
Semi-finals
1	Titans	158/6 (20 overs)
4	Knights	120/8 (20 overs)
2	Dolphins	146 (19.4 overs)
3	Boland	126/8 (20 overs)

Final
SFW1	Titans	165/6 (19.4 overs)
SFW2	Dolphins	162/3 (20 overs)

=== Semi-finals ===
1st semi-final
2 November 2022
14:30
Scorecard

Titans; 158/6 (20 overs)	v	Knights; 120/8 (20 overs)
Sibonelo Makhanya 45 (34); Gerald Coetzee 3/28 (4 overs)		Jacques Snyman 33 (28); Neil Brand 3/24 (4 overs)

Titans won by 38 runs
JB Marks Oval, Potchefstroom
Umpires: Siphelele Gasa and Stephen Harris
Player of the match: Sibonelo Makhanya (Titans)

- Titans won the toss and elected to bat.

2nd semi-final
2 November 2022
18:00 (N)
Scorecard

Dolphins; 146 (19.4 overs)	v	Boland; 126/8 (20 overs)
Grant Roelofsen 26 (30); Bamanye Xenxe 4/34 (3.4 overs)		Janneman Malan 37 (39); Prenelan Subrayen 3/18 (4 overs)

Dolphins won by 20 runs
JB Marks Oval, Potchefstroom
Umpires: Lubabalo Gcuma and Brad White
Player of the match: Prenelan Subrayen (Dolphins)

- Boland won the toss and elected to field.

Final
5 November 2022
14:30
Scorecard

Dolphins; 162/3 (20 overs)	v	Titans; 165/6 (19.4 overs)
JJ Smuts 69 (50); Neil Brand 1/26 (3 overs)		Donavon Ferreira 40 (25); JJ Smuts 2/25 (3 overs)

Titans won by 4 wickets
JB Marks Oval, Potchefstroom
Umpires: Lubabalo Gcuma and Stephen Harris
Player of the match: Donavon Ferreira (Titans)

- Dolphins won the toss and elected to bat.
