= Connor Esterhuizen =

South African cricketer

Personal information
- Full name: Connor Esterhuizen
- Born: 31 May 2001 (age 25); Johannesburg, South Africa
- Batting: Right-handed
- Role: Top order batsman

International information
- National side: South Africa
- ODI debut (cap 166): 9 September 2026 v Namibia
- Last ODI: 13 September 2026 v Namibia
- T20I debut (cap 115): 15 March 2026 v New Zealand
- Last T20I: 6 September 2026 v Zimbabwe
- T20I shirt no.: 68

Domestic team information
- Years: Team
- 2022–present: Lions
- 2023: Abu Dhabi Knight Riders
- 2024–2025: MI Cape Town
- 2026: Pretoria Capitals

Career statistics
Competition	T20I	FC	LA	T20
Matches	5	21	13	44
Runs scored	200	1295	381	926
Batting average	50.00	49.80	47.62	28.93
100s/50s	0/2	4/4	0/3	0/5
Top score	75	203	87*	75
Catches/stumpings	8/–	71/1	10/1	29/1
- Source: ESPNcricinfo, 25 March 2026

Connor Esterhuizen (born 31 May 2001) is a South African international cricketer, who is a right-handed batsman. He made his debut for South Africa in a Twenty20 International (T20I) against New Zealand on 15 March 2026. He plays for Lions in domestic cricket.

== Early years ==
Esterhuizen was born in Johannesburg and attended St. John's College where he stood out at age group level. He also represented the Wits University First XI where he scored a truck load of runs which earned him a spot in the Lions Academy side.

== Career ==
He made his List A debut for Lions on 27 March 2022, against Dolphins in the 2021–22 CSA One-Day Cup. He scored 52 runs off 58 balls in his List A debut match. He made his Twenty20 debut for Lions on 1 November 2022, against Boland in the 2022–23 CSA T20 Challenge.

He made his first-class debut on 26 February 2023, against Western Province in the 2022–23 CSA 4-Day Series. In February 2023, he was signed by Abu Dhabi Knight Riders to play for them in the 2023 International League T20. In September 2023, he was selected to play for MI Cape Town, following the players' draft to play for them in the 2023–24 SA20. In December 2023, he was named in South Africa A's squad for their first-class series against India A.

Esterhuizen made his international debut on 15 March 2026 when selected for South Africa's T20I series in New Zealand. He scored 45 not out on his debut and added two fifties during the five T20Is leading him to be chosen as Player of the Series.
