= Western Province cricket team =

Cricket team

Western Province
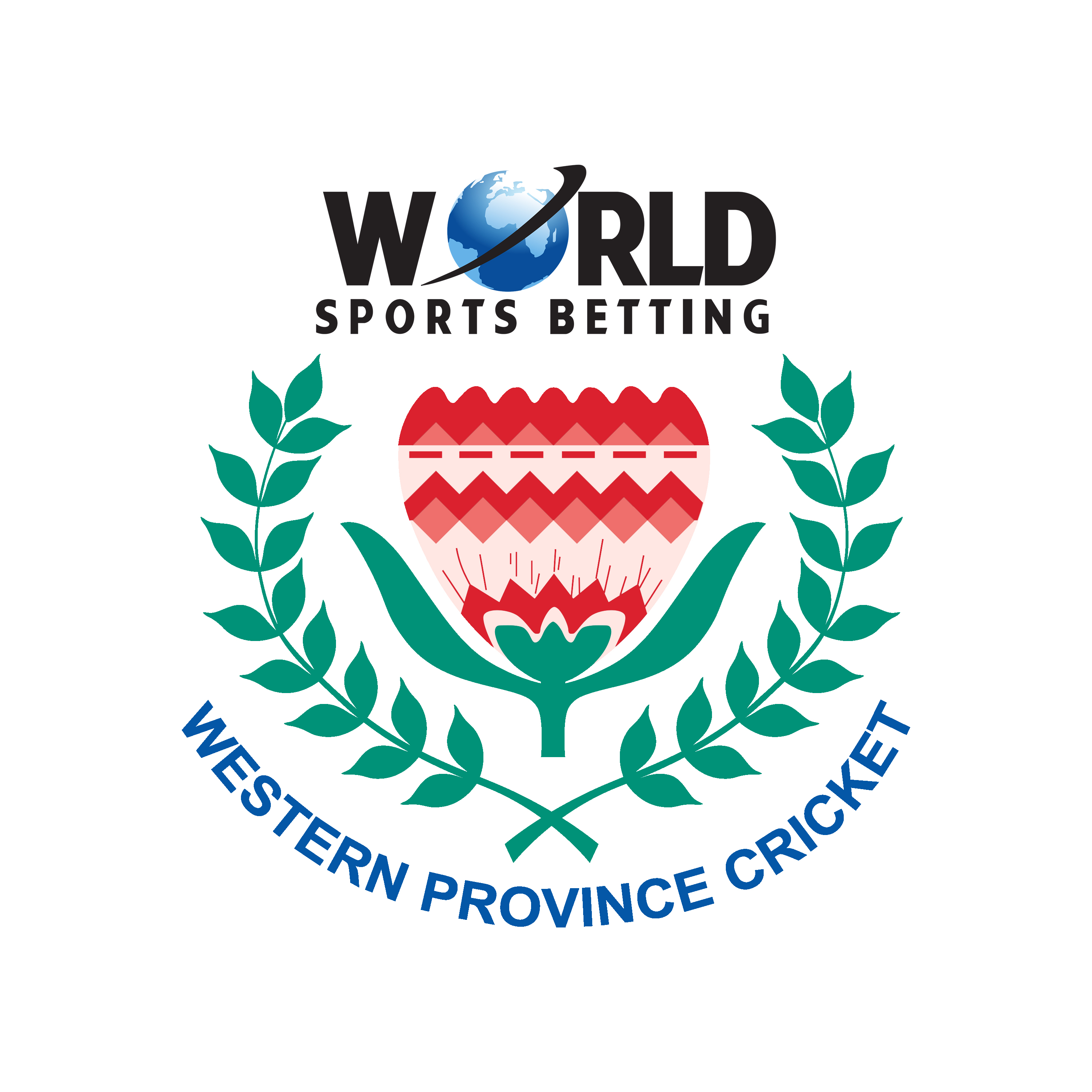

Personnel
- Captain: Daniel Smith
- Chief executive: Corrie Van Zyl

Team information
- Founded: October 1864
- Home ground: Newlands, Cape Town
- Capacity: 22,500

History
- First-class debut: Eastern Province in 1890/91
- First-Class Competition wins: Western Province:19 Outright and 3 Shared Cape Cobras:4 Outright
- One-Day Cup wins: Western Province:5 Cape Cobras:2 Outright and 2 Shared
- T20 Cup wins: Cape Cobras:2
- Official website: Official website
First-class
T20

Western Province is a professional Western Cape first-class cricket team which has been part of the South African domestic cricket structures since the 1890s. The team later restructured into the Cape Cobras which became part of the Cricket South Africa Franchise era from 2005 to 2021. The current Western Province Professional teams was re-formed in 2021/22 under the CSA domestic restructuring. Whereas many teams opted to keep their former franchise brands, Cape Cobras elected to return to their traditional name.

Western Province is one of South Africa's most successful cricket teams in the 21st century, having won the Currie Cup 18 times, with 3 shared trophies from 1892 to 2004. During the franchise era the Cape Cobras amassed 5 titles in the First Class, One Day Cup and T20 Challenge competitions from 2003 to 2022. The professional teams have since grown with the Western Province Women's team gaining professional status in 2024.

Western Province Cricket is based at the Iconic Newlands Cricket Ground dubbed the Heart of Cricket where cricketing legends such as Jacques Kallis, Vernon Philander, Hershelle Gibbs, Andrew Puttick and JP Duminy have all been part of the Western Province structures. During the franchise era the Cape Cobras incorporated Boland Park as a shared venue with Newlands Cricket Ground from 2002 to 2022.

Western Province Men currently compete in the CSA 4-Day Domestic Series, CSA One-Day Cup and the CSA T20 Challenge with the Women's professional team competing in the CSA W One Day Cup and CSA W Pro20.

== History ==
=== Cape Colony ===
Cricket in South Africa, like many other Commonwealth nations, was first introduced by the British when the Cape Colony was ceded to Great Britain by the Anglo-Dutch Treaty of 1814. By the middle of the 19th century, cricket was well established in Cape Town, with Cape Colony Schools adopting the game by the 1850s as the sport gradually expanding further inland by settlers. In 1862, an annual fixture called 'Mother Country v Colonial Born' was hosted for the first time in Cape Town, with popularity leading to the founding of Western Province Cricket Club in October 1864. In 1876, Port Elizabeth began the 'Champion Bat Tournament' between teams representing the major settlements of the Cape Colony, such as Cape Town, Grahamston, Kingwilliamstown and Port Elizabeth. The settlement-based format continued until the 1890–91 season when Western Province, Eastern Province and Griqualand took to the field for the first time instead.

=== Western Province Currie Cup ===
Sir Donald Currie, the founder of the Castle Shipping Line and the sponsor of the 1889 English tour, donated a trophy for the champions of the promising domestic competition. The 'Currie Cup' was first awarded to Kimberley, who had beaten Transvaal in the single match competition of 1889–90. From 1892 to 1893, the competition began to take the familiar form of province-based competition in a champion format, inspired by the English County Cricket structure.

Western Province joined the competition for the 1892–93 season, winning the Cup on its first attempt. The Currie Cup was not contested every year, and a total of fourteen seasons were contested between its inception and the First World War. Aside from an interruption during the Boer War, typically seasons were not held when the English team were touring. The competition took on several different formats, including a knock-out structure, and a round-robin followed by a challenge final against the previous year's winner; but in 1906–07, a round-robin league format was established, which would be unchanged until 1982–83. Between 1892–93 and 1912–13, Western Province won the Cup five times, being particularly dominate in the 1890s.

In the interwar years, again the Currie Cup was not competed every year. Largely due to travel constraints, the Cup was not held in seasons when there was a Test tour of South Africa. Of the 12 seasons played, Western Province won two in an era of Transvaal dominance. First-class cricket was later suspended upon the outset of the Second World War in 1939 as South Africa declared war on Germany.

Western Province won a further eight Cups between 1946 and 1991 in sporadic fashion, with the team failing to win the title at any point in the 1960s. At the end of the 1965–66 season, Western Province were relegated to the Second Division for the first time since the two division format was introduced in 1951. They would later be promoted back to the First Division for the 1969–70 season, going on to share the title with Transvaal. From 1972, the two division format was retained but promotion and relegation scrapped, with the top division remaining constant with five teams: Transvaal, Natal, Eastern Province, Western Province and Rhodesia. By this time the stronger provinces had begun fielding a 'B Team' in the lower division, although could not be promoted. From 1975, Western Province fielded a 'B Team' of their own, however the lower division eventually split away to form the 'Castle Bowl' – in essence a separate Currie Cup Second XI Competition.

The dominance of the Transvaal, Natal and Western Province finally came to a close after Eastern Province beat Transvaal at the end of the 1988–89 season. Prior to, the three teams had amongst them won 59 of the 60 Currie Cups contested, with the exception being Kimberley's win in 1890–91.

Western Province was largely immune to the political changes after 1994 that altered the domestic structure. Whereas many teams changed name, for instance Transvaal to Gauteng in 1997, Western Province continued until the Franchise Era of 2004–2021.

During this time, one-day cricket was included in the domestic structure, with its matches having List-A status. Western Province won five one-day titles between 1981–82 and 2003–04, with three being back to back between 1985 and 1988.

=== Franchise era ===
In 2004–05, the format of South African domestic cricket was changed entirely. The eleven provincial teams were rationalised into six entirely professional new teams, for all three formats. Western Province merged with Boland to form the Cape Cobras, being based in Cape Town. With the Currie Cup now called SuperSport Series for commercial reasons, the six new franchises were intended to create a stronger top-tier sides with a second-tier semi-professional tournament based around the old provincial teams.

Playing 17 first-class seasons, the Cape Cobras were the second most successful team behind Titans with 4 outright titles. In the one-day series, Cape Cobras managed two outright and two shared wins, the most recent being 2013–2014. A T20 league had also been devised for the domestic structure within South Africa, with Cape Cobras securing two title wins by 2021–22.

=== Recent history ===
In 2020, domestic cricket in South Africa was restructured once more and the six former franchise teams were dropped. In its place was a return to the more traditional two-division league format, with a total of fifteen professional teams competing. For this, the previously semi-professional provincial cricket competition was absorbed, effectively forming the league's second division. Promotion and relegation between the two divisions, not seen since the start of the franchise era in 2004, will return after the 2023–24 season. From 2019, provinces and cricket unions submitted bids to CSA to make a case to be considered for the top division for the initial two seasons. The bidding process was overseen by the Independent Evaluation Committee (IEE) who took into account a range of criteria, such as cricketing and financial operations, women's and age-group development, transformation policies and stadium infrastructure. Eight teams make up the first division, with 16 contracted players each, and seven teams the second division, with 11 contracted players each, taking the total number of professional players to 205.

Many of the provinces elected to keep their previous franchise branding, even with a return to the more traditional province defined structure. Of the First Division, only Cape Cobras elected to return to their former name of Western Province.

== Current squad ==
Squad for 2026/27 Season. Players in bold have played international cricket.

Name	Nationality	Birth date	Batting style	Bowling style	Notes
Batters
**David Bedingham**	South Africa	22 April 1994 (age 32)	Right-handed	Right-arm orthodox spin	National Contract
**Tony de Zorzi**	South Africa	28 August 1997 (age 29)	Left-handed	Right-arm orthodox spin	National Contract
Kashief Joseph	South Africa		Left-handed		High-performance Contract
Valentine Kitime	South Africa	19 April 2003 (age 23)	Right-handed	Right-arm seam	
**Edward Moore**	South Africa	17 March 1993 (age 33)	Left-handed	Right-arm orthodox spin	
Jiveshan Pillay	South Africa	January 18, 1999 (age 27)	Left-handed		
**Joshua Van Heerden**	South Africa Germany	January 26, 1998 (age 28)	Right-handed		
Wicket-keepers
Bongi Mfunelwa	South Africa	16 August 2004 (age 22)	Right-handed		High-performance Contract
Daniel Smith	South Africa	19 March 2002 (age 24)	Left-handed	Left-arm seam	
**Kyle Verreynne**	South Africa	12 May 1997 (age 29)	Right-handed	Right-arm orthodox spin	National Contract
All-rounders
Josh Breed	South Africa	20 March 1999 (age 27)	Right-handed	Right-arm wrist spin	
**George Linde**	South Africa	4 December 1991 (age 34)	Left-handed	Left-arm orthodox spin	
**Mihlali Mpongwana**	South Africa	15 May 2000 (age 26)	Right-handed	Right-arm seam	
Kyle Simmonds	South Africa	6 January 1994 (age 32)	Left-handed	Left-arm orthodox spin	
Oliver Whitehead	South Africa	January 18, 2005 (age 21)	Right-handed	Right-arm seam	
Bowlers
**Nandre Burger**	South Africa	11 August 1995 (age 31)	Left-handed	Left-arm seam	Player of National Interest
Raeeq Daniels	South Africa	April 29, 2006 (age 20)	Right-handed	Right-arm seam	
Mbulelo Dube	South Africa	March 31, 2005 (age 21)	Right-handed	Right-arm seam	
**Tshepo Moreki**	South Africa	October 7, 1993 (age 33)	Right-handed	Right-arm seam	
**Dane Paterson**	South Africa	4 April 1989 (age 37)	Right-handed	Right-arm seam	

== Coaching staff ==
Men's Team

Western Province Cricket Association is currently in the process of hiring a new head coach after Salieg Nackerdien has taken up the appointment of Tanzania Nation Team head coach at the conclusion of the 2024/25 season.

Former Western Province and Cape Cobras Captain Justin Kemp has been appointed as the bowling coach with Qaasim Adams appointed as the Batting coach, whilst Dieter Swanepoel has been appointed the new strength and conditioning coach after working with the Momentum Multiply Titans, Cape Cobras and WP semi-professional team. Brent Martin has joined the support staff as team physio in 2024, and Ryan Bailey has come in as fielding coach in 2024. Jevon Herandien completes the management team as the team and logistics coordinator.

Women's Team

Claire Terblanche is the current Head Coach of the Western Province Women's team. She has been in the role since 2021. The team has won 3 titles while Terblanche has been in charge.

== Youth cricket ==
The RPCs and Hubs programme plays a key role in identifying players from previously disadvantaged areas to be a part of an organised, high-performance environment within their communities and structures. This has the aim of reshaping the cricketing landscape and changing lives through developing the raw skills of kids from non-traditional feeder systems.

Western Province HUBS are as follows:

1. Tygerberg (RPC)
2. Khayelitsha (HUB)
3. Mitchells Plain (HUB)
4. Langa (HUB)
5. Victoria (HUB)
6. St Augustine (HUB)
7. Primrose (HUB)
8. Heidelberg (HUB)

== Playing kit ==
During the Momentum 1 Day Cup and 2016–17 CSA T20 Challenge, the Cobras played in blue shirts and trousers with slight yellow accents as well as orange and blue kits to represent their sponsor's corporate colours.

== Honours ==
- Currie Cup (18) – 1892–93, 1893–94, 1896–97, 1897–98, 1908–09, 1920–21, 1931–32, 1952–53, 1955–56, 1974–75, 1977–78, 1981–82, 1985–86, 1990–91, 1995–96, 1998–99, 2000–01, 2003–04; shared (3) – 1921–22, 1969–70, 1989–90
- One Day Cup (5) – 1985–86, 1986–87, 1987–88, 1990–91, 2002–03
- CSA 3-Day Cup (2) – 2010–11, 2013–14
- Gillette Cup/Nissan Shield (5) – 1969–70, 1970–71, 1972–73, 1981–82, 1988–89

== Venues ==
Venues have included:

- Newlands, Cape Town (main venue 1890–present)
- RJE Burt Oval, Cape Town (occasional venue Nov 1976 – Oct 1991)
- Boon Wallace Oval, Cape Town (occasional venue Dec 1985 – Jan 1992)
- PP Smit Stadium, Bellville, Cape Town (occasional venue Dec 1997 – Oct 2002)

== Sources ==
- South African Cricket Annual – various editions
- Wisden Cricketers' Almanack – various editions
