= Bongi Mfunelwa =

South African cricketer (born 2004)

Personal information
- Born: 16 August 2004 (age 20); Cape Town, South Africa
- Batting: Right-handed
- Role: wicketkeeper batsman

Domestic team information
- Years: Team
- Western Province
- Source: Cricinfo, 6 December 2024

Bongi Mfunelwa (born 16 August 2004) is a South African cricketer.

== Career ==
He made his first-class debut for Western Province against the Lions during the 2024–25 CSA 4-Day Series on 21 November 2024 at the Wanderers Stadium, Johannesburg.
