= South African cricket team in New Zealand in 2025–26 =

International cricket tour

| | New Zealand | South Africa |
- Dates: 15 – 25 March 2026
| Captains | Mitchell Santner (1st, 2nd and 3rd T20Is); James Neesham (4th and 5th T20Is) | Keshav Maharaj |

Twenty20 International series
- Results: South Africa won the 5-match series 3–2
| Most runs | Devon Conway (100) | Connor Esterhuizen (200) |
| Most wickets | Ben Sears (8) | Gerald Coetzee (8) |
- Player of the series: Connor Esterhuizen (SA)

The South Africa cricket team toured New Zealand in March 2026 to play the New Zealand cricket team. The tour consisted of five Twenty20 International (T20I) matches. In June 2025, the New Zealand Cricket (NZC) confirmed the fixtures for the tour, as a part of the 2025–26 home international season.

== Squads ==
| New Zealand | South Africa |
|---|---|
| Mitchell Santner (Note: Only for 1st, 2nd and 3rd T20Is) (c); James Neesham (Note: Only for 4th and 5th T20Is) (c); Katene Clarke; Josh Clarkson; Dane Cleaver (wk); Devon Conway (wk); Lockie Ferguson (Note: Only for 2nd and 3rd T20Is); Zak Foulkes; Bevon Jacobs; Kyle Jamieson; Nick Kelly; Tom Latham (wk); Jayden Lennox; Cole McConchie; Tim Robinson; Ben Sears; Nathan Smith; ~~Ish Sodhi~~ | Keshav Maharaj (c); Ottniel Baartman; ~~Eathan Bosch~~; Gerald Coetzee; Tony de Zorzi; Connor Esterhuizen; Dian Forrester; Jordan Hermann; Rubin Hermann (wk); George Linde; Nqobani Mokoena; Wiaan Mulder; Andile Simelane; Lutho Sipamla; Prenelan Subrayen; Jason Smith |

On 7 March, Eathan Bosch was ruled out of the series due to a hamstring injury, and Wiaan Mulder was named as his replacement.

On 16 March, Ish Sodhi was ruled out of the series due to thumb injury.

== T20I series ==
=== 1st T20I ===
15 March 2026
19:15 (N)
Scorecard

| New Zealand; 91 (14.3 overs) | v | South Africa; 93/3 (16.4 overs) |
| James Neesham 26 (21); Nqobani Mokoena 3/26 (3.3 overs) | | Connor Esterhuizen 45* (48); Zak Foulkes 1/8 (2 overs) |

South Africa won by 7 wickets
Bay Oval, Mount Maunganui
Umpires: Chris Brown (NZ) and Wayne Knights (NZ)
Player of the match: Nqobani Mokoena (SA)

- New Zealand won the toss and elected to bat.
- Nick Kelly (NZ), Connor Esterhuizen, Dian Forrester, Jordan Hermann and Nqobani Mokoena (SA) all made their T20I debuts.

=== 2nd T20I ===
17 March 2026
19:15 (N)
Scorecard

| New Zealand; 175/6 (20 overs) | v | South Africa; 107 (15.3 overs) |
| Devon Conway 60 (49); Wiaan Mulder 2/14 (2 overs) | | George Linde 33 (12); Ben Sears 3/14 (3 overs) |

New Zealand won by 68 runs
Seddon Park, Hamilton
Umpires: Chris Brown (NZ) and Shaun Haig (NZ)
Player of the match: Devon Conway (NZ)

- South Africa won the toss and elected to field.

=== 3rd T20I ===
20 March 2026
19:15 (N)
Scorecard

| South Africa; 136/9 (20 overs) | v | New Zealand; 137/2 (16.2 overs) |
| Nqobani Mokoena 26* (20); Mitchell Santner 2/21 (3 overs) | | Tom Latham 63* (55); Lutho Sipamla 1/26 (2.2 overs) |

New Zealand won by 8 wickets
Eden Park, Auckland
Umpires: Chris Brown (NZ) and Kim Cotton (NZ)
Player of the match: Lockie Ferguson (NZ)

- New Zealand won the toss and elected to field.

=== 4th T20I ===
22 March 2026
19:15 (N)
Scorecard

| South Africa; 164/5 (20 overs) | v | New Zealand; 145 (18.5 overs) |
| Connor Esterhuizen 57 (36); Kyle Jamieson 2/29 (4 overs) | | Tim Robinson 32 (22); Gerald Coetzee 3/31 (3.5 overs) |

South Africa won by 19 runs
Wellington Regional Stadium, Wellington
Umpires: Cory Black (NZ) and Wayne Knights (NZ)
Player of the match: Connor Esterhuizen (SA)

- South Africa won the toss and elected to bat.
- James Neesham captained New Zealand for the first time in T20Is.
- Katene Clarke (NZ) and Prenelan Subrayen (SA) both made their T20I debuts.

=== 5th T20I ===
25 March 2026
19:15 (N)
Scorecard

| South Africa; 187/4 (20 overs) | v | New Zealand; 154/8 (20 overs) |
| Connor Esterhuizen 75 (33); Ben Sears 2/36 (4 overs) | | Bevon Jacobs 36 (19); Gerald Coetzee 2/21 (4 overs) |

South Africa won by 33 runs
Hagley Oval, Christchurch
Umpires: Kim Cotton (NZ) and Wayne Knights (NZ)
Player of the match: Connor Esterhuizen (SA)

- New Zealand won the toss and elected to field.
