= Valentine Kitime =

South African cricketer (born 2003)

Sello Valentine Kitime (born April 19, 2003) is a South African cricketer from Potchefstroom. He is a right-handed batter.

His primary schooling was in Potchefstroom at Saints Christian School, before going to high school in Centurion, at Cornwall Hill College. While at Cornwall Hill, he represented Northerns at age-group level. This culminated in him representing South Africa at the 2022 Under-19 Cricket World Cup, playing four games and making 39 runs.

He is currently contracted with Western Province having debuted for them in the 2023/24 season. He made his first first class century for them in the 2025/26 season vs Kwa-Zulu-Natal. His first provincial team was Boland.
