= Daniel Smith (South African cricketer) =

South African cricketer (born 2002)

Personal information
- Born: 19 March 2002 (age 24); Cape Town, South Africa
- Batting: Left-handed
- Role: Wicketkeeper-batsman

Domestic team information
- Years: Team
- 2021/22–present: Western Province
- 2026: Pretoria Capitals

Career statistics
Competition	FC	LA	T20
Matches	26	23	24
Runs scored	1,709	407	556
Batting average	39.74	21.42	26.47
100s/50s	3/14	0/2	1/3
Top score	153	59	103*
Catches/stumpings	55/1	36/3	15/3
- Source: Cricinfo, 28 March 2026

Daniel Smith (born 19 March 2002) is a South African cricketer. A wicketkeeper-batsman, he plays for Western Province in domestic cricket.

Smith was born in Cape Town and educated there at South African College High School. In February 2021, he was named as the captain of the South Africa national under-19 cricket team. He made his Twenty20 debut on 26 September 2021, for Western Province in the 2021–22 CSA Provincial T20 Knock-Out tournament. He made his first-class debut on 18 November 2021, for Western Province in the 2021–22 CSA 4-Day Series. He made his List A debut on 16 March 2022, for Western Province in the 2021–22 CSA One-Day Cup.
