= Jiveshan Pillay =

South African cricketer

Personal information
- Born: 18 January 1999 (age 27); Pietermaritzburg, Natal Province, South Africa
- Batting: Left-handed
- Bowling: Right-arm off break
- Role: Batsman

Domestic team information
- Years: Team
- 2017: South Africa U19
- 2017: Northerns
- Source: Cricinfo, 1 September 2017

Jiveshan Pillay (born 18 January 1999) is a South African cricketer. He made his Twenty20 debut for Northerns in the 2017 Africa T20 Cup on 1 September 2017. He made his first-class debut for Northerns in the 2017–18 Sunfoil 3-Day Cup on 12 October 2017. He made his List A debut for Northerns in the 2017–18 CSA Provincial One-Day Challenge on 15 October 2017, scoring a century.

In December 2017, Pillay was named in South Africa's squad for the 2018 Under-19 Cricket World Cup.

Pillay was the leading run-scorer in the 2017–18 CSA Provincial One-Day Challenge tournament for Northerns, with 214 runs in six matches. In July 2018, he was named in the Cricket South Africa Emerging Squad. In September 2018, he was named in Northerns' squad for the 2018 Africa T20 Cup. In April 2021, he was named in Northerns' squad, ahead of the 2021–22 cricket season in South Africa.
