= Salieg Nackerdien =

South African cricketer (born 1963)

Personal information
- Full name: Mugammad Salieg Nackerdien
- Born: 19 July 1963; Paarl, Cape Province, South Africa
- Batting: Left-handed
- Bowling: Right-arm medium
- Role: Batsman

Career statistics
Competition	First-class	List A
Matches	52	14
Runs scored	2,288	264
Batting average	25.14	20.30
100s/50s	3/12	0/0
Top score	122	47
Balls bowled	912	–
Wickets	11	–
Bowling average	44.09	–
5 wickets in innings	0	–
10 wickets in match	0	–
Best bowling	2/20	–
Catches/stumpings	24/–	10/–
- Source: ESPNcricinfo

Mugammad Salieg Nackerdien (born 19 July 1963) is a South African cricketer from Paarl. He was a left-handed batsman, and bowled Right Arm Medium. He represented Boland in First-class and List-A cricket He made his First-class debut in 1983/84 and almost three years later he played List-A also for Boland.

He retired from all forms of cricket in 1996.
